= 2026–27 Northern Counties East Football League =

Northern Counties East Football League
- Season: 2026–27

The 2026–27 Northern Counties East Football League season is the 45th in the history of the Northern Counties East Football League, a football competition in England.

The allocations for Steps 5 and 6 this season were announced by The Football Association on 14 May 2025.

== Premier Division ==
Northern Counties East League Premier Division
- Top goalscorer: Jamie Austin; Dearne & District (18 goals)
- Biggest home win: Bottesford Town 10–0 Keighley Town (28 July 2026)
- Biggest away win: Keighley Town 1–7 Albion Sports (5 September 2026)
- Highest scoring: Bottesford Town 10–0 Keighley Town (28 July 2026)
- Longest winning run: Campion; Knaresborough Town (3 games each)
- Longest unbeaten run: Campion (7 games)
- Longest winless run: Keighley Town (17 games)
- Longest losing run: Keighley Town (6 games)
- Highest attendance: 689 (Retford United 2–2 Retford, 5 September 2026)
- Lowest attendance: 61 (Albion Sports 2–1 Worsbrough Bridge Athletic, 31 October 2026)
- Average attendance: 189
- All statistics correct as of 9 November 2026.

The Premier Division consists of 20 clubs.

The following four teams left the division at the end of the 2025–26 season:

- Beverley Town - promoted to Northern Premier League Division One East
- Liversedge - promoted to Northern Premier League Division One East
- Sheffield - transferred to United Counties League Premier Division North
- Wombwell Town - relegated to NCEL Division One

The following four teams joined the division ahead of the 2026–27 season:

- Dearne & District - promoted from NCEL Division One
- Retford - promoted from UCL Division One
- Retford United - promoted from UCL Division One
- Worsbrough Bridge Athletic - promoted from NCEL Division One

Renaming: Eccleshill United was renamed Keighley Town

=== Premier Division table ===
| Pos | Team | Pld | W | D | L | GF | GA | GD | Pts | Promotion, qualification or relegation |
|---|---|---|---|---|---|---|---|---|---|---|
| 1 | Dearne & District | 22 | 15 | 2 | 5 | 52 | 26 | +26 | 47 | Promotion to the Northern Premier League Division One East |
| 2 | Barton Town | 18 | 12 | 3 | 3 | 34 | 12 | +22 | 39 | Qualification for the play-offs |
| 3 | Retford | 19 | 11 | 4 | 4 | 37 | 24 | +13 | 37 | Qualification for the play-offs |
| 4 | Campion | 21 | 11 | 3 | 7 | 40 | 33 | +7 | 36 | Qualification for the play-offs |
| 5 | Retford United | 21 | 9 | 8 | 4 | 47 | 24 | +23 | 35 | Qualification for the play-offs |
| 6 | Bottesford Town | 18 | 10 | 4 | 4 | 43 | 18 | +25 | 34 | |
| 7 | Horbury Town | 21 | 9 | 5 | 7 | 33 | 23 | +10 | 32 | |
| 8 | Knaresborough Town | 19 | 9 | 4 | 6 | 41 | 32 | +9 | 31 | |
| 9 | Handsworth | 20 | 8 | 5 | 7 | 34 | 37 | −3 | 29 | |
| 10 | Penistone Church | 21 | 8 | 4 | 9 | 35 | 36 | −1 | 28 | |
| 11 | Thackley | 21 | 7 | 6 | 8 | 34 | 34 | 0 | 27 | |
| 12 | Albion Sports | 21 | 8 | 3 | 10 | 34 | 37 | −3 | 27 | |
| 13 | Rossington Main | 18 | 6 | 7 | 5 | 30 | 25 | +5 | 25 | |
| 14 | Golcar United | 19 | 7 | 4 | 8 | 36 | 38 | −2 | 25 | |
| 15 | Frickley Athletic | 20 | 6 | 4 | 10 | 32 | 31 | +1 | 22 | |
| 16 | Pickering Town | 20 | 6 | 4 | 10 | 28 | 40 | −12 | 22 | |
| 17 | Worsbrough Bridge Athletic | 19 | 6 | 2 | 11 | 30 | 36 | −6 | 20 | |
| 18 | Parkgate | 21 | 4 | 6 | 11 | 21 | 44 | −23 | 18 | |
| 19 | Tadcaster Albion | 20 | 3 | 8 | 9 | 18 | 37 | −19 | 17 | Relegation to Division One |
| 20 | Keighley Town | 19 | 0 | 2 | 17 | 11 | 83 | −72 | 2 | Relegation to Division One |

Updated to match(es) played on 21 November 2026. Source: Northern Counties East League
Rules for classification: 1) points; 2) goal difference; 3) number of goals scored; 4) number of matches won; 5) head-to-head results

=== Stadia and locations ===
Location of the clubs in the 2026–27 NCEL Premier Division on a map of Yorkshire and the Humber

| Club | Stadium | Capacity |
|---|---|---|
| Albion Sports | Myra Shay | |
| Barton Town | Euronics Ground | 3,000 |
| Bottesford Town | Birch Park | 1,000 |
| Campion | Scotchman Road | |
| Dearne & District | Welfare Ground, Goldthorpe | |
| Frickley Athletic | Westfield Lane | 2,087 |
| Golcar United | Longfield Avenue | 1,200 |
| Handsworth | Oliver's Mount | 2,500 |
| Horbury Town | Slazengers Sports Complex | 800 |
| Keighley Town | Cougar Park | 2,225 |
| Knaresborough Town | Manse Lane | 1,000 |
| Parkgate | Roundwood Sports Complex | 1,000 |
| Penistone Church | Church View Road | 1,000 |
| Pickering Town | Mill Lane | 2,000 |
| Retford | | |
| Retford United | Cannon Park | |
| Rossington Main | Welfare Ground | 2,000 |
| Tadcaster Albion | Ings Lane | 2,000 |
| Thackley | Dennyfield | 3,000 |
| Worsbrough Bridge Athletic | Park Road | 2,000 |

== Division One ==
Northern Counties East League Division One
- Top goalscorer: Joshua Batty (Brigg Town) (15 goals)
- Biggest home win: Route One Rovers 9–0 Appleby Frodingham (8 August 2026)
- Biggest away win: Kinsley Boys 0–8 Brigg Town (17 October 2026)
- Highest scoring: Wakefield 7–4 South Leeds (30 October 2026)
- Longest winning run: LIV (3 games)
- Longest unbeaten run: Brigg Town (16 games)
- Longest winless run: Immingham Town (16 games)
- Longest losing run: 4 teams (2 games)
- Highest attendance: 524 (Harrogate Railway Athletic 4–1 South Leeds, 25 July 2026)
- Lowest attendance: 37 (LIV 4–1 Route One Rovers, 19 September 2026)
- Average attendance: 158
- All statistics correct as of 9 November 2026.

Division One consists of 22 clubs.

The following six clubs left Division One before the season:

- Dearne & District - promoted to Northern Counties East League Premier Division
- Glasshoughton Welfare - relegated to Regional Feeder Leagues
- Louth Town - transferred to United Counties League Division One
- Maltby Main - transferred to United Counties League Division One
- Nostell Miners Welfare - relegated to Regional Feeder Leagues
- Worsbrough Bridge Athletic - promoted to Northern Counties East League Premier Division

The following six clubs joined Division One before the season:

- Field Olympic - promoted from West Yorkshire Association League Premier Division
- Hemsworth Miners Welfare - promoted from Sheffield & Hallamshire County Senior League Premier Division
- Immingham Town - promoted from Lincolnshire League
- Kinsley Boys - promoted from Central Midlands League Premier Division North
- LIV - promoted from Humber Premier League Premier Division
- Wombwell Town - relegated from NCEL Premier Division

=== League table ===
| Pos | Team | Pld | W | D | L | GF | GA | GD | Pts | Promotion, qualification or relegation |
|---|---|---|---|---|---|---|---|---|---|---|
| 1 | Field Olympic | 21 | 15 | 3 | 3 | 63 | 21 | +42 | 48 | Promotion to the Premier Division |
| 2 | Brigg Town | 20 | 15 | 3 | 2 | 53 | 14 | +39 | 48 | Qualification for the play-offs |
| 3 | Wombwell Town | 21 | 14 | 4 | 3 | 50 | 23 | +27 | 46 | Qualification for the play-offs |
| 4 | Armthorpe Welfare | 20 | 12 | 4 | 4 | 42 | 24 | +18 | 40 | Qualification for the play-offs |
| 5 | Route One Rovers | 21 | 11 | 2 | 8 | 46 | 36 | +10 | 35 | Qualification for the play-offs |
| 6 | Club Thorne Colliery | 21 | 9 | 5 | 7 | 49 | 39 | +10 | 32 | |
| 7 | Goole | 21 | 10 | 2 | 9 | 41 | 34 | +7 | 32 | |
| 8 | Wakefield | 22 | 10 | 2 | 10 | 32 | 34 | −2 | 32 | |
| 9 | Crowle Colts | 21 | 9 | 5 | 7 | 38 | 41 | −3 | 32 | |
| 10 | Selby Town | 20 | 8 | 7 | 5 | 29 | 22 | +7 | 31 | |
| 11 | LIV | 21 | 8 | 6 | 7 | 45 | 39 | +6 | 30 | |
| 12 | Kinsley Boys | 21 | 9 | 3 | 9 | 35 | 50 | −15 | 30 | |
| 13 | Winterton Rangers | 21 | 8 | 3 | 10 | 37 | 38 | −1 | 27 | |
| 14 | Harrogate Railway Athletic | 21 | 8 | 3 | 10 | 34 | 42 | −8 | 27 | |
| 15 | Appleby Frodingham | 20 | 7 | 4 | 9 | 28 | 41 | −13 | 25 | |
| 16 | Athersley Recreation | 21 | 5 | 7 | 9 | 24 | 46 | −22 | 22 | |
| 17 | Leeds UFCA | 20 | 5 | 5 | 10 | 34 | 37 | −3 | 20 | |
| 18 | Ilkley Town | 20 | 4 | 6 | 10 | 35 | 42 | −7 | 18 | |
| 19 | Hemsworth Miners Welfare | 20 | 3 | 4 | 13 | 23 | 46 | −23 | 13 | |
| 20 | South Leeds | 21 | 2 | 5 | 14 | 26 | 61 | −35 | 11 | Possible relegation to feeder leagues |
| 21 | Immingham Town | 20 | 2 | 3 | 15 | 20 | 54 | −34 | 9 | Possible relegation to feeder leagues |
| 22 | Doncaster City | 0 | 0 | 0 | 0 | 0 | 0 | 0 | 0 | Resigned mid-season (record expunged) (Note: On 15 September 2026, Doncaster City announced their resignation from the league, and their record of Pld10 W5 D2 L3 GF19 GA16 was expunged.) |

Updated to match(es) played on 21 November 2026. Source: Northern Counties East Football League
Rules for classification: 1) points; 2) goal difference; 3) number of goals scored; 4) number of matches won; 5) head-to-head results

=== Stadia and locations ===
Location of the clubs in the 2026–27 NCEL Division One on a map of Yorkshire and the Humber

| Club | Location | Stadium | Capacity |
|---|---|---|---|
| Appleby Frodingham | Scunthorpe | Brumby Hall Sports Ground | 1,100 |
| Armthorpe Welfare | Armthorpe | Welfare Ground | 2,500 |
| Athersley Recreation | Athersley | Sheerien Park | 2,000 |
| Brigg Town | Brigg | The Hawthorns | 2,500 |
| Club Thorne Colliery | Moorends | Chesterfield Poultry Stadium | 1,200 |
| Crowle Colts | Crowle | Windsor Park | |
| Doncaster City | Armthorpe | Welfare Ground (groundshare with Armthorpe Welfare) | 2,500 |
| Field Olympic | Bradford | Olympic Park | |
| Goole | Goole | Victoria Pleasure Grounds | 3,000 |
| Harrogate Railway Athletic | Harrogate | Station View | 3,500 |
| Hemsworth Miners Welfare | Fitzwilliam | Just Football MDC Sports Stadium | |
| Ilkley Town | Ilkley | The MPM Stadium | 700 |
| Immingham Town | Immingham | Woodlands Sports Ground | |
| Kinsley Boys | Kinsley | Kinsley Timber Stadium | |
| Leeds UCFA | Crofton | The Welfare Stadium | |
| LIV | Kingston upon Hull | Haworth Park (groundshare with Hull United A.F.C.) | |
| Route One Rovers | Bradford | Myra Shay | |
| Selby Town | Selby | Richard Street | 5,000 |
| South Leeds | Leeds | South Leeds Stadium | 3,450 |
| Wakefield | Pontefract | The Hunters Stadium | |
| Winterton Rangers | Winterton | The MKM Stadium | 3,000 |
| Wombwell Town | Wombwell | Recreation Ground | |

== League Cup ==
2026–27 Northern Counties East Football League League Cup
Tournament details
- Country: England
- Teams: 42

The 2026–27 Northern Counties East Football League League Cup is the 44th season of the league cup competition of the Northern Counties East Football League.
