= List of Northern Counties East Football League clubs =

The following is a list of clubs who have played in the Northern Counties East Football League since its formation in 1982 to the current season.

== Current clubs ==
=== Premier Division ===
- Albion Sports
- Barton Town
- Bottesford Town
- Campion
- Dearne & District
- Frickley Athletic
- Golcar United
- Handsworth
- Horbury Town
- Keighley Town
- Knaresborough Town
- Parkgate
- Penistone Church
- Pickering Town
- Retford
- Retford United
- Rossington Main
- Tadcaster Albion
- Thackley
- Worsbrough Bridge Athletic

=== Division One ===
- Appleby Frodingham
- Armthorpe Welfare
- Athersley Recreation
- Brigg Town
- Club Thorne Colliery
- Crowle Colts
- Doncaster City
- Field Olympic
- Goole
- Harrogate Railway Athletic
- Hemsworth Miners Welfare
- Ilkley Town
- Immingham Town
- Kinsley Boys
- Leeds UFCA
- LIV
- Route One Rovers
- Selby Town
- South Leeds
- Wakefield
- Winterton Rangers
- Wombwell Town

== Former clubs ==
- AFC Mansfield
- Alfreton Town
- Appleby Frodingham
- Arnold
- Arnold Kingswell
- Arnold Town
- Askern
- Basford United
- Belper Town
- Bentley Victoria Welfare
- Beverley Town
- Blidworth Welfare
- Borrowash Victoria
- Boston Town
- Bradley Rangers
- Bridlington Town
- Bridlington Trinity
- Brighouse Town
- Brodsworth Welfare
- Brook Sports
- Buxton
- Carlton Town
- Clay Cross Town
- Cleethorpes Town
- Clipstone
- Collingham
- Creswell Colliery
- Curzon Ashton
- Denaby United
- Dinnington Town
- Eastwood Town
- Emley (1903)
- Emley
- FC Bolsover
- FC Humber United
- Frecheville Community Association
- Fryston Colliery Welfare
- Garforth Town
- Gedling Town
- Glapwell
- Glasshoughton Welfare
- Goole Town
- Graham Street Prims
- Grimethorpe Miners Welfare
- Grimsby Borough
- Guisborough Town
- Guiseley
- Hall Road Rangers
- Hallam
- Handsworth (2003)
- Harrogate Town
- Harworth Colliery
- Hatfield Main
- Heanor Town
- Hemsworth Miners Welfare
- Hucknall Rolls Royce
- Hucknall Town
- Hull United
- Ilkeston Town
- Immingham Town
- Kimberley Town
- Kiveton Park
- Leeds Ashley Road
- Leeds Carnegie
- Lincoln Moorlands Railway
- Lincoln United
- Liversedge
- Long Eaton Grange
- Long Eaton United
- Louth Town
- Louth United
- Maltby Main
- Mexborough Town
- Mickleover Sports
- North Ferriby
- North Ferriby United
- North Shields
- Norton Woodseats
- Nostell Miners Welfare
- Oakham United
- Ollerton Town
- Ossett Albion
- Ossett Town
- Phoenix Park
- Pilkington Recreation
- Pontefract Collieries
- Rainworth Miners Welfare
- Retford
- Retford Rail
- Retford Town
- Retford United
- Rowntree Mackintosh
- Scarborough Athletic
- Shaw Lane Aquaforce
- Sheffield
- Shepshed Charterhouse
- Sherwood Colliery
- Shirebrook Town
- Silsden
- Skegness Town
- South Normanton Athletic
- Spalding United
- Spennymoor United
- Staveley Miners Welfare
- Staveley Works
- Stocksbridge Park Steels
- Stocksbridge Works
- Swallownest
- Sutton Town
- Sutton Trinity
- Teversal
- Thorne Colliery
- Westella & Willerby
- Winterton Rangers
- Wombwell Sports Association
- Woolley Miners Welfare
- Worksop Town
- York Railway Institute
- Yorkshire Amateur
- Yorkshire Main
