= Zephaniah Thomas =

English footballer

Personal information
- Full name: Zephaniah Joseph Thomas
- Date of birth: 14 November 1989 (age 36)
- Place of birth: Bradford, England
- Height: 1.78 m (5 ft 10 in)
- Positions: Forward; midfielder

Team information
- Current team: Dearne & District

Youth career
- –2008: Rotherham United

Senior career*
Years	Team	Apps	(Gls)
2008	Ilkeston Town		
2009	Emley		
2009–2010	Harrogate Town		
2009	→ Harrogate Railway Athletic (loan)		
2010	Garden City Broncbusters		
2010	Parkgate		
2010–2011	Rossington Main	20	(10)
2011	Stocksbridge Park Steels		
2011–2012	Rossington Main		
2012	Montegnée	10	(1)
2012–2013	Cowdenbeath	5	(0)
2013	Thunder Bay Chill	12	(1)
2013–2014	Sheffield	24	(19)
2014	Mickleover Sports	7	(5)
2014	Scarborough Athletic	0	(0)
2014	Matlock Town		
2014	Goole		
2014–2015	Boston United	7	(0)
2014–2015	→ Sheffield (dual registration)	12	(6)
2015	Frickley Athletic	16	(10)
2015–2016	Mickleover Sports	10	(5)
2016	Rossington Main	2	(1)
2016–2017	Mickleover Sports	7	(5)
2017	Shaw Lane		
2017	Stafford Rangers		
2017	Frickley Athletic		
2017	Mickleover Sports	8	(1)
2017–2018	Glossop North End	15	(5)
2018	Campion	2	(0)
2018	Eccleshill United	7	(1)
2018	Leek Town	3	(1)
2018–2019	Brighouse Town	24	(5)
2019	Belper Town		
2019–2020	Rossington Main	16	(3)
2020	Frickley Athletic		
2020	Selby Town		
2020–2023	Brighouse Town		
2023–2024	Ossett United	0	
2024–	Dearne & District		

International career^{‡}
2012–2017	Saint Kitts and Nevis	20	(2)
- * Club domestic league appearances and goals as of 19:38, 25 March 2018 (UTC) ‡ National team caps and goals as of 22:39, 7 October 2016 (UTC)

Zephaniah Joseph Thomas (born 14 November 1989) is a footballer and manager of Dearne & District and former Saint Kitts and Nevis international.

He is a former Rotherham United youth player who has also played non-League football with many clubs including Harrogate Town and Rossington Main, while also having an intermediate spell in the United States. Before he turned professional joining Belgian club Montegnée followed by a spell in Scottish First Division with Cowdenbeath. He then moved to North America for a second time playing for Canadian side Thunder Bay Chill before returning to English football.

== Club career ==
=== Early career ===
Thomas who was born in Bradford started his career as a youth player at Rotherham United but left the club in 2008 having not appeared for the senior team. Following his release he joined Northern Premier League Premier Division side Ilkeston Town. After spending a few months with them he moved on to Emley before joining Harrogate Town. While at the Conference North side he was loaned out to local club Harrogate Railway Athletic. He then moved to the United States with fellow Englishman Jason Stokes to study at Garden City Community College while playing for their soccer team. However things didn't work out and he returned to England. Thomas then played for Parkgate before leaving them to join Rossington Main in November 2010. At the start 2011–12 season he joined Stocksbridge Park Steels for a short period before rejoining Rossington Main who he went on to make twenty appearances for, scoring ten goals. In December 2012, he signed a full-time professional contract with Belgian side Montegnée having been spotted by scout Simon O'Neill. He played his last game for Northern Counties East Football League side Rossington on 2 January 2012 against Appleby Frodingham before moving to Belgium. After six months with the Belgian Promotion D team, Thomas returned to England and was again looking for a new club while playing Sunday league football with Swinton WMC.

=== Cowdenbeath ===
On 22 August 2012, Thomas joined Scottish First Division side Cowdenbeath. He signed a one-year contract with the recently promoted side following a trial. He made his first appearance for the club just three days later at home to Hamilton Academical, coming off the bench as a substitute. After just a month with the club having made just three substitute appearances, he was selected by the Saint Kitts and Nevis national football team. His only start came against league leaders Partick Thistle at Firhill Stadium, with Cowdenbeath suffering a 2–1 defeat. Cowdenbeath boss Colin Cameron placed Thomas on the transfer list in early January 2013 and only a matter of days later he was released by club. After leaving Cowdenbeath, Thomas started working in a call centre.

=== Thunder Bay Chill ===
In March 2013, it was announced Thomas had agreed to join Canadian side Thunder Bay Chill. Thomas linked up with his new club in May 2013 but was ruled out of pre-season due to a groin injury. He also missed the opening games of the season against WSA Winnipeg. On 1 June, he made his début for Thunder Bay in 2–0 victory over Des Moines Menace at Fort William Stadium. In the next match versus St. Louis Lions which Thunder Bay won 3–0, Thomas provided an assist for teammate Sunny Omoregie to score. He set up a further two goals for his colleagues against Springfield Demize and Kansas City Brass. Thomas got his only goal for Thunder Bay in the penultimate game of the regular season.

=== Sheffield ===
Thomas returned to England following the expiration of his contract with Thunder Bay Chill and trained with Tranmere Rovers. His international clearance was delayed and therefore missed out on the chance to play for their reserve side. Ian Whitehorne, manager of Sheffield who play in the Northern Premier League Division One South, invited him for a trial. Thomas scored in his trial match and ultimately signed for the club at the beginning of September 2013.

=== Boston United ===
In October 2014, Thomas was offered a trial with Boston United having scored twice for his national side in September. In the trial he played for the Pilgrims' under-21 side against Horncastle Town, scoring a hat-trick. He joined the Conference North side on non-contract terms days later.

=== 2016 onwards ===
In October 2016 he re-signed for Rossington Main from Mickleover Sports, having been with the latter since 2015. He scored on his third debut, against Grimsby Borough in the Northern Counties East Football League on 15 October 2016, but the spell with The Colliery was short-lived as he returned to Mickleover Sports in time for the FA Trophy game at Leamington on 29 October 2016. He transferred to Shaw Lane in February 2017, Stafford Rangers in March 2017 and Frickley Athletic later that same month. On 18 August 2017, he was brought back to Mickleover Sports once again. He made his debut for fellow Derbyshire club Glossop North End on 28 October 2017. In February 2018 he signed for Campion of 10th tier Northern Counties East League Division One, before relocating to Bradford neighbours and league rivals Eccleshill United shortly after. He made his debut at home against AFC Emley on 21 March 2018.

Prior to the 2018–19 Northern Premier League Division One West season, Leek Town announced his signature. He come off the bench in the 71st minute as Leek Town won the season opener at Skelmersdale United on 18 August 2018.

On 29 September 2018 he made another debut, for Brighouse Town of the Division One East, away at Glossop North End. He spent the remainder of the season with Town, before moving south to Belper Town of the – after a division restructuring – neighbouring Division One South East in June 2019. Later that year, he returned to Rossington Main. He joined Frickley Athletic for the third time in February 2020. Later on in the year he joined North Yorkshire side Selby Town. In December 2020, he returned to former club Brighouse Town.

In July 2023, Thomas signed for Ossett United who joined the club in the role of player-coach.

In August 2024, Thomas joined Dearne & District as part-time First Team player-manager. Thomas' spell at Dearne & District has been relatively long, given that as of August 2026 Thomas has made 39 club transfers over 18 years, spanning five countries. He combines this role with that as lead coach for Derby County under-12s team.

== International career ==
"I've gone from playing for Rossington Main to playing for Swinton WMC on Sundays then to Belgium then this pre-season struggling for a club but thankfully Cowdenbeath FC showed faith in me and now I am going on international duty respect everyone for the nice comments."

— Thomas speaking after receiving an international call-up.

Thomas got in touch with the St. Kitts and Nevis Football Association to make them aware of his eligibility through contact Des Hazel, a former St. Kitts international. The FA reviewed some footage of Thomas and in September 2012, Thomas received an international call-up from Saint Kitts and Nevis to represent them in the Caribbean Cup. Despite having been born in England, he was eligible for Saint Kitts and Nevis due to his grandfather. He made his international début in a 2–0 victory over Anguilla. He started again in the following match against group favourites Trinidad and Tobago with the match ending in a 1–0 defeat.

== Career statistics ==
=== International ===
Saint Kitts and Nevis goal tally first.

International appearances and goals
#	Date	Venue	Opponent	Goals	Result	Competition
2012
1	11 October	Warner Park Sporting Complex, Basseterre, Saint Kitts and Nevis	Anguilla		2–0	2012 Caribbean Cup qualification
2	13 October	Warner Park Sporting Complex, Basseterre, Saint Kitts and Nevis	Trinidad and Tobago		0–1	2012 Caribbean Cup qualification
2014
3	3 September	Warner Park Sporting Complex, Basseterre, Saint Kitts and Nevis	Saint Lucia		0–0	2014 Caribbean Cup qualification
4	5 September	Warner Park Sporting Complex, Basseterre, Saint Kitts and Nevis	Dominica	4–0	5–0	2014 Caribbean Cup qualification
5	7 September	Warner Park Sporting Complex, Basseterre, Saint Kitts and Nevis	Guyana	1–0	2–0	2014 Caribbean Cup qualification
6	8 October	Stade Sylvio Cator, Port-au-Prince, Haiti	Barbados		2–3	2014 Caribbean Cup qualification
7	10 October	Stade Sylvio Cator, Port-au-Prince, Haiti	French Guiana		2–1	2014 Caribbean Cup qualification
8	12 October	Stade Sylvio Cator, Port-au-Prince, Haiti	Haiti		0–0	2014 Caribbean Cup qualification
2015
9	23 March	Warner Park Sporting Complex, Basseterre, Saint Kitts and Nevis	Turks and Caicos Islands		6–2	2018 World Cup qualification
10	26 March	TCIFA National Academy, Providenciales, Turks and Caicos Islands	Turks and Caicos Islands		6–2	2018 World Cup qualification
11	11 June	Warner Park Sporting Complex, Basseterre, Saint Kitts and Nevis	El Salvador		2–2	2018 World Cup qualification
12	16 June	Estadio Cuscatlán, San Salvador, El Salvador	El Salvador		1–4	2018 World Cup qualification
13	12 November	Estadi Comunal, Andorra la Vella, Andorra	Andorra		1–0	Friendly
14	17 November	A. Le Coq Arena, Tallinn, Estonia	Estonia		0–3	Friendly
2016
15	29 March	Warner Park Sporting Complex, Basseterre, Saint Kitts and Nevis	Antigua and Barbuda		1–0	2017 Caribbean Cup qualification
16	1 June	Warner Park Sporting Complex, Basseterre, Saint Kitts and Nevis	Suriname		1–0	2017 Caribbean Cup qualification
17	7 June	Arnos Vale Stadium, Kingstown, Saint Vincent and the Grenadines	Saint Vincent and the Grenadines		1–0	2017 Caribbean Cup qualification
