= 2025–26 Northern Counties East Football League =

Northern Counties East Football League
- Season: 2025–26

The 2025–26 Northern Counties East Football League season is the 44th in the history of the Northern Counties East Football League, a football competition in England.

The allocations for Steps 5 and 6 this season were announced by The Football Association on 15 May 2025.

== Premier Division ==
Northern Counties East League Premier Division
- Champions: Liversedge
- Promoted: Liversedge
- Relegated: Albion Sports; Wombwell Town
- Matches: 380
- Goals: 1,256 (3.31 per match)
- Top goalscorer: (Ivory Coast) Souleymane Coulibaly (Pickering Town) (31 goals)
- Biggest home win: Sheffield F.C. 10–2 Albion Sports (20 December 2025)
- Biggest away win: Thackley 0–7 Frickley Athletic (6 December 2025); Thackley 0–7 Handsworth (21 March 2026)
- Highest scoring: Sheffield 10–2 Albion Sports (20 December 2025)
- Longest winning run: Tadcaster Albion (6 games)
- Longest unbeaten run: Liversedge (12 games)
- Longest losing run: Wombwell Town (8 games)
- Highest attendance: 1172 (Sheffield 0–4 Tadcaster Albion, 28 March 2026)
- Lowest attendance: 36 (Eccleshill United 3–1 Penistone Church, 29 November 2025)
- Average attendance: 210

The Premier Division consists of 21 clubs.

The following four teams left the division at the end of the 2024–25 season:

- Goole - relegated to NCEL Division One
- Hallam - promoted to Northern Premier League Division One East
- Silsden - promoted to Northern Premier League Division One East
- Winterton Rangers - relegated to NCEL Division One

The following five teams joined the division ahead of the 2025–26 season:

- Farsley Celtic - relegated from National League North
- Horbury Town - promoted from NCEL Division One
- Liversedge - relegated from Northern Premier League Division One East
- Sheffield - relegated from Northern Premier League Division One East
- Wombwell Town - promoted from NCEL Division One

=== League table ===
Pos	Team	Pld	W	D	L	GF	GA	GD	Pts	Promotion, qualification or relegation
1	Liversedge (C, P)	38	27	8	3	85	29	+56	89	Promoted to the Northern Premier League Division One East
2	Beverley Town (O, P)	38	23	6	9	78	47	+31	75	Qualified for the play-offs
3	Sheffield	38	21	9	8	88	43	+45	72	Qualified for the play-offs, then transferred to the United Counties League Premier Division North
4	Tadcaster Albion	38	21	8	9	72	46	+26	71	Qualified for the play-offs
5	Barton Town	38	21	7	10	70	44	+26	70	Qualified for the play-offs
6	Campion	38	18	11	9	80	52	+28	65	
7	Handsworth	38	20	4	14	68	58	+10	64	
8	Pickering Town	38	17	7	14	66	61	+5	58	
9	Knaresborough Town	38	13	12	13	70	59	+11	51	
10	Golcar United	38	13	11	14	73	59	+14	50	
11	Parkgate	38	11	14	13	57	75	−18	47	
12	Eccleshill United	38	12	7	19	40	61	−21	43	
13	Penistone Church	38	10	13	15	53	77	−24	43	
14	Rossington Main	38	11	9	18	60	64	−4	42	
15	Frickley Athletic	38	12	6	20	45	75	−30	42	
16	Horbury Town	38	9	12	17	57	61	−4	39	
17	Bottesford Town	38	11	6	21	56	81	−25	39	
18	Thackley	38	10	9	19	40	71	−31	39	
19	Albion Sports	38	11	5	22	67	100	−33	38	Reprieved from relegation
20	Wombwell Town (R)	38	3	8	27	31	93	−62	17	Relegated to Division One
21	Farsley Celtic	0	0	0	0	0	0	0	0	Resigned from the league and folded (Note: On 30 June 2025, Farsley Celtic resigned from the NECL, prior to the season's start.)

Source: Northern Counties East Football League
Rules for classification: 1) points; 2) goal difference; 3) number of goals scored; 4) number of matches won; 5) head-to-head results
(C) Champions; (O) Play-off winners; (P) Promoted; (R) Relegated

=== Results table ===
Home \ Away	ALB	BAR	BEV	BOT	CAM	ECC	FRI	GCR	HAN	HOR	KNA	LIV	PAR	PEC	PIC	ROM	SHE	TAD	THA	WOM
Albion Sports	—	3–4	1–4	0–3	2–1	1–4	1–4	3–4	2–5	2–3	0–2	1–6	4–2	3–3	3–2	5–5	2–2	4–2	3–0	2–1
Barton Town	3–1	—	0–1	2–0	1–2	3–1	1–0	3–0	1–2	0–4	1–1	0–0	4–1	3–2	0–3	1–1	4–0	0–0	2–0	3–1
Beverley Town	5–1	1–0	—	2–0	2–1	3–1	1–4	3–2	1–3	1–0	3–1	0–2	1–1	2–3	1–0	2–0	2–2	2–2	5–1	6–1
Bottesford Town	1–4	1–3	2–0	—	0–3	0–1	1–0	2–2	1–2	1–0	2–6	0–3	6–3	3–3	5–1	0–4	0–1	1–3	2–2	2–0
Campion	2–0	1–3	0–5	1–1	—	4–1	4–0	0–0	2–2	3–2	2–1	0–0	1–1	3–3	1–1	2–2	2–1	1–3	3–0	5–0
Eccleshill United	1–0	2–2	0–1	0–1	0–1	—	1–0	1–0	3–0	2–1	2–1	1–1	0–2	3–1	2–3	2–1	0–3	1–2	0–2	2–2
Frickley Athletic	2–1	0–1	1–3	2–1	0–4	3–1	—	1–6	0–3	1–1	0–3	0–0	0–2	2–3	1–1	4–1	1–3	0–3	1–0	2–0
Golcar United	3–0	0–3	1–1	4–1	1–2	4–0	6–0	—	0–1	2–1	2–2	1–2	4–0	2–0	2–0	3–0	0–4	1–1	0–0	3–1
Handsworth	2–1	0–2	0–4	2–0	1–7	2–0	1–2	2–1	—	3–1	4–0	2–1	1–1	4–0	1–4	3–1	0–1	3–1	1–2	3–2
Horbury Town	2–0	2–2	2–3	2–3	0–1	4–0	0–0	1–1	0–0	—	3–1	3–4	0–0	2–4	1–2	0–2	1–0	3–1	4–2	2–1
Knaresborough Town	2–1	0–1	0–2	2–2	3–1	2–1	6–0	4–1	2–0	0–0	—	2–1	1–1	4–2	1–1	1–2	1–1	0–2	1–3	1–1
Liversedge	3–0	2–1	2–0	4–3	4–1	2–0	2–0	1–1	2–1	2–0	3–1	—	5–0	4–1	2–0	2–1	2–2	3–0	1–1	4–0
Parkgate	2–2	2–1	0–0	1–1	1–1	0–0	2–2	5–4	2–0	1–1	4–3	0–3	—	6–1	1–1	2–5	0–6	0–3	1–1	3–0
Penistone Church	0–3	0–2	1–1	2–0	1–3	0–0	0–2	2–2	1–0	2–2	3–3	0–1	3–2	—	0–2	1–1	1–0	2–1	1–0	1–1
Pickering Town	0–3	2–1	2–0	3–0	0–4	2–0	2–0	3–2	4–1	4–4	3–3	1–3	1–2	1–1	—	3–1	2–0	0–3	2–3	2–1
Rossington Main	0–1	1–3	1–3	1–2	1–1	0–0	4–0	1–1	0–1	2–1	2–2	3–4	1–2	4–2	2–1	—	1–0	0–1	0–1	3–0
Sheffield	10–2	4–2	6–0	4–1	2–2	2–0	5–0	3–1	1–1	3–2	0–0	1–1	3–2	3–0	3–2	2–1	—	0–4	2–1	7–1
Tadcaster Albion	2–2	1–3	3–2	2–1	1–6	2–3	1–1	2–0	4–2	3–0	2–1	0–1	3–0	1–1	3–0	2–0	1–0	—	1–1	3–0
Thackley	3–1	1–1	0–1	2–4	4–1	3–3	0–7	2–5	0–7	0–0	0–3	1–0	0–1	0–1	0–1	1–3	0–1	0–0	—	1–0
Wombwell Town	0–2	1–3	0–4	4–2	2–1	0–1	0–2	1–1	1–2	2–2	0–3	0–2	2–1	1–1	0–4	2–2	0–0	1–3	1–2	—

Source: Northern Counties East Football League
Legend: Blue = home team win; Yellow = draw; Red = away team win.
For upcoming matches, an "a" indicates there is an article about the rivalry between the two participants.

=== Play-offs ===
Semi-finals
2	Beverley Town	1
5	Barton Town	0
3	Sheffield	2(3)
4	Tadcaster Albion	2(4)

Final
2	Beverley Town	2
4	Tadcaster Albion	1

==== Semifinals ====
11 April	Beverley Town	1–0	Barton Town	Beverley
15:00	Snelgrove 71' (pen.)			Stadium: Norwood Park; Attendance: 999

11 April	Sheffield	2–2 (a.e.t.) (3–4 p)	Tadcaster Albion	Dronfield
15:00	Hardwick 19'; Greenhouse 34'		Cassama 78', 90'	Stadium: Home of Football Stadium; Attendance: 902

==== Final ====
18 April	Beverley Town	2–1	Tadcaster Albion	Beverley
15:00	Sani 60'; Šuluburić 82'		Kiwomya 88'	Stadium: Norwood Park; Attendance: 999

=== Stadia and locations ===
Location of the clubs in the 2025–26 NCEL Premier Division on a map of Yorkshire and the Humber

Club	Stadium	Location	Capacity
Albion Sports	Myra Shay	Bradford	500
Barton Town	Euronics Ground	Barton on Humber	3,000
Beverley Town	Norwood Recreation Ground	Beverley	1,500
Bottesford Town	Birch Park	Scunthorpe	1,000
Campion	Scotchman Road	Bradford	1,000
Eccleshill United	Cougar Park (Note: home of Keighley Cougars (groundshare))	Keighley	2,225
Frickley Athletic	Westfield Lane	South Elmsall	2,087
Golcar United	Longfield Avenue	Huddersfield (Golcar)	1,200
Handsworth	Oliver's Mount	Sheffield (Darnall)	2,500
Horbury Town	Slazengers Sports Complex	Wakefield (Horbury)	800
Knaresborough Town	Manse Lane	Knaresborough	1,000
Liversedge	Clayborn	Liversedge	2,000
Parkgate	Roundwood Sports Complex	Rotherham (Rawmarsh)	1,000
Penistone Church	Church View Road	Penistone	1,000
Pickering Town	Mill Lane	Pickering	2,000
Rossington Main	Welfare Ground	Doncaster (New Rossington)	2,000
Sheffield	Home of Football Ground	Dronfield	2,089
Tadcaster Albion	Ings Lane	Tadcaster	2,000
Thackley	Dennyfield	Bradford	3,000
Wombwell Town	Recreation Ground	Barnsley (Wombwell)	500

== Division One ==
Northern Counties East League Division One
- Champions: Dearne & District
- Promoted: Dearne & District
- Matches: 462
- Goals: 1,708 (3.7 per match)
- Top goalscorer: (England) Zak Khan (Route One Rovers) (52 goals)
- Biggest home win: Harrogate Railway Athletic 10–0 Glasshoughton Welfare (3 March 2026)
- Biggest away win: Glasshoughton Welfare 1–8 Armthorpe Welfare (4 October 2025)
- Highest scoring: Route One Rovers 9–1 Winterton Rangers (15 October 2025); South Leeds 6–4 Louth Town (21 February 2026); Harrogate Railway Athletic 10–0 Glasshoughton Welfare (3 March 2026)
- Longest winning run: Dearne & District (17 games)
- Longest unbeaten run: Dearne & District (18 games)
- Longest losing run: Glasshoughton Welfare (11 games)
- Highest attendance: 565 (Selby Town 1–1 Goole, 16 September 2025)
- Lowest attendance: 23 (Leeds UFCA 2–2 Louth Town, 13 December 2025)
- Average attendance: 149
- All statistics correct as of 11 April 2026.

Division One consists of 22 clubs.

The following six clubs left Division One before the season:

- Dronfield Town - transferred to United Counties League Division One
- Horbury Town - promoted to Northern Counties East League Premier Division
- Shelley - resigned from league to the West Yorkshire Association Football League
- Swallownest - transferred to United Counties League Division One
- Wombwell Town - promoted to Northern Counties East League Premier Division
- Yorkshire Amateur - relegated to Regional Feeder Leagues

The following six clubs joined Division One before the season:

- Crowle Colts - promoted from Lincolnshire League
- Doncaster City - promoted from Central Midlands League Premier Division North
- Goole - relegated from NCEL Premier Division
- Route One Rovers - transferred from North West Counties League Division One North
- Leeds UFCA - promoted from Yorkshire Amateur League Supreme Division
- Winterton Rangers - relegated from NCEL Premier Division

=== League table ===
Pos	Team	Pld	W	D	L	GF	GA	GD	Pts	Promotion, qualification or relegation
1	Dearne & District (C, P)	42	36	2	4	128	32	+96	110	Promoted to the Premier Division
2	Worsbrough Bridge Athletic (O, P)	42	30	5	7	101	48	+53	95	Qualified for the play-offs
3	Wakefield	42	29	6	7	110	41	+69	93	Qualified for the play-offs
4	Harrogate Railway Athletic	42	28	7	7	108	46	+62	91	Qualified for the play-offs
5	Leeds UFCA	42	26	5	11	90	54	+36	83	Qualified for the play-offs
6	Brigg Town	42	24	6	12	89	58	+31	78	
7	Armthorpe Welfare	42	22	7	13	99	76	+23	73	
8	Route One Rovers	42	23	2	17	118	69	+49	71	
9	Club Thorne Colliery	42	20	10	12	73	51	+22	70	
10	Crowle Colts	42	18	5	19	67	75	−8	59	
11	South Leeds	42	16	8	18	79	89	−10	56	
12	Selby Town	42	16	7	19	75	69	+6	55	
13	Goole	42	16	4	22	86	93	−7	52	
14	Maltby Main	42	15	4	23	69	89	−20	49	Transferred to the United Counties League Division One
15	Appleby Frodingham	42	15	2	25	64	103	−39	47	
16	Doncaster City	42	12	9	21	59	88	−29	45	
17	Louth Town	42	12	7	23	59	88	−29	43	Transferred to the United Counties League Division One
18	Ilkley Town	42	10	11	21	59	90	−31	41	
19	Athersley Recreation	42	11	7	24	57	96	−39	40	
20	Winterton Rangers	42	10	4	28	49	93	−44	34	Reprieved from relegation
21	Nostell Miners Welfare (R)	42	7	6	29	35	102	−67	27	Relegated to the Sheffield & Hallamshire County Senior League Premier Division
22	Glasshoughton Welfare (R)	42	2	4	36	34	158	−124	10	Relegated to the West Yorkshire League Premier Division

Source: Northern Counties East Football League
Rules for classification: 1) points; 2) goal difference; 3) number of goals scored; 4) number of matches won; 5) head-to-head results
(C) Champions; (O) Play-off winners; (P) Promoted; (R) Relegated

=== Play-offs ===
Semi-finals
2	Worsbrough Bridge Athletic	3
5	Leeds UFCA	0
3	Wakefield	2 (4)
4	Harrogate Railway Athletic	2 (1)

Final
2	Worsbrough Bridge Athletic	2
3	Wakefield	0

==== Semifinals ====
18 April 2026	Worsbrough Bridge Athletic	3–0	Leeds UFCA	Worsbrough
15:00	Squires 19'; Skelton 52'; Holdsworth 82'			Stadium: The Totally Training Stadium; Attendance: 460

18 April 2026	Wakefield	2–2 (a.e.t.) (4–1 p)	Harrogate Railway Athletic	Pontefract
15:00	Salt 69'; Greaves 90'		Ingham 54', 73'	Stadium: Hunters Stadium; Attendance: 586

==== Final ====
25 April 2026	Worsbrough Bridge Athletic	2–0	Wakefield	Worsbrough
15:00 GMT	Grist 16'; Lasalire 62'	Report		Stadium: The Totally Training Stadium; Attendance: 1,617

=== Results table ===
Home \ Away	APF	ARW	ATH	BRG	CTC	CWC	D&D	DON	GHW	GOO	HRA	ILK	LUA	LOU	MAM	NMW	ROR	SLB	SLE	WAK	WIN	WBA
Appleby Frodingham	—	2–3	4–0	0–2	1–2	1–0	0–4	5–1	5–2	1–6	0–1	4–1	0–4	2–1	3–2	0–1	1–0	2–1	4–3	0–6	2–0	0–3
Armthorpe Welfare	1–1	—	4–1	3–2	1–0	4–1	0–4	2–1	5–0	6–2	1–4	4–1	3–3	1–0	3–1	5–0	0–3	0–2	2–2	0–2	1–1	2–3
Athersley Recreation	1–3	1–4	—	0–3	0–1	1–0	0–4	1–1	1–2	1–2	0–3	3–1	2–3	5–0	5–0	0–2	4–3	2–1	3–2	0–3	0–3	2–1
Brigg Town	3–1	3–2	4–2	—	1–3	3–3	2–3	4–3	2–0	0–4	1–0	3–1	2–2	4–1	5–1	4–1	0–1	3–1	2–0	2–1	3–1	2–1
Club Thorne Colliery	7–0	1–1	3–1	1–2	—	0–1	0–5	4–2	6–0	3–1	0–1	4–0	0–2	0–0	1–1	4–0	2–2	1–1	0–0	0–4	1–0	1–2
Crowle Colts	2–1	2–2	0–2	3–2	1–3	—	0–4	1–2	4–1	0–1	0–2	0–1	3–2	3–1	2–0	3–0	2–1	2–1	0–0	0–3	4–1	1–3
Dearne & District	2–0	7–1	4–0	1–0	2–0	6–0	—	2–0	3–0	3–0	5–3	3–1	2–0	3–0	2–1	7–0	2–1	1–3	3–1	4–0	1–0	1–1
Doncaster City	1–2	1–0	1–1	2–2	1–1	0–0	1–6	—	4–0	0–3	4–3	1–2	0–2	1–0	3–5	2–1	1–2	2–1	2–2	0–4	2–0	0–3
Glasshoughton Welfare	2–2	1–8	1–5	0–4	0–1	0–5	1–3	0–0	—	1–5	0–5	3–4	1–2	3–2	2–5	0–1	0–3	1–4	1–3	0–4	0–2	1–7
Goole	3–1	0–4	1–1	1–3	2–3	1–2	1–5	2–1	7–1	—	1–2	6–3	2–3	4–0	1–4	6–0	0–0	0–2	2–0	0–4	1–3	2–4
Harrogate Railway Athletic	5–0	4–3	1–1	1–0	1–0	4–3	3–1	2–3	10–0	3–0	—	1–1	3–0	5–1	2–2	3–0	3–0	3–0	2–0	0–0	4–1	3–0
Ilkley Town	2–3	0–1	1–1	3–1	1–1	0–1	2–3	3–3	5–0	4–2	0–3	—	1–4	1–1	1–3	3–3	3–2	2–0	1–3	1–5	3–1	0–0
Leeds UFCA	5–0	2–3	5–1	0–0	1–0	5–0	1–2	1–0	2–0	2–1	3–1	2–0	—	2–2	2–0	4–0	3–2	2–0	1–0	1–0	1–2	2–3
Louth Town	3–2	1–3	1–1	0–0	1–2	3–1	1–4	2–1	4–1	2–3	0–1	2–1	2–2	—	1–0	2–1	2–4	0–4	5–1	2–2	2–0	1–2
Maltby Main	4–2	0–3	3–0	0–2	1–2	2–1	2–1	2–1	5–1	2–2	0–4	0–0	2–1	1–0	—	0–2	4–2	1–3	2–0	1–2	4–2	1–2
Nostell Miners Welfare	1–5	1–2	1–1	0–2	0–1	1–2	1–3	1–3	3–3	2–5	1–2	0–0	0–2	0–2	3–1	—	2–0	0–3	0–2	1–3	0–1	1–2
Route One Rovers	4–1	1–3	7–0	1–4	5–1	6–2	0–1	1–2	5–3	4–1	3–0	5–1	3–0	4–1	4–1	6–1	—	6–3	4–0	1–4	9–1	3–2
Selby Town	2–0	3–1	3–1	1–1	0–4	1–1	0–3	6–0	5–0	1–1	1–2	0–0	1–3	1–0	4–0	1–1	0–4	—	3–3	1–2	3–0	2–4
South Leeds	2–1	3–3	2–1	4–3	3–3	1–4	1–1	1–2	2–1	2–0	3–1	2–3	2–5	6–4	3–2	0–1	3–2	3–2	—	4–3	4–1	0–1
Wakefield	4–0	5–1	3–0	1–0	0–0	3–2	4–2	3–0	0–0	2–0	3–3	2–0	2–3	2–4	3–2	3–0	4–1	4–1	4–1	—	3–0	1–2
Winterton Rangers	3–2	2–3	3–4	0–1	2–4	0–2	0–3	3–3	2–1	1–4	1–1	1–1	3–0	0–1	3–1	3–0	0–3	0–1	1–3	0–1	—	1–2
Worsbrough Bridge Athletic	3–0	2–0	2–1	4–2	1–2	0–3	0–2	2–1	3–0	7–0	3–3	3–0	3–0	4–1	3–0	1–1	1–0	3–2	3–2	1–1	4–0	—

Source: Northern Counties East Football League
Legend: Blue = home team win; Yellow = draw; Red = away team win.
For upcoming matches, an "a" indicates there is an article about the rivalry between the two participants.

=== Stadia and locations ===
Location of the clubs in the 2025–26 NCEL Division One on a map of Yorkshire and the Humber

Club	Stadium	Location	Capacity
Appleby Frodingham	Brumby Hall Sports Ground	Scunthorpe	1,100
Armthorpe Welfare	Welfare Ground	Doncaster (Armthorpe)	2,500
Athersley Recreation	Sheerien Park	Barnsley (Athersley North)	2,000
Brigg Town	The Hawthorns	Brigg	2,500
Club Thorne Colliery	Chesterfield Poultry Stadium	Doncaster (Moorends)	1,200
Crowle Colts	Windsor Park	Crowle	500
Dearne & District	Welfare Ground, Goldthorpe	Goldthorpe	1,000
Doncaster City	Welfare Ground, Armthorpe (Note: home of Armthorpe Welfare (groundshare))	Doncaster (Armthorpe)	2,500
Glasshoughton Welfare	Glasshoughton Centre	Castleford (Glasshoughton)	2,000
Goole	Victoria Pleasure Grounds	Goole	3,000
Harrogate Railway Athletic	Station View	Harrogate	3,500
Ilkley Town	Ben Rhydding Sports club	Ilkley	700
Leeds UCFA	Crofton Community Centre (Note: home of Nostell MW (groundshare))	Wakefield (Crofton)	1,500
Louth Town	Marshlands	Saltfleetby	500
Maltby Main	Muglet Lane	Rotherham (Maltby)	2,000
Nostell Miners Welfare	Crofton Community Centre; Crofton, West Yorkshire	Wakefield (Crofton)	1,500
Route One Rovers	Myra Shay	Bradford	500
Selby Town	Richard Street	Selby	5,000
South Leeds	South Leeds Stadium	Leeds (Belle Isle)	3,450
Wakefield	Post Office Road	Featherstone	6,954
Winterton Rangers	The MKM Stadium, Winterton	Winterton	3,000
Worsbrough Bridge Athletic	Park Road	Barnsley (Worsbrough)	2,000

== League Cup ==
2025–26 Northern Counties East Football League League Cup
Tournament details
- Country: England
- Teams: 42

Final positions
- Champions: Liversedge (2nd title)
- Runners-up: Rossington Main

The 2025–26 Northern Counties East Football League League Cup is the 43rd season of the league cup competition of the Northern Counties East Football League.

Quarter-finals

14 January 2026	Route One Rovers (D1)	2–0	Handsworth (PD)	Bradford
19:45	Khan 10' (pen.), 78'			Stadium: Myra Shay; Attendance: 57

3 February 2026	Frickley Athletic (PD)	0–3	Liversedge (PD)	Pontefract
19:45			Walton 24'; Swales 31'; Brown 72'	Stadium: Westfield Lane; Attendance: 114

3 February 2026	Horbury Town (PD)	3–4	Campion (PD)	Horbury
19:45	Jagger 38'; Roberts 70'; Kyeremeh 88'		Sykes 21', 45'; Billy 27'; Dickinson 72'	Stadium: Pulse Hire Ltd Stadium; Attendance: 58

4 February 2026	Doncaster City (D1)	1–5	Rossington Main (PD)	Armthorpe
19:45	Jones 37'		Gibbons 9', 36', 53'; Howarth 54'; Mantle 73'	Stadium: Marra Falcons Stadium; Attendance: 109

Semi-finals

7 April 2026	Liversedge (PD)	3–0	Campion (PD)	Liversedge
19:45	Dean 35', 90'; Donovan 50'			Stadium: Clayborn Ground; Attendance: 274

14 April 2026	Rossington Main (PD)	4–1	Route One Rovers (D1)	Rossington
19:45	Watson 20', 41'; Hannah 24', 85'		Thompson 89'	Stadium: Kalkut's Community Stadium; Attendance: 118

Final

5 May 2026
19:45

Liversedge (PD)	7–1	Rossington Main (PD)
Swales 15', 68'; Atkinson 25', 45', 81' (pen.); Stockdill 29'; Barlow 67'		Hannah 3'

Glanford Park, Scunthorpe
Attendance: 412
