= Wakefield A.F.C. =

English football club

Wakefield
- Full name: Wakefield Association Football Club
- Nicknames: Wakey, The Falcons
- Founded: 2019
- Stadium: Beechnut Lane, Pontefract
- Capacity: 1,200
- Owner: Fan shareholders with V02 Capital the majority shareholders
- Chairman: Guilherme Decca
- Manager: Adam Lockwood
- League: Northern Counties East League Division One
- 2025–26: Northern Counties East League Division One, 3rd of 22
- Website: http://www.wakefieldafc.co.uk/
Home colours

Wakefield A.F.C. is an association football club formed in 2019 and currently playing in the Northern Counties East League Division One at Step 6 (Level 10) of the English football pyramid.

== History ==
=== Formation ===
In March 2019, it was announced that a new professional football club, Wakefield AFC, would be established in Wakefield, which at the time was the UK's largest city without its own team. The club was founded by local businessman Mike Hegarty and was chaired by former Manchester United player and Sheffield Wednesday manager, Chris Turner. The new team was set to begin playing in the Central Midlands League for the 2019/20 season.

In August 2019, although intending to debut in the Central Midlands League, the club announced they were preparing for its first full season in the Sheffield and Hallamshire County Senior League, along with a new kit and sponsor.

=== COVID-19 Impact ===
Wakefield AFC entered the Sheffield & Hallamshire County Senior Football League for the 2019-20 season. However, the club's inaugural campaign was cut short and ultimately declared null and void after The Football Association announced the abandonment of all grassroots seasons due to the COVID-19 pandemic. The subsequent 2020-21 season also commenced but suffered the same fate, being officially curtailed before its conclusion as a result of ongoing national lockdowns and restrictions. Consequently, both seasons were declared null and void.

=== VO2 Takeover ===
In June 2020, Wakefield AFC announced a fan-ownership scheme, releasing 20,000 shares for public purchase at a price of £10 per share. The club later secured a significant investment from VO2 Capital, a US-based family office, in a deal that was finalized in July 2021. The investment, which effectively doubled the club's equity value, gives VO2 Capital the option to acquire a majority stake in the future. As part of the agreement, VO2 Capital's founder and CEO, Guilherme Decca, joined the club's board of directors, and the firm will sponsor a new Football Performance Department focused on analytics for scouting and recruitment.

=== Managerial Changes 2020-2022 ===
In May 2020, the club appointed Adam Lockwood as first-team manager, replacing Chris Turner, who moved back to the role of Director of Football. Lockwood managed the club until January 2022. At that time, Lockwood was promoted to the role of Sporting Director.

=== Takeover by VO2 Capital ===
In November 2021, VO2 Capital finalized its acquisition of a majority stake in Wakefield AFC. Following the investment, VO2 Capital's CEO, Guilherme Decca, was appointed as the club's chairman. The deal also included the merger of Wakefield AFC's women's team with Wakefield Trinity Ladies Football Club. The investment aimed to expand the club's football operations, educational programs, youth academy, and women's teams, with the long-term goal of creating a self-sustainable community asset.

=== Promotion to NCEL ===
In January 2022, QPR's Gabriel Mozzini was appointed as the new first-team manager, succeeding Lockwood. The appointment was announced by chairman Guilherme Decca as a key part of a wider reorganisation of the club.

When Mozzini was appointed, the team was mid-table, with promotion prospects looking doubtful. In an interview, Mozzini acknowledged that the club was "in no man's land" when he arrived, and the primary objective was simply to secure a top-five finish.

However, under his guidance, the team went on a remarkable 17-game unbeaten run to close out the season, which included a run of six consecutive clean sheets.

The turnaround culminated on 14 May 2022, when Wakefield AFC defeated Dodworth Miners Welfare 2-0 at home in the final game of the season. The victory secured the club's first-ever league title in front of a record crowd and confirmed their promotion.

On 12 May 2022, Wakefield AFC was promoted to Northern Counties East League Division One for 2022–23 season.

In their inaugural season at Step 6, the 2022–23 Northern Counties East League Division One, Wakefield AFC secured a 4th-place finish to qualify for the promotion play-offs. The club's campaign concluded in the play-off semi-finals following a 1–0 loss to Rossington Main on 15 April 2023.

Off the pitch, the club underwent significant financial changes during the season leading to club debt reducing by 85%, operational losses reducing by 60% and playing budget doubling

The new ownership also invested in the community and Wakefield AFC Juniors was formed for the 2023–24 season. Wakefield AFC Juniors started successfully with around 350 kids playing for the club from U7 to U15 age groups.

The season 2023–24 started with two major changes within the club organization. First, it was a complete redesign of the club's badge and visual identity. The club enlisted Christopher Payne (football designer) for the rebranding. During the Summer 2023 the club also moved back to Wakefield to play at Belle Vue (Wakefield). The move represented a big step towards building a financially sustainable future for the club as the central location and easier commuting helped increase attendance significantly, with a jump of more than 80% increase year on year.

Performance for the 2023–24 season was still inconsistent and in March 2024, Mozzini left his position as manager and the club appointed Junior Roberti as the new First Team Manager.

However, Roberti didn't last long, by October 2024 he was also gone, replaced by former Shirebrook Town manager Stephen Bodle who got them into the play offs again. Despite strong financial backing, Wakefield have finished 4th, 4th and 3rd in their 3 seasons at level 10 (step 6) and have failed to get promoted, losing in the play off semi final on each occasion.

On 18 August 2025, following a poor start to the 2025-2026 season, the club announced that Stephen Bodle and Lee Needham had been relieved of their duties as First Team Manager and Assistant Manager.

On 19 August 2025, announced former professional footballer Jason Blunt as the new First Team Manager, moving from Doncaster City.

== Stadium ==
The club play their home games at the Hunters Stadium, Beechnut Lane, situated near to the site of the former Prince of Wales Colliery in Pontefract, in a ground sharing arrangement with Pontefract Colliery FC.

=== Stadium History ===
Since its formation in 2019, Wakefield A.F.C. has had a nomadic existence moving between a number of grounds.

==== Dorothy Hyman Stadium ====
The club's journey began outside the city limits at the Dorothy Hyman Stadium in Cudworth, Barnsley, which served as their home for their initial two seasons.

==== Millennium Stadium ====
In 2021, seeking to move closer to their home city, the club entered a ground sharing agreement with Featherstone Rovers, relocating to the Millennium Stadium in Featherstone.

==== Belle Vue Stadium ====
A significant milestone was achieved in 2023 when the club finally secured a venue within Wakefield itself, sharing the historic Belle Vue with Wakefield Trinity for the 2023–24 season.

==== Return to Millennium Stadium ====
However, this move was short-lived, and for the 2024–25 season, the club announced a ground sharing agreement and its return to Featherstone's Millennium Stadium.

==== Hunters Stadium ====
In November 2025, the agreement Featherstone Rovers and Wakefield was terminated due to Featherstone's ongoing financial difficulties. On 10 November 2025, a new ground sharing agreement was signed with Pontefract Collieries FC was finalised, making the Hunters Stadium the new home of Wakefield AFC for the next two seasons.

==== Brooks Farm Project ====
Stadium	Location	Period of Use	Notes
Dorothy Hyman Stadium,	Cudworth, Barnsley	2019–2021	The club's initial home ground was located outside of the Wakefield district.
Millennium Stadium	Featherstone	2021–2023	Groundshare with Featherstone Rovers rugby league club.
Belle Vue	Wakefield	2023–2024	A significant move for the club to play within the city of Wakefield, groundsharing with Wakefield Trinity rugby league club.
Millennium Stadium	Featherstone	2024–2025	The club announced a return to Featherstone for the 2024–25 season.
Hunters stadium	Pontefract	2025- present	A two Season ground share agreement with Pontefract Collieries FC.

== Players and Staff ==
=== Players ===
As of October 2025

Squad Information
No.	Pos.	Player
Goalkeepers (GK)
	GK	(United States) Andrew Bremer
	GK	(England) Luke Mallinder
Defenders (DF)
	DF	(England) Bolton Makwedza
	DF	(England) Igor Mlynarksi
	DF	(England) Zante Rose-Campbell
	DF	(England) Mason Rubie
	DF	(England) Christopher Salt (c)
	DF	(England) Kenneth Effah
	DF	(England) Owen Thomas
	DF	(United States) Lorenzo Tejada
	DF	(England) Finlay Gledhill
Midfielders (MF)
	MF	(England) Oliver Robinson
	MF	(England) Tom Hinton
	MF	(England) Billy Mole
	MF	(England) Callum Nicell
	MF	(England) Oliver Rodriguez
	MF	(England) Mohamed Conteh
	MF	(England) Shamaul Bertie
	MF	(England) James Tetley
	MF	(United States) Lance Friedrich
Forwards (ST)
	ST	(England) Akeel Francis
	ST	(England) Eliel Maville-Anku

=== Staff ===
==== Current Staff ====
Position	Name
Manager	(England) Adam Lockwood
Assistant Manager	(England) Mark Maspero
First Team Coach	(England) Iain Trearty
Strength and Conditioning Coach	(England) Dylan Kirby

==== Managerial History ====
Name	From	To	Notes
(England) Chris Turner	June 2019	15 May 2020	Transitioned to Director of Football.
(England) Adam Lockwood	15 May 2020	13 January 2022	Transitioned to Sporting Director.
(Brazil) Gabriel Mozzini	13 January 2022	20 March 2024	Released.
(Brazil) Junior Roberti	20 March 2024	7 October 2024	Resigned.
(England) Stephen Bodle	15 October 2024	18 August 2025	Dismissed.
(England) Jason Blunt	19 August 2025	3 September 2026	Resigned
(England) Adam Lockwood	4 September 2026	Present	

== Records ==
- Best FA Vase performance: First round, 2024–25

== Performances ==
=== League Performance ===
Season	League	Position	Notes
2019–20	Sheffield & Hallamshire County Senior Football League	15	Season abandoned due to the COVID-19 pandemic.
2020–21	Sheffield & Hallamshire County Senior Football League	6	Season abandoned due to the COVID-19 pandemic.
2021–22	Sheffield & Hallamshire County Senior Football League	1	Promotion to Northern Counties East Football League.
2022–23	Northern Counties East Football League	4	Lost Play Off Semi Finals to Rossington Main F.C.
2023–24	Northern Counties East Football League	4	Lost Play Off Semi Finals to Shirebrook Town F.C.
2024–25	Northern Counties East Football League	3	Lost Play Off Semi Finals to Dearne & District F.C.
2025–26	Northern Counties East Football League	3	Lost Play Off Final to Worsbrough Bridge Athletic F.C.
2026–27	Northern Counties East Football League	TBC	

=== Cup Performances ===
==== FA Vase ====
Season	Round Reached	Notes
2023–24	First Qualifying Round	Lost to Droylsden F.C.
2024–25	First Round Proper	Lost to North Shields F.C.
2025–26	Second Qualifying Round	Lost to Chadderton F.C.

==== JCP Construction NCEL League Cup ====
Season	Round Reached	Eliminated By	Notes
2022–23	First Round	Campion A.F.C.	Lost 4–0 away.
2023–24	First Round	Beverley Town F.C.	Lost 3–0 away.
2024–25	Second Round	Hallam F.C.	Beat Dronfield Town F.C. 4–2 in the First Round before losing 1–0 to Hallam.
2025–26	First Round	Harrogate Railway Athletic F.C.	Lost 5–4 on penalties after a 1–1 draw at home.
