= Jason Blunt =

English footballer

Personal information
- Full name: Jason John Blunt
- Date of birth: 16 August 1977 (age 49)
- Place of birth: Penzance, England
- Position: Midfielder

Team information
- Current team: Wakefield AFC (manager)

Youth career
- –1995: Leeds United

Senior career*
Years	Team	Apps	(Gls)
1995–1998	Leeds United	4	(0)
1998	→ Raith Rovers (loan)	1	(0)
1998–1999	Blackpool	2	(0)
2001–2003	Scarborough	80	(8)
2003	→ Yeovil Town (loan)	1	(0)
2003	Doncaster Rovers	13	(3)
2003–2004	Tamworth	50	(1)
2004–2005	Halifax Town	25	(1)
2005–2006	→ Scarborough (loan)	5	(0)
2007	Sutton Town		
2007–2009	Goole		

International career
	England U18	2	(0)

Managerial career
- 2007: Sutton Town
- 2024–2025: Doncaster City
- 2025–: Wakefield AFC
- * Club domestic league appearances and goals as of 00:46, 24 March 2018 (UTC)

Jason John Blunt (born 16 August 1977) is an English football coach and former professional footballer who played in midfield. He is now manager of Wakefield AFC.

He was formerly the Leeds United academy under-23s manager in the summer of 2017, after a spell as development squad manager as well as under-18s manager.

== Playing career ==
He began his playing career with Leeds United, making a handful of first-team appearances in the Premier League for the club, making his first team debut under Howard Wilkinson, however, Blunt found places hard to come by with likes of Lee Bowyer, Carlton Palmer, Alf-Inge Haaland, Bruno Ribeiro, Matt Jones and Stephen McPhail all vying for places in Leeds' central midfield, before moving into the Football League and non-League football.

== Coaching career ==
Blunt, who managed Sutton Town for six months in 2007, now coaches sports and physical education at Wakefield Independent School while coaching at Leeds United Academy.

After coaching Leeds' under-12 team, after Richard Naylor left the club in the summer of 2014, Blunt became the new coach of Leeds' under-18s and the development squad manager. For the final five games of the 2014/15 season, Blunt assisted the then Leeds head coach Neil Redfearn in the first team after the suspension of Redfearn's assistant Steve Thompson.

On 5 August 2015, Leeds United appointed Daral Pugh as the head of academy coaching, effectively replacing Redfearn and Blunt (who had previously been filling in for Redfearn during his spell as head coach of the first team), and John Anderson became under-18s manager. Blunt was named as a coach to work alongside Anderson.

On 24 June 2016, Blunt was promoted to under-23s/development squad manager.

On 7 June 2017, Blunt left his position at Leeds to join Mousehole AFC.

In March 2018 Blunt left his role at Mousehole AFC to join I2I International Soccer Academy as Lead Coach.

On 1 October 2024, Blunt joined Doncaster City as manager.

== International career ==
During his playing career he represented England U18's in games against France and Scotland.

== Personal life ==
His son, Connor Leak-Blunt, is also a footballer, and after progressing through the academies of Leeds United and Sheffield United, entered non-league football.
