= Jacob Hazel =

Saint Kitts and Nevis footballer (born 1994)

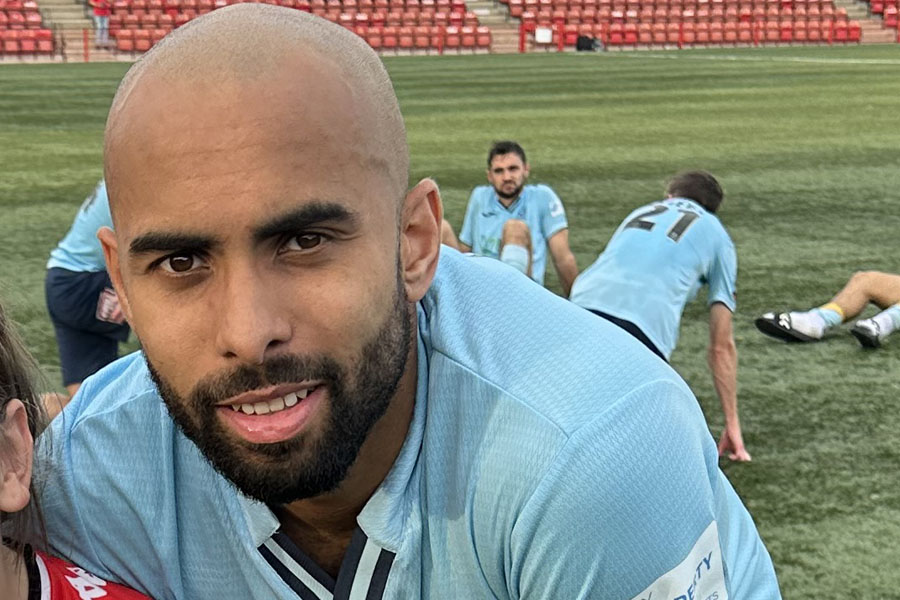
- Hazel in October 2023

Personal information
- Full name: Jacob Louis Hazel
- Date of birth: 15 April 1994 (age 32)
- Place of birth: Bradford, England
- Position: Striker

Team information
- Current team: Darlington (on loan from Chester)
- Number: 21

Youth career
- 2010–2012: Chesterfield

Senior career*
Years	Team	Apps	(Gls)
2012–2014	Chesterfield	2	(0)
2012–2013	→ Matlock Town (loan)	3	(1)
2013	→ Workington (loan)	8	(2)
2013	→ Sprint-Jeløy (loan)	13	(17)
2014	→ Buxton (loan)	4	(0)
2014	→ Bradford (Park Avenue) (loan)	1	(0)
2014	→ FC United of Manchester (loan)	2	(0)
2014	Ashton United	2	(0)
2014–2015	Mickleover Sports	32	(18)
2015–2016	Frickley Athletic	42	(19)
2016	Gainsborough Trinity		
2016	→ Farsley Celtic (loan)	12	(6)
2016–2017	Scarborough Athletic	20	(13)
2017–2020	Frickley Athletic	115	(88)
2020–2022	Whitby Town	50	(31)
2022–2023	Darlington	62	(21)
2023–2026	Boston United	73	(21)
2026–	Chester	9	(0)
2026–	→ Darlington (loan)	3	(1)

International career^{‡}
2016–	Saint Kitts and Nevis	9	(1)
- * Club domestic league appearances and goals as of 20:45 17 October 2026 (UTC) ‡ National team caps and goals as of 12:11, 21 April 2024 (UTC)

Jacob Louis Hazel (born 15 April 1994) is a professional footballer who plays as a striker for National League North club Darlington on loan from Chester as well as the Saint Kitts and Nevis national team. He began his career as a youngster with Chesterfield, with whom he made his Football League debut in 2012, and went on to have a long career in non-league football, as well as playing in the Norwegian fourth tier. He was born in Bradford, England, the son of former Saint Kitts and Nevis international footballer Des Hazel, made his first international appearance for Saint Kitts and Nevis in 2016, and represented them at the 2023 CONCACAF Gold Cup.

== Career ==
=== Chesterfield ===
Hazel came through the youth system at Chesterfield, where he turned professional in 2012. He made his professional debut on 4 September 2012, in a 2–1 win at home to Oldham Athletic in the Football League Trophy, replacing Scott Boden in the 64th minute. He made his league debut four days later in a 2–2 draw away to York City. He made his home league debut on 29 September, replacing Craig Westcarr in the 89th minute of a 1–1 draw against Torquay United. It was his final first-team appearance for the club.

==== Loan spells ====
During his time at Chesterfield he had a number of loan spells in non-league football. He was sent on a month's loan to Matlock Town in December 2012, and to Workington in March 2013 for the remainder of the season. In June 2013 he joined Norwegian fourth-tier Sprint-Jeløy on loan for six months. He returned to England in late October, and was signed on a month's loan by Derbyshire club Buxton in January 2014. After making five appearances, he was loaned to Bradford Park Avenue until 8 March. His final loan, which included a 24-hour recall clause, was to FC United of Manchester for the remainder of the season.

=== Later career ===
He was released by Chesterfield at the end of the 2013–14 season. He moved on to Ashton United, before Mickleover Sports manager Glenn Kirkwood got his much-wanted signature in October 2014. After helping them gain promotion to the Northern Premier League, scoring 18 in 32 games, he moved to Frickley Athletic in August 2015 helping them to a 7th-place finish in a great season for the club.

On 15 May 2016, Hazel signed a one-year contract with National League North side Gainsborough Trinity. He made his debut for Farsley Celtic on 17 September 2016, after joining the club on a three-month loan. In mid-December 2016 he was signed by Scarborough Athletic.

He agreed terms with Frickley Athletic for a return to West Yorkshire in June 2017.

Hazel signed for Whitby Town at the start of the 2020–21 season. In his debut season, Hazel made nine league appearances and scored five times before the Northern Premier League season was ended early following the COVID-19 outbreak.

On 6 May 2022, Hazel joined National League North side Darlington on a two-year contract, for an undisclosed fee. He finished the 2022–23 season as the club's top scorer, with 19 league goals and 21 in all competitions.

Hazel signed for National League North rivals Boston United on 21 November 2023; the fee was undisclosed. He scored 5 goals from 17 league appearances, and helped the team gain promotion to the National League via the play-offs.

Hazel signed for National League North club Chester FC on 22nd May 2026.

Hazel rejoined Darlington on a 3 month loan deal on 25th September 2026.

== International career ==
He was on the bench for the Saint Kitts and Nevis national team in the two 2018 FIFA World Cup qualification CONCACAF second round matches against El Salvador in June 2015. He made his debut for Saint Kitts and Nevis in a friendly 1–1 draw with Estonia on 20 November 2016, and played twice more in friendlies in 2017. Six years later, he was called up for Saint Kitts and Nevis' squad for the 2023 CONCACAF Gold Cup. He started both qualifying matches, wins on penalties against Curaçao and French Guiana that meant his team would play in the tournament proper for the first time in their history, but had been substituted in both before the decisive shoot-out. Grouped with Trinidad and Tobago, USA and Jamaica, Hazel was a second-half substitute in each match; Saint Kitts and Nevis lost all three.

== Personal life ==
His father Des Hazel is a former footballer who played professionally for Sheffield Wednesday, Grimsby Town, Rotherham United and Chesterfield, and represented Saint Kitts and Nevis in international football.

== Career statistics ==
=== Club ===
As of match played 12 April 2025

Appearances and goals by club, season and competition
Club	Season	League			FA Cup		League Cup		Other		Total	
Club	Season	Division	Apps	Goals	Apps	Goals	Apps	Goals	Apps	Goals	Apps	Goals
Chesterfield	2012–13	League Two	2	0	0	0	0	0	1 (Note: Appearance in Football League Trophy)	0	3	0
Matlock Town (loan)	2012–13	Northern Premier League (NPL); Premier Division	3	1	—		—		1 (Note: Appearance(s) in FA Trophy)	0	4	1
Workington (loan)	2012–13	Conference North	8	2	—		—		—		8	2
Sprint-Jeløy (loan)	2013	Norwegian Third Division	13	17	—		—		—		13	17
Buxton (loan)	2013–14	NPL Premier Division	4	0	—		—		1 (Note: Appearance in Derbyshire Senior Cup)	0	5	0
Bradford (Park Avenue) (loan)	2013–14	Conference North	1	0	—		—		—		1	0
F.C. United of Manchester (loan)	2013–14	NPL Premier Division	2	0	—		—		—		2	0
Ashton United	2014–15	NPL Premier Division	2	0	1	0	—		—		3	0
Whitby Town	2020–21	NPL Premier Division	9	5	1	0	—		1	0	11	5
Whitby Town	2021–22	NPL Premier Division	41	26	3	2	—		5 (Note: Three appearances and four goals in FA Trophy, two appearances and one goal in North Riding Senior Cup)	5	49	33
Whitby Town	Total		50	31	4	2	—		6	5	60	38
Darlington	2022–23	National League North	45	19	2	0	—		3	2	50	21
Darlington	2023–24	National League North	17	2	2	1	—		1	0	20	3
Darlington	Total		62	21	4	1	—		4	2	70	24
Boston United	2023–24	National League North	17	5	—		—		3 (Note: Appearances in National League North play-offs)	0	20	5
Boston United	2024–25	National League	42	13	2	1	—		6 (Note: Three appearances and one goal in FA Trophy, three appearances and one goal in National League Cup)	2	50	15
Boston United	Total		59	18	2	1	—		9	2	70	20
Career total			206	89	11	4	0	0	22	10	239	103

=== International ===
As of match played 3 July 2023

Appearances and goals by national team and year
National team	Year	Apps	Goals
Saint Kitts and Nevis
Saint Kitts and Nevis	2016	1	0
Saint Kitts and Nevis	2017	2	0
Saint Kitts and Nevis	2023	6	1
Total		9	1

== Honours ==
Boston United

- National League North play-offs: 2024
