= Humber Premier League =

Association football league in England

- Founded: 2000
- Country: England
- Number of clubs: 16
- Level on pyramid: Level 11
- Promotion to: Level 10; Northern Counties East League Division One
- Relegation to: East Riding County League Feeder Premier Division
- Domestic cup(s): National; FA Vase; League; League Cup
- Current champions: 2025-26: Hessle Sporting Club (League); South Cave United (Cup)
- Website: Official website

The Humber Premier League is a football competition for clubs in the East Riding of Yorkshire and north Lincolnshire areas of England.

== History ==
The league was formed in 2000. Reckitts won the league five times in the first six seasons of its existence. The league started with one division in 2000 but has since grown and now has two divisions, the Premier Division and Division One--the latter inaugurated for the 2005-06 season. The Premier Division sits at the 11th tier of the English football league system, and feeds the Northern Counties East League.

Since its formation in 2000, three teams from the Humber Premier League have achieved promotion – Hull United in 2015 (their stay in the NCEFL was just a single season), East Yorkshire Carnegie two years later and Beverley Town in 2022.

Barton Town joined the league when it was formed in 2000 but only stayed for one season before they joined the Central Midlands Football League the following season. Barton's Reserves team joined the league's first division for the 2017–18 season.

Cleethorpes Town had a three-season stint in the Humber Premier League, from 2006 to 2009–10. In their first season, they won promotion from the first division after finishing 3rd and after two further seasons, playing in the Premier Division, they decided to rejoin the Lincolnshire Football League for the 2010–11 season. They have since gone on to play in the Northern Counties East League and gained promotion to the Northern Premier League.

On 26 March 2020, the FA made the decision to abandon the 2019–20 season, due to the COVID-19 pandemic, for all leagues at Step 7 and below of the English football league system, meaning that any remaining fixtures of the season would not be played and all games and prior results that season would be expunged.

At the end of the 2021-22 season, it was confirmed that Beverley Town had been successful in their application to join the Northern Counties East League. Beverley finished in 2nd position in that season and as a result, were promoted to NCEL division one.

At the AGM for the 2023-24 season, it was decided that Division One would be merged with the Premier Division of the East Riding County League, thereby creating a feeder division for the Humber Premier League and the arrangement sees the HPL operating with just one division of 16 teams.

At the end of the 2025-26 season, it was confirmed that LIV had been accepted to join the NCEL Division One for the upcoming 2026-27 season, for the first time in the clubs history. This makes them the 4th team to be promoted from the HPL to NCEL, following Hull United, East Yorkshire Carnegie and Beverley Town.

Before the start of the 2026-27 season, Pocklington Town had confirmed via social media that their mens first team is to fold, and would be pulling out of the HPL. Pocklington had been in the league since its formation in 2000.

== Current member clubs (2026-27) ==
Club	Home ground
Beverley Town Reserves	Norwood Park, Beverley
Brandesburton	Catwick Lane, Brandesburton
Bridlington Town Reserves	Mounting Systems Stadium, Bridlington
Edgehill	George Pindar School, Scarborough
Goole United	Goole Town Cricket Club, Goole
Great Driffield	Cemetery Lane, Driffield
Hedon Rangers	South Holderness College 3G, Preston
Hessle Sporting Club	King George V, Hessle
Hodgsons	Beverley Leisure Centre 3G
Hornsea Town	Hollis Recreation Ground, Hornsea
Hull United	Haworth Park, Hull
Reckitts	Hull University 4G
Scarborough Athletic Reserves	Filey Sports Ground
Sculcoates Amateurs	St Mary's College 3G, Hull
South Cave United	South Hunsley 3G, North Ferriby

== Champions ==
Season	Premier Division	Division One
2000–01	Reckitts	—N/a
2001–02	Reckitts	—N/a
2002–03	Reckitts	—N/a
2003–04	Hutton Cranswick United	—N/a
2004–05	Reckitts	—N/a
2005–06	Reckitts	North Ferriby United Reserves
2006–07	Sculcoates Amateurs	Smith & Nephew
2007–08	Sculcoates Amateurs	St. Andrews Police Club
2008–09	Chalk Lane	Hessle Sporting Club
2009–10	Reckitts	Crown
2010–11	Sculcoates Amateurs	Hodgsons
2011–12	Reckitts	Scarborough Town
2012–13	Beverley Town	Goole United
2013–14	Beverley Town	Wawne United
2014–15	Sculcoates Amateurs	East Yorkshire Carnegie
2015–16	Wawne United	North Ferriby Athletic
2016–17	Crown	Hornsea Town
2017–18	Chalk Lane	LIV Supplies
2018–19	Chalk Lane	Beverley Town Reserves
2019-20	Season abandoned due to the COVID-19 pandemic	
2020-21†	Beverley Town	Cherry Burton
2021-22	Hedon Rangers	Hessle Sporting Club
2022-23	Pocklington Town	Great Driffield AFC
2023-24	Club Thorne Colliery	—N/a
2024-25	South Cave United	—N/a
2025-26	Hessle Sporting	—N/a

† Due to the COVID-19 restrictions, teams played each other once.

=== League Cup (Whiteheads Fish and Chips Cup) ===
Season	Winner	Result	Runner-up	Venue
2009-10	Beverley Town	1-0	Sculcoates Amateurs	Norwood Recreation Ground
2010-11	Hall Road Rangers Reserves	3-2	Brandesburton	Grange Lane, North Ferriby
2011-12	Scarborough Town	3-1	North Ferriby United Reserves	Queensgate Stadium, Bridlington
2012-13	Pocklington Town	2-1	Reckitts AFC	Bishop Burton College
2013-14	Sculcoates Amateurs	5-0	Westella & Willerby	Queensgate Stadium, Bridlington
2014-15	Hull United	4-0	Crown FC	Roy West Centre, East Riding County Football Association
2015-16	AFC Walkington	4-3	Wawne United	Roy West Centre
2016-17	LIV Supplies	2-0	Crown FC	Roy West Centre
2017-18	Chalk Lane	2-0	Pocklington Town	Roy West Centre
2018-19	Hull United	0-0 (4-3 pens)	Chalk Lane	Roy West Centre
2019-20	Competition abandoned due to the COVID-19 pandemic			
2020-21	Did not take place due to the COVID-19 pandemic			
2021-22	South Cave United	2-0	Goole United	Roy West Centre
2022-23	LIV Supplies	1-2	Reckitts	Roy West Centre
2023-24	South Cave United	2-2 (4-1 Pens)	Cherry Burton	Roy West Centre
2024-25	South Cave United	1-1(4-3 Pens)	LIV Supplies	Roy West Centre
