= Des Hazel =

Saint Kitts and Nevis footballer (born 1967)

Personal information
- Full name: Desmond St. Lloyd Hazel
- Date of birth: 15 July 1967 (age 59)
- Place of birth: Bradford, England
- Height: 5 ft 10 in (1.78 m)
- Position: Left winger

Team information
- Current team: Keighley Town (manager)

Youth career
- Sheffield Wednesday

Senior career*
Years	Team	Apps	(Gls)
1986–1988	Sheffield Wednesday	6	(0)
1986	→ Grimsby Town (loan)	9	(2)
1988–1995	Rotherham United	238	(30)
1995–1996	Chesterfield	21	(0)
1996–1998	Joondalup City	?	(?)
1998–2000	Guiseley	?	(?)
Total		274	(32)

International career
2000	Saint Kitts and Nevis	4	(0)

Managerial career
- 2026–: Keighley Town
- * Club domestic league appearances and goals

Desmond St. Lloyd Hazel (born 15 July 1967) is a football coach and former player who played at both professional and international levels as a left winger. He has been manager of non-league Keighley Town since May 2026.

== Playing career ==
=== Club career ===
Born in Bradford, Hazel played with the youth team of Sheffield Wednesday and made his senior debut for them in October 1986.

Hazel made a total of 274 appearances in the Football League for Sheffield Wednesday, Grimsby Town, Rotherham United and Chesterfield.

He later played in Australia for Joondalup City, and also went on trial with Perth Glory in August 1997.

After having issues with his visa, Hazel returned to England to play non-League football for Guiseley.

=== International career ===
Hazel represented Saint Kitts and Nevis at international football. He received his first call-up in March 1998, alongside a number of fellow English-born players - Andy Watson, Kevin Francis and Bobby Bowry. Hazel made his international debut in 2000, and earned four caps that year.

== Coaching career ==
Hazel worked as the Head of Youth Development at FC Halifax Town. He was previously the head coach of the Halifax Town School of Excellence, before becoming their youth team coach in July 2006.

Hazel has also coached at Manchester City, Bradford City and Leeds United.

He later worked for Bradford (Park Avenue) as an academy coach from October 2019, leaving that role in May 2020.

He was appointed as manager of Keighley Town in May 2026.

== Personal life ==
His son Jacob Hazel is a footballer who also played at professional level for Chesterfield.

== Honours ==
Rotherham United

- Football League Fourth Division: 1988–89

Chesterfield

- Football League Third Division play-offs: 1995
