= LIV F.C. =

Association football club in England

LIV
- Full name: LIV Football Club
- Nickname: The Lions
- Founded: 1998; 28 years ago
- Ground: Haworth Park
- Capacity: 1,250
- Chairman: Neill Dransfield
- Manager: Bill Gill
- League: Northern Counties East League Division One
- 2025–26: Humber Premier League Premier Division, 2nd of 15 (promoted)

LIV Football Club is a football club based in Kingston upon Hull, East Riding of Yorkshire, England. They are currently members of the Northern Counties East League Division One and play their home games at Haworth Park, where Hull United A.F.C. also play.

== History ==
=== Early years ===
LIV Supplies FC was formed in 1998, initially playing in local amateur Sunday leagues. In 2016 they joined the Humber Premier League, and they won the Division One title in their second season Premier Division runners-up in 2021, LIV repeated their second-place finish in 2026, and were promoted to the Northern Counties East League.

== Honours ==
- Humber Premier League Division One
  - Champions 2017–18
