= Field Olympic F.C. =

Field Olympic
- Full name: Field Olympic Football Club
- Founded: 2005; 21 years ago
- Ground: Olympic Park
- Chairman: Muj Malik
- Manager: Muj Malik
- League: Northern Counties East League Division One
- 2025–26: West Yorkshire League Premier Division, 1st of 15 (promoted)

Field Olympic Football Club is a football club based in Bradford, England. They are currently members of the Northern Counties East League Division One and play at Olympic Park, Bradford.

== History ==
Field Sports & Social FC were formed in 2005, joining the West Yorkshire League. They won the Division Two title in their first season, and were Division One runners-up a year later to win promotion to the Premier Division. Field became league champions in 2015, but were relegated back to Division One in 2022. They won promotion back at the first attempt, and in 2025 changed their name to Field Olympic. In 2026, they won promotion to the tenth tier of the English football league system, being admitted to the Northern Counties East League.

=== Records ===
- FA Vase
  - First round 2026-27
