= South Leeds F.C. =

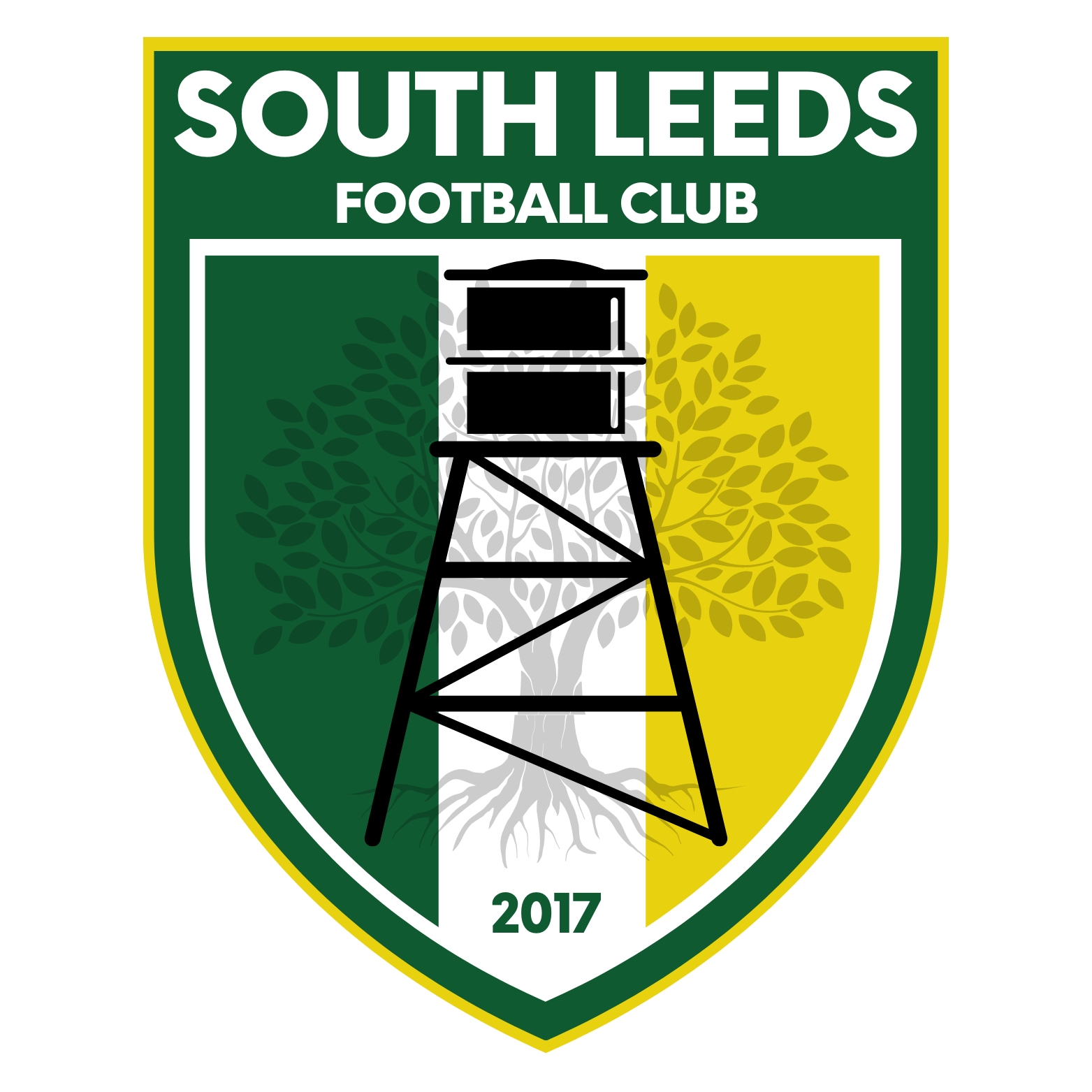
- Full name: South Leeds Football Club
- Founded: 2017
- Ground: South Leeds Stadium
- Capacity: 3,450
- Chairman: Reece Mudd
- Manager: Reece Mudd
- League: Northern Counties East League Division One
- 2025–26: Northern Counties East League Division One, 11th of 22

South Leeds Football Club is an English football club based in Leeds, West Yorkshire. They are currently members of the Northern Counties East League Division One and play at the South Leeds Stadium.

== History ==
The club was formed as Middleton FC in 2017 as a Sunday League Team in the Leeds Combination League, but the team withdrew during that same season. The following season they entered the Non League Pyramid in Saturday football joining the Yorkshire Amateur League.

Middleton started in Division 3 (6th Tier in Yorkshire Amateur League) and were crowned League Champions of Division 3 in their first season also winning the Hancock League Cup. As a result of their performances on the pitch they were promoted 4 Divisions into the Premier Division (2nd Tier in Yorkshire Amateur League) their debut season in the Premier Division was declared null and void due to the Coronavirus Pandemic.

The Following season Middleton were crowned Premier Division Champions and promoted to Step 7 football in the Supreme Division (Top Tier in Yorkshire Amateur League). Middleton won the Leeds & District Senior Challenge Cup in 2021–22 and the following season won the Yorkshire Amateur League Cup.

In 2023–24 they won the Yorkshire Amateur League Supreme Division title to win promotion to the Northern Counties East League. Less than a week after its promotion, the club was renamed as South Leeds FC, having merged with a local junior club.

During the 2024–25 season long term manager and club founder Reece Mudd stepped down from his role as First Team manager after 8 years in charge winning 6 promotions and 10 trophies with the club.

Ahead of the 2025–26 season it was announced that Craig Ogilvie was to become the new First Team Manager. Despite a strong start to the season the club announced that they had decided to part ways with Ogilvie in September 2025 following a series of bad results. The same week it was announced that Tom Claisse was to become the new Manager of the club.

During the same season it was announced in February 2026 that Tom Claisse was leaving the club after an approach from a Step 4 club. Reece Mudd returned to manage the club and they finished the season strongly unbeaten in their last 9 games to finish in the top half of the table on the final game of the season.

- Yorkshire Amateur League
  - Division 3 Champions 2018–19
  - Hancock Cup Winners 2018–19
  - Premier Division Champions 2020–21
  - Yorkshire Amateur League Cup Winners 2022–23
  - Supreme Division Champions 2023–24
- Leeds & District FA
  - Senior Challenge Cup Winners 2021–22
- Northern Counties East Football League
  - Promoted to Division 1 2023–24

== Season-by-season record ==
Season	Division	Level	League Position	Notes
2018–19	Yorkshire Amateur League Division Three	16	1st	Division Three Champions Hancock League Cup Winners Promoted To Premier Division
2019–20	Yorkshire Amateur League Premier Division	12	–	League season abandoned due to COVID-19 pandemic
2020–21	Yorkshire Amateur League Premier Division	12	1st	Premier Division Champions Promoted To Supreme Division
2021–22	Yorkshire Amateur League Supreme Division	11	2nd	Leeds & District Senior Challenge Cup Winners Yorkshire Amateur League Cup Finalists
2022–23	Yorkshire Amateur League Supreme Division	11	3rd	Yorkshire Amateur League Cup Winners Leeds & District Senior Challenge Cup Finalists
2023–24	Yorkshire Amateur League Supreme Division	11	1st	Supreme Division Champions Promoted To Northern Counties East Division 1 Leeds & District Senior Challenge Cup Finalists Yorkshire Amateur League Cup Finalists
2024–25	Northern Counties East Football League Division One	10	9th	
2025–26	Northern Counties East Football League Division One	10	11th	
2026–27	Northern Counties East Football League Division One	10		
