= Dearne & District F.C. =

Coordinates: 53.528688°N 1.311836°W

- Full name: Dearne & District Football Club
- Founded: 2018
- Ground: Welfare Ground, Goldthorpe
- Chairman: Antonio Jamasb
- Manager: Zephaniah Thomas
- League: Northern Counties East League Premier Division
- 2025–26: Northern Counties East League Division One, 1st of 22 (promoted)
Home colours

Dearne & District Football Club is an English football club representing the Dearne Valley area of South Yorkshire. They currently play in the Northern Counties East League Premier Division.

== History ==
The club was founded in 1982 as a youth team for the Rotherham area. In 2018 an adult side was formed and joined Division One of the Doncaster Senior League. After finishing third in their first season in the league, the club were promoted to the Senior Division. In 2021 they transferred to the North Division of the Central Midlands League. They were North Division runners-up in 2022–23, and after the league merged with the Midlands Regional Alliance, they were placed in the Premier North Division.

Mick Norbury was appointed manager in May 2023, but resigned in September despite the club winning their first eight games of the season. Jason Blunt was then appointed manager, extending the winning streak to 13, after which they applied for promotion to the North East Counties League. Promotion was secured by winning the Premier North Division title.

In August 2024, Dearne mutually parted company with Blunt, appointing former Saint Kitts and Nevis international player Zephaniah Thomas as their new manager in their maiden season in the Northern Counties East League Division One. Their second season at step 6 saw them promoted to step 5 as champions.

=== Season-by-season record ===
Season	Division	Level	Position	FA Vase	Notes
2018–19	Doncaster Senior League Division One	15	3/5		Promoted
2019–20	Doncaster Senior League Premier Division	14	-	-	Season abandoned due to COVID-19 pandemic
2020–21	Doncaster Senior League Premier Division	14	4/11	-	
2021–22	Central Midlands League North Division	11	12/18	-	
2022–23	Central Midlands League North Division	11	2/15	-	
2023–24	Central Midlands Alliance League Premier Division North	11	1/16	-	Promoted
2024–25	Northern Counties East League Division One	10	4/22	-	
2025–26	Northern Counties East League Division One	10	1/22	-	Promoted (champions)
Season	Division	Level	Position	FA Vase	Notes
Source: Football Club History Database

== Grounds ==
The club initially played their games at Dearne Valley College, before moving to the Kingsmark ground in Goldthorpe. However, after being refused planning permission for floodlights, in 2023 they moved to the Welfare Ground.

== Records ==
- FA Vase
  - Second Qualifying Round 2025–26, 2026–27

== Honours ==
- Northern Counties East Football League
  - Division One champions: 2025–26
- Central Midlands League
  - North Division champions 2023–24
- Mexborough Montagu Hospital Cup
  - Runners Up 2022-23
