= Wombwell Town F.C. =

Association football club in England

Coordinates: 53°31′30.0″N 1°23′43.1″W

Wombwell Town
- Full name: Wombwell Town Football Club
- Nickname: The Wellers
- Founded: 2018
- Ground: Recreation Ground, Wombwell
- Chairman: Karl Rose
- Manager: Karl Rose
- League: Northern Counties East League Division One
- 2025–26: Northern Counties East League Premier Division, 20th of 20 (relegated)

Wombwell Town Football Club is a football club based in Wombwell, Barnsley, South Yorkshire, England. They are currently members of the Northern Counties East League Division One and play at the Recreation Ground. The club was founded by former Barnsley players Karl Rose and Doug O'Connor.

== History ==
The club was formed in 2018, playing at the same Recreation Ground as the previous team of the same name that had folded in 2000. They joined the Sheffield & Hallamshire County Senior League and won the Division Two title at the first attempt in 2019. They were on course for promotion from Division One in both the 2019–20 and 2020–21 seasons, but both campaigns were cut short owing to the COVID-19 pandemic. Wombwell won the Division One title in 2022, winning promotion to the Premier Division.

In October 2020, the club attracted controversy when they signed Reece Thompson following his release from prison. A week after Thompson made his debut, the club released a statement to say that Thompson had left the club. The player had been signed as an amateur and received no money from the club.

In their first season of County Senior League Premier Division football, Town finished in fifth place, and having been the only team in the league to apply for promotion to step six of the National League System, were awarded a place in the Northern Counties East League for the 2023–24 campaign.

=== Season-by-season record ===
Season	Division	Level	Position	FA Cup	FA Vase	Notes
2018–19	Sheffield & Hallamshire County Senior League Division Two	13	1st/11	–	–	League champions, promoted
2019–20	Sheffield & Hallamshire County Senior League Division One	12	–	–	–	League season abandoned due to COVID-19 pandemic
2020–21	Sheffield & Hallamshire County Senior League Division One	12	–	–	–	League season abandoned due to COVID-19 pandemic
2021–22	Sheffield & Hallamshire County Senior League Division One	12	1st/14	–	–	League champions, promoted
2022–23	Sheffield & Hallamshire County Senior League Premier Division	11	5th/14	–	–	Promoted
2023–24	Northern Counties East League Division One	10	6th/23	–	–	
2024–25	Northern Counties East League Division One	10	2nd/22	–	3R	Promoted (play-off winners)
2025–26	Northern Counties East League Premier Division	9	20th/22	-	1R	Relegated
2026–27	Northern Counties East League Division One	10				
Season	Division	Level	Position	FA Cup	FA Vase	Notes
Source: Football Club History Database

== Ground ==
The club plays at the Recreation Ground, Wombwell.

== Records ==
- Best FA Cup performance: First qualifying round, 2025–26
- Best FA Vase performance: Third round, 2024–25

== Honours ==
- Sheffield & Hallamshire County Senior Football League Division Two
  - Champions: 2018–19
- Sheffield & Hallamshire County Senior Football League Division One
  - Champions: 2021–22
