= Route One Rovers F.C. =

Coordinates: 53°52′18.35″N 1°53′7.61″W

Route One Rovers
- Full name: Route One Rovers Football Club
- Founded: 2013; 13 years ago
- Ground: Marley Stadium, Keighley
- Manager: Sohail Abbas
- League: Northern Counties East League Division One
- 2025–26: Northern Counties East League Division One, 8th of 22
Home colours

Route One Rovers Football Club is a football club based in Bradford, England. They are currently members of the Northern Counties East League Division One and play at Marley Stadium, Keighley.

== History ==
The club were formed in 2013, choosing the name "Route One Rovers" as a joke about the route one playing style. They joined Division Two of the West Riding County Amateur League in 2015. They finished third in the division in 2015–16 and were promoted to Division One. After another third-place finish in 2016–17 saw them promoted to the Premier Division. When the league was dissolved in 2019 the club transferred to the Supreme Division of the Yorkshire Amateur League. In 2022 they won the Bradford District Cup. In 2022–23 the club were Supreme Division champions and were promoted to Division One North of the North West Counties League.

== Ground ==
In 2023 Route One Rovers agreed to a groundsharing agreement with Steeton to play at Marley Stadium in Keighley, moving from their home at the Zara Sports Centre in the north of Bradford.

== Records ==
- Best FA Vase performance: Second qualifying round, 2024–25, 2026–27

== Honours ==
- Yorkshire Amateur League
  - Supreme Division champions 2022–23
- Bradford District Cup
  - Winners 2021–22
- Yorkshire Amateur League
  - Cup champions 2021–22
- Keighley District Cup
  - Winners 2022–23
