= Leeds U.F.C.A. =

Leeds UFCA
- Full name: Leeds University Football Club Association
- Founded: 2010
- Ground: Crofton Community Centre; Crofton, West Yorkshire
- Capacity: 1,000
- League: Northern Counties East League Division One
- 2025–26: Northern Counties East League Division One, 5th of 22

Leeds University Football Club Association is an English football club based in Leeds, West Yorkshire. They are currently members of the Northern Counties East League Division One.

== History ==
The club was formed in 2010, but did not join the Yorkshire Amateur League until 2021. They won the Premier Division title in their first season in the competition, and in 2025 they were promoted to the Northern Counties East League. and will play their home games 21 miles away in New Crofton, groundsharing with Nostell Miners Welfare F.C..

== Honours ==
- Yorkshire Amateur League
  - Premier Division Champions 2021-22

== Records ==
- Best FA Vase performance: 2nd qualifying round, 2026–27
