= Louth Town F.C. =

Association football club in England

Coordinates: 53°22′44.3″N 0°8′27.4″E

Louth Town FC
- Full name: Louth Town Football Club
- Nickname: The White Wolves
- Founded: 2007
- Ground: MKM Louth Stadium, Saltfleetby
- Chairman: Stephen Clark
- Manager: Carl Martin
- League: United Counties League Division One
- 2025–26: Northern Counties East League Division One, 17th of 22 (transferred)
- Website: http://www.louthtownfc.co.uk
Home colours	Away colours

Louth Town F.C. is an English football club based in Louth, Lincolnshire. They currently play in the United Counties League Division One, whilst their reserve and academy teams play in the East Lincs Combination League.

== History ==
Louth Town Football Club were established in 2007 following the demise of Louth United. They played in the Central Midlands League until they were promoted to the Northern Counties East League in 2010.

At the end of the 2012–2013 season, Louth Town finished in their highest position of 3rd in the Northern Counties East League. Manager Daryl Clare, in his first season with the club as manager, took the club to its highest ever league position.

The club resigned from the Northern Counties East Football League at the end of the 2014-15 season and joined the Lincolnshire Football League, taking the place previously occupied by their reserve team.

In June 2016, Louth Town were blocked access to the Park Avenue group by the landlord who intends to use the land for development. Louth Town have relocated outside of the Town at the Marshlands facility in Saltfleetby.

In 2023, the club was promoted back to the Northern Counties East League for the 2023-24 season.

== Ground ==
Louth Town play their home games at the MKM Louth Stadium in Saltfleetby.

== Honours ==
- Central Midlands League Supreme Division
  - Champions 2009–10
- Central Midlands League Premier Division
  - Champions 2008–09
- Lincolnshire League
  - Champions 2022–23

Supplementary Cup Winners 2022–23

== Records ==
- FA Cup
  - First Qualifying Round 2011–12
- FA Vase
  - First Round 2009–10, 2010–11
