= Appleby Frodingham F.C. =

Association football club in England

Appleby Frodingham
- Full name: Appleby Frodingham Football Club
- Nickname: The Steelmen
- Ground: Brumby Hall Sports Ground, Scunthorpe
- Capacity: 1,100
- Chairman: Marlon Fell
- Manager: Joe Moloney
- League: Northern Counties East League Division One
- 2025–26: Northern Counties East League Division One, 15th of 22
Home colours	Away colours

Appleby Frodingham Football Club is a semi professional football club based in Scunthorpe, Lincolnshire, England. The club is currently a member of the Northern Counties East League Division One and play at the Brumby Hall Sports Ground.

== History ==
The original Appleby Frodingham were founder members of the Lincolnshire League after World War II. They were the works team of the Appleby-Frodingham Steel Company.

In 1978 they joined the Premier Division of the Midland League. When the league merged with the Yorkshire League to establish the Northern Counties East League in 1982 they were placed in the Premier Division. The club remained in the Premier Division until the 1985–86 season, during which the management and team moved to Winterton Rangers in mid-season.

The club subsequently folded, before reforming. After three years spent in local leagues, they rejoined the Lincolnshire League in 1990. They won the league in 1993–94, and in 2002–03 transferred to the Premier Division of the Central Midlands League. After finishing fourth in their first season, they were promoted to the Supreme Division. In 2008 they successfully applied to move up to Division One of the Northern Counties East League. In the 2015–16 Central Midlands League season they recorded a 23–0 win against Welbeck FC, the biggest senior non-league victory in over a century.

== Records ==
- Best FA Vase performance: Second qualifying round (2009–10, 2010–11)

== Honours ==
- Lincolnshire League
  - Champions 1993–94
