= Ilkley Town A.F.C. =

Coordinates: 53°55′44.21″N 1°47′11.19″W

Ilkley Town
- Full name: Ilkley Town Association Football Club
- Nickname: Baht ‘atters
- Founded: 1994; 32 years ago
- Ground: MPM Stadium, Ilkley
- Chairman: Robert Brown
- Manager: Jacob Mistry
- League: Northern Counties East League Division One
- 2025–26: Northern Counties East League Division One, 18th of 22
Home colours

Ilkley Town Association Football Club is a football club based in Ilkley, England. The Men's team are currently members of the Northern Counties East League Division One and play at the MPM Stadium, Ilkley. The Women's team are currently members of the North East Regional Women's Football League, Southern Division - Tier 6 of Women's Football in England.

== History ==
Ilkley Town were formed in the 1960s, initially competing in the Wharfedale League. In the early 1990s, the club dissolved due to sports such as rugby, hockey, and cricket having better facilities in Ilkley. In 1994, Ilkley were founded as Ilkley AFC, joining the Harrogate and District Football League winning the Division 3 League and Cup double in the first season, before securing a second straight promotion the following season. In 2004, the club joined the West Yorkshire League, changing the name of the club to Ilkley Town a year later. In 2021, the men's team was admitted into the North West Counties League Division One North. Ilkley Town's men's team entered the FA Vase for the first time in 2021–22.

For the season 2024-25, Ilkley Town Men's first team moved to the Northern Counties East League Division One. In the following season, Ilkley Town Women's first team were promoted to Tier 6, and competed in the preliminary rounds of the Women's FA Cup for the first time.

== Ground ==
The club currently play at the MPM Stadium at the Ben Rhydding Sports Club in Ilkley. In 2017, a 4G pitch was installed at the ground. and it has a capacity of 559.
