= West Yorkshire Association Football League =

Association football league in Yorkshire, England

- Organising body: West Riding County Football Association
- Founded: 1928
- Country: England
- Divisions: 5
- Level on pyramid: Level 11 (Premier Division)
- Feeder to: Northern Counties East League; North West Counties League
- Promotion to: Northern Counties East League Division One; North West Counties League Division One North
- Relegation to: Harrogate and District League Wakefield & District FA League Huddersfield & District League
- Domestic cup(s): League Cup: League Trophy: Headingley Reserves
- Current champions: Beeston St Anthony (Premier); Littletown (Division One); Kellingley Welfare (Division Two); Horsforth St. Margarets Reserves (Alliance One); Wyke Wanderers Reserves (Alliance Two) (2023–24)
- Website: Official Site

The West Yorkshire Association Football League is a football competition based in Yorkshire, England. It was previously known as the Leeds League until the name change in 1939. Although it is named the West Yorkshire League, clubs from the Harrogate and York areas of North Yorkshire also play in the competition.

Currently the league has three senior team divisions, and two for reserves. Officially part of the National League System, the Premier Division is a step 7 (or level 11) league in the pyramid. Clubs are able to be promoted to the Northern Counties East Football League or the North West Counties Football League Horbury Town in 2022 were accepted by the Northern Counties East League and Ilkley Town and Shelley were accepted by the North West Counties League in 2018, 2021 and 2023.

Some other teams who once played in the West Yorkshire League but now play their football at higher levels of the pyramid include Emley, Garforth Town Glasshoughton Welfare, Guiseley Harrogate Town, Harrogate Railway Athletic, Knaresborough Town, Nostell Miners Welfare, Ossett Town and Ossett Albion merged to form Ossett United, Pontefract Collieries and Thackley.

== Champions ==
An incomplete list of West Yorkshire League top division winners.

- 1979–80 Bradley Rangers
- 1980–81 Carlton Athletic
- 1981–82 Carlton Athletic
- 1982–83 East End Park WMC
- 1983–84 Otley Town
- 1984–85 Farnley WMC
- 1985–86 Farnley WMC
- 1986–87 Halifax
- 1987–88 Ferrybridge Amateurs
- 1988–89 Farnley
- 1989–90 Holbeck WMC
- 1990–91 Beeston St. Anthony's
- 1991–92 Carlton Athletic
- 1992–93 Beeston St. Anthony's
- 1993–94 Beeston St. Anthony's
- 1994–95 East End Park WMC
- 1995–96 Carlton Athletic
- 1996–97 Carlton Athletic
- 1997–98 Wakefield
- 1998–99 Nestle Rowntrees
- 1999–00 Nestle Rowntrees
- 2000–01 Carlton Athletic
- 2001–02 Horsforth St. Margaret's
- 2002–03 Carlton Athletic
- 2003–04 Aberford Albion
- 2004–05 Nostell Miners Welfare
- 2005–06 Leeds Met Carnegie
- 2006–07 Bardsey
- 2007–08 Carlton Athletic
- 2008–09 Knaresborough Town
- 2009–10 Bardsey
- 2010–11 Bardsey
- 2011–12 Beeston St. Anthony's
- 2012–13 Bardsey
- 2013–14 Bardsey
- 2014–15 Field
- 2015–16 Beeston St. Anthony's
- 2016–17 Carlton Athletic
- 2017–18 Carlton Athletic
- 2018–19 Carlton Athletic
- 2019–20 Beeston St. Anthony's
- 2020–21 Beeston St. Anthony's
- 2021–22 Horsforth St. Margaret's
- 2022–23 Carlton Athletic
- 2023–24 Beeston St. Anthony's
- 2024–25 Littletown
- 2025–26 Field

== Member clubs 2026-27 season ==
=== Premier Division ===
- Altofts
- Beeston St Anthony
- Carlton Athletic
- Glasshoughton Welfare
- Gomersal & Cleckheaton
- Hall Green United
- Harlow Hill
- Headingley
- Knaresborough Town Reserves
- Littletown
- Oxenhope Recreation
- Ripon City
- Robin Hood Athletic
- Silsden Whitestar
- Wyke Wanderers

=== Division One ===
- Bardsey
- Boroughbridge
- Brighouse Town
- Bradford (Park Avenue) Reserves
- Bramhope
- Horsforth St Margarets
- Kellingley Welfare
- Kirk Deighton Rangers
- Leeds City
- Otley Town
- Overthorpe Sports Club
- Oxenhope Recreation Reserves
- Pool AFC
- Rothley
- Wortley

=== Division Two ===
- Aberford Albion
- Beeston St Anthony Reserves
- Carlton Athletic Seconds
- Dewsbury Moor
- Headingley Reserves
- Howden Clough
- Huddersfield Amateur
- Hunslet Club
- Mount St Marys
- Robin Hood Athletic Reserves
- Sherburn White Rose
- Swillington Saints Reserves
- Wetherby Athletic
- Whitkirk Wanderers
- Wyke Wanderers Reserves
