= Horbury Town F.C. =

Coordinates: 53.654173°N 1.553506°W

Horbury Town
- Full name: Horbury Town Football Club
- Nickname: The Three Castles
- Ground: Slazengers Sports Complex, Horbury
- Capacity: 500
- Chairman: Joe mozalski
- Manager: Darren "Barnsey" Barnes
- League: Northern Counties East League Premier Division
- 2025–26: Northern Counties East League Premier Division, 16th of 20

Horbury Town Football Club is a football club based in Horbury, West Yorkshire, England. They play at the Slazengers Sports Complex.

== History ==
The club entered the West Yorkshire Association League in 2005, five years after a club of the same name had last played in the competition. They won the Second Division title in 2007, and in 2013 were promoted to the Premier Division after finishing third in the First Division. In 2022, they were promoted to the Northern Counties East League narrowly missing out on promotion to the Premier division after a play off defeat.

The 2024–25 season saw Horbury Town promoted to the Premier Division as Division One champions.

== Records ==
- Best FA Cup performance: First qualifying round, 2026–27
- Best FA Vase performance: Second qualifying round, 2025–26 (ongoing)

== Honours ==
- Northern Counties East Football League
  - Division One champions 2024–25
- West Yorkshire Association League
  - Division Two champions 2006-07
