= Keighley Town F.C. =

Association football club in England

Keighley Town
- Full name: Keighley Town Football Club
- Nickname: The Eagles
- Founded: 1948
- Ground: Cougar Park, Keighley
- Capacity: 7,800
- Chairman: Charles Wysocki
- Manager: Des Hazel
- League: Northern Counties East League Premier Division
- 2025–26: Northern Counties East League Premier Division, 12th of 20
Home colours	Away colours

Keighley Town Football Club is a football club based in Keighley, West Yorkshire, England. Established as Eccleshill United in 1948, the club played at Kingsway in Wrose from 1963 until relocating to Keighley and adopting their current name in 2026. They are currently members of the Northern Counties East League Premier Division and play at Cougar Park.

== History ==
The club was established before World War II but was disbanded due to the war. After reforming in 1948 as Eccleshill United, they were members of the Bradford Amateur League in the 1950s. The club won the Bradford Amateur League Cup in 1961–62, and later moved up to the West Riding County Amateur League, reaching the Premier Division in 1972 and winning the league in 1976–77. In 1982 the club applied to join the Northern Counties East League, but were rejected. The 1984–85 season saw the club win the Bradford & District Senior Cup, and at the end of the season the club were accepted into Division Three of the Northern Counties East League after making improvements to their ground. The following season saw the club retain the Bradford & District Senior Cup.

At the end of the 1985–86 season Division Three was abolished and Eccleshill were moved up to Division Two. They finished as runners-up in 1986–87 and were promoted to Division One. Despite only finishing fifth in 1990–91, they were promoted to the Premier Division. The club spent three seasons in the Premier Division before being relegated at the end of the 1993–94 season. After winning Division One in 1996–97, the club were promoted back to the Premier Division. In 2008–09 they finished bottom of the Premier Division and were relegated back to Division One. The club won the West Riding County Challenge Cup in 2013–14. The 2017–18 season saw them finish fourth in Division One, qualifying for the promotion play-offs. After beating Shirebrook Town 4–2 after extra time in the semi-finals, they defeated Grimsby Borough 3–2 in the final, earning promotion to the Premier Division.

In 2025 the club was purchased by the owners of Keighley Cougars rugby league club, the club already having agreed to play at Cougar Park in Keighley. The club was renamed Keighley Town at the end of the 2025–26 season.

== Ground ==
The club initially played at the Recreation Ground, before moving to Acre Fields in the 1950s. In 1963 land was purchased at a former quarry at Plumpton Park, which was developed into two football pitches. A clubhouse was built in 1974 and terracing installed in the early 1980s as the club looked to move up to the Northern Counties East League. In 2025 the club moved from Wrose to Keighley where the club shares Cougar Park with Keighley Cougars rugby league club.

== Honours ==
- Northern Counties East League
  - Division One champions 1996–97
- West Riding County Amateur League
  - Champions 1976–77
- West Riding County Cup
  - Winners 2013–14
- Bradford Amateur League
  - League Cup winners 1961–62
- Bradford & District Senior Cup
  - Winners 1984–85, 1985–86

== Records ==
- Best FA Cup performance: Second qualifying round, 1999–2000, 2001–02, 2002–03
- Best FA Vase performance: Fifth round, 1999–2000
- Record attendance: 948 vs Bradford City, friendly, 19 July 2017
- Biggest win: 10–1
- Heaviest defeat: 10–0 vs Bottesford Town, Northern Counties East League Premier Division, 28 July 2026

== See also ==
- Keighley Town F.C. players
- Keighley Town F.C. managers
