= Harrogate Railway Athletic F.C. =

Association football club in England

Coordinates: 54.000593°N 1.5050921°W

Harrogate Railway Athletic
- Full name: Harrogate Railway Athletic; Football Club
- Nicknames: The Rail, The Locomotives
- Founded: 1935
- Ground: Station View, Harrogate
- Capacity: 3,500 (300 seated)
- Chairman: Rob Northfield
- Manager: Fraser Lancaster and Robert Youhill
- League: Northern Counties East League Division One
- 2025–26: Northern Counties East League Division One, 4th of 22
| Home colours | Away colours |

Harrogate Railway Athletic Football Club is a football club based in Harrogate, North Yorkshire, England. They are currently members of the Northern Counties East League Division One and play at Station View.

== History ==
The club was established in 1935 by employees of the London and North Eastern Railway depot in the Starbeck area of Harrogate. They joined the Harrogate & District League, and as a railways team, they entered the British Railways National Cup, winning it in 1945–46. The club moved up to the West Yorkshire League, and were runners-up in 1951–52. They won the league in 1953–54, and after a third-place finish in 1954–55, the club joined Division Two of the Yorkshire League, with the reserves taking over in the West Yorkshire League.

In 1957–58 Harrogate finished third in Division Two, earning promotion to Division One. However, they were relegated at the end of the following season. Another promotion following a third-place finish in 1963–64 was following by another immediate relegation the season after. League restructuring in 1970 saw a Division Three created, which the club were relegated to, and in 1973 they left the league and dropped back into the Harrogate & District League. However, they rejoined Division Three of the Yorkshire League in 1980. When the league merged with the Midland League in 1982 to form the Northern Counties East League, the club were placed in Division Two North. They won the division in 1983–84 and were promoted to Division One North.

League reorganisation in 1985 saw Harrogate placed in Division One, and a fourth-place finish in 1986–87 saw them promoted to the Premier Division, a season in which they also won the League Cup with a 5–0 win over Woolley Miners Welfare. The club were relegated back to Division One after finishing bottom of the Premier Division in 1992–93, but returned to the Premier Division after winning the Division One title in 1998–99. In 2002–03 the club reached the first round of the FA Cup for the first time. After beating Slough Town 2–1 in the first round, they lost 3–1 at home to Bristol City in the second round in front of a record crowd of 3,500. The season also saw the club win the league's Presidents Cup with a 7–2 aggregate win over Bridlington Town. In 2005–06 the club finished third in the Premier Division, earning promotion to Division One of the Northern Premier League. In 2007 league restructuring saw them placed in Division One North.

In 2007–08 Harrogate reached the first round of the FA Cup again, defeating Droylsden 2–0 before losing 3–2 at home to Mansfield Town in the second round. They remained members of Division One North until being relegated back to the Northern Counties East League's Premier Division at the end of the 2015–16 season. In 2018–19 the club finished second-from-bottom of the Premier Division and were relegated to Division One.

The 2021–22 season saw them finish fourth in Division One, qualifying for the promotion play-offs. After beating Brigg Town 2–1 in the semi-finals, they lost 3–2 to North Ferriby in the final. The club were Division One runners-up the following season, before losing 1–0 to Horbury Town in the play-off semi-finals.

== Ground ==
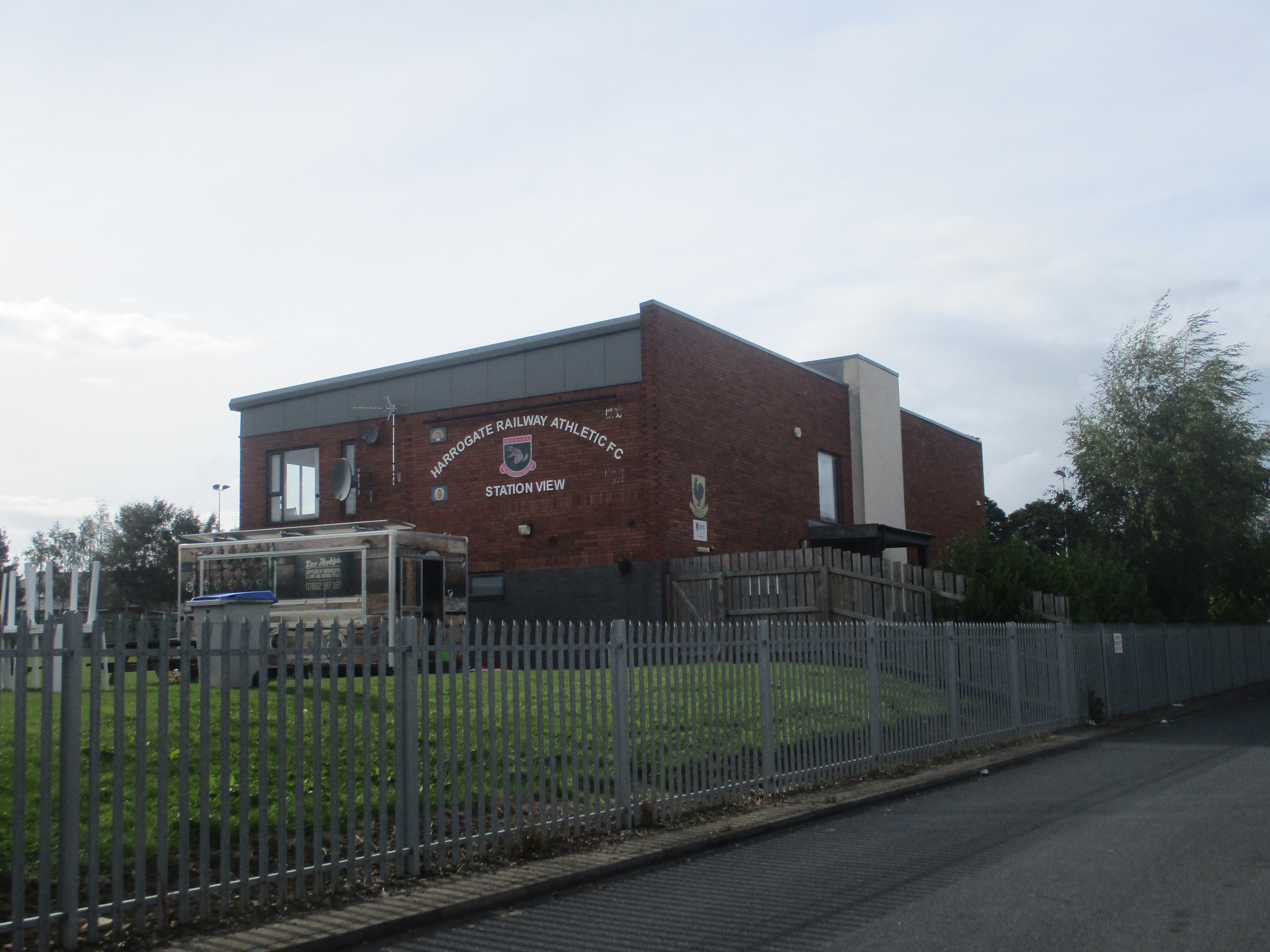
Station View clubhouse

The club bought its Station View ground in the Starbeck area of Harrogate with a £1,500 loan from the London and North Eastern Railway, with employees paying it off at 1p per week. Floodlights were erected in 1991 and inaugurated with a friendly match against Sheffield United. The ground currently has a capacity of 3,500, of which 300 is seated and 600 covered.

== Honours ==
- Northern Counties East League
  - Division One champions 1998–99
  - Division Two North champions 1983–84
  - League Cup winners 1986–87
  - Presidents Cup winners 2002–03
- West Yorkshire League
  - Champions 1953–54
- British Railways National Cup
  - Winners 1945–46

== Records ==
- Best FA Cup performance: Second round, 2002–03, 2007–08
- Best FA Trophy performance: Third qualifying round, 2010–11
- Best FA Vase performance: Fourth round, 1988–89
- Record attendance: 3,500 vs Bristol City, FA Cup second round, 2002

== See also ==
- Harrogate Railway Athletic F.C. players
- Harrogate Railway Athletic F.C. managers
