= Doncaster City F.C. =

Coordinates: 53.534677°N 1.05645°W

Doncaster City
- Full name: Doncaster City Football Club
- Nickname: The Danum Blues
- Founded: 2022
- Ground: Welfare Ground, Armthorpe
- Capacity: 2,500 (250 seated)
- League: Northern Counties East League Division One
- 2025–26: Northern Counties East League Division One, 16th of 22
Home colours

Doncaster City Football Club is an English football club based in Doncaster. The senior club played in the Northern Counties East League Division One.

== History ==
The club was established in 2022 by agent Willie McKay, and were initially placed into the Sheffield & Hallamshire County Senior Football League for the 2022–23 season, in which they were crowned champions of Division Two. However, they withdrew from this league after one season and instead joined the Central Midlands Alliance for the 2023–24 season.

They received national attention following a request to participate in the Scottish Cup, attempting to exploit a loophole arguing that Doncaster was a part of Scotland as the Treaty of Durham, which gave the city to Scotland, was never officially withdrawn. The club again reached national news in February 2024, after registering former international players Ross McCormack, Charlie Mulgrew and Wes Hoolahan.

The club won promotion to the Northern Counties East League in 2025 after winning the Central Midlands Alliance North Division the previous season. On 15th September 2026, Doncaster City resigned from the league and their record was expunged. At the time of their resignation Doncaster City had climbed to 5th in Northern Counties East League Division One table after their final game finished in a 4 - 3 victory at the Marra Falcons Stadium against visitors Ilkley Town AFC.

Under 18’s

The Doncaster City FC Under18’s team is still currently active and playing in the Doncaster and District Youth League Under18 Premier Division for the 2026/2027 season.

=== Season-by-season record ===
Season	Division	Level	Position	FA Vase	Notes
2022–23	Sheffield & Hallamshire County Senior League Division Two	13	1st/13	-	
2023–24	Central Midlands Alliance League Premier Division North	11	2nd/16	-	
2024–25	Central Midlands Alliance League Premier Division North	11	1st/16	-	League champions, promoted
2025–26	Northern Counties East League Division One	10	16th/22	2QR	
Season	Division	Level	Position	FA Vase	Notes
Source: Football Club History Database

== Ground ==
Doncaster City last groundshared with Armthorpe Welfare.

Doncaster City Under 18’s currently play their home games at Thurnscoe Sports Ground.

== Honours ==
Central Midlands Alliance League Premier Division North

Winner 2024/25 (promoted to NCEL Division One)

CMAL Buckingham Insurance League Challenge Cup

Winners - 2023/24

Runners Up - 2024/25

Sheffield & Hallamshire County Senior League Division Two

Winners - 2022/23
