= Winterton Rangers F.C. =

Association football club in England

Coordinates: 53°39′26.06″N 0°35′52.95″W

Winterton Rangers
- Full name: Winterton Rangers Football Club
- Nickname: The Rangers
- Founded: 1934
- Ground: The MKM Stadium, Winterton
- Chairman: Wayne Turtle
- Manager: Robbie Start
- League: Northern Counties East League Division One
- 2024–25: Northern Counties East League Premier Division, 19th of 20 (relegated)
Home colours	Away colours

Winterton Rangers F.C. are a football club based in Winterton, North Lincolnshire, England. They play in the Northern Counties East League Division One.

== History ==
The club was established in 1934. They were originally an intermediate side before becoming members of the Scunthorpe & District League in 1935.

Winterton have used just two grounds in their history. They were situated at Watery Lane until 1950 when a piece of land was purchased at West Street. In 1965 they joined the Lincolnshire County League until 1970 when they accepted an invitation to the Yorkshire Football League. Over the next decade they won the Yorkshire Football League on three occasions.

They reached the 4th qualifying round of the FA Cup in 1971–72 and 1976–77 and the Quarter-Final stage of the FA Vase in 1976–77. In 1978 they won the Philips six-a-side floodlight cup, beating Newcastle Blue Star in the Final. Their prize was six floodlights.

In 1982–83 they became founder members of the Northern Counties East League (NCEL), when the Yorkshire League and Midland League amalgamated. Just 2 seasons later the club disbanded due to financial difficulties. In 1986 Rangers then re-entered the NCEL Division 2 winning he title in 1989–90 and were promoted directly to the Premier Division. After 4 seasons they were relegated to the NCEL Division 1.

In November 2004, former Hull City and Wolverhampton Wanderers player Peter Daniel was appointed by the club. During his five-year tenure between 2004 and 2009, he led the team to their highest-ever league finish, culminating in a top-place finish in the Northern Counties East League Premier Division.

Rangers remained at Step 5 of the English football league system until the 2013–14 season, when they were relegated to Division One. The club stayed in Division One for the following seven seasons. Midway through the 2018–19 Northern Counties East League Division One campaign, Scott Hellewell was appointed manager, joining assistant Paul Grimes and coach Jon Taylor.

Following the curtailed 2020–21 season, which was significantly affected by the COVID-19 pandemic, the club secured promotion back to Step 5 under Hellewell. In the 2022–23 season, Rangers finished in second place and defeated Coggeshall Town 2–1 in the Step 4/5 inter-step play-offs, earning promotion to Step 4 for the first time in the club’s history, a notable achievement given the club’s limited budget. Rangers also managed to achieve cup glory, beating Golcar United in the League Cup at the Eco-Power Stadium.

The 2023–24 Northern Premier League Division One East campaign saw the side finish bottom of the table, resulting in relegation back to Step 5 despite an improved run of form towards the end of the season. Following the conclusion of that season, the management team departed the club to join Lincoln United after a successful period in charge.

The following season brought a second consecutive relegation, and the club currently competes in the Northern Counties East League Division One under manager Robbie Start.

== Ground ==
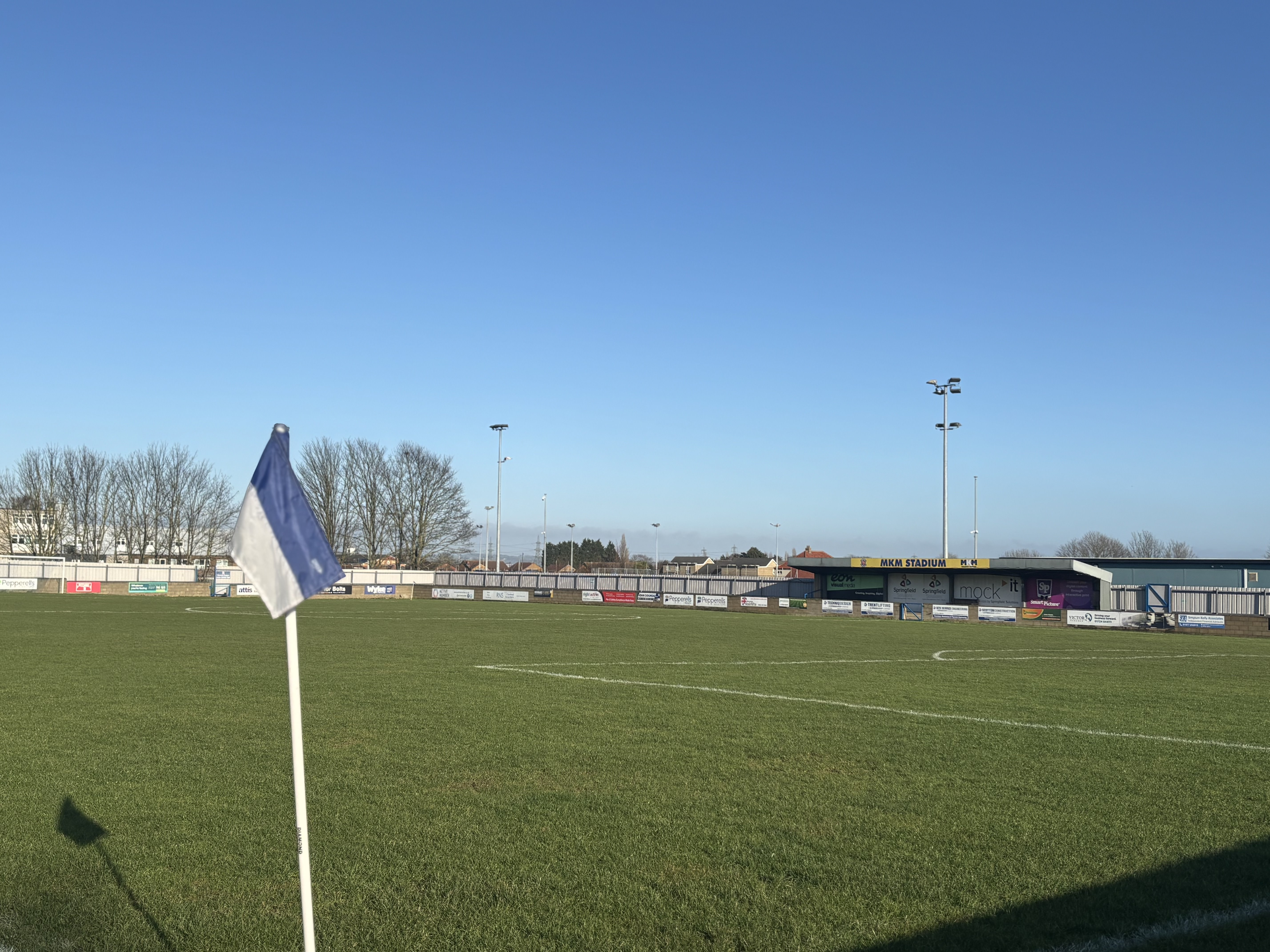
The MKM Stadium, home of Winterton Rangers FC.

Winterton Rangers F.C. have had a notably stable and traditional ground history compared to many clubs at a similar level. After forming in 1934, Rangers initially played at Watery Lane in Winterton, which served as their home during the early years of local competition. Like many small non-league venues of the time, Watery Lane was likely quite basic, with minimal facilities and infrastructure. In 1950, the club made a significant step forward by purchasing land on West Street and relocating there permanently. This move provided long-term security and allowed Rangers to gradually develop their own ground over time rather than relying on temporary arrangements or shared facilities.

Since that move in 1950, Rangers have remained at the same site—now often referred to as the MKM Stadium—making them relatively unusual in non-league football for their lack of relocation or groundsharing. The West Street ground has evolved incrementally across decades, hosting the club through its most successful periods, including Yorkshire League triumphs in the 1970s and later Northern Counties East League campaigns. Overall, their ground history reflects a steady, community-rooted progression, with only two home venues in over 90 years and a continuous presence in the town that has helped shape the club’s identity. In July 2023, the club smashed its record attendance in a Pre-season fixture versus Scunthorpe United which saw a total of 1621 people witness Rangers win 1-0 on the evening, smashing their previous record of 1,200 spectators versus Sheffield United.

== Honours ==
=== League ===
- Northern Counties East League Premier Division
  - Winners (1): 2007–08
  - Runners-up (1): 2022–23
- Northern Counties East League Division One
  - Runners-up (1): 2006–07
- Northern Counties East League Division Two
  - Winners (1): 1989–90
- Yorkshire Football League Division One
  - Winners (3): 1971–72, 1976–77, 1978–79
  - Runners-Up (1): 1977–78

=== Cup ===
- Lincolnshire Senior B Cup
  - Winners (1): 1969–70
- Northern Counties East League Cup Final
  - Winners (1): 2022–23

== Records ==
- Best in FA Cup : 4th Qualifying Rd. 1971–72, 1976–77
- Best in FA Vase : Quarter Final 1976–77
