= Northern Counties East Football League =

English football league

- Founded: 1982
- Country: England
- Number of clubs: 42; 20 (Premier Division); 22 (Division One)
- Level on pyramid: Levels 9–10
- Promotion to: Level 8 Northern Premier League Division One East
- Relegation to: Level 10; United Counties League Division One; Level 11; Central Midlands League North Division; Humber Premier League Premier Division; Lincolnshire League; Sheffield & Hallamshire County Senior League Premier Division; West Yorkshire League Premier Division; York League Premier Division; Yorkshire Amateur League Supreme Division
- Domestic cup(s): National; FA Cup; FA Vase; League; League Cup
- Current champions: Liversedge (Premier Division); Dearne & District (Division One) (2025–26)
- Website: ncefl.org.uk
- Current: 2026–27 season

The Northern Counties East Football League is a semi-professional English football league. It has two divisions – Premier Division and Division One – which stand at the ninth and tenth levels of the English football pyramid respectively.

== History ==
The league was formed in 1982 following the merger of the Yorkshire League and Midland League. For its inaugural season, the league consisted of five divisions. Since then, the league has undergone several changes to the point where since 2018 it has two divisions of 20 teams.

The league has maintained promotion and relegation between its divisions since its beginning. In 2015 a series of play-offs were introduced for the first time to determine a third promotee from Division One.

The competition has several feeder leagues at level 11 of the pyramid, which may provide new member clubs each year:

- Central Midlands League North Division
- Humber Premier League Premier Division
- Lincolnshire League
- Sheffield and Hallamshire County Senior League Premier Division
- West Yorkshire League Premier Division
- York League Premier Division
- Yorkshire Amateur League Supreme Division

Clubs are also liable to be transferred to other leagues if the FA deems it geographically suitable to do so.

== Current clubs (2025–26) ==
=== Premier Division ===
Location of the clubs in the 2025–26 NCEL Premier Division on a map of Yorkshire and the Humber

Club	Stadium	Location	Capacity
Albion Sports	Myra Shay	Bradford	500
Barton Town	Euronics Ground	Barton on Humber	3,000
Beverley Town	Norwood Recreation Ground	Beverley	1,000
Bottesford Town	Birch Park	Scunthorpe	1,000
Campion	Scotchman Road	Bradford	1,000
Eccleshill United	Cougar Park (Note: home of Keighley Cougars (groundshare))	Keighley	7,800
Frickley Athletic	Westfield Lane	South Elmsall	2,087
Golcar United	Longfield Avenue	Huddersfield (Golcar)	1,200
Handsworth	Oliver's Mount	Sheffield (Darnall)	2,500
Horbury Town	Slazengers Sports Complex	Wakefield (Horbury)	800
Knaresborough Town	Manse Lane	Knaresborough	1,000
Liversedge	Clayborn	Liversedge	2,000
Parkgate	Roundwood Sports Complex	Rotherham (Rawmarsh)	1,000
Penistone Church	Church View Road	Penistone	1,000
Pickering Town	Mill Lane	Pickering	2,000
Rossington Main	Welfare Ground	Doncaster (New Rossington)	2,000
Sheffield	Home of Football Ground	Dronfield	2,089
Tadcaster Albion	Ings Lane	Tadcaster	2,000
Thackley	Dennyfield	Bradford	3,000
Wombwell Town	Recreation Ground	Barnsley (Wombwell)	2,000

=== Division One ===
Location of the clubs in the 2025–26 NCEL Division One on a map of Yorkshire and the Humber

Club	Stadium	Location	Capacity
Appleby Frodingham	Brumby Hall Sports Ground	Scunthorpe	1,100
Armthorpe Welfare	Welfare Ground	Doncaster (Armthorpe)	2,500
Athersley Recreation	Sheerien Park	Barnsley (Athersley North)	2,000
Brigg Town	The Hawthorns	Brigg	2,500
Club Thorne Colliery	Chesterfield Poultry Stadium	Doncaster (Moorends)	1,200
Crowle Colts	Windsor Park	Crowle	500
Dearne & District	Welfare Ground, Goldthorpe	Goldthorpe	1,000
Doncaster City	Welfare Ground, Armthorpe (Note: home of Armthorpe Welfare (groundshare))	Doncaster (Armthorpe)	2,500
Glasshoughton Welfare	Glasshoughton Centre	Castleford (Glasshoughton)	2,000
Goole	Victoria Pleasure Grounds	Goole	3,000
Harrogate Railway Athletic	Station View	Harrogate	3,500
Ilkley Town	Ben Rhydding Sports club	Ilkley	700
Leeds UCFA	Crofton Community Centre (Note: home of Nostell MW (groundshare))	Wakefield (Crofton)	1,500
Louth Town	The MKM Louth Stadium	Saltfleetby	500
Maltby Main	Muglet Lane	Rotherham (Maltby)	2,000
Nostell Miners Welfare	Crofton Community Centre; Crofton, West Yorkshire	Wakefield (Crofton)	1,500
Route One Rovers	Myra Shay	Bradford	500
Selby Town	Richard Street	Selby	5,000
South Leeds	South Leeds Stadium	Leeds (Belle Isle)	3,450
Wakefield	Beechnut Lane	Pontefract	1,200
Winterton Rangers	The MKM Stadium, Winterton	Winterton	3,000
Worsbrough Bridge Athletic	Park Road	Barnsley (Worsbrough)	2,000

== Honours ==
=== Champions ===
Season	Premier Division	Division One	Division Two	Division Three
1982–83	Shepshed Charterhouse	North Scarborough Reserves; South Lincoln United	North Rowntree Mackintosh; South Woolley Miners Welfare	
1983–84	Spalding United	North Pontefract Collieries; South Borrowash Victoria	North Harrogate Railway Athletic; South Retford Town	
1984–85	Belper Town	Central Armthorpe Welfare; North Farsley Celtic; South Long Eaton United		
1985–86	Arnold	North Ferriby United	Lincoln United	Collingham
1986–87	Alfreton Town	Ossett Albion	Frecheville Community Association	
1987–88	Emley	York Railway Institute	Pickering Town	
1988–89	Emley	Sheffield	Ossett Town	
1989–90	Bridlington Town	Rowntree Mackintosh	Winterton Rangers	
1990–91	Guiseley	Sheffield	Hall Road Rangers	
1991–92	North Shields	Stocksbridge Park Steels		
1992–93	Spennymoor United	Lincoln United		
1993–94	Stocksbridge Park Steels	Arnold Town		
1994–95	Lincoln United	Hatfield Main		
1995–96	Hatfield Main	Selby Town		
1996–97	Denaby United	Eccleshill United		
1997–98	Hucknall Town	Garforth Town		
1998–99	Ossett Albion	Harrogate Railway		
1999–2000	North Ferriby United	Goole		
2000–01	Brigg Town	Borrowash Victoria		
2001–02	Alfreton Town	Gedling Town		
2002–03	Bridlington Town	Mickleover Sports		
2003–04	Ossett Albion	Shirebrook Town		
2004–05	Goole	Sutton Town		
2005–06	Buxton	Carlton Town		
2006–07	Retford United	Parkgate		
2007–08	Winterton Rangers	Dinnington Town		
2008–09	Mickleover Sports	Scarborough Athletic		
2009–10	Bridlington Town	Tadcaster Albion		
2010–11	Farsley	Staveley Miners Welfare		
2011–12	Retford United	Handsworth		
2012–13	Scarborough Athletic	Albion Sports		
2013–14	Brighouse Town	Cleethorpes Town		
2014–15	Shaw Lane Aquaforce	Clipstone		
2015–16	Tadcaster Albion	Hemsworth Miners Welfare		
2016–17	Cleethorpes Town	Hall Road Rangers		
2017–18	Pontefract Collieries	Knaresborough Town		
2018–19	Worksop Town	Grimsby Borough		
2019–20	Season abandoned due to coronavirus pandemic			
2020–21	Season curtailed due to local lockdown regulations			
2021–22	Grimsby Borough	Hallam		
2022–23	North Ferriby	Campion		
2023–24	Emley	Parkgate		
2024–25	Silsden	Horbury Town		
2025–26	Liversedge	Dearne & District		

==== Promoted ====
Since the league's formation in 1982, the following clubs have won promotion to higher levels of the English football league system – normally to the Northern Premier League –

Season	Club	Position	Promoted to
1982–83	Shepshed Charterhouse	1st	Southern League Midland Division
1986–87	Alfreton Town; Farsley Celtic; Sutton Town; Harrogate Town; Eastwood Town	1st 2nd 5th 9th 13th	Northern Premier League Division One; Northern Premier League Division One; Northern Premier League Division One; Northern Premier League Division One; Northern Premier League Division One
1988–89	Emley	1st	Northern Premier League Division One
1989–90	Bridlington Town	1st	Northern Premier League Division One
1990–91	Guiseley	1st	Northern Premier League Division One
1992–93	Spennymoor United	1st	Northern Premier League Division One
1994–95	Lincoln United	1st	Northern Premier League Division One
1995–96	Stocksbridge Park Steels	2nd	Northern Premier League Division One
1996–97	Belper Town	2nd	Northern Premier League Division One
1997–98	Hucknall Town	1st	Northern Premier League Division One
1998–99	Ossett Town	2nd	Northern Premier League Division One
1999–2000	North Ferriby United	1st	Northern Premier League Division One
2000–01	Ossett Albion	2nd	Northern Premier League Division One
2001–02	Alfreton Town	1st	Northern Premier League Division One
2003–04	Ossett Albion	1st	Northern Premier League Division One
2004–05	Goole	1st	Northern Premier League Division One
2005–06	Buxton; Harrogate Railway Athletic	1st 3rd	Northern Premier League Division One; Northern Premier League Division One
2006–07	Retford United; Sheffield; Carlton Town; Garforth Town	1st 2nd 3rd 4th	Northern Premier League Division One South; Northern Premier League Division One South; Northern Premier League Division One South; Northern Premier League Division One North
2007–08	Glapwell	2nd	Northern Premier League Division One South
2008–09	Mickleover Sports	1st	Northern Premier League Division One South
2009–10	Rainworth Miners Welfare	2nd	Northern Premier League Division One South
2010–11	Farsley	1st	Northern Premier League Division One North
2012–13	Scarborough Athletic	1st	Northern Premier League Division One South
2013–14	Brighouse Town	1st	Northern Premier League Division One North
2014–15	Shaw Lane Aquaforce	1st	Northern Premier League Division One South
2015–16	Tadcaster Albion	1st	Northern Premier League Division One North
2016–17	Cleethorpes Town	1st	Northern Premier League Division One South
2017–18	Pontefract Collieries; Pickering Town; AFC Mansfield	1st 2nd 3rd	Northern Premier League Division One East; Northern Premier League Division One East; Northern Premier League Division One East
2018–19	Worksop Town	1st	Northern Premier League Division One South-East
2019–20	No promotions		
2020–21	Bridlington Town; Liversedge; Yorkshire Amateur	Top 3 (Note: Ranked according to total points per game between 2019 and 2021.)	Northern Premier League Division One East
2021–22	Grimsby Borough	1st	Northern Premier League Division One East
2022–23	North Ferriby; Winterton Rangers	1st 2nd	Northern Premier League Division One East; Northern Premier League Division One East
2023–24	Emley; Garforth Town	1st 2nd	Northern Premier League Division One East; Northern Premier League Division One East
2024–25	Silsden; Hallam	1st 2nd	Northern Premier League Division One East; Northern Premier League Division One East
2025–26	Liversedge; Beverley Town F.C.	1st 2nd	Northern Premier League Division One East; Northern Premier League Division One East

== Cup competitions ==
=== League Cup ===
The league currently has one cup competition, the League Cup, which is contested by every club in the league.

==== Finals ====
Season	Winner	Result	Runner-up	Venue	Attendance
1982–83	Shepshed Charterhouse	1–0	Sutton Town		
1983–84	Ossett Albion	2–1	Ilkeston Town	Eastwood	
1984–85	Alfreton Town	2–1	Long Eaton United	Eastwood	
1985–86	Sutton Town	1–0	Bradley Rangers	Denaby	
1986–87	Harrogate Railway Athletic	5–0	Woolley Miners Welfare	Pontfract	
1987–88	York Railway Institute	2–1	Rowntree Mackintosh	Bootham Crescent	
1988–89	Bridlington Town	3–1	Emley	Pontefract	
1989–90	Ossett Town	1–0	Bridlington Town	North Ferriby	
1990–91	Guiseley	1–0	North Ferriby United	Ossett - Ingfield	
1991–92	North Shields	5–0	Armthorpe Welfare	Ossett - Queen's Terrace	
1992–93	Spennymoor United	2–1	Thackley	Ossett - Ingfield	
1993–94	Hucknall Town	4–1	Thackley	Ossett - Ingfield	
1994–95	Stocksbridge Park Steels	3–0	North Ferriby United	Ossett - Queen's Terrace	
1995–96	Ashfield United	8–2	Ossett Albion	Belper	
1996–97	Hucknall Town	3–1	Pontefract Collieries	Millmoor	
1997–98	Hucknall Town	1–0	North Ferriby United	Hatfield	
1998–99	Denaby United	1–0	Selby Town	Garforth	
1999–00	Garforth Town	3–1	Glapwell	Ossett - Queen's Terrace	
2000–01	Sheffield	2–1	Gedling Town	Alfreton	
2001–02	Alfreton Town	4–0	Armthorpe Welfare	Worksop	
2002–03	Ossett Albion	3–0	Sheffield	Brigg	
2003–04	Hallam	1–0	Mickleover Sports	Buxton	
2004–05	Sheffield	2–1	Harrogate Railway Athletic	Ossett - Queen's Terrace	250
2005–06	Liversedge	5–1(agg)	Sheffield	1L: Sheffield; 2L: Liversedge	1L: 2L:
2006–07	Mickleover Sports	1–1(p)	Garforth Town	Sheffield	243
2007–08	Winterton Rangers	3–1	Parkgate	Staveley	213
2008–09	Long Eaton United	4–0	Selby Town	Staveley	260
2009–10	Dinnington Town	5–2	Armthorpe Welfare	Staveley	195
2010–11	Farsley	3–0	Winterton Rangers	Staveley	235
2011–12	Thackley	3–2	Shirebrook Town	Parkgate	272
2012–13	Thackley	3–1	Louth Town	Staveley	225
2013–14	Knaresborough Town	2–2(p)	Eccleshill United	Valley Parade	390
2014–15	Handsworth Parramore	4–3	Cleethorpes Town	Staveley	376
2015–16	Cleethorpes Town	3–2	Tadcaster Albion	Garforth	423
2016–17	Penistone Church	4–1	Bridlington Town	Bramall Lane	485
2017–18	Cup withdrawn; final abandoned				
2018–19	Worksop Town	3–1	Liversedge	Doncaster	1,075
2019–20	Final not played				
2020–21	Cancelled				
2021–22	Barton Town	3–2	Garforth Town	Doncaster	718
2022–23	Winterton Rangers	1–1	Golcar United	Doncaster	810
2023–24	Parkgate	3–0	Emley	Scunthorpe	667
2024–25	Beverley Town	3–2	Knaresborough Town	Scunthorpe	587
2025–26	Liversedge	7–1	Rossington Main	Scunthorpe	412

=== President's Cup and Trophy ===
In the past the league has had additional cup competitions. The Trophy was contested by the Division One clubs and the President's Cup which featured the top eight teams in each division from the previous season, provided they remain in the league.

==== Winners ====
Season	President's Cup	Trophy
1990–91	North Ferriby United	
1991–92	North Shields	
1992–93	Maltby Miners Welfare	
1993–94	Lincoln United	
1994–95	Arnold Town	
1995–96	Belper Town	Pontefract Collieries
1996–97	Hucknall Town	Garforth Town
1997–98	Glasshoughton Welfare	Staveley Miners Welfare
1998–99	North Ferriby United	Yorkshire Amateur
1999–00	North Ferriby United	Goole
2000–01	Selby Town	Pickering Town
2001–02	Alfreton Town	Bridlington Town
2002–03	Harrogate Railway Athletic	Mickleover Sports
2003–04	Eastwood Town	Hall Road Rangers
2004–05	Buxton	Lincoln Moorlands
2005–06	Buxton	Retford United
2006–07	Retford United	Parkgate
2007–08	Liversedge	Hall Road Rangers
2008–09	Nostell	Staveley Miners Welfare
2009–10	Winterton Rangers	Staveley Miners Welfare
2010–11	Tadcaster Albion	Glasshoughton Welfare
2011–12	Handsworth	Grimsby Borough

== Member clubs in national competitions ==
=== FA Cup first round ===
The following NCEL clubs have reached the First Round proper of the FA Cup –

Season	NCEL Club	Round	Venue	Result	Opponents
1982–83	Shepshed Charterhouse	1st	Away	Lost 1–5	Preston North End
1990–91	Spennymoor United	1st	Away	Lost 2–3	Chesterfield
2001–02	Brigg Town	1st	Away	Lost 1–4	Tranmere Rovers
2002–03	Harrogate Railway Athletic	1st 2nd	Away; Home	Won 2–1; Lost 1–3	Slough Town; Bristol City

=== FA Vase finalists ===
The following NCEL clubs have reached the Final of the FA Vase –

Season	NCEL Club	Result	Opponents
1987–88	Emley	Lost 0–1	Colne Dynamoes
1989–90	Bridlington Town	Lost 0–1	Yeading
1990–91	Guiseley	Won 3–1	Gresley Rovers
1995–96	Brigg Town	Won 3–0	Clitheroe
1996–97	North Ferriby United	Lost 0–3	Whitby Town
2002–03	Brigg Town	Won 2–1	AFC Sudbury
2016–17	Cleethorpes Town	Lost 0–4	South Shields
