= 2023–24 Northern Counties East Football League =

The 2023–24 season was the 42nd in the history of the Northern Counties East Football League, a football competition in England.

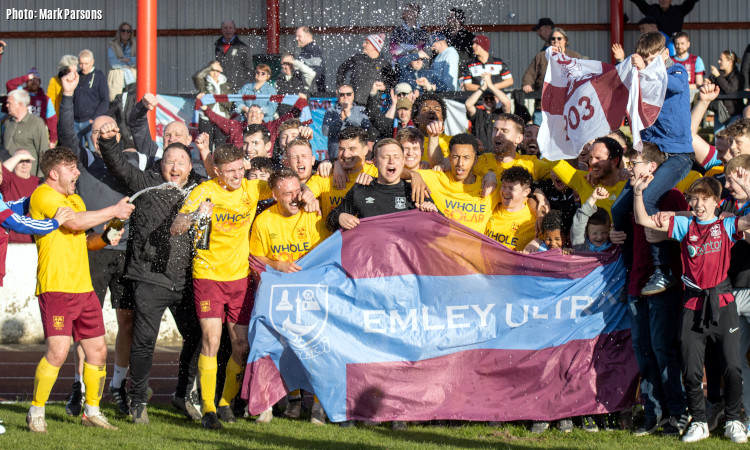
Emley celebrate winning the 2023-24 Northern Counties East League title at Goole in March 2024

The allocations for Steps 5 and 6 this season were announced by The Football Association on 15 May 2023. Starting this season, the Premier Division (Step 5) in the league promotes two clubs; one as champions and one via a four-team play-off. This replaced the previous inter-step play-off system. For this season only, there was only one club relegated from the division.

Emley were confirmed as Premier Division champions following a 5-0 away win at Goole on 30 March 2024 and were presented with the league trophy a week later in their final home game against Golcar United. Parkgate were confirmed as Division One winners on 25 April. Both divisional champions contested the League Cup final with Parkgate coming out as winners and therefore league and cup double winners.

== Premier Division ==
Northern Counties East Football League Premier Division
- Season: 2023–24
- Champions: Emley
- Promoted: Emley; Garforth Town
- Relegated: Maltby Main
- Matches: 380
- Goals: 1,387 (3.65 per match)
- Biggest home win: Silsden 9–1 Pickering Town (9 September 2023); Garforth Town 8–0 Maltby Main (16 March 2024)
- Biggest away win: Goole 0–8 Frickley Athletic (17 October 2023)
- Highest scoring: Campion 8–3 Maltby Main (11 October 2023); Emley 9–2 Bottesford Town (23 December 2023)
- Longest winning run: Garforth Town (3 games)
- Longest unbeaten run: Tadcaster Albion (9 games)
- Longest losing run: Pickering Town (8 games)
- Highest attendance: 823 (Hallam 2–2 Barton Town, 14 October 2023)
- Lowest attendance: 37 (Eccleshill United 2–2 Penistone Church, 13 March 2024)
- Average attendance: 181

The Premier Division featured 16 clubs which competed in the previous season, along with four new clubs:

- Campion, promoted from Division One
- Pickering Town, transferred from the Northern League
- Rossington Main, promoted from Division One
- Tadcaster Albion, relegated from the Northern Premier League

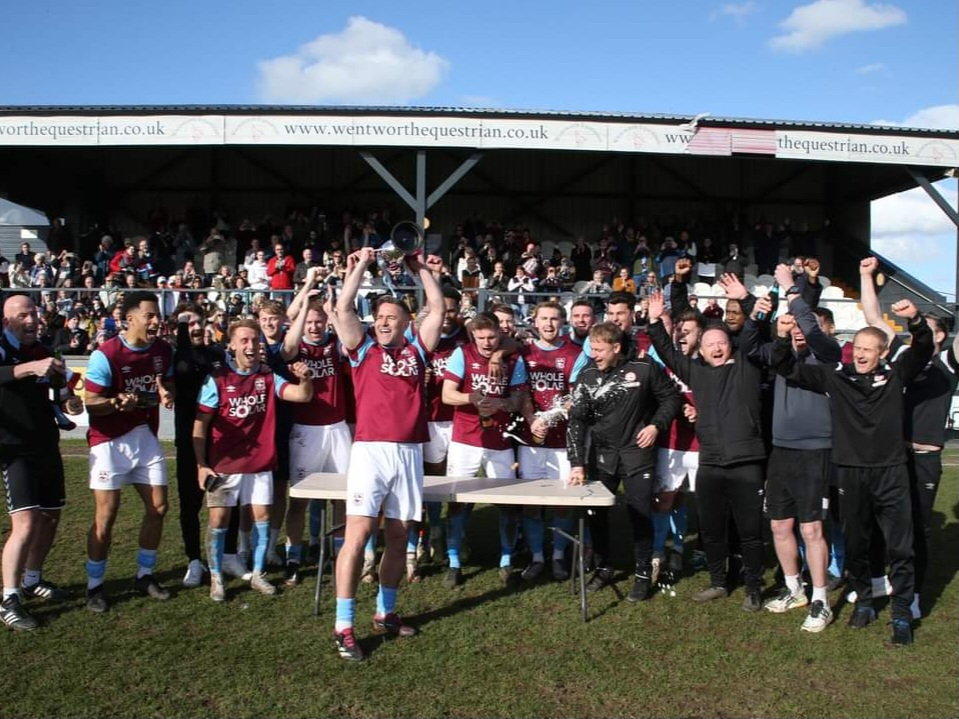
Emley lift the 2023-24 NCEL Premier Division trophy

=== League table ===
| Pos | Team | Pld | W | D | L | GF | GA | GD | Pts | Promotion, qualification or relegation |
|---|---|---|---|---|---|---|---|---|---|---|
| 1 | Emley (C, P) | 38 | 26 | 7 | 5 | 99 | 29 | +70 | 85 | Promotion to the Northern Premier League |
| 2 | Campion | 38 | 23 | 7 | 8 | 106 | 68 | +38 | 76 | Qualification for the play-offs |
| 3 | Garforth Town (O, P) | 38 | 24 | 3 | 11 | 102 | 47 | +55 | 75 | Qualification for the play-offs |
| 4 | Rossington Main | 38 | 22 | 6 | 10 | 72 | 49 | +23 | 72 | Qualification for the play-offs |
| 5 | Albion Sports | 38 | 21 | 7 | 10 | 68 | 50 | +18 | 67 (Note: Albion Sports were deducted three points for fielding an ineligible player.) | Qualification for the play-offs |
| 6 | Penistone Church | 38 | 19 | 5 | 14 | 79 | 64 | +15 | 62 | |
| 7 | Thackley | 38 | 18 | 7 | 13 | 61 | 57 | +4 | 61 | |
| 8 | Knaresborough Town | 38 | 17 | 9 | 12 | 74 | 58 | +16 | 60 | |
| 9 | Hallam | 38 | 17 | 8 | 13 | 71 | 59 | +12 | 59 | |
| 10 | Silsden | 38 | 19 | 1 | 18 | 76 | 66 | +10 | 58 | |
| 11 | Tadcaster Albion | 38 | 15 | 8 | 15 | 62 | 65 | −3 | 53 | |
| 12 | Golcar United | 38 | 15 | 7 | 16 | 76 | 66 | +10 | 52 | |
| 13 | Handsworth | 38 | 12 | 8 | 18 | 59 | 77 | −18 | 44 | |
| 14 | Barton Town | 38 | 12 | 7 | 19 | 64 | 80 | −16 | 43 | |
| 15 | Frickley Athletic | 38 | 12 | 6 | 20 | 62 | 79 | −17 | 42 | |
| 16 | Eccleshill United | 38 | 12 | 5 | 21 | 51 | 75 | −24 | 41 | |
| 17 | Bottesford Town | 38 | 9 | 8 | 21 | 51 | 89 | −38 | 35 | |
| 18 | Goole | 38 | 10 | 4 | 24 | 56 | 112 | −56 | 34 | |
| 19 | Pickering Town | 38 | 8 | 6 | 24 | 52 | 98 | −46 | 30 | |
| 20 | Maltby Main (R) | 38 | 7 | 5 | 26 | 46 | 99 | −53 | 26 | Relegation to Division One |

Source: Northern Counties East Football League
Rules for classification: 1) points; 2) goal difference; 3) number of goals scored; 4) number of matches won; 5) head-to-head results
(C) Champions; (O) Play-off winners; (P) Promoted; (R) Relegated

=== Play-offs ===
Semi-finals
2 | Campion | 0
5 | Albion Sports | 2
3 | Garforth Town | 0 (4)
4 | Rossington Main | 0 (2)

Final
3 | Garforth Town | 0 (5)
5 | Albion Sports | 0 (3)

==== Semifinals ====
| 27 April | Campion | 0–2 | Albion Sports | Manningham |
| 15:00 | | Report | Flynn 48' (pen.), 50' | Stadium: Scotchman Road; Attendance: 303 |

| 27 April | Garforth Town | 0–0 (4–2 p) | Rossington Main | Garforth |
| 15:00 | | Report | | Stadium: Wheatley Park; Attendance: 976 |

==== Final ====
| 4 May | Garforth Town | 0–0 (a.e.t.) (5–3 p) | Albion Sports | Garforth |
| | | Report | | Stadium: Wheatley Park; Attendance: 1,391 |

=== Stadia and locations ===
Location of the Premier Division clubs

| Club | Stadium | Capacity |
|---|---|---|
| Albion Sports | Horsfall Stadium (Note: home of Bradford (Park Avenue) (groundshare)) | 3,500 |
| Barton Town | Euronics Ground | 3,000 |
| Bottesford Town | Birch Park | 1,000 |
| Campion | Scotchman Road | 1,000 |
| Eccleshill United | Kings Way | 2,225 |
| Emley | Fantastic Media Welfare Ground | 2,000 |
| Frickley Athletic | Westfield Lane | 2,087 |
| Garforth Town | Wheatley Park | 3,000 |
| Golcar United | Skye Direct Stadium | 1,200 |
| Goole | Victoria Pleasure Grounds | 3,000 |
| Hallam | Sandygate | 1,300 |
| Handsworth | Oliver's Mount | 2,500 |
| Knaresborough Town | Manse Lane | 1,000 |
| Maltby Main | Muglet Lane | 2,000 |
| Penistone Church | Church View Road | 1,000 |
| Pickering Town | Mill Lane | 2,000 |
| Rossington Main | Welfare Ground | 2,000 |
| Silsden | Keighley Road Stadium | 1,500 |
| Tadcaster Albion | Ings Lane | 2,000 |
| Thackley | Dennyfield | 3,000 |

=== Top goalscorers ===
(all competitions)

| Rank | Player | Club | Goals |
|---|---|---|---|
| 1 | Ruben Jerome | Emley | 39 |
| 2 | Robbie Fox | Albion Sports | 33 |
| 3 | James Walshaw | Emley | 31 |
| 4 | Nathan Keightley | Penistone Church | 29 |
| 5 | Thomas Waudby | Barton Town | 27 |
| 5 | Patrick Sykes | Campion | 27 |
| 7 | Antony Brown | Penistone Church | 26 |
| 7 | Kayle Price | Silsden | 26 |
| 9 | Oliver Norman | Tadcaster Albion | 25 |

== Division One ==
Northern Counties East Football League Division One
- Season: 2023–24
- Champions: Parkgate
- Promoted: Parkgate; Beverley Town; Shirebrook Town
- Relegated: Ollerton Town
- Matches: 506
- Goals: 1,969 (3.89 per match)
- Biggest home win: Wakefield 11–0 Ollerton Town (14 October 2023); Dronfield Town 11–0 Swallownest (21 October 2023)
- Biggest away win: Ollerton Town 0–11 Selby Town (13 April 2024)
- Highest scoring: Wakefield 11–0 Ollerton Town (14 October 2023); Dronfield Town 11–0 Swallownest (21 October 2023); Ollerton Town 0–11 Selby Town (13 April 2024)
- Longest winning run: Parkgate/Wakefield (6 games)
- Longest unbeaten run: Parkgate (8 games)
- Longest losing run: Ollerton Town (37 games)
- Highest attendance: 1247 (Retford 1–4 Retford United, 26 December 2023)
- Lowest attendance: 35 (Nostell Miners Welfare 1–5 Louth Town, 9 March 2024; Clay Cross Town 4–2 Glasshoughton Welfare, 23 March 2024)
- Average attendance: 181

Division One featured 18 clubs which competed in the previous season, along with five new clubs:

- Clay Cross Town, promoted from Central Midlands League Premier Division South
- Louth Town, promoted from the Lincolnshire League
- Retford United, promoted from the Central Midlands League Premier Division North
- Wombwell Town, promoted from the Sheffield & Hallamshire County Senior League
- Yorkshire Amateur, relegated from the Premier Division

=== League table ===
| Pos | Team | Pld | W | D | L | GF | GA | GD | Pts | Promotion, qualification or relegation |
|---|---|---|---|---|---|---|---|---|---|---|
| 1 | Parkgate (C, P) | 44 | 34 | 5 | 5 | 125 | 41 | +84 | 107 | Promotion to the Premier Division |
| 2 | Beverley Town (O, P) | 44 | 32 | 7 | 5 | 132 | 49 | +83 | 103 | Qualification for the play-offs |
| 3 | Shirebrook Town (P) | 44 | 31 | 7 | 6 | 114 | 45 | +69 | 100 | Qualification for the play-offs, then promotion to the United Counties League |
| 4 | Wakefield | 44 | 30 | 7 | 7 | 134 | 45 | +89 | 97 | Qualification for the play-offs |
| 5 | Retford United | 44 | 28 | 9 | 7 | 121 | 47 | +74 | 93 | Qualification for the play-offs, then transfer to the United Counties League |
| 6 | Wombwell Town | 44 | 28 | 5 | 11 | 108 | 49 | +59 | 89 | |
| 7 | Horbury Town | 44 | 25 | 8 | 11 | 119 | 66 | +53 | 83 | |
| 8 | Brigg Town | 44 | 22 | 6 | 16 | 89 | 84 | +5 | 72 | |
| 9 | Staveley Miners Welfare | 44 | 19 | 9 | 16 | 84 | 62 | +22 | 66 | Transfer to the United Counties League |
| 10 | Dronfield Town | 44 | 19 | 7 | 18 | 90 | 78 | +12 | 64 | |
| 11 | Harrogate Railway Athletic | 44 | 18 | 10 | 16 | 83 | 76 | +7 | 64 | |
| 12 | Retford | 44 | 18 | 8 | 18 | 85 | 87 | −2 | 62 | Transfer to the United Counties League |
| 13 | Louth Town | 44 | 18 | 7 | 19 | 76 | 72 | +4 | 61 | |
| 14 | Selby Town | 44 | 18 | 5 | 21 | 96 | 89 | +7 | 59 | |
| 15 | Worsbrough Bridge Athletic | 44 | 16 | 5 | 23 | 67 | 77 | −10 | 53 | |
| 16 | Clay Cross Town | 44 | 14 | 6 | 24 | 61 | 89 | −28 | 48 | Transfer to the United Counties League |
| 17 | Nostell Miners Welfare | 44 | 14 | 5 | 25 | 79 | 92 | −13 | 47 | |
| 18 | Athersley Recreation | 44 | 13 | 5 | 26 | 61 | 109 | −48 | 44 | |
| 19 | Armthorpe Welfare | 44 | 12 | 5 | 27 | 68 | 120 | −52 | 41 | |
| 20 | Glasshoughton Welfare | 44 | 10 | 5 | 29 | 61 | 108 | −47 | 35 | |
| 21 | Yorkshire Amateur | 44 | 10 | 8 | 26 | 49 | 121 | −72 | 35 (Note: Yorkshire Amateur were deducted three points for fielding an ineligible player.) | |
| 22 | Swallownest | 44 | 4 | 4 | 36 | 39 | 157 | −118 | 16 | |
| 23 | Ollerton Town (R) | 44 | 1 | 1 | 42 | 28 | 206 | −178 | 4 | Relegation to the Central Midlands Alliance League |

Source: Northern Counties East Football League
Rules for classification: 1) points; 2) goal difference; 3) number of goals scored; 4) number of matches won; 5) head-to-head results
(C) Champions; (O) Play-off winners; (P) Promoted; (R) Relegated

=== Play-offs ===
Semi-finals
2 | Beverley Town | 2
5 | Retford United | 1
3 | Shirebrook Town | 4
4 | Wakefield | 0

Final
2 | Beverley Town | 1 (4)
3 | Shirebrook Town | 1 (2)

==== Semifinals ====
| 4 May | Beverley Town | 2–1 | Retford United | Winterton |
| | Tait 45'; Hinchcliffe 85' | Report | O'Connor 39' | Stadium: West Street; Attendance: 540 |

| 4 May | Shirebrook Town | 4–0 | Wakefield | Rawmarsh |
| | Watson 14', 25', 34' (pen.); Clayton 60' | Report | | Stadium: Roundwood Sports Complex; Attendance: 507 |

==== Final ====
| 11 May | Beverley Town | 1–1 (a.e.t.) (4–2 p) | Shirebrook Town | Beverley |
| 15:00 | Hinchliffe 25' | Report | McGowan 60' | Stadium: Norwood Recreation Ground; Attendance: 1,525 |

Location of the clubs in the 2023–24 NCEL Division One on a map of Yorkshire and the Humber
Location of the clubs in the 2023–24 NCEL Division One on a map of the East Midlands

| Club | Stadium | Capacity |
|---|---|---|
| Armthorpe Welfare | Welfare Ground | 2,500 |
| Athersley Recreation | Sheerien Park | 2,000 |
| Beverley Town | Norwood Recreation Ground | |
| Brigg Town | The Hawthorns | 2,500 |
| Clay Cross Town | Mill Lane | |
| Dronfield Town | Stonelow Ground | 500 |
| Glasshoughton Welfare | Glasshoughton Centre | 2,000 |
| Harrogate Railway Athletic | Station View | 3,500 |
| Horbury Town | Slazengers Sports Complex | 300 |
| Louth Town | Marshlands | |
| Nostell Miners Welfare | The Welfare Ground | 1,500 |
| Ollerton Town | Walesby Lane Sports Ground | |
| Parkgate | Roundwood Sports Complex | 1,000 |
| Retford | The Rail | 1,000 |
| Retford United | Cannon Park | 2,000 |
| Selby Town | Richard Street | 5,000 |
| Shirebrook Town | Langwith Road | 2,000 |
| Staveley Miners Welfare | Inkersall Road | 5,000 |
| Swallownest | Miners Welfare Ground | 500 |
| Wakefield | Belle Vue | 9,333 |
| Wombwell Town | Recreation Ground | 2,000 |
| Worsbrough Bridge Athletic | Park Road | 2,000 |
| Yorkshire Amateur | Bracken Edge | 1,550 |

=== Top goalscorers ===
(all competitions)

| Rank | Player | Club | Goals |
|---|---|---|---|
| 1 | James Cusworth | Horbury Town | 49 |
| 2 | Kieren Watson | Shirebrook Town | 40 |
| 3 | Ross Duggan | Parkgate | 39 |
| 4 | Joe McFadyen | Beverley Town | 33 |
| 5 | Marcus Day | Shirebrook Town | 31 |
| 6 | Max Rhodes | Dronfield Town | 30 |
| 7 | Liam Owen | Retford United | 29 |

== League Cup ==
2023–24 Northern Counties East Football League League Cup
Tournament details
- Country: England
- Teams: 42

Final positions
- Champions: Parkgate
- Runners-up: Emley

Tournament statistics
- Matches played: 42

The 2023–24 Northern Counties East Football League League Cup was the 42nd season of the league cup competition of the Northern Counties East Football League. The final was between the 2 divisional winners on Wednesday 8 May 2024, 7:45pm at Glanford Park, Scunthorpe.

Quarter-finals

| Tie | Home team | Score | Away team | Att. |
|---|---|---|---|---|
Tuesday 26 March 2024
| 1 | Frickley Athletic | 2-2 (2-4 p) | Campion | 168 |
Wednesday 27 March 2024
| 2 | Handsworth | 1-1 (3-5 p) | Rossington Main | 143 |
Saturday 13 April 2024
| 3 | Emley | 3-0 | Bottesford Town | 412 |
Saturday 27 April 2024
| 4 | Parkgate | 2-1 | Silsden | 176 |

Semi-finals

| Tie | Home team | Score | Away team | Att. |
|---|---|---|---|---|
Tuesday 23 April 2024
| 1 | Rossington Main | 1-2 | Emley | 283 |
Wednesday 1 May 2024
| 2 | Parkgate | 2-0 | Campion | 215 |

Final

| Tie | Home team | Score | Away team | Att. | Venue |
|---|---|---|---|---|---|
Wednesday 8 May 2024
| 1 | Emley | 0-3 | Parkgate | 667 | Glanford Park, Scunthorpe |
