= 2022–23 Northern Counties East Football League =

The 2022–23 season was the 41st in the history of the Northern Counties East Football League, a football competition in England.

The allocations for the league this season were announced by The Football Association (The FA) on 12 May 2022.

== Premier Division ==
Northern Counties East Football League Premier Division
- Season: 2022–23
- Champions: North Ferriby
- Promoted: North Ferriby; Winterton Rangers
- Relegated: Yorkshire Amateur
- Matches: 380
- Goals: 1,275 (3.36 per match)

The Premier Division featured 15 clubs which competed in the previous season, along with five new clubs.

- Relegated from Northern Premier League:
  - Frickley Athletic
  - Yorkshire Amateur
- Promoted from Division One:
  - Hallam
  - North Ferriby
- Plus:
  - Golcar United, promoted from North West Counties League

=== League table ===
Pos	Team	Pld	W	D	L	GF	GA	GD	Pts	Promotion, qualification or relegation
1	North Ferriby	38	31	2	5	93	38	+55	95	Promoted to the Northern Premier League
2	Winterton Rangers	38	25	6	7	86	46	+40	81	Qualified for an inter-step play-off, then promoted to the Northern Premier League
3	Emley	38	22	11	5	86	43	+43	77	
4	Garforth Town	38	20	10	8	83	47	+36	70	
5	Penistone Church	38	22	2	14	70	51	+19	68	
6	Hallam	38	21	4	13	75	54	+21	67	
7	Barton Town	38	18	10	10	65	44	+21	64	
8	Hemsworth Miners Welfare	38	16	7	15	68	60	+8	55	Demoted to the Sheffield & Hallamshire County League
9	Golcar United	38	15	9	14	72	59	+13	54	
10	Knaresborough Town	38	16	5	17	58	60	−2	53	
11	Silsden	38	15	6	17	59	63	−4	51	
12	Albion Sports	38	14	9	15	49	53	−4	51	
13	Maltby Main	38	12	12	14	59	74	−15	48	
14	Thackley	38	13	7	18	72	76	−4	46	
15	Eccleshill United	38	11	10	17	58	69	−11	43	
16	Handsworth	38	12	6	20	60	73	−13	42	
17	Frickley Athletic	38	9	9	20	51	71	−20	36	
18	Bottesford Town	38	7	8	23	48	85	−37	29	
19	Goole	38	7	4	27	30	96	−66	25	Reprieved from relegation
20	Yorkshire Amateur	38	4	3	31	33	113	−80	15	Relegated to Division One

Source: Northern Counties East Football League
Rules for classification: 1) points; 2) goal difference; 3) number of goals scored; 4) number of matches won; 5) head-to-head results

=== Inter-step play-off ===
29 April 2023	Coggeshall Town	1–2	Winterton Rangers	Coggeshall
15:00	Kithambo 90' (pen.)		Walker 79', 81'	Stadium: West Street; Attendance: 206

=== Stadia and locations ===
Location of the Premier Division clubs

Club	Stadium	Capacity
Albion Sports	Throstle Nest (Note: home of Farsley Celtic (groundshare))	3,500
Barton Town	Euronics Ground	3,000
Bottesford Town	Birch Park	1,000
Eccleshill United	Kings Way	2,225
Emley	Welfare Ground	2,000
Frickley Athletic	Westfield Lane	2,087
Garforth Town	Wheatley Park	3,000
Golcar United	Longfield Avenue	1,200
Goole	Victoria Pleasure Grounds	3,000
Hallam	Sandygate Road	1,000
Handsworth	Oliver's Mount	2,500
Hemsworth Miners Welfare	Fitzwilliam Stadium	2,000
Knaresborough Town	Manse Lane	1,000
Maltby Main	Muglet Lane	2,000
North Ferriby	The Dransfield Stadium	3,000
Penistone Church	Church View Road	1,000
Silsden	Keighley Road Stadium	1,500
Thackley	Dennyfield	3,000
Winterton Rangers	West Street Stadium	
Yorkshire Amateur	Bracken Edge	1,550

== Division One ==
Northern Counties East Football League Division One
- Season: 2022–23
- Champions: Campion
- Promoted: Campion; Rossington Main
- Matches: 380
- Goals: 1,406 (3.7 per match)

Division One featured 18 clubs which competed in the previous season, along with five new clubs:

- Athersley Recreation, relegated from the Premier Division
- Beverley Town, promoted from the Humber Premier League
- Campion, transferred from the North West Counties League
- Horbury Town, promoted from the West Yorkshire Association League
- Staveley Miners Welfare, demoted from the Premier Division
- Wakefield, promoted from Sheffield & Hallamshire County Senior League

Staveley Miners Welfare were not eligible for promotion after taking voluntary demotion from the Premier Division the previous season.

=== League table ===
Pos	Team	Pld	W	D	L	GF	GA	GD	Pts	Promotion, qualification or relegation
1	Campion	38	32	2	4	136	34	+102	98	Promoted to the Premier Division
2	Harrogate Railway Athletic	38	26	8	4	82	31	+51	86	Qualified for the play-offs
3	Rossington Main	38	26	6	6	105	48	+57	84	Qualified for the play-offs, then promoted to the Premier Division
4	Wakefield	38	22	4	12	91	57	+34	70	Qualified for the play-offs
5	Staveley Miners Welfare	38	19	6	13	82	60	+22	63	
6	Horbury Town	38	19	3	16	92	64	+28	60	Qualified for the play-offs
7	Retford	38	17	8	13	67	64	+3	59	
8	Armthorpe Welfare	38	19	1	18	68	73	−5	58	
9	Brigg Town	38	15	10	13	69	61	+8	55	
10	Selby Town	38	16	4	18	69	78	−9	52	
11	Beverley Town	38	14	9	15	76	77	−1	51	
12	Nostell Miners Welfare	38	13	5	20	65	79	−14	44	
13	Ollerton Town	38	13	2	23	46	118	−72	41	
14	Parkgate	38	13	1	24	68	83	−15	40	
15	Worsbrough Bridge Athletic	38	10	10	18	60	79	−19	40	
16	Dronfield Town	38	12	4	22	50	75	−25	40	
17	Glasshoughton Welfare	38	11	7	20	46	77	−31	40	
18	Shirebrook Town	38	9	9	20	45	77	−32	36	
19	Swallownest	38	10	6	22	44	79	−35	36	
20	Athersley Recreation	38	7	9	22	45	92	−47	30	Reprieved from relegation

Source: Northern Counties East Football League
Rules for classification: 1) points; 2) goal difference; 3) number of goals scored; 4) number of matches won; 5) head-to-head results

=== Play-offs ===
Semi-finals
2	Harrogate Railway Athletic	0
6	Horbury Town	1
3	Rossington Main	1
4	Wakefield	0

Final
6	Horbury Town	1
3	Rossington Main	3

==== Semifinals ====
15 April 2023	Harrogate Railway Athletic	0–1	Horbury Town	Harrogate
		Report	G. Bojang 19'	Stadium: Station View; Attendance: 453

15 April 2023	Rossington Main	1–0	Wakefield	Rossington
	Young 69'	Report		Stadium: Oxford Street; Attendance: 826

==== Final ====
22 April 2023	Rossington Main	3–1	Horbury Town	Rossington
	Hannah 14' (pen.); Grayson 40', 70'	Report	L. Bojang 64'	Stadium: Oxford Street; Attendance: 1,164

=== Stadia and locations ===
Location of Division One clubs

Club	Stadium	Capacity
Armthorpe Welfare	Welfare Ground	2,500
Athersley Recreation	Sheerien Park	2,000
Beverley Town	Norwood Recreation Ground	
Brigg Town	The Hawthorns	2,500
Campion	Scotchman Road	
Dronfield Town	Stonelow Ground	500
Glasshoughton Welfare	Glasshoughton Centre	2,000
Harrogate Railway Athletic	Station View	3,500
Horbury Town	Slazengers Sports Complex	300
Nostell Miners Welfare	The Welfare Ground	1,500
Ollerton Town	Walesby Lone Sports Ground	
Parkgate	Roundwood Sports Complex	1,000
Retford	The Rail	1,000
Rossington Main	Welfare Ground	2,000
Selby Town	Richard Street	5,000
Shirebrook Town	Langwith Road	2,000
Staveley Miners Welfare	Inkersall Road	5,000
Swallownest	Miners Welfare Ground	
Wakefield	Millennium Stadium	7,000
Worsbrough Bridge Athletic	Park Road	2,000

== League Cup ==
2022–23 Northern Counties East Football League League Cup
Tournament details
- Country: England
- Teams: 42

Final positions
- Champions: Winterton Rangers
- Runners-up: Golcar United

The 2022–23 Northern Counties East Football League League Cup was the 41st season of the league cup competition of the Northern Counties East Football League, Winterton Rangers beat Golcar United in the final at Doncaster.

Quarter-finals

Tie	Home team	Score	Away team	Att.
Wednesday 8 February 2023
1	Winterton Rangers	1-0	Albion Sports	128
2	Maltby Main	0-0 (3-4 p)	Golcar United	94
Wednesday 1 March 2023
3	Handsworth	0-0 (4-3 p)	Garforth Town	73
Tuesday 7 March 2023
4	Emley	3-2	Thackley	178

Semi-finals

Tie	Home team	Score	Away team	Att.
Friday 21 April 2023
1	Golcar United	0-0 (13-12 p)	Emley	1,320*
2	Handsworth	3-3 (3-4 p)	Winterton Rangers	227

- = 1,320 set a new record attendance for Golcar Utd.

Final

Tie	Home team	Score	Away team	Att.	Venue
Tuesday 2 May 2023
1	Golcar United	1-2	Winterton Rangers	810	Eco-Power Stadium, Doncaster
