= 2017–18 Northern Counties East Football League =

The 2017–18 Northern Counties East Football League season was the 36th in the history of Northern Counties East Football League, a football competition in England.

== Premier Division ==
Northern Counties East Football League Premier Division
- Champions: Pontefract Collieries
- Promoted: Pontefract Collieries; Pickering Town; AFC Mansfield
- Relegated: Rainworth Miners Welfare; Harrogate Railway Athletic; Parkgate; Clipstone
- Matches: 462
- Goals: 1,818 (3.94 per match)
- Top goalscorer: Ryan Blott, Pickering Town (45)
- Biggest home win: AFC Mansfield 9 – 0 Clipstone
- Biggest away win: Thackley 0 – 8 Pontefract Collieries
- Highest scoring: Clipstone 3 – 10 Maltby Main
- Highest attendance: 459 – Handsworth Parramore 2 – 1 Worksop Town
- Lowest attendance: 24 – Hall Road Rangers 1 – 3 Albion Sports
- Average attendance: 120

The Premier Division featured 19 clubs which competed in the previous season, along with three new clubs, promoted from Division One:

- Hall Road Rangers
- Penistone Church
- Pontefract Collieries

=== League table ===
Pos	Team	Pld	W	D	L	GF	GA	GD	Pts	Promotion or relegation
1	Pontefract Collieries	42	33	3	6	134	38	+96	102	Promoted to the Northern Premier League Division One East
2	Pickering Town	42	29	9	4	127	52	+75	96	Promoted to the Northern Premier League Division One East
3	AFC Mansfield	42	29	9	4	110	43	+67	96	Promoted to the Northern Premier League Division One East
4	Handsworth Parramore	42	27	4	11	99	56	+43	85	
5	Maltby Main	42	22	9	11	88	57	+31	75	
6	Hemsworth Miners Welfare	42	22	6	14	104	77	+27	72	
7	Penistone Church	42	20	12	10	93	66	+27	72	
8	Bottesford Town	42	22	3	17	93	84	+9	69	
9	Bridlington Town	42	18	10	14	81	60	+21	64	
10	Rainworth Miners Welfare	42	18	9	15	71	76	−5	63	Voluntary demoted to East Midlands Counties League
11	Liversedge	42	15	12	15	96	93	+3	57	
12	Barton Town	42	17	5	20	64	76	−12	55 (Note: Barton Town Old Boys were deducted 1 point for fielding ineligible players.)	
13	Garforth Town	42	14	10	18	72	101	−29	52	
14	Albion Sports	42	14	6	22	76	84	−8	48	
15	Thackley	42	13	8	21	76	85	−9	47	
16	Staveley Miners Welfare	42	13	8	21	52	83	−31	47	
17	Athersley Recreation	42	13	7	22	66	89	−23	46	
18	Worksop Town	42	12	10	20	68	94	−26	46	
19	Hall Road Rangers	42	16	7	19	83	84	−1	43 (Note: Hall Road Rangers were deducted 12 points for fielding ineligible players.)	
20	Harrogate Railway Athletic	42	9	4	29	70	132	−62	31	Reprieved from relegation
21	Parkgate	42	7	5	30	58	116	−58	26	Relegated to Division One
22	Clipstone	42	0	2	40	37	172	−135	2	Relegated to the East Midlands Counties League

Source: NCEFL Tables
Rules for classification: 1) Points; 2) Goal difference; 3) Number of goals scored; 4) Number of matches won; 5) Head-to-head results

=== Stadia and locations ===
Location of the clubs in the 2017–18
NCEL Premier Division on a map of
Yorkshire and the Humber

Club	Stadium
Albion Sports	Throstle Nest (Note: home of Farsley Celtic (groundshare))
Athersley Recreation	Sheerien Park
Barton Town	The Easy Buy Stadium
Bottesford Town	Birkdale Stadium
Bridlington Town	Neil Hudgell Solicitors Stadium
Clipstone	Worksop Van Hire Stadium
Garforth Town	The Supply Chain Network Community Stadium
Hall Road Rangers	Haworth Park
Handsworth Parramore	Windsor Food Service Stadium
Harrogate Railway Athletic	Station View
Hemsworth Miners Welfare	The Yorkshire NuBuilds Stadium
Liversedge	Clayborn Ground
Maltby Main	Muglet Lane
AFC Mansfield	Forest Town Stadium
Parkgate	Roundwood Sports Complex
Penistone Church	The DSM Memorial Ground
Pickering Town	Recreation Club
Pontefract Collieries	The Harratts Nissan Stadium
Rainworth Miners Welfare	Kirklingto Road
Staveley Miners Welfare	Inkersall Road
Thackley	Dennyfield
Worksop Town	Windsor Food Service Stadium (Note: home of Handsworth Parramore (groundshare))

== Division One ==
Northern Counties East Football League Division One
- Champions: Knaresborough Town
- Promoted: Knaresborough Town; Yorkshire Amateur; Eccleshill United
- Relegated: Brigg Town; Retford United
- Matches: 462
- Goals: 1,713 (3.71 per match)
- Top goalscorer: Ashley Flynn, Yorkshire Amateur (45)
- Biggest home win: Campion 11 – 1 FC Bolsover
- Biggest away win: AFC Emley 1 – 8 Yorkshire Amateur
- Highest scoring: Campion 11 – 1 FC Bolsover
- Highest attendance: 466 – Hallam 5 – 1 Brigg Town
- Lowest attendance: 21 – FC Bolsover 1 – 3 Eccleshill United
- Average attendance: 97

Division One featured 17 clubs which competed in the previous season, along with five new clubs.

- Clubs relegated from the Premier Division:
  - Armthorpe Welfare
  - Retford United
- Plus:
  - FC Bolsover, promoted from the Central Midlands League
  - East Yorkshire Carnegie, promoted from the Humber Premier League
  - Swallownest, promoted from the Sheffield & Hallamshire County Senior League

=== League table ===
Pos	Team	Pld	W	D	L	GF	GA	GD	Pts	Promotion, qualification or relegation
1	Knaresborough Town	42	31	7	4	91	30	+61	100	Promoted to the Premier Division
2	Yorkshire Amateur	42	27	7	8	132	55	+77	88	Promoted to the Premier Division
3	Grimsby Borough	42	26	7	9	113	56	+57	85	Qualified for the play-offs
4	Eccleshill United	42	26	7	9	109	61	+48	85	Qualified for the play-offs, then promoted to the Premier Division
5	Shirebrook Town	42	25	6	11	91	60	+31	81	Qualified for the play-offs
6	Glasshoughton Welfare	42	23	8	11	85	54	+31	77	Qualified for the play-offs
7	Selby Town	42	23	6	13	105	71	+34	75	
8	Hallam	42	21	10	11	100	58	+42	73	
9	Campion	42	22	7	13	95	65	+30	73	
10	Winterton Rangers	42	17	10	15	66	64	+2	61	
11	Swallownest	42	17	7	18	65	76	−11	58	
12	AFC Emley	42	17	6	19	73	78	−5	57	
13	Rossington Main	42	14	11	17	71	85	−14	53	
14	Dronfield Town	42	16	4	22	62	75	−13	52	
15	Ollerton Town	42	13	8	21	66	90	−24	47	
16	Armthorpe Welfare	42	13	7	22	72	97	−25	46	
17	Nostell Miners Welfare	42	12	4	26	61	97	−36	40	
18	East Yorkshire Carnegie	42	10	4	28	64	98	−34	34	
19	Worsbrough Bridge Athletic	42	7	12	23	51	99	−48	33	
20	FC Bolsover	42	11	3	28	48	124	−76	30 (Note: FC Bolsover were deducted six points on 12 November for a fielding a suspended player in two matches on 23 and 26 August.)	
21	Brigg Town	42	6	11	25	51	105	−54	29	Relegated to the Lincolnshire League
22	Retford United	42	6	6	30	42	115	−73	24	Relegated to the Central Midlands League

Source: NCEFL Tables
Rules for classification: 1) Points; 2) Goal difference; 3) Number of goals scored; 4) Number of matches won; 5) Head-to-head results

==== Play-offs ====
Semi-finals
4	Eccleshill United	4
5	Shirebrook Town	2
3	Grimsby Borough	3
6	Glasshoughton Welfare	0

Final
4	Eccleshill United	3
3	Grimsby Borough	2

Semi-finals

9 May 2018	Eccleshill United	4–2 (a.e.t.)	Shirebrook Town	Bradford
	Brown 25', 117'; Lever 89'; Rose 103'	Report	Williams 65'; Naylor 70'	Stadium: Mitton Group Stadium; Attendance: 219

9 May 2018	Grimsby Borough	3–0	Glasshoughton Welfare	Grimsby
	Mascall 5', 24'; Lovett 84'	Report		Stadium: Bradley Community Stadium; Attendance: 143

Final

12 May 2018	Grimsby Borough	2–3 (a.e.t.)	Eccleshill United	Grimsby
15:00	Lovett 34'; Debnam 59'	Report	Brown 23'; Cooper 90' (pen.); Harrop 105'	Stadium: Bradley Community Stadium; Attendance: 190

=== Stadia and locations ===
Location of the clubs in the 2017–18
NCEL Division One on a map of
Yorkshire and the Humber

Club	Stadium
Armthorpe Welfare	Welfare Ground
FC Bolsover	Langwith Road (Note: home of Shirebrook Town (groundshare))
Brigg Town	The Hawthorns
Campion	The Sportsbulk.co.uk Stadium
Dronfield Town	The H.E. Barnes Stadium
East Yorkshire Carnegie	Dene Park
Eccleshill United	Mitton Group Stadium
AFC Emley	The Fantastic Media Welfare Ground
Glasshoughton Welfare	TJs Travel Arena
Grimsby Borough	Bradley Community Stadium
Hallam	Sandygate Road
Knaresborough Town	Manse Lane
Nostell Miners Welfare	The Welfare Ground
Ollerton Town	Walesby Lane
Retford United	Jones & Co Stadium
Rossington Main	Welfare Ground
Selby Town	Fairfax Plant Hire Stadium
Shirebrook Town	Langwith Road
Swallownest	Miners Welfare Ground
Winterton Rangers	West Street
Worsbrough Bridge Athletic	Park Road
Yorkshire Amateur	Bracken Edge

== League Cup ==
2017–18 Northern Counties East Football League League Cup
Tournament details
- Country: England

Final positions
- Champions: None (cup withdrawn)

The 2017–18 Northern Counties East Football League League Cup was the 36th season of the league cup competition of the Northern Counties East Football League.

=== First round ===
4 October 2017	Ollerton Town	2–0	Retford United	Walesby Lane
				Attendance: 94

17 October 2017	Armthorpe Welfare	0–2	Swallownest	Welfare Ground
				Attendance: 55

17 October 2017	Yorkshire Amateur	6–1	Brigg Town	Bracken Edge
				Attendance: 55

18 October 2017	FC Bolsover	0–1	Knaresborough Town	Langwith Road
				Attendance: 33

25 October 2017	AFC Emley	0–2	Eccleshill United	Fantastic Media Welfare Stadium
				Attendance: 130

6 December 2017	Campion	6–0	Worsbrough Bridge Athletic	The Sportsbulk.co.uk Stadium
				Attendance: 26

=== Second round ===
21 November 2017	Glasshoughton Welfare	4–0	Nostell Miners Welfare	TJs Travel Arena
				Attendance: 70

21 November 2017	Hemsworth Miners Welfare	4–2	Hallam	The Yorkshire NuBuilds Stadium
				Attendance: 74

22 November 2017	Winterton Rangers	0–4	Knaresborough Town	West Street
				Attendance: 62

29 November 2017	Albion Sports	1–2	Pontefract Collieries	Throstle Nest
				Attendance: 49

9 January 2018	Thackley	0–2	Swallownest	Dennyfield
				Attendance: 53

7 February 2018	Athersley Recreation	3–1	Eccleshill United	Sheerien Park
				Attendance: 60

=== Third round ===
16 January 2018	AFC Mansfield	2–0	Barton Town	Forest Town Stadium
				Attendance: 48

17 January 2018	Bottesford Town	0–3	Campion	Birkdale Stadium
				Attendance: 41

17 January 2018	Ollerton Town	4–3 (a.e.t.)	Clipstone	Walesby Lane
				Attendance: 131

23 January 2018	Hemsworth Miners Welfare	2–1	Penistone Church	The Yorkshire NuBuilds Stadium
				Attendance: 98

23 January 2018	Swallownest	0–4	Dronfield Town	Miners Welfare Ground
				Attendance: 48

10 February 2018	Liversedge	4–3	Hall Road Rangers	Clayborn Ground
				Attendance: 62

13 February 2018	Knaresborough Town	1–1 (a.e.t.) (6–5 p)	Maltby Main	Manse Lane
				Attendance: 72

13 February 2018	Pontefract Collieries	4–3	Pickering Town	Harratts Nissan Stadium
				Attendance: 64

20 February 2018	Rossington Main	0–2	Rainworth Miners Welfare	Welfare Ground
				Attendance: 48

20 February 2018	Yorkshire Amateur	4–0	Garforth Town	Bracken Edge
				Attendance: 63

21 February 2018	Harrogate Railway Athletic	0–1	Staveley Miners Welfare	Station View
				Attendance: 25

21 February 2018	Parkgate	2–0	Glasshoughton Welfare	Roundwood Sports Ground
				Attendance: 69

21 February 2018	Worksop Town	1–3	Bridlington Town	Windsor Food Service Stadium
				Attendance: 283

26 March 2018	Athersley Recreation	0–4	Handsworth Parramore	Sheerien Park
				Attendance: 76

29 March 2018	Selby Town	0–6	Shirebrook Town	Fairfax Plant Hire Stadium
				Attendance: 110

14 April 2018	East Yorkshire Carnegie	0–2	Grimsby Borough	Dene Park
				Attendance: 50

=== Fourth round ===
13 March 2018	AFC Mansfield	2–1 (a.e.t.)	Staveley Miners Welfare	Forest Town Stadium
				Attendance: 60

20 March 2018	Yorkshire Amateur	1–4	Hemsworth Miners Welfare	Bracken Edge
				Attendance: 55

21 March 2018	Parkgate	0–3	Rainworth Miners Welfare	Roundwood Sports Complex
				Attendance: 70

26 March 2018	Dronfield Town	2–3	Liversedge	The H.E. Barnes Stadium
				Attendance: 45

5 April 2018	Bridlington Town	1–0	Campion	Neil Hudgells Solicitors Stadium
				Attendance: 108

5 April 2018	Handsworth Parramore	4–2	Knaresborough Town	Windsor Food Service Stadium
				Attendance: 89

9 April 2018	Shirebrook Town	5–1	Pontefract Collieries	Langwith Road
				Attendance: 112

25 April 2018	Ollerton Town	4–2 (a.e.t.)	Grimsby Borough	Walesby Lane
				Attendance: 75

=== Quarter-finals ===
19 April 2018	Shirebrook Town	2–3	Bridlington Town	Langwith Road
				Attendance: 117

23 April 2018	Hemsworth Miners Welfare	1–4	AFC Mansfield	The Yorkshire NuBuilds Stadium
				Attendance: 96

30 April 2018	Rainworth Miners Welfare	2–3	Liversedge	Kirklington Road
				Attendance: 75

3 May 2018	Handsworth Parramore	2–1	Ollerton Town	Windsor Food Service Stadium
				Attendance: 150

=== Semi-finals ===
8 May 2018	Liversedge	5–2	Handsworth Parramore	Clayborn Ground
	Daniel Walker 10'; Tom Brook 35'; Marc Lumb 40'; Joseph Walton 62'; Daniel Farrar 82'		Oscar Radford 20'; William Eades 81'	Attendance: 104

9 May 2018	Bridlington Town	2–4	AFC Mansfield	Neil Hudgells Solicitors Stadium
				Attendance: 164

=== Final ===
21 May 2018	AFC Mansfield	Cancelled	Liversedge	Bramall Lane
Note: Final abandoned; Liversedge expelled for playing an ineligible player
