= 2020–21 Northern Counties East Football League =

The 2020–21 Northern Counties East Football League season was the 39th in the history of Northern Counties East Football League, a football competition in England.

Due to the restrictions on clubs' ability to play matches in the COVID-19 lockdowns, competitions at Steps 3–6 were curtailed on 24 February 2021.

== Promotions and restructuring ==
The scheduled restructuring of non-League football took place at the end of the season, with a new division added to the Northern Premier League at Step 4 for 2021–22. Promotions from Steps 5 to 4 and 6 to 5 were based on points per game across all matches over the two cancelled seasons (2019-20 and 2020-21), while teams were promoted to Step 6 on the basis of a subjective application process. These resulted in three Northern Counties East teams joining the new Northern Premier Midlands division.

== Premier Division ==
Northern Counties East Football League Premier Division
- Season: 2019–20
- Promoted: Bridlington Town; Liversedge; Yorkshire Amateur
- Matches: 263
- Goals: 976 (3.71 per match)

The Premier Division consisted of 20 clubs. The constitution of the division remained unchanged from the unfinished 2019–20 season.

=== League table ===
Pos	Team	Pld	W	D	L	GF	GA	GD	Pts	Promotion
1	Yorkshire Amateur	11	9	2	0	36	9	+27	29	Promoted to the Northern Premier League Division One East (Note: Promoted based on points per game calculations from 2019–20 and 2020–21 seasons combined.)
2	Bridlington Town	9	7	0	2	39	15	+24	21	Promoted to the Northern Premier League Division One East
3	Liversedge	7	7	0	0	25	3	+22	21	Promoted to the Northern Premier League Division One East
4	Garforth Town	9	7	0	2	22	12	+10	21	
5	Maltby Main	10	5	3	2	23	17	+6	18	
6	AFC Mansfield	9	5	2	2	26	9	+17	17	
7	Handsworth	12	5	2	5	28	31	−3	17	
8	Grimsby Borough	10	5	1	4	28	22	+6	16	
9	Barton Town	11	4	2	5	16	25	−9	14	
10	Albion Sports	9	4	1	4	14	14	0	13	
11	Eccleshill United	11	4	1	6	14	18	−4	13	
12	Penistone Church	7	4	0	3	17	11	+6	12	
13	Hemsworth Miners Welfare	7	4	0	3	8	5	+3	12	
14	Goole	11	3	2	6	13	34	−21	11	
15	Silsden	10	3	1	6	16	22	−6	10	
16	Thackley	11	2	2	7	13	24	−11	8	
17	Staveley Miners Welfare	6	2	1	3	9	10	−1	7	
18	Knaresborough Town	9	2	1	6	9	18	−9	7	
19	Bottesford Town	11	1	1	9	15	39	−24	4	
20	Athersley Recreation	10	1	0	9	9	42	−33	3	

Source: Northern Counties East Football League
Rules for classification: 1) Points; 2) Goal difference; 3) Number of goals scored; 4) Number of matches won; 5) Head-to-head results

=== Stadia and locations ===
Location of the clubs in the 2020–21 NCEL Premier
Division on a map of Yorkshire and the Humber

Club	Stadium	Capacity
Albion Sports	Throstle Nest (Note: home of Farsley Celtic (groundshare))	3,500
Athersley Recreation	Sheerien Park	2,000
Barton Town	Euronics Ground	3,000
Bottesford Town	Birch Park	1,000
Bridlington Town	Queensgate	3,000
Eccleshill United	Kings Way	2,225
Garforth Town	Wheatley Park	3,000
Goole	Victoria Pleasure Grounds	3,000
Grimsby Borough	Bradley Football Centre	1,000
Handsworth	Sandy Lane	2,500
Hemsworth Miners Welfare	Fitzwilliam Stadium	2,000
Knaresborough Town	Manse Lane	1,000
Liversedge	Clayborn Ground	2,000
Maltby Main	Muglet Lane	2,000
AFC Mansfield	Forest Town Stadium	
Penistone Church	Church View Road	1,000
Silsden	Keighley Road Stadium	1,500
Staveley Miners Welfare	Inkersall Road	5,000
Thackley	Dennyfield	3,000
Yorkshire Amateur	Bracken Edge	1,550

== Division One ==
Northern Counties East Football League Division One
- Season: 2020–21
- Promoted: Brigg Town; Skegness Town; Winterton Rangers
- Matches: 257
- Goals: 936 (3.64 per match)

Division One featured 19 clubs which competed in the previous season, along with one new club:

- Emley, transferred from the North West Counties League

=== League table ===
Pos	Team	Pld	W	D	L	GF	GA	GD	Pts	Promotion or qualification
1	Emley	10	8	2	0	27	9	+18	26	Promoted to Premier Division (Note: Promoted based on points per game calculations from 2019–20 and 2020–21 seasons combined.)
2	Campion	11	8	0	3	36	19	+17	24	Transferred to the North West Counties League
3	Winterton Rangers	9	7	1	1	34	11	+23	22	Promoted to Premier Division
4	North Ferriby	10	7	1	2	20	9	+11	22	
5	Retford	13	6	3	4	29	23	+6	21	
6	Brigg Town	11	6	2	3	32	19	+13	20	
7	Rossington Main	12	5	3	4	29	24	+5	18	
8	Skegness Town	8	5	1	2	17	12	+5	16	Promoted to the United Counties League
9	Parkgate	10	5	1	4	26	28	−2	16	
10	Hall Road Rangers	10	4	2	4	17	20	−3	14	
11	Hallam	8	4	1	3	21	17	+4	13	
12	Nostell Miners Welfare	12	4	0	8	20	28	−8	12	
13	Glasshoughton Welfare	12	3	2	7	22	21	+1	11	
14	Armthorpe Welfare	12	3	2	7	21	35	−14	11	
15	Swallownest	8	3	1	4	16	17	−1	10	
16	Dronfield Town	11	3	1	7	17	28	−11	10	
17	Harrogate Railway Athletic	8	2	3	3	16	25	−9	9	
18	East Hull	10	2	1	7	10	33	−23	7	
19	Worsbrough Bridge Athletic	13	1	3	9	14	35	−21	6	
20	Selby Town	6	1	0	5	9	20	−11	3	

Source: Northern Counties East Football League
Rules for classification: 1) Points; 2) Goal difference; 3) Number of goals scored; 4) Number of matches won; 5) Head-to-head results

=== Stadia and locations ===
Location of the clubs in the 2020–21
NCEL Division One on a map of
Yorkshire and the Humber

Club	Stadium	Capacity
Armthorpe Welfare	Welfare Ground	2,500
Brigg Town	The Hawthorns	2,500
Campion	Scotchman Road	
Dronfield Town	Stonelow Ground	500
East Hull	Dene Park	2,000
Emley	Welfare Ground	2,000
Glasshoughton Welfare	Glasshoughton Centre	2,000
Hallam	Sandygate Road	1,000
Hall Road Rangers	Haworth Park	1,200
Harrogate Railway Athletic	Station View	3,500
North Ferriby	The Dransfield Stadium	3,000
Nostell Miners Welfare	The Welfare Ground	1,500
Parkgate	Roundwood Sports Complex	1,000
Retford	The Rail	1,000
Rossington Main	Welfare Ground	2,000
Selby Town	Richard Street	5,000
Skegness Town	Vertigo Stadium	
Swallownest	Miners Welfare Ground	
Winterton Rangers	West Street	3,000
Worsbrough Bridge Athletic	Park Road	2,000

== League Cup ==
2020–21 Northern Counties East Football League League Cup
Tournament details
- Country: England

The 2020–21 Northern Counties East Football League League Cup should have been the 37th season of the league cup competition of the Northern Counties East Football League. Due to COVID-19 pandemic-related concerns, it was not played.
