= Beverley Town F.C. =

Association football club in England

Beverley Town
- Full name: Beverley Town Football Club
- Nickname: The Beavers
- Founded: 1902; 124 years ago
- Ground: Norwood Park
- Capacity: 1,000 (106 seated)
- Chairman: Mark Smith
- Manager: Dave Ricardo
- League: Northern Premier League Division One East
- 2025–26: Northern Counties East League Premier Division, 2nd of 20 (promoted via play-offs)

Beverley Town Football Club is a football club based in Beverley, East Riding of Yorkshire, England. They are currently members of the Northern Premier League Division One East and play their home games at Norwood Park.

== History ==
=== Early years ===
Beverley Town Football Club has been in existence since 1902, when the club became registered as a member of the East Riding County League. The first recorded honours for Town, came in 1905–06 with victory in the Senior Cup which is the East Riding’s most prestigious cup tournament when they beat the Hull Botanic Swifts by a 3–0 margin in game played at Hull City’s Anlaby Road Ground. The Beavers won the same trophy again in 1912–13 when they beat the First Battalion of the East Yorkshire Regiment by the same scoreline.

The club was forced to disband in 1914, upon declaration of the First World War. The club reformed after the war ended and remained in sporadic existence until 1939, when football was once again suspended following the commencement of World War Two. Some momentum was finally gained in 1948, after a merger with local side Beverley Rangers, which saw the team moved to its current home at Norwood Park, then known as the Norwood Recreation Ground. This came after chairman Jack Gittoes persuaded his fellow cricket committee members to allow football onto the ground for the first time. In 1954, a further merger with Beverley United occurred, and the club became a highly competitive side on the East Riding County League scene for the next two decades. The highlight of which was the team winning three East Riding Stanley Wilson Cup Finals during this era.

After disagreements with the grounds committee, the club left Norwood around 1970 and a nomadic existence was to follow, with Beverley Town sides continuing to play in the East Riding County League at various venues over the ensuing years. These included the former Victoria Barracks – now a Morrisons Supermarket; the Hodgsons Recreation Ground, Longcroft School, and Orchard Park playing fields in nearby Hull.

=== Humber Premier League ===
It was not until 2000, when a Beverley Town team was formed from the former Beverley Old Grammarians side and became a founder member of the then newly formed Humber Premier League that it finally became established as a presence of note once again. Town returned to its roots at Norwood Park, and steady progress has been made since. The club lifted its first Humber Premier title in 2012–13 – under manager Dave Ricardo and coach Steve Mulligan, losing only one game in the process. A year later, Town won the Northern Counties Senior Cup in 2013–14, as they became one of only two East Riding County FA sides to have won this trophy its then forty-year history.

Beverley Town won a second Humber Premier title in 2020–21 and the following season the club were league runners-up, but gained promotion to the NCEL Division One as improvements to the Norwood ground meant it finally fulfilled league eligibility. This included the installation of a 56-seater stand named in honour of former player and local school teacher Ivan Usher. These improvements also included the reinstating of previous managerial team from 2012, when Beverley won its first Humber Premier title, including Dave Ricardo, Who had previously been managing Hull Road Rangers before taking on the Beverley job for the second time. In July 2022, Beverley announced the signing of former Sampdoria and Napoli winger, Daniele Mannini. The move came about after a chance encounter in which Mannini had met chairman Mark Smith whilst the two were walking dogs with Smith inviting him to pre-season training.

=== Northern Counties East League ===
Beverley Town made their debut in the Northern Counties East Football League in the 2022–23 season which marked the first time in the club's history that they would play in the 10th division of English football. They would finish the season in 11th place on a respectable 51 points. Beverley were also the most supported club in the league. The following season, on 11 May 2024, the club was promoted to the NCEL Premier League after a thrilling penalty shootout in a play-off final against Shirebrook Town. This came after Beverley Town accumulated 103 points during the regular season which saw them secure the league runner-up position behind Parkgate FC.

In August 2024, Beverley participated in the FA Cup for the first time in 105 years, thus setting a record for the longest period between consecutive FA Cup games. Beverley played Whitley Bay F.C. in the Extra Preliminary Round at Norwood Park on 4 August. The game would see Kai Larkin sent off in the 12th minute for handling the ball on the line and conceding a penalty. Shortly after halftime, Beverley found themselves 0–3 down but would pull the score back to 2–3, eventually losing by this score. 912 fans attended, a record for this round of the cup.

During the 2024–25 NCEL Premier Division, Beverley would finish 4th and qualify for the playoffs. This was the club's first season participating in the 9th tier of English football in their entire history. Having finished in this position, they travelled to Golcar United where a 68th minute goal from winger, Luka Suluburic would see them clinch victory 1–0 and progress to the playoff final where they would travel to Hallam F.C. During the first half of the final, Beverley took a 2–0 lead courtesy of two goals from striker McCauley Snelgrove. Hallam would then score two early goals at the start of the second half to draw level and eventually send the tie to penalties, which Hallam would win 4–3, meaning Beverley will spend at least one more season in the NCEL Premier Division.

On 6 May 2025, Beverley competed in the final of the 2024–25 NCEL League Cup, played at Glanford Park, the home of Scunthorpe United. They would go on to beat Knaresborough Town A.F.C. 3–2 and win the competition for the first time in their history.

The 2025-26 season saw Beverley carry on their recent success and finish 2nd in the league thus securing their highest ever finish in the English football pyramid, and ensuring a home playoff semi-final. The semi-final was played against Barton Town F.C. in front of a sellout crowd; strong winds made the game tough with neither team having many chances on goal and it finally being decided with a late Beverley Town penalty scored by McCauley Snelgrove to ensure a 1-0 home victory. On 18 April 2026, Beverley played in their 3rd consecutive NCEL playoff final, taking on Tadcaster Albion at Norwood in front of another sellout crowd of 1,000 spectators. Goals from Glen Sani and Luka Suluburic secured a close 2-1 victory that saw Beverley earn promotion to the Northern Premier League for the 2026-27 season, the highest league the club will ever have played in throughout their history.

== Current Squad ==
As of 19 August 2026

Note: Flags indicate national team as defined under FIFA eligibility rules; some limited exceptions apply. Players may hold more than one non-FIFA nationality.

No.	Pos.	Nation	Player
—	GK	ENG	Leigh Overton
—	DF	ENG	Bobby Attree
—	DF	ENG	Alex Knaggs
—	DF	ENG	George Palmer
—	DF	ENG	James Piercy (captain)
—	DF	ENG	Matty Plummer
—	DF	ENG	Tom Rennardson
—	DF	ENG	Paul Sherburn
—	DF	ENG	Alfie Taylor
—	DF	ENG	Ollie Wilson
—	MF	ENG	Tom Alngohuro
—	MF	ENG	Conner Harman

No.	Pos.	Nation	Player
—	MF	ENG	Kai Larkin
—	MF	ENG	Harry Lovick
—	MF	ENG	Nathan Ofori
—	MF	ENG	Joel Shortland
—	MF	ENG	Adam Stockhill
—	MF	CRO	Luka Šuluburić
—	FW	ENG	Cam Connelly
—	FW	POR	Aris Cunha
—	FW	ITA	Samuel Opoku
—	FW	ENG	Elliot Smith (on loan from Grimsby Town)
—	FW	ENG	McCauley Snelgrove

== Former Players ==
Over the years, several players who have represented Beverley Town at either junior or senior level, have gone on to play in the professional game. These include former Leeds, Tottenham, and England goalkeeper, Paul Robinson, as well as former Hull City players, John Hawley; Ray Clubley, Linton Brown, Darren France, and Gavin Kelly. The team were also trained for a period in the 1960s by Hull City players John McSeveney and Andy Davidson – who remains Hull City's record appearances holder, with 579 games for the Tigers.

== Stadium ==
Beverley play their home games at Norwood Park, also known as the Norwood Recreation Ground, which they share with Beverley Cricket Club. The western end of the football pitch is overlapped by a cricket field and so spectators are not permitted to stand at this end.

Norwood has one 56-seater stand named after the late Ivan Usher, a local schoolteacher, former player and lifelong supporter of the club. In 2023, three covered standing areas were built either side of the seated stand and running the length of the South side.

In December 2024, planning permission was approved to build a new stand on the eastern end of the pitch. The stand was opened on 22 March 2025, being unveiled by former boxer Tommy Coyle. This stand combines seating and standing with approximately 50 seats and room for 100 standing fans.

The record attendance at Norwood was set in the 2023–24 NCEL Division 1 playoff final when 1,525 spectators attended.

== Records ==
- Best FA Cup performance: Extra preliminary round, 2024–25, 2025-26
- Best FA Vase performance: 1st round, 2024–25

== Honours ==
=== Leagues ===
- Northern Counties East League Premier Division
  - Play-Off Champions 2025–26
  - Play-Off Runners-up 2024–25
- Northern Counties East League Division One
  - Play-Off Champions 2023–24
- Humber Premier League Premier Division
  - Champions 2012–13, 2013–14, 2020–21
  - Runners-up 2021–22

=== Cups ===
- Northern Counties East League League Cup
  - Champions 2024–25
