= 2024–25 Northern Counties East Football League =

Northern Counties East Football League
- Season: 2024–25

The 2024–25 Northern Counties East Football League season is the 43rd in the history of the Northern Counties East Football League, a football competition in England.

The allocations for Steps 5 and 6 this season were announced by The Football Association on 17 May 2024.

== Premier Division ==
Northern Counties East League Premier Division
- Champions: Silsden
- Promoted: Silsden; Hallam
- Relegated: Winterton Rangers; Goole
- Matches: 380
- Goals: 1,320 (3.47 per match)
- Biggest home win: Hallam 7–0 Beverley Town (15 February 2025)
- Biggest away win: Goole 0–7 Handsworth (8 March 2025)
- Highest scoring: Eccleshill United 6–5 Beverley Town (4 September 2024)
- Longest winning run: Silsden (6 games)
- Longest unbeaten run: Hallam (17 games)
- Longest losing run: Bottesford Town/Frickley Athletic (4 games)
- Highest attendance: 1,056 (Hallam 5–1 Silsden, 1 March 2025)
- Lowest attendance: 0 (Goole 3–2 Penistone Church, 24 August 2024) Behind closed doors 35 (Eccleshill United 2–5 Barton Town, 29 March 2025) With fans
- Average attendance: 179

The Premier Division consists of 20 clubs.

The following three teams left the division at the end of the 2023–24 season:

- Emley - promoted to Northern Premier League Division One East
- Garforth Town - promoted to Northern Premier League Division One East
- Maltby Main - relegated to NCEL Division One

The following three teams joined the division ahead of the 2024–25 season:

- Beverley Town - promoted from NCEL Division One
- Parkgate - promoted from NCEL Division One
- Winterton Rangers - relegated from Northern Premier League Division One East

=== League table ===
Pos	Team	Pld	W	D	L	GF	GA	GD	Pts	Promotion, qualification or relegation
1	Silsden (C, P)	38	26	8	4	86	48	+38	86	Promotion to the Northern Premier League
2	Hallam (O, P)	38	23	8	7	96	44	+52	77	Qualification for the play-offs
3	Golcar United	38	23	3	12	87	48	+39	72	Qualification for the play-offs
4	Beverley Town	38	21	5	12	79	60	+19	68	Qualification for the play-offs
5	Thackley	38	20	7	11	84	57	+27	67	Qualification for the play-offs
6	Albion Sports	38	20	8	10	77	51	+26	65 (Note: Albion Sports were deducted 3 points for fielding suspended player Thomas Porter vs. Frickley Athletic on 27 December 2024.)	
7	Handsworth	38	18	7	13	83	68	+15	61	
8	Penistone Church	38	16	8	14	75	62	+13	56	
9	Campion	38	16	5	17	63	63	0	53	
10	Pickering Town	38	16	5	17	66	68	−2	53	
11	Parkgate	38	16	4	18	55	66	−11	52	
12	Knaresborough Town	38	13	10	15	61	59	+2	49	
13	Rossington Main	38	14	7	17	68	70	−2	49	
14	Barton Town	38	13	10	15	60	67	−7	49	
15	Eccleshill United	38	12	8	18	54	68	−14	44	
16	Bottesford Town	38	13	5	20	56	80	−24	44	
17	Tadcaster Albion	38	10	7	21	54	72	−18	37	
18	Frickley Athletic	38	9	6	23	53	86	−33	33	
19	Winterton Rangers (R)	38	7	6	25	25	77	−52	27	Relegation to Division One
20	Goole (R)	38	6	9	23	38	106	−68	27	Relegation to Division One

Source: Northern Counties East Football League
Rules for classification: 1) points; 2) goal difference; 3) number of goals scored; 4) number of matches won; 5) head-to-head results
(C) Champions; (O) Play-off winners; (P) Promoted; (R) Relegated

=== Results table ===
Home \ Away	ALB	BAR	BEV	BOT	CAM	ECC	FRI	GCR	GOO	HAL	HAN	KNA	PAR	PEC	PIC	ROM	SIL	TAD	THA	WIN
Albion Sports	—	3–1	1–2	3–1	0–0	3–1	2–0	3–2	2–1	2–2	1–2	2–2	0–0	3–0	4–0	2–1	0–1	3–2	1–1	5–0
Barton Town	0–0	—	3–1	1–1	1–1	2–0	1–1	3–2	2–2	1–6	1–2	1–2	4–2	3–5	4–2	0–2	1–0	1–1	0–2	1–1
Beverley Town	3–0	2–0	—	2–1	3–0	5–2	4–0	2–1	5–0	1–0	0–4	2–1	4–1	0–4	1–0	1–1	1–1	4–2	4–0	2–1
Bottesford Town	2–1	3–1	3–2	—	0–4	3–2	3–5	1–0	3–0	1–2	2–3	3–1	2–0	1–1	3–3	2–3	2–3	5–3	2–2	1–0
Campion	1–2	0–1	1–5	3–1	—	4–0	2–1	1–2	1–0	1–2	3–1	3–1	3–4	1–3	0–3	3–1	0–1	3–2	1–5	1–2
Eccleshill United	3–4	2–5	6–5	2–1	1–1	—	2–1	2–1	6–1	0–1	1–0	1–0	1–2	1–0	2–1	2–2	1–5	4–1	1–5	0–0
Frickley Athletic	2–1	0–4	3–3	1–2	1–2	0–0	—	2–4	2–2	0–6	2–1	3–1	0–1	2–4	2–4	4–0	2–3	0–1	3–0	1–0
Golcar United	1–2	2–1	3–0	4–0	3–0	1–0	3–0	—	2–0	0–2	4–1	1–2	4–1	4–1	2–0	4–2	1–2	2–1	0–4	6–0
Goole	2–6	2–1	1–4	1–0	1–6	0–0	0–3	2–5	—	0–3	0–7	3–2	0–2	3–2	2–2	0–3	0–2	3–1	0–3	1–1
Hallam	1–4	2–2	7–0	2–2	2–2	3–2	2–0	1–2	3–3	—	2–4	2–2	3–0	2–2	3–1	4–1	5–1	1–0	3–1	4–0
Handsworth	3–1	2–2	2–1	3–1	4–3	1–2	2–1	3–3	1–1	1–5	—	4–1	0–1	5–2	6–2	0–0	0–1	1–1	3–6	3–1
Knaresborough Town	2–0	1–1	2–1	3–0	0–0	0–0	3–0	1–1	1–2	0–0	3–1	—	3–1	1–3	1–2	2–1	0–0	4–0	3–2	2–0
Parkgate	1–3	1–3	3–1	3–0	0–2	2–1	3–2	2–1	3–0	0–1	1–1	4–1	—	1–2	1–3	1–2	1–4	2–1	2–0	3–2
Penistone Church	1–3	3–1	1–1	3–0	1–2	1–0	7–2	0–3	1–0	2–3	2–2	2–2	0–0	—	5–2	4–1	2–3	0–1	0–0	3–2
Pickering Town	1–4	2–0	0–2	0–1	3–1	1–1	3–1	1–2	4–1	2–1	1–0	3–3	1–0	0–3	—	3–0	1–2	5–0	1–0	2–0
Rossington Main	4–1	1–2	1–2	3–0	1–2	1–0	1–1	0–3	5–0	1–2	2–3	2–1	4–1	0–3	4–1	—	4–6	2–0	4–4	3–1
Silsden	0–0	3–0	1–1	4–2	3–0	1–1	4–0	3–2	2–2	1–0	4–3	3–2	2–0	2–0	3–2	2–2	—	2–2	3–0	0–2
Tadcaster Albion	2–2	1–3	0–1	3–0	0–2	3–2	1–3	1–1	6–0	0–2	3–0	0–3	2–3	2–0	1–1	1–0	3–1	—	2–4	3–0
Thackley	3–1	3–0	2–1	3–0	2–0	1–0	3–1	1–2	2–2	2–1	1–2	3–1	2–2	3–2	0–2	2–2	2–3	2–1	—	3–0
Winterton Rangers	0–2	1–2	1–0	0–1	0–3	0–2	1–1	0–3	2–0	0–5	0–2	2–1	1–0	0–0	2–1	0–1	1–4	0–0	1–5	—

Source: Northern Counties East Football League
Legend: Blue = home team win; Yellow = draw; Red = away team win.
For upcoming matches, an "a" indicates there is an article about the rivalry between the two participants.

=== Play-offs ===
Semi-finals
3	Golcar United	0
4	Beverley Town	1
2	Hallam	1
5	Thackley	0

Final
4	Beverley Town	2 (3)
2	Hallam	2 (4)

==== Semifinals ====
12 April	Golcar United	0–1	Beverley Town	Golcar
15:00		Report	Suluburic 68'	Stadium: Skye Direct Stadium; Attendance: 1,127

12 April	Hallam	1–0	Thackley	Crosspool
15:00	South 69'	Report		Stadium: Sandygate; Attendance: 1,358

==== Final ====
19 April	Hallam	2–2 (4–3 p)	Beverley Town	Crosspool
15:00	Haworth 50'; Allan 56'	Report	Snelgrove 9', 45'	Stadium: Sandygate; Attendance: 1,563
	Penalties
	Buttle (penalty scored); Brownell (penalty scored); Haworth (penalty scored); Blakeley (penalty missed); Allan (penalty scored)		(penalty scored) Plummer; (penalty scored) Piercy; (penalty scored) Connelly; (penalty missed) Sani

=== Stadia and locations ===
Location of the clubs in the 2024–25 NCEL Premier Division on a map of Yorkshire and the Humber

Club	Stadium	Capacity
Albion Sports	Horsfall Stadium (Note: home of Bradford (Park Avenue) (groundshare))	3,500
Barton Town	Marsh Lane	3,000
Beverley Town	Norwood Park	1,000
Bottesford Town	Birch Park	1,000
Campion	Scotchman Road	1,000
Eccleshill United	Plumpton Park, Kingsway, Wrose	2,225
Frickley Athletic	Westfield Lane	2,087
Golcar United	Skye Direct Stadium, Longfield Avenue	1,200
Goole	Victoria Pleasure Grounds	3,000
Hallam	Sandygate	1,300
Handsworth	Oliver's Mount	2,500
Knaresborough Town	Manse Lane	1,000
Parkgate	Roundwood Sports Complex	1,000
Penistone Church	Church View Road	1,000
Pickering Town	Mill Lane	2,000
Rossington Main	Welfare Ground	2,000
Silsden	Keighley Road Stadium	1,500
Tadcaster Albion	Ings Lane	2,000
Thackley	Dennyfield	3,000
Winterton Rangers	West Street	3,000

== Division One ==
Northern Counties East League Division One
- Champions: Horbury Town
- Promoted: Horbury Town; Wombwell Town
- Relegated: Shelley (resigned); Yorkshire Amateur
- Matches: 462
- Goals: 1,614 (3.49 per match)
- Biggest home win: Wakefield 8–0 Yorkshire Amateur (12 October 2024); Horbury Town 9–1 Appleby Frodingham (25 January 2025); Brigg Town 8–0 Swallownest (5 April 2025)
- Biggest away win: Dronfield Town 1–9 Wombwell Town (21 December 2024)
- Highest scoring: Dronfield Town 1–9 Wombwell Town (21 December 2024); Horbury Town 9–1 Appleby Frodingham (25 January 2025)
- Longest winning run: Dearne & District (6 games)
- Longest unbeaten run: Dearne & District/Wombwell Town (8 games)
- Longest losing run: Glasshoughton Welfare/Dronfield Town/Athersley Recreation (3 games)
- Highest attendance: 545 (Horbury Town 0–1 Wakefield, 4 January 2025)
- Lowest attendance: 34 (Yorkshire Amateur 2–1 Louth Town, 30 November 2024)
- Average attendance: 149

Division One consists of 22 clubs.

The following eight clubs left Division One before the season:

- Beverley Town - promoted to Northern Counties East League Premier Division
- Clay Cross Town - transferred to United Counties League Division One
- Ollerton Town - relegated to Regional Feeder Leagues
- Parkgate - promoted to Northern Counties East League Premier Division
- Retford - transferred to United Counties League Division One
- Retford United - transferred to United Counties League Division One
- Shirebrook Town - promoted to United Counties League Premier Division North
- Staveley Miners Welfare - transferred to United Counties League Division One

The following seven clubs joined Division One before the season:

- Appleby Frodingham - promoted from Lincolnshire League
- Club Thorne Colliery - promoted from Humber Premier League
- Dearne & District - promoted from Central Midlands League Premier Division North
- Ilkley Town - transferred from North West Counties League Division One North
- Maltby Main - relegated from NCEL Premier Division
- Shelley - transferred from North West Counties League Division One North
- South Leeds (known as Middleton when first admitted) - promoted from Yorkshire Amateur League Supreme Division

=== League table ===
Pos	Team	Pld	W	D	L	GF	GA	GD	Pts	Promotion, qualification or relegation
1	Horbury Town (C, P)	42	30	5	7	100	33	+67	95	Promotion to the Premier Division
2	Wombwell Town (O, P)	42	29	7	6	113	47	+66	94	Qualification for the play-offs
3	Wakefield	42	29	4	9	98	35	+63	91	Qualification for the play-offs
4	Dearne & District	42	25	9	8	97	50	+47	84	Qualification for the play-offs
5	Ilkley Town	42	24	4	14	81	60	+21	76	Qualification for the play-offs
6	Worsbrough Bridge Athletic	42	20	10	12	82	75	+7	70	
7	Brigg Town	42	21	6	15	94	57	+37	69	
8	Selby Town	42	21	6	15	77	68	+9	69	
9	South Leeds	42	19	8	15	89	76	+13	65	
10	Maltby Main	42	19	7	16	77	72	+5	64	
11	Club Thorne Colliery	42	16	14	12	60	48	+12	62	
12	Harrogate Railway Athletic	42	17	9	16	71	63	+8	60	
13	Armthorpe Welfare	42	15	6	21	68	79	−11	51	
14	Glasshoughton Welfare	42	13	10	19	68	84	−16	49	
15	Louth Town	42	14	7	21	68	88	−20	49	
16	Swallownest	42	14	5	23	55	90	−35	47	Transfer to the United Counties League
17	Shelley (R)	42	11	13	18	59	81	−22	46	Resigned to the West Yorkshire Association Football League
18	Athersley Recreation	42	13	5	24	59	86	−27	44	
19	Nostell Miners Welfare	42	9	10	23	52	84	−32	37	
20	Dronfield Town	42	10	5	27	65	101	−36	32 (Note: Dronfield Town were deducted 3 points for fielding unregistered player Jake Hatton vs. Wombwell Town on 21 December 2024 and vs. Athersley Recreation on 18 January 2025.)	Reprived from relegation, then transfer to the United Counties League
21	Appleby Frodingham	42	9	6	27	49	110	−61	30 (Note: Appleby Frodingham were deducted 3 points for fielding banned player Dean McCarthy vs. Armthorpe Welfare on 30 November 2024.)	Reprived from relegation
22	Yorkshire Amateur (R)	42	4	4	34	32	127	−95	16	Relegation to the Yorkshire Amateur League

Source: Northern Counties East Football League
Rules for classification: 1) points; 2) goal difference; 3) number of goals scored; 4) number of matches won; 5) head-to-head results
(C) Champions; (O) Play-off winners; (P) Promoted; (R) Relegated

=== Results table ===
Home \ Away	APF	ARW	ATH	BRG	CTC	D&D	DRO	GHW	HRA	HOR	ILK	LOU	MAM	NMW	SLB	SHE	SLE	SWA	WAK	WOM	WBA	YOR
Appleby Frodingham	—	1–0	2–2	0–5	1–1	1–4	2–1	0–3	0–3	0–3	0–2	1–2	3–1	2–1	1–3	0–2	0–2	1–2	1–1	0–1	4–1	5–0
Armthorpe Welfare	2–3	—	4–0	0–2	1–1	0–3	2–1	1–1	2–2	1–2	2–4	0–2	1–4	2–0	1–2	2–1	1–2	7–2	1–5	0–5	2–1	1–0
Athersley Recreation	3–0	0–2	—	2–1	0–2	0–1	1–3	3–1	1–1	1–4	2–3	4–2	1–4	0–0	2–2	4–0	0–1	1–2	0–2	0–1	0–0	3–0
Brigg Town	2–0	2–0	1–0	—	2–0	1–0	4–0	1–1	0–3	1–1	0–2	1–3	6–1	2–0	3–3	0–3	4–0	8–0	0–4	0–2	2–3	5–1
Club Thorne Colliery	3–1	0–0	1–2	2–1	—	1–1	1–0	1–2	3–2	0–0	1–0	3–0	2–2	0–0	1–1	3–1	1–0	1–0	3–1	0–1	A/W	2–1
Dearne & District	2–2	2–1	2–0	6–1	3–3	—	1–1	7–1	1–1	2–2	5–2	0–2	5–2	2–1	1–3	2–1	5–2	1–1	2–0	1–2	0–3	3–0
Dronfield Town	6–2	2–3	1–2	0–5	1–0	2–4	—	2–2	0–2	2–3	1–2	0–1	2–1	0–1	2–3	1–1	4–1	0–5	0–1	1–9	4–0	3–1
Glasshoughton Welfare	0–1	3–1	3–4	2–2	2–2	0–1	5–3	—	2–1	1–2	2–1	2–3	2–1	0–1	1–0	0–0	0–5	1–2	0–1	3–5	0–2	5–0
Harrogate Railway Athletic	5–0	2–1	1–2	1–1	1–4	1–3	4–3	5–0	—	0–3	3–1	1–1	0–2	3–2	3–0	1–2	1–4	2–0	3–1	0–2	1–1	4–1
Horbury Town	9–1	3–1	3–1	2–0	1–1	2–1	6–0	3–0	4–0	—	1–2	2–0	5–1	4–0	2–1	3–0	1–2	1–0	0–1	0–0	4–1	2–1
Ilkley Town	3–1	1–3	1–2	1–2	3–1	1–0	0–4	4–3	3–1	2–0	—	3–0	2–0	3–3	3–1	3–0	1–2	3–0	1–3	1–1	2–2	4–1
Louth Town	6–0	3–1	5–1	1–6	2–1	1–2	1–2	3–4	3–1	1–3	1–0	—	1–5	4–1	0–2	3–3	1–1	2–0	0–5	2–2	2–2	1–3
Maltby Main	2–1	3–1	2–1	2–0	0–1	1–1	1–2	0–2	0–0	1–4	1–2	2–1	—	1–2	2–1	4–0	4–1	3–1	2–1	1–2	6–2	3–1
Nostell Miners Welfare	5–3	2–4	4–0	0–7	1–1	0–0	2–0	2–0	1–3	0–2	0–2	1–1	0–2	—	1–5	1–1	1–3	0–0	1–2	0–4	0–4	7–0
Selby Town	3–2	4–1	3–1	2–0	1–1	0–4	2–1	3–2	0–3	1–3	1–1	3–0	1–3	3–0	—	3–2	3–2	2–1	1–1	0–2	1–2	2–0
Shelley	1–1	0–2	1–3	2–2	1–2	1–3	3–2	2–2	2–1	1–0	1–3	2–1	1–1	D–D	3–1	—	0–5	4–1	0–0	0–4	2–2	2–0
South Leeds	5–1	1–1	4–3	2–0	2–0	1–3	3–3	1–1	4–2	0–1	2–4	3–3	1–1	1–5	1–2	2–2	—	2–3	2–1	1–1	2–3	4–1
Swallownest	1–2	1–4	2–1	1–3	3–0	0–4	1–0	2–1	1–1	1–3	0–2	3–0	0–0	2–0	1–3	3–1	3–6	—	0–2	1–2	0–2	2–1
Wakefield	4–0	4–0	4–0	2–1	2–1	1–2	4–0	0–1	0–0	3–1	1–2	4–1	1–2	2–1	1–0	3–1	1–0	6–2	—	1–0	4–0	8–0
Wombwell Town	3–2	0–1	4–1	1–4	2–1	3–0	4–2	4–5	2–0	1–0	4–1	4–0	5–1	2–0	6–2	2–2	1–3	3–3	2–3	—	4–0	4–1
Worsbrough Bridge Athletic	4–0	2–2	6–2	0–2	1–1	0–4	3–3	1–1	0–1	0–4	1–0	2–1	5–1	4–2	1–0	5–3	3–0	3–0	1–3	3–3	—	4–1
Yorkshire Amateur	1–1	0–6	0–3	1–4	2–7	2–3	2–0	1–1	0–1	0–1	1–0	2–1	1–1	3–3	0–3	0–4	0–3	1–2	0–4	0–3	1–2	—

Source: Northern Counties East Football League
Legend: Blue = home team win; Yellow = draw; Red = away team win.
For upcoming matches, an "a" indicates there is an article about the rivalry between the two participants.

=== Play-offs ===
Semi-finals
3	Wakefield	0
4	Dearne & District	1
2	Wombwell Town	2
5	Ilkley Town	1

Final
4	Dearne & District	2
2	Wombwell Town	3

==== Semifinals ====
19 April	Wakefield	0–1	Dearne & District	Featherstone
15:00		Report	Austin 90'	Stadium: Post Office Road; Attendance: 923

19 April	Wombwell Town	2–1	Ilkley Town	Wombwell
15:00	Agnew 67'; Kershaw 75'	Report	Maville-Anku 14'	Stadium: Recreation Ground; Attendance: 603

==== Final ====
26 April	Wombwell Town	3–2	Dearne & District	Wombwell
15:00	Kershaw 10'; Fearon 24', 52'	Report	Lowe 31'; Austin 79'	Stadium: Recreation Ground; Attendance: 1,498

=== Stadia and locations ===
Location of the clubs in the 2024–25 NCEL Division One on a map of Yorkshire and the Humber

Club	Stadium	Capacity
Appleby Frodingham	Brumby Hall Sports Ground	1,100
Armthorpe Welfare	The Marra Falcons Stadium	2,500
Athersley Recreation	Sheerien Park	2,050
Brigg Town	The Hawthorns	2,500
Club Thorne Colliery	Welfare Ground, Moorends	1,200
Dearne & District	Welfare Community Ground, Goldthorpe	700
Dronfield Town	Stonelow Ground	500
Glasshoughton Welfare	Glasshoughton Centre	2,000
Harrogate Railway Athletic	Station View	3,500
Horbury Town	Slazengers Sports Complex	500
Ilkley Town	Ben Rhydding Sports club	559
Louth Town	Marshlands	500
Maltby Main	Muglet Lane	2,000
Nostell Miners Welfare	The Welfare Ground	1,500
Selby Town	Richard Street	5,000
Shelley	Stafflex Arena	700
South Leeds	South Leeds Stadium	3,450
Swallownest	(The Swall Siro) Miners Welfare Ground	500
Wakefield	Post Office Road	6,594
Wombwell Town	Recreation Ground	500
Worsbrough Bridge Athletic	Park Road	2,000
Yorkshire Amateur	Bracken Edge	1,550

== League Cup ==
2024–25 Northern Counties East Football League League Cup
Tournament details
- Country: England
- Teams: 42

Final positions
- Champions: Beverley Town (1st title)
- Runners-up: Knaresborough Town

The 2024–25 Northern Counties East Football League League Cup is the 42nd season of the league cup competition of the Northern Counties East Football League.

Quarter-finals

4 March 2025	Knaresborough Town (PD)	1–0	Hallam (PD)	Knaresborough
19:45	Hudson 3'			Stadium: Hummel Stadium; Attendance: 112

5 March 2025	Penistone Church (PD)	1–1 (a.e.t.) (5–4 p)	Handsworth (PD)	Penistone
19:45	Scrivens 16'		Bishop 75'	Stadium: Parker Roofing Memorial Ground; Attendance: 164

11 March 2025	Beverley Town (PD)	5–3	Rossington Main (PD)	Beverley
19:45	Suluburic 16', 21', 31'; Hill 51'; Knaggs 74'		Mantle 67', 88'; Murillo 90'	Stadium: Norwood Park; Attendance: 127

11 March 2026	Golcar United (PD)	0–3	Silsden (PD)	Golcar
19:45			Greaves 9', 82'; Fox 76'	Stadium: Skye Direct Stadium; Attendance: 142

Semi-finals

1 April 2025	Knaresborough Town (PD)	0–0 (a.e.t.) (5–4 p)	Penistone Church (PD)	Knaresborough
19:45				Stadium: Hummel Stadium; Attendance: 186

8 April 2025	Beverley Town (PD)	3–2	Silsden (PD)	Beverley
19:45	Birch 37'; Connelly 44', 90'		Greaves 54'; Fox 79'	Stadium: Norwood Park; Attendance: 300

Final

6 May 2025
19:45

Beverley Town (PD)	3–2	Knaresborough Town (PD)
Sani 10'; Snelgrove 35' (pen.); Connelly 45'		Priestley 45'; Lazenby 63'

Glanford Park, Scunthorpe
Attendance: 587
