= Handsworth F.C. =

Association football club in England

Coordinates: 53.384291°N 1.391817°W

Handsworth
- Full name: Handsworth Football Club
- Nickname: The Ambers
- Founded: 2014
- Ground: Olivers Mount, Sheffield
- Manager: Jon Froggatt and Mark Ward
- League: Northern Counties East League Premier Division
- 2025–26: Northern Counties East League Premier Division, 7th of 20
Home colours

Handsworth Football Club is a football club based in Handsworth, Sheffield, South Yorkshire, England. They are currently members of the Northern Counties East League Premier Division and play at Olivers Mount in Darnall.

== History ==
The club was formed as Handsworth Parramore in 2014 as the result of a merger between Handsworth and Worksop Parramore; work on the merger had begun in 2013 and was finalised the following year. The new club took Worksop Parramore's place in the Premier Division of the Northern Counties East League. In their first season the club won the League Cup, beating Cleethorpes Town 4–3 in the final, coming back from 3–1 down with six minutes remaining.

In June 2019, the club was renamed Handsworth.

=== Season-by-season record ===
Season	Division	Level	Position	FA Cup	FA Vase	Notes
2014–15	Northern Counties East League Premier Division	9	7/21	PR	1R	
2015–16	Northern Counties East League Premier Division	9	2/22	PR	3R	
2016–17	Northern Counties East League Premier Division	9	4/22	3QR	1R	
2017–18	Northern Counties East League Premier Division	9	4/22	2QR	1R	
2018–19	Northern Counties East League Premier Division	9	8/20	PR	1R	
2019–20	Northern Counties East League Premier Division	9	–	PR	2QR	League season abandoned due to COVID-19 pandemic
2020–21	Northern Counties East League Premier Division	9	–	EPR	2QR	League season abandoned due to COVID-19 pandemic
2021–22	Northern Counties East League Premier Division	9	8/20	3QR	1QR	
2022–23	Northern Counties East League Premier Division	9	16/20	PR	2QR	
2023–24	Northern Counties East League Premier Division	9	13/20	EPR	1QR	
2024–25	Northern Counties East League Premier Division	9	7/20	EPR	1R	
2025–26	Northern Counties East League Premier Division	9	7/20	EPR	1QR	
Season	Division	Level	Position	FA Cup	FA Vase	
Source: Football Club History Database

== Grounds ==
Olivers Mount was the home ground of the original Handsworth, but it failed a ground grading test in 2012 which resulted in the club being relegated from the Northern Counties East League. Parramore Sports played at Sandy Lane in Worksop, which they bought after Worksop Town were evicted in 2008. After the merger in 2014, the club's first team played at Sandy Lane (which Worksop Town had returned to as tenants), while reserve and youth team games were played at Olivers Mount. The first team moved to Olivers Mount in 2020.

== Honours ==
- Northern Counties East League
  - League Cup winners 2014–15

== Records ==
- Best FA Cup performance: Third qualifying round, 2016–17, 2021–22
- Best FA Vase performance: Third round, 2015–16
- Record attendance: 1,561 vs Sheffield United, friendly match, 29 July 2016

== See also ==
- Handsworth F.C. players
- Handsworth F.C. managers
