= Swallownest F.C. =

Association football club in England

Coordinates: 53°35′7.195″N 1°28′25.194″W

Swallownest
- Full name: Swallownest Football Club
- Nickname: Swall
- Founded: 2006; 20 years ago
- Ground: Miners Welfare Ground, Swallownest
- Chairman: Louise Pink
- Manager: Brad Jones
- League: United Counties League Division One
- 2025–26: United Counties League Division One, 14th of 23
Home colours

Swallownest F.C. is an English football club based in Swallownest, Rotherham, South Yorkshire. They are currently members of the United Counties League Division One.

== History ==
The club first entered senior league football as Aston in 2006, playing in the South Yorkshire Amateur League (SYAL). They won promotion from Division 1 in their first year and followed that up by winning the SYAL title a year later.

In the summer of 2008 they were admitted to the Sheffield & Hallamshire County Senior League (S&HCSL), starting in Division Two. They won two successive promotions to reach the County Senior League Premier Division by 2010, when they changed their name to Swallownest Miners Welfare. A previous team representing the Miners Welfare had competed in the Yorkshire League during the 1960s. In their first season at Step 7 of the National League System, the new Miners Welfare FC clinched the County Senior League championship remaining unbeaten all season.

In 2014/15 they applied for promotion to the Northern Counties East League (NCEL) but ultimately failed to pass a ground grading inspection, and in 2015/16 (the year they were renamed as simply Swallownest) they finished in too low a position to attain promotion. Finally, after winning the S&HCSL Premier Division for a second time in 2017, they won promotion to the NCEL Division One.

In 2025, the club was transferred from the NCEL to the United Counties League.

=== Season-by-season record ===
| Season | Division | Level | Position | FA Vase | Notes |
|---|---|---|---|---|---|
| 2006–07 | South Yorkshire Amateur League Division One | 15 | 3rd/13 | - | Promoted |
| 2007–08 | South Yorkshire Amateur League Premier Division | 14 | 1st/11 | - | Promoted |
| 2008–09 | Sheffield & Hallamshire County Senior League Division Two | 13 | 1st/12 | - | Promoted |
| 2009–10 | Sheffield & Hallamshire County Senior League Division One | 12 | 2nd/13 | - | Promoted |
| 2010–11 | Sheffield & Hallamshire County Senior League Premier Division | 11 | 1st/14 | - | |
| 2011–12 | Sheffield & Hallamshire County Senior League Premier Division | 11 | 3rd/14 | - | |
| 2012–13 | Sheffield & Hallamshire County Senior League Premier Division | 11 | 6th/15 | - | |
| 2013–14 | Sheffield & Hallamshire County Senior League Premier Division | 11 | 5th/14 | - | |
| 2014–15 | Sheffield & Hallamshire County Senior League Premier Division | 11 | 3rd/13 | - | |
| 2015–16 | Sheffield & Hallamshire County Senior League Premier Division | 11 | 7th/14 | - | |
| 2016–17 | Sheffield & Hallamshire County Senior League Premier Division | 11 | 1st/14 | - | Promoted |
| 2017–18 | Northern Counties East League Division One | 10 | 11th/22 | - | |
| 2018–19 | Northern Counties East League Division One | 10 | 10th/20 | 1R | |
| 2019–20 | Northern Counties East League Division One | 10 | – | 1R | League season abandoned due to COVID-19 pandemic |
| 2020–21 | Northern Counties East League Division One | 10 | – | 2QR | League season abandoned due to COVID-19 pandemic |
| 2021–22 | Northern Counties East League Division One | 10 | 18th/21 | 1R | |
| 2022–23 | Northern Counties East League Division One | 10 | 19th/20 | 1R | |
| 2023–24 | Northern Counties East League Division One | 10 | 22nd/23 | 1QR | |
| 2024–25 | Northern Counties East League Division One | 10 | 16th/22 | - | |
| 2025–26 | United Counties League Division One | 10 | 14th/22 | 1QR | |
| 2026–27 | United Counties League Division One | 10 | | | |
| Season | Division | Level | Position | FA Vase | Notes |
Source: Football Club History Database

== Grounds ==
The club originally played at the Leonard Kyte ground in the neighbouring village of Aughton. Upon joining the Sheffield & Hallamshire County Senior League in 2008, the club moved to the Swallownest Miners Welfare ground on Sheffield Road, where they have remained since, the ground is nicknamed "The Swall Siro".

The southern end of the ground in 2015

== Honours ==
=== League ===
- Sheffield & Hallamshire County Senior League Premier Division
  - Champions: 2010–11, 2016–17
- Sheffield & Hallamshire County Senior League Division 1
  - Promoted: 2009–10
- Sheffield & Hallamshire County Senior League Division 2
  - Promoted: 2008–09 (champions)
- South Yorkshire Amateur League Premier Division
  - Champions: 2007–08
- South Yorkshire Amateur League Division One
  - Promoted: 2006–07

=== Cup ===
- South Yorkshire Amateur League Cup
  - Runners-up: 2007–08
