= Jamie Price =

English footballer

Personal information
- Date of birth: 27 October 1981 (age 45)
- Place of birth: Normanton, England
- Position: Defender

Team information
- Current team: Thackley (manager)

Senior career*
Years	Team	Apps	(Gls)
1997–1999	Leeds United	0	(0)
1999–2005	Doncaster Rovers	45	(0)
2003–2004	→ Halifax Town (loan)	5	(0)
2004	→ Burton Albion (loan)	3	(0)
2005–2006	York City	23	(0)
2006–2008	Harrogate Town	76	(2)
2008–2009	Farsley Celtic		
2009–?	Bradford Park Avenue	30	(1)
- Garforth Town
- Ossett Town
2016	Scarborough Athletic		
2019–2023	Emley		

Managerial career
- 2025–: Thackley
- * Club domestic league appearances and goals

James Price (born 27 October 1981) is an English retired footballer and manager who played as a defender. Price has made over 150 appearances in the Football League and Football Conference. He currently manages Thackley.

== Career ==
Price began his career as an apprentice at Leeds United in 1997. He did not make any appearances for Leeds, and moved on to Doncaster Rovers in July 1999. He played a major part in the success of the Doncaster Rovers youth team in the 1999–00 and 2000–01 seasons, and signed a full-time professional contract in the summer of 2001.

He broke into the first team in the 2001–02 season, making 17 league and cup appearances, but an injury suffered in November 2002 meant he missed the remainder of the 2002–03 season. In August 2003, he joined Halifax Town on a one-month loan to get match practice. He did not feature in the first team at the beginning of the 2004–05 season, and joined Burton Albion in September 2004 on loan so to play first team football, but ended his loan spell after one month. Price made 55 appearances in all competitions in six seasons at Doncaster, before being released at the end of the 2004–05 season and joining York City after impressing during pre-season. He made 24 league and cup appearances for York City during the 2005–06 season and then joined Harrogate Town in June 2006.

After two seasons at Harrogate Town, he signed for Farsley Celtic in June 2008, and then joined UniBond side Bradford Park Avenue in February 2009, making his debut in a 6–4 win against Ashton United.

== Honours ==
Doncaster Rovers

- Football League Third Division: 2003–04
