= Campion A.F.C. =

Association football club in England

Coordinates: 53°48′37.9″N 1°47′12.3″W

Campion
- Full name: Campion Association Football Club
- Founded: 1963
- Ground: Scotchman Road, Manningham
- Manager: James Bicknell
- League: Northern Counties East League Premier Division
- 2024–25: Northern Counties East League Premier Division, 9th of 20
Home colours

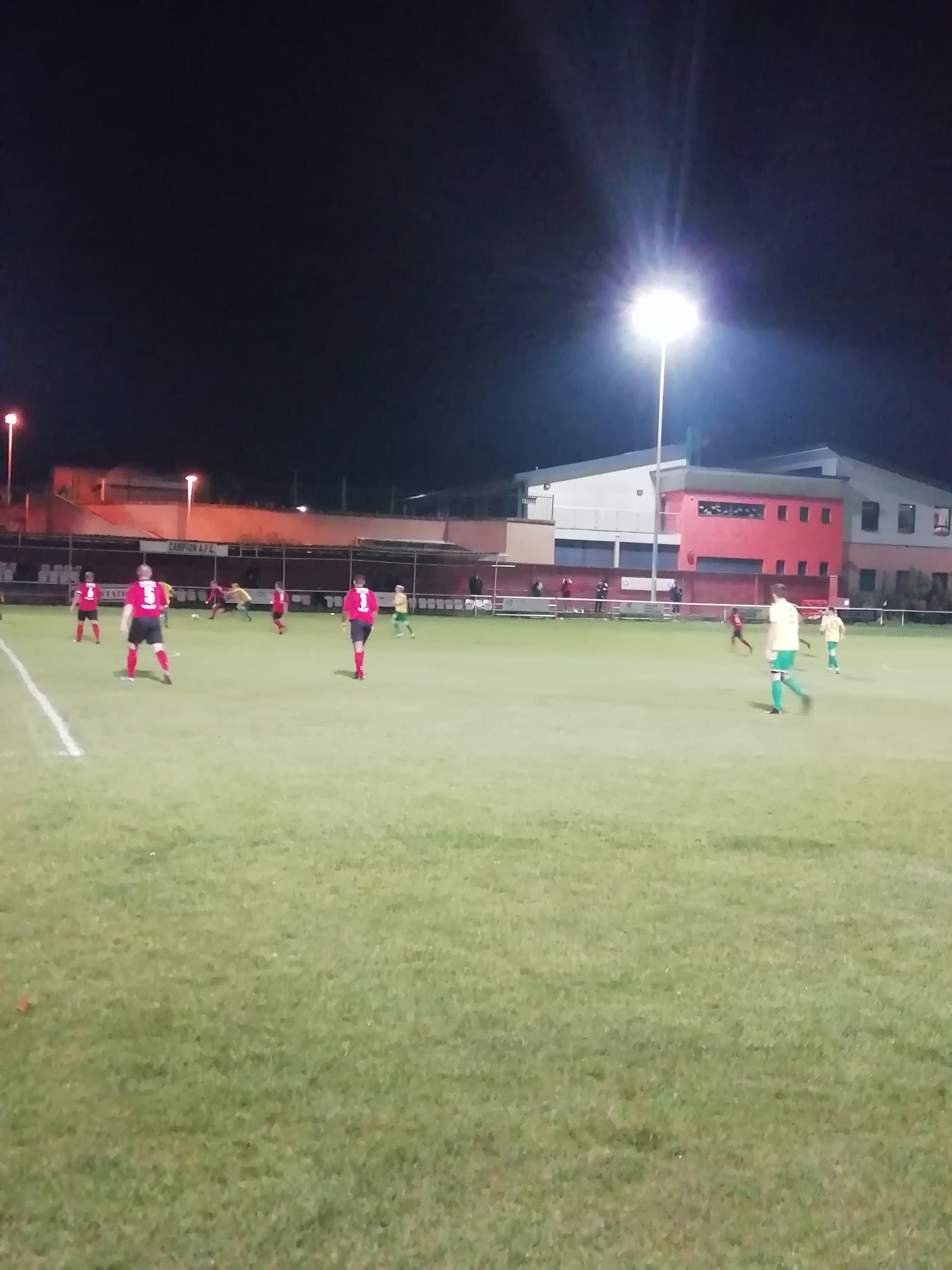
Scotchman Road, the club's home ground.

Campion Association Football Club is a football club based in Manningham area of Bradford, West Yorkshire, England. They are currently members of the Northern Counties East League Premier Division and play at Scotchman Road.

== History ==
The club was established by Michael Mahoney in 1963, with players coming from the St Edmund Campion youth club. In 1975 they joined Division Four of the Bradford Sunday League, and the following season also entered a team to the Red Triangle League, a Saturday league. By 1979 they had reached the league's Premier Division, finishing as runners-up and winning the Premier Division Cup in 1979–80.

In 1981 Campion moved up to the West Riding County Amateur League. Although financial difficulties led to them dropping back into the Red Triangle League for the 1985–86 season, the club returned to the West Riding County Amateur League for the 1986–87 season. In 1989–90 the club were Division Two champions, also winning the divisional cup. They went on to win Division One and the divisional cup in 1992–93, earning promotion to the Premier Division.

Campion won the Premier Division Cup in 2003–04, and then three times in succession between 2005–06 and 2007–08. In 2015–16 the club applied for promotion to Division One of the Northern Counties East League, which was achieved after finishing third. At the end of the 2020–21 season the club were transferred to Division One North of the North West Counties League. In 2022–23 Campion were Division One champions and were promoted to the Premier Division. The following season saw them finish second in the Premier Division, qualifying for the promotion play-offs. They were subsequently beaten 2–0 in the semi-finals by Albion Sports.

== Ground ==
The club play at Scotchman Road. The clubhouse at the ground was built in 2006.

== Honours ==
- Northern Counties East League
  - Division One champions 2022–23
- West Riding County Amateur League
  - Division One champions 1992–93
  - Division Two champions 1989–90
  - Premier Division Cup winners 2003–04, 2005–06, 2006–07, 2007–08
  - Division One Cup winners 1992–93, 1997–98
  - Division Two Cup winners 1989–90
- Red Triangle League
  - Premier Division Cup winners 1979–80
- West Riding Challenge Cup
  - Winners 2006–07
- West Riding Charity Shield
  - Winners 2006–07
- Bradford & District FA Cup
  - Winners 2000–01, 2009–10, 2011–12, 2015–16 2016–17

== Records ==
- Best FA Cup performance: First qualifying round, 2024–25 (replay)
- Best FA Vase performance: First round, 2022–23, 2024–25

== See also ==
- Campion A.F.C. players
