= Yorkshire Ammers F.C. =

Association football club in England

Coordinates: 53°49′24.63″N 1°31′17.46″W

Yorkshire Ammers
- Full name: Yorkshire Ammers Football Club
- Nickname: Ammers
- Founded: November 1918
- Ground: Bracken Edge, Leeds
- Capacity: 1,550 (200 seated)
- Chairman: Will Bowler
- Manager: Casey O'Reilly
- League: Yorkshire Amateur League Supreme Division
- 2025–26: Yorkshire Amateur League Supreme Division (withdrew)
Home colours	Away colours

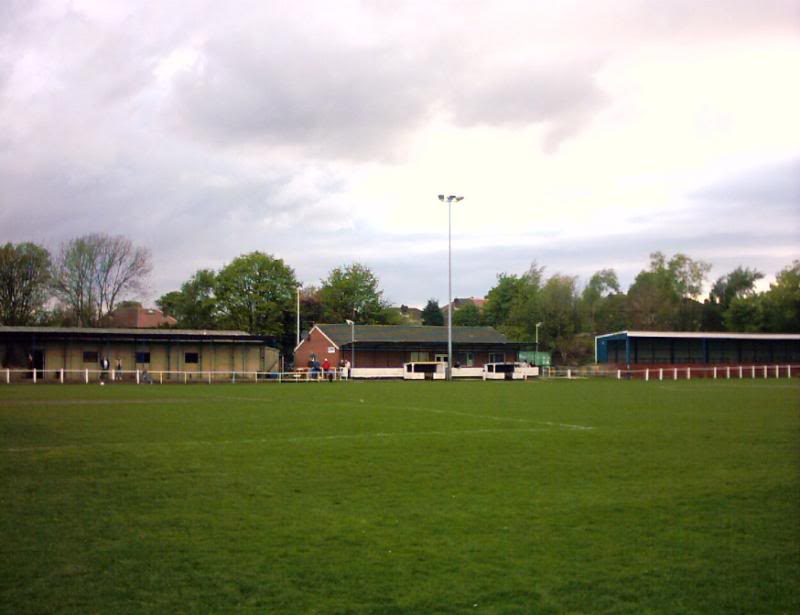
Bracken Edge

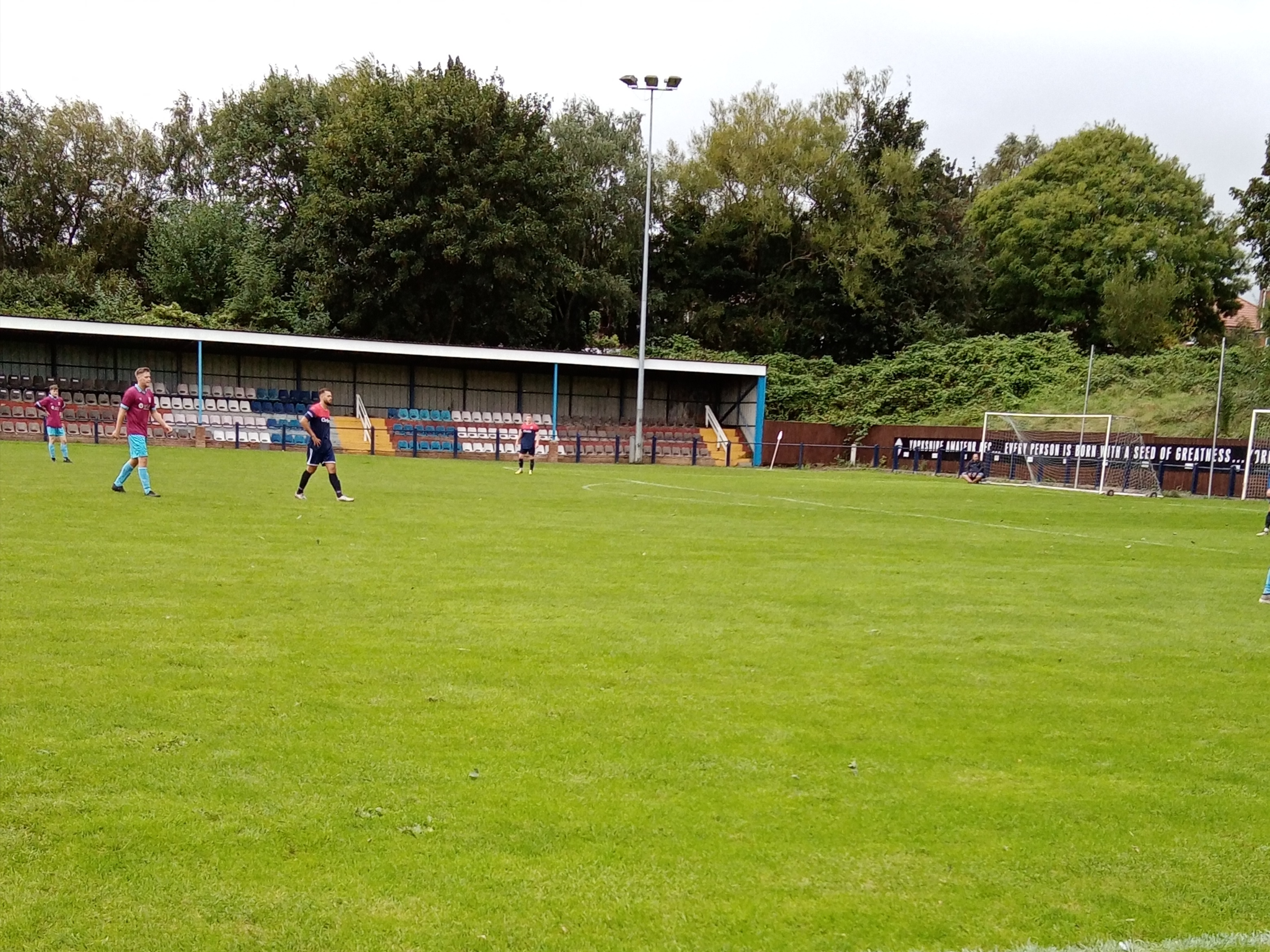
Bracken Edge

Yorkshire Ammers Football Club is a semi-professional football club based in the Potternewton area of Leeds, West Yorkshire, England. They are currently members of the Yorkshire Amateur League Supreme Division and play at Bracken Edge.

== History ==
The club was established by Kolin Robertson in November 1918 as Yorkshire Amateur A.F.C.. They were founder members of the Yorkshire League in 1920, but left after four seasons. The club returned to the league in 1930 and were runners-up in Section B of the Subsidiary Competition in 1930–31, also winning the West Riding Challenge Cup. The following season saw them reach the first round of the FA Cup for the first time, losing 3–1 at home to Third Division North side Carlisle United. They also reached the semi-finals of the FA Amateur Cup, losing 2–1 to Marine at Filbert Street, and won the league's Second Competition, before losing to First Competition winners Huddersfield Town 'A' in a championship decider. In 1932–33 they won the league's inaugural League Cup, before winning the West Riding Challenge Cup again in 1933–34 and 1944–45.

Another FA Cup first round appearance in 1945–46 ended with a 5–2 aggregate defeat to Lincoln City of the Third Division North, with Yorkshire Amateur having led 1–0 from the first leg. The Yorkshire League gained a second division in 1950, with the club became members of Division One. They were relegated to Division Two at the end of the 1951–52 season, but were Division Two runners-up the following season and were promoted back to Division One at the first attempt. After winning the West Riding County Cup in 1953–54, in 1955–56 the club were relegated to Division Two again, remaining there until winning the division in 1958–59, earning promotion back to Division One. They won the County Cup again in 1960–61, but another relegation from Division One in 1962–63 was followed by nine seasons in Division Two, before they finished as runners-up in 1971–72, a season that also saw them win the County Cup, and were promoted to Division One.

Yorkshire Amateur finished bottom of Division One in 1974–75, resulting in relegation to Division Two. At the end of the 1976–77 season the club were relegated to Division Three. The following season saw them win the Division Three title at the first attempt, earning promotion back to Division Two. In 1982 the league merged with the Midland League to form the Northern Counties East League, with Yorkshire Amateur placed in Division Two North. A third-place finish in the division in 1983–84 saw them placed in Division One North amidst league reorganisation. Further league restructuring the following year led to the club becoming members of Division Three.

Division Three was abolished in 1986, with Yorkshire Amateur moved up to Division Two. Division Two was subsequently disbanded in 1991, leading to the club moving up to Division One. They were winners of the league's Wilkinson Sword Trophy in 1998–99, and remained in Division One until finishing as runners-up in 2017–18, which earned them promotion to the Premier Division. After the 2020–21 season was curtailed due to the COVID-19 pandemic, the club were promoted to Division One East of the Northern Premier League. Although they finished in mid-table the following season, the club were demoted back to the Premier Division of the Northern Counties East League after failing to pass the ground grading requirements. They subsequently finished bottom of the Premier Division in 2022–23 season and were relegated to Division One.

In 2024–25 Yorkshire Amateur finished bottom of Division One and were relegated to the Supreme Division of the Yorkshire Amateur League. In June 2025 they were renamed Yorkshire Ammers but the club did not complete its first season under its new name, withdrawing from the League in October 2025.

== Ground ==
The club originally played at Elland Road, which had become available after Leeds City folded. However, in 1920 they sold the lease on the ground to Leeds United for £250. After two years playing at several different grounds, including a groundshare with Harrogate Town, the club relocated to Bracken Edge in 1922.

== Honours ==
- Northern Counties East League
  - Wilkinson Sword Trophy winners 1998–99
- Yorkshire League
  - Second Competition champions 1931–32
  - Division Two champions 1958–59
  - Division Three champions 1977–78
  - League Cup winners 1932–33
- West Riding FA Challenge Cup
  - Winners 1930–31, 1933–34, 1944–45
- West Riding County Cup
  - Winners 1953–54, 1960–61, 1971–72

== Records ==
- Best FA Cup performance: First round, 1931–32, 1945–46
- Best FA Amateur Cup performance: Semi-finals, 1931–32
- Best FA Trophy performance: Preliminary round, 1974–75
- Best FA Vase performance: Third round, 1993–94
- Record attendance: 3,569 vs Wimbledon, FA Amateur Cup quarter-finals, 1932

== See also ==
- Yorkshire Amateur A.F.C. players
