= F.C. Bolsover =

Former association football club in England

Coordinates: 53.207070°N 1.2062913°W

FC Bolsover
- Full name: Football Club Bolsover
- Founded: 2016
- Dissolved: 2019
- Ground: Langwith Road, Shirebrook
- Chairman: Benjamin Thomas
- Manager: Matt Chatfield
Home colours

Football Club Bolsover was a football club based in Bolsover, Derbyshire, England. They played at Shirebrook Town's Langwith Road ground.

== History ==
The club was originally established in 2013, but were denied entry to the Central Midlands League for the 2013–14 season as they were unable to meet the ground grading criteria. In 2016, the club was re-established and joined the North Division of the Central Midlands League. They went on to win the division at the first attempt, earning promotion to Division One of the Northern Counties East League. At the end of the 2018–19 season the club were transferred to the East Midlands Counties League but resigned from the league and withdrew from the FA Vase.

== Grounds ==
The club initially played at Shirebrook Academy before relocating to Shirebrook Town's Langwith Road ground.

== Honours ==
- Central Midlands League
  - North Division champions 2016–17
