= Goole A.F.C. =

Association football club in England

Coordinates: 53°42′11″N 0°52′51″W

- Full name: Goole Association Football Club
- Nickname: The Vikings
- Founded: 1997 (Goole A.F.C.)
- Ground: Victoria Pleasure Grounds, Goole
- Capacity: 3,000 (200 seated)
- Chairman: Alan Wilson
- Manager: Keelan Hall and Jimmy Ghaichem
- League: Northern Counties East League Division One
- 2025–26: Northern Counties East League Division One, 13th of 22
| Home colours | Away colours |

Goole Association Football Club is a semi-professional football club in Goole, East Riding of Yorkshire, England. They are currently members of the Northern Counties East League Division One and play at the Victoria Pleasure Grounds.

== History ==
The club was established by Mike Norman in 1997 as a replacement for Goole Town, which folded at the end of the 1995–96 season. The new club joined the Premier Division of the Central Midlands League and went on to win the division at the first attempt, losing only one league match all season, earning promotion to the Supreme Division. The following season saw the club win the Wakefield Floodlit Cup and the League Cup. A third-place finish also saw them gain promotion into Division One of the Northern Counties East League.

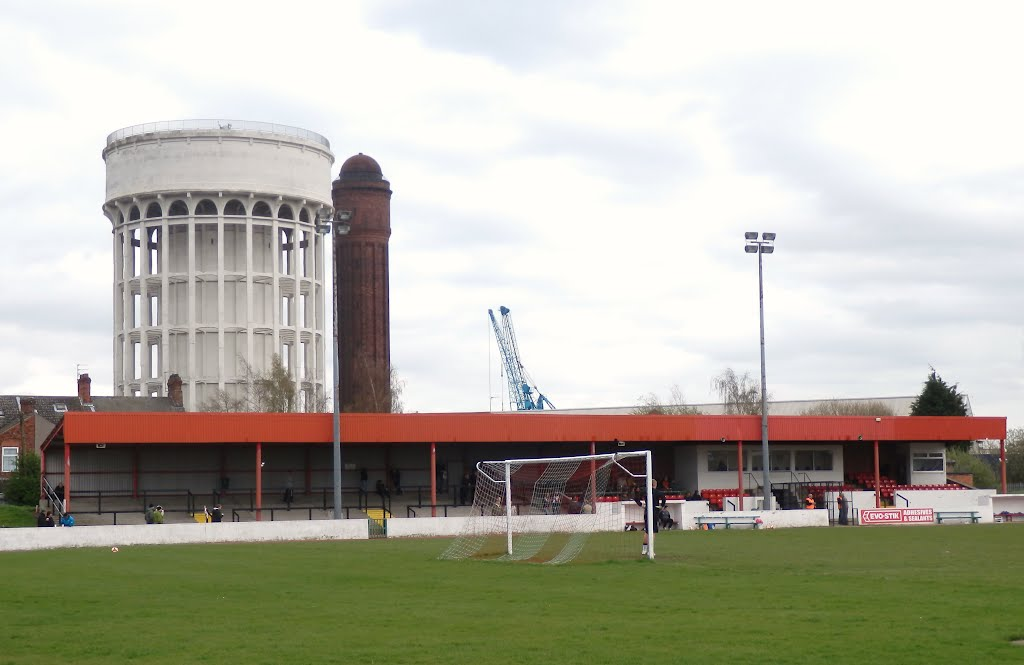
Victoria Pleasure Ground

In Goole's first season in the Northern Counties East League they won both the Wilkinson Sword Trophy and the Division One title, earning promotion to the Premier Division. In 2004–05 the club won the Premier Division, earning promotion to Division One of the Northern Premier League. In 2006–07 they won the West Riding County Cup. League restructuring at the end of the season saw the club placed in Division One South for the 2007–08 season, and they remained in the division until being transferred to Division One North in 2012. Although they were moved back to Division One South the following season, the club were transferred to Division One North again in 2016. After finishing second-from-bottom of the division in 2016–17 the club were due to be relegated until being reprieved when Ilkeston were excluded from the league.

The 2017–18 season saw Goole finish bottom of Division One North, resulting in relegation to the Premier Division of the Northern Counties East League. The club finished second-from-bottom of the Premier Division in 2022–23 but received another relegation reprieve after Hemsworth Miners Welfare were demoted. They finished bottom of the Premier Division again in 2024–25 and were relegated to Division One.

== Honours ==
- Northern Counties East League
  - Premier Division champions 2004–05
  - Division One champions 1999–2000
  - League Trophy winners 1999–2000
- Central Midlands League
  - Premier Division champions 1997–98
  - League Cup winners 1998–99
- West Riding County Cup
  - Winners 2006–07
- Wakefield Floodlit Cup
  - Winners 1998–99

== Records ==
- Best FA Cup performance: Second qualifying round, 2000–01, 2005–06
- Best FA Trophy performance: Second qualifying round, 2005–06, 2014–15
- Best FA Vase performance: Fourth round, 1998–99
- Record attendance: 976 vs Leeds United, friendly match, 1999
- Most goals: Kevin Severn (1997–2001)

== See also ==
- Goole A.F.C. players
- Goole A.F.C. managers
