= Golcar United F.C. =

Association football club

Coordinates: 53°38′30.6″N 1°50′37.4″W

Golcar United
- Full name: Golcar United Football Club
- Nickname: The Weavers
- Founded: 1904
- Ground: Longfield Avenue, Golcar
- Chairman: Peter Gledhill
- Manager: Joe Skarz
- League: Northern Counties East League Premier Division
- 2024–25: Northern Counties East League Premier Division, 3rd of 20
- Website: https://www.golcarunited.co.uk

Golcar United Football Club is a semi-professional football club based in Golcar, Huddersfield, West Yorkshire, England. They are currently members of the Northern Counties East League Premier Division and play at Longfield Avenue.

== History ==
Founded in 1904, the club initially played in the Huddersfield & District League. They joined the West Riding County Amateur League in 1934 and were runners-up in their first season in the league. After finishing bottom of the table in 1937–38, the club left the league.

Golcar won the West Riding County Challenge Cup in 2000–01, and were Premier Division runners-up in 2003–04. The following season saw them win the West Riding County Amateur League title. They were runners-up in 2014–15, and champions in 2017–18. They retained the league title the following season, and were promoted to Division One North of the North West Counties League. In 2021–22 they finished third in the league, qualifying for the promotion play-offs. After beating AFC Blackpool 4–2 on penalties in the semi-finals (after a 2–2 draw), they defeated Holker Old Boys 2–1 in the final to earn promotion to the Premier Division of the Northern Counties East League.

== Ground ==
The club moved to their Longfield Avenue ground in 1955, where the pitch had a noticeable side-to-side slope. Following their promotion to the North West Counties League, floodlights were installed, and were used for the first time on 8 October when the club defeated local rivals Shelley 1–0 in a league match in front of 556 spectators. A 100-seat stand was erected in March 2020. A record attendance of 1,320 was set for a League Cup semi-final match against local rivals Emley on 21 April 2023.

== Honours ==
- West Riding County Amateur League
  - Premier Division champions 2004–05, 2017–18, 2018–19
- West Riding County Challenge Cup
  - Winners 2000–01
- Huddersfield Invitation Cup
  - Winners 1919–20, 1922–23, 1935–36, 1936–37, 1970–71, 2004–05, 2013–14, 2017–18, 2018–19

== Records ==
- Best FA Cup performance: Preliminary round, 2024–25
- Best FA Vase performance: First round, 2021–22, 2022–23
- Record attendance: 1,320 vs Emley, Northern Counties East League League Cup semi-final, 21 April 2023

== See also ==
- Golcar United F.C. players
