= Thackley A.F.C. =

Association football club in England

Coordinates: 53°50′50.82″N 1°43′58.76″W

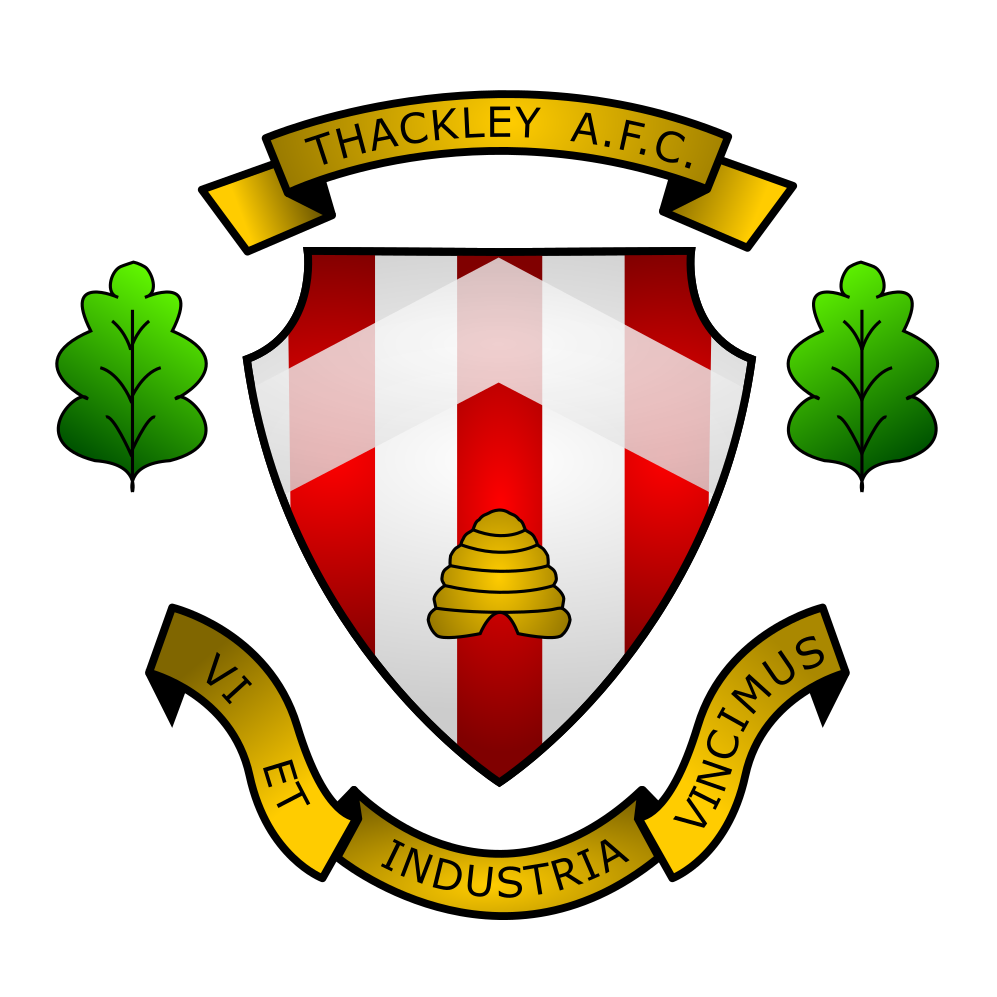
- Full name: Thackley Association Football Club
- Nickname: The Dennyboys
- Founded: 1930
- Ground: Dennyfield Bradford
- Capacity: 3,000 (300 seated)
- Chairman: Ben Oliver
- Manager: Jamie Price
- League: Northern Counties East League Premier Division
- 2024–25: Northern Counties East League Premier Division, 5th of 20
Home colours	Away colours

Thackley A.F.C. are a football club based in Thackley, north Bradford, West Yorkshire, England. The club plays in the Northern Counties East League Premier Division. Their home ground is the Dennyfield, and the primary colours of the club are red and white.

== History ==
Thackley FC was formed in 1930 by members of the Thackley Wesleyan Methodist Church, progressing by way of the Bradford Mutual Sunday School League and the Bradford Amateur League before moving into county-wide leagues and joining the West Riding County Amateur League in 1939, where they would spend 25 years, winning that league on five occasions before a brief spell in the West Yorkshire League. In 1967 Thackley joined the Yorkshire League's Division Two, where they would go on to win and be promoted to Division One in 1974 before becoming a founding member of the Northern Counties East League's Premier Division in 1982. The club has never been promoted or relegated from that division since, with their best season being in 1993–94 when they were runners-up, losing out only on goal difference to Stocksbridge Park Steels.

On the 8th of April 1975 the club would receive a visit from FC Barcelona, who had originally been intended to train at Bradford City’s Valley Parade stadium before their semi-final match of the European Cup against Leeds United, but due to a mix-up, there was a game being played there causing Barcelona to be turned away. A Bradford City representative gave them the number of Stewart Willingham, Thackley's secretary at the time, after a conversation between Stewart and a UK Barcelona representative. Both parties made their way to Dennyfield, where the pitch would open for Barcelona to train. The training session did not serve them well as Leeds United beat them 2-1.

== Honours ==
- West Riding County
  - Challenge Cup Winners 1963–64, 1966–67
  - County Cup Winners 1973–74, 1974–75
  - Amateur League Winners 5 times
- West Yorkshire League
  - Winners 1965–66, 1966–67
- Yorkshire League
  - Division 2 Champions 1973–74
- Northern Counties East League
  - League Cup Winners 2011–12, 2012–13
- Bradford & District Senior Cup
  - Winners 13 times.

== Records ==
- Best FA Trophy performance: Second qualifying round, 1977–78
- Best FA Cup performance: Second qualifying round, 1980–81, 1993–94, 1998–99, 2001–02, 2010–11
- Best FA Vase Performance: Fifth round, 1980–81
- Best attendance: 1500 vs Leeds Utd, 1983

== Ground ==
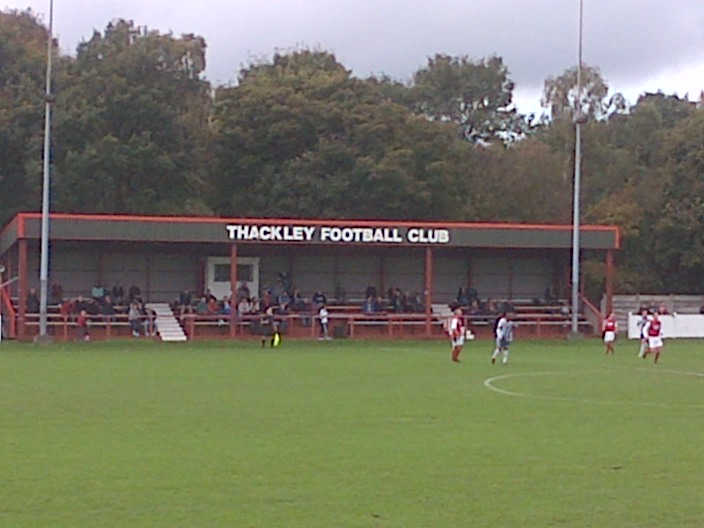
MAIN STAND FA VASE GAME 2013 VERSUS COLNE FC

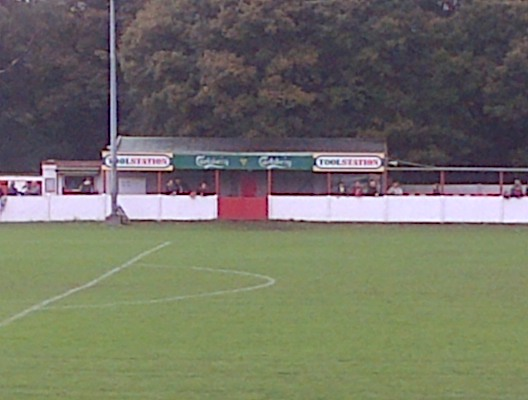
COVERED WALKWAY FA VASE GAME VERSUS COLNE FC

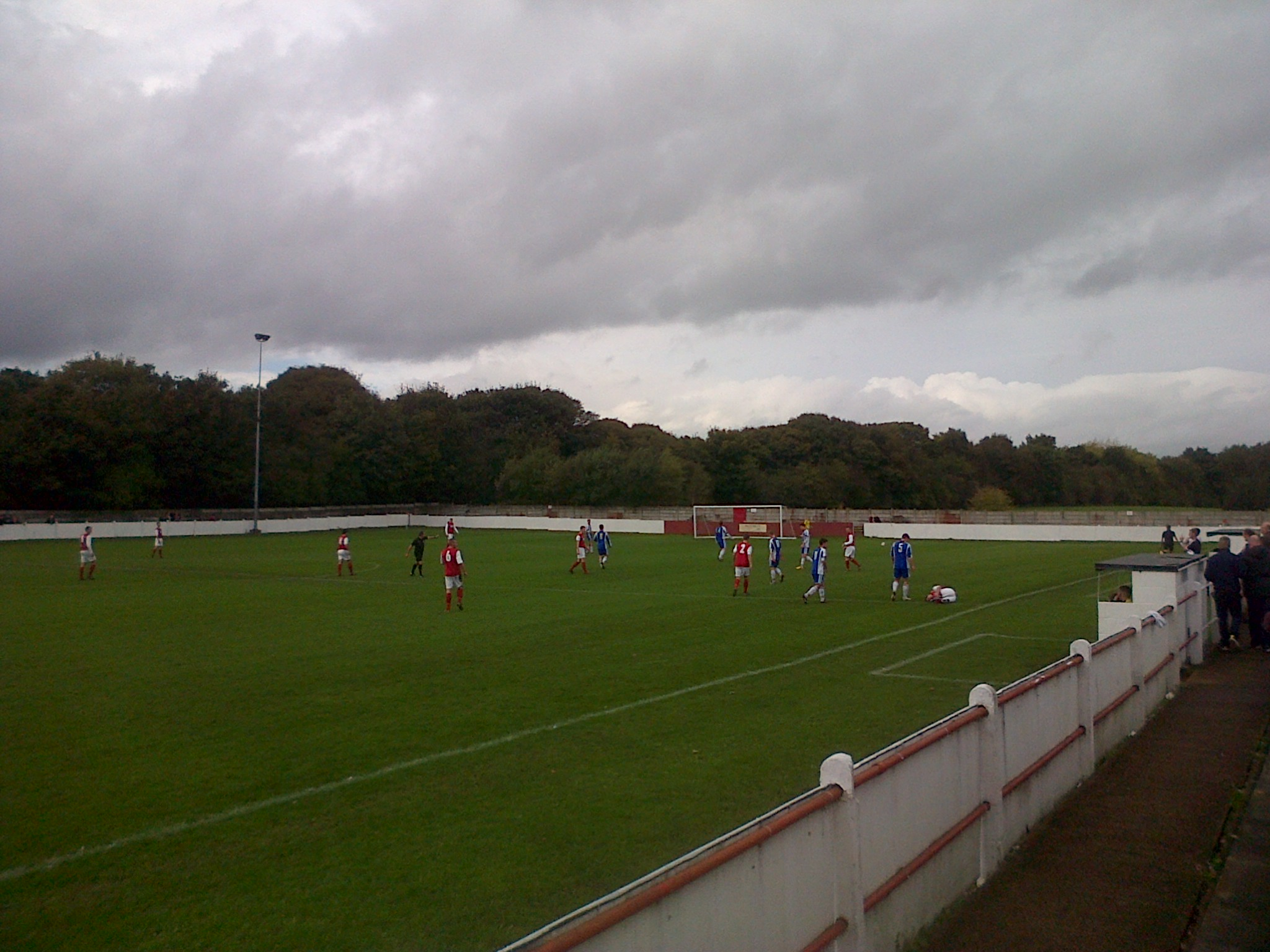
ESHOLT END OF GROUND VERSUS COLNE FC

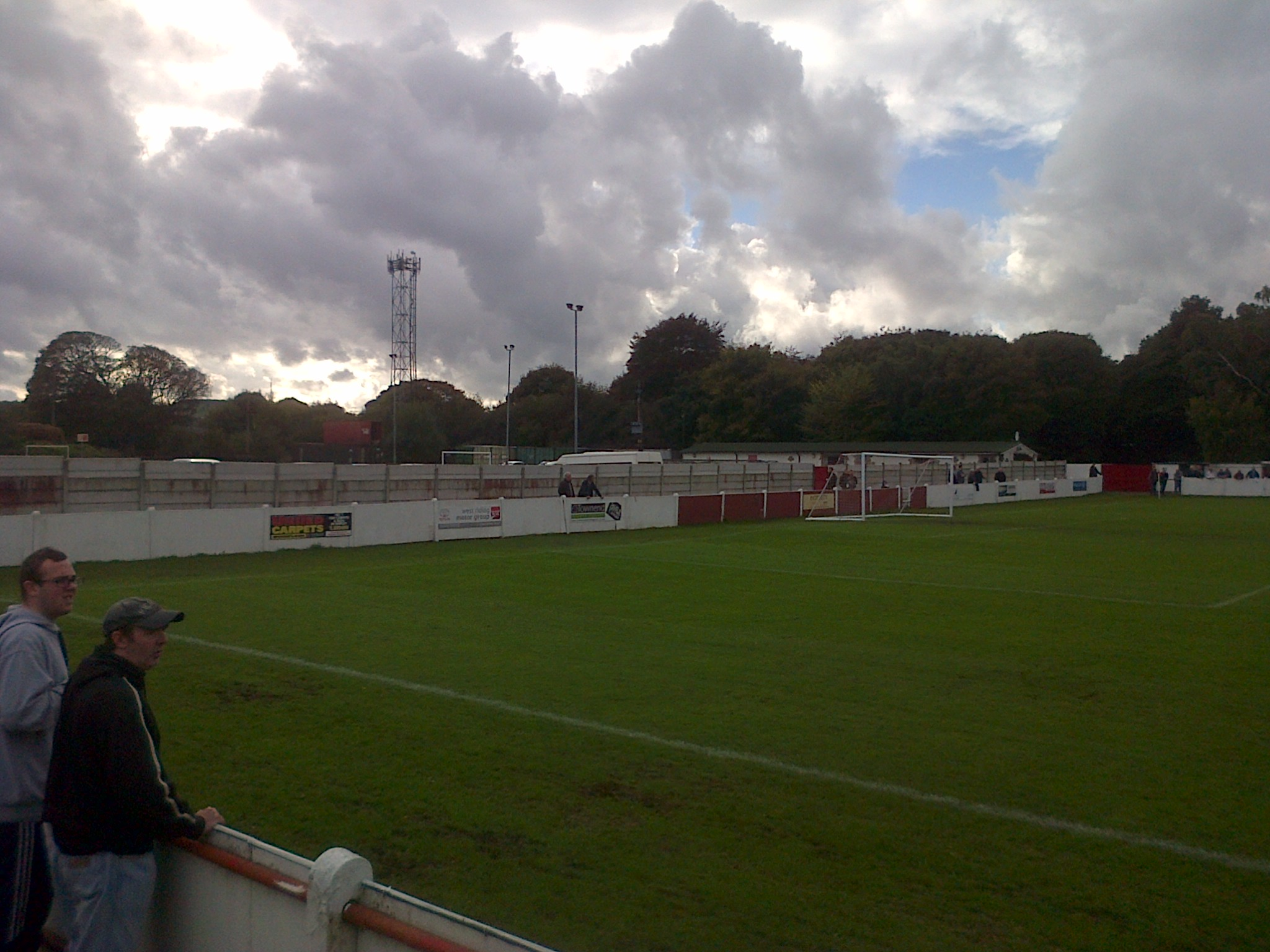
THACKLEY FC TOWN END OF GROUND

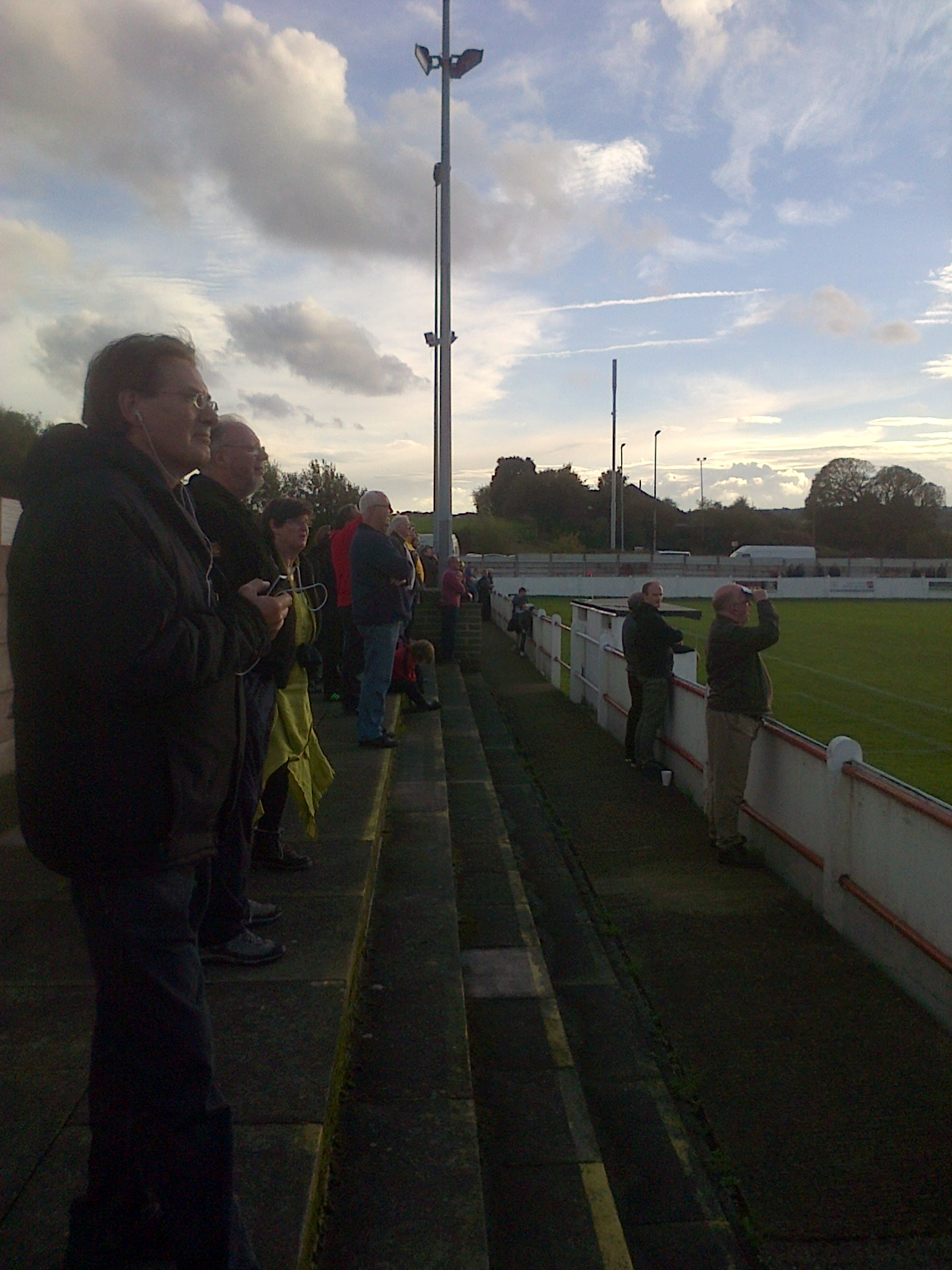
THACKLEY FC FAR SIDE UNCOVERED TERACING
