= Knaresborough Town A.F.C. =

Association football club in England

Coordinates: 54°00′16.15″N 1°26′58.82″W

Knaresborough Town
- Full name: Knaresborough Town Association Football Club
- Nickname: The Boro
- Founded: 1898
- Ground: Manse Lane, Knaresborough
- Capacity: 1,000 (73 seated)
- Chairman: Paul Howard, Nigel Corner
- Manager: Simon Parkes
- League: Northern Counties East League Premier Division
- 2024–25: Northern Counties East League Premier Division, 12th of 20
Home colours	Away colours

Knaresborough Town Association Football Club is a football club based in Knaresborough, North Yorkshire, England. They are currently members of the Northern Counties East League Premier Division and play at Manse Lane.

== History ==
The club was established as 'Trinity' in 1898 and renamed Knarsborough AFC in 1900. They joined the York League and were champions in their first season, going on to retain the title for the next two season. The club were champions again in 1907–08, and moved up to the Northern League in 1909. In 1910 they were founder members of the Yorkshire Combination, also continuing to play in the Northern League. However, they left the Northern League after finishing bottom of the table in 1910–11, at which point they rejoined Division One of the York League. The club withdrew its team from the Yorkshire Combination at the end of the 1912–13 season, continuing only in the York League; however, after finishing bottom of Division One in 1912–13 they were suspended from the league for the 1913–14 season.

After World War I Knaresborough were readmitted to Division One. They were Division One champions in 1924–25 and retained the title the following season. The club won the Division One championship again in 1928–29, but resigned from the league after finishing second-from-bottom in 1930–31. They rejoined Division One in 1932 and won back-to-back league titles in 1933–34 and 1934–35. However, the club left the league again in 1938. They returned in 1951, joining Division Three B, which they won at the first attempt. The following season saw them win Division Two B, earning promotion to Division One. The club left the league again in 1956 and joined the West Yorkshire League. They were promoted to Division One at the end of the 1956–57 season, but relegated the following season. After finishing as runners-up in Division Two North in 1960–61, they were promoted to Division One. However, they finished bottom of Division One the following season and were relegated again.

Knaresborough subsequently dropped into the Harrogate & District League, winning the Premier Division in 1964–65 and the Premier Division and League Cup double in 1965–66. After a third successive league title in 1966–67, the club won the League Cup again in 1967–68. They returned to the West Yorkshire League, winning the Division Two in 1969–70 and the League Cup the following season. However, the club then dropped back into the Harrogate & District League until rejoining the West Yorkshire League in 1993. They were Premier Division champions in 2008–09 and runners-up in 2010–11. After finishing third in the Premier Division in 2011–12, the club were promoted to Division One of the Northern Counties East League. In 2017–18 they were Division One champions, earning promotion to the Premier Division.

== Ground ==
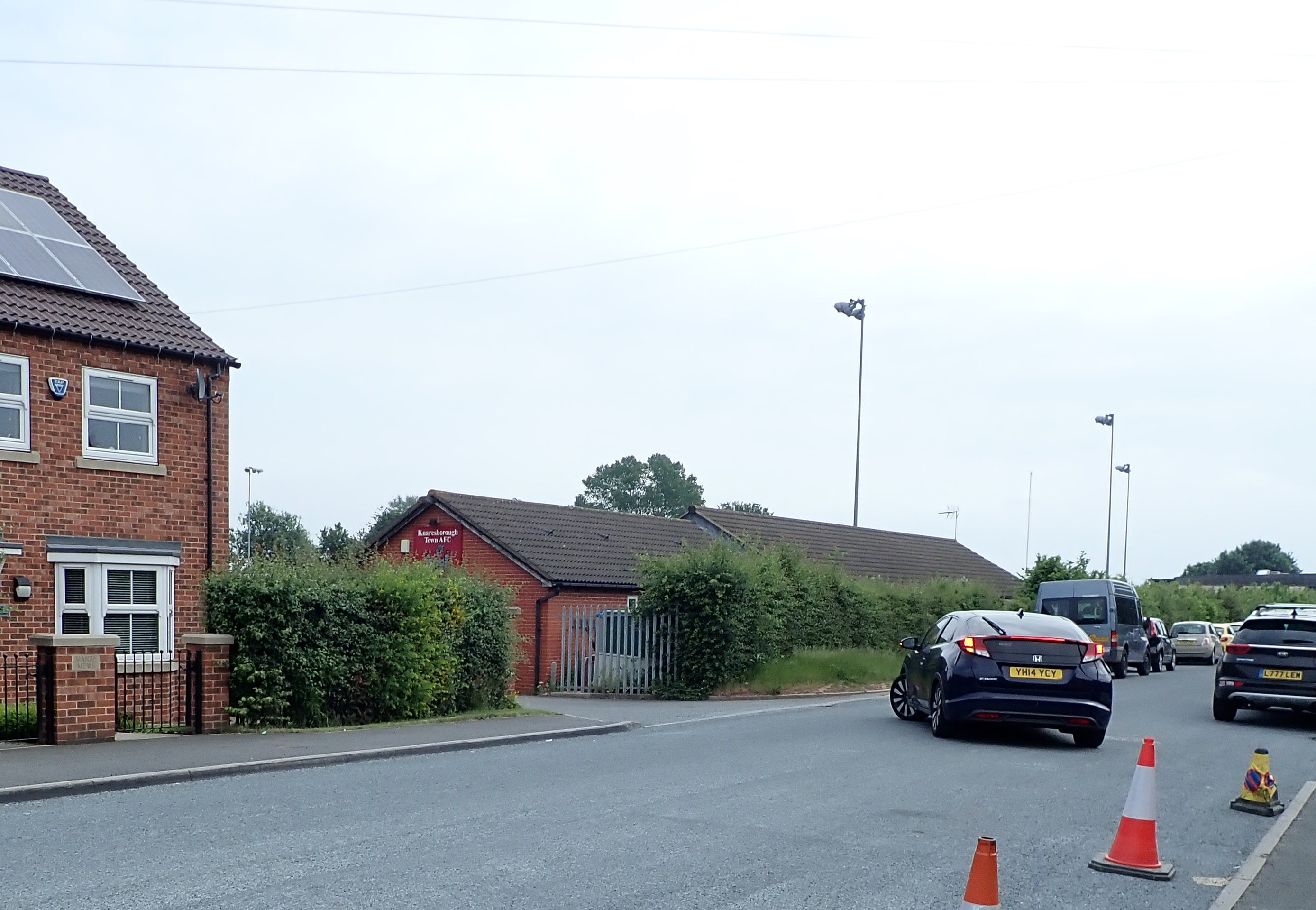
Manse Lane

The club play at Manse Lane, which has a brick-built covered stand on one side of the pitch. The ground has a capacity of 1,000, of which 73 is seated and 173 covered.

== Coaching staff ==
- First Team Manager: Simon Parkes
- Assistant First Team Manager: Colin Heath
- Head Coach: Loz Hunter
- Reserve Team Manager: Simon Swales
- Assistant Reserve Team Manager: Craig Robinson

== Honours ==
- Northern Counties East League
  - Division One champions 2017–18
- West Yorkshire League
  - Premier Division champions 2008–09
  - Division Two champions 1969–70
  - Challenge Trophy winners 2009–10
  - League Cup winners 1993–94
  - Division One League Cup winners 1970–71
  - Division Two League Cup winners 1958–59, 1960–61
- Harrogate & District League
  - Champions 1964–65, 1965–66, 1966–67
  - League Cup winners 1965–66, 1967–68
- York League
  - Champions 1902–03, 1903–04, 1904–05, 1907–08, 1924–25, 1925–26, 1928–29, 1933–34, 1934–35
  - Division Two B champions 1952–53
  - Division Three B champions 1951–52
- West Riding Challenge Cup
  - Winners 2009–10
- West Riding Challenge Trophy
  - Winners 2010–11
- Whitworth Cup
  - Winners 1907–08, 1911–12, 1920–21, 1922–23, 1925–26, 1926–27, 1927–28, 1929–30, 1932–33, 1933–34, 1936–37, 1958–59, 1964–65, 1968–69, 1971–72, 1973–74, 1988–89, 1994–95, 2005–06, 2007–08, 2009–10

== Records ==
- Best FA Cup performance: Second qualifying round, 2018–19
- Best FA Vase performance: Second round, 2017–18

== See also ==
- Knaresborough Town A.F.C. players
