= Dronfield Town F.C. =

Association football club in England

Coordinates: 53.302486°N 1.4570108°W

Dronfield Town
- Full name: Dronfield Town Football Club
- Founded: 1998
- Ground: Stonelow Playing Fields, Dronfield
- Capacity: 500 (80 seated)
- Chairman: Patrick Williams
- Manager: Vacant
- League: United Counties League Division One
- 2025–26: United Counties League Division One, 8th of 23
Home colours

Dronfield Town Football Club is a football club based in Dronfield, Derbyshire, England. They are currently members of the United Counties League Division One and play at the Stonelow Playing Fields.

== History ==
A Dronfield Town existed in the mid-1890s but folded in around 1914. Although the club was revived in the 1920s, they were dissolved shortly afterwards. Another incarnation of the club in the 1950s also folded soon after being re-established. The club was re-established again in 1973 as a Sunday league team, playing in the Sheffield Sunday League. They continued until folding in 1996.

The modern club was originally formed as Dronfield Sports Junior Football Club, before becoming Dronfield Town when they moved to the Pioneer Club ground in 1998. An adult team was established under the name Dronfield Cavaliers, but became Dronfield Town in 2001. They joined the Hope Valley Amateur League in 2001 and were B Division runners-up in 2001–02, earning promotion to the A Division. A second successive promotion was secured in 2002–03 and the Premier Division title was won at the first attempt in 2003–04. In 2005 they moved up to Division One of the Midlands Regional Alliance, which they also won at the first attempt, earning promotion to the Premier Division. The club went on to win the Premier Division in 2007–08, and in 2009 they moved up to the Premier Division of the Central Midlands League.

Dronfield's first season in the Premier Division saw them finish as runners-up, earning promotion to the Supreme Division. In 2011 league restructuring saw them placed in the North Division. They won the League Cup in 2011–12 and were North Division champions in 2012–13, resulting in promotion to Division One of the Northern Counties East League. At the end of the 2024–25 season the club were transferred to Division One of the United Counties League.

== Ground ==
The club play at Stonelow Road in Dronfield. The ground has a covered stand and three sides of hard standing. Its capacity is 500, of which 100 is covered and 80 is seated.

== Honours ==
- Central Midlands League
  - North Division champions 2012–13
  - League Cup winners 2011–12
- Midlands Regional Alliance
  - Premier Division champions 2007–08
  - Division One champions 2005–06
- Hope Valley Amateur League
  - Premier Division champions 2003–04
  - Lawrence Cup winners 2004–05
  - Supplementary Cup winners 2004–05
  - Cliff Ellis Trophy winners 2002–03
  - Roden Cup winners 2001–02

== Records ==
- Best FA Vase performance: First round, 2014–15, 2015–16
