= Barton Town F.C. =

Association football club in England

Coordinates: 53°41′22.841″N 0°26′4.132″W

Barton Town
- Full name: Barton Town Football Club
- Nickname: The Swans
- Founded: 1995
- Ground: Marsh Lane, Barton-upon-Humber
- Capacity: 3,000 (240 seated)
- Chairman: Mark Gregory
- Manager: Anthony Bowsley
- League: Northern Counties East League Premier Division
- 2025–26: Northern Counties East League Premier Division, 5th of 20
Home colours	Away colours

Barton Town Football Club is a football club based in Barton-upon-Humber, Lincolnshire, England. They are currently members of the Northern Counties East League Premier Division and play at Marsh Lane.

== History ==
The club was formed as Barton Town Old Boys Football Club in 1995 as a result of a merger between Barton Town and Barton Old Boys, with the new club taking Barton Town's place in the Lincolnshire League. After finishing fourth in the league in their first season, they won the Lincolnshire League the following season, and then finished as runners-up in both 1997–98 and 1998–99.

In 2000 the club switched to the Humber Premier League, where they played for a single season before joining the Premier Division of the Central Midlands League. After finishing as runners-up in 2001–02, they were promoted to the Supreme Division. The club went on to win the Supreme Division in 2005–06, and after finishing as runners-up the following season, were promoted to Division One of the Northern Counties East League. The 2010–11 season saw Barton finish in second place, earning promotion to the Premier Division.

In 2017 the club was renamed Barton Town. They won the League Cup in 2021–22, defeating Garforth Town 3–2 in the final. In 2025–26 the club finished fifth in the Premier Division, qualifying for the promotion play-offs, in which they lost 1–0 to Beverley Town in the semi-finals.

== Ground ==
The club play at Marsh Lane (currently known as the Easy Buy Ground for sponsorship purposes). It has a capacity of 3,000, of which 240 is seated and 540 covered.

== Honours ==
- Northern Counties East League
  - League Cup winners 2021–22
- Central Midlands League
  - Supreme Division champions 2005–06
- Lincolnshire League
  - Champions 1996–97

== Records ==
- Best FA Cup performance: Third qualifying round, 2026–27
- Best FA Vase performance: Second round, 2010–11, 2011–12, 2014–15

== See also ==
- Barton Town F.C. players
- Barton Town F.C. managers
