= English football league system =

- Country: England
- Sport: Association football
- Promotion and relegation: Yes

National system
- Federation: Football Association
- Confederation: UEFA
- Top division: Premier League
- Second division: EFL Championship
- Cup competition: EFL Cup; FA Community Shield; FA Cup

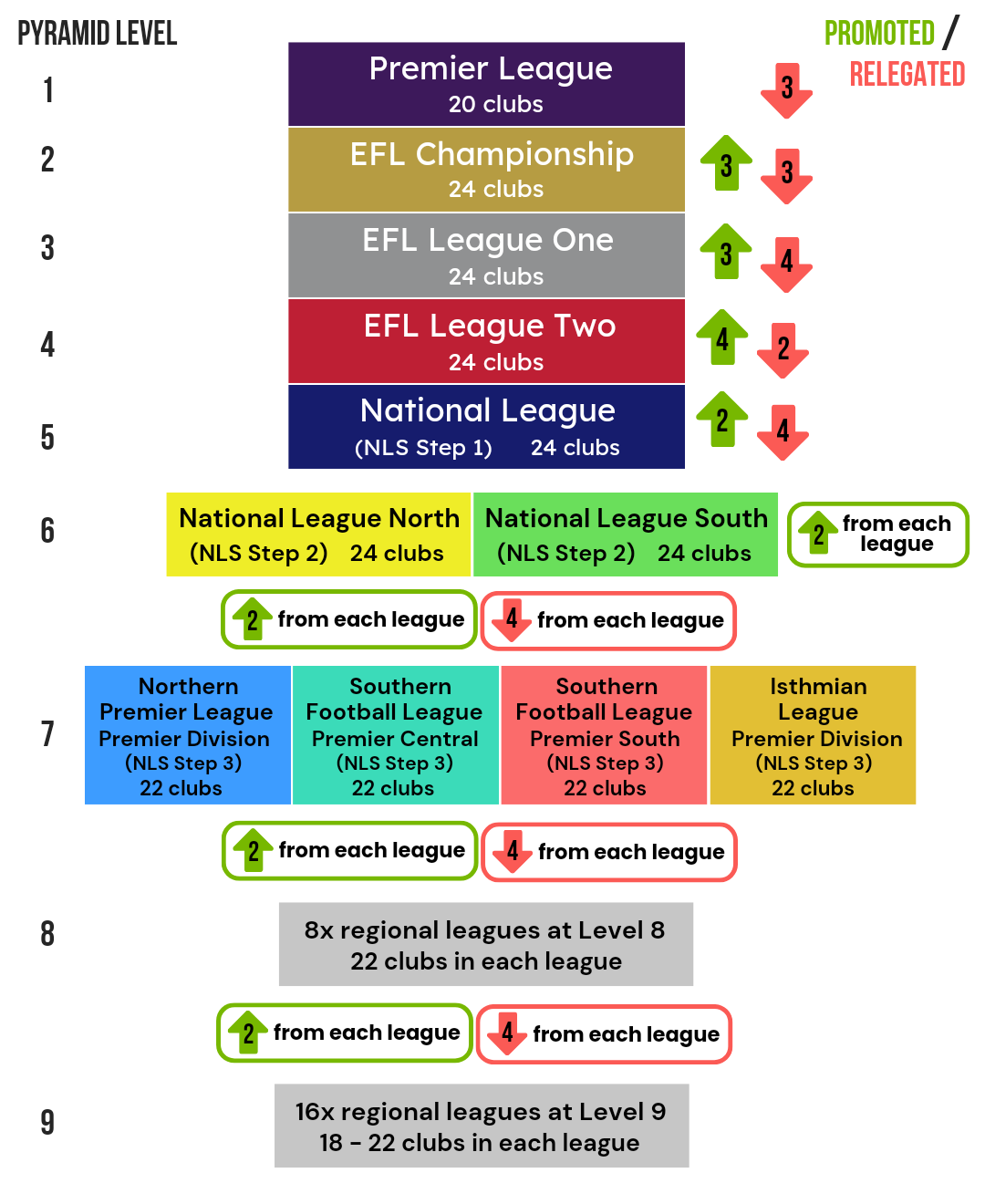
The English football league pyramid.

The English football league system, also known as the football pyramid, is a series of interconnected leagues for men's association football clubs in England, with five teams from Wales, one from Guernsey, one from Jersey and one from the Isle of Man also competing. The system has a hierarchical format with promotion and relegation between leagues at different levels, allowing even the smallest club the theoretical possibility of ultimately rising to the very top of the system, the Premier League. Below that are levels 2–4 organised by the English Football League, then the National League System from levels 5–10 administered by the FA, and thereafter Regional feeder leagues run by relevant county FAs on an ad hoc basis.

The exact number of clubs varies from year to year as clubs join and leave leagues, merge, or fold altogether, but an estimated average of 15 clubs per division implies that more than 7,000 teams of nearly 5,300 clubs are members of a league in the English men's football league system.

The pyramid for women's football in England runs separately into ten tiers. There are no official definitions of any level below 11 for men or below 10 for women. Any references to the structure at lower levels should not be regarded as definitive.

Some England-based men's clubs play outside the English football league system.

== History ==
The world's first association football league, named simply The Football League, was created in 1888 by Aston Villa's club director William McGregor. It was dominated by those clubs who had supported professionalism. The twelve founding members were six from Lancashire (Accrington, Blackburn Rovers, Burnley, Bolton Wanderers, Everton and Preston North End) and six from the Midlands (Aston Villa, Derby County, Notts County, Stoke, West Bromwich Albion and Wolverhampton Wanderers).

In May 2014, the Football Association announced provisional plans for a new division between the English Football League and the National League which would include "B" teams of higher-level clubs. They later reneged on the plan to include Premier League "B" teams in the new division and shortly thereafter scrapped the idea altogether.

The following are the historical and current divisions by tier; the numbered ones may be referred to as "Division N" or "Nth Division":

Tier	1888–1892	1892–1920	1920–1921	1921–1958	1958–1992	1992–2004	2004–
I	Football League	1				FA Premier / Premier League	
II	—N/a	2				1	Football League Championship
III	—N/a		3	3 South and 3 North	3	2	Division/League One
IV	—N/a				4	3	Division/League Two

== Structure ==
Geographical division of Level 9 teams in 2022–23

The English football league system consists of a pyramid of leagues, bound together by the principle of promotion and relegation. A certain number of the most successful clubs in each league can rise to a higher league, whilst those that finish the season at the bottom of their league can be sent down a level. In addition to sporting performance, promotion is usually contingent on meeting criteria set by the higher league, especially concerning appropriate facilities and finances.

The top five levels contain one division each and are nationwide in scope. Below this, the levels have progressively more parallel leagues, with each covering progressively smaller geographic areas. Many leagues have more than one division. At the lower levels the existence of leagues becomes intermittent, although in some of the more densely populated areas there are leagues more than twenty layers below the Premier League. There are also leagues in various parts of the country which are not officially part of the system as they do not have formal agreements with other leagues, but are recognised at various levels by county football associations. Clubs from these leagues may, if they feel they meet the appropriate standard of play and have suitable facilities, apply to join a league which does form part of the system.

=== Pyramid structure ===
The top of the pyramid is the Premier League (level 1, which is often referred to as the "top flight"), containing 20 clubs. Below the Premier League is the English Football League (EFL) (formerly 'the Football League'), which is divided into three divisions of 24 clubs each: The Championship (level 2), League One (level 3), and League Two (level 4). The 20 clubs in the Premier League and 72 clubs in the English Football League are all full-time professional clubs. Before the establishment of the Premier League in 1992, the Football League, as it was called then, included all 92 clubs, in four divisions. Clubs outside the Football League were referred to as non-League clubs, and this naming continues for clubs below the four professional divisions. Levels 1 to 4 are known as "League Football."

The top tier of non-League football is the National League. It contains a nationwide division (also called the National League) (level 5; step 1) of 24 clubs, and is the lowest level with a single nationwide league. This division, like the four above, is a full-time professional competition, although some promoted clubs retain part-time status. There are two divisions at level 6 (step 2), covering the north (National League North) and south (National League South), with 24 clubs each. Some of these clubs are full-time professional and the others are semi-professional. Below level 6, some of the stronger clubs are semi-professional, but continuing down the tiers, soon all the clubs are amateur.

Below the National League are three regional leagues at levels 7 and 8 (steps 3 and 4), each covering different parts of England, though with some geographical overlap. These are the Northern Premier League (covering northern England), the Southern Football League (serving the Midlands, southern, and southwestern England, with one club from South Wales) and the Isthmian League (including clubs from southeastern England as well as Guernsey in the Channel Islands). The Southern League manages two parallel Premier Divisions at level 7 and two lower divisions at level 8. The Northern Premier League and Isthmian League each administer one Premier Division at level 7 and three level 8 divisions. All divisions typically consist of 22 teams.

Level 9 (step 5) contains the top divisions of a large group of 16 sub-regional leagues. Each of these leagues has a different divisional setup, but they all have one thing in common: there are yet more leagues below them, each covering smaller and smaller geographical levels.

The six levels immediately below League Two are known as the National League System and come under the jurisdiction of The Football Association.

The English football league system does not include the amateur version of the game often called Sunday league football. These leagues are independent entities with no promotion or relegation involving the football pyramid. However, some Sunday league clubs have been known to join pyramid leagues if they desire to progress higher. There are also some Saturday leagues which are not officially part of the pyramid, although teams frequently leave these for pyramid leagues.

== Promotion and relegation rules for the top eight levels ==
Geographical division of Level 7 teams in 2022–23

1. Premier League (level 1, 20 teams): The bottom three teams are relegated.
2. English Football League Championship (level 2, 24 teams): The top two teams are automatically promoted to the Premier League; the next six teams compete in the play-offs for the third promotion place (bottom three are relegated). From the 2026–27 season, the play-off format was expanded from four to six teams following a vote by EFL clubs: teams finishing third and fourth advance directly to the two-legged semi-finals, while one-legged quarter-final ties are played with fifth hosting eighth and sixth hosting seventh. The winners of the quarter-finals progress to the semi-finals (still two-legged), with the final continuing to be played at Wembley Stadium in late May.
3. English Football League One (level 3, 24 teams): Top two are automatically promoted; next four compete in play-offs, with the winner gaining the third promotion spot. The bottom four are relegated.
4. English Football League Two (level 4, 24 teams): Top three teams are automatically promoted; next four compete in play-offs, with the winner gaining the fourth promotion spot. The bottom two are relegated.
5. National League (level 5, 24 teams): The champions are promoted; next six compete in play-offs, with the winner gaining the second promotion spot. The bottom four are relegated to either North or South division as appropriate.
6. National League North and National League South (level 6, 24 teams each, running in parallel): The champions in each division are automatically promoted; next six teams in each division compete in play-offs, with the play-off winner in each division getting the second promotion spot, with four teams qualifying to the National League in total. The bottom four teams in each division relegated to either Northern Premier League, Southern League or Isthmian League as appropriate. If, after promotion and relegation, the number of teams in the North and South divisions is not equal, one or more teams are transferred between the two divisions to even them up again based on geographic factors.
7. Northern Premier League Premier Division, Southern Football League Premier Central, Southern Football League Premier South, and Isthmian League Premier Division (level 7, 22 teams each, leagues running in parallel): The champions in each division are automatically promoted; next four teams in each division compete in play-offs, with the play-off winners also promoted. The bottom four teams in each division relegated to a level 8 division as appropriate. If, after promotion and relegation, the number of teams in the divisions is not equal, one or more teams are transferred among the four divisions to even them up again.
8. Northern Premier League Division One East, Northern Premier League Division One Midlands, Northern Premier League Division One West, Southern Football League Division One East, Southern Football League Division One West, Isthmian League Division One North, Isthmian League Division One South Central and Isthmian League Division One South East (level 8, running in parallel, 22 teams in each division): The champions in each division are automatically promoted; next four teams in each division compete in play-offs, with the play-off winners also promoted. The bottom four teams in each division are relegated to a level 9 division as appropriate. If, after promotion and relegation, the number of teams in the divisions is not equal, one or more teams are transferred between the divisions to even them up again.

== Cup eligibility ==
Being members of a league at a particular level also affects eligibility for Cup, or single-elimination, competitions.

- FA Cup: Levels 1 to 9 (Teams from Levels 1 to 4 qualify automatically for the main competition, teams from Levels 5 to 9 enter the qualifying rounds)
- EFL Cup: Levels 1 to 4
- EFL Trophy: Levels 3 to 4 (16 U21 teams from clubs in Levels 1 and 2 compete since 2016–17)
- FA Trophy: Levels 5 to 8
- FA Vase: Levels 9 to 10
- FA Inter-League Cup: Level 11 (contested by representative teams from each league)
- National League Cup: Level 5 (16 U21 teams from clubs in Levels 1 and 2 also compete)

In the case of the FA Cup, entrance from Level 10 clubs depends upon ranking within the league the club is in, and depends on the number of Level 9 clubs participating. For instance, the 2017–18 FA Cup saw 77 teams compete from level 10 out of the 338 in total at that level.

Below level 11, the pyramid becomes regional and the cups become accordingly regional. Further down the pyramid is split on a county basis, counties having their own cups accordingly. This excludes some tournaments marked "Senior Cups", which often are competitions between teams representing top professional clubs in a given district, and may be little more than derbies, such as the Gloucestershire Cup, which originally included all teams in Gloucestershire, but then came to be contested as a Bristol derby.

== The system ==
Level one in the pyramid, the top division of English football, is run by the Premier League (which gives its name to the competition in that division), the winners of which are regarded as the champions of England. Levels two to four are run by the English Football League. Together, these four divisions make up what is known as "league football".

The leagues below level four are classed as "non-League football", meaning they are outside the EFL. The leagues at levels five to ten constitute the National League System (NLS) and come under the direct jurisdiction of the Football Association. The top level (level 5) of the NLS is known as "step 1", the next (level 6) as "step 2", and so on. Until 2020, level 11 divisions were designated as "step 7", but that year were re-designated as "Regional Feeder Leagues". It often happens that the Premier Division of a Regional Feeder League (Step 7 or Level 11) has its constitution given to it by the FA. They have to accept it or appeal but cannot reject it at an annual general meeting.

After the 2023–24 season, four runners-up competed in the play-offs where an additional club was guaranteed promotion from each step 5 division, with the number of relegations from each of the eight level 8 divisions remained at two as each step 4 division increased its divisional size to 22 teams. The resulting 16 vacancies at step 5 were filled by relegating only one club per level 9 division, rather than two. Ahead of 2024–25, two promotions out of each step 5 division into its step 4 counterpart remained and the number of clubs automatically relegated out of each step 5 division reverted to two, reflecting a long-term FA aim to "create consistency" at each step of the NLS pyramid.

Level	Total clubs (1894)	League(s) / division(s)															
1	20	Premier League; 20 clubs – 3 relegations															
2	24	EFL Championship; 24 clubs – 3 promotions, 3 relegations															
3	24	EFL League One; 24 clubs – 3 promotions, 4 relegations															
4	24	EFL League Two; 24 clubs – 4 promotions, 2 relegations															
5 (Step 1)	24	National League; 24 clubs – 2 promotions, 4 relegations															
6 (Step 2)	48	National League North; 24 clubs – 2 promotions, 4 relegations								National League South; 24 clubs – 2 promotions, 4 relegations							
7 (Step 3)	88	Northern Premier League Premier Division; 22 clubs – 2 promotions, 4 relegations				Southern League Premier Division Central; 22 clubs – 2 promotions, (Note: Promotion to either the National League North or National League South is based on geographic factors.) 4 relegations				Southern League Premier Division South; 22 clubs – 2 promotions, 4 relegations				Isthmian League Premier Division; 22 clubs – 2 promotions, 4 relegations			
8 (Step 4)	176	Northern Premier League Division One East; 22 clubs – 2p, 4r		Northern Premier League Division One West; 22 clubs – 2p, 4r		Northern Premier League Division One Midlands; 22 clubs – 2p, 4r		Southern League Division One Central; 22 clubs – 2p, 4r		Southern League Division One South; 22 clubs – 2p, 4r		Isthmian League Division One South Central; 22 clubs – 2p, 4r		Isthmian League Division One North; 22 clubs – 2p, 4r		Isthmian League Division One South East; 22 clubs – 2p, 4r	
9 (Step 5)	321	Northern League Division One; 22 clubs — 2p, 2r	Northern Counties East League Premier Division; 20 clubs — 2p, 2r	North West Counties League Premier Division; 20 clubs — 2p, 2r	Midland League Premier Division; 20 clubs — 2p, 2r	United Counties League Premier Division North; 18 clubs — 2p, 2r	United Counties League Premier Division South; 20 clubs — 2p, 2r	Hellenic League Premier Division; 21 clubs — 2p, 2r	Spartan South Midlands League Premier Division; 20 clubs — 2p, 2r	Wessex League Premier Division; 22 clubs — 2p, 2r	Western League Premier Division; 20 clubs — 2p, 2r	Combined Counties League Premier Division North; 20 clubs — 2p, 2r	Combined Counties League Premier Division South; 20 clubs — 2p, 2r	Eastern Counties League Premier Division; 20 clubs — 2p, 2r	Essex Senior League; 20 clubs — 2p, 2r	Southern Combination League Premier Division; 20 clubs — 2p, 2r	Southern Counties East League Premier Division; 18 clubs — 2p, 2r
10 (Step 6)	340	Northern League Division Two – 20 clubs — 2p, 0–3r; Northern Counties East League League Division One – 22 clubs — 2p, 0–3r; North West Counties League Division One North – 22 clubs — 2p, 0–3r; North West Counties League Division One South – 20 clubs — 2p, 0–3r; Midland League Division One – 22 clubs — 2p, 0–3r; United Counties League Division One – 22 clubs — 2p, 0–3r; Hellenic League Division One – 18 clubs — 2p, 0–3r; Spartan South Midlands League Division One – 19 clubs — 2p, 0–3r								Wessex League Division One – 20 clubs — 2p, 0–3r; Western League Division One – 18 clubs — 2p, 0–3r; South West Peninsula League Premier Division East – 17 clubs — 1p, 0–3r; South West Peninsula League Premier Division West – 18 clubs — 1p, 0–3r; Combined Counties League Division One – 22 clubs — 2p, 0–3r; Eastern Counties League Division One North – 20 clubs — 2p, 0–3r; Eastern Counties League Division One South – 22 clubs — 2p, 0–3r; Southern Combination League Division One – 20 clubs — 2p, 0–3r; Southern Counties East League Division One – 18 clubs — 2p, 0–3r							
11 (Step 7 – Regional Feeder League)	797	Anglian Combination Premier Division – 16 clubs; Bedfordshire County League Premier Division – 15 clubs; Cambridgeshire County League Premier Division – 15 clubs; Central Midlands Alliance Premier Division North – 17 clubs; Central Midlands Alliance Premier Division South – 17 clubs; Cheshire League Premier Division – 16 clubs; Devon Football League – 17 clubs; Dorset Premier League – 17 clubs; Essex Alliance League Senior Division – 16 clubs; Essex & Suffolk Border League Premier Division – 17 clubs; Essex Olympian League Premier Division – 16 clubs; Gloucestershire County League – 15 clubs; Hampshire Premier League Senior Division – 17 clubs; Hellenic League Alliance Division – 11 clubs; Herefordshire Football League Premier Division – 15 clubs; Hertfordshire Senior County League Premier Division – 14 clubs; Humber Premier League Premier Division – 14 clubs; Kent County League Premier Division – 18 clubs; Leicestershire Senior League Premier Division – 16 clubs; Lincolnshire Football League Premier Division – 14 clubs; Liverpool County Premier League Premier Division – 16 clubs; Manchester League Premier Division – 16 clubs; Midland League Division Two – 16 clubs; Mid-Sussex League Premier Division – 14 clubs; Middlesex County League Premier Division – 17 clubs; Northamptonshire Combination League Premier Division – 16 clubs; Northern Alliance Premier Division – 17 clubs; North Riding League Premier Division – 13 clubs; Nottinghamshire Senior League Senior Division – 18 clubs; Oxfordshire Senior League Premier Division – 14 clubs; Peterborough & District League Premier Division – 16 clubs; Sheffield & Hallamshire County Senior League Premier Division – 16 clubs; Shropshire County Football League Premier Division – 16 clubs; Somerset County League Premier Division – 16 clubs; Southern Combination League Division Two – 15 clubs; Spartan South Midlands League Division Two – 19 clubs; St Piran League Premier Division East – 16 clubs; St Piran League Premier Division West – 16 clubs; Staffordshire County Senior League Premier Division – 19 clubs; Suffolk & Ipswich League Premier Division – 17 clubs; Surrey Premier County Football League – 16 clubs; Thames Valley Premier League Premier Division – 16 clubs; Wearside League Premier Division – 17 clubs; West Cheshire League Division One – 15 clubs; West Lancashire League Premier Division – 16 clubs; West Midlands (Regional) League Premier Division – 18 clubs; West Yorkshire League Premier Division – 15 clubs; Wiltshire Senior League Premier Division – 18 clubs; York League Premier Division – 14 clubs; Yorkshire Amateur League Supreme Division – 16 clubs															

The system is only defined as far as level 11. What follows is a notional structure, based on which leagues usually promote and relegate to each other, although there are generally no defined rules for this and promotion to a higher league may be based on application rather than necessarily by virtue of finishing in a specific position in the lower division.

Level	Total clubs (4357)	League(s) / division(s)
12	892	Anglian Combination Division One – 16 clubs; Aylesbury and District League Premier Division – 9 clubs; Bedfordshire County League Division One – 13 clubs; Bristol Premier Combination Premier Division – 13 clubs; Bristol & Suburban League Premier Division – 12 clubs; Cambridgeshire County League Senior A Division – 10 clubs; Central Midlands Alliance Division One North – 9 clubs; Central Midlands Alliance Division One South – 11 clubs; Central Midlands Alliance Division One Central – 13 clubs; Cheshire League Division One – 16 clubs; Devon & Exeter League Premier Division – 14 clubs; Dorset League Senior Division – 12 clubs; East Berkshire Football League Premier – 10 clubs; East Riding County League Premier Division – 14 clubs; East Sussex League Premier Division – 8 clubs; Essex Alliance League Premier Division East – 13 clubs; Essex Alliance League Premier Division West – 12 clubs; Essex & Suffolk Border League Division One – 13 clubs; Essex Olympian League Senior Division One – 12 clubs; Gloucestershire Northern Senior League Division One – 14 clubs; Hampshire Premier League Division One – 14 clubs; Herefordshire Football League Division One – 14 clubs; Hertfordshire Senior County League Division One – 12 clubs; Kent County League Division One Central & East – 14 clubs; Kent County League Division One West – 14 clubs; Leicestershire Senior League Division One – 16 clubs; Liverpool County Premier League Championship Division – 11 clubs; Manchester League Division One – 16 clubs; Mid-Sussex League Championship – 10 clubs; Middlesex County League Division One Central – 10 clubs; Middlesex County League Division One East – 11 clubs; Middlesex County League Division One West – 11 clubs; Midland League Division Three – 15 clubs; North Bucks & District League Premier Division – 12 clubs; North Devon League Premier Division – 15 clubs; North Riding League Division One – 12 clubs; Northamptonshire Combination League Division One – 14 clubs; Northern Alliance First Division – 15 clubs; Nottinghamshire Senior League Division One – 15 clubs; Oxfordshire Senior League Division One – 14 clubs; Peterborough & District League Division One – 15 clubs; Sheffield & Hallamshire County Senior League Division One – 13 clubs; Shropshire County Football League Division One – 18 clubs; Somerset County League Division One – 15 clubs; South Devon Football League Premier Division – 12 clubs; St Piran League Division One East – 16 clubs; St Piran League Division One West – 15 clubs; Staffordshire County Senior League Division One– 11 clubs; Suffolk & Ipswich League Championship – 13 clubs; Surrey County Intermediate League (Western) Premier Division – 13 clubs; Surrey South Eastern Combination Intermediate Division One – 12 clubs; Swindon & District League Premier Division – 11 clubs; Thames Valley Premier League Division One – 12 clubs; Trowbridge & District League Division One – 12 clubs; Wearside League Division One – 14 clubs; West Cheshire League Division Two – 15 clubs; West Lancashire League Division One – 17 clubs; West Midlands (Regional) League Division One – 12 clubs; West Sussex League Premier Division – 11 clubs; West Yorkshire League Division One – 13 clubs; Wiltshire Senior League Division One – 15 clubs; York League Division One – 13 clubs; Yorkshire Amateur League Premier Division – 15 clubs
13	807	Anglian Combination Division Two – 15 clubs; Aylesbury and District League Division One – 13 clubs; Banbury District and Lord Jersey FA Premier Division – 9 clubs; Basingstoke and District League Saturday League Division One – 7 clubs; Beckett Football League Division One – 9 clubs; Bedfordshire County League Division Two – 12 clubs; Bristol Premier Combination Division One – 11 clubs; Bristol and Suburban League Senior Division – 11 clubs; Cambridgeshire County League Senior B Division – 14 clubs; Central Midlands Alliance Division Two – 12 clubs; Cheshire League League Two – 16 clubs; Coventry Alliance Football League Premier Division – 11 clubs; Craven and District League Premier Division – 11 clubs; Devon and Exeter League Division One – 12 clubs; Dorset League Division One – 10 clubs; East Lancashire Football League Premier Division 12 Clubs; East Berkshire Football League Division One – 12 clubs; East Riding County League Championship – 14 clubs; East Sussex League Division One – 9 clubs; Essex Alliance League Division One East – 11 clubs; Essex Alliance League Division One West – 11 clubs; Essex & Suffolk Border League Division Two – 12 clubs; Essex Olympian League Division Two – 11 clubs; Gloucestershire Northern Senior League Division Two – 15 clubs; Guildford and Woking Alliance League Premier Division – 9 clubs; Herefordshire Football League Division Two – 12 clubs; Hertfordshire Senior County League Division Two – 13 clubs; Isle of Wight Saturday League Division One – 11 clubs; Kent County League Division Two Central & East – 11 clubs; Kent County League Division Two West – 11 clubs; Leicestershire Senior League Division Two – 13 clubs; Liverpool County Premier League Conference Division – 15 clubs; Manchester League Division Two – 13 clubs; Middlesex County League Division Two – 10 clubs; Mid-Sussex League Division One North – 11 clubs; Mid-Sussex League Division One South – 11 clubs; North Berks League Division One – 9 clubs; North Bucks and District League Intermediate Division – 12 clubs; North Devon League Senior Division – 16 clubs; North Riding League Division Two – 16 clubs; Northamptonshire Combination League Division Two – 13 clubs; Northern Alliance Division Two – 15 clubs; Nottinghamshire Senior League Division Two – 12 clubs; Oxfordshire Senior League Division Two – 14 clubs; Peterborough and District League Division Two – 15 clubs; Sheffield & Hallamshire County Senior League Division Two – 14 clubs; Somerset County League Division Two – 15 clubs; South Devon Football League Division One – 12 clubs; Southampton Saturday League Premier Division – 10 clubs; St Piran League Division Two East – 13 clubs; St Piran League Division Two West – 13 clubs; Staffordshire County Senior League Division Two North – 12 clubs; Staffordshire County Senior League Division Two South & Central – 9 clubs; Suffolk and Ipswich League Division Two – 14 clubs; Surrey South Eastern Combination Intermediate Division Two – 12 clubs; Swindon & District League Division One – 11 clubs; Thames Valley Premier League Division Two – 11 clubs; Trowbridge & District League Division Two – 11 clubs; Wearside League Division Two – 13 clubs; West Cheshire League Division Three – 15 clubs; West Lancashire League Division Two – 19 clubs; West Sussex League Division One North – 10 clubs; West Sussex League Division One South – 8 clubs; West Yorkshire League Division Two – 15 clubs; Witney and District League Premier Division – 11 clubs; York League Division Two – 13 clubs; Yorkshire Amateur League Championship Division – 11 clubs
14	756	Anglian Combination Division Three North – 14 clubs; Anglian Combination Division Three South – 15 clubs; Aylesbury and District League Division Two – 13 clubs; Banbury District and Lord Jersey FA Division One – 9 clubs; Basingstoke and District League Saturday League Division Two – 8 clubs; Beckett Football League Division Two – 12 clubs; Bedfordshire County League Division Three – 14 clubs; Brighton, Worthing & District League Division One – 10 clubs; Bristol and District League Senior Division – 12 clubs; Bristol and Suburban Association League Division One – 12 clubs; Cambridgeshire County League Division One A – 13 clubs; Cambridgeshire County League Division One B – 10 clubs; Cheltenham League Premier Division – 9 clubs; Cheshire League Third Division – 11 clubs; Chester and Wirral League Premier Division – 8 clubs; Coventry Alliance Division One – 10 clubs; Craven and District League Division One – 13 clubs; Devon and Exeter League Division Two – 11 clubs; Doncaster Saturday League Premier Division – 9 clubs; Dorset League Division Two – 11 clubs; East Lancashire Football League Divsion One – 12 Clubs; East Riding County League Division One – 12 clubs; East Sussex League Division Two – 8 clubs; Essex Alliance League Division Two East – 11 clubs; Essex Alliance League Division Two West – 11 clubs; Essex & Suffolk Border League Division Three North – 12 clubs; Essex & Suffolk Border League Division Three South – 12 clubs; Essex Olympian League Division Three North West – 12 clubs; Essex Olympian League Division Three South East – 11 clubs; Furness Premier League Premier Division – 12 clubs; Guildford and Woking Alliance League Division One – 6 clubs; Halifax and District League Premier Division – 10 clubs; Hertfordshire Senior County League Division Three – 14 clubs; Hope Valley Amateur League Premier Division – 8 clubs; Huddersfield and District Association League Premier Division – 10 clubs; Isle of Wight Saturday League Division Two – 10 clubs; Lancashire Amateur League Premier Division – 13 clubs; Leicestershire County League Premier Division – 13 clubs; Liverpool Football League Premier Division – 13 clubs; Manchester League Division Three – 14 clubs; Middlesex County League Division Three – 10 clubs; Mid-Sussex Football League Division Two North – 11 clubs; Mid-Sussex Football League Division Two South – 11 clubs; North Berks League Division Two – 8 clubs; North Bucks and District League Division One – 12 clubs; North Devon League Intermediate Division One – 13 clubs; North Gloucestershire League Premier Division – 12 clubs; Northamptonshire Combination League Division Three – 13 clubs; Northern Alliance Division Three – 13 clubs; Nottinghamshire Senior League Division Three – 15 clubs; Oxfordshire Senior League Division Three – 14 clubs; Peterborough and District League Division Three – 13 clubs; Somerset County League Division Three – 15 clubs; South Devon Football League Division Two – 12 clubs; St Piran League Division Three East – 11 clubs; St Piran League Division Three West – 14 clubs; Stroud and District League Division One – 12 clubs; Suffolk and Ipswich League Division Three – 12 clubs; Thames Valley Premier League Division Three – 10 clubs; Wakefield and District League Premier Division – 8 clubs; Wearside League Division Three – 15 clubs; West Sussex League Division Two North – 10 clubs; West Sussex League Division Two South – 10 clubs; Wimbledon Kingston Football League Premiership – 11 clubs; Witney and District League Division One – 10 clubs; York League Division Three – 11 clubs; Yorkshire Amateur League Division One – 11 clubs
15	723	Anglian Combination Division Four North – 13 clubs; Anglian Combination Division Four South – 12 clubs; Ashford & District League Premier Division – 7 clubs; Basingstoke and District League Saturday League Division Three – 8 clubs; Bedfordshire County League Division Four – 14 clubs; Bristol and District League Division One – 10 clubs; Bristol and Suburban Association Football League Division Two – 12 clubs; Bromley & South London District League Premier Division – 9 clubs; Cambridgeshire County Football League Division Two A – 12 clubs; Cambridgeshire County Football League Division Two B – 12 clubs; Cambridgeshire County Football League Division Two C – 12 clubs; Canterbury & District League Premier Division – 8 clubs; Cheltenham League Division One – 12 clubs; Chester and Wirral League Championship – 10 clubs; Coventry Alliance Division Two – 9 clubs; Craven and District League Division Two – 12 clubs; Cumberland County League Premier Division – 10 clubs; Devon and Exeter Football League Division Three – 11 clubs; Dorset Football League Division Three – 11 clubs; East Riding County League Division Two – 12 clubs; East Sussex Football League Division Three – 10 clubs; Essex Alliance League Division Three – 7 clubs; Essex Olympian League Senior Division Four North West – 12 clubs; Essex Olympian League Senior Division Four South East – 11 clubs; Essex & Suffolk Border League Division Four North – 14 clubs; Essex & Suffolk Border League Division Four South – 14 clubs; Furness Premier League Division One – 11 clubs; Guildford and Woking Alliance League Division Two – 10 clubs; Hertfordshire Senior County League Division Four – 11 clubs; Huddersfield and District Association Football League Division One – 11 clubs; Lancashire Amateur League Division One – 11 clubs; Lancashire and Cheshire Amateur League Division One – 11 clubs; Leicestershire County League Championship Division – 13 clubs; Liverpool Football League Championship – 13 clubs; Manchester League Division Four – 14 clubs; Mid-Lancashire Football League Premier Division – 12 clubs; Mid-Sussex Football League Division Three North – 10 clubs; Mid-Sussex Football League Division Three South – 10 clubs; Mid-Somerset Football League Premier Division – 9 clubs; North East Combination League Premier Division – 8 clubs; North Gloucestershire League Division One – 11 clubs; Oxfordshire Senior League Division Four – 14 clubs; Perry Street and District League Premier Division – 9 clubs; Peterborough and District Football League Division Four – 14 clubs; Rochester and District League Premier Division – 11 clubs; Sevenoaks and District Football League Premier Division – 11 clubs; South Devon Football League Division Three – 12 clubs; St Piran League Division Four East – 12 clubs; St Piran League Division Four West – 12 clubs; Stroud and District League Division Two – 14 clubs; Suffolk and Ipswich League Division Four – 13 clubs; Taunton & District Saturday League Premier Division – 9 clubs; Thames Valley Premier Football League Division Four – 11 clubs; Wakefield and District League Division One – 13 clubs; West Sussex League Division Three North – 10 clubs; West Sussex League Division Three South – 10 clubs; Westmorland Association Football League Division One – 12 clubs; Weston-super-Mare and District Football League Division One – 12 clubs; Wimbledon Kingston Football League Championship – 10 clubs; Witney and District League Division Two – 13 clubs; Yeovil and District League Premier Division – 9 clubs; Yorkshire Amateur League Division Two – 11 clubs
16	503	Ashford & District League Division One – 9 clubs; Bristol and District League Division Two – 11 clubs; Bristol and Suburban Association Football League Division Three – 10 clubs; Bromley & South London District League Division One – 9 clubs; Cambridgeshire County Football League Division Three A – 12 clubs; Cambridgeshire County Football League Division Three B – 12 clubs; Cambridgeshire County Football League Division Three C – 12 clubs; Canterbury & District League Division One – 5 clubs; Central and South Norfolk League; Cheltenham League Division Two – 13 clubs; Cumberland County League Division One – 11 clubs; Devon and Exeter Football League Division Four – 12 clubs; Dorset Football League Division Four – 11 clubs; East Riding County League Division Three – 13 clubs; Essex Olympian League Division Five North West – 13 clubs; Essex Olympian League Division Five South East – 13 clubs; Furness Premier League Division Two – 12 clubs; Guildford and Woking Alliance League Division Three – 10 clubs; Hertfordshire Senior County League Division Five – 13 clubs; Huddersfield and District Association Football League Division Two – 10 clubs; Lancashire Amateur League Division Two – 9 clubs; Lancashire and Cheshire Amateur League Division Two – 13 clubs; Leicestershire County League Division One – 10 clubs; Liverpool Football League Division One – 10 clubs; Lowestoft & District League Division One – 14 clubs; Mid-Essex League Premier Division – 11 clubs; Mid-Lancashire Football League Division One – 14 clubs; Mid-Sussex Football League Division Four North – 11 clubs; Mid-Sussex Football League Division Four South – 12 clubs; Mid-Somerset Football League Division One – 9 clubs; North East Combination League Division One – 9 clubs; North Gloucestershire League Division Two – 11 clubs; Perry Street and District League Division One – 12 clubs; Rochester and District League Division One – 12 clubs; Sevenoaks and District Football League Division One – 12 clubs; South Devon Football League Division Four – 10 clubs; Stroud and District League Division Three North – 11 clubs; Stroud and District League Division Three South – 11 clubs; Suffolk and Ipswich League Division Five – 11 clubs; Taunton & District Saturday League Division One – 10 clubs; Westmorland Association Football League Division Two – 13 clubs; Weston-super-Mare and District Football League Division Two – 12 clubs; Wimbledon Kingston Football League Division One – 10 clubs; Witney and District League Division Three North – 13 clubs; Witney and District League Division Three South – 13 clubs; Yeovil and District League Division One – 13 clubs; Yorkshire Amateur League Division Three – 12 clubs
17	406	Bristol and District League Division Three – 8 clubs; Bristol and Suburban Association Football League Division Four – 10 clubs; Bromley & South London District League Division Two – 9 clubs; Central and South Norfolk League Division One – 11 clubs; Dorset Football League Division Five – 10 clubs; Devon and Exeter Football League Division Five – 12 clubs; East Riding County League Division Four – 11 clubs; Guildford and Woking Alliance League Youth to Adult Transition Division – 11 clubs; Hertfordshire Senior County League Division Six – 10 clubs; Huddersfield and District Association Football League Division Three – 11 clubs; Lancashire Amateur League Division Three – 11 clubs; Lancashire and Cheshire Amateur League Division Three – 12 clubs; Leicestershire County League Division Two – 9 clubs; Lowestoft & District League Division Two; Mid-Essex League Division One – 12 clubs; Mid-Lancashire Football League Division Two – 14 clubs; Mid-Sussex Football League Division Five Central – 10 clubs; Mid-Sussex Football League Division Five North – 10 clubs; Mid-Sussex Football League Division Five South – 10 clubs; Mid-Somerset Football League Division Two – 8 clubs; North East Norfolk League Division One – 12 clubs; North Gloucestershire League Division Three – 12 clubs; North West Norfolk League Division One – 8 clubs; Perry Street and District League Division Two – 14 clubs; Rochester and District League Division Two – 12 clubs; Sevenoaks and District Football League Division Two – 12 clubs; South Devon Football League Division Five – 10 clubs; Stroud and District League Division Four North – 11 clubs; Stroud and District League Division Four South – 11 clubs; Taunton & District Saturday League Division Two – 12 clubs; Westmorland Association Football League Division Three – 14 clubs; Weston-super-Mare and District Football League Division Three – 12 clubs; Wimbledon Kingston Football League Division Two – 9 clubs; Yeovil and District League Division Two – 11 clubs; Yorkshire Amateur League Division Four – 11 clubs
18	193	Bristol and District League Division Four – 12 clubs; Central and South Norfolk League Division Two – 11 clubs; Devon and Exeter Football League Division Six Brown – 12 clubs; Devon and Exeter Football League Division Six Davey – 11 clubs; Devon and Exeter Football League Division Six Webb – 12 clubs; Dorset Football League Division Six – 10 clubs; East Riding County League Division Five – 12 clubs; Huddersfield and District Association Football League Division Four – 11 clubs; Lancashire Amateur League Division Four – 12 clubs; Lancashire and Cheshire Amateur League Division A – 11 clubs; Leicestershire County League Division Three – 10 clubs; Lowestoft & District League Division Three; Mid-Essex League Division Two – 12 clubs; North East Norfolk League Division Two – 10 clubs; North West Norfolk League Division Two – 11 clubs; Sevenoaks and District Football League Division Three – 9 clubs; Stroud and District League Division Five North – 9 clubs; Stroud and District League Division Five South – 11 clubs; Westmorland Association Football League Division Four – 14 clubs; Weston-super-Mare and District Football League Division Four – 9 clubs; Yorkshire Amateur League Division Five – 10 clubs
19	42	Central and South Norfolk League Division Three – 11 clubs; Huddersfield and District Association Football League Division Five – 13 clubs; Lancashire and Cheshire Amateur League Division B – 12 clubs; Yorkshire Amateur Football League Division Six – 11 clubs
20	12	Yorkshire Amateur League Division Seven – 12 clubs

== See also ==
- League system
- List of association football competitions
- National League System (the system involving the 5th–10th tiers of English football, organised by the FA)
- History of the English non-League football system
- English women's football league system
