= Church of All Saints, Elland =

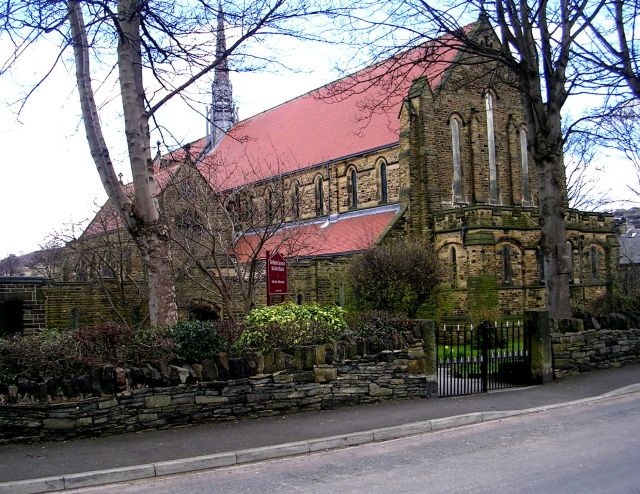
- Church of All Saints, Elland
- 53.6805°N 1.8388°W
- OS grid reference: SE 10750 20462
- Location: Savile Road, Elland, West Yorkshire, HX5 0NH
- Country: England
- Denomination: Church of England
- Churchmanship: Modern Catholic

History
- Status: Active
- Dedication: All Saints

Architecture
- Functional status: Parish church
- Heritage designation: Grade II* listed
- Years built: 1896

Administration
- Diocese: Diocese of Leeds
- Archdeaconry: Archdeaconry of Halifax
- Parish: All Saints, Elland

Clergy
- Bishop: The Rt Revd Tony Robinson (AEO)
- Rector: The Revd Canon David Burrows

The Church of All Saints is a Church of England parish church in Elland, Calderdale, West Yorkshire, England. The church is a grade II* listed building.

== History ==
In 1896, the Church of All Saints was built by George Fellowes Prynne. It is made of hammer-dressed stone and has a tiled roof. It has late Gothic reredos dating from the 1920s, although the carved altar is from the 17th century. Prynne's brother, the leading late Pre-Raphaelite painter Edward Arthur Fellowes Prynne, designed the church's stained glass. On 6 June 1983, the church was designated a grade II* listed building.

=== Present day ===
The Church of All Saints is part of the Benefice of "Saint Mary the Virgin, Elland and All Saints, Elland" in the Archdeaconry of Halifax and the Huddersfield Episcopal Area of the Diocese of Leeds.

The parish stands in the Modern Catholic tradition of the Church of England. As All Saints rejects the ordination of women, the church receives alternative episcopal oversight from the Bishop of Wakefield (currently Tony Robinson).

== Notable people ==
- Felix Arnott, later Archbishop of Brisbane, served his curacy in the benefice in the 1930s

== See also ==
- Grade II* listed buildings in Calderdale
- Listed buildings in Elland
