= Felix Arnott =

- Born: Felix Raymond Arnott; 8 March 1911; Ipswich, Suffolk
- Died: 27 July 1988 (aged 77); Taigum, Brisbane
- Occupation: Archbishop

Felix Raymond Arnott CMG, Th.D., M.A., B.A. (8 March 1911 – 27 July 1988) was an Australian Archbishop of the Anglican Diocese of Brisbane.

== Early life and education ==
He was born on 8 March 1911 and educated at Ipswich School and Keble College, Oxford.

== Career ==
Ordained after a period of study at Ripon College Cuddesdon in 1934, his first post was a curacy in the parish of All Saints and St Mary, Elland (1934–38). After that he was chaplain to the Bishop of Wakefield (1936–39), during which he was also Vice-Principal of Bishops' College, Cheshunt (1938–39). He was then Warden of St John's College, Brisbane (1939–46). From 1946 to 1963, he held a similar post at St. Paul's College, Sydney, where he was also a lecturer in ecclesiastical history at the University of Sydney. In 1963, he became coadjutor Bishop of Anglican Diocese of Melbourne: he was consecrated a bishop on St Peter's Day 1963 at St Andrew's Cathedral, Sydney. In 1970, he became Archbishop of Brisbane and Metropolitan of Queensland, posts he held for a decade. On retirement in 1980 he was then Honorary Chaplain in Venice for two years.

Arnott was appointed a Companion of the Order of St Michael and St George (CMG) in the 1981 Birthday Honours.

He died on 27 July 1988, and was survived by his wife Anne.

Religious titles
Preceded by Philip Strong	Archbishop of Brisbane; 1970–1980	Succeeded by John Grindrod
