= Marsden F.C. =

Football club in West Yorkshire, England

Marsden
- Full name: Marsden Football Club
- Nickname: The Cuckoos
- Founded: 1907; 119 years ago as Marsden United
- Ground: Fall Lane
- Coordinates: 53.5988°N 1.9275°W
- League: Yorkshire Amateur League; Supreme Division (2025-26)
colours

Marsden Football Club are an English association football club based in Marsden, West Yorkshire. Founded in 1907 and known as The Cuckoos, their ground is at Fall Lane.

== History ==
Founded in 1907 as Marsden United, the club joined the Huddersfield and District Association Football League (HDAFL), a competition they won a number of times. They entered the Yorkshire Combination in 1913, but the competition disbanded the same season. The "United" was dropped in 1930, and between 1937 and 1971, Marsden F.C. competed in the South East Lancashire Amateur League and the West Riding County Amateur Football League (WRCAFL), regularly switching between the two. The 1950s were the club's heyday, during which they won 11 trophies.

Marsden played in the 1950–51 FA Cup, beating Meltham 3–2 in the extra preliminary round, before losing 2–0 to Yorkshire Amateur in the preliminary round.

In 1971, Marsden rejoined the HDAFL, but by the early 1980s had dropped to its bottom, fifth division. To address the slump, the club merged with Marsden Old Boys' FC, meaning the village had a single, unified club. In 1986, Marsden FC moved into a new clubhouse on Fall Lane. Marsden went on to win the WRCAFL in 1994 and 1998. However, by 2016, the club was facing the possibility of closure due to mounting debts. In 2019, they resigned from the HDAFL and did not field a men's team.

Marsden returned to league football following the COVID-19 pandemic. In 2023–24, they played in and won the Yorkshire Amateur League Championship division, winning promotion to the Supreme division for 2024–2025.

== Fall Lane ==
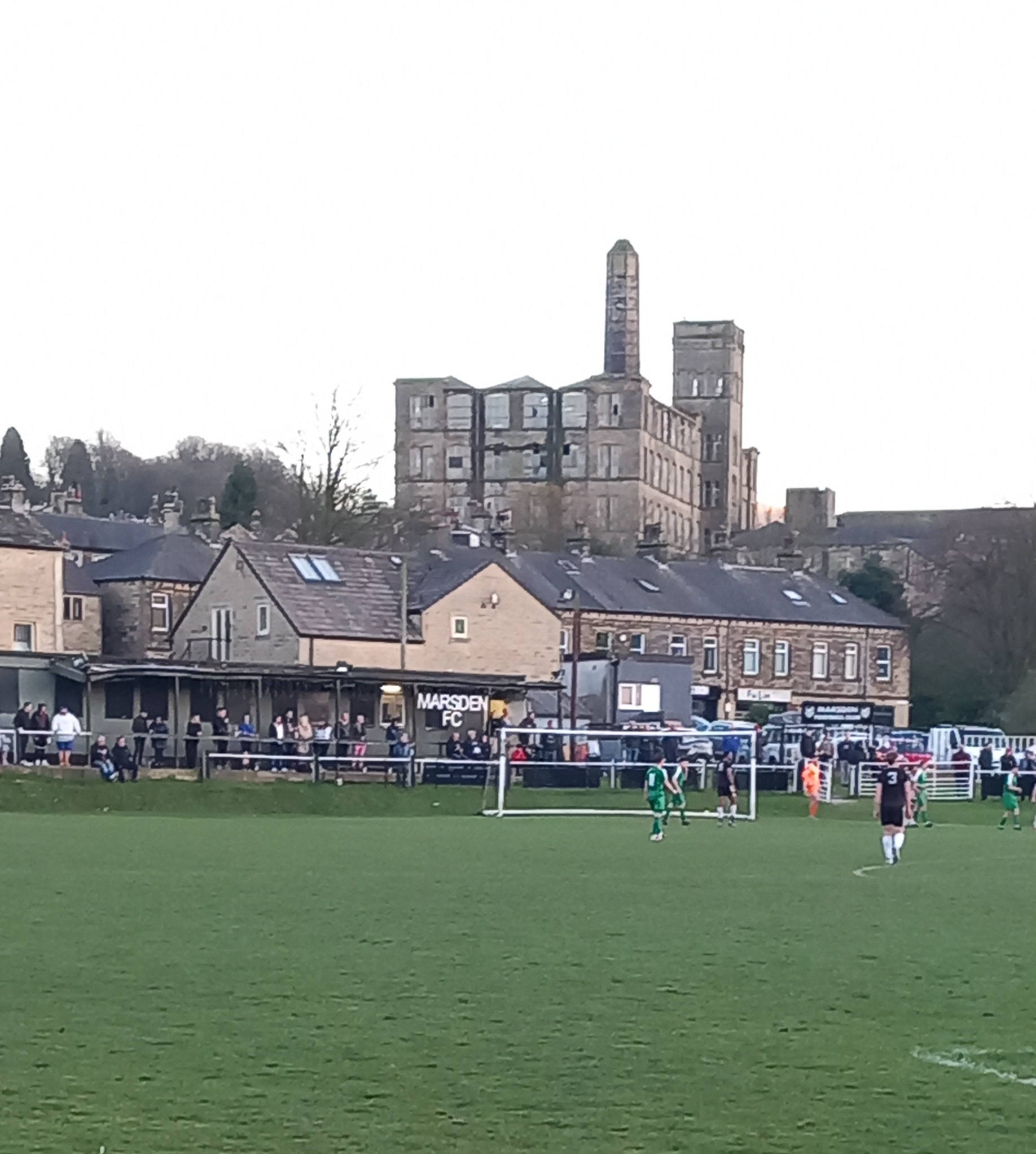

Marsden play their home games at Fall Lane. In the 2020 book British Football's Greatest Grounds by Mike Bayly, Fall Lane was voted one of the top grounds to visit in the country. Bayly writes:

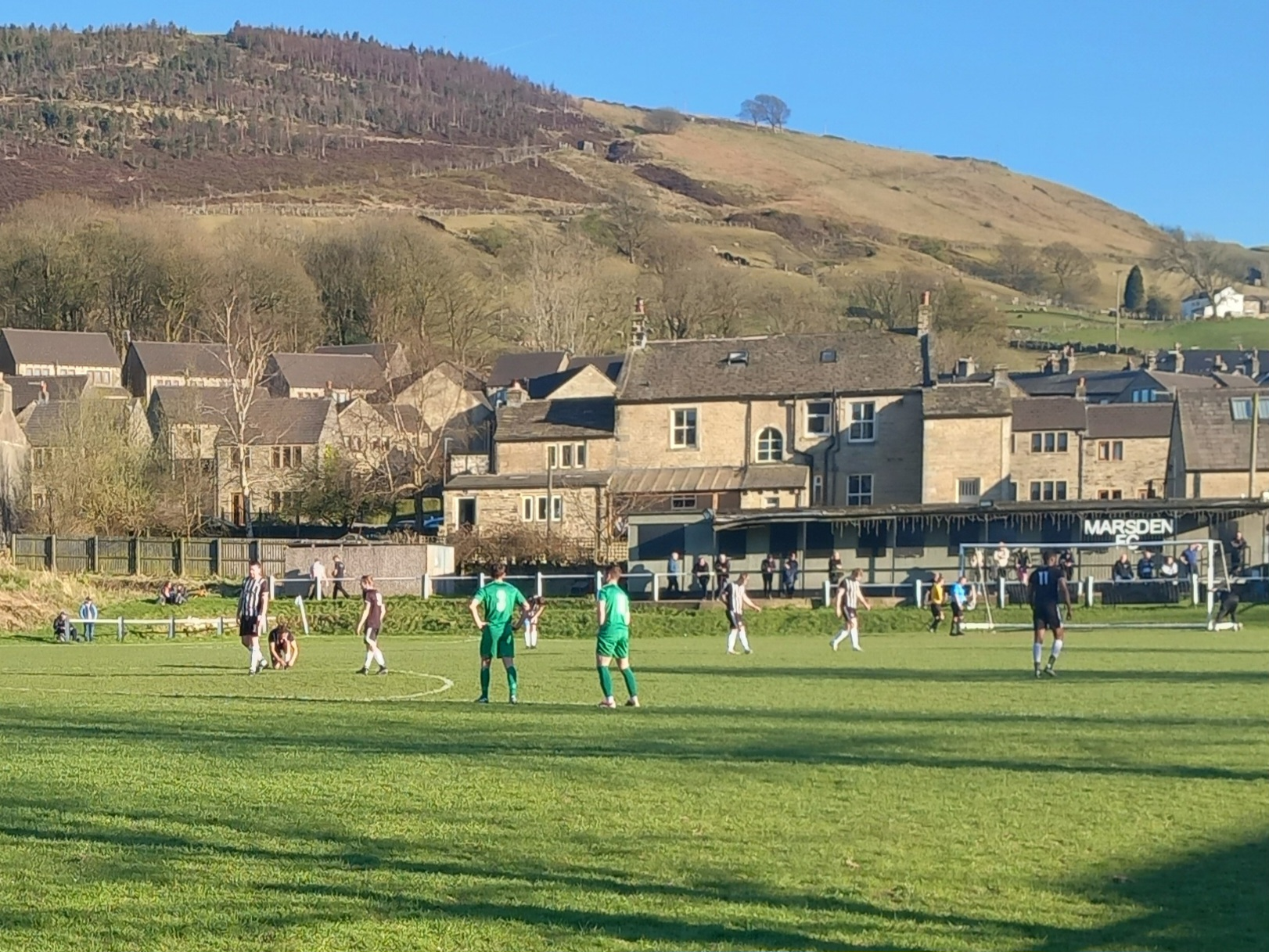

Cradled in the rugged slopes of the Colne Valley, Fall Lane encapsulates Marsden's remote transitional beauty. The ground also offers a glimpse of the region's former textile empire. Visible to the south is Bank Bottom Mill, a sleeping leviathan from an era when Marsden was a prosperous cloth-manufacturing centre.
