= Elland Town Hall =

Municipal building in Elland, West Yorkshire, England

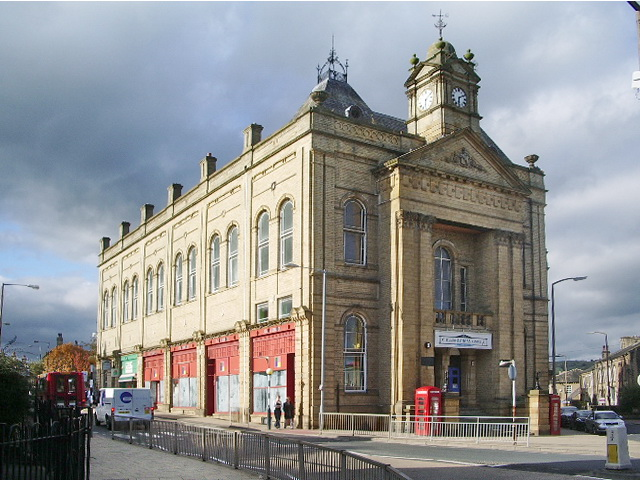
- Elland Town Hall

- Shown in West Yorkshire
- 53.6843°N 1.8350°W
- Location: Southgate, Elland

History
- Built: 1888

Site notes
- Architect: Charles Frederick Luke Horsfall
- Architectural style: Italianate style

Listed Building – Grade II
- Official name: The Old Town Hall and 1 to 11 Town Hall Buildings
- Designated: 13 May 1992
- Reference no.: 1248018

Elland Town Hall is a municipal building in Southgate, Elland, West Yorkshire, England. The structure, which was primarily used as an events venue, is a Grade II listed building.

== History ==
The first municipal building in the town was a small square building at the south end of Southgate which was completed in 1821. The building, which was known as the "Town's Room", was used as a lock-up and as an office for parish officials: it had an arched doorway, gothic windows and a sign above the doorway, quoting the Book of Proverbs Chapter 28, Clause 7, which read "whoso keeps the law is wise". The local board of health, which was established in November 1852, used the Town's Room as its regular meeting place.

In the early 1880s, the local board decided that the town needed an events venue capable of hosting large public events: the site they chose was directly opposite the old Town's Room. A design competition was won by Charles Frederick Luke Horsfall from Halifax. The foundation stone for the new building was laid on 21 June 1887. It was designed in the Italianate style, built in brown brick at a cost of £7,000 and was officially opened by the diplomat John Savile, of Rufford Abbey, on 19 September 1888. The design involved a symmetrical main frontage with three bays facing onto the corner of Southgate and Huddersfield Road; the central bay, which slightly projected forward, featured a flight of steps leading up to a pair of round headed doorways with keystones flanked by pairs of full-height Corinthian order pilasters supporting an entablature and a modillioned pediment with a coat of arms in the tympanum. The central bay also featured a prominent Venetian window with a balcony and a balustrade on the first floor, while the outer bays were fenestrated with round headed sash windows on both floors. The roof was enhanced by a pair of mansard pavilions and by a small central cupola with a weather vane. Internally, the principal room was the assembly hall which could accommodate 1,000 people.

Following significant population growth, largely associated with Elland's status as a market town, the area was advanced to the status of urban district in 1894. The new council chose to procure new council offices on a site just to the north of the town hall. In June 1909 a clock, by J. Smith & Sons, was installed in the cupola: it was a gift to the town from Lewis Mackrell, in memory of his father, James Mackrell, who had been the proprietor of a local engineering company.

The town hall continued to be used for concerts and public events but was converted for use as the Town Hall Cinema in October 1909. The building was renamed the Palladium Cinema in 1920 and continued to operate in that capacity until June 1959. It then operated for as a bingo hall until 1977 and subsequently as a snooker club, but had to be fully restored after being badly damaged in a fire in November 1994. It then functioned as a fitness centre before being returned to use as a banqueting facility. Meanwhile, the ground floor on the Southgate side of the building, which operated as a row of shops for much of the 20th century, has more recently been fitted out for restaurant use.

== See also ==
- Listed buildings in Elland
