= West Riding County Women's Football League =

West Riding County Women's Football League (WRCWFL)
- Founded: 2006
- Country: England
- Divisions: Premier Division; Division One; Division Two; Division Three; Division Four; Division Five; Division Six
- Number of clubs: 63; 10 (Premier Division); 10 (Division One); 9 (Division Two); 10 (Division Three); 9 (Division Four); 8 (Division Five); 7 (Division Six)
- Level on pyramid: 7 - 10
- Feeder to: North East Regional Women's League
- Current champions: Thackley (2025/26)
- Website: FA Full-time site

The West Riding County Women's Football League is an open aged (16 plus) Women's Association Football League in England affiliated to the West Riding FA.

The League is run by a number of Officials who are annually voted in by the member clubs spread across its 7 Divisions.

The League is at from level 7 of the Women's Football League Pyramid, and promotes to the North East Regional Women's Football League.

== 2019/20 Season ==
The season was brought to an abrupt end by the outbreak of the global pandemic COVID-19 and was declared null and void.

League leaders at the time Farsley Celtic Juniors Firsts were successful in their application for promotion to the next step of the Women's Football League Pyramid - The North East Regional Women's Football League, Harrogate Railway were relegated from Regional to the Premier Division.

Durkar Devils folded & Middleton Athletic departed the League for a more local competition.

Hemsworth Town, Sherburn White Rose & Leeds United added additional teams to the League, Leeds Union University added 2 teams when the University Leagues had opted not to run in 2020/21 & several new teams, Golcar United, Hall Green United, Hepworth United Development, Leeds Hyde Park, Old Centralians entered the League bringing the need for a Third Division to be reactivated to accommodate 42 teams.

Unfortunately Sherburn White Rose Reserves shortly after the start of the season 2020/21.

== 2025-26 Teams ==
=== Premier Division ===
Team	Home Ground
Forge Way	Batley Sports & Tennis Centre, Batley
Golcar United	Golcar United FC, Golcar
Harrogate Railway Firsts	Harrogate & District Railway Athletic Club, Harrogate
Knaresborough Town	Knaresborough Town FC, Knaresborough
Leeds Medics & Dentists	Sports Park Weetwood, Weetwood
Sherburn White Rose	Sherburn White Rose FC, Sherburn in Elmet
Silsden	Silsden AFC, Silsden
Skipton Firsts	Engine Shed Lane, Skipton
Thackley	Thackley AFC, Thackley
Wyke Wanderers	Wyke Community Sports Village, Wyke, Bradford

Location of the WRCWFL Premier Division Teams for the 2025-26 Season in West Yorkshire
Location of the WRCWFL Premier Division Teams for the 2025-26 Season in North Yorkshire

=== Division One ===
Club	Home Ground
Ackworth Girls	Oakfield Park School, Ackworth
Boroughbridge	Boroughbridge Sports Association, Boroughbridge
Bradford City U23	Carlton Bolling College, Bradford
Brayton Belles	Selby College, Selby
Field	Harrogate Road Playing Field, Bradford
Horsforth St Margarets Firsts	King Georges Playing Fields, Horsforth
Huddersfield Amateur Firsts	Old Earth, Elland
Leeds Hyde Park Firsts	Elida Gibbs Park, Leeds
Morley Town	Woodkirk Valley Country Club, Wakefield
Rangers Athletic	St John Fisher Voluntary Academy, Dewsbury

,
Location of the WRCWFL Division One clubs for the 2025-26 season in West Yorkshire
Location of the WRCWFL Division One clubs for the 2025-26 season in North Yorkshire

=== Second Division ===
Club	Home ground
Athletico	Bradford Academy, Bradford
Boroughbridge	Aldborough Road, Boroughbridge
Bradford City U21	Rawdon Meadows, Bradford
Burley Trojans	Wharfe Meadows, Otley
Garforth Rangers	Ninevah Lane, Allerton Bywater
Horsforth St Margarets	King George's Field, Horsforth
Knaresborough Town	Manse Lane, Knaresborough
Leeds City	Adel Sports & Social Club, Leeds
Queensbury Celtic	Pit Lane, Queensbury
Rangers Athletic	St John Fisher Academy, Dewsbury
Wortley	Oldfield Lane, Leeds

Location of the WRCWFL Second Division clubs for the 2023–24 season in West Yorkshire
Location of the WRCWFL Second Division clubs for the 2023–24 season in North Yorkshire

=== Third Division ===
Club	Home ground
Bradford United	Laistergate Lane, Bradford
Crofton Sports	The Sidings, Crofton
Field AFC	Chelsea Road, Bradford
Forge Way Reserves	Batley Sports Centre, Batley
Harrogate Railway Athletic Reserves	King James' School, Knaresborough
Huddersfield Amateur Reserves	Old Earth, Elland
Kinsley Boys	Tombridge Crescent, Kinsley
Leeds Hyde Park Seconds	Elida Gibbs Park, Leeds
Lower Hopton Development	Woodend Road, Mirfield
Pontefract Sports & Social	Harewood Avenue, Pontefract
Skipton Town Development	Engine Shed Lane, Skipton
Tyersal	Arkwright Street, Bradford

Location of the WRCWFL Third Division clubs for the 2023–24 season in West Yorkshire
Location of the WRCWFL Third Division clubs for the 2023–24 season in North Yorkshire

=== Fourth Division ===
Club	Home ground
Brighouse Town	Heffernan Utilities Stadium, Brighouse
Crossley Belles	Illingworth Sports Club, Halifax
Dewsbury Moor	Heckmondwike Road, Dewsbury
Eccleshill United	Plumpton Park, Bradford
Goole	Dunscroft Welfare Club, Hatfield
Halifax Friendly	Lightcliffe Academy, Halifax
Harrogate Town Reserves	Rossett Sports Centre, Harrogate
Ilkley Town Development	Ben Rhydding Sports Club, Ilkley
Pontefract Collieries	Beechnut Lane, Pontefract
Shadwell United	Bedquilts Recreation Ground, Leeds
Sherburn White Rose Development	Finkle Hill, Sherburn in Elmet

Location of the WRCWFL Fourth Division clubs for the 2023–24 season in West Yorkshire
Location of the WRCWFL Fourth Division clubs for the 2023–24 season in North Yorkshire
Location of the WRCWFL Fourth Division clubs for the 2023–24 season in South Yorkshire

== League & Cup history ==
League Division Champions/Runners-up
Season	Premier Division	Division One	Division Two	Division Three	Division Four	Division Five	Division Six
2025/26	Thackley Knaresborough Town		Guiseley Lionesses Firsts Leeds City		Eccleshill Lionesses Firsts Tadcaster Albion Firsts		
2024/25	Ilkley Town Firsts Wyke Wanderers	Thackley Knaresborough Town	Rangers Athletic Horsforth St Margarets Firsts	Eccleshill United Brighouse Town Firsts		Leeds Modernians Development Sherburn White Rose Development	n/a
2023/24	Leeds Modernians Leeds Medics & Dentists	Ilkley Town Firsts Farsley Celtic	Knaresborough Town Bradford City U21	Field Harrogate Railway Reserves	Eccleshill United Brighouse Town		n/a
2022/23	Lower Hopton Firsts Yorkshire Amateur	Skipton Town Firsts Sherburn White Rose Firsts	Leeds Hyde Park Firsts West Yorkshire	Farsley Celtic Burley Trojans	Knaresborough Town Bradford City U21		n/a
2021/22	Yorkshire Amateur Leeds Medics & Dentists	Leeds United U21 Morley Town	Hepworth United Development Hall Green United	West Yorkshire Brighouse Town Development	n/a	n/a	n/a
2020/21	n/a	n/a	n/a	n/a	n/a	n/a	n/a
2019/20	n/a	n/a	n/a	n/a	n/a	n/a	n/a
2018/19	Hepworth United Yorkshire Amateur	Thackley Firsts Ripon City	Farsley Celtic Juniors Firsts Ossett United Reserves	n/a	n/a	n/a	n/a
2017/18	Tingley Athletic Hepworth United	Farsley Celtic Reserves Ossett Town Firsts	Middleton Athletic Lower Hopton	Thackley Tyersal	n/a	n/a	n/a
2016/17	Leeds Medics & Dentists Hepworth United	Tingley Athletic Reserves Yorkshire Amateur	Clifton Rangers Dewsbury Rangers	Middleton Athletic Ripon City	n/a	n/a	n/a
2015/16	Altofts Tingley Athletic Firsts	Battyeford Firsts Silsden Firsts	Tingley Athletic Reserves Brighouse Town Development	Wigton Moor Dewsbury Rangers	n/a	n/a	n/a
2014/15	Harrogate Railway Athletic Hemsworth Miners Welfare	Tingley Athletic Firsts Hepworth United	Bradford City A Battyeford Firsts	Tingley Athletic Reserves Farsley Celtic Reserves	n/a	n/a	n/a
2013/14	Farsley Celtic Brighouse Athletic	Wortley Hemsworth Miners Welfare	Oulton Athletic Hebden Royd United	Bradford City A Wetherby Athletic Reserves	n/a	n/a	n/a
2012/13	Harrogate Railway Athletic Tingley Athletic	Farsley Celtic Silsden Firsts	Northowram Gledhow	Wortley Reserves Oulton Athletic	n/a	n/a	n/a
2011/12	Keighley Oaks Harrogate Railway Athletic	Tingley Athletic Pontefract Sports & Social	Altofts Rothwell Reserves	Huddersfield Town Reserves Wigton Moor	n/a	n/a	n/a
2010/11	Lepton Highlanders Kirklees	Keighley Oaks Brighouse Athletic	Castleford White Rose Reserves Wortley	n/a	n/a	n/a	n/a
2009/10	Leeds Vixens Lepton Highlanders	Ossett Town Hemsworth Miners Welfare	Brighouse Athletic Farsley Celtic	n/a	n/a	n/a	n/a

League Tournament Winners/Runners-up
Year	League Cup	Score	League Shield	Score	Supplementary Cup	Score
2026	Knaresborough Town Thackley	1-1 3-2 pens	Rangers Athletic Boroughbridge	2-1	n/a	n/a
2025	Thackley Wyke Wanderers	1-0	Bradford City U23 Goole	1-3	Boroughbridge (A) Horsforth St.Margaret's Reserves (B) Kellingley Welfare (C) Leeds Hyde Park Seconds (D)	n/a
2024	Leeds Modernians Sherburn White Rose Firsts	2-0	Bradford (Park Avenue) Golcar United	2-2 3-2 pens	n/a	n/a
2023	Yorkshire Amateur Farsley Celtic	3-0	Morley Town Athletico	9-0	n/a	n/a
2022	Lower Hopton Ossett United Development	6-0	n/a		n/a	n/a
2021	n/a		n/a		Yorkshire Amateur Ripon City	?-?
2020	n/a		n/a		n/a	
2019	Farsley Celtic Juniors Firsts Bradford Park Avenue	3-2	Brighouse Athletic Middleton Athletic	4-1	Leeds United Development Phoenix	3-2
2018	Ripon City Firsts Tingley Athletic	2-1	Hepworth United Wetherby Athletic	2-2 2-1 pens	Thackley Boroughbridge	6-0
2017	Middleton Athletic Yorkshire Amateur	2-2 3-2 pens	Leeds Medics & Dentists Hemsworth Miners Welfare	4-2	Wetherby Athletic Hepworth United	6-3
2016	Bradford City A Tingley Athletic Firsts	4-2	Silsden Firsts Hemsworth Miners Welfare	4-1	n/a	
2015	Harrogate Railway Athletic Tingley Athletic	4-1	Altofts Bradford City A	2-2 4-3 pens	Battyeford Firsts Leeds Medics & Dentists	3-3 5-4 pens
2014	Harrogate Railway Athletic Pontefract Sports & Social	3-2	Wetherby Athletic Reserves Bradford City A	4-2	n/a	
2013	Tingley Athletic Brighouse Athletic	?-?			n/a	
2012					n/a	
2011	Lepton Highlanders Brighouse Athletic	4-1	Brayton Belles Rothwell Town Reserves	3-1	n/a	
2010	Kirklees Brayton Belles	6-0	Dearne & District Ossett Town	6-2	n/a	
