= F.C. Farsley =

Association football club in Farsley, England

FC Farsley
- Full name: Farsley Celtic Football Club
- Founded: 1908 (original club)
- Ground: Throstle Nest, Farsley
- Capacity: 4,000 (300 seated)
- League: Yorkshire Amateur League Supreme Division
- 2025–26: Northern Counties East League Premier Division (resigned)
Home colours

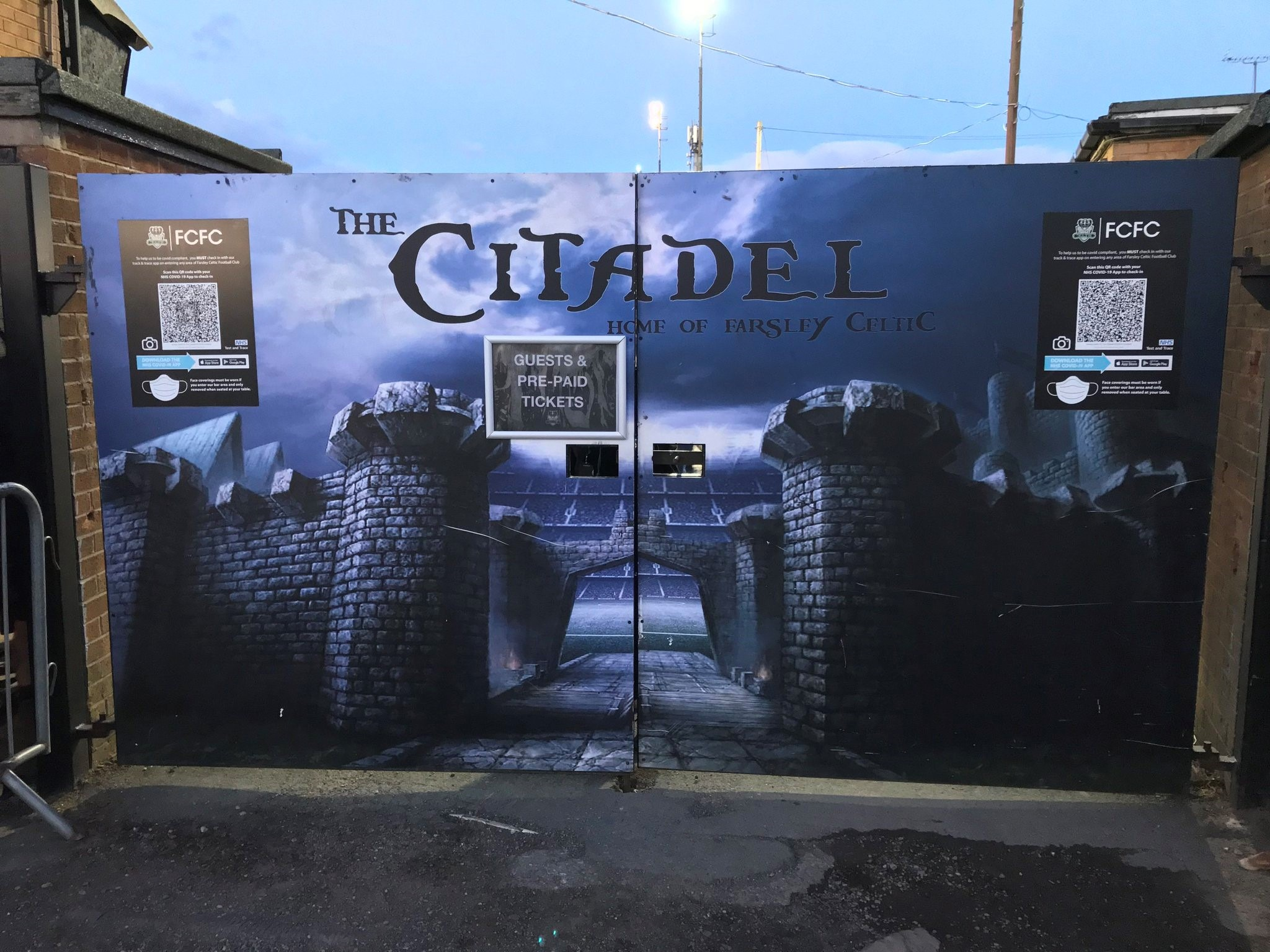
The gates to Throstle Nest

Last logo as Farsley Celtic before the 2025 liquidation

Football Club Farsley is a football club based in Farsley, West Yorkshire, England. They are currently members of the Yorkshire Amateur League Supreme Division and play at Throstle Nest.

The original Farsley Celtic club was founded in 1908. After folding in 2010, they were reformed as Farsley AFC before returning to the name Farsley Celtic in 2015. The club folded again in 2025, before being refounded as FC Farsley.

== History ==
The original Farsley Celtic was established in 1908 as Farsley Football Club and played in amateur leagues in Leeds. They joined the West Riding County Amateur League in 1926 and were runners-up in 1936–37. In 1949 they joined Division Two of the Yorkshire League. They won the division in 1951–52, earning promotion to Division One. After three consecutive bottom-half finishes, league performances improved and Farsley finished fifth in 1955–56 and fourth in 1956–57, before ending the season as runners-up in both 1957–58 and 1958–59. The 1959–60 season saw them win the league for the first time, and throughout the 1960s the club finished in the top seven of the league. They were champions again in 1968–69 and runners-up in 1970–71 and 1971–72. In 1974–75 the club reached the first round of the FA Cup for the first time, losing 2–0 at home to Third Division Tranmere Rovers in a match moved to Elland Road to accommodate the record 11,000 crowd. After finishing in the bottom four of Division One the following season, the club were relegated to Division Two. The following season saw them finish fourth in Division Two, earning promotion back to Division One. However, their stay in Division One only lasted one season as they were relegated again at the end of the 1977–78 season. After three years in Division Two they were promoted back to Division One at the end of the 1980–81 season.

In 1982 the Yorkshire League merged with the Midland League to form the Northern Counties East League, with Farsley placed in Division One North. They remained in the division until winning it in 1984–85, after which they were promoted to the Premier Division. In 1986–87 they were Premier Division runners-up, earning promotion to the newly formed Division One of the Northern Premier League. The club remained in the division for seventeen seasons until a third-place finish in 2003–04 saw them promoted to the Premier Division. Their first season in the Premier Division ended in controversy; Spennymoor United failed to fulfil their fixtures as they folded and the league opted to expunge their results, leaving Farsley ending the season as league champions. However, the Football Association over-ruled the league, awarding three points to all clubs who had not played Spennymoor at the time they had stopped playing. This meant that both Hyde United and Workington moved above Farsley in the table, with Hyde gaining automatic promotion. Farsley attempted to overturn the decision in the High Court, but were unsuccessful and subsequently entered the play-offs. After beating Whitby Town 1–0 in the semi-finals, they lost to Workington on penalties in the final.

In 2005–06 Farsley finished fourth in the Premier Division, again qualifying for the play-offs. After beating Marine 1–0 in the semi-finals, they defeated North Ferriby United 2–1 in the final to earn promotion to the Conference North. A second successive promotion was achieved the following season when a fifth-place finish in the Conference North saw them again qualify for the playoffs. They went on to beat Kettering Town 4–2 on aggregate in the semi-finals, before beating Hinckley United 4–3 in the final at the Pirelli Stadium. They also reached the first round of the FA Cup again, eventually losing 2–0 in a replay to Milton Keynes Dons after the home match had ended 0–0. The club's first season in the Conference National ended in relegation back to the Conference North. Financial problems led to the club being expelled from the league prior to the 2009–10 season, although they were readmitted shortly afterwards. However, they subsequently went into administration and were expelled from the Conference in March 2010 after being unable to fulfil their fixtures, before being disbanded on 10 March.

=== Second club ===
The club was reformed as Farsley A.F.C. and joined the Premier Division of the Northern Counties East League for the 2010–11 season. They went on to win the division, earning promotion to Division One North of the Northern Premier League. A fourth-place finish in 2011–12 saw them qualify for the play-offs, losing 3–0 to Witton Albion in the semi-finals. In 2015 the club returned to the name Farsley Celtic. They finished second in 2016–17, again qualifying for the play-offs. After beating Colne 4–0 in the semi-finals, the club defeated Ossett Town 4–2 in the final to earn promotion to the Premier Division. The following season saw the club finish fifth in the Premier Division, reaching the play-offs. However, they were beaten 2–1 in the semi-finals by Ashton United. In 2018–19 the club were Premier Division champions, earning promotion to the National League North.

In 2019 the club changed their playing colours from blue to green and white, adopted a new badge and renamed their ground following a takeover. Following relegation at the end of the 2024–25 season, financial instability caused by delays in installing a new pitch and having to play home games in Buxton for most of the season meant the club were not granted a license to compete in steps 1–4 for the following season and were instead placed in the Premier Division of the Northern Counties East League. The club subsequently withdrew from the Northern Counties East League, and although the women's, deaf, and development teams initially continued to operate, the club was liquidated on 18 December 2025.

=== Third club ===
FC Farsley was established by David Stockdale on the same day the former club was liquidated. The club applied to play at step 6 (tenth tier) or higher but agreed to join the Supreme Division of the Yorkshire Amateur Football League (eleventh tier). Stockdale also agreed to continue as the first team manager.

== Ground ==
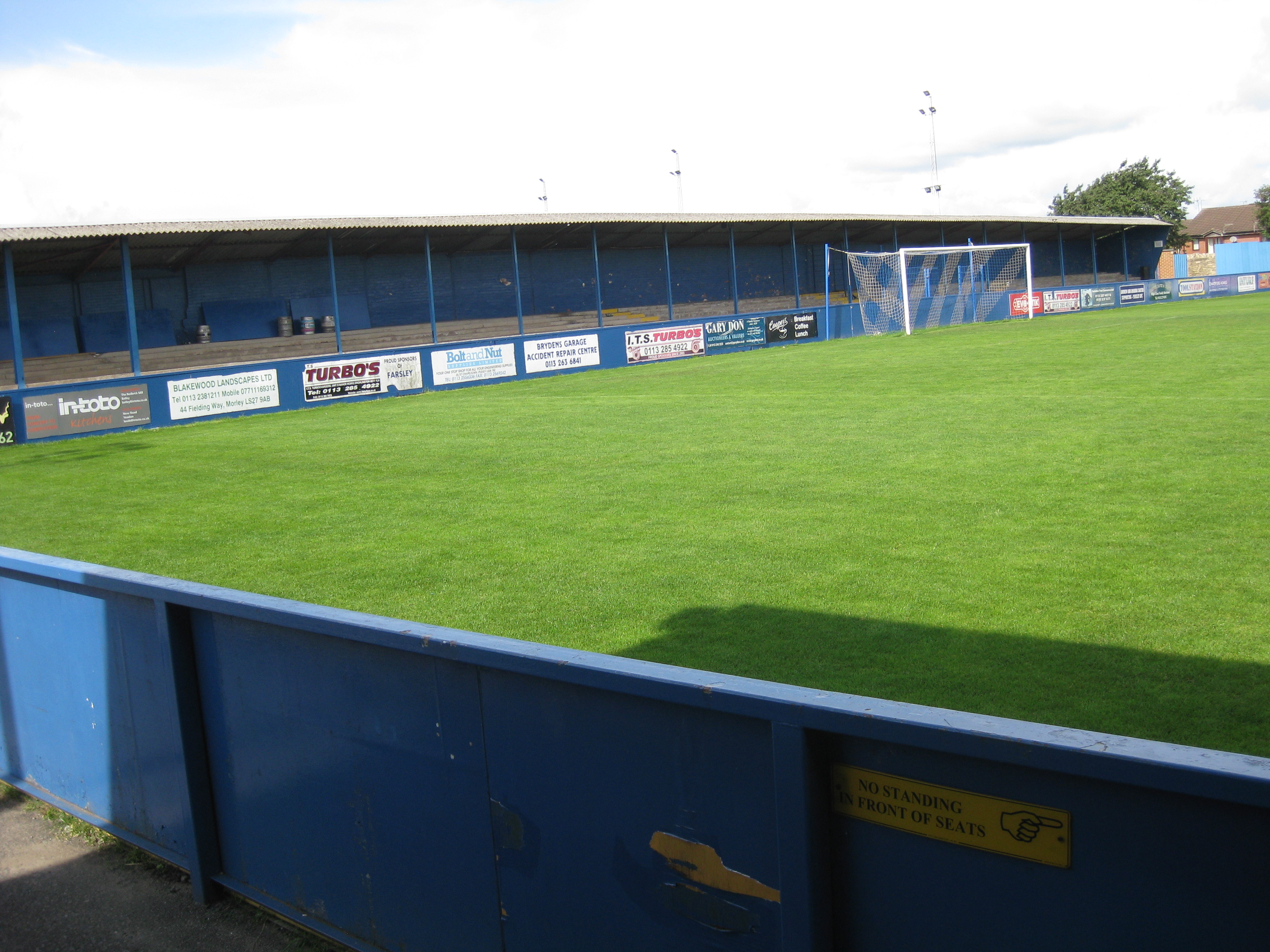
Throstle Nest

The club moved to Throstle Nest in 1948. Following the club's collapse into administration in 2009, Leeds City Council purchased the ground from the administrators and sold it to the owners of the new club, while retaining the adjoining sports hall and land proposed for new football pitches. The ground was renamed "The Citadel" in 2019. During the 2024–25 season Farsley were forced to play some home games at other stadiums including Bradford (Park Avenue)'s Horsfall Stadium and Buxton's the Silverlands due to issues with installing artificial turf at the stadium. In 2025 the ground was renamed back to Throstle Nest.

== Honours ==
- Northern Premier League
  - Premier Division champions 2018–19
- Yorkshire League
  - Division One champions 1959–60, 1968–69
  - Division Two champions 1952–53
- Northern Counties East League
  - Premier Division champions 2010–11
  - Division One North champions 1984–85
  - League Cup winners 2010–11
- West Riding County Cup
  - Winners 1957–58, 1959–60, 1966–67, 1970–71, 1983–84, 1987–88, 1994–95, 1996–97, 2000–01, 2005–06, 2016–17, 2017–18

== Records ==
- Best FA Cup performance: First round, 1974–75, 2006–07
- Best FA Trophy performance: Quarter-finals, 2022–23
- Best FA Vase performance: Quarter-finals, 1987–88
- Record attendance: 11,000 vs Tranmere Rovers, FA Cup first round, 1974–75 (at Elland Road)

== See also ==
- Farsley Celtic F.C. players
- Farsley Celtic F.C. managers
