= Listed buildings in Elland =

Elland is a town and an unparished area in the metropolitan borough of Calderdale, West Yorkshire, England. Elland ward contains 47 listed buildings that are recorded in the National Heritage List for England. Of these, two are listed at Grade I, the highest of the three grades, two are at Grade II*, the middle grade, and the others are at Grade II, the lowest grade. The ward contains the town of Elland, the hamlet of Blackley, and the surrounding area. The Calder and Hebble Navigation passes through the area, and the listed buildings associated with this are locks, a bridge, a milepost, a lock keeper's house, a warehouse, and an office. The other listed buildings include houses and cottages, churches and associated structures, public houses, a barn, a set of stocks, a mill warehouse, four milestones, a former town hall, a former bank, a war memorial, and two telephone kiosks.

== Key ==
Grade	Criteria
I	Buildings of exceptional interest, sometimes considered to be internationally important
II*	Particularly important buildings of more than special interest
II	Buildings of national importance and special interest

== Buildings ==
Name and location	Photograph	Date	Notes	Grade
St Mary's Church; 53.68692°N 1.83776°W		c. 1180	The oldest part of the church is the chancel arch, most of the church dates from the 13th and 14th centuries, and the tower from about 1490. The church is built in stone with stone slate roofs, and consists of a nave, north and south aisles embracing a west tower, a south porch, and a chancel. On the nave gable is a sanctus bellcote. The tower has three stages with diagonal buttresses, and an embattled parapet. The buttresses of the chancel are carved with goblets and gargoyles.	I
New Hall; 53.68508°N 1.82124°W		c. 1490	Originally timber framed the hall was refronted in stone in 1656–57. It has a stone slate roof, two storeys, and an H-shaped plan with additions. The hall consists of a two-bay hall range and porch, flanked by gabled cross-wings with copings, kneelers and finials, and to the right is a two-storey 18th-century recessed extension with a 17th-century single-storey outshut, and a 19th-century gabled wing. In the hall range is a mullioned and transomed window with 27 lights, two smaller windows, and an embattled parapet. To the right is a two-storey porch containing an "apple and pear" rose window with a semicircular hood mould above which is a small gable and finials. The semicircular-arched doorway has moulded jambs, voussoirs and imposts, and is surrounded by Doric columns and an entablature.	I
The Fleece Inn; 53.68534°N 1.84169°W		c. 1610	A house, later a public house, it is in stone with quoins, a string course, and a stone slate roof with coped gables and kneelers. There are two storeys, a U-shaped plan, consisting of a hall range and gabled cross-wings, and a rear kitchen wing. In the angle between the hall range and the east wing is a two-storey gabled porch with a depressed Tudor arched head and spandrels. The windows are mullioned or mullioned and transomed, the windows in the porch have arched upper lights.	II*
Broad Carr Cottages; 53.67491°N 1.85919°W	—	Early 17th century	A house, later divided into two dwellings, it is in rendered stone with a stone slate roof. There are two storeys, two bays, and a single-story aisle at the rear. The ground floor contains a doorway and mullioned windows, and the windows in the upper floor have been altered.	II
1 Dobson's Yard; 53.68688°N 1.83878°W	—	17th century	The house, which has a 19th-century front, is in stone with a stone slate roof and two storeys. On the front and left return are chamfered mullioned windows, and the right return contains two doorways with monolithic jambs, and square windows.	II
Rose and Crown; 53.68686°N 1.83842°W		Mid 17th century	A public house, later used for other purposes, it is in rendered stone with string courses, and a stone slate roof with coped gable and kneelers. There are two storeys and a U-shaped plan consisting of a single-bay hall range and cross-wings, all gabled. Some windows have been altered; others are mullioned and transomed.	II
7 Timber Street; 53.68485°N 1.83642°W	—	1675	A house later used for other purposes, it is in rendered stone, with a stone slate roof and two storeys. The doorway has moulded jambs, a Tudor arched head, and a deep lintel with the date and initials carved in a tressure. To the left is a five-light mullioned window with a hood mould rising over it and the doorway. The upper floor contains a double chamfered cross window, and at the rear is a doorway and another cross window.	II
Barn by road to Appleyard Farm; 53.68797°N 1.81731°W	—	Late 17th century	The barn is in stone with large quoins, a moulded string course, and a stone slate roof with a wide coped gable and a moulded kneeler. It has two bays and a single aisle, and the gable end facing the road contains nine square vents forming a diamond pattern.	II
55 and 57 Elland Lane; 53.68805°N 1.82438°W		1700	A stone house, rendered at the front, that has a stone slate roof with coped gables, kneelers and finials. There are two storeys, three bays, and a rear outshut. The doorway has chamfered jambs, a four-centred arched head, and a lintel with a decorative initialled and dated panel. The windows have recessed, splayed mullions, and above the ground floor windows is a hood mould which is stepped over the doorway.	II
Stocks; 53.68467°N 1.83602°W	—	17th or early 18th century	The stocks are in the garden of the Municipal Offices. They consist of two upright stone with rounded heads, and stone keepers containing holes.	II
Quarry House; 53.68743°N 1.80891°W	—	Early 18th century	A stone house, partly rendered, with quoins and a stone slate roof. There are two storeys, a double-pile plan, four bays, and a single-storey outshut to the east. The doorways have monolithic jambs, the windows are mullioned, and the house also includes a datestone and taking-in doors.	II
Blackley House; 53.67311°N 1.84185°W	—	1744	A house with an older cottage at the rear combined into one dwelling. It is in stone with quoins and coped gables with kneelers. The cottage has been much altered. The house has two storeys and a symmetrical front of five bays. The central doorway has a moulded architrave, a pulvinated frieze, and a pediment on console brackets. The windows on the front are sashes, and in the right return is a semicircular-arched window with a fanlight, and above is a similar staircase window.	II
Elland Lock; 53.69336°N 1.83357°W		c. 1770	The lock on the Calder and Hebble Navigation is in stone and has an angled entry. It has an earlier paddle mounting with rebates for gates.	II
Park Nook Lock; 53.69568°N 1.83001°W		c. 1770	The lock on the Calder and Hebble Navigation is in stone and has a square entry.	II
Woodside Mills Lock and bridge approach 53.68834°N 1.84802°W		c. 1770	The lock on the Calder and Hebble Navigation is built in massive stones. Smaller stones capped by large rusticated blocks lead up to the footbridge gantry.	II
20, 22 and 24 New Hey Road; 53.68524°N 1.79794°W	—	Late 18th century	A row of three stone cottages with a stone slate roof. There are two storeys, and each cottage has one bay and a doorway with monolithic jambs. Two of the windows have single lights, and the others are mullioned.	II
65 and 67 Southgate; 53.68507°N 1.83689°W	—	Late 18th century	A pair of stone houses with quoins, and a stone slate roof with coped gables and kneelers. There are three storeys, two bays, and a gabled end facing the road. No. 67 has shop windows in the ground floor, and a doorway across the angle. The doorway of No. 65 is at the left end, there is one central single-light window, and the other windows have four lights and are mullioned.	II
Elland Bridge; 53.68873°N 1.84079°W		Late 18th century	The bridge carries a road over the Calder and Hebble Navigation. It is in stone and consists of a single elliptical arch. The bridge has voussoirs, a keystone, a rusticated string course, and coped parapets.	II
Spring Gardens Public House; 53.68858°N 1.82736°W		Late 18th century	The public house is in stone with quoins and a stone slate roof. There are two storeys and three bays. On the front is a lean-to porch, and the windows are mullioned.	II
Blackley Chapel House; 53.67580°N 1.84842°W	—	1789	The chapel, later a house, is in stone with quoins, a string course, and a stone slate roof with saddle stones to the gable and moulded kneelers. The gabled front has three bays, and there are five bays along the sides. The windows on the front are square, and at the rear are two round-arched windows with keystones and impost blocks.	II
Canal milepost 53.69270°N 1.83452°W		Late 18th to early 19th century (probable)	The milepost is by the towpath of the Calder and Hebble Navigation. It is an upright stone with a curved head and chamfered edges, and is inscribed with the distance from "FALL INGS".	II
107 and 109 Lower Edge Road; 53.68937°N 1.80830°W	—	1813	A pair of mirror image cottages combined into one house, it is in stone with a stone slate roof. There are two storeys and two bays. The doorway of No. 109 has monolithic jambs and the other doorway is blocked. The windows are mullioned and on No. 109 is an inscribed and dated plaque.	II
Canal warehouse and integral house 53.68930°N 1.83908°W	—	c. 1820	The building is in stone with a stone slate roof and an L-shaped plan. It consists of a three-bay gabled wing with two storeys and an attic, and a five-bay main range with two storeys. On the front facing the canal the wing has taking-in doors and square windows, and the main range has a symmetrical front with arched openings in the middle bay, and windows with wedge lintels in the outer bays. On the front, the wing has a central doorway with a fanlight, and a lunette in the coped gable.	II
Wharf office, Elland Wharf; 53.68872°N 1.83964°W	—	c. 1820	The wharf office is in stone with a hipped stone slate roof. There is one storey, a rectangular plan, and a symmetrical front of three bays. In the centre is a doorway, and the windows are casements with cambered arches.	II
Providence United Reformed Church; 53.68543°N 1.83498°W		1822–23	The former church is in stone, and has a gabled front of three bays. The middle bay is recessed and arched and contains a projecting Doric porch. Above this is a round-arch windows, a date plaque, and a blocked oculus. The outer bays and the sides contain similar windows.	II
9, 11 and 13 Delf Hill; 53.68639°N 1.79751°W	—	Early 19th century	A row of three cottages, later combined into two, in stone with a stone slate roof and two storeys. There are two doorways with monolithic jambs, and the windows are mullioned.	II
18 and 20 South Lane; 53.68180°N 1.83459°W	—	Early 19th century	A pair of stone cottages with a stone slate roof. Each cottage has one bay, a doorway to the right, a sash window above it, and a three-light mullioned window in each floor to the left.	II
Beech Grove and South Bay; 53.67605°N 1.85681°W	—	Early 19th century	A house, later divided into two dwellings, it is in stone with a sill band, and a hipped slate roof. There are two storeys, and a symmetrical front of three bays. The central doorway has a fanlight with stained glass, and a cornice, and the windows are sashes.	II
Lock keeper's house, Elland Lock; 53.69331°N 1.83345°W		Early 19th century	The lock keeper's house is on the south side of Elland Lock on the Calder and Hebble Navigation. It is in stone with a hipped stone slate roof. There is one storey, three bays, and a lean-to on the right. The middle bay projects forward and has three angled faces, it contains a doorway with monolithic jambs, and the windows are square-headed.	II
Prospect View; 53.67604°N 1.84827°W	—	Early 19th century	A stone house that has a stone slate roof with coped gables and kneelers. There are two storeys, a double-depth plan, and two bays. The doorway on the front and in the gable end have monolithic jambs, most of the windows are mullioned, and in the gable end is a sash window.	II
The Savile Arms Hotel; 53.68634°N 1.83859°W		Early 19th century	A public house in stone with quoins, a sill band, and a stone slate roof. There are two storeys and five bays. The right two bays project, and the outer bay has a two-storey bay window. In the middle bay is a doorway with monolithic jambs and a square hood. The windows are large and square, and in the first bay is a curved tablet with a coat of arms and a motto.	II
The Wellington Public House; 53.68526°N 1.83701°W		Early 19th century	A stone public house with quoins and a stone slate roof. There are two storeys, and the windows are sashes.	II
Exchange Mill; 53.68723°N 1.84029°W		Early to mid 19th century	A mill warehouse, it is in stone with a stone slate roof. There are five storeys, the gabled rear has five bays, and there are eight bays on the sides. The middle bay at the rear contains a loading bay in each floor with a small blocked Venetian window at the top. Elsewhere are rectangular windows with heavy lintels.	II
3, 5 and 7 Southgate; 53.68629°N 1.83819°W	—	c. 1840	A row of three shops in stone with rusticated quoins, string courses, a dentilled cornice, a blocking course, and a slate roof, There are three storeys and three bays. In the ground floor are shop fronts divided by rusticated piers. The middle floor contains tripartite windows with Ionic half-columns as mullions, above them is an entablature, and each window has a pediment, segmental over the middle window and triangular over the outer windows. The top floor contains windows with cambered heads, shouldered architraves, and keystones. Between the middle windows is decoration including volutes.	II
Wall and gate piers, Providence Church; 53.68532°N 1.83521°W	—	c. 1850	A dwarf stone wall with railings encloses the forecourt of the church. It contains a pair of gate piers and a pair of end piers. The piers are in stone, and each pier is panelled on a plinth, and has a heavy cornice cap and a shaped blocking course.	II
Milestone near Ainley Bottom; 53.67984°N 1.82713°W		Mid 19th century	The milestone is on the northeast side of Huddersfield Road. It has an arched head, a triangular plan, two projecting faces, and a cast iron front. On the head is "HALIFAX AND HUDDERSFIELD ROAD" "ELLAND", and on the faces are the distances to Elland Town Hall, Halifax and Huddersfield.	II
Milestone by entrance to Elland New Hall; 53.68312°N 1.82153°W		Mid 19th century	The milestone is on the north side of Dewsbury Road (B6114 road). It has an arched head, a triangular plan, two projecting faces, and a cast iron front. On the head is "DEWSBURY AND ELLAND ROAD" "ELLAND", and on the faces are the distances to Elland Town Hall, Wakefield and Dewsbury.	II
Milestone opposite Long Lea Mill; 53.68812°N 1.84353°W		Mid 19th century	The milestone is on the north side of Halifax Road (A6025 road). It has an arched head, a triangular plan, two projecting faces, and a cast iron front. On the head is "HALIFAX AND HUDDERSFIELD ROAD" "ELLAND", and on the faces are the distances to Elland Town Hall, Halifax Town Hall, and Huddersfield.	II
Milestone opposite 19 Park Road; 53.69281°N 1.83488°W	—	Mid 19th century	The milestone is on the southeast side of Park Road (A6025 road). It has an arched head, a triangular plan, two projecting faces, and a cast iron front. On the head is "ELLAND AND BRIGHOUSE ROAD" "ELLAND", and on the faces are the distances to Elland, Wakefield and Dewsbury.	II
Blackley Baptist Church; 53.67562°N 1.84767°W		1878–79	The church is in sandstone on a plinth, with string courses, and a pedimented gable on the front. There are two storeys at the front, three at the rear, a symmetrical front of four bays, and six bays along the sides. In the centre are paired doorways with archivolt-arched fanlights, flanked by Doric columns and an entablature, and the window also have archivolt arches.	II
Bethesda Methodist Church; 53.68353°N 1.84068°W		1879–80	The church, designed by William Hill in Gothic Revival style, is in stone with a slate roof. The west front contains an entrance with a moulded round arch and columns, and paired doorways with pointed arches flanked by lancet windows. Above is a four-light window flanked by lancets and above is a gable. This is flanked by square pilasters rising to turrets with decorative pyramidal spires. Along the sides are two storeys and seven bays, two of the bays gabled. Most of the windows are mullioned, and at the east end is a circular window.	II
Former Town Hall; 53.68433°N 1.83514°W		1887–88	The town hall, later used for other purposes, is in stone with hipped slate roof, and is in Italianate style. There are two storeys and a front of three bays. In the middle bay is a giant portico with steps leading up to two round-arched doorways with moulded surrounds and keystones. The side walls are rusticated with piers and finials. Above the doorways is a balcony with a balustrade and a Venetian window with a moulded surround. Pairs of Corinthian pilasters carry an entablature and a decorated pediment. Over the pediment is a square cupola with clock faces and a dome with corner urns and a weathervane. Along the sides are shop fronts and round-arched windows.	II
Britannia Buildings; 53.68758°N 1.83908°W		1893	A bank, later used for other purposes, it is in stone with columns and pilasters in Aberdeen granite, all on a panelled plinth. The central doorway has been altered, above it is a modillioned pediment and a three-light window with decorated mullions, and it is flanked by pairs of Corinthian columns. Outside these are panels with decorative coats of arms and Corinthian pilasters. Above is an entablature with a decorated frieze and a pediment with a tympanum containing a cartouche. Flanking the pediment are balustrades with urns, and at the top is a statue of Britannia.	II
All Saints Church; 53.68051°N 1.83887°W		1900–03	The church was designed by G. H. Fellowes Prynne, it was built in two phases, and completed in 1917. It is in stone with a tile roof, and consists of a nave and chancel under one roof, a clerestory, low lean-to north and south aisles, a west embattled baptistry, and transeptal chapels, the north chapel with an apse, and the south chapel with a stair turret. Above the chancel arch is a wooden flèche with a copped spire. Most of the windows are lancets, and in the chapel are rose windows.	II*
War memorial 53.68461°N 1.84690°W		c. 1922	The war memorial is in The Park. It consists of a bronze statue of a soldier in First World War battledress standing on a white granite plinth on three steps. The plinth has an inscription and the names of those lost in the two World Wars.	II
Telephone kiosk (left); 53.68420°N 1.83481°W	—	1935	The K6 type telephone kiosk stands to the left of the entrance to the former Town Hall. It was designed by Giles Gilbert Scott, it is constructed in cast iron with a square plan and a dome, and has three unperforated crowns in the top panels.	II
Telephone kiosk (right); 53.68427°N 1.83475°W	—	1935	The K6 type telephone kiosk stands to the left of the entrance to the former Town Hall. It was designed by Giles Gilbert Scott, it is constructed in cast iron with a square plan and a dome, and has three unperforated crowns in the top panels.	II
