= Church of St Mary, Elland =

Anglican church in West Yorkshire, England

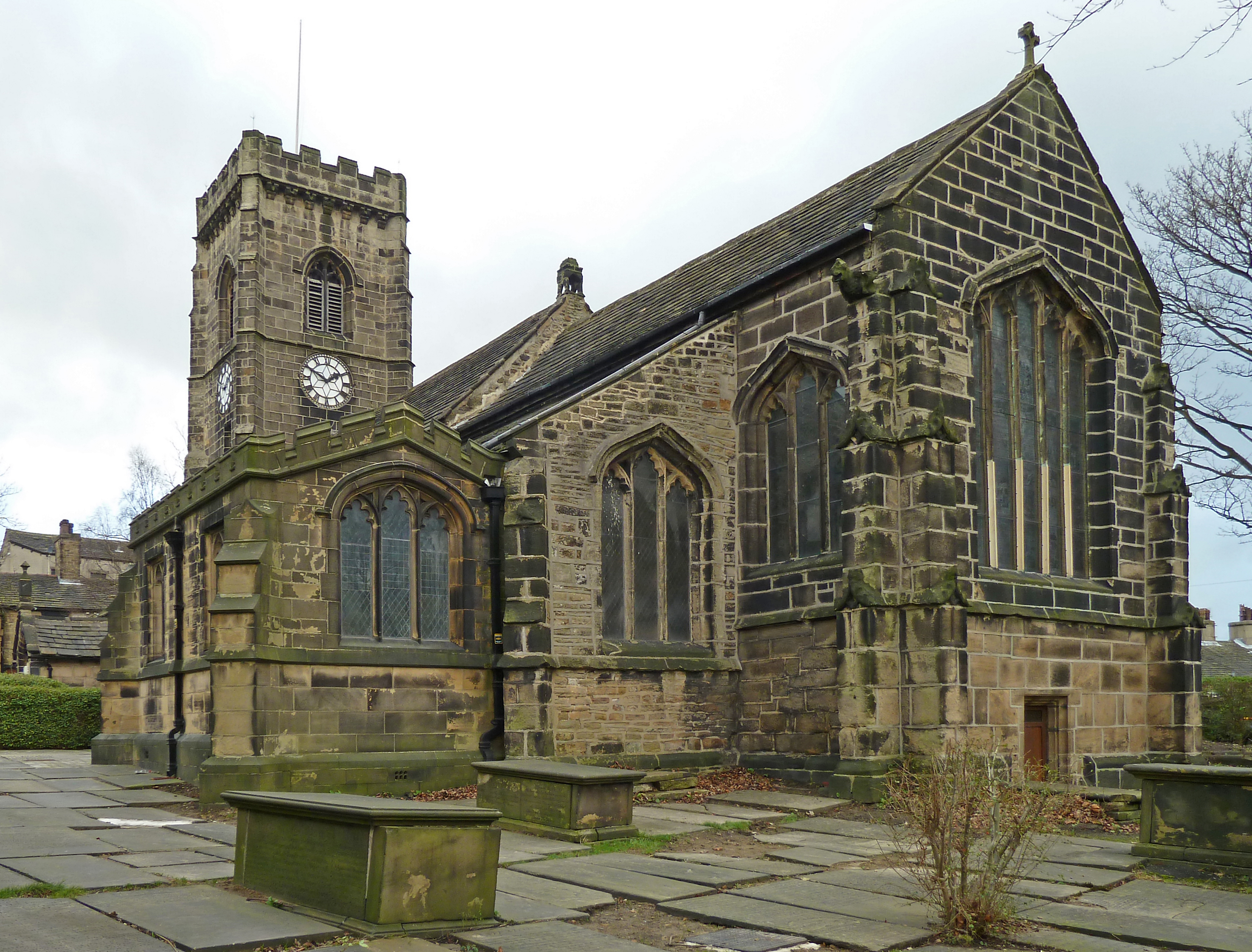
- Church of St Mary, Elland
- 53°41′13″N 1°50′16″W
- OS grid reference: SE 10805 21167
- Location: Church Street, Elland, West Yorkshire, HX5 0RU
- Country: England
- Denomination: Church of England
- Churchmanship: Central/Modern Catholic

History
- Status: Active
- Dedication: Saint Mary the Virgin

Architecture
- Functional status: Parish church
- Heritage designation: Grade I listed
- Years built: 13th century

Administration
- Diocese: Diocese of Leeds
- Archdeaconry: Archdeaconry of Halifax
- Parish: Saint Mary the Virgin, Elland

Clergy
- Rector: The Revd Canon David Burrows

The Church of St Mary is a Church of England parish church in Elland, West Yorkshire, England. The church is a Grade I listed building.

== History ==
Stones in the chancel arch have been dated to approximately 1170 to 1180. Most of the present church dates from the 13th and 14th centuries. It was restored in 1856 by W. H. Crossland. The stained glass in the east window dates from the 15th century and depicts 21 scenes from the life of St Mary the Virgin. The church has a west tower, and a Sanctus bellcote on the gable of the nave.

On 24 January 1968, the church was designated a Grade I listed building.

== Present day ==
The Church of St Mary is part of the Benefice of "Saint Mary the Virgin, Elland and All Saints, Elland" in the Archdeaconry of Halifax and the Huddersfield Episcopal Area of the Diocese of Leeds.

The parish stands in the Central to modern Catholic traditions of the Church of England.

== Notable people ==
- Felix Arnott, later Archbishop of Brisbane, served his curacy in the benefice in the 1930s.

== See also ==
- Grade I listed buildings in West Yorkshire
- Grade I listed churches in West Yorkshire
- Listed buildings in Elland
