= Elland =

Town in West Yorkshire, England

Coordinates: 53.683°N 1.840°W

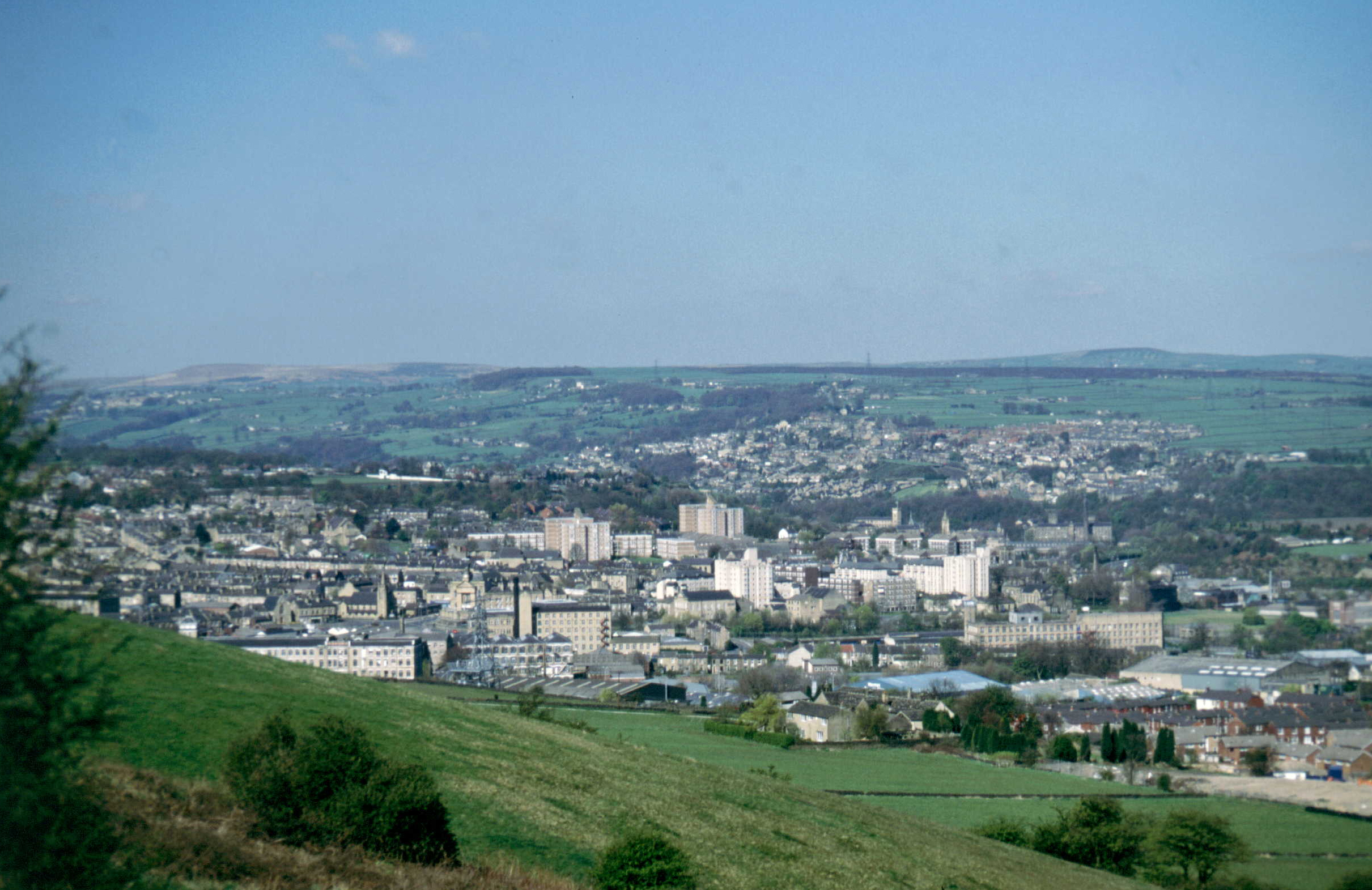
- A view of Elland

- Location within West Yorkshire
- Population: 11,676 (Ward at 2011 census)
- OS grid reference: SE106208
- Metropolitan borough: Calderdale
- Metropolitan county: West Yorkshire
- Region: Yorkshire and the Humber
- Country: England
- Sovereign state: United Kingdom
- Post town: ELLAND
- Postcode district: HX5
- Dialling code: 01422
- Police: West Yorkshire
- Fire: West Yorkshire
- Ambulance: Yorkshire
- UK Parliament: Calder Valley

Elland is a market town in Calderdale, in the county of West Yorkshire, England. It is situated south of Halifax, by the River Calder and the Calder and Hebble Navigation. Elland was recorded as Elant in the Domesday Book of 1086. It had a population of 14,554 at the 2001 Census, with the ward being measured at 11,676 in the 2011 Census.

== Etymology ==
The name of Elland is attested in the 1086 Domesday Book as Elant. The name comes from the Old English words ēa ('river') and land ('land'); the name relates to the settlement's location on the south bank of the Calder.

== History ==
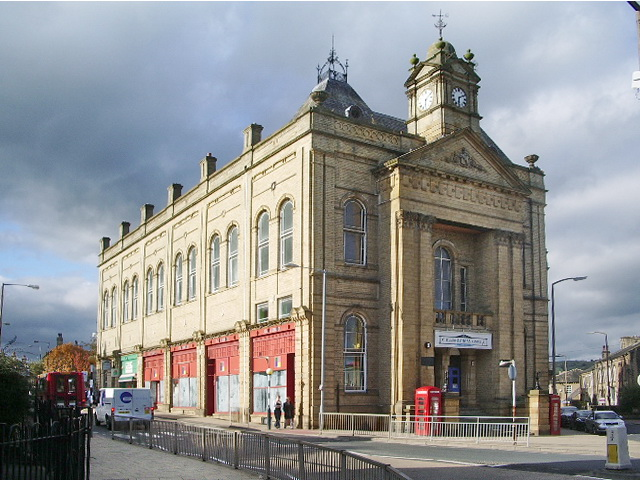
Elland Town Hall

Elland retained continuity of tenure from before the Norman Conquest into the Middle Ages, as the Elland family were descended from Anglo-Saxon thegns. The Manor of Elland, with Greetland and Southowram, formed an exclave of the Honour of Pontefract in the surrounding Manor of Wakefield. In 1350 Sir John de Eland was murdered, as were his son and grandson in the following year, which extinguished the male line of the family and the manor passed to the Savile family. From this period, the manor house ceased to be the principal dwelling of a gentry family, as the Saviles had their seat at the moated manor of Thornhill. Elland manor house was never completely reconstructed and, when dismantled and excavated in 1975 by the West Yorkshire Archaeology Unit, it was found to incorporate a 13th-century solar wing – one of the earliest secular buildings in the county. The manor house stood on a knoll aligned with the bridge over the River Calder and was destroyed during the construction of Calderdale Way bypass. The farm buildings survive.

At the request of John de Warenne, 7th Earl of Surrey, Edward II granted a charter to John de Eland, for a free market on Tuesday at his Manor of Elland, and two fairs.

The town became a centre of wool production. The decline of the woollen industry had a significant effect on the town and many mills were demolished or converted to residences.

Durable flagstones, Elland flags, were quarried near the town and after the canal was constructed, they could be transported economically all over the county. Elland housed the main factory of the manufacturer of Gannex products and is the home of the Dobsons sweet factory, which produces traditional boiled sweets. Since 2001, Elland has been home to Suma Wholefoods, the largest workers' co-operative in the United Kingdom.

== Governance ==
Elland was historically a township, with Greetland, in the large ancient parish of Halifax. The township became a civil parish in 1866, but in 1894 Elland was separated from Greetland and became Elland Urban District (and civil parish). In 1937 Greetland and Stainland were added to the Urban District. In 1974 the urban district and civil parish were abolished and merged into Calderdale Metropolitan Borough.

== Landmarks ==
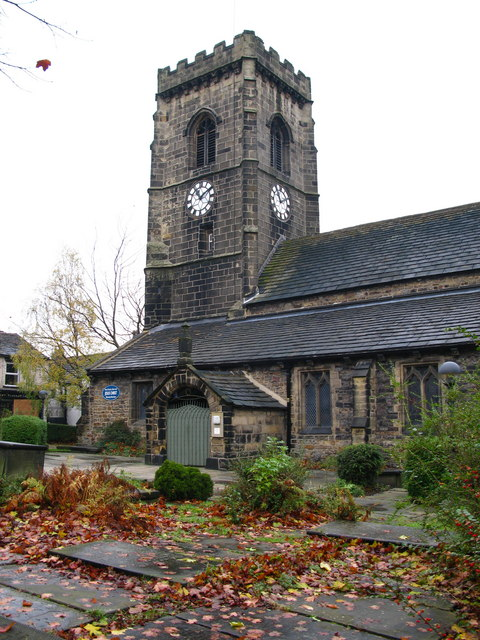
The church of St Mary the Virgin

Buildings of interest include the parish church of St Mary the Virgin, the former Rose and Crown Inn in Northgate, Elland Town Hall, Southgate Methodist Church, the reputedly haunted Fleece Inn at the top of Westgate, the Rex Cinema and Waxman ceramics on Elland Lane. The remains of the medieval stocks can be found at the junction of Southgate and Elizabeth Street. The stocks, which are grade II listed, date from the late 17th, or early 18th century.

== Elland Power Station ==
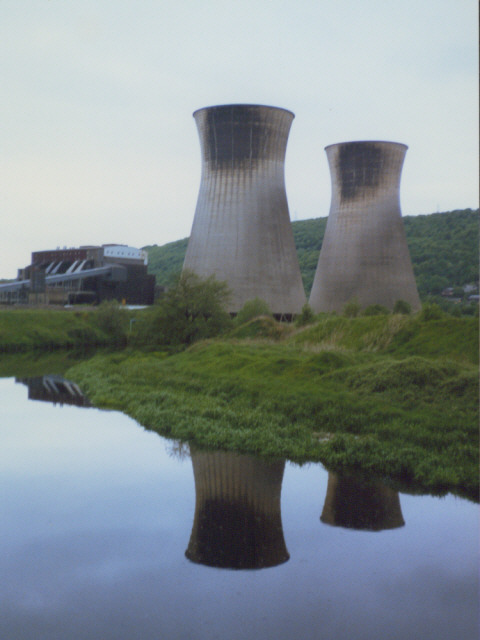
Elland Power Station in 1991

Elland Power Station was a coal-fired power station by the River Calder. It was decommissioned and closed in 1991, in keeping with the trend of generating power at fewer but larger power stations away from towns, and demolished in 1996.

== Transport ==
The Calder and Hebble Navigation opened in the late-18th century to serve the growing industrialisation of the Calder Valley.

Elland railway station closed in 1962 but the line is still in use as a passenger service for the Caldervale Line. The station has been proposed for re-opening with direct services to Leeds, Bradford, Halifax and Huddersfield. As of March 2023 planning approval for the new station was granted, with building work planned to begin in 2024 and be completed in 2025. This work was not completed but funding for the station has been included in the West Yorkshire Combined Authority's plans for infrastructure investment in 2026.

The A643 road begins in Leeds and ended in Elland. It passes Leeds United's football ground, Elland Road. It now ends at junction 23 of the M62 motorway.

In 1971, the Elland Bypass was to start around late 1972, but there was a public inquiry on 27 November 1973 at the Civic Hall. The 2.5-mile Elland bypass started construction on 23 February 1976 to finish by the end of August 1978, costing £8.5 million, built by A. Monk. The steel construction was by Braithwaites of north Nottinghamshire. It was opened at 11 am on Wednesday 13 December 1978 by Tom Batty, the chairman of West Yorkshire County Council.

== Media ==
Local news and television programmes are provided by BBC Yorkshire and ITV Yorkshire. Television signals are received from the Emley Moor and the local relay TV transmitters.

Local radio stations are BBC Radio Leeds, Heart Yorkshire, Capital Yorkshire, Hits Radio West Yorkshire, Greatest Hits Radio West Yorkshire, and Phoenix Radio, a community based station.

The local newspapers are the Halifax Courier, the Telegraph & Argus and the Huddersfield Daily Examiner.

== Sport ==
Elland is represented in Association Football by Ealandians FC where the men's first team compete in the first tier of the Yorkshire Amateur League, the Supreme Division and were league champions in 2024-25. Huddersfield Amateur FC, founded in 1905 are also based in Elland at Old Earth and run a variety of men's and women's teams, as of 2026, the men's first team are members of the West Yorkshire Association Football League and the women's first team are members of the West Riding County Womens Football League.

Despite their name, Greetland FC mens first team who compete in the Yorkshire Amateur League also play in Elland and are based at Brooksbank School and run a number of adult and youth teams.

Elland CC merged with Warley in 2024 and play in the Halifax Cricket League as Warley & Elland and share their ground and facilities with Ealandians FC at Hullen Edge.

== Notable people ==
- Thomas Thornton (1922–1987), first-class cricketer

== See also ==
- Ellands, a surname
- Elland (UK Parliament constituency)
- Listed buildings in Elland
