= Westmorland County Football Association =

Area sporting organization with 19th century origins

- Westmorland County FA logo
- Formation: 1897
- Purpose: Football association
- Location: Kendal
- Coordinates: 54.313385°N 2.742124°W
- Executive Officer: Jo Ashworth
- Website: www.westmorlandfa.com

The Westmorland County Football Association is the governing body of football in the county of Westmorland. The association was formed in 1897.

== County league competitions ==
- Division One
- Division Two
- Division Three
- Division Four

== County cup competitions ==
The Westmorland Senior Challenge Cup is the senior county knockout competition. The full list is:

- Senior Challenge Cup (men)
- Benevolent Trophy (men)
- Junior Cup (men)
- Under 18 County Cup (boys)
- Minor Cup (boys)
- Under 13 County Cup (boys)
- Dallam Towers Cup (boys)
- SM Jones Trophy (boys)
- Women's Senior Challenge Cup
- Under 12 Girls Cup
- Under 14 Girls Cup
- Under 16 Girls Cup
