= Yorkshire Amateur Football League =

Association football league in West Yorkshire, England

- Organising body: West Riding County Football Association
- Founded: 1928
- Country: England
- Divisions: Supreme Division; Premier Division; Championship Division; Division One; Division Two; Division Three; Division Four; Division Five; Division Six; Division Seven
- Number of clubs: 120
- Level on pyramid: Level 11 (Supreme Division)
- Promotion to: Northern Counties East League - Division One
- Domestic cup(s): Terry Marflitt Cup; Holders: Leeds U.F.C.A. Hancock Cup; Holders: Marsden; Hodgson Cup; Holders: Lepton Highlanders Reserves
- Current champions: 2024–25: Ealandians (Supreme); Berry Brow (Premier); Ryburn United Reserves (Championship); Salts FC (One); Midgley United (Two); Garforth Rangers (Three); FC Queensbury (Four); Great Preston (Five); Otley Town (Six)
- Website: Official website

The Yorkshire Amateur Association Football League is an amateur competitive football league based in West Yorkshire, England. The league has a total of eight divisions, the highest of which is the Yorkshire Amateur League Supreme Division, which sits at level 11 of the English football league system. It is a feeder to the Northern Counties East Football League.

The League runs three League Cup competitions annually. Teams in the Premier Division, Championship, and Division One contest the Terry Marflitt Trophy. The Hancock Cup is contested by teams in Division Two and Division Three. Teams in Division Four and Division Five contest for the Hodgson Cup.

In the 2008–09 season, Gildersome Spurs Old Boys made the record books by winning all four of the competitions they entered, including Senior B, the Terry Marflitt Trophy, the Yorkshire Old Boys Shield, and the Wheatley District Cup.

The Yorkshire Amateur Association Football League received FA Charter Standard status in the 2017-18 season and celebrated being in existence for 90 years. The Terry Marflitt Trophy and Hancock Cup finals were held at South Leeds Stadium as part of these celebrations.

Before the 2019–20 season, the Yorkshire League was admitted to Step 7 of the National League System (NLS) after creating the Supreme Division, which took seven clubs from the dissolved West Riding County Amateur Football League. At that step, the league's top division succeeded its former West Riding County League counterpart. It was abolished ahead of the next season and replaced with the designation Regional NLS Feeder Leagues. The first team to gain promotion was Route One Rovers, which in 2023 was elevated to the North West Counties Football League, and the following season saw Middleton win promotion, this time to the Northern Counties East Football League.

== Member clubs 2026–27 ==
=== Supreme Division ===
- Berry Brow
- Bradford United
- Collegians
- Ealandians
- FC Farsley
- Gildersome Spurs Old Boys
- Golcar United Reserves
- Greetland
- Leeds Medics & Dentists
- Leeds Modernians
- Lepton Highlanders
- Marsden
- Ryburn United
- Shelley
- South Leeds
- Yorkshire Ammers

=== Premier ===
- Leeds City
- Leeds Medics and Dentists Reserves
- Linthwaite Athletic
- Newsome
- Norristhorpe
- Route One Rovers
- Ryburn United Reserves
- Salts
- Shelf United
- Shire Academics
- Stanningley Old Boys
- UFCA Leeds

=== Championship ===
- Berry Brow Reserves
- Durkar
- Ealandians Reserves
- Fairbank United
- Guildersome Spurs Reserves
- Leeds Modernians Reserves
- Morley Town AFC
- Nostell M.W.F.C Reserves
- UFCA Leeds u23s
- Ventus Yeadon Celtic
- Woodkirk Valley
- Yorkshire Ammers SU Reserves

=== Division 1 ===
- Britannia Sports
- Clayton AFC
- Colton Athletic
- Garforth Rangers
- Golcar United Reserves
- Gomersal & Cleckheaton
- Greetland Reserves
- Hebden Royd Red Star
- Huddersfield LH
- Midgley United
- Ryburn United 3rds
- Shelf Juniors

=== Division 2 ===
- Bradford Olympic
- Dewsbury Rangers
- Farsley Celtic Juniors
- Leeds City Reserves
- Leeds Medics & Dentists 3rds
- Lepton Highlanders Reserves
- Marsden Reserves
- Middleton Park
- Priestleys
- Rothwell Juniors
- Scisset
- Shire Academics Reserves

=== Division 3 ===
- Collegians Reserves
- Copley
- Farnley Sports
- Kirkstall Crusaders
- Mount Pleasant
- North Leeds
- Queensbury
- Polonia Yorkshire
- Savile Town
- South Leeds Reserves
- Sowerby Bridge
- Wakefield Thornesians

=== Division 4 ===
- Calder 76
- Great Preston
- Howden Clough
- Leeds City 3rds
- Leeds Modernians 3rds
- Lower Hopton
- Methley United
- Nostell M.W Reserves
- Old Centralians
- St Bedes
- Wakefield United
- Woodkirk Valley Reserves

=== Division 5 ===
- Birstall Rovers
- Colton Athletic Reserves
- Dewsbury Rangers Reserves
- Ealandians 3rds
- Guiseley Juniors
- Lepton Highlanders 3rds
- Morley Reserves
- Ossett
- Salts Reserves
- Scholemoor
- Sowerby United
- Tyersal

=== Division 6 ===
- Beeston Juniors
- Calverley United
- Collegians 3rds
- Greetland 3rds
- Halifax Amateurs
- Hebden Royd Red Star Reserves
- Horsforth St Margarets
- Leeds Modernians 4ths
- Methley United Reserves
- Morley Town 3rds
- Stanningley Old Boys Reserves
- Thorpe Athletic

=== Division 7 ===
- Beeston Juniors Reserves
- Calverley United Reserves
- Crossleys
- Idle
- Lower Hopton Reserves
- Marsden 3rds
- Midgley United Reserves
- North Leeds Reserves
- Old Centralians Reserves
- Ryburn United 4ths
- Stanley
- West End Park

== Champions ==
Recent divisional champions

Season	Supreme Division	Premier Division (ex-Senior Division 'A')	Championship (ex-Senior Division 'B')	Division One	Division Two	Division Three	Division Four	Division Five	Division Six	Division Seven
2006–07		Yorkshire Bank	Old Centralians	Sandal Athletic	Gildersome Spurs Old Boys Reserves	East Leeds Trinity Old Boys	Old Collegians Reserves	Bramley Juniors Old Boys Reserves		
2007–08		Ealandians	Bramley Juniors Old Boys	Alwoodley Old Boys	Wheelwright Old Boys	Ealandians Reserves	Alwoodley Old Boys Reserves	Grangefield Old Boys Reserves		
2008–09		Leeds Medics & Dentists	Gildersome Spurs Old Boys	Wheelwright Old Boys	Amaranth Old Boys	Grangefield Old Boys	Colton Academicals 'A'	Ealandians 'A'		
2009–10		Alwoodley Old Boys	Leeds Medics & Dentists Reserves	Wortley Reserves	Grangefield Old Boys	Wortley 'A'	Bramley Juniors Old Boys 'A'	Leeds City Old Boys Reserves		
2010–11		Stanningley Old Boys	Bainbridge	Grangefield Old Boys	North East Leeds	St. Bedes Old Boys Reserves	Colton FC 'A'	Beeston Old Boys Reserves		
2011–12		Stanningley Old Boys	North East Leeds	Stanningley Old Boys Reserves	Farnley Sports	Old Modernians Reserves	Beeston Old Boys Reserves	Wheelwright Old Boys		
2012–13		Gildersome Spurs Old Boys	Leeds Medics & Dentists Reserves	Farsley Celtic Juniors	Morley Town AFC	Beeston Old Boys Reserves	Almondburians Reserves	Middleton Park Reserves		
2013–14		Gildersome Spurs Old Boys	Farsley Celtic Juniors	Morley Town AFC	Almondburians	Wheelwright Old Boys	Churwell Lions	Leeds City Old Boys Reserves		
2014–15		Ealandians	Farnley Sports	St. Nicholas	Wortley	Farsley Celtic Juniors Reserves	Horsforth St. Margaret's	Horsforth St. Margaret's Reserves	Amaranth Reserves	
2015–16		Farsley Celtic Juniors	St. Nicholas	Drighlington FC	Gildersome Spurs Old Boys	Horsforth St. Margaret's	Amaranth Reserves	Huddersfield Amateur	Morley Town AFC III	
2016–17		Farsley Celtic Juniors	Drighlington FC	Gildersome Spurs Old Boys	Idle FC	East Ardsley Wanderers	Morley Town AFC III	Garforth Crusaders	Morley Amateur	
2017–18		Drighlington FC	Horsforth St. Margaret's Saturday	Leeds City Old Boys	Garforth Crusaders	Shire Academics Reserves	Leeds City Old Boys III	Rothwell Reserves		
2018–19		Farsley Celtic Juniors	Wortley	Amaranth Crossgates	Colton Athletic	New Middleton	Middleton Park	Savile United FC		
2019–20		Season curtailed due to coronavirus disease pandemic								
2020-21	Horsforth St Margaret's	Middleton	Tvr United	Leeds City FC Reserves	Wortley Reserves	Norristhorpe Reserves	Mount St. Marys	Crofton Sports Reserves		
2021-22	Littletown FC	Leeds University	Lepton Highlanders	Norristhorpe	Middleton Reserves	Stanningley Old Boys	Farnley Sports	Leeds City FC IV		
2022-23	Route One Rovers	Greetland AFC	Hanging Heaton FC	Stanningley Old Boys	Marsden FC	Gildersome Spurs Old Boys Reserves	Methley United	Collegians Reserves		
2023-24	*Middleton	Sowerby Bridge	Marsden FC	Ryburn United Reserves	Gildersome Spurs Old Boys Reserves	Farnley Sports	Nostell Miners Welfare Reserves	Dewsbury Rangers Reserves		
2024-25	Ealandians	Berry Brow	Ryburn United Reserves	Salts FC	Midgley United	Garforth Rangers	FC Queensbury	Great Preston	Otley Town	
2025-26	Berry Brow	Leeds Modernians	Salts FC	Berry Brow Reserves	Greetland Reserves	Scisset	Collegians Reserves	Woodkirk Valley Reserves	Shelf Juniors Reserves	Collegians 3rds
