= North Devon Football League =

Association football league in England

- Founded: 1904
- Country: England
- Divisions: 3
- Number of clubs: 39
- Feeder to: Devon Football League
- Website: http://www.northdevonfootballleague.org.uk

The North Devon Football League is a football competition based in England, established in 1904. The top division of this league, the Premier Division, has been a feeder to the Devon Football League since 2019, and previously, the South West Peninsula League. The North Devon Gazette sponsors the league and so the full, sponsored name of the league is the North Devon Gazette Football League.

The league covers a 30-mile (50 km) radius from Barnstaple.

== 2025–26 Members ==
Premier Division

- AFC Dumnonii
- Appledore Lions
- Boca Seniors Reserves
- Braunton
- Combe Martin
- Fremington Reserves
- Hartland
- Holsworthy Reserves
- Landkey Town
- Morwenstow
- Shamwickshire Rovers
- Torridgeside Reserves
- Woolsery

Senior Division

- ~~AFC Dumnonii Reserves~~
- Bideford Reserves
- Bradworthy
- Braunton Reserves
- Combe Martin Reserves
- Georgeham & Croyde Rovers
- Kingsley Park
- Lynton
- Merton
- Shamwickshire Rovers Reserves
- Shebbear United
- South Molton

Intermediate Division One

- Braunton 3rds
- Equalizers
- Fremington 3rds
- Hartland Reserves
- High Bickington
- Holsworthy 3rds
- Kingsley Wizards
- Langtree Lions
- Morwenstow Reserves
- Northam Lions
- Putford
- Sandymere Blues
- South Molton Reserves
- Torridgeside 3rds

== Old divisions ==
Here are the old divisions of the league which have since become defunct:

- Division Two – The division below the Premier Division, which ran from 1904 to 1958.
- Division Three – The division below Division Two, which ran from 1921 to 1951.
- Intermediate Division Two – Ran until 2024
- Intermediate Division Three – Ran from 2018 to 2022.
- Intermediate Division Four – Ran from 1971 to 1981.
- Minor Division – The division below every other division in the league, which ran from 1934 to 1983.

== Recent divisional Champions ==
Season	Premier Division	Senior Division	Division One	Division Two
1999–00	Ilfracombe Town Reserves	High Bickington	Woolsery	Bideford Youth (West), Red Star Barum (East)
2000–01	Season abandoned	Season abandoned	Season abandoned	Season abandoned
2001–02	Shamwickshire Rovers	Barnstaple Amateur Athletic Club	Bideford Youth	Wrey Arms
2002–03	Shamwickshire Rovers	Boca Seniors	Seamus O'Donnell's	Lovacott
2003–04	Braunton	Hartland	Torrington 'A'	Woolacombe
2004–05	Morwenstow	Shamwickshire Rovers Reserves	Woolacombe	Torridgeside
2005–06	Boca Seniors	Woolacombe	Northam Lions Reserves	Dolton Rangers Reserves
2006–07	Boca Seniors	North Molton	Bratton Fleming	Grosvenor
2007–08	Boca Seniors	Ilfracombe Town Reserves	Combe Martin Reserves	Anchor
2008–09	Boca Seniors	Torrington	Landkey Town	Buckland Brewer
2009–10	Shamwickshire Rovers	Braunton Reserves	Woolsery	Wrey Arms
2010–11	Boca Seniors	Pilton Academicals	Wrey Arms	Northside Atlantic
2011–12	Boca Seniors	Bideford Reserves	Fremington	Barnstaple
2012–13	Torridgeside	Fremington	Barnstaple	Braunton 'B'
2013–14	Boca Seniors	Park United	Woolacombe & Mortehoe	Chivenor
2014–15	Braunton	Landkey Town	Chivenor	Appledore Academy
2015–16	Braunton	Hartland	Sporting Barum	Ilfracombe Town 'A'
2016–17	Ilfracombe Town	Ilfracombe Town Reserves	Appledore Reserves	Bridgerule
2017–18	Park United	Pilton Academicals	Torrington Reserves	Bideford CAFC Spurs
2018–19	Park United	Appledore Reserves	Bideford CAFC Reserves	Appledore Lions
2019–20	Season abandoned	Season abandoned	Season abandoned	Season abandoned
2020–21	Season abandoned	Season abandoned	Season abandoned	Season abandoned
2021–22	Park United	Shamwickshire Rovers	Barum United	Sandymere Blues
2022–23	Boca Seniors	Appledore Reserves	AFC Dumnonii	Shamwickshire Rovers Reserves
2023–24	Boca Seniors	AFC Dumnonii	Morwenstow	Merton
2024–25	Boca Seniors	Braunton Reserves	Shamwickshire Rovers Reserves	
2025-26	Shamwickshire Rovers	Bradworthy	Langtree Lions	

The 2000–01 season was abandoned due to an outbreak of foot and mouth disease in the area. The 2019–20 and 2020–21 seasons were abandoned due to the COVID-19 pandemic.

== League Champions by team since 1904 ==
Team	Championships
Appledore	10
Boca Seniors	9
South Molton	7
Barnstaple Town	6
Fremington	6
Ilfracombe Town	6
Braunton	5
Bradworthy United	5
Shamwickshire Rovers	5
Torrington	4
Lynton	3
Park United	3
RAF Chivenor	3
Bideford AAC	2
Combe Martin	2
Holsworthy	2
Pilton Centre	2
Taw Ship Yard (Barnstaple)	2
Abbey Centre	1
Barnstaple F.C.	1
Barnstaple Amateurs	1
Bideford Reserves	1
Bude Town	1
Holy Trinity (Barnstaple)	1
Minehead	1
Morwenstow	1
Pilton, Yeo Vale	1
Tiverton	1
