= Stroud and District Football League =

Association football league in England

- Founded: 1902
- Country: England
- Divisions: 8
- Number of clubs: 93
- Promotion to: Gloucestershire Northern Senior League Division Two
- League cup(s): Stroud and District Football League Cup Competition (6 cup and shield trophies)
- Current champions: Wickwar Wanderers (2024-25)
- Website: Official Website – stroudleague.co.uk League Tables – TheFA.com

The Stroud and District Football League is a football competition based in England. The league was established in 1902 and is affiliated to the Gloucestershire County FA. It has a total of eight divisions.

Wickwar Wanderers were League Champions for the 2024–25 season and were subsequently promoted to the Gloucestershire Northern Senior League (GNSL).

The League are currently sponsored by Bateman's Sports (based in central Stroud).

== History ==
The Stroud and District League was founded in 1902 and serves the central (or mid) part of Gloucestershire from Gloucester and Churchdown in the north, to Cirencester in the east, to Wickwar and Sherston in the south. The League's geographical area is within a 20-mile road radius of central Stroud, GL5 1AD.

The first ever winners of the league were Brimscombe.

Among the clubs that have left the S&DFL and now compete at a National League System level are:

- Brimscombe (now known as Brimscombe & Thrupp)
- Forest Green Rovers
- Longlevens
- Shortwood United
- Slimbridge
- Stonehouse Town
- Thornbury Town
- Tuffley Rovers

== Member clubs 2025–26 ==
Division One - 14 teams
Abbeymead Rovers, Chalford Reserves, Dursley Town Reserves, Gala Wilton Reserves, Horsley United, Minchinhampton, Old Richians, Shortwood United Reserves, Stratton United, Stroud United, Taverners, Tetbury Town, Tuffley Rovers Reserves, Wotton Rovers

Division Two - 14 teams
Brimscombe & Thrupp Reserves, Brockworth Albion Reserves, Cam Bulldogs, Dursley Town 3rds, Hardwicke Reserves, Kingswood, Longlevens 3rds, Minety, Randwick, Sharpness Reserves, Sherston Town, Siddington Athletic, Tuffley Rovers 3rds, Upton St Leonards

Division Three - 22 teams
North Section - Barnwood United Reserves, Boss FC, Cotswold Rangers, Hardwicke 3rds, Kings Stanley Reserves, Leonard Stanley, Longlevens 4ths, Mavericks, Quedgeley Wanderers Reserves, Rising Stars, Stonehouse Town 3rds
South Section - Cam Everside Wanderers, Chalford 3rds, Charfield Reserves, Frampton United 3rds, Longlevens 5ths, Minchinhampton Reserves, Rodborough Old Boys, Sharpness 3rds, Stratton United Reserves, Tetbury Town Reserves, Uley

Division Four - 22 teams
North Section - Abbeymead Rovers Reserves, AFC Renegades, Brockworth Albion 3rds, Coney Hill, Gala Wilton 3rds, Longford, Old Richians Reserves, Painswick 3rds, Stroud United Reserves, Trident, Tuffley Rovers 4ths
South Section - Abbeymead Rovers 3rds, Berkeley Town Reserves, Cam Bulldogs Reserves, Dursley Town 4ths, Nailsworth Town, Painswick Reserves, Randwick Reserves, Sherston Town Reserves, Taverners Reserves, Wickwar Wanderers Reserves, Wotton Rovers Reserves

Division Five - 21 teams
North Section - Abbeymead Rovers 4ths, Alkerton Rangers Reserves, Barnwood United 3rds, Hunts Grove, Longford Reserves, Mavericks Reserves, Painswick 4ths, Rising Star Reserves, Twigworth Green, Upton St Leonards Reserves
South Section - Alkerton Rangers, Berkeley Town 3rds, Cam Bulldogs 3rds, Chalford 4ths, Horsley United Reserves, Kingswood Reserves, Leonard Stanley 3rds, Minchinhampton Juniors, Minety Reserves, Randwick Reserves, Uley Reserves

== Champions & Division Winners ==
1902–03: Brimscombe

Season	Division One	Division Two	Division Three	Division Four
2009–10	Frampton United	Stonehouse Town Res	Slimbridge Res	Abbeymead Rovers Res
2010–11	Abbeymead Rovers	Gloucester Civil Service	Upton St Leonards	Didmarton
2011–12	Tuffley Rovers Res	Upton St Leonards	Avonvale United	Wickwar Wanderers
2012–13	Quedgeley Wanderers	Avonvale United	AFC Phoenix	Stroud Harriers
2013–14	Avonvale United	Frampton United Res	Sharpness Res	Longlevens 3rds
2014–15	Longlevens Res	Stroud Harriers	St Nicholas Old Boys	Tuffley Rovers 3rds
2015–16	Stroud Harriers	Stroud United	Cam Bulldogs Res	Rodborough Old Boys
2016–17	Upton St Leonards	Kingswood Res	Minchinhampton	Ramblers
2017–18	Barnwood United	Rodborough Old Boys	Ramblers	Tredworth Tigers Res
2018–19	Kings Stanley	Didmarton	Kingsway Rovers	Charfield Res
2019–20	Dursley Town	Chesterton	Horsley United	Painswick
2020–21	Not Awarded	Not Awarded	Not Awarded	Not Awarded
2021–22	Tredworth Tigers	Wotton Rovers	Painswick	Dursley Town Res
2022–23	Rodborough Old Boys	Painswick	Dursley Town Res	Longlevens 4ths
2023-24	Painswick	Dursley Town Res	Longlevens 4ths	Ramblers (N), Dursley Town 3rds (S)
2024-25	Wickwar Wanderers	Abbeymead Rovers	Dursley Town 3rds	Charfield Res (S, Longlevens 5ths (N)
2025-26	Old Richians	Cam Bulldogs	Longlevens 5ths (S), Rising Stars (N)	Nailsworth Town (S), Tuffley Rovers 4ths (N)

Season	Division Five	Division Six	Division Seven	Division Eight
2008–09	Matchplay Reeves	Ramblers 3rds	Tredworth Tigers	Bush
2009–10	Didmarton	Stroud Imperial	Hardwicke Res	McCadam
2010–11	Stroud Imperial	Bush	McCadam	Kingsholm
2011–12	Stroud Harriers	Upton St Leonards Res	Cotswold Rangers	Trident
2012–13	Avonvale United Res	St Nicholas Old Boys	Trident	Tuffley Rovers 4ths
2013–14	St Nicholas Old Boys	Alkerton Rangers	Hawkesbury Stallions	Alkerton Rangers Res
2014–15	Trident	The Village	Chalford 3rds	
2015–16	Wickwar Wanderers	Longlevens 4ths	Kingsway Rovers	
2016–17	Kingsway Rovers	Painswick	Bridgeway	
2017–18	Charfield Res	North Nibley	Cotswold Rangers Res	
2018–19	North Nibley	Cashes Green	Ramblers Res	
2019–20	Berkeley Town Res	Stroud United	Cam Everside Wanderers	
2020–21	Not Awarded	Not Awarded	Not Awarded	
2021-22	Sherston Town	Longlevens 5ths	Robinswood Athletic	Rising Stars
2022-23	Leonard Stanley Reserves	Brockworth Albion 3rds		
2023–24	Mavericks	Dursley Town 4ths		
2024-25	Longlevens 5ths (N) Charfield Reserves (S)	AFC Renegades (N), Abbeymead Rovers Res (S)	Barnwood United 3rds	

== League Cup Winners ==
(this replaced the Stroud & District Charity Cup Competition run for over 100 years)

Season	Presidents Cup	Chairmans Cup	Dennis Mason Cup	Fred Gardiner Shield	Bill Bick Cup	Derek Freebury Shield
2018–19	Kings Stanley	Minchinhampton	North Nibley	Abbeymead Rovers Res	Cashes Green	Cotswold Rangers Res
2019–20	Not Completed	Not Completed	North Nibley	Not Completed	Brockworth Albion 3rds	Not Completed
2020–21	Not Played	Not Played	Not Played	Not Played	Not Played	Not Played
2021–22	Minchinhampton	North Nibley	Gala Wilton 3rds	Berkeley Town Res	Robinswood Athletic	Ramblers Res
2022–23	Minety	Cam Bulldogs	South Cerney	Trident	Tetbury Town Res	Gala Wilton 4ths
2023–24	Chalford Res	Abbeymead Rovers	Longlevens 4ths	Rising Stars	Longlevens 5ths	Dursley Town 4ths
2024–25	Tetbury Town	Sharpness Res	Charfield Res	Longlevens 5ths	AFC Renegades	Wotton Rovers Res

In 2018–19, the Fred Gardiner and the Derek Freebury Shields were the former Section 'B' and 'D' Plate Competitions respectively.

Additional cups run:-

Harry Greening Trophy, won by Frampton United in 2018-19

Section ‘A’ (Plate Competition), won by Old Richians in 2018-19 and Gala Wilton Reserves in 2021-22

Section ‘C’ (Plate Competition), won by Gloster Rovers in 2019-20 and Minchinhampton Reserves in 2021-22
