= Liverpool Football League =

Association football league in Merseyside, England

Liverpool Football league
- Founded: 1923 (as Liverpool Old Boys Amateur League); 2024 (renamed in 2024 as The Liverpool Football league)
- Country: England
- Divisions: 4
- Number of clubs: 48; Premier Division : 13; Championship Division : 13; Division One : 10; Division Two : 12
- Current champions: Mersey Harps 1 (Premiership); ACOL First (Championship); Mexoc (League One); Kingsford Larkin (League Two) (2024–25)
- Website: Liverpool Football League

The Liverpool Football League is a football competition based in Merseyside, England. It was founded in 1923 as Liverpool Old Boys Amateur League by a group of former players from Liverpool FC.

The league initially had just four clubs, but it has since grown to become one of the largest amateur football leagues in Merseyside. The league has been home to some notable players over the years, including Bill Shankly, Bob Paisley, and Kenny Dalglish.

After running for 100 years (1923-2023), the league was relaunched in 2024 as The Liverpool Football league.

The league operates four divisions; the Premier Division, the Championship Division, the League One Division and the League Two Division.

The league has six knockout cup competitions:

- The Liverpool Football league Cup is open to all clubs across the four divisions.
- The Liverpool Football league Trophy is open to clubs knocked out of the preliminary (1st) Round of the Liverpool Football league Cup.
- The Marlborough Trophy is open to clubs in the Premier Division.
- The Alan Brown Trophy is open to clubs in the Championship Division.
- The Connerty Cup is open to clubs in the League One Division.
- The Bushell Cup is open to clubs in the League Two Division.

== Member clubs 2025–26 ==
=== Premier Division ===
- Bridge Cathinians
- Cheshire Lines
- FC Alder 1st
- FC Salle 1st
- Haroldeans
- Huyton Cons
- Huyton Stanley
- Liverpool Ramblers 1st
- Mersey Harps 1
- Old Xaverians 1st
- St Margaret's OB
- Valley
- Victoria FC

=== Championship Division ===
- Alumni First
- Barry's Lodge FC
- BRNESC
- Childwall Abbey FC
- Kingfisher FC
- Mersey Harps 2
- Mexoc
- Mossley Hill Athletic LFL
- MSB Woolton U23
- Old Xaverians A Team
- River FC 2nds
- Saltbox FC
- Sefton OA

=== League One Division ===
- ACOL
- Collegiate Old Boys
- Forefield Rangers First
- Kingsford Larkin
- Liobians 1st
- North Hill FC
- Old Xaverians B Team
- Rainhill FC
- Sacre Coeur Former Pupils
- Sefton Park Rangers 2

=== League Two Division ===
- AFC SWAN
- Bankhall FC
- Albert Rovers FC
- Alumni Res.
- Childwall Abbey Res.
- Convocation
- Dynamo Childwall-Rhein
- Liobians 2nd
- Liverpool Ramblers 2nd
- Manwell AFC
- Merseyside County FC
- Waterloo GSOB First

== Champions ==
as Liverpool Old Boys Amateur League
Season	Division 1	Division 2	Division 3	Division 4
2013–14	Quarry Bank OB Res.	Old Bootleians	Hope Park 1st	Old Xaverians 'A'
2014–15	Quarry Bank OB Res.	Roby College OB First	Quarry Bank OB 'A'	Oakes Institute OB
2015–16	Bankfield OB	Old English	ACOL 2nds	De La Salle OB
2016–17	Quarry Bank OB Res.	Waterloo GSOB Res.	Waterloo GSOB 'A'	Collegiate Old Boys B
2017–18	Alumni Reserves	St Margaret's OB	Quarry Bank OB 'A'	DLS
	Division 1	Division 2	Division 3	
2018–19	Quarry Bank OB Reserves	Oakes Institute	Woodstreet Reserves	
2019–20	Season declared null and void due to COVID-19			
2020-21	South Liverpool 3rd Team	KCC Old Boys	Collegiate Old Boys A	
	Division 1	Division 2	Division 3	Division 4
2021–22	FC Salle First	Valley OB Reserves	Alumni Reserve 2	Netherley Athletic First
	Premier	Championship	League One	League Two
2022–23	Abbey Road	Old Xaverians B Team	Redgate Rovers First	ACOL Academy
2023–24	Mersey Harps 1	Cheshire Lines	Kingfisher FC	Old Xaverians B Team
as Liverpool Football League
	Premier	Championship	League One	League Two
2024–25	Mersey Harps 1	ACOL First	Mexoc	Kingsford Larkin
