= 2021–22 Northern Counties East Football League =

The 2021–22 Northern Counties East Football League season was the 40th in the history of Northern Counties East Football League, a football competition in England.

The allocations for the league this season were announced by The Football Association (The FA) on 18 May 2021.

After the abandonment of the 2019–20 and 2020–21 seasons due to the COVID-19 pandemic in England, numerous promotions were decided on a points per game basis over the previous two seasons.

== Premier Division ==
Northern Counties East Football League Premier Division
- Season: 2021–22
- Champions: Grimsby Borough
- Promoted: Grimsby Borough
- Relegated: Staveley Miners Welfare; Athersley Recreation
- Matches: 380
- Goals: 1,314 (3.46 per match)

The Premier Division featured 17 clubs which competed in the previous season, along with three new clubs:

- Emley, promoted from Division One
- Sherwood Colliery, promoted from the East Midlands Counties League
- Winterton Rangers, promoted from Division One

=== League table ===
Pos	Team	Pld	W	D	L	GF	GA	GD	Pts	Promotion, qualification or relegation
1	Grimsby Borough	38	27	7	4	102	43	+59	88	Promoted to the Northern Premier League
2	Eccleshill United	38	24	7	7	90	48	+42	79	Qualified for the inter-step play-off (Note: Contested an inter-step play-off match as one of the bottom six runners-up from Step 5 with the most points per game (PPG) against a third-from-bottom club out of six from Step 4 with the fewest PPG. The winner stayed at Step 4 for the 2022–23 season, while the loser remained at Step 5. If a runner-up did not meet the minimum participation criteria, a club in the next eligible position between second and seventh would have played instead.)
3	Garforth Town	38	23	8	7	81	39	+42	77	
4	Winterton Rangers	38	24	4	10	90	43	+47	76	
5	Sherwood Colliery	38	22	7	9	76	49	+27	73	Transferred to the United Counties League
6	Penistone Church	38	19	9	10	67	47	+20	66	
7	Barton Town	38	16	13	9	70	57	+13	61	
8	Handsworth	38	19	3	16	71	67	+4	60	
9	Emley	38	13	12	13	65	57	+8	51	
10	Staveley Miners Welfare	38	16	2	20	68	58	+10	50	Voluntary relegation to Division One (Note: Staveley Miners Welfare applied for a placement in Division One for financial reasons. They assumed the bottom position for relegation purposes.)
11	Maltby Main	38	14	7	17	57	60	−3	49	
12	Goole	38	14	7	17	58	68	−10	49	
13	Silsden	38	12	10	16	69	74	−5	46	
14	Bottesford Town	38	14	4	20	44	74	−30	46	
15	Thackley	38	13	5	20	59	85	−26	44	
16	AFC Mansfield	38	10	11	17	44	60	−16	41	Transferred to the United Counties League
17	Knaresborough Town	38	12	4	22	62	87	−25	40	
18	Hemsworth Miners Welfare	38	8	9	21	70	97	−27	33	
19	Albion Sports	38	10	3	25	47	79	−32	33	
20	Athersley Recreation	38	2	4	32	24	122	−98	10	Relegated to Division One (Note: Relegated as one of four clubs with the fewest PPG out of 16 that were second-from-bottom in Step 5.)

Source: Northern Counties East Football League
Rules for classification: 1) points; 2) goal difference; 3) number of goals scored; 4) number of matches won; 5) head-to-head results

==== Inter-step play-off ====
30 April 2022	Kempston Rovers	2–2 (a.e.t.) (5–4 p)	Eccleshill United	Hillgrounds, Kempston
15:00 (UTC+01:00)	Hayford 37'; Baker 68'		Bradley 50'; Cissa 56'	Attendance: 184

=== Stadia and locations ===
Location of the clubs in the NCEL
Premier Division on a map of
Yorkshire and the Humber

Club	Stadium	Capacity
Albion Sports	Throstle Nest (Note: home of Farsley Celtic (groundshare))	3,500
Athersley Recreation	Sheerien Park	2,000
Barton Town	Euronics Ground	3,000
Bottesford Town	Birch Park	1,000
Eccleshill United	Kings Way	2,225
Emley	Welfare Ground	2,000
Garforth Town	Wheatley Park	3,000
Goole	Victoria Pleasure Grounds	3,000
Grimsby Borough	Bradley Football Centre	1,000
Handsworth	Sandy Lane	2,500
Hemsworth Miners Welfare	Fitzwilliam Stadium	2,000
Knaresborough Town	Manse Lane	1,000
Maltby Main	Muglet Lane	2,000
AFC Mansfield	Forest Town Stadium	
Penistone Church	Church View Road	1,000
Sherwood Colliery	Debdale Park	
Silsden	Keighley Road Stadium	1,500
Staveley Miners Welfare	Inkersall Road	5,000
Thackley	Dennyfield	3,000
Winterton Rangers	West Street	3,000

== Division One ==
Northern Counties East Football League Division One
- Season: 2021–22
- Champions: Hallam
- Promoted: Hallam; North Ferriby
- Relegated: Hall Road Rangers; Teversal
- Matches: 420
- Goals: 1,642 (3.91 per match)

Division One featured 16 clubs which competed in the previous season, along with five new clubs, transferred from the East Midlands Counties League:

- Clipstone
- Ollerton Town
- Rainworth Miners Welfare
- Shirebrook Town
- Teversal

Also, East Hull were renamed as FC Humber United.

=== League table ===
Pos	Team	Pld	W	D	L	GF	GA	GD	Pts	Promotion, qualification or relegation
1	Hallam	40	33	3	4	146	43	+103	102	Promoted to the Premier Division
2	North Ferriby	40	30	6	4	100	27	+73	96	Qualified for the play-offs, then promoted to the Premier Division
3	Brigg Town	40	28	2	10	131	60	+71	86	Qualified for the play-offs
4	Harrogate Railway Athletic	40	26	5	9	89	48	+41	83	Qualified for the play-offs
5	Rossington Main	40	25	6	9	94	49	+45	81	Qualified for the play-offs
6	Selby Town	40	22	9	9	107	69	+38	75	
7	Retford	40	21	5	14	81	68	+13	68	
8	Parkgate	40	20	6	14	86	71	+15	66	
9	Worsbrough Bridge Athletic	40	17	4	19	65	84	−19	55	
10	Hall Road Rangers	40	17	3	20	74	79	−5	54	Demoted to the Humber Premier League
11	Dronfield Town	40	16	6	18	68	78	−10	54	
12	Ollerton Town	40	14	11	15	75	75	0	53	
13	Armthorpe Welfare	40	15	7	18	79	73	+6	52	
14	Nostell Miners Welfare	40	14	8	18	63	86	−23	50	
15	Shirebrook Town	40	13	8	19	58	82	−24	47	
16	Rainworth Miners Welfare	40	12	7	21	54	83	−29	43	Transferred to the United Counties League
17	Glasshoughton Welfare	40	11	8	21	59	74	−15	41	
18	Swallownest	40	7	10	23	48	80	−32	31	
19	FC Humber United	40	7	6	27	79	143	−64	27	Club folded (Note: All third-from-bottom clubs at Step 6 were reprieved from relegation. The two second-from-bottom sides with the fewest PPG were relegated. FC Humber United eventually withdrew before the next season.)
20	Clipstone	40	6	4	30	49	124	−75	22	Reprieved from relegation, then transferred to the United Counties League
21	Teversal	40	2	4	34	37	146	−109	10	Relegated to the Central Midlands League

Source: Northern Counties East Football League
Rules for classification: 1) points; 2) goal difference; 3) number of goals scored; 4) number of matches won; 5) head-to-head results

=== Play-offs ===
Semifinals
2	North Ferriby	2
5	Rossington Main	0
3	Brigg Town	1
4	Harrogate Railway Athletic	2

Final
2	North Ferriby	3
4	Harrogate Railway Athletic	2

==== Semifinals ====
16 April 2022	Brigg Town	1–2	Harrogate Railway Athletic	Brigg
	Peat 60'	Report	Crosby 17', 35'	Stadium: The Hawthorns; Attendance: 623

16 April 2022	North Ferriby	2–0	Rossington Main	North Ferriby
	Mundy 35' (o.g.); Whiteley 38'	Report		Stadium: The Versa Sportswear Stadium; Attendance: 901

==== Final ====
23 April 2022	North Ferriby	3–2	Harrogate Railway Athletic	North Ferriby
	Donald 2'; Clarke 67'; Tilsley 84'	Report	Day 50'; Ibrahimi 69'	Stadium: The Versa Sportswear Stadium; Attendance: 1,442

=== Stadia and locations ===
Location of the clubs in the 2021–22
NCEL Division One on a map of
Yorkshire and the Humber

Club	Stadium	Capacity
Armthorpe Welfare	Welfare Ground	2,500
Brigg Town	The Hawthorns	2,500
Clipstone	Lido Ground	500
Dronfield Town	Stonelow Ground	500
Glasshoughton Welfare	Glasshoughton Centre	2,000
Hallam	Sandygate Road	1,000
Hall Road Rangers	Haworth Park	1,200
Harrogate Railway Athletic	Station View	3,500
FC Humber United	Dene Park	2,000
North Ferriby	The Dransfield Stadium	3,000
Nostell Miners Welfare	The Welfare Ground	1,500
Ollerton Town	Walesby Lane Sports Ground	
Parkgate	Roundwood Sports Complex	1,000
Rainworth Miners Welfare	Welfare Ground	2,201
Retford	The Rail	1,000
Rossington Main	Welfare Ground	2,000
Selby Town	Richard Street	5,000
Shirebrook Town	Langwith Road	2,000
Swallownest	Miners Welfare Ground	
Teversal	Teversal Grange Sports and Social Centre	2,000
Worsbrough Bridge Athletic	Park Road	2,000

== League Cup ==
2021–22 Northern Counties East Football League League Cup
Tournament details
- Country: England
- Teams: 41

Final positions
- Champions: Barton Town
- Runners-up: Garforth Town

The 2021–22 Northern Counties East Football League League Cup was the 40th season of the league cup competition of the Northern Counties East Football League.
