= 2024–25 United Counties League =

United Counties League
- Season: 2024–25

The 2024–25 season is the 118th in the history of the United Counties League, a football competition in England. The United Counties League operates three divisions in the English football league system, the Premier Divisions North and South at Step 5 and Division One at Step 6.

The allocations for Steps 5 and 6 this season were announced by The Football Association on 17 May 2024. After the allocations were announced Coalville Town FC withdrew from Step 3 football and were given permission to join the United Counties League Division One.

== Premier Division North ==
United Counties League Premier Division North
- Season: 2024–25
- Champions: Lincoln United
- Promoted: Lincoln United; Bourne Town
- Relegated: Sleaford Town; Shirebrook Town
- Matches: 380
- Goals: 1,224 (3.22 per match)
- Top goalscorer: Harry Limb (Boston Town) (28 goals)
- Biggest home win: Lincoln United 6–0 Sleaford Town (15 February 2025)
- Biggest away win: Harrowby United 1–8 Eastwood (27 July 2024)
- Highest scoring: Melton Town 6–4 Harrowby United (10 August 2024)

At the end of the 2023–24 season, three teams left the division:

- Loughborough Students, promoted to the Northern Premier League
- Pinchbeck United, relegated to the Eastern Counties League Division One North
- Sherwood Colliery, promoted to the Northern Premier League

Before the 2024–25 season, five teams joined the division:

- Bourne Town, promoted from Division One
- Gresley Rovers, relegated from the Northern Premier League Division One Midlands
- Harrowby United, promoted from Division One
- Newark Town, promoted from Division One
- Shirebrook Town, promoted from the Northern Counties East League Division One

=== League table ===
Pos	Team	Pld	W	D	L	GF	GA	GD	Pts	Promotion, qualification or relegation
1	Lincoln United (C, P)	38	25	8	5	83	40	+43	83	Promotion to the Northern Premier League
2	Bourne Town (O, P)	38	26	4	8	79	35	+44	82	Qualification for the play-offs
3	Eastwood	38	25	5	8	93	44	+49	80	Qualification for the play-offs
4	Boston Town	38	24	5	9	70	35	+35	77	Qualification for the play-offs
5	AFC Mansfield	38	22	6	10	66	44	+22	72	Qualification for the play-offs
6	Heanor Town	38	21	6	11	77	53	+24	69	
7	Newark Town	38	18	11	9	79	62	+17	65	
8	Belper United	38	19	3	16	76	63	+13	60	
9	Ashby Ivanhoe	38	17	4	17	66	50	+16	55	
10	Skegness Town	38	12	10	16	48	45	+3	46	
11	Melton Town	38	13	7	18	63	65	−2	46	
12	Hucknall Town	38	13	7	18	53	61	−8	46	
13	Newark and Sherwood United	38	13	7	18	56	69	−13	46	
14	Harrowby United	38	14	4	20	55	73	−18	46	
15	Wisbech Town	38	12	6	20	47	81	−34	42	
16	Deeping Rangers	38	11	6	21	40	80	−40	39	
17	Kimberley Miners Welfare	38	10	5	23	52	76	−24	35	
18	Gresley Rovers	38	9	7	22	56	83	−27	34	
19	Sleaford Town (R)	38	9	7	22	38	76	−38	34	Relegation to Division One
20	Shirebrook Town (R)	38	5	6	27	27	89	−62	21	Relegation to Division One

Source: The FA Full-Time
Rules for classification: 1) points; 2) goal difference; 3) number of goals scored; 4) number of matches won; 5) head-to-head results
(C) Champions; (O) Play-off winners; (P) Promoted; (R) Relegated

=== Play-offs ===
Semi-finals
2	Bourne Town	4
5	AFC Mansfield	0
3	Eastwood	1
4	Boston Town	2

Final
2	Bourne Town	1(8)
4	Boston Town	1(7)

==== Semifinals ====
26 April	Bourne Town	4–0	AFC Mansfield	Bourne
15:00	Siddons 6', 34'; Allen 76' (pen.); Wilson 90+8'	Report		Stadium: Abbey Lawn; Attendance: 819; Referee: Aimee Keir

26 April	Eastwood	1–2	Boston Town	Eastwood
15:00	Opoku 74'	Report	10' (o.g.); Limb 61'	Stadium: Coronation Park; Attendance: 354; Referee: Lewis Saunders-Johnson

==== Final ====
3 May	Bourne Town	1–1 (8–7 p)	Boston Town	Bourne
15:00 GMT	Marshall 75'	Report	Nuttell 31'	Stadium: Abbey Lawn; Attendance: 1,781; Referee: Thomas Kennedy
	Penalties
	Penalty scored Penalty missed		Limb (penalty scored); Maddison (penalty scored); Smith (penalty scored); Tate (penalty missed); Adams (penalty scored); Burdass (penalty scored); Wilson (penalty scored)

=== Results table ===
Home \ Away	MAN	ASH	BEL	BOS	BOU	DEE	EAS	GRE	HAR	HEA	HUC	KMW	LIN	MEL	N&S	NEW	SHI	SKE	SLE	WIS
AFC Mansfield	—	0–2	2–1	2–0	1–2	2–1	0–3	2–0	2–1	2–3	1–1	0–0	0–1	1–0	1–2	1–1	5–0	1–0	2–1	5–0
Ashby Ivanhoe	1–2	—	5–0	1–3	0–4	5–0	5–2	3–1	0–1	0–2	0–1	4–0	6–2	1–0	1–0	4–0	3–1	2–1	2–0	2–3
Belper United	2–1	4–1	—	2–3	0–1	3–0	2–1	2–3	2–0	1–3	1–2	3–2	1–1	2–2	3–1	2–2	2–0	1–3	0–1	1–0
Boston Town	2–1	1–3	2–1	—	0–1	3–0	0–3	3–0	1–0	1–0	3–0	2–0	0–1	4–1	2–2	3–0	4–0	0–0	2–0	5–0
Bourne Town	1–2	2–0	2–1	1–0	—	3–0	1–0	1–1	3–0	2–3	3–2	0–1	0–3	3–1	4–0	1–1	5–0	0–3	1–0	5–0
Deeping Rangers	1–6	0–0	2–4	1–1	1–2	—	0–2	1–0	1–0	0–3	3–2	4–1	1–2	1–0	1–0	1–0	3–0	1–1	4–1	1–1
Eastwood	2–0	3–1	0–3	1–0	1–3	5–0	—	1–1	5–1	3–1	1–3	4–0	2–2	1–1	1–4	2–2	5–0	1–0	2–0	3–0
Gresley Rovers	2–3	1–1	1–2	1–2	0–2	0–2	2–3	—	0–4	3–2	4–1	4–1	1–3	1–5	0–3	1–2	3–1	5–1	1–1	1–0
Harrowby United	5–0	2–1	0–2	1–5	0–2	4–0	1–8	2–1	—	2–3	1–1	0–3	1–1	0–1	2–1	1–4	2–1	0–3	2–0	4–0
Heanor Town	1–1	2–0	2–3	0–1	2–1	1–2	2–2	0–0	5–1	—	4–1	2–1	1–2	4–2	2–0	3–0	2–1	2–1	2–0	0–1
Hucknall Town	1–2	1–0	2–5	2–1	2–3	2–1	1–2	3–0	0–0	1–3	—	0–3	1–3	3–0	3–0	1–2	0–0	0–0	1–1	1–0
Kimberley Miners Welfare	0–4	0–1	3–2	1–1	1–2	6–1	1–3	3–3	2–3	2–2	1–0	—	1–2	2–0	2–3	1–4	1–2	0–1	4–0	1–2
Lincoln United	1–1	2–1	6–1	3–0	2–1	2–1	0–1	2–0	2–1	3–1	1–2	5–1	—	2–1	0–0	1–2	3–2	1–1	6–0	3–2
Melton Town	0–1	1–1	1–0	1–1	1–2	4–1	1–5	3–2	6–4	1–2	1–6	3–1	1–1	—	4–0	1–2	5–0	1–1	1–1	0–2
Newark and Sherwood United	1–3	2–0	0–3	1–2	2–4	2–0	0–1	2–3	2–2	3–1	2–1	2–0	3–2	1–3	—	2–2	2–0	1–4	0–0	5–2
Newark Town	2–3	1–1	1–0	1–2	2–2	2–2	2–4	4–4	1–0	2–4	4–1	2–2	0–4	3–2	4–0	—	4–0	4–0	3–1	5–2
Shirebrook Town	1–2	2–1	2–5	1–4	1–5	2–0	0–4	3–1	1–2	0–3	1–1	0–1	0–2	1–2	1–1	0–1	—	0–0	0–1	1–1
Skegness Town	0–1	0–2	1–0	0–1	0–0	2–2	1–2	2–0	0–1	4–1	2–1	1–3	0–0	0–3	1–1	1–2	3–1	—	1–2	1–2
Sleaford Town	1–2	1–0	2–3	2–3	0–4	4–0	1–3	2–4	2–1	1–1	1–0	3–0	2–5	1–0	3–5	0–3	0–0	0–3	—	1–1
Wisbech Town	1–1	2–5	2–6	0–2	1–0	2–0	2–1	5–1	1–3	2–2	1–2	1–0	0–1	1–3	1–0	2–2	0–1	0–5	4–1	—

Source: FA Full-Time Grid
Legend: Blue = home team win; Yellow = draw; Red = away team win.
For upcoming matches, an "a" indicates there is an article about the rivalry between the two participants.

=== Stadia and locations ===
Location of the clubs in the 2024–25 United Counties League Premier Division North

Club	Location	Stadium	Capacity
Ashby Ivanhoe	Ashby-de-la-Zouch	NFU Sports Ground	
Belper United	Eastwood	Coronation Park	
Eastwood	Eastwood	Coronation Park	
Boston Town	Boston	Tattershall Road	6,000
Bourne Town	Bourne	Abbey Lawn	2,000
Deeping Rangers	Market Deeping	Haydon Whitham Stadium	2,000
Gresley Rovers	Church Gresley	Moat Ground	2,400
Harrowby United	Grantham	Dickens Road	
Heanor Town	Heanor	Town Ground	2,700
Hucknall Town	Hucknall	RM Stadium	4,000
Kimberley Miners Welfare	Kimberley	Stag Ground	
Lincoln United	Lincoln	Ashby Avenue	2,200
AFC Mansfield	Mansfield (Forest Town)	Forest Town Stadium	
Melton Town	Melton Mowbray	Melton Sports Village	
Newark and Sherwood United	Grantham	Dickens Road	
Newark Town	Newark-on-Trent	YMCA Sports Village	
Shirebrook Town	Shirebrook	Langwith Road	2,000
Skegness Town	Skegness	Vertigo Stadium	
Sleaford Town	Sleaford	Eslaforde Park	1,000
Wisbech Town	Wisbech	Fenland Stadium	1,118

== Premier Division South ==
United Counties League Premier Division South
- Season: 2024–25
- Champions: St Neots Town
- Promoted: St Neots Town; Rugby Borough
- Relegated: GNG Oadby Town; Godmanchester Rovers
- Matches: 342
- Goals: 1,255 (3.67 per match)
- Top goalscorer: Victor Osobu (Eynesbury Rovers) (28 goals)
- Biggest home win: Aylestone Park 7–1 Coventry United (26 July 2024); St Neots Town 8–2 Godmanchester Rovers (2 November 2024); Aylestone Park 7–1 Newport Pagnell Town (16 November 2024); St Neots Town 6–0 Leicester Nirvana (23 November 2024); March Town United 6–0 Lutterworth Town (4 January 2025)
- Biggest away win: Daventry Town 0–5 Aylestone Park (10 September 2024); GNG Oadby Town 0–5 Histon (28 September 2024); Godmanchester Rovers 0–5 Newport Pagnell Town (12 November 2024); Bugbrooke St Michaels 0–5 St Neots Town (15 February 2025); Northampton Sileby Rangers 1–6 Daventry Town (8 March 2025); Bugbrooke St Michaels 0–5 Coventry United (29 March 2025)
- Highest scoring: St Neots Town 8–2 Godmanchester Rovers (2 November 2024)

At the end of the 2023–24 season, four teams left the division:

- Cogenhoe United, resigned from the league
- Desborough Town, relegated to the Spartan South Midlands League Division One
- Racing Club Warwick, promoted to the Northern Premier League
- Wellingborough Town, promoted to the Northern Premier League

Before the 2024–25 season, three teams joined the division:

- Hinckley, promoted from the Midland League Division One
- Northampton ON Chenecks, promoted from the Spartan South Midlands League Division One
- Northampton Sileby Rangers, promoted from the Spartan South Midlands League Division One

=== League table ===
Pos	Team	Pld	W	D	L	GF	GA	GD	Pts	Promotion, qualification or relegation
1	St Neots Town (C, P)	36	28	3	5	103	39	+64	87	Promotion to the Northern Premier League
2	Aylestone Park	36	23	5	8	92	45	+47	74	Qualification for the play-offs
3	Rugby Borough (O, P)	36	20	7	9	76	40	+36	67	Qualification for the play-offs
4	March Town United	36	18	10	8	70	40	+30	64	Qualification for the play-offs
5	Eynesbury Rovers	36	19	6	11	76	57	+19	63	Qualification for the play-offs
6	Newport Pagnell Town	36	20	3	13	69	58	+11	63	
7	Coventry United	36	19	5	12	89	63	+26	62	
8	Daventry Town	36	16	10	10	65	53	+12	58	
9	Hinckley	36	16	6	14	75	64	+11	54	
10	Leicester Nirvana	36	16	5	15	62	66	−4	53	
11	Northampton ON Chenecks	36	14	10	12	67	63	+4	52	
12	Histon	36	13	7	16	57	62	−5	46	
13	Northampton Sileby Rangers	36	12	7	17	62	79	−17	43	
14	Easington Sports	36	11	5	20	45	71	−26	38	
15	Lutterworth Town	36	10	5	21	50	79	−29	35	
16	Bugbrooke St Michaels	36	10	5	21	52	83	−31	35	
17	Yaxley	36	10	4	22	60	91	−31	34	
18	GNG Oadby Town	36	8	3	25	44	99	−55	27	
19	Godmanchester Rovers	36	4	4	28	41	103	−62	16	Reprived from relegation (Note: Godmanchester Rovers were reprieved from relegation due to the resignation of Hinckley LRFC from the Northern Premier League Division One Midlands.)

Source: The FA Full-Time
Rules for classification: 1) points; 2) goal difference; 3) number of goals scored; 4) number of matches won; 5) head-to-head results
(C) Champions; (O) Play-off winners; (P) Promoted

=== Play-offs ===
Semi-finals
2	Aylestone Park	5
5	Eynesbury Rovers	0
3	Rugby Borough	2
4	March Town United	0

Final
2	Aylestone Park	1
3	Rugby Borough	2

==== Semifinals ====
26 April 2025	Aylestone Park	5–0	Eynesbury Rovers	Leicester
15:00	Armeni 15', 69', 75'; Hollis 65'; Ellis 80'	Report		Stadium: Saffron Lane; Attendance: 361; Referee: David Brennan

27 April 2025	Rugby Borough	2–0	March Town United	Rugby
15:00	Grocott 29'; McGahey 80'	Report		Stadium: Kilsby Lane; Attendance: 294; Referee: Ali Cera

==== Final ====
3 May	Aylestone Park	1–2	Rugby Borough	Leicester
15:00	Armeni 5'	Report	Wilson 3'; Fitzgerald 27'	Stadium: Saffron Lane; Attendance: 1,144; Referee: Daniel Miller

=== Results table ===
Home \ Away	AYP	BSM	CVU	DAV	EAS	EYN	GNG	GOD	HIN	HIS	LEI	LUT	MTU	NPT	NOC	NSR	RUG	STN	YAX
Aylestone Park	—	3–0	7–1	3–3	4–2	3–1	4–0	4–1	4–1	3–1	1–3	4–3	0–3	7–1	1–1	2–1	4–0	0–2	3–1
Bugbrooke St Michaels	2–3	—	0–5	1–1	0–1	2–3	1–2	3–1	3–1	2–1	2–6	2–0	2–2	2–3	1–0	0–2	0–3	0–5	3–2
Coventry United	1–1	1–1	—	1–5	2–0	1–1	5–1	3–1	4–1	6–1	5–1	2–1	2–0	2–0	1–2	5–1	1–4	2–1	6–1
Daventry Town	0–5	4–2	0–4	—	0–0	5–1	3–3	2–0	1–3	0–2	4–1	4–3	1–1	0–0	4–2	2–1	2–5	0–0	1–0
Easington Sports	0–3	3–2	4–3	3–1	—	0–3	3–0	4–1	2–0	1–3	0–1	2–1	1–2	1–5	0–2	2–1	1–1	0–2	1–3
Eynesbury Rovers	3–2	0–1	1–2	0–0	2–0	—	0–1	3–3	1–3	1–0	2–1	3–1	2–0	6–3	0–2	5–0	0–1	3–2	5–1
GNG Oadby Town	1–0	0–1	1–5	1–2	3–1	1–2	—	0–2	1–4	0–5	3–2	7–2	0–3	1–5	1–4	0–4	1–3	0–3	1–2
Godmanchester Rovers	0–4	1–5	1–4	1–3	1–1	2–3	1–2	—	2–0	1–5	0–1	1–3	1–4	0–5	1–2	0–2	1–2	0–4	2–3
Hinckley	0–1	4–1	4–1	0–1	1–1	3–1	4–1	2–0	—	4–2	5–1	4–2	3–1	2–1	2–2	3–1	1–4	1–3	4–0
Histon	1–2	2–1	3–1	0–0	2–1	2–2	3–1	1–3	3–3	—	2–1	1–1	0–0	2–0	2–0	2–2	0–2	0–1	4–4
Leicester Nirvana	4–0	3–0	0–1	2–1	1–1	3–2	2–0	4–2	2–0	2–1	—	1–1	1–1	0–0	3–2	3–0	0–1	2–3	2–0
Lutterworth Town	0–2	2–1	2–1	3–1	0–3	0–2	2–1	1–1	0–0	3–0	3–1	—	2–2	1–4	3–2	0–1	0–2	0–2	4–2
March Town United	2–0	1–1	2–1	0–1	4–1	1–0	4–1	0–3	3–1	3–0	1–2	6–0	—	2–1	1–1	2–2	0–1	3–1	3–0
Newport Pagnell Town	0–2	5–3	1–3	1–0	3–1	0–2	0–0	3–2	2–1	3–1	2–0	2–1	1–3	—	4–2	2–1	1–0	0–1	5–1
Northampton ON Chenecks	0–2	3–2	1–1	1–1	1–0	3–3	1–1	5–1	1–4	2–0	3–2	2–0	2–3	4–0	—	1–2	2–2	2–2	1–0
Northampton Sileby Rangers	2–2	0–2	1–1	1–6	4–2	2–3	2–5	4–2	2–2	1–3	4–1	4–1	3–2	2–3	1–1	—	1–4	0–3	2–1
Rugby Borough	0–0	1–1	4–0	0–3	1–2	3–3	2–1	0–0	3–0	0–1	5–1	1–2	1–1	0–1	7–2	1–2	—	1–4	3–0
St Neots Town	3–2	5–1	3–1	1–0	5–0	2–5	7–1	8–2	4–2	3–1	6–0	3–1	1–1	2–1	3–2	2–0	0–3	—	2–0
Yaxley	1–4	4–1	5–4	1–3	3–0	1–2	5–1	3–0	2–2	2–0	2–2	2–1	0–3	0–1	2–3	3–3	1–5	2–4	—

Source: FA Full-Time Grid
Legend: Blue = home team win; Yellow = draw; Red = away team win.
For upcoming matches, an "a" indicates there is an article about the rivalry between the two participants.

=== Stadia and locations ===
Location of the Premier Division South clubs

Club	Location	Stadium	Capacity
Aylestone Park	Leicester	Saffron Lane	1,128
Bugbrooke St Michaels	Bugbrooke	Birds Close	2,500
Coventry United	Coventry	Butts Park Arena (Note: home of Coventry Rugby Club (groundshare))	4,000
Daventry Town	Daventry	Elderstubbs	1,855
Easington Sports	Easington	Addison Road	
Eynesbury Rovers	Eynesbury	Alfred Hall Memorial Ground	
GNG Oadby Town	Leicester	Riverside	3,000
Godmanchester Rovers	Godmanchester	Bearscroft Lane	
Hinckley	Barwell	Kirkby Road	2,500
Histon	Impington	Bridge Road	4,300
Leicester Nirvana	Leicester	Hamilton Park	
Lutterworth Town	Lutterworth	Dunley Way	
March Town United	March	GER Sports Ground	
Newport Pagnell Town	Newport Pagnell	Willen Road	2,000
Northampton ON Chenecks	Northampton	Old Northamptonians Sports Ground	
Northampton Sileby Rangers	Northampton	Fernie Fields	
Rugby Borough	Rugby	Kilsby Lane	
St Neots Town	St Neots	New Rowley Park	3,500
Yaxley	Yaxley	Leading Drove	1,000

== Division One ==
United Counties League Division One
- Season: 2024–25
- Champions: Clay Cross Town
- Promoted: Clay Cross Town; Blackstones
- Relegated: Selston
- Matches: 342
- Goals: 1,229 (3.59 per match)
- Top goalscorer: Reece Clegg (Clay Cross Town) (29 goals)
- Biggest home win: Retford United 11–1 Sandiacre Town (23 November 2024)
- Biggest away win: Staveley Miners Welfare 0–8 Retford (14 December 2024)
- Highest scoring: Retford United 11–1 Sandiacre Town (23 November 2024)

At the end of the 2023–24 season, nine teams left the division:

- Asfordby, relegated to the Leicestershire Senior League
- Birstall United, transferred to the Midland League Division One
- Bourne Town, promoted to the Premier Division North
- Harrowby United, promoted to the Premier Division North
- Kirby Muxloe, transferred to the Midland League Division One
- Leicester St Andrews, transferred to the Midland League Division One
- Lutterworth Athletic, transferred to the Midland League Division One
- Newark Town, promoted to the Premier Division North
- Saffron Dynamo, transferred to the Midland League Division One

Before the 2024–25 season, seven teams joined the division:

- Clay Cross Town, transferred from the Northern Counties East League
- Coalville Town, resigned from the Southern League Premier Division Central
- Pinxton, promoted from the Central Midlands Alliance League
- Retford, transferred from the Northern Counties East League
- Retford United, transferred from the Northern Counties East League
- Stapleford Town, promoted from the Nottinghamshire Senior League
- Staveley Miners Welfare, transferred from the Northern Counties East League

=== League table ===
Pos	Team	Pld	W	D	L	GF	GA	GD	Pts	Promotion, qualification or relegation
1	Clay Cross Town (C, P)	36	28	3	5	105	35	+70	87	Promotion to the Premier Division North
2	Retford	36	27	4	5	111	45	+66	85	Qualification for the play-offs
3	Retford United	36	22	5	9	103	37	+66	71	Qualification for the play-offs
4	Blackstones (O, P)	36	21	5	10	77	39	+38	68	Qualification for the play-offs
5	Clipstone	36	21	2	13	66	52	+14	65	Qualification for the play-offs
6	Staveley Miners Welfare	36	19	6	11	69	49	+20	63	
7	Gedling Miners Welfare	36	19	4	13	64	48	+16	61	
8	Pinxton	36	17	7	12	55	51	+4	58	
9	Radford	36	18	3	15	83	61	+22	57	
10	Coalville Town	36	17	2	17	56	58	−2	53	
11	Stapleford Town	36	14	9	13	53	51	+2	51	
12	Southwell City	36	14	7	15	58	60	−2	49	
13	Dunkirk	36	11	6	19	71	84	−13	39	
14	West Bridgford	36	10	5	21	41	73	−32	35	
15	Rainworth Miners Welfare	36	9	5	22	51	105	−54	32	
16	Clifton All Whites	36	9	4	23	45	103	−58	31	
17	Sandiacre Town	36	8	4	24	44	102	−58	28	Reprieved from relegation
18	Holwell Sports	36	7	4	25	40	93	−53	25	Reprieved from relegation
19	Selston (R)	36	5	7	24	37	83	−46	22	Relegation to the Central Midlands Alliance League

Source: The FA Full-Time
Rules for classification: 1) points; 2) goal difference; 3) number of goals scored; 4) number of matches won; 5) head-to-head results
(C) Champions; (O) Play-off winners; (P) Promoted; (R) Relegated

=== Play-offs ===
Semi-finals
2	Retford	4
5	Clipstone	0
3	Retford United	0
4	Blackstones	3

Final
2	Retford	2
4	Blackstones	3

==== Semifinals ====
26 April	Retford	4–0	Clipstone	Retford
15:00	Bennett 32', 49', 79'; Degirolamo 84'	Report		Stadium: The Rail; Attendance: 388; Referee: James Green

26 April	Retford United	0–3	Blackstones	Retford
15:00		Report	Duffy-Weekes 17'; Bestwick 35'; Thorpe 50'	Stadium: Cannon Park; Attendance: 302; Referee: Ryan Calvert

==== Final ====
3 May	Retford	2–3	Blackstones	Retford
15:00 GMT	Sennett-Neilson 8'; Finney 84'	Report	Bestwick 43' (pen.), 73'; 62' (o.g.)	Stadium: The Rail; Attendance: 975; Referee: Andrew Park

=== Results table ===
Home \ Away	BLA	CCT	CAW	CLP	COA	DUN	GMW	HWS	PIN	RAD	RMW	RTF	RFU	SAN	SEL	SOU	STP	SMW	WES
Blackstones	—	3–2	1–1	2–0	2–0	1–2	0–1	3–1	4–0	4–1	6–1	2–1	1–2	2–0	3–3	1–0	2–2	0–2	2–1
Clay Cross Town	1–0	—	5–1	6–1	4–1	7–0	5–2	6–1	1–1	6–1	2–0	3–3	0–4	2–0	3–0	3–2	1–2	4–0	3–0
Clifton All Whites	1–5	2–3	—	1–4	1–0	3–3	3–6	3–1	0–1	0–7	5–2	0–6	0–5	6–3	3–1	1–4	0–3	0–0	1–0
Clipstone	4–3	0–1	2–0	—	1–3	1–2	1–4	3–0	0–3	1–0	2–0	2–4	1–2	1–0	6–1	2–3	1–0	2–1	2–1
Coalville Town	2–1	1–4	4–0	2–3	—	3–2	1–2	3–0	1–0	2–0	4–1	1–5	1–6	2–0	2–1	0–1	3–0	2–0	1–0
Dunkirk	1–6	0–1	3–0	2–2	1–2	—	2–2	1–1	1–2	4–5	5–1	1–3	3–4	6–2	3–2	1–1	1–0	1–3	0–1
Gedling Miners Welfare	0–1	0–1	1–0	1–2	1–1	0–2	—	2–0	0–0	3–1	2–3	2–4	0–2	4–0	3–1	2–1	2–1	1–3	3–0
Holwell Sports	1–1	0–2	3–2	0–2	0–3	0–4	0–2	—	1–3	0–4	2–0	2–4	1–3	2–3	0–3	2–4	0–2	0–4	4–1
Pinxton	0–4	1–1	2–0	0–1	2–0	1–1	0–4	1–1	—	3–0	3–1	2–3	1–0	3–1	2–0	2–2	3–1	2–2	3–0
Radford	1–1	0–1	7–1	0–1	2–0	1–4	0–1	2–3	3–2	—	7–0	1–3	1–1	3–1	4–0	1–2	1–0	1–3	3–2
Rainworth Miners Welfare	1–2	0–4	1–0	1–3	0–5	3–2	1–3	4–4	1–2	0–4	—	3–1	1–3	2–2	1–2	2–1	1–2	0–4	6–3
Retford	3–2	2–1	5–0	2–1	5–0	6–2	2–0	5–2	2–0	0–2	0–1	—	2–0	3–0	2–0	3–3	3–0	2–1	4–2
Retford United	1–0	1–2	7–1	0–1	0–1	5–0	1–1	6–1	0–1	5–0	7–1	1–2	—	11–1	1–0	4–0	2–2	1–1	2–1
Sandiacre Town	0–2	1–7	2–1	0–7	2–1	3–1	1–3	1–2	3–1	2–3	2–4	2–2	1–5	—	1–1	2–3	0–0	0–3	1–2
Selston	0–2	1–5	0–1	1–2	0–0	1–4	3–2	0–2	1–4	1–6	2–3	1–0	2–4	2–1	—	1–3	1–2	1–1	0–1
Southwell City	2–1	0–1	1–2	4–2	3–2	1–0	0–2	1–0	0–1	1–4	3–3	2–4	2–1	0–1	1–1	—	2–0	1–2	2–3
Stapleford Town	0–2	3–1	2–2	0–1	3–2	5–3	0–2	2–0	2–0	0–3	1–1	2–2	2–1	5–1	1–1	1–1	—	3–2	1–1
Staveley Miners Welfare	0–2	1–3	1–2	1–1	4–0	2–1	3–0	2–1	4–0	2–2	5–1	0–8	1–4	0–2	3–1	1–0	1–0	—	3–0
West Bridgford	1–3	0–3	2–1	1–0	1–0	3–2	2–0	1–2	5–3	1–2	0–0	1–5	1–1	0–2	1–1	1–1	1–3	0–3	—

Source: FA Full-Time Grid
Legend: Blue = home team win; Yellow = draw; Red = away team win.
For upcoming matches, an "a" indicates there is an article about the rivalry between the two participants.

=== Stadia and locations ===
Location of the clubs in the 2024–25 United Counties League Division One
Location of the clubs in the 2024–25 United Counties League Division One (Nottinghamshire)

Club	Location	Stadium	Capacity
Blackstones	Stamford	Lincoln Road	1,000
Clay Cross Town	Clay Cross	Mill Lane	
Clifton All Whites	Nottingham (Clifton)	Green Lane	
Clipstone	Clipstone	Lido Ground	
Coalville Town	Coalville	The Mander Cruickshank Stadium	
Dunkirk	Nottingham (Dunkirk)	Lenton Lane	
Gedling Miners Welfare	Gedling	Plains Road	
Holwell Sports	Asfordby Hill	Welby Road	1,000
Pinxton	Pinxton	The Welfare Ground	
Radford	Nottingham (Radford)	Selhurst Street	
Rainworth Miners Welfare	Rainworth	Welfare Ground	
Retford	Retford	The Rail	1,000
Retford United	Retford	Cannon Park	2,000
Sandiacre Town	Sandiacre	St Giles Park	
Selston	Selston	Mansfield Road	
Southwell City	Southwell	Centenary Ground, Brinkley	
Stapleford Town	Nottingham (Radford)	Selhurst Street	
Staveley Miners Welfare	Staveley	Inkersall Road	5,000
West Bridgford	West Bridgford	Regatta Way	

== League Cup ==
2024–25 United Counties League Cup
Tournament details
- Country: England
- Teams: 59

Final positions
- Champions: Eynesbury Rovers (1st title)
- Runners-up: Lincoln United

Quarter-finals

22 February 2025	Skegness Town (PN)	1–2	Newark Town (PN)	Skegness
15:00	Dilley 36'	Report	Czerwak 62', 67'	Stadium: MKM Stadium; Attendance: 117; Referee: Craig Forbes

22 February 2025	Rugby Borough (PS)	1–1 (a.e.t.) (5–3 p)	Bourne Town (PN)	Rugby
15:00	Dube	Report	Marshall 90+4'	Stadium: Kilsby Lane; Referee: William Norriss

22 February 2025	Hinckley (PS)	3–4	Lincoln United (PN)	Barwell
15:00	Bradshaw 15'; Donzo 73'; Kohyrelon 90+3'	Report	Drummond 31'; Matthews 33'; McMenemy 70'	Stadium: Kirkby Road; Attendance: 183; Referee: Thomas Taylor

22 February 2025	Eynesbury Rovers (PS)	1–1 (a.e.t.) (5–4 p)	Clay Cross Town (D1)	Eynesbury
15:00	Mullings 45'	Report	Poplar 90+3'	Stadium: Alfred Hall Memorial Field; Attendance: 177; Referee: Wyndham Trusler

Semi-finals

22 March 2025	Eynesbury Rovers (PS)	1–0	Rugby Borough (PS)	Eynesbury
15:00	Hammer 81'; Osobu (red card) 90+1'	Report		Stadium: Alfred Hall Memorial Field; Attendance: 220; Referee: Sam Anderson

25 March 2025	Lincoln United (PN)	1–0	Newark Town (PN)	Lincoln
19:45	Dye 57'	Report		Stadium: Ashby Avenue; Attendance: 233; Referee: Lewis Saunders-Johnson

Final

5 May 2025	Lincoln United (PN)	0–2	Eynesbury Rovers (PS)	Market Deeping
15:00		Report	Hammer 10'; Kimpton 29'	Stadium: Haydon Whitham Stadium; Attendance: 304; Referee: Jack DeSchoolmeester
