= 2023–24 FA Cup qualifying rounds =

Tournament details
- Country: England; Wales
- Teams: 640

The 2023–24 FA Cup qualifying rounds opened the 143rd edition of the FA Cup, the world's oldest association football single knockout competition, organised by The Football Association, the governing body for the sport in England. 640 teams in the 5th to 10th tier of English football competed across six rounds for 32 spots in the first round proper.

== Eligibility ==
Places for the FA Cup were capped at 732 to match the number of clubs in the top 9 tiers of English football, meaning 640 places were available in the qualifying competition. Clubs from the 10th tier were accepted only where there was a shortage of teams due to higher ranked teams not applying or being ineligible for entry. This left seven places, which were awarded to the applicants from the 10th tier that had finished 2022–23 with the highest points per game, but that had not been promoted.

== Calendar ==
Round	Main date	Leagues entering this round	New entries this round	Winners from the previous round	Number of fixtures	Prize fund	
Round	Main date	Leagues entering this round	New entries this round	Winners from the previous round	Number of fixtures	Losing club	Winning club
Extra preliminary round	5 August 2023	Level 8 (95 lowest ranked clubs); Level 9 Level 10 (highest ranked clubs)	416	None	208	£375	£1,125
Preliminary round	19 August 2023	Level 8	64	208	136	£481	£1,444
First qualifying round	2 September 2023	Level 7	88	136	112	£750	£2,250
Second qualifying round	16 September 2023	National League North; National League South	48	112	80	£1,125	£3,375
Third qualifying round	30 September 2023	None	0	80	40	£1,875	£5,625
Fourth qualifying round	14 October 2023	National League	24	40	32	£3,125	£9,375

== Extra preliminary round ==
The draw for the extra preliminary round was made on 7 July 2023. The seven clubs allowed entry from the 10th tier (Stockport Town, Hartpury University, Brislington, Wells City, Wendron United, Liskeard Athletic and Okehampton Argyle) were the lowest ranked teams to enter.

Tie	(Note: (10) represents teams allocated to divisions at the 10th tier of English football (otherwise known as Step 6 of the National League System). (9) represents the 9th tier (Step 5 NLS). (8) represents the 8th tier (Step 4 NLS).)(Tier) Home team	Score	Away team (Tier)	Att.
Friday 4 August 2023
13	Whickham (9)	2–1	Carlisle City (9)	298
27	Skelmersdale United (9)	3–1	Northwich Victoria (9)	239
53	Coventry United (9)	2–3	Studley (9)	212
81	Thetford Town (9)	1–2	Newmarket Town (9)	388
87	Dereham Town (9)	4–1	Walsham-le-Willows (9)	206
94	Stansted (9)	2–1	Stotfold (8)	213
96	Woodford Town (9)	4–1	Hertford Town (8)	242
101	Edgware & Kingsbury (9)	1–1	Waltham Abbey (8)	188
125	Bishop's Cleeve (8)	3–3	Thornbury Town (9)	252
183	Moneyfields (9)	1–0	Westbury United (8)	177
Saturday 5 August 2023
1	Sunderland RCA (9)	1–5	West Allotment Celtic (9)	89
2	Knaresborough Town (9)	3–1	Frickley Athletic (9)	268
3	Heaton Stannington (9)	5–0	Tow Law Town (9)	285
4	Ashington (8)	4–0	North Shields (9)	447
5	West Auckland Town (9)	2–0	Northallerton Town (9)	133
7	Seaham Red Star (9)	1–0	Pickering Town (9)	118
8	Whitley Bay (9)	2–1	Garforth Town (9)	277
9	Bishop Auckland (9)	3–0	Bridlington Town (8)	404
11	North Ferriby (8)	2–1	Crook Town (9)	406
12	Kendal Town (9)	1–4	Consett (8)	310
14	Tadcaster Albion (9)	1–0	Redcar Athletic (9)	210
15	Newcastle Benfield (9)	0–3	Shildon (9)	177
16	Penrith (9)	2–1	Boro Rangers (9)	65
Match played at Carlisle City.
17	Golcar United (9)	0–0	Trafford (8)	422
18	Thackley (9)	2–3	Goole (9)	210
20	Stockport Town (10)	0–1	Ramsbottom United (9)	159
21	AFC Liverpool (9)	0–5	Lower Breck (9)	213
23	Burscough (9)	1–0	Pilkington (9)	172
24	Ossett United (8)	2–0	1874 Northwich (8)	392
25	Congleton Town (9)	1–0	Wythenshawe Town (9)	377
26	Barnoldswick Town (9)	3–1	Handsworth (9)	189
28	Padiham (9)	3–0	Silsden (9)	204
29	Prescot Cables (8)	2–0	Eccleshill United (9)	506
30	City of Liverpool (8)	2–2	Penistone Church (9)	224
31	Glossop North End (9)	1–2	Colne (9)	294
32	West Didsbury & Chorlton (9)	2–0	Vauxhall Motors (8)	537
33	Widnes (8)	1–1	Longridge Town (9)	163
34	Prestwich Heys (9)	3–1	Bootle (8)	254
35	Whitchurch Alport (9)	2–1	Cheadle Town (9)	141
37	Uttoxeter Town (9)	1–4	Bury (9)	2,903
Match played at Bury.
39	Charnock Richard (9)	7–0	Squires Gate (9)	148
40	Highgate United (9)	2–2	Walsall Wood (8)	83
41	Bewdley Town (9)	7–3	Daventry Town (9)	114
42	Rugby Town (8)	5–5	Malvern Town (8)	301
43	Atherstone Town (9)	3–0	Stone Old Alleynians (9)	234
44	Bugbrooke St Michaels (9)	2–3	Hinckley LR (8)	96
45	Hereford Pegasus (9)	1–1	Hanley Town (8)	91
46	AFC Wulfrunians (9)	0–2	Gresley Rovers (8)	181
47	Westfields (9)	2–2	Cogenhoe United (9)	108
48	Romulus (9)	2–2	Newcastle Town (8)	59
49	Boldmere St. Michaels (8)	3–2	Lichfield City (9)	160
50	Kidsgrove Athletic (8)	0–0	Lye Town (8)	122
51	Worcester Raiders (9)	3–2	Belper United (9)	205
52	Bedworth United (8)	3–6	Heanor Town (9)	182
54	Sutton Coldfield Town (8)	3–1	Wolverhampton Casuals (9)	125
55	Darlaston Town (1874) (9)	3–1	Racing Club Warwick (9)	123
56	Stourport Swifts (9)	2–0	Coventry Sphinx (8)	134
57	Shifnal Town (9)	3–1	Hereford Lads Club (9)	196
58	Worcester City (9)	3–0	Dudley Town (9)	462
59	Tividale (9)	1–4	Rugby Borough (9)	88
60	Quorn (8)	1–1	Carlton Town (8)	204
63	Skegness Town (9)	0–0	AFC Mansfield (9)	101
65	Grantham Town (8)	1–1	Loughborough Students (9)	249
66	Lutterworth Town (9)	0–3	Lincoln United (9)	60
67	Eastwood Community (9)	3–1	Kimberley Miners Welfare (9)	210
68	GNG Oadby Town (9)	1–3	Bottesford Town (9)	51
69	Sherwood Colliery (9)	2–2	Aylestone Park (9)	111
70	Cleethorpes Town (8)	1–1	Loughborough Dynamo (8)	169
71	Rossington Main (9)	4–1	Leicester Nirvana (9)	154
72	Boston Town (9)	0–0	Anstey Nomads (8)	115
73	Maltby Main (9)	1–1	Pinchbeck United (9)	103
74	Winterton Rangers (8)	2–4	Melton Town (9)	213
75	Ashby Ivanhoe (9)	3–0	Deeping Rangers (9)	164
76	Harleston Town (9)	2–3	Kempston Rovers (8)	278
77	Ely City (9)	0–0	Eynesbury Rovers (9)	148
78	Norwich United (9)	0–2	Woodbridge Town (9)	
79	Bury Town (8)	3–1	Biggleswade United (9)	424
80	Kirkley & Pakefield (9)	1–0	Downham Town (9)	
82	Yaxley (9)	0–7	Wroxham (8)	105
83	Mulbarton Wanderers (9)	2–1	Sheringham (9)	92
84	Gorleston (8)	4–1	Heacham (9)	123
85	Wellingborough Town (9)	6–0	Long Melford (9)	90
86	Mildenhall Town (9)	2–0	Soham Town Rangers (9)	277
88	Desborough Town (9)	2–2	Potton United (9)	116
89	Wisbech Town (9)	3–1	March Town United (9)	421
90	Lakenheath (9)	2–2	Godmanchester Rovers (9)	65
91	St Neots Town (9)	2–2	Fakenham Town (9)	211
95	West Essex (9)	3–2	Crawley Green (9)	93
97	Redbridge (8)	2–2	New Salamis (8)	75
98	St. Panteleimon (9)	2–2	Witham Town (8)	31
99	Cockfosters (9)	0–1	Barking (9)	170
100	Saffron Walden Town (9)	1–0	Great Wakering Rovers (9)	261
102	AFC Dunstable (8)	2–1	Newport Pagnell Town (9)	158
103	Sawbridgeworth Town (9)	5–1	Arlesey Town (9)	78
106	Colney Heath (9)	1–1	Ilford (9)	110
108	Halstead Town (9)	1–4	Romford (9)	255
109	Leverstock Green (9)	5–3	White Ensign (9)	79
110	FC Romania (9)	5–0	Tilbury (9)	106
111	East Thurrock United (8)	1–0	Frenford (9)	148
112	Shefford Town & Campton (9)	0–2	Maldon & Tiptree (8)	156
113	London Lions (9)	3–5	Barton Rovers (8)	87
114	Leighton Town (8)	3–0	Basildon United (8)	367
115	Buckhurst Hill (9)	1–1	Brantham Athletic (9)	88
117	Hullbridge Sports (9)	4–1	Takeley (9)	93
118	Milton Keynes Irish (9)	3–1	Dunstable Town (9)	173
119	Fairford Town (9)	1–1	Aylesbury United (8)	99
120	Chalfont St Peter (9)	1–3	Wallingford & Crowmarsh (9)	130
121	Mangotsfield United (9)	2–0	Royal Wootton Bassett Town (9)	190
122	Ardley United (9)	1–1	Ascot United (8)	96
123	Thame United (8)	2–3	Bristol Manor Farm (8)	96
124	Slimbridge (9)	2–3	Reading City (9)	105
126	Lydney Town (9)	1–1	Roman Glass St George (9)	177
127	Cribbs (8)	3–1	Longlevens (9)	93
128	Tring Athletic (9)	0–2	Nailsea & Tickenham (9)	125
129	Virginia Water (9)	2–0	Risborough Rangers (9)	
131	Tuffley Rovers (9)	2–2	Aylesbury Vale Dynamos (9)	124
132	Hartpury University (10)		Holyport (9)	62
Holyport originally won 1-2, but the tie was voided, and ordered to be replayed due to a refereeing error.
133	Clevedon Town (9)	2–1	Wantage Town (9)	157
135	Easington Sports (9)	3–1	Burnham (9)	
136	Kidlington (8)	0–3	Flackwell Heath (9)	125
138	Sporting Bengal United (9)	4–4	Stansfeld (9)	102
139	Chipstead (8)	1–1	Peacehaven & Telscombe (9)	142
141	Sittingbourne (8)	0–0	Jersey Bulls (9)	214
142	Lordswood (9)	2–1	Egham Town (9)	178
143	Newhaven (9)	3–1	Little Common (9)	178
144	Broadbridge Heath (8)	0–1	Sheerwater (9)	186
145	Tunbridge Wells (9)	2–3	Uxbridge (8)	186
146	Spelthorne Sports (9)	2–1	Loxwood (9)	
147	Holmesdale (9)	1–2	Midhurst & Easebourne (9)	70
148	Pagham (9)	0–4	East Grinstead Town (8)	119
149	Eastbourne Town (9)	1–3	Faversham Town (9)	
150	Wembley (9)	1–1	Bearsted (9)	108
151	Athletic Newham (9)	3–3	Tooting & Mitcham United (9)	
152	Crowborough Athletic (9)	3–0	Shoreham (9)	
153	Horley Town (9)	4–0	Punjab United (9)	

Tie	(Tier) Home team	Score	Away team (Tier)	Att.
155	Sutton Common Rovers (8)	1–1	Burgess Hill Town (8)	84
156	Haywards Heath Town (9)	0–5	Whitstable Town (9)	
157	Lydd Town (9)	1–0	Camberley Town (9)	131
158	Deal Town (9)	2–0	Guildford City (9)	273
159	Epsom & Ewell (9)	2–1	Horsham YMCA (9)	
160	Lancing (8)	5–0	Rusthall (9)	273
161	Abbey Rangers (9)	0–0	Colliers Wood United (9)	
162	Three Bridges (8)	2–2	Crawley Down Gatwick (9)	87
163	Hilltop (9)	2–4	Redhill (9)	
Match played at London Colney.
164	Kennington (9)	1–0	Glebe (9)	
Match played at Glebe.
166	Westfield (8)	0–0	Fisher (9)	181
167	Hassocks (9)	1–1	Erith Town (9)	
168	Merstham (8)	2–1	Raynes Park Vale (8)	175
169	Corinthian (9)	3–4	Bedfont Sports (9)	93
170	Knaphill (9)	3–0	AFC Varndeanians (9)	
171	Phoenix Sports (8)	1–2	Eastbourne United (9)	87
172	Balham (9)	0–4	Steyning Town (9)	
174	Harefield United (9)	0–4	Farnham Town (9)	
175	Saltdean United (9)	2–4	Badshot Lea (8)	124
176	Broadfields United (9)	0–4	Snodland Town (9)	
177	Hollands & Blair (9)	0–3	Ashford United (8)	240
179	Sandhurst Town (9)	1–2	VCD Athletic (9)	
180	Southall (8)	1–0	Chichester City (8)	85
181	Horndean (8)	3–0	Portland United (9)	75
182	Oldland Abbotonians (9)	2–2	Blackfield & Langley (9)	
184	Paulton Rovers (8)	5–1	Thatcham Town (8)	152
185	Welton Rovers (9)	1–7	Fareham Town (9)	
187	Christchurch (9)	0–1	United Services Portsmouth (9)	
Match played at United Services Portsmouth.
188	Lymington Town (9)	0–6	Petersfield Town (9)	
Match played at Petersfield Town.
189	Hamble Club (9)	3–3	Hythe & Dibden (9)	
190	Larkhall Athletic (8)	3–1	Corsham Town (9)	215
191	Laverstock & Ford (9)	3–2	Andover New Street (9)	
192	Cowes Sports (9)	2–4	Melksham Town (8)	270
193	Brislington (10)	0–1	Shaftesbury (9)	
194	Baffins Milton Rovers (9)	3–4	AFC Stoneham (9)	
195	Bemerton Heath Harlequins (8)	3–0	Bournemouth (9)	101
196	Brockenhurst (9)	6–4	Fleet Town (9)	264
197	Shepton Mallet (9)	2–2	Sherborne Town (9)	205
198	Wells City (10)	1–2	AFC Portchester (9)	
199	Barnstaple Town (9)	3–1	Saltash United (9)	
200	Buckland Athletic (9)	5–1	Torpoint Athletic (9)	208
201	Falmouth Town (9)	2–1	Exmouth Town (8)	
202	Wendron United (10)	1–3	St Blazey (9)	
203	Bridgwater United (9)	4–2	Liskeard Athletic (10)	412
204	Okehampton Argyle (10)	2–2	Brixham (9)	483
205	Mousehole (8)	4–1	Ilfracombe Town (9)	226
206	Helston Athletic (9)	3–1	Willand Rovers (8)	85
207	Street (9)	9–1	Millbrook (Cornwall) (9)	
208	Wellington (9)	0–2	Bideford (8)	109
Match played at Willand Rovers.
Sunday 6 August 2023
19	Albion Sports (9)	2–2	Chadderton (9)	94
22	Hallam (9)	3–3	Irlam (9)	638
36	Emley (9)	H–W	Avro (8)	301
Avro originally won 0-2 but were later disqualified after an administrative error.
116	Enfield (8)	2–0	Coggeshall Town (9)	240
134	Wokingham & Emmbrook (9)	1–0	Cinderford Town (9)	303
137	AFC Croydon Athletic (9)	3–1	Sutton Athletic (9)	542
140	Bexhill United (9)	3–1	North Greenford United (9)	105
Match played at Hailsham Town.
154	Littlehampton Town (8)	0–6	Erith & Belvedere (8)	210
173	Lingfield (9)	1–3	Sevenoaks Town (8)	105
178	Welling Town (9)	0-4	Cobham (9)	104
Tuesday 8 August 2023
10	Pontefract Collieries (8)	3–0	Birtley Town (9)	279
38	Wythenshawe (9)	2–1	Campion (9)	428
61	Newark and Sherwood United (9)	3–2	Hucknall Town (9)	228
62	Sleaford Town (9)	0–2	Shepshed Dynamo (8)	200
64	Barton Town (9)	1–3	Grimsby Borough (8)	293
92	Hadleigh United (9)	2–3	Cambridge City (8)	
93	Ipswich Wanderers (8)	3–0	Histon (9)	90
104	Stanway Rovers (9)	3–1	Harpenden Town (9)	
105	Little Oakley (9)	3–1	Baldock Town (9)	75
107	FC Clacton (9)	2–2	Real Bedford (9)	107
165	Ashford Town (Middlesex) (8)	1–0	AFC Uckfield Town (9)	149
186	Tadley Calleva (9)	5–2	Alton (9)	189
Wednesday 9 August 2023
6	Guisborough Town (9)	2–2	Newton Aycliffe (8)	318
130	Brimscombe & Thrupp (9)	1–4	Highworth Town (9)	171
Replays
Monday 7 August 2023
106R	Ilford (9)	1–2	Colney Heath (9)	
Tuesday 8 August 2023
17R	Trafford (8)	1–0	Golcar United (9)	353
19R	Chadderton (9)	A–W	Albion Sports (9)	
Match not played. Chadderton disqualified after fielding ineligible player in the original 2-2 draw.
22R	Irlam (9)	5–2	Hallam (9)	350
33R	Longridge Town (9)	1–5	Widnes (8)	188
40R	Walsall Wood (8)	2–1	Highgate United (9)	121
42R	Malvern Town (8)	1–2	Rugby Town (8)	468
45R	Hanley Town (8)	2–1	Hereford Pegasus (9)	155
47R	Cogenhoe United (9)	2–2 (4–5 p)	Westfields (9)	92
48R	Newcastle Town (8)	1–0	Romulus (9)	90
50R	Lye Town (8)	1–2	Kidsgrove Athletic (8)	
60R	Carlton Town (8)	2–0	Quorn (8)	204
65R	Loughborough Students (9)	0–1	Grantham Town (8)	230
69R	Aylestone Park (9)	1–2	Sherwood Colliery (9)	147
70R	Loughborough Dynamo (8)	0–2	Cleethorpes Town (8)	154
72R	Anstey Nomads (8)	2–2 (5–3 p)	Boston Town (9)	148
77R	Eynesbury Rovers (9)	2–3 (a.e.t.)	Ely City (9)	160
88R	Potton United (9)	1–1 (5–4 p)	Desborough Town (9)	140
90R	Godmanchester Rovers (9)	3–5	Lakenheath (9)	99
91R	Fakenham Town (9)	2–1 (a.e.t.)	St Neots Town (9)	183
98R	Witham Town (8)	1–0	St. Panteleimon (9)	122
101R	Waltham Abbey (8)	2–1	Edgware & Kingsbury (9)	220
115R	Brantham Athletic (9)	1–2 (a.e.t.)	Buckhurst Hill (9)	58
122R	Ascot United (8)	2–1	Ardley United (9)	176
125R	Thornbury Town (9)	0–1	Bishop's Cleeve (8)	225
Match played at Tytherington Rocks.
138R	Stansfeld (9)	1–1 (6–5 p)	Sporting Bengal United (9)	78
139R	Peacehaven & Telscombe (9)	4–1	Chipstead (8)	176
141R	Jersey Bulls (9)	2–0	Sittingbourne (8)	153
Match played at Sittingbourne
150R	Bearsted (9)	3–1	Wembley (9)	176
151R	Tooting & Mitcham United (9)	2–4	Athletic Newham (9)	135
155R	Burgess Hill Town (8)	2–1	Sutton Common Rovers (8)	264
162R	Crawley Down Gatwick (9)	2–0	Three Bridges (8)	121
166R	Fisher (9)	2–5	Westfield (8)	151
167R	Erith Town (9)	4–0	Hassocks (9)	111
182R	Blackfield & Langley (9)	3–2 (a.e.t.)	Oldland Abbotonians (9)	115
189R	Hythe & Dibden (9)	1–5	Hamble Club (9)	112
204R	Brixham (9)	0–2 (a.e.t.)	Okehampton Argyle (10)	204
Wednesday 9 August 2023
30R	Penistone Church (9)	3–1	City of Liverpool (8)	424
63R	AFC Mansfield (9)	1–2	Skegness Town (9)	102
73R	Pinchbeck United (9)	1–3	Maltby Main (9)	119
97R	New Salamis (8)	3–1	Redbridge (8)	136
119R	Aylesbury United (8)	2–1	Fairford Town (9)	156
126R	Roman Glass St George (9)	5–2	Lydney Town (9)	85
161R	Colliers Wood United (9)	2–0	Abbey Rangers (9)	161
197R	Sherborne Town (9)	1–0	Shepton Mallet (9)	205
Tuesday 15 August 2023
6R	Newton Aycliffe (8)	2–3	Guisborough Town (9)	195
107R	Real Bedford (9)	4–1	FC Clacton (9)	284
131R	Aylesbury Vale Dynamos (9)	A–W	Tuffley Rovers (9)	
Match not played. Aylesbury Vale Dynamos disqualified after fielding ineligible player in the original 2-2 draw.
132R	Hartpury University (10)	1–2	Holyport (9)	64
Match played at Holyport.

== Preliminary round ==
The draw for the preliminary round was made on 7 July 2023, following the draw for the extra preliminary round. Okehampton Argyle were the sole team from Level 10 to progress to this stage.

Number of non-league teams per tier still in qualifying
National League (Note: National League teams joined in the fourth round of qualifying)	North/South (Note: National League North/South teams joined in the second round of qualifying.)	Premier Division (Note: Premier Division teams joined in the first round of qualifying.)	Division One	Regional	Step 6	Total
24 / 24	48 / 48	88 / 88	114 / 114	269 / 269	1 / 1	447 / 447

Tie	(Note: (10) represents teams allocated to divisions at the 10th tier of English football (otherwise known as Step 6 of the National League System). (9) represents the 9th tier (Step 5 NLS). (8) represents the 8th tier (Step 4 NLS).)(Tier) Home team	Score	Away team (Tier)	Att.
Friday 18 August 2023
2	Whickham (9)	1–1	Whitley Bay (9)	
5	Hebburn Town (8)	0–2	Heaton Stannington (9)	
16	Skelmersdale United (9)	0–6	Nantwich Town (8)	
27	Studley (9)	0–1	Coleshill Town (8)	
57	Ipswich Wanderers (8)	0–0	Dereham Town (9)	162
82	Aylesbury United (8)	0–2	Clevedon Town (9)	166
87	Wokingham & Emmbrook (9)	0–2	Binfield (8)	604
109	Epsom & Ewell (9)	0–0	Metropolitan Police (8)	
136	Bridgwater United (9)	4–0	Street (9)	
Saturday 19 August 2023
1	Pontefract Collieries (8)	1–3	Guisborough Town (9)	242
3	West Allotment Celtic (9)	0–2	Tadcaster Albion (9)	100
4	Bishop Auckland (9)	7–0	Seaham Red Star (9)	
6	Penrith (9)	0–3	Consett (8)	232
Match played at Consett.
7	West Auckland Town (9)	4–0	Shildon (9)	331
8	Knaresborough Town (9)	1–3	Dunston (8)	258
9	Stockton Town (8)	2–1	Ashington (8)	332
10	Liversedge (8)	0–1	North Ferriby (8)	256
11	Irlam (9)	3–3	Goole (9)	264
12	Runcorn Linnets (8)	3–2	Stalybridge Celtic (8)	634
13	Penistone Church (9)	0–2	Prestwich Heys (9)	254
14	Congleton Town (9)	1–2	Witton Albion (8)	492
15	Ossett United (8)	2–0	Wythenshawe (9)	327
17	Padiham (9)	2–5	Clitheroe (8)	460
18	Mossley (8)	1–0	Ramsbottom United (9)	354
19	Whitchurch Alport (9)	1–1	Barnoldswick Town (9)	156
20	West Didsbury & Chorlton (9)	0–3	Prescot Cables (8)	774
21	Widnes (8)	2–1	Trafford (8)	197
22	Charnock Richard (9)	3–2	Bury (9)	979
23	Burscough (9)	0–1	Albion Sports (9)	124
24	Colne (9)	1–3	Brighouse Town (8)	269
26	Sporting Khalsa (8)	6–1	Heanor Town (9)	165
28	Kidsgrove Athletic (8)	2–0	Sutton Coldfield Town (8)	
29	Walsall Wood (8)	0–1	Rugby Borough (9)	
30	Boldmere St. Michaels (8)	1–0	Chasetown (8)	241
31	Hinckley LR (8)	2–1	Bewdley Town (9)	
32	Westfields (9)	1–2	Worcester City (9)	
33	Atherstone Town (9)	2–0	Gresley Rovers (8)	416
34	Shifnal Town (9)	4–1	Worcester Raiders (9)	
35	Belper Town (8)	2–5	Leek Town (8)	456
36	Darlaston Town (1874) (9)	3–0	Hednesford Town (8)	
37	Rugby Town (8)	5–1	Newcastle Town (8)	274
38	Hanley Town (8)	2–2	Stourport Swifts (9)	111
39	Sherwood Colliery (9)	3–1	Grantham Town (8)	211
40	Anstey Nomads (8)	2–1	Eastwood Community (9)	195
41	Carlton Town (8)	3–0	Maltby Main (9)	174
42	Bottesford Town (9)	0–4	Lincoln United (9)	
43	Spalding United (8)	1–1	Shepshed Dynamo (8)	360
44	Ashby Ivanhoe (9)	1–0	Rossington Main (9)	
45	Grimsby Borough (8)	4–2	Melton Town (9)	120
46	Newark and Sherwood United (9)	0–4	Harborough Town (8)	158
47	Sheffield (8)	2–1	Skegness Town (9)	237
48	Stocksbridge Park Steels (8)	0–1	Cleethorpes Town (8)	173
49	Stowmarket Town (8)	2–1	Potton United (9)	269
50	Wisbech Town (9)	1–5	Biggleswade Town (8)	223
51	Mildenhall Town (9)	1–0	Lakenheath (9)	
52	Kempston Rovers (8)	1–3	Biggleswade (8)	127
53	Wellingborough Town (9)	1–4	Felixstowe & Walton United (8)	135
54	Kirkley & Pakefield (9)	2–1	Ely City (9)	105
55	Mulbarton Wanderers (9)	1–5	Bedford Town (8)	
56	Bury Town (8)	1–2	Wroxham (8)	488
58	Corby Town (8)	0–4	Lowestoft Town (8)	533
59	Fakenham Town (9)	1–0	AFC Rushden & Diamonds (8)	298
60	Woodbridge Town (9)	0–1	Gorleston (8)	158
61	Newmarket Town (9)	1–4	Cambridge City (8)	328
62	Maldon & Tiptree (8)	0–0	West Essex (9)	154
63	Witham Town (8)	3–0	Stanway Rovers (9)	153
64	Buckhurst Hill (9)	0–1	Northwood (8)	
65	Brightlingsea Regent (8)	5–0	Stansted (9)	216
66	Walthamstow (8)	3–1	Leverstock Green (9)	415
67	Hullbridge Sports (9)	3–1	Waltham Abbey (8)	85
68	Real Bedford (9)	3–4	Milton Keynes Irish (9)	
69	Leighton Town (8)	1–0	Enfield (8)	
70	East Thurrock United (8)	1–1	Barton Rovers (8)	156
71	Brentwood Town (8)	2–1	Kings Langley (8)	280
72	Ware (8)	2–1	AFC Dunstable (8)	188
73	Romford (9)	1–3	Welwyn Garden City (8)	
74	Bowers & Pitsea (8)	2–2	Woodford Town (9)	150
75	Sawbridgeworth Town (9)	2–1	Saffron Walden Town (9)	
76	Hadley (8)	6–2	Little Oakley (9)	155
77	Colney Heath (9)	2–5	FC Romania (9)	
78	Grays Athletic (8)	1–1	New Salamis (8)	130
79	Heybridge Swifts (8)	2–0	Barking (9)	214
80	Flackwell Heath (9)	2–0	Cirencester Town (8)	285

Tie	(Tier) Home team	Score	Away team (Tier)	Att.
81	Holyport (9)	0–1	Yate Town (8)	95
83	Evesham United (8)	2–0	Tuffley Rovers (9)	247
85	Easington Sports (9)	2–2	Reading City (9)	
86	North Leigh (8)	1–2	Bishop's Cleeve (8)	103
88	Wallingford & Crowmarsh (9)	0–1	Marlow (8)	237
89	Nailsea & Tickenham (9)	0–3	Highworth Town (9)	
90	Ascot United (8)	5–1	Mangotsfield United (9)	137
91	Bristol Manor Farm (8)	4–1	Roman Glass St George (9)	201
92	Jersey Bulls (9)	1–1	Knaphill (9)	
93	Faversham Town (9)	2–1	Merstham (8)	340
94	Snodland Town (9)	1–3	Chertsey Town (8)	474
95	Farnham Town (9)	2–0	Crowborough Athletic (9)	
96	Ramsgate (8)	4–1	Bexhill United (9)	421
97	Bedfont Sports (9)	1–1	Herne Bay (8)	
98	Bearsted (9)	1–2	Southall (8)	136
100	Newhaven (9)	7–1	Spelthorne Sports (9)	
101	Sheppey United (8)	3–0	Midhurst & Easebourne (9)	265
102	VCD Athletic (9)	0–2	Whitstable Town (9)	
103	Sevenoaks Town (8)	3–0	Colliers Wood United (9)	136
104	Erith & Belvedere (8)	2–0	Stansfeld (9)	207
105	Eastbourne United (9)	3–0	Sheerwater (9)	
106	Corinthian-Casuals (8)	2–2	Uxbridge (8)	224
107	Burgess Hill Town (8)	0–0	Erith Town (9)	287
108	South Park (8)	1–1	Leatherhead (8)	279
110	Horley Town (9)	0–1	AFC Croydon Athletic (9)	
111	Steyning Town (9)	3–0	Peacehaven & Telscombe (9)	
112	Cobham (9)	0–4	Kennington (9)	
113	Badshot Lea (8)	2–3	Lancing (8)	
114	Ashford United (8)	2–3	Beckenham Town (8)	142
115	East Grinstead Town (8)	1–3	Hythe Town (8)	142
116	Crawley Down Gatwick (9)	3–6	Hanworth Villa (8)	109
117	Redhill (9)	1–0	Ashford Town (Middlesex) (8)	
118	Lordswood (9)	1–1	Cray Valley Paper Mills (8)	117
119	Athletic Newham (9)	0–3	Westfield (8)	45
120	Hartley Wintney (8)	3–1	Sherborne Town (9)	160
121	Horndean (8)	3–0	Brockenhurst (9)	110
122	AFC Stoneham (9)	5–1	Melksham Town (8)	138
123	Wimborne Town (8)	0–0	Paulton Rovers (8)	350
124	Shaftesbury (9)	5–2	Hamble Club (9)	
125	Petersfield Town (9)	1–1	Bemerton Heath Harlequins (8)	254
126	Fareham Town (9)	2–3	Bashley (8)	258
127	Hamworthy United (8)	1–2	Moneyfields (9)	66
128	Blackfield & Langley (9)	0–5	Laverstock & Ford (9)	
129	Tadley Calleva (9)	H–W	AFC Portchester (9)	
AFC Portchester originally won 1-8 but were later disqualified after fielding ineligible player.
130	United Services Portsmouth (9)	0–2	Larkhall Athletic (8)	55
131	Buckland Athletic (9)	1–1	Okehampton Argyle (10)	307
132	Falmouth Town (9)	2–6	Frome Town (8)	338
133	Tavistock (8)	3–5	Barnstaple Town (9)	170
134	Bideford (8)	4–0	Helston Athletic (9)	223
135	St Blazey (9)	1–5	Mousehole (8)	
Sunday 20 August 2023
84	Virginia Water (9)	1–5	Cribbs (8)	
Wednesday 23 August 2023
25	Lower Breck (9)	1–5	Emley (9)	336
Monday 28 August 2023
99	Lydd Town (9)	4–2	Deal Town (9)	
Replays
Monday 21 August 2023
85R	Reading City (9)	4–0	Easington Sports (9)	189
Tuesday 22 August 2023
2R	Whitley Bay (9)	0–3	Whickham (9)	
11R	Goole (9)	1–0	Irlam (9)	382
19R	Barnoldswick Town (9)	5–0	Whitchurch Alport (9)	210
38R	Stourport Swifts (9)	1–2	Hanley Town (8)	163
43R	Shepshed Dynamo (8)	2–3	Spalding United (8)	
57R	Dereham Town (9)	2–1	Ipswich Wanderers (8)	
62R	West Essex (9)	0–3	Maldon & Tiptree (8)	227
92R	Knaphill (9)	1–0	Jersey Bulls (9)	
97R	Herne Bay (8)	3–0	Bedfont Sports (9)	
107R	Erith Town (9)	1–2	Burgess Hill Town (8)	214
108R	Leatherhead (8)	2–1	South Park (8)	
109R	Metropolitan Police (8)	0–2	Epsom & Ewell (9)	215
118R	Cray Valley Paper Mills (8)	4–1	Lordswood (9)	163
123R	Paulton Rovers (8)	0–2	Wimborne Town (8)	
125R	Bemerton Heath Harlequins (8)	2–3	Petersfield Town (9)	148
131R	Okehampton Argyle (10)	2–1	Buckland Athletic (9)	
Wednesday 23 August 2023
70R	Barton Rovers (8)	3–2	East Thurrock United (8)	119
74R	Woodford Town (9)	4–3	Bowers & Pitsea (8)	429
78R	New Salamis (8)	3–1	Grays Athletic (8)	
106R	Uxbridge (8)	5–1	Corinthian-Casuals (8)	154

== First qualifying round ==
The draw for the first qualifying round was made on 21 August 2023. Okehampton Argyle of the South West Peninsula League were the sole team from Level 10 to progress to this stage.

Number of non-league teams per tier still in qualifying
National League (Note: National League teams joined in the fourth round of qualifying)	North/South (Note: National League North/South teams joined in the second round of qualifying.)	Premier Division	Division One	Regional	Step 6	Total
24 / 24	48 / 48	88 / 88	67 / 114	68 / 156	1 / 1	224 / 295

Tie	(Note: (10) represents teams allocated to divisions at the 10th tier of English football (otherwise known as Step 6 of the National League System). (9) represents the 9th tier (Step 5 NLS). (8) represents the 8th tier (Step 4 NLS). (7) represents the 7th tier (Step 3 NLS).)(Tier) Home team	Score	Away team (Tier)	Att.
Friday 1 September 2023
10	Goole (9)	0–6	Whitby Town (7)	838
97	Laverstock & Ford (9)	2–7	Gosport Borough (7)	377
Saturday 2 September 2023
1	Bishop Auckland (9)	0–0	West Auckland Town (9)	846
2	Charnock Richard (9)	2–2	Runcorn Linnets (8)	385
3	Ashton United (7)	3–1	Dunston (8)	242
4	Prescot Cables (8)	4–2	North Ferriby (8)	559
5	Clitheroe (8)	1–2	Hyde United (7)	738
6	Guisborough Town (9)	0–4	Atherton Collieries (7)	249
7	Consett (8)	0–2	Bradford (Park Avenue) (7)	347
8	Ossett United (8)	0–3	Marske United (7)	321
9	Warrington Rylands 1906 (7)	1–0	Stockton Town (8)	221
11	Bamber Bridge (7)	0–4	Mossley (8)	335
13	Brighouse Town (8)	2–4	Albion Sports (9)	212
14	Guiseley (7)	0–0	Marine (7)	414
15	Workington (7)	6–0	Prestwich Heys (9)	662
16	FC United of Manchester (7)	1–0	Barnoldswick Town (9)	1,040
17	Tadcaster Albion (9)	2–1	Heaton Stannington (9)	289
18	Widnes (8)	1–1	Emley (9)	235
19	Morpeth Town (7)	3–2	Radcliffe (7)	366
20	Lancaster City (7)	2–1	Witton Albion (8)	344
21	Nantwich Town (8)	1–1	Shifnal Town (9)	320
22	Anstey Nomads (8)	3–0	Hanley Town (8)	195
23	Redditch United (7)	5–0	Boldmere St. Michaels (8)	327
24	Cleethorpes Town (8)	2–1	Hinckley LR (8)	164
25	Lincoln United (9)	2–0	Kidsgrove Athletic (8)	172
26	Sporting Khalsa (8)	2–2	Darlaston Town (1874) (9)	975
27	Stratford Town (7)	1–2	Spalding United (8)	337
28	Rugby Town (8)	0–2	Barwell (7)	286
29	Worksop Town (7)	4–1	Sheffield (8)	428
30	Ashby Ivanhoe (9)	0–2	Bromsgrove Sporting (7)	391
31	Sherwood Colliery (9)	1–2	Worcester City (9)	
32	Stafford Rangers (7)	2–0	Atherstone Town (9)	649
33	Leamington (7)	2–0	Coleshill Town (8)	398
34	Alvechurch (7)	1–0	Basford United (7)	322
35	Mickleover (7)	3–0	Ilkeston Town (7)	635
36	Halesowen Town (7)	7–0	Rugby Borough (9)	703
37	AFC Telford United (7)	0–1	Coalville Town (7)	
38	Nuneaton Borough (7)	1–2	Carlton Town (8)	352
39	Harborough Town (8)	3–1	Stamford (7)	378
40	Long Eaton United (7)	1–3	Stourbridge (7)	302
41	Gainsborough Trinity (7)	1–1	Matlock Town (7)	372
42	Leek Town (8)	5–0	Grimsby Borough (8)	303
43	Kirkley & Pakefield (9)	1–2	Witham Town (8)	108
44	Barton Rovers (8)	2–1	Milton Keynes Irish (9)	185
45	Hornchurch (7)	5–0	Fakenham Town (9)	598
46	Heybridge Swifts (8)	1–3	Gorleston (8)	220
47	Ware (8)	3–2	Dereham Town (9)	232
48	Bedford Town (8)	0–0	Walthamstow (8)	402
49	Hitchin Town (7)	2–1	Welwyn Garden City (8)	540
50	Hullbridge Sports (9)	0–1	Kettering Town (7)	224
51	Biggleswade Town (8)	5–1	New Salamis (8)	113
52	Woodford Town (9)	1–4	Felixstowe & Walton United (8)	225
53	Leighton Town (8)	1–6	Cambridge City (8)	727
55	Concord Rangers (7)	1–1	Wroxham (8)	160
56	Billericay Town (7)	7–0	Stowmarket Town (8)	495
57	Enfield Town (7)	3–0	Potters Bar Town (7)	555
58	Canvey Island (7)	5–1	Lowestoft Town (8)	335
59	Mildenhall Town (9)	0–5	AFC Sudbury (7)	
60	Hashtag United (7)	1–0	Brentwood Town (8)	411
61	FC Romania (9)	0–3	Needham Market (7)	71
62	Royston Town (7)	1–0	Cheshunt (7)	502
63	Leiston (7)	2–1	St Ives Town (7)	181
64	Brightlingsea Regent (8)	2–0	Sawbridgeworth Town (9)	245
65	Dulwich Hamlet (7)	1–1	Haringey Borough (7)	1,714
66	Berkhamsted (7)	5–4	Beckenham Town (8)	282

Tie	(Tier) Home team	Score	Away team (Tier)	Att.
67	Walton & Hersham (7)	1–3	Chesham United (7)	640
68	Whitstable Town (9)	2–3	Wingate & Finchley (7)	453
69	Eastbourne United (9)	2–1	Epsom & Ewell (9)	141
70	Redhill (9)	1–0	Herne Bay (8)	205
71	Chatham Town (7)	1–5	Ramsgate (8)	1,230
72	Hendon (7)	2–3	Margate (7)	263
73	Burgess Hill Town (8)	2–0	Bognor Regis Town (7)	434
74	Hartley Wintney (8)	0–4	Folkestone Invicta (7)	333
76	Sheppey United (8)	3–1	Kennington (9)	270
78	Lancing (8)	1–1	Carshalton Athletic (7)	263
79	Hythe Town (8)	0–2	Hanworth Villa (8)	319
80	Cray Wanderers (7)	5–1	Newhaven (9)	173
81	Leatherhead (8)	0–0	Horsham (7)	605
82	Sevenoaks Town (8)	0–0	Whitehawk (7)	304
83	Hayes & Yeading United (7)	2–1	Chertsey Town (8)	233
85	Marlow (8)	2–0	AFC Croydon Athletic (9)	243
86	Binfield (8)	2–2	Northwood (8)	127
88	Hadley (8)	0–0	Steyning Town (9)	167
89	Southall (8)	2–2	Beaconsfield Town (7)	118
90	Faversham Town (9)	0–4	Lewes (7)	260
91	Ascot United (8)	1–0	Westfield (8)	206
92	Knaphill (9)	1–0	Hanwell Town (7)	237
93	Harrow Borough (7)	0–2	Bracknell Town (7)	144
94	AFC Stoneham (9)	5–4	Basingstoke Town (7)	262
95	Swindon Supermarine (7)	1–2	Cribbs (8)	193
96	Okehampton Argyle (10)	1–3	Highworth Town (9)	
98	Mousehole (8)	5–3	Bashley (8)	156
99	AFC Totton (7)	5–1	Sholing (7)	544
100	Winchester City (7)	3–2	Evesham United (8)	322
101	Poole Town (7)	3–0	Barnstaple Town (9)	383
102	Horndean (8)	3–0	Bideford (8)	130
103	Hungerford Town (7)	4–0	Petersfield Town (9)	263
104	Frome Town (8)	3–1	Clevedon Town (9)	478
105	Reading City (9)	3–1	Shaftesbury (9)	264
106	Tiverton Town (7)	0–1	Wimborne Town (8)	248
107	Salisbury (7)	3–2	Bridgwater United (9)	371
109	Bishop's Cleeve (8)	2–3	Bristol Manor Farm (8)	130
110	Larkhall Athletic (8)	3–0	Moneyfields (9)	125
111	Merthyr Town (7)	5–1	Yate Town (8)	849
112	Plymouth Parkway (7)	2–0	Dorchester Town (7)	244
Sunday 3 September 2023
12	Whickham (9)	1–4	Macclesfield (7)	782
54	Biggleswade (8)	8–0	Maldon & Tiptree (8)	148
75	Kingstonian (7)	4–1	Lydd Town (9)	190
77	Uxbridge (8)	0–3	Cray Valley Paper Mills (8)	124
87	Erith & Belvedere (8)	0–0	Hastings United (7)	306
Wednesday 6 September 2023
84	Flackwell Heath (9)	1–2	Farnham Town (9)	
Wednesday 13 September 2023
108	Didcot Town (7)	5–1	Tadley Calleva (9)	294
Replays
Tuesday 5 September 2023
1R	West Auckland Town (9)	1–2	Bishop Auckland (9)	730
2R	Runcorn Linnets (8)	3–2	Charnock Richard (9)	531
14R	Marine (7)	3–0	Guiseley (7)	582
18R	Emley (9)	4–1	Widnes (8)	375
21R	Shifnal Town (9)	1–2	Nantwich Town (8)	455
41R	Matlock Town (7)	5–2	Gainsborough Trinity (7)	447
48R	Walthamstow (8)	0–5	Bedford Town (8)	281
55R	Wroxham (8)	3–0	Concord Rangers (7)	215
65R	Haringey Borough (7)	2–1	Dulwich Hamlet (7)	417
78R	Carshalton Athletic (7)	4–1	Lancing (8)	261
81R	Horsham (7)	2–1	Leatherhead (8)	692
82R	Whitehawk (7)	2–1	Sevenoaks Town (8)	251
86R	Northwood (8)	1–0	Binfield (8)	212
88R	Steyning Town (9)	3–2	Hadley (8)	210
89R	Beaconsfield Town (7)	2–3	Southall (8)	161
Wednesday 6 September 2023
26R	Darlaston Town (1874) (9)	2–2 (0–2 p)	Sporting Khalsa (8)	1,200
87R	Hastings United (7)	2−1	Erith & Belvedere (8)	607

=== Upsets ===
Giantkiller (tier)	Opponent (tier)
Upset of two leagues above
Knaphill (level 9)	1–0 at home vs Hanwell Town (level 7)
AFC Stoneham (level 9)	5–4 at home vs Basingstoke Town (level 7)

== Second qualifying round ==
The draw for the second qualifying round was made on 4 September 2023. 14 clubs (Tadcaster Albion, Lincoln United, Worcester City, Steyning Town, Knaphill, Eastbourne United, Farnham Town, Reading City, Highworth Town, Emley, AFC Stoneham, Redhill, Bishop Auckland and Albion Sports) from Level 9 progressed to this round.

Number of non-league teams per tier still in qualifying
National League (Note: National League teams joined in the fourth round of qualifying)	North/South	Premier Division	Division One	Regional	Step 6	Total
24 / 24	48 / 48	58 / 88	40 / 114	14 / 156	0 / 1	160 / 295

Tie	(Note: (9) represents teams allocated to divisions at the 9th tier of English football (otherwise known as Step 5 of the National League System). (8) represents the 8th tier (Step 4 NLS). (7) represents the 7th tier (Step 3 NLS). (6) represents the 6th tier (Step 2 NLS).)(Tier) Home team	Score	Away team (Tier)	Att.
Friday 15 September 2023
7	Darlington (6)	3–1	Workington (7)	982
47	Ascot United (8)	1–2	Lewes (7)	451
72	Merthyr Town (7)	1–1	Taunton Town (6)	1,583
Saturday 16 September 2023
1	Farsley Celtic (6)	1–1	Scarborough Athletic (6)	691
2	Blyth Spartans (6)	1–1	Bradford (Park Avenue) (7)	663
3	Hyde United (7)	2–1	Albion Sports (9)	430
4	FC United of Manchester (7)	0–4	Warrington Rylands 1906 (7)	1,046
5	Warrington Town (6)	2–3	Curzon Ashton (6)	733
6	Runcorn Linnets (8)	1–1	Chorley (6)	907
8	Lancaster City (7)	4–1	Marske United (7)	395
9	Spennymoor Town (6)	2–2	Marine (7)	573
10	Morpeth Town (7)	3–0	Southport (6)	272
11	Tadcaster Albion (9)	1–3	Chester (6)	777
12	South Shields (6)	2–0	Bishop Auckland (9)	1,081
13	Ashton United (7)	2–2	Atherton Collieries (7)	265
14	Whitby Town (7)	2–1	Prescot Cables (8)	508
15	Mossley (8)	1–1	Emley (9)	433
16	Halesowen Town (7)	5–2	Alvechurch (7)	1,157
17	Stourbridge (7)	2–0	Matlock Town (7)	840
18	Coalville Town (7)	2–1	Stafford Rangers (7)	489
19	Lincoln United (9)	0–3	Worksop Town (7)	334
20	Peterborough Sports (6)	0–0	Redditch United (7)	227
21	Nantwich Town (8)	2–1	Banbury United (6)	415
22	Barwell (7)	1–2	Bromsgrove Sporting (7)	251
23	Macclesfield (7)	2–0	Buxton (6)	2,274
24	Rushall Olympic (6)	3–2	Carlton Town (8)	315
25	Mickleover (7)	3–1	Spalding United (8)	324
26	Tamworth (6)	2–1	Harborough Town (8)	840
27	Hereford (6)	2–0	Anstey Nomads (8)	1,208
28	Worcester City (9)	0–2	Leek Town (8)	720
29	Cleethorpes Town (8)	2–4	Alfreton Town (6)	301
30	Scunthorpe United (6)	0–0	Brackley Town (6)	1,909
31	Boston United (6)	4–0	Leamington (7)	1,130
32	Kettering Town (7)	1–0	Sporting Khalsa (8)	683
33	Brightlingsea Regent (8)	1–3	Billericay Town (7)	317
34	Royston Town (7)	1–3	Hemel Hempstead Town (6)	512
35	King's Lynn Town (6)	0–0	Aveley (6)	570
36	Barton Rovers (8)	1–1	Wroxham (8)	188
37	Bishop's Stortford (6)	3–3	Biggleswade Town (8)	397
38	Leiston (7)	1–2	St Albans City (6)	235
39	Enfield Town (7)	3–0	Felixstowe & Walton United (8)	504
40	Ware (8)	3–3	Chelmsford City (6)	427
41	Canvey Island (7)	1–1	Braintree Town (6)	497
42	Bedford Town (8)	2–3	Gorleston (8)	413
44	Hitchin Town (7)	3–0	AFC Sudbury (7)	449
45	Hashtag United (7)	0–1	Needham Market (7)	245
46	Witham Town (8)	1–5	Hornchurch (7)	304
48	Haringey Borough (7)	4–2	Tonbridge Angels (6)	402
49	Bracknell Town (7)	2–1	Havant & Waterlooville (6)	292
50	Margate (7)	2–2	Folkestone Invicta (7)	692
51	Dartford (6)	2–3	Welling United (6)	1,031

Tie	(Tier) Home team	Score	Away team (Tier)	Att.
52	Sheppey United (8)	3–0	Burgess Hill Town (8)	278
53	Eastbourne Borough (6)	0–1	Worthing (6)	1,028
54	Steyning Town (9)	1–4	Maidstone United (6)	1,135
55	Hayes & Yeading United (7)	0–2	Slough Town (6)	326
56	Knaphill (9)	0–1	Hanworth Villa (8)	158
57	Carshalton Athletic (7)	4–0	Kingstonian (7)	522
59	Eastbourne United (9)	1–3	Berkhamsted (7)	171
60	Whitehawk (7)	4–0	Redhill (9)	559
61	Horsham (7)	2–2	Marlow (8)	739
62	Southall (8)	1–2	Hampton & Richmond Borough (6)	242
63	Farnham Town (9)	1–2	Chesham United (7)	1,114
64	Dover Athletic (6)	3–2	Hastings United (7)	559
65	Northwood (8)	2–2	Cray Valley Paper Mills (8)	159
67	Plymouth Parkway (7)	2–2	Frome Town (8)	386
68	Larkhall Athletic (8)	2–3	Bath City (6)	1,000
69	Weston-super-Mare (6)	2–0	Truro City (6)	468
70	Chippenham Town (6)	1–4	Hungerford Town (7)	380
71	Gloucester City (6)	0–3	AFC Totton (7)	681
73	Reading City (9)	1–1	Winchester City (7)	237
74	Highworth Town (9)	1–3	Weymouth (6)	412
75	Wimborne Town (8)	0–3	Torquay United (6)	1,852
76	Gosport Borough (7)	3–0	Cribbs (8)	548
77	Horndean (8)	0–3	Poole Town (7)	242
78	Mousehole (8)	0–5	Salisbury (7)	267
79	Didcot Town (7)	2–0	Bristol Manor Farm (8)	251
80	Yeovil Town (6)	7–1	AFC Stoneham (9)	2,021
Sunday 17 September 2023
43	Biggleswade (8)	1–2	Cambridge City (8)	308
58	Cray Wanderers (7)	2–2	Ramsgate (8)	258
66	Wingate & Finchley (7)	0–0	Farnborough (6)	219
Replays
Monday 18 September 2023
2R	Bradford (Park Avenue) (7)	1–3	Blyth Spartans (6)	322
20R	Redditch United (7)	1–3	Peterborough Sports (6)	281
35R	Aveley (6)	4–0	King's Lynn Town (6)	
40R	Chelmsford City (6)	2–1	Ware (8)	517
Tuesday 19 September 2023
1R	Scarborough Athletic (6)	3–0	Farsley Celtic (6)	958
6R	Chorley (6)	3–1	Runcorn Linnets (8)	603
9R	Marine (7)	2–1	Spennymoor Town (6)	660
13R	Atherton Collieries (7)	1–3	Ashton United (7)	258
15R	Emley (9)	3–1	Mossley (8)	412
30R	Brackley Town (6)	3–1	Scunthorpe United (6)	491
36R	Wroxham (8)	3–4	Barton Rovers (8)	194
37R	Biggleswade Town (8)	3–1	Bishop's Stortford (6)	178
41R	Braintree Town (6)	3–1	Canvey Island (7)	337
50R	Folkestone Invicta (7)	1–3	Margate (7)	467
61R	Marlow (8)	1–3	Horsham (7)	279
65R	Cray Valley Paper Mills (8)	4–3	Northwood (8)	132
66R	Farnborough (6)	6–0	Wingate & Finchley (7)	248
67R	Frome Town (8)	2–1	Plymouth Parkway (7)	312
72R	Taunton Town (6)	1–2	Merthyr Town (7)	774
73R	Winchester City (7)	4–1	Reading City (9)	203
Wednesday 20 September 2023
58R	Ramsgate (8)	3–2	Cray Wanderers (7)	357

== Third qualifying round ==
The draw for the third qualifying round was made on 18 September 2023. Emley was the sole team from Level 9 to progress to this stage.

Number of non-league teams per tier still in qualifying
National League (Note: National League teams joined in the fourth round of qualifying)	North/South	Premier Division	Division One	Regional	Step 6	Total
24 / 24	32 / 48	36 / 88	11 / 114	1 / 156	0 / 1	80 / 295

Tie	(Note: (9) represents teams allocated to divisions at the 9th tier of English football (otherwise known as Step 5 of the National League System). (8) represents the 8th tier (Step 4 NLS). (7) represents the 7th tier (Step 3 NLS). (6) represents the 6th tier (Step 2 NLS).)(Tier) Home team	Score	Away team (Tier)	Att.
Saturday 30 September 2023
1	Blyth Spartans (6)	1–1	Worksop Town (7)	738
2	Whitby Town (7)	1–0	Morpeth Town (7)	657
3	Darlington (6)	1–2	Scarborough Athletic (6)	1,369
4	Leek Town (8)	2–0	South Shields (6)	825
5	Lancaster City (7)	0–2	Ashton United (7)	346
6	Hyde United (7)	0–2	Marine (7)	620
7	Chester (6)	2–1	Nantwich Town (8)	2,162
8	Curzon Ashton (6)	2–1	Chorley (6)	275
9	Alfreton Town (6)	1–0	Emley (9)	446
10	Macclesfield (7)	2–1	Warrington Rylands 1906 (7)	1,429
11	Hereford (6)	3–0	Cambridge City (8)	1,550
12	Stourbridge (7)	2–0	Mickleover (7)	644
13	Hitchin Town (7)	0–1	Kettering Town (7)	832
14	Aveley (6)	2–2	Hornchurch (7)	679
15	Gorleston (8)	0–2	Hemel Hempstead Town (6)	370
16	Halesowen Town (7)	1–2	Enfield Town (7)	1,130
17	Biggleswade Town (8)	3–1	Barton Rovers (8)	284
18	Coalville Town (7)	0–2	Tamworth (6)	1,073
19	Bromsgrove Sporting (7)	2–2	Chelmsford City (6)	712
20	Rushall Olympic (6)	0–1	Boston United (6)	434
21	Peterborough Sports (6)	0–0	Needham Market (7)	333
22	Braintree Town (6)	3–2	Brackley Town (6)	443
23	Billericay Town (7)	1–0	St Albans City (6)	869
24	AFC Totton (7)	1–0	Berkhamsted (7)	486
25	Bracknell Town (7)	3–1	Poole Town (7)	290

Tie	(Tier) Home team	Score	Away team (Tier)	Att.
26	Farnborough (6)	0–1	Weston-super-Mare (6)	541
27	Dover Athletic (6)	2–1	Haringey Borough (7)	502
28	Merthyr Town (7)	1–4	Sheppey United (8)	989
29	Yeovil Town (6)	2–0	Didcot Town (7)	1,999
30	Salisbury (7)	0–0	Slough Town (6)	761
31	Gosport Borough (7)	2–2	Welling United (6)	1,023
32	Torquay United (6)	5–0	Hungerford Town (7)	1,648
33	Winchester City (7)	0–2	Maidstone United (6)	549
34	Carshalton Athletic (7)	3–3	Cray Valley Paper Mills (8)	543
35	Horsham (7)	3–1	Hanworth Villa (8)	916
36	Lewes (7)	3–0	Hampton & Richmond Borough (6)	1,001
37	Chesham United (7)	2–0	Margate (7)	658
38	Ramsgate (8)	2–1	Frome Town (8)	720
39	Worthing (6)	2–1	Whitehawk (7)	1,409
40	Weymouth (6)	1–2	Bath City (6)	1,085
Replays
Monday 2 October 2023
19R	Chelmsford City (6)	3–0	Bromsgrove Sporting (7)	526
Tuesday 3 October 2023
1R	Worksop Town (7)	5–0	Blyth Spartans (6)	517
14R	Hornchurch (7)	1–2	Aveley (6)	729
21R	Needham Market (7)	3–0	Peterborough Sports (6)	201
30R	Slough Town (6)	3–0	Salisbury (7)	411
34R	Cray Valley Paper Mills (8)	2–1	Carshalton Athletic (7)	195
Wednesday 4 October 2023
31R	Welling United (6)	4–2	Gosport Borough (7)	

== Fourth qualifying round ==
The draw for the fourth qualifying round was made on 2 October 2023. This round included five teams, Biggleswade Town, Leek Town, Ramsgate, Cray Valley Paper Mills and Sheppey United, from Level 8, the lowest-ranked teams left in the competition. The latter three sides in Ramsgate, Cray Valley Paper Mills and Sheppey United also became the lowest ranked sides this season to reach the first round proper, all three of which played in the Isthmian League South East Division.

Number of non-league teams per tier still in qualifying
National League	North/South	Premier Division	Division One	Regional	Step 6	Total
24 / 24	21 / 48	14 / 88	5 / 114	0 / 156	0 / 1	64 / 295

Tie	(Note: (8) represents teams allocated to divisions at the 8th tier of English football (otherwise known as Step 4 of the National League System). (7) represents the 7th tier (Step 3 NLS). (6) represents the 6th tier (Step 2 NLS). (5) represents the 5th tier (Step 1 NLS).)(Tier) Home team	Score	Away team (Tier)	Att.
Saturday 14 October 2023
1	Scarborough Athletic (6)	2–2	Oxford City (5)	1,836
2	Altrincham (5)	0–1	Oldham Athletic (5)	3,874
3	FC Halifax Town (5)	0–1	Marine (7)	1,646
4	Worksop Town (7)	3–2	Boston United (6)	1,684
5	AFC Fylde (5)	3–1	Leek Town (8)	930
6	Hereford (6)	1–0	Rochdale (5)	2,817
7	York City (5)	0–0	Needham Market (7)	1,867
8	Solihull Moors (5)	4–1	Biggleswade Town (8)	878
9	Chesterfield (5)	5–0	Kettering Town (7)	5,156
10	Alfreton Town (6)	3–1	Macclesfield (7)	956
11	Hartlepool United (5)	0–2	Chester (6)	3,205
12	Chelmsford City (6)	2–2	Whitby Town (7)	1,053
13	Curzon Ashton (6)	1–0	Tamworth (6)	581
14	Kidderminster Harriers (5)	2–0	Ashton United (7)	2,064
15	Stourbridge (7)	0–3	Gateshead (5)	1,465
16	Aldershot Town (5)	4–1	Lewes (7)	1,758
17	Torquay United (6)	0–2	Maidstone United (6)	1,636
18	AFC Totton (7)	0–1	Ramsgate (8)	1,283
19	Aveley (6)	2–2	Barnet (5)	919
20	Hemel Hempstead Town (6)	0–0	Woking (5)	1,305
21	Horsham (7)	2–0	Dorking Wanderers (5)	1,980
22	Eastleigh (5)	1–0	Dover Athletic (6)	1,401
23	Yeovil Town (6)	2–0	Southend United (5)	2,697

Tie	(Tier) Home team	Score	Away team (Tier)	Att.
24	Bromley (5)	3–2	Wealdstone (5)	1,933
25	Weston-super-Mare (6)	0–3	Maidenhead United (5)	843
26	Braintree Town (6)	0–0	Chesham United (7)	879
27	Bracknell Town (7)	1–0	Dagenham & Redbridge (5)	722
28	Worthing (6)	2–0	Bath City (6)	1,883
29	Boreham Wood (5)	1–0	Welling United (6)	756
30	Cray Valley Paper Mills (8)	5–2	Enfield Town (7)	579
31	Ebbsfleet United (5)	2–2	Slough Town (6)	1,134
32	Billericay Town (7)	1–1	Sheppey United (8)	1,241
Replays
Tuesday 17 October 2023
1R	Oxford City (5)	2–3	Scarborough Athletic (6)	602
7R	Needham Market (7)	0–1	York City (5)	604
12R	Whitby Town (7)	3–1	Chelmsford City (6)	943
19R	Barnet (5)	4–0	Aveley (6)	641
20R	Woking (5)	2–0	Hemel Hempstead Town (6)	1,006
26R	Chesham United (7)	3–1 (a.e.t.)	Braintree Town (6)	826
31R	Slough Town (6)	2–0	Ebbsfleet United (5)	779
32R	Sheppey United (8)	1–1 (5–4 p)	Billericay Town (7)	1,235

Number of non-league teams per tier that qualified for the competition
National League	North/South	Premier Division	Division One	Regional	Step 6	Total
15 / 24	9 / 48	5 / 88	3 / 114	0 / 156	0 / 1	32 / 295
