= 2019–20 Northern Counties East Football League =

The 2019–20 Northern Counties East Football League season was the 38th in the history of Northern Counties East Football League, a football competition in England.

The allocations for Steps 1 to 6 for season 2019–20 were announced by the FA on 19 May. These were subject to appeal, and the Northern Counties East's constitution was ratified at the league's AGM on 15 June.

As a result of the COVID-19 pandemic, this season's competition was formally abandoned on 26 March 2020, with all results from the season being expunged, and no promotion or relegation taking place to, from, or within the competition. On 30 March 2020, sixty-six non-league clubs sent an open letter to the Football Association requesting that they reconsider their decision.

== Premier Division ==
Northern Counties East Football League Premier Division
- Season: 2019–20
- Matches: 263
- Goals: 976 (3.71 per match)

The Premier Division featured 17 clubs which competed in the previous season, along with three new clubs:

- Grimsby Borough, promoted from Division One
- AFC Mansfield, voluntary demoted from the Northern Premier League
- Silsden, transferred from the North West Counties League

=== League table ===
Pos	Team	Pld	W	D	L	GF	GA	GD	Pts
1	Staveley Miners Welfare	26	17	4	5	59	26	+33	55
2	Liversedge	24	16	5	3	80	42	+38	53
3	Yorkshire Amateur	26	16	5	5	60	27	+33	53
4	Penistone Church	28	15	8	5	58	32	+26	53
5	Bridlington Town	25	14	6	5	52	33	+19	48
6	Hemsworth Miners Welfare	28	13	6	9	53	42	+11	45
7	Maltby Main	28	13	4	11	44	46	−2	43
8	Garforth Town	28	12	5	11	54	58	−4	41
9	Grimsby Borough	26	13	1	12	59	53	+6	40
10	Silsden	28	10	7	11	46	51	−5	37
11	Barton Town	27	11	3	13	51	51	0	36
12	Eccleshill United	25	11	2	12	47	45	+2	35
13	Knaresborough Town	25	9	5	11	42	39	+3	32
14	Thackley	26	9	5	12	48	53	−5	32
15	Handsworth	23	8	6	9	39	55	−16	30
16	AFC Mansfield	26	7	7	12	33	43	−10	28
17	Goole	28	7	4	17	40	61	−21	25
18	Bottesford Town	27	7	2	18	43	71	−28	23
19	Albion Sports	25	6	4	15	39	55	−16	22
20	Athersley Recreation	27	3	3	21	29	93	−64	12

Updated to match(es) played on 11 March 2020. Source: NCE Tables
Rules for classification: 1) Points; 2) Goal difference; 3) Number of goals scored; 4) Number of matches won; 5) Head-to-head results

=== Stadia and locations ===
Location of the clubs in the 2019–20 NCEL Premier
Division on a map of Yorkshire and the Humber

Club	Stadium	Capacity
Albion Sports	Throstle Nest (Note: home of Farsley Celtic (groundshare))	3,500
Athersley Recreation	Sheerien Park	2,000
Barton Town	Euronics Ground	3,000
Bottesford Town	Birch Park	1,000
Bridlington Town	Queensgate	3,000
Eccleshill United	Kings Way	2,225
Garforth Town	Wheatley Park	3,000
Goole	Victoria Pleasure Grounds	3,000
Grimsby Borough	Bradley Football Centre	1,000
Handsworth	Sandy Lane	2,500
Hemsworth Miners Welfare	Fitzwilliam Stadium	2,000
Knaresborough Town	Manse Lane	1,000
Liversedge	Clayborn Ground	2,000
Maltby Main	Muglet Lane	2,000
AFC Mansfield	Forest Town Stadium	
Penistone Church	Church View Road	1,000
Silsden	Keighley Road Stadium	1,500
Staveley Miners Welfare	Inkersall Road	5,000
Thackley	Dennyfield	3,000
Yorkshire Amateur	Bracken Edge	1,550

== Division One ==
Northern Counties East Football League Division One
- Season: 2019–20
- Matches: 257
- Goals: 936 (3.64 per match)

Division One featured 15 clubs which competed in the previous season, along with three new clubs:

- Brigg Town, promoted from the Lincolnshire League
- Hall Road Rangers, relegated from the Premier Division
- Harrogate Railway Athletic, relegated from the Premier Division
- North Ferriby, new club formed after North Ferriby United folded
- Retford, promoted from the Central Midlands League

Also, East Yorkshire Carnegie were renamed as East Hull.

=== League table ===
Pos	Team	Pld	W	D	L	GF	GA	GD	Pts	
1	Winterton Rangers	27	19	2	6	48	24	+24	59	
2	Skegness Town	26	18	4	4	58	19	+39	58	
3	Selby Town	25	18	2	5	86	40	+46	56	
4	North Ferriby	26	15	7	4	45	17	+28	52	
5	Campion	24	15	3	6	67	37	+30	48	
6	Retford	28	12	8	8	52	46	+6	44	
7	Glasshoughton Welfare	26	14	1	11	58	47	+11	43	
8	Hallam	23	10	7	6	41	30	+11	37	
9	Swallownest	25	11	4	10	44	43	+1	37	
10	Nostell Miners Welfare	25	11	2	12	55	42	+13	35	
11	Dronfield Town	25	10	5	10	50	43	+7	35	
12	Armthorpe Welfare	28	10	4	14	39	47	−8	34	
13	Parkgate	25	10	4	11	35	51	−16	34	
14	Rossington Main	26	8	7	11	40	46	−6	31	
15	Brigg Town	30	8	6	16	44	63	−19	30	
16	Ollerton Town	26	7	7	12	41	39	+2	28	Transferred to the East Midlands Counties League
17	Hall Road Rangers	24	8	4	12	44	52	−8	28	
18	Worsbrough Bridge Athletic	24	6	5	13	40	50	−10	23	
19	Harrogate Railway Athletic	25	5	1	19	33	68	−35	16	
20	East Hull	26	0	1	25	16	132	−116	1	

Updated to match(es) played on 11 March 2020. Source: NCE tables
Rules for classification: 1) Points; 2) Goal difference; 3) Number of goals scored; 4) Number of matches won; 5) Head-to-head results

=== Results ===
Home \ Away	ARM	BRI	CAM	DRO	EHU	GLS	HRR	HAL	HRA	NRF	NOS	OLL	PAR	RET	ROS	SEL	SKE	SWA	WIN	WOR
Armthorpe Welfare	—		1–2										0–1	2–2						1–0
Brigg Town		—			6–2										2–2				1–2	
Campion	4–1	2–2	—									2–1								
Dronfield Town		1–1		—		1–2	2–2				1–0						1–3			6–1
East Hull	0–2		0–5		—						0–6							0–5		
Glasshoughton Welfare						—							3–4			2–3				
Hall Road Rangers			0–6		9–0		—								2–2			2–3	1–3	
Hallam								—												
Harrogate Railway Athletic									—											
North Ferriby										—										
Nostell Miners Welfare			4–1								—	4–2				3–2				
Ollerton Town	1–1				2–1		2–3					—						1–0	1–1	1–1
Parkgate		0–3				3–2	3–1						—				0–2			1–5
Retford		4–1		4–4									1–2	—						4–2
Rossington Main						3–2					3–2			0–1	—			1–1		
Selby Town		2–1		3–2			4–1					4–0				—	1–1			
Skegness Town					7–0			3–0						0–0	3–1		—			
Swallownest	0–3		1–2									1–1				0–5		—		
Winterton Rangers					6–0	3–0					0–2							1–0	—	
Worsbrough Bridge Athletic						1–2								2–2			0–3			—

Updated to match(es) played on unknown. Source:
Legend: Blue = home team win; Yellow = draw; Red = away team win.

=== Stadia & locations ===
Location of the clubs in the 2019–20
NCEL Division One on a map of
Yorkshire and the Humber

Club	Stadium	Capacity
Armthorpe Welfare	Welfare Ground	2,500
Brigg Town	The Hawthorns	2,500
Campion	Scotchman Road	
Dronfield Town	Stonelow Ground	500
East Hull	Dene Park	2,000
Glasshoughton Welfare	Glasshoughton Centre	2,000
Hallam	Sandygate Road	1,000
Hall Road Rangers	Haworth Park	1,200
Harrogate Railway Athletic	Station View	3,500
North Ferriby	The Dransfield Stadium	3,000
Nostell Miners Welfare	The Welfare Ground	1,500
Ollerton Town	Walesby Lane	
Parkgate	Roundwood Sports Complex	1,000
Retford	The Rail	1,000
Rossington Main	Welfare Ground	2,000
Selby Town	Richard Street	5,000
Skegness Town	Vertigo Stadium	
Swallownest	Miners Welfare Ground	
Winterton Rangers	West Street	3,000
Worsbrough Bridge Athletic	Park Road	2,000

== League Cup ==
2019–20 Northern Counties East Football League League Cup
Tournament details
- Country: England

The 2019–20 Northern Counties East Football League League Cup is the 37th season of the league cup competition of the Northern Counties East Football League.
