= 2020–21 East Midlands Counties Football League =

The 2020–21 East Midlands Counties Football League season was the 13th and final season of the East Midlands Counties Football League, a football competition in England at level 10 of the English football league system. The allocations for Steps 3 to 6 for season 2020–21 were announced by the FA on 21 July 2020.

The season started in September and was suspended in December a result of the COVID-19 pandemic. The league season was subsequently abandoned in February 2021.

== Promotions and restructuring ==
The scheduled restructuring of non-League took place at the end of the season, with new divisions added to the Combined Counties and United Counties leagues at Step 5 for 2021–22, along with new a division in the Northern Premier League at step 4. Promotions from Steps 6 to 5 were based on points per game across all matches over the two cancelled seasons (2019–20 and 2020–21), while teams were promoted into Step 6 on the basis of a subjective application process. The East Midlands Counties League disbanded after most of its remaining clubs were assigned to the Northern Counties East and United Counties leagues' Step 6 divisions.

== Premier Division ==
East Midlands Counties Football League
- Season: 2020–21
- Promoted: Eastwood; Heanor Town; Sherwood Colliery
- Matches: 105
- Goals: 395 (3.76 per match)

The league featured 19 clubs from the previous season, along with one new club:

- Ollerton Town, transferred from the Northern Counties East League Division One

=== League table ===
Pos	Team	Pld	W	D	L	GF	GA	GD	Pts	Promotion or qualification
1	Ollerton Town	12	9	2	1	35	5	+30	29	Transferred to the Northern Counties East League
2	Sherwood Colliery	9	9	0	0	34	8	+26	27	Promoted to the Northern Counties East League (Note: Promoted based on points per game calculations from 2019–20 and 2020–21 seasons combined.)
3	Belper United	13	8	1	4	36	23	+13	25	Transferred to the United Counties League
4	Eastwood	12	8	0	4	24	17	+7	24	Promoted to the United Counties League
5	Clifton All Whites	11	6	1	4	25	16	+9	19	Transferred to the United Counties League
6	Rainworth Miners Welfare	10	6	1	3	19	15	+4	19	Transferred to the Northern Counties East League
7	Hucknall Town	9	6	0	3	27	13	+14	18	Transferred to the United Counties League
8	Kimberley Miners Welfare	12	5	1	6	28	25	+3	16	Transferred to the United Counties League
9	Clipstone	11	4	3	4	22	19	+3	15	Transferred to the Northern Counties East League
10	Heanor Town	10	5	0	5	19	20	−1	15	Promoted to the United Counties League
11	Dunkirk	10	4	2	4	20	19	+1	14	Transferred to the United Counties League
12	Barrow Town	12	4	1	7	22	39	−17	13	Transferred to the United Counties League
13	Shirebrook Town	12	3	3	6	14	30	−16	12	Transferred to the Northern Counties East League
14	Gedling Miners Welfare	8	3	1	4	16	17	−1	10	Transferred to the United Counties League
15	West Bridgford	10	2	4	4	12	16	−4	10	Transferred to the United Counties League
16	Ingles	12	2	3	7	12	29	−17	9	Transferred to the United Counties League
17	Graham Street Prims	9	2	2	5	7	17	−10	8	Transferred to the United Counties League
18	Borrowash Victoria	11	2	2	7	9	24	−15	8	Transferred to the United Counties League
19	Teversal	11	2	0	9	8	29	−21	6	Transferred to the Northern Counties East League
20	Radford	6	1	1	4	6	14	−8	4	Transferred to the United Counties League

Source: FA Full-Time

=== Stadia and locations ===
Location of the clubs in the 2019–20 East Midlands Counties League on a map of the East Midlands

Club	Stadium
Barrow Town	Riverside Park
Belper United	Christchurch Meadow (Note: home of Belper Town (groundshare))
Borrowash Victoria	Asterdale Bowl (Note: part of the same complex as Graham Street Prims)
Clifton All Whites	Green Lane
Clipstone	Lido Ground
Dunkirk	Lenton Lane
Eastwood	Coronation Park
Gedling Miners Welfare	Plains Road
Graham Street Prims	Asterdale Sports Ground (Note: part of the same complex as Borrowash Victoria)
Heanor Town	Town Ground
Hucknall Town	Watnall Road
Ingles	The Dovecote Stadium (Note: home of Shepshed Albion (groundshare))
Kimberley Miners Welfare	Stag Ground
Ollerton Town	Walesby Lane
Radford	Selhurst Street
Rainworth Miners Welfare	Kirklington Road
Sherwood Colliery	Debdale Park
Shirebrook Town	Langwith Road
Teversal	Carnarvon Street
West Bridgford	Regatta Way
