= North Ferriby F.C. =

Association football club in England

North Ferriby
- Full name: North Ferriby Football Club
- Nickname: The Villagers
- Founded: 2019; 7 years ago
- Ground: Versa Sportswear Stadium, North Ferriby
- Capacity: 3,000 (500 seated)
- Coordinates: 53°43′02.42″N 0°30′00.61″W
- Owner(s): Les Hare, Martin Lauer, Jim Dick, Simon Lunt
- Chairman: Les Hare
- Manager: Chris Bolder
- League: Northern Premier League Division One East
- 2025–26: Northern Premier League Division One East, 11th of 22
- Website: https://northferribyfc.co.uk
Home colours	Away colours

North Ferriby Football Club is a football club based in North Ferriby, a village in the Haltemprice area of the East Riding of Yorkshire, England. Established in 2019 after North Ferriby United folded, they are currently members of the Northern Premier League Division One East, the eighth tier of English football and play at The Versa Sportswear Stadium.

== History ==
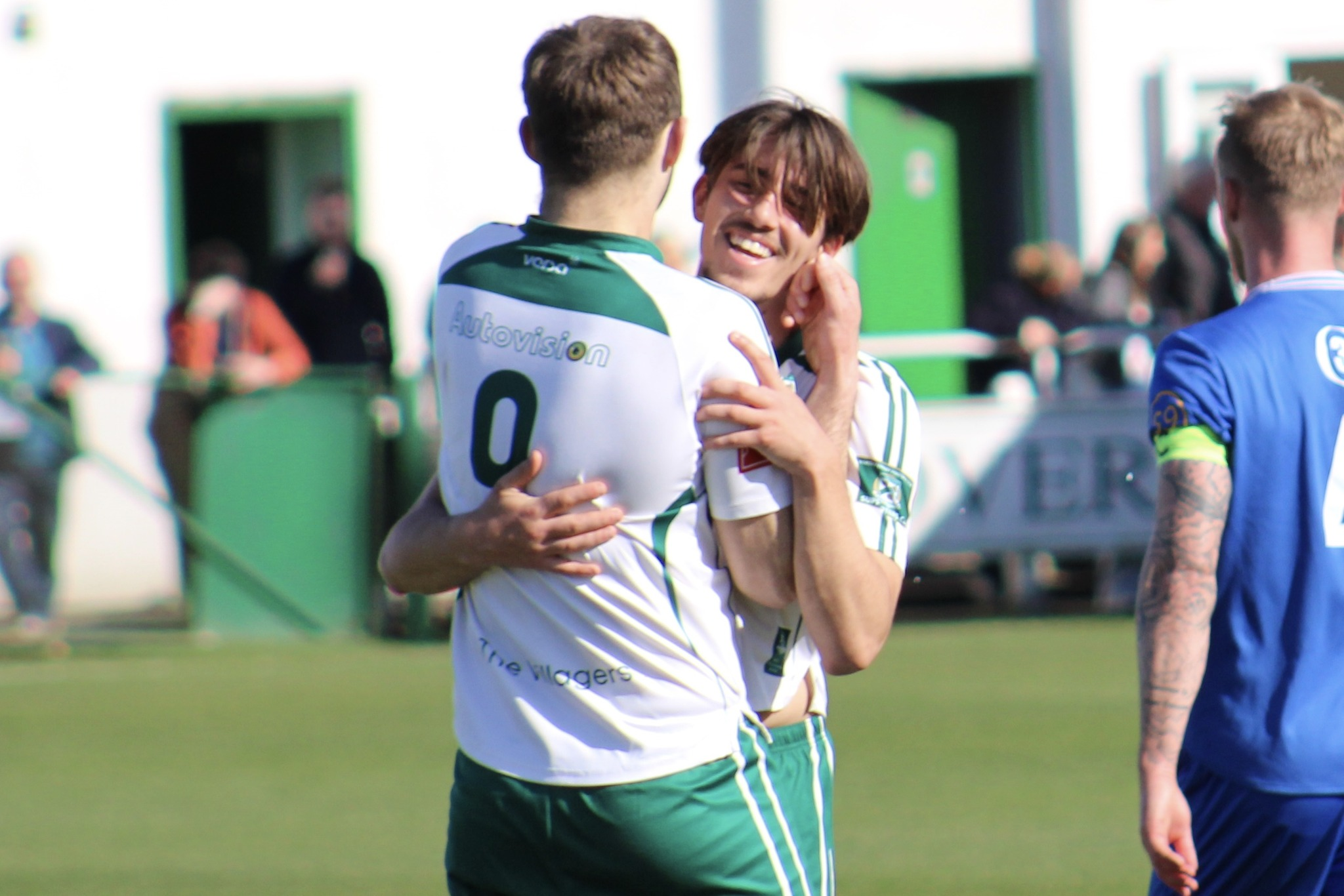
Arun Jones celebrates his goal for North Ferriby v Grimsby Borough

North Ferriby United were wound up by the High Court in March 2019, with their 2018–19 season record in the Northern Premier League Premier Division expunged. North Ferriby F.C. was established as a replacement, playing at the previous club's Grange Lane ground. The club was recognised by the Football Association and entered the Northern Counties East League for the 2019–20 season.

== Current squad ==
As of 21 August 2026

Note: Flags indicate national team as defined under FIFA eligibility rules; some limited exceptions apply. Players may hold more than one non-FIFA nationality.

No.	Pos.	Nation	Player
—	GK	ENG	Jonathan Dash
—	GK	ENG	Jordan Douglas
—	DF	ENG	Charlie Carlisle
—	DF	ENG	Josh Clackstone
—	DF	ENG	Benn Lewis
—	DF	ENG	Liam Love
—	DF	ENG	Brandon Murillo
—	DF	ENG	Josh Thacker
—	DF	ENG	Jack Walters

No.	Pos.	Nation	Player
—	DF	ENG	James Williamson
—	MF	ENG	Olly Green
—	MF	ENG	Mason Johnson
—	MF	ENG	Arun Jones
—	MF	ENG	Lucas Robinson
—	FW	ENG	Jack Boyle
—	FW	ENG	Jake Day
—	FW	ENG	Lewis Dennison
—	FW	ENG	Charlie Dunkerley

== Records ==
- Best FA Cup performance: First qualifying round, 2023–24, 2026-27
- Best FA Trophy performance: First round, 2023–24
- Best FA Vase performance: Fourth round, 2020–21
- Largest league attendance: 1,442 vs Harrogate Railway Athletic F.C., 23 April 2022, NCEL Division One Play Off Final.
- Smallest league attendance: 150 vs many teams due to COVID-19 attendance restrictions during the 2020–21 NCEL Division One.
