= Clipstone F.C. =

Association football club in England

Coordinates: 53°09′34.39″N 1°07′47.76″W

- Full name: Clipstone Football Club
- Nickname: The Cobras
- Founded: 1928
- Ground: Lido Ground, Clipstone
- Capacity: 500 (100 seated)
- Chairman: Richard Clarey
- Manager: Richard Hannigan
- League: United Counties League Division One
- 2024–25: United Counties League Division One, 5th of 19
- Website: clipstonefc.co.uk
Home colours	Away colours

Clipstone Football Club is a football club based in Clipstone, Nottinghamshire, England. They are currently members of the United Counties League Division One and play at the Lido Ground.

== History ==
The club was established in 1928 as Clipstone Combine, playing in the Colliery Alliance League. They were later renamed Clipstone Boys Brigade before becoming Clipstone Welfare when they started playing in the Mansfield & District League. The club later joined the Sutton & Skegby League and then the Nottingham Spartan League, which they won in 1955–56, alongside the League Cup and Notts Intermediate Cup.

Clipstone subsequently joined the Notts Alliance, winning both the Senior Division and the League Cup in three successive seasons between 1972–73 and 1974–75. In 1985–86 the club won the Notts Senior Cup. The club won back-to-back league titles in 1992–93 and 1993–94, also winning the League Cup and the Notts Senior Cup in the latter season. They moved up to the Premier Division of the Central Midland League in 1994 and won the division at the first attempt, but were denied promotion due to their ground failing to meet league requirements. After winning Division One again in 1996–97, and having made the necessary ground improvements, the club were promoted to the Supreme Division. In 2006–07 they won the league's Floodlit Cup, beating Barton Town Old Boys 3–1 in the final. The club remained in the Supreme Division until league reorganisation in 2011 saw them placed in the Northern Division.

After a fourth-place finish in the North Division in 2011–12, Clipstone were accepted into Division One of the Northern Counties East League. The club adopted its current name in 2013, and were Division One champions in 2014–15, earning promotion to the Premier Division. They finished bottom of the Premier Division in 2017–18 and were relegated to the East Midlands Counties League. At the end of the 2020–21 season the East Midlands Counties League was dissolved and the club were transferred to Division One of the Northern Counties East League. After one season in the Northern Counties East League, they were transferred to Division One of the United Counties League.

In 2023–24 Clipstone were runners-up in Division One, qualifying for the promotion play-offs. However, they were beaten 4–1 in the semi-finals by Harrowby United. Following a fifth-place finish the following season, the club were beaten 4–0 by Retford in the play-off semi-finals.

== Ground ==
The club originally played at a ground near Mansfield Road, before moving to Baulker Lane when they were renamed Clipstone Boys Brigade. They moved to their current Lido Ground when they joined the Notts Alliance. The ground currently has a capacity of 500, of which 100 is seated and 200 covered.

== Honours ==
- Northern Counties East League
  - Division One champions 2014–15
- Central Midlands League
  - Premier Division Champions 1994–95, 1996–97
  - Floodlit Cup winners 2006–07
- Notts Alliance
  - Senior Division Champions 1972–73, 1973–74, 1974–75, 1992–93, 1993–94
  - League Cup winners 1972–73, 1973–74, 1974–75, 1993–94
- Nottingham Spartan League
  - Champions 1955–56
  - League Cup Winners 1955–56
- Notts Senior Cup
  - Winners 1985–86, 1993–94
- Notts Intermediate Cup
  - Winners 1955–56

== Records ==
- Best FA Cup performance: First qualifying round, 2014–15, 2015–16
- Best FA Vase performance: Third round, 1992–93

== See also ==
- Clipstone F.C. players
- Clipstone F.C. managers
