= Lincoln United F.C. =

English football club

Lincoln United
- Full name: Lincoln United Football Club
- Nicknames: The Whites, The Amateurs
- Founded: 1938 (as Lincoln Amateurs)
- Ground: Ashby Avenue, Lincoln
- Capacity: 2,714 (400 seated)
- Chairman: Stuart Reddington
- Manager: Dave Frecklington
- League: Northern Premier League Division One East
- 2025–26: Northern Premier League Division One East, 13th of 22
Home colours	Away colours

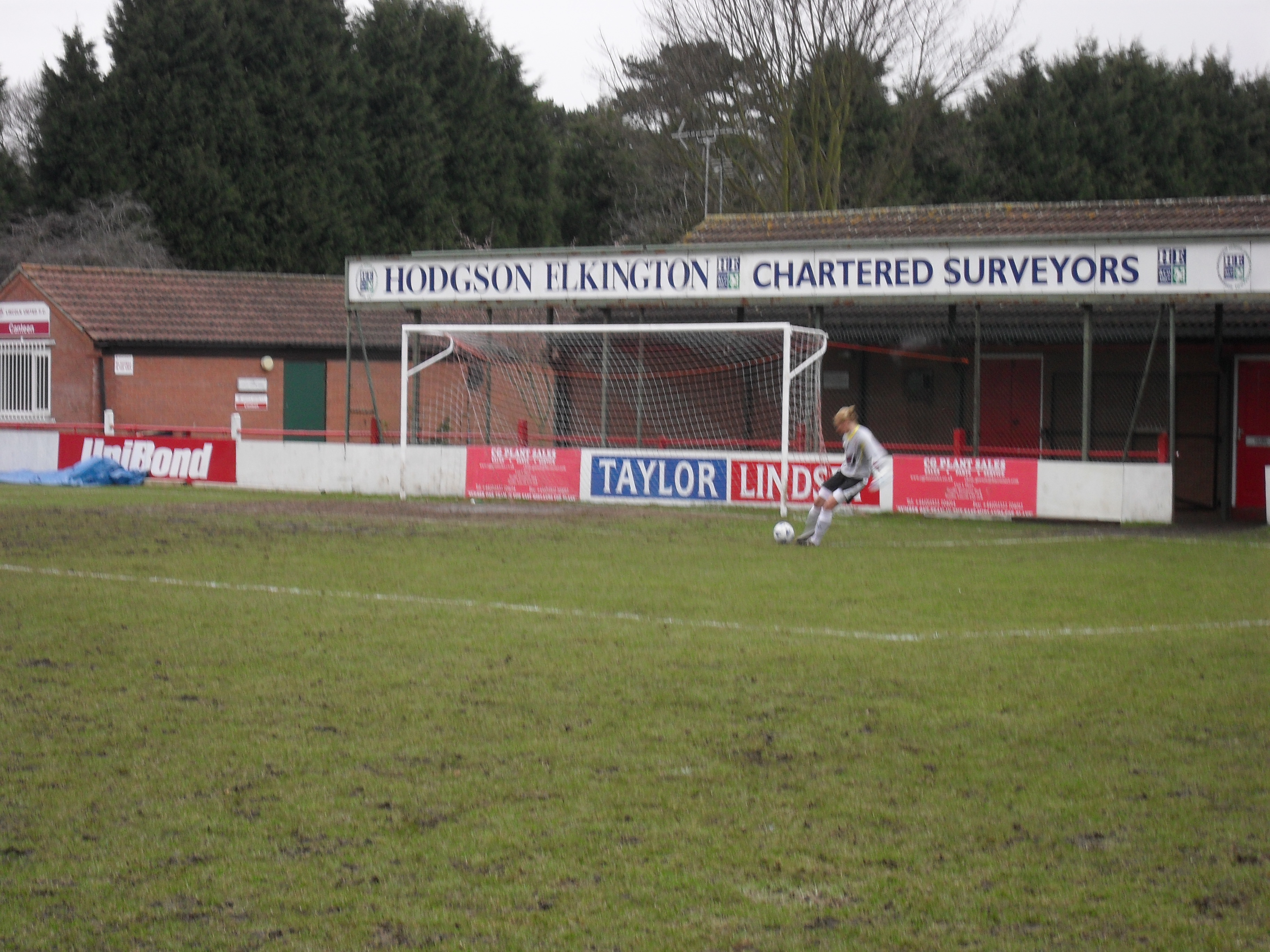
Ashby Avenue

Lincoln United Football Club is a football club based in Lincoln, Lincolnshire, England. They are currently members of the Northern Premier League Division One East and play at Ashby Avenue. Nicknamed the Whites after their home kit colours, they have played at Ashby Avenue since their foundation in 1938.

== History ==
The club was established in 1938 as Lincoln Amateurs, but World War II prevented them from joining a league until 1945, when they became members of the Lincolnshire League. The following season saw them transfer to the Lincoln League, and in 1954 the club were renamed Lincoln United after taking on a paid player, Ray Bean. In 1960 they rejoined the Lincolnshire League and went on to win the league title in 1963–64. The club moved up to Division Two of the Yorkshire League in 1967 and won the division at the first attempt, earning promotion to Division One.

Lincoln United were Division One champions in 1970–71 and again in 1973–74. However, after finishing bottom of the division in 1978–79, the club were relegated to Division Two. A third-place finish in Division Two in 1980–81 saw them promoted back to Division One. In 1981 the Yorkshire League merged with the Midland League to form the Northern Counties East League, with Lincoln placed in Division One South. Although they won the division in the league's inaugural season, the club were not promoted. League reorganisation in 1985 led to Lincoln being placed in Division Two. Although they won the division at the first attempt, the club left the league to join the newly formed Supreme Division of the Central Midlands League.

The 1991–92 season saw Lincoln United reach the first round of the FA Cup for the first time, losing 7–0 at Huddersfield Town; this was the first (and still the only) time a club from the Central Midlands League reached the FA Cup first round. They went on to win the Supreme Division at the end of the season and moved back up to Division One of the Northern Counties East League. The following season saw the club win the Division One title, securing promotion to the Premier Division. They went on to win the Premier Division in 1994–95 and were promoted to Division One of the Northern Premier League.

The next two seasons saw Lincoln finish third in Division One, narrowly missing out on the two promotion places. In 1997–98 they reached the FA Cup first round again, losing 2–0 at Walsall. A fourth-place finish in 2003–04 was enough for promotion to the Premier Division, with the creation of the Conference North and South seeing numerous clubs promoted to fill the new divisions. However, the club were relegated in 2007–08 after finishing bottom of the Premier Division, dropping into Division One South. In 2015–16 they finished fifth in the division, qualifying for the promotion play-offs for the first time. In the play-offs the club were beaten 3–2 in the semi-finals by Shaw Lane. The following season the club won the Lincolnshire Senior Cup for the first time, beating Stamford 3–2 in the final.

In 2022–23 Lincoln finished third-from-bottom of Division One East of the Northern Premier League, resulting in them facing an inter-step play-off with a club from the division below. After being beaten 2–1 by Avro they were relegated to the Premier Division North of the United Counties League. They were runners-up in the division the following season, subsequently losing 3–1 to Skegness Town in the play-off semi-finals. In 2024–25 the club were Premier Division North champions, earning promotion back to Division One East of the Northern Premier League.

=== Women's team ===
Originally founded in 2017 as Hykeham Town Ladies, the club was renamed Lincoln United Women in 2020 when the club amalgamated with Lincoln United. The club were then members of the East Midlands Regional Women's League Premier Division, having been promoted from Division One North following the curtailed 2019–20 season. In 2022–23 the team won the Lincolnshire FA County Women's Cup for the first time, defeating Lincoln City Women 2–0 in the final. In 2023–24 the team completed a treble, winning all 18 league games to secure the league title and earn promotion to Division One Midlands of the FA Women's National League, as well as winning the League Cup and the Lincolnshire FA County Women's Cup.

== Staff ==
Position	Incumbent
Manager	Dave Frecklington
Assistant Manager	Darren Dye
Assistant Manager	James Morgan
Physio	Tom Philips
Physio	Jessica Squires

== Honours ==
- United Counties League
  - Premier Division North champions 2024–25
- Northern Counties East League
  - Premier Division champions 1994–95
  - Division One champions 1992–93
  - Division One South champions 1982–83
  - Division Two champions 1985–86
  - Presidents Cup winners 1993–94
- Yorkshire League
  - Division One champions 1970–71, 1973–74
  - Division Two champions 1967–68
- Central Midlands League
  - Supreme Division champions 1991–92
- Lincolnshire League
  - Champions 1963–64
- Lincolnshire Senior Shield
  - Winners 2005–06
- Lincolnshire Senior Cup
  - Winners 2016–17
- Lincolnshire Senior A Cup
  - Winners 1972–73, 1985–86, 1995–96
- Lincolnshire Senior B Cup
  - Winners 1963–64, 1970–71
- Lincolnshire Intermediate Cup
  - Winners 1967–68, 1968–69, 1969–70, 1970–71, 1971–72, 1972–73, 1980–81
- Lincolnshire Junior Cup
  - Winners 1955–56

== Records ==
- Best FA Cup performance: First round 1991–92, 1997–98
- Best FA Trophy performance: Third round 1998–99
- Best FA Vase performance: Semi-finals, 2023–24
- Record attendance: 2,000 vs Crook Town, FA Amateur Cup first round, 1968

== See also ==
- Lincoln United F.C. players
- Lincoln United F.C. managers
