= Ollerton Town F.C. =

Association football club in England

Coordinates: 53°12′24.99″N 1°00′46.81″W

Ollerton Town
- Full name: Ollerton Town Football Club
- Nickname: "The Town"
- Founded: 1988
- Ground: Walesby Lane Sports Ground
- Chairman: Liam Kent
- Manager: Lee Cook
- League: Central Midlands Alliance Premier Division North
Home colours

Ollerton Town Football Club is a football club based in Ollerton, Nottinghamshire, England. The men's team play in the Central Midlands Alliance Premier Division North whilst the ladies team plays in the East Midlands Women's Regional Football League.

== History ==
Ollerton has a long history of local football going back to the late 1800s. One of its best periods was immediately before the Second World War; when Ollerton Colliery reached three Notts Senior Cup finals in a row from 1936 to 1939, winning it in 1937/38. Its reserve team also won the Notts Intermediate Cup the year previous.

In 1930, a side called Ollerton Forest defeated Welbeck Athletic 3–0 in the North Notts Senior Cup final at Mansfield Town's Field Mill stadium. This is believed to be the first competitive football game in England to be played under floodlights and more can be read about it here.

Ollerton Colliery ceased as a football club in the early 1980s but was reformed as Ollerton & Bevercotes F.C in 1988. The club won the Nottinghamshire Football Alliance Division Two championship in 1992–93, gaining promotion to Division One under the management of Adge Owen and David Kent.

Following the closure of the colliery in 1994, the club changed its name to Ollerton Town F.C. In the same year, Ollerton were champions of Division One in 1995–96 and were promoted to the top division of the Notts Alliance. After finishing runners-up in 1999–2000, the club was promoted to the Central Midlands League and entered the English Football Pyramid.

In the 2007–08 season, Ollerton, under the management of Don Gethfield, David Kent and Anthony Thompson, the club won the Central Midlands Premier Division, earning promotion to the Supreme Division. That season they also reached the Nottinghamshire Senior Cup final where they were beaten 2–0 by Eastwood Town.

In 2008–09, the club took part in the FA Vase for the first time, getting to the second round proper in 2009–10.

After the resignation of Don Gethfield in 2011, and a brief stint under Paul Rawden, the club appointed Dave Winter as first team manager, with Stephen Bodle as his assistant. The former Kirkby Town pair guided the club to the Central Midlands Floodlit Cup final in their first season.

For the 2011–12 season, the club was placed in the Central Midlands North Division following a league restructure.

In the 2015–16 season, with former-captain Jamie Allan now also on board as first team coach, the club secured promotion to the Northern Counties East League after finishing runners-up in the Central Midlands North Division.

After several seasons in the NCEL Division One, Ollerton Town were moved laterally into the East Midlands Counties League for the start of the 2020–21 Season. The club topped the division after 12 games, winning 9 of them, but the season was brought to a premature end due to the Coronavirus pandemic.

In May 2021, Dave Winter resigned from his role as first team manager after almost ten years, and over 360 games, in charge. The club moved quickly to appoint Stephen Bodle as his replacement, with Lee Needham assisting him moving forward. At the end of the 2020–21 season the East Midlands Counties League was dissolved and the club were transferred to Division One of the Northern Counties East League.

Full League History
Season	League	Placing
1988-1989	Mansfield Bitter League	N/A
1989-1990	Mansfield Bitter League	N/A
1990-1991	Notts Alliance Division Two	5th
1991-1992	Notts Alliance Division Two	3rd
1992-1993	Notts Alliance Division Two	1st
1993-1994	Notts Alliance Division One	5th
1994-1995	Notts Alliance Division One	9th
1995-1996	Notts Alliance Division One	1st
1996-1997	Notts Alliance Senior Division	14th
1997-1998	Notts Alliance Senior Division	10th
1998-1999	Notts Alliance Senior Division	11th
1999-2000	Notts Alliance Senior Division	2nd
2000-2001	Central Midlands Premier Division	11th
2001-2002	Central Midlands Premier Division	11th
2002-2003	Central Midlands Premier Division	6th
2003-2004	Central Midlands Premier Division	8th
2004-2005	Central Midlands Premier Division	10th
2005-2006	Central Midlands Premier Division	10th
2006-2007	Central Midlands Premier Division	13th
2007-2008	Central Midlands Premier Division	1st
2008-2009	Central Midlands Supreme Division	4th
2009-2010	Central Midlands Supreme Division	3rd
2010-2011	Central Midlands Supreme Division	13th
2011-2012	Central Midlands Supreme Division	7th
2012-2013	Central Midlands Supreme Division	6th
2013-2014	Central Midlands North Division	8th
2014-2015	Central Midlands North Division	10th
2015-2016	Central Midlands North Division	2nd
2016-2017	Northern Counties East League Division One	17th
2017-2018	Northern Counties East League Division One	15th
2018-2019	Northern Counties East League Division One	16th
2019-2020	Northern Counties East League Division One	Voided
2020–2021	East Midlands Counties League	Curtailed
2021–2022	Northern Counties East League Division One	12th
2022–2023	Northern Counties East League Division One	13th
2023–2024	Northern Counties East League Division One	23rd
2024–2025	Central Midlands Alliance Premier Division North	12th

== Ground ==
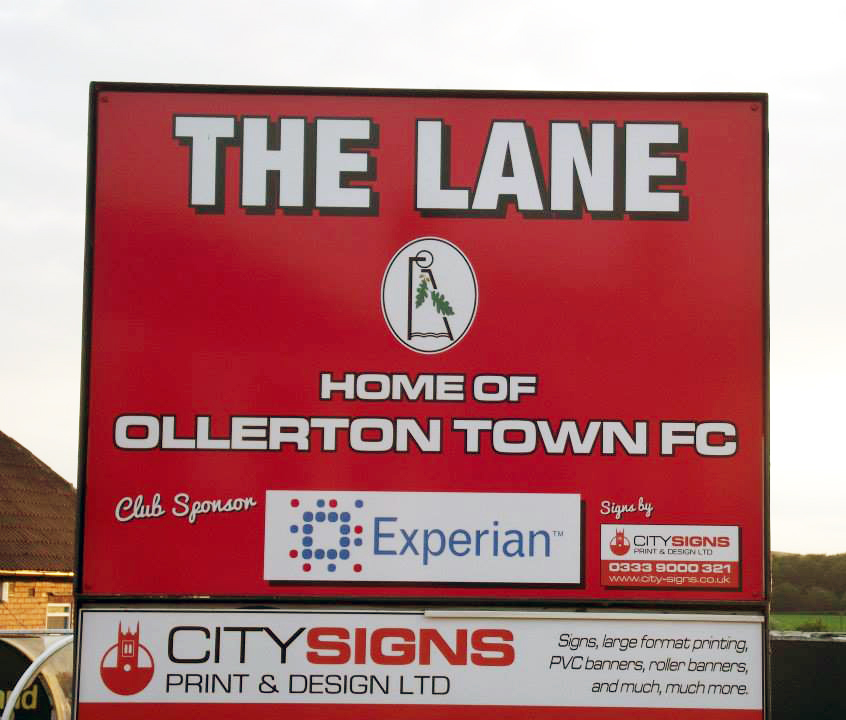

The club's ground is situated on Walesby Lane in Ollerton. Previously referred to as "The Lane", in 2018, the club announced a sponsorship deal with Nottinghamshire company FastFrameUK which saw the window and door retailer secure the naming rights of the ground,

The ground was previously shared with Ollerton Cricket Club up until the start of the 2018–2019 season when the cricket club sadly folded.

There is a small pavilion playing host to the changing rooms for both teams where post-match hospitality also occurs.

The pitch itself is floodlit and has two large stands running down two ends to provide cover for spectators. Three sides of the pitch also have hard standing in keeping with the ground grading required for Step 6 football.

A small porta-cabin behind the pitch offers refreshments for visiting spectators with a variety of drinks and snacks on offer.

One side of the pitch backs on to a row of near-by houses and it is on this side where two large, brick built dug outs have been constructed with seats in to keep the players and management dry. Each dug-out could easily hold around 8 players/staff.

== Honours ==
Ollerton Town have won three league championships:

- Central Midlands League North Division
  - Runners-up 2015–2016
- Central Midlands League Floodlit Cup
  - Runners-up 2011–2012
- Central Midlands League Premier Division
  - Champions 2007–08
- Nottinghamshire Senior Cup
  - Runners-up 2007–2008
- Central Midlands League League Cup
  - Runners-up 2006–2007
- Notts Alliance
  - Runners-up 1999–2000
- Notts Alliance Division One
  - Champions 1995–96
- Notts Alliance Division Two
  - Champions 1992–93
