= Sherwood Colliery F.C. =

Association football club in England

Coordinates: 53°9′40.8″N 1°12′22.4″W

Sherwood Colliery
- Full name: Sherwood Colliery Football Club
- Nickname: The Wood
- Founded: 2008
- Ground: Debdale Park
- Chairman: Mike Staton
- Manager: Wayne Savage
- League: United Counties League Premier Division North
- 2025–26: United Counties League Premier Division North, 2nd of 20
Home colours	Away colours

Sherwood Colliery F.C. is an English football club based in Mansfield Woodhouse, Nottinghamshire. They are members of the United Counties League Premier Division North. The club is a FA Charter Standard Club affiliated to the Nottinghamshire County Football Association. The club's nickname is The Wood.

== History ==
The club was formed in 2008, although a club of the same name did compete in the FA Cup in the late 1940s and early 1950s. They joined the Central Midlands League in 2012, and entered the FA Vase for the first time in 2016 where they beat both Penistone Church and Clipstone both of higher divisions before being knocked out 3–2 by Westfields. The 2017–18 season saw the club finish as runners-up in the league and subsequently gain promotion to the East Midlands Counties Football League. The 2019–20 season saw the club enter the FA Cup for the first time, getting past Quorn F.C. in the extra preliminary round, before losing out to Loughborough Dynamo in a replay in the next round. In 2021, the club were promoted to the Premier Division of the Northern Counties East League based on their results in the abandoned 2019–20 and 2020–21 seasons. The 2023–24 season saw Colliery promoted as champions to the eighth tier. They were, however, relegated straight back, finishing 20th in the 2024-25 Season in the Northern Premier League.

== Ground ==
The club play their home games at Debdale Park.

== Honours ==
League

- United Counties League Premier Division North
  - Champions: 2023-24
- Midland Amateur Alliance Division One
  - Champions: 2010-11

Cup

- Central Midlands Football League Floodlit Cup
  - Winners: 2016–17

== Records ==
- Best FA Cup performance: First qualifying round, 2021–22, 2023–24, 2025–26, 2026–27
- Best FA Trophy performance: Second qualifying round, 2024–25
- Best FA Vase performance: Fourth round, 2025–26
