= Retford F.C. =

Association football club in England

Coordinates: 53°19′19.4″N 0°57′28.9″W

Retford F.C
- Full name: Retford Football Club
- Nickname: The Choughs
- Short name: RFC
- Founded: 2015
- Ground: Green bros. Rail Stadium
- Capacity: 3500 (seats 250) cover 100
- Chairman: Chris Woodhead
- Manager: Chris Woodhead
- League: Northern Counties East League Premier Division
- 2025–26: United Counties League Division One, 1st of 23 (promoted)
Home colours

Retford Football Club is an English football club based in Retford, Nottinghamshire. They currently play in the Northern Counties East League Premier Division.

== History ==
The club was formed in 2015 by Chris Woodhead and Kevin Swannack. They joined the Central Midlands League and entered the FA Vase for the first time a year later.

Retford FC were crowned champions of the Central Midlands North Division 2018/19 season

2019/20 season will see them play in the Northern Counties East League Division One.

After defeat in the play-off final in 2024/25, Retford FC went on to win the United Counties League Division One title in 2025/26 after a 2-2 draw at their local rivals, Retford United.

== Stadium ==
The club moved to The Rail in 2017 after ground sharing with Retford United.

The ground has been developed over the short time they have been in situ with floodlights installed, an all seater stand and the necessary requirements for ground grading for the Northern Counties East League all met.

The ground is adjacent to the East Coast Main Line where it can be viewed from the trains passing, and a good vantage point of the ground is from the road bridge on Babworth Road.

Major developments have taken place over the Summer of 2024 with the changing rooms extended, a new hospitality suite built, new floodlights and upgraded surrounds to the pitch and supporter areas making it one of the best facilities in Retford.

== Honours ==
- Central Midlands League
  - North Division champions 2018–19
- United Counties League
  - Division One Champions 2025-26

== Records ==
- Record attendance: 1,359 vs. Retford United, United Counties League Division One, 27 December 2025
- Best FA Cup performance: Preliminary round, 2026–27
- Best FA Vase performance: Third round, 2026–27
