= 2010–11 Northern Counties East Football League =

The 2010–11 Northern Counties East Football League season was the 29th in the history of Northern Counties East Football League, a football competition in England.

== Premier Division ==
Northern Counties East Football League Premier Division
- Season: 2010–11
- Champions: Farsley
- Promoted: Farsley
- Relegated: Dinnington Town; Hallam
- Matches: 380
- Goals: 1,365 (3.59 per match)

The Premier Division featured 17 clubs which competed in the previous season, along with three new clubs:

- Brighouse Town, promoted from Division One
- Farsley, new club formed after Farsley Celtic were expelled from the Conference North in March 2010 and folded
- Tadcaster Albion, promoted from Division One

=== League table ===
Pos	Team	Pld	W	D	L	GF	GA	GD	Pts	Promotion or relegation
1	Farsley	38	27	4	7	108	41	+67	85	Promoted to the Northern Premier League Division One North
2	Parkgate	38	23	9	6	94	55	+39	78	
3	Bridlington Town	38	20	11	7	94	55	+39	71	
4	Tadcaster Albion	38	20	8	10	90	62	+28	68	
5	Winterton Rangers	38	18	11	9	73	52	+21	65	
6	Lincoln Moorlands Railway	38	17	10	11	90	58	+32	61	
7	Pickering Town	38	18	7	13	81	71	+10	61	
8	Thackley	38	17	9	12	66	50	+16	60	
9	Nostell Miners Welfare	38	16	8	14	60	66	−6	56	
10	Scarborough Athletic	38	15	9	14	69	61	+8	54	
11	Maltby Main	38	15	9	14	59	61	−2	54	
12	Long Eaton United	38	14	12	12	47	59	−12	54	
13	Armthorpe Welfare	38	13	9	16	68	76	−8	48	
14	Hall Road Rangers	38	14	6	18	58	70	−12	48	
15	Selby Town	38	15	3	20	54	75	−21	48	
16	Brighouse Town	38	11	8	19	58	77	−19	41	
17	Liversedge	38	7	12	19	52	76	−24	32 (Note: Liversedge were deducted 1 point.)	
18	Arnold Town	38	6	12	20	61	95	−34	30	
19	Hallam	38	7	6	25	48	96	−48	27	Relegated to Division One
20	Dinnington Town	38	3	5	30	35	109	−74	14	Relegated to Division One

Source: fchd
Rules for classification: 1) points; 2) goal difference; 3) number of goals scored.

== Division One ==
Northern Counties East Football League Division One
- Season: 2010–11
- Champions: Barton Town Old Boys
- Promoted: Barton Town Old Boys; Staveley Miners Welfare
- Matches: 380
- Goals: 1,358 (3.57 per match)

Division One featured 16 clubs which competed in the previous season, along with four new clubs:

- Brodsworth Welfare, relegated from the Premier Division
- Handsworth, promoted from the Sheffield and Hallamshire County Senior League
- Louth Town, promoted from the Central Midlands League
- Shirebrook Town, relegated from the Premier Division

=== League table ===
Pos	Team	Pld	W	D	L	GF	GA	GD	Pts	Promotion or relegation
1	Staveley Miners Welfare	38	26	6	6	95	46	+49	84	Promoted to the Premier Division
2	Barton Town Old Boys	38	23	8	7	97	45	+52	77	Promoted to the Premier Division
3	Yorkshire Amateur	38	23	6	9	81	36	+45	75	
4	Handsworth	38	24	3	11	98	66	+32	75	
5	Pontefract Collieries	38	19	11	8	85	51	+34	68	
6	Louth Town	38	18	8	12	76	59	+17	62	
7	Glasshoughton Welfare	38	19	5	14	65	48	+17	62	
8	AFC Emley	38	18	8	12	63	47	+16	62	
9	Askern Villa	38	17	6	15	66	68	−2	57	
10	Eccleshill United	38	17	5	16	76	62	+14	56	
11	Leeds Carnegie	38	16	7	15	55	56	−1	55	Club folded
12	Worsbrough Bridge Athletic	38	16	7	15	58	62	−4	55	
13	Shirebrook Town	38	16	4	18	67	72	−5	52	
14	Rossington Main	38	15	4	19	74	82	−8	49	
15	Grimsby Borough	38	13	8	17	69	69	0	47	
16	Hemsworth Miners Welfare	38	12	6	20	64	82	−18	42	
17	Bottesford Town	38	10	10	18	56	69	−13	40	
18	Teversal	38	11	5	22	58	78	−20	38	
19	Appleby Frodingham	38	6	3	29	38	116	−78	21	
20	Brodsworth Welfare	38	0	2	36	17	144	−127	2	Resigned from the league

Source: fchd
Rules for classification: 1) points; 2) goal difference; 3) number of goals scored.
