= 1975–76 Yorkshire Football League =

The 1975–76 Yorkshire Football League was the 50th season in the history of the Yorkshire Football League, a football competition in England.

== Division One ==
Yorkshire Football League Division One
- Season: 1975–76
- Champions: Emley
- Relegated: Farsley Celtic; Frecheville Community Association; Maltby Miners Welfare; Worsbrough Bridge Miners Welfare Athletic
- Matches played: 240
- Goals scored: 735 (3.06 per match)

Division One featured 12 clubs which competed in the previous season, along with four new clubs, promoted from Division Two:

- Bridlington Town
- Maltby Miners Welfare
- Pickering Town
- Redfearn National Glass

=== League table ===
Pos	Team	Pld	W	D	L	GF	GA	GD	Pts	Qualification or relegation
1	Emley	30	21	7	2	68	25	+43	49	
2	North Ferriby United	30	21	4	5	70	25	+45	46	
3	Hallam	30	15	4	11	58	44	+14	34	
4	Bridlington Town	30	14	6	10	41	38	+3	34	
5	Leeds & Carnegie College	30	14	5	11	52	40	+12	33	
6	Thackley	30	10	13	7	28	26	+2	33	
7	Hatfield Main	30	11	10	9	48	45	+3	32	
8	Redfearn National Glass	30	11	10	9	45	47	−2	32	
9	Ossett Albion	30	12	6	12	46	43	+3	30	
10	Winterton Rangers	30	10	8	12	44	44	0	28	
11	Lincoln United	30	10	7	13	41	50	−9	27	
12	Pickering Town	30	9	8	13	36	49	−13	26	
13	Farsley Celtic	30	7	9	14	28	46	−18	23	Relegated to Division Two
14	Maltby Miners Welfare	30	9	3	18	45	70	−25	21	Relegated to Division Two
15	Worsbrough Bridge Miners Welfare Athletic	30	8	1	21	41	60	−19	17	Relegated to Division Two
16	Frecheville Community Association	30	6	3	21	44	83	−39	15	Relegated to Division Two

Source: fchd
Rules for classification: 1) points; 2) goal difference; 3) number of goals scored.
The points system until the 1990–91 season: 2 points for a win, 1 point for a draw and 0 points for losing.

=== Map ===
Location of the clubs in the 1975–76 Yorkshire League Division One on a map of Yorkshire and the Humber

== Division Two ==
Yorkshire Football League Division Two
- Season: 1975–76
- Champions: Guiseley
- Promoted: Denaby United; Guiseley; Leeds Ashley Road; Liversedge
- Relegated: Bentley Victoria Welfare; Hall Road Rangers; Stocksbridge Works
- Matches played: 210
- Goals scored: 640 (3.05 per match)

Division Two featured eight clubs which competed in the previous season, along with eight new clubs.

- Clubs relegated from Division One:
  - Denaby United
  - Guiseley
  - Yorkshire Amateur
- Clubs promoted from Division Three:
  - Norton Woodseats
  - Selby Town
  - Stocksbridge Works
  - Tadcaster Albion

=== League table ===
Pos	Team	Pld	W	D	L	GF	GA	GD	Pts	Qualification or relegation
1	Guiseley	28	19	7	2	69	26	+43	45	Promoted to Division One
2	Leeds Ashley Road	28	18	7	3	58	23	+35	43	Promoted to Division One
3	Liversedge	28	14	10	4	47	25	+22	38	Promoted to Division One
4	Denaby United	28	16	3	9	44	32	+12	35	Promoted to Division One
5	Kiveton Park	28	15	4	9	50	28	+22	34	
6	Woolley Miners Welfare	28	13	6	9	54	49	+5	32	
7	Tadcaster Albion	28	13	5	10	55	55	0	31	
8	Barton Town	28	9	12	7	40	32	+8	30	
9	Selby Town	28	9	8	11	28	34	−6	26	
10	Norton Woodseats	28	11	3	14	47	48	−1	25	
11	Yorkshire Amateur	28	4	11	13	29	56	−27	19	
12	Harrogate Town	28	5	8	15	30	51	−21	18	
13	Bentley Victoria Welfare	28	4	10	14	29	50	−21	18	Relegated to Division Three
14	Hall Road Rangers	28	5	5	18	29	62	−33	15	Relegated to Division Three
15	Stocksbridge Works	28	3	5	20	31	69	−38	11	Relegated to Division Three

Source: fchd
Rules for classification: 1) points; 2) goal difference; 3) number of goals scored.
The points system until the 1990–91 season: 2 points for a win, 1 point for a draw and 0 points for losing.

=== Map ===
Location of the clubs in the 1975–76 Yorkshire League Division Two on a map of Yorkshire and the Humber

== Division Three ==
Yorkshire Football League Division Three
- Season: 1975–76
- Champions: Rawmarsh Welfare
- Promoted: Ossett Albion; Rawmarsh Welfare; Scarborough reserves Sheffield
- Matches played: 240
- Goals scored: 766 (3.19 per match)

Division Three featured ten clubs which competed in the previous season, along with six new clubs.

- Clubs relegated from Division Two:
  - Ossett Town
  - Rawmarsh Welfare
  - Scarborough reserves
- Plus:
  - Collingham
  - Dodworth Miners Welfare
  - Rossington Miners Welfare

=== League table ===
Pos	Team	Pld	W	D	L	GF	GA	GD	Pts	Qualification or relegation
1	Rawmarsh Welfare	30	20	5	5	62	21	+41	45	Promoted to Division Two
2	Scarborough reserves	30	20	5	5	74	40	+34	45	Promoted to Division Two
3	Ossett Town	30	20	5	5	60	34	+26	45	Promoted to Division Two
4	Sheffield	30	14	9	7	50	29	+21	37	Promoted to Division Two
5	BSC Parkgate	30	13	9	8	53	52	+1	35	
6	Thorne Colliery	30	13	6	11	55	42	+13	32	
7	Brook Sports	30	14	2	14	51	38	+13	30	
8	Wombwell Sporting Association	30	12	6	12	43	42	+1	30	
9	Collingham	30	11	8	11	46	45	+1	30	
10	Dodworth Miners Welfare	30	9	11	10	46	44	+2	29	
11	Sheffield Waterworks	30	11	6	13	44	51	−7	28	
12	St. John's College (York)	30	7	10	13	49	54	−5	24	
13	Heeley Amateurs	30	10	4	16	43	63	−20	24	
14	Rossington Miners Welfare	30	6	9	15	24	42	−18	21	
15	York Railway Institute	30	5	5	20	40	73	−33	15	
16	Brodsworth Miners Welfare	30	4	2	24	26	96	−70	10	Resigned to the Doncaster & District Senior League

Source: fchd
Rules for classification: 1) points; 2) goal difference; 3) number of goals scored.
The points system until the 1990–91 season: 2 points for a win, 1 point for a draw and 0 points for losing.

=== Map ===
St. John's College (York)
Location of the clubs in the 1975–76 Yorkshire League Division Three on a map of Yorkshire and the Humber

== League Cup ==
1975–76 Yorkshire Football League League Cup
Tournament details
- Country: England

=== Final ===
Ossett Albion	2–0	Scarborough reserves
