= 1976–77 Yorkshire Football League =

The 1976–77 Yorkshire Football League was the 51st season in the history of the Yorkshire Football League, a football competition in England.

== Division One ==
Yorkshire Football League Division One
- Season: 1976–77
- Champions: Winterton Rangers
- Relegated: Hatfield Main; Liversedge; Pickering Town
- Matches played: 240
- Goals scored: 755 (3.15 per match)

Division One featured 12 clubs which competed in the previous season, along with four new clubs, promoted from Division Two:

- Denaby United
- Guiseley
- Leeds Ashley Road
- Liversedge

=== League table ===
Pos	Team	Pld	W	D	L	GF	GA	GD	Pts	Qualification or relegation
1	Winterton Rangers	30	17	10	3	77	31	+46	44	
2	Emley	30	18	8	4	66	38	+28	44	
3	Ossett Albion	30	17	5	8	51	28	+23	39	
4	Guiseley	30	18	3	9	55	37	+18	39	
5	Leeds Ashley Road	30	16	6	8	48	35	+13	38	
6	Thackley	30	14	9	7	44	26	+18	37	
7	Hallam	30	14	9	7	47	33	+14	37	
8	North Ferriby United	30	14	8	8	62	38	+24	36	
9	Bridlington Town	30	9	10	11	45	43	+2	28	
10	Leeds & Carnegie Polytechnic	30	11	3	16	45	42	+3	25	
11	Lincoln United	30	8	9	13	45	51	−6	25	
12	Denaby United	30	8	7	15	40	60	−20	23	
13	Redfearn National Glass	30	7	9	14	40	64	−24	23	Resigned to the Barnsley League
14	Liversedge	30	7	6	17	37	57	−20	20	Relegated to Division Two
15	Hatfield Main	30	3	7	20	30	87	−57	13	Relegated to Division Two
16	Pickering Town	30	4	1	25	23	85	−62	9	Relegated to Division Two

Source: fchd
Rules for classification: 1) points; 2) goal difference; 3) number of goals scored.
The points system until the 1990–91 season: 2 points for a win, 1 point for a draw and 0 points for losing.

=== Map ===
Location of the clubs in the 1976–77 Yorkshire League Division One on a map of Yorkshire and the Humber

== Division Two ==
Yorkshire Football League Division Two
- Season: 1976–77
- Champions: Sheffield
- Promoted: Farsley Celtic; Frecheville Community Association; Sheffield; Tadcaster Albion
- Relegated: Rawmarsh Welfare; Selby Town; Woolley Miners Welfare; Yorkshire Amateur
- Matches played: 240
- Goals scored: 694 (2.89 per match)

Division Two featured eight clubs which competed in the previous season, along with eight new clubs.

- Clubs relegated from Division One:
  - Farsley Celtic
  - Frecheville Community Association
  - Maltby Miners Welfare
  - Worsbrough Bridge Miners Welfare Athletic
- Clubs promoted from Division Three:
  - Ossett Town
  - Rawmarsh Welfare
  - Scarborough reserves
  - Sheffield

=== League table ===
Pos	Team	Pld	W	D	L	GF	GA	GD	Pts	Qualification or relegation
1	Sheffield	30	15	10	5	42	26	+16	40	Promoted to Division One
2	Tadcaster Albion	30	15	7	8	53	33	+20	37	Promoted to Division One
3	Frecheville Community Association	30	14	9	7	50	33	+17	37	Promoted to Division One
4	Farsley Celtic	30	16	4	10	42	24	+18	36	Promoted to Division One
5	Ossett Town	30	14	8	8	48	31	+17	36	
6	Barton Town	30	10	14	6	48	38	+10	34	
7	Kiveton Park	30	11	10	9	45	45	0	32	
8	Norton Woodseats	30	11	9	10	48	41	+7	31	
9	Worsbrough Bridge Miners Welfare Athletic	30	11	9	10	49	45	+4	31	
10	Harrogate Town	30	9	12	9	45	50	−5	30	
11	Maltby Miners Welfare	30	9	11	10	47	55	−8	29	
12	Scarborough reserves	30	10	8	12	43	48	−5	28	
13	Yorkshire Amateur	30	6	15	9	34	39	−5	27	Relegated to Division Three
14	Rawmarsh Welfare	30	5	10	15	32	49	−17	20	Relegated to Division Three
15	Woolley Miners Welfare	30	7	4	19	42	71	−29	18	Relegated to Division Three
16	Selby Town	30	3	8	19	26	66	−40	14	Relegated to Division Three

Source: fchd
Rules for classification: 1) points; 2) goal difference; 3) number of goals scored.
The points system until the 1990–91 season: 2 points for a win, 1 point for a draw and 0 points for losing.

=== Map ===
Location of the clubs in the 1976–77 Yorkshire League Division Two on a map of Yorkshire and the Humber

== Division Three ==
Yorkshire Football League Division Three
- Season: 1976–77
- Champions: Bentley Victoria Welfare
- Promoted: Bentley Victoria Welfare; Brook Sports; Collingham; Fryston Colliery Welfare
- Matches played: 240
- Goals scored: 784 (3.27 per match)

Division Three featured eleven clubs which competed in the previous season, along with five new clubs.

- Clubs relegated from Division Two:
  - Bentley Victoria Welfare
  - Hall Road Rangers
  - Stocksbridge Works
- Plus:
  - Fryston Colliery Welfare
  - Pilkington Recreation

=== League table ===
Pos	Team	Pld	W	D	L	GF	GA	GD	Pts	Qualification or relegation
1	Bentley Victoria Welfare	30	19	6	5	70	38	+32	44	Promoted to Division Two
2	Fryston Colliery Welfare	30	16	6	8	64	39	+25	38	Promoted to Division Two
3	Brook Sports	30	15	6	9	54	33	+21	36	Promoted to Division Two
4	Collingham	30	13	10	7	51	34	+17	36	Promoted to Division Two
5	Hall Road Rangers	30	14	7	9	50	35	+15	35	
6	Thorne Colliery	30	13	7	10	47	38	+9	33	
7	York Railway Institute	30	12	8	10	68	64	+4	32	
8	Dodworth Miners Welfare	30	11	9	10	50	57	−7	31	
9	Wombwell Sporting Association	30	11	9	10	36	44	−8	31	
10	Sheffield Waterworks	30	10	8	12	41	41	0	28	
11	St. John's College (York)	30	11	6	13	58	61	−3	28	
12	Rossington Miners Welfare	30	9	6	15	46	55	−9	24	
13	Stocksbridge Works	30	10	4	16	40	60	−20	24	
14	BSC Parkgate	30	8	5	17	41	59	−18	21	
15	Heeley Amateurs	30	7	9	14	38	63	−25	19 (Note: Heeley Amateurs were deducted 4 points.)	Resigned from the league
16	Pilkington Recreation	30	4	8	18	30	63	−33	16	

Source: fchd
Rules for classification: 1) points; 2) goal difference; 3) number of goals scored.
The points system until the 1990–91 season: 2 points for a win, 1 point for a draw and 0 points for losing.

=== Map ===
St. John's College (York)
Location of the clubs in the 1976–77 Yorkshire League Division Three on a map of Yorkshire and the Humber

== League Cup ==
1976–77 Yorkshire Football League League Cup
Tournament details
- Country: England

=== Final ===
Ossett Albion	3–1	Emley
