= 2011–12 Northern Counties East Football League =

The 2011–12 Northern Counties East Football League season was the 30th in the history of Northern Counties East Football League, a football competition in England.

== Premier Division ==
Northern Counties East Football League Premier Division
- Season: 2011–12
- Champions: Retford United
- Relegated: Selby Town
- Matches: 380
- Goals: 1,391 (3.66 per match)

The Premier Division featured 17 clubs which competed in the previous season, along with three new clubs:

- Barton Town Old Boys, promoted from Division One
- Retford United, demoted from the Northern Premier League
- Staveley Miners Welfare, promoted from Division One

=== League table ===
Pos	Team	Pld	W	D	L	GF	GA	GD	Pts	Promotion or relegation
1	Retford United	38	25	10	3	97	42	+55	85	
2	Bridlington Town	38	26	6	6	114	54	+60	84	
3	Scarborough Athletic	38	23	5	10	96	50	+46	74	
4	Brighouse Town	38	23	4	11	94	60	+34	73	
5	Staveley Miners Welfare	38	22	5	11	66	52	+14	71	
6	Winterton Rangers	38	21	5	12	71	49	+22	68	
7	Parkgate	38	20	7	11	99	72	+27	67	
8	Tadcaster Albion	38	20	7	11	68	50	+18	67	
9	Arnold Town	38	18	9	11	71	61	+10	63	
10	Thackley	38	18	8	12	71	59	+12	62	
11	Barton Town Old Boys	38	16	5	17	74	77	−3	53	
12	Pickering Town	38	15	6	17	74	75	−1	51	
13	Armthorpe Welfare	38	15	5	18	72	73	−1	50	
14	Liversedge	38	12	5	21	62	80	−18	41	
15	Long Eaton United	38	9	7	22	40	65	−25	34	
16	Hall Road Rangers	38	11	4	23	57	86	−29	34 (Note: Hall Road Rangers were deducted 3 point for fielding an ineligible player.)	
17	Nostell Miners Welfare	38	8	8	22	60	98	−38	32	
18	Maltby Main	38	7	8	23	39	82	−43	29	
19	Lincoln Moorlands Railway	38	6	7	25	40	96	−56	25	
20	Selby Town	38	3	3	32	26	110	−84	12	Relegated to Division One

Source: fchd
Rules for classification: 1) points; 2) goal difference; 3) number of goals scored.

== Division One ==
Northern Counties East Football League Division One
- Season: 2011–12
- Champions: Handsworth
- Promoted: Glasshoughton Welfare; Worksop Parramore
- Matches: 380
- Goals: 1,469 (3.87 per match)

Division One featured 16 clubs which competed in the previous season, along with four new clubs:

- Albion Sports, promoted from the West Riding County Amateur League
- Dinnington Town, relegated from the Premier Division
- Hallam, relegated from the Premier Division
- Sheffield Parramore, promoted from the Central Midlands League, who also changed name to Worksop Parramore

=== League table ===
Pos	Team	Pld	W	D	L	GF	GA	GD	Pts	Promotion or relegation
1	Handsworth	38	27	1	10	89	40	+49	82	Resigned to the Sheffield and Hallamshire County Senior League
2	Glasshoughton Welfare	38	24	7	7	102	57	+45	79	Promoted to the Premier Division
3	Worksop Parramore	38	24	5	9	95	52	+43	77	Promoted to the Premier Division
4	Albion Sports	38	24	4	10	106	70	+36	76	
5	Pontefract Collieries	38	23	3	12	86	49	+37	72	
6	Eccleshill United	38	20	4	14	83	57	+26	66 (Note: Eccleshill United had 2 points awarded.)	
7	Rossington Main	38	19	7	12	85	57	+28	64	
8	Hemsworth Miners Welfare	38	18	6	14	73	66	+7	60	
9	Dinnington Town	38	18	6	14	68	67	+1	60	
10	AFC Emley	38	17	7	14	83	69	+14	57 (Note: AFC Emley had 1 point deducted.)	
11	Worsbrough Bridge Athletic	38	16	9	13	74	65	+9	57	
12	Louth Town	38	16	7	15	61	64	−3	55	
13	Shirebrook Town	38	14	9	15	75	75	0	51	
14	Hallam	38	15	6	17	66	74	−8	51	
15	Teversal	38	15	6	17	72	84	−12	51	
16	Bottesford Town	38	9	6	23	52	83	−31	33	
17	Askern Villa	38	10	3	25	54	87	−33	33	
18	Grimsby Borough	38	7	5	26	53	109	−56	26	
19	Yorkshire Amateur	38	7	7	24	53	112	−59	25 (Note: Yorkshire Amateur had 3 points deducted.)	
20	Appleby Frodingham	38	2	2	34	39	132	−93	8	

Source: fchd
Rules for classification: 1) points; 2) goal difference; 3) number of goals scored.
