= 1977–78 Yorkshire Football League =

The 1977–78 Yorkshire Football League was the 52nd season in the history of the Yorkshire Football League, a football competition in England.

== Division One ==
Yorkshire Football League Division One
- Season: 1977–78
- Champions: Emley
- Relegated: Denaby United; Farsley Celtic; Leeds & Carnegie Polytechnic; Ossett Albion
- Matches played: 240
- Goals scored: 732 (3.05 per match)

Division One featured 12 clubs which competed in the previous season, along with four new clubs, promoted from Division Two:

- Farsley Celtic
- Frecheville Community Association
- Sheffield
- Tadcaster Albion

=== League table ===
Pos	Team	Pld	W	D	L	GF	GA	GD	Pts	Qualification or relegation
1	Emley	30	20	7	3	63	33	+30	47	
2	Winterton Rangers	30	15	12	3	62	35	+27	42	
3	Thackley	30	13	11	6	41	27	+14	37	
4	North Ferriby United	30	12	11	7	50	40	+10	35	
5	Guiseley	30	13	8	9	59	41	+18	34	
6	Hallam	30	14	6	10	47	42	+5	34	
7	Sheffield	30	12	9	9	42	35	+7	33	
8	Frecheville Community Association	30	10	9	11	41	41	0	29	
9	Tadcaster Albion	30	9	10	11	42	51	−9	28	
10	Bridlington Town	30	11	5	14	41	49	−8	27	
11	Lincoln United	30	8	9	13	42	61	−19	25	
12	Leeds Ashley Road	30	9	6	15	35	45	−10	24	
13	Ossett Albion	30	6	10	14	49	58	−9	22	Relegated to Division Two
14	Leeds & Carnegie Polytechnic	30	9	3	18	38	46	−8	21	Relegated to Division Two
15	Farsley Celtic	30	5	11	14	41	63	−22	21	Relegated to Division Two
16	Denaby United	30	8	5	17	39	65	−26	21	Relegated to Division Two

Source: fchd
Rules for classification: 1) points; 2) goal difference; 3) number of goals scored.
The points system until the 1990–91 season: 2 points for a win, 1 point for a draw and 0 points for losing.

=== Map ===
Location of the clubs in the 1977–78 Yorkshire League Division One on a map of Yorkshire and the Humber

== Division Two ==
Yorkshire Football League Division Two
- Season: 1977–78
- Champions: Kiveton Park
- Promoted: Bentley Victoria Welfare; Kiveton Park; Ossett Town; Scarborough reserves
- Relegated: Collingham; Harrogate Town; Pickering Town
- Matches played: 210
- Goals scored: 628 (2.99 per match)

Division Two featured eight clubs which competed in the previous season, along with seven new clubs.

- Clubs relegated from Division One:
  - Hatfield Main
  - Liversedge
  - Pickering Town
- Clubs promoted from Division Three:
  - Bentley Victoria Welfare
  - Brook Sports
  - Collingham
  - Fryston Colliery Welfare

=== League table ===
Pos	Team	Pld	W	D	L	GF	GA	GD	Pts	Qualification or relegation
1	Kiveton Park	28	17	3	8	52	27	+25	37	Promoted to Division One
2	Ossett Town	28	14	7	7	43	27	+16	35	Promoted to Division One
3	Bentley Victoria Welfare	28	13	8	7	53	34	+19	34	Promoted to Division One
4	Scarborough reserves	28	15	4	9	43	28	+15	34	Promoted to Division One
5	Liversedge	28	12	10	6	41	34	+7	34	
6	Norton Woodseats	28	13	6	9	45	33	+12	32	
7	Maltby Miners Welfare	28	11	9	8	47	33	+14	31	
8	Barton Town	28	13	3	12	43	36	+7	29	
9	Worsbrough Bridge Miners Welfare Athletic	28	10	9	9	45	47	−2	29	
10	Brook Sports	28	11	6	11	46	48	−2	28	
11	Hatfield Main	28	11	4	13	43	47	−4	26	
12	Fryston Colliery Welfare	28	7	8	13	29	45	−16	22	
13	Harrogate Town	28	7	6	15	38	55	−17	20	Relegated to Division Three
14	Pickering Town	28	8	3	17	38	73	−35	19	Relegated to Division Three
15	Collingham	28	2	6	20	22	61	−39	10	Relegated to Division Three

Source: fchd
Rules for classification: 1) points; 2) goal difference; 3) number of goals scored.
The points system until the 1990–91 season: 2 points for a win, 1 point for a draw and 0 points for losing.

=== Map ===
Location of the clubs in the 1977–78 Yorkshire League Division Two on a map of Yorkshire and the Humber

== Division Three ==
Yorkshire Football League Division Three
- Season: 1977–78
- Champions: Yorkshire Amateur
- Promoted: Rawmarsh Welfare; Thorne Colliery; Wombwell Sporting Association; Yorkshire Amateur
- Matches played: 240
- Goals scored: 819 (3.41 per match)

Division Three featured eleven clubs which competed in the previous season, along with five new clubs.

- Clubs relegated from Division Two:
  - Rawmarsh Welfare
  - Selby Town
  - Woolley Miners Welfare
  - Yorkshire Amateur
- Plus:
  - Harworth Colliery Institute, joined from Sheffield Association League

=== League table ===
Pos	Team	Pld	W	D	L	GF	GA	GD	Pts	Qualification or relegation
1	Yorkshire Amateur	30	18	7	5	59	23	+36	43	Promoted to Division Two
2	Wombwell Sporting Association	30	17	7	6	45	28	+17	41	Promoted to Division Two
3	Rawmarsh Welfare	30	16	8	6	66	40	+26	40	Promoted to Division Two
4	Thorne Colliery	30	15	9	6	60	40	+20	39	Promoted to Division Two
5	Sheffield Waterworks	30	15	8	7	52	25	+27	38	
6	Dodworth Miners Welfare	30	13	12	5	71	43	+28	38	
7	York Railway Institute	30	15	7	8	71	41	+30	37	
8	Hall Road Rangers	30	10	11	9	52	47	+5	31	
9	Pilkington Recreation	30	12	6	12	54	47	+7	30	
10	Harworth Colliery Institute	30	12	5	13	53	61	−8	29	
11	Stocksbridge Works	30	13	2	15	42	50	−8	28	
12	BSC Parkgate	30	10	4	16	40	59	−19	24	
13	Selby Town	30	7	8	15	47	60	−13	22	
14	Woolley Miners Welfare	30	7	7	16	45	68	−23	21	
15	St. John's College (York)	30	3	7	20	40	86	−46	13	Resigned
16	Rossington Miners Welfare	30	1	4	25	22	101	−79	6	

Source: fchd
Rules for classification: 1) points; 2) goal difference; 3) number of goals scored.
The points system until the 1990–91 season: 2 points for a win, 1 point for a draw and 0 points for losing.

=== Map ===
St. John's College (York)
Location of the clubs in the 1977–78 Yorkshire League Division Three on a map of Yorkshire and the Humber

== League Cup ==
1977–78 Yorkshire Football League League Cup
Tournament details
- Country: England

=== Final ===
Sheffield	4–1	Maltby Miners Welfare
