= Jack Teasdale =

English footballer (1929–2018)

Personal information
- Full name: John George Teasdale
- Date of birth: 15 March 1929
- Place of birth: Rossington, Doncaster, England
- Date of death: 3 February 2018 (aged 88)
- Place of death: Doncaster, England
- Height: 5 ft 7 in (1.70 m)
- Position: Wing half

Senior career*
Years	Team	Apps	(Gls)
????–1949	Rossington Miners Welfare		
1949–1956	Doncaster Rovers	113	(0)
- * Club domestic league appearances and goals

John George Teasdale (15 March 1929 – 3 February 2018) was a footballer who played as a wing half for his local teams, Rossington Miners Welfare and Doncaster Rovers. He died on 3 February 2018, aged 88.

== Playing career ==
=== Club career ===
He was playing for Rossington when the new manager of Doncaster Rovers at the time, Peter Doherty, signed him in October 1949. Teasdale initially played in the development sides set up by Doherty, joining up with his recent teammate and fellow Rossington native, Brian Makepeace. He gained his debut for the first XI in a 4–1 win at Chesterfield on 7 April 1951 in Division 2. In his 120 league and FA Cup matches for the club, he always played wing half, 79 times on the left and 41 on the right, never scoring.

=== International career ===
In May 1956, Teasdale went on an 18 match FA tour of South Africa and Rhodesia with 17 other players, some of whom were internationals and others international prospects. During the first match of the tour, he suffered a bad knee injury that ended both his tour and his football career.

== In popular culture ==
Teasdale featured in the 1956/57 edition of Charles Buchan's Soccer Gift Book as one of eleven full page hand colored photos.
