= A.F.C. Phoenix =

Association football club in England

Phoenix
- Full name: A.F.C. Phoenix
- Founded: 1917 (as Steel, Peech & Tozer)
- Dissolved: 1995 (reformed 1997)
- Ground: Pavilion Lane, Rotherham
- Chairman: Ian Cocker
- Manager: Darren Newson
- League: Central Midlands Alliance Premier Division North
- 2024–25: Central Midlands Alliance Premier Division North, 15th of 16
Home colours

A.F.C. Phoenix is a football club based in Brinsworth, Rotherham, South Yorkshire, England. They are currently members of the Central Midlands Alliance Premier Division North and play at Pavilion Lane.

== History ==
The club originated as Steel, Peech and Tozer, the works team of the steel making firm. In 1950 they beat Maltby Main to reach the 1st qualifying round of the FA Cup, where they were beaten 0–9 by Norton Woodseats. The club was renamed Phoenix in 1971, by which time they were members of the Sheffield & Hallamshire County Senior League and in 1992 they won the Premier Division title.

In 1995 they merged with fellow S&HCSL outfit Ash House to form Ash House Phoenix, but just two years later the new club dissolved and Phoenix was reformed that year. They won their second S&HCSL title in 1998, but fell into difficulties in 2007, later joining the Central Midlands League.

=== Season-by-season record ===
Season	Division	Level	Position	FA Cup	Notes
1923–24	Sheffield & District Works League Beatty League	-		-	
1924–25	Rotherham Minor League	-		-	
1925–26	Rotherham Association League	-		-	
1926–27	Rotherham Association League	-		-	
1927–28	Rotherham Minor League	-		-	
1928–29	Rotherham Minor League	-		-	
1929–30	Rotherham Junior League	-		-	
1930–31	Rotherham Junior League	-		-	
1931–32	Rotherham & District Works League	-		-	
1932–33	Sheffield Amateur League	-	11th/11	-	
1933–34	Rotherham & District Works League	-		-	
1934–35	Sheffield Amateur League	-	11th/12	-	
1935–36	Sheffield & District Works League Premier League	-	2nd/9	-	
1948–49	Hatchard League	-		1QR	
1949–50	Sheffield Association League	-	11th/16	EPR	
1950–51	Sheffield Association League	-		1QR	
1951–52	Sheffield Association League	-		-	
1952–53	Sheffield Association League	-	18th/18	-	
1953–54	Sheffield Association League	-		-	
1954–55	Sheffield Association League	-	14th/17	-	
1955–56	Sheffield Association League	-		-	
1956–57	Sheffield Association League	-		-	
1957–58	Sheffield Association League	-		-	
1958–59	Sheffield Association League	-		-	
1959–60	Sheffield Association League	-		-	
1960–61	Sheffield Association League	-		-	
1961–62	Sheffield Association League	-		-	
1962–63	Sheffield Association League Division 2	-	5th/13	-	
1963–64	Sheffield Association League Division 2	-	5th/15	-	
1964–65	Sheffield Association League Division 2	-	11th/15	-	
1965–66	Sheffield Association League Division 2	-		-	
1966–67	Sheffield Association League Division 2	-	8th/17	-	
1967–68	Sheffield Association League Division 2	-		-	
1968–69	Sheffield Association League Division 2	-		-	Promoted
1969–70	Sheffield Association League Division 1	-		-	
1970–71	Sheffield Association League Division 1	-		-	
1971–72	Sheffield Association League Division 1	-	12th/15	-	
1972–73	Sheffield Association League Division 1	-		-	Relegated
1973–74	Sheffield Association League Division 2	-		-	
1974–75	Sheffield Association League Division 2	-		-	Promoted
1975–76	Sheffield Association League Division 1	-	9th/16	-	
1976–77	Sheffield Association League Division 1	-		-	
1977–78	Sheffield Association League Division 1	-		-	Relegated
1978–79	Sheffield Association League Division 2	-	5th/15	-	
1979–80	Sheffield Association League Division 2	-		-	Promoted
1980–81	Sheffield Association League Division 1	-		-	Relegated
1981–82	Sheffield Association League Division 2	-		-	
1982–83	Sheffield Association League Division 2	-		-	
1983–84	Sheffield & Hallamshire County Senior League Division 1	-	11th/14	-	
1984–85	Sheffield & Hallamshire County Senior League Division 1	-	12th/14	-	Relegated
1985–86	Sheffield & Hallamshire County Senior League Division 2	-	7th/13	-	
1986–87	Sheffield & Hallamshire County Senior League Division 2	-	4th/13	-	
1987–88	Sheffield & Hallamshire County Senior League Division 2	-	9th/13	-	
1988–89	Sheffield & Hallamshire County Senior League Division 2	-	6th/14	-	
1989–90	Sheffield & Hallamshire County Senior League Division 2	-	2nd/14	-	Promoted
1990–91	Sheffield & Hallamshire County Senior League Division 1	-	3rd/13	-	Promoted
1991–92	Sheffield & Hallamshire County Senior League Premier Division	-	1st/14	-	League champions
1992–93	Sheffield & Hallamshire County Senior League Premier Division	-	8th/14	-	
1993–94	Sheffield & Hallamshire County Senior League Premier Division	-	8th/14	-	
1994–95	Sheffield & Hallamshire County Senior League Premier Division	-	13th/14	-	
Club dissolved (1995) and reformed (1997)
1997–98	Sheffield & Hallamshire County Senior League Premier Division	-	1st/14	-	League champions
1998–99	Sheffield & Hallamshire County Senior League Premier Division	-	2nd/14	-	
1999–00	Sheffield & Hallamshire County Senior League Premier Division	-	2nd/14	-	
2000–01	Sheffield & Hallamshire County Senior League Premier Division	-	6th/14	-	
2001–02	Sheffield & Hallamshire County Senior League Premier Division	-	3rd/14	-	
2002–03	Sheffield & Hallamshire County Senior League Premier Division	-	13th/13	-	
2003–04	Sheffield & Hallamshire County Senior League Premier Division	-	14th/15	-	Relegated
2004–05	Sheffield & Hallamshire County Senior League Division 1	12	13th/14	-	Relegated
2005–06	Sheffield & Hallamshire County Senior League Division 2	13	8th/14	-	
2006–07	Sheffield & Hallamshire County Senior League Division 2	13	Withdrew	-	
2007–08	Central Midlands League Premier Division	12	16th/20	-	
2008–09	Central Midlands League Premier Division	12	11th/15	-	
2009–10	Central Midlands League Premier Division	12	7th/16	-	
2010–11	Central Midlands League Premier Division	12	10th/15	-	
2011–12	Central Midlands League North Division	11	12th/17	-	
2012–13	Central Midlands League North Division	11	7th/17	-	
2013–14	Central Midlands League North Division	11	9th/17	-	
2014–15	Central Midlands League North Division	11	13th/18	-	
2015–16	Central Midlands League North Division	11	3rd/15	-	
2016–17	Central Midlands League North Division	11	12th/16	-	
2017–18	Central Midlands League North Division	11	12th/18	-	
2018–19	Central Midlands League North Division	11	10th/14	-	
2019–20	Central Midlands League North Division	11	-	-	League season abandoned due to COVID-19 pandemic
2020–21	Central Midlands League North Division	11	-	-	League season abandoned due to COVID-19 pandemic
2021–22	Central Midlands League North Division	11	18th/18	-	
2022–23	Central Midlands League North Division	11	15th/15	-	
2023–24	Central Midlands League North Division	11	TBD	-	
Season	Division	Level	Position	FA Cup	Notes
Source: Football Club History Database, Football Club History Database

== Ground ==
The club plays at the Phoenix Sports & Social Club, on Pavilion Lane, Brinsworth, postcode S60 5PA.

== Honours ==
=== League ===
- Sheffield and Hallamshire County Senior League Premier Division
  - Champions: 1991–92, 1997–98

=== Cup ===
- Rotherham Charity Cup
  - Winners: 1962–63, 1996–97, 2009–10
  - Runners-up: 1948–49

== Records ==
- Best FA Cup performance: 1st qualifying round, 1948–49, 1950–51
