= Handsworth Urban District =

Handsworth Urban District could refer to:

- Handsworth Urban District, Staffordshire now part of Birmingham, West Midlands
- Handsworth Urban District, Yorkshire now part of Sheffield
