= Rossington Main F.C. =

Association football club in England

Coordinates: 53°28′53.03″N 1°04′25.91″W

Rossington Main
- Full name: Rossington Main Football Club
- Nickname: The Colliery
- Founded: 1919; 107 years ago (as Rossington Main Colliery)
- Ground: Oxford Street; Rossington; South Yorkshire
- Capacity: 2,000 (250 seats)
- Chairman: Daniel Linstrum
- Manager: Greg Young
- League: Northern Counties East League Premier Division
- 2025–26: Northern Counties East League Premier Division, 14th of 20
Home colours

Rossington Main Football Club is an English football club based in Rossington, Doncaster, South Yorkshire. They play in the Northern Counties East League Premier Division, at level 9 of the English football league system.

== History ==
The club came into existence in 1919 as Rossington Main Colliery, making their FA Cup debut in 1921. They competed in the FA Cup until the Second World War, reaching the 4th qualifying round in 1924, losing 0–3 to Lincoln City.

They played in local leagues such as the Doncaster & District Senior League and Sheffield Association League up to the 1970s (having changed their name to Rossington Miners Welfare in 1948), before entering the Yorkshire League in 1975. Their stay in this league lasted just five seasons, finishing in the lower echelons of Division Three on each occasion.

The club entered the Central Midlands League (CMFL) in 1983 after renaming themselves Rossington Main. They won the Premier Division title in 1985 and were promoted to the Supreme Division a year later. In 1991 they joined the Northern Counties East League (NCEL), entering Division One.

In 1998, the club amalgamated with Rossington F.C., who had been members of the CMFL (although never in the same division as Main). Although officially a merger, Main were the senior partner and their name and league placing was retained.

In 2022, Rossington Main had one of their most successful seasons since going division 1, finishing 5th in the league with 81 points from 40 games. They lost 2–0 in the first round of the playoffs to North Ferriby FC. The next season was their most successful, with the club finishing 3rd in the table and qualifying for the playoff where the Colliery defeated Horbury Town F.C. in the final. Rossington Main was promoted to the Premier Division for the first time in its history after more than 30 years in Division One.

=== Season-by-season record ===
Season	Division	Level	Position	FA Cup	FA Vase	Notes
1919–20	Sheffield Association League	–		–	–	
1920–21	Doncaster & District League	–	3rd/11	–	–	
1921–22	Doncaster & District League; South Yorkshire League	– –		PR	–	
1922–23	Sheffield Association League	–	11th/16	PR	–	
1923–24	Sheffield Association League	–	16th/18	PR	–	
1924–25	Sheffield Association League	–	11th/15	4QR	–	
1925–26	Doncaster & District Senior League	–		2QR	–	
1926–27	Doncaster & District Senior League	–		1QR	–	
1927–28	Doncaster & District Senior League	–		PR	–	
1928–29	Doncaster & District Senior League	–		PR	–	
1929–30	Doncaster & District Senior League	–		PR	–	
1930–31	Doncaster & District Senior League	–		PR	–	
1931–32	Sheffield Association League	–	12th/12	PR	–	
1932–33	Sheffield Association League	–	9th/12	PR	–	
1933–34	Sheffield Association League	–	10th/16	1QR	–	
1934–35	Sheffield Association League	–	3rd/12	EPR	–	
1935–36	Sheffield Association League	–	6th/12	EPR	–	
1936–37	Sheffield Association League	–	10th/15	EPR	–	
1937–38	Sheffield Association League	–	12th/17	PR	–	
1938–39	Sheffield Association League	–		EPR	–	
1938–39	Sheffield Association League	–		EPR	–	
1939–40	Doncaster & District Senior League	–		–	–	
1940–41	Doncaster & District Senior League	–		–	–	
1941–42	Club did not enter any competitions due to World War II					
1942–43	Club did not enter any competitions due to World War II					
1943–44	Club did not enter any competitions due to World War II					
1944–45	Club did not enter any competitions due to World War II					
1945–46	Club did not enter any competitions due to World War II					
1946–47	Club did not enter any competitions due to World War II					
1947–48	Doncaster & District Senior League	–	1st	–	–	League champions
1948–49	Doncaster & District Senior League	–		–	–	
1949–50	Club did not enter any competitions					
1950–51	Doncaster & District Senior League Division One	–		–	–	
1951–52	Club did not enter any competitions					
1952–53	Doncaster & District Senior League Division One	–		–	–	
1953–54	Doncaster & District Senior League Division One	–		-	–	
1954–55	Doncaster & District Senior League Division One	–		–	–	
1955–56	Doncaster & District Senior League Division One	–		–	–	
1956–57	Doncaster & District Senior League Division One	–		–	–	
1957–58	Doncaster & District Senior League Division One	–		–	–	
1958–59	Doncaster & District Senior League Division One	–	7/13	-	–	
1959–60	Doncaster & District Senior League Division One	–	10/13	-	–	Relegated
1960–61	Doncaster & District Senior League Division Two	–	6th/13	-	–	
1961–62	Doncaster & District Senior League Division Two	–		-	–	
1962–63	Doncaster & District Senior League Division Two	–	8th/11	-	–	
1963–64	Doncaster & District Senior League Division Two	–	2nd/11	-	–	Promoted
1964–65	Doncaster & District Senior League Division One	–	10/12	-	–	
1965–66	Doncaster & District Senior League Division One	–	9/12	-	–	
1966–67	Doncaster & District Senior League Premier Division	–	12/15	-	–	Relegated
1967–68	Doncaster & District Senior League Division One	–	8th/12	-	–	
1968–69	Doncaster & District Senior League Division One	–		-	–	Promoted
1969–70	Doncaster & District Senior League Premier Division	–		-	–	
1970–71	Doncaster & District Senior League Premier Division	–		-	–	
1971–72	Doncaster & District Senior League Premier Division	–		-	–	
1972–73	Doncaster & District Senior League Premier Division	–		-	–	
1973–74	Doncaster & District Senior League Premier Division	–		-	–	
1974–75	Doncaster & District Senior League Premier Division	–		-	–	
1975–76	Yorkshire League Division Three	–	14/16	–	–	
1976–77	Yorkshire League Division Three	–	12/16	–	–	
1977–78	Yorkshire League Division Three	–	16/16	–	–	
1978–79	Yorkshire League Division Three	–	15/15	–	–	
1979–80	Yorkshire League Division Three	–	13/14	–	–	
1980–81	Doncaster & District Senior League Division One	–	4/16	–	–	
1981–82	Doncaster & District Senior League Division One	–	4/14	–	–	
1982–83	Doncaster & District Senior League Division One	–	3rd/14	–	–	
1983–84	Central Midlands League Division One	–	3/16	–	–	Promoted
1984–85	Central Midlands League Premier Division	–	1/16	–	–	League champions
1985–86	Central Midlands League Premier Division	–	5/16	–	EPR	Promoted
1986–87	Central Midlands League Supreme Division	–	13/13	–	EPR	
1987–88	Central Midlands League Supreme Division	–	13/17	–	PR	
1988–89	Central Midlands League Supreme Division	–	16/17	–	2R	
1989–90	Central Midlands League Supreme Division	–	19/20	–	EPR	
1990–91	Central Midlands League Supreme Division	–	8/17	–	PR	Transferred
1991–92	Northern Counties East League Division One	–	7th/16	–	EPR	
1992–93	Northern Counties East League Division One	–	7th/14	–	EPR	
1993–94	Northern Counties East League Division One	–	7th/15	PR	PR	
1994–95	Northern Counties East League Division One	–	11th/16	PR	PR	
1995–96	Northern Counties East League Division One	–	10th/16	PR	1QR	
1996–97	Northern Counties East League Division One	–	9th/15	1QR	2QR	
1997–98	Northern Counties East League Division One	–	9th/15	–	1R	
1998–99	Northern Counties East League Division One	–	12th/13	1QR	1R	
1999–00	Northern Counties East League Division One	–	15th/16	PR	1R	
2000–01	Northern Counties East League Division One	–	15th/16	PR	2QR	
2001–02	Northern Counties East League Division One	–	8th/16	PR	1R	
2002–03	Northern Counties East League Division One	–	12th/17	2QR	2QR	
2003–04	Northern Counties East League Division One	–	12th/18	PR	1QR	
2004–05	Northern Counties East League Division One	10	14th/16	EPR	2QR	
2005–06	Northern Counties East League Division One	10	13th/16	EPR	2QR	
2006–07	Northern Counties East League Division One	10	17th/17	EPR	2QR	
2007–08	Northern Counties East League Division One	10	16th/17	EPR	1QR	
2008–09	Northern Counties East League Division One	10	11th/19	EPR	1R	
2009–10	Northern Counties East League Division One	10	10th/18	PR	1R	
2010–11	Northern Counties East League Division One	10	14th/20	EPR	2QR	
2011–12	Northern Counties East League Division One	10	7th/20	EPR	2QR	
2012–13	Northern Counties East League Division One	10	18th/22	EPR	1QR	
2013–14	Northern Counties East League Division One	10	13th/22	–	2QR	
2014–15	Northern Counties East League Division One	10	15th/22	–	1QR	
2015–16	Northern Counties East League Division One	10	20th/21	–	2QR	
2016–17	Northern Counties East League Division One	10	15th/22	–	2QR	
2017–18	Northern Counties East League Division One	10	13th/22	–	1QR	
2018–19	Northern Counties East League Division One	10	14th/20	–	2QR	
2019–20	Northern Counties East League Division One	10	–	–	2QR	League season abandoned due to COVID-19 pandemic
2020–21	Northern Counties East League Division One	10	–	–	1QR	League season abandoned due to COVID-19 pandemic
2021–22	Northern Counties East League Division One	10	5/21	–	2QR	
2022–23	Northern Counties East League Division One	10	3/20	–	2QR	Promoted (won play-off)
2023–24	Northern Counties East League Premier Division	9	4th/20	PR	2QR	
2024–25	Northern Counties East League Premier Division	9	13th/20	EPR	1QR	
2025–26	Northern Counties East League Premier Division	9	14th/20	1QR	3R	
Season	Division	Level	Position	FA Cup	FA Vase	Notes
Source: Football Club History Database

=== Notable former players ===
Players that have played in the Football League either before or after playing for Rossington Main –

- Jamie Green
- Ross Hannah
- Greg Young
- Cody Prior
- Ken Hardwick
- Gary Jones
- Joe Lievesley
- Leslie Lievesley
- Brian Makepeace

- George Shaw
- Wilf Shaw
- Ron Spence
- Zephaniah Thomas
- Jack Teasdale
- Bobby Faulkner
- Lewis Graham

Players that have played in the UEFA club competitions either before or after playing for Rossington Main.

- Manasse Kianga

== Ground ==
The club plays at Oxford Street in Rossington, postcode DN11 0TD.

== Honours ==
=== League ===
- Central Midlands League Premier Division
  - Champions: 1984–85
  - Promoted: 1985–86
- Doncaster & District Senior League
  - Champions: 1944–45
- Northern Counties East League Division One
  - Promoted: 2022–23

=== Cup ===
- Central Midlands Football League Cup
  - Winners 1983–84
- Doncaster & District Senior League Cup
  - Winners: 1944–45
- Doncaster & District Senior League Premier Division Cup
  - Winners: 1973–74

== Records ==
- Best League performance: 4th in Northern Counties East League Premier Division, 2023-24
- Best FA Cup performance: 4th qualifying round, 1924–25
- Best FA Vase performance: 3rd round, 2025–26
- Record attendance: 1,697 vs. Doncaster Rovers, pre-season friendly, 2023–24
