= Dodworth Miners Welfare F.C. =

Association football club in England

Dodworth Miners Welfare
- Full name: Dodworth Miners Welfare Football Club
- Ground: Miners Welfare Ground, Dodworth
- Manager: Paul Jackson / Jonas Hendley
- League: Sheffield & Hallamshire County Senior League Premier Division
- 2024–25: Sheffield & Hallamshire County Senior League Premier Division, 5th of 14
Home colours

Dodworth Miners Welfare Football Club is a football club based in Dodworth, Barnsley, South Yorkshire, England. They are currently members of the Sheffield & Hallamshire County Senior League Premier Division and play at the Miners Welfare Ground.

== History ==
The club spent three separate spells in the Yorkshire Football League, with a highest finish of 7th in Division Two, in their first season in the competition in 1959.

=== Season-by-season record ===
Season	Division	Level	Position	Notes
1954–55	Barnsley Association League			
1955–56	Barnsley Association League			
1956–57	Barnsley Association League			
1957–58	Barnsley Association League			
1958–59	Yorkshire League Division Two		7th/13	
1959–60	Yorkshire League Division Two		14th/15	
1960–61	Yorkshire League Division Two		15th/19	
1962–63	Yorkshire League Division Two		15th/15	
1963–64	Yorkshire League Division Two		14th/15	
1964–65	Barnsley Junior League			
1965–66	Barnsley Association League			
1966–67	Barnsley Association League			
1967–68	Barnsley Association League			
1968–69	Barnsley Association League			
1969–70	Barnsley Association League Division One			League champions (won play-off)
1970–71	Barnsley Association League Division One			
1971–72	Barnsley Association League Division One			
1972–73	Barnsley Association League Division One		12th/12	
1973–74	Barnsley Association League Premier Division			
1974–75	Barnsley Association League Premier Division			
1975–76	Yorkshire League Division Three		10th/16	
1976–77	Yorkshire League Division Three		8th/16	
1977–78	Yorkshire League Division Three		6th/16	
1978–79	Yorkshire League Division Three		8th/15	
1979–80	Barnsley Nelson League Division Three		5th/11	Promoted
1980–81	Barnsley Nelson League Division Two		5th/9	Promoted
1981–82	Barnsley Nelson League Division One		6th/10	
1982–83	Barnsley Junior League Division Two		6th/13	
1983–84	Barnsley Junior League Division Two		6th/12	
1984–85	Barnsley Junior League Division Two		7th/9	
1985–86	Barnsley Junior League Division Two		6th/10	
1986–87	Barnsley Junior League Division Two		4th/13	
1987–88	Barnsley Junior League Division Two		3rd/10	
1988–89	Barnsley Junior League Division Two		8th/9	
1989–90	Barnsley Junior League Division Two		7th/11	Promoted
1990–91	Barnsley Junior League Division One		6th/10	
1991–92	Barnsley Junior League Division One		4th/9	
1992–93	Barnsley Junior League Division One		3rd/9	
1993–94	Barnsley Junior League Division One			
1994–95	Barnsley Association League Division One		1st/11	League champions, promoted
1995–96	Barnsley Association League Premier Division		5th/9	
1996–97	Barnsley Association League Premier Division			
1997–98	Barnsley Association League Premier Division		11th/11	
1998–99	Barnsley Association League Premier Division		4th/13	
1999–00	Barnsley Association League Premier Division			
2000–01	Barnsley Association League Premier Division		7th/9	
2001–02	Barnsley Association League Premier Division		Withdrew	
2003–04	Sheffield & Hallamshire County Senior League Division Two		5th/15	
2004–05	Sheffield & Hallamshire County Senior League Division Two	13	1st/12	League champions, promoted
2005–06	Sheffield & Hallamshire County Senior League Division One	12	12th/13	
2006–07	Sheffield & Hallamshire County Senior League Division One	12	8th/14	
2007–08	Wakefield & District League Division Two	16	2nd/12	Promoted
2008–09	Wakefield & District League Division One	15	2nd/13	Promoted
2009–10	Wakefield & District League Premier Division	14	8th/11	
2010–11	Wakefield & District League Premier Division	14	1st/11	League champions
2011–12	Wakefield & District League Premier Division	14	Withdrew	
2012–13	South Yorkshire Amateur League Division One	15	1st/7	League champions
Club dissolved (2013) and reformed (2016)
2016–17	Sheffield & Hallamshire County Senior League Division Two North	13	1st/11	League champions, promoted
2017–18	Sheffield & Hallamshire County Senior League Division One	12	1st/12	League champions, promoted
2018–19	Sheffield & Hallamshire County Senior League Premier Division	11	2nd/15	
2019–20	Sheffield & Hallamshire County Senior League Premier Division	11	-	League season abandoned owing to COVID-19 pandemic
2020–21	Sheffield & Hallamshire County Senior League Premier Division	11	-	League season abandoned owing to COVID-19 pandemic
2021–22	Sheffield & Hallamshire County Senior League Premier Division	11	7th/18	
2022–23	Sheffield & Hallamshire County Senior League Premier Division	11	7th/15	
2023–24	Sheffield & Hallamshire County Senior League Premier Division	11	2nd/14	
2024–25	Sheffield & Hallamshire County Senior League Premier Division	11	5th/14	
Season	Division	Level	Position	Notes
Source: Football Club History Database

== Ground ==
The club plays at the Dodworth Miners Welfare Ground, on High Street, Dodworth, postcode S75 3RF.

== Honours ==
=== League ===
- Sheffield & Hallamshire County Senior Football League Division One
  - Champions: 2017–18
- Sheffield & Hallamshire County Senior Football League Division Two
  - Champions: 2004–05, 2016-17 (Division Two North)

=== Cup ===
- Sheffield & Hallamshire County FA Association Cup
  - Winners: 2016-17
