= Steve Fleetwood =

English footballer and manager

Personal information
- Full name: Steven Robert Fleetwood
- Date of birth: 27 February 1962 (age 64)
- Place of birth: Sheffield, England
- Height: 5 ft 10 in (1.78 m)
- Position: Midfielder

Senior career*
Years	Team	Apps	(Gls)
1987	Rotherham United	1	(0)
1987–?	Maltby Miners Welfare	?	(?)
	Kiveton Park	?	(?)

Managerial career
- 1998–1999: Maltby Main
- * Club domestic league appearances and goals

Steven Robert Fleetwood (born 27 February 1962 in Sheffield, England) is an English former footballer and manager.

== Career ==
Fleetwood started his career with Rotherham United in February 1980 on professional terms after being an apprentice at the club. He played under Ian Porterfield and was his first professional signing as a manager. He played as a professional until 1984 when he broke his leg which led to his retirement. He made another appearance in 1987 against Wigan Athletic but due to previous injury could not sign another professional contract, having failed the medical. He made one league appearance before going on to play for Maltby Miners Welfare.

He was appointed as manager of Maltby before the start of the 1998–99 season, but resigned at the end of the season due to work commitments.
