= Thomas Dunn (mayor) =

Thomas Dunn (1801–8 January 1871) was a British politician. He was the second mayor of Sheffield.

== Biography ==
Dunn was born in Handsworth in 1801, and was educated at Sheffield Grammar School. He initially followed his father in manufacturing table knives, but hoped to become a barrister. In 1820 he became a partner in the Sheffield Coal Company, and thereafter devoted himself to the business. He married Eliza Horncastle, and the two lived in Upperthorpe, where he became overseer of the township of Nether Hallam. He later moved to Richmond Hill House.

At the 1832 UK general election, Dunn was a leading supporter of Samuel Bailey's unsuccessful candidacy in Sheffield for the Whigs. In 1843, he was an asignee charged with winding up the failed Sheffield Old Bank. The same year, he was elected as a member of the new Sheffield Town Council, and in 1844 he was elected as the town's second mayor. In 1848, he was appointed as one of the town's first magistrates, and in 1856 he was elected to the Sheffield Town Trust.

Dunn was invited to stand in Sheffield at the 1865 UK general election, but he refused as he believed that he was too old. At the 1868 UK general election, he chaired A. J. Mundella's successful campaign.

== Family ==
Dunn was the first cousin of the first mayor of Sheffield, William Jeffcock, and was known for his liberal views.
