= Ron Spence =

English footballer

Personal information
- Full name: Ronald Spence
- Date of birth: 7 January 1927
- Place of birth: Spennymoor, England
- Date of death: 24 April 1996 (aged 69)
- Place of death: Doncaster, England
- Height: 5 ft 8 in (1.73 m)
- Position: Wing half

Senior career*
Years	Team	Apps	(Gls)
	Tudhoe Colliery	?	(?)
?–1948	Rossington Colliery	?	(?)
1948–1958	York City	260	(25)
1960–?	Scarborough	?	(?)
	Goole Town	?	(?)
Total		260	(25)
- * Club domestic league appearances and goals

Ronald Spence (7 January 1927 – 24 April 1996) was an English footballer who played as a wing half.

== Career ==
Born in Spennymoor, County Durham, Spence played for Tudhoe Colliery and Rossington Colliery before signing for York City in March 1948. He was a part of the team which played in the FA Cup semi-final in 1955. He joined non-League side Scarborough in June 1960, playing 42 appearances and scoring 10 goals in all competitions before playing for Goole Town. He returned to York as part-time trainer in July 1964, before taking the position full-time in November 1966. He then worked as physiotherapist and juniors' coach at the club from August 1972 to September 1975. Spence died in Doncaster Royal Infirmary at the age of 69 on 24 April 1996.
