= Dinnington Town F.C. =

Association football club in England

Coordinates: 53°22′16.24″N 1°12′26.63″W

Dinnington Town
- Full name: Dinnington Town Football Club
- Nickname: Dinno
- Founded: 2000
- Ground: Blackout13.com Arena
- Capacity: 2,500 100 covered seating
- Chairman: Rob Cully
- Manager: Gary Eades
- League: Central Midlands Alliance Premier Division North
- 2025–26: Central Midlands Alliance Premier Division North, 2nd of 16
- Website: www.dinningtontown.co.uk
Home colours	Away colours

Dinnington Town Football Club is a football club based in Dinnington, Rotherham, South Yorkshire, England.

== History ==
The club was formed in 2000, joining the Premier Division of the Central Midlands League (CMFL). In 2001–02 they finished third and were promoted to the Supreme Division. They won the CMFL League Cup in 2002–03 and finished as league runners-up in 2003–04 and 2004–05. After a third consecutive second-placed finish in 2005–06 (a season which also saw them win the League Cup again) they were promoted to Division One of the Northern Counties East League (NCEL). In 2007–08 they reached the 3rd qualifying round in their debut FA Cup campaign, and won promotion to the NCEL Premier Division after winning the Division One title. After winning the League Cup in 2009–10, they were relegated back to Division One at the end of the 2010–11 season.

Close to the end of the 2013–14 season, the club announced to resign from the league, subsequently to rejoin the Central Midlands League for the 2014–15 season, entering the league's North Division.

=== Season-by-season record ===
Season	Division	Level	Position	FA Cup	FA Vase	Notes
2000–01	Central Midlands League Premier Division	-	6th/17	-	-	
2001–02	Central Midlands League Premier Division	-	3rd/20	-	-	Promoted
2002–03	Central Midlands League Supreme Division	-	6th/20	-	-	
2003–04	Central Midlands League Supreme Division	-	2nd/19	-	-	
2004–05	Central Midlands League Supreme Division	11	2nd/22	-	-	
2005–06	Central Midlands League Supreme Division	11	2nd/21	-	-	Promoted
2006–07	Northern Counties East League Division One	10	9th/17	-	1R	
2007–08	Northern Counties East League Division One	10	1st/17	3QR	2QR	League champions, promoted
2008–09	Northern Counties East League Premier Division	9	10th/23	EPR	2QR	
2009–10	Northern Counties East League Premier Division	9	12th/20	EPR	1R	
2010–11	Northern Counties East League Premier Division	9	20th/20	EPR	2QR	Relegated
2011–12	Northern Counties East League Division One	10	9th/20	EPR	1R	
2012–13	Northern Counties East League Division One	10	19th/22	EPR	1QR	
2013–14	Northern Counties East League Division One	10	18th/22	-	2QR	Relegated
2014–15	Central Midlands League North Division	11	16th/18	-	-	
2015–16	Central Midlands League North Division	11	14th/15	-	2QR	
2016–17	Central Midlands League North Division	11	14th/16	-	-	
2017–18	Central Midlands League North Division	11	8th/18	-	-	
2018–19	Central Midlands League North Division	11	11th/14	-	-	
2019–20	Central Midlands League North Division	11	-	-	-	League season abandoned due to COVID-19 pandemic
2020–21	Central Midlands League North Division	11	-	-	-	League season abandoned due to COVID-19 pandemic
2021–22	Central Midlands League North Division	11	7th/18	-	-	
2022–23	Central Midlands League North Division	11	7th/15	-	-	
2023–24	Central Midlands Alliance League North Division	11	3rd/16	-	-	
2024–25	Central Midlands Alliance League North Division	11	2nd/16	-	-	
Season	Division	Level	Position	FA Cup	FA Vase	Notes
Source: Football Club History Database Central Midlands League | The FA Full Time

== Ground ==
The club plays its home fixtures at Phoenix Park, based at the Dinnington Resource Centre on Laughton Road, Dinnington. The postcode is S25 2PP.

=== Gallery ===
A series of images taken during the Dinnington Town vs. Sheffield Wednesday XI friendly match, 30 July 2008.

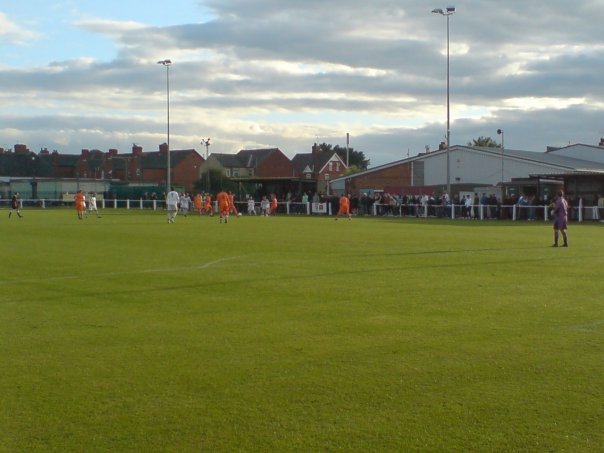

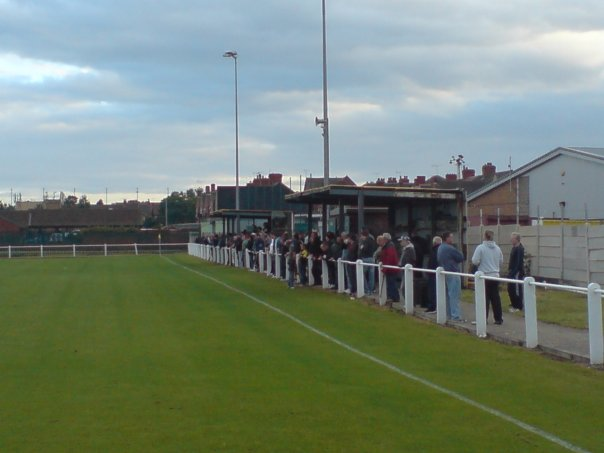

== Honours ==
=== League ===
- Northern Counties East League Division One
  - Promoted: 2007–08 (champions)
- Central Midlands League Supreme Division
  - Promoted: 2005–06
- Central Midlands League Premier Division
  - Promoted: 2001–02

=== Cup ===
- Northern Counties East League Cup
  - Winners: 2009–10
- Central Midlands League Cup
  - Winners: 2002–03, 2005–06, 2024-25, 2025-26

- Abacus Lightning Floodlit Cup
  - Winners: 2025-26

== Records ==
- Best League performance: 8th, Northern Counties East League Premier Division, 2008–09
- Best FA Cup performance: 3rd qualifying round, 2007–08
- Best FA Vase performance: 1st round, 2006–07, 2009–10, 2011–12
- Record attendance: 622 vs. Maltby Main, FA Cup, 2007–08
