= Liversedge F.C. =

Association football club in England

Coordinates: 53°43′03.53″N 1°42′42.39″W

Liversedge
- Full name: Liversedge Football Club
- Nickname: Sedge
- Founded: 1910; 116 years ago
- Ground: Clayborn, Cleckheaton; West Yorkshire
- Capacity: 2,000
- Chairman: Bethany Osborne
- Manager: Danny Forrest
- League: Northern Premier League Division One East
- 2025–26: Northern Counties East League Premier Division, 1st of 20 (promoted)
- Website: liversedgefc.co.uk
Home colours	Away colours

Liversedge F.C. is a football club based in Cleckheaton, England, on the border with Hightown in Liversedge. They are currently members of the Northern Premier League Division One East.

Liversedge play their home games at Clayborn, which features a clubhouse to the top west corner of the ground, covered seating at the North, and a small covered-terracing stand to the West behind the goal. In 2017, Liversedge secured much-needed investment from Trevor Best, Managing Director and Founder of Corpad. Best managed Liversedge in the 1990s, and was chairman as they secured two successive promotions.

== Selected facts about Sedge ==
In the 2004–05 season Liversedge reached the 4th qualifying round of the FA Cup and took Coalville Town to a replay. The draw saw them in the televised draw for the first round proper of the Cup, the stage where the Football League clubs join. Coalville won the replay 2–0 to face Wycombe Wanderers. That season saw Sedge achieve their highest finish in the NCEL, second-placed behind Buxton. Promotion was not granted as the ground was not up to the required standard at that time.

Prior to the 2004–05 season the ground had a large slope from the north to the south. The pitch was dug up in closed season of 2005, and the surface was rebuilt from scratch to make a new, flat field. Liversedge had to play their first few games away for the 2005–06 season while the turf bedded in. The money made from the previous years FA Cup run, enabled them to facilitate this.

On 25 July 2010, Sedge played a match to mark the club's centenary against a Legends XI including Peter Beagrie and former Huddersfield Town player Simon Trevitt. The Legends won 2–1 with both their goals being scored by Chris Freestone.

Following a couple of seasons curtailed dramatically by the coronavirus pandemic, Liversedge were promoted to the Northern Premier League East due to having finished both the 2019–20 and 2020–21 seasons in the top three of the table (based on a table using a Points Per Games calculation).

For many years Sedge played in a sky blue home shirt but in 2021–22 they started to play in shirts with blue and white stripes on the front and plain white on the back.

At the end of the 2020/2021 season the highest ever polling result for the league goal of the season was when liversedge forward jack hurrell buried the ball into the top corner from the 35yrd mark after a free kick.

In October 2021, Liversedge F.C. went viral on Twitter because their striker Joe Walton had to go in goal in the second round of the FA Trophy against Clitheroe FC following a red card to the Sedge keeper. He made a string of fine saves to get ten-man Sedge to a penalty shootout, which they then won with Walton saving two and scoring one himself as Sedge went through 10–9 on penalties. Footage of this was retweeted on Twitter and Walton got interviewed on the national radio station Talksport. He was originally a central defender at Sedge before he started playing upfront, and had done the same thing in a cup tie at Barton Town in a previous season. Sedge had been playing Association Football for more than a hundred years before they were relegated for the first time in 2022–23.

The closest team, in the Northern Premier League, to Liversedge F.C. is Brighouse Town. Clashes with better-supported Ossett United are regularly held on a Friday night, with requests to arrive early before the match, making it one of the big derby matches in the league.

A record crowd of 1,559 saw Liversedge beat Ossett at Clayborn in their league fixture on 21 January 2022.

The 2025–26 season saw Liversedge immediately promoted back to step 4 as champions following their relegation to the Northern Counties East Premier Division the previous season. 'Sedge also won the Northern Counties East League League Cup Final with a convincing 7-1 win over Rossington Main at the Attis Arena, Scunthorpe.

== Records ==
- Best FA Cup performance: Fourth qualifying round, 2004–05 (replay)
- Best FA Trophy performance: Second round, 2021–22
- Best FA Vase performance: Fourth round, 2020–21

== Honours ==
- Northern Premier League
  - Division One East champions: 2021–22
- Northern Counties East Football League
  - Premier Division champions : 2025–26
  - President's Cup : 2007–08
  - League Cup winners : 2005–06,2025-26
- West Riding County Cup
  - winners : 1989–90, 2021–22

== League history ==
Years	League
1919–1922	Bradford League
1922–1927	West Riding County Amateur
1947–1949	Spen Valley and District League
1949–1972	West Riding County Amateur
1972–1982	Yorkshire League
1982–2021	Northern Counties East Football League Premier Division
2021–2022	Northern Premier League East Division
2022–2023	Northern Premier League Premier Division
2023–2025	Northern Premier League East Division
2025–2026	Northern Counties East Football League Premier Division
2026–	Northern Premier League East Division

== Seasons ==
Season	∆	League	Division	Pos	P	W	D	L	F	A	GD	Pts	F.A. Cup	F.A. Trophy	F.A. Vase	W.R. County Cup	Notes
1972–73	12	YL	D3	2	30	18	4	8	63	35	+28	40					Promoted to Division Two
1973–74	11	YL	D2	5	30	15	7	8	45	33	+12	37					
1974–75	11	YL	D2	5	28	14	5	9	56	32	+24	33			2R		
1975–76	11	YL	D2	3	28	14	10	4	47	25	+22	38			3R		Promoted to Division One
1976–77	10	YL	D1	14	30	7	6	17	37	57	−20	20			PRE		Joined Division Two
1977–78	11	YL	D2	5	28	12	10	6	41	34	+7	34					
1978–79	11	YL	D2	4	30	13	9	8	39	33	+6	35					Promoted to Division One
1979–80	10	YL	D1	9	30	10	9	11	34	33	+1	29					
1980–81	10	YL	D1	10	30	11	7	12	35	49	−14	29					
1981–82	10	YL	D1	15	30	6	5	19	24	52	−28	17					Joined Northern Counties East League as Founding member
1982–83	10	NCEL	D1(N)	8	26	8	9	9	35	35	+0	25				3R	
1983–84	10	NCEL	D1(N)	13	26	5	7	14	29	53	−24	17				1R	
1984–85	10	NCEL	D1(N)	8	32	14	6	12	55	50	+5	48			EP	3R	Placed in Division Two in re-organisation
1985–86	11	NCEL	D2	10	30	11	5	14	46	56	−10	38			1R	2R	
1986–87	11	NCEL	D2	11	34	10	13	11	40	45	−5	43			PRE	2R	
1987–88	11	NCEL	D2	6	28	13	5	10	51	40	+11	44			PRE	1R	
1988–89	11	NCEL	D2	2	26	16	4	6	52	24	+28	52			PRE	1R	Promoted to Division One
1989–90	10	NCEL	D1	2	28	17	3	8	57	29	+28	54			EP	W	Runner-up on goal difference
1990–91	10	NCEL	D1	3	24	15	2	7	61	35	+26	47			PRE	3R	Promoted to Premier Division
1991–92	9	NCEL	PD	14	36	11	8	17	54	72	−18	41	1Q		2R	2R	
1992–93	9	NCEL	PD	14	38	12	8	18	56	77	−21	44	PRE		EP	SF	
1993–94	9	NCEL	PD	11	38	17	4	17	63	65	−2	55	2Q		2R	2R	
1994–95	9	NCEL	PD	19	38	7	8	23	48	81	−33	29	PRE		PRE	2R	
1995–96	9	NCEL	PD	9	38	16	7	15	52	49	+3	55	PRE		2Q	1R	
1996–97	9	NCEL	PD	20	38	5	9	24	40	87	−47	24	PRE		1Q	2R	
1997–98	9	NCEL	PD	18	38	7	9	22	41	88	−47	30	2Q		2Q	F	
1998–99	9	NCEL	PD	6	38	21	4	13	87	63	+24	67	1Q		2R	SF	
1999–2000	9	NCEL	PD	4	38	20	5	13	76	45	+31	65	2Q		2Q	2R	
2000–01	9	NCEL	PD	15	38	9	13	16	50	63	−13	40	1Q		1R	2R	
2001–02	9	NCEL	PD	11	38	14	6	18	59	66	−7	48	2Q		2Q	SF	
2002–03	9	NCEL	PD	9	38	16	6	16	59	65	−6	54	PRE		1R	3R	
2003–04	9	NCEL	PD	9	38	17	8	13	72	58	+14	59	1Q		2R	2R	
2004–05	9	NCEL	PD	6	38	17	10	11	74	62	+12	61	4Q		2Q	1R	
2005–06	9	NCEL	PD	2	38	25	5	8	106	49	+57	80	EP		3R	2R	
2006–07	9	NCEL	PD	12	38	13	10	15	58	60	−2	49	PRE		2R	2R	
2007–08	9	NCEL	PD	4	38	20	8	10	73	41	+32	68	2Q		2Q	2R	
2008–09	9	NCEL	PD	14	38	14	7	17	60	64	−4	46	EP		1R	2R	Three points deducted
2009–10	9	NCEL	PD	9	38	17	5	16	89	83	+6	56	EP		1R	QF	
2010–11	9	NCEL	PD	17	38	7	12	19	52	76	−24	32	EP		2Q	2R	One point deducted
2011–12	9	NCEL	PD	14	38	12	5	21	62	80	−18	41	PRE		2Q	2R	
2012–13	9	NCEL	PD	15	42	11	12	19	68	81	−13	45	EP		2Q	2R	
2013–14	9	NCEL	PD	20	44	10	6	28	58	115	−57	36	EP		1R	2R	
2014–15	9	NCEL	PD	18	40	9	7	24	46	93	−47	34	EP		2Q	2R	
2015–16	9	NCEL	PD	14	42	13	9	20	61	93	−32	48	EP		1Q	2R	
2016–17	9	NCEL	PD	11	42	17	8	17	99	73	+26	59	EP		2Q	1R	
2017–18	9	NCEL	PD	11	42	15	12	15	96	93	+3	57	EP		1R	1R	
2018–19	9	NCEL	PD	13	38	15	3	20	56	80	−24	48	PRE		1Q	2R	
2019–20	9	NCEL	PD	2	24	16	5	3	80	42	+38	53	1Q		2Q	1R	
2020–21	9	NCEL	PD	3	7	7	0	0	25	3	+22	21	EP		4R		Joined Northern Premier League
2021–22	8	NPL	D1E	1	36	29	6	1	98	22	+76	93	1Q	2R		W	Promoted to Premier Division
2022–23	7	NPL	PD	21	42	11	7	24	48	86	-38	40	2Q	1Q			Relegation to the Division One East
2023–24	8	NPL	D1E	10	38	15	6	17	53	46	+7	51	P	1Q			
2024–25	8	NPL	D1E	21	42	7	13	22	49	69	-20	34	EP	1Q			Relegated to the Northern Counties East League
2025–26	9	NCEL	PD	1	38	27	8	3	85	29	+56	89	EP		2R		Promoted to the Division One East
2026–27	8	NPL	D1E														

== Gallery ==
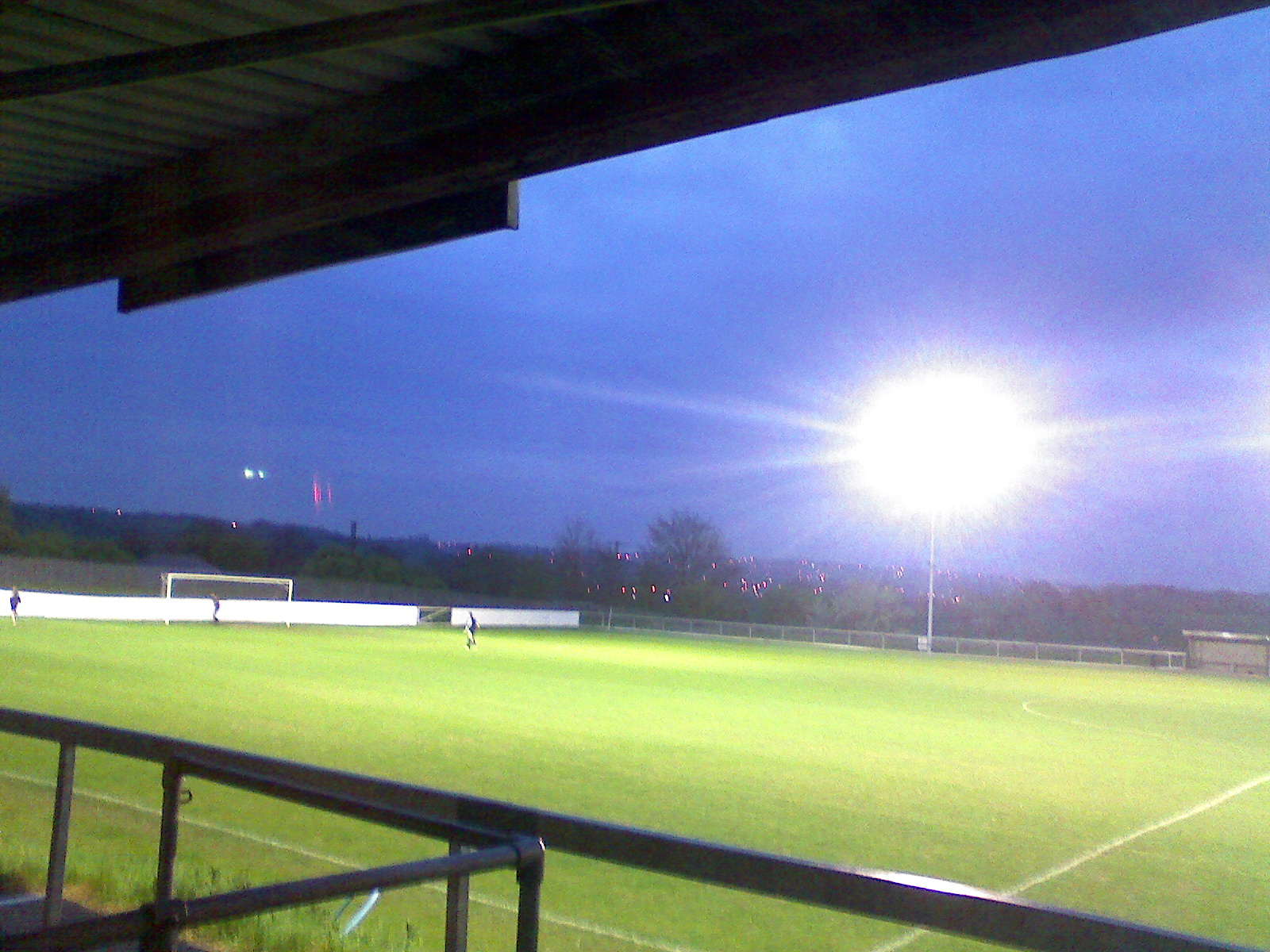
View from the seated stand with the floodlights on.

View of the seated stand taken from the car park

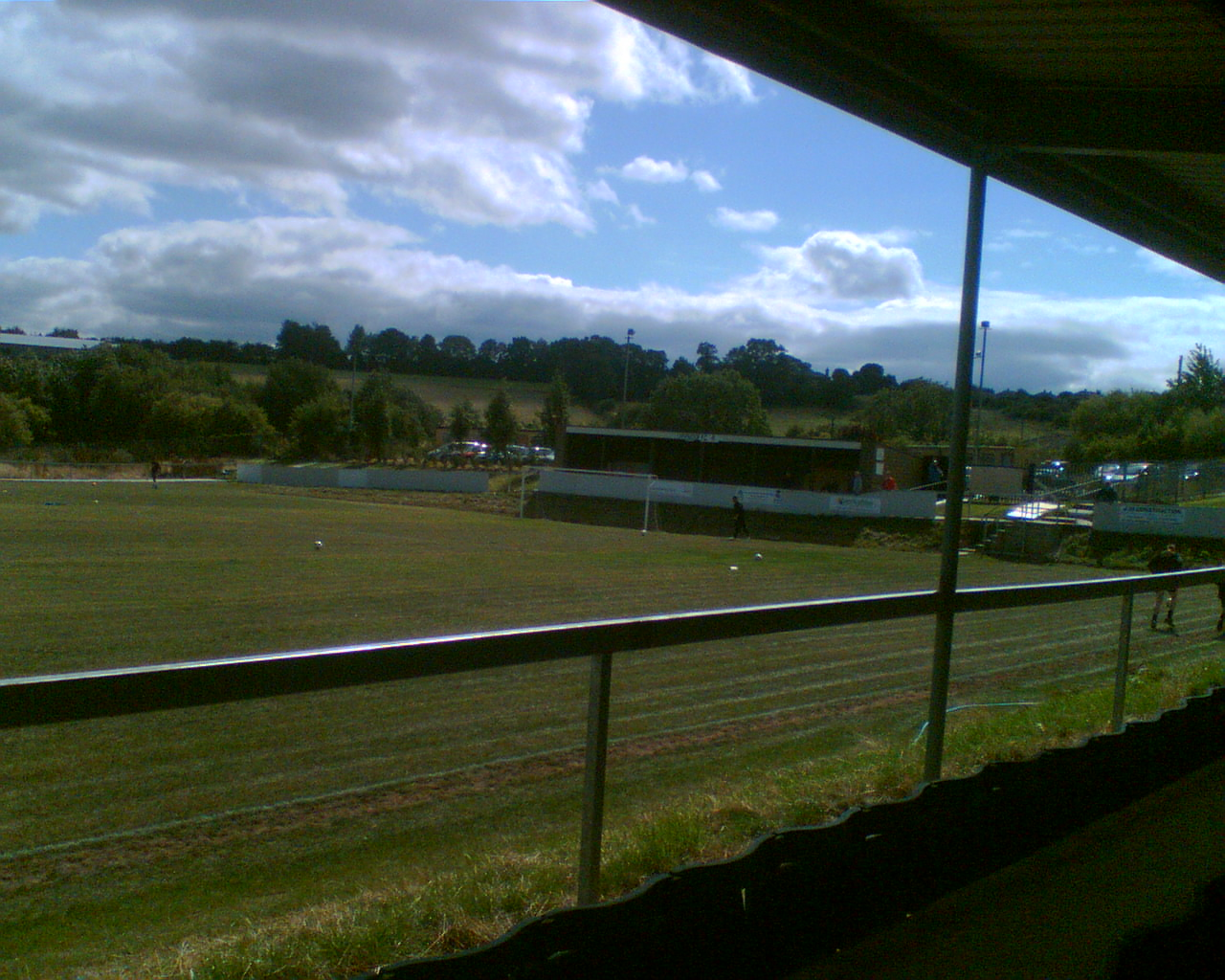
Behind the goal is the West Stand, home of The Sedge Kop

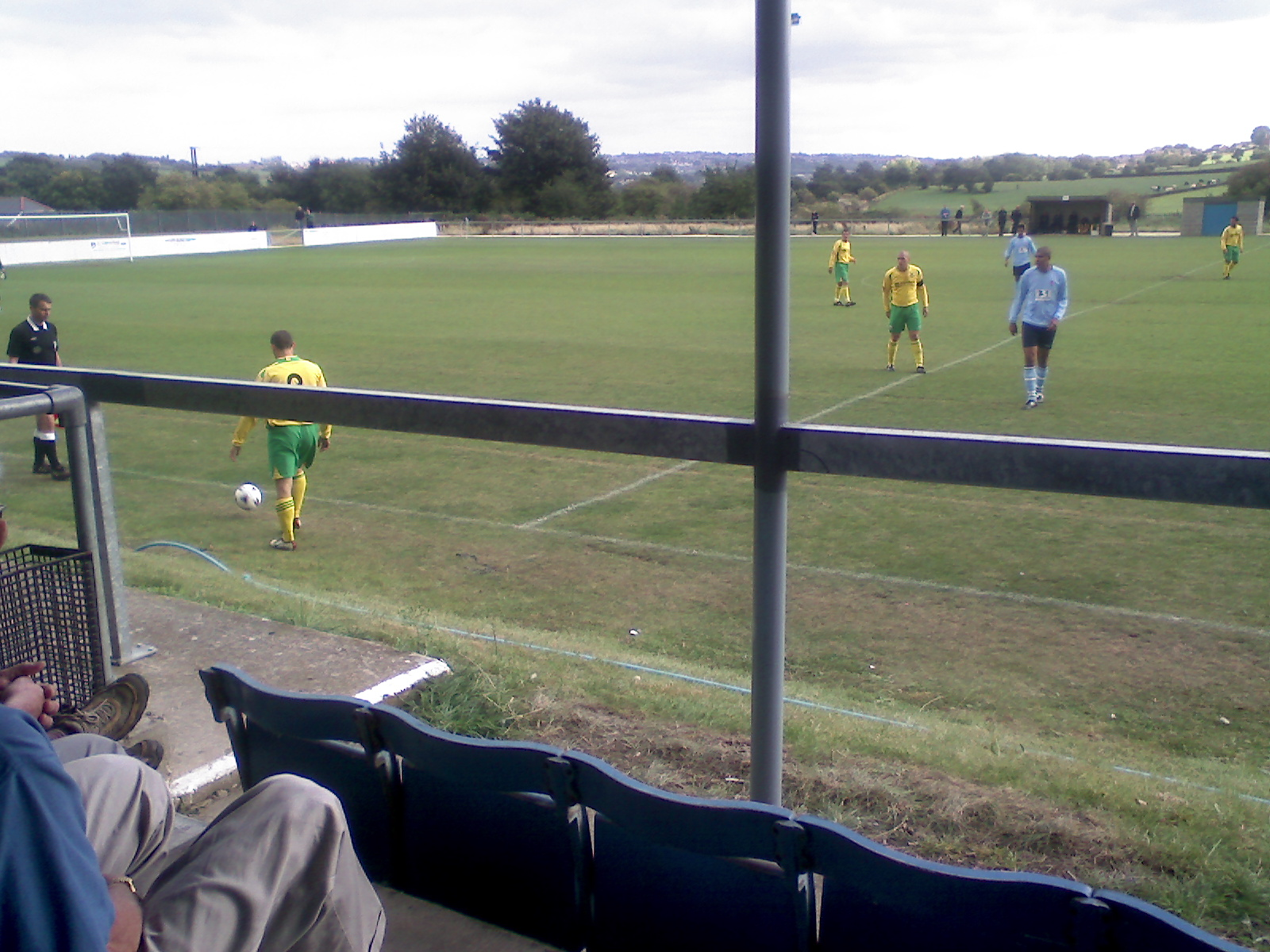
vs North Ferriby United in the FA Cup 1st Qualifying round 15 September 2017. Sedge had a 1–0 victory against the Northern Premier League side.
