= Handsworth, South Yorkshire =

Coordinates: 53.37°N 1.40°W

Handsworth
- Suburb
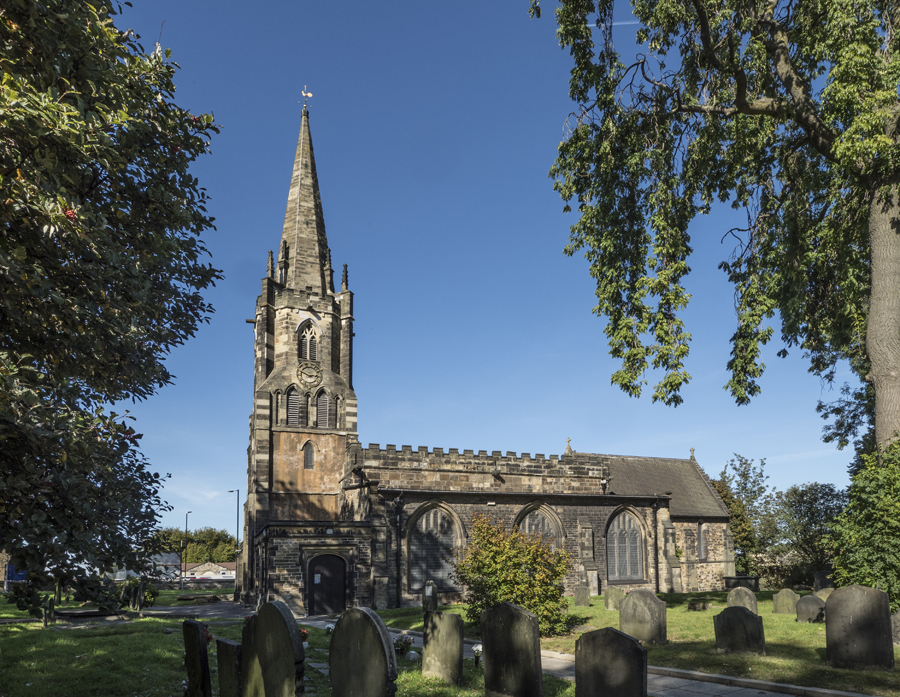
- St Mary’s Church

- Location within South Yorkshire
- Population: 9,957
- OS grid reference: SK416861
- Metropolitan borough: Sheffield
- Metropolitan county: South Yorkshire
- Region: Yorkshire and the Humber
- Country: England
- Sovereign state: United Kingdom
- Post town: SHEFFIELD
- Postcode district: S13
- Dialling code: 0114
- Police: South Yorkshire
- Fire: South Yorkshire
- Ambulance: Yorkshire
- UK Parliament: Sheffield South East

Handsworth is a suburb of south eastern Sheffield, in South Yorkshire, England. It covers an area of approximately 5 square miles (13 km^{2}), and has a population of approximately 9,957. It has five schools, four churches, a variety of small shops, a large supermarket, and a range of commercial and light industrial businesses. Until 1974 it was in the West Riding of Yorkshire.

Politically, Handsworth is part of the Woodhouse ward in the Sheffield South East parliamentary constituency.

== History ==
In 1931 the civil parish had a population of 17,472. On 1 April 1938 the parish was abolished and merged with Sheffield and Orgreave. It is now in the unparished area of Sheffield.

=== Domesday Book ===
In the Domesday Book account, Handsworth is spelt "Handeswrde" and is joined to Whiston ("Witestan") to form a single manor. Before the Conquest, Torchil (or Turchil) is reported as being the Lord of the manor, but following the Conquest lordship was transferred to Robert, Count of Mortain, who was the half-brother of William the Conqueror. Richard de Sourdeval held it for Count Robert. The Manor then passed, through marriage, to the Paynel and Lovetot families. It was a member of the Lovetot family who built the parish church in Handsworth.

=== St Mary's Church ===
St Mary's was built in about 1170. It was founded by the Norman lord William de Lovetot, or his father Richard, and the foundations were planned by William Paynel. (The church is not to be confused with St Mary's Church, Handsworth, in Birmingham.)

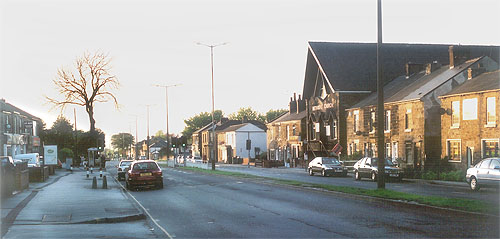
Handsworth, looking west

Little of the Tudor rectory remains today. Handsworth's parish registers, recording all baptisms, marriages and burials which took place in the parish of St Mary's, date back to 1558, the year that Queen Elizabeth I ascended the throne.

St Mary's Parish Centre holds displays of artefacts, documents, records, photographs and maps relating to Handsworth and its history.

== Handsworth sword dancers ==
One aspect of Handsworth history which remains very much alive is the traditional sword dancing. The origins of this ancient ritual are unknown, but written records held by the team go back to the middle of the 19th century.

Using long steel swords, a team of eight men perform a dance which lasts about nine minutes and ends with all the swords being interlocked and held aloft by one man. Traditional music is played and the dancers wear a military style uniform similar to the Dragoons.

Formerly there were two clowns who performed for the crowd and collected money. At Christmas time, the sword dancers would tour the local villages and public houses. The sword dancing continued until the First World War and there was a revival of interest during the late 1920s. It survived through the Second World War because the sword dancers had priority occupations in the coal mines and in the steel works, so they were not conscripted.

The traditional dancing on Boxing Day in Handsworth and Woodhouse was revived in 1963, and in 1976 the clowns were reintroduced, though they later lapsed. The historic sight of Handsworth sword dancing can still be seen on Boxing Day (or the day after if it falls on a Sunday). They dance at Woodhouse Cross at 11.15 and in front of St Mary's Church, Handsworth, at noon. The dancers and their audience then adjourn to the pub for well-earned refreshment and communal carol singing.

== Sport ==
Handsworth has been represented by three teams notable teams in senior football:

- Handsworth F.C. – Competed in the 1921–22 FA Cup, although little else is known about the club.
- Handsworth F.C. – The second club to take the name of Handsworth F.C. was formed in 2003, and after competing in the Sheffield County Senior League for seven years they won promotion to the Northern Counties East League. After two years in the NCEL they were relegated back to the County Senior League as their ground was deemed unfit to host NCEL football. After winning the County Senior League in 2014 they merged with Parramore Sports F.C. to form Handsworth Parramore F.C.
- Handsworth Parramore F.C. – Formed in 2014 as the result of a merger between Handsworth F.C. and Parramore Sports F.C. They were entered into the Northern Counties East League Premier Division and subsequently made their FA Cup debut. They changed their name to Handsworth F.C. in 2019.

== Notable people ==
=== Stayce family ===
The Handsworth parish registers reveal that on 1 July 1638, Mahlon Stayce was baptised in St Mary's Church. The Stayce family had lived at Ballifield Hall in Handsworth for centuries but it was in Trenton, New Jersey, in America, that Mahlon made his name and his fortune.

The Stayce family were Quakers, one of the new religious sects which surfaced in England after the Civil War. They dissented from traditional views and to "respectable" society, the Quakers appeared extreme and even revolutionary. Their leader, George Fox, preached on Cinder Hill Green in Handsworth to thousands of people in the 1650s. During the Interregnum, Quakers were treated with suspicion and hostility, and persecution continued following the restoration of Charles II, as they still refused to conform, even outwardly, to the Church of England. Their refusal to take off their hats or speak respectfully when in the presence of "nobles" made them a particular object of mistrust.

Some members of the Stayce family are buried in a private Quaker graveyard at Cinder Hill, now in the back garden of a house. There are eight gravestones with plain inscriptions.

=== Benjamin Huntsman ===
Another Quaker buried near Handsworth is Benjamin Huntsman. Although he was born in Lincolnshire, he lived for some years at Handsworth in the 1740s. Huntsman made a highly significant scientific discovery which enabled Sheffield to develop from small township into one of the leading northern industrial cities that shaped the destiny of Victorian Britain.

Huntsman revolutionised the technology of steel making through his invention of "cast" or "crucible steel". Whilst in Handsworth, he developed the process whereby it became possible to melt down raw or "blister steel" and produce cast ingots of steel. This required an extremely high temperature of 1,600 degrees Celsius, something which had never been achieved before in the steel industry. In order to produce and sustain such a high temperature in his furnace, Huntsman used coke instead of charcoal. To contain the steel he designed a clay crucible which could withstand the severe temperature and possible attack of the metal. It seems probable that Huntsman moved to Handsworth because he was aware of the nearby glassworks in Catcliffe where vessels were used in which the materials were melted at very high temperatures. Huntsman found that he could benefit in Handsworth not only from the experience of the glass makers but also from the ready access to refractory materials and fireclays in the Sheffield district.

Huntsman's techniques were initially given scant recognition in Sheffield. The local cutlers thought the new steel was too hard and difficult to handle. But rival Europeans nations, especially France, quickly took advantage of the superior quality of crucible steel. Eventually, this competition from overseas encouraged the Sheffield cutlers to adopt Huntsman's methods, thereby laying the foundations of Sheffield's industrial heritage. In 1740, Sheffield produced only 200 tons of steel per year; by 1860, this total had risen, because of the application of Huntsman's techniques, to over 80,000 tons per year—almost half of Europe's total tonnage.

=== William Jeffcock ===
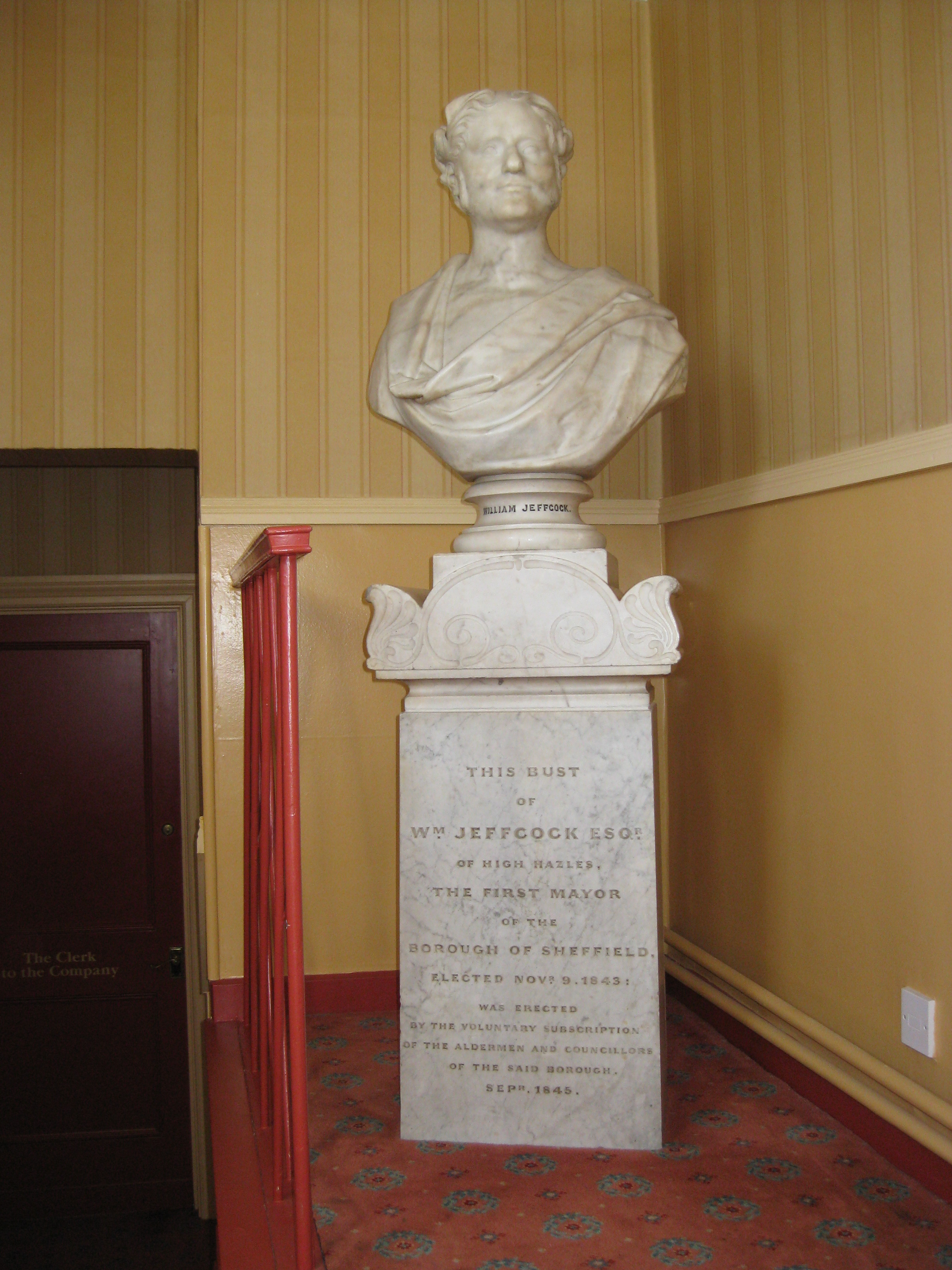
1845 bust in the Cutlers' Hall

William Jeffcock, who became the first Mayor of Sheffield in 1843, was born in April 1800 in Handsworth. His baptism is recorded in the parish registers; and, although he died in Ireland, he is buried in a family vault in Handsworth.

The Jeffcock family settled in Handsworth in the 17th century, having moved from Eckington, Derbyshire. The earliest record of the family name occurs in the court rolls of the manor of Eckington in 1351. But they settled in the Handsworth parish, and there are over 60 entries in the parish registers for members of the Jeffcock family between 1636 and 1768. John Jeffcock, father of William, established the family name as coal masters by becoming colliery engineer at Dore House Colliery in Handsworth. William was able to build upon his father's commercial success by entering the realm of the local government. He was keen to play an active role in the civic affairs and so became a candidate for Attercliffe ward in the town's first municipal elections on 1 November 1843. Although he polled only 80 votes, he was elected. Meeting for the first time on 9 November 1843, the new town council unanimously chose William Jeffcock to be the first mayor. He also became an Alderman and remained on the Council for 10 years. He was also nominated as a Justice of the Peace for the West Riding of Yorkshire in 1846 and he held a Commission in the West Yorkshire Yeomanry Cavalry for some time.

For many years, the Jeffcocks lived in nearby High Hazels. John Jeffcock was the first to live there, but it was his son William who built a new mansion on the site in 1850. The closeness of the Jeffcock connection to Handsworth can be seen in St Mary's churchyard. Two box tombs in memory of the family bear inscriptions to over a dozen Jeffcocks. There are other memorials to members of the Jeffcock family in St Mary's Church, and there is a (disused) fountain and water trough bearing inscriptions to the family on a curve of Handsworth Road.

=== Thomas Dunn ===
William Jeffcock was succeeded as Sheffield's Mayor in 1844 by his first cousin, Thomas Dunn, who was also a Handsworth resident. Dunn was elected to the first town council in 1843 and served on it for 16 years. He was an Alderman and became a distinguished figure in mid-Victorian Sheffield. Dunn had a considered Liberal point of view and he took an active and prominent role in Sheffield politics. His intellect and popularity made many national Liberals, as well as local ones, seek to persuade him to stand for parliament. His funeral in 1871 was attended by many local dignitaries.

=== Percy "Pick" Pickard ===
Group Captain Percy Charles "Pick" Pickard (1915–1944) was a Royal Air Force bomber pilot and commander during the Second World War. He was born in Handsworth and educated at Framlingham College. He is remembered for his role in the 1941 wartime propaganda film Target for Tonight, in which he featured as the pilot of "F-Freddie". He was killed on Operation Jericho in 1944. His sister, also born in Handsworth, was actress Helena Pickard, who married actor Sir Cedric Hardwicke and was the mother of actor Edward Hardwicke.

=== Sean Bean ===
Actor Sean Bean, born 1959, grew up in Handsworth and attended Brook School (now a housing estate). Bean appeared in the films The Lord of the Rings, Patriot Games, GoldenEye and more. He also starred in the historical TV series, Sharpe, and worldwide phenomenon Game of Thrones.
