= Handsworth F.C. (2003) =

Handsworth
- Full name: Handsworth Football Club
- Founded: 2003
- Dissolved: 2014
- Ground: Olivers Mount
- Capacity: 1,500
- 2013–14: Sheffield & Hallamshire County Senior Football League Premier Division, 1st
Home colours

Handsworth F.C. was an English football club based in Handsworth, Sheffield, South Yorkshire. They last played in the Sheffield & Hallamshire County Senior League, before merging with Parramore Sports F.C. in 2014 to form Handsworth Parramore F.C.

== History ==
The club was established in 2003, entering the Sheffield & Hallamshire County Senior League. In 2004–05, they finished third in Division Two, and were promoted to Division One. In 2007–08, they won Division One, and were promoted to the Premier Division. In 2009–10, they finished third in the Premier Division, and were promoted to Division One of the Northern Counties East Football League, winning the league in the 2011–12 season. However, Handworth were not able to be promoted to the Premier Division due to ground grading issues and instead had to move back down to the County Senior League.

In the summer of 2014, just weeks after winning the County Senior League Premier Division title for the first time, the club merged with Worksop Parramore to form Handsworth Parramore F.C. Five years later, the merged club dropped the Parramore suffix to become Handsworth FC.

=== League and cup history ===
Handsworth League and Cup history
Season	Division	Level	Position
2003–04	Sheffield & Hallamshire County Senior League Division Two	12	9th/15
2004–05	Sheffield & Hallamshire County Senior League Division Two	13	3rd/12
2005–06	Sheffield & Hallamshire County Senior League Division One	12	4th/13
2006–07	Sheffield & Hallamshire County Senior League Division One	12	6th/14
2007–08	Sheffield & Hallamshire County Senior League Division One	12	1st/13
2008–09	Sheffield & Hallamshire County Senior League Premier Division	11	7th/13
2009–10	Sheffield & Hallamshire County Senior League Premier Division	11	3rd/12
2010–11	Northern Counties East Football League Division One	10	4th/20
2011–12	Northern Counties East Football League Division One	10	1st/20
2012–13	Sheffield & Hallamshire County Senior League Premier Division	11	4th/15
2013–14	Sheffield & Hallamshire County Senior League Premier Division	11	1st/14

== Honours ==
=== League ===
- Northern Counties East Football League Division One
  - Champions: 2011–12
- Sheffield & Hallamshire County Senior League Premier Division
  - Champions: 2013–14
  - Promoted: 2009–10
- Sheffield & Hallamshire County Senior League Division One
  - Promoted: 2007–08 (champions)
- Sheffield & Hallamshire County Senior League Division Two
  - Promoted: 2004–05

=== Cup ===
- Northern Counties East Football League Presidents Cup
  - Winners: 2011–12

== Records ==
- Best League performance: 1st, Northern Counties East Football League Division One, 2011–12
- Record attendance: 297 vs. Hallam, Northern Counties East Football League Division One, 2011–12
