= Brian Makepeace =

English footballer (1931–2024)

Personal information
- Date of birth: 6 October 1931
- Place of birth: Rossington, England
- Date of death: June 2024 (aged 92)
- Position: Right-back

Youth career
- –1949: Rossington Miners Welfare
- 1949–1950: Doncaster Rovers

Senior career*
Years	Team	Apps	(Gls)
1951–1961	Doncaster Rovers	353	(0)
1962–1963	Boston United	23	(0)
Total		376	(0)
- * Club domestic league appearances and goals

Brian Makepeace (6 October 1931 – June 2024) was an English footballer who captained and played as a right-back for Doncaster Rovers.

== Career ==
=== Youth ===
Whilst working at the pit, Makepeace played for Rossington Miners Welfare before moving to Jackie Bestalls Doncaster Rovers juniors in March 1949 as a 17-year-old.

=== Doncaster Rovers ===
Makepeace's first game for the senior team was 17 February 1951 when Doncaster lost 4–2 away at Ewood Park against Blackburn Rovers, leaving Doncaster in 9th place in Division Two.

He later became club captain, and made a total of 378 appearances for Rovers in all competitions, without scoring a single goal.

He played for Boston United in the Midland League for the 1962–63 season.

On 28 December 2006, a testimonial match between a Doncaster XI and a fans XI was played for Makepeace. It was the last ever match to be played at Belle Vue.

== Personal life and death ==
His son-in-law is former West Bromwich Albion and Doncaster defender Paul Raven.

On 17 June 2024, Doncaster Rovers announced that Makepeace had died at the age of 92.
