= Sheffield & Hallamshire County Senior Football League =

Association football league in England

- Founded: 1983
- Country: England
- Number of clubs: 43; 16 (Premier Division); 14 (Division One); 13 (Division Two)
- Level on pyramid: Level 11 (Premier Division)
- Promotion to: Level 10; Northern Counties East League
- Relegation to: Level 14; Doncaster Saturday League; Huddersfield & District League; Wakefield & District League
- Domestic cup: League Cup
- Current champions: Premier Division; Hemsworth Miners Welfare; Division One; Ecclesfield Red Rose; Division Two; Denaby Main reserves (2024–25)
- Website: Results site

The Sheffield & Hallamshire County Senior Football League is an English football league that was founded in 1983 by the merger of the former Sheffield Association League and Hatchard League. The league has three divisions – the Premier Division (which stands at level 11 of the English football league system), Division One and Division Two.

Member clubs are usually affiliated with the Sheffield & Hallamshire FA, which covers almost all of South Yorkshire, and outlying areas of West Yorkshire, Derbyshire and Nottinghamshire.

== History ==
The competition was formed in 1983 as the result of a merger between two long standing competitions -

- The Hatchard League, formed in 1894 and named after a local politician who donated the trophy to the Sheffield & Hallamshire FA. It disbanded in 1923 but reformed after the Second World War.

- The Sheffield Association League, formed in 1897. In 1960 the league was renamed the Sheffield & Hallamshire County Senior League, a name that was retained by the new competition.

In 2011 the Football Association awarded the league's top division Step 7 status (level 11 overall) in the English football league system.

== Format ==
For the first nine seasons of its existence the league ran with four divisions, but since 1992 there have been three divisions.

Teams play each other twice a season, and there is promotion and relegation between each division at the end of the season. As a Regional Feeder League, one Premier Division club per season can gain promotion to Step 6 (usually the Northern Counties East League), but the applying club must finish inside the top five at the end of the season and achieve the required ground grading standard.

There are three feeder leagues sitting below the County Senior League in the pyramid - the Doncaster Saturday League, Huddersfield & District League and Wakefield & District League, although promotion and relegation between the competitions is rare.

Reserve teams of clubs higher up the league pyramid play in the league, but only a maximum of three are allowed to play in the Premier Division.

== Current member clubs (2026–27) ==
=== Premier Division ===
Club	Home ground	2025–26 position
AFC Dronfield	Gosforth Playing Fields, Dronfield Woodhouse	5th
Denaby Main	Tickhill Square, Denaby	6th
Dodworth Miners Welfare	Dodworth Miners Welfare, Dodworth	9th
Ecclesfield Red Rose	Hillsborough College, Owlerton	Div One, 1st
Handsworth reserves	Olivers Mount, Handsworth	8th
Hepworth United	Far Lane, Hepworth	3rd
Kiveton Park	Hard Lane, Kiveton Park	12th
Nostell Miners Welfare	Olympic Legacy Park, Attercliffe	NCEL Prem Div, 14th
Oughtibridge War Memorial	War Memorial Ground, Oughtibridge	7th
Penistone Church reserves	Memorial Ground, Penistone	4th
Silkstone United	Silkstone Recreation Ground, Silkstone	13th
South Elmsall United Services	Westfield Lane, South Elmsall	11th
Stocksbridge Park Steels reserves	Bracken Moor, Stocksbridge	2nd
Swinton Athletic	Swinton Miners Welfare, Swinton	Div One, 2nd
Thorncliffe Villa	St George's Park, High Green	Div One, 3rd
Wombwell Main	Wombwell Main, Wombwell	10th

Location of clubs participating in the 2026–27 County Senior League Premier Division

=== Division One ===
Club	Home ground	2025–26 position
Barnsley Town	Sheerien Park, Athersley	4th
Bentley Village	Bentley Road, Bentley	10th
Dearne & District reserves	Welfare Ground, Goldthorpe	Div Two, 2nd
Denaby Main reserves	Tickhill Square, Denaby	Div Two, 1st
Dinnington Town reserves	Laughton Road, Dinnington	11th
Hepworth United reserves	Far Lane, Hepworth	8th
Jubilee Sports	Jubilee Sports & Social Club, Hillsborough	Prem Div, 14th
Maltby Main reserves	Muglet Lane, Maltby	Div Two, 4th
North Gawber Colliery	Woolley Miners Welfare, Darton	7th
Parkgate reserves	Roundwood Sports Club, Rawmarsh	5th
Royston	Rabbit Ings Country Park, Royston	9th
Sheffield City	Olympic Legacy Park, Attercliffe	12th
Sheffield Union	Warminster Road, Norton Lees	6th
Swinton Athletic reserves	Swinton Miners Welfare, Swinton	Div Two, 3rd

Location of clubs participating in the 2026–27 County Senior League Division One

=== Division Two ===
Club	Home ground	2025–26 position
AFC Dronfield reserves	Gosforth Playing Fields, Dronfield Woodhouse	New
Dodworth Miners Welfare reserves	Dodworth Miners Welfare, Dodworth	New
Dronfield Town reserves	Stonelow, Dronfield	New
Middlewood Rovers	Waverley Lane, Handsworth	12th
North Gawber Colliery reserves	Woolley Miners Welfare, Darton	7th
Rotherham Town	Recreation Ground, Canklow	8th
Sheffield Medics	Warminster Road, Norton Lees	10th
Treeton Terriers	Washfield Lane, Treeton	New
Tusaale United	The Soccer Centre, Darnall	6th
West End Terriers	Sandygate, Hemsworth	New
Wombwell Main reserves	Wombwell Main, Wombwell	5th
Wombwell Town reserves	Recreation Ground, Wombwell	New
Youdan	Olympic Legacy Park, Attercliffe	11th

Location of clubs participating in the 2026–27 County Senior League Division Two

== Champions ==
Season	Premier Division	Division One	Division Two	Division Three
1983–84	Windsor	Crookes	Woodsetts	Stella
1984–85	Ecclesfield Red Rose	Firparnians	Brunsmeer Athletic	Staveley Works reserves
1985–86	BSC Parkgate Reserves	Oxley Park	Worsbrough Bridge Miners Welfare reserves	Bradley
1986–87	Mexborough Main Street	Maltby Miners Welfare reserves	Parramore Sports	Denaby & Cadeby Miners Welfare
1987–88	Ash House	Ecclesfield Red Rose	Denaby & Cadeby Miners Welfare	Caribbean Sports
1988–89	Ash House	Denaby & Cadeby Miners Welfare	Goldthorpe Colliery	Wath St. James
1989–90	Ash House	Caribbean Sports	Wath St. James	Treble
1990–91	Ash House	Wath Saracens Athletic	Thurcroft Ivanhoe	High Green Villa
1991–92	Phoenix	Frecheville Community Association	High Green Villa	Staveley Miners Welfare
1992–93	Frecheville Community Association	High Green Villa	Staveley Miners Welfare	
1993–94	Mexborough Main Street	Penistone Church	Grimethorpe Miners Welfare	
1994–95	Frecheville Community Association	Grimethorpe Miners Welfare	Davy	
1995–96	High Green Villa	Ecclesfield Red Rose	Wickersley Old Boys	
1996–97	Denaby & Cadeby Miners Welfare	Swinton Athletic	Wombwell Main	
1997–98	Phoenix	The Wetherby	Athersley Recreation	
1998–99	Wombwell Main	Hare & Hounds	Norton Woodseats	
1999–00	Athersley Recreation	Wickersley Old Boys	Grapes Roy Hancock	
2000–01	The Wetherby	Penistone Church	South Kirkby Colliery	
2001–02	Wombwell Main	Wickersley Old Boys	Elm Tree	
2002–03	Wombwell Main	Elm Tree	Edlington Working Mens Club	
2003–04	Athersley Recreation	Hollinsend Amateur	AFC Barnsley	
2004–05	Athersley Recreation	Edlington Working Mens Club	Dodworth Miners Welfare	
2005–06	Mexborough Main Street	Sheffield Lane Top	Parkgate reserves	
2006–07	Athersley Recreation	Davy	Worsbrough Bridge Athletic reserves	
2007–08	Wombwell Main	Handsworth	Millmoor Juniors	
2008–09	Athersley Recreation	Sheffield reserves	Aston	
2009–10	Sheffield reserves	Ecclesfield Red Rose	Frecheville Community Association	
2010–11	Swallownest Miners Welfare	Handsworth reserves	Houghton Main	
2011–12	Athersley Recreation	Houghton Main	Athersley Recreation reserves	
2012–13	Shaw Lane Aquaforce	Oughtibridge War Memorial	Jubilee Sports	
2013–14	Handsworth	Jubilee Sports	North Gawber Colliery	
2014–15	Swinton Athletic	North Gawber Colliery	Denaby Main	
2015–16	Frecheville Community Association	Denaby United	Hemsworth Miners Welfare reserves	
2016–17	Swallownest	Grimethorpe Sports	North Dodworth Miners Welfare; South Sheffield Medics	
2017–18	Swinton Athletic	Dodworth Miners Welfare	Burngreave	
2018–19	North Gawber Colliery	Burngreave	Wombwell Town	
2019–20	Season abandoned owing to COVID-19 pandemic			
2020–21	Season abandoned owing to COVID-19 pandemic			
2021–22	Wakefield	Wombwell Town	Silkstone United	
2022–23	Swinton Athletic	South Elmsall United Services	Doncaster City	
2023–24	Penistone Church reserves	AFC Dronfield	Barnsley Town	
2024–25	Oughtibridge War Memorial	Kiveton Park	Wombwell Town reserves	
2025–26	Hemsworth Miners Welfare	Ecclesfield Red Rose		

=== Promoted ===
Since the league's formation in 1983, the following clubs (with their league position in brackets) have won promotion to the Northern Counties East League -

- 2009–10 - Handsworth (3rd)
- 2011–12 - Athersley Recreation (1st)
- 2012–13 - Shaw Lane Aquaforce (1st)
- 2013–14 - Penistone Church (4th)
- 2016–17 - Swallownest (1st)
- 2021–22 - Wakefield (1st)
- 2022–23 - Wombwell Town (5th)

== League Cup ==
The league also runs a League Cup competition, which is open to all clubs in the league.

=== Finals ===
Season	Winner	Result	Runner-up	Venue
1983–84	Swinton Athletic	3 – 1	Rotherham Club	Parkgate
1984–85	Arthur Lee	3 – 2	BSC Parkgate reserves	Hallam
1985–86	BSC Parkgate reserves	2 – 1	Crookes	Frecheville
1986–87	Maltby Miners Welfare reserves	1 – 1p	Mexborough Main Street	Davys
1987–88	Sheffield reserves	1 – 0	Mexborough Main Street	Frecheville
1988–89	Aurora United	2 – 1	Woodsetts Welfare	Frecheville
1989–90	Mexborough Northgate	3 – 2	Wath Saracens Athletic	Parkgate
1990–91	Woodsetts Welfare	3 – 1	Ecclesfield Red Rose	Parkgate
1991–92	Ash House	1 – 0	Phoenix	Stocksbridge
1992–93	Frecheville Community Association	5 – 4	Goldthorpe Colliery	Stocksbridge
1993–94	Mexborough Main Street	3 – 2	Frecheville Community Association	Worsbrough
1994–95	Ash House	Awarded to Ash House - semi-finalists disqualified		
1995–96	Worsbridge Bridge Athletic reserves	3 – 2	Grimethorpe Miners Welfare	Stocksbridge
1996–97	Swinton Athletic	2 – 1	Wath Saracens	Stocksbridge
1997–98	Athersley Recreation	2 – 0	Ecclesfield Red Rose	Stocksbridge
1998–99	Frecheville Community Association	1 – 0	Phoenix	Stocksbridge
1999–00	Frecheville Community Association	2 – 0	Athersley Recreation	Stocksbridge
2000–01	Worksop Town reserves	3 – 2	The Wetherby	Stocksbridge
2001–02	Wombwell Main	1 – 0	Hallam reserves	Stocksbridge
2002–03	Edlington Working Mens Club	1 – 0	Penistone Church	Stocksbridge
2003–04	AFC Barnsley	4 – 0	Elm Tree	Stocksbridge
2004–05	Sportsman Roy Hancock	5 – 0	Handsworth	Stocksbridge
2005–06	Athersley Recreation	2 – 0	Thorpe Hesley	Stocksbridge
2006–07	Stocksbridge Park Steels reserves	1 – 0	Wombwell Main	Stocksbridge
2007–08	Wombwell Main	4 – 0	Caribbean Sports	Stocksbridge
2008–09	Athersley Recreation	3 – 1	Thorpe Hesley	Stocksbridge
2009–10	Stocksbridge Park Steels reserves	1 – 0	Dinnington Town reserves	Stocksbridge
2010–11	Athersley Recreation	1 – 0	Sheffield reserves	Stocksbridge
2011–12	Penistone Church	2 – 0	Thorpe Hesley	Worksop
2012–13	Wombwell Main	3 – 0	High Green Villa	Worksop
2013–14	Penistone Church	3 – 1	Houghton Main	Worksop
2014–15	Oughtibridge War Memorial	3 – 0	Joker	Worksop
2015–16	Jubilee Sports	5 – 4	Grimethorpe Sports	Worksop
2016–17	Swallownest	5 – 1	Brinsworth Whitehill	Penistone
2017–18	Swinton Athletic	3 – 2	Sheffield Medics	Penistone
2018–19	North Gawber Colliery	2 – 1	Grimethorpe Sports	Stocksbridge
2019–20	Season abandoned owing to COVID-19 pandemic			
2020–21	Swinton Athletic	3 – 1	Handsworth reserves	Wombwell Main
2021–22	Not played			
2022–23	Hepworth United	1 – 0	Penistone Church reserves	Athersley
2023–24	Hemsworth Miners Welfare	2(p)– 2Penalty shoot-out	Dodworth Miners Welfare	Rotherham
2024-25	Wombwell Main	2 – 1	Handsworth reserves	Doncaster
