= Fryston Colliery Welfare F.C. =

Fryston Colliery Welfare
- Dissolved: 2002

Fryston Colliery Welfare F.C. was an English football club based in Fryston village, West Yorkshire.

== History ==
The team participated in the Yorkshire Football League, Northern Counties East League and Central Midlands League, as well as the FA Vase.
