= Maltby Main F.C. =

Association football club in England

Coordinates: 53°25′00.56″N 1°11′30.08″W

Maltby Main
- Full name: Maltby Main Football Club
- Nickname: The Miners
- Founded: 1916
- Ground: Muglet Lane, Maltby
- Capacity: 2,000 (150 seated)
- Chairman: Kieron White
- Manager: James Kaye
- League: United Counties League Division One
- 2025–26: Northern Counties East League Division One, 14th of 22
Home colours

Maltby Main Football Club is a football club based in Maltby, Rotherham, South Yorkshire. They are currently members of the United Counties League Division One and play at Muglet Lane.

== History ==
The club was established in 1916 as Maltby Main, with the players all working at Maltby Main Colliery. They joined the Sheffield Association League in 1919 when it restarted after World War I, and were runners-up in 1923–24 before winning back-to-back league titles in 1925–26 and 1926–27. In 1929 the club dropped into the Rotherham Minor League. They transferred to the Sheffield Amateur League in 1936 and were runners-up in their first season in the league, going on to win the championship play-off with a 2–1 win over Sheffield Training College. They returned to the Sheffield Association League in 1939, before moving to the Rotherham Association League in 1942, where they played until returning to the Sheffield Association League again in 1945.

In 1949 Maltby moved up to Division Two of the Yorkshire League. They finished bottom of the division in 1950–51, 1951–52 and 1952–53 and again in 1954–55, after which the club dropped into the Rotherham Association League for one season before withdrawing from all competitions in 1956–57. They returned to the Rotherham Association League in 1957, before joining Division Three of the Doncaster & District Senior League the following year. A third-place finish in their first season in the league saw the club promoted to Division Two. In 1959 the club were renamed Maltby Miners Welfare. In 1960–61 they finished fourth in Division Two and were promoted to Division One, and in 1963–64 the club were league champions. They transferred to Division Two of the Sheffield Association League in 1965, winning the division at the first attempt to secure promotion to Division One.

Maltby were relegated back to Division Two at the end of the 1967–68 season, having finishing second-from-bottom of Division One. The club subsequently folded in 1970, but were reformed in 1972 and joined Division Two of the Sheffield Association League. The following year saw the club rejoin the Yorkshire League, entering Division Three. They were Division Three runners-up in 1973–74 and were promoted to Division Two. A fourth-place finish in Division Two the following season saw the club promoted to Division One. However, they were relegated back to Division Two after a single season. Although the club were promoted again in 1979–80, they spent only a single season in Division One before being relegated again.

In 1982 the Yorkshire League merged with the Midland League to form the Northern Counties East League, with Maltby placed in Division One South. They were moved into Division One Central in 1984, before being placed in Division Two the following year amidst league reorganisation. Despite only finishing sixth in Division Two in 1985–86, the club were promoted to Division One. A fifth-place finish in 1989–90 saw them promoted to the Premier Division. They won the league's Presidents Cup in 1992–93. In 1996 the club reverted to their original name of Maltby Main.

Maltby were relegated to Division One at the end of the 1999–2000 season. However, after finishing third in Division One in 2003–04, the club were promoted back to the Premier Division. They finished bottom of the Premier Division in 2023–24 and were relegated to Division One. At the end of the 2025–26 season the club were transferred to Division One of the United Counties League.

=== Season-by-season record ===
Season	Division	Level	Position	FA Cup	FA Amateur Cup	FA Vase	Notes
1919–20	Sheffield Association League			–	–	–	
1920–21	Sheffield Association League			1QR	–	–	
1921–22	Sheffield Association League			EPR	–	–	
1922–23	Sheffield Association League		6/16	1QR	–	–	
1923–24	Sheffield Association League		2/18	2QR	–	–	
1924–25	Sheffield Association League		5/15	3QR	–	–	
1925–26	Sheffield Association League		1/13	PR	–	–	League champions
1926–27	Sheffield Association League			PR	–	–	League champions (won play-off)
1927–28	Sheffield Association League			EPR	–	–	
1928–29	Sheffield Association League		14/15	–	–	–	
1929–30	Rotherham Minor League			PR	–	–	
1930–31	Rotherham Minor League			–	–	–	
1931–32	Rotherham Minor League			–	–	–	
1932–33	Rotherham Senior League			–	–	–	
1933–34	Rotherham Senior League			–	–	–	
1934–35	Rotherham Senior League			–	–	–	
1935–36	Rotherham Senior League			–	–	–	
1936–37	Sheffield Amateur League		2/10	–	–	–	League champions (won play-off)
1937–38	Sheffield Amateur League		6/10	–	–	–	
1938–39	Sheffield Amateur League			–	–	–	
1939–40	Sheffield Association League			–	–	–	
1940–41	Club did not enter any competitions due to World War II						
1941-42	Club did not enter any competitions due to World War II						
1942–43	Rotherham Association League		Withdrew	–	–	–	
1943–44	Rotherham Association League			–	–	–	
1944–45	Rotherham Association League			–	–	–	
1945–46	Sheffield Association League			–	–	–	
1946–47	Sheffield Association League			PR	3QR	–	
1947–48	Sheffield Association League	-		PR	PR	–	
1948–49	Sheffield Association League	-		EPR	PR	–	
1949–50	Yorkshire League Division Two	-	16/18	EPR	1QR	–	
1950–51	Yorkshire League Division Two	-	17/17	PR	PR	–	
1951–52	Yorkshire League Division Two	-	13/13	–	PR	–	
1952–53	Yorkshire League Division Two	-	14/14	–	–	–	
1953–54	Yorkshire League Division Two	-	14/16	–	–	–	
1954–55	Yorkshire League Division Two	-	16/14	–	–	–	
1955–56	Rotherham Association League	-		–	–	–	
1956–57	Did not enter any competitions						
1957–58	Rotherham Association League	-		–	–	–	
1958–59	Doncaster & District Senior League Division Three	-	3/11	–	–	–	Promoted
1959–60	Doncaster & District Senior League Division Two	-	7/12	–	–	–	
1960–61	Doncaster & District Senior League Division Two	-	4/13	–	–	–	Promoted
1961–62	Doncaster & District Senior League Division One	-		–	–	–	
1962–63	Doncaster & District Senior League Division One	-		–	–	–	
1963–64	Doncaster & District Senior League Division One	-	1/12	–	–	–	League champions
1964–65	Doncaster & District Senior League Division One	-	8/12	–	PR	–	
1965–66	Sheffield Association League Division Two	-	1/15	–	–	–	League champions, promoted
1966–67	Sheffield Association League Division One	-		–	–	–	
1967–68	Sheffield Association League Division One	-	15/16	–	–	–	Relegated
1968–69	Sheffield Association League Division Two	-		–	–	–	
1969–70	Sheffield Association League Division Two	-		–	–	–	
Club dissolved (1970) and reformed (1972)
1972–73	Sheffield Association League Division Two	-	2/16	–	–	–	Promoted
1973–74	Yorkshire League Division Three	-	2/16	–	–	–	Promoted
1974–75	Yorkshire League Division Two	-	4/15	–	–	–	Promoted
1975–76	Yorkshire League Division One	-	14/16	–	–	2R	Relegated
1976–77	Yorkshire League Division Two	-	11/16	–	–	2R	
1977–78	Yorkshire League Division Two	-	7/15	–	–	2R	
1978–79	Yorkshire League Division Two	-	8/16	–	–	–	
1979–80	Yorkshire League Division Two	-	4/16	–	–	–	Promoted
1980–81	Yorkshire League Division One	-	14/16	–	–	–	Relegated
1981–82	Yorkshire League Division Two	-	5/16	–	–	–	
1982–83	Northern Counties East League Division One South	-	6/14	–	–	–	
1983–84	Northern Counties East League Division One South	-	6/14	–	–	–	Transferred
1984–85	Northern Counties East League Division One Central	-	12/16	–	–	2R	Transferred
1985–86	Northern Counties East League Division Two	-	6/16	–	–	PR	Promoted
1986–87	Northern Counties East League Division One	-	9/18	–	–	PR	
1987–88	Northern Counties East League Division One	-	3/16	–	–	3R	
1988–89	Northern Counties East League Division One	-	4/16	–	–	1R	
1989–90	Northern Counties East League Division One	-	5/15	–	–	1R	Promoted
1990–91	Northern Counties East League Premier Division	-	6/16	–	–	1R	
1991–92	Northern Counties East League Premier Division	-	7/19	PR	–	EPR	
1992–93	Northern Counties East League Premier Division	-	4/20	PR	–	EPR	
1993–94	Northern Counties East League Premier Division	-	7/20	1QR	–	3R	
1994–95	Northern Counties East League Premier Division	-	13/20	1QR	–	PR	
1995–96	Northern Counties East League Premier Division	-	19/20	PR	–	2QR	
1996–97	Northern Counties East League Premier Division	-	14/20	–	–	2QR	
1997–98	Northern Counties East League Premier Division	-	6/20	PR	–	1QR	
1998–99	Northern Counties East League Premier Division	-	18/20	1QR	–	2QR	
1999–00	Northern Counties East League Premier Division	-	17/20	–	–	–	Relegated
2000–01	Northern Counties East League Division One	-	9/16	–	–	1QR	
2001–02	Northern Counties East League Division One	-	6/16	1QR	–	1QR	
2002–03	Northern Counties East League Division One	-	15/17	EPR	–	2QR	
2003–04	Northern Counties East League Division One	-	3/18	2QR	–	1QR	Promoted
2004–05	Northern Counties East League Premier Division	9	19/20	2QR	–	1R	
2005–06	Northern Counties East League Premier Division	9	18/20	–	–	–	
2006–07	Northern Counties East League Premier Division	9	10/20	–	–	2QR	
2007–08	Northern Counties East League Premier Division	9	18/20	EPR	–	1R	
2008–09	Northern Counties East League Premier Division	9	12/20	EPR	–	2QR	
2009–10	Northern Counties East League Premier Division	9	16/20	EPR	–	2QR	
2010–11	Northern Counties East League Premier Division	9	11/20	PR	–	1QR	
2011–12	Northern Counties East League Premier Division	9	18/20	EPR	–	1QR	
2012–13	Northern Counties East League Premier Division	9	14/22	1QR	–	2QR	
2013–14	Northern Counties East League Premier Division	9	15/23	EPR	–	1QR	
2014–15	Northern Counties East League Premier Division	9	19/21	PR	–	2QR	
2015–16	Northern Counties East League Premier Division	9	7/22	1QR	–	2R	
2016–17	Northern Counties East League Premier Division	9	14/22	EPR	–	1QR	
2017–18	Northern Counties East League Premier Division	9	5/22	EPR	–	1QR	
2018–19	Northern Counties East League Premier Division	9	6/20	1QR	–	2QR	
2019–20	Northern Counties East League Premier Division	9	–	1QR	–	1QR	Season abandoned due to COVID-19 pandemic
2020–21	Northern Counties East League Premier Division	9	–	PR	–	2R	Season abandoned due to COVID-19 pandemic
2021–22	Northern Counties East League Premier Division	9	11/20	PR	–	2QR	
2022–23	Northern Counties East League Premier Division	9	13/20	EPR	–	2QR	
2023–24	Northern Counties East League Premier Division	9	20/20	PR	–	2QR	Relegated
2024–25	Northern Counties East League Division One	10	10/22	–	–	2QR	
2025–26	Northern Counties East League Division One	10	14/22	–	–	1R	
Season	Division	Level	Position	FA Cup	FA Amateur Cup	FA Vase	Notes
Source: Football Club History Database

== Ground ==
Muglet Lane in 2018.

The club plays at Muglet Lane in Maltby. The ground has a capacity of 2,000, of which 150 is seated and 300 covered. The record attendance of 1,500 was set in June 1991 for a friendly match against Sheffield Wednesday.

== List of managers ==
- 1979–????: Dick Habbin
- 1983-1984: Alan Turner
- 1985-1989: Richard 'Dick' Habbin
- 1989–1993: Colin Walker
- 1993–1994: Gary Waller
- 1994–1996: Richard Moon
- 1996–1998: Dave McCarthy
- 1998–1999: Steve Fleetwood
- 1999–2000: Glyn Kenny
- 2000: Paul Cavell
- 2000–????: Russ Eagle
- 2001–2002: Wilf Race
- 2002: Mark Smith
- 2002: Gary Kitching
- 2002–2005: Shaun Goodwin
- 2005–2006: Wilf Race
- 2006–2008: Sean Kay
- 2008: Robbie Barron
- 2008–2012: Steve Adams
- 2012–2013: Chris Dunn
- 2013: Brian Cushworth
- 2013–2015: Mick Norbury
- 2015–2017: Spencer Fearn

== Honours ==
- Northern Counties East League
  - Presidents Cup winners 1992–93
- Doncaster & District Senior League
  - Division One champions 1963–64
- Sheffield Association League
  - Champions 1925–26, 1926–27
  - Division Two champions 1965–66
- Sheffield Amateur League
  - Champions 1936–37
- Sheffield & Hallamshire Senior Cup
  - Winners 1977–78
- Rotherham Challenge Cup
  - Winners 1928–29, 1935–36, 1962–63, 1963–64
- Wharncliffe Charity Cup
  - Winners 1919–20 1964–65 1979–80 1980–81
- Rotherham Charity Cup
  - Winners 1923–24, 1966–67, 1976–77, 1980–81, 1990–91, 2005–06
- Mexborough Montagu Cup
  - Winners 1962–63, 1980–81

== Records ==
- Best FA Cup performance: Third qualifying round, 1924–25
- Best FA Amateur Cup performance: Third qualifying round, 1946–47
- Best FA Vase performance: Third round, 1987–88, 1993–94
- Record attendance: 1,500 vs Sheffield Wednesday, friendly, 1991–92

== See also ==
- Maltby Main F.C. players
- Maltby Main F.C. managers
