= Parramore Sports F.C. =

Coordinates: 53.31153°N 1.13139°W

Parramore F.C.
- Full name: Parramore Sports Football Club
- Founded: 1936
- Dissolved: 2013

Parramore Sports F.C. was an English football club from Sheffield, South Yorkshire, but based later in its existence in Worksop, Nottinghamshire.

== History ==
Parramore Sports was established in 1936 as the works team of ironfounders F Parramore & Sons. They played in local works leagues for a large part of their history before moving into the Sheffield and Hallamshire County Senior League (S&HCSL) in 1985. They flitted between the Premier Division and Division 1 of the S&HCSL for nearly two decades before leaving for the Central Midlands League (CMFL) in 2008, playing at the Don Valley Stadium.

They were promoted to the Supreme Division of the CMFL after their first season in the competition, before changing name to Sheffield Parramore in 2010. Parramore won the CMFL Supreme Division title in 2011, earning promotion to the Northern Counties East League (NCEL). Prior to the start of their first NCEL season, Parramore manager Peter Whitehead bought Worksop Town's disused Sandy Lane ground and moved the club to the town, renaming them Worksop Parramore.

Their rise through the English football league system continued when they won promotion from NCEL Division 1 in their first season, earning a place in the FA Vase for the 2012–13 season. A year later they entered the FA Cup for the first time.

In 2013 the club merged with Handsworth F.C. to form Handsworth Parramore F.C. The new club entered step 5 of the English football league system for the start of the 2014–15 season, remaining at Sandy Lane.

=== Notable former players ===
Players that played in the Football League either before or after being with Parramore:

- Jamie Green
- Lee Thompson

=== League and cup history ===
Parramore League and Cup history
Season	Division	Level	Position	FA Cup	FA Vase
1990–91	Sheffield & Hallamshire County Senior League Premier Division		3rd/14	-	-
1991–92	Sheffield & Hallamshire County Senior League Premier Division		10th/14	-	-
1992–93	Sheffield & Hallamshire County Senior League Premier Division		6th/14	-	-
1993–94	Sheffield & Hallamshire County Senior League Premier Division		5th/14	-	-
1994–95	Sheffield & Hallamshire County Senior League Premier Division		10th/14	-	-
1995–96	Sheffield & Hallamshire County Senior League Premier Division		7th/14	-	-
1996–97	Sheffield & Hallamshire County Senior League Premier Division		12th/14	-	-
1997–98	Sheffield & Hallamshire County Senior League Division 1		6th/13	-	-
1998–99	Sheffield & Hallamshire County Senior League Division 1		7th/14	-	-
1999–00	Sheffield & Hallamshire County Senior League Division 1		3rd/14	-	-
2000–01	Sheffield & Hallamshire County Senior League Premier Division		13th/14	-	-
2001–02	Sheffield & Hallamshire County Senior League Division 1		7th/14	-	-
2002–03	Sheffield & Hallamshire County Senior League Division 1		6th/14	-	-
2003–04	Sheffield & Hallamshire County Senior League Division 1		11th/13	-	-
2004–05	Sheffield & Hallamshire County Senior League Division 1		12th/14	-	-
2005–06	Sheffield & Hallamshire County Senior League Division 1		6th/13	-	-
2006–07	Sheffield & Hallamshire County Senior League Division 1		13th/14	-	-
2007–08	Sheffield & Hallamshire County Senior League Division 1		5th/13	-	-
2008–09	Central Midlands League Premier Division	12	4th/15	-	-
2009–10	Central Midlands League Supreme Division	11	8th/18	-	-
2010–11	Central Midlands League Supreme Division	11	1st/18	-	-
2011–12	Northern Counties East League Division 1	10	3rd/20	-	-
2012–13	Northern Counties East League Premier Division	9	7th/22	-	1st qualifying round
2013–14	Northern Counties East League Premier Division	9	4th/23	1st qualifying round	2nd round

== Honours ==
=== League ===
- Northern Counties East League
  - Promoted: 2011–12
- Central Midlands League Supreme Division
  - Champions: 2010–11
- Central Midlands League Premier Division
  - Promoted: 2008–09
- Sheffield & Hallamshire County Senior League Division 1
  - Promoted: 1999-00

=== Cup ===
None

== Records ==
- Best League performance: 4th, Northern Counties East League Premier Division, 2013–14
- Best FA Cup performance: 1st qualifying round, 2013–14
- Best FA Vase performance: 2nd round, 2013–14
- Record attendance: 157 vs Scarborough Athletic, Northern Counties East League Premier Division, 2012–13
