= Frecheville Community Association F.C. =

Association football club in England

Frecheville Community Association
- Full name: Frecheville Community Association Football Club
- Dissolved: 2020
- Ground: Silkstone Road, Frecheville, Sheffield
- 2019–20: Sheffield & Hallamshire County Senior League Division Two, season suspended

Frecheville Community Association Football Club was a football club based in Frecheville, Sheffield, South Yorkshire.

== History ==
The club first came to prominence when they won the Hatchard League title in 1966, following this up with a Sheffield Association League win in 1968 – the same season they first entered the FA Amateur Cup.

After winning the Association League they joined the Yorkshire League, winning promotion from Division Two to Division One in their first season. They won the Sheffield & Hallamshire Senior Cup in 1973–74 and finished as Yorkshire League runners-up in 1974–75. A year later they finished bottom of the league, being relegated back to Division Two, but they did not stay out of the top flight for long, winning promotion back to Division One at the first time of asking. During the same 1976–77 season they made their FA Cup debut, but lost to Winterton Rangers in the preliminary round at Silkstone Road. A year later they reached the quarter-final of the FA Vase.

In 1982 the Yorkshire League merged with the Midland League to form the Northern Counties East League (NCEL), and Frecheville were entered into Division One South of the new competition. When the league was reorganised in 1985, the club was placed in Division Two, which it won in 1986–87, gaining promotion to Division One. After three seasons in the top division, the club left the NCEL to join the more local Sheffield & Hallamshire County Senior League (S&HCSL), entering at the S&HCSL's second tier, Division One.

Frecheville were crowned champions of Division One in 1991–92 and were promoted to the Premier Division. In their first season in the S&HCSL's top flight, the club won the league title, an achievement they repeated two years later. In 2002, just a year after finishing as runners-up, they were relegated to Division One when finishing bottom of the league, and in 2009 they were relegated again, to Division Two. They won the Division Two title at the first time of asking, and were promoted back to the Premier Division in 2012.

In 2016, they won their third S&HCSL title, but a year later the club was effectively disbanded when it moved to the Davys Sports Club and twice changed its name, first to Frecheville-Davys, and later to just Davys. A new Frecheville Community Association was formed in 2019, but lasted only the duration of the shortened 2019–20 season before disbanding again.

=== Season-by-season record ===
Season	Division	Level	Position	FA Cup	FA Amateur Cup	FA Vase	Notes
1958–59	East Derbyshire League	–		–	–	–	
1959–60	East Derbyshire League	–	9th/16	–	–	–	
1960–61	East Derbyshire League	–		–	–	–	
1961–62	East Derbyshire League	–		–	–	–	
1962–63	East Derbyshire League	–		–	–	–	
1964–65	Chesterfield & District League Division 1	–	1st	–	–	–	
1965–66	Hatchard League	–	1st/16	–	–	–	
1966–67	Sheffield Association League Division 2	–	1st/17	–	PR	–	Promoted
1967–68	Sheffield Association League Division 1	–	1st/16	–	PR	–	Transferred
1968–69	Yorkshire League Division 2	–	4th/17	–	PR	–	Promoted
1969–70	Yorkshire League Division 1	–	12th/18	–	4QR	–	
1970–71	Yorkshire League Division 1	–	11th/14	–	PR	–	
1971–72	Yorkshire League Division 1	–	11th/16	–	1QR	–	
1972–73	Yorkshire League Division 1	–	9th/16	–	2QR	–	
1973–74	Yorkshire League Division 1	–	10th/16	–	PR	–	
1974–75	Yorkshire League Division 1	–	2nd/16	–	–	1R	
1975–76	Yorkshire League Division 1	–	16th/16	–	–	1R	Relegated
1976–77	Yorkshire League Division 2	–	3rd/16	PR	–	PR	Promoted
1977–78	Yorkshire League Division 1	–	8th/16	–	–	QF	
1978–79	Yorkshire League Division 1	–	12th/16	–	–	2R	
1979–80	Yorkshire League Division 1	–	11th/16	–	–	4R	
1980–81	Yorkshire League Division 1	–	8th/16	–	–	2R	
1981–82	Yorkshire League Division 1	–	13th/16	–	–	4R	
1982–83	Northern Counties East League Division 1 South	–	4th/14	–	–	4R	
1983–84	Northern Counties East League Division 1 South	–	11th/14	–	–	2R	
1984–85	Northern Counties East League Division 1 South	–	10th/16	–	–	2R	
1985–86	Northern Counties East League Division 2	–	11th/16	–	–	2R	
1986–87	Northern Counties East League Division 2	–	1st/18	–	–	1R	Promoted
1987–88	Northern Counties East League Division 1	–	10th/16	–	–	EPR	
1988–89	Northern Counties East League Division 1	–	13th/16	–	–	EPR	
1989–90	Northern Counties East League Division 1	–	11th/15	–	–	PR	Transferred
1990–91	Sheffield & Hallamshire County Senior League Division 1	–	7th/13	–	–	–	
1991–92	Sheffield & Hallamshire County Senior League Division 1	–	1st/11	–	-	–	Promoted
1992–93	Sheffield & Hallamshire County Senior League Premier Division	–	1st/14	–	-	–	
1993–94	Sheffield & Hallamshire County Senior League Premier Division	–	4th/14	–	-	–	
1994–95	Sheffield & Hallamshire County Senior League Premier Division	–	1st/14	–	-	–	
1995–96	Sheffield & Hallamshire County Senior League Premier Division	–	6th/14	–	-	–	
1996–97	Sheffield & Hallamshire County Senior League Premier Division	–	3rd/14	–	-	–	
1997–98	Sheffield & Hallamshire County Senior League Premier Division	–	2nd/14	–	-	–	
1998–99	Sheffield & Hallamshire County Senior League Premier Division	–	4th/14	–	-	–	
1999–00	Sheffield & Hallamshire County Senior League Premier Division	–	8th/14	–	-	–	
2000–01	Sheffield & Hallamshire County Senior League Premier Division	–	2nd/14	–	-	–	
2001–02	Sheffield & Hallamshire County Senior League Premier Division	–	14th/14	–	-	–	Relegated
2002–03	Sheffield & Hallamshire County Senior League Division 1	–	10th/14	–	-	–	
2003–04	Sheffield & Hallamshire County Senior League Division 1	–	6th/13	–	-	–	
2004–05	Sheffield & Hallamshire County Senior League Division 1	12	10th/14	–	-	–	
2005–06	Sheffield & Hallamshire County Senior League Division 1	12	11th/13	–	-	–	
2006–07	Sheffield & Hallamshire County Senior League Division 1	12	5th/14	–	-	–	
2007–08	Sheffield & Hallamshire County Senior League Division 1	12	9th/13	–	-	–	
2008–09	Sheffield & Hallamshire County Senior League Division 1	12	13th/14	–	-	–	Relegated
2009–10	Sheffield & Hallamshire County Senior League Division 2	13	1st/12	–	-	–	Promoted
2010–11	Sheffield & Hallamshire County Senior League Division 1	12	7th/13	–	-	–	
2011–12	Sheffield & Hallamshire County Senior League Division 1	12	3rd/14	–	-	–	Promoted
2012–13	Sheffield & Hallamshire County Senior League Premier Division	11	13th/15	–	-	–	
2013–14	Sheffield & Hallamshire County Senior League Premier Division	11	11th/14	–	-	–	
2014–15	Sheffield & Hallamshire County Senior League Premier Division	11	13th/13	–	-	–	
2015–16	Sheffield & Hallamshire County Senior League Premier Division	11	1st/14	–	-	–	
2016–17	Sheffield & Hallamshire County Senior League Premier Division	11	3rd/14	–	-	–	
2019–20	Sheffield & Hallamshire County Senior League Division Two	13	–	–	-	Season abandoned	
Season	Division	Level	Position	FA Cup	FA Amateur Cup	FA Vase	Notes
Source: Football Club History Database

=== Notable former players ===
Players that have played in the Football League either before or after playing for the club –

- Ian Bowling
- Steve Thompson

== Ground ==
The club plays at the Davy Sports & Social Club in Sheffield.

== Honours ==
=== League ===
- Yorkshire League Division Two
  - Promoted: 1968–69, 1976–77
- Northern Counties East League Division Two
  - Promoted: 1986–87 (champions)
- Sheffield Association League
  - Champions: 1967–68
- Sheffield & Hallamshire County Senior League Premier Division
  - Champions: 1992–93, 1994–95, 2015–16
- Sheffield & Hallamshire County Senior League Division One
  - Promoted: 1991–92 (champions), 2011–12
- Sheffield & Hallamshire County Senior League Division Two
  - Promoted: 2009–10 (champions)
- Hatchard League
  - Champions: 1965–66

=== Cup ===
- Sheffield & Hallamshire Senior Cup
  - Winners: 1973–74
  - Runners-up: 1971–72, 1983–84
- Sheffield & Hallamshire County Senior League Cup
  - Winners: 1992–93, 1998–99, 1999–00

== Records ==
- Best FA Cup performance: Preliminary Round, 1976–77
- Best FA Amateur Cup performance: 4th Qualifying Round, 1969–70
- Best FA Vase performance: Quarter-final, 1977–78
