= Collingham F.C. (West Yorkshire) =

English football club

Collingham
- Dissolved: 1990

Collingham F.C. was an English football club based in Collingham, West Yorkshire.

== History ==
They were members of the Yorkshire Football League from 1975 to 1982 and the Northern Counties East League from 1982 to 1990.A successful period in their history under the management of Steve Alford and Tony Carter, winning Div 3 in 85/86 season. They also competed in the FA Vase from 1986 to 1989.
