= 1973–74 Yorkshire Football League =

The 1973–74 Yorkshire Football League was the 48th season in the history of the Yorkshire Football League, a football competition in England.

== Division One ==
Yorkshire Football League Division One
- Season: 1973–74
- Champions: Lincoln United
- Relegated: Barton Town; Kiveton Park; Rawmarsh Welfare; Woolley Miners Welfare
- Matches played: 240
- Goals scored: 812 (3.38 per match)

Division One featured 12 clubs which competed in the previous season, along with four new clubs, promoted from Division Two:

- Hatfield Main
- Leeds & Carnegie College
- Woolley Miners Welfare
- Worsbrough Bridge Miners Welfare Athletic

=== League table ===
Pos	Team	Pld	W	D	L	GF	GA	GD	Pts	Qualification or relegation
1	Lincoln United	30	19	4	7	61	33	+28	42	
2	Emley	30	19	4	7	54	35	+19	42	
3	Farsley Celtic	30	16	7	7	60	37	+23	39	
4	Mexborough Town	30	14	9	7	72	44	+28	37	
5	Hallam	30	13	8	9	66	64	+2	34	
6	Denaby United	30	13	7	10	44	42	+2	33	
7	Hatfield Main	30	11	8	11	62	56	+6	30	
8	Worsbrough Bridge Miners Welfare Athletic	30	12	6	12	53	58	−5	30	
9	Winterton Rangers	30	11	6	13	51	53	−2	28	
10	Frecheville Community Association	30	10	8	12	34	39	−5	28	
11	Leeds & Carnegie College	30	11	6	13	49	66	−17	28	
12	Yorkshire Amateur	30	11	5	14	44	45	−1	27	
13	Kiveton Park	30	9	5	16	43	53	−10	23	Relegated to Division Two
14	Barton Town	30	9	3	18	38	57	−19	21	Relegated to Division Two
15	Rawmarsh Welfare	30	7	6	17	37	54	−17	20	Relegated to Division Two
16	Woolley Miners Welfare	30	8	2	20	44	76	−32	18	Relegated to Division Two

Source: fchd
Rules for classification: 1) points; 2) goal difference; 3) number of goals scored.
The points system until the 1990–91 season: 2 points for a win, 1 point for a draw and 0 points for losing.

=== Map ===
Location of the clubs in the 1973–74 Yorkshire League Division One on a map of Yorkshire and the Humber

== Division Two ==
Yorkshire Football League Division Two
- Season: 1973–74
- Champions: Thackley
- Promoted: Guiseley; North Ferriby United; Ossett Albion; Thackley
- Relegated: Brook Sports; Norton Woodseats; Selby Town; Wombwell Sporting Association
- Matches played: 240
- Goals scored: 697 (2.9 per match)

Division Two featured nine clubs which competed in the previous season, along with seven new clubs.

- Clubs relegated from Division One:
  - Bridlington Town
  - Brook Sports
  - North Ferriby United
  - Selby Town
- Clubs promoted from Division Three:
  - Hall Road Rangers
  - Liversedge
  - Ossett Town

=== League table ===
Pos	Team	Pld	W	D	L	GF	GA	GD	Pts	Qualification or relegation
1	Thackley	30	21	5	4	58	19	+39	47	Promoted to Division One
2	Ossett Albion	30	19	9	2	66	27	+39	47	Promoted to Division One
3	North Ferriby United	30	17	8	5	61	34	+27	42	Promoted to Division One
4	Guiseley	30	16	7	7	52	33	+19	39	Promoted to Division One
5	Liversedge	30	15	7	8	45	33	+12	37	
6	Scarborough reserves	30	13	5	12	43	41	+2	31	
7	Leeds Ashley Road	30	12	6	12	41	47	−6	30	
8	Hall Road Rangers	30	8	11	11	40	45	−5	27	
9	Harrogate Town	30	9	9	12	37	43	−6	27	
10	Bridlington Town	30	10	6	14	46	53	−7	26	
11	Dinnington Athletic	30	10	5	15	37	53	−16	25	
12	Ossett Town	30	9	6	15	47	53	−6	24	
13	Selby Town	30	7	10	13	33	48	−15	24	Relegated to Division Three
14	Brook Sports	30	8	6	16	37	44	−7	22	Relegated to Division Three
15	Wombwell Sporting Association	30	7	3	20	24	61	−37	17	Relegated to Division Three
16	Norton Woodseats	30	5	5	20	30	63	−33	15	Relegated to Division Three

Source: fchd
Rules for classification: 1) points; 2) goal difference; 3) number of goals scored.
The points system until the 1990–91 season: 2 points for a win, 1 point for a draw and 0 points for losing.

=== Map ===
Location of the clubs in the 1973–74 Yorkshire League Division Two on a map of Yorkshire and the Humber

== Division Three ==
Yorkshire Football League Division Three
- Season: 1973–74
- Champions: Pickering Town
- Promoted: Bentley Victoria Welfare; Maltby Miners Welfare; Pickering Town; Redfearn National Glass
- Matches played: 240
- Goals scored: 922 (3.84 per match)

Division Three featured ten clubs which competed in the previous season, along with six new clubs.

- Clubs relegated from Division Two:
  - Stocksbridge Works
  - Thorne Colliery
- Plus:
  - Bentley Victoria Welfare, joined from the Doncaster & District Senior League
  - Maltby Miners Welfare, joined from the Sheffield Association League
  - Redfearn National Glass
  - Tadcaster Albion

=== League table ===
Pos	Team	Pld	W	D	L	GF	GA	GD	Pts	Qualification or relegation
1	Pickering Town	30	22	4	4	96	34	+62	48	Promoted to Division Two
2	Maltby Miners Welfare	30	17	10	3	60	27	+33	44	Promoted to Division Two
3	Bentley Victoria Welfare	30	19	6	5	76	39	+37	44	Promoted to Division Two
4	Redfearn National Glass	30	17	8	5	73	40	+33	42	Promoted to Division Two
5	Heeley Amateurs	30	16	4	10	75	45	+30	36	
6	St. John's College (York)	30	16	4	10	64	51	+13	36	
7	International Harvesters	30	13	7	10	56	42	+14	31 (Note: International Harvesters were deducted 2 points.)	
8	Stocksbridge Works	30	13	4	13	73	49	+24	30	
9	Sheffield Waterworks	30	11	7	12	47	57	−10	29	
10	Sheffield	30	12	4	14	62	52	+10	28	
11	Tadcaster Albion	30	13	2	15	54	54	0	28	
12	Worksop Town reserves	30	12	3	15	46	63	−17	27	Resigned from the league
13	Brodsworth Miners Welfare	30	5	8	17	33	66	−33	18	
14	Sheffield Polytechnic	30	3	10	17	33	67	−34	16	Resigned from the league
15	Blackburn Welfare	30	4	4	22	33	108	−75	12	
16	Thorne Colliery	28	3	3	22	41	128	−87	9	

Source: fchd
Rules for classification: 1) points; 2) goal difference; 3) number of goals scored.
The points system until the 1990–91 season: 2 points for a win, 1 point for a draw and 0 points for losing.

=== Map ===
St. John's College (York),Sheffield Polytechnic
Location of the clubs in the 1973–74 Yorkshire League Division Three on a map of Yorkshire and the Humber

== League Cup ==
1973–74 Yorkshire Football League League Cup
Tournament details
- Country: England

=== Final ===
Redfearn National Glass	3–0	Barton Town
