= 1972–73 Yorkshire Football League =

The 1972–73 Yorkshire Football League was the 47th season in the history of the Yorkshire Football League, a football competition in England.

== Division One ==
Yorkshire Football League Division One
- Season: 1972–73
- Champions: Mexborough Town
- Relegated: Bridlington Town; Brook Sports; North Ferriby United; Selby Town
- Matches played: 240
- Goals scored: 787 (3.28 per match)

Division One featured 12 clubs which competed in the previous season, along with four new clubs, promoted from Division Two:

- Barton Town
- Brook Sports
- Kiveton Park
- Yorkshire Amateur

=== League table ===
Pos	Team	Pld	W	D	L	GF	GA	GD	Pts	Qualification or relegation
1	Mexborough Town	30	17	10	3	65	32	+33	44	
2	Emley	30	14	11	5	52	29	+23	39	
3	Barton Town	30	18	2	10	54	33	+21	38	
4	Denaby United	30	16	5	9	56	37	+19	37	
5	Farsley Celtic	30	15	7	8	53	37	+16	37	
6	Lincoln United	30	13	7	10	39	37	+2	33	
7	Winterton Rangers	30	10	11	9	59	57	+2	31	
8	Yorkshire Amateur	30	11	8	11	30	33	−3	30	
9	Frecheville Community Association	30	9	10	11	37	37	0	28	
10	Hallam	30	11	6	13	60	67	−7	28	
11	Kiveton Park	30	11	6	13	50	71	−21	28	
12	Rawmarsh Welfare	30	10	7	13	51	53	−2	27	
13	North Ferriby United	30	9	6	15	52	46	+6	24	Relegated to Division Two
14	Brook Sports	30	7	7	16	51	82	−31	21	Relegated to Division Two
15	Selby Town	30	7	6	17	33	63	−30	20	Relegated to Division Two
16	Bridlington Town	30	4	7	19	45	73	−28	15	Relegated to Division Two

Source: fchd
Rules for classification: 1) points; 2) goal difference; 3) number of goals scored.
The points system until the 1990–91 season: 2 points for a win, 1 point for a draw and 0 points for losing.

=== Map ===
Location of the clubs in the 1972–73 Yorkshire League Division One on a map of Yorkshire and the Humber

== Division Two ==
Yorkshire Football League Division Two
- Season: 1972–73
- Champions: Leeds & Carnegie College
- Promoted: Hatfield Main; Leeds & Carnegie College; Woolley Miners Welfare; Worsbrough Bridge Miners Welfare Athletic
- Relegated: Stocksbridge Works; Thorne Colliery
- Matches played: 240
- Goals scored: 842 (3.51 per match)

Division Two featured nine clubs which competed in the previous season, along with seven new clubs.

- Clubs relegated from Division One:
  - Ossett Albion
  - Scarborough reserves
  - Thackley
- Clubs promoted from Division Three:
  - Harrogate Town
  - Leeds Ashley Road
  - Woolley Miners Welfare
  - Worsbrough Bridge Miners Welfare Athletic

=== League table ===
Pos	Team	Pld	W	D	L	GF	GA	GD	Pts	Qualification or relegation
1	Leeds & Carnegie College	30	21	1	8	73	30	+43	43	Promoted to Division One
2	Woolley Miners Welfare	30	19	4	7	85	59	+26	42	Promoted to Division One
3	Worsbrough Bridge Miners Welfare Athletic	30	18	5	7	74	39	+35	41	Promoted to Division One
4	Hatfield Main	30	18	2	10	66	37	+29	38	Promoted to Division One
5	Leeds Ashley Road	30	15	5	10	57	37	+20	35	
6	Harrogate Town	30	16	3	11	55	44	+11	35	
7	Ossett Albion	30	14	3	13	55	49	+6	31	
8	Scarborough reserves	30	14	2	14	64	52	+12	30	
9	Hull Brunswick	30	12	6	12	33	43	−10	30	Resigned from the league
10	Thackley	30	9	9	12	35	37	−2	27	
11	Wombwell Sporting Association	30	9	9	12	41	55	−14	27	
12	Guiseley	30	10	7	13	43	62	−19	27	
13	Norton Woodseats	30	11	3	16	54	73	−19	25	
14	Dinnington Athletic	30	7	9	14	41	48	−7	23	
15	Stocksbridge Works	30	8	5	17	36	54	−18	21	Relegated to Division Three
16	Thorne Colliery	30	1	3	26	30	123	−93	5	Relegated to Division Three

Source: fchd
Rules for classification: 1) points; 2) goal difference; 3) number of goals scored.
The points system until the 1990–91 season: 2 points for a win, 1 point for a draw and 0 points for losing.

=== Map ===
Location of the clubs in the 1972–73 Yorkshire League Division Two on a map of Yorkshire and the Humber

== Division Three ==
Yorkshire Football League Division Three
- Season: 1972–73
- Champions: Hall Road Rangers
- Promoted: Hall Road Rangers; Liversedge; Ossett Town
- Matches played: 240
- Goals scored: 794 (3.31 per match)

Division Three featured ten clubs which competed in the previous season, along with six new clubs.

- Clubs relegated from Division Two:
  - Brodsworth Miners Welfare
  - Heeley Amateurs
- Plus:
  - Liversedge, joined from the West Riding League
  - Pickering Town, joined from the York Football League
  - Sheffield Polytechnic
  - Worksop Town reserves

=== League table ===
Pos	Team	Pld	W	D	L	GF	GA	GD	Pts	Qualification or relegation
1	Hall Road Rangers	30	15	11	4	56	37	+19	41	Promoted to Division Two
2	Liversedge	30	18	4	8	63	35	+28	40	Promoted to Division Two
3	Ossett Town	30	16	6	8	49	35	+14	38	Promoted to Division Two
4	Bradford Park Avenue reserves	30	16	5	9	68	43	+25	37	Resigned from the league
5	Pickering Town	30	15	7	8	61	45	+16	37	
6	Worksop Town reserves	30	15	6	9	55	42	+13	36	
7	Blackburn Welfare	30	13	9	8	62	48	+14	35	
8	Sheffield	30	13	9	8	55	45	+10	35	
9	Harrogate Railway Athletic	30	11	11	8	36	30	+6	33	Resigned to the Harrogate & District League
10	International Harvesters	30	11	7	12	55	48	+7	29	
11	Sheffield Waterworks	30	8	7	15	43	63	−20	23	
12	St. John's College (York)	30	8	5	17	39	70	−31	21	
13	Retford Town reserves	30	9	2	19	44	66	−22	20	Resigned from the league
14	Brodsworth Miners Welfare	30	5	9	16	32	50	−18	19	
15	Heeley Amateurs	30	8	2	20	44	77	−33	18	
16	Sheffield Polytechnic	30	6	6	18	32	60	−28	18	

Source: fchd
Rules for classification: 1) points; 2) goal difference; 3) number of goals scored.
The points system until the 1990–91 season: 2 points for a win, 1 point for a draw and 0 points for losing.

=== Map ===
St. John's College (York)Sheffield Polytechnic
Location of the clubs in the 1972–73 Yorkshire League Division Three on a map of Yorkshire and the Humber

== League Cup ==
1972–73 Yorkshire Football League League Cup
Tournament details
- Country: England

=== Final ===
Mexborough Town	2–1	Hatfield Main
