= 1974–75 Yorkshire Football League =

The 1974–75 Yorkshire Football League was the 49th season in the history of the Yorkshire Football League, a football competition in England.

== Division One ==
Yorkshire Football League Division One
- Season: 1974–75
- Champions: Ossett Albion
- Relegated: Denaby United; Guiseley; Yorkshire Amateur
- Matches played: 240
- Goals scored: 718 (2.99 per match)

Division One featured 12 clubs which competed in the previous season, along with four new clubs, promoted from Division Two:

- Guiseley
- North Ferriby United
- Ossett Albion
- Thackley

=== League table ===
Pos	Team	Pld	W	D	L	GF	GA	GD	Pts	Qualification or relegation
1	Ossett Albion	30	19	5	6	59	34	+25	43	
2	Frecheville Community Association	30	18	6	6	50	29	+21	42	
3	Thackley	30	13	13	4	35	21	+14	39	
4	Farsley Celtic	30	14	9	7	32	31	+1	37	
5	Emley	30	11	11	8	55	39	+16	33	
6	Lincoln United	30	12	7	11	45	33	+12	31	
7	Hallam	30	12	7	11	50	45	+5	31	
8	Winterton Rangers	30	10	9	11	49	60	−11	29	
9	Leeds & Carnegie College	30	10	8	12	52	57	−5	28	
10	North Ferriby United	30	10	7	13	48	48	0	27	
11	Hatfield Main	30	9	8	13	53	53	0	26	
12	Worsbrough Bridge Miners Welfare Athletic	30	8	9	13	41	58	−17	25	
13	Guiseley	30	8	9	13	35	54	−19	25	Relegated to Division Two
14	Mexborough Town	30	6	12	12	41	51	−10	24	Resigned and continued to compete in the Midland League
15	Denaby United	30	4	14	12	44	55	−11	22	Relegated to Division Two
16	Yorkshire Amateur	30	5	8	17	29	50	−21	18	Relegated to Division Two

Source: fchd
Rules for classification: 1) points; 2) goal difference; 3) number of goals scored.
The points system until the 1990–91 season: 2 points for a win, 1 point for a draw and 0 points for losing.

=== Map ===
Location of the clubs in the 1974–75 Yorkshire League Division One on a map of Yorkshire and the Humber

== Division Two ==
Yorkshire Football League Division Two
- Season: 1974–75
- Champions: Bridlington Town
- Promoted: Bridlington Town; Maltby Miners Welfare; Pickering Town; Redfearn National Glass
- Relegated: Ossett Town; Rawmarsh Welfare; Scarborough reserves
- Matches played: 210
- Goals scored: 589 (2.8 per match)

Division Two featured eight clubs which competed in the previous season, along with eight new clubs.

- Clubs relegated from Division One:
  - Barton Town
  - Kiveton Park
  - Rawmarsh Welfare
  - Woolley Miners Welfare
- Clubs promoted from Division Three:
  - Bentley Victoria Welfare
  - Maltby Miners Welfare
  - Pickering Town
  - Redfearn National Glass

=== League table ===
Pos	Team	Pld	W	D	L	GF	GA	GD	Pts	Qualification or relegation
1	Bridlington Town	28	15	9	4	43	26	+17	39	Promoted to Division One
2	Pickering Town	28	14	9	5	55	32	+23	37	Promoted to Division One
3	Redfearn National Glass	28	14	7	7	43	31	+12	35	Promoted to Division One
4	Maltby Miners Welfare	28	15	4	9	43	32	+11	34	Promoted to Division One
5	Liversedge	28	14	5	9	56	32	+24	33	
6	Barton Town	28	11	6	11	41	41	0	28	
7	Kiveton Park	28	9	9	10	37	37	0	27	
8	Bentley Victoria Welfare	28	9	8	11	38	44	−6	26	
9	Hall Road Rangers	28	7	11	10	33	45	−12	25	
10	Harrogate Town	28	8	8	12	41	37	+4	24	
11	Woolley Miners Welfare	28	6	12	10	34	47	−13	24	
12	Leeds Ashley Road	28	9	5	14	32	37	−5	23	
13	Scarborough reserves	28	7	9	12	29	44	−15	23	Relegated to Division Three
14	Rawmarsh Welfare	28	6	9	13	37	55	−18	21	Relegated to Division Three
15	Ossett Town	28	6	9	13	27	49	−22	19 (Note: Ossett Town were deducted 2 points.)	Relegated to Division Three
16	Dinnington Athletic	0	0	0	0	0	0	0	0	Club folded, record expunged

Source: fchd
Rules for classification: 1) points; 2) goal difference; 3) number of goals scored.
The points system until the 1990–91 season: 2 points for a win, 1 point for a draw and 0 points for losing.

=== Map ===
Location of the clubs in the 1974–75 Yorkshire League Division Two on a map of Yorkshire and the Humber

== Division Three ==
Yorkshire Football League Division Three
- Season: 1974–75
- Champions: Stocksbridge Works
- Promoted: Norton Woodseats; Selby Town; Stocksbridge Works; Tadcaster Albion
- Matches played: 240
- Goals scored: 863 (3.6 per match)

Division Three featured ten clubs which competed in the previous season, along with six new clubs.

- Clubs relegated from Division Two:
  - Brook Sports
  - Norton Woodseats
  - Selby Town
  - Wombwell Sporting Association
- Plus:
  - BSC Parkgate, joined from the Sheffield Association League
  - York Railway Institute

=== League table ===
Pos	Team	Pld	W	D	L	GF	GA	GD	Pts	Qualification or relegation
1	Stocksbridge Works	30	25	2	3	91	28	+63	52	Promoted to Division Two
2	Selby Town	30	20	6	4	77	31	+46	46	Promoted to Division Two
3	Tadcaster Albion	30	20	6	4	70	37	+33	46	Promoted to Division Two
4	Norton Woodseats	30	19	6	5	82	38	+44	44	Promoted to Division Two
5	Sheffield	30	15	5	10	58	45	+13	35	
6	Thorne Colliery	30	13	7	10	59	47	+12	33	
7	St. John's College (York)	30	13	6	11	62	47	+15	32	
8	Wombwell Sporting Association	30	13	4	13	44	61	−17	30	
9	BSC Parkgate	30	10	9	11	58	49	+9	29	
10	Heeley Amateurs	30	8	7	15	47	65	−18	23	
11	Brook Sports	30	9	4	17	41	59	−18	22	
12	International Harvesters	30	6	9	15	29	48	−19	21	Resigned to the Doncaster & District Senior League
13	Sheffield Waterworks	30	7	7	16	27	62	−35	21	
14	York Railway Institute	30	7	4	19	42	78	−36	18	
15	Brodsworth Miners Welfare	30	7	1	22	45	82	−37	15	
16	Blackburn Welfare	30	5	3	22	31	86	−55	13	Resigned from the league

Source: fchd
Rules for classification: 1) points; 2) goal difference; 3) number of goals scored.
The points system until the 1990–91 season: 2 points for a win, 1 point for a draw and 0 points for losing.

=== Map ===
St. John's College (York)
Location of the clubs in the 1974–75 Yorkshire League Division Three on a map of Yorkshire and the Humber

== League Cup ==
1974–75 Yorkshire Football League League Cup
Tournament details
- Country: England

=== Final ===
North Ferriby United	2–0	Lincoln United
