= 1971–72 Yorkshire Football League =

The 1971–72 Yorkshire Football League was the 46th season in the history of the Yorkshire Football League, a football competition in England.

== Division One ==
Yorkshire Football League Division One
- Season: 1971–72
- Champions: Winterton Rangers
- Relegated: Ossett Albion; Scarborough reserves Thackley
- Matches played: 240
- Goals scored: 682 (2.84 per match)

Division One featured 12 clubs which competed in the previous season, along with four new clubs, promoted from Division Two:

- Emley
- North Ferriby United
- Scarborough reserves
- Thackley

=== League table ===
Pos	Team	Pld	W	D	L	GF	GA	GD	Pts	Qualification or relegation
1	Winterton Rangers	30	20	5	5	60	30	+30	45	
2	Farsley Celtic	30	16	7	7	43	28	+15	39	
3	Bridlington Town	30	12	9	9	35	28	+7	33	
4	Mexborough Town	30	14	5	11	49	43	+6	33	
5	Denaby United	30	12	9	9	52	47	+5	33	
6	North Ferriby United	30	14	5	11	53	49	+4	33	
7	Selby Town	30	12	6	12	41	45	−4	30	
8	Emley	30	12	5	13	38	40	−2	29	
9	Hallam	30	12	4	14	48	68	−20	28	
10	Lincoln United	30	10	6	14	39	41	−2	26	
11	Frecheville Community Association	30	10	6	14	36	46	−10	26	
12	Rawmarsh Welfare	30	9	7	14	42	43	−1	25	
13	Thackley	30	6	13	11	35	38	−3	25	Relegated to Division Two
14	Scarborough reserves	30	10	5	15	44	49	−5	25	Relegated to Division Two
15	Bridlington Trinity	30	9	7	14	33	43	−10	25	Transferred to the Midland League
16	Ossett Albion	30	9	7	14	34	44	−10	25	Relegated to Division Two

Source: fchd
Rules for classification: 1) points; 2) goal difference; 3) number of goals scored.
The points system until the 1990–91 season: 2 points for a win, 1 point for a draw and 0 points for losing.

=== Map ===
Location of the clubs in the 1971–72 Yorkshire League Division One on a map of Yorkshire and the Humber

== Division Two ==
Yorkshire Football League Division Two
- Season: 1971–72
- Champions: Barton Town
- Promoted: Barton Town; Brook Sports; Kiveton Park; Yorkshire Amateur
- Relegated: Brodsworth Miners Welfare; Heeley Amateurs
- Matches played: 210
- Goals scored: 696 (3.31 per match)

Division Two featured nine clubs which competed in the previous season, along with six new clubs.

- Clubs relegated from Division One:
  - Barton Town
  - Wombwell Sporting Association
- Clubs promoted from Division Three:
  - Brook Sports
  - Guiseley
  - Leeds & Carnegie College
  - Stocksbridge Works

=== League table ===
Pos	Team	Pld	W	D	L	GF	GA	GD	Pts	Qualification or relegation
1	Barton Town	28	20	5	3	89	28	+61	45	Promoted to Division One
2	Yorkshire Amateur	28	17	8	3	60	28	+32	42	Promoted to Division One
3	Kiveton Park	28	16	10	2	70	34	+36	42	Promoted to Division One
4	Brook Sports	28	13	7	8	53	47	+6	33	Promoted to Division One
5	Leeds & Carnegie College	28	12	7	9	46	35	+11	31	
6	Hull Brunswick	28	11	7	10	48	32	+16	29	
7	Hatfield Main	28	12	5	11	42	36	+6	29	
8	Guiseley	28	10	6	12	45	43	+2	26	
9	Stocksbridge Works	28	9	8	11	35	40	−5	26	
10	Wombwell Sporting Association	28	8	8	12	37	41	−4	24	
11	Thorne Colliery	28	8	6	14	46	79	−33	22	
12	Dinnington Athletic	28	7	7	14	34	67	−33	21	
13	Norton Woodseats	28	6	7	15	33	56	−23	19	
14	Heeley Amateurs	28	7	5	16	32	66	−34	19	Relegated to Division Three
15	Brodsworth Miners Welfare	28	4	4	20	26	64	−38	12	Relegated to Division Three

Source: fchd
Rules for classification: 1) points; 2) goal difference; 3) number of goals scored.
The points system until the 1990–91 season: 2 points for a win, 1 point for a draw and 0 points for losing.

=== Map ===
Location of the clubs in the 1971–72 Yorkshire League Division Two on a map of Yorkshire and the Humber

== Division Three ==
Yorkshire Football League Division Three
- Season: 1971–72
- Champions: Leeds Ashley Road
- Promoted: Harrogate Town; Leeds Ashley Road; Woolley Miners Welfare; Worsbrough Bridge Miners Welfare Athletic
- Matches played: 182
- Goals scored: 638 (3.51 per match)

Division Three featured ten clubs which competed in the previous season, along with four new clubs:

- Blackburn Welfare
- Retford Town reserves
- Woolley Miners Welfare
- Worsbrough Bridge Miners Welfare Athletic, joined from the Sheffield Association League

=== League table ===
Pos	Team	Pld	W	D	L	GF	GA	GD	Pts	Qualification or relegation
1	Leeds Ashley Road	26	16	7	3	58	21	+37	39	Promoted to Division Two
2	Harrogate Town	26	15	6	5	54	27	+27	36	Promoted to Division Two
3	Worsbrough Bridge Miners Welfare Athletic	26	17	1	8	75	38	+37	35	Promoted to Division Two
4	Woolley Miners Welfare	26	15	5	6	63	42	+21	35	Promoted to Division Two
5	St. John's College (York)	26	16	2	8	49	49	0	34	
6	Ossett Town	26	12	4	10	44	35	+9	28	
7	Sheffield	26	12	4	10	39	39	0	28	
8	Bradford Park Avenue reserves	26	11	4	11	44	36	+8	26	
9	International Harvesters	26	8	7	11	46	42	+4	23	
10	Hall Road Rangers	26	8	6	12	40	41	−1	22	
11	Harrogate Railway Athletic	26	8	5	13	29	40	−11	21	
12	Retford Town reserves	26	5	4	17	36	65	−29	14	
13	Blackburn Welfare	26	5	4	17	35	64	−29	14	
14	Sheffield Waterworks	26	4	1	21	26	99	−73	9	

Source: fchd
Rules for classification: 1) points; 2) goal difference; 3) number of goals scored.
The points system until the 1990–91 season: 2 points for a win, 1 point for a draw and 0 points for losing.

=== Map ===
St. John's College (York)
Location of the clubs in the 1971–72 Yorkshire League Division Three on a map of Yorkshire and the Humber

== League Cup ==
1971–72 Yorkshire Football League League Cup
Tournament details
- Country: England

=== Final ===
Denaby United	1–0	Barton Town	Belle Vue
