= 1970–71 Yorkshire Football League =

The 1970–71 Yorkshire Football League was the 45th season in the history of the Yorkshire Football League, a football competition in England. This season the league expanded up to three divisions.

== Division One ==
Yorkshire Football League Division One
- Season: 1970–71
- Champions: Lincoln United
- Relegated: Barton Town; Wombwell Sporting Association
- Matches played: 182
- Goals scored: 595 (3.27 per match)

Division One featured 12 clubs which competed in the previous season, along with two new clubs:

- Barton Town, transferred from the Midland League
- Winterton Rangers, joined from the Lincolnshire Football League

=== League table ===
Pos	Team	Pld	W	D	L	GF	GA	GD	Pts	Qualification or relegation
1	Lincoln United	26	16	7	3	56	26	+30	39	
2	Farsley Celtic	26	13	9	4	41	25	+16	35	
3	Rawmarsh Welfare	26	13	8	5	49	30	+19	34	
4	Mexborough Town	26	12	7	7	56	40	+16	31	
5	Hallam	26	13	5	8	49	42	+7	31	
6	Bridlington Town	26	10	7	9	43	35	+8	27	
7	Denaby United	26	11	4	11	44	37	+7	26	
8	Ossett Albion	26	8	8	10	30	36	−6	24	
9	Bridlington Trinity	26	9	4	13	43	50	−7	22	
10	Winterton Rangers	26	8	6	12	40	48	−8	22	
11	Frecheville Community Association	26	8	6	12	41	51	−10	22	
12	Selby Town	26	7	5	14	42	54	−12	19	
13	Barton Town	26	5	9	12	41	65	−24	19	Relegated to Division Two
14	Wombwell Sporting Association	26	3	7	16	20	56	−36	13	Relegated to Division Two

Source: fchd
Rules for classification: 1) points; 2) goal difference; 3) number of goals scored.
The points system until the 1990–91 season: 2 points for a win, 1 point for a draw and 0 points for losing.

=== Map ===
Location of the clubs in the 1970–71 Yorkshire League Division One on a map of Yorkshire and the Humber

== Division Two ==
Yorkshire Football League Division Two
- Season: 1970–71
- Champions: North Ferriby United
- Promoted: Emley; North Ferriby United; Scarborough reserves Thackley
- Matches played: 182
- Goals scored: 627 (3.45 per match)

Division Two featured eight clubs which competed in the previous season, along with six new clubs, relegated from Division One:

- Hatfield Main
- Heeley Amateurs
- Kiveton Park
- Norton Woodseats
- Swallownest Miners Welfare
- Thackley

=== League table ===
Pos	Team	Pld	W	D	L	GF	GA	GD	Pts	Qualification or relegation
1	North Ferriby United	26	17	6	3	69	19	+50	40	Promoted to Division One
2	Thackley	26	16	6	4	55	21	+34	38	Promoted to Division One
3	Scarborough reserves	26	16	3	7	67	38	+29	35	Promoted to Division One
4	Emley	26	14	7	5	51	29	+22	35	Promoted to Division One
5	Hull Brunswick	26	13	7	6	46	24	+22	33	
6	Hatfield Main	26	14	4	8	46	36	+10	32	
7	Dinnington Athletic	26	11	3	12	42	37	+5	25	
8	Norton Woodseats	26	9	3	14	45	51	−6	21	
9	Kiveton Park	26	9	3	14	41	62	−21	21	
10	Yorkshire Amateur	26	7	4	15	42	51	−9	18	
11	Heeley Amateurs	26	6	6	14	33	64	−31	18	
12	Thorne Colliery	26	5	6	15	35	69	−34	16	
13	Brodsworth Miners Welfare	26	7	2	17	24	55	−31	16	
14	Swallownest Miners Welfare	26	6	4	16	31	71	−40	16	Resigned from the league

Source: fchd
Rules for classification: 1) points; 2) goal difference; 3) number of goals scored.
The points system until the 1990–91 season: 2 points for a win, 1 point for a draw and 0 points for losing.

=== Map ===
Location of the clubs in the 1970–71 Yorkshire League Division Two on a map of Yorkshire and the Humber

== Division Three ==
Yorkshire Football League Division Three
- Season: 1970–71
- Champions: Stocksbridge Works
- Promoted: Brook Sports; Guiseley; Leeds & Carnegie College; Stocksbridge Works
- Matches played: 210
- Goals scored: 753 (3.59 per match)

The division was formed by nine clubs relegated from Division Two and six new clubs.

- Clubs relegated from Division Two:
  - Firth Vickers
  - Guiseley
  - Hall Road Rangers
  - Harrogate Railway Athletic
  - Harrogate Town
  - Leeds Ashley Road
  - Ossett Town
  - Sheffield
  - Stocksbridge Works
- Plus:
  - Bradford Park Avenue reserves
  - Brook Sports
  - International Harvesters, joined from the Doncaster & District Senior League
  - Leeds & Carnegie College, new club
  - Sheffield Waterworks, joined from the Sheffield Association League
  - St. John's College (York)

=== League table ===
Pos	Team	Pld	W	D	L	GF	GA	GD	Pts	Qualification or relegation
1	Stocksbridge Works	28	19	5	4	74	38	+36	43	Promoted to Division Two
2	Brook Sports	28	16	8	4	60	46	+14	40	Promoted to Division Two
3	Leeds & Carnegie College	28	15	5	8	69	32	+37	35	Promoted to Division Two
4	Guiseley	28	14	5	9	68	52	+16	33	Promoted to Division Two
5	Harrogate Railway Athletic	28	13	5	10	42	40	+2	31	
6	Sheffield	28	12	6	10	61	52	+9	30	
7	St. John's College (York)	28	9	10	9	45	37	+8	28	
8	Ossett Town	28	10	8	10	48	44	+4	28	
9	Leeds Ashley Road	28	10	7	11	48	41	+7	27	
10	Hall Road Rangers	28	11	4	13	49	68	−19	26	
11	International Harvesters	28	9	7	12	50	52	−2	25	
12	Harrogate Town	28	8	6	14	34	45	−11	22	
13	Bradford Park Avenue reserves	28	8	5	15	39	53	−14	21	
14	Firth Vickers	28	8	3	17	43	72	−29	19	Resigned to the Sheffield Association League
15	Sheffield Waterworks	28	3	6	19	23	81	−58	12	

Source: fchd
Rules for classification: 1) points; 2) goal difference; 3) number of goals scored.
The points system until the 1990–91 season: 2 points for a win, 1 point for a draw and 0 points for losing.

=== Map ===
St. John's College (York)
Location of the clubs in the 1970–71 Yorkshire League Division Three on a map of Yorkshire and the Humber

== League Cup ==
1970–71 Yorkshire Football League League Cup
Tournament details
- Country: England

=== Final ===
Lincoln United	3–1	Mexborough Town
