= Worsbrough Bridge Athletic F.C. =

Association football club in England

Coordinates: 53°31′33.70″N 1°28′18.36″W

Worsbrough Bridge Athletic
- Full name: Worsbrough Bridge Athletic Football Club
- Nickname: The Briggers
- Founded: 1923
- Ground: Park Road, Worsbrough Bridge
- Capacity: 2,000 (175 seated)
- Chairman: Luke Forgione & Darren Jones
- Manager: Conor Glavin
- League: Northern Counties East League Premier Division
- 2025–26: Northern Counties East League Division One, 2nd of 22 (promoted via play-offs)
- Website: worsbroughbridgeafc.co.uk
Home colours

Worsbrough Bridge Athletic Football Club is a football club based in Worsbrough Bridge, Barnsley, South Yorkshire, England. They are currently members of the Northern Counties East League Premier Division and play at Park Road.

== History ==
The club was formed as Worsbrough Bridge St James in 1923, before being renamed Worsbrough Bridge Athletic. After playing in the Barnsley Junior League, the club joined the Barnsley Nelson League in 1939. They were runners-up in the league in 1943–44 and champions the following season. They returned to the Junior League in 1947, before switching to the Barnsley Association League in 1949. They were league champions in 1950–51 and 1952–53 and League Cup winners in 1956–57 and 1958–59. The club were renamed Worsbrough Bridge Miners Welfare & Athletic in 1961 after entering into partnership with the local Miners Welfare scheme, after which they joined Division Two of the Sheffield Association League in 1963.

Worsbrough Bridge were promoted to Division One at the end of their first season in the Sheffield Association League, and were Division One champions in 1965–66 and 1969–70. In 1971 the club moved up to Division Three of the Yorkshire League. After finishing third in their first season in the league, they were promoted to Division Three. Another third-placed finish in 1972–73 saw them earn a second successive promotion to Division One. They finished second-from-bottom of Division One in 1975–76 and were relegated to Division Two. After finishing third-from-bottom of Division Two in 1978–79 the club were relegated to Division Three.

When the Yorkshire League merged with the Midland League to form the Northern Counties East League in 1982, The Brigg were placed in Division Two South. League reorganisation in 1984 saw them moved to Division One Central, before further reorganisation saw them placed in Division Three for the 1985–86 season. They went on to finish as runners-up in the division, earning promotion to Division Two. The club were Division Two runners-up in 1990–91 and were promoted to Division One. They were Division One runners-up in 1990–91.

In 2006 the club were renamed Worsbrough Bridge Athletic. They finished bottom of Division One in 2009–10 and 2015–16 but were not relegated. In 2025–26 the club were runners-up in Division One, qualifying for the promotion play-offs. After beating Leeds UFCA 3–0 in the semi-finals, they defeated Wakefield 2–0 in the final to earn promotion to the Premier Division.

=== Season-by-season record ===
Season	Division	Level	Position	FA Cup	FA Amateur Cup	FA Vase	Notes
1932–33	Barnsley Junior League	–		–	–	–	
1933–34	Barnsley Junior League	–		–	–	–	
1934–35	Barnsley Junior League	–		–	–	–	
1935–36	Barnsley Junior League	–		–	–	–	
1936–37	Barnsley Junior League	–	3/7	–	–	–	
1937–38	Barnsley Junior League	–	3/12	–	–	–	
1938–39	Barnsley Junior League	–	7/11	–	–	–	
1939–40	Barnsley Nelson League	–	–	–	–	–	Withdrew from league
1943–44	Barnsley Nelson League	–	2/11	–	–	–	
1944–45	Barnsley Nelson League	–	1/9	–	–	–	Lost league play-off
1945–46	Barnsley Nelson League	–	4/12	–	–	–	
1946–47	Barnsley Nelson League	–		–	–	–	
1947–48	Barnsley Junior League	–	3/9	–	–	–	
1948–49	Barnsley Junior League	–		–	–	–	League champions
1949–50	Barnsley Association League	–		–	–	-	Lost league play-off
1950–51	Barnsley Association League	–	1/13	–	–	–	League champions
1951–52	Barnsley Association League	–		–	–	–	
1952–53	Barnsley Association League	–		–	–	–	League champions (won play-off)
1953–54	Barnsley Association League	–		–	–	–	
1954–55	Barnsley Association League	–	1/9	–	–	–	Lost league play-off
1955–56	Barnsley Association League	–		–	–	–	
1956–57	Barnsley Association League	–	1/8	–	–	–	Lost league play-off
1957–58	Barnsley Association League	–	2/13	–	–	–	
1958–59	Barnsley Association League	–	1/12	–	–	–	Lost league play-off
1959–60	Barnsley Association League	–	1/11	–	–	–	Lost league play-off
1960–61	Barnsley Association League	–	2/9	–	–	–	
1961–62	Barnsley Association League	–	3/12	–	–	–	
1962–63	Sheffield Association League Division Two	–		–	–	–	Promoted
1963–64	Sheffield Association League Division One	–	7/16	–	–	–	
1964–65	Sheffield Association League Division One	–		–	–	–	
1965–66	Sheffield Association League Division One	–	1/16	–	–	–	League champions
1966–67	Sheffield Association League Division One	–	4/18	–	–	–	
1967–68	Sheffield Association League Division One	–		–	–	–	
1968–69	Sheffield Association League Division One	–		–	–	–	
1969–70	Sheffield Association League Division One	–	1/17	–	–	–	
1970–71	Sheffield Association League Division One	–		–	1QR	–	
1971–72	Yorkshire League Division Three	–	3/14	–	3QR	–	Promoted
1972–73	Yorkshire League Division Two	–	3/16	–	3QR	–	Promoted
1973–74	Yorkshire League Division One	–	8/16	–	2QR	–	
1974–75	Yorkshire League Division One	–	12/16	–	–	1R	
1975–76	Yorkshire League Division One	–	15/16	–	–	PR	Relegated
1976–77	Yorkshire League Division Two	–	9/16	–	–	–	
1977–78	Yorkshire League Division Two	–	9/15	–	–	–	
1978–79	Yorkshire League Division Two	–	14/16	–	–	–	Relegated
1979–80	Yorkshire League Division Three	–	7/14	1QR	–	–	
1980–81	Yorkshire League Division Three	–	7/16	1QR	–	–	
1981–82	Yorkshire League Division Three	–	4/15	1QR	–	–	
1982–83	Northern Counties East League Division Two South	–	3/14	–	–	–	
1983–84	Northern Counties East League Division Two South	–	7/13	–	–	PR	
1984–85	Northern Counties East League Division One Central	–	13/16	–	–	EPR	
1985–86	Northern Counties East League Division Three	–	2/14	–	–	–	Promoted
1986–87	Northern Counties East League Division Two	–	6/18	–	–	EPR	
1987–88	Northern Counties East League Division Two	–	5/15	–	–	EPR	
1988–89	Northern Counties East League Division Two	–	4/14	–	–	–	
1989–90	Northern Counties East League Division Two	–	11/14	–	–	EPR	
1990–91	Northern Counties East League Division Two	–	2/13	–	–	3R	Promoted
1991–92	Northern Counties East League Division One	–	10/16	–	–	EPR	
1992–93	Northern Counties East League Division One	–	10/14	–	–	2R	
1993–94	Northern Counties East League Division One	–	8/15	–	–	EPR	
1994–95	Northern Counties East League Division One	–	2/16	-	–	1R	
1995–96	Northern Counties East League Division One	–	11/16	–	–	1QR	
1996–97	Northern Counties East League Division One	–	10/15	–	–	1R	
1997–98	Northern Counties East League Division One	–	7/15	–	–	2QR	
1998–99	Northern Counties East League Division One	–	6/13	–	–	1R	
1999–2000	Northern Counties East League Division One	–	10/16	–	–	1QR	
2000–01	Northern Counties East League Division One	–	11/16	–	–	2QR	
2001–02	Northern Counties East League Division One	–	3/16	–	–	2QR	
2002–03	Northern Counties East League Division One	–	14/17	1QR	–	2QR	
2003–04	Northern Counties East League Division One	–	15/18	–	–	1R	
2004–05	Northern Counties East League Division One	10	15/16	–	–	1QR	
2005–06	Northern Counties East League Division One	10	9/16	–	–	2QR	
2006–07	Northern Counties East League Division One	10	8/17	–	–	1R	
2007–08	Northern Counties East League Division One	10	15/17	–	–	1QR	
2008–09	Northern Counties East League Division One	10	16/19	–	–	2QR	
2009–10	Northern Counties East League Division One	10	18/18	–	–	1R	
2010–11	Northern Counties East League Division One	10	12/20	–	–	2QR	
2011–12	Northern Counties East League Division One	10	11/20	–	–	2QR	
2012–13	Northern Counties East League Division One	10	9/22	–	–	1QR	
2013–14	Northern Counties East League Division One	10	10/22	-	–	2QR	
2014–15	Northern Counties East League Division One	10	16/22	–	–	2QR	
2015–16	Northern Counties East League Division One	10	21/21	–	–	1QR	
2016–17	Northern Counties East League Division One	10	20/22	–	–	1QR	
2017–18	Northern Counties East League Division One	10	19/22	–	–	1QR	
2018–19	Northern Counties East League Division One	10	7/20	–	–	2QR	
2019–20	Northern Counties East League Division One	10	–	–	-	2QR	Season abandoned due to COVID-19 pandemic
2020–21	Northern Counties East League Division One	10	–	–	-	1QR	Season abandoned due to COVID-19 pandemic
2021–22	Northern Counties East League Division One	10	9/21	–	–	1QR	
2022–23	Northern Counties East League Division One	10	15/20	–	–	–	
2023–24	Northern Counties East League Division One	10	15/23	–	–	1QR	
2024–25	Northern Counties East League Division One	10	6/22	–	–	2QR	
2025–26	Northern Counties East League Division One	10		–	–	1QR	Promoted (play-offs)
Source: Football Club History Database

== Ground ==
The club began playing at Park Road before World War II, but left in 1947. They returned after purchasing the ground in 1953. After entering into partnership with the Miners Welfare scheme, the ground was developed with new changing rooms and a new hall during the early 1960s. In the early 1970s a new stand was built. A record attendance of 1,603 was set for an FA Amateur Cup match against Blyth Spartans in 1971, although the real figure may have been closer to 2,500. Floodlights were installed in 1993.

== Honours ==
- Sheffield Association League
  - Division One champions 1965–66, 1969–70
  - League Cup winners 1965–66
- Barnsley Association League
  - Champions 1950–51, 1952–53
- Barnsley Junior League
  - Champions 1948–49

== Records ==
- Best FA Cup performance: First qualifying round, 1978–79, 1979–80, 1980–81, 2002–03
- Best FA Amateur Cup performance: Third qualifying round, 1971–72, 1972–73
- Best FA Vase performance: Third round, 1990–91
- Record attendance: 1,617 vs Wakefield, Northern Counties East League Division One play-off final, 25 April 2026

== See also ==
- Worsbrough Bridge Athletic F.C. players
- Worsbrough Bridge Athletic F.C. managers
