= Bernard Waring =

English footballer

Senior career*
| Years | Team | Apps | (Gls) |
- Kiveton Park
| 1929 | Southend United | 1 | (0) |
- Worksop Town
- *Club domestic league appearances and goals

Bernard Waring was an English footballer who played for Southend United.
