= 1969–70 FA Cup qualifying rounds =

Tournament details
- Country: England; Wales

The FA Cup 1969–70 is the 89th season of the world's oldest football knockout competition; The Football Association Challenge Cup, or FA Cup for short. The large number of clubs entering the tournament from lower down the English football league system meant that the competition started with a number of preliminary and qualifying rounds. The 30 victorious teams from the fourth round qualifying progressed to the first round proper.

== Preliminary round ==
=== Ties ===
Tie	Home team	Score	Away team
1	Boston United	2–1	Wisbech Town
2	Canvey Island	0–0	Tooting & Mitcham United
3	Chertsey Town	0–2	Wolverton Town & B R
4	Congleton Town	0–6	Winsford United
5	Darlaston	1–2	Dudley Town
6	Darwen	3–0	Penrith
7	Dorking	1–0	Fleet Town
8	Egham Town	1–1	Ruislip Manor
9	Enfield	1–1	Southall
10	Ferryhill Athletic	2–0	Boldon Colliery Welfare
11	Glastonbury	5–1	Melksham Town
12	Great Yarmouth Town	0–1	Harwich & Parkeston
13	Gresley Rovers	3–0	Long Eaton United
14	Guildford City	4–1	Uxbridge
15	Hatfield Town	0–2	Windsor & Eton
16	Hazells	3–2	Ware
17	Horsham	3–0	Lancing
18	Hyde United	1–1	Stalybridge Celtic
19	Ilkeston Town	1–2	Matlock Town
20	Kiveton Park	1–3	Yorkshire Amateur
21	Littlehampton Town	3–0	Eastbourne United
22	Loughborough United	1–1	Bedworth United
23	Lower Gornal Athletic	4–2	Brierley Hill Alliance
24	March Town United	1–1	Newmarket Town
25	Marlow	4–1	Maidenhead United
26	Norton Woodseats	1–0	Buxton
27	Poole Town	6–1	Devizes Town
28	Prescot Town	1–6	Runcorn
29	Rothwell Town	0–2	Rushden Town
30	Ryde Sports	1–1	Salisbury
31	Soham Town Rangers	1–1	Ely City
32	St Neots Town	3–0	Chatteris Town
33	Stourbridge	5–1	Stratford Town Amateurs
34	Street	1–3	Frome Town
35	Sudbury Town	1–3	Gorleston
36	Telford United	3–1	Lockheed Leamington
37	Trowbridge Town	2–3	Minehead
38	Tunbridge Wells	2–1	Whitstable Town
39	Wealdstone	2–1	Bletchley Town
40	Whitby Town	3–1	West Auckland Town
41	Winterton Rangers	5–2	Selby Town
42	Woking	4–1	Chichester City

=== Replays ===
Tie	Home team	Score	Away team
2	Tooting & Mitcham United	4–1	Canvey Island
8	Ruislip Manor	1–2	Egham Town
9	Southall	1–1	Enfield
18	Stalybridge Celtic	0–2	Hyde United
22	Bedworth United	2–1	Loughborough United
24	Newmarket Town	3–0	March Town United
30	Salisbury	3–2	Ryde Sports
31	Ely City	2–3	Soham Town Rangers

=== 2nd replay ===
Tie	Home team	Score	Away team
9	Enfield	6–2	Southall

== 1st qualifying round ==
=== Ties ===
Tie	Home team	Score	Away team
1	Alfreton Town	2–1	Sutton Town
2	Andover	4–1	Newport I O W
3	Ashby Institute	1–0	Bridlington Trinity
4	Ashford Town (Kent)	0–0	Dover
5	Atherstone Town	1–2	Rugby Town
6	Aveley	1–2	Bromley
7	Baldock Town	3–0	Harrow Borough
8	Banbury United	2–1	Wembley
9	Barnstaple Town	3–1	St Blazey
10	Basingstoke Town	1–2	Wokingham Town
11	Bedford Town	2–3	Corby Town
12	Bedlington Colliery Welfare	0–1	Whitby Town
13	Bedworth United	0–0	Arnold
14	Belper Town	0–3	Gresley Rovers
15	Bideford	1–2	Falmouth Town
16	Bilston	0–1	Stafford Rangers
17	Bishop Auckland	4–1	Washington
18	Bishop's Stortford	1–2	Hendon
19	Boston	2–3	King's Lynn
20	Bridlington Town	3–5	Barton Town
21	Bridport	9–3	Warminster Town
22	Bromsgrove Rovers	0–1	Dudley Town
23	Burscough	5–2	Leyland Motors
24	Cambridge City	7–0	Stamford
25	Cambridge United	5–0	Wellingborough Town
26	Carshalton Athletic	2–1	Banstead Athletic
27	Chatham Town	1–6	Canterbury City
28	Cheshunt	3–0	Amersham Town
29	Chippenham Town	3–2	Westbury United
30	Cinderford Town	2–3	Abergavenny Thursdays
31	Clacton Town	2–1	Thetford Town
32	Clapton	0–5	Barking
33	Clitheroe	1–5	Fleetwood
34	Consett	2–3	Annfield Plain
35	Crawley Town	4–0	Dorking
36	Crook Town	3–3	Ferryhill Athletic
37	Dagenham	3–0	Cray Wanderers
38	Desborough Town	1–2	Rushden Town
39	Dorchester Town	1–2	Glastonbury
40	Droylsden	1–0	St Helens Town
41	Dunstable Town	4–2	Marlow
42	East Grinstead	1–3	Alton Town
43	Eastbourne	5–1	Worthing
44	Eastwood Hanley	2–3	Matlock Town
45	Eastwood Town	0–1	Burton Albion
46	Edmonton	2–0	Hemel Hempstead
47	Ellesmere Port Town	1–1	Hyde United
48	Epsom & Ewell	0–1	Tilbury
49	Erith & Belvedere	2–1	St Albans City
50	Eynesbury Rovers	2–3	Newmarket Town
51	Fareham Town	3–0	Cowes
52	Finchley	1–1	Braintree & Crittall Athletic
53	Folkestone	0–0	Herne Bay
54	Frickley Colliery	2–1	Farsley Celtic
55	Gateshead	5–0	Durham City
56	Gorleston	1–2	Bury Town
57	Gothic	0–1	Harwich & Parkeston
58	Gravesend & Northfleet	0–1	Redhill
59	Great Harwood	1–3	Netherfield
60	Hampton	1–2	Grays Athletic
61	Harlow Town	2–2	Corinthian Casuals
62	Hastings United	4–0	Deal Town
63	Hayes	2–2	Staines Town
64	Haywards Heath	1–2	Horsham
65	Hednesford	2–1	Worcester City
66	Hertford Town	1–0	Slough Town
67	Hillingdon Borough	0–0	Tooting & Mitcham United
68	Hitchin Town	5–0	Chesham United
69	Hoddesdon Town	4–2	Vauxhall Motors
70	Holbeach United	1–2	Bourne Town
71	Horden Colliery Welfare	0–1	Shildon
72	Hornchurch	1–1	Egham Town
73	Horwich R M I	3–1	Guinness Exports
74	Hounslow	6–1	Hazells
75	Hull Brunswick	2–0	Winterton Rangers
76	Ilford	2–0	Leyton
77	Kingstonian	1–3	Enfield (Ordered to be replayed)
78	Lancaster City	1–0	Darwen
79	Leatherhead	0–1	Walton & Hersham
80	Letchworth Town	2–3	Irthlingborough Diamonds
81	Linotype & Machinery	0–1	Kirkby Town
82	Littlehampton Town	1–0	Bognor Regis Town
83	Llanelli	1–2	Stonehouse
84	Louth United	0–1	Skegness Town
85	Lower Gornal Athletic	1–1	Tamworth
86	Lye Town	2–3	Alvechurch
87	Maidstone United	5–4	Tonbridge
88	Malden Town	4–0	Windsor & Eton
89	Marine	2–3	South Liverpool
90	Merthyr Tydfil	2–1	Barry Town
91	Metropolitan Police	1–0	Guildford City
92	Mexborough Town	3–3	Worksop Town
93	Milnthorpe Corinthians	1–1	Lytham
94	Minehead	2–0	Bridgwater Town
95	Molesey	1–1	Huntley & Palmers
96	Moor Green	1–1	Highgate United
97	Nantwich	2–3	Northwich Victoria
98	New Brighton	2–1	Winsford United
99	New Mills	0–1	Mossley
100	Norton Woodseats	1–3	Wombwell Sporting Association
101	Oswestry Town	0–1	Runcorn
102	Poole Town	1–1	Welton Rovers
103	Porthmadog	1–3	Rhyl
104	Portland United	1–1	Frome Town
105	Pwllheli & District	0–6	Bethesda Athletic
106	Rainham Town	1–0	Wolverton Town & B R
107	Ramsgate Athletic	8–1	Snowdown Colliery Welfare
108	Rawmarsh Welfare	1–1	Heanor Town
109	Redditch United	0–0	Stourbridge
110	Retford Town	4–0	Yorkshire Amateur
111	Romford	2–2	Ford United
112	Rossendale United	3–1	Witton Albion
113	Ryhope Colliery Welfare	0–1	Ashington
114	Sandbach Ramblers	0–1	Lostock Gralam
115	Scarborough	4–1	Brigg Town
116	Selsey	3–4	Waterlooville
117	Sheppey United	3–1	Brett Sports
118	Sittingbourne	0–1	Tunbridge Wells
119	Soham Town Rangers	2–2	Potton United
120	Southwick	2–1	Arundel
121	Spalding United	0–4	Boston United
122	Spennymoor United	1–0	South Bank
123	St Neots Town	2–3	Biggleswade & District
124	Stevenage Athletic	1–3	Leighton Town
125	Stockton	3–3	Blyth Spartans
126	Taunton	2–4	Bath City
127	Telford United	7–3	Halesowen Town
128	Thackley	1–4	Gainsborough Trinity
129	Thornycroft Athletic	3–4	Salisbury
130	Ton Pentre	2–2	Gloucester City
131	Wadebridge Town	8–0	Nanpean Rovers
132	Walthamstow Avenue	1–1	Bexley United
133	Wealdstone	0–0	Aylesbury United
134	Weston Super Mare	11–2	Spencer Moulton
135	Whitley Bay	2–1	Stanley United
136	Whyteleafe	1–1	Croydon Amateurs
137	Wigan Athletic	1–1	Chorley
138	Wigan Rovers	0–6	Formby
139	Willington	2–4	Evenwood Town
140	Wingate (Durham)	3–0	Murton Colliery Welfare
141	Woking	3–3	Addlestone
142	Wycombe Wanderers	2–1	Dulwich Hamlet

=== Replays ===
Tie	Home team	Score	Away team
4	Dover	2–4	Ashford Town (Kent)
13	Arnold	6–1	Bedworth United
36	Ferryhill Athletic	0–1	Crook Town
47	Hyde United	1–0	Ellesmere Port Town
52	Braintree & Crittall Athletic	2–0	Finchley
53	Herne Bay	1–1	Folkestone
61	Corinthian Casuals	4–1	Harlow Town
63	Staines Town	1–0	Hayes
67	Tooting & Mitcham United	1–2	Hillingdon Borough
72	Egham Town	0–0	Hornchurch (Abandoned in extra time)
77	Kingstonian	0–3	Enfield
85	Tamworth	4–2	Lower Gornal Athletic
92	Worksop Town	6–1	Mexborough Town
93	Lytham	1–5	Milnthorpe Corinthians
95	Huntley & Palmers	3–1	Molesey
96	Highgate United	3–2	Moor Green
102	Welton Rovers	2–1	Poole Town
104	Frome Town	2–0	Portland United
108	Heanor Town	0–1	Rawmarsh Welfare
109	Stourbridge	3–0	Redditch United
111	Ford United	2–4	Romford (@ Romford)
119	Potton United	2–1	Soham Town Rangers
125	Blyth Spartans	8–2	Stockton
130	Gloucester City	0–1	Ton Pentre
132	Bexley United	2–2	Walthamstow Avenue
133	Aylesbury United	1–3	Wealdstone
136	Croydon Amateurs	1–1	Whyteleafe
137	Chorley	2–5	Wigan Athletic
141	Addlestone	2–0	Woking

=== 2nd replays ===
Tie	Home team	Score	Away team
53	Folkestone	1–0	Herne Bay
72	Hornchurch	5–2	Egham Town
132	Bexley United	0–2	Walthamstow Avenue
136	Croydon Amateurs	0–1	Whyteleafe

== 2nd qualifying round ==
=== Ties ===
Tie	Home team	Score	Away team
1	Addlestone	0–1	Wokingham Town
2	Alfreton Town	1–1	Wombwell Sporting Association
3	Andover	2–1	Waterlooville
4	Arnold	0–3	Rugby Town
5	Ashby Institute	0–2	Scarborough
6	Ashford Town (Kent)	1–0	Maidstone United
7	Baldock Town	0–1	Hoddesdon Town
8	Bethesda Athletic	1–3	Rhyl
9	Biggleswade & District	0–2	Cambridge City
10	Bishop Auckland	3–0	Ashington
11	Blyth Spartans	1–1	Evenwood Town
12	Boston United	0–0	Bourne Town
13	Bury Town	3–1	Clacton Town
14	Cambridge United	10–0	Potton United
15	Corinthian Casuals	1–2	Hertford Town
16	Crawley Town	1–0	Alton Town
17	Crook Town	0–4	Shildon
18	Dudley Town	3–0	Highgate United
19	Dunstable Town	3–1	Leighton Town
20	Edmonton	2–1	Ilford
21	Enfield	7–1	Grays Athletic
22	Falmouth Town	1–0	Penzance
23	Fleetwood	3–0	Netherfield
24	Folkestone	1–1	Ramsgate Athletic
25	Formby	1–2	Horwich R M I
26	Frome Town	1–4	Bath City
27	Gainsborough Trinity	2–1	Worksop Town
28	Glastonbury	3–1	Weston Super Mare
29	Gresley Rovers	0–3	Burton Albion
30	Harwich & Parkeston	0–1	Lowestoft Town
31	Hillingdon Borough	4–1	Bromley
32	Hitchin Town	3–1	Cheshunt
33	Hornchurch	0–2	Dagenham
34	Horsham	2–0	Southwick
35	Hounslow	2–2	Braintree & Crittall Athletic
36	Hull Brunswick	1–1	Barton Town
37	Huntley & Palmers	0–9	Walton & Hersham
38	Hyde United	0–1	Burscough
39	King's Lynn	2–1	Skegness Town
40	Lancaster City	3–0	Milnthorpe Corinthians
41	Littlehampton Town	2–0	Eastbourne
42	Lostock Gralam	0–5	Northwich Victoria
43	Malden Town	2–2	Barking
44	Matlock Town	2–2	Rawmarsh Welfare
45	Merthyr Tydfil	3–2	Abergavenny Thursdays
46	Metropolitan Police	1–4	Carshalton Athletic
47	Minehead	2–0	Bridport
48	Mossley	0–0	Rossendale United
49	New Brighton	1–2	Kirkby Town
50	Newmarket Town	3–1	Irthlingborough Diamonds
51	Rainham Town	1–1	Hendon
52	Retford Town	1–1	Frickley Colliery
53	Romford	2–0	Redhill
54	Runcorn	1–1	South Liverpool
55	Rushden Town	2–1	Corby Town
56	Salisbury	1–0	Fareham Town
57	Sheppey United	0–6	Hastings United
58	Spennymoor United	2–2	Gateshead
59	Stourbridge	1–1	Alvechurch
60	Tamworth	3–3	Stafford Rangers
61	Telford United	4–3	Hednesford
62	Ton Pentre	2–0	Stonehouse
63	Tunbridge Wells	3–4	Canterbury City
64	Wadebridge Town	4–2	Barnstaple Town
65	Walthamstow Avenue	2–2	Tilbury
66	Wealdstone	1–0	Banbury United
67	Welton Rovers	2–2	Chippenham Town
68	Whitby Town	3–1	Wingate (Durham)
69	Whitley Bay	7–1	Annfield Plain
70	Whyteleafe	1–2	Staines Town
71	Wigan Athletic	4–1	Droylsden
72	Wycombe Wanderers	2–0	Erith & Belvedere

=== Replays ===
Tie	Home team	Score	Away team
2	Wombwell Sporting Association	1–2	Alfreton Town
11	Evenwood Town	2–1	Blyth Spartans
12	Boston United	2–0	Bourne Town
24	Ramsgate Athletic	1–0	Folkestone
35	Braintree & Crittall Athletic	2–0	Hounslow
36	Barton Town	1–2	Hull Brunswick
43	Barking	4–0	Malden Town
44	Rawmarsh Welfare	3–2	Matlock Town
48	Rossendale United	0–1	Mossley
51	Hendon	7–2	Rainham Town
52	Frickley Colliery	3–0	Retford Town
54	South Liverpool	5–0	Runcorn
58	Gateshead	0–1	Spennymoor United
59	Alvechurch	1–3	Stourbridge
60	Stafford Rangers	0–3	Tamworth
65	Tilbury	2–2	Walthamstow Avenue
67	Chippenham Town	2–1	Welton Rovers

=== 2nd replay ===
Tie	Home team	Score	Away team
65	Tilbury	3–1	Walthamstow Avenue

== 3rd qualifying round ==
=== Ties ===
Tie	Home team	Score	Away team
1	Alfreton Town	3–1	Rawmarsh Welfare
2	Andover	0–0	Salisbury
3	Ashford Town (Kent)	1–1	Canterbury City
4	Bishop Auckland	2–1	Shildon
5	Bury Town	1–3	Lowestoft Town
6	Cambridge City	4–1	Rushden Town
7	Cambridge United	6–0	Newmarket Town
8	Chippenham Town	2–2	Glastonbury
9	Edmonton	1–4	Enfield
10	Evenwood Town	0–2	Whitby Town
11	Fleetwood	3–1	Lancaster City
12	Gainsborough Trinity	3–2	Frickley Colliery
13	Hertford Town	2–4	Hendon
14	Hoddesdon Town	1–1	Braintree & Crittall Athletic
15	King's Lynn	2–1	Boston United
16	Littlehampton Town	3–2	Horsham
17	Minehead	3–0	Bath City
18	Mossley	2–1	Horwich R M I
19	Northwich Victoria	0–2	Kirkby Town
20	Ramsgate Athletic	2–1	Hastings United
21	Romford	1–2	Dagenham
22	Rugby Town	1–0	Burton Albion
23	Scarborough	5–1	Hull Brunswick
24	South Liverpool	2–0	Rhyl
25	Staines Town	1–2	Carshalton Athletic
26	Tamworth	2–0	Dudley Town
27	Telford United	3–0	Stourbridge
28	Tilbury	1–2	Hillingdon Borough
29	Ton Pentre	4–2	Merthyr Tydfil
30	Wadebridge Town	0–5	Falmouth Town
31	Walton & Hersham	4–1	Barking
32	Wealdstone	4–0	Dunstable Town
33	Whitley Bay	2–3	Spennymoor United
34	Wigan Athletic	1–1	Burscough
35	Wokingham Town	2–5	Crawley Town
36	Wycombe Wanderers	1–0	Hitchin Town

=== Replays ===
Tie	Home team	Score	Away team
2	Salisbury	3–0	Andover
3	Canterbury City	1–4	Ashford Town (Kent)
8	Glastonbury	7–0	Chippenham Town
14	Braintree & Crittall Athletic	3–1	Hoddesdon Town
34	Burscough	2–3	Wigan Athletic

== 4th qualifying round ==
The teams that given byes to this round are Leytonstone, Wimbledon, Yeovil Town, Hereford United, South Shields, Chelmsford City, Weymouth, Grantham, Altrincham, Kidderminster Harriers, Nuneaton Borough, Oxford City, Barnet, Macclesfield Town, Tow Law Town, Kettering Town, Margate, Brentwood Town, Morecambe, Bangor City, Goole Town, Skelmersdale United, Cheltenham Town and Dartford.

=== Ties ===
Tie	Home team	Score	Away team
1	Alfreton Town	3–0	Goole Town
2	Ashford Town (Kent)	0–1	Walton & Hersham
3	Bangor City	2–1	Fleetwood
4	Brentwood Town	1–0	Lowestoft Town
5	Carshalton Athletic	1–0	Ramsgate Athletic
6	Chelmsford City	3–2	Cambridge United
7	Falmouth Town	1–1	Ton Pentre
8	Glastonbury	0–0	Cheltenham Town
9	Grantham	5–0	Gainsborough Trinity
10	Hendon	1–0	Cambridge City
11	Hereford United	3–1	Rugby Town
12	Hillingdon Borough	1–1	Dartford
13	Kettering Town	4–0	Braintree & Crittall Athletic
14	Leytonstone	0–4	Dagenham
15	Littlehampton Town	0–1	Margate
16	Macclesfield Town	3–0	Altrincham
17	Minehead	0–0	Yeovil Town
18	Mossley	4–1	Morecambe
19	Nuneaton Borough	2–4	Tamworth
20	Oxford City	2–0	King's Lynn
21	Salisbury	0–1	Weymouth
22	South Liverpool	0–0	Kirkby Town
23	South Shields	2–2	Bishop Auckland
24	Spennymoor United	1–0	Tow Law Town
25	Telford United	2–1	Kidderminster Harriers
26	Wealdstone	0–1	Enfield
27	Whitby Town	3–1	Scarborough
28	Wigan Athletic	2–0	Skelmersdale United
29	Wimbledon	0–0	Crawley Town
30	Wycombe Wanderers	0–0	Barnet

=== Replays ===
Tie	Home team	Score	Away team
7	Ton Pentre	1–1	Falmouth Town
8	Cheltenham Town	4–1	Glastonbury
12	Dartford	0–0	Hillingdon Borough
17	Yeovil Town	0–0	Minehead
22	Kirkby Town	4–3	South Liverpool
23	Bishop Auckland	1–3	South Shields
29	Crawley Town	0–0	Wimbledon
30	Barnet	3–0	Wycombe Wanderers

=== 2nd replays ===
Tie	Home team	Score	Away team
7	Falmouth Town	1–0	Ton Pentre
12	Hillingdon Borough	4–1	Dartford
17	Minehead	0–5	Yeovil Town
29	Crawley Town	0–2	Wimbledon

== 1969–70 FA Cup ==
See 1969-70 FA Cup for details of the rounds from the first round proper onwards.
