= 1972–73 Midland Football League =

Midland Football League
- Season: 1972–73
- Champions: Worksop Town
- Matches: 306
- Goals: 1,053 (3.44 per match)

The 1972–73 Midland Football League season was the 73rd in the history of the Midland Football League, a football competition in England.

== Clubs ==
The league featured 15 clubs which competed in the previous season, along with three new clubs:

- Bridlington Trinity, transferred from the Yorkshire League
- Hednesford, transferred from the West Midlands (Regional) League
- Stockton

=== League table ===
Pos	Team	Pld	W	D	L	GF	GA	GR	Pts	Qualification or relegation
1	Worksop Town	34	26	3	5	101	35	2.886	55	
2	Frickley Colliery	34	22	6	6	75	26	2.885	50	
3	Kimberley Town	34	20	5	9	66	38	1.737	45	
4	Alfreton Town	34	17	10	7	80	44	1.818	44	
5	Sutton Town	34	16	12	6	55	33	1.667	44	
6	Belper Town	34	17	9	8	52	31	1.677	43	
7	Boston	34	16	10	8	62	30	2.067	42	
8	Long Eaton United	34	14	7	13	51	56	0.911	35	
9	Gateshead	34	14	6	14	72	68	1.059	34	Club folded
10	Arnold	34	12	10	12	57	57	1.000	34	
11	Skegness Town	34	13	6	15	67	52	1.288	32	
12	Ashby Institute	34	11	8	15	54	52	1.038	30	
13	Eastwood Town	34	10	9	15	51	56	0.911	29	
14	Bridlington Trinity	34	9	5	20	58	74	0.784	23	
15	Hednesford	34	11	1	22	49	93	0.527	23	
16	Stockton	34	6	10	18	43	60	0.717	22	Resigned from the league
17	Retford Town	34	7	8	19	36	81	0.444	22	
18	Loughborough United	34	2	1	31	24	167	0.144	5	Resigned from the league

Source: nonleaguematters
Rules for classification: 1) points; 2) goal difference; 3) number of goals scored.
The points system until the 1990–91 season: 2 points for a win, 1 point for a draw and 0 points for losing.
