= 1978–79 FA Cup qualifying rounds =

Tournament details
- Country: England; Wales

The FA Cup 1978–79 is the 98th season of the world's oldest football knockout competition; The Football Association Challenge Cup, or FA Cup for short. The large number of clubs entering the tournament from lower down the English football league system meant that the competition started with a number of preliminary and qualifying rounds. The 28 victorious teams from the fourth round qualifying progressed to the first round proper.

== Preliminary round ==
=== Ties ===
Tie	Home team	Score	Away team
1	Accrington Stanley	1–2	Lancaster City
2	Alfreton Town	2–5	Mexborough Town
3	Andover	1–1	Newbury Town
4	Appleby Frodingham	1–2	Eastwood Town
5	Banbury United	4–2	Thame United
6	Barry Town	2–0	Mangotsfield United
7	Billingham Synthonia	2–1	Tow Law Town
8	Bourne Town	1–4	Arnold
9	Brierley Hill Alliance	0–2	Alvechurch
10	Bromsgrove Rovers	3–1	Lye Town
11	Burgess Hill Town	1–3	Alton Town
12	Burton Albion	0–1	Oxford City
13	Bury Town	1–2	King's Lynn
14	Carlisle City	4–2	Annfield Plain
15	Chesham United	3–3	Berkhamsted Town
16	Clapton	1–6	Barking
17	Consett	1–1	Eppleton Colliery Welfare
18	Corby Town	0–1	Barton Rovers
19	Cowes	0–0	Fareham Town
20	Crook Town	1–2	South Bank
21	Desborough Town	0–3	Friar Lane Old Boys
22	Didcot Town	1–1	Aylesbury United
23	East Grinstead	1–2	Canterbury City
24	Eastbourne United	1–0	Ashford Town (Kent)
25	Egham Town	2–3	Camberley Town
26	Epsom & Ewell	2–0	Addlestone
27	Farnborough Town	1–0	Maidenhead United
28	Farsley Celtic	0–1	Bridlington Town
29	Faversham Town	1–3	Hastings United
30	Felixstowe Town	1–0	Hoddesdon Town
31	Feltham	2–0	Hayes
32	Finchley	0–1	Hillingdon Borough
33	Folkestone & Shepway	2–1	Bromley
34	Forest Green Rovers	8–1	Calne Town
35	Formby	3–1	Ashton United
36	Frome Town	0–3	Gloucester City
37	Glastonbury	0–3	Bath City
38	Gorleston	1–0	Cambridge City
39	Gravesend & Northfleet	6–2	Aveley
40	Grays Athletic	5–1	Cheshunt
41	Halesowen Town	2–0	Bilston
42	Hampton	2–0	Banstead Athletic
43	Haringey Borough	1–3	Ilford
44	Harlow Town	1–1	Hemel Hempstead
45	Harrow Borough	0–2	Hertford Town
46	Haverhill Rovers	0–0	Lowestoft Town
47	Heanor Town	0–3	Boston United
48	Herne Bay	1–1	Horsham Y M C A
49	Holbeach United	0–3	Louth United
50	Horsham	4–0	Littlehampton Town
51	Ilminster Town	1–0	Poole Town
52	Kidderminster Harriers	5–0	Moor Green
53	Leek Town	2–2	Bangor City
54	Liskeard Athletic	1–0	Barnstaple Town
55	Macclesfield Town	2–4	Marine
56	Margate	2–0	Redhill
57	Mossley	2–1	Burscough
58	Nantwich Town	1–2	Prescot Town
59	Newmarket Town	1–2	Olney Town
60	Newquay	2–2	Penzance
61	North Ferriby United	2–0	Selby Town

=== Replays ===
Tie	Home team	Score	Away team
3	Newbury Town	1–2	Andover
15	Berkhamsted Town	1–0	Chesham United
17	Eppleton Colliery Welfare	0–7	Consett
19	Fareham Town	2–0	Cowes
22	Aylesbury United	2–1	Didcot Town
44	Hemel Hempstead	0–4	Harlow Town
46	Lowestoft Town	2–0	Haverhill Rovers
48	Horsham Y M C A	1–0	Herne Bay
53	Bangor City	1–2	Leek Town
60	Penzance	2–1	Newquay

== 1st qualifying round ==
=== Ties ===
Tie	Home team	Score	Away team
1	Arundel	2–3	Bognor Regis Town
2	Ashington	0–1	Bishop Auckland
3	Atherstone Town	2–0	Belper Town
4	Barnet	2–1	Bracknell Town
5	Barton Town	1–3	Boston
6	Bedford Town	2–1	Bishop's Stortford
7	Bedworth United	0–0	Brereton Social
8	Bexhill Town	1–1	Crawley Town
9	Bideford	2–1	Falmouth Town
10	Billericay Town	2–1	Chelmsford City
11	Boldon Community Association	2–0	Durham City
12	Boreham Wood	3–2	Burnham
13	Bridgwater Town	1–0	Chard Town
14	Bridlington Trinity	1–0	Emley
15	Bridport	0–1	Dorchester Town
16	Brigg Town	1–1	Spalding United
17	Buxton	3–1	Glossop
18	Carshalton Athletic	3–0	Chertsey Town
19	Chalfont St Peter	0–0	Epping Town
20	Cheltenham Town	6–1	Clevedon Town
21	Chichester City	1–1	Dorking Town
22	Chippenham Town	2–2	Cinderford Town
23	Chorley	3–0	Darwen
24	Clacton Town	0–4	Ely City
25	Clitheroe	0–1	Curzon Ashton
26	Congleton Town	1–2	Droylsden
27	Corinthian Casuals	0–0	Edgware Town
28	Cray Wanderers	1–2	Dulwich Hamlet
29	Croydon	1–0	Erith & Belvedere
30	Darlaston	1–1	Evesham United
31	Dover	3–0	Eastbourne Town
32	Dudley Town	3–0	Gresley Rovers
33	Easington Colliery Welfare	2–1	West Auckland Town
34	Enderby Town	3–4	Gainsborough Trinity
35	Evenwood Town	2–2	North Shields
36	Fleetwood Town	0–0	Netherfield
37	Frickley Athletic	0–2	Hednesford Town
38	Gateshead	1–0	Horden Colliery Welfare
39	Gornal Athletic	0–2	Kempston Rovers
40	Grantham	5–3	Ashby Institute
41	Great Yarmouth Town	1–1	Harwich & Parkeston
42	Guisborough Town	2–2	Consett
43	Haywards Heath	4–0	Wigmore Athletic
44	Highgate United	2–1	Stourbridge
45	Hinckley Athletic	5–0	Long Eaton United
46	Histon	3–1	Parson Drove United
47	Hornchurch	1–1	Leytonstone
48	Hounslow	1–1	St Albans City
49	Hungerford Town	5–1	Swaythling
50	Hyde United	1–1	Skelmersdale United
51	Irthlingborough Diamonds	3–0	Friar Lane Old Boys
52	Kingstonian	1–0	Tring Town
53	Larkhall Athletic	3–3	Paulton Rovers
54	Letchworth Garden City	5–1	Felixstowe Town
55	Lewes	1–1	Ramsgate
56	Leyland Motors	1–2	Horwich R M I
57	Leyton Wingate	1–0	Tilbury
58	Llanelli	1–3	Shepton Mallet Town
59	Lytham	0–2	Barrow
60	Maidstone United	2–0	Horsham Y M C A
61	March Town United	4–1	Chatteris Town
62	Marlow	1–1	Feltham
63	Medway	4–1	Sidley United
64	Melksham Town	1–0	Gloucester City
65	Merthyr Tydfil	4–0	Bridgend Town
66	Metropolitan Police	1–0	Harlow Town
67	Milton Keynes City	2–0	Coventry Sporting
68	Molesey	2–2	Hillingdon Borough
69	New Brighton	1–3	Prestwich Heys
70	New Mills	2–0	Denaby United
71	Newport I O W	0–1	Basingstoke Town
72	Oldbury United	1–1	Willenhall Town
73	Oswestry Town	1–1	St Helens Town
74	Penrith	0–4	Lancaster City
75	Porthmadog	3–1	Marine
76	Potton United	0–1	Rushden Town
77	Racing Club Warwick	1–1	Tamworth
78	Radcliffe Borough	0–6	Runcorn
79	Rainham Town	0–4	Walthamstow Avenue
80	Redditch United	3–2	Tividale
81	Retford Town	2–1	Stamford
82	Rhyl	2–0	Prescot Town
83	Ringmer	0–2	Hastings United
84	Rothwell Town	1–1	Olney Town
85	Ruislip Manor	0–3	Southall & Ealing Borough
86	Salisbury	4–0	Welton Rovers
87	Saltash United	8–1	Penzance
88	Selsey	2–3	Tunbridge Wells
89	Sheppey United	1–4	Canterbury City
90	Shildon	3–1	Whitley Bay
91	Sittingbourne	1–4	Eastbourne United
92	Skegness Town	0–1	Louth United
93	Slough Town	2–0	Farnborough Town
94	Snowdown Colliery Welfare	0–3	Tonbridge
95	Soham Town Rangers	2–0	Sudbury Town
96	South Liverpool	0–3	Formby
97	Southwick	1–2	Horsham
98	Spennymoor United	2–1	Carlisle City
99	St Blazey	0–3	Taunton Town
100	St Neots Town	1–0	King's Lynn
101	Staines Town	2–1	Willesden
102	Stalybridge Celtic	3–1	Leek Town
103	Stowmarket	0–1	Lowestoft Town
104	Stratford Town	2–2	Kidderminster Harriers
105	Sutton Coldfield Town	3–0	Oxford City
106	Sutton Town	0–0	Boston United
107	Sutton United	2–1	Hertford Town
108	Telford United	0–1	Halesowen Town
109	Thetford Town	1–5	Gorleston
110	Three Bridges	0–2	Margate
111	Tiverton Town	1–0	Ilminster Town
112	Ton Pentre	0–1	Barry Town
113	Trowbridge Town	1–0	Forest Green Rovers
114	Uxbridge	2–1	Berkhamsted Town
115	V S Rugby	2–0	Dunstable
116	Wadebridge Town	0–2	Liskeard Athletic
117	Wallsend Town	1–0	Ferryhill Athletic
118	Walton & Hersham	2–3	Camberley Town
119	Ware	0–2	Barking
120	Washington	3–2	Blue Star
121	Waterlooville	2–0	Fareham Town
122	Welling United	1–2	Gravesend & Northfleet
123	Wellingborough Town	1–1	Arnold
124	Wembley	0–0	Grays Athletic
125	Weston Super Mare	1–2	Bath City
126	Whitby Town	3–3	Worsbrough Bridge Miners Welfare
127	Whitstable Town	1–1	Folkestone & Shepway
128	Willington	0–1	Billingham Synthonia
129	Windsor & Eton	1–0	Hampton
130	Wingate (Durham)	0–0	South Bank
131	Winsford United	3–0	Mexborough Town
132	Winterton Rangers	0–0	North Ferriby United
133	Wisbech Town	0–2	Barton Rovers
134	Witney Town	0–2	Banbury United
135	Witton Albion	4–2	Mossley
136	Woking	3–1	Epsom & Ewell
137	Wokingham Town	2–0	Aylesbury United
138	Wolverton Town & B R	1–2	Alvechurch
139	Worcester City	1–0	Bromsgrove Rovers
140	Worksop Town	2–1	Eastwood Town
141	Worthing	4–1	Alton Town
142	Yeovil Town	4–0	Andover
143	Yorkshire Amateur	0–0	Bridlington Town

=== Replays ===
Tie	Home team	Score	Away team
7	Brereton Social	3–2	Bedworth United
8	Crawley Town	1–1	Bexhill Town
16	Spalding United	3–4	Brigg Town
19	Epping Town	1–1	Chalfont St Peter
21	Dorking Town	3–2	Chichester City
22	Cinderford Town	2–1	Chippenham Town
27	Edgware Town	4–0	Corinthian Casuals
30	Evesham United	2–4	Darlaston
35	North Shields	1–0	Evenwood Town
36	Netherfield	1–1	Fleetwood Town
41	Harwich & Parkeston	4–1	Great Yarmouth Town
42	Consett	3–2	Guisborough Town
47	Leytonstone	4–1	Hornchurch
48	St Albans City	4–2	Hounslow
50	Skelmersdale United	0–1	Hyde United
53	Paulton Rovers	2–1	Larkhall Athletic
55	Ramsgate	3–0	Lewes
62	Feltham	3–0	Marlow
68	Hillingdon Borough	2–1	Molesey
72	Willenhall Town	2–0	Oldbury United
73	St Helens Town	0–0	Oswestry Town
77	Tamworth	1–0	Racing Club Warwick
84	Olney Town	0–1	Rothwell Town
104	Kidderminster Harriers	7–0	Stratford Town
106	Boston United	2–1	Sutton Town
123	Arnold	2–1	Wellingborough Town
124	Grays Athletic	4–1	Wembley
126	Worsbrough Bridge Miners Welfare	0–1	Whitby Town
127	Folkestone & Shepway	5–0	Whitstable Town
130	South Bank	1–1	Wingate (Durham)
132	North Ferriby United	0–1	Winterton Rangers
143	Bridlington Town	2–3	Yorkshire Amateur

=== 2nd replays ===
Tie	Home team	Score	Away team
8	Bexhill Town	0–1	Crawley Town
19	Chalfont St Peter	0–0	Epping Town
36	Fleetwood Town	2–0	Netherfield
73	Oswestry Town	3–2	St Helens Town
130	Wingate (Durham)	0–0	South Bank

=== 3rd replay ===
Tie	Home team	Score	Away team
19	Epping Town	1–2	Chalfont St Peter
130	South Bank	2–1	Wingate (Durham)

== 2nd qualifying round ==
=== Ties ===
Tie	Home team	Score	Away team
1	Atherstone Town	1–3	Irthlingborough Diamonds
2	Barnet	3–2	Feltham
3	Bedford Town	5–2	Rothwell Town
4	Bideford	2–0	Saltash United
5	Billericay Town	5–1	Letchworth Garden City
6	Bishop Auckland	0–0	Consett
7	Bognor Regis Town	0–2	Waterlooville
8	Boldon Community Association	3–2	Washington
9	Boreham Wood	0–2	Hillingdon Borough
10	Boston	0–1	Grantham
11	Brereton Social	3–2	Sutton Coldfield Town
12	Bridgwater Town	5–1	Tiverton Town
13	Bridlington Trinity	2–2	Winterton Rangers
14	Brigg Town	1–1	Worksop Town
15	Buxton	2–0	Rhyl
16	Carshalton Athletic	1–2	Slough Town
17	Chalfont St Peter	0–2	Sutton United
18	Cheltenham Town	6–0	Melksham Town
19	Chorley	2–1	Barrow
20	Cinderford Town	0–1	Merthyr Tydfil
21	Crawley Town	1–2	Hastings United
22	Croydon	0–2	Margate
23	Curzon Ashton	1–2	Horwich R M I
24	Darlaston	5–0	Milton Keynes City
25	Dorchester Town	1–0	Basingstoke Town
26	Dorking Town	0–2	Horsham
27	Dover	0–0	Maidstone United
28	Droylsden	3–1	Porthmadog
29	Dudley Town	2–0	Kidderminster Harriers
30	Dulwich Hamlet	4–0	Ilford
31	Easington Colliery Welfare	1–3	Billingham Synthonia
32	Edgware Town	1–0	Metropolitan Police
33	Ely City	1–2	Lowestoft Town
34	Fleetwood Town	1–1	Lancaster City
35	Gainsborough Trinity	1–1	Louth United
36	Gateshead	6–0	Wallsend Town
37	Harwich & Parkeston	1–1	March Town United
38	Haywards Heath	1–2	Worthing
39	Hednesford Town	4–0	New Mills
40	Highgate United	0–0	Worcester City
41	Hinckley Athletic	1–0	Arnold
42	Histon	0–1	St Neots Town
43	Hungerford Town	4–4	Yeovil Town
44	Hyde United	2–2	Formby
45	Kempston Rovers	3–1	V S Rugby
46	Kingstonian	3–0	Uxbridge
47	Leyton Wingate	2–0	Grays Athletic
48	Leytonstone	1–2	Barking
49	Medway	0–0	Eastbourne United
50	North Shields	0–3	Spennymoor United
51	Oswestry Town	0–1	Winsford United
52	Paulton Rovers	1–2	Barry Town
53	Prestwich Heys	1–1	Stalybridge Celtic
54	Ramsgate	1–0	Canterbury City
55	Redditch United	1–0	Alvechurch
56	Retford Town	1–4	Boston United
57	Runcorn	3–1	Witton Albion
58	Rushden Town	1–1	Barton Rovers
59	Salisbury	0–2	Bath City
60	Shepton Mallet Town	1–2	Trowbridge Town
61	Shildon	2–1	South Bank
62	Soham Town Rangers	0–3	Gorleston
63	Southall & Ealing Borough	2–2	Camberley Town
64	St Albans City	0–0	Wokingham Town
65	Staines Town	0–0	Windsor & Eton
66	Tamworth	0–2	Halesowen Town
67	Taunton Town	6–0	Liskeard Athletic
68	Tonbridge	2–3	Folkestone & Shepway
69	Tunbridge Wells	0–2	Woking
70	Walthamstow Avenue	2–3	Gravesend & Northfleet
71	Whitby Town	1–2	Yorkshire Amateur
72	Willenhall Town	2–0	Banbury United

=== Replays ===
Tie	Home team	Score	Away team
6	Consett	2–1	Bishop Auckland
13	Winterton Rangers	2–1	Bridlington Trinity
14	Worksop Town	1–1	Brigg Town
27	Maidstone United	1–0	Dover
34	Lancaster City	0–1	Fleetwood Town
35	Louth United	1–2	Gainsborough Trinity
37	March Town United	2–1	Harwich & Parkeston
40	Worcester City	3–2	Highgate United
43	Yeovil Town	3–0	Hungerford Town
44	Formby	2–1	Hyde United
49	Eastbourne United	0–0	Medway
53	Stalybridge Celtic	4–1	Prestwich Heys
58	Barton Rovers	3–1	Rushden Town
63	Camberley Town	1–3	Southall & Ealing Borough
64	Wokingham Town	4–1	St Albans City
65	Windsor & Eton	1–0	Staines Town

=== 2nd replays ===
Tie	Home team	Score	Away team
14	Brigg Town	0–2	Worksop Town
49	Medway	0–6	Eastbourne United

== 3rd qualifying round ==
=== Ties ===
Tie	Home team	Score	Away team
1	Barking	2–0	Billericay Town
2	Barry Town	0–2	Merthyr Tydfil
3	Barton Rovers	0–2	Bedford Town
4	Bath City	7–1	Bridgwater Town
5	Billingham Synthonia	0–0	Boldon Community Association
6	Boston United	3–0	Gainsborough Trinity
7	Eastbourne United	2–1	Hastings United
8	Fleetwood Town	0–1	Chorley
9	Folkestone & Shepway	0–2	Margate
10	Formby	0–0	Horwich R M I
11	Gorleston	3–1	Lowestoft Town
12	Gravesend & Northfleet	1–1	Dulwich Hamlet
13	Halesowen Town	0–1	Dudley Town
14	Hinckley Athletic	1–2	Irthlingborough Diamonds
15	Kingstonian	0–0	Hillingdon Borough
16	Leyton Wingate	1–1	Edgware Town
17	Ramsgate	1–3	Maidstone United
18	Redditch United	0–0	Brereton Social
19	Runcorn	1–1	Buxton
20	Shildon	1–8	Gateshead
21	Southall & Ealing Borough	1–0	Slough Town
22	Spennymoor United	0–0	Consett
23	St Neots Town	2–3	March Town United
24	Stalybridge Celtic	1–1	Droylsden
25	Taunton Town	3–0	Bideford
26	Trowbridge Town	0–4	Cheltenham Town
27	Willenhall Town	0–2	Kempston Rovers
28	Windsor & Eton	0–1	Sutton United
29	Winsford United	1–2	Hednesford Town
30	Woking	5–2	Horsham
31	Wokingham Town	0–4	Barnet
32	Worcester City	7–1	Darlaston
33	Worksop Town	0–0	Grantham
34	Worthing	1–1	Waterlooville
35	Yeovil Town	2–1	Dorchester Town
36	Yorkshire Amateur	1–0	Winterton Rangers

=== Replays ===
Tie	Home team	Score	Away team
5	Boldon Community Association	2–4	Billingham Synthonia
10	Horwich R M I	5–1	Formby
12	Dulwich Hamlet	0–1	Gravesend & Northfleet
15	Hillingdon Borough	3–2	Kingstonian
16	Edgware Town	3–1	Leyton Wingate
18	Brereton Social	0–1	Redditch United
19	Buxton	0–4	Runcorn
22	Consett	1–2	Spennymoor United
24	Droylsden	3–1	Stalybridge Celtic
33	Grantham	0–3	Worksop Town
34	Waterlooville	3–0	Worthing

== 4th qualifying round ==
The teams that given byes to this round are Southport, Workington, Dagenham, Stafford Rangers, Matlock Town, Morecambe, Dartford, Hendon, Kettering Town, Weymouth, Hitchin Town, Tooting & Mitcham United, Minehead, Nuneaton Borough, Wealdstone, Northwich Victoria, A P Leamington, Goole Town, Blyth Spartans and Enfield.

=== Ties ===
Tie	Home team	Score	Away team
1	A P Leamington	0–0	Hednesford Town
2	Barking	3–1	Bedford Town
3	Bath City	1–1	Worcester City
4	Billingham Synthonia	0–1	Blyth Spartans
5	Cheltenham Town	1–2	Yeovil Town
6	Chorley	4–2	Yorkshire Amateur
7	Dagenham	0–0	Irthlingborough Diamonds
8	Droylsden	2–0	Goole Town
9	Dudley Town	0–1	Worksop Town
10	Edgware Town	0–1	Barnet
11	Gateshead	1–1	Workington
12	Gorleston	2–6	Enfield
13	Gravesend & Northfleet	3–1	Eastbourne United
14	Hendon	1–3	Hitchin Town
15	Hillingdon Borough	2–1	Tooting & Mitcham United
16	Kettering Town	1–3	Boston United
17	March Town United	2–1	Southall & Ealing Borough
18	Margate	1–7	Woking
19	Merthyr Tydfil	2–0	Minehead
20	Morecambe	3–1	Horwich R M I
21	Northwich Victoria	0–0	Southport
22	Nuneaton Borough	2–2	Matlock Town
23	Spennymoor United	0–0	Runcorn
24	Stafford Rangers	2–1	Redditch United
25	Sutton United	0–2	Dartford
26	Taunton Town	0–2	Weymouth
27	Waterlooville	1–2	Maidstone United
28	Wealdstone	1–0	Kempston Rovers

=== Replays ===
Tie	Home team	Score	Away team
1	Hednesford Town	2–3	A P Leamington
3	Worcester City	2–1	Bath City
7	Irthlingborough Diamonds	1–2	Dagenham
11	Workington	3–2	Gateshead
21	Southport	2–0	Northwich Victoria
22	Matlock Town	2–2	Nuneaton Borough
23	Runcorn	2–1	Spennymoor United

=== 2nd replay ===
Tie	Home team	Score	Away team
22	Nuneaton Borough	2–1	Matlock Town

== 1978–79 FA Cup ==
See 1978-79 FA Cup for details of the rounds from the first round proper onwards.
