= 1980–81 FA Cup qualifying rounds =

Tournament details
- Country: England; Wales

The FA Cup 1980–81 is the 100th season of the world's oldest football knockout competition; The Football Association Challenge Cup, or FA Cup for short. The large number of clubs entering the tournament from lower down the English football league system meant that the competition started with a number of preliminary and qualifying rounds. The 28 victorious teams from the fourth round qualifying progressed to the first round proper.

== Preliminary round ==
=== Ties ===
Tie	Home team	Score	Away team
1	Arundel	0–2	Kingstonian
2	Bath City	7–1	Glastonbury
3	Bilston	3–2	Congleton Town
4	Bracknell Town	1–5	Poole Town
5	Brereton Social	1–1	Evesham United
6	Bridlington Trinity	3–0	Eppleton Colliery Welfare
7	Brierley Hill Alliance	0–2	Darlaston
8	Bury Town	2–1	Felixstowe Town
9	Buxton	1–2	Eastwood Town
10	Caernarfon Town	0–2	Chorley
11	Calne Town	0–1	Chippenham Town
12	Carlisle City	1–4	Farsley Celtic
13	Carshalton Athletic	2–0	Feltham
14	Chard Town	1–1	Clevedon Town
15	Chatham Town	2–1	Eastbourne United
16	Chatteris Town	1–1	Great Yarmouth Town
17	Chertsey Town	2–1	Dunstable
18	Cheshunt	0–1	Clapton
19	Chichester City	1–1	Devizes Town
20	Cinderford Town	0–0	Forest Green Rovers
21	Consett	0–2	Crook Town
22	Crawley Town	2–1	Deal Town
23	Cray Wanderers	1–1	Dorking Town
24	Denaby United	1–3	Frickley Athletic
25	Desborough Town	2–1	Friar Lane Old Boys
26	Dulwich Hamlet	3–1	Hampton
27	Easington Colliery Welfare	0–2	South Bank
28	Edgware	4–3	Hoddesdon Town
29	Egham Town	3–1	Molesey
30	Emley	0–3	Fleetwood Town
31	Epping Town	2–1	Haringey Borough
32	Formby	0–2	Glossop
33	Gainsborough Trinity	3–1	Heanor Town
34	Gresley Rovers	1–1	Highgate United
35	Hayes	2–0	Hemel Hempstead
36	Haywards Heath	1–0	Whitstable Town
37	Herne Bay	0–3	Tonbridge
38	Histon	3–0	Irthlingborough Diamonds
39	Hornchurch	2–3	Walthamstow Avenue
40	Horsham	1–6	Lewes
41	Lye Town	2–0	Mangotsfield United
42	March Town United	2–1	Stamford
43	Milton Keynes City	0–2	Southall
44	Nantwich Town	0–0	Winterton Rangers
45	Netherfield	3–2	Washington
46	New Brighton	1–3	Worsbrough Bridge Miners Welfare
47	Newbury Town	1–0	Pagham
48	Newmarket Town	1–0	Wellingborough Town
49	Newquay	8–0	Ottery St Mary
50	Normanby Park Works	0–0	Sutton Town
51	Oxford City	0–2	Cheltenham Town
52	Paulton Rovers	0–3	Weston Super Mare
53	Peacehaven & Telscombe	0–1	Tilbury
54	Peterlee Newtown	1–1	West Auckland Town
55	Porthmadog	1–1	Skelmersdale United
56	Potton United	0–1	Wisbech Town
57	Prescot Cables	2–1	South Liverpool
58	Racing Club Warwick	1–2	V S Rugby
59	Rainham Town	3–4	Uxbridge
60	Redditch United	0–0	Witton Albion
61	Ringmer	3–1	Tunbridge Wells
62	Rossendale United	1–1	Worksop Town
63	Saltash United	5–0	Wadebridge Town
64	Shepton Mallet Town	2–1	Welton Rovers
65	St Neots Town	3–1	Thetford Town
66	Staines Town	0–1	Willesden
67	Tamworth	3–0	Wolverton Town
68	Thackley	1–1	Wingate (Durham)
69	Three Bridges	0–1	Wokingham Town
70	Tiptree United	3–0	Wootton Blue Cross
71	Walsall Wood	0–3	Winsford United
72	Walton & Hersham	3–0	Woodford Town
73	Whitby Town	3–1	Yorkshire Amateur
74	Worthing	0–1	Basingstoke Town

=== Replays ===
Tie	Home team	Score	Away team
5	Evesham United	3–2	Brereton Social
14	Clevedon Town	4–1	Chard Town
16	Great Yarmouth Town	3–2	Chatteris Town
19	Devizes Town	1–3	Chichester City
20	Forest Green Rovers	0–0	Cinderford Town
23	Dorking Town	0–2	Cray Wanderers
34	Highgate United	3–1	Gresley Rovers
44	Winterton Rangers	0–1	Nantwich Town
50	Sutton Town	2–3	Normanby Park Works
54	West Auckland Town	3–4	Peterlee Newtown
55	Skelmersdale United	3–1	Porthmadog
60	Witton Albion	5–1	Redditch United
62	Worksop Town	3–1	Rossendale United
68	Wingate (Durham)	0–1	Thackley

=== 2nd replays ===
Tie	Home team	Score	Away team
20	Cinderford Town	1–2	Forest Green Rovers

== 1st qualifying round ==
=== Ties ===
Tie	Home team	Score	Away team
1	Accrington Stanley	2–0	Darwen
2	Addlestone & Weybridge Town	2–2	Boreham Wood
3	Alfreton Town	2–1	Brigg Town
4	Almondsbury Greenway	0–1	Barnstaple Town
5	Alton Town	0–3	Andover
6	Alvechurch	0–2	Banbury United
7	Annfield Plain	2–3	Billingham Synthonia
8	Appleby Frodingham{1}	5–0	Ashby Institute
9	Armitage	1–2	Belper Town
10	Arnold	0–1	Barton Town
11	Ashford Town (Kent)	4–1	Corinthian Casuals
12	Ashington	0–3	Bishop Auckland
13	Aveley	2–0	Basildon United
14	Aylesbury United	2–0	Burnham
15	Bangor City	0–2	Bootle
16	Barrow	8–1	Boldon Community Association
17	Barry Town	1–0	Bromsgrove Rovers
18	Barton Rovers	3–0	Camberley Town
19	Basingstoke Town	2–3	Egham Town
20	Bedford Town	3–2	Bishop's Stortford
21	Bedworth United	2–0	Gornal Athletic
22	Berkhamsted Town	1–2	Finchley
23	Bexhill Town	0–7	Bromley
24	Bideford	1–0	Bridgwater Town
25	Billericay Town	1–1	Chalfont St Peter
26	Blue Star	3–1	Bridlington Town
27	Bognor Regis Town	3–1	Bridport
28	Boston	6–1	Spalding United
29	Boston United	3–0	Skegness Town
30	Bourne Town	0–0	Cambridge City
31	Brandon United	0–0	Shildon
32	Bridgend Town	0–1	Ton Pentre
33	Burgess Hill Town	1–2	Canterbury City
34	Burscough	2–1	Prestwich Heys
35	Burton Albion	2–2	Willenhall Town
36	Chelmsford City	0–0	Clacton Town
37	Cheltenham Town	3–2	Forest Green Rovers
38	Chesham United	0–1	St Albans City
39	Clitheroe	1–1	Curzon Ashton
40	Corby Town	1–0	Ely City
41	Coventry Sporting	2–3	Hinckley Athletic
42	Croydon	1–0	Southwick
43	Dartford	4–1	Saffron Walden Town
44	Droylsden	1–1	Stalybridge Celtic
45	Enderby Town	3–1	Tividale
46	Epsom & Ewell	1–0	Eastbourne Town
47	Evesham United	0–1	Buckingham Town
48	Falmouth Town	1–1	Liskeard Athletic
49	Fareham Town	2–0	Newport I O W
50	Faversham Town	0–2	Dover
51	Ferryhill Athletic	2–2	Evenwood Town
52	Folkestone	6–2	East Grinstead
53	Frome Town	1–1	Farnborough Town
54	Gloucester City	1–0	Dorchester Town
55	Goole Town	1–0	Whitley Bay
56	Gosport Borough	0–0	Hastings United
57	Grays Athletic	0–0	Erith & Belvedere
58	Guisborough Town	2–3	Gateshead
59	Halesowen Town	1–1	Didcot Town
60	Haverhill Rovers	2–3	Gorleston
61	Haywards Heath	0–1	Crawley Town
62	Hillingdon Borough	0–0	Hendon
63	Hitchin Town	3–0	Rushden Town
64	Horden Colliery Welfare	1–0	Willington
65	Hungerford Town	5–1	Wick
66	Ilkeston Town	0–0	Holbeach United
67	Kempston Rovers	3–0	Hertford Town
68	Kidderminster Harriers	3–0	Hednesford Town
69	Kingstonian	1–0	Banstead Athletic
70	Lancaster City	1–1	Hyde United
71	Leyton Wingate	0–3	Harefield United
72	Leytonstone Ilford	0–1	Wembley
73	Llanelli	2–0	Clandown
74	Long Eaton United	0–0	Grantham
75	Lowestoft Town	0–2	Harwich & Parkeston
76	Lye Town	1–1	Chippenham Town
77	Lytham	0–2	Leyland Motors
78	Maidenhead United	1–0	Thame United
79	Maidstone United	6–0	Ramsgate
80	March Town United	1–2	Gainsborough Trinity
81	Margate	1–1	Sittingbourne
82	Marine	3–0	Rhyl
83	Marlow	1–2	Harrow Borough
84	Melksham Town	7–0	Ilminster Town
85	Metropolitan Police	2–3	Hounslow
86	Mexborough Town Athletic	1–2	Leek Town
87	Moor Green	4–0	Rothwell Town
88	Moreton Town	0–1	Dudley Town
89	Nantwich Town	0–0	Eastwood Town
90	Netherfield	1–2	Bridlington Trinity
91	Newbury Town	2–0	Chichester City
92	Newmarket Town	1–1	Hayes
93	Normanby Park Works	0–4	Desborough Town
94	North Ferriby United	1–0	Horwich R M I
95	North Shields	0–0	Tow Law Town
96	Northwich Victoria	1–0	New Mills{1}
97	Oldbury United	4–0	Matlock Town
98	Oswestry Town	0–1	Colwyn Bay
99	Parson Drove United	0–1	Stowmarket
100	Penrith	6–0	Durham City
101	Peterlee Newtown	0–2	Farsley Celtic
102	Prescot Cables	2–0	Glossop
103	Redhill	0–2	Littlehampton Town
104	Ringmer	3–3	Lewes
105	Salisbury	1–1	Trowbridge Town
106	Saltash United	4–0	Newquay
107	Shepton Mallet Town	0–4	Clevedon Town
108	Skelmersdale United	0–1	Chorley
109	Slough Town	5–1	Ware
110	Soham Town Rangers	1–1	King's Lynn
111	Southall	0–8	Dulwich Hamlet
112	Southport	1–3	St Helens Town
113	St Blazey	1–2	Penzance
114	St Neots Town	0–1	Great Yarmouth Town
115	Stourbridge	6–2	Macclesfield Town
116	Sudbury Town	0–3	Letchworth Garden City
117	Sutton Coldfield Town	2–0	Telford United
118	Sutton United	3–1	Steyning Town
119	Tamworth	3–0	Histon
120	Thackley	1–0	Crook Town
121	Tilbury	4–1	Cray Wanderers
122	Tiptree United	0–1	Edgware
123	Tiverton Town	0–5	Taunton Town
124	Tonbridge	1–1	Chatham Town
125	Tooting & Mitcham United	0–3	Windsor & Eton
126	Uxbridge	1–0	Epping Town
127	V S Rugby	3–1	Darlaston
128	Wallsend Town	0–2	Spennymoor United
129	Walthamstow Avenue	5–0	Clapton
130	Walton & Hersham	1–0	Chertsey Town
131	Waterlooville	2–0	Horsham Y M C A
132	Welling United	4–2	Sheppey United
133	Weston Super Mare	1–2	Bath City
134	Whitby Town	3–0	South Bank
135	Willesden	0–2	Carshalton Athletic
136	Winsford United	4–2	Bilston
137	Wisbech Town	1–2	Bury Town
138	Witney Town	2–1	Ruislip Manor
139	Witton Albion	3–1	Highgate United
140	Woking	2–1	Tring Town
141	Wokingham Town	0–1	Poole Town
142	Worcester City	1–1	Malvern Town
143	Worksop Town	3–2	Frickley Athletic
144	Worsbrough Bridge Miners Welfare	0–4	Fleetwood Town

=== Replays ===
Tie	Home team	Score	Away team
2	Boreham Wood	0–2	Addlestone & Weybridge Town
25	Chalfont St Peter	0–3	Billericay Town
30	Cambridge City	0–1	Bourne Town
31	Shildon	1–0	Brandon United
35	Willenhall Town	1–2	Burton Albion
36	Clacton Town	1–2	Chelmsford City
39	Curzon Ashton	2–2	Clitheroe
44	Stalybridge Celtic	2–1	Droylsden
48	Liskeard Athletic	2–3	Falmouth Town
51	Evenwood Town	2–1	Ferryhill Athletic
53	Farnborough Town	1–0	Frome Town
56	Hastings United	3–4	Gosport Borough
57	Erith & Belvedere	1–3	Grays Athletic
59	Didcot Town	0–1	Halesowen Town
62	Hendon	3–2	Hillingdon Borough
66	Holbeach United	1–0	Ilkeston Town
70	Hyde United	3–1	Lancaster City
74	Grantham	2–2	Long Eaton United
76	Chippenham Town	0–2	Lye Town
81	Sittingbourne	3–4	Margate
89	Eastwood Town	1–0	Nantwich Town
92	Hayes	5–0	Newmarket Town
95	Tow Law Town	4–2	North Shields
104	Lewes	6–2	Ringmer
105	Trowbridge Town	2–1	Salisbury
110	King's Lynn	2–1	Soham Town Rangers
124	Chatham Town	1–0	Tonbridge
142	Malvern Town	0–2	Worcester City

=== 2nd replays ===
Tie	Home team	Score	Away team
39	Clitheroe	0–1	Curzon Ashton
74	Grantham	3–0	Long Eaton United

== 2nd qualifying round ==
=== Ties ===
Tie	Home team	Score	Away team
1	Accrington Stanley	1–1	Fleetwood Town
2	Addlestone & Weybridge Town	1–0	Carshalton Athletic
3	Alfreton Town	1–0	Eastwood Town
4	Andover	0–2	Poole Town
5	Appleby Frodingham{1}	0–2	Worksop Town
6	Ashford Town (Kent)	3–0	Crawley Town
7	Aveley	2–0	Walthamstow Avenue
8	Aylesbury United	6–0	Uxbridge
9	Banbury United	3–3	V S Rugby
10	Barnstaple Town	0–1	Bath City
11	Barrow	1–1	Whitby Town
12	Barry Town	1–1	Lye Town
13	Barton Rovers	1–0	Walton & Hersham
14	Barton Town	4–1	Desborough Town
15	Bedford Town	4–0	Bury Town
16	Bedworth United	1–2	Witton Albion
17	Belper Town	2–2	Winsford United
18	Bideford	2–1	Clevedon Town
19	Billericay Town	1–2	Dulwich Hamlet
20	Billingham Synthonia	2–0	Farsley Celtic
21	Bishop Auckland	1–0	Bridlington Trinity
22	Blue Star	2–0	Thackley
23	Bognor Regis Town	1–2	Newbury Town
24	Bootle	0–1	Chorley
25	Bourne Town	0–2	Great Yarmouth Town
26	Bromley	4–0	Chatham Town
27	Buckingham Town	2–1	Cheltenham Town
28	Canterbury City	2–1	Tilbury
29	Chelmsford City	3–1	Edgware
30	Colwyn Bay	2–2	Marine
31	Corby Town	2–0	Gainsborough Trinity
32	Curzon Ashton	1–4	Prescot Cables
33	Dover	2–0	Welling United
34	Dudley Town	0–0	Moor Green
35	Epsom & Ewell	3–1	Margate
36	Evenwood Town	2–0	Shildon
37	Falmouth Town	2–1	Saltash United
38	Farnborough Town	1–0	Fareham Town
39	Finchley	0–1	Hayes
40	Folkestone	0–2	Maidstone United
41	Gateshead	2–0	Tow Law Town
42	Gloucester City	0–1	Trowbridge Town
43	Gorleston	0–1	Hitchin Town
44	Gosport Borough	2–1	Lewes
45	Grantham	1–3	Boston United
46	Grays Athletic	2–0	Dartford
47	Halesowen Town	1–4	Kidderminster Harriers
48	Harefield United	0–0	Maidenhead United
49	Harrow Borough	3–4	St Albans City
50	Harwich & Parkeston	2–1	Stowmarket
51	Hendon	1–1	Woking
52	Hinckley Athletic	2–1	Tamworth
53	Holbeach United	0–3	Boston
54	Hounslow	1–3	Slough Town
55	Hyde United	1–2	Burscough
56	Kempston Rovers	2–1	Witney Town
57	King's Lynn	2–0	Enderby Town
58	Kingstonian	2–1	Egham Town
59	Leek Town	1–1	Northwich Victoria
60	Letchworth Garden City	0–0	Wembley
61	Leyland Motors	0–4	St Helens Town
62	Littlehampton Town	0–3	Croydon
63	Llanelli	0–3	Worcester City
64	Melksham Town	0–3	Ton Pentre
65	North Ferriby United	0–0	Stalybridge Celtic
66	Oldbury United	0–3	Sutton Coldfield Town
67	Penrith	2–0	Goole Town
68	Penzance	2–3	Taunton Town
69	Spennymoor United	1–2	Horden Colliery Welfare
70	Stourbridge	1–1	Burton Albion
71	Sutton United	2–0	Hungerford Town
72	Waterlooville	0–0	Windsor & Eton

=== Replays ===
Tie	Home team	Score	Away team
1	Fleetwood Town	3–2	Accrington Stanley
9	V S Rugby	1–3	Banbury United
11	Whitby Town	1–2	Barrow
12	Lye Town	1–2	Barry Town
17	Winsford United	5–0	Belper Town
30	Marine	4–0	Colwyn Bay
34	Moor Green	2–1	Dudley Town
48	Maidenhead United	5–1	Harefield United
51	Woking	1–4	Hendon
59	Northwich Victoria	1–0	Leek Town
60	Wembley	3–1	Letchworth Garden City
65	Stalybridge Celtic	3–0	North Ferriby United
70	Burton Albion	2–1	Stourbridge
72	Windsor & Eton	4–1	Waterlooville

== 3rd qualifying round ==
=== Ties ===
Tie	Home team	Score	Away team
1	Boston	0–1	Corby Town
2	Boston United	2–0	Barton Town
3	Burscough	4–0	Prescot Cables
4	Burton Albion	2–2	Winsford United
5	Croydon	0–1	Gosport Borough
6	Dover	2–2	Canterbury City
7	Epsom & Ewell	1–0	Ashford Town (Kent)
8	Evenwood Town	0–1	Bishop Auckland
9	Farnborough Town	4–1	Newbury Town
10	Gateshead	3–0	Billingham Synthonia
11	Grays Athletic	0–1	Aveley
12	Harwich & Parkeston	1–0	Great Yarmouth Town
13	Hendon	1–1	Aylesbury United
14	Hitchin Town	3–2	Bedford Town
15	Horden Colliery Welfare	0–0	Barrow
16	Kempston Rovers	0–2	Hayes
17	Kidderminster Harriers	2–1	Buckingham Town
18	King's Lynn	5–1	Hinckley Athletic
19	Maidenhead United	0–0	Addlestone & Weybridge Town
20	Maidstone United	2–0	Bromley
21	Marine	3–0	Chorley
22	Moor Green	0–2	Banbury United
23	Northwich Victoria	3–2	Alfreton Town
24	Penrith	1–0	Blue Star
25	Slough Town	0–1	Barton Rovers
26	St Albans City	2–1	Dulwich Hamlet
27	St Helens Town	0–1	Fleetwood Town
28	Stalybridge Celtic	0–0	Worksop Town
29	Sutton Coldfield Town	2–1	Witton Albion
30	Sutton United	4–1	Poole Town
31	Taunton Town	1–0	Falmouth Town
32	Ton Pentre	1–3	Bath City
33	Trowbridge Town	2–3	Bideford
34	Wembley	3–1	Chelmsford City
35	Windsor & Eton	1–1	Kingstonian
36	Worcester City	1–1	Barry Town

=== Replays ===
Tie	Home team	Score	Away team
4	Winsford United	1–3	Burton Albion
6	Canterbury City	3–3	Dover
13	Aylesbury United	1–0	Hendon
15	Barrow	2–3	Horden Colliery Welfare
19	Addlestone & Weybridge Town	5–0	Maidenhead United
28	Worksop Town	1–2	Stalybridge Celtic
35	Kingstonian	2–3	Windsor & Eton
36	Barry Town	2–3	Worcester City

=== 2nd replays ===
Tie	Home team	Score	Away team
6	Canterbury City	0–2	Dover

== 4th qualifying round ==
The teams given byes to this round are: AP Leamington, Barnet, Blyth Spartans, Morecambe, Enfield, Gravesend & Northfleet, Harlow Town, Wealdstone, Yeovil Town, Kettering Town, Nuneaton Borough, Stafford Rangers, Leatherhead, Barking, Merthyr Tydfil, Minehead, Runcorn, Weymouth, Wycombe Wanderers and Workington.

=== Ties ===
Tie	Home team	Score	Away team
1	A P Leamington	0–1	Barton Rovers
2	Addlestone & Weybridge Town	3–0	Bideford
3	Aylesbury United	1–1	Barnet
4	Blyth Spartans	7–0	Horden Colliery Welfare
5	Burscough	2–0	Morecambe
6	Burton Albion	1–0	Penrith
7	Corby Town	0–1	Boston United
8	Enfield	5–0	Epsom & Ewell
9	Fleetwood Town	1–0	Stalybridge Celtic
10	Gravesend & Northfleet	4–0	Aveley
11	Harlow Town	1–1	Wealdstone
12	Harwich & Parkeston	2–2	St Albans City
13	Hayes	1–1	Yeovil Town
14	Hitchin Town	0–1	Sutton Coldfield Town
15	Kettering Town	3–0	Banbury United
16	Kidderminster Harriers	1–0	Nuneaton Borough
17	King's Lynn	1–3	Stafford Rangers
18	Leatherhead	1–0	Bath City
19	Maidstone United	2–0	Barking
20	Marine	1–0	Gateshead (tie awarded to Gatehsead)
21	Merthyr Tydfil	0–1	Farnborough Town
22	Minehead	2–0	Sutton United
23	Northwich Victoria	2–1	Runcorn
24	Wembley	1–1	Dover
25	Weymouth	0–0	Taunton Town
26	Windsor & Eton	2–0	Gosport Borough
27	Worcester City	1–1	Wycombe Wanderers
28	Workington	4–1	Bishop Auckland

=== Replays ===
Tie	Home team	Score	Away team
3	Barnet	0–0	Aylesbury United
11	Wealdstone	0–1	Harlow Town
12	St Albans City	3–0	Harwich & Parkeston
13	Yeovil Town	2–0	Hayes
24	Dover	2–3	Wembley
25	Taunton Town	0–3	Weymouth
27	Wycombe Wanderers	1–0	Worcester City

=== 2nd replays ===
Tie	Home team	Score	Away team
3	Barnet	1–0	Aylesbury United

== 1980–81 FA Cup ==
See 1980-81 FA Cup for details of the rounds from the first round proper onwards.
