= Kiveton Park F.C. =

Association football club in England

Coordinates: 53.33977°N 1.25845°W

Kiveton Park
- Full name: Kiveton Park Football Club
- Founded: 1881
- Ground: Hard Lane
- Capacity: 1,000 (128 seats)
- Chairman: Chris Nelson
- Manager: Dan Stewart
- League: Sheffield & Hallamshire County Senior League Premier Division
- 2025–26: Sheffield & Hallamshire County Senior League Premier Division, 12th of 14
- Website: http://www.kivetonparkfc.com/
Home colours

Kiveton Park Football Club is a football club based in Kiveton Park, South Yorkshire, England. They are currently members of the Sheffield & Hallamshire County Senior League Premier Division and play their home games at Hard Lane.

== History ==
Although a team representing the village played two games with a side from Anston during the 1877–78 season, Kiveton Park FC was not formed until 1881. Two years later, the club affiliated with the Sheffield Football Association. Its first club colours were believed to be red and black quarters.

Sheffield Independent article from September 1883 announcing the club's affiliation with the Sheffield FA

In 1891–92 they were founder members of the Sheffield & District Football League (being Chesterfield F.C.'s first ever league opponents on the first day of that season) and lifted their first trophy after beating Sheepbridge in the final of the Sheffield Minor Cup.

For 1893–94 the Minor Cup changed from a knockout competition to a league, and Kiveton moved to join, also entering the Hatchard League at the same time. They were the first winners of the latter in 1894 and repeated the success two years later, remaining in the competition until the outbreak of the First World War.

Kiveton spent the majority of the time between the two world wars in the Sheffield Amateur League, with the exception of brief spells in the Sheffield Association League and the Holbrook & District League. They made their FA Cup debut in 1920, and reached the 3rd qualifying round of the competition two years later, losing to Rotherham Town at Clifton Lane. In 1923, the club was renamed as Kiveton Park Colliery, reflecting its close ties with the village pit.

The Kiveton Park team which won the 1914 Portland Challenge Cup

The club, like most others in the country, did initially break up when the Second World War broke out, but in 1942 they joined the Worksop & District League, remaining in this competition until the end of the war. The 1945–46 season saw the club come close to winning two prestigious competitions – going out in the semi-finals of the Sheffield & Hallamshire Senior Cup and finishing as runners-up in the Sheffield Invitation League play-offs, after beating Sheffield United reserves in the semi-final at Hard Lane.

They spent the first four post-war years in the Sheffield Association League, before joining the Yorkshire League in 1949. After suffering two disastrous campaigns at this higher level, they moved back to the Worksop & District League, where they were renamed as Kiveton Park United. They stayed in Worksop football until 1959, when they moved to the East Derbyshire League, and before long they were finding great success - in the 1961–62 season they won seven trophies. In 1963 the club successfully applied to re-join the Yorkshire League, and was accepted by the name of Kiveton Park.

A Kiveton Park programme cover from 1977

In 1967 they won promotion to Division One and two years later finished in third place – the club's highest ever league finish. A year later however they were relegated back to Division Two. In 1972 they completed a league and cup double, winning the prestigious Sheffield & Hallamshire Senior Cup for the first time, and gaining promotion back to the Yorkshire League's top flight. Their yo-yo existence would continue however – up to 1982 they flitted constantly between Division One and Two, winning the Division Two title in 1978.

A year after Kiveton reached the 4th Round of the FA Vase in 1981, the Yorkshire League merged with the Midland League to form the Northern Counties East League (NCEL), and Park were among the founder members of the new competition. They spent the first three years in Division Two South before being moved to Division One South when the competition went through a restructure in 1985, a year after the club's reserve team had won the last ever Wharncliffe Charity Cup final. They were promoted to Division One in 1986, but were relegated back again in 1990 because of ground grading issues. At the end of the 1990–91 season they left the NCEL to join the Central Midlands League (CMFL)

Park finished as Premier Division North runners-up in their first season, and a year later won promotion to the CMFL's Supreme Division. In 1994 the village's colliery closed, and two years later, after losing its biggest financier, the club went into hibernation. The club was reformed in 1999, re-joining the CMFL Premier Division. In 2003 they finished as runners-up, gaining promotion back to the Supreme Division, but were relegated back again two years later because of their failure to install floodlights. This blow came just days after they had won the Sheffield & Hallamshire Association Cup for the second year running. It wasn't until the league restructured in 2011 to form North and South divisions that the club regained Step 7 status in the English football league system.

In 2013 the club decided, due to the cost of travelling to away games, to leave the CMFL, and join the more local Sheffield & Hallamshire County Senior Football League (S&HCSL). Kiveton entered the Second Division of the S&HCSL for the start of the 2013–14 season. After four years in Division Two, Park won promotion to Division One of the S&HCSL in 2017, and in 2025 they returned to the eleventh tier of the pyramid after a twelve-year absence by winning the Division One title.

=== Season-by-season record ===
Season	Division	Level	Position	FA Cup	FA Amateur Cup	FA Vase	Notes
1891–92	Sheffield & District League	–	5th/10	–	–	–	
1892–93	Sheffield & District League	–	11th/14	–	–	–	
1893–94	Sheffield Minor Cup League (qualifying); Hatchard League	- -	4th/7 1st/8	–	–	–	League champions (won play-off)
1894–95	Sheffield Minor Cup League (qualifying); Sheffield Minor Cup League (proper)	- -	2nd/5 5th/7	–	–	–	
1895–96	Sheffield Minor Cup League (qualifying); Hatchard League	- -	3rd/7 1st/5	–	–	–	League champions (won play-off)
1896–97	Sheffield Alliance	–	4th/12	–	–	–	
1897–98	Sheffield Alliance	–		–	–	–	
1898–99	Club did not enter any competitions						
1899–1900	Hatchard League	–	1st/7	–	–	–	Lost league play-off
1900–01	Hatchard League	–		–	–	–	
1901–02	Hatchard League	–		–	–	–	
1902–03	Hatchard League	–	1st/8	–	–	–	Lost league play-off
1903–04	Hatchard League	–	2nd/11	–	–	–	
1904–05	Hatchard League	–	5th/13	–	–	–	
1905–06	Hatchard League	–		–	–	–	
1906–07	Hatchard League	–	10th/10	–	–	–	
1907–08	Hatchard League	–	3rd/10	–	–	–	
1908–09	Hatchard League	–	4th/9	–	–	–	
1909–10	Hatchard League	–		–	–	–	
1910–11	Hatchard League	–	2nd/9	–	–	–	
1911–12	Hatchard League	–		–	–	–	
1912–13	Hatchard League	–		–	–	–	
1913–14	Hatchard League	–		–	–	–	
1914–15	Hatchard League	–	6th/10	–	–	–	
1915–16	Club did not enter any competitions due to World War I						
1916–17	Club did not enter any competitions due to World War I						
1917–18	Club did not enter any competitions due to World War I						
1918–19	Club did not enter any competitions due to World War I						
1919–20	Hatchard League	–		–	–	–	
1920–21	Hatchard League	–	1st/9	PR	–	–	Lost league play-off
1921–22	Hatchard League	–	3rd/9	EPR	–	–	
1922–23	Hatchard League	–		3QR	–	–	
1923–24	Sheffield Minor League	–	2nd/13	–	–	–	League champions (won play-off)
1924–25	Sheffield Amateur League	–		–	–	–	
1925–26	Sheffield Association League	–	6th/13	–	–	–	
1926–27	Sheffield Association League	–		–	–	–	
1927–28	Sheffield Association League	–	7th/14	–	–	–	
1928–29	Sheffield Association League	–	7th/15	–	–	–	
1929–30	Sheffield Amateur League	–	11th/11	–	–	–	
1930–31	Sheffield Amateur League	–		–	–	–	
1931–32	Sheffield Amateur League	–		–	–	–	
1932–33	Sheffield Amateur League	–		–	–	–	
1933–34	Sheffield Amateur League	–		–	–	–	
1934–35	Holbrook & District League	–		–	–	–	
1935–36	Holbrook & District League	–	2nd/12	–	–	–	
1936–37	Holbrook & District League	–	1st/9	–	–	–	Lost league play-off
1937–38	Sheffield Amateur League	–		–	–	–	
1938–39	Sheffield Amateur League	–		–	–	–	
1939–40	Club did not enter any competitions due to World War II						
1940–41	Club did not enter any competitions due to World War II						
1941–42	Club did not enter any competitions due to World War II						
1942–43	Worksop & District League	–		–	–	–	
1943–44	Worksop & District League	–	2nd/13	–	–	–	
1944–45	Worksop & District League	–	1st/8	–	–	–	League champions (won play-off)
1945–46	Sheffield Association League	-	7th/10	–	–	–	
1946–47	Sheffield Association League	–	16th/20	PR	2QR	–	
1947–48	Sheffield Association League	–		PR	1QR	–	
1948–49	Sheffield Association League	–		PR	–	–	
1949–50	Yorkshire League Division 2	–	18th/18	EPR	–	–	
1950–51	Yorkshire League Division 2	–	15th/17	–	–	–	
1951–52	Worksop & District League	–	2nd/12	–	–	–	
1952–53	Worksop & District League	–	5th/10	–	–	–	
1953–54	Worksop & District League	–		–	–	–	
1954–55	Worksop & District League	–		–	–	–	
1955–56	Worksop & District League	–	5th/11	–	–	–	
1956–57	Worksop & District League	–	5th/7	–	–	–	
1957–58	Worksop & District League	–	5th/11	–	–	–	
1958–59	Sheffield Amateur League	–		–	–	–	
1959–60	East Derbyshire League	–	2nd/16	–	–	–	
1960–61	East Derbyshire League	–		–	–	–	
1961–62	East Derbyshire League	–	1st/12	–	–	–	League champions
1962–63	East Derbyshire League	–	1st/10	–	–	–	League champions
1963–64	Yorkshire League Division 2	–	8th/15	–	–	–	
1964–65	Yorkshire League Division 2	–	5th/15	–	–	–	
1965–66	Yorkshire League Division 2	–	4th/15	–	–	–	Promoted
1966–67	Yorkshire League Division 1	–	9th/17	–	–	–	
1967–68	Yorkshire League Division 1	–	5th/17	–	–	–	
1968–69	Yorkshire League Division 1	–	3rd/18	–	–	–	
1969–70	Yorkshire League Division 1	–	17th/18	PR	–	–	Relegated
1970–71	Yorkshire League Division 2	–	9th/14	–	–	–	
1971–72	Yorkshire League Division 2	–	3rd/15	–	–	–	Promoted
1972–73	Yorkshire League Division 1	–	11th/16	–	–	–	
1973–74	Yorkshire League Division 1	–	13th/16	–	–	–	Relegated
1974–75	Yorkshire League Division 2	–	7th/15	–	–	–	
1975–76	Yorkshire League Division 2	–	5th/15	–	–	2R	
1976–77	Yorkshire League Division 2	–	7th/16	–	–	1R	
1977–78	Yorkshire League Division 2	–	1st/15	–	–	PR	League champions, promoted
1978–79	Yorkshire League Division 1	–	15th/16	–	–	PR	Relegated
1979–80	Yorkshire League Division 2	–	3rd/16	–	–	2R	Promoted
1980–81	Yorkshire League Division 1	–	15th/16	–	–	4R	Relegated
1981–82	Yorkshire League Division 2	–	15th/16	–	–	1R	
1982–83	Northern Counties East League Division 2 South	–	7th/14	–	–	PR	
1983–84	Northern Counties East League Division 2 South	–	10th/13	–	–	1R	
1984–85	Northern Counties East League Division 1 South	–	12th/16	–	–	–	
1985–86	Northern Counties East League Division 2	–	8th/16	–	–	PR	Promoted
1986–87	Northern Counties East League Division 1	–	14th/18	–	–	EPR	
1987–88	Northern Counties East League Division 1	–	11th/16	–	–	EPR	
1988–89	Northern Counties East League Division 1	–	10th/16	–	–	1R	
1989–90	Northern Counties East League Division 1	–	8th/15	–	–	–	Relegated
1990–91	Northern Counties East League Division 2	–	10th/13	–	–	–	Transferred
1991–92	Central Midlands League Premier Division North	–	2nd/14	–	–	–	
1992–93	Central Midlands League Premier Division	–	3rd/19	–	–	–	Promoted
1993–94	Central Midlands League Supreme Division	–	3rd/17	–	–	–	
1994–95	Central Midlands League Supreme Division	–	7th/17	–	–	–	
1995–96	Central Midlands League Supreme Division	–	14th/17	–	–	–	
1996–97	Club did not enter any competitions						
1997–98	Club did not enter any competitions						
1998–99	Club did not enter any competitions						
1999–2000	Central Midlands League Premier Division	–	13th/16	–	–	–	
2000–01	Central Midlands League Premier Division	–	14th/17	–	–	–	
2001–02	Central Midlands League Premier Division	–	12th/20	–	–	–	
2002–03	Central Midlands League Premier Division	–	2nd/17	–	–	–	Promoted
2003–04	Central Midlands League Supreme Division	–	12th/19	–	–	–	
2004–05	Central Midlands League Supreme Division	11	15th/22	–	–	–	Relegated
2005–06	Central Midlands League Premier Division	12	12th/20	–	–	–	
2006–07	Central Midlands League Premier Division	12	9th/18	–	–	–	
2007–08	Central Midlands League Premier Division	12	5th/20	–	–	–	
2008–09	Central Midlands League Premier Division	12	9th/16	–	–	–	
2009–10	Central Midlands League Premier Division	12	14th/16	–	–	–	
2010–11	Central Midlands League Premier Division	12	6th/15	–	–	–	
2011–12	Central Midlands League North Division	11	9th/17	–	–	–	
2012–13	Central Midlands League North Division	11	8th/17	–	–	–	Transferred
2013–14	Sheffield & Hallamshire County Senior League Division 2	13	12th/13	–	–	–	
2014–15	Sheffield & Hallamshire County Senior League Division 2	13	10th/13	–	–	–	
2015–16	Sheffield & Hallamshire County Senior League Division 2	13	8th/11	–	–	–	
2016–17	Sheffield & Hallamshire County Senior League Division 2	13	3rd/12	–	–	–	Promoted
2017–18	Sheffield & Hallamshire County Senior League Division 1	12	4th/12	–	–	–	
2018–19	Sheffield & Hallamshire County Senior League Division 1	12	6th/13	–	–	–	
2019–20	Sheffield & Hallamshire County Senior League Division 1	12	–	–	–	–	Season abandoned due to COVID-19 pandemic
2020–21	Sheffield & Hallamshire County Senior League Division 1	12	–	–	–	–	Season abandoned due to COVID-19 pandemic
2021–22	Sheffield & Hallamshire County Senior League Division 1	12	6th/14	–	–	–	
2022–23	Sheffield & Hallamshire County Senior League Division 1	12	5th/13	–	–	–	
2023–24	Sheffield & Hallamshire County Senior League Division 1	12	7th/12	–	–	–	
2024–25	Sheffield & Hallamshire County Senior League Division 1	12	1st/13	–	–	–	Promoted
Season	Division	Level	Position	FA Cup	FA Amateur Cup	FA Vase	Notes
Source: Football Club History Database

=== Managers ===
From	To	Manager
	1967	John Wragg
1968	1969	George Jowett
1973	1975	Tommy Meecham
1975	1976	Tony Skelton
1976	1981	Paddy Buckley
1981	1982	Terry Stevenson
1982	1984	John Bilton

From	To	Manager
1984	1990	John Warnock
1990	1991	Jeff Sykes
1991	1994	Chas Mellon
1994	1996	Glyn Reeve
1999	2000	Tony Fowkes
2000	2007	Stuart Holmes

From	To	Manager
2007	2010	Wayne Burgin & Kevin Hull
2010	2013	Wayne Burgin & Bob Poad
2013	2022	Chris Nelson
2022	2023	Will Hutchison & Jon Barnes
2023	2024	Dan Stewart & Will Hutchison
2024		Dan Stewart

=== Notable former players ===
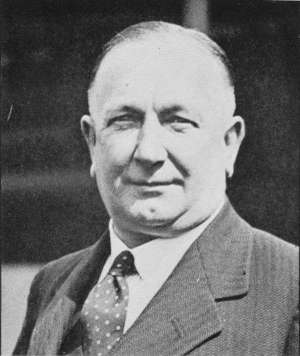
Herbert Chapman

Kiveton's most famous sons, Harry and Herbert Chapman, played for the club before going onto greater things – Harry became a Sheffield Wednesday legend while Herbert went on to become one of the most successful managers of all time. In 2004 the Sunday Times voted Herbert the greatest British manager ever, and in 2014 the club featured prominently in Patrick Barclay's book – The Life and Times of Herbert Chapman. Barclay wrote: "Kiveton Park could claim to have been a cradle of two revolutions, one industrial and the other sporting, and beyond question it is the birthplace of at least one great man, widely considered the father of football as we have come to know it."

Although Harry Chapman could claim to be the best player to hail from the village, he never won an international cap – although another Kivetonian did. Bert Morley played for England against Ireland in 1910, just six years after leaving his local football team.

In 1940, Empire News reported that, pro rata, the village had turned out more professional football players than anywhere in England apart from the Shropshire town of Oakengates.

== Grounds ==
The club's first home was a ground near Kiveton Park station later known as the Unbrako ground, and they also played at Wales Cricket Club (which was relocated to make room for the M1 motorway in 1960).

The club moved to a ground on Hard Lane just before the First World War. Initially Park played on the pitch nearest the road, but in the early 1960s a new pitch was laid out on an adjoining piece of land, and a stand was built in 1967 to hold 200 seated spectators.

After over a century at the ground, Kiveton left Hard Lane in 2017 to play on the grounds of Wales High School, and in 2022 a new floodlit artificial playing surface was opened. The grass pitches at the school were prone to waterlogging, and in 2024 the club moved its senior section back to Hard Lane

=== Gallery ===
The site of the club's first ground, near Kiveton Park station.

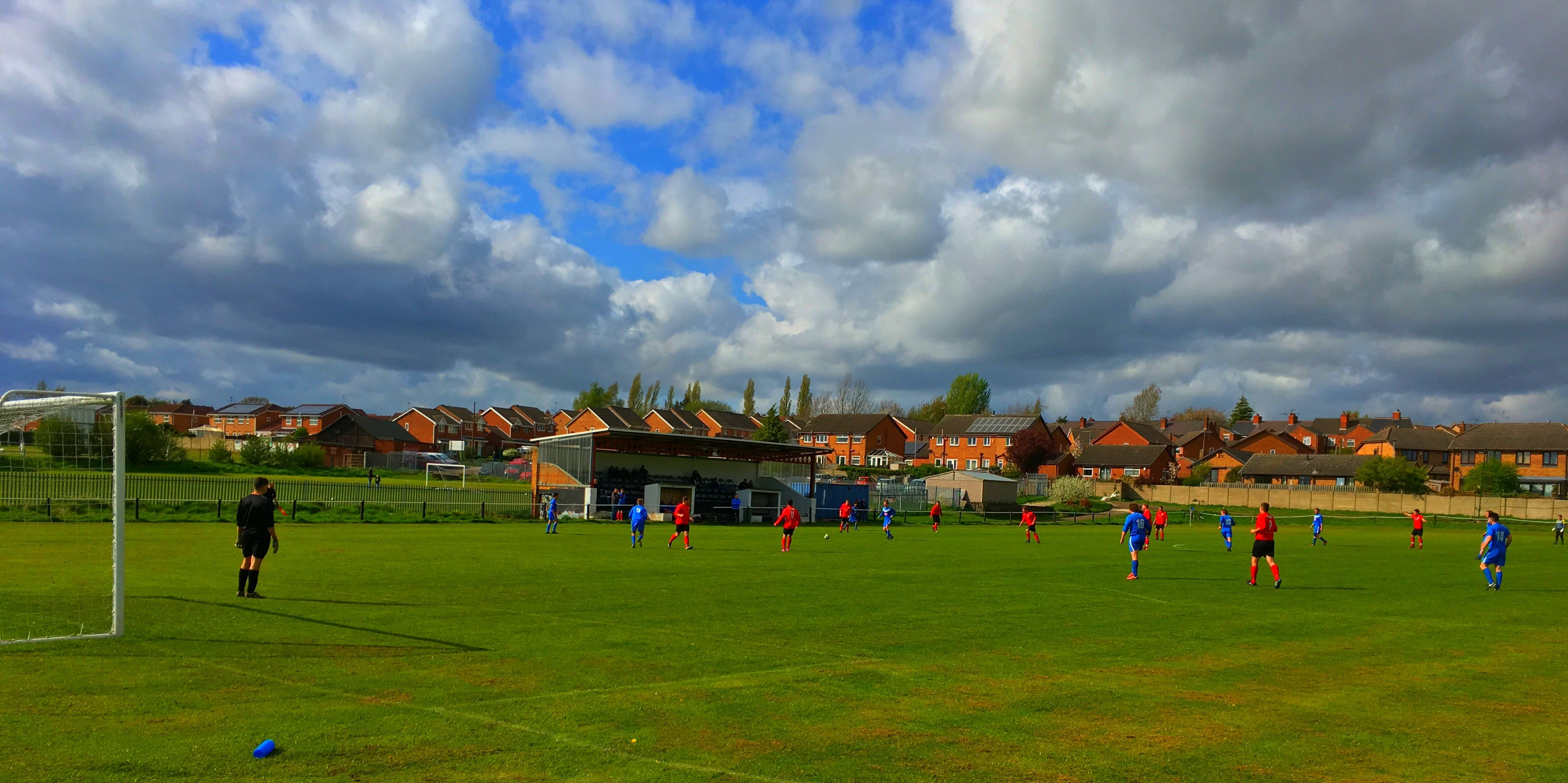
Kiveton Park vs. Sheffield Medics at Hard Lane ground in 2015.

Kiveton Park vs. Grimethorpe Sports at Wales High School in 2017.

== Honours ==
A match report from Kiveton's 1892 Sheffield Minor Cup win

=== League ===
- Hatchard League
  - 1893–94, 1895–96
- Portland Senior League
  - 1901–02, 1902–03
- East Derbyshire League
  - 1961–62, 1962–63
- Yorkshire League Division 2
  - 1977–78
- Sheffield & Hallamshire County Senior League Division 1
  - 2024–25

=== Cup ===
- Sheffield & Hallamshire Senior Cup
  - 1971–72
- Sheffield & Hallamshire Minor Cup
  - 1891–92
- Sheffield & Hallamshire Association Cup
  - 2004–05, 2005–06
- Aston-cum-Aughton Charity Cup
  - 1902–03, 1903–04, 1904–05, 1906–07, 1907–08
- Portland/Worksop Senior Cup
  - 1903–04, 1908–09, 1913–14, 1920–21, 1922–23, 1923–24, 1953–54
- East Derbyshire League Cup
  - 1960–61, 1961–62, 1962–63

== Records ==
- Best League performance: 3rd, Yorkshire League, 1968–69
- Best FA Cup performance: 3rd qualifying round, 1921–22
- Best FA Amateur Cup performance: 2nd qualifying round, 1946–47
- Best FA Vase performance: 4th Round, 1980–81
- Record attendance: 2,500 vs Bramley Sunnyside, Whitlam Memorial Cup final, 1961–62
