= Redfearn Sports F.C. =

Redfearn Sports
- Full name: Redfearn Sports Football Club
- Founded: (as Redfearns)

Redfearn Sports F.C. was an English football club based in Monk Bretton, South Yorkshire.

== History ==
It is not known when the club was first formed, but Redfearns F.C., representing the Redfearns Glassworks in Monk Bretton, entered the FA Cup on three occasions before the First World War. As a Barnsley League club, they changed name to Redfearn Sports F.C. and won the prestigious Sheffield & Hallamshire Senior Cup in 1969, beating Frickley Athletic at Denaby United's Tickhill Square ground. In 1973 they entered the Yorkshire Football League as Redfearn National Glass, and in their first season won the League Cup and promotion to the Second Division. A second successive promotion was earned in 1975, but the club withdrew from the league in 1977, returning to the Barnsley League.

In 1982 they won the Sheffield & Hallamshire Junior Cup, and were runners-up in the same competition in 1991, having reverted to being called Redfearn Sports. Soon after, the club disbanded.

=== League and cup history ===
Redfearn Sports League and Cup history
Season	Division	Position	FA Cup	FA Vase
1911–12			Preliminary round	–
1912–13			Preliminary round	-
1913–14			Preliminary round	-
1973–74	Yorkshire League Division 3	4th/16	–	–
1974–75	Yorkshire League Division 2	3rd/15	–	–
1975–76	Yorkshire League Division 1	8th/16	–	1st round
1976–77	Yorkshire League Division 1	13th/16	–	2nd round
1977–78			–	1st round

== Honours ==
=== League ===
- Yorkshire League Division Two
  - Runners-up: 1974–75
- Yorkshire League Division Three
  - Promoted: 1973–74

=== Cup ===
- Sheffield & Hallamshire Senior Cup
  - Winners: 1968–69
- Yorkshire Football League Cup
  - Winners: 1973–74

== Records ==
- Best FA Cup performance: Preliminary Round, 1911–12, 1912–13, 1913–14
- Best FA Vase performance: 2nd round, 1976–77
