= Sheffield Hallam University F.C. =

Association football club in England

Sheffield Hallam University
- Full name: Sheffield Hallam University Football Club
- League: BUSA Football League

Sheffield Hallam University F.C. is an English association football club based in Sheffield, South Yorkshire. The club is affiliated to the Sheffield & Hallamshire County Football Association

== History ==
=== League and cup history ===
Sheffield Hallam University League and Cup history
Season	Division	Position
1972–73	Yorkshire League Division 3	16th/16
1973–74	Yorkshire League Division 3	14th/16
