= Blackburn Welfare F.C. =

Blackburn Welfare
- Full name: Blackburn Welfare Football Club

Blackburn Welfare F.C. was an English football club located in Brough, East Riding of Yorkshire.

== History ==
The club joined the Yorkshire League in 1971, and spent four seasons in the competition's Third Division before re-joining local football.

== Records ==
- Best League performance: 7th, Yorkshire League Division 3, 1972–73
