= Woolley Miners Welfare F.C. =

Woolley Miners Welfare
- Full name: Woolley Miners Welfare Football Club

Woolley Miners Welfare F.C. was an English association football club based in Woolley, South Yorkshire.

== History ==
The club entered the Yorkshire League in 1971, and would win back-to-back promotions in their first two seasons to reach the top flight, before being relegated back down to Division 3 again by 1977.

In 1982 the Yorkshire League merged with the Midland League to form the Northern Counties East League, and Woolley were the first winners of the NCEL Division 2 South title. They spent the rest of their history in Division 1 and reached the final of the Sheffield & Hallamshire Senior Cup in 1989, before withdrawing from the NCEL and dissolving a year later.

=== League and cup history ===
Woolley MW League and Cup history
Season	Division	Position	FA Trophy	FA Vase
1971–72	Yorkshire League Division 3	4th/14	-	-
1972–73	Yorkshire League Division 2	2nd/16	1st Qualifying Round	-
1973–74	Yorkshire League Division 1	16th/16	2nd Qualifying Round	-
1974–75	Yorkshire League Division 2	11th/15	1st Qualifying Round	-
1975–76	Yorkshire League Division 2	6th/15	-	2nd Round
1976–77	Yorkshire League Division 2	15th/16	-	1st Round
1977–78	Yorkshire League Division 3	14th/16	-	Preliminary Round
1978–79	Yorkshire League Division 3	9th/15	-	-
1979–80	Yorkshire League Division 3	8th/14	-	-
1980–81	Yorkshire League Division 3	14th/16	-	Preliminary Round
1981–82	Yorkshire League Division 3	3rd/15	-	-
1982–83	Northern Counties East League Division 2 South	1st/14	-	1st Round
1983–84	Northern Counties East League Division 1 South	3rd/14	-	1st Round
1984–85	Northern Counties East League Division 1 Central	3rd/16	-	Preliminary Round
1985–86	Northern Counties East League Division 1	9th/16	-	Preliminary Round
1986–87	Northern Counties East League Division 1	13th/18	-	1st Round
1987–88	Northern Counties East League Division 1	6th/16	-	1st Round
1988–89	Northern Counties East League Division 1	3rd/16	-	-
1989–90	Northern Counties East League Division 1	4th/15	-	-

== Honours ==
=== League ===
- Yorkshire League Division 2
  - Promoted: 1972–73
- Yorkshire League Division 3
  - Promoted: 1971–72
- Northern Counties East League Division 2 South
  - Promoted: 1982–83 (champions)

=== Cup ===
- Sheffield & Hallamshire Senior Cup
  - Runners-up: 1988–89

== Records ==
- Best FA Trophy performance – 2nd Qualifying round, 1973/74
- Best FA Vase performance – 2nd Round, 1975/76
