= Brook Sports F.C. =

Brooks Sports Football Club
- Dissolved: 1985

Brooks Sports F.C. was an English football club based in Dewsbury, West Yorkshire.

== History ==
The team participated in the Yorkshire Football League, Northern Counties East League and FA Vase.
