= Barton Town F.C. (1880) =

Barton Town
- Full name: Barton Town Football Club
- Nickname(s): Swans
- Founded: 1880
- Dissolved: 1995
- 1980–81: Yorkshire League; Division One, 11th of 16

Barton Town Football Club was a football club based in Barton-upon-Humber, Lincolnshire, England. The club was formed in 1880 and merged with Barton Old Boys in 1995 to form Barton Town Old Boys.

== History ==
Barton Town was formed in 1880, moving to the Marsh Lane ground in 1927. The club were founder members of the Lincolnshire League. They finished bottom of the league in 1956–57 but were runners-up in 1959–60 and then champions in 1960–61. In 1964 the club joined Division Two of the Yorkshire League. They were Division Two runners-up in their first season in the league, earning promotion to Division One. In 1968 the club transferred to the Midland League, before rejoining Division One of the Yorkshire League two seasons later. They finished second-from-bottom of Division One in 1970–71 and were relegated to Division Two. However, they won Division Two the following season and were promoted back to Division One.

In 1973–74 Barton finished third-from-bottom of Division One and were relegated to Division Two again. They were Division Two champions in 1979–80, earning promotion back to Division One. However, they left the league at the end of the 1980–81 season to rejoin the Lincolnshire League. They subsequently won the Division One title in 1981–82. The club remained in the Lincolnshire League for the next ten years before dropping out due to lack of resources and finance. They merged with Barton Old Boys in 1995 to form Barton Town Old Boys.

== Honours ==
- Yorkshire League
  - Division Two champions 1971–72, 1979–80
- Lincolnshire League
  - Champions 1960–61, 1981–82

== Records ==
- Best FA Cup performance: Third qualifying round, 1931–32, 1967–68, 1980–81
- Best FA Trophy performance: Third qualifying round, 1971–72, 1972–73
- Best FA Vase performance: Fourth round, 1979–80

== See also ==
- Barton Town F.C. (1880) players
