= St John's College (York) F.C. =

St John's College (York)
- Full name: St John's College (York) Football Club

St John's College (York) Football Club was an English football club based in York.

== History ==
The club joined the Yorkshire Football League in 1970, and spent seven seasons in the competition – all of them in the bottom Third Division.
