= International Harvesters F.C. =

International Harvesters
- Full name: International Harvesters Football Club

International Harvesters F.C. was an English football club located in Doncaster, South Yorkshire.

== History ==
The club joined the Yorkshire League in 1970. They spent five years in the competition, but rarely troubled the top places in the Division Three table. In 1975 they withdrew from the Yorkshire League and returned to play in the Doncaster & District Senior League.
