= Leeds Ashley Road F.C. =

Leeds Ashley Road Football Club
- Dissolved: 1983
- Ground: Templenewsam Road

Leeds Ashley Road F.C. was an English football club based in Leeds, West Yorkshire.

== History ==
The team participated in the Yorkshire Football League, Northern Counties East League and FA Vase.
