= Leeds Carnegie F.C. =

Former association football club in England

Leeds Carnegie
- Full name: Leeds Carnegie Football Club
- Nickname: The Met
- Founded: 1970 (as Leeds & Carnegie College)
- Dissolved: 2011
- Ground: Throstle Nest; Farsley; Leeds (Groundshare with Farsley A.F.C.)
- Capacity: 3900 (500 Seated)
- Chairman: Malcolm Brown
- Manager: John Hall
- League: Northern Counties East League Division One
- 2010–11: Northern Counties East League Division One, 11th
Home colours	Away colours

Leeds Carnegie F.C. was an English football club based in Farsley, Leeds, West Yorkshire. They were established in 1970 and were affiliated with Leeds Metropolitan University and disbanded in 2011.

== History ==
The club was founded in 1970 as Leeds & Carnegie College F.C., they were entered into the Yorkshire Football League Division Three during that year and were promoted during their debut season. Leeds & Carnegie were promoted as Yorkshire League Division Two champions in 1972–73 and would stay in the league system until 1979. They had a decent run in the FA Vase during the 1976–77 season, before going out to Newcastle Blue Star 1–0 in the fourth round.

During 1980, the club were entered into the Northern Universities League, they went under the name Leeds Polytechnic for much of this period, winning the Premier Division of this set-up a total of nine times. The name of the club was changed to Leeds Met Carnegie during the early part of the 1990s.

=== Final years ===
In 2004, Leeds Met left the Northern Universities League for the West Yorkshire League, which is a part of the English football pyramid. The club were victorious and were crowned champions of the league's Premier Division in 2005–06, however due to not having a ground up to the standards of the division above, they were not promoted.

However, after some re-organising after the 2006–07 season, the club were accepted into the Northern Counties East League Division One which lies at level 10 on the English football pyramid. They shared the Throstle Nest ground of Farsley A.F.C. who currently play in the National League North.

Prior to the club's dissolution, one of their final managers was Graham Potter, who went on to become manager of Premier League teams Brighton & Hove Albion, Chelsea and West Ham.

== Records ==
=== Leeds & Carnegie College FC ===
- Best FA Trophy performance: Third qualifying round, 1974–75
- Best FA Amateur Cup performance: Second round, 1968–69, 1969–70, 1972–73, 1973–74

=== Leeds & Carnegie Polytechnic FC ===
- Best FA Vase performance: Fourth round, 1976–77

=== Leeds Met Carnegie FC ===
- Best FA Vase performance: First qualifying round, 2007–08

=== Leeds Carnegie FC ===
- Best FA Cup performance: Extra preliminary round, 2008–09, 2009–10 (replay), 2010–11 (replay)
- Best FA Vase performance: Third round, 2010–11

== Honours ==
- Yorkshire League Division Two
  - Champions: 1972–73
- Yorkshire League Division Three
  - Champions: 1970–71
- West Yorkshire League Premier Division
  - Champions: 2005–06
- Northern Universities League
  - Champions: 1980–81, 1981–82, 1982–83, 1988–89, 1991–92, 1994–95, 2000–01, 2002–03, 2003–04
