= 1988–89 Northern Counties East Football League =

The 1988–89 Northern Counties East Football League season was the 7th in the history of Northern Counties East Football League, a football competition in England.

== Premier Division ==
Northern Counties East Football League Premier Division
- Season: 1988–89
- Champions: Emley
- Promoted: Emley
- Matches: 272
- Goals: 822 (3.02 per match)

The Premier Division featured 17 clubs which competed in the previous season, no new clubs joined the division this season.

=== League table ===
Pos	Team	Pld	W	D	L	GF	GA	GD	Pts	Promotion or relegation
1	Emley	32	25	5	2	80	18	+62	80	Promoted to the Northern Premier League Division One
2	Hatfield Main	32	21	9	2	67	24	+43	72	
3	Bridlington Town	32	21	5	6	67	26	+41	68	
4	North Ferriby United	32	17	9	6	63	31	+32	60	
5	Guiseley	32	16	10	6	50	27	+23	58	
6	Denaby United	32	13	7	12	52	50	+2	46	
7	Pontefract Collieries	32	10	11	11	37	34	+3	41	
8	Harrogate Railway Athletic	32	10	11	11	41	43	−2	41	
9	Thackley	32	11	6	15	43	59	−16	39	
10	Belper Town	32	9	10	13	45	51	−6	37	
11	Armthorpe Welfare	32	9	9	14	44	60	−16	36	
12	Hallam	32	9	5	18	47	77	−30	32	
13	Long Eaton United	32	8	7	17	32	54	−22	31	Resigned to the Central Midlands League
14	Brigg Town	32	8	7	17	43	66	−23	31	
15	Grimethorpe Miners Welfare	32	8	5	19	38	59	−21	29	
16	Bridlington Trinity	32	6	7	19	40	72	−32	25	
17	Ossett Albion	32	5	9	18	33	71	−38	24	

Source: fchd
Rules for classification: 1) points; 2) goal difference; 3) number of goals scored.

=== Map ===
Location of the clubs in the 1988–89 NCEL Premier Division on a map of Yorkshire and the Humber
Location of the clubs in the 1988–89 NCEL Premier Division on a map of the East Midlands

== Division One ==
Northern Counties East Football League Division One
- Season: 1988–89
- Champions: Sheffield
- Promoted: Sheffield
- Relegated: Bradley Rangers; Pilkington Recreation
- Matches: 240
- Goals: 682 (2.84 per match)

Division One featured 14 clubs which competed in the previous season, along with two new clubs, promoted from Division Two:

- Collingham
- Pickering Town

=== League table ===
Pos	Team	Pld	W	D	L	GF	GA	GD	Pts	Promotion or relegation
1	Sheffield	30	21	5	4	76	25	+51	68	Promoted to the Premier Division
2	Rowntree Mackintosh	30	18	6	6	68	36	+32	60	
3	Woolley Miners Welfare	30	16	11	3	49	28	+21	59	
4	Maltby Miners Welfare	30	17	5	8	68	38	+30	56	
5	Pickering Town	30	16	4	10	58	54	+4	52	
6	Garforth Town	30	15	5	10	56	34	+22	50	
7	Eccleshill United	30	15	4	11	47	39	+8	49	
8	Collingham	30	14	5	11	38	30	+8	47	
9	Immingham Town	30	12	10	8	39	31	+8	46	
10	Kiveton Park	30	11	1	18	30	44	−14	34	
11	Mexborough Town	30	8	7	15	28	40	−12	31	
12	BSC Parkgate	30	8	6	16	29	54	−25	30	
13	Frecheville Community Association	30	6	11	13	31	44	−13	29	
14	York Railway Institute	30	6	10	14	25	37	−12	28	
15	Bradley Rangers	30	6	3	21	22	62	−40	21	Relegated to Division Two
16	Pilkington Recreation	30	3	3	24	18	86	−68	12	Relegated to Division Two

Source: fchd
Rules for classification: 1) points; 2) goal difference; 3) number of goals scored.

=== Map ===
Location of the clubs in the 1988–89 NCEL Division One on a map of Yorkshire and the Humber

== Division Two ==
Northern Counties East Football League Division Two
- Season: 1988–89
- Champions: Ossett Town
- Promoted: Ossett Town; Liversedge
- Matches: 182
- Goals: 604 (3.32 per match)

Division One featured 12 clubs which competed in the previous season, along with two new clubs:

- Brodsworth Miners Welfare, joined from Doncaster Senior League
- Dronfield United, relegated from Division One

=== League table ===
Pos	Team	Pld	W	D	L	GF	GA	GD	Pts	Promotion or relegation
1	Ossett Town	26	19	3	4	76	17	+59	60	Promoted to Division One
2	Liversedge	26	16	4	6	52	24	+28	52	Promoted to Division One
3	Selby Town	26	15	5	6	54	35	+19	50	
4	Worsbrough Bridge Miners Welfare	26	14	5	7	64	41	+23	47	
5	Glasshoughton Welfare	26	14	3	9	52	36	+16	45	
6	Dronfield United	26	11	7	8	39	36	+3	40	
7	Hall Road Rangers	26	10	4	12	44	60	−16	34	
8	Yorkshire Main	26	9	5	12	45	46	−1	32	
9	Stocksbridge Park Steels	26	8	6	12	37	52	−15	30	
10	Tadcaster Albion	26	8	6	12	30	46	−16	30	
11	Winterton Rangers	26	8	6	12	37	63	−26	30	
12	Brodsworth Miners Welfare	26	6	8	12	21	43	−22	26	
13	Yorkshire Amateur	26	6	3	17	30	55	−25	21	
14	Fryston Colliery Welfare	26	3	5	18	23	50	−27	14	

Source: fchd
Rules for classification: 1) points; 2) goal difference; 3) number of goals scored.

=== Map ===
Location of the clubs in the 1988–89 NCEL Division Two on a map of Yorkshire and the Humber
