= 1980–81 Yorkshire Football League =

The 1980–81 Yorkshire Football League was the 55th season in the history of the Yorkshire Football League, a football competition in England.

== Division One ==
Yorkshire Football League Division One
- Season: 1980–81
- Champions: Leeds Ashley Road
- Relegated: Bridlington Town; Kiveton Park; Maltby Miners Welfare
- Matches: 240
- Goals: 662 (2.76 per match)

Division One featured 12 clubs which competed in the previous season, along with four new clubs, promoted from Division Two:

- Barton Town
- Bentley Victoria Welfare
- Kiveton Park
- Maltby Miners Welfare

=== League table ===
Pos	Team	Pld	W	D	L	GF	GA	GD	Pts	Qualification or relegation
1	Leeds Ashley Road	30	18	8	4	58	25	+33	44	
2	Emley	30	17	8	5	61	36	+25	42	
3	North Ferriby United	30	16	8	6	40	23	+17	40	
4	Thackley	30	14	7	9	48	39	+9	35	
5	Guiseley	30	10	12	8	48	41	+7	32	
6	Winterton Rangers	30	12	8	10	35	31	+4	32	
7	Scarborough reserves	30	13	5	12	55	49	+6	31	
8	Frecheville Community Association	30	10	11	9	41	38	+3	31	
9	Hallam	30	11	7	12	42	39	+3	29	
10	Liversedge	30	11	7	12	35	49	−14	29	
11	Barton Town	30	8	10	12	39	41	−2	26	Resigned to the Lincolnshire League
12	Sheffield	30	9	8	13	24	41	−17	26	
13	Bentley Victoria Welfare	30	9	7	14	47	47	0	25	
14	Maltby Miners Welfare	30	9	7	14	37	41	−4	25	Relegated to Division Two
15	Kiveton Park	30	9	7	14	40	50	−10	25	Relegated to Division Two
16	Bridlington Town	30	1	6	23	12	72	−60	8	Relegated to Division Two

Source: fchd
Rules for classification: 1) points; 2) goal difference; 3) number of goals scored.
The points system until the 1990–91 season: 2 points for a win, 1 point for a draw and 0 points for losing.

=== Map ===
Location of the clubs in the 1980–81 Yorkshire League Division One on a map of Yorkshire and the Humber

== Division Two ==
Yorkshire Football League Division Two
- Season: 1980–81
- Champions: Ossett Albion
- Promoted: Farsley Celtic; Lincoln United; Ossett Albion; York Railway Institute
- Matches: 240
- Goals: 641 (2.67 per match)

Division Two featured eight clubs which competed in the previous season, along with eight new clubs.

- Clubs relegated from Division One:
  - Fryston Colliery Welfare
  - Ossett Albion
  - Ossett Town
  - Thorne Colliery
- Clubs promoted from Division Three:
  - Garforth Miners
  - Hall Road Rangers
  - Pilkington Recreation
  - Rawmarsh Welfare

=== League table ===
Pos	Team	Pld	W	D	L	GF	GA	GD	Pts	Qualification or relegation
1	Ossett Albion	30	15	8	7	46	30	+16	38	Promoted to Division One
2	York Railway Institute	30	13	10	7	52	46	+6	36	Promoted to Division One
3	Lincoln United	30	10	14	6	48	40	+8	34	Promoted to Division One
4	Farsley Celtic	30	12	10	8	36	28	+8	34	Promoted to Division One
5	Garforth Miners	30	12	9	9	49	42	+7	33	
6	Pilkington Recreation	30	12	9	9	48	42	+6	33	
7	BSC Parkgate	30	11	9	10	31	35	−4	31	
8	Harworth Colliery Institute	30	10	10	10	46	40	+6	30	
9	Norton Woodseats	30	11	7	12	34	31	+3	29	
10	Yorkshire Amateur	30	8	13	9	36	40	−4	29	
11	Hall Road Rangers	30	7	14	9	37	44	−7	28	
12	Ossett Town	30	11	5	14	37	41	−4	27	
13	Fryston Colliery Welfare	30	11	5	14	34	40	−6	27	
14	Hatfield Main	30	8	11	11	36	43	−7	27	
15	Thorne Colliery	30	9	5	16	44	53	−9	23	Relegated to Division Three
16	Rawmarsh Welfare	30	4	13	13	27	46	−19	21	Relegated to Division Three

Source: fchd
Rules for classification: 1) points; 2) goal difference; 3) number of goals scored.
The points system until the 1990–91 season: 2 points for a win, 1 point for a draw and 0 points for losing.

=== Map ===
Location of the clubs in the 1980–81 Yorkshire League Division Two on a map of Yorkshire and the Humber

== Division Three ==
Yorkshire Football League Division Three
- Season: 1980–81
- Champions: Bradley Rangers
- Promoted: Bradley Rangers; Grimethorpe Miners Welfare; Harrogate Town
- Matches: 240
- Goals: 724 (3.02 per match)

Division Three featured nine clubs which competed in the previous season, along with seven new clubs.

- Clubs relegated from Division Two:
  - Brook Sports
  - Denaby United
  - Stocksbridge Works
  - Tadcaster Albion
- Plus:
  - Bradley Rangers, joined from the West Yorkshire League
  - Grimethorpe Miners Welfare, joined from Doncaster & District Senior League
  - Harrogate Railway Athletic, joined from Harrogate & District League

Also, Sheffield Water Works changed name to Yorkshire Water Authority (Southern).

=== League table ===
Pos	Team	Pld	W	D	L	GF	GA	GD	Pts	Qualification or relegation
1	Bradley Rangers	30	20	4	6	68	33	+35	44	Promoted to Division Two
2	Harrogate Town	30	20	4	6	64	31	+33	44	Promoted to Division Two
3	Yorkshire Water Authority (Southern)	30	18	5	7	59	29	+30	41	Resigned from the league
4	Grimethorpe Miners Welfare	30	14	9	7	54	29	+25	37	Promoted to Division Two
5	Stocksbridge Works	30	16	5	9	56	44	+12	37	
6	Denaby United	30	14	8	8	55	36	+19	36	
7	Worsbrough Bridge Miners Welfare Athletic	30	14	8	8	57	49	+8	36	
8	Pickering Town	30	12	10	8	43	34	+9	34	
9	Pontefract Collieries	30	13	8	9	48	41	+7	34	
10	Harrogate Railway Athletic	30	10	5	15	30	38	−8	25	
11	Tadcaster Albion	30	9	6	15	46	52	−6	24	
12	Wombwell Sporting Association	30	7	10	13	33	49	−16	24	
13	Brook Sports	30	6	9	15	30	51	−21	21	
14	Woolley Miners Welfare	30	6	5	19	34	61	−27	17	
15	Collingham	30	4	6	20	21	56	−35	14	
16	Selby Town	30	4	4	22	26	91	−65	12	

Source: fchd
Rules for classification: 1) points; 2) goal difference; 3) number of goals scored.
The points system until the 1990–91 season: 2 points for a win, 1 point for a draw and 0 points for losing.

=== Map ===
Location of the clubs in the 1980–81 Yorkshire League Division Three on a map of Yorkshire and the Humber

== League Cup ==
1980–81 Yorkshire Football League League Cup
Tournament details
- Country: England

Final positions
- Champions: Winterton Rangers
- Runners-up: Emley

=== Final ===
Winterton Rangers	2–0	Emley
