= 1985–86 Northern Counties East Football League =

The 1985–86 Northern Counties East Football League season was the 4th in the history of Northern Counties East Football League, a football competition in England.

At the end of the previous season divisions One North, One Central and One South was reorganised. The clubs were distributed between newly formed divisions One, Two and Three.

Division Three was disbanded at the end of the season. Most of the Division Three clubs were promoted to Division Two.

== Premier Division ==
Northern Counties East Football League Premier Division
- Season: 1985–86
- Champions: Arnold
- Matches: 380
- Goals: 1,181 (3.11 per match)

The Premier Division featured 17 clubs which competed in the previous season, along with three new clubs:

- Armthorpe Welfare, promoted from Division One Central
- Farsley Celtic, promoted from Division One North
- Long Eaton United, promoted from Division One South

=== League table ===
Pos	Team	Pld	W	D	L	GF	GA	GD	Pts	Promotion or relegation
1	Arnold	38	24	8	6	83	36	+47	79 (Note: Arnold, Eastwood Town, Denaby United and Heanor Town were deducted 1 point.)	Resigned to the Central Midlands League
2	Emley	38	22	11	5	77	47	+30	77	
3	Guiseley	38	22	6	10	81	52	+29	72	
4	Long Eaton United	38	19	11	8	70	39	+31	68	
5	Eastwood Town	38	21	5	12	73	62	+11	67	
6	Alfreton Town	38	21	2	15	66	47	+19	65	
7	Sutton Town	38	18	6	14	69	57	+12	60	
8	Farsley Celtic	38	14	12	12	71	55	+16	54	
9	Belper Town	38	15	9	14	54	45	+9	54	
10	Thackley	38	14	11	13	52	58	−6	53	
11	Denaby United	38	13	14	11	63	56	+7	52	
12	Pontefract Collieries	38	15	7	16	55	54	+1	52	
13	Armthorpe Welfare	38	15	7	16	57	58	−1	52	
14	Bentley Victoria Welfare	38	12	11	15	61	65	−4	47	
15	Heanor Town	38	11	9	18	61	69	−8	41	Resigned to the Central Midlands League
16	Spalding United	38	9	12	17	41	62	−21	39	Transferred to the United Counties League
17	Boston	38	10	6	22	42	79	−37	36	
18	Appleby Frodingham	38	6	12	20	40	83	−43	30	Club folded
19	Bridlington Trinity	38	4	14	20	34	85	−51	26	
20	Ilkeston Town	38	5	7	26	31	72	−41	22	Resigned to the Central Midlands League

Source: fchd
Rules for classification: 1) points; 2) goal difference; 3) number of goals scored.

=== Map ===
Location of the clubs in the 1985–86 NCEL Premier Division on a map of Yorkshire and the Humber
Location of the clubs in the 1985–86 NCEL Premier Division on a map of the East Midlands (ET = Eastwood Town, HT = Heanor Town)

== Division One ==
Northern Counties East Football League Division One
- Season: 1985–86
- Champions: North Ferriby United
- Promoted: Bridlington Town; Brigg Town; Harrogate Town; North Ferriby United
- Matches: 240
- Goals: 795 (3.31 per match)

At the end of the previous season divisions One North, One South and One Central was reorganised. The clubs were distributed between newly formed divisions One, Two and Three. Division One consisted of 16 clubs.

- Clubs transferred from Division One North:
  - Bradley Rangers
  - Bridlington Town
  - Harrogate Railway Athletic
  - Harrogate Town
  - North Ferriby United
  - Rowntree Mackintosh
- Clubs transferred from Division One Central:
  - Brigg Town
  - Hatfield Main
  - Ossett Albion
  - Pilkington Recreation
  - Woolley Miners Welfare
- Clubs transferred from Division One South:
  - Borrowash Victoria
  - Dronfield United
  - Harworth Colliery Institute
  - Sheffield
- Plus:
  - Mexborough Town Athletic, relegated from the Premier Division

=== League table ===
Pos	Team	Pld	W	D	L	GF	GA	GD	Pts	Promotion or relegation
1	North Ferriby United	30	18	5	7	54	31	+23	59	Promoted to the Premier Division
2	Sheffield	30	16	8	6	54	39	+15	56	
3	Harrogate Town	30	16	6	8	65	42	+23	54	Promoted to the Premier Division
4	Rowntree Mackintosh	30	16	5	9	67	45	+22	53	
5	Ossett Albion	30	13	11	6	54	39	+15	50	
6	Bridlington Town	30	11	13	6	49	41	+8	46	Promoted to the Premier Division
7	Borrowash Victoria	30	12	10	8	53	48	+5	46	Resigned to the Central Midlands League
8	Harworth Colliery Institute	30	12	6	12	51	50	+1	42	Resigned to the Central Midlands League
9	Woolley Miners Welfare	30	12	7	11	59	59	0	42 (Note: Woolley Miners Welfare, Mexborough Town Athletic, Harrogate Railway Athletic and Dronfield United were deducted 1 point.)	
10	Bradley Rangers	30	12	4	14	51	51	0	40	
11	Hatfield Main	30	8	13	9	57	43	+14	37	
12	Brigg Town	30	8	8	14	31	42	−11	32	Promoted to the Premier Division
13	Mexborough Town Athletic	30	8	7	15	39	68	−29	30	
14	Harrogate Railway Athletic	30	6	6	18	47	70	−23	23	
15	Dronfield United	30	6	6	18	32	61	−29	23	
16	Pilkington Recreation	30	4	9	17	32	66	−34	21	

Source: fchd
Rules for classification: 1) points; 2) goal difference; 3) number of goals scored.

=== Map ===
Location of the clubs in the 1985–86 NCEL Division One on a map of Yorkshire and the Humber
Location of the clubs in the 1985–86 NCEL Division One on a map of the East Midlands

== Division Two ==
Northern Counties East Football League Division Two
- Season: 1985–86
- Champions: Lincoln United
- Promoted: Garforth Town; York Railway Institute; Hallam; Staveley Works; Maltby Miners Welfare; Grimethorpe Miners Welfare; Kiveton Park; BSC Parkgate
- Matches: 240
- Goals: 755 (3.15 per match)

At the end of the previous season divisions One North, One South and One Central was reorganised. The clubs were distributed between newly formed divisions One, Two and Three. Division Two consisted of 16 clubs.

- Clubs transferred from Division One North:
  - Garforth Miners, who also changed name to Garforth Town
  - Liversedge
  - Pickering Town
  - York Railway Institute
- Clubs transferred from Division One Central:
  - Grimethorpe Miners Welfare
  - Maltby Miners Welfare
  - Ossett Town
  - BSC Parkgate
  - Thorne Colliery
  - Yorkshire Main
- Clubs transferred from Division One South:
  - Arnold Kingswell
  - Frecheville Community
  - Hallam
  - Kiveton Park
  - Lincoln United
  - Staveley Works

=== League table ===
Pos	Team	Pld	W	D	L	GF	GA	GD	Pts	Promotion or relegation
1	Lincoln United	30	20	5	5	73	29	+44	65	Resigned to the Central Midlands League
2	Garforth Town	30	20	4	6	66	29	+37	64	Promoted to Division One
3	York Railway Institute	30	17	5	8	58	39	+19	56	Promoted to Division One
4	Staveley Works	30	17	4	9	52	33	+19	55	Promoted to Division One
5	Hallam	30	15	2	13	48	42	+6	47	Promoted to Division One
6	Maltby Miners Welfare	30	12	7	11	44	48	−4	43	Promoted to Division One
7	Grimethorpe Miners Welfare	30	12	7	11	50	48	+2	42 (Note: Grimethorpe Miners Welfare were deducted 3 points.)	Promoted to Division One
8	Kiveton Park	30	11	6	13	42	48	−6	39	Promoted to Division One
9	BSC Parkgate	30	11	7	12	43	50	−7	39 (Note: BSC Parkgate, Yorkshire Main, Pickering Town, Thorne Colliery were deducted 1 point.)	Promoted to Division One
10	Liversedge	30	11	5	14	46	56	−10	38	
11	Frecheville Community Association	30	9	8	13	43	61	−18	35	
12	Arnold Kingswell	30	10	4	16	48	57	−9	34	Resigned to the Central Midlands League
13	Yorkshire Main	30	10	5	15	38	53	−15	34	
14	Ossett Town	30	8	7	15	40	53	−13	31	
15	Pickering Town	30	5	10	15	33	52	−19	24	
16	Thorne Colliery	30	7	4	19	31	57	−26	24	Resigned to the Doncaster & District Senior League

Source: fchd
Rules for classification: 1) points; 2) goal difference; 3) number of goals scored.

=== Map ===
Location of the clubs in the 1985–86 NCEL Division Two on a map of Yorkshire and the Humber
Location of the clubs in the 1985–86 NCEL Division Two on a map of the East Midlands

== Division Three ==
Northern Counties East Football League Division Three
- Season: 1985–86
- Champions: Collingham
- Promoted: 11 clubs
- Matches: 182
- Goals: 586 (3.22 per match)

At the end of the previous season divisions One North, One South and One Central was reorganised. The clubs were distributed between newly formed divisions One, Two and Three. Division Three consisted of 14 clubs.

- Clubs transferred from Division One North:
  - Collingham
  - Hall Road Rangers
  - Selby Town
  - Tadcaster Albion
  - Yorkshire Amateur
- Clubs transferred from Division One Central:
  - Fryston Colliery Welfare
  - Stocksbridge Works
  - Wombwell Sporting Association
  - Worsbrough Bridge Miners Welfare
- Clubs transferred from Division One South:
  - Graham Street Prims
  - Kimberley Town
  - Oakham United
- Plus:
  - Eccleshill United, joined from the West Riding County Amateur Football League
  - Glasshoughton Welfare, joined from the West Yorkshire Association Football League

=== League table ===
Pos	Team	Pld	W	D	L	GF	GA	GD	Pts	Promotion or relegation
1	Collingham	26	16	7	3	66	23	+43	55	Promoted to Division Two
2	Worsbrough Bridge Miners Welfare	26	14	5	7	60	32	+28	47	Promoted to Division Two
3	Eccleshill United	26	13	6	7	43	34	+9	45	Promoted to Division Two
4	Glasshoughton Welfare	26	12	7	7	42	33	+9	43	Promoted to Division Two
5	Yorkshire Amateur	26	11	10	5	38	29	+9	42 (Note: Yorkshire Amateur were deducted 1 point.)	Promoted to Division Two
6	Hall Road Rangers	26	9	9	8	37	33	+4	36	Promoted to Division Two
7	Oakham United	26	10	6	10	38	35	+3	36	Resigned to the Central Midlands League
8	Graham Street Prims	26	10	5	11	43	41	+2	35	Resigned to the Central Midlands League
9	Tadcaster Albion	26	9	7	10	44	39	+5	34	Promoted to Division Two
10	Stocksbridge Works	26	9	6	11	42	43	−1	33	Promoted to Division Two
11	Selby Town	26	8	7	11	47	59	−12	31	Promoted to Division Two
12	Fryston Colliery Welfare	26	5	6	15	32	72	−40	21	Promoted to Division Two
13	Wombwell Sporting Association	26	6	5	15	28	49	−21	20 (Note: Wombwell Sporting Association were deducted 3 points.)	Promoted to Division Two
14	Kimberley Town	26	4	6	16	26	64	−38	18	Resigned to the Central Midlands League

Source: fchd
Rules for classification: 1) points; 2) goal difference; 3) number of goals scored.
Notes:
Location of the clubs in the 1985–86 NCEL Division Three on a map of Yorkshire and the Humber
Location of the clubs in the 1985–86 NCEL Division Three on a map of the East Midlands
