= 1978–79 Yorkshire Football League =

The 1978–79 Yorkshire Football League was the 53rd season in the history of the Yorkshire Football League, a football competition in England.

== Division One ==
Yorkshire Football League Division One
- Season: 1978–79
- Champions: Winterton Rangers
- Relegated: Bentley Victoria Welfare; Kiveton Park; Lincoln United; Tadcaster Albion
- Matches played: 240
- Goals scored: 620 (2.58 per match)

Division One featured 12 clubs which competed in the previous season, along with four new clubs, promoted from Division Two:

- Bentley Victoria Welfare
- Kiveton Park
- Ossett Town
- Scarborough reserves

=== League table ===
| Pos | Team | Pld | W | D | L | GF | GA | GD | Pts | Qualification or relegation |
|---|---|---|---|---|---|---|---|---|---|---|
| 1 | Winterton Rangers | 30 | 19 | 5 | 6 | 54 | 21 | +33 | 43 | |
| 2 | Emley | 30 | 18 | 5 | 7 | 58 | 31 | +27 | 41 | |
| 3 | North Ferriby United | 30 | 16 | 9 | 5 | 55 | 31 | +24 | 41 | |
| 4 | Guiseley | 30 | 11 | 9 | 10 | 35 | 32 | +3 | 31 | |
| 5 | Thackley | 30 | 13 | 5 | 12 | 41 | 39 | +2 | 31 | |
| 6 | Ossett Town | 30 | 14 | 2 | 14 | 42 | 37 | +5 | 30 | |
| 7 | Scarborough reserves | 30 | 10 | 10 | 10 | 34 | 36 | −2 | 30 | |
| 8 | Sheffield | 30 | 9 | 11 | 10 | 26 | 28 | −2 | 29 | |
| 9 | Leeds Ashley Road | 30 | 10 | 8 | 12 | 34 | 37 | −3 | 28 | |
| 10 | Hallam | 30 | 12 | 4 | 14 | 33 | 42 | −9 | 28 | |
| 11 | Bridlington Town | 30 | 11 | 6 | 13 | 36 | 48 | −12 | 28 | |
| 12 | Frecheville Community Association | 30 | 7 | 13 | 10 | 33 | 42 | −9 | 27 | |
| 13 | Tadcaster Albion | 30 | 9 | 8 | 13 | 33 | 39 | −6 | 26 | Relegated to Division Two |
| 14 | Bentley Victoria Welfare | 30 | 9 | 7 | 14 | 34 | 38 | −4 | 25 | Relegated to Division Two |
| 15 | Kiveton Park | 30 | 8 | 7 | 15 | 44 | 54 | −10 | 23 | Relegated to Division Two |
| 16 | Lincoln United | 30 | 5 | 9 | 16 | 28 | 65 | −37 | 19 | Relegated to Division Two |

Source: fchd
Rules for classification: 1) points; 2) goal difference; 3) number of goals scored.
The points system until the 1990–91 season: 2 points for a win, 1 point for a draw and 0 points for losing.

=== Map ===
Location of the clubs in the 1978–79 Yorkshire League Division One on a map of Yorkshire and the Humber

== Division Two ==
Yorkshire Football League Division Two
- Season: 1978–79
- Champions: Ossett Albion
- Promoted: Fryston Colliery Welfare; Liversedge; Ossett Albion; Thorne Colliery
- Relegated: Rawmarsh Welfare; Wombwell Sporting Association; Worsbrough Bridge Miners Welfare Athletic
- Matches played: 240
- Goals scored: 681 (2.84 per match)

Division Two featured eight clubs which competed in the previous season, along with eight new clubs.

- Clubs relegated from Division One:
  - Denaby United
  - Farsley Celtic
  - Leeds & Carnegie Polytechnic
  - Ossett Albion
- Clubs promoted from Division Three:
  - Rawmarsh Welfare
  - Thorne Colliery
  - Wombwell Sporting Association
  - Yorkshire Amateur

=== League table ===
| Pos | Team | Pld | W | D | L | GF | GA | GD | Pts | Qualification or relegation |
|---|---|---|---|---|---|---|---|---|---|---|
| 1 | Ossett Albion | 30 | 17 | 9 | 4 | 37 | 18 | +19 | 43 | Promoted to Division One |
| 2 | Fryston Colliery Welfare | 30 | 15 | 6 | 9 | 56 | 36 | +20 | 36 | Promoted to Division One |
| 3 | Thorne Colliery | 30 | 12 | 12 | 6 | 45 | 34 | +11 | 36 | Promoted to Division One |
| 4 | Liversedge | 30 | 13 | 9 | 8 | 39 | 33 | +6 | 35 | Promoted to Division One |
| 5 | Brook Sports | 30 | 12 | 8 | 10 | 45 | 48 | −3 | 32 | |
| 6 | Farsley Celtic | 30 | 10 | 11 | 9 | 49 | 38 | +11 | 31 | |
| 7 | Hatfield Main | 30 | 11 | 9 | 10 | 39 | 36 | +3 | 31 | |
| 8 | Maltby Miners Welfare | 30 | 8 | 12 | 10 | 37 | 38 | −1 | 28 | |
| 9 | Denaby United | 30 | 10 | 7 | 13 | 47 | 51 | −4 | 27 | |
| 10 | Norton Woodseats | 30 | 10 | 7 | 13 | 38 | 47 | −9 | 27 | |
| 11 | Yorkshire Amateur | 30 | 9 | 9 | 12 | 34 | 46 | −12 | 27 | |
| 12 | Barton Town | 30 | 10 | 6 | 14 | 43 | 47 | −4 | 26 | |
| 13 | Rawmarsh Welfare | 30 | 8 | 10 | 12 | 45 | 51 | −6 | 26 | Relegated to Division Three |
| 14 | Worsbrough Bridge Miners Welfare Athletic | 30 | 11 | 4 | 15 | 39 | 48 | −9 | 26 | Relegated to Division Three |
| 15 | Leeds & Carnegie Polytechnic | 30 | 11 | 3 | 16 | 55 | 58 | −3 | 25 | Resigned from the league |
| 16 | Wombwell Sporting Association | 30 | 9 | 6 | 15 | 33 | 52 | −19 | 24 | Relegated to Division Three |

Source: fchd
Rules for classification: 1) points; 2) goal difference; 3) number of goals scored.
The points system until the 1990–91 season: 2 points for a win, 1 point for a draw and 0 points for losing.

=== Map ===
Location of the clubs in the 1978–79 Yorkshire League Division Two on a map of Yorkshire and the Humber

== Division Three ==
Yorkshire Football League Division Three
- Season: 1978–79
- Champions: York Railway Institute
- Promoted: Harworth Colliery Institute; BSC Parkgate; Stocksbridge Works; York Railway Institute
- Matches played: 210
- Goals scored: 683 (3.25 per match)

Division Three featured eleven clubs which competed in the previous season, along with four new clubs.

- Clubs relegated from Division Two:
  - Collingham
  - Harrogate Town
  - Pickering Town
- Plus:
  - Garforth Miners, joined from the West Yorkshire League

=== League table ===
| Pos | Team | Pld | W | D | L | GF | GA | GD | Pts | Qualification or relegation |
|---|---|---|---|---|---|---|---|---|---|---|
| 1 | York Railway Institute | 28 | 17 | 5 | 6 | 70 | 41 | +29 | 39 | Promoted to Division Two |
| 2 | Stocksbridge Works | 28 | 16 | 6 | 6 | 46 | 31 | +15 | 38 | Promoted to Division Two |
| 3 | Harworth Colliery Institute | 28 | 17 | 5 | 6 | 49 | 23 | +26 | 37 (Note: Harworth Colliery Institute were deducted 2 points.) | Promoted to Division Two |
| 4 | BSC Parkgate | 28 | 15 | 6 | 7 | 57 | 42 | +15 | 36 | Promoted to Division Two |
| 5 | Hall Road Rangers | 28 | 15 | 4 | 9 | 62 | 42 | +20 | 33 (Note: Hall Road Rangers were deducted 1 point.) | |
| 6 | Pickering Town | 28 | 13 | 7 | 8 | 67 | 47 | +20 | 33 | |
| 7 | Selby Town | 28 | 14 | 4 | 10 | 37 | 30 | +7 | 32 | |
| 8 | Dodworth Miners Welfare | 28 | 12 | 6 | 10 | 54 | 47 | +7 | 28 (Note: Dodworth Miners Welfare were deducted 2 points.) | Resigned from the league |
| 9 | Woolley Miners Welfare | 28 | 10 | 3 | 15 | 45 | 52 | −7 | 23 | |
| 10 | Pilkington Recreation | 28 | 9 | 5 | 14 | 36 | 45 | −9 | 23 | |
| 11 | Collingham | 28 | 8 | 7 | 13 | 42 | 51 | −9 | 23 | |
| 12 | Sheffield Waterworks | 28 | 8 | 7 | 13 | 32 | 45 | −13 | 23 | |
| 13 | Harrogate Town | 28 | 7 | 6 | 15 | 27 | 55 | −28 | 20 | |
| 14 | Garforth Miners | 28 | 5 | 7 | 16 | 30 | 62 | −32 | 17 | |
| 15 | Rossington Miners Welfare | 28 | 3 | 4 | 21 | 29 | 70 | −41 | 10 | |

Source: fchd
Rules for classification: 1) points; 2) goal difference; 3) number of goals scored.
The points system until the 1990–91 season: 2 points for a win, 1 point for a draw and 0 points for losing.

=== Map ===
Location of the clubs in the 1978–79 Yorkshire League Division Three on a map of Yorkshire and the Humber

== League Cup ==
1978–79 Yorkshire Football League League Cup
Tournament details
- Country: England

=== Final ===
| Emley | 1–0 | Winterton Rangers | Westfield Lane |
