= 1979–80 Yorkshire Football League =

The 1979–80 Yorkshire Football League was the 54th season in the history of the Yorkshire Football League, a football competition in England.

== Division One ==
Yorkshire Football League Division One
- Season: 1979–80
- Champions: Emley
- Relegated: Fryston Colliery Welfare; Ossett Albion; Ossett Town; Thorne Colliery
- Matches: 240
- Goals: 626 (2.61 per match)

Division One featured 12 clubs which competed in the previous season, along with four new clubs, promoted from Division Two:

- Fryston Colliery Welfare
- Liversedge
- Ossett Albion
- Thorne Colliery

=== League table ===
Pos	Team	Pld	W	D	L	GF	GA	GD	Pts	Qualification or relegation
1	Emley	30	22	6	2	62	21	+41	50	
2	Guiseley	30	20	7	3	62	23	+39	47	
3	Thackley	30	13	9	8	43	35	+8	35	
4	Scarborough reserves	30	14	6	10	43	37	+6	34	
5	Sheffield	30	11	11	8	34	24	+10	33	
6	Winterton Rangers	30	15	2	13	49	39	+10	32	
7	Hallam	30	13	5	12	42	46	−4	31	
8	North Ferriby United	30	9	12	9	32	30	+2	30	
9	Liversedge	30	10	9	11	34	33	+1	29	
10	Leeds Ashley Road	30	10	8	12	39	36	+3	28	
11	Frecheville Community Association	30	10	7	13	30	37	−7	27	
12	Bridlington Town	30	9	7	14	42	50	−8	25	
13	Thorne Colliery	30	8	7	15	35	52	−17	23	Relegated to Division Two
14	Ossett Town	30	7	8	15	31	47	−16	22	Relegated to Division Two
15	Fryston Colliery Welfare	30	7	6	17	22	49	−27	20	Relegated to Division Two
16	Ossett Albion	30	4	6	20	26	67	−41	14	Relegated to Division Two

Source: fchd
Rules for classification: 1) points; 2) goal difference; 3) number of goals scored.
The points system until the 1990–91 season: 2 points for a win, 1 point for a draw and 0 points for losing.

=== Map ===
Location of the clubs in the 1979–80 Yorkshire League Division One on a map of Yorkshire and the Humber

== Division Two ==
Yorkshire Football League Division Two
- Season: 1979–80
- Champions: Barton Town
- Promoted: Barton Town; Bentley Victoria Welfare; Kiveton Park; Maltby MW
- Relegated: Brook Sports; Denaby United; Stocksbridge Works; Tadcaster Albion
- Matches: 240
- Goals: 698 (2.91 per match)

Division Two featured eight clubs which competed in the previous season, along with eight new clubs.

- Clubs relegated from Division One:
  - Bentley Victoria Welfare
  - Kiveton Park
  - Lincoln United
  - Tadcaster Albion
- Clubs promoted from Division Three:
  - Harworth Colliery Institute
  - BSC Parkgate
  - Stocksbridge Works
  - York Railway Institute

=== League table ===
Pos	Team	Pld	W	D	L	GF	GA	GD	Pts	Qualification or relegation
1	Barton Town	30	22	4	4	62	20	+42	48	Promoted to Division One
2	Bentley Victoria Welfare	30	19	6	5	70	38	+32	44	Promoted to Division One
3	Kiveton Park	30	17	8	5	61	38	+23	42	Promoted to Division One
4	Maltby Miners Welfare	30	15	9	6	50	30	+20	39	Promoted to Division One
5	Hatfield Main	30	14	8	8	54	29	+25	36	
6	BSC Parkgate	30	15	4	11	44	37	+7	34	
7	York Railway Institute	30	12	9	9	47	49	−2	33	
8	Farsley Celtic	30	13	6	11	49	43	+6	32	
9	Norton Woodseats	30	11	10	9	43	39	+4	32	
10	Lincoln United	30	10	7	13	46	64	−18	27	
11	Harworth Colliery Institute	30	8	10	12	32	40	−8	26	
12	Yorkshire Amateur	30	6	9	15	31	48	−17	21	
13	Brook Sports	30	6	9	15	32	55	−23	21	Relegated to Division Three
14	Denaby United	30	6	5	19	29	51	−22	17	Relegated to Division Three
15	Tadcaster Albion	30	4	9	17	23	49	−26	17	Relegated to Division Three
16	Stocksbridge Works	30	1	9	20	25	68	−43	11	Relegated to Division Three

Source: fchd
Rules for classification: 1) points; 2) goal difference; 3) number of goals scored.
The points system until the 1990–91 season: 2 points for a win, 1 point for a draw and 0 points for losing.

=== Map ===
Location of the clubs in the 1979–80 Yorkshire League Division Two on a map of Yorkshire and the Humber

== Division Three ==
Yorkshire Football League Division Three
- Season: 1979–80
- Champions: Hall Road Rangers
- Promoted: Garforth Miners; Hall Road Rangers; Pilkington Recreation; Rawmarsh Welfare
- Matches: 182
- Goals: 528 (2.9 per match)

Division Three featured nine clubs which competed in the previous season, along with seven new clubs.

- Clubs relegated from Division Two:
  - Rawmarsh Welfare
  - Wombwell Sporting Association
  - Worsbrough Bridge Miners Welfare Athletic
- Plus:
  - Pontefract Collieries

=== League table ===
Pos	Team	Pld	W	D	L	GF	GA	GD	Pts	Qualification or relegation
1	Hall Road Rangers	26	15	6	5	62	29	+33	36	Promoted to Division Two
2	Garforth Miners	26	14	6	6	40	25	+15	34	Promoted to Division Two
3	Rawmarsh Welfare	26	14	6	6	43	33	+10	34	Promoted to Division Two
4	Pilkington Recreation	26	13	7	6	41	28	+13	33	Promoted to Division Two
5	Pontefract Collieries	26	11	8	7	39	29	+10	30	
6	Harrogate Town	26	11	6	9	44	36	+8	28	
7	Worsbrough Bridge Miners Welfare Athletic	26	9	7	10	31	31	0	25	
8	Woolley Miners Welfare	26	7	11	8	35	36	−1	25	
9	Selby Town	26	8	9	9	32	41	−9	25	
10	Pickering Town	26	11	2	13	44	34	+10	24	
11	Collingham	26	9	6	11	26	36	−10	24	
12	Sheffield Waterworks	26	9	5	12	41	44	−3	23	
13	Rossington Miners Welfare	26	4	4	18	25	70	−45	12	Resigned to the Doncaster & District Senior League
14	Wombwell Sporting Association	26	3	5	18	25	56	−31	11	

Source: fchd
Rules for classification: 1) points; 2) goal difference; 3) number of goals scored.
The points system until the 1990–91 season: 2 points for a win, 1 point for a draw and 0 points for losing.

=== Map ===
Location of the clubs in the 1979–80 Yorkshire League Division Three on a map of Yorkshire and the Humber

== League Cup ==
1979–80 Yorkshire Football League League Cup
Tournament details
- Country: England

Final positions
- Champions: Guiseley
- Runners-up: Emley

=== Final ===
Guiseley	1–0	Emley
