= 1984–85 Northern Counties East Football League =

The 1984–85 Northern Counties East Football League season was the third in the history of Northern Counties East Football League, a football competition in England.

At the end of the season divisions One North, One Central and One South was reorganised. The clubs were distributed between newly formed divisions One, Two and Three.

== Premier Division ==
Northern Counties East Football League Premier Division
- Season: 1984–85
- Champions: Belper Town
- Relegated: Mexborough Town Athletic
- Matches: 342
- Goals: 1,130 (3.3 per match)

The Premier Division featured 17 clubs which competed in the previous season, along with two new clubs:

- Denaby United, promoted from Division One South
- Pontefract Collieries, promoted from Division One North

=== League table ===
Pos	Team	Pld	W	D	L	GF	GA	GD	Pts	Promotion or relegation
1	Belper Town	36	25	6	5	74	30	+44	81	
2	Eastwood Town	36	23	3	10	98	59	+39	72	
3	Guiseley	36	21	7	8	78	47	+31	70	
4	Alfreton Town	36	20	6	10	69	39	+30	66	
5	Guisborough Town	36	18	8	10	71	49	+22	62	Transferred to the Northern Football League
6	Denaby United	36	18	8	10	71	51	+20	62	
7	Arnold	36	17	9	10	72	49	+23	60	
8	Emley	36	16	7	13	67	52	+15	55	
9	Bridlington Trinity	36	16	5	15	71	67	+4	53	
10	Thackley	36	15	6	15	55	61	−6	51	
11	Spalding United	36	14	8	14	55	48	+7	50	
12	Sutton Town	36	14	5	17	45	69	−24	47	
13	Ilkeston Town	36	14	4	18	49	54	−5	46	
14	Pontefract Collieries	36	11	10	15	45	54	−9	43	
15	Bentley Victoria Welfare	36	11	6	19	47	67	−20	39	
16	Appleby Frodingham	36	8	9	19	46	73	−27	33	
17	Boston	36	8	6	22	35	88	−53	30	
18	Heanor Town	36	8	5	23	50	89	−39	29	
19	Mexborough Town Athletic	36	2	8	26	32	84	−52	14	Relegated to Division One

Source: fchd
Rules for classification: 1) points; 2) goal difference; 3) number of goals scored.

=== Map ===
Location of the clubs in the 1984–85 NCEL Premier Division on a map of Yorkshire and the Humber
Location of the clubs in the 1984–85 NCEL Premier Division on a map of the East Midlands (ET = Eastwood Town, HT = Heanor Town)

== Division One North ==
Northern Counties East Football League Division One North
- Season: 1984–85
- Champions: Farsley Celtic
- Promoted: Farsley Celtic
- Matches: 272
- Goals: 866 (3.18 per match)

Division One North featured nine clubs which competed in the previous season, along with eight new clubs, promoted from Division Two North:

- Collingham
- Hall Road Rangers
- Harrogate Railway Athletic
- Phoenix Park
- Pickering Town
- Selby Town
- Tadcaster Albion
- Yorkshire Amateur

=== League table ===
Pos	Team	Pld	W	D	L	GF	GA	GD	Pts	Promotion or relegation
1	Farsley Celtic	32	18	10	4	66	28	+38	64	Promoted to the Premier Division
2	Harrogate Town	32	17	9	6	61	35	+26	60	Qualified to Division One
3	Bradley Rangers	32	16	11	5	61	35	+26	59	Qualified to Division One
4	Harrogate Railway Athletic	32	17	7	8	65	41	+24	58	Qualified to Division One
5	Bridlington Town	32	16	6	10	57	46	+11	54	Qualified to Division One
6	Rowntree Mackintosh	32	15	8	9	62	37	+25	53	Qualified to Division One
7	North Ferriby United	32	16	5	11	54	42	+12	53	Qualified to Division One
8	Liversedge	32	14	6	12	55	50	+5	48	Relegated to Division Two
9	Garforth Miners	32	11	9	12	53	57	−4	42	Relegated to Division Two
10	York Railway Institute	32	11	9	12	51	55	−4	42	Relegated to Division Two
11	Pickering Town	32	11	8	13	37	43	−6	41	Relegated to Division Two
12	Phoenix Park	32	10	8	14	57	59	−2	38	Resigned from the league
13	Selby Town	32	10	7	15	43	59	−16	37	Demoted to Division Three
14	Hall Road Rangers	32	9	6	17	45	70	−25	33	Demoted to Division Three
15	Yorkshire Amateur	32	7	7	18	34	60	−26	28	Demoted to Division Three
16	Collingham	32	5	12	15	42	71	−29	27	Demoted to Division Three
17	Tadcaster Albion	32	3	4	25	23	78	−55	13	Demoted to Division Three

Source: fchd
Rules for classification: 1) points; 2) goal difference; 3) number of goals scored.

=== Map ===
Location of the clubs in the 1984–85 NCEL Division One North on a map of Yorkshire and the Humber

== Division One Central ==
Northern Counties East Football League Division One Central
- Season: 1984–85
- Champions: Armthorpe Welfare
- Promoted: Armthorpe Welfare
- Matches: 240
- Goals: 801 (3.34 per match)

Division One Central featured six clubs which competed in the previous season in Division One North or South, along with ten new clubs.

- Clubs transferred from Division One North:
  - Hatfield Main
  - Ossett Albion
  - Ossett Town
- Clubs transferred from Division One South:
  - Maltby Miners Welfare
  - BSC Parkgate
  - Woolley Miners Welfare
- Clubs promoted from Division Two North:
  - Armthorpe Welfare
  - Fryston Colliery Welfare
  - Grimethorpe Miners Welfare
  - Pilkington Recreation
  - Thorne Colliery
- Clubs promoted from Division Two South:
  - Brigg Town
  - Stocksbridge Works
  - Wombwell Sporting Association
  - Worsbrough Bridge Miners Welfare
  - Yorkshire Main

=== League table ===
Pos	Team	Pld	W	D	L	GF	GA	GD	Pts	Promotion or relegation
1	Armthorpe Welfare	30	21	5	4	68	26	+42	68	Promoted to the Premier Division
2	Brigg Town	30	19	7	4	68	36	+32	64	Qualified to Division One
3	Woolley Miners Welfare	30	19	6	5	67	38	+29	63	Qualified to Division One
4	Ossett Albion	30	16	7	7	55	28	+27	55	Qualified to Division One
5	Hatfield Main	30	16	7	7	56	35	+21	55	Qualified to Division One
6	Pilkington Recreation	30	14	4	12	41	42	−1	46	Qualified to Division One
7	Thorne Colliery	30	13	6	11	54	45	+9	45	Relegated to Division Two
8	Ossett Town	30	12	6	12	51	37	+14	42	Relegated to Division Two
9	BSC Parkgate	30	12	6	12	52	41	+11	42	Relegated to Division Two
10	Grimethorpe Miners Welfare	30	12	6	12	59	53	+6	42	Relegated to Division Two
11	Maltby Miners Welfare	30	13	3	14	49	46	+3	42	Relegated to Division Two
12	Yorkshire Main	30	11	8	11	53	56	−3	41	Relegated to Division Two
13	Worsbrough Bridge Miners Welfare	30	8	7	15	48	67	−19	31	Demoted to Division Three
14	Stocksbridge Works	30	6	2	22	31	76	−45	20	Demoted to Division Three
15	Wombwell Sporting Association	30	3	5	22	23	70	−47	14	Demoted to Division Three
16	Fryston Colliery Welfare	30	2	1	27	26	105	−79	7	Demoted to Division Three

Source: fchd
Rules for classification: 1) points; 2) goal difference; 3) number of goals scored.

=== Map ===
Location of the clubs in the 1984–85 NCEL Division One North on a map of Yorkshire and the Humber

== Division One South ==
Northern Counties East Football League Division One South
- Season: 1984–85
- Champions: Long Eaton United
- Promoted: Long Eaton United
- Matches: 240
- Goals: 697 (2.9 per match)

Division One South featured ten clubs which competed in the previous season, along with six new clubs, promoted from Division Two South:

- Blidworth Welfare
- Graham Street Prims
- Kimberley Town
- Kiveton Park
- Oakham United
- Retford Town

In addition, Norton Woodseats changed their name to Dronfield United.

=== League table ===
Pos	Team	Pld	W	D	L	GF	GA	GD	Pts	Promotion or relegation
1	Long Eaton United	30	21	5	4	58	23	+35	68	Promoted to the Premier Division
2	Borrowash Victoria	30	20	5	5	64	32	+32	65	Qualified to Division One
3	Dronfield United	30	18	4	8	55	35	+20	58	Qualified to Division One
4	Retford Town	30	17	5	8	60	36	+24	56	Club folded
5	Harworth Colliery Institute	30	14	7	9	42	33	+9	49	Qualified to Division One
6	Sheffield	30	13	8	9	58	39	+19	47	Qualified to Division One
7	Staveley Works	30	13	5	12	42	39	+3	44	Relegated to Division Two
8	Arnold Kingswell	30	12	6	12	48	42	+6	42	Relegated to Division Two
9	Hallam	30	10	9	11	46	41	+5	39	Relegated to Division Two
10	Frecheville Community Association	30	10	9	11	47	45	+2	39	Relegated to Division Two
11	Lincoln United	30	10	8	12	37	35	+2	38	Relegated to Division Two
12	Kiveton Park	30	10	5	15	29	49	−20	35	Relegated to Division Two
13	Oakham United	30	8	8	14	30	44	−14	32	Demoted to Division Three
14	Graham Street Prims	30	9	4	17	28	45	−17	31	Demoted to Division Three
15	Blidworth Miners Welfare	30	7	1	22	32	87	−55	22	Demoted to Division Three
16	Kimberley Town	30	2	3	25	21	72	−51	9	Demoted to Division Three

Source: fchd
Rules for classification: 1) points; 2) goal difference; 3) number of goals scored.

=== Map ===
Location of the clubs in the 1984–85 NCEL Division One South on a map of the East Midlands
