= 1986–87 Northern Counties East Football League =

The 1986–87 Northern Counties East Football League season was the 5th in the history of Northern Counties East Football League, a football competition in England. The league consisted of three divisions after Division Three was disbanded at the end of the previous season. Most of Division Three clubs were promoted to Division Two.

== Premier Division ==
Northern Counties East Football League Premier Division
- Season: 1986–87
- Champions: Alfreton Town
- Promoted: Alfreton Town; Eastwood Town; Farsley Celtic; Harrogate Town; Sutton Town
- Matches: 342
- Goals: 988 (2.89 per match)

The Premier Division featured 15 clubs which competed in the previous season, along with four new clubs, promoted from Division One:

- Bridlington Town
- Brigg Town
- Harrogate Town
- North Ferriby United

=== League table ===
| Pos | Team | Pld | W | D | L | GF | GA | GD | Pts | Promotion or relegation |
|---|---|---|---|---|---|---|---|---|---|---|
| 1 | Alfreton Town | 36 | 25 | 6 | 5 | 74 | 29 | +45 | 81 | Promoted to the Northern Premier League Division One |
| 2 | Farsley Celtic | 36 | 24 | 6 | 6 | 74 | 41 | +33 | 78 | Promoted to the Northern Premier League Division One |
| 3 | North Ferriby United | 36 | 20 | 10 | 6 | 57 | 26 | +31 | 70 | |
| 4 | Emley | 36 | 17 | 10 | 9 | 60 | 41 | +19 | 61 | |
| 5 | Sutton Town | 36 | 17 | 10 | 9 | 54 | 45 | +9 | 61 | Promoted to the Northern Premier League Division One |
| 6 | Denaby United | 36 | 15 | 10 | 11 | 59 | 43 | +16 | 55 | |
| 7 | Thackley | 36 | 14 | 13 | 9 | 47 | 45 | +2 | 55 | |
| 8 | Pontefract Collieries | 36 | 16 | 6 | 14 | 54 | 44 | +10 | 54 | |
| 9 | Harrogate Town | 36 | 14 | 10 | 12 | 48 | 48 | 0 | 52 | Promoted to the Northern Premier League Division One |
| 10 | Bridlington Town | 36 | 12 | 14 | 10 | 57 | 49 | +8 | 50 | |
| 11 | Long Eaton United | 36 | 12 | 11 | 13 | 41 | 43 | −2 | 47 | |
| 12 | Armthorpe Welfare | 36 | 13 | 6 | 17 | 55 | 60 | −5 | 45 | |
| 13 | Eastwood Town | 36 | 11 | 9 | 16 | 45 | 57 | −12 | 42 | Promoted to the Northern Premier League Division One |
| 14 | Bentley Victoria Welfare | 36 | 10 | 9 | 17 | 64 | 77 | −13 | 39 | Club folded |
| 15 | Belper Town | 36 | 8 | 12 | 16 | 49 | 47 | +2 | 36 | |
| 16 | Guiseley | 36 | 9 | 8 | 19 | 46 | 76 | −30 | 35 | |
| 17 | Bridlington Trinity | 36 | 6 | 11 | 19 | 46 | 76 | −30 | 29 | |
| 18 | Brigg Town | 36 | 6 | 9 | 21 | 35 | 73 | −38 | 27 | |
| 19 | Boston | 36 | 6 | 4 | 26 | 23 | 68 | −45 | 22 | Resigned to the Central Midlands League |

Source: fchd
Rules for classification: 1) points; 2) goal difference; 3) number of goals scored.

=== Map ===
Location of the clubs in the 1986–87 NCEL Premier Division on a map of Yorkshire and the Humber
Location of the clubs in the 1986–87 NCEL Premier Division on a map of the East Midlands

== Division One ==
Northern Counties East Football League Division One
- Season: 1986–87
- Champions: Ossett Albion
- Promoted: Grimethorpe Miners Welfare; Hallam; Harrogate Railway Athletic; Hatfield Main; Ossett Albion
- Matches: 306
- Goals: 982 (3.21 per match)

Division One featured ten clubs which competed in the previous season, along with eight new clubs, promoted from Division Two:

- Garforth Town
- Grimethorpe Miners Welfare
- Hallam
- Kiveton Park
- Maltby Miners Welfare
- BSC Parkgate
- Staveley Works
- York Railway Institute

=== League table ===
| Pos | Team | Pld | W | D | L | GF | GA | GD | Pts | Promotion or relegation |
|---|---|---|---|---|---|---|---|---|---|---|
| 1 | Ossett Albion | 34 | 22 | 4 | 8 | 65 | 43 | +22 | 70 | Promoted to the Premier Division |
| 2 | Rowntree Mackintosh | 34 | 20 | 4 | 10 | 101 | 54 | +47 | 64 | |
| 3 | Hatfield Main | 34 | 19 | 7 | 8 | 69 | 47 | +22 | 64 | Promoted to the Premier Division |
| 4 | Harrogate Railway Athletic | 34 | 19 | 7 | 8 | 65 | 44 | +21 | 64 | Promoted to the Premier Division |
| 5 | Bradley Rangers | 34 | 17 | 8 | 9 | 64 | 51 | +13 | 59 | |
| 6 | Hallam | 34 | 16 | 8 | 10 | 49 | 37 | +12 | 56 | Promoted to the Premier Division |
| 7 | Staveley Works | 34 | 14 | 9 | 11 | 51 | 46 | +5 | 51 | |
| 8 | York Railway Institute | 34 | 15 | 5 | 14 | 49 | 56 | −7 | 50 | |
| 9 | Maltby Miners Welfare | 34 | 13 | 7 | 14 | 53 | 57 | −4 | 46 | |
| 10 | Pilkington Recreation | 34 | 13 | 6 | 15 | 51 | 49 | +2 | 45 | |
| 11 | Garforth Town | 34 | 11 | 10 | 13 | 44 | 48 | −4 | 43 | |
| 12 | Grimethorpe Miners Welfare | 34 | 13 | 4 | 17 | 60 | 65 | −5 | 43 | Promoted to the Premier Division |
| 13 | Woolley Miners Welfare | 34 | 11 | 9 | 14 | 57 | 61 | −4 | 42 | |
| 14 | Kiveton Park | 34 | 11 | 6 | 17 | 41 | 64 | −23 | 39 | |
| 15 | BSC Parkgate | 34 | 10 | 8 | 16 | 51 | 57 | −6 | 38 | |
| 16 | Mexborough Town Athletic | 34 | 8 | 10 | 16 | 38 | 64 | −26 | 34 | |
| 17 | Sheffield | 34 | 9 | 6 | 19 | 41 | 55 | −14 | 33 | |
| 18 | Dronfield United | 34 | 4 | 4 | 26 | 33 | 84 | −51 | 16 | |

Source: fchd
Rules for classification: 1) points; 2) goal difference; 3) number of goals scored.

=== Map ===
Location of the clubs in the 1986–87 NCEL Division One on a map of Yorkshire and the Humber

== Division Two ==
Northern Counties East Football League Division Two
- Season: 1986–87
- Champions: Frecheville Community
- Promoted: Eccleshill United; Frecheville Community; Immingham Town
- Matches: 306
- Goals: 868 (2.84 per match)

Division One featured five clubs which competed in the previous season, along with 13 new clubs.

- Clubs promoted from Division Three:
  - Collingham
  - Eccleshill United
  - Fryston Colliery Welfare
  - Glasshoughton Welfare
  - Hall Road Rangers
  - Selby Town
  - Stocksbridge Works, who also merged with Oxley Park F.C. to form Stocksbridge Park Steels F.C.
  - Tadcaster Albion
  - Wombwell Sporting Association
  - Worsbrough Bridge Miners Welfare
  - Yorkshire Amateur
- Plus:
  - Immingham Town, joined from the Lincolnshire Football League
  - Winterton Rangers

=== League table ===
| Pos | Team | Pld | W | D | L | GF | GA | GD | Pts | Promotion or relegation |
|---|---|---|---|---|---|---|---|---|---|---|
| 1 | Frecheville Community Association | 34 | 24 | 7 | 3 | 57 | 27 | +30 | 79 | Promoted to Division One |
| 2 | Eccleshill United | 34 | 22 | 6 | 6 | 75 | 36 | +39 | 72 | Promoted to Division One |
| 3 | Immingham Town | 34 | 18 | 4 | 12 | 53 | 43 | +10 | 58 | Promoted to Division One |
| 4 | Hall Road Rangers | 34 | 16 | 9 | 9 | 72 | 48 | +24 | 57 | |
| 5 | Collingham | 34 | 14 | 13 | 7 | 67 | 34 | +33 | 55 | |
| 6 | Worsbrough Bridge Miners Welfare | 34 | 15 | 7 | 12 | 61 | 48 | +13 | 52 | |
| 7 | Stocksbridge Park Steels | 34 | 12 | 15 | 7 | 50 | 38 | +12 | 51 | |
| 8 | Selby Town | 34 | 14 | 8 | 12 | 47 | 42 | +5 | 50 | |
| 9 | Yorkshire Amateur | 34 | 12 | 10 | 12 | 47 | 36 | +11 | 46 | |
| 10 | Ossett Town | 34 | 12 | 10 | 12 | 42 | 52 | −10 | 46 | |
| 11 | Liversedge | 34 | 10 | 13 | 11 | 40 | 45 | −5 | 43 | |
| 12 | Glasshoughton Welfare | 34 | 11 | 9 | 14 | 50 | 52 | −2 | 42 | |
| 13 | Tadcaster Albion | 34 | 11 | 7 | 16 | 38 | 46 | −8 | 40 | |
| 14 | Pickering Town | 34 | 8 | 15 | 11 | 39 | 57 | −18 | 39 | |
| 15 | Yorkshire Main | 34 | 8 | 13 | 13 | 43 | 60 | −17 | 37 | |
| 16 | Winterton Rangers | 34 | 7 | 7 | 20 | 30 | 53 | −23 | 28 | |
| 17 | Wombwell Sporting Association | 34 | 7 | 7 | 20 | 39 | 75 | −36 | 28 | |
| 18 | Fryston Colliery Welfare | 34 | 2 | 6 | 26 | 18 | 76 | −58 | 12 | |

Source: fchd
Rules for classification: 1) points; 2) goal difference; 3) number of goals scored.

=== Map ===
Location of the clubs in the 1986–87 NCEL Division Two on a map of Yorkshire and the Humber
