= 1989–90 Northern Counties East Football League =

The 1989–90 Northern Counties East Football League season was the 8th in the history of Northern Counties East Football League, a football competition in England.

== Premier Division ==
Northern Counties East Football League Premier Division
- Season: 1989–90
- Champions: Bridlington Town
- Promoted: Bridlington Town
- Relegated: Sheffield; Hallam; Grimethorpe Miners Welfare; Hatfield Main
- Matches: 306
- Goals: 921 (3.01 per match)

The Premier Division featured 15 clubs which competed in the previous season, along with three new clubs:

- North Shields, transferred from the Northern League
- Sheffield, promoted from Division One
- Sutton Town, relegated from the Northern Premier League

=== Map ===
Location of the clubs in the 1989–90 NCEL Premier Division on a map of Yorkshire and the Humber
Location of the clubs in the 1989–90 NCEL Premier Division on a map of the East Midlands
Location of the clubs in the 1989–90 NCEL Premier Division on a map of North East England

=== League table ===
Pos	Team	Pld	W	D	L	GF	GA	GD	Pts	Promotion or relegation
1	Bridlington Town	34	22	9	3	72	24	+48	75	Promoted to the Northern Premier League Division One
2	North Shields	34	21	6	7	63	31	+32	69	
3	Denaby United	34	19	5	10	55	40	+15	62	
4	Bridlington Trinity	34	18	6	10	82	44	+38	60	Club folded
5	Harrogate Railway Athletic	34	17	9	8	59	50	+9	60	
6	North Ferriby United	34	18	5	11	66	43	+23	59	
7	Armthorpe Welfare	34	18	4	12	53	39	+14	58	
8	Sutton Town	34	16	9	9	52	38	+14	57	
9	Sheffield	34	15	10	9	44	33	+11	55	Relegated to Division One
10	Brigg Town	34	13	7	14	57	50	+7	46	
11	Guiseley	34	12	7	15	54	46	+8	43	
12	Belper Town	34	11	6	17	39	50	−11	39	
13	Pontefract Collieries	34	10	7	17	43	67	−24	37	
14	Hallam	34	9	8	17	45	64	−19	35	Relegated to Division One
15	Thackley	34	7	9	18	43	64	−21	30	
16	Ossett Albion	34	6	7	21	27	69	−42	25	
17	Grimethorpe Miners Welfare	34	7	3	24	40	90	−50	24	Relegated to Division One
18	Hatfield Main	34	6	5	23	27	79	−52	23	Relegated to Division One

Source: fchd
Rules for classification: 1) points; 2) goal difference; 3) number of goals scored.

== Division One ==
Northern Counties East Football League Division One
- Season: 1989–90
- Champions: Rowntree Mackintosh
- Promoted: Maltby Main; Ossett Town
- Relegated: Immingham Town; Kiveton Park; Rowntree Mackintosh
- Matches: 210
- Goals: 619 (2.95 per match)

Division One featured 13 clubs which competed in the previous season, along with two new clubs, promoted from Division Two:

- Liversedge
- Ossett Town

=== Map ===
Location of the clubs in the 1989–90 NCEL Division One on a map of Yorkshire and the Humber

=== League table ===
Pos	Team	Pld	W	D	L	GF	GA	GD	Pts	Promotion or relegation
1	Rowntree Mackintosh	28	18	7	3	63	23	+40	61	Relegated to Division Two
2	Liversedge	28	17	3	8	57	29	+28	54	
3	Ossett Town	28	15	9	4	49	22	+27	54	Promoted to the Premier Division
4	Woolley Miners Welfare	28	15	5	8	51	33	+18	50	Resigned from the league
5	Maltby Miners Welfare	28	12	11	5	51	29	+22	47	Promoted to the Premier Division
6	Garforth Town	28	13	7	8	42	23	+19	46	
7	Eccleshill United	28	11	9	8	50	45	+5	42	
8	Kiveton Park	28	13	2	13	35	31	+4	41	Relegated to Division Two
9	Immingham Town	28	10	7	11	28	37	−9	37	Relegated to Division Two
10	Collingham	28	10	3	15	29	41	−12	33	Resigned from the league
11	Frecheville Community Association	28	8	7	13	41	45	−4	31	Resigned to the Sheffield & Hallamshire County Senior Football League
12	BSC Parkgate	28	7	10	11	33	42	−9	31	
13	York Railway Institute	28	9	3	16	34	66	−32	30	
14	Pickering Town	28	6	5	17	39	64	−25	23	
15	Mexborough Town	28	1	2	25	17	89	−72	5	

Source: fchd
Rules for classification: 1) points; 2) goal difference; 3) number of goals scored.

== Division Two ==
Northern Counties East Football League Division Two
- Season: 1989–90
- Champions: Winterton Rangers
- Promoted: Winterton Rangers; Selby Town; Yorkshire Main; Glasshoughton Welfare
- Matches: 182
- Goals: 519 (2.85 per match)

Division One featured 12 clubs which competed in the previous season, along with two new clubs, relegated from Division One:

- Bradley Rangers
- Pilkington Recreation

=== Map ===
Location of the clubs in the 1988–89 NCEL Division Two on a map of Yorkshire and the Humber

=== League table ===
Pos	Team	Pld	W	D	L	GF	GA	GD	Pts	Promotion or relegation
1	Winterton Rangers	26	15	6	5	46	28	+18	51	Promoted to the Premier Division
2	Selby Town	26	13	8	5	51	29	+22	47	Promoted to Division One
3	Bradley Rangers	26	12	9	5	48	34	+14	45	
4	Fryston Colliery Welfare	26	12	8	6	39	29	+10	44	
5	Yorkshire Main	26	13	3	10	41	46	−5	42	Promoted to Division One
6	Glasshoughton Welfare	26	10	7	9	40	35	+5	37	Promoted to Division One
7	Stocksbridge Park Steels	26	9	9	8	36	28	+8	36	
8	Yorkshire Amateur	26	8	9	9	41	34	+7	33	
9	Brodsworth Miners Welfare	26	7	11	8	35	41	−6	32	
10	Tadcaster Albion	26	8	6	12	31	38	−7	30	
11	Worsbrough Bridge Miners Welfare	26	7	8	11	36	40	−4	29	
12	Hall Road Rangers	26	5	9	12	25	47	−22	24	
13	Dronfield United	26	5	8	13	30	47	−17	23	
14	Pilkington Recreation	26	4	7	15	20	43	−23	19	

Source: fchd
Rules for classification: 1) points; 2) goal difference; 3) number of goals scored.
