= 1987–88 Northern Counties East Football League =

The 1987–88 Northern Counties East Football League season was the 6th in the history of Northern Counties East Football League, a football competition in England.

== Premier Division ==
Northern Counties East Football League Premier Division
- Season: 1987–88
- Champions: Emley
- Matches: 272
- Goals: 795 (2.92 per match)

The Premier Division featured 12 clubs which competed in the previous season, along with five new clubs, promoted from Division One:

- Grimethorpe Miners Welfare
- Hallam
- Harrogate Railway Athletic
- Hatfield Main
- Ossett Albion

=== League table ===
Pos	Team	Pld	W	D	L	GF	GA	GD	Pts
1	Emley	32	20	8	4	57	21	+36	68
2	Armthorpe Welfare	32	21	5	6	56	36	+20	68
3	Denaby United	32	19	4	9	61	46	+15	61
4	Bridlington Town	32	18	5	9	63	25	+38	59
5	Thackley	32	16	8	8	50	37	+13	56
6	North Ferriby United	32	12	11	9	49	41	+8	47
7	Guiseley	32	14	5	13	52	51	+1	47
8	Pontefract Collieries	32	11	10	11	42	42	0	43
9	Grimethorpe Miners Welfare	32	11	9	12	46	49	−3	42
10	Hallam	32	11	6	15	48	53	−5	39
11	Hatfield Main	32	11	6	15	52	59	−7	39
12	Harrogate Railway Athletic	32	9	9	14	40	56	−16	36
13	Bridlington Trinity	32	8	9	15	52	68	−16	33
14	Long Eaton United	32	9	6	17	24	44	−20	33
15	Brigg Town	32	8	8	16	40	57	−17	32
16	Belper Town	32	5	12	15	32	52	−20	27
17	Ossett Albion	32	4	9	19	31	58	−27	21

Source: fchd
Rules for classification: 1) points; 2) goal difference; 3) number of goals scored.

=== Map ===
Location of the clubs in the 1987–88 NCEL Premier Division on a map of Yorkshire and the Humber
Location of the clubs in the 1987–88 NCEL Premier Division on a map of the East Midlands

== Division One ==
Northern Counties East Football League Division One
- Season: 1987–88
- Champions: York Railway Institute
- Relegated: Dronfield United
- Matches: 240
- Goals: 758 (3.16 per match)

Division One featured 13 clubs which competed in the previous season, along with three new clubs, promoted from Division Two:

- Eccleshill United
- Frecheville Community
- Immingham Town

Also, Mexborough Town Athletic changed their name to Mexborough Town.

=== League table ===
Pos	Team	Pld	W	D	L	GF	GA	GD	Pts	Promotion or relegation
1	York Railway Institute	30	22	2	6	66	29	+37	68	
2	Rowntree Mackintosh	30	20	5	5	74	35	+39	65	
3	Maltby Miners Welfare	30	18	6	6	61	32	+29	60	
4	BSC Parkgate	30	18	4	8	52	34	+18	58	
5	Bradley Rangers	30	15	9	6	64	45	+19	54	
6	Woolley Miners Welfare	30	14	8	8	69	39	+30	50	
7	Eccleshill United	30	13	8	9	49	50	−1	47	
8	Sheffield	30	13	4	13	38	34	+4	43	
9	Immingham Town	30	9	10	11	41	40	+1	37	
10	Frecheville Community Association	30	8	10	12	40	51	−11	34	
11	Kiveton Park	30	10	4	16	29	51	−22	34	
12	Staveley Works	30	9	5	16	42	65	−23	32	Resigned to the Central Midlands League
13	Pilkington Recreation	30	6	7	17	30	65	−35	25	
14	Garforth Town	30	6	6	18	29	51	−22	24	
15	Mexborough Town	30	6	5	19	38	62	−24	23	
16	Dronfield United	30	3	7	20	36	75	−39	16	Relegated to Division Two

Source: fchd
Rules for classification: 1) points; 2) goal difference; 3) number of goals scored.

=== Map ===
Location of the clubs in the 1987–88 NCEL Division One on a map of Yorkshire and the Humber

== Division Two ==
Northern Counties East Football League Division Two
- Season: 1987–88
- Champions: Pickering Town
- Promoted: Collingham; Pickering Town
- Matches: 210
- Goals: 655 (3.12 per match)

Division Two featured 15 clubs which competed in the previous season, no new clubs joined the division this season.

=== League table ===
Pos	Team	Pld	W	D	L	GF	GA	GD	Pts	Promotion or relegation
1	Pickering Town	28	18	6	4	66	33	+33	60	Promoted to Division One
2	Collingham	28	16	9	3	63	26	+37	57	Promoted to Division One
3	Yorkshire Amateur	28	16	9	3	44	23	+21	57	
4	Ossett Town	28	16	7	5	78	37	+41	55	
5	Worsbrough Bridge Miners Welfare	28	14	4	10	54	43	+11	46	
6	Liversedge	28	13	5	10	51	40	+11	44	
7	Yorkshire Main	28	11	8	9	53	58	−5	41	
8	Stocksbridge Park Steels	28	11	7	10	50	37	+13	40	
9	Winterton Rangers	28	10	7	11	47	47	0	37	
10	Selby Town	28	9	4	15	39	48	−9	31	
11	Hall Road Rangers	28	9	4	15	35	63	−28	31	
12	Glasshoughton Welfare	28	6	12	10	29	35	−6	30	
13	Fryston Colliery Welfare	28	6	4	18	30	60	−30	22	
14	Wombwell Sporting Association	28	5	5	18	27	60	−33	20	Resigned to the Central Midlands League
15	Tadcaster Albion	28	1	7	20	19	75	−56	10	

Source: fchd
Rules for classification: 1) points; 2) goal difference; 3) number of goals scored.

=== Map ===
Location of the clubs in the 1987–88 NCEL Division Two on a map of Yorkshire and the Humber
