= 1990–91 Northern Counties East Football League =

The 1990–91 Northern Counties East Football League season was the 9th in the history of Northern Counties East Football League, a football competition in England. Division Two was disbanded at the end of the season. Most of the Division Two clubs were promoted to Division One.

== Premier Division ==
Northern Counties East Football League Premier Division
- Season: 1990–91
- Champions: Guiseley
- Promoted: Guiseley
- Matches: 240

The Premier Division featured 12 clubs which competed in the previous season, along with four new clubs.

- Clubs promoted from Division One:
  - Maltby Miners Welfare
  - Ossett Town
- Plus:
  - Spennymoor United, transferred from the Northern League
  - Winterton Rangers, promoted from Division Two

=== Map ===
Location of the clubs in the 1990–91 NCEL Premier Division on a map of Yorkshire and the Humber
Location of the clubs in the 1990–91 NCEL Premier Division on a map of the East Midlands
Location of the clubs in the 1990–91 NCEL Premier Division on a map of North East England

=== League table ===
Pos	Team	Pld	W	D	L	GF	GA	GD	Pts	Promotion or relegation
1	Guiseley	30	24	4	2	78	25	+53	76	Promoted to the Northern Premier League Division One
2	North Shields	30	23	2	5	75	29	+46	71	
3	Spennymoor United	30	19	4	7	55	29	+26	61	
4	North Ferriby United	30	14	8	8	55	42	+13	50	
5	Brigg Town	30	13	8	9	40	40	0	47	
6	Maltby Miners Welfare	30	13	7	10	44	46	−2	46	
7	Harrogate Railway Athletic	30	12	9	9	49	40	+9	45	
8	Ossett Town	30	10	10	10	42	38	+4	40	
9	Armthorpe Welfare	30	10	6	14	52	55	−3	36	
10	Winterton Rangers	30	9	9	12	49	65	−16	36	
11	Thackley	30	9	7	14	43	46	−3	34	
12	Sutton Town (Ashfield)	30	9	6	15	53	60	−7	33	
13	Belper Town	30	7	10	13	37	52	−15	31	
14	Ossett Albion	30	3	12	15	34	51	−17	21	
15	Denaby United	30	5	6	19	33	81	−48	21	
16	Pontefract Collieries	30	4	4	22	34	74	−40	16	

Rules for classification: 1) points; 2) goal difference; 3) number of goals scored.

== Division One ==
Northern Counties East Football League Division One
- Season: 1990–91
- Champions: Sheffield
- Promoted: Sheffield; Liversedge; Eccleshill United; Glasshoughton Welfare
- Matches: 156

Changes made before start of season:

- Clubs relegated from the Premier Division:
  - Grimethorpe Miners Welfare
  - Hallam
  - Hatfield Main
  - Sheffield
- Clubs promoted from Division Two:
  - Glasshoughton Welfare
  - Selby Town
  - Yorkshire Main

BSC Parkgate changed name to RES Parkgate. Collingham, Woolley Miners Welfare and Frecheville Community Association all left the league.

=== Map ===
Location of the clubs in the 1990–91 NCEL Division One on a map of Yorkshire and the Humber

=== League table ===
Pos	Team	Pld	W	D	L	GF	GA	GD	Pts	Promotion or relegation
1	Sheffield	24	21	1	2	60	16	+44	64	Promoted to the Premier Division
2	Hallam	24	18	1	5	61	27	+34	55	
3	Liversedge	24	15	2	7	61	35	+26	47	Promoted to the Premier Division
4	Pickering Town	24	15	2	7	54	41	+13	47	
5	Eccleshill United	24	14	2	8	58	36	+22	44	Promoted to the Premier Division
6	Garforth Town	24	11	7	6	45	33	+12	40	
7	Selby Town	24	10	3	11	60	41	+19	33	
8	Hatfield Main	24	9	5	10	38	42	−4	32	
9	RES Parkgate	24	7	6	11	40	49	−9	27	
10	York Railway Institute	24	7	3	14	32	47	−15	24	
11	Glasshoughton Welfare	24	4	5	15	18	50	−32	17	Promoted to the Premier Division
12	Yorkshire Main	24	2	3	19	16	61	−45	9	Resigned to the Sheffield & Hallamshire County Senior Football League
13	Mexborough Town	24	3	0	21	16	81	−65	9	Resigned to the Central Midlands League
14	Grimethorpe Miners Welfare	0	0	0	0	0	0	0	0	Record expunged

Rules for classification: 1) points; 2) goal difference; 3) number of goals scored.

== Division Two ==
Northern Counties East Football League Division Two
- Season: 1990–91
- Champions: Hall Road Rangers
- Promoted: Hall Road Rangers; Worsbrough Bridge Miners Welfare; Bradley Rangers; Yorkshire Amateur; Tadcaster Albion; Stocksbridge Park Steels; Immingham Town; Brodsworth Welfare
- Matches: 156
- Goals: 487 (3.12 per match)

Division One featured ten clubs which competed in the previous season, along with three new clubs, relegated from Division One:

- Immingham Town
- Kiveton Park
- Rowntree Mackintosh

=== Map ===
Location of the clubs in the 1988–89 NCEL Division Two on a map of Yorkshire and the Humber

=== League table ===
Pos	Team	Pld	W	D	L	GF	GA	GD	Pts	Promotion or relegation
1	Hall Road Rangers	24	15	5	4	42	25	+17	50	Promoted to Division One
2	Worsbrough Bridge Miners Welfare	24	14	5	5	45	22	+23	47	Promoted to Division One
3	Rowntree Mackintosh	24	12	8	4	46	25	+21	44	Resigned to the York Football League
4	Bradley Rangers	24	13	5	6	45	32	+13	44	Promoted to Division One
5	Yorkshire Amateur	24	13	3	8	47	37	+10	42	Promoted to Division One
6	Tadcaster Albion	24	11	3	10	39	34	+5	36	Promoted to Division One
7	Stocksbridge Park Steels	24	9	8	7	41	35	+6	35	Promoted to Division One
8	Fryston Colliery Welfare	24	9	4	11	44	44	0	31	Resigned to the Central Midlands League
9	Immingham Town	24	7	7	10	29	43	−14	28	Promoted to Division One
10	Kiveton Park	24	7	4	13	30	43	−13	25	Resigned to the Central Midlands League
11	Dronfield United	24	5	6	13	29	40	−11	21	Resigned to the Central Midlands League
12	Brodsworth Miners Welfare	24	4	5	15	25	51	−26	17	Promoted to Division One
13	Pilkington Recreation	24	3	5	16	25	56	−31	14	Club disbanded

Rules for classification: 1) points; 2) goal difference; 3) number of goals scored.
