= YMFC =

YMFC may refer to:

- Yorkshire Main F.C.
- 23S rRNA pseudouridine2457 synthase, an enzyme
- Young Ministers For Christ
