= Kinsley Boys F.C. =

Association football club in England

Kinsley Boys
- Full name: Kinsley Boys Football Club
- Founded: 1962
- Ground: Kinsley Playing Fields
- League: Northern Counties East League Division One
- 2025–26: Central Midlands Alliance Premier Division North, 1st of 17 (promoted)
Home colours

Kinsley Boys Football Club is a football club based in Kinsley near Wakefield in West Yorkshire, England. The club plays in the Northern Counties East League Division One.

== History ==
The club was founded as Kinsley Village F.C.. in 1962 as an under 18s side. The club then progressed as a senior side playing in various local leagues before winning promotion to the Central Midlands League in 2007–08, following the club finishing as champions of the Doncaster & District Senior League. After five seasons in the Central Midlands League, the last being in the North Division, the club transferred to the Sheffield and Hallamshire County Senior League, at the same level but with reduced travel. After one season in that league they were moved back to the Central Midlands League, remaining in this division until rejoining the Doncaster & District Senior League for the 2015–16 season.

The club participated in the FA Vase for the first time in 2011–12, reaching the first round proper in 2013–14.. Kinsley struggled to operate a team over the next decade, withdrawing from leagues on three occasions before finishing second bottom of the Doncaster Senior League First Division in 2024. They transferred to the Central Midlands Alliance League once again that year, and won promotion to the Premier Division North in their first season, and subsequently won the Premier Division North title in 2026 to earn promotion to the Northern Counties East League for the first time.

== Controversies ==
Season	Division	Level	Position	FA Vase	Notes
Formed as Kinsley Colts
1975–76	Doncaster Senior League Division 3	-		-	Promoted
1976–77	Doncaster Senior League Division 2	-		-	Promoted
1977–78	Doncaster Senior League Division 1	-	6th/12	-	
1978–79	Doncaster Senior League Division 1	-		-	
1979–80	Doncaster Senior League Division 1	-		-	
1980–81	Doncaster Senior League Division 1	-	7th/16	-	
1981–82	Doncaster Senior League Division 1	-	5th/14	-	
1982–83	Doncaster Senior League Division 1	-	6th/14	-	
1983–84	Doncaster Senior League Division 1	-	8th/15	-	
1984–85	Doncaster Senior League Division 1	-	5th/14	-	
Changed name to Kinsley Boys (1985)
1985–86	Doncaster Senior League Division 1	-	1st/14	-	Promoted
1986–87	Doncaster Senior League Premier Division	-	6th/14	-	
1987–88	Doncaster Senior League Premier Division	-	1st/11	-	
1988–89	Doncaster Senior League Premier Division	-	8th/13	-	
1989–90	Doncaster Senior League Premier Division	-	2nd/13	-	
1990–91	Doncaster Senior League Premier Division	-	9th/14	-	
1991–92	Doncaster Senior League Premier Division	-	7th/13	-	
1992–93	Doncaster Senior League Premier Division	-	5th/15	-	
1993–94	Doncaster Senior League Premier Division	-	1st/14	-	
1994–95	Doncaster Senior League Premier Division	-	1st/11	-	
1995–96	Doncaster Senior League Premier Division	-	5th/13	-	
1996–97	Doncaster Senior League Premier Division	-	13th/14	-	
1997–98	Doncaster Senior League Premier Division	-	5th/14	-	
2000–01	Doncaster Senior League Division 1	-	6th/12	-	
2001–02	Doncaster Senior League Division 1	-	3rd/13	-	Promoted
2002–03	Doncaster Senior League Premier Division	-	10th/13	-	
2003–04	Doncaster Senior League Premier Division	-	11th/13	-	
2004–05	Doncaster Senior League Premier Division	-	2nd/14	-	
2005–06	Doncaster Senior League Premier Division	-	2nd/14	-	
2006–07	Doncaster Senior League Premier Division	-	1st/15	-	
2007–08	Central Midlands League Supreme Division	12	7th/20	-	Promoted
2008–09	Central Midlands League Supreme Division	11	11th/18	-	
2009–10	Central Midlands League Supreme Division	11	9th/18	-	
2010–11	Central Midlands League Supreme Division	11	4th/18	-	
2011–12	Central Midlands League North Division	11	6th/17	2nd Qualifying Round	
2012–13	Sheffield & Hallamshire County Senior League Premier Division	11	12th/15	2nd Qualifying Round	
2013–14	Central Midlands League North Division	11	7th/17	1st round	
2014–15	Central Midlands League North Division	11	Withdrew	-	
2015–16	Doncaster Senior League Premier Division	14	7th/8	-	
2016–17	Doncaster Senior League Premier Division	14	Withdrew	-	
2017–18	Doncaster Senior League Premier Division	14	7th/10	-	
2018–19	Doncaster Senior League Premier Division	14	2nd/9	-	
2019–20	Sheffield & Hallamshire County Senior League Division Two	13			League season abandoned due to COVID-19
2020–21	Sheffield & Hallamshire County Senior League Division One	12			League season abandoned due to COVID-19
2021–22	Sheffield & Hallamshire County Senior League Division One	12	13th/14		
2022–23	Sheffield & Hallamshire County Senior League Division One	12	Withdrew		
2023–24	Doncaster Senior League Division One	15	10th/11		
2024–25	Central Midlands League Division One North	12	2nd/13		Promoted
2025–26	Central Midlands League Premier Division North	11	1st/16		Promoted (champions)
2026–27	Northern Counties East League Division One	10			
Source: FCHD

== Records ==
- FA Vase
  - Second Qualifying Round 2011–12, 2012–13
  - First Round 2013–14
