= Hemsworth West End F.C. =

Hemsworth West End
- Full name: Hemsworth West End Football Club
- Ground: West End Ground, Hemsworth, West Yorkshire

Hemsworth West End Football Club was an English association football club based in Hemsworth, West Yorkshire. In the 1925–26 season the club reached the final of the Sheffield Challenge Cup, the oldest county cup in England and fourth oldest surviving cup competition in England.

== History ==
Currently, the first known record of the club is in the 1920–21 season, when the club were competing in the Hemsworth Charity League and the Hemsworth Combination League simultaneously. By the 1922–23 season the club were competing in the South Elmsall Football League and by the 1924–25 season the club had joined the Barnsley Association League and also the Hemsworth and District Football League. The 1924–25 season was a hugely important one for the club, who secured four cup and league titles in the season.

In the 1925 season the club were beaten finalists in the Sheffield Senior Cup. In the semi-final they easily beat Frickley Colliery (who have won the cup a record 14 times) but were roundly beaten by Wath Athletic in the final at Tickhill Square. The 1926–27 season saw the club continuing to compete in the Barnsley Association League and reach the semi-finals of the Sheffield Senior Cup, beaten in extra-time by Ecclesfield.

By this time the club were strong enough to have both a senior side and junior teams, so strong that boys from the club were selected for the Hemsworth Schoolboys team competing in the English Schools Shield. The 1927/28 season saw the club win the Royston Charity Cup, Pontefract Infirmary Cup and Sides Football Cup, resulting in them playing a 'Cup Winners' final against South Kirkby Colliery, winners of the Doncaster Senior League. By the 1928/29 season the club were still competing in the Barnsley Association League and in the 1929/30 season the club won the Royston Charity Cup again but a current lack of known records after this season makes it impossible to ascertain what year the club finally folded.

== Ground ==
Not much is known about the West End Ground other than it formerly hosted finals of the Hemsworth Hospital Cup.

== FA Cup ==
The club first played in the FA Cup in the 1925–26 season, reaching the fourth qualifying round at the first attempt, where they lost to Kettering Town. The official FA Cup records for the 1925–26 season show that the Anston Athletic and Hemsworth West End was a 3–1 win to Hemsworth. However, many newspapers of the day printed reports that the game ended 3-3 and no replay seems to have ever happened.

=== FA Cup results ===
Season	Round	Opponent	Result	Replay
1925–26	First qualifying round	(England) Bullcroft Main	0–0	2–0
1925–26	Second qualifying round	(England) Rossington Main	4–2	
1925–26	Third qualifying round	(England) Anston Athletic	3–1	
1925–26	Fourth qualifying round	(England) Kettering Town	5–0	
1926–27	Preliminary round	(England) Maltby Main	3–3	2-1
1926–27	First qualifying round	(England) Birdwell	3–2	
1926–27	Second qualifying round	(England) Ardsley Athletic	1–1	3-2
1926–27	Third qualifying round	(England) Brodsworth Main	3–0	
1927–28	Preliminary round	(England) Hallam	1–1	4-2

== Records ==
- Furthest FA Cup run – 4th qualifying round, 1925–26

== Notable players ==
The most notable player to have appeared for Hemsworth West End in their short history is centre forward William Coulson who transferred to Barnsley in the 1928–29 season.

== Honours ==
- Hemsworth Hospital Cup
  - Winners 1924–25
- Sheffield and Hallamshire Senior Cup
  - Runners-up 1925–26
- Hooton Pagnell Cup
  - Winners 1926–27
- Royston Charity Cup
  - Winners 1927–28, 1929–30
  - Runners-up 1926–27
- Sides Football Cup
  - Winners 1927–28
- Doncaster and District Senior League Division Three
  - Winners 1973–74
- Doncaster and District Senior League Division Two
  - Winners 1974–75
