= Yorkshire Main F.C. =

Association football club in England

Coordinates: 53°29′24.23″N 1°10′44.95″W

Yorkshire Main
- Full name: Yorkshire Main Football Club
- Founded: 1960; 66 years ago
- Ground: Edlington Lane, Edlington
- Chairman: Matthew Wynne & Dominic Gibbs
- Manager: Ryan Ambler
- League: Central Midlands Alliance Premier Division North
- 2024–25: Central Midlands Alliance Premier Division North, 14th of 17
Home colours

Yorkshire Main Football Club is a football club based in Edlington, Doncaster, South Yorkshire, England. They play in the Central Midlands Alliance Premier Division North.

== History ==
The club, representing the Yorkshire Main Colliery, claims to have been formed in 1925 as Edlington Rangers, who did use the Yorkshire Main name for a two-year spell in the 1940s before folding in 1958.

A new Yorkshire Main Colliery FC was formed in 1960 and entered the Doncaster & District Senior League. After two separate spells out (between 1967 and 1971, and 1977 and 1980), they returned to the league again in 1980, and subsequently won the Third Division title. A year later they joined the Sheffield Association League, winning the Division Two title. In the summer of 1982 the Association League merged with the Hatchard League to form the Sheffield & Hallamshire County Senior League (S&HCSL), and Yorkshire Main Colliery were placed in Division One, eventually securing a league and cup double in the competition's inaugural campaign.

On the back of their success in the S&HCSL, the club decided to join the Northern Counties East League (NCEL) in 1983, being entered into Division Two South. After two seasons of league restructuring, they found themselves in Division Two. In 1986 they became Yorkshire Main after the closure of the colliery. In 1990 they won promotion to the NCEL Division One, and the following year they entered the FA Vase for the first (and only) time.

The club dropped out of the NCEL in 1991 after finishing second bottom, and rejoined the Sheffield & Hallamshire County Senior League. They spent seven seasons back in the S&HCSL, during which time they were relegated from Division One to Division Two, and in 1998 they decided to leave to join the Central Midlands League (CMFL), entering the Premier Division.

They spent ten seasons in the Premier Division before winning promotion to the Supreme Division in 2008, only spending one year in the CMFL's top flight before being relegated back again due to the club's lack of floodlights. This problem was rectified in 2010, and just a year later they won the CMFL Floodlit Cup, the CM Premier Championship, the Doncaster and District FA Challenge Cup and the League Cup. The next season they were placed in the North Division when the CMFL restructured, but in 2013 Yorkshire Main left the league.

They rejoined the Doncaster & District Senior League, finishing bottom of the Premier Division in their first season back in the competition.

=== Season-by-season record ===
| Season | Division | Level | Position | FA Vase | Notes |
|---|---|---|---|---|---|
| 1960–61 | Doncaster & District Senior League Division Three | – | | – | |
| 1961–62 | Doncaster & District Senior League Division Three | – | | – | |
| 1962–63 | Doncaster & District Senior League Division Three | – | 10th/13 | – | |
| 1963–64 | Doncaster & District Senior League Division Three | – | 5th/14 | – | Promoted |
| 1964–65 | Doncaster & District Senior League Division Two | – | 12th/12 | – | |
| 1965–66 | Doncaster & District Senior League Division Two | – | 9th/13 | – | |
| 1966–67 | Doncaster & District Senior League Division Two | – | | – | |
Club dissolved (1967) and reformed (1971)
| 1971–72 | Doncaster & District Senior League Division Three | – | | – | Promoted |
| 1972–73 | Doncaster & District Senior League Division Two | – | | – | Promoted |
| 1973–74 | Doncaster & District Senior League Division One | – | | – | |
| 1974–75 | Doncaster & District Senior League Division One | – | | – | |
| 1975–76 | Doncaster & District Senior League Division One | – | | – | |
| 1976–77 | Doncaster & District Senior League Division One | – | | – | |
Club dissolved (1977) and reformed (1980)
| 1980–81 | Doncaster & District Senior League Division Three | – | 1st/15 | – | League champions |
| 1981–82 | Sheffield Association League Division Two | – | 1st/15 | – | League champions, promoted |
| 1982–83 | Sheffield Association League Division One | – | 1st/15 | – | League champions |
| 1983–84 | Northern Counties East League Division Two South | – | 6th/13 | – | |
| 1984–85 | Northern Counties East League Division One Central | – | 12th/16 | – | |
| 1985–86 | Northern Counties East League Division Two | – | 13th/16 | – | |
| 1986–87 | Northern Counties East League Division Two | – | 15th/18 | – | |
| 1987–88 | Northern Counties East League Division Two | – | 17th/15 | – | |
| 1988–89 | Northern Counties East League Division Two | – | 18th/14 | – | |
| 1989–90 | Northern Counties East League Division Two | – | 5th/14 | – | Promoted |
| 1990–91 | Northern Counties East League Division One | – | 12th/13 | 1R | |
| 1991–92 | Sheffield & Hallamshire County Senior League Division One | – | 4th/11 | – | |
| 1992–93 | Sheffield & Hallamshire County Senior League Division One | – | 8th/14 | – | |
| 1993–94 | Sheffield & Hallamshire County Senior League Division One | - | 7th/13 | – | |
| 1994–95 | Sheffield & Hallamshire County Senior League Division One | - | 13th/14 | – | |
| 1995–96 | Sheffield & Hallamshire County Senior League Division One | - | 13th/13 | – | Relegated |
| 1996–97 | Sheffield & Hallamshire County Senior League Division Two | - | 9th/15 | – | |
| 1997–98 | Sheffield & Hallamshire County Senior League Division Two | - | 7th/15 | – | |
| 1998–99 | Central Midlands League Premier Division | – | 9th/15 | – | |
| 1999–00 | Central Midlands League Premier Division | – | 10th/16 | – | |
| 2000–01 | Central Midlands League Premier Division | – | 16th/17 | – | |
| 2001–02 | Central Midlands League Premier Division | – | 18th/20 | – | |
| 2002–03 | Central Midlands League Premier Division | – | 17th/17 | – | |
| 2003–04 | Central Midlands League Premier Division | – | 14th/19 | – | |
| 2004–05 | Central Midlands League Premier Division | 12 | 18th/19 | – | |
| 2005–06 | Central Midlands League Premier Division | 12 | 15th/20 | – | |
| 2006–07 | Central Midlands League Premier Division | 12 | 14th/19 | – | |
| 2007–08 | Central Midlands League Premier Division | 12 | 3rd/20 | – | Promoted |
| 2008–09 | Central Midlands League Supreme Division | 11 | 10th/18 | – | Relegated |
| 2009–10 | Central Midlands League Premier Division | 12 | 4th/16 | – | |
| 2010–11 | Central Midlands League Premier Division | 12 | 1st/15 | – | League champions |
| 2011–12 | Central Midlands League North Division | 11 | 5th/17 | – | |
| 2012–13 | Central Midlands League North Division | 11 | 16th/17 | – | |
| 2013–14 | Doncaster & District Senior League Premier Division | 14 | 8th/8 | – | |
| 2014–15 | Doncaster & District Senior League Premier Division | 14 | 4th/9 | – | |
| 2015–16 | Doncaster & District Senior League Division One | 15 | 4th/8 | – | |
| 2016–17 | Doncaster & District Senior League Division One | 15 | 1st/8 | – | League champions, promoted |
| 2017–18 | Doncaster & District Senior League Premier Division | 14 | 9th/10 | – | |
| 2018–19 | Doncaster & District Senior League Premier Division | 14 | 7th/8 | – | |
| 2019–20 | Doncaster & District Senior League Premier Division | 14 | - | – | Season abandoned owing to COVID-19 pandemic |
| 2020–21 | Doncaster Saturday League Premier Division | 14 | 7th/11 | – | |
| 2021–22 | Doncaster Saturday League Premier Division | 14 | 3rd/12 | – | |
| 2022–23 | Central Midlands League North Division | 11 | 9th/15 | – | |
| 2023–24 | Central Midlands League North Division | 11 | 5th/16 | – | |
| 2024–25 | Central Midlands League North Division | 11 | 14th/16 | – | |
| Season | Division | Level | Position | FA Vase | Notes |
Source: Football Club History Database

=== Notable former players ===
Players that have played in the Football League either before or after playing for Yorkshire Main:

- Glynn Snodin
- Joe Harvey

== Ground ==
The club plays on Edlington Lane in Edlington, postcode DN4 9LT.

=== Gallery ===
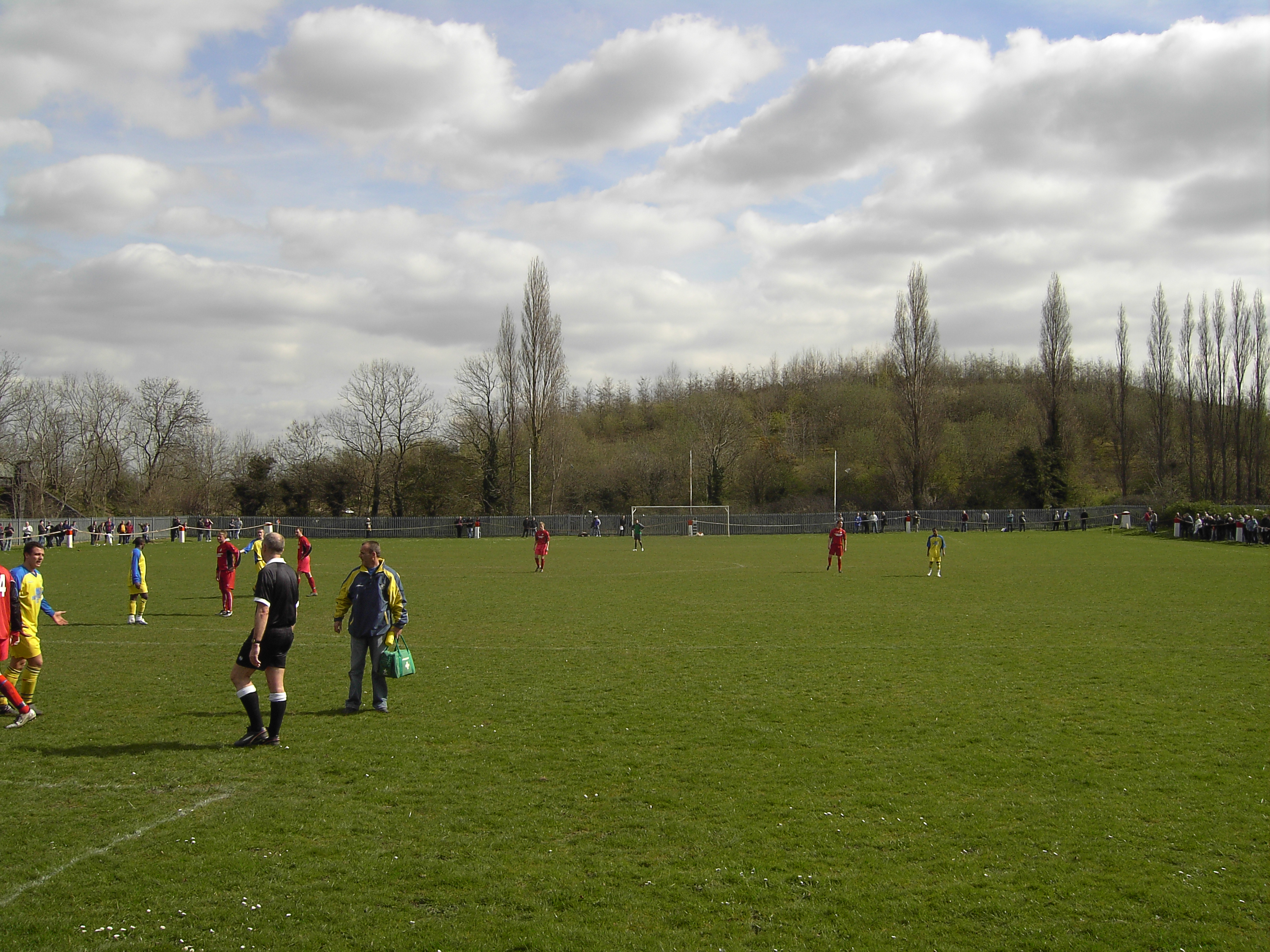
View towards Lord's Head Lane end.

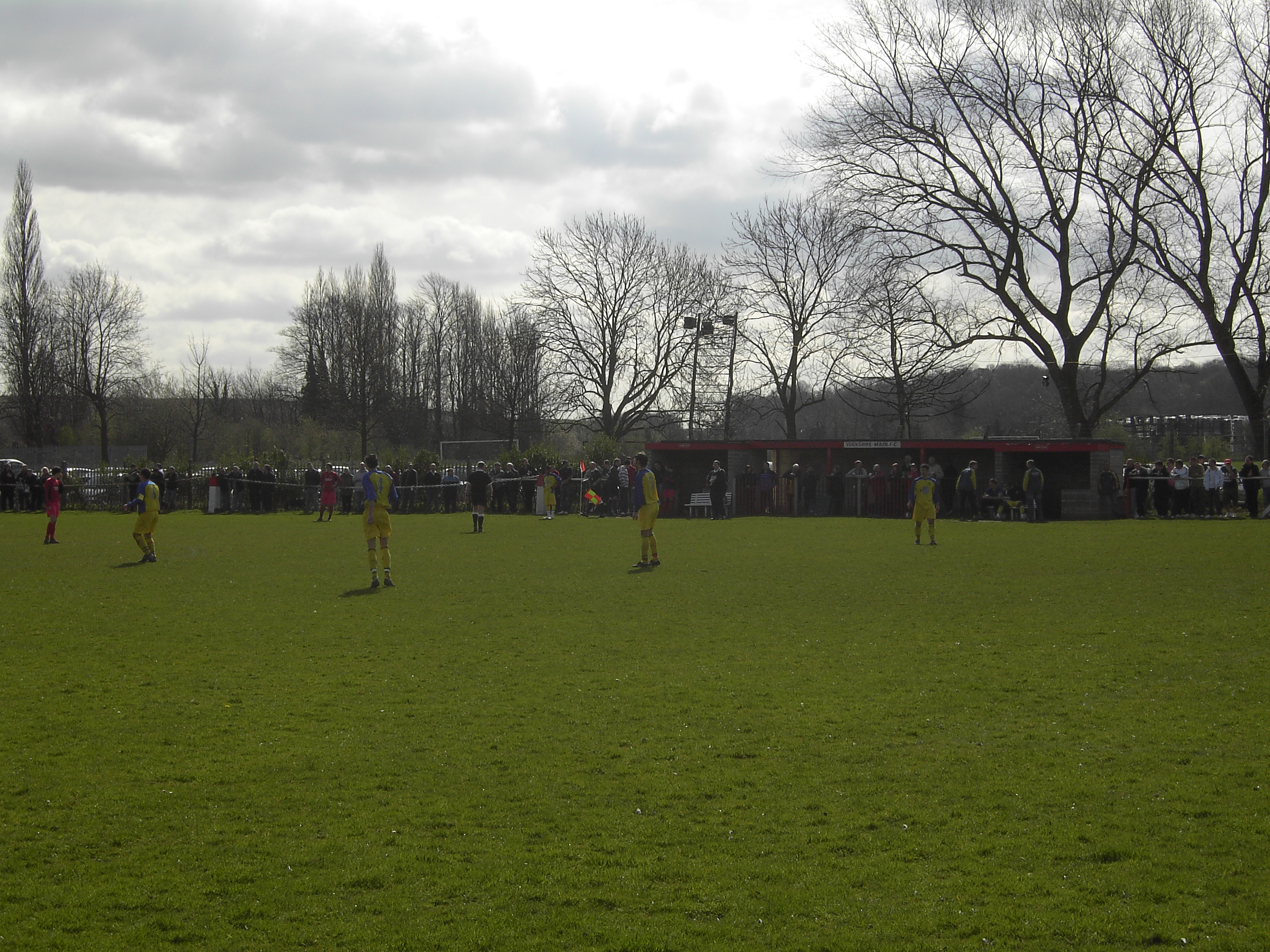
Main stand.

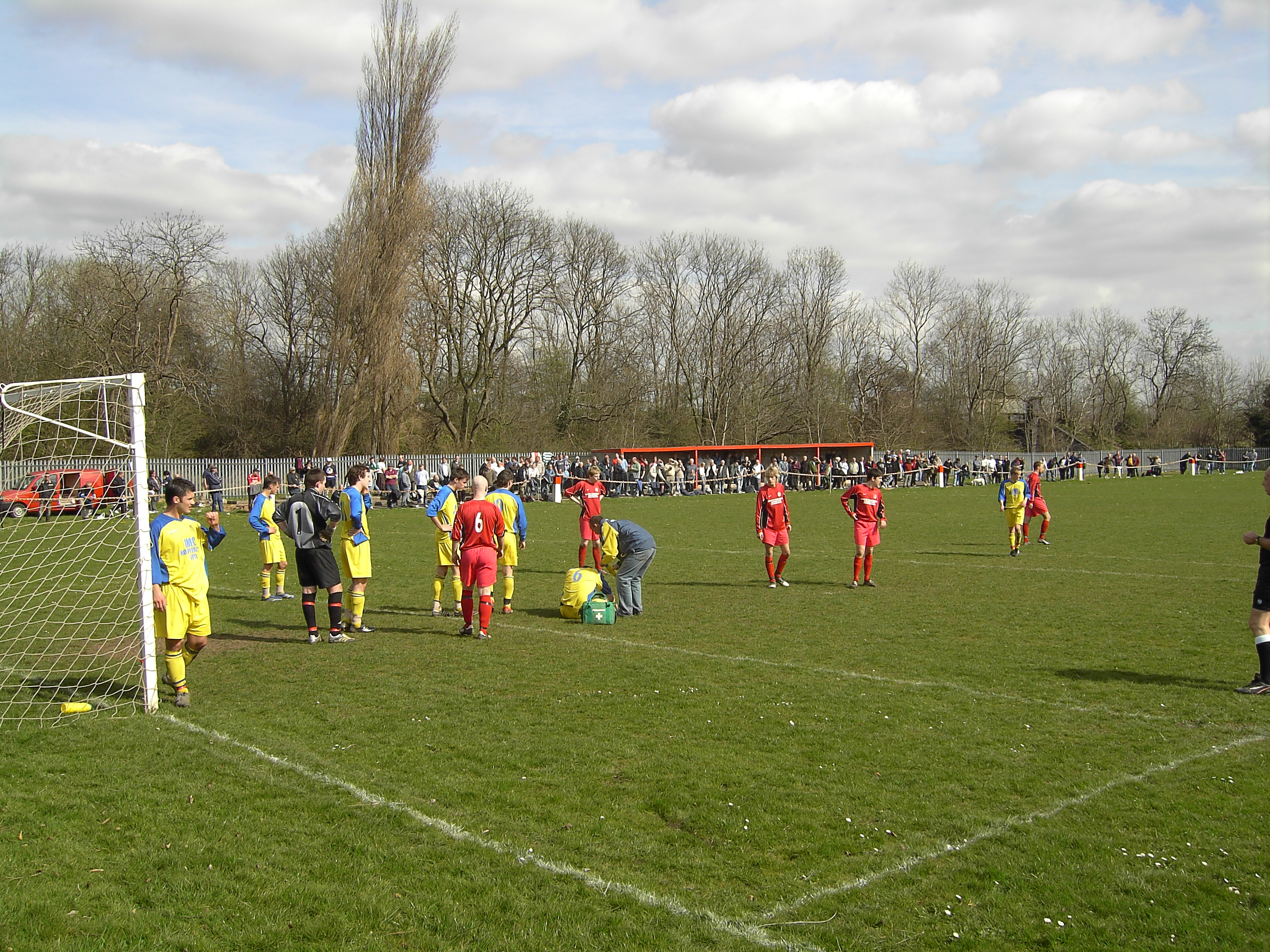
Railway side and stand.

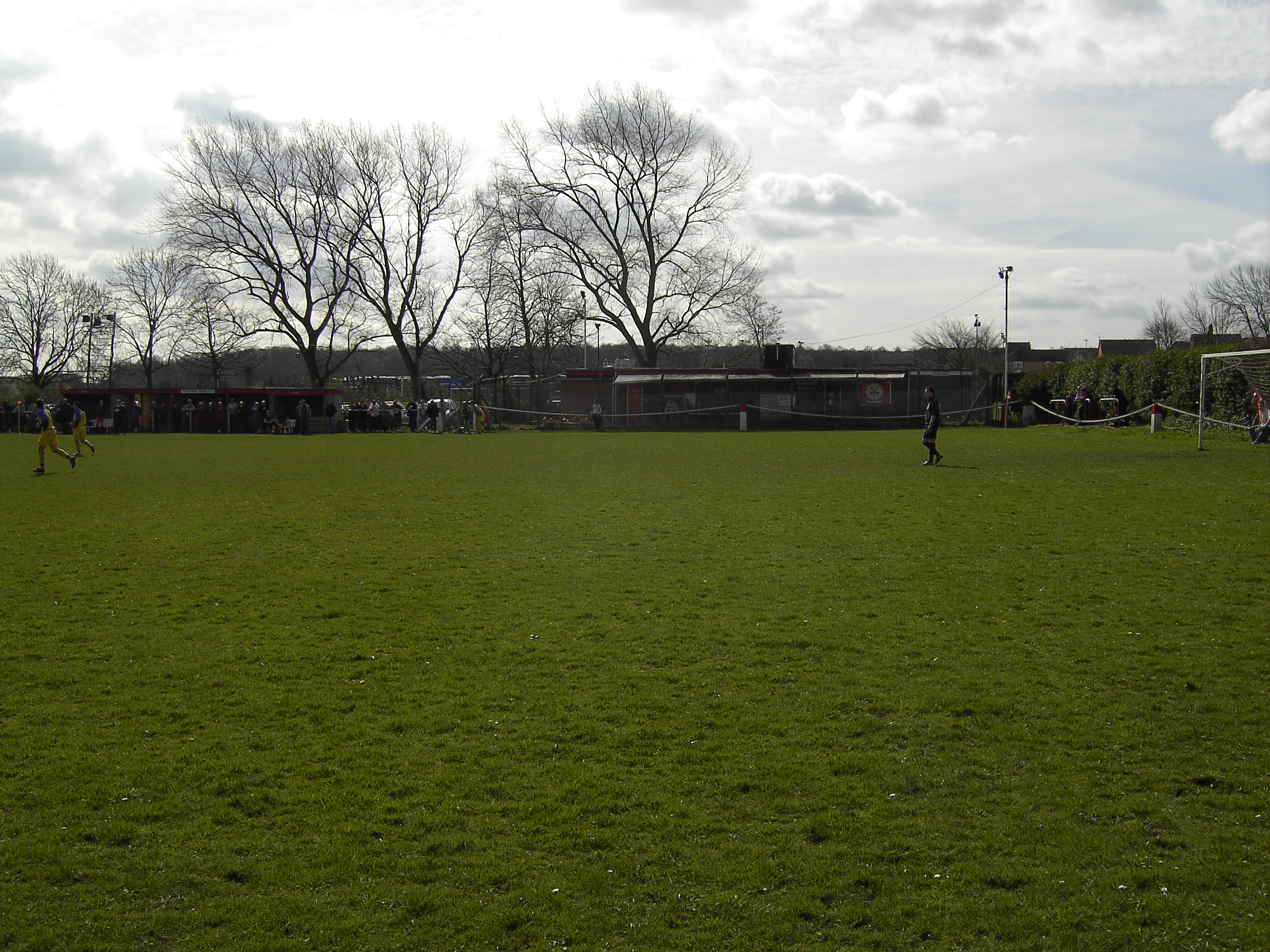
Changing rooms, tea bar and ground paybox entrance.

== Honours ==
=== League ===
- Northern Counties East League Division Two
  - Promoted: 1989–90
- Central Midlands League Premier Division
  - Champions: 2010–11
  - Promoted: 2007–08
- Sheffield Association League Division One
  - Champions: 1982–83
- Sheffield Association League Division Two
  - Promoted: 1981–82 (champions)
- Doncaster & District Senior League Division Three
  - Champions: 1980–81

== Records ==
- Best League performance: 12th in Northern Counties East League Division One, 1990–91
- Best FA Vase performance: 1st Round, 1990–91
