= 23S rRNA pseudouridine2457 synthase =

Class of enzymes

23S rRNA pseudouridine^{2457} synthase

Identifiers
- EC no.: 5.4.99.20

Databases
- IntEnz: IntEnz view
- BRENDA: BRENDA entry
- ExPASy: NiceZyme view
- KEGG: KEGG entry
- MetaCyc: metabolic pathway
- PRIAM: profile
- PDB structures: RCSB PDB PDBe PDBsum
Search
- PMC: articles
- PubMed: articles
- NCBI: proteins

23S rRNA pseudouridine^{2457} synthase (EC 5.4.99.20, RluE, YmfC) is an enzyme with systematic name 23S rRNA-uridine^{2457} uracil mutase. This enzyme catalyses the following chemical reaction

23S rRNA uridine^{2457} $\rightleftharpoons$ 23S rRNA pseudouridine^{2457}

The enzyme modifies uridine^{2457} in a stem of 23S rRNA in Escherichia coli.
