= Harworth Colliery F.C. =

Association football club in England

Coordinates: 53°24′55.61″N 1°03′08.04″W

Harworth Colliery
- Full name: Harworth Colliery Football Club
- Founded: 1931 (as Harworth Colliery Athletic)
- Ground: Recreation Ground, Bircotes
- Capacity: 2,000
- Chairman: Jony Wilson
- League: Central Midlands Alliance Premier Division North
- 2024–25: Central Midlands Alliance Premier Division North, 5th of 16
Home colours

Harworth Colliery Football Club is an English football club based in Harworth and Bircotes, Nottinghamshire. The club are currently members of the Central Midlands Alliance Premier Division North.

== History ==
The club was formed as Harworth Colliery Athletic in 1931 and initially played in local leagues before joining the Yorkshire League as Harworth Colliery Institute after the Second World War, remaining in that League until the Northern Counties East League was formed in 1982. Harworth spent four years in that league before joining the Central Midlands League as a founder member of the Supreme Division. Runners-up in the first season, Harworth Colliery was top in the following season. The club was relegated to the Premier Division in 2001 before being placed back in the Supreme Division when the League was reorganised.

In the 1979–80 season, the club reached the third round of the FA Vase competition. Harworth has also competed in the FA Cup but has never progressed past the second qualifying round.

After a few shaky years in the Central Midlands Division One finishing in the lower regions of the league the club took the opportunity to be promoted to the Supreme Division for the 2008–09 season. The team was top of the league for the majority of the season, but with injuries and suspensions towards the end of the season the team finished in seventh place. After the season, the manager Mark Brogan stepped down after two years in charge.

=== Season-by-season record ===
| Season | Division | Level | Position | FA Cup | FA Vase | Notes |
|---|---|---|---|---|---|---|
| 1930–31 | Doncaster Red Triangle League Division Two | – | | – | – | |
| 1931–32 | Doncaster Red Triangle League Division Two | – | | – | – | |
| 1932–33 | Doncaster Red Triangle League Division Two | – | | – | – | |
| 1933–34 | Club did not enter any competitions | | | | | |
| 1934–35 | Club did not enter any competitions | | | | | |
| 1935–36 | Club did not enter any competitions | | | | | |
| 1936–37 | Doncaster Red Triangle League | – | Withdrew | – | – | |
| 1937–38 | Club did not enter any competitions | | | | | |
| 1938–39 | Doncaster Senior League | – | 1st/11 | – | – | League champions |
| 1939–40 | Doncaster Senior League | – | 1st/9 | – | – | League champions |
| 1940–41 | Doncaster Senior League | – | 1st/11 | – | – | League champions |
| 1941–42 | Doncaster Senior League | – | | – | – | |
| 1942–43 | Club did not enter any competitions due to World War II | | | | | |
| 1943–44 | Club did not enter any competitions due to World War II | | | | | |
| 1944–45 | Club did not enter any competitions due to World War II | | | | | |
| 1945–46 | Sheffield Association League | – | | | | |
| 1946–47 | Yorkshire League | – | 12th/20 | 1QR | – | |
| 1947–48 | Yorkshire League | – | 4th/20 | 1QR | – | |
| 1948–49 | Yorkshire League | – | 15th/20 | 3QR | – | |
| 1949–50 | Doncaster Senior League Division Two | – | 1st/14 | PR | – | |
| 1950–51 | Doncaster Senior League Division One | – | | – | – | |
| 1951–52 | Doncaster Senior League Division One | – | | – | – | |
| 1952–53 | Sheffield Association League | – | | – | – | |
| 1953–54 | Sheffield Association League | – | | – | – | |
| 1954–55 | Sheffield Association League | – | 12th/17 | – | – | |
| 1955–56 | Sheffield Association League | – | | – | – | |
| 1956–57 | Sheffield Association League | – | 16th/16 | – | – | |
| 1957–58 | Sheffield Association League | – | | – | – | |
| 1958–59 | Sheffield Association League | – | | – | – | |
| 1959–60 | Sheffield Association League | – | | – | – | |
| 1960–61 | Sheffield Association League | – | | – | – | |
| 1961–62 | Sheffield Association League | – | | – | – | |
| 1962–63 | Sheffield Association League Division One | – | | – | – | |
| 1963–64 | Sheffield Association League Division One | – | 12th/16 | – | – | |
| 1964–65 | Sheffield Association League Division One | – | 1st/16 | – | – | League champions |
| 1965–66 | Sheffield Association League Division One | – | 3rd/16 | – | – | |
| 1966–67 | Sheffield Association League Division One | – | 14th/18 | – | – | |
| 1967–68 | Sheffield Association League Division One | – | 8th/16 | – | – | |
| 1968–69 | Sheffield Association League Division One | – | | – | – | |
| 1969–70 | Sheffield Association League Division One | – | | – | – | |
| 1970–71 | Sheffield Association League Division One | – | | – | – | |
| 1971–72 | Sheffield Association League Division One | – | 4th/15 | – | – | |
| 1972–73 | Sheffield Association League Division One | – | 5th/16 | – | – | |
| 1973–74 | Sheffield Association League Division One | – | 3rd/16 | – | – | |
| 1974–75 | Sheffield Association League Division One | – | | – | – | |
| 1975–76 | Sheffield Association League Division One | – | 1st/16 | – | – | League champions |
| 1976–77 | Sheffield Association League Division One | – | 2nd/16 | – | – | |
| 1977–78 | Yorkshire League Division Three | – | 10th/16 | – | – | |
| 1978–79 | Yorkshire League Division Three | – | 3rd/15 | – | – | Promoted |
| 1979–80 | Yorkshire League Division Two | – | 11th/16 | – | 3R | |
| 1980–81 | Yorkshire League Division Two | – | 8th/16 | – | 1R | |
| 1981–82 | Yorkshire League Division Two | – | 10th/16 | – | PR | |
| 1982–83 | Northern Counties East League Division One South | – | 11th/14 | – | – | |
| 1983–84 | Northern Counties East League Division One South | – | 14th/14 | – | – | |
| 1984–85 | Northern Counties East League Division One South | – | 5th/16 | – | – | |
| 1985–86 | Northern Counties East League Division One | – | 8th/16 | – | EPR | |
| 1986–87 | Central Midlands League Supreme Division | - | 2nd/13 | - | 1R | |
| 1987–88 | Central Midlands League Supreme Division | - | 1st/17 | - | 1R | League champions |
| 1988–89 | Central Midlands League Supreme Division | - | 5th/17 | 2QR | 1R | |
| 1989–90 | Central Midlands League Supreme Division | - | 4th/20 | PR | PR | |
| 1990–91 | Central Midlands League Supreme Division | - | 6th/17 | 1QR | 1R | |
| 1991–92 | Central Midlands League Supreme Division | - | 4th/18 | 1QR | 2R | |
| 1992–93 | Central Midlands League Supreme Division | - | 4th/16 | PR | PR | |
| 1993–94 | Central Midlands League Supreme Division | - | 14th/17 | PR | PR | |
| 1994–95 | Central Midlands League Supreme Division | - | 8th/17 | - | PR | |
| 1995–96 | Central Midlands League Supreme Division | - | 11th/17 | PR | 2QR | |
| 1996–97 | Central Midlands League Supreme Division | - | 15th/16 | PR | 2QR | |
| 1997–98 | Central Midlands League Supreme Division | - | 13th/16 | - | 2QR | |
| 1998–99 | Central Midlands League Supreme Division | - | 19th/19 | - | - | |
| 1999–00 | Central Midlands League Supreme Division | - | 18th/19 | - | - | |
| 2000–01 | Central Midlands League Supreme Division | - | 20th/20 | - | - | Relegated |
| 2001–02 | Central Midlands League Premier Division | - | 19th/20 | - | - | |
| 2002–03 | Central Midlands League Premier Division | - | 9th/17 | - | - | |
| 2003–04 | Central Midlands League Premier Division | - | 10th/19 | - | - | |
| 2004–05 | Central Midlands League Premier Division | 12 | 19th/19 | - | - | |
| 2005–06 | Central Midlands League Premier Division | 12 | 20th/20 | - | - | |
| 2006–07 | Central Midlands League Premier Division | 12 | 15th/19 | - | - | |
| 2007–08 | Central Midlands League Premier Division | 12 | 17th/20 | - | - | Promoted |
| 2008–09 | Central Midlands League Supreme Division | 11 | 7th/18 | - | - | |
| 2009–10 | Central Midlands League Supreme Division | 11 | 12th/18 | - | - | |
| 2010–11 | Central Midlands League Supreme Division | 11 | 11th/18 | - | - | |
| 2011–12 | Central Midlands League North Division | 11 | 11th/17 | - | - | |
| 2012–13 | Central Midlands League North Division | 11 | 5th/17 | - | - | |
| 2013–14 | Central Midlands League North Division | 11 | 4th/17 | - | - | |
| 2014–15 | Central Midlands League North Division | 11 | 8th/18 | - | - | |
| 2015–16 | Central Midlands League North Division | 11 | 5th/15 | - | 2QR | |
| 2016–17 | Central Midlands League North Division | 11 | 10th/16 | - | 1QR | |
| 2017–18 | Central Midlands League North Division | 11 | 1st/18 | - | - | League champions, promoted |
| 2018–19 | Northern Counties East League Division One | 10 | 20th/20 | – | 1QR | Relegated |
| 2019–20 | Central Midlands League North Division | 11 | - | - | 1QR | League season abandoned owing to COVID-19 pandemic |
| 2020–21 | Central Midlands League North Division | 11 | - | - | - | League season abandoned owing to COVID-19 pandemic |
| 2021–22 | Central Midlands League North Division | 11 | 6th/18 | - | - | |
| 2022–23 | Central Midlands League North Division | 11 | 6th/15 | - | - | |
| 2023–24 | Central Midlands League Premier Division North | 11 | 10th/16 | - | - | |
| 2023–24 | Central Midlands League Premier Division North | 11 | 6th/16 | - | - | |
| Season | Division | Level | Position | FA Cup | FA Vase | Notes |
Source: FCHD

== Honours ==
- Sheffield and Hallamshire Senior Cup
  - Winners 1947–48
  - Runners-up 1948–49, 1996–97
- Central Midlands Football League Supreme Division
  - Champions 1987–88
  - Runners-up 1986–87
- Sheffield and Hallamshire County Senior Football League
  - Champions 1964–65, 1976–77
  - Abacus Lighting Floodlit Cup
  - Runners Up 2024/25

== Records ==
- FA Cup
  - Second qualifying round 1988–89
- FA Vase
  - Third round 1979–80
