= Doncaster Saturday Football League =

Association football league in England

- Founded: 1925
- Country: England
- Divisions: 2

The Doncaster Saturday Football League is a football competition for clubs in the Doncaster area of England.

== History ==
The competition was formed as the Doncaster & District Senior League for the 1925–26 season. In 2020, it was renamed the Doncaster Saturday Football League.

== Current member clubs (2022–23) ==
=== Premier Division ===
- Adwick Park Foresters
- Armthorpe Welfare reserves
- Bawtry Town
- Bentley Village
- Brodsworth Welfare
- Denaby United
- Epworth Town Colts
- Gainsborough Town
- Maltby Juniors
- Rossington Main reserves
- St Joseph's Rockware of Worksop reserves

=== Division One ===
- Airmyn
- Askern Miners reserves
- AFC Bentley reserves
- Bessacarr reserves
- Bridon
- Doncaster City Vikings
- Doncaster Town
- Epworth Town Colts development
- ISG Doncaster
- Kinsley Boys
- New Inn
- Pilkingtons
- Upton United Juniors
- Yorkshire Main reserves

== League champions ==
Season	
1925–26	Armthorpe
1926–27	Thorne Colliery
1927–28	South Kirkby Colliery
1928–29	Pilkington Recreation
1929–30	Pilkington Recreation
1930–31	South Kirkby Colliery
1931–32	Pilkington Recreation
1932–33	Hatfield Main
1933–34	No competition
1934–35	No competition
1935–36	No competition
1936–37	No competition
1937–38	No competition
1938–39	Harworth Colliery
1939–40	Harworth Colliery
1940–41	Harworth Colliery
1941–42	
1942–43	
1943–44	
1944–45	
1945–46	
1946–47	Edlington Rangers
1947–48	Rossington Colliery

Season	Division One	Division Two
1948–49	Highfields	Dinnington
1949–50	Highfields	Harworth Colliery Institute
1950–51	Dunscroft Welfare	Stainforth Democratic
1951–52	Briggs Social	Tickhill
1952–53	Armthorpe Welfare	
1953–54	Armthorpe Welfare	Bentley Colliery reserves
1954–55	Armthorpe Welfare	
1955–56	Askern Welfare	Adwick
1956–57	Armthorpe Welfare	Frickley Welfare
1957–58	Armthorpe Welfare	Bullcroft

Season	Division One	Division Two	Division Three
1958–59	Adwick WMC	Tom Hill OB	Houghton Main
1959–60	Adwick WMC	Houghton Main	Cortonwood MW
1960–61	Armthorpe Welfare	Cortonwood MW	Mitchell & Darfield
1961–62	Armthorpe Welfare	British Ropes	Clay Lane Social
1962–63	Adwick WMC	Clay Lane Social	Langold United
1963–64	Maltby Main	Dinnington Athletic	High Terrace
1964–65	Armthorpe Welfare	Langold United	Wheatley H OB
1965–66	Langold United	Goldthorpe Colliery	Bentley Victoria
1966–67	Askern Welfare	Bentley Victoria	Unbrako Steel

Season	Premier Division	Division One	Division Two	Division Three
1967–68	Houghton Main	Mexborough Main Street	Unbrako Steel	Northcliffe WMC
1968–69	South Kirkby Colliery	Bentley Victoria	Northcliffe	Edlington WMC
1969–70	British Ropes	Northcliffe	Edlington WMC	Cortonwood MW
1970–71	Redfearn National Glass	Upton	Goldthorpe Miners Welfare	Hyde Park WMC
1971–72	Redfearn National Glass	Edlington WMC	Carcroft WMC	Denaby St Albans
1972–73	Houghton Main	Northcliffe	Yorkshire Main	Mexborough MW
1973–74	Houghton Main	Moorends Athletic	Conisbrough	Hemsworth West End
1974–75	Houghton Main	Scawthorpe Social	Hemsworth West End	Upton United
1975–76	Houghton Main	Carcroft WMC	South Elmsall Pretoria	Kinsley Boys
1976–77	Edlington WMC	Grimethorpe Miners Welfare	Kinsley Boys	Dearne Community
1977–78	Grimethorpe Miners Welfare	Denaby St Albans	Hickleton Miners Welfare	Armthorpe Welfare
1978–79	Grimethorpe Miners Welfare	Hickleton Main	Brodsworth Miners Welfare	Whisper
1979–80	Edlington WMC	Northgate WMC	Whisper	Bridon
1980–81	Mexborough Main Street	Brookside	Plant Works	Yorkshire Main
1981–82	Houghton Main	Armthorpe Welfare	Armthorpe Welfare reserves	Hemsworth St Patricks
1982–83	Armthorpe Welfare	Pretoria WMC	Hemsworth St Patricks	Groves Social
1983–84	Houghton Main	Brodsworth Welfare	Hemsworth Town	Upton Brookside
1984–85	Brodsworth Miners Welfare	Northgate WMC	Toll Bar Central	Hemsworth Blue Bell
1985–86	Bridon	Kinsley Boys	Clay Lane Social	Kilnhurst Colliery
1986–87	Northgate WMC	Hemsworth Town	Langold Old Boys	Bentley Colliery
1987–88	Kinsley Boys	Toll Bar Central	Bentley Colliery	Scawthorpe Social
1988–89	Thorne Colliery	Skellow Grange	South Kirkby Colliery reserves	Hyde Park WMC

Season	Premier Division	Division One	Division Two
1989–90	Thorne Colliery	South Kirkby Colliery	Cantley Hawthorn
1990–91	Thorne Colliery	Hyde Park WMC	Bentley WMC
1991–92	Thorne Colliery	Bingham Sports	Sutton Rovers
1992–93	Thorne Colliery	Peglers	Hatfield Main reserves
1993–94	Kinsley Boys	Brookside WMC	Upton & Harewood Social
1994–95	Kinsley Boys	Sutton Rovers	Yorkshire Main reserves
1995–96	South Kirkby Colliery	Ackworth United	Edlington British Legion
1996–97	South Kirkby Colliery	Highfields MW	South Kirkby Colliery reserves

Season	Premier Division	Division One
1997–98	South Kirkby Colliery	Stainforth Central
1998–99	Sutton Rovers	Hemsworth St Patrick reserves
1999–00	Sutton Rovers	Rossington Main reserves
2000–01	Bentley Colliery	Moorland
2001–02	Edlington WMC	Hatfield Bluebell
2002–03	Hemsworth St Patrick	Moorland
2003–04	Armthorpe	Thorne Red Bear
2004–05	Hatfield Main	Swinton Station
2005–06	Hemsworth St Patrick	Tickhill Athletic
2006–07	Kinsley Boys	Maltby Sheppey
2007–08	Hemsworth Alpha	Swinton Station
2008–09	Upton & Harewood Social	Moorland
2009–10	Edlington Town	Maltby MW JFC
2010–11	AFC Sportsman Rovers	Carcroft Village
2011–12	Sutton Rovers	Denaby United
2012–13	Denaby United	Denaby Main
2013–14	Denaby United	Swinton Athletic reserves
2014–15	Sutton Rovers	Dunscroft United
2015–16	FC Graceholme	Askern reserves
2016–17	Sutton Rovers	Yorkshire Main
2017–18	Sutton Rovers	Bawtry Town
2018–19	White Swan Balby	Brodsworth Main
2019–20	Season suspended owing to COVID-19 pandemic	
2020–21	Askern Miners	Maltby Juniors
2021–22	Rossington Main reserves	Bentley Village
2022–23	Bentley Village	Upton United Juniors
2023–24	Bentley Village	AFC Bentley reserves
2024–25	Rossington	
