= Immingham Town F.C. =

Association football club in England

Immingham Town
- Full name: Immingham Town Football Club
- Nickname: The Pilgrims
- Short name: Ming Town
- Founded: 2016
- Ground: Blossom Way Sports & Social Club, Immingham
- Capacity: 1,000
- Chairman: Lee Mullen
- Manager: Vacant
- League: Northern Counties East League Division One
- 2025–26: Lincolnshire League Premier Division, 1st of 14 (promoted)
- Website: www.imminghamtownfc.co.uk
Home colours	Away colours

Immingham Town F.C. is an English football club based in Immingham, Lincolnshire. The senior team plays in the Northern Counties East League Division One and is managed by Jon Davy with Andy Mundell as his assistant and Mario Augusta coaches. The reserve squad is run by Simon Pinchbeck. The under 18s are managed by Mario Augusta and Mark Davies.

== History ==
Immingham Town FC reformed in 2016, 21 years after the old club was dissolved. The previous team had been in existence since 1912 until its dissolution in 1995. The club had participated in the Northern Counties East League, the FA Cup and the FA Vase.

== Honours ==
- Lincolnshire League
  - Supplementary Cup winners 2016/17
  - Challenge Cup winners 2017/18
- East Lincolnshire Combination
  - Junior Challenge Cup winners 2018/19

== Stadium ==
The club's home ground is Blossom Way Sports & Social Club Immingham.
