= Bentley Victoria Welfare F.C. =

Bentley Victoria Welfare
- Full name: Bentley Victoria Welfare Football Club
- Founded: (as Bentley Victoria)

Bentley Victoria Welfare F.C. was an English football club based in Bentley, Doncaster, South Yorkshire.

== History ==
The club, formed as Bentley Victoria, was created after the dissolution of the previous senior team in the village, Bentley Colliery. They initially competed in the Doncaster & District Senior League before moving into the Yorkshire League in 1973. They won promotion from Division Three in their debut campaign before changing name to Bentley Victoria Welfare. They were relegated back to Division Three in 1976 but won promotion back at the first time of asking by winning the Third Division title, and in 1978 they won their second successive promotion to reach the Yorkshire League's top flight.

They were relegated back to Division Two in their first season but again bounced back to reach Division One again in 1980. They spent two further years in Division One before the Yorkshire League merged with the Midland League to form the Northern Counties East League. The club was placed in the Premier Division of the new competition's inaugural campaign, and they stayed in the division for five years.

Throughout the 1970s and 1980s the club had competed in the FA Vase, reaching the 4th round in 1979.

At the end of the 1986–87 season the club left the NCEL and disbanded, paving the way for the reformed Bentley Colliery to later re-take their place as the senior team in the village.

=== Notable former players ===
Players that have played in the Football League either before or after playing for Bentley Victoria Welfare –

- Paul Showler
- Paul Edmunds
- Jimmy Mann
- Rod Belfitt
- Mick Bates

== Honours ==
=== League ===
- Yorkshire League Division Two
  - Promoted: 1977–78, 1979–80
- Yorkshire League Division Three
  - Promoted: 1973–74, 1976–77 (champions)

=== Cup ===
None

== Records ==
- Best FA Vase performance: 4th Round, 1978–79
