= Grimethorpe Miners Welfare F.C. =

Grimethorpe Miners Welfare
- Full name: Grimethorpe Miners Welfare Football Club
- Founded: {as Grimethorpe Rovers)

Grimethorpe Miners Welfare F.C. was an English association football club based in Grimethorpe, South Yorkshire.

== History ==
The club was formed as Grimethorpe Rovers prior to the outbreak of the Second World War, and after the end of hostilities changed name to Grimethorpe Athletic. In 1959 (a year after changing name again – to Grimethorpe Miners Welfare), the club joined the Yorkshire League, winning the Division Two title (and with it promotion) at the first attempt, and also the prestigious Sheffield & Hallamshire Senior Cup by beating Denaby United in the final. They spent three years in the top flight before being relegated back to Division Two in 1963. Two years later the club resigned from the league and returned to local football.

By the mid-1970s Grimethorpe were playing in the Doncaster & District Senior League, winning the Division One title in 1977 before winning back-to-back Premier Division titles in 1978 and 1979. In 1980 they rejoined the Yorkshire League, entering Division 3 and winning promotion at the first attempt. In 1982 the Yorkshire League merged with the Midland League to form the Northern Counties East League (NCEL), and Grimethorpe were among the founder members of the new competition.

They entered the FA Vase for the first time in 1982, and won back-to-back promotions in the mid-1980s (despite finishing 7th and 12th) to reach the NCEL's Premier Division. They were relegated back to Division One after three years, but resigned from the league part way through the 1990–91 season. In 1993 they joined the Sheffield & Hallamshire County Senior League (S&HCSL), winning two successive promotions to reach the Premier Division by 1995. After finishing 3rd in the S&HCSL's top flight, they joined the Central Midlands League (CMFL), winning promotion in their debut season to reach the CMFL Supreme Division.

After four years in the CMFL, they resigned and seemingly disbanded again. In 2002 the club was reformed in the S&HCSL, but would only last a further year before dissolving for good.

=== League and cup history ===
Grimethorpe Miners Welfare League and Cup history
Season	Division	Position	FA Vase
1959–60	Yorkshire League Division 2	1st/15	-
1960–61	Yorkshire League Division 1	5th/18	-
1961–62	Yorkshire League Division 1	13th/16	-
1962–63	Yorkshire League Division 1	16th/16	-
1963–64	Yorkshire League Division 2	10th/15	-
1964–65	Yorkshire League Division 2	11th/15	-
1976–77	Doncaster & District Senior League Division 1	1st	-
1977–78	Doncaster & District Senior League Premier Division	1st	-
1978–79	Doncaster & District Senior League Premier Division	1st	-
1980–81	Yorkshire League Division 3	4th/16	-
1981–82	Yorkshire League Division 2	12th/16	-
1982–83	Northern Counties East League Division 2 North	6th/14	3rd Round
1983–84	Northern Counties East League Division 2 North	9th/14	Preliminary Round
1984–85	Northern Counties East League Division 1 Central	10th/16	Preliminary Round
1985–86	Northern Counties East League Division 2	7th/16	Preliminary Round
1986–87	Northern Counties East League Division 1	12th/18	1st Round
1987–88	Northern Counties East League Premier Division	9th/17	Preliminary Round
1988–89	Northern Counties East League Premier Division	15th/17	Preliminary Round
1989–90	Northern Counties East League Premier Division	17th/18	Preliminary Round
1990–91	Northern Counties East League Division 1	Withdrew	Extra Preliminary Round
1993–94	Sheffield & Hallamshire County Senior League Division 2	1st/14	-
1994–95	Sheffield & Hallamshire County Senior League Division 1	1st/14	-
1995–96	Sheffield & Hallamshire County Senior League Premier Division	3rd/14	-
1996–97	Central Midlands League Premier Division	2nd/18	-
1997–98	Central Midlands League Supreme Division	12th/16	2nd Qualifying Round
1998–99	Central Midlands League Supreme Division	18th/19	2nd Qualifying Round
1999–00	Central Midlands League Supreme Division	12th/19	-
2002–03	Sheffield & Hallamshire County Senior League Division 2	7th/14	-

== Honours ==
=== League ===
- Yorkshire League Division Two
  - Promoted: 1959–60 (champions)
- Yorkshire League Division Three
  - Promoted: 1980–81
- Northern Counties East League Division One
  - Promoted: 1986–87
- Northern Counties East League Division Two
  - Promoted: 1985–86
- Central Midlands League Premier Division
  - Promoted: 1996–97
- Sheffield & Hallamshire County Senior League Division Two
  - Promoted: 1993–94 (champions)
- Sheffield & Hallamshire County Senior League Division One
  - Promoted: 1994–95 (champions)
- Doncaster & District Senior League Premier Division
  - Champions: 1977–78, 1978–79
- Doncaster & District Senior League Division One
  - Promoted: 1976–77 (champions)

=== Cup ===
- Sheffield & Hallamshire Senior Cup
  - Winners: 1959–60
  - Runners-up: 1995–96

== Records ==
- Best FA Vase performance: 3rd Round, 1982–83
