= Pilkington Recreation F.C. =

English association football club

Pilkington Recreation
- Full name: Pilkington Recreation Football Club

Pilkington Recreation F.C. was an English association football club based in Kirk Sandall, Doncaster, South Yorkshire.

== History ==
Little is known of the club's early years – they first came to the public eye when they played in the FA Cup in 1927, entering the competition every year up to the outbreak of the Second World War. After the war, they joined the Sheffield Association League for two years while again playing in the FA Cup, but it is not known what happened to the club between 1952 and 1976.

In 1976 they entered the Yorkshire League – a year later they first entered the FA Vase. In 1982 they joined the newly formed Northern Counties East League, but their spell in this competition was troubled, and in 1991 they resigned from the league and disbanded after finishing bottom of the basement division for the second successive season.

=== League and cup history ===
Pilkington Recreation League and Cup history
Season	Division	Position	FA Cup	FA Amateur Cup	FA Vase
1927–28			Preliminary round	3rd qualifying round	-
1928–29	Doncaster & District Senior League	1st	1st qualifying round	1st round	-
1929–30	Doncaster & District Senior League	1st	2nd qualifying round	1st round	-
1930–31			1st qualifying round	3rd qualifying round	-
1931–32	Doncaster & District Senior League	1st	Preliminary round	3rd qualifying round	-
1932–33			1st qualifying round	-	-
1933–34			1st qualifying round	-	-
1934–35			Extra preliminary round	-	-
1935–36			Preliminary round	-	-
1936–37			Extra preliminary round	-	-
1937–38			Preliminary round	-	-
1938–39			Extra preliminary round	-	-
1947–48	Sheffield Association League	/20	Extra preliminary round	-	-
1948–49	Sheffield Association League	/18	Preliminary round	-	-
1949–50			Preliminary round	-	-
1950–51			Extra preliminary round	-	-
1951–52			1st qualifying round	-	-
1956–57			-	Extra preliminary round	-
1957–58			-	Extra preliminary round	-
1976–77	Yorkshire League Division 3	16th/16	-	-	-
1977–78	Yorkshire League Division 3	9th/16	-	-	1st round
1978–79	Yorkshire League Division 3	10th/15	-	-	Preliminary Round
1979–80	Yorkshire League Division 3	4th/14	-	-	-
1980–81	Yorkshire League Division 2	6th/16	-	-	-
1981–82	Yorkshire League Division 2	13th/16	-	-	-
1982–83	Northern Counties East League Division 2 North	5th/14	-	-	3rd Round
1983–84	Northern Counties East League Division 2 North	12th/14	-	-	Preliminary Round
1984–85	Northern Counties East League Division 1 Central	6th/16	-	-	1st round
1985–86	Northern Counties East League Division 1	16th/16	-	-	Preliminary Round
1986–87	Northern Counties East League Division 1	10th/18	-	-	Preliminary Round
1987–88	Northern Counties East League Division 1	13th/16	-	-	-
1988–89	Northern Counties East League Division 1	16th/16	-	-	-
1989–90	Northern Counties East League Division 2	14th/14	-	-	-
1990–91	Northern Counties East League Division 2	13th/13	-	-	-

== Honours ==
=== League ===
- Yorkshire League Division Three
  - Promoted: 1979–80

=== Cup ===
None

== Records ==
- Best FA Cup performance: 2nd qualifying round, 1929–30
- Best FA Amateur Cup performance: 1st round, 1928–29, 1929–30
- Best FA Vase performance: 3rd Round, 1982–83
