= Hatfield Main F.C. =

Coordinates: 53°34′31.03″N 1°01′04.72″W

Hatfield Main
- Full name: Hatfield Main Football Club
- Founded: 1913
- Ground: Welfare Ground
- League: Doncaster Saturday League Premier Division
- 2021–22: Doncaster Saturday League Premier Division, 7th of 12
Home colours

Hatfield Main Football Club was a football club originally based in Stainforth and then Dunscroft, South Yorkshire, England. They were members of the Doncaster Saturday League Premier Division.

== History ==
The club was formed in 1913, entering the FA Cup for the first time in 1929. They spent their early years in local Doncaster leagues. In 1955 they joined Division Two of the Yorkshire League. After finishing fourth in 1961–62 they were promoted to Division One, but were relegated at the end of the following season. In 1963–64 they finished second in Division Two and were promoted again, and remained in Division One until being relegated at the end of the 1969–70 season. In 1972–73 they were promoted back to Division One, but were relegated back to Division Two at the end of the 1976–77 season.

When the Yorkshire League merged into the Northern Counties East League (NCEL) in 1982, Hatfield Main were placed in Division One North. Two seasons later they were transferred to Division One Central, and in 1985–86 were placed in Division One. After finishing third in 1986–87 they were promoted to the Premier Division. They finished as runners-up in 1988–89, but the following season they finished bottom and were relegated. In 1994–95 they won Division One and were promoted back to the Premier Division. The following season they won the Premier Division title, however they were denied promotion to the Northern Premier League due to ground grading issues, which resulted in the manager and most of the team leaving. In 1998 they finished bottom of the Premier Division and were relegated.

In 2003 they pulled out of the NCEL and rejoined the Doncaster & District Senior League (D&DSL). They won the Division One title in 2004 and won promotion to the Premier Division, and in 2005 they joined the Central Midlands League (CMFL). Hatfield spent five years in the CMFL, in which time they won promotion to the Supreme Division, but in 2010 they again rejoined the Doncaster Senior League.

After two further years in the D&DSL the club resigned, and disbanded after 99 years of existence. However, the club were reformed for 1 season in 2021–22 season, entering the Doncaster League.

=== League and cup history ===
Hatfield Main League and Cup history
Season	Division	Position	FA Cup	FA Trophy	FA Vase
1929–30			Preliminary round	-	-
1930–31			2nd qualifying round	-	-
1931–32			1st qualifying round	-	-
1932–33			Preliminary round	-	-
1955–56	Yorkshire League Division 2	15th/16	-	-	-
1956–57	Yorkshire League Division 2	15th/17	-	-	-
1957–58	Yorkshire League Division 2	11th/14	-	-	-
1958–59	Yorkshire League Division 2	13th/13	-	-	-
1959–60	Yorkshire League Division 2	12th/15	-	-	-
1960–61	Yorkshire League Division 2	8th/19	-	-	-
1961–62	Yorkshire League Division 2	4th/14	-	-	-
1962–63	Yorkshire League Division 1	13th/16	-	-	-
1963–64	Yorkshire League Division 2	2nd/15	-	-	-
1964–65	Yorkshire League Division 1	4th/16	-	-	-
1965–66	Yorkshire League Division 1	2nd/16	-	-	-
1966–67	Yorkshire League Division 1	5th/17	-	-	-
1967–68	Yorkshire League Division 1	4th/17	-	-	-
1968–69	Yorkshire League Division 1	11th/18	2nd qualifying round	-	-
1969–70	Yorkshire League Division 1	16th/18	-	-	-
1970–71	Yorkshire League Division 2	16th/18	-	-	-
1971–72	Yorkshire League Division 2	7th/15	-	-	-
1972–73	Yorkshire League Division 2	4th/16	2nd qualifying round	1st qualifying round	-
1973–74	Yorkshire League Division 1	7th/16	Preliminary round	2nd qualifying round	-
1974–75	Yorkshire League Division 1	11th/16	-	1st qualifying round	-
1975–76	Yorkshire League Division 1	7th/16	-	2nd qualifying round	-
1976–77	Yorkshire League Division 1	15th/16	-	Preliminary round	-
1977–78	Yorkshire League Division 2	11th/15	-	-	1st round
1978–79	Yorkshire League Division 2	7th/16	-	-	Preliminary Round
1979–80	Yorkshire League Division 2	5th/16	-	-	1st round
1980–81	Yorkshire League Division 2	14th/16	-	-	Preliminary Round
1981–82	Yorkshire League Division 2	8th/15	-	-	1st round
1982–83	Northern Counties East League Division 1 North	11th/14	-	-	Preliminary Round
1983–84	Northern Counties East League Division 1 North	12th/14	-	-	4th Round
1984–85	Northern Counties East League Division 1 Central	5th/16	-	-	1st round
1985–86	Northern Counties East League Division 1	11th/16	-	-	Preliminary Round
1986–87	Northern Counties East League Division 1	3rd/18	-	-	Preliminary Round
1987–88	Northern Counties East League Premier Division	11th/17	-	-	4th Round
1988–89	Northern Counties East League Premier Division	2nd/17	-	-	2nd round
1989–90	Northern Counties East League Premier Division	18th/18	-	-	1st round
1990–91	Northern Counties East League Division 1	8th/13	-	-	Preliminary Round
1991–92	Northern Counties East League Division 1	16th/16	-	-	-
1992–93	Northern Counties East League Division 1	11th/14	-	-	Preliminary Round
1993–94	Northern Counties East League Division 1	4th/15	-	-	Preliminary Round
1994–95	Northern Counties East League Division 1	1st/16	Preliminary round	-	3rd Round
1995–96	Northern Counties East League Premier Division	1st/20	1st qualifying round	-	1st round
1996–97	Northern Counties East League Premier Division	17th/20	Preliminary round	-	1st round
1997–98	Northern Counties East League Premier Division	20th/20	Preliminary round	-	1st round
1998–99	Northern Counties East League Division 1	8th/13	-	-	-
1999–00	Northern Counties East League Division 1	16th/16	-	-	2nd qualifying round
2000–01	Northern Counties East League Division 1	8th/16	Preliminary round	-	2nd qualifying round
2001–02	Northern Counties East League Division 1	10th/17	Preliminary round	-	1st round
2002–03	Northern Counties East League Division 1	5th/17	Preliminary round	-	1st qualifying round
2003–04	Doncaster & District Senior League Division 1	4th/13	-	-	-
2004–05	Doncaster & District Senior League Premier Division	1st/14	-	-	-
2005–06	Central Midlands League Premier Division	16th/20	-	-	-
2006–07	Central Midlands League Premier Division	1st/19	-	-	-
2007–08	Central Midlands League Supreme Division	10th/20	-	-	-
2008–09	Central Midlands League Supreme Division	13th/18	-	-	-
2009–10	Central Midlands League Supreme Division	Withdrew	-	-	-
2010–11	Doncaster & District Senior League Division 1	3rd/15	-	-	-
2011–12	Doncaster & District Senior League Premier Division	4th/14	-	-	-

== Honours ==
=== League ===
- Yorkshire League Division One
  - Runners-up: 1965–66
- Yorkshire League Division Two
  - Promoted: 1961–62, 1963–64, 1972–73
- Northern Counties East League Premier Division
  - Champions: 1995–96
- Northern Counties East League Division One
  - Promoted: 1986–87, 1994–95 (champions)
- Central Midlands League Premier Division
  - Promoted: 2006–07 (champions)
- Doncaster & District Senior League Champions 1933
- Division One *Promoted: 2003–04, 2010–11

=== Cup ===
- West Riding County Cup
  - Winners: 1961–62, 1963–64

Yorkshire League Cup Runners Up 1972/3

== Records ==
- Best FA Cup performance: 2nd qualifying round, 1930–31, 1968–69, 1972–73
- Best FA Trophy performance: 2nd qualifying round, 1973–74, 1975–76
- Best FA Vase performance: 4th Round, 1983–84, 1987–88
