= List of Buxton F.C. seasons =

Buxton Football Club is a football club based in Buxton, Derbyshire, England. They are currently members of the National League North and play at the Silverlands.

== Early history ==
The club was established in autumn 1877 as an offshoot of the local cricket club, playing their first match on 27 October 1877. In 1891 they joined the Combination. They finished bottom of the league in 1895–96 and left at the end of the 1898–99 season, when they switched to the Manchester League. They were runners-up in 1904–05 but spent most of the next seven seasons in lower mid-table, finishing second-from-bottom on three occasions, before the league was disbanded in 1912.

Buxton rejoined the Manchester League when it was re-established in 1920, and considered applying to join the new Football League Third Division North when it was formed in 1921, although they did not submit a bid. They were Manchester League runners-up in 1928–29 and 1929–30 and League Cup winners in 1925–26 and 1926–27. After winning the league in 1931–32, they joined the Cheshire County League.

== Key ==
Key to league record

- Level = Level of the league in the current league system
- Pld = Games played
- W = Games won
- D = Games drawn
- L = Games lost
- GF = Goals for
- GA = Goals against
- GD = Goals difference
- Pts = Points
- Position = Position in the final league table
- Top scorer and number of goals scored shown in bold when he was also top scorer for the division.

Key to cup records

- Res = Final reached round
- Rec = Final club record in the form of wins-draws-losses
- PR = Preliminary round
- QR1 (2, etc.) = Qualifying Cup rounds
- G = Group stage
- R1 (2, etc.) = Proper Cup rounds
- QF = Quarter-finalists
- SF = Semi-finalists
- F = Finalists
- A(QF,SF,F) = Area quarter-, semi-, finalists
- W = Winners

== Seasons ==
Year	League														Cup competitions						Manager
Year	Division	Lvl	Pld	W	D	L	GF	GA	GD	Pts	Position	Leading league scorer		Average attendance	FA Cup		FA Trophy		FA Vase		Manager
Year	Division	Lvl	Pld	W	D	L	GF	GA	GD	Pts	Position	Name	Goals	Average attendance	Res	Rec	Res	Rec	Res	Rec	Manager
1932–33	**Cheshire County League**		42	16	5	21	81	92	-11	37	**16th of 22**										
1933–34	**Cheshire County League**		42	14	11	17	81	95	-14	39	**15th of 22**										
1934–35	**Cheshire County League**		42	19	5	18	95	95	0	43	**9th of 22**										
1935–36	**Cheshire County League**		42	18	7	17	95	90	+5	43	**11th of 22**										
1936–37	**Cheshire County League**		42	22	6	14	107	89	+18	50	**6th of 22**										
1937–38	**Cheshire County League**		42	14	5	23	87	108	-21	33	**18th of 22**										
1938–39	**Cheshire County League**		42	12	11	19	71	93	-22	35	**16th of 22**										
No competitive football was played between 1939 and 1946 due to the World War II.
1945–46	**Cheshire County League**		38	21	8	9	131	72	+59	50	**3rd of 20**										
1946–47	**Cheshire County League**		42	24	8	10	117	79	+38	56	**2nd of 22**				PR	1–1–0					
1947–48	**Cheshire County League**		42	13	6	23	89	113	-24	32	**19th of 22**				QR2	2–0–1					
1948–49	**Cheshire County League**		42	15	6	21	77	104	-27	36	**17th of 22**				QR1	1–0–1					
1949–50	**Cheshire County League**		42	11	16	15	78	88	-10	38	**13th of 22**				QR2	3–0–1					
1950–51	**Cheshire County League**		42	14	9	19	55	69	-14	37	**15th of 22**				PR	0–0–1					
1951–52	**Cheshire County League**		42	10	11	21	73	84	-11	31	**19th of 22**				R3	7–2–1					
1952–53	**Cheshire County League**		42	17	10	15	76	81	-5	44	**9th of 22**				QR4	0–0–1					
1953–54	**Cheshire County League**		42	10	7	25	58	98	-40	27	**22nd of 22**				QR4	0–0–1					
1954–55	**Cheshire County League**		42	7	10	25	59	124	-65	24	**22nd of 22**				QR1	0–0–1					
1955–56	**Cheshire County League**		42	19	6	17	94	78	+16	44	**11th of 22**				QR2	1–0–1					
1956–57	**Cheshire County League**		42	19	7	16	94	78	+16	45	**9th of 22**				QR1	0–0–1					
1957–58	**Cheshire County League**		42	20	9	13	86	66	+20	49	**7th of 22**				QR1	0–0–1					
1958–59	**Cheshire County League**		38	16	8	14	87	71	+16	40	**9th of 20**				R2	5–1–1					
1959–60	**Cheshire County League**		38	21	7	10	85	56	+29	49	**4th of 20**				QR2	1–0–1					
1960–61	**Cheshire County League**		42	21	7	14	96	76	+20	49	**8th of 22**				QR1	0–0–1					
1961–62	**Cheshire County League**		42	21	6	15	98	79	+19	48	**7th of 22**				QR2	1–1–1					
1962–63	**Cheshire County League**		42	24	7	11	104	71	+33	55	**2nd of 22**				R1	4–2–1					
1963–64	**Cheshire County League**		42	18	11	13	92	77	+15	47	**9th of 22**				QR1	0–1–1					
1964–65	**Cheshire County League**		42	15	7	20	77	99	-22	37	**15th of 22**				QR1	0–0–1					
1965–66	**Cheshire County League**		42	15	8	19	74	82	-8	38	**12th of 22**				QR2	1–1–1					
1966–67	**Cheshire County League**		42	13	10	19	69	78	-9	36	**16th of 22**				QR1	0–0–1					
1967–68	**Cheshire County League**		42	14	8	20	71	86	-15	36	**15th of 22**				QR1	0–0–1					
1968–69	**Cheshire County League**		38	16	8	14	71	53	+18	40	**8th of 20**				QR3	2–0–1					
1969–70	**Cheshire County League**		38	19	8	11	64	59	+5	46	**5th of 20**				PR	0–0–1	R2	2–2–1			
1970–71	**Cheshire County League**		42	18	8	16	69	72	-3	44	**8th of 22**				PR	0–0–1	QF	3–1–1			
1971–72	**Cheshire County League**		42	21	12	9	81	47	+34	54	**4th of 22**				QR1	0–1–1	QF	3–2–1			
1972–73	**Cheshire County League**		42	28	8	6	89	32	+57	66	**1st of 22**				QR1	0–1–1	R3	2–0–1			
1973–74	**Northern Premier League**	5	46	14	10	22	45	71	-26	38	**18th of 24**				QR4	3-1-1	R3	2-0-1	—		
1974–75	**Northern Premier League**	5	46	11	17	18	50	77	-27	39	**16th of 24**				QR1	0-0-1	R1	0-1-1	—		
1975–76	**Northern Premier League**	5	46	11	13	22	37	62	-25	35	**17th of 24**				QR1	1-0-1	R1	0-1-1	—		
1976–77	**Northern Premier League**	5	44	11	13	20	48	63	-15	35	**18th of 23**				QR2	1-0-1	QR3	0-0-1	—		
1977–78	**Northern Premier League**	5	46	13	6	27	60	95	-35	32	**23rd of 24**				QR2	1-0-1	QR2	1-1-1	—		Peter Swan
1978–79	**Northern Premier League**	5	44	11	9	24	50	84	-34	31	**22nd of 23**				QR3	2-1-1	QR3	2-2-1	—		Colin Whitaker
1978–79	**Northern Premier League**	5	Level of the league decreased after the Alliance Premier League creation.												QR3	2-1-1	QR3	2-2-1	—		Colin Whitaker
1979–80	**Northern Premier League**	6	42	21	9	12	61	48	+13	51	**6th of 22**				QR2	1-3-1	QR1	0-1-1	—		Colin Whitaker
1980–81	**Northern Premier League**	6	42	21	7	14	64	50	+14	49	**4th of 22**				PR	0-0-1	QR2	1-0-1	—		Colin Whitaker
1981–82	**Northern Premier League**	6	38	12	15	11	57	50	+7	39	**8th of 20**				QR4	4-1-1	R1	3-0-1	—		Colin Whitaker
1982–83	**Northern Premier League**	6	38	14	8	16	46	47	-1	36	**12th of 20**				QR1	0-0-1	QR1	0-0-1	—		
1983–84	**Northern Premier League**	6	38	21	5	12	74	51	+23	47	**5th of 20**				QR2	1-0-1	QR1	0-2-1	—		
1984–85	**Northern Premier League**	6	38	21	6	11	85	60	+25	48	**6th of 20**				QR1	0-1-1	QR2	2-3-0	—		
1985–86	**Northern Premier League**	6	38	18	9	11	52	50	+2	45	**8th of 20**				QR2	1-1-1	QR2	1-0-1	—		
1986–87	**Northern Premier League**	6	38	4	12	22	35	78	-43	20	**19th of 20**				QR2	0-1-1	QR1	0-0-1	—		
Northern Premier League added a new Division One.
1987–88	**Northern Premier League**; **Premier Division**	6	42	11	14	17	72	76	-4	47	**16th of 22**				QR2	1-1-1	R1	3-0-1	—		
1988–89	**Northern Premier League**; **Premier Division**	6	42	12	14	16	61	63	-2	50	**15th of 22**				QR2	1-0-1	R1	3-0-1	—		
1989–90	**Northern Premier League**; **Premier Division**	6	42	15	8	19	59	72	-13	53	**16th of 22**				QR3	2-3-1	QR3	0-1-1	—		
1990–91	**Northern Premier League**; **Premier Division**	6	40	17	11	12	66	61	+5	59 (Note: The club was deducted three points.)	**8th of 21**				QR2	1-0-1	QR1	0-0-1	—		
1991–92	**Northern Premier League**; **Premier Division**	6	42	21	9	12	65	47	+18	72	**5th of 22**				QR2	1-0-1	QR2	1-0-1	—		
1992–93	**Northern Premier League**; **Premier Division**	6	42	13	10	19	60	75	-15	49	**14th of 22**				QR1	0-1-1	QR2	0-1-1	—		
1993–94	**Northern Premier League**; **Premier Division**	6	42	13	10	19	67	73	-6	49	**15th of 22**				QR3	2-0-1	QR2	1-1-1	—		
1994–95	**Northern Premier League**; **Premier Division**	6	42	18	9	15	65	62	+3	63	**7th of 22**				QR1	0-0-1	QR1	0-0-1	—		
1995–96	**Northern Premier League**; **Premier Division**	6	42	9	11	22	43	72	-29	38	**20th of 22**				QR1	0-0-1	QR3	0-0-1	—		
1996–97	**Northern Premier League**; **Premier Division**	6	44	5	12	27	33	86	-53	27	**23rd of 23**				QR1	0-0-1	QR3	2-1-1	—		
1997–98	**Northern Premier League**; **Division One**	7	42	7	3	32	41	87	-46	24	**22nd of 22**				PR	0-0-1	QR1	0-0-1	—		Wayne Goodison
1998–99	**Northern Counties East**; **Football League**; **Premier Division**	8	38	14	10	14	54	53	+1	52	**10th of 20**				QR3	2-1-1	—		R2	0-0-1	Derek Hall
1999–2000	**Northern Counties East**; **Football League**; **Premier Division**	8	38	11	6	21	35	67	-32	36 (Note: The club was deducted three points.)	**18th of 20**				-	-	—		R1	0-0-1	? Mark Smith
2000–01	**Northern Counties East**; **Football League**; **Premier Division**	8	38	12	9	17	38	57	-19	45	**12th of 20**				PR	0-0-1	—		R1	1-0-1	Mark Smith
2001–02	**Northern Counties East**; **Football League**; **Premier Division**	8	38	8	13	17	43	61	-18	37	**19th of 20**				PR	0-0-1	—		R2	2-0-1	Mark Smith
2002–03	**Northern Counties East**; **Football League**; **Premier Division**	8	38	21	7	10	84	56	+28	70	**4th of 20**				PR	0-0-1	—		R1	1-0-1	Kenny Johnson & Ronnie Wright
2003–04	**Northern Counties East**; **Football League**; **Premier Division**	8	38	17	12	9	69	50	+19	63	**7th of 20**				QR4	4-2-1	—		R3	3-2-1	Kenny Johnson & Ronnie Wright
2003–04	**Northern Counties East**; **Football League**; **Premier Division**	8	Level of the league decreased after the Conference North and South creation.												QR4	4-2-1	—		R3	3-2-1	Kenny Johnson & Ronnie Wright
2004–05	**Northern Counties East**; **Football League**; **Premier Division**	9	38	14	13	11	59	57	+2	55	**9th of 20**				PR	0-2-0	—		R1	1-0-1	Kenny Johnson & Ronnie Wright; Nicky Law
2005–06	**Northern Counties East**; **Football League**; **Premier Division**	9	38	30	5	3	102	27	+75	95	**1st of 20**				PR	0-1-1	—		R5	6-0-1	Nicky Law
2006–07	**Northern Premier League**; **Division One**	8	46	30	11	5	94	37	+57	101	**1st of 24**			480	QR2	2-1-1	QR1	0-0-1	—		Nicky Law
2007–08	**Northern Premier League**; **Premier Division**	7	40	20	8	12	60	50	+10	68	**5th of 21**			461	QR2	1-0-1	QR3	2-0-1	—		John Reed
2007–08	**Northern Premier League**; **Premier Division**	7	Lost in the **play-off** final.												QR2	1-0-1	QR3	2-0-1	—		John Reed
2008–09	**Northern Premier League**; **Premier Division**	7	42	13	10	19	56	58	-2	49	**14th of 22**			442	QR3	2-0-1	QR2	1-0-1	—		John Reed
2009–10	**Northern Premier League**; **Premier Division**	7	38	16	12	10	66	43	+23	60	**8th of 20**			361	QR4	3-1-1	QR2	1-0-1	—		John Reed
2010–11	**Northern Premier League**; **Premier Division**	7	42	20	10	12	71	52	+19	70	**6th of 22**			409	QR4	2-2-1	QR1	0-0-1	—		John Reed
2011–12	**Northern Premier League**; **Premier Division**	7	42	15	8	19	64	77	-13	53	**13th of 22**			327	QR2	1-0-1	QR2	1-0-1	—		John Reed; Martin McIntosh
2012–13	**Northern Premier League**; **Premier Division**	7	42	18	13	11	72	56	+16	67	**7th of 22**			311	QR4	3-1-1	R1	3-1-1	—		Martin McIntosh
2013–14	**Northern Premier League**; **Premier Division**	7	46	16	14	16	63	60	+3	62	**13th of 24**			347	QR2	1-0-1	QR2	0-2-1	—		Martin McIntosh
2014–15	**Northern Premier League**; **Premier Division**	7	46	18	17	11	70	57	+13	71	**10th of 24**			315	QR3	2-0-1	QR2	1-0-1	—		Martin McIntosh
2015–16	**Northern Premier League**; **Premier Division**	7	46	21	4	21	71	74	-3	67	**11th of 24**			253	QR3	2-1-1	QR3	2-0-1	—		Martin McIntosh
2016–17	**Northern Premier League**; **Premier Division**	7	46	22	12	12	81	54	+27	78	**7th of 24**			355	QR1	0-0-1	QR3	1-0-1	—		Martin McIntosh
2017–18	**Northern Premier League**; **Premier Division**	7	46	17	13	16	71	66	+5	64	**9th of 24**	Liam Hardy	34	305	QR4	3-0-1	QR1	0-0-1	—		Martin McIntosh; Steve Halford & Paul Phillips
2018–19	**Northern Premier League**; **Premier Division**	7	40	18	10	12	60	45	+15	66	**5th of 21**	Liam Hardy	16	476	QR2	1-1-1	QR2	1-2-1	—		Steve Halford & Paul Phillips; Paul Phillips
2018–19	**Northern Premier League**; **Premier Division**	7	Lost in the **play-off** semifinal.												QR2	1-1-1	QR2	1-2-1	—		Steve Halford & Paul Phillips; Paul Phillips
2019–20	**Northern Premier League**; **Premier Division**	7	32	8	11	13	56	52	+4	35	18th of 22	Diego De Girolamo	18	443	QR3	2-0-1	QR2	1-0-1	—		Paul Phillips; Gary Hayward
2019–20	**Northern Premier League**; **Premier Division**	7	The season was declared null and void due to COVID-19.												QR3	2-0-1	QR2	1-0-1	—		Paul Phillips; Gary Hayward
2020–21	**Northern Premier League**; **Premier Division**	7	8	5	2	1	22	11	+11	17	3rd of 22	Diego De Girolamo	8	– (Note: COVID-19 prevented fans from attending games.)	QR2	1-1-0	R1	1-0-1	—		Gary Hayward
2020–21	**Northern Premier League**; **Premier Division**	7	The season was declared null and void due to COVID-19.												QR2	1-1-0	R1	1-0-1	—		Gary Hayward
2021–22	**Northern Premier League**; **Premier Division**	7	42	23	12	7	80	38	+42	81	**1st of 22**	Diego De Girolamo	20	737	R2	5–2–1	QR3	0–0–1	—		Gary Hayward; Steve Cunningham
2022–23	**National League North**	6	46	18	13	15	55	54	+1	67	**11th of 24**	Diego De Girolamo	9	717	R2	4–0–1	R2	0–0–1	—		Jamie Vermiglio; Craig Elliott
2023–24	**National League North**	6	46	17	11	18	70	63	+7	62	**14th of 24**	Diego De Girolamo	16	739	QR2	0–0–1	R2	0–0–1	—		Craig Elliott
2024–25	**National League North**	6	46	24	5	17	76	52	+24	77	**7th of 24**	Luke Brennan	11	783	QR3	1–2–1	R2	0–0–1	—		John McGrath
2024–25	**National League North**	6	Lost in the **play-off** quarterfinal.												QR3	1–2–1	R2	0–0–1	—		John McGrath
