= Armthorpe Welfare F.C. =

Association football club in Armthorpe, England

Coordinates: 53.534677°N 1.05645°W

Armthorpe Welfare
- Full name: Armthorpe Welfare Football Club
- Nickname: The Wellie
- Founded: 1926 (reformed 1976)
- Dissolved: 1974
- Ground: Welfare Ground, Armthorpe
- Capacity: 2,500 (250 seated)
- Chairman: Tony Walton
- Manager: Danny Charlotte & Lee Joynt
- League: Northern Counties East League Division One
- 2025–26: Northern Counties East League Division One, 7th of 22
Home colours

Armthorpe Welfare Football Club is a semi-professional football club based in Armthorpe, South Yorkshire, England. They are currently members of the Northern Counties East League Division One and play at the Welfare Ground.

== History ==
The club was established in 1926, and initially competed only in local leagues, including the Doncaster Red Triangle League. In 1935 they turned semi-professional and joined the Sheffield Association League. They first entered the FA Cup in the following season, and competed in the FA Amateur Cup for a few years after World War II. They left the Sheffield League in 1950 to join Division Two of the Doncaster & District Senior League. Their first season in the new league saw them promoted to Division One.

Although they were relegated two seasons later, Armthorpe won Division Two at the first attempt to earn promotion back to Division One. In just their second season in Division One they won the league title, and they would go on to win the title on a further four occasions in the next five years. They added further title wins in 1960–61, 1961–62 and 1964–65. However the club was relegated from the renamed Premier Division at the end of the 1966–67 season. They were relegated again in 1969–70, and sunk into Division Three after another relegation in 1972–73. In 1974 the club folded.

Two years later the club reformed and rejoined the Doncaster & District Senior League. They began in Division Three, which they won in 1978–79. The following season they won Division Two and the League Cup in 1979–80, and went on to retain the League Cup for the following two seasons. In 1981–82 they won the League Cup for a fourth consecutive season, as well as the West Riding Challenge Cup and the Division One title, earning promotion to the Premier Division. The following season saw them win four competitions; the Premier Division, the League Cup, the West Riding Challenge Cup and the Goole & Thorne FA Challenge Cup.

Following their Premier Division title, the club moved up Division Two North of the Northern Counties East League (NCEL). They finished as runners-up in their first season, earning promotion to Division One Central. They went on to win the division at the first attempt and were promoted to the Premier Division, where they have remained since, becoming the division's longest serving club. In 1987–88 the club finished as runners-up, losing the title to Emley on goal difference. In 2000–01 they finished in the relegation zone, but were reprieved from relegation after Ossett Albion were promoted to the Northern Premier League and no club was relegated in their place. Having remained in the Premier Division for a record 32 seasons, the club were relegated to Division One at the end of the 2016–17 season after finishing second-from-bottom of the table.

=== Season-by-season record ===
Season	Division	Level	Position	FA Cup	FA Amateur Cup	FA Vase	Notes
1934–35	Doncaster Red Triangle League	–		–	–	–	
1935–36	Sheffield Association League	–	3/12	–	–	–	
1936–37	Sheffield Association League	–	14/15	EPR	–	–	
1937–38	Sheffield Association League	–	8/17	PR	–	–	
1938–39	Sheffield Association League	–		EPR	–	–	
1939–40	Sheffield Association League	–		–	–	–	
1940–41	Sheffield Association League	–		–	–	–	
1947–48	Sheffield Association League	–		PR	–	–	
1948–49	Sheffield Association League	–		EPR	–	–	
1949–50	Sheffield Association League	–		EPR	–	–	
1950–51	Doncaster & District Senior League Division 2	–		EPR	–	–	Promoted
1951–52	Doncaster & District Senior League Division 1	–		–	–	–	
1952–53	Doncaster & District Senior League Division 1	–		–	–	–	Relegated
1953–54	Doncaster & District Senior League Division 2	–	1/12	–	–	–	Champions, promoted
1954–55	Doncaster & District Senior League Division 1	–	1/15	–	EPR	–	Champions
1955–56	Doncaster & District Senior League Division 1	–		–	3QR	–	
1956–57	Doncaster & District Senior League Division 1	–	1/14	–	PR	–	Champions
1957–58	Doncaster & District Senior League Division 1	–	1/16	–	4QR	–	Champions
1958–59	Doncaster & District Senior League Division 1	–	2/13	–	1QR	–	
1959–60	Doncaster & District Senior League Division 1	–	7/13	–	1QR	–	
1960–61	Doncaster & District Senior League Division 1	–	1/12	–	4QR	–	Champions
1961–62	Doncaster & District Senior League Division 1	–	1/12	–	–	–	Champions
1962–63	Doncaster & District Senior League Division 1	–		–	–	–	
1963–64	Doncaster & District Senior League Division 1	–	3/12	–	–	–	
1964–65	Doncaster & District Senior League Division 1	–	1/12	–	–	–	Champions
1965–66	Doncaster & District Senior League Division 1	–	3/12	–	–	–	
1966–67	Doncaster & District Senior League Premier Division	–	11/15	–	–	–	Relegated
1967–68	Doncaster & District Senior League Division 1	–	11/12	–	–	–	
1968–69	Doncaster & District Senior League Division 1	–		–	–	–	
1969–70	Doncaster & District Senior League Division 1	–		–	–	–	Relegated
1970–71	Doncaster & District Senior League Division 2	–		–	–	–	
1971–72	Doncaster & District Senior League Division 2	–		–	–	–	
1972–73	Doncaster & District Senior League Division 2	–		–	–	–	Relegated
1973–74	Doncaster & District Senior League Division 3	–		–	–	–	
1974–75	Doncaster & District Senior League Division 3	–		–	–	–	
1975–76	Club dissolved (1975) and reformed (1976)						
1976–77	Doncaster & District Senior League Division 3	–		–	–	–	
1977–78	Doncaster & District Senior League Division 3	–	1/14	–	–	–	Champions, promoted
1978–79	Doncaster & District Senior League Division 2	–		–	–	–	Promoted
1979–80	Doncaster & District Senior League Division 1	–		–	–	–	
1980–81	Doncaster & District Senior League Division 1	–	3/16	–	–	–	
1981–82	Doncaster & District Senior League Division 1	–	1/14	–	–	–	Champions, promoted
1982–83	Doncaster & District Senior League Premier Division	–	1/14	–	–	–	Champions, promoted
1983–84	Northern Counties East League Division 2 North	–	2/14	–	–	–	Promoted
1984–85	Northern Counties East League Division 1 Central	–	1/16	–	–	3R	Promoted
1985–86	Northern Counties East League Premier Division	–	13/20	1QR	–	1R	
1986–87	Northern Counties East League Premier Division	–	12/19	3QR	–	1R	
1987–88	Northern Counties East League Premier Division	–	2/17	PR	–	1R	
1988–89	Northern Counties East League Premier Division	–	11/17	1QR	–	PR	
1989–90	Northern Counties East League Premier Division	–	7/18	PR	–	PR	
1990–91	Northern Counties East League Premier Division	–	9/16	1QR	–	1R	
1991–92	Northern Counties East League Premier Division	–	13/19	2QR	–	1R	
1992–93	Northern Counties East League Premier Division	–	19/20	1QR	–	1R	
1993–94	Northern Counties East League Premier Division	–	10/20	PR	–	1R	
1994–95	Northern Counties East League Premier Division	–	8/20	PR	–	PR	
1995–96	Northern Counties East League Premier Division	–	11/20	PR	–	2QR	
1996–97	Northern Counties East League Premier Division	–	12/20	PR	–	2QR	
1997–98	Northern Counties East League Premier Division	–	9/20	PR	–	2R	
1998–99	Northern Counties East League Premier Division	–	13/20	1QR	–	2QR	
1999–00	Northern Counties East League Premier Division	–	11/20	1QR	–	1R	
2000–01	Northern Counties East League Premier Division	–	19/20	EPR	–	2QR	
2001–02	Northern Counties East League Premier Division	–	6/20	PR	–	1QR	
2002–03	Northern Counties East League Premier Division	–	18/20	EPR	–	1R	
2003–04	Northern Counties East League Premier Division	–	14/20	1QR	–	1QR	
2004–05	Northern Counties East League Premier Division	9	18/20	1QR	–	2QR	
2005–06	Northern Counties East League Premier Division	9	10/20	2QR	–	1R	
2006–07	Northern Counties East League Premier Division	9	13/20	1QR	–	1QR	
2007–08	Northern Counties East League Premier Division	9	9/20	EPR	–	1R	
2008–09	Northern Counties East League Premier Division	9	15/20	PR	–	2QR	
2009–10	Northern Counties East League Premier Division	9	3/20	EPR	–	4R	
2010–11	Northern Counties East League Premier Division	9	13/20	PR	–	2R	
2011–12	Northern Counties East League Premier Division	9	13/20	1QR	–	3R	
2012–13	Northern Counties East League Premier Division	9	20/22	EPR	–	2R	
2013–14	Northern Counties East League Premier Division	9	18/23	EPR	–	2R	
2014–15	Northern Counties East League Premier Division	9	17/21	PR	–	2QR	
2015–16	Northern Counties East League Premier Division	9	19/22	2QR	–	1R	
2016–17	Northern Counties East League Premier Division	9	21/22	EPR	–	1QR	Relegated
2017–18	Northern Counties East League Division One	10	16/22	EPR	–	2QR	
2018–19	Northern Counties East League Division One	10	17/20	–	–	1QR	
2019–20	Northern Counties East League Division One	10	–	–	–	1QR	Season abandoned due to COVID-19 pandemic
2020–21	Northern Counties East League Division One	10	–	–	–	1QR	Season abandoned due to COVID-19 pandemic
2021–22	Northern Counties East League Division One	10	13/21	–	–	1QR	
2022–23	Northern Counties East League Division One	10	8/20	–	–	1R	
2023–24	Northern Counties East League Division One	10	19/23	–	–	2QR	
2024–25	Northern Counties East League Division One	10	13/22	–	–	2QR	
2025–26	Northern Counties East League Division One	10	7/22	–	–	2QR	
Season	Division	Level	Position	FA Cup	FA Amateur Cup	FA Vase	Notes
Source: Football Club History Database

== Ground ==
The club plays at the Welfare Ground on Church Street. It has a capacity of 2,500, of which 250 is seated and 400 covered.

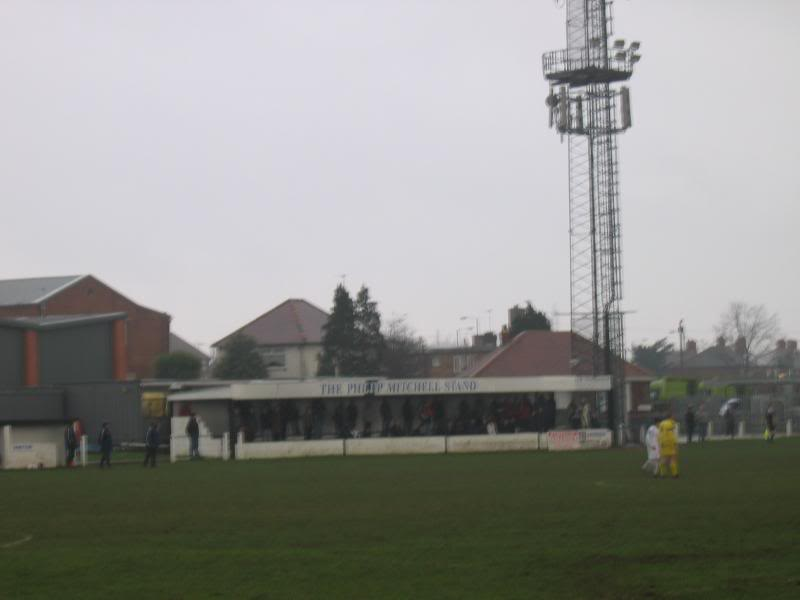
The Philip Mitchell Stand

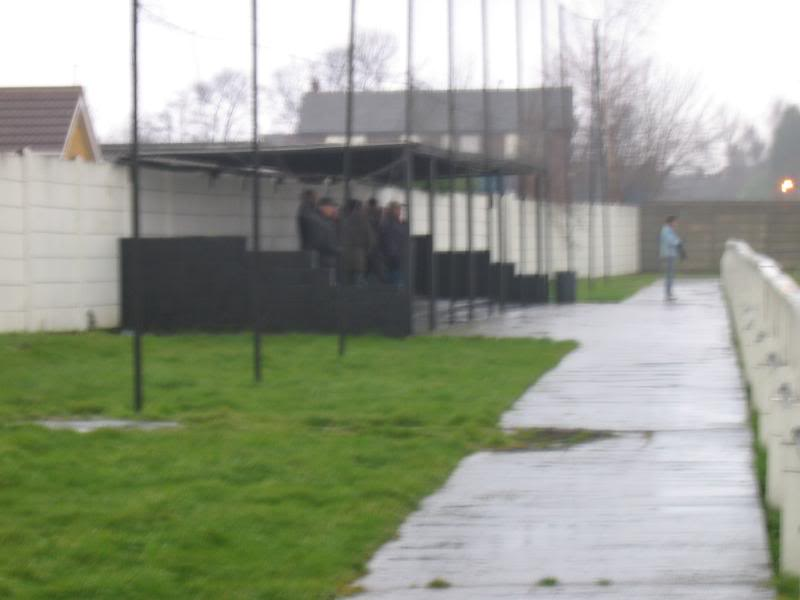
Park Close covered terracing (capacity 200)

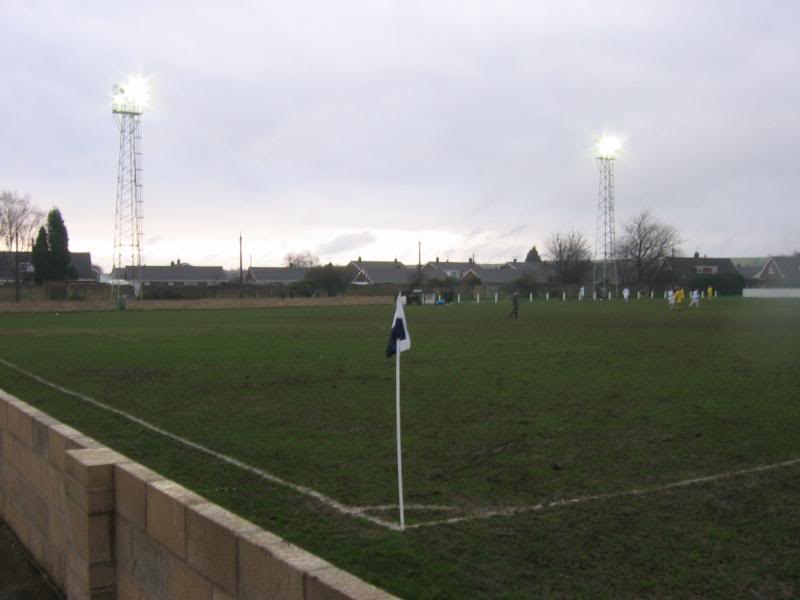
Southfield Road side and dugouts

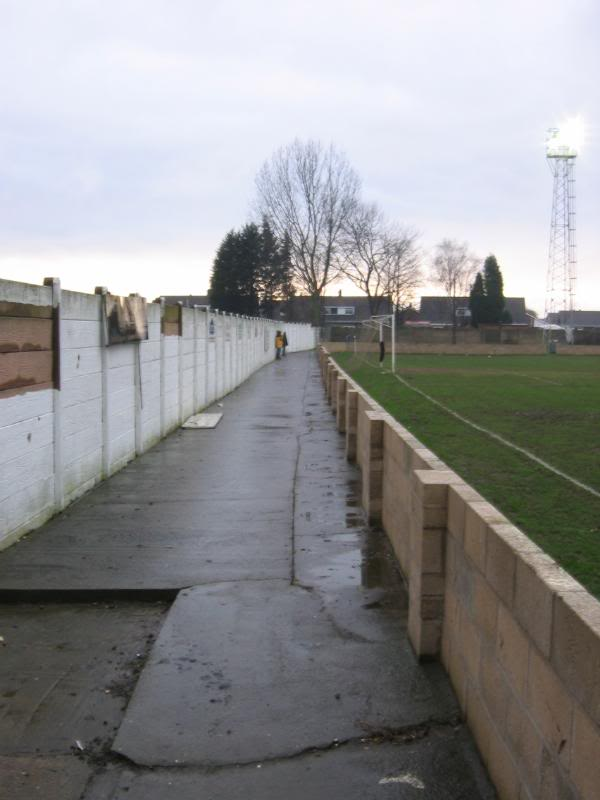
Park End

== Honours ==
- Northern Counties East League
  - Division One Central champions 1984–85
- Doncaster & District Senior League
  - Champions 1952–53, 1953–54, 1954–55, 1956–57, 1957–58, 1960–61, 1961–62, 1964–65, 1982–83
  - Division One champions 1981–82
  - Division Two champions 1978–79
  - Division Three champions 1977–78
  - League Cup winners 1979–80, 1980–81, 1981–82, 1982–83
- West Riding Challenge Cup
  - Winners 1981–82, 1982–83
- Goole & Thorne FA Challenge Cup
  - Winners 1982–83

== Records ==
- Best FA Cup performance: Third qualifying round, 1986–87
- Best FA Amateur Cup performance: Fourth qualifying round, 1957–58
- Best FA Vase performance: Fourth round, 2009–10
- Record attendance: 2,000 vs Doncaster Rovers, pre-season friendly, 1985–86

== See also ==
- Armthorpe Welfare F.C. players
- Armthorpe Welfare F.C. managers
