= 1997–98 Northern Counties East Football League =

The 1997–98 Northern Counties East Football League season was the 16th in the history of Northern Counties East Football League, a football competition in England.

== Premier Division ==
Northern Counties East Football League Premier Division
- Season: 1997–98
- Champions: Hucknall Town
- Promoted: Hucknall Town
- Relegated: Hatfield Main
- Matches: 380
- Goals: 1,199 (3.16 per match)

The Premier Division featured 18 clubs which competed in the previous season, along with two new clubs:

- Curzon Ashton, relegated from the Northern Premier League
- Eccleshill United, promoted from Division One

=== League table ===
Pos	Team	Pld	W	D	L	GF	GA	GD	Pts	Promotion or relegation
1	Hucknall Town	38	26	8	4	90	34	+56	86	Promoted to the Northern Premier League Division One
2	North Ferriby United	38	25	6	7	89	37	+52	81	
3	Ossett Albion	38	21	11	6	59	25	+34	74	
4	Brigg Town	38	20	10	8	76	40	+36	70	
5	Glasshoughton Welfare	38	17	9	12	66	64	+2	60	
6	Maltby Main	38	17	8	13	51	40	+11	59	
7	Ossett Town	38	17	7	14	67	53	+14	58	
8	Eccleshill United	38	16	9	13	64	58	+6	57	
9	Armthorpe Welfare	38	16	8	14	60	44	+16	56	
10	Selby Town	38	15	6	17	60	75	−15	51	
11	Thackley	38	12	12	14	48	55	−7	48	
12	Denaby United	38	14	6	18	55	68	−13	48	
13	Pontefract Collieries	38	13	9	16	60	76	−16	48	
14	Arnold Town	38	10	16	12	55	52	+3	46	
15	Sheffield	38	13	7	18	62	72	−10	46	
16	Pickering Town	38	12	8	18	56	68	−12	44	
17	Hallam	38	10	10	18	52	77	−25	40	
18	Liversedge	38	7	9	22	41	88	−47	30	
19	Curzon Ashton	38	7	8	23	42	75	−33	29	Relegated to the North West Counties League
20	Hatfield Main	38	6	5	27	46	98	−52	23	Relegated to Division One

Source: fchd
Rules for classification: 1) points; 2) goal difference; 3) number of goals scored.

== Division One ==
Northern Counties East Football League Division One
- Season: 1997–98
- Champions: Garforth Town
- Promoted: Garforth Town; Staveley Miners Welfare
- Relegated: Blidworth Welfare
- Matches: 210
- Goals: 820 (3.9 per match)

Division One featured 14 clubs which competed in the previous season, along with one new club:

- Staveley Miners Welfare, joined from the Central Midlands League

=== League table ===
Pos	Team	Pld	W	D	L	GF	GA	GD	Pts	Promotion or relegation
1	Garforth Town	28	23	3	2	77	17	+60	72	Promoted to the Premier Division
2	Staveley Miners Welfare	28	15	9	4	51	30	+21	54	Promoted to the Premier Division
3	Hall Road Rangers	28	16	4	8	68	34	+34	52	
4	Glapwell	28	14	4	10	59	50	+9	46	
5	Parkgate	28	14	3	11	61	47	+14	45	
6	Louth United	28	14	2	12	73	50	+23	44	
7	Worsbrough Bridge Miners Welfare	28	13	4	11	58	57	+1	43	
8	Borrowash Victoria	28	11	8	9	67	50	+17	41	
9	Rossington Main	28	11	4	13	41	46	−5	37	
10	Winterton Rangers	28	11	3	14	41	55	−14	36	
11	Harrogate Railway Athletic	28	10	4	14	58	52	+6	34	
12	Brodsworth Miners Welfare	28	8	9	11	53	43	+10	33	
13	Tadcaster Albion	28	8	6	14	56	46	+10	30	
14	Yorkshire Amateur	28	8	5	15	49	57	−8	29	
15	Blidworth Welfare	28	0	0	28	8	186	−178	0	Relegated to the Central Midlands League

Source: fchd
Rules for classification: 1) points; 2) goal difference; 3) number of goals scored.
