= 1998–99 Northern Counties East Football League =

The 1998–99 Northern Counties East Football League season was the 17th in the history of Northern Counties East Football League, a football competition in England.

== Premier Division ==
Northern Counties East Football League Premier Division
- Season: 1998–99
- Champions: Ossett Albion
- Promoted: Ossett Town
- Relegated: Pickering Town; Pontefract Collieries
- Matches: 380
- Goals: 1,287 (3.39 per match)

The Premier Division featured 17 clubs which competed in the previous season, along with three new clubs.

- Clubs promoted from Division One:
  - Garforth Town
  - Staveley Miners Welfare
- Plus:
  - Buxton, relegated from the Northern Premier League

=== League table ===
Pos	Team	Pld	W	D	L	GF	GA	GD	Pts	Promotion or relegation
1	Ossett Albion	38	23	5	10	86	50	+36	74	
2	Ossett Town	38	22	7	9	76	44	+32	73	Promoted to the Northern Premier League Division One
3	Brigg Town	38	20	12	6	78	43	+35	72	
4	Hallam	38	22	5	11	95	63	+32	71	
5	North Ferriby United	38	19	12	7	92	50	+42	69	
6	Liversedge	38	21	4	13	87	63	+24	67	
7	Arnold Town	38	19	7	12	78	56	+22	64	
8	Denaby United	38	15	12	11	66	60	+6	57	
9	Garforth Town	38	15	9	14	74	70	+4	54	
10	Buxton	38	14	10	14	54	53	+1	52	
11	Selby Town	38	15	7	16	59	61	−2	52	
12	Sheffield	38	15	6	17	55	58	−3	51	
13	Armthorpe Welfare	38	13	11	14	46	50	−4	50	
14	Glasshoughton Welfare	38	13	9	16	58	71	−13	48	
15	Thackley	38	14	5	19	65	77	−12	47	
16	Eccleshill United	38	12	6	20	56	74	−18	42	
17	Staveley Miners Welfare	38	9	11	18	50	84	−34	36 (Note: Staveley Miners Welfare, Maltby Main and Pontefract Collieries were deducted 2 points.)	
18	Maltby Main	38	8	6	24	51	87	−36	28	
19	Pontefract Collieries	38	7	7	24	37	86	−49	26	Relegated to Division One
20	Pickering Town	38	5	7	26	44	107	−63	22	Relegated to Division One

Source: fchd
Rules for classification: 1) points; 2) goal difference; 3) number of goals scored.

== Division One ==
Northern Counties East Football League Division One
- Season: 1998–99
- Champions: Harrogate Railway Athletic
- Promoted: Brodsworth Miners Welfare; Harrogate Railway Athletic
- Matches: 156
- Goals: 556 (3.56 per match)

Division One featured 12 clubs which competed in the previous season, along with one new club:

- Hatfield Main, relegated from the Premier Division

=== League table ===
Pos	Team	Pld	W	D	L	GF	GA	GD	Pts	Promotion or relegation
1	Harrogate Railway Athletic	24	15	6	3	58	29	+29	51	Promoted to the Premier Division
2	Brodsworth Miners Welfare	24	13	3	8	52	42	+10	42	Promoted to the Premier Division
3	Glapwell	24	12	6	6	47	39	+8	42	
4	Parkgate	24	12	5	7	61	32	+29	41	
5	Borrowash Victoria	24	12	5	7	48	38	+10	41	
6	Worsbrough Bridge Miners Welfare	24	9	6	9	49	42	+7	33	
7	Hall Road Rangers	24	9	6	9	44	49	−5	33	
8	Hatfield Main	24	10	3	11	27	47	−20	31 (Note: Hatfield Main were deducted 2 points.)	
9	Louth United	24	9	3	12	37	33	+4	30	
10	Yorkshire Amateur	24	6	7	11	41	49	−8	25	
11	Tadcaster Albion	24	6	6	12	33	51	−18	24	
12	Rossington Main	24	6	4	14	37	51	−14	22	
13	Winterton Rangers	24	3	8	13	22	54	−32	17	

Source: fchd
Rules for classification: 1) points; 2) goal difference; 3) number of goals scored.

== Cup Competitions ==
=== League Cup ===
Quarterfinals
Ossett Albion	1
Denaby United	2
Arnold Town	3
North Ferriby United	6
Selby Town	1
Ossett Town	0
Armthorpe Welfare	1
Guiseley	0

Semifinals
Denaby United	2
North Ferriby United	1
Selby Town	1
Armthorpe Welfare	0

Final
Denaby United	1
Selby Town	0

=== President's Cup ===
- North Ferriby United beat Garforth Town 6–1 on aggregate

=== Wilkinson's Sword Trophy ===
For first division teams

- Yorkshire Amateur beat Parkgate 8–2 on aggregate
