= Glasshoughton Welfare A.F.C. =

Association football club in Castleford, England

Coordinates: 53°42′58.81″N 1°20′41.54″W

Glasshoughton Welfare
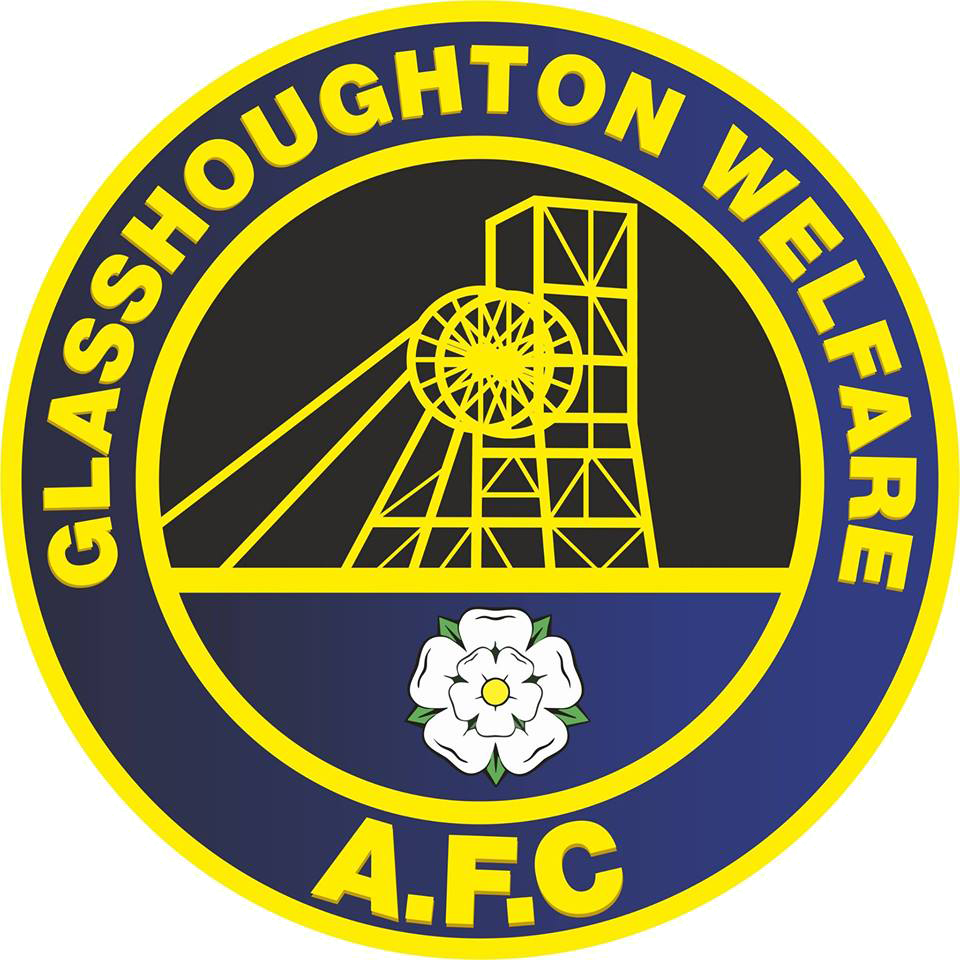
- Full name: Glasshoughton Welfare Association Football Club
- Nicknames: Welfare; Hoops
- Founded: 1964
- Ground: Leeds Road, Castleford
- Capacity: 2,000 (250 seated)
- Chairman: Jon Miles
- Manager: Darren Holmes & Lee Vigars
- League: West Yorkshire League Premier Division
- 2025–26: Northern Counties East League Division One, 22nd of 22 (relegated)
Home colours	Away colours

Glasshoughton Welfare Association Football Club is a football club based in Glasshoughton near Castleford, West Yorkshire, England. They are currently members of the West Yorkshire League Premier Division and play at Leeds Road.

== History ==
The club was established in 1964 as a Sunday league works team under the name Anson Sports. They initially played in the Castleford Sunday League, and adopted their current name in 1974 after moving to the sports ground of Glasshoughton Colliery on Leeds Road. The new ground enabled them to switch to Saturday football, with the club joining the West Yorkshire League. In 1985 they were admitted to Division Three of the Northern Counties East League. The division was abolished at the end of the 1985–86 season, with the club moved up to Division Two.

After a sixth-place finish in 1989–90, Glasshoughton were promoted to Division One, and the following season league restructuring saw them placed in the Premier Division. In 1993–94 they won the West Riding County Cup, beating Selby Town 4–0 in the final. In 1997–98 they won the league's President Cup, beating Ossett Albion 7–2 on aggregate in a two-legged final; the home leg was watched by a record crowd of 350.

Despite only two top-half finishes, including a best-ever third-place in 1999–2000, Glasshoughton remained in the Premier Division until being relegated at the end of the 2007–08 season, which saw them finish bottom of the Premier Division. They finished bottom of Division One the following season, failing to win a league match all season, but after two seasons of improvement, they were Division One runners-up in 2011–12, earning promotion to the Premier Division. In 2014–15 the club finished bottom of the Premier Division and were relegated back to Division One.

In 2025–26 Glasshoughton finished bottom of Division One and were relegated to the Premier Division of the West Yorkshire League.

== Ground ==
The club play at the Leeds Road ground, which is part of the Glasshoughton Leisure complex. It has a modern seated stand on one side the pitch and a covered terrace at the Leeds Road end.

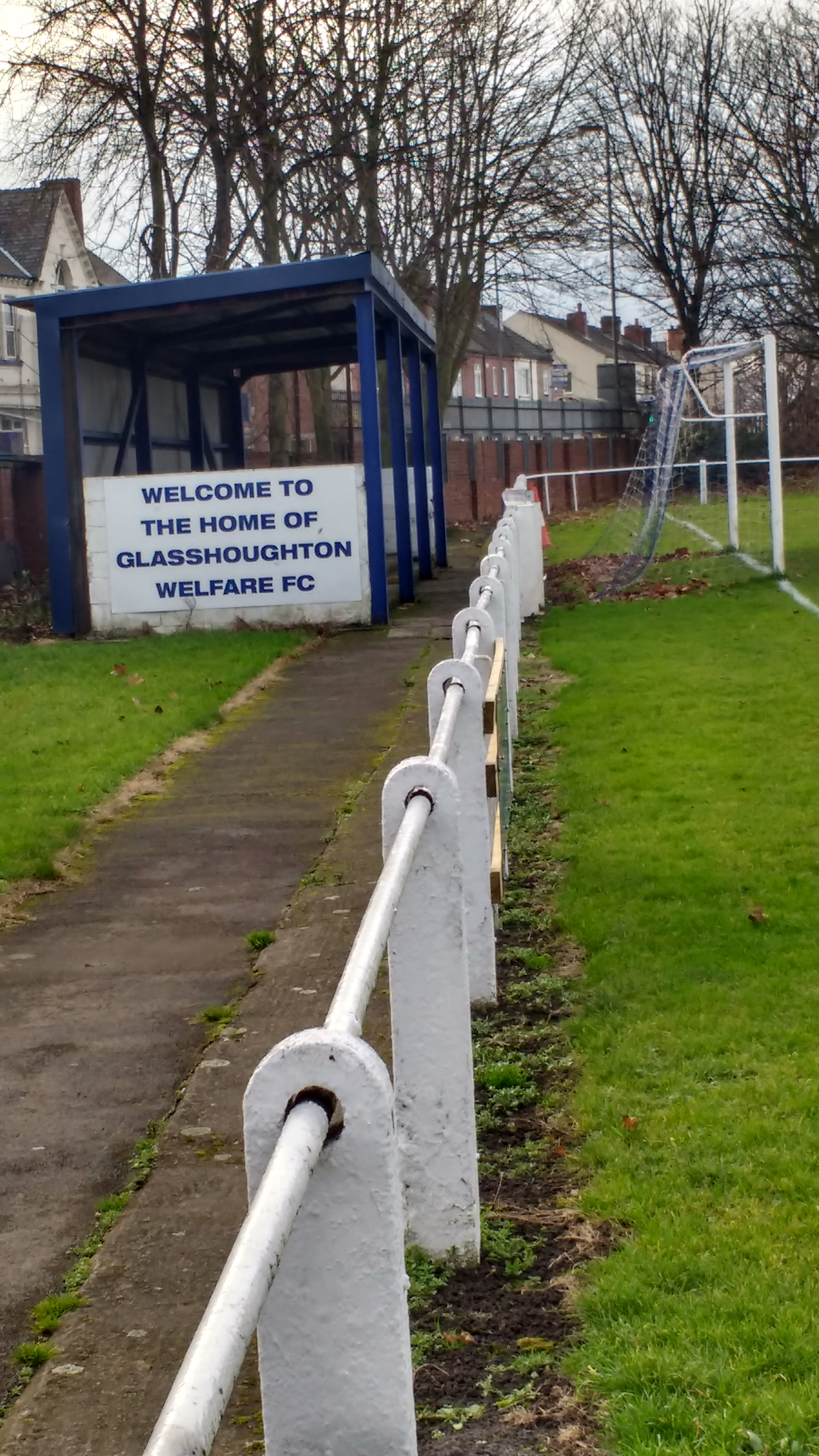
Covered terracing

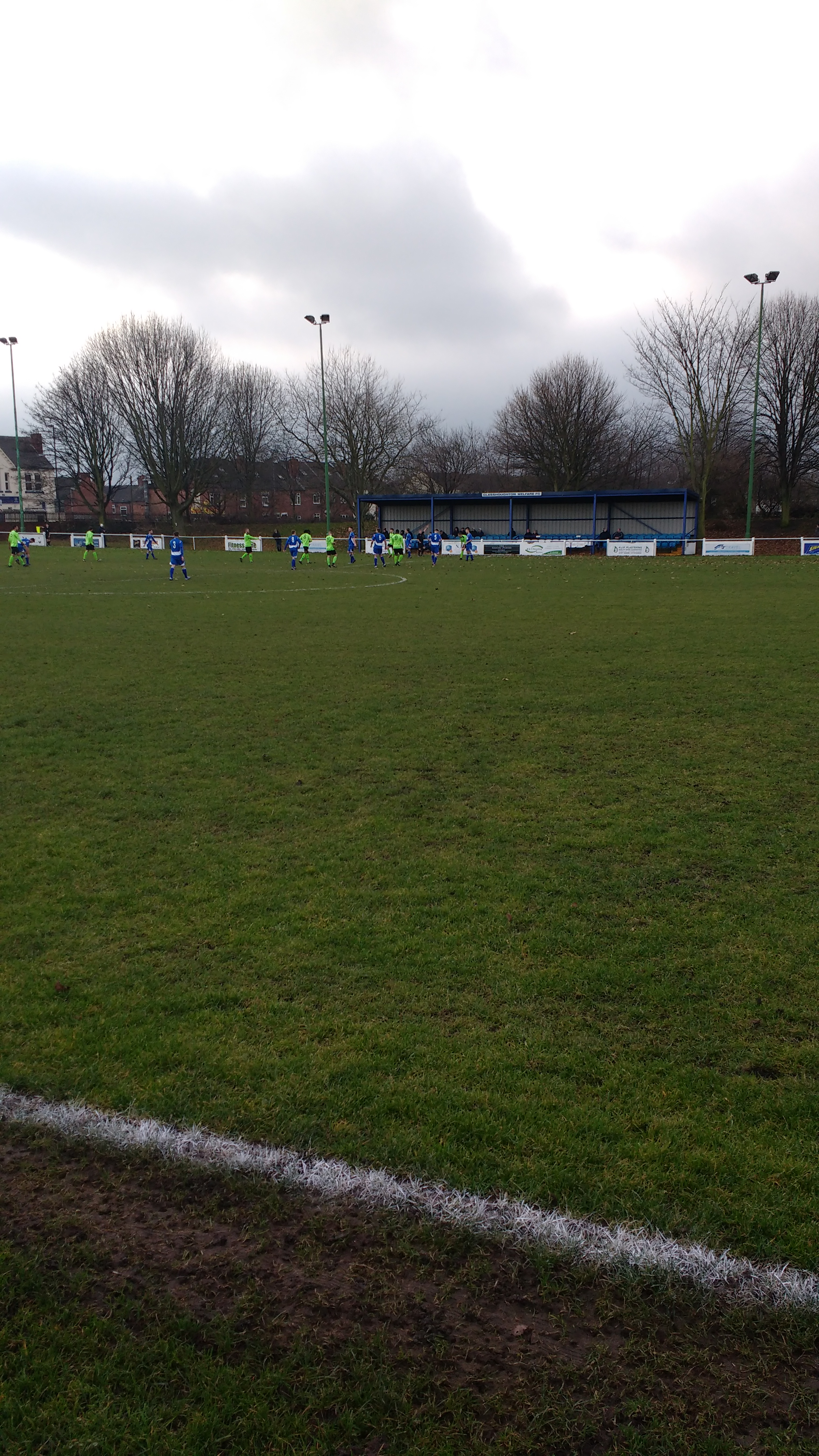
Seated stand

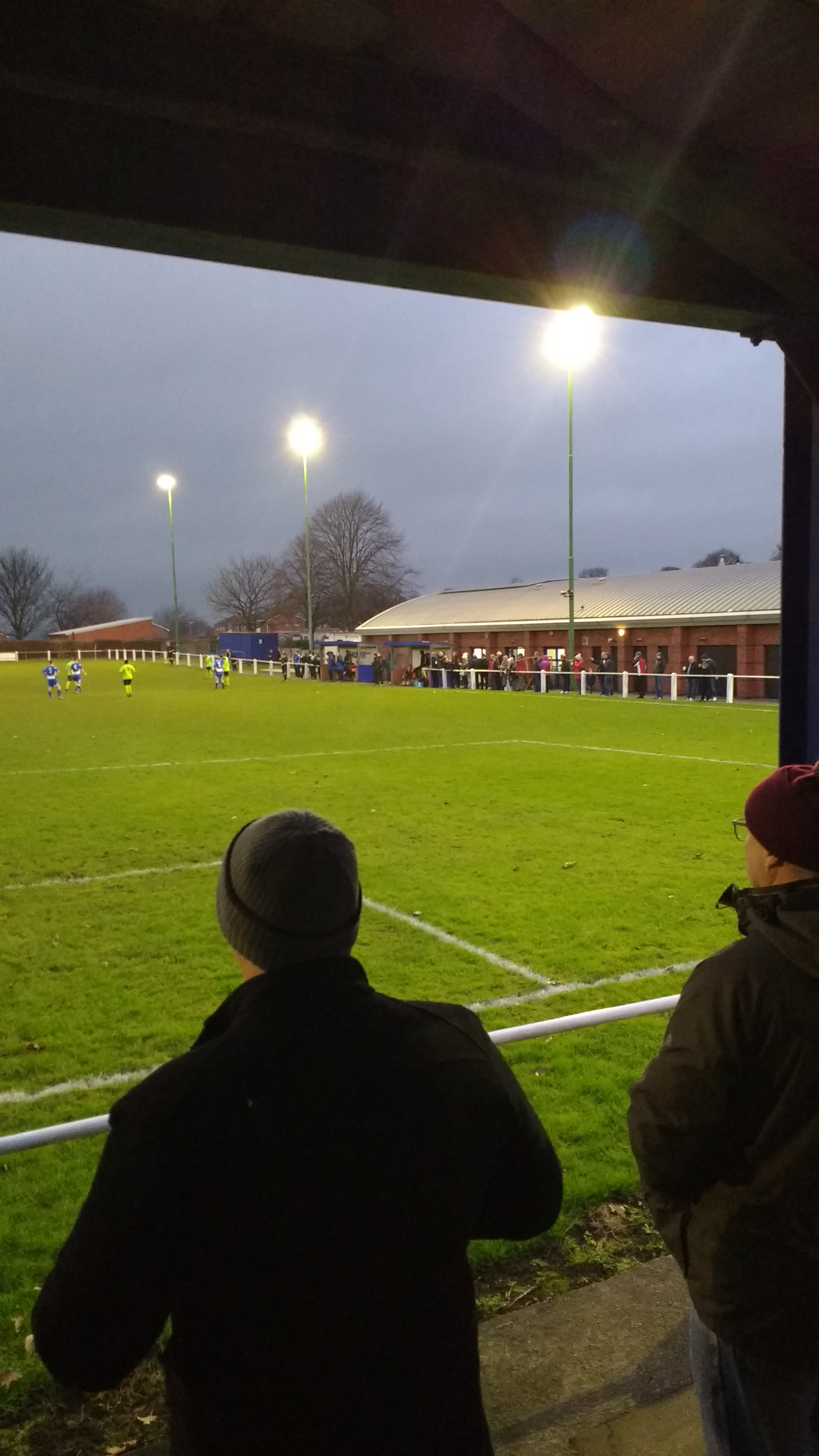
Clubhouse and dugouts

== Honours ==
- Northern Counties East League
  - President's Cup winners 1997–98
- West Riding County Cup
  - Winners 1993–94

== Records ==
- Best FA Cup performance: Third qualifying round, 2004–05
- Best FA Vase performance: Fourth round, 2006–07
- Record attendance: 350 vs Ossett Albion, Northern Counties East League President's Cup final, 1998
- Biggest win: 8–1
- Heaviest defeat: 8–0

== See also ==
- Glasshoughton Welfare A.F.C. players
- Glasshoughton Welfare A.F.C. managers
