= 1999–2000 Northern Counties East Football League =

The 1999–2000 Northern Counties East Football League season was the 18th in the history of Northern Counties East Football League, a football competition in England.

== Premier Division ==
Northern Counties East Football League Premier Division
- Season: 1999–2000
- Champions: North Ferriby United
- Promoted: North Ferriby United
- Matches: 380
- Goals: 1,180 (3.11 per match)

The Premier Division featured 17 clubs which competed in the previous season, along with three new clubs.

- Clubs promoted from Division One:
  - Brodsworth Miners Welfare
  - Harrogate Railway Athletic
- Plus:
  - Alfreton Town, relegated from the Northern Premier League

=== League table ===
Pos	Team	Pld	W	D	L	GF	GA	GD	Pts	Promotion or relegation
1	North Ferriby United	38	25	10	3	87	31	+56	85	Promoted to the Northern Premier League Division One
2	Brigg Town	38	25	6	7	73	38	+35	81	
3	Glasshoughton Welfare	38	20	6	12	68	57	+11	66	
4	Liversedge	38	20	5	13	76	45	+31	65	
5	Alfreton Town	38	17	11	10	73	49	+24	62	
6	Brodsworth Miners Welfare	38	15	10	13	66	69	−3	55	
7	Ossett Albion	38	15	9	14	70	60	+10	54	
8	Arnold Town	38	14	11	13	60	47	+13	53	
9	Selby Town	38	13	14	11	53	49	+4	53	
10	Eccleshill United	38	15	8	15	59	65	−6	53	
11	Armthorpe Welfare	38	14	10	14	45	50	−5	52	
12	Hallam	38	14	9	15	72	67	+5	51	
13	Denaby United	38	13	11	14	46	41	+5	50	
14	Sheffield	38	12	13	13	62	55	+7	49	
15	Garforth Town	38	10	11	17	53	65	−12	41	
16	Harrogate Railway Athletic	38	11	6	21	54	95	−41	39	
17	Maltby Main	38	8	12	18	36	58	−22	36	Demoted to Division One
18	Buxton	38	11	6	21	35	67	−32	36 (Note: Buxton were deducted 3 points.)	
19	Staveley Miners Welfare	38	9	8	21	53	83	−30	35	
20	Thackley	38	6	10	22	39	89	−50	28	

Source: fchd
Rules for classification: 1) points; 2) goal difference; 3) number of goals scored.

== Division One ==
Northern Counties East Football League Division One
- Season: 1999–2000
- Champions: Goole
- Promoted: Glapwell; Goole
- Matches: 240
- Goals: 777 (3.24 per match)

Division One featured 11 clubs which competed in the previous season, along with five new clubs.

- Clubs relegated from the Premier Division:
  - Pickering Town
  - Pontefract Collieries
- Clubs joined from the Central Midlands League:
  - Goole
  - Mickleover Sports
- Plus:
  - Bridlington Town, joined from the East Riding County League

=== League table ===
Pos	Team	Pld	W	D	L	GF	GA	GD	Pts	Promotion or relegation
1	Goole	30	22	5	3	66	19	+47	71	Promoted to the Premier Division
2	Glapwell	30	18	6	6	74	36	+38	60	Promoted to the Premier Division
3	Borrowash Victoria	30	14	8	8	48	35	+13	50	
4	Mickleover Sports	30	14	7	9	52	44	+8	49	
5	Bridlington Town	30	15	4	11	43	36	+7	49	
6	Winterton Rangers	30	13	9	8	52	31	+21	48	
7	Yorkshire Amateur	30	14	5	11	55	37	+18	47	
8	Hall Road Rangers	30	14	5	11	58	49	+9	47	
9	Louth United	30	12	4	14	51	62	−11	40	
10	Worsbrough Bridge Miners Welfare	30	11	6	13	44	46	−2	39	
11	Pickering Town	30	11	5	14	46	36	+10	38	
12	Parkgate	30	11	5	14	58	59	−1	38	
13	Pontefract Collieries	30	8	9	13	34	50	−16	33	
14	Tadcaster Albion	30	7	3	20	33	84	−51	24	
15	Rossington Main	30	5	7	18	27	62	−35	22	
16	Hatfield Main	30	5	4	21	36	91	−55	19	

Source: fchd
Rules for classification: 1) points; 2) goal difference; 3) number of goals scored.
