= 1994–95 FA Cup qualifying rounds =

1994-95 FA Cup qualifying rounds
Tournament details
- Country: England; Wales

The 1994–95 FA Cup qualifying rounds opened the 114th season of competition in England for 'The Football Association Challenge Cup' (FA Cup), the world's oldest association football single knockout competition. A total of 557 clubs were accepted for the competition, up 18 from the previous season's 539.

The large number of clubs entering the tournament from lower down (Levels 5 through 8) in the English football pyramid meant that the competition started with five rounds of preliminary (1) and qualifying (4) knockouts for these non-League teams. The 28 winning teams from fourth round qualifying progressed to the First round proper, where League teams tiered at Levels 3 and 4 entered the competition.

== Calendar ==
Round	Start date	New Entries	Clubs
Preliminary round	Saturday 27 August 1994	306	557 → 404
First round qualifying	Saturday 10 September 1994	135	404 → 260
Second round qualifying	Saturday 24 September 1994	none	260 → 188
Third round qualifying	Saturday 8 October 1994	none	188 → 152
Fourth round qualifying	Saturday 22 October 1994	20	152 → 124
First round proper	Saturday 12 November 1994	52	124 → 84
Second round proper	Saturday 3 December 1994	none	84 → 64
Third round proper	Saturday 7 January 1995	44	64 → 32
Fourth round proper	Saturday 28 January 1995	none	32 → 16
Fifth round proper	Saturday 18 February 1995	none	16 → 8
Sixth round proper	Saturday 11 March 1995	none	8 → 4
Semi-finals	Sunday 9 April 1995	none	4 → 2
Final	Saturday 20 May 1995	none	2 → 1

== Preliminary round ==
=== Ties ===
Tie	Home team	Score	Away team
1	Abingdon Town	0-0	Cove
2	Alfreton Town	3-1	Ashton United
3	Arlesey Town	1-2	Brook House
4	Armitage '90	1-1	Brierley Hill Town
5	Arnold Town	3-2	Castleton Gabriels
6	Arundel	1-3	Burgess Hill Town
7	Atherton Collieries	1-1	Blidworth Welfare
8	Aveley	1-1	Wootton Blue Cross
9	Banstead Athletic w/o-scr Ash United		
10	Belper Town	2-1	Blackpool Rovers
11	Bemerton Heath Harlequins	0-4	Aldershot Town
12	Berkhamsted Town	1-3	Baldock Town
13	Bideford	2-1	Falmouth Town
14	Biggleswade Town	0-1	Feltham & Hounslow Borough
15	Blakenall	3-2	Banbury United
16	Bolehall Swifts	3-1	Barwell
17	Bootle	0-0	Maltby Miners Welfare
18	Bourne Town	1-4	Billericay Town
19	Bournemouth	0-0	Basingstoke Town
20	Bowers United	1-4	Barking
21	Bracknell Town	1-3	Ashford Town (Kent)
22	Bradford Park Avenue	0-3	Burscough
23	Brandon United	5-2	Alnwick Town
24	Bridgnorth Town	3-1	Bilston Town
25	Bridport	1-2	Backwell United
26	Brimsdown Rovers	1-1	Sudbury Wanderers
27	Buckingham Town	1-0	Brockenhurst
28	Burnham	4-0	Clapton
29	Burnham Ramblers	2-3	King's Lynn
30	Bury Town	0-4	Boston Town
31	Caernarfon Town	3-1	Darwen
32	Calne Town	1-3	Torrington
33	Canterbury City	6-0	Newhaven
34	Chadderton	3-2	Armthorpe Welfare
35	Chalfont St Peter w/o-scr Dunstable		
36	Clitheroe	1-0	Bamber Bridge
37	Cogenhoe United	1-1	Eastwood Hanley
38	Collier Row	2-1	Cheshunt
39	Congleton Town	4-2	Curzon Ashton
40	Corinthian	9-0	Crowborough Athletic
41	Cornard United	2-0	Chatteris Town
42	Crook Town	1-1	Billingham Town
43	Croydon	7-0	Three Bridges
44	Croydon Athletic	5-2	Malden Vale
45	Denaby United	1-1	Hallam
46	Dudley Town	2-1	Rothwell Town
47	Dunston Federation Brewery	1-0	Darlington Cleveland Social
48	Eastbourne Town	1-7	Egham Town
49	Elmore	4-0	Chippenham Town
50	Epsom & Ewell	1-3	Wembley
51	Evenwood Town	0-3	Consett
52	Evesham United	1-3	Tamworth
53	Eynesbury Rovers	2-3	Gorleston
54	Fareham Town	3-1	Eastleigh
55	Farsley Celtic	3-1	Great Harwood Town
56	Fleet Town	3-1	Oxford City
57	Fleetwood Town	0-3	Eastwood Town
58	Folkestone Invicta	2-0	Hailsham Town
59	Forest Green Rovers	0-0	Cinderford Town
60	Glasshoughton Welfare	1-0	Eccleshill United
61	Glastonbury	4-1	Frome Town
62	Goole Town	0-2	Glossop North End
63	Grantham Town	2-0	Leicester United
64	Guisborough Town	2-0	Eppleton Colliery Welfare
65	Hampton	1-0	Pagham
66	Hanwell Town	1-2	Whyteleafe
67	Haringey Borough	1-2	Ford United
68	Harrogate Town	7-0	Esh Winning
69	Hatfield Main	1-2	Brigg Town
70	Haverhill Rovers	2-1	Great Yarmouth Town
71	Herne Bay	3-0	Langney Sports
72	Hertford Town	2-5	Saffron Walden Town
73	Hillingdon Borough	2-2	Royston Town
74	Hinckley Athletic	2-1	Hinckley Town
75	Hoddesdon Town	1-1	Harefield United
76	Holbeach United	1-2	Heybridge Swifts
77	Horsham Y M C A	2-1	Lancing
78	Hucknall Town	0-0	West Midlands Police
79	Hungerford Town	3-2	Gosport Borough
80	Ilfracombe Town	0-2	Paulton Rovers
81	Immingham Town	1-2	Heanor Town
82	Kingsbury Town	1-4	Kempston Rovers
83	Leatherhead	8-0	Letchworth Garden City
84	Leighton Town	2-2	Leyton
85	Lewes	0-1	Fisher '93
86	Littlehampton Town	2-7	Merstham
87	Liversedge	2-2	Ilkeston Town
88	Long Buckby	3-3	Northampton Spencer
89	Lowestoft Town	2-2	Diss Town
90	Lye Town	2-0	Racing Club Warwick
91	Maidenhead United	0-1	Havant Town
92	Maine Road	3-1	Louth United
93	Melksham Town	4-1	Keynsham Town
94	Mirrlees Blackstone	2-2	Stamford
95	Murton	3-2	Hebburn
96	Nantwich Town	2-1	Newcastle Town
97	Newmarket Town	4-2	Soham Town Rangers
98	Northwood	2-1	Godalming & Guildford
99	Oakwood	0-3	Peacehaven & Telscombe
100	Odd Down	0-6	Newport A F C
101	Oldbury United	1-3	Moor Green
102	Ossett Albion	1-4	Rossendale United
103	Ossett Town	0-0	Mossley
104	Pelsall Villa	2-0	Newport Pagnell Town
105	Penrith	2-3	Tow Law Town
106	Poole Town	3-0	Witney Town
107	Prescot	2-0	Pontefract Collieries
108	Ramsgate	4-0	Redhill
109	Redditch United	7-0	Bedworth United
110	Romford	2-0	Wingate & Finchley
111	Ruislip Manor	5-0	Flackwell Heath
112	Ryde	3-2	Thatcham Town
113	Ryhope Community Association	1-5	Pickering Town
114	Salisbury City	5-0	A F C Totton
115	Seaham Red Star	3-1	Easington Colliery
116	Selsey	1-4	Portfield
117	Sheffield	3-1	Rossington Main
118	Shoreham	1-0	Ringmer
119	Slade Green	0-3	Tilbury
120	South Shields	7-1	Prudhoe Town
121	Southall	2-1	Langford
122	Spalding United	1-0	March Town United
123	St Helens Town	7-1	Salford City
124	Stapenhill	2-1	Rushall Olympic
125	Steyning Town	0-2	Sheppey United
126	Stockton	2-2	R T M Newcastle
127	Stotfold	2-1	Tower Hamlets
128	Stourbridge	1-1	Sandwell Borough
129	Stowmarket Town	2-2	Tiptree United
130	Stratford Town	0-2	Halesowen Harriers
131	Sutton Coldfield Town	2-3	Stourport Swifts
132	Taunton Town	3-2	Clevedon Town
133	Thackley	0-2	Radcliffe Borough
134	Thame United	2-0	Devizes Town
135	Thamesmead Town	0-3	Bedfont
136	Tonbridge Angels	1-1	Chipstead
137	Tring Town	0-1	Wealdstone
138	Uxbridge	1-0	Corinthian Casuals
139	Walthamstow Pennant	2-2	Ware
140	Wednesfield	1-1	Desborough Town
141	Welton Rovers	1-1	Saltash United
142	Welwyn Garden City	1-1	Viking Sports
143	West Auckland Town	1-1	Workington
144	Westfields	1-1	Wellingborough Town
145	Whickham	1-2	Willington
146	Whitstable Town	2-3	Tunbridge Wells
147	Windsor & Eton	1-0	Whitehawk
148	Winterton Rangers	3-0	Stocksbridge Park Steels
149	Wisbech Town	3-0	Fakenham Town
150	Witham Town	1-0	Watton United
151	Worthing	1-0	Horsham
152	Yate Town	2-1	Swanage Town & Herston
153	Yorkshire Amateur	0-1	Atherton Laburnum Rovers

=== Replays ===
Tie	Home team	Score	Away team
1	Cove	1-0	Abingdon Town
4	Brierley Hill Town	1-3	Armitage '90
7	Blidworth Welfare	1-3	Atherton Collieries
8	Wootton Blue Cross	1-3	Aveley
17	Maltby Miners Welfare	1-0	Bootle
19	Basingstoke Town	3-1	Bournemouth
26	Sudbury Wanderers	1-0	Brimsdown Rovers
37	Eastwood Hanley	0-0	Cogenhoe United
42	Billingham Town	1-2	Crook Town
45	Hallam	1-0	Denaby United
59	Cinderford Town	3-2	Forest Green Rovers
73	Royston Town	1-2	Hillingdon Borough
75	Harefield United	1-0	Hoddesdon Town
78	West Midlands Police	1-1	Hucknall Town
84	Leyton	1-0	Leighton Town
87	Ilkeston Town	4-1	Liversedge
88	Northampton Spencer	2-1	Long Buckby
89	Diss Town	3-3	Lowestoft Town
94	Stamford	4-1	Mirrlees Blackstone
103	Mossley	3-0	Ossett Town
126	R T M Newcastle	6-1	Stockton
128	Sandwell Borough	0-2	Stourbridge
129	Tiptree United	3-1	Stowmarket Town
136	Chipstead	0-3	Tonbridge Angels
139	Ware	4-0	Walthamstow Pennant
140	Desborough Town	2-1	Wednesfield
141	Saltash United	4-0	Welton Rovers
142	Viking Sports	0-1	Welwyn Garden City
143	Workington	1-2	West Auckland Town
144	Wellingborough Town	1-3	Westfields

=== 2nd replays ===
Tie	Home team	Score	Away team
37	Cogenhoe United	2-4	Eastwood Hanley
78	Hucknall Town	0-1	West Midlands Police
89	Diss Town	1-0	Lowestoft Town

== 1st qualifying round ==
=== Ties ===
Tie	Home team	Score	Away team
1	Alfreton Town	2-2	Guiseley
2	Armitage '90	2-2	Blakenall
3	Arnold Town	1-2	Congleton Town
4	Ashford Town (Kent)	5-0	Chatham Town
5	Atherstone United	1-1	Boldmere St Michaels
6	Atherton Collieries	2-0	Buxton
7	Atherton Laburnum Rovers	1-1	Belper Town
8	Aveley	1-2	Edgware Town
9	Aylesbury United	3-1	Boreham Wood
10	Backwell United	0-6	Elmore
11	Barking	3-1	Canvey Island
12	Barrow	4-1	Chester-Le-Street Town
13	Basingstoke Town	2-4	Newport I O W
14	Bedfont	0-3	Purfleet
15	Bideford	4-0	Saltash United
16	Bishop Auckland	2-0	Harrogate Railway Athletic
17	Bishop's Stortford	1-1	Braintree Town
18	Bolehall Swifts	2-3	Solihull Borough
19	Boston Town	1-0	Basildon United
20	Boston United	2-0	Harwich & Parkeston
21	Bridgnorth Town	1-1	Pershore Town
22	Brigg Town	0-4	Morecambe
23	Bromley	3-2	Bognor Regis Town
24	Brook House	0-7	Baldock Town
25	Buckingham Town	2-1	Aldershot Town
26	Burgess Hill Town	4-3	Banstead Athletic
27	Burnham	2-0	East Thurrock United
28	Burscough	1-0	Horwich R M I
29	Caernarfon Town	2-2	Chorley
30	Canterbury City	1-2	Peacehaven & Telscombe
31	Chadderton	1-1	Winsford United
32	Chalfont St Peter	2-2	Collier Row
33	Chelmsford City	1-0	Barton Rovers
34	Chesham United	4-2	Concord Rangers
35	Cinderford Town	3-2	Mangotsfield United
36	Clitheroe	1-2	Willington
37	Colwyn Bay	4-0	Flixton
38	Consett	1-1	Northallerton
39	Corby Town	0-5	Paget Rangers
40	Corinthian	1-2	Hastings Town
41	Cornard United	0-4	Billericay Town
42	Cove	0-2	Andover
43	Crook Town	0-2	Blyth Spartans
44	Croydon	0-0	Carshalton Athletic
45	Croydon Athletic	0-0	Metropolitan Police
46	Desborough Town	1-0	Chasetown
47	Diss Town	1-0	Sudbury Town
48	Dorchester Town	3-1	A F C Lymington
49	Droylsden	0-3	Lincoln United
50	Dudley Town	0-1	Leek Town
51	Dunston Federation Brewery	2-0	Brandon United
52	Durham City	5-0	Peterlee Newtown
53	Eastwood Hanley	1-0	Rushden & Diamonds
54	Emley	4-1	Oldham Town
55	Enfield	5-2	Hemel Hempstead
56	Fareham Town	1-2	Hungerford Town
57	Farsley Celtic	3-0	Whitley Bay
58	Feltham & Hounslow Borough	1-3	Dagenham & Redbridge
59	Fisher '93	2-4	Kingstonian
60	Fleet Town	0-1	Newbury Town
61	Folkestone Invicta	1-0	Sittingbourne
62	Frickley Athletic	1-1	Skelmersdale United
63	Glasshoughton Welfare	0-5	Worksop Town
64	Glastonbury	0-3	Barnstaple Town
65	Glossop North End	2-2	Eastwood Town
66	Gloucester City	3-0	Exmouth Town
67	Grantham Town	2-4	Burton Albion
68	Halesowen Harriers	3-3	Hinckley Athletic
69	Halesowen Town	2-1	Willenhall Town
70	Hallam	0-3	Hyde United
71	Hampton	1-1	Gravesend & Northfleet
72	Harefield United	0-2	Hornchurch
73	Harrogate Town	4-1	Gretna
74	Havant Town	1-1	Bashley
75	Haverhill Rovers	1-1	Felixstowe Town
76	Herne Bay	1-3	Dulwich Hamlet
77	Heybridge Swifts	0-0	Gorleston
78	Hillingdon Borough	2-1	Southall
79	Ilkeston Town	2-2	Lancaster City
80	Kempston Rovers	2-4	Wisbech Town
81	King's Lynn	0-1	Halstead Town
82	Leatherhead	1-1	Hayes
83	Leyton	1-2	St Albans City
84	Lye Town	1-5	Moor Green
85	Maine Road	1-0	Heanor Town
86	Maltby Miners Welfare	0-4	Knowsley United
87	Merstham	0-2	Margate
88	Molesey	1-1	Southwick
89	Mossley	2-4	Northwich Victoria
90	Murton	1-1	Guisborough Town
91	Newmarket Town	1-2	Hitchin Town
92	Newport A F C	4-1	Melksham Town
93	Northampton Spencer	1-4	Hednesford Town
94	Northwood	3-0	Erith & Belvedere
95	Paulton Rovers	2-0	Moreton Town
96	Pelsall Villa	0-1	Raunds Town
97	Poole Town	5-1	Ryde
98	Portfield	0-3	Tooting & Mitcham United
99	Prescot	1-3	Nantwich Town
100	R T M Newcastle	0-3	Gateshead
101	Radcliffe Borough	1-0	North Ferriby United
102	Ramsgate	0-0	Shoreham
103	Redditch United	1-1	Westfields
104	Rocester	1-0	Stewart & Lloyds Corby
105	Romford	4-3	Grays Athletic
106	Rossendale United	1-2	Matlock Town
107	Ruislip Manor	2-1	Ford United
108	Saffron Walden Town	1-4	Stevenage Borough
109	Salisbury City	2-0	Worcester City
110	Sandwell Borough	1-2	Gresley Rovers
111	Seaham Red Star	2-2	Billingham Synthonia
112	Sheppey United	0-1	Chertsey Town
113	South Shields	0-0	Netherfield
114	Spalding United	0-3	Cambridge City
115	Spennymoor United	4-1	Shildon
116	St Helens Town	0-4	Warrington Town
117	Stamford	2-3	Tiptree United
118	Stotfold	1-3	Yeading
119	Stourport Swifts	2-1	Stapenhill
120	Sudbury Wanderers	0-1	Hendon
121	Tamworth	1-1	Telford United
122	Taunton Town	2-2	Weston Super Mare
123	Thame United	0-0	Wimborne Town
124	Tilbury	0-1	Staines Town
125	Tiverton Town	7-1	St Blazey
126	Tonbridge Angels	3-1	Egham Town
127	Torrington	2-0	Weymouth
128	Tow Law Town	4-0	Pickering Town
129	Trowbridge Town	7-0	Minehead
130	Uxbridge	1-1	Dorking
131	Walton & Hersham	3-0	Wick
132	Waterlooville	1-0	Westbury United
133	Wealdstone	0-1	Harrow Borough
134	Welwyn Garden City	1-2	Ware
135	Wembley	4-1	Tunbridge Wells
136	West Auckland Town	0-2	Whitby Town
137	West Midlands Police	0-0	Gainsborough Trinity
138	Whyteleafe	0-0	Dover Athletic
139	Windsor & Eton	0-1	Welling United
140	Winterton Rangers	0-1	Sheffield
141	Witham Town	2-0	Wivenhoe Town
142	Wokingham Town	5-0	Bicester Town
143	Worthing	5-3	Horsham Y M C A
144	Yate Town	0-3	Merthyr Tydfil

=== Replays ===
Tie	Home team	Score	Away team
1	Guiseley	4-2	Alfreton Town
2	Blakenall	2-0	Armitage '90
5	Boldmere St Michaels	0-1	Atherstone United
7	Belper Town	0-2	Atherton Laburnum Rovers
17	Braintree Town	3-0	Bishop's Stortford
21	Pershore Town	0-2	Bridgnorth Town
29	Chorley	2-1	Caernarfon Town
31	Winsford United	5-6	Chadderton
32	Collier Row	2-1	Chalfont St Peter
38	Northallerton	1-3	Consett
44	Carshalton Athletic	5-0	Croydon
45	Metropolitan Police	0-1	Croydon Athletic
62	Skelmersdale United	1-4	Frickley Athletic
65	Eastwood Town	1-1	Glossop North End
68	Hinckley Athletic	2-1	Halesowen Harriers
71	Gravesend & Northfleet	1-0	Hampton
74	Bashley	3-1	Havant Town
75	Felixstowe Town	2-0	Haverhill Rovers
77	Gorleston	0-2	Heybridge Swifts
79	Lancaster City	3-1	Ilkeston Town
82	Hayes	4-0	Leatherhead
88	Southwick	0-1	Molesey
90	Guisborough Town	3-4	Murton
102	Shoreham	2-0	Ramsgate
103	Westfields	2-3	Redditch United
111	Billingham Synthonia	2-0	Seaham Red Star
113	Netherfield	0-1	South Shields
121	Telford United	4-1	Tamworth
122	Weston Super Mare	3-2	Taunton Town
123	Wimborne Town	3-3	Thame United
130	Dorking	3-1	Uxbridge
137	Gainsborough Trinity	6-0	West Midlands Police
138	Dover Athletic	3-0	Whyteleafe

=== 2nd replays ===
Tie	Home team	Score	Away team
65	Glossop North End	3-5	Eastwood Town
123	Thame United	3-1	Wimborne Town

== 2nd qualifying round ==
=== Ties ===
Tie	Home team	Score	Away team
1	Ashford Town (Kent)	3-2	Burgess Hill Town
2	Atherstone United	3-4	Hednesford Town
3	Aylesbury United	2-0	Edgware Town
4	Barking	2-2	Baldock Town
5	Barnstaple Town	1-2	Newport A F C
6	Barrow	5-2	Billingham Synthonia
7	Bashley	3-0	Hungerford Town
8	Bishop Auckland	3-1	Gateshead
9	Blyth Spartans	3-2	Dunston Federation Brewery
10	Boston Town	1-2	Billericay Town
11	Boston United	3-0	Halstead Town
12	Braintree Town	2-1	Diss Town
13	Bromley	2-2	Gravesend & Northfleet
14	Burnham	0-1	Collier Row
15	Burscough	0-0	Congleton Town
16	Chadderton	1-2	Atherton Collieries
17	Chelmsford City	1-0	Witham Town
18	Chertsey Town	1-0	Shoreham
19	Chesham United	2-0	Dagenham & Redbridge
20	Cinderford Town	5-4	Elmore
21	Colwyn Bay	2-2	Hyde United
22	Croydon Athletic	1-2	Kingstonian
23	Desborough Town	0-2	Burton Albion
24	Dorchester Town	4-2	Newbury Town
25	Dorking	0-8	Carshalton Athletic
26	Durham City	1-0	Farsley Celtic
27	Eastwood Hanley	2-2	Hinckley Athletic
28	Emley	2-0	Radcliffe Borough
29	Enfield	3-1	Purfleet
30	Felixstowe Town	1-5	Heybridge Swifts
31	Folkestone Invicta	1-2	Worthing
32	Frickley Athletic	2-1	Matlock Town
33	Gainsborough Trinity	3-1	Redditch United
34	Gloucester City	7-1	Merthyr Tydfil
35	Gresley Rovers	4-0	Stourport Swifts
36	Guiseley	3-1	Atherton Laburnum Rovers
37	Halesowen Town	1-1	Telford United
38	Harrogate Town	1-0	Murton
39	Hastings Town	1-1	Tonbridge Angels
40	Hayes	1-2	Romford
41	Hendon	2-1	Wisbech Town
42	Hitchin Town	3-3	Tiptree United
43	Hornchurch	0-1	Ruislip Manor
44	Lancaster City	3-2	Maine Road
45	Lincoln United	3-2	Knowsley United
46	Margate	1-1	Peacehaven & Telscombe
47	Molesey	1-4	Dover Athletic
48	Morecambe	4-2	Chorley
49	Newport I O W	1-0	Buckingham Town
50	Northwich Victoria	10-0	Nantwich Town
51	Northwood	1-4	Dulwich Hamlet
52	Paget Rangers	2-1	Bridgnorth Town
53	Raunds Town	1-2	Moor Green
54	Rocester	0-4	Leek Town
55	Salisbury City	3-2	Poole Town
56	Solihull Borough	4-0	Blakenall
57	South Shields	2-2	Tow Law Town
58	Spennymoor United	3-2	Consett
59	St Albans City	11-1	Hillingdon Borough
60	Staines Town	5-3	Harrow Borough
61	Stevenage Borough	0-2	Cambridge City
62	Tiverton Town	4-2	Weston Super Mare
63	Torrington	1-5	Bideford
64	Trowbridge Town	4-1	Paulton Rovers
65	Walton & Hersham	3-0	Tooting & Mitcham United
66	Warrington Town	2-1	Sheffield
67	Waterlooville	4-0	Thame United
68	Welling United	1-4	Wembley
69	Whitby Town	6-1	Willington
70	Wokingham Town	3-0	Andover
71	Worksop Town	0-2	Eastwood Town
72	Yeading	8-0	Ware

=== Replays ===
Tie	Home team	Score	Away team
4	Baldock Town	3-2	Barking
13	Gravesend & Northfleet	1-1	Bromley
15	Congleton Town	3-3	Burscough
21	Hyde United	8-0	Colwyn Bay
27	Hinckley Athletic	0-1	Eastwood Hanley
37	Telford United	3-1	Halesowen Town
39	Tonbridge Angels	0-1	Hastings Town
42	Tiptree United	2-4	Hitchin Town
46	Peacehaven & Telscombe	3-5	Margate
57	Tow Law Town	2-1	South Shields

=== 2nd replays ===
Tie	Home team	Score	Away team
13	Gravesend & Northfleet	1-0	Bromley
15	Burscough	2-2	Congleton Town

=== 3rd replay ===
Tie	Home team	Score	Away team
15	Congleton Town	5-2	Burscough

== 3rd qualifying round ==
=== Ties ===
Tie	Home team	Score	Away team
1	Ashford Town (Kent)	2-1	Gravesend & Northfleet
2	Baldock Town	0-2	Aylesbury United
3	Bashley	1-1	Dorchester Town
4	Bideford	1-8	Tiverton Town
5	Billericay Town	1-1	Braintree Town
6	Blyth Spartans	3-1	Barrow
7	Chertsey Town	0-0	Dover Athletic
8	Cinderford Town	0-2	Gloucester City
9	Collier Row	0-1	Chesham United
10	Congleton Town	0-3	Morecambe
11	Eastwood Hanley	0-1	Burton Albion
12	Eastwood Town	1-1	Hyde United
13	Gainsborough Trinity	0-3	Telford United
14	Gresley Rovers	3-1	Leek Town
15	Guiseley	3-1	Atherton Collieries
16	Harrogate Town	0-3	Bishop Auckland
17	Hastings Town	2-2	Carshalton Athletic
18	Hendon	0-1	Chelmsford City
19	Heybridge Swifts	3-0	Boston United
20	Hitchin Town	3-3	Cambridge City
21	Lancaster City	5-1	Lincoln United
22	Margate	0-1	Kingstonian
23	Moor Green	4-1	Paget Rangers
24	Newport A F C	2-2	Trowbridge Town
25	Newport I O W	3-0	Wokingham Town
26	Northwich Victoria	2-1	Emley
27	Ruislip Manor	0-3	Enfield
28	Salisbury City	3-3	Waterlooville
29	Solihull Borough	3-0	Hednesford Town
30	St Albans City	1-0	Romford
31	Tow Law Town	0-0	Spennymoor United
32	Warrington Town	2-0	Frickley Athletic
33	Wembley	0-1	Walton & Hersham
34	Whitby Town	1-1	Durham City
35	Worthing	2-1	Dulwich Hamlet
36	Yeading	4-1	Staines Town

=== Replays ===
Tie	Home team	Score	Away team
3	Dorchester Town	0-2	Bashley
5	Braintree Town	3-3	Billericay Town
7	Dover Athletic	1-0	Chertsey Town
12	Hyde United	3-0	Eastwood Town
17	Carshalton Athletic	1-2	Hastings Town
20	Cambridge City	2-3	Hitchin Town
24	Trowbridge Town	1-1	Newport A F C
28	Waterlooville	0-1	Salisbury City
31	Spennymoor United	2-1	Tow Law Town
34	Durham City	3-1	Whitby Town

=== 2nd replays ===
Tie	Home team	Score	Away team
5	Billericay Town	2-3	Braintree Town
24	Trowbridge Town	3-1	Newport A F C

== 4th qualifying round ==
The teams that given byes to this round are Kettering Town, Southport, Macclesfield Town, Stafford Rangers, Altrincham, Halifax Town, Stalybridge Celtic, Bromsgrove Rovers, Yeovil Town, Farnborough Town, Slough Town, Witton Albion, Sutton United, Crawley Town, Marlow, Cheltenham Town, Accrington Stanley, Marine, V S Rugby and Nuneaton Borough.

=== Ties ===
Tie	Home team	Score	Away team
1	Accrington Stanley	0-1	Spennymoor United
2	Altrincham	2-1	Marine
3	Bishop Auckland	2-2	Macclesfield Town
4	Braintree Town	0-2	Gresley Rovers
5	Burton Albion	0-1	Hitchin Town
6	Cheltenham Town	1-1	Bashley
7	Chesham United	1-1	Bromsgrove Rovers
8	Dover Athletic	1-2	Kingstonian
9	Gloucester City	1-1	Worthing
10	Guiseley	6-0	Durham City
11	Halifax Town	3-1	Lancaster City
12	Hastings Town	1-1	Crawley Town
13	Hyde United	1-1	Warrington Town
14	Marlow	1-0	Sutton United
15	Moor Green	1-1	Aylesbury United
16	Morecambe	0-1	Witton Albion
17	Newport I O W	1-0	Trowbridge Town
18	Northwich Victoria	2-0	Blyth Spartans
19	Nuneaton Borough	2-2	Heybridge Swifts
20	Salisbury City	2-3	Ashford Town (Kent)
21	Solihull Borough	2-4	Kettering Town
22	Southport	2-1	Stalybridge Celtic
23	St Albans City	0-0	Enfield
24	Stafford Rangers	0-4	Slough Town
25	Tiverton Town	4-4	Farnborough Town
26	V S Rugby	0-0	Chelmsford City
27	Walton & Hersham	3-2	Yeovil Town
28	Yeading	1-0	Telford United

=== Replays ===
Tie	Home team	Score	Away team
3	Macclesfield Town	0-1	Bishop Auckland
6	Bashley	2-1	Cheltenham Town
7	Bromsgrove Rovers	0-1	Chesham United
9	Worthing	2-1	Gloucester City
12	Crawley Town	3-2	Hastings Town
13	Warrington Town	0-2	Hyde United
15	Aylesbury United	3-1	Moor Green
19	Heybridge Swifts	3-2	Nuneaton Borough
23	Enfield	4-2	St Albans City
25	Farnborough Town	1-5	Tiverton Town
26	Chelmsford City	2-1	V S Rugby

== 1994-95 FA Cup ==
See 1994-95 FA Cup for details of the rounds from the first round proper onwards.
