= 1986–87 FA Cup qualifying rounds =

1986-87 FA Cup qualifying rounds
Tournament details
- Country: England; Wales

The FA Cup 1986-87 is the 106th season of the world's oldest football knockout competition; The Football Association Challenge Cup, or FA Cup for short. The large number of clubs entering the tournament from lower down the English football league system meant that the competition started with a number of preliminary and qualifying rounds. The 28 victorious teams from the fourth round qualifying progressed to the first round proper.

== Preliminary round ==
=== Ties ===
Tie	Home team	Score	Away team
1	Accrington Stanley	0-1	Lancaster City
2	Alma Swanley	4-0	Southall
3	Alnwick Town	1-0	Guisborough Town
4	Andover	1-0	Sholing Sports
5	Arundel	0-0	Ringmer
6	Ashford Town (Kent)	1-0	Steyning Town
7	Ashington	3-2	Seaham Colliery Welfare Red Star
8	Ashton United	3-2	Ossett Albion
9	Aveley	0-1	Hornchurch
10	Barton Rovers	1-1	Saffron Walden Town
11	Basildon United	3-1	Potton United
12	Berkhamsted Town	1-1	Tiptree United
13	Billericay Town	0-2	Stowmarket Town
14	Bilston Town	1-2	Lye Town
15	Bootle	2-0	Belper Town
16	Boreham Wood	2-2	Egham Town
17	Bourne Town	0-2	Tamworth
18	Bridlington Town	2-0	Murton Colliery Welfare
19	Brigg Town	5-4	Arnold
20	Bristol Manor Farm	0-2	Evesham United
21	Brockenhurst	2-0	Westbury United
22	Burgess Hill Town	0-2	Staines Town
23	Burnham & Hillingdon	0-1	Rayners Lane
24	Burscough	2-0	Kirkby Town
25	Camberley Town	4-0	Shoreham
26	Chadderton	0-1	Irlam Town
27	Chatham Town	0-0	Vauxhall Motors
28	Chesham United	1-8	Metropolitan Police
29	Cheshunt	1-2	Rainham Town
30	Clandown	3-1	Abingdon Town
31	Clapton	0-1	Yeading
32	Clevedon Town	1-0	Paulton Rovers
33	Colwyn Bay	1-1	Rossendale United
34	Congleton Town	0-0	Bridgnorth Town
35	Consett	0-0	Annfield Plain
36	Coventry Sporting	3-1	Racing Club Warwick
37	Crockenhill	1-5	Feltham
38	Curzon Ashton	2-2	Armthorpe Welfare
39	Darwen	2-0	West Auckland Town
40	Desborough Town	1-1	Flackwell Heath
41	Devizes Town	1-1	Farnham Town
42	Dover Athletic	0-0	Tunbridge Wells
43	Durham City	2-1	Shildon
44	Eastbourne United	1-1	Portfield
45	Edgware	2-2	Corinthian Casuals
46	Epsom & Ewell	1-2	Three Bridges
47	Felixstowe Town	0-1	Ely City
48	Ferryhill Athletic	1-2	Darlington Cleveland Bridge
49	Fleetwood Town	2-0	Clitheroe
50	Formby	1-1	Droylsden
51	Gresley Rovers	0-1	Wolverton Town
52	Harwich & Parkeston	2-0	Collier Row
53	Havant Town	1-1	Radstock Town
54	Hemel Hempstead	2-2	Baldock Town
55	Highgate United	1-3	Banbury United
56	Hoddesdon Town	0-2	Great Yarmouth Town
57	Horndean	2-3	Woking
58	Horsham Y M C A	0-3	Haringey Borough
59	Ilkeston Town	1-3	Emley
60	Kingsbury Town	0-0	Erith & Belvedere
61	Lancing	4-0	Peacehaven & Telscombe
62	Langley Park Welfare	0-0	Evenwood Town
63	Leatherhead	1-1	Eastbourne Town
64	Leicester United	2-0	Friar Lane Old Boys
65	Maesteg Park	2-3	Llanelli
66	March Town United	1-1	Histon
67	Merstham	0-6	Leytonstone Ilford
68	Mile Oak Rovers	1-1	Leamington
69	Molesey	0-3	Wick
70	North Shields	3-1	Denaby United
71	Northallerton Town	0-4	Guiseley
72	Norton & Stockton Ancients	1-1	Newcastle Blue Star
73	Oldswinford	3-3	Boldmere St Michaels
74	Ottery St Mary	0-1	Merthyr Tydfil
75	Penrith	6-2	Glossop
76	Petersfield United	2-1	Hailsham Town
77	Radcliffe Borough	3-3	Eastwood Hanley
78	Redhill	3-2	Maidenhead United
79	Rothwell Town	3-2	Tividale
80	Royston Town	2-3	Finchley
81	Rushall Olympic	2-3	Moor Green
82	Ryhope Community Association	1-1	Farsley Celtic
83	Saltash United	0-0	Gloucester City
84	Sheppey United	2-1	Chichester City
85	Shortwood United	2-3	Melksham Town
86	Sittingbourne	1-1	Dorking
87	Soham Town Rangers	0-1	Hertford Town
88	Spalding United	0-0	Rushden Town
89	Stevenage Borough	3-2	Milton Keynes Borough
90	Sudbury Town	5-0	Gorleston
91	Sutton Town	6-2	Stalybridge Celtic
92	Thackley	1-0	Netherfield
93	Thanet United	0-2	Lewes
94	Tonbridge	2-0	Haywards Heath
95	Tring Town	1-3	Chertsey Town
96	Trowbridge Town	4-0	Hungerford Town
97	Walsall Wood	0-1	Skelmersdale United
98	Wellingborough Town	1-3	Sutton Coldfield Town
99	Welton Rovers	1-0	Taunton Town
100	Weston Super Mare	1-0	Torrington

=== Replays ===
Tie	Home team	Score	Away team
5	Ringmer	0-0	Arundel (0-3 when abandoned in extra time)
10	Saffron Walden Town	3-1	Barton Rovers
12	Tiptree United	2-1	Berkhamsted Town
16	Egham Town	1-3	Boreham Wood
27	Vauxhall Motors	0-2	Chatham Town
33	Rossendale United	3-2	Colwyn Bay
34	Bridgnorth Town	4-0	Congleton Town
35	Annfield Plain	3-1	Consett
38	Armthorpe Welfare	4-1	Curzon Ashton
40	Flackwell Heath	1-2	Desborough Town
41	Farnham Town	1-4	Devizes Town
42	Tunbridge Wells	1-2	Dover Athletic
44	Portfield	1-0	Eastbourne United
45	Corinthian Casuals	1-0	Edgware
50	Droylsden	3-1	Formby
53	Radstock Town	0-1	Havant Town
54	Baldock Town	1-0	Hemel Hempstead
60	Erith & Belvedere	1-0	Kingsbury Town
62	Evenwood Town	2-1	Langley Park Welfare
63	Eastbourne Town	3-1	Leatherhead
66	Histon	1-1	March Town United
68	Leamington	1-0	Mile Oak Rovers
72	Newcastle Blue Star	6-0	Norton & Stockton Ancients
73	Boldmere St Michaels	3-1	Oldswinford
77	Eastwood Hanley	1-0	Radcliffe Borough
82	Farsley Celtic	3-2	Ryhope Community Association
83	Gloucester City	0-2	Saltash United
86	Dorking	2-1	Sittingbourne
88	Rushden Town	2-4	Spalding United

=== 2nd replays ===
Tie	Home team	Score	Away team
5	Ringmer	0-3	Arundel
66	March Town United	3-2	Histon

== 1st qualifying round ==
=== Ties ===
Tie	Home team	Score	Away team
1	A F C Totton	1-0	Calne Town
2	Alfreton Town	0-0	Gainsborough Trinity
3	Alvechurch	1-1	Bedworth United
4	Annfield Plain	2-3	Alnwick Town
5	Armthorpe Welfare	2-1	Ashton United
6	Atherstone United	2-1	Moor Green
7	Aylesbury United	1-0	Barking
8	Baldock Town	1-0	Saffron Walden Town
9	Banbury United	4-2	Coventry Sporting
10	Barnet	0-2	Dulwich Hamlet
11	Barrow	0-3	Easington Colliery
12	Basildon United	0-2	Hornchurch
13	Basingstoke Town	0-5	Ton Pentre
14	Bedlington Terriers	1-2	Chester-Le-Street Town
15	Bishop Auckland	2-0	Gateshead
16	Blyth Spartans	1-1	Crook Town
17	Boldmere St Michaels	0-1	Rothwell Town
18	Bracknell Town	2-0	Croydon
19	Braintree Town	1-1	Cambridge City
20	Bridgnorth Town	1-1	Rossendale United
21	Bridlington Town	4-2	Ashington
22	Bridlington Trinity	1-1	Peterlee Newtown
23	Brigg Town	0-2	Lye Town
24	Brockenhurst	1-2	Havant Town
25	Bromley	2-2	Carshalton Athletic
26	Bromsgrove Rovers	2-0	Holbeach United
27	Buckingham Town	2-2	Dunstable
28	Burscough	2-2	Bootle
29	Buxton	1-0	Leek Town
30	Caernarfon Town	2-0	Marine
31	Camberley Town	0-1	Arundel
32	Canterbury City	0-1	Folkestone
33	Chalfont St Peter	0-3	Hayes
34	Chatham Town	1-2	Staines Town
35	Chatteris Town	2-2	Harlow Town
36	Cheltenham Town	3-4	Bideford
37	Chertsey Town	1-1	Leytonstone Ilford
38	Chippenham Town	3-1	Poole Town
39	Chorley	2-1	Horwich R M I
40	Corby Town	3-0	Irthlingborough Diamonds
41	Crawley Town	1-0	Gravesend & Northfleet
42	Devizes Town	5-2	Andover
43	Dorchester Town	1-1	Barry Town
44	Dudley Town	5-2	Arlesey Town
45	Eastleigh	1-1	Lewes
46	Ely City	1-4	Tiptree United
47	Eppleton Colliery Welfare	1-1	Brandon United
48	Evenwood Town	2-0	Darwen
49	Evesham United	1-1	Clevedon Town
50	Exmouth Town	5-0	Glastonbury
51	Fareham Town	2-1	Oxford City
52	Farsley Celtic	1-3	Newcastle Blue Star
53	Feltham	0-5	Metropolitan Police
54	Fisher Athletic	1-0	Harrow Borough
55	Fleetwood Town	2-0	Durham City
56	Forest Green Rovers	2-0	Yate Town
57	Frome Town	0-2	Redditch United
58	Goole Town	2-1	Scarborough
59	Gosport Borough	1-1	Newport I O W
60	Grantham	5-1	Wednesfield Social
61	Grays Athletic	6-1	Hitchin Town
62	Gretna	6-1	Horden Colliery Welfare
63	Halesowen Town	4-0	Ampthill Town
64	Harefield United	3-0	Corinthian Casuals
65	Haringey Borough	1-0	Three Bridges
66	Harrogate Town	4-1	Darlington Cleveland Bridge
67	Harwich & Parkeston	2-2	Stowmarket Town
68	Hastings Town	3-2	Horsham
69	Hendon	2-2	Banstead Athletic
70	Hinckley Athletic	0-1	Kidderminster Harriers
71	Hyde United	1-1	Rhyl
72	Irlam Town	1-1	Lancaster City
73	Kettering Town	2-1	Lowestoft Town
74	King's Lynn w/o-scr Haverhill Rovers		
75	Kingstonian	2-0	Cray Wanderers
76	Lancing	2-4	Woking
77	Letchworth Garden City	1-1	Burton Albion
78	Leyland Motors	0-2	Emley
79	Leyton Wingate	1-1	Faversham Town
80	Long Eaton United	1-4	Northwich Victoria
81	Matlock Town	1-3	Malvern Town
82	Minehead	1-0	Tiverton Town
83	Morecambe	8-0	Esh Winning
84	Mossley	3-3	Eastwood Town
85	Newbury Town	2-1	Petersfield United
86	Newmarket Town	2-0	Great Yarmouth Town
87	North Ferriby United	3-3	Leicester United
88	Oldbury United	0-0	Eastwood Hanley
89	Oswestry Town	1-0	Prescot Cables (tie awarded to Prescot Cables)
90	Portfield	1-7	Ashford Town (Kent)
91	R S Southampton	7-1	Littlehampton Town
92	Rayners Lane	2-5	Boreham Wood
93	Salisbury	2-1	Bridgend Town
94	Saltash United	1-0	Merthyr Tydfil
95	Sharpness	4-1	Llanelli
96	Shepshed Charterhouse	0-1	Stafford Rangers
97	Skelmersdale United	1-0	Sutton Town
98	South Bank	1-1	Billingham Town
99	South Liverpool	2-3	G K N Sankey
100	Southport	1-1	Garforth Town
101	Southwick	1-0	Hythe Town
102	St Albans City	1-2	Ruislip Manor
103	St Blazey	1-1	Barnstaple Town
104	St Helens Town	6-0	Heanor Town
105	Stamford	2-3	Bury Town
106	Stevenage Borough	1-0	Spalding United
107	Stourbridge	1-1	Abingdon United
108	Sudbury Town	4-1	Rainham Town
109	Sutton United	2-0	Hounslow
110	Tilbury	3-1	Witham Town
111	Tooting & Mitcham United	1-2	Hampton
112	Tow Law Town	0-2	Spennymoor United
113	Trowbridge Town	3-2	Melksham Town
114	Uxbridge	4-0	Desborough Town
115	Walthamstow Avenue	3-2	Heybridge Swifts
116	Walton & Hersham	2-2	Erith & Belvedere
117	Ware	5-2	Finchley
118	Warrington Town	0-2	Penrith
119	Waterlooville	0-1	Sheppey United
120	Welling United	6-0	Darenth Heathside
121	Wembley	1-0	Dorking
122	Weston Super Mare	1-0	Welton Rovers
123	Whitehawk	2-3	Eastbourne Town
124	Whitley Bay	2-3	North Shields
125	Whitstable Town	2-1	Tonbridge
126	Whyteleafe	0-2	Redhill
127	Wick	0-4	Dover Athletic
128	Wigston Fields	2-1	Leamington
129	Willenhall Town	1-0	Paget Rangers
130	Wimborne Town	2-2	Clandown
131	Winsford United	2-0	Droylsden
132	Wisbech Town	0-2	Sutton Coldfield Town
133	Witney Town	2-3	Mangotsfield United
134	Witton Albion	0-2	Hednesford Town
135	Wokingham Town	4-0	Marlow
136	Wolverton Town	0-0	Tamworth
137	Woodford Town	2-0	Hertford Town
138	Wootton Blue Cross	1-2	March Town United
139	Workington	2-1	Billingham Synthonia
140	Worksop Town	7-0	Armitage
141	Worthing	0-1	Herne Bay
142	Wren Rovers	3-1	Thackley
143	Yeading	4-4	Alma Swanley
144	Yorkshire Amateur	0-1	Guiseley

=== Replays ===
Tie	Home team	Score	Away team
2	Gainsborough Trinity	2-1	Alfreton Town
3	Bedworth United	1-0	Alvechurch
16	Crook Town	0-1	Blyth Spartans
19	Cambridge City	3-0	Braintree Town
20	Rossendale United	3-2	Bridgnorth Town
22	Peterlee Newtown	2-0	Bridlington Trinity
25	Carshalton Athletic	4-2	Bromley
27	Dunstable	1-2	Buckingham Town
28	Bootle	2-1	Burscough
35	Harlow Town	1-0	Chatteris Town
37	Leytonstone Ilford	0-1	Chertsey Town
43	Barry Town	3-4	Dorchester Town
45	Lewes	1-2	Eastleigh
47	Brandon United	2-1	Eppleton Colliery Welfare
49	Clevedon Town	2-1	Evesham United
59	Newport I O W	3-2	Gosport Borough
67	Stowmarket Town	1-3	Harwich & Parkeston
69	Banstead Athletic	0-1	Hendon
71	Rhyl	3-4	Hyde United
72	Lancaster City	2-1	Irlam Town
77	Burton Albion	5-1	Letchworth Garden City
79	Faversham Town	0-1	Leyton Wingate
84	Eastwood Town	1-1	Mossley
87	Leicester United	4-2	North Ferriby United
88	Eastwood Hanley	0-1	Oldbury United
98	Billingham Town	0-2	South Bank
100	Garforth Town	1-1	Southport (Abandoned in extra time)
103	Barnstaple Town	0-0	St Blazey
107	Abingdon United	0-0	Stourbridge
116	Erith & Belvedere	0-1	Walton & Hersham
130	Clandown	1-2	Wimborne Town
136	Tamworth	2-2	Wolverton Town
143	Alma Swanley	0-1	Yeading

=== 2nd replays ===
Tie	Home team	Score	Away team
84	Eastwood Town	2-0	Mossley
100	Southport	2-1	Garforth Town
103	St Blazey	0-2	Barnstaple Town
107	Stourbridge	2-1	Abingdon United
136	Tamworth	0-2	Wolverton Town

== 2nd qualifying round ==
=== Ties ===
Tie	Home team	Score	Away team
1	Alnwick Town	0-3	Easington Colliery
2	Armthorpe Welfare	1-1	St Helens Town
3	Arundel	1-3	Herne Bay
4	Ashford Town (Kent)	0-0	Southwick
5	Atherstone United	2-4	Stafford Rangers
6	Baldock Town	0-1	Bromsgrove Rovers
7	Banbury United	1-2	Malvern Town
8	Bootle	2-2	Eastwood Town
9	Boreham Wood	2-2	Kingstonian
10	Bridlington Town	0-1	Morecambe
11	Chertsey Town	0-1	Hendon
12	Clevedon Town	2-0	Mangotsfield United
13	Devizes Town	0-2	R S Southampton
14	Dover Athletic	2-1	Leyton Wingate
15	Eastbourne Town	0-1	Carshalton Athletic
16	Eastleigh	0-1	Crawley Town
17	Emley	2-2	Hyde United
18	Evenwood Town	0-5	Spennymoor United
19	Fleetwood Town	1-3	Gretna
20	Forest Green Rovers	4-2	Dorchester Town
21	Guiseley	0-2	Blyth Spartans
22	Halesowen Town	2-0	Burton Albion
23	Harefield United	2-2	Aylesbury United
24	Haringey Borough	4-2	Wokingham Town
25	Harrogate Town	1-1	Chester-Le-Street Town
26	Harwich & Parkeston	4-1	Walthamstow Avenue
27	Havant Town	1-1	A F C Totton
28	Hornchurch	1-1	King's Lynn
29	Lancaster City	1-1	Southport
30	Leicester United	0-1	Goole Town
31	Lye Town	4-1	G K N Sankey
32	March Town United	1-0	Bedworth United
33	Metropolitan Police	2-2	Hampton
34	Minehead	2-1	Barnstaple Town
35	Newbury Town	0-5	Fareham Town
36	Newcastle Blue Star	0-0	South Bank
37	Newmarket Town	1-2	Cambridge City
38	North Shields	0-0	Bishop Auckland
39	Oldbury United	3-1	Buxton
40	Penrith	1-2	Chorley
41	Redhill	2-4	Buckingham Town
42	Rossendale United	2-1	Prescot Cables
43	Rothwell Town	0-1	Grantham
44	Saltash United	1-2	Bideford
45	Sharpness	0-1	Ton Pentre
46	Sheppey United	1-1	Newport I O W
47	Skelmersdale United	2-1	Hednesford Town
48	Staines Town	0-0	Ruislip Manor
49	Stevenage Borough	2-0	Dudley Town
50	Stourbridge	2-1	Redditch United
51	Sudbury Town	0-2	Bury Town
52	Sutton Coldfield Town	0-1	Gainsborough Trinity
53	Tilbury	2-1	Harlow Town (Tilbury played suspended player - awarded to Harlow Town)
54	Tiptree United	0-3	Kettering Town
55	Trowbridge Town	2-0	Salisbury
56	Uxbridge	3-1	Hayes
57	Walton & Hersham	0-0	Fisher Athletic
58	Ware	1-2	Corby Town
59	Welling United	2-1	Bracknell Town
60	Wembley	2-1	Dulwich Hamlet
61	Weston Super Mare	2-3	Exmouth Town
62	Whitstable Town	2-1	Folkestone
63	Wigston Fields	0-1	Kidderminster Harriers
64	Wimborne Town	1-1	Chippenham Town
65	Winsford United	1-3	Caernarfon Town
66	Woking	4-0	Hastings Town
67	Wolverton Town	2-0	Willenhall Town
68	Woodford Town	2-1	Grays Athletic
69	Workington	0-0	Brandon United
70	Worksop Town	0-2	Northwich Victoria
71	Wren Rovers	2-2	Peterlee Newtown
72	Yeading	4-1	Sutton United

=== Replays ===
Tie	Home team	Score	Away team
2	St Helens Town	0-1	Armthorpe Welfare
4	Southwick	1-0	Ashford Town (Kent)
8	Eastwood Town	1-1	Bootle
9	Kingstonian	0-1	Boreham Wood
17	Hyde United	1-4	Emley
23	Aylesbury United	2-0	Harefield United
25	Chester-Le-Street Town	3-1	Harrogate Town
27	A F C Totton	1-0	Havant Town
28	King's Lynn	2-0	Hornchurch
29	Southport	3-1	Lancaster City
33	Hampton	2-0	Metropolitan Police
36	South Bank	1-2	Newcastle Blue Star
38	Bishop Auckland	4-2	North Shields
46	Newport I O W	1-0	Sheppey United
48	Ruislip Manor	0-2	Staines Town
57	Fisher Athletic	3-2	Walton & Hersham
64	Chippenham Town	0-1	Wimborne Town
69	Brandon United	0-1	Workington
71	Peterlee Newtown	2-0	Wren Rovers

=== 2nd replay ===
Tie	Home team	Score	Away team
8	Bootle	1-1	Eastwood Town

=== 3rd replay ===
Tie	Home team	Score	Away team
8	Eastwood Town	1-0	Bootle

== 3rd qualifying round ==
=== Ties ===
Tie	Home team	Score	Away team
1	A F C Totton	0-0	Wimborne Town
2	Armthorpe Welfare	0-2	Chorley
3	Bideford	2-1	Forest Green Rovers
4	Boreham Wood	0-1	Aylesbury United
5	Bromsgrove Rovers	1-0	March Town United
6	Bury Town	2-1	Harlow Town
7	Clevedon Town	0-4	Ton Pentre
8	Dover Athletic	3-3	Carshalton Athletic
9	Easington Colliery	1-1	Chester-Le-Street Town
10	Eastwood Town	1-4	Caernarfon Town
11	Exmouth Town	3-4	Minehead
12	Grantham	1-2	Gainsborough Trinity
13	Gretna	5-2	Blyth Spartans
14	Hampton	0-0	Fisher Athletic
15	Haringey Borough	1-2	Buckingham Town
16	Harwich & Parkeston	1-2	Woodford Town
17	Hendon	0-1	Welling United
18	Herne Bay	1-0	Whitstable Town
19	Kettering Town	2-0	Corby Town
20	King's Lynn	1-0	Cambridge City
21	Lye Town	1-3	Goole Town
22	Malvern Town	0-2	Kidderminster Harriers
23	Morecambe	1-2	Bishop Auckland
24	Newcastle Blue Star	1-1	Workington
25	R S Southampton	0-3	Fareham Town
26	Rossendale United	1-2	Oldbury United
27	Skelmersdale United	2-3	Northwich Victoria
28	Southport	3-3	Emley
29	Southwick	2-0	Newport I O W
30	Spennymoor United	1-0	Peterlee Newtown
31	Staines Town	1-1	Wembley
32	Stevenage Borough	1-3	Halesowen Town
33	Trowbridge Town	1-1	Stourbridge
34	Woking	3-1	Crawley Town
35	Wolverton Town	1-4	Stafford Rangers
36	Yeading	1-0	Uxbridge

=== Replays ===
Tie	Home team	Score	Away team
1	Wimborne Town	1-0	A F C Totton
8	Carshalton Athletic	1-3	Dover Athletic
9	Chester-Le-Street Town	5-3	Easington Colliery
14	Fisher Athletic	2-1	Hampton
24	Workington	0-1	Newcastle Blue Star
28	Emley	4-4	Southport
31	Wembley	4-1	Staines Town
33	Stourbridge	0-4	Trowbridge Town

=== 2nd replays ===
Tie	Home team	Score	Away team
28	Southport	2-0	Emley

== 4th qualifying round ==
The teams that given byes to this round are Enfield, Weymouth, Wealdstone, Bath City, Boston United, Maidstone United, Nuneaton Borough, Dagenham, Wycombe Wanderers, Dartford, Yeovil Town, Bishop's Stortford, Macclesfield, Windsor & Eton, Bognor Regis Town, Farnborough Town, Whitby Town, Chelmsford City, Slough Town and V S Rugby.

=== Ties ===
Tie	Home team	Score	Away team
1	Bath City	2-1	Yeovil Town
2	Bideford	0-2	Dartford
3	Bishop's Stortford	2-0	Fisher Athletic
4	Boston United	6-0	Gainsborough Trinity
5	Bromsgrove Rovers	2-0	Buckingham Town
6	Chelmsford City	2-1	Kidderminster Harriers
7	Chester-Le-Street Town	2-3	Caernarfon Town
8	Chorley	3-2	Bishop Auckland
9	Dagenham	0-3	Wealdstone
10	Enfield	1-1	Bury Town
11	Farnborough Town	4-0	Herne Bay
12	Goole Town	1-2	Nuneaton Borough
13	Halesowen Town	2-2	Oldbury United
14	Kettering Town	1-0	Windsor & Eton
15	King's Lynn	1-3	Woodford Town
16	Macclesfield Town	0-1	Southport
17	Northwich Victoria	0-1	Stafford Rangers
18	Slough Town	1-1	Dover Athletic
19	Southwick	1-1	Maidstone United
20	Spennymoor United	2-0	Gretna
21	Ton Pentre	5-1	Minehead
22	Trowbridge Town	0-0	Fareham Town
23	Wembley	2-3	Welling United
24	Whitby Town	2-0	Newcastle Blue Star
25	Wimborne Town	2-5	Bognor Regis Town
26	Woking	1-0	Weymouth
27	Wycombe Wanderers	1-5	V S Rugby
28	Yeading	1-3	Aylesbury United

=== Replays ===
Tie	Home team	Score	Away team
10	Bury Town	0-1	Enfield
13	Oldbury United	1-2	Halesowen Town
18	Dover Athletic	2-3	Slough Town
19	Maidstone United	1-1	Southwick
22	Fareham Town	4-1	Trowbridge Town

=== 2nd replay ===
Tie	Home team	Score	Away team
19	Maidstone United	2-2	Southwick

=== 3rd replay ===
Tie	Home team	Score	Away team
19	Southwick	1-5	Maidstone United

== 1986-87 FA Cup ==
See 1986-87 FA Cup for details of the rounds from the first round proper onwards.
