= 1988–89 FA Cup qualifying rounds =

Tournament details
- Country: England; Wales

The FA Cup 1988–89 is the 108th season of the world's oldest football knockout competition; The Football Association Challenge Cup, or FA Cup for short. The large number of clubs entering the tournament from lower down the English football league system meant that the competition started with a number of preliminary and qualifying rounds. The 28 victorious teams from the fourth round qualifying progressed to the first round proper.

== Preliminary round ==
=== Ties ===
Tie	Home team	Score	Away team
1	Abingdon United	4–2	Havant Town
2	Annfield Plain	1–0	Denaby United
3	Arlesey Town	1–1	Hoddesdon Town
4	Armthorpe Welfare	3–1	Darlington Cleveland Bridge
5	Arnold	1–0	Bootle (match played at Bootle)
6	Ashington	2–4	Rossendale United
7	Aveley	2–2	Halstead Town
8	Barkingside	1–2	Uxbridge
9	Basildon United	2–4	Braintree Town
10	Berkhamsted Town	2–2	March Town United
11	Bideford	1–1	Shortwood United
12	Billericay Town	0–1	Haverhill Rovers
13	Bilston Town	4–0	Alfreton Town
14	Boston	2–0	Sutton Town
15	Bourne Town	1–1	Baker Perkins
16	Brackley Town	1–0	Spalding United
17	Bristol Manor Farm	0–1	Barry Town
18	Burgess Hill Town	2–1	Harefield United
19	Calne Town	0–1	Thatcham Town
20	Canvey Island	2–3	Stowmarket Town
21	Chatham Town	1–5	Dorking
22	Chatteris Town	2–2	Racing Club Warwick
23	Chesham United	1–1	Hornchurch
24	Chichester City	2–1	Petersfield United
25	Chippenham Town	4–0	Andover
26	Clandown	0–2	Yate Town
27	Cleator Moor Celtic	0–0	Bridlington Town
28	Clitheroe	2–2	Lancaster City
29	Collier Row	0–3	Rainham Town
30	Corinthian	2–1	Wick
31	Corinthian-Casuals	0–4	Hanwell Town (match played at Hanwell Town)
32	Cray Wanderers	1–4	Tilbury
33	Crook Town	0–4	Ferryhill Athletic
34	Cwmbran Town	2–2	Radstock Town (match played at Radstock Town)
35	Darenth Heathside	0–1	Hertford Town
36	Desborough Town	2–2	Witney Town
37	Devizes Town	3–2	Sholing Sports
38	Durham City	1–2	Guiseley
39	Edgware Town	1–4	Hitchin Town
40	Emley	4–1	Langley Park Welfare
41	Esh Winining	1–1	Ryhope Community Association
42	Evenwood Town	2–0	Bedlington Terriers
43	Evesham United	3–0	King's Lynn
44	Farsley Celtic	2–2	Netherfield
45	Felixstowe Town	1–1	Baldock Town
46	Feltham	1–1	Hythe Town
47	Finchley	1–0	Wootton Blue Cross
48	Flackwell Heath	3–2	Camberley Town
49	Folkestone	2–0	Ringmer
50	Formby	0–7	Congleton Town
51	Frome Town	4–1	St Blazey
52	Glossop	0–0	Prescot Cables
53	Grantham	2–1	Borrowash Victoria
54	Gravesend & Northfleet	2–1	Tunbridge Wells
55	Gresley Rovers	2–0	Paget Rangers
56	Hailsham Town	0–0	Ruislip Manor
57	Harrisons	0–2	Dudley Town
58	Harworth C I	0–0	Belper Town
59	Hednesford Town	1–3	Eastwood Town
60	Heybridge Swifts	3–1	Gorleston
61	Highgate United	0–4	Rushden Town
62	Hinckley Athletic	3–0	Winsford United
63	Hinckley Town	2–0	Stourbridge
64	Histon	0–1	Wisbech Town
65	Holbeach United	1–4	Banbury United
66	Horndean	2–3	Banstead Athletic
67	Hungerford Town	0–0	Eastleigh
68	Irlam Town	3–1	Oakham United
69	Kempston Rovers	0–1	Beckenham Town
70	Leatherhead	1–1	Hounslow
71	Leek Town	3–0	Heanor Town
72	Leighton Town	2–0	Wolverton Town (M K)
73	Leyland Motors	0–1	Bridlington Trinity
74	Long Eaton United	0–5	Bridgnorth Town
75	Merstham	3–3	Clapton
76	Minehead	0–4	Sharpness
77	Molesey	7–0	Herne Bay
78	Northampton Spencer	0–1	Irthlingborough Diamonds
79	Norton & Stockton Ancients	1–0	Darwen
80	Ossett Albion	2–2	Northallerton Town
81	Oxford City scr-w/o Pagham		
82	Paulton Rovers	2–1	Barnstaple Town
83	Peacehaven & Telscombe	0–1	Ramsgate
84	Peterlee Newtown	1–2	Droylsden
85	Potton United	2–0	Welwyn Garden City
86	Purfleet	0–1	Metropolitan Police
87	Radcliffe Borough	2–1	Ilkeston Town
88	Redhill	0–1	Malden Vale
89	Rothwell Town	1–5	Mile Oak Rovers
90	Ruislip	2–0	Crockenhill
91	Saffron Walden Town	2–0	Ely City
92	Salisbury	4–2	Newbury Town
93	Sheppey United	1–1	Maidenhead United
94	Shildon	6–2	Willington
95	Shoreham	1–3	Eastbourne United
96	Sittingbourne	2–3	Hastings Town
97	Soham Town Rangers	0–1	Watton United
98	St Helens Town	0–1	Ashton United
99	Staines Town	3–0	Newmarket Town
100	Stevenage Borough	6–1	Rayners Lane
101	Stockton	1–1	Harrogate Town
102	Taunton Town	1–1	Poole Town
103	Thetford Town	2–2	Harlow Town
104	Tiptree United	1–1	Dunstable
105	Tiverton Town	7–2	Bridgend Town
106	Tividale	1–4	Rushall Olympic
107	Tonbridge	2–3	Canterbury City
108	Trowbridge Town	2–0	Romsey Town
109	Walsall Wood	0–0	Louth United
110	Ware	2–0	Lowestoft Town
111	Warrington Town	3–2	Curzon Ashton
112	Wednesfield Social	2–3	Chasetown
113	Welton Rovers	0–3	Exmouth Town
114	West Auckland Town	0–0	South Bank
115	Whitehawk	2–0	Lancing
116	Whyteleafe	6–0	Arundel
117	Wivenhoe Town	3–0	Clacton Town
118	Workington	1–1	Murton
119	Wren Rovers	0–3	Whitley Bay
120	Yeading	2–3	Haywards Heath

=== Replays ===
Tie	Home team	Score	Away team
3	Hoddesdon Town	1–3	Arlesey Town
7	Halstead Town	3–3	Aveley (abandoned in extra time)
10	March Town United	4–2	Berkhamsted Town
11	Shortwood United	2–1	Bideford
15	Baker Perkins	0–1	Bourne Town
23	Hornchurch	5–6	Chesham United
27	Bridlington Town	4–1	Cleator Moor Celtic
28	Lancaster City	1–0	Clitheroe
34	Radstock Town	1–0	Cwmbran Town
36	Witney Town	1–0	Desborough Town
41	Ryhope Community Association	2–3	Esh Winning
44	Netherfield	0–3	Farsley Celtic
45	Baldock Town	4–0	Felixstowe Town
46	Hythe Town	2–5	Feltham
52	Prescot Cables	1–0	Glossop
56	Ruislip Manor	0–2	Hailsham Town
58	Belper Town	1–5	Harworth C I
67	Eastleigh	0–1	Hungerford Town
70	Hounslow	2–1	Leatherhead
75	Clapton	2–1	Merstham
80	Northallerton Town	2–1	Ossett Albion
93	Maidenhead United	0–1	Sheppey United
101	Harrogate Town	2–1	Stockton
102	Poole Town	1–0	Taunton Town
103	Harlow Town	4–1	Thetford Town
104	Dunstable	1–1	Tiptree United
109	Louth United	1–3	Walsall Wood
114	South Bank	2–0	West Auckland Town
118	Murton	2–4	Workington

=== 2nd replays ===
Tie	Home team	Score	Away team
7	Aveley	1–4	Halstead Town
104	Tiptree United	0–0	Dunstable

=== 3rd replay ===
Tie	Home team	Score	Away team
104	Dunstable	0–1	Tiptree United

== 1st qualifying round ==
=== Ties ===
Tie	Home team	Score	Away team
1	Abingdon United	1–2	Hungerford Town
2	Armthorpe Welfare	2–2	Fleetwood Town
3	Ashford Town (Kent)	2–1	Dorking
4	Atherstone United	4–0	Wisbech Town
5	Bangor City	2–2	Irlam Town
6	Banstead Athletic	0–2	Windsor & Eton
7	Barking	0–0	Beckenham Town
8	Barnet	7–0	Epsom & Ewell
9	Barrow	3–1	Lancaster City
10	Barry Town	0–2	Worcester City
11	Barton Rovers	1–0	Saffron Walden Town
12	Basingstoke Town	3–1	Abingdon Town
13	Bedworth United	1–1	Bourne Town
14	Billingham Town	1–0	Guiseley
15	Bilston Town	0–0	Warrington Town
16	Bishop Auckland	4–0	Evenwood Town
17	Bishop's Stortford	3–1	Heybridge Swifts
18	Blyth Spartans	1–0	Rossendale United
19	Boreham Wood	2–0	Hitchin Town
20	Boston United	8–1	Coventry Sporting
21	Brackley Town	1–2	Rushall Olympic
22	Bracknell Town	1–2	Whitehawk
23	Braintree Town	2–0	Corby Town
24	Brandon United	2–0	Annfield Plain
25	Bromsgrove Rovers	1–1	Chalfont St Peter
26	Buckingham Town	0–3	Finchley
27	Burnham	2–2	Rainham Town
28	Burscough	0–1	Emley
29	Bury Town	0–0	Wivenhoe Town
30	Cambridge City	5–1	Potton United
31	Carshalton Athletic	3–1	Lewes
32	Chard Town	0–3	Poole Town
33	Chertsey Town	0–0	Feltham
34	Clapton	0–1	Leytonstone Ilford
35	Clevedon Town	1–2	Tiverton Town
36	Colwyn Bay	0–0	Ashton United
37	Congleton Town	1–1	Harworth C I
38	Crawley Town	2–1	Hailsham Town
39	Croydon	1–2	Hastings Town
40	Dartford	7–1	Flackwell Heath
41	Dorchester Town	3–1	Frome Town
42	Dover Athletic	2–0	Egham Town
43	Dulwich Hamlet	1–0	Three Bridges
44	Eastwood Hanley	2–0	Prescot Cables
45	Eastwood Town	3–1	Brigg Town
46	Erith & Belvedere	0–1	Hanwell Town
47	Esh Winning	1–1	Farsley Celtic
48	Falmouth Town	3–0	Glastonbury
49	Fareham Town	3–0	Chichester City
50	Forest Green Rovers	5–0	Devizes Town
51	Frickley Athletic	2–1	Boldmere St Michaels
52	Gainsborough Trinity	2–2	Gresley Rovers
53	Gravesend & Northfleet	1–3	Hertford Town
54	Grays Athletic	5–0	Tiptree United
55	Great Yarmouth Town	3–0	Milton Keynes Borough
56	Gretna	5–0	Chester-le-Street Town
57	Guisborough Town	3–0	Alnwick Town
58	Harrogate Town	1–3	Billingham Synthonia
59	Hayes	1–0	Chesham United
60	Haywards Heath	3–2	Eastbourne United
61	Hemel Hempstead	5–1	Baldock Town
62	Hendon	5–1	Harwich & Parkeston
63	Hinckley Athletic	1–3	Buxton
64	Horden Colliery Welfare	0–2	Ferryhill Athletic
65	Horsham	1–5	Walton & Hersham
66	Horsham Y M C A	1–2	Molesey
67	Horwich R M I	3–3	Droylsden
68	Irthlingborough Diamonds	1–1	Moor Green
69	Kingstonian	4–1	Folkestone
70	Leatherhead	1–0	Stowmarket Town
71	Leicester United	4–1	Rushden Town
72	Leighton Town	0–0	Banbury United
73	Letchworth Garden City	1–2	Cheshunt
74	Leyton Wingate	1–1	Hampton
75	Lye Town	0–3	Hinckley Town
76	Maesteg Park	1–0	Shortwood United
77	Mangotsfield United	6–0	Torrington
78	March Town United	1–2	Alvechurch
79	Marine	5–0	Thackley
80	Matlock Town	2–3	Walsall Wood
81	Melksham Town	0–5	Gloucester City
82	Merthyr Tydfil	3–0	Sharpness
83	Metropolitan Police	1–1	Arlesey Town
84	Mile Oak Rovers	3–1	Goole Town
85	Morecambe	3–3	Skelmersdale United
86	Mossley	2–0	Bridgnorth Town
87	Newcastle Blue Star	4–0	Norton & Stockton Ancients
88	Newport I O W	1–1	Bashley
89	North Ferriby United	3–2	Grantham
90	North Shields	1–1	Bridlington Town
91	Northallerton Town	2–0	Easington Colliery
92	Northwich Victoria	5–0	Arnold
93	Nuneaton Borough	2–0	Stamford
94	Oldbury United	2–3	Dudley Town
95	Paulton Rovers	1–4	Saltash United
96	Radcliffe Borough	0–2	Hyde United
97	Radstock Town	0–2	Cheltenham Town
98	Ramsgate	0–2	Fisher Athletic
99	Redditch United	2–1	Evesham United
100	Rhyl	4–1	Ashtree Highfield
101	Royston Town	0–1	Stevenage Borough
102	Ruislip	1–1	Marlow
103	Salisbury	2–3	Pagham
104	Seaham Red Star	0–0	Accrington Stanley
105	Sheppey United	1–4	Bromley
106	Shepshed Charterhouse	3–2	Witney Town
107	Shildon	1–5	Whitley Bay
108	Shotton Comrades	1–1	South Bank
109	South Liverpool	1–1	Leek Town
110	Southport	1–0	Penrith
111	Southwick	5–0	Littlehampton Town
112	Spennymoor United	3–0	Bridlington Trinity
113	St Albans City	1–0	Malden Vale
114	Stafford Rangers	2–0	Halesowen Harriers
115	Staines Town	2–0	Harrow Borough
116	Stalybridge Celtic	1–4	Chadderton
117	Steyning Town	5–1	Corinthian
118	Sudbury Town	3–1	Harlow Town
119	Swanage Town & Herston	2–1	Yate Town
120	Tamworth	3–0	Racing Club Warwick
121	Thame United	3–1	Westbury United
122	Thanet United	1–0	Portfield
123	Thatcham Town	1–3	Gosport Borough
124	Ton Pentre	0–1	Exmouth Town
125	Tow Law Town	2–0	Consett
126	Tring Town	2–1	Tilbury
127	Trowbridge Town	1–2	Weymouth
128	Uxbridge	0–2	Halstead Town
129	Ware	0–3	Kettering Town
130	Waterlooville	2–0	Chippenham Town
131	Wealdstone	2–1	Vauxhall Motors (Luton)
132	Wellingborough Town	1–2	Chasetown
133	Wembley	3–1	Burgess Hill Town
134	Whyteleafe	2–1	Tooting & Mitcham United
135	Willenhall Town	3–3	Malvern Town
136	Wimborne Town	3–5	Weston-super-Mare
137	Witham Town	2–1	Watton United
138	Witton Albion	0–0	Boston
139	Woking	3–0	Canterbury City
140	Wokingham Town	2–1	Kingsbury Town
141	Workington	0–0	Gateshead
142	Worksop Town	1–2	Sutton Coldfield Town
143	Worthing	3–2	A F C Totton
144	Wycombe Wanderers	4–1	Haverhill Rovers

=== Replays ===
Tie	Home team	Score	Away team
2	Fleetwood Town	5–0	Armthorpe Welfare
5	Irlam Town	1–4	Bangor City
7	Beckenham Town	0–1	Barking
13	Bourne Town	3–4	Bedworth United
15	Warrington Town	3–2	Bilston Town
25	Chalfont St Peter	0–3	Bromsgrove Rovers
27	Rainham Town	1–1	Burnham
29	Wivenhoe Town	0–2	Bury Town
33	Feltham	1–0	Chertsey Town
36	Ashton United	2–1	Colwyn Bay
37	Harworth C I	1–0	Congleton Town
47	Gresley Rovers	3–1	Gainsborough Trinity
52	Droylsden	1–2	Horwich R M I
67	Moor Green	4–3	Irthlingborough Diamonds
68	Banbury United	2–1	Leighton Town
72	Hampton	0–1	Leyton Wingate
74	Arlesey Town	2–0	Metropolitan Police
83	Skelmersdale United	1–2	Morecambe
85	Farsley Celtic	0–3	Netherfield
88	Bashley	1–0	Newport I O W
90	Bridlington Town	1–1	North Shields
102	Marlow	3–0	Ruislip
104	Accrington Stanley	3–1	Seaham Red Star
108	South Bank	3–1	Shotton Comrades
109	Leek Town	2–1	South Liverpool
135	Malvern Town	0–0	Willenhall Town
138	Boston	0–2	Witton Albion
141	Gateshead	1–0	Workington

=== 2nd replays ===
Tie	Home team	Score	Away team
27	Burnham	3–1	Rainham Town
90	North Shields	1–2	Bridlington Town
135	Willenhall Town	0–2	Malvern Town

== 2nd qualifying round ==
=== Ties ===
Tie	Home team	Score	Away team
1	Accrington Stanley	1–1	Billingham Synthonia
2	Ashford Town (Kent)	2–1	Hastings Town
3	Ashton United	1–3	Bangor City
4	Barnet	4–3	Leatherhead
5	Barton Rovers	1–3	Bedworth United
6	Bashley	4–3	Pagham
7	Billingham Town	2–1	Newcastle Blue Star
8	Boreham Wood	0–0	Bury Town
9	Boston United	5–0	Mile Oak Rovers
10	Brandon United	4–2	Blyth Spartans
11	Bridlington Town	2–1	Bishop Auckland
12	Bromsgrove Rovers	2–2	Alvechurch
13	Carshalton Athletic	1–1	Bromley
14	Chadderton	1–5	Hyde United
15	Chasetown	0–1	Tamworth
16	Cheshunt	1–2	Staines Town
17	Dartford	1–1	St Albans City
18	Dover Athletic	5–2	Haywards Heath
19	Dudley Town	2–1	Walsall Wood
20	Dulwich Hamlet	1–0	Marlow
21	Eastwood Hanley	0–1	Northwich Victoria
22	Emley	5–0	Horwich R M I
23	Falmouth Town	2–2	Saltash United
24	Fareham Town	3–0	Basingstoke Town
25	Feltham	0–0	Kingstonian
26	Ferryhill Athletic	0–2	Spennymoor United
27	Finchley	0–3	Wycombe Wanderers
28	Frickley Athletic	1–0	Buxton
29	Gloucester City	3–0	Cheltenham Town
30	Grays Athletic	1–1	Barking
31	Great Yarmouth Town	0–3	Kettering Town
32	Gretna	1–1	Whitley Bay
33	Guisborough Town	0–0	Farsley Celtic
34	Hanwell Town	0–1	Wembley
35	Hemel Hempstead	2–3	Hayes
36	Hendon	3–1	Braintree Town
37	Hinckley Town	1–0	Gresley Rovers
38	Hungerford Town	0–2	Waterlooville
39	Leek Town	2–0	Mossley
40	Leicester United	1–0	Shepshed Charterhouse
41	Leyton Wingate	7–1	Halstead Town
42	Maesteg Park	0–2	Dorchester Town
43	Malvern Town	0–2	Moor Green
44	Mangotsfield United	0–1	Worcester City
45	Marine	2–4	Fleetwood Town
46	Molesey	1–1	Woking
47	Morecambe	3–2	Northallerton Town
48	North Ferriby United	2–2	Witton Albion
49	Nuneaton Borough	1–1	Banbury United
50	Poole Town	2–4	Forest Green Rovers
51	Redditch United	2–1	Atherstone United
52	Rhyl	1–1	Warrington Town
53	South Bank	0–0	Barrow
54	Southport	2–0	Harworth C I
55	Southwick	0–1	Whyteleafe
56	Stafford Rangers	1–0	Rushall Olympic
57	Stevenage Borough	3–2	Burnham (Stevenage played ineligible player, awarded to Burnham)
58	Steyning Town	1–3	Whitehawk
59	Sudbury Town	2–1	Cambridge City
60	Sutton Coldfield Town	1–0	Eastwood Town
61	Swanage Town & Herston	1–1	Exmouth Town
62	Thame United	1–3	Gosport Borough
63	Thanet United	1–3	Fisher Athletic
64	Tiverton Town	0–1	Merthyr Tydfil
65	Tow Law Town	3–2	Gateshead
66	Tring Town	1–2	Crawley Town
67	Walton & Hersham	3–2	Leytonstone Ilford
68	Wealdstone	1–0	Arlesey Town
69	Weston-super-Mare	0–1	Weymouth
70	Witham Town	2–3	Bishop's Stortford
71	Wokingham Town	3–1	Hertford Town
72	Worthing	0–4	Windsor & Eton

=== Replays ===
Tie	Home team	Score	Away team
1	Billingham Synthonia	5–1	Accrington Stanley
8	Bury Town	1–4	Boreham Wood
12	Alvechurch	3–3	Bromsgrove Rovers
13	Bromley	4–2	Carshalton Athletic
17	St Albans City	2–4	Dartford
23	Saltash United	5–0	Falmouth Town
25	Kingstonian	3–0	Feltham
30	Barking	0–3	Grays Athletic
32	Whitley Bay	1–0	Gretna
33	Farsley Celtic	0–1	Guisborough Town
46	Woking	1–0	Molesey
48	Witton Albion	3–1	North Ferriby United
49	Banbury United	1–0	Nuneaton Borough
52	Warrington Town	2–0	Rhyl
53	Barrow	1–0	South Bank
61	Exmouth Town	3–0	Swanage Town & Herston

=== 2nd replays ===
Tie	Home team	Score	Away team
12	Bromsgrove Rovers	2–0	Alvechurch

== 3rd qualifying round ==
=== Ties ===
Tie	Home team	Score	Away team
1	Banbury United	2–3	Redditch United
2	Barnet	0–1	Grays Athletic
3	Bashley	1–2	Fareham Town
4	Billingham Synthonia	3–0	Billingham Town
5	Boston United	3–4	Hinckley Town
6	Bromley	2–2	Crawley Town
7	Bromsgrove Rovers	3–1	Bedworth United
8	Dover Athletic	3–0	Ashford Town (Kent)
9	Dulwich Hamlet	1–1	Burnham
10	Fisher Athletic	1–1	Kingstonian
11	Fleetwood Town	2–2	Emley
12	Frickley Athletic	3–1	Witton Albion
13	Gloucester City	0–1	Merthyr Tydfil
14	Gosport Borough	0–1	Waterlooville
15	Guisborough Town	1–1	Bridlington Town
16	Hendon	5–3	Bishop's Stortford
17	Hyde United	1–1	Northwich Victoria
18	Kettering Town	4–0	Boreham Wood
19	Leyton Wingate	1–2	Sudbury Town
20	Moor Green	1–1	Tamworth
21	Morecambe	0–0	Barrow
22	Saltash United	2–2	Exmouth Town
23	Southport	3–0	Bangor City
24	Stafford Rangers	1–1	Leicester United
25	Staines Town	0–1	Wycombe Wanderers
26	Sutton Coldfield Town	0–1	Dudley Town
27	Tow Law Town	2–2	Spennymoor United
28	Walton & Hersham	2–1	Wembley
29	Warrington Town	1–2	Leek Town
30	Wealdstone	1–2	Hayes
31	Weymouth	3–0	Forest Green Rovers
32	Whitley Bay	0–1	Brandon United
33	Whyteleafe	0–2	Woking
34	Windsor & Eton	1–1	Whitehawk
35	Wokingham Town	1–2	Dartford
36	Worcester City	1–1	Dorchester Town

=== Replays ===
Tie	Home team	Score	Away team
6	Crawley Town	1–0	Bromley
9	Burnham	2–3	Dulwich Hamlet
10	Kingstonian	1–4	Fisher Athletic
11	Emley	2–2	Fleetwood Town
15	Bridlington Town	0–1	Guisborough Town
17	Northwich Victoria	3–0	Hyde United
20	Tamworth	4–6	Moor Green
21	Barrow	5–1	Morecambe
22	Exmouth Town	4–3	Saltash United
24	Leicester United	2–3	Stafford Rangers
27	Spennymoor United	2–2	Tow Law Town
34	Whitehawk	1–0	Windsor & Eton
36	Dorchester Town	1–2	Worcester City

=== 2nd replays ===
Tie	Home team	Score	Away team
11	Fleetwood Town	3–1	Emley
27	Spennymoor United	2–1	Tow Law Town

== 4th qualifying round ==
The teams that given byes to this round are Newport County, Runcorn, Kidderminster Harriers, Sutton United, Macclesfield Town, Altrincham, Welling United, Aylesbury United, Chorley, Yeovil Town, Dagenham, Bognor Regis Town, Farnborough Town, Whitby Town, Chelmsford City, Slough Town, V S Rugby, Caernarfon Town, Burton Albion and Halesowen Town.

=== Ties ===
Tie	Home team	Score	Away team
1	Aylesbury United	1–1	Sudbury Town
2	Barrow	1–1	Whitby Town
3	Bognor Regis Town	2–2	Whitehawk
4	Bromsgrove Rovers	2–0	Moor Green
5	Caernarfon Town	1–1	Brandon United
6	Chelmsford City	1–3	Halesowen Town
7	Crawley Town	3–3	Merthyr Tydfil
8	Dagenham	2–0	Burton Albion
9	Dudley Town	3–3	Grays Athletic
10	Exmouth Town	1–5	Woking
11	Fareham Town	1–1	Dover Athletic
12	Farnborough Town	2–3	Waterlooville
13	Fisher Athletic	3–3	Dulwich Hamlet
14	Fleetwood Town	1–3	Runcorn
15	Frickley Athletic	1–1	Chorley
16	Hayes	1–0	Redditch United
17	Leek Town	0–0	Guisborough Town
18	Macclesfield Town	0–0	Altrincham
19	Newport County	2–1	Weymouth
20	Northwich Victoria	2–0	Billingham Synthonia
21	Slough Town	1–2	Dartford
22	Southport	2–1	Tow Law Town
23	Stafford Rangers	2–1	Kidderminster Harriers
24	Sutton United	1–1	Walton & Hersham
25	V S Rugby	1–1	Hendon
26	Welling United	1–1	Hinckley Town
27	Worcester City	1–2	Yeovil Town
28	Wycombe Wanderers	1–2	Kettering Town

=== Replays ===
Tie	Home team	Score	Away team
1	Sudbury Town	0–1	Aylesbury United
2	Whitby Town	1–3	Barrow
3	Whitehawk	0–2	Bognor Regis Town
5	Brandon United	2–0	Caernarfon Town
7	Merthyr Tydfil	3–1	Crawley Town
9	Grays Athletic	2–0	Dudley Town
11	Dover Athletic	0–1	Fareham Town
13	Dulwich Hamlet	0–3	Fisher Athletic
15	Chorley	0–1	Frickley Athletic
17	Guisborough Town	0–0	Leek Town
18	Altrincham	4–0	Macclesfield Town
24	Walton & Hersham	0–3	Sutton United
25	Hendon	2–0	V S Rugby
26	Hinckley Town	0–3	Welling United

=== 2nd replays ===
Tie	Home team	Score	Away team
17	Guisborough Town	1–0	Leek Town

== 1988–89 FA Cup ==
See 1988-89 FA Cup for details of the rounds from the first round proper onwards.
