= 1961–62 Yorkshire Football League =

The 1961–62 Yorkshire Football League was the 36th season in the history of the Yorkshire Football League, a football competition in England. This season Division Three was formed. It was made of reserve sides of eight league clubs plus Leeds United 'A'.

== Division One ==
Yorkshire Football League Division One
- Season: 1961–62
- Champions: Stocksbridge Works
- Relegated: Swillington Miners Welfare; Frickley Colliery reserves Ossett Town
- Matches played: 240
- Goals scored: 934 (3.89 per match)

Division One featured 12 clubs which competed in the previous season, along with four new clubs, promoted from Division Two:

- Goole Town reserves
- Hallam
- Harrogate Town
- Swillington Miners Welfare

=== League table ===
Pos	Team	Pld	W	D	L	GF	GA	GR	Pts	Qualification or relegation
1	Stocksbridge Works	30	22	4	4	90	28	3.214	48	
2	Ossett Albion	30	21	5	4	84	40	2.100	47	
3	Bridlington Town	30	19	7	4	61	25	2.440	45	
4	Farsley Celtic	30	15	5	10	40	35	1.143	35	
5	Yorkshire Amateur	30	14	5	11	69	58	1.190	33	
6	Harrogate Town	30	13	6	11	56	45	1.244	32	
7	Norton Woodseats	30	14	3	13	59	59	1.000	31	
8	Hallam	30	12	5	13	65	59	1.102	29	
9	Selby Town	30	12	5	13	51	53	0.962	29	
10	East End Park	30	9	9	12	45	55	0.818	27	Resigned from the league
11	Scarborough reserves	30	12	2	16	66	76	0.868	26	
12	Goole Town reserves	30	10	5	15	55	66	0.833	25	
13	Grimethorpe Miners Welfare	30	9	6	15	60	86	0.698	24	
14	Swillington Miners Welfare	30	7	7	16	59	85	0.694	21	Relegated to Division Two
15	Frickley Colliery reserves	30	5	8	17	35	65	0.538	18	Relegated to Division Two
16	Ossett Town	30	4	2	24	39	99	0.394	10	Relegated to Division Two

Source: fchd
Rules for classification: 1) points; 2) goal difference; 3) number of goals scored.
The points system until the 1990–91 season: 2 points for a win, 1 point for a draw and 0 points for losing.

=== Map ===
Location of the clubs in the 1962-63 Yorkshire League Division One on a map of Yorkshire and the Humber

== Division Two ==
Yorkshire Football League Division Two
- Season: 1961–62
- Champions: Bridlington Trinity
- Promoted: Bridlington Trinity; Doncaster United; Swallownest Miners Welfare; Hatfield Main
- Matches played: 182
- Goals scored: 838 (4.6 per match)

Division Two featured ten clubs which competed in the previous season, along with four new clubs.

- Clubs relegated from Division One:
  - Doncaster United
  - Sheffield
- Plus:
  - Brodsworth Main Colliery, joined from the Doncaster & District Senior League
  - Hull Brunswick

Also, Wombwell changed name to Wombwell Sporting Association.

=== League table ===
Pos	Team	Pld	W	D	L	GF	GA	GR	Pts	Qualification or relegation
1	Bridlington Trinity	26	19	4	3	75	23	3.261	42	Promoted to Division One
2	Doncaster United	26	17	4	5	75	37	2.027	38	Promoted to Division One
3	Swallownest Miners Welfare	26	18	2	6	81	42	1.929	38	Promoted to Division One
4	Hatfield Main	26	17	2	7	86	47	1.830	36	Promoted to Division One
5	Wombwell Sporting Association	26	14	2	10	70	51	1.373	30	
6	Rawmarsh Welfare	26	12	5	9	69	52	1.327	29	
7	Sheffield	26	11	5	10	61	48	1.271	27	
8	Harrogate Railway Athletic	26	11	3	12	63	74	0.851	25	
9	Hull Brunswick	26	10	4	12	59	52	1.135	24	
10	Thorne Colliery	26	6	8	12	52	60	0.867	20	
11	Brodsworth Main Colliery	26	8	3	15	49	71	0.690	19	
12	Salts	26	9	1	16	47	72	0.653	19	
13	York City 'A'	26	6	2	18	27	64	0.422	14	
14	South Kirkby Colliery	26	0	3	23	24	145	0.166	3	

Source: fchd
Rules for classification: 1) points; 2) goal difference; 3) number of goals scored.
The points system until the 1990–91 season: 2 points for a win, 1 point for a draw and 0 points for losing.

=== Map ===
Location of the clubs in the 1962–63 Yorkshire League Division Two on a map of Yorkshire and the Humber

== Division Three ==
Yorkshire Football League Division Three
- Season: 1961–62
- Champions: Farsley Celtic reserves
- Matches played: 72
- Goals scored: 346 (4.81 per match)

Division Three featured nine new clubs.

=== League table ===
Pos	Team	Pld	W	D	L	GF	GA	GR	Pts	Qualification or relegation
1	Farsley Celtic reserves	16	13	1	2	68	10	6.800	27	
2	Ossett Albion reserves	16	7	3	6	44	43	1.023	17	
3	Leeds United 'A'	16	8	0	8	39	35	1.114	16	Resigned from the league
4	Yorkshire Amateur reserves	16	6	3	7	32	37	0.865	15	
5	Salts reserves	16	7	1	8	33	40	0.825	15	
6	Harrogate Town reserves	16	5	4	7	21	36	0.583	14	
7	Ossett Town reserves	16	7	0	9	41	56	0.732	14	
8	East End Park reserves	16	5	3	8	43	39	1.103	13	Resigned from the league
9	Harrogate Railway Athletic reserves	16	5	3	8	25	50	0.500	13	

Source: fchd
Rules for classification: 1) points; 2) goal difference; 3) number of goals scored.
The points system until the 1990–91 season: 2 points for a win, 1 point for a draw and 0 points for losing.

=== Map ===
Location of the clubs in the 1961–62 Yorkshire League Division Three on a map of Yorkshire and the Humber
