= 1964–65 Yorkshire Football League =

The 1964–65 Yorkshire Football League was the 39th season in the history of the Yorkshire Football League, a football competition in England.

== Division One ==
Yorkshire Football League Division One
- Season: 1964–65
- Champions: Wombwell Sporting Association
- Relegated: Brodsworth Miners Welfare; Harrogate Railway Athletic; Hull Brunswick
- Matches played: 240
- Goals scored: 980 (4.08 per match)

Division One featured 12 clubs which competed in the previous season, along with four new clubs, promoted from Division Two:

- Brodsworth Miners Welfare
- Harrogate Railway Athletic
- Hatfield Main
- Rawmarsh Welfare

=== League table ===
| Pos | Team | Pld | W | D | L | GF | GA | GR | Pts | Qualification or relegation |
|---|---|---|---|---|---|---|---|---|---|---|
| 1 | Wombwell Sporting Association | 30 | 18 | 8 | 4 | 82 | 28 | 2.929 | 44 | |
| 2 | Swillington Miners Welfare | 30 | 20 | 3 | 7 | 89 | 51 | 1.745 | 43 | Resigned from the league |
| 3 | Ossett Albion | 30 | 17 | 6 | 7 | 68 | 29 | 2.345 | 40 | |
| 4 | Hatfield Main | 30 | 16 | 6 | 8 | 68 | 50 | 1.360 | 38 | |
| 5 | Bridlington Town | 30 | 14 | 9 | 7 | 69 | 41 | 1.683 | 37 | |
| 6 | Bridlington Trinity | 30 | 16 | 5 | 9 | 70 | 62 | 1.129 | 37 | |
| 7 | Farsley Celtic | 30 | 14 | 8 | 8 | 60 | 44 | 1.364 | 36 | |
| 8 | Scarborough reserves | 30 | 14 | 5 | 11 | 71 | 57 | 1.246 | 33 | |
| 9 | Mexborough Town | 30 | 11 | 8 | 11 | 58 | 57 | 1.018 | 30 | |
| 10 | Rawmarsh Welfare | 30 | 13 | 4 | 13 | 64 | 74 | 0.865 | 30 | |
| 11 | Hallam | 30 | 11 | 4 | 15 | 55 | 56 | 0.982 | 26 | |
| 12 | Harrogate Town | 30 | 9 | 7 | 14 | 46 | 55 | 0.836 | 25 | |
| 13 | Selby Town | 30 | 7 | 6 | 17 | 50 | 85 | 0.588 | 20 | |
| 14 | Harrogate Railway Athletic | 30 | 6 | 5 | 19 | 44 | 70 | 0.629 | 17 | Relegated to Division Two |
| 15 | Hull Brunswick | 30 | 7 | 2 | 21 | 42 | 92 | 0.457 | 16 | Relegated to Division Two |
| 16 | Brodsworth Miners Welfare | 30 | 3 | 2 | 25 | 44 | 129 | 0.341 | 8 | Relegated to Division Two |

Source: fchd
Rules for classification: 1) points; 2) goal difference; 3) number of goals scored.
The points system until the 1990–91 season: 2 points for a win, 1 point for a draw and 0 points for losing.

=== Map ===
Location of the clubs in the 1964–65 Yorkshire League Division One on a map of Yorkshire and the Humber

== Division Two ==
Yorkshire Football League Division Two
- Season: 1964–65
- Champions: Stocksbridge Works
- Promoted: Barton Town; Frickley Colliery reserves Goole Town reserves Stocksbridge Works
- Matches played: 210
- Goals scored: 777 (3.7 per match)

Division Two featured nine clubs which competed in the previous season, along with six new clubs.

- Clubs relegated from Division One:
  - Doncaster United
  - Norton Woodseats
  - Stocksbridge Works
  - Swallownest Miners Welfare
- Plus:
  - Barton Town, joined from the Lincolnshire Football League
  - Retford Town reserves

=== League table ===
| Pos | Team | Pld | W | D | L | GF | GA | GR | Pts | Qualification or relegation |
|---|---|---|---|---|---|---|---|---|---|---|
| 1 | Stocksbridge Works | 28 | 20 | 4 | 4 | 85 | 29 | 2.931 | 44 | Promoted to Division One |
| 2 | Barton Town | 28 | 18 | 4 | 6 | 88 | 35 | 2.514 | 40 | Promoted to Division One |
| 3 | Frickley Colliery reserves | 28 | 17 | 4 | 7 | 56 | 37 | 1.514 | 38 | Promoted to Division One |
| 4 | Goole Town reserves | 28 | 15 | 5 | 8 | 65 | 37 | 1.757 | 35 | Promoted to Division One |
| 5 | Kiveton Park | 28 | 14 | 5 | 9 | 51 | 32 | 1.594 | 33 | |
| 6 | Retford Town reserves | 28 | 11 | 8 | 9 | 54 | 41 | 1.317 | 30 | |
| 7 | Yorkshire Amateur | 28 | 13 | 3 | 12 | 54 | 61 | 0.885 | 29 | |
| 8 | Sheffield | 28 | 12 | 4 | 12 | 47 | 41 | 1.146 | 28 | |
| 9 | Doncaster United | 28 | 9 | 8 | 11 | 41 | 46 | 0.891 | 26 | |
| 10 | Swallownest Miners Welfare | 28 | 10 | 5 | 13 | 47 | 55 | 0.855 | 25 | |
| 11 | Grimethorpe Miners Welfare | 28 | 10 | 3 | 15 | 45 | 60 | 0.750 | 23 | Resigned |
| 12 | Norton Woodseats | 28 | 9 | 4 | 15 | 45 | 62 | 0.726 | 22 | |
| 13 | Thorne Colliery | 28 | 7 | 7 | 14 | 43 | 72 | 0.597 | 21 | |
| 14 | Salts | 28 | 6 | 4 | 18 | 30 | 75 | 0.400 | 16 | Resigned to the West Yorkshire League |
| 15 | Ossett Town | 28 | 4 | 2 | 22 | 26 | 94 | 0.277 | 10 | |

Source: fchd
Rules for classification: 1) points; 2) goal difference; 3) number of goals scored.
The points system until the 1990–91 season: 2 points for a win, 1 point for a draw and 0 points for losing.

=== Map ===
Location of the clubs in the 1964–65 Yorkshire League Division Two on a map of Yorkshire and the Humber

== League Cup ==
1964–65 Yorkshire Football League League Cup
Tournament details
- Country: England

=== Final ===
| Bridlington Trinity | 4–2 | Scarborough reserves |
