= 1966–67 Yorkshire Football League =

The 1966–67 Yorkshire Football League was the 41st season in the history of the Yorkshire Football League, a football competition in England.

== Division One ==
Yorkshire Football League Division One
- Season: 1966–67
- Champions: Bridlington Trinity
- Relegated: Harrogate Town; Scarborough reserves Sheffield
- Matches played: 272
- Goals scored: 1,014 (3.73 per match)

Division One featured 13 clubs which competed in the previous season, along with four new clubs, promoted from Division Two:

- Kiveton Park
- Norton Woodseats
- Sheffield
- Thorne Colliery

=== League table ===
Pos	Team	Pld	W	D	L	GF	GA	GR	Pts	Qualification or relegation
1	Bridlington Trinity	32	22	3	7	101	43	2.349	47	
2	Bridlington Town	32	21	5	6	83	43	1.930	47	
3	Wombwell Sporting Association	32	15	12	5	57	35	1.629	42	
4	Thorne Colliery	32	16	9	7	68	53	1.283	41	
5	Hatfield Main	32	17	4	11	70	46	1.522	38	
6	Barton Town	32	16	2	14	71	69	1.029	34	
7	Farsley Celtic	32	14	6	12	44	44	1.000	34	
8	Mexborough Town	32	15	4	13	61	65	0.938	34	
9	Kiveton Park	32	15	4	13	54	60	0.900	34	
10	Hallam	32	13	6	13	50	50	1.000	32	
11	Selby Town	32	13	5	14	60	60	1.000	31	
12	Norton Woodseats	32	13	5	14	53	55	0.964	31	
13	Ossett Albion	32	11	9	12	52	54	0.963	31	
14	Frickley Colliery reserves	32	10	2	20	56	73	0.767	22	Resigned from the league
15	Scarborough reserves	32	9	4	19	51	78	0.654	22	Relegated to Division Two
16	Sheffield	32	7	2	23	49	76	0.645	16	Relegated to Division Two
17	Harrogate Town	32	1	6	25	34	110	0.309	8	Relegated to Division Two

Source: fchd
Rules for classification: 1) points; 2) goal difference; 3) number of goals scored.
The points system until the 1990–91 season: 2 points for a win, 1 point for a draw and 0 points for losing.

=== Map ===
Location of the clubs in the 1966–67 Yorkshire League Division One on a map of Yorkshire and the Humber

== Division Two ==
Yorkshire Football League Division Two
- Season: 1966–67
- Champions: Hull Brunswick
- Promoted: Denaby United; Hull Brunswick; Stocksbridge Works; York City reserves
- Matches played: 272
- Goals scored: 1,042 (3.83 per match)

Division Two featured eleven clubs which competed in the previous season, along with six new clubs.

- Clubs relegated from Division One:
  - Rawmarsh Welfare
  - Stocksbridge Works
- Plus:
  - Bradford City 'A'
  - Hamptons Sports
  - Micklefield Welfare, joined from the West Yorkshire League
  - York City reserves, joined from the North Regional League

=== League table ===
Pos	Team	Pld	W	D	L	GF	GA	GR	Pts	Qualification or relegation
1	Hull Brunswick	32	25	3	4	105	40	2.625	53	Promoted to Division One
2	Denaby United	32	23	2	7	91	40	2.275	48	Promoted to Division One
3	York City reserves	32	21	3	8	96	42	2.286	45	Promoted to Division One
4	Stocksbridge Works	32	17	7	8	79	53	1.491	41	Promoted to Division One
5	Bradford City 'A'	32	18	4	10	72	41	1.756	40	Resigned from the league
6	Doncaster United	32	17	6	9	55	38	1.447	40	
7	Retford Town reserves	32	17	4	11	66	54	1.222	38	
8	Hamptons Sports	32	12	7	13	53	54	0.981	31	
9	Harrogate Railway Athletic	32	14	3	15	54	58	0.931	31	
10	Leeds Ashley Road	32	13	4	15	53	67	0.791	30	
11	Micklefield Welfare	32	12	4	16	37	57	0.649	28	
12	Rawmarsh Welfare	32	10	7	15	60	69	0.870	27	
13	Yorkshire Amateur	32	9	4	19	49	60	0.817	22	
14	Ossett Town	32	8	6	18	51	79	0.646	22	
15	Heeley Amateurs	32	7	6	19	53	97	0.546	20	
16	Swallownest Miners Welfare	32	5	6	21	38	82	0.463	16	
17	Brodsworth Miners Welfare	32	4	4	24	30	111	0.270	12	

Source: fchd
Rules for classification: 1) points; 2) goal difference; 3) number of goals scored.
The points system until the 1990–91 season: 2 points for a win, 1 point for a draw and 0 points for losing.

=== Map ===
Location of the clubs in the 1966–67 Yorkshire League Division Two on a map of Yorkshire and the Humber

== League Cup ==
1966–67 Yorkshire Football League League Cup
Tournament details
- Country: England

=== Final ===
Farsley Celtic	3–0	Bridlington Trinity
