= 1965–66 Yorkshire Football League =

The 1965–66 Yorkshire Football League was the 40th season in the history of the Yorkshire Football League, a football competition in England.

== Division One ==
Yorkshire Football League Division One
- Season: 1965–66
- Champions: Wombwell Sporting Association
- Relegated: Rawmarsh Welfare; Stocksbridge Works
- Matches played: 240
- Goals scored: 954 (3.98 per match)

Division One featured 12 clubs which competed in the previous season, along with four new clubs, promoted from Division Two:

- Barton Town
- Frickley Colliery reserves
- Goole Town reserves
- Stocksbridge Works

=== League table ===
Pos	Team	Pld	W	D	L	GF	GA	GR	Pts	Qualification or relegation
1	Wombwell Sporting Association	30	18	7	5	62	37	1.676	43	
2	Hatfield Main	30	19	2	9	100	54	1.852	40	
3	Selby Town	30	15	10	5	67	37	1.811	40	
4	Ossett Albion	30	19	2	9	64	40	1.600	40	
5	Bridlington Town	30	16	6	8	62	44	1.409	38	
6	Bridlington Trinity	30	16	2	12	85	60	1.417	34	
7	Farsley Celtic	30	15	4	11	49	36	1.361	34	
8	Barton Town	30	15	4	11	83	68	1.221	34	
9	Mexborough Town	30	14	4	12	66	51	1.294	32	
10	Goole Town reserves	30	13	4	13	50	52	0.962	30	Resigned from the league
11	Scarborough reserves	30	11	5	14	51	52	0.981	27	
12	Hallam	30	11	4	15	50	59	0.847	26	
13	Frickley Colliery reserves	30	7	7	16	41	77	0.532	21	
14	Harrogate Town	30	8	3	19	49	65	0.754	19	
15	Rawmarsh Welfare	30	4	5	21	34	98	0.347	13	Relegated to Division Two
16	Stocksbridge Works	30	2	5	23	41	124	0.331	9	Relegated to Division Two

Source: fchd
Rules for classification: 1) points; 2) goal difference; 3) number of goals scored.
The points system until the 1990–91 season: 2 points for a win, 1 point for a draw and 0 points for losing.

=== Map ===
Location of the clubs in the 1965–66 Yorkshire League Division One on a map of Yorkshire and the Humber

== Division Two ==
Yorkshire Football League Division Two
- Season: 1965–66
- Champions: Norton Woodseats
- Promoted: Kiveton Park; Norton Woodseats; Sheffield; Thorne Colliery
- Matches played: 210
- Goals scored: 924 (4.4 per match)

Division Two featured eleven clubs which competed in the previous season, along with six new clubs.

- Clubs relegated from Division One:
  - Brodsworth Miners Welfare
  - Harrogate Railway Athletic
  - Hull Brunswick
- Plus:
  - Denaby United, relegated from the Midland League
  - Heeley Amateurs
  - Leeds Ashley Road

=== League table ===
Pos	Team	Pld	W	D	L	GF	GA	GR	Pts	Qualification or relegation
1	Norton Woodseats	28	18	5	5	85	35	2.429	41	Promoted to Division One
2	Thorne Colliery	28	17	5	6	90	49	1.837	39	Promoted to Division One
3	Sheffield	28	15	5	8	61	33	1.848	35	Promoted to Division One
4	Kiveton Park	28	15	4	9	70	57	1.228	34	Promoted to Division One
5	Denaby United	28	14	5	9	84	40	2.100	33	
6	Hull Brunswick	28	15	3	10	70	60	1.167	33	
7	Heeley Amateurs	28	13	6	9	56	62	0.903	32	
8	Retford Town reserves	28	11	8	9	66	48	1.375	30	
9	Harrogate Railway Athletic	28	12	2	14	64	51	1.255	26	
10	Swallownest Miners Welfare	28	11	4	13	55	70	0.786	26	
11	Yorkshire Amateur	28	8	7	13	46	57	0.807	23	
12	Doncaster United	28	10	3	15	54	68	0.794	23	
13	Ossett Town	28	8	4	16	44	104	0.423	20	
14	Leeds Ashley Road	28	7	4	17	47	61	0.770	18	
15	Brodsworth Miners Welfare	28	2	3	23	32	129	0.248	7	

Source: fchd
Rules for classification: 1) points; 2) goal difference; 3) number of goals scored.
The points system until the 1990–91 season: 2 points for a win, 1 point for a draw and 0 points for losing.

=== Map ===
Location of the clubs in the 1965–66 Yorkshire League Division Two on a map of Yorkshire and the Humber

== League Cup ==
1965–66 Yorkshire Football League League Cup
Tournament details
- Country: England

=== Semi-finals ===
Hallam	2–0	Mexborough Town

–

=== Final ===
Bridlington Town	2–1	Hallam
