= 1967–68 Yorkshire Football League =

The 1967–68 Yorkshire Football League was the 42nd season in the history of the Yorkshire Football League, a football competition in England.

== Division One ==
Yorkshire Football League Division One
- Season: 1967–68
- Champions: Bridlington Trinity
- Relegated: Stocksbridge Works
- Matches played: 272
- Goals scored: 991 (3.64 per match)

Division One featured 13 clubs which competed in the previous season, along with four new clubs, promoted from Division Two:

- Denaby United
- Hull Brunswick
- Stocksbridge Works
- York City reserves

=== League table ===
Pos	Team	Pld	W	D	L	GF	GA	GR	Pts	Qualification or relegation
1	Bridlington Trinity	32	24	4	4	90	42	2.143	52	
2	Denaby United	32	18	10	4	67	29	2.310	46	
3	Bridlington Town	32	20	6	6	74	47	1.574	46	
4	Hatfield Main	32	18	7	7	69	39	1.769	43	
5	Kiveton Park	32	15	9	8	54	40	1.350	39	
6	Farsley Celtic	32	15	7	10	48	34	1.412	37	
7	Hull Brunswick	32	14	9	9	60	45	1.333	37	
8	Wombwell Sporting Association	32	14	8	10	56	40	1.400	36	
9	Selby Town	32	14	8	10	65	61	1.066	36	
10	Barton Town	32	13	5	14	67	65	1.031	31	Transferred to the Midland League
11	Ossett Albion	32	9	10	13	40	58	0.690	28	
12	York City reserves	32	11	3	18	71	46	1.543	25	Resigned from the league
13	Mexborough Town	32	8	8	16	54	74	0.730	24	
14	Norton Woodseats	32	6	10	16	51	71	0.718	22	
15	Hallam	32	5	8	19	48	86	0.558	18	
16	Thorne Colliery	32	6	4	22	49	94	0.521	16	
17	Stocksbridge Works	32	2	4	26	28	99	0.283	8	Relegated to Division Two

Source: fchd
Rules for classification: 1) points; 2) goal difference; 3) number of goals scored.
The points system until the 1990–91 season: 2 points for a win, 1 point for a draw and 0 points for losing.

=== Map ===
Location of the clubs in the 1967–68 Yorkshire League Division One on a map of Yorkshire and the Humber

== Division Two ==
Yorkshire Football League Division Two
- Season: 1967–68
- Champions: Lincoln United
- Promoted: Hamptons Sports; Lincoln United; Retford Town reserves Thackley
- Matches played: 272
- Goals scored: 922 (3.39 per match)

Division Two featured twelve clubs which competed in the previous season, along with five new clubs.

- Clubs relegated from Division One:
  - Harrogate Town
  - Scarborough reserves
  - Sheffield
- Plus:
  - Lincoln United, joined from the Lincolnshire Football League
  - Thackley, joined from the West Yorkshire League

=== League table ===
Pos	Team	Pld	W	D	L	GF	GA	GR	Pts	Qualification or relegation
1	Lincoln United	32	23	5	4	96	23	4.174	51	Promoted to Division One
2	Hamptons Sports	32	20	6	6	79	35	2.257	46	Promoted to Division One
3	Retford Town reserves	32	19	8	5	75	38	1.974	46	Promoted to Division One
4	Thackley	32	17	9	6	54	28	1.929	43	Promoted to Division One
5	Heeley Amateurs	32	20	3	9	62	49	1.265	43	
6	Leeds Ashley Road	32	16	5	11	55	51	1.078	37	
7	Micklefield Welfare	32	15	6	11	58	47	1.234	36	
8	Sheffield	32	14	7	11	56	44	1.273	35	
9	Harrogate Railway Athletic	32	12	9	11	44	62	0.710	33	
10	Scarborough reserves	32	12	7	13	62	66	0.939	31	
11	Yorkshire Amateur	32	9	7	16	37	62	0.597	25	
12	Swallownest Miners Welfare	32	7	10	15	45	60	0.750	24	
13	Doncaster United	32	8	5	19	40	51	0.784	21	
14	Rawmarsh Welfare	32	7	7	18	54	70	0.771	21	
15	Brodsworth Miners Welfare	32	6	8	18	38	71	0.535	20	
16	Ossett Town	32	6	6	20	36	86	0.419	18	
17	Harrogate Town	32	5	4	23	31	83	0.373	14	

Source: fchd
Rules for classification: 1) points; 2) goal difference; 3) number of goals scored.
The points system until the 1990–91 season: 2 points for a win, 1 point for a draw and 0 points for losing.

=== Map ===
Location of the clubs in the 1967–68 Yorkshire League Division Two on a map of Yorkshire and the Humber

== League Cup ==
1967–68 Yorkshire Football League League Cup
Tournament details
- Country: England

=== Final ===
Bridlington Trinity	2–1	Hull Brunswick
