= 1962–63 Yorkshire Football League =

The 1962–63 Yorkshire Football League was the 37th season in the history of the Yorkshire Football League, a football competition in England.

== Division One ==
Yorkshire Football League Division One
- Season: 1962-63
- Champions: Stocksbridge Works
- Relegated: Hatfield Main; Goole Town reserves Yorkshire Amateur; Grimethorpe Miners Welfare
- Matches played: 240
- Goals scored: 879 (3.66 per match)

Division One featured 12 clubs which competed in the previous season, along with four new clubs, promoted from Division Two:

- Bridlington Trinity
- Doncaster United
- Hatfield Main
- Swallownest Miners Welfare

=== League table ===
Pos	Team	Pld	W	D	L	GF	GA	GR	Pts	Qualification or relegation
1	Stocksbridge Works	30	19	7	4	83	28	2.964	45	
2	Harrogate Town	30	18	4	8	70	34	2.059	40	
3	Farsley Celtic	30	15	6	9	60	37	1.622	36	
4	Ossett Albion	30	13	9	8	63	49	1.286	35	
5	Bridlington Town	30	14	7	9	47	44	1.068	35	
6	Bridlington Trinity	30	12	7	11	69	70	0.986	31	
7	Norton Woodseats	30	11	8	11	53	51	1.039	30	
8	Swallownest Miners Welfare	30	12	4	14	56	55	1.018	28	
9	Scarborough reserves	30	10	8	12	50	55	0.909	28	
10	Selby Town	30	12	4	14	45	58	0.776	28	
11	Doncaster United	30	9	10	11	35	49	0.714	28	
12	Hallam	30	11	5	14	60	60	1.000	27	
13	Hatfield Main	30	10	5	15	55	69	0.797	25	Relegated to Division Two
14	Goole Town reserves	30	9	6	15	49	61	0.803	24	Relegated to Division Two
15	Yorkshire Amateur	30	8	6	16	44	70	0.629	22	Relegated to Division Two
16	Grimethorpe Miners Welfare	30	6	6	18	40	89	0.449	18	Relegated to Division Two

Source: fchd
Rules for classification: 1) points; 2) goal difference; 3) number of goals scored.
The points system until the 1990–91 season: 2 points for a win, 1 point for a draw and 0 points for losing.

=== Map ===
Location of the clubs in the 1962-63 Yorkshire League Division One on a map of Yorkshire and the Humber

== Division Two ==
Yorkshire Football League Division Two
- Season: 1962-63
- Champions: Wombwell Sporting Association
- Promoted: Wombwell Sporting Association; Mexborough Town; Swillington Miners Welfare; Hull Brunswick
- Matches played: 210
- Goals scored: 933 (4.44 per match)

Division Two featured ten clubs which competed in the previous season, along with five new clubs.

- Clubs relegated from Division One:
  - Frickley Colliery reserves
  - Ossett Town
  - Swillington Miners Welfare
- Plus:
  - Dodworth Miners Welfare
  - Mexborough Town, new club

Also, Brodsworth Main Colliery changed name to Brodsworth Main.

=== League table ===
Pos	Team	Pld	W	D	L	GF	GA	GR	Pts	Qualification or relegation
1	Wombwell Sporting Association	28	21	4	3	67	20	3.350	46	Promoted to Division One
2	Mexborough Town	28	15	11	2	64	28	2.286	41	Promoted to Division One
3	Swillington Miners Welfare	28	16	7	5	82	40	2.050	39	Promoted to Division One
4	Hull Brunswick	28	17	4	7	85	48	1.771	38	Promoted to Division One
5	Sheffield	28	18	0	10	78	44	1.773	36	
6	Ossett Town	28	13	7	8	82	54	1.519	33	
7	Salts	28	13	4	11	58	38	1.526	30	
8	Harrogate Railway Athletic	28	12	6	10	62	45	1.378	30	
9	Rawmarsh Welfare	28	13	4	11	67	61	1.098	30	
10	Frickley Colliery reserves	28	10	5	13	60	60	1.000	25	
11	Brodsworth Main	28	10	4	14	53	53	1.000	24	
12	Thorne Colliery	28	6	2	20	59	84	0.702	14	
13	York City 'A'	28	5	4	19	45	83	0.542	14	Resigned from the league
14	South Kirkby Colliery	28	4	3	21	38	134	0.284	11	
15	Dodworth Miners Welfare	28	4	1	23	33	141	0.234	9	

Source: fchd
Rules for classification: 1) points; 2) goal difference; 3) number of goals scored.
The points system until the 1990–91 season: 2 points for a win, 1 point for a draw and 0 points for losing.

=== Map ===
Location of the clubs in the 1962–63 Yorkshire League Division Two on a map of Yorkshire and the Humber

== Division Three ==
Yorkshire Football League Division Three
- Season: 1962-63
- Champions: Farsley Celtic reserves
- Matches played: 42
- Goals scored: 183 (4.36 per match)

Division Three featured seven clubs which competed in the previous season.

=== League table ===
Pos	Team	Pld	W	D	L	GF	GA	GR	Pts
1	Farsley Celtic reserves	12	10	1	1	37	13	2.846	21
2	Ossett Albion reserves	12	7	1	4	32	19	1.684	15
3	Yorkshire Amateur reserves	12	6	1	5	26	23	1.130	13
4	Salts reserves	12	5	2	5	24	29	0.828	12
5	Harrogate Railway Athletic reserves	12	5	1	6	25	32	0.781	11
6	Harrogate Town reserves	12	3	2	7	19	31	0.613	8
7	Ossett Town reserves	12	2	0	10	20	36	0.556	4

Source: fchd
Rules for classification: 1) points; 2) goal difference; 3) number of goals scored.
The points system until the 1990–91 season: 2 points for a win, 1 point for a draw and 0 points for losing.

=== Map ===
Location of the clubs in the 1962–63 Yorkshire League Division Three on a map of Yorkshire and the Humber
