= 1949–50 Yorkshire Football League =

Yorkshire Football League
- Season: 1949–50

The 1949–50 Yorkshire Football League was the 24th season in the history of the Yorkshire Football League. A new Second Division was formed for this season.

== Division One ==
Yorkshire Football League Division One
- Season: 1949-50
- Champions: Goole Town reserves
- Relegated: Chesterfield 'A'; Thorne Colliery

The division featured no new teams (compared to the single division of the season before).

=== Map ===
Location of the clubs in the 1949–50 Yorkshire League Division One on a map of Yorkshire and the Humber

=== League table ===
Pos	Team	Pld	W	D	L	GF	GA	GD	Pts	Qualification or relegation
1	Goole Town reserves (C)	34	27	3	4	91	37	+54	57	
2	Wombwell Athletic	34	22	6	6	73	29	+44	50	
3	Ossett Town	34	22	4	8	120	61	+59	48	
4	Scunthorpe & Lindsey United reserves	34	17	11	6	75	44	+31	45	Resigned
5	Yorkshire Amateur	34	19	5	10	85	55	+30	43	
6	Gainsborough Trinity reserves	34	15	10	9	79	57	+22	40	
7	Rotherham United 'A'	34	15	7	12	64	54	+10	37	
8	Selby Town	34	15	6	13	82	63	+19	36	
9	Sheffield United 'A'	34	15	4	15	75	52	+23	34	
10	Barnsley 'A'	34	13	7	14	53	49	+4	33	
11	Sheffield Wednesday 'A'	34	12	7	15	52	55	−3	31	
12	Huddersfield Town 'A'	34	12	6	16	58	65	−7	30	
13	Brodsworth Main	34	11	8	15	53	68	−15	30	
14	Leeds United 'A'	34	11	7	16	62	67	−5	29	
15	Halifax Town 'A'	34	11	4	19	52	71	−19	26	
16	Chesterfield 'A' (R)	34	6	7	21	48	90	−42	19	Relegation to Division Two
17	Thorne Colliery (R)	34	7	5	22	62	124	−62	19	Relegation to Division Two
18	Harworth Colliery	34	2	1	31	31	174	−143	5	Resigned

Rules for classification: 1) points; 2) goal difference; 3) number of goals scored.
The points system until the 1990–91 season: 2 points for a win, 1 point for a draw and 0 points for losing.
(C) Champions; (R) Relegated

== Division Two ==
Yorkshire Football League Division Two
- Season: 1949-50
- Champions: Retford Town
- Promoted: Beighton Miners Welfare; Dinnington Athletic; Retford Town; Scarborough reserves

The division featured 18 new teams:

- Beighton Miners Welfare, joined from Sheffield Association League
- Bentley Colliery, joined from Sheffield Association League
- Bradford Park Avenue 'A', relegated from Yorkshire League (single division)
- Dinnington Athletic, joined from Sheffield Association League
- Doncaster Rovers 'A', joined from Sheffield Association League
- Farsley Celtic, joined from the West Riding League
- Frickley Colliery reserves, joined from ??
- Hull City 'A', joined from ??
- Kiveton Park Colliery, joined from Sheffield Association League
- Maltby Main, joined from Sheffield Association League
- Norton Woodseats, joined from Sheffield Association League
- Retford Town, joined from Central Alliance
- Scarborough reserves, joined from ??
- Sheffield, joined from Sheffield Association League
- South Kirkby Colliery, relegated from Yorkshire League (single division)
- Stocksbridge Works, joined from Sheffield Association League
- Worksop Town reserves, joined from Sheffield Association League
- York City 'A', joined from ??

=== Map ===
Location of the clubs in the 1949–50 Yorkshire League Division Two on a map of Yorkshire and the Humber

=== League table ===
Pos	Team	Pld	W	D	L	GF	GA	GD	Pts	Qualification or relegation
1	Retford Town (C, P)	34	23	5	6	91	55	+36	51	Promotion to Division One
2	Beighton Miners Welfare (P)	34	21	7	6	103	60	+43	49	Promotion to Division One
3	Scarborough reserves (P)	34	20	8	6	95	47	+48	48	Promotion to Division One
4	Dinnington Athletic (P)	34	21	6	7	82	53	+29	48	Promotion to Division One
5	Norton Woodseats	34	20	4	10	86	49	+37	44	
6	Bentley Colliery	34	19	6	9	96	69	+27	44	
7	Stocksbridge Works	34	20	3	11	78	68	+10	43	
8	Farsley Celtic	34	16	5	13	100	76	+24	37	
9	Bradford Park Avenue 'A'	34	15	6	13	71	65	+6	36	
10	Sheffield	34	14	4	16	89	79	+10	32	
11	Hull City 'A'	34	14	4	16	99	89	+10	32	
12	Worksop Town reserves	34	12	6	16	78	86	−8	30	
13	Doncaster Rovers 'A'	34	11	8	15	60	78	−18	30	
14	South Kirkby Colliery	34	9	6	19	61	86	−25	24	
15	Frickley Colliery reserves	34	8	7	19	71	109	−38	23	
16	Maltby Main	34	4	8	22	48	117	−69	16	
17	York City 'A'	34	4	7	23	54	94	−40	15	
18	Kiveton Park Colliery	34	3	4	27	47	129	−82	10	

Rules for classification: 1) points; 2) goal difference; 3) number of goals scored.
The points system until the 1990–91 season: 2 points for a win, 1 point for a draw and 0 points for losing.
(C) Champions; (P) Promoted

== League Cup ==
1949–50 Yorkshire Football League League Cup
Tournament details
- Country: England

=== Semi-final ===
20 April 1950	Scarborough reserves	3–0	Rotherham United 'A'	Victoria Pleasure Grounds

–

=== Final ===
Scarborough reserves	3–0	Scunthorpe & Lindsey United reserves	Boothferry Park
