= 1921–22 Yorkshire Football League =

Yorkshire Football League
- Season: 1921–22
- Champions: Houghton Main

The 1921–22 Yorkshire Football League was the 2nd season in the history of the Yorkshire Football League.

== Clubs ==
The league featured 9 new teams:

- Brodsworth Main, new entrant joined from Doncaster & District League
- Castleford Town reserves, new entrant
- Doncaster Rovers reserves, new entrant
- Halifax Town reserves, new entrant
- Harrogate reserves, new entrant
- Houghton Main, new entrant
- Wakefield City reserves, new entrant
- Wath Athletic reserves, new entrant
- Wombwell reserves, new entrant

Also Goole Shipyards became Hook Shipyards.

=== Map ===
Location of the clubs in the 1921–22 Yorkshire League on a map of Yorkshire and the Humber

=== League table ===
Pos	Team	Pld	W	D	L	GF	GA	GR	Pts	Promotion or relegation
1	Houghton Main (C)	32	24	4	4	86	25	3.440	52	
2	Bradford Park Avenue reserves	32	23	4	5	119	36	3.306	50	
3	Brodsworth Main	32	20	7	5	81	34	2.382	47	
4	Wombwell reserves	32	21	4	7	86	45	1.911	46	
5	Halifax Town reserves	32	18	5	9	87	40	2.175	41	
6	Doncaster Rovers reserves	32	17	4	11	84	40	2.100	38	
7	Selby Town	32	15	7	10	94	51	1.843	37	
8	Rowntrees	32	14	9	9	60	44	1.364	37	Left the league
9	Acomb	32	18	1	13	61	86	0.709	37	
10	Wath Athletic reserves	32	14	5	13	80	59	1.356	33	Left the league
11	Fryston Colliery Welfare	32	13	2	17	76	65	1.169	28	
12	Harrogate reserves	32	10	5	17	62	74	0.838	25	Left the league
13	Yorkshire Amateur	32	9	4	19	69	72	0.958	22	
14	Castleford Town reserves	32	7	6	19	49	86	0.570	20	Left the league
15	Hook Shipyards	32	7	4	21	40	51	0.784	18	Left the league
16	Wakefield City reserves	32	3	4	25	33	140	0.236	10	Left the league
17	York YMCA	32	1	1	30	23	239	0.096	3	Left the league

Rules for classification: 1) points; 2) goal average
(C) Champions
