= 1920–21 Yorkshire Football League =

Yorkshire Football League
- Season: 1920–21
- Champions: Bradford Park Avenue reserves

The 1920–21 Yorkshire Football League was the 1st season in the history of the Yorkshire Football League.

== Clubs ==
The league featured 13 new teams:

- Acomb, new entrant
- Bradford Park Avenue reserves, new entrant
- Dewsbury & Savile, new entrant
- Fryston Colliery Welfare, new entrant
- Goole Shipyards, new entrant
- Harrogate, new entrant
- Rowntrees, new entrant
- Selby Town, new entrant
- Wakefield City, new entrant
- Wath Athletic, new entrant
- Wombwell, new entrant
- Yorkshire Amateur, new entrant
- York YMCA, new entrant

=== Map ===
Location of the clubs in the 1920–21 Yorkshire League on a map of Yorkshire and the Humber

=== League table ===
Pos	Team	Pld	W	D	L	GF	GA	GR	Pts	Promotion or relegation
1	Bradford Park Avenue reserves (C)	24	18	3	3	85	28	3.036	39	
2	Wombwell	24	16	4	4	67	18	3.722	36	Joined Midland League
3	Wath Athletic	24	15	4	5	56	29	1.931	34	Joined Midland League
4	Harrogate	24	15	3	6	66	41	1.610	33	Joined Midland League
5	Selby Town	24	11	5	8	55	47	1.170	27	
6	Wakefield City	24	10	6	8	41	33	1.242	26	Joined Midland League
7	Goole Shipyards	24	10	4	10	52	48	1.083	24	
8	Rowntrees	24	9	2	13	42	45	0.933	20	
9	Acomb	24	8	3	13	43	66	0.652	19	
10	Fryston Colliery Welfare	24	7	5	12	35	59	0.593	19	
11	Dewsbury & Savile	24	7	2	15	35	63	0.556	16	Left the league
12	Yorkshire Amateur	24	6	3	15	42	66	0.636	15	
13	York YMCA	24	2	0	22	18	95	0.189	4	

Rules for classification: 1) points; 2) goal average
(C) Champions
