= 1969–70 FA Trophy =

1969-70 FA Trophy
FA Challenge Trophy

Tournament details
- Country: England; Wales
- Teams: 187

Final positions
- Champions: Macclesfield Town
- Runners-up: Telford United

The 1969–70 FA Trophy was the first season of the FA Trophy. The competition was set up for non-league clubs which paid their players and were therefore not eligible to enter the FA Amateur Cup.

== First round qualifying ==
=== Ties ===
Tie	Home team	Score	Away team
1	Abergavenny Thursdays	2–3	Bath City
2	Alfreton Town	0–0	Chorley
3	Arnold	2–0	Leyland Motors
4	Ashby Institute	0–1	Hull Brunswick
5	Ashton United	5–1	Prescot Town
6	Barnstaple Town	1–2	Wadebridge Town
7	Bedworth United	0–0	Weston-super-Mare
8	Belper Town	0–3	Sutton Town
9	Bexley United	2–1	Fleet Town
10	Biggleswade Town	0–1	Ramsgate Athletic
11	Boston	2–2	Ely City
12	Brierley Hill Alliance	2–1	Dorchester Town
13	Chatham Town	0–4	Newmarket Town
14	Cheltenham Town	8–0	St Blazey
15	Cinderford Town	0–0	Lockheed Leamington
16	Clitheroe	1–3	Rhyl
17	Crawley Town	2–2	Lowestoft Town
18	Darlaston	1–1	Merthyr Tydfil
19	Deal Town	0–3	Haverhill Rovers
20	Denaby United	6–3	Annfield Plain
21	Dudley Town	1–2	Stourbridge
22	Dunstable	1–1	Rushden Town
23	Ellesmere Port Town	3–0	Bacup Borough
24	Gloucester City	4–0	Chippenham Town
25	Gresley Rovers	0–1	Ilkeston Town
26	Guildford City	2–0	Ashford Town (Kent)
27	Hastings United	2–0	Wellingborough Town
28	Holbeach United	0–0	Hinckley Athletic
30	Minehead	3–2	Bridport
31	Nantwich Town	3–1	Holyhead Town
32	Porthmadog	1–1	Droylsden
33	Portland United	1–1	Redditch United
34	Potton United	1–1	Banbury United
35	Prestatyn	3–3	Congleton Town
36	Retford Town	1–2	Horden Colliery Welfare
37	Rossendale United	2–1	Horwich RMI
38	Rugby Town	2–2	Thornycroft Athletic
39	Salisbury	4–2	Lower Gornal Athletic
40	Sandbach Ramblers	2–0	Loughborough United
41	Selby Town	1–2	Bridlington Trinity
42	Sittingbourne	0–4	Bedford Town
43	Skegness Town	2–0	Barton Town
44	Soham Town Rangers	1–2	Basingstoke Town
45	Spalding United	3–1	Desborough Town
46	Stamford	1–2	Cambridge City
47	Stevenage Athletic	1–1	Folkestone
48	St Neots Town	2–1	Clacton Town
49	Stockton	3–2	Louth United
50	Stonehouse	3–1	Barry Town
51	Street	1–4	Bilston
52	Tonbridge	2–2	Sheppey United
53	Ton Pentre	4–1	Lye Town
54	Trowbridge Town	5–0	Cowes
55	Welton Rovers	5–3	Pembroke Borough
56	Winsford United	3–3	Heanor Town
57	Wisbech Town	0–2	Corby Town
58	Wombwell Sporting Association	3–2	Boldon Colliery Welfare
59	Worksop Town	3–1	Frickley Colliery

=== Replays ===
Tie	Home team	Score	Away team
2	Chorley	1–0	Alfreton Town
7	Weston-super-Mare	0–2	Bedworth United
11	Ely City	1–2	Boston
15	Lockheed Leamington	2–0	Cinderford Town
17	Lowestoft Town	1–3	Crawley Town
18	Merthyr Tydfil	4–3	Darlaston
22	Rushden Town	3–0	Dunstable
28	Hinckley Athletic	0–0	Holbeach United
32	Droylsden	1–2	Porthmadog
33	Redditch United	4–1	Portland United
34	Banbury United	4–0	Potton United
35	Congleton Town	2–3	Prestatyn
38	Thornycroft Athletic	4–5	Rugby Town
Rugby Town removed: Thornycroft Athletic advance
47	Folkestone	2–0	Stevenage Athletic
52	Sheppey United	4–1	Tonbridge
56	Heanor Town	0–2	Winsford United

=== 2nd replay ===
Tie	Home team	Score	Away team
28	Holbeach United	2–2	Hinckley Athletic

=== 3rd Replay ===
Tie	Home team	Score	Away team
28	Holbeach United	3–1	Hinckley Athletic

== Second round qualifying ==
=== Ties ===
Tie	Home team	Score	Away team
1	Arnold	3–2	Oswestry Town
2	Banbury United	0–1	Bedford Town
3	Bath City	3–1	Bedworth United
4	Bletchley	2–2	Basingstoke Town
5	Boston	0–3	Guildford City
6	Cambridge City	6–0	Spalding United
7	Canterbury City	1–1	Hastings United
8	Cheltenham Town	3–1	Ton Pentre
9	Corby Town	5–0	Holbeach United
10	Denaby United	4–0	Hull Brunswick
11	Ellesmere Port Town	3–3	Porthmadog
12	Folkestone	0–1	Rushden Town
13	Horden Colliery Welfare	1–2	Worksop Town
14	Ilkeston Town	2–2	Prestatyn
15	Lockheed Leamington	0–4	Salisbury
16	Merthyr Tydfil	0–0	Minehead
17	Nantwich Town	1–2	Ashton United
18	Newmarket Town	1–2	Gravesend & Northfleet
19	Ramsgate Athletic	0–0	Crawley Town
20	Redditch United	0–1	Bridgend Town
21	Sandbach Ramblers	2–0	Rossendale United
22	Sheppey United	5–2	Haverhill Rovers
23	Skegness Town	1–2	Bexley United
24	Stockton	0–3	Scarborough
25	Stonehouse	2–1	Bilston
26	Stourbridge	1–1	Welton Rovers
27	Sutton Town	2–0	Chorley
28	Thornycroft Athletic	1–1	St Neots Town
29	Trowbridge Town	0–0	Gloucester City
30	Wadebridge Town	0–1	Brierley Hill Alliance
31	Winsford United	5–0	Rhyl
32	Wombwell Sporting Association	1–1	Bridlington Trinity

=== Replays ===
Tie	Home team	Score	Away team
4	Basingstoke Town	2–0	Bletchley
7	Hastings United	2–1	Canterbury City
11	Porthmadog	2–3	Ellesmere Port Town
14	Prestatyn	1–1	Ilkeston Town
16	Minehead	4–0	Merthyr Tydfil
19	Crawley Town	1–3	Ramsgate Athletic
26	Welton Rovers	1–4	Stourbridge
28	St Neots Town	0–2	Thornycroft Athletic
29	Gloucester City	3–2	Trowbridge Town
32	Bridlington Trinity	4–0	Wombwell Sporting Association

=== 2nd replay ===
Tie	Home team	Score	Away team
14	Ilkeston Town	3–1	Prestatyn

== Third round qualifying ==
=== Ties ===
Tie	Home team	Score	Away team
1	Altrincham	1–1	Buxton
2	Arnold	3–2	Ashton United
3	Atherstone Town	0–1	Winsford United
4	Bedford Town	5–1	Ramsgate Athletic
5	Bexley United	1–2	Hastings United
6	Bourne Town	2–5	Chelmsford City
7	Brentwood Town	3–1	Cambridge City
8	Bridgend Town	1–1	Minehead
9	Bridlington Trinity	2–1	Fleetwood
10	Brierley Hill Alliance	1–1	Stonehouse
11	Burton Albion	1–1	St Helens Town
12	Corby Town	2–1	Basingstoke Town
13	Dover	1–0	Sheppey United
14	Frome Town	0–3	Bath City
15	Gateshead	0–1	Denaby United
16	Gloucester City	0–1	Cheltenham Town
17	Grantham	2–1	Bury Town
18	Gravesend & Northfleet	2–0	Guildford City
19	Great Yarmouth Town	1–1	Dartford
20	Hereford United	2–0	Andover
21	Kettering Town	2–1	Boston United
22	Matlock Town	5–1	Darwen
23	Nuneaton Borough	7–0	Ellesmere Port Town
24	Runcorn	0–0	Northwich Victoria
25	Rushden Town	0–5	Barnet
26	Salisbury	1–1	Poole Town
27	Sandbach Ramblers	0–2	Ilkeston Town
28	South Liverpool	3–0	Sutton Town
29	Stourbridge	3–2	Halesowen Town
30	Telford United	5–0	Witton Albion
31	Thornycroft Athletic	2–0	Margate
32	Worksop Town	0–0	Scarborough

=== Replays ===
Tie	Home team	Score	Away team
1	Buxton	3–2	Altrincham
8	Minehead	4–0	Bridgend Town
10	Stonehouse	3–1	Brierley Hill Alliance
11	St Helens Town	0–2	Burton Albion
19	Dartford	3–0	Great Yarmouth Town
24	Northwich Victoria	3–0	Runcorn
26	Poole Town	1–0	Salisbury
32	Scarborough	2–1	Worksop Town

== First round ==
The teams that given byes to this round are Cambridge United, Hillingdon Borough, Wimbledon, King's Lynn, Worcester City, Romford, Weymouth, Yeovil Town, Macclesfield Town, Wigan Athletic, Morecambe, Gainsborough Trinity, South Shields, Bangor City, Hyde United, Goole Town, Stafford Rangers, Great Harwood, Mossley, New Brighton, Kidderminster Harriers, Tamworth, Hednesford, Bromsgrove Rovers, Taunton Town, Bideford, Bridgwater Town, Glastonbury, Kirkby Town, Lancaster City and Burscough.

=== Ties ===
Tie	Home team	Score	Away team
1	Arnold	2–5	Wigan Athletic
2	Bangor City	4–2	Morecambe
3	Bath City	3–4	Barnet
4	Bedford Town	3–4	Chelmsford City
5	Brentwood Town	1–1	Hereford United
6	Bridgwater Town	2–1	Taunton Town
7	Bridlington Trinity	0–0	Worcester City
8	Burton Albion	5–0	New Brighton
9	Buxton	1–1	Lancaster City
10	Cambridge United	2–1	Minehead
11	Corby Town	4–3	Yeovil Town
12	Dartford	3–2	Wimbledon
13	Denaby United	2–2	Great Harwood Town
14	Gainsborough Trinity	3–1	Hyde United
15	Glastonbury	1–2	Bideford
16	Gravesend & Northfleet	1–0	Hastings United
17	Hednesford	1–4	Kidderminster Harriers
18	Hillingdon Borough	1–0	Dover
19	Ilkeston Town	0–2	Telford United
20	King's Lynn	0–2	Grantham
21	Macclesfield Town	1–0	Burscough
22	Mossley	4–0	Goole Town
23	Nuneaton Borough	3–0	Stonehouse
24	Poole Town	1–1	Kettering Town
25	Romford	3–0	Cheltenham Town
26	Scarborough	1–1	Tamworth
27	South Shields	2–3	Matlock Town
28	Stafford Rangers	5–2	South Liverpool
29	Stalybridge Celtic	2–3	Bromsgrove Rovers
30	Stourbridge	5–1	Northwich Victoria
31	Weymouth	5–0	Thornycroft Athletic
32	Winsford United	2–2	Kirkby Town

=== Replays ===
Tie	Home team	Score	Away team
5	Hereford United	2–1	Brentwood Town
7	Worcester City	3–0	Bridlington Trinity
9	Lancaster City	2–3	Buxton
13	Great Harwood Town	3–2	Denaby United
24	Kettering Town	4–0	Poole Town
26	Tamworth	0–3	Scarborough
32	Kirkby Town	1–0	Winsford United

== Second round ==
=== Ties ===
Tie	Home team	Score	Away team
1	Bangor City	2–0	Kidderminster Harriers
2	Barnet	2–0	Hereford United
3	Bridgwater Town	2–1	Dartford
4	Bromsgrove Rovers	2–1	Cambridge United
5	Burton Albion	4–0	Stafford Rangers
6	Buxton	1–2	Matlock Town
7	Chelmsford City	3–2	Nuneaton Borough
8	Corby Town	1–2	Hillingdon Borough
9	Gravesend & Northfleet	2–3	Romford
10	Great Harwood Town	1–3	Grantham
11	Macclesfield Town	2–0	Gainsborough Trinity
12	Mossley	1–1	Scarborough
13	Stourbridge	1–1	Kettering Town
14	Telford United	1–0	Wigan Athletic
15	Weymouth	3–0	Bideford
16	Worcester City	3–2	Kirkby Town

=== Replays ===
Tie	Home team	Score	Away team
12	Scarborough	2–3	Mossley
13	Kettering Town	2–1	Stourbridge

== Third round ==
=== Ties ===
Tie	Home team	Score	Away team
1	Bangor City	1–1	Macclesfield Town
2	Barnet	2–1	Bromsgrove Rovers
3	Burton Albion	2–1	Bridgwater Town
4	Grantham	1–1	Worcester City
5	Hillingdon Borough	0–0	Weymouth
6	Kettering Town	0–3	Chelmsford City
7	Matlock Town	2–2	Mossley
8	Romford	1–1	Telford United

=== Replays ===
Tie	Home team	Score	Away team
1	Macclesfield Town	1–0	Bangor City
4	Worcester City	3–1	Grantham
5	Weymouth	0–1	Hillingdon Borough
7	Mossley	3–3	Matlock Town
8	Telford United	2–1	Romford

=== 2nd replay ===
Tie	Home team	Score	Away team
7	Matlock Town	1–2	Mossley

== Fourth round ==
=== Ties ===
Tie	Home team	Score	Away team
1	Barnet	8–1	Mossley
2	Burton Albion	1–1	Macclesfield Town
3	Hillingdon Borough	0–0	Chelmsford City
4	Worcester City	1–3	Telford United

=== Replays ===
Tie	Home team	Score	Away team
2	Macclesfield Town	4–2	Burton Albion
3	Chelmsford City	2–1	Hillingdon Borough

== Semi-finals ==
=== Ties ===
Tie	Home team	Score	Away team
1	Macclesfield Town	1–0	Barnet
2	Telford United	2–0	Chelmsford City

== Final ==
Tie	Home team	Score	Away team
1	Macclesfield Town	2–0	Telford United
