= Billy Wood (footballer, born 1900) =

English footballer

Personal information
- Full name: William Wood
- Date of birth: 1900
- Place of birth: Parkgate, England
- Position: Inside forward

Senior career*
Years	Team	Apps	(Gls)
1918–1919	Parkgate Christ Church		
1919–1920	Retford Town		
1920–1921	Wombwell		
1921–1923	Oldham Athletic	24	(4)
1923–1924	Northampton Town	32	(6)
1924–1925	Swansea Town	0	(0)
1925–1926	Wellingborough Town		
1926	Rugby Town		
Total		56	(10)
- * Club domestic league appearances and goals

William Wood (born 1900; year of death unknown) was an English footballer who played in the Football League for Northampton Town and Oldham Athletic.
