= Les Collinson =

English footballer

Personal information
- Full name: Leslie Collinson
- Date of birth: 2 December 1935 (age 90)
- Place of birth: Hull, East Riding of Yorkshire, England
- Height: 5 ft 11 1/2 in (1.82 m)
- Position: Half-back

Senior career*
Years	Team	Apps	(Gls)
1953–1967	Hull City	297	(14)
1967–1968	York City	35	(2)
1968–1970	Goole Town		
1970–1975	Hull Brunswick		
1975–	Chilton Amateurs		
Total		332	(16)
- * Club domestic league appearances and goals

Leslie "Les" Collinson (born 2 December 1935) is an English former professional footballer who played as a half-back in the Football League for Hull City and York City, in non-League football for Goole Town, Hull Brunswick and Chilton Amateurs.
