= Huddersfield F.C. =

Huddersfield
- Full name: Huddersfield Football Club

Huddersfield Football Club was an English association football based in the large market town of Huddersfield, West Yorkshire, England.

== History ==
They entered the FA Amateur Cup in 1896 and 1901, as well being founder members of the old Yorkshire League in 1897, and joint winners, with Hunslet, of the Yorkshire League during the 1899–1900 season.

== See also ==
- Huddersfield Town A.F.C.
- Huddersfield Giants
