= Hunslet F.C. =

Hunslet F.C. may refer to:

- Hunslet F.C. (association football), an English association football (soccer) club
- Hunslet R.L.F.C., an English rugby league football club
- Hunslet F.C. (1883), a former English rugby league football club
