= Jimmy Dyer =

English footballer (1883–1971)

Personal information
- Full name: James Arthur Dyer
- Date of birth: 24 August 1883
- Place of birth: Barnsley, England
- Date of death: Q1 1971 (aged 88)
- Place of death: Crewe, England

Senior career*
Years	Team	Apps	(Gls)
- Wombwell Town
1901–1902	Barnsley	2	(0)
- Doncaster Rovers
- Ashton Town
1905–1908	Manchester United	1	(0)
1908–1909	West Ham United	3	(0)
1909–1910	Bradford Park Avenue	0	(0)
- Wombwell Town
- Mexborough
- Castleford Town
- Harrogate
- * Club domestic league appearances and goals

James Arthur Dyer (24 August 1883 – 1971) was an English footballer. His regular position was as a forward.

Dyer was born in Blacker Hill in Barnsley. He played for Wombwell Town before moving to Barnsley, where he made two Football League appearances. After spells at Doncaster Rovers and Ashton Town, he moved to Manchester United but only made a single appearance.

The 1908–09 season saw a move to West Ham United of the Southern League. He made three appearances for the east London club during September 1909, before moving to Bradford Park Avenue, where he failed to make a League appearance.
