= Christian Fox =

Scottish footballer and manager

Personal information
- Full name: Christian Benjamin Fox
- Date of birth: 11 April 1981 (age 45)
- Place of birth: Laurencekirk, Aberdeenshire, Scotland
- Height: 5 ft 10 in (1.78 m)
- Position: Midfielder

Team information
- Current team: Selby Town (Head coach)

Youth career
- –1999: York City

Senior career*
Years	Team	Apps	(Gls)
1999–2004	York City	70	(1)
2002	Larne (loan)		
2004–2007	Harrogate Town		
2007–2015	Selby Town		

Managerial career
- 2016–2017: Selby Town (head of youth)
- 2017–2022: Selby Town
- * Club domestic league appearances and goals

Christian Benjamin Fox (born 11 April 1981) is a Scottish football manager, most recently for Selby Town, and former professional footballer who played as a midfielder for York City, Larne, Selby Town, Pickering Town and Wakefield.

He was also called up for a 3-day England Under 18 squad training session in July 1999.
