= Sid Storey =

English football player (1919–2010)

Personal information
- Full name: Sidney Storey
- Date of birth: 25 December 1919
- Place of birth: Darfield, England
- Date of death: 6 April 2010 (aged 90)
- Place of death: York, England
- Height: 5 ft 8 in (1.73 m)
- Position: Inside forward

Senior career*
Years	Team	Apps	(Gls)
- Ardsley Welfare
–1943	Grimethorpe Athletic		
1943–????	Huddersfield Town	0	(0)
–1947	Wombwell Athletic		
1947–1956	York City	330	(40)
1956–1957	Barnsley	29	(4)
1957–1959	Accrington Stanley	30	(2)
1959–1960	Bradford Park Avenue	2	(0)
Total		391	(46)
- * Club domestic league appearances and goals

Sidney Storey (25 December 1919 – 6 April 2010) was an English professional footballer who played as an inside forward.

Storey played for Ardsley Welfare and Grimethorpe Athletic in non-League football while working as a miner, before joining Huddersfield Town in 1943. After leaving them he played for Wombwell Athletic before moving to York City in 1947. He played for York in the FA Cup semi-final in 1955 and left a year later after making 354 appearances to join hometown club Barnsley. He later had periods with Accrington Stanley and Bradford Park Avenue before returning to York as trainer-coach for three years.

== Career ==
Born in Darfield, West Riding of Yorkshire, Storey worked at a W. H. Smith in Barnsley, West Riding of Yorkshire at the age of 14 before becoming a miner at Houghton Main Colliery. Meanwhile, he played non-League football for local colliery sides Ardsley Welfare and Grimethorpe Athletic before signing for Huddersfield Town in September 1943. He was released by the club soon after and returned to play non-League football for Wombwell Athletic, where his father worked as a trainer. He joined Third Division North team York City for a fee of £100 in May 1947, combining mining with playing and training for the club. He was later rated as "perhaps the best bargain York City ever bought". He made his debut in a 2–2 home draw at Bootham Crescent with Wrexham on 27 May 1947 and finished the remainder of the 1946–47 season with three appearances. He missed one game for York during the 1947–48 season, making 42 appearances and scoring 12 goals in all competitions. An injury resulted in him missing the FA Cup semi-final against Newcastle United on 26 March 1955 and several league games, with many fans believing this cost the club promotion, although he was able to play in the 2–0 defeat to Newcastle in the semi-final replay on 30 March at Roker Park.

He received a benefit match in 1955 and was granted a free transfer in 1956 after making 354 appearances and scoring 42 goals in all competitions for York, joining hometown club Barnsley in May to run their reserve team. He managed to play for Barnsley due to an injury to one of their first team players and he was able to "demonstrate that his old skills had not deserted him". He made 29 appearances and scored four goals in the league for Barnsley before joining Accrington Stanley in October 1957, where he "once more belied his age with some top class displays". He made 30 appearances and scored two goals for Accrington in the league and joined Bradford Park Avenue as player-coach of the reserves in July 1959.

He made two league appearances for Park Avenue and following his retirement as a player he rejoined the York coaching staff as a trainer-coach. He left after three years in 1963 and worked for Richmond Sausages as a van driver for two years. He was then employed as a bus driver for the West Yorkshire Road Car Company and after York won the 1983–84 Fourth Division championship he drove the open top bus that paraded the team around York. He resided in Haxby, North Yorkshire until his death in York, North Yorkshire on 6 April 2010 at the age of 90. His death was marked a day later by a minute's applause before York's game at home to AFC Wimbledon, which the team won 5–0.

== Style of play ==
Storey played as a left-sided inside forward and has been described as a "ball-player", a "little gem" and a "creative spark". He was held in "great esteem" by York fans due to his ball work and vision. Following his death, it was said that "it will be for his jinking skills and sweet left foot that he will always be remembered".
