= Wombwell F.C. =

Wombwell
- Full name: Wombwell Football Club
- Founded: 1920
- Dissolved: 1934
- Ground: Hough Lane
1920–27 colours	1927–34 colours

Wombwell F.C. was an English football club located in Wombwell, Barnsley, South Yorkshire.

== History ==
The club was formed in 1920 and was the second senior team to represent the village, after Wombwell Town became defunct in the 1900s. Wombwell entered the Yorkshire League and the FA Cup in their inaugural season. After finishing in second place in their first season they moved to the Midland League.

Wombwell spent 12 seasons in the Midland League, in which time they won the Sheffield & Hallamshire Senior Cup and reached the 1st round of the FA Cup in 1930, being knocked out by Wellington Town the current Telford Utd, 3–0 after a replay.

However the club had long struggled with finances and only survived a winding up petition over a debt of £369 with directors agreeing to forgo the money the club owed to them. The club therefore looked to become a nursery club with a more established side, and, after reaching an accommodation with Sheffield Wednesday, changed colours to suit.

In 1934, with debts of £1,969, assets of £18, and a ground repossessed in lieu of outstanding rent, the club withdrew from the Midland League and dissolved; the motion was put by Councillor Pascoe, who had scored the club's first Midland League goal.

=== League and cup history ===
Wombwell League and Cup history
Season	Division	Position	FA Cup
1920–21	Yorkshire League	2nd/13	2nd qualifying round
1921–22	Midland League	12th/22	5th qualifying round
1922–23	Midland League	15th/22	Preliminary round
1923–24	Midland League	18th/22	1st qualifying round
1924–25	Midland League	15th/15	2nd qualifying round
1925–26	Midland League	12th/21	1st qualifying round
1926–27	Midland League	19th/20	1st qualifying round
1927–28	Midland League	20th/23	Preliminary round
1928–29	Midland League	25th/26	Preliminary round
1929–30	Midland League	21st/26	2nd qualifying round
1930–31	Midland League	23rd/24	1st round
1931–32	Midland League	20th/24	1st qualifying round
1932–33	Midland League	23rd/23	1st qualifying round

== Colours ==
The club originally wore white shirts, black shorts, and black socks. In 1927 the club changed its jerseys to blue and white stripes due to its affiliation with Sheffield Wednesday, which it retained after the relationship came to an end.

== Ground ==
The club's ground, officially termed Hough Lane, was opposite Winder's Place, with an extra entrance via the allotments on Summer Lane. One locally famous supporter was the "Chocolate Boy", E. Merriweather, who used to sell sweets from a tray hung around his neck at every home game.

== Honours ==
=== Cup ===
- Sheffield & Hallamshire Senior Cup
  - Winners (1): 1922–23

== Records ==
- Best FA Cup performance: 1st round, 1930–31
