= Darfield F.C. =

Darfield
- Full name: Darfield Football Club
- Founded: (as Darfield St. Georges)

Darfield F.C. was an English association football club based in Darfield, South Yorkshire.

== History ==
The club was formed as Darfield St. George's, and competed in the FA Cup under that name in 1919. The following summer they changed their name to Houghton Main Colliery and reached the 3rd Qualifying Round of the cup before winning the Yorkshire League in their debut campaign in the competition.

In 1923 they left the Yorkshire League and joined the Barnsley Association League, being renamed simply Darfield in the process. Darfield won the Sheffield Senior Cup in 1927, beating Ecclesfield United in the final at Birdwell. A year later they finished top of the Barnsley league, but the club was wound up in 1932.

A new club using Darfield's old name, Houghton Main, was founded after the Second World War and currently (2016) competes in the Sheffield & Hallamshire County Senior League.

== Records ==
- Best FA Cup performance: 3rd Qualifying Round, 1920–21
