= Micklefield Welfare F.C. =

Micklefield Welfare
- Full name: Micklefield Welfare Football Club

Micklefield Welfare F.C. was an English football club located in Micklefield, Leeds, Yorkshire.

== History ==
The club joined the Yorkshire League in 1966, and spent three seasons in the competition's Second Division before re-joining local football.

== Records ==
- Best League performance: 7th, Yorkshire League Division 2, 1967–68
