= Wakefield City F.C. =

Wakefield City
- Full name: Wakefield City Football Club

Wakefield City F.C. was an English football club.

== History ==
The club were members of the Yorkshire League in the 1920–21 season before joining the Midland League. After finishing second bottom of the Midland League they returned to the Yorkshire League. They resigned in 1928.

They also competed in the FA Cup in 1907 and 1921, reaching the 2nd Qualifying Round in the latter campaign. Following this modest FA Cup success, City applied for election to the Football League upon creation of Division Three (North), but received only four votes and did not apply again.
