= Acomb F.C. =

Acomb
- Full name: Acomb Football Club

Acomb F.C. was an English football club from Acomb, North Yorkshire.

== History ==
The club was formed in the 1880s, and was a founder member of the York Football League in 1897 and the Yorkshire League in 1920.

They left the Yorkshire League after just three years but remained active and produced many players of repute, including George Lee, who signed for York City in 1936 and went on to win the FA Cup with West Bromwich Albion in 1954.
