= East End Park Working Mens Club F.C. =

Association football club in Leeds, England

East End Park WMC
- Full name: East End Park Working Mens Club Football Club
- Founded: 1921
- Dissolved: 2002 (reformed 2004)
- League: Yorkshire Amateur League Division Two
- 2024–25: Yorkshire Amateur League Division Two (withdrew)

East End Park Working Mens Club Football Club is a football club based in East End Park, Leeds, West Yorkshire, England. They withdrew from the Yorkshire Amateur Football League in 2025 after moving from the West Yorkshire Football League in 2023.

== History ==
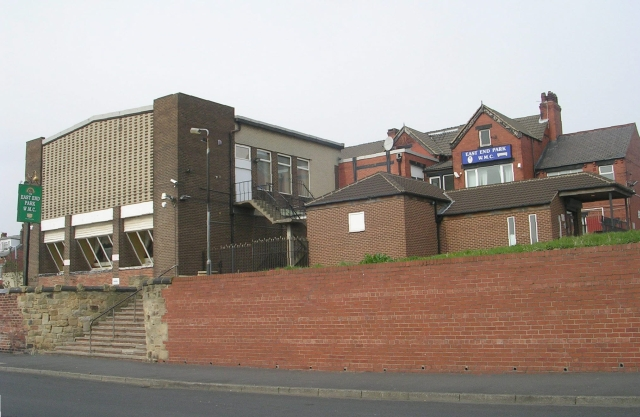
East End Park Working Mens Club building

The club won the Yorkshire Football League Division 2 title in 1958.. They played at Skelton Road.
