= Wombwell Town F.C. (1890s) =

Wombwell Town
- Full name: Wombwell Town Football Club
- Founded: 1890s
- Dissolved: 1900s

Wombwell Town F.C. was an English football club located in Wombwell, Barnsley, South Yorkshire.

== History ==
The club was formed in the early 1890s and entered their first league in 1895 when joining the Sheffield Challenge Cup League, before moving onto the Sheffield Association League and entering the FA Cup for the first time in 1896.

They entered, and won, the Yorkshire League in the 1898–99 season before returning to the Association League. The club became defunct in the early 1900s.

=== League and cup history ===
Wombwell Town (1890s) League and Cup history
Season	Division	Position	FA Cup
1895–96	Sheffield Challenge Cup League		–
1896–97	Sheffield Association League		1st qualifying round
1897–98	Sheffield Association League		2nd qualifying round
1898–99	Yorkshire League	1st/10	2nd qualifying round
1899–1900	Sheffield Association League		2nd qualifying round
1900–01	Sheffield Association League		1st qualifying round
1901–02	Sheffield Association League		–

== Honours ==
=== League ===
- Yorkshire League
  - Champions: 1898–99

=== Cup ===
None

== Records ==
- Best FA Cup performance: 2nd qualifying round, 1897–98, 1898–99, 1899–1900
