= Ossett Albion A.F.C. =

Coordinates: 53°40′28.110″N 1°35′0.398″W

Ossett Albion
- Full name: Ossett Albion; Association Football Club
- Nicknames: The Albion, The Golds, The Unicorns
- Founded: 1944
- Dissolved: 2018 (merged with Ossett Town to form Ossett United)
- Ground: Queen's Terrace, Ossett
Home colours	Away colours

Ossett Albion Association Football Club was an English football club. They played at Queen's Terrace in Ossett, in West Yorkshire, more commonly known as Dimplewells, the area of Ossett the ground is situated in.

== History ==
The club was formed in 1944 as a junior club, eventually they became a senior club and played in the West Riding County Amateur League and the West Yorkshire League, winning numerous honours before joining the Yorkshire League in 1957.

Albion won promotion from Division 2 in 1959 and were runner up to League champions Farsley Celtic in 1960. Albion were runners up again in 1962 to champions Stocksbridge Works. Albion continued to get regular top 4 places for several years afterwards but in 1972 they were relegated to Division 2. Albion won promotion in 1974 and finally won the Yorkshire League title in 1975. However, Albion went down again in 1978, but bounced back as Division 2 champions in 1979. Albion suffered yet another relegation in 1980, but again won the Division 2 title in 1981.

In 1982, the Yorkshire League joined up with the Midland League to form the Northern Counties East Football League. Ossett Albion were placed in Division 1 East, league re-organisations moved them into Division 1 Central in 1984 and Division 1 in 1985. Albion were Division 1 champions in 1987 and were promoted to the Premier Division. They finished bottom the first two seasons, but avoided relegation and eventually they began to climb the table. Albion, with Gerry Quinn as manager, were League champions in 1999, but were denied promotion to the Northern Premier League Division One due to one of their changing rooms not being big enough. In 2001, with Eric Gilchrist in charge, Albion finished 2nd to Brigg Town but were promoted to the Northern Premier League Division One instead of Brigg.

Ossett Albion finished bottom of the division in 2002 and they were relegated back to the Northern Counties East League but in 2004 Albion were champions again on a dramatic final day of the season, they pipped Eastwood Town to the Northern Counties East Premier Division title by virtue of scoring the more goals with the two clubs locked on the same number of points and also with the same goal difference, returning to the Northern Premier Division One.

2016–17 was Albion's 13th in the Northern Premier League Division One and their fortunes in recent campaigns fluctuated considerably. Twice the club finished just outside the play-off positions, they also had a few seasons struggling against relegation and in 2013–14 only a late reprieve rescued their status at this level.

Albion first entered the FA Cup in 1962–63, winning their first game 5–1 at Selby Town. They have reached the 4th Qualifying Round on three occasions, in 1965–66 they defeated Bridlington Town, Harrogate Town and Bridlington Trinity before losing 3–0 to South Liverpool away. In 2003–04, Albion beat Alnwick Town, Alsager Town, Ossett Town, Pickering Town and Newcastle Town before losing 1–0 at home to Stalybridge Celtic. In 2012–13, Albion beat Hebburn Town, Farsley, North Ferriby United, and Hinckley United before losing 4–1 away to Bradford Park Avenue.

In the FA Trophy, Albion have reached the 1st round twice, in 2002 and 2005.

In the FA Vase, Albion reached the 4th round in 1982, 1995, and 2000.

Albion first entered the FA Amateur Cup in 1952, beating Hull Old Grammarians 2–0. Their best performances, to get to the 1st round proper, were in 1962 (losing to Crook 1–0), 1968 (losing to North Shields 3–0) and 1973 (losing to Oldbury United 1–0). Albion's biggest win was 10–2 over Reckitts and Sons. Albion's last game in the Amateur Cup was a 3–1 defeat at North Ferriby United. The FA Amateur Cup was discontinued in 1974 and replaced by the FA Vase.

Albion have won the West Riding County Cup in 1965, 1966, 1968, and 1999, the Yorkshire League Cup in 1976 and 1977 and the Northern Counties East Football League Cup in 1984, beating Ilkeston 2–1, and 2003, beating Sheffield 3–0.

Albion's all-time record appearances holder is Peter Eaton, who made over 800 appearances during the 1970s and 1980s. Albion's record goalscorer is John Balmer, who hit over 40 goals in consecutive seasons during Jimmy Martin's reign in the early 1990s.

A number of former Ossett Albion players progressed into the Football League including Ian Ironside who went to Middlesbrough, Gary Brook who joined Newport County in 1987, Chris Cornelly who joined Lincoln City, Steve Downes who joined Grimbsy Town, Barry Holmes who went to Halifax Town, Shane Killock who joined Huddersfield Town, and Dave Syers, who began his career with Ossett Albion, turned professional two seasons later with Bradford City. Players who represented Ossett Albion after their professional careers ended include ex-Cambridge United striker Micky Norbury, John Balmer who also played for Cambridge United, Fulham midfielder Robert Wilson, former Swansea City player Paul Raynor, and former Huddersfield Town defender Rob Edwards.

Current Albion defender, Dominic Riordan, was appointed chairman on 25 June 2014.

Ex-Everton and England U18 youth player George Green signed for Ossett Albion in November 2015 after voluntarily terminating his contract at Oldham Athletic. He made 4 league appearances for the club before signing for Championship team Burnley in January 2016.

In September 2017, the founders and directors of Unita, a local based facilities management company, took the reins at Ossett Albion in a move which sees the club inherit a ready-made football academy with 150 players currently enrolled. This saw Huddersfield Town's former head of youth development Dave Haley take over as first team manager and Andy Welsh former Sunderland midfielder become head coach. Phil Smith (ex Sheffield Wednesday Academy coach) will provide support and oversee the running of the academy.

In 2018, it was announced that Ossett Albion and Ossett Town would merge to form Ossett United.

== Honours ==
- Yorkshire League Division One
  - Champions: 1974–75
- Yorkshire League Division Two
  - Champions: 1978–79, 1980–81
  - Promoted: 1958–59, 1973–74
- Yorkshire League Cup
  - Champions: 1975–76, 1976–77
  - Runners-Up: 1960–61, 1962–63
- Northern Counties East Football League Premier Division
  - Champions: 1998–99, 2003–04
  - Promoted: 2000–01
- Northern Counties East Football League Division One
  - Champions: 1986–87
- Northern Counties East Football League Cup
  - Champions: 1983–4, 2002–03
  - Runners-Up: 1995–96
- West Riding County Cup
  - Champions: 1965, 1966, 1968, 1999. (twice more, and 17 years more recently than Ossett Town A.F.C.)

== Records ==
- Best league position: Sixth in the Northern Premier League Division One North, 2007–08, 2008–09
- Best FA Cup performance: Fourth Qualifying Round, 1965–66, 2003–04, 2012–13
- Best FA Trophy performance: First round, 2001–02, 2004–05
- Best FA Vase performance: Fourth Round, 1981–82, 1994–95, 1999–00
- Record attendance: 1,200 vs Leeds United, friendly, 1986
