= Swillington Miners Welfare F.C. =

English football club

Swillington Miners Welfare
- Full name: Swillington Miners Welfare Football Club

Swillington Miners Welfare F.C. was an English football club in Swillington, Leeds, Yorkshire.

== History ==
The club joined the Yorkshire League in 1961 and won promotion as Division Two runners-up in their first season. They were relegated back to Division Two after one season in the top flight, but a second promotion followed in 1963.

After a season of consolidation, Swillington finished as Yorkshire League runners-up in 1965, missing out on the Division One title by one point.

After that season, the club withdrew from the competition.

== Honours ==
- Yorkshire League Division 2
  - Promoted: 1960–61, 1962–63

== Records ==
- Best League performance: 2nd, Yorkshire League Division 1, 1964–65
