= Hunslet F.C. (association football) =

Hunslet
- Full name: Hunslet Club Football Club
- Nickname(s): Twinklers
- Founded: 1889
- Dissolved: 1902

Hunslet Football Club was an association football club from Hunslet, West Yorkshire, England.

== History ==
The club was established in 1889 by employees of Leeds Steelworks. In 1894 they joined the West Yorkshire League, and were renamed Hunslet Football Club. The club reached the quarter-finals of the FA Amateur Cup in 1895–96, and the following season saw them win the West Yorkshire Cup. In 1897 they were founder members of the Yorkshire League. The club retained the West Yorkshire Cup in 1897–98, beating Harrogate 1–0 in the final at Elland Road on 23 April 1898, the first competitive football game played at the ground. They went on to retain the cup again in both of the next two seasons. In 1900–01 they were quarter-finalists in the Amateur Cup for a second time. During this period the club also won the Leeds Workpeople's Hospital Cup on four occasions.

After the Yorkshire League folded the club were set to join a re-established West Yorkshire League. However, after failing to secure a lease on their Nelson Ground, the club suspended playing activities in 1902. Several former club members went on to be involved in the formation of Leeds City in 1904.

== Ground ==
The club initially played at the Wellington Ground on Low Road and then Parkside, before moving to the Nelson Ground in Low Road.

== Honours ==
- West Yorkshire Cup
  - Winners: 1896–97, 1897–98, 1898–99, 1899–1900
- Leeds Workpeople's Hospital Cup
  - Winners: 1899–1900
