= 1965–66 FA Cup qualifying rounds =

Tournament details
- Country: England; Wales

The FA Cup 1965–66 is the 85th season of the world's oldest football knockout competition; The Football Association Challenge Cup, or FA Cup for short. The large number of clubs entering the tournament from lower down the English football league system meant that the competition started with a number of preliminary and qualifying rounds. The 30 victorious teams from the fourth round qualifying progressed to the first round proper.

== 1st qualifying round ==
=== Ties ===
Tie	Home team	Score	Away team
1	Arnold	1–1	Matlock Town
2	Ashington	3–1	West Auckland Town
3	Ashton United	2–4	St Helens Town
4	Aylesbury United	3–3	Huntley & Palmers
5	Banbury United	2–0	Chesham United
6	Basingstoke Town	6–0	Littlehampton Town
7	Belper Town	1–1	Buxton
8	Bexley United	6–2	Chatham Town
9	Billingham Synthonia	1–2	Whitby Town
10	Bilston	2–1	Rugby Town
11	Bishop Auckland	5–1	South Bank
12	Bishop's Stortford	1–1	Stevenage Town
13	Bletchley Town	3–2	Vauxhall Motors
14	Blyth Spartans	4–3	Ryhope Colliery Welfare
15	Boldon Colliery Welfare	2–1	Tow Law Town
16	Brentwood Town	0–2	Tilbury
17	Bridgwater Town	1–0	Taunton
18	Bridlington Trinity	3–2	Selby Town
19	Brierley Hill Alliance	1–1	Hednesford Town
20	Bromley	3–2	Erith & Belvedere
21	Burton Albion	1–0	Loughborough United
22	Cambridge City	8–1	Soham Town Rangers
23	Canterbury City	2–1	Ramsgate Athletic
24	Chatteris Town	2–3	Ely City
25	Chichester City	3–6	Cowes
26	Chippenham Town	5–1	Melksham Town
27	Chorley	6–0	Nelson
28	Cinderford Town	1–1	Merthyr Tydfil
29	Clapton	0–9	Leytonstone
30	Clitheroe	2–0	Lancaster City
31	Consett	7–0	Murton Colliery Welfare
32	Crawley Town	3–0	Haywards Heath
33	Cray Wanderers	0–1	Sheppey United
34	Dagenham	2–2	Ford United
35	Deal Town	2–2	Dover
36	Desborough Town	3–0	St Neots Town
37	Dorking	1–1	Walton & Hersham
38	Droylsden	3–3	Marine
39	Dudley Town	0–0	Wellington Town
40	Dulwich Hamlet	3–2	Tooting & Mitcham United
41	Durham City	0–8	Willington
42	Eastbourne	1–4	Tonbridge
43	Eastbourne United	0–4	Hastings United
44	Ellesmere Port Town	3–1	Runcorn
45	Eynesbury Rovers	0–2	Rothwell Town
46	Fareham Town	7–3	Alton Town
47	Farsley Celtic	0–1	Harrogate Town
48	Ferryhill Athletic	1–3	Stanley United
49	Folkestone	2–1	Margate
50	Gainsborough Trinity	1–0	Retford Town
51	Glastonbury	0–1	Frome Town
52	Gloucester City	1–0	Llanelli
53	Goole Town	4–2	Mexborough Town
54	Grantham	3–0	Spalding United
55	Grays Athletic	1–0	Hornchurch
56	Great Harwood	1–4	Hyde United
57	Great Yarmouth Town	6–4	Gorleston
58	Gresley Rovers	0–2	Ilkeston Town
59	Guildford City	3–2	Kingstonian
60	Harlow Town	3–1	Harrow Town
61	Harwich & Parkeston	2–2	Clacton Town
62	Hayes	1–2	Windsor & Eton
63	Heanor Town	5–3	Alfreton Town
64	Hemel Hempstead	6–0	Abingdon Town
65	Hertford Town	1–2	Wealdstone
66	Hillingdon Borough	1–2	Corinthian Casuals
67	Hitchin Town	4–1	Letchworth Town
68	Holbeach United	2–0	Louth United
69	Holyhead Town	0–2	New Brighton
70	Horsham	2–2	Sutton United
71	Horwich R M I	2–1	Burscough
72	Hounslow	2–3	Southall
73	Ilford	2–4	Barking
74	Kidderminster Harriers	3–0	Redditch
75	Lancing	3–1	Lewes
76	Leatherhead	3–3	Chertsey Town
77	Leyton	3–2	Woodford Town
78	Lockheed Leamington	3–1	Nuneaton Borough
79	Long Eaton United	7–2	Atherstone Town
80	Lovells Athletic	6–1	Barry Town
81	Lowestoft Town	10–2	Thetford Town
82	Lytham	2–0	Bacup Borough
83	Macclesfield	7–0	Winsford United
84	Maidstone United	4–0	Bexhill Town
85	March Town United	1–2	Bury Town
86	Marlow	0–4	Metropolitan Police
87	Milnthorpe Corinthians	1–7	Fleetwood
88	Morecambe	2–0	Penrith
89	Mossley	1–4	Northwich Victoria
90	Newport I O W	2–1	Bognor Regis Town
91	Norton Woodseats	0–3	Frickley Colliery
92	Ossett Albion	0–0	Bridlington Town
93	Oswestry Town	6–0	Congleton Town
94	Oxford City	5–2	Maidenhead United
95	Poole Town	3–2	Bridport
96	Portland United	4–1	Dorchester Town
97	Prescot Town	1–2	Altrincham
98	Redhill	2–2	Carshalton Athletic
99	Rhyl	1–1	Borough United
100	Rossendale United	3–2	Darwen
101	Ruislip Manor	1–5	Rainham Town
102	Rushden Town	4–4	Bourne Town
103	Salisbury	4–0	Newbury Town
104	Shildon	0–4	Horden Colliery Welfare
105	Sittingbourne	9–0	Faversham Town
106	Skegness Town	3–2	Boston United
107	Skelmersdale United	2–2	Leyland Motors
108	Slough Town	5–3	Wembley
109	Spennymoor United	2–0	North Shields
110	St Albans City	3–0	Dunstable Town
111	Stafford Rangers	1–1	Bromsgrove Rovers
112	Stamford	0–1	Boston
113	Stocksbridge Works	1–4	Denaby United
114	Stockton	3–0	Evenwood Town
115	Stonehouse	2–1	Abergavenny Thursdays
116	Stork	0–2	Colwyn Bay United
117	Stourbridge	8–0	Bedworth Town
118	Sudbury Town	3–0	Haverhill Rovers
119	Sutton Town	2–2	Worksop Town
120	Tamworth	1–1	Hinckley Athletic
121	Tunbridge Wells Rangers	4–1	Ashford Town (Kent)
122	Uxbridge	1–7	Finchley
123	Walthamstow Avenue	4–0	Aveley
124	Ware	3–1	Cheshunt
125	Warminster Town	0–4	Andover
126	Wellingborough Town	3–0	Biggleswade & District
127	Westbury United	1–3	Trowbridge Town
128	Weston Super Mare	2–1	Minehead
129	Whitley Bay	11–0	Annfield Plain
130	Whitstable	1–3	Herne Bay
131	Wisbech Town	5–1	Newmarket Town
132	Witton Albion	4–0	Stalybridge Celtic
133	Woking	9–0	Addlestone
134	Wokingham Town	6–0	Bracknell Town
135	Wolverton Town & B R	2–2	Amersham Town
136	Worcester City	4–2	Lower Gornal Athletic
137	Yorkshire Amateur	2–4	Hull Brunswick

=== Replays ===
Tie	Home team	Score	Away team
1	Matlock Town	2–2	Arnold (Abandoned in extra time)
4	Huntley & Palmers	1–0	Aylesbury United
7	Buxton	6–3	Belper Town
12	Stevenage Town	2–0	Bishop's Stortford
19	Hednesford Town	1–3	Brierley Hill Alliance
28	Merthyr Tydfil	4–0	Cinderford Town
34	Ford United	1–2	Dagenham
35	Dover	3–0	Deal Town
37	Walton & Hersham	4–1	Dorking
38	Marine	1–0	Droylsden
39	Wellington Town	1–2	Dudley Town
61	Clacton Town	0–5	Harwich & Parkeston
70	Sutton United	3–2	Horsham
76	Chertsey Town	2–5	Leatherhead
92	Bridlington Town	1–2	Ossett Albion
98	Carshalton Athletic	3–0	Redhill
99	Borough United	1–0	Rhyl
102	Bourne Town	4–1	Rushden Town
107	Leyland Motors	1–2	Skelmersdale United
111	Bromsgrove Rovers	1–2	Stafford Rangers
119	Worksop Town	6–2	Sutton Town
120	Hinckley Athletic	4–2	Tamworth
135	Amersham Town	0–2	Wolverton Town & B R

=== 2nd replay ===
Tie	Home team	Score	Away team
1	Arnold	1–2	Matlock Town

== 2nd qualifying round ==
=== Ties ===
Tie	Home team	Score	Away team
1	Altrincham	4–0	Marine
2	Andover	0–3	Salisbury
3	Barking	0–1	Grays Athletic
4	Basingstoke Town	0–2	Fareham Town
5	Bideford	2–2	Barnstaple Town
6	Bilston	0–1	Stourbridge
7	Bletchley Town	2–1	Wolverton Town & B R
8	Blyth Spartans	0–2	Horden Colliery Welfare
9	Boldon Colliery Welfare	1–1	Consett
10	Borough United	3–0	New Brighton
11	Bourne Town	3–1	Rothwell Town
12	Bridlington Trinity	6–0	Hull Brunswick
13	Bromley	0–2	Sittingbourne
14	Burton Albion	8–1	Hinckley Athletic
15	Bury Town	5–0	Ely City
16	Cambridge City	1–1	Wisbech Town
17	Canterbury City	1–0	Herne Bay
18	Cheltenham Town	4–1	Chippenham Town
19	Chorley	1–1	Rossendale United
20	Clitheroe	2–1	Morecambe
21	Cowes	3–3	Newport I O W
22	Desborough Town	1–2	Wellingborough Town
23	Devizes Town	3–2	Trowbridge Town
24	Dudley Town	0–3	Worcester City
25	Dulwich Hamlet	1–2	Wokingham Town
26	Ellesmere Port Town	1–2	Colwyn Bay United
27	Finchley	2–2	Southall
28	Folkestone	1–1	Dover
29	Frickley Colliery	1–3	Goole Town
30	Frome Town	1–1	Bridgwater Town
31	Gainsborough Trinity	4–1	Denaby United
32	Grantham	7–0	Boston
33	Heanor Town	5–1	Buxton
34	Hemel Hempstead	5–1	Banbury United
35	Horwich R M I	3–3	Fleetwood
36	Huntley & Palmers	1–4	Oxford City
37	Lancing	0–2	Carshalton Athletic
38	Leatherhead	2–2	Guildford City
39	Leyton	3–2	Dagenham
40	Leytonstone	5–0	Rainham Town
41	Lockheed Leamington	2–3	Brierley Hill Alliance
42	Long Eaton United	3–2	Ilkeston Town
43	Lovells Athletic	1–2	Gloucester City
44	Lowestoft Town	4–2	Great Yarmouth Town
45	Lytham	1–1	Hyde United
46	Macclesfield	9–0	Witton Albion
47	Maidstone United	1–5	Hastings United
48	Matlock Town	1–3	Worksop Town
49	Merthyr Tydfil	6–2	Stonehouse
50	Ossett Albion	1–1	Harrogate Town
51	Oswestry Town	3–1	Northwich Victoria
52	Poole Town	0–2	Portland United
53	Sheppey United	1–3	Bexley United
54	Skegness Town	2–2	Holbeach United
55	Slough Town	0–1	Metropolitan Police
56	Spennymoor United	0–0	Bishop Auckland
57	St Albans City	2–0	Hitchin Town
58	St Blazey	4–1	Falmouth Town
59	St Helens Town	0–3	Skelmersdale United
60	Stafford Rangers	0–2	Kidderminster Harriers
61	Stanley United	2–2	Whitley Bay
62	Stevenage Town	1–1	Ware
63	Stockton	3–1	Ashington
64	Sudbury Town	1–2	Harwich & Parkeston
65	Sutton United	0–1	Crawley Town
66	Tilbury	0–0	Walthamstow Avenue
67	Tonbridge	4–1	Tunbridge Wells Rangers
68	Walton & Hersham	0–4	Woking
69	Wealdstone	5–1	Harlow Town
70	Welton Rovers	1–1	Weston Super Mare
71	Willington	1–2	Whitby Town
72	Windsor & Eton	0–6	Corinthian Casuals

=== Replays ===
Tie	Home team	Score	Away team
5	Barnstaple Town	2–2	Bideford
9	Consett	5–0	Boldon Colliery Welfare
16	Wisbech Town	1–0	Cambridge City
19	Rossendale United	0–3	Chorley
21	Newport I O W	0–3	Cowes
27	Southall	2–1	Finchley
28	Dover	2–3	Folkestone
30	Bridgwater Town	0–1	Frome Town
35	Fleetwood	2–1	Horwich R M I
38	Guildford City	3–0	Leatherhead
45	Hyde United	4–0	Lytham
50	Harrogate Town	2–3	Ossett Albion
54	Holbeach United	0–1	Skegness Town
56	Bishop Auckland	1–4	Spennymoor United
61	Whitley Bay	1–0	Stanley United
62	Walthamstow Avenue	5–4	Tilbury
66	Stevenage Town	4–1	Ware
70	Weston Super Mare	0–3	Welton Rovers

=== 2nd replay ===
Tie	Home team	Score	Away team
5	Bideford	4–1	Barnstaple Town (@ Exeter City)

== 3rd qualifying round ==
=== Ties ===
Tie	Home team	Score	Away team
1	Altrincham	4–1	Skelmersdale United
2	Bexley United	4–2	Sittingbourne
3	Borough United	1–1	Colwyn Bay United
4	Bourne Town	2–2	Wellingborough Town
5	Brierley Hill Alliance	1–2	Stourbridge
6	Bury Town	0–3	Wisbech Town
7	Consett	2–0	Stockton
8	Crawley Town	3–0	Carshalton Athletic
9	Devizes Town	2–8	Cheltenham Town
10	Fareham Town	4–2	Cowes
11	Fleetwood	3–1	Clitheroe
12	Folkestone	1–0	Canterbury City
13	Gloucester City	1–1	Merthyr Tydfil
14	Goole Town	3–4	Gainsborough Trinity
15	Grays Athletic	1–3	Walthamstow Avenue
16	Guildford City	6–0	Woking
17	Harwich & Parkeston	4–2	Lowestoft Town
18	Hastings United	1–1	Tonbridge
19	Heanor Town	3–2	Worksop Town
20	Hemel Hempstead	0–1	Oxford City
21	Horden Colliery Welfare	1–0	Whitley Bay
22	Hyde United	1–1	Chorley
23	Kidderminster Harriers	2–2	Worcester City
24	Leyton	0–3	Leytonstone
25	Long Eaton United	1–2	Burton Albion
26	Metropolitan Police	3–2	Wokingham Town
27	Ossett Albion	2–0	Bridlington Trinity
28	Oswestry Town	3–2	Macclesfield
29	Salisbury	0–3	Portland United
30	Skegness Town	0–7	Grantham
31	Southall	2–2	Corinthian Casuals
32	St Albans City	0–1	Bletchley Town
33	St Blazey	2–2	Bideford
34	Wealdstone	6–5	Stevenage Town
35	Welton Rovers	4–1	Frome Town
36	Whitby Town	4–3	Spennymoor United

=== Replays ===
Tie	Home team	Score	Away team
3	Colwyn Bay United	2–1	Borough United
4	Wellingborough Town	3–2	Bourne Town
13	Merthyr Tydfil	1–1	Gloucester City
18	Tonbridge	3–1	Hastings United
22	Chorley	4–1	Hyde United
23	Worcester City	1–2	Kidderminster Harriers
31	Corinthian Casuals	3–2	Southall
33	Bideford	3–2	St Blazey

=== 2nd replay ===
Tie	Home team	Score	Away team
13	Gloucester City	0–1	Merthyr Tydfil

== 4th qualifying round ==
The teams that given byes to this round are Crook Town, Enfield, Wimbledon, Gateshead, Wycombe Wanderers, Yeovil Town, Hereford United, South Shields, King's Lynn, Chelmsford City, Bath City, Kettering Town, Weymouth, Romford, Bedford Town, Cambridge United, Wigan Athletic, Scarborough, Bangor City, Netherfield, Corby Town, Dartford, South Liverpool and Gravesend & Northfleet

=== Ties ===
Tie	Home team	Score	Away team
1	Bangor City	3–3	Altrincham
2	Bath City	3–1	Welton Rovers
3	Burton Albion	3–2	Gainsborough Trinity
4	Cambridge United	1–2	Bedford Town
5	Cheltenham Town	0–1	Hereford United
6	Corby Town	2–1	King's Lynn
7	Enfield	0–3	Corinthian Casuals
8	Fareham Town	0–3	Wimbledon
9	Fleetwood	2–1	Colwyn Bay United
10	Folkestone	4–1	Bexley United
11	Gateshead	3–1	Horden Colliery Welfare
12	Grantham	4–4	Heanor Town
13	Gravesend & Northfleet	1–0	Crawley Town
14	Guildford City	4–0	Bletchley Town
15	Metropolitan Police	2–3	Wycombe Wanderers
16	Oswestry Town	3–4	Kidderminster Harriers
17	Portland United	1–1	Yeovil Town
18	Romford	2–1	Chelmsford City
19	Scarborough	3–1	Netherfield
20	South Liverpool	3–0	Ossett Albion
21	South Shields	3–0	Consett
22	Stourbridge	1–3	Merthyr Tydfil
23	Tonbridge	0–0	Dartford
24	Walthamstow Avenue	2–5	Leytonstone
25	Wealdstone	2–0	Oxford City
26	Wellingborough Town	1–0	Harwich & Parkeston
27	Weymouth	1–1	Bideford
28	Whitby Town	1–1	Crook Town
29	Wigan Athletic	4–0	Chorley
30	Wisbech Town	6–1	Kettering Town

=== Replays ===
Tie	Home team	Score	Away team
1	Altrincham	3–2	Bangor City
12	Heanor Town	1–2	Grantham
17	Yeovil Town	1–0	Portland United
23	Dartford	6–2	Tonbridge
27	Bideford	1–3	Weymouth
28	Crook Town	4–1	Whitby Town

== 1965–66 FA Cup ==
See 1965-66 FA Cup for details of the rounds from the first round proper onwards.
