= Yorkshire Football League =

The Yorkshire Football League was the name of two football competitions. The first lasted three seasons in the late 19th century and the second lasted 62 years until merging with the Midland League in 1982 to become the Northern Counties East League.

== Yorkshire League (1897–1900) ==
Yorkshire Football League
- Founded: 1897
- Folded: 1900
- Country: England
- Number of clubs: 10

=== History ===
The original league was founded in 1897, and featured ten teams, however it only lasted for two seasons and was dissolved by the end of 1900. It is generally not viewed as the same competition as that which emerged in the 1920s.

During the three years of its existence, the original Yorkshire league was won first by Sheffield United reserves and then in 1898–99 Wombwell were champions. The competition took place before many of the more well known clubs of today were formed, for example it featured a team from Leeds, which predated both Leeds City and Leeds United. The same could be said for the Huddersfield, Halifax, and Bradford sides.

=== Honours ===
==== League winners ====
Season	Champions
1897–98	Sheffield United reserves
1898–99	Wombwell
1899–1900	Huddersfield & Hunslet (shared)

== Yorkshire League (1920–1982) ==
Yorkshire Football League
- Founded: 1920
- Country: England
- Divisions: Single division (1920–1949); Division One (1949–1982); Division Two (1949–1982); Division Three (1961–1964 & 1970–1982)

=== History ===
The second Yorkshire League was formed in 1920, catering for a mixture of semi-professional and amateur local football teams. Some of the Football League clubs entered their reserve sides and third teams.

The first champions were Bradford Park Avenue reserves. They were the only reserve outfit in the league during that inaugural season, but their success in the Yorkshire League induced other bigger clubs to sign their reserves up for inclusion for the following seasons.

The league originally consisted of a single section of 13 clubs, and although numbers rose and fell, by 1935 had reached a stable membership of 20 clubs. However, the league ceased operations in 1939 on the outbreak of World War II. For the 1931–32 and 1932–33 seasons, the number of clubs competing was so small that two separate competitions were organised, with the winners of the first competition playing the winners of the second competition for the league championship.

No club dominated the league in particular before World War II, with Selby Town the only team who won successive titles in 1934–35 and 1935–36. Bradford Park Avenue reserves along with Selby Town remained the overall most successful however, with three titles each to their names. There were only six seasons where the title was not competed for, this was during part of the 1940s when, due to World War II, many of the players in football competitions all over the country were called up to fight and thus the leagues were put on hold.

After the War, the league resumed for the 1945–46 season, and within five years had enough clubs to form two divisions, entitled Division One and Division Two. This pattern continued until 1961, when a third division was formed (although that only lasted three seasons, and then lay dormant until revived for the 1970–71 season).

Stocksbridge Works became the dominant force in the Yorkshire League of the 1950s. They were founder members of Division Two and won that league in its second season, gaining promotion. In their début year in the top division they took the title. After a two-year hiatus, when Selby Town again completed a double, Stocksbridge won the Championship for four consecutive seasons, a record which stood until the league's demise. After their sustained period of success, Stocksbridge became a "yo-yo club," spending short periods in Divisions One and Two, and also dipped down to Division Three for a single season.

The league ran until 1981–82, when it merged with the Midland League to form the Northern Counties East League.

=== Honours ===
==== League winners ====
Season	
1920–21	Bradford Park Avenue reserves
1921–22	Houghton Main
1922–23	Bradford Park Avenue reserves
1923–24	Methley Perseverance
1924–25	Brodsworth Main
1925–26	Methley Perseverance
1926–27	Harrogate
1927–28	Goole Town
1928–29	Bradford Park Avenue reserves
1929–30	Bradford City reserves
1930–31	Leeds United "A"
1931–32	Huddersfield Town "A"
1932–33	Selby Town
1933–34	Huddersfield Town "A"
1934–35	Selby Town
1935–36	Selby Town
1936–37	Selby Town
1937–38	York City reserves
1938–39	Sheffield Wednesday "A"
1939–40	Competition suspended due to World War II
1940–41	Competition suspended due to World War II
1941–42	Competition suspended due to World War II
1942–43	Competition suspended due to World War II
1943–44	Competition suspended due to World War II
1944–45	Competition suspended due to World War II
1945–46	Wombwell Athletic
1946–47	Thorne Colliery
1947–48	Goole Town
1948–49	Sheffield United "A"

Season	Division One	Division Two
1949–50	Goole Town reserves	Retford Town reserves
1950–51	Sheffield Wednesday "A"	Stocksbridge Works
1951–52	Stocksbridge Works	Farsley Celtic
1952–53	Selby Town	Huddersfield Town "A"
1953–54	Selby Town	Rawmarsh Welfare
1954–55	Stocksbridge Works	Hull City "A"
1955–56	Stocksbridge Works	Rawmarsh Welfare
1956–57	Stocksbridge Works	Retford Town
1957–58	Stocksbridge Works	East End Park WMC
1958–59	Retford Town	Yorkshire Amateur
1959–60	Farsley Celtic	Grimethorpe Miners Welfare
1960–61	Sheffield Wednesday "A"	Hallam

Season	Division One	Division Two	Division Three
1961–62	Stocksbridge Works	Bridlington Trinity	Farsley Celtic reserves
1962–63	Stocksbridge Works	Wombwell Sporting Association	Farsley Celtic reserves
1963–64	Bridlington Trinity	Rawmarsh Welfare	Keighley Central

Season	Division One	Division Two
1964–65	Wombwell Sporting Association	Stocksbridge Works
1965–66	Wombwell Sporting Association	Norton Woodseats
1966–67	Bridlington Trinity	Hull Brunswick
1967–68	Bridlington Trinity	Lincoln United
1968–69	Farsley Celtic	Rawmarsh Welfare
1969–70	Rawmarsh Welfare	Dinnington Athletic

Season	Division One	Division Two	Division Three
1970–71	Lincoln United	North Ferriby United	Stocksbridge Works
1971–72	Winterton Rangers	Barton Town	Leeds Ashley Road
1972–73	Mexborough Town	Leeds & Carnegie College	Hall Road Rangers
1973–74	Lincoln United	Thackley	Pickering Town
1974–75	Ossett Albion	Bridlington Town	Stocksbridge Works
1975–76	Emley	Guiseley	Rawmarsh Welfare
1976–77	Winterton Rangers	Sheffield	Bentley Victoria Welfare
1977–78	Emley	Kiveton Park	Yorkshire Amateur
1978–79	Winterton Rangers	Ossett Albion	York Railway Institute
1979–80	Emley	Barton Town	Hall Road Rangers
1980–81	Leeds Ashley Road	Ossett Albion	Bradley Rangers
1981–82	Emley	Harrogate Town	Pontefract Collieries

==== League Cup finals ====
Season	Winner	Result	Runner-up	Venue
1932–33	Yorkshire Amateur	4–2	Huddersfield Town 'A'	Victoria Pleasure Grounds
1933–34	Goole Town	4–2	Thorne Colliery	Victoria Pleasure Grounds
1934–35	Halifax Town reserves	4–0	South Kirkby Colliery	The Shay
1935–36	Competition not completed			
1936–37	Leeds United 'A'	2–1	Selby Town	Victoria Pleasure Grounds
1937–38	Selby Town	3–1	Thorne Colliery	Victoria Pleasure Grounds
1938–39	Barnsley 'A'	2–1	Leeds United 'A'	Victoria Pleasure Grounds
1939–40	Competition suspended due to World War II			
1940–41	Competition suspended due to World War II			
1941–42	Competition suspended due to World War II			
1942–43	Competition suspended due to World War II			
1943–44	Competition suspended due to World War II			
1944–45	Competition suspended due to World War II			
1945–46	Wombwell Athletic	6–1	Goole Town	James Street
1946–47	York City reserves	4–0	Leeds United 'A'	Boothferry Park
1947–48	South Kirkby Colliery	2–1	Halifax Town reserves	Victoria Pleasure Grounds
1948–49	Goole Town reserves	1–0	Sheffield United 'A'	Boothferry Park
1949–50	Scarborough reserves	3–0	Scunthorpe & Lindsey United reserves	Boothferry Park
1950–51	Sheffield Wednesday 'A'	3–0	Farsley Celtic	Hillsborough
1951–52	Goole Town reserves	1–0	Farsley Celtic	Flaxley Road
1952–53	Goole Town reserves	3–1	Sheffield	Flaxley Road
1953–54	Selby Town	2–1	Ossett Town	Victoria Pleasure Grounds
1954–55	Selby Town	2–0	Retford Town	Bramall Lane
1955–56	Salts (Saltaire)	3–1	Halifax Town reserves	Hirst Lane
1956–57	Sheffield Wednesday 'A'	4–1	Barnsley 'A'	Hillsborough
1957–58	Salts (Saltaire)	3–0	Ossett Town	Throstle Nest
1958–59	Sheffield United 'A'	2–0	Ossett Town	Skelton Road
1959–60	Bridlington Town	3–0	Sheffield Wednesday 'A'	Athletic Ground
1960–61	Bridlington Town	1–0	Ossett Albion	Victoria Pleasure Grounds
1961–62	Stocksbidge Works	3–1	Harrogate Town	Skelton Road
1962–63	Selby Town	2–0	Ossett Albion	Elland Road
1963–64	Farsley Celtic	5–3	Harrogate Railway Athletic	
1964–65	Bridlington Trinity	4–2	Scarborough reserves	
1965–66	Bridlington Town	2–1	Hallam	Tickhill Square
1966–67	Farsley Celtic	3–0	Bridlington Trinity	
1967–68	Bridlington Trinity	2–1	Hull Brunswick	
1968–69	Rawmarsh Welfare	1–0	Farsley Celtic	
1969–70	Emley	2–0	Rawmarsh Welfare	
1970–71	Lincoln United	3–1	Mexborough Town	
1971–72	Denaby United	1–0	Barton Town	Belle Vue
1972–73	Mexborough Town	2–1	Hatfield Main	
1973–74	Redfearn National Glass	3–0	Barton Town	
1974–75	North Ferriby United	2–0	Lincoln United	
1975–76	Ossett Albion	2–0	Scarborough reserves	
1976–77	Ossett Albion	3–1	Emley	
1977–78	Sheffield	4–1	Maltby Miners Welfare	
1978–79	Emley	1–0	Winterton Rangers	Westfield Lane
1979–80	Guiseley	1–0	Emley	
1980–81	Winterton Rangers	2–0	Emley	Tickhill Square
1981–82	Emley	2–0	Frecheville Community	Woolley Colliery Road
