= Rawmarsh Welfare F.C. =

Rawmarsh Welfare
- Full name: Rawmarsh Welfare Football Club
- Dissolved: 1982
- Ground: Dale Road

Rawmarsh Welfare F.C. was an English football club located in Rawmarsh, Rotherham, South Yorkshire.

== History ==
The club was formed in 1910 as Horse & Jockey, and initially played in the Rotherham Licensed Victuallers League before moving on to the Sheffield Association League and renaming themselves as Rawmarsh Town.

After the First World War finished, the club was again renamed, this time to Rawmarsh Athletic, but this name too would not last long as Rawmarsh Welfare was soon settled upon, and the club started to gain success on the pitch. They won the Association League for the first time in 1936, and three years later they secured a league and cup double by winning their second league title and the prestigious Sheffield & Hallamshire Senior Cup – beating Worksop Town in the final.

A third Association League title was won soon after the Second World War in 1951, and a year later they reached the 1st round of the FA Cup for the first and only time – losing 1–4 to Buxton at their Dale Road home.

In 1953 Rawmarsh joined the Yorkshire League, and won the Division 2 title at the first attempt. They stayed in the Yorkshire League for nearly 30 years and built up a reputation as a yo-yo club – continually being promoted and relegated between Divisions 1 and 2 during the 1950s, and between Divisions 2 and 3 in the 1970s and 1980s. They won the Division Two title a record four times, and won the Yorkshire League title for the only time in 1970.

In 1982 the club disbanded after finishing near the foot of Division 3 for the first time – having previously won promotion from the division on three occasions only to be relegated straight back again.

=== Notable former players ===
Players that played in the Football League either before or after being with Rawmarsh Welfare –

- Gordon Banks
- Wally Gould
- Jack Haigh
- Harold Mosby

=== League and cup history ===
Rawmarsh Welfare League and Cup history
Season	Division	Position	FA Cup	FA Amateur Cup	FA Vase
1911–12	Sheffield Association League		-	-	-
1912–13			Extra preliminary round	-	-
1913–14			Preliminary round	-	-
1914–15			Preliminary round	-	-
1920–21			Extra preliminary round	-	-
1921–22			Preliminary round	-	-
1922–23			Preliminary round	-	-
1927–28			-	1st round	-
1928–29			-	4th qualifying round	-
1929–30			-	2nd round	-
1930–31			1st qualifying round	3rd round	-
1931–32			3rd qualifying round	2nd round	-
1932–33			2nd qualifying round	1st round	-
1933–34			4th qualifying round	3rd round	-
1934–35			1st qualifying round	1st round	-
1935–36	Sheffield Association League	1st	2nd qualifying round	-	-
1936–37			Extra preliminary round	-	-
1937–38			Preliminary round	3rd qualifying round	-
1938–39	Sheffield Association League	1st	1st qualifying round	1st round	-
1945–46	Sheffield Association League Division 2		4th qualifying round	2nd round	-
1946–47			2nd qualifying round	1st round	-
1947–48	Sheffield Association League	/20	1st qualifying round	4th qualifying round	-
1948–49	Sheffield Association League	/18	Preliminary round	1st qualifying round	-
1949–50			4th qualifying round	-	-
1950–51	Sheffield Association League	1st	Preliminary round	1st round	-
1951–52			1st round	1st round	-
1952–53			2nd qualifying round	4th qualifying round	-
1953–54	Yorkshire League Division 2	1st/16	1st qualifying round	3rd qualifying round	-
1954–55	Yorkshire League Division 1	18th/18	3rd qualifying round	2nd qualifying round	-
1955–56	Yorkshire League Division 2	1st/16	-	2nd qualifying round	-
1956–57	Yorkshire League Division 1	14th/18	-	-	-
1957–58	Yorkshire League Division 1	16th/18	-	-	-
1958–59	Yorkshire League Division 2	4th/13	-	-	-
1959–60	Yorkshire League Division 1	18th/18	-	-	-
1960–61	Yorkshire League Division 2	12th/19	-	Preliminary round	-
1961–62	Yorkshire League Division 2	6th/14	-	-	-
1962–63	Yorkshire League Division 2	9th/15	-	-	-
1963–64	Yorkshire League Division 2	1st/15	-	-	-
1964–65	Yorkshire League Division 1	10th/16	-	-	-
1965–66	Yorkshire League Division 1	15th/16	-	-	-
1966–67	Yorkshire League Division 2	12th/17	-	-	-
1967–68	Yorkshire League Division 2	14th/17	-	-	-
1968–69	Yorkshire League Division 2	1st/17	1st qualifying round	-	-
1969–70	Yorkshire League Division 1	1st/18	3rd qualifying round	-	-
1970–71	Yorkshire League Division 1	3rd/14	1st qualifying round	-	-
1971–72	Yorkshire League Division 1	12th/16	1st qualifying round	-	-
1972–73	Yorkshire League Division 1	12th/16	Preliminary round	-	-
1973–74	Yorkshire League Division 1	15th/16	1st qualifying round	-	-
1974–75	Yorkshire League Division 2	14th/15	-	-	-
1975–76	Yorkshire League Division 3	1st/16	-	-	1st round
1976–77	Yorkshire League Division 2	14th/16	-	-	Preliminary round
1977–78	Yorkshire League Division 3	3rd/16	-	-	1st round
1978–79	Yorkshire League Division 2	13th/16	-	-	1st round
1979–80	Yorkshire League Division 3	3rd/14	-	-	-
1980–81	Yorkshire League Division 2	16th/16	-	-	-
1981–82	Yorkshire League Division 3	14th/15	-	-	-

* League play-off finalists

== Honours ==
=== League ===
- Yorkshire League Division One
  - Champions: 1969–70
- Yorkshire League Division Two
  - Promoted: 1953–54 (champions), 1955–56 (champions), 1958–59, 1963–64 (champions), 1968–69 (champions)
- Yorkshire League Division Three
  - Promoted: 1975–76 (champions), 1977–78, 1979–80
- Sheffield Association League
  - Champions: 1935–36, 1938–39, 1950–51
- Hatchard League
  - Runners-up: 1901–02

=== Cup ===
- Sheffield & Hallamshire Senior Cup
  - Winners: 1938–39, 1970–71
  - Runners-up: 1932–33

== Records ==
- Best League performance: 1st, Yorkshire League Division 1, 1969–70
- Best FA Cup performance: 1st round, 1951–52
- Best FA Amateur Cup performance: 3rd round, 1930–31, 1933–34
- Best FA Vase performance: 1st round, 1975–76, 1977–78, 1978–79
