= Retford Town F.C. =

- Full name: Retford Town Football Club
- Dissolved: 1985
- Ground: River Lane, Retford, Nottinghamshire
- 1984-85: Northern Counties East League, 4th (folded)

Retford Town F.C. was a football club based in Northern Counties East League, Nottinghamshire, England.

== History ==
Retford Town F.C. joined the Yorkshire League in 1949 and won the Second Division title in their first season, winning promotion to the top flight. Though league runners-up in 1952, they were relegated back to Division Two in 1956. A year later they won promotion back again, and in 1959 won the Yorkshire League title.

They were elected to the Midland League in 1961, and finished as runners-up of that competition in their first season, their highest ever league finish. They remained in the Midland League until 1980, when they dropped out of the competition. They played in several local leagues before joining the Northern Counties East League in 1984. They won the Division Two South title at the first attempt but folded at the end of the following season.

== See also ==
- Retford Town F.C. players
- Retford Town F.C. managers
