= Norton Woodseats F.C. =

Norton Woodseats
- Full name: Norton Woodseats Football Club
- Founded: 1912
- Dissolved: 1999
- Ground: Coach & Horses Ground (Dronfield, Derbyshire)

Norton Woodseats F.C. was an English association football club from Sheffield, South Yorkshire, but based for most of their existence in Dronfield, Derbyshire.

== History ==
Formed in 1912, in their early years the club competed in local Sheffield leagues before entering the Sheffield Amateur League and then the Sheffield Association League, winning the latter in 1928. They entered the FA Amateur Cup for the first time in 1926 and the FA Cup a year later. They won the Association League again in 1938, and a year later reached the semi-finals of the Amateur Cup, losing to Willington at Ayresome Park in Middlesbrough.

After the Second World War the club joined the Yorkshire League, gaining promotion to Division 1 in 1950. They finished as high as league runners-up in 1955, but were relegated back to Division 2 in 1964. Although they won promotion back to the Yorkshire League's top flight after two seasons, they struggled in the lower echelons of Division 1 for four years before being relegated again.

In 1974 they were relegated to Division 3, but won promotion back to Division 2 at the first time of asking, and when the Yorkshire League merged with the Midland League to form the Northern Counties East League in 1982, Norton Woodseats were accepted into the new competition. They remained members of the NCEL until 1991 (being known as Dronfield United from 1984 to 1991), when they resigned from the league. A year later they joined the Central Midlands League before resigning from this league too after just three years and disbanding. Although the club was reformed to enter the Sheffield & Hallamshire County Senior Football League in 1994, the club was on its last legs, and dissolved for good in 1999.

=== Notable former players ===
Players that played in the Football League either before or after being with Norton Woodseats:

- Wilfred Adey
- Cec Coldwell
- David Frain
- Harry Gooney
- Howard Johnson
- Ben Shearman

=== League and cup history ===
Norton Woodseats League and Cup history
Season	Division	Position	FA Cup	FA Amateur Cup	FA Vase
1924–25	Sheffield Amateur League Division 2	/15	-	-	-
1925–26	Sheffield Association League	/13	-	3rd Round	-
1926–27	Sheffield Association League	/14	Preliminary round	1st round	-
1927–28	Sheffield Association League	1st/14	-	1st round	-
1928–29	Sheffield Association League	/15	1st qualifying round	1st round	-
1929–30			Preliminary round	1st round	-
1930–31			Preliminary round	2nd round	-
1931–32			1st qualifying round	1st round	-
1932–33			Preliminary round	3rd qualifying round	-
1933–34			-	3rd qualifying round	-
1934–35			-	2nd qualifying round	-
1935–36			Preliminary round	1st round	-
1936–37			2nd qualifying round	2nd round	-
1937–38	Sheffield Association League	1st	Preliminary round	4th qualifying round	-
1938–39			2nd qualifying round	Semi-finals	-
1945–46	Sheffield Association League Division 2		1st qualifying round	2nd round	-
1946–47	Sheffield Association League	/18	Preliminary round	3rd Round	-
1947–48	Sheffield Association League	/20	Preliminary round	3rd Round	-
1948–49	Sheffield Association League	/18	4th qualifying round	2nd round	-
1949–50	Yorkshire League Division 2	5th/18	1st qualifying round	1st round	-
1950–51	Yorkshire League Division 2	4th/17	2nd qualifying round	1st round	-
1951–52	Yorkshire League Division 1	9th/18	2nd qualifying round	1st round	-
1952–53	Yorkshire League Division 1	11th/18	3rd qualifying round	4th qualifying round	-
1953–54	Yorkshire League Division 1	4th/18	2nd qualifying round	4th qualifying round	-
1954–55	Yorkshire League Division 1	2nd/18	2nd qualifying round	2nd round	-
1955–56	Yorkshire League Division 1	13th/16	1st qualifying round	3rd Round	-
1956–57	Yorkshire League Division 1	7th/18	3rd qualifying round	1st round	-
1957–58	Yorkshire League Division 1	6th/18	4th qualifying round	2nd round	-
1958–59	Yorkshire League Division 1	11th/18	3rd qualifying round	1st round	-
1959–60	Yorkshire League Division 1	6th/18	2nd qualifying round	3rd Round	-
1960–61	Yorkshire League Division 1	12th/18	-	2nd round	-
1961–62	Yorkshire League Division 1	7th/16	1st qualifying round	1st round	-
1962–63	Yorkshire League Division 1	7th/16	1st qualifying round	2nd round	-
1963–64	Yorkshire League Division 1	15th/16	2nd qualifying round	1st round	-
1964–65	Yorkshire League Division 2	12th/15	1st qualifying round	1st round	-
1965–66	Yorkshire League Division 2	1st/15	1st qualifying round	1st round	-
1966–67	Yorkshire League Division 1	12th/17	-	4th qualifying round	-
1967–68	Yorkshire League Division 1	14th/17	2nd qualifying round	1st round	-
1968–69	Yorkshire League Division 1	15th/18	1st qualifying round	4th qualifying round	-
1969–70	Yorkshire League Division 1	15th/18	1st qualifying round	3rd qualifying round	-
1970–71	Yorkshire League Division 2	8th/14	2nd qualifying round	1st qualifying round	-
1971–72	Yorkshire League Division 2	13th/15	1st qualifying round	1st qualifying round	-
1972–73	Yorkshire League Division 2	13th/16	Preliminary round	1st qualifying round	-
1973–74	Yorkshire League Division 2	16th/16	1st qualifying round	Preliminary Round	-
1974–75	Yorkshire League Division 3	4th/16	-	-	1st round
1975–76	Yorkshire League Division 2	10th/15	-	-	2nd round
1976–77	Yorkshire League Division 2	8th/16	-	-	Preliminary Round
1977–78	Yorkshire League Division 2	6th/15	-	-	3rd Round
1978–79	Yorkshire League Division 2	10th/16	-	-	3rd Round
1979–80	Yorkshire League Division 2	9th/16	-	-	1st round
1980–81	Yorkshire League Division 2	9th/16	-	-	4th round
1981–82	Yorkshire League Division 2	7th/16	-	-	1st round
1982–83	Northern Counties East League Division 1 South	9th/14	-	-	2nd round
1983–84	Northern Counties East League Division 1 South	13th/14	-	-	1st round
1984–85	Northern Counties East League Division 1 South	3rd/16	-	-	-
1985–86	Northern Counties East League Division 1	15th/16	-	-	-
1986–87	Northern Counties East League Division 1	18th/18	-	-	-
1987–88	Northern Counties East League Division 1	16th/16	-	-	-
1988–89	Northern Counties East League Division 2	6th/14	-	-	-
1989–90	Northern Counties East League Division 2	13th/14	-	-	-
1990–91	Northern Counties East League Division 2	11th/13	-	-	-
1991–92	Central Midlands League Premier Division North	3rd/14	-	-	-
1992–93	Central Midlands League Premier Division	4th/19	-	-	-
1993–94	Central Midlands League Premier Division	3rd/15	-	-	-
1996–97	Sheffield & Hallamshire County Senior League Division 2	6th/15	-	-	-
1997–98	Sheffield & Hallamshire County Senior League Division 2	4th/15	-	-	-
1998–99	Sheffield & Hallamshire County Senior League Division 2	1st/12	-	-	-

== Honours ==
=== League ===
- Yorkshire League Division One
  - Runners-up: 1954–55
- Yorkshire League Division Two
  - Promoted: 1950–51, 1965–66 (champions)
- Yorkshire League Division Three
  - Promoted: 1974–75
- Sheffield Association League
  - Champions: 1927–28, 1937–38
- Sheffield & Hallamshire County Senior League Division 2
  - Champions: 1998–99

=== Cup ===
- Sheffield & Hallamshire Senior Cup
  - Winners: 1937–38
  - Runners-up: 1943–44, 1966–67, 1967–68

== Records ==
- Best FA Cup performance: 4th qualifying round, 1948–49, 1957–58
- Best FA Amateur Cup performance: Semi-final, 1938–39
- Best FA Vase performance: 4th round, 1980–81
