= Wombwell Town F.C. (1945) =

Defunct association football club in England

Wombwell Town
- Full name: Wombwell Town Football Club
- Founded: 1945 (as Wombwell Athletic)
- Dissolved: 2000

Wombwell Town F.C. was an English football club located in Wombwell, Barnsley, South Yorkshire.

== History ==
Wombwell Athletic was formed after the end of the Second World War, entering into the Yorkshire League and winning the championship at the first attempt. They entered the FA Cup for the first time a year later, reaching the 3rd qualifying round. They were relegated from Division 1 in 1953 and three years later renamed themselves Wombwell & Darfield. They would spend ten years in the second tier before winning the Second Division title in 1963 as Wombwell Sporting Association, having changed name again in 1961.

They were relegated back to Division 2 in 1971 and by the time the Yorkshire League came to a close in 1982 Wombwell had been in floundering at the bottom of Division 3 for a number of years. When the league merged with the Midland League in the summer of 1982 to form the Northern Counties East League (NCEL), the club was placed in Division 2 South of the new competition. They left the NCEL in 1988 to join the Central Midlands League.

In 1990 they changed name again, to Wombwell Town, and in 1993 they left the Central Midlands League to join the Sheffield & Hallamshire County Senior League. They were promoted to the Premier Division in 1996 but the club was dissolved in 2000 after over 50 years of history.

In 2018 a new team named Wombwell Town F.C. were formed to play in the Sheffield & Hallamshire County Senior League and play at the Wombwell Recreation Ground in the town.

=== Notable former players ===
Players that played in the Football League either before or after being with Wombwell Town –

- Sid Storey

=== League and cup history ===
Wombwell Town League and Cup history
| Season | Division | Position | FA Cup | FA Trophy |
|---|---|---|---|---|
| 1945–46 | Yorkshire League | 1st/15 | - | - |
| 1946–47 | Yorkshire League | 8th/20 | 3rd qualifying round | - |
| 1947–48 | Yorkshire League | 10th/20 | Preliminary round | - |
| 1948–49 | Yorkshire League | 10th/20 | 1st qualifying round | - |
| 1949–50 | Yorkshire League | 2nd/18 | Extra preliminary round | - |
| 1950–51 | Yorkshire League Division 1 | 11th/18 | - | - |
| 1951–52 | Yorkshire League Division 1 | 14th/18 | - | - |
| 1952–53 | Yorkshire League Division 1 | 16th/18 | - | - |
| 1953–54 | Yorkshire League Division 2 | 6th/18 | - | - |
| 1954–55 | Yorkshire League Division 2 | 8th/18 | - | - |
| 1955–56 | Yorkshire League Division 2 | 14th/18 | - | - |
| 1956–57 | Yorkshire League Division 2 | 17th/17 | - | - |
| 1957–58 | Yorkshire League Division 2 | 14th/14 | - | - |
| 1958–59 | Yorkshire League Division 2 | 12th/14 | - | - |
| 1959–60 | Yorkshire League Division 2 | 13th/15 | - | - |
| 1960–61 | Yorkshire League Division 2 | 18th/19 | - | - |
| 1961–62 | Yorkshire League Division 2 | 5th/14 | - | - |
| 1962–63 | Yorkshire League Division 2 | 1st/15 | - | - |
| 1963–64 | Yorkshire League Division 1 | 8th/16 | - | - |
| 1964–65 | Yorkshire League Division 1 | 1st/16 | - | - |
| 1965–66 | Yorkshire League Division 1 | 1st/16 | - | - |
| 1966–67 | Yorkshire League Division 1 | 3rd/17 | - | - |
| 1967–68 | Yorkshire League Division 1 | 8th/17 | - | - |
| 1968–69 | Yorkshire League Division 1 | 7th/18 | Preliminary round | - |
| 1969–70 | Yorkshire League Division 1 | 7th/18 | 2nd qualifying round | 2nd qualifying round |
| 1970–71 | Yorkshire League Division 1 | 17th/17 | - | - |
| 1971–72 | Yorkshire League Division 2 | 10th/15 | - | - |
| 1972–73 | Yorkshire League Division 2 | 11th/16 | - | - |
| 1973–74 | Yorkshire League Division 2 | 15th/16 | - | - |
| 1974–75 | Yorkshire League Division 3 | 8th/16 | - | - |
| 1975–76 | Yorkshire League Division 3 | 8th/16 | - | - |
| 1976–77 | Yorkshire League Division 3 | 9th/16 | - | - |
| 1977–78 | Yorkshire League Division 3 | 2nd/16 | - | - |
| 1978–79 | Yorkshire League Division 2 | 16th/16 | - | - |
| 1979–80 | Yorkshire League Division 3 | 14th/14 | - | - |
| 1980–81 | Yorkshire League Division 3 | 12th/14 | - | - |
| 1981–82 | Yorkshire League Division 3 | 8th/15 | - | - |
| 1982–83 | Northern Counties East League Division 2 South | 13th/14 | - | - |
| 1983–84 | Northern Counties East League Division 2 South | 8th/13 | - | - |
| 1984–85 | Northern Counties East League Division 1 Central | 15th/16 | - | - |
| 1985–86 | Northern Counties East League Division 3 | 13th/14 | - | - |
| 1986–87 | Northern Counties East League Division 2 | 17th/18 | - | - |
| 1987–88 | Northern Counties East League Division 2 | 14th/15 | - | - |
| 1988–89 | Central Midlands League Premier Division | 18th/19 | - | - |
| 1989–90 | Central Midlands League Premier Division | 19th/20 | - | - |
| 1990–91 | Central Midlands League Supreme Division | 16th/17 | - | - |
| 1991–92 | Central Midlands League Supreme Division | 15th/18 | - | - |
| 1992–93 | Central Midlands League Supreme Division | 16th/16 | - | - |
| 1993–94 | Sheffield & Hallamshire County Senior League Division 1 | 10th/13 | - | - |
| 1994–95 | Sheffield & Hallamshire County Senior League Division 1 | 7th/14 | - | - |
| 1995–96 | Sheffield & Hallamshire County Senior League Division 1 | 3rd/13 | - | - |
| 1996–97 | Sheffield & Hallamshire County Senior League Premier Division | 10th/14 | - | - |
| 1997–98 | Sheffield & Hallamshire County Senior League Premier Division | 11th/14 | - | - |
| 1998–99 | Sheffield & Hallamshire County Senior League Premier Division | 8th/14 | - | - |
| 1999–00 | Sheffield & Hallamshire County Senior League Premier Division | 3rd/14 | - | - |

== Honours ==
=== League ===
- Yorkshire League
  - Champions: 1945–46, 1964–65, 1965–66
- Yorkshire League Division 2
  - Promoted: 1962–63 (champions)
- Yorkshire League Division 3
  - Promoted: 1977–78
- Sheffield & Hallamshire County Senior League Division 1
  - Promoted: 1995–96

=== Cup ===
- Sheffield & Hallamshire Senior Cup
  - Winners: 1945–46

== Records ==
- Best FA Cup performance: 3rd qualifying round, 1946–47
- Best FA Trophy performance: 2nd qualifying round, 1969–70
