= Stocksbridge Works F.C. =

Stocksbridge Works
- Full name: Stocksbridge Works Football Club
- Dissolved: 1986
- Ground: Bracken Moor
Home colours

Stocksbridge Works F.C. was an English football club located in Stocksbridge, Sheffield, South Yorkshire.

== History ==
The club played in the Sheffield Association League before joining the Yorkshire League in 1949, entering the FA Cup for the first time in the same year. They won the Division 2 title in 1951, earning promotion to Division 1. The following season they won the Sheffield & Hallamshire Senior Cup and completed a double by winning the Yorkshire League title in their inaugural top flight campaign. They remained in the upper reaches of the league until the mid-1960s, winning the championship on a further six occasions establishing themselves as one of the most successful clubs in the league's history.

A year after their seventh title win in 1963 Stocksbridge slumped to relegation back to Division 2, and the following years would see them become a yo-yo club, being either promoted or relegated in 12 out of 16 seasons between 1963 and 1979. By the time the Yorkshire League merged with the Midland Football League to form the Northern Counties East League (NCEL) in 1982, Stocksbridge had sunk to Division 3, and were to emerge in Division 2 South of the new competition.

The club lasted just four seasons in the NCEL, until in the summer of 1986 they merged with another local side, Oxley Park Sports, to form Stocksbridge Park Steels, a club which was then a member of the Northern Premier League.

=== League and cup history ===
Stocksbridge Works League and Cup history
Season	Division	Position	FA Cup	FA Amateur Cup
1947–48	Sheffield Association League		-	-
1948–49	Sheffield Association League		-	-
1949–50	Yorkshire League Division 2	7th/18	2nd qualifying round	-
1950–51	Yorkshire League Division 2	1st/17	4th qualifying round	-
1951–52	Yorkshire League Division 1	1st/18	1st qualifying round	-
1952–53	Yorkshire League Division 1	3rd/18	1st qualifying round	-
1953–54	Yorkshire League Division 1	5th/18	1st qualifying round	-
1954–55	Yorkshire League Division 1	1st/18	-	-
1955–56	Yorkshire League Division 1	1st/18	2nd qualifying round	-
1956–57	Yorkshire League Division 1	1st/18	4th qualifying round	-
1957–58	Yorkshire League Division 1	1st/18	3rd qualifying round	-
1958–59	Yorkshire League Division 1	5th/18	3rd qualifying round	-
1959–60	Yorkshire League Division 1	12th/18	1st qualifying round	-
1960–61	Yorkshire League Division 1	2nd/18	-	-
1961–62	Yorkshire League Division 1	1st/16	3rd qualifying round	-
1962–63	Yorkshire League Division 1	1st/16	1st qualifying round	-
1963–64	Yorkshire League Division 1	14th/16	1st qualifying round	-
1964–65	Yorkshire League Division 2	1st/15	1st qualifying round	-
1965–66	Yorkshire League Division 1	16th/16	1st qualifying round	-
1966–67	Yorkshire League Division 2	4th/17	-	-
1967–68	Yorkshire League Division 1	17th/17		-
1968–69	Yorkshire League Division 2	13th/17	-	2nd qualifying round
1969–70	Yorkshire League Division 2	9th/18	-	
1970–71	Yorkshire League Division 3	1st/15	-	Preliminary Round
1971–72	Yorkshire League Division 2	9th/15	-	1st qualifying round
1972–73	Yorkshire League Division 2	15th/16	1st qualifying round	-
1973–74	Yorkshire League Division 3	8th/16	Preliminary round	-
1974–75	Yorkshire League Division 3	1st/16	1st qualifying round	-
1975–76	Yorkshire League Division 2	15th/15	1st qualifying round	-
1976–77	Yorkshire League Division 3	13th/16	-	-
1977–78	Yorkshire League Division 3	11th/16	-	-
1978–79	Yorkshire League Division 3	2nd/15	-	-
1979–80	Yorkshire League Division 2	16th/16	-	-
1980–81	Yorkshire League Division 3	5th/16	-	-
1981–82	Yorkshire League Division 3	6th/15	-	-
1982–83	Northern Counties East League Division 2 South	5th/14	-	-
1983–84	Northern Counties East League Division 2 South	11th/14	-	-
1984–85	Northern Counties East League Division 1 Central	14th/16	-	-
1985–86	Northern Counties East League Division 3	10th/14	-	-

== Honours ==
=== League ===
- Yorkshire League Division 1
  - Champions: 1951–52, 1954–55, 1955–56, 1956–57, 1957–58, 1961–62, 1962–63
- Yorkshire League Division 2
  - Promoted: 1950–51 (champions), 1964–65 (champions), 1966–67
- Yorkshire League Division 3
  - Promoted: 1970–71 (champions), 1974–75 (champions), 1978–79

=== Cup ===
- Sheffield & Hallamshire Senior Cup
  - Winners: 1951–52
  - Runners-up: 1950–51, 1954–55, 1955–56, 1957–58, 1963–64

== Colours ==
The club wore all sky blue.

== Ground ==
The club's ground was at Bracken Moor, the same as that used by an earlier club in town, Stocksbridge Foresters, in the 1880s.

== Records ==
- Best League performance: 1st, Yorkshire League Division 1, 1951–52, 1954–55, 1955–56, 1956–57, 1957–58, 1961–62, 1962–63
- Best FA Cup performance: 4th qualifying round, 1950–51, 1956–57
- Best FA Amateur Cup performance: 2nd qualifying round 1968–69
