= Hull Brunswick F.C. =

Football club in Kingston upon Hull, East Riding of Yorkshire, England

Hull Brunswick
- Full name: Hull Brunswick Football Club
- Founded: 1894
- Dissolved: 1973

Hull Brunswick F.C. was an English football club based in Hull.

== History ==
The club competed in the Yorkshire Football League and FA Cup during the 1960s and 1970s.
