= Goole Town F.C. =

Goole Town
- Full name: Goole Town Football Club
- Nickname: the Vikings
- Founded: 1900
- Dissolved: 1996
- Ground: Victoria Pleasure Grounds
- 1995–96: Northern Counties East Football League Premier Division, 15th
Home colours

Goole Town Football Club was a semi-professional football club based in the town of Goole, East Riding of Yorkshire, England. Established in 1912, they folded in 1996. The club spent its entire existence in non-league football, where they won various championships over the years. Perhaps Goole's crowning achievement was reaching the FA Cup third round in 1956–57 before going out to Nottingham Forest.

== History ==
The club was founded in 1900 as Goole Town Football Club; in 1912, it became a limited company and entered the Midland Football League. Town played in that league for three seasons, finishing each season respectably and with a highest position of 4th place in 1914–15. That same season they reached the first round of the FA Cup, but lost to Middlesbrough 9–3 at Ayresome Park.

Play was suspended because of the First World War and Goole did not re-enter the Midland League afterwards. However, just after the war, as Goole Shipyards Football Club they became founding members of the Yorkshire Football League for the 1920–21 season.

In 1924 the club had reverted to the Goole Town name and were back in the Yorkshire League. By the late 1920s Goole had proved themselves at this level, their pinnacle in this period being their championship-winning season in 1927–28. Goole continued in the Yorkshire League throughout the 1930s and 1940s, picking up the championship during both the 1936–37 and 1947–48 seasons.

=== Return to the Midland League ===
In 1948, Goole Town decided to return to the Midland Football League, which they had not competed in since the start of the First World War. At the end of 1950–51, they finished in 3rd place above the likes of Peterborough United and Boston United.

For the rest of the 1950s however, Goole lingered in the lower regions of the league, but had one very notable FA Cup run. In the 1956–57 season Goole Town reached the third round of the FA Cup, having previously knocked out Wigan Athletic 2–1 away and Football League Third Division North side Workington, before finally going out to Nottingham Forest.

The 1960s for Goole Town was largely uneventful in the league; the majority of the time they finished around mid-table, with a decent 5th-place finish in 1967–68 being the highlight. That season they had also taken Spennymoor United to a first round replay in the FA Cup.

=== Northern Premier League ===
Goole Town became one of the founding members of the Northern Premier League in 1968, where they played against the likes of Macclesfield Town, Scarborough and Stafford Rangers – alongside old rivals Boston United and Wigan Athletic. During the first-ever season of the league, they finished in 8th place.

Their best finish in the Northern Premier League was 6th place on two occasions these were the 1976–77 season and then again in the 1988–89 season, while their worst finishes were in 1970–71, 1985–86 and 1992–93 seasons when they finished in last place on each occasion.

They reached the quarterfinal of the FA Trophy in the 1974–75 season, losing at home to Matlock Town 1–0 before a crowd of 3,500.

The club folded at the end of the 1995–96 season due to financial difficulties. A new club, Goole A.F.C., was formed in its place.

== Colours ==
The earliest known colour for the club is white jerseys. In 1956, the club changed to green shirts and white shorts, which it changed in 1967 to all white with green collars, cuffs, and stripe on shorts.

By 1977 the club's colours were navy blue and white and by the 1980s were yellow shirts, black shorts, and yellow socks.

The club's final colours were blue and red striped shirts, blue shorts, and red socks.

== Ground ==
The club played at the Victoria Pleasure Grounds.

== Records ==
- Goole Town's top attendance in any game was against Scunthorpe United in the 1949–50 season, when 8,700 packed into the Victoria Pleasure Ground for this important league match.

== Honours ==
- Northern Premier League
  - Challenge Cup winners: 1988–89
- Yorkshire League
  - Champions 1927–28, 1936–37, 1947–48
- West Riding County Cup
  - Winners 1950–51, 1951–52, 1956–57, 1968–69, 1969–70, 1975–76, 1976–77, 1977–78, 1984–85, 1986–87, 1988–89, 1991–92

== See also ==
- Goole Town F.C. players
- Goole Town F.C. managers
