= Bridlington Trinity F.C. =

Bridlington Trinity
- Full name: Bridlington Trinity Football Club

Bridlington Trinity Football Club was an English association football club based in Bridlington, in the East Riding of Yorkshire.

== History ==
- 1960–72 – Yorkshire League
- 1972–82 – Midland Football League
- 1982–90 – Northern Counties East League

== Honours ==
- Yorkshire League
  - Champions: 1963–64, 1966–67, 1967–68
  - Runners-up: 1969–70
- Yorkshire League Division Two
  - Champions: 1961–62
- Midland League
  - Runners-up: 1979–80

== Records ==
- Furthest FA Cup run – 3rd qualifying round, 1965–66, 1970–71, 1985–86
- Furthest FA Trophy run – 1st round, 1969–70, 1973–74
- Furthest FA Vase run – 1st round, 1989–90
