= Selby Town F.C. =

Association football club in England

Coordinates: 53°47′05.15″N 1°04′38.20″W

Selby Town
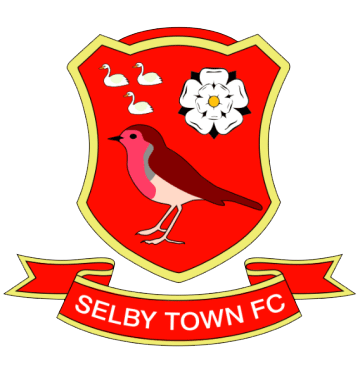
- Full name: Selby Town Football Club
- Nickname: The Robins
- Founded: 1919
- Stadium: Fairfax Plant Hire Stadium
- Capacity: 5,000 (220 seated)(550 covered standing)
- Chairman: David Haddock
- Manager: Stephen Bodle
- League: Northern Counties East League Division One
- 2025–26: Northern Counties East League Division One, 12th of 22
Home colours	Away colours

Selby Town Football Club is an English football club based in Selby, North Yorkshire, founded in 1919. They play in the Northern Counties East League Division One. The club's traditional rivals are Goole (with whom they play an annual match, for the right to win the Eric Lawton Cup) and Tadcaster Albion.

== History ==
Soon after the club's formation, in 1920 they were entered into the Yorkshire Football League as a founding member. During the 1930s Selby were one of the most successful clubs in the league, winning it three times before the Second World War.

After the war the club won two more Yorkshire League championships in 1952–53 and 1953–54 where they also reached the FA Cup 1st Round. During the 1954–55 season, they reached the Second Round of the FA Cup, the furthest in their history; they were knocked out by Hastings United 2–0.

The club's record goalscorer is Graham Shepherd who notched up 158 goals between 1963 and 1982. They stayed in the Yorkshire League through its entirety. In 1982 the League became part of the new Northern Counties East Football League (NCEL), which the Robins were drafted into. Selby became champions of the Northern Counties East League Division One in 1995–96 and until 2012 remained in the league they were promoted to; Northern Counties East League Premier Division. However the 2011–12 season saw them relegated to the NCEL Division 1.

Selby Town's modern era has seen them reach the 4th round of the FA Vase in 1995–96, the same year they won the NCEL Division One Title under the management of Barry Walker and Tony Carter. In recent seasons the club flourished under the guidance of former Player Bob Lyon, winning the Presidents Cup, Barkston Ash Cup and The Vets over 40s all in 2001.

=== 2012 relegation ===
The 2011–12 season proved turbulent for Selby Town, with poor results resulting in a series of managerial changes. Leon Sewell was appointed as manager in July 2011. He was replaced in September 2011, after only nine games, by Dave Heard. Heard's tenure also proved to be short, with new manager Graham Hodder taking over in January 2012. At this point the club lay in bottom place in the league. Outgoing manager Heard claimed that the club was in such financial trouble that it was unable to pay players' travelling expenses

In March 2012 a fourth consecutive 4–0 defeat confirmed Selby Town's relegation from the Northern Counties East League Premier Division for the first time since 1996.

In 2017, Christian Fox took over as manager and led Selby Town to the final of the West Riding County Cup in 2018, in a losing effort against Farsley Celtic. Selby seemed to be on course for promotion in the 2019–20 season, before the season was abandoned due to the COVID-19 pandemic in the United Kingdom with all results null and voided.

== Stadium ==
The Robins moved from the Bowling Green across town to the current Flaxley Road ground on Richard Street which was purpose built in the early 1950s.

The club's highest attendance of 3,000 was in 1954 when they played Bradford Park Avenue in the FA Cup 1st Round.

As a result of a sponsorship deal with the local newspaper, the Selby Times, the Flaxley Road ground was renamed the 'Selby Times Stadium'. In August 2010 a new three season sponsorship deal with Rigid Group (a local packaging manufacturer) led to the stadium being renamed the Rigid Group Stadium. From 2012 the stadium has been known as the Fairfax Plant Hire Stadium, after sponsorship from the Selby-based plant hire company.

== Current squad ==
As of 1 April 2025

Note: Flags indicate national team as defined under FIFA eligibility rules; some limited exceptions apply. Players may hold more than one non-FIFA nationality.

No.	Pos.	Nation	Player
—	GK	ENG	Jack Drury
—	GK	ENG	Liam Wilson
—	GK	ENG	Joseph Wilton
—	DF	ENG	Musab Aliyu
—	DF	ENG	Ryan Gothard
—	DF	ENG	Alex Marsh
—	DF	ENG	Cadeen-Riley McGrath
—	DF	ENG	Charlie Petch
—	DF	ENG	Declan Racher
—	DF	ENG	Connor Ryan
—	MF	ENG	Harley Adams
—	MF	ENG	Jack Bull
—	MF	ENG	Connor Charlton
—	MF	ENG	Riley Cooper

No.	Pos.	Nation	Player
—	MF	ENG	James Danby
—	MF	ENG	Daniel Davison
—	MF	ENG	Troy Greening
—	MF	ENG	Takunda Katsere
—	MF	ENG	Brennan McNulty
—	FW	ENG	Samuel Calvert
—	FW	ENG	Harry Clapham
—	FW	ENG	Matthew Dawes
—	FW	ENG	Edward Dry
—	FW	ENG	Liam Love
—	FW	ENG	Declan Parker
—	FW	ENG	Harrison Rowley
—	FW	SKN	Jason St Juste
—	FW	ENG	Finley Wade

== Records ==
- Best FA Cup performance: Second round, 1954–55
- Best FA Trophy performance: First qualifying Round, 1969–70, 1970–71, 1971–72
- Best FA Vase performance: Fourth round, 1995–96 (after two replays)

== Honours ==
- Northern Counties East Football League Division One
  - Champions: 1995–96
- Northern Counties East Football League Division Two
  - Runners-up: 1989–90
- Northern Counties East Football League League Cup
  - Runners-up: 1989–90
- Northern Counties East Football League Presidents Cup
  - Winners: 2000–01
- Yorkshire League
  - Champions: 1932–33, 1934–35, 1935–36, 1952–53, 1953–54
- Yorkshire League Cup
  - Winners: 1937–38, 1953–54, 1954–55, 1962–63
- West Riding Senior Cup
  - Winners: 1937–38
- West Riding County Cup
  - Winners: 1927–28, 1948–49
  - Runners-up: 2017–18
- West Riding Challenge Cup
  - Winners: 1934–35, 1935–36
- Eric Lawton Cup (Formerly known as the Otisdale Cup)
  - Winners: 2008–09, 2015–16, 2018–19, 2019–20

== Gallery ==
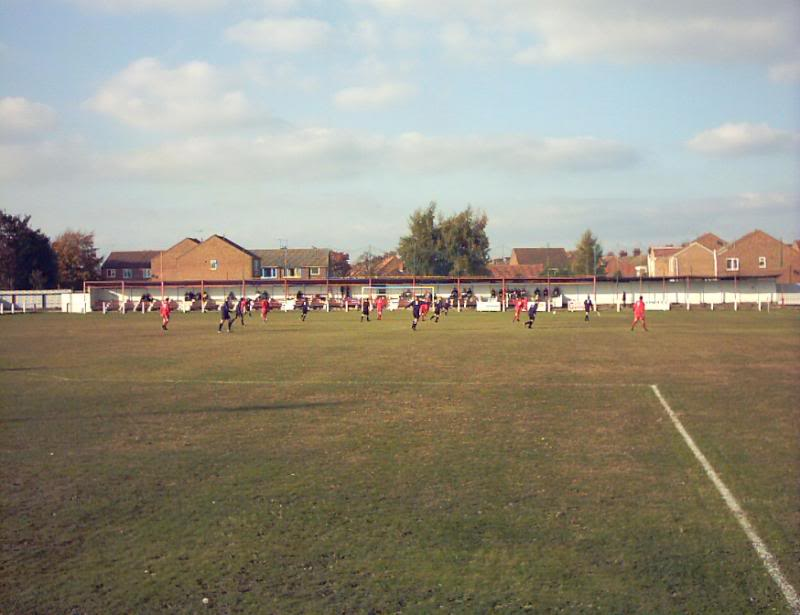
Flaxley Road seated stand and covered terrace.

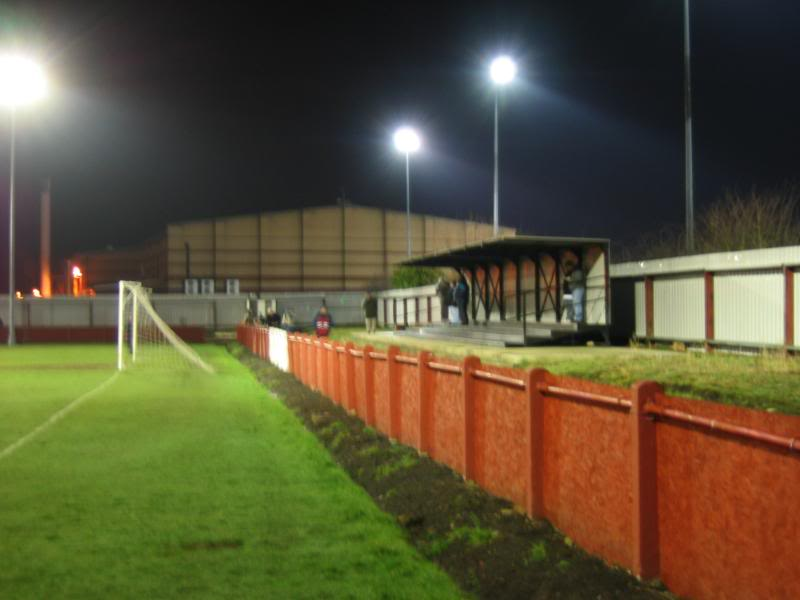
Sports centre terrace, re-locatable to the new ground.

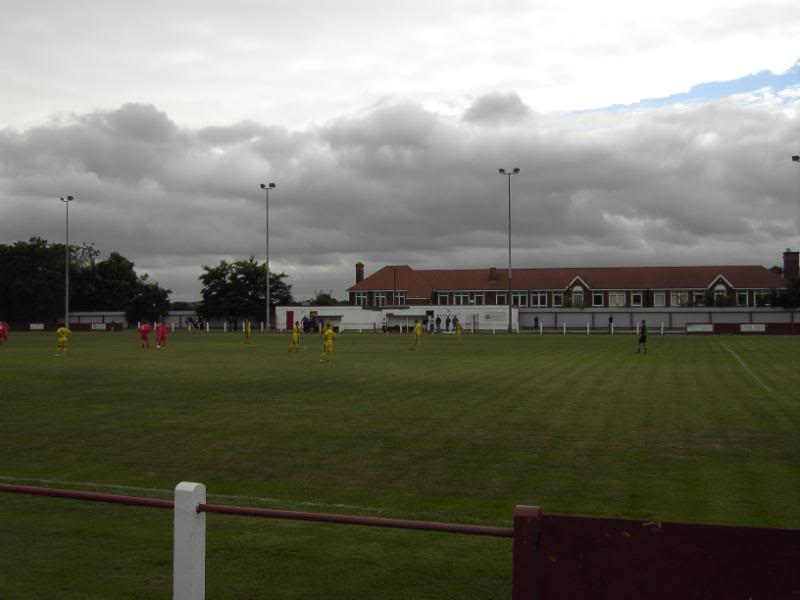
Changing rooms with dugouts school pitchside terrace.

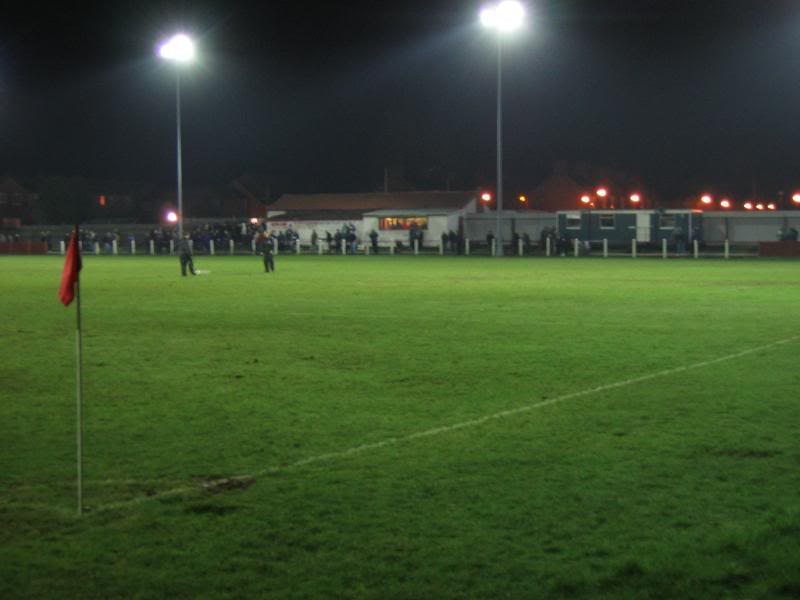
Richard Street side with turnstiles clubhouse and bar.
