= Pickering (surname) =

Pickering is an English toponymic surname derived from the town Pickering, North Yorkshire.

== People ==
- Adrienne Pickering (born 1981), Australian actress
- Alice Pickering (1860–1939), English tennis player
- Andrew Pickering, sociologist and science historian
- Bill Pickering (footballer, born 1901), English former footballer
- Calvin Pickering (born 1976), American baseball player
- Charles Pickering (disambiguation)
- Charlie Pickering (born 1977), Australian comedian
- Chip Pickering (born 1963), US Representative from Mississippi and son of Charles W. Pickering
- Christopher Pickering (MP) (c. 1556–1621), MP for Cumberland
- Chris Pickering, Australian alt.country musician
- Christopher Pickering (1842–1920), British businessman and philanthropist
- Craig Pickering (born 1986), British sprinter
- David Pickering (rugby union) (born 1960), former Wales international rugby union player
- David Pickering (writer) (born 1958), reference books compiler
- Donald Pickering (1933–2009), English actor
- E. T. Pickering (1888–1961), American college baseball coach
- Edward Charles Pickering (1846–1919), astronomer
- Ernest Pickering (1928–2000), American fundamentalist leader
- Ernest Harold Pickering (1881–1957), British politician, Unitarian minister and professor
- Fred Pickering (1941–2019), English footballer
- Frederick Brian Pickering (1927–2017), British metallurgist
- George Pickering (disambiguation)
- Harry Pickering (born 1998), English footballer
- Jack Pickering (1908–1977), English footballer
- James Pickering (died c. 1398), English politician
- James Pickering (rugby league) (born 1966), Fijian rugby league player
- John Pickering (disambiguation)
- Karen Pickering (born 1971), champion British swimmer
- Kedrick Pickering, British Virgin Islands politician
- Larry Pickering (1942–2018), Australian political cartoonist
- Liam Pickering (born 1968), Australian Rules footballer
- Lionel Pickering (1932–2006), English owner of Derby County football club
- Martin Pickering (born 1966), British psychologist
- Mick Pickering (born 1956), English former footballer
- Mike Pickering (born 1954), DJ
- Nathan Pickering (born 2000), American football player
- Nick Pickering (born 1963), English footballer
- Norman C. Pickering (1916–2015), American engineer and musical instrument designer
- Philip D. Pickering (born 1948), Baron of Newton
- Rex Pickering (1936–2017), New Zealand rugby union player
- Robert Young Pickering (1849–1931), British industrialist
- Robert Hugh Pickering (1932–2015), Canadian farmer, curler and political figure in Saskatchewan
- Ron Pickering (1930–2014), English athletics coach and commentator
- Percival Spencer Umfreville Pickering (1858–1920), British chemist and horticulturist
- Samuel Pickering (born 1941), English professor on whom was based the character John Keating in the film Dead Poets Society
- Shaun Pickering (1961–2023), Welsh shot putter
- Stacey Pickering (born 1968), Mississippi State Senator and State Auditor of Mississippi
- Thomas Pickering (martyr) (1621–1679), English Benedictine lay brother and martyr
- Thomas G. Pickering (1940–2009), British physician and professor of medicine
- Thomas R. Pickering (born 1931), American politician
- Timothy Pickering (1745–1829), third Secretary of State of the United States, Postmaster General and politician
- Tom Pickering (footballer) (1906-?), English footballer
- Warren Pickering, Australian politician
- William Pickering (disambiguation), several people

== Fictional characters ==
- Colonel Hugh Pickering, in the play Pygmalion by George Bernard Shaw and its various adaptations
- Charles Pickering, the villain of the novella The Gingerbread Girl by Stephen King
- Nina Pickering, a lead character in the British television series Being Human

== See also ==
- Justice Pickering (disambiguation)
- Senator Pickering (disambiguation)
