= Hallam F.C. =

Association football club in England

Hallam
- Full name: Hallam Football Club
- Nickname: The Countrymen
- Founded: 1860; 166 years ago (founded); 1887; 139 years ago (reformed)
- Ground: Sandygate
- Capacity: 1,665 (250 seated)
- Coordinates: 53°22′35″N 1°31′52″W
- Chairman: Richard Pillinger
- Manager: Danny Patterson and Richard Patterson
- League: Northern Premier League Division One East
- 2025–26: Northern Premier League Division One East, 12th of 22
- Website: https://www.hallamfc.co.uk/
| Home colours | Away colours | Third colours |

Hallam Football Club is an English football club based in Crosspool, Sheffield, South Yorkshire. Hallam have played at their Sandygate home in the Sheffield suburb of Crosspool since 1860, with the ground being officially recognised by the Guinness Book of Records as "The Oldest Football Ground in the World". In 1867, the club made history by winning the world's first ever football tournament, the Youdan Cup. Hallam F.C. is also credited with having some of the earliest evidence of passing in football.

Hallam currently play in the Northern Premier League Division One East, at the eighth level of the English football league system.

== History ==
=== Early history ===
The football club can trace its links to 1804, when the owner of the Plough Inn public house on Sandygate Road agreed to allow a new cricket club, Hallam CC, to start playing on an adjacent field he owned.

The club had in excess of 300 members by the 1850s, and in 1860 it decided to form a football club to oppose Sheffield F.C., formed three years earlier. This Hallam Football Club team was made up of players from the Hallamshire militia. On Boxing Day 1860, the two clubs played each other at Sandygate for the first time. This was the first inter-club match ever played in history. The match report for the game in the Sheffield Daily Telegraph states that the game was played between 16 of Sheffield and 16 of Hallam and Stumperlowe (Stumperlowe being a hamlet half a mile from Sandygate).

The Hallam Football Club's founder and captain, John Charles Shaw, soon became President of the Sheffield Football Association which organised matches according to the locally preferred rules for its growing number of member clubs. Shaw was directly instrumental, with Charles Alcock of the London-based Football Association, in the formation of nationally accepted rules for playing the game. Shaw and Alcock were the respective captains in the first game between a Sheffield XI and a London XI, in 1871, in which the preferred rules were tried out.

Although professionalism began to creep into the game during the 1870s and 1880s, Hallam chose to remain fully amateur. In the summer of 1886, for reasons unknown but likely because of financial constraints, the club was dissolved, but a year later the club was re-formed and re-registered with the Sheffield & Hallamshire FA.

=== The Youdan Cup ===
In 1867, Hallam won the first ever football competition, the Youdan Cup. The trophy was subsequently misplaced by the club, and did not resurface again until 1997 when a Scottish antiques collector who had come into possession of the silver trophy sold it back to the club for £2,000. In 2014 the trophy was featured on the BBC programme Antiques Roadshow, where it was valued at £100,000. Club chairman Chris Taylor subsequently said the club had no plans to sell the trophy.

"THE YOUDAN FOOTBALL CUP. -The Hallam and Norfolk Football Clubs played the final match for this prize at Brammall-lane Cricket Ground, Sheffield, on Shrove Tuesday. The toss for choice of goals was won by Norfolk, who kicked with the wind, but were unable to score. After playing half time ends were changed, when it was soon evident the Hallamites had the game in their own hands. After half an hour's play the ball was kicked by Elliott, not through the goal, but just over it, and was touched down be Ash in splendid style, after running round two of his opponents before getting to the ball, thus securing a rouge. The Norfolk captain immediately kicked off, thus hoping to secure a goal for his side whilst his opponents were off their guard, but in their haste and confusion they left their goal unprotected, which was taken advantage of by one of the Hallam players securing another rouge, when time was called. Thus, Hallam won scoring two rouges to their opponent's nothing." Bell's Life in London and Sporting Chronicle, Saturday, 9 March 1867

Being the first recognized football competition and given Hallam's controversial method of victory, the Youdan Cup was influential in shaping the rules of early football matches. The regulations for the cup were determined by the Youdan Prize committee, which Hallam's captain John Charles Shaw was a member of. As for the rules of the competition, there is still debate of which ruleset was used, London or Sheffield. It is clear however that elements of both rulesets and experimentation of rules was a part of the cup. After the first round of play, the committee would expand referee powers for throw in infringements due to the Sheffield six-yard rule not being in play. Importantly rouges (a Sheffield rule) were allowed, which were "obtained by grounding the ball between rouge flags four yards apart either side of the goalposts." This rule would ultimately decide the outcome of the cup and victory for Hallam. John Charles Shaw would continue to be an important administerial figure in the early game; in 1868 he was elected vice president of the Sheffield FA, becoming president in 1869 and holding the position for the next 14 years.

More reporting regarding Hallam's play at the Cup:

- 'The Mackenzie and Hallam football clubs competed for this prize at Bramall lane on Saturday, and some good play was the result, although it was evident from the commencement that Hallam had the advantage, their side being a much more bulky specimen of humanity than their opponents.'
- 'Hallam certainly showed the best play but there was far too much playing the men instead of the ball, as there generally is in these matches thus giving the advantage to heavy rough over the lighter players.'

Sheffield and Rotherham Independent, 4 March, (1867) "The Youdan Football Cup"

=== First Look at League Play ===
Hallam entered their first league competition in 1892 when joining the newly formed Hallamshire League, and they would also play in the Sheffield Minor Cup League, Sheffield Alliance and the Hatchard League as the 19th century came to a close. They won the Hatchard League title for the first time in 1903, and a year later won the league again, though they lost the play-off final played between the top four teams, and so surrendered their title. They also reached the final of the Sheffield and Hallamshire Senior Cup for the first time in 1904, but lost 1–6 to Barnsley reserves at Bramall Lane.

In 1911 the club first competed in a Football Association (FA) cup competition, when they entered the FA Amateur Cup. Three years later the First World War began, but Hallam continued to play, dropping out of the Hatchard League to join the Sheffield Amateur and Minor Leagues, previously staples of the club's reserve team. Eventually, in 1917, Hallam decided they could no longer keep playing, and suspended playing operations, only re-joining the Sheffield Amateur League after hostilities had ended, in 1919.

In 1925 Hallam pulled off one of their greatest ever results when they knocked out five-time Amateur Cup winners Bishop Auckland in front of over 2,000 people at Sandygate. Two years later the club entered the FA Cup for the first time. After winning the Sheffield Amateur League for the second time in 1927, they were admitted back into the Sheffield Association League.

At the end of the 1932–33 season the landlord of the Plough Inn public house decided to lease Sandygate to other teams (Crookes WMC and later Fulwood) as Hallam were not providing enough bar takings. Although the club retained its affiliation with the local FA, Hallam's eviction from their ground saw them refrain from playing any football for a period of 15 years.

Hallam's return to football came about in 1947 when they finally arranged a return to Sandygate, playing in the Sheffield Amateur League and the re-formed Hatchard League (which they won) before finally re-joining the Sheffield Association League in 1949, winning the title for the first time. A year later Hallam won the Sheffield Senior Cup for the first time when they beat Stocksbridge Works at Hillsborough in front of 7,240 spectators, and in 1952 they entered the Yorkshire League.

That same season an Amateur Cup tie with Dulwich Hamlet was switched to Hillsborough stadium because of increased ticket demands – the attendance of over 13,000 proving to be a club record. After winning promotion to the top flight of the Yorkshire League for a second time in 1960, Hallam spent twenty years playing at the same level.

The 1982–83 season saw the demise of the old Yorkshire League, with Hallam entering the new Northern Counties East League (NCEL), which demanded more stringent ground grading rules. With only seven years of its ground lease remaining the club could not commit to expensive improvements. Protracted negotiations with the landlord eventually led to a 99 years extension being granted but a large premium was demanded within one year. A massive fund raising effort secured the new lease and continued for the provision of floodlights, first used in 1992, and a stand behind one goal to shelter 100 people.

The club has spent most of its time in the NCEL in the Premier Division (which currently sits at level 9 of the English football league system), and won the League Cup competition in 2004 when beating Mickleover Sports in the final, but in 2011 they were relegated back to the First Division.

In 2012, Sandygate received a much needed facelift, paid for by a posthumous donation by a lifelong supporter who had left the club a substantial amount of money in his will. In 2016 and 2017, the club qualified for the Division One end of season play-offs, but were eliminated in the semi-finals on both occasions.

The appointment of Craig Denton as manager in 2020 was followed by an upturn in results and attendances, and in the 2021–22 season Hallam secured the Division One title and promotion to the NCEL Premier Division, with Sandygate hosting record crowds in excess of 1,100.

=== Recent history ===
The 2024–25 season, saw Hallam finish second in the regular season, beating Beverley Town on penalties in the play-off final to secure promotion to the Northern Premier League Division One East (Step 4).

Recently, the club has placed increasing emphasis on strengthening its community presence and modernizing its off-pitch operations. Hallam introduced the "1860 Members Club," which is a low-cost annual membership designed to expand fan engagement, and has regularly highlighted its role as a community focused, volunteer driven organization. Sandygate has also continued to evolve, with improvements to facilities and spectator areas accompanying rising attendances, particularly during the successful 2021–22 and 2024–25 campaigns. These seasons saw some of the club's highest crowd levels in decades and marked a period of sustained on-field progress.

In May 2026 brothers Danny and Richard Patterson took on the role of joint managers

== The Art of Passing ==
The earliest evidence of passing was found in archives of the game played between Hallam F.C. and Sheffield F.C. in 1861. Sheffield's players were utilizing long balls during the match. This is a tactic of kicking the ball far towards teammates or having them run after it. Hallam F.C. used this strategy to win the final game of the Youdan Cup. This is some of the first evidence of the through ball.

The earliest evidence of the first headed goal was also during a game between Hallam F.C. and Sheffield F.C.

== Season-by-season record ==
| Season | Division | Level | Position | FA Cup | FA Amateur Cup | FA Trophy | FA Vase | Notes |
|---|---|---|---|---|---|---|---|---|
| 1892–93 | Hallamshire League Division One | – | 5th/8 | – | – | – | – | |
| 1893–94 | Sheffield Minor Cup League (qualifying) | – | 8th/8 | – | – | – | – | |
| 1894–95 | Sheffield Minor Cup League (qualifying); Hatchard League | – | 5th/7 1st/6 | – | – | – | – | Lost league play-off |
| 1895–96 | Sheffield Minor Cup League (qualifying); Hatchard League | – | 4th/6 | – | – | – | – | |
| 1896–97 | Sheffield Alliance League Division Two | – | 6th/12 | – | – | – | – | |
| 1897–98 | Sheffield Alliance League | – | 2nd/11 | – | – | – | – | |
| 1898–99 | Hatchard League | – | 2nd/11 | – | – | – | – | |
| 1899–1900 | Hatchard League | – | | – | – | – | – | |
| 1900–01 | Hatchard League | – | | – | – | – | – | |
| 1901–02 | Hatchard League | – | | – | – | – | – | |
| 1902–03 | Hatchard League | – | 2nd/8 | – | – | – | – | League champions (won play-off) |
| 1903–04 | Hatchard League | – | 1st/11 | – | – | – | – | Lost league play-off |
| 1904–05 | Hatchard League | – | 1st/13 | – | – | – | – | Lost league play-off |
| 1905–06 | Sheffield Association League | – | | – | – | – | – | |
| 1906–07 | Hatchard League | – | | – | – | – | – | |
| 1907–08 | Hatchard League | – | | – | – | – | – | |
| 1908–09 | Hatchard League | – | | – | – | – | – | |
| 1909–10 | Hatchard League | – | | – | – | – | – | |
| 1910–11 | Hatchard League | – | 3rd/9 | – | – | – | – | |
| 1911–12 | Hatchard League | – | | – | – | – | – | |
| 1912–13 | Hatchard League | – | | – | – | – | – | |
| 1913–14 | Hatchard League | – | | – | – | – | – | |
| 1914–15 | Sheffield Amateur League | – | | – | 2R | – | – | |
| 1915–16 | Sheffield Minor League | – | | – | – | – | – | |
| 1916–17 | Sheffield Minor League | – | | – | – | – | – | |
| 1917–18 | Club did not enter any competitions due to World War I | | | | | | | |
| 1918–19 | Club did not enter any competitions due to World War I | | | | | | | |
| 1919–20 | Sheffield Amateur League | – | | – | 1R | – | – | |
| 1920–21 | Sheffield Amateur League | – | | – | 3QR | – | – | |
| 1921–22 | Sheffield Amateur League | – | 1st/13 | – | 3QR | – | – | Lost league play-off |
| 1922–23 | Sheffield Amateur League | – | | – | – | – | – | League champions (won play-off) |
| 1923–24 | Sheffield Amateur League | – | 4th/15 | – | 4QR | – | – | |
| 1924–25 | Sheffield Amateur League | – | | – | QF | – | – | |
| 1925–26 | Sheffield Amateur League | – | | – | 3R | – | – | |
| 1926–27 | Sheffield Amateur League | – | | PR | 1R | – | – | League champions (won play-off) |
| 1927–28 | Sheffield Association League | – | 1st/13 | 1QR | 3R | – | – | |
| 1928–29 | Sheffield Association League | – | 8th/15 | PR | 3R | – | – | |
| 1929–30 | Sheffield Association League | – | 4th/15 | PR | 2R | – | – | |
| 1930–31 | Sheffield Association League | – | | PR | 1R | – | – | |
| 1931–32 | Sheffield Association League Division Two | – | 8th/12 | PR | – | – | – | |
| 1932–33 | Sheffield Association League Division Two | – | 12th/12 | PR | – | – | – | |
| 1933–34 | Club did not enter any competitions | | | | | | | |
| 1934–35 | Club did not enter any competitions | | | | | | | |
| 1935–36 | Club did not enter any competitions | | | | | | | |
| 1936–37 | Club did not enter any competitions | | | | | | | |
| 1937–38 | Club did not enter any competitions | | | | | | | |
| 1938–39 | Club did not enter any competitions | | | | | | | |
| 1939–40 | Club did not enter any competitions | | | | | | | |
| 1940–41 | Club did not enter any competitions | | | | | | | |
| 1941–42 | Club did not enter any competitions | | | | | | | |
| 1942–43 | Club did not enter any competitions | | | | | | | |
| 1943–44 | Club did not enter any competitions | | | | | | | |
| 1944–45 | Club did not enter any competitions | | | | | | | |
| 1945–46 | Club did not enter any competitions | | | | | | | |
| 1946–47 | Club did not enter any competitions | | | | | | | |
| 1947–48 | Sheffield Amateur League | – | | – | 2QR | – | – | |
| 1948–49 | Hatchard League | – | 1st | – | 4QR | – | – | League champions |
| 1949–50 | Sheffield Association League | – | 1st/16 | – | 4QR | – | – | League champions (won play-off) |
| 1950–51 | Sheffield Association League | – | 2nd/15 | EPR | 1R | – | – | |
| 1951–52 | Sheffield Association League | – | | 1QR | 4QR | – | – | |
| 1952–53 | Yorkshire League Division Two | – | 11th/14 | 1QR | 3R | – | – | |
| 1953–54 | Yorkshire League Division Two | – | 8th/16 | 2QR | 3R | – | – | |
| 1954–55 | Yorkshire League Division Two | – | 10th/16 | 1QR | 2R | – | – | |
| 1955–56 | Yorkshire League Division Two | – | 5th/16 | 2QR | 1R | – | – | |
| 1956–57 | Yorkshire League Division Two | – | 2nd/17 | 1QR | 1R | – | – | Promoted |
| 1957–58 | Yorkshire League Division One | – | 14th/18 | 3QR | 4QR | – | – | |
| 1958–59 | Yorkshire League Division One | – | 14th/18 | 2QR | 3R | – | – | |
| 1959–60 | Yorkshire League Division One | – | 17th/18 | – | 2R | – | – | Relegated |
| 1960–61 | Yorkshire League Division Two | – | 1st/19 | – | 3R | – | – | League champions, promoted |
| 1961–62 | Yorkshire League Division One | – | 8th/16 | – | 1R | – | – | |
| 1962–63 | Yorkshire League Division One | – | 12th/16 | – | 1R | – | – | |
| 1963–64 | Yorkshire League Division One | – | 10th/16 | – | 4QR | – | – | |
| 1964–65 | Yorkshire League Division One | – | 11th/16 | – | 1QR | – | – | |
| 1965–66 | Yorkshire League Division One | – | 12th/16 | – | 1QR | – | – | |
| 1966–67 | Yorkshire League Division One | – | 10th/17 | – | 1R | – | – | |
| 1967–68 | Yorkshire League Division One | – | 15th/17 | – | 1R | – | – | |
| 1968–69 | Yorkshire League Division One | – | 13th/18 | – | 1R | – | – | |
| 1969–70 | Yorkshire League Division One | – | 10th/18 | – | 4QR | – | – | |
| 1970–71 | Yorkshire League Division One | – | 5th/14 | – | 4QR | – | – | |
| 1971–72 | Yorkshire League Division One | – | 9th/16 | – | 1R | – | – | |
| 1972–73 | Yorkshire League Division One | – | 10th/16 | – | 4QR | – | – | |
| 1973–74 | Yorkshire League Division One | – | 5th/16 | – | 3QR | – | – | |
| 1974–75 | Yorkshire League Division One | – | 7th/16 | – | – | PR | – | |
| 1975–76 | Yorkshire League Division One | – | 3rd/16 | – | – | – | 4R | |
| 1976–77 | Yorkshire League Division One | – | 7th/16 | – | – | – | 4R | |
| 1977–78 | Yorkshire League Division One | – | 6th/16 | – | – | – | 3R | |
| 1978–79 | Yorkshire League Division One | – | 10th/16 | – | – | – | 2R | |
| 1979–80 | Yorkshire League Division One | – | 7th/16 | – | – | – | 3R | |
| 1980–81 | Yorkshire League Division One | – | 9th/16 | – | – | – | 5R | |
| 1981–82 | Yorkshire League Division One | – | 12th/16 | – | – | – | 4R | |
| 1982–83 | Northern Counties East League Division One South | – | 10th/14 | – | – | – | 3R | |
| 1983–84 | Northern Counties East League Division One South | – | 9th/14 | – | – | – | 2R | |
| 1984–85 | Northern Counties East League Division One South | – | 9th/16 | – | – | – | 1R | |
| 1985–86 | Northern Counties East League Division Two | – | 5th/16 | – | – | – | 1R | Promoted |
| 1986–87 | Northern Counties East League Division One | – | 6th/18 | – | – | – | 2R | Promoted |
| 1987–88 | Northern Counties East League Premier Division | – | 10th/17 | – | – | – | 1R | |
| 1988–89 | Northern Counties East League Premier Division | – | 12th/17 | – | – | – | PR | |
| 1989–90 | Northern Counties East League Premier Division | – | 14th/18 | – | – | – | EPR | Relegated |
| 1990–91 | Northern Counties East League Division One | – | 2nd/13 | – | – | – | EPR | |
| 1991–92 | Northern Counties East League Division One | – | 5th/16 | – | – | – | 1R | |
| 1992–93 | Northern Counties East League Division One | – | 3rd/14 | – | – | – | PR | |
| 1993–94 | Northern Counties East League Division One | – | 2nd/15 | – | – | – | 1R | Promoted |
| 1994–95 | Northern Counties East League Premier Division | – | 17th/20 | 1QR | – | – | PR | |
| 1995–96 | Northern Counties East League Premier Division | – | 17th/20 | 1QR | – | – | 1QR | |
| 1996–97 | Northern Counties East League Premier Division | – | 7th/20 | PR | – | – | 3R | |
| 1997–98 | Northern Counties East League Premier Division | – | 17th/20 | – | – | – | 2QR | |
| 1998–99 | Northern Counties East League Premier Division | – | 4th/20 | – | – | – | 2R | |
| 1999–2000 | Northern Counties East League Premier Division | – | 12th/20 | PR | – | – | 1QR | |
| 2000–01 | Northern Counties East League Premier Division | – | 5th/20 | PR | – | – | 2QR | |
| 2001–02 | Northern Counties East League Premier Division | – | 3rd/20 | 1QR | – | – | 3R | |
| 2002–03 | Northern Counties East League Premier Division | – | 17th/20 | 1QR | – | – | 1R | |
| 2003–04 | Northern Counties East League Premier Division | – | 15th/20 | PR | – | – | 2R | |
| 2004–05 | Northern Counties East League Premier Division | 9 | 15th/20 | PR | – | – | 1R | |
| 2005–06 | Northern Counties East League Premier Division | 9 | 17th/20 | PR | – | – | 1QR | |
| 2006–07 | Northern Counties East League Premier Division | 9 | 14th/20 | 2QR | – | – | 1QR | |
| 2007–08 | Northern Counties East League Premier Division | 9 | 6th/20 | 1QR | – | – | 3R | |
| 2008–09 | Northern Counties East League Premier Division | 9 | 10th/20 | EPR | – | – | 1R | |
| 2009–10 | Northern Counties East League Premier Division | 9 | 15th/20 | 1QR | – | – | 2R | |
| 2010–11 | Northern Counties East League Premier Division | 9 | 19th/20 | EPR | – | – | 1R | Relegated |
| 2011–12 | Northern Counties East League Division One | 10 | 14th/20 | EPR | – | – | 1QR | |
| 2012–13 | Northern Counties East League Division One | 10 | 12th/22 | EPR | – | – | 1QR | |
| 2013–14 | Northern Counties East League Division One | 10 | 20th/22 | – | – | – | 1QR | |
| 2014–15 | Northern Counties East League Division One | 10 | 14th/22 | – | – | – | 2QR | |
| 2015–16 | Northern Counties East League Division One | 10 | 6th/21 | – | – | – | 2R | |
| 2016–17 | Northern Counties East League Division One | 10 | 5th/22 | EPR | – | – | 2R | |
| 2017–18 | Northern Counties East League Division One | 10 | 8th/22 | PR | – | – | 2QR | |
| 2018–19 | Northern Counties East League Division One | 10 | 3rd/20 | EPR | – | – | 2R | |
| 2019–20 | Northern Counties East League Division One | 10 | – | EPR | – | – | 1QR | League season abandoned due to COVID-19 pandemic |
| 2020–21 | Northern Counties East League Division One | 10 | – | – | – | – | 2R | League season abandoned due to COVID-19 pandemic |
| 2021–22 | Northern Counties East League Division One | 10 | 1st/21 | – | – | – | 1QR | League champions, promoted |
| 2022–23 | Northern Counties East League Premier Division | 9 | 6th/20 | EPR | – | – | 2R | |
| 2023–24 | Northern Counties East League Premier Division | 9 | 9th/20 | EPR | – | – | 5R | |
| 2024–25 | Northern Counties East League Premier Division | 9 | 2nd/20 | 2QR | – | – | 4R | Play-off winners, promoted |
| 2025–26 | Northern Premier League Division One East | 8 | 12th/22 | 1QR | – | 1QR | – | |
| Season | Division | Level | Position | FA Cup | FA Amateur Cup | FA Trophy | FA Vase | Notes |
Source: Football Club History Database

== Current squad ==
As of 19 August 2026

Note: Flags indicate national team as defined under FIFA eligibility rules; some limited exceptions apply. Players may hold more than one non-FIFA nationality.

| No. | Pos. | Nation | Player |
|---|---|---|---|
| — | GK | ENG | Jonathan Hedge |
| — | GK | ENG | Harry Rainey |
| — | GK | ENG | Jake Townsend |
| — | GK | ENG | Hugo Warhurst (vice-captain) |
| — | DF | ENG | Paulo Aguas |
| — | DF | ENG | Dan Burns |
| — | DF | ENG | Stephen Brogan |
| — | DF | ENG | Jack Brownell |
| — | DF | ZIM | Bolton Makwedza |
| — | DF | ENG | Jesse Omoregbee |
| — | DF | CZE | Daniel Pudil |
| — | DF | ENG | Jacob Priestnall |
| — | DF | ENG | Jamie Sharman |
| — | DF | ENG | Alfie Smith |
| — | DF | ENG | Tyler Williams |
| — | MF | ENG | Adam Blakeley |
| — | MF | ENG | Daniel Booth |
| — | MF | ENG | Brandon Bradbury |
| — | MF | ENG | James Cadman |
| — | MF | ENG | Kiyani Clayton |
| — | MF | ENG | Ted Cribley |

| No. | Pos. | Nation | Player |
|---|---|---|---|
| — | MF | ENG | Jack Dolman |
| — | MF | ENG | Jay Glover |
| — | MF | ENG | Tom Hinton |
| — | MF | ENG | Nathan Keightley |
| — | MF | POL | Janni Lipka |
| — | MF | ENG | James Matthews |
| — | MF | ENG | Ollie Russon |
| — | MF | GAM | Bubacar Sama |
| — | MF | ENG | Charlie Staniland |
| — | MF | ENG | Mason Warren |
| — | FW | ENG | Harry Day |
| — | FW | ENG | Scott Fenwick |
| — | FW | ENG | Kurtis Havenhand |
| — | FW | ENG | Leon Howarth |
| — | FW | ENG | Brodie Litchfield |
| — | FW | ZIM | Benni Ndlovu |
| — | FW | ENG | Rhys Plater |
| — | FW | ENG | Harrison Poulter |
| — | FW | ENG | Danai Rhule |
| — | FW | ENG | Shaun Tuton |
| — | FW | ENG | Calum Ward |

== Current staff ==
Danny Patterson and Richard Patterson - Manager

Wayne Thompson and Rob Poulter - Assistant Managers

Andy Emsley and Matt Chatfield - Coaches

Ryan Pugh - Goalkeeping Coach

Harry Oldroyd and Georgie Gibbs – Physiotherapist

=== Notable former players ===
Players that have played in the Football League either before or after playing for Hallam –

- Michael Boulding
- Brian Broadhurst
- Andy Brownrigg
- Sean Connelly
- Tony Crane
- Harry Deacon
- Sean Dunphy
- David Faulkner
- Fred Furniss
- George Handley
- Brian Linighan
- Billy Mosforth
- Mick Pickering
- Joe Skarz
- Mark Smith
- Chris Waddle
- Jack Whitham

== Ground ==
Sandygate, Crosspool, Sheffield, UK, S10 5SE.

Sandygate is a football and cricket stadium in the Sheffield suburb of Crosspool, South Yorkshire, England. It is home to Hallam F.C. and Hallam C.C.

First opened in 1804, Hallam have played at the ground since 1860. Sandygate has been recognised by the Guinness Book of Records as the "Oldest Football Ground in the World". On 26 December 1860, the world's first inter-club football match was played at the ground, Hallam F.C. taking on Sheffield F.C. The pitch at Sandygate is quite unique itself, the stadium is built upon a slope leaving players to compete on a slight incline.

The ground offers viewing for spectators from 3 sides of the pitch. The Shed End, the Main Stand and the Cricket Net End.

The Shed End

The Shed End is a covered terrace behind the goal on the Sandygate Road side of the ground. This mainly houses the vocal home supporters and is where the bulk of the atmosphere is created.

=== Gallery ===
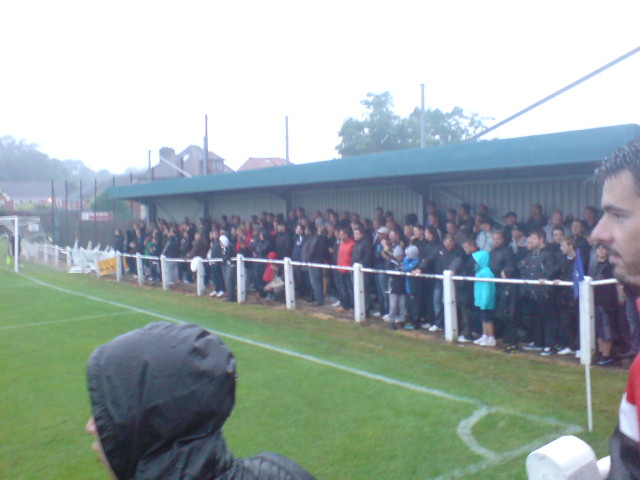
The cover at the north side of the ground in 2010

The refurbished clubhouse and main stand in 2014

The pitch, with cricket ground at the west end of the ground, in 2014

Hallam (in blue) on the attack in an NCEL match against Louth Town in 2014. The new clubhouse and main stand are in the background

World record certificate for Sandygate

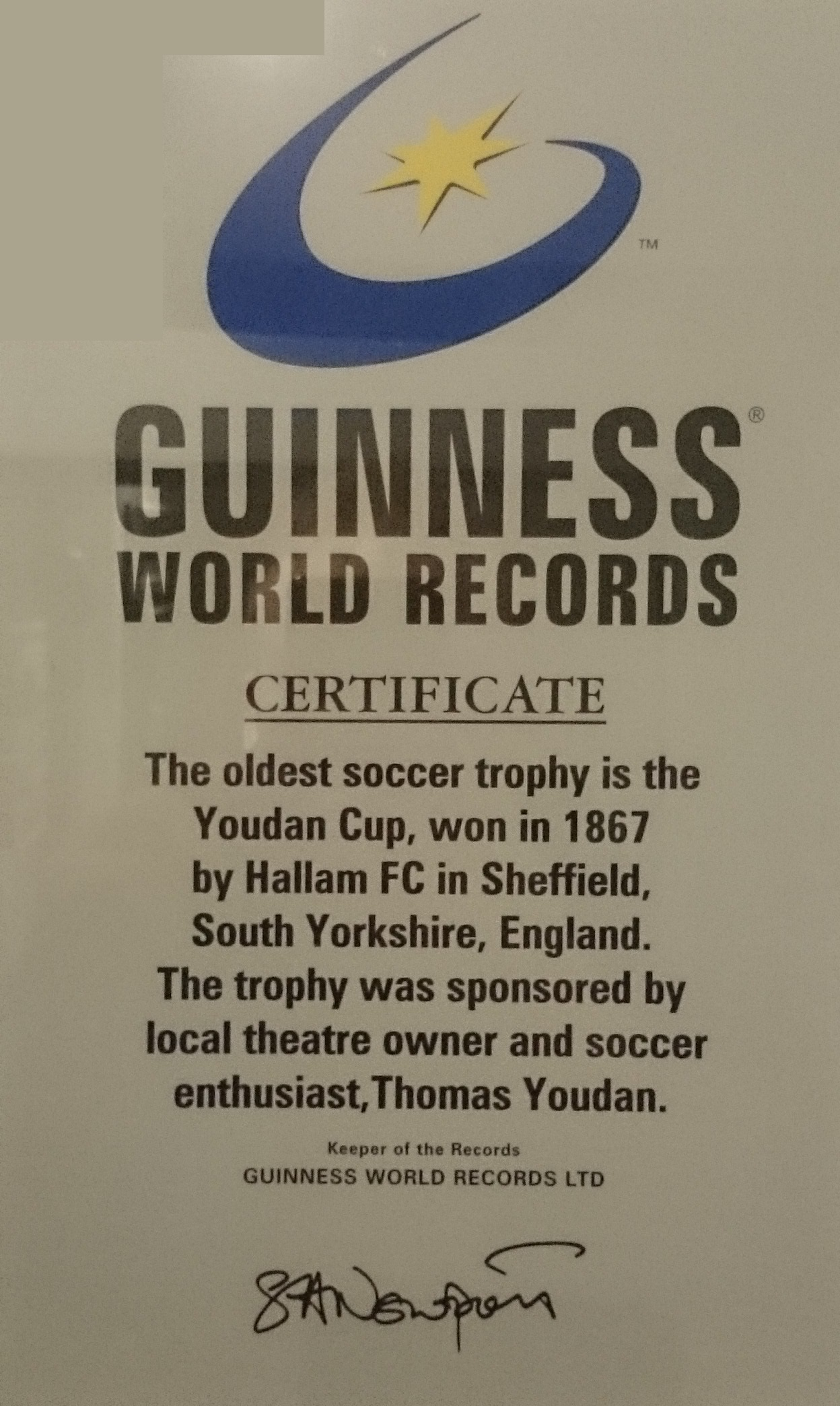
World record certificate for the Youdan Cup win

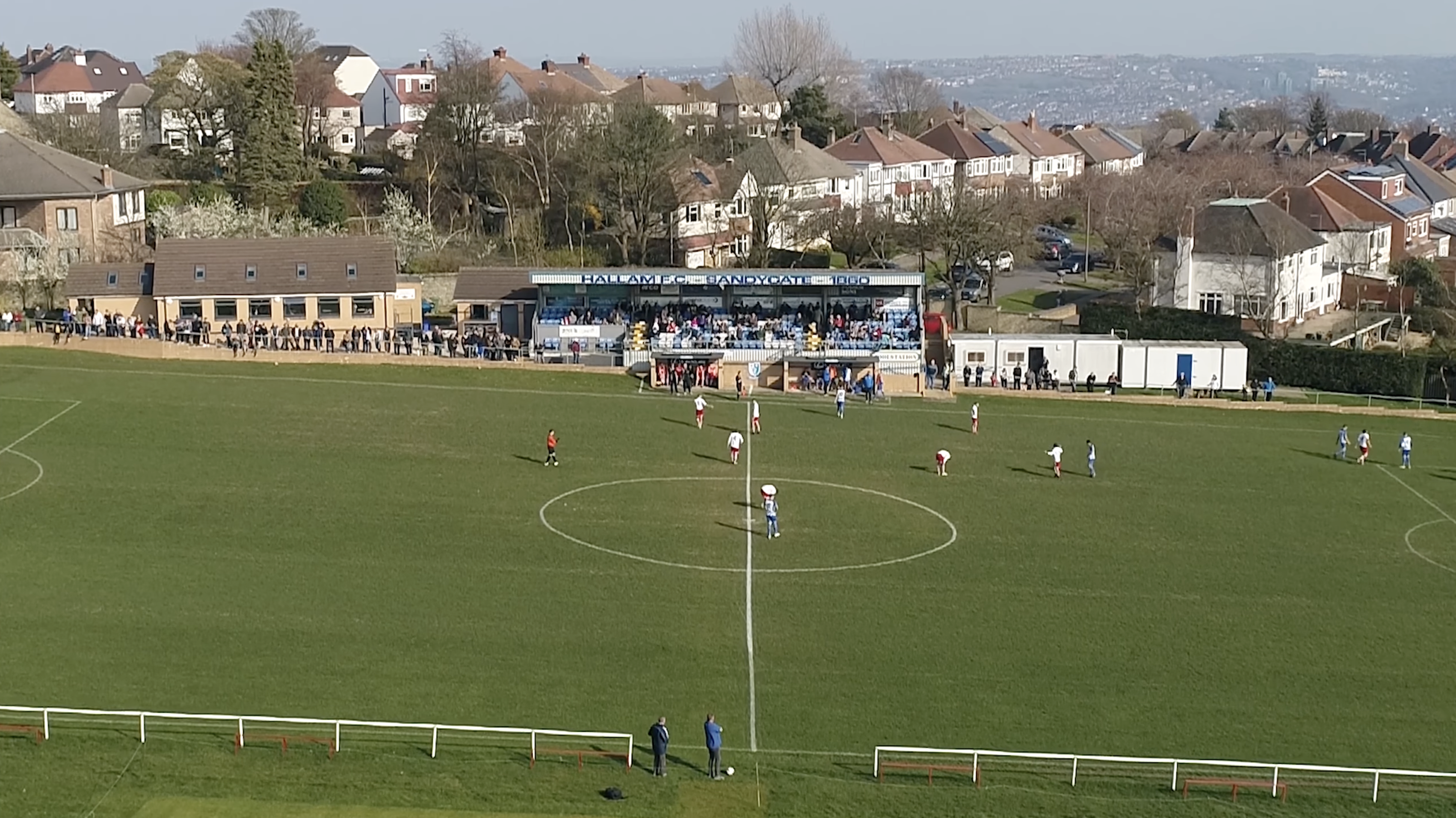
This picture shows the field Hallam F.C. played on called Sandygate. This particular photo allows people to see the degree of incline the players played on.

== Honours ==
=== League ===
- Yorkshire League Division Two
  - Champions –1960–61
  - Promoted – 1956–57
- Northern Counties East League

Premier Division

  - Play Offs Winners (promoted) - 2024-25

Division One

  - Champions – 2021–22
  - Promoted – 1993–94
- Sheffield Association League
  - Champions – 1949–50
- Hatchard League
  - Champions – 1902–03, 1948–49
- Sheffield Amateur League
  - Champions: 1922–23, 1926–27

=== Cup ===
- Sheffield & Hallamshire Senior Cup
  - Winners – 1950–51, 1961–62, 1964–65, 1967–68
  - Runners-up – 1903–04, 2009–10, 2024–25
- Northern Counties East League Cup
  - Winners – 2003–04
- Youdan Cup
  - Winners – 1867

== Records ==
- Best FA Cup performance: Third qualifying round, 1957–58
- Best FA Amateur Cup performance: Quarter-finals, 1924–25
- Best FA Trophy performance: First qualifying round, 2025–26
- Best FA Vase performance: Fifth round, 1980–81, 2023–24
- Record attendance – 2,000 vs. Hendon, FA Amateur Cup, 1958–59 (at Hillsborough – 13,855 vs. Dulwich Hamlet, FA Amateur Cup, 1952–53)
