= Thomas Pickering =

Thomas Pickering may refer to:

- Thomas Pickering (martyr) (c. 1621–1679), English religious leader
- Thomas R. Pickering (born 1931), American diplomat—UN Ambassador
- Thomas G. Pickering (1940–2009), professor of medicine at Columbia University Medical Center
- Tom Pickering (footballer) (1906-unknown), English footballer
- Tom Pickering, fictional character in Hated in the Nation

== See also ==
- Timothy Pickering (1745–1829), American diplomat—Secretary of State
