= Sean Dunphy (footballer) =

English footballer (born 1970)

Personal information
- Date of birth: 5 November 1970 (age 55)
- Place of birth: Maltby, England
- Position: Defender

Youth career
- 1987–1989: Barnsley

Senior career*
Years	Team	Apps	(Gls)
1989–1990	Barnsley	6	(0)
1990–1995	Lincoln City	53	(2)
1993–1994	→ Doncaster Rovers (loan)	1	(0)
1994–1995	→ Scarborough (loan)	10	(0)
1994–1995	Kettering Town	1	(0)
1994–1995	Gainsborough Trinity	4	(0)
1994–1995	→Halifax Town (dual-registration)	2	(0)
1996–2000	Stocksbridge Park Steels		
- * Club domestic league appearances and goals

Sean Dunphy (born 5 November 1970) is an English former footballer. He played as a centre-back and made 70 appearances in the Football League, principally for Lincoln City.

== League career ==
Dunphy began his career with Barnsley before following manager Allan Clarke to Lincoln City in the summer of 1990. However, disaster struck Dunphy in a pre-season match against Leeds United when he was stretchered off with a serious knee injury. The injury would keep him out of action for almost two years and it was not until April 1992 that Dunphy made his debut for Lincoln. The 1992–93 season saw Dunphy establish a regular berth at the heart of Lincoln's defence and he would go on to make 31 league appearances that season. The 1993–94 season saw Lincoln, under the stewardship of new manager Keith Alexander, make a sticky start collecting just four points from the first six league games. Following the 1–0 home defeat to Mansfield Town on 11 September 1993, Alexander transfer-listed most of his squad and dropped a number of players, including Dunphy, from the team. Dunphy soon linked up with Doncaster Rovers on loan, making a solitary league appearance against Bury on 16 October 1993 before returning to Sincil Bank. He returned to the team towards the end of the season but found himself loaned out to Scarborough at the commencement of the 1994–95 season.

== Non-league career ==
In February 1995 he joined the then Football Conference side Kettering Town where he made a single appearance before dropping down to the Northern Premier League and joining Gainsborough Trinity. After just two games he stepped back up to Conference joining Halifax Town where he made his debut in the 0–0 away draw with Bath City on 27 March 1995. He was substituted at half-time in his next, and final, appearance and returned to Gainsborough Trinity for the remainder of the season.

At the beginning of the 1996–97 season, Dunphy joined Stocksbridge Park Steels and enjoyed the most productive period of his career. He made a total of 139 appearances for the Steels, scoring seven times before moving on to Hallam.

In February 2008 he was appointed club coach at hometown club Maltby Main working under the newly appointed manager Robbie Barron. Barron succeeded in keeping Main in the Northern Counties East League Premier Division but resigned at the end of the season due to work commitments and it remains to be seen whether Dunphy followed him.
