= Fred Furniss =

English footballer

Personal information
- Full name: Frederick Furniss
- Date of birth: 10 July 1922
- Place of birth: Sheffield, England
- Date of death: 10 April 2017 (aged 94)
- Position: Full-back

Senior career*
| Years | Team | Apps | (Gls) |
| 1946–1955 | Sheffield United | 279 | (14) |
| 1955 | Chesterfield | 0 | (0) |
- * Club domestic league appearances and goals

Frederick Furniss (10 July 1922 – 10 April 2017) was an English footballer who played in the position of full-back for Sheffield United.

== Playing career ==
Furniss started his career with Hallam, and was given his chance to play for United in Wartime (1941), along with Albert Nightingale, in a 3–3 draw against Everton at Goodison Park during an air-raid.

He signed his first professional contract with the club in 1946 once the football league was re-established after the war, and he established himself in the Blades defence, along with fellow full-back Eddie Shimwell.

He was very fast and difficult to outwit, and played in every match in the United team that won the Second Division in 1952–53. Furniss was the Blades recognised penalty taker in his time at the Lane and never missed a penalty for the Blades.

He made 433 appearances in all competitions for the club, scoring 18 goals. He also total he played 279 league matches for Sheffield United between 1945 and 1954 scoring 14 goals. In 1955, he joined Chesterfield, but never played a match for that club.

Furniss, who was a member of the Senior Blades and was also a season-ticket holder, is featured on the Wall of Fame in at the Legends of the Lane facility at Bramall Lane. He was also a keen crown green bowler.

Furniss died on 10 April 2017.
