= David Faulkner (footballer) =

English footballer

Personal information
- Date of birth: 8 October 1975 (age 51)
- Place of birth: Sheffield, England
- Height: 6 ft 1 in (1.85 m)
- Position: Defender

Senior career*
Years	Team	Apps	(Gls)
1992–1996	Sheffield Wednesday	0	(0)
1996–1997	Darlington	4	(0)
	Gainsborough Trinity	?	(?)
	Alfreton Town	?	(?)
	Hallam	?	(?)
	Waterford United	?	(?)
	Gresley Rovers	?	(?)
2001–2004	Sheffield FC	?	(?)

International career
1990–1994	England U16-U18	12	(0)
- * Club domestic league appearances and goals

David Faulkner (born 8 October 1975) is an English former footballer who played as a defender for Darlington in the Football League.
