= George Pickering =

George Pickering may refer to:

- George Pickering (poet) (1758–1826), English poet and songwriter
- George Pickering (cricketer) (1832–1858), Australian cricketer
- George Pickering (politician) (died 1876), Australian politician
- George Pickering (physician) (1904–1980), British medical doctor and academic
