= Judge Pickering =

Judge Pickering may refer to:

- Charles W. Pickering (born 1937), judge of the United States District Court for the Southern District of Mississippi and of the United States Court of Appeals for the Fifth Circuit
- John Pickering (judge) (1737–1805), judge of the United States District Court for the District of New Hampshire

== See also ==
- Justice Pickering (disambiguation)
