= Sandygate (stadium) =

Sports ground in Crosspool, South Yorkshire, England

Coordinates: 53.376375°N 1.531225°W

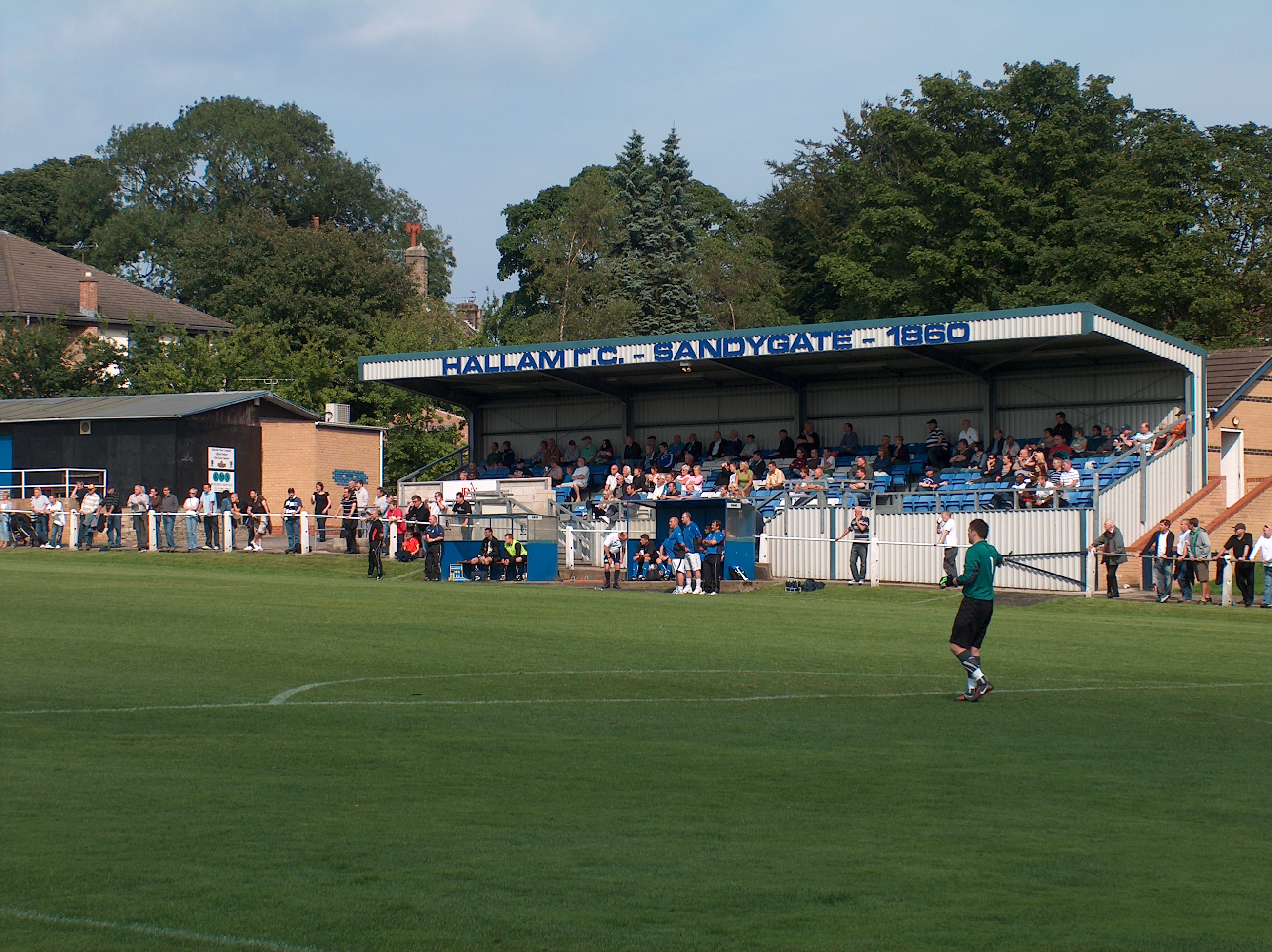
- Interactive map of Sandygate
- Location: Crosspool, Sheffield, England
- Owner: Hallam F.C.
- Operator: Hallam F.C.
- Capacity: 1,665 (250 seated)
- Surface: grass

Construction
- Built: 1804
- Opened: 1804

Tenants
- Hallam F.C., Hallam C.C.

Sandygate is a football and cricket stadium in the Sheffield suburb of Crosspool, South Yorkshire, England. It is home to Hallam F.C. and Hallam C.C.

First opened in 1804, Hallam F.C. have played at the ground since 1860. Sandygate has been recognised by the Guinness Book of Records as the "Oldest Football Ground in the World". On 26 December 1860, the world's first inter-club football match was played at the ground, Hallam taking on Sheffield F.C.

The ground offers viewing for spectators from 3 sides of the pitch, the Shed End, the Main Stand and the Cricket Net End.

== The Shed End ==
The Shed End is a covered terrace behind the goal on Sandygate Road. This mainly houses the vocal home supporters and is where the bulk of the atmosphere is created.

The certificate for the record of being the oldest football ground in the world

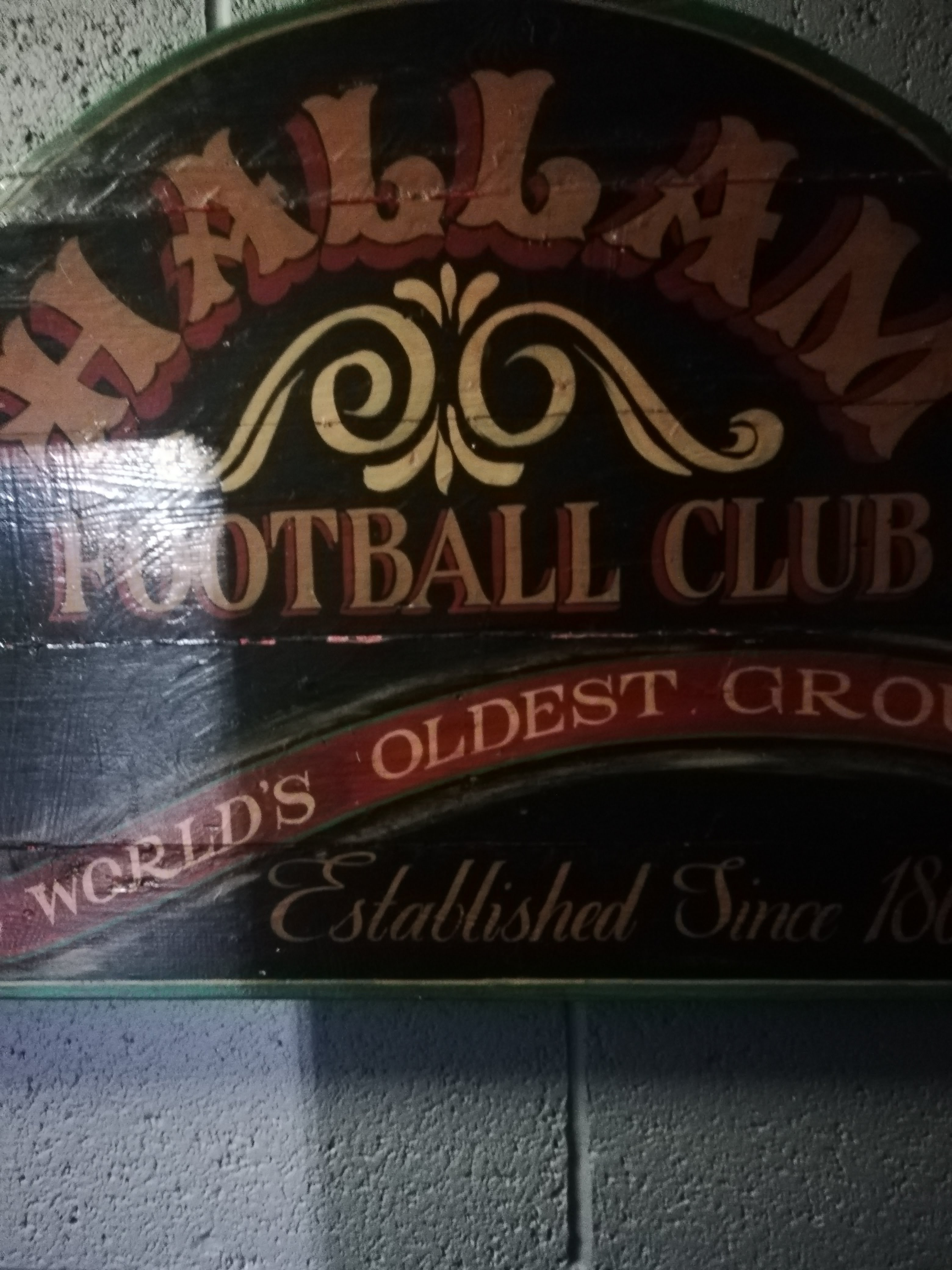
Plaque

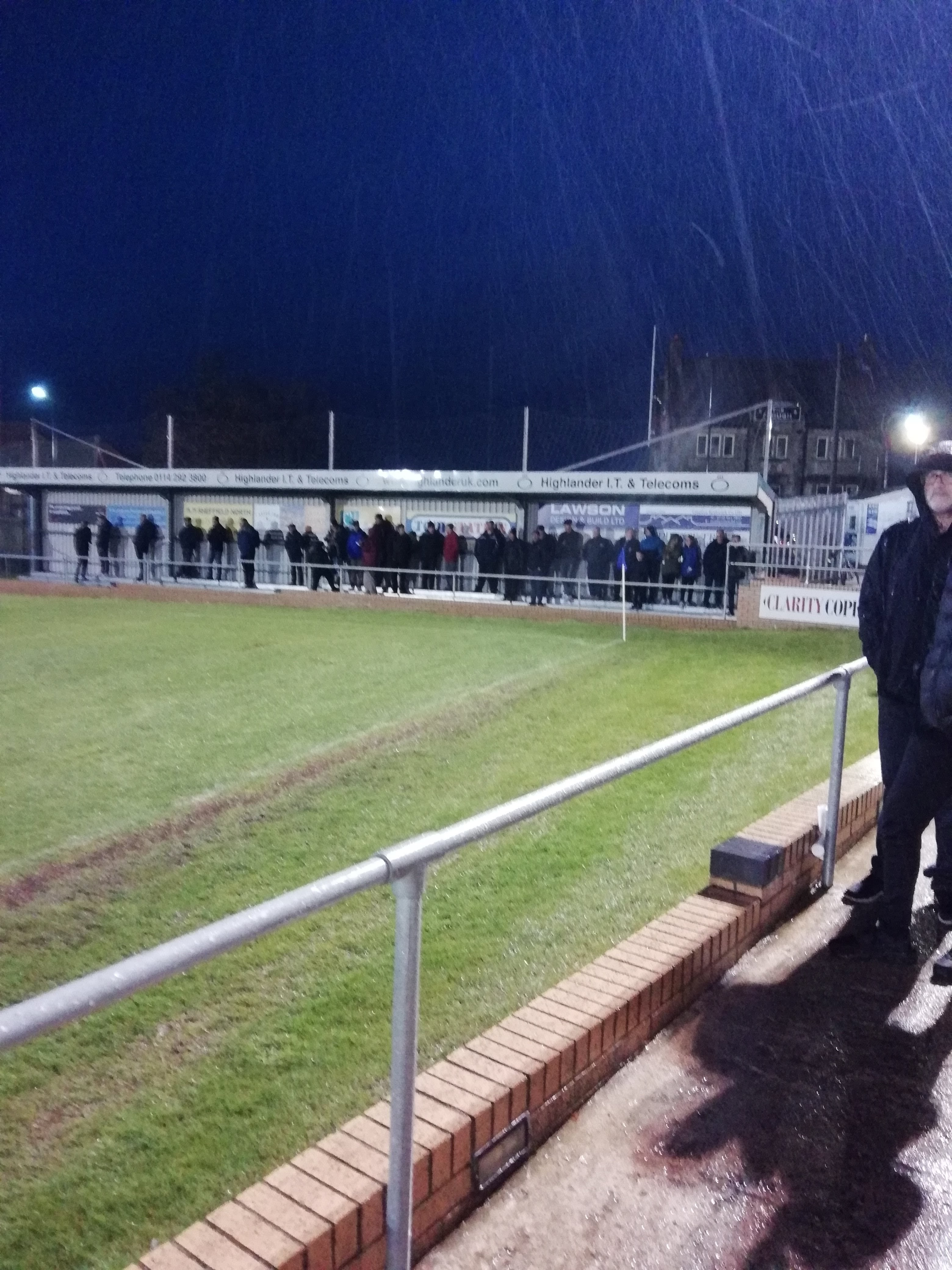
The "Shed End"

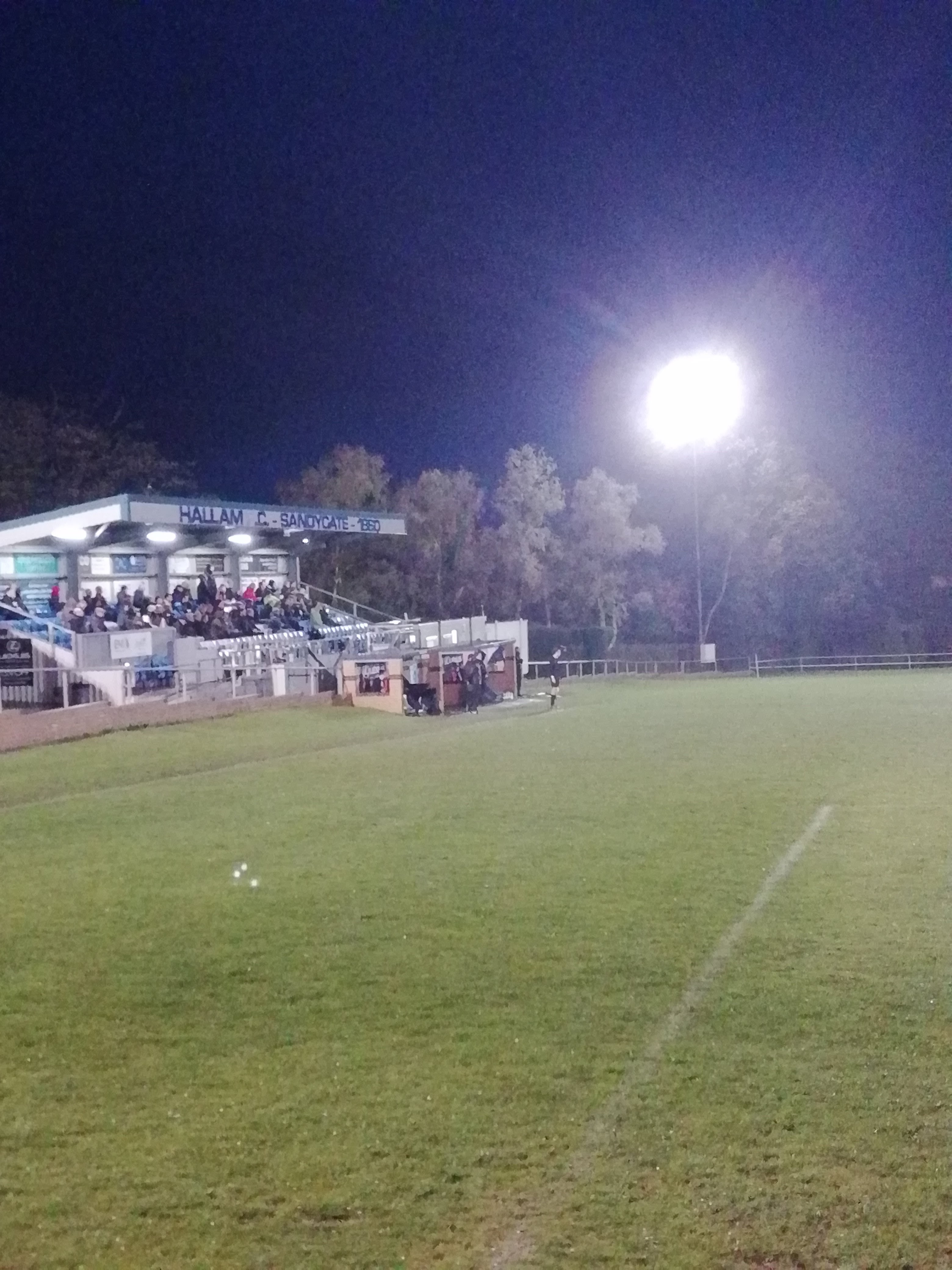
View of the main stand
