= William Pickering =

William Pickering may refer to:

== Politicians ==
- William Pickering (Australian politician) (1869-1953), Western Australian state MP
- William Pickering (governor) (1798–1873), Republican governor of Washington territory, 1862–1866
- William A. Pickering (1840–1907), first Protector appointed by the British government to administer the Chinese Protectorate in colonial Singapore
- William Pickering (British MP) for Warwick (UK Parliament constituency)

== Sports ==
- William Pickering (cricketer) (1819–1905), organiser of the first overseas cricket tour by an English side
- Bill Pickering (Australian footballer) (1879–1939), Australian footballer for St Kilda
- William Pickering (footballer) (1894–1917), Scottish-born association football player, playing for English team Burnley
- Bill Pickering (footballer, born 1901) (1901–1971), English-born professional footballer, playing for English and Welsh teams
- Bill Pickering (footballer, born 1919) (1919-1983), English footballer, see List of Oldham Athletic A.F.C. players (25–99 appearances)

== Others ==
- William Pickering (fiction), director of the National Reconnaissance Office in Dan Brown's book Deception Point
- William Pickering (publisher) (1796–1854), British publisher and bookseller
- William H. Pickering (engineer) (1910–2004), director of the NASA/Caltech Jet Propulsion Laboratory from 1954 to 1976
- William Henry Pickering (1858–1938), American astronomer
