= Mick Pickering =

English footballer

Personal information
- Full name: Michael John Pickering
- Date of birth: 29 September 1956 (age 70)
- Place of birth: Mirfield, England
- Height: 5 ft 11 in (1.80 m)
- Position: Central defender

Senior career*
Years	Team	Apps	(Gls)
1974–1977	Barnsley	100	(1)
1977–1978	Southampton	44	(0)
1978–1984	Sheffield Wednesday	110	(2)
1981	→ San Diego Sockers (loan)	12	(0)
1983	→ Norwich City (loan)	1	(0)
1983	→ Bradford City (loan)	4	(0)
1984	→ Barnsley (loan)	3	(0)
1984–1986	Rotherham United	102	(1)
1986–1987	York City	32	(1)
1987–1989	Stockport County	16	(0)
- Hallam
Total		424	(4)
- * Club domestic league appearances and goals

Michael John Pickering (born 29 September 1956) is an English former professional footballer who played as a central defender.

== Career ==
Born in Mirfield, Pickering played for Barnsley, Southampton, Sheffield Wednesday, Norwich City, Bradford City, Rotherham United, York City, Stockport County and Hallam.
