= John Pickering =

John Pickering may refer to:

- John Pickering (dramatist), English author of the play Horestes first published in 1567
- John Pickering (MP) (1585–1628), MP for Northamptonshire, 1626
- John Pickering (soldier) (died 1645), colonel of a regiment in the New Model Army
- John Pickering (judge) (1737–1805), American politician and judge
- John Pickering (Massachusetts politician), List of speakers of the Massachusetts House of Representatives
- John Pickering (linguist) (1777–1846), American linguist
- John Pickering (Australian politician) (1814–1891), South Australian politician
- John Pickering (footballer, born 1884) (1844-1964), English footballer, see List of Bury F.C. players (1–24 appearances)
- John Pickering (musician) (1933–2011), lead singer with The Picks, US vocal trio of the 1950s
- John E. Pickering (1918–1997) pioneer in the field of radiobiology, aviation medicine and space medicine and a Colonel in the United States Air Force
- John Frederick Pickering (1939–2018), professor and economic and business consultant, former member of the Monopolies and Mergers Commission and church commissioner
- John H. Pickering (1916–2005), founding partner of Wilmer, Cutler & Pickering, which became one of Washington D.C.'s most prominent law firms
- John Pickering (footballer) (1944–2001), professional footballer, coach and manager

== See also ==
- Jack Pickering (1908–1977), English footballer
