= 1996–97 FA Cup qualifying rounds =

Tournament details
- Country: England; Wales

The 1996–97 FA Cup qualifying rounds opened the 116th season of competition in England for 'The Football Association Challenge Cup' (FA Cup), the world's oldest association football single knockout competition. A total of 574 clubs were accepted for the competition, down one from the previous season's 575.

The large number of clubs entering the tournament from lower down (Levels 5 through 8) in the English football pyramid meant that the competition started with five rounds of preliminary (1) and qualifying (4) knockouts for these non-League teams. The 28 winning teams from fourth round qualifying progressed to the First round proper, where League teams tiered at Levels 3 and 4 entered the competition.

== Calendar ==
Round	Start date	New Entries	Clubs
Preliminary round	Saturday 31 August 1996	340	574 → 404
First round qualifying	Saturday 14 September 1996	118	404 → 260
Second round qualifying	Saturday 28 September 1996	none	260 → 188
Third round qualifying	Saturday 12 October 1996	none	188 → 152
Fourth round qualifying	Saturday 26 October 1996	20	152 → 124
First round proper	Saturday 16 November 1996	52	124 → 84
Second round proper	Saturday 7 December 1996	none	84 → 64
Third round proper	Saturday 4 January 1997	44	64 → 32
Fourth round proper	Saturday 25 January 1997	none	32 → 16
Fifth round proper	Saturday 15 February 1997	none	16 → 8
Sixth round proper	Saturday 8 March 1997	none	8 → 4
Semi-finals	Saturday 13 April 1997	none	4 → 2
Final	Saturday 17 May 1997	none	2 → 1

== Preliminary round ==
=== Ties ===
Tie	Home team	Score	Away team
1	A F C Lymington	6-1	Windsor & Eton
2	Alnwick Town	0-0	Consett
3	Arlesey Town	3-1	Potton United
4	Arundel	3-0	Canterbury City
5	Ashford Town (Middx)	2-0	Slade Green
6	Ashington	4-5	Ashfield United
7	Banbury United	0-1	V S Rugby
8	Barwell	0-2	Bilston Town
9	Basildon United	0-2	Woodbridge Town
10	Bedfont	1-2	Tunbridge Wells
11	Bedworth United	2-2	Paget Rangers
12	Belper Town	1-1	Leigh R M I
13	Bemerton Heath Harlequins	2-0	Bicester Town
14	Berkhamsted Town	2-3	Chesham United
15	Biggleswade Town	0-1	London Colney
16	Blackpool Rovers	1-2	Hucknall Town
17	Blakenall	3-0	Glossop North End
18	Bootle	2-0	Seaham Red Star
19	Bournemouth	1-3	Abingdon Town
20	Bowers United	2-1	Hanwell Town
21	Brandon United	3-1	Tadcaster Albion
22	Bridport	0-1	Clevedon Town
23	Brimsdown Rovers	1-3	Tring Town
24	Burgess Hill Town	4-1	Epsom & Ewell
25	Burnham Ramblers	1-1	Great Yarmouth Town
26	Bury Town	4-1	Milton Keynes
27	Chasetown	2-0	Boldmere St Michaels
28	Cheadle Town	0-0	Burscough
29	Cirencester Town	1-0	Yate Town
30	Concord Rangers	2-2	Barking
31	Corby Town	5-1	Eynesbury Rovers
32	Corinthian Casuals	1-1	Chipstead
33	Cornard United	0-2	Gorleston
34	Cove	1-0	Ash United
35	Croydon Athletic	2-0	Lewes
36	Dartford	1-1	Horsham
37	Devizes Town	2-0	Westbury United
38	Droylsden	1-5	Stocksbridge Park Steels
39	Dudley Town	1-3	Tamworth
40	East Grinstead	2-3	Folkestone Invicta
41	East Thurrock United	4-2	Mirrlees Blackstone
42	Eastleigh	0-3	Hungerford Town
43	Eastwood Hanley	0-1	Crook Town
44	Eccleshill United	2-1	Hallam
45	Edgware Town	1-1	Flackwell Heath
46	Endsleigh	0-3	Bristol Manor Farm
47	Erith & Belvedere	2-2	Kingsbury Town
48	Esh Winning	1-3	Oldham Town
49	Evenwood Town	3-1	Darwen
50	Fakenham Town	2-2	Maldon Town
51	Falmouth Town	3-0	Barnstaple Town
52	Felixstowe Port & Town	0-1	Clapton
53	Ferryhill Athletic	1-2	Yorkshire Amateur
54	Fleet Town	2-0	Waterlooville
55	Flixton	4-1	R T M Newcastle
56	Ford United	1-0	Harwich & Parkeston
57	Frome Town	3-0	Elmore
58	Glasshoughton Welfare	1-2	Matlock Town
59	Glastonbury	2-4	Calne Town
60	Godalming & Guildford	5-2	Carterton Town
61	Gosport Borough	2-1	Ryde
62	Hailsham Town	2-2	Redhill
63	Halesowen Harriers	2-2	Long Buckby
64	Harefield United	2-4	Halstead Town
65	Haringey Borough	0-3	Hornchurch
66	Harrogate Railway Athletic	5-2	Stockton
67	Harrogate Town	6-0	Whitley Bay
68	Harworth Colliery Institute	0-0	Blidworth Welfare
69	Hassocks	1-3	Egham Town
70	Hatfield Main	0-0	Farsley Celtic
71	Haverhill Rovers	5-1	Holbeach United
72	Heanor Town	3-4	Sheffield
73	Hebburn	0-5	Dunston Federation Brewery
74	Hemel Hempstead	1-0	Ware
75	Hillingdon Borough	1-4	Stowmarket Town
76	Hoddesdon Town	0-1	Stotfold
77	Horden Colliery Welfare	0-4	Atherton Collieries
78	Horsham Y M C A	6-1	Littlehampton Town
79	Kidsgrove Athletic	0-3	Chester-Le-Street Town
80	Kimberley Town	1-1	Rossington Main
81	Knypersley Victoria	4-0	Stewart & Lloyds Corby
82	Langford	0-4	Brackley Town
83	Langney Sports	1-3	Chalfont St Peter
84	Leyton Pennant	0-0	Collier Row & Romford
85	Liversedge	0-0	Atherton Laburnum Rovers
86	Louth United	2-2	Guisborough Town
87	Lowestoft Town	1-2	Boston Town
88	Lye Town	0-4	Desborough Town
89	Maidenhead United	0-1	Havant Town
90	Mangotsfield United	6-1	Chippenham Town
91	March Town United	2-1	Barkingside
92	Margate	0-1	Banstead Athletic
93	Melksham Town	2-1	Bridgwater Town
94	Merstham	3-2	Deal Town
95	Mile Oak	5-1	Lancing
96	Murton	1-0	Congleton Town
97	Nantwich Town	5-0	South Shields
98	Netherfield	3-0	Shildon
99	Newcastle Town	1-0	Denaby United
100	Newport Pagnell Town	0-1	Wednesfield
101	North Ferriby United	4-0	Great Harwood Town
102	Northallerton	0-1	Morpeth Town
103	Northampton Spencer	1-0	Oldbury United
104	Ossett Albion	2-1	Brigg Town
105	Ossett Town	3-1	Armthorpe Welfare
106	Pagham	1-4	Northwood
107	Peacehaven & Telscombe	5-0	Dorking
108	Pontefract Collieries	1-2	Pickering Town
109	Portfield	1-3	Three Bridges
110	Portsmouth Royal Navy	1-6	Camberley Town
111	Potters Bar Town	5-1	Cheshunt
112	Prudhoe Town	1-1	Maine Road
113	Raynes Park Vale	1-4	Burnham
114	Ringmer	7-0	Steyning Town
115	Rocester	5-1	Bolehall Swifts
116	Rossendale United	1-1	Castleton Gabriels
117	Rothwell Town	5-1	Bourne Town
118	Royston Town	1-0	Southall
119	Ruislip Manor	1-1	Clacton Town
120	Rushall Olympic	1-3	Pelsall Villa
121	Ryhope Community Association	1-2	Arnold Town
122	Saffron Walden Town	2-2	Newmarket Town
123	Selsey	3-1	Thamesmead Town
124	Sheppey United	1-2	Harlow Town
125	Shifnal Town	1-2	Chadderton
126	Shoreham	0-1	Wealdstone
127	Shotton Comrades	0-4	Garforth Town
128	Soham Town Rangers	0-2	Stamford
129	Southend Manor	0-5	Braintree Town
130	Southwick	0-0	Oakwood
131	St Blazey	2-0	Minehead
132	St Helens Town	2-2	Peterlee Newtown
133	St Leonards Stamcroft	2-0	Metropolitan Police
134	Stafford Rangers	1-1	Redditch United
135	Stansted	2-1	Aveley
136	Stapenhill	3-0	Salford City
137	Stourport Swifts	0-4	Pershore Town
138	Stratford Town	0-2	Shepshed Dynamo
139	Sutton Coldfield Town	0-0	Moor Green
140	Thackley	0-4	Selby Town
141	Thatcham Town	2-0	Brockenhurst
142	Tilbury	1-1	Diss Town
143	Tiptree United	1-0	Hadleigh United
144	Tonbridge Angels	1-0	Leatherhead
145	Torrington	3-0	Paulton Rovers
146	Trafford	2-0	Clitheroe
147	Tuffley Rovers	2-5	Taunton Town
148	Uxbridge	2-1	Leighton Town
149	Viking Sports	2-0	Corinthian
150	Washington	0-0	Bridgnorth Town
151	Watton United	1-4	Bedford Town
152	Wellingborough Town	0-3	Cogenhoe United
153	Welton Rovers	3-2	Saltash United
154	Welwyn Garden City	2-0	Wootton Blue Cross
155	West Midlands Police	1-2	Westfields
156	Weston Super Mare	2-0	Brislington
157	Whitby Town	6-2	Whickham
158	Whitehawk	1-6	Whitstable Town
159	Whyteleafe	3-3	Chatham Town
160	Wick	0-2	Herne Bay
161	Willenhall Town	1-0	Hinckley Town
162	Willington	2-1	Borrowash Victoria
163	Wimborne Town	1-1	Andover
164	Wingate & Finchley	0-1	Spalding United
165	Witham Town	2-5	Grantham Town
166	Wivenhoe Town	2-2	Raunds Town
167	Wokingham Town	0-0	Fareham Town
168	Workington	1-0	Worksop Town
169	Worthing	0-1	Fisher Athletic London
170	Wroxham	2-2	Great Wakering Rovers

=== Replays ===
Tie	Home team	Score	Away team
2	Consett	2-0	Alnwick Town
11	Paget Rangers	1-2	Bedworth United
12	Leigh R M I	3-1	Belper Town
25	Great Yarmouth Town	3-1	Burnham Ramblers
28	Burscough	2-0	Cheadle Town
30	Barking	1-0	Concord Rangers
32	Chipstead	2-4	Corinthian Casuals
36	Horsham	1-0	Dartford
45	Flackwell Heath	1-1	Edgware Town
47	Kingsbury Town	0-1	Erith & Belvedere
50	Maldon Town	2-0	Fakenham Town
62	Redhill	2-1	Hailsham Town
63	Long Buckby	1-1	Halesowen Harriers
68	Blidworth Welfare	2-2	Harworth Colliery Institute
70	Farsley Celtic	2-1	Hatfield Main
80	Rossington Main	3-0	Kimberley Town
84	Collier Row & Romford	1-0	Leyton Pennant
85	Atherton Laburnum Rovers	2-2	Liversedge
86	Guisborough Town	4-1	Louth United
112	Maine Road	1-2	Prudhoe Town
116	Castleton Gabriels	2-4	Rossendale United
119	Clacton Town	3-2	Ruislip Manor
122	Newmarket Town	3-0	Saffron Walden Town
130	Oakwood	1-2	Southwick
132	Peterlee Newtown	1-2	St Helens Town
134	Redditch United	0-1	Stafford Rangers
139	Moor Green	3-2	Sutton Coldfield Town
142	Diss Town	1-0	Tilbury
150	Bridgnorth Town	2-1	Washington
159	Chatham Town	2-0	Whyteleafe
163	Andover	0-1	Wimborne Town
166	Raunds Town	3-0	Wivenhoe Town
167	Fareham Town	4-1	Wokingham Town
170	Great Wakering Rovers	0-1	Wroxham

=== 2nd replays ===
Tie	Home team	Score	Away team
45	Flackwell Heath	0-3	Edgware Town
63	Halesowen Harriers	2-1	Long Buckby
68	Blidworth Welfare	2-1	Harworth Colliery Institute
85	Atherton Laburnum Rovers	2-2	Liversedge

=== 3rd replay ===
Tie	Home team	Score	Away team
85	Liversedge	1-3	Atherton Laburnum Rovers

== 1st qualifying round ==
=== Ties ===
Tie	Home team	Score	Away team
1	Accrington Stanley	1-1	Ossett Albion
2	Aldershot Town	8-1	Merstham
3	Arlesey Town	0-3	Stevenage Borough
4	Ashton United	3-0	Harrogate Railway Athletic
5	Atherstone United	3-1	Cogenhoe United
6	Atherton Laburnum Rovers	1-0	Ilkeston Town
7	Backwell United	0-6	Yeovil Town
8	Baldock Town	2-0	Tiptree United
9	Banstead Athletic	1-3	Peacehaven & Telscombe
10	Barton Rovers	2-2	Erith & Belvedere
11	Basingstoke Town	0-3	Gloucester City
12	Bedlington Terriers	4-0	Prudhoe Town
13	Bedworth United	3-3	V S Rugby
14	Bideford	2-6	Melksham Town
15	Billericay Town	4-0	Woodbridge Town
16	Billingham Synthonia	1-0	Atherton Collieries
17	Billingham Town	2-0	Dunston Federation Brewery
18	Bishop Auckland	3-1	Pickering Town
19	Bishop's Stortford	2-0	Bedford Town
20	Blidworth Welfare	0-1	Stapenhill
21	Boreham Wood	8-1	Tring Town
22	Brackley Town	1-1	Dagenham & Redbridge
23	Bracknell Town	4-2	Selsey
24	Bradford Park Avenue	1-0	Ashfield United
25	Brandon United	0-6	Morecambe
26	Bridgnorth Town	4-1	Trafford
27	Bromley	4-0	Viking Sports
28	Buckingham Town	3-6	Hungerford Town
29	Burton Albion	1-0	Guisborough Town
30	Bury Town	0-0	Heybridge Swifts
31	Buxton	1-2	Ossett Town
32	Cambridge City	6-1	Diss Town
33	Canvey Island	3-1	Haverhill Rovers
34	Carshalton Athletic	6-0	Tunbridge Wells
35	Chatham Town	1-2	Burgess Hill Town
36	Chelmsford City	5-0	March Town United
37	Chesham United	3-1	Barking
38	Cirencester Town	2-0	Falmouth Town
39	Clevedon Town	4-1	Dorchester Town
40	Collier Row & Romford	1-1	Halstead Town
41	Corby Town	4-1	Stamford
42	Croydon	3-1	Egham Town
43	Curzon Ashton	1-0	Evenwood Town
44	Devizes Town	2-2	Bath City
45	Dulwich Hamlet	2-0	Ashford Town (Middx)
46	Durham City	5-1	Morpeth Town
47	Easington Colliery	2-7	Winsford United
48	Eastwood Town	1-0	Eccleshill United
49	Edgware Town	3-3	Ford United
50	Emley	3-0	Selby Town
51	Evesham United	4-0	Pelsall Villa
52	Fareham Town	2-1	Worcester City
53	Farsley Celtic	1-0	Knowsley United
54	Fisher Athletic London	3-2	Chalfont St Peter
55	Fleet Town	0-3	Abingdon Town
56	Flixton	2-0	Bootle
57	Forest Green Rovers	4-5	Torrington
58	Garforth Town	1-3	Whitby Town
59	Gorleston	1-2	Sudbury Town
60	Gosport Borough	0-1	Cheltenham Town
61	Grantham Town	2-0	Boston Town
62	Grays Athletic	6-0	Clacton Town
63	Gresley Rovers	2-1	Chasetown
64	Gretna	1-1	Arnold Town
65	Guiseley	4-0	Hucknall Town
66	Hampton	2-1	Harlow Town
67	Harrogate Town	0-1	Consett
68	Harrow Borough	4-1	Stowmarket Town
69	Hastings Town	2-0	Burnham
70	Havant Town	0-3	Bashley
71	Hemel Hempstead	0-1	Stansted
72	Hendon	2-0	Croydon Athletic
73	Hertford Town	1-2	Potters Bar Town
74	Hinckley Athletic	5-1	Halesowen Harriers
75	Horsham	1-0	Wealdstone
76	Horsham Y M C A	2-3	Sittingbourne
77	Leicester United scr-w/o Desborough Town		
78	Leigh R M I	2-0	Alfreton Town
79	Lincoln United	2-2	Lancaster City
80	London Colney	0-0	St Albans City
81	Maldon Town	2-7	Boston United
82	Marlow	0-2	Braintree Town
83	Matlock Town	0-1	Leek Town
84	Mile Oak	0-3	Dover Athletic
85	Molesey	3-1	Whitstable Town
86	Moor Green	1-2	Solihull Borough
87	Mossley	3-1	Burscough
88	Murton	1-3	Frickley Athletic
89	Netherfield	3-1	Nantwich Town
90	Newport A F C	5-2	Mangotsfield United
91	North Ferriby United	4-1	Chorley
92	Oldham Town	2-3	Halifax Town
93	Pershore Town	1-2	Knypersley Victoria
94	Purfleet	5-1	Hornchurch
95	Racing Club Warwick	1-1	Northampton Spencer
96	Radcliffe Borough	0-2	Marine
97	Raunds Town	2-4	East Thurrock United
98	Redhill	0-1	Crawley Town
99	Ringmer	1-2	Chertsey Town
100	Rocester	0-3	Kettering Town
101	Rossendale United	0-5	Southport
102	Rossington Main	1-2	Blakenall
103	Rothwell Town	2-3	Spalding United
104	Salisbury City	0-0	Godalming & Guildford
105	Sandwell Borough	0-0	Shepshed Dynamo
106	Sheffield	2-1	Chadderton
107	Southwick	1-2	Welling United
108	St Blazey	0-7	Merthyr Tydfil
109	St Helens Town	0-0	Gateshead
110	St Leonards Stamcroft	4-1	Arundel
111	Stafford Rangers	0-1	Bilston Town
112	Staines Town	2-0	Folkestone Invicta
113	Stocksbridge Park Steels	4-2	Chester-Le-Street Town
114	Stotfold	0-2	Hayes
115	Stourbridge	1-0	Halesowen Town
116	Sudbury Wanderers	1-1	Great Yarmouth Town
117	Tamworth	4-1	Willenhall Town
118	Thame United	1-1	A F C Lymington
119	Thatcham Town	1-1	Bemerton Heath Harlequins
120	Three Bridges	1-6	Farnborough Town
121	Tiverton Town	3-0	Frome Town
122	Tonbridge Angels	2-0	Northwood
123	Tooting & Mitcham United	5-0	Corinthian Casuals
124	Tow Law Town	1-1	Gainsborough Trinity
125	Trowbridge Town	3-0	Calne Town
126	Uxbridge	5-1	Clapton
127	Walton & Hersham	1-1	Herne Bay
128	Warrington Town	0-1	Hyde United
129	Wednesfield	0-0	Hednesford Town
130	Welton Rovers	0-6	Taunton Town
131	Welwyn Garden City	1-4	Aylesbury United
132	Wembley	0-2	Royston Town
133	West Auckland Town	1-3	Bamber Bridge
134	Westfields	0-4	Rushden & Diamonds
135	Weston Super Mare	4-0	Bristol Manor Farm
136	Weymouth	2-0	Camberley Town
137	Willington	1-3	Newcastle Town
138	Wimborne Town	5-0	Cove
139	Wisbech Town	2-1	Newmarket Town
140	Witney Town	1-1	Oxford City
141	Workington	3-1	Crook Town
142	Wroxham	3-2	King's Lynn
143	Yeading	6-0	Bowers United
144	Yorkshire Amateur	0-1	Stalybridge Celtic

=== Replays ===
Tie	Home team	Score	Away team
1	Ossett Albion	2-1	Accrington Stanley
10	Erith & Belvedere	1-2	Barton Rovers
13	V S Rugby	0-3	Bedworth United
22	Dagenham & Redbridge	1-0	Brackley Town
30	Heybridge Swifts	3-0	Bury Town
40	Halstead Town	4-0	Collier Row & Romford
44	Bath City	3-1	Devizes Town
49	Ford United	2-3	Edgware Town
64	Arnold Town	3-0	Gretna
79	Lancaster City	3-2	Lincoln United
80	St Albans City	4-1	London Colney
95	Northampton Spencer	2-2	Racing Club Warwick
104	Godalming & Guildford	0-2	Salisbury City
105	Shepshed Dynamo	5-2	Sandwell Borough
109	Gateshead	5-1	St Helens Town
116	Great Yarmouth Town	0-1	Sudbury Wanderers
118	A F C Lymington	1-1	Thame United
119	Bemerton Heath Harlequins	2-3	Thatcham Town
124	Gainsborough Trinity	2-0	Tow Law Town
127	Herne Bay	1-0	Walton & Hersham
129	Hednesford Town	6-0	Wednesfield
140	Oxford City	2-3	Witney Town

=== 2nd replays ===
Tie	Home team	Score	Away team
95	Racing Club Warwick	5-1	Northampton Spencer
118	Thame United	3-1	A F C Lymington

== 2nd qualifying round ==
=== Ties ===
Tie	Home team	Score	Away team
1	Arnold Town	0-0	Flixton
2	Ashton United	2-0	Netherfield
3	Atherton Laburnum Rovers	3-2	Curzon Ashton
4	Aylesbury United	0-3	Boreham Wood
5	Bamber Bridge	5-3	Stapenhill
6	Barton Rovers	1-2	Edgware Town
7	Bashley	4-3	Thame United
8	Bath City	5-2	Newport A F C
9	Billericay Town	0-0	Corby Town
10	Billingham Town	0-1	Workington
11	Boston United	3-0	Bishop's Stortford
12	Bracknell Town	5-2	Peacehaven & Telscombe
13	Braintree Town	3-1	Halstead Town
14	Burton Albion	2-1	Stocksbridge Park Steels
15	Canvey Island	1-1	Grantham Town
16	Cheltenham Town	4-3	Salisbury City
17	Chertsey Town	2-3	Hastings Town
18	Clevedon Town	0-2	Tiverton Town
19	Crawley Town	0-4	Bromley
20	Croydon	0-7	St Leonards Stamcroft
21	Dagenham & Redbridge	0-0	Harrow Borough
22	Desborough Town	2-2	Bilston Town
23	Dover Athletic	2-0	Aldershot Town
24	Durham City	1-1	Consett (Tie awarded to Consett)
25	Fareham Town	4-2	Hungerford Town
26	Farnborough Town	3-2	Carshalton Athletic
27	Farsley Celtic	3-1	Mossley
28	Frickley Athletic	1-0	Bradford Park Avenue
29	Gainsborough Trinity	2-1	Bridgnorth Town
30	Gateshead	5-1	Ossett Town
31	Gloucester City	1-3	Thatcham Town
32	Halifax Town	1-4	Bishop Auckland
33	Hampton	2-2	Stansted
34	Hayes	1-1	Grays Athletic
35	Hednesford Town	6-1	Evesham United
36	Hendon	0-0	Fisher Athletic London
37	Herne Bay	1-0	Horsham
38	Heybridge Swifts	1-1	Chelmsford City
39	Hinckley Athletic	1-1	Bedworth United
40	Hyde United	0-1	Whitby Town
41	Kettering Town	0-0	Atherstone United
42	Lancaster City	6-0	Blakenall
43	Leek Town	1-0	Eastwood Town
44	Leigh R M I	1-1	Billingham Synthonia
45	Marine	1-0	Sheffield
46	Melksham Town	0-1	Cirencester Town
47	Merthyr Tydfil	3-1	Torrington
48	Molesey	0-0	Tonbridge Angels
49	Morecambe	4-1	Guiseley
50	North Ferriby United	1-0	Bedlington Terriers
51	Potters Bar Town	0-4	Chesham United
52	Racing Club Warwick	0-5	Tamworth
53	Royston Town	0-5	Uxbridge
54	Rushden & Diamonds	4-0	Gresley Rovers
55	Sittingbourne	4-5	Tooting & Mitcham United
56	Solihull Borough	1-1	Shepshed Dynamo
57	Southport	1-1	Emley
58	St Albans City	1-1	Yeading
59	Staines Town	2-1	Burgess Hill Town
60	Stalybridge Celtic	4-1	Ossett Albion
61	Stevenage Borough	1-1	Baldock Town
62	Stourbridge	0-0	Knypersley Victoria
63	Sudbury Town	2-1	Purfleet
64	Sudbury Wanderers	3-2	Spalding United
65	Trowbridge Town	2-1	Weston Super Mare
66	Welling United	2-1	Dulwich Hamlet
67	Weymouth	1-0	Abingdon Town
68	Winsford United	0-1	Newcastle Town
69	Wisbech Town	2-0	East Thurrock United
70	Witney Town	2-1	Wimborne Town
71	Wroxham	1-1	Cambridge City
72	Yeovil Town	0-0	Taunton Town

=== Replays ===
Tie	Home team	Score	Away team
1	Flixton	2-0	Arnold Town
9	Corby Town	1-1	Billericay Town
15	Grantham Town	0-1	Canvey Island
21	Harrow Borough	0-2	Dagenham & Redbridge
22	Bilston Town	5-2	Desborough Town
33	Stansted	2-1	Hampton
34	Grays Athletic	0-0	Hayes
36	Fisher Athletic London	0-1	Hendon
38	Chelmsford City	2-1	Heybridge Swifts
39	Bedworth United	3-1	Hinckley Athletic
41	Atherstone United	1-6	Kettering Town
44	Billingham Synthonia	2-3	Leigh R M I
48	Tonbridge Angels	1-2	Molesey
56	Shepshed Dynamo	1-0	Solihull Borough
57	Emley	2-3	Southport
58	Yeading	0-1	St Albans City
61	Baldock Town	1-2	Stevenage Borough
62	Knypersley Victoria	1-0	Stourbridge
71	Cambridge City	2-0	Wroxham
72	Taunton Town	3-5	Yeovil Town

=== 2nd replays ===
Tie	Home team	Score	Away team
9	Corby Town	3-1	Billericay Town
34	Hayes	2-0	Grays Athletic

== 3rd qualifying round ==
=== Ties ===
Tie	Home team	Score	Away team
1	Atherton Laburnum Rovers	1-1	Bamber Bridge
2	Bashley	0-1	Thatcham Town
3	Bath City	2-0	Cirencester Town
4	Bishop Auckland	0-1	Consett
5	Boreham Wood	3-2	Edgware Town
6	Boston United	10-1	Sudbury Wanderers
7	Bromley	1-1	St Leonards Stamcroft
8	Cambridge City	0-3	Canvey Island
9	Chelmsford City	2-3	Wisbech Town
10	Cheltenham Town	1-0	Weymouth
11	Dagenham & Redbridge	3-0	Uxbridge
12	Dover Athletic	0-1	Hendon
13	Fareham Town	0-1	Witney Town
14	Farnborough Town	3-2	Bracknell Town
15	Farsley Celtic	0-1	Whitby Town
16	Frickley Athletic	1-1	Newcastle Town
17	Gateshead	4-0	Workington
18	Hastings Town	2-1	Molesey
19	Hayes	1-0	Chesham United
20	Hednesford Town	4-2	Tamworth
21	Kettering Town	0-1	Bedworth United
22	Leek Town	2-0	Gainsborough Trinity
23	Leigh R M I	2-0	Marine
24	Merthyr Tydfil	1-0	Trowbridge Town
25	Morecambe	6-2	Flixton
26	North Ferriby United	0-2	Lancaster City
27	Rushden & Diamonds	1-0	Bilston Town
28	Shepshed Dynamo	1-0	Knypersley Victoria
29	Southport	4-1	Burton Albion
30	St Albans City	5-0	Stansted
31	Stalybridge Celtic	2-1	Ashton United
32	Stevenage Borough	3-1	Braintree Town
33	Sudbury Town	1-0	Corby Town
34	Tiverton Town	0-2	Yeovil Town
35	Tooting & Mitcham United	0-1	Staines Town
36	Welling United	2-0	Herne Bay

=== Replays ===
Tie	Home team	Score	Away team
1	Bamber Bridge	2-0	Atherton Laburnum Rovers
7	St Leonards Stamcroft	2-5	Bromley
16	Newcastle Town	2-1	Frickley Athletic

== 4th qualifying round ==
The teams that given byes to this round are Kidderminster Harriers, Bromsgrove Rovers, Altrincham, Telford United, Slough Town, Runcorn, Witton Albion, Sutton United, Nuneaton Borough, Hitchin Town, Kingstonian, Gravesend & Northfleet, Ashford Town (Kent), Barrow, Blyth Spartans, Spennymoor United, Colwyn Bay, Newport I O W, Cinderford Town and Bognor Regis Town.

=== Ties ===
Tie	Home team	Score	Away team
1	Ashford Town (Kent)	3-1	Kingstonian
2	Barrow	1-1	Altrincham
3	Bath City	0-0	Cheltenham Town
4	Bedworth United	0-2	Boston United
5	Boreham Wood	5-0	Thatcham Town
6	Bromley	1-0	Sutton United
7	Canvey Island	0-1	Sudbury Town
8	Cinderford Town	0-4	Farnborough Town
9	Colwyn Bay	1-0	Nuneaton Borough
10	Gateshead	0-1	Consett
11	Gravesend & Northfleet	1-5	Stevenage Borough
12	Hastings Town	1-1	Hendon
13	Hayes	1-0	Slough Town
14	Hednesford Town	2-0	Telford United
15	Hitchin Town	1-2	Wisbech Town
16	Lancaster City	1-1	Morecambe
17	Leigh R M I	2-4	Runcorn
18	Merthyr Tydfil	2-1	Yeovil Town
19	Newcastle Town	4-0	Bamber Bridge
20	Newport I O W	1-4	Dagenham & Redbridge
21	Rushden & Diamonds	2-0	Bognor Regis Town
22	Shepshed Dynamo	2-0	Bromsgrove Rovers
23	Spennymoor United	2-2	Southport
24	Staines Town	0-1	Welling United
25	Stalybridge Celtic	1-0	Leek Town
26	Whitby Town	2-1	Blyth Spartans
27	Witney Town	0-4	St Albans City
28	Witton Albion	1-4	Kidderminster Harriers

=== Replays ===
Tie	Home team	Score	Away team
2	Altrincham	4-0	Barrow
3	Cheltenham Town	4-1	Bath City
12	Hendon	2-0	Hastings Town
16	Morecambe	2-2	Lancaster City
23	Southport	2-1	Spennymoor United

=== 2nd replays ===
Tie	Home team	Score	Away team
16	Morecambe	4-2	Lancaster City

== 1996-97 FA Cup ==
See 1996-97 FA Cup for details of the rounds from the first round proper onwards.
