= 1957–58 FA Cup qualifying rounds =

Tournament details
- Country: England; Wales

The FA Cup 1957–58 is the 77th season of the world's oldest football knockout competition; The Football Association Challenge Cup, or FA Cup for short. The large number of clubs entering the tournament from lower down the English football league system meant that the competition started with a number of preliminary and qualify]ing rounds. The 30 victorious teams from the fourth round qualifying progressed to the first round proper.

== Preliminary round ==
=== Ties ===
Tie	Home team	Score	Away team
1	Abingdon Town	1–0	Maidenhead United
2	Ashton United	3–1	Skelmersdale United
3	Bacup Borough	3–0	Lytham
4	Betteshanger Colliery Welfare	2–0	Snowdown Colliery Welfare
5	Bexleyheath & Welling	1–0	Tonbridge
6	Bilston	2–0	Darlaston
7	Brentwood & Warley	0–0	Harwich & Parkeston
8	Bromley	4–2	Epsom
9	Chatteris Town	1–1	Ely City
10	Chelmsford City	3–0	Briggs Sports
11	Congleton Town	2–0	Stalybridge Celtic
12	Deal Town	1–1	Dartford
13	Dorking	1–1	Sutton United
14	Dover	2–1	Folkestone
15	Dulwich Hamlet	8–0	Metropolitan Police
16	Earlestown	1–6	Prescot Cables
17	Eastbourne United	1–1	Horsham
18	Ellesmere Port Town	3–0	Stockton Heath
19	Enfield	3–0	Cheshunt
20	Erith & Belvedere	1–3	Tunbridge Wells United
21	Eton Manor	3–1	Hertford Town
22	Finchley	3–3	Hayes
23	Gravesend & Northfleet	3–1	Ashford Town (Kent)
24	Grays Athletic	2–1	Dagenham
25	Haverhill Rovers	6–1	Diss Town
26	Headington United	3–0	Aylesbury United
27	Histon	1–2	Cambridge City
28	Hoddesdon Town	2–2	St Albans City
29	Hornchurch & Upminster	1–1	Leytonstone
30	Horwich R M I	1–1	Mossley
31	Hounslow Town	2–0	Harrow Town
32	Huntley & Palmers	4–2	Windsor & Eton
33	Ilfracombe Town	1–7	Barnstaple Town
34	Kidderminster Harriers	0–2	Wellington Town
35	King's Lynn	2–1	Holbeach United
36	Kingstonian	3–5	Woking
37	Letchworth Town	2–1	Barnet
38	Leyland Motors	2–2	Cromptons Recreation
39	Leyton	5–0	Woodford Town
40	Littlehampton Town	3–1	Bexhill Town
41	Lockheed Leamington	1–4	Brierley Hill Alliance
42	Lostock Gralam	3–4	Altrincham
43	Lovells Athletic	3–2	Merthyr Tydfil
44	Lye Town	6–0	Dudley Town
45	Macclesfield	5–4	Winsford United
46	Maidstone United	1–3	Whitstable
47	March Town United	3–1	Thetford Town
48	Moor Green	0–1	Boldmere St Michaels
49	Newhaven	2–1	Eastbourne
50	Newquay	2–0	St Austell
51	Northwich Victoria	4–2	Buxton
52	Rainham Town	2–1	Aveley
53	Ramsgate Athletic	5–1	Chatham Town
54	Romford	1–1	Clacton Town
55	Runcorn	3–0	Pwllheli & District
56	Salisbury	4–2	Westbury United
57	Shefford Town	2–8	Clapton
58	Sheppey United	2–5	Sittingbourne
59	Slough Town	5–2	Witney Town
60	Soham Town Rangers	4–2	Warboys Town
61	Southall	4–0	Edgware Town
62	St Neots Town	6–0	Somersham Town
63	Stork	3–2	South Liverpool
64	Sutton Coldfield Town	2–2	Nuneaton Borough
65	Tamworth	1–2	Oswestry Town
66	Tavistock	4–3	St Blazey
67	Tilbury	0–0	Ilford
68	Tufnell Park Edmonton	2–1	Bishop's Stortford
69	Ware	3–1	Hitchin Town
70	Wealdstone	0–5	Hendon
71	Wembley	3–0	Berkhamsted Town
72	Wimbledon	1–3	Walton & Hersham
73	Wisbech Town	6–0	Newmarket Town
74	Worcester City	4–1	Hednesford Town
75	Worthing	1–1	Haywards Heath

=== Replays ===
Tie	Home team	Score	Away team
7	Harwich & Parkeston	1–1	Brentwood & Warley
9	Ely City	0–1	Chatteris Town
12	Dartford	2–1	Deal Town
13	Sutton United	5–0	Dorking
17	Horsham	2–0	Eastbourne United
22	Hayes	0–1	Finchley
28	St Albans City	4–1	Hoddesdon Town
29	Leytonstone	3–3	Hornchurch & Upminster
30	Mossley	2–1	Horwich R M I
38	Cromptons Recreation	5–1	Leyland Motors
54	Clacton Town	2–2	Romford
64	Nuneaton Borough	3–1	Sutton Coldfield Town
67	Ilford	2–1	Tilbury
75	Haywards Heath	3–3	Worthing

=== 2nd replays ===
Tie	Home team	Score	Away team
7	Brentwood & Warley	2–0	Harwich & Parkeston
29	Leytonstone	0–2	Hornchurch & Upminster
54	Romford	2–4	Clacton Town
75	Worthing	7–1	Haywards Heath

== 1st qualifying round ==
=== Ties ===
Tie	Home team	Score	Away team
1	Alford United	1–0	Bourne Town
2	Alnwick Town	8–3	South Bank
3	Altrincham	4–3	Macclesfield
4	Andover	2–3	Chichester City
5	Ashby Institute	2–5	Brigg Town
6	Bacup Borough	1–1	Mossley
7	Barnstaple Town	5–1	Minehead
8	Basingstoke Town	4–2	Alton Town
9	Bath City	5–0	Weston Super Mare
10	Bedworth Town	2–1	Atherstone Town
11	Belper Town	3–1	Clay Cross & Danesmoor Welfare
12	Betteshanger Colliery Welfare	1–0	Ramsgate Athletic
13	Boldon Colliery Welfare	4–2	Blackhall Colliery Welfare
14	Brierley Hill Alliance	3–2	Halesowen Town
15	Brush Sports	0–1	Hinckley Athletic
16	Bungay Town	0–2	Great Yarmouth Town
17	Burscough	4–3	Fleetwood
18	Bury Town	8–1	Leiston
19	Calne & Harris United	1–2	Warminster Town
20	Cambridge City	1–6	King's Lynn
21	Cambridge United	6–2	St Neots Town
22	Chatteris Town	0–5	Wisbech Town
23	Chelmsford City	4–0	Clacton Town
24	Cheltenham Town	0–0	Lovells Athletic
25	Chesham United	5–1	Abingdon Town
26	Chorley	5–1	Nelson
27	Cinderford Town	2–1	Gloucester City
28	Clandown	2–4	Clevedon
29	Clapton	3–1	St Albans City
30	Clitheroe	4–0	Milnthorpe Corinthians
31	Cockfield	5–0	Cramlington Welfare
32	Corby Town	2–1	Rothwell Town
33	Cowes	0–0	Winchester City
34	Cromptons Recreation	2–1	Darwen
35	Crook Town	4–3	Consett
36	Devizes Town	1–5	Chippenham Town
37	Dover	1–3	Dartford
38	Dulwich Hamlet	4–0	Carshalton Athletic
39	Durham City	8–3	Gosforth & Coxlodge
40	Easington Colliery Welfare	11–2	Wolsingham Welfare
41	Ebbw Vale	5–5	Llanelli
42	Ellesmere Port Town	5–0	Hyde United
43	Enfield	2–0	Eton Manor
44	Eynesbury Rovers	1–3	Dunstable Town
45	Finchley	4–0	Hendon
46	Flint Town United	1–1	Bangor City
47	Gainsborough Trinity	4–2	Louth United
48	Glastonbury	5–0	Street
49	Gravesend & Northfleet	3–1	Sittingbourne
50	Haverhill Rovers	2–4	Lowestoft Town
51	Headington United	1–0	Banbury Spencer
52	Hemel Hempstead	1–2	Hounslow Town
53	Hornchurch & Upminster	1–1	Leyton
54	Horsham	1–2	Redhill
55	Ilford	4–3	Grays Athletic
56	Kettering Town	4–1	Stamford
57	Lancaster City	1–2	Morecambe
58	Letchworth Town	1–1	Tufnell Park Edmonton
59	Linotype & Machinery	3–6	Northwich Victoria
60	Littlehampton Town	3–3	Bognor Regis Town
61	Lye Town	4–2	Boldmere St Michaels
62	March Town United	4–2	Soham Town Rangers
63	Marine	0–1	Stork
64	Marlow	4–1	Huntley & Palmers
65	Matlock Town	2–3	Gresley Rovers
66	Melksham Town	0–0	Frome Town
67	Netherfield	5–2	Penrith
68	Newhaven	1–0	Lancing Athletic
69	North Shields	4–1	Annfield Plain
70	Nuneaton Borough	2–0	Bilston
71	Oswestry Town	3–0	Stafford Rangers
72	Rainham Town	2–0	Brentwood & Warley
73	Ransome & Marles	2–1	Worksop Town
74	Rossendale United	2–2	Ashton United
75	Runcorn	0–1	Prescot Cables
76	Rushden Town	2–2	Spalding United
77	Salisbury	0–3	Trowbridge Town
78	Shotton Colliery Welfare	0–3	Shildon
79	Skegness Town	1–1	Grantham
80	Slough Town	1–2	Oxford City
81	South Normanton Miners Welfare	2–2	Ilkeston Town
82	Southwick	3–2	Worthing
83	Spennymoor United	2–2	Ferryhill Athletic
84	St Helens Town	3–5	Llandudno
85	Stanley United	3–1	Chilton Athletic
86	Stonehouse	0–2	Barry Town
87	Stourbridge	3–1	Bourneville Athletic
88	Sudbury Town	1–3	Stowmarket
89	Tavistock	1–3	Penzance
90	Tow Law Town	2–2	Whitby Town
91	Truro City	3–1	Newquay
92	Tunbridge Wells United	1–4	Bexleyheath & Welling
93	Uxbridge	1–2	Southall
94	Wadebridge Town	0–2	Bideford
95	Walton & Hersham	3–3	Sutton United
96	Ware	3–0	Stevenage Town
97	Wellington Town	7–1	Cradley Heath
98	Wells City	2–1	Chippenham United
99	Wembley	0–1	Yiewsley
100	West Auckland Town	1–2	Whitley Bay
101	Whitstable	2–2	Canterbury City
102	Whitton United	2–0	Long Melford
103	Willington	1–0	Stockton
104	Witton Albion	4–0	Congleton Town
105	Woking	1–5	Bromley
106	Worcester City	1–1	Rugby Town

=== Replays ===
Tie	Home team	Score	Away team
6	Mossley	3–1	Bacup Borough
24	Lovells Athletic	0–0	Cheltenham Town
33	Winchester City	0–1	Cowes
41	Llanelli	3–2	Ebbw Vale
46	Bangor City	5–1	Flint Town United
53	Leyton	4–1	Hornchurch & Upminster
58	Tufnell Park Edmonton	0–1	Letchworth Town
60	Bognor Regis Town	5–4	Littlehampton Town
66	Frome Town	2–3	Melksham Town
74	Ashton United	1–0	Rossendale United
76	Spalding United	8–0	Rushden Town
79	Grantham	2–0	Skegness Town
81	Ilkeston Town	2–0	South Normanton Miners Welfare
83	Ferryhill Athletic	4–2	Spennymoor United
90	Whitby Town	5–1	Tow Law Town
95	Sutton United	0–4	Walton & Hersham
101	Canterbury City	1–5	Whitstable
106	Rugby Town	0–2	Worcester City

=== 2nd replay ===
Tie	Home team	Score	Away team
24	Cheltenham Town	2–4	Lovells Athletic

== 2nd qualifying round ==
=== Ties ===
Tie	Home team	Score	Away team
1	Alford United	2–1	Gainsborough Trinity
2	Altrincham	2–0	Ellesmere Port Town
3	Ashton United	4–1	Cromptons Recreation
4	Barry Town	3–0	Cinderford Town
5	Basingstoke Town	2–5	Cowes
6	Bedworth Town	1–1	Worcester City
7	Beighton Miners Welfare	1–2	Norton Woodseats
8	Bexleyheath & Welling	3–1	Dulwich Hamlet
9	Bideford	5–1	Penzance
10	Bognor Regis Town	5–1	Newhaven
11	Boots Athletic	1–3	Gresley Rovers
12	Bridlington Central United	0–3	Shildon
13	Brierley Hill Alliance	4–2	Nuneaton Borough
14	Brigg Town	1–1	Grantham
15	Bury Town	2–1	Lowestoft Town
16	Chelmsford City	5–0	Leyton
17	Chesham United	2–2	Marlow
18	Chichester City	5–3	Gosport Borough Athletic
19	Chippenham Town	1–1	Trowbridge Town
20	Clevedon	1–1	Bath City
21	Cockfield	2–5	Evenwood Town
22	Corby Town	3–1	Kettering Town
23	Dartford	0–1	Gravesend & Northfleet
24	Denaby United	5–1	Upton Colliery
25	Dunstable Town	1–6	Vauxhall Motors
26	Easington Colliery Welfare	2–1	Boldon Colliery Welfare
27	Enfield	2–3	Clapton
28	Frickley Colliery	1–0	Retford Town
29	Glastonbury	3–0	Wells City
30	Gorleston	3–0	Sheringham
31	Great Yarmouth Town	4–0	Beccles
32	Hallam	5–2	Sheffield
33	Hinckley Athletic	4–4	Long Eaton United
34	Horden Colliery Welfare	3–1	Ferryhill Athletic
35	Hounslow Town	0–0	Southall
36	Ilkeston Town	2–4	Belper Town
37	Ilminster Town	1–2	Bridport
38	King's Lynn	2–2	Wisbech Town
39	Llanelli	4–2	Lovells Athletic
40	Lye Town	1–4	Oswestry Town
41	March Town United	4–1	Cambridge United
42	Melksham Town	7–2	Warminster Town
43	Morecambe	1–0	Clitheroe
44	Morpeth Town	1–2	Durham City
45	Mossley	1–4	Chorley
46	Netherfield	0–2	Burscough
47	Newburn	0–2	Alnwick Town
48	North Shields	0–0	Ashington
49	Oxford City	0–2	Headington United
50	Players Athletic	0–5	Heanor Town
51	Portland United	3–1	Poole Town
52	Prescot Cables	4–2	Bangor City
53	Rainham Town	4–3	Ilford
54	Ransome & Marles	3–4	Creswell Colliery
55	Redhill	3–0	Southwick
56	Shirebrook Miners Welfare	2–3	Sutton Town
57	Stocksbridge Works	1–1	Ossett Town
58	Stork	1–1	Llandudno
59	Stourbridge	2–3	Wellington Town
60	Truro City	2–5	Barnstaple Town
61	Walton & Hersham	1–0	Bromley
62	Ware	3–0	Letchworth Town
63	Wellingborough Town	1–1	Spalding United
64	Whitley Bay	0–5	Crook Town
65	Whitstable	2–0	Betteshanger Colliery Welfare
66	Whitton United	2–4	Stowmarket
67	Willington	5–2	Whitby Town
68	Wingate Welfare	2–11	Stanley United
69	Witton Albion	3–2	Northwich Victoria
70	Wolverton Town & B R	7–0	Biggleswade & District
71	Yiewsley	4–1	Finchley
72	Yorkshire Amateur	1–1	Farsley Celtic

=== Replays ===
Tie	Home team	Score	Away team
6	Worcester City	3–0	Bedworth Town
14	Grantham	2–0	Brigg Town
17	Marlow	5–1	Chesham United
19	Trowbridge Town	3–0	Chippenham Town
20	Bath City	4–1	Clevedon
33	Long Eaton United	1–9	Hinckley Athletic
35	Southall	0–2	Hounslow Town
38	Wisbech Town	4–1	King's Lynn
48	Ashington	3–1	North Shields
57	Ossett Town	3–4	Stocksbridge Works
58	Llandudno	0–2	Stork
63	Spalding United	4–1	Wellingborough Town
72	Farsley Celtic	1–2	Yorkshire Amateur

== 3rd qualifying round ==
=== Ties ===
Tie	Home team	Score	Away team
1	Alford United	1–0	Grantham
2	Ashton United	2–3	Chorley
3	Barnstaple Town	2–3	Bideford
4	Bath City	2–1	Glastonbury
5	Belper Town	2–1	Gresley Rovers
6	Bognor Regis Town	0–3	Redhill
7	Chelmsford City	6–0	Rainham Town
8	Clapton	2–0	Ware
9	Cowes	3–1	Chichester City
10	Crook Town	1–1	Stanley United
11	Easington Colliery Welfare	6–4	Alnwick Town
12	Evenwood Town	1–2	Durham City
13	Frickley Colliery	2–1	Denaby United
14	Gorleston	3–2	Great Yarmouth Town
15	Headington United	1–0	Marlow
16	Heanor Town	3–1	Hinckley Athletic
17	Horden Colliery Welfare	3–1	Ashington
18	Hounslow Town	3–1	Yiewsley
19	Llanelli	1–1	Barry Town
20	March Town United	1–1	Wisbech Town
21	Melksham Town	0–6	Trowbridge Town
22	Morecambe	6–2	Burscough
23	Norton Woodseats	4–0	Hallam
24	Oswestry Town	2–2	Wellington Town
25	Portland United	2–1	Bridport
26	Shildon	1–2	Willington
27	Spalding United	4–0	Corby Town
28	Stocksbridge Works	2–3	Yorkshire Amateur
29	Stork	1–3	Prescot Cables
30	Stowmarket	2–3	Bury Town
31	Sutton Town	2–1	Creswell Colliery
32	Walton & Hersham	3–1	Bexleyheath & Welling
33	Whitstable	0–3	Gravesend & Northfleet
34	Witton Albion	3–2	Altrincham
35	Wolverton Town & B R	2–1	Vauxhall Motors
36	Worcester City	4–0	Brierley Hill Alliance

=== Replays ===
Tie	Home team	Score	Away team
10	Stanley United	0–4	Crook Town
19	Barry Town	1–0	Llanelli
20	Wisbech Town	2–1	March Town United
24	Wellington Town	0–1	Oswestry Town

== 4th qualifying round ==
The teams that given byes to this round are Bedford Town, Peterborough United, Wigan Athletic, Burton Albion, Yeovil Town, Walthamstow Avenue, Weymouth, Rhyl, Hereford United, Blyth Spartans, Hastings United, Guildford City, Selby Town, Newport I O W, Boston United, Scarborough, Dorchester Town, Goole Town, South Shields, Tooting & Mitcham United, Billingham Synthonia, New Brighton, Bromsgrove Rovers and Margate.

=== Ties ===
Tie	Home team	Score	Away team
1	Barry Town	1–2	Bath City
2	Bedford Town	1–1	Walthamstow Avenue
3	Boston United	4–0	Alford United
4	Bromsgrove Rovers	3–3	Worcester City
5	Chorley	1–2	Wigan Athletic
6	Clapton	3–2	Bury Town
7	Cowes	2–2	Trowbridge Town
8	Crook Town	3–0	Blyth Spartans
9	Durham City	2–0	Willington
10	Easington Colliery Welfare	2–3	Billingham Synthonia
11	Gorleston	1–0	Chelmsford City
12	Guildford City	1–1	Gravesend & Northfleet
13	Headington United	0–2	Margate
14	Heanor Town	1–5	Hereford United
15	Hounslow Town	2–3	Wisbech Town
16	New Brighton	2–3	Rhyl
17	Newport I O W	5–0	Portland United
18	Norton Woodseats	0–0	Witton Albion
19	Oswestry Town	5–1	Burton Albion
20	Peterborough United	7–0	Wolverton Town & B R
21	Prescot Cables	3–0	Morecambe
22	Scarborough	2–2	Selby Town
23	South Shields	4–2	Horden Colliery Welfare
24	Spalding United	2–1	Belper Town
25	Sutton Town	0–1	Frickley Colliery
26	Tooting & Mitcham United	1–3	Redhill
27	Walton & Hersham	3–1	Hastings United
28	Weymouth	2–2	Dorchester Town
29	Yeovil Town	3–1	Bideford
30	Yorkshire Amateur	1–2	Goole Town

=== Replays ===
Tie	Home team	Score	Away team
2	Walthamstow Avenue	1–0	Bedford Town
4	Worcester City	2–1	Bromsgrove Rovers
7	Trowbridge Town	4–1	Cowes
12	Gravesend & Northfleet	0–1	Guildford City
18	Witton Albion	6–1	Norton Woodseats
22	Selby Town	2–2	Scarborough
28	Dorchester Town	2–1	Weymouth

=== 2nd replay ===
Tie	Home team	Score	Away team
22	Scarborough	1–0	Selby Town

== 1957–58 FA Cup ==
See 1957-58 FA Cup for details of the rounds from the first round proper onwards.
