= 1952–53 FA Cup qualifying rounds =

Tournament details
- Country: England; Wales

The FA Cup 1952–53 is the 72nd season of the world's oldest football knockout competition; The Football Association Challenge Cup, or FA Cup for short. The large number of clubs entering the tournament from lower down the English football league system meant that the competition started with a number of preliminary and qualifying rounds. The 30 victorious teams from the fourth round qualifying progressed to the first round proper.

== Preliminary round ==
=== Ties ===
Tie	Home team	Score	Away team
1	Andover	2–3	Frome Town
2	Ashby Institute	2–3	Brigg Town
3	Aylesbury United	4–1	Chesham United
4	Banbury Spencer	1–1	Maidenhead United
5	Barking	1–1	Ilford
6	Barnstaple Town	5–1	Dartmouth United
7	Berkhamsted Town	1–5	Barnet
8	Betteshanger Colliery Welfare	2–0	Deal Town
9	Bexhill Town	2–0	Shoreham
10	Bexleyheath & Welling	1–5	Carshalton Athletic
11	Blandford United	2–5	Dorchester Town
12	Boldmere St Michaels	2–2	Rugby Town
13	Boston United	7–1	Barton Town
14	Brentwood & Warley	1–3	Dagenham
15	Calne & Harris United	0–4	Trowbridge Town
16	Chatham Town	0–6	Dover
17	Chatteris Town	0–4	Cambridge United
18	Clandown	0–4	Glastonbury
19	Corsham Town	1–4	Chippenham Town
20	Darlaston	2–1	Stourbridge
21	Dunstable Town	2–4	Hitchin Town
22	Earlestown	0–2	Prescot Cables
23	East Grinstead	4–2	Redhill
24	Enfield	3–3	Woodford Town
25	Epsom	2–2	Dulwich Hamlet
26	Gloucester City	1–1	Llanelli
27	Halesowen Town	1–4	Brierley Hill Alliance
28	Hanham Athletic	0–1	Paulton Rovers
29	Harrow Town	1–8	Uxbridge
30	Hastings United	4–0	Chichester City
31	Hayes	6–1	Yiewsley
32	Haywards Heath	2–2	Southwick
33	Horsham	1–4	Worthing
34	Huntley & Palmers	4–2	Witney Town
35	Kidderminster Harriers	4–0	Dudley Town
36	Kingstonian	5–0	Erith & Belvedere
37	Lancing Athletic	6–6	Eastbourne
38	Leyland Motors	0–3	Horwich R M I
39	Littlehampton Town	4–3	Bognor Regis Town
40	Llandudno	1–1	Bootle Athletic
41	Lockheed Leamington	1–2	Nuneaton Borough
42	Lytham	2–0	Droylsden
43	Maidstone United	0–6	Bromley
44	Margate	1–4	Gravesend & Northfleet
45	Marine	3–3	Ellesmere Port Town
46	Marlow	0–8	Headington United
47	Melksham Town	0–2	Warminster Town
48	Metropolitan Police	1–5	Wimbledon
49	Minehead	1–4	Bideford
50	Moor Green	1–1	Burton Albion
51	Newhaven	2–4	Ashford Town (Kent)
52	Newquay	7–1	Truro City
53	Newton Abbot	1–1	Ilfracombe Town
54	Oxford City	1–4	Wycombe Wanderers
55	Parliament Street Methodists	0–6	Linby Colliery
56	Peasedown Miners Welfare	6–2	Clevedon
57	Penrith	4–4	Burscough
58	Raleigh Athletic	1–4	Ransome & Marles
59	Ramsgate Athletic	4–2	Snowdown Colliery Welfare
60	Retford Town	2–1	Holbeach United
61	Runcorn	2–2	Bangor City
62	Rushden Town	3–1	Wellingborough Town
63	Salisbury	7–1	Welton Rovers
64	Sheppey United	5–1	Bowater Lloyds
65	Sittingbourne	3–1	Faversham Town
66	Slough Centre	2–1	Slough Town
67	Southall	1–3	Edgware Town
68	St Blazey	3–1	Penzance
69	Stafford Rangers	0–1	Bilston
70	Street	2–0	Bristol St George
71	Tamworth	0–2	Hednesford Town
72	Tavistock	1–2	Bridgwater Town
73	Tiverton Town	1–2	Taunton
74	Tunbridge Wells United	2–1	Canterbury City
75	Wadebridge Town	4–5	St Austell
76	Walton & Hersham	0–1	Tooting & Mitcham United
77	Windsor & Eton	0–4	Wealdstone
78	Woking	4–1	Dorking

=== Replays ===
Tie	Home team	Score	Away team
4	Maidenhead United	3–0	Banbury Spencer
5	Ilford	4–2	Barking
12	Rugby Town	2–1	Boldmere St Michaels
24	Woodford Town	4–2	Enfield
25	Dulwich Hamlet	4–2	Epsom
26	Llanelli	5–0	Gloucester City
32	Southwick	0–1	Haywards Heath
37	Eastbourne	1–2	Lancing Athletic
40	Bootle Athletic	1–0	Llandudno
45	Ellesmere Port Town	2–1	Marine
50	Burton Albion	3–0	Moor Green
53	Ilfracombe Town	2–1	Newton Abbot
57	Burscough	3–1	Penrith
61	Bangor City	3–2	Runcorn

== 1st qualifying round ==
=== Ties ===
Tie	Home team	Score	Away team
1	Alnwick Town	4–1	West Sleekburn Welfare
2	Amble	0–4	Ashington
3	Annfield Plain	6–2	Boldon Colliery Welfare
4	Ashford Town (Kent)	1–3	Hastings United
5	Ashton United	7–2	Skelmersdale United
6	Bangor City	2–0	St Helens Town
7	Barnet	1–2	St Albans City
8	Barnstaple Town	1–1	Taunton
9	Basford United	0–1	Boots Athletic
10	Basingstoke Town	3–1	Totton
11	Beccles	3–1	Bungay Town
12	Bedford Town	6–0	Potton United
13	Betteshanger Colliery Welfare	1–2	Ramsgate Athletic
14	Bexhill Town	1–2	Lancing Athletic
15	Biggleswade & District	0–3	Wolverton Town & B R
16	Billingham Synthonia	3–2	South Bank
17	Bootle Athletic	1–1	New Brighton
18	Boston United	5–4	Alford United
19	Bourne Town	0–5	Grantham
20	Bournemouth Gasworks Athletic	3–0	Poole Town
21	Bourneville Athletic	0–2	Rugby Town
22	Bridport	0–2	Dorchester Town
23	Brodsworth Main Colliery	0–5	Norton Woodseats
24	Bromley	0–1	Gravesend & Northfleet
25	Bromsgrove Rovers	3–2	Darlaston
26	Brunswick Institute	0–2	Beighton Miners Welfare
27	Brush Sports	5–0	Ibstock Penistone Rovers
28	Burscough	1–0	Lancaster City
29	Burton Albion	1–2	Bedworth Town
30	Bury Town	9–1	Leiston
31	Cambridge United	3–1	March Town United
32	Carshalton Athletic	3–0	Kingstonian
33	Cheshunt	2–1	Tufnell Park Edmonton
34	Chippenham United	2–2	Wells City
35	Cinderford Town	1–1	Cheltenham Town
36	Clacton Town	1–1	Romford
37	Clapton	1–2	Finchley
38	Clitheroe	1–1	Fleetwood
39	Coalville Town	7–1	Moira United
40	Cowes	0–1	Newport I O W
41	Cradley Heath	2–2	Bilston
42	Cramlington Welfare	0–1	Hexham Hearts
43	Creswell Colliery	2–0	Sutton Town
44	Dagenham	2–2	Briggs Sports
45	Dawdon Colliery Welfare	1–2	South Shields
46	Denaby United	2–1	Stocksbridge Works
47	Desborough Town	1–4	Corby Town
48	Diss Town	1–4	Lowestoft Town
49	Dover	2–0	Sheppey United
50	Dulwich Hamlet	2–1	Tooting & Mitcham United
51	Easington Colliery Welfare	3–0	Heaton Stannington
52	East Grinstead	1–0	Haywards Heath
53	Edgware Town	2–1	Slough Centre
54	Ellesmere Port Town	4–0	South Liverpool
55	Evenwood Town	1–0	Tow Law Town
56	Farsley Celtic	1–0	Ossett Town
57	Ferryhill Athletic	7–0	Skinnigrove Works
58	Frickley Colliery	2–2	Upton Colliery
59	Frome Town	3–6	Devizes Town
60	Gosforth & Coxlodge	0–5	Consett
61	Gothic	6–0	Wymondham Town
62	Grays Athletic	6–2	Harwich & Parkeston
63	Great Yarmouth Town	13–0	Cromer
64	Gresley Rovers	3–1	Gedling Colliery
65	Grimethorpe Athletic	3–1	Sheffield
66	Hayes	0–3	Uxbridge
67	Head Wrightsons	2–0	Bridlington Central United
68	Headington United	4–2	Aylesbury United
69	Hednesford Town	1–1	Nuneaton Borough
70	Hemel Hempstead	6–0	Abingdon Town
71	Hinckley Athletic	2–3	Whitwick Colliery
72	Hitchin Town	5–0	Luton Amateur
73	Horwich R M I	5–3	Chorley
74	Huntingdon United	0–3	Cambridge City
75	Ilfracombe Town	3–0	Bideford
76	Ilkeston Town	7–2	Long Eaton Town
77	Ilminster Town	2–1	Lymington
78	Kettering Town	1–0	Rushden Town
79	Kidderminster Harriers	2–0	Oswestry Town
80	King's Lynn	4–1	St Neots & District
81	Langold W M C	2–0	Bentley Colliery
82	Letchworth Town	1–1	Eton Manor
83	Linby Colliery	3–0	Bestwood Colliery
84	Littlehampton Town	0–3	Worthing
85	Lovells Athletic	0–1	Llanelli
86	Lye Town	1–3	Brierley Hill Alliance
87	Lysaghts Sports	1–9	Skegness Town
88	Macclesfield	3–0	Congleton Town
89	Maidenhead United	2–0	Bicester Town
90	Morecambe	1–0	Great Harwood
91	Mossley	3–1	Lytham
92	Netherfield	5–0	Bacup Borough
93	Newburn	4–1	Shankhouse
94	Newhall United	3–2	Matlock Town
95	Newquay	1–3	St Blazey
96	Northwich Victoria	1–1	Winsford United
97	Paulton Rovers	2–7	Bath City
98	Peasedown Miners Welfare	3–0	Radstock Town
99	Players Athletic	8–5	Shirebrook
100	Portland United	3–1	Shaftesbury
101	Prescot Cables	1–1	Flint Town United
102	Ransome & Marles	1–0	Cinderhill Colliery
103	Retford Town	8–2	Brigg Town
104	Rossendale United	2–0	Darwen
105	Ryde Sports	3–4	Alton Town
106	Salisbury	4–1	Westbury United
107	Seaham Colliery Welfare	1–3	Horden Colliery Welfare
108	Shildon	0–4	Crook Town
109	Silksworth Colliery Welfare	7–0	Murton Colliery Welfare
110	South Kirkby Colliery	2–1	Hallam
111	South Normanton Miners Welfare	4–0	Barwell Athletic
112	Spalding United	1–0	Stamford
113	Spencer Moulton	0–3	Chippenham Town
114	St Austell	2–3	Bridgwater Town
115	Stalybridge Celtic	3–2	Hyde United
116	Stanley United	2–4	Spennymoor United
117	Stonehouse	0–1	Ebbw Vale
118	Stowmarket	4–0	Thetford Town
119	Street	1–2	Glastonbury
120	Sutton Town (Birmingham)	1–2	Atherstone Town
121	Sutton United	3–2	Hounslow Town
122	Symingtons Recreation	2–5	Peterborough United
123	Tilbury	1–0	Ilford
124	Troedyrhiw	3–8	Barry Town
125	Tunbridge Wells United	2–4	Sittingbourne
126	Ushaw Moor	2–0	Chilton Athletic
127	Vauxhall Motors	2–4	Eynesbury Rovers
128	Warminster Town	1–1	Trowbridge Town
129	Wealdstone	0–1	Hendon
130	Whitton United	0–4	Sudbury Town
131	Willington	2–4	West Auckland Town
132	Winchester City	1–0	Gosport Borough Athletic
133	Wisbech Town	3–0	Histon Institute
134	Woking	1–2	Wimbledon
135	Woodford Town	2–1	Stevenage Town
136	Worksop Town	3–3	Rawmarsh Welfare
137	Wycombe Wanderers	4–2	Huntley & Palmers

=== Replays ===
Tie	Home team	Score	Away team
8	Taunton	3–5	Barnstaple Town
17	New Brighton	1–0	Bootle Athletic
34	Wells City	3–1	Chippenham United
35	Cheltenham Town	5–0	Cinderford Town
36	Romford	1–3	Clacton Town
38	Fleetwood	1–2	Clitheroe
41	Bilston	3–1	Cradley Heath
44	Briggs Sports	0–0	Dagenham (Abandoned in extra time)
58	Upton Colliery	0–2	Frickley Colliery
69	Nuneaton Borough	2–5	Hednesford Town
82	Eton Manor	1–1	Letchworth Town
96	Winsford United	4–2	Northwich Victoria
101	Flint Town United	3–0	Prescot Cables
128	Trowbridge Town	4–1	Warminster Town
136	Rawmarsh Welfare	3–2	Worksop Town

=== 2nd replays ===
Tie	Home team	Score	Away team
44	Briggs Sports	1–3	Dagenham
82	Letchworth Town	0–3	Eton Manor

== 2nd qualifying round ==
=== Ties ===
Tie	Home team	Score	Away team
1	Alnwick Town	0–1	Newburn
2	Ashton United	2–1	Horwich R M I
3	Atherstone Town	2–0	Rugby Town
4	Bangor City	2–0	New Brighton
5	Barnstaple Town	4–2	Bridgwater Town
6	Basingstoke Town	2–0	Alton Town
7	Bath City	2–0	Wells City
8	Beighton Miners Welfare	6–0	Rawmarsh Welfare
9	Billingham Synthonia	6–1	Head Wrightsons
10	Boots Athletic	2–2	Newhall United
11	Bournemouth Gasworks Athletic	5–1	Portland United
12	Bromsgrove Rovers	1–0	Bilston
13	Brush Sports	3–1	Coalville Town
14	Burscough	2–4	Netherfield
15	Bury Town	1–1	Stowmarket
16	Cambridge City	3–3	King's Lynn
17	Cambridge United	0–0	Wisbech Town
18	Cheltenham Town	0–3	Barry Town
19	Cheshunt	0–1	Eton Manor
20	Clacton Town	6–2	Tilbury
21	Clitheroe	0–1	Morecambe
22	Corby Town	1–1	Kettering Town
23	Creswell Colliery	3–0	Ransome & Marles
24	Crook Town	1–2	Spennymoor United
25	Dagenham	0–1	Grays Athletic
26	Denaby United	1–0	Grimethorpe Athletic
27	Devizes Town	0–3	Trowbridge Town
28	Dorchester Town	6–1	Ilminster Town
29	Dover	5–3	Ramsgate Athletic
30	Dulwich Hamlet	3–3	Wimbledon
31	Easington Colliery Welfare	2–2	Consett
32	East Grinstead	0–1	Lancing Athletic
33	Ebbw Vale	0–3	Llanelli
34	Ellesmere Port Town	1–2	Flint Town United
35	Eynesbury Rovers	0–4	Bedford Town
36	Ferryhill Athletic	4–0	Whitby Town
37	Finchley	2–0	Woodford Town
38	Frickley Colliery	4–0	South Kirkby Colliery
39	Goole Town	3–3	Farsley Celtic
40	Gothic	0–5	Great Yarmouth Town
41	Gravesend & Northfleet	3–0	Sittingbourne
42	Gresley Rovers	0–5	Ilkeston Town
43	Headington United	2–0	Maidenhead United
44	Hednesford Town	0–3	Bedworth Town
45	Hemel Hempstead	1–2	Wycombe Wanderers
46	Hexham Hearts	3–5	Ashington
47	Hitchin Town	3–0	Wolverton Town & B R
48	Horden Colliery Welfare	3–0	Blackhall Colliery Welfare
49	Ilfracombe Town	2–0	St Blazey
50	Kidderminster Harriers	1–1	Brierley Hill Alliance
51	Langold W M C	0–4	Norton Woodseats
52	Linby Colliery	6–0	Players Athletic
53	Mossley	1–0	Rossendale United
54	Peasedown Miners Welfare	0–1	Glastonbury
55	Retford Town	1–4	Boston United
56	Salisbury	3–1	Chippenham Town
57	Selby Town	2–1	Yorkshire Amateur
58	Sheringham	2–2	Beccles
59	Skegness Town	2–0	Grantham
60	South Normanton Miners Welfare	3–0	Whitwick Colliery
61	South Shields	3–1	Annfield Plain
62	Spalding United	2–2	Peterborough United
63	St Albans City	1–1	Hendon
64	Stalybridge Celtic	2–2	Altrincham
65	Sudbury Town	4–0	Lowestoft Town
66	Sutton United	0–2	Carshalton Athletic
67	Ushaw Moor	4–1	Silksworth Colliery Welfare
68	Uxbridge	2–1	Edgware Town
69	West Auckland Town	1–2	Evenwood Town
70	Winchester City	1–3	Newport I O W
71	Winsford United	1–0	Macclesfield
72	Worthing	2–2	Hastings United

=== Replays ===
Tie	Home team	Score	Away team
10	Newhall United	0–2	Boots Athletic
15	Stowmarket	2–4	Bury Town
16	King's Lynn	5–1	Cambridge City
17	Wisbech Town	2–3	Cambridge United
22	Kettering Town	0–2	Corby Town
30	Wimbledon	5–2	Dulwich Hamlet
31	Consett	3–0	Easington Colliery Welfare
39	Farsley Celtic	3–4	Goole Town
50	Brierley Hill Alliance	1–2	Kidderminster Harriers
58	Beccles	2–1	Sheringham
62	Peterborough United	3–0	Spalding United
63	Hendon	3–1	St Albans City
64	Altrincham	2–1	Stalybridge Celtic
72	Hastings United	1–3	Worthing

== 3rd qualifying round ==
=== Ties ===
Tie	Home team	Score	Away team
1	Ashton United	2–1	Mossley
2	Atherstone Town	1–1	Bedworth Town
3	Bangor City	4–2	Flint Town United
4	Barnstaple Town	0–0	Ilfracombe Town
5	Barry Town	1–1	Llanelli
6	Basingstoke Town	2–4	Newport I O W
7	Beighton Miners Welfare	1–1	Norton Woodseats
8	Billingham Synthonia	5–0	Ferryhill Athletic
9	Boston United	3–2	Skegness Town
10	Bromsgrove Rovers	0–2	Kidderminster Harriers
11	Brush Sports	3–1	South Normanton Miners Welfare
12	Bury Town	3–0	Sudbury Town
13	Cambridge United	0–0	King's Lynn
14	Carshalton Athletic	3–4	Wimbledon
15	Consett	4–0	South Shields
16	Corby Town	0–0	Peterborough United
17	Dorchester Town	2–1	Bournemouth Gasworks Athletic
18	Eton Manor	0–1	Finchley
19	Evenwood Town	1–1	Spennymoor United
20	Frickley Colliery	1–1	Denaby United
21	Glastonbury	0–3	Bath City
22	Gravesend & Northfleet	2–1	Dover
23	Grays Athletic	2–1	Clacton Town
24	Great Yarmouth Town	2–1	Beccles
25	Headington United	6–2	Wycombe Wanderers
26	Hendon	3–1	Uxbridge
27	Hitchin Town	2–3	Bedford Town
28	Horden Colliery Welfare	3–1	Ushaw Moor
29	Ilkeston Town	4–0	Boots Athletic
30	Lancing Athletic	2–0	Worthing
31	Linby Colliery	0–0	Creswell Colliery
32	Netherfield	3–1	Morecambe
33	Newburn	1–4	Ashington
34	Salisbury	0–2	Trowbridge Town
35	Selby Town	4–1	Goole Town
36	Winsford United	0–1	Altrincham

=== Replays ===
Tie	Home team	Score	Away team
2	Bedworth Town	2–0	Atherstone Town
4	Ilfracombe Town	1–0	Barnstaple Town
5	Llanelli	3–0	Barry Town
7	Norton Woodseats	1–3	Beighton Miners Welfare
13	King's Lynn	4–0	Cambridge United
16	Peterborough United	5–3	Corby Town
19	Spennymoor United	4–1	Evenwood Town
20	Denaby United	3–4	Frickley Colliery
31	Creswell Colliery	0–0	Linby Colliery

=== 2nd replay ===
Tie	Home team	Score	Away team
31	Creswell Colliery	0–5	Linby Colliery

== 4th qualifying round ==
The teams that given byes to this round are: Bishop Auckland, Yeovil Town, Leytonstone, Guildford City, Chelmsford City, Gainsborough Trinity, Stockton, Dartford, Witton Albion, Weymouth, North Shields, Rhyl, Merthyr Tydfil, Hereford United, Scarborough, Wigan Athletic, Nelson, Worcester City, Tonbridge, Blyth Spartans, Wellington Town, Buxton, Folkestone and Gorleston

=== Ties ===
Tie	Home team	Score	Away team
1	Ashington	4–0	Billingham Synthonia
2	Ashton United	3–1	Altrincham
3	Bath City	3–0	Trowbridge Town
4	Boston United	3–2	Frickley Colliery
5	Brush Sports	0–1	Hereford United
6	Buxton	2–3	Beighton Miners Welfare
7	Chelmsford City	0–0	Finchley
8	Consett	1–3	North Shields
9	Dartford	0–3	Hendon
10	Dorchester Town	1–5	Weymouth
11	Folkestone	0–0	Tonbridge
12	Gainsborough Trinity	5–1	Ilkeston Town
13	Gorleston	1–4	Leytonstone
14	Grays Athletic	0–0	King's Lynn
15	Great Yarmouth Town	2–0	Bury Town
16	Guildford City	2–1	Headington United
17	Horden Colliery Welfare	2–1	Blyth Spartans
18	Kidderminster Harriers	1–1	Bedworth Town
19	Lancing Athletic	1–5	Newport I O W
20	Llanelli	1–0	Ilfracombe Town
21	Nelson	1–3	Rhyl
22	Peterborough United	2–1	Bedford Town
23	Scarborough	5–1	Stockton
24	Selby Town	4–2	Linby Colliery
25	Spennymoor United	1–1	Bishop Auckland
26	Wellington Town	1–0	Worcester City
27	Wigan Athletic	2–3	Netherfield
28	Wimbledon	4–2	Gravesend & Northfleet
29	Witton Albion	0–2	Bangor City
30	Yeovil Town	1–0	Merthyr Tydfil

=== Replays ===
Tie	Home team	Score	Away team
7	Finchley	3–0	Chelmsford City
11	Tonbridge	4–4	Folkestone
14	King's Lynn	0–2	Grays Athletic
18	Bedworth Town	0–2	Kidderminster Harriers
25	Bishop Auckland	2–1	Spennymoor United

=== 2nd replay ===
Tie	Home team	Score	Away team
11	Folkestone	0–2	Tonbridge

== 1952–53 FA Cup ==
See 1952–53 FA Cup for details of the rounds from the first round proper onwards.
