= George Pickering (cricketer) =

Australian cricketer (1832–1858)

Personal information
- Born: 1832; Sydney, Australia
- Died: 1 December 1858 (aged 25–26); Sandridge, Victoria, Australia

Domestic team information
- Years: Team
- 1858: Victoria
- Source: Cricinfo, 2 May 2015

George Pickering (1832 – 1 December 1858) was an Australian cricketer. He played one first-class cricket match for Victoria in 1858. His preferred batting style was left-handed batting.

== See also ==
- List of Victoria first-class cricketers
