= Senator Pickering (disambiguation) =

Timothy Pickering (1745–1829) was a U.S. Senator from Massachusetts from 1803 to 1811. Senator Pickering may also refer to:

- Charles W. Pickering (born 1937), Mississippi State Senate
- Stacey Pickering (born 1968), Mississippi State Senate
