= Justice Pickering =

Justice Pickering may refer to:

- John Pickering (judge) (1737–1805), chief justice of the New Hampshire Supreme Court
- Kristina Pickering (born 1952), chief justice of the Supreme Court of Nevada (2013, 2020–present)

== See also ==
- Judge Pickering (disambiguation)
