= Charles Pickering =

Charles Pickering may refer to:

- Charles Pickering (naturalist) (1805–1878), physician and naturalist
- Charles Percy Pickering (1825–1908), Australian photographer, Art Gallery of New South Wales
- Charles W. Pickering (born 1937), Appeals Court judge
- Chip Pickering (born 1963), U.S. Representative from Mississippi, son of the judge
- Charles W. Pickering (United States Navy officer) (1815–1888), American Union Navy Civil War officer

== See also ==
- Charlie Pickering (born 1977), Australian comedian
