= Thomas G. Pickering =

British physician and academic

Thomas G. Pickering (1940 – 2009) was a British physician and academic. He was a professor of medicine at College of Physicians and Surgeons, Columbia University Medical Center in New York City. He was an internationally renowned expert in clinical hypertension and a leader in the fields of hypertension and cardiovascular behavioral medicine. He coined the term "white-coat hypertension" to describe those whose blood pressure was elevated in the doctor's office, but normal in everyday life. He later published the first editorial describing "masked hypertension" (the opposite phenomenon). He also discovered and gave his name to the Pickering Syndrome, where bilateral renal artery stenosis causes flash pulmonary edema.

== Education ==
Pickering received his Bachelor of Medicine, Bachelor of Surgery at the University of Cambridge in 1966 followed by Membership of the Royal College of Physicians in 1968. In 1970 he earned his Doctor of Philosophy at the University of Oxford and gained Fellowship of the Royal College of Physicians in 1980.

== Biography ==
Pickering was the son of Sir George Pickering, Oxford Regius Professor of Medicine. He began his career as house physician and surgeon at the Middlesex Hospital in London in 1967. He moved to the Radcliffe Infirmary, Oxford in 1968 to undertake a Medical Research Council Fellowship and then became a registrar within the Nuffield Department of Clinical Medicine.

In 1972, Pickering took up the position of Assistant Professor at Rockefeller University in New York City. Moving to Cornell University Medical School (now Weill Cornell Medicine) in 1974, Pickering held a number of positions over the next 24 years becoming Director of the Coronary Care Unit in 1981 and Professor of Medicine and Attending Physician in 1985. Here he undertook a program of research on behavioral aspects of hypertension and cardiovascular disease. Pickering continued his work as Director of the Integrative and Behavioral Cardiology Program at Mount Sinai Hospital in New York City in 2000, finally relocating to Columbia University Medical Center in New York City in 2003 to form the Center for Behavioral Cardiovascular Health where he worked until his death in 2009. He died from brain cancer.

Although he participated in a great deal of physiological research early in his career, Pickering's research in behavioral determinants and consequences of hypertension formed the heart of the program. Thus, Pickering was one of the earliest researchers to employ ambulatory blood pressure (ABP) monitoring, and contributed to the knowledge that clinic blood pressure measures are prone to both unsystematic and systematic errors, and are hence less useful for the prediction of target organ damage and adverse cardiovascular events than ABP. In the course of this research, he began to examine the nature of the errors more closely; for example, he was one of the first to identify the phenomenon of "white coat hypertension", in which patients exhibit poor blood pressure control only in the physician's office, leading to a false diagnosis of hypertension and unnecessary prescription of medication. Pickering was the Principal Investigator of a National Heart Lung and Blood institute Program Project that began in 1993 and has investigated several phenomena related to the behavioral causes and physiological consequences of hypertension, focusing on white coat hypertension, nocturnal blood pressure "dipping", race differences in PSG-assessed sleep quality and target organ damage, and the effects of work-related stress on blood pressure and left ventricular hypertrophy (LVH). The latter study remains one of the few prospective demonstrations that environmental stress is associated with hypertension and LVH.

== Membership and honors ==
Pickering served as a member and leader of a number of professional organizations at both the national and international levels. He was President of the Society of Behavioral Medicine, and the Academy of Behavioral Medicine Research. Pickering was also a member of the National Heart, Lung, and Blood Institute's Task Force on Behavioral Medicine, on the Board of Directors of the American Heart Association, and a member of the Committee on Gulf War and Stress of the Institute of Medicine. He served as Secretary and Program Chair of the American Society of Hypertension, and was on the Food and Drug Administration's Cardio Renal Advisory Board. Pickering served on the editorial boards of a number of behavioral medicine and cardiology journals, being an editor of Blood Pressure Monitoring, a senior editor of Clinical Cardiology Reports, and the Associate Editor in Chief of the Journal of Clinical Hypertension.

== Publications ==
Pickering published over 700 articles in scientific journals as well as 3 books. His research focused on his core belief that much of cardiovascular disease arises from psychosocial factors, and is hence potentially preventable or treatable by modifying these. Selected publications; see list of available records in PubMed:

1. Pickering TG, Gerin W, Schwartz JE, Spruill TM, Davidson KW. Franz Volhard lecture: Should doctors still measure blood pressure? The missing patients with masked hypertension. J Hypertens. 2008;26(12):2259-2267.
2. Pickering TG, Miller NH, Ogedegbe G, Krakoff LR, Artinian NT, Goff D. Call to Action on Use and Reimbursement for Home Blood Pressure Monitoring. A Joint Scientific Statement from the American Heart Association, American Society of Hypertension, and Preventive Cardiovascular Nurses Association. Hypertension. 2008;52(1):10-29.
3. Pickering TGS, D.;Haas, D. Ambulatory blood-pressure monitoring. N Engl J Med. 2006;354(22):2368-2374.
4. Pickering TG, Hall JE, Appel LJ, et al. Recommendations for blood pressure measurement in humans and experimental animals: part 1: blood pressure measurement in humans: a statement for professionals from the Subcommittee of Professional and Public Education of the American Heart Association Council on High Blood Pressure Research. Circulation. 2005;111(5):697-716.
5. Verdecchia P, Reboldi GP, Angeli F, Schillaci G, Schwartz JE, Pickering TG, Imai Y, Ohkubo T, Kario K. Short- and long-term incidence of stroke in white-coat hypertension. Hypertension 2005;45(2):203-208
6. Pickering T, Schwartz JE, Verdecchia P, Imai Y, Kario K. An international database of prospective ambulatory blood pressure monitoring studies. Blood Press Monit 2003;8(4):147-149.
7. Pickering TG, Davidson K, Gerin W, Schwartz JE. Masked hypertension. Hypertension. 2002;40(6):795-796.
8. Pickering TG, Gerin W, Schwartz AR. What is the white-coat effect and how should it be measured? Blood Press Monit. 2002;7(6):293-300.
9. Pickering TG. Mental stress as a causal factor in the development of hypertension and cardiovascular disease. Curr Hypertens Rep. 2001;3(3):249-254.
10. Pickering TG, Kario K. Nocturnal non-dipping: what does it augur? Curr Opin Nephrol Hypertens. 2001;10(5):611-616.
11. Pickering T. Cardiovascular pathways: socioeconomic status and stress effects on hypertension and cardiovascular function. Ann N Y Acad Sci. 1999;896:262-277
12. Pickering TG, Coats A, Mallion JM, Mancia G, Verdecchia P. Blood Pressure Monitoring. Task force V: White-coat hypertension. Blood Press Monit. 1999;4(6):333-341.
13. Schnall PL, Schwartz JE, Landsbergis PA, Warren K, Pickering TG. A longitudinal study of job strain and ambulatory blood pressure: Results from a three-year follow-up. Psychosom Med 1998;60(6):697-706.
14. Pickering, TG. Good News About High Blood Pressure: Everything You Need to Know to Take Control of Hypertension...and Your Life. New York: Fireside. 1997
15. Pickering TG, Devereux RB, James GD, et al. Environmental influences on blood pressure and the role of job strain. J Hypertens Suppl. 1996;14(5):S179-185.
16. Pickering TG. White coat hypertension. Curr Opin Nephrol Hypertens. 1996;5(2):192-198.
17. Pickering TG, James GD. Ambulatory blood pressure and prognosis. J Hypertens Suppl. 1994;12(8):S29-33.
18. Pickering TG, James GD. Determinants and consequences of the diurnal rhythm of blood pressure. Am J Hypertens. 1993;6(6 Pt 2):166s-169s.
19. Pickering, TG. Modern Approaches to Blood Pressure Measurement. London: Science Press. 1992.
20. Schnall PL, Schwartz JE, Landsbergis PA, Warren K, Pickering TG. Relation between job strain, alcohol, and ambulatory blood pressure. Hypertension 1992;19(5):488-494.
21. Pickering, TG, Pieper C, Schechter CB. Ambulatory Monitoring and Blood Pressure Variability. London: Science Press. 1991.
22. Pickering TG. The clinical significance of diurnal blood pressure variations. Dippers and nondippers. Circulation. 1990;81(2):700-702.
23. Schnall PL, Pieper C, Schwartz JE, Karasek RA, Schlussel Y, Devereux RB, Ganau A, Alderman M, Warren K, Pickering TG. The relationship between 'job strain,' workplace diastolic blood pressure, and left ventricular mass index. Results of a case-control study. JAMA 1990;263(14):1929-1935.
24. Pickering TG, James GD, Boddie C, Harshfield GA, Blank S, Laragh JH. How common is white coat hypertension? JAMA. 1988;259(2):225-228.
25. Pickering TG, Devereux RB. Ambulatory monitoring of blood pressure as a predictor of cardiovascular risk. Am Heart J. 1987;114(4 Pt 2):925-928.
26. Pickering TG, Harshfield GA, Devereux RB, Laragh JH. What is the role of ambulatory blood pressure monitoring in the management of hypertensive patients? Hypertension. 1985;7(2):171-177.
27. Pickering TG, Harshfield GA, Kleinert HD, Blank S, Laragh JH. Blood pressure during normal daily activities, sleep, and exercise. Comparison of values in normal and hypertensive subjects. JAMA. 1982;247(7):992-996.
28. Pickering TG, Gribbin B, Sleight P. Comparison of the reflex heart rate response to rising and falling arterial pressure in man. Cardiovasc Res. 1972;6(3):277-283.
29. Pickering TG, Gribbin B, Petersen ES, Cunningham DJ, Sleight P. Effects of autonomic blockade on the baroreflex in man at rest and during exercise. Circ Res. 1972;30(2):177-185.
