= James Mellor Brown =

English cleric (1796–1867)

James Mellor Brown (1796–1867) was a British cleric, known as a scriptural geologist.

== Early life ==
He was born in Kingston, Jamaica, the son of James Brown (died 1816) of Gattonside House, a planter in Jamaica, and his wife Ann Mellor; Abner William Brown, who pursued also a clerical career, was his brother. A codicil to his father's will shows that his mother had died by 1813. Four children of the marriage died in Jamaica. A sister Isabella (1791–1871), who was painted as a girl by Henry Raeburn, moved back to the United Kingdom with her two brothers.

James Brown the elder spent his final years at Gattonside House, which was built over the period 1808 to 1811. He left a detailed will. James Mellor Brown was educated at the High School, Edinburgh.

On his father's death, Brown was aged 19, while Isabella was 24, and Abner was 15. James had possession of the Bryan's Hill estate in Jamaica until 1823. It went to John Wiles (1778–1842) of Jamaica. Brown freed a number of enslaved people named in his father's will. The brothers sold the house, at some point, and the family moved to England. Brown married his first wife, from Yorkshire, in 1824.

== Cambridge and early clerical career ==
Having lost his wife, Brown entered Queens' College, Cambridge in 1825, and matriculated in 1826. He graduated B.A. in 1830. He was ordained deacon and then priest in 1829. At that point he was licensed to Little Dunham. With his brother Abner, who arrived at Cambridge a year after he did, Brown associated with a group of evangelically minded young men around Charles Longuet Higgins, who graduated in the same year, and was influenced by Charles Simeon. They were identified by John William Burgon, in his Twelve Good Men, as 18 in number. They included Anthony Thomas Carr, at Queens' with Brown, who kept in touch. Another of the group, and also at Queens' at the time, was William Leeke. With Carr and the Browns, he recruited pupils for a Sunday School in Jesus Lane. It was being set up by Joseph Harden, mentioned by Burgon, and others; and from a start in 1827, in the Friends' Meeting House, Jesus Lane, became a Cambridge institution.

In 1831 Brown was appointed curate to Hylton Chapel of Bishopwearmouth. He replaced there Boulby Thomas Haslewood, who had been in the position since 1821. The rector of Bishopwearmouth in 1831 was Gerald Valerian Wellesley (1770–1848), younger brother of the Duke of Wellington. But according to a history of the chapel (later St Mary's Church, South Hylton), the nomination was by Wellesley's predecessor, Robert Gray. The reason lay in the history of Hylton Chapel. It had been Hylton Lodge of Low Ford Farm, on the estate of Thomas James Maling, and was licensed to serve as a chapel of ease in 1817: it was consecrated in 1821. Maling gave the advowson to Gray. Brown was succeeded as curate in 1833 by William Chaplin.

In his doctoral dissertation, Mortenson identified a hiatus in Brown's clerical appointments from 1833 to 1839. While other biographical issues raised by Mortenson can be resolved, this one remains. Brown gave a sermon in 1834 at Aberystwyth for a Church Missionary Society meeting. An advertisement for his Reflections on Geology of 1838 has him of "Hylton, Durham".

== Rector of Isham ==
Brown was rector of Isham from 1839 to 1867. He owed the position to the patronage of John Kaye, the predecessor of Robert Gray at Bristol who had become Bishop of Lincoln in 1827. Kaye has been described as a "moderate Tory", "High Churchman" and "Church reformer". He is identified with Hackney Phalanx High Church group.

The situation in the 1830s was that Isham in Northamptonshire was considered to be two parishes, rather than one: Isham Inferior or Lower Isham; and Isham Superior or Upper Isham. From an administrative point of view, the appointment was complicated, involving an anomalous situation comparable to a moiety title. Henry Thursby, later Henry Thursby Pelham, had been rector of Lower Isham since 1825. His resignation in 1839, to take up his father's living at Cound, created the vacancy. Edward Hatch Hoare had been rector of Upper Isham from 1826 to 1829. He was then at Barkby, for the rest of his life. He was related, rather distantly, to the Hoare banking family.

In 1829 John Edward Henry Simpson, a graduate of Trinity College, Dublin, was appointed curate to both Isham moieties. An entry in the Irish Church Directory under the diocese of Clogher may mean he returned to Monaghan and a Church of Ireland curacy in 1835. Brown's sons Henry and William were born at Isham, in 1837 and 1838. A report in the Ecclesiastical Gazette for 14 May 1839 stated that Brown had been appointed to Isham Superior, patron E. H. Hoare. This could refer to Edward Henry Hoare, father of Edward Hatch Hoare, a landowner in County Cork.

Isham Inferior was, as a matter of patronage, in the hands of the Bishop of Lincoln. Kaye obtained patronage for the other part, Isham Superior, also identified as the "Over Fee", by an exchange with the Rev. Sir George Stamp Robinson, 7th Baronet who held the advowson, and the moieties were united by Order in Council in 1841. The patronage was transferred in 1852 to the Diocese of Peterborough, in which the parish lay.

== Works ==
With his work Reflections on Geology (1838), Brown entered the debate going back to the Reliquiæ Diluvianæ (1823) by William Buckland. He has been grouped with Granville Penn, George Bugg and George Fairholme, as one of the four major proponents of "scriptural geology". Other representative figures in flood geology were John Murray and George Young. Buckland had supporters in Thomas Chalmers, Hugh Miller and John Pye Smith.

Brown has been identified as an evangelical, but questionably in terms of the usage of the time. Kaye who gave him patronage at Isham belonged to the Hackney Phalanx High Church tendency, and was averse to evangelicals, speaking against their preferment. Brown argued that geologists were "attacking the truth of God". The geological research of the 1830s, however, divided conservative and evangelical opinion. He was at the time in a minority, in believing that geology was incompatible with the Book of Genesis. Indeed, Chalmers and Pye Smith were hostile to Brown and Bugg. The full title of the Reflections states that the work was prompted by Buckland's Bridgewater Treatise: this was Geology and Mineralogy considered with reference to Natural Theology from 1837. It had been preceded by After Thoughts on Reading Dr. Buckland's Bridgewater Treatise (1837) by the Rev. Samuel Best (1803–1873). A key change in Buckland's position of 1836, as against his explanations of 1823 in Reliquiæ Diluvianæ, was to discount sediment from Noah's Flood. He mentioned it only in passing, as of minimal use when it came to explaining observed stratigraphy. Brown found it particularly sinister that Buckland denied that the Flood must have been universal.

Pye Smith's view was

The best friends of Science will unite with [Brown] in deprecating the pride and vanity which pretend to carry researches beyond the limits which the Author of our nature has prescribed. But he has not brought an atom of evidence to prove that the efforts of Geology [...] involve any excursion whatsoever out of those limits.

In his address to parishioners of 1840, Brown mentioned religious societies, as worthy of charitable support: the Church Missionary Society, SPG, SPCK, the National Society and the Society for Building and Enlarging Churches. He also spoke against Chartism, mentioning the recent Newport Rising and the Sheffield rising (planned by Samuel Holberry and others); deprecated slavery in the United States, and proposed emigration as a solution to the pressures of population. There was a reply from John Jenkinson of Kettering, a Baptist and Chartist.

== Family ==
Brown married, firstly, in 1824, Mary Smith, daughter of Jacob Smith, of Givendale Grange, Yorkshire. A son by this marriage was James Smith Brown, a cleric, born in Liverpool. He was a graduate of St Catharine's College, Cambridge, and rector of Hardwick, Cambridgeshire from 1872 to 1892. Mary died in 1825, at age 25.

Brown married, secondly, in 1831, Elizabeth Helen Newton, daughter of Henry Newton of Guisborough. She died at Isham Rectory, on 13 January 1867. The three sons by this marriage, all students at the University of Cambridge, were:

- Abner Edmund Brown (died 1897), was a curate at Isham 1858 to 1867, and went on to further curacies.
- Henry Brown (1837–1899) became a cleric of the Scottish Episcopal Church. The writer Margaret Lumley Brown was his daughter.
- William Mellor Brown (1838–1860) died as an undergraduate.
