= 1857 in the United Kingdom =

Events from the year 1857 in the United Kingdom.

== Incumbents ==
- Monarch – Victoria
- Prime Minister – Henry John Temple, 3rd Viscount Palmerston (Whig)

== Events ==
- 7 January – London General Omnibus Company begins operating.
- 19 February – Lundhill Colliery explosion at Wombwell in the South Yorkshire Coalfield kills 189 miners.
- 3 March – France and the United Kingdom formally declare war on China in the Second Opium War.
- 5 March – In London, barrister James Townsend Saward receives a sentence of penal transportation for forgery of cheques.
- 27 March–24 April – A general election secures Palmerston's Whigs a clear majority.
- 4 April – End of the Anglo-Persian War.
- 5 May–17 October – The Art Treasures of Great Britain exhibition is held in Manchester, one of the largest such displays of all time.
- 10 May – Indian Rebellion: The XI Native Cavalry of the Bengal Army in Meerut, India, mutiny against the British East India Company.
- 11 May – Indian combatants capture Delhi from the East India Company.
- 18 May – The British Museum Reading Room opens.
- 22 June – The South Kensington Museum, predecessor of the Victoria and Albert Museum, is opened by Queen Victoria in London; it is the world’s first museum to incorporate a refreshment room.
- 25 June – Queen Victoria formally grants her husband Albert the title Prince Consort.
- 26 June – At a ceremony in Hyde Park, London, Queen Victoria awards the first sixty-six Victoria Crosses, for actions during the Crimean War. Commander Henry James Raby, RN, is the first to receive the medal from her hands.
- 12 July – In Belfast, confrontations between crowds of Catholics and Protestants turn into 10 days of rioting, exacerbated by the open-air preaching of Evangelical Presbyterian minister "Roaring" Hugh Hanna, with many of the police force joining the Protestant side. There are also riots in Derry, Portadown and Lurgan.
- 18 July – Prison hulk HMS Defence catches fire at her moorings off Woolwich, bringing an end to the use of hulks in home waters.
- 25 August – Obscene Publications Act makes the sale of obscene material a statutory offence.
- 28 August – Matrimonial Causes Act removes divorce from ecclesiastical jurisdiction and makes it possible by order of a new civil Court for Divorce and Matrimonial Causes, removing the necessity of parliamentary approval.
- 20 September – British forces recapture Delhi, compelling the surrender of Bahadur Shah II, the last Mughal emperor.
- 24 October – Sheffield F.C., the world's first football team, is founded in Sheffield.
- November – Kilburn White Horse cut in North Yorkshire.
- 29 November – Orsini affair: Piedmontese revolutionary Felice Orsini leaves exile in London to make an assassination attempt on Emperor Napoleon III of France in Paris.
- 31 December – Queen Victoria chooses Ottawa as the capital of Canada.

=== Undated ===
- First official issue of uniforms of the Royal Navy to naval ratings.
- Tom Gallaher sets up the Gallaher tobacco business in Ireland.

== Publications ==
- R. M. Ballantyne's children's novel The Coral Island (dated 1858).
- George Borrow's novel The Romany Rye.
- Charlotte Brontë's novel The Professor (posthumously, as by 'Currer Bell').
- Charles Dickens's novel Little Dorrit (complete in book form).
- Elizabeth Gaskell's biography The Life of Charlotte Brontë.
- P. H. Gosse's creationist text Omphalos.
- Thomas Hughes' novel Tom Brown's Schooldays.
- George A. Lawrence's novel Guy Livingstone, or Thorough (anonymously).
- John Ruskin's introductory text The Elements of Drawing.
- William Makepeace Thackeray's historical novel The Virginians (begins serialisation).
- Anthony Trollope's novel Barchester Towers.

== Births ==
- 18 January – William Lethaby, Arts and Crafts architect and designer (died 1931)
- 25 January – Hugh Lowther, 5th Earl of Lonsdale, sportsman (died 1944)
- 31 January – George Jackson Churchward, chief mechanical engineer of the Great Western Railway (died 1933)
- 2 February – Sir James Cory, 1st Baronet, politician and ship-owner (died 1933)
- 22 February – Robert Baden-Powell, founder of the Scouting movement (died 1941)
- 13 March – Herbert Plumer, 1st Viscount Plumer, general (died 1932)
- 14 March – Ishbel Hamilton-Gordon, Marchioness of Aberdeen and Temair, patron and promoter of women's interests (died 1939)
- 27 March – Karl Pearson, statistician (died 1936)
- 8 April – Lucy, Lady Houston, born Fanny Lucy Radmall, political activist, suffragette, philanthropist and promoter of aviation (died 1936)
- 11 April – John Davidson, Scottish-born poet and playwright (suicide 1909)
- 14 April
  - Princess Beatrice of the United Kingdom, member of the royal family (died 1944)
  - Victor Horsley, physician, surgeon (died 1916)
- 13 May – Ronald Ross, physician, recipient of the Nobel Prize in Physiology or Medicine (died 1932)
- 15 May – Williamina Fleming, astronomer (died 1911)
- 28 May – Charles Voysey, Arts and Crafts designer and domestic architect (died 1941)
- 2 June – Edward Elgar, composer (died 1934)
- 12 June – Kate Lester, stage and silent screen actress (died 1924)
- 15 June – William Fife, Scottish yacht designer (died 1944)
- 28 June – Robert Jones, Welsh orthopaedic surgeon (died 1933)
- 19 September – James Bridie, rugby union international (died 1893)
- 28 September – Lewis Bayly, admiral (died 1938)
- 2 October
  - John Macintyre Scottish laryngologist and pioneer radiographer (died 1928)
  - A. E. Waite, occultist (died 1942)
- 4 October – Will Thorne, trade unionist (died 1946)
- 5 November – Joseph Tabrar, songwriter (died 1931)
- 17 November – George Marchant, inventor, manufacturer and philanthropist (died 1941)
- 22 November – George Gissing, novelist (died 1903)
- 27 November – Charles Scott Sherrington, physiologist, Nobel Prize laureate (died 1952)
- 30 November – Bobby Abel, cricketer (died 1936)
- 2 December – Robert Armstrong-Jones, physician and psychiatrist (died 1943)

== Deaths ==
- 1 January – John Britton, antiquary and topographer (born 1771)
- 2 January – Andrew Ure, doctor and writer (born 1778)
- 7 January – Joseph Brotherton, radical and pioneer vegetarian (born 1783)
- 20 January – John Manners, 5th Duke of Rutland (born 1778)
- 27 January – Edward Alderson, judge (born 1857)
- 10 February – David Thompson, explorer (born 1787)
- 18 February – Francis Egerton, 1st Earl of Ellesmere, politician (born 1800)
- 22 February – Henry Lascelles, 3rd Earl of Harewood, peer and Member of Parliament (born 1797)
- 13 March – William Amherst, 1st Earl Amherst, diplomat and peer (born 1773)
- 11 May – Granville Waldegrave, 2nd Baron Radstock, naval officer (born 1786)
- 16 May – Sir William Lloyd, soldier and mountaineer (born 1782)
- 27 May – George Anson, army officer and Whig politician (born 1797)
- 12 August – William Conybeare, dean of Llandaff (born 1787)
- 16 August – John Jones, Talysarn, leading non-conformist minister (born 1796)
- 24 November – Sir Henry Havelock, general (born 1795)
- 30 November – Mary Buckland, palaeontologist and marine biologist (born 1797)
- 15 December – Sir George Cayley, aviation pioneer (born 1773)
- 17 December – Sir Francis Beaufort, naval officer and hydrographer (born 1774)
- James Morrison, millionaire retail draper and politician (born 1789)
