= General Duncan (disambiguation) =

Thomas Duncan (general) (1819–1887) was a Union Army brevet brigadier general. General Duncan may also refer to:

- Alastair Duncan (British Army officer) (1952–2016), British Army major general
- Alexander Duncan (army officer) (1780–1859), East India Company general
- George B. Duncan (1861–1950), U.S. Army major general
- John Duncan (British Army officer, born 1870) (1870–1960), British Army major general
- John Duncan (British Army officer, born 1872) (1872–1948), British Army major general
- Johnson K. Duncan (1827–1862), Confederate States Army brigadier general
