= Scriptural geologist =

19th-century biblical literalist writers

Scriptural geologists (or Mosaic geologists) were a heterogeneous group of writers in the early nineteenth century, who claimed "the primacy of literalistic biblical exegesis" and a short Young Earth time-scale. Their views were marginalised and ignored by the scientific community of their time. They "had much the same relationship to 'philosophical' (or scientific) geologists as their indirect descendants, the twentieth-century creationists." Paul Wood describes them as "mostly Anglican evangelicals" with "no institutional focus and little sense of commonality". They generally lacked any background in geology, and had little influence even in church circles.

== Background ==
=== Reason for appearance ===
Up until the end of the 18th century Classical British scholarship was theologically based, using the Bible as a basic source for world history and chronology. Early work in the developing science of geology sought "theories of the Earth" combining mechanical physical laws in the natural philosophy of René Descartes with belief in the global flood as described in Genesis 6-8. The flood narrative in Genesis was given serious consideration as a basis for explaining geological data, and though by 1800 naturalists accepted an old-earth cosmology, this was not an inevitable conclusion among the educated. Amateur and popular geologists continued to use scripture centred geology well into the 19th century.

In the 18th century, geologists became convinced that an immense time had been needed to build up the huge thickness of rock strata visible in quarries and cliffs, implying extensive pre-human periods. The concept of Neptunism taught by Abraham Gottlob Werner proposed that rock strata had been deposited from a primeval global ocean rather than by Noah's Flood. Opposing this, James Hutton proposed an indefinitely old cycle of eroded rocks being deposited in the sea, consolidated and heaved up by volcanic forces into mountains which in turn eroded, all in natural processes which continue to operate. By 1807 when the Geological Society of London was founded as the first professional geological society, most of its members accepted a basic geologic time scale, and researchers including William Smith had found that strata could be identified by characteristic fossils.

Theologians sought to reconcile scripture, the book of God's word, with natural history, the book of God's works. Thomas Chalmers (a minister of the Scottish Kirk) popularised Gap creationism (or "interval" theory), a form of old Earth creationism that posits that the six-day creation as described in the Book of Genesis involved literal 24-hour days, but that there was a gap of time between two distinct creations in the first and the second verses of Genesis, explaining many scientific observations, including the age of the Earth. Chalmers' suggestion was supported by theological liberals, what Milton Millhauser referred to as the party of "reconciliation," such as Edward Hitchcock, W. D. Conybeare, and the future Cardinal Wiseman. Sharon Turner included it in his children's book A Sacred History of the World. Millhauser wrote that "Its prestige was such that the "interval" theory presently became almost the official British rival to the continental one that interpreted the Six Days as six creative eras", adding his subjective estimate that "until about 1850, the casual pulpit or periodical assurance that geology does not conflict with revelation was based, in possibly seven instances out of ten, on Chalmers' "interval" theory."

The research of Georges Cuvier indicated "repeated irruptions and retreats of the sea" which he identified with a long series of sudden catastrophes which had caused extinctions: when this was translated into English in 1813, Robert Jameson added suggestions that the last catastrophe was the biblical Deluge. The Church of England clergyman William Buckland became the foremost proponent of Flood geology, proposing in 1819 that certain surface features were evidence of violent flooding during the Deluge as the last of a series of catastrophes.

Historian of Religion Arthur McCalla considers that "All geological work that was taken seriously by experts took for granted the reality of deep time" and that scriptural geologists were not given "the slightest credence" by working geologists. Ralph O'Connor, a history professor at the University of Aberdeen, considers McCalla's views to be an "overstatement", and states that "the 'orthodoxy' of an old-earth cosmology was not there for the taking; it had to be painstakingly constructed, using various performance strategies designed to persuade the literate classes that the new school of geology trumped biblical exegesis in questions about earth history."

The British scriptural geologists' writings came in two waves. The first, in the 1820s, was in response to 'gap theory' and included Granville Penn's A Comparative Estimate of the Mineral and Mosaical Geologies (1822) and George Bugg's Scriptural Geology (1826). Realizing that the majority opinion was slipping away from scriptural geology, their zeal increased. While the period from 1815 to 1830 represents the incubation of the movement, 1830 to 1844 marks its most intense and significant activity. This was largely in response to Charles Lyell's Principles of Geology and Buckland's Bridgewater Treatise, Geology and Mineralogy considered with reference to Natural Theology, which retracted his earlier ideas that flood geology had found evidence of a universal flood. Responses included George Fairholme's General View of the Geology of Scripture (1833) and The Mosaic Deluge (1837).

O'Connor wrote of the times that, "Although secularization in various forms was on the ascendant among the upper and upper-middle classes, the Bible was still the most important book in early nineteenth-century British cultural life. Although liberalizing churchmen were busily instructing people that the Bible was not intended to teach facts about the natural world, the text of Genesis 1 appeared on the face of it to suggest otherwise, with its bald statements of what had been created when. For all but a growing minority, the Bible remained a vital touchstone for speculation about the natural world; conversely, any thoughtful reading of the first few chapters of Genesis necessarily involved reflections about the natural world."

=== Geological competence ===
Professor of intellectual history David N. Livingstone states that scriptural geologists "were not, as it turns out, geologists at all", concluding that "while it may be proper to speak of Scriptural Geology, it is not really accurate to speak of Scriptural Geologists." L. Piccardi and W. Bruce Masse state that "[a]part from George Young, none of these scriptural geologists had any geological competence". David Clifford states that they were "not themselves geologists" but rather "keen but biased amateurs" and that one of them, James Mellor Brown, "felt that no scientific expertise was required when examining scientific matters." Taking a more positive view, Milton Millhauser states that the leaders of the party were "by no means ignorant of the science [they] assailed."

O'Connor argues that terminology in the 21st century is a stumbling-block to modern analysis of geologic competence of the scriptural geologists because science today is understood in the language of Lyell and Charles Darwin rather than that of Penn and Fairholme. Scriptural geologists saw themselves as 'geologists' (in the early 19th-century understanding of the term) and valued geologic fieldwork. For the educated of the early 19th century the Bible was itself valuable evidence. Evidence does not speak for itself, but requires interpretation. A heap of strata, or a line of Hebrew, is interpreted in various ways. To use the words 'geology' or 'science' in the 21st century sense automatically excludes Scriptural geologist perspectives on this debate, and skews the discussion from the start.

They have been described as "genteel laymen ... versed in polite literature; clergymen, linguists, and antiquaries—those, in general, with vested interests in mediating the meaning of books, rather than rocks, in churches and classrooms", although a number of them were involved in fossil collecting or scientific endeavours. However, for the majority, geology was not their main scientific interest, but rather a transient or peripheral concern.

Theologians

Thomas Gisborne

Thomas Gisborne, B.A. in 1780, M.A. in 1783, from St. John's College, Cambridge, became a close friend of William Wilberforce whom he met in college. Gisborne wrote thirteen books, many of which went through numerous printings (two were interpreted into Welsh and German). Two of his books were related to science: Testimony of Natural Theology to Christianity (1818) and Considerations on Modern Theories of Geology (1837).

William Cockburn

William Cockburn, B.A. in 1795, M.A. in 1798, D.D. in 1823, from St. John's College, Cambridge, was not a geologist. Gillispie described "reasonably respectable" William Cockburn, Dean of York, as spouting clerical "fulminations against science in general and all its works", and writing "clerical attacks on geology and uninformed attempts to frame theoretical systems reconciling the geological and scriptural records."

George Bugg

George Bugg, B.A. in 1795 from St. John's College, Cambridge, was ordained deacon in York and became a priest and curate of Dewsbury, near Leeds. Bugg's most significant work was his two-volume Scriptural Geology. Volume I (361 pages) appeared in 1826. Volume II (356 pages) was published in 1827. Although critics would object to associating geology with the Bible as a repetition of the mistakes the church made at the time of Galileo, Bugg held that there was a significant difference. Copernicus could easily reconcile his theory with scripture. But according to Bugg, modern geologists could not harmonize the Bible with their theories without changing the meaning of the scriptures. He contended that "the history of creation has one plain, obvious, and consistent meaning, throughout all the Word of God." There is no hint of any other meaning than the obvious one in the rest of Scripture unless the Biblical authors have misled their readers. Millhouse quotes Bugg saying, "Was ever the word of God laid so deplorably prostrate at the feet of an infant and precocious science!" Wood says the Bugg was "an embittered clergyman who could not find a benefice".

George Young

George Young, B.A. in 1801 from the University of Edinburgh, studied literature and excelled in mathematics and natural philosophy under the tutelage of Professor John Playfair. In 1806 he became the pastor of the Chapel in Cliff Street serving for 42 years until his death. He wrote A Geological Survey of the Yorkshire Coast, (with John Bird in 1822, 2nd ed. 1828) and Scriptural Geology (1838). He was a fossil collector and dealer.

Geologist Martin Simpson described Young's Geological Survey as "in every way worthy of a pupil of the celebrated Playfair" and Piccardi and Masse said that George Young was geologically competent.

Scientists

Andrew Ure

Andrew Ure, M.A. in 1799, M.D. in 1801 in Glasgow, was a scientist and physician. He served briefly as an army surgeon then in 1803 became a member of the Faculty of Physicians and Surgeons in Glasgow as Professor of Natural Philosophy (specializing in chemistry and physics) at the Andersonian Institution (now the University of Strathclyde). He was probably the first consulting chemist in Britain and highly esteemed by contemporary scientists. He wrote A Dictionary of Chemistry (1821), Elements of the Art of Dyeing (1824), and A New System of Geology (1829).

The leading University of Cambridge geologist Adam Sedgwick, a Church of England clergyman, condemned A New System of Geology pulling "it to pieces without mercy" and calling it a "monument of folly". Gillispie chastised Andrew Ure as of the "men of the lunatic fringe" who produced clerical "fulminations against science in general and all its works". Ure was not a cleric.

George Fairholme

George Fairholme was a wealthy banker and landowner, self-taught naturalist. He was not opposed to studying geology; rather, he did battle with the new theories which were, in his view, inconsistent with Scripture and scientific facts. Genesis did not teach science or geology, rather, it offers a true grasp of earth history for geologists to follow. He tried to show from geology and geography that a global flood had molded the continents. The strata, in his view, were connected chiefly with this flood. Charles Gillispie listed Fairholme as among "the lunatic fringe." But Millhauser said he was "by no means ignorant of the science [he] assailed".

John Murray

John Murray was self-taught early in his career, but he eventually obtained M.A. and Ph.D. degrees. While traveling widely to observe geological and archeological sites, he lectured and conducted experimental field research using chemical analysis to study rocks and fossils.

Other

Granville Penn

Granville Penn attended Magdalen College, Oxford and became an assistant chief clerk in the War Department. His major work on geology (1822) was A Comparative Estimate of the Mineral and Mosaical Geologies. Penn made no claim to be a geologist, yet he read the geological literature of his day.

Contemporary Hugh Miller described Granville Penn as one of "the abler and more respectable anti-geologists" and "certainly one of the most extensively informed of his class," but where Penn's view of biblical verses conflicted with Millers own views, Miller labeled Penn's views as "mere idle glosses, ignorantly or surreptitiously introduced into the text by ancient copyists." Gillispie chastised Penn as among "men of the lunatic fringe, ... [who] got out their fantastic geologies and natural histories, a literature which enjoyed surprising vogue, but which is too absurd to disinter". Millhauser said the Penn "had come to suspect it [the new geology] of a tendency toward Lucretian materialism."

== Reception ==
=== By historians of science ===
A number of modern historians have "rounded on scriptural geologists as simplistic fundamentalists who defended an untenable and anti-scientific worldview". Historian of science Charles Gillispie chastised a number of them as "men of the lunatic fringe, like Granville Penn, John Faber, Andrew Ure, and George Fairholme, [who] got out their fantastic geologies and natural histories, a literature which enjoyed surprising vogue, but which is too absurd to disinter". Gillispie describes their views, along with their "reasonably respectable" colleagues (such as Edward Bouverie Pusey and William Cockburn, Dean of York), as clerical "fulminations against science in general and all its works", and listed the works of Cockburn and Fairholme as among "clerical attacks on geology and uninformed attempts to frame theoretical systems reconciling the geological and scriptural records." Martin J. S. Rudwick initially dismissed them as mere 'dogmatic irritants', but later discerned a couple of points of consilience: a concern with time and sequence; and an adoption of the pictorial conventions of some scriptural geologists by the mainstream.

== Bibliography of works ==
- 1820, Rodd, Thomas (Philobiblos), A Defence of the Veracity of Moses
- 1822, Penn, Granville, A Comparative Estimate of the Mineral and Mosaical Geologies
- 1822, Young, George, A Geological Survey of the Yorkshire Coast
- 1826, Bugg, George, Scriptural Geology
- 1829, Ure, Andrew, A New System of Geology
- 1831, Murray, John, The Truth of Revelation (276 pages), 2nd Ed. 1840, (380 Pages)
- 1833, Brown, James Mellor, Reflections on Geology
- 1833, Fairholme, George, General View of the Geology of Scripture
- 1833, Nolan, Frederick, Analogy of Revelation and Science Established
- 1834, Cole, Henry, Popular Geology Subversive of Divine Revelation
- 1836, Gisborne, Thomas, Considerations on the Modern Theory of Geology
- 1837, Fairholme, George, The Mosaic Deluge
- 1838, Cockburn, William, A Letter to Professor Buckland Concerning the Origin of the World
- 1838, Murray, John, Portrait of Geology (214 pages)
- 1838, Rhind, William, Age of the Earth, Considered Geologically and Historically
- 1838, Young, George, Scriptural Geology
- 1839, Cockburn, William, The Bible Defended Against the British Association

== See also ==
- Biblical archaeology
- Biblical literalism
- Flood geology
- Genesis creation narrative
- Young Earth creationism
