= James M. Brown =

James M. Brown may refer to:

- James M. Brown (attorney) (1941–2023), Attorney General of Oregon from 1980 to 1981
- James M. Brown (coach) (1892–1965), American college football, basketball, and baseball coach
- James MacLellan Brown (1886–1967), Scottish architect
- James Mellor Brown (1796–1867), British cleric and scriptural geologist
