= Listed buildings in Darfield, South Yorkshire =

Darfield is a ward in the metropolitan borough of Barnsley, South Yorkshire, England. The ward contains 20 listed buildings that are recorded in the National Heritage List for England. Of these, one is listed at Grade I, the highest of the three grades, and the others are at Grade II, the lowest grade. The ward contains the village of Darfield and the surrounding countryside. Most of the listed buildings are houses and associated structures, farmhouses and farm buildings. The other listed buildings include a church and items in the churchyard, and two mileposts.

== Key ==
Grade	Criteria
I	Particularly important buildings of more than special interest
II	Buildings of national importance and special interest

== Buildings ==
Name and location	Photograph	Date	Notes	Grade
All Saints Church; 53.53377°N 1.36961°W		11th century	The lower part of the tower is from the 12th century, the upper part is from the 15th century, and most of the rest of the church dates from the 14th and 15th centuries. The church is built in sandstone with lead roofs, and consists of a nave with a clerestory, north and south aisles, a south porch, a chancel with north and south chapels and a north vestry, and a west tower. The tower has four stages, a west doorway, a three-light Perpendicular west window, a clock face on the west side, and an embattled parapet with corner pinnacles. The nave and chancel also have embattled parapets, and the east window has five lights.	I
Remains of churchyard cross 53.53361°N 1.36974°W	—	Medieval (probable)	The cross remains in the churchyard of All Saints Church are in sandstone. The cross consists of an older square base with chamfered corners, and a socket holding a later octagonal shaft.	II
Wall, gateway, outbuildings, and chimney, Cranford Hall; 53.54244°N 1.40584°W	—	15th century	Some of the earlier materials have been incorporated into later buildings. These are in sandstone, the former stable having some timber framing with brick infill, and the roofs are in stone slate. The wall, which is coped, encloses three sides of the garden and forecourt, and contains a gateway with a four-centred arch and a hood mould. The two-storey stable block is built into the west wall, and its openings include a three-light mullioned window. By the north wall is a massive offset chimney stack, and there are the remains of another stack.	II
Barn and cowhouse (east), New Hall Farm; 53.54185°N 1.40539°W	—	Early 17th century (probable)	The barn and cowhouse are in sandstone, with quoins, and a Welsh slate roof. They are partly in two storeys, and have five bays. The building contains a doorway with a chamfered and quoined surround and a Tudor arch, and elsewhere are other doorways and slit vents. There is weatherboarding on the gable of the left return.	II
Barn (west), New Hall Farm; 53.54190°N 1.40669°W	—	Early 17th century (probable)	The barn is in sandstone, partly cruck framed, with quoins, and a roof partly in stone slate and partly in corrugated iron. There are five bays, and one storey with a loft at the downhill end. The barn contains cart entries and a cowhouse door. Inside, there are two cruck trusses, and part of a third.	II
Middlewood Hall; 53.53895°N 1.36731°W	—	17th century	A large house that was extensively rebuilt and extended in the 19th century, and later divided. It is in sandstone with a slate roof, and most of the windows are replacement casements. The main range has two storeys at the front and three at the rear, and a front of nine bays. In the middle three bays, the ground floor openings are in round-arched recesses. The window in the left bay and the doorway in the right bay each has an architrave, a pulvinated frieze, a cornice, and consoles, the middle window has a swept architrave and a pediment, and between them is an impost band. Flanking these are two-storey three-bay canted bay windows with hipped roofs. The wing is slightly recessed to the right, and has two storeys and four bays. The first and third bays contain curved first-floor oriel windows on buttresses, with cornices and pierced balustrades. At the rear are remaining mullioned window with hood moulds.	II
Tyers Hall; 53.55046°N 1.40001°W		17th century	Four houses in a row, of separate builds, they are in sandstone with roofs of Welsh slate and stone slate. The left house dates from the 17th century, it has one bay and a rear wing, and next to it is a two-bay house that has been altered. To the right is a tall three-bay house, probably from the 19th century, and on the right is a taller three-bay 19th-century house with a double-depth plan. The windows in the newer houses are sashes, and in the older houses some windows are mullioned.	II
Barn (northwest), Tyers Hall Farm; 53.55021°N 1.39803°W	—	17th century (probable)	The barn is timber framed on a stone plinth, with brickwork above, it is partly roughcast, and has a Welsh slate roof, the left gable coped and with shaped kneelers. There are five timber-framed bays and an added bay, and the barn is mainly in one storey. It contains doorways and a casement window.	II
Tyers Hill; 53.55009°N 1.39830°W	—	Late 17th century	A farmhouse that was altered in the 19th century, it is in sandstone, and has chamfered gable copings, moulded kneelers, and a finial. There are two storeys and attics, a double-depth plan, and the garden and farmyard fronts have twin gables. Most of the windows are mullioned with hood moulds, some are dormers, and the doorways vary.	II
Barn (southwest), Tyers Hall Farm; 53.55024°N 1.40033°W	—	Late 17th century (probable)	The barn is in sandstone with quoins and a Welsh slate roof. There are three bays and one storey. The openings include a cart entrance, and doorways and windows, some of which are blocked.	II
Former Darfield Council Offices; 53.53386°N 1.37288°W		Late 18th century	A house later used for other purposes, it is in sandstone on a plinth, with quoins, a band, a moulded eaves course, and a Welsh slate roof with coped gables and moulded kneelers. There are three storeys, a symmetrical front of five bays, and two two-storey rear wings. The central doorway has an architrave, consoles, and a cornice. The windows in the ground and top floors are sashes, and in the middle floor they are casements.	II
Milepost, Doncaster Road; 53.53805°N 1.37250°W		Late 18th century	The milestone by a wall to the south of Doncaster Road (A635 road) is in sandstone, and consists of a small square pillar with a domed top. It has weathered inscriptions, including pointing fingers and distances.	II
Thornhill House; 53.53396°N 1.37219°W	—	Late 18th century	A house that was extended in the 19th century and later used for other purposes, it is in sandstone, with quoins, a moulded gutter cornice, and a slate roof with coped gables. There are three storeys, a symmetrical front of three bays, a full-width extension at the rear, and a lean-to extension on the right. The central doorway has a porch with projecting quoins, a cornice and a blocking course, and the windows are 20th-century casements.	II
Cranford Hall; 53.54262°N 1.40546°W	—	1787	The house, which was later extended, is in sandstone with quoins, and a stone slate roof. There are two storeys and attics, a main range of three bays, a recessed bay on the left, and a gabled cross-wing at each end. In the centre of the main range is a porch that has a doorway with a Tudor arched lintel, and a hood mould. Elsewhere, there are bay windows, some with two storeys, and some with hipped roofs, and coped gables with kneelers.	II
Middlewood Lodge; 53.53822°N 1.36968°W		c. 1800	The lodge is in sandstone, with quoins, a continuous hood mould above the windows, and embattled parapets. There is a single storey and three bays, the middle bay projecting slightly. In the centre is a porch and a doorway with a chamfered surround and a hood mould. The windows are casements with iron surrounds and diagonal-latticed glazing, and there are blind arrow loops. In the central bay is a bell in a wrought iron frame.	II
2 Vicar Road; 53.53369°N 1.37139°W		1812	A house and a shop on a corner site, later a museum, it is in stuccoed sandstone, with a stone slate roof. There are two storeys and two bays. On the front are two outer doorways, a two-storey curved bay window in the right bay, and casement windows in the left bay. The right return contains a large shop window with a wooden frame, consoles and a cornice, above which is a sash window with a rusticated wedge lintel, and a circular date plaque.	II
Gravestone to Robert Millthorp; 53.53374°N 1.36992°W		c. 1826	The gravestone in the churchyard of All Saints Church is in sandstone. It is a square-headed slab decorated with carved foliage and a central roundel, and has an inscription including verses.	II
Grave of Ebenezer Elliot; 53.53357°N 1.36978°W		c. 1849	The grave in the churchyard of All Saints Church is that of the poet Ebenezer Elliott. It is in sandstone, and has a large inscribed slab with an angled top face on a plinth. The grave is in an enclosure with iron railings.	II
Milepost, Short Link Road; 53.54199°N 1.38903°W		19th century	The milepost on the east side of the road is in sandstone, and consists of a round-headed slab. It is inscribed with the distances to Barnsley and Doncaster.	II
Monument to victims 53.53350°N 1.36884°W		c. 1857	The memorial is in the churchyard of All Saints Church, and is to the memory of those lost in the Lundhill Colliery explosion. It is in sandstone, and consists of a stepped base, a moulded plinth, and a square corniced column surmounted by a tall obelisk. On the column are raised panels carrying inscriptions.	II
