= All Saints Church, Darfield =

Church in Darfield, South Yorkshire, England

All Saints' Church, Darfield
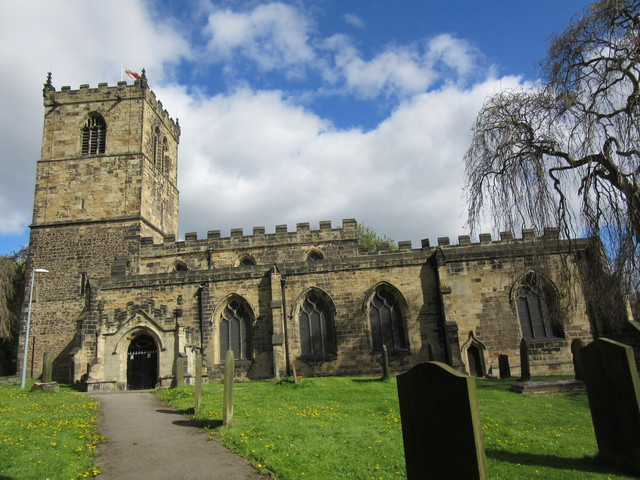
- All Saints' Church, Darfield
- 53.5337°N 1.3697°W
- OS grid reference: SE 41880 04306
- Location: Darfield
- Country: England
- Denomination: Church of England
- Churchmanship: Broad Church

Architecture
- Heritage designation: Grade I
- Designated: 14 October 1964

Administration
- Province: York
- Diocese: Diocese of Sheffield
- Archdeaconry: Doncaster
- Deanery: Wath
- Parish: Darfield

The Church of All Saints is the parish church in the village of Darfield in South Yorkshire, England. It is a Church of England church in the Diocese of Sheffield. The building is Grade I listed and was built in the 11th century AD with additions dating to the 14th and 15th centuries, and restorations taking place in 1849 and 1905. The Corn Law repeal campaigner Ebenezer Elliot is buried in the churchyard which also contains monuments to the victims of the 1857 mining disaster at Lundhill Colliery and the 1886 disaster at Houghton Main Colliery. The 1886 memorial was restored in 2011. Between 1892 and 1934 the rector of All Saints was Canon Alfred Sorby who successfully argued in the High Court of Justice that on Ascension Day children attending a church service should not have to go to school. This ruling was known as the 'Darfield Judgement'.

== See also ==
- Grade I listed buildings in South Yorkshire
- Listed buildings in Darfield, South Yorkshire
