= Old Town Hall, Wombwell =

Municipal building in Wombwell, South Yorkshire, England

Old Town Hall
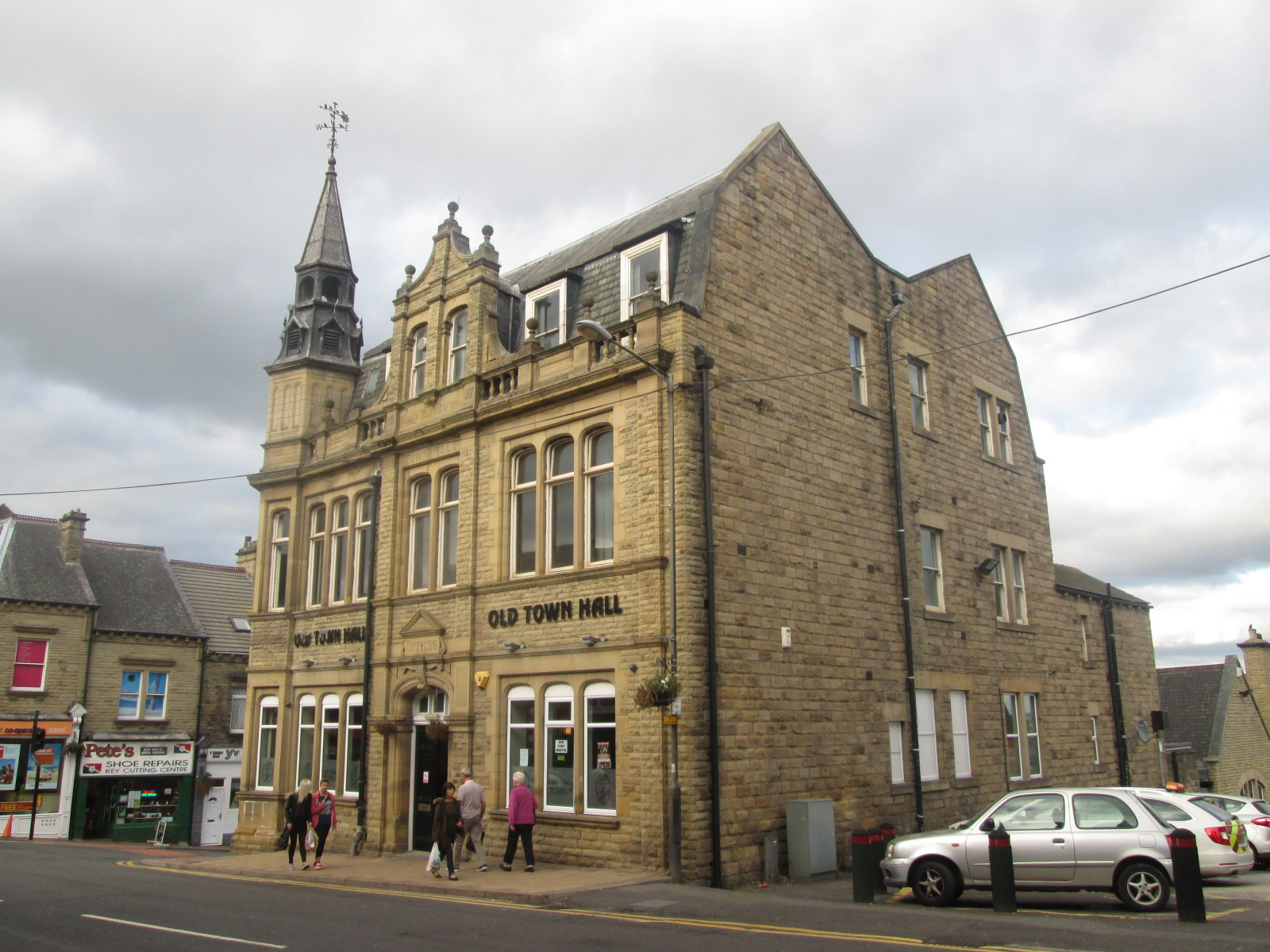
- The public house in 2013

- Shown in South Yorkshire
- 53.5220°N 1.3975°W
- Location: High Street, Wombwell

History
- Built: c. 1900

Site notes
- Architect: John Robinson
- Architectural style: Renaissance style

The Old Town Hall is a former municipal building in the High Street, Wombwell, South Yorkshire, England. The structure, which since 2012 has been used as a public house, is a locally listed building.

== History ==
Following significant population growth, largely associated with the coal mining industry, the Wombwell Local Board was formed in 1865. After the local board was superseded by Wombwell Urban District Council in 1894, the new council quickly set about commissioning a town hall. The site they selected was on the corner of the High Street and Station Road. The foundation stone for the new building was laid by Kate Mitchell, the wife of a mining engineer living at Bolton Hall, on the day of the Diamond Jubilee of Queen Victoria, 22 June 1897.

The building was designed by municipal architect, John Robinson, in the Renaissance style, built in rubble masonry and was completed around 1900. The design involved an asymmetrical main frontage of three bays facing onto the High Street. The central bay contained a segmental headed doorway with a hood mould and a keystone with a pedimented plaque inscribed with the words "offices" above the doorway. There were pairs of bi-partite segmental headed windows on the first floor and at attic level, flanked by full height pilasters and surmounted by a moulded pediment with finials. The outer bays were fenestrated by tri-partite segmental headed windows on both floors and surmounted by a balustraded parapet, with a mansard roof behind. At the corner with Station Road, there was a canted bay with a segmentally headed windows on two floors and a three-stage tower above: the tower contained a quarter-chiming clock (by Potts of Leeds) in the first stage and bell-louvres in the upper stages all surmounted by a square spire and a weather vane.

A memorial plaque to commemorate the lives of local service personnel who had died in the Second Boer War was attached to the north-west side of the building in around 1902. The building served as a recruiting station for young men joining the 13th (1st Barnsley Pals) and 14th (2nd Barnsley Pals) battalions of the York and Lancaster Regiment at the start of the First World War.

The building continued to serve as the town hall for much of the 20th century, but ceased to be the local seat of government when the enlarged Barnsley Metropolitan Borough Council was formed in 1974. It subsequently continued to be used for the delivery of local services until it became surplus to the council's requirements in the early 21st century. In 2011, it was purchased by a local business owner, Steve Harris, who converted it into a public house, with flats above. The public house opened the following year, the occasion being marked by the brewing of Old Town Hall ale at the Acorn Brewery. A toilet block at the south end of the structure was demolished in 2013.
