= Listed buildings in Wombwell =

Wombwell is a ward in the metropolitan borough of Barnsley, South Yorkshire, England. The ward contains four listed buildings that are recorded in the National Heritage List for England. All the listed buildings are designated at Grade II, the lowest of the three grades, which is applied to "buildings of national importance and special interest". The ward contains the town of Wombwell, and the listed buildings are a church, two cemetery chapels and a war memorial plaque.

== Buildings ==
Name and location	Photograph	Date	Notes
Northern chapel, Wombwell Cemetery; 53.52360°N 1.40412°W	—	c. 1868	The chapel, later used as a store, is in sandstone with polychromatic dressings and a Welsh slate roof. It is in High Victorian Gothic style, and consists of a single cell with a spire. The doorway has a pointed head, a moulded surround and colonnettes, and above it is a circular window. The spire has a square base with buttresses, and rises to an octagonal turret with slit windows, carved bands, and lucarnes.
Southern chapel, Wombwell Cemetery; 53.52340°N 1.40430°W		c. 1868	The former chapel is in sandstone with polychromatic dressings and is without a roof. It is in High Victorian Gothic style, and consists of a single cell with a spire. The doorway has a pointed head, a moulded surround and colonnettes, and above it is a circular window. The spire has a square base with buttresses, and rises to an octagonal turret with slit windows, carved bands, and lucarnes.
St Mary's Church; 53.52125°N 1.39754°W		1896–98	The earliest part of the church is the nave, the chancel was added in 1903–04, the tower in 1913–14, and its parapet in about 1960. The church is built in sandstone with dressings in sandstone and limestone, and a tile roof, and is in Perpendicular style. The church consists of a nave with a clerestory, north and south aisles, an embattled south porch, a chancel with a south vestry and a north organ chamber, and a west tower. The tower has a north porch, angle buttresses, a stair turret on the southeast, a four-light west window, and a parapet with pinnacles. There is a bellcote with two octagonal turrets on the junction of the nave and the chancel.
Boer War memorial plaque 53.52199°N 1.39755°W	—	1903	The plaque is set in the north wall of the former town hall, and commemorates those who served in the Boer War. In the centre is a tablet, probably in granite, with an inscription and the names of those who served. The surround is in sandstone and, flanking the tablet, are statues of soldiers in battledress, and flags. Under it are corbels carved with lions' heads and Yorkshire roses and an inscription. At the top is an ogee-shaped panel carved with a unicorn and foliage, surmounted by a crown.
