= Upperwood Academy =

Location
- Dartree Walk; Darfield; Barnsley, South Yorkshire, S73 9NL; England; 53.53815°N 1.38754°W

Information
- Type: Academy
- Established: 1973
- Department for Education URN: 138615 Tables
- Ofsted: Reports
- Chair: Dr Carol Booth
- Headteacher: Alistair Budd
- Gender: Mixed
- Age: 4 to 11
- Enrolment: 260
- Website: http://www.upperwoodacademy.org/

Upperwood Academy (formerly Darfield Upperwood Primary School and Darfield Upperwood Academy) is a 4–11 primary school with academy status located in Darfield, Barnsley, England. First opened on 5 November 1973, it is situated in an old mining community with changing patterns of employment. Most of the around 260 pupils are White British with a small number of settled Gypsy/Roma pupils on the roll. Its absence rate of 3.6% is notably better than the national average of 5.3%. Barnsley Metropolitan Borough Council described it as "a good school with a number of outstanding features".

== Award ==
Upperwood is a Beacon School. Beacon schools are schools which have been identified as amongst the best performing in the UK and represent examples of successful practice which are to be brought to the attention of the rest of the education service.

== Academic standards ==
This is a particularly well performing school with academic standards that are not only high but steadily improving.

In the Ofsted report, published in November 2006, the school was rated Good, point 2 on a four-point scale, with the following aspects being assessed as Outstanding:

- How well does the school work in partnership with others to promote learners' well-being?
- The quality and standards in the Foundation Stage

The performance in English, Mathematics and Science are all above the national average but, notably, the trend has been above the national average for the last four-year and well above for the last three.

== Hansard ==
The School was complimented in the House of Commons on 16 December 2002 by The Minister for School Standards, David Miliband, who said "I know from my research for the debate that there is already a beacon school in Barnsley, Darfield Upperwood primary, whose outstanding performance has delivered a better education not just for its own pupils, but for other pupils in the area.".

== Financial controversy ==
In March 2007 it was revealed by the Yorkshire Post that a special investigation by council auditors into the accounts at the school raised questions about the way it was using public money. Trips to Australia and Austria, stays in expensive hotels and the purchase of clothes for staff were among the items investigated. Though the Local Education Authority was happy that Mr Smith's motivation had been "totally genuine" and his intentions were "totally honourable", there was a request from the National Union of Teachers for a full independent inquiry. A full investigation was undertaken by the GTP and the concluded that there had been no wrongdoing and that there was no case to answer. Following the Ofsed inspection of December 2006, the HMI leading the inspection wrote in his letter to the pupils praising the way in which the Head Teacher spent the school's budget.

== Sport ==
In 2003 the School reached the finals of the Birmingham FA's annual Girls Football Festival.
