= Netherwood Academy =

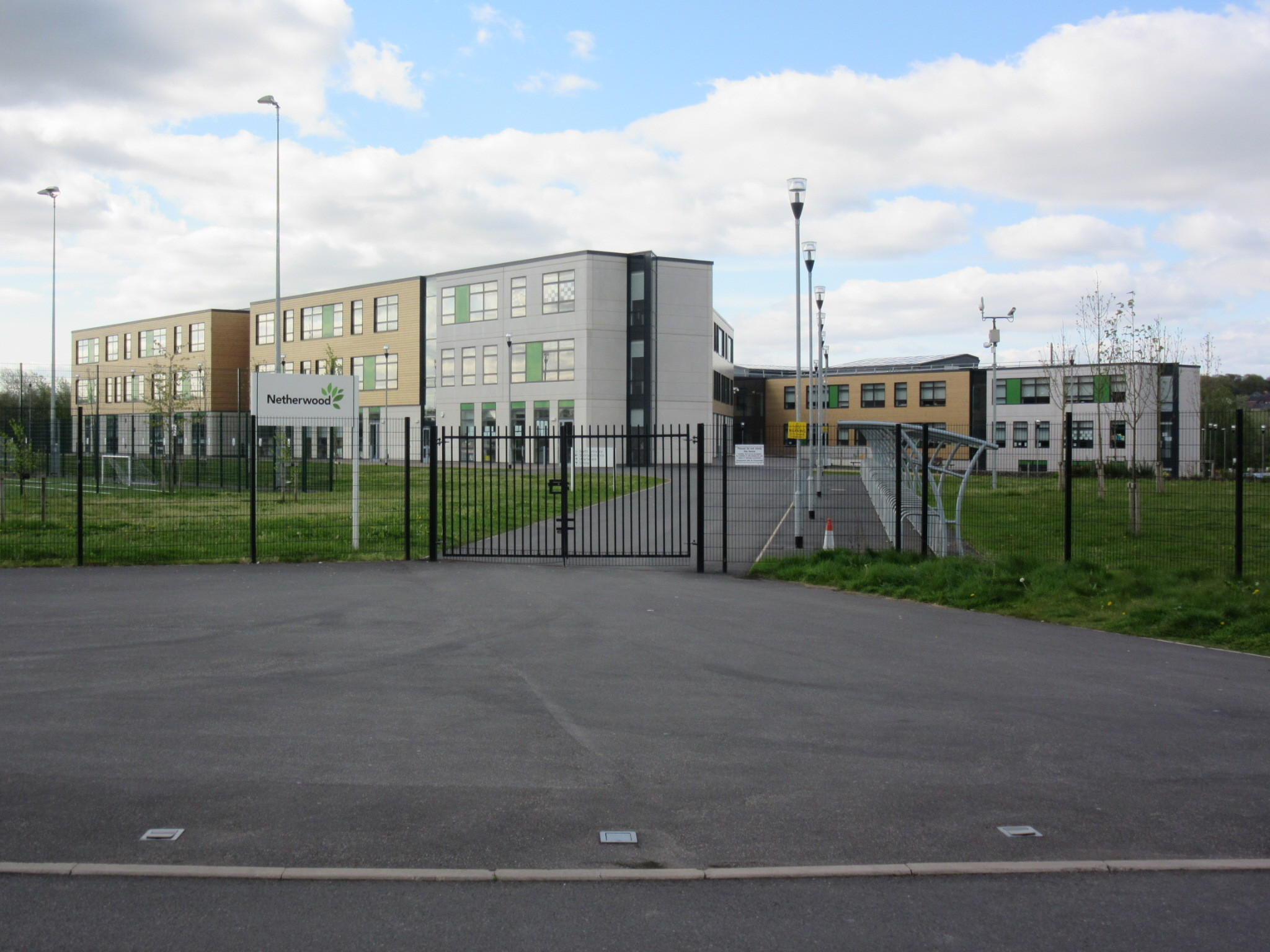

Location
- Dove Valley Way; Wombwell, South Yorkshire, S73 8FE; England; 53.53065°N 1.39642°W

Information
- Type: Academy
- Established: 2017
- Local authority: Barnsley
- Trust: Astrea Academy Trust
- Department for Education URN: 143907 Tables
- Ofsted: Reports
- Principal: Andy Downing
- Gender: Mixed
- Age: 11 to 16
- Enrolment: 1186
- Capacity: 1600
- Website: astreanetherwood.org

Netherwood Academy (formerly Netherwood Advanced Learning Centre) is a secondary school located next to Netherwood Country Park, between Wombwell and Darfield in the Metropolitan Borough of Barnsley, South Yorkshire, England.

The school was formed in 2012 from a merger of Wombwell High School and Darfield Foulstone School of Creative Arts. The new school is located on a new campus, which also has facilities for leisure and cultural activities and adult learning to be used by the local community. The school has a £35 million campus, built as part of Barnsley's Building Schools for the Future programme.

On 1 May 2017, the school converted to academy status and is sponsored by the Astrea Academy Trust.

== Notable teachers ==
Teacher Mark Ibbertson and his teenage son Logan were featured in national newspapers, when they took their leisure inflatable dinghy out to rescue stranded residents of Bentley, Doncaster, during the November 2019 floods. They worked through the day rescuing 20 vulnerable people from their flooded homes.
