= Darfield, South Yorkshire =

Village in South Yorkshire, England

Coordinates: 53.538°N 1.3812°W

Darfield
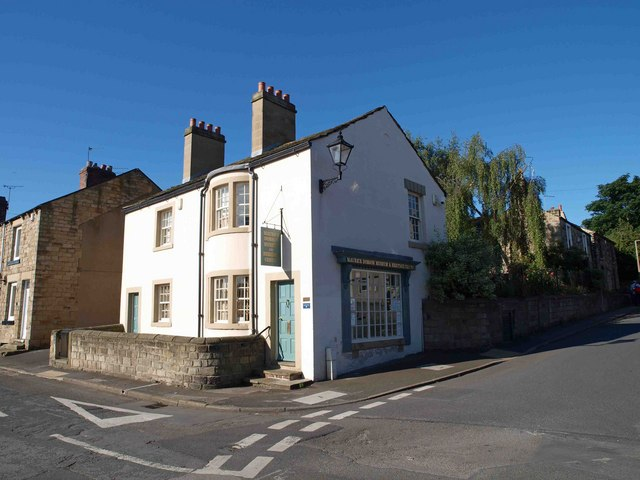
- Darfield museum

- Location within South Yorkshire
- Population: 10,685 (Ward. 2011)
- OS grid reference: SE411048
  - London: 150 mi (240 km) SSE
- Metropolitan borough: Barnsley
- Metropolitan county: South Yorkshire
- Region: Yorkshire and the Humber
- Country: England
- Sovereign state: United Kingdom
- Post town: Barnsley
- Postcode district: S73
- Dialling code: 01226
- Police: South Yorkshire
- Fire: South Yorkshire
- Ambulance: Yorkshire
- UK Parliament: Barnsley South

Darfield is a village within the Metropolitan Borough of Barnsley, South Yorkshire, England. It is historically part of the West Riding of Yorkshire. The village is situated approximately 4 miles (6 km) east from Barnsley town centre. Darfield had a population of 8,066 at the 2001 UK Census, increasing to 10,685 at the 2011 Census.

== History ==
Roman coins have been unearthed in Darfield, and there is evidence to suggest that the village contained Roman habitation during its history.

In Saxon, the name "Feld" describes 'a large area of pasture land' , while the term "Dere" refers to the deer which inhabited the forest. When combined, this gives the name Derefeld which later became Darfield.

There are records of an 8th-century church in Darfield, but when the Domesday Book was written in 1086 there was no mention of it.

Darfield remained an insignificant agricultural village for many centuries to come, until 1862. In that year, two mining companies sank shafts in the Barnsley district to exploit the rich seam of coal running through the area. Darfield Main colliery and Mitchell's Main were local mines, the population of the village quickly increased and it became a labour pool for the surrounding coal mines. By 1901, over 4,000 people lived there compared to just 600 inhabitants in 1851.

Until June 1963, Darfield had a railway station on the Sheffield - Cudworth - Leeds line. The line itself closed in 1988 due to severe mining subsidence.

== Community ==
Darfield shops include a Co-op supermarket, a florist's, baker's, newsagent's, two hairdresser's, garage/MOT station, a post office, greetings card shop, and a hardware & homeware shop. Two village chemists are based inside the local doctors' surgery and on Snape Hill Road. Food outlets include two Indian restaurants (formerly The Bridge Inn and The Station public house) two takeaway cafes, two fish and chip shops, a Chinese takeaway and a pizzeria. Four pubs survive in the village; Cross Keys, Queen Victoria, the Darfield and the Sportsman Inn. There are also two clubs; the Village club and the Conservative club. The cricket club also has a bar.

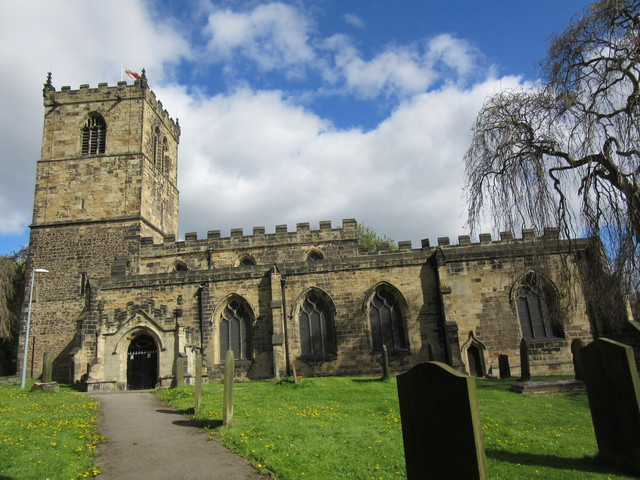
All Saints Church, Darfield

Darfield is the home to the Maurice Dobson museum which is divided into four parts: the main museum, an outlet area where local people can sell their craft items, a cafe/gallery, and a meeting place. There is also an outdoor patio where some larger items are exhibited. The museum's property was donated to the village by Maurice Dobson, after whom the museum is named. There is also a small village public library. Religion is served by an Anglican parish church and two Methodist chapels.

Ebenezer Elliott, the Corn Law Rhymer, is buried in Darfield All Saints churchyard.

== Transport ==
Stagecoach Yorkshire operate bus services every 15 minutes to Barnsley Interchange using the 218, 219, and X19 services during the daytime as well as two buses per hour to Wombwell. Darfield is also served by the express bus service X19 which operates direct to Doncaster Frenchgate Interchange. Also, both Wombwell and Goldthorpe railway stations are within easy reach of Darfield where connections can be made to Sheffield, Meadowhall, Wakefield and Leeds.

== Education ==
Darfield schools include:

- Darfield Upperwood Academy, a 4–11 primary school, opened on 5 November 1973, that educates around 250 pupils. In July 2006 it was reported in the Barnsley Chronicle that a special investigation by council auditors into the school accounts raised questions about the way it was using public money. This received national media coverage when it appeared in the Yorkshire Post in March 2007.
- Outwood Primary Academy Darfield (formerly Darfield Valley Primary School), Snape Hill Road, Darfield.
- All Saints' Academy (formerly Darfield All Saints' Primary School), a Church of England primary school with academy status. Located on School Street, Darfield.
- Netherwood Academy a secondary school formed in September 2012 from a merger between Darfield Foulstone School and Wombwell High School. Darfield Foulstone School of Creative Arts, Nanny Marr Road, Darfield, no longer exists, because it was demolished at the beginning of 2013 following the opening of the Netherwood Advanced Learning Centre.

== Sport ==
Darfield Park Crown Green Bowling Club was established in 1922 by the Miner's welfare scheme. The distinctive original club house and ground still remain on Church Street opposite Darfield Library. The club celebrated its centenary in 2022 and is always looking for new members to strengthen this local asset.

Darfield has a cricket club which plays at Darfield Cricket Ground and a junior football team which is Darfield JFC, they have played on the Longbow playing fields former Darfield Foulstone School Fields for the last 21 years.

The village has had a team play in the FA Cup before - Darfield F.C. Its nearest professional football club is Barnsley F.C., which is based near the centre of the metropolitan borough.

== Notable people ==
- Ian McMillan, poet and broadcaster.
- Brian Key, former MEP for Yorkshire South and former councillor for the ward
- Steve Lancaster. Chemist and one of the Royal Society of Chemistry's 175 Faces of Chemistry.
- Stephanie Peacock, Barnsley MP
- Patrick Murphy artist and designer
- Gordon West, England and Everton goalkeeper
- Clifford Woodhead, footballer
- Scott Doonican, musical comedian and lead singer with The Bar-Steward Sons of Val Doonican

== See also ==
- List of Yorkshire Pits
- Listed buildings in Darfield, South Yorkshire
