= Gattonside House =

Country house in the Scottish Borders

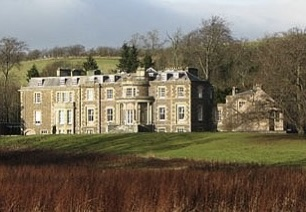
- "A well-detailed early 19th-century Classical villa"
- Interactive map of the Gattonside House area
- 55°36′20″N 2°44′07″W
- Location: Melrose, Scotland

History
- Built: c.1808–1811

Site notes
- Architectural style: Classical

Listed Building – Category B
- Designated: 15 March 1971
- Reference no.: LB15103

Gattonside House, also known as St. Aidan's Care Home, is a 19th-century country house in the parish of Melrose, in the Scottish Borders. As of 2026, it is owned by a development firm which plans to convert the house into apartments, and use its grounds to build new housing.

== History ==
Gattonside House was built c.1808 to 1811, initially as only the five-bay oblong block now at the centre of the building, to the rear of which wings were later added at either side. The house was owned by James Brown (d. 1816), owner of a Jamaican coffee plantation. In 1817, the house was offered for sale with 230 acres (93 ha) of surrounding land. Between 1821 and 1824, the house was occupied by Sir Adam Ferguson, deputy keeper of the regalia. Following this, the house was acquired by retired banker George Bainbridge (c.1788–1839), who in 1824 employed John Smith to enlarge it. (Note: The Borders volume in the Pevsner Buildings of Scotland series states that on acquiring the property, Bainbridge "displaced the previous tenants, Sir Adam and Lady Ferguson".) Bainbridge died at the house in 1839. In 1840, the house was offered for sale, with the option of furnishings at an additional cost, accompanied by 300 acres (120 ha) of surrounding land. The house and land was offered for sale again in 1841, with a specified price of £11,500. (Note: According to the Bank of England inflation calculator, £11,500 in 1841 equates to approximately £1,041,097 in 2026.)

From at least 1845, the house was occupied by General Alexander Duncan. The United Kingdom Census of 1851 gives the house as being occupied by Duncan (70), his wife (67) and two unmarried daughters (35 and 33), as well as seven servants. Duncan died at the house in 1859. From at least 1861, the house was occupied by Robert Maconochie (c.1814–1883), who died there in 1883. In 1884, the house was advertised to be sold at auction with 300 acres (120 ha) of surrounding land on 18 June. From at least 1887, the house was occupied by Lord Fraser, Senior Lord-Ordinary of Edinburgh Court of Session, who died there in 1889. From at least 1891, the house was occupied by Ralph Richardson, who moved from there to Perthshire in 1903. From at least 1907 to around 1912, the house was occupied by Frank Urquhart.

In 1911, an obituary in The Southern Reporter for Henry Mungall (c.1843–1911) stated that he "bought the estate of Gattonside House about 20 years ago, where with his family he usually spent the summer", suggesting that the property was leased to the other tenants during this time. Mungall was Provost of Cowdenbeath and manager of the Fife Coal Company at Cowdenbeath. In 1912, Mungall's executors instructed Messrs E. J. Castiglione and Sons to auction the house with 378 acres (153 ha) of land.

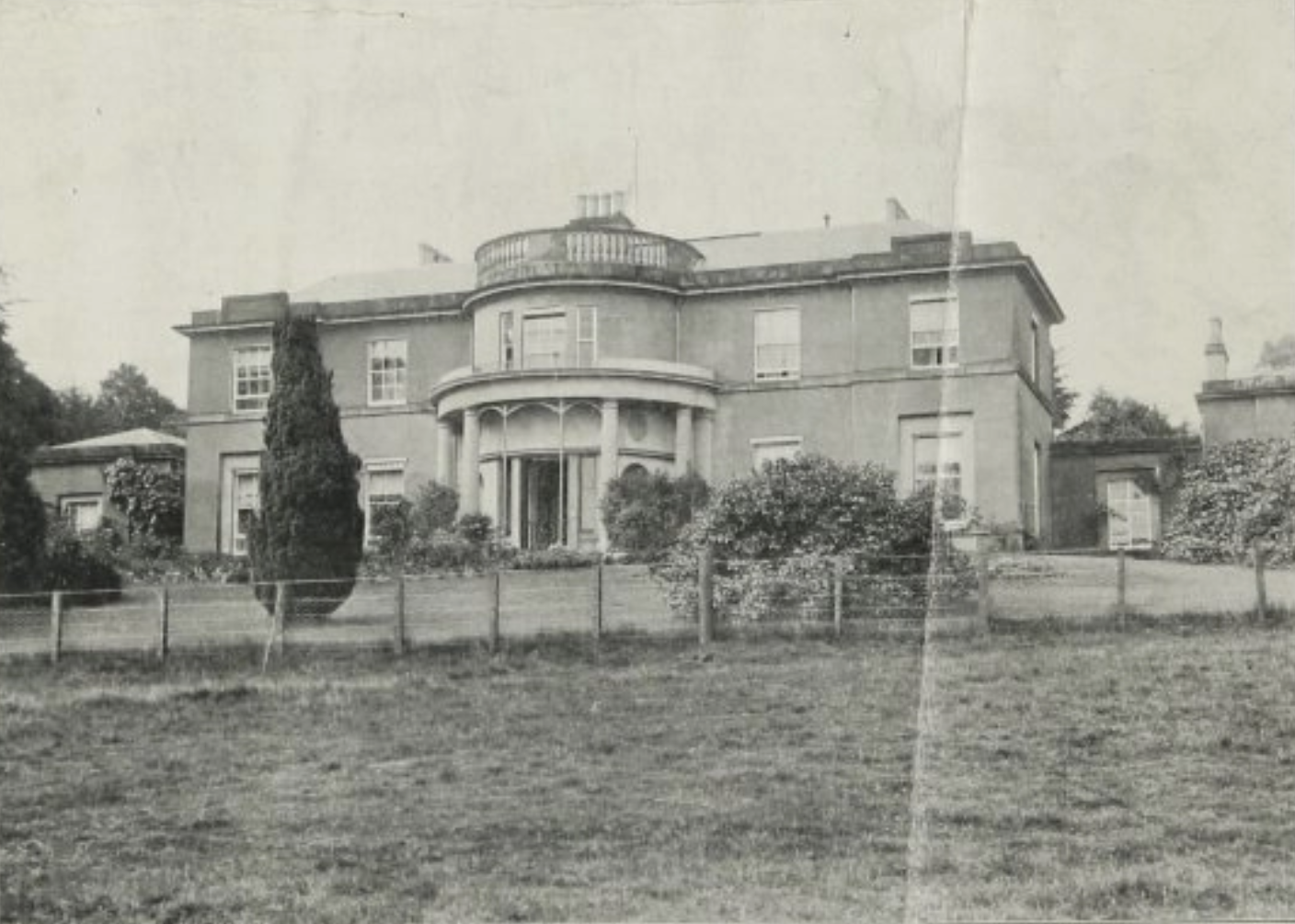
Photograph of the house from the south taken in 1912, before Lorimer's extensions.

The property was then acquired by Edward Ebsworth of Llandough Castle (c.1848–1915), who commissioned Robert Lorimer to make extensions to the house. Ebsworth died at the house in 1915, following which the property was inherited by his daughter and son-in-law, Elizabeth and Captain George Swinton. At various points from 1919 to 1921, Swinton offered the property for let or sale, furnished or unfurnished, by Messrs Curle and Erskine. From July 1921 to 1922, the property was offered for let or sale, furnished or unfurnished, under new agents, Messrs Knight, Frank and Rutley.

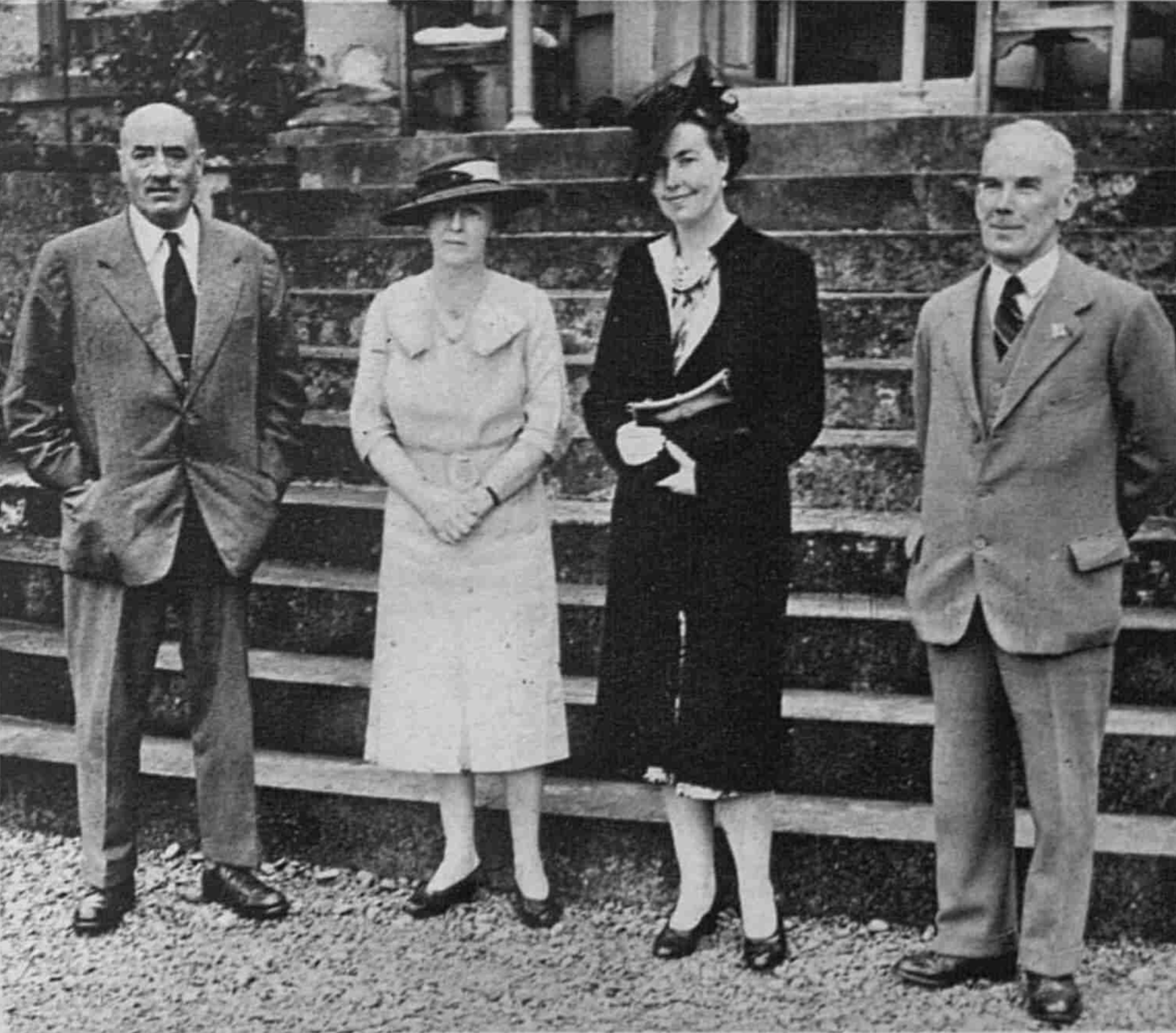
(Left to right), Mr and Mrs Francis Montgomerie, Lady Stratheden, and Provost Aicheson of Melrose outside Gattonside House, at a garden fete in 1944.

From at least 1923, the property was owned by Captain Francis Montgomerie (1887–1950). For a day in July 1934, the Captain's wife, Alice Montgomerie (d. 1951), opened the house gardens to the public in aid of the Scottish Branch of the Queen's Institute of District Nursing. Throughout the remainder of the Montgomeries' tenure of the property, Mrs Montgomerie continued to open the grounds to the public, usually once a year, for fundraising or without cause. In 1947, the Montgomeries' son, Hugh (born 1911), was found dead from gunshot wounds close to the Gattonside Estate. Captain Montgomerie died in 1950, his widow continuing to live at the house until her death in 1951. In June 1952, the contents of the house were auctioned.

From July 1952, the house was occupied by John Morgan and his sister, Avis Gurney (1903–1963). While the Morgans soon left in 1953, a letter to Gurney from her friend, Compton Mackenzie, addressed to the house along with advertisements for applications to domestic positions suggest that they did in fact take up residence.

In 1953, the Brothers of Charity submitted an informal application to Roxburgh County Council "for consent to change the use of Gattonside House to use as an institution for mentally defective youths". From then until 2009, the house was used as St. Aidan's Care Home for the Mentally Handicapped, following which it was unoccupied and fell into a semi-derelict state. In 2019, proposals were made to convert the house into flats, although these never came to fruition. In 2024, it was reported that the roof contained dry rot, and that the theft from it of lead had led to wet rot. The cost of replacing all the lead was estimated at £850,000. At the time, it was suggested that the Brothers of Charity were pursuing a plan of deliberate neglect in order to warrant demolishing the house.

In 2025, the property was bought by Fortis Homes, a development firm, which announced plans to convert the house into apartments, and use its grounds to build new housing. In 2026, plans were submitted to Scottish Borders Council to convert the house into 14 flats and to build 34 houses, a cafe, and a padel court within the grounds. The plans also include demolition of the chapel to the east of the house and grouped with it as a Category B listed building.

== Architecture ==
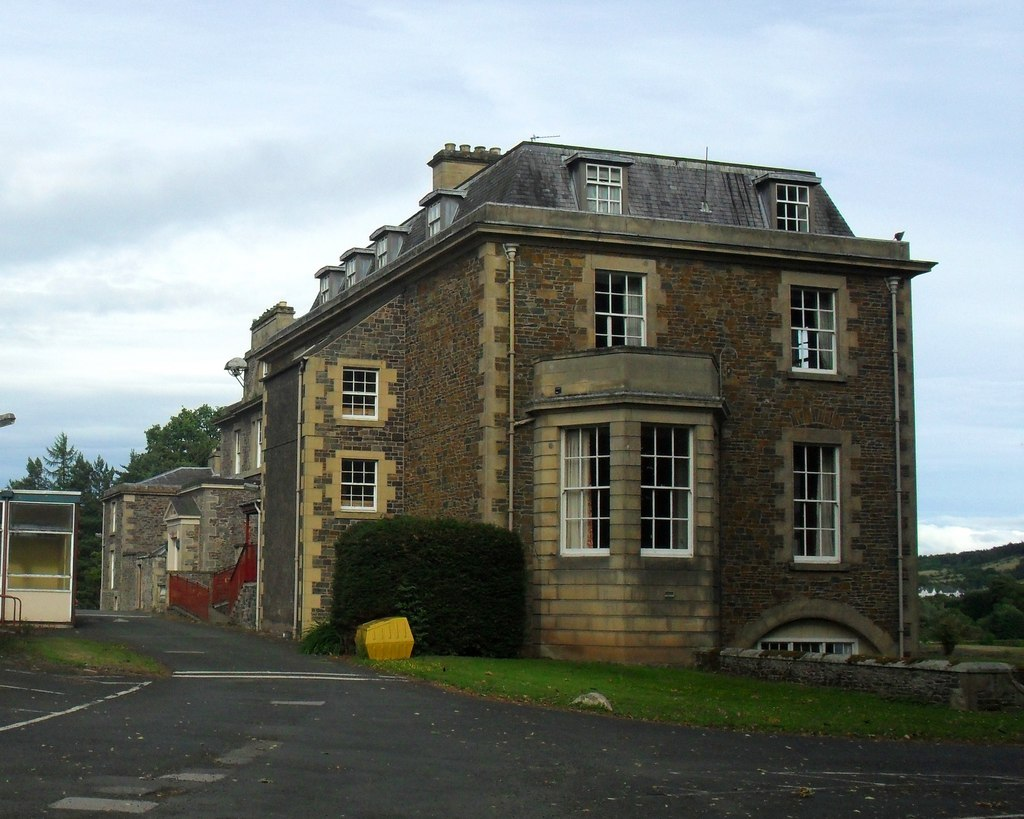
Lorimer's west wing in 2010.

Gattonside House was built c.1808–1811 of Whinstone rubble with cream sandstone dressings, in the Classical style. The initial building consisted only of the five-bay oblong block now at the centre of the building. In 1824, local architect John Smith was commissioned to make alterations to the house, adding two two-storey wings to the north side. Stables and a cottage were built to Smith's designs in 1826. In c.1860, a three-bay entrance block was added to the north side, filling the area between Smith's wings of 1824. In 1913, Robert Lorimer was commissioned to design the west wing of the house, which was completed in 1914, and to remodel Smith's stables of 1826 to accommodate vehicles. During this time, alterations to the gardens were also made. The Borders volume of the Pevsner Buildings of Scotland series states that the chapel to the east of the house was "designed and built with great dedication by Brother Columba Farrelly, over a fifty-year period (1921–1972)". The Historic Environment Scotland report for the property expands on this, stating that Farrelly designed and built the chapel "almost single-handedly". The house was designated as a Category B listed building on 15 March 1971 as "a well-detailed early 19th-century Classical villa".
