= Clifford Woodhead =

English footballer

Cliff Woodhead
Personal information
- Full name: Clifford Woodhead
- Date of birth: 17 August 1908
- Place of birth: Darfield, England
- Date of death: June 1985 (aged 76)
- Height: 5 ft 8 in (1.73 m)
- Position: Full back

Senior career*
Years	Team	Apps	(Gls)
- Dearne Valley Old Boys
- Ardsley Athletic
- Frickley Colliery
- Denaby United
1929–1941	Hull City	323	(0)
- → York City (guest)
1945	Goole Town		
- * Club domestic league appearances and goals

Clifford "Cliff" Woodhead (17 August 1908 – June 1985) was an English professional footballer who played as a full back. He made over 300 appearances for Hull City in the Football League and FA Cup and has been included in various fan best ever Hull City XI teams.

== Playing career ==
Woodhead was born in Darfield, Barnsley and played for a number of local Yorkshire non-league teams including Dearne Valley Old Boys, Ardsley Athletic and Frickley Colliery, before catching the attention of Barnsley and Hull City. He had a trial at Oakwell for Barnsley before signing for Hull City in 1930. During the war he continued to play for Hull City in the wartime competitions and also made guest appearances for York City, whilst serving in the Royal Navy, after the war he played briefly for Goole Town.

== Managerial career ==
Woodhead was appointed trainer at Hull City in 1948, guiding the juniors to the Northern Intermediate League title in 1953.
