= George Bugg =

Anglican deacon (1769–1851)

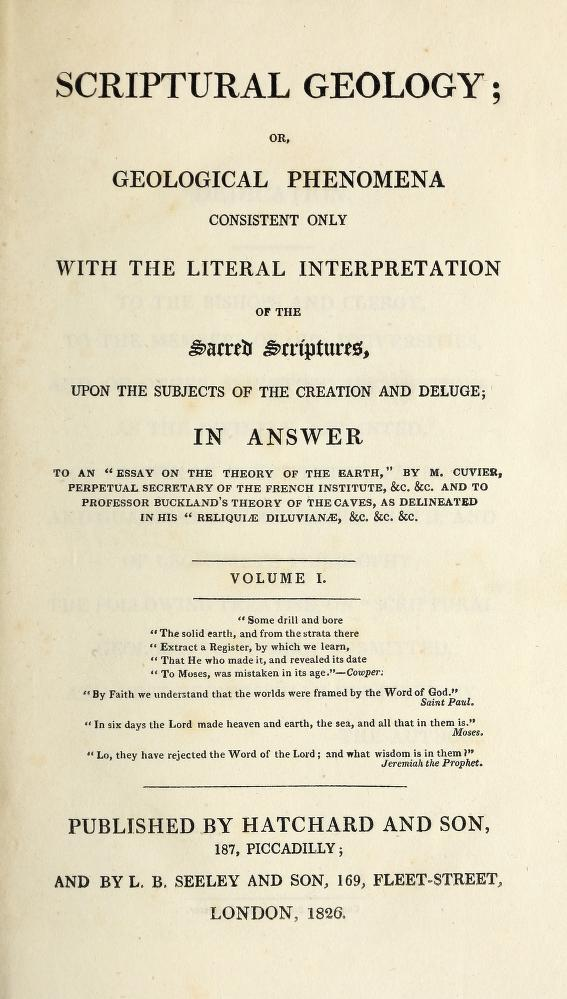
George Bugg's Scriptural Geology, published in 1826

George Bugg (1769–1851) was an Anglican deacon and curate for several churches in England and a scriptural geologist who wrote a two volume book called Scriptural Geology.

== Biography ==
Bugg was baptized in the Anglican church in Stathern, Leicestershire. His mother died when he was only nine. In his late teens or early twenties he converted to Christianity, being convinced that "the scriptures are strictly and literally true". From 1786 he was tutored by Rev. Thomas Baxter and then entered St John's College, Cambridge in 1791, earning his B.A. degree in 1794. Bugg married Mary Ann Adams in 1804, by whom he had four daughters and one son. She died in 1815 after only eleven years of marriage.

In 1816 and 1843 Bugg wrote two books on baptism and regeneration to refute the view of Mant and Pusey. Bugg considered their views to be identical with Roman Catholic teaching and therefore a threat to the doctrine of Justification by faith. This was part of the Tractarian movement in the Anglican Church in the 1830s and 1840s.

Volume one of Bugg's most important work, Scriptural Geology, was published in 1826 and the second volume came out the next year, together they contained more than 717 pages.

During his career he was discharged from three church positions due to complaints from some members. Besides this, several members of his family died in a short time and he was often ill. When he was living with his daughter Elizabeth in Hull, Bugg died on 15 August 1851.

During the 1820s, only some Scriptural geologists held a decidedly antagonistic attitude towards the new geology. But in the 1830s, when old-earth geology was endorsed without reservation as a substitute to the Genesis record, much disagreement arose. The implicit rejection of the Bible's eyewitness account was thought condescending, sidetracking a typical Bible student from gaining a knowledge of nature from the Bible.

== Selected publications ==
- Bugg, George (1826). Scriptural geology, or, Geological phenomena, consistent only with the literal interpretation of the sacred Scriptures. Vol. 1. Hatchard and son.
- Bugg, George (1827). Scriptural geology, or, Geological phenomena, consistent only with the literal interpretation of the sacred Scriptures. Vol. 2. Hatchard and son.
