= John Murray (science lecturer) =

British scientist

- Born: (c. 1786 – 1851)
- Died: (age 65)
- Occupation: Geologist

Academic background
- Education: Professor

John Murray (c. 1786 – 1851) was a British science writer, lecturer, traveller and scriptural geologist during the early years of scientific development.

== Early life and education ==
He was born in Stranraer, Galloway, the son James Murray, sea-captain, and of Grace, his wife. He seemed to develop an interest in science early in life, and in 1815 published Elements of Chemical Science as Applied to Arts and Manufactures.

Beginning in 1816, he gave several sciences lectures a year at the Surrey Institute and Mechanics' Institutes becoming "one of the best lecturers in the world", according to Lord Brougham. He wrote on chemistry, physics, geology, natural history, and medicine.

He was a fellow of the Society of Antiquaries (joined in 1822) and of the Geological Society of London (1823), the Linnean Society of London (1819), and Royal Horticultural Society (1824). Also, the Meteorological society of London, The British Association for the Advancement of Science (1837) and the Mechanics' institutes of Exeter, Davonport, Portsmouth and Bristol. In the 1830s he was a prominent scriptural geologist, promoting a reconciliation between the geologic record and the Genesis creation narrative.

== Later career ==
He travelled extensively, but lived in Hull most of his life. He was a loyal member of the Church of Scotland and a strong Calvinist. He moved back to Stranraer in 1850, but a severe illness drained his health and finances and he died an invalid on 28 June 1851.

== Bibliography ==
- (1815) The Elements of Chemical Science as applied to the arts and manufactures and natural phenomena.
- (1830) A Treatise on Pulmonary Consumption; its prevention and remedy.
- (1831) [1840] The Truth of Revelation, 276 pages; second edition, 380 pages.
- (1838) Portrait of Geology, 214 pages.
