= Alexander Duncan (East India Company officer) =

Scottish army officer

General Alexander Duncan (1780–1859) was a Scottish officer of the East India Company army in Bengal.

== Early life ==
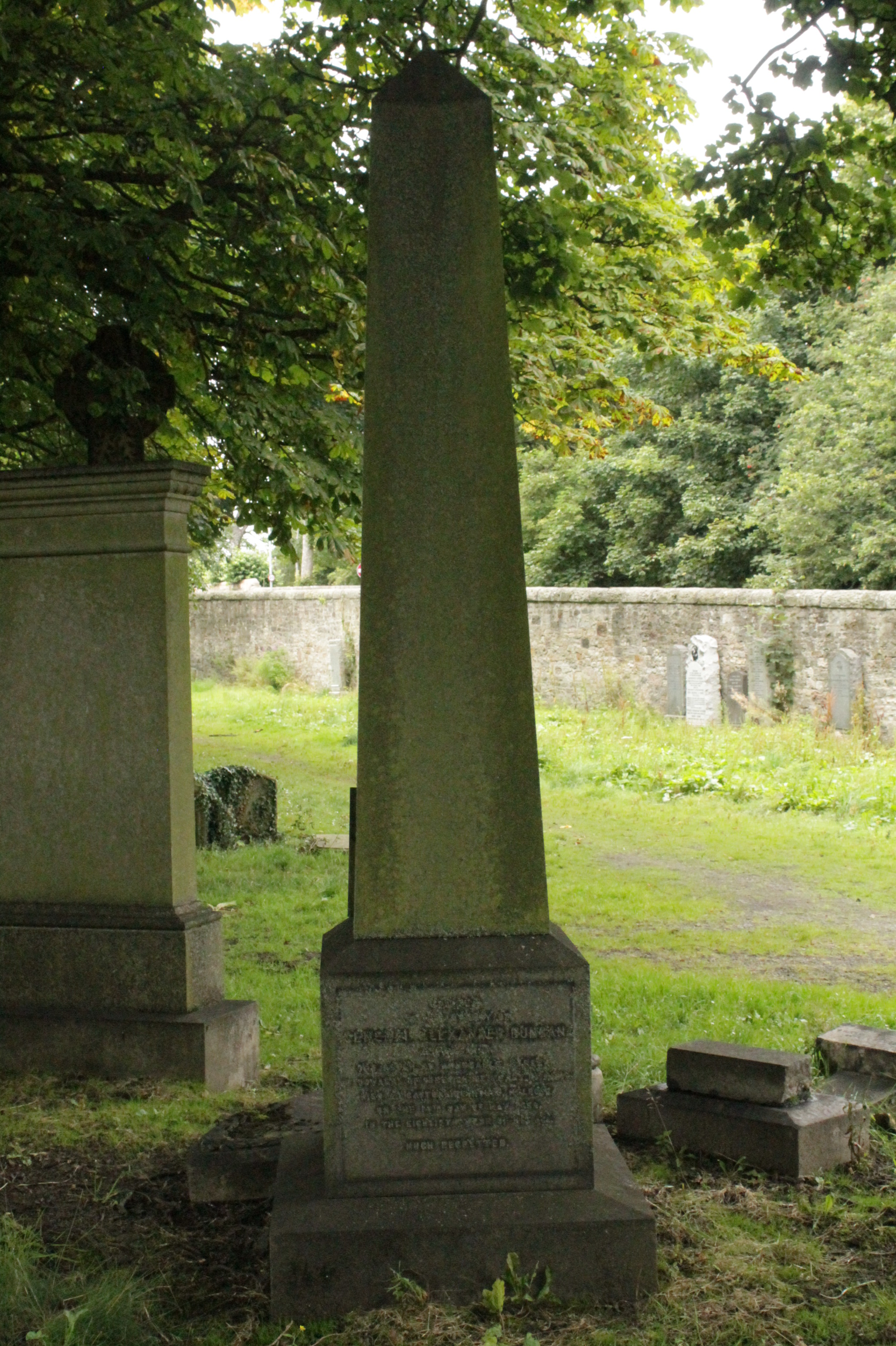
The grave of General Alexander Duncan, Warriston Cemetery

Alexander Duncan was the third son of the physician Andrew Duncan, the elder. The family lived on Bristo Street in Edinburgh's South Side. When his father got the position as Professor of Medicine at Edinburgh University the family moved to Adam Square. Alexander attended the Edinburgh High School a short distance away to the east.

He arrived in India as a cadet in 1795, and served there in the East India Company's forces until 1840, when he returned to the United Kingdom with the rank of Major-General.

=== Military service in India ===
In 1800 Duncan served in Awadh, and then was in the Doab of the Yamuna, in actions at Sasni and Bijai Garh. He took part in the Second Anglo-Maratha War, being present at the Battle of Laswari, and was promoted to captain in 1805.

Duncan was brigade major at Fatehgarh from 1806. In the Bundelkhand Agency, he was on active service at Kalinjar Fort in 1812. He was given command of the 1/2 Bengal Native Infantry in Awadh, in 1815.

During the Third Anglo-Maratha War of 1817–8, Duncan again commanded the Bengal Native Infantry unit. It was attached to the Narbada Field Force, and he was commended for his conduct in the action at Sohagpur (Shahdol) in 1819, by Sir Richard Jenkins, Resident at Nagpur.

In 1824 Duncan was given the command of the 5th Bombay Native Infantry; and in 1828 he was put in charge of the Malwa Field Force, following shortly the command of the 43rd Bengal Native Infantry, and then was promoted to Colonel.

In the early stages of the First Anglo-Afghan War, Duncan was a general commanding one of two divisions of the Army of the Indus, under Sir Henry Fane as Commander-in-Chief; the other divisional commander was Sir Willoughby Cotton. Fane, in poor health, resigned his command at the beginning of 1839, and Sir John Keane took over. As the campaign got under way, Duncan commanded the reserve division at Firozpur. While most of the Army marched through the Bolan Pass, Duncan's division remained behind with the lines of communication troops and the forces in Sindh.

With the end of the Afghan campaign, Duncan's time in India was over.

=== Later life ===
Duncan originally retired to Edinburgh, close to his family, living at 13 Abercromby Place in the Second New town.

Duncan received steps in rank, to Lieutenant-General in 1846, then to full General in 1854. He lived at Gattonside House, near Melrose, in the 1850s, and died there on 14 May 1859. He is buried in Warriston Cemetery in north Edinburgh. The grave lies opposite Alexander Smith near the east gate.

Gattonside House was sold by his son Colonel Duncan, of the 43rd Bengal Native Infantry, to Robert Blair Maconochie.

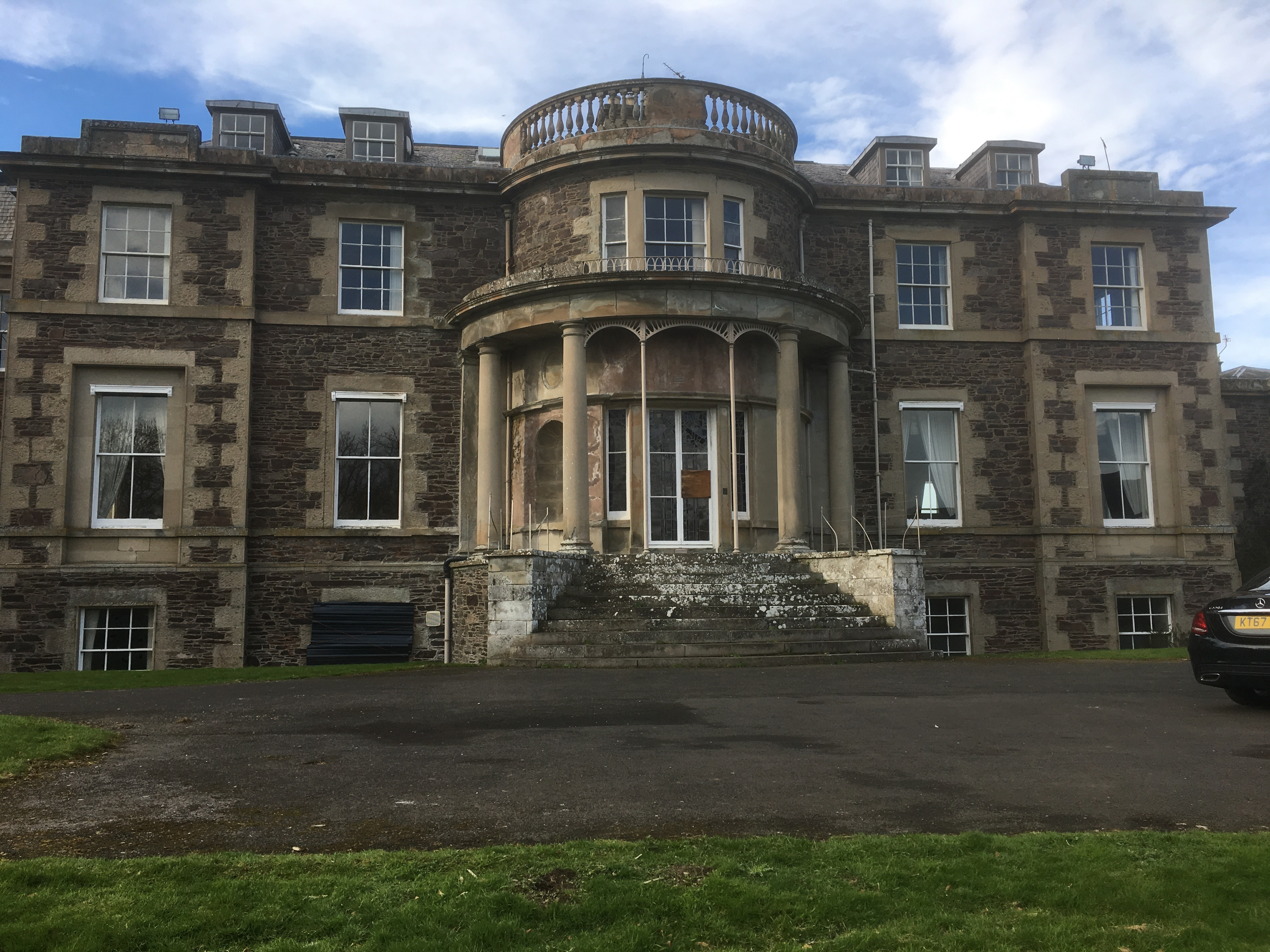
Gattonside House, near Melrose, 2018 photograph

== Family ==
Duncan's wife Mary Mabel died in 1857 at age 79. Charles Rogers stated that they had a family of seven sons and five daughters.

- The eldest daughter Jane Alexandrina (died 1868) married in 1822 Patrick Dudgeon (1798–1846) of East Craig.
- Elizabeth Mary (died 1883), second daughter, married in 1830 Windsor Parker.
- Frances Gertrude, the third daughter, married in 1837 William Erskine Baker.

John Æneas Duncan (died 1857), of the 31st (Huntingdonshire) Regiment of Foot and 29th (Worcestershire) Regiment of Foot, was the fifth son. The youngest son, William Toome Duncan, died in 1837 at age 18.
