= George Fairholme =

British landowner, banker, traveller, and naturalist (1789–1846)

George Fairholme (1789–1846) was a land owner, banker, traveller, naturalist and scriptural geologist, born in Lugate, Midlothian, Scotland on 15 January 1789.

== Biography ==
His father, William Fairholme (mother Elizabeth) made his living from banking and was a serious art collector. Nothing is known of George's childhood years and there is no record of his attending any university. But he was probably tutored at home and self-taught in keeping with his family's wealthy financial situation. In 1800 an uncle bequeathed to him the Greenknowe estate (5000 plus acres) near Gordon, Berwickshire. Like many in his day he used his wealth to pursue his study of geology both in Britain and in Europe.

On 15 November 1818 he married Caroline Forbes, who was the eldest daughter of the eighteenth Lord Forbes and granddaughter of the sixth Duke of Atholl. They lived in Perth; Greenknowe; Berne, Switzerland; Brussels; Ramsgate, Kent; and many other locations in Europe. They had five children, William, James (a naval officer lost on the Franklin Expedition), George, Charles and Elizabeth Marjory.

George died in November 1846 in Royal Leamington Spa, willing homes, paintings and nearly 3000 pounds to each child.

== Writings ==
During the formative era of geology in the early 1800s, Fairholme wrote two books on geology and published articles on coal, Niagara Falls, and human fossils.

- General View of the Geology of Scripture (1833)
- The Mosaic Deluge (1837).
