= Darfield Foulstone School of Creative Arts =

Darfield Foulstone School Of Creative Arts
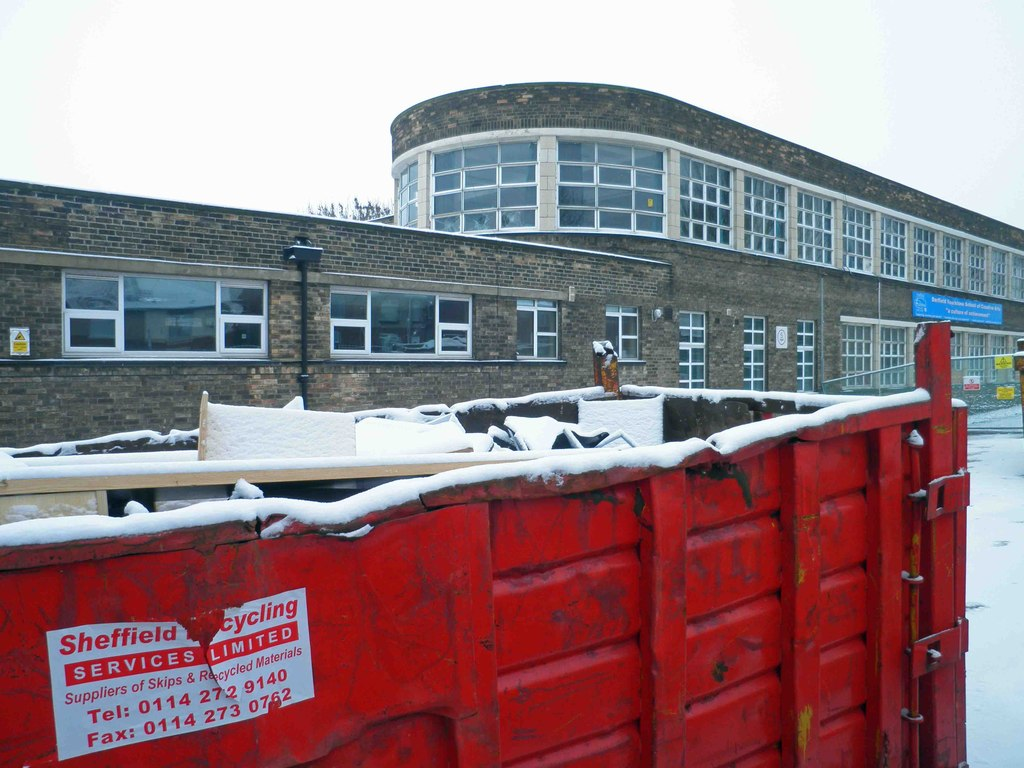
- The school after closure

Location
- Nanny Marr Road; Darfield; Barnsley, South Yorkshire, S73 9AB; England; 53.5348°N 1.3749°W

Information
- Type: Secondary School
- Motto: Positive Foulstone, Moving Forward, Learning Together
- Established: 1933
- Closed: 2012
- Local authority: Barnsley
- Specialist: Creative Arts
- Gender: Mixed

Darfield Foulstone School of Creative Arts was a comprehensive school located in the village of Darfield, Barnsley, South Yorkshire.

It was a specialist creative arts school, with approximately 900 pupils between the ages of 11 and 16 before closure.

== History ==
The Foulstone Modern School was built on land in the centre of Darfield, previously occupied by a children's recreation ground and by well-cultivated allotments, running alongside of Nanny Marr Road. It was built in the late 1930s and officially opened by R. A. (Rab) Butler in the early war years.

The aim of the school was to provide a good standard of secondary education for local children aged 11 to 16. A lot has been written about the standard and quality of secondary education in the 1930s; much appeared to revolve around the "11 plus exam", an examination taken by children aged 10/11 years old.

The school derived its name from Alderman T.H. (Tommy) Foulstone who was Darfield's representative on the West Riding County Council (headquarters at Wakefield); his special interest was education, standards for which he sought to increase at all levels.

The school formally closed in 2012, when it merged with Wombwell High School to form Netherwood Advanced Learning Centre (now Netherwood Academy) on a new site.

== Specialism ==
As part of its creative arts specialism, the school was the host of the Barnsley Youth Theatre. There was also a dance school, "K.A.D.S", run by one of the school's dance teachers.

Adjoining the school was a CLC which had a subsequent auditorium, a professional recording studio, a cyber cafe, a MAC lab, and computer suites.
