= Wombwell =

Town in South Yorkshire, England

Coordinates: 53.516°N 1.400°W

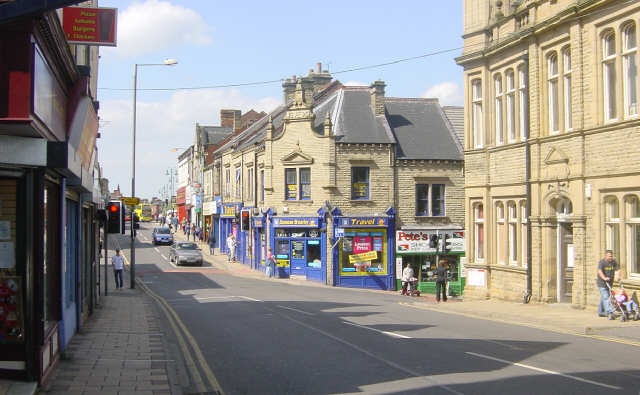
- High Street, Wombwell

- Location within South Yorkshire
- Population: 15,316 (2011)
- OS grid reference: SE399028
- Metropolitan borough: Barnsley
- Metropolitan county: South Yorkshire
- Region: Yorkshire and the Humber
- Country: England
- Sovereign state: United Kingdom
- Post town: BARNSLEY
- Postcode district: S73
- Dialling code: 01226
- Police: South Yorkshire
- Fire: South Yorkshire
- Ambulance: Yorkshire
- UK Parliament: Barnsley South

Wombwell (locally /ˈwʊmwɛl/) is a town in the Metropolitan Borough of Barnsley in South Yorkshire, England. In the 2011 census, data for the town was split between the ward of Wombwell and small sections that fell into the wards of Darfield (specifically the area south of Pitt Street, including Broomhill) and Stairfoot (specifically the area south of Aldham Crescent). Added together, these record the town's population at approximately 15,316.

Historically within the West Riding of Yorkshire, its name may have originally been "Womba's Well", meaning "well in a hollow".

== History ==
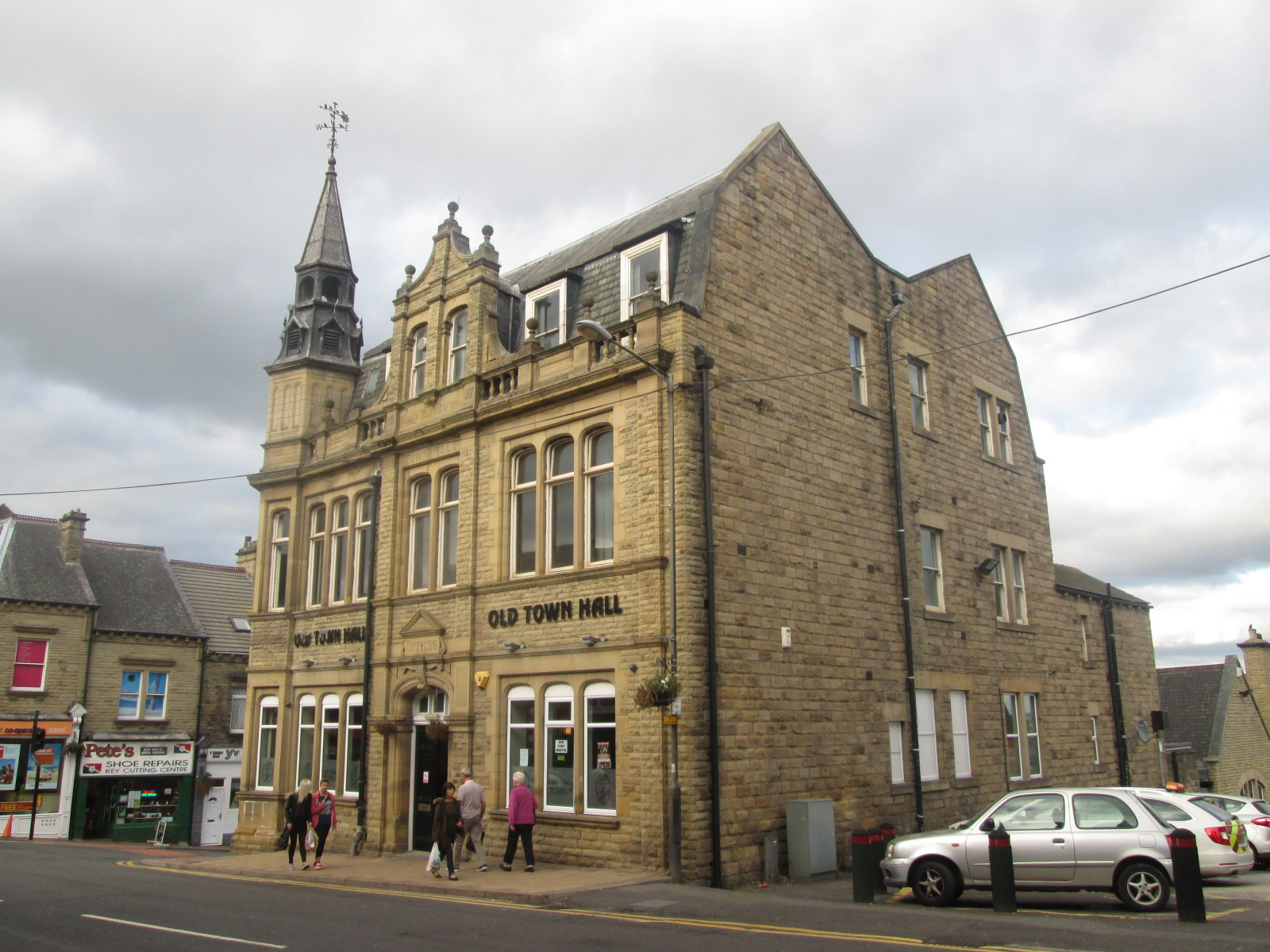
The Old Town Hall, Wombwell

Wombwell railway station (formerly Wombwell West) serves the Penistone and Hallam lines. Until 1959 the town had another station, Wombwell Central, on the Barnsley–Doncaster line; this was closed when the line lost its passenger service. Wombwell was home to two collieries: Wombwell Main and Mitchells Main. Wombwell is close to the large shopping and leisure facilities of Cortonwood, and also has a number of local business, from cafes to travel agents to high-street chains such as Wilko.

Wombwell has one main cemetery, maintained by a voluntary group, the Friends of Wombwell Cemetery. Two chapels stand in the cemetery, both Grade II listed buildings: one was transformed into a "Peace Garden" after a fire that destroyed its roof; the other has been renovated by the group to become a "community hub".

Wombwell Urban District Council was the administrative body for the town from 1865 until 1974. The district also included Broomhill, Brampton, Aldham, Smithley, Lundhill, Jump and Hemingfield.

The Old Town Hall was completed in 1897.

Parts of Wombwell were affected by the 2007 floods in the UK. The River Dove breached its banks on Friday 15 June and then again on Monday 25 June. Many homes and businesses were flooded.

== Churches ==
The parish church, St Mary's, located on Church Street, is a Grade II listed building. The parish also contains the Anglican church of St George, St Michael and All Angels Roman Catholic church, Wombwell Pentecostal Church, a Salvation Army Hall and a Methodist Church.

== Education ==
- Netherwood Academy, established in 2012 from a merger of Wombwell High School and Darfield Foulstone School
- St Michael and All Angels Catholic Primary School, located on Stonyford Road, was established in 1903
- Kings Oak Primary Learning Centre, established in 2007 from a merger of Kings Road Infant School and Oakfield Junior School
- High View Primary Learning Centre, established in 2007 from a merger of Highfields Junior School and Wood View Infant School
- Park Street Primary Learning Centre

== Sport ==
=== Football ===
The town has had a number of football teams –

- Wombwell Town (I) – The first to represent the village in the FA Cup, in 1896. Won the inaugural Yorkshire League in 1899. Dissolved in the 1900s.
- Wombwell Rising Star F.C. – Defunct team who entered the FA Cup just once, in 1904
- Wombwell – Formed in 1920. Played in the Midland League and reached the 1st Round of the FA Cup in 1930, but dissolved in 1934.
- Wombwell Town (II) – Three times Yorkshire League champions, dissolved in 2000. Previously known as Wombwell Athletic, Wombwell & Darfield and Wombwell Sporting Association.
- Wombwell Town F.C. Formed in 2018 and play at the Recreation Ground on Station Road. They compete in the Northern Counties East League.
- Wombwell Main – competing in the Sheffield & Hallamshire County Senior League.

=== Other sports ===
The South Yorkshire Sports Stadium on Station Road existed from 1928 to 1965 and hosted greyhound racing and speedway.

The Wombwell Greyhound Stadium on Hough Lane existed from 1934 to 1972 and hosted greyhound racing. It had previously been a football ground.

== Notable people ==
- William 'Billy' Clarkson (1891–1954), professional football player.
- Harold Godwin (1917–2004), actor, was born in Wombwell.
- Mark Jones, one of the eight Manchester United players who died in the Munich air disaster of 6 February 1958, is buried in Wombwell Cemetery, having been born in Wombwell in 1933.
- Roy Kilner, Yorkshire CCC and England cricketer was born in Wombwell and is buried in Wombwell Cemetery.
- Ernie Shepherd (1919–2001), professional football player and manager.
- Alan Dobie (actor, born 1932)

== See also ==
- Listed buildings in Wombwell
