= Lundhill Colliery explosion =

Coal mining accident in Wombwell, Yorkshire, England

Coordinates: 53°30′55.3″N 1°24′03.1″W

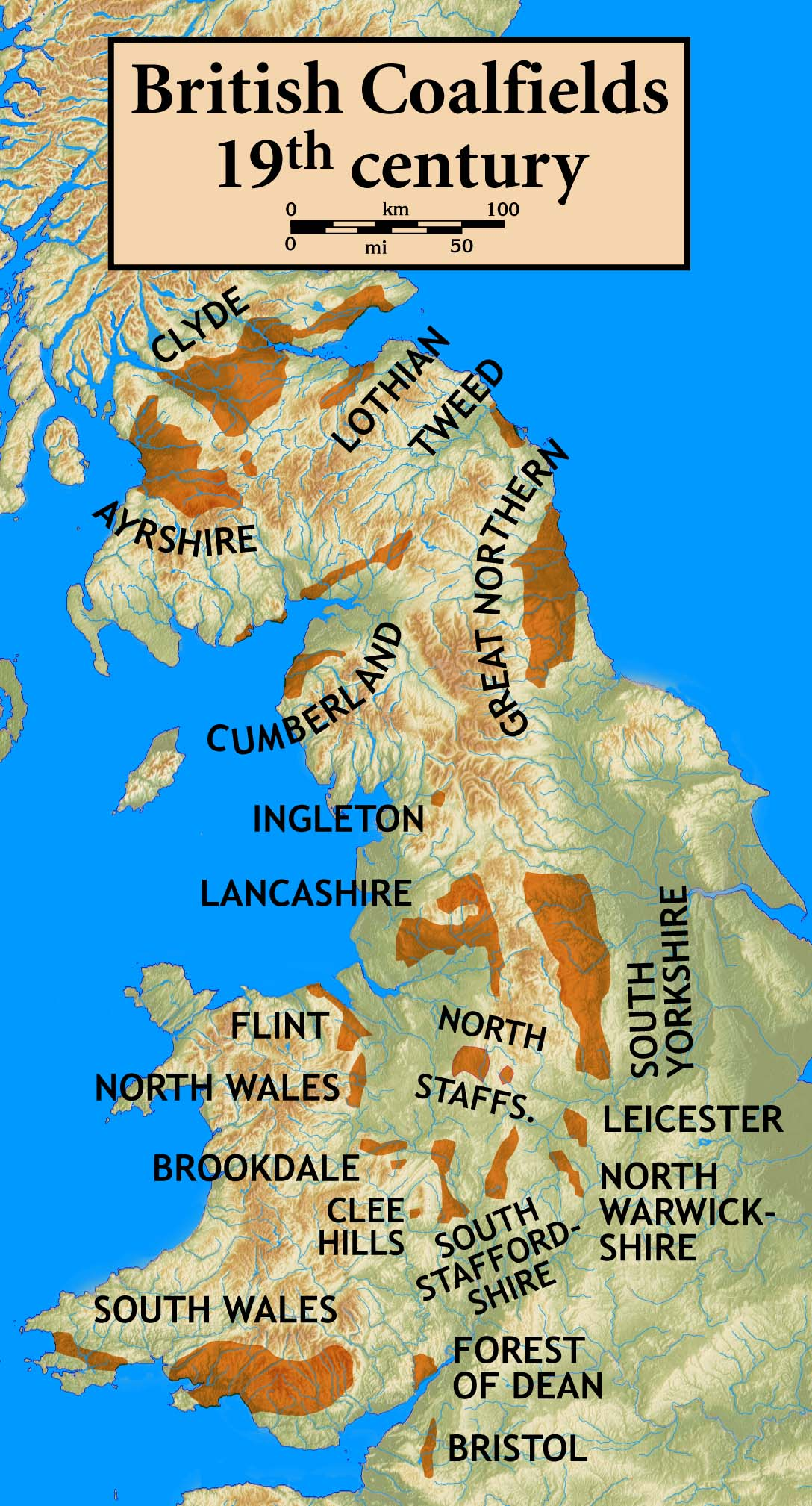
- Coalfields of the United Kingdom in the 19th century.
- Date: 19 February 1857
- Time: 12.20pm
- Location: Wombwell, Yorkshire
- Deaths: 189
- Injuries: 17
- Verdict: underground explosion after a flame ignited firedamp (methane gas)

The Lundhill Colliery explosion was a coal mining accident which took place on 19 February 1857 in Wombwell, Yorkshire, UK in which 189 men and boys aged between 10 and 59 died. It is one of the biggest industrial disasters in the country's history and it was caused by a firedamp explosion. It was the first disaster to appear on the front page of the Illustrated London News.

== Colliery background ==
Wombwell was mainly a farming area with a small population prior to the opening of Lundhill Colliery. The pits however boosted the Wombwell economy and its population and became the hub of local life.

The colliery had quickly become one of the largest and deepest pits in Yorkshire which meant that a lot of people worked at the mine. The colliery company employed roughly 290 men and boys to work in the mine of which two/thirds worked the day shift. The colliery was known to be dangerous to work in. Some of the miners who worked in the Colliery were as young as 10 years old, but most were 18 or older. Most of the employees lived in or near Wombwell, some of them even lived in the shadow of the colliery. Miners worked six days a week and would collect 500 to 600 tons of coal a day. The workers would descend to the mine in a cage and their equipment consisted of safety boots which were mostly too big, a helmet and a little wax candle for lighting.

The colliery had three shafts. The first shaft went down 230 feet (70 m) into the mine and was used to pump out water and for downcast. The second shaft went down 650 feet (198 m) and was used for downcast and coal-drawing. The last shaft went down 640 feet (195 m) and was also used for downcast, but it was also used as a furnace shaft.

== The disaster ==
On the morning of 19 February 1857, around 220 miners ranging from 10 to 59 years old descended the colliery to begin their shifts. At noon, 22 miners exited the mine to have dinner at home while the 200 remaining miners ate their meals in the mine. The men in the mine had barely finished their meals when at around 12.20pm, a violent explosion rocked the mine to its core. The blast sent an enormous sheet of flame up through the pit shaft and illuminated and shook the countryside for miles around. The explosion was so powerful that one of the cages was blown up and out of shaft two. A prodigious amount of smoke, dust and fire arose from shaft three and was visible from miles away.

It is believed that a large number of men were killed instantly by the explosion or by the roof of the mine caving in. The damage to the upper parts of the mine was devastating too; doors were shattered, the roof had collapsed, the furnace and its arches lay in ruins, the stables were on fire and the solid coal in shaft three had ignited and sent masses of burning coals down the side which spread the fire. The biggest danger was that the safety lamps showed combustible gas within a short distance; these gasses were firedamp and afterdamp mixed with the black smoke emerging from the shafts. This meant that there was a serious threat for a second and even bigger explosion.

The mine was now ablaze and despite the serious potential for a second explosion, a group of rescue workers, mostly consisting of volunteers, tried to descend down shaft two. They found 19 scorched and injured survivors. The survivors were successfully extracted, but two of them later died from their burns. The search for more survivors continued, and was stopped at 19.30pm when it was clear that there were no more survivors to be rescued and the blaze was keeping the rescuers from proceeding down the mine. The fire brigade arrived at the scene, but failed to extinguish the flames as a 98 feet (30 m) high column of fire rushed from shaft three. The scene created such interest that huge crowds, estimated at between 10,000 and 15,000 people, arrived at the site to look at the mourners and watch the flames still spiralling out of the pit.

The following morning, it was decided to cap the first and second shaft with planks and clay. This tactic seemed to work as the flames died down, but thick black smoke still arose from the third shaft as it was left open. The decision was made to put out the fire and a nearby stream was diverted to put out the fires by flooding the mine. This, however, made it impossible to recover the bodies until the mine was drained again. Two months after the explosion, on 17 April 1857, the mine was finally drained and the recovery of bodies began. The recovered bodies were all placed in coffins and lined up in the yard to be identify by loved ones. Most of the bodies were badly burned or mutilated and were thereby unrecognizable. By 22 May, 100 bodies had been recovered and the others were being dug out of the collapsed roof. The corpses of horses down the mine were also slowing down the recovery process. The last body was recovered on 16 July 1857. It was later determined that most men died in the explosion, but that a large number of the victims were also killed by suffocation by afterdamp. In total 185 bodies were recovered; the remaining 4 could not be traced. The unidentified bodies were buried in a large grave in Darfield church yard.

== Investigation ==
An investigation was started and a jury interviewed 60 witnesses, including survivors, over a period of three months. It was concluded that the explosion was caused by a number of factors. The mine was not well ventilated, which meant that a gas like firedamp (methane) could have built up over the day without anyone noticing. Many workers had also ignored the safety rules; they would let the safety lamps which were fueled by oil in a closed container open because the oil burned poorly when the lamp was closed. This weak flame was also evidence that the mine was not properly ventilated, as not enough fresh air was coming into the mine. The candles that the workers used also meant that there were open flames in the mine. It is assumed that the bad ventilation built up a high amount of flammable gas and that that gas was ignited by the candles which were used by the workers. The jury concluded that there was not enough evidence to pinpoint the real cause of the explosion, and the explosion was therefore viewed as an accident and not as criminal negligence. They did however condemn the lack of discipline and the non-observance of the special rules, though without blaming the colliery proprietors for the loss of discipline.

== Aftermath ==
The tragedy left 90 women widows and 220 children orphaned. The nation's grief was so intense that a special disaster fund was set up with Queen Victoria and Prince Albert making substantial donations. A memorial obelisk was built in the grounds of nearby Darfield Church, where 146 of the victims were buried. The tragedy also had a positive outcome, as it brought attention to mine safety. As a direct result of the disaster, many collieries improved the safety and working conditions for their employees. The colliery itself stayed in use until the late 1880s, and the site was demolished and cleared in the 1960s.

The location of the pit is now a nine-hole golf course. Another memorial was placed in front of the clubhouse at Hillies golf course on 17 February 2007. The sculpture features mining symbols, and the central feature is a large piece of coal trapped within twisted metal. The memorial serves to remind everyone of the human cost about which early miners and their families were only too aware.
