= George Young (Presbyterian minister) =

George Young (15 July 1777 – 8 May 1848) was a Scottish divine, scholar and flood geologist.

== Biography ==
George Young was born in Kirknewton south-west of Edinburgh to John Young and his wife Jean. George was born without a left hand and this situation led his parents to educate him for the ministry.

At the University of Edinburgh he distinguished himself in mathematics and natural philosophy. He was a favorite student of Professor John Playfair who was, at that time, becoming the great promoter of James Hutton's uniformitarian geology. After receiving high honors upon completion of his degree in 1796, he studied theology under George Lawson at Selkirk for five years, receiving at the end of this period a licence to preach from the Presbytery of Glasgow. In 1806 he became the pastor of the Cliff Street chapel in Whitby where he served for 42 years. He obtained an M.A. degree from the University of Edinburgh in 1819. In 1826 he married Margaret Hunter. Though married for 20 years they had no children.

Young could read and write Hebrew, Greek, Latin, French, and Italian with some acquaintance with Arabic, Chaldean and Syriac, and he developed his own shorthand, which is still undecipherable. He helped establish Whitby Museum as the first secretary and a founding member of the Whitby Literary and Philosophical Society. He procured fossil and mineral collections for the Yorkshire Philosophical Society.

Young wrote twenty-two books on many topics: inter alia, the history of Whitby; the great solar eclipse of 1836; an acclaimed biography of Captain James Cook; the downfall of Napoleon; and, a catalog of hardy garden plants.

With John Bird as artist he wrote A Geological Survey of the Yorkshire Coast in 1822 published in Whitby. This book remains in print in facsimile. A second edition (1828) was printed and published in the north of England, Edinburgh, and London. The second edition contains seventeen plates: numbers one to fifteen, and number seventeen, are on one page, and number sixteen is a two-page spread. The plates are hand-coloured with watercolour: brush-strokes are clearly visible. The effect is exquisite and may reflect Young's passion for geology, and Bird's art.

The title was followed by Scriptural Geology in 1838.

George Young was immersed in fossil collecting and selling. He helped preserve preserving the Yorkshire Philosophical Society and museum. He promoted fossil collecting saying, "The researches of the geologist are far from being unworthy of the Christian, or the philosopher: for, while they enlarge the bounds of our knowledge, and present a wide field for intellectual employment and innocent pleasure, they may serve to conduct us to the glorious Being."

On 8 May 1848, two years after the death of his wife, George Young died of influenza at the age of 71 years.
