= List of Yorkshire Football League clubs =

The following is a list of clubs who played in the Yorkshire Football League.

The league ran at first from 1897/98 to 1898/99, and then from 1920/21 to 1981/82.

== 1st Yorkshire League (1897/98 – 1899/1900) ==
- Barnsley St. Peters (reserves only)
- Bradford
- Dewsbury
- Doncaster Rovers (reserves only)
- Featherstone
- Halifax
- Huddersfield
- Hunslet
- Leeds
- Mexborough
- Ossett
- Sheffield
- Sheffield United (reserves only)
- The Wednesday (reserves only)
- Wombwell Town

== 2nd Yorkshire League (1920/21 – 1981/82) ==
- Acomb
- Altofts West Riding Colliery
- Barnoldswick Town
- Barnsley ('A' team only)
- Barton Town
- Beighton Miners Welfare
- Bentley Victoria Welfare
- Blackburn Welfare
- Bolsover Colliery
- Bradley Rangers
- Bradford City (reserves & 'A' team only)
- Bradford Park Avenue (reserves & 'A' team only)
- Bradford United
- Bridlington Town
- Bridlington Trinity
- Briggs Sports
- British Ropes
- Brodsworth Welfare
- Brook Sports
- Bullcroft Main Colliery
- Castleford & Allerton United
- Castleford Town (first team & reserves)
- Chesterfield ('A' team only)
- Collingham
- Denaby United
- Dewsbury & Savile
- Dinnington Athletic
- Dodworth Miners Welfare
- Doncaster Rovers (reserves & 'A' team only)
- Doncaster United
- Dunscroft Welfare
- East End Park WMC (first team and reserves)
- East Riding Amateurs
- Emley
- Farsley Celtic (first team & reserves)
- Firbeck Main Colliery
- Firth Vickers
- Frecheville Community
- Frickley Colliery (first team & reserves)
- Fryston Colliery Welfare
- Gainsborough Trinity (first team & reserves)
- Garforth Miners
- Goole Town (first team & reserves)
- Grimethorpe Miners Welfare
- Guiseley
- Halifax Town (reserves & 'A' team only)
- Hallam
- Hall Road Rangers
- Hamptons Sports
- Harrogate
- Harrogate Railway Athletic (first team & reserves)
- Harrogate Town (first team & reserves)
- Harworth Colliery Institute
- Hatfield Main
- Heeley Amateurs
- Hook Shipyards
- Houghton Main
- Huddersfield Town ('A' team only)
- Hull Amateurs
- Hull Brunswick
- Hull City ('A' team only)
- International Harvesters
- Keighley Central
- Keighley Town
- Kiveton Park
- Leeds Ashley Road
- Leeds & Carnegie College
- Leeds City
- Leeds Harehills
- Leeds United ('A' team only)
- Lincoln United
- Liversedge
- Maltby Main
- Methley Perseverance
- Mexborough Town (first team & reserves)
- Micklefield Welfare
- Monckton Athletic
- North Ferriby United
- Norton Woodseats
- Ollerton Colliery (first team & reserves)
- Ossett Albion (first team & reserves)
- Ossett Town (first team & reserves)
- BSC Parkgate
- Phoenix Park
- Pickering Town
- Pilkington Recreation
- Pontefract Borough
- Pontefract Collieries
- Rawmarsh Welfare
- Redfearn National Glass
- Retford Town (first team & reserves)
- Rossington Miners Welfare
- Rotherham United ('A' team only)
- Rothwell Athletic
- Rowntrees
- Salts (Saltaire) (first team & reserves)
- Scarborough (reserves only)
- Scarborough Penguins
- Scunthorpe United (reserves only)
- Selby Olympia Cake & Oil
- Selby Town
- Sheffield
- Sheffield Polytechnic
- Sheffield United ('A' team only)
- Sheffield University
- Sheffield Wednesday ('A' team only)
- Slazengers
- South Kirkby Colliery
- St John's College (York)
- Stocksbridge Works
- Swallownest Miners Welfare
- Swillington Miners Welfare
- Tadcaster Albion
- Thackley
- Thorne Colliery
- Upton Colliery
- Wakefield City (first team & reserves)
- Wath Athletic (first team & reserves)
- Winterton Rangers
- Wombwell (first team & reserves)
- Wombwell Sports Association
- Woolley Miners Welfare
- Worksop Town (first team & reserves)
- Worsbrough Bridge Miners Welfare
- York City (reserves & 'A' team only)
- York Railway Institute
- Yorkshire Amateur (first team & reserves)
- Yorkshire Water Authority (Southern)
- York YMCA
