= 1968–69 Yorkshire Football League =

The 1968–69 Yorkshire Football League was the 43rd season in the history of the Yorkshire Football League, a football competition in England.

== Division One ==
Yorkshire Football League Division One
- Season: 1968–69
- Champions: Farsley Celtic
- Relegated: Hamptons Sports; Hull Brunswick; Thorne Colliery
- Matches played: 306
- Goals scored: 1,061 (3.47 per match)

Division One featured 14 clubs which competed in the previous season, along with four new clubs, promoted from Division Two:

- Hamptons Sports
- Lincoln United
- Retford Town reserves
- Thackley

=== League table ===
Pos	Team	Pld	W	D	L	GF	GA	GR	Pts	Qualification or relegation
1	Farsley Celtic	34	21	9	4	60	21	2.857	51	
2	Mexborough Town	34	24	2	8	69	29	2.379	50	
3	Kiveton Park	34	23	4	7	69	35	1.971	50	
4	Selby Town	34	18	12	4	78	44	1.773	48	
5	Bridlington Trinity	34	19	7	8	68	41	1.659	45	
6	Bridlington Town	34	19	6	9	63	42	1.500	44	
7	Wombwell Sporting Association	34	18	6	10	72	39	1.846	42	
8	Denaby United	34	15	3	16	63	49	1.286	33	
9	Thackley	34	12	9	13	41	46	0.891	33	
10	Lincoln United	34	12	8	14	59	55	1.073	32	
11	Hatfield Main	34	12	8	14	53	51	1.039	32	
12	Ossett Albion	34	10	6	18	58	80	0.725	26	
13	Hallam	34	10	6	18	53	84	0.631	26	
14	Retford Town reserves	34	9	5	20	56	74	0.757	23	Resigned from the league
15	Norton Woodseats	34	8	5	21	43	98	0.439	21	
16	Hull Brunswick	34	6	7	21	51	78	0.654	19	Relegated to Division Two
17	Thorne Colliery	34	7	5	22	51	100	0.510	19	Relegated to Division Two
18	Hamptons Sports	34	8	2	24	54	97	0.557	18	Relegated to Division Two

Source: fchd
Rules for classification: 1) points; 2) goal difference; 3) number of goals scored.
The points system until the 1990–91 season: 2 points for a win, 1 point for a draw and 0 points for losing.

=== Map ===
Location of the clubs in the 1968–69 Yorkshire League Division One on a map of Yorkshire and the Humber

== Division Two ==
Yorkshire Football League Division Two
- Season: 1968–69
- Champions: Rawmarsh Welfare
- Promoted: Frecheville Community Association; Heeley Amateurs; Rawmarsh Welfare; Swallownest Miners Welfare
- Matches played: 272
- Goals scored: 1,171 (4.31 per match)

Division Two featured eleven clubs which competed in the previous season, along with seven new clubs.

- Clubs relegated from Division One:
  - Stocksbridge Works
- Plus:
  - Frecheville Community Association, joined from the Sheffield Association League
  - Guiseley, joined from the West Yorkshire League
  - Hall Road Rangers, joined from the West Riding County League

=== League table ===
Pos	Team	Pld	W	D	L	GF	GA	GR	Pts	Qualification or relegation
1	Rawmarsh Welfare	32	23	5	4	110	35	3.143	51	Promoted to Division One
2	Heeley Amateurs	32	21	5	6	81	25	3.240	47	Promoted to Division One
3	Swallownest Miners Welfare	32	21	5	6	101	43	2.349	47	Promoted to Division One
4	Frecheville Community Association	32	21	4	7	83	27	3.074	46	Promoted to Division One
5	Scarborough reserves	32	18	4	10	84	54	1.556	40	
6	Yorkshire Amateur	32	16	3	13	64	68	0.941	35	
7	Guiseley	32	15	4	13	79	74	1.068	34	
8	Harrogate Railway Athletic	32	15	4	13	54	64	0.844	34	
9	Sheffield	32	13	7	12	62	61	1.016	33	
10	Leeds Ashley Road	32	11	10	11	55	65	0.846	32	
11	Brodsworth Miners Welfare	32	11	6	15	68	68	1.000	28	
12	Ossett Town	32	10	7	15	53	72	0.736	27	
13	Stocksbridge Works	32	9	6	17	78	106	0.736	24	
14	Hall Road Rangers	32	7	8	17	68	107	0.636	22	
15	Doncaster United	32	7	2	23	50	96	0.521	16	Resigned from the league
16	Harrogate Town	32	7	2	23	42	85	0.494	16	
17	Micklefield Welfare	32	4	4	24	39	128	0.305	12	Resigned from the league

Source: fchd
Rules for classification: 1) points; 2) goal difference; 3) number of goals scored.
The points system until the 1990–91 season: 2 points for a win, 1 point for a draw and 0 points for losing.

=== Map ===
Location of the clubs in the 1968–69 Yorkshire League Division Two on a map of Yorkshire and the Humber

== League Cup ==
1968–69 Yorkshire Football League League Cup
Tournament details
- Country: England

=== Final ===
Rawmarsh Welfare	1–0	Farsley Celtic
