= List of Welcome to Wrexham episodes =

The following is an episode list for the documentary series Welcome to Wrexham.

== Series overview ==
Season	Episodes	Originally released		
Season	Episodes	First released	Last released	Network
1	18	August 24, 2022	October 12, 2022	FX
2	15	September 12, 2023	November 14, 2023	FX
3	8	May 2, 2024	June 13, 2024	FX
4	8	May 15, 2025	June 26, 2025	FX
5	8	May 14, 2026	June 25, 2026	FXX; Hulu

== Season 1 (2022) ==
No. overall	No. in season	Title	Featured matches	Original release date	U.S. viewers (millions)
1	1	"Dream"	N/A	August 24, 2022	0.319
During the 2020 COVID-19 lockdown, actor Rob McElhenney gets inspired by his Mythic Quest writing colleague Humphrey Ker to purchase Wrexham A.F.C., a Welsh association football team: the team, founded in 1864, has been playing outside the English Football League since 2008. To aid with the purchase, McElhenney enlists fellow actor Ryan Reynolds, and the two formally extend the offer to the club's owners, the Wrexham Supporters Trust. The news of the offer is met with confusion and some ridicule in the media, but the two insist their offer is serious – the offer is eventually voted on, and is accepted with over 90% of the vote.
2	2	"Reality"	Wrexham 4–1 Wealdstone (Note: The episode erroneously refers to the result as 2–1.); Dagenham & Redbridge 1–1 Wrexham	August 24, 2022	0.225
With their ownership now settled, McElhenney and Reynolds – both admittedly clueless about football – bring in an expert to help aid the team: former EFL CEO Shaun Harvey is brought in as an advisor to the board, while Ker becomes executive director. As fans express their discontent with the current state of the club, and players are concerned that the new ownership might be detrimental to their career, Wrexham arrives to the final game of their season against Dagenham & Redbridge: If Wrexham wins, they qualify for the NL playoffs that could result in their promotion. The team, however, goes one goal down, immediately followed by the ejection of Paul Rutherford for an irresponsible tackle. Jordan Ponticelli equalizes in the last minute, but the game ends in a draw, and Wrexham finishes the season in the eighth place, missing out on the playoffs and staying in the fifth tier for the 14th year in a row. As a result, manager Dean Keates and his staff, along with around a dozen players, are dismissed.
3	3	"Rebuilding"	N/A	August 31, 2022	0.232
After the disappointment of the 2020–21 season, the board begins to rebuild the team: Fleur Robinson from Burton Albion is brought in as CEO, and after a search for a new manager, the board sets their sights on Phil Parkinson, a manager who has achieved promotion with various teams three times in his career. Parkinson initially turns down the offer; McElhenney, however, is unsatisfied, and persuades Parkinson personally through a lengthy phone call, who ultimately signs with the club. They also sign Paul Mullin, the top scorer of League Two. The episode also profiles Wrexham fan and single father Shaun Winter, and the club's disability liaison officer Kerry Evans.
4	4	"Home Opener"	Wrexham 1–1 Notts County; Southend United 2–2 Wrexham; Grimsby Town 3–1 Wrexham; Stockport County 2–1 Wrexham	August 31, 2022	0.160
The team begins the crucial 2021–22 season at home against Notts County, which ends with Mullin equalizing for a 1–1 draw. Technical problems immediately arise as it becomes apparent that the pitch, relaid for about £100,000, is falling apart, and needs to be relaid again for double the cost. McElhenney and Reynolds begin a media campaign to bring attention to the team around the world, landing sponsorships with TikTok and Expedia, and raising the profile of the club, directly translating into merchandising sales. Players begin to speculate that Mullin must have been brought in using an exorbitant signing fee, but Mullin insists that his choice was solely based on the fact that playing for Wrexham allows him to be closer to his family and young son. As the team is struggling to find its footing, McElhenney and Reynolds both admit being worried about the future.
5	5	"Fearless"	Wrexham 1–1 Chesterfield	September 7, 2022	0.278
The episode profiles a number of Wrexham fans: Michael "Scoot" Hett is the singer of local band The Declan Swans who is currently struggling through chemotherapy after a cancer diagnosis; Annette Gardner is a volunteer for the club who found solace in the fan community after her husband's death; Sam Halton is a teenage superfan who also plays as a goalkeeper. The team's goalkeepers, Rob Lainton and Christian Dibble, are also profiled, explaining the role of a goalie as the player whose sole mistake can decide a match; Lainton also notes his problem with injuries in the past. In a match against Chesterfield, the team concedes a penalty while one goal down, but the shot is saved by Lainton, and Mullin equalizes in the second half. The episode ends with fans expressing hope about the team, and Scoot being announced he is officially cancer-free.
6	6	"Hamilton!"	N/A	September 7, 2022	0.213
The episode explores the past ownership of the club: When the club is sold to businessmen Alex Hamilton and Mark Guterman in 2004, it becomes apparent that the two treat the club merely as a business asset, and concoct a plan to turn the club's historic stadium, the Racecourse Ground, into real estate; press and fans accuse Hamilton of asset stripping. Fans eventually organize a city-wide protest against Hamilton and pressure him into resigning; the club is then turned over to the Wrexham Supporters Trust, making the club fully fan-owned. While the fans view this positively, and in 2014 the supporters fundraise £127,000 in a day to keep the club from going under, it soon transpires that the Trust does not have the funding or focus to be able to push the club forward, and both the team and the stadium begins an inextricable slide down in quality, with one of the stands, the "Kop", being in such state of disrepair that it can no longer safely host audiences. In the present day, McElhenney and Reynolds attempt to regain ownership of the Racecourse – owned at the time by Wrexham Glyndŵr University – but are increasingly frustrated by the protracted bureaucratic process. In the end, the months-long effort is successful, the club regains the ownership of its stadium, and Harvey presents the chairmen with an architect's rendering of plans for a new, renovated "Kop" stand.
7	7	"Wide World of Wales"	N/A	September 14, 2022	0.242
The episode focuses on the country of Wales itself with allusions and parodies of other television programmes: John Green explains the difference between Wales and the United Kingdom, and the brief history of the country; journalist and Wales native Maxine Hughes hosts a cooking show with McElhenney and Reynolds and teaches them how to make Welsh cakes; the two owners also appear in their own version of SportsCenter with a montage of the team's best plays that year so far, and finally wrap up with their own late-night talk show, hosting singer Charlotte Church, who performs "Men of Harlech".
8	8	"Away We Go"	Maidenhead United 3–2 Wrexham	September 14, 2022	0.142
After spending months watching games from across the Atlantic, McElhenney and Reynolds finally arrive in Wales, to see Wrexham play in person against Maidenhead United; their arrival is met with immediate media attention, but their enthusiasm is soon crushed when the team goes two goals down and Bryce Hosannah is sent off; while the team equalizes with a man down, Maidenhead still wins after Josh Kelly's 75th-minute goal. After the game, McElhenney and Reynolds both admit to each other that they were not prepared for how emotionally taxing being present at a game is. The episode also looks into the culture of football fans travelling for away games, and profiles defender Aaron Hayden and team bus driver Mark Vaughn.
9	9	"Welcome Home"	Wrexham 1–1 Torquay United	September 21, 2022	0.203
McElhenney and Reynolds finally arrive in Wrexham: after an emotional visit to the Racecourse, they visit the town and find it flooded by fans, visit St Giles' Church, view the newly created powerchair club's practice, and end the first day with drinks with the fans at Turf Hotel; during the day they are met with appreciation and enthusiasm, but fans also give them an unvarnished expectation that the team should do well soon, because it hasn't so far – former president Spencer Harris advises them to keep a personal touch, while being unafraid to make changes to the club. The next day, they meet with Harvey and Parkinson to discuss their approach to the next transfer window and how they should budget for it; they then hold a press conference at the Racecourse for journalists, and visit the team during one of their training sessions. As they finally meet the players, with McElhenney jumping in to join them for a few exercises, both Parkinson and the players express that finally meeting the owners face-to-face and finding how they easy they are to get along with gave them a boost in motivation. As the team prepares to the home game against Torquay United, however, Harvey brings bad news: The league reviewed the red card at the Maidenhead game, and concluded that in fact Paul Mullin should have been sent off – Hosannah is exonerated, but Mullin is suspended for two games. McElhenney and Reynolds get to address the crowd before the game against Torquay, but the game ends with a 1–1 draw. While the owners ultimately convey their joy of having visited Wrexham and their trust and belief in the club, the episode ends with a number of fans expressing their discontent about the season's results up to that point.
10	10	"Hooligans"	N/A	September 28, 2022	0.206
Police begin an investigation in Wrexham, after a Wrexham fan is assaulted by other Wrexham fans after the game against Torquay. The episode then explores the relationship between football and the so-called ultras and hooligans: A focus of the profile is Jonny Taylor, a Wrexham fan who is currently banned from the club's stadium after an incident in 2019, and his girlfriend Saskia Barkley, who previously applied to be fast-tracked into the Police as a Detective – Barkley disapproves of the way Taylor behaves, and their relationship is eventually cited as a reason why Barkley cannot become a Detective after she fails vetting.
11	11	"Sack the Gaffer"	Aldershot Town 0–5 Wrexham; King's Lynn Town 2–6 Wrexham; Wrexham 0–0 Wealdstone; FC Halifax Town 1–2 Wrexham; Wrexham 2–0 Bromley; Wrexham 0–2 Yeovil Town; Wrexham 1–0 Dover Athletic; Wrexham 1–0 Weymouth; Altrincham 0–2 Wrexham; Notts County 3–1 Wrexham; Yeovil Town 1–2 Wrexham	September 28, 2022	0.147
Twelve games into the season, Wrexham's results are not reassuring fans about the new direction of the club; as the club deals with numerous injuries and the January transfer window nearing, McElhenney and Reynolds are faced with having to defend their long-term hiring decisions – such as coach Phil Parkinson, who is seen by fans as not living up to his promise. The owners, among themselves, wrestle with the situation and the monetary implications of it, and decide on giving Parkinson the next 10 games as a chance to prove the team's worth. McElhenney also visits the Philadelphia Eagles and asks the advice of coach Nick Sirianni and owner Jeffrey Lurie: Lurie reassures McElhenney to think long-term, even if the short-term results are unsatisfactory. The team wins seven out of the designated ten games, with two losses and a 0–0 draw against Wealdstone – the latter being a point of humorous contention for McElhenney who invites all his friends to his bar to watch the game, only for it to turn out to be "so boring". The series of wins gets Wrexham up from 12th to third place, and against Yeovil Town the team turns a 0–1 game around to 2–1; this reassures the fans and owners alike for the owners to greenlight Parkinson's investment into a new forward: AFC Wimbledon's Ollie Palmer.
12	12	"Wins and Losses"	Wrexham 1–0 Grimsby Town; Chesterfield 0–2 Wrexham; Wrexham 4–1 Aldershot Town; Wrexham 2–0 King's Lynn Town; Wrexham 4–2 Boreham Wood	October 5, 2022	0.203
Palmer's signing at £300,000 sets a new signing fee record for the team, and he immediately begins to rack up goals after revealing a chemistry with Mullin. Wrexham local player Jordan Davies, however, is revealed to be struggling after he and his partner, Kelsey Edwards, receive news that there are serious problems with Edwards' pregnancy; their baby, Arthur, is eventually stillborn, which devastates them; they are, however, comforted by the outpouring of support from the club and fans alike, and they decide to fundraise for Sands, a charity dedicated to help parents who have suffered the same circumstances.
13	13	"Bad Breaks" / "Worst Team in the League"	Wrexham 0–0 Bromley; Wrexham 6–5 Dover Athletic	October 5, 2022	0.149
As Wrexham continue to march towards the top spot in the league, peripheral issues begin to arise: defender Cameron Green expresses dissatisfaction with the lack of playtime he's been getting, while goalkeeper Lainton suffers a dislocated wrist during the game against Bromley, which takes him out of the team for at least three months. This puts in Christian Dibble in goal for the remainder of the season; Dibble expresses his struggle with fans' criticism in reaction to mistakes he made in the past. At the game against last place team Dover Athletic, Wrexham's quick 2–0 lead is suddenly met with Dover scoring five goals in a row, including a hat-trick by Michael Gyasi, with one of them coming after Dibble accidentally punches defender Ben Tozer instead of the ball. Wrexham, comes back into the game and wins it 6–5 due to a Jordan Davies brace in injury time, but fans continue to blame Dibble for the team's struggle. Overall, however, the buzz around the team's potential promotion begins to grow in the city, with fans starting to experience hope again. Green and Parkinson mutually agree to release Green from his contract, and Green goes on to play for St Albans City.
14	14	"A Hollywood Distraction"	Wrexham 2–0 Stockport County (FA Trophy Semi-finals)	October 5, 2022	0.095
Reynolds arrives in Wrexham to film a commercial for 1Password with the team, to some minor chagrin of the staff, who feel it is an unnecessary distraction – McElhenney, similarly, provides running commentary throughout the whole episode complaining about Reynolds going to Wrexham without him. The team gears up to the FA Trophy semi-final against Stockport: Dibble's standout performance keeps Wrexham in the game, and after a strenuous 90 minutes, Mullin suddenly wins the game for the team after scoring two goals (one assisted by Dibble) in injury time, putting Wrexham into the FA Trophy final at Wembley Stadium. A visibly emotional Reynolds, having witnessed the game in person, admits that while he initially treated Wrexham as purely as a project of philanthropy, he now finally understands the emotion behind the game of football.
15	15	"Daggers"	Wrexham 3–0 Stockport County; Dagenham & Redbridge 3–0 Wrexham	October 5, 2022	0.101
The city and the team prepares to the last two league games of the season – the first against league leader Stockport, and the second against last year's spoilers Dag & Red. A win against Stockport at home will allow Wrexham to be in contention for the league champion title, which would result in automatic promotion into League Two – the team handily delivers the match 3–0 with Mullin scoring and a Palmer double. Leading up to the final match, fans and staff alike are aware that promotion depends on other results: If, in the game played simultaneously to Wrexham's, Stockport defeats Halifax, no matter how Wrexham's game finishes, they can only place second and will be forced to play in the playoffs for promotion. Fans watching both games soon become aware that Stockport takes an early lead in their game; while a deflated Wrexham finishes the Dag & Red game with a 0–3 loss, the supporters continue to give the team a standing ovation, now fully confident in their team for the remaining matches.
16	16	"Hello Wembley"	Bromley 1–0 Wrexham (FA Trophy Final)	October 12, 2022	0.282
Wrexham arrives at Wembley Stadium for the 2022 FA Trophy final against Bromley; the attendance also sees Will Ferrell, Kit Harington, David Beckham, Jason Sudeikis, as well as McElhenney's and Reynolds' wives Kaitlin Olson and Blake Lively; with the city of Wrexham fully and vehemently behind the team, both McElhenney and Reynolds admit they underestimated the weight of playing at Wembley. The match itself proves difficult, with both teams giving the best they have, with goalkeepers Christian Dibble and Ellery Balcombe instrumental in keeping the game goalless, until Bromley striker Michael Cheek scores in the 64th minute; McElhenney notes that he has not yet seen Wrexham win in person. Desperate to win, Parkinson substitutes in striker Jake Hyde, who in the last minute finds a stray ball and equalizes with a diving header – only to be disallowed due to offside. Bromley goes on to win minutes later. Beckham suggests to the owners to go down and talk to the deflated team, which they do; fans, while let down, continue to express their support and excitement for the final stretch of the season.
17	17	"Wromance"	N/A	October 12, 2022	0.245
After footage of McElhenney embracing Reynolds – instead of Olson, his wife – at the FA Trophy final goes viral, McElhenney and Reynolds dedicates the episode to explore platonic relationships between men, bringing in author Liz Plank to help explain the dynamics of their "bromance"; Plank contends that societal pressures keep men from being able to express affection towards each other, as it is not deemed "masculine" enough, and that sports allows a safe space to be able to do that. The episode also explores the paternal relationship lineage, and how sports is used as a conduit for men to spend time with their fathers and sons: Reynolds, McElhenney, Parkinson, Davies, Winter, Halton, Scoot and Wrexham fan and DVD-shop owner Rob Clarke all admit that their interest in sports was always driven by their respective fathers; in a vignette, Racecourse groundskeeper Paul "Chal" Chaloner is shown to act as a father figure to his apprentice Harry Jones.
18	18	"Do or Die"	Wrexham 4–5 (a.e.t.) Grimsby Town (National League Play-offs Semi-final)	October 12, 2022	0.197
With the season and the FA Trophy final behind them, Wrexham arrives at its biggest challenge yet under the new ownership: the playoff semi-finals against Grimsby Town – whoever wins gets to play in the playoff finals for promotion. Grimsby chair Jason Stockwood describes Grimsby as a town and club with a similar background to Wrexham, and muses about whether McElhenney and Reynolds will be there for the club when the wins do not come and fans turn against them. The owners and Harvey discuss the financial necessity to win the playoffs: The National League provides no membership residuals to clubs playing, but the EFL does, which means Wrexham loses about a million pounds each year they are not in the EFL. It becomes more apparent than ever: Wrexham must win. The match kicks off – interspersed with interviews with fans and players: Mullin takes the lead for Wrexham with an early penalty, but Grimsby striker John McAtee quickly equalizes, leading into an 1–1 half time. In the second half, former Wrexham defender Luke Waterfall puts Grimsby in the lead, but Tozer puts Wrexham back level again. Mullin puts Wrexham ahead with 3–2, but Grimsby equalizes after Ryan Taylor's header, and then Emmanuel Dieseruvwe takes the lead for Grismby, with Davies equalizing to a 4–4 full time. In extra time, both teams struggle to overcome the other, until Waterfall is left unmarked in the final minute and heads the ball into the goal for a 5–4 victory for Grimsby – Grimsby eventually goes on to win the playoffs and be promoted to League Two, while Wrexham stays in the National League. While the team is devastated, McElhenney tells them that what they achieved is more important: they gave the entire community of Wrexham hope for the future, and the city is now fully behind the football team – fans admit that despite the defeat, they have hope and optimism about going in to the next season.

== Season 2 (2023) ==
No. overall	No. in season	Title	Featured matches	Original release date
19	1	"Welcome Back to Wrexham"	Wrexham 2–1 Eastleigh; Chesterfield 2–0 Wrexham	September 12, 2023
Following the failure to get promoted out of non-league in the 2021–22 season, Wrexham A.F.C. doubles down on ensuring the best roster to achieve promotion: Mark Howard is brought in as a new goalkeeper to replace an injured Lainton and a departing Dibble, while midfielder Elliot Lee arrives to strengthen the offensive line – Lee immediately turns a match against Eastleigh around, but Howard struggles to get a good start for the season. Fans continue to remain hopeful, and embrace the club's sudden international exposure, which helps the town financially, but the board of directors is worried that the club becomes unsustainable if promotion is not achieved this year, based on the expenses to build a competitive squad and renovate the stadium. King Charles III arrives to honor Wrexham becoming a city, and visits the Racecourse Ground; Reynolds and McElhenney, after going through a crash course on royal etiquette, hope that the visit helps their bid to the Levelling Up Fund to renovate the Kop stand be viewed more favorably; while the full renovation would require £20 million, running out of time, they fund the initial demolition of the old Kop themselves. McElhenney continues to be frustrated by the British bureaucracy, and their bid is eventually rejected, leaving the Kop renovation in limbo.
20	2	"The Quiet Zone"	Wrexham 5–0 Solihull Moors	September 19, 2023
This episode profiles Millie Tipping who is a teenage Wrexham fan diagnosed with autism at an early age. She uses her Wrexham fandom as an outlet for her condition; her mother notes that after she was cut from the football team, something which gave her stability and socialization, she began to withdraw but being a fan allowed her to be more confident and outgoing. Similarly, Mullin shares his struggles about his young son, Albi, who was also diagnosed with nonverbal autism. When Mullin goes public with the diagnosis, and adorns his boots with his son's name, it encourages Tipping to approach Mullin and bond over their shared situation. She then gives him a goodie bag of things for Albi that help her cope with her condition and her prediction of a 5–0 victory comes true.
21	3	"Nott Yet"	Notts County 1–0 Wrexham	September 19, 2023
Eleven games into the season, Wrexham is top of the league with nearly no contest in sight; supporters of other clubs are ambivalent about the Hollywood injection: while some see it as pay-to-win and an additional motivation to beat Wrexham, others appreciate the positive effects on the communities and non-league football as a whole. Wrexham's perfect season, however, is spoiled by an unexpected rival: Notts County and their star striker Macaulay Langstaff, who have been on Wrexham's heels in the table. As their first head-to-head arrives at Meadow Lane, everyone is keenly aware that the two teams will likely decide the championship among themselves, and that their first clash is critical to the rest of the season. In the match, Langstaff takes the lead for Notts early, and Mullin's response in the second half is called offside, leaving the away game as a 1–0 loss. The episode also profiles Mark Griffiths, the long-time commentator of Wrexham's games; it also shows The Declan Swans record a new song "Mullin 10", which Mullin himself is shown approving of in the studio.
22	4	"Shaun's Vacation"	Boreham Wood 1–1 Wrexham; Wrexham 3–1 Halifax	September 26, 2023
After a year of work, Harvey finally gets to go on holiday to Tenerife with his wife, leaving Ker in charge. Immediately on the first day of Harvey's absence, McElhenney arrives to Wrexham to film a prank for Reynolds' birthday involving a blimp with Reynolds' face – in character as the scarred version of Deadpool – on it, violating Welsh aviation law. The next day, during an away match against Boreham Wood, unaware of the 3pm blackout law, McElhenney suggests putting the private live feed from the documentary cameras up on the televisions in The Turf. In both cases, Ker reluctantly contacts the vacationing Harvey to intervene. Two days later, Mullin posts an Instagram photo of his new boots emblazoned with the phrase "F*** THE TORIES", causing controversy, worsened by the photo being taken at the Racecourse and Reynolds putting a like on it, both of which imply a club endorsement. In the resulting public relations situation, Harvey threatens to cut his vacation short and travel back to Wrexham, but Ker successfully implores Reynolds to get McElhenney to talk Harvey out of it and let the club do damage control. Ultimately, McElhenney witnesses a 3–1 win against Halifax.
23	5	"First Losers"	Dorking Wanderers 3–1 Notts County; Wrexham 0–0 Wealdstone	September 26, 2023
As Wrexham trails Notts County on the league table, fans worry that the team will once again "do a Wrexham" and let victory slip in the last minute, as it has happened many times during the club's history. McElhenney similarly muses on his past year where he has watched Wrexham place second both in the National League and the FA Trophy, Wrexham A.F.C. Women place second in the Adran North, Philadelphia Union place second in both the MLS league and the MLS Cup, the Philadelphia Phillies lose in the World Series, and the Philadelphia Eagles lose Super Bowl LVII – most of which he witnessed in person. The episode interviews people who demonstrated a desire to win despite setbacks: Actress Susan Lucci – known for having 19 Emmy nominations for Lead Actress before winning one – describes using her losses as a motivation to work harder; newcomer Wrexham defender Jacob Mendy talks about being a Gambian immigrant to Spain and the United Kingdom, and working as a cleaner and construction worker while pursuing a football career; and Dorking Wanderers owner/manager Marc White tells the story of creating his club from scratch and going from the Crawley and District Football League (then the 17th tier of English football) to the National League, gaining a record setting 12 promotions in 23 years in the process.
24	6	"Ballers"	Wrexham A.F.C. Women 5–2 Llandudno F.C. Women; Connah's Quay Nomads F.C. Women 1–3 Wrexham A.F.C. Women; Rhyl F.C. Women 1–11 Wrexham A.F.C. Women	October 3, 2023
While the Wrexham men's team is chasing promotion, the women's team is aiming to do the same, trying to qualify to the Adran Premier, which would allow the team to go semi-professional, as opposed to their current amateur status: lead goalscorer Rosie Hughes works in HM Prison Berwyn as a guard, while child prodigy midfielder Lili Jones works as a kitchen porter. The players also have deep Wrexham connections: Jones' father, Gareth "Powsy" Jones, was a dedicated Wrexham fan before his suicide in early 2021, while defender (Note: Erroneously referred in the episode as a midfielder.) Mia Roberts is the daughter of Wrexham legend Neil Roberts, captain of the ill-fated team who were relegated to the National League in 2008. Under the management of Gemma and Gareth Owen, the team is looking to have a perfect season, despite the substantially smaller crowds and destitute conditions they play in; after defeating season rival Connah's Quay, the team clinches the top spot of Adran North in a 1–11 win against Rhyl, and earns the chance to compete in the promotion playoffs against Briton Ferry Llansawel A.F.C..
25	7	"Giant Killers"	Wrexham 2–1 Arsenal (1991–92 FA Cup Third Round); Wrexham 2–1 Middlesbrough (1999 FA Cup Third Round); Coventry City 3–4 Wrexham (FA Cup Third Round); Wrexham 3–3 Sheffield United (FA Cup Fourth Round); Sheffield United 3–1 Wrexham (FA Cup Fourth Round (Replay))	October 10, 2023
Concurrent to the National League, Wrexham competes in the FA Cup, a single-elimination tournament with every English football club from all tiers participating; over the decades, Wrexham has become known for its "giant killings", unexpectedly eliminating much higher tier teams, such as the surprise 1991 victory against Arsenal. The team is drawn together in the third round with Coventry City, an EFL Championship team three tiers above Wrexham, with Coventry playing home. During the match, Sam Dalby and Elliot Lee give Wrexham an early lead, and Tom O'Connor and Mullin make it 4–1 by the 60th minute; Coventry close it up to 4–3, and it takes Howard's last=moment saves to keep the score as a victory – as both McElhenney and Reynolds are watching from the United States, an unexpected ESPN broadcast disruption adds to their anxiety, but the team eventually prevails. The town is ecstatic about the results, and everyone looks forward to the next opponent in the fourth round: Sheffield United, a team who also plays in the EFL Championship, but is expected to be promoted to the Premier League. Oli McBurnie takes the lead for Sheffield United in the second minute, and both centre-backs Hayden and Jordan Tunnicliffe have to come off with an injury. With a 0–1 half time, the team comes out aggressively to the second half, and James Jones eventually equalizes. O'Connor takes the lead for Wrexham, but Oliver Norwood brings Sheffield United up level; Sheffield United's Daniel Jebbison is sent off for kicking Tozer when off the ball. Mullin puts victory and another giant killing in reach with a 86th-minute goal, but John Egan equalizes for Sheffield United in injury time, sending the two teams to a replay at Bramall Lane; despite the disappointment, a visibly shaken Reynolds, who witnessed the game in person, on the verge of tears tells the players in the locker room that what they have achieved that day is extraordinary. In the replay, Wrexham holds up for most of the game, but loses 3–1 in injury time; both fans and the team agree that they have more than measured up to their opponent, pointing to Sheffield United captain Billy Sharp who taunts Wrexham supporters after the final whistle, and gives some incensed remarks to the press, which he is eventually fined for by The FA. Now eliminated from the Cup, the team turns its focus back on getting promoted out of the National League.
26	8	"The Grind"	Wrexham 3–1 Wealdstone; Wrexham 2–2 Woking; Aldershot Town 3–4 Wrexham; Wrexham 2–0 Scunthorpe United; Wrexham 3–1 Dorking Wanderers; Wrexham 2–1 Chesterfield; Maidenhead 2–2 Wrexham; Dag & Red 0–4 Wrexham; Wrexham 1–0 Southend United	October 17, 2023
In the promotion race against Notts County, as a result of a number of match postponements due to the FA Cup run, pitch conditions, and the death of Queen Elizabeth, Wrexham has to face nine matches in the period of a month, with two matches per week; the physical demand gradually increases the number of injuries on the team. Midfielder Anthony Forde eventually goes on hiatus when his brother is diagnosed with leukemia, and his wife is diagnosed with a brain tumor and loses some motor function on her left side of the body. Before the match against Southend, temperature drops to −24 °C (−11 °F) and the entire Racecourse pitch freezes with a thick layer of snow; as the match cannot be postponed, the club calls on everyone on club management, staff and fans to help with the chore of shoveling the snow; around fifty people, including Harvey, Parkinson, Gemma Owen, and women's captain Kim Dutton, take part in the operation and clean the snow off the pitch by noon; the team wins later that day, collecting 23 points from the possible 27 in the nine games, finally taking over Notts County at the top of the table by four points with ten games to go. The episode profiles team captain Luke Young, detailing his "workhorse" mentality and physical work statistics per game, and returns to profile fan Shaun Winter, who reflects on his appearances in the previous season of the show, how they helped him face his alcoholism, and his current efforts as a coach for his son's football team.
27	9	"Glove Triangle"	Bromley 1–2 Wrexham; Wrexham 3–0 York City	October 17, 2023
After a year-long injury, Lainton returns to take back the number one goalkeeper spot from Howard; while Howard has been having an outstanding season, he's supportive of Lainton. At a match against Bromley at Hayes Lane – the same place where Lainton was injured with a concussion in 2020 and a fractured wrist in 2022 – during a seemingly routine kick nearing half time, Lainton feels a pain in his knee: during half time, physio Mulholland immediately diagnoses a torn MCL. Lainton is subbed off for Howard, and is forced to miss the rest of the season. Both fans and staff continue to trust Howard, but the club wants to ensure squad depth in the position, and takes an opportunity to sign retired former England international Ben Foster; Foster credits Wrexham for kickstarting his legendary professional career, having played for the club in 2005, but has been retired for nine months at the age of 40, and has been spending his time running a successful YouTube channel and – like Howard – a podcast. Media and football fans are skeptical of the move, labeling it a "money grab", but Foster makes it clear on his podcast that his financial terms on the contract are modest, and that his main motivation is to get the club promoted. Howard openly supports Foster becoming the number one, also arguing that promotion is the main goal, and the two discuss the situation on Howard's podcast. In Foster's first match against York City, he keeps a clean sheet contributing to a 3–0 win; both him and fans speculate that the team may be good enough not just for League Two but League One. For that to happen though, the team first has to win the next two games against Halifax, and, more critically, against their season nemesis: Notts County.
28	10	"Gresford"	Wrexham 6–0 Torquay	October 24, 2023
The episode explores the relationship of the football club and the memory of the tragedy of the Gresford Colliery: on 22 September 1934, a gas explosion in the Gresford coal mine causes the mine to cave in, trapping and killing 266 men – men who traded their shifts to be able to witness a Wrexham football match the next day. McElhenney and his father visits the memorial and learns about the event; McElhenney's father explains that his great-grandfather was also a miner in Donegal, but also draws a parallel with the working class lives that have been lost in the Vietnam War. They learn that while one of the colliery wheels from the mine have been restored as a memorial, the other is currently abandoned; McElhenney explains his plans to restore the wheel and place it behind the renovated Kop, to connect the memory of the tragedy closer to the club. On the match played on the anniversary of the disaster, Wrexham beats Torquay 6–0, as the crowd sings along to "Yma o Hyd".
29	11	"Yn Codi" (Note: Welsh for "Rise")	Wrexham A.F.C. Women 2–1 Connah's Quay; Wrexham A.F.C. Women 1–0 Briton Ferry	October 24, 2023
As the women's team prepares for their final league game to set a historic 100% win record, another record is in sight: The club arranges for the game to be played at the Racecourse, allowing the team to set an attendance record for a women's football game in Wales. The players all express anxiety about the chance to play in front of such a large home crowd, and the stadium eventually is filled with 9,511 ticket holders – near double the previous record. At the game, T.J. Dickens chips Connah's Quay keeper Grace Murphy in the fifth minute to get Wrexham the lead, but Ella Harvey equalizes soon after; Wrexham eventually wins the game by a half-pitch solo run by Hughes, setting the win record, and preparing the team for the eventual Adran playoff final against Briton Ferry Llansawel. The playoff game, taking place at Latham Park, proves to be the toughest challenge the team faced, and Wrexham – for the first time in the season – is forced to defend, with some goalkeeping heroics by Delyth Morgan. In the second half, Hughes locks on a stray ball and her cross is deflected into the goal by Rebecca Pritchard; Briton Ferry applies pressure in the remainder of the game, but Morgan keeps a clean sheet, and the team finishes with a 1–0 win, earning promotion to the top Welsh women's football league, the Adran Premier.
30	12	"Hand of Foz"	Notts County 1–0 Wrexham; Halifax 3–1 Wrexham; Wrexham 3–2 Notts County	October 31, 2023
With five rounds remaining in the season, both Wrexham and Notts County are both on track to break the 103-point record set by Fleetwood in 2012, but everyone is aware that whoever wins the head-to-head encounter is likely to earn automatic promotion; Wrexham's confidence is shaken when three days before the Notts game, the seemingly routine away match against Halifax turns out to be a shocking 1–3 loss. McElhenney and Reynolds arrive in Wales for the match, and are awarded Freedom of the Borough for Wrexham, but both them, the players, and the fans admit they can only ever focus on the upcoming title race; management reiterates that promotion at this point is necessary to keep the club financially sustainable. In the match on Easter Monday, the first half brings a tense battle, with Wrexham disputing many of referee Scott Tallis' calls; just as the half is about to end, John Bostock scores for Notts from a free kick. Wrexham comes out full swing in the second half, with Mullin equalizing and Mendy taking the lead, but Kyle Cameron brings County level. Lee takes the lead for Wrexham again, but six minutes into added time, the referee awards Notts County a penalty after Eoghan O'Connell's handball. Fans and staff watch as Cedwyn Scott steps up to take the penalty, but Foster dives the right way and saves the shot, winning the game for Wrexham, and putting promotion now in direct reach.
31	13	"Family Business"	N/A	November 7, 2023
The episode focuses on some of the family relationships of the people around the club: Reynolds's mother Tamara admits being the emotional support for her children, acknowledging that their father Jim had difficulties being emotionally connected; CEO Robinson talks about her heritage at Burton Albion where her father Ben is chairman; Lee talks about his father 21-time English international Rob Lee. Ollie Palmer admits to similarities in the difficulties of his current life – commuting between London and Wrexham, and having less time with his family as a result – to his growing up where his father Andy Palmer, a Protection Officer to the British royal family, had often had to sacrifice his family time to his job. Andy eventually divorced Ollie's mum Sue, after admitting to himself that he was a closeted homosexual; after the initial shock, all three maintain a good relationship today, and Ollie talks about feeling a kinship to McElhenney, whose mother also came out of the closet.
32	14	"Worst Case Scenario"	Barnet 0–0 Wrexham; Wrexham 3–0 Yeovil	November 7, 2023
After a scoreless draw against Barnet, Wrexham must win at least two games of the upcoming three for promotion; management reiterates that they effectively gambled their financial plan on getting promoted, and bring in sponsors to offset the cost. McElhenney develops a stye under his eye from the stress. Forde returns to the team after his six-week sabbatical; he highlights that Reynolds helped him and his partner get a second opinion on her tumor, and that the results were reassuring. The team prepares for the game against 22nd place Yeovil, an easy win in theory, with It's Always Sunny in Philadelphia cast members Olson, Glenn Howerton and Charlie Day in attendance for the match. The team keeps the pressure up in the match, but half-time still ends scoreless after many missed chances. Forde finally breaks the deadlock in the 60th minute, with Jones and Mullin rounding up the score to a 3–0 home win, putting Wrexham just one win away from the coveted promotion.
33	15	"Up the Town?"	Wrexham 3–1 Boreham Wood	November 14, 2023
With only three points remaining to promotion, Wrexham faces Boreham Wood at the Racecourse – Boreham Wood is widely believed to have the league's best defense and best goalkeeper, Nathan Ashmore. Notts County players Langstaff, Bostock, Scott and head coach Luke Williams talk about the risk of the playoffs; Williams also talks about consoling Scott about his missed penalty against Wrexham. The decisive match against Boreham Wood begins with an immediate shock as Lee Ndlovu lobs Foster and takes the lead for the visitors with less than a minute played. Wrexham begins to apply pressure against a tenacious Boreham Wood defense, and Lee equalizes in the 15th minute, leading to an 1–1 half-time. In the second half, the pressure eventually breaks through as Mullin scores twice, putting Wrexham minutes away from the coveted promotion. When referee Scott Jackson blows the final whistle at 3–1, emotions run high as the supporters invade the pitch, carrying the players on their shoulders, with the 15-year curse ending with Wrexham's promotion back to the football league. In the epilogue, 40,000 people show up for the celebratory open top bus parade for both the men's and women's teams' promotions – in attendance is Davies, with his newborn daughter, who was born on the morning of the parade – and Notts also achieves promotion in Wembley against Chesterfield after Scott scores the winning penalty in the shootout.

== Season 3 (2024) ==
No. overall	No. in season	Title	Featured matches	Original release date
34	1	"Welcome to the EFL"	Chelsea 5–0 Wrexham; L.A. Galaxy II 0–4 Wrexham; Manchester United 1–3 Wrexham; Wrexham 3–5 MK Dons	May 2, 2024
After winning the 2022–23 National League season and finally getting promoted to EFL League Two, the players are afforded a celebratory vacation to Las Vegas; McElhenney and Reynolds convince Foster to play for the club for another year. The team then embarks on a preseason tour around the United States, playing to sold out crowds against Premier League clubs Chelsea and Manchester United. Against Manchester United at Snapdragon Stadium, Mullin suffers a collision against goalkeeper Nathan Bishop, suffering four rib fractures and a punctured lung as a result. While his condition is eventually stabilized in the hospital, he is prohibited from immediately flying back to the UK, and is forced to stay in California for two weeks, missing the start of the season. Despite the setback, the team and town are eager to head into the team's first EFL game in fifteen years against Milton Keynes Dons, a team that just got relegated to League Two from EFL League One. The enthusiasm is quickly quelled, however, when an own goal from O'Connell opens the scoring line, with Mohamed Eisa doubling the Dons' lead in just ten minutes into the game; Mendy brings Wrexham one back just before half-time, but the second half escalates even further with Jonathan Leko scoring twice for the Dons; goals from Davies, Daniel Harvie and Forde bring the game to a final loss of 3–5.
35	2	"Goals"	Wrexham 5–5 Swindon; Wrexham 3–0 Grimsby Town	May 2, 2024
Reeling from the opening defeat, the club finishes the transfer window bringing in a handful of new players, among them tenured veterans Ireland international James McClean and Scottish international Steven Fletcher. A match against Swindon at the Racecourse begins with the team down 1–4 at half-time; both Lee and Parkinson are incensed at the team's lackluster performance. Coming out to the second half, the team manages to salvage the game in injury time to a 5–5 draw; fans applaud the fighting spirit the team displays, but major concerns are raised about the team's defense, and Foster announces his re-retirement after conceding 14 goals in just four games, which comes as a shock to the team and fans alike, leaving Howard in goal. Mullin returns to Wrexham and continues slow rehabilitation for his injury, and finally returns to the starting eleven for the grudge match against Grimsby, the team that knocked out Wrexham from the National League playoffs two seasons ago: While Mullin is unable to score, the team handily wins the match 3–0 with goals from Palmer, Will Boyle and Lee. The episode also profiles photographer Oliver Stephen: a quiet, reclusive presence, Stephen details his mental health struggles, and how the football club has given him an outlet for his artistic side – even though he's never been to an actual match due to his anxiety.
36	3	"Notts Again"	Wrexham Women 3–3 Swansea City Ladies F.C.; Stockport 5–0 Wrexham; Wrexham Women 0–3 Cardiff City F.C.; Wrexham 3–3 Crewe Alexandra F.C.; Notts County 0–2 Wrexham	May 9, 2024
Continuing in the EFL, Wrexham visits former National League rivals Stockport – after the last two games two seasons ago ending in a resounding victory, Wrexham is debilitated by a 0–5 defeat; looking to replace the departed Foster, the team brings in Arsenal goalkeeper Arthur Okonkwo on a loan; Howard, once again, shows understanding. The team steadily improves with Okonkwo in goal, and the visit to last year's rival Notts County results in a 0–2 victory, cementing the team's place in the top 3 of League Two. Meanwhile, the women's team begins the 2023–24 Adran Premier season, with major changes: the team moves stadiums to The Rock, Rhosymedre, players are given a semi-professional status, and new staff is brought in to help with the team's physical conditioning. Five players, however, are released at the start of the season, including Mia Roberts; Roberts admits disappointment, but is hopeful about her eventual return. The team kicks off the season with a tight 3–3 draw against Swansea and a 3–0 loss against Cardiff, but a string of wins stabilizes them also in the top 3 of their league. The episode also puts an overarching emphasis on mental health: it profiles Dan Rowe, a consultant for the Wrexham branch of Andy's Man Club, a support group for men, and the men's team's sports psychologist Sam Kotadia.
37	4	"Risky Business"	Wrexham 6–0 Morecambe; Harrogate 2–2 Wrexham	May 16, 2024
As the club continues to claw its way towards the top of League Two, the town begins to feel the effects as the new found focus on the town allows residents to open businesses: McElhenney, as part of his "birthday war" with Reynolds, announces to renovate an iconic part of the town as a park, Zimbabwean immigrant Valerie Creusailor talks about her local condiment business, Neil Roberts explains his upcoming phase in life after football as a bar owner, and Ollie Palmer talks about his new clothing line; both Roberts and Palmer emphasize that football players have a relatively short career, and that entrepreneurship has become a necessity in the modern footballing world to allow for a living post-retirement. On the pitch, Wrexham wins a match against Morecambe, but against Harrogate Town, at a 2–0 Wrexham lead, Okonkwo has a knock to the head: he insists to continue playing, but appears distant and continues to spit blood, and is subbed off for Howard at half-time; the match ends with a 2–2 draw, and Okonkwo is diagnosed with a fractured jaw.
38	5	"Temporary"	Wrexham 2–1 Colchester; Wrexham 2–0 Newport	May 23, 2024
The management of the team continues to struggle with the lack of The Kop stand, which cannot be built for various bureaucratic reasons; McElhenney proposes a temporary stand, which both Harvey and Ker protest against, as it would be a heavy financial loss, and potentially a safety hazard – the temporary stand eventually is raised, increasing the stadium capacity to above 10,000 seats for the first time since 2007. Howard keeps the team winning, and Okonkwo eventually returns wearing a protective face mask. Midfielder James Jones recollects a period last season during which his wife pregnant with their child has to go through a Caesarean section to give birth, and both of the child's and her lives remained in danger for months; Jones eventually becomes the first person to score in front of the "new" Kop against Newport. The win keeps Wrexham in the Top 3 for automatic promotion; previous season's rival Notts County, however, loses momentum and languishes lower-mid-table after a series of injuries, and the departure of head coach Luke Williams – it becomes apparent that the biggest opponent Wrexham faces this season will be Stockport. Elderly fan Arthur Massey becomes a centenarian, and the club honours him with a hundred seconds of applause, as he reflects on his time having seen the club change; the final shot of the episode is him sitting in the new, temporary stand.
39	6	"Far Away, So Close"	Guinea 1–0 Gambia; Newport 1–0 Wrexham; Salford 3–1 Wrexham; Wrexham 0–1 Bradford; MK Dons 1–1 Wrexham; Gillingham 1–0 Wrexham; Forest Green 1–1 Wrexham; Wrexham 4–0 Accrington	May 30, 2024
Despite having one of the best home record in the league, at the turn of the season, Wrexham continues to struggle with its away performances, slowly sliding out of the Top 3 to the playoff places; fans begin to feel uneasy and question Parkinson's match decisions and Mullin's fitness; while Arsenal decides not to recall Okonkwo who can then fill out the rest of the season at Wrexham, Mendy is called up to the Gambia national football team to represent his home country at the 2023 Africa Cup of Nations. After a disastrous eight-game stretch of only two wins and four losses, McElhenney returns to Wales to support the team and to meet with Prince William visiting Wrexham for Saint David's Day; the team eventually turns their luck around with a resounding 4–0 victory against Accrington Stanley, with Mullin scoring his second hat-trick of the season. The episode also chronicles the team's popularity in Welsh Patagonia; a community established by Welsh settlers in Patagonia, Argentina in the 1800s – members of the community, while born in Argentina, speak Welsh, identify as Welsh, and keep long distance friendships with the people of Wrexham. McElhenney and Reynolds offer to travel a number of Patagonian fans to the game, where they take part in the Saint David's Day parade and witness the victorious match.
40	7	"Proper Trouble"	Wrexham 0–1 Tranmere; Wrexham Women 1–0 Aberystwyth Ladies; Wrexham 2–0 Mansfield; Doncaster 1–0 Wrexham	June 6, 2024
As the season approaches its ending, Wrexham is trying to keep its precarious position in the automatic promotion spots; McClean is suspended for the derby against Tranmere after collecting too many yellow cards; the match, with heightened police presence, ends with a 0–1 loss, and concludes with a minor brawl on pitch. The team turns their form around with a 2–0 home win against promotion contender Mansfield, but the away form curse returns with a 1–0 defeat against Doncaster, a team fighting relegation. Simultaneously, the women's team continues to establish their place in the Adran Premier, and secures a place in the top half of the league before it splits, (Note: In the Adran Premier, after all eight teams have played each other twice, the league splits into the top and bottom halves, with the top four teams playing each other twice for the championship, and the bottom four teams playing each other to avoid relegation.) after newcomer Carra Jones wins the game for the team against Aberystwyth. Behind the scenes, management brings aboard Ally Financial to sponsor the women's team a pre-season tour in the United States as well. McClean also talks about his illustrious career marred by controversy: as an Irishman from Derry – the scene of the "Bloody Sunday" massacre in 1972 – he holds historic animus against the English, and his defiance of tradition has made him a target of criticism and abuse.
41	8	"Down to the Wire"	Colchester 1–2 Wrexham; Cardiff 2–0 Wrexham Women (2023–24 FAW Women's Cup Final); Wrexham 6–0 Forest Green; Wrexham 2–1 Stockport	June 13, 2024
As the season closes, the women's team finishes third in the Adran Premier – a much better final placement than expected – but as a final challenge, they take on Cardiff in the FAW Women's Cup Final: Despite a close game, Cardiff eventually prevails 2–0; team and management alike vow to take the title from them next season. The men's team – aware that they have no room to drop points anymore to secure automatic promotion – win their final away game against Colchester, and for the next match at the Racecourse against Forest Green, Wrexham has the opportunity to secure automatic promotion provided they win, while in two matches played simultaneously, Mansfield wins against MK Dons, and Gillingham wins against Barrow; chances seem slim, so both McElhenney and Reynolds decide to skip the match and stay in North America. While Wrexham confidently begins to rack up goals against FGR, the other two matches initially do not go their way, but as the crowd begins to receive news that both Gillingham and Mansfield are winning, the enthusiasm begin to alert players, who are otherwise unaware of the results. Eventually all three matches end in Wrexham's favor, and the team secures back-to-back promotions to EFL League One, as supporters once again invade the pitch in celebration. The final game of the season against league winners Stockport is both jubilant and bittersweet, as the club is aware that many of the players will have to be released from the club, among them captains Young and Tozer, and as such they might be playing their last games that day. Wrexham wins the game 2–1, and photographer Stephen marks a personal victory by overcoming his anxiety and attending his first ever Wrexham game.

== Season 4 (2025) ==
No. overall	No. in season	Title	Featured matches	Original release date
42	1	"All In?"	N/A	May 15, 2025
The team's promotion to League One fills the town with excitement, the prospect of achieving promotion three years in a row - a feat no team in EFL history has achieved before - is matched with concern of the increased difficulty in opponents; CEO Robinson departs to Burton and is replaced by former Inter Milan CFO Michael Williamson. Former loanee Okonkwo signs permanently to the club, but Mullin is sidelined from pre-season when he needs to undergo surgery for a herniated disc. Both the men's and women's teams go on a pre-season tour to the West Coast of the United States but while the men's team holds their own against Premier League clubs Bournemouth and Chelsea, the women's team loses all three of their games with a 22–1 aggregate, and Hughes draws controversy after a gaffe during a red carpet interview. Ker, meanwhile, in order to raise £250,000 for the Wrexham Miners Project charity, begins training for the Manchester Marathon, despite having no long-distance running experience. As the season opener nears, the directors are faced with having to make a decision: The team can play it safe, avoid relegation in League One, and control expenses to break even, but delay promotion to the EFL Championship with about five years; or it can aim for promotion, amass significantly larger expenses – rebuilding the Kop, a training ground, an academy, a new pitch – and risk failing to recoup about 50 million pounds if the team does not reach promotion. Reynolds and McElhenney eventually decide to take the gamble and go for promotion. The episode also profiles Rebecca McHugh, a mobile café owner.
43	2	"High Hopes"	Wrexham 3–2 Wycombe; Birmingham 3–1 Wrexham	May 15, 2025
Wrexham begins its season against promotion contender Wycombe Wanderers; goals by Max Cleworth, Jack Marriott and Fletcher help the team to a 3–2 victory, and after the first 5 matches, Wrexham takes first place in the league table. The women's team, however, continues to struggle, losing their first three games against Cardiff, Briton Ferry and Swansea. As the club prepares to upgrade their infrastructure - partly in anticipation for hosting the U19 Euros in 2026 - they face a notable adversary in former Premier League team Birmingham City, who have recently just been relegated from the Championship, and have new ownership, including former NFL player Tom Brady, who are outspending Wrexham by an order of magnitude. In the game at St Andrew's, Marriott takes the lead early for Wrexham, but eventually the difference between the two clubs begins to show, and Birmingham wins 3–1 with a Jay Stansfield brace. The episode also profiles Yaroslav and Oksana Izveikov, a couple who fled to Wales from Chortkiv, Ukraine after the Russian invasion of Ukraine; forced to restart their lives with their two children from scratch, the couple now runs a café in Wrexham.
44	3	"Disney FC"	Wrexham 1–0 Mansfield; Stockport 1–0 Wrexham; Wrexham 1–0 Barnsley	May 22, 2025
Wrexham faces their first difficulties of the season when top goalscorer Marriott breaks his fibula during training, followed by Okonkwo injuring his wrist during a game against Mansfield; backup goalkeeper Callum Burton comes in, but is unable to keep the team from losing against long-time rivals Stockport. Burton leads the team into two clean sheet wins, but tears his quadriceps during the game against Barnsley, forcing Howard to come in. The game, which is being streamed at the Los Angeles Cosm, concludes with a last-minute win with a goal by Oliver Rathbone. The club also announces that Eric and Kaleen Allyn, former owners of Welch Allyn, have purchased a minority stake in the club, while Ker continues to train for the marathon at the Manchester Institute of Health & Performance.
45	4	"Built to Last"	Wrexham 2–2 Cambridge; Wrexham Academy 1–0 Morecambe Academy; Wrexham 2–1 Wigan; Wrexham 1–0 Peterborough	May 29, 2025
The episode builds a contrast between the older and more experienced, and the younger and up-and-coming: Veterans Fletcher and Howard continue to serve the club, including Fletcher scoring three late-game winning goals in three matches, while the academy team wins 1-0 against Morecambe, as management prepares to expand on academy facilities. The women's team, meanwhile, begins to turn their season around with a string of cup wins, before U19 manager Gareth Owen's ischemic stroke.
46	5	"Anything's Possible"	Shrewsbury 2–1 Wrexham; Wrexham 1–1 Birmingham; Wrexham 2–3 Stevenage; Crawley 1–2 Wrexham; Northampton 0–2 Wrexham	June 5, 2025
As the transfer window nears, while Rathbone continues to impress, fans and club begin to worry about the team's offensive capabilities, especially after a loss against long-time rivals Shrewsbury and a surprise loss against Stevenage; during the window, the team signs Sam Smith, Ryan Longman and Jay Rodriguez, but James Jones and Anthony Forde are released, and the future of Mullin and Palmer - once the leading players of the club, by now the third choice - begin being called into question. The transitive nature of football is analogized with the lives of the town: Commentator Griffiths muses about retiring his teaching job, and the town mourns centenarian fan Arthur Massey, who passed away before the season opener game.
47	6	"Red Dragons"	Wrexham 1–2 Leyton Orient; Mansfield Town 1–2 Wrexham; Reading 2–0 Wrexham	June 12, 2025
With the season entering its final quarter, Mullin and Palmer continue to struggle with the mental load of being left out of the squad; Mullin finds solace in helping Archie White, a young fan suffering from myeloid sarcoma. Ker, as practice for the marathon, completes the New York City Half Marathon with Foster and Williamson; Harvey talks about his controversial past as the CEO of the EFL. A small delegation from the club visits Kick 4 Life F.C., a Lesotho-based football club dedicated to social change.
48	7	"Life or Death"	Wycombe 0–1 Wrexham; Swansea Women 2–3 Wrexham Women; Stockport 0–1 Wrexham; Exeter 0–2 Wrexham; Cambridge 2–2 Wrexham; Wrexham 3–0 Burton	June 19, 2025
Leading up to a six-point game against Wycombe, McClean suffers a car accident, from which he suffers no injury. The Wycombe game proves to be a tense 0–0 draw until the 75th minute, when the game is interrupted when a Wrexham fan goes into cardiac arrest in the away end; the fan, 71-year-old Maurice Jones, is defibrillated and placed into induced coma, but survives without any permanent brain damage—which the club credits to the rapid response of the Wycombe staff—and the team wins the game 0–1. Premier League veteran and new signing Rodriguez is brought under criticism for missing too many scoring chances; he misses a penalty against Stockport but scores on the rebound and scores against Exeter, but the team is unable to shake off Wycombe for the second place. In a crucial game against Burton—with Reynolds present, Palmer watching from home, and former player Forde playing for Burton—the team wins 3–0 while Wycombe loses to Reading, establishing a six-point lead in second place with five games to go. In the last round of the Adran Premier before the league splits, the women's team faces Swansea for a decisive game about who gets to be in the championship four; despite never having won against Swansea, the team wins 3–2 with newcomer goalkeeper Liz Craven's saves and a last-minute Keren Allen goal.
49	8	"Do a Wrexham"	Wigan 0–0 Wrexham; Wrexham 1–1 Bristol Rovers; Blackpool 1–2 Wrexham; Wrexham 3–0 Charlton	June 26, 2025
Neck-and-neck with Wycombe, Wrexham goes into the final five games of the season, but fails to capitalize with a draw against Wigan and another draw at home against relegation contenders Bristol Rovers; with Wycombe winning against Stevenage and Bolton, they take the second automatic promotion spot. The Wrexham academy conducts its end of the year review; striker Tom Kelly is offered a first team contract, but goalkeeper Bryn Owen is not. Ker successfully completes the Manchester Marathon, concluding that he hated every second of the process. McElhenney joins the supporters in the away end for the game against Blackpool; goals from McClean and Rathbone secure a 1–2 away victory. With Wycombe losing 0–4 to Charlton, Wrexham takes back the promotion spot with two games to go. In the next round, the entire town watches Wycombe lose an early game 1–0 against Leyton Orient, putting Wrexham a win away from the historic promotion. To relieve the pressure, Parkinson asks McElhenney for a pep talk, who asks the players and staff to visualize the joy they had playing football in their childhood. The match against Charlton—interspersed with archival childhood footage of the players—goes Wrexham's way as they take promotion with a 3–0 win with goals by Rathbone and Smith. As news spreads and commentators question whether the club can go for a fourth successive promotion to the Premier League, McElhenney calls instead for enjoying the moment.

== Season 5 (2026) ==
No. overall	No. in season	Title	Featured matches	Original release date
50	1	"The Heart of Wrexham"	Melbourne Victory 3–0 Wrexham; Southampton 2–1 Wrexham; Wrexham 2–3 West Bromwich Albion; Wrexham 1–1 Derby County	May 14, 2026
51	2	"Joey Jones"	Wrexham 3–3 (5–3 p) Hull City (EFL Cup); Wrexham 2–2 Sheffield Wednesday; Millwall 0–2 Wrexham; Wrexham 1–3 Queens Park Rangers	May 14, 2026
52	3	"Coming Together"	Leicester City 1–1 Wrexham; Wrexham 1–1 Birmingham City; Stoke City 1–0 Wrexham; Wrexham 1–0 Oxford United; Briton Ferry Llansawel A.F.C. Ladies 2–5 Wrexham A.F.C. Women; Middlesbrough 1–1 Wrexham; Wrexham 3–2 Coventry City	May 21, 2026
53	4	"Wales Forever"	Wrexham 2–0 Charlton Athletic; Wrexham 2–0 Bristol City; Manchester City P.F.C. 0–6 Wrexham A.F.C. Powerchair; Wrexham 1–1 Blackburn Rovers; Preston North End 1–1 Wrexham; Hull City 2–0 Wrexham; Wrexham 2–2 Watford; Wrexham 4–0 Swansea City (September 14, 2002); Swansea City 2–1 Wrexham (December 19, 2025)	May 28, 2026
54	5	"Holiday Spirit"	Wrexham 2–2 Watford; Wrexham 2–1 Preston North End; Blackburn Rovers 0–2 Wrexham; Wrexham 5–3 Sheffield United; Derby County 1–2 Wrexham; Wrexham 3–3 (4–3 p) Nottingham Forest; Queens Park Rangers 2–3 Wrexham	June 4, 2026
55	6	"Hell Week"	Sheffield Wednesday 0–1 Wrexham; Wrexham 1–0 Ipswich Town (FA Cup); Wrexham 5–3 Ipswich Town; Wrexham 2–4 (a.e.t.) Chelsea (FA Cup); Wrexham 1–2 Hull City; Wrexham 2–0 Swansea City	June 11, 2026
56	7	"Touching Grass"	Wrexham 2–0 Swansea City; Watford 3–1 Wrexham; Sheffield United 1–2 Wrexham; Wrexham 1–5 Southampton; Birmingham City 2–0 Wrexham	June 18, 2026
57	8	"We Go Again"	Wrexham 2–0 Stoke City; Oxford City 0–1 Wrexham; Wrexham A.F.C. Women 2–2 (4–2 p) Cardiff City F.C. (women) (Adran Trophy); Wrexham A.F.C. Women 4–1 Cardiff City F.C. (women); Coventry City 3–1 Wrexham; Wrexham 2–2 Middlesbrough; Hull City 1–0 Middlesbrough	June 25, 2026
