= 1963–64 Yorkshire Football League =

The 1963–64 Yorkshire Football League was the 38th season in the history of the Yorkshire Football League, a football competition in England. Division Three was disbanded at the end of the season.

== Division One ==
Yorkshire Football League Division One
- Season: 1963-64
- Champions: Bridlington Trinity
- Relegated: Doncaster United; Norton Woodseats; Stocksbridge Works; Swallownest Miners Welfare
- Matches played: 240
- Goals scored: 822 (3.43 per match)

Division One featured 12 clubs which competed in the previous season, along with four new clubs, promoted from Division Two:

- Hull Brunswick
- Mexborough Town
- Swillington Miners Welfare
- Wombwell Sporting Association

=== League table ===
Pos	Team	Pld	W	D	L	GF	GA	GR	Pts	Qualification or relegation
1	Bridlington Trinity	30	18	6	6	76	42	1.810	42	
2	Mexborough Town	30	19	2	9	79	53	1.491	40	
3	Harrogate Town	30	15	6	9	53	29	1.828	36	
4	Bridlington Town	30	14	6	10	50	37	1.351	34	
5	Ossett Albion	30	12	10	8	47	37	1.270	34	
6	Scarborough reserves	30	16	2	12	70	64	1.094	34	
7	Farsley Celtic	30	13	7	10	51	35	1.457	33	
8	Wombwell Sporting Association	30	13	5	12	40	35	1.143	31	
9	Hull Brunswick	30	9	9	12	47	62	0.758	27	
10	Hallam	30	12	3	15	40	61	0.656	27	
11	Selby Town	30	10	6	14	55	71	0.775	26	
12	Swillington Miners Welfare	30	10	6	14	45	64	0.703	26	
13	Swallownest Miners Welfare	30	9	6	15	50	57	0.877	24	Relegated to Division Two
14	Stocksbridge Works	30	7	8	15	38	48	0.792	22	Relegated to Division Two
15	Norton Woodseats	30	9	4	17	44	67	0.657	22	Relegated to Division Two
16	Doncaster United	30	8	6	16	37	60	0.617	22	Relegated to Division Two

Source: fchd
Rules for classification: 1) points; 2) goal difference; 3) number of goals scored.
The points system until the 1990–91 season: 2 points for a win, 1 point for a draw and 0 points for losing.

=== Map ===
Location of the clubs in the 1963-64 Yorkshire League Division One on a map of Yorkshire and the Humber

== Division Two ==
Yorkshire Football League Division Two
- Season: 1963-64
- Champions: Rawmarsh Welfare
- Promoted: Brodsworth Miners Welfare; Harrogate Railway Athletic; Hatfield Main; Rawmarsh Welfare
- Matches played: 210
- Goals scored: 908 (4.32 per match)

Division Two featured ten clubs which competed in the previous season, along with five new clubs.

- Clubs relegated from Division One:
  - Goole Town reserves
  - Grimethorpe Miners Welfare
  - Hatfield Main
  - Yorkshire Amateur
- Plus:
  - Kiveton Park, from the East Derbyshire League

Also, Brodsworth Main changed name to Brodsworth Miners Welfare.

=== League table ===
Pos	Team	Pld	W	D	L	GF	GA	GR	Pts	Qualification or relegation
1	Rawmarsh Welfare	28	19	2	7	88	51	1.725	40	Promoted to Division One
2	Hatfield Main	28	19	1	8	71	35	2.029	39	Promoted to Division One
3	Harrogate Railway Athletic	28	18	3	7	69	39	1.769	39	Promoted to Division One
4	Brodsworth Miners Welfare	28	17	4	7	86	49	1.755	38	Promoted to Division One
5	Yorkshire Amateur	28	16	4	8	66	48	1.375	36	
6	Sheffield	28	15	6	7	65	48	1.354	36	
7	Goole Town reserves	28	15	4	9	57	48	1.188	34	
8	Kiveton Park	28	13	3	12	69	43	1.605	29	
9	Salts	28	10	8	10	45	40	1.125	28	
10	Grimethorpe Miners Welfare	28	13	2	13	61	64	0.953	28	
11	Ossett Town	28	8	6	14	55	62	0.887	22	
12	Frickley Colliery reserves	28	7	6	15	47	61	0.770	20	
13	Thorne Colliery	28	5	6	17	53	78	0.679	16	
14	Dodworth Miners Welfare	28	3	5	20	40	106	0.377	11	Resigned from the league
15	South Kirkby Colliery	28	2	0	26	36	136	0.265	4	Resigned to the Doncaster & District Senior League

Source: fchd
Rules for classification: 1) points; 2) goal difference; 3) number of goals scored.
The points system until the 1990–91 season: 2 points for a win, 1 point for a draw and 0 points for losing.

=== Map ===
Location of the clubs in the 1963–64 Yorkshire League Division Two on a map of Yorkshire and the Humber

== Division Three ==
Yorkshire Football League Division Three
- Season: 1963-64
- Champions: Keighley Central
- Matches played: 72
- Goals scored: 272 (3.78 per match)

Division Three featured seven clubs which competed in the previous season, along with two new clubs:

- Keighley Central
- Slazengers

=== League table ===
Pos	Team	Pld	W	D	L	GF	GA	GR	Pts	Qualification or relegation
1	Keighley Central	16	12	3	1	47	13	3.615	27	Resigned from the league
2	Farsley Celtic reserves	16	10	4	2	38	16	2.375	24	Resigned from the league
3	Harrogate Town reserves	16	8	5	3	26	24	1.083	21	Resigned from the league
4	Ossett Albion reserves	16	8	1	7	29	26	1.115	17	Resigned from the league
5	Yorkshire Amateur reserves	16	6	2	8	34	32	1.063	14	Resigned from the league
6	Harrogate Railway Athletic reserves	16	5	4	7	24	34	0.706	14	Resigned from the league
7	Salts reserves	16	4	3	9	21	33	0.636	11	Resigned from the league
8	Ossett Town reserves	16	4	2	10	28	55	0.509	10	Resigned from the league
9	Slazengers	16	2	2	12	25	39	0.641	6	Resigned from the league

Source: fchd
Rules for classification: 1) points; 2) goal difference; 3) number of goals scored.
The points system until the 1990–91 season: 2 points for a win, 1 point for a draw and 0 points for losing.

=== Map ===
Location of the clubs in the 1963–64 Yorkshire League Division Three on a map of Yorkshire and the Humber

== League Cup ==
1963–64 Yorkshire Football League League Cup
Tournament details
- Country: England

=== Final ===
Farsley Celtic	5–3	Harrogate Railway Athletic
