= 1969–70 Yorkshire Football League =

The 1969–70 Yorkshire Football League was the 44th season in the history of the Yorkshire Football League, a football competition in England. At the end of this season the league expanded up to three divisions.

== Division One ==
Yorkshire Football League Division One
- Season: 1969–70
- Champions: Rawmarsh Welfare
- Relegated: Hatfield Main; Heeley Amateurs; Kiveton Park; Norton Woodseats; Swallownest Miners Welfare; Thackley
- Matches played: 306
- Goals scored: 1,025 (3.35 per match)

Division One featured 14 clubs which competed in the previous season, along with four new clubs, promoted from Division Two:

- Frecheville Community Association
- Heeley Amateurs
- Rawmarsh Welfare
- Swallownest Miners Welfare

=== League table ===
Pos	Team	Pld	W	D	L	GF	GA	GR	Pts	Qualification or relegation
1	Rawmarsh Welfare	34	26	2	6	90	39	2.308	54	
2	Bridlington Trinity	34	20	8	6	70	44	1.591	48	
3	Mexborough Town	34	20	6	8	66	41	1.610	46	
4	Farsley Celtic	34	17	10	7	55	28	1.964	44	
5	Selby Town	34	18	8	8	69	47	1.468	44	
6	Wombwell Sporting Association	34	16	9	9	69	50	1.380	41	
7	Denaby United	34	15	8	11	58	40	1.450	38	
8	Bridlington Town	34	14	9	11	68	50	1.360	37	
9	Lincoln United	34	16	5	13	58	47	1.234	37	
10	Hallam	34	13	6	15	72	76	0.947	32	
11	Ossett Albion	34	12	7	15	44	46	0.957	31	
12	Frecheville Community Association	34	12	4	18	52	54	0.963	28	
13	Thackley	34	11	5	18	37	43	0.860	27	Relegated to Division Two
14	Swallownest Miners Welfare	34	10	5	19	46	70	0.657	25	Relegated to Division Two
15	Norton Woodseats	34	8	9	17	46	87	0.529	25	Relegated to Division Two
16	Hatfield Main	34	7	6	21	41	73	0.562	20	Relegated to Division Two
17	Kiveton Park	34	6	6	22	39	100	0.390	18	Relegated to Division Two
18	Heeley Amateurs	34	5	7	22	45	90	0.500	17	Relegated to Division Two

Source: fchd
Rules for classification: 1) points; 2) goal difference; 3) number of goals scored.
The points system until the 1990–91 season: 2 points for a win, 1 point for a draw and 0 points for losing.

=== Map ===
Location of the clubs in the 1969–70 Yorkshire League Division One on a map of Yorkshire and the Humber

== Division Two ==
Yorkshire Football League Division Two
- Season: 1969–70
- Champions: Dinnington Athletic
- Relegated: Firth Vickers; Guiseley; Hall Road Rangers; Harrogate Railway Athletic; Harrogate Town; Leeds Ashley Road; Ossett Town; Sheffield; Stocksbridge Works
- Matches played: 306
- Goals scored: 1,126 (3.68 per match)

Division Two featured eleven clubs which competed in the previous season, along with seven new clubs.

- Clubs relegated from Division One:
  - Hamptons Sports
  - Hull Brunswick
  - Thorne Colliery
- Plus:
  - Dinnington Athletic
  - Emley
  - Firth Vickers
  - North Ferriby United

=== League table ===
Pos	Team	Pld	W	D	L	GF	GA	GR	Pts	Qualification or relegation
1	Dinnington Athletic	34	24	7	3	91	37	2.459	55	
2	Emley	34	23	4	7	79	29	2.724	50	
3	North Ferriby United	34	20	9	5	95	46	2.065	49	
4	Hull Brunswick	34	20	6	8	103	52	1.981	46	
5	Scarborough reserves	34	17	7	10	75	47	1.596	41	
6	Yorkshire Amateur	34	14	9	11	57	54	1.056	37	
7	Brodsworth Miners Welfare	34	15	5	14	60	59	1.017	35	
8	Thorne Colliery	34	15	5	14	76	84	0.905	35	
9	Stocksbridge Works	34	14	6	14	67	66	1.015	34	Relegated to Division Three
10	Harrogate Town	34	12	10	12	40	54	0.741	34	Relegated to Division Three
11	Sheffield	34	9	12	13	41	51	0.804	30	Relegated to Division Three
12	Guiseley	34	10	8	16	68	83	0.819	28	Relegated to Division Three
13	Hamptons Sports	34	11	5	18	60	84	0.714	27	Resigned from the league
14	Harrogate Railway Athletic	34	10	7	17	39	55	0.709	27	Relegated to Division Three
15	Firth Vickers	34	11	4	19	54	88	0.614	26	Relegated to Division Three
16	Leeds Ashley Road	34	9	5	20	47	84	0.560	23	Relegated to Division Three
17	Hall Road Rangers	34	8	6	20	45	79	0.570	22	Relegated to Division Three
18	Ossett Town	34	3	7	24	29	74	0.392	13	Relegated to Division Three

Source: fchd
Rules for classification: 1) points; 2) goal difference; 3) number of goals scored.
The points system until the 1990–91 season: 2 points for a win, 1 point for a draw and 0 points for losing.

=== Map ===
Location of the clubs in the 1969–70 Yorkshire League Division Two on a map of Yorkshire and the Humber

== League Cup ==
1969–70 Yorkshire Football League League Cup
Tournament details
- Country: England

=== Final ===
Emley	2–0	Rawmarsh Welfare
