= Welcome to Wrexham =

2022 American sports documentary series

- Poster for Season 1
- Also known as: Welcome to Wrexhamland (Note: For the 3rd episode of 4th season only.)
- Genre: Sports access-all-areas docuseries
- Starring: Rob McElhenney; Ryan Reynolds; Humphrey Ker; Shaun Harvey; Fleur Robinson; Michael Williamson; Phil Parkinson; Paul Mullin; Jordan Davies; Aaron Hayden; Ollie Palmer; Steven Fletcher; Elliot Lee; Ollie Rathbone; Jacob Mendy; Arthur Okonkwo; Gemma Owen; Rosie Hughes; Lili Jones; Phoebe Davies
- Opening theme: "The Times They Are a-Changin'" by Keb' Mo' (season 1, episodes 1–2, 18); "Everyday" by Buddy Holly (season 1, episodes 3–6, 8–17); "Don't Forget" by Jon Hume (season 2–present); "Chasing Down Gold" by Daniel Farrant, James Knight and Romy Florin (season 2, episode 15)
- Composer: Giosuè Greco
- Country of origin: United States
- Original language: English
- No. of seasons: 5
- No. of episodes: 57

Production
- Executive producers: Rob McElhenney; Ryan Reynolds; Josh Drisko; Bryan Rowlan; Jeff Luini; Humphrey Ker; Nicholas Frenkel; George Dewey; Andrew Fried; Dane Lillegard; Sarina Roma; Andy Thomas; John Henion; Jordan Wynn
- Producers: Drew Palombi; Jeff Luini; Aaron Lovell
- Production locations: United States; United Kingdom
- Cinematography: Craig Hastings; Nick Mahar; Alastair McKevitt; Charlie Anderson; Bryan Rowland
- Editors: Josh Drisko; Bryan Rowland; Michael Anthony Brown; Mohamed El Manasterly; Curtis McConnell; Peter Holmes; Janak Elise Cox; Peter Leininger; Marcella Serrano; Steve Welch; Tim Wilsbach; Michael Oliver; Matt Wafaie; Brian Anton; Charles Little; Jenny Krochmal
- Running time: 20–47 minutes
- Production companies: Boardwalk Pictures; DN2 Productions; Maximum Effort; 3 Arts Entertainment; FXP

Original release
- Network: FX
- Release: August 24, 2022 – June 26, 2025
- Network: FXX; Hulu
- Release: May 14, 2026 – present

Related
- Necaxa

Welcome to Wrexham is an American sports documentary television series that premiered on August 24, 2022, on FX. The series documents the events of Welsh association football club Wrexham A.F.C. after its purchase by new owners, Ryan Reynolds and Rob McElhenney. The series received critical acclaim, winning eleven Primetime Emmy Awards and two Critics' Choice Television Awards. Its fourth season premiered on May 15, 2025, and a fifth season was announced days later.

In April 2026, the show was renewed for three more seasons, taking the show through 2029.

== Background ==
In September 2020, American actor Rob McElhenney and Canadian-American actor Ryan Reynolds announced their intention to buy Wrexham A.F.C., a Welsh professional association football club based in the Racecourse Ground in Wrexham, North East Wales in the United Kingdom. The company RR McReynolds was set up by November 2020, and the deal was completed in February 2021. As of the purchase, Wrexham A.F.C. played in the National League, the fifth tier of the English football league system, below the Premier League and the three tiers of the English Football League.

At the time, the team was described to be "struggling": Management before 2011 was described to have "mismanaged the club to the point of near collapse", with fans "starting to fall out of love with it". The club was served with a winding-up order in 2011. Following the suspension of the 2019–20 National League in March 2020 after the outbreak of the COVID-19 pandemic in the United Kingdom, Wrexham A.F.C. was said to have furloughed staff and players, and the club was experiencing a "threat to the[ir] continued existence". Prior to the pair's purchase, Wrexham A.F.C. was owned by the Wrexham Supporter's Trust, a fan-operated company, since 2011. The trust approved McElhenney and Reynolds' £2 million takeover by 98.6%. Following the purchase, Wrexham A.F.C.'s Twitter account posted a skit with McElhenney and Reynolds performing a parody advert for Ifor Williams Trailers, then the only sponsor for Wrexham A.F.C. McElhenney and Reynolds attended their first ever game since becoming the club's new owners at Maidenhead, a 3–2 defeat in October 2021.

The series is said to be inspired by Sunderland 'Til I Die, which prompted McElhenney to be interested in buying an association football club, as well as the influence of Humphrey Ker, who was also interested in purchasing a club. Ker was said to have been always watching association football in the writer's room of McElhenney's show Mythic Quest, causing McElhenney to become interested as well, particularly "the idea of promotion and demotion", which McElhenney said was "incredible to me". McElhenney also joked that he only had "TV money" and needed "superhero, movie star money". Ker described himself as "Rob and Ryan's representative" to the club as the pair's inside operations person. The inspiration for the documentary series came from McElhenney's viewing of Chef's Table, Last Chance U and Cheer, and his subsequent realization that all of those were produced by Boardwalk Pictures, who he approached to partner with.

== Synopsis ==
The series is based on the Hollywood pair's attempts to revive the third-oldest professional association football team in the world, founded in 1864, and how the team has performed under the pair's ownership. The pair had no prior experience in managing a sports team. The series also highlights the pair's hopes of improving the team and bringing positive change to the local Wrexham community. The style of the series is irreverent and from time to time it is openly critical of the two Co-Chairmen and their team, presenting them struggling with the Welsh language, and making mistakes.

During and since the takeover, Wrexham rose in the rankings of the National League. In the 2019–20 National League (prior to any talk of a takeover), Wrexham A.F.C. were 20th, and by the 2020–21 season, Wrexham rose to eighth place. In the 2021–22 season, the first full season under the new ownership, and the focus of the first season of the TV show, Wrexham finished in 2nd. However, despite a successful season, they missed out on promotion to the fourth-tier EFL League Two after being knocked out in the semi-finals of the promotion play-off and remained in the fifth-tier National League for the 2022–23 season.

In the second season of the series, the team successfully secures promotion to the EFL League Two during the 2022–23 season and in the third season of the show, filmed during the 2023–24 season, they win a back-to-back promotion to EFL League One. In the fourth season, based on the 2024-25 season, the team wins promotion to the EFL Championship.

In addition to following the highs and lows of the Wrexham men's team, the series follows fans of the club and characters from the City of Wrexham. It includes the people working behind the scenes for the club, and from time to time follows the personal lives of some of the players. Emotive issues such as autism, bereavement, divorce, mental health, football hooliganism, cancer, stillbirth, disability and injuries ending players' careers are featured through following the lives of different individuals involved with the club. The series explains basic football terms and rules for a US audience, along with occasional Welsh words and British phrases. From the second season, the women's team is also featured.

== Cast ==
- Rob McElhenney and Ryan Reynolds, as the two Wrexham A.F.C. co-owners & chairmans, as well as the executive producers of the show
- Humphrey Ker as Wrexham A.F.C. executive director and executive producer
- Rob Lainton, Christian Dibble, Luke Young, Jordan Davies, Paul Mullin, Aaron Hayden, Ollie Palmer, Ben Tozer, Elliot Lee, Mark Howard, Jacob Mendy, Anthony Forde, Ben Foster, James McClean, Steven Fletcher, Arthur Okonkwo, Max Cleworth, Ollie Rathbone, Sam Smith, Danny Ward, Nathan Broadhead, Lewis O'Brien, Josh Windass, and Kieffer Moore, as men's team players
- Rob Clarke, Shaun Winter, Annette Gardner, Sam Halton, Julie Birrell, Jacqui Valentine, Arthur Massey, Millie Tipping, Oliver Stephen, and Archie White, as Wrexham A.F.C. supporters
- Bob McElhenney as father of Rob McElhenney (seasons 1–2 and 5)
- Bryn Law as a football commentator and Wrexham A.F.C. fan (seasons 1–2 and 5)
- Shaun Harvey as Wrexham A.F.C. advisor to the board
- Wayne Jones as the owner of The Turf pub at the corner of the Racecourse Ground stadium where Wrexham A.F.C. was founded in 1864
- Spencer Harris as former Wrexham A.F.C. director (season 1)
- Phil Parkinson as Wrexham A.F.C. manager
- Steve Parkin as Wrexham A.F.C. assistant manager
- Fleur Robinson (seasons 1–2) and Michael Williamson (season 4–present) as Wrexham A.F.C. chief executives
- Kerry Evans as Wrexham A.F.C. disability liaison officer (seasons 1–3)
- Mark Griffiths as Wrexham A.F.C. match commentator since 1988
- Paul Chaloner as Wrexham A.F.C. head groundsman (seasons 1–2 and 5)
- Michael Hett and Mark Jones as The Declan Swans band members
- Kevin Mulholland as Wrexham A.F.C. head of medical & sports science and head of performance & medicine
- Neil Roberts (father of Mia Roberts; seasons 2–3) and Mickey Thomas (seasons 2 and 5) as former men's team players
- Aidan Davison as Wrexham A.F.C. goalkeeping coach (seasons 2 and 5)
- Macaulay Langstaff as Notts County F.C. player (seasons 2–3)
- Rosie Hughes, Lili Jones, Mia Roberts, Del Morgan, Kim Dutton, and Phoebe Davies, as women's team players
- Gemma Owen as Wrexham A.F.C. head of women's football operations (season 2–present)
- Steve Dale (seasons 2–4) and Jenny Sugarman (season 5) as women's team managers
- Chris Johnson as Wrexham A.F.C. head of recruitment (season 3)
- Katrina Jones as Wrexham A.F.C. caretaker (season 5)

== Episodes ==
| Season | Episodes | Originally released | | |
| Season | Episodes | First released | Last released | Network |
|---|---|---|---|---|
| 1 | 18 | August 24, 2022 | October 12, 2022 | FX |
| 2 | 15 | September 12, 2023 | November 14, 2023 | FX |
| 3 | 8 | May 2, 2024 | June 13, 2024 | FX |
| 4 | 8 | May 15, 2025 | June 26, 2025 | FX |
| 5 | 8 | May 14, 2026 | June 25, 2026 | FXX; Hulu |

== Production ==
=== Development ===
The series is produced by Boardwalk Pictures, the company also behind Last Chance U and Chef's Table. Maximum Effort, a film company founded by Reynolds is also co-producing and marketing the series. With More Better Productions and 3 Arts Entertainment also involved in production. FX commissioned the first two seasons of the show. McElhenney confirmed plans for a second season, following the full release of the first, on October 13, 2022. The executive producers of the series were stated to be Rob McElhenney, Ryan Reynolds, Nick Frenkel, John Henion, Andrew Fried, Dane Lillegard, Jeff Luini, Bryan Rowland, Josh Drisko, George Dewey, Andy Thomas, Jordan Wynn and Sarina Roma. Henion was also the showrunner for season 1, with Bryan Rowland and Josh Drisko being showrunners for season 2. A fifth season was announced shortly after the fourth premiered in May 2025.

Alex Webb of Bloomberg News estimated that the first season of the show would bring Reynolds and McElhenney a revenue of £600,000, which would have contributed considerably to the club's budget that year.

=== Filming ===
Filming for the docuseries began in December 2020, with the film crew appearing alongside the owners' first visit to the team at the Wrexham v. Maidenhead United F.C. match in October 2021. In an interview with Variety, Reynolds admitted that he was initially uncomfortable with the all-access documentary setting. Discussions about dismissals of players were recorded on camera, but were ultimately cut, to keep focus on the effect of the decisions on the players, rather than on the executives making the decisions.

=== Post-production ===
For Season 1, sound recordings for the matches were done with single mono microphones, which were then mixed in post to sound wider and represent the larger crowds better; Season 2 featured full surround sound recordings. Editors found the first episode of the show challenging to plan, and ended up leaving most of the footage from the 2020–2021 season on the cutting room floor. The editors room had a mix of football fans and non-fans, which helped with balancing the match highlights with the human stories.

== Marketing ==
=== Season 1 ===
The all-access "fly on the wall" docuseries was first announced by McElhenney and Reynolds on May 18, 2021. Later that month, an announcement trailer for the series was released onto Reynolds' YouTube channel, titled "Welcome to Wrexham". The roughly two-minute parody sketch comedy involves McElhenney and Reynolds announcing the docuseries, as well as former BBC News and S4C journalist Maxine Hughes, who acts as a "pretty disgruntled" Welsh language translator for the pair, but adds some "creative" translations to the pair's words.

In December 2021, FX released a video promo for the series, titled "It's Never Sunny in Wrexham". The short 30-second clip involved lookalikes of the It's Always Sunny in Philadelphia cast, including a Danny DeVito lookalike, set inside the Turf Hotel located next to Wrexham A.F.C's Racecourse Ground. In the clip, the lookalike cast looks confusingly at a television screen showing the true cast of the American series starring McElhenney, staring back from their Philadelphia Irish bar. The clip also includes the two owners. The scenes involving the lookalike cast and the two owners were filmed in October 2021 as the two owners visited Wrexham. When the lookalike of Danny DeVito visited Wrexham, he was confused for the real actor. Describing the series, Nick Grad, FX Entertainment's original programming president said "Rob and Ryan will take fans inside the sport as never before, pairing their genuine love for the game with the welcome challenge of building on the heritage of this club".

On July 20, 2022, the official trailer for the program was released. The series' official synopsis read "From Hollywood to Wales, from the pitch to the locker room, the front office to the pub, Welcome to Wrexham will track Rob and Ryan's crash course in football club ownership and the inextricably connected fates of a team and a town counting on two actors to bring some serious hope and change to a community that could use it".

The Walt Disney Company, which owns FX as well as the sports network ESPN, moved three FA Cup matches involving Wrexham to networks ESPN2 and ESPNews to help promote the series.

=== Season 2 ===
The first teaser trailer for the second season was aired during the half time of Wrexham's pre-season game against Chelsea on July 19, 2023. On July 22, it was officially announced that the season would begin airing on September 12.

== Release ==
=== Broadcast ===
In May 2022, FX Networks announced that Welcome to Wrexham would premiere with two episodes on August 24, 2022, in the United States on FX. A week after the release of the first season's final episode, Rob McElhenney and Ryan Reynolds confirmed on Twitter that a second season was in development. The second season was officially confirmed by Disney in April 2023 following Wrexham's promotion to EFL League Two. The season premiered on September 12, 2023, in the United States. On November 14, 2023, Wrexham AFC announced that a third season was in development. Unlike the first two seasons, season three was scheduled to air in the spring to align more closely with contemporary events affecting the club.

=== Streaming ===
In the United States, Welcome to Wrexham was made available to stream on FX on Hulu on August 25, 2022, with the first two episodes released together. Internationally, the series premiered on Disney+ on the same date, also with the first two episodes released together. The second season was released on Hulu and Disney+ on September 13, 2023, with subsequent episodes released weekly. The third season was made available for streaming on Hulu on May 3, 2024, with new episodes released weekly on Hulu and internationally on Disney+ on the same date. The fourth season was released on Hulu on May 16, 2025, with new episodes released weekly on Hulu until June 26, and internationally on Disney+ on the same date.

The streaming aggregator Reelgood, which tracks real-time data from 5 million U.S. users for original and acquired content across SVOD and AVOD services, reported that Welcome to Wrexham was the seventh most watched program across all platforms during the week of September 2, 2022. The series ranked No. 2 on Hulu's "Top 15 Today" list—a daily updated list of the platform's most-watched titles—on September 14, 2023. Market research company Parrot Analytics, which looks at consumer engagement in consumer research, streaming, downloads, and on social media, announced that Welcome to Wrexham was one of the most in-demand documentary series of 2024.

== Reception ==
=== Critical response ===
For the first season, the review aggregator website Rotten Tomatoes reported a 91% approval rating with an average rating of 7/10, based on 33 critic reviews. The website's critics' consensus reads, "Plunking two famous funnymen into the unpredictable journey of a sports documentary, Welcome to Wrexham is a calculated gamble that pays off." Metacritic, which uses a weighted average, assigned a score of 75 out of 100 based on 16 critics, indicating "generally favorable reviews".

For the second season, Rotten Tomatoes reported a 91% approval rating with an average rating of 7.3/10, based on 22 critic reviews. The website's critics consensus reads, "While its marquee stars are plenty welcoming all their own, Wrexham smartly spends its sophomore season focused on the community itself to inspiring effect." Metacritic assigned a score of 78 out of 100 based on 12 critics, indicating "generally favorable reviews".

For the third season, Rotten Tomatoes reported a 100% approval rating, based on 7 critic reviews.

For the fourth season, Rotten Tomatoes reported a 100% approval rating, based on 6 critic reviews.

Author Cleo Watson has compared the 2023 Jilly Cooper novel Tackle! to the programme.

=== Ratings ===
Early broadcasts in September and October 2022 recorded total viewership (P2+) between 203,000 and 282,000, with 18–49 demographic viewers ranging from 91,300 to 130,500. By June 2024, episodes attracted between 151,000 and 193,000 total viewers (0.05%–0.06% rating), with 39,500 to 65,900 viewers aged 18–49. In 2025, viewership ranged from 108,000 to 219,000 (0.03%–0.07% rating), with 18–49 viewers between 19,000 and 78,000. The June 26, 2025 broadcast had 174,000 total viewers (0.05% rating), including 40,500 in the 18–49 demographic, marking a 35% increase from June 12, 2025, when 129,000 viewers were recorded. Household viewership during this period varied from 75,500 to 163,500, with ratings between 0.06% and 0.13%.

=== Accolades ===
Accolades received by Welcome to Wrexham
| Award | Year | Category | Nominee(s) | Result | Ref. |
|---|---|---|---|---|---|
| American Cinema Editors Awards | 2025 | Best Edited Non-Scripted Series | Tim Wilsbach, Steve Welch, Michael Brown, Michael Oliver, Tim Roche, Matt Wafaie, and Jenny Krochmal (for "Temporary") | Won | |
| Cinema Audio Society Awards | 2023 | Outstanding Achievement in Sound Mixing for Television – Non-Fiction, Variety, or Music/Series or Specials | Mark Jensen (for "Ballers") | Nominated | |
| Critics' Choice Documentary Awards | 2022 | Best Sports Documentary | Welcome to Wrexham | Won | |
| Critics' Choice Documentary Awards | 2022 | Best Ongoing Documentary Series | Welcome to Wrexham | Nominated | |
| Critics' Choice Documentary Awards | 2023 | Best Sports Documentary | Welcome to Wrexham | Nominated | |
| Critics' Choice Documentary Awards | 2023 | Best Ongoing Documentary Series | Welcome to Wrexham | Nominated | |
| Critics' Choice Real TV Awards | 2023 | Best Sports Show | Welcome to Wrexham | Won | |
| Guild of Music Supervisors Awards | 2023 | Best Music Supervision for a Docuseries | Andrea von Foerster | Nominated | |
| Primetime Creative Arts Emmy Awards | 2023 | Outstanding Unstructured Reality Program | John Henion, Andrew Fried, Sarina Roma, Dane Lillegard, Nicholas Frenkel, George Dewey, Rob McElhenney, Ryan Reynolds, and Humphrey Ker | Won | |
| Primetime Creative Arts Emmy Awards | 2023 | Outstanding Cinematography for a Reality Program | Alastair McKevitt, Craig Hastings, Leighton Cox and Jason Bulley (for "Do or Die") | Won | |
| Primetime Creative Arts Emmy Awards | 2023 | Outstanding Directing for a Reality Program | Bryan Rowland (for "Wide World of Wales") | Won | |
| Primetime Creative Arts Emmy Awards | 2023 | Outstanding Picture Editing for an Unstructured Reality Program | Mohamed El Manasterly, Curtis McConnell, Michael Brown, Charles Little, and Bryan Rowland (for "Do or Die") | Won | |
| Primetime Creative Arts Emmy Awards | 2023 | Outstanding Sound Mixing for a Reality Program (Single or Multi-Camera) | Mark Jensen (for "Do or Die") | Won | |
| Primetime Creative Arts Emmy Awards | 2023 | Outstanding Sound Editing for a Nonfiction or Reality Program (Single or Multi-Camera) | Will Harp, Jon Schell, and Shaun Cromwell (for "Do or Die") | Nominated | |
| Primetime Creative Arts Emmy Awards | 2024 | Outstanding Unstructured Reality Program | Josh Drisko, Bryan Rowland, Jeff Luini, Alan Bloom, Andrew Fried, Sarina Roma, Dane Lillegard, Nicholas Frenkel, George Dewey, Rob McElhenney, Ryan Reynolds, Humphrey Ker, Miloš Balać, Patrick McGarvey, Aaron Lovell, Shannon Owen and Liz Spano | Won | |
| Primetime Creative Arts Emmy Awards | 2024 | Outstanding Cinematography for a Reality Program | Craig Hastings, Ed Edwards, James Melrose, Craig Murdoch, Verdy Oliver, Esther Vardy, Leighton Cox, Tom Reece, Gareth Roberts, Joe Clifford, Joby Newson, Mike Staniforth, and Dillon Scheps | Nominated | |
| Primetime Creative Arts Emmy Awards | 2024 | Outstanding Directing for a Reality Program | Bryan Rowland (for "Shaun's Vacation") | Nominated | |
| Primetime Creative Arts Emmy Awards | 2024 | Outstanding Picture Editing for an Unstructured Reality Program | Michael Brown, Josh Drisko, Michael Oliver, Bryan Rowland, and Steve Welch (for "Up the Town?") | Won | |
| Primetime Creative Arts Emmy Awards | 2024 | Outstanding Sound Mixing for a Reality Program (Single or Multi-Camera) | Mark Jensen (for "Giant Killers") | Won | |
| Primetime Creative Arts Emmy Awards | 2024 | Outstanding Sound Editing for a Nonfiction or Reality Program (Single or Multi-Camera) | Shaun Cromwell, William Harp, Jon Schell, and Sean Gray (for "Goals") | Nominated | |
| Primetime Creative Arts Emmy Awards | 2025 | Outstanding Unstructured Reality Program | Jeff Luini, Bryan Rowland, Josh Drisko, Andy Thomas, Andrew Fried, Sarina Roma, Dane Lillegard, Nicholas Frenkel, George Dewey, Rob McElhenney, Ryan Reynolds, Humphrey Ker, Charlotte Hobday, Patrick McGarvey, Cody Shelton, Sandy Johnston, Liz Spano, Aaron Lovell, and Shannon Owen | Nominated | |
| Primetime Creative Arts Emmy Awards | 2025 | Outstanding Picture Editing for an Unstructured Reality Program | Sam Fricke, Jenny Krochmal, Mohamed el Manasterly, Michael Oliver, Tim Roche, Matt Wafaie, Steve Welch, and Tim Wilsbach (for "Down to the Wire") | Won | |
| Primetime Creative Arts Emmy Awards | 2025 | Outstanding Sound Mixing for a Reality Program (Single or Multi-Camera) | Mark Jensen (for "Down to the Wire") | Won | |
| Primetime Creative Arts Emmy Awards | 2026 | Outstanding Cinematography for a Reality Program | Leighton Cox, Ed Edwards, Verdy Oliver, Tom Reece, Kieren Startup (for "Do A Wrexham") | Nominated | |
| Primetime Creative Arts Emmy Awards | 2026 | Outstanding Picture Editing for an Unstructured Reality Program | Michael Oliver, Matt Wafaie, Thomas Czupryna, Asher Glaser, Jenny Krochmal, Mohamed El Manasterly, Stacie Schwarz, Steve Welch (for "Do A Wrexham") | Nominated | |
| Primetime Creative Arts Emmy Awards | 2026 | Outstanding Unstructured Reality Program | Welcome to Wrexham | Nominated | |
| Primetime Creative Arts Emmy Awards | 2026 | Outstanding Sound Mixing for a Reality Program | Mark Jensen (for "Do A Wrexham") | Won | |
| Television Critics Association Awards | 2023 | Outstanding Achievement in Reality Programming | Welcome to Wrexham | Nominated | |
| Television Critics Association Awards | 2024 | Outstanding Achievement in Reality Programming | Welcome to Wrexham | Nominated | |
| Producers Guild of America Awards | 2024 | Outstanding Producer of Non-Fiction Television | Welcome to Wrexham | Won | |

== Spinoff series ==
Necaxa's backers purchased 5% of Wrexham AFC in April 2024 and Wrexham's owners Rob McElhenney and Ryan Reynolds, purchased a minority stake in Necaxa.

On July 9, 2024, a documentary series similar to Welcome to Wrexham was ordered from FX and Disney+ Latin America to follow Necaxa's attempt to become one of Mexico's top teams again. It will feature McElhenney, Reynolds, and Eva Longoria, one of Necaxa's investors, as executive producers and stars. Filming began on the same day. Necaxa premiered on FXX on August 7, 2025.
