= Johnny Mooney (footballer) =

Scottish footballer and manager (1926–2000)

Personal information
- Full name: John Mooney
- Date of birth: 21 February 1926
- Place of birth: Fauldhouse, Scotland
- Date of death: July 2000 (aged 74)
- Place of death: Doncaster, England
- Position: Outside right

Youth career
- Cleland

Senior career*
Years	Team	Apps	(Gls)
1948–1953	Hamilton Academical	75	(20)
1953–1959	Doncaster Rovers	168	(32)
1959–1961	Boston United	64	(26)

Managerial career
- Doncaster United
- * Club domestic league appearances and goals

John Mooney (21 February 1926 – July 2000) was a Scottish footballer who played as an outside right, for Hamilton Academical, Doncaster Rovers, and Boston United.

Mooney started off playing for Cleland and then in 1948 he was signed by Hamilton Academical manager Jimmy McStay to play in the Scottish Football League Division B.

== Senior club career ==
=== Hamilton Academical ===
His first game for Hamilton was on 14 August 1948 against Strirling Albion. He went on to play in 15 league matches that season, scoring 2 goals. The following season saw him scoring 8 goals in 27 league games, including a hat-trick in a 4–0 home win against Alloa Athletic on 11 March 1950.

In subsequent seasons Mooney scored 2 in 4 league games, 8 in 24, and then 0 in 5 as Hamilton came second in the league gaining promotion to Division A.

In November 1952, Lincoln City nearly signed him. In April 1953, following Hamilton's promotion, Mooney was released by the club on a free transfer.

=== Doncaster Rovers ===
As a free agent, Mooney was signed in May 1953 by English second division club Doncaster Rovers, his debut being in a 1–0 victory at Bristol Rovers on 24 August 1953 in front of a 28,117 crowd. Only 8 games with no goals in that first season, the following one he figured more with 6 goals in 32 league matches and 2 in 7 FA Cup ties.

The 1955–56 season proved more successful, with 12 goals in his 45 League and FA Cup games. In May 1956, Mooney scored in the 4–0 victory over Sheffield United in the Sheffield & Hallamshire County Cup final at Belle Vue.

In the 1956–57 season, he scored a hat-trick in a 4–0 win over Fulham.

=== Boston United ===
Following his release by Doncaster after the 1958–59 relegation season, Mooney moved on to play for Boston United in the Southern League until the end of their 1960-61 relegation season.

== Honours ==
Doncaster Rovers

- Sheffield & Hallamshire County Cup Winner 1956

== Personal life and death ==
After his retirement from the professional game, Mooney managed amateur side Doncaster United and worked at British Ropes in Doncaster.

Mooney died in Doncaster in July 2000, at the age of 74.
