= South Yorkshire Amateur Football League =

- Founded: 1933
- Folded: 2016
- Country: England

The South Yorkshire Amateur Football League was a football competition for clubs in the Sheffield area of England. The competition was administered by the Sheffield and Hallamshire Football Association.

== Honours ==
=== League champions ===
| Season | |
|---|---|
| 1933–34 | Rotherham Broom Sports |
| 1934–35 | Rotherham YMCA |
| 1935–36 | Rotherham YMCA |
| 1936–37 | A Rotherham YMCA; B Old Firparnians |
| 1937–38 | A Fulwood; B Penistone Church |
| 1938–39 | A Fulwood; B Woodseats Methodists |
| 1939–40 | Not played due to WWII |
| 1940–41 | Not played due to WWII |
| 1941–42 | Not played due to WWII |
| 1942–43 | Not played due to WWII |
| 1943–44 | Not played due to WWII |
| 1944–45 | Not played due to WWII |
| 1945–46 | Not played due to WWII |
| 1946–47 | Fulwood |
| 1947–48 | Sheffield University |
| 1948–49 | Sheffield University |

| Season | Division One | Division Two |
|---|---|---|
| 1949–50 | Sheffield Training College | Little Matlock |
| 1950–51 | Sheffield Training College | Ravens Amateur |

| Season | Division One | Division Two | Division Three |
|---|---|---|---|
| 1951–52 | Ravens Amateur | | |
| 1952–53 | Sheffield Training College | | |
| 1953–54 | Old Edwardians | Old Centralians | Croft House |
| 1954–55 | Sheffield reserves | De La Salle Old Boys | Old Cestrefeldians 'B' |
| 1955–56 | Sheffield Training College | Sheffield Transport | Greenhill |
| 1956–57 | Sheffield Training College | Sheffield University | Nether Edge Old Boys |
| 1957–58 | Sheffield Training College 'A' | Electric Sports | Holly Guild |
| 1958–59 | Old Firparnians | Hollinsend Amateurs | English Steel Corporation |
| 1959–60 | Old Firparnians | | |
| 1960–61 | Sheffield Training College | | |
| 1961–62 | Old Firparnians | Sheffield Bankers | Sheffield Bankers 'B' |

| Season | Premier Division | Division One | Division Two | Division Three |
|---|---|---|---|---|
| 1962–63 | Electricity Sports | Croft House | Hollinsend Amateurs | Oughtibridge War Memorial |
| 1963–64 | Sheffield Training College | De La Salle Old Boys | Oughtibridge War Memorial | Sheffield Teachers |
| 1964–65 | Sheffield Training College | Oughtibridge War Memorial | Sheffield Teachers | Sandersons Sports |
| 1965–66 | Sheffield Training College | Sheffield Teachers | Sandersons Sports | Colley YS |

| Season | |
|---|---|
| 1966–67 | Sheffield Training College |
| 1967–68 | Hollinsend Amateurs |
| 1968–69 | Not finished |

| Season | Premier Division | Division One | Division Two | Division Three |
|---|---|---|---|---|
| 1969–70 | Old Firparnians | Sheffield Education | Woodthorpe | Longley BC |
| 1970–71 | Old Edwardians Old Boys | Woodthorpe | Crosspool | Swan |
| 1971–72 | Abbeydale Old Boys | | | |
| 1972–73 | Crosspool | Dore | Wadsley Church | |
| 1973–74 | Crosspool | Wadsley Church | Public Works Department | |
| 1974–75 | Trustee Savings Bankers | Ash House | Club Double | Meynell Sports |
| 1975–76 | Hollinsend Amateurs | Park | Meynell Sports | Ecclesfield |
| 1976–77 | Woodbourn | Meynell Sports | Middlewood Hospital | |
| 1977–78 | Meynell Sports | Middlewood Hospital | Wadsley Bridge | Brown Bear |
| 1978–79 | Earl Francis | Old Firparnians | Stannington College | Dixcel |
| 1979–80 | Earl Francis | Stannington College 'A' | Old Cestrefeldians | Hurlfield Youth Club |
| 1980–81 | Old Edwardians | Jordanthorpe Old Boys | Hurlfield Youth Club | Gleadless |
| 1981–82 | Hollinsend Albion | Darnall | Dixcel Sports | Red Grouse |
| 1982–83 | Stannington College 'A' | Ecclesfield | Escalop | Handsworth Methodists |
| 1983–84 | Stannington College 'A' | Woodthorpe | Handsworth Methodists | Middlewood |
| 1984–85 | Hurlfield Youth Club | Red Grouse | Granville Sports 85 | Phoenix 'A' |
| 1985–86 | Sheffield Foundry WMC | Granville SP | Phoenix 'A' | DS Tooling |
| 1986–87 | Dixcel Sports | Phoenix 'A' | DS Tooling | Sheffield Academicals |
| 1987–88 | De La Salle Old Boys | Grade A Joinery | Sheffield Academicals | Midland Bank |
| 1988–89 | De La Salle Old Boys | Sheffield Gas | Midland Bank | Melchester Rovers |
| 1989–90 | Sheffield Gas | Hollinsend Albion | Melchester Rovers | Manpower Rangers |
| 1990–91 | Freedom 90 | Sheffield Medics 'A' | Stocksbridge Park Steels 3rds | Elm Tree |

| Season | Premier Division | Division One | Division Two |
|---|---|---|---|
| 1991–92 | Stannington United | Stocksbridge Park Steels 3rds | Elm Tree |
| 1992–93 | Dixcel Sports | Elm Tree | Record Tools |
| 1993–94 | Elm Tree | Burncross | Gate 13 |
| 1994–95 | Market Inn | Midland Bank | Davy reserves |
| 1995–96 | Burncross | Oughtibridge WMSC reserves | Hillsborough |
| 1996–97 | Burncross | Hillsborough | Crookes WMC |

| Season | Premier Division | Division One |
|---|---|---|
| 1997–98 | Elm Tree | Railway |
| 1998–99 | Hillsborough | Bradway |
| 1999–00 | Forum | Wombwell Main |
| 2000–01 | Hollinsend Amateurs | A Silkstone United; B Junction |
| 2001–02 | Fullflow Fairway | Jubilee Sports |
| 2002–03 | Silkstone United | Phoenix All Stars |

| Season | |
|---|---|
| 2003–04 | Cross Scythes |

| Season | Premier Division | Division One |
|---|---|---|
| 2004–05 | Jubilee Sports | Yew Tree |
| 2005–06 | Jubilee Sports | Grimethorpe Athletic |
| 2006–07 | Grimethorpe Athletic | Kiveton Park reserves |
| 2007–08 | Aston | A New Bohemians; B Sheffield West End |

| Season | Premier Division | Division One | Division Two |
|---|---|---|---|
| 2008–09 | Gleadless | Boynton Sports | Surud United |
| 2009–10 | Jubilee Sports | Sheffield Medics | Manor Castle |

| Season | Premier Division | Division One |
|---|---|---|
| 2010–11 | Gleadless | Royston |
| 2011–12 | Jubilee Sports | North Gawber Colliery |
| 2012–13 | North Gawber Colliery | Dodworth Miners Welfare |

| Season | |
|---|---|
| 2013–14 | Byron House |
| 2014–15 | Grimethorpe Sports |
| 2015–16 | Sheffield Medics |

=== League Cup finals ===
| Season | Winner | Result | Runner-up | Venue |
|---|---|---|---|---|
| 1982–83 | Darnall Wellington | | | |
| 1983–84 | Hurlfield Youth Club | | | |
| 1984–85 | Windsor reserves | | | |
| 1985–86 | Stannington College A | | | |
| 1986–87 | Jordanthorpe Old Boys A | | | |
| 1987–88 | Stannington College | | Stannington United | |
| 1988–89 | Stannington United | | Granville College | |
| 1989–90 | LDS | | Devonshire Arms | |
| 1990–91 | Elm Tree | 3–0 | Phoenix 'A' | |
| 1991–92 | Elm Tree | | New Life | |
| 1992–93 | Castle College | | | |
| 1993–94 | De La Salle Old Boys | | | |
| 1994–95 | Gate 13 | | | |
| 1995–96 | Burncross | 2–1 | Oughtibridge War Memorial SC reserves | |
| 1996–97 | Hillsborough | | | |
| 1997–98 | Hillsborough | | | |
| 1998–99 | Hillsborough | | | |
| 1999–00 | Forum | | | |
| 2000–01 | Burncross | 1–0 | Silkstone United | Woodbourn Road |
| 2001–02 | Silkstone United | | | |
| 2002–03 | Everest | 6–1 | Silkstone United | Bracken Moor |
| 2003–04 | Sheffield Bankers | 3–2 | Oxspring United | Bracken Moor |
| 2004–05 | Cross Scythes | 2–1 | Sheffield Bankers 'A' | Bracken Moor |
| 2005–06 | Grimethorpe Athletic | 3–1 | Thorncliffe | |
| 2006–07 | Grimethorpe Athletic | 1–0 | Athersley Recreation reserves | Bracken Moor |
| 2007–08 | Gleadless | 2 – 2 (3p2) | Aston | |
| 2008–09 | Furnace | 4–2 | New Bohemians | Bracken Moor |
| 2009–10 | New Bohemians | 3–1 | Gleadless | Bracken Moor |
| 2010–11 | Jubilee Sports | 2–1 | Gleadless | Bracken Moor |
| 2011–12 | North Gawber Colliery | 2–0 | Aquaforce Barnsley reserves | Bracken Moor |
| 2012–13 | North Gawber Colliery | 2–1 | Sheffield Medics | Bracken Moor |
| 2013–14 | Byron House | 3–2 | Millmoor Juniors 'A' | Bracken Moor |
| 2014–15 | Sheffield Medics | 1–0 | Brinsworth Whitehill | Bracken Moor |
| 2015–16 | Sheffield Medics | 2–1 | Euroglaze | Bracken Moor |
