= Ravens Amateur F.C. =

Ravens Amateur
- Full name: Ravens Amateur Football Club

Ravens Amateur F.C. was an English association football club from Sheffield, South Yorkshire. The club competed in the FA Amateur Cup from 1924 to 1926, and won the South Yorkshire Amateur League in 1952.
