= Fulwood A.F.C. =

Fulwood
- Full name: Fulwood Association Football Club

Fulwood A.F.C. was an English association football club from Sheffield, South Yorkshire. The club competed in the FA Amateur Cup during the 1920s, and won the South Yorkshire Amateur League in 1938, 1939 and 1947.
