= Leeds A.F.C. =

Leeds
- Full name: Leeds Association Football Club
- Founded: 1894
- Dissolved: 1898

Leeds A.F.C. was an English football club based in Leeds, West Yorkshire, England.

== History ==
The club was a founder member of the first incarnation of the Yorkshire Football League in 1897, but at the end of the season they were asked by the owners of their rented Headingley home to pay more rent, and the club was wound up.
