= Dewsbury F.C. =

Dewsbury
- Full name: Dewsbury Football Club
- Founded: 1898

Dewsbury F.C. was an English football club based in Dewsbury, West Yorkshire.

== History ==
The club was formed in 1898 in order to represent the town in the old Yorkshire Football League in 1898–99 and 1899–1900. They finished bottom of the table in both seasons but were still active well into the 1900s.
