= Briggs Sports F.C. (Doncaster) =

Briggs Sports
- Full name: Briggs Sports Football Club

Briggs Sports F.C. was an English association football club based in Doncaster, South Yorkshire. They competed in the Yorkshire Football League and FA Amateur Cup.

== History ==
=== League and cup history ===
Briggs Sports League and Cup history
Season	Division	Position	FA Amateur Cup
1952–53	Yorkshire League Division 2	10th/14	-
1953–54	Yorkshire League Division 2	9th/16	-
1954–55	Yorkshire League Division 2	12th/16	Extra Preliminary Round
1955–56	Yorkshire League Division 2	16th/16	1st Qualifying Round
1956–57	Yorkshire League Division 2	16th/17	-
