= Turf Hotel =

Pub in Wrexham, Wales

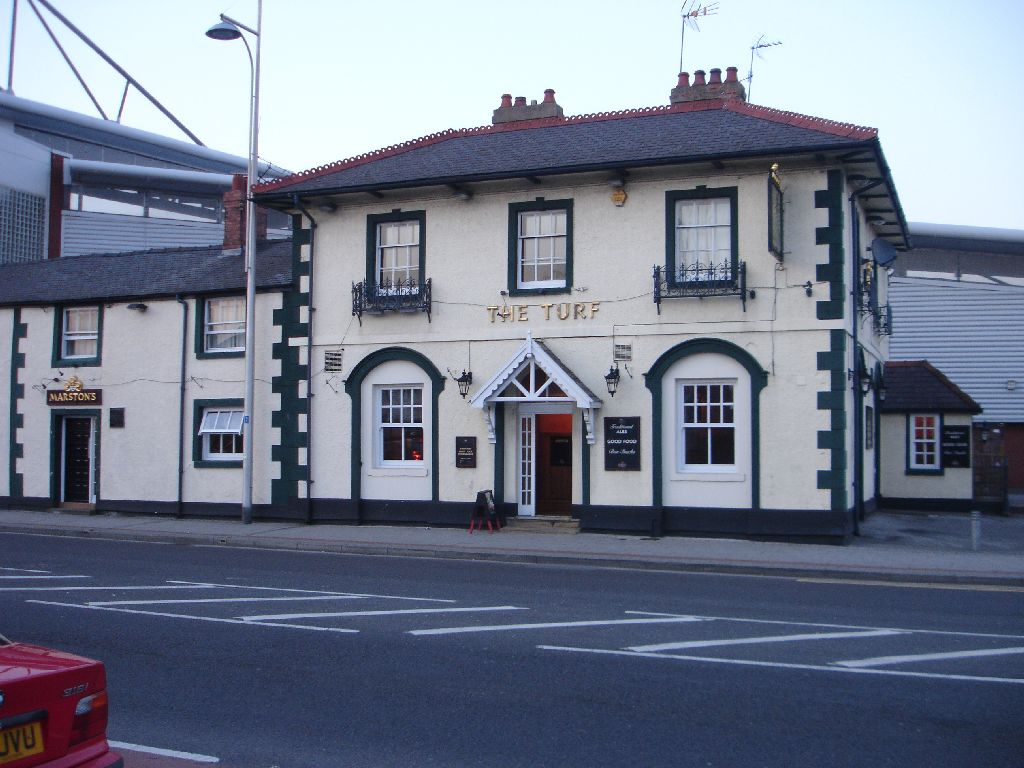
- Front of the pub on Mold Road
- Alternative names: The Turf

General information
- Type: Pub
- Location: Wrexham, Wales, Mold Road, Wrexham LL11 2AH
- Coordinates: 53.05122°N 3.00386°W

Website
- www.the-turf.co.uk

The Turf Hotel, also known as The Turf, is a public house in Wrexham, Wales, located on the corner of Wrexham A.F.C.'s Racecourse Ground. It has been a meeting place for Wrexham's fans for over 150 years. It was the only pub in the United Kingdom to be built inside the grounds of a football club and is now the oldest public house at any sport stadium in the world.

== History ==
=== The Turf Tavern and The Grandstand ===
The original "Turf Tavern" (built sometime between 1795 and 1819) occupied the lower section of the current structure, while it is believed that the upper section was built specifically for horseracing sometime after the first meeting took place at the ground on 29 September 1807. The name of this upper section is not recorded until 1822, when a parish record identifies Joseph Foulkes as the landlord of "The Grandstand" and later newspaper advertisements suggest that the establishment was specifically built 4 meters away from the tavern to provide an upmarket experience during the horseracing events. Both the Turf Tavern and The Grandstand are still identified as separate structures in tithe maps of the early 1840s.

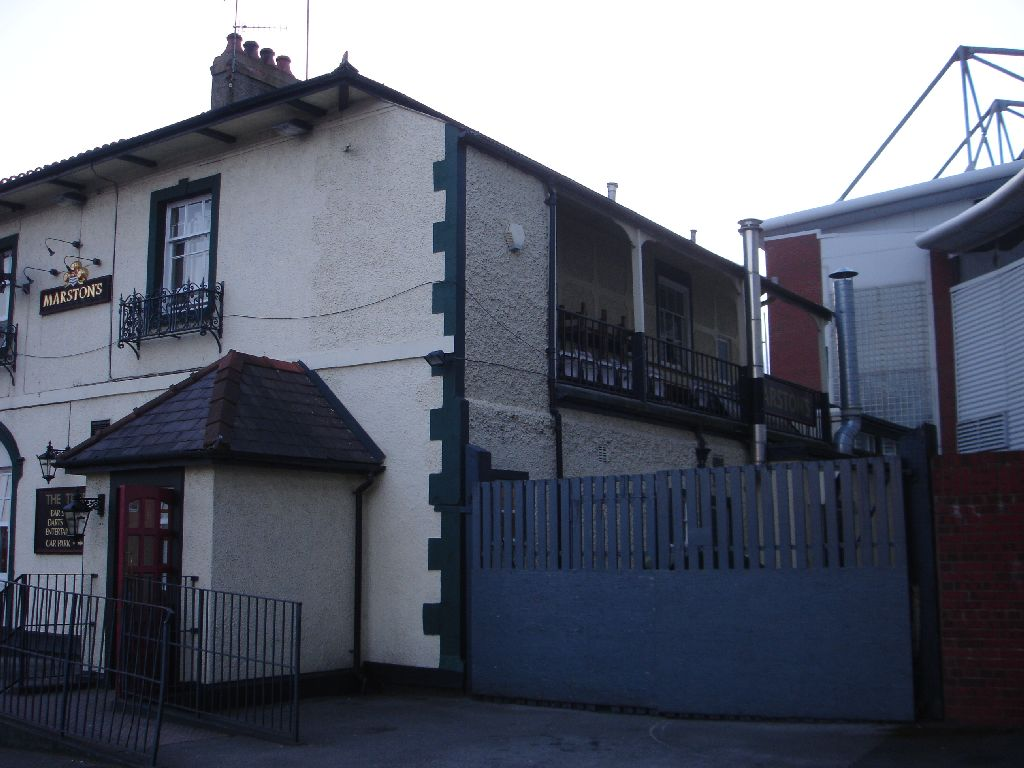
The balcony of the former Grandstand which would have provided views of the racecourse's finishing line.

Later changes (newspaper records suggest that the work took place in 1854) to the structures saw The Grandstand redeveloped with the addition of a new roof above a cantilevered bay. This allowed spectators to view the race track's finishing line while protected from the weather. Such development saw the space between the two buildings disappear, and by 1866 the single structure was recorded as the Turf Hotel.

==== Wrexham Football Club ====
On 4 October 1864 members of the Wrexham Cricket Club met at the Turf Hotel to discuss the founding of an association football club. As such, the Turf Hotel became the home of the newly formed Wrexham Football Club and an important centre for the growth of Association football in Wales.

=== Later history ===
Much of the buildings current exterior dates from 1913 when it was again renovated before the international match against Scotland. The final major renovations occurred in the mid twentieth century, the changing rooms were finally moved from the Turf Hotel to the Plas Coch stand in the late 1940s, and a bowling green was converted into a car park in the late 1960s.

In 2007 the pub was threatened with demolition as part of the revamp of Wrexham AFC's grounds, but Wales First Minister Rhodri Morgan stepped in to support its survival. The Turf was also the starting point of the Olympic Torch Relay when it visited Wrexham on 30 May 2012.

The pub, along with its owner Wayne Jones, feature on the FX series Welcome to Wrexham.

On 21 September 2026, the Wrexham A.F.C. ownership group exchanged on the purchase of The Turf from operations group Admiral Taverns in a move to "help protect the historic pub". Under the arrangement, Jones was to continue as manager of the pub.
