= Shaun Harvey =

English football executive (born 1970)

- Born: Shaun Antony Harvey; 25 February 1970 (age 56)
- Known for: Director at Wrexham, Former Chief Executive of the English Football League, Former CEO of Leeds United & MD of Bradford City

Shaun Antony Harvey (born 25 February 1970) is an English football executive. Harvey was the chief executive of the English Football League having formerly been the CEO of Leeds United, as well as a club director. He is currently a director at EFL Championship club Wrexham.

Prior to joining Leeds, Harvey was managing director at Bradford City. In June 2011, Harvey was elected to the Football League board of Directors and on 29 July 2013 became its chief executive. On 18 February 2019, he announced his resignation, effective at the end of the 2018–19 season.

== Background ==
After leaving school, he took up a job at the Guardian Royal Exchange Insurance Company. He then took up an administration job at Farsley Celtic which led to a chance meeting with Geoffrey Richmond the then chairman of Scarborough. In February 1992, Harvey took up a job at Scarborough after having been personally invited by Richmond to the club. When Richmond became chairman of Bradford City, Harvey followed him where he eventually became managing director and the club rose to the Premier League for the first time in its history.

== Career in football ==
=== Leeds United (2004–2013) ===
In June 2004, after ten years at Bradford City, Harvey joined Leeds United as chief executive officer. The new management at Leeds included Richmond who joined the club as a board advisor.

Harvey remained at Leeds United for nine years before stepping down as chief executive officer on 1 July 2013. It remains unknown who he resigned to as he testified in court he didn’t know who owned Leeds United. He was replaced by David Haigh, deputy chief executive of new owner GFH Capital, who took up the role of managing director.

=== English Football League (2011–2019) ===
In June 2011 Shaun Harvey was elected to the Football League board of directors by Championship clubs. and on 29 July 2013 he was appointed the organisation's chief executive. As chief executive, he took responsibility for the day to day administration and management of the largest single body of professional clubs in European football which includes the fourth most watched league competition, the EFL Championship, as well as Leagues One and Two, the EFL Cup and the EFL Trophy.

During his time at the EFL, Shaun Harvey has implemented a number of controversial changes to the League and its competitions. In the summer of 2016, the Football League was renamed the ‘English Football League’ as part of a comprehensive corporate and competition re-branding to give the League’s competitions a new and distinct identity, while simultaneously retaining their unique heritage.

More recent changes included a controversial change in format for the Football League Trophy. He claimed this was to give young players a chance to develop, to reinvigorate the competition and to increase prize money. This led to record low crowds and a drastic decrease in the average number of fans attending games.

He oversaw a commercial programme that generates more than £100m of revenue every season from broadcasting and sponsorship. This includes the recently launched iFollow service – a digital streaming over-the-top platform that allows the estimated 270,000 overseas fans of EFL clubs to watch their team play live.

Harvey spoke out in 2018 in favour of safe standing in principle, but against a mid-season break in EFL leagues as impractical (although he was in favour of its implementation for the Premier League).

In 2018, Shaun Harvey agreed to a live domestic broadcasting rights deal with Sky Sports worth £595 million running until 2024, the biggest in the League’s history. A majority of Championship clubs in the Football League, however, felt the deal undervalued their broadcast rights, and that it cut their revenues by removing their streaming rights to many matches. Pressure and resistance from these clubs led Harvey to announce his resignation from the position of chief executive in 2019.

=== Wrexham (2021–present) ===
Harvey joined Wrexham in February 2021 as an advisor to the Board after American actor Rob McElhenney and Canadian-American actor Ryan Reynolds announced their intention to buy the club. At the time of the purchase, Wrexham played in the National League, the fifth tier of English football, below the Premier League and the three tiers of the English Football League system. On 22 April 2023, Wrexham secured promotion from the National League to EFL League Two, the fourth tier of English football, after a 3–1 league win over Boreham Wood. In December 2023, Wrexham announced that Harvey had been appointed as a director. The club was promoted to the EFL League One the following summer.

On the 26th April 2025, Wrexham were promoted for the third consecutive season and will play in the EFL Championship the following season.
