= Halifax F.C. =

Halifax
- Full name: Halifax Football Club

Halifax F.C. was an English football club based in Halifax, West Yorkshire.

== History ==
The club was a founder member of the first incarnation of the Yorkshire Football League in 1897, but finished third bottom and resigned from the competition after just one year.

The team was a part of the bigger Halifax Cricket and Football Club, who were beset by financial problems for many years before finally being wound up in the 1900s.
