= Firth Vickers F.C. =

Firth Vickers
- Full name: Firth Vickers Football Club
- Ground: Bawtry Road, Tinsley

Firth Vickers F.C. was an English football club located in Sheffield, South Yorkshire.

== History ==
The club played in the Sheffield Amateur League and Sheffield Association League during the 1950s and 1960s before joining the Yorkshire League in 1969. They were relegated from Division Two at the end of their first season, and after finishing second bottom of Division Three in 1971 they returned to the Association League.

== Honours ==
- Sheffield Association League Division 2
  - Promoted: 1963–64

== Records ==
- Best FA Amateur Cup performance: 1st Qualifying Round 1968–69, 1970–71
