= Sheffield University F.C. =

Association football club in England

Sheffield University
- Full name: Sheffield University Football Club
- League: BUSA Football League

Sheffield University F.C. is an English association football club based in Sheffield, South Yorkshire. This football club is amongst the largest sporting clubs at the University of Sheffield.

== History ==
=== League and cup history ===
Sheffield University League and Cup history
Season	Division	Position	FA Amateur Cup	FA Vase
1914–15			2nd Qualifying Round	-
1925–26			1st Qualifying Round	-
1929–30			3rd Qualifying Round	-
1932–33	Yorkshire League	10th/10	-	-
1933–34	Yorkshire League	12th/13	-	-
1934–35	Yorkshire League	18th/18	-	-
1935–36	Yorkshire League	20th/20	-	-
1968–69			Preliminary Round	-
1970–71			Preliminary Round	-
1971–72			Preliminary Round	-
1972–73			2nd Qualifying Round	-
1973–74			1st Qualifying Round	-
1974–75			-	1st Round
1975–76			-	1st Round
1976–77			-	1st Round
1977–78			-	Preliminary Round

== Records ==
- Best FA Amateur Cup performance - 3rd Qualifying Round, 1929–30
- Best FA Vase performance - 1st Round, 1974–75, 1975–76, 1976–77
