= Maxine Hughes =

Welsh journalist

Maxine Hughes (born October 1979) is a Welsh journalist and television presenter who lives and works in Washington, D.C..

Hughes is from Conwy in North Wales and is S4C's US correspondent. In 2025, Hughes was appointed the Wales and the World President for the National Eisteddfod of Wales for the year.

As a teenager, Hughes competed in judo and acrobatics for Wales, and first went to the United States on a university football scholarship, at the age of 17. She later returned to the UK, where she worked for the BBC on the programme Doctor Who Confidential. She went on to work as a journalist with the BBC in London. She also worked as a news editor for Turkey's TRT World channel, and was in Istanbul at the time of the attempted coup in 2016. She reported on the murder of George Floyd for BBC Radio Cymru in a special programme called Ddim yn Ddu a Gwyn ("Not black and white"). Since 2024 she has presented occasional documentaries for S4C under the title Byd Eithafol

In 2021, she was chosen as Welsh translator for Ryan Reynolds and Rob McElhenney, when they became owners of Wrexham A.F.C.. In 2025, she was admitted to the Gorsedd at the National Eisteddfod.
