= Slazengers F.C. =

Former football club in Horbury, England

Slazengers
- Full name: Slazengers Football Club

Slazengers F.C. was an English football club based in Horbury, West Yorkshire.

== History ==
The club played in the Yorkshire Football League Division 3 in 1964.
