= Hamptons Sports F.C. =

Hamptons Sports
- Full name: Hamptons Sports Football Club

Hamptons Sports F.C. was an English association football club based in South Yorkshire. They competed in the Yorkshire Football League and FA Amateur Cup.

== History ==
=== League and cup history ===
Hamptons Sports League and Cup history
Season	Division	Position	FA Amateur Cup
1952–53	Yorkshire League Division 2	13th/14	Preliminary Round
1953–54	Yorkshire League Division 2	10th/16	Preliminary Round
1954–55	Yorkshire League Division 2	7th/16	1st Qualifying Round
1955–56	Yorkshire League Division 2	11th/16	Preliminary Round
1956–57	Yorkshire League Division 2	9th/17	1st Qualifying Round
1957–58	Yorkshire League Division 2	12th/14	Extra Preliminary Round
1958–59	Yorkshire League Division 2	10th/13	Preliminary Round
1959–60	Yorkshire League Division 2	7th/15	2nd Qualifying Round
1960–61	Yorkshire League Division 2	11th/19	-
1966–67	Yorkshire League Division 2	8th/17	-
1967–68	Yorkshire League Division 2	2nd/17	-
1968–69	Yorkshire League Division 1	18th/18	-
1969–70	Yorkshire League Division 2	13th/18	-
