= Heeley Amateurs F.C. =

Heeley Amateurs
- Full name: Heeley Amateurs Football Club

Heeley Amateurs F.C. was an English association football club based in South Yorkshire. They competed in the Yorkshire Football League and FA Amateur Cup

== History ==
=== League and cup history ===
Heeley Amateurs League and Cup history
Season	Division	Position	FA Amateur Cup
1965–66	Yorkshire League Division 2	7th/15	-
1966–67	Yorkshire League Division 2	15th/17	1st Qualifying Round
1967–68	Yorkshire League Division 2	5th/17	Preliminary Round
1968–69	Yorkshire League Division 2	2nd/17	-
1969–70	Yorkshire League Division 1	18th/18	-
1970–71	Yorkshire League Division 2	11th/14	-
1971–72	Yorkshire League Division 2	14th/15	-
1972–73	Yorkshire League Division 3	15th/15	Preliminary Round
1973–74	Yorkshire League Division 3	5th/16	-
1974–75	Yorkshire League Division 3	10th/16	-
1975–76	Yorkshire League Division 3	13th/16	-
1976–77	Yorkshire League Division 3	15th/16	-
