= Doncaster United F.C. =

English football club

Doncaster United
- Full name: Doncaster United Football Club
- Founded: 1959
- Dissolved: 1969

Doncaster United F.C. was an English association football club based in Doncaster, South Yorkshire.

== History ==
=== League and cup history ===
Doncaster United League and Cup history
Season	Division	Position	FA Amateur Cup
1959–60	Yorkshire League Division 2	4th/15	1st Round
1960–61	Yorkshire League Division 1	16th/18	1st Qualifying Round
1961–62	Yorkshire League Division 2	2nd/14	2nd Qualifying Round
1962–63	Yorkshire League Division 1	11th/16	4th Qualifying Round
1963–64	Yorkshire League Division 1	16th/16	1st Qualifying Round
1964–65	Yorkshire League Division 2	9th/15	Preliminary Round
1965–66	Yorkshire League Division 2	12th/15	Preliminary Round
1966–67	Yorkshire League Division 2	6th/17	1st Qualifying Round
1967–68	Yorkshire League Division 2	13th/17	2nd Qualifying Round
1968–69	Yorkshire League Division 2	15th/17	1st Qualifying Round

== Records ==
- Best FA Amateur Cup performance:
