= Swallownest Miners Welfare F.C. =

Swallownest Miners Welfare
- Full name: Swallownest Miners Welfare Football Club

Swallownest Miners Welfare F.C. was an English football club located in Swallownest, Sheffield, South Yorkshire.

== History ==
The club competed in the Yorkshire Football League in the 1960s, competing in Division 1 on three occasions. They also played in the FA Amateur Cup and the FA Vase.

=== League and cup history ===
Swallownest Miners Welfare League and Cup history
Season	Division	Position	FA Amateur Cup	FA Vase
1959–60			Preliminary Round	-
1960–61	Yorkshire League Division 2	14th/19	Preliminary Round	-
1961–62	Yorkshire League Division 2	3rd/14	4th Qualifying Round	-
1962–63	Yorkshire League Division 1	8th/16	1sth Qualifying Round	-
1963–64	Yorkshire League Division 1	13th/16	1st Qualifying Round	-
1964–65	Yorkshire League Division 2	10th/15	Preliminary Round	-
1965–66	Yorkshire League Division 2	10th/15	1st Qualifying Round	-
1966–67	Yorkshire League Division 2	16th/17	2nd Qualifying Round	-
1967–68	Yorkshire League Division 2	12th/17	1st Qualifying Round	-
1968–69	Yorkshire League Division 2	3rd/17	3rd Qualifying Round	-
1969–70	Yorkshire League Division 1	14th/18		-
1970–71	Yorkshire League Division 2	14th/14	2nd Qualifying Round	-
1971–72			2nd Qualifying Round	-
1972–73			Preliminary Round	-
1973–74			1st Qualifying Round	-
1974–75			-	1st Round
1975–76			-	Preliminary Round

== Honours ==
=== League ===
- Yorkshire League Division 2
  - Promoted: 1961–62, 1968–69

=== Cup ===
None

== Records ==
- Best League performance: 8th, Yorkshire League Division 1, 1962–63
- Best FA Amateur Cup performance: 4th Qualifying Round, 1961–62
- Best FA Vase performance: 1st Round, 1974–75
