= Spital F.C. =

Defunct English football club

- Full name: Spital Football Club
- Nicknames: the Spitalites, the Limerick Twister
- Founded: 1874
- Dissolved: 1887
- Ground: Factory Ground
- Secretary: Charles L. Mason
Home colours

Spital Football Club was an association football club from Chesterfield, Derbyshire, active in the 19th century.

== History ==
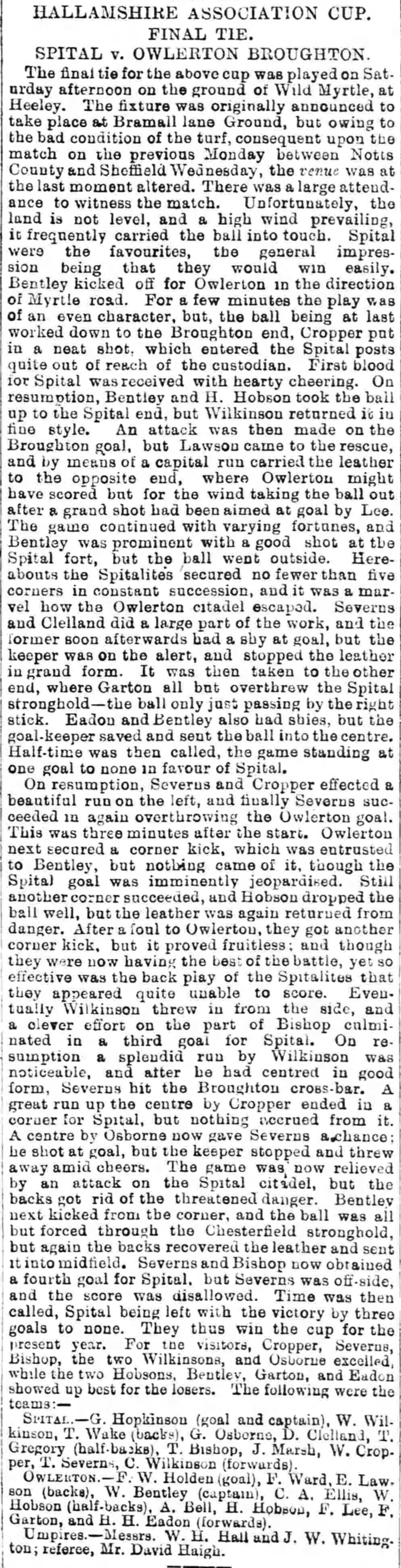
1882–83 Hallamshire Cup Final, Spital 3–0 Owlerton Broughtoun, Sheffield Independent, 19 February 1883

The club was founded as Spital United F.C in 1874, its first reported match being against Gleadless F.C. in March 1875; at the time, the club played under the Sheffield rules. The club was founded by employees of the Geo. Mason & Sons twist tobacco manufactory, and the club's secretary from 1879 to its dissolution was Charles Leonard Mason, grandson of the company founder.

The club shortened its name to Spital from the start of 1877, and, with the rest of the Sheffield Association, took up the association code after the Sheffield and Football Associations merged. Its first achievement of any note was reaching the quarter-final of the Sheffield Senior Cup in 1878–79; in the first round, the club beat Derbyshire F.C., and survived a protest that four of its players were not proper club members, but Nottinghamshire men. Notably, the club did not field any of them in its quarter-final tie against the eventual winner Thursday Wanderers, as three of them - Sam Widdowson, Arthur Goodyer, and Albert Smith - were playing for Nottingham Forest on the same day in an FA Cup tie with the Old Harrovians. The Sheffield Cup tie took place at the Chesterfield Recreation Ground; Spital took the lead, but ran out of steam, and lost 5–3. It seemingly reached the last 5 stage the following season, beating Providence away from home in a third round replay, but the club was disqualified for fielding an ineligible player, C. Wilkinson, whom Chesterfield Town protested was not a bona fide member of the club, despite the Cup committee having allegedly cleared his participation.

The club's geographical location meant it could take part in the Sheffield, Derbyshire, and Birmingham Senior Cups, as well as the prestigious Hallamshire Senior Cup. Its biggest competitive win came in the 1880–81 Birmingham Senior Cup second round, when it beat Calthorpe 10–0 in a home replay - the visitors were only able to bring a weak side. The club's run that season was its best in its history, bowing out of the competition at the final six stage thanks to a 2–0 against West Bromwich Albion in filthy weather at the Aston Lower Grounds. Its greatest honour was winning the Hallamshire competition in 1882–83, beating Owlerton Broughton 3–0 in the final.

=== FA Cup ===
As a member of the Football Association, the club was also entitled to enter the FA Cup, and did so for the first time in 1882–83, being drawn at home to Wednesbury Old Athletic in the first round. The half-time score was 1–1, Bishop scoring an equalizer for the homesters just before the break, but W.O.A.C. had played the first half facing into the wind, and, with the wind behind its players in the second half, rattled in 6 goals without reply. Its 1883–84 FA Cup run also ended in the first round, this time after a replay, a 1–1 draw with Rotherham Town followed by a 7–2 away defeat, "much to the surprise of the Spital partisans".

The club played in the second round for the only time in the 1884–85 FA Cup, but only after a first round bye, and it lost heavily again on its first appearance, this time 4–0 at the Sheffield club, played at Attercliffe's ground. Perhaps chastened by these failures, Spital did not enter the competition again.

=== End of the club ===
Spital tried to take a major step forward in 1886, by poaching a number of players from the more successful Staveley side, most notably goalkeeper Joe Marshall, which led Staveley to complain about illegal inducements. The move was however futile, as the club fell apart by the end of the 1886–87 season, with only 7 players turning up for a match with Derby Junction in February 1887. Before the new season, Marshall took up a new job in Derby, which saw him transfer his football allegiance to Derby County.

Spital's place in the town was taken by the short-lived Spital Olympic club, despite an attempt to revive the original club "like a phoenix from the ashes". Such was the confusion that the last competitive appearance of the Spital name - in the 1887–88 Derbyshire Senior Cup - was credited both to Spital and Spital Olympic; in the end it mattered not which club it was, as it scratched to Staveley in the first round. The last reported game for Spital Olympic was a 5–0 defeat at Derby Midland in December 1887, and the last contemporary mention of "the late Spital F.C." was of a representative attending the funeral of Staveley footballer William Cropper in January 1889, alongside representatives of Staveley and Chesterfield Town.

== Colours ==
The club originally wore royal blue jerseys with a red hoop. It soon changed to blue and black halves, and in November 1884 to a Union Jack-bodied shirt with blue sleeves, the gift of Charles and O. E. Mason. This design was later used by Chesterfield Town, possibly using the same shirts, as Spital had left the shirts at the Eagle Hotel on the club's dissolution; the hotel had been the club's headquarters in its final years.

== Ground ==
The club's ground was at Spital Vale, one and a half miles from Chesterfield railway station. It was in front of the Geo. Mason factory and known as the Factory Ground. It occasionally played Cup ties (such as the 1883 FA Cup tie with Rotherham Town) at the Chesterfield Recreation Ground.

== Nickname ==
The club's nickname of the Limerick Twisters derived from the factory shipping in tobacco from the Irish town of Limerick, and the practice of "twisting" tobacco carried out within the factory.

== Notable players ==
- T. Bishop represented the Sheffield Football Association as a right-winger in the "mini-international" against the Lancashire Football Association at Accrington in 1880, the Sheffield side winning by a surprisingly easy 7–1, Bishop scoring the third and seventh goals.
- Joe Marshall, goalkeeper, who played for the club in its final full season before moving to Derby
- Sam Widdowson, Arthur Goodyer, and Albert Smith, who played for the club in the 1870s, while also members of Nottingham Forest
- Jimmy Lang twice guested for the club in December 1876, scoring in a 3–0 win over Clay Cross and a 1–0 win over Staveley.
