= Jimmy Lang =

Scottish footballer

Personal information
- Full name: James Joseph Lang
- Date of birth: March 1851
- Place of birth: Scotland
- Date of death: 14 July 1929 (aged 78)
- Place of death: Glasgow, Scotland
- Position: Forward

Senior career*
| Years | Team | Apps | (Gls) |
- Eastern
- Clydesdale
- Third Lanark
| 1876–188? | The Wednesday | | |
| 1876 | Spital | | |
| 1877–1879 | Third Lanark | | |
| 1879 | Attercliffe | | |
| 1879–1880 | Sheffield Zulus | | |
| 1884 | Northwich Victoria | | |

International career
| 1876–1878 | Scotland | 2 | (2) |

Managerial career
- Sheffield Zulus
- * Club domestic league appearances and goals

James Joseph Lang (March 1851 – 14 July 1929) was a Scottish international footballer who represented Scotland twice from 1876 to 1878.

== Early life ==
Lang was born in March 1851 in Scotland. Before his football career, he worked at the John Brown & Company's shipyard on the River Clyde in Glasgow, where he lost sight in one eye due to an accident in 1869.

== Football career ==
=== Club career ===
Lang's playing career started with Glasgow's Eastern, from where he moved to Clydesdale and then Third Lanark. While with Clydesdale he played in the first ever Scottish Cup final in 1874, losing 2–0 against Queen's Park. He also became involved with the Glasgow vs. Sheffield association matches, and at the 1876 meeting (in which Glasgow won 2–0) he caught the attention of The Wednesday board. They subsequently invited him to play for their team. He was not paid by the club but instead gained employment with a company in Garden Street owned by one of the directors, Walter Fearnehough. Although the family business manufactured "Bayonet Spirals, Ledger Blades and Chaff Knives" Lang received no formal duties and he spent most of the day reading the paper. The first mention of Lang playing for Wednesday was a friendly against local rivals Hallam on 25 November 1876. While he appeared for Wednesday throughout the 1876–77 season, featuring in "six friendly matches, four cup ties, two representative fixtures and one benefit game", he also made two appearances for Chesterfield Spital during December 1876.

Lang returned to Third Lanark in October 1877 and played in their 1878 Scottish Cup Final defeat to Vale of Leven. Despite returning north of the border, Lang still featured for The Wednesday in 1878, playing in three Sheffield Challenge Cup matches, including the final in which Wednesday beat Attercliffe 2–0. While still at Third Lanark, Lang played once more for Wednesday in January 1879 against Heeley, before returning full-time to South Yorkshire for the 1879–80 season. Lang featured for Attercliffe against Blackburn Rovers in November 1879. Lang also played for the Sheffield Zulus, lining up for them against Chesterfield on 24 November 1879 and Barnsley in January 1880 – he was also briefly secretary for the club. Lang featured for Wednesday over 20 times during the 1880–81 season, captaining them in the opening months. However, for the 1881–82 season he only appeared three times – including the 1882 Wharncliffe Charity Cup Final against Heeley, which Wednesday won 5–0.

Lang was also noted playing for Northwich Victoria against Bolton Wanderers in January 1884.

=== International career ===
He won two international caps for Scotland, the first on 25 March 1876 in a 4–0 win over Wales (the first international between the two countries) and the second on 23 March 1878, scoring a goal in each game.

== Career statistics ==
=== International ===
Appearances and goals by national team and year
| National team | Year | Apps | Goals |
|---|---|---|---|
| Scotland | 1876 | 1 | 1 |
| Scotland | 1878 | 1 | 1 |
| Scotland | Total | 2 | 2 |

=== International goals ===
International goals by date, venue, cap, opponent, score, result and competition
| No. | Date | Venue | Cap | Opponent | Score | Result | Competition | Ref. |
|---|---|---|---|---|---|---|---|---|
| 1 | 25 March 1876 | Hamilton Crescent, Glasgow, Scotland | 1 | Wales | 3–0 | 4–0 | Friendly | |
| 2 | 23 March 1878 | Hampden Park, Glasgow, Scotland | 2 | Wales | 9–0 | 9–0 | Friendly | |
