= Alexander Wallace =

Alexander Wallace may refer to:

- Alec Wallace (1872-1950), English footballer
- Alec Wallace (Australian footballer) (1881-1954)
- Alexander Wallace (footballer) (1874–1899), English footballer
- Alexander Wallace (priest) (1891–1982)
- Alexander Doniphan Wallace (1905–1985), mathematician
- Alexander Burns Wallace (1906–1974), Scottish plastic surgeon
- Alexander S. Wallace (1810–1893), members of House of Representatives from South Carolina
- Alexander Wallace (botanist) (1829–1899)

== See also ==
- Alexandra "Alex" Wallace
- Alexander Wallis, American football player
