= Pyebank F.C. =

Pyebank F.C. may refer to:

- Pyebank F.C. (1872), an association football club which originally played under the Sheffield rules and which later changed its name to Pitsmoor F.C.;
- Pyebank F.C. (1888), an association football club which started out as Pyebank Rovers before changing its name to Pyebank Reds and then Pyebank.
