= 1890 FA Cup final =

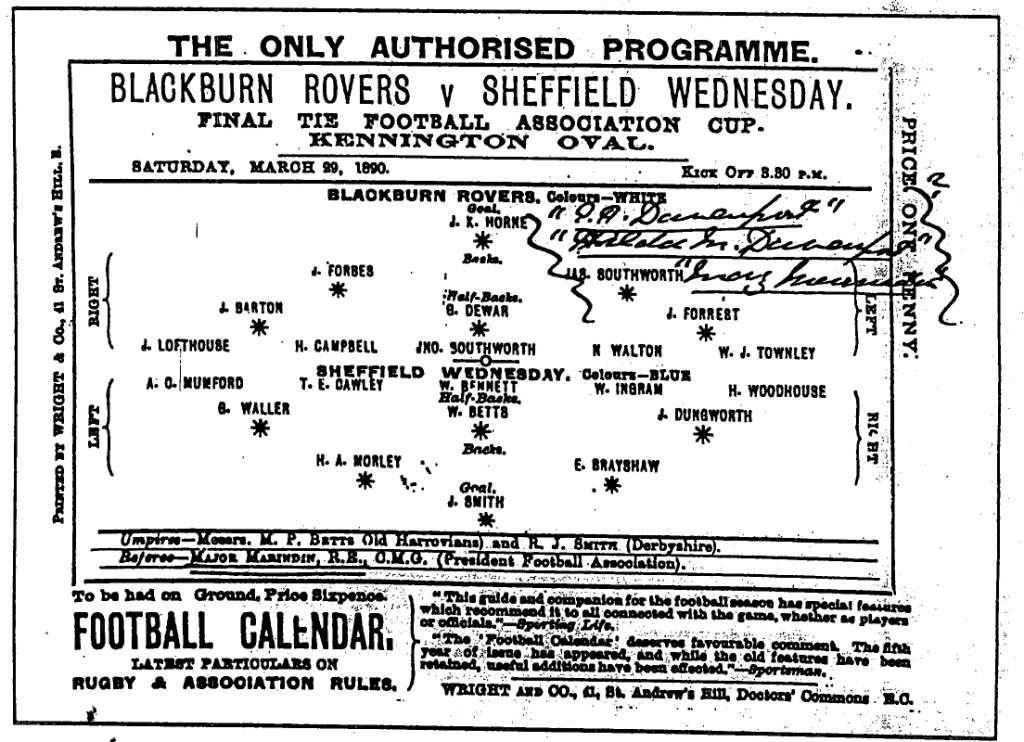
- The official match programme
- Event: 1889–90 FA Cup
Blackburn Rovers	The Wednesday
6	1
- Date: 29 March 1890
- Venue: Kennington Oval, London
- Referee: Major Francis Marindin
- Attendance: 20,000

The 1890 FA Cup final was contested by Blackburn Rovers and The Wednesday at the Kennington Oval.

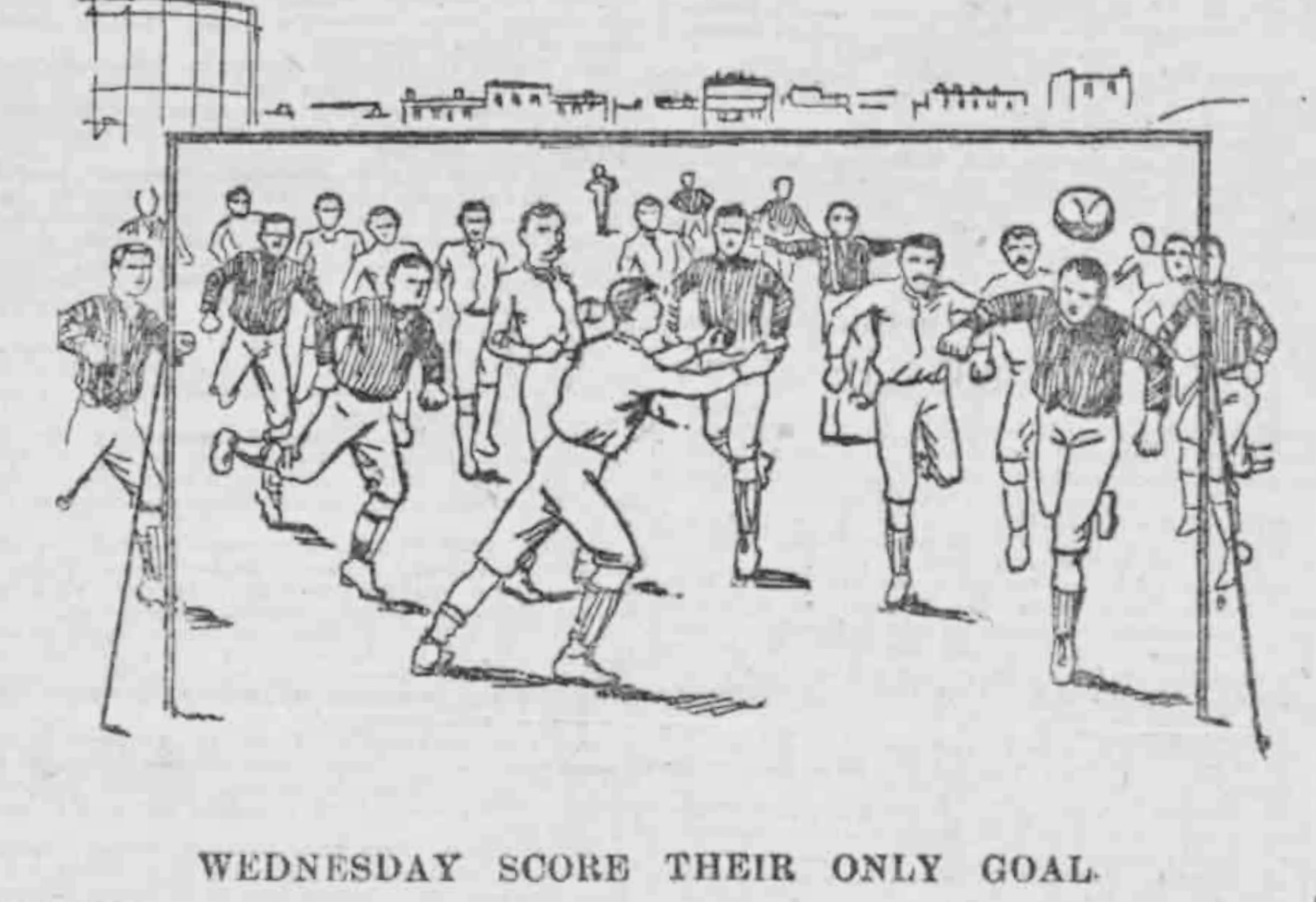
Sheffield Daily Telegraph illustration of Wednesday's goal (credited here to Micky Bennett; other sources give it to Albert Mumford.)

== Report ==
Blackburn won 6–1 with goals scored by William Townley (3), Nat Walton, Jack Southworth and Joe Lofthouse. The Wednesday's goal was scored by Albert Mumford. Townley's hat-trick was the first in an FA Cup Final. The match was the 19th FA Cup Final and the fourth time that Blackburn had won the FA Cup.

Wednesday had been handicapped by captain Henry Winterbottom being injured in the previous game against Grimsby Town and unable to play, replaced by Woolhouse of Sheffield F.C., and Billy Ingram was suffering from an illness which made it touch and go whether he would play; in the end, he did play, but was entirely ineffective. Smith was blamed for the first goal, after just six minutes, a Townley header from a Forrest free-kick which Smith "never appear[ed] to make any attempt to stop"; and also the second, a Walton long shot which Smith "entirely misjudged". In between Bennett missed a golden chance to equalise by heading an easy chance over the bar; Bennett also had a goal disallowed on the basis it had already gone out of play. Townley made it three after 38 minutes with a "magnificent shot" and Southworth made it 4 just before half-time.

Wednesday's consolation after 53 minutes was credited to both Mumford and Bennett, but either way was a header from a Woolhouse cross, but soon after Townley completed his hat-trick after Smith parried a shot from Lofthouse, and Lofthouse himself made it six with a handful of minutes remaining after a Forrest corner found him unmarked.

Haydn Arthur Morley, who was Wednesday's captain in the final, earned his living as a solicitor. The match was the last of seven consecutive and eight total finals officiated by Major Francis Marindin of the Royal Engineers, a veteran of the Crimean War. The match set the record for the highest scoring FA Cup Final, later equalled by the 1953 final. Blackburn's six goals remain the record for the most by one team in an FA Cup final, equalled by Bury in 1903 and by Manchester City in 2019.

== Match ==
29 March 1890

Blackburn Rovers	6–1	The Wednesday
Townley 6', 38', 70'; Walton 26'; Southworth 44'; Lofthouse 85'		Mumford 53'

Kennington Oval
Attendance: 20,000
Referee: Major Francis Marindin

Blackburn Rovers	The Wednesday

GK	(England) Johnny Horne
DF	(England) James Southworth
DF	(Scotland) John Forbes
MF	(England) John Barton
MF	(Scotland) Geordie Dewar
MF	(England) Jimmy Forrest
FW	(England) Joe Lofthouse
FW	(Scotland) Harry Campbell
FW	(England) Jack Southworth
FW	(England) Nat Walton
FW	(England) William Townley

GK	(England) Jim Smith
DF	(England) Haydn Morley (c)
DF	(England) Teddy Brayshaw
MF	(England) Jack Dungworth
MF	(England) Billy Betts
MF	(England) George Waller
FW	(England) Billy Ingram
FW	(England) Harry Woolhouse
FW	(England) Micky Bennett
FW	(England) Albert Mumford
FW	(England) Tom Cawley
