= Mexborough Athletic F.C. =

Mexborough Athletic
- Full name: Mexborough Athletic Football Club
- Founded: 1903; 122 years ago (as Mexborough Town)
- Dissolved: 1936
- Ground: Athletic Ground
Home colours

Mexborough Athletic F.C. was an English association football club based in Mexborough, Doncaster, South Yorkshire.

== History ==
The club was formed as Mexborough Town in 1903, and was the second team to take the Mexborough name, the first having been wound up three years earlier.

They spent their first season in the Sheffield Association League, winning the league title at the first attempt. The club joined the Midland League in 1905 and would remain in the competition for the rest of their existence.

The Midland League was suspended for the duration of the First World War, but Mexborough rejoined the competition when hostilities ended. The club won its only Midland League title in 1926, two years after changing their name to Mexborough Athletic. The following year they reached the first round of the FA Cup, losing to Chesterfield at Saltergate.

Athletic would struggle on in the lower echelons of the Midland League until 1936, when after finishing bottom of the table, they resigned from the competition and disbanded.

=== League and cup history ===
Mexborough League and Cup history
Season	Division	Position	FA Cup
1903–04	Sheffield Association League	1st/14	3rd qualifying round
1904–05	Wharncliffe Charity Cup League		5th qualifying round
1905–06	Midland League	5th/18	2nd qualifying round
1906–07	Midland League	6th/20	-
1907–08	Midland League	17th/20	1st qualifying round
1908–09	Midland League	12th/20	4th qualifying round
1909–10	Midland League	20th/22	5th qualifying round
1910–11	Midland League	10th/20	2nd qualifying round
1911–12	Midland League	9th/19	3rd qualifying round
1912–13	Midland League	19th/20	Preliminary round
1913–14	Midland League	17th/18	Preliminary round
1914–15	Midland League	17th/20	1st qualifying round
1919–20	Midland League	5th/18	2nd qualifying round
1920–21	Midland League	17th/20	2nd qualifying round
1921–22	Midland League	6th/22	Preliminary round
1922–23	Midland League	18th/22	2nd qualifying round
1923–24	Midland League	4th/22	2nd qualifying round
1924–25	Midland League	8th/15	Preliminary round
1925–26	Midland League	1st/21	2nd qualifying round
1926–27	Midland League	5th/20	1st round
1927–28	Midland League	17th/23	Preliminary round
1928–29	Midland League	20th/26	3rd qualifying round
1929–30	Midland League	20th/26	3rd qualifying round
1930–31	Midland League	20th/24	2nd qualifying round
1931–32	Midland League	16th/24	1st qualifying round
1932–33	Midland League	21st/23	Preliminary round
1933–34	Midland League	16th/17	Preliminary round
1934–35	Midland League	15th/20	Preliminary round
1935–36	Midland League	21st/21	1st qualifying round

== Colours ==
The club's colours were red (or scarlet) and blue, in stripes, with white shorts.

== Honours ==
=== League ===
- Midland League
  - Champions: 1925–26
- Sheffield Association League
  - Champions: 1903–04

=== Cup ===
- Sheffield & Hallamshire Senior Cup
  - Winners: 1930–31, 1933–34
  - Runners-up: 1910–11, 1922–23

== Records ==
- Best FA Cup performance: 1st round, 1927–28
