= Clinton F.C. =

English football club

- Full name: Clinton Football Club
- Nickname: the Clintonites
- Founded: 1883
- Dissolved: 1891
- Ground: Grimesthorpe Road
- Secretary: John Bardill (1883–90), A. Prior (1890–91)
Home colours

Clinton Football Club was an association football club from Sheffield, Yorkshire, active in the late 19th century.

== History ==
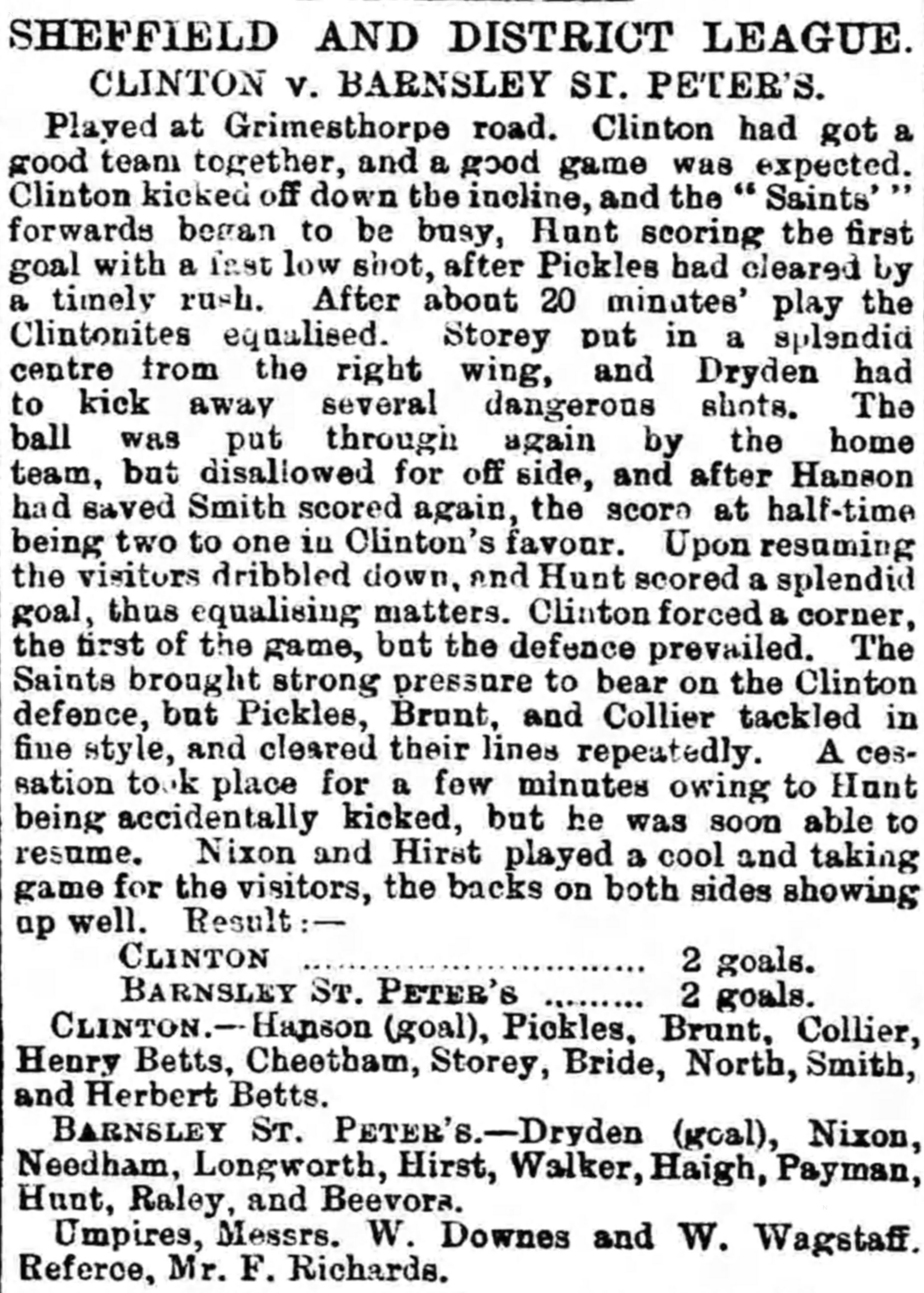
Clinton FC's last reported match, 2–2 v Barnsley (then known as Barnsley St Peter's), Sheffield League, from the Sheffield Independent, 23 February 1891

The club was founded in 1883 and was entirely made up of ironworkers. One of its first matches was a special demonstration match, against Sheffield Wanderers, in Paddock, Huddersfield, in a premature attempt to convert the rugby football town to the association code. Its first achievement of note was reaching the final of the Hallamshire Cup, a competition for younger clubs in the Sheffield area, in 1883–84, going down 4–3 to the Eckington Works side at Bramall Lane in a replay. Eckington was a thorn in the Clinton side in the competition; in 1884–85, the clubs played two semi-final replays before Eckington won through to the final (in recognition of which, the Clintonians were invited to the prize-giving ceremony at the end of the season, and presented with new shirts), and Clinton also lost to the Works in the competition's last final in 1886–87.

The club was one of the eight founder members of the Sheffield & District Football League in 1889, winning its first match, at home to Ecclesfield, 3–2, left-half Humberstone scoring the winner direct from a free-kick. The club started the season strongly, winning its first 7 matches, but an unexpected 3–0 defeat at Walkley in February 1890 started a run of bad form which saw the club only register 1 point in its last 7, including losing 6–2 twice to eventual champion Kilnhurst, and finish third in the table.

It entered the 1890–91 FA Cup qualifying rounds, but lost at the first hurdle, going down 7–3 at home to Jardines. The club however had suffered a blow at the start of the season when its long-standing secretary, John Bardill, had to stand down for business reasons, and much of the club's impetus was lost with him. Indeed, it was not able to complete the season; after failing to turn up to a match at Mexborough in March 1891, it resigned from the Sheffield League, and its results (2 wins, 2 draws, and 6 defeats, leaving the club bottom of the 9 team table) were expunged.

== Colours ==
The club wore red jerseys, which caused problems for the Cup tie with Jardines, as the visitors had turned up in their red jerseys as well, forcing Clinton's players to adopt a gallimaufry of "handkerchiefs and parti-coloured jerseys".

== Ground ==
The club played at two grounds over its history, both in Grimesthorpe Road; the second, to which the club moved in 1889, was the All Saints cricket field, and was nearer to the main road.

== Notable players ==
- Albert Mumford and Billy Ingram, who played for Clinton in the mid-1880s before joining Sheffield Wednesday.
