= Micky Bennett =

English footballer

Personal information
- Full name: William Bennett
- Date of birth: c. 1862
- Place of birth: Mexborough, England
- Date of death: 13 September 1919
- Position: Forward

Senior career*
Years	Team	Apps	(Gls)
1885–87	Mexbro'		
1887–88	Rotherham Town		
1888–89	Doncaster Rovers		
1889–92	The Wednesday		
1892-94	Mexbro'		
- * Club domestic league appearances and goals

William "Micky" Bennett was an association footballer who played in the 1890 FA Cup final for Sheffield Wednesday.

== Career ==
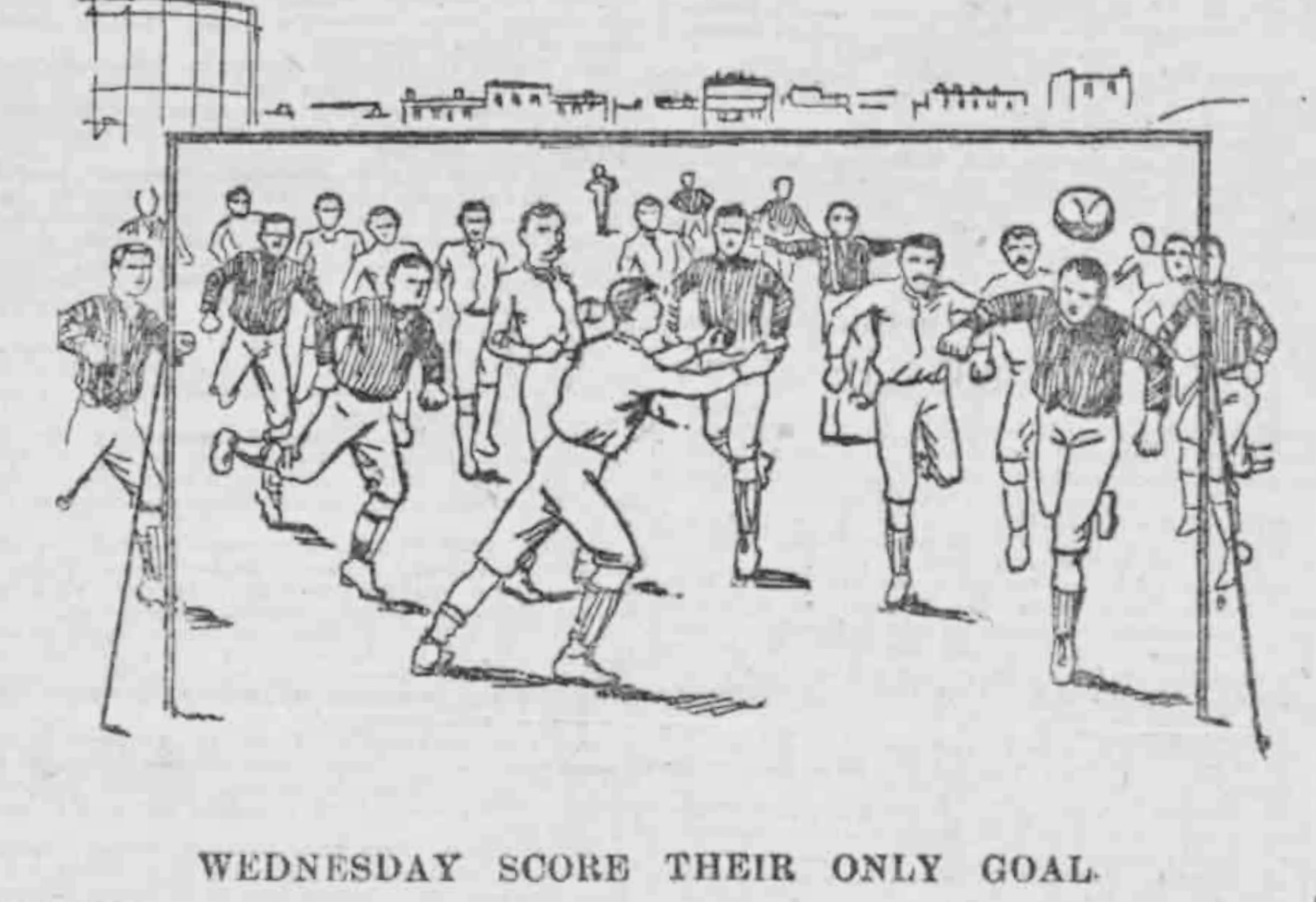
1890 FA Cup final, Micky Bennett's goal for Sheffield Wednesday, a consolation in a 6–1 defeat. Sheffield Daily Telegraph, 31 March 1890

He played as centre-forward for Rotherham Town, Mexborough, and Doncaster Rovers, He was particularly noted for his heading ability, and was said to "know no fear". He won the Sheffield Senior Cup with Mexborough in 1885–86, heading the equalizer in a 2–1 win over Heeley in the final, at the Old Forge Ground.

In the summer of 1889, he signed Sheffield Wednesday, amid controversy, as he had apparently signed contracts for both Wednesday and Rotherham Town; he was suspended by the Football Association while the issue was sorted out - Bennett's defence was that he was unable to write so could not have signed for Town. The Association eventually ruled that Bennett could start playing for Wednesday after 1 November 1889. Nevertheless, Town sued Bennett for £5 in damages, Bennett's mother being thrown out of court for interrupting Town's testimony; Town was eventually awarded £5 10/9, to cover the travel costs for a substitute for a match in which Bennett had been selected.

Bennett was not a regular for Wednesday, and had to be brought into the XI for the FA Cup final at the end of his first season, in order to replace an injured Winterbottom; Wednesday duly went down 6–1 to Blackburn Rovers. Bennett did head home a cross in the first half but the goal was ruled out on the basis that the ball had already crossed the goal-line; he did eventually score from another header in the 53rd minute, but by this time Wednesday was already 4–0 down.

His career at Wednesday did not last long, and he finished his career with a couple of seasons back at Mexborough.

== Personal life ==
Bennett's younger brothers Walter and 'Tip' were also professional footballers, the former for Sheffield United amongst others and the latter for Barnsley. He married Annie in 1879 and the couple had two sons and a daughter.

Bennett volunteered for duty in the First World War in 1915, despite being 53 years old, joining the King's Own Yorkshire Light Infantry until rheumatism invalided him out a few months later. He died at his home in Mexborough on 13 September 1919.
