= Pyebank F.C. (1872) =

Former association football club

Pye Bank Football Club
- Full name: Pye Bank
- Nickname(s): Pyebankers
- Founded: 1872
- Dissolved: 1888
- Ground: Fox Street
- Match Secretary: T. E. Masden & W. J. Worrall
- Captain: Henry Fletcher (1881)
Home colours

Pye Bank, or Pyebank, Football Club was an association football club from Sheffield, which originally played under the Sheffield rules.

== History ==
The club was founded in 1872. Initially it was too small to join the Sheffield Football Association, but was a founder member of the Sheffield New Football Association in 1877, and the first winner of the New Association's Challenge Cup; in the semi-final, at the fifth time of asking, the Pyebankers gained 1–0 win over Rising Star, future club secretary Worrall notching the only goal, a shot from the right wing as the ball emerged from a scrimmage, shortly before the break. The final proved a far easier task, beating Owlerton Broughton 5–0, the "cleverness of several Pyebankers" being too much for the more muscular "heavy lunges" of its opponent.

Following that success, the club did join the Sheffield Association, and its greatest achievement was reaching the final of the Sheffield Challenge Cup in 1881–82, but it lost 5–0 to Heeley, the blame in part being put on the players' over-awe at appearing at Bramall Lane; the club's consolation was that it received a new set of jerseys to go with its medals. The downside was that one player, Billy Betts, had impressed Heeley so much that it persuaded Betts to join it, although he still turned out occasionally for the Pyebankers afterwards.

Pyebank also reached the final of the Wharncliffe Charity Cup in 1882–83 and 1883–84, losing 4–0 to The Wednesday and 6–0 to the Lockwood Brothers respectively.

The club's last known game under the Pye Bank name was in the Owlerton Challenge Cup final in 1886; the club took the trophy by beating Cavendish 3–1. The club changed its name to Pitsmoor in time for the 1886–87 season but it only appears to have played for two more years, its last recorded match being a defeat at home to Clinton in March 1888. The Pyebank name was later used for a club which had started out as Pyebank Rovers in 1888.

== Colours ==
The club's earliest recorded colour was navy blue. In 1881, the club changed to maroon jerseys, which were also described as "scarlet".

== Ground ==
The club's original ground was in New Grimesthorpe. In 1879 it moved to Fox Street, a 15-minute walk from Sheffield railway station. By 1885 it had a new ground in Pitsmoor.

== Notable players ==
- Billy Betts, who played for the club in 1881–82 and 1882–83, and later played for The Wednesday and England
- Frank Sugg, who played for the club in 1882–83 and 1883–84, and whose absence from the side in the Wharncliffe Cup final proved costly

Two other players (goalkeeper Cunningham and half-back Bowns) represented the Sheffield Football Association in the "mini-international" against the Lancashire Football Association in 1883.
