= Jim Smith (footballer, born 1863) =

English footballer

Personal information
- Full name: James Clarke
- Date of birth: 1863
- Date of death: 1937 (aged 73–74)
- Position: Goalkeeper

Senior career*
| Years | Team | Apps | (Gls) |
| 1883–93 | The Wednesday | | |
- * Club domestic league appearances and goals

Jim Smith was an association footballer who played in the 1890 FA Cup final for Sheffield Wednesday.

== Career ==
Smith, whose real surname was Clarke, started work at the Atlas & Norfolk Steel Works - originally operating in the crucible room - when he was 11 years old; he worked there for 58 years.

His playing career was entirely with Sheffield Wednesday, and was the first choice goalkeeper from 1884 to 1891. The highlight - and lowlight - of his career was appearing for the club in the 1889–90 FA Cup final. As a full-time employee and part-time footballer, Smith (along with Tom Cawley) was unable to take part in the special training for the latter stages of the competition, He proved a stellar choice in the 2–1 semi-final win over Bolton Wanderers with one particular save just before half-time being noted, and the goal against him having a suspicion of offside.

The final however was a different matter. Captain Henry Winterbottom could not play because of injury, and forward Billy Ingram was not at full fitness; opponents Blackburn Rovers took full advantage, going 4–0 up before half-time and winning 6–1, a record at the time. Smith was blamed for the first two goals. He did however have the consolation of a championship medal in the Football Alliance, of which Wednesday were the inaugural champions that season. Curiously, Wednesday finished bottom in 1890–91, but finished high enough in 1891–92 to be elected to the Football League; however by the end of the latter season Smith had been displaced from goal by Allen.

After retiring from the playing field, he acted as coach for the Atlas & Norfolk works sides.

He was a club cricketer for 30 years and an angler of some repute, winning the Sheffield works angling championship when he was 68. He was also a member of the Burngreave Conservative Association, acting as Father Christmas in the organization's charity Christmas parties, distributing toys to poor families. He died in 1937, survived by his widow, son, and daughter.

== Honours ==
- FA Cup
  - Runner-up: 1889–90
- Football Alliance
  - Champion: 1889–90
