= Owlerton F.C. =

Owlerton
- Full name: Owlerton Football Club
- Founded: 1873
- Dissolved: 1897
- Ground: Rawson's Meadow
1873–1880s colours	last colours

Owlerton Football Club was an English football club, founded in 1873. The club was based in the northwest Sheffield suburb of Owlerton.

== History ==
Owlerton was founded in 1873, probably as an offshoot of the Owlerton Cricket Club, and played under the Sheffield rules until the latter's congruence with Football Association laws. The first reference to the club in the media is a report of the club's annual elections in 1874, at which the club also resolved to join the Football Association along with its membership of the Sheffield Football Association. The club entered the 1876–77 Sheffield Challenge Cup, the first Sheffield FA competition, but it lost 2–1 at Hallam in the first round, Wood opening the scoring for Owlerton, but the team running out of steam after half-time, only having one second-half attack.

On Christmas Day in 1877, the club was playing a match at the St Philip's club, alongside Dark Lane, when a clearance sent the ball over a stone wall and into a quarry. James Beaumont of Owlerton jumped on top of the wall to retrieve the ball, but some of the stones on top were loose, and Beaumont fell sixty feet into the quarry to his death.

Although the club did not enter the FA Cup until 1887–88, it had an inadvertent impact on an earlier tournament. Mexborough F.C. was forced to scratch from the FA Cup in 1885–86 as the Sheffield FA ordered the club to play its Sheffield Senior Cup tie with Owlerton in preference to its replay with Staveley F.C.

The club's first FA Cup appearance was in the final year before qualifying rounds. In the first round, the club beat Eckington Works F.C. 2–1, gaining revenge for a defeat in the Hallamshire Cup the previous year. The club's run ended in the third round at Derby County in front of a disappointing crowd of 2,000.

The club entered the competition for the next three years, but, after reaching the fourth qualifying round in 1888–89, the club never won another tie; the rise of national leagues wiped out most of the senior clubs in Sheffield.

In 1892, the club amalgamated with the Montrose club, and changed its name to Owlerton and Montrose Football Club, playing at Owlerton. The club seems to have reverted to its former name at a later stage, and was still attracting crowds of 1,000 to its matches in 1896; it was advertising for players for the 1896–97 season, but does not seem to have lasted beyond that.

== Colours ==
The club's original colours were scarlet and black hoops. By 1887 it had changed to blue and white stripes.

== Ground ==
The club's ground was at Rawson's Meadow, two miles from Sheffield railway station, and it used the facilities of the Victoria Hotel. BY 1887 it was using the Crown Inn.

== Famous players ==
William Carr was the club's only England international player, earning one cap in 1875.
