= Hallamshire Cup =

- Founded: 1877
- Abolished: 1887
- Region: South Yorkshire
- Teams: various
- Related competitions: Sheffield & Hallamshire Senior Cup
- Most championships: Eckington Works, Intake, Staveley (2 titles)

The Hallamshire Cup was an association football competition, for clubs in and around Sheffield, England, in the 1870s and 1880s.

== History ==
The Sheffield New Football Association was established on 2 April 1877, made up of 14 clubs which had been prevented from joining the Sheffield Football Association on the ground that they were under 2 years old. The New Association promptly arranged for a cup competition for its members, to start in the 1877–78 season. The New Association Challenge Cup trophy was not ready until the second season of the competition; the design was shaped like a handled goblet, a footballer depicted on top of the lid with one foot resting on a football, and two players seated on the base of the pedestal.

The first winner of the competition was Pye Bank, who needed five games to beat fellow Sheffield side Rising Star in the semi-final. The Pyebankers hammered Owlerton Broughton 5–0 in the final the Sheaf Ground, at the time the home of Broomhall.

By 1881 the New Association covered a radius of 20 miles around Sheffield. In 1882, therefore, the association changed its name from the Sheffield New Association to the Hallamshire Association, and the New Association Cup was duly re-named the Hallamshire Cup.

The first winner of the newly-named competition was Spital; the final had to be played at the Black Bank ground in Heeley, home of the Wild Myrtle club, as Bramall Lane was hors de combat because of damage from a Notts County versus Sheffield Wednesday match.

The competition's final edition took place in the 1886–87 season, as the Hallamshire Association merged into the Sheffield at the close of the season. The trophy was used as the runner-up prize for the Sheffield Senior Cup, and later as the champion trophy for the Sheffield Association League.

== List of finals ==
Year	Winner	Score	Runner-up	Ground
1877–78	Pye Bank	5–0	Owlerton Broughton	Sheaf Ground
1878–79	Rising Star	4–1	Pitsmoor Christ Church	Sheaf Ground
1879–80	Burton Star	2–0	Rising Star	Bramall Lane
1880–81	Intake	1–0	Burton Star	Bramall Lane
1881–82	Intake	1–0	Dronfield Exchange	Bramall Lane
1882–83	Spital	3–0	Owlerton Broughton	Black Bank
1883–84	Eckington Works	4–3	Clinton	Bramall Lane
1884–85	Staveley	2–0	Eckington Works	Recreation Ground (Chesterfield)
1885–86	Staveley	3–2	Eckington Works	Bramall Lane
1886–87	Eckington Works	3–0	Clinton	Bramall Lane
