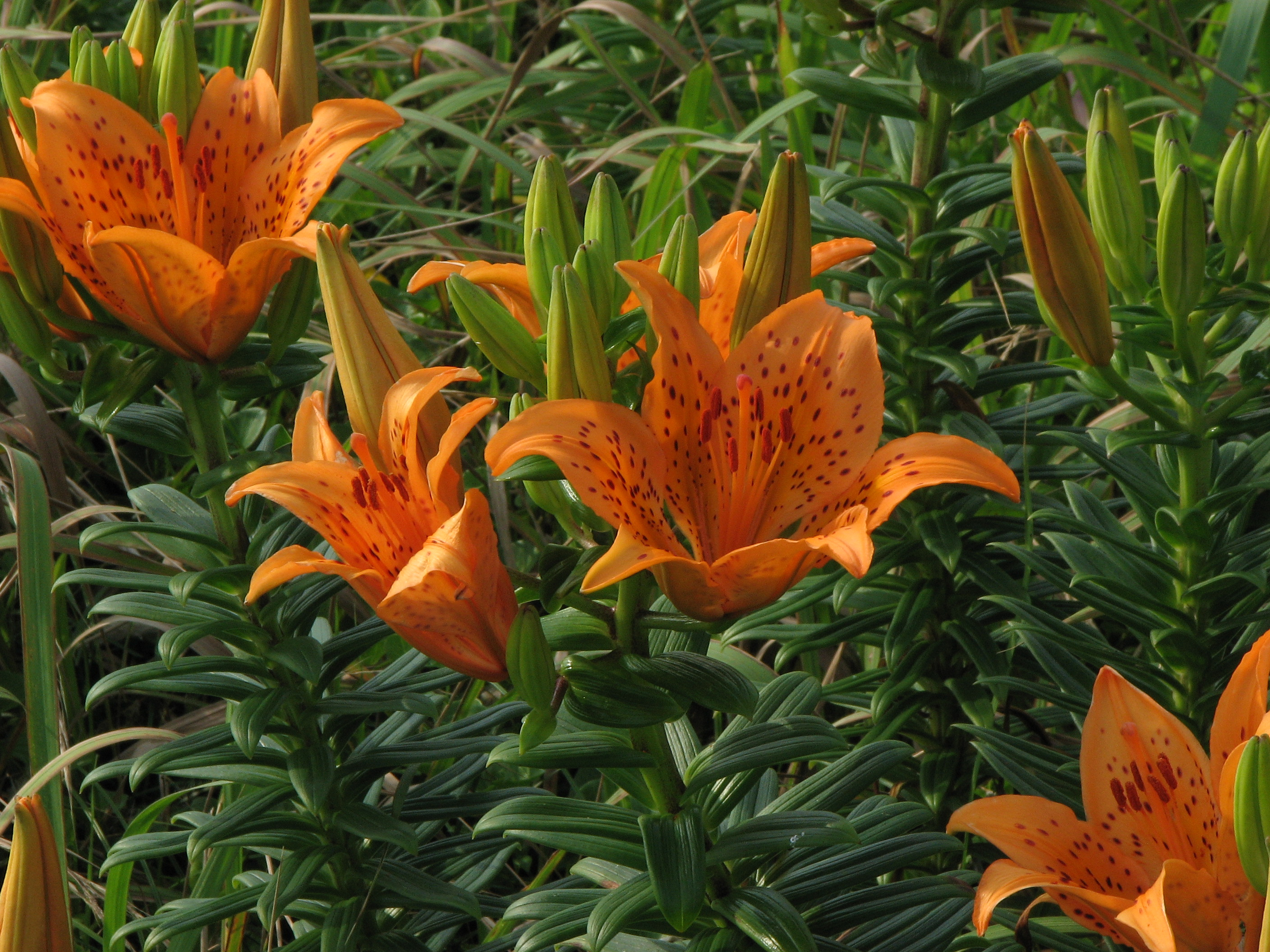

Scientific classification
- Kingdom: Plantae
- Clade: Embryophytes
- Clade: Tracheophytes
- Clade: Angiosperms
- Clade: Monocots
- Order: Liliales
- Family: Liliaceae
- Subfamily: Lilioideae
- Genus: Lilium
- Species: L. maculatum

Binomial name
- Lilium maculatum Thunb.

Synonyms
- Synonymy: Lilium elegans Thunb.; Lilium thunbergianum Schult. & Schult.f.; Lilium venustum Kunth; Lilium fortunei Lindl.; Lilium wilsonii T.Moore; Lilium alternans Siebold ex Duch.; Lilium coruscans Baker; Lilium batemanniae A.Wallace; Lilium bukosanense Honda, syn of var. bukosanense

= Lilium maculatum =

Species of lily

Lilium maculatum (スカシユリ/透百合/透かし百合, sukashi-yuri; "see-through lily") is a plant in the lily family native to Japan.

== Etymology ==
Its Japanese name is sukashi-yuri, literally "see-through lily" or perhaps "openwork lily", originates from the gaps between its tepals.

The plant is also called iwato-yuri or iwa yuri referring to its rocky habitat, or hama yuri from growing on the seashore.

In the Japanese horticultural trade, cultivated types are referred to as sukashiyuri while the wild-growing ones are called iwatoyuri. Furthermore, plants growing along the Pacific Ocean are called iwatoyuri, distinguished from iwayuri that grow on the coasts of the Sea of Japan.

== Range ==
Lilium maculatum is native to the central and northern regions of Japan, widely cultivated as an ornamental.

The perennial plan grows on sandy seashores, rocky areas, or cliff-tops.

== General description ==
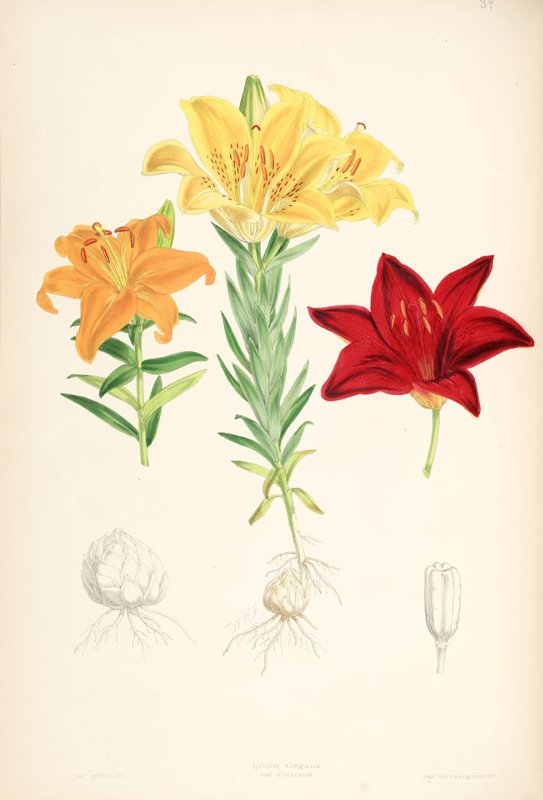
Garden varieties

It is a stem rooting lily, its bulbs are ovate and white, lacking bitterness. Parts of the scales on the bulb may be jointed. The stalk grows from 20 to 60 centimetres (7.9 to 23.6 in) tall, and bears a number of orange, red, or yellow flowers with darker spots. Sometimes the yellow lilies exhibit spotlessness

In Japan, plants growing on the Pacific coast (iwatoyuri) bloom from the latter half of June until early August, much later than the lilies on the coasts of the Sea of Japan (iwayuri) that bloom from the latter half of May to early June.

This species used to be considered one of the more important in food consumption as lily bulb or yuri-ne (ユリ根) around the turn of the 20th century.

== Varieties ==
Recognized cultivars

- Lilium maculatum var. bukosanense (Honda) H.Hara
- Lilium maculatum var. maculatum

The variety bukosanense (Japanese: miyamasukashi-yuri) was originally discovered on Mount Bukō in Saitama Prefecture near Tokyo, with scattered populations later found in Ibaraki Prefecture. The variety is unusual, as it is a "hanging" or "weeping" type with a pendulous stem, but is listed as critically endangered by Saitama's Red Data Book. The mountain has been heavily quarried for limestone by the cement industry, which now collaborates in the plant's conservation efforts in captivity; foraging by wildlife such as the Japanese macaque is also thought to jeopardizes its survival.

Japanese literature c. 1900 writes of several yellow varieties grown which had no spots, (Note: The yellow spotless varieties were given such names as Mangetsu "Full Moon", Ō-yamabuki "Great Kerria Rose", Tanima-no-Uguisu "Bush-Warbler of the Valley", Shirasagi "Egret", The Mangetsu "Full Moon" is mentioned by M. Shimizu in 1957.) but a warning was written against their export, while only spotted or lightly spotted varieties of these yellow lilies were being shipped to the West. Years later, the spotless yellow lilies were still considered few and elusive.

Formerly included

- Lilium maculatum subsp. dauricum (Ker Gawl.) H.Hara, now considered a synonym of Lilium pensylvanicum Ker Gawl.
- Lilium maculatum var. monticola H.Hara, now considered a synonym of Lilium maculatum var. maculatum
