= Sheffield & Hallamshire Minor Cup =

- Founded: 1882
- Abolished: 1896

The Sheffield & Hallamshire Minor Cup was a county cup competition organised by the Sheffield & Hallamshire County Football Association from 1882 to 1896.

== Finals ==
Season	Winner	Score	Runner-up	Venue	Notes
1882–83	Heeley reserves	3–1	Lockwood Brothers reserves	Newhall	
1883–84	Attercliffe reserves	2–0	Heeley reserves	Queen's Ground	
1884–85	Attercliffe reserves	6–1	Clarence	Bramall Lane	
1885–86	Attercliffe reserves	1–0	Eckington Works	Newhall.	
1886–87	Attercliffe reserves	1–0	Melville	Bramall Lane	
1887–88	Carbrook Church	2–1	Walkley	Bramall Lane	Replay, after original match (at Sheaf House) ended 3–3
1888–89	Ecclesfield reserves	6–1	Carbrook Church	Clifton Lane	
1889–90	Ecclesfield reserves	2–1	Melville	Bramall Lane	
1890–91	Wath	3–2	Heeley	Bramall Lane	
1891–92	Kiveton Park	3–0	Sheepbridge Works	Worksop	
1892–93	Pyebank Rovers	2–1	Heeley	Attercliffe	
1893–94	Pyebank Rovers	3–1	Ecclesfield	Woodhouse	League play-off final
1894–95	Wombwell Town	4–0	Rotherwood Rovers	Attercliffe	League play-off final
1895–96	Birdwell	2–1	North Staveley	Attercliffe	League play-off final

== See also ==
- Sheffield & Hallamshire County Cup
- Sheffield & Hallamshire County Senior League
- Sheffield & Hallamshire Senior Cup
- Sheffield & Hallamshire Association Cup
- Sheffield & Hallamshire Junior Cup
