= Ardsley Athletic F.C. =

Ardsley Athletic
- Full name: Ardsley Athletic Football Club

Ardsley Athletic F.C. was an English association football club based in Ardsley, Barnsley, South Yorkshire.

== History ==
The club was formed after the end of the First World War and entered local leagues in the Barnsley and South Yorkshire area. They first entered the FA Cup in 1920, eventually participating in the competition on twelve occasions. In 1928 they lost to Frickley Colliery in the final of the prestigious Sheffield Senior Cup, but a year later they went one better and beat Ecclesfield to lift the trophy.

=== Notable former players ===
Players that played in the Football League before or after playing for Ardsley Athletic –

- George Briggs
- Arnold Bonell
- Joe Cockroft
- Steve Griffiths
- Arthur Roberts

== Honours ==
- Sheffield Senior Cup – 1928–29

== Records ==
- Best FA Cup performance: 4th Qualifying Round, 1928–29
