= Thurcroft Welfare F.C. =

Thurcroft Welfare
- Full name: Thurcroft Welfare Football Club
- Founded: (as Thurcroft Main)

Thurcroft Welfare F.C. was an English association football club based in Thurcroft, Rotherham, South Yorkshire.

== History ==
The club was formed in the 1930s as Thurcroft Main and played in local Sheffield leagues. It won the Sheffield Association League title in 1943. They also won the Sheffield & Hallamshire Senior Cup (1947) and Wharncliffe Charity Cup (1955), as well as entering the FA Amateur Cup as Thurcroft Welfare.

=== League and cup history ===
Thurcroft Welfare League and Cup history
Season	Division	Position	FA Amateur Cup
1942–43	Sheffield Association League	1st	-
1945–46	Sheffield Association League Division 2		-
1946–47	Sheffield Association League		-
1947–48	Sheffield Association League		-
1948–49	Sheffield Association League		-
1951–52			?
1952–53			Preliminary Round
1957–58			Preliminary Round
1958–59			2nd Qualifying Round
1959–60			2nd Qualifying Round
1960–61			1st Qualifying Round
1961–62			Preliminary Round
1962–63			Preliminary Round
1963–64			Preliminary Round

== Honours ==
=== League ===
- Sheffield Association League
  - Champions: 1942–43

=== Cup ===
- Sheffield & Hallamshire Senior Cup
  - Winners: 1946–47
- Wharncliffe Charity Cup
  - Winners: 1954–55

== Records ==
- Best FA Amateur Cup performance: 2nd Qualifying Round, 1958–59
