= Eckington Works F.C. =

Football club in Derbyshire, England

Eckington Works
- Full name: Eckington Works Football Club
- Founded: 1880
- Dissolved: 1898?
- Ground: High Street
Home colours

Eckington Works Football Club was an English association football club based in Eckington, Derbyshire.

== History ==
The club was founded in 1880. The club was linked to a local iron works.

The club joined the Hallamshire FA originally, as new clubs were not eligible to join the Sheffield FA. The club won the Hallamshire Cup in 1883–84, notably beating Staveley, who went on to win the Derbyshire Senior Cup the same season, en route.

In 1885-86 the club entered the FA Cup for the first time, losing 2–1 at Sheffield Heeley, having taken the lead in the first half but conceded an equalizer within two minutes. With the last kick of the game, the Works' forward Levick scored directly from a corner, but as nobody had touched the ball en route, it was disallowed.

The following season the club earned its second victory in the Hallamshire Cup, beating Clinton 3–0 in the final.

In 1889 the club was a founder member of the Sheffield & District League. The club had been reasonably competitive until 1894–95, with 2,000 attending a benefit match for the club's half-back Johnny Gyte in March 1895, but lost a number of players at the end of 1895; after a 2–2 draw with Sheepbridge on 1 January, only seven players turned up for the next match, with Sheffield Wednesday reserves, resulting in an 18–0 defeat. Two weeks later Mexbro' went one better with a 19–0 win.

Crowds dropped to such an extent that a 5–0 defeat to Worksop at the end of January (played by agreement for 30 minutes each way) only had a crowd of 30. The club was only able to continue after club treasurer Mr Hardwick gave up claims to £20 he had loaned the club. At the season's close the club withdrew to run a junior side only.

The club joined the East Derbyshire League for 1896–97 but there is no trace of the team after 1898. A new team with the same name arose in 1920 and won the Sheffield Association League in 1923–24.

== Colours ==
The club's colours were listed simply as red. The club's ground may have been the cricket pitch a short walk away down Pipeyard Lane.

== Ground ==
The club played at Eckington High Street, using the Rose & Crown for facilities.

== Honours ==
- Sheffield and District Shield: Southern Division
  - Winners: 1894–95
- Hallamshire FA Senior Cup
  - Winners: 1883–84, 1886–87

== Records ==
- Furthest FA Cup run – 1st round 1885–86 and 1887–88
- Record victory: 12–1 v Ecclesfield, Sheffield and Hallamshire FA Cup (played as a league) 9 February 1895
- Record loss: 19–0 v Mexbro', Sheffield and Hallamshire FA Cup (as a league) 18 January 1896
