= Kilnhurst F.C. =

Kilnhurst
- Full name: Kilnhurst Football Club
- Nickname(s): Wasps
- Founded: 1877
- Dissolved: 1899
- Ground: Kilnhurst Ground
- Secretary: W. Crieton, S. Allerton
Home colours

Kilnhurst F.C. was an English association football club based in Kilnhurst, South Yorkshire.

== History ==
The club was founded in 1877, its first competitive football coming in the Hallamshire Cup in 1880–81. The club had a successful 1890–91 season, winning the Sheffield & District League, going through the season unbeaten at home, and only losing 2 of its 14 league matches and finishing the season with nearly £8 cash in hand.

It had a fierce rivalry with Mexborough, one match in 1893 at Kilnhurst resulting in criminal proceedings, as when a fight broke out between players, a spectator climbed over a 2' 6" wire fence to join in, and provoked a general mêlée that took 20 minutes to clear; the original spectator was fined 10s .

A home FA Cup tie with Sheffield F.C. in 1896 attracted a crowd of 2,000 to their home ground.

The club was defunct by 1898, and did not play any fixtures in the 1898–99 season; the club committee still existed and tried to raise funds to pay off debts, with a view to re-starting in 1899 free from debt, but the attempt was unsuccessful, and a fresh club started up in 1902.

=== League and cup history ===
Kilnhurst Colliery League and Cup history
Season	Division	Position	FA Cup
1890–91	Sheffield & District League	1st	3rd qualifying round
1891–92	Sheffield & District League	/10	2nd qualifying round
1892–93	Sheffield & District League	8th/14	2nd qualifying round
1893–94	Sheffield & District League Division 2	4th/5	1st qualifying round
1894–95	Sheffield Challenge Cup League	12th/15	1st qualifying round
1895–96	Sheffield Challenge Cup League	/15	2nd qualifying round
1896–97	Sheffield Association League	/10	2nd qualifying round
1897–98	Sheffield Association League	/12	2nd qualifying round

== Colours ==
The club played in black and yellow striped shirts, hence the club being nicknamed the Wasps; however such was its financial state that it did not have a regular change kit, having to borrow from other clubs when there was a clash - on one occasion, when no such change was available, the players wore "divers colours and patterns, generally speaking old-fashioned and faded".

== Ground ==
The club's ground was a field rented from William Henry Barton, of the Station Inn, who threatened to evict the club in 1892 on the basis that the club was skimming some of the admission takings to which he was entitled. The ground was sparse, with no grandstand or facilities, notable only for a chip shop at the entrance.
