= Ecclesfield F.C. =

Ecclesfield
- Full name: Ecclesfield Football Club
- Founded: 1873
- Dissolved: 1894
- Ground: Fairham's Croft
Home colours

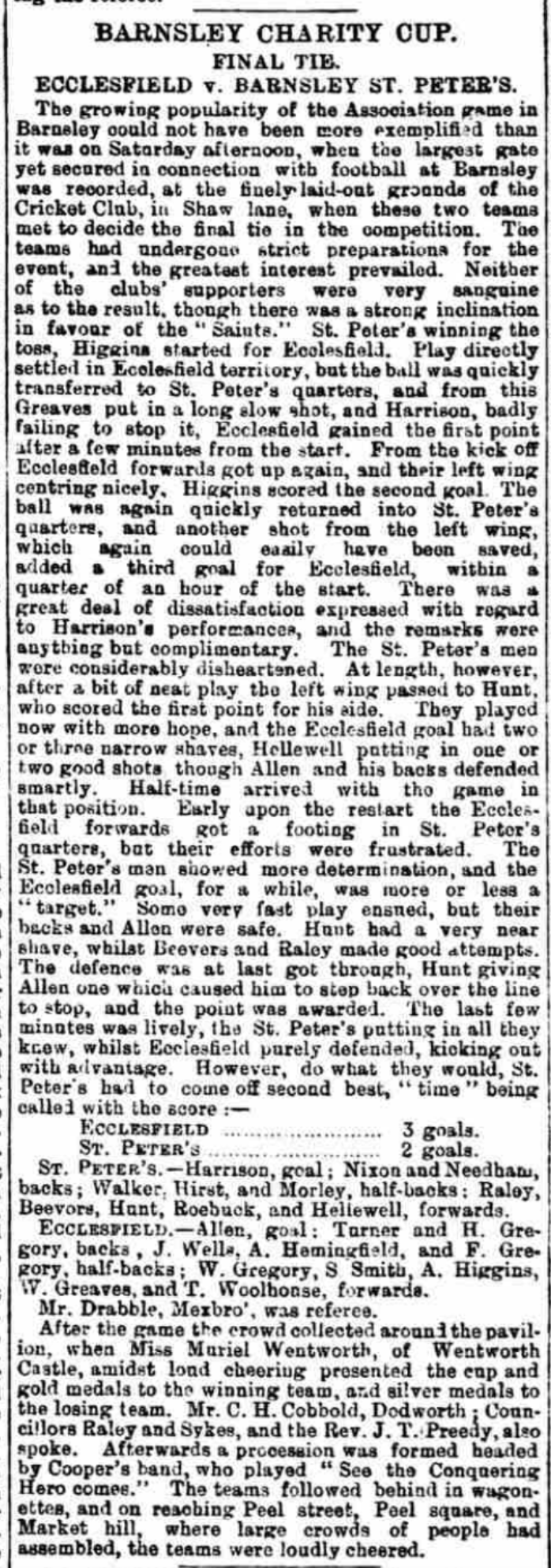
1891–92 Barnsley Charity Cup Final, Barnsley 2–3 Ecclesfield, Sheffield Independent, 21 March 1892

Ecclesfield F.C. was an English association football club based in Ecclesfield, South Yorkshire.

== History ==
The club was founded in 1873, at a time when football in the area was played to the Sheffield Football Association laws. Ecclesfield played at least 16 matches in its first season, although its game with Hallam was not finished after Hallam disputed a foul.

Ecclesfield did not enter the Sheffield Cup in 1876, but did reach the final in 1880–81, against Sheffield Wednesday at Bramall Lane. Ecclesfield undertook a course of special training for the match, and "for nearly three hours a continuous stream of spectators passed along the Pitsmoor Road" from the village. Ecclesfield took the lead after goalkeeper Stacey misjudged a shot from C. Cutts, and Hulley had a tap-in. However Ecclesfield's more brutal style of play worked against them - two players, trying to sandwich Stratford, instead collided with each other, and although both continued, neither made any further contribution to the match. By half-time Wednesday were 3–1 up, and Ecclesfield completely ran out of steam long before the end, the game ending 8–1; J. Cutts' ostensible long-distance consolation being disallowed because of a foul throw.

Ecclesfield entered the FA Cup for the first time in 1887–88, to prevent the loss of players; it had lost six before the start of the season to Lockwood Brothers, but four came back with the prospect of Cup football. The club was drawn at home to Derby Midland in the first round. The match generated the biggest crowd for the club "for some time" and a 4–1 win sent Ecclesfield into the second round. However at that stage Derby County proved too strong, winning 6–0, although Ecclesfield did have some chances, including hitting the bar in the second half.

The attraction of the bigger clubs and of the Football League prevented any further growth for the club. It entered the FA Cup twice more, but was forced into the new qualifying rounds, and did not win through to the main draw. Ecclesfield joined the Sheffield and District League on its foundation in 1889, and came close to the championship in 1890–91, finishing 2nd, one point behind Kilnhurst.

In 1891–92 Ecclefsield earned its greatest honour, winning the Barnsley Charity Cup - a trophy worth some £90 - by beating Barnsley St Peter's in the final.

However, after finishing near the bottom of the district league in 1892–93, the club dropped out of senior football. It was runner-up in the Sheffield & Hallamshire Minor Cup to Pyebank Rovers in 1893–94, and its final recorded match is a 7–0 defeat in the Sheffield Cup at Wednesday Reserves in September 1894. It was re-started at a lower level, with some of its old players, in 1896.

== Colours ==
The club originally wore amber and black. By 1894 the club was wearing white jerseys, possibly as an indication of a lack of resources, as when the club played Chesterfield (who also wore white) Ecclesfield did not have a change kit, and had to wear red scarves to distinguish the side.

== Ground ==
The club's ground was at Fairham's Croft in Ecclesfield.

== League and cup history ==
Ecclesfield League and Cup history
| Season | Division | Position | FA Cup |
|---|---|---|---|
| 1887–88 | - | - | 2nd Round |
| 1888–89 | - | - | 3rd qualifying round |
| 1889–90 | Sheffield & District League | unfinished | - |
| 1890–91 | Sheffield & District League | 2nd/8 | 3rd qualifying round |
| 1891–92 | Sheffield & District League | 6th/10 | - |
| 1892–93 | Sheffield & District League | 13th/14 | - |

== Records ==
- Best FA Cup performance: 2nd Round, 1887–88
