= The Zulus =

English football club

- Full name: The Zulus Football Club
- Founded: 1879
- Dissolved: 1882
- Ground: touring side
- Promoters: Messrs Brewer and Rolling
Home colours

The Zulus were a short-lived football team established in Sheffield, England that existed from 1879 to 1882. They were initially set up to raise funds for the wives and families of soldiers killed in the Zulu war. The team disbanded after accusations that they were bringing the game into disrepute and receiving payment for playing.

== Beginnings ==
In 1879, a match was played at Bramall Lane against a Sheffield XI to raise money for the widows and orphans of the soldiers killed that year in the Zulu war. They won their second game 5–4 (their first match took place in Scarborough). Many of the players were taken from local teams, especially The Wednesday. They played in an all-black kit and decorated themselves with beads and feathers and, instead of using their own names, they adopted Zulu names such as Ulmathoosi. After the success of the match, they started touring the country.

== The Zulus on tour ==
The tour started against Chesterfield touring the town in full costume before the match. They subsequently also took on teams from Barnsley and a combined team from Nottingham and Derby. After it transpired that players were receiving payments for playing they were subsequently banned from playing in official matches. The situation became critical in Sheffield where the 1881 Wharncliffe Charity Cup final was cancelled because of the number of players banned for professionalism. They subsequently also played in Edinburgh and had an offer to also tour South Africa. They never lost a match. However, they were forced to disband by the Sheffield F.A. in 1882.

== Aftermath ==
After increasing pressure from players and clubs, professionalism was legalised by The Football Association in 1885. However, opposition remained stronger in the Sheffield area. Sheffield's first professional football club, the short lived Sheffield Rovers, was formed mainly from players of the former Zulus team. The Wednesday followed suit the next year.
