= Wharncliffe Charity Cup =

- Founded: 1878
- Abolished: 1984

The Wharncliffe Charity Cup was an invitational cup competition organised by the Sheffield & Hallamshire County Football Association from 1878 to 1984.

The competition took its name from the Earl of Wharncliffe, who sponsored the event, and was held with the aim of raising money for local good causes.

== Finals ==
Season	Winner	Score	Runner-up	Venue	Notes
1878–79	The Wednesday	3 – 2	Heeley	Bramall Lane	
1879–80	Heeley	2 – 1	The Wednesday	Sheaf House	
1880–81	Not completed				
1881–82	The Wednesday	5 – 0	Heeley	Bramall Lane	
1882–83	The Wednesday	4 – 0	Pyebank	Bramall Lane	
1883–84	Lockwood Brothers	6 – 0	Pyebank	Bramall Lane	
1884–85	Heeley	4 – 0	The Wednesday	Bramall Lane	Replay; First game 1 – 1 at Bramall Lane
1885–86	The Wednesday	2 – 0	Heeley	Old Forge Ground	
1886–87	Staveley	3 – 0	The Wednesday	Bramall Lane	
1887–88	The Wednesday	2 – 0	Rotherham Town	Bramall Lane	
1888–89	Staveley	1 – 0	Rotherham Town	Olive Grove	
1889–90	Staveley	3 – 0	Rotherham Town	Olive Grove	2nd replay; First game 1 – 1 at Bramall Lane, Second game 1 – 1 at Olive Grove
1890–91	Not completed				
1891–92	Not completed				
1892–93	Not won			Olive Grove	The Wednesday and Sheffield United drew 0-0- competition declared 'unwon'
1893–94	Not played				
1894–95	Mexborough	n/a	Chesterfield	n/a	League format, played under the auspices of the Sheffield & District Football League
1895–96	Sheffield United reserves	n/a	Barnsley St. Peters	n/a	League format
1896–97	Sheffield United reserves	n/a	The Wednesday reserves	n/a	League format
1897–98	Not played				
1898–99	Not played				
1899–1900	The Wednesday F.C. reserves	n/a	Sheffield United reserves	n/a	League format
1900–01	Monk Bretton	2 – 1	Roundel	Old Forge Ground	
1901–02	Sheffield United reserves	n/a	The Wednesday reserves	n/a	League format
1902–03	The Wednesday reserves	n/a	Sheffield United reserves	n/a	League format
1903–04	Sheffield United reserves	n/a	Barnsley reserves	n/a	League format
1904–05	The Wednesday reserves	n/a	Denaby United	n/a	League format
1905–06	The Wednesday reserves	n/a	Sheffield United reserves	n/a	League format
1906–07	Sheffield United reserves	n/a	Rotherham County	n/a	League format
1907–08	The Wednesday reserves	3 – 2	Rotherham County	Bramall Lane	
1908–09	The Wednesday reserves	n/a	Sheffield United reserves	n/a	League format
1909–10	Barnsley reserves	3 – 1	Sheffield United reserves	Hillsborough	
1910–11	The Wednesday reserves	3 – 0	Sheffield United reserves	Hillsborough	
1911–12	Sheffield United reserves	2 – 1	South Kirkby Colliery	Hillsborough	
1912–13	Gainsborough Trinity	3 – 1	The Wednesday reserves	Central Avenue	Replay; First game 0 – 0 at Central Avenue
1913–14	Rotherham County	2 – 0	Sheffield United reserves	Hillsborough	
1914–15	The Wednesday reserves	4 – 1	Sheffield United reserves	Bramall Lane	
1915–16	Worksop Town	n/a		n/a	League format
1916–17	Not played				
1917–18	Not played				
1918–19	Not played				
1919–20	Maltby Main	-	Retford Town		Awarded to Retford Town ? - trophy is engraved Maltby Main F.C. for season 1919–20
1920–21	Rotherham County reserves	3 – 1	Frickley Colliery	Oakwell	
1921–22	The Wednesday reserves	3 – 1	Sheffield United reserves	Hillsborough	
1922–23	Doncaster Rovers	1 – 0	Scunthorpe & Lindsey United	Belle Vue	
1923–24	Sheffield United reserves	2 – 1	The Wednesday reserves	Hillsborough	
1924–25	The Wednesday reserves	3 – 1	Rotherham Town	Hillsborough	
1925–26	Sheffield United reserves		Wath Athletic	Hillsborough	
1926–27	Doncaster Rovers reserves	2 – 0	Barnsley reserves	Belle Vue	
1927–28	Sheffield United reserves	4 – 0	Worksop Town	Hillsborough	
1928–29	Doncaster Rovers reserves	2 – 0	Sheffield United reserves	Bramall Lane	
1929–30	Sheffield United reserves	6 – 3	Rotherham United reserves	Hillsborough	
1930–31	Sheffield Wednesday reserves	4 – 0	Sheffield United reserves	Bramall Lane	
1931–32	Sheffield United reserves	2 – 0	Sheffield Wednesday reserves	Hillsborough	
1932–33	Sheffield Wednesday reserves	2 – 1	Sheffield United reserves	Bramall Lane	
1933–34	Doncaster Rovers reserves	2 – 1	Barnsley reserves		
1934–35	Norton Woodseats	3 – 1	Goldthorpe United		
1935–36	Not played				
1936–37	Sheffield United 'A'	3 – 2	Dinnington Athletic	Shiregreen	
1937–38	Sheffield Wednesday 'A'	4 – 1	Sheffield United 'A'	Bramall Lane	
1938–39	Sheffield Wednesday 'A'	5 – 3	Norton Woodseats	Coach & Horses Ground	
1939–40	Not played				
1940–41	Thurcroft Welfare	3 – 0	Beighton Miners Welfare	Woodhouse	
1941–42	RASC	4 – 1	Sheffield Wednesday reserves	Hillsborough	
1942–43	RASC	2 – 1	Sheffield United reserves	Hillsborough	
1943–44	RASC	1 – 0	Sheffield United reserves	Bramall Lane	
1944–45	Thorncliffe Welfare				
1945–46	Thorncliffe Welfare	3 – 1	Greens Welfare		
1946–47	Thorncliffe Welfare				
1947–48	Not completed				Hoyland Common fielded ineligible player in final win over Penistone Church - competition voided
1948–49	Stocksbridge Works	2 – 0	YMCA	Penistone	
1949–50	Hoyland Common Athletic	1 – 0	Aughton Juniors		
1950–51	Aughton Juniors				
1951–52	Penistone Church		Aughton Juniors		
1952–53	Beighton Miners Welfare		Aughton Juniors		
1953–54	Thorncliffe Recreation	5 – 1	Parkgate Welfare		
1954–55	Brown Bayleys Steels & Greenhill Meths	-	-	-	Cup shared
1955–56	Thurcroft Main				
1956–57	Sheffield Wednesday youth	3 – 2	Sheffield	High Green	
1957–58	Sheffield Wednesday youth	6 – 0	Grenoside Sports	High Green	
1958–59	Sheffield Wednesday youth	4 – 3	Thurcroft Main	High Green	
1959–60	Thorncliffe Recreation	4 – 2	Sheffield Wednesday youth	High Green	
1960–61	Harworth Colliery Institute	3 – 2	Thorncliffe Recreation	Thurcroft	Fri 12 May
1961–62	Retford Town reserves	4 – 2	Y.M.C.A. (Sheffield)	Swallownest Miners Welfare	Sat 12 May
1962–63	Harworth Colliery Institute	5 – 2	Hillsborough Select	Retford Town	Sat 1 June
1963–64	Swallownest Miners Welfare		Steel, Peech & Tozer		
1964–65	Maltby Miners Welfare				
1965–66	Frecheville Community Association				
1966–67	Frecheville Community Association	3 – 1	Kiveton Park United	Swallownest Miners Welfare	
1967–68	Charlton United				
1968–69	Swallownest Miners Welfare	1 – 0	Windsor British Legion	Kiveton Park	
1969–70	Thurcroft Welfare				
1970–71	Hallam				
1971–72	Ecclesfield Red Rose				
1972–73	Charlton United				
1973–74	Heeley Amateurs				
1974–75	Kiveton Park	1 – 0	Maltby Miners Welfare	Swallownest Miners Welfare	Mon 19 May
1975–76	Harworth Colliery Institute	3 – 1	Kiveton Park	Denaby United	Mon 10 May
1976–77	Norton Woodseats				
1977–78	Mosborough Trinity				
1978–79	Charlton Tavern	1 – 1 (p)	Maltby Miners Welfare		
1979–80	Maltby Miners Welfare				
1980–81	Not played				
1981–82	Not played				
1982–83	Frecheville Community Association				
1983–84	Kiveton Park	2 – 1	Hallam	Kiveton Park	

== See also ==
- Sheffield & Hallamshire County Cup
- Sheffield & Hallamshire County Senior League
- Sheffield & Hallamshire Senior Cup
