= Jack Dungworth =

English footballer

Personal information
- Place of birth: Heeley, Sheffield, England
- Date of death: 1936

Senior career*
Years	Team	Apps	(Gls)
- Sheffield Wednesday F.C.
- * Club domestic league appearances and goals

Jack Dungworth (Heeley, c.1866 – 1936) was an English footballer who played as a right-half, and was one of the pioneers of man-to-man marking. A successful runner in his youth, Dungworth began his football career with junior side Meersbrook Rangers before joining The Wednesday in 1881, aged 15, and making his senior debut three years later. Despite remaining amateur and continuing to work as a table knife hafter when his club went professional, Dungworth retained his place in the team, winning the Football Alliance in 1889–90 and featuring in the 1890 FA Cup Final, which The Wednesday lost 6–1 to Blackburn Rovers. After losing his place to Harry Brandon, he retired around 1892, and ran the Queens Head Hotel on Bramall Lane until he filed for bankruptcy in 1895, citing bad trade and disagreements with his wife. In 1906, his four-year-old daughter died of burns after playing with matches; he outlived her by thirty years, dying in 1936, aged 70.
