= Steve Griffiths (footballer) =

English footballer (1914–1998)

Personal information
- Full name: James Stephen Griffiths
- Date of birth: 23 February 1914
- Place of birth: Stairfoot, England
- Date of death: 10 June 1998 (aged 84)
- Height: 5 ft 8 in (1.73 m)
- Position: Inside forward

Senior career*
| Years | Team | Apps | (Gls) |
- Ardsley Athletic
- Barnsley Main
| ?–1934 | Thurnscoe Victoria | | |
| 1934–1937 | Chesterfield | 0 | (0) |
| 1937–1939 | Halifax Town | 75 | (14) |
| 1939–1946 | Portsmouth | 0 | (0) |
| 1946–1947 | Aldershot | 42 | (9) |
| 1947–1951 | Barnsley | 65 | (29) |
| 1951–1953 | York City | 74 | (12) |
- * Club domestic league appearances and goals

James Stephen Griffiths (23 February 1914 – 10 June 1998) was an English footballer who played for Halifax Town, Aldershot, Barnsley and York City in the Football League.

== Career ==
Born in Stairfoot, which was then in the West Riding of Yorkshire, Griffiths played for Ardsley Athletic, Barnsley Main and Thurnscoe Victoria before signing for Chesterfield of the Football League in October 1934. After failing to make any league appearances for Chesterfield, he joined Halifax Town in July 1937. After making 75 appearances and scoring 14 goals in the league, Everton tried to sign him, but he eventually joined Portsmouth for a fee of £750 in June 1939. Due to the outbreak of the Second World War, he was unable to play for them in the First Division, although he was in the team that lost 2–0 to Brentford in the 1942 War Cup Final. He joined Aldershot in June 1946, making 42 appearances and scoring nine goals in the league in the 1946–47 season, before signing for Barnsley for a fee of £300 in July 1947. After making 65 appearances and scoring 29 goals in the league, he joined York City in June 1951. He was captain for two seasons, making 78 appearances and scoring 12 goals, before retiring in 1953 after being unsuccessful in his application for the role of manager at York.

== Personal life ==
During the war, Griffiths served on HMS Adamant and played football for the English Combined Services team. He died on 10 June 1998 at the age of 84. He was outlived by his wife Dorothy, who died in 2011 at the age of 87 following a fall at a Wombwell nursing home. They had a daughter, Jean, and a son Stephen.
