= Stan Burton =

English footballer (1912–1977)

Personal information
- Full name: Stanley Burton
- Date of birth: 3 December 1912
- Place of birth: Wombwell, near Barnsley, England
- Date of death: 1977 (aged 64–65)
- Place of death: Sheffield, England
- Height: 5 ft 7 1/2 in (1.71 m)
- Position: Winger

Senior career*
| Years | Team | Apps | (Gls) |
| ????–1933 | Thurnscoe Victoria | | |
| 1933–1938 | Doncaster Rovers | 196 | (50) |
| 1938–1939 | Wolverhampton Wanderers | 28 | (3) |
| 1939 | West Ham United | 4 | (0) |
| 1946–1947 | Frickley Colliery | | |
| 1947–1948 | Peterborough United | 35 | (3) |
- * Club domestic league appearances and goals

Stanley Burton (3 December 1912 – 1977), also known as Dizzie Burton, was an English footballer who played mainly for Doncaster Rovers and appeared in the 1939 FA Cup final for Wolverhampton Wanderers.

He was partially deaf, and so did not play to the whistle. His nickname of "Dizzie" was due to him continuing runs after the referee had blown.

== Career ==
Burton began his career at Thurnscoe Victoria, moving to Doncaster Rovers in March 1933, where he immediately commanded a first team place on the right wing. He went on to have over 5 seasons of success at the club, including winning the Third Division North in 1934–35 and being runners-up in 1937–38. His goal scoring reached double figures in each of the three seasons from 1933 to 1936, with a hat−trick in a 2–3 win at Hull City on 19 October 1935.

A few games into the 1938–39 season, Burton moved to First Division Wolverhampton Wanderers. He made his Wolves debut on 10 September 1938 in a 1–0 win at Brentford and made 32 appearances and scored 4 goals during the season which saw them reach the FA Cup final. Burton played in the Wembley showpiece where they lost to underdogs Portsmouth.

This turned out to be his only season at Molineux though, as he headed south to join West Ham United in the Second Division. Burton signed for West Ham only five days after his Wembley appearance for Wolves. In doing so he became the first player to appear in an FA Cup final and play for another club before the end of the season. He made his debut in the last game of the season and then played in all three of West Hams games the following season before competitive football was suspended due to the Second World War.

Moving back north, he did play as a guest in the Wartime Leagues for several clubs. Beginning with Doncaster, he played in 60 games scoring 11 times between 1939 and the 1941–42 season. He played once for Barnsley in 1941–42, and three times the following season. His one game with Leeds United was in the last fixture of the 1941–42 Football League Northern Section (Second Championship). In season 1942–43 he played 23 matches, scoring 8 times, with Chesterfield, and then in 1943–44 he made three appearances for Sheffield Wednesday. 1944–45 saw him with Bradford City where he got one goal in 14 matches.

After end of the war, Burton played for Midland League club Frickley Colliery as well as Midland League rivals Peterborough United for a single season, 1947–48.

He died in 1977 in Sheffield.

== Honours ==
Doncaster Rovers

- Football League Third Division North: 1934–35

Wolverhampton Wanderers

- FA Cup runner-up: 1938–39
