= Pyebank F.C. (1888) =

Pyebank
- Full name: Pyebank Football Club
- Founded: 1888
- Dissolved: 1900
- Ground: Crosspool
Home colours

Pyebank F.C. was an English association football club based in Sheffield, South Yorkshire.

== History ==
The earliest reference to the club is as Pyebank Rovers in 1888. In 1893 the club reached the final of the Sheffield Minor Cup, and seemed to have beaten Heeley, but the Heeleyites protested against goalkeeper Rudkin as being ineligible, as the final was his first game of the season; the protest was upheld and the final ordered to be replayed. Nevertheless, the Rovers won the replay (at Attercliffe's Carsbrook ground) 2–1. The performance was particularly impressive as Rovers had only finished mid-table in the Minor League.

The club retained the trophy in 1893–94 with a 3–1 win over Ecclesfield, but it was put under suspension in early 1895 for financial indiscretions including the club's regular linesman Tingle being caught placing illegal bets, and never got going again. In effect it seems to have been absorbed into the Pyebank Reds club, which had had a fitful existence since 1893, but for which records increase from the 1895–96 season. The club dropped the Reds at the start of 1899 and the club became known simply as Pyebank.

Although the club entered the 1899–1900 FA Cup qualifying rounds, losing 6–0 at Mexborough in its only tie, the season was the club's last. It finished bottom of the Sheffield Association League First Division, with only 2 wins in 14 games, and did not re-emerge for the following season,

== Ground ==
The club originally played at Crosspool. By 1899 it was playing at Roe Wood.

== Records ==
- Best FA Cup performance: Preliminary Round, 1899–1900
