= Ardsley, South Yorkshire =

Village in South Yorkshire, England

Coordinates: 53.5463°N 1.4254°W

Ardsley
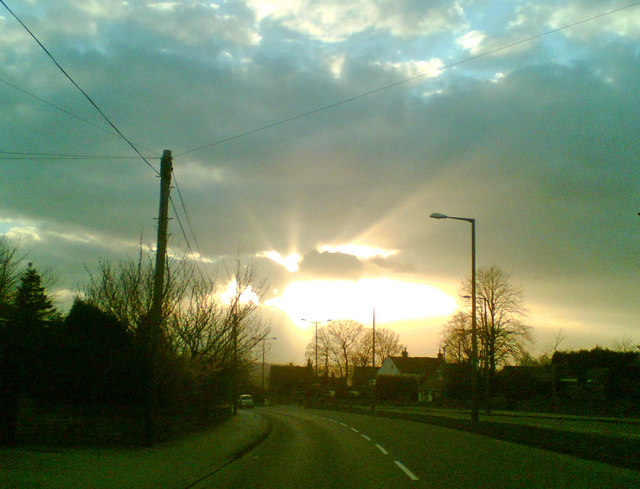
- Sunburst over the A635 in Ardsley

- Location within South Yorkshire
- OS grid reference: SE381056
  - London: 155 mi (249 km) SSE
- Metropolitan borough: Barnsley
- Metropolitan county: South Yorkshire
- Region: Yorkshire and the Humber
- Country: England
- Sovereign state: United Kingdom
- Post town: BARNSLEY
- Postcode district: S70-S75
- Dialling code: 01226
- Police: South Yorkshire
- Fire: South Yorkshire
- Ambulance: Yorkshire
- UK Parliament: Barnsley South

Ardsley is a village approximately 3 miles (5 km) east from Barnsley and forms part of the metropolitan borough of Barnsley of South Yorkshire, England. The village is in the Stairfoot ward of Barnsley Metropolitan Council. It is historically part of the West Riding of Yorkshire. The A635 (or Doncaster Road) divides the village into two parts.

The Ardsley House Hotel was one of the key features of the village, however the hotel entered administration in March 2014 and subsequently closed down in July 2014. There is a small primary school, named Oakhill Primary Academy (previously named Ardsley Oaks Junior School and then Oakhill Primary School), and an Anglican church (Christ Church).

== History ==
The name Ardsley derives from the Old English eorredslēah or eanredslēah meaning 'Eorred's' or 'Eanred's wood or clearing'.

Ardsley was formerly a township and chapelry in the parish of Darfield. In 1866, Ardsley became a separate civil parish; on 9 November 1921 the parish was abolished and merged with Barnsley. In 1921, the parish had a population of 7059. From 1894 to 1921, Ardsley was an urban district which contained the parish. It is now in the unparished area of Barnsley.

== Sport ==
Two football teams from the village have played in the FA Cup: Ardsley F.C. and Ardsley Athletic F.C.
