= John Webster (footballer) =

English footballer

Personal information
- Full name: John Webster
- Place of birth: Sheffield, England
- Position: Winger

Senior career*
Years	Team	Apps	(Gls)
1889–1893	Attercliffe		
1893–1895	The Wednesday	23	(5)
1895–1896	Rotherham Town	23	(3)
1896–1898	Gainsborough Trinity	47	(7)
Total		93	(15)
- * Club domestic league appearances and goals

John Webster was an English footballer who played in the Football League for Gainsborough Trinity, Rotherham Town and The Wednesday.
