= William Carr (footballer, born 1848) =

English footballer

Personal information
- Full name: William Henry Carr
- Date of birth: 15 November 1848
- Place of birth: Sheffield, England
- Date of death: 22 February 1924 (aged 75)
- Position: Goalkeeper

Senior career*
Years	Team	Apps	(Gls)
- Owlerton

International career
1875	England	1	(0)
- * Club domestic league appearances and goals

William Henry Carr (15 November 1848 – 22 February 1924) was an England international footballer who played as a goalkeeper.

== Career ==
Born in Sheffield, Carr played for Owlerton, and earned one cap for England in 1875.
