= Albert Mumford =

English footballer

Personal information
- Full name: Albert Corbett Mumford
- Date of birth: 7 June 1865
- Place of birth: Wellington, England
- Date of death: 30 June 1926 (aged 61)
- Place of death: Loughborough, England
- Position: Defender

Senior career*
Years	Team	Apps	(Gls)
–1887	Clinton		
1887–1896	Sheffield Wednesday	23	(1)
- * Club domestic league appearances and goals

Albert Corbett Mumford (7 June 1865 – 30 June 1926) was an English footballer who played in The Football League for Sheffield Wednesday., and scored Wednesday's goal in the 1890 FA Cup Final.
