= Albert Smith (footballer, born 1869) =

English footballer

Personal information
- Date of birth: 23 July 1869
- Place of birth: Nottingham, England
- Date of death: 18 April 1921 (aged 51)
- Position: Right half

Senior career*
Years	Team	Apps	(Gls)
1889–1890	Notts County	4	(0)
1892–1894	Nottingham Forest	26	(1)
Total		30	(1)

International career
1891–1893	England	3	(0)
- * Club domestic league appearances and goals

Albert Smith (23 July 1869 – 18 April 1921) was an English international footballer, who played as a right half.

== Career ==
Born in Nottingham, Smith played professionally for Notts County and Nottingham Forest, and earned three caps for England between 1891 and 1893.
