= Sheffield & District Football League =

- Founded: 1889
- Folded: 1896
- Country: England

The Sheffield & District Football League was an English association football league based in Sheffield, South Yorkshire, and surrounding area.

== History ==
The league was founded in time for the 1889/90 season, with 8 clubs, being one of the first ever league competitions. Kilnhurst took the first two titles, in the first season overhauling a Clinton side which had won its first 7 matches, but did not win in its last 7. in Chesterfield Town won the 1892 title, and Wednesday Wanderers, the reserve team of Sheffield Wednesday, lifted the shield in 1893.

The 1893/94 competition saw the league split into two divisions of five, with the two group winners, Wednesday Wanderers and Mexborough, meeting in a play-off to decide the title winners, with the Mexburians winning the game 1-0 at Oakwell. The 1894/95 competition was again split in two, with the six strongest teams being placed into the top division, with the winners Mexborough being awarded the Wharncliffe Charity Cup. Below the top division that year, there was a shield competition for another nine sides, with Eckington Works beating Wath in a play-off final.

The league was disbanded in the summer of 1896, with the Sheffield Association League effectively taking its place.

== Champions ==
Season	
1889–90	Kilnhurst
1890–91	Kilnhurst
1891–92	Chesterfield Town
1892–93	Wednesday Wanderers
1893-94	Mexborough
1894-95	Eckington Works
1895-96	Kilnhurst
