= Thursday Wanderers F.C. =

Defunct association football club from Sheffield

- Full name: Thursday Wanderers Football Club
- Founded: 1870
- Dissolved: 1879
- Ground: Hunter's Bar, Sheffield
- Secretary: James Wild, J. H. Barber jr
Home colours

Thursday Wanderers Football Club was an association football club from Sheffield, Yorkshire, which originally played to the Sheffield rules of the game, until the merger of Sheffield rules with those of the Football Association in 1877.

== History ==
The club was founded in 1870 as the Bankers Football Club, and its first secretary, J. H. Liddell, worked at the Sheffield Union Bank; the club adhered to the Sheffield code. In September 1874 the club resolved to change its name to the Thursday Wanderers, Thursday afternoon being the favoured time for the club to hold matches.

The club entered the first Sheffield Senior Cup in 1876–77, recruiting some of the Sheffield F.C. players (such as the Sorby brothers and W. A. Matthews) for the competition, as Club decided not to enter. It was to no avail, as the Wanderers lost 5–4 to eventual finalists Heeley in the first round, conceding a winner with five minutes remaining.

One Wanderers player, Thomas Sorby, had the honour of being selected for England at the start of 1879; Sorby not only played for England against Wales, but scored one of the two England goals.

The Wanderers reached the final of the Sheffield Senior Cup in 1878–79, to be played at Bramall Lane against Heeley; the run was something of a surprise as the Wanderers only had 39 members, which made them one of the smallest clubs in the city. The Wanderers brought in three outside players - Arthur and Henry Cursham, and E. G. Greenhalgh, all from Notts County, towards the end of the previous season, so that they would qualify for the tournament - and after changing ends at half-time one goal down, Ellison (who had a habit of leaving his goal in pursuit of the ball) swapped places with forward Richard Sorby, "for the purpose of bringing into action his heavy powers of charging". The switch worked as two Wanderers goals from two scrimmages - the second thanks to Ellison piling in at the last - turned the game, and a third from Hugh Wood secured the Cup for the Wanderers.

This was simultaneously the acme and swansong for the club; it did not renew membership of the Sheffield Association, so in October 1879 was struck from the member roll. The Wanderers had in effect been absorbed into Sheffield F.C., as six of its eight "non-ringer" players from the final line-up (Ellison, Beardshaw, J. H. Barber, Matthews, Wood, and Thomas Sorby) featured for Sheffield in the 1879–80 FA Cup. The Wanderers name did not appear again until 1882, when it provided an XI for a one-off match in a doomed revival attempt, drawing 2–2 with a scratch side known as P. H. Morton's XI at Bramall Lane - only four of the side had played in the 1879 Cup final. A second attempted revival in 1886, this time with only one of the 1879 finalists (T. C. Willey), also only lasted one match.

== Colours ==
The club originally played in scarlet, changing by 1877 to scarlet and navy.

== Ground ==
The club played at Hunter's Bar, two miles from Sheffield railway station. It had facilities on the ground and the club shared the ground with Lockwood Brothers. The 1886 version hosted its one match at Dark Lane.

== Notable players ==
- Thomas Sorby, capped for England while a Wanderer; considered one of the leading players in Sheffield and rated for dribbling, but not for his selfishness on the pitch.
- Hugh Wood, who also played for Yorkshire County Cricket Club in 1879 and 1880.
