= Beighton Miners Welfare F.C. =

Beighton Miners Welfare
- Full name: Beighton Miners Welfare Football Club
- Founded: (as Beighton Recreation)

Beighton Miners Welfare F.C. was an English association football club based in Beighton, Sheffield, South Yorkshire.

== History ==
Starting from the first qualifying round, they reached the first round of the FA Cup in 1953, where they were beaten by Wrexham at Millmoor. During this era they were also members of the Yorkshire League and won the prestigious Sheffield Senior Cup on two occasions.

== Honours ==
=== League ===
- Yorkshire League Division 1
  - Runners-up: 1952–53
- Yorkshire League Division 2
  - Promoted: 1949–50
- Hatchard League
  - Champions: 1919–20 (shared), 1920–21

=== Cup ===
- Sheffield Senior Cup
  - Winners: 1939–40, 1955–56
  - Runners-up: 1940–41, 1947–48, 1949–50, 1952–53
- Aston-cum-Aughton Charity Cup
  - Runners-up: 1903–04

== Records ==
- Best League performance: Yorkshire League Division 1, 1952–53
- Best FA Cup performance: 1st Round, 1952–53
