= 1876–77 Sheffield Challenge Cup =

1876-77 Sheffield Senior Cup
Tournament details
- Country: England
- Venue: Yorkshire
- Dates: 28 October 1876 - 10 March 1877
- Teams: 25

Final positions
- Champions: The Wednesday
- Runners-up: Heeley

The 1876-77 Sheffield Senior Cup was the first edition of the tournament, played to Sheffield rules. It was the biggest tournament played to the Sheffield code and the equivalent of the FA Cup, which at the time was mostly confined to the south of England.

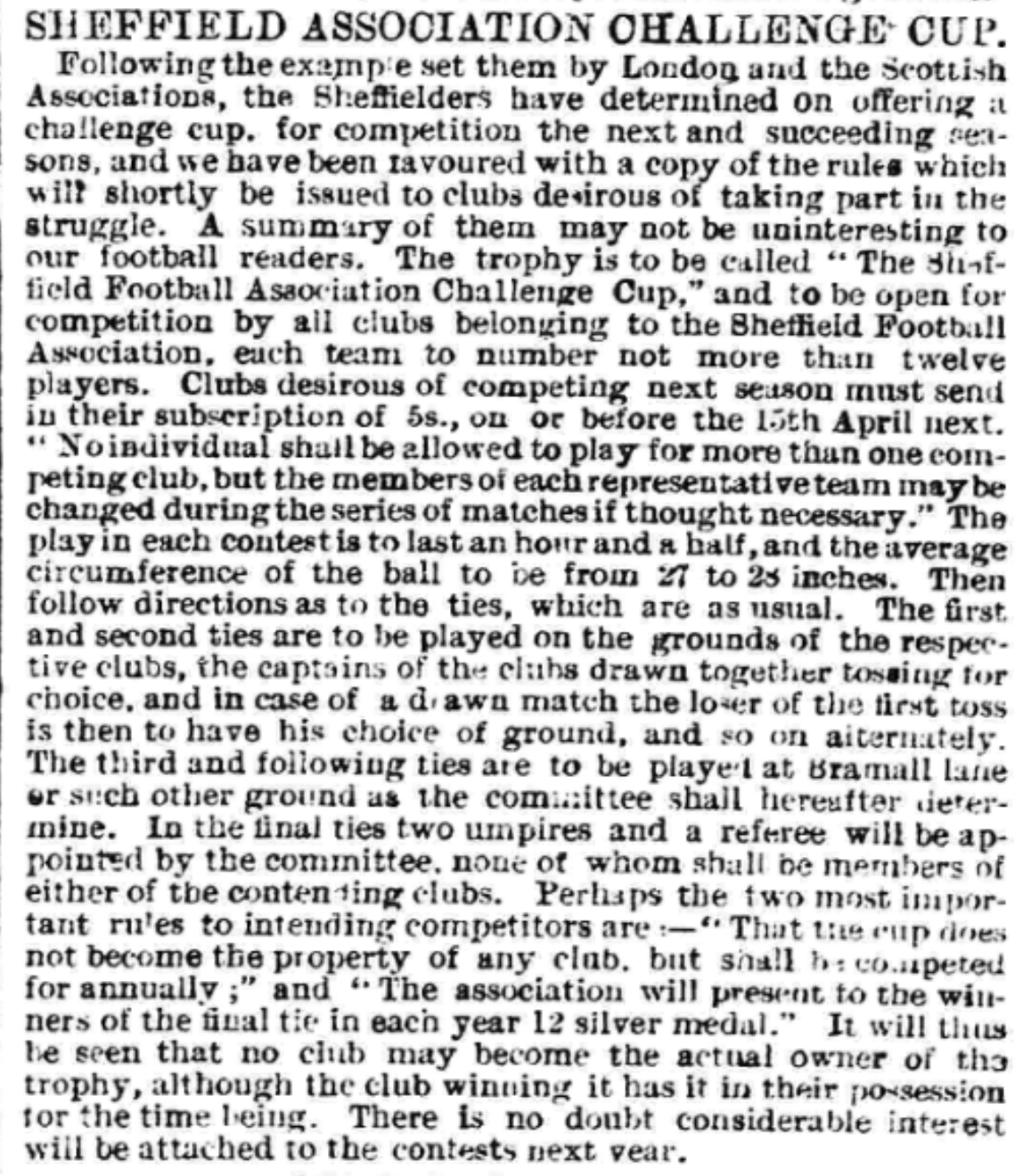
Announcement of the Sheffield Association Challenge Cup, Sheffield Independent, 25 March 1876

== Background ==
The Sheffield Football Association was founded in 1867 and took a subscription of 5 shillings from its member clubs in order to entitle them to entry. Sheffield F.C. did not enter, as the club was concentrating on national matches.

The Sheffield rules in force at the time had four main differences to the Association laws:

- players were onside so long as one opponent was between them and the goal-line, whereas the Association offside law demanded three;
- if the ball went off the side of the pitch, it was put back into play by a kick-in, rather than a throw-in, in any direction;
- if the attacking team put the ball out of play to the side of the goal, the defending team returned the ball from the nearest corner;
- if either team put the ball out of play over the bar of the goal, the defending team returned the ball from within 6 yards of their goal.

At the time, neither the Association nor Sheffield codes prescribed the number of players per side, and the size of the teams was a matter for negotiation between the captains or the relevant tournament rules. By 1876, most matches were 11 per side, and this was the rule in the FA Cup. For this tournament, the Sheffield FA mandated 12 men per side, as did the Birmingham Senior Cup the same year.

== Participating teams ==
Participating clubs
Team	Foundation	No. of members	Home ground	Colours
Albion	1872	50	Ecclesall Road	Blue & white hoops
Attercliffe	1870	120	Shirland Lane	Blue & white
Brincliffe	1868	80	Hunter's Bar	Black & white
Broomhall	1868	150	Ecclesall Road (south)	Black & white
Crookes	1870	140	Crookes (3 miles from Sheffield Stn)	White & red
Endcliffe	1873	60	Ecclesall Road	Navy blue
Exchange	1863	200	Quibell's Field	Scarlet & white
Exchange Brewery	1871	100	Fox Street	Amber & black
Fir Vale	1862	135	Pyper Lane, Pitsmoor	White & scarlet trimmings
Gleadless	1870	98	Gleadless, 3 miles from Midland Stn	White
Hallam	1860	200	Sandygate	Blue & white
Heeley	1862	70	Meersbrook Park	Grey & white stripes
Kimberworth	1871	70	Queen's Grounds	Blue & white
Millhouses	1871	130	Millhouses, close to Ecclesall Stn	Scarlet & black
Norfolk	1861	200	Norfolk Park	Scarlet & white
Norfolk Works	1872	50	Brightside	Blue & white hoops
Owlerton	1873	140	Rawson's Meadows	Scarlet & black hoops
Oxford	1869	140	Hunter's Bar	Blue & yellow
Parkwood Springs	1870	150	Parkwood Springs, 1.5 mi from Victoria Stn	White, with amber and black caps
Philadelphia	1873	70	Hillsborough	Blue caps
Providence	1874	80	Sharf Road	Red & white
Rotherham	1870	100	Clinton Lane	Scarlet & white
Thursday Wanderers	1870	80	Hunter's Bar	Scarlet & navy blue
Walkley	1870	110	Hillsbrough	Red & white
The Wednesday	1867	250	Myrtle Road	Blue & white hoops

== Format ==
The competition was organised as a straight knockout tournament, with replays to a conclusion. The captains would toss for choice of venue, the captain who lost the toss could choose the venue for a replay, and second replays were to be at the first captain's choice again.

== Results ==
=== First round ===
Date	Home	Score	Away
21 October 1876	Wednesday	3–1	Parkwood Springs
28 October 1876	Philadelphia	1–0	Norfolk
28 October 1876	Exchange	3–0	Rotherham
2 November 1876	Thursday W	4–5	Heeley
4 November 1876	Fir Vale	5–1	Oxford
4 November 1876	Brincliffe	7–1	Exchange Brewery
4 November 1876	Attercliffe	2–2	Albion
4 November 1876	Broomhall	0–1	Millhouses
4 November 1876	Hallam	2–1	Owlerton
4 November 1876	Kimberworth	2–0	Walkley
4 November 1876	Norfolk Works	3–1	Gleadless
4 November 1876	Providemce	0–0	Crookes
	Endcliffe	bye	

=== Replays ===
Date	Home	Score	Away
11 November 1876	Crookes	1–4	Providence
13 November 1876	Albion	2–2	Attercliffe
28 November 1876	Attercliffe	2–0	Albion

=== Second round ===
Date	Home	Score	Away
2 December 1876	Brincliffe	2–1	Millhouses
2 December 1876	Kimberworth	0–1	Wednesday
2 December 1876	Providence	0–0	Norfolk Works
2 December 1876	Hallam	2–1	Fir Vale
2 December 1876	Heeley	1–0	Endcliffe
4 December 1876	Exchange	3–0	Philadelphia
	Attercliffe	bye	

=== Replay ===
Date	Home	Score	Away
9 December 1876	Norfolk Works	0–2	Providence

=== Third round ===
The ties in the third round and semi-finals were due to be played at Bramall Lane, but the third round ties were all played according to the captain's toss rule. Curiously, all three ties went the way of the away side.

Date	Home	Score	Away
26 December 1876	Hallam	3–7	Heeley
1 January 1877	Attercliffe	0–1	Wednesday
6 January 1877	Brincliffe	0–2	Exchange
	Providence	bye	

=== Semi-finals ===
The semi-finals were played at Bramall Lane, one after the other, before a crowd of six or seven thousand.

Date	Home	Score	Away
3 February 1877	Heeley	3–2	Providence
3 February 1877	Wednesday	3–1	Exchange

=== Final ===
The final was a thriller, with Heeley taking a three-goal lead by half-time, but Wednesday fighting back to take the game to half-an-hour extra-time.

10 March 1877

Wednesday	4–3 a.e.t.	Heeley
F.M. Butler; T.M.Butler; W.E.Clegg; W.E.Skinner 115'		R.Martin; J.Hunter; W.H. Stacey (own goal)

Bramall Lane
Attendance: 7-8,000
Referee: J.C. Shaw

The Wednesday	Heeley
