= Alec Wallace (Australian footballer) =

Australian rules footballer

Personal information
- Full name: Alexander Henderson Wallace
- Born: 31 July 1881; Wandiligong, Victoria
- Died: 30 June 1954 (aged 72); Glen Iris, Victoria

Playing career^{1}
Years	Club	Games (Goals)
1899	St Kilda	2 (0)
1902	South Melbourne	2 (0)
Total		4 (0)
- ^{1} Playing statistics correct to the end of 1802.

Alec Wallace (31 July 1881 – 30 June 1954) was an Australian rules footballer who played for the St Kilda Football Club and South Melbourne Football Club in the Victorian Football League (VFL).
