= Billy Ingram =

English footballer

Personal information
- Full name: William Ingram
- Date of birth: 11 December 1865
- Place of birth: Sheffield, England
- Date of death: 19 March 1947 (aged 81)

Senior career*
Years	Team	Apps	(Gls)
–1887	Clinton		
1887–1891	Sheffield Wednesday	0	(0)
- * Club domestic league appearances and goals

Billy Ingram (11 December 1865 – 19 March 1947) was an English footballer who played for Sheffield Wednesday in the 1890 FA Cup Final.
