= Billy Betts =

English footballer (1864–1941)

Personal information
- Full name: William Betts
- Date of birth: 26 March 1864
- Place of birth: Sheffield, England
- Date of death: 8 August 1941 (aged 77)
- Place of death: Sheffield, England
- Height: 5 ft 7 in (1.70 m)
- Position: Defender

Senior career*
| Years | Team | Apps | (Gls) |
| 1881–1882 | Pyebank | 0 | (0) |
| 1882–1883 | Heeley | 0 | (0) |
| 1883 | The Wednesday | 0 | (0) |
| 1883–1887 | Lockwood Brothers | 0 | (0) |
| 1887–1895 | The Wednesday | 109 | (3) |

International career
| 1889 | England | 1 | (0) |
- * Club domestic league appearances and goals

William Betts (26 March 1864 – 8 August 1941) was an English footballer who played for The Wednesday, as well as the England national side. Betts played as a centre-half and made a total of 143 appearances in two spells for The Wednesday, scoring four goals.
