= Alexander Wallace (footballer) =

English footballer

Personal information
- Full name: Alexander James John Wallace
- Date of birth: 1874
- Place of birth: Sheffield, England
- Date of death: 1899 (aged 24–25)
- Place of death: Gibraltar
- Position: Goalkeeper

Senior career*
Years	Team	Apps	(Gls)
1894–1896	Attercliffe		
1896–1897	Grimsby Town	20	(0)
- * Club domestic league appearances and goals

Alexander James John Wallace (1874 – 1899) was an English professional footballer who played as a goalkeeper.
