= Thurnscoe Victoria F.C. =

Thurnscoe Victoria
- Full name: Thurnscoe Victoria Football Club

Thurnscoe Victoria Football Club was an English association football club based in Thurnscoe, South Yorkshire.

== History ==
=== League and cup history ===
Thurnscoe Victoria League and Cup history
Season	FA Cup
1930–31	2nd qualifying round
1931–32	Preliminary round
1932–33	Preliminary round
1933–34	2nd qualifying round
1934–35	Preliminary round
1935–36	Extra preliminary round
1936–37	Preliminary round
1937–38	Extra preliminary round
1938–39	Preliminary round
1946–47	Preliminary round
1947–48	Preliminary round

== Records ==
- Best FA Cup performance: 2nd qualifying round, 1930–31, 1933–34

== Former players ==
1. Players that have played/managed in the Football League or any foreign equivalent to this level (i.e. fully professional league).
2. Players with full international caps.
3. Players that hold a club record or have captained the club.

- (England) Billy Biggar
- (England) Stan Burton
- (England) Steve Griffiths
- (England) George Tepper
- (England) Frank Westlake
