= Arthur Goodyer =

English footballer

Personal information
- Full name: Arthur Copeland Goodyer
- Date of birth: 1854
- Place of birth: Stamford, England
- Date of death: 8 January 1932 (aged 78–79)
- Position: Winger

Senior career*
Years	Team	Apps	(Gls)
- Nottingham Forest

International career
1879	England	1	(0)
- * Club domestic league appearances and goals

Arthur Copeland Goodyer (1854 – 8 January 1932) was an English international footballer, who played as a winger.

== Career ==
Born in Stamford, Goodyer played for Nottingham Forest from February 1876 to March 1880. He earned one cap for England on 5 April 1879 in a friendly against Scotland. England won the game 5–4.

In 1883, he married Elizabeth Angrave and in 1888 they emigrated to the US. He remained there until his death in 1932 as the result of a car accident.
