= Harry Woolhouse =

English footballer

Personal information
- Full name: Henry Woolhouse
- Date of birth: 1867
- Place of birth: Ecclesfield, England
- Date of death: 1911 (aged 43–44)
- Position: Inside forward

Senior career*
| Years | Team | Apps | (Gls) |
| 1891–1892 | Sheffield | | |
| 1892–1895 | The Wednesday | 16 | (10) |
| Total | | 16 | (10) |
- * Club domestic league appearances and goals

Henry Woolhouse (1867–1911) was an English footballer who played in the Football League for The Wednesday.
