= High Green =

Suburb of Sheffield, South Yorkshire, England

Coordinates: 53.473°N 1.494°W

High Green near Barnsley
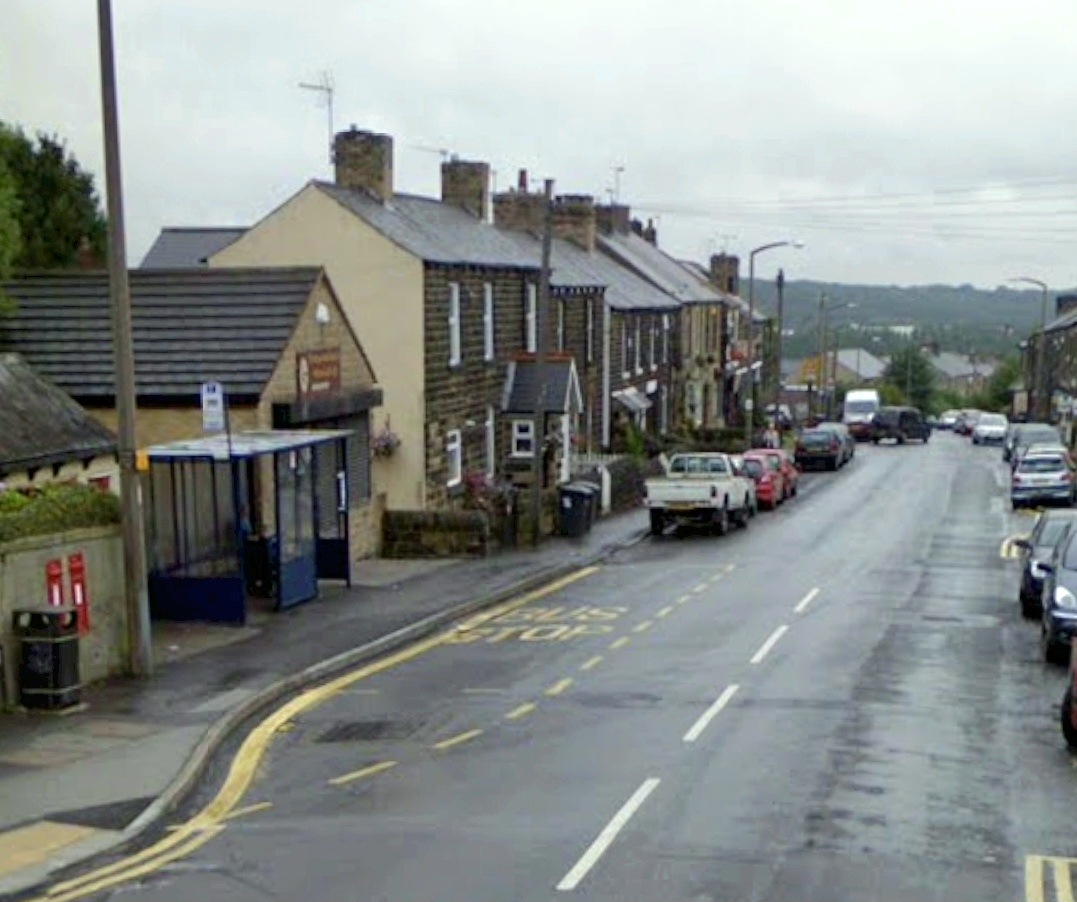
- Wortley Road, High Green

- Location within Sheffield
- Civil parish: Ecclesfield
- Metropolitan borough: City of Sheffield
- Metropolitan county: South Yorkshire
- Region: Yorkshire and the Humber
- Country: England
- Sovereign state: United Kingdom
- Post town: SHEFFIELD
- Postcode district: S35
- Dialling code: 0114
- Police: South Yorkshire
- Fire: South Yorkshire
- Ambulance: Yorkshire
- UK Parliament: Penistone and Stocksbridge

High Green is a village within the boundaries of the City of Sheffield, situated approximately 6 miles from Barnsley, the nearest major town. It is the most northerly suburb of Sheffield, located to the north of Chapeltown. It is served by bus services (1 to Batemoor and 75 to Jordanthorpe); the nearest railway station is in Chapeltown, 1 mile away. The suburb falls within the West Ecclesfield ward of the city council.

Wharncliffe Crags are nearby, as is Westwood Country Park.

Until April 1974, High Green was part of the Wortley Rural District, in the West Riding of Yorkshire.

High Green has five primary schools: four mainstream schools (Angram Bank Primary, High Green Primary, Greengate Lane Primary, and St. Mary's Primary) and one non-maintained special school, Paces School (formerly High Green Secondary) serving both primary and secondary age children. High Green does not have a mainstream secondary school. Pupils typically attend Ecclesfield School, located approximately 2 miles away in the Ecclesfield area. Other secondary schools in the vicinity include Stocksbridge or Notre Dame.

The Catholic Church in High Green is dedicated to St. Mary.
