= Alexander Wallace (botanist) =

English physician, botanist, and entomologis

Alexander Wallace (1829 – 7 October 1899) was an English physician, botanist, and entomologist.

Born in London, Wallace earned at Trinity College, Oxford an MA in 1858 and an MD in 1861. He played first-class cricket there for the university club.

He commenced practice in London, and was physician to the Middlesex Free Hospital. Afterwards he removed to Colchester, and for some years held an official appointment there, which he gave up, and started bulb growing (especially Japanese Lilies), and his sons have a very large and prosperous business of this nature at Colchester; he resumed his medical practice in the same town.

He worked as an agent for new introductions of lilies and orchids. His company "The New Plant and Bulb Company" supplied lilies to Gertrude Jekyll.

The second edition of his book Notes on lilies and their culture was published in 1879 after a first edition in 1873. For two of his essays he won prizes from the Entomological Society of London in 1865–1866 and was a member of several learned societies.
