= Attercliffe F.C. =

Attercliffe
- Full name: Attercliffe Football Club
- Nickname: the Attercliffeites
- Founded: 1870
- Dissolved: 1903?
- Ground: Pheasant Inn Athletic Grounds
1870–78 colours	from 1891 colours

Attercliffe Football Club was an English association football club based in Attercliffe, Sheffield, South Yorkshire.

== History ==
=== Sheffield Rules days ===
Attercliffe was formed as Christchurch in 1870 out of a cricket club dating back to at least 1862, and changed its name to Attercliffe in 1873. In common with most of the clubs in the area, the club played under the Sheffield rules of the game until the Sheffield Association's merger with the Football Association in 1877.

The club's first match was at home to The Wednesday on 30 November 1870, the club being described as "most promising", with "several noted University players" in its ranks and |proving themselves resolute and scientific". As the rules at the time did not stipulate a maximum number of players, the clubs agreed that the match should be 13 per side; despite the praise for the "A.C.C.F.C.", the visitors won 2–0. The club included a doctor, a vicar, and captain Bernard Shaw, a surgeon, suggesting it drew its members from the middle classes; Shaw however died before the end of the season, aged just 24.

The club may have been part of the earliest use of a substitute in football; the club visited Derby St Andrews for a friendly in December 1872, and, after 45 minutes, a Mr Abney, one of the Derby members, turned up, having been delayed, and entered the pitch with one of the Derby players leaving it; "upon the umpire demanding how it was that an extra man had come in, he was informed that it was an arrangement between the two captains".

The club was prominent in Sheffield football during the 19th century, and entered the first Sheffield Challenge Cup in 1876–77. Attercliffe reached the quarter-finals in the first year and the final in 1877–78, losing to The Wednesday at Bramall Lane in the latter year, in front of 4,000 spectators; the atmosphere of the match was subdued as most of the crowd considered Attercliffe to have no real chance of winning, as Wednesday had not conceded a goal in the entire competition. The Attercliffe club had the consolation of receiving new jerseys as runner-up prizes from the Sheffield Association president. From 1871 to 1884 the club regularly hosted The Wednesday in the opening fixture of the season.

=== Stepping up to senior football ===
The Attercliffe Football Club in 1889, showing off some local trophies.

Attercliffe won the Sheffield Association Minor Cup for three seasons in a row, from 1883–84 to 1886–87, its hardest triumph being a 1–0 win over Eckington Works in the 1886 final at the Newhall Grounds, the only goal of the game coming in the 20 minute extra time period as Attercliffe scrimmaged the ball into the goal. Off the back of that run, Attercliffe made its FA Cup debut in 1886–87, losing 7–0 at Staveley in the first round, the seventh goal being an overhead kick from Hay. The following season the club fared even worse, being drawn away at Heeley, the tie taking place at the same time as a Sunday School Cup tie which was occupying most of the first team; the Attercliffe side was mostly reserves, plus three Attercliffe members who had turned up to watch. In the circumstances the 9–0 defeat was not surprising; the previous week, with both clubs playing their first teams, Attercliffe had won 4–3.

=== Local leagues ===
The arrival of professionalism in the game proved the undoing of the club. Wednesday was the only Sheffield club to turn professional; the new Sheffield United club joined it in 1889. Attercliffe therefore resolved to turn professional for the 1889–90 season, but, with two Sheffield clubs now part of national leagues, the smaller clubs were squeezed out. Attercliffe was one of the founder members of the Sheffield & District Football League in 1889–90, finishing third in 1892–93, just 2 points behind champions Wednesday Wanderers, but the following season only 5 clubs took part. The club did however play in the replacement Sheffield Association League until 1901–02.

The club continued to enter the FA Cup qualifying rounds until 1903, only getting past the first qualifying round on four occasions, and two of those were due to byes; the club's first win in the competition did not arrive until 1897–98, beating Wombwell Town after another first round bye. The club seems to have disbanded after a preliminary round defeat to Mexborough West End in 1903.

A revival of the club, still playing at the Pheasant Inn, lasted from 1923 to 1927.

== Colours ==
The club originally played in blue and white, probably in hoops as that was the dominant design at the time. From 1878 the club played in blue and black. By the late 1880s the club was wearing blue and white stripes, and by 1891 white shirts.

== Ground ==
The club's earliest named ground was on Shirland Lane, near Attercliffe Station, in 1872. In 1878 the club moved to a ground at Brightside Lane. By 1886 the club had moved to the Newhall Grounds and in 1887 the club was playing at the Old Forge Ground.

From the 1890–91 season the club played at the Holmes, also known as the Carbrook cricket ground, on the Swallow Estate. In September 1899, with the ground being taken over for housing, the club moved to a new ground behind the Pheasant Inn, thanks to the landlord - William Salt - having become involved with the club and having built an athletics stadium behind the inn. One alternative possibility for the Carbrook ground was for The Wednesday to take it over, and the club members voted in favour of buying it in 1899, but, as terms could not be agreed, the club bought a site at Hillsborough instead.

== Records ==
- Best FA Cup performance: 1st Round, 1886–87, 1887–88
- Best Sheffield Senior Cup performance: runners-up, 1877–78

== Notable figures ==
- Tom Crawshaw, who played for the club before joining The Wednesday in 1894, and later playing for the England national football team
- Alexander Wallace and John Webster, who played for the club in the 1890s and joined Football League clubs
- John Nicholson, club secretary, who became secretary-manager for Sheffield United in 1899
- George Jepson, goalkeeper in the late 1890s, who was recommended for a Royal Humane Society award for saving the lives of an actor and stagehand, after a publicity stunt for the play A Dark Secret went wrong. The play included a water-tank, and the cast re-created the relevant scene at a Sheffield canal, but a boat carrying them capsized; the stagehand could not swim and the actor was trapped underwater by the boat's equipment. Jepson, noted as an excellent swimmer, went in and pulled them both to safety. The play was a sell-out.
