= Sheffield & Hallamshire Senior Cup =

- Sheffield & Hallamshire Senior Cup.
- Organiser(s): Sheffield & Hallamshire County FA
- Founded: 1876; 150 years ago
- Current champions: Worksop Town (16th title)
- Most championships: Worksop Town (16 titles)
- Website: Sheffield & Hallamshire FA

The Sheffield & Hallamshire Senior Cup is a county cup competition involving teams within the Sheffield and Hallamshire County Football Association. Originally named the Sheffield Challenge Cup, it is the 5th oldest surviving cup competition in the world, after the FA Cup (1871–72), the Scottish FA Cup (1873–74), the East of Scotland Shield (1875–76) and the Birmingham Senior Cup (1876–77). (Note: The first Birmingham Senior Cup tie was on 14 October 1876; the first Sheffield Senior Cup tie two weeks later.)

Sheffield and Hallamshire County Football Association members at levels 5–11 of the English football league system are currently eligible to compete in the competition.

== History ==
The inaugural tournament was won by The Wednesday, who defeated Heeley 4–3 in the 1876–77 final. From 1893–94 to 1895–96, the competition was played in a league format. From 1925–26 to 1945–46 the competition was split into two, with the Sheffield & Hallamshire Invitation Cup acting as the more senior competition. The current champions are Worksop Town, who won their record 16th title after defeating Worsbrough Bridge Athletic F.C. 2–1 in the 2025–26 final.

Worksop Town are record holders for the most titles won.

== Finals ==
This section lists every final of the competition played since 1876, the winners, the runners-up, and the result.

=== Key ===
Match went to a replay
Match went to extra time
Match decided by a penalty shootout after extra time
Shared trophy

Season	Winners	Result	Runner-up	Venue	Att.	Notes
1876–77	The Wednesday	4–3	Heeley	Bramall Lane	8,000	
1877–78	The Wednesday	2–0	Attercliffe	Bramall Lane	7,000	
1878–79	Thursday Wanderers	3–1	Heeley	Bramall Lane	5,000	
1879–80	Staveley	3–1	Heeley	Sheaf House		
1880–81	The Wednesday	8–1	Ecclesfield	Bramall Lane	3,000	
1881–82	Heeley	5–0	Pyebank	Bramall Lane	4,000	
1882–83	The Wednesday	2–1	Lockwood Brothers	Bramall Lane	4,000	Replayed final
1883–84	Lockwood Brothers	-	Middlesbrough	-		Three semi-finals determined winner and runner-up
1884–85	Lockwood Brothers	-	Park Grange	-		Three semi-finals determined winner and runner-up
1885–86	Mexborough	2–1	Heeley	Old Forge Ground	2,000	
1886–87	The Wednesday	2–1	Collegiate	Bramall Lane		
1887–88	The Wednesday	3–2	Ecclesfield	Bramall Lane	4,000	
1888–89	Rotherham Town	2–1	Staveley	Bramall Lane		
1889–90	Rotherham Town	1–0	Sheffield United	Rotherham		
1890–91	Doncaster Rovers	2–1	Sheffield United	Bramall Lane		
1891–92	Sheffield United	2–1	The Wednesday reserves	Bramall Lane	5,000	
1892–93	Sheffield United reserves	3–1	The Wednesday reserves	Bramall Lane	4,500	
1893–94	Mexborough	-	Sheffield United reserves	-		League format
1894–95	The Wednesday reserves	-	Sheffield United reserves	-		League format
1895–96	Mexborough	-	Sheffield United reserves	-		League format
1896–97	Sheffield United reserves	3–0	Wath	Olive Grove		
1897–98	Sheffield United reserves	3–1	The Wednesday reserves	Bramall Lane	2,000	
1898–99	Sheffield United reserves	5–2	Attercliffe	Bramall Lane		Replayed final
1899–1900	The Wednesday reserves	2–0	Worksop Town	Carbrook		
1900–01	Sheffield United reserves	6–1	Channing Rovers	Bramall Lane		
1901–02	The Wednesday reserves	1–0	Royston United	Millmoor	3,000	
1902–03	The Wednesday reserves	5–0	Roundel	Bramall Lane	10,000	Replayed final
1903–04	Barnsley reserves	6–1	Hallam	Bramall Lane		
1904–05	Sheffield United reserves	3–1	The Wednesday reserves	Hillsborough	6,000	
1905–06	Denaby United	4–2	The Wednesday reserves	Clifton Lane	7,000	
1906–07	The Wednesday reserves	2–0	Sheffield United reserves	Bramall Lane	4,000	Replayed final
1907–08	Sheffield United reserves	1–0	South Kirkby Colliery	Hillsborough		
1908–09	Sheffield United reserves	5–1	Rotherham County	Bramall Lane	3,384	Replayed final
1909–10	Denaby United	-	Barnsley reserves	-		Awarded to Denaby United
1910–11	Sheffield United reserves	4–1	Mexborough Town	Clifton Lane		
1911–12	Doncaster Rovers	3–0	Sheffield United reserves	Wath		
1912–13	Rotherham County	3–0	Worksop Town	Bramall Lane		
1913–14	Rotherham County	1–0	The Wednesday reserves	Bramall Lane	8,000	
1914–15	Barnsley reserves	3–0	Worksop Town	Bramall Lane		
1919–20	Rotherham Town	1–0	Sheffield United reserves	Clifton Lane		
1920–21	The Wednesday reserves	2–0	Barnsley reserves	Bramall Lane	8,000	
1921–22	The Wednesday reserves	2–0	Barnsley reserves	Bramall Lane		
1922–23	Wombwell	2–0	Mexborough Town	Wath		Replayed final
1923–24	Worksop Town	3–0	Barnsley reserves	Bramall Lane		
1924–25	Rotherham Town	5–1	Worksop Town	Bramall Lane		
1925–26	Wath Athletic	4–0	Hemsworth West End	Tickhill Square		
1926–27	Darfield	5–2	Ecclesfield United	Birdwell		
1927–28	Frickley Colliery	3–1	Ardsley Athletic	Hampden Road		
1928–29	Ardsley Athletic	6–2	Ecclesfield United	Birdwell		
1929–30	South Kirkby Colliery	2–0	Cudworth Village	Cemetery Road		Replayed final
1930–31	Mexborough Athletic	2–0	Frickley Colliery	Hampden Road		
1931–32	Dinnington Athletic	3–0	South Kirkby Colliery	Hampden Road		
1932–33	Denaby United	1–0	Rawmarsh Welfare	Hampden Road		Replayed final
1933–34	Mexborough Athletic	8–1	Woodhouse Alliance	Tickhill Square		
1934–35	Firbeck Main Colliery	3–0	Denaby United	Dinnington		
1935–36	Denaby United	4–2	Worksop Town	Central Avenue		
1936–37	Upton Colliery	4–3	Thurnscoe Victoria	Hampden Road		
1937–38	Norton Woodseats	2–1	Lopham Street UM	Hillsborough		
1938–39	Rawmarsh Welfare	3–2	Worksop Town	Beighton		
1939–40	Beighton Miners Welfare	2–1	Frickley Colliery Athletic	Belle Vue		Replayed final
1940–41	South Kirkby Colliery	2–1	Beighton Miners Welfare	Millmoor		Replayed final
1941–42	Manvers Main	1–0	Sheffield United reserves	Bramall Lane		
1942–43	Royal Army Service Corps	1–0	Sheffield Wednesday reserves	Bramall Lane		Replayed final
1943–44	Royal Army Service Corps	5–3	Norton Woodseats	Millmoor		
1944–45	Barnsley reserves	3–1	Brodsworth Welfare	Oakwell		
1945–46	Wombwell Athletic	2–0	Harworth Colliery	Wath		
1946–47	Thurcroft Main	W – L	Dinnington Athletic			
1947–48	Harworth Colliery	1–0	Beighton Miners Welfare	Central Avenue		
1948–49	Royston Social	3–2	Harworth Colliery	Central Avenue		
1949–50	Upton Colliery	5–3	Beighton Miners Welfare	Tickhill Square		
1950–51	Hallam	3–0	Stocksbridge Works	Hillsborough	7,240	
1951–52	Stocksbridge Works	4–1	Denaby United	Hillsborough		
1952–53	Worksop Town	3–1	Beighton Miners Welfare	Hillsborough		
1953–54	Sheffield Wednesday 'A'	2–1	Worksop Town	Central Avenue		
1954–55	Worksop Town	2–1	Stocksbridge Works	Central Avenue		
1955–56	Beighton Miners Welfare	4–2	Stocksbridge Works	Thorncliffe		
1956–57	Frickley Colliery	3–2	Worksop Town	Westfield Lane		
1957–58	Bentley Colliery	3–1	Stocksbridge Works	Oakwell		
1958–59	Bentley Colliery	1–0	Yotar Sports	Tickhill Square		
1959–60	Grimethorpe Miners Welfare	3–2	Denaby United	Grimethorpe		
1960–61	Frickley Colliery	2–0	Worksop Town	Westfield Lane		Replayed final
1961–62	Hallam	1–0	Sheffield	High Green		Replayed final
1962–63	Frickley Colliery	2–1	Sheffield United 'A'	Hampden Road		
1963–64	Mexborough Town	-	Stocksbridge Works	-		Awarded to Mexborough Town
1964–65	Hallam	3–2	Thurcroft Welfare	Millmoor		
1965–66	Worksop Town	3–2	Frickley Colliery	Westfield Lane		
1966–67	Frickley Colliery	4–1	Norton Woodseats	Coach & Horses Ground		
1967–68	Hallam	1–0	Norton Woodseats	Hillsborough		
1968–69	Redfearn Sports	1–0	Frickley Colliery	Tickhill Square		
1969–70	Worksop Town	2–1	Dinnington Athletic	Hard Lane		
1970–71	Rawmarsh Welfare	3–1	Frickley Colliery	Dale Road		
1971–72	Kiveton Park	3–0	Frecheville Community Association	Swallownest		
1972–73	Worksop Town	4–1	Worsbrough Bridge Miners Welfare	Millmoor		
1973–74	Frecheville Community Association	2–1	Worksop Town	Hard Lane		Replayed final
1974–75	Mexborough Town Athletic	1–0	Denaby United	Tickhill Square		
1975–76	Emley	2–0	Worksop Town	Hillsborough		
1976–77	Mexborough Town Athletic	2–1	Worksop Town	Bramall Lane		
1977–78	Maltby Miners Welfare	2–1	Mexborough Town Athletic	Belle Vue		
1978–79	Frickley Athletic	3–2	Mexborough Town Athletic	Hampden Road		
1979–80	Emley	2–0	Worksop Town	Oakwell		
1980–81	Emley	2–1	Frickley Athletic	Woolley Colliery Road		
1981–82	Worksop Town	-	Frickley Athletic	-		Awarded to Worksop Town
1982–83	Mexborough Town Athletic	3–1	Denaby United	Millmoor		
1983–84	Emley	2–0	Frecheville Community Association	Oakwell		
1984–85	Worksop Town	2–1	Frickley Athletic	Millmoor		
1985–86	Frickley Athletic	2–0	Crookes	Central Avenue		
1986–87	Denaby United	3–2	Emley	Oakwell		
1987–88	Frickley Athletic	2–1 (agg)	Worksop Town			Played over two legs
1988–89	Emley	2–0	Woolley Miners Welfare	Oakwell		
1989–90	Frickley Athletic	2–1 (agg)	Denaby United			Played over two legs
1990–91	Emley	1–1	Worksop Town	Hillsborough		Emley won on penalties
1991–92	Emley	1–0	Frickley Athletic	Bracken Moor	1,300	
1992–93	Stocksbridge Park Steels	5–3 (agg)	Worksop Town			Played over two legs
1993–94	Sheffield	1–1	Worksop Town	Hillsborough	698	Sheffield won on penalties
1994–95	Worksop Town	1–0	Emley	Hillsborough	750	
1995–96	Stocksbridge Park Steels	1–0	Grimethorpe Miners Welfare	Welfare Ground		
1996–97	Worksop Town	7–0	Harworth Colliery Institute	Hillsborough	700	
1997–98	Emley	3–0	Parkgate	Hillsborough	1,200	
1998–99	Stocksbridge Park Steels	1–0	Emley	Hillsborough	2,000	
1999–2000	Frickley Athletic	3–0	Emley	Hillsborough		
2000–01	Doncaster Rovers	2–1	Emley	Hillsborough	1,486	
2001–02	Doncaster Rovers	3–0	Emley	Hillsborough	973	
2002–03	Worksop Town	2–1	Doncaster Rovers	Hillsborough	813	
2003–04	Frickley Athletic	3–2	Worksop Town	Hillsborough	882	
2004–05	Sheffield	1–0	Worksop Town	Hillsborough	821	
2005–06	Sheffield	2–1	Parkgate	Hillsborough	666	
2006–07	Stocksbridge Park Steels	2–1	Worksop Town	Hillsborough	446	
2007–08	Sheffield	2–0	Worksop Town	Hillsborough	583	
2008–09	Stocksbridge Park Steels	3–0	Brodsworth Welfare	Hillsborough	338	
2009–10	Sheffield	4–2	Hallam	Hillsborough	546	
2010–11	Stocksbridge Park Steels	3–0	Parkgate	Hillsborough	440	
2011–12	Worksop Town	3–2	Frickley Athletic	Hillsborough	850	
2012–13	Frickley Athletic	4–3	Sheffield	Hillsborough	487	
2013–14	Athersley Recreation	1–0	Frickley Athletic	Hillsborough	607	
2014–15	Frickley Athletic	4–1	Nostell Miners Welfare	New York Stadium	465	
2015–16	Frickley Athletic		Shaw Lane Aquaforce		–	Awarded to Frickley Athletic
2016–17	Shaw Lane	1–0	Frickley Athletic	Bramall Lane	451	
2017–18	Shaw Lane	4–3	Penistone Church	Bramall Lane	671	
2018–19	North Gawber Colliery		Frickley Athletic		–	Awarded to North Gawber Colliery
2021–22	Worksop Town	3–0	Maltby Main	Eco-Power Stadium	1,044	
2022–23	Emley	2–0	Maltby Main	Eco-Power Stadium	640	
2023–24	Worksop Town	5–0	Penistone Church	Hillsborough	1,500	
2024–25	Worksop Town	2–1	Hallam	Hillsborough	2,614	
2025–26	Worksop Town	2–1	Worsbrough Bridge Athletic	Eco-Power Stadium	710	

=== Wins by teams ===
Club	Wins	First final won	Last final won	Runner-up	Last final lost	Total final apps.	Notes
Worksop Town	16	1923–24	2025–26	21	2007–08	37	
Frickley Athletic	14	1927–28	2015–16	12	2018–19	26	(Note: Won 5 titles as Frickley Colliery.)
Sheffield Wednesday	14	1876–77	1953–54	6	1942–43	20	(Note: Won 6 titles as The Wednesday, 7 titles as The Wednesday reserves, 1 Sheffield Wednesday 'A'.)
Sheffield United	10	1891–92	1910–11	9	1962–63	19	(Note: Won 9 titles as Sheffield United reserves.)
Emley	9	1975–76	2022–23	6	2001–02	15	(Note: All honours and history of Emley FC/Wakefield FC given to Emley AFC in 2022)
Stocksbridge Park Steels	6	1992–93	2010–11	0	–	6	
Denaby United †	5	1905–06	1986–87	6	1989–90	11	(Note: Dissolved in 2002.)
Sheffield	5	1993–94	2009–10	2	2012–13	7	
Mexborough Town †	4	1963–64	1982–83	4	1978–79	8	(Note: Dissolved in 1993. Won 3 titles as Mexborough Town Athletic.)
Hallam	4	1950–51	1967–68	3	2024–25	7	
Doncaster Rovers	4	1890–91	2001–02	1	2002–03	5	
Barnsley	3	1903–04	1944–45	4	1923–24	7	(Note: Won 3 titles as Barnsley reserves.)
Beighton Miners Welfare †	2	1939–40	1955–56	4	1952–53	6	(Note: Dissolved in 1960.)
South Kirkby Colliery	2	1929–30	1940–41	2	1931–32	4	
Mexborough Athletic †	2	1930–31	1933–34	0	–	2	(Note: Dissolved in 1936.)
Lockwood Brothers †	2	1883–84	1884–85	1	1882–83	3	(Note: Dissolved in 1893.)
Rawmarsh Welfare †	2	1938–39	1970–71	1	1932–33	3	(Note: Dissolved in 1982.)
Rotherham County †	2	1912–13	1913–14	1	1908–09	3	(Note: Dissolved in 1925.)
Bentley Colliery †	2	1957–58	1958–59	0	–	2	(Note: Dissolved in 1961 and again in 2016.)
Mexborough ††	2	1885–86	1895–96	0	–	2	(Note: Dissolved in 1900.)
Rotherham Town (1899) †	2	1919–20	1924–25	0	–	2	(Note: Dissolved in 1925.)
Rotherham Town (1878) †	2	1888–89	1889–90	0	–	2	(Note: Dissolved in 1896.)
Royal Army Service Corps	2	1942–43	1943–44	0	–	2	
Shaw Lane †	2	2016–17	2017–18	0	–	2	(Note: Dissolved in 2018.)
Upton Colliery †	2	1936–37	1949–50	0	–	2	(Note: Dissolved in 1964.)
Stocksbridge Works †	1	1951–52	1951–52	0	–	1	(Note: Dissolved in 1986.)
Heeley †	1	1881–82	1881–82	4	1885–86	5	(Note: Dissolved in 1899.)
Norton Woodseats †	1	1937–38	1937–38	3	1967–68	4	(Note: Dissolved in 1999.)
Frecheville Community Association †	1	1973–74	1973–74	2	1983–84	3	(Note: Dissolved in 2020.)
Harworth Colliery	1	1947–48	1947–48	2	1996–97	3	
Ardsley Athletic †	1	1928–29	1928–29	1	1927–28	2	(Note: Dissolved in 1936.)
Grimethorpe Miners Welfare †	1	1959–60	1959–60	1	1995–96	2	(Note: Dissolved in 1991 & again in 2002.)
Staveley †	1	1879–80	1879–80	1	1888–89	2	(Note: Dissolved in 1892.)
Athersley Recreation	1	2013–14	2013–14	0	–	1	
Darfield †	1	1926–27	1926–27	0	–	1	(Note: Dissolved in 1932.)
Firbeck Main Colliery †	1	1934–35	1934–35	0	–	1	(Note: Dissolved in 1968.)
Kiveton Park	1	1971–72	1971–72	0	–	1	
Maltby Miners Welfare	1	1977–78	1977–78	0	–	1	
Manvers Main †	1	1941–42	1941–42	0	–	1	(Note: Dissolved in 1988.)
North Gawber Colliery †	1	2018–19	2018–19	0	–	1	(Note: Dissolved in 1987.)
Redfearn Sports †	1	1968–69	1968–69	0	–	1	(Note: Dissolved in 1992.)
Royston Social †	1	1948–49	1948–49	0	–	1	(Note: Dissolved in 1989.)
Thurcroft Main †	1	1946–47	1946–47	0	–	1	(Note: Dissolved in 1991.)
Thursday Wanderers †	1	1878–79	1878–79	0	–	1	(Note: Dissolved in mid-20th century.)
Wath Athletic †	1	1925–26	1925–26	0	–	1	(Note: Dissolved in 1934.)
Wombwell †	1	1922–23	1922–23	0	–	1	(Note: Dissolved in 1934.)
Wombwell Athletic †	1	1945–46	1945–46	0	–	1	(Note: Dissolved in 2000.)

== Invitation Cup ==
Sheffield & Hallamshire Senior Cup
- Founded: 1925
- Abolished: 1946
- Most championships: Sheffield Wednesday reserves (5 titles)

The county FA ran a second Senior Cup competition from 1925/26 to 1945/46, the Sheffield & Hallamshire Invitation Cup.

The competition was open to the more senior non-league clubs in the region as well as the reserve teams of the area's professional (Barnsley, Doncaster Rovers, Rotherham United, Sheffield United and Sheffield Wednesday).

=== Finals ===
Season	Winner	Score	Runner-up	Venue	Notes
1925–26	The Wednesday reserves	4–2	Doncaster Rovers reserves	Bramall Lane	
1926–27	Sheffield United reserves	2–1	The Wednesday reserves	Bramall Lane	
1927–28	The Wednesday reserves	4–0	Worksop Town	Bramall Lane	
1928–29	The Wednesday reserves	4–1	Sheffield United reserves	Bramall Lane	
1929–30	Barnsley reserves	1–0	Sheffield United reserves		
1930–31	Sheffield Wednesday reserves	3–1	Sheffield United reserves	Hillsborough	
1931–32	Sheffield Wednesday reserves	3–1	Wombwell	Bramall Lane	
1932–33	Barnsley reserves	4–1	Doncaster Rovers reserves	Oakwell	
1933–34	Barnsley reserves	8–0	Sheffield Wednesday reserves	Oakwell	
1934–35					Not played
1935–36					Not played
1936–37	Doncaster Rovers reserves	3–1	Barnsley reserves		
1937–38	Doncaster Rovers reserves	1–0	Rotherham United reserves		
1938–39	Doncaster Rovers reserves	1–0	Barnsley reserves		
1939–40	Bolsover Colliery	3–2	Beighton Miners Welfare	Bramall Lane	
1940–41	Thurcroft Main	2–0	Denaby United		
1941–42	Royal Army Service Corps				
1942–43					Not played
1943–44	Royal Army Service Corps		Sheffield United reserves		
1944–45	Firbeck Main	3–2	Sheffield Wednesday reserves	Hillsborough	
1945–46	Thurnscoe Victoria	5–3	Kiveton Park	Central Avenue	League format – play-off final

==== Winners ====
- 5 wins – Sheffield Wednesday reserves
- 3 wins – Barnsley reserves, Doncaster Rovers reserves
- 2 wins – Royal Army Service Corps
- 1 win – Sheffield United reserves, Bolsover Colliery, Thurcroft Main, Firbeck Main, Thurnscoe Victoria

== See also ==
- Sheffield & Hallamshire County Cup
- Sheffield & Hallamshire County Senior League
- Wharncliffe Charity Cup
