= Mexborough F.C. =

Mexborough
- Full name: Mexborough Football Club
- Founded: 1876; 149 years ago
- Dissolved: 1900; 125 years ago
- Ground: Recreation Ground
Home colours

Mexborough F.C. was an English association football club based in Mexborough, Doncaster, South Yorkshire. The club's name was often given in the form Mexbro' or Mexboro.

== History ==
The club was formed in 1876. The club won the prestigious Sheffield Senior Cup for the first time in 1885–86 when beating Heeley at Bramall Lane. The same season the club entered the FA Cup for the first time, drawing 1–1 with Staveley F.C. at the neutral Kilnshurst Ground in the first round. However Mexbro' was forced to scratch from the replay as the Sheffield Senior Cup tie with Owlerton F.C. took precedence and the Sheffield FA refused to grant an extension of time to play the Owlerton tie.

The club remained amateur in a professional era, the players – all locals – being paid expenses or "beer money", although many of the team were Methodist teetotallers. In 1891 they were founder members of the Sheffield & District League. In 1893 they finished as league runners-up, and a year later they went one better, beating Sheffield Wednesday reserves in the league's play-off final. During the same season they also won the Sheffield Challenge Cup League.

In 1896 they won the Wharncliffe Charity Cup League, and the following season they entered the Midland League, finishing 13th in their first season. The 1897–98 campaign was the most successful in the club's history, winning the Midland League title as well as finishing runners-up in the Yorkshire League and reaching the 5th qualifying round of the FA Cup (the final stage before the competition proper), where the club lost 1–0 at home, in front of a crowd of 3,500, to Gainsborough Trinity; the visitors winning thanks to a first-half "flaky" shot, although Boro goalkeeper Hardy later saved a penalty.

They decided to revert to more local football in 1899, joining the Sheffield Association League, but the fans' interest wained and the club seems to have wound up for financial reasons at the conclusion of the 1899–1900 season.

=== League and cup history ===
Mexborough League and Cup history
Season	Division	Position	FA Cup
1885–86	-	-	1st Round
1891–92	Sheffield & District League	/10	-
1893–93	Sheffield & District League	2nd/14	-
1893–94	Sheffield & District League Division 2 Sheffield Challenge Cup League	1st/5* 1st/14	2nd qualifying round
1894–95	Wharncliffe Charity Cup League	1st/6	3rd qualifying round
1895–96	Sheffield Challenge Cup League	1st/15	1st qualifying round
1896–97	Midland League	13th/15	1st qualifying round
1897–98	Midland League; Yorkshire League	1st/12 2nd/10	5th qualifying round
1898–99	Midland League; Yorkshire League	14th/14 4th/10	3rd qualifying round
1899–1900	Sheffield Association League Division 1	5th/9	2nd qualifying round

* League play-off winners

== Colours ==
The club's colours were originally red and white, with striped jerseys identical to Lincoln City's. By 1890 the club had changed to blue and red jerseys.

== Honours ==
=== League ===
- Midland League
  - Champions: 1897–98
- Yorkshire League
  - Runners-up: 1897–98
- Sheffield Challenge Cup League
  - Champions: 1893–94
- Sheffield & District League
  - Champions: 1893–94
- Wharncliffe Charity Cup League
  - Champions: 1894–95

=== Cup ===
- Sheffield Senior Cup
  - Winners: 1885–86, 1895–96

== Notable player ==
- George Wilson — FA Cup winner with Blackburn Olympic in 1883
