= Sheffield & Hallamshire Saturday Trophy =

- Founded: 1909
- Current champions: Grange Moor Saints (2024–25)
- Most championships: Tinsley Park Sports, Athersley Recreation (5 titles)

The Sheffield & Hallamshire Saturday Trophy is a county cup competition involving teams within the Sheffield & Hallamshire County Football Association (S&HCFA).

Inaugurated as the Sheffield & Hallamshire Junior Cup in 1909, it is generally open to S&HCFA teams at levels 15 and below of the English football league system, although reserve teams at levels 13 and 14 also compete. Saturday clubs from outside the system also enter. The competition was renamed as the Saturday Cup in 2023.

It is the third most important S&HCFA county cup, behind the Senior Cup and Association Cup.

== Finals ==
Season	Winner	Result	Runner-up	Venue	Notes
1909–10	Penistone Church	4–0	Meadow Hall		
1910–11	Handsworth Rovers	5–0	Stocksbridge Foresters		
1911–12	Eckington Red Rose	1–0	Grenoside Bible Class	Woodhouse	
1912–13	Valley Road Mission	4–2	Bird-in-Hand	Ball Inn	
1913–14	Valley Road Bible Class	4–1	Treeton Reading Room		
1914–15	Nether Edge Amateurs	1–0	Darnall Congregationalists	Sandygate	
1918–19	Kimberworth Old Boys	3–1	Staveley West End	Bramall Lane	
1919–20	Oughtibridge	5–1	Sheffield United reserves	Bramall Lane	
1920–21	Grenoside	2–0	Bird-in-Hand	Hillsborough	
1921–22	Grenoside	3–1	Greasbrough Working Men's Club	Hillsborough	
1922–23	Nether Edge Amateurs	3–2	King's Head	Carbrook	
1923–24	Attercliffe Victory	3–1	Howells Sports		
1924–25	Malin Bridge Old Boys	2–0	Shiregreen		
1925–26	Park Labour	3–2	Stocksbridge Church	Bramall Lane	
1926–27	Lopham Street United Methodists	2–0	Hathersage		
1927–28	Turton Platts	3–2	Hathersage		
1928–29	Lopham Street United Methodists	3–0	Woodhouse Working Men's Club	Handsworth	
1929–30	Tinsley Park Sports	3–1	Woodhouse Working Men's Club	Bramall Lane	
1930–31	Tinsley Park Sports	2–1	Penistone Church	Bramall Lane	
1931–32	Tinsley Park Sports	1–0	Rawmarsh Welfare	Templeborough	
1932–33	Tinsley Park Sports	3–2	Fulwood		
1933–34	Lopham Street United Methodists reserves	1–0	Tinsley Park Sports	Shiregreen	
1934–35	Tinsley Park Sports	6–2	Catcliffe Juniors	Shiregreen	
1935–36	Fulwood	3–2	Pitsmoor Working Men's Club	Shiregreen	
1936–37	Penistone Church	2–1	Treeton Reading Room	Shiregreen	
1937–38	Stovin Athletic	1–0	Ecclesfield Red Rose	Shiregreen	
1938–39	City Surveyors	2–1	Stocksbridge Works	Oughtibridge	
1939–40	Hoyland Law	3–1	Davy		
1940–41	Grimethorpe Rovers	4–0	Attercliffe Radicals	Millmoor	
1941–42	Attercliffe Radicals	4–3	Thorncliffe Welfare		
1942–43	Attercliffe Radicals	6–1	Swallownest		
1943–44	Thorncliffe Welfare	4–2	Atlas & Norfolk Works	Hillsborough	
1944–45	Heeley Social	3–2	Atlas & Norfolk Works		
1945–46	Hoyland Common Health & Strength	3–1	Atlas & Norfolk Works		
1946–47	Hoyland Common Athletic	4–2	Hamptons Sports		
1947–48	Woodhouse Mill				
1948–49	Travellers	3–1	Aughton Juniors		
1949–50	Woodhouse Mill	2–1	Marshall Sports		
1950–51	Effingham Steelworks	4–2	Sheffield Rovers		
1951–52	Kendray Sports		Weston Park	Thorncliffe	
1952–53	Crookes Working Men's Club	5–4	Kendray Sports		
1953–54	Yotar Sports	3–2	Lowshire Amateurs	Stocksbridge	
1954–55	Ecclesfield Colley Rovers	3–2	Aughton Juniors		
1955–56	Bellhouse Road Working Men's Club	7–2	Marshall Sports		
1956–57	Dinnington Miners Welfare	4–1	Bellhouse Road Working Men's Club		
1957–58	Yotar Sports	4–1	Jump United		
1958–59	Ecclesfield Red Rose	1–0	Manor Social	Hillsborough	
1959–60	Travellers Sports		Ford United		
1960–61	Laughton Common Miners Welfare	2–1	Kilnhurst Colliery		
1961–62	Ecclesfield Red Rose	1–0	Ardwick Working Men's Club	Hillsborough	
1962–63	Brinsworth Athletic	2–0	Kiveton Park Colliery United	Swallownest	
1963–64	Ecclesfield Red Rose		4–2	Emley	
1964–65	Crookes Working Men's Club				
1965–66	Northern Ideal Homesteads	2–1	Lundwood Working Men's Club		
1966–67	Bentley Victoria	4–3	Langold United		
1967–68	Lundwood Working Men's Club	3–0	Darnall Liberals		
1968–69	Barnsley Grammar School Old Boys	4–3	Lundwood Working Men's Club	Oakwell	
1969–70	Charlton United	–	Bentley Victoria		Bentley Victoria won but disqualified
1970–71	Monckton Colliery				
1971–72	Ecclesfield Red Rose	4–1	Dinnington Athletic reserves		
1972–73					No winner - Bentley Victoria disqualified
1973–74	Eldon Youth Club				
1974–75	Windsor				
1975–76	Eldon Youth Club				
1976–77	Ward Green Working Men's Club				
1977–78	Upperthong S.C.				
1978–79	Ward Green Working Men's Club				
1979–80	Eldon				
1980–81	Cutting Edge				
1981–82	Redfearn National Glass				
1982–83	Brookside Working Men's Club				
1983–84	Brodsworth Miners Welfare				
1984–85	Walton Miners Welfare				
1985–86	Kinsley Colts				
1986–87	Northgate Working Men's Club				
1987–88	Wharncliffe Arms				
1988–89	Storthes Hall				
1989–90	Athersley Recreation				
1990–91	Athersley Recreation				
1991–92	Athersley Recreation				
1992–93	Darfield Road Working Men's Club				
1993–94	Darfield Road Working Men's Club				
1994–95	Darfield Road Working Men's Club				
1995–96	Athersley Recreation				
1996–97	Athersley Recreation	1–0	Hemsworth Miners Welfare	Park Road	
1997–98	Hemsworth Miners Welfare	7–2	Jubilee Sports	Park Road	
1998–99	Edlington Working Men's Club	4–3	Hemsworth Miners Welfare	Belle Vue	
1999–00	Houghton Main	1–0	Hemsworth Saint Patricks	Bramall Lane	
2000–01	Cutting Edge	1–0	Nostell Miners Welfare	Belle Vue	
2001–02	Cutting Edge	3–0	Phoenix	Belle Vue	
2002–03	White Bear Athletic	2–2	Tomtreddlehoyle O35s	Oakwell	White Bear Athletic won on penalties
2003–04	Ryhill & Havercroft Sports	1–0	Nostell Miners Welfare	Oakwell	
2004–05	Hallam Malin O35s	1–1	Hall Green United	Oakwell	Hallam Malin O35s won on penalties
2005–06	Kinsley Boys	3–0	Tomtreddlehoyle O35s	Oakwell	
2006–07	Kinsley Boys	2–0	Hepworth United	Bracken Moor	
2007–08	Kirkburton	3–1	Telecom Sports O35s	Memorial Ground	
2008–09	Telecom Sports O35s	6–1	HSBC Bank O35s	Bracken Moor	
2009–10	Skelmanthorpe	3–1	HSBC Bank O35s	Oakwell	
2010–11	Jubilee Sports	3–1	Manor Castle	Bracken Moor	
2011–12	Shafton Villa	3–2	Jubilee Sports	Bracken Moor	
2012–13	Holmfirth Town	2–2	North Gawber Colliery	Sandy Lane	Holmfirth Town won on penalties
2013–14	Sheffield F.C. O35s	2–1	Byron House	Memorial Ground	
2014–15	Handsworth Parramore U21s	2–0	Sheffield F.C. O35s	Memorial Ground	
2015–16	Stocksbridge Park Steels U21s	4–1	Euroglaze	Welfare Ground	
2016–17	Rum Rooms Legacy	1–0	Hepworth United reserves	Memorial Ground	
2017–18	Brunsmeer Athletic	5–0	Swinton Athletic O35s	Memorial Ground	
2018–19	HSBC Bank O35s	3–2	Thurgoland Welfare	Keepmoat Stadium	
2021–22	Athersley Recreation O35s	7–0	Denaby United	Keepmoat Stadium	
2022–23	Athersley Recreation O35s	2–0	Elite	Keepmoat Stadium	
2023–24	Worksop Town reserves	3–2	Wickersley Old Village O35s	Oxford Street	
2024–25	Grange Moor Saints	2–2	Wombwell Town reserves	Steel City Stadium	Grange Moor Saints won on penalties

== See also ==
- Sheffield & Hallamshire Senior Cup
- Sheffield & Hallamshire Association Cup
- Sheffield & Hallamshire Junior Shield
