= Hatchard League =

- Founded: 1894
- Country: England

The Hatchard Football League was an English association football league based in Sheffield, South Yorkshire.

== History ==
Founded in 1892, it was originally called the Sheffield & District Alliance, only changing name to the Hatchard Cup League halfway through the 1893–94 season when a local politician called Frank Hatchard donated a trophy to the Sheffield & Hallamshire FA.

For many years there were numerous divisions, with the top sides from each section proceeding to end of season play-offs that would determine the overall winner. The league was suspended for the duration of the First World War, then disbanded altogether in 1923, but was re-introduced after the Second World War.

In 1983 the league merged with the Sheffield Association League to form the Sheffield & Hallamshire County Senior League, which (as of 2015) forms a part of the English football league system.

== Champions ==
Season	
1892–93	Elsecar
1893–94	Kiveton Park
1894–95	Heeley
1895–96	Kiveton Park
1896–97	Kimberworth
1897–98	Montrose Works
1898–99	Doncaster Rovers reserves & Treeton (shared)
1899–1900	Roundel
1900–01	Doncaster Rovers reserves
1901–02	Roundel reserves
1902–03	Hallam
1903–04	Rotherham Main
1904–05	Doncaster St James
1905–06	Parkgate Athletic
1906–07	Worksop Town reserves
1907–08	Thorpe Hesley
1908–09	Thorpe Hesley
1909–10	Dinnington Main
1910–11	Dinnington Main
1911–12	Cammells Sports
1912–13	Retford Town
1913–14	Bird In Hand
1914–15	Bird In Hand
1919–20	Treeton Reading Room & Beighton Recreation (shared)
1920–21	Beighton Recreation
1921–22	Treeton Reading Room
1922–23	Treeton Reading Room
1948–49	Hallam
1949–50	Thorncliffe Recreation
1950–51	Penistone Church
1951–52	Thorncliffe Recreation
1952–53	Thorncliffe Recreation reserves
1953–54	Wickersley Institute
1954–55	Atlas & Norfolk Works
1955–56	Atlas & Norfolk Works
1956–57	English Steel Corporation
1957–58	Dearne Community & Miners Welfare
1958–59	Dearne Community & Miners Welfare
1959–60	YMCA
1960–61	Penistone Church
1961–62	YMCA
1962–63	Sheffield United 'A'
1963–64	Davy United
1964–65	Sheffield United 'A'
1965–66	Frecheville Community
1966–67	Sheffield Waterworks
1967–68	Sheffield United 'A'
1968–69	City Surveyors
1969–70	Worsbrough Bridge Miners Welfare reserves

Season	Division 1	Division 2
1970–71	Charlton United	East Dene
1971–72	BSC Parkgate	Old Edwardians
1972–73	Old Edwardians	Ecclesfield Red Rose
1973–74	Old Edwardians	Firth Brown
1974–75	Ecclesfield Red Rose	Sheffield Waterworks
1975–76	Sheffield Waterworks reserves	TWIL
1976–77	Old Edwardians	Woodhouse Ashberry
1977–78	Woodhouse Ashberry	Crosspool Sports
1978–79	Ecclesfield ES	Windsor
1979–80	Oughtibridge War Memorial	Middlewood Hospital
1980–81	Stannington Village	Dormer Sports
1981–82	Windsor	James Fairley Steels
1982–83	Crookes Working Mens Club	Woodsetts Welfare
