= Sheffield Amateur League =

Sheffield Amateur Football League
- Founded: 1904
- Folded: 1987
- Country: England

The Sheffield Amateur League was a football competition for clubs in the Sheffield area of England. For many years it was behind only the Sheffield Association League in terms of seniority in the Sheffield and Hallamshire Football Association area.

== Honours ==
=== League champions ===
| Season | |
|---|---|
| 1904–05 | Clifton Mission |
| 1905–06 | Sharrow St Andrews |
| 1906–07 | Hathersage |
| 1907–08 | Midland Juniors |
| 1908–09 | Penistone Church |
| 1909–10 | Tinsley Church |
| 1910–11 | Penistone Church |
| 1911–12 | Atlas & Norfolk Works |
| 1912–13 | Hallam reserves |
| 1913–14 | Hallam reserves |
| 1914–15 | Blackburn |
| 1915–16 | No competition due to WWI |
| 1916–17 | No competition due to WWI |
| 1917–18 | No competition due to WWI |
| 1918–19 | No competition due to WWI |
| 1919–20 | Hathersage |
| 1920–21 | Malin Bridge Old Boys |
| 1921–22 | Darnall Old Boys |
| 1922–23 | Hallam |
| 1923–24 | Norton Woodseats |
| 1924–25 | Malin Bridge Old Boys |
| 1925–26 | Attercliffe Victory |
| 1926–27 | Hallam |
| 1927–28 | Dronfield Woodhouse |
| 1928–29 | Stocksbridge Church |
| 1929–30 | Stocksbridge Church |
| 1930–31 | Lopham Street United Methodists |
| 1931–32 | Fulwood |
| 1932–33 | Atlas & Norfolk Works |
| 1933–34 | Carbrook Hall Sports |
| 1934–35 | New Stubbin Colliery |
| 1935–36 | Dore |
| 1936–37 | Maltby Main |
| 1937–38 | Ecclesfield Red Rose |
| 1938–39 | St Phillips C&I |
| 1939–40 | Stocksbridge Works |
| 1940–41 | Merged with Sheffield City League during WWII to form Amateur-City League |
| 1941–42 | Merged with Sheffield City League during WWII to form Amateur-City League |
| 1942–43 | Merged with Sheffield City League during WWII to form Amateur-City League |
| 1943–44 | Merged with Sheffield City League during WWII to form Amateur-City League |
| 1944–45 | Merged with Sheffield City League during WWII to form Amateur-City League |
| 1945–46 | Tinsley Park WMC |
| 1946–47 | Tinsley Park WMC |
| 1947–48 | Hamptons Sports |
| 1948–49 | Aughton Juniors |
| 1949–50 | Oak Street |
| 1950–51 | Aughton Juniors |
| 1951–52 | Travellers Sports |
| 1952–53 | Crookes WMC |
| 1953–54 | Woodhouse Mill WMC |
| 1954–55 | Woodhouse Mill WMC |
| 1955–56 | Ecclesfield Colliery Rovers |
| 1956–57 | Travellers Sports |
| 1957–58 | Parson Cross |
| 1958–59 | Ecclesfield Red Rose |
| 1959–60 | Ecclesfield Red Rose |
| 1960–61 | Ecclesfield Red Rose |
| 1961–62 | Ecclesfield Red Rose |
| 1962–63 | Competition not finished |
| 1963–64 | Ecclesfield Red Rose |
| 1964–65 | Ecclesfield Red Rose |
| 1965–66 | Ecclesfield Red Rose |
| 1966–67 | Darnall Liberals |
| 1967–68 | Ecclesfield Red Rose |
| 1968–69 | Ecclesfield Red Rose |
| 1969–70 | Ecclesfield Red Rose |
| 1970–71 | Ecclesfield Red Rose |
| 1971–72 | Ecclesfield Red Rose reserves |
| 1972–73 | Windsor |
| 1973–74 | Woodhouse Ashberry |
| 1974–75 | Windsor |
| 1975–76 | Woodhouse Ashberry |
| 1976–77 | Mosborough Trinity |
| 1977–78 | Windsor |
| 1978–79 | Competition not finished |
| 1979–80 | Bellhouse Road WMC |
| 1980–81 | Arthur Lee & Son |
| 1981–82 | Bradley Well |
| 1982–83 | Bradley Well |
| 1983–84 | Mosborough Trinity |
| 1984–85 | Bradley Well |
| 1985–86 | Mosborough Trinity |
| 1986–87 | Mosborough Trinity |
