= Parkgate United F.C. =

Parkgate United
- Full name: Parkgate United Football Club

Parkgate United F.C. was an English association football club based in Parkgate, Rotherham, South Yorkshire.

== History ==
The club was formed in the early 1880s as Rawmarsh & Parkgate. They finished as runners-up in the 1895 Hatchard League and shared the Sheffield Association League title in 1899 with Worksop Town. They first entered the FA Cup in 1896.

== Honours ==
=== League ===
- Sheffield Association League
  - Champions: 1897–98, 1898–99 (shared)
- Hatchard League
  - Runners-up: 1894–95

== Records ==
- Best FA Cup performance: 3rd Qualifying Round, 1897–98
