= 1922–23 FA Cup qualifying rounds =

Tournament details
- Country: England; Wales

The 1922–23 FA Cup was the 48th season of the world's oldest football knockout competition; the Football Association Challenge Cup, or FA Cup for short.

The qualifying phase of the competition comprised eight rounds: an extra preliminary, preliminary and six sequentially numbered qualifying rounds. Twelve clubs won through to the first round proper draw from the 495 clubs who played in the qualifying rounds (including forty-eight in total who joined in qualifying rounds four and five).

== Rounds: draw information ==
For each successive round a draw was made pairing two teams for each tie. The default venue was the stadium of first of the two teams drawn; agreement was required from the FA to switch the venue; the FA could order a venue change if the appointed stadium was unsuitable. For matches where scores were level after ninety minutes a replay was arranged at the stadium of the team initially drawn as the away team; a thirty-minute extra time period was played if the scores were level after ninety minutes. If the replayed match was drawn further replays, with extra time if necessary, were held at neutral venues until a winner was determined.

Initially and through to the third qualifying round the draw was arranged into twenty-four geographic based divisions. As a large number of clubs entered the tournament from lower down the English football league system the competition started with an extra preliminary and preliminary rounds prior to the first qualifying round; matches were played in the divisions until the third qualifying round. For qualifying rounds four and five, stronger non-League and lower division Football League clubs were added to the draw. The final, sixth qualifying round, stage did not add any additional clubs to the draw and produced twelve clubs (from the 495 who contested the qualifying phase) to proceed to the first round proper.

Round	Date Played	Teams from Previous Round	Additional Teams	Total Teams	Ties Played
Extra preliminary round	9 September 1922	–	150	150	75
Preliminary round	23 September 1922	75	285	360	180
First qualifying round	7 October 1922	180	12	192	96
Second qualifying round	21 October 1922	96	0	96	48
Third qualifying round	4 November 1922	48	0	48	24
Fourth qualifying round	7 November 1922	24	24	48	24
Fifth qualifying round	2 December 1922	24	24	48	24
Sixth qualifying round	16 December 1922	24	0	24	12

Key to notes and abbreviations in the following tables
- Tie
  - Replay – Replay (after first match being a draw)
  - Replay 2' – Second replay (usually played on a neutral ground)
- Notes
  - aet – Match result after extra time played
  - void – Result voided (with score shown in brackets), reason as indicated
  - § – In the draw the away team were drawn as the home team
  - † – Win awarded. W: progressing club; x: eliminated club. Reason as indicated

== Extra preliminary to third qualifying round ==
The five rounds from the extra preliminary to the third qualifying involved 447 clubs from England and Wales. These were arranged into 24 geographically based divisions which thereby created matches against local rival clubs and limited the travelling required. Through a series of knock-out matches one team from each division progressed to the fourth qualifying round.

The number of clubs in each division varied: there were thirty-two clubs in division 8 who all therefore played in the extra preliminary round, but only thirteen clubs in divisions 16 and 17 which commenced at the preliminary round with three clubs receiving byes into the first qualifying round.

=== Division 1 (Northumberland / Tyneside / Wearside) ===
The division comprised 21 teams, of which 10 were drawn into the extra preliminary round to reduce the number to 16 teams required for 8 preliminary round ties.

The Felling Colliery club, members of the Northern Alliance, who had been the beneficiaries of home draws in each of their four ties (although they had required a replay to win their third qualifying tie), progressed from the division to the fourth qualifying round.

Tie	Home team	Score	Away team	Note
Extra preliminary round
	Chopwell Institute	3–1	Washington Colliery	
	Leslie's	2–3	Gateshead Town	
	Newburn	0–0	Lintz Institute	
Replay	Lintz Institute	1–0	Newburn	
	Seaton Delaval	1–2	Bedlington United	
	Walker Celtic	1–2	Scotswood	
Preliminary round
	Bedlington United	4–1	Chopwell Institute	
	Felling Colliery	2–0	Scotswood	
	Mickley	1–1	Lintz Institute	
Replay	Lintz Institute	1–0	Mickley	
	Prudhoe Castle	0–0	St Peters Albion	
Replay	St Peters Albion	3–0	Prudhoe Castle	
	Spen Black & White	5–0	Kibblesworth	
	St Anthony's Institute	2–0	Gateshead Town	
	Usworth Colliery	2–1	Preston Colliery	
	Wallsend BC	2–1	Jarrow	
First qualifying round
	Felling Colliery	2–0	St Peters Albion	
	Spen Black & White	(0–1)	Lintz Institute	void
	Lintz Institute disqualified			void
	Usworth Colliery	2–0	Bedlington United	
	Wallsend BC	5–0	St Anthony's Institute	
Second qualifying round
	Felling Colliery	2–0	Usworth Colliery	
	Spen Black & White	1–0	Wallsend BC	
Third qualifying round
	Felling Colliery	0–0	Spen Black & White	
Replay	Spen Black & White	0–1	Felling Colliery	

=== Division 2 (County Durham / Tyneside / Wearside) ===
The division comprised 23 teams, of which 14 were drawn into the extra preliminary round to reduce the number to 16 teams required for 8 preliminary round ties.

West Stanley, members of the North Eastern League, progressed from the division to the fourth qualifying round.

Tie	Home team	Score	Away team	Note
Extra preliminary round
	Annfield Plain	0–0	White-le-Head Rangers	
Replay	White-le-Head Rangers	2–1	Annfield Plain	
	Consett Swifts	1–2	Craghead United	
	Ferryhill Athletic	4–1	Trimdon Grange Colliery	
	Spennymoor United	8–1	Birtley	
	Sunderland West End	2–0	Hetton United	
	Thornley Albion	0–0	Dipton United	
Replay	Dipton United	2–1	Thornley Albion	
	Wingate Albion Comrades	0–1	Ouston Rovers	
Preliminary round
	Esh Winning	1–0	Dipton United	
	Ferryhill Athletic	5–0	Sunderland West End	
	Horden Athletic	2–1	Craghead United	
	Leadgate Park	3–1	Houghton	
	Ouston Rovers	3–1	Langley Park	
	Spennymoor United	6–2	Hobson Wanderers	
	West Stanley	3–0	Seaham Harbour	
	White-le-Head Rangers	1–1	Chester-le-Street	
Replay	Chester-le-Street	(1–2)	White-le-Head Rangers	void
Replay	White-le-Head Rangers disqualified for playing an ineligible player			void
First qualifying round
	Chester-le-Street	0–1	West Stanley	
	Ferryhill Athletic	2–1	Horden Athletic	
	Ouston Rovers	(3–1)	Leadgate Park	Void
	Ouston Rovers disqualified for playing an ineligible player			Void
	Spennymoor United	3–0	Esh Winning	
Second qualifying round
	Ferryhill Athletic	0–0	West Stanley	
Replay	West Stanley	3–1	Ferryhill Athletic	
	Spennymoor United	3–1	Leadgate Park	
Third qualifying round
	West Stanley	5–0	Spennymoor United	

=== Division 3 (County Durham / North Yorkshire / East Riding of Yorkshire) ===
The division comprised 19 teams, of which 6 were drawn into the extra preliminary round to reduce the number to 16 teams required for 8 preliminary round ties.

Cockfield, members of the Northern League, progressed from the division to the fourth qualifying round.

Tie	Home team	Score	Away team	Note
Extra preliminary round
	Bridlington Town	3–2	Eston United	
	South Bank East End	6–0	Filey	
	Stanley United	2–3	Willington	
Preliminary round
	Bridlington Town	5–3	Grangetown St Mary's	
	Brotton	1–1	Loftus Albion	
Replay	Loftus Albion	4–1	Brotton	
	Cockfield	2–1	Shildon Athletic	
	Coundon United	3–2	Darlington Rlwy Athletic	
	Scarborough	3–3	South Bank East End	
Replay	South Bank East End	2–3	Scarborough	aet
	Stockton	3–0	Rise Carr	
	Tow Law Town	3–2	Crook Town	
	Willington	8–0	Haverton Hill	
First qualifying round
	Cockfield	3–1	Loftus Albion	
	Scarborough	0–7	Willington	
	Stockton	4–3	Coundon United	
	Tow Law Town	5–1	Bridlington Town	
Second qualifying round
	Cockfield	3–2	Willington	
	Stockton	3–1	Tow Law Town	
Third qualifying round
	Stockton	0–1	Cockfield	

=== Division 4 (Cumbria) ===
The division comprised 16 teams, all of which were drawn into the preliminary round.

Workington, members of the North Eastern League, who had been drawn as the away team in their four ties (but owing to two switches of venue played away only twice), progressed from the division to the fourth qualifying round in which they were again drawn as the away team and defeated at Third Division North club Barrow.

Tie	Home team	Score	Away team	Note
Preliminary round
	Bowthorn Recreation	4–1	Arlecdon Red Rose	
	Egremont	4–4	Wigton Harriers	
Replay	Wigton Harriers	3–1	Egremont	
	Frizington Athletic	4–2	Whitehaven Athletic	
	Kendal Town	1–1	Windermere	
Replay	Windermere	(0–1)	Kendal Town	Void
Replay	Kendal Town disqualified (played an ineligible player)			Void
	Keswick	1–1	Cleator Moor Celtic	
Replay	Cleator Moor Celtic	5–1	Keswick	
	Moor Row Villa Rovers	3–4	Whitehaven CR	
	Penrith	2–2	Appleby	
Replay	Appleby	1–6	Penrith	
	Workington	3–3	Wath Brow United	§
Replay	Workington	2–1	Wath Brow United	
First qualifying round
	Bowthorn Recreation	3–3	Penrith	
Replay	Penrith	1–0	Bowthorn Recreation	aet
	Whitehaven CR	2–2	Frizington Athletic	
Replay	Frizington Athletic	1–2	Whitehaven CR	
	Wigton Harriers	1–4	Cleator Moor Celtic	
	Workington	7–0	Windermere	§
Second qualifying round
	Cleator Moor Celtic	1–2	Workington	
	Whitehaven CR	2–0	Penrith	
Third qualifying round
	Whitehaven CR	0–4	Workington	

=== Division 5 (Lancashire) ===
The division comprised 14 teams from which 6 preliminary round ties with drawn, resulting in byes to the first qualifying round for two clubs, Fleetwood and Lancaster Town.

Fleetwood, members of the Lancashire Combination, progressed from the division to the fourth qualifying round.

Tie	Home team	Score	Away team	Note
Preliminary round
	Burscough Rangers	2–7	Dick, Kerr's	
	Chorley	2–1	Darwen	
	Great Harwood	2–2	Lytham	
Replay	Lytham	2–1	Great Harwood	
	Leyland Motors	(2–1)	Horwich RMI	Void
	Leyland Motors disqualified for playing an ineligible player			Void
	Morecambe	2–2	Breightmet United	§
Replay	Morecambe	4–0	Breightmet United	
	Rossendale United	7–4	Leyland	
First qualifying round
	Dick, Kerr's	2–0	Lancaster Town	
	Horwich RMI	1–1	Chorley	
Replay	Chorley	1–0	Horwich RMI	
	Morecambe	1–0	Lytham	
	Rossendale United	1–1	Fleetwood	
Replay	Fleetwood	2–2	Rossendale United	aet
Replay 2	Rossendale United	1–4	Fleetwood	aet; @Wigan
Second qualifying round
	Fleetwood	1–0	Dick, Kerr's	
	Morecambe	2–1	Chorley	
Third qualifying round
	Morecambe	0–1	Fleetwood	

=== Division 6 (Lancashire / Derbyshire) ===
The division comprised 16 teams all of which were drawn into the preliminary round.

Eccles United, members of the Lancashire Combination, progressed from the division to the fourth qualifying round.

Tie	Home team	Score	Away team	Note
Preliminary round
	Buxton	5–1	Marlborough Old Boys	
	Chapel-en-le-Frith	5–1	Prescot	
	Eccles United	2–0	Glossop	
	Garston Gasworks	7–0	Youlgreave	
	Hurst	5–3	Whiston Parish	
	Marine	2–0	Atherton	
	Old Xaverians	1–3	Skelmersdale United	
	Prescot Wire Works	0–0	Runcorn	
Replay	Runcorn	3–0	Prescot Wire Works	
First qualifying round
	Buxton	2–0	Chapel-en-le-Frith	
	Eccles United	1–0	Marine	
	Garston Gasworks	4–6	Skelmersdale United	
	Runcorn	1–3	Hurst	
Second qualifying round
	Buxton	0–2	Eccles United	
	Skelmersdale United	2–3	Hurst	
Third qualifying round
	Hurst	2–2	Eccles United	
Replay	Eccles United	1–0	Hurst	

=== Division 7 (Cheshire) ===
The division comprised 15 teams, of which 14 were drawn into the preliminary with Harrowby receiving a bye to the first qualifying round.

New Brighton, members of the Lancashire Combination, progressed from the division to the fourth qualifying round. They won their next three qualifying matches before being eliminated in the first round proper at The Wednesday.

Tie	Home team	Score	Away team	Note
Preliminary round
	Ellesmere Port Cement	4–3	Lostock Gralam	
	Macclesfield	3–0	Nantwich Town	
	Middlewich	1–3	Sandbach Ramblers	
	New Brighton	4–2	Chester	
	Northwich Victoria	2–0	Ellesmere Port Town	
	Winsford United	0–1	Port Sunlight	
	Witton Albion	3–0	West Kirby	
First qualifying round
	Ellesmere Port Cement	2–1	Macclesfield	
	Harrowby	0–2	Witton Albion	
	Northwich Victoria	0–1	New Brighton	
	Port Sunlight	0–0	Sandbach Ramblers	
Replay	Sandbach Ramblers	1–0	Port Sunlight	
Second qualifying round
	Sandbach Ramblers	2–0	Ellesmere Port Cement	
	Witton Albion	1–2	New Brighton	
Third qualifying round
	New Brighton	5–0	Sandbach Ramblers	

=== Division 8 (West Midlands, Herefordshire and north Wales Border) ===
The division comprised 32 teams from the counties of Herefordshire, Shropshire, Staffordshire, South Warwickshire, Worcestershire and north Wales Border. All the teams were drawn into the extra preliminary round.

Wellington St George's, a Junior status club of the Birmingham Combination, who had been the beneficiaries of home draws in each of their five ties, progressed from the division to the fourth qualifying round. They were drawn at home for their next two ties both of which were against Third Division North clubs: defeating Tranmere Rovers before being eliminated by Walsall.

Tie	Home team	Score	Away team	Note
Extra preliminary round
	Bilston United	3–0	Talbot Stead	§
	Bloxwich Strollers	3–0	Cannock Town	
	Boldmere St. Michael's	1–1	Wednesbury Old Athletic	
Replay	Wednesbury Old Athletic	1–2	Boldmere St. Michael's	
	Brierley Hill Alliance	6–1	West Birmingham	
	Bromsgrove Rovers	6–1	Hereford Thistle	
	Chirk	1–2	Shrewsbury Town	
	Darlaston	3–2	Hednesford Town	
	Halesowen	0–3	Cradley Heath	
	Kidderminster Harriers	3–2	Redditch	
	Leamington Town	1–1	Willenhall	
Replay	Willenhall	12–1	Leamington Town	
	Oswestry Town	2–1	Wellington Town	
	Stafford Rangers	9–1	Wolseley Athletic	§
	Stourbridge	3–1	Birmingham Corp Tramways	§
	Wellington St George's	3–2	Oakengates Town	
	Wolverhampton Amateurs	W–x	Rugeley (scratched)	†
	Worcester City	7–0	Hereford St Martin's	
Preliminary round
	Bloxwich Strollers	3–0	Wolverhampton Amateurs	
	Boldmere St. Michael's	0–4	Bilston United	
	Cradley Heath	3–2	Brierley Hill Alliance	
	Darlaston	1–0	Willenhall	
	Kidderminster Harriers	3–2	Bromsgrove Rovers	
	Shrewsbury Town	3–2	Worcester City	
	Stafford Rangers	3–0	Stourbridge	
	Wellington St George's	4–0	Oswestry Town	
First qualifying round
	Bilston United	1–4	Shrewsbury Town	
	Bloxwich Strollers	4–1	Cradley Heath	
	Stafford Rangers	3–1	Kidderminster Harriers	
	Wellington St George's	1–0	Darlaston	
Second qualifying round
	Stafford Rangers	2–3	Shrewsbury Town	
	Wellington St George's	1–0	Bloxwich Strollers	
Third qualifying round
	Wellington St George's	2–1	Shrewsbury Town	

=== Division 9 (East Nottinghamshire / East Riding of Yorkshire / North Riding of Yorkshire border / Lincolnshire) ===
The division comprised 15 teams of which 14 were drawn into the preliminary round; Midland League club Scunthorpe & Lindsey United who received a bye to the first qualifying round progressed from the division to the fourth qualifying round.

Tie	Home team	Score	Away team	Note
Preliminary round
	Barton Town	0–0	Hull Old Boys	
Replay	Hull Old Boys	4–0	Barton Town	
	Boston	5–2	Cleethorpes Town	
	Brigg Town	2–2	Gainsborough Trinity	
Replay	Gainsborough Trinity	4–1	Brigg Town	
	Grimsby Rovers	0–3	Charltons (Grimsby)	
	Holderness Athletic	0–1	Hull Dairycoates	
	Horncastle Town	1–1	Grimsby Haycroft Rovers	
Replay	Grimsby Haycroft Rovers	8–1	Horncastle Town	
	Retford Town	3–0	Selby Town	
First qualifying round
	Boston	4–1	Hull Dairycoates	§
	Gainsborough Trinity	5–0	Hull Old Boys	
	Retford Town	2–2	Grimsby Haycroft Rovers	§
Replay	Retford Town	4–1	Grimsby Haycroft Rovers	aet
	Scunthorpe & Lindsey United	3–0	Charltons (Grimsby)	
Second qualifying round
	Boston	2–1	Retford Town	
	Gainsborough Trinity	1–2	Scunthorpe & Lindsey United	
Third qualifying round
	Boston	0–1	Scunthorpe & Lindsey United	

=== Division 10 (West Riding of Yorkshire) ===
The division comprised 15 teams, of which 14 were drawn into the preliminary with Castleford Town receiving a bye to the first qualifying round.

Wath Athletic, members of the Midland League, who had been involved in three replays in the four rounds in which they played, progressed from the division to the fourth qualifying round.

Tie	Home team	Score	Away team	Note
Preliminary round
	Bentley Colliery Welfare	1–0	Wombwell	
	Cudworth Village	0–4	Doncaster Rovers	
	Denaby United	8–0	Guiseley	§
	Frickley Colliery	0–0	Brodsworth Main Colliery	
Replay	Brodsworth Main Colliery	0–1	Frickley Colliery	
	Mexborough	4–0	Horsforth	
	South Kirkby Colliery	1–1	Liversedge	
Replay	Liversedge	4–1	South Kirkby Colliery	
	Wath Athletic	1–1	Fryston Colliery	
Replay	Wath Athletic	4–1	Fryston Colliery	§
First qualifying round
	Castleford Town	0–0	Frickley Colliery	
Replay	Frickley Colliery	1–0	Castleford Town	
	Denaby United	0–0	Doncaster Rovers	
Replay	Doncaster Rovers	4–1	Denaby United	
	Mexborough	4–0	Bentley Colliery Welfare	
	Wath Athletic	7–2	Liversedge	
Second qualifying round
	Frickley Colliery	0–0	Wath Athletic	
Replay	Wath Athletic	1–0	Frickley Colliery	
	Mexborough	0–0	Doncaster Rovers	
Replay	Doncaster Rovers	2–0	Mexborough	
Third qualifying round
	Doncaster Rovers	0–0	Wath Athletic	
Replay	Wath Athletic	2–1	Doncaster Rovers	

=== Division 11 (Southern West Riding of Yorkshire) ===
The draw for the division comprised 17 teams of which 2 were drawn into the extra preliminary round to reduce the number to 16 teams required for 8 preliminary round ties.

Rotherham Town, members of the Midland League, progressed from the division to the fourth qualifying round.

Tie	Home team	Score	Away team	Note
Extra preliminary round
	Woodhouse	0–0	Anston Athletic	
Replay	Anston Athletic	x–W	Woodhouse	†
Preliminary round
	Ardsley Athletic	0–1	Kiveton Park	
	Dinnington Main Colliery	3–2	Houghton Main Colliery	
	Laughton Common	3–2	Rawmarsh Athletic	
	Prospect United	1–1	Birdwell	
Replay	Birdwell	1–4	Prospect United	aet
	Rossington Main	1–2	Woodhouse	
	Rotherham Amateurs	0–0	Maltby Main Colliery	
Replay	Maltby Main Colliery	3–1	Rotherham Amateurs	
	Rotherham Town	4–1	Atlas & Norfolk Works	
	Treeton Reading Room	4–1	Sheffield	
First qualifying round
	Dinnington Main Colliery	1–1	Rotherham Town	
Replay	Rotherham Town	2–0	Dinnington Main Colliery	
	Kiveton Park	1–0	Maltby Main Colliery	
	Laughton Common	0–1	Treeton Reading Room	
	Woodhouse	0–0	Prospect United	
Replay	Prospect United	0–2	Woodhouse	
Second qualifying round
	Kiveton Park	2–0	Treeton Reading Room	
	Rotherham Town	3–0	Woodhouse	
Third qualifying round
	Rotherham Town	1–0	Kiveton Park	

=== Division 12 (Derbyshire) ===
The division comprised 16 teams drawn into 8 preliminary round ties.

Alfreton Town, members of the Central Alliance, progressed from the division to the fourth qualifying round.

Tie	Home team	Score	Away team	Note
Preliminary round
	Alfreton Town	2–1	Staveley Town	
	Bolsover Colliery	4–0	Clay Cross Town	
	Creswell Colliery	2–2	Grassmoor Ivanhoe	
Replay	Grassmoor Ivanhoe	3–2	Creswell Colliery	
	Eckington Works	3–2	Heanor Town	
	Ilkeston United	6–0	New Tupton United	§
	Long Eaton	0–1	Matlock Town	
	Pinxton	6–1	Clay Cross Zingari	
	South Normanton Colliery	5–1	Blackwell Colliery	
First qualifying round
	Alfreton Town	3–0	Bolsover Colliery	
	Grassmoor Ivanhoe	1–1	Eckington Works	
Replay	Eckington Works	0–1	Grassmoor Ivanhoe	
	Pinxton	3–1	Matlock Town	
	South Normanton Colliery	1–2	Ilkeston United	
Second qualifying round
	Alfreton Town	9–0	Grassmoor Ivanhoe	
	Ilkeston United	2–0	Pinxton	
Third qualifying round
	Ilkeston United	0–0	Alfreton Town	
Replay	Alfreton Town	2–1	Ilkeston United	

=== Division 13 (Nottinghamshire / Derbyshire border) ===
The division comprised 18 teams, of which four were drawn into the extra preliminary round to reduce the number to 16 teams required for 8 preliminary round ties.

Mansfield Town, members of the Midland League, progressed from the division to the fourth qualifying round.

Tie	Home team	Score	Away team	Note
Extra preliminary round
	Langwith Athletic	2–0	New Hucknall Colliery	
	Lenton	1–1	Basford United	
Replay	Basford United	2–3	Lenton	
Preliminary round
	Arnold St Mary's	0–3	Sutton Junction	
	Hucknall Byron	3–0	Whitwell Colliery	
	Lenton	2–1	Grantham	
	Mansfield Town	2–1	Langwith Athletic	
	Newark Athletic	4–1	Clifton Colliery	
	Shirebrook	4–1	Sneinton	
	Sutton Town	6–1	Boots Athletic	
	Welbeck Colliery	6–0	Mansfield Colliery	§
First qualifying round
	Lenton	2–3	Sutton Town	
	Mansfield Town	3–1	Shirebrook	
	Sutton Junction	2–0	Newark Athletic	
	Welbeck Colliery	3–0	Hucknall Byron	
Second qualifying round
	Mansfield Town	3–0	Sutton Junction	
	Welbeck Colliery	0–2	Sutton Town	
Third qualifying round
	Sutton Town	1–4	Mansfield Town	

=== Division 14 (Leicestershire and adjacent area) ===
The division comprised 18 teams from Leicestershire, southern Derbyshire, Staffordshire border and northern Warwickshire. Four of these were drawn into the extra preliminary round to reduce the number to 16 teams required for 8 preliminary round ties.

Coalville Swifts, members of the Leicestershire Senior League, progressed from the division to the fourth qualifying round.

Tie	Home team	Score	Away team	Note
Extra preliminary round
	Gresley Colliery	0–3	Moira United	
	Measham Town	3–1	Atherstone Town	
Preliminary round
	Ashby Town	0–1	Hinckley United	
	Coalville Swifts	3–0	Barwell United	
	Gresley Rovers	6–0	Stableford Works	§
	Measham Town	1–2	Newhall Swifts	
	Moira United	4–2	Rugby Town	
	Nuneaton Town	5–0	Coalville Town	§
	Shepshed Albion	0–4	Loughborough Corinthians	
	Whitwick Imperial	4–1	Burton All Saints	
First qualifying round
	Gresley Rovers	3–1	Newhall Swifts	
	Hinckley United	0–3	Nuneaton Town	
	Loughborough Corinthians	1–2	Coalville Swifts	
	Whitwick Imperial	1–1	Moira United	
Replay	Moira United	0–2	Whitwick Imperial	
Second qualifying round
	Coalville Swifts	1–0	Gresley Rovers	
	Nuneaton Town	3–2	Whitwick Imperial	
Third qualifying round
	Coalville Swifts	3–2	Nuneaton Town	

=== Division 15 (Northamptonshire / southern Lincolnshire / northern Bedfordshire) ===
The division comprised 17 teams, of which two were drawn into the extra preliminary round to reduce the number to 16 teams required for 8 preliminary round ties.

Higham Ferrers Town, members of the Northamptonshire League, who played in eight matches (including two second replays) in the four rounds in which they competed, progressed from the division to the fourth qualifying round. In that round, owing to a void match they played twice against King's Lynn before, in the next round, being eliminated by Chesterfield.

Tie	Home team	Score	Away team	Note
Extra preliminary round
	Wolverton Town	2–4	Rothwell Town	
Preliminary round
	Bedford Town	2–0	Harborough Town	
	Brotherhood Works	2–2	Desborough Town	
Replay	Desborough Town	2–1	Brotherhood Works	
	Fletton United	0–0	Northampton Wanderers	
Replay	Northampton Wanderers	0–2	Fletton United	
	Higham Ferrers Town	8–0	Peterborough G.N. Loco	§
	Irthlingborough Town	1–2	Wellingborough Town	
	Kettering Town	3–0	Stamford	
	Peterborough Westwood Wks	1–4	Spalding United	
	Rothwell Town	2–1	Rushden Town	
First qualifying round
	Fletton United	5–1	Kettering Town	
	Higham Ferrers Town	0–0	Bedford Town	
Replay	Bedford Town	1–1	Higham Ferrers Town	aet
Replay 2	Higham Ferrers Town	4–1	Bedford Town	@Rushden
	Rothwell Town	4–0	Wellingborough Town	
	Spalding United	2–0	Desborough Town	
Second qualifying round
	Fletton United	1–0	Rothwell Town	
	Higham Ferrers Town	3–0	Spalding United	
Third qualifying round
	Fletton United	0–0	Higham Ferrers Town	
Replay	Higham Ferrers Town	2–2	Fletton United	aet
Replay 2	Fletton United	1–2	Higham Ferrers Town	@Northampton

=== Division 16 (Norfolk / Suffolk / Cambridgeshire / NE Essex) ===
The division comprised 13 teams from which 5 preliminary round ties were drawn, resulting in byes to the first qualifying round for three teams; Cambridge Town, Harwich & Parkeston and Norwich CEYMS.

King's Lynn, members of the Norfolk & Suffolk League, progressed from the division to the fourth qualifying round.

Tie	Home team	Score	Away team	Note
Preliminary round
	Bury St Edmund's	3–1	Cromer	
	Leiston Works Athletic	1–0	Colchester Town	
	Lowestoft	2–3	Great Yarmouth Town	
	Newmarket Town	0–1	Orwell Works	
	Norwich Institute	1–3	King's Lynn	
First qualifying round
	Bury St Edmund's	0–1	Harwich & Parkeston	
	Cambridge Town	0–1	King's Lynn	
	Great Yarmouth Town	3–1	Orwell Works	
	Norwich CEYMS	1–2	Leiston Works Athletic	
Second qualifying round
	Great Yarmouth Town	0–2	King's Lynn	
	Harwich & Parkeston	1–2	Leiston Works Athletic	
Third qualifying round
	King's Lynn	3–1	Leiston Works Athletic	

=== Division 17 (Essex / East London) ===
The division comprised 13 teams from which 5 preliminary round ties were drawn, resulting in byes to the first qualifying round for three teams; Clapton, Grays Athletic and Walthamstow Grange.

Clapton, members of the Isthmian League, progressed from the division to the fourth qualifying round.

Tie	Home team	Score	Away team	Note
Preliminary round
	Chelmsford	4–1	Leyton	§
	Custom House	W–x	Walthamstow Town	†
	GER Romford	2–1	Shoeburyness Garrison	
	Gnome Athletic	4–0	Sterling Athletic	
	Walthamstow Avenue	0–2	Leytonstone	
First qualifying round
	Clapton	2–0	Gnome Athletic	
	Custom House	1–1	Chelmsford	
Replay	Chelmsford	0–0	Custom House	aet
Replay 2	Custom House	3–1	Chelmsford	aet, @Ilford
	Leytonstone	1–1	Grays Athletic	
Replay	Grays Athletic	1–2	Leytonstone	
	Walthamstow Grange	0–1	GER Romford	
Second qualifying round
	Clapton	4–2	Custom House	
	GER Romford	1–3	Leytonstone	
Third qualifying round
	Clapton	3–0	Leytonstone	

=== Division 18 (Bedfordshire / Hertfordshire / Middlesex) ===
The division comprised 27 teams, of which 22 were drawn into the extra preliminary round to reduce the number to 16 teams required for 8 preliminary round ties.

Edmonton, members of the London League, who in the five rounds in which they competed had played in seven matches and additionally been the beneficiary of a replay walkover, progressed from the division to the fourth qualifying round, in which they again played in a replay, losing to Ilford.

Tie	Home team	Score	Away team	Note
Extra preliminary round
	Apsley	2–3	Welwyn Garden City	
	Arlesley Town	0–4	Deerfield Athletic	
	Biggleswade & District	2–1	Barnet	
	Cheshunt	0–0	Wood Green Town	
Replay	Wood Green Town	0–5	Cheshunt	
	Edmonton	6–0	Polytechnic	
	Hitchin Athletic	2–4	LNWR (Wembley)	
	Hitchin Blue Cross	1–2	Hertford Town	
	Letchworth Town	4–1	Luton Clarence	
	Luton Amateurs	5–0	Waterlows (Dunstable)	
	Old Lyonian	0–1	St Neots & District	
	Wealdstone	2–0	Berkhamsted Town	
Preliminary round
	Biggleswade & District	2–1	Wealdstone	
	Enfield	2–1	Hampstead Town	
	Hertford Town	2–3	Fricker's Athletic	
	Leavesden Mental Hospital	3–1	Welwyn Garden City	
	Letchworth Town	2–1	Cheshunt	
	Luton Amateurs	1–1	LNWR (Wembley)	
Replay	LNWR (Wembley)	0–1	Luton Amateurs	
	RAF Henlow	1–0	Deerfield Athletic	
	St Neots & District	2–2	Edmonton	
Replay	Edmonton	W–x	St Neots & District (scratched)	†
First qualifying round
	Edmonton	2–1	RAF Henlow	
	Enfield	1–0	Letchworth Town	
	Fricker's Athletic	0–1	Biggleswade & District	
	Luton Amateurs	0–2	Leavesden Mental Hospital	
Second qualifying round
	Biggleswade & District	1–1	Edmonton	
Replay	Edmonton	1–0	Biggleswade & District	
	Enfield	5–1	Leavesden Mental Hospital	
Third qualifying round
	Enfield	2–2	Edmonton	
Replay	Edmonton	5–1	Enfield	

=== Division 19 (Berkshire / Buckinghamshire / Oxfordshire) ===
The division comprised 15 teams from which seven preliminary round ties were drawn, resulting in a bye to the first qualifying round for Slough.

Chesham United, members of the Spartan League, progressed from the division to the fourth qualifying round.

Tie	Home team	Score	Away team	Note
Preliminary round
	Maidenhead United	3–1	Reading Amateurs	
	Slough Trading Estate	x–W	Henley Town	†
	Southall	5–0	Hanwell Athletic	
	Uxbridge	4–1	Henley Comrades	
	Windsor & Eton	1–2	Chesham United	
	Wycombe Wanderers	7–1	Marlow	§
	Yiewsley	2–2	Botwell Mission	
Replay	Botwell Mission	6–1	Yiewsley	
First qualifying round
	Botwell Mission	5–3	Maidenhead United	
	Chesham United	5–3	Southall	
	Slough	8–0	Henley Town	§
	Uxbridge	1–6	Wycombe Wanderers	
Second qualifying round
	Chesham United	6–0	Botwell Mission	
	Wycombe Wanderers	0–2	Slough	
Third qualifying round
	Chesham United	5–1	Slough	

=== Division 20 (Surrey / northern Hampshire) ===
The division comprised 27 teams, of which 22 were drawn into the extra preliminary round to reduce the number to 16 teams required for 8 preliminary round ties.

Guildford United, members of the Southern League, progressed from the division to the fourth qualifying round.

Tie	Home team	Score	Away team	Note
Extra preliminary round
	Basingstoke	W–x	Aldershot Excelsior	†
	Croydon	x–W	Carshalton Athletic	†
	Egham	2–0	Aldershot Institute Albion	
	Farnham United Breweries	3–1	Wellington Works	
	Guildford	1–3	RAE Farnborough	
	Gwynnes Athletic	2–4	Summerstown	
	Hersham United	8–2	Dorking	
	Kingstonian	1–0	Tooting Town	
	Nunhead	2–0	Burberry Athletic	§
	RAMC Aldershot	0–1	Woking	
	Walton-on-Thames	0–5	Sutton United	
Preliminary round
	Egham	4–1	Camberley & Yorktown	
	Farnham United Breweries	2–2	Basingstoke	
Replay	Basingstoke	0–1	Farnham United Breweries	
	Kingstonian	2–1	Sutton United	
	Nunhead	2–1	Carshalton Athletic	
	Metrogas	0–2	Hersham United	
	RAE Farnborough	1–3	Woking	
	Redhill	0–4	Guildford United	
	Summerstown	1–2	Wimbledon	
First qualifying round
	Egham	0–4	Wimbledon	
	Guildford United	4–0	Nunhead	
	Hersham United	2–6	Farnham United Breweries	
	Woking	2–2	Kingstonian	
Replay	Kingstonian	0–3	Woking	
Second qualifying round
	Farnham United Breweries	2–4	Wimbledon	
	Woking	0–1	Guildford United	
Third qualifying round
	Guildford United	4–0	Wimbledon	

=== Division 21 (Kent / Sussex) ===
The division comprised 24 teams, of which 16 were drawn into the extra preliminary round to reduce the number to 16 teams required for 8 preliminary round ties.

Sittingbourne, members of the Kent League, progressed from the division to the fourth qualifying round.

Tie	Home team	Score	Away team	Note
Extra preliminary round
	Ashford Railway Works	6–2	Margate	
	Bexleyheath Town	7–1	Woolwich Polytechnic	
	Bostall Heath	6–1	Bromley	
	Horsham	3–3	Southwick	
Replay	Southwick	4–2	Horsham	
	Sheppey United	1–0	Erith & Belvedere	
	Tunbridge Wells Rangers	1–1	Sittingbourne	
Replay	Sittingbourne	2–0	Tunbridge Wells Rangers	
	Whitstable	0–0	Ramsgate	
Replay	Ramsgate	(6–4)	Whitstable	Void
Replay	Playing pitch size infringement			Void
Replay	Whitstable	3–2	Ramsgate	@ Whitstable
	Worthing	1–1	Shoreham	
Replay	Shoreham	1–1	Worthing	aet
Replay 2	Worthing	3–2	Shoreham	@Brighton
Preliminary round
	Ashford Railway Works	1–2	Chatham	
	Bexleyheath Town	1–2	Whitstable	
	Bostall Heath	5–0	Worthing	
	Catford Southend	1–2	Sittingbourne	
	Folkestone	3–3	Northfleet United	
Replay	Northfleet United	4–1	Folkestone	aet
	Royal Engrs. Comrades	4–0	Newhaven	
	Sheppey United	1–1	Dartford	
Replay	Dartford	2–1	Sheppey United	
	Southwick	1–2	Vernon Athletic	
First qualifying round
	Bostall Heath	1–2	Dartford	
	Northfleet United	0–0	Chatham	
Replay	Chatham	1–3	Northfleet United	
	Royal Engrs. Comrades	1–1	Vernon Athletic	
Replay	Vernon Athletic	2–1	Royal Engrs. Comrades	aet
	Whitstable	2–4	Sittingbourne	
Second qualifying round
	Dartford	3–1	Vernon Athletic	§
	Sittingbourne	2–0	Northfleet United	
Third qualifying round
	Sittingbourne	1–0	Dartford	

=== Division 22 (Hampshire / Dorset / Isle of Wight / Wiltshire) ===
The division comprised 20 teams from which 4 extra preliminary round ties were drawn, to reduce the number to 16 teams required for 8 preliminary round ties.

Boscombe, members of the Southern League, progressed from the division to the fourth qualifying round.

Tie	Home team	Score	Away team	Note
Extra preliminary round
	Bournemouth Amateurs	0–3	Bournemouth Gasworks Ath.	
	Eastleigh Athletic	1–4	Portsmouth Amateurs	
	Gosport Athletic	2–1	Salisbury City	
	Weymouth	1–0	Poole	
Preliminary round
	Boscombe	3–0	Blandford	
	Bournemouth Gasworks Ath.	3–0	Salisbury Corinthians	
	Bournemouth Tramways	5–2	Westham (Weymouth)	§
	Gosport Athletic	1–0	Weymouth	
	Portsea Gas Company	6–0	East Cowes Victoria Athletic	
	Ryde Sports	1–0	Osborne Athletic	
	Sholing Athletic	1–1	Portsmouth Amateurs	
Replay	Portsmouth Amateurs	1–3	Sholing Athletic	
	Thornycrofts (Woolston)	2–1	Portland United	
First qualifying round
	Bournemouth Tramways	1–2	Boscombe	
	Gosport Athletic	2–1	Ryde Sports	
	Portsea Gas Company	3–1	Bournemouth Gasworks Ath.	
	Thornycrofts (Woolston)	1–3	Sholing Athletic	
Second qualifying round
	Boscombe	2–1	Sholing Athletic	
	Portsea Gas Company	1–1	Gosport Athletic	
Replay	Gosport Athletic	5–2	Portsea Gas Company	
Third qualifying round
	Boscombe	4–0	Gosport Athletic	

=== Division 23 (Devon / Gloucestershire / Somerset / Wiltshire) ===
The division comprised 20 teams, of which 8 were drawn into the extra preliminary round to reduce the number to 16 teams required for 8 preliminary round ties.

Welton Rovers, members of the Western League, progressed from the division to the fourth qualifying round.

Tie	Home team	Score	Away team	Note
Extra preliminary round
	Clevedon	4–2	Timsbury Athletic	
	Coleford Athletic	2–0	Minehead	
	Spencer Moulton	1–3	Yeovil & Petters United	
	Warminster Town	1–2	Clutton Wanderers	
Preliminary round
	Frome Town	1–2	Welton Rovers	
	Melksham & Avon United	3–2	Clutton Wanderers	
	Radstock Town	0–2	Devizes Town	
	Street	2–5	Coleford Athletic	
	Torquay United	3–0	Clevedon	§
	Trowbridge Town	8–0	Glastonbury	
	Westbury United	3–3	Calne & Harris United	
Replay	Calne & Harris United	6–0	Westbury United	
	Yeovil & Petters United	5–2	Peasedown St John	
First qualifying round
	Melksham & Avon United	2–2	Devizes Town	
Replay	Devizes Town	1–2	Melksham & Avon United	
	Trowbridge Town	1–1	Coleford Athletic	
Replay	Coleford Athletic	2–1	Trowbridge Town	
	Welton Rovers	3–2	Torquay United	
	Yeovil & Petters United	8–1	Calne & Harris United	
Second qualifying round
	Melksham & Avon United	2–3	Coleford Athletic	
	Welton Rovers	2–1	Yeovil & Petters United	
Third qualifying round
	Coleford Athletic	1–2	Welton Rovers	

=== Division 24 (Bristol / Gloucestershire / Somerset / south Wales / northern Wiltshire) ===
The division comprised 16 teams all of which were drawn into the preliminary round.

Bath City, members of the Southern League, who had been the beneficiaries of home draws in each of their four ties, progressed from the division to the fourth qualifying round. They won their next three qualifying matches before being eliminated in the first round proper at Wigan Borough.

Tie	Home team	Score	Away team	Note
Preliminary round
	Barry	1–0	Llanelli Town	
	Bath City	7–1	Horfield United	
	Bristol St George	3–0	Chippenham Town	
	Cardiff Corinthians	2–0	Ton Pentre	
	Clandown	0–2	Swindon Victoria	
	Ebbw Vale	4–1	Paulton Rovers	
	Hanham Athletic	2–1	Chippenham Rovers	
	Porth Athletic	2–0	Pontypridd	
First qualifying round
	Bath City	2–0	Hanham Athletic	
	Ebbw Vale	3–1	Barry	
	Porth Athletic	3–3	Cardiff Corinthians	
Replay	Cardiff Corinthians	2–0	Porth Athletic	@Cardiff City
	Swindon Victoria	4–0	Bristol St George	
Second qualifying round
	Bath City	2–0	Ebbw Vale	
	Cardiff Corinthians	1–0	Swindon Victoria	
Third qualifying round
	Bath City	2–0	Cardiff Corinthians	

== Fourth qualifying round ==
There were forty-eight clubs included in the fourth qualifying round draw: the twenty-four teams from the qualifying divisions (identified below by the inclusion of their divisional number) were joined by twelve non-League clubs who were not part of the earlier qualifying rounds (Barking, Blyth Spartans, Carlisle United, Dulwich Hamlet, Ilford, London Caledonians, Oxford City, Maidstone United, South Bank, St Albans City, Tufnell Park and Worksop Town) and twelve clubs from the Football League: ten from the Third Division North (Barrow, Chesterfield, Crewe Alexandra, Durham City, Halifax Town, Lincoln City, Nelson, Rochdale, Tranmere Rovers and Wigan Borough) and two from the Third Division South (Exeter City and Southend United).

The ties were drawn on a regional basis and included fourteen in which both participants were non-League clubs; two in which both clubs were from the Football League; and eight in which non-League clubs were paired with Football League clubs. In the latter group two non-League clubs were successful, both over Third Division North opposition: Wellington St George's, a Junior status club from the Birmingham Combination, defeated Tranmere Rovers; and New Brighton of the Lancashire Combination were victors in a replay at Crewe Alexandra.

From the twenty-four ties sixteen non-League clubs (including nine from the qualifying divisions), six Third Division North clubs and two Third Division South progressed into the next round.

Key to the leagues in which the clubs competed (as appended to their name):-

- AL – Athenian League
- BC – Birmingham Combination
- CA – Central Alliance
- D2 – Second Division
- D3N – Third Division North
- D3S – Third Division South
- IL – Isthmian League
- KL – Kent League
- LC – Lancashire Combination
- LL – London League
- LSL – Leicestershire Senior League
- ML – Midland League
- NA – Northern Alliance
- NEL – North Eastern League
- NL – Northern League
- NoL – Northamptonshire League`
- N&SL – Norfolk & Suffolk League
- SL – Southern League
- SpL – Spartan League
- WL – Western League

(Numbers prefaced by Q indicate, where appropriate, the club's qualifying division)

Tie	Home team	Score	Away team	Note
	Barking (LL)	3–5	Clapton (Q17) (IL)	
	Barrow (D3N)	1–0	Workington (Q4) (NEL)	
	Carlisle United (NEL)	7–1	Fleetwood (Q5) (LC)	
	Chesham United (Q19) (SpL)	5–2	Oxford City (IL)	
	Chesterfield (D3N)	2–0	Lincoln City (D3N)	
	Coalville Swifts (Q14) (LSL)	0–2	Mansfield Town (Q13) (ML)	
	Cockfield (Q3) (NL)	0–1	Felling Colliery (Q1) (NA)	
	Durham City (D3N)	2–1	West Stanley (Q2) (NEL)	
	Edmonton (Q18) (LL)	1–1	Ilford (IL)	
Replay	Ilford (IL)	3–0	Edmonton (Q18) (LL)	
	Exeter City (D3S)	0–0	Boscombe (Q22) (SL)	
Replay	Boscombe (Q22) (SL)	1–3	Exeter City (D3S)	
	Halifax Town (D3N)	6–1	Rotherham Town (Q11) (ML)	§
	Higham Ferrers Town (Q15) (NoL)	(3–1)	King's Lynn (Q16) (N&SL)	Void
	Higham Ferrers played an ineligible player			Void
Replay	King's Lynn (Q16) (N&SL)	2–5	Higham Ferrers Town (Q15) (NoL)	
	Maidstone United (KL)	2–1	Guildford United (Q20) (SL)	
	New Brighton (Q7) (LC)	1–1	Crewe Alexandra (D3N)	
Replay	Crewe Alexandra (D3N)	0–1	New Brighton (Q7) (LC)	
	Rochdale (D3N)	0–1	Nelson (D3N)	
	Sittingbourne (Q21) (KL)	0–0	Southend United (D3S)	
Replay	Southend United (D3S)	4–2	Sittingbourne (Q21) (KL)	
	South Bank (NL)	1–1	Blyth Spartans (NEL)	
Replay	Blyth Spartans (NEL)	3–2	South Bank (NL)	
	St Albans City (AL)	1–1	Dulwich Hamlet (IL)	
Replay	Dulwich Hamlet (IL)	8–7	St Albans City (AL)	aet
	Tufnell Park (IL)	0–3	London Caledonians (IL)	
	Wath Athletic (Q10) (ML)	2–1	Alfreton Town (Q12) (CA)	
	Wellington St George's (Q8) (BC)	2–0	Tranmere Rovers (D3N)	
	Welton Rovers (Q23) (WL)	1–4	Bath City (Q24) (SL)	
	Wigan Borough (D3N)	4–0	Eccles United (Q6) (LC)	
	Worksop Town (ML)	4–2	Scunthorpe & Lindsey United (Q9) (ML)	

== Fifth qualifying round ==
The draw comprised forty-eight teams, the twenty-four victorious teams from the previous round together with one additional non-League team (Bishop Auckland), eleven teams from the Third Division South (Aberdare Athletic, Brentford, Bristol Rovers, Charlton Athletic, Gillingham, Merthyr Town, Newport County, Northampton Town, Norwich City, Reading and Swansea Town), nine from the Third Division North (Accrington Stanley, Ashington, Darlington, Grimsby Town, Hartlepools United, Southport, Stalybridge Celtic, Walsall and Wrexham) and three from the Football League Second Division (Coventry City, Port Vale and Stockport County).

The ties were on a wider regional basis than previously. They included four ties featuring only non-League clubs, eleven in which both clubs were from the Football League, and nine in which non-League and Football League clubs were paired together. In the latter group four non-League clubs were successful over Football League opposition: New Brighton of the Lancashire Combination were home victors over Second Division club Coventry City; Bath City of the Southern League playing away defeated Division Three South club Exeter City; and two clubs who joined the competition at the fourth qualifying round defeated Division Three North opposition: Blyth Spartans of the North Eastern League in a local derby playing at home defeated near neighbours Ashington (who two seasons previously had been members of the same league); and Worksop Town of the Midland League won away at Grimsby Town F.C.|Grimsby Town. Neither of the other two Second Division clubs survived, both defeated by Division Three North clubs: Port Vale playing at home lost to Wrexham and Stockport County lost away at Barrow. Qualifying club Higham Ferrers exited the competition in this round having played eleven live and one void matches over the six rounds in which they played. Also eliminated, by Walsall, were Wellington St George's, the final team remaining in the competition to have played in the extra preliminary round.

From the twenty-four ties eight non-League clubs (including four from the qualifying divisions), nine clubs from the Third Division North and seven from the Third Division South progressed into the next round.

Tie	Home team	Score	Away team	Note
	Aberdare Athletic (D3S)	1–1	Newport County (D3S)	
Replay	Newport County (D3S)	1–1	Aberdare Athletic (D3S)	aet
Replay 2	Aberdare Athletic (D3S)	2–1	Newport County (D3S)	@Cardiff
	Accrington Stanley (D3N)	1–1	Halifax Town (D3N)	
Replay	Halifax Town (D3N)	1–0	Accrington Stanley (D3N)	
	Barrow (D3N)	3–2	Stockport County (D2)	
	Bishop Auckland (NL)	1–2	Darlington (D3N)	
	Blyth Spartans (NEL)	2–1	Ashington (D3N)	
	Carlisle United (NEL)	6–0	Felling Colliery (Q1) (NA)	
	Charlton Athletic (D3S)	2–0	Northampton Town (D3S)	
	Chesterfield (D3N)	4–4	Higham Ferrers Town (Q15) (NoL)	
Replay	Higham Ferrers Town (Q15) (NoL)	0–1	Chesterfield (D3N)	
	Dulwich Hamlet (IL)	2–2	Clapton (Q17) (IL)	
Replay	Clapton (Q17) (IL)	2–0	Dulwich Hamlet (IL)	
	Durham City (D3N)	0–1	Hartlepools United (D3N)	
	Exeter City (D3S)	1–2	Bath City (Q24) (SL)	
	Grimsby Town (D3N)	0–2	Worksop Town (ML)	
	Ilford (IL)	6–1	Chesham United (Q19) (SpL)	
	London Caledonians (IL)	1–2	Gillingham (D3S)	
	Maidstone United (KL)	0–0	Brentford (D3S)	
Replay	Brentford (D3S)	4–0	Maidstone United (KL)	
	Mansfield Town (Q13) (ML)	1–0	Wath Athletic (Q10) (ML)	
	Merthyr Town (D3S)	0–0	Swansea Town (D3S)	
Replay	Swansea Town (D3S)	0–1	Merthyr Town (D3S)	
	New Brighton (Q7) (LC)	3–0	Coventry City (D2)	
	Port Vale (D2)	0–2	Wrexham (D3N)	
	Reading (D3S)	0–1	Bristol Rovers (D3S)	
	Southend United (D3S)	2–2	Norwich City (D3S)	
Replay	Norwich City (D3S)	2–1	Southend United (D3S)	
	Southport (D3N)	1–1	Wigan Borough (D3N)	
Replay	Wigan Borough (D3N)	3–1	Southport (D3N)	
	Stalybridge Celtic (D3N)	1–0	Nelson (D3N)	
	Wellington St George's (Q8) (BC)	0–5	Walsall (D3N)	

== Sixth qualifying round ==
The draw comprised the twenty-four victorious teams from the previous round – eight non-League clubs (including four from the qualifying divisions), nine clubs from the Third Division North and seven from the Third Division South – who were drawn into twelve ties which were no longer regionally based.

One tie featured only non-League clubs; in this New Brighton of the Lancashire Combination, who had come through from the preliminary round and accounted for Football League clubs (Crewe Alexandra and Coventry City) in the previous two rounds, defeated Isthmian League club Clapton who had progressed from the first qualifying round. There were six ties involving pairings of non-League and Football League clubs, from which three non-League clubs progressed: Southern League club Bath City, a survivor from the preliminary round triumphed in a home replay over Barrow; Blyth Spartans of the North Eastern League who entered the competition at the fourth qualifying round journeyed to Kent and were victors over Gillingham of Division Three South; Midland League members Worksop Town, who had similarly commenced their campaign at the fourth qualifying round won a home tie beating Chesterfield. The remaining five ties were all contested by Football League clubs.

From the twelve ties in addition to the four non-League clubs (Blyth Spartans, Worksop Town, New Brighton and Bath City – the latter two from the qualifying divisions), four clubs each from the Third Division North (Halifax Town, Stalybridge Celtic, Wigan Borough and Wrexham) and the Third Division South (Aberdare Athletic, Charlton Athletic, Merthyr Town and Norwich City) progressed into the first round proper. The four non-League clubs were all eliminated in the next round.

Tie	Home team	Score	Away team	Note
	Aberdare Athletic (D3S)	0–0	Carlisle United (NEL)	
Replay	Carlisle United (NEL)	1–2	Aberdare Athletic (D3S)	aet
	Barrow (D3N)	2–2	Bath City (Q24) (SL)	
Replay	Bath City (Q24) (SL)	2–0	Barrow (D3N)	
	Brentford (D3S)	0–1	Merthyr Town (D3S)	
	Charlton Athletic (D3S)	2–1	Darlington (D3N)	
	Gillingham (D3S)	1–4	Blyth Spartans (NEL)	
	Mansfield Town (Q13) (ML)	0–2	Halifax Town (D3N)	
	New Brighton (Q7) (LC)	1–0	Clapton (Q17) (IL)	
	Norwich City (D3S)	5–1	Ilford (IL)	
	Stalybridge Celtic (D3N)	0–0	Bristol Rovers (D3S)	
Replay	Bristol Rovers (D3S)	1–2	Stalybridge Celtic (D3N)	
	Walsall (D3N)	1–3	Wigan Borough (D3N)	
	Worksop Town (ML)	1–0	Chesterfield (D3N)	
	Wrexham (D3N)	1–0	Hartlepools United (D3N)	

== 1922–23 FA Cup ==
See 1922–23 FA Cup for details of the rounds from the first round proper onwards.
