= Sheffield & Hallamshire Saturday Cup =

- Founded: 2002
- Current champions: Jubilee Sports
- Most championships: Stocksbridge Park Steels reserves (3 titles)

The Sheffield & Hallamshire Saturday Cup is a county cup competition involving teams within the Sheffield & Hallamshire County Football Association (S&HCFA).

Inaugurated in 2003 as the Association Cup, it is generally open to S&HCFA teams at levels 12-14 of the English football league system, although reserves teams at level 11 also compete. It is the second most important S&HCFA county cup, behind the Senior Cup. In 2023 the competition was renamed from the Association Cup to the Saturday Cup.

== Finals ==
| Season | Winner | Result | Runner-up | Venue | Notes |
|---|---|---|---|---|---|
| 2002–03 | Elm Tree | 1–0 | Stocksbridge Park Steels reserves | Belle Vue | |
| 2003–04 | HSBC | 3–2 | Athersley Recreation | Belle Vue | |
| 2004–05 | Kiveton Park | 2–2 | Athersley Recreation | Sandy Lane | Kiveton Park won on penalties |
| 2005–06 | Kiveton Park | 5–0 | Sheffield Lane Top | Belle Vue | |
| 2006–07 | Stocksbridge Park Steels reserves | 3–1 | Hemsworth Miners Welfare | Millmoor | |
| 2007–08 | Athersley Recreation | 1–0 | Hollinsend Amateurs | Oakwell | |
| 2008–09 | Hall Green United | 2–1 | Kirkburton | Keepmoat Stadium (pitch 2) | |
| 2009–10 | Sheffield reserves | 2–1 | Dearne Community & Miners Welfare | Inkersall Road | |
| 2010–11 | Stocksbridge Park Steels reserves | 3–0 | Kirkburton | Roundwood Sports Complex | |
| 2011–12 | Shaw Lane Aquaforce | 3–1 | Shepley | Sandy Lane | |
| 2012–13 | Swinton Athletic | 3–0 | Kirkburton | Sandy Lane | |
| 2013–14 | Jubilee Sports | 4–0 | Wickersley | Sandy Lane | |
| 2014–15 | Denaby Main | 2–0 | AFC Emley development | Sandy Lane | |
| 2015–16 | Handsworth Parramore reserves | 5–2 | Grimethorpe Sports | Memorial Ground | |
| 2016–17 | Dodworth Miners Welfare | 2–2 | Penistone Church reserves | Welfare Ground | Dodworth Miners Welfare won on penalties |
| 2017–18 | Penistone Church reserves | 2–0 | High Green Villa | Roundwood Sports Complex | |
| 2018–19 | Penistone Church reserves | 5–0 | Denaby Main | Hillsborough | |
| 2021–22 | South Elmsall United Services | 4–1 | AFC Dronfield | Keepmoat Stadium | |
| 2022–23 | Jubilee Sports | 2–1 | AFC Dronfield | Oxford Street | |
| 2023–24 | Stocksbridge Park Steels reserves | 3–1 | Caribbean Sports | Oxford Street | |

=== Winners ===
Bold indicates club is still (2022) active.

- 3 wins - **Stocksbridge Park Steels reserves**
- 2 wins - **Jubilee Sports**, **Kiveton Park**, **Penistone Church reserves**
- 1 win - Elm Tree, HSBC, **Athersley Recreation**, **Hall Green United**, **Sheffield reserves**, Shaw Lane Aquaforce, **Swinton Athletic**, **Denaby Main**, Handsworth Parramore reserves, **Dodworth Miners Welfare**, **South Elmsall United Services**

== See also ==
- Sheffield & Hallamshire Senior Cup
- Sheffield & Hallamshire Junior Cup
- Sheffield & Hallamshire County Senior League
