= 1914–15 Manchester United F.C. season =

English football club season

Manchester United
1914–15 season
- Chairman: John Henry Davies
- Manager: Jack Robson
- First Division: 18th
- FA Cup: First round
- Top goalscorer: League: George Anderson (10); All: George Anderson (10)
- Highest home attendance: 20,000 (v. Manchester City, 5 September 1914)
- Lowest home attendance: 5,000 (v. Newcastle United, 28 November 1914)
- Average home league attendance: 13,262
Home colours	Away colours

The 1914–15 season was Manchester United's 23rd season in the Football League and eighth in the First Division.

During the season a match-fixing scandal occurred when a league match between Manchester United and Liverpool at Old Trafford on 2 April 1915 was fixed in United's favour, with players from both sides benefiting from bets placed upon the result. An investigation by the Football Association was launched and found that players from both sides had been involved in rigging the match: Sandy Turnbull, Arthur Whalley and Enoch West of United, and Jackie Sheldon, Tom Miller, Bob Pursell and Thomas Fairfoul of Liverpool; Sheldon was a former United player himself and was found to be the plot's ringleader.

This was also the last season before no competitive football was played between 1915 and 1919 due to the First World War.

== First Division ==
Date	Opponents	H / A	Result F–A	Scorers	Attendance
2 September 1914	Oldham Athletic	H	1–3	O'Connell	13,000
5 September 1914	Manchester City	H	0–0		20,000
12 September 1914	Bolton Wanderers	A	0–3		10,000
19 September 1914	Blackburn Rovers	H	2–0	West (2)	15,000
26 September 1914	Notts County	A	2–4	Turnbull, Wall	12,000
3 October 1914	Sunderland	H	3–0	Anderson, Stacey, West	16,000
10 October 1914	The Wednesday	A	0–1		19,000
17 October 1914	West Bromwich Albion	H	0–0		18,000
24 October 1914	Everton	A	2–4	Anderson, Wall	15,000
31 October 1914	Chelsea	H	2–2	Anderson, Hunter	15,000
7 November 1914	Bradford City	A	2–4	Hunter, West	12,000
14 November 1914	Burnley	H	0–2		12,000
21 November 1914	Tottenham Hotspur	A	0–2		12,000
28 November 1914	Newcastle United	H	1–0	West	5,000
5 December 1914	Middlesbrough	A	1–1	Anderson	7,000
12 December 1914	Sheffield United	H	1–2	Anderson	8,000
19 December 1914	Aston Villa	A	3–3	Norton (2), Anderson	10,000
26 December 1914	Liverpool	A	1–1	Stacey	25,000
1 January 1915	Bradford Park Avenue	H	1–2	Anderson	8,000
2 January 1915	Manchester City	A	1–1	West	30,000
16 January 1915	Bolton Wanderers	H	4–1	Potts (2), Stacey, Woodcock	8,000
23 January 1915	Blackburn Rovers	A	3–3	Woodcock (2), own goal	7,000
30 January 1915	Notts County	H	2–2	Potts, Stacey	7,000
6 February 1915	Sunderland	A	0–1		5,000
13 February 1915	The Wednesday	H	2–0	West, Woodcock	7,000
20 February 1915	West Bromwich Albion	A	0–0		10,000
27 February 1915	Everton	H	1–2	Woodcock	10,000
13 March 1915	Bradford City	H	1–0	Potts	14,000
20 March 1915	Burnley	A	0–3		12,000
27 March 1915	Tottenham Hotspur	H	1–1	Woodcock	15,000
2 April 1915	Liverpool	H	2–0	Anderson (2)	18,000
3 April 1915	Newcastle United	A	0–2		12,000
5 April 1915	Bradford Park Avenue	A	0–5		15,000
6 April 1915	Oldham Athletic	A	0–1		2,000
10 April 1915	Middlesbrough	H	2–2	O'Connell, Turnbull	15,000
17 April 1915	Sheffield United	A	1–3	West	14,000
19 April 1915	Chelsea	A	3–1	Norton, West, Woodcock	13,000
26 April 1915	Aston Villa	H	1–0	Anderson	8,000

Pos	Team	Pld	W	D	L	GF	GA	GAv	Pts	Relegation
16	Notts County	38	9	13	16	41	57	0.719	31	
17	Bolton Wanderers	38	11	8	19	68	84	0.810	30	
18	Manchester United	38	9	12	17	46	62	0.742	30	
19	Chelsea	38	8	13	17	51	65	0.785	29	
20	Tottenham Hotspur (R)	38	8	12	18	57	90	0.633	28	Relegation to the Second Division

Source: World Football
Rules for classification: 1) Points; 2) Goal average; 3) Goals scored
(R) Relegated

== FA Cup ==
Date	Round	Opponents	H / A	Result F–A	Scorers	Attendance
9 January 1915	First Round	The Wednesday	A	0–1		23,248

== See also ==
- 1915 British football betting scandal
