= Paddy Gray =

Paddy Gray may refer to:

- Paddy Gray (cricketer) (1892–1977), Australian cricketer
- Paddy Gray (footballer) (1872–?), Scottish footballer
