= Joe Norton =

Joe Norton may refer to:

- Joe Norton (footballer)
- Joe Norton (politician)
