= Frederick Gibson (footballer) =

English footballer

Personal information
- Date of birth: 18 June 1907
- Place of birth: Somercotes, England
- Position: Goalkeeper

Youth career
- Dinnington Main

Senior career*
Years	Team	Apps	(Gls)
?–1926	Frickley Colliery	?	(?)
1926–1932	Hull City	110	(0)
1932–1937	Middlesbrough	122	(0)
1937–1938	Bradford City	10	(0)
1938–1939	Boston United	?	(?)
- * Club domestic league appearances and goals

Frederick W. Gibson (born 1907) was an English professional footballer who played as a goalkeeper.

== Career ==
Born in Somercotes, Gibson played for Dinnington Main, Frickley Colliery, Hull City, Middlesbrough, Bradford City and Boston United. In the 1929–1930 season he replaced the injured George Maddison in the Hull City goal, helping Hull to a semi-final replay in the FA Cup, losing narrowly to eventual winners, Arsenal. For Hull City he made over 100 Football League and FA Cup appearances, plus many more in the Midland League. For Middlesbrough he made over 100 appearances, including in the First Division. For Bradford City he made 10 appearances in the Football League.

== Sources ==
- Frost, Terry (1988). Bradford City A Complete Record 1903-1988. Breedon Books Sport. ISBN 0-907969-38-0.
