= Sheffield & Hallamshire Junior Shield =

- Founded: 1959
- Abolished: 1991

The Sheffield & Hallamshire Junior Shield was a county cup competition organised by the Sheffield & Hallamshire County Football Association from 1959 to 1990.

The competition was organised for those clubs who felt they had little chance of winning the Sheffield & Hallamshire Junior Cup.

== Finals ==
Season	Winner	Score	Runner-up	Venue	Notes
1959–60	Brodsworth Miners Welfare	–			
1960–61	Emley	–			
1961–62	Highfields Athletic	–			
1962–63	Wharncliffe Woodmoor Sports	–			
1963–64	Darton Welfare	2–1	Oughtibridge		
1964–65	Wombwell Main Welfare	3–2	Cartworth Moor	Stocksbridge Works	
1965–66	Grimethorpe Ex-Servicemens	–			
1966–67	Brinsworth Athletic	–			
1967–68	Northcliffe WMC	–			
1968–69	Barugh Green Sports	–			
1969–70	Kirkburton	–			
1970–71	Maltby Youth Club	–			
1971–72	Walton Colliery	–			
1972–73	Mexborough Miners Welfare	–			
1973–74	Hemsworth West End	–			
1974–75	Hemsworth Saint Patricks	7–5	a.e.t.		
1975–76	Upperthong S.C.	–			
1976–77	Royal George	–			
1977–78	Steetley Sports	–	Woodsetts Welfare Sports		
1978–79	Hall Green United	–			
1979–80	Grange Moor WMC	–			
1980–81	Worksop Borough	–			
1981–82	Woodsetts Welfare Sports	–			
1982–83	Hemsworth Saint Patricks	1–0			
1983–84	Station Hotel (Rossington)	–			
1984–85	Kexbrough Social	–			
1985–86	Blackstock	–			
1986–87	Blackstock	–			
1987–88	Ring O Bells	2–1	Toll Bar Central	Stocksbridge	
1988–89	Industry Inn	–			
1989–90	Unstone Athletic	–			
1990–91	New Mill WMC	3–1	Marsh Lane Eckington	Worsbrough	

== See also ==
- Sheffield & Hallamshire County Cup
- Sheffield & Hallamshire County Senior League
- Sheffield & Hallamshire Senior Cup
- Sheffield & Hallamshire Association Cup
- Sheffield & Hallamshire Junior Cup
