= Vincent Kenny =

Vincent Kenny is the name of:

- Vincent Kenny (footballer), English footballer for Sheffield Wednesday and Carlisle United
- Vincent Raymond Kenny, American postal administrator
