= John Addenbrooke =

John Addenbrooke may refer to:

- John Addenbrooke (philanthropist) (1680–1719), English medical doctor and founder of Addenbrooke's Hospital
- John Addenbrooke (priest) (c. 1691–1776), Dean of Lichfield
- John Addenbrooke (footballer) (1900–1961), English footballer
