= Joseph North =

Joseph North or Joe North may refer to:

== Sportspeople ==
- Joe North, English footballer
- Joseph North (soccer) in 2006 PDL season

== Others ==
- Joseph North (judge), connected to Martha Ballard
- Joseph North (actor) in Ladies Should Listen
- Joe North, character in Adventures of a Taxi Driver
- Joseph North (writer) (1904–1976), American journalist and magazine editor
