= Roundel F.C. =

Roundel
- Full name: Roundel Football Club
- Dissolved: 1903
- Ground: Staniforth Road

Roundel F.C. was a football club based in Darnall, South Yorkshire in England

== History ==
The club competed in the FA Cup in the early 1900s.

=== League and cup history ===
Roundel League and Cup history
Season	Division	Position	FA Cup
1899–1900	Hatchard League	*	-
1900–01	Hatchard League		-
1901–02	Sheffield Association League		2nd qualifying round
1902–03	Sheffield Association League		-
1903–04	Sheffield Association League	Withdrew	Extra preliminary round

* League play-off winners

== Honours ==
=== League ===
- Hatchard League
  - Champions: 1899–1900, 1901–02

=== Cup ===
- Sheffield & Hallamshire Senior Cup
  - Runners-up: 1902–03

== Records ==
- Best FA Cup performance: Second qualifying round, 1901–02
