= Joe Wigmore =

English footballer

Personal information
- Date of birth: 1891
- Place of birth: Kiveton Park, England
- Date of death: 1949 (aged 57–58)
- Position: Outside left

Senior career*
Years	Team	Apps	(Gls)
–1910	Dinnington Main		
1910–1911	Glossop	0	(0)
1911–1912	Blackpool	0	(0)
1912–1913	Huddersfield Town	1	(0)
1921–1922	Kiveton Park		
- * Club domestic league appearances and goals

Joe Wigmore was an English professional footballer. He played in the Football League for Huddersfield Town.
