= Rotherham Main F.C. =

Rotherham Main
- Full name: Rotherham Main Football Club

Rotherham Main F.C. was an English association football club based in Canklow, Rotherham, South Yorkshire.

== History ==
Little is known of the club other than that it competed in the FA Cup in the 1900s season.

=== League and cup history ===
Rotherham Main League and Cup history
Season	Division	Position	FA Cup
1903–04	Hatchard League	4th/11*	-
1904–05	Hatchard League	/13	-
1905–06	Sheffield Association League		1st qualifying round
1906–07	Sheffield Association League		Preliminary round
1907–08	Sheffield Association League		1st qualifying round
1908–09	Sheffield Association League	/9	Preliminary round

* League play-off winner

== Honours ==
=== League ===
- Hatchard League
  - Champions: 1903–04

=== Cup ===
- Aston-cum-Aughton Charity Cup
  - Runners-up: 1902–03

== Records ==
- Best FA Cup performance: 1st qualifying round, 1905–06, 1907–08
