= Thorpe Hesley F.C. =

Thorpe Hesley
- Full name: Thorpe Hesley Football Club
- Dissolved: 1911

Thorpe Hesley F.C. were an English football club based in Thorpe Hesley, Rotherham, West Riding of Yorkshire.

== History ==
Thorpe Hesley were formed around the turn of the 20th century, initially joining the Hatchard League. They made their FA Cup debut in 1904, reaching the 2nd qualifying round, an achievement they equaled in 1906 (being disqualified after a replay with Hoyland Town). The club disbanded in 1911.

=== League and cup history ===
Thorpe Hesley league and cup history
Season	Division	Level	Position	FA Cup
1902–03	Hatchard League		**	-
1903–04	Sheffield Association League		7th/14	-
1904–05	Hatchard League			2nd qualifying round
1905–06	Hatchard League			1st qualifying round
1906–07	Hatchard League		**	2nd qualifying round
1907–08	Hatchard League		*	preliminary round
1908–09	Hatchard League		*	1st qualifying round
1909–10	Hatchard League			preliminary round
1910–11	Sheffield Minor League			preliminary round

* League play-off winners
** League play-off runners-up

=== Notable former players ===
Those who played in the Football League before or after playing for Thorpe Hesley include George Stacey, Bert Cook and Bernard Wilkinson.

== Honours ==
- Hatchard League: 1907–08, 1908–09
