= Jack Wilkinson (footballer, born 1902) =

English footballer

Personal information
- Full name: John Wilkinson
- Date of birth: 13 June 1902
- Place of birth: Wath-upon-Dearne, Yorkshire, England
- Date of death: April 1979 (aged 76)
- Position: Outside left

Senior career*
Years	Team	Apps	(Gls)
- Dearne Valley Old Boys
- Wath Athletic
1925–1930	Sheffield Wednesday	72	(16)
1930–1932	Newcastle United	30	(7)
1932–1935	Lincoln City	93	(19)
1935–1936	Sunderland	0	(0)
1936–1937	Hull City	17	(2)
1937–19??	Scunthorpe & Lindsey United		
- * Club domestic league appearances and goals

John Wilkinson (13 June 1902 – April 1979) was an English footballer who scored 44 goals in 212 appearances in the Football League playing for Sheffield Wednesday, Newcastle United, Lincoln City and Hull City. He then moved into non-league football with Scunthorpe & Lindsey United. He played as an outside left.
