= Ernest Jackson (footballer) =

English footballer

Personal information
- Date of birth: 11 June 1914
- Place of birth: Sheffield, England
- Date of death: 1996 (aged 81–82)
- Height: 5 ft 9 in (1.75 m)
- Position: Right half

Youth career
- Atlas & Norfolk Works

Senior career*
Years	Team	Apps	(Gls)
1930	Sheffield Wednesday	0	(0)
1930	Grimsby Town (trial)	0	(0)
1932–1948	Sheffield United	229	(8)
Total		229	(8)
- * Club domestic league appearances and goals

Ernest Jackson (11 June 1914 – 1996) was an English footballer. He played as a right half.

Jackson joined Sheffield United from local amateur side Atlas & Norfolk Works in 1932. He started in the third team, but within two years, he made his debut in a First Division match against Wolverhampton Wanderers at Bramall Lane on 11 February 1933.

He did not win a regular place in the side until 1936, and, but for World War II, would have enjoyed twelve full season for the side. He resumed his playing career with Sheffield United after the war in 1946, and retired a few years later. In total he made 229 appearances for Sheffield United with 8 goals.

== Honours ==
Sheffield United

- FA Cup runner-up: 1935–36
