= Jack Angus (footballer, born 1909) =

English footballer

Personal information
- Date of birth: 12 March 1909
- Place of birth: Amble, England
- Date of death: 1965 (aged 55–56)
- Height: 5 ft 10 in (1.78 m)
- Position: Defender

Senior career*
Years	Team	Apps	(Gls)
- Amble Welfare
1928	Wolverhampton Wanderers	0	(0)
- Wath Athletic
- Scunthorpe & Lindsey United
1930–1947	Exeter City	249	(1)
- Sidmouth
- * Club domestic league appearances and goals

Jack Angus (12 March 1909 – 1965) was a footballer who played in the Football League for Exeter City. He spent all his professional career at Exeter becoming a one-club man.
