= George Hunter (footballer, born 1885) =

English footballer

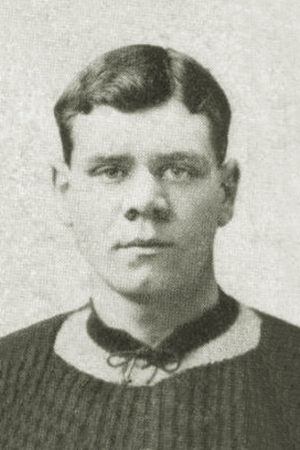
- Hunter with Aston Villa in 1910

Personal information
- Full name: George Charles Hunter
- Date of birth: 2 June 1885
- Place of birth: Nowshera, Punjab, British India (present-day Khyber Pakhtunkhwa, Pakistan)
- Date of death: 20 January 1934 (aged 48)
- Place of death: Lambeth, England
- Height: 5 ft 7 1/2 in (1.71 m)
- Position: Half back

Senior career*
Years	Team	Apps	(Gls)
- Maidstone United
1907–1908	Croydon Common	13	(1)
1908–1912	Aston Villa	91	(1)
1912–1913	Oldham Athletic	40	(1)
1913–1914	Chelsea	30	(2)
1914–1915	Manchester United	22	(2)
1915–1916	→ Croydon Common (wartime)	18	(3)
1916–1917	→ Southampton (wartime)	17	(0)
1916–1918	→ Brentford (wartime)	18	(0)
1918–1919	→ Birmingham (wartime)	21	(2)
1919	Portsmouth	8	(0)

International career
	The Football League XI	2	(0)
- * Club domestic league appearances and goals

George Charles Hunter, also known by his nickname Cocky, (born 2 June 1885 – 20 January 1934) was an English professional footballer who played as a half back in the Football League for Aston Villa, Oldham Athletic, Chelsea and Manchester United.

== Early life ==
Born in Nowshera, Peshawar, British India (now Khyber Pakhtunkhwa region of Pakistan).

== Playing career ==
Hunter played for Aston Villa, Oldham Athletic and Chelsea during his early career.

He was the first Aston Villa player to be sent off in a match. The second player, Cyril Spiers, would be dismissed 12 years later in the 1925–26 season.

In March 1914, he transferred to Manchester United. He captained the club during the 1914–15 season and stayed with United until January 1915, when his contract was cancelled due to a training ground incident. He then played for Croydon Common, Southampton, Brentford and Birmingham as a guest player during the First World War and finished his career with Portsmouth of the Southern League during the 1919–20 season.

Hunter made two appearances for The Football League XI.

== Military service ==
Hunter joined the Queen's Own Royal West Kent Regiment of the British Army in December 1903, rising through the ranks to lance corporal by February 1906. He briefly served in Malta, but was found guilty of theft and receiving stolen goods by court-martial in December 1906 and served 140 days hard labour before being discharged in May 1907.

Over a year after the outbreak of the First World War in August 1914, Hunter enlisted in the Royal Sussex Regiment in September 1915 and served in the 10th (Reserve) Battalion of the regiment until June 1916. He was sent to France to join the 9th (Service) Battalion in August 1916, but bouts of dysentery saw him posted back to Britain as a fitness instructor. He was demobilised after the Armistice with Germany in November 1918.

== Personal life ==
After his retirement from football, Hunter worked as a sports writer.

Hunter died on 20 January 1934 in Lambeth, London.

== Career statistics ==
Appearances and goals by club, season and competition
Club	Season	League			FA Cup		Total	
Club	Season	Division	Apps	Goals	Apps	Goals	Apps	Goals
Croydon Common	1907–08	Southern League Second Division	13	1	1	0	14	1
Aston Villa	1908–09	First Division	15	0	1	0	16	0
Aston Villa	1909–10	First Division	32	1	3	0	35	1
Aston Villa	1910–11	First Division	33	0	2	0	35	0
Aston Villa	1911–12	First Division	11	0	—		11	0
Aston Villa	Total		91	1	6	0	97	1
Oldham Athletic	1911–12	First Division	17	1	2	0	19	1
Oldham Athletic	1912–13	First Division	23	0	4	0	27	0
Oldham Athletic	Total		40	1	6	0	46	1
Chelsea	1912–13	First Division	11	1	—		11	1
Chelsea	1913–14	First Division	19	1	2	0	21	1
Chelsea	Total		30	2	2	0	32	2
Manchester United	1913–14	First Division	7	0	—		7	0
Manchester United	1914–15	First Division	15	2	1	0	16	2
Manchester United	Total		22	2	1	0	23	2
Portsmouth	1919–20	Southern League First Division	8	0	0	0	8	0
Career total			204	7	16	0	220	7

Sporting positions
Preceded by George Stacey	Manchester United captain 1914–1915	Succeeded by Patrick O'Connell
