= Nether Edge Amateurs F.C. =

Nether Edge Amateurs
- Full name: Nether Edge Amateurs Football Club
- Founded: 1906
- Dissolved: 1939

Nether Edge Amateurs F.C. was an English association football club from Sheffield, South Yorkshire. The club competed in the FA Amateur Cup between 1908 and 1934, and won the Sheffield & Hallamshire Junior Cup in 1915 and 1923
