= Wath Athletic F.C. =

Wath Athletic
- Full name: Wath Athletic Football Club
- Founded: 1878 (as Wath)
- Dissolved: 1934
- Ground: Athletic Ground
Home colours

Wath Athletic F.C. was an English football club based in Wath-upon-Dearne, South Yorkshire.

== History ==
The earliest mentions of the club – under the name Wath F.C. – date from 1878, although the club's appearances were intermittent until the club moved into a higher standard of football in the late 1880s, entering the Hallamshire League in 1891. They played in local Sheffield leagues and entered the FA Cup for the first time in 1893 (as Wath-upon-Dearne), and had one abortive (and unsuccessful) season as a professional club in 1896–97, before changing their name to Wath Athletic in 1899. This name change reflected their move to the new Athletic Ground in the village.

In 1904 the club ceased entering competitions, due to a deficit over the season of £9, but returned again three years later and rejoined the Sheffield Association League, winning the league title at the first time of asking in 1908. They won the Association League on a further three occasions before the First World War, and when hostilities ended Wath joined the Yorkshire League, though only for the 1920–21 season.

In the summer of 1921 Athletic were admitted into the Midland League, and they would spend a total of nine seasons in the competition. Although their highest league finish (fourth) came in 1926–27, they had arguably their most successful season a year earlier when they reached the 1st round of the FA Cup for the only time, losing 0–5 to Chesterfield, before winning the Sheffield & Hallamshire Senior Cup for the first time after losing the final in 1897.

They left the Midland League in 1930 after finishing bottom of the 26 team table, returning to the Association League. They won the Association League again in 1932 but the club fell on hard times - the club lost £90 over 1932–33, with an average gate take of £4 - and the last recorded fixture for the club was in December 1934.

== Colours ==
As Wath F.C., the club wore red and white. By at least 1908 the club had changed to white shirts, black shorts, and black socks. In January 1923, the club adopted a distinctive white shirt with blue "necklet" and white shorts, and by 1927 the club had blue and white shirts, with white as a change kit.

== Notable former players ==
Players that have played in the Football League either before or after playing for Wath Athletic –

- John Addenbrooke
- Jack Angus
- Eric Brook
- Walter Moore
- Albert Pape
- Bernard Radford
- Pip Rippon
- Harold Watson
- Jack Wilkinson
- John (Jack) Ball

== League and cup history ==
Wath Athletic League and Cup history
Season	Division	Position	FA Cup
1891–92	Hallamshire League	2nd/8	-
1892–93	Sheffield & District League	9th/14	-
1893–94	Sheffield & District League Division 2	3rd/5	2nd qualifying round
1894–95	Wharncliffe Charity Cup Shield North Division	1st/5	2nd qualifying round
1895–96	Sheffield Challenge Cup League		1st qualifying round
1896–97	Sheffield Association League		3rd qualifying round
1897–98	Sheffield Association League		2nd qualifying round
1898–99	Sheffield Association League		2nd qualifying round
1899–1900	Sheffield Association League Division 1		1st qualifying round
1900–01	Sheffield Association League		2nd qualifying round
1901–02	Sheffield Association League		2nd qualifying round
1902–03	Sheffield Association League	3rd	-
1903–04	Sheffield Association League		Preliminary round
1907–08	Sheffield Association League	1st	2nd qualifying round
1908–09	Sheffield Association League		3rd qualifying round
1909–10	Sheffield Association League		1st qualifying round
1910–11	Sheffield Association League	1st	2nd qualifying round
1911–12	Sheffield Association League	1st	1st qualifying round
1912–13	Sheffield Association League	1st	1st qualifying round
1913–14			2nd qualifying round
1914–15			2nd qualifying round
1919–20			Preliminary round
1920–21	Yorkshire League	3rd/13	Preliminary round
1921–22	Midland League	18th/22	Preliminary round
1922–23	Midland League	7th/22	5th qualifying round
1923–24	Midland League	17th/22	1st qualifying round
1924–25	Midland League	10th/15	1st qualifying round
1925–26	Midland League	6th/21	1st round
1926–27	Midland League	4th/20	3rd qualifying round
1927–28	Midland League	6th/23	1st qualifying round
1928–29	Midland League	19th/26	Preliminary round
1929–30	Midland League	26th/26	1st qualifying round
1930–31			Preliminary round
1931–32	Sheffield Association League	1st	2nd qualifying round
1932–33			2nd qualifying round
1933–34			Preliminary round
1934–35			Extra preliminary round

== Honours ==
=== League ===
- Sheffield Association League
  - Champions (5): 1907–08, 1910–11, 1911–12, 1912–13, 1931–32

=== Cup ===
- Sheffield & Hallamshire Senior Cup
  - Winners: 1925–26
  - Runners-up: 1896–97

== Records ==
- Best league performance, 4th, Midland League, 1926–27
- Best FA Cup performance: 1st round, 1925–26
