= Arthur Potts (footballer) =

English footballer

Personal information
- Full name: Arthur Potts
- Date of birth: 26 May 1888
- Place of birth: Cannock, England
- Date of death: January 1981 (aged 92)
- Place of death: Walsall, England
- Height: 5 ft 7 in (1.70 m)
- Position: Inside forward

Senior career*
Years	Team	Apps	(Gls)
- Willenhall Pickwick
1910–1912	Hednesford Town		
1912–1913	Willenhall Swifts		
1913–1920	Manchester United	27	(5)
1920–1922	Wolverhampton Wanderers	35	(9)
1922–1923	Walsall	1	(0)
- Bloxwich Strollers
1924–	Dudley Town		
–1931	Red, White & Blue		
- * Club domestic league appearances and goals

Arthur Potts (26 May 1888 – January 1981) was an English professional footballer who played as an inside forward in the Football League for Wolverhampton Wanderers, Manchester United and Walsall.

== Personal life ==
Potts served in the Manchester Regiment during the First World War. He later became a publican and ran the Blue Ball pub on Pipers Row, Wolverhampton.

== Career statistics ==
Appearances and goals by club, season and competition
Club	Season	League			FA Cup		Total	
Club	Season	Division	Apps	Goals	Apps	Goals	Apps	Goals
Manchester United	1913–14	First Division	6	1	0	0	6	1
Manchester United	1914–15	First Division	17	4	1	0	18	4
Manchester United	1919–20	First Division	4	0	1	0	5	0
Manchester United	Total		27	5	2	0	39	5
Wolverhampton Wanderers	1920–21	Second Division	28	9	7	1	35	10
Wolverhampton Wanderers	1921–22	Second Division	7	0	0	0	7	0
Wolverhampton Wanderers	Total		35	9	7	1	42	10
Walsall	1922–23	Third Division North	1	0	0	0	1	0
Career total			63	14	9	1	72	15

== Honours ==
Wolverhampton Wanderers

- FA Cup runner-up: 1920–21
