= Yorkshire Water Authority (Southern) F.C. =

Yorkshire Water Authority (Southern)
- Full name: Yorkshire Water Authority (Southern) Football Club
- Founded: (as Sheffield Waterworks)

Yorkshire Water Authority (Southern) F.C. was an English football club based in Sheffield, South Yorkshire.

== History ==
The club, formed as Sheffield Waterworks, joined the Yorkshire Football League in 1970, and spent eleven seasons in the competition - all of them in the bottom Third Division. For their last season they were renamed Yorkshire Water Authority (Southern). They saved their best league finish for their last season, when finishing 3rd.

=== League and cup history ===
Yorkshire Water Authority (Southern) League and Cup history
| Season | Division | Position |
|---|---|---|
| 1966–67 | Hatchard League | 1st/ |
| 1967–68 | Sheffield Association League Division 2 | 1st/ |
| 1968–69 | Sheffield Association League Division 1 | 1st/ |
| 1969–70 | Sheffield Association League Division 1 | |
| 1970–71 | Yorkshire League Division 3 | 15th/15 |
| 1971–72 | Yorkshire League Division 3 | 14th/14 |
| 1972–73 | Yorkshire League Division 3 | 11th/16 |
| 1973–74 | Yorkshire League Division 3 | 9th/16 |
| 1974–75 | Yorkshire League Division 3 | 13th/16 |
| 1975–76 | Yorkshire League Division 3 | 11th/16 |
| 1976–77 | Yorkshire League Division 3 | 10th/16 |
| 1977–78 | Yorkshire League Division 3 | 5th/16 |
| 1978–79 | Yorkshire League Division 3 | 12th/15 |
| 1979–80 | Yorkshire League Division 3 | 12th/14 |
| 1980–81 | Yorkshire League Division 3 | 3rd/16 |
