= Paddy Gray (footballer) =

Scottish footballer

Personal information
- Full name: Patrick Gray
- Date of birth: 4 December 1872
- Place of birth: Partick, Scotland
- Position: Centre-half

Senior career*
Years	Team	Apps	(Gls)
1894–1895	Yoker Athletic		
1895–1897	Partick Thistle		
1897–1898	Liverpool	0	(0)
1898–1903	Grimsby Town	121	(5)
1903–1905	Fulham		
1905–1906	Leyton		
1906–1907	Burton United	21	(0)
1907–1909	Parkgate & Rawmarsh United		
1909–19??	Leyton		
- * Club domestic league appearances and goals

Patrick Gray (born 4 December 1872) was a Scottish professional footballer who played as a centre-half.
