= Fulwood F.C. =

Fulwood
- Full name: Fulwood Football Club
- Founded: (as Fulwood Church)

Fulwood F.C. was an English association football club from Sheffield, South Yorkshire. The club competed in the FA Amateur Cup during the 1930s, and won the Sheffield Amateur League in 1932
