= George Stacey (footballer) =

English footballer

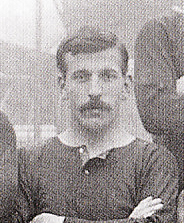

Personal information
- Full name: George William Stacey
- Date of birth: April 1881
- Place of birth: Thorpe Hesley, England
- Date of death: 1972 (aged 90–91)
- Place of death: Rotherham, England
- Position: Left back

Youth career
- ?–1902: Thorpe Hesley

Senior career*
Years	Team	Apps	(Gls)
1902–?	Sheffield Wednesday	?	(?)
?–1905	Thornhill United	?	(?)
1905–1907	Barnsley	?	(?)
1907–1919	Manchester United	241	(9)
- * Club domestic league appearances and goals

George William Stacey (April 1881 – 1972) was an English footballer who played at left back for several English football clubs, including Sheffield Wednesday, Barnsley and Manchester United.

Born in Thorpe Hesley, Rotherham, Stacey began his career with Thorpe Hesley F.C. before signing for Sheffield Wednesday in May 1902. He then joined Barnsley in August 1905, via a short spell with Thornhill United. In April 1907, he was sold to Manchester United for a fee of £200.

Stacey made his Manchester United debut on 12 October 1907, playing at left back in a 6–1 away win over Newcastle United. That season, he made 18 league appearances and scored one goal as United won the First Division title by nine points over Aston Villa - the first major trophy in Manchester United's history. The following year, Stacey played more regularly at right back, playing in 38 matches on the way to the 1909 FA Cup title. In 1910–11, United won the First Division again, albeit only by one point, with Stacey missing only two matches.

As a result of his consistency with Manchester United, Stacey went for a trial with the England national team in 1912. However, he never made an appearance for the team.

Stacey remained with Manchester United until the outbreak of the First World War forced the temporary cancellation of competitive football in England. During the war, Stacey made guest appearances for his hometown club, Rotherham County. He retired from football at the end of the 1918–19 War League season in May 1919.

He died in 1972 at the age of 91, and by this time he was one of Manchester United's last surviving players from their early successes.

== Honours ==
Manchester United

- First Division (2): 1907–08, 1910–11
- FA Cup (1): 1908–09

Sporting positions
Preceded by Charlie Roberts	Manchester United captain 1913–1914	Succeeded by George Hunter
