= Doncaster St. James F.C. =

Doncaster St. James
- Full name: Doncaster St. James Football Club

Doncaster St. James F.C. was an English association football club based in Doncaster, South Yorkshire.

== History ==
Little is known of the club other than that it competed in the FA Cup in the early twentieth century.

=== League and cup history ===
Doncaster St. James League and Cup history
Season	FA Cup
1907–08	1st qualifying round
1908–09	1st qualifying round
1909–10	1st qualifying round
1910–11	Preliminary round

== Records ==
- Best FA Cup performance: 1st qualifying round, 1907–08, 1908–09, 1909–10
