= Joe Norton (footballer) =

English footballer

Personal information
- Full name: Joseph Patrick Norton
- Date of birth: 26 January 1888
- Place of birth: Stoney Stanton, England
- Date of death: 1963 (aged 74–75)
- Place of death: Hinckley, England
- Height: 5 ft 6 in (1.68 m)
- Position: Outside forward

Senior career*
Years	Team	Apps	(Gls)
- Avondale
- Leicester British United
- Leicester Imperial
1910–1911	Atherstone Town		
1911–1912	Stockport County	8	(1)
1912–1913	Atherstone Town		
1913	Nuneaton Town	10	(2)
1913–1919	Manchester United	37	(3)
1915–1918	→ Nottingham Forest (guest)	27	(3)
1919–1920	Leicester City	11	(0)
1920–1922	Bristol Rovers	38	(2)
1922–1923	Swindon Town	26	(2)
1923–1924	Kettering		
1924	Atherstone Town		
1924–1925	Hinckley Town		
1925–1927	Ashby Town		
- Leicester Municipal Officers
- * Club domestic league appearances and goals

Joseph Patrick Norton (26 January 1888 – 1963) was an English professional footballer who played as an outside forward in the Football League for Stockport County, Manchester United, Leicester City, Bristol Rovers and Swindon Town.

== Personal life ==
During the First World War, Norton served as a private in the Leicester Town Rifles, which fought as part of the 46th (North Midland) Division. After retiring from football, he lived in Belgrave and worked for Leicester City Corporation.

== Career statistics ==
Appearances and goals by club, season and competition
Club	Season	League			FA Cup		Total	
Club	Season	Division	Apps	Goals	Apps	Goals	Apps	Goals
Stockport County	1911–12	Second Division	8	1	1	1	9	2
Manchester United	1913–14	First Division	8	0	0	0	8	0
Manchester United	1914–15	First Division	29	3	0	0	29	3
Manchester United	Total		37	3	0	0	37	3
Leicester City	1919–20	Second Division	11	0	1	0	12	0
Bristol Rovers	1920–21	Third Division South	13	1	1	1	14	2
Bristol Rovers	1921–22	Third Division South	25	1	0	0	25	1
Bristol Rovers	Total		38	2	1	1	39	3
Swindon Town	1922–23	Third Division South	26	2	1	0	27	2
Career total			120	7	4	1	124	8
