= Joe North =

English footballer

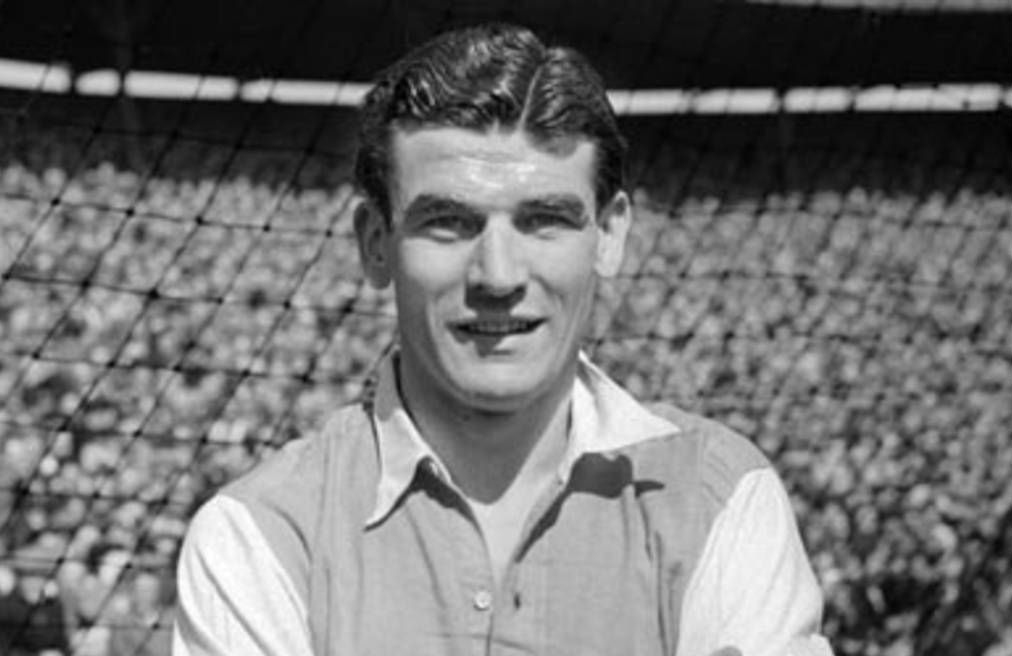

Personal information
- Full name: Ernest Joseph North
- Date of birth: 23 September 1895
- Place of birth: Burton-on-Trent, England
- Date of death: 24 August 1955 (aged 59)
- Place of death: Havant, England
- Height: 5 ft 9 1/2 in (1.77 m)
- Position: Centre forward

Senior career*
Years	Team	Apps	(Gls)
- Atlas & Norfolk Works
1914	Sheffield United	0	(0)
- Tank Corps
1919–1922	Arsenal	23	(6)
1922–1923	Reading	4	(0)
1923–1924	Gillingham	39	(11)
1924–1926	Norwich City	56	(19)
1926–19??	Watford	6	(0)
- Northfleet United
- * Club domestic league appearances and goals

Ernest Joseph North MM (23 September 1895 – 24 August 1955) was an English professional footballer. North, who played as a centre forward, played for Sheffield United, Arsenal, Reading, Gillingham, Norwich City, Watford and Northfleet United. He was also a professional cricketer for Middlesex.

== Career ==
North's early footballing career was interrupted by World War I, in which he enlisted and served as an acting sergeant in the Royal Engineers and the Machine Gun Corps and then as a lieutenant in the Tank Corps. North won the Military Medal during the conflict. During this time he also featured as a guest player for Sheffield United.

North joined Arsenal in 1919 as an amateur. A centre forward, he scored on his debut in a First Division match against Oldham Athletic on 7 February 1920. However, he was used mainly as backup for Henry White and Fred Pagnam, and made just 23 league appearances (scoring six goals) in three seasons before leaving Highbury for Reading in May 1922.

He later played for Watford, Norwich City and Gillingham. After retiring, he was briefly a coach at Northfleet United. He also played cricket for Middlesex and later became an umpire in the Minor Counties Championship.
