= John Addenbrooke (footballer) =

English footballer (1900–1961)

Personal information
- Full name: John Edwin Addenbrooke
- Date of birth: 4 January 1900
- Place of birth: Carbrook, Sheffield, England
- Date of death: 2 October 1961 (aged 61)
- Place of death: Sheffield, England
- Position: Forward

Senior career*
Years	Team	Apps	(Gls)
- Beighton
1924–1926	Chesterfield	21	(5)
–	Frickley Colliery		
–	Wath Athletic		
–	Tinsley Working Mens Club		
–	Fulwood		
- * Club domestic league appearances and goals

John Edwin Addenbrooke (4 January 1900 – 2 October 1961) was a footballer who played in the Football League for Chesterfield. He also played non-league football for Beighton, Frickley Colliery, Wath Athletic, Tinsley Working Mens Club and Fulwood.
