= Attercliffe Victory F.C. =

Attercliffe Victory
- Full name: Attercliffe Victory Football Club

Attercliffe Victory F.C. was an English association football club from Sheffield, South Yorkshire. The club competed in the FA Amateur Cup in 1926, a season after winning the Sheffield Amateur League
