= Malin Bridge Old Boys F.C. =

Malin Bridge Old Boys
- Full name: Malin Bridge Old Boys Football Club
- Dissolved: 1925

Malin Bridge Old Boys F.C. was an English association football club from Sheffield, South Yorkshire. The club competed in the FA Amateur Cup in 1921 and 1922, and won the Sheffield Amateur League in 1921 and 1925
