= Port Sunlight F.C. =

Former English association football club

Port Sunlight
- Full name: Port Sunlight Football Club
- Nickname: the Soapmen
- Founded: 1892
- Dissolved: 1985
- Ground: The Oval
colours

Port Sunlight Football Club was an English football club based in Port Sunlight, Metropolitan Borough of Wirral, Merseyside.

== History ==
The club played in West Cheshire Football League in the 1890s winning the title in 1894–95. They played in The Combination for the 1904–05 and 1905–06 seasons before moving to the Lancashire Combination for a single season.

In 1907, the club changed its name to Wirral United, but, after being unable to find a suitable ground, was forced to withdraw from the Lancashire Combination, to be replaced either by Turton or Ashton Town, depending on the former's place in the Lancashire Alliance. The club seems to have reverted back to its former name to play in the more local leagues.

After World War Two the club rejoined the West Cheshire Football League and were league champions a further four times and runners-up on five occasions. The club was forced to withdraw from the West Cheshire league in May 1985 and disbanded.

== Colours ==
The club originally wore blue shirts and white shorts, changing to blue and black by 1904, and adopting maroon jerseys in 1905. In 1906 the club changed again, to black and white striped shirts, and after the First World War it used white jerseys with black shorts and socks.

== Ground ==
The club played at the Lever Brothers Oval, on the Old Chester Road.

== Notable players ==
- Notable players ( 5 )

== Honours ==
- West Cheshire Football League Division One
  - Champions (5): 1894–95, 1946–47, 1950–51, 1972–73, 1973–74
  - Runners-up (5): 1952–53, 1963–64, 1964–65, 1974–75, 1981–82
- West Cheshire Football League Division Two
  - Champions (3): 1947–48 (reserves), 1951–52 (reserves), 1974–75 (reserves),
