= Hathersage F.C. =

Association football club in England

Hathersage
- Full name: Hathersage Football Club
- Founded: 1897
- Ground: Leadmill Ground, Hope S32 1BA
- Manager: Sean Owens
- League: Hope Valley Amateur League

Hathersage F.C. is an English association football club from Hathersage, Derbyshire. They play in the Hope Valley Amateur League.

== History ==
They entered the FA Amateur Cup in 1908, from 1912 to 1922 and from 1928 to 1929. and won the Sheffield Amateur League in 1907 and 1920.
