= Vince Kenny =

English footballer

Personal information
- Full name: Vincent Kenny
- Date of birth: 29 December 1924
- Place of birth: Sheffield, England
- Date of death: 2006 (aged 81–82)
- Place of death: Sheffield, England
- Position: Full back

Senior career*
Years	Team	Apps	(Gls)
- Atlas & Norfolk Works
1945–1955	Sheffield Wednesday	144	(0)
1955–1958	Carlisle United	112	(3)
Total		256	(3)
- * Club domestic league appearances and goals

Vincent Kenny (29 December 1924 – 2006) was an English professional footballer who played as a full back.

== Career ==
Born in Sheffield, Kenny played for Atlas & Norfolk Works, Sheffield Wednesday and Carlisle United.
