= Parkgate & Rawmarsh United F.C. =

Parkgate & Rawmarsh United
- Full name: Parkgate & Rawmarsh United Football Club

Parkgate & Rawmarsh United F.C. was an English association football club based in Parkgate, Rotherham, South Yorkshire.

== History ==
The club was formed in 1906, and played six seasons in the Sheffield Association League, as well as competing in the FA Cup on numerous occasions.

== Records ==
- Best FA Cup performance: 1st Qualifying Round, 1909–10
