= Penistone Church F.C. =

Association football club in England

Coordinates: 53.524°N 1.6245°W

Penistone Church
- Full name: Penistone Church Football Club
- Founded: 1906; 120 years ago
- Ground: Memorial Ground; Penistone; South Yorkshire
- Capacity: 1,000 (100 seats)
- Chairman: David Elliott
- Manager: Brett Lovell & John Whitehead
- League: Northern Counties East League Premier Division
- 2025–26: Northern Counties East League Premier Division, 13th of 20
- Website: www.penistonechurchfc.com
Home colours

Penistone Church Football Club is an English football club based in Penistone, Barnsley, South Yorkshire. Its first men's team plays in the Northern Counties East League Premier Division, at level 9 of the English football league system.

== First Men's Team History ==
In 1909 they were the first winners of the Sheffield & Hallamshire Junior Cup, winning the cup again in 1937.

In 1948 they were the first ever opponents of Sheffield Wednesday's youth team, in a Hatchard League fixture. When the Hatchard League merged with the Sheffield Association League, Penistone were founder members of the new Sheffield & Hallamshire County Senior League. They first reached the Premier Division in 1995 and were something of a yo-yo club during the 1990s, flitting between the Premier Division and Division One on numerous occasions.

They finished as Premier Division runners-up in 2003 but would later spend yet another year in Division One after relegation in 2007. They finally established themselves as one of the top sides in the league during the early 2010s, and in 2014 they were promoted to the Northern Counties East League Division One, having made their FA Vase debut against Rossington Main in 2013.

In 2016 they qualified for the inaugural Division One play-offs, but missed out on promotion to the Premier Division after losing their semi-final against AFC Emley, but a year later they beat the same opponents in a semi-final re-match before going on to beat Grimsby Borough in the final to win promotion to the Premier Division.

The club reached the final of the Sheffield & Hallamshire Senior Cup for the first time in 2018, losing 3–4 to Shaw Lane at Bramall Lane. The following season, Penistone only narrowly missed out on the NCEL Premier Division title, being pipped at the end by Worksop Town

== Women's team history ==
The club has multiple women and girls teams playing in the Sheffield and Hallamshire Women's and Girls League. Many of players have been through several age groups, developing their game in the same format as the mens' game.

== Season-by-season record ==
Season	Division	Level	Position	FA Cup	FA Amateur Cup	FA Vase	Notes
1906–07	Sheffield Junior League	-		-	-	-	
1907–08	Sheffield Amateur League	-	3rd/16	-	-	-	
1908–09	Sheffield Amateur League	-	1st/13	-	-	-	League champions (won play-off)
1909–10	Sheffield Amateur League	-		-	-	-	
1910–11	Sheffield Amateur League	-		-	-	-	League champions (won play-off)
1911–12	Sheffield Amateur League	-	2nd/12	-	-	-	
1912–13	Sheffield Amateur League	-	2nd/13	-	-	-	
1913–14	Sheffield Amateur League	-	4th/11	-	-	-	
1914–15	Sheffield Amateur League	-		-	-	-	
1915–16	Club did not enter any competitions due to World War I						
1916–17	Club did not enter any competitions due to World War I						
1917–18	Club did not enter any competitions due to World War I						
1918–19	Club did not enter any competitions due to World War I						
1919–20	Sheffield Amateur League	-		-	-	-	
1920–21	Sheffield Amateur League	-		-	-	-	
1921–22	Sheffield Amateur League	-	7th/11	-	-	-	
1922–23	Sheffield Amateur League	-		-	-	-	
1923–24	Sheffield Amateur League	-	13th/14	-	-	-	
1924–25	Penistone & District League	-		-	-	-	
1925–26	Sheffield Amateur League	-		-	-	-	
1926–27	Sheffield Amateur League	-		-	-	-	
1927–28	Sheffield Amateur League	-		-	-	-	
1928–29	Sheffield Amateur League	-	8th/11	-	-	-	
1929–30	Sheffield Amateur League	-	1st/10	-	-	-	Lost league play-off
1930–31	Sheffield Amateur League	-		-	-	-	
1931–32	Sheffield Amateur League	-	3rd/13	-	-	-	
1932–33	Sheffield Amateur League	-	9th/11	-	-	-	
1933–34	Sheffield Amateur League	-	12th/14	-	-	-	
1934–35	Sheffield Amateur League	-	7th/11	-	-	-	
1935–36	Sheffield Amateur League	-	15th/15	-	-	-	
1936–37	Sheffield Amateur League	-	4th/10	-	-	-	
1937–38	Sheffield Amateur League	-	8th/11	-	-	-	
1938–39	Sheffield Amateur League	-		-	-	-	
1939–40	Club did not enter any competitions due to World War II						
1940–41	Club did not enter any competitions due to World War II						
1941–42	Club did not enter any competitions due to World War II						
1942–43	Club did not enter any competitions due to World War II						
1943–44	Club did not enter any competitions due to World War II						
1944–45	Club did not enter any competitions due to World War II						
1945–46	Club did not enter any competitions due to World War II						
1946–47	Sheffield Amateur League	-		-	-	-	
1947–48	Sheffield Amateur League	-		-	-	-	
1948–49	Hatchard League	-		-	PR	-	
1949–50	Hatchard League	-		-	1QR	-	
1950–51	Hatchard League	-	1st	-	PR	-	League champions
1951–52	Hatchard League	-		-	2QR	-	
1952–53	Hatchard League	-	5th/14	-	1QR	-	
1953–54	Hatchard League	-		-	1QR	-	
1954–55	Hatchard League	-		-	PR	-	
1955–56	Hatchard League	-		-	PR	-	
1956–57	Hatchard League	-	9th/16	-	1QR	-	
1957–58	Hatchard League	-		-	EPR	-	
1958–59	Hatchard League	-		-	PR	-	
1959–60	Hatchard League	-	2nd/16	-	1QR	-	
1960–61	Hatchard League	-	1st/15	-	2QR	-	League champions
1961–62	Hatchard League	-	5th/16	-	PR	-	
1962–63	Sheffield Association League Division Two	-	1st/13	-	PR	-	League champions, promoted
1963–64	Sheffield Association League Division One	-	4th/16	-	1QR	-	
1964–65	Sheffield Association League Division One	-		-	-	-	
1965–66	Sheffield Association League Division One	-		-	-	-	
1966–67	Sheffield Association League Division One	-	5th/18	-	-	-	
1967–68	Sheffield Association League Division One	-		-	-	-	
1968–69	Sheffield Association League Division One	-		-	-	-	
1969–70	Sheffield Association League Division One	-		-	-	-	
1970–71	Sheffield Association League Division One	-		-	-	-	
1971–72	Sheffield Association League Division One	-		-	-	-	
1972–73	Sheffield Association League Division One	-	9th/16	-	-	-	
1973–74	Sheffield Association League Division One	-		-	-	-	Relegated
1974–75	Sheffield Association League Division Two	-		-	-	-	
1975–76	Sheffield Association League Division Two	-	8th/16	-	-	-	
1976–77	Sheffield Association League Division Two	-	6th/14	-	-	-	
1977–78	Sheffield Association League Division Two	-		-	-	-	Promoted
1978–79	Sheffield Association League Division One	-	13th/16	-	-	-	
1979–80	Sheffield Association League Division One	-		-	-	-	Relegated
1980–81	Sheffield Association League Division Two	-		-	-	-	
1981–82	Sheffield Association League Division Two	-		-	-	-	Promoted
1982–83	Sheffield Association League Division One	-		-	-	-	
1983–84	Sheffield & Hallamshire County Senior League Premier Division	-	14th/14	-	-	-	Relegated
1984–85	Sheffield & Hallamshire County Senior League Division One	-	13th/14	-	-	-	Relegated
1985–86	Sheffield & Hallamshire County Senior League Division Two	-	6th/13	-	-	-	
1986–87	Sheffield & Hallamshire County Senior League Division Two	-	7th/13	-	-	-	
1987–88	Sheffield & Hallamshire County Senior League Division Two	-	4th/13	-	-	-	
1988–89	Sheffield & Hallamshire County Senior League Division Two	-	6th/14	-	-	-	
1989–90	Sheffield & Hallamshire County Senior League Division Two	-	8th/14	-	-	-	
1990–91	Sheffield & Hallamshire County Senior League Division Two	-	10th/14	-	-	-	
1991–92	Sheffield & Hallamshire County Senior League Division Two	-	5th/10	-	-	-	Promoted
1992–93	Sheffield & Hallamshire County Senior League Division One	-	4th/14	-	-	-	
1993–94	Sheffield & Hallamshire County Senior League Division One	-	1st/13	-	-	-	League champions, promoted
1994–95	Sheffield & Hallamshire County Senior League Premier Division	-	9th/14	-	-	-	
1995–96	Sheffield & Hallamshire County Senior League Premier Division	-	13th/14	-	-	-	Relegated
1996–97	Sheffield & Hallamshire County Senior League Division One	-	3rd/13	-	-	-	Promoted
1997–98	Sheffield & Hallamshire County Senior League Premier Division	-	10th/14	-	-	-	
1998–99	Sheffield & Hallamshire County Senior League Premier Division	-	12th/14	-	-	-	Relegated
1999–00	Sheffield & Hallamshire County Senior League Division One	-	8th/14	-	-	-	
2000–01	Sheffield & Hallamshire County Senior League Division One	-	1st/13	-	-	-	League champions, promoted
2001–02	Sheffield & Hallamshire County Senior League Premier Division	-	7th/14	-	-	-	
2002–03	Sheffield & Hallamshire County Senior League Premier Division	-	2nd/13	-	-	-	
2003–04	Sheffield & Hallamshire County Senior League Premier Division	-	5th/14	-	-	-	
2004–05	Sheffield & Hallamshire County Senior League Premier Division	11	9th/14	-	-	-	
2005–06	Sheffield & Hallamshire County Senior League Premier Division	11	9th/14	-	-	-	
2006–07	Sheffield & Hallamshire County Senior League Premier Division	11	13th/14	-	-	-	Relegated
2007–08	Sheffield & Hallamshire County Senior League Division One	12	2nd/13	-	-	-	Promoted
2008–09	Sheffield & Hallamshire County Senior League Premier Division	11	10th/13	-	-	-	
2009–10	Sheffield & Hallamshire County Senior League Premier Division	11	7th/12	-	-	-	
2010–11	Sheffield & Hallamshire County Senior League Premier Division	11	3rd/14	-	-	-	
2011–12	Sheffield & Hallamshire County Senior League Premier Division	11	4th/14	-	-	-	
2012–13	Sheffield & Hallamshire County Senior League Premier Division	11	3rd/15	-	-	-	
2013–14	Sheffield & Hallamshire County Senior League Premier Division	11	4th/14	-	-	1QR	Promoted
2014–15	Northern Counties East League Division One	10	9th/22	-	-	1QR	
2015–16	Northern Counties East League Division One	10	5th/21	EPR	-	2QR	
2016–17	Northern Counties East League Division One	10	6th/22	EPR	-	1R	Promoted (won play-off)
2017–18	Northern Counties East League Premier Division	9	7th/22	2QR	-	1QR	
2018–19	Northern Counties East League Premier Division	9	2nd/20	PR	-	1QR	
2019–20	Northern Counties East League Premier Division	9	–	EPR	-	1R	League season abandoned due to COVID-19 pandemic
2020–21	Northern Counties East League Premier Division	9	–	EPR	-	2R	League season abandoned due to COVID-19 pandemic
2021–22	Northern Counties East League Premier Division	9	6th/20	EPR	-	1QR	
2022–23	Northern Counties East League Premier Division	9	5th/20	1QR	-	1R	
2023–24	Northern Counties East League Premier Division	9	6th/20	PR	-	1QR	
2024–25	Northern Counties East League Premier Division	9	8th/20	EPR	-	2QR	
2025–26	Northern Counties East League Premier Division	9	13th/20	EPR	-	1R	
Season	Division	Level	Position	FA Cup	FA Amateur Cup	FA Vase	Notes
Source: Football Club History Database

== Notable former players ==
Players that have played in the Football League either before or after playing for Penistone Church:

- Harry Fearnley
- Seth King
- John Stones

== Ground ==
The club plays at the Memorial Ground, Church View Road, Penistone, S36 6AT.

== Honours ==
=== League ===
- Sheffield & Hallamshire County Senior League Premier Division
  - Promoted: 2013–14
- Sheffield & Hallamshire County Senior League Division One
  - Promoted: 1993–94 (champions), 1996–97, 2000–01 (champions), 2007–08
- Sheffield & Hallamshire County Senior League Division Two
  - Promoted: 1991–92
- Hatchard League
  - Champions: 1950–51, 1960–61

=== Cup ===
- Sheffield & Hallamshire Junior Cup
  - Winners: 1908–09, 1936–37
- Sheffield & Hallamshire County Senior League Cup
  - Winners: 2011–12, 2013–14
- Northern Counties East Football League Cup
  - Winners: 2016–17

== Records ==
- Best League performance: 2nd in Northern Counties East League Premier Division, 2018–19
- Best FA Amateur Cup performance: 2nd qualifying round (1951–52, 1960–61)
- Best FA Cup performance: Second qualifying round (2018–19)
- Best FA Vase performance: Second round (2020–21)
- Record attendance: 1007 v [Sheffield FC], Northern Counties East League Premier Division, 4th April 2026
