= Thorncliffe Recreation F.C. =

Thorncliffe Recreation
- Full name: Thorncliffe Recreation Football Club

Thorncliffe Recreation F.C. was an English association football club based in Sheffield, South Yorkshire.

== History ==
=== League and cup history ===
Thorncliffe Recreation League and Cup history
Season	Division	Position	FA Amateur Cup
1952–53	Sheffield Association League	1st	-
1955–56			Extra Preliminary Round
1956–57			3rd Qualifying Round
1957–58			2nd Qualifying Round
1958–59			Preliminary Round
1959–60	Sheffield Association League	1st	Preliminary Round
1960–61			Preliminary Round
1961–62	S&H County Senior League	/20	3rd Qualifying Round
1962–63	S&H County Senior League - Division 1	/15	
1963–64	S&H County Senior League - Division 1	2nd/16	Preliminary Round

== Honours ==
=== League ===
- Sheffield Association League
  - Champions: 1952–53, 1959–60

=== Cup ===
- Wharncliffe Charity Cup
  - Winners: 1953–54, 1959–60

== Records ==
- Best FA Amateur Cup performance: 3rd Qualifying Round, 1956–57, 1961–62
