= Dinnington Main F.C. =

Dinnington Main
- Full name: Dinnington Main Football Club

Dinnington Main F.C. was an English association football club based in Dinnington, Rotherham, South Yorkshire.

== History ==
Little is known of the club other than that it competed in the FA Cup on numerous occasions either side of the First World War.

=== Notable former players ===
Players that have played in the Football League either before or after playing for Dinnington Main –

- Percy Downes
- John Lang
- Dick Neal

=== League and cup history ===
Dinnington Main league and cup history
Season	Division	Position	FA Cup
1907–08	Hatchard League Division 1 Portland Senior League	/10 *	-
1908–09	Hatchard League Division 1	/9	-
1909–10	Hatchard League	/14*	-
1910–11	Hatchard League; Holbrook Senior League	/9* /7	-
1911–12	Hatchard League	/12	-
1912–13	Hatchard League	/14	-
1913–14	Hatchard League	/13	-
1914–15	Hatchard League	/10	-
1919–20	Hatchard League	/10	-
1920–21	Sheffield Association League		-
1921–22	Sheffield Association League		Extra preliminary round
1922–23			1st qualifying round
1922–24			Preliminary round
1924–25			Preliminary round
1925–26	Sheffield Association League; Portland Senior League	/13 /6	Preliminary round
1926–27	Sheffield Association League; Portland Senior League	/14 /6	Preliminary round
1927–28	Sheffield Association League	/14	Preliminary round
1928–29	Sheffield Association League	/15	-

* League play-off winners

== Honours ==
=== League ===
- Hatchard League
  - Champions: 1909–10, 1910–11
- Portland Senior League
  - Promoted: 1907–08

=== Cup ===
None

== Records ==
- Best FA Cup performance: 1st qualifying round, 1922–23
