= Dearne Community & Miners Welfare F.C. =

Dearne Community & Miners Welfare
- Full name: Dearne Community & Miners Welfare Football Club

Dearne Community & Miners Welfare F.C. was an English association football club from Goldthorpe, South Yorkshire. The club competed in the FA Amateur Cup in 1947, and won the Hatchard League in 1958 and 1959
