= Lopham Street United Methodists F.C. =

Lopham Street Methodists
- Full name: Lopham Street Methodists Football Club

Lopham Street Methodists F.C., (also known as Lopham Street United Methodists), was an English association football club based in Sheffield, South Yorkshire.

== History ==
Little is known of the club other than that they competed in the FA Cup in the 1930s.

=== League and cup history ===
Loopham Street UM League and Cup history
Season	FA Cup
1937–38	Extra preliminary round
1938–39	Preliminary round

== Honours ==
=== League ===
None

=== Cup ===
- Sheffield & Hallamshire Senior Cup
  - Runners-up: 1937–38

== Records ==
- Best FA Cup performance: Preliminary Round, 1938–39
