= Atlas Sports & Social F.C. =

Atlas Sports & Social
- Full name: Atlas Sports & Social Football Club
- Founded: 1905 (as Atlas & Norfolk Works)
- Dissolved: 1983
- Ground: Roe Lane, Shirecliffe

Atlas Sports & Social F.C. was an English association football club based in Sheffield, South Yorkshire.

== History ==
The club was the formed as the works football team of Firth Brown in 1905, although it was named Atlas & Norfolk Works in homage to the name of the two main foundries owned by the company.

The Atlas & Norfolk Works name remained for 58 years, during which time the club won the Sheffield Amateur League title three times and the Hatchard League twice. They also competed in the FA Cup and FA Amateur Cup during this era.

In 1963 the team was renamed as simply Firth Brown, but this name only lasted until 1976, when the name Atlas Sports & Social was used.

In 1982, the Firth Brown company merged with the British Steel Corporation's River Don Works to form Sheffield Forgemasters, and a year later the football teams of the two firms also joined forces. Forgemasters Sports & Social FC remained in the Sheffield & Hallamshire County Senior League until 1991.

=== Notable former players ===
Players that played in the Football League before or after playing for Atlas & Norfolk –

- Ernest Blackwell
- Ted Hufton
- Albert Hutchinson
- Ernest Jackson
- Vince Kenny
- Joe North
- Sam Taylor
- Roy Warhurst

== Records ==
- Best FA Cup performance: 2nd Qualifying Round, 1921–22
- Best FA Amateur Cup performance: 2nd Qualifying Round, 1956–57
