= Treeton Reading Room F.C. =

Treeton Reading Room
- Full name: Treeton Reading Room Football Club
Home colours

Treeton Reading Room F.C. was an English association football club based in Treeton, Yorkshire.

== History ==
The club took its name from the Reading Room in the village, where it usually held its meetings.

=== League and cup history ===
Treeton Reading Room League and Cup history
Season	FA Cup	FA Amateur Cup
1920–21	Extra preliminary round	-
1921–22	Preliminary round	-
1922–23	2nd qualifying round	-
1923–24	1st qualifying round	-
1924–25	Preliminary round	-
1925–26	2nd qualifying round	-
1927–28	Extra preliminary round	-
1928–29	3rd qualifying round	3rd qualifying round

== Colours ==
The club wore white shirts and black knickers.

== Records ==
- Best FA Cup performance: 3rd qualifying round, 1928–29
- Best FA Amateur Cup performance: 3rd qualifying round, 1928–29
