= Sheffield Association League =

- Founded: 1897
- Folded: 1983
- Country: England
- Most championships: South Kirkby Colliery, Wath Athletic (4 titles)

The Sheffield Association League was an English association football league based in Sheffield, South Yorkshire.

== History ==
The league was founded in 1897 to fill the void left by the disbandment of the Sheffield & District Football League, which had run from 1889 to 1895. It soon established itself as the foremost league competition for non-league clubs in the south of Yorkshire. In 1960 the league was renamed the Sheffield & Hallamshire County Senior League. The league was suspended for the duration of the First World War but continued throughout the Second World War.

In 1983 the league merged with the Hatchard League to form a new competition, albeit one which kept the County Senior League name.

== Champions ==
Season	
1896–97	Sheffield United reserves
1897–98	Parkgate United
1898–99	Parkgate United & Worksop Town (shared)
1899–1900	Sheffield Wednesday reserves
1900–01	Sheffield Wednesday reserves
1901–02	Barnsley reserves
1902–03	Rotherham Town
1903–04	Mexborough Town
1904–05	Thornhill United reserves
1905–06	South Kirkby Colliery
1906–07	South Kirkby Colliery
1907–08	Wath Athletic
1908–09	Denaby United reserves
1909–10	Monckton Athletic
1910–11	Wath Athletic
1911–12	Wath Athletic
1912–13	Wath Athletic
1913–14	South Kirkby Colliery
1914–15	Rotherham County reserves
1915–16	Hoyland United
1916–17	No competition due to WWI
1917–18	No competition due to WWI
1918–19	No competition due to WWI
1919–20	Bentley Colliery
1920–21	Frickley Colliery
1921–22	Gainsborough Trinity reserves
1922–23	Worksop Town reserves
1923–24	Eckington Works
1924–25	Attercliffe
1925–26	Maltby Main
1926–27	Maltby Main
1927–28	Norton Woodseats
1928–29	Worksop Town reserves
1929–30	South Kirkby Colliery
1930–31	South Kirkby Colliery
1931–32	Wath Athletic
1932–33	Silverwood Colliery
1933–34	Thurnscoe Victoria
1934–35	Dinnington Athletic
1935–36	Rawmarsh Welfare
1936–37	Thurnscoe Victoria
1937–38	Norton Woodseats
1938–39	Rawmarsh Welfare
1939–40	Bolsover Colliery
1940–41	Denaby United
1941–42	Royal Army Service Corps
1942–43	Thurcroft Main
1943–44	Sheffield Wednesday reserves
1944–45	Royal Army Service Corps
1945–46	Thurnscoe Victoria
1946–47	Kilnhurst Colliery
1947–48	Worksop Town
1948–49	Worksop Town
1949–50	Hallam
1950–51	Rawmarsh Welfare
1951–52	Beighton Miners Welfare reserves
1952–53	Thorncliffe Recreation
1953–54	Upton Colliery
1954–55	Denaby United reserves
1955–56	Upton Colliery
1956–57	Upton Colliery
1957–58	Grimethorpe Athletic
1958–59	Upton Colliery
1959–60	Thorncliffe Recreation
1960–61	Worksop Town
1961–62	Parkgate Welfare

Season	Division One	Division Two
1962–63	Worksop Town reserves	Penistone Church
1963–64	Brown Bayley Steels	Hatfield Main reserves
1964–65	Harworth Colliery Institute	Dearne Community & Miners Welfare
1965–66	Worsbrough Bridge Miners Welfare	Maltby Miners Welfare
1966–67	Manton Athletic	Frecheville Community
1967–68	Frecheville Community	Sheffield Waterworks
1968–69	Sheffield Waterworks	Centralians
1969–70	Worsbrough Bridge Miners Welfare	Worksop Town reserves
1970–71	Woolley Miners Welfare	Kilnhurst Colliery
1971–72	Kilnhurst Colliery	Charlton United
1972–73	Pilkington Recreation	Brown Bayley Steels
1973–74	Kilnhurst Colliery	Jubilee Sports
1974–75	Swinton Athletic	Kiveton Park reserves
1975–76	Harworth Colliery Institute	BSC Parkgate reserves
1976–77	Swinton Athletic	Ecclesfield Red Rose
1977–78	Charlton Tavern	Norton Woodseats reserves
1978–79	Ecclesfield Red Rose	Woodhouse Ashberry
1979–80	Swinton Athletic	Double Barrel
1980–81	Swinton Athletic	Kiveton Park reserves
1981–82	Double Barrel	Yorkshire Main Colliery
1982–83	Yorkshire Main Colliery	Windsor
