= 1920–21 FA Cup qualifying rounds =

Tournament details
- Country: England; Wales

The 1920–21 FA Cup was the 46th season of the world's oldest football knockout competition; the Football Association Challenge Cup, or FA Cup for short. The large number of clubs entering the tournament from lower down the English football league system meant that the competition started with an extra Preliminary and preliminary rounds prior to six qualifying rounds. The 12 victorious teams from the Sixth round qualifying (from the 466 who contested the qualifying phase) progressed to the first round proper.

== Rounds: draw and playing dates and number of teams ==
Round	Draw Date	Date Played	Teams from Previous Round	Additional Teams	Total Teams	Ties Played
Extra preliminary round	28 May 1920	11 September 1920	–	142	142	71
Preliminary round	28 May 1920	25 September 1920	71	263	334	167
First qualifying round	28 May 1920	9 October 1920	167	25	192	96
Second qualifying round	11–14 October 1920	23 October 1920	96	0	96	48
Third qualifying round	28 October 1920	6 November 1920	48	0	48	24
Fourth qualifying round	8 November 1920	20 November 1920	24	24	48	24
Fifth qualifying round	22 November 1920	4 December 1920	24	0	24	12
Sixth qualifying round	6 December 1920	18 December 1920	12	12	24	12

== Extra preliminary to third qualifying round ==
The five rounds from the extra preliminary to the third qualifying involved 430 teams from England and Wales. These were arranged into 24 geographically based divisions which thereby created matches against local rival clubs and limited the travelling required. Through a series of knock-out matches one team from each division progressed to the fourth qualifying round.

Key to abbreviations in tables below
R=Replay (after first match being a draw)
R2= Second Replay (usually played on a neutral ground)
§=The away club agreed to switch the tie from their home ground
†= result awarded (reason as indicated)

=== Division 1 (Northumberland / Tyneside / Wearside) ===
The division comprised 20 teams, of which 8 of the generally smaller teams were drawn into the extra preliminary round to reduce the number to 16 teams required for 8 preliminary round ties.

Tie	Home team	Score	Away team	Note
Extra preliminary round
	Newburn	3–2	Walker Celtic	
	Preston Colliery	6–0	Heaton Stannington	
	Prudhoe Castle	0–3	Hebburn Colliery	
	Seaton Delaval	3–0	St Peters Albion	
Preliminary round
	Ashington	1–0	Close Works	§
	Bedlington United	1–1	Hebburn Colliery	§
	Lintz Institute	4–1	Newburn	
	Mickley	2–1	Pandon Temperance	§
	Preston Colliery	1–0	Jarrow	
	Scotswood	1–0	Chopwell Institute	
	Spen Black & White	4–3	Seaton Delaval	
	Usworth Colliery	1–3	Wallsend	
Preliminary round replay
R	Bedlington United	1–2	Hebburn Colliery	
First qualifying round
	Ashington	2–0	Spen Black & White	
	Mickley	2–3	Hebburn Colliery	
	Scotswood	1–0	Preston Colliery	
	Wallsend	3–2	Lintz Institute	
Second qualifying round
	Ashington	0–1	Wallsend	
	Scotswood	2–1	Hebburn Colliery	§
Third qualifying round
	Scotswood	2–0	Wallsend	

=== Division 2 (County Durham / Tyneside / Wearside) ===
The division comprised 18 teams, of which 4 of the generally smaller teams were drawn into the extra preliminary round to reduce the number to 16 teams required for 8 preliminary round ties.

Tie	Home team	Score	Away team	Note
Extra preliminary round
	Consett Celtic	3–0	Twizell United	
	Wingate Albion Comrades	1–1	Craghead United	
Extra preliminary round replay
R	Craghead United	4–0	Wingate Albion Comrades	
Preliminary round
	Annfield Plain	2–1	Esh Winning	
	Birtley	1–0	Craghead United	
	Consett Celtic	0–1	Tow Law Town	
	Hobson Wanderers	0–3	Horden Athletic	
	Houghton	2–0	Dipton United	
	Leadgate Park	3–0	Crook Town	
	Seaham Harbour	3–1	Langley Park	
	Sunderland West End	3–0	Wolsingham	
First qualifying round
	Annfield Plain	3–2	Sunderland West End	
	Horden Athletic	1–0	Birtley	
	Houghton	w–/	Leadgate Park	†
Leadgate won match 2-0 but were disqualified for using an ineligible player
	Seaham Harbour	5–3	Tow Law Town	
Second qualifying round
	Annfield Plain	0–1	Houghton	
	Horden Athletic	0–0	Seaham Harbour	
Second qualifying round Replays
R	Seaham Harbour	1–1	Horden Athletic	
R2	Horden Athletic	4–5	Seaham Harbour	
Third qualifying round
	Seaham Harbour	1–1	Houghton	
Third qualifying round replay
R	Houghton	4–1	Seaham Harbour	

=== Division 3 (County Durham / North Yorkshire / East Riding of Yorkshire) ===
The division comprised 20 teams, of which 8 of the generally smaller teams were drawn into the extra preliminary round to reduce the number to 16 teams required for 8 preliminary round ties.

Tie	Home team	Score	Away team	Note
Extra preliminary round
	Bridlington Town	6–2	Redcar	
	Filey	0–2	South Bank East End	
	Haverton Hill	3–0	West Auckland Town	
	Spennymoor United	1–2	Willington AFC	
Preliminary round
	Grangetown St Mary's	1–0	Brotton	
	Hartlepools United	7–0	South Bank East End	
	Haverton Hill	3–2	Darlington Rly Carrge Wks	
	Loftus Albion	5–0	Bridlington Town	
	Scarborough	4–1	Stanley United	
	South Bank	3–1	Darlington Rlwy Athletic	
	Stockton	4–0	Shildon Athletic	
	Willington	0–1	Eston United	
First qualifying round
	Eston United	3–1	South Bank	
	Grangetown St Mary's	0–1	Scarborough	
	Hartlepools United	3–3	Haverton Hill	§
	Stockton	1–2	Loftus Albion	
First qualifying round replays
R	Hartlepools United	0–0	Haverton Hill	
R2	Haverton Hill	0–1	Hartlepools United	
Second qualifying round
	Eston United	4–4	Loftus Albion	
	Scarborough	1–4	Hartlepools United	
Second qualifying round replay
R	Loftus Albion	3–0	Eston United	
Third qualifying round
	Hartlepools United	2–1	Loftus Albion	

=== Division 4 (Cumbria) ===
The division comprised 14 teams from which 6 preliminary round ties were drawn, resulting in byes to the first qualifying round for 2 teams: Cleator Moor Celtic and Carlisle United.

Tie	Home team	Score	Away team	Note
Preliminary round
	Barrow	4–0	Vickerstown	
	Barrow YMCA	0–2	Arlecdon Red Rose	
	Frizington Athletic	2–0	Dalton Casuals	
	Parton Athletic	0–0	Lowca	
	Penrith	6–0	Distington	
	Wath Brow United	10–2	Appleby	
Preliminary round replays
R	Lowca	1–1	Parton Athletic	
R2	Parton Athletic	3–0	Lowca	
First qualifying round
	Arlecdon Red Rose	3–1	Parton Athletic	
	Barrow	12–0	Cleator Moor Celtic	§
	Frizington Athletic	1–3	Carlisle United	
	Penrith	1–2	Wath Brow United	
Second qualifying round
	Barrow	1–1	Carlisle United	
	Wath Brow United	3–1	Arlecdon Red Rose	
Second qualifying round replay
R	Carlisle United	/ – w	Barrow	†
Carlisle won 1-0 but were disqualified for using an ineligible player
Third qualifying round
	Barrow	3–0	Wath Brow United	

=== Division 5 (Lancashire) ===
The division comprised 13 teams from which 5 preliminary round ties were drawn, resulting in byes to the first qualifying round for 3 teams: Chorley, Leyland and Horwich RMI.

Tie	Home team	Score	Away team	Note
Preliminary round
	Fleetwood	8–0	Accrington Stanley	
	Great Harwood	0–1	Dick, Kerr's	§
	Lancaster Town	3–2	Portsmouth Rovers	§
	Morecambe	1–1	Breightmet United	
	Nelson	4–1	Skelmersdale United	
Preliminary round replay
R	Morecambe	0–2	Breightmet United	§
First qualifying round
	Chorley	0–1	Leyland	
	Fleetwood	6–0	Dick, Kerr's	§
	Lancaster Town	5–0	Breightmet United	§
	Nelson	3–0	Horwich RMI	
Second qualifying round
	Fleetwood	5–0	Nelson	
	Lancaster Town	2–2	Leyland	
Second qualifying round replay
R	Leyland	0–1	Lancaster Town	
Third qualifying round
	Lancaster Town	1–1	Fleetwood	
Third qualifying round replay
R	Fleetwood	5–1	Lancaster Town	

=== Division 6 (Lancashire / Cheshire / Derbyshire) ===
The division comprised 13 teams from which 5 preliminary round ties with drawn, resulting in byes to the first qualifying round for 3 teams; Monks Hall, Altrincham and Runcorn.

Tie	Home team	Score	Away team	Note
Preliminary round
	Chapel-en-le-Frith	3–4	Grayson's Garston	§
	Eccles United	10–0	Glossop	
	Garston Gasworks	4–0	Buxton	
	Hurst	7–0	Matlock Town	
	Sandbach Ramblers	3–6	Congleton Town	
First qualifying round
	Congleton Town	5–1	Grayson's Garston	
	Eccles United	1–0	Altrincham	
	Garston Gasworks	2–1	Monks Hall	
	Runcorn	2–2	Hurst	
First qualifying round replay
R	Hurst	5–1	Runcorn	
Second qualifying round
	Congleton Town	1–0	Garston Gasworks	
	Eccles United	2–0	Hurst	
Third qualifying round
	Congleton Town	2–3	Eccles United	

=== Division 7 (Liverpool / Cheshire / North Wales) ===
The division comprised 18 teams, of which 4 of the generally smaller teams were drawn into the extra preliminary round to reduce the number to 16 teams required for 8 preliminary round ties.

Tie	Home team	Score	Away team	Note
Extra preliminary round
	Marine	4–0	Bromborough	
	Prescot Wire Works	2–1	Old Xaverians	
Preliminary round
	Buckley United	w – /	Marlborough Old Boys	†
Marlborough scratched, match awarded to Buckley United
	Harrowby	3–3	South Liverpool	
	Lostock Gralam	8–1	Liverpool St Cleopas’ OB	
	Marine	9–2	Oswestery South	
	Nantwich Town	4–0	Witton Albion	
	Prescot	4–2	Northern Nomads	§
	Prescot Wire Works	3–0	Winsford United	
	Wrexham	3–0	Northwich Victoria	
Preliminary round replay
R	South Liverpool	0–1	Harrowby	
First qualifying round
	Buckley United	4–1	Nantwich Town	
	Harrowby	0–1	Prescot	
	Marine	4–1	Lostock Gralam	
	Wrexham	7–0	Prescot Wire Works	
Second qualifying round
	Buckley United	1–1	Marine	
	Wrexham	2–0	Prescot	
Second qualifying round replay
R	Marine	0–2	Buckley United	
Third qualifying round
	Buckley United	1–0	Wrexham	

=== Division 8 (Staffordshire / Shropshire / Birmingham / Worcestershire) ===
The division comprised 26 teams, of which 20 of the generally smaller teams were drawn into the extra preliminary round to reduce the number to 16 teams required for 8 preliminary round ties.

Tie	Home team	Score	Away team	Note
Extra preliminary round
	Bilston United	1–3	Kidderminster Harriers	
	Bloxwich Strollers	0–0	Stafford Rangers	
	Brierley Hill Alliance	1–4	Halesowen	
	Cannock Town	4–1	Atherstone Town	
	Darlaston	3–0	Oakengates Town	
	Talbot Stead	1–0	Walsall Wood	
	Wednesbury Old Athletic	3–1	Wolverhampton Amateurs	
	Wellington St George's	2–1	Redditch	
	West Birmingham	1–2	Birmingham Corp.Tramways	
	Willenhall Swifts	1–1	Stourbridge	
Extra preliminary round replays
R	Stafford Rangers	2–2	Bloxwich Strollers	
R	Stourbridge	1–2	Willenhall Swifts	
R2	Stafford Rangers	1–2	Bloxwich Strollers	
Preliminary round
	Bloxwich Strollers	0–6	Wellington Town	
	Cradley Heath St Luke's	3–1	Darlaston	
	Halesowen	3–2	Kidderminster Harriers	
	Hednesford Town	4–1	Willenhall Swifts	
	Walsall	3–0	Birmingham Tramways	
	Wednesbury Old Athletic	3–1	Cannock Town	
	Wellington St George's	1–2	Shrewsbury Town	
	Worcester City	1–1	Talbot Stead	
Preliminary round replay
R	Talbot Stead	1–0	Worcester City	
First qualifying round
	Cradley Heath St Luke's	5–0	Halesowen	
	Shrewsbury Town	1–0	Walsall	
	Talbot Stead	1–4	Hednesford Town	
	Wednesbury Old Athletic	0–3	Wellington Town	
Second qualifying round
	Hednesford Town	3–2	Shrewsbury Town	
	Wellington Town	1–0	Cradley Heath St Luke's	
Third qualifying round
	Hednesford Town	2–1	Wellington Town	

=== Division 9 (East Riding of Yorkshire / North Lincolnshire) ===
The division comprised 28 teams, of which 24 of the generally smaller teams were drawn into the extra preliminary round to reduce the number to 16 teams required for 8 preliminary round ties..

Tie	Home team	Score	Away team	Note
Extra preliminary round
	Barton Town	2–2	Hull Dairycoates	
	Bentley Colliery	4–0	Grimsby STC	
	Charltons (Grimsby)	1–1	Goole Shipyards	
	Frodingham Iron & Steel Ath.	3–6	Gilberdyke	
	Grimsby Haycroft Rovers	3–0	Gainsborough Albion Works	
	Holderness Athletic	0–2	Brunswick Institute	
	Hook Shipyards	4–1	West Hull Albion	
	Hull St Peter's Old Boys	1–1	Newland Choir	
	Hull Wanderers	2– 5	Brodsworth Main	
	Marfleet	/ – w	Hull Old Boys	
	Shiphams (Hull)	3–6	Grimsby Rovers	
	Withernsea	3–0	Sutton (Hull)	
Extra preliminary round replays
R	Goole Shipyards	1–2	Charltons (Grimsby)	
R	Hull Dairycoates	0–1	Barton Town	
R	Newland Choir	1–2	Hull St Peter's Old Boys	
Preliminary round
	Barton Town	1–2	Hook Shipyards	
	Bentley Colliery	4–0	Hull St Peter's Old Boys	
	Brodsworth Main	5–2	Hull Graving Dock	
	Charltons (Grimsby)	5–0	Withernsea	§
	Cleethorpes	1–3	Gilberdyke	
	Gainsborough Trinity	5–0	Hull Old Boys	§
	Grimsby Haycroft Rovers	4–4	Grimsby Rovers	
	Scunthorpe & Lindsey United	6–0	Brunswick Institute	§
Preliminary round replay
R	Grimsby Rovers	7–2	Grimsby Haycroft Rovers	
First qualifying round
	Gainsborough Trinity	7–0	Grimsby Rovers	
	Gilberdyke Athletic	2–2	Brodsworth Main	
	Hook Shipyards	2–3	Charltons (Grimsby)	
	Scunthorpe & Lindsey United	3–0	Bentley Colliery	
First qualifying round replay
R	Brodsworth Main	w – /	Gilberdyke	†
Gilberdyke scratched, match awarded to Brodsworth
Second qualifying round
	Charltons (Grimsby)	1–4	Scunthorpe & Lindsey United	
	Gainsborough Trinity	0–1	Brodsworth Main	
Third qualifying round
	Scunthorpe & Lindsey United	1–1	Brodsworth Main	
Third qualifying round replays
R	Brodsworth Main	0–0	Scunthorpe & Lindsey United	
R2	Scunthorpe & Lindsey United	3–1	Brodsworth Main	

=== Division 10 (West Riding of Yorkshire) ===
The division comprised 23 teams, of which 14 of the generally smaller teams were drawn into the extra preliminary round to reduce the number to 16 teams required for 8 preliminary round ties.

Tie	Home team	Score	Away team	Note
Extra preliminary round
	Allerton Bywater Colliery	3–0	Glasshoughton Colliery	
	Apperley Bridge	10–1	Selby Olympic	
	Halifax Town	5–3	Rowntrees	
	Horsforth	2–1	Ryhill Liberals	
	Leeds United	5–2	Boothtown	
	Mytholmroyd	1–4	Harrogate	
	Rothwell Parish Church	2–2	Hebden Bridge	
Extra preliminary round replay
R	Hebden Bridge	2–0	Rothwell Parish Church	
Preliminary round
	Allerton Bywater Colliery	4–1	Rothwell Athletic	
	Apperley Bridge	3–1	Yeadon Athletic	
	Bolton United	3–1	Horsforth	
	Halifax Town	3–1	Liversedge	
	Harrogate	3–2	Hebden Bridge	
	Leeds United	7–0	Leeds Steel Works	§
	South Kirkby Colliery	/ – /	Frickley Colliery	†
South Kirkby Colliery won 4-0 but were struck-out for using 2 ineligible players
	South Kirkby United	/ – w	Calverley	†
South Kirkby United scratched, match awarded to Calverley
First qualifying round
	Bolton United	/ – w	Calverley	†
Bolton United struck-out from competition owing to pitch size infringement
	Apperley Bridge	w – /		†
Bye for Apperley Bridge (South Kirkby Colliery struck-out after previous round)
	Halifax Town	4–1	Allerton Bywater Colliery	
	Harrogate	w – /	Leeds United	†
Leeds withdrew from competition, tie awarded to Harrogate
Second qualifying round
	Calverley	4–2	Apperley Bridge	
	Halifax Town	1–0	Harrogate	
Third qualifying round
	Calverley	2–4	Halifax Town	

=== Division 11 (South Yorkshire / Nottinghamshire) ===
The division comprised 26 teams, of which 20 of the generally smaller teams were drawn into the extra preliminary round to reduce the number to 16 teams required for 8 preliminary round ties.

This was the only division in which a team drawn into the extra preliminary round won the division – indeed Worksop Town eventually progressed to the Sixth qualifying round.

Tie	Home team	Score	Away team	Note
Extra preliminary round
	Ardsley Athletic	7–1	Goldthorpe Colliery	
	Conisbrough Athletic	0–14	Wath Athletic	
	Doncaster Rovers	6–0	Atlas & Norfolk Works	
	Kilnhurst United	0–0	Jump Working Men's Club	
	Kiveton Park Colliery	2–0	Anston United	
	Maltby Main Colliery	2–0	Hemingfield	
	Rawmarsh Athletic	0–1	Denaby United	
	Tankersley	3–0	Hoyland St Peter's	§
	Wombwell	4–0	Sheffield	
	Worksop Town	0–0	Treeton Reading Room	§
Extra preliminary round replays
R	Kilnhurst United	1–0	Jump Working Men's Club	
R	Worksop Town	2–0	Treeton Reading Room	
Preliminary round
	Denaby United	1–0	Ardsley Athletic	
	Doncaster Rovers	0–1	Wombwell	
	Grimethorpe Colliery Institute	3–2	Hoyland Common Wesleyans	
	Houghton Main Colliery	0–0	Tankersley	
	Mexborough	5–0	Kilnhurst United	§
	Wath Athletic	0–1	Rotherham Town	
	Wombwell Main	4–7	Maltby Main Colliery	
	Worksop Town	1–0	Kiveton Park Colliery	§
Preliminary round replay
R	Tankersley	0–1	Houghton Main Colliery	
First qualifying round
	Denaby United	1–2	Houghton Main Colliery	
	Mexborough	0–0	Rotherham Town	
	Wombwell	2–0	Maltby Main Colliery	
	Worksop Town	5–0	Grimethorpe Colliery Institute	§
First qualifying round replays
R	Rotherham Town	2–2	Mexborough	
R2	Mexborough	3–1	Rotherham Town	
Second qualifying round
	Mexborough	2–2	Houghton Main Colliery	
	Wombwell	1–2	Worksop Town	
Second qualifying round replay
R	Houghton Main Colliery	2–1	Mexborough	
Third qualifying round
	Worksop Town	3–1	Houghton Main Colliery	

=== Division 12 (Derbyshire) ===
The division comprised 15 teams from which 7 preliminary round ties were drawn, resulting in a bye to the first qualifying round for Staveley Town.

Tie	Home team	Score	Away team	Note
Preliminary round
	Beighton Recreation	2–4	Tibshelf Colliery	
	Blackwell Colliery	4–3	Clowne Colliery	
	Bolsover Colliery	/–w	Hardwick Colliery	†
Bolsover Colliery scratched, tie awarded to Hardwick Colliery
	Chesterfield Municipal	11–1	Dronfield Woodhouse	§
	Ilkeston United	3–0	Eckington Works	
	Long Eaton	2–1	South Normanton Colliery	
	Ripley Colliery	1–1	Clay Cross Town	
Preliminary round replay
R	Clay Cross Town	2–0	Ripley Colliery	
First qualifying round
	Chesterfield Municipal	2–1	Clay Cross Town	§
	Long Eaton	1–1	Ilkeston United	
	Staveley Town	1–1	Hardwick Colliery	
	Tibshelf Colliery	3–3	Blackwell Colliery	
First qualifying round replays
R	Blackwell Colliery	2–0	Tibshelf Colliery	
R	Staveley Town	5–2	Hardwick Colliery	
R	Ilkeston United	1–0	Long Eaton	
Second qualifying round
	Ilkeston United	0–0	Chesterfield Municipal	
	Staveley Town	4–1	Blackwell Colliery	
Second qualifying round replay
R	Chesterfield Municipal	1–0	Ilkeston United	
Third qualifying round
	Staveley Town	2–0	Chesterfield Municipal	

=== Division 13 (Nottinghamshire / South Lincolnshire) ===
The division comprised 18 teams, of which 4 of the generally smaller teams were drawn into the extra preliminary round to reduce the number to 16 teams required for 8 preliminary round ties.

Tie	Home team	Score	Away team	Note
Extra preliminary round
	Basford United	0–5	Lenton	§
	Player's Athletic	2–1	Kirkby Collieries	
Preliminary round
	Arnold St Mary's	2–1	Netherfield Rangers	
	Grantham	4–1	Sneinton	§
	Hucknall Byron	3–0	Lenton	
	Mansfield Town	8–1	Sutton Junction	§
	New Hucknall Colliery	0–3	Boots Athletic	
	Shirebrook	1–0	Ericsson Athletic	§
	Sutton Town	4–3	Newark	
	Welbeck Colliery	4–0	Player's Athletic	
First qualifying round
	Boots Athletic	3–0	Arnold St Mary's	
	Grantham	3–1	Shirebrook	
	Mansfield Town	A–A	Hucknall Byron	
Match abandoned after 55 mins (fog) with Mansfield leading 2-1
Re-staged tie
	Mansfield Town	5–0	Hucknall Byron	
	Sutton Town	1–3	Welbeck Colliery	
Second qualifying round
	Grantham	1–3	Mansfield Town	
	Welbeck Colliery	3–4	Boots Athletic	§
Third qualifying round
	Mansfield Town	3–0	Boots Athletic	§

=== Division 14 (Derbyshire / Staffordshire / Leicestershire / Warwickshire) ===
The division comprised 15 teams from which 7 preliminary round ties were drawn, resulting in a bye to the first qualifying round for Hinckley United.

Tie	Home team	Score	Away team	Note
Preliminary round
	Ashbourne Town	/ – w	Gresley Colliery	†
Ashbourne won 1-0, but match awarded to Gresley owing to a pitch size infringement
	Barwell United	3–3	Gresley Rovers	
	Burton All Saints	1–3	Bretby Colliery	
	Coalville Swifts	2–1	Ashby Town	
	Loughborough Brush Works	2–4	Coalville Town	
	Loughborough Corinthians	2–1	Rugby Town	
	Nuneaton Town	4–0	Whitwick Imperial	§
Preliminary round replay
R	Gresley Rovers	2–1	Barwell United	
First qualifying round
	Bretby Colliery	1–1	Coalville Swifts	
	Gresley Rovers	3–0	Loughborough Corinthians	
	Hinckley United	5–1	Coalville Town	
	Nuneaton Town	9–2	Gresley Colliery	§
First qualifying round replay
R	Coalville Swifts	4–0	Bretby Colliery	
Second qualifying round
	Coalville Swifts	0–2	Gresley Rovers	
	Nuneaton Town	3–1	Hinckley United	
Third qualifying round
	Nuneaton Town	3–1	Gresley Rovers	

=== Division 15 (South Lincolnshire / Northamptonshire / Bedfordshire) ===
The division comprised 19 teams, of which 6 of the generally smaller teams were drawn into the extra preliminary round to reduce the number to 16 teams required for 8 preliminary round ties.

Tie	Home team	Score	Away team	Note
Extra preliminary round
	Horncastle Town	3–2	Spilsby Town	
	Peterborough Westwood Wks	0–0	Rushden Town	
	Raunds Town	2–5	Northampton War Team	
Extra preliminary round replay
R	Rushden Town	4–0	Peterborough Westwood Wks	
Preliminary round
	Bedford Town	1–3	Kettering	
	Boston	7–1	Louth	
	Fletton United	2–3	Rushden Town	
	Horncastle Town	2–2	RAF Cranwell	
	Irthlingborough Town	1–0	Brotherhood Works	
	Northampton War Team	2–1	Market Harborough	
	Stamford	7–0	Boston St James'	§
	Wellingborough Town	2–4	Desborough Town	
Preliminary round replay
R	RAF Cranwell	6–1	Horncastle Town	
First qualifying round
	Boston	3–2	Stamford	
	Irthlingborough Town	2–5	Kettering	
	RAF Cranwell	2–3	Northampton War Team	
	Rushden Town	1–3	Desborough Town	
Second qualifying round
	Boston	1–2	Northampton War Team	
	Desborough Town	1–2	Kettering	
Third qualifying round
	Northampton War Team	0–4	Kettering	

=== Division 16 (Norfolk / Suffolk / Cambridgeshire / Essex) ===
The division comprised 13 teams from which 5 preliminary round ties were drawn, resulting in byes to the first qualifying round for 3 teams; Colchester Town, Lynn Town and Cambridge Town.

Tie	Home team	Score	Away team	Note
Preliminary round
	Bury United	1–1	Lowestoft	
	Clacton Town	0–1	Leiston Works Athletic	
	Gorleston	2–2	Norwich CEYMS	
	Great Yarmouth Town	3–0	Cromer	
	Terrington	1–5	Morton's Athletic	
Preliminary round replays
R	Lowestoft	2–0	Bury United	
R	Norwich CEYMS	0–1	Gorleston	
First qualifying round
	Cambridge Town	4–0	Morton's Athletic	
	Colchester Town	6–2	Lowestoft	
	Great Yarmouth Town	1–0	Lynn Town	
	Leiston Works Athletic	1–0	Gorleston	
Second qualifying round
	Colchester Town	3–1	Great Yarmouth Town	
	Leiston Works Athletic	0–0	Cambridge Town	
Second qualifying round replay
R	Cambridge Town	5–0	Leiston Works Athletic	
Third qualifying round
	Cambridge Town	1–2	Colchester Town	

=== Division 17 (Essex / East London) ===
The division comprised 13 teams from which 5 preliminary round ties were drawn, resulting in byes to the first qualifying round for three teams: Gnome Athletic, Hoffmanns Athletic and Clapton.

Tie	Home team	Score	Away team	Note
Preliminary round
	Barking Town	2–2	Grays Athletic	
	Chelmsford	3–1	Newportonians	
	Custom House	1–0	Southend Corinthians	
	Shoeburyness Garrison	1–2	GER Romford	
	Walthamstow Grange	3–1	Green & Silley Weir	
Preliminary round replay
R	Grays Athletic	3–5	Barking Town	
First qualifying round
	Barking Town	4–1	Hoffmanns Athletic	
	Chelmsford	1–2	Custom House	
	GER Romford	1–0	Clapton	
	Walthamstow Grange	1–2	Gnome Athletic	
Second qualifying round
	Gnome Athletic	1–1	Barking Town	
	GER Romford	3–0	Custom House	
Second qualifying round replay
R	Barking Town	5–1	Gnome Athletic	
Third qualifying round
	Barking Town	2–2	GER Romford	
Third qualifying round replay
R	GER Romford	5–2	Barking Town	

=== Division 18 (Bedfordshire / Middlesex / North London) ===
The division comprised 16 teams all included in the 8 preliminary round ties.

Tie	Home team	Score	Away team	Note
Preliminary round
	Barnet	2–1	London Generals	
	Enfield	2–2	Luton Amateurs	
	Fricker's Athletic	2–0	Wood Green Town	§
	Hampstead Town	8–0	Polytechnic	
	Leavesden Mental Hospital	w – /	Islington Town	†
Islington Town scratched, tie awarded to Leavesden
	St Albans City	1–0	West London Old Boys	
	Vauxhall Motors	0–0	Chiswick Town	
	Wealdstone	1–1	Cheshunt	
Preliminary round replays
R	Cheshunt	4–1	Wealdstone	
R	Chiswick Town	2–3	Vauxhall Motors	
R	Luton Amateurs	2–1	Enfield	
First qualifying round
	Barnet	8–0	Vauxhall Motors	
	Cheshunt	3–3	Fricker's Athletic	
	Hampstead Town	6–0	Luton Amateurs	
	Leavesden Mental Hospital	1–1	St Albans City	
First qualifying round replays
R	Fricker's Athletic	2–0	Cheshunt	
R	St Albans City	3–1	Leavesden Mental Hospital	
Second qualifying round
	Hampstead Town	5–1	Fricker's Athletic	
	St Albans City	4–2	Barnet	
Third qualifying round
	St Albans City	1–2	Hampstead Town	

=== Division 19 (Berkshire / Buckinghamshire / Oxfordshire / Middlesex) ===
The division comprised 12 teams from which 4 preliminary round ties were drawn, resulting in byes to the first qualifying round for 4 teams: Wycombe Wanderers, Windsor & Eton, Slough and Chesham United.

Tie	Home team	Score	Away team	Note
Preliminary round
	Henley Town	2–4	Reading United	§
	Marlow	1–3	Southall	
	Maidenhead United	7–1	Newbury Town	
	Yiewsley	1–1	Botwell Mission	
Preliminary round replay
R	Botwell Mission	6–1	Yiewsley	
First qualifying round
	Botwell Mission	1–5	Slough	
	Chesham United	2–3	Reading United	
	Windsor & Eton	3–1	Maidenhead United	
	Wycombe Wanderers	4–1	Southall	
Second qualifying round
	Slough	1–0	Reading United	
	Wycombe Wanderers	2–0	Windsor & Eton	
Third qualifying round
	Wycombe Wanderers	2–2	Slough	
Third qualifying round replay
R	Slough	2–7	Wycombe Wanderers	

=== Division 20 (Surrey / South London) ===
The division comprised 14 teams from which 6 preliminary round ties were drawn, resulting in byes to the first qualifying round for 2 teams: Wimbledon and Guildford.

Tie	Home team	Score	Away team	Note
Preliminary round
	Aquarius	1–6	Kingstonian	
	Earlsfield Town	1–5	West Norwood	
	Redhill	3–3	Summerstown	
	Sutton United	2–0	Camberley & Yorktown	
	Tooting Town	8–2	Hersham United	
	Woking	4–2	Walton-on-Thames	
Preliminary round replay
R	Summerstown	3–0	Redhill	
First qualifying round
	Kingstonian	3–2	Woking	
	Summerstown	1–0	Sutton United	
	Tooting Town	1–1	Guildford	
	Wimbledon	5–1	West Norwood	
First qualifying round replay
R	Guildford	3–0	Tooting Town	
Second qualifying round
	Kingstonian	2–1	Wimbledon	
	Guildford	7–2	Summerstown	
Third qualifying round
	Kingstonian	0–3	Guildford	

=== Division 21 (Kent / Sussex / South-East London) ===
The division comprised 20 teams, of which 8 of the generally smaller teams were drawn into the extra preliminary round to reduce the number to 16 teams required for 8 preliminary round ties.

Tie	Home team	Score	Away team	Note
Extra preliminary round
	Bexley Heath Labour	w – /	Dartford	†
Match awarded to Bexley Heath Labour
	Cray Wanderers	3–3	Bostall Heath	
	Newhaven	3–1	Vernon Athletic	§
	Whitstable Town	1–0	RN Depot	
Extra preliminary round replay
R	Bostall Heath	6–1	Cray Wanderers	
Preliminary round
	Ashford Railway Works	0–0	Woolwich Ordnance	
	Bexley Heath Labour	1–4	Margate	
	Charlton Athletic	6–0	Catford Southend	
	Folkestone	3–1	Tunbridge Wells Rangers	
	Maidstone United	9–0	Bostall Heath	§
	Northfleet United	6–2	Whitstable Town	§
	Sheppey United	2–1	Sittingbourne	
	Worthing	3–2	Newhaven	
Preliminary round replay
R	Woolwich Ordnance	0–1	Ashford Railway Works	
First qualifying round
	Maidstone United	7–0	Ashford Railway Works	
	Margate	0–0	Charlton Athletic	
	Northfleet United	4–1	Sheppey United	
	Worthing	1–1	Folkestone	
First qualifying round replays
R	Charlton Athletic	3–1	Margate	
R	Folkestone	1–1	Worthing	
R2	Worthing	2–1	Folkestone	
Second qualifying round
	Charlton Athletic	1–1	Maidstone United	
	Worthing	0–5	Northfleet United	
Second qualifying round replay
R	Maidstone United	2–0	Charlton Athletic	
Third qualifying round
	Maidstone United	5–0	Northfleet United	

=== Division 22 (Hampshire / Dorset / Isle of Wight) ===
The division comprised 13 teams from which 5 preliminary round ties were drawn, resulting in byes to the first qualifying round for 3 teams: Boscombe, Portsmouth Amateurs and Bournemouth Tramways.

Tie	Home team	Score	Away team	Note
Preliminary round
	Bournemouth Amateurs	3–1	Osborne Athletic	
	Cowes	6–2	Salisbury City	
	East Cowes Victoria Athletic	2–3	Blandford	
	Thornycroft Athletic	2–5	Sholing Athletic	
	Weymouth	2–1	Gosport Athletic	
First qualifying round
	Boscombe	1–1	Blandford	
	Bournemouth Tramways	2–3	Cowes	
	Portsmouth Amateurs	1–3	Bournemouth Amateurs	
	Weymouth	1–1	Sholing Athletic	
First qualifying round replays
R	Blandford	2–1	Boscombe	
R	Sholing Athletic	3–1	Weymouth	
Second qualifying round
	Blandford	2–0	Bournemouth Amateurs	
	Cowes	2–1	Sholing Athletic	
Third qualifying round
	Blandford	2–3	Cowes	

=== Division 23 (Gloucestershire / Bristol / Somerset / Wiltshire) ===
The division comprised 26 teams, of which 20 of the generally smaller teams were drawn into the extra preliminary round to reduce the number to 16 teams required for 8 preliminary round ties.

Tie	Home team	Score	Away team	Note
Extra preliminary round
	Babbacombe	2–1	Frenchay	
	Cheltenham Town	2–2	Melksham & Avon United	†
Match awarded to Cheltenham as Melksham refused to play pre-arranged extra-time
	Chippenham Rovers	1–3	Welton Rovers	
	Clevedon	0–1	Glastonbury	
	Frome Town	3–1	Yeovil & Petters United	
	Paulton Rovers	2–1	Minehead	
	Radstock Town	1–0	Warminster Town	
	Spencer Moulton	4–1	Devizes Town	
	Street	4–3	Torquay Town	§
	Swindon Victoria	3–0	Timsbury Athletic	
Preliminary round
	Bath City	4–2	Welton Rovers	
	Douglas	9–1	Babbacombe	
	Glastonbury'	3–1	Street	
	Hanham Athletic	5–1	Paulton Rovers	
	Radstock Town	0–1	Clandown	
	Spencer Moulton	2–2	Chippenham Town	
	Swindon Victoria	1–1	Frome Town	
	Trowbridge Town F.C.	3–1	Cheltenham Town	§
Preliminary round replays
R	Chippenham Town	2–4	Spencer Moulton	
R	Frome Town	1–3	Swindon Victoria	
First qualifying round
	Clandown	3–1	Glastonbury	
	Douglas	0–4	Bath City	
	Trowbridge Town F.C.	1–1	Hanham Athletic	
	Spencer Moulton	2–3	Swindon Victoria	
First qualifying round replay
R	Hanham Athletic	5–0	Trowbridge Town F.C.	
Second qualifying round
	Bath City	3–0	Hanham Athletic	
	Swindon Victoria	2–0	Clandown	
Third qualifying round
	Bath City	1–1	Swindon Victoria	
Third qualifying round replay
R	Swindon Victoria	2–3	Bath City	

=== Division 24 (South Wales) ===
The division comprised 17 teams, of which 2 of the generally smaller teams were drawn into the extra preliminary round to reduce the number to 16 teams required for 8 preliminary round ties.

Tie	Home team	Score	Away team	Note
Extra preliminary round
	Chepstow Town	6–0	Oakdale	
Preliminary round
	Aberdare Athletic	4–0	Cardiff Albion	
	Bargoed	0–3	Aberaman Athletic	
	Caerau Rovers	2–2	Cardiff Corinthians	
	Chepstow Town	1–3	Abertillery Town	
	Ebbw Vale	7–0	Llanelli Town	
	Mid Rhondda	2–1	Pontypridd Dragons	
	Newport Barbarians	/ – w	Barry	†
Match awarded to Barry Town
	Ton Pentre	10–0	Rogerstone	§
Preliminary round replay
R	Cardiff Corinthians	5–3	Caerau Rovers	
First qualifying round
	Aberaman Athletic	0–2	Barry	
	Aberdare Athletic	2–1	Cardiff Corinthians	
	Abertillery Town	1–0	Ebbw Vale	
	Mid Rhondda	1–0	Ton Pentre	
Second qualifying round
	Abertillery Town	0–2	Aberdare Athletic	
	Mid Rhondda	0–0	Barry	
Second qualifying round replay
R	Barry	1–0	Mid Rhondda	
Third qualifying round
	Aberdare Athletic	2–0	Barry	

== Fourth qualifying round ==
The 24 teams qualifying from the Divisions were joined in the draw by 24 (generally stronger) teams who entered the competition at this stage. The ties were drawn on a regional basis.

Tie	Home team	Score	Away team	Note
	Aberdare Athletic	0–0	Bath City	
	Bishop Auckland	3–2	West Stanley	
	Blyth Spartans	2–0	Scotswood	
	Bromley	2–0	Chatham	
	Buckley United	1–4	Stalybridge Celtic	
	Castleford Town	3–1	Halifax Town	
	Colchester Town	2–2	Ilford	
	Dulwich Hamlet	5–0	Nunhead	
	Durham City	4–1	Barrow	
	Eccles United	2–0	Crewe Alexandra	
	Gillingham	1–0	Maidstone United	
	Hartlepools United	3–0	Houghton	
	Kettering	5–2	Luton Clarence	
	Leytonstone	4–0	Tufnell Park	
	London Caledonians	4–2	Guildford	
	Newport County	0–0	Merthyr Town	
	Nuneaton Town	0–0	Hednesford Town	
	Oxford City	3–0	Hampstead Town	
	Rochdale	1–0	Fleetwood	
	Scunthorpe & Lindsey United	0–1	Mansfield Town	
	Staveley Town	1–3	Worksop Town	
	Thornycrofts (Woolston)	3–1	Cowes	
	Tranmere Rovers	1–0	Southport Central	
	Wycombe Wanderers	3–2	GER Romford	
Fourth qualifying round replays
R	Bath City	2–1	Aberdare Athletic	
R	Hednesford Town	3–2	Nuneaton Town	
R	Ilford	2–0	Colchester Town	
R	Merthyr Town	4–0	Newport County	

== Fifth qualifying round ==
The draw comprised the 24 victorious teams from the previous round. Ties were on a wider regional basis.

Tie	Home team	Score	Away team	Note
	Blyth Spartans	1–0	Durham City	
	Castleford Town	1–1	Hednesford Town	
	Eccles United	2–0	Stalybridge Celtic	
	Gillingham	2–1	Dulwich Hamlet	
	Hartlepools United	A–A	Bishop Auckland	
Match abandoned owing to inclement weather
Re-staged tie
	Hartlepools United	1–1	Bishop Auckland	
	Kettering	2–1	Wycombe Wanderers	
	London Caledonians	0–3	Leytonstone	
	Merthyr Town	0–0	Bath City	
	Oxford City	1–3	Bromley	
	Rochdale	1–0	Tranmere Rovers	
	Thornycrofts (Woolston)	1–0	Ilford	
	Worksop Town	2–2	Mansfield Town	
Fifth qualifying round replays
R	Bath City	1–0	Merthyr Town	
R	Bishop Auckland	0–5	Hartlepools United	
R	Hednesford Town	2–1	Castleford Town	
R	Mansfield Town	3–8	Worksop Town	

== Sixth qualifying round ==
The 12 victorious teams from the previous round were joined in the draw by 12 teams (mostly from Football League Division 2 and Division 3 South) who entered the competition at this stage. Ties were no longer regionally based.

Tie	Home team	Score	Away team	Note
	Bristol Rovers	9–0	Worksop Town	
	Clapton Orient	1–0	Port Vale	
	Coventry City	1–1	Rochdale	
	Darlington	4–0	Blyth Spartans	
	Kettering	2–4	Grimsby Town	
	Leytonstone	1–1	Bath City	
	Lincoln City	5–0	Bromley	
	Northampton Town	3–1	Gillingham	
	Rotherham County	1–3	Luton Town	
	Southend United	3–1	Hednesford Town	
	Swansea Town	3–0	Hartlepools United	
	Thornycrofts (Woolston)	2–3	Eccles United	
Sixth qualifying round replays
R	Bath City	2–0	Leytonstone	
R	Rochdale	2–1	Coventry City	

== 1920–21 FA Cup ==
See 1920–21 FA Cup for details of the rounds from the first round proper onwards.
