= 1919–20 FA Cup qualifying rounds =

Tournament details
- Country: England; Wales

The 1919–20 FA Cup was the 45th season of the world's oldest association football competition, the Football Association Challenge Cup (more usually known as the FA Cup), and the first since the cancellation of all football competitions owing to the First World War.

The qualifying phase of the competition, in which a total of 384 clubs competed, comprised eight rounds: an extra preliminary, preliminary and six sequentially numbered qualifying rounds. Twelve teams progressed from the last of these to the first round proper

== Rounds: draw information ==
For each successive round a draw was made pairing two teams for each tie to be played on the date specified for that round (always a Saturday); the default venue for the match was the home stadium of first of the two teams drawn however this could be switched with agreement between the clubs. For matches where scores were level after ninety minutes of play a replay at the home ground of the team initially drawn as the away team was arranged usually later in the same week; a thirty-minute extra time period was played if the scores were level after ninety minutes. If the replayed match was drawn then further replays, with extra time if necessary, were held at neutral venues until a winner was determined.

Owing to the large number of clubs entering the tournament from lower down the English football league system the competition commenced with an extra preliminary and preliminary rounds. Initially and through to the third qualifying round the draw was arranged into twenty-four geographic based divisions followed by three further qualifying rounds each successively increasing the possible geographic spread of clubs paired in the draw. Additional clubs were added to the draw at the fourth and sixth qualifying stage. Through to the fifth qualifying round the matches were contested by non-League clubs; this changed at the sixth qualifying round when two second division Football League clubs were included in the twelve added to the draw. From the total of 384 clubs who competed in the qualifying phase 12 progressed to the first round proper.

Round	Date Played	Teams from Previous Round	Additional Teams	Total Teams	Ties Played
Extra preliminary round	13 September 1919	–	42	42	21
Preliminary round	27 September 1919*	21	251	272	136
First qualifying round	11 October 1919	136	56	192	96
Second qualifying round	25 October 1919	96	0	96	48
Third qualifying round	8 November 1919	48	0	48	24
Fourth qualifying round	22 November 1919	24	23	47	23
Fifth qualifying round	6 December 19219	24	0	24	12
Sixth qualifying round	20 December 1919	12	12	24	12
*Owing to a railway strike the playing of some preliminary round ties was delayed

Key to notes and abbreviations in the following tables
- Tie
  - Replay – Replay (after first match being a draw)
  - Replay 2, Replay 3 – Second, third replay (usually played on a neutral ground)
- Notes
  - aet – Match result after extra time played
  - void – Result voided (with score shown in brackets), reason as indicated
  - § – In the draw the away team were drawn as the home team
  - † – Win awarded. W: progressing club; x: eliminated club. Reason as indicated

== Extra preliminary to third qualifying round ==
The five rounds from the extra preliminary to the third qualifying involved 349 clubs from England and Wales. These were arranged into 24 geographically based divisions which thereby created matches against local rival clubs and limited the travelling required. Through a series of knock-out matches one team from each division progressed to the fourth qualifying round.

The number of clubs in each division varied: there were twenty-two clubs in division 8 and 11 with twelve teams from each in the extra preliminary round, but only eight clubs in division 14 whose first match in the competition was at the first qualifying round stage.

=== Division 1 (Northumberland / Tyneside / Wearside) ===
The division comprised 20 teams of which 8 were drawn into the extra preliminary round to reduce the number to 16 teams required for 8 preliminary round ties.

The Lintz Institute club, members of the Northern Alliance, who had been the beneficiaries of home draws in each of their four ties progressed from the division to the fourth qualifying round. Following a goalless draw from another home tie in that round they lost in a replay at fellow divisional qualifiers Castleford Town of the Midland League.

Tie	Home team	Score	Away team	Note
Extra preliminary round
	Newbiggin Athletic	1–0	Brighton West End	
	Palmers, Jarrow	3–0	Felling Colliery	
	Usworth Colliery	0–4	Close Works	
	Walker Celtic	3–2	Washington Colliery	
Preliminary round
	Ashington	1–0	Close Works	
	Bedlington United	1–2	Walker Celtic	
	Lintz Institute	1–0	Wallsend BC	
	Mickley	0–1	Blyth Spartans	
	Newbiggin Athletic	1–1	Seaton Delaval	
Replay	Seaton Delaval	1–3	Newbiggin Athletic	
	Newburn	0–3	Palmers, Jarrow	
	Pandon Temperance	1–0	Spen Black & White	
	Rutherford College	1–2	Prudhoe Castle	
First qualifying round
	Ashington	4–0	Pandon Temperance	
	Lintz Institute	3–1	Prudhoe Castle	
	Newbiggin Athletic	1–4	Palmers, Jarrow	
	Walker Celtic	1–2	Blyth Spartans	
Second qualifying round
	Ashington	0–3	Blyth Spartans	
	Lintz Institute	1–0	Palmers, Jarrow	
Third qualifying round
	Lintz Institute	1–0	Blyth Spartans	

=== Division 2 (County Durham / Tyneside / Wearside) ===
The 16 teams included in the division were drawn into 8 preliminary round ties.

Leadgate Park, members of the North Eastern League, who had been drawn at home in each of their four ties progressed from the division to the fourth qualifying round. They were drawn as the away team in the next two rounds and were eliminated from the competition in the fifth qualifying round at fellow North Eastern League club West Stanley.

Tie	Home team	Score	Away team	Note
Preliminary round
	Birtley	3–3	Horden Athletic	
Replay	Horden Athletic	1–0	Birtley	
	Boldon Colliery	1–0	Craghead Heroes	
	Dipton United	1–2	Houghton	
	Hobson Wanderers	1–5	Durham City	
	Leadgate Park	W–x	South Pontop Villa (scratched)	†
	Ryhope Comrades	0–1	Annfield Plain	
	Seaham Harbour	3–1	Esh Winning	
	Sunderland West End	4–0	Chopwell Institute	
First qualifying round
	Horden Athletic	1–3	Houghton	
	Leadgate Park	2–1	Durham City	
	Seaham Harbour	2–0	Annfield Plain	
	Sunderland West End	5–0	Boldon Colliery	
Second qualifying round
	Leadgate Park	4–1	Sunderland West End	
	Seaham Harbour	1–1	Houghton	
Replay	Houghton	1–2	Seaham Harbour	
Third qualifying round
	Leadgate Park	2–1	Seaham Harbour	

=== Division 3 (County Durham / North Yorkshire) ===
The division comprised 15 teams of which 14 were drawn into 7 preliminary round ties with the remaining team, Eston United, receiving a bye to the first qualifying round.

South Bank, members of the Northern League, progressed from the division to the fourth qualifying round in which they were defeated at North Eastern League club Darlington.

Tie	Home team	Score	Away team	Note
Preliminary round
	Brotton	3–2	Redcar	
	Crook Town	2–0	Darlington Rlwy Athletic	
	Grangetown St Mary's	1–2	Spennymoor United	
	Rise Carr	W–x	Scarborough (scratched)	†
	Shildon Athletic	(1–0)	Stanley United	void
	Appeal upheld that no time was added for in-game stoppages			void
Replay	Shildon Athletic	4–3	Stanley United	
	South Bank	4–1	Loftus Albion	
	Willington	1–0	St Helens Utd (Auckland)	
First qualifying round
	Brotton	0–2	Crook Town	
	Eston United	2–5	Rise Carr	
	South Bank	3–2	Willington	
	Spennymoor United	1–1	Shildon Athletic	
Replay	Shildon Athletic	2–1	Spennymoor United	
Second qualifying round
	Crook Town	1–2	Shildon Athletic	
	Rise Carr	0–2	South Bank	
Third qualifying round
	South Bank	3–1	Shildon Athletic	

=== Division 4 (Cumbria) ===
The division comprised 9 teams from which 2, Barrow Shipbuiders and Kells White Star, were drawn into a preliminary round tie with the other 7 teams receiving byes to the first qualifying round.

Carlisle United, members of the North Eastern League, progressed from the division to the fourth qualifying round in which they were victorious before defeat in the next round at Lancashire Combination club South Liverpool.

Tie	Home team	Score	Away team	Note
Preliminary round
	Barrow Shipbuiders	1–2	Kells White Star	
First qualifying round
	Carlisle United	8–1	Wigton Harriers	§
	Penrith	1–3	Cleator Moor Celtic	
	Vickerstown	0–5	Kells White Star	
	Wath Brow United	1–3	Frizington Athletic	
Second qualifying round
	Carlisle United	6–1	Cleator Moor Celtic	
	Kells White Star	1–3	Frizington Athletic	
Third qualifying round
	Carlisle United	1–0	Frizington Athletic	

=== Division 5 (Lancashire) ===
The division comprised 12 teams from which 8 were drawn into preliminary round ties resulting in byes to the first qualifying round for 4 teams: Chorley, Great Harwood, Horwich RMI and Leyland.

Horwich RMI, members of the Lancashire Combination, who were drawn as the away team in their three qualifying round matches (winning a home replay in the last), progressed from the division to the fourth qualifying round. Drawn away once again in the next round they were defeated by Lancashire Combination rivals Stalybridge Celtic.

Tie	Home team	Score	Away team	Note
Preliminary round
	Dick, Kerr	W–x	Kirkham & Wesham (defunct)	†
	Fleetwood	4–5	Hamilton Central	
	Nelson	2–1	Accrington Stanley	
	Portsmouth Rovers	0–3	Breightmet United	
First qualifying round
	Great Harwood	0–1	Chorley	§
	Hamilton Central	1–0	Breightmet United	
	Leyland	3–1	Dick, Kerr	
	Nelson	0–1	Horwich RMI	
Second qualifying round
	Hamilton Central	0–1	Horwich RMI	
	Leyland	0–0	Chorley	§
Replay	Leyland	0–1	Chorley	aet
Third qualifying round
	Chorley	1–1	Horwich RMI	
Replay	Horwich RMI	4–0	Chorley	

=== Division 6 (Lancashire / Cheshire / Derbyshire) ===
The division comprised 10 teams of which 4 were drawn into 2 preliminary round ties with the remaining 6 teams receiving byes to the first qualifying round.

Monks, Hall (a club associated with the Monks, Hall Ironworks at Warrington), members of the Cheshire County League, who had been one of the four teams drawn into the division's preliminary round and had been drawn as the away team in each of their four divisional matches (winning a home replay in the last) progressed to the fourth qualifying round. They were drawn as the away team once again in that round and defeated by Rochdale of the Central League.

Tie	Home team	Score	Away team	Note
Preliminary round
	Runcorn	4–1	Congleton Town	
	Widnes DS&S	1–4	Monks, Hall	
First qualifying round
	Glossop	1–1	Altrincham	
Replay	Altrincham	5–4	Glossop	aet
	Macclesfield	1–2	Garston Gasworks	§
	Monks, Hall	2–2	Hurst	
Replay	Hurst	3–5	Monks, Hall	
	Runcorn	7–0	Sandbach Ramblers	§
Second qualifying round
	Altrincham	1–2	Monks, Hall	
	Garston Gasworks	0–1	Runcorn	
Third qualifying round
	Runcorn	2–2	Monks, Hall	
Replay	Monks, Hall	1–0	Runcorn	

=== Division 7 (Liverpool / Cheshire / North Wales) ===
The division comprised 14 teams of which 12 were drawn into the preliminary round with the remaining two teams, Crewe Alexandra and Tranmere Rovers, receiving byes to the first qualifying round.

South Liverpool, members of the Lancashire Combination, progressed from the division to the fourth qualifying round. After victories in the next two rounds (which included a second replay match played at Anfield) they were eliminated in the sixth qualifying round by Central League club Rochdale.

Tie	Home team	Score	Away team	Note
Preliminary round
	Harrowby	0–1	Lostock Gralam	
	Nantwich Town	5–0	Chester	
	South Liverpool	7–2	Northern Nomads	
	Wallasey Borough	0–2	Marlborough Old Boys	
	Winsford United	2–0	Northwich Victoria	
	Witton Albion	2–2	Wrexham	
Replay	Wrexham	3–2	Witton Albion	aet
First qualifying round
	Crewe Alexandra	1–0	Tranmere Rovers	
	Lostock Gralam	3–1	Nantwich Town	
	South Liverpool	3–0	Winsford United	
	Wrexham	8–0	Marlborough Old Boys	
Second qualifying round
	Crewe Alexandra	3–3	Wrexham	
Replay	Wrexham	0–1	Crewe Alexandra	
	South Liverpool	4–1	Lostock Gralam	
Third qualifying round
	Crewe Alexandra	1–3	South Liverpool	

=== Division 8 (Staffordshire / Birmingham / Worcestershire / Warwickshire) ===
The division comprised 22 teams of which 12 of which were drawn into the extra preliminary round to reduce the number to 16 teams required for 8 preliminary round ties.

Hednesford Town, members of the Birmingham & District League, who won through five rounds having joined the competition at the extra preliminary stage progressed from the division to the fourth qualifying round. The club were one of only two clubs who had played at the initial stage of the competition and won through eight rounds to progress to the first round proper where they were defeated in their eleventh match in the competition by Castleford Town of the Midland League – who themselves had progressed from the preliminary round.

Tie	Home team	Score	Away team	Note
Extra preliminary round
	Bloxwich Strollers	0–0	Wellington Town	
Replay	Wellington Town	4–0	Bloxwich Strollers	
	Darlaston	5–1	Talbot Stead	
	Hednesford Town	5–3	Halesowen	
	Kidderminster Harriers	4–0	Redditch	
	Tamworth Castle	3–3	Nuneaton Town	
Replay	Nuneaton Town	2–3	Tamworth Castle	
	Wednesbury Old Athletic	1–3	Cradley Heath St Luke's	
Preliminary round
	Bilston United	1–0	Tamworth Castle	
	Birmingham Corp.Tramways	1–2	Brierley Hill Alliance	
	Darlaston	4–1	Rugby Town	
	Hednesford Town	5–0	Atherstone Town	§
	Stafford Rangers	4–2	Kidderminster Harriers	
	Stourbridge	3–3	Cradley Heath St Luke's	
Replay	Cradley Heath St Luke's	3–2	Stourbridge	
	Wellington Town	4–1	Bromsgrove Rovers	
	Willenhall	5–1	Cannock Town	
First qualifying round
	Bilston United	1–1	Wellington Town	
Replay	Wellington Town	3–1	Bilston United	
	Brierley Hill Alliance	0–1	Darlaston	
	Cradley Heath St Luke's	2–1	Stafford Rangers	
	Hednesford Town	3–2	Willenhall	
Second qualifying round
	Darlaston	2–1	Wellington Town	
	Hednesford Town	5–2	Cradley Heath St Luke's	
Third qualifying round
	Darlaston	3–3	Hednesford Town	
Replay	Hednesford Town	2–1	Darlaston	

=== Division 9 (East Riding of Yorkshire / North Lincolnshire) ===
The 16 teams included in the division were drawn into 8 preliminary round ties.

Cleethorpes Town, members of the Grimsby League, who were drawn as the away team in each of their four divisional matches (winning a home replay in the last) progressed to the fourth qualifying round. Following a victory from another away tie in the next round they were then defeated in their first home draw match of the competition (played at local Blundell Park) by Midland League club Castleford Town.

Tie	Home team	Score	Away team	Note
Preliminary round
	Bentley Colliery Welfare	W–x	Bullcroft Main Colliery (scratched)	†
	Beverley Town	2–1	Goole Chevrons	
	Brigg	0–14	Cleethorpes Town	
	Frodingham Iron & Steel Ath.	0–2	Brodsworth Main	
	Gainsborough Trinity	4–0	Hull Old Boys	§
	Grimsby Rovers	3–1	Grimsby Haycroft Rovers	
	Humber Graving Dock	W–x	National Radiator Co.(scratched)	†
	Scunthorpe & Lindsey United	7–0	Goole Town	
First qualifying round
	Gainsborough Trinity	2–0	Bentley Colliery Welfare	
	Grimsby Rovers	2–4	Cleethorpes Town	
	Humber Graving Dock	5–0	Beverley Town	
	Scunthorpe & Lindsey United	2–1	Brodsworth Main	
Second qualifying round
	Gainsborough Trinity	4–0	Humber Graving Dock	
	Scunthorpe & Lindsey United	0–1	Cleethorpes Town	
Third qualifying round
	Gainsborough Trinity	1–1	Cleethorpes Town	
Replay	Cleethorpes Town	4–0	Gainsborough Trinity	@Blundell Park

=== Division 10 (West Riding of Yorkshire and York district) ===
The 16 teams included in the division were drawn into 8 preliminary round ties. All fourteen decisive matches played in the division (of which two were replays) were home club wins – the other result being a home replay walkover.

Castleford Town, members of the Midland League, who had been drawn at home in each of their four divisional ties progressed from the division to the fourth qualifying round. They won through the next three qualifying rounds to reach the first round proper in which they defeated another qualifying division winning club Hednesford Town before losing in the second round at fellow Yorkshire club Bradford Park Avenue of the Football League First Division.

Tie	Home team	Score	Away team	Note
Preliminary round
	Acomb WMC (York)	1–1	Frickley Colliery	
Replay	Frickley Colliery	W–x	Acomb WMC (York) (scratched)	†
	Boothtown	3–3	Harrogate	
Replay	Harrogate	3–0	Boothtown	
	Castleford Town	3–1	Calverley	
	Halifax Town	7–0	Apperley Bridge	§
	Leeds Steel Works	4–2	Hebden Bridge	
	Rothwell Athletic	2–1	Horsforth	
	Rothwell Parish Church	1–0	Glasshoughton Colliery	
	South Kirkby Colliery	5–0	Rowntrees	
First qualifying round
	Castleford Town	3–0	Halifax Town	
	Frickley Colliery	3–1	Rothwell Athletic	
	Harrogate	1–1	South Kirkby Colliery	
Replay	South Kirkby Colliery	4–0	Harrogate	
	Leeds Steel Works	4–2	Rothwell Parish Church	
Second qualifying round
	Castleford Town	6–0	Leeds Steel Works	
	South Kirkby Colliery	4–2	Frickley Colliery	
Third qualifying round
	Castleford Town	2–0	South Kirkby Colliery	

=== Division 11 (South Yorkshire) ===
The division comprised 22 teams of which 12 were drawn into the extra preliminary round to reduce the number to 16 teams required for 8 preliminary round ties.

Rotherham Town, members of the Midland League, progressed from the division to the fourth qualifying round and following victory there reached the fifth qualifying round where they were defeated at Loughborough Corinthians of the Central Alliance.

Tie	Home team	Score	Away team	Note
Extra preliminary round
	Darfield St George's	4–0	Kilnhurst United	
	Dearne	3–1	Prospect United	
	Denaby United	1–4	Mexborough	
	Doncaster Plant Works	5–2	Conisbrough Athletic	
	Rotherham Amateurs	1–2	Kimberworth Old Boys	
	Sheffield-Simplex Works	1–3	Thurnscoe Park Avenue	
Preliminary round
	Darfield St George's	3–2	Worksop Town	
	Dearne	2–0	Atlas & Norfolk Works	
	Grimethorpe Colliery Institute	6–0	Parkgate Works Sports	
	Kimberworth Old Boys	1–0	Wath Athletic	
	Rotherham Town	2–1	Sheffield	
	Silverwood Colliery	6–0	Doncaster Plant Works	
	Tankersley	6–1	Tinsley Park	
	Thurnscoe Park Avenue	0–2	Mexborough	
First qualifying round
	Darfield St George's	0–1	Mexborough	
	Grimethorpe Colliery Institute	2–1	Silverwood Colliery	
	Rotherham Town	4–2	Dearne	
	Tankersley	1–4	Kimberworth Old Boys	
Second qualifying round
	Kimberworth Old Boys	3–0	Grimethorpe Colliery Institute	
	Rotherham Town	2–0	Mexborough	
Third qualifying round
	Rotherham Town	0–0	Kimberworth Old Boys	§
Replay	Rotherham Town	5–4	Kimberworth Old Boys	

=== Division 12 (Derbyshire) ===
The division comprised 9 teams: two, Chesterfield Municipal and Clay Cross Town, were drawn into a single preliminary round tie and the winner progressed to the first qualifying round joining the remaining seven teams.

Staveley Town, of the Derbyshire Senior League, progressed from the division to the fourth qualifying round in which they were heavily defeated in a home replay by Midland League club Rotherham Town.

Tie	Home team	Score	Away team	Note
Preliminary round
	Chesterfield Municipal	4–0	Clay Cross Town	
First qualifying round
	Chesterfield Municipal	2–1	Ilkeston United	
	Eckington Red Rose	0–1	Bolsover Colliery	
	South Normanton Colliery	2–1	Long Eaton	
	Staveley Town	7–0	Dronfield Woodhouse	
Second qualifying round
	Bolsover Colliery	0–1	Staveley Town	
	Chesterfield Municipal	(5–0)	South Normanton Colliery	§ void
	Chesterfield Municipal disqualified for playing an ineligible player			§ void
Third qualifying round
	South Normanton Colliery	1–1	Staveley Town	
Replay	Staveley Town	0–0	South Normanton Colliery	aet
Replay 2	South Normanton Colliery	0–2	Staveley Town	aet @Chesterfield

=== Division 13 (Nottinghamshire and adjacent towns) ===
The division comprised a total of 16 teams, 14 from Nottinghamshire plus Grantham (from Lincolnshire) and Shirebrook (from Derbyshire), all drawn into 8 preliminary round ties.

Sutton Town, members of the Central Alliance, progressed from the division to the fourth qualifying round in which they were defeated at another Central Alliance club, Loughborough Corinthians.

Tie	Home team	Score	Away team	Note
Preliminary round
	Arnold St Mary's	0–4	Grantham	
	Boots Athletic	2–1	Netherfield Rangers	
	Ericssons Athletic	2–3	Basford United	
	Hucknall Byron	1–1	Sutton Town	
Replay	Sutton Town	5–1	Hucknall Byron	
	New Hucknall Colliery	5–4	Rufford Colliery	
	Shirebrook	3–1	Mansfield Town	
	Sneinton	2–3	Newark	
	Sutton Junction (disqualified)	(3–3)	Welbeck Colliery	void
	Match curtailed after Sutton Junction players prevented taking of a penalty kick			void
First qualifying round
	Basford United	1–5	Sutton Town	
	Grantham	2–2	Boots Athletic	
Replay	Boots Athletic	2–2	Grantham	aet
Replay 2	Grantham	2–0	Boots Athletic	@Meadow Lane
	New Hucknall Colliery	4–0	Newark	
	Welbeck Colliery	3–1	Shirebrook	
Second qualifying round
	Grantham	3–4	Sutton Town	
	Welbeck Colliery	2–2	New Hucknall Colliery	
Replay	New Hucknall Colliery	W–x	Welbeck Colliery (disqualified)	†
Replay	Match abandoned after Welbeck Colliery refused to start second half owing to heavy rainfall			†
Third qualifying round
	Sutton Town	4–1	New Hucknall Colliery	

=== Division 14 (Leicestershire / south Derbyshire) ===
The division comprised eight teams (the smallest of the early qualifying divisions) who were all based in Leicestershire except for Gresley Rovers (from neighbouring southern Derbyshire); they all commenced in the competition at the first qualifying round stage.

Loughborough Corinthians, members of the Central Alliance, progressed from the division to the fourth qualifying round and following victories in the next two rounds reached the sixth qualifying round where they were defeated by Port Vale who had recently joined the Football League Second Division.

Tie	Home team	Score	Away team	Note
First qualifying round
	Coalville Swifts	8–0	Ashbourne Town	
	Coalville Town	0–6	Gresley Rovers	
	Hinckley United	4–2	Whitwick Imperial	
	Loughborough Corinthians	9–1	Loughborough Brush Works	
Second qualifying round
	Hinckley United	0–1	Coalville Swifts	
	Loughborough Corinthians	3–2	Gresley Rovers	
Third qualifying round
	Loughborough Corinthians	2–0	Coalville Swifts	

=== Division 15 (South Lincolnshire / Northamptonshire / Bedford) ===
The division comprised 9 teams of which 2, Brotherhoods Works and Bourne Town, were drawn into the preliminary round to reduce the number to 8 teams required for 4 first qualifying round ties.

Desborough Town, of the Northamptonshire League, who did not concede a goal in any of their three three qualifying round matches progressed from the division to the fourth qualifying round in which they were defeated by qualifying division nine winners Cleethorpes Town.

Tie	Home team	Score	Away team	Note
Preliminary round
	Brotherhoods Works	1–0	Bourne Town	
First qualifying round
	Bedford Town	1–6	Kettering	
	Brotherhoods Works (disqualified)	(1–0)	Stamford Town	void
	Desborough Town	6–0	Wellingborough Town	
	Fletton United	2–0	Boston	
Second qualifying round
	Fletton United	0–1	Desborough Town	
	Stamford Town	0–2	Kettering	
Third qualifying round
	Desborough Town	1–0	Kettering	

=== Division 16 (Norfolk / Suffolk / Cambridgeshire / Essex) ===
The division comprised 12 teams from which 4 preliminary round ties were drawn, resulting in byes to the first qualifying round for 4 teams; Cambridge Town, Colchester Town, Cromer and King's Lynn.

East Anglian League club King's Lynn progressed from the division to the fourth qualifying round in which as an indirect consequence of the expulsion of Leeds City from the Football League Second Division they were recipients of a bye to the fifth qualifying round – in which they were heavily defeated at Isthmian League club London Caledonians.

Tie	Home team	Score	Away team	Note
Preliminary round
	Gorleston	1–0	Morton's Athletic	
	Great Yarmouth Town	1–2	Norwich CEYMS	
	King's Lynn D&DS	1–2	Norwich D&DS	§ @The Walks
	Leiston Works Athletic	0–1	Lowestoft Town	
First qualifying round
	Cambridge Town	3–0	Norwich D&DS	
	Colchester Town	2–0	Gorleston	
	Lowestoft Town	1–1	Cromer	
Replay	Cromer	3–1	Lowestoft Town	
	Norwich CEYMS	2–6	King's Lynn	
Second qualifying round
	Colchester Town	1–1	Cambridge Town	
Replay	Cambridge Town	5–2	Colchester Town	
	King's Lynn	3–1	Cromer	
Third qualifying round
	King's Lynn	6–2	Cambridge Town	

=== Division 17 (Essex / East London) ===
The division comprised 13 teams from which 5 preliminary round ties were drawn, resulting in byes to the first qualifying round for three teams: Chelmsford, Leytonstone and 1st Battalion Grenadier Guards.

Gnome Athletic, members of the South Essex League, progressed from the division to the fourth qualifying round. Following home replay wins in each of the next two rounds of the competition they were unable to repeat that feat in the sixth qualifying round and were defeated in a home replay by Birmingham & District League club Hednesford Town.

Tie	Home team	Score	Away team	Note
Preliminary round
	GER Romford	0–3	Custom House	
	Gnome Athletic	2–1	Woodford Crusaders	
	Jurgens (scratched)	x–W	Shoeburyness Garrison	†
	Leyton	1–4	Hoffmanns Ath. (Chelmsfd.)	
	Newportonians	1–5	Walthamstow Grange	
First qualifying round
	Custom House	0–1	Chelmsford	
	Gnome Athletic	8–1	1st Batt. Grenadier Guards	
	Leytonstone	3–0	Walthamstow Grange	
	Shoeburyness Garrison	1–2	Hoffmanns Ath. (Chelmsfd.)	
Second qualifying round
	Chelmsford	0–3	Leytonstone	
	Gnome Athletic	7–0	Hoffmanns Ath. (Chelmsfd.)	
Third qualifying round
	Leytonstone	0–4	Gnome Athletic	

=== Division 18 (Bedfordshire / Buckinghamshire / Hertfordshire / North London) ===
The division comprised 12 teams from which 4 preliminary round ties were drawn, resulting in byes to the first qualifying round for 4 teams; Enfield, Luton Clarence, St Albans City and Tufnell Park.

Chesham United, members of the Spartan League, who did not concede a goal in their four divisional matches progressed to the fourth qualifying round in which they were defeated at Isthmian League club London Caledonians.

Tie	Home team	Score	Away team	Note
Preliminary round
	Barnet & Alston	1–0	Cheshunt	
	Chesham United	6–0	Tufnell Spartans	
	Islington Town	2–0	Page Green Old Boys	
	Leavesden Mental Hospital	1–0	Waterlow's Amateurs	
First qualifying round
	Enfield	0–1	Chesham United	
	Leavesden Mental Hospital	2–0	Tufnell Park	
	Luton Clarence	5–0	Islington Town	
	St Albans City	1–0	Barnet & Alston	
Second qualifying round
	Leavesden Mental Hospital	0–2	Chesham United	
	St Albans City	0–0	Luton Clarence	
Replay	Luton Clarence	3–2	St Albans City	
Third qualifying round
	Luton Clarence	0–3	Chesham United	

=== Division 19 (Berkshire / Buckinghamshire / Oxfordshire / Middlesex) ===
The division comprised 15 teams from which 7 preliminary round ties were drawn, resulting in a bye to the first qualifying round for Marlow.

Hampstead Town, of the Athenian League, who had been drawn at home in each of their four divisional matches progressed to the fourth qualifying round in which, following a draw in a further home tie, they were beaten in a replay at South Essex League club Gnome Athletic.

Tie	Home team	Score	Away team	Note
Preliminary round
	Hammersmith Comrades	2–3	Handley Page	
	Hampstead Town	3–1	Southall	
	Maidenhead United	12–1	Henley	
	Newbury Town	6–0	Uxbridge Town	
	Windsor & Eton	2–1	Botwell Mission	
	Wycombe Wanderers	5–2	Reading United	
	Yiewsley	0–11	Slough	
First qualifying round
	Hampstead Town	4–1	Marlow	
	Slough	8–2	Newbury Town	
	Windsor & Eton	5–0	Handley Page	
	Wycombe Wanderers	2–1	Maidenhead United	
Second qualifying round
	Hampstead Town	3–0	Windsor & Eton	
	Wycombe Wanderers	3–3	Slough	
Replay	Slough	4–5	Wycombe Wanderers	aet
Third qualifying round
	Hampstead Town	4–1	Wycombe Wanderers	

=== Division 20 (Surrey / South London) ===
The division comprised 16 teams who all played in the preliminary round.

Guildford, members of the Southern Suburban League, who had been drawn at home in each of their four divisional ties (although requiring an away replay to win their preliminary round tie) progressed from the division to the fourth qualifying round in which they were defeated at Athenian League club Bromley.

Tie	Home team	Score	Away team	Note
Preliminary round
	Aquarius	2–2	Walton-on-Thames	
Replay	Walton-on-Thames	4–1	Aquarius	
	Camberley & Yorktown	3–1	Redhill	
	Croydon	3–4	Burberry Athletic	
	Guards Depot'	1–5	Sutton United	
	Guildford	1–1	Woking	
Replay	Woking	2–11	Guildford	
	Kingstonians	3–1	West Norwood	§
	Tooting Town	0–0	Summerstown	
Replay	Summerstown	3–0	Tooting Town	
	Wimbledon	7–0	Pearl Assurance	
First qualifying round
	Camberley & Yorktown	1–3	Summerstown	
	Guildford	7–1	Kingstonians	
	Sutton United	3–0	Burberry Athletic	
	Wimbledon	3–0	Walton-on-Thames	
Second qualifying round
	Guildford	2–1	Summerstown	
	Wimbledon	2–0	Sutton United	
Third qualifying round
	Guildford	2–1	Wimbledon	

=== Division 21 (Kent / Sussex / South-East London) ===
The division comprised 17 teams of which two, Brompton and Ordnance (Woolwich), were drawn into an extra preliminary round tie to reduce the number to 16 teams required for 8 preliminary round ties.

Sheppey United, members of the Kent League, who had been drawn away in each of their four divisional ties (subsequently winning two home replays) progressed from the division to the fourth qualifying round. Victories from two further ties drawn as the away team (one won in a home replay) saw the club paired again as the away club in the sixth qualifying round in which they were defeated by Thornycrofts (Woolston) of the Hampshire League.

Tie	Home team	Score	Away team	Note
Extra preliminary round
	Ordnance (Woolwich)	3–3	Brompton	
Replay	Brompton	1–3	Ordnance (Woolwich)	
Preliminary round
	Lewes	3–6	Worthing	
	Maidstone United	2–0	Ashford Railway Works	§
	Margate	12–1	Deal Cinque Ports	
	Northfleet United	4–2	Catford Southend	
	Ordnance (Woolwich)	2–1	Woolwich Polytechnic	§
	Sittingbourne	7–2	Charlton Athletic	
	Tunbridge Wells Rangers	2–2	Sheppey United	
Replay	Sheppey United	7–1	Tunbridge Wells Rangers	
	Whitstable Town	2–0	Folkestone	
First qualifying round
	Maidstone United	0–0	Sheppey United	
Replay	Sheppey United	2–1	Maidstone United	
	Northfleet United	7–2	Margate	
	Ordnance (Woolwich)	6–0	Whitstable Town	
	Worthing	2–2	Sittingbourne	
Replay	Sittingbourne	4–2	Worthing	
Second qualifying round
	Ordnance (Woolwich)	1–3	Northfleet United	
	Sittingbourne	0–3	Sheppey United	
Third qualifying round
	Northfleet United	3–4	Sheppey United	

=== Division 22 (Hampshire / Isle of Wight / Dorset / Wiltshire) ===
The division comprised 17 teams of which 2, RAE Farnborough and Thornycrofts (Woolston), were drawn into an extra preliminary round tie to reduce the number to 16 teams required for 8 preliminary round ties.

Thornycrofts (Woolston), members of the Hampshire League, who joined the competition at the extra preliminary stage and had won through five rounds progressed from the division to the fourth qualifying round. Following three more victories (from two away and one home tie) they were one of only two clubs to have played in every round to reach the first round proper of the competition where they were paired with high flying Football League First Division club Burnley: the initial home tie, moved to Fratton Park, was a goalless draw before a defeat in the replay at Burnley – Thornycofts' eleventh match in the competition.

Tie	Home team	Score	Away team	Note
Extra Preliminary round
	Thornycrofts (Woolston)	4–0	RAE Farnborough	
Preliminary round
	Boscombe	9–0	Poole & St Mary's	
	Bournemouth	W–x	Longfleet St. Mary's (defunct – merged with Poole)	†
	East Cowes Victoria	2–2	Cowes	
Replay	Cowes	5–2	East Cowes Victoria	
	Eastleigh Athletic	0–2	Basingstoke	
	Portsmouth Amateurs	15–0	White & Co's Sports	
	Thornycroft (Basingstoke)	1–1	Salisbury	
Replay	Salisbury	0–4	Thornycroft (Basingstoke)	
	Thornycrofts (Woolston)	5–0	Bournemouth Gasworks Athletic	
	Weymouth	1–3	Bournemouth Tramways	
First qualifying round
	Basingstoke	1–0	Boscombe	
	Bournemouth	0–6	Bournemouth Tramways	
	Thornycroft (Basingstoke)	0–5	Portsmouth Amateurs	§
	Thornycrofts (Woolston)	7–3	Cowes	
Second qualifying round
	Bournemouth Tramways	2–0	Portsmouth Amateurs	§
	Thornycrofts (Woolston)	5–1	Basingstoke	
Third qualifying round
	Bournemouth Tramways	0–0	Thornycrofts (Woolston)	@Dean Court
Replay	Thornycrofts (Woolston)	3–1	Bournemouth Tramways	

=== Division 23 (Gloucestershire / Bristol / Somerset / Wiltshire) ===
The division comprised 19 teams of which 6 were drawn into the extra preliminary round to reduce the number to 16 teams required for 8 preliminary round ties.

Bath City, members of the Western League, progressed from the division to the fourth qualifying round in which they were defeated at Southern Football League Welsh club Newport County.

Tie	Home team	Score	Away team	Note
Extra preliminary round
	Devizes Town	1–2	Clandown	
	Melksham Town	1–1	Timsbury Athletic	
Replay	Timsbury Athletic	3–2	Melksham Town	
	Welton Rovers	2–1	Douglas	
Preliminary round
	Bath City	4–4	Yeovil & Petters United	
Replay	Yeovil & Petters United	1–2	Bath City	
	Chippenham Town	4–0	Cheltenham Town	
	Clandown	4–0	Swindon Victoria	
	Minehead	1–3	Hanham Athletic	
	Street	4–0	Frome Town	
	Timsbury Athletic	2–0	Paulton Rovers	
	Trowbridge Town	2–0	Peasdown St. John's	
	Welton Rovers	2–1	Clevedon	
First qualifying round
	Clandown	0–0	Street	
Replay	Street	0–1	Clandown	
	Timsbury Athletic	3–3	Hanham Athletic	
Replay	Hanham Athletic	1–0	Timsbury Athletic	
	Trowbridge Town	5–0	Chippenham Town	
	Welton Rovers	1–4	Bath City	
Second qualifying round
	Hanham Athletic	2–4	Clandown	
	Trowbridge Town	1–2	Bath City	
Third qualifying round
	Clandown	2–2	Bath City	
Replay	Bath City	3–1	Clandown	

=== Division 24 (South Wales) ===
The division comprised 14 teams of which 12 were drawn into the preliminary round with the remaining two teams, Cardiff Corinthians and Newport Barbarians, receiving byes to the first qualifying round.

Ton Pentre, members of the Southern League, who had been drawn at home for each of their four ties progressed from the division to the fourth qualifying round in which they were defeated, playing at home again, by league rivals Merthyr Town.

Tie	Home team	Score	Away team	Note
Preliminary round
	Aberdare (defunct)	x–W	Mid Rhondda	†
	Bargoed & District	2–0	Abertillery	
	Ebbw Vale	1–1	Barry	
Replay	Barry	0–2	Ebbw Vale	
	Pontypridd	3–0	Rhiwderin	
	Rogerstone	1–6	Llanelli	
	Ton Pentre	3–0	Caerau Rovers	
First qualifying round
	Cardiff Corinthians	2–0	Newport Barbarians	
	Llanelli	1–0	Bargoed & District	
	Mid Rhondda	3–0	Ebbw Vale	
	Ton Pentre	3–1	Pontypridd	
Second qualifying round
	Cardiff Corinthians	0–4	Mid Rhondda	
	Ton Pentre	5–2	Llanelli	
Third qualifying round
	Ton Pentre	2–1	Mid Rhondda	

== Fourth qualifying round ==
Owing to the demise of Leeds City and the subsequent advancement of the exemption for Reading from the sixth qualifying round to the first round proper and Southend United from the fourth to the sixth qualifying round only 23 additional (all non-League) clubs joined the 24 teams from the qualifying divisions (identified in the results schedule below by the inclusion of their divisional number) to make a total of 47 clubs in the fourth qualifying round draw – from which King's Lynn were recipients of a bye to the fifth qualifying round. The 23 competitive ties were drawn on a regional basis: five comprised divisional winning clubs competing against each other, five were between clubs just added to the draw and the remaining thirteen between clubs that were a mixture of the two.

In addition to King's Lynn of the 23 victorious clubs progressing to the fifth qualifying round eleven had won through the divisional qualifying sections – six of which had beaten clubs added to the draw in this round.

Key to the leagues in which the clubs competed (appended in the results table below)

- AL – Athenian League
- BL – Birmingham & District League
- CA – Central Alliance
- CCL – Cheshire County League
- CL – Central League
- DSL – Derbyshire Senior League
- EAL – East Anglian League
- FL2 – Football League Second Division
- GrL – Grimsby & District League
- HL – Hampshire League
- IL – Isthmian League
- KL – Kent League

- LC – Lancashire Combination
- ML – Midland League
- NA – Northern Alliance
- NEL – North Eastern League
- NL – Northern League
- NoL – Northamptonshire League
- SEL – South Essex League
- SL – Southern League
- SpL – Spartan League
- SSL – Southern Suburban League
- WL – Western League

(Numbers prefaced by Q indicate where appropriate the club's qualifying division)

Tie	Home team	Score	Away team	Note
	Barrow (LC)	0–0	Carlisle United (Q4) (NEL)	
Replay	Carlisle United (Q4) (NEL)	2–0	Barrow (LC)	
	Bishop Auckland (NL)	1–0	Hartlepools United (NEL)	
	Bromley (AL)	1–0	Guildford (Q20) (SSL)	
	Clapton (IL)	3–2	Chatham (KL)	
	Darlington (NEL)	4–2	South Bank (Q3) (NL)	
	Desborough Town (Q15) (NoL)	1–2	Cleethorpes Town (Q9) (GrL)	
	Dulwich Hamlet (IL)	1–0	Nunhead (IL)	
	Hampstead Town (Q19) (AL)	1–1	Gnome Athletic (Q17) (SEL)	
Replay	Gnome Athletic (Q17) (SEL)	2–0	Hampstead Town (Q19) (AL)	
	Ilford (IL)	1–3	Sheppey United (Q21) (KL)	
	King's Lynn (Q16) (EAL)	bye		
	Lintz Institute (Q1) (NA)	0–0	Castleford Town (Q10) (ML)	
Replay	Castleford Town (Q10) (ML)	1–0	Lintz Institute (Q1) (NA)	
	London Caledonians (IL)	3–1	Chesham United (Q18) (SpL)	
	Loughborough Corinthians (Q14) (CA)	3–0	Sutton Town (Q13) (CA)	
	Newport County (SL)	5–2	Bath City (Q23) (WL)	
	Oxford City (IL)	1–2	Thornycrofts (Woolston) (Q22) (HL)	
	Rochdale (CL)	1–0	Monks, Hall (Q6) (CCL)	
	Rotherham Town (Q11) (ML)	2–2	Staveley Town (Q12) (DSL)	
Replay	Staveley Town (Q12) (DSL)	1–7	Rotherham Town (Q11) (ML)	
	Shrewsbury Town (BL)	0–8	Hednesford (Q8) (BL)	
	Southport (CL)	(1–0)	South Liverpool (Q7) (LC)	void
	Southport played an ineligible player, match replayed			void
Replay	South Liverpool (Q7) (LC)	1–1	Southport (CL)	aet
Replay 2	Southport (CL)	0–2	South Liverpool (Q7) (LC)	@Anfield
	Stalybridge Celtic (LC)	4–2	Horwich RMI (Q5) (LC)	
	Stockton (NL)	1–2	Leadgate Park (Q2) (NEL)	
	Ton Pentre (Q24) (SL)	0–3	Merthyr Town (SL)	
	Walsall (BL)	3–1	Worcester City (BL)	
	West Stanley (NEL)	2–0	Scotswood (NEL)	

== Fifth qualifying round ==
The 12 ties, comprising the 24 teams progressing from the previous round, were scheduled to be played on the 6 December. They were arranged on a wider regional basis than the previous round: three comprised divisional winning clubs competing against each other, three contained only clubs added to the draw at the previous round and the remaining six were between a mixture of those clubs.

Of the 12 clubs who progressed to the sixth qualifying round seven were from the qualifying divisions, four of which had beaten clubs added to the draw at the previous round. Among those eliminated were Cleethorpes Town who for the first occasion in six rounds had been drawn to a home tie.

Tie	Home team	Score	Away team	Note
	Bromley (AL)	2–2	Sheppey United (Q21) (KL)	
Replay	Sheppey United (Q21) (KL)	1–0	Bromley (AL)	aet
	Clapton (IL)	1–1	Gnome Athletic (Q17) (SEL)	
Replay	Gnome Athletic (Q17) (SEL)	1–0	Clapton (IL)	
	Cleethorpes Town (Q9) (GrL)	1–3	Castleford Town (Q10) (ML)	@Blundell Park
	Darlington (NEL)	9–2	Bishop Auckland (NL)	
	Dulwich Hamlet (IL)	1–3	Thornycrofts (Woolston) (Q22) (HL)	
	Hednesford (Q8) (BL)	4–2	Walsall (BL)	
	London Caledonians (IL)	6–0	King's Lynn (Q16) (EAL)	
	Loughborough Corinthians (Q14) (CA)	2–1	Rotherham Town (Q11) (ML)	
	Newport County (SL)	1–0	Merthyr Town (SL)	
	Rochdale (CL)	1–0	Stalybridge Celtic (LC)	
	South Liverpool (Q7) (LC)	3–1	Carlisle United (Q4) (NEL)	
	West Stanley (NEL)	2–0	Leadgate Park (Q2) (NEL)	

== Sixth qualifying round ==
In the sixth qualifying round the 12 winners from the previous round (including 7 from the qualifying divisions) were joined by 10 clubs from the Southern League (who were all amongst those elected to the Football League Third Division the following season) and 2 Football League Second Division clubs (Port Vale, who had recently taken the position of Leeds City following their demise, and Rotherham County). Ties were played on 20 December 1919 and the final match of the round was the third replay between Gillingham and Swansea Town played on 5 January 1920.

In the round's twelve ties: two were contested by early qualifying divisional winning clubs competing against each other (with Hednesford Town defeating Gnome Athletic and Thornycrofts (Woolston) defeating Sheppey United); two were between divisional winning clubs and those added at the fourth qualifying round (with Castleford Town winning and the other, South Liverpool, losing to Rochdale); the final qualifying division winner, Loughborough Corinthians, were defeated by Football League Second Division club Port Vale; and of the remaining seven ties four were contested solely by Southern League clubs who had entered the draw in this round and three were between clubs who entered in this and the fourth qualifying round – in two of which North Eastern League clubs triumphed: West Stanley defeated Football League Second Division club Rotherham County and Darlington beat Norwich City.

Of the early round divisional champions who progressed to the first round proper Thornycrofts (Woolston), who had started the competition in the extra preliminary round were defeated in an away replay at Football League First Division club Burnley and Hednesford Town (also competitors in the extra preliminary round) were beaten at the third of the divisional champions Castleford Town (who had first played in the competition in the preliminary round); the latter club were beaten in the second round proper at Football League First Division club Bradford Park Avenue.

Tie	Home team	Score	Away team	Note
	Brighton & Hove Albion (SL)	0–1	Luton Town (SL)	
	Castleford Town (Q10) (ML)	3–2	London Caledonians (IL)	
	Darlington (NEL)	5–0	Norwich City (SL)	
	Gillingham (SL)	1–1	Swansea Town (SL)	
Replay	Swansea Town (SL)	1–1	Gillingham (SL)	aet
Replay 2	Swansea Town (SL)	0–0	Gillingham (SL)	aet @Ninian Park
Replay 3	Gillingham (SL)	3–1	Swansea Town (SL)	@Stamford Bridge
	Hednesford Town (Q8) (BL)	2–2	Gnome Athletic (Q17) (SEL)	
Replay	Gnome Athletic (Q17) (SEL)	0–3	Hednesford Town (Q8) (BL)	
	Newport County (SL)	1–0	Exeter City (SL)	
	Northampton Town (SL)	2–2	Bristol Rovers (SL)	
Replay	Bristol Rovers (SL)	3–2	Northampton Town (SL)	
	Port Vale (FL2)	4–0	Loughborough Corinthians (Q14) (CA)	
	South Liverpool (Q7) (LC)	1–2	Rochdale (CL)	
	Southend United (SL)	1–0	Watford (SL)	
	Thornycrofts (Woolston) (Q22) (HL)	4–0	Sheppey United (Q21) (KL)	
	West Stanley (NEL)	1–0	Rotherham County (FL2)	

== 1919–20 FA Cup ==
See 1919–20 FA Cup for details of the rounds from the first round proper onwards.
