= 1880 in association football =

The following are the association football events of the year 1880 throughout the world.

== Events ==
=== Belgium ===
- Antwerp F.C.

=== England ===
- Clevedon Town F.C.
- Dorchester Town F.C.
- Hednesford Town F.C.
- Manchester City F.C.
- Preston North End F.C.

=== Northern Ireland ===
- Moyola Park F.C.

== Domestic cups ==
Nation	Tournament	Winner	Score	Runner-up	Venue	Title	Last title won
England	1879–80 FA Cup	Clapham Rovers	1-0	Oxford University	Kennington Oval	1st	None
Scotland	1879–80 Scottish Cup	Queen's Park	3-0	Thornliebank	Cathkin Park	4th	1876
Wales	1879–80 Welsh Cup	Druids	2-1	Ruthin Town	Racecourse Ground	1st	None

== Births ==
- 8 February – Joe Bache (d. 1960), England international forward in seven matches (1903–1911), scoring four goals.
- 29 March – Bobby Templeton (d. 1919), Scotland international forward in eleven matches (1902–1913).
- 25 May – Alf Common (d. 1946), England international forward in three matches (1904–1906), scoring two goals; the first player to be transferred for a fee of £1,000.
- 11 October – Jimmy McMenemy (d. 1965), Scotland international forward in twelve matches (1905–1920), scoring five goals.
- 18 October – Robert Hawkes (d. 1945), England international half-back in five matches (1907–1908).
- 28 October – Billy Wedlock (d. 1965), England international half-back in 26 matches (1907–1914), scoring two goals.
- 10 December – Andrew Wilson (d. 1945), Scotland international forward in six matches (1907–1914).
- Full date unknown
  - James Horner, English professional footballer
