= Frederick Chatburn =

English footballer

Personal information
- Full name: Frederick William Chatburn
- Date of birth: 5 March 1878
- Place of birth: Grimsby, England
- Date of death: 20 May 1937 (age 59)
- Place of death: Los Angeles, California, USA
- Position: Winger

Senior career*
| Years | Team | Apps | (Gls) |
| 1895–1896 | Weelsby Alexandra | | |
| 1896–1897 | Grimsby White Star | | |
| 1897–1898 | Grimsby All Saints | | |
| 1898–1900 | Grimsby Town | 1 | (1) |
| 1900 | Grimsby All Saints | | |
| 1900–190? | Grimsby Rovers | | |
- * Club domestic league appearances and goals

Frederick William Chatburn (5 March 1878 – 20 May 1937) was an English professional footballer who played as a winger.

Chatburn moved to the United States in 1921 and became a U.S. citizen in 1927. He worked as a stone carver. He settled in Inglewood, Los Angeles, where he died in 1937.
