= BCFC =

BCFC may refer to one of the following association football clubs:

- Ballyclare Comrades F.C., Northern Ireland
- Bath City F.C., Somerset, England
- Belfast Celtic F.C., Northern Ireland
- Belfast Celtic F.C. (1978), Northern Ireland
- Bentley Colliery F.C., near Doncaster, England
- Birmingham City F.C., West Midlands, England
- Bishop's Cleeve F.C., Gloucestershire, England
- Bloemfontein Celtic F.C., South Africa
- Brechin City F.C., Scotland
- Bristol City F.C., Bristol, England
- Bangor City F.C., Wales

== See also ==
- Bradford City A.F.C.
