= Wilf Vickers =

English footballer

Personal information
- Full name: Wilfred Vickers
- Date of birth: 3 August 1924
- Place of birth: Wakefield, England
- Date of death: September 1984 (aged 60)
- Place of death: Goole, England
- Position: Forward

Senior career*
Years	Team	Apps	(Gls)
1947–1948	Brighton & Hove Albion	5	(1)
1948–1949	West Bromwich Albion	0	(0)
1949–1952	Aldershot	15	(1)
1952–1953	Bentley Colliery		
1953–19??	Gainsborough Trinity		
- * Club domestic league appearances and goals

Wilfred Vickers (3 August 1924 – September 1984) was an English professional footballer who played as a forward in the Football League for Brighton & Hove Albion and Aldershot. He was on the books of West Bromwich Albion without appearing at first-team level, and went on to play non-league football for clubs including Bentley Colliery and Gainsborough Trinity.
