= Shreeve (surname) =

Shreeve is a surname. Notable people with the surname include:

- Allison Shreeve (born 1982), Australian windsurfer
- David Shreeve, British charity worker
- David Shreeve (priest) (1934-2021), British Anglican clergyman
- Fred Shreeve (1882–1962), English footballer
- Jack Shreeve (1917-1966), English footballer
- Jean'ne Shreeve (born 1933), American chemist
- Mark Shreeve, English musician

== See also ==
- Shreeves
