= Rotherham F.C. =

Rotherham F.C. could mean one of four football clubs:

- Rotherham F.C., founded in December 1870, which originally played to Sheffield rules on the Doncaster Road and which dissolved in around 1878
- Rotherham Town F.C. (1878), dissolved 1896; a former member of the Football League
- Rotherham Town F.C. (1899), dissolved 1925
- Rotherham United F.C., founded 1925
