= James Horner (disambiguation) =

James Horner (1953–2015) was an American composer, conductor and orchestrator of film scores.

James Horner may also refer to:

- James Horner Haslett (1832–1905), Irish Conservative Party politician
- James Horner (footballer) (1880–?), English professional footballer
