= Les Gordon (footballer) =

English footballer

Personal information
- Full name: Leslie William Gordon
- Date of birth: 13 July 1903
- Place of birth: Barking Town, England
- Height: 5 ft 9 in (1.75 m)
- Position: Left half

Senior career*
| Years | Team | Apps | (Gls) |
| 19??–1923 | Grimsby Rovers | | |
| 1923–1925 | Sheffield United | 0 | (0) |
| 1925–192? | Crystal Palace | 0 | (0) |
| 192?–1927 | Shirebrook | | |
| 1927–1928 | Nottingham Forest | 2 | (0) |
| 1928–1930 | Brighton & Hove Albion | 18 | (0) |
| 1936–19?? | Cleethorpes UDC Buses | | |
- * Club domestic league appearances and goals

Leslie William Gordon (13 July 1903 – after 1936) was an English professional footballer who played as a left half in the Football League for Nottingham Forest and Brighton & Hove Albion.

== Life and career ==
Gordon was born in 1903 in Barking Town, Essex, the son of William Gordon, an engineer, and his wife Adeline. By the time of the 1911 census, the family were living in Cleethorpes, Lincolnshire.

Gordon played football for Grimsby Rovers before joining First Division club Sheffield United in 1923. He never broke through to the first team, and after two years moved on to Crystal Palace of the Third Division South, where he had a similar lack of success. After a spell with Midland League club Shirebrook, he signed for another First Division club, Nottingham Forest. The Derby Daily Telegraph thought he had "height and weight on his side but lack[ed] something in steadiness in front of the sticks." This time he managed to make his Football League debut, coming into an injury-hit Forest team for the visit to Hull City on 31 October, but he appeared just once more that season.

He then signed for Brighton & Hove Albion of the Third Division South, where he came into the first team in January 1929 and played 18 times before returning to the reserves. In December, he broke his leg in a Southern League match, an injury that finished his senior career at the age of 26. Gordon returned to Cleethorpes where he worked for the municipal bus company; in 1936, he applied for a permit to resume amateur status so that he could play for their works team.
