= Charles Rowston =

English footballer

Personal information
- Full name: Charles Ernest Rowston
- Date of birth: 1887
- Place of birth: Grimsby, England
- Date of death: 28 September 1946 (aged 58–59)
- Position: Winger

Senior career*
Years	Team	Apps	(Gls)
1908–1909	Cleethorpes Town		
1909–1910	Grimsby Town	15	(1)
1910–1911	Cleethorpes Town		
1911–1912	Grimsby Rovers		
1912–1913	Gainsborough Trinity		
1913–1914	Cleethorpes Town		
1914–1919	Grimsby Rovers		
1919–19??	Cleethorpes Town		
- * Club domestic league appearances and goals

Charles Ernest Rowston (1887 – 28 September 1946) was an English professional footballer who played as a winger.
