= Tommy Talks =

English footballer (1897–1987)

Personal information
- Full name: Thomas Talks
- Date of birth: 15 May 1897
- Place of birth: Lincoln, England
- Date of death: 1987 (aged 89–90)
- Height: 5 ft 7 in (1.70 m)
- Position: Forward

Senior career*
| Years | Team | Apps | (Gls) |
| 1919 | Lincoln City | 0 | (0) |
| 1919–1920 | Grimsby Rovers | | |
| 1920–1922 | Grimsby Town | 15 | (4) |
| 1922–192? | Boston Town | | |
- * Club domestic league appearances and goals

Thomas Talks (15 May 1897 – 1987) was an English professional footballer who played as a forward.
