= Leaning (surname) =

Leaning is a surname. Notable people with the surname include:

- Andy Leaning (born 1963), English former professional footballer
- David Leaning (1936–2015), an eminent Anglican priest
- Jack Leaning (born 1993), English first-class cricketer
- Jennifer Leaning, American health scholar
- Joseph Leaning (1874–1949), English professional footballer
