= Fulljames =

Fulljames is a surname.

== People ==
- John Fulljames (b. 1976), English opera director
- William Fulljames (1939–2020), English Sculpture artist
- Reginald Fulljames (1896–1985), English cricketer and officer in Royal Flying Corps (RFC) and Royal Air Force (RAF)
- Thomas Fulljames (1808–1874), English architect
- William Fulljames (1888–1959), English association football player
