= Harry Chantry =

English footballer

Personal information
- Date of birth: 21 November 1885
- Place of birth: Caistor, England
- Date of death: 26 March 1971 (aged 85)
- Position: Winger

Senior career*
Years	Team	Apps	(Gls)
1902–1903	White Cross United		
1903–1904	Albert Swifts		
1904–1905	Hagerup & Doughty		
1905–1906	Grimsby Rovers		
1906–1907	Grimsby Town	4	(0)
1907–1908	Grimsby Rovers		
1908	Grimsby Rangers		
1908	Scunthorpe & Lindsey United		
1908–1909	Rotherham Town		
1909–1910	Grimsby Victoria		
1910–191?	Immingham		
- * Club domestic league appearances and goals

Harry Chantry (21 November 1885 – 26 March 1971) was an English professional footballer who played as a winger.
