= William Fulljames =

English footballer

Personal information
- Date of birth: 28 December 1888
- Place of birth: Cleethorpes, England
- Date of death: 27 August 1959 (aged 70)
- Position: Centre-half

Senior career*
Years	Team	Apps	(Gls)
1908–1909	Grimsby Rovers		
1909–1910	St James United		
1910–1911	Grimsby Rovers		
1911–1912	Grimsby Town	1	(0)
1912	Cleethorpes Victoria		
1912–1913	Goole Town		
1913–1914	Scunthorpe & Lindsey United		
1914–1919	Coventry City		
1919–1920	Nuneaton Town		
1920–192?	Caerphilly		
- * Club domestic league appearances and goals

William Fulljames (28 December 1888 – 27 August 1959) was an English professional footballer who played as a centre-half.
