= Silverwood Colliery F.C. =

Silverwood Colliery
- Full name: Silverwood Colliery Football Club

Silverwood Colliery F.C. was an English association football club based in Rotherham, South Yorkshire.

== History ==
They competed in the Midland Football League in 1919–20, and in the FA Cup on numerous occasions.

=== League and cup history ===
Silverwood Colliery League and Cup history
Season	Division	Position	FA Cup
1909–10			Extra preliminary round
1910–11			1st qualifying round
1911–12			Preliminary round
1912–13			1st qualifying round
1913–14			3rd qualifying round
1914–15			Preliminary round
1919–20	Midland League	17th/18	1st qualifying round
1921–22			1st qualifying round
1929–30			1st qualifying round
1930–31			1st qualifying round
1931–32			Preliminary round
1932–33	Sheffield Association League	1st	Preliminary round
1933–34			3rd qualifying round
1934–35			2nd qualifying round
1935–36			Preliminary round

== Records ==
- Furthest FA Cup run – 3rd qualifying round, 1913–14, 1933–34
