= Shreeves =

Shreeves is a surname. Notable people with the surname include:

- Geoff Shreeves (born 1964), British sports reporter
- Peter Shreeves (born 1940), Welsh footballer and manager

== See also ==
- Shreeve (surname)
