= Joseph Leaning =

English footballer

Personal information
- Full name: Joseph Leaning
- Date of birth: 1874
- Place of birth: Grimsby, England
- Date of death: 1949 (aged 74–75)
- Position: Goalkeeper

Senior career*
Years	Team	Apps	(Gls)
1893–1894	St Andrew's		
1894–1895	Grimsby United		
1895–1896	West Marsh Wanderers		
1896–1897	Grimsby All Saints		
1897–1898	Grimsby Town	2	(0)
1898–1900	Grimsby Rovers		
1900–1901	Grimsby Town	3	(0)
1901–1902	Grimsby Rovers		
1902–1903	West Marsh Social		
1903–190?	Grimsby Rovers		
- * Club domestic league appearances and goals

Joseph Leaning (1874 – 1949) was an English professional footballer who played as a goalkeeper.
