= John Scott (footballer, born 1890) =

English footballer

Personal information
- Full name: John George Scott
- Date of birth: 1890
- Place of birth: Wallsend, England
- Height: 5 ft 11 1/2 in (1.82 m)
- Position: Outside left

Senior career*
Years	Team	Apps	(Gls)
1909–1910	Wallsend Slipway		
1910–1913	Newcastle United	8	(1)
1913–1915	Grimsby Town	47	(1)
1919–1920	Cleethorpes Town		
1920–192?	Charlton's		
- * Club domestic league appearances and goals

John George Scott was an English professional footballer who played as an outside left in the Football League for Grimsby Town and Newcastle United.

== Personal life ==
Scott served in the British Army during the First World War.

== Career statistics ==
Appearances and goals by club, season and competition
Club	Season	League			FA Cup		Total	
Club	Season	Division	Apps	Goals	Apps	Goals	Apps	Goals
Newcastle United	1910–11	First Division	1	0	0	0	1	0
Newcastle United	1911–12	First Division	6	1	0	0	6	1
Newcastle United	1912–13	First Division	1	0	0	0	1	0
Newcastle United	Total		8	1	0	0	8	1
Grimsby Town	1914–15	Second Division	17	1	1	0	18	1
Career total			25	2	1	0	26	2
