= Cleethorpes Town F.C. (1901) =

English association football club

Cleethorpes Town
- Full name: Cleethorpes Town Football Club
- Nickname(s): the Meggies
- Founded: 1901
- Dissolved: 1946
- Ground: Taylor's Avenue
Home colours

Cleethorpes Town F.C. was an English association football club from the town of Cleethorpes in Lincolnshire.

== History ==
The first record for the club is from the 1901–02 season under the name St Peter's. It changed its name to Cleethorpes Town in 1904. Its first local success came in 1907–08, when it reached three local finals (Grimsby Charity Cup, Horncastle Cup, and Lincolnshire Junior Cup); it lost the Lincolnshire final to Scunthorpe United, but beat Lincoln South End in the final the following season. The club also reached the Hull Times final in 1910–11 and 1911–12, trading wins with the works side of Reckitts, and in the latter season taking the Grimsby League. The club also played in the first iteration of the Lincolnshire Football League, finishing as runner-up in the northern section in 1913–14.

The club's ambit was almost purely local, and it did not reach the main rounds of the FA Cup; the furthest it reached was the fifth and penultimate qualifying round in 1919–20, losing to Castleford Town - the Meggies being handicapped after forward Chris Young had to leave the field in the first half through injury. It never rose above the status of local leagues, even withdrawing from the Grimsby League in 1905 after a match with Grimsby All Saints that ended in extreme acrimony, including one Cleethorpes player removing the goalposts so the game could not finish.

Although the club was playing matches up to the outbreak of World War 2, it had started operating in 1930 as a de facto nursery club for Grimsby Town, which led to a Football Association inquiry as to whether the club was truly amateur, and could retain its place in the FA Amateur Cup. The club did not operate during the war itself, and did not re-start on the declaration of peace, having been unable to find an exclusive ground. There was a brief resurrection in the 1960s of the club before another club chose the name in 2005.

== Colours ==
The club wore black and white striped shirts, white shorts, and black socks.

== Ground ==
The club originally played at Kingsway; in 1919, it moved to a ground behind Reynolds Street School on the Grimsby Road, and in 1925 moved to Taylor's Avenue, christened with a friendly against Grimsby Town. The ground hosted motorcycle football in 1926.

== Nickname ==
The club's nickname was the Meggies, a local term for those born and bred in Cleethorpes.

== Notable players ==
- Arthur Bateman. defender who moved to Grimsby Town in 1927 and was later a regular for Brentford.
- Thomas Bell, former Grimsby Town player who finished his career with the club just before World War 1.
- Alec Hall, wing-half who played for the club in 1928–29 before becoming a stalwart at Grimsby.
- John Scott, former Newcastle United forward who joined Cleethorpes after World War 1
- Charlie Wilson, defender who also played one season for the Meggies (1921–22) before becoming a regular at Grimsby
- Charlie Wrack, defender who was also signed by Grimsby Town
