= Kimberworth Old Boys F.C. =

English defunct football club

Kimberworth Old Boys
- Full name: Kimberworth Old Boys Football Club

Kimberworth Old Boys F.C. was an English association football club from Sheffield, South Yorkshire. The club reached the third qualifying round of the FA Cup in 1919/20, a year after winning the Sheffield & Hallamshire Junior Cup.
