= Hook Shipyards F.C. =

Hook Shipyards
- Full name: Hook Shipyards Football Club

Hook Shipyards F.C. was an English football club.

== History ==
The club joined the Yorkshire League in 1921. They finished 15th out of 17 clubs and resigned from the competition after a single season.
