= Fred Shreeve =

English footballer

Personal information
- Full name: Frederick Daniel Shreeve
- Date of birth: 17 December 1882
- Place of birth: Newhall, Derbyshire, England
- Date of death: 1962 (aged 79–80)
- Position: Full back

Senior career*
| Years | Team | Apps | (Gls) |
| 1904–1905 | Gresley Rovers | 23 | (3) |
| 1905–1906 | Burton United | 34 | (0) |
| 1906–1908 | Millwall | 44 | (0) |
| 1908–1911 | West Ham United | 65 | (4) |
| 1911–1913 | Doncaster Rovers | | (3) |
| 1913–1914 | Bentley Colliery | | |
| 1919–1920 | Methley Perseverance | | |
- * Club domestic league appearances and goals

Frederick Daniel Shreeve (17 December 1882 - 1962) was an English footballer who played for Gresley Rovers, Burton United, Millwall, West Ham United, Doncaster Rovers and Bentley Colliery.

== Career ==
Nicknamed "Sparrow", Shreeve started his footballing career with Stanton FC, Newhall Swifts FC and then Gresley Rovers but after only one season moved on to play for Burton United. Two seasons with Millwall followed before he signed for West Ham United in 1908. He made his debut on 24 October 1908 against Northampton Town; a 2–1 West Ham win in which Shreeve scored. He missed only one game in his first season for The Hammers. Two further seasons followed before he moved on to play for Doncaster Rovers. After leaving Doncaster Rovers he had spells with Bentley Colliery and Methley Perseverance from 1919 until 1920 when he finished his footballing career.

He was the father of Jack Shreeve who played for Charlton Athletic in the 1946 and 1947 FA Cup Finals.
