= James Horner (footballer) =

English footballer

Personal information
- Date of birth: 1880
- Place of birth: Kirkby, England
- Position: Goalkeeper

Senior career*
Years	Team	Apps	(Gls)
1903–1904	Grimsby Town	1	(0)
1904	Grimsby Rovers		
1904–1905	Grimsby Rangers		
1905–1907	Grimsby Town	13	(0)
1907	Grimsby Thursday		
1907–1908	Rotherham County		
1908–1909	Grimsby Rovers		
1909–1910	Rotherham County		
1910–191?	Grimsby Rovers		
- * Club domestic league appearances and goals

James Horner (born 1880) was an English professional footballer who played as a goalkeeper.
