= Bostall Heath F.C. =

Bostall Heath
- Full name: Bostall Heath Football Club
- Ground: Wickham Street, Welling
Home colours

Bostall Heath Football Club was a football club based in Welling, England.

== History ==
From 1921 to 1939, Bostall Heath competed in the Premier Division of the London League. Bostall Heath entered the FA Cup for the first time in the 1931–32 season.

== Ground ==
Bostall Heath played at Wickham Street in Welling.

== Records ==
- Best FA Cup performance: Third qualifying round, 1931–32
- Best FA Amateur Cup performance: Third round, 1924–25
