= Rotherham Town F.C. (1899) =

Rotherham Town
- Full name: Rotherham Town Football Club
- Nickname: the Town
- Founded: 1899
- Dissolved: 1925
- Ground: Clifton Lane
Home colours

Rotherham Town F.C. was an English football club from Rotherham, Yorkshire. They merged with rivals Rotherham County in 1925 to form Rotherham United.

== History ==
In 1899, Rotherham Casuals and Rotherham Grammar School combined to form Rotherham F.C. On becoming a limited company in 1904 a new name of Rotherham Athletic was adopted, and a year later they changed their name again, to Rotherham Town (no relation to the previous Rotherham Town that was a member of the Football League in the 1890s).

In 1903 the new club joined the Midland League, where they remained until 1925. At the end of the 1921–22 season, a merger had been agreed with their Third Division North neighbours Rotherham County, owing to a parlous financial state. The club even went so far to resign from the Midland League, but in late May 1922 the club resolved to carry on, and had to withdraw its resignation. The merger finally took place in March 1925, the clubs forming Rotherham United.

== Colours ==
As Rotherham, the club wore claret and blue halved shirts. In 1903 they changed to blue and white, which (apart from spending 1905–06 in white jerseys) remained the colours of the club to dissolution, originally as blue with white sleeves, but from 1919 in stripes.

== Ground ==
The club played at Clifton Lane, the ground of the predecessor Rotherham Town.

== Notable former players ==
- Category:Rotherham Town F.C. (1899) players

== League and cup history ==
Rotherham Town League and Cup history				
Season	Division	Position	FA Cup	Rotherham Charity Cup
1899–1900	Sheffield Association League Division 2	1st/9	-	
1900–01	Sheffield Association League	6th/15	Preliminary round	Runners Up
1901–02	Sheffield Association League	5th/13	Preliminary round	Winners
1902–03	Sheffield Association League	1st/9	4th qualifying round	Winners
1903–04	Midland League	3rd/11	-	Winners
1904–05	Midland League	6th/17	Extra preliminary round	Winners
1905–06	Midland League	4th/18	3rd qualifying round	Semi Final
1906–07	Midland League	4th/20	3rd qualifying round	
1907–08	Midland League	3rd/20	1st round	
1908–09	Midland League	2nd/20	5th qualifying round	
1909–10	Midland League	17th/22	5th qualifying round	
1910–11	Midland League	16th/20	5th qualifying round	
1911–12	Midland League	2nd/19	3rd qualifying round	
1912–13	Midland League	11th/20	3rd qualifying round	
1913–14	Midland League	8th/18	Preliminary round	
1914–15	Midland League	9th/20	4th qualifying round	
1919–20	Midland League	7th/18	5th qualifying round	
1920–21	Midland League	5th/20	1st qualifying round	
1921–22	Midland League	11th/22	Extra preliminary round	
1922–23	Midland League	21st/22	4th qualifying round	
1923–24	Midland League	22nd/22	4th qualifying round	
1924–25	Midland League	12th/15	2nd qualifying round	

== Honours ==
=== League ===
- Midland League
  - Runners-up: 1908–09, 1911–12
- Sheffield Association League
  - Champions: 1902–03
- Sheffield Association League Division 2
  - Champions: 1899–1900

=== Cup ===
- Sheffield & Hallamshire Senior Cup
  - Winners: 1919–20, 1924–25
- Rotherham Charity Cup
  - Winners: 1899–1900

== Records ==
- Best FA Cup performance: 1st round, 1907–08
