= Tankersley F.C. =

Tankersley
- Full name: Tankersley Football Club

Tankersley F.C. was an English association football club based in Tankersley, Barnsley, South Yorkshire.

== History ==
The Historic club was formed around 1910, and competed in the Barnsley Association League right through to its winding up in 1923. They also entered the FA Cup on numerous occasions.

== Honours ==
- Barnsley Association League
  - Champions - 1913/14

== Records ==
- Best FA Cup performance: 1st Qualifying Round, 1912–13, 1919–20
