= Cromer Town F.C. =

Association football club in England

Coordinates: 52°55′25.93″N 1°18′26.11″E

Cromer Town
- Full name: Cromer Town Football Club
- Nickname: The Crabs
- Founded: 1997
- Ground: Cabbell Park, Cromer
- League: North East Norfolk League Division One
- 2022–23: North East Norfolk League Division One (withdrew)
Home colours

Cromer Town Football Club is a football club based in Cromer, Norfolk. Established in 1997 by a merger of Cromer Town and Madra United, they are currently members of the North East Norfolk League Division One and play at Cabbell Park.

== History ==
=== Cromer Town ===
Cromer F.C. were first recorded during the 1898–99 season, when they were runners-up in the Norfolk Junior Cup. They won the competition in 1903 and entered the Norfolk & Suffolk League in the same year. They were runners-up in 1906–07, and in 1908–09 they won the league on goal average. They were runners-up again in 1910–11 and 1912–13, a season that also saw them win the Norfolk Senior Cup. They retained the Senior Cup the following season and won it again in 1920–21.

After finishing as Norfolk & Suffolk League runners-up in 1936–37, the club joined the Eastern Counties League. However, after World War II they returned to the Norfolk & Suffolk League, and were runners-up in 1948–49. In 1964 they were renamed Cromer Town and joined the Anglian Combination, which had been formed by a merger of the N&SL and the East Anglian League. After a transitional season, Cromer were placed in Division One. They were relegated to Division Two in 1970 and Division Three in 1978.

=== Madra United ===
Overstrand F.C. originally played in the Norfolk & Suffolk League before joining the Anglian Combination on its formation. They won Division Three in 1969–70. They were promoted to Division One in 1971 and to the Premier Division in 1985. They won the title in 1991–92. In 1994 the club moved from Overstrand to Knapton and were renamed Madra United (Madra being an acronym for Mundesley and District Recreation Association, who owned the club's playing facilities).

=== Merged club ===
In 1997 the two clubs merged, creating Cromer United, which took Madra's place in the Premier Division of the Anglian Combination but played at Town's Cabbell Park. They were renamed Cromer Town in 2003 and won the Combination in 2003–04, 2005–06, 2010–11 and 2011–12, The Mummery Cup in 2002–03 and 2005–06 completing the league and cup double and also the Don Frost Cup in 2003, 2004, 2011 and 2012.

== Ground ==
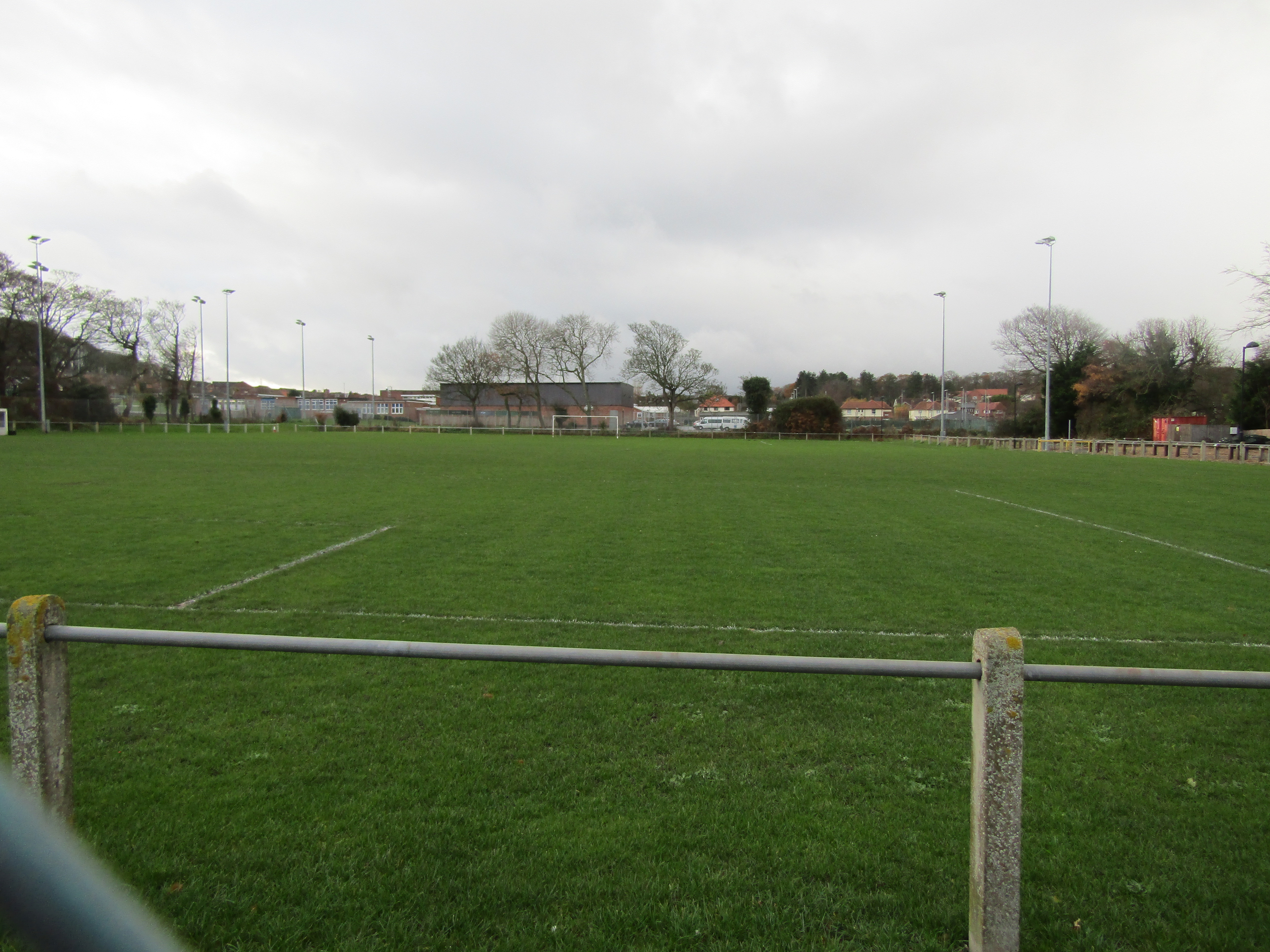
Cabbell Park pitch.

Cromer Town moved to Cabbell Park in 1922 after leaving Beef Meadow on Hall Road. The ground was named after Mrs Benjamin Bond-Cabbell, who donated the land to the town in remembrance of Cromer residents who died in World War I, and was opened on 6 September 1922. However, in 2009 the club learned that the bequest was a lease rather than a gift, and was set to expire 21 years after the death of Queen Victoria's last great-grandchild. That was King Olav V of Norway, who died in 1991, meaning that the lease expired in 2012.

== Honours ==
=== Cromer Town ===
- Anglian Combination
  - Premier Division
    - Champions 2003–04, 2005–06, 2010–11, 2011–12
  - Mummery Cup
    - Winners 2002–03, 2005–06
  - Don Frost Cup
    - Winners 2003, 2004, 2011, 2012
- Norfolk Senior Cup
  - Winners 1912–13, 1913–14, 1920–21
- Norfolk & Suffolk League
  - Champions 1908–09
- Norfolk Junior Cup
  - Winners 1902–03
- Sailor Brown Trophy
  - Winners 2011, 2012

=== Overstrand F.C ===
- Anglian Combination
  - Premier Division champions 1991–92
  - Division Three champions 1969–70
