= Caerau Rovers A.F.C. =

Former football club based in Caerau

Caerau Rovers
- Full name: Caerau Rovers Association Football Club
- Dissolved: 1920s

Caerau Rovers A.F.C. was a Welsh football club based in Caerau, Bridgend County Borough.

The club competed in the FA Cup qualifying rounds from 1914–15 to 1921–22, but never made it further than the preliminary round. The club also entered the Welsh Cup in those seasons, as well as in the 1922–23 season.

They played in local leagues, such as the Tondu & District League and the Bridgend & District League, before progressing to the Welsh Football League.
