= Gnome Athletic F.C. =

Former English football club

Gnome Athletic
- Full name: Gnome Athletic Football Club
- Founded: 1917
- Dissolved: 1928
- Ground: Billet Lane
Home colours

Gnome Athletic F.C. was an English football club based in Walthamstow, East London.

== History ==
Originally the works team of Peter Hooker Limited, which manufactured engines in conjunction with the French Gnôme and Le Rhône Engine Company, the club was formed during the First World War, although it could not play competitive football until 1919, when it joined the South Essex League and the Middlesex Senior League, winning the latter by remaining unbeaten until April. The season also saw the club reach the final qualifying round of the FA Cup (the equivalent of the second round today), but lost 3–0 at home to Hednesford Town in a replay, watched by 4,000.

For 1920–21, the club joined the London League. In 1923, manager Harry Curtis left to take charge of Brentford, and the club changed its name to Walthamstow Town; without company backing, it also had to move ground. Before the 1927–27 season, the club changed its name to Walthamstow Borough, as a result of the district applying for a charter of incorporation, which was not in fact granted; but the news came too late for the club to withdraw its name change request. However, that season, it finished bottom of the London League with just three wins, and disbanded part-way through the following season; at the time, the club was bottom but one of the second tier of the London League, with 8 points from 10 games.

== Colours ==
The club wore white jerseys with dark shorts and socks.

== Ground ==
The club originally played at the company sports ground at Uplands. In 1923 it moved to Billet Lane.
