= Bentley Colliery F.C. =

Bentley Colliery
- Full name: Bentley Colliery Football Club
- Founded: 1912 (reformed 1975)
- Dissolved: 1961 & 2016
- Ground: Miners Welfare Ground
- 2014–15: Central Midlands League North Division, Withdrew
Home colours

Bentley Colliery F.C. was an English football club based in Bentley, Doncaster, South Yorkshire. Until December 2015 they played in the Central Midlands League North Division, at level 11 of the English football league system.

== History ==
The club, which was first founded in 1912 in association with Bentley Colliery, spent the first few decades of its existence in relative obscurity, except for a three-year spell in the Yorkshire League during the early 1920s.

They rejoined the Yorkshire League after the Second World War, winning promotion to the top flight of the competition in 1952. They were relegated back to the Second Division in 1956, but won promotion back again at the first attempt. They left the league altogether after a disastrous campaign in 1961 and eventually folded. They regularly entered the FA Cup during the 1950s, reaching the 3rd Qualifying Round in 1955 and 1956.

The club was reformed in 1976 as a Sunday league side, with Bentley Victoria Welfare being the prominent senior team in the village during the 1970s and 1980s. Colliery re-entered senior football and competed in the Doncaster & District Senior League during the 1990s, eventually winning the title in 2001 and earning promotion to the Central Midlands League in the process.

They won promotion from the Premier Division to the Supreme Division in 2007 but were forcibly relegated the following season due to their lack of floodlights, despite finishing in mid-table. They were placed in the North Division when the CMFL restructured in 2011, regaining their Step 7 status.

In December 2015, Bentley tendered their resignation from the Central Midlands League.

=== Notable former players ===
Players that have played in the Football League either before or after playing for Bentley Colliery –

- Harry Bromage
- Fred Shreeve

== Ground ==
The club used to play at the Miners Welfare Ground, on The Avenue, Bentley, postcode DN5 0PN.

=== Gallery ===
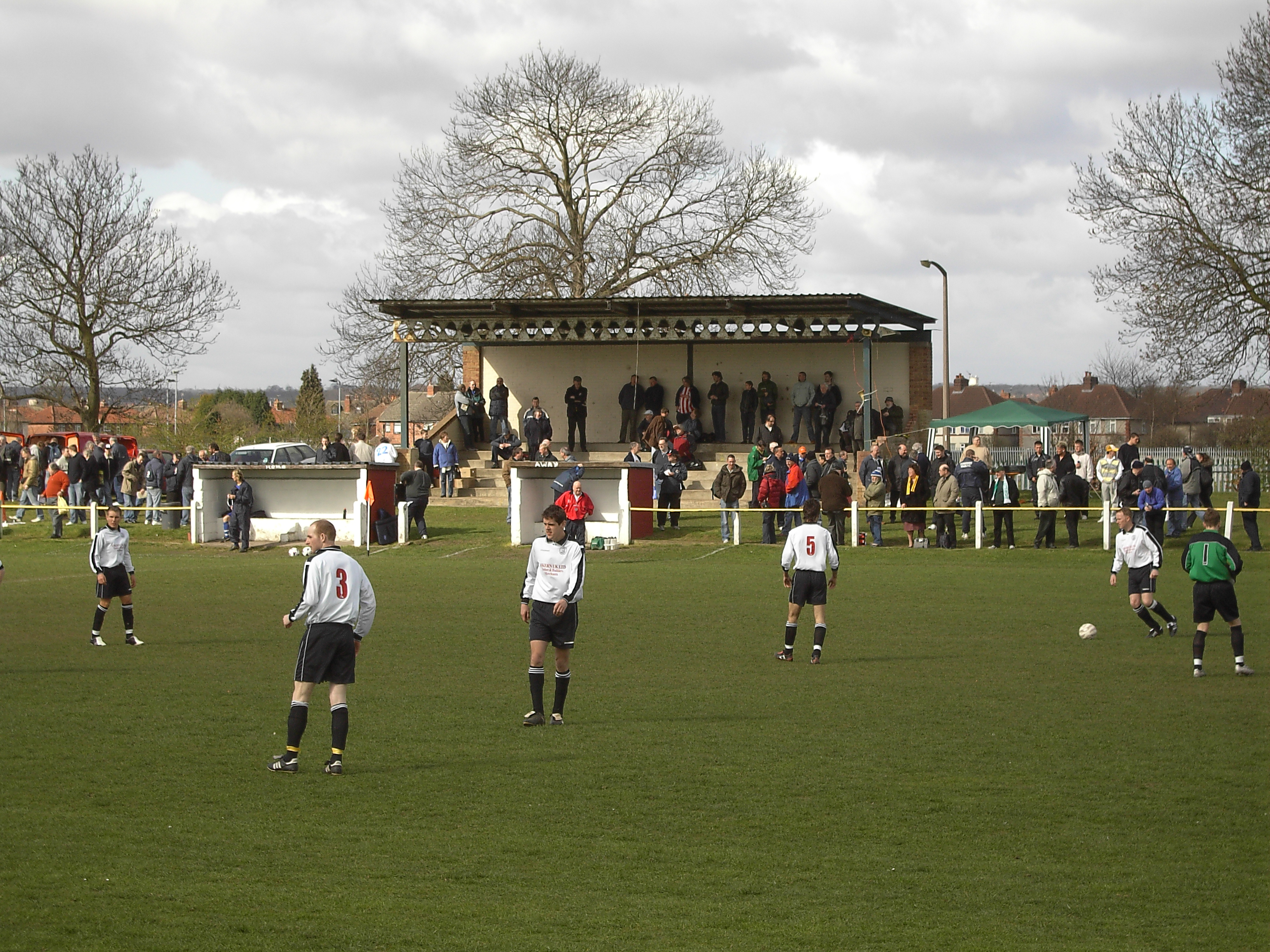
Avenue Road main stand with the traditional Yorkshire welfare design roof as seen at various former welfare grounds.

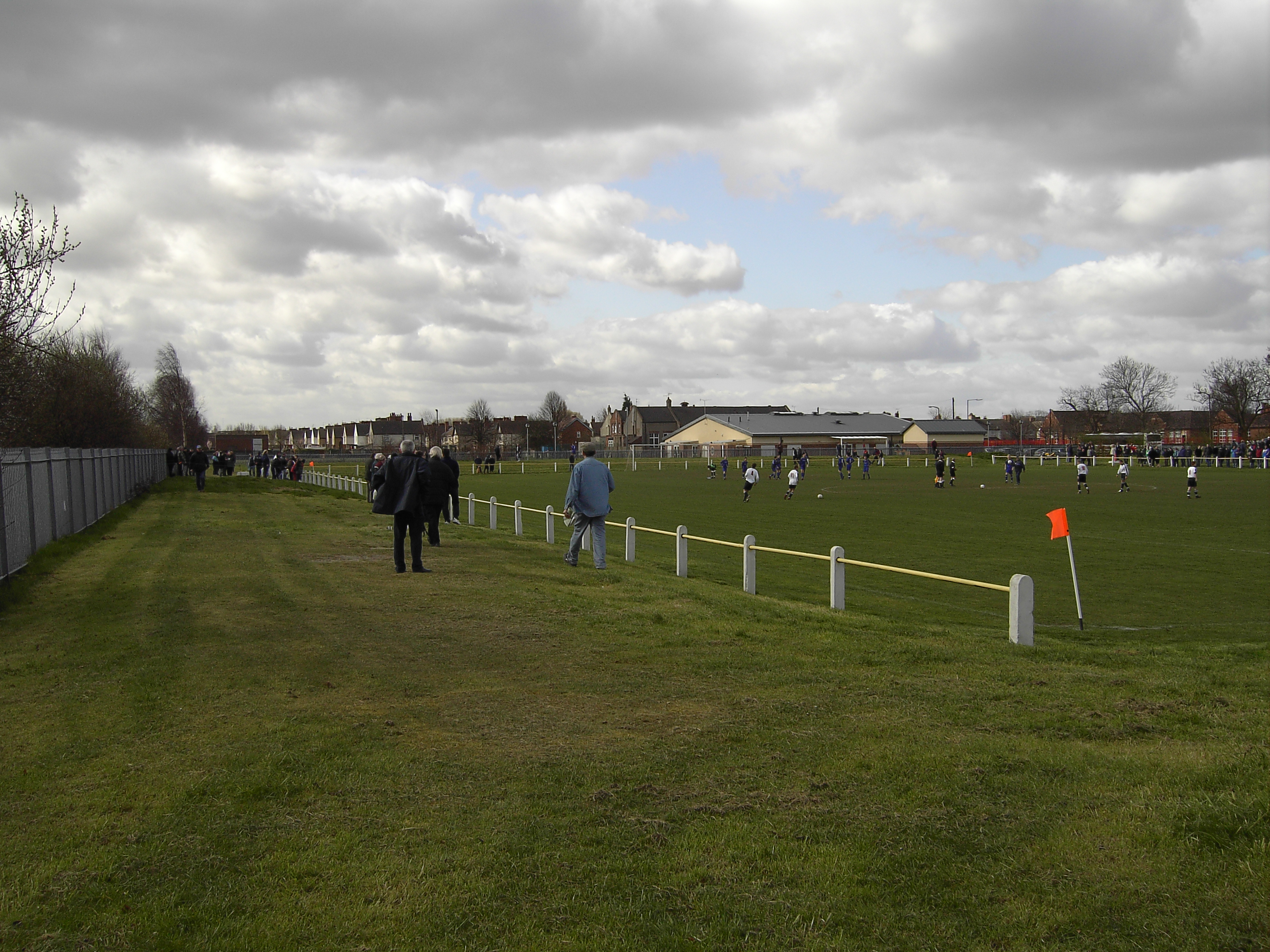
Railway side banking currently overgrown and disused as it does not have the required hard standing.

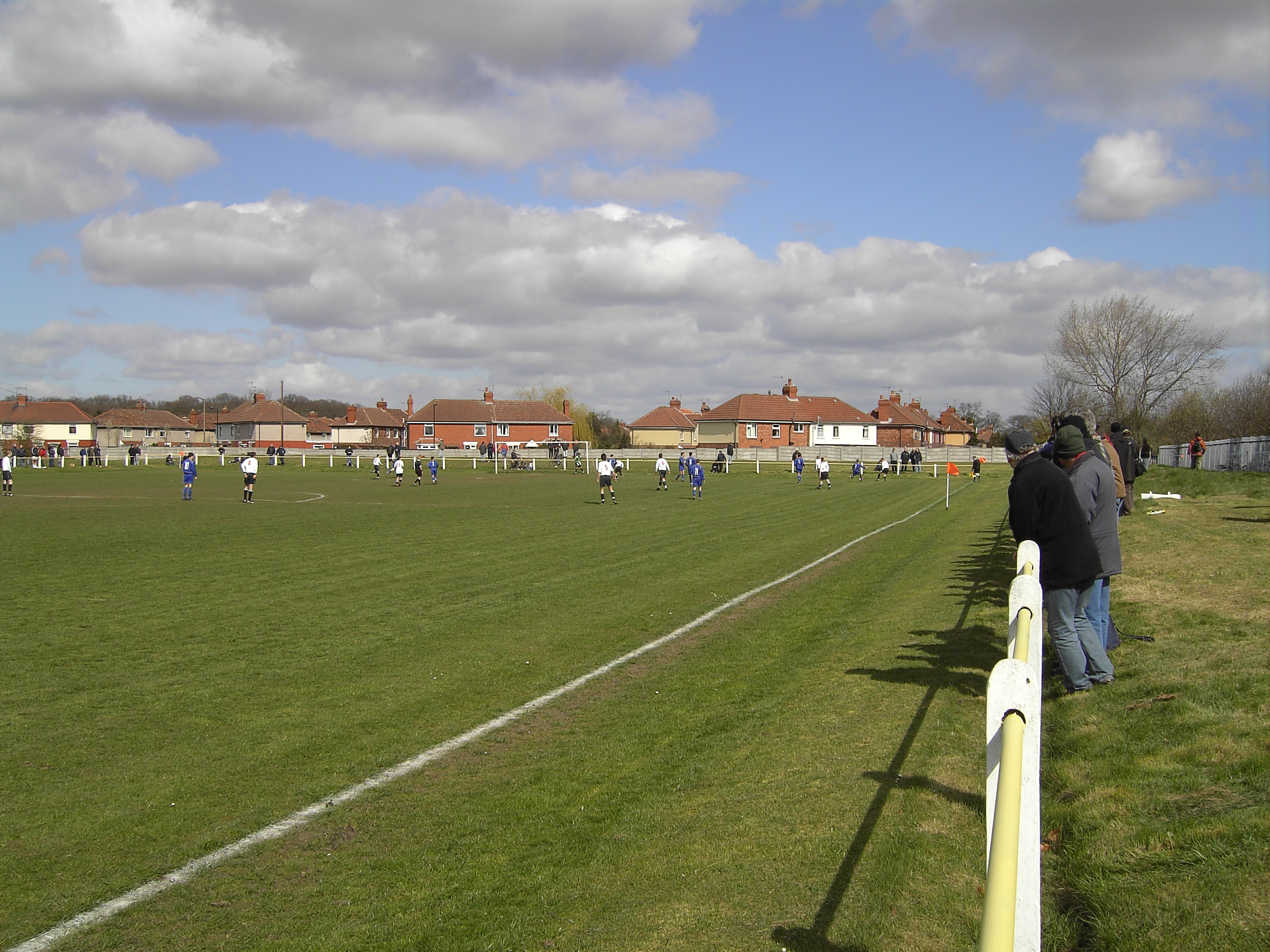
Elm Crescent end banking currently overgrown and disused as it does not have the required hard standing.

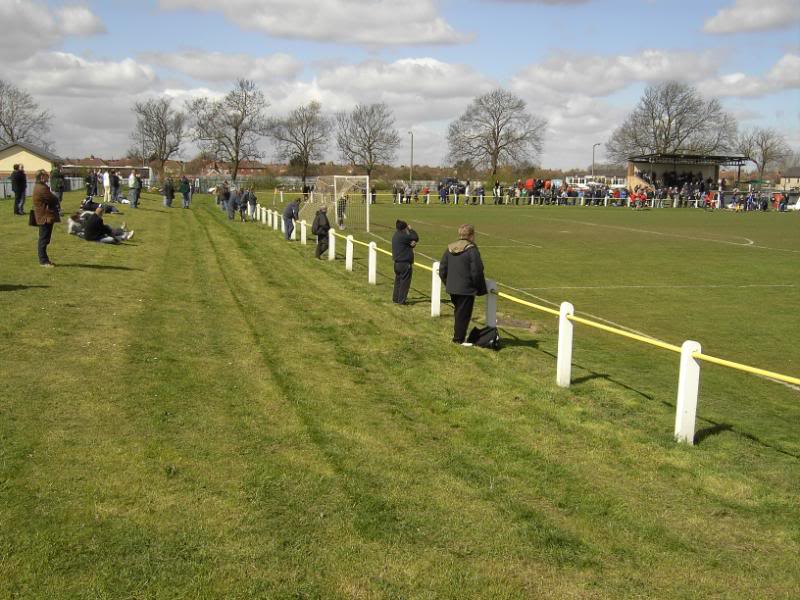
School end banking leading to pay gate and exit.

== Honours ==
=== League ===
- Yorkshire League Division Two
  - Promoted: 1951–52, 1956–57
- Central Midlands League Premier Division
  - Promoted: 2006–07
- Sheffield Association League
  - Champions: 1919–20
- Doncaster & District Senior League
  - Champions: 2000–01

=== Cup ===
- Sheffield & Hallamshire Senior Cup
  - Winners: 1957–58, 1958–59

== Records ==
- Best FA Cup performance: 3rd Qualifying Round – 1955–56, 1956–57
