= Grimsby Rovers F.C. =

English association football club

- Full name: Grimsby Rovers Football Club
- Nicknames: Rovers, Red Rovers
- Founded: 1903
- Dissolved: 1926
- Ground: Littlefield Lane
- Chairman: G. H. Unwin
Home colours

== History ==
There were two Grimsby Rovers clubs in the 19th century; one which lasted from 1884 to 1887 which played at the Abbey Grounds off Victoria Street, and one which lasted only for the 1896–97 season, finishing bottom of the Grimsby and Cleethorpes Junior League Division 3 with 5 wins in 24 games, while the similarly-named Grimsby Humber Rovers finished 2nd in the top flight (to Grimsby Town Reserves).

The most successful Grimsby Rovers was founded in April 1903, as a sports club for employees of the Hagerup Doughty Ice Factory & Cold Storage Co Ltd, and which was known mostly as Hagerup & Doughty, but also Grimsby Hagerup & Doughty or Hagerup & Doughty United. The club gained its first significant success under its original name, when winning the Hull Times Cup for 1904–05, thanks to a 6–2 win over Hessle in the final.

The club changed its name to Grimsby Rovers before the 1905–06 season. Its first honour under this name arrived quickly - the 1904–05 Grimsby and District League had ended in a top-of-the-table tie between the Hageruy & Doughty and Haycroft Rovers clubs, and the play-off for the title did not take place until September 1906 [sic]; a first-half Harry Chantry goal won the title for the Rovers.

It took a step up in status 1909 when it entered the FA Cup for the first time, and in 1910–11 won the Lincolnshire Junior Cup for the first time, beating Scunthorpe & Lindsey United 2–1 at Blundell Park. A fortnight after this success, the Rovers beat Haycroft Rovers 2–1 in the Grimsby Charity Cup at the same venue.

In 1914 the club became the de facto third XI of Grimsby Town, although that arrangement did not last due to the First World War. However the club often supplied players to Town, with Rovers players taking the majority of places at a trial match at Blundell Park in 1920.

The club lost out on the Grimsby League title on the final day in 1922–23; needing a draw at Cleethorpes Town in the final match, the Meggies leapfrogged the Red Rovers with a 3–1 win. However Rovers took the Junior Cup for the second time in 1923–24 with a hard-fought revenge 1–0 win over Cleethorpes, despite injury reducing the side to 10 men for much of the game, and having taken three matches to get past Horncastle Town in the semi-final, and the same season beat Scunthorpe United Reserves (who were bolstered by three first XI regulars) 2–0 away to win the inaugural Grimsby Daily Telegraph Cup. Rovers continued to enter the FA Cup to 1926–27, reaching the third qualifying round in 1925–26. It also entered the FA Amateur Cup in 1922–23 and 1923–24, both times being eliminated at the final qualifying round stage; the latter occasion was particularly unfortunate as it beat the RAF Cranwell side in the fourth (and final) qualifying round, only for the tie to be voided.

The club's existence as a separate entity came to an end in July 1926. The lease on its ground expired at the end of the preceding season, and it was taken over by Louth Town, although the Rovers name was kept for the FA Cup preliminary round tie at Hull Dairycoates, as Rovers had put in an entry before the amalgamation. A trial game took place on 11 September 1926 to select the side, billed as Louth Town v Grimsby Rovers, and as a consequence the Cup side featured ten of the Rovers players. The Rovers' 6–2 defeat was the club's final FA Cup tie.

The Rovers name was used for county competitions in 1926–27 and for two final FA Amateur Cup entries in 1927–28 and 1928–29. However the entity behind the entries was Louth Town.

== Colours ==
The club wore red shirts and white shorts. As a result the club was often referred to as the Red Rovers, in contrast to rival Haycroft Rovers' green shirts.

== Ground ==
The club originally played at Clee Lane; after the First World War it moved to Cromwell Road. In 1924 the Rovers moved to Littlefield Lane.

== Notable players ==
- Former players ( 20 )
