= 1921–22 FA Cup qualifying rounds =

Tournament details
- Country: England; Wales

The 1921–22 FA Cup was the 47th season of the world's oldest football knockout competition; the Football Association Challenge Cup, or FA Cup for short.

The qualifying phase of the competition comprised eight rounds: an extra preliminary, preliminary and six sequentially numbered qualifying rounds. Twelve clubs won through to the first round proper draw from the 598 clubs who played in the qualifying rounds (including forty-eight in total who joined in qualifying rounds four and five).

== Rounds: draw information ==
For each successive round a draw was made pairing two teams for each tie. The default venue was the stadium of first of the two teams drawn; agreement was required from the FA to switch the venue; the FA could order a venue change if the appointed stadium was unsuitable. For matches where scores were level after ninety minutes a replay was arranged at the stadium of the team initially drawn as the away team; a thirty-minute extra time period was played if the scores were level after ninety minutes. If the replayed match was drawn further replays, with extra time if necessary, were held at neutral venues until a winner was determined.

Initially and through to the third qualifying round the draw was arranged into twenty-four geographic based divisions. As a large number of clubs entered the tournament from lower down the English football league system the competition started with an extra preliminary and preliminary rounds prior to the first qualifying round; matches were played in the divisions until the third qualifying round. For qualifying rounds four and five, stronger non-League and lower division Football League clubs were added to the draw. The final, sixth qualifying round, stage did not add any additional clubs to the draw and produced twelve clubs (from the 598 who contested the qualifying phase) to proceed to the first round proper.

Round	Draw Date	Date Played	Teams from Previous Round	Additional Teams	Total Teams	Ties Played
Extra preliminary round	17 June 1921	10 September 1921	–	342	342	171
Preliminary round	17 June 1921	24 September 1921	171	203	374	187
First qualifying round	17 June 1921	8 October 1921	187	5	192	96
Second qualifying round	11 October 1921	22 October 1921	96	0	96	48
Third qualifying round	26 October 1921	5 November 1921	48	0	48	24
Fourth qualifying round	7 November 1921	19 November 1921	24	24	48	24
Fifth qualifying round	21 November 1921	3 December 1921	24	24	48	24
Sixth qualifying round	5 December 1921	17 December 1921	24	0	24	12

Key to notes and abbreviations in the following tables
- Tie
  - Restaged – Restaged match (after original being abandoned)
  - Replay – Replay (after first match being a draw)
  - Replay 2; Replay 3 – Second replay; Third replay (usually played on a neutral ground)
- Notes
  - aband. – Match abandoned (with score shown in brackets)
  - aet – Match result after extra time played
  - void – Result voided (with score shown in brackets), reason as indicated
  - § – In the draw the away team were drawn as the home team
  - † – Win awarded. W: progressing club; x: eliminated club. Reason as indicated

== Extra preliminary to third qualifying round ==
The five rounds from the extra preliminary to the third qualifying involved 550 clubs from England and Wales. These were arranged into 24 geographically based divisions which thereby created matches against local rival clubs and limited the travelling required. Through a series of knock-out matches one team from each division progressed to the fourth qualifying round.

The number of clubs in each division varied: there were thirty-two clubs in divisions 8, 11 and 24 who all therefore played in the extra preliminary round, but only thirteen clubs in division 16 which commenced at the preliminary round with three clubs receiving byes into the first qualifying round.

=== Division 1 (Northumberland / Tyneside / Wearside) ===
The division comprised 21 teams, of which 10 were drawn into the extra preliminary round to reduce the number to 16 teams required for 8 preliminary round ties.

The Gateshead based Close Works club, members of the Northern Alliance, progressed from the division to the fourth qualifying round.

Tie	Home team	Score	Away team	Note
Extra preliminary round
	Close Works	2–1	Walker Celtic	
	Felling Colliery	1–0	Pandon Temperance	
	Newbiggin Athletic	–	Spen Black & White	
Replay	Spen Black & White	1–0	Newbiggin Athletic	
	Preston Colliery	1–0	Kibblesworth	
	St Anthony's Institute	0–1	Prudhoe Castle	
Preliminary round
	Bedlington United	2–1	Spen Black & White	
	Close Works	1–0	St Peters Albion	
	Chopwell Institute	1–0	Mickley	
	Felling Colliery	1–1	Newburn	
Replay	Newburn	1–5	Felling Colliery	
	Jarrow	3–0	Scotswood	
	Prudhoe Castle	0–0	Preston Colliery	
Replay	Preston Colliery	3–1	Prudhoe Castle	
	Seaton Delaval	4–0	Lintz Institute	
	Wallsend BC	3–1	Usworth Colliery	
First qualifying round
	Close Works	2–0	Chopwell Institute	
	Felling Colliery	3–1	Preston Colliery	
	Jarrow	1–0	Bedlington United	
	Seaton Delaval	0–1	Wallsend BC	
Second qualifying round
	Felling Colliery	0–2	Jarrow	
	Wallsend BC	1–1	Close Works	§
Replay	Wallsend BC	1–1	Close Works	aet
Replay 2	Wallsend BC	1–2	Close Works	aet @Wallsend
Third qualifying round
	Jarrow	2–2	Close Works	
Replay	Close Works	3–2	Jarrow	aet

=== Division 2 (County Durham / Tyneside / Wearside) ===
The division comprised 18 teams, of which 4 were drawn into the extra preliminary round to reduce the number to 16 teams required for 8 preliminary round ties.

Esh Winning, members of the Northern League, progressed from the division to the fourth qualifying round.

Tie	Home team	Score	Away team	Note
Extra preliminary round
	Chester-le-Street	3–0	White-le-Head Rangers	§
	Seaham CW	3–0	Langley Park	
Preliminary round
	Birtley	1–1	Spennymoor United	
Replay	Spennymoor United	1–2	Birtley	
	Chester-le-Street	2–0	Consett Celtic	
	Craghead United	1–0	Wingate Albion Comrades	
	Esh Winning	1–0	Horden Athletic	
	Houghton	2–3	Hobson Wanderers	
	Seaham CW	1–1	Dipton United	
Replay	Dipton United	0–3	Seaham CW	
	Seaham Harbour	2–0	Annfield Plain	
	Sunderland West End	1–0	Twizell United	
First qualifying round
	Chester-le-Street	2–0	Sunderland West End	
	Craghead United	1–2	Esh Winning	
	Seaham CW	0–0	Hobson Wanderers	
Replay	Hobson Wanderers	0–0	Seaham CW	Extra time not played
Replay 2	Hobson Wanderers	3–1	Seaham CW	aet
	Seaham Harbour	2–1	Birtley	
Second qualifying round
	Chester-le-Street	2–2	Esh Winning	
Replay	Esh Winning	1–0	Chester-le-Street	aet
	Hobson Wanderers	(0–2)	Seaham Harbour	aband.
Restaged	Hobson Wanderers	0–1	Seaham Harbour	
Third qualifying round
	Seaham Harbour	1–1	Esh Winning	
Replay	Esh Winning	6–1	Seaham Harbour	

=== Division 3 (County Durham / North Yorkshire / East Riding of Yorkshire) ===
The division comprised 22 teams, of which 12 were drawn into the extra preliminary round to reduce the number to 16 teams required for 8 preliminary round ties.

Shildon Athletic, members of the North Eastern League, progressed from the division to the fourth qualifying round. They progressed to the sixth qualifying round where they were eliminated by Brentford – they reached the furthest stage of any club who played in the extra preliminary round.

Tie	Home team	Score	Away team	Note
Extra preliminary round
	Bridlington Town	6–0	Staithes United	
	Haverton Hill	0–1	Rise Carr	
	Guisborough Belmont Athletic	0–2	Redcar	
	Shildon Athletic	2–0	Cockfield	§
	South Bank	5–1	Grangetown St Mary's	§
	Coundon United	1–2	Willington	
Preliminary round
	Bridlington Town	3–0	Brotton	
	Darlington Rlwy Athletic	0–0	Crook Town	
Replay	Crook Town	3–1	Darlington Rlwy Athletic	
	Filey	0–1	Scarborough	
	Redcar	0–4	Loftus Albion	
	Shildon Athletic	5–0	Tow Law Town	
	South Bank East End	1–0	South Bank	
	Stockton	2–1	Stanley United	
	Willington	4–1	Rise Carr	
First qualifying round
	Bridlington Town	1–1	Scarborough	
Replay	Scarborough	2–0	Bridlington Town	
	Crook Town	9–0	South Bank East End	
	Stockton	1–0	Loftus Albion	
	Willington	0–1	Shildon Athletic	
Second qualifying round
	Crook Town	1–1	Shildon Athletic	
Replay	Shildon Athletic	4–0	Crook Town	
	Stockton	5–3	Scarborough	
Third qualifying round
	Shildon Athletic	3–1	Stockton	

=== Division 4 (Cumbria) ===
The division comprised 21 teams, of which 10 were drawn into the extra preliminary round to reduce the number to 16 teams required for 8 preliminary round ties.

Carlisle United, members of the North Eastern League, progressed from the division to the fourth qualifying round.

Tie	Home team	Score	Away team	Note
Extra preliminary round
	Bowthorn Recreation	0–3	Workington DS&S	
	Whitehaven Athletic	0–2	Kells White Star	
	Whitehaven CR	1–0	Workington AFC	
	Wigton Harriers	1–0	Egremont	
	Windermere	2–4	Moor Row Villa Rovers	
Preliminary round
	Appleby	2–2	Cleator Moor Celtic	
Replay	Cleator Moor Celtic	W–x	Appleby (scratched)	†
	Arlecdon Red Rose	3–0	Kells White Star	
	Carlisle United	5–0	Vickerstown	§
	Parton Athletic	1–3	Wath Brow United	
	Penrith	2–0	Frizington Athletic	
	Ulverston	0–1	Moor Row Villa Rovers	
	Whitehaven CR	2–2	Dalton Casuals	§
Replay	Whitehaven CR	3–0	Dalton Casuals	
	Workington DS&S	3–3	Wigton Harriers	
Replay	Wigton Harriers	2–3	Workington DS&S	
First qualifying round
	Arlecdon Red Rose	4–1	Workington DS&S	
	Carlisle United	6–1	Penrith	
	Moor Row Villa Rovers	3–0	Wath Brow United	
	Whitehaven CR	0–3	Cleator Moor Celtic	
Second qualifying round
	Carlisle United	8–0	Arlecdon Red Rose	
	Cleator Moor Celtic	3–0	Moor Row Villa Rovers	
Third qualifying round
	Carlisle United	2–0	Cleator Moor Celtic	

=== Division 5 (Lancashire / West Riding of Yorkshire border) ===
The division comprised 15 teams from which 7 preliminary round ties with drawn, resulting in a bye to the first qualifying round for Lancaster Town (members of the Lancashire Combination) who progressed from the division. In both the fourth and fifth qualifying rounds they defeated Third Division North clubs (Barrow and Stockport County respectively) before being eliminated in the sixth qualifying round by Third Division South club Northampton Town.

Tie	Home team	Score	Away team	Note
Preliminary round
	Burscough Rangers	1–1	Chorley	
Replay	Chorley	4–2	Burscough Rangers	
	Fleetwood	3–0	Dick, Kerr's	§
	Great Harwood	2–3	Darwen	
	Leyland	4–3	Breightmet United	§
	Morecambe	0–0	Horwich RMI	
Replay	Horwich RMI	2–1	Morecambe	
	Rossendale United	6–1	Cornholme	
	Skelmersdale United	1–0	Portsmouth Rovers	
First qualifying round
	Chorley	0–1	Fleetwood	
	Darwen	5–2	Rossendale United	
	Horwich RMI	1–5	Lancaster Town	
	Leyland	2–0	Skelmersdale United	
Second qualifying round
	Fleetwood	2–1	Darwen	
	Lancaster Town	2–0	Leyland	
Third qualifying round
	Lancaster Town	2–1	Fleetwood	

=== Division 6 (Lancashire / Cheshire / Derbyshire) ===
The division comprised 21 teams, of which 10 were drawn into the extra preliminary round to reduce the number to 16 teams required for 8 preliminary round ties.

Altrincham, members of the Cheshire County League, progressed from the division to the fourth qualifying round.

Tie	Home team	Score	Away team	Note
Extra preliminary round
	Glossop	1–4	Atherton F.C.	
	New Brighton	3–5	Whiston Parish	
	North Liverpool	3–1	Marlborough Old Boys	
	Runcorn	3–2	Old Xaverians	
	Youlgreave	1–1	Chapel-en-le-Frith	
Replay	Chapel-en-le-Frith	1–1	Youlgreave	
Replay 2	Youlgreave	1–5	Chapel-en-le-Frith	
Preliminary round
	Altrincham	8–0	North Liverpool	
	Atherton F.C.	7–0	Buxton	
	Chapel-en-le-Frith	3–2	Marine	
	Eccles United	9–0	Prescot Wire Works	
	Hurst	1–0	Prescot	
	Monks Hall	W–x	Congleton Town (scratched)	†
	Runcorn	2–0	Garston Gasworks	
	Whiston Parish	2–2	Sandbach Ramblers	
Replay	Sandbach Ramblers	1–1	Whiston Parish	Extra time not played
Replay 2	Whiston Parish	1–1	Sandbach Ramblers	aet @ Crewe
Replay 3	Whiston Parish	W–x	Sandbach Ramblers (Unable to raise a team)	†
First qualifying round
	Atherton F.C.	2–4	Whiston Parish	
	Hurst	0–1	Eccles United	
	Monks Hall	0–1	Altrincham	
	Runcorn	4–1	Chapel-en-le-Frith	
Second qualifying round
	Altrincham	4–1	Eccles United	
	Whiston Parish	0–1	Runcorn	
Third qualifying round
	Runcorn	1–3	Altrincham	

=== Division 7 (Cheshire / North Shropshire / North Wales) ===
The division comprised 17 teams, of which 2 were drawn into the extra preliminary round to reduce the number to 16 teams required for 8 preliminary round ties.

Chester, members of the Cheshire County League, progressed from the division to the fourth qualifying round.

Tie	Home team	Score	Away team	Note
Extra preliminary round
	Chester	7–0	Machynlleth	
Preliminary round
	Buckley United	2–1	Kinderton Victoria	
	Chester	3–1	Ellesmere Port Town	
	Connah's Quay	3–0	Gresford	
	Harrowby	2–0	Macclesfield	
	Lostock Gralam	2–1	Whitchurch	
	Nantwich Town	4–2	Witton Albion	
	Oswestry Town	0–0	Northwich Victoria	
Replay	Northwich Victoria	3–1	Oswestry Town	
	Winsford United	2–0	Hoylake	
First qualifying round
	Buckley United	0–0	Connah's Quay	
Replay	Connah's Quay	2–0	Buckley United	
	Chester	2–0	Lostock Gralam	
	Nantwich Town	0–1	Harrowby	
	Winsford United	0–2	Northwich Victoria	
Second qualifying round
	Harrowby	1–3	Chester	
	Northwich Victoria	2–0	Connah's Quay	
Third qualifying round
	Chester	3–3	Northwich Victoria	
Replay	Northwich Victoria	0–1	Chester	

=== Division 8 (West Midlands) ===
The division comprised 32 teams from the counties of Herefordshire, Shropshire, Staffordshire, Warwickshire and Worcestershire. All of the teams were drawn into the extra preliminary round.

Darlaston, members of the Birmingham & District League, progressed from the division to the fourth qualifying round.

Tie	Home team	Score	Away team	Note
Extra preliminary round
	Atherstone Town	1–0	Bloxwich Strollers	
	Bilston United	6–1	Walsall Phoenix	
	Brierley Hill Alliance	5–0	Hereford St Martin's	
	Darlaston	2–2	Bilston Amateurs	§
Replay	Darlaston	7–1	Bilston Amateurs	
	Hereford Thistle	0–0	Bromsgrove Rovers	
Replay	Bromsgrove Rovers	W–x	Hereford Thistle (scratched)	†
	Donnington Wood Institute	1–3	Oakengates Town	
	Kidderminster Harriers	0–0	Redditch	
Replay	Redditch	2–0	Kidderminster Harriers	
	Nuneaton Town	2–0	Wellington Town	
	Rugeley	1–2	Cannock Town	
	Stourbridge	0–1	Halesowen	
	Rushall Olympic	2–1	West Birmingham	
	Sunbeam Motors	1–3	Willenhall	
	Talbot Stead	2–1	Birmingham Corp Tramways	
	Wednesbury Old Athletic	1–2	Stafford Rangers	
	Wellington St George's	5–1	Wolverhampton Amateurs	§
	Worcester City	2–2	Cradley Heath St Luke's	
Replay	Cradley Heath St Luke's	2–1	Worcester City	
Preliminary round
	Atherstone Town	2–1	Bilston United	
	Brierley Hill Alliance	1–2	Bromsgrove Rovers	
	Cannock Town	4–1	Halesowen	
	Cradley Heath St Luke's	3–1	Worcester City	
	Darlaston	4–1	Rushall Olympic	
	Nuneaton Town	4–0	Redditch	
	Oakengates Town	2–3	Talbot Stead	
	Wellington St George's	3–1	Stafford Rangers	
First qualifying round
	Atherstone Town	1–2	Cannock Town	
	Bromsgrove Rovers	2–2	Darlaston	
Replay	Darlaston	1–0	Bromsgrove Rovers	
	Nuneaton Town	2–1	Talbot Stead	§
	Wellington St George's	3–1	Cradley Heath St Luke's	
Second qualifying round
	Darlaston	8–2	Cannock Town	
	Wellington St George's	4–2	Nuneaton Town	
Third qualifying round
	Wellington St George's	1–2	Darlaston	

=== Division 9 (East Nottinghamshire / East Riding of Yorkshire / North Lincolnshire) ===
The division comprised 22 teams, of which 12 were drawn into the extra preliminary round to reduce the number to 16 teams required for 8 preliminary round ties.

Gainsborough Trinity, members of the Midland League, progressed from the division to the fourth qualifying round.

Tie	Home team	Score	Away team	Note
Extra preliminary round
	Brunswick Institute	2–0	Hornsea Town	
	Earles Welfare	1–3	West Hull Albion	
	Goole Shipyards	0–2	Brigg Town	
	Grimsby Haycroft Rovers	3–2	Cleethorpes Town	
	Louth Town	3–2	Barton Town	
	Retford Town	8–0	British Oil and Cake Mills	
Preliminary round
	Brigg Town	0–1	Holderness Athletic	
	Brunswick Institute	1–5	Hook Shipyards	
	Charltons (Grimsby)	0–3	Brodsworth Main	
	Gainsborough Trinity	5–0	West Hull Albion	
	Grimsby Haycroft Rovers	2–1	Hull Old Boys	
	Grimsby Rovers	3–2	Bentley Colliery	
	Marfleet	4–1	Louth Town	
	Retford Town	1–2	Scunthorpe & Lindsey United	
First qualifying round
	Brodsworth Main	3–1	Grimsby Rovers	
	Gainsborough Trinity	7–0	Marfleet	§
	Grimsby Haycroft Rovers	2–0	Hook Shipyards	
	Scunthorpe & Lindsey United	10–0	Holderness Athletic	
Second qualifying round
	Gainsborough Trinity	7–1	Grimsby Haycroft Rovers	§
	Scunthorpe & Lindsey United	4–1	Brodsworth Main	
Third qualifying round
	Gainsborough Trinity	2–0	Scunthorpe & Lindsey United	

=== Division 10 (West Riding of Yorkshire) ===
The draw comprised 30 teams, of which 28 were drawn into the extra preliminary round to reduce the number to 16 teams required for 8 preliminary round ties.

Frickley Colliery, members of the Sheffield Association League, progressed from the division to the fourth qualifying round.

Tie	Home team	Score	Away team	Note
Extra preliminary round
	Blakeborough & Sons	2–0	Rawdon	
	Boothtown	5–2	Acomb WMC (York)	
	Bowling Albion	2–1	Harrogate	
	Frickley Colliery	1–0	Altofts West Riding Col.	
	Halifax Town (Division 3N commitments)	x–W	Mytholmroyd	†
	Hebden Bridge	0–0	Liversedge	
Replay	Liversedge	4–1	Hebden Bridge	
	Glasshoughton Colliery	0–4	Castleford & Allerton United	
	Horsforth	1–5	Methley Perseverance	
	Rothwell Athletic	6–1	Crofton United	§
	Rowntrees	W–x	Guiseley (scratched)	†
	Selby Town	3–1	Leeds Steel Works	
	South Kirkby Colliery	2–1	Calverley	
	Thornton United	W–x	Fryston Colliery (scratched)	†
	Wakefield City	W–x	Allerton Bywater Colliery (Merged with Castleford Utd)	†
Preliminary round
	Boothtown	2–1	Rowntrees	
	Castleford Town	6–1	Blakeborough & Sons	
	Frickley Colliery	3–0	Bowling Albion	
	Liversedge	1–1	South Kirkby Colliery	
Replay	South Kirkby Colliery	2–0	Liversedge	
	Methley Perseverance	1–1	Castleford & Allerton United	
Replay	Castleford & Allerton United	2–0	Methley Perseverance	
	Mytholmroyd	1–1	Rothwell Athletic	
Replay	Rothwell Athletic	6–2	Mytholmroyd	
	Thornton United	0–2	Selby Town	
	Wakefield City	3–1	Apperley Bridge	
First qualifying round
	Boothtown	1–3	Frickley Colliery	
	Selby Town	2–2	Castleford Town	
Replay	Castleford Town	4–2	Selby Town	
	South Kirkby Colliery	0–2	Castleford & Allerton United	
	Wakefield City	3–0	Rothwell Athletic	
Second qualifying round
	Castleford & Allerton United	1–1	Wakefield City	
Replay	Wakefield City	0–2	Castleford & Allerton United	
	Frickley Colliery	2–1	Castleford Town	
Third qualifying round
	Frickley Colliery	2–0	Castleford & Allerton United	

=== Division 11 (South Yorkshire) ===
The draw for the division comprised 32 teams all of which were drawn into the extra preliminary round.

Wombwell, members of the Yorkshire League, progressed from the division to the fourth qualifying round.

Tie	Home team	Score	Away team	Note
Extra preliminary round
	Ardsley Athletic	1–3	Denaby United	
	Birdwell	3–2	Prospect United	
	Bullcroft Main Colliery	3–0	Tankersley	
	Cudworth Village	3–1	Hoyland Common Wesleyans	
	Dinnington Main Colliery	3–4	Silverwood Colliery	
	Dodworth United	2–0	Hoyland St Peter's	
	Doncaster Rovers	2–0	Rotherham Town	
	Grimethorpe Colliery Institute	0–0	Rossington Main	
Replay	Rossington Main	1–0	Grimethorpe Colliery Institute	
	Houghton Main Colliery	2–2	Mexborough	
Replay	Mexborough	1–0	Houghton Main Colliery	
	Maltby Main Colliery	0–0	Wath Athletic	
Replay	Wath Athletic	1–1	Maltby Main Colliery	aet
Replay 2	Wath Athletic	2–1	Maltby Main Colliery	@Wath
	Mexborough Loco. Works	1–0	Laughton Common	
	Rawmarsh Athletic	3–2	Rotherham Amateurs	§
	Thurnscoe Park Avenue (scratched)	x–W	Monckton Athletic	†
	Treeton Reading Room	1–1	Ryecroft Athletic	
Replay	Ryecroft Athletic	0–1	Treeton Reading Room	
	Wombwell	5–1	Anston Athletic	§
	Wombwell Main	1–4	Hemmingfield Athletic	
Preliminary round
	Birdwell	1–1	Rossington Main	
Replay	Rossington Main	1–1	Birdwell	aet
Replay 2	Birdwell	2–1	Rossington Main	@Rotherham
	Bullcroft Main Colliery	1–0	Rawmarsh Athletic	
	Cudworth Village	1–0	Wath Athletic	
	Hemmingfield Athletic	5–1	Dodworth United	
	Mexborough	1–2	Denaby United	
	Monckton Athletic	1–2	Silverwood Colliery	
	Treeton Reading Room	1–4	Mexborough Loco. Works	
	Wombwell	1–0	Doncaster Rovers	
First qualifying round
	Birdwell	2–0	Silverwood Colliery	
	Cudworth Village	0–1	Bullcroft Main Colliery	
	Denaby United	3–1	Mexborough Loco. Works	§
	Wombwell	5–1	Hemmingfield Athletic	§
Second qualifying round
	Denaby United	3–0	Bullcroft Main Colliery	
	Wombwell	1–1	Birdwell	
Replay	Birdwell	0–1	Wombwell	aet
Third qualifying round
	Wombwell	3–1	Denaby United	

=== Division 12 (Derbyshire / South Yorkshire) ===
The division comprised 27 teams from which 11 extra preliminary round ties were drawn, to reduce the number to 16 teams required for 8 preliminary round ties.

Staveley Town, members of the Derbyshire Senior League, progressed from the division to the fourth qualifying round.

Tie	Home team	Score	Away team	Note
Extra preliminary round
	Atlas & Norfolk Works	2–0	Clay Cross Town	
	Beighton Recreation	1–5	Eckington Works	
	Clay Cross Zingari	1–3	Long Eaton	
	Handsworth (Yorks) WMC	2–1	Heanor Town	
	Hardwick Colliery	3–2	Matlock Town	
	Kilnhurst United	2–1	Sheepbridge Works	
	Marsden Moor Athletic	W–x	Darnell Wellington (withdrew)	†
	New Tupton United	3–2	Kiveton Park	
	Sheffield	1–2	Grassmoor Ivanhoe	
	Tinsley WMC	2–0	Dronfield Woodhouse	
	Woodhouse	1–0	Chesterfield Corinthians	§
Preliminary round
	Blackwell Colliery	3–2	Handsworth (Yorks) WMC	
	Bolsover Colliery	2–2	Atlas & Norfolk Works	
Replay	Atlas & Norfolk Works	1–0	Bolsover Colliery	aet
	Eckington Works	1–1	Hardwick Colliery	
Replay	Hardwick Colliery	3–2	Eckington Works	aet
	Grassmoor Ivanhoe	0–1	Staveley Town	
	Ilkeston United	4–0	New Tupton United	
	South Normanton Colliery	3–1	Marsden Moor Athletic	
	Tinsley WMC	4–1	Kilnhurst United	
	Woodhouse	1–1	Long Eaton	
Replay	Long Eaton	1–1	Woodhouse	aet
Replay 2	Woodhouse	3–2	Long Eaton	@Chesterfield
First qualifying round
	Atlas & Norfolk Works	1–1	Hardwick Colliery	
Replay	Hardwick Colliery	2–3	Atlas & Norfolk Works	
	Ilkeston United	1–0	South Normanton Colliery	
	Tinsley WMC	2–2	Staveley Town	
Replay	Staveley Town	1–0	Tinsley WMC	aet
	Woodhouse	2–2	Blackwell Colliery	
Replay	Blackwell Colliery	3–1	Woodhouse	
Second qualifying round
	Ilkeston United	7–0	Atlas & Norfolk Works	
	Staveley Town	4–2	Blackwell Colliery	
Third qualifying round
	Ilkeston United	0–0	Staveley Town	
	Staveley Town	1–0	Ilkeston United	

=== Division 13 (Nottinghamshire / South Lincolnshire) ===
The division comprised 25 teams, of which 18 were drawn into the extra preliminary round to reduce the number to 16 teams required for 8 preliminary round ties.

Mansfield Town, members of the Midland League, progressed from the division to the fourth qualifying round.

Tie	Home team	Score	Away team	Note
Extra preliminary round
	Creswell Colliery	0–0	Lenton	
Replay	Lenton	2–1	Creswell Colliery	
	Ericsson Athletic	1–4	Sutton Town	
	Hucknall Byron	2–3	Basford United	
	New Hucknall Colliery	1–3	Clifton Colliery	
	Mansfield Woodhouse Exchange	2–2	Newark Athletic	
Replay	Newark Athletic	4–2	Mansfield Woodhouse Exchange	aet
	Sneinton	0–4	Mansfield Colliery	
	Stanton Hill DS&S	2–0	Arnold St Mary's	
	Sutton Junction	1–0	Rufford Colliery	
	Whitwell Colliery	1–2	Pinxton	
Preliminary round
	Basford United	1–1	Sutton Junction	
Replay	Sutton Junction	5–1	Basford United	
	Clifton Colliery	2–1	Newark Athletic	
	Netherfield Rangers	0–8	Boots Athletic	
	Mansfield Town	8–0	Mansfield Colliery	
	Shirebrook	3–4	Grantham	
	Stanton Hill DS&S	3–1	Lenton	
	Sutton Town	1–2	Pinxton	
	Welbeck Colliery	6–1	Kirkby Collieries	
First qualifying round
	Clifton Colliery	0–1	Pinxton	
	Grantham	6–2	Boots Athletic	
	Mansfield Town	6–0	Stanton Hill DS&S	
	Sutton Junction	0–1	Welbeck Colliery	
Second qualifying round
	Mansfield Town	2–0	Grantham	§
	Pinxton	0–0	Welbeck Colliery	
Replay	Welbeck Colliery	(2–0)	Pinxton	aband.
Replay 2	Welbeck Colliery	1–0	Pinxton	@Mansfield
Third qualifying round
	Welbeck Colliery	1–2	Mansfield Town	

=== Division 14 (Derbyshire / Staffordshire / Leicestershire / Warwickshire) ===
The division comprised 20 teams, of which 8 were drawn into the extra preliminary round to reduce the number to 16 teams required for 8 preliminary round ties.

Burton All Saints, members of the Birmingham & District League, progressed from the division to the fourth qualifying round.

Tie	Home team	Score	Away team	Note
Extra preliminary round
	Burton Werneth Rangers	1–5	Loughborough Corinthians	
	Netherseal Colliery	1–1	Newhall Swifts	
Replay	Newhall Swifts	2–0	Netherseal Colliery	
	Shepshed Albion	2–2	Tamworth Castle	
Replay	Tamworth Castle	3–0	Shepshed Albion	
	Stableford Works	1–0	Moira United	
Preliminary round
	Ashby Town	2–5	Stableford Works	
	Burton All Saints	W–x	Brush Works (Loughborough) (scratched)	†
	Hinckley United	7–1	Barwell United	
	Coalville Swifts	1–2	Newhall Swifts	
	Gresley Colliery	1–1	Coalville Town	
Replay	Coalville Town	0–3	Gresley Colliery	
	Loughborough Corinthians	2–0	Gresley Rovers	
	Rugby Town	1–2	Whitwick Imperial	
	Tamworth Castle	W–x	Ashbourne Town (withdrew)	†
First qualifying round
	Burton All Saints	5–0	Gresley Colliery	
	Loughborough Corinthians	2–1	Whitwick Imperial	
	Newhall Swifts	2–0	Tamworth Castle	
	Stableford Works	1–4	Hinckley United	
Second qualifying round
	Burton All Saints	3–0	Newhall Swifts	
	Hinckley United	2–6	Loughborough Corinthians	
Third qualifying round
	Loughborough Corinthians	1–3	Burton All Saints	

=== Division 15 (Lincolnshire / Northamptonshire / Bedfordshire) ===
The division comprised 21 teams, of which 10 were drawn into the extra preliminary round to reduce the number to 16 teams required for 8 preliminary round ties.

Irthlingborough Town, members of the Northamptonshire League, progressed from the division to the fourth qualifying round.

Tie	Home team	Score	Away team	Note
Extra preliminary round
	Peterborough G.N. Loco	2–0	Boston St Nicholas	
	Spalding United	7–0	Bourne Town	
	Spilsby Town	2–6	Higham Ferrers	
	Stamford	5–2	Raunds Town	
	Wellingborough Town	3–0	Daventry Victoria	
Preliminary round
	Bedford Town	1–1	Fletton United	
Replay	Fletton United	2–0	Bedford Town	aet
	Brotherhood Works	3–3	Wellingborough Town	
Replay	Wellingborough Town	3–0	Brotherhood Works	
	Harborough Town	3–1	Horncastle Town	
	Higham Ferrers	0–1	Desborough Town	
	Northampton Wanderers	1–3	Boston	
	Peterborough G.N. Loco	4–1	Rushden Town	
	Peterborough Westwood Wks	1–5	Irthlingborough Town	
	Stamford	2–1	Spalding United	
First qualifying round
	Boston	7–0	Peterborough G.N. Loco	
	Desborough Town	4–0	Harborough Town	
	Irthlingborough Town	4–1	Stamford	
	Fletton United	1–0	Wellingborough Town	
Second qualifying round
	Desborough Town	1–2	Boston	
	Fletton United	2–2	Irthlingborough Town	
Replay	Irthlingborough Town	2–0	Fletton United	
Third qualifying round
	Boston	0–1	Irthlingborough Town	

=== Division 16 (Norfolk / Suffolk / Cambridgeshire / NE Essex) ===
The division comprised 13 teams from which 5 preliminary round ties were drawn, resulting in byes to the first qualifying round for 3 teams; Colchester Town, Leiston Works Athletic and Cambridge Town. The latter club, members of the Southern Amateur League, progressed from the division to the fourth qualifying round.

Tie	Home team	Score	Away team	Note
Preliminary round
	Bury St Edmund's	2–3	Norwich CEYMS	
	Clacton Town	2–0	Cromer	
	Great Yarmouth Town	5–1	Lowestoft	
	Harwich & Parkeston	7–2	Thetford Town	
	Lynn Town	1–3	Norwich Institute	
First qualifying round
	Harwich & Parkeston	6–0	Great Yarmouth Town	
	Leiston Works Athletic	2–3	Cambridge Town	
	Norwich CEYMS	1–0	Colchester Town	
	Norwich Institute	0–2	Clacton Town	
Second qualifying round
	Cambridge Town	1–1	Harwich & Parkeston	
Replay	Harwich & Parkeston	1–5	Cambridge Town	
	Clacton Town	1–2	Norwich CEYMS	
Third qualifying round
	Norwich CEYMS	1–1	Cambridge Town	
Replay	Cambridge Town	2–1	Norwich CEYMS	

=== Division 17 (Essex / East London) ===
The draw for the division comprised 16 teams who were all drawn into the preliminary round.

Clapton, members of the Isthmian League, progressed from the division to the fourth qualifying round.

Tie	Home team	Score	Away team	Note
Preliminary round
	Chelmsford	W–x	Green & Silley Weir (club disbanded)	†
	Clapton	4–1	GER Romford	
	Custom House	W–x	Southend Corinthians (scratched)	†
	Gnome Athletic	0–1	Walthamstow Avenue	§
	Grays Athletic	2–2	Sterling Athletic	
Replay	Grays Athletic	2–1	Sterling Athletic	@Grays
	Leyton	W–x	Chelmsford Rollers (club wound up)	†
	Shoeburyness Garrison	1–5	Barking Town	
	Walthamstow Grange	7–0	Newportonians	
First qualifying round
	Clapton	3–0	Chelmsford	
	Custom House	0–2	Grays Athletic	
	Leyton	2–4	Barking Town	
	Walthamstow Avenue	1–7	Walthamstow Grange	
Second qualifying round
	Barking Town	0–1	Clapton	
	Grays Athletic	2–1	Walthamstow Grange	
Third qualifying round
	Grays Athletic	1–6	Clapton	

=== Division 18 (Bedfordshire / Hertfordshire / Middlesex) ===
The division comprised 25 teams, of which 18 were drawn into the extra preliminary round to reduce the number to 16 teams required for 8 preliminary round ties.

St Albans City, members of the Athenian League, progressed from the division to the fourth qualifying round.

Tie	Home team	Score	Away team	Note
Extra preliminary round
	Biggleswade & District	0–0	Hitchin Blue Cross	
Replay	Hitchin Blue Cross	0–2	Biggleswade & District	
	Chiswick Town	0–2	Edmonton	
	Enfield	0–0	Cheshunt	
Replay	Cheshunt	1–3	Enfield	
	Harrow Weald	2–1	Wood Green Town	
	Hertford Town	2–1	Luton Amateurs	
	Leavesden Mental Hospital	4–1	Arlington	
	Letchworth Town	0–0	Waterlows (Dunstable)	
Replay	Waterlows (Dunstable)	3–2	Letchworth Town	
	RAF Henlow	3–1	Berkhamsted Comrades	
	Watford Old Boys	1–3	Finchley	
Preliminary round
	Enfield	1–1	Biggleswade & District	
Replay	Biggleswade & District	1–2	Enfield	
	Fricker's Athletic	2–1	Finchley	
	Hampstead Town	3–0	Barnet	
	Hertford Town	2–6	Polytechnic	
	RAF Henlow	2–0	Leavesden Mental Hospital	
	St Albans City	4–1	Edmonton	§
	Waterlows (Dunstable)	1–1	Harrow Weald	
Replay	Harrow Weald	0–0	Waterlows (Dunstable)	aet
Replay 2	Waterlows (Dunstable)	W–x	Harrow Weald (Unable to field a team)	†
	Wealdstone	0–0	Luton Clarence	
Replay	Luton Clarence	0–3	Wealdstone	
First qualifying round
	Enfield	0–2	RAF Henlow	
	Hampstead Town	1–0	Wealdstone	
	Polytechnic	2–4	St Albans City	
	Waterlows (Dunstable)	0–2	Fricker's Athletic	
Second qualifying round
	Hampstead Town	2–4	St Albans City	
	RAF Henlow	2–1	Fricker's Athletic	
Third qualifying round
	RAF Henlow	0–3	St Albans City	

=== Division 19 (Berkshire / Buckinghamshire / Oxfordshire) ===
The division comprised 15 teams from which 7 preliminary round ties were drawn, resulting in byes to the first qualifying round for Wycombe Wanderers.

Aylesbury United, members of the Spartan League, progressed from the division to the fourth qualifying round.

Tie	Home team	Score	Away team	Note
Preliminary round
	Aylesbury United	4–1	Henley Town	
	Botwell Mission	4–1	Marlow	
	Henley Comrades	1–2	Reading Amateurs	
	Newbury Town	1–1	Southall	
Replay	Southall	3–1	Newbury Town	
	Maidenhead United	3–2	Windsor & Eton	
	Uxbridge	1–1	Slough	
Replay	Slough	4–1	Uxbridge	
	Yiewsley	0–5	Chesham United	
First qualifying round
	Aylesbury United	6–1	Maidenhead United	
	Chesham United	3–2	Botwell Mission	
	Reading Amateurs	1–0	Southall	
	Wycombe Wanderers	2–2	Slough	
Replay	Slough	3–1	Wycombe Wanderers	
Second qualifying round
	Aylesbury United	7–0	Reading Amateurs	
	Slough	2–0	Chesham United	
Third qualifying round
	Slough	1–1	Aylesbury United	
Replay	Aylesbury United	2–1	Slough	

=== Division 20 (Surrey / West Sussex border) ===
The division comprised 24 teams, of which 16 were drawn into the extra preliminary round to reduce the number to 16 teams required for 8 preliminary round ties.

Guildford United, members of the Southern League, progressed from the division to the fourth qualifying round.

Tie	Home team	Score	Away team	Note
Extra preliminary round
	Aldershot Excelsior	1–1	Aldershot Institute Albion	
Replay	Aldershot Institute Albion	2–1	Aldershot Excelsior	aet
	East Grinstead	1–6	Guildford United	
	Farnham United Breweries	3–4	Sutton United	
	Leyland Motors (Kingston)	1–1	Croydon	
Replay	Croydon	1–1	Leyland Motors (Kingston)	aet
Replay 2	Leyland Motors (Kingston)	0–2	Croydon	@Wimbledon
	RAE Farnborough	1–4	Camberley & Yorktown	
	Tooting Town	4–1	Dorking	
	Wellington Works	2–1	Burberry Athletic	
	Woking	1–0	Earlsfield Town	
Preliminary round
	Aldershot Institute Albion	1–0	Tooting Town	
	Croydon	2–3	Camberley & Yorktown	
	Guildford United	2–2	Woking	
Replay	Woking	1–2	Guildford United	aet
	Kingstonian	1–0	Walton-on-Thames	
	Redhill	4–0	Guildford	
	Hersham United (scratched)	x–W	Sutton United	†
	Wellington Works	1–4	Summerstown	
	Wimbledon	2–1	West Norwood	
First qualifying round
	Aldershot Institute Albion	2–4	Guildford United	
	Kingstonian	2–2	Camberley & Yorktown	
Replay	Camberley & Yorktown	2–1	Kingstonian	
	Sutton United	1–1	Redhill	
Replay	Redhill	2–0	Sutton United	aet
	Wimbledon	0–0	Summerstown	
Replay	Summerstown	1–2	Wimbledon	
Second qualifying round
	Guildford United	3–2	Camberley & Yorktown	
	Redhill	0–0	Wimbledon	
Replay	Wimbledon	6–3	Redhill	
Third qualifying round
	Guildford United	3–3	Wimbledon	
Replay	Wimbledon	(1–2)	Guildford United	aband.
Replay	Wimbledon	0–1	Guildford United	

=== Division 21 (Kent / Sussex) ===
The division comprised 28 teams, of which 24 were drawn into the extra preliminary round to reduce the number to 16 teams required for 8 preliminary round ties.

Northfleet United, members of the Kent League, progressed from the division to the fourth qualifying round.

Tie	Home team	Score	Away team	Note
Extra preliminary round
	Ashford Railway Works	3–1	RN Depot	
	Belvedere	3–1	Bostall Heath	
	Catford Southend	0–0	Folkestone	
Replay	Folkestone	3–0	Catford Southend	
	Charlton Athletic (Division 3S commitments)	x–W	Margate	†
	Cray Wanderers	1–3	Sheppey United	
	Dartford	2–1	Ramsgate	
	Hastings & St Leonards	1–1	Shoreham	
Replay	Shoreham	3–1	Hastings & St Leonards	
	Newhaven	0–2	Royal Engrs. Comrades	
	Southwick	0–3	Vernon Athletic	
	Tunbridge Wells Rangers	0–3	Sittingbourne	
	Woolwich	2–1	Bexleyheath Labour	
	Woolwich Polytechnic	2–4	Whitstable	
Preliminary round
	Bromley	2–0	Royal Engrs. Comrades	
	Chatham	1–1	Woolwich	
Replay	Woolwich	0–1	Chatham	
	Dartford	3–1	Vernon Athletic	§
	Sheppey United	4–2	Ashford Railway Works	
	Shoreham	0–6	Northfleet United	
	Sittingbourne	0–2	Margate	
	Whitstable	2–6	Folkestone	
	Worthing	2–0	Belvedere	
First qualifying round
	Chatham	2–0	Bromley	
	Folkestone	3–1	Sheppey United	
	Margate	0–1	Northfleet United	
	Worthing	0–0	Dartford	
Replay	Dartford	1–0	Worthing	
Second qualifying round
	Chatham	3–1	Dartford	
	Northfleet United	4–2	Folkestone	
Third qualifying round
	Chatham	0–3	Northfleet United	

=== Division 22 (Hampshire / Dorset / Isle of Wight) ===
The division comprised 23 teams from which 7 extra preliminary round ties were drawn, to reduce the number to 16 teams required for 8 preliminary round ties.

Boscombe, members of the Southern League, progressed from the division to the fourth qualifying round.

Tie	Home team	Score	Away team	Note
Extra preliminary round
	Basingstoke	1–2	RGA Gosport	
	Gosport Athletic	1–0	Portsea Gas Company	
	Harland & Wolffs	3–1	Portland United	
	Osborne Athletic	1–3	Bournemouth Gasworks Ath.	
	Ryde Sports	2–3	Poole	
	Thornycroft Ath (Basingstoke)	3–1	Eastleigh Athletic	
	Westham (Weymouth)	3–0	East Cowes Victoria Athletic	
Preliminary round
	Blandford	0–2	Bournemouth Amateurs	
	Boscombe	2–0	RGA Gosport	§
	Cowes	2–2	Poole	
Replay	Poole	1–1	Cowes	aet
Replay 2	Cowes	1–0	Poole	@Lymington
	Harland & Wolffs	2–0	Bournemouth Gasworks Ath.	
	Portsmouth Amateurs	2–2	Gosport Athletic	
Replay	Gosport Athletic	0–1	Portsmouth Amateurs	
	Sholing Athletic	2–0	Thornycroft Ath (Basingstoke)	
	Thornycrofts (Woolston)	1–1	Bournemouth Tramways	
Replay	Bournemouth Tramways	2–2	Thornycrofts (Woolston)	aet
Replay 2	Thornycrofts (Woolston)	2–1	Bournemouth Tramways	@Boscombe
	Westham (Weymouth)	0–3	Weymouth	
First qualifying round
	Bournemouth Amateurs	0–0	Boscombe	
Replay	Boscombe	6–0	Bournemouth Amateurs	
	Portsmouth Amateurs	0–4	Harland & Wolffs	
	Sholing Athletic	2–1	Cowes	
	Weymouth	0–2	Thornycrofts (Woolston)	
Second qualifying round
	Boscombe	1–0	Thornycrofts (Woolston)	
	Sholing Athletic	1–1	Harland & Wolffs	
Replay	Harland & Wolffs	3–0	Sholing Athletic	
Third qualifying round
	Harland & Wolffs	2–3	Boscombe	

=== Division 23 (Bristol / Gloucestershire / Somerset / Wiltshire) ===
The division comprised 30 teams, of which 28 were drawn into the extra preliminary round to reduce the number to 16 teams required for 8 preliminary round ties.

Torquay United, members of the Western League, progressed from the division to the fourth qualifying round.

Tie	Home team	Score	Away team	Note
Extra preliminary round
	Bristol St George	W–x	Torquay Town (merged with Torquay Utd)	†
	Chippenham Rovers	3–1	Timsbury Athletic	
	Clevedon	1–3	Westbury United	
	Clutton Wanderers	W–x	Douglas (scratched)	†
	Devizes Town	3–1	Cheltenham Town	
	Glastonbury	2–2	Calne & Harris United	
Replay	Calne & Harris United	3–2	Glastonbury	aet
	Horfield United	3–1	Salisbury Corinthians	
	Melksham & Avon United	1–1	Frome Town	
Replay	Frome Town	5–1	Melksham & Avon United	
	Minehead	0–3	Torquay United	
	Peasedown St John	4–1	Street	
	Radstock Town	2–0	Trowbridge Town F.C.	
	Spencer Moulton	3–0	Chippenham Town	
	Warminster Town	1–1	Paulton Rovers	
Replay	Paulton Rovers	2–1	Warminster Town	
	Yeovil & Petters United	5–0	Welton Rovers	
Preliminary round
	Calne & Harris United	1–2	Bristol St George	
	Chippenham Rovers	1–3	Paulton Rovers	
	Devizes Town	0–1	Clandown	
	Hanham Athletic	3–2	Westbury United	
	Radstock Town	1–1	Horfield United	
Replay	Horfield United	1–0	Radstock Town	
	Spencer Moulton	2–1	Peasedown St John	
	Torquay United	1–1	Frome Town	
Replay	Frome Town	1–3	Torquay United	
	Yeovil & Petters United	2–0	Clutton Wanderers	§
First qualifying round
	Clandown	0–1	Bristol St George	
	Hanham Athletic	3–2	Yeovil & Petters United	
	Horfield United	2–1	Paulton Rovers	
	Torquay United	(2–0)	Spencer Moulton	aband.
Restaged	Torquay United	5–2	Spencer Moulton	
Second qualifying round
	Hanham Athletic	2–1	Horfield United	
	Torquay United	6–0	Bristol St George	
Third qualifying round
	Torquay United	2–2	Hanham Athletic	
Replay	Hanham Athletic	1–3	Torquay United	

=== Division 24 (South Wales) ===
The division comprised 32 teams, all of which were drawn into the extra preliminary round.

Mid Rhondda, members of the Welsh League, progressed from the division to the fourth qualifying round.

Tie	Home team	Score	Away team	Note
Extra preliminary round
	Aberaman Athletic	1–2	Pontypridd	
	Aberaman United (scratched)	x–W	Mid Rhondda	†
	Abercarn	0–2	Llanhilleth	
	Bargoed	1–2	Abertillery Town	
	Barry	1–0	Cardiff Corinthians	
	Blackwood Town	1–3	Bridgend Town	
	Caerau Rovers	1–3	Treherbert	
	Caerphilly	0–0	Ebbw Vale	
Replay	Ebbw Vale	2–1	Caerphilly	
	Chepstow Town	6–0	Rhiwderin	§
	Gilfach	10–0	Cross Keys	
	Lovell's Athletic	1–2	Rhymney Town	
	Mardy	3–2	Oakdale United	
	Pembroke Dock	–	Llanelli Town	
Restaged	Pembroke Dock	2–0	Llanelli Town	
	Porth Athletic	2–0	Aberdare Athletic	
	Rogerstone	1–1	Risca Stars	
Replay	Risca Stars	1–4	Rogerstone	
	Ton Pentre	1–0	New Tredegar	
Preliminary round
	Abertillery Town	9–1	Rogerstone	
	Bridgend Town	6–2	Pembroke Dock	
	Chepstow Town	3–1	Barry	
	Ebbw Vale	6–0	Ton Pentre	
	Gilfach	0–4	Porth Athletic	
	Mardy	7–1	Llanhilleth	
	Pontypridd	8–0	Rhymney Town	
	Treherbert	0–1	Mid Rhondda	
First qualifying round
	Bridgend Town	3–1	Chepstow Town	
	Mardy	1–0	Abertillery Town	
	Pontypridd	0–2	Mid Rhondda	
	Porth Athletic	2–0	Ebbw Vale	
Second qualifying round
	Mardy	1–0	Porth Athletic	
	Mid Rhondda	7–1	Bridgend Town	
Third qualifying round
	Mardy	0–0	Mid Rhondda	
Replay	Mid Rhondda	(2–1)	Mardy	void
Replay	played using stand-in match officials			void
Replay	Mardy	0–5	Mid Rhondda	@Cardiff

== Fourth qualifying round ==
There were forty-eight clubs included in the fourth qualifying round draw: the twenty-four teams from the qualifying divisions (identified below by the inclusion of their divisional number) were joined by fourteen non-League clubs who were not part of the earlier qualifying rounds and ten clubs from the Football League Third Division North. The ties were drawn on a regional basis.

From the twenty-four ties seventeen non-League clubs (including ten from the qualifying divisions) and seven Third Division North clubs progressed into the next round.

Key to the leagues in which the clubs competed (as appended to their name):-

- AL – Athenian League
- BL – Birmingham & District League
- CA – Central Alliance
- CCL – Cheshire County League
- D3N – Third Division North
- D3S – Third Division South
- DSL – Derbyshire Senior League
- IL – Isthmian League
- KL – Kent League
- LC – Lancashire Combination
- ML – Midland League
- NA – Northern Alliance
- NEL – North Eastern League
- NL – Northern League
- NoL – Northamptonshire League
- SAL – Southern Amateur League
- ShL – Sheffield Association League
- SL – Southern League
- SpL – Spartan League
- WeL – Welsh League
- WiL – Wiltshire League
- WL – Western League
- YL – Yorkshire League

(Numbers prefaced by Q, where shown, indicate the club's qualifying division)

Tie	Home team	Score	Away team	Note
	Accrington Stanley (D3N)	0–1	Nelson (D3N)	
	Altrincham (Q6) (CCL)	4–4	Tranmere Rovers (D3N)	
Replay	Tranmere Rovers (D3N)	2–4	Altrincham (Q6) (CCL)	
	Ashington (D3N)	6–0	Close Works (Q1) (NA)	§
	Aylesbury United (Q19) (SpL)	0–0	Metrogas (AL)	
Replay	Metrogas (AL)	5–0	Aylesbury United (Q19) (SpL)	
	Barrow (D3N)	2–2	Lancaster Town (Q5) (LC)	
Replay	Lancaster Town (Q5) (LC)	1–0	Barrow (D3N)	
	Bishop Auckland (NL)	2–0	West Stanley (NEL)	
	Blyth Spartans (NEL)	1–2	Shildon Athletic (Q3) (NEL)	
	Cambridge Town (Q16) (SAL)	2–7	Kettering Town (CA)	
	Carlisle United (Q4) (NEL)	0–0	Stalybridge Celtic (D3N)	
Replay	Stalybridge Celtic (D3N)	3–2	Carlisle United (Q4) (NEL)	
	Chesterfield (D3N)	3–0	Irthlingborough Town (Q15) (NoL)	
	Clapton (17) (IL)	2–3	St Albans City (Q18) (AL)	
	Crewe Alexandra (D3N)	1–1	Chester (Q7) (CCL)	
Replay	Chester (Q7) (CCL)	1–2	Crewe Alexandra (D3N)	aet
	Darlaston (Q8) (BL)	3–1	Hednesford (BL)	
	Frickley Colliery (Q10) (ShL)	1–3	Wombwell (Q11) (YL)	
	Gainsborough Trinity (Q9) (ML)	1–2	Mansfield Town (Q13) (ML)	
	Leadgate Park (NEL)	3–1	Esh Winning (Q2) (NL)	
	Leytonstone (IL)	1–2	Ilford (IL)	
	Maidstone United (KL)	1–1	Tufnell Park (IL)	
Replay	Tufnell Park (IL)	1–0	Maidstone United (KL)	aet
	Mid Rhondda (Q24) (WeL)	6–1	Swindon Victoria (WiL)	
	Northfleet United (Q21) (KL)	1–0	Guildford United (Q20) (SL)	
	Shrewsbury Town (BL)	0–1	Walsall (D3N)	
	Torquay United (Q23) (WL)	0–1	Boscombe (Q22) (SL)	
	Worksop Town (ML)	3–1	Staveley Town (Q12) (DSL)	
	Wrexham (D3N)	4–0	Burton All Saints (Q14) (BL)	

== Fifth qualifying round ==
The draw comprised forty-eight teams, the twenty-four victorious teams from the previous round plus five additional non-League teams, nine teams from the Football League Third Division South, eight from the Third Division North and two from the Football League Second Division. In a quirk the draw paired together the two Second Division clubs, Coventry City and Rotherham County, with the former victorious. Ties were on a wider regional basis.

From the twenty-four ties seven non-League clubs (including four from the qualifying divisions), eight clubs each from the Third Division North and Third Division South and one club from the Second Division progressed into the next round.

Tie	Home team	Score	Away team	Note
	Ashington (D3N)	2–1	Leadgate Park (NEL)	
	Bishop Auckland (NL)	1–1	Shildon Athletic (Q3) (NEL)	
Replay	Shildon Athletic (Q3) (NEL)	2–1	Bishop Auckland (NL)	aet
	Brentford (D3S)	3–1	Dulwich Hamlet (IL)	
	Bristol Rovers (D3S)	0–0	Exeter City (D3S)	
Replay	Exeter City (D3S)	0–2	Bristol Rovers (D3S)	
	Durham City (D3N)	0–2	Darlington (D3N)	
	Grimsby Town (D3N)	1–1	Kettering Town (CA)	
Replay	Kettering Town (CA)	0–2	Grimsby Town (D3N)	
	Lancaster Town (Q5) (LC)	2–0	Stockport County (D3N)	
	Lincoln City (D3N)	1–2	Northampton Town (D3S)	
	Mansfield Town (Q13) (ML)	2–0	Darlaston (Q8) (BL)	
	Metrogas (AL)	1–2	Norwich City (D3S)	
	Mid Rhondda (Q24) (WeL)	0–1	Merthyr Town (D3S)	
	Nelson (D3N)	3–2	Rochdale (D3N)	
	Newport County (D3S)	2–0	Bath City (SL)	
	Northfleet United (Q21) (KL)	0–0	Gillingham (D3S)	
Replay	Gillingham (D3S)	3–1	Northfleet United (Q21) (KL)	
	Nunhead (IL)	0–0	St Albans City (Q18) (AL)	
Replay	St Albans City (Q18) (AL)	2–0	Nunhead (IL)	
	Oxford City (IL)	2–0	London Caledonians (IL)	
	Rotherham County (D2)	1–1	Coventry City (D2)	
Replay	Coventry City (D2)	1–0	Rotherham County (D2)	aet
	Southport (D3N)	3–0	Altrincham (Q6) (CCL)	
	Stalybridge Celtic (D3N)	2–0	Hartlepools United (D3N)	
	Swansea Town (D3S)	4–0	Boscombe (Q22) (SL)	
	Tufnell Park (IL)	1–0	Ilford (IL)	
	Walsall (D3N)	2–0	Chesterfield (D3N)	
	Worksop Town (ML)	2–0	Wombwell (Q11) (YL)	
	Wrexham (D3N)	5–0	Crewe Alexandra (D3N)	

== Sixth qualifying round ==
The draw comprised only the twenty-four victorious teams from the previous round who were drawn into twelve ties which were no longer regionally based.

Of the seven non-League clubs who played in the sixth qualifying round only one, Worksop Town of the Midland League, who had entered the competition at the fourth qualifying round, progressed to the first round proper.

Tie	Home team	Score	Away team	Note
	Ashington (D3N)	1–0	Stalybridge Celtic (D3N)	
	Brentford (D3S)	1–0	Shildon Athletic (Q3) (NEL)	
	Gillingham (D3S)	3–1	St Albans City (Q18) (AL)	
	Grimsby Town (D3N)	1–1	Tufnell Park (IL)	
Replay	Tufnell Park (IL)	1–2	Grimsby Town (D3N)	
	Mansfield Town (Q13) (ML)	1–1	Walsall (D3N)	
Replay	Walsall (D3N)	4–0	Mansfield Town (Q13) (ML)	
	Merthyr Town (D3S)	0–0	Darlington (D3N)	
Replay	Darlington (D3N)	1–0	Merthyr Town (D3S)	aet
	Northampton Town (D3S)	1–0	Lancaster Town (Q5) (LC)	
	Oxford City (IL)	1–1	Norwich City (D3S)	
Replay	Norwich City (D3S)	3–0	Oxford City (IL)	
	Southport (D3N)	1–0	Coventry City (D2)	
	Swansea Town (D3S)	2–0	Bristol Rovers (D3S)	
	Worksop Town (ML)	2–1	Nelson (D3N)	
	Wrexham (D3N)	0–0	Newport County (D3S)	
Replay	Newport County (D3S)	3–0	Wrexham (D3N)	

== 1921–22 FA Cup ==
See 1921–22 FA Cup for details of the rounds from the first round proper onwards.
