= Barnsley Association League =

Barnsley Association Football League
- Founded: 1894 (as Barnsley Minor Cup League)
- Folded: 2005
- Country: England

The Barnsley Association League was a football competition for clubs in the Barnsley area of England.

== History ==
It was founded as the Barnsley Minor Cup League in 1894, changing name to the Association League in 1909. The competition folded in 2005.

== Honours ==
Season	
1894–95	Hoyland Town
1995–96	Swinton Town
1896–97	South Kirkby
1897–98	Birdwell reserves
1898–99	West Melton
1899–1900	Royston reserves
1900–01	Darton Rovers
1901–02	South Kirkby
1902–03	Hoyland Town
1903–04	Hoyland Town
1904–05	Wombwell Main
1905–06	Elsecar Athletic
1906–07	Wombwell Main
1907–08	Wombwell Main
1908–09	Hoyland Town
1909–10	Hoyland Town and Monckton Athletic (shared)
1910–11	
1911–12	
1912–13	Darfield United
1913–14	Tankersley
1914–15	Wombwell Main
1915–16	No competition due to WWI
1916–17	No competition due to WWI
1917–18	No competition due to WWI
1918–19	No competition due to WWI
1919–20	Darfield St. George's
1920–21	Prospect United
1921–22	Cudworth Village
1922–23	Monckton Athletic
1923–24	Ardsley Athletic
1924–25	Prospect United
1925–26	Hemsworth West End
1926–27	Hemsworth West End
1927–28	Ardsley Athletic
1928–29	Ardsley Athletic
1929–30	Ardsley Athletic
1930–31	South Hiendley
1931–32	South Hiendley
1932–33	Brampton Road WMC
1933–34	Highstone Road United
1934–35	Wombwell Main
1935–36	Ardsley Athletic
1936–37	Monckton Athletic
1937–38	Darton Welfare
1938–39	Cudworth Village
1939–40	No competition due to WWI
1940–41	No competition due to WWI
1941–42	No competition due to WWI
1942–43	No competition due to WWI
1943–44	Ship Inn Rovers
1944–45	
1945–46	
1946–47	Jump Home Guard
1947–48	Hoyland Common Athletic
1948–49	Hoyland Common Athletic
1949–50	Royston Social
1950–51	Worsbrough Bridge Athletic
1951–52	Winn Street United
1952–53	Worsbrough Bridge Athletic
1953–54	Lundwood WMC
1954–55	Winn Street United
1955–56	Houghton Main Welfare
1956–57	Houghton Main Welfare
1957–58	Yotar Sports
1958–59	Cortonwood Miners Welfare
1959–60	Hoyle Mill United
1960–61	Lundwood WMC
1961–62	Lundwood WMC
1962–63	Swaithe Main Athletic
1963–64	Redfearn Sports
1964–65	Athersley Social WMC
1965–66	Redfearn Sports
1966–67	Redfearn Sports
1967–68	Lundwood WMC
1968–69	Redfearn Sports

Season	Premier Division	Association Division
1969–70	Dodworth Miners Welfare	Barugh Green Sports
1970–71	Ward Green WMC	West Green WMC
1971–72	West Green WMC	
1972–73	West Green WMC	
1973–74	National Reserve	
1974–75	Eldon	
1975–76	Eldon	Darfield WMC
1976–77	Eldon	Lundwood Ex-Servicemen
1977–78	Ward Green WMC	West Green WMC
1978–79	Competition not finished	
1979–80	King George Albion	Mitchells & Darfield
1980–81	King George Albion	Birdwell Rovers
1981–82	Royston Cross	Barrow WMC
1982–83	Redfearn Sports	Kendray WMC
1983–84	Royston Cross	Lundwood Ex-Servicemen
1984–85	Ward Green WMC	High Green Villa
1985–86	Ward Green WMC	Royal Oak
1986–87	Royal Oak	Barrow WMC
1987–88	The Star	Lundwood Ex-Servicemen
1988–89	Wharncliffe Arms	West Green WMC
1989–90	High Green Villa	Lundwood Ex-Servicemen
1990–91	Redfearn Sports	Higham
1991–92	Athersley Recreation	Swaithe Main WMC
1992–93	Athersley Recreation	Grimethorpe Miners Welfare
1993–94	Hare & Hounds	Prospect Tavern
1994–95	Athersley Recreation	Dodworth Miners Welfare
1995–96	Athersley Recreation	Cross Keys
1996–97	Athersley Recreation	Kendray WMC
1997–98	Athersley Recreation reserves	Silkstone Lions
1998–99	Lundwood Lane End	Royston Railway
1999–00	Lundwood Main Street	Cutting Edge
2000–01	Lundwood Main Street	Manor Youth
2001–02	Houghton Main	Elsecar Dynamoes

Season	Premier Division
2002–03	Lundwood Main Street
2003–04	
2004–05	
