= Tommy Crawshaw =

English footballer (1872–1960)

- Tommy Crawshaw aged 22, pictured in his England kit after his first international in 1895

Personal information
- Full name: Thomas Henry Crawshaw
- Date of birth: 27 December 1872
- Place of birth: Sheffield, England
- Date of death: 25 November 1960 (aged 87)
- Place of death: Sheffield, England
- Position: Centre-half

Youth career
- 18??–1891: Park Grange
- 1891–1893: Attercliffe
- 1893–1894: Heywood Central

Senior career*
Years	Team	Apps	(Gls)
1894–1908	Sheffield Wednesday	418	(25)
1908–1909	Chesterfield	25	(0)
1910–1911	Castleford		
Total		443	(25)

International career
1895–1904	England	10	(1)
- * Club domestic league appearances and goals

Thomas Henry Crawshaw (27 December 1872 – 25 November 1960) was a professional footballer who played almost his entire League career with Sheffield Wednesday. Crawshaw was a centre-half whose career lasted from 1894 to 1909 during which time he played a total of 492 games in all competitions, scoring 27 goals. Crawshaw has gone down in the annals of Sheffield Wednesday as one of the key figures in the early history of the club. In the late 19th and early 20th centuries he appeared in The Wednesday side which lifted the FA Cup on two occasions and won the Football League First Division title twice. He is the only Sheffield Wednesday player to win two FA Cup winners medals with the club. He appeared for the England national football team on ten occasions.

== Playing career ==
Tommy was born in Sheffield and was brought up in the Park Hill area of the town along with his brothers Percy and George. Both of his brothers played football with Percy appearing nine times for Wednesday while George played for Worksop Town for many years. Tommy Crawshaw's early football was played with local clubs Park Grange and Attercliffe, in 1893 he moved to play for Heywood Central in the newly formed Manchester Football League and his good form attracted the attention of Sheffield Wednesday. Crawshaw signed for Wednesday on 24 April 1894 as a replacement for the long serving Billy Betts.

=== Sheffield Wednesday ===
Crawshaw made his Wednesday debut on 1 September 1894, the opening day of the 1894–95 season, in a 1–3 away defeat at Everton. He made an immediate impact in the side missing only two matches that season and was called up for the England side before the season was out. In the following campaign Crawshaw was part of the Wednesday side which won the FA Cup, he played in all six ties, scoring in the 3–1 semi-final replay victory over Bolton Wanderers. However he did make an uncharacteristic mistake in the final against Wolves when an error allowed David Black to equalise before Wednesday went on to win 2–1 through two Fred Spiksley goals.

The 1896 publication Famous Footballers described Crawshaw as "A thorough worker always …he plays a good game from first to last and is unselfish to a degree. A good tackler he uses his head cleverly as well." In the 1899–1900 season Crawshaw led Wednesday to promotion from the Second Division in their first season at their new home at Owlerton. Back in the top flight of English football Crawshaw formed an imposing line of defence with Bob Ferrier and Harry Ruddlesdin.

Crawshaw made his England international debut on 9 March 1895 in a 9–0 win over Ireland at the County Ground, Derby. Crawshaw's international career spanned nine years in which time he only made 10 appearances, all these were in the British Home Championship. His England career included a four-year absence from the team between March 1897 and March 1901, although only 10 matches were played in this time. He marked his return to the England team by scoring one of the goals in a 3–0 victory over Ireland on 9 March 1901. This one match return was followed by a three-year break out of the team before returning to play two matches in 1904 with his final appearance being against Ireland in Belfast on 12 March 1904.

When Wednesday lifted back to back First Division championships in 1902–03 and 1903–04 Crawshaw only missed three League matches over the two seasons as captain of the side. By 1905 Crawshaw was 32 years old, however he was still an automatic choice for Wednesday, playing in 71 consecutive matches between March 1905 and December 1906. In 1906–07 he played in all eight FA Cup matches as Wednesday won the cup again, beating Everton 2–1. The cup winning season was his last as a regular member of the side although he did play in 14 League matches in 1907–08 with his final game for the club being on 7 March 1908 in the Steel City derby with Wednesday triumphing 2–0 over United. In April 1908, the 35-year-old Crawshaw was granted a free transfer by Wednesday in recognition of his sterling service for the club.

=== Latter career ===
Several clubs were interested in signing Crawshaw, he eventually opted for Chesterfield, playing 25 League matches in 1908–09 as the team struggled in Division Two and failed to be re-elected at the end of the season. In January 1910 he joined non-League Castleford for a short time before taking a job as Secretary of Glossop until the outbreak of World War I. After the war he opened a newsagents in Bramall Lane, Sheffield. In the 1920s he became the landlord of the Sportsmans Group public house in Owlerton, near to the Wednesday ground. He later took a pub in the centre of Sheffield, running The Yorkshireman's Arms on Burgess Street for many years. Crawshaw died on 25 November 1960, aged 87.
