= Harry Ruddlesdin =

English footballer

Personal information
- Full name: Herod Ruddlesdin
- Date of birth: 9 June 1876
- Place of birth: Birdwell, South Yorkshire, England
- Date of death: 26 March 1910 (aged 33)
- Place of death: Birdwell, South Yorkshire, England
- Position: Wing half

Youth career
- Birdwell

Senior career*
Years	Team	Apps	(Gls)
1898–1907	The Wednesday	259	(7)
1908–1909	Northampton Town		

International career
1904–1905	England	3	(0)
- * Club domestic league appearances and goals

Herod "Harry" Ruddlesdin (9 June 1876 – 26 March 1910) was an English footballer who played most of his career with The Wednesday, helping them claim the Football League Second Division title in 1900, followed by the Football League championship in 1903 and 1904. He also made three appearances for England.

== Career ==
Ruddlesdin was born in Birdwell, South Yorkshire and played part-time football for Birdwell F.C. while working as a collier. He joined The Wednesday in the summer of 1898 and soon slotted well into the half-back line, being able to play equally well on either wing. His first season saw Wednesday relegated to the Second Division, but in 1899–1900 he was ever-present as Wednesday regained their place in the top flight, claiming the Second Division title by two points over Bolton Wanderers.

Back in the First Division, Ruddlesdin formed a settled half-back line alongside Tommy Crawshaw and Bob Ferrier, who between them hardly missed a match over the next four seasons, as Wednesday took the Football League championship in 1903 and again the following season. During the period from 10 September 1898 to 23 March 1901, Ruddlesdin played every match, an unbroken run of 100 games.

Ruddlesdin made his first appearance for England playing alongside Crawshaw in a 2–2 draw with Wales on 29 February 1904. Both Ruddlesdin and Crawshaw retained their places for the next match, against Ireland two weeks later, which ended in a 3–1 victory, with Alf Common scoring twice.

Ruddlesdin's final international appearance came the following year in a 1–1 victory over Scotland. By now, illness was beginning to restrict Ruddlesdin's appearances for Wednesday, and although he made a recovery for 1905–06, his health soon deteriorated and he was forced to retire from the game in December 1906. Although he attempted a comeback, first with Wednesday and then with Northampton Town it "soon became apparent that he was no longer up to the rigours of full time football".

Ruddlesdin died of tuberculosis in his hometown on 26 March 1910.

== Honours ==
The Wednesday

- Football League Second Division Champions - 1900
- Football League First Division Champions - 1903, 1904
