= William Hargreaves (disambiguation) =

William Hargreaves (1880–1941) was a British composer.

William Hargreaves may also refer to:

- William Hargreaves (cricketer) (1872–1948), British cricketer
- William Hargreaves (footballer) (1888–1944), British professional footballer

== See also ==
- John William Hargreaves (1945–1996), Australian actor
- Oliver William Hargreaves Leese (1894–1978), British Army officer
