= Hoyland Common Athletic F.C. =

Hoyland Common Athletic
- Full name: Hoyland Common Athletic Football Club

Hoyland Common Athletic F.C. was an English association football club based in Hoyland, South Yorkshire.

== History ==
Little is known of the club other than that it competed in the FA Cup in the 1940s.

=== League and cup history ===
Hoyland Common Athletic League and Cup history
Season	FA Cup
1948–49	Preliminary round
1949–50	3rd qualifying round

== Records ==
- Best FA Cup performance: 3rd qualifying round, 1949–50
