= Athersley Recreation F.C. =

Association football club in England

Coordinates: 53°35′7.195″N 1°28′25.194″W

Athersley Recreation
- Full name: Athersley Recreation Football Club
- Nicknames: The Penguins, The Rec
- Founded: 1979
- Ground: Sheerien Park, Athersley
- Capacity: 2,000 (150 seated)
- Chairman: Michael Shepherd
- Manager: Rob Landon
- League: Northern Counties East League Division One
- 2025–26: Northern Counties East League Division One, 19th of 22
Home colours

Athersley Recreation Football Club is a football club based in Athersley, Barnsley, South Yorkshire, England. They are currently members of the Northern Counties East League Premier Division and play at Sheerien Park.

== History ==
The club was formed in 1979 as Athersley North Juniors. In 1983–84 they finished third in Division Two of the Barnsley Nelson League and were promoted to Division One. After finishing as runners-up in Division One the following season, they switched to Division Two of the Barnsley Junior League for the 1985–86 season. Their first season in the new division saw them finish third, earning promotion to Division One. They were renamed Athersley Recreation in the summer of 1986.

After winning Division One in 1986–87, Athersley became members of Division One of the Barnsley Association League. They finished as runners-up in the following season, earning promotion to the Premier Division. The club went on to win back-to-back Premier Division titles in 1991–92 and 1992–93, and then three successive titles between 1995 and 1997. After their third title in 1996–97, the club moved up to Division Two of the Sheffield & Hallamshire County Senior League in 1997. They won the division in their first season in the league, earning promotion to Division One. The following season saw them finish as runners-up in Division One, resulting in promotion to the Premier Division. They subsequently won the Premier Division at the first attempt.

Athersley won the Premier Division again in 2003–04, starting a period of success that saw them win the title four times in the next eight seasons, finishing as runners-up on the other four occasions. After winning their sixth Premier Division title in 2011–12, the club was promoted to Division One of the Northern Counties East League. Their first season in the new league saw them finish as runners-up, earning promotion to the Premier Division. In 2013–14 they entered the FA Vase for the first time, and a year later they made their FA Cup debut.

In May 2014 they won the Sheffield & Hallamshire Senior Cup for the first time, beating Frickley Athletic in the final at Hillsborough. In 2021–22 they finished bottom of the Premier Division, resulting in relegation to Division One. They finished bottom of Division One the following season, but were not relegated.

=== Season-by-season record ===
Season	Division	Level	Position	FA Cup	FA Vase	Notes
1983–84	Barnsley Nelson League Division Two	–	3/10	–	–	Promoted
1984–85	Barnsley Nelson League Division One	–	2/11	–	–	Promoted
1985–86	Barnsley Junior League Division Two	–	3/10	–	–	Promoted
1986–87	Barnsley Junior League Division One	–	1/13	–	–	League champions, promoted
1987–88	Barnsley Association League Division One	–	2/12	–	–	Promoted
1988–89	Barnsley Association League Premier Division	–	5/11	–	–	
1989–90	Barnsley Association League Premier Division	–	5/11	–	–	
1990–91	Barnsley Association League Premier Division	–	3/11	–	–	
1991–92	Barnsley Association League Premier Division	–	1/12	–	–	League champions
1992–93	Barnsley Association League Premier Division	–	1/12	–	–	League champions
1993–94	Barnsley Association League Premier Division	–	3/8	–	–	
1994–95	Barnsley Association League Premier Division	–	1/9	–	–	League champions
1995–96	Barnsley Association League Premier Division	–	1/9	–	–	League champions
1996–97	Barnsley Association League Premier Division	–	1/7	–	–	League champions
1997–98	Sheffield & Hallamshire County Senior League Division Two	–	1/15	–	–	League champions, promoted
1998–99	Sheffield & Hallamshire County Senior League Division One	–	2/14	–	–	Promoted
1999–00	Sheffield & Hallamshire County Senior League Premier Division	–	1/14	–	–	League champions
2000–01	Sheffield & Hallamshire County Senior League Premier Division	–	8/14	–	–	
2001–02	Sheffield & Hallamshire County Senior League Premier Division	–	2/14	–	–	
2002–03	Sheffield & Hallamshire County Senior League Premier Division	–	4/13	–	–	
2003–04	Sheffield & Hallamshire County Senior League Premier Division	–	1/14	–	–	League champions
2004–05	Sheffield & Hallamshire County Senior League Premier Division	11	1/14	–	–	League champions
2005–06	Sheffield & Hallamshire County Senior League Premier Division	11	2/14	–	–	
2006–07	Sheffield & Hallamshire County Senior League Premier Division	11	1/14	–	–	League champions
2007–08	Sheffield & Hallamshire County Senior League Premier Division	11	2/13	–	–	
2008–09	Sheffield & Hallamshire County Senior League Premier Division	11	1/13	–	–	League champions
2009–10	Sheffield & Hallamshire County Senior League Premier Division	11	2/12	–	–	
2010–11	Sheffield & Hallamshire County Senior League Premier Division	11	2/14	–	–	
2011–12	Sheffield & Hallamshire County Senior League Premier Division	11	1/14	–	–	League champions, promoted
2012–13	Northern Counties East League Division One	10	2/22	–	–	Promoted
2013–14	Northern Counties East League Premier Division	9	10/23	–	2R	
2014–15	Northern Counties East League Premier Division	9	13/21	PR	2QR	
2015–16	Northern Counties East League Premier Division	9	18/22	EPR	2QR	
2016–17	Northern Counties East League Premier Division	9	10/22	EPR	1QR	
2017–18	Northern Counties East League Premier Division	9	17/22	EPR	1QR	
2018–19	Northern Counties East League Premier Division	9	17/20	EPR	1QR	
2019–20	Northern Counties East League Premier Division	9	–	EPR	1QR	Season abandoned due to COVID-19 pandemic
2020–21	Northern Counties East League Premier Division	9	–	EPR	1QR	Season abandoned due to COVID-19 pandemic
2021–22	Northern Counties East League Premier Division	9	20/20	EPR	1QR	Relegated
2022–23	Northern Counties East League Division One	10	20/20	–	2QR	
2023–24	Northern Counties East League Division One	10	18/23	–	2QR	
2024–25	Northern Counties East League Division One	10	18/22	–	1QR	
2025–26	Northern Counties East League Division One	10	19/22	–	2QR	
Season	Division	Level	Position	FA Cup	FA Vase	Notes
Source: Football Club History Database

== Ground ==
The club plays at Sheerien Park on Ollerton Road in Athersley. It has a capacity of 2,000, of which 420 is covered and 150 seated.

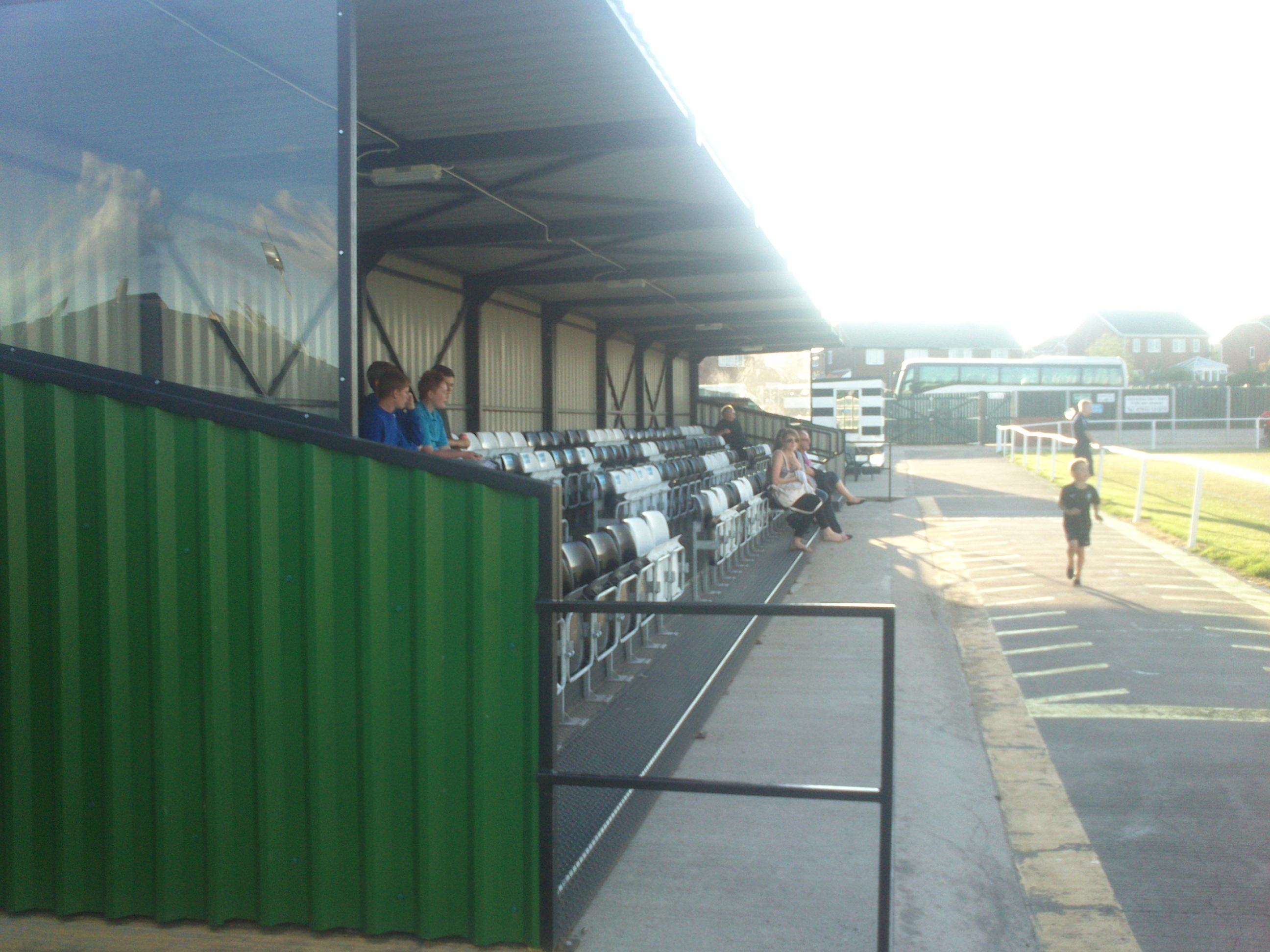

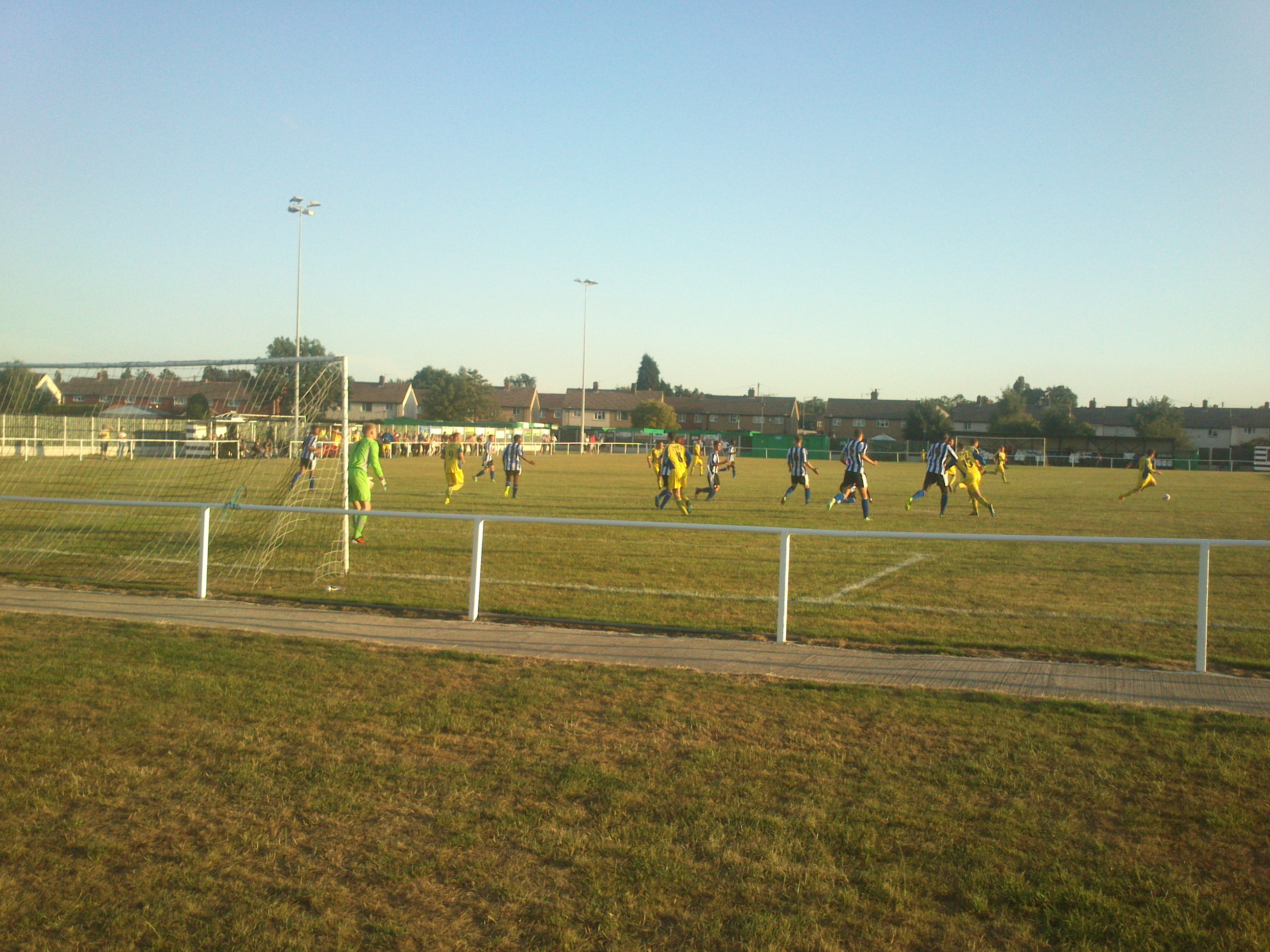

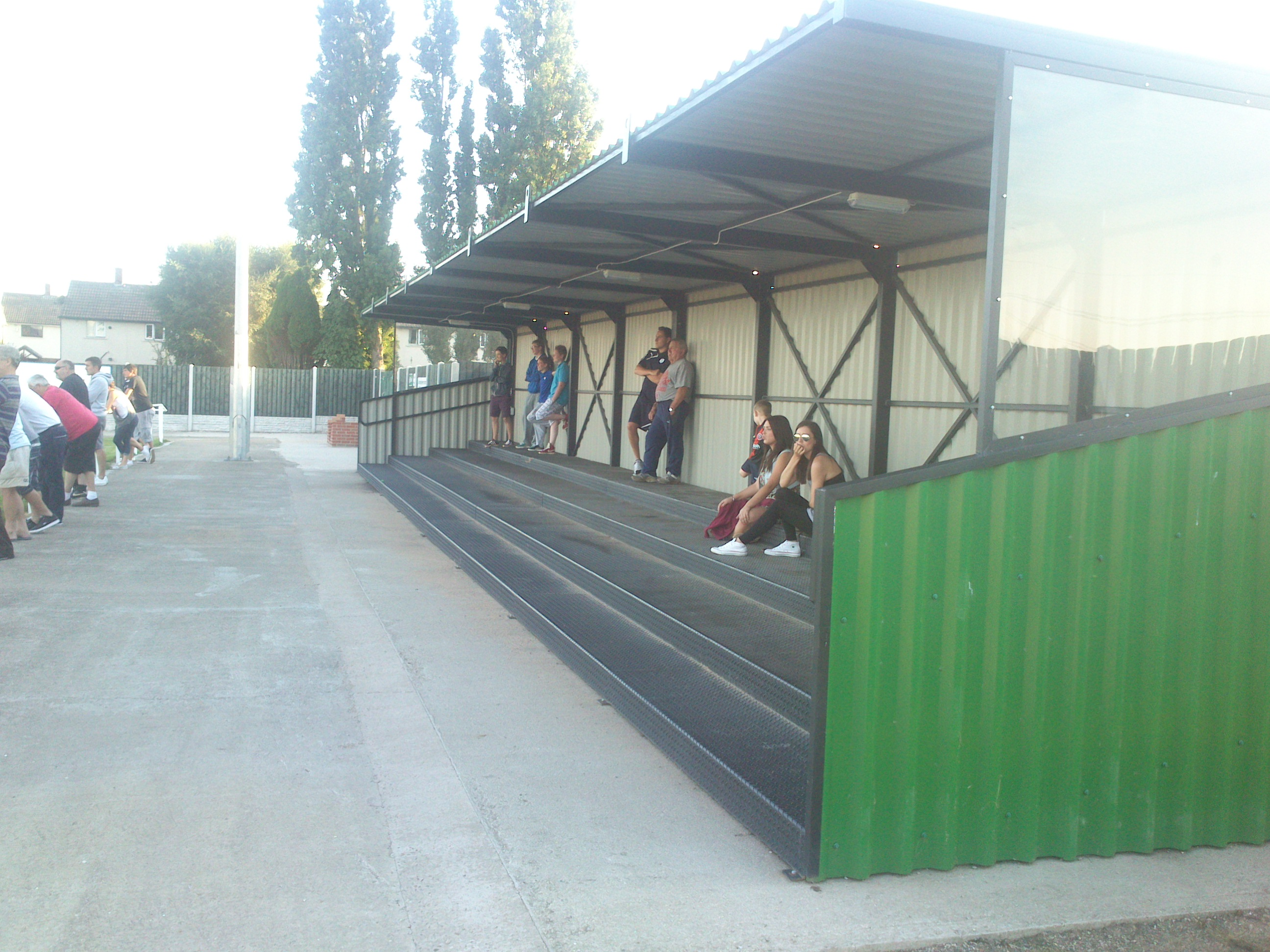

== Honours ==
- Sheffield & Hallamshire County Senior League
  - Premier Division champions 1999–2000, 2003–04, 2004–05, 2006–07, 2008–09, 2011–12
  - Division Two champions 1997–98
  - League Cup winners 1997–98, 2005–06, 2008–09
- Barnsley Association League
  - Champions 1991–92, 1992–93, 1994–95, 1995–96, 1996–97
- Barnsley Junior League
  - Champions 1986–87
- Sheffield & Hallamshire Senior Cup
  - Winners 2013–14
- Sheffield & Hallamshire Association Cup
  - Winners 2007–08

== Records ==
- Best FA Cup performance: Preliminary round, 2014–15
- Best FA Vase performance: Second round, 2013–14

== See also ==
- Athersley Recreation F.C. players
- Athersley Recreation F.C. managers
