= Wombwell Main F.C. =

Association football club in England

Coordinates: 53.51925°N 1.4152°W

Wombwell Main
- Full name: Wombwell Main Football Club
- Ground: Hough Lane, Wombwell
- Manager: Terry Simon
- League: Sheffield & Hallamshire County Senior League Premier Division
- 2024–25: Sheffield & Hallamshire County Senior League Premier Division, 4th of 14
Home colours

Wombwell Main Football Club is a football club based in Wombwell, Barnsley, South Yorkshire, England. They are currently members of the Sheffield & Hallamshire County Senior League Premier Division and play at Hough Lane.

== History ==
Little is known of the formation of the club – they first came to prominence when entering the FA Cup in 1906. They have entered the FA Cup on a total of 10 occasions. They entered the Sheffield & Hallamshire County Senior League (S&HCSL) in 1996, and by 1998 they had won two successive promotions to reach the S&HCSL's Premier Division.

In their first Premier Division campaign they claimed the league championship – an achievement they would repeat on a further three occasions. They have also won the S&HCSL's League Cup three times, the first two in 2002 and 2008 giving the club a league and cup double.

The Main suffered a turbulent time during the mid-2010s, culminating in relegation to Division One of the County Senior League, though promotion was gained at the first attempt.

They have won the Mexborough Montagu Hospital Cup 7 times and are the 2nd most successful side in the competition's history.

=== Season-by-season record ===
| Season | Division | Level | Position | FA Cup | Notes |
|---|---|---|---|---|---|
| 1903–04 | Barnsley Minor Cup League | - | 5th/9 | - | |
| 1904–05 | Barnsley Minor Cup League | - | 1st/12 | - | League champions (won play-off) |
| 1905–06 | Barnsley Minor Cup League | - | 7th/11 | - | |
| 1906–07 | Barnsley Minor Cup League | - | | 1QR | League champions (won play-off) |
| 1907–08 | Barnsley Minor Cup League | - | 3rd/11 | PR | League champions (won play-off) |
| 1908–09 | Barnsley Minor Cup League | - | 1st/10 | 2QR | Lost league play-off |
| 1909–10 | Barnsley Association League | - | 5th/9 | PR | |
Club dissolved (1910) and reformed (1913)
| 1913–14 | Barnsley Association League | - | | - | |
| 1914–15 | Barnsley Association League | - | 2nd/5 | - | League champions (won play-off) |
| 1915–16 | Club did not enter any competitions due to World War I | | | | |
| 1916–17 | Club did not enter any competitions due to World War I | | | | |
| 1917–18 | Club did not enter any competitions due to World War I | | | | |
| 1918–19 | Club did not enter any competitions due to World War I | | | | |
| 1919–20 | Barnsley Association League | - | | - | |
| 1920–21 | Barnsley Junior League | - | 5th/9 | PR | |
| 1921–22 | Barnsley Junior League | - | 1st/10 | EPR | |
Club dissolved (1922) and reformed (1929)
| 1929–30 | Barnsley Nelson League | - | 3rd/10 | - | |
| 1930–31 | Barnsley Nelson League | - | 3rd/15 | - | |
| 1931–32 | Barnsley Junior League | - | 4th/13 | - | |
| 1932–33 | Barnsley Junior League | - | 2nd/13 | - | |
| 1933–34 | Barnsley Association League | - | 4th/10 | PR | |
| 1934–35 | Barnsley Association League | - | 2nd/8 | EPR | League champions (won play-off) |
| 1935–36 | Barnsley Association League | - | | EPR | |
| 1936–37 | Barnsley Association League | - | Withdrew | - | |
| 1937–38 | Barnsley Nelson League | - | 6th/12 | - | |
| 1938–39 | Barnsley Nelson League | - | 2nd/9 | - | |
| 1939–40 | Barnsley Nelson League | - | | - | |
| 1940–41 | Club did not enter any competitions due to World War II | | | | |
| 1941–42 | Club did not enter any competitions due to World War II | | | | |
| 1942–43 | Club did not enter any competitions due to World War II | | | | |
| 1943–44 | Club did not enter any competitions due to World War II | | | | |
| 1944–45 | Barnsley Nelson League | - | 6th/9 | - | |
| 1945–46 | Barnsley Nelson League | - | 3rd/12 | - | |
| 1946–47 | Barnsley Association League | - | | PR | |
| 1947–48 | Barnsley Association League | - | 6th/11 | - | |
| 1948–49 | Barnsley Association League | - | | - | |
| 1949–50 | Barnsley Association League | - | | - | |
Club dissolved (1950) and reformed (1952)
| 1952–53 | Barnsley Nelson League Associate Division | - | | - | |
| 1953–54 | Barnsley Nelson League Associate Division | - | 2nd/10 | - | |
| 1954–55 | Barnsley Nelson League Associate Division | - | 1st/10 | - | Lost league play-off |
| 1955–56 | Barnsley Nelson League Associate Division | - | 1st/10 | - | Lost league play-off |
| 1956–57 | Barnsley Nelson League Associate Division | - | 3rd/11 | - | |
Club dissolved (1957) and reformed (1960)
| 1960–61 | Barnsley Nelson League Associate Division | - | 6th/11 | - | |
| 1961–62 | Barnsley Nelson League Associate Division | - | 5th/14 | - | |
| 1962–63 | Barnsley Junior League | - | | - | |
| 1963–64 | Barnsley Junior League | - | 4th/12 | - | |
| 1964–65 | Barnsley Junior League | - | 1st/11 | - | |
| 1965–66 | Barnsley Association League | - | 8th/11 | - | |
| 1966–67 | Barnsley Association League | - | | - | |
| 1967–68 | Barnsley Association League | - | | - | |
| 1968–69 | Barnsley Junior League | - | 8th/9 | - | |
Club dissolved (1969) and reformed (1970)
| 1970–71 | Barnsley Nelson League Associate Division | - | | - | |
| 1971–72 | Barnsley Nelson League Associate Division | - | | - | |
| 1972–73 | Barnsley Nelson League Division Two | - | | - | Promoted |
| 1973–74 | Barnsley Nelson League Division One | - | 1st/11 | - | League champions |
| 1974–75 | Doncaster & District Senior League Division Three | - | | - | |
| 1975–76 | Hatchard League Division Two | - | 4th/15 | - | Promoted |
| 1976–77 | Hatchard League Division One | - | | - | |
| 1977–78 | Barnsley Nelson League Division Three | - | 1st/14 | - | League champions, promoted |
| 1978–79 | Barnsley Nelson League Division Two | - | | - | |
| 1979–80 | Barnsley Nelson League Division Two | - | 1st/10 | - | League champions, promoted |
| 1980–81 | Barnsley Nelson League Division One | - | 3rd/9 | - | |
| 1981–82 | Barnsley Junior League Division Two | - | 1st/11 | - | League champions, promoted |
| 1982–83 | Barnsley Junior League Division One | - | 2nd/12 | - | |
Club dissolved (1983) and reformed (1987)
| 1987–88 | Barnsley Association League Division One | - | 11th/12 | - | |
| 1988–89 | Barnsley Association League Division One | - | 8th/11 | - | |
| 1989–90 | Barnsley Association League Division One | - | 3rd/10 | - | Promoted |
| 1990–91 | Barnsley Association League Premier Division | - | 7th/11 | - | |
| 1991–92 | Barnsley Association League Premier Division | - | 3rd/12 | - | |
| 1992–93 | Barnsley Association League Premier Division | - | 3rd/12 | - | |
| 1993–94 | Barnsley Association League Premier Division | - | 2nd/8 | - | |
| 1994–95 | Barnsley Association League Premier Division | - | 4th/9 | - | |
| 1995–96 | Barnsley Association League Premier Division | - | 4th/9 | - | |
| 1996–97 | Sheffield & Hallamshire County Senior League Division Two | - | 1st/15 | - | League champions, promoted |
| 1997–98 | Sheffield & Hallamshire County Senior League Division One | - | 2nd/13 | - | Promoted |
| 1998–99 | Sheffield & Hallamshire County Senior League Premier Division | - | 1st/14 | - | League champions |
| 1999–00 | Sheffield & Hallamshire County Senior League Premier Division | - | 5th/14 | - | |
| 2000–01 | Sheffield & Hallamshire County Senior League Premier Division | - | 3rd/14 | - | |
| 2001–02 | Sheffield & Hallamshire County Senior League Premier Division | - | 1st/14 | - | League champions |
| 2002–03 | Sheffield & Hallamshire County Senior League Premier Division | - | 1st/14 | - | League champions |
| 2003–04 | Sheffield & Hallamshire County Senior League Premier Division | - | 4th/14 | - | |
| 2004–05 | Sheffield & Hallamshire County Senior League Premier Division | 11 | 11th/14 | - | |
| 2005–06 | Sheffield & Hallamshire County Senior League Premier Division | 11 | 8th/14 | - | |
| 2006–07 | Sheffield & Hallamshire County Senior League Premier Division | 11 | 3rd/14 | - | |
| 2007–08 | Sheffield & Hallamshire County Senior League Premier Division | 11 | 1st/13 | - | League champions |
| 2008–09 | Sheffield & Hallamshire County Senior League Premier Division | 11 | 2nd/13 | - | |
| 2009–10 | Sheffield & Hallamshire County Senior League Premier Division | 11 | 6th/12 | - | |
| 2010–11 | Sheffield & Hallamshire County Senior League Premier Division | 11 | 11th/14 | - | |
| 2011–12 | Sheffield & Hallamshire County Senior League Premier Division | 11 | 7th/14 | - | |
| 2012–13 | Sheffield & Hallamshire County Senior League Premier Division | 11 | 9th/15 | - | |
| 2013–14 | Sheffield & Hallamshire County Senior League Premier Division | 11 | 10th/14 | - | |
| 2014–15 | Sheffield & Hallamshire County Senior League Premier Division | 11 | 11th/13 | - | Relegated |
| 2015–16 | Sheffield & Hallamshire County Senior League Division One | 12 | 2nd/13 | - | Promoted |
| 2016–17 | Sheffield & Hallamshire County Senior League Premier Division | 11 | 10th/14 | - | |
| 2017–18 | Sheffield & Hallamshire County Senior League Premier Division | 11 | 10th/15 | - | |
| 2018–19 | Sheffield & Hallamshire County Senior League Premier Division | 11 | 7th/15 | - | |
| 2019–20 | Sheffield & Hallamshire County Senior League Premier Division | 11 | - | | Season abandoned owing to COVID-19 pandemic |
| 2020–21 | Sheffield & Hallamshire County Senior League Premier Division | 11 | - | | Season abandoned owing to COVID-19 pandemic |
| 2021–22 | Sheffield & Hallamshire County Senior League Premier Division | 11 | 6th/14 | - | |
| 2022–23 | Sheffield & Hallamshire County Senior League Premier Division | 11 | 2nd/14 | - | |
| 2023–24 | Sheffield & Hallamshire County Senior League Premier Division | 11 | 9th/14 | - | |
| 2024–25 | Sheffield & Hallamshire County Senior League Premier Division | 11 | 4th/14 | - | |
| Season | Division | Level | Position | FA Cup | Notes |
Source: Football Club History Database

== Ground ==
The club plays on Hough Lane, Wombwell, sharing the same ground with the local cricket club.

== Honours ==
=== League ===
- Sheffield & Hallamshire County Senior League Premier Division
  - Champions: 1998/99, 2000/01, 2001/02, 2007/08
- Sheffield & Hallamshire County Senior League Division 1
  - Promoted: 1997/98
- Sheffield & Hallamshire County Senior League Division 2
  - Promoted: 1996/97 (champions)

=== Cup ===
- Mexborough Montagu Hospital Cup
  - Winners 1905/06, 1997/98, 2000/01, 2001/02, 2002/03, 2006/07, 2008/09
  - Runners Up 2009/10, 2017/18, 2018/19
- Rotherham Charity Cup
  - Winners 1905/06, 1906/07
  - Runners Up 2017/18, 2024/25
- Sheffield & Hallamshire County Senior League Cup
  - Winners: 2001/02, 2007/08, 2012/13, 2024/25

== Records ==
- Best FA Cup performance: 2nd qualifying round, 1908–09
