= Swinton Town F.C. =

Swinton Town
- Full name: Swinton Town Football Club

Swinton Town F.C. was an English association football club based in Swinton, South Yorkshire.

== History ==
The club was formed in the 19th century, and won both the Barnsley Minor Cup League and Sheffield Alliance championships before entering the FA Cup in 1898.

== Honours ==
- Sheffield Alliance
  - Champions - 1896/97
- Barnsley Minor Cup League
  - Champions - 1895/96

== Records ==
- Best FA Cup performance: 1st Qualifying Round, 1898–99
