= Hoyland Town F.C. =

Hoyland Town
- Full name: Hoyland Town Football Club

Hoyland Town F.C. was an English association football club based in Hoyland, Barnsley, South Yorkshire.

== History ==
The club was formed in the 19th century, and entered the FA Cup on numerous occasions before folding during the First World War.

== Honours ==
- Barnsley Association League
  - Champions - 1894–95, 1902–03, 1903–04, 1908–09, 1909–10 (shared)

== Records ==
- Best FA Cup performance: 3rd Qualifying Round, 1906–07, 1910–11
