= William Hargreaves (footballer) =

English footballer

Personal information
- Full name: William Vesey Hargreaves
- Date of birth: 1888
- Place of birth: Wombwell, England
- Date of death: 1944 (aged 55–56)
- Position: Wing half

Senior career*
Years	Team	Apps	(Gls)
1907–1908	Darfield United		
1908–1910	Grimsby Town	18	(1)
1910–191?	Mexborough Town		
- * Club domestic league appearances and goals

William Vesey Hargreaves (1888–1944) was an English professional footballer who played as a wing half.
