= Irthlingborough Town F.C. =

English football club

Irthlingborough Town F.C. was an English association football club which participated in the United Counties League and the FA Cup.
