= Darfield United F.C. =

Darfield United
- Full name: Darfield United Football Club

Darfield United F.C. was an English association football club based in Darfield, Barnsley, South Yorkshire.

== History ==
The club was formed early in the 20th century, and remained in existence for just over a decade, during which time they won the Barnsley Association League and entered the FA Cup.

== Honours ==
- Barnsley Association League
  - Champions (1): 1912–13

== Records ==
- Best FA Cup performance: 3rd Qualifying Round, 1912–13
