= Hanham Athletic F.C. =

Association football club in England

Hanham Athletic
- Full name: Hanham Athletic Football Club
- Nickname: The Miners
- Founded: 1896
- Ground: Vicarage Road
- Chairman: Chris Strawford
- Manager: Jamie Johnson and Harman Boyce
- Coach: Gerry Sayers
- League: Gloucestershire County League
- 2024–25: Gloucestershire County League, 13th of 16

Hanham Athletic Football Club is a football club based in England that play in the Gloucestershire County League Premier Division. They played in the FA Cup in the 1940s and 1950s, as well as the FA Vase during the 1970s. They currently play in the Gloucestershire County League.

== Records ==
- FA Cup
  - Second qualifying round 1948–49
- FA Vase
  - Second round 1975–76
