= 1948–49 FA Cup qualifying rounds =

Tournament details
- Country: England; Wales

The FA Cup 1948–49 is the 68th season of the world's oldest football knockout competition; The Football Association Challenge Cup, or FA Cup for short. The large number of clubs entering the tournament from lower down the English football league system meant that the competition started with a number of preliminary and qualifying rounds. The 25 victorious teams from the fourth round qualifying progressed to the first round proper.

== Extra preliminary round ==
=== Ties ===
Tie	Home team	Score	Away team
1	Abingdon Town	4–3	St Frideswides
2	Acton Town	1–8	Wingate
3	Appleby Frodingham	2–4	Laceby
4	Arlesey Town	5–2	Bedford Avenue
5	Armthorpe Welfare	2–5	South Kirkby Colliery
6	Ashford	2–0	Woolwich Polytechnic
7	Ashton United	3–0	Mossley
8	Aylesbury United	4–1	Pressed Steel
9	Bangor City	8–1	Orrell
10	Barnton	5–1	Nantwich
11	Basingstoke Town	1–2	Bitterne Nomads
12	Bentley Colliery	3–1	Upton Colliery
13	Berkhamsted Town	3–1	Rickmansworth Town
14	Botley	1–3	Winchester City
15	Bourneville Athletic	2–3	Hednesford Town
16	Bradford United	4–2	Harrogate Hotspurs
17	Brentwood & Warley	8–0	Hoffman Athletic (Chelmsford)
18	Brigg Town	3–2	Winterton Rangers
19	Brightlingsea United	1–3	Harwich & Parkeston
20	Bristol Aeroplane Company	0–4	Hoffman Athletic (Stonehouse)
21	Callender Athletic	6–0	Aylesford Paper Mills
22	Calne & Harris United	1–3	Peasedown Miners Welfare
23	Chatham Town	2–3	Dover
24	Chesham United	6–2	Hemel Hempstead
25	Chippenham United	6–1	Radstock Town
26	Clacton Town	1–0	Briggs Sports
27	Clapton	0–1	Chingford Town
28	Clevedon w/o-scr Wells Amateurs		
29	Cobham	2–2	Post Office Telecoms
30	Cradley Heath	4–1	Brierley Hill Alliance
31	Cramlington Welfare	3–4	Hexham Hearts
32	Creswell Colliery w/o-scr Hardwick Colliery		
33	Crook Colliery Welfare	0–3	Horden Colliery Welfare
34	Dagenham British Legion	3–2	Colchester Casuals
35	David Brown Athletic	0–11	Ossett Town
36	Dawdon Colliery Welfare	4–1	Cockfield
37	Devizes Town	2–1	Melksham
38	Dorchester Town	3–2	Hamworthy
39	Earlestown	5–1	U G B St Helens
40	East Cowes Victoria	6–1	Sandown
41	Edmonton Borough	0–2	Finchley
42	Eldon Albions	0–5	South Hetton Colliery Welfare
43	Ellesmere Port Town	0–2	Northwich Victoria
44	Enfield	8–0	Civil Service
45	Epsom	4–0	Dorking
46	Eton Manor	5–0	London Transport
47	Farsley Celtic	6–0	Liversedge
48	Frickley Colliery	4–3	Brodsworth Main Colliery
49	Frome Town	2–0	Paulton Rovers
50	Gloucester City	4–0	Cinderford Town
51	Hanham Athletic	2–0	Bristol St George
52	Harlow Town	1–4	Bishop's Stortford
53	Harrowby	2–11	Glossop
54	Headington United	4–2	Osberton Radiator
55	Heanor Athletic	0–1	Linby Colliery
56	Hessle Old Boys	2–3	Meltham Mills
57	Hoyland Common Athletic	5–1	Staveley Welfare
58	Ilminster Town	1–5	Bideford
59	Jarrow	2–1	Morpeth Town
60	Langley Park Colliery Welfare	3–4	Eppleton Colliery Welfare
61	Lostock Gralam	4–0	Wheelock Albion
62	Lye Town	2–5	Boldmere St Michaels
63	Lynemouth Welfare	1–2	Shilbottle Colliery Welfare
64	Lyons Club	3–1	Wood Green Town
65	Macclesfield	6–3	Shell
66	Maltby Main Colliery	1–3	Beighton Miners Welfare
67	Margate	3–1	Canterbury City
68	Marlow	2–3	Slough Centre
69	Mclaren Sports	2–4	Farnham Town
70	Metal & Produce Recovery	1–3	Wallingford Town
71	Murton Colliery Welfare	6–2	Shildon
72	N A C Athletic	2–3	Huntley & Palmers
73	New Waltham	3–1	Luddington
74	Oxford City	9–1	Henley Town
75	Pinner	0–7	Hoddesdon Town
76	Pirelli General Cables	2–5	Romsey Town
77	Polytechnic	1–0	Ware
78	Portland United	2–4	Longfleet St Mary's
79	R A O C Hilsea	3–0	Lymington
80	Romford	5–0	Ford Sports (Dagenham)
81	Rufford Colliery	0–2	Raleigh Athletic
82	Ruislip Manor	6–2	Tufnell Park
83	Ruislip Town	2–4	Stevenage Town
84	Salisbury	1–0	Purton
85	Shankhouse	4–1	Alnwick Town
86	Shotton Colliery Welfare	1–4	Seaham Colliery Welfare
87	Silksworth Colliery Welfare	4–3	Willington
88	Slough Town	2–1	Hayes
89	Somerton Amateurs	0–4	Coleford Athletic
90	Soundwell	9–3	Stonehouse
91	Southall	3–1	Windsor & Eton
92	Spencer Moulton	10–3	West End Rovers
93	Spennymoor United	3–0	Blackhall Colliery Welfare
94	St Albans City	5–0	De Havilland Vampires
95	St Helens Town	4–2	Prescot B I
96	St Neots St Marys	0–4	Baldock Town
97	Stanley United	3–3	Consett
98	Steel Peech & Tozer S S	4–2	Bolsover Colliery
99	Sutton Town (Birmingham)	1–0	Lockheed Leamington
100	Swindon G W R Corinthians	6–3	Wootton Bassett Town
101	Tavistock	7–2	Taunton
102	Thorne Colliery	2–0	Barton Town
103	Thynnes Athletic w/o-scr Staffs Casuals		
104	Tilbury	2–0	Rainham Town
105	Tiverton Town	2–3	Barnstaple Town
106	Tonbridge	5–0	Bexley
107	Tow Law Town	7–2	Seaham United
108	Upminster	2–2	Sawbridgeworth
109	Uxbridge	1–1	Yiewsley
110	Vickers Armstrong	1–4	Leatherhead
111	Welton Rovers	5–1	Odd Down
112	Welwyn Garden City	0–3	Hendon
113	Weymouth	8–3	Bournemouth
114	Willesden	8–1	Chipperfield
115	Wolverton Town	1–5	Luton Amateur
116	Woodford Town	6–1	Saffron Walden Town

=== Replays ===
Tie	Home team	Score	Away team
29	Post Office Telecoms	1–6	Cobham
97	Consett	2–1	Stanley United (Declared void)
108	Sawbridgeworth	1–2	Upminster
109	Yiewsley	3–3	Uxbridge

=== 2nd replay ===
Tie	Home team	Score	Away team
97	Stanley United	3–2	Consett
109	Yiewsley	0–3	Uxbridge

== Preliminary round ==
=== Ties ===
Tie	Home team	Score	Away team
1	Abbey United	1–1	Wisbech Town
2	Abingdon Town	2–2	Wallingford Town
3	Altrincham	0–4	Witton Albion
4	Amble	0–4	Blyth Spartans
5	Annfield Plain	2–1	Gosforth & Coxlodge
6	Appleby	3–6	Florence & Ullcoats United
7	Ashington	1–0	West Stanley
8	Atherton Collieries	4–1	Lytham
9	Bangor City	6–0	Crossens
10	Barking	4–0	Dagenham British Legion
11	Barnton w/o-scr Fodens Motor Works		
12	Basford United	0–3	Ollerton Colliery
13	Bedford Queens Works	1–2	Stewartby Works
14	Bedford Town	7–0	Kempston Rovers
15	Bentley Colliery	1–3	South Kirkby Colliery
16	Berkhamsted Town	3–1	Slough Town
17	Bideford	6–0	Oak Villa
18	Biggleswade & District	3–1	Eynesbury Rovers
19	Billingham St John's	4–5	Cargo Fleet Works
20	Billingham Synthonia	5–1	Guisborough
21	Boots Athletic	0–6	Ransome & Marles
22	Bourne Town	0–5	Raleigh Athletic
23	Bradford United	8–4	New Waltham
24	Brentwood & Warley	2–1	Eton Manor
25	Bridlington Central United	4–1	Whitby
26	Bromley	2–1	Folkestone
27	Bromsgrove Rovers	5–0	Oswestry Town
28	Burscough	4–1	Marine
29	Callender Athletic	1–2	Dartford
30	Chesham United	1–4	Maidenhead United
31	Chichester City	3–5	Bexhill Town
32	Chippenham United	1–2	Trowbridge Town
33	Clitheroe	5–2	Great Harwood
34	Cockermouth	6–3	Moresby Welfare
35	Coleford Athletic	1–4	Clandown
36	Cowes	1–2	East Cowes Victoria
37	Creswell Colliery	2–0	Sheffield
38	Crittall Athletic	2–2	Upminster
39	Darlaston	2–1	Moor Green
40	Dartmouth United	1–3	Clevedon
41	Darwen	2–0	Barnoldswick & District
42	Dawdon Colliery Welfare	1–3	Spennymoor United
43	De Havilland (Bolton)	0–1	Nelson
44	Denaby United	1–0	Kilnhurst Colliery
45	Devizes Town	3–0	Salisbury Corinthians
46	Dinnington Athletic	5–1	Beighton Miners Welfare
47	Dorchester Town	0–2	Ryde Sports
48	Dover	4–2	Tonbridge
49	Earle	1–2	St Helens Town
50	Easington Colliery Welfare	6–1	Eppleton Colliery Welfare
51	Edgware Town	0–0	Finchley
52	Epsom	2–2	Sutton United
53	Evenwood Town	3–2	Chilton Athletic
54	Farnham Town	2–4	Hounslow Town
55	Farsley Celtic	2–1	Thorne Colliery
56	Filey Town	3–1	Whitby Albion Rangers
57	Formby	4–1	Haydock C & B Recreation
58	Frickley Colliery	4–0	Lysaghts Sports
59	Frome Town	3–7	Peasedown Miners Welfare
60	Gloucester City	5–2	Barnstaple Town
61	Goole Town	6–3	Brigg Town
62	Gorleston	5–3	Whitton United
63	Gosport Borough Athletic	0–1	Bournemouth Gasworks Athletic
64	Grantham	3–1	Gedling Colliery
65	Gravesend & Northfleet	3–1	Sittingbourne
66	Halesowen Town	2–0	Cradley Heath
67	Hanham Athletic	3–1	Hoffman Athletic (Stonehouse)
68	Harrow Town	7–1	Crown & Manor
69	Harwich & Parkeston	2–2	Clacton Town
70	Haywards Heath w/o-scr Hastings & St Leonards		
71	Headington United	1–3	Banbury Spencer
72	Hednesford Town	10–0	Thynnes Athletic
73	Hendon	2–1	Hoddesdon Town
74	Hereford United	6–1	Boldmere St Michaels
75	Hexham Hearts	5–0	Birtley
76	Hitchin Town	0–0	Arlesey Town
77	Horden Colliery Welfare w/o-scr East Tanfield Colliery Welfare		
78	Horsham	3–2	Lancing Athletic
79	Huntley & Palmers	3–2	Aylesbury United
80	Hyde United	2–1	Ashton United
81	Ibstock Penistone Rovers	1–4	Bedworth Town
82	Ilford	2–3	Chingford Town
83	Ilkeston Town	3–0	Sherwood Colliery
84	Jarrow	0–3	Newburn
85	Kiveton Park Colliery	1–1	Wombwell Athletic
86	Leatherhead	2–0	Cobham
87	Leighton United	2–0	St Neots & District
88	Leiston	1–1	Stoke United
89	Letchworth Town	3–0	Luton Amateur
90	Leyland Motors	1–0	Chorley
91	Leyton	2–0	Tilbury
92	Linby Colliery	3–2	Stamford
93	Littlehampton Town	7–2	Southwick
94	Llandudno	0–1	Newton Y M C A
95	Lloyds (Sittingbourne)	5–1	Erith & Belvedere
96	Longfleet St Mary's	4–2	Winchester City
97	Lostock Gralam	1–4	Buxton
98	Lowca	0–1	Parton United
99	Lowestoft Town	6–0	Sheringham
100	Lyons Club	0–5	Enfield
101	Macclesfield	0–3	Northwich Victoria
102	Matlock Town	3–8	Congleton Town
103	Metropolitan Police	7–2	Camberley
104	Milnthorpe Corinthians	8–2	Frizington United
105	Moira United	8–3	Rugby Town
106	Monckton Athletic	1–2	Firbeck Main Colliery
107	Morecambe	0–1	Fleetwood
108	Morris Sports	1–5	Hinckley Athletic
109	Moss Bay	6–2	Cleator Moor Celtic
110	Netherfield	5–1	Kells Welfare Centre
111	Newbiggin Colliery Welfare	2–5	North Shields
112	Newmarket Town	9–2	Chatteris Town
113	Newport I O W	4–0	Bitterne Nomads
114	Northampton Amateurs	1–4	Symingtons Recreation
115	Norton Woodseats	2–1	Grimethorpe Athletic
116	Norwich C E Y M S	2–0	Cromer
117	Old Grammarians	1–9	Achilles
118	Oxford City	6–1	Bicester Town
119	Penrith	9–2	Bowthorn Welfare
120	Pilkington Recreation	2–5	Ossett Town
121	Poole Town	5–3	Romsey Town
122	Potton United	2–1	Waterlows
123	R A O C Hilsea	2–3	Thornycroft Athletic
124	Radcliffe Welfare United	1–5	Shankhouse
125	Ramsgate Athletic	6–1	Betteshanger Colliery Welfare
126	Rawmarsh Welfare	1–4	Harworth Colliery Athletic
127	Redhill	11–1	Brookwood Hospital
128	Rhyl	2–1	Earlestown
129	Romford	3–0	Grays Athletic
130	Rossendale United	2–0	Bacup Borough
131	Royston Town	1–6	King's Lynn
132	Ruislip Manor	4–3	Wingate
133	Sawston United	2–8	Parson Drove
134	Scalegill	3–8	High Duty Alloys
135	Selby Town	4–2	Laceby
136	Sheppey United	5–4	Margate
137	Shilbottle Colliery Welfare	1–4	South Shields
138	Shoreham	2–1	Hove
139	Soundwell	4–3	St Austell
140	South Bank St Peters	0–2	Smith's Dock
141	South Hetton Colliery Welfare	1–1	Ferryhill Athletic
142	South Normanton Miners Welfare	5–1	Holbeach United
143	Southall	2–2	Slough Centre
144	Spalding United	2–1	Boston United
145	St Albans City	3–0	Polytechnic
146	Stafford Rangers	2–1	Sutton Town (Birmingham)
147	Stanley United	3–1	Silksworth Colliery Welfare
148	Steel Peech & Tozer S S	2–1	Hoyland Common Athletic
149	Stevenage Town	2–3	Leavesden
150	Stoneycroft	0–7	Prescot Cables
151	Stourbridge	3–1	Dudley Town
152	Stowmarket Corinthians	8–0	City Of Norwich School O B U
153	Street	6–1	Tavistock
154	Swindon G W R Corinthians	2–3	Welton Rovers
155	Tooting & Mitcham United	6–1	Guildford
156	Tow Law Town	0–1	Seaham Colliery Welfare
157	Uxbridge	4–3	Wycombe Wanderers
158	Vauxhall Motors	1–1	Baldock Town
159	Walton & Hersham	11–1	Twickenham
160	Warminster Town	3–1	Swindon Victoria
161	Wealdstone	4–0	Willesden
162	Wells City	4–2	Newton Abbot Spurs
163	West Auckland Town	0–1	Murton Colliery Welfare
164	Westbury United	2–1	Spencer Moulton
165	Weston Super Mare St Johns	1–1	Glastonbury
166	Weymouth	3–0	Andover
167	Whitstable	0–1	Ashford
168	Whitwick Colliery	2–0	Nuneaton Borough
169	Wigan Athletic	2–1	Skelmersdale United
170	Wilmslow Albion	0–6	Port Sunlight
171	Wiltshire County Mental Hospital	0–3	Salisbury
172	Winsford United	3–1	Glossop
173	Woking	1–1	Carshalton Athletic
174	Woodford Town	3–2	Bishop's Stortford
175	Worcester City	4–0	Birmingham City Transport
176	Worthing	4–3	Eastbourne Comrades
177	Yorkshire Amateur	2–1	Meltham Mills

=== Replays ===
Tie	Home team	Score	Away team
1	Wisbech Town	8–0	Abbey United
2	Wallingford Town	2–0	Abingdon Town
38	Upminster	2–0	Crittall Athletic
51	Finchley	2–1	Edgware Town
52	Sutton United	2–0	Epsom
69	Clacton Town	2–3	Harwich & Parkeston
76	Arlesey Town	2–3	Hitchin Town
85	Wombwell Athletic	4–1	Kiveton Park Colliery
88	Leiston	6–1	Stoke United
141	Ferryhill Athletic	1–2	South Hetton Colliery Welfare
143	Slough Centre	0–2	Southall
158	Baldock Town	2–5	Vauxhall Motors
165	Glastonbury	9–0	Weston Super Mare St Johns
173	Carshalton Athletic	4–7	Woking

== 1st qualifying round ==
=== Ties ===
Tie	Home team	Score	Away team
1	Annfield Plain	7–1	Shankhouse
2	Bangor City	4–2	Burscough
3	Barking	2–1	Harwich & Parkeston
4	Barnton	0–2	Hyde United
5	Barry Town	4–1	Ebbw Vale
6	Bedford Town	1–2	Vauxhall Motors
7	Bedworth Town	1–3	Whitwick Colliery
8	Berkhamsted Town	1–2	Banbury Spencer
9	Bexhill Town	5–1	Shoreham
10	Biggleswade & District	4–4	Letchworth Town
11	Billingham Synthonia	11–1	Cargo Fleet Works
12	Blyth Spartans	2–1	Ashington
13	Bognor Regis Town	3–0	Littlehampton Town
14	Brentwood & Warley	5–0	Woodford Town
15	Bromsgrove Rovers	3–2	Stourbridge
16	Clandown	2–1	Welton Rovers
17	Clitheroe	3–1	Horwich R M I
18	Coalville Town	0–4	Brush Sports
19	Congleton Town	2–2	Winsford United
20	Darwen	3–2	Atherton Collieries
21	Denaby United	3–1	Wombwell Athletic
22	Desborough Town w/o-scr Peterborough Westwood Works		
23	Dinnington Athletic	3–2	Creswell Colliery
24	East Cowes Victoria	3–1	Bournemouth Gasworks Athletic
25	Evenwood Town	3–1	Seaham Colliery Welfare
26	Filey Town	1–2	Portrack Shamrocks
27	Finchley	1–2	Hendon
28	Fleetwood	1–0	Nelson
29	Formby	0–1	St Helens Town
30	Frickley Colliery	3–0	South Kirkby Colliery
31	Glastonbury	4–3	Soundwell
32	Gloucester City	8–2	Clevedon
33	Goole Town	4–2	Bradford United
34	Gothic	5–2	Leiston
35	Grantham	6–0	Raleigh Athletic
36	Gravesend & Northfleet	4–1	Bromley
37	Great Yarmouth Town	3–2	Stowmarket Corinthians
38	Gresley Rovers	4–3	Hinckley Athletic
39	Hanham Athletic	4–1	Wells City
40	Harworth Colliery Athletic	2–0	Steel Peech & Tozer S S
41	Haywards Heath	0–1	Horsham
42	Hednesford Town	4–2	Worcester City
43	Hereford United	2–0	Halesowen Town
44	Histon Institute	2–1	March Town
45	Hitchin Town	4–2	Leighton United
46	Horden Colliery Welfare	3–1	Spennymoor United
47	Hounslow Town	1–3	Tooting & Mitcham United
48	Ilkeston Town	0–3	Linby Colliery
49	Kettering Town	2–2	Rushden Town
50	King's Lynn	7–0	Bury Town
51	Leatherhead	0–2	Sutton United
52	Leavesden	1–4	St Albans City
53	Leyland Motors	2–2	Rossendale United
54	Leyton	3–2	Chingford Town
55	Llanelli	1–1	Cardiff Corinthians
56	Lloyds (Sittingbourne)	1–2	Dartford
57	Longfleet St Mary's	4–0	Thornycroft Athletic
58	Lowestoft Town	3–1	Gorleston
59	Metropolitan Police	0–2	Woking
60	Milnthorpe Corinthians	11–0	Cockermouth
61	Moss Bay	2–3	High Duty Alloys
62	Netherfield	10–0	Florence & Ullcoats United
63	Newport I O W	2–4	Weymouth
64	Newton Y M C A	1–4	Rhyl
65	North Shields	0–0	Hexham Hearts
66	Northwich Victoria	5–0	Port Sunlight
67	Norton Woodseats	2–1	Firbeck Main Colliery
68	Norwich C E Y M S	3–4	Achilles
69	Ossett Town	3–2	Farsley Celtic
70	Oxford City	2–1	Huntley & Palmers
71	Parson Drove	3–2	Newmarket Town
72	Parton United	1–3	Penrith
73	Peterborough United	4–0	Symingtons Recreation
74	Ramsgate Athletic	4–0	Ashford
75	Ransome & Marles	2–0	Ollerton Colliery
76	Romford	2–1	Upminster
77	Ruislip Manor	3–5	Enfield
78	Ryde Sports	0–1	Poole Town
79	Salisbury	3–2	Peasedown Miners Welfare
80	Sheppey United	2–4	Dover
81	Smith's Dock	2–1	South Bank East End
82	South Bank	10–0	Bridlington Central United
83	South Hetton Colliery Welfare	0–1	Murton Colliery Welfare
84	South Normanton Miners Welfare	1–3	Spalding United
85	South Shields	5–2	Newburn
86	Stafford Rangers	4–3	Darlaston
87	Stanley United	3–2	Easington Colliery Welfare
88	Stewartby Works	1–6	Potton United
89	Street	4–1	Bideford
90	Tamworth	6–2	Moira United
91	Troedyrhiw	1–2	Lovells Athletic
92	Trowbridge Town	4–1	Warminster Town
93	Uxbridge	1–0	Southall
94	Wallingford Town	1–3	Maidenhead United
95	Walton & Hersham	1–2	Redhill
96	Wealdstone	2–1	Harrow Town
97	Wellingborough Town	1–0	Stewarts & Lloyds
98	Westbury United	3–2	Devizes Town
99	Wigan Athletic	1–2	Prescot Cables
100	Wisbech Town	4–4	Cambridge Town
101	Witton Albion	3–0	Buxton
102	Worthing	2–0	East Grinstead
103	Yorkshire Amateur	0–4	Selby Town

=== Replays ===
Tie	Home team	Score	Away team
10	Letchworth Town	3–3	Biggleswade & District
19	Winsford United	2–0	Congleton Town
49	Rushden Town	0–1	Kettering Town
53	Rossendale United	4–2	Leyland Motors
55	Cardiff Corinthians	0–2	Llanelli
65	Hexham Hearts	1–2	North Shields
100	Cambridge Town	5–2	Wisbech Town

=== 2nd replay ===
Tie	Home team	Score	Away team
10	Letchworth Town	0–4	Biggleswade & District

== 2nd qualifying round ==
=== Ties ===
Tie	Home team	Score	Away team
1	Banbury Spencer	3–1	Uxbridge
2	Barking	3–0	Leyton
3	Barry Town	3–1	Llanelli
4	Biggleswade & District	1–4	Vauxhall Motors
5	Blyth Spartans	2–1	North Shields
6	Bromsgrove Rovers	8–3	Hednesford Town
7	Brush Sports	4–3	Tamworth
8	Clitheroe	0–3	Fleetwood
9	Dartford	2–0	Ramsgate Athletic
10	East Cowes Victoria	1–2	Poole Town
11	Evenwood Town	1–2	Horden Colliery Welfare
12	Frickley Colliery	3–1	Goole Town
13	Glastonbury	1–1	Gloucester City
14	Gothic	4–0	Achilles
15	Gravesend & Northfleet	4–1	Dover
16	Great Yarmouth Town	2–0	Lowestoft Town
17	Gresley Rovers	0–3	Whitwick Colliery
18	Hanham Athletic	2–5	Street
19	Harworth Colliery Athletic	2–0	Denaby United
20	Hendon	3–0	Enfield
21	High Duty Alloys	4–4	Penrith
22	Histon Institute	3–4	King's Lynn
23	Horsham	4–0	Bexhill Town
24	Kettering Town	2–2	Desborough Town
25	Linby Colliery	1–2	Grantham
26	Longfleet St Mary's	0–4	Weymouth
27	Lovells Athletic	3–1	Merthyr Tydfil
28	Murton Colliery Welfare	1–2	Annfield Plain
29	Netherfield	9–2	Milnthorpe Corinthians
30	Northwich Victoria	1–3	Witton Albion
31	Norton Woodseats	2–1	Dinnington Athletic
32	Ossett Town	1–4	Selby Town
33	Oxford City	8–0	Maidenhead United
34	Parson Drove	1–3	Cambridge Town
35	Potton United	1–1	Hitchin Town
36	Redhill	4–3	Woking
37	Rhyl	2–1	Prescot Cables
38	Romford	3–1	Brentwood & Warley
39	Rossendale United	4–0	Darwen
40	Smith's Dock	2–5	Billingham Synthonia
41	South Bank	1–3	Portrack Shamrocks
42	Spalding United	0–1	Ransome & Marles
43	St Albans City	0–5	Wealdstone
44	St Helens Town	0–4	Bangor City
45	Stafford Rangers	3–5	Hereford United
46	Stanley United	2–3	South Shields (South Shields disqualified)
47	Sutton United	0–1	Tooting & Mitcham United
48	Trowbridge Town	4–1	Salisbury
49	Wellingborough Town	2–3	Peterborough United
50	Westbury United	0–0	Clandown
51	Winsford United	4–0	Hyde United
52	Worthing	1–4	Bognor Regis Town

=== Replays ===
Tie	Home team	Score	Away team
13	Gloucester City	3–1	Glastonbury
21	Penrith	3–2	High Duty Alloys
24	Desborough Town	0–3	Kettering Town
35	Hitchin Town	3–1	Potton United
50	Clandown	1–2	Westbury United

== 3rd qualifying round ==
=== Ties ===
Tie	Home team	Score	Away team
1	Banbury Spencer	2–3	Oxford City
2	Bangor City	0–2	Rhyl
3	Barry Town	1–3	Lovells Athletic
4	Billingham Synthonia	5–0	Portrack Shamrocks
5	Blyth Spartans	0–2	Annfield Plain
6	Bromsgrove Rovers	2–4	Hereford United
7	Fleetwood	0–1	Rossendale United
8	Gloucester City	4–1	Street
9	Gothic	3–2	Great Yarmouth Town
10	Gravesend & Northfleet	0–1	Dartford
11	Harworth Colliery Athletic	1–6	Norton Woodseats
12	Hendon	4–2	Wealdstone
13	Horsham	1–2	Bognor Regis Town
14	King's Lynn	4–5	Cambridge Town
15	Netherfield	2–1	Penrith
16	Peterborough United	2–1	Kettering Town
17	Ransome & Marles	2–0	Grantham
18	Romford	3–2	Barking
19	Selby Town	2–0	Frickley Colliery
20	Stanley United	1–3	Horden Colliery Welfare
21	Tooting & Mitcham United	5–1	Redhill
22	Trowbridge Town	8–0	Westbury United
23	Vauxhall Motors	2–1	Hitchin Town
24	Weymouth	4–2	Poole Town
25	Whitwick Colliery	1–2	Brush Sports
26	Winsford United	0–1	Witton Albion

== 4th qualifying round ==
The teams that entered in this round are: Wimbledon, Barnet, Bishop Auckland, Bath City, Yeovil Town, South Liverpool, Gillingham, Cheltenham Town, Guildford City, Chelmsford City, Gainsborough Trinity, Shrewsbury Town, Scarborough, Workington, Dulwich Hamlet, Walthamstow Avenue, Kingstonian, Wellington Town, Runcorn, Stalybridge Celtic, Lancaster City, Scunthorpe United, Stockton and Kidderminster Harriers

=== Ties ===
Tie	Home team	Score	Away team
1	Barnet	5–4	Hendon
2	Bath City	2–3	Gloucester City
3	Billingham Synthonia	2–1	Annfield Plain
4	Bognor Regis Town	1–8	Dulwich Hamlet
5	Cambridge Town	6–1	Gothic
6	Guildford City	0–2	Chelmsford City
7	Hereford United	4–3	Oxford City
8	Kidderminster Harriers	5–2	Brush Sports
9	Lovells Athletic	2–3	Yeovil Town
10	Netherfield	3–1	Rossendale United
11	Norton Woodseats	2–4	Gainsborough Trinity
12	Peterborough United	3–1	Ransome & Marles
13	Rhyl	3–0	South Liverpool
14	Romford	2–1	Gillingham
15	Runcorn	3–1	Stalybridge Celtic
16	Scarborough	3–0	Bishop Auckland (Match declared void)
17	Scunthorpe & Lindsey United	2–1	Selby Town
18	Stockton	1–2	Horden Colliery Welfare
19	Tooting & Mitcham United	1–1	Kingstonian
20	Vauxhall Motors	0–2	Walthamstow Avenue
21	Wellington Town	2–1	Cheltenham Town
22	Weymouth	2–0	Trowbridge Town
23	Wimbledon	1–2	Dartford
24	Witton Albion	4–0	Shrewsbury Town
25	Workington	1–1	Lancaster City

=== Replays ===
Tie	Home team	Score	Away team
16	Bishop Auckland	0–3	Scarborough
19	Kingstonian	2–4	Tooting & Mitcham United
25	Lancaster City	2–2	Workington

=== 2nd replay ===
Tie	Home team	Score	Away team
25	Workington	2–1	Lancaster City

== 1948–49 FA Cup ==
See 1948–49 FA Cup for details of the rounds from the first round proper onwards.
