= Cannock Town F.C. =

English association football club

Cannock Town
- Full name: Cannock Town Football Club
- Founded: c. 1875
- Dissolved: 1937
- 1936–37: Birmingham & District League (resigned)

Cannock Town F.C. was an English association football club based in Cannock, Staffordshire. Cannock Town commenced competitive league football in the Walsall & District League in 1892–93 and entered the FA Cup for the first time in the 1908–09 season and reached the second qualifying round before being knocked out by Hednesford Town. In 1921, Cannock Town joined the Birmingham & District League, but left seven years later after finishing in the bottom half of the table every season. In 1933 the club returned to the league, but Cannock Town folded during the 1936–37 campaign and were forced to resign from the league, and their results expunged from the records. This was also the last season in which the side entered the FA Cup, where they lost 6–1 to Wellington Town in the preliminary round.

An unrelated club with the same name competed in the Staffordshire Senior Football League in the 1993–94 season.

In 2012 a club of the same name opened as a youth football club.
