= Bullcroft Main Colliery F.C. =

English Football Club

Bullcroft Main Colliery
- Full name: Bullcroft Main Colliery Football Club

Bullcroft Main Colliery F.C. was an English association football club based in Carcroft, Doncaster, South Yorkshire.

== History ==
Little is known of the club other than that it competed in the FA Cup in the 1910s and 1920s.

=== Records ===
- Best FA Cup performance: 3rd Qualifying Round, 1923–24
