= Prospect United F.C. =

Prospect United
- Full name: Prospect United Football Club

Prospect United F.C. was an English association football club based in Hoyland, Barnsley, South Yorkshire.

== History ==
The club was formed after the end of the First World War, and played in the Barnsley Association League (winning the title twice) and the FA Cup.

== Honours ==
- Barnsley Association League
  - Champions - 1920/21, 1924/25

== Records ==
- Best FA Cup performance: 1st Qualifying Round, three occasions
