= Cudworth Village F.C. =

English association football club in Cudworth, South Yorkshire

Cudworth Village
- Full name: Cudworth Village Football Club

Cudworth Village F.C. (English: /ˈkʊdɜːrθ/ CUD-erth) was an English association football club based in Cudworth, South Yorkshire.

== History ==
Little is known of the club other than that it was formed in 1919, and competed in the FA Cup in the 1920s and 1930s. The club was founded by workers from the local glass blowers factory. The date of the club disbanding is up to interpretation.

== Records ==
- Best FA Cup performance: 2nd Qualifying Round, 1928–29
