= Birdwell F.C. =

Birdwell Football Club
- Full name: Birdwell Football Club
- Nickname: the Birds
- Dissolved: 1928
- Ground: New Recreation Ground
Home colours

Birdwell F.C. was an English association football club based in Birdwell, Barnsley, South Yorkshire.

== History ==
The club was formed in the 19th century, and entered the FA Cup on 11 occasions between 1907 and 1928. The club had been due to play in the Barnsley Association League and various local cups in the 1928–29 season, but forgot to enter the FA Cup. After being fined 10s for not playing in the Beckett Hospital Cup (due to a clash of fixtures), the club appears to have disbanded.

== Colours ==
The club wore red shirts.

== Ground ==
The club played at the New Recreation Ground.

== Honours ==
- Sheffield & Hallamshire Minor Cup League
  - Champions - 1895–96

== Records ==
- Best FA Cup performance: 2nd Qualifying Round, 1921–22 taking Wombwell to a replay before losing 1–0.

== Notable players ==
- Harry Ruddlesdin, who started his career with the club in the 1890s, going on to play for England.
