= Bob Ferrier (Scottish footballer) =

Scottish footballer

Personal information
- Full name: Robert Ferrier
- Date of birth: 14 August 1872
- Place of birth: Dumbarton, Scotland
- Date of death: 11 December 1947 (aged 75)
- Place of death: Dumbarton, Scotland
- Position: Inside forward

Senior career*
Years	Team	Apps	(Gls)
1891–1894	Dumbarton	20	(6)
1894–1906	Sheffield Wednesday	308	(16)
Total		328	(22)
- * Club domestic league appearances and goals

Robert Ferrier (14 August 1872 – 11 December 1947) was a Scottish professional footballer.

== Career ==
Ferrier played for Dumbarton and Sheffield Wednesday, as an inside forward. In a 12-year spell with Wednesday, he was involved in the club's relegation from the Football League First Division in 1899, promotion as winners of the Second Division in 1900, followed by First Division championships in 1903 and 1904 (he was not involved in their two FA Cup final wins of that era). The closest he got to international recognition was an appearance in the annual Home Scots v Anglo-Scots trial match in 1901.

== Personal life ==
His son, likewise named Robert and known as Bob, was also a footballer. The younger Ferrier achieved success playing for Motherwell, but was never selected for Scotland having been born in Sheffield while his father was playing in the city. His brother-in-law Willie Speedie (brother of Scottish international Finlay Speedie) and nephew Bob Speedie played for Dumbarton.

== Honours ==
Dumbarton

- Dumbartonshire Cup: Winners 1892–93, 1893–94.
