= Monckton Athletic F.C. =

Monckton Athletic
- Full name: Monckton Athletic Football Club

Monckton Athletics Football Club was an English association football club based in Ryhill, West Yorkshire, playing at the village's welfare ground and with headquarters in the village's Liberal Club. They won the Sheffield Association League in 1911, and were regular participants in the FA Cup.

== Records ==
- Furthest FA Cup run – 2nd qualifying round, 1930–31, 1945–46
