= 2002–03 Hellenic Football League =

The 2002–03 Hellenic Football League season was the 50th in the history of the Hellenic Football League, a football competition in England.

== Premier Division ==
Hellenic Football League Premier Division
- Season: 2002–03
- Champions: North Leigh
- Promoted: Yate Town
- Relegated: Wantage Town
- Matches: 420
- Goals: 1,299 (3.09 per match)

The Premier Division featured 19 clubs which competed in the division last season, along with two new clubs, promoted from Division One West:

- Hook Norton
- Pewsey Vale

=== League table ===
Pos	Team	Pld	W	D	L	GF	GA	GD	Pts	Promotion or relegation
1	North Leigh	40	29	6	5	84	36	+48	93	
2	Yate Town	40	25	8	7	87	42	+45	83	Promoted to the Southern Football League
3	Carterton Town	40	22	17	1	61	29	+32	83	
4	Highworth Town	40	23	10	7	79	41	+38	79	
5	Didcot Town	40	22	6	12	77	39	+38	72	
6	Fairford Town	40	21	8	11	65	30	+35	71	
7	Brackley Town	40	18	12	10	84	42	+42	66	
8	Abingdon United	40	20	6	14	70	52	+18	66	
9	Bishop's Cleeve	40	19	7	14	68	50	+18	64	
10	Henley Town	40	17	10	13	69	48	+21	61	
11	Southall Town	40	18	7	15	75	65	+10	61	
12	Hook Norton	40	15	13	12	67	55	+12	58	
13	Shortwood United	40	15	10	15	64	60	+4	55	
14	Tuffley Rovers	40	12	9	19	56	76	−20	45	
15	Wootton Bassett Town	40	10	10	20	36	70	−34	40	
16	Gloucester United	40	9	8	23	48	89	−41	32 (Note: Gloucester United were deducted three points.)	
17	Almondsbury Town	40	8	7	25	43	77	−34	31	
18	Pegasus Juniors	40	8	7	25	45	108	−63	31	
19	Pewsey Vale	40	7	8	25	45	93	−48	29	
20	Bicester Town	40	5	8	27	40	99	−59	23	
21	Wantage Town	40	5	7	28	36	98	−62	22	Relegated to Division One East

Source: fchd
Rules for classification: 1) points; 2) goal difference; 3) number of goals scored.

== Division One East ==
Hellenic Football League Division One East
- Season: 2002–03
- Champions: Quarry Nomads
- Matches: 272
- Goals: 941 (3.46 per match)

Division One East featured 16 clubs which competed in the division last season, along with two clubs:

- Holyport, joined from the Hayes & Giles League
- Letcombe, transferred from Division One West

=== League table ===
Pos	Team	Pld	W	D	L	GF	GA	GD	Pts	Promotion or relegation
1	Quarry Nomads	32	21	4	7	76	41	+35	67	Transferred to Division One West
2	Penn & Tylers Green	32	19	6	7	63	33	+30	63	
3	Finchampstead	32	17	9	6	61	32	+29	60	
4	Rayners Lane	32	18	5	9	66	40	+26	59	
5	Chalfont Wasps	32	18	4	10	67	44	+23	58	
6	Eton Wick	32	16	9	7	72	49	+23	57	
7	Milton United	32	14	9	9	53	39	+14	51	
8	Binfield	32	14	6	12	73	46	+27	48	
9	Letcombe	32	11	6	15	45	53	−8	39	
10	Englefield Green Rovers	32	12	3	17	47	62	−15	39	
11	RS Basingstoke	32	10	7	15	55	64	−9	37	Resigned to the Hampshire League
12	Bisley Sports	32	10	7	15	43	64	−21	37	
13	Hounslow Borough	32	9	8	15	61	73	−12	35	
14	Prestwood	32	8	10	14	43	63	−20	34	
15	Holyport	32	10	2	20	37	78	−41	32	
16	Martin Baker Sports	32	4	11	17	41	74	−33	23	
17	Drayton Wanderers	32	5	6	21	38	86	−48	21	Resigned from the league
18	Aston Clinton	0	0	0	0	0	0	0	0	Resigned from the league, record expunged

Source: fchd
Rules for classification: 1) points; 2) goal difference; 3) number of goals scored.

== Division One West ==
Hellenic Football League Division One West
- Season: 2002–03
- Champions: Slimbridge
- Promoted: Slimbridge; Chipping Norton Town
- Matches: 380
- Goals: 1,301 (3.42 per match)

Division One West featured 14 clubs which competed in the division last season, along with six new clubs:

- Adderbury Park
- Cheltenham Saracens, relegated from the Premier Division
- Harrow Hill, relegated from the Premier Division
- New College Academy, new club
- Slimbridge, joined from the Gloucestershire County League
- Witney United, new club

=== League table ===
Pos	Team	Pld	W	D	L	GF	GA	GD	Pts	Promotion or relegation
1	Slimbridge	38	29	6	3	114	26	+88	93	Promoted to the Premier Division
2	Chipping Norton Town	38	24	10	4	76	33	+43	82	Promoted to the Premier Division
3	Purton	38	25	1	12	99	49	+50	76	
4	Winterbourne United	38	22	6	10	80	41	+39	72	
5	Ardley United	38	21	6	11	93	47	+46	69	
6	Old Woodstock Town	38	19	6	13	65	54	+11	63	
7	Kidlington	38	15	9	14	67	76	−9	54	
8	Headington Amateurs	38	13	13	12	71	70	+1	52	
9	Cheltenham Saracens	38	13	12	13	61	54	+7	51	
10	Easington Sports	38	15	6	17	54	67	−13	51	
11	Adderbury Park	38	14	8	16	70	85	−15	50	
12	Shrivenham	38	13	10	15	55	65	−10	49	
13	New College Academy	38	14	4	20	57	67	−10	46	Resigned to the Wiltshire League
14	Malmesbury Victoria	38	12	8	18	54	63	−9	44	
15	Witney United	38	9	13	16	54	74	−20	40	
16	Middle Barton	38	10	9	19	49	83	−34	39	
17	Cirencester United	38	9	10	19	49	77	−28	37	
18	Harrow Hill	38	10	5	23	45	78	−33	35	
19	Clanfield	38	9	7	22	43	82	−39	34	
20	Ross Town	38	7	5	26	45	110	−65	26	

Source: fchd
Rules for classification: 1) points; 2) goal difference; 3) number of goals scored.
