= 2004–05 Hellenic Football League =

The 2004–05 Hellenic Football League season was the 52nd in the history of the Hellenic Football League, a football competition in England.

== Premier Division ==
Hellenic Football League Premier Division
- Season: 2004–05
- Champions: Highworth Town
- Relegated: Bicester Town; Wootton Bassett Town; Pewsey Vale
- Matches: 462
- Goals: 1,359 (2.94 per match)

Premier Division featured 18 clubs which competed in the division last season, along with four new clubs:

- Ardley United, promoted from Division One West
- Milton United, promoted from Division One East
- Wantage Town, promoted from Division One East
- Witney United, promoted from Division One West

=== League table ===
Pos	Team	Pld	W	D	L	GF	GA	GD	Pts	Promotion or relegation
1	Highworth Town	42	30	8	4	101	33	+68	98	
2	Didcot Town	42	31	5	6	99	21	+78	97 (Note: Didcot Town were deducted one point.)	
3	Bishop's Cleeve	42	25	11	6	86	30	+56	86	
4	Slimbridge	42	26	8	8	87	48	+39	86	
5	Abingdon United	42	25	9	8	88	49	+39	84	
6	Carterton Town	42	24	8	10	72	48	+24	80	
7	North Leigh	42	24	7	11	76	46	+30	79	
8	Fairford Town	42	19	5	18	62	54	+8	62	
9	Almondsbury Town	42	16	13	13	80	59	+21	61	
10	Wantage Town	42	13	16	13	52	43	+9	55	
11	Witney United	42	15	10	17	45	52	−7	55	
12	Tuffley Rovers	42	12	14	16	43	47	−4	50	
13	Milton United	42	14	7	21	48	67	−19	49	
14	Henley Town	42	14	8	20	58	79	−21	47 (Note: Henley Town were deducted three points.)	
15	Shortwood United	42	13	7	22	58	77	−19	46	
16	Pegasus Juniors	42	12	8	22	62	95	−33	44	
17	Hungerford Town	42	11	9	22	45	66	−21	42	
18	Ardley United	42	9	15	18	48	71	−23	42	
19	Chipping Norton Town	42	11	7	24	39	83	−44	40	
20	Bicester Town	42	8	4	30	38	103	−65	28	Relegated to Division One East
21	Wootton Bassett Town	42	6	9	27	30	84	−54	27	Relegated to Division One West
22	Pewsey Vale	42	6	8	28	42	104	−62	26	Relegated to Division One West

Source: fchd
Rules for classification: 1) points; 2) goal difference; 3) number of goals scored.

== Division One East ==
Hellenic Football League Division One East
- Season: 2004–05
- Champions: Eton Wick
- Matches: 306
- Goals: 1,094 (3.58 per match)

Division One East featured 14 clubs which competed in the division last season, along with four clubs:

- Banbury United reserves
- Kintbury Rangers, joined from the North Berks League
- Old Woodstock Town, transferred from Division One West
- Wokingham & Emmbrook, new club formed as a merger of Wokingham Town from the Isthmian League and Emmbrook Sports from the Reading Football League

=== League table ===
Pos	Team	Pld	W	D	L	GF	GA	GD	Pts	Promotion or relegation
1	Eton Wick	34	23	8	3	100	35	+65	77	
2	Kintbury Rangers	34	23	5	6	79	33	+46	74	
3	Penn & Tylers Green	34	23	3	8	94	51	+43	72	
4	Finchampstead	34	19	7	8	62	37	+25	64	
5	Binfield	34	16	8	10	54	35	+19	56	
6	Banbury United reserves	34	16	8	10	66	68	−2	56	
7	Badshot Lea	34	16	4	14	75	63	+12	52	
8	Rayners Lane	34	15	5	14	75	56	+19	50	
9	Chinnor	34	12	8	14	49	47	+2	44	
10	Hounslow Borough	34	12	7	15	61	85	−24	43	
11	Wokingham & Emmbrook	34	13	3	18	50	66	−16	42	
12	Letcombe	34	11	7	16	53	66	−13	40	Transferred to Division One West
13	Englefield Green Rovers	34	11	7	16	49	67	−18	40	
14	Old Woodstock Town	34	10	9	15	50	64	−14	39	Transferred to Division One West
15	Holyport	34	9	7	18	44	91	−47	34	
16	Prestwood	34	9	4	21	50	82	−32	31	
17	Chalfont Wasps	34	7	7	20	50	69	−19	28	
18	Bisley Sports	34	6	3	25	33	79	−46	21	

Source: fchd
Rules for classification: 1) points; 2) goal difference; 3) number of goals scored.

== Division One West ==
Hellenic Football League Division One West
- Season: 2004–05
- Champions: Shrivenham
- Promoted: Shrivenham; Kidlington
- Matches: 306
- Goals: 1,099 (3.59 per match)

Division One West featured 15 clubs which competed in the division last season, along with three new clubs:

- Hook Norton, relegated from the Premier Division
- Trowbridge Town, joined from the Wiltshire League
- Tytherington Rocks, joined from the Gloucestershire County League

=== League table ===
Pos	Team	Pld	W	D	L	GF	GA	GD	Pts	Promotion or relegation
1	Shrivenham	34	25	3	6	91	36	+55	78	Promoted to the Premier Division
2	Trowbridge Town	34	24	5	5	97	38	+59	77	
3	Kidlington	34	20	6	8	79	49	+30	66	Promoted to the Premier Division
4	Tytherington Rocks	34	20	4	10	91	54	+37	64	
5	Easington Sports	34	18	7	9	60	38	+22	61	
6	Cheltenham Saracens	34	18	6	10	60	45	+15	60	
7	Headington Amateurs	34	17	6	11	69	44	+25	57	
8	Harrow Hill	34	16	6	12	60	44	+16	54	
9	Winterbourne United	34	15	7	12	73	53	+20	52	
10	Clanfield	34	13	7	14	55	51	+4	46	
11	Hook Norton	34	12	10	12	51	56	−5	46	
12	Ross Town	34	11	7	16	57	54	+3	40	
13	Purton	34	9	8	17	39	61	−22	35	
14	Cirencester United	34	7	11	16	40	63	−23	32	
15	Quarry Nomads	34	10	1	23	61	106	−45	31	Transferred to Division One East
16	Middle Barton	34	7	4	23	36	116	−80	25	
17	Malmesbury Victoria	34	7	3	24	33	80	−47	24	
18	Adderbury Park	34	6	1	27	47	111	−64	19	Resigned to the Oxfordshire Senior League

Source: fchd
Rules for classification: 1) points; 2) goal difference; 3) number of goals scored.
