= 2001–02 Hellenic Football League =

The 2001–02 Hellenic Football League season was the 49th in the history of the Hellenic Football League, a football competition in England.

== Premier Division ==
Hellenic Football League Premier Division
- Season: 2001–02
- Champions: North Leigh
- Relegated: Harrow Hill; Cheltenham Saracens
- Matches: 420
- Goals: 1,475 (3.51 per match)

The Premier Division featured 18 clubs which competed in the division last season, along with four new clubs:

- Bishop's Cleeve, promoted from Division One West
- Gloucester United, promoted from Division One West
- Henley Town, promoted from Division One East
- Southall Town, promoted from Division One East

=== League table ===
Pos	Team	Pld	W	D	L	GF	GA	GD	Pts	Promotion or relegation
1	North Leigh	42	30	8	4	97	36	+61	98	
2	Gloucester United	42	29	6	7	106	48	+58	93	
3	Yate Town	42	24	13	5	105	39	+66	85	
4	Abingdon United	42	24	8	10	86	51	+35	80	
5	Didcot Town	42	24	6	12	93	56	+37	78	
6	Fairford Town	42	21	10	11	72	42	+30	73	
7	Brackley Town	42	20	9	13	70	55	+15	69	
8	Tuffley Rovers	42	19	11	12	53	61	−8	68	
9	Shortwood United	42	20	7	15	67	66	+1	67	
10	Bishop's Cleeve	42	19	8	15	79	51	+28	65	
11	Carterton Town	42	18	10	14	71	48	+23	64	
12	Wantage Town	42	15	10	17	67	65	+2	55	
13	Pegasus Juniors	42	16	5	21	65	92	−27	53	
14	Southall Town	42	14	9	19	55	66	−11	51	
15	Highworth Town	42	14	7	21	66	77	−11	49	
16	Henley Town	42	12	10	20	51	65	−14	46	
17	Cirencester Academy	42	11	11	20	61	71	−10	44	Resigned from the league
18	Almondsbury Town	42	12	6	24	53	84	−31	42	
19	Wootton Bassett Town	42	11	9	22	39	75	−36	42	
20	Bicester Town	42	9	6	27	58	97	−39	33	
21	Harrow Hill	42	7	2	33	31	104	−73	23	Relegated to Division One West
22	Cheltenham Saracens	42	3	9	30	30	126	−96	18	Relegated to Division One West

Source: fchd
Rules for classification: 1) points; 2) goal difference; 3) number of goals scored.

== Division One East ==
Hellenic Football League Division One East
- Season: 2001–02
- Champions: Finchampstead
- Matches: 272
- Goals: 954 (3.51 per match)

Division One East featured 15 clubs which competed in the division last season, along with two clubs:

- Bisley Sports, joined from the Surrey County Premier League
- Milton United, relegated from the Premier Division

Also, Harrow Hill Rovers changed name to Hounslow Borough.

=== League table ===
Pos	Team	Pld	W	D	L	GF	GA	GD	Pts	Promotion or relegation
1	Finchampstead	32	20	6	6	73	40	+33	66	
2	Aston Clinton	32	19	7	6	76	37	+39	64	
3	RS Basingstoke	32	16	7	9	64	53	+11	55	
4	Martin Baker Sports	32	15	8	9	68	43	+25	53	
5	Englefield Green Rovers	32	16	4	12	64	51	+13	52	
6	Milton United	32	12	13	7	50	37	+13	49	
7	Bisley Sports	32	14	5	13	53	53	0	47	
8	Prestwood	32	13	6	13	58	58	0	45	
9	Penn & Tylers Green	32	12	8	12	56	50	+6	44	
10	Eton Wick	32	12	6	14	53	59	−6	42	
11	Quarry Nomads	32	12	6	14	54	74	−20	42	
12	Drayton Wanderers	32	11	4	17	56	86	−30	37	
13	Peppard	32	8	11	13	39	46	−7	35	Resigned from the league
14	Binfield	32	9	7	16	44	53	−9	34	
15	Rayners Lane	32	8	10	14	55	66	−11	34	
16	Hounslow Borough	32	5	11	16	47	76	−29	26	
17	Chalfont Wasps	32	6	9	17	44	72	−28	24 (Note: Chalfont Wasps were deducted three points.)	

Source: fchd
Rules for classification: 1) points; 2) goal difference; 3) number of goals scored.

== Division One West ==
Hellenic Football League Division One West
- Season: 2001–02
- Champions: Hook Norton
- Promoted: Hook Norton; Pewsey Vale
- Matches: 272
- Goals: 919 (3.38 per match)

Division One West featured 13 clubs which competed in the division last season, along with five new clubs:

- Chipping Norton Town, joined from the Oxfordshire Senior League
- Hook Norton, joined from the Oxfordshire Senior League
- Pewsey Vale, transferred from the Western League
- Shrivenham, joined from the North Berks League
- Winterbourne United, joined from the Gloucestershire County League

=== League table ===
Pos	Team	Pld	W	D	L	GF	GA	GD	Pts	Promotion or relegation
1	Hook Norton	32	22	8	2	69	21	+48	74	Promoted to the Premier Division
2	Pewsey Vale	32	20	5	7	80	39	+41	65	Promoted to the Premier Division
3	Ardley United	32	18	8	6	83	51	+32	62	
4	Purton	32	18	4	10	63	52	+11	58	
5	Ross Town	32	15	10	7	56	41	+15	55	
6	Winterbourne United	32	15	9	8	73	41	+32	54	
7	Middle Barton	32	13	8	11	62	64	−2	47	
8	Old Woodstock Town	32	11	10	11	47	38	+9	43	
9	Shrivenham	32	12	6	14	57	63	−6	42	
10	Kidlington	32	11	8	13	36	38	−2	41	
11	Chipping Norton Town	32	10	7	15	49	68	−19	37	
12	Malmesbury Victoria	32	8	11	13	49	53	−4	35	
13	Easington Sports	32	9	8	15	37	54	−17	35	
14	Clanfield	32	7	9	16	40	61	−21	30	
15	Cirencester United	32	8	4	20	36	69	−33	28	
16	Headington Amateurs	32	6	7	19	40	79	−39	25	
17	Letcombe	32	3	10	19	42	87	−45	19	Transferred to Division One East
18	Witney Academy	0	0	0	0	0	0	0	0	Resigned from the league, record expunged

Source: fchd
Rules for classification: 1) points; 2) goal difference; 3) number of goals scored.
