= 2003–04 Hellenic Football League =

The 2003–04 Hellenic Football League season was the 51st in the history of the Hellenic Football League, a football competition in England.

== Premier Division ==
Hellenic Football League Premier Division
- Season: 2003–04
- Champions: Brackley Town
- Promoted: Brackley Town
- Relegated: Hook Norton
- Matches: 462
- Goals: 1,381 (2.99 per match)

Premier Division featured 19 clubs which competed in the division last season, along with three new clubs:

- Chipping Norton Town, promoted from Division One West
- Hungerford Town, resigned from the Isthmian League
- Slimbridge, promoted from Division One West

=== League table ===
Pos	Team	Pld	W	D	L	GF	GA	GD	Pts	Promotion or relegation
1	Brackley Town	42	28	8	6	106	36	+70	92	Promoted to the Southern Football League
2	Southall Town	42	28	8	6	104	42	+62	92	Club folded
3	Bishop's Cleeve	42	27	8	7	94	36	+58	89	
4	Slimbridge	42	26	11	5	85	29	+56	89	
5	Didcot Town	42	28	4	10	90	35	+55	88	
6	Hungerford Town	42	25	6	11	90	45	+45	80 (Note: Hungerford Town were deducted one point.)	
7	Carterton Town	42	22	9	11	63	45	+18	75	
8	North Leigh	42	21	6	15	70	51	+19	69	
9	Highworth Town	42	19	11	12	66	45	+21	68	
10	Fairford Town	42	21	8	13	74	63	+11	68 (Note: Fairford Town were deducted three points.)	
11	Abingdon United	42	19	11	12	54	49	+5	68	
12	Chipping Norton Town	42	15	9	18	57	68	−11	54	
13	Tuffley Rovers	42	11	13	18	43	49	−6	46	
14	Bicester Town	42	11	6	25	32	64	−32	39	
15	Henley Town	42	11	6	25	44	82	−38	39	
16	Wootton Bassett Town	42	11	5	26	38	73	−35	38	
17	Pegasus Juniors	42	11	5	26	45	105	−60	38	
18	Pewsey Vale	42	10	7	25	58	99	−41	37	
19	Shortwood United	42	11	4	27	53	95	−42	37	
20	Hook Norton	42	8	12	22	42	76	−34	36	Relegated to Division One West
21	Almondsbury Town	42	10	5	27	33	86	−53	35	
22	Gloucester United	42	4	8	30	40	108	−68	20	Club folded

Source: fchd
Rules for classification: 1) points; 2) goal difference; 3) number of goals scored.

== Division One East ==
Hellenic Football League Division One East
- Season: 2003–04
- Champions: Wantage Town
- Promoted: Wantage Town; Milton United
- Matches: 272
- Goals: 936 (3.44 per match)

Division One East featured 14 clubs which competed in the division last season, along with three clubs:

- Badshot Lea, joined from the Surrey Intermediate League
- Chinnor, joined from the Oxfordshire Senior League
- Wantage Town, relegated from the Premier Division

=== League table ===
Pos	Team	Pld	W	D	L	GF	GA	GD	Pts	Promotion or relegation
1	Wantage Town	32	23	7	2	85	16	+69	76	Promoted to the Premier Division
2	Letcombe	32	19	10	3	60	27	+33	67	
3	Milton United	32	16	11	5	71	45	+26	59	Promoted to the Premier Division
4	Eton Wick	32	15	9	8	64	45	+19	54	
5	Binfield	32	15	8	9	52	38	+14	53	
6	Rayners Lane	32	14	9	9	73	51	+22	51	
7	Chalfont Wasps	32	15	4	13	54	51	+3	49	
8	Finchampstead	32	12	9	11	54	42	+12	45	
9	Martin Baker Sports	32	12	3	17	49	73	−24	39	Resigned to the Middlesex County League
10	Penn & Tylers Green	32	9	11	12	46	54	−8	38	
11	Chinnor	32	10	5	17	46	57	−11	35	
12	Bisley Sports	32	9	8	15	38	52	−14	35	
13	Prestwood	32	9	6	17	63	75	−12	33	
14	Badshot Lea	32	9	6	17	50	73	−23	33	
15	Englefield Green Rovers	32	8	7	17	44	76	−32	31	
16	Hounslow Borough	32	8	5	19	45	80	−35	28 (Note: Hounslow Borough were deducted one point.)	
17	Holyport	32	6	8	18	42	81	−39	26	

Source: fchd
Rules for classification: 1) points; 2) goal difference; 3) number of goals scored.

== Division One West ==
Hellenic Football League Division One West
- Season: 2003–04
- Champions: Purton
- Promoted: Ardley United; Witney United
- Matches: 306
- Goals: 1,014 (3.31 per match)

Division One West featured 17 clubs which competed in the division last season, along with one new club:

- Quarry Nomads, transferred from Division One East

=== League table ===
Pos	Team	Pld	W	D	L	GF	GA	GD	Pts	Promotion or relegation
1	Purton	34	24	10	0	83	25	+58	82	
2	Ross Town	34	22	8	4	73	34	+39	74	
3	Shrivenham	34	22	6	6	78	26	+52	72	
4	Witney United	34	18	9	7	63	34	+29	63	Promoted to the Premier Division
5	Ardley United	34	17	10	7	68	46	+22	61	Promoted to the Premier Division
6	Easington Sports	34	12	16	6	49	40	+9	52	
7	Quarry Nomads	34	14	7	13	71	59	+12	49	
8	Old Woodstock Town	34	14	7	13	53	60	−7	49	Transferred to Division One East
9	Winterbourne United	34	13	8	13	62	52	+10	47	
10	Headington Amateurs	34	12	8	14	59	66	−7	44	
11	Harrow Hill	34	12	6	16	45	61	−16	42	
12	Kidlington	34	10	11	13	66	69	−3	41	
13	Cheltenham Saracens	34	11	8	15	47	53	−6	41	
14	Malmesbury Victoria	34	11	6	17	41	52	−11	39	
15	Cirencester United	34	8	9	17	51	66	−15	33	
16	Middle Barton	34	7	5	22	34	81	−47	26	
17	Adderbury Park	34	5	3	26	34	95	−61	18	
18	Clanfield	34	3	5	26	37	95	−58	14	

Source: fchd
Rules for classification: 1) points; 2) goal difference; 3) number of goals scored.
