= 2000–01 Hellenic Football League =

Football competition

The 2000–01 Hellenic Football League season was the 48th in the history of the Hellenic Football League, a football competition in England.

At the end of the previous season the Hellenic League merged with the Chiltonian League. 17 clubs from the latter formed Division One East, while Hellenic League Division One clubs formed Division One West.

== Premier Division ==
Hellenic Football League Premier Division
- Season: 2000–01
- Champions: Swindon Supermarine
- Promoted: Swindon Supermarine
- Relegated: Milton United
- Matches: 380
- Goals: 1,216 (3.2 per match)

The Premier Division featured 17 clubs which competed in the division last season, along with three new clubs:

- Cheltenham Saracens, promoted from Division One
- Wootton Bassett Town, promoted from Division One
- Yate Town, relegated from the Southern Football League

=== League table ===
Pos	Team	Pld	W	D	L	GF	GA	GD	Pts	Promotion or relegation
1	Swindon Supermarine	38	29	4	5	86	29	+57	91	Promoted to the Southern Football League
2	Brackley Town	38	25	8	5	84	45	+39	83	
3	Yate Town	38	21	9	8	92	37	+55	72	
4	Abingdon United	38	21	6	11	80	53	+27	69	
5	Didcot Town	38	20	12	6	57	27	+30	72	
6	North Leigh	38	20	6	12	77	51	+26	66	
7	Cirencester Academy	38	18	5	15	70	54	+16	59	
8	Highworth Town	38	19	2	17	74	68	+6	59	
9	Fairford Town	38	17	7	14	54	45	+9	58	
10	Carterton Town	38	16	9	13	64	57	+7	57	
11	Shortwood United	38	15	11	12	62	58	+4	56	
12	Tuffley Rovers	38	16	6	16	54	58	−4	54	
13	Wootton Bassett Town	38	14	10	14	54	60	−6	52	
14	Bicester Town	38	14	7	17	59	67	−8	49	
15	Pegasus Juniors	38	12	4	22	67	96	−29	40	
16	Wantage Town	38	11	4	23	48	83	−35	37	
17	Cheltenham Saracens	38	9	5	24	31	76	−45	32	
18	Harrow Hill	38	5	10	23	36	80	−44	25	
19	Almondsbury Town	38	7	3	28	36	76	−40	24	
20	Milton United	38	5	4	29	31	96	−65	19	Relegated to Division One East

Source: fchd
Rules for classification: 1) points; 2) goal difference; 3) number of goals scored.

== Division One East ==
Hellenic Football League Division One East
- Season: 2000–01
- Champions: Henley Town
- Promoted: Henley Town; Southall Town
- Matches: 272
- Goals: 1,079 (3.97 per match)

Division One East was formed by 17 clubs from the Chiltonian League, adsorbed by the Hellenic League at the end of the previous season.

=== League table ===
Pos	Team	Pld	W	D	L	GF	GA	GD	Pts	Promotion or relegation
1	Henley Town	32	25	4	3	105	33	+72	79	Promoted to the Premier Division
2	RS Basingstoke	32	17	8	7	63	37	+26	59	
3	Southall Town	32	15	10	7	63	44	+19	55	Promoted to the Premier Division
4	Quarry Nomads	32	16	7	9	66	56	+10	55	
5	Eton Wick	32	16	6	10	71	50	+21	54	
6	Rayners Lane	32	15	7	10	77	58	+19	52	
7	Finchampstead	32	14	8	10	75	58	+17	50	
8	Harrow Hill Rovers	32	15	4	13	72	71	+1	49	
9	Englefield Green Rovers	32	13	6	13	75	71	+4	45	
10	Binfield	32	13	6	13	56	55	+1	45	
11	Prestwood	32	12	9	11	60	65	−5	45	
12	Peppard	32	9	12	11	58	65	−7	39	
13	Chalfont Wasps	32	11	4	17	58	75	−17	37	
14	Martin Baker Sports	32	7	11	14	49	61	−12	32	
15	Penn & Tylers Green	32	10	2	20	47	75	−28	32	
16	Drayton Wanderers	32	7	3	22	44	90	−46	24	
17	Aston Clinton	32	3	1	28	40	115	−75	10	

Source: fchd
Rules for classification: 1) points; 2) goal difference; 3) number of goals scored.

== Division One West ==
Hellenic Football League Division One West
- Season: 2000–01
- Champions: Gloucester United
- Promoted: Gloucester United; Bishop's Cleeve
- Matches: 240
- Goals: 869 (3.62 per match)

Division One West featured 13 clubs which competed in Division One last season, along with three new clubs:

- Gloucester United
- Malmesbury Victoria, joined from the Wiltshire League
- Witney Academy

=== League table ===
Pos	Team	Pld	W	D	L	GF	GA	GD	Pts	Promotion or relegation
1	Gloucester United	30	26	3	1	119	15	+104	81	Promoted to the Premier Division
2	Bishop's Cleeve	30	22	3	5	70	36	+34	69	Promoted to the Premier Division
3	Ardley United	30	21	3	6	81	34	+47	66	
4	Malmesbury Victoria	30	15	5	10	65	59	+6	50	
5	Headington Amateurs	30	15	5	10	54	50	+4	50	
6	Easington Sports	30	12	6	12	55	61	−6	42	
7	Cirencester United	30	11	6	13	50	59	−9	39	
8	Middle Barton	30	9	11	10	45	47	−2	38	
9	Clanfield	30	8	8	14	45	58	−13	32	
10	Ross Town	30	9	6	15	48	54	−6	30 (Note: Ross Town were deducted three points.)	
11	Kidlington	30	7	9	14	39	50	−11	30	
12	Letcombe	30	7	9	14	38	61	−23	30	
13	Purton	30	7	9	14	46	73	−27	30	
14	Witney Academy	30	8	6	16	37	82	−45	30	
15	Old Woodstock Town	30	6	8	16	36	61	−25	26	
16	Worcester College Old Boys	30	5	7	18	41	69	−28	22	Resigned from the league

Source: fchd
Rules for classification: 1) points; 2) goal difference; 3) number of goals scored.
