= 2005–06 Hellenic Football League =

The 2005–06 Hellenic Football League season was the 53rd in the history of the Hellenic Football League, a football competition in England.

== Premier Division ==
Hellenic Football League Premier Division
- Season: 2005–06
- Champions: Didcot Town
- Promoted: Abingdon United; Bishop's Cleeve; Didcot Town
- Relegated: Henley Town
- Matches: 420
- Goals: 1,387 (3.3 per match)

Premier Division featured 19 clubs which competed in the division last season, along with three new clubs:

- Abingdon Town, resigned from the Isthmian League
- Kidlington, promoted from Division One West
- Shrivenham, promoted from Division One West

Also, Carterton Town changed name to Carterton.

=== League table ===
Pos	Team	Pld	W	D	L	GF	GA	GD	Pts	Promotion or relegation
1	Didcot Town	40	34	3	3	124	31	+93	105	Promoted to the Southern Football League
2	Bishop's Cleeve	40	29	5	6	108	45	+63	92	Promoted to the Southern Football League
3	Abingdon United	40	27	3	10	88	40	+48	84	Promoted to the Southern Football League
4	North Leigh	40	25	6	9	78	40	+38	81	
5	Slimbridge	40	24	6	10	90	45	+45	78	
6	Witney United	40	23	4	13	88	51	+37	73	
7	Carterton	40	23	3	14	73	51	+22	72	
8	Shrivenham	40	22	5	13	82	58	+24	71	
9	Wantage Town	40	19	7	14	73	70	+3	64	
10	Ardley United	40	18	6	16	70	63	+7	60	
11	Milton United	40	14	9	17	62	69	−7	51	
12	Highworth Town	40	13	10	17	62	72	−10	49	
13	Pegasus Juniors	40	12	11	17	53	74	−21	47	
14	Almondsbury Town	40	13	6	21	50	64	−14	45	
15	Shortwood United	40	12	6	22	55	79	−24	42	
16	Hungerford Town	40	11	8	21	31	65	−34	41	
17	Fairford Town	40	11	6	23	42	73	−31	39	
18	Abingdon Town	40	9	10	21	45	88	−43	37	
19	Chipping Norton Town	40	6	7	27	43	99	−56	25	
20	Kidlington	40	7	1	32	42	108	−66	22	
21	Henley Town	40	5	4	31	28	102	−74	19	Relegated to Division One East
22	Tuffley Rovers	0	0	0	0	0	0	0	0	Resigned to the Gloucestershire Northern Senior League, record expunged

Source: fchd
Rules for classification: 1) points; 2) goal difference; 3) number of goals scored.

== Division One East ==
Hellenic Football League Division One East
- Season: 2005–06
- Champions: Hounslow Borough
- Promoted: Hounslow Borough; Bicester Town
- Matches: 306
- Goals: 1,198 (3.92 per match)

Division One East featured 16 clubs which competed in the division last season, along with two clubs:

- Bicester Town, relegated from the Premier Division
- Quarry Nomads, transferred from Division One West, who also changed name to Oxford Quarry Nomads

Also, Bisley Sports changed name to Bisley.

=== League table ===
Pos	Team	Pld	W	D	L	GF	GA	GD	Pts	Promotion or relegation
1	Hounslow Borough	34	23	4	7	99	45	+54	73	Promoted to the Premier Division
2	Bicester Town	34	21	8	5	78	36	+42	71	Promoted to the Premier Division
3	Wokingham & Emmbrook	34	21	5	8	86	47	+39	68	
4	Chalfont Wasps	34	20	4	10	80	49	+31	64	
5	Englefield Green Rovers	34	20	4	10	73	46	+27	64	
6	Penn & Tylers Green	34	20	4	10	69	46	+23	64	
7	Bisley	34	19	5	10	81	51	+30	62	
8	Binfield	34	19	2	13	70	44	+26	59	
9	Kintbury Rangers	34	18	4	12	81	48	+33	58	
10	Eton Wick	34	17	5	12	73	64	+9	56	
11	Oxford Quarry Nomads	34	14	4	16	67	81	−14	46	
12	Badshot Lea	34	13	6	15	81	74	+7	45	
13	Finchampstead	34	10	7	17	58	60	−2	37	
14	Holyport	34	10	4	20	58	90	−32	34	
15	Rayners Lane	34	11	1	22	57	90	−33	34	
16	Chinnor	34	5	5	24	34	82	−48	20	
17	Banbury United reserves	34	4	4	26	29	108	−79	16	Transferred to Division One West
18	Prestwood	34	1	4	29	24	137	−113	7	

Source: fchd
Rules for classification: 1) points; 2) goal difference; 3) number of goals scored.

== Division One West ==
Hellenic Football League Division One West
- Season: 2005–06
- Champions: Winterbourne United
- Promoted: Harrow Hill
- Matches: 306
- Goals: 982 (3.21 per match)

Division One West featured 14 clubs which competed in the division last season, along with five new clubs:

- Cricklade Town, joined from the Wiltshire League
- Letcombe, transferred from Division One East
- Old Woodstock Town, transferred from Division One East
- Pewsey Vale, relegated from the Premier Division
- Wootton Bassett Town, relegated from the Premier Division

=== League table ===
Pos	Team	Pld	W	D	L	GF	GA	GD	Pts	Promotion or relegation
1	Winterbourne United	34	24	5	5	98	36	+62	77	
2	Harrow Hill	34	18	9	7	61	40	+21	63	Promoted to the Premier Division
3	Tytherington Rocks	34	19	5	10	79	54	+25	62	
4	Headington Amateurs	34	18	8	8	59	39	+20	62	Transferred to Division One East
5	Wootton Bassett Town	34	17	10	7	58	30	+28	61	
6	Trowbridge Town	34	17	9	8	65	44	+21	60	
7	Old Woodstock Town	34	16	8	10	55	46	+9	56	
8	Cheltenham Saracens	34	14	12	8	54	40	+14	54	
9	Letcombe	34	14	6	14	51	45	+6	48	
10	Pewsey Vale	34	13	7	14	54	51	+3	46	
11	Hook Norton	34	13	7	14	57	58	−1	46	
12	Cricklade Town	34	13	5	16	55	67	−12	44	
13	Malmesbury Victoria	34	11	9	14	50	56	−6	42	
14	Cirencester United	34	11	5	18	50	64	−14	38	
15	Purton	34	7	9	18	33	64	−31	27 (Note: Purton were deducted three points.)	
16	Easington Sports	34	6	9	19	37	71	−34	27	
17	Clanfield	34	5	4	25	30	74	−44	19	
18	Ross Town	34	5	3	26	36	103	−67	18	
19	Middle Barton	0	0	0	0	0	0	0	0	Resigned to the Oxfordshire Senior League, record expunged

Source: fchd
Rules for classification: 1) points; 2) goal difference; 3) number of goals scored.
