= 1996–97 Hellenic Football League =

The 1996–97 Hellenic Football League season was the 44th in the history of the Hellenic Football League, a football competition in England.

== Premier Division ==
Hellenic Football League Premier Division
- Season: 1996–97
- Champions: Brackley Town
- Promoted: Brackley Town
- Matches: 306
- Goals: 913 (2.98 per match)

The Premier Division featured 17 clubs which competed in the division last season, along with one new club:

- Wantage Town, promoted from Division One

=== League table ===
Pos	Team	Pld	W	D	L	GF	GA	GD	Pts	Promotion or relegation
1	Brackley Town	34	25	6	3	79	20	+59	81	Promoted to the Southern Football League
2	Abingdon United	34	22	5	7	57	32	+25	71	
3	Burnham	34	20	9	5	67	34	+33	69	
4	Swindon Supermarine	34	21	5	8	72	40	+32	68	
5	North Leigh	34	17	7	10	56	39	+17	58	
6	Tuffley Rovers	34	16	8	10	62	43	+19	56	
7	Endsleigh	34	13	11	10	49	50	−1	50	
8	Banbury United	34	14	5	15	51	46	+5	47	
9	Didcot Town	34	13	7	14	42	52	−10	46	
10	Carterton Town	34	12	5	17	57	57	0	41	
11	Shortwood United	34	11	6	17	53	60	−7	39	
12	Lambourn Sports	34	10	8	16	44	53	−9	38	Resigned to the North Berks League
13	Bicester Town	34	10	7	17	31	53	−22	37	
14	Wantage Town	34	11	4	19	36	69	−33	37	
15	Almondsbury Town	34	8	10	16	44	52	−8	34	
16	Kintbury Rangers	34	9	5	20	41	67	−26	32	
17	Highworth Town	34	8	5	21	40	73	−33	29	
18	Fairford Town	34	7	5	22	32	73	−41	26	

Source: fchd
Rules for classification: 1) points; 2) goal difference; 3) number of goals scored.

== Division One ==
Hellenic Football League Division One
- Season: 1996–97
- Champions: Ardley United
- Promoted: Hallen; Harrow Hill
- Matches: 272
- Goals: 897 (3.3 per match)

Division One featured 16 clubs which competed in the division last season, along with one new club:

- Ross Town

=== League table ===
Pos	Team	Pld	W	D	L	GF	GA	GD	Pts	Promotion or relegation
1	Ardley United	32	24	7	1	76	21	+55	79	
2	Hallen	32	21	8	3	79	23	+56	71	Promoted to the Premier Division
3	Harrow Hill	32	20	7	5	56	29	+27	67	Promoted to the Premier Division
4	Cheltenham Saracens	32	20	5	7	75	47	+28	65	
5	Purton	32	19	5	8	75	36	+39	62	
6	Kidlington	32	19	4	9	64	33	+31	61	
7	Pegasus Juniors	32	18	4	10	61	29	+32	58	
8	Headington Amateurs	32	14	6	12	49	47	+2	48	
9	Ross Town	32	13	7	12	56	47	+9	46	
10	Cirencester United	32	12	4	16	51	56	−5	40	
11	Wootton Bassett Town	32	9	8	15	37	50	−13	35	
12	Clanfield	32	9	3	20	46	64	−18	30	
13	Bishop's Cleeve	32	7	9	16	39	66	−27	30	
14	Yarnton	32	9	3	20	31	68	−37	30	
15	Easington Sports	32	5	5	22	34	78	−44	20	
16	Letcombe	32	4	4	24	26	97	−71	16	
17	Milton United	32	2	5	25	42	106	−64	11	

Source: fchd
Rules for classification: 1) points; 2) goal difference; 3) number of goals scored.
