= 1999–2000 Hellenic Football League =

The 1999–2000 Hellenic Football League season was the 47th in the history of the Hellenic Football League, a football competition in England.

At the end of the season the Hellenic League merged with the Chiltonian League. 17 clubs from the latter formed Division One East, while Hellenic League Division One clubs formed Division One West.

== Premier Division ==
Hellenic Football League Premier Division
- Season: 1999–2000
- Champions: Banbury United
- Promoted: Banbury United
- Matches: 342
- Goals: 1,091 (3.19 per match)

The Premier Division featured 16 clubs which competed in the division last season, along with three new clubs:

- Brackley Town, relegated from the Southern Football League
- Milton United, promoted from Division One
- Pegasus Juniors, promoted from Division One

=== League table ===
Pos	Team	Pld	W	D	L	GF	GA	GD	Pts	Promotion or relegation
1	Banbury United	36	29	5	2	87	22	+65	92	Promoted to the Southern Football League
2	Highworth Town	36	25	4	7	90	54	+36	79	
3	Swindon Supermarine	36	23	4	9	74	27	+47	73	
4	Tuffley Rovers	36	22	4	10	76	44	+32	70	
5	Brackley Town	36	21	6	9	66	32	+34	69	
6	North Leigh	36	19	7	10	81	53	+28	64	
7	Didcot Town	36	17	10	9	61	50	+11	61	
8	Abingdon United	36	17	6	13	58	55	+3	57	
9	Carterton Town	36	15	6	15	47	50	−3	51	
10	Pegasus Juniors	36	15	5	16	62	61	+1	50	
11	Shortwood United	36	13	10	13	54	55	−1	49	
12	Wantage Town	36	15	4	17	50	64	−14	49	
13	Hallen	36	13	7	16	55	60	−5	40 (Note: Hallen were deducted six points.)	Demoted to Western League First Division
14	Cirencester Academy	36	10	6	20	34	53	−19	36	
15	Bicester Town	36	9	5	22	42	73	−31	32	
16	Fairford Town	36	7	8	21	32	69	−37	29	
17	Almondsbury Town	36	7	5	24	42	83	−41	26	
18	Harrow Hill	36	7	1	28	44	96	−52	22	
19	Milton United	36	3	7	26	36	90	−54	16	

Source: fchd
Rules for classification: 1) points; 2) goal difference; 3) number of goals scored.

== Division One ==
Hellenic Football League Division One
- Season: 1999–2000
- Champions: Cheltenham Saracens
- Promoted: Cheltenham Saracens; Wootton Bassett Town
- Matches: 210
- Goals: 684 (3.26 per match)

Division One featured 13 clubs which competed in Division One last season, along with two new clubs, joined from the Oxfordshire Senior League:

- Middle Barton
- Old Woodstock Town

=== League table ===
Pos	Team	Pld	W	D	L	GF	GA	GD	Pts	Promotion or relegation
1	Cheltenham Saracens	28	23	2	3	61	20	+41	71	Promoted to the Premier Division
2	Ardley United	28	16	6	6	63	38	+25	54	
3	Wootton Bassett Town	28	15	7	6	54	32	+22	52	Promoted to the Premier Division
4	Worcester College Old Boys	28	13	6	9	53	46	+7	45	
5	Bishop's Cleeve	28	12	8	8	44	43	+1	44	
6	Middle Barton	28	12	5	11	49	45	+4	41	
7	Letcombe	28	11	5	12	57	45	+12	38	
8	Easington Sports	28	10	6	12	50	58	−8	36	
9	Purton	28	10	4	14	42	56	−14	34	
10	Ross Town	28	8	8	12	32	32	0	32	
11	Old Woodstock Town	28	8	8	12	43	51	−8	32	
12	Kidlington	28	9	5	14	36	50	−14	32	
13	Cirencester United	28	10	1	17	38	50	−12	31	
14	Clanfield	28	6	6	16	33	58	−25	24	
15	Headington Amateurs	28	6	5	17	29	60	−31	23	

Source: fchd
Rules for classification: 1) points; 2) goal difference; 3) number of goals scored.
