= 1997–98 Hellenic Football League =

The 1997–98 Hellenic Football League season was the 45th in the history of the Hellenic Football League, a football competition in England.

== Premier Division ==
Hellenic Football League Premier Division
- Season: 1997–98
- Champions: Swindon Supermarine
- Matches: 306
- Goals: 969 (3.17 per match)

The Premier Division featured 16 clubs which competed in the division last season, along with two new clubs, promoted from Division One:

- Hallen
- Harrow Hill

=== League table ===
| Pos | Team | Pld | W | D | L | GF | GA | GD | Pts |
|---|---|---|---|---|---|---|---|---|---|
| 1 | Swindon Supermarine | 34 | 27 | 3 | 4 | 83 | 20 | +63 | 84 |
| 2 | Endsleigh | 34 | 26 | 4 | 4 | 75 | 24 | +51 | 82 |
| 3 | Burnham | 34 | 18 | 10 | 6 | 65 | 35 | +30 | 64 |
| 4 | Banbury United | 34 | 17 | 7 | 10 | 69 | 42 | +27 | 58 |
| 5 | Almondsbury Town | 34 | 17 | 4 | 13 | 51 | 37 | +14 | 55 |
| 6 | Tuffley Rovers | 34 | 16 | 7 | 11 | 57 | 49 | +8 | 55 |
| 7 | Highworth Town | 34 | 14 | 7 | 13 | 52 | 56 | −4 | 49 |
| 8 | North Leigh | 34 | 13 | 8 | 13 | 51 | 46 | +5 | 47 |
| 9 | Fairford Town | 34 | 13 | 8 | 13 | 54 | 53 | +1 | 47 |
| 10 | Abingdon United | 34 | 12 | 10 | 12 | 60 | 57 | +3 | 46 |
| 11 | Wantage Town | 34 | 12 | 4 | 18 | 45 | 72 | −27 | 40 |
| 12 | Didcot Town | 34 | 9 | 12 | 13 | 48 | 49 | −1 | 39 |
| 13 | Carterton Town | 34 | 9 | 10 | 15 | 50 | 57 | −7 | 37 |
| 14 | Shortwood United | 34 | 10 | 6 | 18 | 57 | 78 | −21 | 36 |
| 15 | Hallen | 34 | 9 | 6 | 19 | 39 | 57 | −18 | 33 |
| 16 | Harrow Hill | 34 | 8 | 7 | 19 | 38 | 70 | −32 | 31 |
| 17 | Bicester Town | 34 | 7 | 8 | 19 | 43 | 73 | −30 | 29 |
| 18 | Kintbury Rangers | 34 | 6 | 5 | 23 | 32 | 94 | −62 | 20 (Note: Kintbury Rangers were deducted three points.) |

Source: fchd
Rules for classification: 1) points; 2) goal difference; 3) number of goals scored.

== Division One ==
Hellenic Football League Division One
- Season: 1997–98
- Champions: Ardley United
- Promoted: Cirencester Academy
- Matches: 272
- Goals: 980 (3.6 per match)

Division One featured 15 clubs which competed in the division last season, along with two new clubs:

- Cirencester Academy
- Watlington

=== League table ===
| Pos | Team | Pld | W | D | L | GF | GA | GD | Pts | Promotion or relegation |
|---|---|---|---|---|---|---|---|---|---|---|
| 1 | Ardley United | 32 | 23 | 5 | 4 | 104 | 36 | +68 | 74 | |
| 2 | Cirencester Academy | 32 | 21 | 9 | 2 | 66 | 22 | +44 | 69 (Note: Cirencester Academy were deducted three points.) | Promoted to the Premier Division |
| 3 | Cheltenham Saracens | 32 | 21 | 6 | 5 | 71 | 41 | +30 | 69 | |
| 4 | Purton | 32 | 18 | 6 | 8 | 71 | 44 | +27 | 60 | |
| 5 | Kidlington | 32 | 16 | 8 | 8 | 71 | 49 | +22 | 56 | |
| 6 | Easington Sports | 32 | 15 | 5 | 12 | 60 | 56 | +4 | 50 | |
| 7 | Pegasus Juniors | 32 | 14 | 6 | 12 | 62 | 50 | +12 | 48 | |
| 8 | Clanfield | 32 | 14 | 5 | 13 | 64 | 56 | +8 | 47 | |
| 9 | Ross Town | 32 | 13 | 6 | 13 | 56 | 57 | −1 | 45 | |
| 10 | Wootton Bassett Town | 32 | 12 | 6 | 14 | 67 | 58 | +9 | 42 | |
| 11 | Cirencester United | 32 | 11 | 7 | 14 | 51 | 57 | −6 | 40 | |
| 12 | Bishop's Cleeve | 32 | 12 | 3 | 17 | 42 | 63 | −21 | 39 | |
| 13 | Watlington | 32 | 11 | 3 | 18 | 42 | 59 | −17 | 36 | |
| 14 | Headington Amateurs | 32 | 9 | 7 | 16 | 47 | 56 | −9 | 34 | |
| 15 | Letcombe | 32 | 8 | 3 | 21 | 40 | 82 | −42 | 27 | |
| 16 | Milton United | 32 | 6 | 4 | 22 | 37 | 82 | −45 | 22 | |
| 17 | Yarnton | 32 | 2 | 3 | 27 | 29 | 112 | −83 | 9 | Resigned from the league |

Source: fchd
Rules for classification: 1) points; 2) goal difference; 3) number of goals scored.
