= Stuart Beavon (footballer, born 1984) =

English footballer

Personal information
- Full name: Stuart Leigh Beavon
- Date of birth: 5 May 1984 (age 42)
- Place of birth: Reading, England
- Height: 5 ft 7 in (1.70 m)
- Position: Forward

Team information
- Current team: Mickleover

Senior career*
Years	Team	Apps	(Gls)
2001–2003	Ardley United^{[A]}	37	(35)
2003–2004	AFC Wallingford		
2004–2007	Didcot Town	92	(63)
2007–2009	Weymouth	86	(24)
2009	→ Wycombe Wanderers (loan)	8	(0)
2009–2012	Wycombe Wanderers	107	(28)
2012–2014	Preston North End	58	(9)
2014	→ Burton Albion (loan)	5	(1)
2014–2017	Burton Albion	92	(12)
2017–2019	Coventry City	28	(2)
2018–2019	→ Wrexham (loan)	40	(5)
2019–2020	Nuneaton Borough	7	(0)
2019–2020	→ Mickleover Sports (loan)	16	(8)
2020–	Mickleover (Note: The club was called Mickleover Sports until June 2020)	92	(28)
- * Club domestic league appearances and goals as of 00:01, 1 July 2023 (UTC)

Stuart Leigh Beavon (born 5 May 1984) is an English professional footballer who plays as a forward for Northern Premier League Division One Midlands club Mickleover.

== Career ==
=== Early career ===
Born in Reading, Berkshire, Beavon started his career playing Hellenic League football for Ardley United in 2001 as a 17-year-old, where he was later joined by his father Stuart Beavon. He transferred to Combined Counties side AFC Wallingford in August 2003.

=== Didcot Town ===
Beavon, along with two other Wallingford teammates, transferred to local rivals Didcot Town for the start of the 2004–05 season. It was during his time with the Railwaymen that he began to attract the attention of numerous professional clubs. He scored two goals in Didcot's FA Vase triumph at White Hart Lane against AFC Sudbury in May 2005. He scored 25 league goals the following season as Didcot lifted the Hellenic League Premier Division title.

=== Weymouth ===
His fine form continued in the Southern League South & West Division, and in January 2007 he was signed by Conference National team Weymouth on a free transfer.

=== Wycombe Wanderers ===
Beavon signed for League Two team Wycombe Wanderers on loan until the end of the 2008–09 season on 19 February 2009, with the option of him signing permanently at the end of the season. Wycombe took this option up after their promotion to League One, and Beavon scored his first goal for the club in his first league start as part of a 1–1 away draw with Hartlepool United. He then proceeded to score a further 2 goals making 14 starts and 11 substitute appearances in a season that ultimately ended in relegation for Wycombe. His contract was extended by for a further year and played a key role in Wycombe's promotion in the 2010–11 season, by supporting top goal-scorer Scott Rendell.

Again his contract was renewed and he was the only player to be offered a two-year deal seeing him through to the end of the 2012–13 season. After a slow start to the season, scoring a hat-trick in the Football League Trophy but none in the league he gathered goalscoring momentum with his first league goal in a 1–0 win over Sheffield United. This was part of a run of four goals in seven games. He then took another month to get his next goal however managed to score three in two against Milton Keynes Dons and Chesterfield. Two goals against Rochdale took him to nine league goals for the season. After another three games without a goal he scored his 10th of the season against Yeovil Town before notching his 11th and 12th in a 5–0 win over Hartlepool United. He eventually finished the season with 21 league goals, putting him fourth in the League One top goalscorers table (despite the fact he played for a side which was relegated).

He scored his final goal for Wycombe Wanderers on 18 August 2012, in a 3–1 victory away at York City.

=== Preston North End ===
During the summer, there was much transfer speculation about a possible move to Preston North End for Beavon. When the season began, interest in the striker died down slightly because Wycombe felt their valuation of the player was not being met by Preston's offers. Westley finally succeeded in signing Beavon on 31 August 2012 (transfer deadline day) and Beavon agreed a two-year contract.

He made an instant impact at the club by scoring in his first match for Preston, a 4–1 win over Swindon Town. On 17 December 2013, Beavon extended his contract with Preston for a further twelve months, thus keeping him at the club until the summer of 2015.

=== Burton Albion ===
On 30 June 2014, Beavon joined Burton Albion in League Two, initially on a season-long loan, which subsequently became a permanent deal on transfer deadline day.

=== Coventry City ===
On 1 January 2017, Beavon joined Coventry City as part of the deal that saw Marvin Sordell go in the other direction. He made his debut for the club a day later and scored Coventry's second goal in a 2–2 draw with Bolton Wanderers. His second goal for the club was an important one as it was the first in a 2–1 win against Wycombe Wanderers in the EFL Trophy Semi Final. This win sent Coventry to their first Wembley final in 30 years.

On 27 July 2018 Beavon joined Wrexham on a season long loan. He was released by Coventry following the announcement of their retained list on 9 May 2019.

=== Return to non-league ===
On 12 June 2019, Beavon signed for Nuneaton Borough. On 21 September, he joined Mickleover Sports on a season-long loan deal. He signed a permanent deal with the club in January 2020.

== Personal life ==
He is the son of former Reading midfielder Stuart Beavon, and grandson of former Oxford United defender Cyril Beavon.

== Career statistics ==
As of match played 17 April 2023

Appearances and goals by club, season and competition
Club	Season	League			FA Cup		League Cup		Other		Total	
Club	Season	Division	Apps	Goals	Apps	Goals	Apps	Goals	Apps	Goals	Apps	Goals
Ardley United	2002–03	Hellenic League Division One West	37	35	—		—		3 (Note: Appearances in Hellenic League Challenge Cup)	4	40	39
Didcot Town	2004–05	Hellenic League Premier Division	34	17	3	2	—		15 (Note: Ten appearances eight goals in FA Vase, four appearances four goals in Hellenic League Challenge Cup, one appearance in Berks & Bucks Senior Trophy)	12	52	31
Didcot Town	2005–06	Hellenic League Premier Division	36	25	6	5	—		11 (Note: Three appearances three goals in FA Vase, five appearances five goals in Hellenic League Challenge Cup, three appearances two goals in Berks & Bucks Senior Trophy)	10	53	40
Didcot Town	2006–07	Southern League Division One South & West	22	21	4	4	—		8 (Note: Four appearances five goals in FA Trophy, three appearances four goals in Southern League Cup, one appearance two goals in Berks & Bucks Senior Cup)	11	34	36
Didcot Town	Total		92	63	13	11	—		34	33	139	107
Weymouth	2006–07	Conference National	20	7	0	0	—		0	0	20	7
Weymouth	2007–08	Conference Premier	39	3	2	3	—		2 (Note: One appearance in FA Trophy, one appearance in Conference League Cup)	0	43	6
Weymouth	2008–09	Conference Premier	27	14	0	0	—		0	0	27	14
Weymouth	Total		86	24	2	3	—		2	0	90	27
Wycombe Wanderers	2008–09 (Note: This season was spent on loan from Weymouth)	League Two	8	0	0	0	0	0	0	0	8	0
Wycombe Wanderers	2009–10	League One	25	3	1	0	1	0	0	0	27	3
Wycombe Wanderers	2010–11	League Two	37	3	3	2	0	0	2 (Note: Appearances in Football League Trophy)	0	42	5
Wycombe Wanderers	2011–12	League One	43	21	0	0	1	1	1	3	45	25
Wycombe Wanderers	2012–13	League Two	2	1	0	0	1	0	0	0	3	1
Wycombe Wanderers	Total		115	28	4	2	3	1	3	3	125	34
Preston North End	2012–13	League One	31	6	3	1	1	0	2	2	37	9
Preston North End	2013–14	League One	27	3	2	0	1	0	2 (Note: One appearance in Football League Trophy, one appearance in League One play-offs)	0	32	3
Preston North End	Total		58	9	5	1	2	0	4	2	69	12
Burton Albion	2014–15 (Note: Part of this season was spent on loan from Preston North End)	League Two	44	6	1	0	1	1	0	0	46	7
Burton Albion	2015–16	League One	43	7	1	0	0	0	0	0	44	7
Burton Albion	2016–17	Championship	10	0	0	0	2	1	—		12	1
Burton Albion	Total		97	13	2	0	3	2	0	0	102	15
Coventry City	2016–17	League One	14	2	0	0	0	0	3	1	17	3
Coventry City	2017–18	League Two	14	0	0	0	1	0	3	0	18	0
Coventry City	2018–19	League One	0	0	0	0	0	0	0	0	0	0
Coventry City	Total		28	2	0	0	1	0	6	1	35	3
Wrexham (loan)	2018–19	National League	40	5	5	1	—		1 (Note: Appearances in National League play-offs)	0	46	6
Nuneaton Borough	2019–20	Southern League Premier Division Central	7	0	1	0	—		0	0	8	0
Mickleover	2019–20 (Note: Part of this season was spent on loan from Nuneaton Borough)	Northern Premier League Premier Division	22	10	0	0	—		3 (Note: One appearance in FA Trophy, one appearance in Northern Premier League Challenge Cup, one appearance in Derbyshire Senior Cup)	0	25	10
Mickleover	2020–21	Northern Premier League Premier Division	10	4	3	2	—		2 (Note: Appearances in FA Trophy)	2	15	8
Mickleover	2021–22	Northern Premier League Premier Division	37	10	2	0	—		1	0	40	10
Mickleover	2022–23	Southern League Premier Division Central	39	12	1	0	—		1	0	41	12
Mickleover	Total		108	36	6	2	—		7	2	121	40
Career total			668	215	38	20	9	3	60	45	775	283

== Honours ==
Didcot Town

- Hellenic League Premier Division: 2005–06
- FA Vase: 2004–05
- Hellenic League Challenge Cup: 2004–05, 2005–06
- Berks & Bucks Senior Trophy: 2005–06

Wycombe Wanderers

- Football League Two promotion: 2010–11

Burton Albion

- Football League One runner-up: 2015–16
- Football League Two: 2014–15

Coventry City

- EFL Trophy: 2016–17

Individual

- Hellenic League Division One West Top Goalscorer: 2002–03
- Wycombe Wanderers Player of the Year: 2011–12
- Burton Albion Player of the Year: 2014–15, 2015–16

== Notes ==
A. The Ardley United appearances and goals do not include the 2001–02 season.
