= Adam Bailey =

English footballer

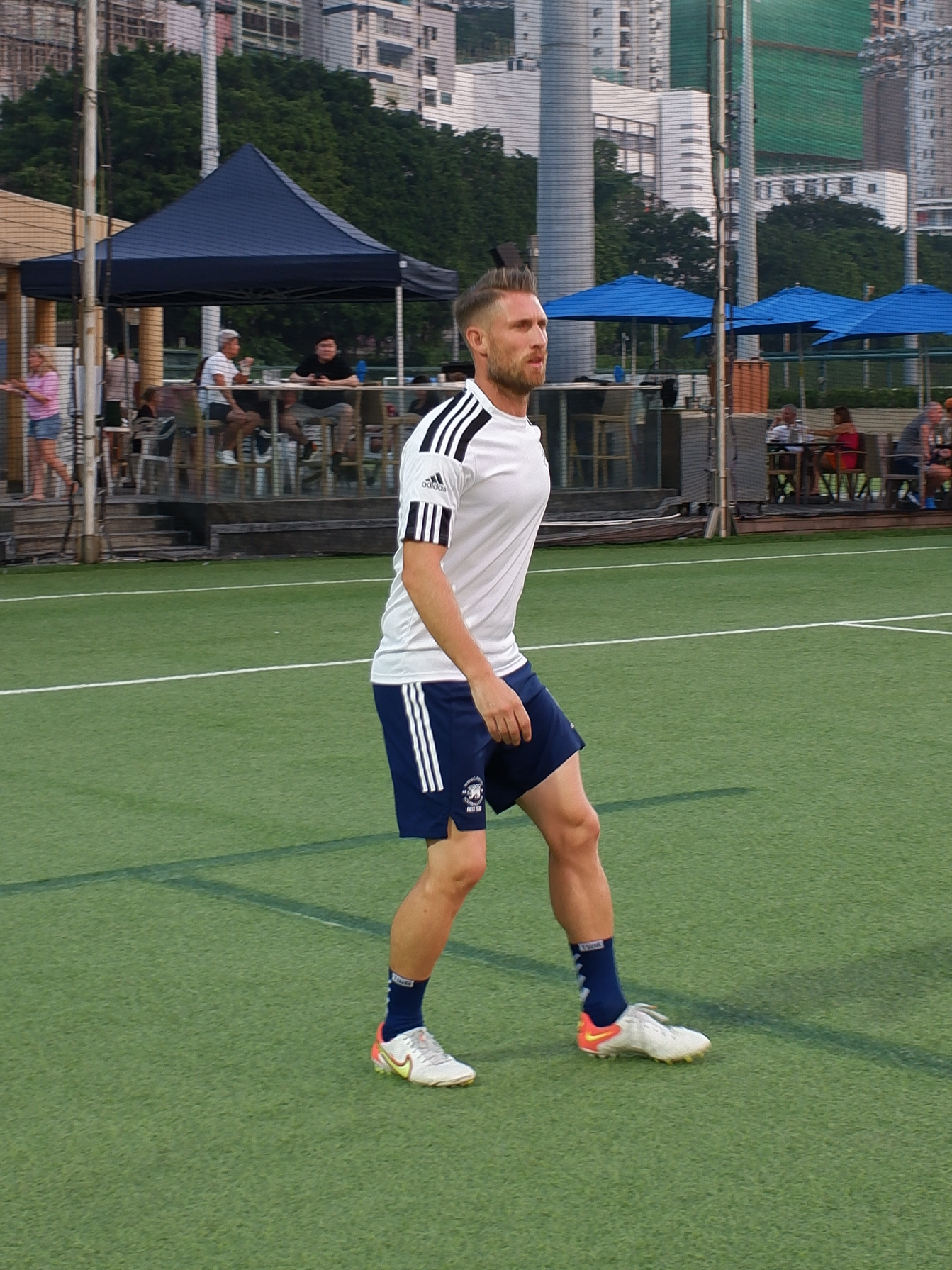

Personal information
- Full name: Adam Donald Bailey
- Date of birth: 13 January 1988 (age 38)
- Place of birth: England
- Position: Midfielder

Youth career
- 1999–2000: Reading
- 2003–2005: Stoke City

Senior career*
Years	Team	Apps	(Gls)
2006–2007	Banbury United	14	(5)
2013–2015	Lucky Mile	41	(13)
2015–2016	HKFC	18	(4)
2016	Double Flower	9	(3)
2017	Wanchai	10	(2)
2017–2023	HKFC	60	(5)
- * Club domestic league appearances and goals

Adam Donald Bailey (born 13 January 1988) is an English former professional footballer who played as a midfielder.

Adam also played at the conference level in the UK as well as representing Stoke City U16's.

== Coaching career ==
As well as playing football, Adam Bailey is the director & founder of Vikings FC, a football club in Hong Kong.

Adam is a UEFA C licensed coach

== Career statistics ==
=== Club ===
As of 2 December 2021

Appearances and goals by club, season and competition
Club	Season	League			Cup		League Cup		Total	
Club	Season	Division	Apps	Goals	Apps	Goals	Apps	Goals	Apps	Goals
Didcot Town	2004–05	Hellenic Football League	8	2	4	2	2	0	14	4
Didcot Town	2005–06	Hellenic Football League	16	4	5	1	4	1	25	6
Banbury United	2006–07	Conference South	11	3	3	2	0	0	14	5
Milton United	2007–08	Hellenic Football League	24	12	10	4	6	3	40	19
Thatcham Town	2008–09	Southern Football League	12	4	6	1	6	0	24	5
Lucky Mile	2013–14	First Division	15	4	0	0	0	0	15	4
Lucky Mile	2014–15	First Division	26	9	0	0	0	0	26	9
HKFC	2015–16	First Division	18	4	0	0	0	0	18	4
Double Flower	2016–17	First Division	9	3	0	0	0	0	9	3
Wanchai	2016–17	First Division	10	2	0	0	0	0	10	2
HKFC	2017–18	First Division	17	2	0	0	0	0	17	2
HKFC	2018–19	First Division	12	1	0	0	0	0	12	1
HKFC	2019–20	First Division	7	1	0	0	0	0	7	1
HKFC	2020–21	First Division	3	0	0	0	0	0	3	0
HKFC	2021–22	Premier League	1	0	1 (Note: Appearances in the Hong Kong FA Cup)	0	0	0	2	0
HKFC	2022–23	Premier League	3	0	4	1	2	0	9	1
Career total			192	51	33	11	20	4	245	66
