= Witney Town F.C. =

Coordinates: 51°47′14″N 1°31′36″W

Witney Town
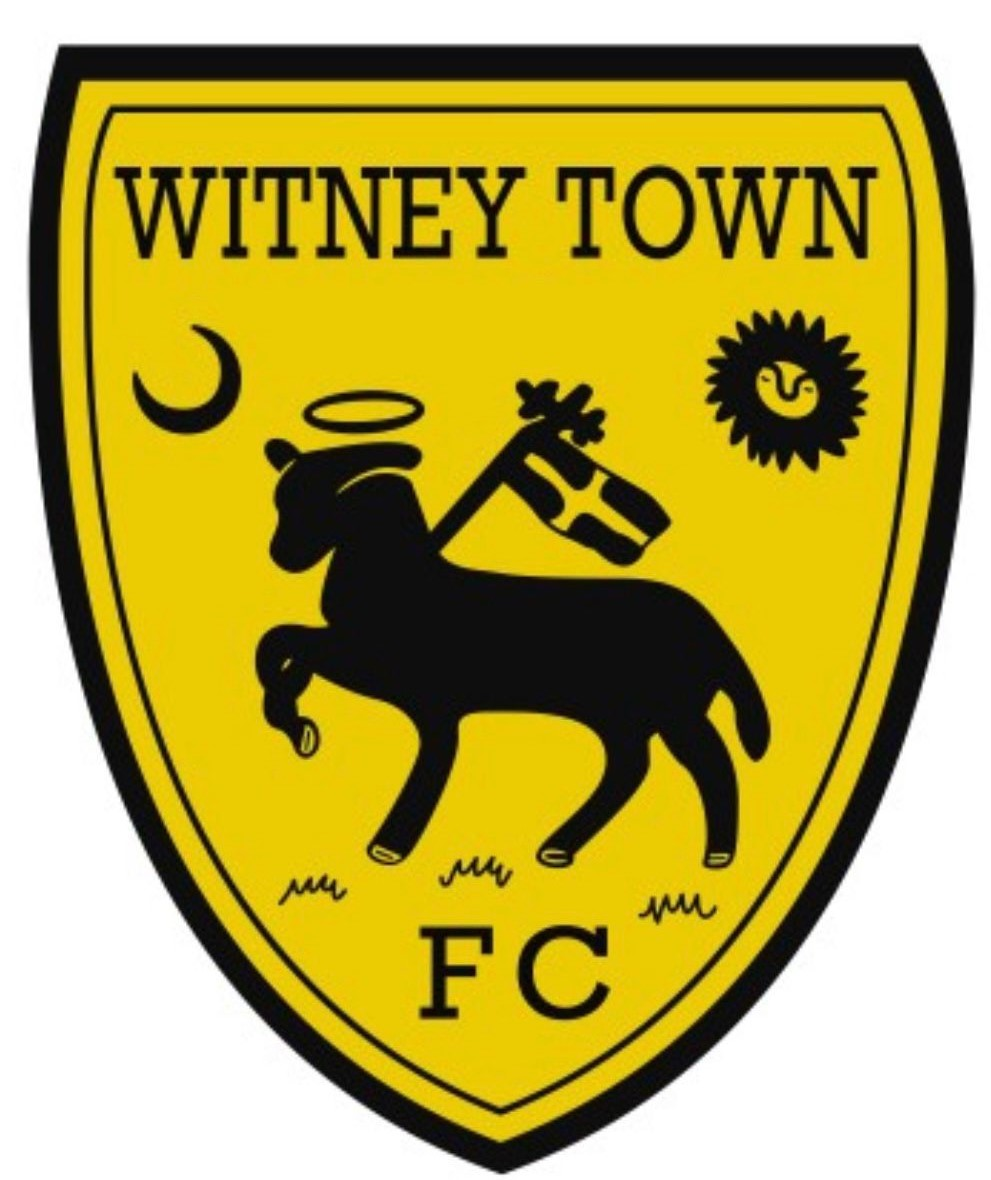
- Witney Town Badge, 2024 onwards
- Full name: Witney Town Football Club
- Nickname: The Blanketmen
- Founded: 1885
- Ground: Eynsham Park, Witney, Oxon OX29 6SL
- Chairman: Paul Foster
- Manager: Shaun Wimble
- League: Oxfordshire Senior League Premier Division
- 2025–26: Oxfordshire Senior League Division One, 1st of 14 (promoted)

Witney Town F.C. (known at various times as Witney F.C., Witney United F.C. and Witney Town A.F.C.) is a football club in Witney, Oxfordshire. The club was founded in 1885 (as Witney Football Club) and adopted the name Witney Town in 1922. The club's most successful period was in the 1970s and 80s when they competed in the Southern League Premier Division, finishing 5th in 1983–84. The club folded in 2001, but a phoenix club arose under the name Witney United in 2002 and obtained the lease of the former club's ground. The club readopted the Witney Town name in 2011, but was dissolved during the 2012–13 season while playing in the Hellenic League Premier Division.

Witney Town re-formed for the 2024–25 season, and won the title of the Oxfordshire Senior League Division Two. They competed in Division One for the 2025–26 season. Having won the Division One title, they competed in the Premier Division for the 2026–27 season.

== History ==
=== 1885–1922: Early years as Witney F.C. ===
The club was founded in 1885 as Witney Football Club and within 15 years of their formation had won the Oxfordshire Senior Cup three times. Herbert Smith, a successful full-back who moved to Oxford City, later played for Derby County and Stoke City, appeared four times for the England national football team in 1905 and 1906, and helped win a gold medal for his country as a left-back at the 1908 Summer Olympics.

=== 1922–1973: Witney Town F.C. in the Oxfordshire Senior and Hellenic Leagues ===
The club re-formed as Witney Town in 1922, playing in the Oxfordshire Senior League and finishing as champions five times. Frank Clack, a goalkeeper from this era, went on to play for Birmingham City and Bristol City in the 1930s and 40s.

In 1953 they were founder members of the Hellenic League, winning the league in the 1954–55 season, its second year. They topped the Premier Division for three successive seasons in the 1960s (1965–67) and repeated the feat the following decade (1971–73).

=== 1973–1987: Southern League success ===
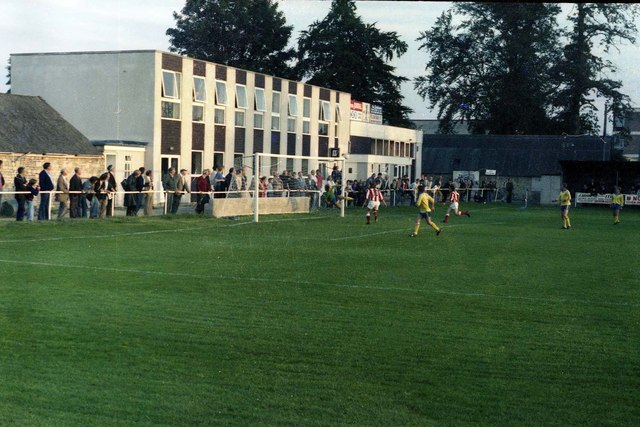
Witney Town in action in 1980

After twenty years of success at Hellenic League level, they applied for membership of the Southern League and were admitted at the first attempt to Division One North. Their first season at this level was in 1973–74, and they won the league in 1977–78 and were promoted to the Premier Division. At the end of their first season (in which they finished 10th), the league was reorganised and Witney were placed in the Midland Section of the Southern League for 1979–80. Another reorganisation placed them in the Premier Division for season 1982–83, where they remained for six seasons (with reprieves from relegation in 1984–85 when Hastings United folded, and in 1985–86 when the league was expanded). Their highest finish was 5th place in 1983–84.

On 21st February 1979, Trevor Francis, Britain's first £1m player, made his first appearance for his new club Nottingham Forest in a testimonial held at Witney Town's ground for then Witney Town captain Trevor Stokes, a match arranged by Ron Atkinson, the then-manager of West Bromwich Albion, who had coached at Witney during the 1970s.

=== 1988–2001: Relegation and closure ===
They suffered the first relegation in their history, to the Southern League South Division, at the end of the 1987–88 season. In 1992, the club moved from Marriotts Close to a purpose-built stadium near Curbridge, initially named Oakey Park after a former chairman, Aubrey Oakey, and later renamed the Marriotts Stadium after the family who sold the old ground to the club.

Witney Town were to remain in the second tier of the Southern League until their demise 13 seasons later (although the Northern and Southern divisions were renamed Eastern and Western in 1999–2000). During this period they survived a winding-up petition and were converted to a limited company in 1993, and local businessman Brian Constable was appointed as chief executive. They finished no higher than 3rd, through they narrowly missed out on promotion in 1993–94 (losing the final match of the season 2–1 to Sudbury Town, who thereby pipped them to second place and promotion to the Premier Division) and won the Oxfordshire Senior Cup three times in the 1990s (in 1994, 1995 and 1998). Brendan Rodgers, later manager of Liverpool, spent two months on loan at Witney as a player in 1994–95. Witney finished 14th in the Southern League Eastern Division in 2000–01. In the close season, chairman/owner Brian Constable folded the club, amid protests from a supporters' group known as 1885 who claimed that credible bids to buy the club were dismissed.

=== 2001–2012: Rebirth as Witney United ===
Club badge from 2011

The club was reformed as Witney United F.C. by a group of Witney Town supporters. The Witney United name was registered with the Oxfordshire Football Association in 2001, with the aim of returning to Southern League football within five seasons. In 2002 the club obtained a lease on the original Witney Town stadium and were accepted into Division One (West) of the Hellenic League for the 2002–03 season. In its first year the club finished 15th of 20 in the division, but in 2003–04 they finished 5th and, with Ardley United (4th), were promoted to the Premier Division, ahead of the teams in the top three.

The club finished 11th in the Premier Division in 2004–05 and finished in the top 10 for the next five seasons. The 2010–11 season saw a decline in their fortunes, and they finished 18th, one place above the relegation places. In 2011–12 the club, now under its former name of Witney Town, finished in 19th place; only the forced demotion of Henley Town (whose ground did not meet league requirements) kept them in the division.

=== 2013: Liquidation ===
The club was evicted from their stadium in February 2013 because they were unable to pay the rent. A plan to groundshare with Carterton F.C. fell through, and following lengthy discussions between the Hellenic League and the club's trustees, no persons came forward to offer their services to take over responsibility as officers and the club's resignation was tendered. The club then liquidated and folded.

=== 2024–present ===
In March 2024 Witney Town confirmed that they would be playing again from the 2024–25 season. The idea to resurrect the club was fronted by new chairman Paul Foster, who installed Ben Reardon as the new manager, alongside Steve Potts and Ashley Edwards as the coaching team for the new side. Witney competed in the Oxford Senior League for the 2024–25 season.

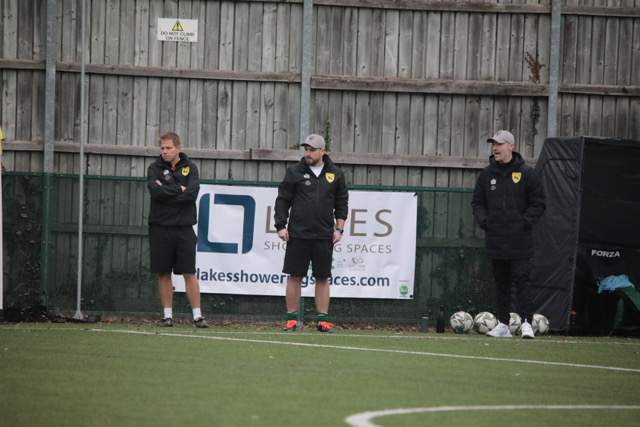
Coaches Steve Potts and Ashley Edwards, alongside the manager Ben Reardon in a home game in 2025

Witney Town played their first game, a preseason friendly with Didcot Town, on Saturday 3 August 2024. They lost 6–1, but Harry Furlong scored the team's first goal of their new era in the second half. On 18 January 2025, they reached the Oxfordshire Charity Cup final, beating KEA 4–0 away in the semi-final. On 23 April, a 4–3 win at East Oxford F.C. clinched the Oxfordshire Senior League Division 2 title for Witney, their first championship at any level since 1978. With it, the club secured promotion to Division 1 of the Senior League.

The following season (2025–26), not only did Witney win promotion (as champions) again, this time to the Premier Division of the Oxfordshire Senior League (the bottom rung of the Football League pyramid), but they also completed the "double" on 2 May 2026 when a 5–2 extra-time victory over Dorchester F.C., played at Kidlington's ground, secured them the Ben Turner Cup. They had come back from being 2–0 down at half time to level the tie at 2–2 at full time and take it into extra time.

On 25 August 2026, four days before the start of the 2026–27 season, it was announced that the first-team management team of Ben Reardon, Steve Potts and Ashley Edwards had left to join Witney's ground-share neighbours North Leigh F.C., where Ben Reardon had played during his career. On 17 September 2026, former Swindon Town academy and Witney player Shaun Wimble was announced as the new first team manager.

== Ground ==
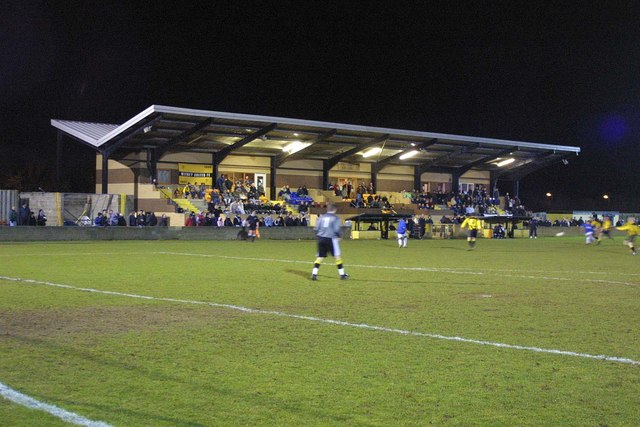
The main stand at Marriott's Close, 2008

Witney Town played their home games at Marriotts Close in Witney, and later at Downs Road, Curbridge (known successively as Oakey Park, the Marriotts Stadium, and Witney Community Stadium).

As of the 2024–25 season, Witney Town play their home games at the Witney Artificial Pitch on Gordon Way in Witney, named unofficially in 2025 as the Witney Community Stadium. For the 2026–27 season and onwards, Witney Town's home fixtures were to be played at a newly built facility in Windrush Place, Witney. In July 2026, it was announced that Witney Town would be ground-sharing with North Leigh F.C. at Eynsham Park for the foreseeable future. Witney Town's newly formed Reserve/Development Team would play at Windrush Place, in Division Five of the Oxfordshire Senior League.

== Honours ==
=== League & Cup honours ===
- Hellenic League Premier Division Challenge Cup:
  - Runners-up (1): 1965–66
- Hellenic League
  - Premier Division Winners: 1970–71, 1971–72, 1972–73
- Southern League
  - Division One North, Winners: 1977–78
- Oxfordshire Senior Cup
  - Winners 1994–95, 1995–96, 1997–98
- Oxfordshire Senior League
  - Division 2 Champions; 2024–25
- Oxfordshire Charity Cup
  - Runners Up: 2024–25
- Oxfordshire Senior League
  - Division 1 Champions; 2025–26
- Ben Turner Cup
  - Winners 2025–26
