= 1954–55 Hellenic Football League =

The 1954–55 Hellenic Football League season was the second in the history of the Hellenic Football League, a football competition in England.

== Clubs ==
Hellenic Football League
- Season: 1954–55
- Champions: Witney Town
- Matches: 306
- Goals: 1,675 (5.47 per match)

The league featured 16 clubs which competed in the last season, along with two new clubs:

- Kidlington
- Rickmansworth Town

=== League table ===
Pos	Team	Pld	W	D	L	GF	GA	GR	Pts	Promotion or relegation
1	Witney Town	34	23	5	6	133	60	2.217	51	
2	Bicester Town	34	23	2	9	123	77	1.597	48	
3	Pressed Steel (Oxford)	34	20	5	9	100	63	1.587	45	
4	Newbury Town Reserves	34	20	2	12	110	82	1.341	42	
5	Staines Town	34	17	5	12	88	70	1.257	39	
6	Didcot Town	34	17	5	12	100	85	1.176	39	
7	Thatcham Town	34	15	9	10	96	92	1.043	39	
8	Chipping Norton Town	34	16	6	12	99	77	1.286	38	
9	Stokenchurch	34	15	6	13	108	89	1.213	36	
10	Headington United 'A'	34	17	2	15	90	79	1.139	36	
11	Wallingford Town	34	13	4	17	99	96	1.031	30	
12	Amersham Town	34	12	4	18	104	112	0.929	28	
13	Rickmansworth Town	34	11	6	17	78	99	0.788	28	
14	Kidlington	34	11	6	17	74	106	0.698	28	
15	Buckingham Town	34	12	3	19	90	116	0.776	27	
16	Abingdon Town	34	9	6	19	64	89	0.719	24	
17	Princes Risborough Town	34	9	1	24	58	148	0.392	19	
18	Leighton United	34	5	5	24	61	135	0.452	15	Transferred to the South Midlands League

Source: nonleaguematters
Rules for classification: 1) points; 2) goal ratio; 3) number of goals scored.
