= Hook Norton F.C. =

Association football club in England

Coordinates: 51°59′55.20″N 1°29′18.10″W

Hook Norton
- Full name: Hook Norton Football Club
- Nicknames: Hooky, The Brewery Boys
- Founded: 1898
- Ground: The Bourne, Hook Norton
- Chairman: Louis Stratford
- Manager: Michael Hemmings
- League: Banbury District & Lord Jersey Premier Division
- 2024–25: Banbury District & Lord Jersey Premier Division, 5th of 9
Home colours	Away colours

Hook Norton Football Club is a football club based in Hook Norton, near Banbury, Oxfordshire England. They are currently members of the Banbury District & Lord Jersey Premier Division and play at the Bourne.

== History ==
The club was established in 1898, and was initially a works team for the Brymbo Ironstone Company. In the 1980s they were playing in the Banbury & District League and were Premier Division champions for the first time in 1984–85. After winning the league on four more occasions, the club moved up to the Oxfordshire Senior League in 1998. They were promoted to the Premier Division at the first attempt, and went on to win the Premier Division in 1999–2000.

After winning the Oxfordshire Senior League Premier Division again the following season, Hook Norton were promoted to Division One West of the Hellenic League. The club won Division One West at the first attempt, earning promotion to the Premier Division, although they had to move to Banbury United's Spencer Stadium in order to play at that level as their Bourne ground did not meet the ground grading regulations.

Hook Norton finished in the Premier Division relegation zone at the end of the 2003–04 season and were relegated back to Division One West. A third-place finish in Division One West in 2006–07 saw the club promoted to the Premier Division again. However, they finished bottom of the Premier Division in 2009–10 and were relegated to Division One West for a second time. In 2014–15 the club won the league's Supplementary Cup.

In June 2017 Hook Norton withdrew from the Hellenic League and disbanded due to a lack of committee members. However, the club reformed in 2018 and joined Division Three of the Witney & District League. In 2018–19 they won the league's Supplementary Cup, beating Wootton 4–1 in the final. The club also finished third in Division Three, earning promotion to Division Two. Two more promotions followed, but they then withdrew from the league in 2022–23 due to a lack of players, citing their plans to return the following season.

== Honours ==
- Hellenic League
  - Division One West champions 2001–02
  - Supplementary Cup winners 2014–15
- Witney & District League
  - Supplementary Cup winners 2018–19
- Oxfordshire Senior League
  - Champions 1999–2000, 2000–01
- Banbury & District League
  - Champions 1984–85

== Records ==
- Best FA Cup second qualifying round, 2015–16
- Best FA Vase second round, 2008–09
- Record attendance: 533 vs Weston-super-Mare, FA Cup second qualifying round, 26 September 2015
