= North Berks Football League =

Association football league in England

- Founded: 1908
- Divisions: 2
- Number of clubs: 23
- Feeder to: Oxfordshire Senior League; Thames Valley Premier League; Wiltshire League
- Current champions: Berinsfield (2024–25)
- Website: Official website

The North Berks Football League is a football competition in England. The league was founded in 1908. It has a total of two divisions, Division One and Division Two. The vast majority of clubs are based in the administrative county of Oxfordshire but most are within the boundaries of the historic county of Berkshire.

== 2025–26 Members ==
=== Division One ===
- Berinsfield
- Burghclere
- Compton
- Didcot Town Youth
- Drayton
- Kingston Colts
- Marcham
- Steventon
- Woodcote Development

=== Division Two ===
- Athletic Football Club Grove (AFC Grove)
- Benson Lions
- Berinsfield Reserves
- Drayton Reserves
- Hagbourne United
- Marcham Reserves
- Stanford-in-the-Vale FC
- Steventon Reserves

== List of Champions since 1970 ==
Season	Division One winners
1970–71	Harwell Village
1971–72	Buckland
1972–73	Great Shefford
1973–74	Bampton
1974–75	Buckland
1975–76	Buckland
1976–77	Buckland
1977–78	Kintbury Rangers
1978–79	Faringdon Town
1979–80	Harwell Village
1980–81	Woodcote
1981–82	Kintbury Rangers
1982–83	Berinsfield
1983–84	Childrey United
1984–85	Saxton Rovers
1985–86	Milton United
1986–87	Saxton Rovers
1987–88	Milton United
1988–89	Milton United
1989–90	Letcombe
1990–91	Saxton Rovers
1991–92	Saxton Rovers
1992–93	Harwell Village
1993–94	Saxton Rovers
1994–95	Harwell Village
1995–96	Saxton Rovers
1996–97	Drayton
1997–98	Shrivenham
1998–99	Saxton Rovers
1999–2000	Saxton Rovers
2000–01	Shrivenham
2001–02	Kintbury Rangers
2002–03	Kintbury Rangers
2003–04	Kintbury Rangers
2004–05	Drayton
2005–06	Lambourn Sports
2006–07	Ardington & Lockinge
2007–08	Lambourn Sports
2008–09	Saxton Rovers
2009–10	Saxton Rovers
2010–11	Lambourn Sports
2011–12	Crowmarsh Gifford
2012–13	Saxton Rovers
2013–14	Kintbury Rangers
2014–15	Berinsfield
2015–16	Kintbury Rangers
2016–17	Berinsfield
2017–18	Saxton Rovers
2018–19	Saxton Rovers
2019–20	season abandoned due to COVID-19
2020–21	Berinsfield
2021–22	East Hendred
2022–23	Abingdon United Development
2023–24	Abingdon United Development
2024–25	Berinsfield
