= Kintbury Rangers F.C. =

Association football club in England

Coordinates: 51°23′47.42″N 1°27′04.26″W

Kintbury Rangers
- Full name: Kintbury Rangers Football Club
- Nickname: The Gers
- Founded: 1890
- Ground: The Recreation Ground, Kintbury
- Chairman: Jason McBride
- League: Wessex League Division One
- 2025–26: Wessex League Division One, 12th of 22
- Website: http://www.kintburyrangersfc.co.uk/
Home colours

Kintbury Rangers F.C. are a football club based in the village of Kintbury, West Berkshire, England. In the 2022–23 season they play in the Wiltshire Senior League. Their nickname is the 'Gers'.

== History ==
The club was formed in 1890. After the Second World War, Rangers joined the Newbury & District League, going on to win the league in the 1958–59 campaign. The club joined the North Berks Football League Premier Division in the 1967–68 season, staying in the Premier Division for three seasons before suffering relegation at the end of the 1969–70 season, and a subsequent relegation the following season to Division Two.

It took Kintbury another five seasons to get back to the top division of the North Berks League, doing so by winning Division Two title in the 1975–76 season. Over the next seven seasons the club won the league twice, in the 1977–78 season and the 1981–82 season. In their last season in the North Berks League, the club almost won the league again after finishing level on points with Berinsfield, though they lost out after a 5–4 defeat in a play-off for the title.

In 1983–84, Rangers joined the Hellenic Football League Division One, gaining promotion to the Premier Division in the 1987–88 season and staying there until 1999, when they left to re-join the North Berks Football League. During this stint in the North Berks League, the club lifted the league title three times in a row from the 2001–02 season and achieved the treble of the league, North Berks Cup & North Berks Charity Shield in the 2001–02 and 2002–03 seasons.

They then rejoined the Hellenic Football League in the 2004–05 season, finishing runners-up in Division One East in their first season back. They stayed in the division until the 2010/11 season, before leaving again to re-join the North Berks League.

Rangers claimed the first silverware since their return to the North Berks Football League in April 2014, defeating Ardington & Lockinge 5–3 in extra-time to lift the North Berks Charity Shield for the third time. The season was rounded off when they defeated Saxton Rovers 3–1 in the final game of the season at the Recreation Ground to secure the North Berks Football League Division One title, losing just once throughout the campaign.

Rangers' redemption after losing their crown to Berinsfield in a fiercely contended battle in 2014–15 came on 7 May 2016, as they regained the North Berks Football League Division One title. Kintbury did their part, beating Long Wittenham Athletic 2–1 at the Recreation Ground, before local rivals and fellow title hopefuls Lambourn Sports F.C. were dismantled 4–1 by Saxton Rovers to hand Rangers their seventh NBFL Division One success. The first team's title win was accompanied by a historic season from the Reserves side as they completed a cup treble, winning the North Berks Football League AG Kingham Cup & Nairne Paul Trophy and the Berks & Bucks Football Association County Junior Cup for the first time, as well as finishing as runners-up in the North Berks Division Two.

After achieving second place in the Hellenic League Division Two South in 2021–22, the club entered the Wiltshire Senior League in 2022–23.

== Ground ==
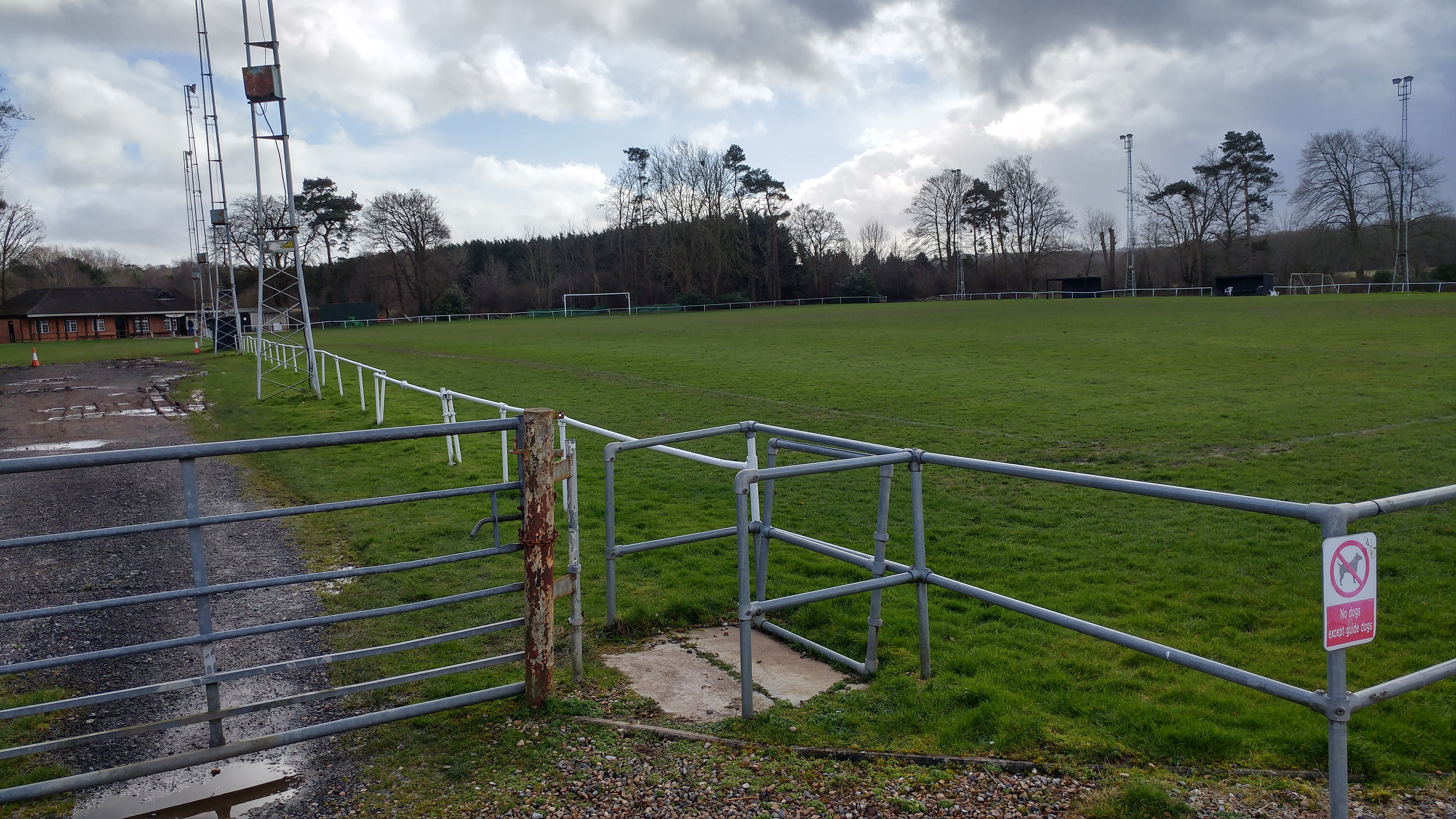
The recreation ground, home of Kintbury Rangers F.C.

Kintbury Rangers play at the Recreation Ground on Inkpen Road in Kintbury. The ground features a clubhouse with a licensed bar, Sky TV and free Wi-Fi. The football club is adjacent to Kintbury Tennis Club and Kintbury Bowls Club, as well as the indoor sports facility, the Jubilee Centre.

== Honours ==
=== League honours ===
- Hellenic Football League One East
  - Runners-up (1): 2004–05
- North Berks Football League Division One
  - Winners (7): 1977–78, 1981–82, 2001–02, 2002–03, 2003–04, 2013–14, 2015–16
  - Runners-up (3): 1982–83, 2000–01, 2014–15
- North Berks Football League Division Two
  - Winners (2): 1973–74, 1975–76
- Newbury & District League Premier Division
  - Winners (1): 1958–59

=== Cup honours ===
- Hellenic Football League Challenge Cup:
  - Runners-up (1): 1996–97
- North Berks Football League Cup
  - Winners (4): 2000–01, 2001–02, 2002–03, 2003–04
- North Berks Football League Charity Shield
  - Winners (3): 2001–02, 2002–03, 2013–2014
  - Runners-up (1): 1977–78
- North Berks Football League Cup
  - Winners (1): 1972–73
- Newbury Graystone Cup
  - Winners (2): 1950–51, 1964–65
  - Runners-up (1): 1960–61
- Berks & Bucks Football Association Intermediate Cup
  - Runners-up (1): 1960–61
- Berks & Bucks Football Association Junior Cup (Reserves)
  - Winners (1): 2015–16
- North Berks Football League AG Kingham Cup (Reserves)
  - Winners (3): 2005–06, 2014–15, 2015–16
- North Berks Football League Nairne Paul Trophy (Reserves)
  - Winners (1): 2015–16, 2016–2017
  - Runners-up (2): 2002–2003, 2013–14, 2014–15

== Records ==
- Highest League Position: 8th in Hellenic League premier Division: 1989–90
- FA VASE Best Performance: Second Qualifying Round: 1996–97, 1997–98, 1998–99, 1999–2000
- Highest Attendance: 353 v Newport AFC (now Newport County), Hellenic League Premier Division, November 1989.

== Notable former players ==
A list of players that have played for the club at one stage and meet one of the following criteria;

1. Players that have played/managed in the football league or any foreign equivalent to this level (i.e. fully professional league).
2. Players with full international caps.
- (England) Charlie Austin
- (England) Brett Angell
- (England) Darren Angell
