= Englefield Green Rovers F.C. =

Coordinates: 51.436196°N 0.567095°W

Englefield Green Rovers
- Full name: Englefield Green Rovers Football Club
- Nickname: The Rovers
- Founded: 1927
- Dissolved: 2009
- Ground: Coopers Hill Lane, Englefield Green
- 2008–09: Hellenic Football League; Division One East,13th
Home colours

Englefield Green Rovers F.C. was a football club based in Englefield Green, near Egham, England. They were members of the Surrey FA.

== History ==
Englefield Green Rovers were founded in 1927. They won the Windsor, Slough & District League Division 3 in the 1984–85 season, and joined the Chiltonian League Division One in 1996, becoming members of Hellenic Football League Division One East when the two leagues merged in 2000. They left the Hellenic League in 2009, and did not play in the 2009–10 season.

== Ground ==
The club played at Coopers Hill Lane in Englefield Green., until their lease was terminated and local boys' club Manorcroft United FC moved in instead.

== Colours ==
Englefield's home colours were green and white shirts, with white shorts and green socks.

== Records ==
- Highest placing: Third in Hellenic Football League Division One East
- Record gate: 100 v Eton Wick in 1999
