= Gloucester United F.C. =

English football club

Gloucester United F.C. was a football club based in Gloucester in England. They joined the Hellenic League Division One West in 2000 and won the title in their first season. They played in the Hellenic League Premier Division until 2004, when they folded. They shared Gloucester City's Meadow Park ground.

During their brief existence, they never competed in the FA Cup, but made two appearances in the FA Vase, losing their first match on each occasion.
