= Oxfordshire County Football Association =

Area sporting organization with 19th century origins

Oxfordshire Football Association
- Abbreviation: OFA
- Formation: 26 January 1884
- Headquarters: Bicester Leisure Centre, Queens Avenue, Bicester, Oxfordshire, OX26 2NR
- Location: Bicester, Oxfordshire
- Chief Executive: Jonathan Duckworth
- Website: www.oxfordshirefa.com

Oxfordshire Football Association, also simply known as the Oxfordshire FA, is the not-for-profit governing body of football in the county of Oxfordshire.

== History ==
Oxfordshire FA was founded on 26 January 1884. The original members of the association were:

- Ark House School (Banbury)
- Banbury Harriers
- Banbury Rovers
- Bicester
- Bloxham School
- Caversham
- Culham College
- Friar Park (Henley)
- Oxford County School (Thame)
- Shennington
- Thame

On 9 September 1999 at an extraordinary general meeting of the Association, a proposal was carried that from 29 September 1999 the Oxfordshire Football Association be dissolved and reformed as the Oxfordshire Football Association Limited, to create a company limited by guarantee that supports its current charitable trust foundation, which was first registered with the Charity Commission on 23 January 1989.

== County Cups ==
Oxfordshire FA deliver a range of cup competitions open to their affiliated member clubs of which the premier competition is the Oxfordshire FA Senior Cup. The full list of competitions is as follows:

- Oxfordshire FA Senior Cup
- Oxfordshire FA Women's Cup
- Oxfordshire FA John Fathers Junior Shield
- Oxfordshire FA Intermediate Cup
- Oxfordshire FA Charity Cup
- Oxfordshire FA Sunday Cup
- Oxfordshire FA Patrick O'Flanagan Memorial Veterans Cup
- Oxfordshire FA Joe Roughton U18 Youth Cup
- Oxfordshire FA U18 Girls' Cup
- Oxfordshire FA U16 Youth Cup
- Oxfordshire FA U16 Girls' Cup
- Oxfordshire FA U15 Mickey Lewis Youth Cup
- Oxfordshire FA U15 Girls' Cup
- Oxfordshire FA Steve Simmonds U14 Youth Cup
- Oxfordshire FA U14 Girls' Cup
- Oxfordshire FA Ron Smith U13 Youth Cup
- Oxfordshire FA U13 Girls' Cup
- Oxfordshire FA U12 Youth Cup
- Oxfordshire FA U12 Girls' Cup
