= Henley Town F.C. =

Association football club in England

Coordinates: 51°31′44.77″N 0°53′31.19″W

Henley Town
- Full name: Henley Town Football Club
- Nickname: The Red Kites
- Founded: 1871
- Ground: The Triangle Ground, Henley-on-Thames
- Chairman: Mick Keane
- Manager: Paul Mulvaney
- League: Thames Valley Premier League Premier Division
- 2025–26: Thames Valley Premier League Premier Division, 8th of 15
- Website: henleytownfootballclub.co.uk
Home colours

Henley Town Football Club is a football club based in Henley-on-Thames in Oxfordshire, England. They are currently members of the Thames Valley Premier League Premier Division and play at the Triangle Ground.

== History ==
The club was established in November 1871, making it the oldest club recognised by the Oxfordshire County Football Association. They joined the Reading Temperance League and were league champions in 1912–13, finishing as runners-up the following season. In 1931 the club joined Division Two West of the Spartan League. After two mid-table finishes, the club won the division in 1933–34, earning promotion to Division One. In 1936–37 they were Division One champions and were promoted to the Premier Division. However, they finished bottom of the Premier Division the following season, winning only one match, and were relegated back to Division One.

When the Spartan League was suspended in 1939 due to World War II, Henley spent the 1939–40 season in the Great Western Combination. When football resumed after the war, Henley returned to the Spartan League and were placed in the Western Division. They finished second-from-bottom and missed out on a place in the Premier Division the following season. In 1952 they rejoined the Great Western Combination, becoming members of Division One. Despite finishing bottom of the division in their first season in the league, they were not relegated to Division Two. However, after finishing bottom of the division again in 1954–55 the club left the league.

In 1957 Henley joined Division One of the Hellenic League. They were Division One champions in 1963–64, resulting in promotion to the Premier Division. However, the following season saw them finish in the bottom two in the Premier Division, resulting in relegation back to Division One. They won Division One again in 1967–68 without losing a match, earning promotion to the Premier Division. After losing their Reading Ground in 1971 the club dropped out of the Hellenic League. Later regrouping in the Wycombe & District League, the club were promoted to the Senior Division at the first attempt and won both the league and the Wycombe Senior Cup in 1978–79.

Henley were founder members of the Chiltonian League in 1984. When it gained a second division the following season, they were placed in Division Two. The division was renamed Division One in 1987 and the club went on to win the division in the 1987–88 season, earning promotion to the Premier Division. They were relegated back to Division One at the end of the 1990–91 season, but a fourth-place finish in Division One in 1992–92 was enough to secure promotion back to the Premier Division. The club won the Premier Division title in 1999–2000. At the end of the season the Chiltonian League merged into the Hellenic League, with Henley becoming members of Division One East. They won the division at the first attempt, earning promotion to the Premier Division.

After finishing bottom of the Premier Division in 2005–06, Henley were relegated to Division One East. They remained in the division until the end of the 2010–11 season, when they were promoted back to the Premier Division as Division One East runners-up. However, they only spent one season in the Premier Division before being relegated back to Division One East due to their ground failing to meet the necessary criteria. In 2015–16 the club finished third in Division One East and were promoted to the Premier Division; the season also saw them win the Reading Senior Cup with a 5–3 defeat of Binfield at the Madejski Stadium. However, they finished bottom of the Premier Division the following season and were relegated back to Division One East. In December 2017 the club resigned from the Hellenic League.

The 2018–19 season saw Henley restart in Division Three of the Thames Valley Premier League, which they went on to win as champions, earning promotion to Division Two. In 2020–21 the club were Division Two champions, resulting in promotion to Division One. Despite only finishing sixth in Division One in 2022–23, they were promoted to the Premier Division. But in 2024-25 Henley survived relegation against relegation rivals Newbury FC in 3-2 win from coming 2-0 down in their final home game of the season.

== Ground ==
The earliest recorded ground for the club is on Marlow Road. They played at Reading Road from 1901 until 1971, then played at temporary grounds during the 1973–74 season before moving to the Triangle Ground on Mill Lane.

== Honours ==
- Hellenic League
  - Division One champions 1963–64, 1967–68,
  - Division One East champions 2000–01
  - Division One Benevolent Fund Cup winners 1962–63
- Chiltonian League
  - Premier Division champions 1999–2000
  - Division One champions 1987–88
  - Bon Accord Trophy winners 1997–98
- Spartan League
  - Division One champions 1936–37
  - Division Two West champions 1933–34
- Thames Valley Premier League
  - Division Two champions 2020–21
  - Division Three champions 2018–19
- Wycombe & District League
  - Champions 1978–79
- Reading Temperance League
  - Division One champions 1912–13
- Oxfordshire Senior Cup
  - Winners 1903–04, 1910–11, 1912–13, 1913–14, 1946–47
- Reading Senior Cup
  - Winners 2015–16
- Oxfordshire Charity Cup
  - Winners 1904–05, 1913–14, 1936–37, 1962–63

== Records ==
- Best FA Cup performance: First qualifying round 2007–08
- Best FA Vase performance: First round 2005–06, 2007–08, 2011–12, 2015–16
- Record attendance: Over 2,000 vs Reading, 1922
- Most goals: M. Turner

== See also ==
- Henley Town F.C. players
- Henley Town F.C. managers
