= Hounslow Borough F.C. =

Hounslow Borough
- Full name: Hounslow Borough Football Club
- Founded: 1987
- Dissolved: 2007
- Ground: Conquest Club, Isleworth
- 2006–07: Hellenic League Premier Division, (withdrew)

Hounslow Borough Football Club were an English football club based in Isleworth in the London Borough of Hounslow. They played at the Conquest Club.

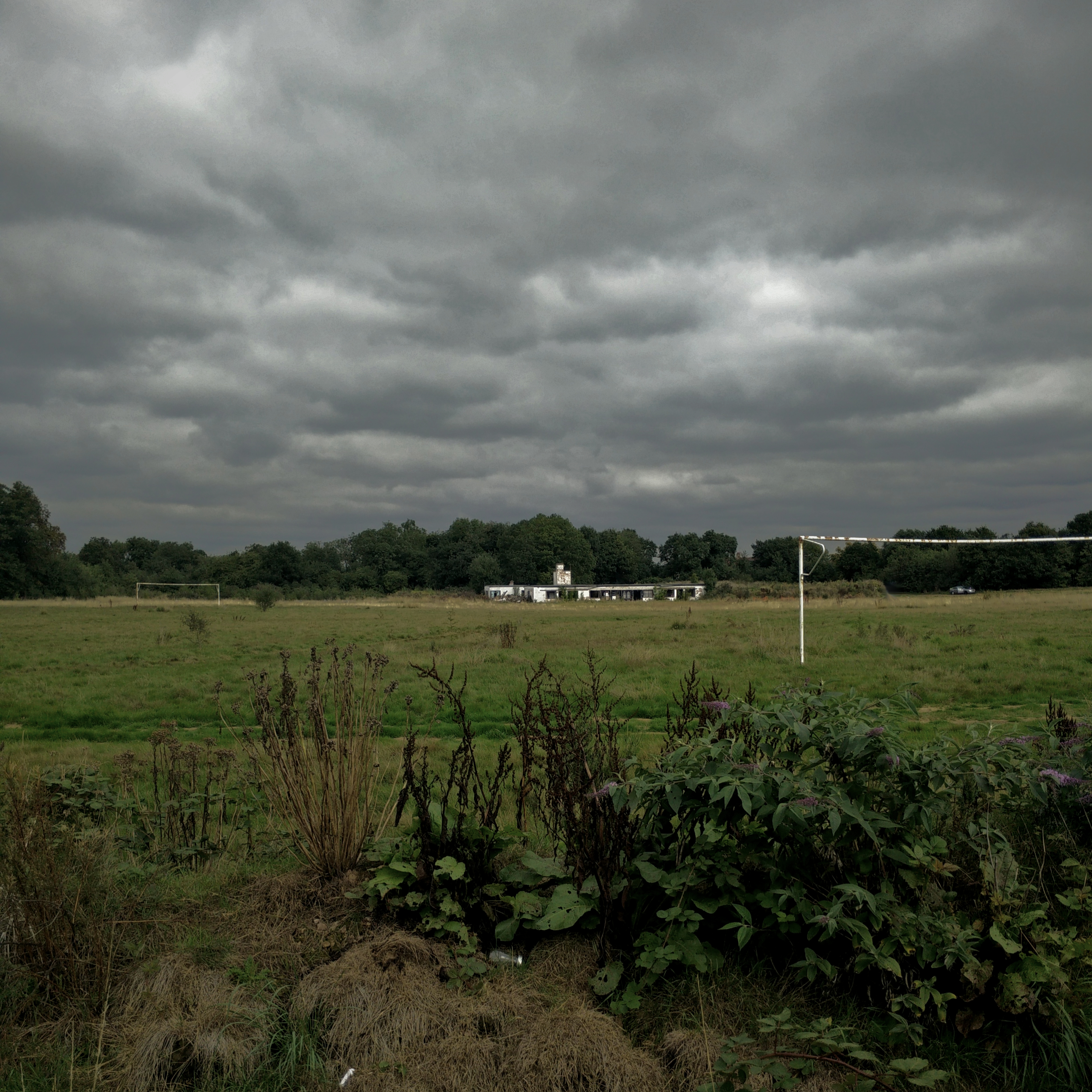
Hounslow Borough's old ground at the Conquest Club

== History ==
The club was established in 1987, and were originally known as Harrow Hill Rovers. They initially played in the Hounslow & District League, before moving up to the Middlesex County League. In 1998 they joined Division One the Chiltonian League. After finishing seventh in their first season, they were promoted to the Premier Division. In 2000 the Chiltonian League merged into the Hellenic League, with the club placed in Division One East. In 2001 the club was renamed Hounslow Borough.

They were Division One East champions in 2005–06 and were promoted to the Premier Division. However, they had to play home matches at Ruislip Manor's ground as the stand at their Conquest Club ground only held 70 spectators. The club resigned from the league in April 2007 resulting in their record being expunged, and later folded.

== Honours ==
- Hellenic League Division One East
  - Champions 2005–06

== Records ==
- FA Vase
  - Second Round 2006–07

== Former players ==
1. Players that have played/managed in the Football League or any foreign equivalent to this level (i.e. fully professional league).
2. Players with full international caps.
3. Players that hold a club record or have captained the club.

- (England) Andy Driscoll
- (England) Steven Caulker
