= Bisley F.C. =

Bisley
- Full name: Bisley Football Club
- Nickname(s): The Biz
- Founded: 1965 (as Bisley Sports)
- Dissolved: 2009 (became Farnborough Reserves)
- Ground: Lion Park, Bisley
- Chairman: Keith Hills
- Manager: Steve Atkins
- League: Hellenic Football League; Division One East
- 2007–08: Hellenic Football League; Division One East, 8th

Bisley F.C. was a football club based in Bisley in Surrey Heath, Surrey, England, who played from 2001 in part of the Hellenic Football League until the 2009–10 season, after which its players agreed to join the Farnborough F.C. Reserves and permitted Farnborough F.C. to therefore takeover its Lion Park grounds and position in the league, which has regular paid match attendance at its main ground and uses the site as its football academy and elite development centre.

== History ==
The club was established in 1965 and moved up from the Surrey Intermediate League to the Surrey County Premier League in 1993. A further move up came in 2001, when joined the Hellenic League, Division One East in which they stayed until the club's dissolution at the end of the 2009–10 season.

Bisley's players became the feeder team to Farnborough F.C. as of the 2007–08 football season, who were in liquidation and fell out of the Conference.

Bisley's chairman Simon Hollis joined Tony Theo's consortium at the larger club and established a link up which saw Bisley FC operate as Farnborough's reserve side. This close relationship also saw the first Farnborough training at Bisley and until the takeover and the Bisley youth side playing at the other club's ground (Cherrywood Road).

The relationship continued with Bisley's management team of Andy Clement and Steve Moss, rated as successful by Farnborough, taking over the helm at Farnborough with ex-Farnborough Town player Ian Savage taking an academy role at Lion Park.

== Colours ==
The home kit was yellow shirts, yellow shorts and yellow socks. The away kit was red shirts and white shorts and socks.

== Honours ==
- Hellenic League
  - Division One East Champions 2006–07
- Surrey FA Saturday Premier Cup :
  - Runners-up 1998–99

== Website ==
From 2006 until its quasi-merger that was technically a dissolution, the club used the www.bisleyfc.com web domain.
