= Prestwood F.C. =

Association football club in England

Coordinates: 51°42′11.33″N 0°45′08.18″W

- Full name: Prestwood Football Club
- Nickname: The Wood
- Founded: 1934
- Ground: The Sprinters Leisure Centre, Prestwood
- Manager: Tom Rudge/Chas Littlejohn
- League: Aylesbury & District Football League Premier Division
Home colours	Away colours

Prestwood F.C. are a football club based in Prestwood, near High Wycombe, England. They currently play in the Aylesbury & District League Premier Division. The club is affiliated to the Berks & Bucks Football Association

== History ==
The club was founded in 1934. The club were founder members of the Wycombe Senior League In 1984 they became founding members of the Chiltonian League. When the Chiltonian league merged with the Hellenic League in 2000, they joined Division One East.

For nine seasons they stayed in the Hellenic league, until midway during their tenth campaign, the 2009–10 season. In November 2009 the club resigned from the league, stating that they did not have enough players or finances to continue the rest of the league season.

In the 2010–11 season the club joined the Wycombe & District League Senior Section, where they have remained until the end of the 2018-19 season. For the season 2019–20 the First Team will play in the Aylesbury & District Premier League and the reserves will play in the ADL Division 2.

The club were accepted back into the Hellenic league for the 2024-25 season, where they were placed in Division 2 East.

== Ground ==
Prestwood home is Prestwood Sports & Leisure Complex, Honor End Lane HP16 9QY.

== Honours ==
=== League honours ===
- Princess Risborough & District League:
  - Winners 1935–36
- Wycombe & District League:
  - League division two winners 1938–39
  - League champions 1951–1952
  - League champions 1981–1982
  - League runners up: 1982–83, 2011–12
  - League champions: 2016–17, 2017–18

=== Cup honours ===
- Chalfont & Gerrards Cross Cup:
  - Runners up 1949–1950
- Chesham Charity Cup:
  - Winners 1951–1952
  - Runners up 1953–1954
  - Winners 2001–2002
- Reading Junior Cup:
  - Runners up 1971–1972
- Wycombe Senior Cup:
  - Runners up 1954–1955
  - Runners up 1980–1981
  - Runners up 2003–2004
- WDFL
  - Tom Hooker League Cup Winners 2015–16
  - Reserve Cup winners 2016–17
- Aylesbury & District Football League
  - Marsworth Reserve Cup Winners 2018–19

== Records ==
- Highest League Position: 8th in Hellenic Division One East 2001–02
- Top Goalscorer:
- Highest attendance: V Turner Sports 2000
