= Chiltonian League =

English football league

The Chiltonian League was an English football league, existing from 1984 until its merger with the Hellenic League in 2000. While never having a defined place in the English football league system, successful clubs moved from the Chiltonian League to the Combined Counties League and to the South Midlands League.

== History ==
=== 1984–1985 ===
The league originally consisted of a single section of 17 clubs, most of which had previously competed in the Wycombe & District League.

Season	Champions
1984–85	Holmer Green

=== 1985–1995 ===
After its inaugural season, the league expanded to two divisions (for first teams; reserve divisions were constituted separately). The divisions were originally known as Divisions One and Two, but after two seasons this was changed to Premier Division and Division One.

Season	Division One	Division Two
1985–86	Holmer Green	Drayton Wanderers
1986–87	Coopers Payen	Seer Green
Season	Premier Division	Division One
1987–88	Henley Town	Finchampstead
1988–89	Coopers Payen	Mill End Sports
1989–90	Coopers Payen	Binfield
1990–91	Peppard	Letcombe
1991–92	Peppard	Eton Wick
1992–93	Eton Wick	Broadmoor Staff
1993–94	Holmer Green	Slough Irish Society
1994–95	Reading Town	Denham United

=== 1995–1999 ===
In 1995, the reserve divisions were scrapped and the league re-constituted into a single structure of three divisions – Premier Division, Division One and Division Two

Season	Premier Division	Division One	Division Two
1995–96	Binfield	Vansittart Wanderers	Penn & Tylers Green reserves
1996–97	Denham United	Eton Wick reserves	Drayton Wanderers reserves
1997–98	A.F.C. Wallingford	Cippenham Village	Henley Town reserves
1998–99	Eton Wick	Finchampstead reserves	Stocklake reserves

=== 1999–2000 ===
With only six teams completing the 1998–99 Division Two season, that division was dropped and the league returned to a two-division structure. At the end of the 1999–2000 season, the league merged into an expanded Hellenic League.

Season	Premier Division	Division One
1999–00	Henley Town	Eton Wick reserves
