= Finchampstead F.C. =

Association football club in England

Coordinates: 51°21′47.66″N 0°51′36.86″W

Finchampstead
- Full name: Finchampstead Football Club
- Nickname: Finch
- Founded: 1952
- Ground: Memorial Park, Finchampstead
- Chairman: Lee Fryer
- Manager: Paul Abbott
- League: Thames Valley Premier League Premier Division
- 2025–26: Thames Valley Premier League Premier Division, 14th of 15
Home colours	Away colours

Finchampstead Football Club is a football club based in Finchampstead, Berkshire, England. They are currently members of the Thames Valley Premier League Premier Division and play at Memorial Park.

== History ==
The club was established in 1952 after the creation of Memorial Park allowed a football team to be formed. The club joined the Ascot & District League, winning Division Two in 1954–55. The following season saw them win Division One and move up to Division Two of the Reading & District League. In 1956–57 they were Division Two champions, and after being promoted, they won Division One in 1959–60, earning promotion to the Premier Division. The club were relegated to Division Two during the 1960s, but after winning the division in 1977–78, they were promoted back to Division One and were Division One champions the following season, resulting in promotion back to the Premier Division. They went on to win the league's Premier Division in 1982–83.

After winning the Reading Senior Cup and finishing as Reading & District League Premier Division runners-up in 1986–87, Finchampstead joined the Premier Division of the Chiltonian League, winning it at the first attempt. They were runners-up the following season and again in 1992–93, and won the league's Bon Accord Trophy in 1993–94. In 2000 the league merged into the Hellenic League, with the club becoming members of Division One East. Although they won the division in 2001–02 they were unable to be promoted to the Premier Division as Memorial Park did not have floodlights.

Due to the club's failure to meet the ground grading regulations, Finchampstead's first team left the Hellenic League at the end of the 2016–17 season, dropping into Division One of the Thames Valley Premier League. Despite only finishing fifth in the division in 2018–19, the club were promoted to the Premier Division. In 2020–21 they were Premier Division champions, but were unable to be promoted due to the ground grading regulations. They were champions again in 2021–22, also winning the League Cup with a 2–1 win against Richings Park in the final.

== Ground ==
The club play at Memorial Park, located in the Memorial Ground. The ground is shared with the cricket club, with the football club having to play the first few matches of the season away from home to avoid a fixture clash.

== Honours ==
- Hellenic League
  - Division One East champions 2001–02
- Chiltonian League
  - Premier Division champions 1987–88
  - Bon Accord Trophy winners 1993–94
- Thames Valley Premier League
  - Premier Division champions 2020–21, 2021–22
  - League Cup winners 2021–22
- Reading & District League
  - Premier Division champions 1982–83
  - Division One champions 1957–58, 1978–79
  - Division Two champions 1956–57, 1977–78
- Ascot & District League
  - Division One champions 1955–56
  - Division Two champions 1954–55
- Reading Senior Cup
  - Winners 1986–87
- Berks and Bucks FA Intermediate Cup
  - Winners 1983–84
- Berks and Bucks FA Junior Cup
  - Winners 1960–61
- Ascot & District Charity Cup
  - Winners 1957–58, 1979–80, 1983–84
- Yateley & District Currie Cup
  - Winners 1958–59, 1981–82

== Records ==
- Record attendance: 425 vs Sandhurst, 1958–59
