= Milton United F.C. =

Association football club in England

Coordinates: 51°36′54″N 1°18′18″W

Milton United
- Full name: Milton United Football Club
- Nickname: Miltonians
- Ground: Potash Lane, Milton Hill
- Chairman: Gareth Woodward
- Manager: Christian Lawrence
- League: Combined Counties League Premier Division North
- 2025–26: Combined Counties League Premier Division North, 13th of 20 (resigned)
Home colours	Away colours

Milton United Football Club is a football club based in Milton, near Didcot in Oxfordshire, England. Affiliated to the Berks & Bucks Football Association, they are currently members of the Combined Counties League Premier Division North and play at Potash Lane.

== History ==
Under the name Milton Hill, the club were founder members of the North Berks League in 1909, becoming members of the Wallingford Division. They were transferred to the Abingdon Division the following season and finished bottom of the section, after which they left the league. The club returned to the league in 1921 as Milton, joining Division Two (Wantage), finishing bottom of the division in 1921–22. By the following season they had become Milton United, and were runners-up in the Wantage division, also playing in Division Two (Didcot). In 1923–24 they played only in the Didcot division, before being transferred to Division Two (Abingdon) in 1924.

In 1926–27 Milton were Division Two (Abingdon) champions, going on to win the overall Division Two title with an 8–2 win over Wallingford division champions Aston Tirrold, and were promoted to Division One (Wantage). They finished bottom of the division in 1929–30 and were relegated to Division Two (Faringdon & Wantage). The club were transferred to Division Two (Abingdon) in 1933, before being placed in a combined Division Two in 1935. They were Division Two runners-up in 1937–38, earning promotion to Division One. After World War II the club returned to the league in 1946 and were placed in Division Two. League reorganisation saw them placed in Division One (East) in 1947–48 and then back in Division Two the following season. After finishing fourth in Division Two in 1950–51, the club were promoted to Division One. However, after finishing bottom of Division One the following season, they were relegated back to Division Two.

Milton finished bottom of Division Two in 1953–54, after which they left the league and folded. After reforming in 1958, the club rejoined the North Berks League, entering Division Three. They went on to win the Division Three title at the first attempt, earning promotion to Division Two. The following season saw them win the Division Two title, winning all 22 league matches and promotion to Division One. The club went on to secure a third successive promotion when they won the Division One title the following season, earning promotion to the Premier Division. They were Premier Division champions in 1962–63 and retained the title the following season. The club won the Premier Division title again in 1965–66 and 1969–70. The division was renamed Division One in 1974.

In 1978–79 Milton finished second-from-bottom of Division One and were relegated to Division Two. However, they won the Division Two title in 1980–81 and were promoted back to Division One. The club were Division One runners-up in 1984–85 and won the league the following season. After winning the league again in 1987–88 and 1988–89, they moved up to Division One of the Hellenic League. The club were Division One runners-up in their first season in the division, earning promotion to the Premier Division, also winning the Division One League Cup and the Berks & Bucks Intermediate Cup. They went on to win the Premier Division title in 1990–91 and retained the Berks & Bucks Intermediate Cup.

Milton were demoted to Division One in 1994 as they did not have floodlights. They were Division One runners-up in 1994–95, and after moving to a new floodlit ground and finishing fourth in 1998–99, the club were promoted back to the Premier Division. They went on to finish bottom of the Premier Division the following season. Despite avoiding being relegated, the club finished bottom of the Premier Division again in 2000–01 and were relegated to Division One East. A third-place finish in Division One East in 2003–04 saw the club promoted back to the Premier Division. They were relegated back to Division One East at the end of the 2008–09 season.

In 2013–14 Milton won the Division One East title and were promoted to the Premier Division. However, they were relegated from the Premier Division at the end of the 2015–16 season and were placed in Division One West. The club were transferred to Division One East for the 2017–18 season. They went on to finish bottom of the division with only nine points and two wins during the league season. In 2021 Division One East and Division One West were merged into a single Division One. The club finished third in the division in 2022–23, qualifying for the promotion play-offs. After defeating Clanfield 3–2 on penalties after a 3–3 draw in the semi-finals, they beat Hartpury University 4–1 on penalties in the final (after a 2–2 draw) to earn promotion to the Premier Division North of the Combined Counties League.

In April 2026 Milton announced they would be withdrawing from the National League system at the end of the 2025–26 season due to a failure to agree a lease for their ground with the parish council.

== Ground ==
The club moved to Potash Lane in Milton Heights in 1998. The record attendance at the ground of 608 was set on 7 May 2005 when Carterton played Didcot Town in the Hellenic League Cup final.

After failing ground grading in late 2023, the club groundshared with Wallingford & Crowmarsh and then Beaconsfield Town.

== Honours ==
- Hellenic League
  - Premier Division champions 1990–91
  - Division One East champions 2013–14
  - Division One Cup winners 1989–90
- North Berks League
  - Champions 1962–63, 1963–64, 1965–66, 1969–70, 1985–86, 1987–88, 1988–89
  - Division One champions 1960–61
  - Division Two champions 1959–60, 1980–81
  - Division Two (Abingdon) champions 1922–23
  - Division Three champions 1958–59
- Berks & Bucks Intermediate Cup
  - Winners 1989–90, 1990–91

== Records ==
- Best FA Cup performance: First qualifying round, 2014–15
- Best FA Vase performance: Second round, 1993–94, 1994–95, 2004–05, 2024–25
- Most goals: Nigel Mott

== See also ==
- Milton United F.C. players
