= Middle Barton F.C. =

Association football club in England

Middle Barton
- Full name: Middle Barton Football Club
- Founded: 1928
- Dissolved: 2020
- Ground: Middle Barton Sports & Social Club; Middle Barton, Steeple Barton
- Manager: Tim Fowler
- 2019–20: Witney & District League Division One (season abandoned)
Home colours

Middle Barton F.C. was an association football club based in the village of Middle Barton, Steeple Barton, 13 miles (21 km) north of Oxford in Oxfordshire, England. The club is affiliated to the Oxfordshire County Football Association and is a FA Chartered Standard club.

== History ==
The club was founded in 1928. The club played in the Banbury District & Lord Jersey League Football after the Second World War remaining there until the 1990s. They joined the Hellenic Football League Division One in 1999, when they gained promotion from the Oxfordshire Senior Football League the season before. They stayed in the Hellenic league until the 2005–06 season when the club resigned from Division One West. The club then joined Division One of the Oxfordshire Senior Football League the following season, but only stayed for the single season. The club then joined the Witney and District League, starting in Division Three, but folded in 2020.

== Ground ==
Middle Barton play their home games at Middle Barton Sports & Social Club, Worton Road, Middle Barton, Oxfordshire, OX7 7EE.

== Honours ==
- Lord Jersey Cup:
  - Winners (4): 1953–54, 1956–57, 1958–59, 1959–60
  - Runners up (6): 1957–58, 1961–62, 1962–63, 1963–64, 1990–91, 1993–94
- Oxford County Junior Shield:
  - Runners up (6): 1961–62

== Records ==
- Highest league position: 6th in Hellenic League Division One 1999-00
