= Eton Wick F.C. =

Association football club in England

Coordinates: 51°29′45.29″N 0°38′08.73″W

Eton Wick
- Full name: Eton Wick Football Club
- Nickname: The Wick
- Founded: 1881
- Ground: Hayward's Mead, Eton Wick
- Chairman: Dave Miller
- Manager: Colin Jacobs
- League: East Berkshire League Division Two
- 2025–26: East Berkshire League Division One, 7th of 12 (transferred)
Home colours

Eton Wick is a football club based in Eton Wick, England. They currently play in the East Berkshire League Division Two.

== History ==
The club was formed in 1881 as Eton Wick. Eton Wick originally played at Dorney Common, moving to their present ground in 1904. The club at the end of the 1952–53 season were promoted to the Windsor, Slough and District League First Division, and became winners of the Slough Premier Cup. The 1954–55 season saw the club in the premier division and they went on to stay in that division for 37 Seasons, winning the league in the 1974–75 and 1986–87 seasons.

In 1991 they joined the Chiltonian League Division One and reached the 2nd round of the FA Vase in the 1994–95 season. Two seasons later the club then joined the Combined Counties league, but only stayed for 3 seasons, before moving back to the Chiltonian League. The club then played in the Hellenic Football League in Division One, at the start of the 2000–01 season, winning the division once in the 2004–05 season. The club then decided to take a step down to the East Berkshire League Premier Division for the 2010–11 season after it no longer had a Reserve team. The move proved successful with the team making it to the finals of the Maidenhead & Norfolkian Cup and the Slough Town Senior Cup. Eton Wick went on to win the Maidenhead & Norfolkian Cup 1–0 against Slough Heating with Adam Hickey scoring the winning goal. A week later Eton Wick lost the Slough Town Senior Cup Final to Iver 1–0. However, they won the East Berkshire Premier Division. The following season they finished 3rd in the Premier Division but retained their Maidenhead Norfolkian Cup and won the East Berkshire League Cup for the first time. At the end of the 2011–12 season there was a disagreement about the direction of the club and the manager resigned. The club did not enter a team the next season and the manager Steve Evans took over at Wraysbury Village. Eton Wick reformed in 2013 and re-entered the East Berkshire League Premier Division. Between 2014 and 2017 the club played in East Berkshire League Division 1.

In 2018, with the club struggling for players, Eton Wick employed former Willow Wanderers Football Club Manager Colin Jacobs who agreed to fold his own club in favor of a club/team merger with Eton Wick. Now playing in East Berkshire Football League Division 1, the new Eton Wick Manager brought in current goalkeeper and former Willow Wanderers F.C. Assistant Manager Phil O'Brien to help rebuild the team with hopes of reviving the club's successes of years gone by and take them back to the top of the East Berkshire Football League.

In their first season in charge Colin and Phil rebuilt the team and worked hard to finish 4th in Division 2 (Season 2018/19).

In the 2019/20 season the team looked to be going one step further by finishing third in Division 2, however, the season came to an abrupt end due to the COVID-19 Pandemic which swept the country and with the UK government enforcing a 3-month national lockdown, the points were tallied and then scaled back based on a three quarter season, the net result being that the team once again finished 4th in Division 2.

The 2020/21 season was again hit with a second and third national COVID-19 lockdown putting a halt to proceedings in November 2020 with no ball kicked nationwide until April 2021. The league season was then restarted in April 2021, playing all remaining league matches in a 3-month period and extending the league end date by 2 months. Eton Wick team enjoyed a second part of the season and once again finished 4th, for a third consecutive year in EBFL Division 2. fini

== Ground ==
Eton Wick play at Eton Wick Recreation Ground at Haywards Mead, Eton Wick SL4 6JN. The club has played at Eton Wick recreation ground since 1904, having originally played at Dorney Common.

== Honours ==
=== League honours ===
- Hellenic League Division One East:
  - Winners(1): 2004–05
- Chiltonian League Premier division:
  - Winners(2): 1992–93,1998–99
  - Runners-up(1): 1999–00
- Chiltonian League Division one:
  - Winners(2): 1991–92, 1996–97
- East Berkshire Football League Premier Division:
  - Winners(1): 2010–11.
- Windsor, Slough and District League
  - Winners(2): 1974–75, 1986–87

=== Cup honours ===
- Berks and Bucks Senior Trophy
  - Winners(1): 1992–93
- Maidenhead & Norfolkian Cup:
  - Winners(2): 2010–11, 2011–12
- Slough Town Challenge Cup:
  - Winners(5): 1952–53, 1977–78, 1991–92, 1992–93, 1999–00 and 2003–04
- East Berkshire Football League Sid Hurly League Cup:
  - Winners(1): 2011–12
- Windsor, Slough & District League Cup (Senior Section):
  - Winners(1): 1977–78

== Records ==
- Highest League Position: First in Hellenic League Division One East 2004–05
- FA Vase best performance: Second round 1994–95
