= Headington Amateurs F.C. =

Association football club in England

Coordinates: 51°46′11.28″N 1°12′20.44″W

Headington Amateurs
- Full name: Headington Amateurs Football Club
- Nickname: The A's
- Founded: 1949
- Ground: Barton Park, Headington
- Chairman: Donald Light
- Manager: Stuart Bishop
- League: Hellenic League Division Two East
- 2024–25: Hellenic League Division Two Central, 1st of 10
Home colours

Headington Amateurs Football Club is a football club based in Headington, in Oxford, England. Affiliated to the Oxfordshire County Football Association, they are currently members of the Hellenic League Division Two East and play at the Horspath Sports Ground.

== History ==
The club was established in 1949 as Brittania Football Club, named after a pub close to where the team trained. They joined the Oxford City Junior League, in which they played until moving up to the Oxfordshire Senior League in 1966. They won the Division One title in 1968–69, and the league's Clarendon Cup the following season. In 1972–73 the club won the Premier Division title and the President's Cup, retaining both the following season. They went on to win back-to-back league titles in 1975–76 and 1976–77, before winning the Clarendon Cup again in 1978–79.

In 1988 Headington moved up to Division One of the Hellenic League after a merger with the committee of the defunct Morris Motors club. They were Division One runners-up in their first season in the league, earning promotion to the Premier Division. However, they were relegated back to Division One at the end of the 1993–94 season due to a lack of floodlights. When Division One was split into eastern and western sections in 2000, the club were placed in Division One West. They were transferred to Division One East for the 2000–07 season, which saw them win the Oxfordshire Intermediate Cup, but returned to Division One West the following year.

In 2010–11 Headington were Division One West champions, but were unable to take promotion to the Premier Division. They were transferred to Division One East again in 2012, and were runners-up in 2012–13, a season that also saw the club win the league's Supplementary Cup. They were moved to Division One West in 2017. At the end of the 2017–18 season the club were demoted to Division Two West due to the ground not meeting the requirements for their level.

== Ground ==
In 1988 the club moved to the Old Pressed Steel Ground, formerly the home of Pressed Steel. They moved to the Barton Village Road ground in 1990. However, the lack of floodlights led to their relegation from the Premier Division in 1994. In the summer of 2011 the ground had a £350,000 revamp done to its clubhouse so that it met the latest Sport England and Football Association standards. In 2016 they moved to the Horspath Sports Ground. However, they returned to the Barton area, moving into a new ground at Barton Park.

== Honours ==
- Hellenic League
  - Division One West champions 2010–11
  - Supplementary Cup winners 2012–13
- Oxfordshire Senior League
  - Premier Division champions 1972–73, 1973–74, 1975–76, 1976–77
  - Division One champions 1968–69
  - President's Cup winners 1972–73, 1973–74
  - Clarendon Cup winners 1969–70, 1978–79
- Oxfordshire Charity Cup
  - Winners 1975–76
- Oxfordshire Intermediate Cup
  - Winners 2006–07

== Records ==
- Best FA Vase performance: First round, 1989–90
- Record attendance: 250 vs Newport, 1991
- Most appearances: Kent Drackett
- Most goals: Tony Penge
