= Letcombe F.C. =

Association football club in England

Coordinates: 51°34′33.98″N 1°27′27.05″W

Letcombe
- Full name: Letcombe Football Club
- Nickname: The Brooksiders
- Ground: Bassett Road, Letcombe Regis
- Chairman: Dennis Stock
- Manager: Luke Stone
- League: Oxfordshire Senior League Division Five
- 2025–26: Wiltshire League Premier Division, 5th of 17
Home colours	Away colours

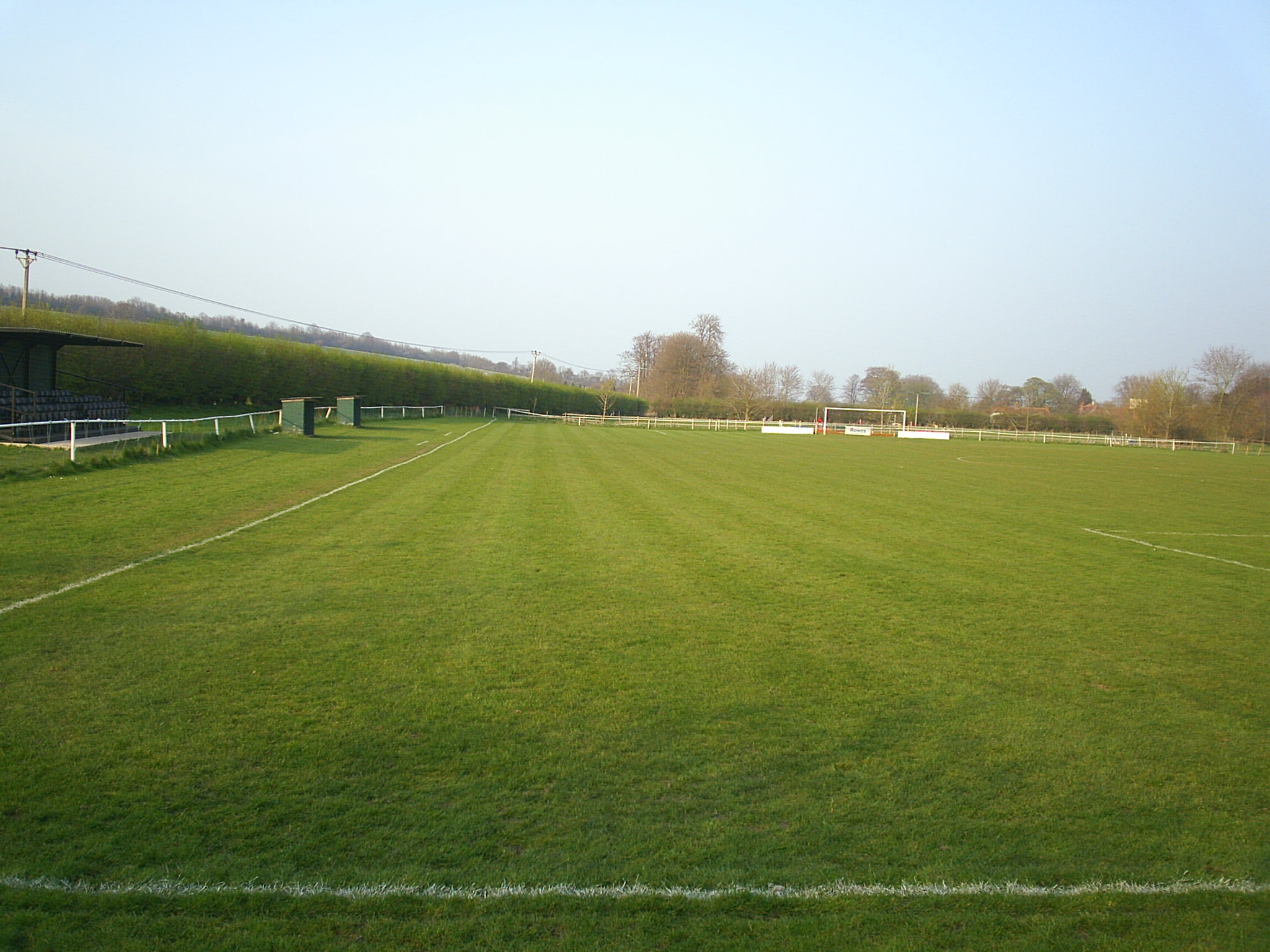
Bassett Road in April 2007

Letcombe Football Club is a football club based in Letcombe Regis, Oxfordshire, England. They are currently member of the Oxfordshire Senior League Division Five and play at Bassett Road.

== History ==
It is unclear when the club was established, but the earliest record of football in the village is from 1910, when the club was members of the Wantage Division of the North Berks League. In 1911 the league was reorganised, with Letcome placed in the Wantage & Faringdon Division. The club won the division and played Abingdon & Wallingford Division champions Radley for the league championship at Challow Park in Wantage, losing 5–3 after extra time. The following season saw both Letcome and Radley win their divisions again; after the championship match ended 1–1 after extra time, the title was shared.

Following World War I, Letcome did not return to the league for the 1919–20 season, but rejoined the following season amid league expansion, and were placed in Division Two (Wantage). The club left the league at the end of the season, returning again in 1923–24 and re-entering Division Two (Wantage). Despite only finishing fourth, they were promoted to Division One (Wantage). The club were runners-up in the division the following season, but finished bottom of the division in 1928–29, and subsequently left the league.

In 1946 a Letcome Regis club joined Division Two of the North Berks League. Following league reorganisation, they were placed in Division One (West) for the 1947–48 season and went on to finish bottom of the division, after which the club left the league and later folded. After being reformed in 1961, they joined Division Three of the North Berks League. Despite only finishing fourth in Division Three in 1962–63, the club were promoted to Division One the following season as Division Three was disbanded. They finished bottom of Division One in 1964–65, but were not relegated as the division was expanded from ten to fourteen clubs. However, after finishing in the bottom three the following season, the club were relegated to Division Two.

The 1969–70 season saw Letcome finish bottom of Division Two. They finished bottom again in 1971–72 and were relegated to Division Three. Despite finishing in the top half of Division Three in 1973–74, the club were relegated to Division Four. The following season saw them finish second-from-bottom of Division Four, resulting in relegation to Division Five. In 1977–78 the club finished third in Division Five and were promoted to Division Four. They were promoted again the following season after another third-place finish, moving back up to Division Three.

In 1983–84 Letcome were Division Three runners-up, earning promotion to Division Two. The following season saw them win the Division Two title and promotion to Division One. In 1989–90 the club were Division One champions, remaining unbeaten during the league season. They then moved up to Division One of the Chiltonian League. The club won Division One at the first attempt, earning promotion to the Premier Division.

In 1993 Letcome transferred to Division One of the Hellenic League. When the league was restructured in 2000, they were placed in Division One West, before being transferred to Division One East in 2002. The club were Division One East runners-up in 2003–04, but were unable to take promotion due to a lack of floodlights at their ground. Three seasons later they were moved back into the West division, where the club remained until being moved back into the East division in 2011. In 2012 they were moved back to Division One West. At the end of the 2017–18 season the club were demoted to Division Two West due to the ground not meeting the requirements for their level. However, the club withdrew from the league shortly before the start of the 2018–19 season, with the first team taking over from the reserves in Division Three of the North Berks League.

Letcome won Division Three at the first attempt, and transferred to Division Two West of the Hellenic League. After one season they were moved to Division Two South. After finishing as runners-up in Division Two South in 2022–23 they were transferred to Division Two Central, which they won the following season. In 2024 they transferred to the Premier Division of the Wiltshire League. At the end of the 2025–26 season the club dropped into Division Five of the Oxfordshire Senior League.

== Honours ==
- Hellenic League
  - Division Two Central champions 2023–24
- Chiltonian League
  - Division One champions 1990–91
- North Berks League
  - Champions 1912–13 (shared), 1989–90
  - Division Two champions 1984–85
  - Division Three champions 2018–19
  - Wantage & Faringdon Division champions 1911–12, 1912–13
- North Berks Cup
  - Winners 1987–88
- Faringdon Thursday Memorial Cup
  - Winners 1986–87, 1997–98, 1998–99, 1999–2000, 2002–03, 2004–05, 2005–06, 2022–23, 2023-24

== Records ==
- Record attendance: 238 vs Didcot Town Development, Hellenic League Division Two Central, 23 March 2024
