= Harrow Hill F.C. =

Association football club in England

Harrow Hill
- Full name: Harrow Hill Football Club
- Nicknames: Harry Hill; The Hillmen; The Hill
- Founded: 1932
- Ground: Larksfield Road, Harrow Hill
- Capacity: Approx. 500
- Chairman: Sean Thomas
- Manager: Craig Broadman & Jamie Knight
- League: Gloucestershire Northern Senior League Division 2
- 2025–26: 6th (out of 15)
Home colours

Harrow Hill A.F.C. is an English football club which is based in the village of Harrow Hill, Gloucestershire, nearby Drybrook. The club are currently members of the Gloucestershire Northern Senior League Division Two and play at Larksfield Road. The club also have three other senior men's teams that play in the North Gloucestershire Football League and are affiliated to the Gloucestershire County FA.

== History ==
Established in 1932, the club joined the Gloucestershire County League in 1982. After finishing runners up in 1994–95, they were promoted to Division One of the Hellenic League. They finished third in 1994–95, earning promotion to the Premier Division. Despite finishing in the bottom three every season, the club avoided relegation until 2001–02, when they went back down to Division One West.

The club finished runners up in 2005–06, earning promotion back to the Premier Division.

The club resigned from the Hellenic League in November 2009 due to financial challenges, and took their Reserve Team's place in Division Two of the Gloucester Northern Senior League. In the season of 2010–11 the club were very likely to be promoted and did so, just being pipped as champions by Frampton FC. The club went on to play in Division One of the Gloucestershire Northern Senior League for the season of 2011–12.

After the premiership of Steve Boseley in charge of the first team, the club has struggled to gain a foothold in local football as they had done during the end of the 20th and beginning of the 21st centuries. Many former players have taken charge since including Martin Reid and Darren Weyman but without any major success.

The current First Team Manager's are Craig Broadman and Jamie Knight who took charge in June 2026, with Knight joining Broadman on the management team. The club successfully runs four open age teams, with the Reserves, Thirds and Fourths competing between the Premier Division to Division 3 of the North Gloucestershire Association Football League.

A famous fan of the club is comedian Harry Hill, whose name is also a nickname of the club (Harry Hill being a former name of Harrow Hill). Harry was presented with a club badge in 2008, and has worn it on his programme Harry Hill's TV Burp.

== First XI Honours ==
- Hellenic Football League Division One West, Runners Up – 1994–1995
- Hellenic Football League Division One West, Runners Up – 2005–2006
- GFA County Cup, Winners – 2010–11
- Gloucestershire Northern Senior League Division Two, Runners Up – 2010–11

== Records ==
- Best Club performance: Hellenic Football League Premier Division, 21st – 2007–08
- Record Gate: 268 vs Slimbridge A.F.C. – Sunday, 27 August 2006
