= Purton F.C. =

Association football club in England

Coordinates: 51°35′15.40″N 1°51′53.99″W

Purton
- Full name: Purton Football Club
- Nickname: The Reds
- Founded: 1924
- Ground: The Red House, Purton
- 2024–25: Wiltshire League Division One, 15th of 15
Home colours	Away colours

Purton F.C. are a football club based in Purton, near Swindon, in Wiltshire, England. They play in the Wiltshire League Division One.

== History ==
Purton Football Club was established in 1924. They played in the FA Cup in the six seasons preceding the Second World War, but never advanced further than the Preliminary Round. They joined the Hellenic Football League Division One in 1986 and won that division in 1995–96. After some league restructuring, they were placed in Division One West which they won in 2003–04, but on neither occasion was the team promoted to the Premier Division due to not meeting the relevant ground criteria (primarily regarding floodlights).

The club stepped down to the Wiltshire Senior League for 2017–18. After finishing bottom of the league's Premier Division in 2021–22, they were relegated to the newly formed Division 1 for the 2022–23 season.

== Ground ==
Purton play their home games at The Red House, Purton, Wiltshire, SN5 4DY.

== Honours ==
- Hellenic Football League Division One West
  - Champions 2003–04
- Hellenic Football League Division One
  - Champions 1995–96
- Wiltshire County FA Senior Cup
  - Winners (7) 1938–39, 1948–49, 1950–51, 1954–55, 1987–88, 1988–89, 1994–95
  - Runners up (2) 1997–98, 1999–2000

== Records ==
- FA Cup
  - Preliminary Round 1945–46, 1946–47, 1947–48, 1949–50, 1950–51
