= Cirencester United F.C. =

English football club

Cirencester United
- Full name: Cirencester United Football Club
- Nickname: The Herd
- Founded: 1969 (as The Herd)
- Dissolved: 2010
- Ground: South Cerney Army Camp, Cirencester
- 2009–10: Hellenic Football League; Division One West, 16th
Home colours

Cirencester United F.C. was a football club based in Cirencester, England. They were established in 1969 as The Herd. In 1990, they changed to their present name. They joined the Hellenic Football League Division One in 1987. For the 2008–09 season, they were members of the Hellenic Football League Division One West. Cirencester United also operated a reserve side which, for the 2008–09 season, competed in the Hellenic Football League Reserve Division Two (West). Their former clubhouse at the 'Four Acres' field on Chesterton Lane was destroyed by fire in 2007, so Ciren United moved to play home games from The Army Camp, South Cerney.

== History ==
Cirencester United was formed in 1969 by Reverend Adam Ford. Ford, an Australian, was a curate of Cirencester Parish Church. He was later Chaplain to St Paul's School, London and Chaplain in Ordinary to the Queen at the Chapel Royal.

Named "The Herd", the club was initially a youth side; created by Rev. Ford to provide talented local footballers with a team in which to play. The side progressed from youth football to compete in the Cirencester and District League, where they would be crowned champions two consecutive seasons. The Herd's progression continued in the Cheltenham League where quick-fire promotions eventually resulted in entry to the Hellenic Football League in 1987. By this time, the club had also set up a reserve side that followed the success of the 1st team by winning the local leagues. Success in the league was also reflected by cup success, including lifting the Gloucestershire Senior Amateur Cup in the 1989–90 season.

In 1990, the club was renamed from "The Herd" to "Cirencester United".

During their time in Hellenic, United won two Reserve League Division Two championships, firstly in 1995 and later in 2002–03 where the club also won the Reserve Division cup in a double-winning season.

In 2003–04 United began a ground-sharing agreement with Cirencester Town, which saw all first-team games played at the Town's Corinium Stadium. However, for the 2007–08 season, United reverted to their spiritual home of the 'Four Acres', only to see it destroyed by fire early in the campaign. The club then played at South Cerney next to the airfield. For the start of the 2008–09 season, the pitch at South Cerney had permanent barriers installed around the playing area.

Several of United's players went on to play football at a higher level; e.g. striker Richie Miles played for Hellenic League Wootton Bassett.

After the loss of their premises and a disastrous season with one win in 30 games, and lacking a chairman, secretary, and committee, the club folded in 2010.

== Honours ==
- Cirencester and District League
  - Champions 1974–75
- Cirencester and District League Cup
  - Winners 1974–75

== Club records ==
- The record attendance for a Cirencester United home fixture is 310 (set on Sunday 24 August 2008 in the Hellenic League match against Malmesbury Victoria at South Cerney).
- Best league performance: 7th in Hellenic League Division One West, 2000–01
