= Carterton F.C. =

Association football club in England

Coordinates: 51.776039°N 1.6009328°W

Carterton
- Full name: Carterton Football Club
- Founded: 1918
- Ground: Kilkenny Lane, Carterton
- Capacity: 1,500
- Chairman: Phil Godfrey
- League: Hellenic League Division One
- 2025–26: Hellenic League Division One, 14th of 18
Home colours	Away colours

Carterton Football Club is a football club based in Carterton, Oxfordshire, England. They are currently members of the Hellenic League Division One and play at Kilkenny Lane.

== History ==
The club was founded in 1918, and initially played in the Witney & District League. They won the Premier Division title in 1960–61 and 1965–66. In 1976–77 the club were Division One champions. In 1982 the club was taken over by the Carterton Boys club and was renamed Carterton Town. After winning the Division One title again in 1984–85, they won the Oxfordshire Junior Cup in 1985–86. The club then moved up to Division One of the Hellenic League. After winning Division One in 1989–90 the club were promoted to the Premier Division.

Carterton were relegated back to Division One at the end of the 1991–92 season, but won the division again in 1993–94 to return to the Premier Division. In 1998–99 they finished as Premier Division runners-up, and went on to win the league's Supplementary Cup in 1999–2000 and the Challenge Cup in 2000–01. In 2005 the club reverted to the name Carterton Football Club. They remained in the Premier Division until being relegated to Division One West at the end of the 2010–11 season. Although they won Division One West in 2015–16 and were promoted to the Premier Division, the club withdrew from the league in September 2016 after their manager resigned and several players left. They returned to Division Two West of the league the following season.

After a fourth-place finish in Division Two West in 2017–18, Carterton moved up to Division One West. However, they resigned from the league after three matches the following season. The club was subsequently placed in the Premier Division of the Witney & District League for the 2019–20 season. After one season in the Witney & District League they transferred to Division Two South of the Hellenic League, before joining the Premier Division of the Oxfordshire Senior League in 2023. They won the Premier Division title in 2023–24 and were promoted to Division One of the Hellenic League.

== Ground ==
The club originally played at Alvescot Road Recreation Ground. During the 1984–85 season they moved to Kilkenny Lane, which was officially opened by Lou Macari and Jim Smith in March 1985.

== Honours ==
- Hellenic League
  - Division One champions 1989–90, 1993–94
  - Division One West champions 2015–16
  - Challenge Cup winners 2000–01
  - Supplementary Cup winners 1999–2000
- Oxfordshire Senior League
  - Premier Division champions 2023–24
- Witney & District League
  - Premier Division champions 1960–61, 1965–66
  - Division One champions 1976–77, 1984–85
  - George Dingle Memorial Cup winners 1966–67, 1967–68, 1976–77, 1982–83, 1984–85
- Oxfordshire Junior Shield
  - Winners 1985–86

== Records ==
- Best FA Cup performance: Second qualifying round, 2000–01
- Best FA Vase performance: Third round, 2000–01
- Most goals: Phil Rodney
- Record attendance: 650 vs Swindon Town, friendly match, July 2001

== See also ==
- Carterton F.C. players
- Carterton F.C. managers
