= 1992–93 Hellenic Football League =

The 1992–93 Hellenic Football League season was the 40th in the history of the Hellenic Football League, a football competition in England.

== Premier Division ==
Hellenic Football League Premier Division
- Season: 1992–93
- Champions: Wollen Sports
- Relegated: Pegasus Juniors; Didcot Town
- Matches: 306
- Goals: 978 (3.2 per match)

The Premier Division featured 16 clubs which competed in the division last season, along with two new clubs, promoted from Division One:

- Wantage Town
- Wollen Sports

Also, Swindon Athletic merged with Division One club Supermarine to create Swindon Supermarine.

=== League table ===
Pos	Team	Pld	W	D	L	GF	GA	GD	Pts	Promotion or relegation
1	Wollen Sports	34	25	4	5	75	31	+44	79	
2	Moreton Town	34	22	4	8	79	43	+36	70	
3	Milton United	34	21	7	6	67	33	+34	70	
4	Cirencester Town	34	20	8	6	54	28	+26	68	
5	Cinderford Town	34	15	10	9	64	44	+20	55	
6	Almondsbury Picksons	34	15	7	12	62	50	+12	52	
7	Shortwood United	34	12	10	12	63	59	+4	46	
8	Swindon Supermarine	34	11	13	10	46	43	+3	46	
9	Bicester Town	34	12	9	13	45	45	0	45	
10	Rayners Lane	34	13	4	17	53	63	−10	43	
11	Banbury United	34	10	10	14	50	66	−16	40	
12	Fairford Town	34	8	13	13	55	48	+7	37	
13	Headington Amateurs	34	10	6	18	40	67	−27	36	
14	Kintbury Rangers	34	9	8	17	35	51	−16	35	
15	Abingdon United	34	9	7	18	49	67	−18	34	
16	Wantage Town	34	8	8	18	47	70	−23	32	
17	Pegasus Juniors	34	7	9	18	52	76	−24	30	Relegated to Division One
18	Didcot Town	34	6	9	19	42	94	−52	27	Relegated to Division One

Source: fchd
Rules for classification: 1) points; 2) goal difference; 3) number of goals scored.

== Division One ==
Hellenic Football League Division One
- Season: 1992–93
- Champions: Tuffley Rovers
- Promoted: Tuffley Rovers; North Leigh
- Matches: 240
- Goals: 932 (3.88 per match)

Division One featured 14 clubs which competed in the division last season, along with two new clubs, relegated from the Premier Division:

- Bishop's Cleeve
- Carterton Town

=== League table ===
Pos	Team	Pld	W	D	L	GF	GA	GD	Pts	Promotion or relegation
1	Tuffley Rovers	30	25	2	3	90	24	+66	77	Promoted to the Premier Division
2	North Leigh	30	21	4	5	113	43	+70	67	Promoted to the Premier Division
3	Wallingford Town	30	17	9	4	84	47	+37	60	
4	Lambourn Sports	30	16	6	8	73	61	+12	54	
5	Purton	30	17	3	10	64	53	+11	54	
6	Kidlington	30	13	9	8	49	41	+8	48	
7	Yarnton	30	12	4	14	48	60	−12	40	
8	Cheltenham Saracens	30	12	2	16	48	47	+1	38	
9	Carterton Town	30	11	4	15	58	63	−5	37	
10	Clanfield	30	9	10	11	47	66	−19	37	
11	Highworth Town	30	9	6	15	48	62	−14	33	
12	Wootton Bassett Town	30	8	6	16	40	53	−13	30	
13	Bishop's Cleeve	30	9	3	18	44	76	−32	30	
14	Cirencester United	30	8	4	18	41	78	−37	28	
15	Chipping Norton Town	30	7	5	18	51	82	−31	26	Resigned from the league
16	Easington Sports	30	5	5	20	34	76	−42	20	

Source: fchd
Rules for classification: 1) points; 2) goal difference; 3) number of goals scored.
