= List of Swindon Supermarine F.C. seasons =

Swindon Supermarine Football Club, a semi-professional association football club based in South Marston, Swindon, Wiltshire, England, was founded in 1992 as a merger between Supermarine and Swindon Athletic Football Clubs, both playing in the Hellenic Football League. Both clubs had problems, Supermarine finished bottom of Hellenic League Division One in the 1991–92 season and Swindon Athletic were having difficulties meeting the new ground grading requirements at their Swindon Borough Council owned Southbrook Recreation ground. So the two clubs agreed to merge and took Swindon Athletic's place in the Hellenic League Premier Division.

The new club won the Hellenic League Premier Division title on two occasions in their nine-season stay in the division. During their time in the Hellenic Football League, the club participated in the FA Vase each season; their furthest runs in the competition involved reaching the Second Round on two occasions in 1998–99 and 1999–2000.

In 2001 they joined the Southern Football League Division One West and became eligible to participate in the FA Cup, and in the FA Trophy instead of the FA Vase. At the end of the 2005–06 season the club took part in its first play-off tournament after finishing fifth in the Western Division; promotion was not achieved as they were eliminated in the semi-finals by Hemel Hempstead Town and were instead transferred to the newly formed Division One South & West. The club achieved immediate promotion from the new division after a fourth-place finish and subsequent play-off win, defeating Burnham in the semi-final and Taunton Town in the final. After four mid-table finishes in the Premier Division, Swindon Supermarine experienced relegation for the first time in their short history in 2011–12 finishing 21st of 22 and returning to Division One South & West. This division was renamed back to Division One West in 2017, and in 2018 the club were promoted into Premier Division South. Their best run in the FA Cup came in the 2010–11 season when they reached the Second Round proper where they lost at League One side Colchester United. This has been the only time the club has progressed through the qualifying rounds. Swindon Supermarine reached the third round proper (last sixteen) of the FA Trophy, their furthest run in the competition, on three occasions in 2008–09, 2020–21 and 2022–23.

As at the end of 2025–26, the club's first team had spent twelve seasons in the seventh tier of English football, thirteenth in the eighth tier and nine in the ninth tier. The table below details their achievements in first-team competitions for each completed season since their first appearance in the Hellenic Football League Premier Division in 1992–93.

== Key ==
Key to divisions

- Hellenic Premier = Hellenic Football League Premier Division
- Southern Premier = Southern Football League Premier Division
- Southern Premier South = Southern Football League Premier Division South
- Southern Div 1 S&W = Southern Football League Division One South & West
- Southern Div 1 South = Southern Football League Division One South
- Southern Div 1 West = Southern Football League Division One West

Key to positions and symbols

- 1st = Champions
- ↑ = Promoted
- ↓ = Relegated

Key to rounds

- — = Not eligible to enter
- EP = Extra preliminary round
- PRE = Preliminary round
- QR1 = First qualifying round, etc.
- R1 = First round, etc.

== Seasons ==
Season	League record									FA Cup	FA Trophy	Other	
Season	Division (Note: Divisions are sorted according to their level within the English football league system at the time.)	P	W	D	L	F	A	Pts	Pos	FA Cup	FA Trophy	Competition	Result
1992–93	Hellenic Premier	34	11	13	10	46	43	46	8th	—N/a	—N/a	FA Vase	EP
1993–94	Hellenic Premier	34	16	6	12	64	42	51 (Note: Three points deducted.)	8th	—N/a	—N/a	FA Vase	PRE
1994–95	Hellenic Premier	30	16	4	10	76	44	52	3rd	—N/a	—N/a	FA Vase	PRE
1995–96	Hellenic Premier	34	20	3	11	82	33	63	6th	—N/a	—N/a	FA Vase	R1
1996–97	Hellenic Premier	34	21	5	8	72	40	68	4th	—N/a	—N/a	FA Vase	QR2
1997–98	Hellenic Premier	34	27	3	4	83	20	84	1st	—N/a	—N/a	FA Vase	R1
1998–99	Hellenic Premier	36	10	9	17	41	59	39	14th	—N/a	—N/a	FA Vase	R2
1999–2000	Hellenic Premier	36	23	4	9	74	27	73	3rd	—N/a	—N/a	FA Vase	R2
2000–01	Hellenic Premier ↑	38	29	4	5	86	29	91	1st	—N/a	—N/a	FA Vase	R1
2001–02	Southern Div 1 West	40	11	4	25	52	76	37	19th	QR2	R1	Southern Football League Cup	TBC
2002–03	Southern Div 1 West	42	11	5	26	52	85	38	19th	PRE	R1	Southern Football League Cup	TBC
2003–04	Southern Div 1 West	40	10	9	21	41	69	39	17th	QR1	R2	Southern Football League Cup	TBC
2004–05	Southern Div 1 West	42	12	12	18	43	60	48	19th	QR1	PRE	Southern Football League Cup	TBC
2005–06	Southern Div 1 West	42	22	9	11	70	47	75	5th (Note: Lost in the play-off semi-final to Hemel Hempstead Town 3–0.)	QR2	QR1	Southern Football League Cup	TBC
2006–07	Southern Div 1 S&W ↑	42	20	11	11	68	40	71	4th (Note: Promoted to the Southern Football League Premier Division via the play-offs, beating Burnham 2–1 in the semi-final and Taunton Town 2–0 in the final.)	QR1	QR2	Southern Football League Cup	R1
2007–08	Southern Premier	42	14	12	16	51	67	54	12th	QR1	QR1	Southern Football League Cup	QF
2008–09	Southern Premier	42	15	12	15	59	61	57	13th	QR1	R3	Southern Football League Cup	SF
2009–10	Southern Premier	42	10	14	18	48	76	44	14th	QR1	QR1	Southern Football League Cup	TBC
2010–11	Southern Premier	40	17	7	16	56	58	58	10th	R2	QR3	Southern Football League Cup	R1
2011–12	Southern Premier ↓	42	11	11	20	50	86	44	21st	QR2	R1	Southern Football League Cup	R3
2012–13	Southern Div 1 S&W	42	25	6	11	79	51	81	4th (Note: Lost in the play-offs semi-final to Merthyr Town 3–2 in a penalty shoot-out after the match had finished 2–2 after extra time.)	QR1	QR1	Southern Football League Cup	R1
2013–14	Southern Div 1 S&W	42	24	7	11	91	52	79	5th (Note: Lost in the play-offs semi-final to Merthyr Town 5–2.)	PRE	QR1	Southern Football League Cup	R2
2014–15	Southern Div 1 S&W	42	17	5	20	81	79	56	14th	QR2	PRE	Southern Football League Cup	QF
2015–16	Southern Div 1 S&W	42	27	6	9	81	42	87	4th (Note: Lost in the play-offs semi-final to Taunton Town 2–1.)	QR1	QR2	Southern Football League Cup	R1
2016–17	Southern Div 1 S&W	42	21	9	12	85	57	72	6th	QR3	QR1	Southern Football League Cup	R1
2017–18	Southern Div 1 West ↑	42	21	11	10	86	54	74	5th (Note: Promoted via the play-offs, beating Evesham United in the semi-final and Wimborne Town 4–3 in a penalty shoot-out in the 2018 Southern League West Division play-off Final after the match had finished 0–0 after extra time.)	QR3	QR1	Southern Football League Cup	R1
2018–19	Southern Premier South	42	16	10	16	70	59	58	11th	QR2	QR1	Southern Football League Cup	R1
2019–20	Southern Premier South	32	17	6	9	50	41	57	4th (Note: As a result of the COVID-19 pandemic, this season's Southern Football League was formally abandoned on 26 March 2020, with all results from the season being expunged, and no promotion or relegation taking place.)	QR2	QR1	Southern Football League Cup	R3
2020–21	Southern Premier South	7	4	0	3	12	10	12	6th (Note: As a result of the COVID-19 pandemic, this season's Southern Football League was curtailed on 24 February 2021, with all results from the season being expunged. A restructuring of non-league football is scheduled to take place before the start of the 2021–22 season.)	QR2	R3	—	—
2021–22	Southern Premier South	42	16	9	17	63	63	57	12th	QR1	QR3	Southern Football League Cup	SF
2022–23	Southern Premier South	42	23	8	11	88	66	77	6th	QR3	R3	—	—
2023–24	Southern Premier South	42	13	10	19	73	92	49	16th	QR1	R1	—	—
2024–25	Southern Premier South ↓	42	12	8	22	60	78	44	20th	QR1	QR3	—	—
2025–26	Southern Div 1 South	42	13	11	18	63	61	50	12th	QR2	QR2	—	—
