= 1993–94 Hellenic Football League =

The 1993–94 Hellenic Football League season was the 41st in the history of the Hellenic Football League, a football competition in England.

== Premier Division ==
Hellenic Football League Premier Division
- Season: 1993–94
- Champions: Moreton Town
- Matches: 306
- Goals: 1,031 (3.37 per match)

The Premier Division featured 16 clubs which competed in the division last season, along with two new clubs, promoted from Division One:

- North Leigh
- Tuffley Rovers

Also, Almondsbury Picksons changed name to Almondsbury Town.

=== League table ===
Pos	Team	Pld	W	D	L	GF	GA	GD	Pts	Promotion or relegation
1	Moreton Town	34	25	6	3	74	21	+53	81	
2	Shortwood United	34	21	6	7	66	48	+18	69	
3	Banbury United	34	18	9	7	74	44	+30	63	
4	Wantage Town	34	18	9	7	68	38	+30	63	Demoted to Division One
5	Fairford Town	34	18	7	9	76	51	+25	61	
6	Cinderford Town	34	17	6	11	57	39	+18	57	
7	Bicester Town	34	17	6	11	64	48	+16	57	
8	Swindon Supermarine	34	16	6	12	64	42	+22	51 (Note: Swindon Supermarine were deducted three points.)	
9	Rayners Lane	34	13	7	14	64	53	+11	46	Demoted to Division One
10	Tuffley Rovers	34	14	4	16	60	53	+7	46	
11	Milton United	34	13	6	15	59	58	+1	45	Demoted to Division One
12	Abingdon United	34	12	8	14	60	57	+3	44	
13	Cirencester Town	34	12	4	18	53	62	−9	40	
14	North Leigh	34	10	9	15	60	58	+2	39	
15	Almondsbury Town	34	10	7	17	38	61	−23	37	
16	Headington Amateurs	34	7	11	16	43	77	−34	32	Demoted to Division One
17	Wollen Sports	34	4	6	24	34	95	−61	18	Resigned from the league
18	Kintbury Rangers	34	2	1	31	17	126	−109	7	

Source: fchd
Rules for classification: 1) points; 2) goal difference; 3) number of goals scored.

== Division One ==
Hellenic Football League Division One
- Season: 1993–94
- Champions: Carterton Town
- Promoted: Carterton Town; Pegasus Juniors; Highworth Town
- Matches: 306
- Goals: 1,063 (3.47 per match)

Division One featured 13 clubs which competed in the division last season, along with five new clubs.

- Clubs, relegated from the Premier Division:
  - Didcot Town
  - Pegasus Juniors
- Plus:
  - Ardley United, joined from the Oxfordshire Senior League
  - Hallen, joined from the Gloucestershire County League
  - Letcombe, joined from the Chiltonian League

=== League table ===
Pos	Team	Pld	W	D	L	GF	GA	GD	Pts	Promotion or relegation
1	Carterton Town	34	21	8	5	82	27	+55	71	Promoted to the Premier Division
2	Pegasus Juniors	34	21	6	7	86	44	+42	69	Promoted to the Premier Division
3	Highworth Town	34	20	8	6	58	30	+28	68	Promoted to the Premier Division
4	Lambourn Sports	34	17	10	7	65	38	+27	61	
5	Bishop's Cleeve	34	17	8	9	79	54	+25	59	
6	Hallen	34	16	10	8	62	50	+12	58	
7	Easington Sports	34	15	9	10	66	49	+17	54	
8	Wallingford Town	34	14	11	9	74	54	+20	53	
9	Wootton Bassett Town	34	15	8	11	65	57	+8	53	
10	Cheltenham Saracens	34	14	9	11	63	50	+13	51	
11	Ardley United	34	12	11	11	59	50	+9	47	
12	Kidlington	34	10	8	16	52	68	−16	38	
13	Purton	34	10	7	17	52	74	−22	37	
14	Cirencester United	34	8	7	19	50	81	−31	31	
15	Didcot Town	34	9	2	23	49	97	−48	29	
16	Yarnton	34	8	4	22	43	85	−42	26 (Note: Yarnton were deducted two points.)	
17	Clanfield	34	4	9	21	32	75	−43	21	
18	Letcombe	34	6	3	25	26	80	−54	21	

Source: fchd
Rules for classification: 1) points; 2) goal difference; 3) number of goals scored.
