= 1994–95 Hellenic Football League =

The 1994–95 Hellenic Football League season was the 42nd in the history of the Hellenic Football League, a football competition in England.

== Premier Division ==
Hellenic Football League Premier Division
- Season: 1994–95
- Champions: Cinderford Town
- Promoted: Cinderford Town
- Matches: 240
- Goals: 908 (3.78 per match)

The Premier Division featured 13 clubs which competed in the division last season, along with four new clubs.

- Clubs, promoted from Division One:
  - Carterton Town
  - Highworth Town
  - Pegasus Juniors
- Plus:
  - Brackley Town, transferred from the United Counties League

=== League table ===
Pos	Team	Pld	W	D	L	GF	GA	GD	Pts	Promotion or relegation
1	Cinderford Town	30	23	4	3	118	24	+94	73	Promoted to the Southern Football League
2	Fairford Town	30	21	4	5	73	25	+48	67	
3	Swindon Supermarine	30	16	4	10	76	44	+32	52	
4	North Leigh	30	15	7	8	55	39	+16	52	
5	Shortwood United	30	16	3	11	60	53	+7	51	
6	Cirencester Town	30	15	5	10	56	43	+13	50	
7	Tuffley Rovers	30	14	7	9	65	44	+21	49	
8	Banbury United	30	12	7	11	44	44	0	43	
9	Pegasus Juniors	30	11	9	10	49	43	+6	42	Demoted to Division One
10	Bicester Town	30	12	6	12	70	60	+10	40 (Note: Bicester Town were deducted two points.)	
11	Abingdon United	30	11	5	14	55	58	−3	38	
12	Almondsbury Town	30	10	7	13	49	53	−4	37	
13	Carterton Town	30	7	9	14	36	60	−24	30	
14	Brackley Town	30	7	5	18	42	80	−38	26	
15	Highworth Town	30	2	6	22	30	93	−63	12	
16	Kintbury Rangers	30	3	2	25	30	145	−115	11	
17	Moreton Town	0	0	0	0	0	0	0	0	Club folded, record expunged

Source: fchd
Rules for classification: 1) points; 2) goal difference; 3) number of goals scored.

== Division One ==
Hellenic Football League Division One
- Season: 1994–95
- Champions: Endsleigh
- Promoted: Endsleigh; Lambourn Sports; Didcot Town
- Matches: 380
- Goals: 1,474 (3.88 per match)

Division One featured 15 clubs which competed in the division last season, along with five new clubs.

- Clubs, demoted from the Premier Division:
  - Headington Amateurs
  - Milton United
  - Rayners Lane
  - Wantage Town
- Plus:
  - Endsleigh, joined from the Gloucestershire County League

=== League table ===
Pos	Team	Pld	W	D	L	GF	GA	GD	Pts	Promotion or relegation
1	Endsleigh	38	28	8	2	88	27	+61	92	Promoted to the Premier Division
2	Milton United	38	30	1	7	114	44	+70	91	
3	Lambourn Sports	38	28	5	5	131	42	+89	89	Promoted to the Premier Division
4	Hallen	38	26	4	8	91	41	+50	82	
5	Rayners Lane	38	21	6	11	84	46	+38	69	
6	Purton	38	19	9	10	70	48	+22	66	
7	Wantage Town	38	17	11	10	86	59	+27	62	
8	Kidlington	38	18	6	14	74	81	−7	60	
9	Wootton Bassett Town	38	18	5	15	67	68	−1	59	
10	Didcot Town	38	16	8	14	77	62	+15	56	Promoted to the Premier Division
11	Easington Sports	38	16	8	14	78	68	+10	56	
12	Wallingford Town	38	13	7	18	70	88	−18	46	Merged into AFC Wallingford
13	Bishop's Cleeve	38	13	6	19	84	86	−2	45	
14	Ardley United	38	13	6	19	78	90	−12	45	
15	Headington Amateurs	38	11	9	18	59	75	−16	42	
16	Cheltenham Saracens	38	11	8	19	67	67	0	41	
17	Clanfield	38	10	2	26	48	82	−34	32	
18	Letcombe	38	5	6	27	32	112	−80	21	
19	Cirencester United	38	5	5	28	46	102	−56	20	
20	Yarnton	38	1	2	35	30	186	−156	5	

Source: fchd
Rules for classification: 1) points; 2) goal difference; 3) number of goals scored.
