= 1983–84 Hellenic Football League =

The 1983–84 Hellenic Football League season was the 31st in the history of the Hellenic Football League, a football competition in England.

== Premier Division ==
Hellenic Football League Premier Division
- Season: 1983–84
- Champions: Almondsbury Greenway
- Relegated: Avon Bradford; Hazells
- Matches: 272
- Goals: 741 (2.72 per match)

The Premier Division featured 14 clubs which competed in the division last season, along with three new clubs:

- Avon Bradford
- Rayners Lane, promoted from Division One
- Supermarine, promoted from Division One

=== League table ===
Pos	Team	Pld	W	D	L	GF	GA	GD	Pts	Promotion or relegation
1	Almondsbury Greenway	32	23	4	5	59	19	+40	73	
2	Moreton Town	32	18	11	3	51	10	+41	65	
3	Thame United	32	19	5	8	53	30	+23	62	
4	Abingdon United	32	16	9	7	68	34	+34	57	
5	Abingdon Town	32	14	9	9	53	38	+15	51	
6	Rayners Lane	32	13	9	10	38	40	−2	48	
7	Supermarine	32	11	12	9	40	34	+6	45	
8	Bicester Town	32	13	6	13	37	32	+5	45	
9	Didcot Town	32	10	10	12	39	49	−10	40	
10	Wallingford Town	32	10	9	13	42	45	−3	39	
11	Clanfield	32	7	16	9	39	43	−4	37	
12	Maidenhead Town	32	8	12	12	40	44	−4	36	
13	Northwood	32	9	7	16	34	53	−19	34	Transferred to the London Spartan League
14	Fairford Town	32	7	12	13	39	57	−18	33	
15	Wantage Town	32	8	6	18	43	53	−10	30	
16	Avon Bradford	32	7	7	18	36	71	−35	28	Relegated to Division One
17	Hazells	32	3	8	21	30	89	−59	17	Relegated to Division One

Source: fchd
Rules for classification: 1) points; 2) goal difference; 3) number of goals scored.

== Division One ==
Hellenic Football League Division One
- Season: 1983–84
- Champions: Morris Motors
- Promoted: Morris Motors; Shortwood United
- Matches: 306
- Goals: 1,079 (3.53 per match)

Division One featured 13 clubs which competed in the division last season, along with five new clubs:

- Bishop's Cleeve, joined from the Gloucestershire Northern Senior League
- Kintbury Rangers, joined from the North Berks League
- Lambourn Sports, relegated from the Premier Division
- Shortwood United, relegated from the Premier Division
- Yate Town, joined from the Gloucestershire County League

=== League table ===
Pos	Team	Pld	W	D	L	GF	GA	GD	Pts	Promotion or relegation
1	Morris Motors	34	23	8	3	71	30	+41	77	Promoted to the Premier Division
2	Shortwood United	34	21	5	8	74	39	+35	68	Promoted to the Premier Division
3	Yate Town	34	18	11	5	90	53	+37	65	
4	Bishop's Cleeve	34	19	6	9	59	43	+16	63	
5	Pegasus Juniors	34	19	5	10	71	40	+31	62	
6	Milton Keynes Borough	34	18	7	9	69	47	+22	61	Transferred to the South Midlands League
7	Pressed Steel	34	16	6	12	82	44	+38	54	
8	Viking Sports	34	15	9	10	61	43	+18	54	
9	Kintbury Rangers	34	14	10	10	66	56	+10	52	
10	Easington Sports	34	15	7	12	59	68	−9	52	
11	Kidlington	34	12	8	14	64	58	+6	44	
12	Cirencester Town	34	11	8	15	42	50	−8	41	
13	AFC Aldermaston	34	9	8	17	49	63	−14	35	
14	Worrall Hill	34	9	6	19	64	79	−15	33	
15	Lambourn Sports	34	8	7	19	47	85	−38	31	
16	Badminton Picksons	34	7	7	20	48	85	−37	28	
17	Lydney Town	34	4	8	22	39	75	−36	20	Resigned to the Gloucestershire Northern Senior League
18	Dowty Staverton	34	4	2	28	24	121	−97	14	

Source: fchd
Rules for classification: 1) points; 2) goal difference; 3) number of goals scored.
