= 1984–85 Hellenic Football League =

The 1984–85 Hellenic Football League season was the 32nd in the history of the Hellenic Football League, a football competition in England.

== Premier Division ==
Hellenic Football League Premier Division
- Season: 1984–85
- Champions: Shortwood United
- Relegated: Didcot Town; Clanfield
- Matches: 306
- Goals: 893 (2.92 per match)

The Premier Division featured 14 clubs which competed in the division last season, along with four new clubs:

- Hounslow, relegated from the Southern Football League
- Morris Motors, promoted from Division One
- Sharpness, joined from the Gloucestershire County League
- Shortwood United, promoted from Division One

=== League table ===
Pos	Team	Pld	W	D	L	GF	GA	GD	Pts	Promotion or relegation
1	Shortwood United	34	22	10	2	73	30	+43	76	
2	Moreton Town	34	19	6	9	64	32	+32	63	
3	Supermarine	34	17	10	7	57	33	+24	61	
4	Sharpness	34	15	10	9	85	54	+31	55	
5	Hounslow	34	14	12	8	59	37	+22	54	
6	Abingdon United	34	15	8	11	59	37	+22	53	
7	Wantage Town	34	15	6	13	45	42	+3	51	
8	Fairford Town	34	13	11	10	47	43	+4	50	
9	Morris Motors	34	15	4	15	36	45	−9	49	
10	Almondsbury Greenway	34	11	14	9	32	37	−5	47	
11	Abingdon Town	34	12	10	12	43	44	−1	46	
12	Rayners Lane	34	11	10	13	47	44	+3	43	
13	Maidenhead Town	34	10	10	14	50	65	−15	40	
14	Bicester Town	34	9	12	13	42	46	−4	39	
15	Wallingford Town	34	7	12	15	36	48	−12	33	
16	Thame United	34	6	14	14	51	62	−11	32	
17	Didcot Town	34	5	12	17	33	66	−33	27	Relegated to Division One
18	Clanfield	34	3	3	28	34	128	−94	12	Relegated to Division One

Source: fchd
Rules for classification: 1) points; 2) goal difference; 3) number of goals scored.

== Division One ==
Hellenic Football League Division One
- Season: 1984–85
- Champions: Pegasus Juniors
- Promoted: Pegasus Juniors; Yate Town
- Matches: 272
- Goals: 949 (3.49 per match)

Division One featured 14 clubs which competed in the division last season, along with three new clubs:

- Avon Bradford, relegated from the Premier Division
- Hazells, relegated from the Premier Division
- Highworth Town, joined from the Wiltshire League

=== League table ===
Pos	Team	Pld	W	D	L	GF	GA	GD	Pts	Promotion or relegation
1	Pegasus Juniors	32	23	7	2	89	31	+58	76	Promoted to the Premier Division
2	Yate Town	32	19	10	3	80	33	+47	67	Promoted to the Premier Division
3	Pressed Steel	32	18	11	3	77	34	+43	64 (Note: Pressed Steel were deducted one point.)	
4	Bishop's Cleeve	32	19	6	7	66	35	+31	63	
5	Lambourn Sports	32	17	8	7	73	47	+26	59	
6	Cirencester Town	32	14	7	11	53	49	+4	49	
7	Highworth Town	32	12	7	13	54	47	+7	43	
8	Kidlington	32	12	7	13	51	45	+6	43	
9	Avon Bradford	32	13	4	15	53	57	−4	43	
10	Hazells	32	11	9	12	49	50	−1	42	
11	Kintbury Rangers	32	9	11	12	41	55	−14	38	
12	Badminton Picksons	32	10	7	15	62	70	−8	37	
13	AFC Aldermaston	32	10	5	17	47	72	−25	35	
14	Viking Sports	32	8	10	14	39	54	−15	34	
15	Easington Sports	32	7	5	20	44	68	−24	26	
16	Worrall Hill	32	7	2	23	37	83	−46	23	Resigned from the league
17	Dowty Staverton	32	2	6	24	34	119	−85	12	Resigned from the league

Source: fchd
Rules for classification: 1) points; 2) goal difference; 3) number of goals scored.
