= 1979–80 Hellenic Football League =

The 1979–80 Hellenic Football League season was the 27th in the history of the Hellenic Football League, a football competition in England.

== Premier Division ==
Hellenic Football League Premier Division
- Season: 1979–80
- Champions: Bicester Town
- Relegated: Clanfield; Worrall Hill
- Matches: 240
- Goals: 773 (3.22 per match)

The Premier Division featured twelve clubs which competed in the division last season, along with four new clubs.

- Clubs promoted from Division One:
  - Kidlington
  - Morris Motors
  - Northwood
- Plus:
  - Worrall Hill, joined from the Gloucestershire County League

=== League table ===
| Pos | Team | Pld | W | D | L | GF | GA | GR | Pts | Promotion or relegation |
|---|---|---|---|---|---|---|---|---|---|---|
| 1 | Bicester Town | 30 | 19 | 8 | 3 | 57 | 25 | 2.280 | 46 | |
| 2 | Fairford Town | 30 | 17 | 9 | 4 | 64 | 35 | 1.829 | 43 | |
| 3 | Moreton Town | 30 | 13 | 10 | 7 | 54 | 41 | 1.317 | 36 | |
| 4 | Flackwell Heath | 30 | 14 | 7 | 9 | 43 | 33 | 1.303 | 35 | |
| 5 | Abingdon Town | 30 | 14 | 5 | 11 | 49 | 41 | 1.195 | 33 | |
| 6 | Forest Green Rovers | 30 | 11 | 10 | 9 | 56 | 45 | 1.244 | 32 | |
| 7 | Northwood | 30 | 14 | 4 | 12 | 55 | 54 | 1.019 | 32 | |
| 8 | Newbury Town | 30 | 12 | 7 | 11 | 59 | 47 | 1.255 | 31 | |
| 9 | Didcot Town | 30 | 12 | 5 | 13 | 48 | 41 | 1.171 | 29 | |
| 10 | Morris Motors | 30 | 11 | 7 | 12 | 53 | 59 | 0.898 | 29 | |
| 11 | Kidlington | 30 | 11 | 7 | 12 | 36 | 40 | 0.900 | 29 | |
| 12 | Abingdon United | 30 | 11 | 6 | 13 | 38 | 43 | 0.884 | 28 | |
| 13 | Thame United | 30 | 9 | 10 | 11 | 42 | 48 | 0.875 | 28 | |
| 14 | Wallingford Town | 30 | 9 | 3 | 18 | 36 | 55 | 0.655 | 21 | |
| 15 | Clanfield | 30 | 5 | 5 | 20 | 43 | 82 | 0.524 | 15 | Relegated to Division One |
| 16 | Worrall Hill | 30 | 3 | 7 | 20 | 40 | 84 | 0.476 | 13 | Relegated to Division One |

Source: rsssf
Rules for classification: 1) points; 2) goal ratio; 3) number of goals scored.

== Division One ==
Hellenic Football League Division One
- Season: 1979–80
- Champions: Hazells
- Promoted: Hazells; Maidenhead Town

The Division One featured 14 clubs which competed in the division last season, along with 2 new clubs:

- Milton Keynes Borough, transferred from the United Counties League
- A.F.C. Aldermaston, joined from the Reading & District League

=== League table ===
| Pos | Team | Pld | W | D | L | GF | GA | GR | Pts | Promotion or relegation |
|---|---|---|---|---|---|---|---|---|---|---|
| 1 | Hazells | 30 | 24 | 3 | 3 | 79 | 28 | 2.821 | 51 | Promoted to the Premier Division |
| 2 | Maidenhead Town | 30 | 23 | 2 | 5 | 95 | 28 | 3.393 | 48 | Promoted to the Premier Division |
| 3 | Lambourn Sports | 30 | 21 | 6 | 3 | 91 | 45 | 2.022 | 48 | |
| 4 | Milton Keynes Borough | 30 | 18 | 6 | 6 | 72 | 38 | 1.895 | 42 | |
| 5 | Brackley Town | 30 | 19 | 1 | 10 | 61 | 44 | 1.386 | 39 | |
| 6 | Cirencester Town | 30 | 14 | 5 | 11 | 57 | 49 | 1.163 | 33 | |
| 7 | A.F.C. Aldermaston | 30 | 15 | 3 | 12 | 58 | 52 | 1.115 | 33 | |
| 8 | Wantage Town | 30 | 13 | 6 | 11 | 60 | 46 | 1.304 | 32 | |
| 9 | Thatcham Town | 30 | 12 | 6 | 12 | 49 | 55 | 0.891 | 30 | |
| 10 | Pressed Steel | 30 | 9 | 7 | 14 | 37 | 52 | 0.712 | 25 | |
| 11 | Rayners Lane | 30 | 8 | 5 | 17 | 48 | 56 | 0.857 | 21 | |
| 12 | Easington Sports | 30 | 7 | 7 | 16 | 41 | 72 | 0.569 | 21 | |
| 13 | Dowty Staverton | 30 | 6 | 4 | 20 | 26 | 78 | 0.333 | 16 | |
| 14 | Rivet Sports | 30 | 5 | 5 | 20 | 33 | 69 | 0.478 | 15 | |
| 15 | Ruislip Town | 30 | 4 | 7 | 19 | 34 | 79 | 0.430 | 15 | Resigned from the league |
| 16 | Aston Clinton | 30 | 2 | 7 | 21 | 26 | 76 | 0.342 | 11 | Resigned from the league |

Source: nonleaguematters
Rules for classification: 1) points; 2) goal ratio; 3) number of goals scored.
