= 1960–61 Hellenic Football League =

The 1960–61 Hellenic Football League season was the eighth in the history of the Hellenic Football League, a football competition in England.

== Premier Division ==
Hellenic Football League Premier Division
- Season: 1960–61
- Champions: Bicester Town
- Matches: 240
- Goals: 1,224 (5.1 per match)

The Premier Division featured 15 clubs which competed in the division last season, along with one new club:

- Hazells, promoted from Division One

Also, Headington 'A' changed name to Oxford United 'A'.

=== League table ===
Pos	Team	Pld	W	D	L	GF	GA	GR	Pts	Promotion or relegation
1	Bicester Town	30	24	4	2	112	43	2.605	52	
2	Thame United	30	20	7	3	98	46	2.130	47	
3	Hazells	30	22	2	6	129	50	2.580	46	
4	Oxford United 'A'	30	16	3	11	89	69	1.290	35	
5	Hungerford Town	30	15	5	10	86	68	1.265	35	
6	Swindon Town 'A'	30	14	5	11	71	59	1.203	33	
7	Witney Town	30	12	9	9	77	72	1.069	33	
8	Wallingford Town	30	13	5	12	94	83	1.133	31	
9	Abingdon Town	30	13	5	12	61	60	1.017	31	
10	Wantage Town	30	12	5	13	86	69	1.246	29	
11	Thatcham	30	9	5	16	63	91	0.692	23	
12	Newbury Town reserves	30	8	5	17	53	86	0.616	21	
13	Pressed Steel	30	6	7	17	54	84	0.643	19	
14	Kidlington	30	7	3	20	51	100	0.510	17	
15	Stokenchurch	30	6	3	21	46	116	0.397	15	
16	Amersham Town	30	5	3	22	54	128	0.422	13	Transferred to the London League

Source: nonleaguematters
Rules for classification: 1) points; 2) goal ratio; 3) number of goals scored.

== Division One ==
Hellenic Football League Division One
- Season: 1960–61
- Champions: Chipping Norton Town
- Promoted: Chipping Norton Town
- Matches: 182
- Goals: 991 (5.45 per match)

The Division One featured 9 clubs which competed in the division last season, along with 5 new clubs:

- Chipping Norton Town, relegated from the Premier Division
- Camberley United
- Marston United
- Didcot Town Reserves
- A G R G Harwell

=== League table ===
Pos	Team	Pld	W	D	L	GF	GA	GR	Pts	Promotion or relegation
1	Chipping Norton Town	26	19	3	4	108	37	2.919	41	Promoted to the Premier Division
2	Camberley United	26	17	5	4	87	43	2.023	39	Resigned from the league
3	Abingdon United	26	16	2	8	91	52	1.750	34	
4	Stanwell District	26	13	6	7	67	58	1.155	32	
5	Botley United	26	14	2	10	62	45	1.378	30	
6	Princes Risborough Town	26	13	2	11	95	83	1.145	28	
7	Marston United	26	11	5	10	84	79	1.063	27	
8	Hanwell Corinthians	26	10	5	11	68	69	0.986	25	Resigned from the league
9	Didcot Town Reserves	26	12	1	13	56	67	0.836	25	
10	R A F Halton	26	10	3	13	76	71	1.070	23	
11	17th Battalion R A O C	26	8	4	14	63	96	0.656	20	Resigned from the league
12	Henley Town	26	7	5	14	54	76	0.711	19	
13	Ruislip Town	26	4	3	19	34	107	0.318	11	Resigned from the league
14	A G R G Harwell	26	5	0	21	46	108	0.426	10	

Source: nonleaguematters
Rules for classification: 1) points; 2) goal ratio; 3) number of goals scored.
