= 1962–63 Hellenic Football League =

The 1962–63 Hellenic Football League season was the tenth in the history of the Hellenic Football League, a football competition in England.

== Premier Division ==
Hellenic Football League Premier Division
- Season: 1962–63
- Champions: Yiewsley reserves
- Relegated: Pressed Steel
- Matches: 240
- Goals: 1,108 (4.62 per match)

The Premier Division featured 13 clubs which competed in the division last season, along with three new clubs:

- Botley United, promoted from Division One
- Lambourn Sports, promoted from Division One
- Newbury Town, joined from the Metropolitan League

=== League table ===
Pos	Team	Pld	W	D	L	GF	GA	GR	Pts	Promotion or relegation
1	Yiewsley reserves	30	23	4	3	96	29	3.310	50	
2	Thame United	30	22	4	4	111	45	2.467	48	
3	Bicester Town	30	19	3	8	91	53	1.717	41	
4	Chipping Norton Town	30	17	5	8	74	62	1.194	39	
5	Wallingford Town	30	15	6	9	82	53	1.547	36	
6	Newbury Town	30	16	2	12	86	50	1.720	34	
7	Witney Town	30	13	7	10	71	54	1.315	33	
8	Hazells	30	14	5	11	70	57	1.228	33	
9	Abingdon Town	30	13	6	11	64	58	1.103	32	
10	Lambourn Sports	30	12	5	13	77	88	0.875	29	
11	Wantage Town	30	13	3	14	57	76	0.750	29	
12	Oxford United 'A'	30	9	3	18	53	79	0.671	21	
13	Hungerford Town	30	7	4	19	46	95	0.484	18	
14	Stokenchurch	30	6	3	21	56	107	0.523	15	
15	Pressed Steel	30	4	5	21	32	87	0.368	13	Relegated to Division One
16	Botley United	30	4	1	25	42	115	0.365	9	Resigned from the league

Source: nonleaguematters
Rules for classification: 1) points; 2) goal ratio; 3) number of goals scored.

== Division One ==
Hellenic Football League Division One
- Season: 1962–63
- Champions: Amersham Town
- Promoted: Amersham Town; Morris Motors
- Matches: 182
- Goals: 870 (4.78 per match)

The Division One featured 9 clubs which competed in the division last season, along with 5 new clubs:

- Newbury Town reserves, relegated from the Premier Division
- Kidlington, relegated from the Premier Division
- Thatcham, relegated from the Premier Division
- Amersham Town, joined from the London League
- Morris Motors

=== League table ===
Pos	Team	Pld	W	D	L	GF	GA	GR	Pts	Promotion or relegation
1	Amersham Town	26	25	0	1	149	25	5.960	50	Promoted to the Premier Division
2	Morris Motors	26	21	2	3	86	22	3.909	44	Promoted to the Premier Division
3	Thatcham	26	21	2	3	87	32	2.719	44	
4	Henley Town	26	14	5	7	78	51	1.529	33	
5	Marston United	26	13	3	10	49	56	0.875	29	
6	Kidlington	26	11	4	11	56	58	0.966	26	
7	Newbury Town reserves	26	10	6	10	48	51	0.941	26	Resigned from the league
8	Princes Risborough Town	26	7	6	13	41	61	0.672	20	
9	Faringdon Town	26	8	3	15	54	78	0.692	19	
10	Abingdon United	26	6	7	13	49	73	0.671	19	
11	A G R G Harwell	26	8	2	16	48	62	0.774	18	
12	R A F Halton	26	7	1	18	63	101	0.624	15	
13	East Hendred	26	5	4	17	31	88	0.352	14	Resigned from the league
14	Didcot Town reserves	26	2	3	21	31	112	0.277	7	Resigned from the league

Source: nonleaguematters
Rules for classification: 1) points; 2) goal ratio; 3) number of goals scored.
