= 1998–99 Hellenic Football League =

The 1998–99 Hellenic Football League season was the 46th in the history of the Hellenic Football League, a football competition in England.

== Premier Division ==
Hellenic Football League Premier Division
- Season: 1998–99
- Champions: Burnham
- Promoted: Burnham
- Matches: 342
- Goals: 1,081 (3.16 per match)

The Premier Division featured 18 clubs which competed in the division last season, along with one new club:

- Cirencester Academy, promoted from Division One

Also, Endsleigh changed name to EFC Cheltenham.

=== League table ===
Pos	Team	Pld	W	D	L	GF	GA	GD	Pts	Promotion or relegation
1	Burnham	36	26	6	4	88	31	+57	84	Promoted to the Southern Football League
2	Carterton Town	36	25	6	5	82	34	+48	81	
3	Highworth Town	36	21	6	9	92	47	+45	69	
4	Banbury United	36	20	9	7	73	33	+40	69	
5	North Leigh	36	18	11	7	77	44	+33	65	
6	EFC Cheltenham	36	17	5	14	60	36	+24	56	Resigned from the league
7	Abingdon United	36	17	5	14	61	55	+6	56	
8	Tuffley Rovers	36	16	6	14	63	55	+8	54	
9	Didcot Town	36	16	5	15	58	52	+6	53	
10	Bicester Town	36	15	8	13	58	60	−2	53	
11	Cirencester Academy	36	12	11	13	42	56	−14	47	
12	Hallen	36	10	14	12	45	48	−3	44	
13	Fairford Town	36	10	10	16	42	50	−8	40	
14	Swindon Supermarine	36	10	9	17	41	59	−18	39	
15	Shortwood United	36	9	11	16	37	61	−24	38	
16	Almondsbury Town	36	8	7	21	47	82	−35	31	
17	Wantage Town	36	8	5	23	36	90	−54	29	
18	Kintbury Rangers	36	8	8	20	48	89	−41	26 (Note: Kintbury Rangers were deducted six points.)	Resigned to the North Berks League
19	Harrow Hill	36	4	2	30	31	99	−68	14	

Source: fchd
Rules for classification: 1) points; 2) goal difference; 3) number of goals scored.

== Division One ==
Hellenic Football League Division One
- Season: 1998–99
- Champions: Pegasus Juniors
- Promoted: Pegasus Juniors; Milton United
- Matches: 272
- Goals: 946 (3.48 per match)

Division One featured 15 clubs which competed in the division last season, along with two new clubs:

- Forest Green Rovers reserves
- Worcester College Old Boys

=== League table ===
Pos	Team	Pld	W	D	L	GF	GA	GD	Pts	Promotion or relegation
1	Pegasus Juniors	32	22	7	3	96	47	+49	73	Promoted to the Premier Division
2	Ardley United	32	19	5	8	66	46	+20	62	
3	Forest Green Rovers reserves	32	18	6	8	71	40	+31	60	Resigned from the league
4	Milton United	32	18	6	8	62	45	+17	60	Promoted to the Premier Division
5	Wootton Bassett Town	32	17	7	8	64	43	+21	58	
6	Ross Town	32	15	7	10	57	41	+16	52	
7	Letcombe	32	13	9	10	56	47	+9	48	
8	Cheltenham Saracens	32	13	5	14	56	61	−5	44	
9	Worcester College Old Boys	32	11	5	16	42	59	−17	38	
10	Kidlington	32	10	8	14	51	74	−23	38	
11	Purton	32	9	9	14	41	62	−21	36	
12	Bishop's Cleeve	32	9	7	16	55	66	−11	34	
13	Easington Sports	32	8	8	16	47	56	−9	32	
14	Cirencester United	32	8	7	17	49	55	−6	31	
15	Clanfield	32	9	4	19	40	71	−31	31	
16	Watlington	32	7	9	16	49	69	−20	30	Resigned from the league
17	Headington Amateurs	32	6	11	15	44	64	−20	29	

Source: fchd
Rules for classification: 1) points; 2) goal difference; 3) number of goals scored.
