= 1955–56 Hellenic Football League =

The 1955–56 Hellenic Football League season was the third in the history of the Hellenic Football League, a football competition in England.

== Clubs ==
Hellenic Football League
- Season: 1955–56
- Champions: Headington United 'A'
- Relegated: Thatcham; Princes Risborough Town
- Matches: 306
- Goals: 1,642 (5.37 per match)

The league featured 17 clubs which competed in the last season, along with one new club:

- Dunstable Town reserves

=== League table ===
Pos	Team	Pld	W	D	L	GF	GA	GR	Pts	Promotion or relegation
1	Headington United 'A'	34	27	2	5	128	44	2.909	56	
2	Staines Town	34	25	4	5	110	59	1.864	54	
3	Witney Town	34	22	4	8	126	61	2.066	48	
4	Bicester Town	34	18	6	10	97	76	1.276	42	
5	Dunstable Town reserves	34	19	2	13	121	77	1.571	40	
6	Pressed Steel	34	17	5	12	104	89	1.169	39	
7	Kidlington	34	17	5	12	99	94	1.053	39	
8	Abingdon Town	34	16	4	14	81	85	0.953	36	
9	Didcot Town	34	15	3	16	96	91	1.055	33	
10	Rickmansworth Town	34	14	3	17	92	94	0.979	31	Resigned from the league
11	Amersham Town	34	14	3	17	95	113	0.841	31	
12	Chipping Norton Town	34	12	7	15	70	101	0.693	31	
13	Newbury Town reserves	34	14	2	18	86	97	0.887	30	
14	Buckingham Town	34	13	3	18	74	128	0.578	29	
15	Stokenchurch	34	10	7	17	79	88	0.898	27	
16	Wallingford Town	34	7	4	23	67	104	0.644	18	
17	Thatcham	34	7	4	23	65	115	0.565	18	Relegated to Division One
18	Princes Risborough Town	34	4	2	28	52	126	0.413	10	Relegated to Division One

Source: nonleaguematters
Rules for classification: 1) points; 2) goal ratio; 3) number of goals scored.
