= 1977–78 Hellenic Football League =

The 1977–78 Hellenic Football League season was the 25th in the history of the Hellenic Football League, a football competition in England.

== Premier Division ==
Hellenic Football League Premier Division
- Season: 1977–78
- Champions: Chipping Norton Town
- Relegated: Cirencester Town; Thatcham Town
- Matches: 240
- Goals: 739 (3.08 per match)

The Premier Division featured 13 clubs which competed in the division last season, along with three new clubs, promoted from Division One:

- Abingdon United
- Didcot Town
- Flackwell Heath

=== League table ===
Pos	Team	Pld	W	D	L	GF	GA	GR	Pts	Promotion or relegation
1	Chipping Norton Town	30	20	6	4	73	21	3.476	66	
2	Newbury Town	30	19	8	3	66	29	2.276	65	
3	Hungerford Town	30	17	6	7	80	30	2.667	57	Transferred to the Isthmian League Division Two
4	Moreton Town	30	17	4	9	54	38	1.421	55	
5	Fairford Town	30	13	11	6	42	27	1.556	50	
6	Thame United	30	14	8	8	51	39	1.308	50	
7	Wallingford Town	30	14	6	10	47	41	1.146	48	
8	Pinehurst	30	13	9	8	45	43	1.047	48	Resigned from the league
9	Flackwell Heath	30	13	5	12	54	37	1.459	44	
10	Didcot Town	30	11	6	13	34	43	0.791	39	
11	Abingdon Town	30	7	10	13	28	54	0.519	31	
12	Forest Green Rovers	30	6	12	12	49	59	0.831	30	
13	Clanfield	30	7	6	17	32	56	0.571	27	
14	Abingdon United	30	5	8	17	36	66	0.545	23	
15	Thatcham Town	30	3	7	20	20	73	0.274	16	Relegated to Division One
16	Cirencester Town	30	3	4	23	28	83	0.337	13	Relegated to Division One

Source: rsssf
Rules for classification: 1) points; 2) goal ratio; 3) number of goals scored.

== Division One ==
Hellenic Football League Division One
- Season: 1977–78
- Champions: Bicester Town
- Promoted: Bicester Town; Garrard Athletic

The Division One featured 12 clubs which competed in the division last season, along with 4 new clubs:

- Hazells, relegated from the Premier Division
- Lambourn Sports, joined from the North Berks Football League
- Ruislip Town
- Brackley Town, joined from the North Bucks & District Football League

=== League table ===
Pos	Team	Pld	W	D	L	GF	GA	GR	Pts	Promotion or relegation
1	Bicester Town	30	20	5	5	79	28	2.821	65	Promoted to the Premier Division
2	Garrard Athletic	30	18	6	6	70	32	2.188	60	Promoted to the Premier Division
3	Kidlington	30	17	8	5	52	27	1.926	59	
4	Hazells	30	16	6	8	75	39	1.923	54	
5	Easington Sports	30	16	5	9	66	42	1.571	53	
6	Lambourn Sports	30	15	5	10	68	57	1.193	50	
7	Ruislip Town	30	13	7	10	64	64	1.000	46	
8	Morris Motors	30	12	7	11	53	59	0.898	43	
9	Maidenhead Town	30	11	9	10	49	44	1.114	42	
10	Wantage Town	30	11	6	13	36	42	0.857	39	
11	Rivet Sports	30	11	5	14	37	49	0.755	38	
12	Aston Clinton	30	8	8	14	50	47	1.064	32	
13	Pressed Steel	30	9	2	19	51	89	0.573	29	
14	Dowty Staverton	30	6	9	15	45	65	0.692	27	
15	Brackley Town	30	5	8	17	30	64	0.469	23	
16	Buckingham Athletic	30	2	4	24	27	104	0.260	10	

Source: nonleaguematters
Rules for classification: 1) points; 2) goal ratio; 3) number of goals scored.
