= 1995–96 Hellenic Football League =

The 1995–96 Hellenic Football League season was the 43rd in the history of the Hellenic Football League, a football competition in England.

== Premier Division ==
Hellenic Football League Premier Division
- Season: 1995–96
- Champions: Cirencester Town
- Promoted: Cirencester Town
- Matches: 306
- Goals: 1,006 (3.29 per match)

The Premier Division featured 14 clubs which competed in the division last season, along with four new clubs:

- Burnham, relegated from the Southern Football League
- Didcot Town, promoted from Division One
- Endsleigh, promoted from Division One
- Lambourn Sports, promoted from Division One

=== League table ===
Pos	Team	Pld	W	D	L	GF	GA	GD	Pts	Promotion or relegation
1	Cirencester Town	34	24	8	2	69	24	+45	80	Promoted to the Southern Football League
2	Brackley Town	34	19	12	3	60	32	+28	69	
3	Lambourn Sports	34	21	5	8	71	41	+30	68	
4	Tuffley Rovers	34	20	7	7	78	46	+32	67	
5	Burnham	34	20	4	10	66	37	+29	64	
6	Swindon Supermarine	34	20	3	11	82	33	+49	63	
7	Endsleigh	34	16	7	11	56	41	+15	55	
8	North Leigh	34	15	4	15	66	62	+4	49	
9	Carterton Town	34	13	9	12	57	59	−2	48	
10	Abingdon United	34	13	4	17	49	55	−6	43	
11	Fairford Town	34	10	10	14	49	52	−3	40	
12	Almondsbury Town	34	10	7	17	53	54	−1	37	
13	Shortwood United	34	10	5	19	53	82	−29	35	
14	Kintbury Rangers	34	8	9	17	45	74	−29	33	
15	Banbury United	34	8	6	20	40	66	−26	30	
16	Highworth Town	34	9	3	22	36	80	−44	30	
17	Didcot Town	34	7	7	20	39	88	−49	28	
18	Bicester Town	34	6	4	24	37	80	−43	22	

Source: fchd
Rules for classification: 1) points; 2) goal difference; 3) number of goals scored.

== Division One ==
Hellenic Football League Division One
- Season: 1995–96
- Champions: Purton
- Promoted: Wantage Town
- Matches: 306
- Goals: 1,086 (3.55 per match)

Division One featured 16 clubs which competed in the division last season, along with two new clubs:

- Harrow Hill, joined from the Gloucestershire County League
- Pegasus Juniors, demoted from the Premier Division

=== League table ===
Pos	Team	Pld	W	D	L	GF	GA	GD	Pts	Promotion or relegation
1	Purton	34	22	6	6	79	40	+39	72	
2	Wantage Town	34	21	8	5	66	34	+32	71	Promoted to the Premier Division
3	Milton United	34	18	8	8	102	63	+39	62	
4	Hallen	34	16	9	9	75	49	+26	57	
5	Harrow Hill	34	16	9	9	57	38	+19	57	
6	Pegasus Juniors	34	15	7	12	76	62	+14	52	
7	Kidlington	34	13	9	12	73	59	+14	48	
8	Cheltenham Saracens	34	14	6	14	71	71	0	48	
9	Ardley United	34	13	6	15	47	60	−13	45	
10	Wootton Bassett Town	34	12	9	13	50	64	−14	45	
11	Clanfield	34	9	12	13	54	61	−7	39	
12	Bishop's Cleeve	34	10	9	15	50	65	−15	39	
13	Rayners Lane	34	9	11	14	51	66	−15	38	Resigned to the Middlesex League
14	Easington Sports	34	9	10	15	45	64	−19	37	
15	Headington Amateurs	34	10	5	19	51	72	−21	35	
16	Letcombe	34	9	8	17	38	65	−27	35	
17	Yarnton	34	9	6	19	45	84	−39	33	
18	Cirencester United	34	8	8	18	53	66	−13	32	

Source: fchd
Rules for classification: 1) points; 2) goal difference; 3) number of goals scored.
