= 1961–62 Hellenic Football League =

The 1961–62 Hellenic Football League season was the ninth in the history of the Hellenic Football League, a football competition in England.

== Premier Division ==
Hellenic Football League Premier Division
- Season: 1961–62
- Champions: Thame United
- Relegated: Newbury Town reserves Kidlington; Thatcham
- Matches: 272
- Goals: 1,360 (5 per match)

The Premier Division featured 15 clubs which competed in the division last season, along with two new clubs:

- Chipping Norton Town, promoted from Division One
- Yiewsley reserves

=== League table ===
Pos	Team	Pld	W	D	L	GF	GA	GR	Pts	Promotion or relegation
1	Thame United	32	25	2	5	156	56	2.786	52	
2	Yiewsley reserves	32	20	7	5	100	37	2.703	47	
3	Hazells	32	22	3	7	127	65	1.954	47	
4	Swindon Town 'A'	32	20	5	7	101	52	1.942	45	Resigned from the league
5	Bicester Town	32	19	5	8	99	62	1.597	43	
6	Abingdon Town	32	16	7	9	78	53	1.472	39	
7	Oxford United 'A'	32	17	5	10	75	60	1.250	39	
8	Witney Town	32	17	3	12	86	59	1.458	37	
9	Wantage Town	32	12	1	19	66	117	0.564	25	
10	Pressed Steel	32	9	6	17	64	90	0.711	24	
11	Chipping Norton Town	32	10	4	18	64	114	0.561	24	
12	Stokenchurch	32	8	7	17	44	76	0.579	23	
13	Hungerford Town	32	8	6	18	60	82	0.732	22	
14	Newbury Town reserves	32	9	4	19	74	102	0.725	22	Relegated to Division One
15	Wallingford Town	32	8	4	20	61	101	0.604	20	
16	Kidlington	32	8	2	22	54	126	0.429	18	Relegated to Division One
17	Thatcham	32	6	5	21	51	108	0.472	17	Relegated to Division One

Source: nonleaguematters
Rules for classification: 1) points; 2) goal ratio; 3) number of goals scored.

== Division One ==
Hellenic Football League Division One
- Season: 1961–62
- Champions: Botley United
- Promoted: Botley United; Lambourn Sports
- Matches: 132
- Goals: 663 (5.02 per match)

The Division One featured 9 clubs which competed in the division last season, along with 3 new clubs:

- Lambourn Sports
- East Hendred
- Faringdon Town

=== League table ===
Pos	Team	Pld	W	D	L	GF	GA	GR	Pts	Promotion or relegation
1	Botley United	22	19	1	2	85	24	3.542	39	Promoted to the Premier Division
2	Lambourn Sports	22	16	4	2	92	38	2.421	36	Promoted to the Premier Division
3	Henley Town	22	12	4	6	66	45	1.467	28	
4	Marston United	22	12	4	6	53	38	1.395	28	
5	R A F Halton	22	9	5	8	66	65	1.015	23	
6	East Hendred	22	9	3	10	47	50	0.940	21	
7	Abingdon United	22	9	3	10	49	65	0.754	21	
8	Didcot Town Reserves	22	6	4	12	35	64	0.547	16	
9	Faringdon Town	22	7	1	14	51	61	0.836	15	
10	Princes Risborough Town	22	6	2	14	35	55	0.636	14	
11	Stanwell District	22	6	1	15	46	80	0.575	13	Resigned from the league
12	A G R G Harwell	22	3	4	15	38	78	0.487	10	

Source: nonleaguematters
Rules for classification: 1) points; 2) goal ratio; 3) number of goals scored.
