= 1963–64 Hellenic Football League =

The 1963–64 Hellenic Football League season was the 11th in the history of the Hellenic Football League, a football competition in England.

== Premier Division ==
Hellenic Football League Premier Division
- Season: 1963–64
- Champions: Amersham Town
- Relegated: Stokenchurch; Wantage Town
- Matches: 306
- Goals: 1,563 (5.11 per match)

The Premier Division featured 14 clubs which competed in the division last season, along with four new clubs:

- Amersham Town, promoted from Division One
- Didcot Town, joined from the Metropolitan League
- Morris Motors, promoted from Division One
- Swindon Town 'A'

=== League table ===
Pos	Team	Pld	W	D	L	GF	GA	GR	Pts	Promotion or relegation
1	Amersham Town	34	23	6	5	105	45	2.333	52	
2	Yiewsley reserves	34	22	4	8	106	56	1.893	48	
3	Witney Town	34	22	3	9	124	59	2.102	47	
4	Hazells	34	21	5	8	100	58	1.724	47	
5	Didcot Town	34	20	3	11	88	59	1.492	43	
6	Morris Motors	34	19	4	11	102	73	1.397	42	
7	Swindon Town 'A'	34	19	2	13	111	88	1.261	40	
8	Bicester Town	34	18	3	13	101	95	1.063	39	
9	Thame United	34	18	1	15	112	78	1.436	37	
10	Wallingford Town	34	14	8	12	84	74	1.135	36	
11	Abingdon Town	34	12	8	14	77	72	1.069	32	
12	Chipping Norton Town	34	12	4	18	76	87	0.874	28	
13	Lambourn Sports	34	12	2	20	80	112	0.714	26	
14	Newbury Town	34	12	2	20	66	93	0.710	26	
15	Oxford United 'A'	34	12	2	20	76	111	0.685	26	
16	Hungerford Town	34	7	3	24	53	111	0.477	17	
17	Stokenchurch	34	7	0	27	52	150	0.347	14	Relegated to Division One
18	Wantage Town	34	6	0	28	50	142	0.352	12	Relegated to Division One

Source: nonleaguematters
Rules for classification: 1) points; 2) goal ratio; 3) number of goals scored.

== Division One ==
Hellenic Football League Division One
- Season: 1963–64
- Champions: Henley Town
- Promoted: Henley Town; Kidlington
- Matches: 90
- Goals: 465 (5.17 per match)

The Division One featured 9 clubs which competed in the division last season, along with 1 new club:

- Pressed Steel, relegated from the Premier Division

=== League table ===
Pos	Team	Pld	W	D	L	GF	GA	GR	Pts	Promotion or relegation
1	Henley Town	18	13	4	1	59	28	2.107	30	Promoted to the Premier Division
2	Kidlington	18	13	3	2	67	38	1.763	29	Promoted to the Premier Division
3	Thatcham	18	10	4	4	44	32	1.375	24	
4	Princes Risborough Town	18	6	4	8	44	41	1.073	16	
5	Pressed Steel	18	6	4	8	34	32	1.063	16	
6	Abingdon United	18	6	4	8	44	48	0.917	16	
7	A G R G Harwell	18	6	3	9	38	45	0.844	15	
8	R A F Halton	18	6	1	11	50	82	0.610	13	Resigned from the league
9	Marston United	18	4	3	11	44	58	0.759	11	
10	Faringdon Town	18	4	2	12	41	61	0.672	10	

Source: nonleaguematters
Rules for classification: 1) points; 2) goal ratio; 3) number of goals scored.
