= 1953–54 Hellenic Football League =

The 1953–54 Hellenic Football League season was the first in the history of the Hellenic Football League, a football competition in England.

== Clubs ==
Hellenic Football League
- Season: 1953–54
- Champions: Didcot Town
- Matches: 240
- Goals: 1,216 (5.07 per match)

=== League table ===
Pos	Team	Pld	W	D	L	GF	GA	GR	Pts
1	Didcot Town	30	22	4	4	107	44	2.432	48
2	Witney Town	30	21	0	9	123	56	2.196	42
3	Pressed Steel	30	18	6	6	89	47	1.894	42
4	Wallingford Town	30	20	1	9	91	64	1.422	41
5	Chipping Norton Town	30	17	6	7	97	49	1.980	40
6	Headington United 'A'	30	16	5	9	81	69	1.174	37
7	Buckingham Town	30	15	6	9	94	75	1.253	36
8	Amersham Town	30	12	5	13	68	69	0.986	29
9	Staines Town	30	13	3	14	60	67	0.896	29
10	Newbury Town Reserves	30	10	5	15	64	92	0.696	25
11	Abingdon Town	30	10	4	16	73	96	0.760	24
12	Leighton United	30	10	4	16	57	78	0.731	24
13	Bicester Town	30	10	3	17	72	77	0.935	23
14	Stokenchurch	30	10	2	18	62	94	0.660	22
15	Thatcham	30	7	4	19	45	79	0.570	18
16	Princes Risborough Town	30	0	0	30	33	160	0.206	0

Source: nonleaguematters
Rules for classification: 1) points; 2) goal ratio; 3) number of goals scored.
