= 1956–57 Hellenic Football League =

The 1956–57 Hellenic Football League season was the fourth in the history of the Hellenic Football League, a football competition in England. It also was the first season for the league to consist of two divisions after ten new clubs joined the league.

== Premier Division ==
Hellenic Football League Premier Division
- Season: 1956–57
- Champions: Abingdon Town
- Matches: 272
- Goals: 1,389 (5.11 per match)

The Premier Division featured 15 clubs which competed in the division last season, along with two new clubs:

- Bletchley & Wipac
- Wantage Town, joined from the Swindon & District League

=== League table ===
Pos	Team	Pld	W	D	L	GF	GA	GR	Pts	Promotion or relegation
1	Abingdon Town	32	22	6	4	90	42	2.143	50	
2	Stokenchurch	32	23	3	6	114	45	2.533	49	
3	Dunstable Town reserves	32	20	4	8	106	53	2.000	44	
4	Witney Town	32	19	5	8	106	58	1.828	43	
5	Staines Town	32	20	3	9	102	64	1.594	43	
6	Didcot Town	32	19	5	8	88	53	1.660	43	Transferred to the Metropolitan League
7	Bicester Town	32	17	5	10	88	76	1.158	39	
8	Wantage Town	32	17	3	12	78	70	1.114	37	
9	Newbury Town reserves	32	10	6	16	99	89	1.112	26	
10	Chipping Norton Town	32	11	4	17	87	104	0.837	26	
11	Headington United 'A'	32	11	4	17	70	85	0.824	26	
12	Kidlington	32	9	6	17	80	107	0.748	24	
13	Buckingham Town	32	10	2	20	74	119	0.622	22	Resigned from the league
14	Bletchley & Wipac	32	10	2	20	45	84	0.536	22	
15	Pressed Steel	32	8	4	20	45	93	0.484	20	
16	Wallingford Town	32	6	4	22	44	102	0.431	16	
17	Amersham Town	32	5	4	23	73	145	0.503	14	

Source: nonleaguematters
Rules for classification: 1) points; 2) goal ratio; 3) number of goals scored.

== Division One ==
Hellenic Football League Division One
- Season: 1956–57
- Champions: Luton Town Colts
- Promoted: Luton Town Colts
- Matches: 90
- Goals: 470 (5.22 per match)

The Division One featured 10 new clubs:

- Amersham Town Reserves
- Aylesbury Town Corinthians
- Bletchley & Wipac Reserves
- Luton Town Colts
- Princes Risborough Town, relegated from the Hellenic League (single division)
- R A F Halton
- Ruislip Town
- Staines Town Reserves
- Stokenchurch Reserves
- Thatcham, relegated from the Hellenic League (single division)

=== League table ===
Pos	Team	Pld	W	D	L	GF	GA	GR	Pts	Promotion or relegation
1	Luton Town Colts	18	16	1	1	103	15	6.867	33	Promoted to the Premier Division
2	Aylesbury Town Corinthians	18	14	2	2	68	18	3.778	30	
3	Ruislip Town	18	10	4	4	48	27	1.778	24	
4	Princes Risborough Town	18	9	4	5	41	38	1.079	22	
5	R A F Halton	18	9	3	6	69	48	1.438	21	
6	Stokenchurch Reserves	18	6	6	6	39	50	0.780	18	
7	Thatcham	18	5	5	8	32	44	0.727	15	
8	Staines Town Reserves	18	3	2	13	22	52	0.423	8	
9	Amersham Town Reserves	18	2	1	15	30	107	0.280	5	
10	Bletchley & Wipac Reserves	18	1	2	15	18	71	0.254	4	Resigned from the league

Source: nonleaguematters
Rules for classification: 1) points; 2) goal ratio; 3) number of goals scored.
