= ATFC =

ATFC can refer to:

== Association football clubs ==
- Aberdare Town F.C.
- Abergavenny Thursdays F.C.
- Aberystwyth Town F.C.
- Abingdon Town F.C.
- Aldershot Town F.C.
- Alfreton Town F.C.
- Almondsbury Town F.C.
- Alnwick Town F.C.
- Alresford Town F.C.
- Alsager Town F.C.
- Alton Town F.C.
- Amersham Town F.C.
- Amesbury Town F.C.
- Amlwch Town F.C.
- Ampthill Town F.C.
- Ardeer Thistle F.C.
- Arlesey Town F.C.
- Arnold Town F.C.
- Ashford Town (Middlesex) F.C.
- Ashford United F.C.
- Atherstone Town F.C.
- Athlone Town F.C.

== See also ==
- ATAFC (disambiguation)
