= 1980–81 Hellenic Football League =

The 1980–81 Hellenic Football League season was the 28th in the history of the Hellenic Football League, a football competition in England.

== Premier Division ==
Hellenic Football League Premier Division
- Season: 1980–81
- Champions: Newbury Town
- Relegated: Morris Motors; Abingdon United
- Matches: 240
- Goals: 748 (3.12 per match)

The Premier Division featured 14 clubs which competed in the division last season, along with two new clubs, promoted from Division One:

- Hazells
- Maidenhead Town

=== League table ===
Pos	Team	Pld	W	D	L	GF	GA	GD	Pts	Promotion or relegation
1	Newbury Town	30	23	4	3	75	27	+48	50	
2	Thame United	30	17	8	5	51	22	+29	42	
3	Hazells	30	16	8	6	53	36	+17	40	
4	Moreton Town	30	15	8	7	72	35	+37	38	
5	Flackwell Heath	30	13	8	9	47	30	+17	34	
6	Abingdon Town	30	13	8	9	48	37	+11	34	
7	Forest Green Rovers	30	14	6	10	57	53	+4	34	
8	Fairford Town	30	15	2	13	47	42	+5	32	
9	Didcot Town	30	9	9	12	36	47	−11	27	
10	Maidenhead Town	30	10	5	15	42	48	−6	25	
11	Bicester Town	30	7	11	12	41	60	−19	25	
12	Northwood	30	6	10	14	37	52	−15	22	
13	Kidlington	30	8	6	16	32	55	−23	22	
14	Wallingford Town	30	8	5	17	43	73	−30	21	
15	Morris Motors	30	7	6	17	36	57	−21	20	Relegated to Division One
16	Abingdon United	30	5	4	21	31	74	−43	14	Relegated to Division One

Source: rsssf
Rules for classification: 1) points; 2) goal difference; 3) number of goals scored.

== Division One ==
Hellenic Football League Division One
- Season: 1981–82
- Champions: Wantage Town
- Promoted: Wantage Town; Clanfield

The Division One featured 12 clubs which competed in the division last season, along with 4 new clubs:

- Clanfield, relegated from the Premier Division
- Worrall Hill, relegated from the Premier Division
- Lydney Town, joined from the Gloucestershire Northern Senior League
- Viking Sports, joined from the Middlesex League

=== League table ===
Pos	Team	Pld	W	D	L	GF	GA	GD	Pts	Promotion or relegation
1	Wantage Town	30	20	4	6	68	31	+37	44	Promoted to the Premier Division
2	Clanfield	30	16	12	2	67	32	+35	44	Promoted to the Premier Division
3	Cirencester Town	30	16	11	3	73	34	+39	43	
4	Pressed Steel	30	17	8	5	66	29	+37	42	
5	Lydney Town	30	16	5	9	60	34	+26	37	
6	Rayners Lane	30	15	5	10	46	36	+10	35	
7	Brackley Town	30	12	10	8	64	43	+21	34	
8	Thatcham Town	30	11	12	7	48	41	+7	34	
9	Milton Keynes Borough	30	14	6	10	52	49	+3	34	
10	Viking Sports	30	9	11	10	46	50	−4	29	
11	Lambourn Sports	30	11	5	14	54	67	−13	27	
12	A.F.C. Aldermaston	30	9	4	17	41	70	−29	22	
13	Worrall Hill	30	7	5	18	36	57	−21	19	
14	Rivet Sports	30	6	7	17	35	72	−37	19	Resigned from the league
15	Dowty Staverton	30	5	4	21	38	66	−28	14	
16	Easington Sports	30	1	1	28	16	99	−83	3	

Source: nonleaguematters
Rules for classification: 1) points; 2) goal ratio; 3) number of goals scored.
