= Abingdon United F.C. =

Association football club in England

Coordinates: 51°40′52.84″N 1°16′28.98″W

Abingdon United
- Full name: Abingdon United Football Club
- Nicknames: Ab U, United
- Founded: 1946
- Ground: The Northcourt, Abingdon-on-Thames
- Capacity: 2,000 (158 seated)
- Chairman: Alan Midwinter
- Manager: Julian McCalmon
- League: Combined Counties League Premier Division North
- 2025–26: Combined Counties League Premier Division North, 12th of 20
Home colours	Away colours

Abingdon United Football Club is a football club based in Abingdon-on-Thames, England. The club are currently members of the Combined Counties League Premier Division North and play at The Northcourt.

== History ==
The club was founded in 1946 by ex-servicemen as a rival to the already existing Abingdon Town at the Anchor pub on the bank of the River Thames. The new club joined Division One of the North Berks League, and won the league's Charity Shield in their first season, beating Wallingford Town 3–2 after extra time in the final. Despite finishing ninth out of twelve clubs in Division One in 1947–48, they were relegated to Division Two.

Abingdon went on to win Division Two in 1952–53, and were promoted back to Division One. In 1958 they moved up to the Hellenic League, where for the next 19 seasons the club remained in the bottom division of the Hellenic League, winning the Division One Cup in 1965–66. After finishing third in 1976–77 they were promoted to the Premier Division. They stayed in the premier division until the 1980–81 season, in which they finished bottom and were relegated back to Division One. However, after a single season in Division One, they made an immediate return, finishing as runners-up. The club then remained in the Hellenic premier Division for another 24 seasons.

In 1982–83 season Abingdon entered the FA Vase for the first time; four seasons later they played in the FA Cup for the first time, losing to Stourbridge after two replays in the first qualifying round. The 1996–97 season saw the club win three trophies; the Hellenic League's Floodlit Cup, the Hellenic – Hungerford Cup and the Berks & Bucks Senior Trophy. They retained the Berks & Bucks Senior Trophy the following season, and won the Hellenic – Hungerford Cup again in 2001–02. In 2005–06 the club finished third in the Premier Division, and were promoted to Division One South & West of the Southern League. The club remained in the Southern League Division One South & West until the end of the 2012–13 season, when they resigned from the league and rejoined the Hellenic League Premier Division.

At the end of the 2015–16 season Abingdon were relegated to Division One East. However, after finishing as runners-up in Division One East the following season, they were promoted back to the Premier Division. The club were relegated back to Division One of the Hellenic League in the 2018–19 season. In 2024–25 they finished fourth in the division, qualifying for the promotion play-offs. After beating Clanfield on penalties in the semi-finals, the club defeated Wantage Town 2–0 in the final to earn promotion to the Premier Division North of the Combined Counties League.

=== Season-by-season record ===
Season	Division	Position	Significant events
1949–50	North Berks League Division One	3/14	
1949–50	North Berks League Division One	9/12	Relegated
1949–50	North Berks League Division Two	5/12	
1949–50	North Berks League Division Two	7/12	
1950–51	North Berks League Division Two	10/11	
1951–52	North Berks League Division Two	12/14	
1952–53	North Berks League Division Two	1/13	Champions, promoted
1953–54	North Berks League Division One	9/13	
1954–55	North Berks League Division One	8/13	
1955–56	North Berks League Division One	8/13	
1956–57	North Berks League Division One	7/10	
1957–58	North Berks League Division One	7/10	Moved up to Hellenic League
1958–59	Hellenic League Division One	7/13	
1959–60	Hellenic League Division One	9/12	
1960–61	Hellenic League Division One	3/14	
1961–62	Hellenic League Division One	7/12	
1962–63	Hellenic League Division One	10/14	
1963–64	Hellenic League Division One	6/10	
1964–65	Hellenic League Division One	10/16	
1965–66	Hellenic League Division One	4/16	
1966–67	Hellenic League Division One	4/16	
1967–68	Hellenic League Division One	7/16	
1968–69	Hellenic League Division One	5/18	
1969–70	Hellenic League Division One	12/19	
1970–71	Hellenic League Division One	7/20	Division One renamed Division One A
1971–72	Hellenic League Division One A	8/13	League reorganised, placed in Division Two
1972–73	Hellenic League Division Two	9/11	Division Two renamed Division One
1973–74	Hellenic League Division One	19/21	
1974–75	Hellenic League Division One	12/14	
1975–76	Hellenic League Division One	5/14	
1976–77	Hellenic League Division One	3/16	Promoted
1977–78	Hellenic League Premier Division	14/16	
1978–79	Hellenic League Premier Division	14/14	
1979–80	Hellenic League Premier Division	12/16	
1980–81	Hellenic League Premier Division	16/16	Relegated
1981–82	Hellenic League Division One	2/16	Promoted
1982–83	Hellenic League Premier Division	12/16	
1983–84	Hellenic League Premier Division	4/17	
1984–85	Hellenic League Premier Division	6/18	
1985–86	Hellenic League Premier Division	7/18	
1986–87	Hellenic League Premier Division	6/18	
1987–88	Hellenic League Premier Division	4/18	
1988–89	Hellenic League Premier Division	3/17	
1989–90	Hellenic League Premier Division	3/18	
1990–91	Hellenic League Premier Division	7/18	
1991–92	Hellenic League Premier Division	6/18	
1992–93	Hellenic League Premier Division	15/18	
1993–94	Hellenic League Premier Division	12/18	
1994–95	Hellenic League Premier Division	11/16	
1995–96	Hellenic League Premier Division	10/18	
1996–97	Hellenic League Premier Division	2/18	
1997–98	Hellenic League Premier Division	10/18	
1998–99	Hellenic League Premier Division	7/19	
1999–2000	Hellenic League Premier Division	8/19	
2000–01	Hellenic League Premier Division	5/20	
2001–02	Hellenic League Premier Division	4/22	
2002–03	Hellenic League Premier Division	8/21	
2003–04	Hellenic League Premier Division	11/22	
2004–05	Hellenic League Premier Division	5/22	
2005–06	Hellenic League Premier Division	3/21	Promoted
2006–07	Southern League Division One South & West	11/22	
2007–08	Southern League Division One South & West	16/22	
2008–09	Southern League Division One South & West	15/22	
2009–10	Southern League Division One South & West	14/22	
2010–11	Southern League Division One South & West	16/21	
2011–12	Southern League Division One South & West	18/21	
2012–13	Southern League Division One South & West	20/22	Resigned
2013–14	Hellenic League Premier Division	17/20	
2014–15	Hellenic League Premier Division	15/20	
2015–16	Hellenic League Premier Division	19/20	Relegated
2016–17	Hellenic League Division One West	2/16	Promoted
2017–18	Hellenic League Premier Division	13/20	
2018–19	Hellenic League Premier Division	19/19	Relegated
2019–20	Hellenic League Division One East	–	Season abandoned due to the COVID-19 pandemic
2020–21	Hellenic League Division One East	10/15	Season abandoned due to the COVID-19 pandemic
2021–22	Hellenic League Division One	15/17	
2022–23	Hellenic League Division One	7/19	
2023–24	Hellenic League Division One		

== Ground ==
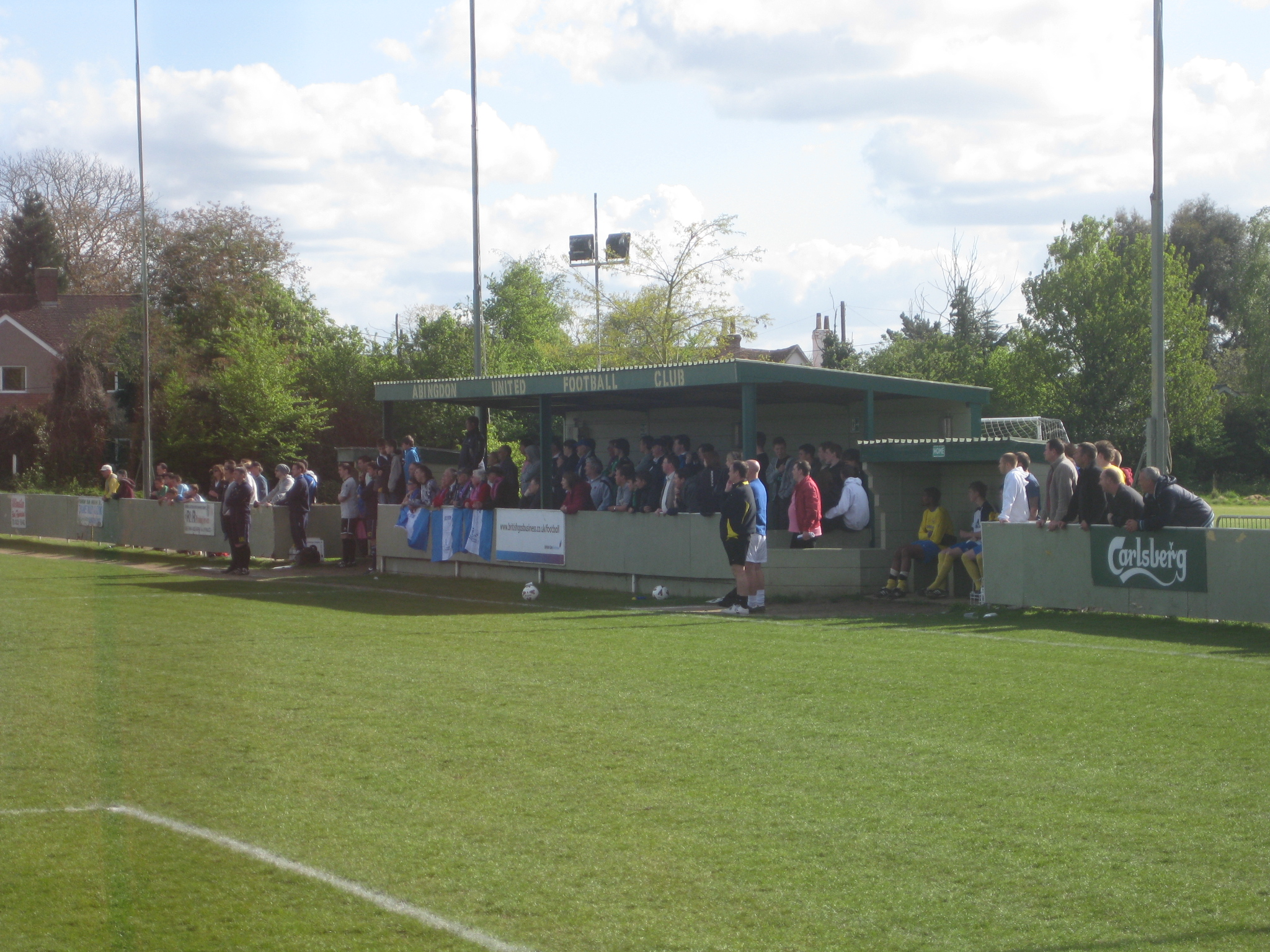
The old stand and dugouts at Northcourt Road

Abingdon United play their home games at the Northcourt Stadium in Northcourt Road, Abingdon. It has a capacity of 2,000, of which 158 is seated and 258 covered. A new sixty-year lease was signed with landlords Vale of White Horse District Council on 25 February 2026, extending Abingdon United's tenancy of the Northcourt Road ground until 2086. The original lease on the ground had been signed in 1973.

== Honours ==
- Hellenic League
  - Division One Cup winners 1965–66
  - Floodlit Cup winners 1996–97
  - Hellenic – Hungerford Cup winners 1996–97, 2001–02
- North Berks League
  - Champions 1952–53
- Berks & Bucks Senior Trophy
  - Winners 1996–97, 1997–98
- North Berks Charity Shield
  - Winners 1946–47

== Records ==
- Highest league position: 11th in Southern League Division One South & West, 2006–07
- Best FA Cup performance: Second qualifying round, 2000–01, 2009–10, 2014–15
- Best FA Trophy performance: Second qualifying round, 2006–07, 2007–08
- Best FA Vase performance: Third round, 1988–89
- Record attendance: 1,621 vs Wantage Town, Hellenic League Division One play-off final, 25 April 2025

== See also ==
- Abingdon United F.C. players
