= Pat Quartermain =

English footballer (1937–2023)

Personal information
- Full name: Patrick George Quartermain
- Date of birth: 16 April 1937
- Place of birth: Garsington, England
- Date of death: 20 December 2023 (aged 86)
- Position: Left back

Senior career*
Years	Team	Apps	(Gls)
1955–1967	Oxford United	305	(0)
1969–1970	Cambridge United	18	(1)

Managerial career
- Clanfield
- * Club domestic league appearances and goals

Patrick George Quartermain (16 April 1937 – 20 December 2023) was an English footballer who played for Oxford United and Cambridge United. During his spell at Oxford, he played 285 league games. Joining Oxford United in 1955 as an amateur, he turned professional in 1962 when the team joined The Football League. He also played for Nuneaton Borough and Banbury United.

After his playing career he managed Clanfield, winning the Hellenic Football League cup in the 1973–74 season.

Quartermain died on 20 December 2023, at the age of 86.
