= ATAFC =

ATAFC may refer to one of the following English association football clubs:

- Almondsbury Town A.F.C.
- Ashton Town A.F.C.
- Alnwick Town A.F.C.

== See also ==
- ATFC (disambiguation)
