= Henry Bowles =

Henry Bowles may refer to:

- Henry L. Bowles (1866–1932), United States Representative from Massachusetts
- Sir Henry Bowles, 1st Baronet (1858–1943), British soldier and politician

== See also ==
- Henry Bowl (1914–1991), English footballer
