= Hereford Pegasus F.C. =

Association football club in England

Hereford Pegasus
- Full name: Hereford Pegasus Football Club
- Nicknames: The Redmen, Peggy
- Founded: 1955
- Ground: Old School Lane; Hereford
- Capacity: 2,000
- Coordinates: 52.0735°N 2.7120°W
- Manager: Jamie Pitman
- League: Hellenic League Premier Division
- 2025–26: Hellenic League Premier Division, 9th of 20
- Website: https://herefordpegasus.co.uk/
Home colours	Away colours

Hereford Pegasus Football Club is a football club based in Hereford, England. The club is affiliated to the Herefordshire County FA. Pegasus Juniors Football Club run a total of 23 teams and provide football for all ages, starting from the age of five. The club's first team plays in the Hellenic League Premier Division, and junior teams play in the Herefordshire Junior Football League, Herefordshire Girls Football League or the Midland Junior Premier League.

== History ==
The club was formed as Pegasus Juniors in 1955 by a group of players from the Herefordshire County Boys team who wished to continue playing together. Their name was inspired by the great amateur team Pegasus.

Originally the club played in the local Herefordshire League, where they accumulated a large number of league titles and cups, until in 1982 they stepped up to the Hellenic League. In 1985 they were Division One champions and promoted to the Premier Division. Eight years later they were relegated but bounced back at the first attempt. In 1995 they were relegated once again due to their ground failing new guidelines, but in 1999 they returned to the Premier Division where they remained until relegated in 2011, where they opted to join the West Midlands (Regional) League Premier Division, rather than drop into the Hellenic League Division One West to minimise travel.

A season of consolidation followed before a much improved seventh-place finish in 2012–13. A change of management ahead of 2013–14 led to a second-place finish.

In the 2009–10 season, they reached the second qualifying round of the FA Cup when they travelled to Football Conference side AFC Telford United having defeated higher graded Willenhall Town and Hednesford Town along the way, however they were unable to progress any further losing 4–1 in front of a crowd of 1,136.

In 2019, the club changed its name to Hereford Pegasus. The club, along with other local clubs, was transferred from the West Midlands (Regional) League Premier Division to Hellenic League Division One as part of a reorganisation at step 5 of the National League System.

Pegasus won promotion to the Hellenic League Premier Division in the 2021–22 season after defeating Worcester Raiders 3–0 in the play-off final. The club finished 8th in the Premier Division the following season.

Prior to the 2023–24 season, the club parted company with joint manager Dave Cadwallader, leaving Mark Hibbard in sole charge. Former Hereford United player and manager Jamie Pitman joined the coaching staff in June 2023. The club also made significant changes to their senior team structure off the pitch, renaming their reserves side to Hereford Pegasus Development.

== Seasons ==
Season	League											FA Cup	FA Vase
Season	Division	Level (Step)	Pld	W	D	L	GF	GA	GD	Pts	Pos	FA Cup	FA Vase
1982–83	Hellenic League Division One	—	30	17	5	8	58	41	+17	39	3rd	—	–
1983–84	Hellenic League Division One	—	34	19	5	10	71	40	+31	62	5th	—	1R
1984–85	Hellenic League Division One	—	32	23	7	2	89	31	+58	76	↑1st	—	PR
1985–86	Hellenic League Premier Division	—	34	13	5	16	56	64	–8	44	11th	—	PR
1986–87	Hellenic League Premier Division	8	34	10	10	14	53	56	–3	40	12th	—	1R
1987–88	Hellenic League Premier Division	8	34	9	3	22	46	61	–15	30	17th	—	PR
1988–89	Hellenic League Premier Division	8	32	15	6	11	60	55	+5	51	5th	—	PR
1989–90	Hellenic League Premier Division	8	34	14	6	14	47	62	–15	48	9th	—	EP
1990–91	Hellenic League Premier Division	8	34	8	7	19	46	68	–22	31	15th	—	PR
1991–92	Hellenic League Premier Division	8	34	11	5	18	66	68	–2	38	13th	—	PR
1992–93	Hellenic League Premier Division	8	34	7	9	18	52	76	–24	30	↓17th	—	1R
1993–94	Hellenic League Division One	9	34	21	6	7	86	44	+42	69	↑2nd	—	EP
1994–95	Hellenic League Premier Division	8	30	11	9	10	49	43	+6	42	↓9th (Note: Demoted due to ground grading failures)	—	EP
1995–96	Hellenic League Division One	9	34	15	7	12	76	62	+14	52	6th	—	1Q
1996–97	Hellenic League Division One	9	32	18	4	10	61	29	+32	58	7th	—	2Q
1997–98	Hellenic League Division One	9	32	14	6	12	62	50	+12	48	7th	—	—
1998–99	Hellenic League Division One	9	32	22	7	3	96	47	+49	73	↑ 1st	—	—
1999–2000	Hellenic League Premier Division	8	36	15	5	16	62	61	+1	50	10th	—	—
2000–01	Hellenic League Premier Division	8	38	12	4	22	67	96	–29	40	15th	—	2R
2001–02	Hellenic League Premier Division	8	42	16	5	21	65	92	–27	53	13th	—	1R
2002–03	Hellenic League Premier Division	8	40	8	7	25	45	108	–63	31	18th	—	1Q
2003–04	Hellenic League Premier Division	8	42	11	5	26	45	105	–60	38	17th	—	1Q
2004–05	Hellenic League Premier Division	9 (Note: Hellenic League Premier Division became level 9 of the English football league system for the 2004–05 season due to the addition of the Conference North and Conference South at level 6) (5)	42	12	8	22	62	95	–33	44	16th	—	2Q
2005–06	Hellenic League Premier Division	9 (5)	40	12	11	17	53	74	–21	47	13th	1Q	2Q
2006–07	Hellenic League Premier Division	9 (5)	38	9	7	22	45	85	–40	34	17th	EP	2Q
2007–08	Hellenic League Premier Division	9 (5)	42	12	12	18	61	78	–17	45 (Note: Deducted three points)	17th	EP	1R
2008–09	Hellenic League Premier Division	9 (5)	42	17	4	21	73	82	–9	55	10th	EP	1Q
2009–10	Hellenic League Premier Division	9 (5)	42	13	11	18	69	78	–9	50	14th	2Q	2Q
2010–11	Hellenic League Premier Division	9 (5)	42	3	4	35	39	156	–117	13	↓22nd	EP	2Q
2011–12	West Midlands (Regional) League Premier Division	10 (6)	42	14	6	22	50	68	–18	48	17th	EP	1Q
2012–13	West Midlands (Regional) League Premier Division	10 (6)	41	21	8	12	93	65	+28	71	7th	PR	1R
2013–14	West Midlands (Regional) League Premier Division	10 (6)	42	32	4	6	127	44	+83	100	2nd	EP	1Q
2014–15	West Midlands (Regional) League Premier Division	10 (6)	42	20	5	17	80	56	+24	65	9th	EP	2R
2015–16	West Midlands (Regional) League Premier Division	10 (6)	42	21	3	18	87	77	+10	66	9th	EP	1Q
2016–17	West Midlands (Regional) League Premier Division	10 (6)	38	17	3	18	85	74	+11	54	9th	—	2Q
2017–18	West Midlands (Regional) League Premier Division	10 (6)	38	7	7	24	37	108	–71	28	19th	—	1Q
2018–19	West Midlands (Regional) League Premier Division	10 (6)	38	4	3	31	26	109	–83	15	20th	—	1Q
2019–20 (Note: Season abandoned due to COVID-19)	Hellenic League Division One West	10 (6)	24	16	4	4	79	39	+40	52	2nd	—	1Q
2020–21	Hellenic League Division One West	10 (6)	10	5	1	4	16	17	–1	16	6th	—	1Q
2021–22	Hellenic League Division One	10 (6)	32	18	6	8	89	46	+43	60	↑4th	—	2Q
2022–23	Hellenic League Premier Division	9 (5)	38	18	5	15	69	68	+1	59	8th	EP	2Q
2023–24	Hellenic League Premier Division	9 (5)	38	16	7	15	77	73	+4	55	9th	EP	1R
2024–25	Hellenic League Premier Division	9 (5)	38	10	9	19	57	69	–12	39	14th	EP	1R
2025-26	Hellenic League Premier Division	9 (5)	38	15	6	17	72	79	–7	51	9th	EP	1R
Source: Football Club History Database (Pegasus Juniors), Football Club History Database (Hereford Pegasus)

Key

Promoted	Relegated

- ↑ = Promoted
- ↓ = Relegated
- EP = Extra preliminary round
- PR = Preliminary round
- 1Q = First qualifying round
- 2Q = Second qualifying round
- 3Q = Third qualifying round
- 4Q = Fourth qualifying round
- 1R = First round proper
- 2R = Second round proper
- 3R = Third round proper
- 4R = Fourth round proper
- 5R = Fifth round proper
- QF = Quarter-finals
- SF = Semi-finals
- RU = Runners-up
- W = Winners

== Ground ==
Hereford Pegasus play at Old School Lane, named the KGD Stadium for sponsorship reasons.

In December 2018, the club were granted permission by the local council to replace the grassed playing surface with 3G artificial turf. Work began in June the following year and was completed ahead of schedule in August, ready for the 2019–20 season.

== Coaching staff ==
Name	Role	Ref.
Mark Hibbard	Manager	
Jamie Pitman	Coach	
Matt Phillips	Coach	
Jamie Price	Player/Coach	
Rory Hollingshead	Goalkeeping Coach	

== Honours ==
- Hellenic Football League Division One
  - Champions (2): 1984–85, 1998–99
  - Runners-up: 1993–94
  - Play-offs: 2021–22
- West Midlands (Regional) League Premier Division
  - Runners-up: 2013–14

== Records ==
- Best league performance: 5th in Hellenic League Premier Division, 1988–89
- Best FA Cup performance: Second qualifying round, 2009–10
- Best FA Vase performance: Second round proper, 2000–01 & 2014–15
