= Jamie Pitman =

English footballer and football manager

Personal information
- Date of birth: 6 January 1976 (age 50)
- Place of birth: Trowbridge, Wiltshire, England
- Position: Midfielder

Team information
- Current team: Hereford Pegasus (manager)

Youth career
- –1994: Swindon Town

Senior career*
Years	Team	Apps	(Gls)
1994–1996	Swindon Town	3	(0)
1996–1998	Hereford United	51	(5)
1998–2000	Yeovil Town	42	(2)
2000–2002	Woking	53	(1)
2002–2006	Hereford United	131	(11)
2006–2008	Forest Green Rovers	64	(1)
Total		344	(20)

Managerial career
- 2010–2012: Hereford United
- 2025–: Hereford Pegasus
- * Club domestic league appearances and goals

Jamie Pitman (born 6 January 1976) is an English football player and coach who was the manager of Hereford United until 5 March 2012.

== Playing career ==
He progressed through the youth system at Swindon Town, eventually making three league appearances before being released. He joined Hereford United in early 1996 when the Bulls started their push for the playoffs. He missed much of the following season through injury, which saw Hereford relegated out of the Football League. He stayed with the club for their first season in the Conference before spending two seasons each at Yeovil Town and Woking. During his spell at the latter, he scored the goal that knocked Hereford out of the FA Cup in 2000.

He rejoined the Bulls for the 2002–03 season when they were undergoing a squad clearout. He scored twice on his return, in a 2–1 win against Farnborough Town and in the next two seasons he missed only a handful of League matches. His final game for the club was the Conference Playoff Final in 2006, where he came on as a substitute for the start of extra time to help Hereford regain their League status. He was the only Hereford player on the pitch who had experienced the club's relegation in 1997 as well as the two playoff disappointments in 2004 and 2005. Although he wished to stay at the club, he was not offered a new contract.

At the start of the 2006–07 season, he signed for Forest Green Rovers. He made a total of 64 appearances in the Conference National scoring just once and was player/assistant manager to Jim Harvey before he departed in August 2008 for Hereford United as their club physiotherapist.

== Management career ==
On 4 October 2010, Pitman was appointed caretaker manager of Hereford United after Simon Davey and his assistant Andy Fensome were sacked, and on 16 December 2010 he was appointed manager until the end of the season. On 21 April 2011 it was confirmed by the club that Pitman had been handed a new two-year contract as manager. On 5 March 2012 he was sacked by Hereford after they had won only once in their last eight games but was retained on the club's coaching staff.

In June 2023, Pitman joined Hereford Pegasus as a Coach.

== Managerial statistics ==
Updated 5 March 2012.

Team	Nat	From	To	Record				
Team	Nat	From	To	G	W	D	L	Win %
Hereford United	(England)	4 October 2010	5 March 2012	80	22	26	32	27.50

== Honours ==
Individual

- Football Conference Goalscorer of the Month: August 2002
