= John Bailey (footballer, born 1950) =

English footballer

Personal information
- Full name: John Stephen Bailey
- Date of birth: 30 July 1950 (age 76)
- Place of birth: England
- Position: Wing half

Team information
- Current team: Didcot Town chairman

Youth career
- 1966–1968: Swindon Town

Senior career*
Years	Team	Apps	(Gls)
1968–1970	Swindon Town	2	(0)
–	Cheltenham Town		
- * Club domestic league appearances and goals

John Stephen Bailey (born 30 July 1950) is an English former professional footballer who played as a wing half in the Football League for Swindon Town and in non-league football for Cheltenham Town. He has been chairman of Didcot Town Football Club since 1995.
