= Harry Bowl =

English footballer

Personal information
- Date of birth: 16 April 1914
- Place of birth: Alvescot, Berkshire
- Date of death: 1991 (aged 77)
- Height: 5 ft 9 in (1.75 m)
- Positions: Centre forward; inside left

Senior career*
Years	Team	Apps	(Gls)
- Clanfield
- Stanford in the Vale
1933–1935	Swindon Town	44	(8)
1936	Blackpool	2	(1)
1937–1939	Exeter City	79	(43)
- Lancaster Town
1955	Clanfield		
- * Club domestic league appearances and goals

Henry Thomas Bowl (16 April 1914 – 20 April 1991) was an English professional footballer. He played for Swindon Town, Blackpool and Exeter City.

== Career ==
Bowl began his career with Clanfield, and then moved to Stanford in the Vale, where he was quickly signed up by Swindon Town in 1933. He made 44 Football League appearances for the club in two years, scoring eight goals. In 1936 he joined Blackpool. He played two League games for the Seasiders, scoring in one of them. The following year he signed for Exeter City, for whom he made 79 League appearances and scored 43 goals.

After finishing his professional career at Lancaster Town he was given a permit by the FA to allow him to play for Clanfield as a former professional.
