= Hellenic Football League =

English football league

- Founded: 1953; 73 years ago
- Country: England
- Divisions: 2 (first teams); 2 (reserve & development teams); 2 (veteran teams)
- Number of clubs: 38 (not including teams in reserve & development and veterans leagues)
- Level on pyramid: Levels 9–10 (Premier Division; Division One)
- Feeder to: Southern League
- Promotion to: Southern League Division One Central or South
- Relegation to: Gloucestershire County League; Herefordshire Football League; Oxfordshire Senior League; Thames Valley Premier Football League; Wiltshire League
- Domestic cup(s): FA Cup; FA Vase; League: Challenge Cup; Supplementary Cup; Floodlit Challenge Cup; Premier Division Benevolent Challenge Cup; Division 1 Benevolent Challenge Cup
- Current champions: Slimbridge (Premier); FC Stratford (Division One) (2025–26)
- Website: www.hellenicleague.co.uk
- Current: 2026–27 season

The Hellenic Football League, currently known as the uhlsport Hellenic Football League for sponsorship reasons, is an English men's football league covering an area including the English counties of Gloucestershire, Herefordshire and Worcestershire and their surrounding areas, such as parts of Oxfordshire, Shropshire, Northamptonshire, Wiltshire, and Warwickshire.

== History ==
The league was established in 1953. In the 2000–01 season, the Hellenic League absorbed the Chiltonian League. The league now has a Premier Division and Division One as part of the National League System. The league also runs Division Two East, Division Two West, Division Two North and Division Two South below the National League System. In the 2006–07 season the Hellenic League absorbed the Banbury District and Lord Jersey FA Veterans League with three Divisions now under the Hellenic Veterans League title.

Starting with the 2004–05 re-organisation the Hellenic League became a step 5 and 6 league in the National League System. Premier Division clubs play at Step 5 level, which offers progression to the Southern Football League Division One (Step 4) for Premier Division winners who have the required ground status.

Hellenic League Division One teams play at Step 6 level, promotion to the Step 5 Premier Division can be gained by clubs finishing in the top two of Division One dependent on required ground facilities as specified by The Football Association. Acceptance to HL Division One is offered to teams playing in the various Step 7 county leagues of the related Hellenic League area.

38 teams play in the Hellenic Premier and Division One. 18 teams play at Veterans level (players aged 35 or over).

== Current members ==
=== Step 5 (Premier Division) ===
Premier Division is at Level 9 (Step 5) in the football pyramid above four smaller local leagues below the recognised National League System. There are 21 clubs in this division as of the 26/27 season.

Club	Home ground	Ground capacity
Bradford Town	Bradford on Avon	1,200
Cirencester Town	Corinium Stadium	4,500
Corsham Town	Southbank	1,200
Cribbs	The Lawns	1,000
Droitwich Spa	King George V Ground	2,000
Fairford Town	Cinder Lane	2,000
Hallen AFC	The Hallen Centre	2,000
Hartpury University	Hartpury University Stadium	2,000
Hereford Pegasus	Old School Lane	2,000
Highworth Town	The Elms Recreational Ground	2,000
Longlevens AFC	Saw Mills End	500
Lydney Town	Lydney Recreational Ground	700
Mangotsfield United	Cossham Street	2,500
Pershore Town	Community Stadium	4,000
Roman Glass St George	Oaklands Park	2,000
Royal Wootton Bassett Town	New Gerard Buxton Sports Ground	4,500
Slimbridge	Thornbill Park	1,500
Thornbury Town	Mundy Playing FIeld	1,000
Tuffley Rovers	Glevum Park	1,000
Westfields	allpay.park	2,000
Worcester Raiders	Claines Lane	1,400

=== Step 6 (Division One) ===
Division One is at Level 10 (Step 6) in the football pyramid. There are 18 clubs in this division as of the 26/27 season.

Club	Home ground	Ground capacity
Alcester Town	Stratford Road	1.500
Bewdley Town	Ribbesford Meadows	200
Brimscombe & Thrupp	The Meadow	3,000
Carterton	Kilkenny Lane	1,500
Cheltenham Saracens	Petersfield Park	1,000
Chipping Sodbury Town	The Ridings	1,000
Clanfield 85	Radcot Road	2,000
FC Stratford	Arden Garages Stadium	2,800
Ludlow	Ludlow Football Stadium	1,000
Malmesbury Victoria	The Flying Monk Ground	1,000
Newent Town	Wildsmith Meadow	2,000
Redditch Borough	Cherry Tree Stadium	3,000
Shortwood United	Meadowbank Ground	2,000
Stonehouse Town	Oldends Lane	3,000
Thame United Reserves	Meadow View Park	2,500
Wantage Town	Alfredian Park	1,500
Wellington	Wellington Playing Fields	1,500
Woodford United	Byfield Road	3,000

=== Division Two – "Alliance Leagues" ===
Below Division One, there are two divisions, the Alliance League East and the Alliance League West. These two leagues, with a few exceptions, are made up entirely of reserve or development teams. These two leagues are not formally in the league pyramid, and promotion and relegation into/from the Hellenic League happens from Division one.

== Champions ==
The league started with only a Premier Division, before Division One was added in 1956.

Season	Premier Division	Division One
1953–54	Didcot Town	
1954–55	Witney Town	
1955–56	Headington United 'A'	
1956–57	Abingdon Town	Luton Town Colts
1957–58	Witney Town	Aylesbury Town Corinthians
1958–59	Abingdon Town	Thatcham
1959–60	Abingdon Town	Hazells
1960–61	Bicester Town	Chipping Norton Town
1961–62	Thame United	Botley United
1962–63	Yiewsley reserves	Amersham Town
1963–64	Amersham Town	Henley Town
1964–65	Witney Town	Thatcham
1965–66	Witney Town	Princes Risborough Town
1966–67	Witney Town	Pinehurst
1967–68	Hazells	Henley Town
1968–69	Wallingford Town	Oxford City reserves
1969–70	Thame United	Clanfield
1970–71	Witney Town	Hungerford Town

For the 1971–72 season, Division One was split into Division One A and B.

Season	Premier Division	Division One A	Division One B
1971–72	Witney Town	Fairford Town	Chipping Norton Town

The following season, Division One A and B were merged and a Division Two was created.

Season	Premier Division	Division One	Division Two
1972–73	Witney Town	Thatcham	Walcot

The following season, Division One and Division Two were merged.

Season	Premier Division	Division One
1973–74	Moreton Town	Cirencester Town
1974–75	Thatcham Town	Maidenhead Town
1975–76	Burnham	Abingdon Town
1976–77	Moreton Town	Didcot Town
1977–78	Chipping Norton Town	Bicester Town
1978–79	Newbury Town	Northwood
1979–80	Bicester Town	Hazells
1980–81	Newbury Town	Wantage Town
1981–82	Forest Green Rovers	Lambourn Sports
1982–83	Moreton Town	Rayners Lane
1983–84	Almondsbury Greenway	Morris Motors
1984–85	Shortwood United	Pegasus Juniors
1985–86	Sharpness	Viking Sports
1986–87	Abingdon Town	Bishops Cleeve
1987–88	Yate Town	Cheltenham Town reserves
1988–89	Yate Town	Almondsbury Picksons
1989–90	Newport	Carterton Town
1990–91	Milton United	Cinderford Town
1991–92	Shortwood United	Wollen Sports
1992–93	Wollen Sports	Tuffley Rovers
1993–94	Moreton Town	Carterton Town
1994–95	Cinderford Town	Endsleigh
1995–96	Cirencester Town	Purton
1996–97	Brackley Town	Ardley United
1997–98	Swindon Supermarine	Ardley United
1998–99	Burnham	Pegasus Juniors
1999–2000	Banbury United	Cheltenham Saracens

In 2000, the league absorbed the Chiltonian League and Division One was regionalised into East and West.

Season	Premier Division	Division One	
Season	Premier Division	East	West
2000–01	Swindon Supermarine	Henley Town	Gloucester United
2001–02	North Leigh	Finchampstead	Hook Norton
2002–03	North Leigh	Quarry Nomads	Slimbridge
2003–04	Brackley Town	Wantage Town	Purton
2004–05	Highworth Town	Eton Wick	Shrivenham
2005–06	Didcot Town	Hounslow Borough	Winterbourne United
2006–07	Slimbridge	Bisley Sports	Lydney Town
2007–08	North Leigh	Chalfont Wasps	Winterbourne United
2008–09	Hungerford Town	Binfield	Hardwickes
2009–10	Almondsbury Town	Thame United	Slimbridge
2010–11	Wantage Town	Holyport	Headington Amateurs
2011–12	Oxford City Nomads	Newbury	Tytherington Rocks
2012–13	Marlow	Rayners Lane	Brimscombe & Thrupp
2013–14	Wantage Town	Milton United	Tytherington Rocks
2014–15	Flackwell Heath	Wokingham & Emmbrook	Longlevens
2015–16	Kidlington	Penn & Tylers Green	Carterton
2016–17	Thame United	Penn & Tylers Green	Fairford Town
2017–18	Thatcham Town	Virginia Water	Ardley United
2018–19	Wantage Town	Burnham	Easington Sports
2019–20	Competition abandoned (coronavirus pandemic)		
2020–21	Season abandoned (coronavirus pandemic)		

In 2021, Division One East and West were merged again.

Season	Premier Division	Division One
2021–22	Bishop's Cleeve	Studley
2022–23	Cribbs	Pershore Town
2023–24	Worcester City	Hartpury University
2024–25	Hartpury University	Droitwich Spa
2025–26	Slimbridge	FC Stratford

== Cup winners ==
The Hellenic League football cups are the Supplementary Cup, the Challenge Cup and the Floodlit Cup.

Season	Floodlit Cup	Supplementary Cup	Challenge Cup
1994–95	Cinderford Town		
1995–96	Bicester Town		
1996–97	Abingdon United		
1997–98	Swindon Supermarine		
1998–99	Burnham	Highworth Town	Tuffley Rovers
1999–2000	Swindon Supermarine	Carterton Town	Swindon Supermarine
2000–01	Swindon Supermarine	Cancelled	Carterton Town
2001–02	Gloucester United	Purton	Fairford Town
2002–03	Tuffley Rovers	Didcot Town	Yate Town
2003–04	Slimbridge	Brackley Town	Didcot Town
2004–05	Almondsbury Town	Hungerford Town	Didcot Town
2005–06	Slimbridge	Badshot Lea	Didcot Town
2006–07	Wantage Town	Ardley United	Hungerford Town
2007–08	Kidlington	Shortwood United	Hungerford Town
2008–09	Marlow United	Cancelled	Almondsbury Town
2009–10	Shortwood United	Cancelled	Ardley United
2010–11	Holyport	Kidlington	Holyport
2011–12	Binfield	Reading Town	Highworth Town
2012–13	Ardley United	Headington Amateurs	Oxford City Nomads
2013–14	Brimscombe & Thrupp	Brimscombe & Thrupp	Ascot United
2014–15	North Leigh United	Hook Norton	Ardley United
2015–16	Ascot United	Fairford Town	Flackwell Heath
2016–17	Lydney Town	Ardley United	Bracknell Town
2017–18	Binfield	Holyport	Bracknell Town
2018–19	Ardley United	Thornbury Town	Ascot United
2019–20	Cancelled		
2020–21	Not held	Abingdon United	Kidlington Reserves
2021–22	Not held	Pershore Town	Cribbs
2022–23	Mangotsfield United	Feckenham	Pershore Town
2023–24	Worcester City	FC Stratford	Corsham Town
2024–25	Hartpury University	Stonehouse Town	Cirencester Town
2025–26	Hereford Pegasus	Shortwood United	Longlevens
