= Ardley United F.C. =

Association football club in England

Coordinates: 51°56′46″N 1°12′38″W

Ardley United
- Full name: Ardley United Football Club
- Founded: 1945
- Ground: The Playing Fields, Ardley
- Capacity: 1,000 (100 seated)
- Chairman: Ian Feaver
- Manager: Mark Massingham
- League: Combined Counties League Premier Division North
- 2024–25: Combined Counties League Premier Division North, 11th of 20
Home colours	Away colours

Ardley United Football Club is a football club based in Ardley, near Bicester in Oxfordshire, England. They are members of the Combined Counties League Premier Division North and play at the Playing Fields.

== History ==
Founded in 1945, Ardley spent the majority of their early years in local competitions, primarily the Lord Jersey League, winning the Lord Jersey Cup in 1970 and Division One and the Charity Cup in 1984–85.

In 1988 they moved up to the Oxfordshire Senior League and won Division One at the first attempt, gaining promotion to the Premier Division. The 1990–91 season saw the club win the Premier Division and the Archie Goddard Cup. In 1993 they were promoted to Division One of the Hellenic League. In 1994–95 they won the Division One Cup, retaining it the following season. In the 1996–97 season they won both Division One and the Division One Cup, a feat they repeated the following season.

In 2000, league reorganisation saw the club placed in Division One West. Following improvements to their ground to allow promotion to the Premier Division, a fifth-place finish in 2003–04 led to their moving up to the Premier Division, where they have remained since. In 2006–07 they won the Supplementary Cup, and in the 2009–10 season they won the League Cup. In 2013–14 they won the Oxfordshire Senior Cup for the first time, beating Kidlington 4–0 in the final.

The 2016–17 season saw Ardley win the Supplementary Cup, beating Tuffley Rovers 2–0 in the final. Despite finishing fifth in the Premier Division, they requested voluntary demotion to Division One West due to the departure of the chairman and manager. In 2017–18 they won the Division One West title, earning promotion back to the Premier Division. At the end of the 2020–21 season the club were transferred to the Premier Division of the Spartan South Midlands League. They were transferred to the Premier Division North of the Combined Counties League for the 2023–24 season.

== Ground ==
Ardley United play their home games at the Playing Fields on Oxford Road. The ground has a capacity of 1,000, of which 100 is seated and 200 covered.

== Honours ==
- Hellenic League
  - Division One West champions 2017–18
  - Division One champions 1996–97, 1997–98
  - League Cup winners 2009–10
  - Division One Cup winners 1994–95, 1995–96, 1996–97, 1997–98
  - Supplementary Cup winners 2006–07, 2016–17
- Oxfordshire Senior Cup
  - Winners 2013–14
- Oxfordshire Senior League
  - Premier Division champions 1990–91
  - Division One champions 1988–89
  - Archie Goddard Cup winners 1990–91
- Banbury District and Lord Jersey FA
  - Division One champions 1984–85
  - Lord Jersey Cup winners 1951–52, 1969–70
  - League Cup winners 1987–88
  - Charity Cup winners 1984–85
- Oxfordshire Intermediate Cup
  - Winners 1971–72
- Mid Oxon Cup
  - Winners 1983–84, 1984–85, 1982–86

== Records ==
- Best FA Cup performance: Second qualifying round, 2014–15
- Best FA Vase performance: Third round, 2012–13
- Record attendance: 327 vs Oxford United, Oxfordshire Senior Cup, 30 January 2018
- Biggest win: 8–0 vs Hilltop, Combined Counties League Premier Division North, 7 April 2026

== See also ==
- Ardley United F.C. players
- Ardley United F.C. managers
