= Highworth Town F.C. =

Association football club in England

Coordinates: 51°37′40.64″N 1°42′49.27″W

Highworth Town
- Full name: Highworth Town Football Club
- Nickname: The Worthians
- Founded: 1893
- Ground: The Elms Recreation Ground, Highworth
- Capacity: 2,000 (150 seated)
- Chairman: Rohan Haines
- Manager: Ashley Edenborough
- League: Hellenic League Premier Division
- 2025–26: Hellenic League Premier Division, 12th of 20
Home colours	Away colours

Highworth Town Football Club is a football club based in Highworth, Wiltshire, England. They are currently members of the Hellenic League Premier Division and play at the Elms Recreation Ground

== History ==
The club was established in 1893. In 1909–10 they won the Advertiser Cup and the Swindon Junior Cup. Three years later the Advertiser Cup was won for a second time. The club later joined the Cirencester & District League and were Division Two champions in 1931–32. They then moved to the Swindon & District League, winning both the Division Three title and the Swindon Junior Cup in 1933–34. The club won the Division Three title again in 1954–55, the first of four successive titles that saw them win Division Two the following season, Division One in 1956–57 and then the Premier Division in 1957–58.

Highworth retained the Premier Division title the following season, also winning the Advertiser Cup and the Faringdon Thursday Cup. They went on to dominate the league in the 1960s, winning the Premier Division title in 1960–61, 1961–62, 1962–63, 1963–64, 1965–66, 1966–67 and 1967–68. They also won the Wiltshire Senior Cup for the first time in 1963–64. The club then joined the Wiltshire Combination, finishing as Division Two runners-up in 1970–71, earning promotion to the Premier Division. In 1976 the Combination merged with the Wiltshire League to form the Wiltshire County League, with Highworth becoming members of Senior Division One.

In 1978–79 Highworth finished bottom of Division One and were relegated to Division Two. Although they were promoted the following season, they were relegated again at the end of the 1980–81 season. A third-place finish in Division Two in 1982–83 saw the club promoted to Division One, and after finishing tenth the following season, they were accepted into Division One of the Hellenic League. They won the Division One Cup in 1988–89.

Highworth remained in Division One until a third-place finish in 1993–94 resulted in promotion to the Premier Division. They won the Supplementary Cup in 1998–99 and were Premier Division runners-up the following season before winning the league in 2004–05. The club won the Challenge Cup in 2011–12. The 2014–15 season saw the club reach the semi-finals of the FA Vase, eventually losing 3–0 on aggregate to North Shields. After finishing third in the Premier Division in 2017–18, they were promoted to Division One South of the Southern League. They were transferred to Division One Central for the 2022–23 season, but finished third-from-bottom of the division and were relegated to the Premier Division of the Hellenic League.

== Ground ==
The club play at the Elms Recreation Ground and following their Hellenic League title win in 2004–05, two separate seated stands were built on one touchline, with the existing seated stand removed and replaced by a covered standing area. Both ends of the pitch and the other touchline have uncovered hardstanding. Floodlights were installed and inaugurated with a friendly match against QPR in July 1994, at which the club's record attendance of 2,000 was set. The pitch had a noticeable slope until September 2026 when it was levelled to install the current artificial pitch.

The ground currently has a capacity of 2,000, of which 150 is seated and 250 covered.

== Honours ==
- Hellenic League
  - Premier Division champions 2004–05
  - Challenge Cup winners 2011–12
  - Supplementary Cup winners 1998–99,
  - Division One Cup winners 1988–89
- Swindon & District League
  - Premier Division champions 1957–58, 1958–59, 1960–61, 1961–62, 1962–63, 1963–64, 1965–66, 1966–67, 1967–68
  - Division One champions 1956–57
  - Division Two champions 1955–56
  - Division Three champions 1933–34, 1954–55
  - Division Four champions 1961–62
- Cirencester & District League
  - Division Two champions 1931–32
- Wiltshire Senior Cup
  - Winners 1963–64, 1972–73, 1995–96, 1997–98, 2008–09, 2014–15
- Advertiser Cup
  - Winners 1909–10, 1912–13, 1958–59, 1959–60, 1967–68
- Faringdon Thursday Cup
  - Winners 1957–58, 1960–61, 1961–62, 1962–63, 1965–66, 1975–76, 1976–77
- Swindon Junior Cup
  - Winners 1909–10, 1933–34
- Wiltshire Junior Cup
  - Winners 1956–57

== Records ==
- Best FA Cup performance: Third qualifying round, 2003–04
- Best FA Trophy performance: Third qualifying round, 2020–21
- Best FA Vase performance: Semi-finals, 2014–15
- Record attendance: 2,000 vs Queens Park Rangers, friendly match, July 1994
- Most appearances: Rod Haines
- Most goals: Kevin Higgs

== See also ==
- Highworth Town F.C. players
