= Tuffley Rovers F.C. =

Association football club in England

Coordinates: 51°50′24.01″N 2°15′44.03″W

Tuffley Rovers
- Full name: Tuffley Rovers Football Club
- Nickname: The Rovers
- Founded: 1929
- Ground: Glevum Park; Gloucester; Gloucestershire; England
- Capacity: 1,000 (200 seats, 300 covered standing)
- Chairman: Dan Boon
- Manager: Neil Mustoe
- League: Hellenic League Premier Division
- 2025–26: Hellenic League Premier Division, 10th of 20
Home colours	Away colours

Tuffley Rovers F.C. are a football club based in Tuffley in Gloucester, England. The club is playing in the Hellenic League Premier Division, the 9th level of the English football league system. The club is affiliated to the Gloucestershire County FA. The club operates four Saturday male adult sides, a Ladies' team and a Veterans' squad, playing Sundays.

The club's reserve team also competes in Hellenic League structure, in Division Two (West), with two sides playing in the Stroud and District League. In addition to the adult set-up, there is a full youth structure, with teams at all ages from U7s to U18s.

== History ==
Formed in 1929, Tuffley Rovers spent many years playing in the Stroud and District League and North Gloucestershire Association League before promotion to the Gloucestershire Northern Senior League and in the 1988–89 season they joined the Gloucestershire County League and were champions in 1991. In 1993, they were Hellenic League Division One champions and were promoted to the Premier Division. Under the management of Doug Foxwell they regularly finished in the top half of the Hellenic League, and were considered widely to be the second team in Gloucester, behind Gloucester City. However, during the 2005–06 season, they resigned from the Premier Division due to financial difficulties and their record was expunged.

Their first team took the spot of their reserve team in the second level of the Gloucestershire Northern Senior League (level 13) and gained back-to-back promotions to return to the Gloucestershire County League. Rovers finished the 2007–08 season in a respectable 4th place in the Gloucestershire County League, but struggled for consistency in 2008–09 under new manager Shayne Bradley with the highlight of the season probably being the 10–0 victory over DRG Stapleton. Doug Foxwell returned to manage the side for the 2011–12 season, with the team finishing a creditable third, before they finally achieved promotion back to the Hellenic League at the end of the 2012–13 season.

Foxwell left the club at Christmas in 2013–14 and after John Hamilton saw the club to a position of safety at the end of the season, former player Warren Evans took over as manager, achieving promotion back to the Hellenic League, Premier Division at the end of his first season (2014–15).

After a difficult 2015–16 season, Evans departed with his team struggling to retain their place in the division. Shayne Bradley took on a caretaker manager role and Rovers ended up 17th of twenty teams and in a relegation position but retained their Premier Division status, as only three clubs were relegated.

The appointment of Mark Pritchett in the summer of 2016 was followed by two successive 10th-place finishes, as Rovers consolidated their place in the Hellenic League, Premier Division.

Mark Pritchett resigned in August 2020, with his assistant Richard Cox becoming caretaker manager in a season interrupted by the Covid pandemic. Cox was then appointed as manager ahead of the 2021–22 playing season, only to resign on 19 December 2021 after a run of ten consecutive defeats.

Neil Mustoe was then appointed Interim Manager for the remainder of the season, before being confirmed as the permanent appointment at the conclusion of the 2021–22 season. He has been in post since, guiding the club to an 18th place finish that was enough to avoid relegation in 2022–23 and then a 14th place finish in 2023–24.

== Current playing squad ==
Note: Flags indicate national team as defined under FIFA eligibility rules; some limited exceptions apply. Players may hold more than one non-FIFA nationality.

No.	Pos.	Nation	Player
—	GK	ENG	Luke Merchant
—	DF	ENG	Macaulay Herbert
—	DF	ENG	Eli Simpson
—	DF	ENG	Mark Pritchett
—	DF	ENG	Ellis Clifford
—	DF	ENG	Josh Stevens
—	DF	ENG	Daniel Lander
—	MF	ENG	Callum McGuirk
—	MF	ENG	Dean Turner
—	MF	CAN	Cole Clinton

No.	Pos.	Nation	Player
—	MF	ENG	Matt Lee
—	MF	ENG	Liam Smith
—	MF	ENG	Warren Mann
—	MF	ENG	Corey Warrington
—	MF	ENG	Kieran Alder
—	MF	ENG	Harley Mustoe
—	FW	ENG	Connor Walters
—	FW	ENG	Yeshaya Lomotey
—	FW	ENG	Brad Bevan
—	FW	ENG	Karnell Chambers
—	FW	ENG	Tyrel Roberts

== Honours ==
- Hellenic Football League Division One
  - Champions 1992–93
- Gloucestershire County League
  - Champions 1990–91

== Records ==
Tuffley Rovers have not had much success in the national FA competitions. Their best result in the FA Cup was a 2nd qualifying round defeat in 1999–2000 to Lymington & New Milton, while they reached the 2nd round in the FA Vase in the 1994–95 season.
