= Amersham Town F.C. =

Association football club in England

Coordinates: 51.6703°N 0.6242°W

Amersham Town
- Full name: Amersham Town Football Club
- Nickname: The Magpies
- Founded: 1890
- Ground: Spratleys Meadow, Amersham
- Chairman: Peter Nelson
- Manager: Jason Owens
- League: Combined Counties League Premier Division North
- 2025–26: Combined Counties League Premier Division North, 19th of 20
- Website: amershamtownfc.com
Home colours	Away colours

Amersham Town Football Club is a football club based in Amersham, Buckinghamshire, England. Founded in 1890, the club are currently members of the Combined Counties League Premier Division North and play at Spratleys Meadow.

== History ==
The club was formed in the Crown Hotel at a meeting on 13 October 1890. The meeting was chaired by E. B. Cooper, headmaster of Dr Challoner's Grammar School, who had been recommended to the school by W. G. Grace. The club rules were agreed four days later, and the club's first match took place in November, with Amersham losing 2–1 to Wycombe Marsh at Barn Meadow. In 1902–03 they won the Wycombe and District Combination League. After World War I the club were league champions again in 1919–20 and 1920–21. In 1923 they joined Division Two of the Spartan League, remaining members until leaving the league in 1929. The club rejoined the league in 1935 and were placed in Division Two West.

Following World War II Amersham did not rejoin the Spartan League for the 1945–46 season. The club later became members of Division Two of the Great Western Combination in 1949. In 1953 they were founder members of the Hellenic League, winning the inaugural League Cup in 1953–54. The club's reserve team also joined the league in 1956, playing in Division One until 1960. The club finished bottom of the Premier Division in 1961 and would have been relegated to Division One, but switched to the London League for the 1961–62 season. However, after just one season in the London League they returned to the Hellenic League and were placed in Division One. They won Division One in 1962–63, earning promotion to the Premier Division, where they were league champions the following season. After finishing as runners-up in 1964–65 and 1965–66 the club went into decline, and were relegated to Division One B at the end of the 1970–71 season, in which they finished bottom of the Premier Division.

In 1972 Amersham switched to the Spartan League, finishing bottom of the table in the following three seasons. In 1975 the league was expanded to two divisions following a merger with the Metropolitan–London League and was renamed the London Spartan League. Amersham were placed in Division Two. After finishing as runners-up in 1979–80 they were promoted to the renamed Premier Division. In 1997 the Spartan League merged with the South Midlands League to form the Spartan South Midlands League. Placed in the Premier Division South, the club finished second from bottom in 1997–98 and were placed in the Senior Division for the 1998–99 season. The division was renamed Division One prior to the start of the 2001–02 season, in which they finished bottom of the table and were relegated to Division Two.

Despite finishing second-from-bottom of Division Two in 2003–04, Amersham were promoted to Division One as the division was short of clubs and they were one of the few in Division Two to have floodlights, a requirement to meet the ground grading criteria. They remained in Division One until a last-place finish in 2014–15 saw them relegated to Division Two. The following season saw them finish twelfth, and although they were initially thought to have been promoted back to Division One due to clubs finishing above them having failed ground grading rules, this was later reversed and the club remained in Division Two. However, after a sixth-place finish in 2016–17 they were promoted to Division One.

In 2022–23 Amersham finished fourth in Division One, qualifying for the promotion play-offs. However, they were beaten 4–0 by Rugby Borough in the semi-finals. At the end of the season the club were transferred to Division One of the Combined Counties League. The following season saw the club win the division with 111 points, earning promotion to the Premier Division North.

== Ground ==
The club initially played at Barn Meadow, and soon began using the adjacent Eagle pub as a base. In 1920 they moved to Spratleys Meadow, which was leased from the club's first president, Squire Tyrwhitt Drake, for an initial £10 per year. The lease was bought by George Brazil in 1953, with Brazil also becoming club president; the lease was later transferred to the Brazil Trust and runs to 2097.

New dressing rooms were opened in 1930s and a new stand built in 1935. During World War II the council used the changing rooms as an emergency mortuary. A clubhouse was added in 1968, with a wooden classroom building purchased from a private school. Floodlights were installed in 1977 and the clubhouse extended in 1983. The Great Storm of 1987 saw the stand blown into the nearby allotments and it was not until 1997 that a new stand was opened by ex-England manager Graham Taylor to replace it. The allotments were later converted into youth team pitches for the club. During the 2006–07 season new changing rooms were built and the slope on the pitch was levelled, with Amersham playing at Beaconsfield SYCOB while Spratleys Meadow was unavailable.

== Honours ==
- Hellenic League
  - Premier Division champions 1963–64
  - Division One champions 1962–63
  - League Cup winners 1953–54
- Combined Counties Football League
  - Division One champions 2023–24
- Wycombe and District Combination League
  - Champions 1902–03, 1919–20, 1920–21
- Berks & Bucks Junior Cup
  - Winners 1922–23
- Wycombe Challenge Cup
  - Winners 1923–24
- St Mary's Cup
  - Winners 1990–91

== Records ==
- Best FA Cup performance: Third qualifying round, 2024–25
- Best FA Vase performance: Third round, 1977–78

== See also ==
- Amersham Town F.C. players
