= Almondsbury Town A.F.C. =

Coordinates: 51°32′56.21″N 2°34′18.60″W

Almondsbury Town
- Full name: Almondsbury Town Association Football Club
- Nickname(s): The Almonds
- Founded: 1897 (as Almondsbury Greenway)
- Dissolved: 2012
- Ground: Scott Park, Patchway
- 2011–12: Bristol & Suburban League Premier Division One, 13th
Home colours	Away colours

Almondsbury Town Association Football Club was a football club based in Almondsbury, near Bristol, England. Their colours were sky blue and white shirts, with navy blue shorts and socks and they club were affiliated to the Gloucestershire County FA.

== History ==
=== Early days ===
Although Almondsbury boasts a team dating from the 1870s, the exact date of formation was not known. A local football reporter, David Hughes, from the Evening Post, discovered the club that became Almondsbury Town as we know it were formed in 1897. This discovery came from the Gloucestershire Football Association's list of teams for the 1899–1900 season of which Almondsbury were at the top. The club colours then were light and dark blue. The original base for the club which is still there was The Swan Hotel. There is also little evidence of any major achievement during a lengthy period in the Bristol & Suburban League and it was not until the 1970s, some 100 years later that the side became a force in local soccer.

=== Almondsbury Greenway ===
In 1974 Almondsbury merged with another local club, Greenway Sports. It was a merger of convenience for both parties. Greenway, who had been Bristol Premier Combination champions on 5 successive occasions, needed a private ground in order to progress; Almondsbury had the ground but not the appropriate playing strength. With the formation of a new club, Almondsbury Greenway, they immediately gained election to the Gloucestershire County League, where they finished runners up in their first season. Five successive championships followed before they were once again runners up in season 1981–82. It was during this period that the club achieved its greatest moment, reaching the final of the FA Vase at Wembley Stadium in 1979, where they were beaten by Billericay Town. Season 1982–983 saw the club promoted to the Hellenic League where, in their first season, they finished second to Moreton Town. The following year the roles were reversed, with Almondsbury Greenway not only winning the championship, but also taking the League Cup; retained the following season.

=== Almondsbury Picksons ===
After ten seasons of finishing in the top two of any league in which they competed, a lean spell inevitably followed. After relegation to the Hellenic League Division One it was realised that total independence was essential to the club's future progress. The club left the Almondsbury Sports Complex and after a brief nomadic existence, another merger, this time with Badminton Picksons, led to the formation of Almondsbury Picksons, and a new ground across the road called Oaklands Park. The new ground was completed for the 1988–89 season and the off the field efforts were rewarded by clinching the Division One title and a return to Premier Division status.

=== Almondsbury Town F.C. ===
At the end of season 1992–1993, following a period of financial difficulties, the club was regretfully placed in the hands of the liquidator. It was, however, allowed to continue under yet another name, Almondsbury Town Football Club. After a period of some eighteen months, Oaklands Park was finally purchased by the Gloucestershire Football Association for their new headquarters. The club successfully negotiated a lease arrangement for the clubhouse and ground, and in 1995 its Youth XI won the club's first trophy as Almondsbury Town, carrying off the Gloucestershire Youth Shield and the Youth League Cup. After a period of 12 years moving between mid-table mediocrity and flirting with relegation, the first trophy for the senior side under the chairmanship of Bob Jenkins was secured in the form of the Floodlit Cup in 2005. With new appointments made to the management team in 2005, the club progressed both on and off the field. In the 2006–07 season the club managed its highest league position in over 20 years and reached the final of the Gloucestershire Football Association Challenge Trophy where they finished runners up after a 2–0 defeat to Slimbridge.

In 2007–08 the club had another very successful season but lost out on promotion to the Southern League to North Leigh by a goal difference of two after both teams finished on 96 points. Runners up spot was also achieved in the Hellenic League Cup Final after a 2–1 defeat by Hungerford Town. 2008–09 saw The Almonds finish in 4th position, 6 points behind the eventual league champions Hungerford Town. This time though, the Almonds went one better than last season and secured the SBJ Insurance Brokers League Challenge Cup with a 1–0 victory over Carterton. The 2009–10 season began with high hopes with Paul Weeks in charge of the team but he decided to try his luck at Cinderford Town after only ten unbeaten games. He was replaced by Richard Thompson, formerly of Yate Town and accompanied by his assistant there Lee Barlass. It didn't take long for a massive change in personnel and the results justified this decision as the Almonds return to title winning ways, securing the Hellenic League championship and the GFA Challenge Trophy double, and achieving promotion to the Southern League for the 2010–11 season.

=== Resignation from the Southern League ===
In April 2011 the club announced that they were withdrawing from the Southern League's 2011–12 season and disbanding the first team with a look to reviewing the club's status altogether over the summer citing failure to find a ground share as the main cause. In response the Gloucestershire Football Association (GFA) released a statement advising that it was Almondsbury Town's decision to leave Oaklands Park, originally in April 2010, that prompted them to find new tenants and that an agreement had been struck with Winterbourne United and Roman Glass St George FC in October of that same year. Almondsbury Town then released a statement which advised that they could not move away from Oaklands Park for the 2010–11 season due to a conflict with league rules meaning their proposed move to Clevedon fell through. The statement also indicates that they applied to the GFA to extend their lease at Oaklands Park as part of the GFA's search for tenants but that their application was turned down. In the same statement the club revealed that since 2009 they were never offered a lease longer than one year and as such were disappointed to find that Winterbourne United and Roman Glass St. George had been given a three-year lease.

The club subsequently dropped into the Bristol & Suburban League Premier Division One, finishing bottom of the table in 2011–12, after which they folded.

=== League history ===
Season	Division	Position	Significant events
As Almondsbury Greenway
Joined the Gloucestershire County League
1975–76	Gloucestershire County League	2	Runners-up
1976–77	Gloucestershire County League	1	Champions
1977–78	Gloucestershire County League	1	Champions
1978–79	Gloucestershire County League	1	Champions
1979–80	Gloucestershire County League	1	Champions
1980–81	Gloucestershire County League	1	Champions
1981–82	Gloucestershire County League	2	Runners-up
Joined the Hellenic League Premier Division
1982–83	Hellenic League Premier Division	2	Runners-up
1983–84	Hellenic League Premier Division	1	Champions
1984–85	Hellenic League Premier Division	10	–
1985–86	Hellenic League Premier Division	17	Relegated
1986–87	Hellenic League Division One	17	–
As Almondsbury Picksons
1987–88	Hellenic League Division One	4	–
1988–89	Hellenic League Division One	1	Champions
1989–90	Hellenic League Premier Division	7	–
1990–91	Hellenic League Premier Division	10	–
1991–92	Hellenic League Premier Division	3	–
1992–93	Hellenic League Premier Division	6	–
As Almondsbury Town
1993–94	Hellenic League Premier Division	15	–
1994–95	Hellenic League Premier Division	12	–
1995–96	Hellenic League Premier Division	12	–
1996–97	Hellenic League Premier Division	15	–
1997–98	Hellenic League Premier Division	5	–
1998–99	Hellenic League Premier Division	16	–
1999–2000	Hellenic League Premier Division	17	–
2000–01	Hellenic League Premier Division	19	–
2001–02	Hellenic League Premier Division	18	–
2002–03	Hellenic League Premier Division	17	–
2003–04	Hellenic League Premier Division	21	–
2004–05	Hellenic League Premier Division	9	–
2005–06	Hellenic League Premier Division	14	–
2006–07	Hellenic League Premier Division	5	–
2007–08	Hellenic League Premier Division	2	Runners-up
2008–09	Hellenic League Premier Division	4	
2009–10	Hellenic League Premier Division	1	Champions
2010–11	Southern League Division One South & West	8	Resigned
Joined the Bristol and Suburban League
2011–12	Bristol and Suburban League Premier Division	13	Folded
Source: Almondsbury Town at the Football Club History Database
