= Chipping Norton Town F.C. =

Association football club in England

Coordinates: 51°55′54.76″N 1°33′02.62″W

Chipping Norton Town
- Full name: Chipping Norton Town Football Club
- Nickname: Magpies
- Founded: 1893
- Dissolved: 2016
- Ground: Walterbush Road, Chipping Norton
- Chairman: Tym Soper
Home colours

Chipping Norton Town Football Club was a football club based in Chipping Norton, Oxfordshire. They played at Walterbush Road.

== History ==
The club was established in 1893. After winning back-to-back Oxfordshire Senior League titles in 1951–52 and 1952–53, they became founder members of the Hellenic League in 1953. They were placed in the Premier Division when the league added a second division in 1956, but were relegated to Division One after finishing bottom of the table in 1959–60. However, they won Division One at the first attempt to return to the Premier Division. They were relegated again at the end of the 1969–70 season. In 1971–72 they were placed in Division One B, which they won at the first attempt to earn promotion back to the Premier Division. In 1976–77 the club won the Oxfordshire Senior Cup, a feat which they repeated the following season, in which they were also Premier Division champions.

In 1979 the club switched to Division One of the Midland Combination, which they won in 1981–82. The following season, the club made their debut in the FA Cup, losing to Highgate United in the preliminary qualification round. However that season saw them have other cup success when they won the league's Charity Shield and the Tony Allden Cup. In 1984 they left the league to return to the Oxfordshire Senior League due to mounting debts. In 1986 the club moved back up to Division One of the Hellenic League, where they remained until leaving in 1993, when the club disbanded due to financial difficulties. However, they reformed and by 1996–97 seasons were competing again in the Oxfordshire Senior Football League. In 2001 they were accepted into Division One West of the Hellenic League. After finishing second in 2002–03 they were promoted to the Premier Division. However, they withdrew from the league during the 2006–07 season due to a lack of volunteers.

The club in the 2008–09 season competed in Division two of the Witney and District League, where they finished as Runners-up and won promotion to Division One. The club gained promotion to the Premier Division at the end of the 2011–12 season when they finished as Runners-up.

They resigned from the Hellenic Football League in favour of the Witney & District Football League.

The club folded in 2016 after the ground was sold to be used as a site for a new housing development. Chipping Norton Town Swifts F.C. were created as a phoenix club in its place.

== Ground ==
Chipping Norton Town play their home games at Walterbush Road, Chipping Norton, Oxfordshire, OX7 5DP.

== Honours ==
=== League honours ===
- Hellenic Football League Premier Division :
  - champions (1): 1977–78
- Hellenic Football League Division One:
  - champions (1): 1960–61
- Hellenic Football League Division One B:
  - champions (1): 1971–72
- Hellenic Football League Division One West:
  - Runners-up (1): 2002–03
- Midland Football Combination Premier Division :
  - champions (1): 1981–82
- Oxfordshire Senior Football League Premier Division :
  - champions (2): 1949–50, 1950–51
- Witney and District League Division One:
  - Runners-up (1): 2011–12
- Witney and District League Division Two:
  - Runners-up (1): 2008–09

=== Cup honours ===
- Oxfordshire Senior Cup:
  - Winners (2): 1976–77, 1977–78
- Midland Football Combination Charity Shield :
  - Winners (1): 1982–83
- Midland Football Combination Tony Allden Cup :
  - Winners (1): 1982–83
- Oxfordshire Senior Football League Clarendon Cup :
  - Winners (1): 1996–97

== Records ==
- Highest League Position: 1st in Hellenic premier Division 1977–78
- FA Cup best performance: Preliminary qualifying round 1982–83, 1983–84
- FA Vase best performance: Fourth round 1974–75, 1980–81

== Former players ==
1. Players that have played/managed in the football league or any foreign equivalent to this level (i.e. fully professional league).
2. Players with full international caps.
- (England) Phil Heath
- (England) Alan Judge

== Former coaches ==
1. Managers/Coaches that have played/managed in the football league or any foreign equivalent to this level (i.e. fully professional league).
2. Managers/Coaches with full international caps.
- (England) Phil Heath
