= Clanfield F.C. =

Association football club in England

Clanfield
- Full name: Clanfield (April 1985) Football Club
- Nickname: The Robins
- Founded: 1890 (reformed 1985)
- Ground: Radcot Road, Clanfield, Oxfordshire
- Capacity: 2000
- Manager: Jamie Butt
- Coach: Jordi Mulvany
- League: Hellenic League Division One
- 2025–26: Hellenic League Division One, 16th of 18
Home colours	Away colours

Clanfield F.C. is an association football club in Clanfield, near Carterton, England. The club is affiliated to the Oxfordshire County Football Association. Clanfield F.C. compete in the Hellenic League Division One, and the club's reserve team in Division Two West.

== History ==
There is evidence that the club was formed in 1890 and played on a field near Chestlion Farm, before moving to a pitch in the mid twentieth century near Faringdon road. The club joined the North Berks Football League for the 1924–25 season, and finished as winners of Division 2 (Faringdon) in their debut season. They remained in the North Berks league for another season before leaving.

After winning the Witney and District League in 1966–67, the club joined the Hellenic Football League starting in Division One. After finishing as champions two seasons later, they gained promotion to the Premier Division. They then spent the next ten years in the Premier Division, during which time they made their debut in the FA Vase. The team finished as runners-up twice before being relegated back to Division One at the end of the 1979–80 season, but gained promotion once again following a second-place finish in the 1980–81 season, only missing out on the title by goal difference.

In the 1984–85 season, the club finished bottom of the Premier Division, and in April of 1985, the club was reformed under the name of Clanfield Football Club. The new club took over from Clanfield's place in the Hellenic league and started the 1985–86 season in Division One. The club then remained in Division One of the Hellenic League until being placed in Division One West following the league's restructuring for the 2000–01 season.

During the course of the 2005–06 season, floodlights were installed at the ground, allowing the club access to the league's floodlight cup competition, and further ground enhancements saw the installation of new dugouts and seats in the main stand.

The 2010–11 season saw the club finish in fourth place in Division One West, just three points from a second-place finish and promotion to the Premier Division. This season also saw the club make their debut in the FA Cup, losing to Fareham Town in their first ever game in the extra preliminary qualification round. In the following seasons since they have finished 8th, 11th, 5th, and 9th.

As of 2015, a series of further ground improvement works were ongoing, including fencing, a concrete walkway around the ground, and dressing room improvements.

Season 2015–16 was regarded as one of transition as manager Peter Osborne started to focus more on youth development. The club eventually finished the season in third-to-last.

The summer of 2016 saw long-serving Chairman John Osborne stand down, as well as the retirement of long-serving groundsman Geoff Collet.

== Ground ==
Clanfield play their home games at Radcot Road, Clanfield, Oxfordshire, OX18 2ST.

== Honours ==
=== League honours ===
- Hellenic Football League Premier Division :
  - Runners-up (2): 1972–73, 1973–74
- Hellenic Football League Division One:
  - Winners (1): 1969–70
  - Runners-up (1): 1980–81
- North Berks Football League Division Two (Faringdon):
  - Winners (1): 1924–25

=== Cup honours ===
- Hellenic Football League Premier Division Cup:
  - Winners (1): 1973–74
- Hellenic Football League Premier Division Cup:
  - Winners (1): 1985–86
- Oxfordshire Junior Cup:
  - Winners (1): 1932–33
- Witney Senior Challenge Cup:
  - Winners (1): 1932–33
- Faringdon Memorial Cup:
  - Runners-up (2): 2004–05, 2012–13

== Records ==
- Highest League Position: 2nd in Hellenic premier Division 1972–73, 1973–74
- FA Cup best performance: Extra Preliminary qualifying round 2010–11, 2011–12
- FA Vase best performance: Fourth round 1974–75
- Highest Attendance: 197 v Kidlington – 26 August 2002

== Former players ==
1. Players that have played/managed in the football league or any foreign equivalent to this level (i.e. fully professional league).
2. Players with full international caps.
- (England) Harry Bowl

== Former coaches ==
1. Managers/Coaches that have played/managed in the football league or any foreign equivalent to this level (i.e. fully professional league).
2. Managers/Coaches with full international caps.
- (England) John Shuker
- (England) Pat Quartermain
