= Lambourn Sports F.C. =

Association football club in England

Lambourn Sports
- Full name: Lambourn Sports Football Club
- Nickname: Ams
- Founded: 1909
- Ground: Lambourn Sports Club, Lambourn
- Chairman: Nick Rackham
- Manager: Vacant
- League: Swindon & District League Premier Division
- 2025–26: Wiltshire League Division One (withdrew)
Home colours	Away colours

Lambourn Sports are a football club based in the village of Lambourn, near Newbury, in Berkshire. The club are currently members of the Swindon & District League Premier Division and play at Lambourn Sports Club.

== History ==
Lambourn football club started playing in 1909, on the site that would become Lambourn Sports Club, and were possibly called The Linnets. The clubs red and white shirts were originally used when the well-known jockey Tommy Robbins, donated the red and white kit to the club.

It was in 1946 that Lambourn football club became known as Lambourn Sports FC. It was in this year that the football club suggested a public meeting for the creation of a Sports Club combining all the existing sporting Clubs, such as Cricket, tennis and Bowls into one, as well as starting other sports if members wished. All the local clubs were in attendance attended and meeting chaired by Mr J C Wing, as he was a member or official of all the Lambourn clubs pre-war, was begun. After the meeting, it was announced, on 24 June 1946 that a Lambourn Sports Club would be created to "promote and encourage all sports and recreation for the enjoyment of its members". After the meeting the club purchased a second hand clubhouse in September 1946. It was erected on land belonging to Mr E T Bracey which was already being used by the football, tennis and Bowls teams. Initially the Club rented the land from Mr E T Bracey but in 1955 was able to purchase it for £700.

In 1962, the club joined Division One of the Hellenic Football League and gained promotion to the Premier Division in that same year, as runners-up. They remained in this league until the end of the 1966–67 season when they were relegated back to Division One, staying there for five seasons, before leaving the Hellenic league to join the North Berks Football League for the 1972–73 season. The club rejoined the Hellenic league again for the 1977–78, in Division one, and were promoted as champions back to the premier division in the 1981–82 season. However they only lasted a season in the top division, and had to wait 12 seasons until the end of the 1994–95 season before getting back to the top division. That season the club also did a league and cup double by winning the Berks and Bucks Senior Trophy under the management of Swindon Town legend Don Rogers.

They then spent two seasons in the premier division, during which they reached the final of the Berks and Bucks senior Trophy again and played for the first and so far only time in the FA vase competition, losing 1–0 at home to Bournemouth F.C. At the end of those two years despite finishing in a midtable position, the club left the league to rejoin the North Berks league, but starting in Division four. The club then spent the next three seasons getting back up to the top division, winning all the lower divisions on the way. The club then spent the next eleven seasons in the top division of the North Berks league, winning it on three occasions, with the last occasion at the end of the 2010–11 season, the club rejoined the Hellenic league in Division One East. After 2 years the club resigned from the Hellenic League and entered the North Berks League one for the season 2013/14 but due to lack of players the team was disbanded early in the season. A new committee was then formed and both a first team and a reserve team were formed in readiness for the 2014/15 campaign with the first team in North Berks 2 and the Reserves in North Berks 5 They did intend to start the 2021–2022 season in the Wiltshire Senior League, although player shortages and difficulties recruiting a new manager mean they will now revert to playing in the North Berkshire League as they had done previously.

== Ground ==
Lambourn Sports play their games at Lambourn Sports club, Bockhampton Road, Lambourn RG17 8PS.

== Honours ==
- Hellenic Football League Division One:
  - Winners: 1981–82
  - Runners-up 1961–62
- North Berks Football League Division One:
  - Winners: 2005–06, 2007–08, 2010–11
  - Runners-up 2003–04
- North Berks Football League Division Two:
  - Winners: 1999–2000
- North Berks Football League Division Three:
  - Winners: 1998–99
- North Berks Football League Division Four:
  - Winners: 1997–98
- Berks and Bucks Senior Trophy:
  - Winners: 1994–95
  - Runners-up 1995–96
- Reading Senior Cup:
  - Winners: 1959–60
- North Berks Cup:
  - Winners: 2005–06
  - Runners-up 1998–99, 2004–05, 2006–07
- North Berks Charity Shield:
  - Winners: 2003–04, 2005–06, 2010–11
  - Runners-up 1998–99
- North Berks War Memorial Cup:
  - Winners: 1998–99, 1999–2000

== Club records ==
- Highest League Position: 3rd in Hellenic premier Division 1995–96
- FA Vase best performance: First qualifying round 1996–97

== Former coaches ==
1. Managers/Coaches that have played/managed in the football league or any foreign equivalent to this level (i.e. fully professional league).
2. Managers/Coaches with full international caps.
- (England) Don Rogers
