= Didcot Town F.C. =

Association football club in England

Coordinates: 51°36′51″N 1°14′23″W

Didcot Town
- Full name: Didcot Town Football Club
- Nicknames: Diddy, The Railwaymen, The Artillerymen, The Gunners
- Founded: 1907
- Ground: Loop Meadow Stadium, Didcot
- Capacity: 3,000 (350 Seated)
- Chairman: John Bailey
- Manager: Jamie Heapy
- League: Southern League Division One Central
- 2025–26: Southern League Division One South, 13th of 22 (transferred)
Home colours	Away colours

Didcot Town Football Club are a football club based in Didcot in Oxfordshire, England. The club is affiliated to the Berks & Bucks Football Association They won the FA Vase in 2005 and are currently members of Division One Central of the Southern League, having been relegated from the Premier Division in 2023-24.

The first team is currently managed by Jamie Heapy and his assistant manager Paul Bedwell.

== History ==
The club was founded in 1907 and in their early days competed in the North Berks League from the 1910–11 season. They left the North Berks league at the end of the 1927–28 campaign and later joined the Reading League and then the Metropolitan League. They then became founder members of the Hellenic League in 1953, where they won the championship at the first attempt. Although they returned to the Metropolitan League for the 1957–58 season, they rejoined the Hellenic League Premier Division in 1963.

They spent the next thirteen seasons in the premier division before being relegated to Division one at the end of the 1975–76 season, the same season they made their debut in the FA Cup; however, they bounced back up as champions of Division one the next season. They moved between the Hellenic League's two divisions on two more occasions before they established themselves for the rest of their time in the top flight of the Hellenic league from the 1995–96 season. In 2004–05, under manager Stuart Peace, they were only denied the title due to the deduction of one point for fielding an ineligible player in a 1–1 draw at Tuffley Rovers at the start of the season, but made up for it by beating A.F.C. Sudbury to claim the FA Vase. The following season they finally claimed the league title, becoming the first team in Hellenic League history to accrue 100 points in a season, and were thus promoted to the Southern League Division One South & West.

In May 2009, they gained promotion to the Southern Football League Premier Division, when they beat AFC Totton 2–1 after extra time in the play-off final. Didcot reached the play-offs after finishing fifth in the league and, in consecutive matches, beating the first- (Truro City), second- (Windsor and Eton) and third-placed (AFC Totton) teams, all away from home. The 2010–11 season saw long-term manager Stuart Peace leave the club in January, to be replaced by Ady Williams; however, he could not save them from relegation.

Williams resigned in May 2011 to be replaced by Francis Vines, but he only stayed until September 2011, after a poor start to the season. He was replaced with Dave Mudge, who guided the club to the first round of the FA Trophy for the first time, but resigned at the start of the 2012–13 season for personal reasons to be replaced by Gary Elkins.

Elkins was replaced by former Didcot FA Vase winners Ian Concannon and Jamie Heapy, who were appointed as joint managers in November 2013 .

The football club gained nationwide attention when it reached the FA Cup first round proper in season 2015–16 and was awarded a home tie with Exeter City, which was shown live on BT Sport. At the end of the 2018–19 season, Didcot reappointed Jamie Heapy as their first team manager after Andy Ballard resigned.

The 2022–23 season saw Didcot Town promoted back to the Premier Division having defeated Ware in the play-off final.

== Stadium ==
Didcot have played at Loop Meadow on the town's Ladygrove estate after the sale of their former Station Road ground in 1999. The ground boasts a main pitch and a training pitch, with the main pitch having a 150-seat main stand and a covered standing area. Their previous ground is now the site of a large car park for the town's recently built shopping centre. Loop Meadow attracted its biggest crowd of 2,707 in 2015 when League Two side Exeter City visited in the FA Cup first round.

The ground has been upgraded to meet FA Ground Specifications. Two 175 standing terraces have been erected to the Railway End and 100 seats have been added into the Main Stand.

== Players ==
=== First-team squad ===
Note: Flags indicate national team as defined under FIFA eligibility rules; some limited exceptions apply. Players may hold more than one non-FIFA nationality.

No.	Pos.	Nation	Player
1	GK	ENG	Leigh Bedwell
5	DF	ENG	Adam Learoyd
6	DF	ENG	Luke Carnell
7	FW	ENG	Cameron Mills
10	MF	CMR	JP. Nyuysemo
11	FW	ENG	Tyger-J Hall

== Honours ==
=== League honours ===
- Hellenic Football League Premier Division
  - Winners (2): 1953–54, 2005–06
  - Runners-up (1): 2004–05
- Hellenic Football League Division One
  - Winners (1): 1976–77
- Reading & District league Division One
  - Winners (1): 1935–36

=== Cup honours ===
- FA Vase:
  - Winners (1): 2004–05
- Berks & Bucks FA Senior Trophy:
  - Winners (3): 2001–02, 2002–03, 2005–06
- Hellenic Football League Challenge Cup:
  - Winners (7): 1965–66, 1966–67, 1991–92, 1997–98, 2003–04, 2004–05, 2005–06
  - Runners-up (1): 1953–54
- Hellenic Football League Supplementary Cup:
  - Winners (2): 1976–77, 2002–03
- Hellenic Football League Division one Challenge Cup:
  - Winners (2): 1976–77, 1986–87
- Metropolitan League Cup:
  - Runners-up (1): 1961–62
- Hungerford Cup:
  - Winners (1): 1997–98
- Reading Mercury Cup:
  - Winners (1): 1978–79
- Didcot Festival Cup:
  - Winners (1): 1957–58
- Dale Robers Memorial Cup:
  - Winners (1): 2016–17

== Records ==
- Highest League Position: 15th in Southern League Premier Division 2009–10
- FA Cup best performance: First round 2015–16
- FA Trophy best performance: Second round 2026–27
- FA Vase best performance: Winners 2004–05
- Highest Attendance for Competitive match: (FA Cup): 2,707 vs Exeter City 8 November 2015
- Highest Attendance for Competitive Cup match (FA Cup): 2,707 vs Exeter City 8 November 2015

== Former coaches ==
1. Managers/Coaches that have played/managed in the football league or any foreign equivalent to this level (i.e. fully professional league).
2. Managers/Coaches with full international caps.
- (Republic of Ireland) Peter Foley
- (Wales) Ady Williams
