= 2019–20 Hellenic Football League =

The 2019–20 Hellenic Football League season was the 67th in the history of the Hellenic Football League, a football competition in England.

The allocations for Steps 1 to 6 for season 2019–20 were announced by the FA on 19 May 2019. These were subject to appeal, and the Hellenic's constitution was ratified at the league's AGM in June.

As a result of the COVID-19 pandemic, this season's competition was formally abandoned on 26 March 2020, with all results from the season being expunged, and no promotion or relegation taking place to, from, or within the competition. On 30 March 2020, sixty-six non-league clubs sent an open letter to the Football Association requesting that they reconsider their decision.

== Premier Division ==
Hellenic Football League Premier Division
- Season: 2019–20
- Matches: 236
- Goals: 864 (3.66 per match)

The Premier Division featured 16 clubs which competed in the division last season, along with three new clubs:

- Burnham, promoted from Division One East
- Easington Sports, promoted from Division One West
- Westfields, transferred from the Midland League

Chipping Sodbury Town were initially transferred from the Western League to the Hellenic League, however this was reversed on appeal on 11 June.

=== League table ===
Pos	Team	Pld	W	D	L	GF	GA	GD	Pts	
1	Westfields	26	20	6	0	81	24	+57	66	
2	Binfield	22	17	2	3	55	23	+32	53	
3	Fairford Town	23	16	1	6	57	37	+20	49	
4	Shrivenham	27	13	4	10	53	52	+1	43	
5	Brackley Town Saints	27	12	2	13	49	46	+3	38	Resigned from the league
6	Longlevens	25	11	4	10	52	41	+11	37	
7	Burnham	27	12	1	14	42	42	0	37	
8	Easington Sports	23	11	3	9	35	35	0	36	
9	Flackwell Heath	24	9	6	9	41	40	+1	33	
10	Reading City	26	9	6	11	32	35	−3	33	
11	Windsor	26	9	5	12	53	55	−2	32	
12	Lydney Town	25	9	5	11	29	35	−6	32	
13	Bishop's Cleeve	21	9	4	8	48	32	+16	31	
14	Virginia Water	26	8	5	13	42	48	−6	29	
15	Tuffley Rovers	21	7	7	7	47	50	−3	28	
16	Royal Wootton Bassett Town	27	8	4	15	50	65	−15	28	
17	Brimscombe & Thrupp	24	6	9	9	36	49	−13	27	
18	Ardley United	26	5	8	13	38	68	−30	23	
19	Holmer Green	26	2	4	20	24	87	−63	10	

Updated to match(es) played on 10 March 2020. Source: FA Full-Time
Rules for classification: 1) Points; 2) Goal difference; 3) Number of goals scored; 4) Number of matches won; 5) Head-to-head results

=== Results table ===
Home \ Away	ARD	BIN	BIS	BRA	BRI	BUR	EAS	FAI	FLA	REC	HOL	LON	LYD	RWB	SHR	TUF	VIR	WES	WIN
Ardley United	—		2–1	1–1												3–3	3–1		
Binfield	4–2	—								1–1							2–0	2–3	2–0
Bishop's Cleeve			—	4–0		2–1						4–1			6–1	4–0			
Brackley Town Saints				—							7–0	0–2							
Brimscombe & Thrupp		0–1	0–1	1–4	—			0–1										3–3	
Burnham		0–2			1–1	—	0–1	0–3									4–1		
Easington Sports				0–1			—					0–3							
Fairford Town							1–2	—			4–1	3–2							
Flackwell Heath							5–1		—	3–1	2–0		1–2						3–2
Reading City						1–0	1–5			—			2–1		3–1				
Holmer Green											—	0–2		3–3			2–1		
Longlevens										0–2		—	2–3	1–3		3–2			
Lydney Town			1–1	1–0				1–3			2–0		—				0–0		
Royal Wootton Bassett Town										2–2				—	2–3		1–3	1–6	2–4
Shrivenham	2–2							5–1							—	2–3	4–3		
Tuffley Rovers		4–1			3–3			1–3								—			3–3
Virginia Water							3–1			0–4						2–2	—		3–3
Westfields	5–1			2–1	6–0							4–1	0–0					—	5–0
Windsor	2–3										5–1		3–0		4–2				—

Updated to match(es) played on unknown. Source:
Legend: Blue = home team win; Yellow = draw; Red = away team win.

== Division One East ==
Hellenic Football League Division One East
- Season: 2019–20
- Matches: 199
- Goals: 802 (4.03 per match)

Division One East featured eleven clubs which competed in the division last season, along with six new clubs:

- Abingdon United, relegated from the Premier Division
- Kidlington development, transferred from Division One West
- Langley, promoted from Division Two East
- Long Crendon, promoted from Division Two East
- Marlow United, promoted from the Thames Valley Premier League
- Risborough Rangers, transferred from the Spartan South Midlands League

=== League table ===
Pos	Team	Pld	W	D	L	GF	GA	GD	Pts	
1	Risborough Rangers	23	20	3	0	67	12	+55	63	
2	Abingdon United	24	14	7	3	67	27	+40	49	
3	Holyport	23	14	6	3	71	34	+37	48	
4	Wokingham & Emmbrook	22	13	3	6	47	18	+29	42	
5	Chalvey Sports	28	12	4	12	53	51	+2	40	
6	Milton United	25	12	3	10	63	55	+8	39	
7	Long Crendon	23	12	2	9	47	35	+12	38	
8	Didcot Town reserves	27	10	5	12	45	58	−13	35	Resigned from the league
9	Kidlington development	24	10	4	10	56	46	+10	34	
10	Wallingford Town	25	9	7	9	38	34	+4	34	
11	Penn & Tylers Green	21	9	3	9	56	35	+21	30	
12	Marlow United	22	9	3	10	45	40	+5	30	Resigned from the league
13	Thame Rangers	24	6	8	10	37	48	−11	26	
14	AFC Aldermaston	19	5	8	6	34	37	−3	23	
15	Woodley United	25	3	4	18	31	78	−47	13	
16	Langley	23	3	2	18	30	94	−64	11	
17	Abingdon Town	20	2	0	18	15	100	−85	6	

Updated to match(es) played on 10 March 2020. Source: FA Full-Time
Rules for classification: 1) Points; 2) Goal difference; 3) Number of goals scored; 4) Number of matches won; 5) Head-to-head results

=== Results table ===
Home \ Away	ABT	ABU	ALD	CHA	DID	HOL	KID	LAN	LON	MAR	MIL	PTG	RIS	THA	WAL	WOK	WOO
Abingdon Town	—	1–5		1–8							1–9						
Abingdon United		—	2–2														2–1
AFC Aldermaston	2–1		—	3–1													1–1
Chalvey Sports				—		3–3									1–0		
Didcot Town					—			4–2	2–0								3–0
Holyport			2–1			—											
Kidlington						2–2	—			3–1				3–4			
Langley								—									
Long Crendon									—				0–1			2–1	
Marlow United					3–1					—			1–1				
Milton United					1–3	2–4					—		0–6		1–0		
Penn & Tylers Green												—					
Risborough Rangers	2–1				3–1		4–1	2–0					—				
Thame Rangers			2–2	1–0					1–2	0–2	2–3			—			
Wallingford Town			1–1				1–1	2–1	1–2						—		
Wokingham & Emmbrook			2–0	1–2							5–1					—	
Woodley United	1–2									4–3							—

Updated to match(es) played on unknown. Source:
Legend: Blue = home team win; Yellow = draw; Red = away team win.

== Division One West ==
Hellenic Football League Division One West
- Season: 2019–20
- Matches: 132
- Goals: 611 (4.63 per match)

Division One West featured eight clubs which competed in the division last season, along with eight new clubs.

- Clubs, transferred from the West Midlands (Regional) League:
  - Hereford Lads Club
  - Malvern Town
  - Pegasus Juniors, changed its name to Hereford Pegasus
  - Wellington
- Clubs, promoted from Division Two West:
  - Bourton Rovers
  - Moreton Rangers
- Plus:
  - Shortwood United, relegated from the Western League Premier Division
  - Stonehouse Town, promoted from the Gloucestershire County Football League

=== League table ===
Pos	Team	Pld	W	D	L	GF	GA	GD	Pts	
1	Malvern Town	22	17	2	3	107	32	+75	53	
2	Hereford Pegasus	24	16	4	4	79	39	+40	52	
3	Hereford Lads Club	21	13	6	2	76	28	+48	45	
4	Shortwood United	23	11	6	6	59	31	+28	39	
5	Cheltenham Saracens	18	13	0	5	53	32	+21	39	
6	Malmesbury Victoria	21	12	2	7	57	31	+26	38	
7	Thornbury Town	16	12	0	4	55	29	+26	36	
8	Wellington	21	11	3	7	53	33	+20	36	
9	Clanfield	18	10	4	4	42	32	+10	34	
10	Moreton Rangers	22	9	3	10	42	46	−4	30	
11	Stonehouse Town	18	7	1	10	33	36	−3	22	
12	Cirencester Town development	24	5	4	15	35	68	−33	19	
13	Tytherington Rocks	24	4	3	17	28	76	−48	15	
14	Bourton Rovers	23	3	2	18	27	74	−47	11	
15	Newent Town	19	2	3	14	25	62	−37	9	
16	New College Swindon	20	0	1	19	9	131	−122	1	Resigned from the league

Updated to match(es) played on 10 March 2020. Source: FA Full-Time
Rules for classification: 1) Points; 2) Goal difference; 3) Number of goals scored; 4) Number of matches won; 5) Head-to-head results

=== Results table ===
Home \ Away	BOU	CHE	CIR	CLA	HLC	PEG	MSB	MLT	MOR	NCS	NEW	SHO	STO	THO	TYT	WEL
Bourton Rovers	—			2–1				0–6								
Cheltenham Saracens		—					2–0								4–1	
Cirencester Town	1–1		—	3–3		0–5										2–3
Clanfield				—						4–0			3–1		2–1	
Hereford Lads Club					—											
Hereford Pegasus	6–1	6–2		2–0		—									3–1	
Malmesbury Victoria	3–1						—			13–0	3–1	2–1				
Malvern Town								—								
Moreton Rangers	2–0								—	8–1				1–3		
New College Swindon										—					1–1	0–9
Newent Town						1–3		1–7	1–3		—	1–1	0–5			
Shortwood United								3–1		14–1		—	2–1			
Stonehouse Town						1–7	0–1				2–1		—			
Thornbury Town				3–2				3–5		8–1				—		
Tytherington Rocks							4–2	1–4	1–1						—	
Wellington	1–0		1–1						2–1		1–1	1–3				—

Updated to match(es) played on unknown. Source:
Legend: Blue = home team win; Yellow = draw; Red = away team win.

== Division Two North ==
Hellenic Football League Division Two North
- Season: 2019–20

Division Two North featured 14 new clubs:

- Adderbury Park, transferred from Division Two West
- Headington Amateurs, transferred from Division Two West
- Woodstock Town, transferred from Division Two West
- Risborough Rangers reserves, transferred from Division Two East
- Old Bradwell United development, transferred from Division Two East
- Chinnor, relegated from Division One East
- Milton United development
- Banbury United development
- Buckingham Athletic development
- Easington Sports development
- Heyford Athletic, joined from the Oxfordshire Senior League
- Long Crendon reserves, joined from the Oxfordshire Senior League
- Moreton Rangers reserves
- Southam United

=== League table ===
Pos	Team	Pld	W	D	L	GF	GA	GD	Pts	Qualification
1	Southam United	17	16	0	1	71	17	+54	48	
2	Adderbury Park	15	10	3	2	35	16	+19	33	
3	Headington Amateurs	18	9	4	5	44	29	+15	31	
4	Woodstock Town	16	9	4	3	39	27	+12	31	Transferred to Division Two South
5	Heyford Athletic	12	6	3	3	40	12	+28	21	
6	Easington Sports development	11	6	1	4	20	15	+5	19	
7	Buckingham Athletic development	12	4	3	5	20	23	−3	15	
8	Banbury United development	15	4	1	10	28	47	−19	13	
9	Chinnor	12	3	1	8	17	31	−14	10	Transferred to Division Two East
10	Moreton Rangers reserves	10	2	3	5	7	18	−11	9	Transferred to Division Two West
11	Long Crendon reserves	13	2	2	9	16	45	−29	8	
12	Old Bradwell United development	12	2	1	9	12	35	−23	7	
13	Risborough Rangers reserves	13	1	2	10	10	44	−34	5	
14	Milton United development	0	0	0	0	0	0	0	0	Withdrew, record expunged

Source: Fa Full-Time
Rules for classification: 1) points; 2) goal difference; 3) number of goals scored.

== Division Two South ==
Hellenic Football League Division Two South
- Season: 2019–20

Division Two South featured 14 new clubs:

- Abingdon United development, transferred from Division Two West
- Penn & Tylers Green reserves, transferred from Division Two East
- Yateley United, transferred from Division Two East
- Stokenchurch, transferred from Division Two East
- Virginia Water reserves, transferred from Division Two East
- Chalfont Wasps, transferred from Division Two East
- Chalvey Sports reserves, transferred from Division Two East
- Taplow United, transferred from Division Two East
- Wallingford Town reserves, transferred from Division Two East
- Aston Clinton development, transferred from Division Two East
- Wokingham & Emmbrook reserves, joined from the Thames Valley Premier Football League
- Hazlemere Sports
- AFC Aldermaston reserves
- Langley development

=== League table ===
Pos	Team	Pld	W	D	L	GF	GA	GD	Pts	Qualification
1	Penn & Tylers Green reserves	13	13	0	0	59	10	+49	39	Transferred to Division Two East
2	Yateley United	16	11	2	3	39	29	+10	35	Transferred to Division Two East
3	Wokingham & Emmbrook reserves	15	10	2	3	50	20	+30	32	Transferred to Division Two East
4	Hazlemere Sports	16	7	4	5	34	29	+5	25	Transferred to Division Two East
5	Aston Clinton development	13	7	2	4	32	28	+4	23	Transferred to Division Two North
6	Wallingford Town reserves	16	7	2	7	42	51	−9	23	
7	Chalvey Sports reserves	16	6	0	10	29	41	−12	18	Transferred to Division Two East
8	Chalfont Wasps	14	4	1	9	23	37	−14	13	Transferred to Division Two East
9	AFC Aldermaston reserves	13	4	0	9	20	33	−13	12	
10	Taplow United	15	3	3	9	19	46	−27	12	Transferred to Division Two East
11	Stokenchurch	13	3	2	8	27	37	−10	11	Transferred to Division Two East
12	Virginia Water reserves	12	3	1	8	19	28	−9	10	Resigned from the league
13	Abingdon United development	0	0	0	0	0	0	0	0	Withdrew, record expunged
14	Langley development	0	0	0	0	0	0	0	0	Withdrew, record expunged

Source: Fa Full-Time
Rules for classification: 1) points; 2) goal difference; 3) number of goals scored.

== Division Two West ==
Hellenic Football League Division Two West
- Season: 2019–20

Division Two West featured 7 clubs which competed in the division last season, along with 6 new clubs:

- Chippenham Town development
- Fairford Town reserves
- Kintbury Rangers reserves
- Letcombe, joined from the North Berks League
- Shortwood United development
- Swindon Robins

=== League table ===
Pos	Team	Pld	W	D	L	GF	GA	GD	Pts	Qualification
1	Letcombe	13	10	1	2	33	18	+15	31	Transferred to Division Two South
2	Highworth Town reserves	12	9	1	2	54	15	+39	28	Transferred to Division Two South
3	Faringdon Town	14	8	3	3	32	16	+16	27	Transferred to Division Two South
4	Shrivenham reserves	13	8	0	5	46	29	+17	24	Transferred to Division Two South
5	Fairford Town reserves	14	7	1	6	32	31	+1	22	
6	Wantage Town development	13	6	3	4	33	21	+12	21	Transferred to Division Two South
7	Newent Town reserves	11	6	1	4	26	22	+4	19	
8	Kintbury Rangers reserves	14	5	2	7	30	27	+3	17	Resigned from the league
9	Swindon Robins	15	4	2	9	24	44	−20	14	Resigned from the league
10	Clanfield reserves	14	0	5	9	20	51	−31	5	Transferred to Division Two South
11	Shortwood United development	15	1	1	13	21	77	−56	4	Resigned from the league
12	Brimscombe & Thrupp reserves	0	0	0	0	0	0	0	0	Withdrew, record expunged
13	Chippenham Town development	0	0	0	0	0	0	0	0	Withdrew, record expunged

Source: Fa Full-Time
Rules for classification: 1) points; 2) goal difference; 3) number of goals scored.
