= 2018–19 Hellenic Football League =

The 2018–19 Hellenic Football League season was the 66th in the history of the Hellenic Football League, a football competition in England.

The provisional club allocations for steps 5 and 6 were announced by the FA on 25 May 2018. The constitution was ratified by the league at its AGM on 8 July.

== Premier Division ==
Hellenic Football League Premier Division
- Season: 2018–19
- Champions: Wantage Town
- Promoted: Wantage Town
- Relegated: Abingdon United
- Matches: 342
- Goals: 1,144 (3.35 per match)

The Premier Division featured 14 clubs which competed in the division last season, along with five new clubs:

- Ardley United, promoted from Division One West
- Bishop's Cleeve, relegated from the Southern League
- Holmer Green, transferred from the Spartan South Midlands League
- Shrivenham, promoted from Division One West
- Virginia Water, promoted from Division One East

Also, Highmoor Ibis was renamed Reading City.

=== League table ===
Pos	Team	Pld	W	D	L	GF	GA	GD	Pts	Promotion or relegation
1	Wantage Town	36	22	7	7	81	42	+39	73	Promoted to the Southern League
2	Brimscombe & Thrupp	36	22	5	9	74	47	+27	71	
3	Brackley Town Saints	36	22	4	10	71	47	+24	70	
4	Bishop's Cleeve	36	20	9	7	80	47	+33	69	
5	Shrivenham	36	19	4	13	66	62	+4	61	
6	Windsor	36	18	6	12	67	46	+21	60	
7	Ascot United	36	15	12	9	72	49	+23	57	Transferred to the Combined Counties League
8	Flackwell Heath	36	14	10	12	49	48	+1	52	
9	Binfield	36	14	8	14	59	62	−3	50	
10	Royal Wootton Bassett Town	36	14	7	15	66	71	−5	49	
11	Lydney Town	36	14	6	16	56	69	−13	48	
12	Holmer Green	36	14	6	16	47	65	−18	48	
13	Fairford Town	36	13	4	19	52	66	−14	43	
14	Virginia Water	36	10	12	14	50	52	−2	42	
15	Tuffley Rovers	36	9	10	17	57	68	−11	37	
16	Longlevens	36	11	4	21	52	64	−12	37	
17	Ardley United	36	10	7	19	59	77	−18	37	
18	Reading City	36	10	1	25	50	82	−32	31	
19	Abingdon United	36	8	4	24	36	80	−44	28	Relegated to Division One East

Source: FA Full-Time
Rules for classification: 1) Points; 2) Goal difference; 3) Number of goals scored; 4) Number of matches won; 5) Head-to-head results

== Division One East ==
Hellenic Football League Division One East
- Season: 2018–19
- Champions: Burnham
- Promoted: Burnham
- Relegated: Chinnor
- Matches: 156
- Goals: 636 (4.08 per match)

Division One East featured ten clubs which competed in the division last season, along with four new clubs:

- Abingdon Town, promoted from Division Two East
- Burnham, relegated from the Premier Division
- Chalvey Sports, promoted from Division Two East
- Woodley United, relegated from the Premier Division

=== League table ===
Pos	Team	Pld	W	D	L	GF	GA	GD	Pts	Promotion or relegation
1	Burnham	24	17	3	4	85	29	+56	54	Promoted to the Premier Division
2	Thame Rangers	24	14	8	2	51	35	+16	50	
3	AFC Aldermaston	24	14	3	7	63	39	+24	45	
4	Holyport	24	13	5	6	53	22	+31	44	
5	Didcot Town reserves	24	13	2	9	47	33	+14	41	
6	Wokingham & Emmbrook	24	11	4	9	44	46	−2	37	
7	Wallingford Town	24	10	5	9	47	49	−2	35	
8	Chalvey Sports	24	10	4	10	56	44	+12	34	
9	Penn & Tylers Green	24	10	1	13	46	52	−6	31	
10	Milton United	24	8	5	11	38	37	+1	29	
11	Woodley United	24	5	5	14	44	66	−22	20	
12	Abingdon Town	24	5	2	17	37	112	−75	17	
13	Chinnor	24	2	1	21	25	72	−47	7	Relegated to Division Two North
14	Bicester Town	0	0	0	0	0	0	0	0 (Note: Bicester Town resigned from the league after playing, and losing, three games. All results expunged.)	Resigned from the league, record expunged

Source: FA Full-Time
Rules for classification: 1) Points; 2) Goal difference; 3) Number of goals scored; 4) Number of matches won; 5) Head-to-head results

== Division One West ==
Hellenic Football League Division One West
- Season: 2018–19
- Champions: Easington Sports
- Promoted: Easington Sports
- Matches: 132
- Goals: 611 (4.63 per match)

Division One West featured nine clubs which competed in the division last season, along with five new clubs:

- Almondsbury, transferred from the Western League
- Carterton, promoted from Division Two West
- Malmesbury Victoria, transferred from the Western League
- Newent Town, promoted from Division Two West
- Thornbury Town, promoted from the Gloucestershire County League

=== League table ===
Pos	Team	Pld	W	D	L	GF	GA	GD	Pts	Promotion or relegation
1	Easington Sports	22	17	1	4	61	13	+48	52	Promoted to the Premier Division
2	Cheltenham Saracens	22	16	1	5	78	26	+52	49	
3	Thornbury Town	22	15	3	4	65	23	+42	48	
4	Malmesbury Victoria	22	15	1	6	83	25	+58	46	
5	Clanfield	22	13	4	5	50	26	+24	43	
6	Kidlington development	22	12	3	7	72	35	+37	39	Transferred to Division One East
7	Almondsbury	22	11	4	7	58	30	+28	37	Transferred to the Western League
8	Cirencester Town development	22	7	1	14	50	54	−4	22	
9	Newent Town	22	6	4	12	32	56	−24	22	
10	Pewsey Vale	22	5	4	13	37	62	−25	19	Transferred to the Wessex League
11	Tytherington Rocks	22	1	0	21	15	109	−94	3	
12	New College Swindon	22	1	0	21	10	152	−142	3	
13	Carterton	0	0	0	0	0	0	0	0 (Note: Carterton resigned from the league after playing three games. All results expunged.)	Resigned from the league, record expunged
14	North Leigh United	0	0	0	0	0	0	0	0 (Note: North Leigh United resigned from the league in January after playing eleven games. All results expunged.)	Resigned from the league, record expunged

Source: FA Full-Time
Rules for classification: 1) Points; 2) Goal difference; 3) Number of goals scored; 4) Number of matches won; 5) Head-to-head results

== Division Two East ==
Hellenic Football League Division Two East
- Season: 2018–19
- Champions: Long Crendon
- Promoted: Long Crendon; Langley

Division Two East featured 6 clubs which competed in the division last season, along with 9 new clubs:

- Chalfont Wasps, demoted from Division One East
- Chalvey Sports reserves
- Langley
- Old Bradwell United development
- Risborough Rangers reserves
- Taplow United
- Thatcham Town development
- Wallingford Town reserves
- Yateley United

=== League table ===
Pos	Team	Pld	W	D	L	GF	GA	GD	Pts	Qualification
1	Long Crendon	28	25	2	1	118	18	+100	77	Promoted to Division One East
2	Langley	28	24	2	2	106	18	+88	74	Promoted to Division One East
3	Penn & Tylers Green reserves	28	24	2	2	96	27	+69	74	Transferred to Division Two South
4	Thatcham Town development	28	14	5	9	59	45	+14	47	Resigned from the league
5	Yateley United	28	13	4	11	61	46	+15	43	Transferred to Division Two South
6	Stokenchurch	28	13	4	11	51	66	−15	43	Transferred to Division Two South
7	Virginia Water reserves	28	10	8	10	52	46	+6	38	Transferred to Division Two South
8	Risborough Rangers reserves	28	9	7	12	42	56	−14	34	Transferred to Division Two North
9	Chalfont Wasps	28	8	5	15	37	62	−25	29	Transferred to Division Two South
10	Chalvey Sports reserves	28	8	2	18	31	89	−58	26	Transferred to Division Two South
11	Taplow United	28	6	6	16	42	88	−46	24	Transferred to Division Two South
12	Chinnor reserves	28	7	3	18	34	81	−47	24	Resigned from the league
13	Wallingford Town reserves	28	5	8	15	38	67	−29	23	Transferred to Division Two South
14	Aston Clinton development	28	6	4	18	50	72	−22	22	Transferred to Division Two South
15	Old Bradwell United development	28	5	4	19	34	70	−36	19	Transferred to Division Two North

Source: fchd
Rules for classification: 1) points; 2) goal difference; 3) number of goals scored.

== Division Two West ==
Hellenic Football League Division Two West
- Season: 2018–19
- Champions: Moreton Rangers
- Promoted: Moreton Rangers; Bourton Rovers

Division Two West featured 7 clubs which competed in the division last season, along with 8 new clubs:

- Abingdon Town reserves
- Abingdon United development, transferred from Division Two East
- Adderbury Park, joined from the Oxfordshire Senior League
- Carterton development
- Headington Amateurs, demoted from Division One West
- Newent Town reserves
- Wantage Town development
- Woodstock Town, demoted from Division One West

=== League table ===
Pos	Team	Pld	W	D	L	GF	GA	GD	Pts	Qualification
1	Moreton Rangers	24	19	1	4	89	23	+66	58	Promoted to Division One West
2	Wantage Town development	24	17	3	4	80	36	+44	54	
3	Abingdon United development	24	17	2	5	68	27	+41	53	Transferred to Division Two South
4	Adderbury Park	24	14	3	7	71	35	+36	45	Transferred to Division Two North
5	Bourton Rovers	24	14	3	7	64	33	+31	45	Promoted to Division One West
6	Highworth Town reserves	24	14	3	7	62	45	+17	45	
7	Headington Amateurs	24	13	4	7	53	35	+18	43	Transferred to Division Two North
8	Clanfield reserves	24	6	6	12	37	60	−23	24	
9	Brimscombe & Thrupp reserves	24	6	4	14	44	75	−31	22	
10	Shrivenham reserves	24	6	3	15	38	58	−20	21	
11	Faringdon Town	24	5	2	17	38	74	−36	17	
12	Newent Town reserves	24	3	4	17	33	93	−60	13	
13	Woodstock Town	24	2	2	20	32	115	−83	8	Transferred to Division Two North
14	Abingdon Town reserves	0	0	0	0	0	0	0	0	Withdrew, record expunged
15	Carterton development	0	0	0	0	0	0	0	0	Withdrew, record expunged

Source: fchd
Rules for classification: 1) points; 2) goal difference; 3) number of goals scored.
