= 2017–18 Hellenic Football League =

The 2017–18 Hellenic Football League season was the 65th in the history of the Hellenic Football League, a football competition in England.

The constitution for Step 5 and Step 6 divisions for 2017–18 was announced on 26 May 2017. Following some adjustments, the constitution for the Hellenic League was ratified at the league's AGM on 2 July.

== Premier Division ==
Hellenic Football League Premier Division
- Season: 2017–18
- Champions: Thatcham Town
- Promoted: Thatcham Town; Bracknell Town; Highworth Town
- Relegated: Woodley United; Burnham
- Matches: 380
- Goals: 1,419 (3.73 per match)

Premier Division featured 15 clubs which competed in the division last season, along with five new clubs:

- Abingdon United, promoted from Division One West
- Fairford Town, promoted from Division One West
- Wantage Town, relegated from the Southern League
- Windsor, transferred from the Combined Counties League
- Woodley United, promoted from Division One East

=== League table ===
Pos	Team	Pld	W	D	L	GF	GA	GD	Pts	Promotion or relegation
1	Thatcham Town	38	31	5	2	129	25	+104	98	Promoted to the Southern League Division One South
2	Bracknell Town	38	32	2	4	129	27	+102	98	Promoted to the Isthmian League South Central Division
3	Highworth Town	38	28	4	6	113	50	+63	88	Promoted to the Southern League Division One South
4	Wantage Town	38	27	5	6	90	40	+50	86	
5	Flackwell Heath	38	22	8	8	88	55	+33	74	
6	Brimscombe & Thrupp	38	22	4	12	74	57	+17	70	
7	Binfield	38	19	7	12	82	76	+6	64	
8	Windsor	38	15	7	16	75	74	+1	52	
9	Longlevens	38	14	8	16	63	77	−14	50	
10	Tuffley Rovers	38	14	7	17	50	72	−22	49	
11	Oxford City Nomads	38	14	2	22	73	83	−10	44	Club folded
12	Brackley Town Saints	38	12	7	19	71	63	+8	43	
13	Abingdon United	38	11	10	17	62	77	−15	43	
14	Ascot United	38	12	4	22	54	82	−28	40	
15	Royal Wootton Bassett Town	38	11	6	21	44	85	−41	39	
16	Lydney Town	38	9	6	23	45	87	−42	33	
17	Highmoor Ibis	38	7	8	23	52	100	−48	29	
18	Fairford Town	38	6	10	22	59	98	−39	28	
19	Woodley United	38	6	8	24	32	80	−48	26	Relegated to Division One East
20	Burnham	38	6	6	26	34	111	−77	21 (Note: Burnham were deducted three points on 2 December for a fielding an ineligible player in a match.)	Relegated to Division One East

Source: FA Full-Time
Rules for classification: 1) Points; 2) Goal difference; 3) Number of goals scored; 4) Number of matches won; 5) Head-to-head results

== Division One East ==
Hellenic Football League Division One East
- Season: 2017–18
- Champions: Virginia Water
- Promoted: Virginia Water
- Matches: 156
- Goals: 601 (3.85 per match)

Division One East featured nine clubs which competed in the division last season, along with five new clubs:

- Henley Town, relegated from the Premier Division
- Milton United, transferred from Division One West
- Thame Rangers, promoted from Spartan South Midlands League Division Two
- Virginia Water, promoted from the Surrey Elite Intermediate League
- Wallingford Town, promoted from the North Berks League

=== League table ===
Pos	Team	Pld	W	D	L	GF	GA	GD	Pts	Promotion or relegation
1	Virginia Water	24	18	4	2	65	26	+39	58	Promoted to the Premier Division
2	Bicester Town	24	17	3	4	61	31	+30	54	
3	Penn & Tylers Green	24	15	3	6	59	34	+25	48	
4	Sandhurst Town	24	14	3	7	66	37	+29	45	Transferred to the Combined Counties League
5	Holyport	24	13	3	8	61	46	+15	42	
6	Wokingham & Emmbrook	24	13	2	9	61	38	+23	41	
7	Wallingford Town	24	10	6	8	39	38	+1	36	
8	Thame Rangers	24	9	2	13	43	69	−26	29	
9	Chalfont Wasps	24	6	3	15	30	54	−24	21	Demoted to Division Two East
10	Didcot Town reserves	24	3	11	10	36	42	−6	20	
11	AFC Aldermaston	24	5	5	14	32	63	−31	20	
12	Chinnor	24	5	4	15	26	57	−31	19	
13	Milton United	24	2	3	19	22	66	−44	9	
14	Henley Town	0	0	0	0	0	0	0	0	Resigned from the league, record expunged (Note: Henley Town resigned from the league, having played thirteen matches, and as a result their playing record (PL:13, W:1, D:0, L:12, GF:3, GA:57) was expunged.)

Source: FA Full-Time
Rules for classification: 1) Points; 2) Goal difference; 3) Number of goals scored; 4) Number of matches won; 5) Head-to-head results

== Division One West ==
Hellenic Football League Division One West
- Season: 2017–18
- Champions: Ardley United
- Promoted: Ardley United; Shrivenham
- Matches: 182
- Goals: 796 (4.37 per match)

Division One West featured eleven clubs which competed in the division last season, along with four new clubs:

- Ardley United, demoted from the Premier Division
- Headington Amateurs, transferred from Division One East
- Kidlington reserves, promoted from Division Two West
- Pewsey Vale, transferred from the Wessex League

=== League table ===
Pos	Team	Pld	W	D	L	GF	GA	GD	Pts	Promotion or relegation
1	Ardley United	26	19	2	5	102	33	+69	59	Promoted to the Premier Division
2	Shrivenham	26	17	3	6	74	38	+36	54	Promoted to the Premier Division
3	Easington Sports	26	16	3	7	77	36	+41	51	
4	Pewsey Vale	26	15	4	7	71	38	+33	49	
5	Cirencester Town development	26	14	4	8	64	41	+23	46	
6	North Leigh United	26	13	5	8	48	31	+17	44	
7	Letcombe	26	13	4	9	60	54	+6	43	Demoted to North Berks League
8	Clanfield	26	12	4	10	62	38	+24	40	
9	Headington Amateurs	26	13	1	12	55	44	+11	40	Demoted to Division Two West
10	Cheltenham Saracens	26	10	5	11	51	60	−9	32 (Note: Cheltenham Saracens were deducted three points on 2 December for a fielding an illegible player in a match.)	
11	Kidlington reserves	26	8	6	12	47	45	+2	30	
12	Woodstock Town	26	6	4	16	41	83	−42	22	Demoted to Division Two West
13	New College Swindon	26	3	1	22	26	104	−78	10	
14	Tytherington Rocks	26	0	0	26	18	151	−133	0	
15	Shortwood United reserves	0	0	0	0	0	0	0	0	Resigned from the league, record expunged (Note: Shortwood United Reserves left the league at the end of March having played 20 matches. All results expunged.)

Source: FA Full-Time
Rules for classification: 1) Points; 2) Goal difference; 3) Number of goals scored; 4) Number of matches won; 5) Head-to-head results

== Division Two East ==
Hellenic Football League Division Two East
- Season: 2017–18
- Champions: Chalvey Sports
- Promoted: Chalvey Sports; Abingdon Town

Division Two East featured 5 clubs which competed in the division last season, along with 7 new clubs:

- Abingdon Town
- Abingdon United development, transferred from Division Two West and changed name form Abingdon United reserves
- Chinnor reserves, from Oxfordshire Senior League
- London Rangers
- Long Crendon
- Thame Rangers development
- Virginia Water reserves

=== League table ===
Pos	Team	Pld	W	D	L	GF	GA	GD	Pts	Qualification
1	Chalvey Sports	22	17	4	1	89	14	+75	55	Promoted to Division One East
2	Abingdon United development	22	17	2	3	75	26	+49	53	Transferred to Division Two West
3	Long Crendon	22	13	4	5	57	26	+31	43	
4	Virginia Water reserves	22	10	3	9	52	45	+7	33	
5	Penn & Tylers Green reserves	22	10	3	9	42	35	+7	33	
6	Aston Clinton development	22	10	2	10	35	53	−18	32	
7	Abingdon Town	22	9	3	10	55	65	−10	30	Promoted to Division One East
8	Stokenchurch	22	7	5	10	49	51	−2	26	
9	Thame Rangers Development	22	7	2	13	35	58	−23	23	Resigned from the league
10	Chalfont Wasps reserves	22	5	5	12	37	48	−11	20	Resigned from the league
11	Chinnor reserves	22	5	5	12	31	51	−20	20	
12	London Rangers	22	3	0	19	39	124	−85	9	Resigned from the league

Source: fchd
Rules for classification: 1) points; 2) goal difference; 3) number of goals scored.

== Division Two West ==
Hellenic Football League Division Two West
- Season: 2017–18
- Champions: Newent Town
- Promoted: Newent Town; Carterton

Division Two West featured 7 clubs which competed in the division last season, along with 5 new clubs:

- Bishop's Cleeve development
- Carterton, dropped from Premier Division
- Cheltenham Saracens reserves
- Clanfield reserves, rejoined the League
- Newent Town, joined from the Gloucestershire Northern Senior League

=== League table ===
Pos	Team	Pld	W	D	L	GF	GA	GD	Pts	Qualification
1	Newent Town	20	14	4	2	72	21	+51	46	Promoted to Division One West
2	Bourton Rovers	20	13	4	3	78	22	+56	43	
3	Moreton Rangers	20	11	8	1	58	19	+39	41	
4	Carterton	20	12	3	5	66	36	+30	39	Promoted to Division One West
5	Bishop's Cleeve development	20	11	3	6	54	34	+20	36	Resigned from the league
6	Brimscombe & Thrupp reserves	20	8	3	9	46	42	+4	27	
7	Highworth Town reserves	20	7	3	10	41	54	−13	24	
8	Faringdon Town	20	5	5	10	28	35	−7	20	
9	Clanfield reserves	20	6	2	12	18	46	−28	20	
10	Shrivenham reserves	20	3	3	14	21	63	−42	12	
11	Cheltenham Saracens reserves	20	0	2	18	9	119	−110	2	Resigned from the league
12	Easington Sports reserves	0	0	0	0	0	0	0	0	Withdrew, record expunged

Source: fchd
Rules for classification: 1) points; 2) goal difference; 3) number of goals scored.
