= 2016–17 Hellenic Football League =

The 2016–17 Hellenic Football League season was the 64th in the history of the Hellenic Football League, a football competition in England.

== Premier Division ==
Hellenic Football League Premier Division
- Season: 2016–17
- Champions: Thame United
- Promoted: Thame United
- Relegated: Henley Town
- Matches: 306
- Goals: 1,252 (4.09 per match)

Premier Division featured 16 clubs which competed in the division last season, along with three new clubs:

- Burnham, relegated from the Southern Football League
- Carterton, promoted from Division One West
- Henley Town, promoted from Division One East

=== League table ===
Pos	Team	Pld	W	D	L	GF	GA	GD	Pts	Promotion or relegation
1	Thame United	34	26	6	2	118	39	+79	84	Promoted to the Southern Football League
2	Bracknell Town	34	26	3	5	113	37	+76	81	
3	Flackwell Heath	34	23	4	7	94	41	+53	73	
4	Thatcham Town	34	21	5	8	90	48	+42	68	
5	Ardley United	34	20	4	10	75	53	+22	64	Voluntarily demoted to Division One West
6	Highworth Town	34	19	4	11	87	59	+28	61	
7	Brimscombe & Thrupp	34	18	4	12	80	58	+22	58	
8	Binfield	34	16	4	14	65	49	+16	52	
9	Lydney Town	34	15	6	13	65	64	+1	51	
10	Tuffley Rovers	34	15	5	14	61	57	+4	50	
11	Royal Wootton Bassett Town	34	15	3	16	61	64	−3	45 (Note: Royal Wootton Bassett Town were deducted three points for fielding an ineligible player in their win over Longlevens on 10 September.)	
12	Longlevens	34	11	3	20	67	83	−16	36	
13	Brackley Town Saints	34	10	4	20	48	97	−49	34	
14	Highmoor Ibis	34	8	8	18	52	82	−30	32	
15	Ascot United	34	8	4	22	49	80	−31	28	
16	Oxford City Nomads	34	6	6	22	45	87	−42	24	
17	Burnham	34	6	1	27	42	129	−87	19	
18	Henley Town	34	4	4	26	40	125	−85	16	Relegated to Division One East
19	Carterton	0	0	0	0	0	0	0	0	Resigned to Division Two West, record expunged (Note: Carterton resigned from the league, having played three matches, and as a result their playing record (PL:3, W:1, L:2, GF:3, GA:9) was expunged.)

Source: fchd
Rules for classification: 1) Points; 2) Goal difference; 3) Number of goals scored; 4) Number of matches won; 5) Head-to-head results

==== Promotion criteria ====
To be promoted at the end of the season a team must:

1. Have applied to be considered for promotion by the end of November
2. Pass a ground grading examination by the end of March
3. Finish the season in a position higher than that of any other team also achieving criteria 1 and 2
4. Finish the season in one of the top three positions

The following four teams have achieved criterion one:

- Bracknell Town
- Flackwell Heath
- Thame United
- Thatcham Town

== Division One East ==
Hellenic Football League Division One East
- Season: 2016–17
- Champions: Penn & Tylers Green
- Promoted: Woodley United
- Matches: 182
- Goals: 715 (3.93 per match)

Division One East featured eleven clubs which competed in the division last season, along with three new clubs:

- AFC Aldermaston, promoted from the Thames Valley Premier League
- Sandhurst Town, transferred from the Combined Counties League
- Wokingham & Emmbrook, relegated from the Premier Division

=== League table ===
Pos	Team	Pld	W	D	L	GF	GA	GD	Pts	Promotion or relegation
1	Penn & Tylers Green	26	20	3	3	87	22	+65	63	Ineligible for promotion
2	Woodley United	26	20	3	3	55	17	+38	63	Promoted to the Premier Division
3	Headington Amateurs	26	17	4	5	85	38	+47	55	Transferred to Division One West
4	Finchampstead	26	14	1	11	58	38	+20	43	Voluntarily relegated to the Thames Valley Premier League
5	Bicester Town	26	12	4	10	60	40	+20	40	
6	Chalfont Wasps	26	11	7	8	42	38	+4	40	
7	AFC Aldermaston	26	12	1	13	54	46	+8	37	
8	Sandhurst Town	26	10	7	9	38	41	−3	37	
9	Didcot Town reserves	26	10	4	12	53	52	+1	34	
10	Chinnor	26	9	4	13	40	58	−18	31	
11	Rayners Lane	26	9	3	14	35	52	−17	30	Transferred to the Spartan South Midlands League
12	Wokingham & Emmbrook	26	7	7	12	48	53	−5	28	
13	Holyport	26	6	2	18	45	66	−21	20	
14	Wantage Town reserves	26	0	0	26	15	154	−139	0	Resigned from the league

Source: fchd
Rules for classification: 1) Points; 2) Goal difference; 3) Number of goals scored; 4) Number of matches won; 5) Head-to-head results

== Division One West ==
Hellenic Football League Division One West
- Season: 2016–17
- Champions: Fairford Town
- Promoted: Abingdon United; Fairford Town
- Matches: 240
- Goals: 931 (3.88 per match)

Division One West featured 13 clubs which competed in the division last season, along with three new clubs:

- Abingdon United, relegated from the Premier Division
- Milton United, relegated from the Premier Division
- Woodstock Town, transferred from Division One East, with a change of name from Old Woodstock Town

=== League table ===
Pos	Team	Pld	W	D	L	GF	GA	GD	Pts	Promotion
1	Fairford Town	30	24	3	3	131	26	+105	75	Promoted to the Premier Division
2	Abingdon United	30	21	1	8	83	30	+53	64	Promoted to the Premier Division
3	Hook Norton	30	20	3	7	80	44	+36	63	Club folded
4	Easington Sports	30	17	5	8	57	37	+20	56	
5	Cirencester Town development	30	16	4	10	76	51	+25	52	
6	Purton	30	15	6	9	71	52	+19	51	Resigned from the league
7	Shrivenham	30	13	5	12	49	41	+8	44	
8	North Leigh United	30	14	5	11	64	67	−3	44 (Note: North Leigh were deducted three points for an infringement in the game against Tytherington Rocks on 31 December 2016.)	
9	Shortwood United reserves	30	11	9	10	51	44	+7	42	
10	Clanfield	30	11	6	13	46	44	+2	39	
11	Letcombe	30	11	4	15	44	54	−10	37	
12	Milton United	30	9	5	16	53	63	−10	32	Transferred to Division One East
13	New College Swindon	30	9	2	19	43	72	−29	29	
14	Cheltenham Saracens	30	7	5	18	34	139	−105	26	
15	Tytherington Rocks	30	3	5	22	25	68	−43	14	
16	Woodstock Town	30	3	4	23	24	99	−75	13	

Source: fchd
Rules for classification: 1) Points; 2) Goal difference; 3) Number of goals scored; 4) Number of matches won; 5) Head-to-head results

== Division Two East ==
Hellenic Football League Division Two East
- Season: 2016–17
- Champions: Chalvey Sports

Division Two East featured 7 clubs which competed in the division last season, along with 7 new clubs:

- Aston Clinton development
- Chalfont Wasps reserves
- Chalvey Sports
- Henley Town reserves
- Lynch Pin
- Milton Keynes Academy
- Oxford City development

=== League table ===
Pos	Team	Pld	W	D	L	GF	GA	GD	Pts	Qualification
1	Chalvey Sports	22	19	2	1	77	13	+64	59	
2	Flackwell Heath reserves	22	16	1	5	77	34	+43	49	Resigned from the league
3	Oxford City development	22	13	4	5	69	38	+31	43	Resigned from the league
4	Milton Keynes Academy	22	12	4	6	69	38	+31	40	Resigned from the league
5	Lynch Pin	22	12	3	7	60	54	+6	39	Resigned from the league
6	Penn & Tylers Green reserves	22	9	4	9	45	36	+9	28 (Note: Penn & Tylers Green reserves were deducted 3 points.)	
7	Chalfont Wasps reserves	22	8	4	10	37	55	−18	28	
8	Sandhurst Town reserves	22	8	2	12	45	57	−12	26	Resigned from the league
9	Stokenchurch	22	7	2	13	44	83	−39	23	
10	Thame United reserves	22	6	2	14	31	45	−14	20	Resigned from the league
11	Wokingham & Emmbrook reserves	22	3	2	17	23	69	−46	11	Resigned from the league
12	Aston Clinton development	22	3	2	17	22	77	−55	11	
13	Henley Town reserves	0	0	0	0	0	0	0	0	Withdrew, records expunged
14	Holyport reserves	0	0	0	0	0	0	0	0	Withdrew, records expunged

Source: fchd
Rules for classification: 1) points; 2) goal difference; 3) number of goals scored.

== Division Two West ==
Hellenic Football League Division Two West
- Season: 2016–17
- Champions: Bourton Rovers
- Promoted: Kidlington reserves

Division Two West featured 9 clubs which competed in the division last season, along with 5 new clubs:

- Abingdon United reserves
- Bourton Rovers, joined from the Witney and District League
- Easington Sports reserves
- Faringdon Town, joined from the North Berks Football League
- Shrivenham reserves, rejoined the League

=== League table ===
Pos	Team	Pld	W	D	L	GF	GA	GD	Pts	Qualification
1	Bourton Rovers	22	16	1	5	72	29	+43	49	
2	Kidlington reserves	22	15	2	5	63	27	+36	47	Promoted to Division One West
3	Highworth Town reserves	22	15	1	6	48	28	+20	46	
4	Abingdon United reserves	22	14	1	7	59	28	+31	43	Transferred to Division Two East
5	Moreton Rangers	22	13	2	7	53	28	+25	41	
6	Oxford City Nomads development	22	10	1	11	68	61	+7	31	Resigned from the league
7	Fairford Town reserves	22	9	3	10	41	39	+2	30	Resigned from the league
8	Faringdon Town	22	7	3	12	34	65	−31	24	
9	Brimscombe & Thrupp reserves	22	5	8	9	47	47	0	23	
10	Easington Sports reserves	22	6	4	12	29	59	−30	22	
11	Hook Norton reserves	22	5	1	16	21	70	−49	16	Resigned from the league
12	Shrivenham reserves	22	2	3	17	23	77	−54	9	
13	Clanfield reserves	0	0	0	0	0	0	0	0	Withdrew, record expunged
14	Purton reserves	0	0	0	0	0	0	0	0	Withdrew, record expunged

Source: fchd
Rules for classification: 1) points; 2) goal difference; 3) number of goals scored.
