= 2020–21 Hellenic Football League =

The 2020–21 Hellenic Football League season was the 68th in the history of the Hellenic Football League, a football competition in England. The league operates a number of divisions, three of which were in the English football league system, the Premier Division at Step 5 and the two regionally split Divisions One, East and West, at Step 6.

The allocations for Steps 5 and 6 for season 2020–21 were announced by the FA on 21 July, and were subject to appeal.

The 2020–21 season started in September and was suspended in December a result of the COVID-19 pandemic. The league season was subsequently abandoned on 24 February 2021.

== Promotions and restructuring ==
The scheduled restructuring of non-League football took place at the end of the season, with new divisions added to the Combined Counties and the United Counties Leagues at Step 5 for 2021–22, along with an additional division in the Northern Premier League at Step 4. Promotions from Steps 5 to 4 and 6 to 5 were based on points per game across all matches over the two cancelled seasons (2019–20 and 2020–21), while teams were promoted to Step 6 on the basis of a subjective application process. Consequently, the East and West divisions merged into one group for the next season.

== Premier Division ==
Hellenic Football League Premier Division
- Season: 2020–21
- Promoted: Binfield
- Matches: 69
- Goals: 213 (3.09 per match)

The Premier Division comprised 18 teams, one less than the previous season, following the resignation of Brackley Town Saints.

=== League table ===
Pos	Team	Pld	W	D	L	GF	GA	GD	Pts	Promotion or qualification
1	Flackwell Heath	7	6	0	1	16	4	+12	18	Transferred to the Spartan South Midlands League
2	Binfield	7	5	2	0	18	7	+11	17	Promoted to the Isthmian League South Central Division (Note: Promoted based on points per game calculations from 2019–20 and 2020–21 seasons combined.)
3	Reading City	9	5	2	2	15	10	+5	17	Transferred to the Combined Counties League
4	Bishop's Cleeve	8	5	0	3	15	8	+7	15	
5	Brimscombe & Thrupp	6	4	2	0	18	5	+13	14	
6	Fairford Town	9	4	1	4	17	13	+4	13	
7	Holmer Green	8	4	1	3	14	11	+3	13	Transferred to the Spartan South Midlands League
8	Longlevens	7	3	3	1	12	9	+3	12	
9	Easington Sports	7	4	0	3	12	11	+1	12	Transferred to the United Counties League
10	Virginia Water	8	3	2	3	10	10	0	11	Transferred to the Combined Counties League
11	Burnham	7	2	3	2	8	11	−3	9	Transferred to the Combined Counties League
12	Windsor	9	2	2	5	17	19	−2	8	Transferred to the Combined Counties League
13	Lydney Town	7	2	2	3	9	14	−5	8	
14	Westfields	5	2	1	2	5	5	0	7	
15	Royal Wootton Bassett Town	8	1	4	3	8	12	−4	7	
16	Tuffley Rovers	7	2	0	5	7	16	−9	6	
17	Ardley United	10	1	1	8	8	20	−12	4	Transferred to the Spartan South Midlands League
18	Shrivenham	9	1	0	8	4	28	−24	3	

Source: FA Full-Time
Rules for classification: 1) Points; 2) Goal difference; 3) Number of goals scored; 4) Number of matches won; 5) Head-to-head results

== Division One East ==
Hellenic Football League Division One East
- Season: 2020–21
- Matches: 58
- Goals: 219 (3.78 per match)

Division One East comprised 15 teams, two less than the previous season, following the resignations of Didcot Town reserves and Marlow United.

=== League table ===
Pos	Team	Pld	W	D	L	GF	GA	GD	Pts	Promotion or qualification
1	Wokingham & Emmbrook	8	6	2	0	22	2	+20	20	Promoted to the Combined Counties League (Note: Promoted based on points per game calculations from 2019–20 and 2020–21 seasons combined.)
2	Holyport	9	5	2	2	17	12	+5	17	Promoted to the Combined Counties League
3	Wallingford Town	10	5	2	3	15	13	+2	17	Transferred to the Combined Counties League
4	Risborough Rangers	6	6	0	0	24	2	+22	18	Promoted to the Spartan South Midlands League
5	Milton United	7	4	1	2	19	13	+6	13	
6	Long Crendon	6	4	1	1	12	7	+5	13	Transferred to the Spartan South Midlands League
7	Kidlington development	8	3	3	2	19	15	+4	12	Transferred to the Spartan South Midlands League
8	Penn & Tylers Green	5	3	1	1	12	7	+5	10	Transferred to the Spartan South Midlands League
9	AFC Aldermaston	7	3	1	3	11	14	−3	10	Transferred to the Combined Counties League
10	Abingdon United	9	3	1	5	13	17	−4	10	
11	Langley	8	2	2	4	15	26	−11	8	Transferred to the Combined Counties League
12	Chalvey Sports	8	2	1	5	11	19	−8	7	Transferred to the Combined Counties League
13	Abingdon Town	8	1	1	6	9	18	−9	4	Resigned from the league
14	Woodley United	6	1	0	5	8	22	−14	3	Transferred to the Combined Counties League
15	Thame Rangers	11	1	0	10	12	32	−20	3	Transferred to the Combined Counties League

Source: FA Full-Time
Rules for classification: 1) Points; 2) Goal difference; 3) Number of goals scored; 4) Number of matches won; 5) Head-to-head results

== Division One West ==
Hellenic Football League Division One West
- Season: 2020–21
- Matches: 67
- Goals: 254 (3.79 per match)

Division One West comprised 15 teams, one less than the previous season, following the resignation of New College Swindon.

=== League table ===
Pos	Team	Pld	W	D	L	GF	GA	GD	Pts	Promotion or qualification
1	Malvern Town	11	10	0	1	38	14	+24	30	Promoted to the Premier Division (Note: Promoted based on points per game calculations from 2019–20 and 2020–21 seasons combined.)
2	Thornbury Town	9	5	3	1	19	9	+10	18	Promoted to the Premier Division
3	Newent Town	9	5	2	2	20	15	+5	17	
4	Hereford Lads Club	9	5	1	3	26	10	+16	16	Promoted to the Premier Division
5	Malmesbury Victoria	10	4	4	2	20	10	+10	16	
6	Hereford Pegasus	10	5	1	4	16	17	−1	16	
7	Clanfield	8	4	3	1	13	7	+6	15	
8	Cheltenham Saracens	7	3	2	2	17	13	+4	11	
9	Bourton Rovers	7	3	1	3	14	17	−3	10	
10	Wellington	9	3	0	6	17	19	−2	9	Resigned to the Herefordshire County FA League
11	Stonehouse Town	8	3	0	5	9	18	−9	9	
12	Shortwood United	8	2	2	4	8	13	−5	8	
13	Moreton Rangers	12	1	4	7	14	30	−16	7	
14	Tytherington Rocks	9	2	0	7	14	23	−9	6	Transferred to the Western League
15	Cirencester Town development	8	0	1	7	9	39	−30	1	

Source: FA Full-Time
Rules for classification: 1) Points; 2) Goal difference; 3) Number of goals scored; 4) Number of matches won; 5) Head-to-head results

== Division Two East ==
Hellenic Football League Division Two East
- Season: 2020–21

Division Two East featured 15 new clubs:

- Penn & Tylers Green reserves, transferred from Division Two South
- Yateley United, transferred from Division Two South
- Wokingham & Emmbrook reserves, transferred from Division Two South
- Hazlemere Sports, transferred from Division Two South
- Chalvey Sports reserves, transferred from Division Two South
- Chalfont Wasps, transferred from Division Two South
- Taplow United, transferred from Division Two South
- Stokenchurch, transferred from Division Two South
- Chinnor, transferred from Division Two North
- Cove Under 23
- FC Beaconsfield
- Flackwell Heath reserves
- Holmer Green development
- Watlington Town, joined from the North Berks League
- Westfield reserves

=== League table ===
Pos	Team	Pld	W	D	L	GF	GA	GD	Pts	Qualification
1	Flackwell Heath reserves	6	4	1	1	21	10	+11	13	Resigned from the league
2	Holmer Green development	5	4	0	1	19	11	+8	12	
3	Wokingham & Emmbrook reserves	4	3	1	0	12	1	+11	10	Resigned from the league
4	Watlington Town	5	3	1	1	16	12	+4	10	
5	Westfield reserves	4	3	0	1	13	11	+2	9	Resigned from the league
6	Chalfont Wasps	4	2	1	1	6	9	−3	7	
7	Yateley United	2	2	0	0	10	4	+6	6	Resigned to the Thames Valley Premier Football League
8	FC Beaconsfield	5	1	3	1	11	11	0	6	
9	Chalvey Sports reserves	4	1	1	2	11	12	−1	4	
10	Chinnor	6	1	1	4	17	22	−5	4	Transferred to Division Two North
11	Hazlemere Sports	3	1	0	2	3	6	−3	3	
12	Penn & Tylers Green reserves	4	0	1	3	8	14	−6	1	
13	Taplow United	2	0	0	2	3	7	−4	0	
14	Stokenchurch	3	0	0	3	3	12	−9	0	
15	Cove Under 23	3	0	0	3	4	15	−11	0	Resigned from the league

Source: Fa Full-Time
Rules for classification: 1) points; 2) goal difference; 3) number of goals scored.

== Division Two North ==
Hellenic Football League Division Two North
- Season: 2020–21

Division Two North featured 10 clubs which competed in the division last season, along with 4 new clubs:

- Ardley United development
- Aston Clinton reserves, transferred from Division Two South
- Kidlington development
- Thame United reserves

=== League table ===
Pos	Team	Pld	W	D	L	GF	GA	GD	Pts	Qualification
1	Heyford Athletic	4	4	0	0	14	1	+13	12	
2	Thame United reserves	6	3	2	1	8	4	+4	11	
3	Aston Clinton reserves	6	3	1	2	12	11	+1	10	Transferred to Division Two East
4	Buckingham Athletic development	4	3	0	1	11	8	+3	9	
5	Headington Amateurs	5	2	2	1	12	9	+3	8	
6	Southam United	3	2	1	0	9	7	+2	7	Resigned to the Oxfordshire Senior League
7	Ardley United development	4	2	0	2	10	9	+1	6	Resigned from the league
8	Easington Sports development	4	1	2	1	11	6	+5	5	
9	Adderbury Park	3	1	1	1	6	6	0	4	
10	Long Crendon reserves	5	1	1	3	6	14	−8	4	
11	Risborough Rangers reserves	3	0	2	1	5	6	−1	2	Transferred to Spartan South Midlands League Division Two
12	Banbury United development	2	0	1	1	2	4	−2	1	
13	Old Bradwell United development	3	0	1	2	3	6	−3	1	
14	Kidlington development	6	0	0	6	3	21	−18	0	

Source: Fa Full-Time
Rules for classification: 1) points; 2) goal difference; 3) number of goals scored.

== Division Two South ==
Hellenic Football League Division Two South
- Season: 2020–21

Division Two South featured 2 clubs which competed in the division last season, along with 12 new clubs:

- Abingdon United development, rejoined the League
- Clanfield reserves, transferred from Division Two West
- Faringdon Town, transferred from Division Two West
- Highworth Town reserves, transferred from Division Two West
- Letcombe, transferred from Division Two West
- Shrivenham reserves, transferred from Division Two West
- Wantage Town development, transferred from Division Two West
- Woodstock Town, transferred from Division Two North
- Hungerford Town Swifts
- Kintbury Rangers
- Swindon Supermarine development
- Woodcote & Stoke Rows, joined from the Thames Valley Premier Football League

=== League table ===
Pos	Team	Pld	W	D	L	GF	GA	GD	Pts	Qualification
1	Hungerford Town Swifts	6	6	0	0	24	4	+20	18	
2	Highworth Town reserves	5	3	1	1	15	3	+12	10	
3	Kintbury Rangers	3	3	0	0	14	4	+10	9	
4	Swindon Supermarine development	5	3	0	2	7	9	−2	9	
5	Letcombe	5	2	2	1	13	3	+10	8	
6	Shrivenham reserves	6	2	0	4	10	15	−5	6	
7	Clanfield reserves	6	1	2	3	12	16	−4	5	
8	Wantage Town development	2	1	1	0	4	3	+1	4	
9	Woodcote & Stoke Rows	4	1	1	2	10	21	−11	4	Transferred to Division Two East
10	Abingdon United development	4	1	0	3	2	8	−6	3	Transferred to Division Two North
11	Wallingford Town reserves	5	1	0	4	9	16	−7	3	Resigned from the league
12	AFC Aldermaston reserves	3	1	0	2	2	10	−8	3	Transferred to Division Two East
13	Woodstock Town	4	1	0	3	4	13	−9	3	Transferred to Division Two North
14	Faringdon Town	2	0	1	1	2	3	−1	1	

Source: Fa Full-Time
Rules for classification: 1) points; 2) goal difference; 3) number of goals scored.

== Division Two West ==
Hellenic Football League Division Two West
- Season: 2020–21

Division Two West featured 2 clubs which competed in the division last season, along with 12 new clubs:

- Moreton Rangers reserves, transferred from Division Two North
- Bourton Rovers reserves
- Cricklade Town reserves
- Evesham United development
- Hartpury University
- Kington Town
- Malvern Town development
- SC Inkberrow
- Shipston Excelsior, transferred from Midland League
- Shortwood United reserves
- Slimbridge reserves
- Tuffley Rovers development

=== League table ===
Pos	Team	Pld	W	D	L	GF	GA	GD	Pts	Qualification
1	Slimbridge reserves	6	5	0	1	20	5	+15	15	
2	Kington Town	6	4	0	2	17	12	+5	12	
3	Malvern Town development	4	3	1	0	13	6	+7	10	
4	Hartpury University	5	3	1	1	16	13	+3	10	Transferred to the Herefordshire County FA League
5	Shipston Excelsior	3	3	0	0	8	3	+5	9	Resigned from the league
6	Tuffley Rovers development	6	2	2	2	23	20	+3	8	
7	SC Inkberrow	3	2	0	1	17	4	+13	6	
8	Shortwood United reserves	6	2	0	4	17	17	0	6	
9	Fairford Town reserves	5	2	0	3	10	17	−7	6	Transferred to Division Two South
10	Cricklade Town reserves	5	2	0	3	8	17	−9	6	Resigned from the league
11	Newent Town reserves	6	1	2	3	12	21	−9	5	
12	Moreton Rangers reserves	4	1	1	2	6	11	−5	4	Resigned from the league
13	Evesham United development	5	0	1	4	6	16	−10	1	
14	Bourton Rovers reserves	4	0	0	4	3	14	−11	0	

Source: Fa Full-Time
Rules for classification: 1) points; 2) goal difference; 3) number of goals scored.
