= List of Burnham F.C. seasons =

Burnham Football Club is a non-League football club from Burnham in Buckinghamshire, near Slough. They currently compete in the Southern Football League Premier Division. The team play in blue and white quartered shirts and blue shorts. Home matches are played at The Gore.

== Key ==
Top scorer and number of goals scored shown in bold when he was also top scorer for the division.

Key to league record

- Lvl = Level of the league in the current league system
- S = Numbers of seasons
- Pld = Games played
- W = Games won
- D = Games drawn
- L = Games lost
- GF = Goals for
- GA = Goals against
- GD = Goals difference
- Pts = Points
- Position = Position in the final league table
- Overall position = Overall club position in the English league system

Key to cup records

- Res = Final reached round
- Rec = Final club record in the form of wins-draws-losses
- PR = Premilinary round
- QR1 = Qualifying round 1
- QR2 = Qualifying round 2
- QR3 = Qualifying round 3
- QR4 = Qualifying round 4
- R1 = Round 1
- R2 = Round 2
- R3 = Round 3
- R4 = Round 4
- R5 = Round 5
- R6 = Round 6
- QF = Quarter-finals
- SF = Semi-finals
- RU = Runners-up
- W = Winners
- Average home attendance = for league games only

== Seasons ==
Year	League	Lvl	Pld	W	D	L	GF	GA	GD	Pts	Position	Leading league scorer		FA Cup		FA Trophy		FA Vase		Average home attendance
Year	League	Lvl	Pld	W	D	L	GF	GA	GD	Pts	Position	Name	Goals	Res	Rec	Res	Rec	Res	Rec	Average home attendance
2004–05	Southern Football League; Division One West	8	42	17	7	18	64	64	0	58	**9th of 22**			PR	0-0-1	PR	0-0-1			
2005–06	Southern Football League; Division One West	8	42	16	5	21	58	71	-13	53	**14th of 22**			R1	4-3-1	QR2	1-0-1			
2006–07	Southern Football League; Division One West	8	42	23	4	15	74	60	14	73	**3rd of 22**; Lost in playoff semifinal			PR	0-0-1	QR1	0-0-1			
2007–08	Southern Football League; Division One South & West	8	42	18	9	15	67	55	12	63	**10th of 22**			PR	0-1-1	QR3	2-0-1			
2008–09	Southern Football League; Division One South & West	8	42	12	9	21	52	83	-31	45	**17th of 22**; Transferred			PR	0-1-1	QR2	1-0-1			
2009–10	Southern Football League; Division One South & West	8	42	26	9	7	67	43	24	87	**3rd of 22**; Lost in playoff semifinal			QR2	2-1-1	QR3	3-1-1			
2010–11	Southern Football League; Division One Central	8	42	14	7	21	61	87	-26	49	**14th of 22**			QR2	2-0-1	QR1	1-1-1			
2011–12	Southern Football League; Division One Central	8	42	13	13	16	64	67	-3	52	**15th of 22**			QR3	3-1-1	PR	0-1-1			
2012–13	Southern Football League; Division One Central	8	42	31	6	5	108	39	69	99	**1st of 22**; Promoted			PR	0-0-1	QR2	1-0-1			
2013–14	Southern Football League; Premier Division	7	44	12	8	24	60	91	-31	44	**20th of 23**	Ryan Blake	12	QR2	1-0-1	QR2	1-0-1			134
2014–15	Southern Football League; Premier Division	7	44	5	8	31	41	89	-48	20 (Note: Burnham were docked three points for fielding an ineligible player in a match.)	**23rd of 23**; Relegated	Nicke Kabamba	10	QR2	1-0-1	QR2	1-3-0			132
2015–16	Southern Football League; Division One South & West	8	42	6	6	30	39	99	-60	24	**21st of 22**; Relegated	Tre Mitford	9	PR	0-1-1	PR	0-0-1			79
2016–17	Hellenic Football League; Premier Division	9	34	6	1	27	42	129	-87	19	**17th of 18**	Elliott Amadieu	5	EPR	0-0-1	—	—	QR2	0-0-1	
2017–18	Hellenic Football League; Premier Division	9	38	6	6	26	34	111	−77	21	**21st of 21**; Relegated			EPR	0-0-1	—	—	QR2	0-0-1	
2018–19	Hellenic Football League Division One East	10	24	17	3	4	85	29	56	54	**1st of 13**; Promoted			QR2	3-1-1	—	—	QR2	1-0-1	
2019–20	Hellenic Football League; Premier Division	9	27	12	1	14	42	42	0	37	**7th of 19**			QR1	1-2-1	—	—	QR1	0-0-1	81
2020–21	Hellenic Football League; Premier Division	9	7	2	3	2	8	11	-3	9	**11th of 19**			QR2	2-1-1	—	—	QR1	0-0-1	146
2021–22	Combined Counties Football League Premier Division North	9	34	9	7	18	51	98	-47	34	**13th of 18**			PR	1-2-1	—	—	R1	2-0-1	108
2022–23	Combined Counties Football League Premier Division North	9	38	22	6	10	84	54	30	72	**4th of 20**			EPR	0-1-1	—	—	QR1	0-0-1	127
2023–24	Combined Counties Football League Premier Division North	9	38	17	7	14	92	68	24	58	**6th of 20**			EPR	0-0-1	—	—	R3	3-1-1	72
2024–25	Combined Counties Football League Premier Division North	9	38	18	6	14	77	57	20	60	**6th of 20**	Jabir Laraba	26	EPR	0-1-1	—	—	R3	1-1-1	42
