= 1958–59 Hellenic Football League =

Hellenic Football League

The 1958–59 Hellenic Football League season was the sixth in the history of the Hellenic Football League, a football competition in England.

== Premier Division ==
Hellenic Football League Premier Division
- Season: 1958–59
- Champions: Abingdon Town
- Matches: 240
- Goals: 1,193 (4.97 per match)

The Premier Division featured 14 clubs which competed in the division last season, along with two new clubs:

- Hungerford Town
- Yiewsley reserves

=== League table ===
Pos	Team	Pld	W	D	L	GF	GA	GR	Pts	Promotion or relegation
1	Abingdon Town	30	24	3	3	113	34	3.324	51	
2	Yiewsley reserves	30	19	8	3	77	33	2.333	46	Resigned from the league
3	Witney Town	30	17	5	8	74	56	1.321	39	
4	Bicester Town	30	15	5	10	86	71	1.211	35	
5	Hungerford Town	30	16	2	12	92	78	1.179	34	
6	Bletchley Town	30	13	5	12	73	68	1.074	31	Resigned from the league
7	Stokenchurch	30	11	8	11	80	75	1.067	30	
8	Headington United 'A'	30	12	5	13	94	77	1.221	29	
9	Luton Town Colts	30	12	3	15	71	67	1.060	27	
10	Amersham Town	30	10	7	13	64	72	0.889	27	
11	Wantage Town	30	11	5	14	66	82	0.805	27	
12	Wallingford Town	30	9	8	13	59	66	0.894	26	
13	Newbury Town reserves	30	10	3	17	63	77	0.818	23	
14	Pressed Steel	30	8	5	17	53	94	0.564	21	
15	Chipping Norton Town	30	8	3	19	61	111	0.550	19	
16	Kidlington	30	6	3	21	67	132	0.508	15	

Source: nonleaguematters
Rules for classification: 1) points; 2) goal ratio; 3) number of goals scored.

== Division One ==
Hellenic Football League Division One
- Season: 1958–59
- Champions: Thatcham
- Promoted: Thatcham
- Matches: 156
- Goals: 932 (5.97 per match)

The Division One featured 11 clubs which competed in the division last season, along with 2 new clubs:

- Abingdon United
- Bletchley Town Reserves

=== League table ===
Pos	Team	Pld	W	D	L	GF	GA	GR	Pts	Promotion or relegation
1	Thatcham	24	17	2	5	108	39	2.769	36	Promoted to the Premier Division
2	Hanwell Corinthians	24	16	3	5	99	50	1.980	35	
3	Henley Town	24	16	1	7	86	47	1.830	33	
4	Princes Risborough Town	24	14	3	7	94	61	1.541	31	
5	Hazells	24	14	3	7	86	60	1.433	31	
6	Stanwell District	24	13	5	6	86	63	1.365	31	
7	Abingdon United	24	10	5	9	61	57	1.070	25	
8	R A F Halton	24	10	3	11	57	55	1.036	23	
9	Ruislip Town	24	7	5	12	50	79	0.633	19	
10	Aston Clinton	24	8	1	15	73	96	0.760	17	Resigned from the league
11	Amersham Town Reserves	24	6	5	13	61	109	0.560	17	
12	Pressed Steel Reserves	24	1	5	18	35	103	0.340	7	
13	Bletchley Town Reserves	24	2	3	19	36	113	0.319	7	Resigned from the league

Source: nonleaguematters
Rules for classification: 1) points; 2) goal ratio; 3) number of goals scored.
