= Chalvey Sports F.C. =

Association football club in England

Coordinates: 51.50875°N 0.63821°W

Chalvey Sports
- Full name: Chalvey Sports Football Club
- Nickname: The Stabmonks
- Founded: 1885
- Ground: Eltham Avenue Recreation Ground, Slough
- Chairman: Bradley O'Brien
- Manager: Alex Smith & Lewis Travers
- League: East Berkshire League Premier Division
- 2025–26: East Berkshire League Premier Division, 7th of 10

Chalvey Sports Football Club is a football club based in the Chalvey area of Slough, England. They are currently members of the East Berkshire League Premier Division and play at Eltham Avenue in Slough.

== History ==
The club was founded in 1885. In 1954 they joined Division One of the Great Western Combination, which they won at the first attempt, earning promotion to the Premier Division. They left the league at the end of the 1958–59 season, subsequently playing in the Windsor, Slough & District League. During their time in the league they won the Norfolkian Senior Cup and the Slough Senior Cup.

In 1992 the Windsor, Slough & District League merged into the East Berkshire League, with Chalvey placed in Division One. They were Division One champions in 1992–93 and were promoted to the Premier Division. In 1996–97 they were Premier Division champions. The club won the League Cup in 2012–13. In 2016 they transferred to Division Two East of the Hellenic League. After winning the division in 2016–17 and 2017–18, the club were promoted to Division One East. At the end of the 2020–21 season they were transferred to Division One of the Combined Counties League.

Chalvey finished bottom of Division One in 2021–22 and were relegated to the Premier Division of the Thames Valley Premier League. However, they resigned from the league midway through the following season, before rejoining Division Two East of the Hellenic League for the 2023–24 season. The club switched to the Premier Division of the East Berkshire League prior to the 2024–25 season.

== Ground ==
The club were based at the Garibaldi Pub during the 1980s, before moving to Chalvey Working Men's Club, changing the club name to Chalvey W.M.C. Sports. The club relocated to Arbour Park, the home ground of Slough Town, in 2017. In 2021 they moved to Burnham's 1878 Stadium.

== Honours ==
- Hellenic League
  - Division Two East champions, 2016–17, 2017–18
- East Berkshire League
  - Premier Division champions 1996–97
  - Division One champions 1992–93
  - League Cup winners 1994–95, 2001–02, 2012–13
- Great Western Combination
  - Division One champions 1954–55
- Norfolkian Senior Cup
  - Winners 1964–65, 1971,72, 1998–99
- Slough Town Senior Cup
  - Winners 1956–57
- Ascot & Fielden Cup
  - Winners 2003–04

== Records ==
- Best FA Vase performance: First qualifying round, 2019–20, 2020–21, 2021–22
