= 1959–60 Hellenic Football League =

The 1959–60 Hellenic Football League season was the seventh in the history of the Hellenic Football League, a football competition in England.

== Premier Division ==
Hellenic Football League Premier Division
- Season: 1959–60
- Champions: Abingdon Town
- Relegated: Chipping Norton Town
- Matches: 272
- Goals: 1,320 (4.85 per match)

The Premier Division featured 14 clubs which competed in the division last season, along with three new clubs:

- Swindon Town 'A'
- Thatcham, promoted from Division One
- Thame United

=== League table ===
Pos	Team	Pld	W	D	L	GF	GA	GR	Pts	Promotion or relegation
1	Abingdon Town	32	22	6	4	96	29	3.310	50	
2	Swindon Town 'A'	32	22	2	8	95	44	2.159	46	
3	Bicester Town	32	20	3	9	89	65	1.369	43	
4	Luton Town Colts	32	19	3	10	100	64	1.563	41	Resigned from the league
5	Thatcham	32	18	4	10	92	59	1.559	40	
6	Hungerford Town	32	17	6	9	95	81	1.173	40	
7	Headington United 'A'	32	13	9	10	98	70	1.400	35	
8	Witney Town	32	13	7	12	82	71	1.155	33	
9	Stokenchurch	32	16	1	15	79	78	1.013	33	
10	Thame United	32	14	4	14	84	76	1.105	32	
11	Newbury Town reserves	32	14	4	14	68	78	0.872	32	
12	Wallingford Town	32	13	4	15	64	86	0.744	30	
13	Pressed Steel	32	11	3	18	59	97	0.608	25	
14	Amersham Town	32	9	4	19	60	93	0.645	22	
15	Kidlington	32	9	4	19	64	106	0.604	22	
16	Wantage Town	32	5	3	24	52	120	0.433	13	
17	Chipping Norton Town	32	2	3	27	43	103	0.417	7	Relegated to Division One

Source: nonleaguematters
Rules for classification: 1) points; 2) goal ratio; 3) number of goals scored.

== Division One ==
Hellenic Football League Division One
- Season: 1959–60
- Champions: Hazells
- Promoted: Hazells
- Matches: 132
- Goals: 736 (5.58 per match)

The Division One featured 10 clubs which competed in the division last season, along with 2 new clubs:

- 17th Battalion R A O C
- Botley United

=== League table ===
Pos	Team	Pld	W	D	L	GF	GA	GR	Pts	Promotion or relegation
1	Hazells	22	17	1	4	100	33	3.030	35	Promoted to the Premier Division
2	17th Battalion R A O C	22	15	0	7	64	32	2.000	30	
3	Botley United	22	12	5	5	73	39	1.872	29	
4	Hanwell Corinthians	22	12	3	7	66	44	1.500	27	
5	Henley Town	22	11	4	7	70	58	1.207	26	
6	R A F Halton	22	11	2	9	73	58	1.259	24	
7	Princes Risborough Town	22	11	2	9	56	54	1.037	24	
8	Stanwell District	22	9	5	8	68	52	1.308	23	
9	Abingdon United	22	9	2	11	55	63	0.873	20	
10	Ruislip Town	22	5	1	16	47	89	0.528	11	
11	Amersham Town Reserves	22	3	3	16	37	105	0.352	9	Resigned from the league
12	Pressed Steel Reserves	22	2	2	18	27	109	0.248	6	Resigned from the league

Source: nonleaguematters
Rules for classification: 1) points; 2) goal ratio; 3) number of goals scored.
