= Manny Williams =

Sierra Leonean footballer

Personal information
- Date of birth: 13 November 1980 (age 45)
- Place of birth: Sierra Leone
- Position: Forward

Senior career*
Years	Team	Apps	(Gls)
2004–2005	Leyton	36	(15)
2005–2006	Yeading	25	(8)
2006–2007	Leyton	27	(12)
2007–2008	Maidenhead United	40	(24)
2008–2009	Woking	12	(0)
2008	→ Maidenhead United (loan)	6	(0)
2009	→ Weston-super-Mare (loan)	12	(4)
2009–2011	Havant & Waterlooville	72	(31)
2011–2012	Maidenhead United	32	(6)
2012	Hayes & Yeading United	12	(2)
2012–2016	Basingstoke Town	116	(37)
2016	Hampton & Richmond Borough	5	(0)
2016–2017	Hungerford Town	7	(2)
2017	→ Slough Town (loan)	9	(2)
2017–2020	Slough Town	74	(12)
2019	→ Basingstoke Town (loan)	2	(2)
2019	→ Beaconsfield Town (loan)	1	(0)
2019	→ Harrow Borough (loan)	6	(2)
2020	→ Staines Town (loan)	1	(0)
2020–2022	Burnham	24	(8)
2022	Slough Town	4	(0)
2022–2023	Southall	12	(3)
2023	→ Beaconsfield Town (loan)	1	(0)
2023–2026	Risborough Rangers	45	(6)
Total		581	(176)

International career
2012	Sierra Leone	1	(0)

Managerial career
- 2021–2022: Burnham (player-manager)
- 2023: Egham Town (joint)
- 2026: Northwood
- * Club domestic league appearances and goals

Emmanuel "Manny" Williams (born 13 November 1980) is a Sierra Leonean footballer who was most recently manager of Northwood. He played as a forward. He was capped once by the Sierra Leone national football team.

== Career ==
=== Club career ===
Williams played for Notts County and Millwall early in his career, though he did not make any senior appearances for either side. He then dropped into the Essex Senior Football League, playing for Concord Rangers and Bowers United, before progressing to the Isthmian League with Leyton. In 2005 he moved up to the Conference South with Yeading, but stepped back down a level to return to Leyton the following season.

A year later, he stepped up to the second tier of non-league football again to play for Maidenhead United. After 24 league goals in the 2007–08 season, and 30 goals in all competitions, winning the Players' and Supporters' Player of the Year awards, he joined Conference National side Woking. However, he failed to score in twelve league games, and returned to Maidenhead and then Weston-super-Mare on loan.

Williams joined Havant & Waterlooville in summer 2009. He scored 31 league goals across two seasons before joining Maidenhead for a third time. The following season he joined Hayes & Yeading United, but left for Basingstoke Town in November. He stayed there until the end of the 2015–16 season, scoring 37 goals in 116 league games.

He had brief spells with Hampton & Richmond Borough and Hungerford Town, before joining Slough Town on loan from the latter in January 2017. He joined Slough permanently that summer. He scored 10 league goals for the Rebels that season, and came off the bench to score the winner in the Southern Football League play-off final against Kings Lynn Town.

By now in his late 30s, Williams made a diminishing number of appearances for Slough following promotion to the National League South, and had loan spells with Basingstoke, Beaconsfield Town, Harrow Borough and Staines Town while continuing to remain an important squad player for the Rebels.

=== Coaching career ===
Williams joined Hellenic Football League side Burnham as player-assistant manager for the 2020-21 season. Williams became player-manager in October 2021. He returned to Slough in January 2022 as player-assistant manager after leaving Burnham by mutual consent.

After a spell as joint manager at Egham Town, Williams later played for Risborough Rangers where he served as player-coach under Gary Meakin.

Then in May 2026, Williams was named the new manager of newly relegated Combined Counties Football League side Northwood.

Williams and Northwood parted company on 1 September 2026 after a 4-2 loss at home to Harefield United. The defeat left Northwood with just four points from their opening five league matches.

=== International career ===
Born in Sierra Leone but raised in London, Williams was capped by England Schoolboys as a youngster. He made his only appearance for the Sierra Leone national football team in February 2012, as a substitute against São Tomé and Príncipe in 2013 Africa Cup of Nations qualification.
