= Risborough Rangers F.C. =

Football club in England

Coordinates: 51°43′05″N 0°50′47″W

Risborough Rangers
- Full name: Risborough Rangers Football Club
- Nicknames: Rangers, Borough
- Founded: 1971; 55 years ago
- Ground: The KAMTECH Stadium, Windsor Playing Fields, Horsenden Lane, Princes Risborough
- Capacity: 1,500 (Record attendance 1,562 vs. Showbiz Team 1992)
- Chairman: Alan Baldwin
- Manager: Gary Meakin
- League: Spartan South Midlands League Premier Division
- 2025–26: Spartan South Midlands League Premier Division, 3rd of 20
| Home colours | Away colours |

Risborough Rangers Football Club are a football club based in Princes Risborough, Buckinghamshire, England. They are members of the Spartan South Midlands League Premier Division.

== History ==
=== 1971–1988: The Early Years ===
Risborough Rangers were formed in 1971 as a team of 12-year-olds who wanted to play competitive football and in the 1975–76 season, the previous years Under 16's entered into men's football via the Wycombe & District League. In their second season they won the 3rd Division. However, the team then folded, after which the club provided only boys' football until the Under 16's of 1979–80 also entered the Wycombe & District League. The club then won promotion in successive seasons, gaining promotion to the Ercol Senior League. During this period they also won the Berks & Bucks Junior Cup. At around the same time as entering the Ercol Senior League the club moved to 'Windsors', the former home of the defunct Hellenic League club Princes Risborough Town. Within several years, the club had managed to improve the ground by building a clubhouse/bar and extended the covered standing area.

=== 1989–2013: Joining the non-league system ===
In 1989 Risborough accepted an invitation to join the South Midlands League and were placed in Division One. In the first two seasons the club struggled, finishing second from bottom and had to apply for re-election. However, at the end of season 1992–93, the club gained promotion to the Senior Division under the management of Frank Carter. At the start of the 1997–98 season, with the merger of the Souith Midlands league and the London Spartan League, the club became founder members of the Spartan South Midlands League Senior Division. The club remained in the Senior Division, which was later renamed Division One, until the end of the 2002–03 season, when they finished bottom and were relegated to Division Two.

In 2003–04, former Brackley Town F.C. and Abingdon Town manager Bob Rayner returned to the club from Thame United after chairman Richard Woodward persuaded him to return to the club he had last managed during the mid-1990s. Under his guidance the club steadily rebuilt, using players from the successful Rangers junior ranks. They finished runners-up in Division Two in the 2011–12 season. They were also runners-up in the Anagram Trophy that season, losing to Baldock Town 1–0 in the Final at Letchworth. After getting 'Windsors' ground grading up to the required standard the club were finally promoted to Division One at the end of the 2012–13 season. The club also reached the final of the Spartan South Midlands Football League Division Two Cup, losing to Aston Clinton 2–0 at Chesham United. They finished 14th in their first season in Div 1 and reached the final of the Division One Cup, losing 2–0 to 2nd placed Kings Langley in the final at London Colney.

=== 2014–2022: First appearance's in FA Vase, FA Cup and Step 5 of the non-league pyramid ===
Season 2014–15 saw Rangers finish in 5th place in the Div 1. It was also the club's first appearance in the FA vase where they lost in the preliminary round away at Spelthorne Sports of the Combined Counties Premier League, losing 2–1. Their top scorer during the 2014–15 season was Martin Griggs with 29 league goals, 35 goals in all competitions.

The 2015–16 season was a busy season for Risborough Rangers. They competed in the FA Cup for the first time in their history winning 3–0 at Ampthill Town before going out 3–0 to Southern League side Aylesbury FC at 'Windsors' in front of a crowd of 450. In the FA Vase Rangers travelled to United Counties League side Irchester Utd, winning 4–0, before losing away to Cricklewood Wanderers 1–0 in the next round. Former Thame United, Chalfont St. Peter FC and Risborough Rangers player Jamie Rayner was appointed as joint first team manager alongside Bob Rayner at the start of the season, following a spell as joint assistant manager alongside long serving Nick Young. On a managerial level, Jamie had previously worked as Risborough Rangers Reserve team manager, where he guided them to promotion in his first season, only losing one league game. Rangers finished 7th in SSML Division One with top scorer Martin Griggs topping the division's goal-scoring chart with 35 goals from 33 matches. Risborough finished the season winning the Berks & Bucks FA Intermediate Cup beating Olney Town 2–1 AET in the final at Newport Pagnell Town. At the end of the 2015–16 season Bob Rayner retired from football management having managed Rangers for 15 seasons in total, handing over the reins to son Jamie and his assistant Nick Young.

Jamie Rayner's first season in sole charge, the 2016–17 season, saw Rangers finish in sixth place in the Spartan South Midland League Division 1, ensuring qualification for the following years FA Cup Competition. They went out in the first round of the FA Vase to Broadfields United however. Their defence of Berks & Bucks Intermediate Cup ended in the semi-final against Woodley United on penalties following a 1–1 draw. Their top scorer for the season was Lamar Mason-Williams with thirty goals. At the end of the 2017–2018 season Rangers finished eighth in the table. Again they failed to progress in the FA Vase. In the FA Cup they went out following a penalty shoot-out after a replay with higher division opponents Cockfosters. Rangers reached the final of the Spartan South Midland League Challenge Trophy beating four teams from the division above them en route, before losing in the final to Broadfields United. Their top scorer for the season was Martin Griggs with 38 goals.

In October 2018 then current manager Jamie Rayner decided to step down from his position because of work commitments. The Club advertised the position and after a healthy response, the Board appointed the former Aylesbury United, Aylesbury FC, Hemel Hempstead, Arlesey Town & Leighton Town boss Mark Eaton as their new manager. A remarkable turnaround in results ended with a 7th-place finish in the League after being 2nd from bottom when Eaton took charge. There was more success for Rangers with a 2–0 win over London Lions in the Spartan South Midlands Division One Cup Final, goals from Sam Pekun and Ben Cullen sealed the win at Leverstock Green's Pancake Lane.

Because of the ongoing re-construction of the non-league system the club made a lateral movement to the Hellenic League Division One East from the Spartan for the start of the 2019–20 season. The 2019–20 season saw Rangers unbeaten and top the league by 12 points with a game in hand over 2nd place Abingdon United after playing 23 games out of the full 32. The COVID pandemic put an end to any hopes of promotion to step 5 for the first time in the clubs history as the season was officially voided. However, in 2021 the club were promoted to the Premier Division of the Spartan South Midlands League based on their results in the abandoned 2019–20 and 2020–21 seasons.

=== 2023–2025: A Major Period of Transition ===
For the 2023–24 season, Risborough were moved laterally to the Combined Counties Football League Premier Division North. This had quite an effect on the squad due to the geographical change with a few big names departing. Midway through the season, manager Mark Eaton stepped aside from first team management to become the clubs Director of Football. After over 5 years, 214 competitive matches, which consisted of 135 wins, 36 draws and 43 loses he arguably leaves as Rangers most successful manager. Former Wycombe Wanderers legend Mark West who previously managed at Thame United took over from mid February 2024. At the end of the 2023/34 season Mark West left the club after guiding the team to a mid-table finish. Step in Mark Jones formerly of Oxford City, Hemel Hempstead Town and Banbury United. After a complete overhaul of squad personnel with 1 player still in the squad at December 2024 who was in the squad the same time 12 months previous, and a run of poor results, the club parted ways with Mark Jones. Kevin Christou, previously of Tring Athletic, Oxhey Jets, Royston and FC Romania came in on 21 December 2024 to attempt to put an end to Risborough's poor form. Unfortunately, the run of poor results continued and Risborough finished 18th out of 20, avoiding relegation by a single goal on goal difference. At the end of the season, Kevin Christou left the club.

This marked the end of 2 dark seasons for Risborough Rangers, going through 4 managers and heartbreakingly losing to death both vice chairman and stalwart Colyn "Nibbo" Makepeace along with long term chairman Richard Woodward, whose leadership was instrumental in the club’s progress, overseeing key developments of the stadium, and played a key role in shaping the club’s success on the pitch, appointing managers who shared his ambition and leading to the club’s recent rise to Step 5 football for the first time in the clubs history.

== Ground ==
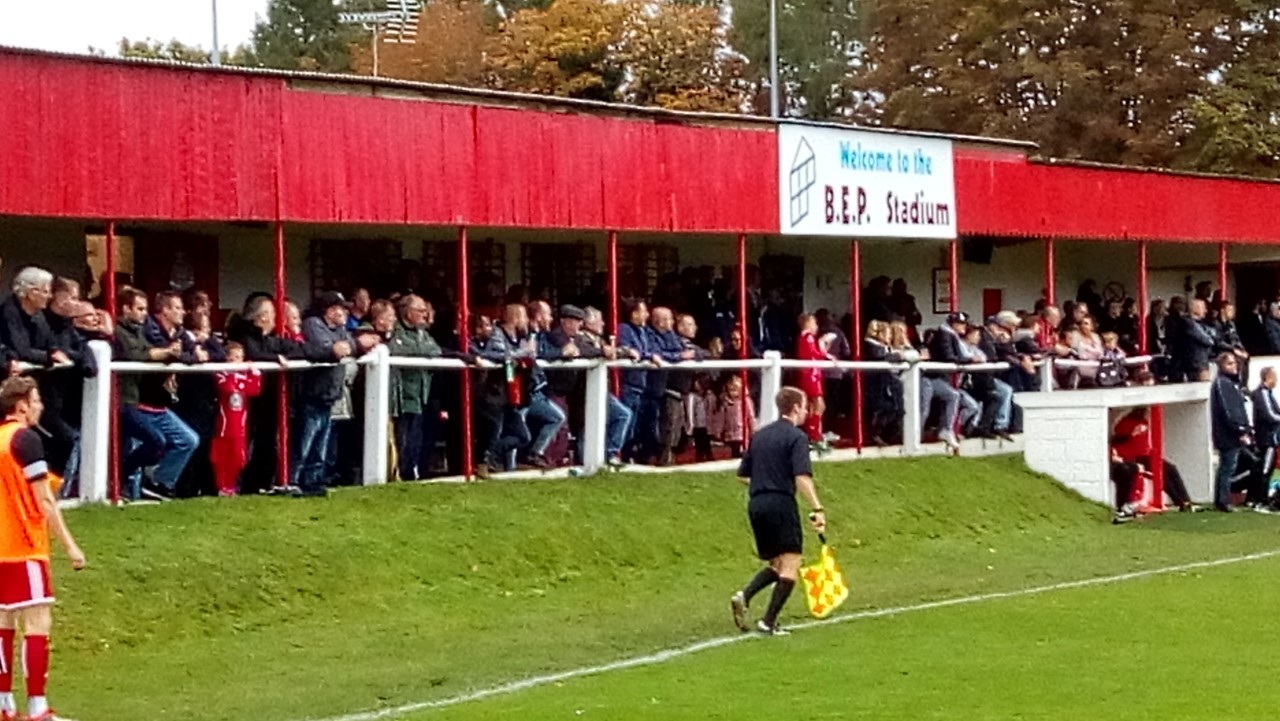
Home of Risborough Rangers FC

Risborough Rangers play their home games at The KAMTECH Stadium, Windsor Playing Fields, Horsenden Lane, Horsenden, Princes Risborough HP27 9NE.

The KAMTECH Stadium, also referred to locally as 'Windsors'. The ground was once the home of the now defunct Princes Risborough Town FC who were founder members of the Hellenic Football League. Floodlights were installed in 2012 in order to take their promotion to Division One. The ground has covered seating and covered standing facilities, and in 2022 a 100-seater family stand was built, named after long standing chairman Richard Woodward. Other stands include 'The Bob Templeman Stand', 'The Jack Burnett Stand' and 'The Derek Wallace Stand'. There is also 'The Ken Sheppard Way', a walkway dedicated to the late Ken Sheppard. All the aforementioned names are remembered for the many years of dedication spent at the club.

== Structure ==
The club is an FA Charter Standard Community Club, running a men's senior team as well as an U18s, plus youth teams at under 16 level. There is also a large thriving Junior Section fielding teams from under sevens up to sixteens for boys and girls. There are also two Pan Disability teams and a Walking Football Section for women and men aged over 50. After finishing under sixteen football, players are then invited to play under the wing of the Senior Section for the Allied Counties U18s, which is a natural stepping stone to progress to the First Team.

== Honours ==
- Spartan South Midlands League Premier Division
  - Runners-up: 2021–22
- Spartan South Midlands League Division Two:
  - Runners-up: 2011–12
- The Anagram Records Trophy
  - Runners Up: 2011–12
- Spartan South Midlands League Reserve Division Two
  - Runners Up: 2011–12
- Spartan South Midlands League Division Two Cup:
  - Runners-up: 2012–13
- Spartan South Midlands League Division One Cup:
  - Winners: 2018–19
  - Runners-up: 2013–14
- Spartan South Midlands League Reserve Challenge Trophy:
  - Winners: 2014–15
- The Berkshire & Buckinghamshire FA Intermediate Cup
  - Winners: 2015–16
- Spartan South Midlands League Challenge Trophy
  - Runners Up: 2017–18
- Spartan South Midlands Development League Cup
  - Runners Up: 2017–18

== Past seasons ==
| Season | League | Level | P | W | D | L | F | A | GD | Pts | Pos | FA Cup | FA Vase |
|---|---|---|---|---|---|---|---|---|---|---|---|---|---|
| 1989–90 | South Midlands League Division One | 10 | 30 | 4 | 9 | 17 | 32 | 64 | −32 | 21 | 15/16 | – | – |
| 1990–91 | South Midlands League Division One | 10 | 34 | 7 | 1 | 26 | 37 | 97 | −60 | 22 | 17/18 | – | – |
| 1991–92 | South Midlands League Division One | 10 | 38 | 14 | 11 | 13 | 61 | 65 | −4 | 53 | 8/20 | – | – |
| 1992–93 | South Midlands League Division One | 10 | 42 | 25 | 9 | 8 | 86 | 55 | +31 | 84 | 4/22 | – | – |
| 1993–94 | South Midlands League Senior Division | 10 | 26 | 12 | 5 | 9 | 49 | 40 | +9 | 41 | 6/14 | – | – |
| 1994–95 | South Midlands League Senior Division | 10 | 26 | 6 | 6 | 14 | 47 | 68 | −21 | 24 | 12/14 | – | – |
| 1995–96 | South Midlands League Senior Division | 10 | 26 | 7 | 7 | 12 | 35 | 56 | −21 | 28 | 9/14 | – | – |
| 1996–97 | South Midlands League Senior Division | 10 | 26 | 11 | 4 | 11 | 35 | 50 | −15 | 37 | 8/14 | – | – |
| 1997–98 | Spartan South Midlands League Senior Division | 10 | 30 | 8 | 9 | 13 | 50 | 65 | −15 | 33 | 10/16 | – | – |
| 1998–99 | Spartan South Midlands League Senior Division | 10 | 42 | 8 | 6 | 28 | 41 | 97 | −56 | 30 | 19/22 | – | – |
| 1999–2000 | Spartan South Midlands League Senior Division | 10 | 36 | 6 | 7 | 23 | 44 | 73 | −29 | 25 | 16/19 | – | – |
| 2000–01 | Spartan South Midlands League Senior Division | 10 | 36 | 12 | 6 | 18 | 57 | 73 | −16 | 42 | 11/19 | – | – |
| 2001–02 | Spartan South Midlands League Division One | 10 | 38 | 14 | 9 | 15 | 70 | 62 | +8 | 51 | 11/20 | – | – |
| 2002–03 | Spartan South Midlands League Division One | 10 | 36 | 4 | 4 | 28 | 35 | 139 | −104 | 16 | 19/19 | – | – |
| 2003–04 | Spartan South Midlands League Division Two | 11 | 32 | 19 | 7 | 6 | 75 | 28 | +47 | 64 | 4/17 | – | – |
| 2004–05 | Spartan South Midlands League Division Two | 11 | 30 | 18 | 8 | 4 | 63 | 33 | +30 | 62 | 4/16 | – | – |
| 2005–06 | Spartan South Midlands League Division Two | 11 | 34 | 11 | 8 | 15 | 70 | 72 | −2 | 41 | 12/18 | – | – |
| 2006–07 | Spartan South Midlands League Division Two | 11 | 30 | 16 | 4 | 10 | 62 | 51 | +11 | 52 | 6/16 | – | – |
| 2008–09 | Spartan South Midlands League Division Two | 11 | 28 | 7 | 10 | 11 | 34 | 43 | −9 | 31 | 11/15 | – | – |
| 2009–10 | Spartan South Midlands League Division Two | 11 | 32 | 13 | 3 | 16 | 48 | 58 | −10 | 42 | 10/17 | – | – |
| 2010–11 | Spartan South Midlands League Division Two | 11 | 30 | 10 | 7 | 13 | 53 | 52 | +1 | 37 | 10/16 | – | – |
| 2011–12 | Spartan South Midlands League Division Two | 11 | 28 | 16 | 5 | 7 | 49 | 21 | +28 | 53 | 5/15 | – | – |
| 2012–13 | Spartan South Midlands League Division Two | 11 | 26 | 19 | 2 | 5 | 80 | 26 | +54 | 59 | 2/14 | – | – |
| 2013–14 | Spartan South Midlands League Division One | 10 | 38 | 11 | 10 | 17 | 53 | 59 | −6 | 43 | 14/20 | – | – |
| 2014–15 | Spartan South Midlands League Division One | 10 | 40 | 21 | 9 | 10 | 78 | 51 | +27 | 72 | 5/21 | – | QR2 |
| 2015–16 | Spartan South Midlands League Division One | 10 | 38 | 18 | 8 | 12 | 68 | 60 | +8 | 62 | 7/20 | Prelim. | QR2 |
| 2016–17 | Spartan South Midlands League Division One | 10 | 40 | 21 | 8 | 11 | 93 | 58 | +35 | 71 | 6/21 | – | QR1 |
| 2017–18 | Spartan South Midlands League Division One | 10 | 38 | 17 | 10 | 11 | 89 | 49 | +40 | 61 | 8/20 | Ex. Prelim' | QR1 |
| 2018–19 | Spartan South Midlands League Division One | 10 | 38 | 18 | 6 | 14 | 78 | 74 | +4 | 60 | 7/20 | – | QR1 |
| 2019–20 | Hellenic League Division One East | 10 | 23 | 20 | 3 | 0 | 67 | 12 | +55 | 63 | – | – | Round 1 |
| 2020–21 | Hellenic League Division One East | 10 | 6 | 6 | 0 | 0 | 24 | 2 | +22 | 15* | - | QR2 | Round 2 |
| 2021–22 | Spartan South Midlands League Premier Division | 9 | 38 | 29 | 6 | 3 | 101 | 23 | +78 | 93 | 2/20 | Prelim. | Round 2 |
| 2022–23 | Spartan South Midlands League Premier Division | 9 | 38 | 23 | 5 | 10 | 100 | 56 | +44 | 74 | 3/20 | Ex.Prelim' | QR2 |
| 2023–24 | Combined Counties League Premier Division North | 9 | 38 | 15 | 6 | 17 | 70 | 64 | +6 | 51 | 10/20 | Ex.Prelim' | QR1 |
| 2024–25 | Combined Counties League Premier Division North | 9 | 38 | 8 | 12 | 18 | 40 | 81 | -41 | 36 | 18/20 | Ex.Prelim' | QR2 |
| 2025–26 | Spartan South Midlands League Premier Division | 9 | 38 | 25 | 6 | 7 | 88 | 50 | +38 | 81 | 3/20 | QR1 | QR1 |
| 2026–27 | Spartan South Midlands League Premier Division | 9 | | | | | | | | | /20 | Prelim. | - |

NOTE: 2019–20 and 2020–21 abandoned due to COVID-19 pandemic. Promotion achieved by PPG over the two seasons. *3 point deduction for fielding ineligible player

== Managerial history ==
- 1996-1998 - Bob Rayner
- 1998-2002 - Jon Franklin
- 2002-2003 - David Ross
- 2003-2015 - Bob Rayner
- 2015-2016 - Bob Rayner + Jamie Rayner (Joint)
- 2016-2018 - Jamie Rayner
- 2018-2024 - Mark Eaton
- 2024 - Mark West
- 2024 - Mark Jones
- 2024-2025 - Kevin Christou
- 2025-Now - Gary Meakin

== Records ==
=== Team ===
- Highest League Position: 2nd in Spartan South Midland League Premier Division (Step 5) 2021/22.
- Best FA Cup Performance: Second Qualifying Round, 2020/21
- Best FA Vase Performance: Second Round, 2020/21, 2021/22, 2026/27
- Biggest Win: 13-1 Old Bradwell United (H) - Spartan South Midlands Division Two - 10 April 2004
- Biggest Defeat: 1-12 Welwyn Garden City (A) - Spartan South Midlands Division One - 12 April 2003
- Consecutive League Matches Unbeaten: 52 games, 09/04/2019-15/01/2022

=== Individual ===
- Most League Goals: Martin Griggs - 100
- Most FA Cup Goals: Marcus Wyllie - 5
- Most FA Vase Goals: Marcus Wyllie - 7

== Notable players ==
1. Made over 10 league appearances for Risborough Rangers and have played/managed in the football league or any foreign equivalent to this level (i.e. fully professional league) or have full international caps.
- (Dominica) Jefferson Louis – Dominican international. Played for Oxford United, Bristol Rovers and Mansfield Town (all tier 4) in The Football League
- (England) Marcus Wyllie – Plays for Gillingham F.C (tier 4)
- (Saint Vincent and the Grenadines) Gavin James – Vincentian international footballer
- (England) Ricky Miller – Played for Peterborough United (tier 3), Port Vale, Luton Town and Mansfield Town (all tier 4) in The Football League. One time record holder for top goal scorer during one season in step 1 (40).
- (Sierra Leone) Manny Williams - Sierra Leonean international
