= Langley F.C. =

Association football club in England

Coordinates: 51°31′11″N 0°35′17″W

Langley
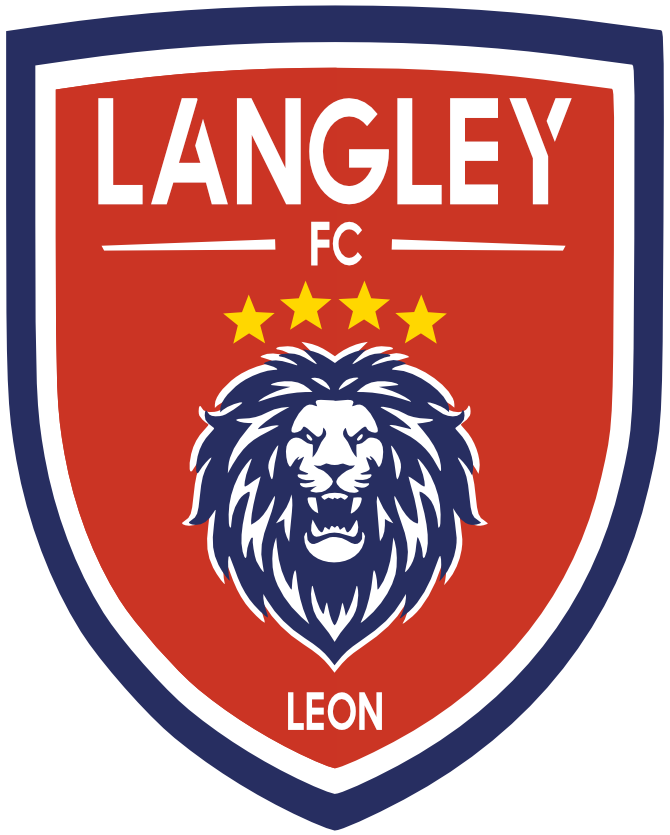
- Full name: Langley Football Club
- Nickname: The MerryMakers
- Founded: 2010; 16 years ago
- Ground: Arbour Park, Slough
- Capacity: 2,000
- Chairman: Lee Payne
- Manager: Mick Woodham
- League: Combined Counties League Division One
- 2024–25: Combined Counties League Division One, 14th of 23
- Website: https://langley-fc.com
Home colours

Langley Football Club is a football club based in Langley, Berkshire, England. They are currently members of the Combined Counties League Division One and play at Arbour Park, ground-sharing with Slough Town.

== History ==
Upon their formation in 2010, Langley was placed into the East Berkshire Football League. Ahead of the 2018–19 season, Langley joined the Hellenic League Division Two East, finishing second and gaining promotion to the Division One East after winning 24 games from a possible 28. Langley entered the FA Vase for the first time in 2019–20. At the end of the 2020–21 season, they were transferred to Division One of the Combined Counties League.

In 2022, a takeover of Langley was completed by InGame Creative, consisting of Darryl Saunders, Nick Gibson and Damian Mallinson, joined by Chris Smith.

Langley FC announced in June 2023 that Max Johnson will be taking over as First Team Manager permanently.

In September 2024, it was announced that Michael East was appointed as First Team Manager, supported by Andrew Chapman (Assistant Manager), Sam Day (Data Analyst) and Carlan Edgar (First Team Coach).

Michael East completed the 2024/25 Season by leading Langley FC to the Esoteric Recordings Division One Challenge Cup with a Penalty Shoot-Out Victory over Holmer Green before deciding to step down to focus on family life.

Mick Woodham, who has a wealth of experience and a proven track record in non-league football, stepped into the First Team Manager Role in June 2025. Bradlee Greenwood (Reserves Team Manager, First Team Coach), Ronnie Sheeran (Goalkeeping Coach), Gabe George (Physiotherapist), Ryan Case and Thomas Windsor (Player/First Team Coaches) form the backroom setup supporting Mick Woodham.

== Ground ==
In 2018, Langley entered a ground-sharing agreement with Holyport at Summerleaze Village in Maidenhead, having previously played at Kedermister Park in the Langley area of Slough. In June 2020, Langley announced they were moving back to Slough, ground-sharing Slough Town's Arbour Park. Following 3 seasons at Arbour Park, Langley announced a new ground-share at Uxbridge's Honeycroft. Langley have now moved back to Slough Town's Arbour Park for the 2025/26 Season.

== Records ==
- Best FA Vase performance: Second qualifying round, 2023-24, 2025–26
