= Bourton Rovers F.C. =

Association football club in England

Coordinates: 51°52′54.7″N 1°45′04.0″W

Bourton Rovers
- Full name: Bourton Rovers Football Club
- Nickname: Rovers
- Founded: 1894
- Ground: Rissington Road, Bourton-on-the-Water
- Capacity: 100
- Chairman: Liam Williams
- Manager: Jack Robson
- League: Hellenic League Alliance
- 2025–26: Hellenic League Division Two West, 7th of 9
- Website: https://bourtonroversfootball.com/
Home colours

Bourton Rovers Football Club is a football club based in Bourton-on-the-Water, Gloucestershire, England. Affiliated to the Gloucestershire County Football Association, the club are members of the Hellenic League Alliance and play at Rissington Road. Their nickname is the Rovers. They have a first team, reserves, U18s, veterans and a large youth section, with active teams from age groups U6 to U16.

== History ==
The club was established in 1894. The club played in the local leagues in the area playing in the Cheltenham Football League, then moving up to the Gloucestershire Northern Senior League before switching to the Witney and District League.

Neil Teague led Bourton to a Charities Cup and Division One double in the 1998–99 season, where Campden Town were pipped to the title, and Warden Hill were beaten 2–1 in a narrow encounter at Whaddon Road. This season was further capped off by a win in both Shipton-on-Stour's Hospital Cups and a Bourton self-hosted event. In his next and final season, Teague was just as successful. Having been accepted to the Northern Senior League, Rovers lost only two league games all season as they swept to the Division Two title six points clear of an ambitious Slimbridge side. Buoyed by the return to the club of the hugely prolific Matthew Winter, Bourton went on to pick up the merit shield for scoring 102 goals with Winter bagging a half-century for himself. Throughout 3 Seasons in Division 1 of the Northern Senior League, several of the players moved to play a higher grade of football thus eventual relegation followed in 2002-03.

In 2003-04, Tony Spedding took charge and led Rovers to a Division Two title, like they had 4 seasons prior. Reportedly, Bourton also reached a Senior Cup Final that season, possibly once again versus Warden Hill. However, no further record of this match or scoreline has been found.

After finishing runners-up in the Witney and District Premier division at the end of the 2015–16 season, the club moved to the Hellenic Football League for the 2016–17 season. The club won Division 2 West in its first season, but were denied promotion as their ground was not up to the adequate requirements for Division 1 football. After coming 5th in the 2018-19 campaign and now having the sufficient ground essentials, the club was promoted to Division One West along with the league champions and local rivals Moreton Rangers.

On 6 August 2023, ahead of the 2023/24 season, the Hellenic League released the following statement:

"Unfortunately, and despite best efforts by all concerned, two of our well-established clubs are withdrawing from the League before the start of the season..

- Bourton Rovers from Division One. (The Development team will continue in Division Two)
- Old Bradwell United Development from Division Two East.

We wish the individuals well for the season.

Any players that have already registered for either of these clubs, will need to go through the transfer process to play for another of our clubs this season.

We hope to see both clubs back in the uhslport Hellenic League at some point in the future."

Although the men's official first team has folded, the development team is now acting as a first team, and plays in the Hellenic League Alliance.

== Ground ==
The club have played at the Rissington Road ground since 1894. The ground was given to the club by local benefactor George Moore. The ground has two white dugouts along the sidelines, a bar, a parking lot, a home, away and referee changing room behind one goal, and a cricket field the next pitch over, belonging to Bourton Vale CC. In 2022, the ground was upgraded, as the club obtained a 100-seater stand, coloured yellow and blue to suit the club's colours.

== Media Coverage ==
The Rovers have been covered a decent amount in the news, as they are well known for their annual football in the river event, which occurs annually on the August Bank Holiday. Hundreds gather around Bourton-on-the-Water's famous River Windrush that streams through the village, to watch a match usually between Bourton Rovers First Team and Veterans/Coaches. Often, the referee is dolled up in a costume such as a penguin outfit or a floral dress, along with a wig, and the players will purposely splash the crowd when running past. The quirky tradition dates back to the early 20th century, when drinkers in a riverside pub are said to have gotten bored and decided to have a matchup in the water, growing from a 'playful kickabout to an iconic event that embodies the spirit and charm of the village.

== Coaching and Club Staff ==
Over the years, Bourton have had various team managers and coaching teams. Player-Manager Neil Teague (a local tree surgeon) was one of the most successful, in his two seasons at the club. Bourton won a Charities Cup and Division One double in his debut season, along with a few tour cups to cap it off. In his next and final season, Teague was just as successful. Having been accepted to the Northern Senior League, Rovers lost only two league games and went on to pick up the merit shield for scoring 102 goals. After this golden era, and 3 Seasons in Division 1, Bourton switched managers several times, and eventually faced relegation in 2003. Teague later became chairman of the club.

In 2003-04, Tony Spedding took charge and helped Rovers reclaim their Division Two title, like they had 4 seasons prior. He was the most successful coach since Teague, and helped rebuild Rovers from their dip in form since Teague's departure. There is not much record of when Tony left the club, and who replaced him, the next manager being recorded as Andrew Herbert in 2008 and almost a decade on from Spedding, Scott Powles.

Powles took over Bourton around 2016, and was decently successful in his time, winning the Division Two West Hellenic League in 2017. However, due to not meeting ground requirements, Bourton had to wait another two seasons for promotion, in which they both performed excellently, finishing 2nd and 5th. At the end of the 2020-21 season, Scott Powles and his assistant Phil Colmer left the club after an impressive tenure.

However, Ben Lovatt was recorded on a matchday program as Bourton Rovers manager in February 2022, possibly as a caretaker or interim.

CJ Price officially replaced Powles, but was sacked on 24 October 2022, causing a mid-season shuffle. During his short reign as coach, Price was featured on a TalkSport podcast called 'Flouncing Off.' Price, who is in fact a UEFA B Coach alongside a Level Two qualified Goalkeeping Coach, later joined Pershore Town management team in June 2024.

His assistant, Mike Connolly, took over shortly after Price's departure, but with little success with the team. During this time, reigning chairman Liam Williams and Jack Robson were in charge of the Rreserves.

In July 2025, former player Jack Robson took over as manager and is currently at the wheel of the club. The managers of the Reserves and U18s are Steve Hartley and Jack Nicholson.

== Notable players ==
Over time, Bourton Rovers have been represented by a number of players who have had notable dedication, leadership or have a high profile. Chris Hughes is a famous name to be part of the squad, having to occasionally take breaks from the football season for reality television. Danny Way, who also served under Scott Powles, was a prolific captain and goalscorer, being part of the squad that won the Hellenic League. Bourton had previously fought off interest from Moreton Rangers, however, he joined Fairford Town in the early 2020s. Other team captains have also been Craig Gilson in 2017-18 and Charlie Vinton in 2015-2016.

== Honours ==
- Hellenic League
  - Division Two West champions (1) 2016–17
- Gloucestershire Northern Senior League
  - Division Two champions (2) 1999–00, 2003–04
- Witney and District League
  - Division One champions (1) 2014–15
  - Division Four champions (1) 2012–13
- Cheltenham Football League
  - Division One champions (3) 1949–50, 1992–93, 1998–99
  - Division Two champions (2) 1948–49, 1967–68
  - Division Three champions (1) 1979–80
  - Senior Charities Cup Winners (2) 1970–71, 1998–99
