= Thame Rangers F.C. =

Association football club in England

Coordinates: 51°45′21.0384″N 0°58′33.9342″W

Thame Rangers
- Full name: Thame Rangers Football Club
- Ground: Meadow View Park, Thame
- Capacity: 2,500
- League: Hellenic League Division One
- 2025–26: Hellenic League Division One, 18th of 18

Thame Rangers Football Club is a football club originally based in Thame, Oxfordshire, England. The reserve team of Thame United, they are currently members of the Hellenic League Division One and play at Meadow View Park.

== History ==
The club joined the Senior Section of the Wycombe & District League in 2015, going on to win the league title losing only one league game all season. They then joined Division Two of the Spartan South Midlands League, which they also won at the first attempt, resulting in promotion. They were also transferred to the Hellenic League, becoming members of Division One East.

At the end of the 2020–21 season the club were transferred back to the Spartan South Midlands League, joining Division One. They finished bottom of Division One in 2022–23 and were relegated to the Premier Division of the Oxfordshire Senior League, where they play under the name Thame United reserves.

== Honours ==
- Spartan South Midlands League
  - Division Two champions 2016–17
- Wycombe & District League
  - Senior Division champions 2015–16
