= Taplow United F.C. =

Association football club in England

Taplow United
- Full name: Taplow United Football Club
- Founded: 1923
- Ground: Stanley Jones Memorial Ground, Taplow
- Chairman: Pat Guerin
- Manager: Michael Fountain
- League: Thames Valley Premier League Division Two
- 2025–26: Thames Valley Premier League Division Three, 3rd of 10 (promoted)
- Website: http://www.taplow-utd.co.uk
Home colours	Away colours

Taplow United Football Club is a football club based in the village of Taplow, in the county of Buckinghamshire, England. They were founded in 1923 and offer football for boys and girls across all age groups from Under 7 to Under 18 plus three senior men's sides and a women's team. The men's first team currently compete in the Thames Valley Premier League Division Two and play at the Stanley Jones Memorial Ground.

== History ==
The football club was formed by former pupils of Slough Secondary School in 1923, and were originally called Old Paludians.

In the 1994–95 season the club joined Division One of the Chiltonian League, and after one season they were promoted to the Premier Division. In 1998 the club then changed its name to Taplow United. In 2000 the Chiltonian league merged into the Hellenic Football League, but the club did not join the merged league and moved to the East Berkshire Football League instead. In the 2004–05 season the club moved to the Reading League.

== Women's team ==
The club formed a women's team in 2014. In 2018 they won the Thames Valley Counties Women's League Division Two South title. As of 2025–26 they still play in the Thames Valley Counties League, in Division Three South.

== Ground ==
Taplow United play their home games at Stanley Jones Memorial Ground, Berry Hill, Taplow, Buckinghamshire SL6 0DA. The club has played here since 1955, previously having played at Lascelles Road.

== Honours ==
- Slough Town Challenge Cup
  - Winners (1) 1994–95
  - Runners-up (1) 1995–96
