= East Berkshire Football League =

Association football league in England

- Founded: 1963
- Country: England
- Divisions: Premier Division; Division One
- Number of clubs: 23; 12 (Premier Division); 11 (Division One)
- Feeder to: Thames Valley Premier Football League
- Domestic cup(s): East Berks League Cup; East Berks Presidents Cup
- Current champions: Old Windsor (Premier Division); FC Bracknell (Division One) (2025–26)
- Website: https://eastberksfl.com/

The East Berkshire Football League is a football competition based in East Berkshire, England. The league has two divisions, headed by the Premier Division. The Premier Division was a feeder to the Hellenic League but lost its step 7 status after the 2011–12 season.

== History ==
The East Berkshire Football League was formed in 1963, following the merger between the Ascot & District League (1903) and Maidenhead & District League (1913). It continued to use the Ascot League title until 1964. The league was known as the Hayes & Giles League during the 1990's and early 2000's for sponsorship reason, when there were three divisions until expansions in 2006 and 2009 which saw the addition of the fourth division in 2006 (dropped in 2016). The fifth division was added in 2009, but was dropped in 2013. In 2018, the third division was also dropped, leaving the league with three leagues until 2021, when the second division was also dropped.

== Member clubs 2025–26 ==
=== Premier Division ===
- AFC Dukes
- Blackthorn
- Britwell
- Chalvey (WMC) Sports
- FC Baylis United
- FC Bracknell
- Frontline
- Langley Reserves
- Old Windsor
- Prestwood
- Sandhurst Royals
- Slough Heating Laurencians Reserves

=== Division One ===
- Berkshire Phoenix
- Bracknell Aces
- Eton Wick
- FC Cayman
- Frontline Reserves
- KS Gryf
- Mortimer Reserves
- Old Windsor Reserves
- Old Windsor 'A'
- Prospect
- Sandhurst Royals Reserves

== Champions ==
Season	Premier	One	Two	Three	Four	Five
2005–06	Red Lion	Slough Heating Reserves	Iver Heath Rovers	Stoke Poges FC	no Division Four	no Division Five
2006–07	Waltham	Holland Park	Windsor Great Park	Bagshot	Barnhill Social	no Division Five
2007–08	FC Beaconsfield	Running Horse	The Lane	Eastcote & Richings Park	Alpha Arms Academicals	no Division Five
2008–09	Orchard Park Rangers	Burnham United	Britwell	Alpha Arms Academicals	The Mitre	no Division Five
2009–10	Waltham	Stoke Green	Delaford	Beaconsfield Town	Alpha Arms Academicals Reserves	Beaconsfield SYCOB Old Boys
2010–11	Eton Wick	Britwell	Old Windsor	Berkshire United	The Crown	Admiral Cunningham Reserves
2011–12	Orchard Park Rangers	Iver	Slough Heating Reserves	Britwell	Old Windsor Reserves	Langley Reserves
2012–13	Iver	Langley Wanderers	Windsor Great Park	Iver Heath Rovers	Iver Heath Rovers Reserves	Brackburn Rovers
2013–14	Lynch Pin	Langley	Maidenhead Magpies	Britwell	Stoke Poges FC	no Division Five
2014–15	Lynch Pin	Barley Mow	Maidenhead Town	Chalvey Sports (WMC) Reserves	Richings Park Reserves	no Division Five
2015–16	Lynchpin	FC Beaconsfield	Chalvey Sports (WMC) Reserves	Maidenhead Town Reserves	Willow Wanderers	no Division Five
2016–17	Langley	Frontline	Signcraft	KS Gryf Reserves	no Division Four	no Division Five
2017–18	Delaford	Riching Park Reserves	Phoenix Old Boys	Merican United	no Division Four	no Division Five
2018–19	Delaford Colts	Slough Heating Laurencians Reserves	Britwell Reserves	no Division Three	no Division Four	no Division Five
2019–20	Old Windsor	South Bucks United Blue	Townmead	no Division Three	no Division Four	no Division Five
2020–21	Singh Sabha Slough	Iver Heath	AFC Cressex	no Division Three	no Division Four	no Division Five
2021–22	Britwell	Harts of Bracknell Devils	no Division Two	no Division Three	no Division Four	no Division Five
2022–23	Britwell	Stoke Poges	no Division Two	no Division Three	no Division Four	no Division Five
2023–24	Old Windsor	South Reading	no Division Two	no Division Three	no Division Four	no Division Five
2024–25	Britwell	Slough Heating Laurencians Reserves	no Division Two	no Division Three	no Division Four	no Division Five
