= Easington Sports F.C. =

Association football club in England

Coordinates: 52°02′50.23″N 1°20′23.76″W

Easington Sports
- Full name: Easington Sports Football Club
- Nickname: The Clan
- Founded: 1946
- Ground: Addison Road, Easington
- Chairman: Richard Meadows
- Manager: Andy Sharman
- League: Combined Counties League Premier Division North
- 2025–26: United Counties League Premier Division South, 16th of 20 (transferred)
Home colours	Away colours

Easington Sports Football Club is an amateur football club based in the Easington ward of Banbury, Oxfordshire, England. They are currently members of the Combined Counties League Premier Division North and play at Addison Road.

== History ==
The club was established in 1946 and initially played in the Oxfordshire Junior League. In the late 1950s the club joined the Oxfordshire Senior League and went on to win back-to-back Premier Division titles in 1957–58 and 1958–59. After their second title, the club joined the Warwickshire Combination. When the league was split into two division in 1960, they were placed in the Eastern Division, where they played until leaving the league the end of the 1963–64 season. They subsequently rejoined the Oxfordshire Senior League and were Division One champions in 1965–66, earning promotion to the Premier Division. The following season saw them finish as Premier Division runners-up. In 1969–70 they won the league's Ben Turner Trophy.

After winning the Ben Turner Trophy for a second time in 1970–71, Easington moved up to Division One A of the Hellenic League. League reorganisation in 1972 saw them placed in Division Two, which was merged into Division One the following year. The club remained in Division One until 2000, when league reorganisation saw the division split into eastern and western divisions, with Easington placed in Division One West. They were transferred to Division One East in 2012, back to Division One West in 2013, to Division One East again for the 2014–15 season and then back to Division One West again the following season. In 2018–19 Easington entered into the FA Cup for the first time.

In 2018–19 Easington were Division One West champions, earning promotion to the Premier Division. At the end of the 2020–21 season the club were transferred to the Premier Division South of the United Counties League. They were transferred again at the end of the 2025–26 season, this time to the Premier Division North of the Combined Counties League.

== Ground ==
The club initially played on farmland west of Wykham Lane with no changing rooms. After fundraising efforts, they were able to purchase land on Addison Road to create a new ground. Although a clubhouse was built, the only cover for spectators is provided by an overhang of the clubhouse roof. In April 2015, the club were granted permission to install floodlights. A 50-seat stand was erected in 2016 and the floodlights installed in June 2017, allowing them to enter the FA Vase.

== Honours ==
- Hellenic League
  - Division One West champions 2018–19
- Oxfordshire Senior League
  - Premier Division champions 1957–58, 1958–59
  - Division One champions 1965–66
  - Ben Turner Trophy winners 1969–70, 1970–71

== Records ==
- Best FA Cup performance: First qualifying round, 2021–22, 2024–25 (replay)
- Best FA Vase performance: First round, 2025–26, 2026–27
- Record attendance: 305 vs Banbury United, Oxfordshire Senior Cup, 30 January 2018
