= Thames Valley Premier Football League =

Association football league in England

- Founded: 1989
- Country: England
- Divisions: 6
- Number of clubs: 70
- Level on pyramid: Level 11 (Premier Division)
- Feeder to: Combined Counties Football League, Hellenic Football League
- Relegation to: East Berkshire Football League
- Current champions: Westwood Wanderers (Premier Division); Goring United (Division One); Wraysbury (Division Two); Marlow United (Division Three); Rotherfield United (Division Four) (2024–25)
- Website: Official website

The Thames Valley Premier Football League is a football competition based in England. It has a total of five divisions – the Premier Division, then Divisions One to Four. It was founded in 1989 as the Reading Senior League, as a merger of the two leagues in the town – Reading & District League and the Reading Combination Leagues. The league ran 10 divisions in the 1989–90 season, but that has reduced over the years to the current six divisions.

The Premier Division sits at step 7 (or level 11) of the National League System. It is a feeder to the Combined Counties League and the Hellenic League. Teams can be promoted from Reserve Division One provided that club's first team is not already in the Premier Division.

The league changed its name to the current one for the start of the 2014–15 season.

== 2026–27 members ==
=== Premier Division (16 clubs) ===
- AFC Winkfield
- Burghfield
- Chalfont St Peter
- Cookham Dean
- Finchampstead
- Goring United
- Henley Town
- Holyport Reserves
- Newbury Town
- Reading City Reserves
- Reading YMCA
- Tadley Calleva Reserves
- Wargrave
- Westwood Wanderers
- Woodcote
- Yateley United 'A'

=== Reserve Division One (13 clubs) ===
- A.F.C. Aldermaston Reserves
- AFC Winkfield Reserves
- Berks County Reserves
- Binfield Development
- Burghfield Reserves
- Maidenhead Town Reserves
- Marlow Reserves
- Newbury Town Development
- Reading City Youth
- Reading YMCA Rapids
- Westwood Wanderers Reserves
- Wokingham Town Reserves
- Yateley United 'B'

=== Division One (12 clubs) ===
- AFC Reading
- Allied Community Elite
- Bramley United
- Caversham United
- Chalfont Wasps
- Finchampstead United
- Fleet Spurs
- Hype Train
- Marlow United
- Mortimer
- Rotherfield United
- Wraysbury

=== Division Two (12 clubs) ===
- AFC Charvil
- Datchet Village
- Eton Wick
- Farnham Common United
- Finchampstead Reserves
- Harchester Hawks
- Henley Town Development
- Maidenhead Town 'A'
- Mortimer Reserves
- Old Salesians
- SB Phoenix
- Taplow United

=== Division Three (12 clubs) ===
- A.F.C. Aldermaston 'B'
- Berks County Rovers
- Bracknell Athletic
- Camberley United
- Caversham United Reserves
- Cookham Dean Reserves
- Goring United Reserves
- Hambleden
- Henley Exiles
- Marlow Development
- Rotherfield United Development
- Woodley United Development

=== Division Four (12 clubs) ===
- AFC Winkfield 'A'
- Allied Community Elite Reserves
- Bracknell Panthers
- Burghfield 'A'
- Camberley United
- Eton Wick Reserves
- Finchampstead United Reserves
- Marlow United Reserves
- Rotherfield United Reserves
- Sandhurst Rovers
- SB Phoenix Reserves
- Taplow United Reserves

== Champions ==
- 1989–90 – West Reading
- 1990–91 – Forest Old Boys
- 1991–92 – Reading Exiles
- 1992–93 – Woodley Arms
- 1993–94 – Mortimer
- 1994–95 – Mortimer
- 1995–96 – Reading Exiles
- 1996–97 – Mortimer
- 1997–98 – Forest Old Boys
- 1998–99 – Forest Old Boys
- 1999–2000 – Forest Old Boys
- 2000–01 – Forest Old Boys
- 2001–02 – Mortimer
- 2002–03 – Forest Old Boys
- 2003–04 – Highmoor & Ibis
- 2004–05 – Marlow United
- 2005–06 – Cookham Dean
- 2006–07 – Ascot United
- 2007–08 – Westwood United
- 2008–09 – Woodley Town
- 2009–10 – Reading YMCA
- 2010–11 – Highmoor Ibis
- 2011–12 – South Reading
- 2012–13 – Reading YMCA
- 2013–14 – Highmoor & Ibis Reserves
- 2014–15 – Marlow United
- 2015–16 – Reading YMCA
- 2016–17 – Reading YMCA
- 2017–18 – Reading YMCA
- 2018–19 – Marlow United
- 2019–20 – season abandoned
- 2020–21 – Finchampstead
- 2021–22 – Finchampstead
- 2022–23 – Yateley United
- 2023–24 – Westwood Wanderers
- 2024–25 – Westwood Wanderers
- 2025–26 – Westwood Wanderers
