= Thame United F.C. =

Association football club in England

Coordinates: 51°45′21″N 0°58′34″W

Thame United
- Full name: Thame United Football Club
- Nickname: Red Kites
- Founded: 1883
- Ground: Meadow View Park
- Capacity: 2,500
- Chairman: Richard Carr
- Manager: Ben Williams
- League: Southern League Division One Central
- 2025–26: Southern League Division One Central, 5th of 22
Home colours	Away colours

Thame United Football Club are a football club based in Thame, Oxfordshire, England. They were established in 1883 and joined the Hellenic League in 1959. The club currently competes in the Southern League Division One Central.

== History ==
Thame United were formed in 1883, making them one of Oxfordshire's oldest clubs. They spent their early years playing in local Oxfordshire leagues. In 1959 they stepped up to the Hellenic League, where they were league champions in 1961–62 and 1969–70 and runners-up on three other occasions.

In 1988 the decision was taken to switch to the South Midlands League. In three seasons in this league United finished runners-up twice and then claimed the league title in 1990–91, which saw them promoted to the Isthmian League Division Three. Two promotions followed in quick succession, putting the club in Division One in 1995. Although United were relegated in 1998, they bounced straight back the following season under manager Andy Sinnott, who also led them to the semi-finals of the FA Vase and to within two points of achieving promotion to the Premier Division.

In October 2003 the club reached the fourth qualifying round of the FA Cup for the first time in their history, going down 2–1 to Conference side Farnborough Town. Since then they have reached this point in the competition twice, losing 1–0 to Hornchurch and 5–0 to Forest Green. In 2004, due to non-league reorganisation, United switched to the Southern League Division One West.

In 2005 severe financial difficulties hit the club, with bailiffs seizing assets to offset unpaid VAT bills, and the landlord of their Windmill Road stadium serving them with notice of eviction. The club managed to limp to the end of the season playing at the ground of neighbours Aylesbury United and a rock-bottom finish saw them relegated back to the Hellenic League after 18 years away.

During the summer of 2006, Aylesbury were also evicted from their ground, leaving Thame homeless once again, leading to a new groundshare arrangement with AFC Wallingford. The results on the playing field continued to be poor, and they completed the 2006–07 season in a relegation position despite the improvement of results following the return of successful manager Mark West. Because of this, they were relegated to the Hellenic Football League Division 1 East for the 2007–08 season.

In October 2007 it was announced that the club planned to move to a multi-million pound venue at Church Farm in the North of Thame. They hoped to begin playing in their new stadium by the 2009–10 season, but as of October 2010 the stadium was still being built. After the stadium was completed, a game to celebrate the club's new stadium was played against Football League Two side Oxford United in January 2011. Thame lost 3–1 with the new Meadow View Park's first attendance of 1,381. At the end of the 2016–17 season, the club was promoted to the Southern League in Step 4 of the National League System under manager Mark West after a final day on which the "Red Kites" beat Henley Town 9–0. In their first Southern League game in decades, Thame came from behind to beat Chalfont St. Peter 2–1. In 2021 Thame United and Thame Boys / Girls merged. Richard Carr became chairman of Thame United with Jake Collinge taking on the role as Vice Chairman.

In the 2020/21 season Thame United FC reformed the senior women's team entering into the Thames Valley Counties Women's Football League. They managed to stay in the division after pulling off the great escape in the final 3 games picking up 7 out 9 points under new management.

== Management team ==
- Manager – Ben Williams
- Assistant Manager – Mike Hogg
- First Team Coach – Ben Johnson
- Physio – Hannah Bowra

== Staff ==
- Chairman – Richard Carr
- Vice Chairman Martin Pacetti
- Groundsman Contractor
- Grounds Machinery Supplier - George Collingwood
- Kit / Turnstiles – Available
- Photographer & Social Media – Oliver Pacetti
- Videographer - Oliver Pacetti
- Hospitality – Mark Hurley

== Current squad ==
As of 21 August 2024

Note: Flags indicate national team as defined under FIFA eligibility rules; some limited exceptions apply. Players may hold more than one non-FIFA nationality.

No.	Pos.	Nation	Player
—	GK	ENG	Alfie Davies
—	GK	ENG	Matthew Crowther
—	GK	ENG	Finn Murray
—	GK	ENG	James Towell
—	GK	ENG	Josh Stranks
—	GK	ENG	Leo Gaplin
—	GK	ENG	Oscar Lucey
—	GK	ENG	Alfie Tucker
—	GK	ENG	Craig Alcock
—	GK	ENG	Fabian Garcia

No.	Pos.	Nation	Player
—	GK	ENG	Jack Tutton
—	GK	ENG	Mark Riddick (Captain)
—	GK	ENG	Oliver Hogg
—	GK	ENG	Curtis Brown
—	GK	ENG	Dani Lucas
—	GK	ENG	Harry Alexander
—	GK	ENG	Jefferson Louis (Player/Coach)
—	GK	ENG	Louis Fontain
—	GK	ENG	Reece Cameron
—	GK	ENG	Rocko Tamplin
—	GK	ENG	Tom McElroy

== Stadium ==
Thame United play their home games at Meadow View Park, Thame. Construction on the ground commenced in March 2010 at a cost of £3.1m, the team moving in to the ground in December 2010. From the 2015–16 season, Aylesbury United signed a two-year deal to groundshare with Thame United.

The 20-acre site is also home to a number of local youth and community teams, 7 pitches including multiple artificial turf training pitches, club bar and function rooms.

== Club records ==
- Best league performance: 4th in Isthmian League Division 1, 1999–2000
- Best FA Cup performance: 4th qualifying round, 2003–04, 2004–05
- Best FA Trophy performance: 3rd round, 2002–03
- Best FA Vase performance: Semi-finals, 1998–99
- Record attendance (club): 1,382 vs Oxford United, official ground opening, January 2011
- Record attendance (ground): 1,904 Long Crendon vs Wycombe Wanderers, Berks & Bucks Senior Cup quarter-final, 15 February 2022

== Honours ==
=== League ===
- Hellenic League Premier Division Champions 2016–17
- Hellenic League Champions – 1961–62 and 1969–70
- South Midlands Premier Division Champions – 1990–91
- Isthmian League Division Two Champions – 1994–95

=== Cup ===
- Oxfordshire FA Senior Cup Winners – 1906, 1909, 1910, 1976, 1981, 1993, 2001, 2002, 2023, 2024
- Oxfordshire Intermediate Cup Winners – 1977, 1979, 1992, 1996, 2000, 2003, 2014

== Sources ==
- Thame United at the Football Club History Database
