= Holyport F.C. =

Association football club in England

Coordinates: 51°32′22″N 0°43′17″W

Holyport
- Full name: Holyport Football Club
- Nicknames: The Villagers, The Port
- Founded: 1 September 1897
- Ground: Summerleaze Village, Maidenhead
- Chairman: Tony Andrews
- Manager: Lee Ovens and Daniel Rapley
- League: Combined Counties League Premier Division North
- 2025–26: Combined Counties League Premier Division North, 17th of 20
Home colours	Away colours

Holyport Football Club is a football club based in Holyport, near Maidenhead, England. They are currently members of the Combined Counties League Premier Division North and play at Summerleaze Village in Maidenhead.

== History ==
The club was founded on 1 September 1897 as a result of a meeting in the George pub. They played in the Maidenhead & District League, but disbanded during World War II. After being reformed in 1956 they joined the Maidenhead & District League. The club later transferred to the East Berkshire League. They were Premier Division champions in 1998–99 and again the following season. After winning the league for a third time in 2001–02, they moved up to Division One East of the Hellenic League. In 2010–11 the club were Division One East Champions, earning promotion to the Premier Division. The season also saw them win the league's Floodlight Cup and Challenge Cup.

Despite not finishing in the relegation zone, Holyport were voluntarily demoted to Division One East at the end of the 2014–15 season after their manager left and they were unable to find a replacement. In 2021 the club were promoted to the Premier Division North of the Combined Counties League based on their results in the abandoned 2019–20 and 2020–21 seasons. In 2023–24 they finished fifth in the Premier Division North, qualifying for the promotion play-offs. The club subsequently lost 4–0 to Rayners Lane in the semi-finals.

== Ground ==
The club initially played at Windsor Road in Bray. They moved to Braywick Park in 1998, before relocating to their current ground, Summerleaze Village, in Maidenhead, in 2005. Floodlights were installed during the 2007–08 season, and three stands later erected.

== Honours ==
- Hellenic League
  - Division One East champions 2010–11
  - Floodlit Cup winners 2010–11
  - Challenge Cup winners 2010–11
- East Berkshire League
  - Premier Division champions 1998–99, 1999–00, 2001–02
- Ascot & Fielding Cup
  - Winners 1999–2000
- Norfolkian Senior Cup
  - Winners 1999–2000

== Records ==
- Best FA Cup performance: First qualifying round, 2022–23
- Best FA Vase best performance: Third round, 2022–23
- Record attendance: 323 vs Binfield, FA Cup first qualifying round, 4 September 2022
- Most appearances: Sam Jones, 216
- Most goals: Jamie Handscomb, 78 in 138 games
- Biggest win: 13–0 vs Prestwood, 12 September 2009
- Heaviest defeat: 8–0 vs Finchampstead 29 November 2003: 8–0 vs Rayners Lane 4 September 2004; 8–0 vs Kintbury Rangers, 9 April 2005; 8–0 vs Tunbridge Wells, 13 November 2012
