= Long Crendon F.C. =

Association football club in England

Coordinates: 51°46′26.09″N 1°13′39.91″W

Long Crendon
- Full name: Long Crendon
- Founded: 1886
- Ground: Marsh Lane, Marston, Oxford
- Chairman: Gerald Reilly
- Manager: Waheed
- League: Oxfordshire Senior League Division One
- 2024–25: Oxfordshire Senior League Division One, 14th of 14
Home colours

Long Crendon Football Club is a football club based in Long Crendon, Buckinghamshire, England. They are currently members of the Oxfordshire Senior League Division One and play at Marsh Lane, groundsharing with Oxford City.

== History ==
Long Crendon were formed in 1886. The club won the first edition of the Oving Villages Cup in the 1889–90 season. In 2019, the club recorded a treble of the Berks & Bucks Intermediate Cup, the Oving Cup and the Hellenic League Division Two East. Long Crendon entered the FA Vase for the first time in 2019–20. In the following season Long Crendon entered the FA Cup.

At the end of the 2020–21 season the club were transferred to Division One of the Spartan South Midlands League.

== Ground ==
In October 2018, Long Crendon announced a groundsharing agreement with Oxford City at Marsh Lane, having previously played at the Recreation Ground in Long Crendon.

== Honours ==
- Hellenic League
  - Division Two East champions 2018–19
- Oving Villages Cup
  - Winners 1889–90, 1932–33, 1965–66, 1966–67, 1980–81, 1981–82, 1982–83, 1996–97, 1997–98, 2001–02, 2018–19

== Records ==
- Best FA Cup performance: Preliminary round, 2020–21
- Best FA Vase performance: Second qualifying round, 2019–20
- Record attendance: 1,904 vs Wycombe Wanderers, Berks & Bucks Senior Cup quarter-final, 15 February 2022 (at The ASM Stadium, Thame)
