= Penn & Tylers Green F.C. =

Association football club in England

Coordinates: 51°38′07″N 0°41′20″W

Penn & Tylers Green
- Full name: Penn & Tylers Green Football Club
- Nickname: Penn
- Founded: 1905; 121 years ago
- Ground: French School Meadow, Elm Road, Penn
- Chairman: Nigel Miller
- Manager: Giovanni Sepede; James Pritchard
- League: Combined Counties League Premier Division North
- 2025–26: Combined Counties League Division One, 1st of 23 (promoted)
Home colours

Penn & Tylers Green F.C. are a football club based in Penn, near Beaconsfield, England. They were established in 1905 and were the founding members of the Chiltonian League in 1984. Currently they are members of the Combined Counties League Premier Division North. The club is affiliated to the Berks & Bucks Football Association

== History ==
The club was formally established in 1905 when it is believed that it adopted its first formal constitution. The club joined the Wycombe League and achieved its first success in winning it in the 1911–12 season. The team remained in the Wycombe leagues, winning the league on several occasions until they became founder members of the Chiltonian league in 1984. During this period the club moved to their home of French School Meadows, when they purchased it in 1949. Prior to the building of the club house the HQ for the club was the Horse & Groom Public House.

The club then spent the next ten seasons in the top division of the Chiltonian league before suffering relegation to Division one at the end of the 1993–94 season. However the club only spent a single season in Division one gaining promotion to the Premier Division at their first attempt. The club then remained in the Premier Division until the end of the 1999–2000 season, when the league merged with the Hellenic Football League, when they were placed in Division One East. The club were Division One East runners-up in the 2002–03 season. At the end of the 2020–21 season they were transferred to Division One of the Spartan South Midlands League.

== Ground ==
Penn & Tylers Green play their games at French School Meadow, Elm Road, Penn HP10 8LF.

The ground takes its name from the long since demolished 18th century school catering for orphans of the French Revolution. The pupils wore a blue uniform with white feathers in their hats giving rise to the club's blue and white strip and the club logo. The ground has had several improvements since it was purchased in 1949 with showers being installed in the 1960s, the brick building being built in the 1980s with an extension added in 2001.

The ground attendance record was set on 8 October 2025 when Penn & Tylers Green played EFL club Wycombe Wanderers in the second round of the Berks & Bucks Senior Cup, in front of a crowd of 1,237.

== Club honours ==
- Combined Counties League Division One:
  - Champions: 2025/26
- Hellenic Football League Division One East:
  - Champions: 2015/16, 2016/17
  - Runners-up: 2002–03
- Wycombe and District Ercol Senior League:
  - Winners: 1983–84
- Wycombe Combined Championship :
  - Winners: 1911–12
- Wycombe Combination Premier Division :
  - Winners: 1962–63
- Wycombe Combination Division A :
  - Winners: 1911–12
- Wycombe Combination Division One :
  - Winners: 1946–47
- Wycombe Combination Division Two :
  - Winners: 1935–36, 1956–57, 1960–61
  - Runners-up: 1934–35
- Wycombe Combination Division Three :
  - Winners: 1955–56
- Wycombe Combination Division Four :
  - Runners-up: 1954–55
- Wycombe Combination North Division :
  - Winners: 1939–40
- Wycombe Combination Division 2b Section :
  - Runners-up: 1927–28
- Beaconsfield & District League :
  - Runners-up: 1913–14
- Wycombe senior Cup :
  - Winners: 1982–83, 1987–88, 2001–02
  - Runners-up: 1983–84, 1989–90, 1994–95
- Slough Town Challenge Cup :
  - Winners: 1990–91
- Wycombe and District Ercol League Cup:
  - Runners-up: 1983–84
- Wycombe Junior Cup :
  - Winners: 1961–62
  - Runners-up: 1960–61
- Chesham Challenge Cup :
  - Winners: 1937–38
  - Runners-up: 1939–40
- Chesham Charity Cup :
  - Winners: 1949–50, 1950–51
  - Runners-up: 1963–64
- Chalfont & Gerrards Cross Hospital Cup:
  - Winners: 1956–57
  - Runners-up: 1957–58

== Club records ==
- Highest League Position: 2nd in Hellenic Division One East 2002–03
- Highest Attendance: 1,237 vs Wycombe Wanderers, Berks & Bucks Senior Cup, 8 October 2025
- Best FA Vase performance: First round, 2024–25
