= Newent Town F.C. =

Association football club in England

Coordinates: 51°55′41.47″N 2°22′52.18″W

Newent Town AFC
- Full name: Newent Town Association Football Club
- Nickname: The Daffs
- Founded: 1920
- Ground: Wildsmith Meadow, Newent
- Capacity: 2000
- Chairman: Dennis Stringer
- Manager: TBC
- League: Hellenic League Division One
- 2025–26: Hellenic League Division One, 9th of 18
Home colours

Newent Town Association Football Club is a football club based in Newent, Gloucestershire, England. They were established in 1920. Affiliated to the Gloucestershire County Football Association, they are currently members of the Hellenic League Division One. The club's nickname is the Daffs.

== History ==
The club was founded in 1920. In the 1972–73 season the club won Division two of the Gloucestershire Northern Senior League. The 1979–80 season saw the club leave the Gloucestershire Northern Senior league and become a founding member of the Gloucestershire County League. The club remained in the Gloucestershire county league until 1986, and re-joined the Gloucestershire Northern Senior League in 1989.

In the 2017–18 season the club entered a team in Division Two West of the Hellenic Football League in addition to having a first team in the Gloucestershire Northern Senior league. However the club was expelled from the Gloucestershire Northern Senior League as a result of entering a team in the Hellenic league, as it was accused of not fielding its strongest team in the Northern League when fixtures clashed. The club in its debut season won the Division Two West title and so gained promotion to Division One West for the 2018–19 season.

Newent Town currently compete in the Hellenic League Division One, which sits at Step 6 of the National League System. The club recorded a 9th-place finish in the 2025–26 season, continuing their progress at this level after a campaign that also saw the side achieve several notable milestones, including reaching the First Round of the FA Vase and securing a place in the club’s first cup final in eight years. The 2025–26 season also saw Newent record their highest points total in Hellenic League Division One, their most wins in a single Hellenic League season, and their highest league finish at this level. These achievements marked a positive period for the club both on and off the pitch. Following the conclusion of the season, joint managers Luke Handley and Zaq Hussain stepped down from their roles. After their departure, the club began the process of appointing a new first team manager, with the position currently vacant.

== Ground ==
Newent Town play their games at Wildsmith Meadow, Malswick, Newent, Gloucestershire, GL18 1HE. The ground has one stand with terraced seating.

== Honours ==
=== League ===
- Hellenic Division Two West:
  - Winners: 2017–18
- Gloucestershire Northern Senior League Division Two:
  - Winners: 1972–73
- North Glos Premier League:
  - Winners: 2012–13

=== Cup ===
- Reg Davis Trophy:
  - Winners (2): 2015, 2016

== Records ==
- FA Vase best performance: First round proper 2022/23 (3rd round)

2022/2023 Newent Town 1 - 1 Eccleshall. Then 3 - 5 on Penalties. 2025/2026 Barnstable Town 5 - 0 Newent Town.

- FA Cup best performance: 1st qualifying round 2020–21

== Records ==
- Top Goal Scorer: Darryl Baylis. 178 goals, Kevin Goff. 121 goals, Patrick Gibbs. 108 goals, Sanchez Grange. 90 goals, Jordan Cooper. 76 goals
