= Chinnor F.C. =

Association football club in England

Coordinates: 51.704172°N 0.90963632°W

Chinnor
- Full name: Chinnor Football Club
- Founded: 1884
- Ground: Station Road, Chinnor
- Chairman: Andy Bennett
- Manager: Andrew Threlfall
- League: Oxfordshire Senior League Premier Division
- 2024–25: Oxfordshire Senior League Division One, 3rd of 14 (promoted)
Home colours

Chinnor Football Club is a football club based in Chinnor, Oxfordshire, England. They are currently members of the Oxfordshire Senior League Premier Division and play at Station Road.

== History ==
The club was originally established in 1884, before being reformed in 1970. The new club joined the Wycombe & District League, where they played until joining Division Two of the Chiltonian League in 1985. They finished third in Division Two in their first season, earning promotion to Division One, which was renamed the Premier Division in 1987. After finishing bottom of the Premier Division in 1990–91, they were relegated to Division One. At the end of the 1993–94 season they left the Chiltonian League to play in the Oxfordshire Senior League.

After finishing as Oxfordshire Senior League runners-up in 2002–03, Chinnor were promoted to Division One East of the Hellenic League. They finished bottom of Division One East in 2018–19 and dropped into Division Two East.

== Records ==
- Best FA Cup performance: Extra-preliminary round, 2013–14, 2015–16
- Best FA Vase performance: First round, 2014–15
- Record attendance: 306 vs Oxford Quarry Nomads, 29 August 2005

== See also ==
- Chinnor F.C. players
