= Moreton Rangers F.C. =

Association football club in England

Coordinates: 51°59′18.7″N 1°41′26.8″W

Moreton Rangers
- Full name: Moreton Rangers Football Club
- Nickname: The Townsmen
- Founded: 1997
- Ground: London Road, Moreton-in-Marsh
- Chairman: Paul Luker
- Manager: Nick Timms
- League: Witney & District League Division One
- 2025–26: Witney & District League Division One, 5th of 10
Home colours

Moreton Rangers Football Club is a football club based in Moreton-in-Marsh, Gloucestershire, England. Affiliated in the Gloucestershire County Football Association, The club are currently members of the Witney & District League Division One and play at London Road. Their nickname is the Townsmen.

== History ==
The club was established in 1997 playing on the London Road ground that belonged to Moreton Town who had folded 3 years earlier. The club started off as a youth side and in 2004 they entered an adult side in Division Two of the Cheltenham Football League. The 2009–10 season saw the club win Division One of the Cheltenham League and earn promotion to Division Two of the Gloucestershire Northern Senior League. The 2013–14 season saw the club finish as runners-up in Division Two, so gain promotion to Division One.

The 2015–16 season saw the club join Division Two West of the Hellenic Football League. The club remained in this division until the end of the 2018–19 season, when they won it to gain promotion to Division One West. Moreton Rangers entered the FA Vase for the first time in 2021–22.

== Ground ==
The club have played in the London Road ground since 1997.

The ground was previously used by Moreton Town F.C. who had folded in 1994. The ground was also used by Newport AFC for their first season, as a means of avoiding the Football Association of Wales attempts to get the new club to enter the Welsh football league system. In July 2019 Newport County returned to London Road for a friendly match against Moreton Rangers to mark the 30th anniversary of the groundshare.

== Honours ==
- Hellenic League
  - Division Two West champions (1) 2018–19
- Cheltenham Football League
  - Division One champions (1) 2009–10
- Gloucestershire County Senior Amateur Cup - North
  - Winners (1) 2018-19
