= Wallingford & Crowmarsh F.C. =

Association football club in England

Coordinates: 51°36′00″N 1°08′31″W

Wallingford & Crowmarsh
- Full name: Wallingford & Crowmarsh Football Club
- Nickname: Wally
- Founded: 1922
- Ground: Hithercroft, Wallingford
- Capacity: 1,500
- Chairman: Glenn Goudie & Rich Eltham
- Manager: Lee Matthews
- League: Combined Counties League Premier Division North
- 2025–26: Combined Counties League Premier Division North, 8th of 20
- Website: https://www.wandcfc.co.uk/

Wallingford & Crowmarsh Football Club is a football club based in Wallingford, Oxfordshire, England. They are currently members of the Combined Counties League Premier Division North and play their home matches at The Hithercroft.

== History ==
The club was founded in 1995 as the result of a merger of two local teams: the original Wallingford Town, a Hellenic League side at the time, founded in 1922, and neighbours Wallingford United, who had been founded in 1934. The newly merged club was named AFC Wallingford.

In 1997–98, the club became champions of the Chiltonian League, and gained promotion into the Combined Counties League.

In 2001–02, AFC Wallingford won the Combined Counties League championship comfortably, and then were runners-up to Withdean 2000 and AFC Wimbledon in the succeeding two years. However, the facilities at their ground, Hithercroft, did not meet the standards of the Isthmian League and thus they were denied further promotion. A Football Association grant of £100,000 was used to fund ground improvements which would make promotion possible if they were to again win the Combined Counties League.

However, after disruption caused by heavy player turnover (with several leaving for Didcot Town, who then won the FA Vase), the 2004–05 season saw AFC Wallingford unable to avoid last place and relegation. The 2005–06 season saw an upturn in fortunes for the club, with a runners-up finish in the Combined Counties League Division One, which resulted in a promotion and with it a switch to the Hellenic League Premier Division, a league deemed better suited to AFC Wallingford's geographical location in Oxfordshire.

In 2011, Wallingford set up its first junior teams. During the close season of 2013, the club reverted to its former name, to become Wallingford Town AFC, as part of its bid to become more synonymous with and representative of the town itself and switched from the red and black kits of the past 40 years back to the original 1922 club colours of red and white stripes.

After numerous seasons in the North Berks League, the club was successful in their application to move into the non-league pyramid. In the 2016–17 season, the club resumed competing in the Hellenic League. Manager Mitchell moved into the vice chairman role and was replaced by Glenn Goudie. After three seasons of mid-table finishes, the club moved back to the Combined Counties League after the FA performed a re-structure of Step 5 and 6 leagues. Goudie stood down to take on the chairman's role after COVID-19 halted the season and the club installed Lee Matthews as manager for the 2021–22 season. In May 2022, the club finished 3rd and earned a place in the play-offs. After defeating Rayners Lane 2–0 at home in the semi-final, the team won the final 2–1 after extra time defeating 2nd placed Hilltop. For the 2022–23 season, the club will compete in the Combined Counties Premier North.

In June 2022, Wallingford Town amalgamated with Crowmarsh Youth F.C. to become Wallingford and Crowmarsh F.C.

== Stadium ==
Wallingford Town play their home games at The Hithercroft at Wallingford Sports Park. The record attendance for the ground of 2,350 was achieved when AFC Wimbledon visited in a top-of-the-table Combined Counties match in 2002, a controversial match which saw three red cards, crowd trouble, and Wallingford running out 3-0 winners.

== Honours ==
- Combined Counties League Premier Division: Champions 1998–99, 2001–02
- Berks & Bucks Senior Trophy: Runners-up 2000-01
- North Berks Charity Shield: Winners 2014–15
- Combined Counties Division One Play Off Winners 2021–22

== Records ==
- Best league position: 1st in Combined Counties League (then level 9), 1998–99, 2001–02
- Best FA Cup performance: 2nd qualifying round in 2000–01, 2002–03 and 2003–04
- Best FA Vase performance: 3rd round in 2001–02, 2021–22

== Sources ==
- AFC Wallingford at the Football Club History Database
