= 2011–12 Hellenic Football League =

The 2011–12 Hellenic Football League season was the 59th in the history of the Hellenic Football League, a football competition in England.

== Premier Division ==
Hellenic Football League Premier Division
- Season: 2011–12
- Champions: Oxford City Nomads
- Promoted: Shortwood United
- Relegated: Bracknell Town; Fairford Town
- Matches: 420
- Goals: 1,500 (3.57 per match)

Premier Division featured 18 clubs which competed in the division last season, along with four new clubs:

- Bicester Town, promoted from Division One West
- Cheltenham Saracens, promoted from Division One West
- Henley Town, promoted from Division One East
- Holyport, promoted from Division One East

Also, Witney United changed name to Witney Town.

Though Bicester Town were promoted to the Premier Division they never started the season and were expelled from the league.

=== League table ===
Pos	Team	Pld	W	D	L	GF	GA	GD	Pts	Promotion or relegation
1	Oxford City Nomads	40	30	4	6	120	48	+72	94	
2	Shortwood United	40	29	6	5	97	32	+65	93	Promoted to the Southern Football League
3	Ardley United	40	26	6	8	112	64	+48	84	
4	Flackwell Heath	40	23	6	11	90	54	+36	75	
5	Slimbridge	40	21	11	8	79	49	+30	74	
6	Highworth Town	40	23	5	12	79	46	+33	71 (Note: Highworth Town were deducted three points.)	
7	Reading Town	40	20	10	10	81	50	+31	70	
8	Binfield	40	21	4	15	86	64	+22	67	
9	Thame United	40	17	9	14	72	64	+8	60	
10	Wokingham & Emmbrook	40	17	4	19	60	56	+4	55	
11	Abingdon Town	40	16	5	19	63	74	−11	53	
12	Wantage Town	40	13	12	15	66	67	−1	51	
13	Holyport	40	13	6	21	59	70	−11	45	
14	Ascot United	40	11	11	18	71	82	−11	44	
15	Cheltenham Saracens	40	13	6	21	65	83	−18	44 (Note: Cheltenham Saracens were deducted one point.)	
16	Shrivenham	40	12	8	20	63	88	−25	44	
17	Henley Town	40	12	7	21	60	81	−21	43	Demoted to Division One East
18	Kidlington	40	9	6	25	48	103	−55	33	
19	Witney Town	40	8	5	27	40	94	−54	29	
20	Fairford Town	40	8	5	27	47	109	−62	29	Relegated to Division One West
21	Bracknell Town	40	8	4	28	42	122	−80	28	Relegated to Division One East
22	Bicester Town	0	0	0	0	0	0	0	0	Club folded

Source: fchd
Rules for classification: 1) points; 2) goal difference; 3) number of goals scored.

== Division One East ==
Hellenic Football League Division One East
- Season: 2011–12
- Champions: Newbury
- Promoted: Newbury; Highmoor Ibis
- Matches: 240
- Goals: 937 (3.9 per match)

Division One East featured ten clubs which competed in the division last season, along with six new clubs:

- Abingdon United reserves, promoted from Reserve Division One
- Highmoor Ibis, joined from the Reading League
- Lambourn Sports, joined from the North Berks League
- Letcombe, transferred from Division One West
- Maidenhead United reserves, promoted from Reserve Division One
- Thatcham Town reserves, promoted from Reserve Division One

=== League table ===
Pos	Team	Pld	W	D	L	GF	GA	GD	Pts	Promotion or relegation
1	Newbury	30	20	4	6	86	39	+47	64	Promoted to the Premier Division
2	Highmoor Ibis	30	20	3	7	72	39	+33	63	Promoted to the Premier Division
3	Rayners Lane	30	17	5	8	86	44	+42	56	
4	Chalfont Wasps	30	16	5	9	68	52	+16	53	
5	Woodley Town	30	16	4	10	49	46	+3	52	
6	Thatcham Town reserves	30	16	3	11	58	47	+11	51	
7	Finchampstead	30	14	3	13	61	57	+4	45	
8	Lambourn Sports	30	13	7	10	54	53	+1	43 (Note: Lambourn Sports were deducted three points.)	Transferred to Division One West
9	Maidenhead United reserves	30	12	6	12	67	60	+7	42	
10	Chinnor	30	11	9	10	44	49	−5	42	
11	Abingdon United reserves	30	11	4	15	52	75	−23	37	Resigned to the North Berks League
12	Penn & Tylers Green	30	10	6	14	53	65	−12	36	
13	Letcombe	30	8	4	18	52	90	−38	28	Transferred to Division One West
14	Milton United	30	6	5	19	48	67	−19	23	
15	Hungerford Town reserves	30	5	7	18	52	75	−23	22	Resigned from the league
16	Didcot Town reserves	30	4	7	19	35	79	−44	19	

Source: fchd
Rules for classification: 1) points; 2) goal difference; 3) number of goals scored.

== Division One West ==
Hellenic Football League Division One West
- Season: 2011–12
- Champions: Tytherington Rocks
- Promoted: Winterbourne United
- Relegated: Trowbridge Town
- Matches: 272
- Goals: 1,008 (3.71 per match)

Division One West featured eleven clubs which competed in the division last season, along with six new clubs:

- Brimscombe & Thrupp, joined from the Gloucestershire County League
- Carterton, relegated from the Premier Division
- Cirencester Town development, promoted from Reserve Division One
- New College Swindon, joined from the Wiltshire League
- Old Woodstock Town, relegated from the Premier Division
- Wootton Bassett Town, relegated from the Premier Division

=== League table ===
Pos	Team	Pld	W	D	L	GF	GA	GD	Pts	Promotion or relegation
1	Tytherington Rocks	32	26	2	4	104	41	+63	80	
2	Old Woodstock Town	32	19	5	8	77	34	+43	62	
3	Winterbourne United	32	18	4	10	77	50	+27	58	Promoted to the Western Football League
4	Brimscombe & Thrupp	32	18	3	11	64	48	+16	57	
5	Wootton Bassett Town	32	15	7	10	69	47	+22	52	
6	Easington Sports	32	14	8	10	56	50	+6	50	Transferred to Division One East
7	Purton	32	14	6	12	63	53	+10	48	
8	Clanfield	32	12	8	12	43	53	−10	44	
9	Hook Norton	32	12	7	13	58	64	−6	43	
10	Cricklade Town	32	11	8	13	62	67	−5	41	
11	New College Swindon	32	12	4	16	60	71	−11	40	
12	Cirencester Town development	32	11	6	15	50	55	−5	39	Demoted to Division Two West
13	Lydney Town	32	10	9	13	47	52	−5	39	
14	Headington Amateurs	32	11	5	16	62	73	−11	38	Transferred to Division One East
15	Carterton	32	9	8	15	55	73	−18	35	
16	Malmesbury Victoria	32	6	8	18	35	61	−26	26	
17	Trowbridge Town	32	2	6	24	26	116	−90	12	Relegated to the Wiltshire League

Source: fchd
Rules for classification: 1) points; 2) goal difference; 3) number of goals scored.

== Division Two East ==
Hellenic Football League Division Two East
- Season: 2011–12
- Champions: Binfield reserves

Division Two East featured 14 new clubs.

=== League table ===
Pos	Team	Pld	W	D	L	GF	GA	GD	Pts	Promotion or relegation
1	Binfield reserves	26	19	5	2	94	30	+64	62	
2	Rayners Lane reserves	26	18	2	6	77	30	+47	56	
3	Thame United reserves	26	17	3	6	93	36	+57	54	
4	Newbury reserves	26	18	0	8	61	36	+25	54	Resigned to the Reading League
5	Chalfont Wasps reserves	26	13	4	9	68	44	+24	43	Resigned from the league
6	Reading Town reserves	26	14	1	11	68	52	+16	43	Resigned from the league
7	Ascot United reserves	26	11	8	7	55	40	+15	41	
8	Chinnor reserves	26	12	4	10	42	36	+6	40	
9	Penn & Tylers Green reserves	26	12	4	10	57	44	+13	37 (Note: Penn & Tylers Green reserves were deducted 3 points.)	
10	Finchampstead reserves	26	9	3	14	46	67	−21	30	
11	Henley Town reserves	26	6	3	17	40	89	−49	21	Resigned from the league
12	Flackwell Heath reserves	26	5	1	20	44	82	−38	16	Resigned from the league
13	Milton United reserves	26	3	4	19	22	112	−90	13	Resigned to the North Berks League
14	Letcombe reserves	26	4	0	22	30	99	−69	12	Transferred to Division Two West

Source: fchd

== Division Two West ==
Hellenic Football League Division Two West
- Season: 2011–12
- Champions: Gloucester City development

Division Two West featured 14 new clubs.

=== League table ===
Pos	Team	Pld	W	D	L	GF	GA	GD	Pts	Promotion or relegation
1	Gloucester City development	26	23	2	1	93	24	+69	71	
2	Brimscombe & Thrupp reserves	26	17	7	2	56	19	+37	58	
3	Fairford Town reserves	26	16	3	7	71	42	+29	51	
4	Wootton Bassett Town reserves	26	15	3	8	45	35	+10	48	
5	Easington Sports reserves	26	13	5	8	60	29	+31	44	Transferred to Division Two East
6	Highworth Town reserves	26	12	5	9	63	39	+24	41	
7	Shrivenham reserves	26	12	3	11	56	45	+11	39	
8	Old Woodstock Town reserves	26	9	3	14	43	59	−16	30	
9	Wantage Town reserves	26	9	4	13	40	57	−17	28 (Note: Wantage Town reserves were deducted 3 points.)	
10	Kidlington reserves	26	8	3	15	43	61	−18	27	Transferred to Division Two East
11	Cheltenham Saracens reserves	26	7	3	16	34	61	−27	24	
12	Cricklade Town reserves	26	5	4	17	32	90	−58	19	
13	Hook Norton reserves	26	4	6	16	24	54	−30	18	
14	Witney Town reserves	26	4	5	17	31	76	−45	17	Resigned from the league

Source: fchd
