= 2013–14 Hellenic Football League =

The 2013–14 Hellenic Football League season was the 61st in the history of the Hellenic Football League, a football competition in England.

== Premier Division ==
Hellenic Football League Premier Division
- Season: 2013–14
- Champions: Wantage Town
- Promoted: Wantage Town
- Matches: 380
- Goals: 1,398 (3.68 per match)

Premier Division featured 16 clubs which competed in the division last season, along with four new clubs:

- Abingdon United, resigned from the Southern Football League
- Bracknell Town, promoted from Division One East
- Brimscombe & Thrupp, promoted from Division One West
- Wootton Bassett Town, promoted from Division One West

=== League table ===
Pos	Team	Pld	W	D	L	GF	GA	GD	Pts	Promotion or relegation
1	Wantage Town	38	30	3	5	103	40	+63	93	Promoted to the Southern League
2	Ardley United	38	28	7	3	100	32	+68	91	
3	Ascot United	38	23	9	6	101	34	+67	78	
4	Highmoor Ibis	38	23	8	7	77	42	+35	76 (Note: Highmoor Ibis were deducted one point.)	
5	Binfield	38	21	6	11	74	50	+24	69	
6	Kidlington	38	20	6	12	75	61	+14	66	
7	Highworth Town	38	18	7	13	74	60	+14	61	
8	Flackwell Heath	38	17	9	12	83	50	+33	60	
9	Oxford City Nomads	38	18	5	15	97	67	+30	59	
10	Thame United	38	15	10	13	64	56	+8	55	
11	Reading Town	38	16	6	16	54	53	+1	54	
12	Brimscombe & Thrupp	38	16	4	18	68	70	−2	52	
13	Bracknell Town	38	15	5	18	59	65	−6	50	
14	Wootton Bassett Town	38	11	12	15	60	60	0	45	
15	Shrivenham	38	13	4	21	77	86	−9	43	
16	Cheltenham Saracens	38	12	3	23	54	101	−47	39	
17	Abingdon United	38	8	4	26	45	102	−57	28	
18	Holyport	38	6	5	27	42	114	−72	23	
19	Newbury	38	5	7	26	60	113	−53	22 (Note: Newbury were reprieved from relegation.)	
20	Abingdon Town	38	2	6	30	31	142	−111	12	Voluntary demoted to the North Berks Football League

Source: fchd
Rules for classification: 1) points; 2) goal difference; 3) number of goals scored.

=== Results ===
Home \ Away	ABT	ABU	ARD	ASC	BIN	BNT	BRT	CHS	FLH	HIG	HIW	HOL	KID	NEW	OCN	REA	SHR	THA	WAN	WBT
Abingdon Town		0–1	1–5	1–1	1–5	1–1	1–3	0–3	1–4	1–1	1–4	1–3	1–4	1–1	2–1	1–1	1–4	0–7	1–5	0–5
Abingdon United	2–0		1–4	0–5	0–3	1–4	0–4	1–4	0–5	1–3	2–6	1–2	1–1	2–5	0–2	2–3	3–2	2–2	0–3	4–3
Ardley United	1–1	4–0		2–2	1–0	3–1	3–0	2–1	3–0	2–0	4–4	5–1	2–0	5–1	4–1	2–1	3–2	2–0	3–0	1–1
Ascot United	10–0	4–1	0–1		1–0	3–1	1–1	3–1	3–0	2–2	2–2	6–0	0–1	3–1	3–1	1–2	2–0	4–0	1–2	1–1
Binfield	7–0	3–2	0–3	0–1		2–2	0–1	8–1	1–0	2–1	1–0	2–0	3–1	3–2	3–2	2–3	2–1	1–1	2–1	1–0
Bracknell Town	2–0	1–2	1–2	0–5	0–2		1–0	2–1	2–0	1–2	2–0	2–2	0–2	3–3	0–2	4–0	3–2	0–4	0–1	4–1
Brimscombe & Thrupp	5–3	0–1	0–6	2–4	2–3	2–1		2–0	2–1	1–2	3–4	2–0	0–5	4–0	1–2	3–2	1–4	2–4	3–4	0–1
Cheltenham Saracens	2–1	2–1	0–6	1–5	2–1	1–3	1–2		0–5	0–4	2–1	4–0	4–3	2–1	3–1	1–3	2–1	3–3	1–6	2–1
Flackwell Heath	3–0	3–0	3–1	0–4	1–1	0–0	0–3	2–2		2–2	4–0	6–2	9–0	3–2	4–1	1–0	5–3	0–2	1–0	1–1
Highmoor Ibis	5–0	3–1	2–1	1–1	2–1	3–2	1–0	2–0	1–0		3–0	3–0	1–2	0–0	2–1	1–0	2–1	0–1	1–2	2–2
Highworth Town	5–0	1–0	1–1	0–2	1–1	1–0	1–2	2–0	4–3	1–1		7–0	3–2	4–0	0–2	1–0	2–3	1–0	2–4	1–1
Holyport	5–2	1–1	1–3	0–4	2–3	1–4	0–3	0–0	1–4	0–2	1–2		2–6	3–2	2–3	0–1	3–2	1–4	0–6	0–0
Kidlington	1–0	3–0	0–0	2–0	1–1	3–0	3–2	3–1	1–1	3–2	1–2	2–0		4–2	1–4	2–1	2–3	1–1	0–1	2–3
Newbury	3–4	3–1	0–4	2–4	3–4	0–3	0–2	2–1	1–7	2–3	3–2	3–3	0–1		3–2	1–2	4–5	1–1	1–1	2–2
Oxford City Nomads	8–0	0–0	4–3	2–2	0–1	4–5	2–2	12–0	2–0	1–4	4–1	5–1	2–2	9–1		0–5	4–2	1–2	0–4	2–0
Reading Town	1–0	1–0	0–2	1–1	2–3	3–0	0–0	1–0	1–3	0–1	0–0	2–0	0–1	2–1	0–3		1–2	1–0	0–3	2–1
Shrivenham	7–1	3–4	0–2	1–4	5–0	3–1	4–4	3–2	1–1	1–5	1–3	0–3	2–0	2–1	1–1	1–4		0–1	1–1	1–2
Thame United	3–0	4–2	1–1	0–3	2–1	0–1	1–2	3–1	0–0	3–4	0–2	2–0	1–3	3–1	3–2	2–2	1–2		0–3	0–0
Wantage Town	10–2	3–2	0–1	2–1	1–1	3–1	2–1	4–3	1–0	2–1	3–1	3–0	3–2	5–1	0–3	3–2	2–1	4–0		1–0
Wootton Bassett Town	3–1	2–3	1–2	0–2	1–0	0–1	2–1	1–0	1–1	2–2	1–2	6–2	3–4	3–1	0–1	4–4	3–0	2–2	0–4	

Source: Football Mitoo
Legend: Blue = home team win; Yellow = draw; Red = away team win.

== Division One East ==
Hellenic Football League Division One East
- Season: 2013–14
- Champions: Milton United
- Promoted: Milton United
- Matches: 182
- Goals: 715 (3.93 per match)

Division One East featured twelve clubs which competed in the division last season, along with two new clubs:

- Burnham reserves, promoted from Division Two East
- Wokingham & Emmbrook, demoted from the Premier Division

=== League table ===
Pos	Team	Pld	W	D	L	GF	GA	GD	Pts	Promotion or relegation
1	Milton United	26	18	4	4	61	22	+39	58	Promoted to the Premier Division
2	Wokingham & Emmbrook	26	16	5	5	66	45	+21	53	
3	AFC Hinksey	26	16	4	6	72	32	+40	52	Club folded
4	Headington Amateurs	26	15	6	5	54	35	+19	51	
5	Penn & Tylers Green	26	13	4	9	63	48	+15	43	
6	Chalfont Wasps	26	13	3	10	49	40	+9	42	
7	Henley Town	26	11	3	12	52	53	−1	36	
8	Chinnor	26	10	5	11	54	42	+12	35	
9	Rayners Lane	26	10	5	11	48	52	−4	35	
10	Burnham reserves	26	11	1	14	39	58	−19	34	
11	Maidenhead United reserves	26	8	7	11	46	55	−9	31	Resigned from the league
12	Didcot Town reserves	26	7	2	17	44	69	−25	23	
13	Finchampstead	26	5	1	20	45	61	−16	16	
14	Woodley Town	26	3	2	21	22	103	−81	11	

Source: fchd
Rules for classification: 1) points; 2) goal difference; 3) number of goals scored.

=== Results ===
Home \ Away	AFH	BRN	CHA	CHI	DID	FIN	HEA	HEN	MAI	MIL	PTG	RAL	WOE	WOO
AFC Hinksey		7–2	0–0	3–1	3–0	2–0	0–1	7–3	3–3	0–1	2–1	3–1	0–2	9–0
Burnham Reserves	1–2		2–5	0–3	2–0	1–0	0–4	4–0	0–2	3–0	0–2	3–4	4–2	3–2
Chalfont Wasps	0–3	1–0		4–3	5–1	3–1	3–1	3–1	1–3	1–0	1–2	0–1	1–3	2–0
Chinnor	0–1	2–1	3–0		3–0	2–0	1–4	3–2	6–1	0–2	2–3	0–2	1–1	4–0
Didcot Town Reserves	3–2	3–0	0–3	2–2		2–6	1–2	1–1	3–2	2–3	1–0	3–1	5–4	8–2
Finchampstead	3–6	2–3	3–1	0–3	4–1		1–3	0–2	0–0	0–3	1–2	2–3	2–3	8–0
Headington Amateurs	1–1	3–0	2–0	4–4	1–0	2–1		2–0	6–1	1–2	6–3	0–0	2–1	1–1
Henley Town	4–2	0–1	2–3	3–0	3–2	4–2	1–2		1–3	2–2	2–1	2–1	4–5	2–1
Maidenhead United Reserves	0–2	2–3	1–1	1–0	6–1	2–1	4–1	1–4		1–1	4–6	3–2	1–1	0–0
Milton United	1–0	0–1	1–1	0–0	3–0	2–1	5–1	3–0	4–1		1–0	1–0	7–0	5–2
Penn & Tylers Green	1–3	4–1	0–3	3–2	1–0	4–3	2–2	0–0	2–0	2–6		3–3	6–0	3–0
Rayners Lane	0–6	2–2	2–1	2–2	6–4	0–2	1–1	2–3	2–1	0–1	3–1		1–3	3–1
Wokingham & Emmbrook	2–2	6–0	5–1	3–0	2–0	4–1	2–0	2–0	2–2	1–0	2–2	3–1		3–1
Woodley Town	1–3	0–2	0–5	0–7	2–1	3–1	0–1	0–6	2–1	2–7	0–9	1–5	1–4	

Updated to match(es) played on 1 May 2014. Source: Football Mitoo
Legend: Blue = home team win; Yellow = draw; Red = away team win.

== Division One West ==
Hellenic Football League Division One West
- Season: 2013–14
- Champions: Tytherington Rocks
- Matches: 210
- Goals: 782 (3.72 per match)

Division One West featured twelve clubs which competed in the division last season, along with three new clubs:

- Easington Sports, transferred from Division One East
- Shortwood United reserves, promoted from Division Two West
- Tuffley Rovers, promoted from the Gloucestershire County League

Also, North Leigh reserves were renamed North Leigh United.

=== League table ===
Pos	Team	Pld	W	D	L	GF	GA	GD	Pts	Qualification or relegation
1	Tytherington Rocks	28	20	6	2	76	22	+54	66	
2	Lydney Town	28	19	4	5	78	26	+52	61	
3	Shortwood United reserves	28	18	3	7	79	36	+43	57	
4	Fairford Town	28	15	6	7	69	39	+30	51	
5	Clanfield	28	15	2	11	52	37	+15	47	
6	Tuffley Rovers	28	14	4	10	50	45	+5	46	
7	Purton	28	14	2	12	60	48	+12	44	
8	North Leigh United	28	13	4	11	71	54	+17	43	
9	Easington Sports	28	12	7	9	50	48	+2	40 (Note: Easington Sports were deducted three points.)	Transferred to Division One East
10	Hook Norton	28	11	6	11	43	43	0	39	
11	New College Swindon	28	8	7	13	36	55	−19	31	
12	Malmesbury Victoria	28	8	5	15	37	59	−22	29	Voluntary demoted to the Wiltshire Football League
13	Carterton	28	6	3	19	38	82	−44	21	
14	Old Woodstock Town	28	2	5	21	23	83	−60	11	Transferred to Division One East
15	Letcombe	28	2	2	24	20	105	−85	8	Reprieved from relegation

Source: fchd
Rules for classification: 1) points; 2) goal difference; 3) number of goals scored.

=== Results ===
Home \ Away	CAR	CLA	EAS	FAI	HON	LET	LYD	MAV	NCS	NLU	OWT	PUR	SHU	TUF	TYT
Carterton		0–7	0–1	0–8	3–4	7–0	2–1	2–3	3–1	5–2	1–1	1–3	0–3	1–2	1–4
Clanfield	2–0		2–1	2–1	1–2	1–0	0–4	1–0	1–1	2–0	6–3	6–1	1–4	1–2	2–1
Easington Sports	2–0	1–0		2–3	1–1	5–0	2–2	3–3	3–3	4–1	3–3	0–1	1–5	3–2	1–4
Fairford Town	5–1	4–0	4–1		3–0	1–1	1–2	2–3	1–1	4–0	2–0	1–3	0–3	3–2	2–2
Hook Norton	3–1	1–1	0–3	0–0		4–1	1–2	2–0	1–3	3–1	2–2	2–1	1–2	1–2	0–1
Letcombe	1–2	0–4	0–1	2–3	1–4		1–4	2–3	2–0	0–1	4–1	0–7	0–6	0–2	0–2
Lydney Town	5–1	0–1	5–2	2–0	0–0	5–0		7–0	5–1	3–1	7–3	2–1	1–1	5–1	2–0
Malmesbury Victoria	4–0	0–3	0–1	0–2	1–4	1–1	0–1		1–1	3–3	2–0	4–0	0–4	0–3	0–4
New College Swindon	1–1	3–1	0–1	0–3	0–1	3–1	0–2	1–1		2–1	2–0	2–1	1–2	2–0	0–3
North Leigh United	4–1	3–2	2–1	1–2	3–0	11–0	3–1	2–4	5–1		6–0	6–2	3–2	2–2	3–3
Old Woodstock Town	3–0	0–2	0–0	0–3	0–4	2–0	1–5	0–1	3–3	0–2		0–1	1–5	0–1	0–5
Purton	2–3	0–1	0–2	5–2	2–0	6–1	1–1	4–2	2–0	2–0	5–0		4–0	1–3	1–1
Shortwood United Res.	1–1	2–1	4–1	4–4	4–0	6–1	0–4	2–0	3–1	1–2	6–0	5–0		1–2	0–1
Tuffley Rovers	4–1	2–1	1–2	0–3	1–1	4–0	1–0	2–1	1–3	3–3	4–0	0–2	1–3		1–1
Tytherington Rocks	5–0	1–0	2–2	2–2	3–1	9–1	1–0	2–0	6–0	1–0	1–0	3–2	4–0	4–1	

Updated to match(es) played on 29 April 2014. Source: Football Mitoo
Legend: Blue = home team win; Yellow = draw; Red = away team win.

== Division Two East ==
Hellenic Football League Division Two East
- Season: 2013–14
- Champions: Binfield reserves
- Matches: 132
- Goals: 557 (4.22 per match)

Division Two East featured nine clubs which competed in the division last season, along with three new clubs:

- Chalfont Wasps reserves
- Henley Town reserves
- Wokingham & Emmbrook reserves, joined from the Reading League

=== League table ===
Pos	Team	Pld	W	D	L	GF	GA	GD	Pts	Relegation
1	Binfield reserves	22	17	4	1	74	28	+46	55	Resigned from the league
2	Bracknell Town reserves	22	15	3	4	82	25	+57	48	
3	Penn & Tylers Green reserves	22	14	0	8	61	53	+8	42	
4	Thame United reserves	22	12	3	7	42	31	+11	39	
5	Ascot United reserves	22	11	2	9	41	31	+10	35	
6	Finchampstead reserves	22	10	2	10	43	54	−11	32	
7	Holyport reserves	22	9	2	11	51	62	−11	29	
8	Rayners Lane reserves	22	8	2	12	40	46	−6	26	
9	Wokingham & Emmbrook reserves	22	7	2	13	32	48	−16	20 (Note: Wokingham & Emmbrook were deducted three points.)	
10	Chinnor reserves	22	5	4	13	31	55	−24	19	
11	Chalfont Wasps reserves	22	5	3	14	36	59	−23	18	
12	Henley Town reserves	22	4	3	15	24	65	−41	15	

Source: fchd
Rules for classification: 1) points; 2) goal difference; 3) number of goals scored.

=== Results ===
Home \ Away	ASC	BIN	BNT	CHW	CHI	FIN	HEN	HOL	PTG	RAL	THA	WOE
Ascot United Res.		0–0	0–0	5–2	1–0	2–1	0–1	2–5	4–1	2–0	1–0	3–0
Binfield Res.	1–0		5–3	8–2	3–1	5–1	6–1	5–0	4–1	3–3	2–2	3–2
Bracknell Town Res.	3–1	2–4		3–0	8–0	3–0	9–0	3–1	4–2	4–0	0–2	3–3
Chalfont Wasps Res.	0–3	0–2	2–8		1–1	1–3	3–1	3–3	1–2	2–0	0–1	4–0
Chinnor Res.	4–1	1–4	1–4	0–1		1–0	6–1	2–2	1–4	0–1	1–2	2–0
Finchampstead Res.	1–3	3–4	1–0	3–2	4–4		2–4	4–3	6–5	3–2	2–1	2–1
Henley Town Res.	0–6	0–0	1–3	2–0	0–1	2–2		2–3	3–2	1–3	1–3	0–1
Holyport Res.	4–3	1–4	0–1	5–4	3–2	1–2	4–0		1–3	3–2	2–0	1–3
Penn & Tylers Green Res.	4–2	1–5	1–13	3–1	5–0	5–0	2–0	2–1		1–2	2–1	6–2
Rayners Lane Res.	– (Note: On 26 April 2014 Rayners Lane was awarded a home win after Ascot United failed to field a team.)	0–1	1–6	3–3	6–1	0–1	3–1	6–1	2–3		2–3	2–1
Thame United Res.	4–0	4–2	0–2	2–1	1–1	2–0	3–3	5–2	0–3	3–2		3–1
Wokingham & Emmbrook Res.	0–2	0–3	0–0	1–3	3–1	3–2	3–0	4–5	0–3	3–0	1–0	

Source: Football Mitoo
Legend: Blue = home team win; Yellow = draw; Red = away team win.

== Division Two West ==
Hellenic Football League Division Two West
- Season: 2013–14
- Champions: Cirencester Town development
- Promoted: Cirencester Town development Wantage Town reserves
- Matches: 132
- Goals: 518 (3.92 per match)

Division Two West featured ten clubs which competed in the division last season, along with two new clubs:

- Beversbrook
- Oxford City Nomads development

=== League table ===
Pos	Team	Pld	W	D	L	GF	GA	GD	Pts	Promotion or relegation
1	Cirencester Town development	22	15	6	1	76	30	+46	51	Promoted to the Division One West
2	Wantage Town reserves	22	16	3	3	55	19	+36	51	Promoted to the Division One West
3	Wootton Bassett Town reserves	22	13	5	4	47	22	+25	44	
4	Oxford City Nomads development	22	14	1	7	75	33	+42	43	
5	Hook Norton reserves	22	11	5	6	42	26	+16	38	
6	Brimscombe & Thrupp reserves	22	10	5	7	53	43	+10	35	
7	Beversbrook	22	8	3	11	35	59	−24	27	Resigned from the league
8	Shrivenham reserves	22	6	4	12	32	62	−30	22	
9	Highworth Town reserves	22	6	2	14	30	58	−28	20	
10	Old Woodstock Town reserves	22	4	2	16	22	73	−51	14	
11	Cheltenham Saracens reserves	22	4	4	14	24	39	−15	13 (Note: Cheltenham Saracens were deducted three points.)	
12	Fairford Town reserves	22	3	4	15	27	54	−27	13	

Source: fchd
Rules for classification: 1) points; 2) goal difference; 3) number of goals scored.

=== Results ===
Home \ Away	BEV	BRT	CHS	CIT	FAI	HIW	HON	OWT	OCN	SHR	WAN	WBT
Beversbrook		2–1	– (Note: Awarded a home win.)	1–1	5–4	1–1	1–7	1–4	0–4	4–1	2–1	1–4
Brimscombe & Thrupp Res.	1–3		4–3	2–2	4–0	3–2	5–0	3–1	3–2	1–1	0–3	3–3
Cheltenham Saracens Res.	1–1	2–2		0–7	2–1	3–4	– (Note: Awarded an away win.)	1–2	2–3	4–0	0–2	–
Cirencester Town Development	6–2	2–1	6–0		1–1	2–1	4–1	8–0	4–1	4–0	3–3	3–2
Fairford Town Res.	1–4	2–2	0–3	1–4		5–0	0–2	1–1	0–1	0–1	0–3	2–0
Highworth Town Res.	3–2	0–2	–	1–3	2–1		1–3	2–3	1–0	2–3	0–4	1–1
Hook Norton Res.	3–1	1–3	0–0	1–1	5–0	3–0		5–0	4–0	2–0	0–3	0–1
Old Woodstock Town Res.	–	0–4	0–3	1–3	0–1	3–5	0–2		0–5	3–3	0–4	0–5
Oxford City Nomads Development	7–3	7–0	5–0	4–5	1–0	5–1	1–1	9–0		6–1	6–1	2–1
Shrivenham Res.	2–0	0–8	0–0	2–3	8–4	3–2	4–1	0–2	2–5		0–4	0–3
Wantage Town reserves	2–1	3–1	–	1–1	3–1	6–0	0–0	6–1	2–1	3–0		0–2
Wootton Bassett Town Res.	5–0	4–0	2–0	4–3	2–2	2–1	1–1	2–1	2–0	1–1	0–1	

Source: Football Mitoo
Legend: Blue = home team win; Yellow = draw; Red = away team win.
