= 2012–13 Hellenic Football League =

The 2012–13 Hellenic Football League season was the 60th in the history of the Hellenic Football League, a football competition in England.

== Premier Division ==
Hellenic Football League Premier Division
- Season: 2012–13
- Champions: Marlow
- Promoted: Marlow
- Matches: 342
- Goals: 1,290 (3.77 per match)

Premier Division featured 17 clubs which competed in the division last season, along with three new clubs:

- Highmoor Ibis, promoted from Division One East
- Newbury, promoted from Division One East
- Marlow, relegated from the Southern Football League
- From this league, only Binfield, Cheltenham Saracens, Marlow, Slimbridge, Thame United and Wantage Town have applied for promotion.

=== League table ===
| Pos | Team | Pld | W | D | L | GF | GA | GD | Pts | Promotion or relegation |
|---|---|---|---|---|---|---|---|---|---|---|
| 1 | Marlow | 36 | 29 | 6 | 1 | 123 | 40 | +83 | 93 | Promoted to the Southern Football League |
| 2 | Wantage Town | 36 | 24 | 5 | 7 | 77 | 41 | +36 | 77 | |
| 3 | Binfield | 36 | 21 | 5 | 10 | 80 | 39 | +41 | 68 | |
| 4 | Oxford City Nomads | 36 | 20 | 6 | 10 | 65 | 51 | +14 | 66 | |
| 5 | Ardley United | 36 | 19 | 5 | 12 | 85 | 64 | +21 | 62 | |
| 6 | Slimbridge | 36 | 18 | 7 | 11 | 65 | 49 | +16 | 61 | Transferred to the Western League |
| 7 | Ascot United | 36 | 17 | 9 | 10 | 75 | 54 | +21 | 60 | |
| 8 | Wokingham & Emmbrook | 36 | 16 | 10 | 10 | 65 | 43 | +22 | 58 | Voluntary demoted to Division One East |
| 9 | Thame United | 36 | 16 | 9 | 11 | 72 | 52 | +20 | 57 | |
| 10 | Flackwell Heath | 36 | 17 | 5 | 14 | 85 | 64 | +21 | 56 | |
| 11 | Cheltenham Saracens | 36 | 17 | 5 | 14 | 69 | 77 | −8 | 56 | |
| 12 | Highmoor Ibis | 36 | 14 | 3 | 19 | 75 | 81 | −6 | 45 | |
| 13 | Kidlington | 36 | 13 | 3 | 20 | 72 | 93 | −21 | 42 | |
| 14 | Holyport | 36 | 12 | 4 | 20 | 64 | 78 | −14 | 40 | |
| 15 | Newbury | 36 | 10 | 8 | 18 | 64 | 76 | −12 | 38 | |
| 16 | Highworth Town | 36 | 9 | 8 | 19 | 53 | 75 | −22 | 35 | |
| 17 | Reading Town | 36 | 5 | 8 | 23 | 41 | 85 | −44 | 23 | |
| 18 | Abingdon Town | 36 | 6 | 3 | 27 | 29 | 107 | −78 | 21 | |
| 19 | Shrivenham | 36 | 3 | 3 | 30 | 31 | 121 | −90 | 12 | |
| 20 | Witney Town | 0 | 0 | 0 | 0 | 0 | 0 | 0 | 0 | Club folded, record expunged |

Source: fchd
Rules for classification: 1) points; 2) goal difference; 3) number of goals scored.

=== Results ===
| Home \ Away | ABI | ARD | ASC | BIN | CHS | FLH | HIG | HIW | HOL | KID | MAR | NEW | OCN | REA | SHR | SLI | THA | WAN | WIT | WOE |
|---|---|---|---|---|---|---|---|---|---|---|---|---|---|---|---|---|---|---|---|---|
| Abingdon Town | | 1–8 | 3–1 | 0–1 | 2–2 | 2–4 | 0–9 | 1–2 | 0–4 | 0–4 | 1–3 | 4–0 | 0–2 | 0–1 | 1–2 | 0–1 | 0–5 | 0–5 | | 1–3 |
| Ardley United | 5–0 | | 2–1 | 0–4 | 5–0 | 2–1 | 2–4 | 2–1 | 5–3 | 4–3 | 1–1 | 1–2 | 1–3 | 3–2 | 3–2 | 2–2 | 2–1 | 6–1 | | 1–2 |
| Ascot United | 4–1 | 1–2 | | 0–2 | 3–0 | 4–1 | 1–0 | 2–2 | 5–2 | 0–3 | 1–1 | 6–3 | 0–0 | 2–0 | 3–2 | 1–0 | 3–1 | 1–3 | | 1–1 |
| Binfield | 6–1 | 1–3 | 0–0 | | 2–1 | 3–2 | 1–2 | 5–0 | 2–0 | 1–2 | 1–2 | 2–1 | 2–3 | 2–1 | 5–0 | 1–1 | 3–1 | 1–1 | | 2–1 |
| Cheltenham Saracens | 1–1 | 0–2 | 3–1 | 0–4 | | 3–1 | 7–3 | 2–1 | 2–1 | 4–1 | 1–1 | 1–1 | 5–1 | 3–2 | 2–0 | 2–3 | 4–2 | 0–2 | | 2–1 |
| Flackwell Heath | 2–0 | 2–1 | 2–3 | 3–5 | 3–4 | | 4–2 | 5–1 | 3–2 | 0–1 | 3–1 | 2–2 | 3–2 | 6–0 | 3–0 | 0–3 | 2–3 | 2–3 | | 1–1 |
| Highmoor Ibis | 2–0 | 3–0 | 1–3 | 0–3 | 0–5 | 0–2 | | 2–0 | 4–1 | 1–1 | 1–4 | 4–2 | 1–3 | 4–0 | 4–0 | 2–3 | 1–3 | 3–4 | | 1–1 |
| Highworth Town | 2–0 | 1–4 | 0–4 | 0–0 | 4–1 | 0–0 | 2–4 | | 0–1 | 4–3 | 1–6 | 3–1 | 1–0 | 0–3 | 10–1 | 4–0 | 1–1 | 0–1 | | 0–3 |
| Holyport | 3–0 | 1–1 | 1–5 | 0–2 | 3–0 | 1–5 | 1–3 | 1–0 | | 8–3 | 1–4 | 0–1 | 1–1 | 1–1 | 3–0 | 2–3 | 1–2 | 0–3 | | 0–5 |
| Kidlington | 3–1 | 2–2 | 3–2 | 1–8 | 5–1 | 2–1 | 4–3 | 5–1 | 0–1 | | 0–4 | 4–2 | 2–3 | 4–1 | 5–2 | 1–2 | 0–2 | 1–4 | | 1–3 |
| Marlow | 8–1 | 4–0 | 4–1 | 4–1 | 6–0 | 3–2 | 4–1 | 5–4 | 4–0 | 2–1 | | 4–2 | 5–1 | 5–1 | 4–0 | 2–0 | 2–2 | 4–1 | | 2–1 |
| Newbury | 9–1 | 2–1 | 2–2 | 1–0 | 1–2 | 0–1 | 0–2 | 2–1 | 0–3 | 7–2 | 2–6 | | 1–1 | 4–2 | 1–0 | 2–4 | 0–0 | 2–3 | | 1–1 |
| Oxford City Nomads | 2–0 | 5–2 | 2–1 | 1–0 | 0–0 | 3–3 | 4–2 | 2–0 | 5–3 | 3–1 | 0–0 | 3–2 | | 0–2 | 4–1 | 2–0 | 2–0 | 0–1 | | 1–0 |
| Reading Town | 0–1 | 0–1 | 1–4 | 1–1 | 2–4 | 0–2 | 4–1 | 2–2 | 0–3 | 2–2 | 0–1 | 1–1 | 3–1 | | 1–1 | 0–2 | 2–2 | 0–1 | | 1–4 |
| Shrivenham | 0–2 | 0–6 | 1–3 | 2–4 | 1–2 | 2–8 | 0–3 | 0–0 | 1–5 | 1–0 | 1–4 | 1–4 | 0–3 | 6–2 | | 0–2 | 0–5 | 1–4 | | 0–3 |
| Slimbridge | 0–1 | 3–0 | 1–2 | 2–1 | 4–1 | 2–1 | 4–0 | 1–2 | 3–3 | 1–0 | 3–5 | 1–1 | 0–1 | 2–2 | 3–3 | | 0–1 | 4–0 | | 1–1 |
| Thame United | 2–1 | 1–2 | 2–2 | 0–1 | 1–3 | 2–2 | 3–1 | 2–2 | 3–2 | 5–0 | 1–2 | 3–1 | 2–1 | 2–0 | 4–0 | 1–2 | | 3–3 | | 3–2 |
| Wantage Town | 0–0 | 1–1 | 1–1 | 1–0 | 5–0 | 1–2 | 4–0 | 3–1 | 1–2 | 3–0 | 0–3 | 2–0 | 1–0 | 3–0 | 4–0 | 1–0 | 2–1 | | | 0–1 |
| Witney Town | | | | | | | | | | | | | | | | | | | | |
| Wokingham & Emmbrook | 1–2 | 3–2 | 1–1 | 1–3 | 2–1 | 0–1 | 1–1 | 0–0 | 1–0 | 4–2 | 3–3 | 2–1 | 5–0 | 4–1 | 1–0 | 1–2 | 0–0 | 1–4 | | |

Legend: Blue = home team win; Yellow = draw; Red = away team win.

=== Locations ===
Locations of the 2012–13 Hellenic Premier Division clubs

== Division One East ==
Hellenic Football League Division One East
- Season: 2012–13
- Champions: Rayners Lane
- Promoted: Bracknell Town
- Matches: 210
- Goals: 856 (4.08 per match)

Division One East featured ten clubs which competed in the division last season, along with five new clubs:

- AFC Hinksey, promoted from the Oxfordshire Senior Football League
- Bracknell Town, relegated from the Premier Division
- Easington Sports, transferred from Division One West
- Headington Amateurs, transferred from Division One West
- Henley Town, demoted from the Premier Division

=== League table ===
| Pos | Team | Pld | W | D | L | GF | GA | GD | Pts | Promotion or relegation |
|---|---|---|---|---|---|---|---|---|---|---|
| 1 | Rayners Lane | 28 | 17 | 6 | 5 | 81 | 36 | +45 | 57 | |
| 2 | Headington Amateurs | 28 | 15 | 8 | 5 | 69 | 41 | +28 | 53 | |
| 3 | Woodley Town | 28 | 13 | 11 | 4 | 52 | 34 | +18 | 50 | |
| 4 | Penn & Tylers Green | 28 | 14 | 5 | 9 | 56 | 44 | +12 | 47 | |
| 5 | Bracknell Town | 28 | 13 | 7 | 8 | 60 | 38 | +22 | 46 | Promoted to the Premier Division |
| 6 | Chinnor | 28 | 13 | 7 | 8 | 59 | 51 | +8 | 46 | |
| 7 | Maidenhead United reserves | 28 | 13 | 6 | 9 | 72 | 56 | +16 | 45 | |
| 8 | Easington Sports | 28 | 12 | 6 | 10 | 52 | 41 | +11 | 42 | Transferred to Division One West |
| 9 | Chalfont Wasps | 28 | 12 | 5 | 11 | 55 | 57 | −2 | 41 | |
| 10 | Finchampstead | 28 | 11 | 7 | 10 | 56 | 49 | +7 | 40 | |
| 11 | AFC Hinksey | 28 | 11 | 3 | 14 | 81 | 60 | +21 | 36 | |
| 12 | Thatcham Town reserves | 28 | 9 | 1 | 18 | 48 | 81 | −33 | 28 | Voluntary demoted to a lower league |
| 13 | Didcot Town reserves | 28 | 8 | 2 | 18 | 41 | 67 | −26 | 26 | |
| 14 | Milton United | 28 | 7 | 4 | 17 | 43 | 87 | −44 | 25 | |
| 15 | Henley Town | 28 | 1 | 4 | 23 | 31 | 114 | −83 | 7 | |

Source: fchd
Rules for classification: 1) points; 2) goal difference; 3) number of goals scored.

=== Results ===
| Home \ Away | AFH | BNT | CHA | CHI | DID | EAS | FIN | HEA | HEN | MAI | MIL | PTG | RAL | THA | WOO |
|---|---|---|---|---|---|---|---|---|---|---|---|---|---|---|---|
| AFC Hinksey | | 1–5 | 6–3 | 7–0 | 5–0 | 3–4 | 0–4 | 1–4 | 8–0 | 2–4 | 1–2 | 3–2 | 1–3 | 7–1 | 5–3 |
| Bracknell Town | 3–0 | | 7–0 | 2–2 | 4–1 | 3–2 | 1–3 | 0–0 | 1–1 | 1–3 | 3–1 | 1–3 | 1–2 | 2–0 | 1–1 |
| Chalfont Wasps | 1–1 | 4–1 | | 2–3 | 2–5 | 3–2 | 4–1 | 6–1 | 5–0 | 1–2 | 3–2 | 2–1 | 1–4 | 1–4 | 1–1 |
| Chinnor | 2–1 | 1–1 | 1–2 | | 8–3 | 2–1 | 1–1 | 0–5 | 2–1 | 3–1 | 9–2 | 0–0 | 1–3 | 3–0 | 0–0 |
| Didcot Town Reserves | 0–3 | 0–2 | 0–1 | 2–3 | | 0–3 | 1–2 | 0–1 | 4–0 | 0–0 | 2–2 | 4–2 | 0–3 | 2–1 | 2–1 |
| Easington Sports | 0–3 | 1–1 | 3–0 | 4–0 | 2–1 | | 1–1 | 1–1 | 3–0 | 2–0 | 3–0 | 4–1 | 2–4 | 1–3 | 0–2 |
| Finchampstead | H/W | 1–3 | 0–1 | 2–1 | 1–4 | 0–1 | | 3–3 | 2–0 | 2–6 | 8–0 | 3–1 | 1–2 | 3–3 | 1–1 |
| Headington Amateurs | 2–2 | 0–3 | 2–0 | 1–1 | 1–0 | 2–0 | 2–0 | | 8–0 | 3–2 | 1–0 | 1–2 | 4–0 | 9–2 | 1–1 |
| Henley Town | 1–7 | 2–3 | 1–5 | 3–4 | 0–4 | 2–2 | 0–7 | 3–4 | | 2–8 | 0–1 | 1–8 | 0–5 | 3–4 | 0–3 |
| Maidenhead United Reserves | 4–3 | 3–1 | 2–4 | 2–1 | 3–2 | 0–0 | 5–1 | 1–1 | 4–1 | | 1–4 | 2–2 | 5–2 | 2–3 | 4–4 |
| Milton United | 2–8 | 1–5 | 1–1 | 0–4 | 1–2 | 1–5 | 2–1 | 3–5 | 2–2 | 3–6 | | 3–1 | 0–1 | 2–1 | 1–1 |
| Penn & Tylers Green | H/W | 1–0 | 0–0 | 2–1 | 2–1 | 2–0 | 2–2 | 5–1 | 4–2 | 1–1 | 2–0 | | 1–3 | 0–2 | 1–4 |
| Rayners Lane | 5–1 | 1–1 | 2–2 | 0–2 | 7–0 | 2–0 | 3–3 | 1–1 | 3–3 | 4–0 | 7–2 | 0–3 | | 10–0 | 0–1 |
| Thatcham Town Reserves | 4–1 | 1–4 | 3–0 | 0–1 | 2–0 | 3–4 | 1–2 | 1–3 | 0–1 | 2–1 | 2–4 | 2–5 | 0–4 | | 1–3 |
| Woodley Town | 1–1 | 2–0 | 1–0 | 3–3 | 5–1 | 1–1 | 0–1 | 3–2 | 3–2 | 1–0 | 2–1 | 1–2 | 0–0 | 3–2 | |

Legend: Blue = home team win; Yellow = draw; Red = away team win.

=== Locations ===
Locations of the 2012–13 Division One East clubs

== Division One West ==
Hellenic Football League Division One West
- Season: 2012–13
- Champions: Brimscombe & Thrupp
- Promoted: Brimscombe & Thrupp; Wootton Bassett Town
- Matches: 240
- Goals: 957 (3.99 per match)

Division One West featured 12 clubs which competed in the division last season, along with four new clubs:

- Lambourn Sports, transferred from Division One East
- Letcombe, transferred from Division One East
- North Leigh reserves
- Fairford Town, relegated from the Premier Division

=== League table ===
| Pos | Team | Pld | W | D | L | GF | GA | GD | Pts | Promotion or relegation |
|---|---|---|---|---|---|---|---|---|---|---|
| 1 | Brimscombe & Thrupp | 30 | 25 | 3 | 2 | 95 | 20 | +75 | 78 | Promoted to the Premier Division |
| 2 | Wootton Bassett Town | 30 | 22 | 3 | 5 | 75 | 40 | +35 | 69 | Promoted to the Premier Division |
| 3 | Tytherington Rocks | 30 | 19 | 5 | 6 | 87 | 42 | +45 | 62 | |
| 4 | Fairford Town | 30 | 19 | 4 | 7 | 65 | 38 | +27 | 58 (Note: Fairford Town were deducted three points.) | |
| 5 | Carterton | 30 | 17 | 6 | 7 | 73 | 45 | +28 | 57 | |
| 6 | Old Woodstock Town | 30 | 15 | 3 | 12 | 59 | 52 | +7 | 48 | |
| 7 | Cricklade Town | 30 | 13 | 6 | 11 | 73 | 58 | +15 | 45 | Club folded |
| 8 | Hook Norton | 30 | 12 | 7 | 11 | 47 | 60 | −13 | 43 | |
| 9 | Lambourn Sports | 30 | 10 | 7 | 13 | 50 | 57 | −7 | 37 | Resigned to the North Berks League |
| 10 | Lydney Town | 30 | 12 | 1 | 17 | 55 | 66 | −11 | 37 | |
| 11 | Clanfield | 30 | 9 | 9 | 12 | 48 | 61 | −13 | 36 | |
| 12 | North Leigh reserves | 30 | 10 | 3 | 17 | 55 | 79 | −24 | 33 | |
| 13 | Purton | 30 | 8 | 3 | 19 | 56 | 80 | −24 | 27 | |
| 14 | New College Swindon | 30 | 6 | 1 | 23 | 36 | 88 | −52 | 19 | |
| 15 | Malmesbury Victoria | 30 | 5 | 3 | 22 | 36 | 75 | −39 | 18 | |
| 16 | Letcombe | 30 | 1 | 10 | 19 | 47 | 96 | −49 | 13 | |

Source: fchd
Rules for classification: 1) points; 2) goal difference; 3) number of goals scored.

=== Results ===
| Home \ Away | BRT | CAR | CLA | CRI | FAI | HON | LAS | LET | LYD | MAV | NCS | NLU | OWT | PUR | TYT | WBT |
|---|---|---|---|---|---|---|---|---|---|---|---|---|---|---|---|---|
| Brimscombe & Thrupp | | 1–0 | 5–0 | 3–0 | 9–1 | 6–1 | 2–2 | 4–2 | 2–0 | 6–0 | 1–0 | 7–1 | 3–0 | 3–2 | 0–1 | 2–0 |
| Carterton | 0–1 | | 3–1 | 0–4 | 1–1 | 5–1 | 3–2 | 3–1 | 2–2 | 3–1 | 5–2 | 5–1 | 4–2 | 6–1 | 2–2 | 1–3 |
| Clanfield | 1–1 | 0–0 | | 1–1 | 2–1 | 2–0 | 3–1 | 4–3 | 4–1 | 0–4 | 4–1 | 2–1 | 0–3 | 1–3 | 2–2 | 3–1 |
| Cricklade Town | 3–4 | 2–2 | 6–3 | | 0–1 | 2–3 | 1–0 | 6–0 | 2–1 | 3–0 | 4–1 | 3–3 | 1–3 | 2–1 | 1–2 | 0–0 |
| Fairford Town | 2–1 | 0–2 | 0–0 | 4–1 | | 1–1 | 7–2 | 2–1 | 1–0 | 3–0 | 3–1 | 2–1 | 1–0 | 6–1 | 1–0 | 3–4 |
| Hook Norton | 1–3 | 2–2 | 3–2 | 3–2 | 1–1 | | 2–1 | 0–0 | 4–2 | 2–0 | 3–1 | 1–4 | 2–1 | 3–1 | 0–4 | 1–2 |
| Lambourn Sports | 0–4 | 0–2 | 0–5 | 2–2 | 2–1 | 1–1 | | 4–1 | 2–1 | 3–0 | 2–0 | 4–2 | 1–2 | 1–1 | 2–3 | 1–2 |
| Letcombe | 1–3 | 1–5 | 2–2 | 1–7 | 0–4 | 2–2 | 0–0 | | 3–4 | 2–2 | 4–0 | 1–6 | 4–4 | 1–7 | 2–2 | 1–2 |
| Lydney Town | 0–4 | 2–6 | 3–0 | 3–1 | 1–2 | 2–1 | 4–2 | 3–1 | | 4–1 | 3–1 | 1–0 | 2–3 | 2–5 | 1–2 | 0–3 |
| Malmesbury Victoria | 0–1 | 0–1 | 1–1 | 1–4 | 0–2 | 1–2 | 0–2 | 0–0 | 2–0 | | 5–1 | 1–5 | 8–2 | 2–1 | 0–7 | 0–2 |
| New College Swindon | 0–3 | 0–3 | 3–0 | 0–6 | 2–4 | 0–2 | 2–2 | 4–1 | 2–3 | 3–2 | | 0–2 | 3–1 | 1–3 | 0–4 | 1–5 |
| North Leigh United | 1–1 | 2–1 | 3–3 | 5–3 | 0–6 | 1–3 | 0–3 | 4–2 | 3–1 | 2–0 | 1–2 | | 0–3 | 3–1 | 1–5 | 0–5 |
| Old Woodstock Town | 0–1 | 2–0 | 0–0 | 1–2 | 2–0 | 1–0 | 3–0 | 3–2 | 2–0 | 3–1 | 4–1 | 3–0 | | 2–2 | 0–2 | 2–5 |
| Purton | 1–6 | 1–3 | 1–0 | 2–3 | 0–1 | 6–0 | 1–4 | 3–3 | 2–4 | 3–2 | 1–2 | 2–0 | 0–3 | | 1–4 | 1–2 |
| Tytherington Rocks | 0–6 | 1–2 | 4–1 | 7–0 | 1–3 | 2–2 | 0–2 | 3–3 | 3–2 | 4–2 | 3–0 | 4–0 | 4–3 | 7–1 | | 3–0 |
| Wootton Bassett Town | 0–2 | 6–1 | 4–1 | 1–1 | 2–1 | 2–0 | 2–2 | 3–2 | 0–3 | 3–0 | 4–2 | 4–3 | 3–1 | 3–1 | 2–1 | |

Updated to match(es) played on 1 May 2013. Source:
Legend: Blue = home team win; Yellow = draw; Red = away team win.

=== Locations ===
Locations of the 2012–13 Division One West teams

== Division Two East ==
Hellenic Football League Division Two East
- Season: 2012–13
- Champions: Burnham reserves
- Promoted: Burnham reserves
- Matches: 156
- Goals: 572 (3.67 per match)

Division Two East featured seven clubs which competed in the division last season, along with six new clubs:

- Bracknell Town reserves
- Burnham reserves
- Easington Sports reserves, transferred from Division Two West
- Holyport reserves
- Kidlington reserves, transferred from Division Two West
- Slough Town reserves

=== League table ===
| Pos | Team | Pld | W | D | L | GF | GA | GD | Pts | Promotion or relegation |
|---|---|---|---|---|---|---|---|---|---|---|
| 1 | Burnham reserves | 24 | 16 | 4 | 4 | 49 | 20 | +29 | 52 | Promoted to Division One East |
| 2 | Thame United reserves | 24 | 15 | 3 | 6 | 51 | 24 | +27 | 48 | |
| 3 | Binfield reserves | 24 | 14 | 4 | 6 | 64 | 39 | +25 | 46 | |
| 4 | Finchampstead reserves | 24 | 14 | 4 | 6 | 42 | 28 | +14 | 46 | |
| 5 | Easington Sports reserves | 24 | 13 | 3 | 8 | 31 | 35 | −4 | 41 (Note: Easington Sports reserves were deducted one point.) | Resigned from the league |
| 6 | Ascot United reserves | 24 | 10 | 5 | 9 | 46 | 42 | +4 | 35 | |
| 7 | Penn & Tylers Green reserves | 24 | 10 | 4 | 10 | 44 | 47 | −3 | 34 | |
| 8 | Slough Town reserves | 24 | 10 | 3 | 11 | 53 | 41 | +12 | 33 | Resigned from the league |
| 9 | Holyport reserves | 24 | 9 | 3 | 12 | 50 | 54 | −4 | 30 | |
| 10 | Rayners Lane reserves | 24 | 8 | 4 | 12 | 54 | 47 | +7 | 28 | |
| 11 | Bracknell Town reserves | 24 | 7 | 1 | 16 | 37 | 68 | −31 | 22 | |
| 12 | Chinnor reserves | 24 | 5 | 4 | 15 | 25 | 53 | −28 | 19 | |
| 13 | Kidlington reserves | 24 | 2 | 4 | 18 | 26 | 74 | −48 | 10 | Resigned from the league |

Source: fchd
Rules for classification: 1) points; 2) goal difference; 3) number of goals scored.

=== Results ===
| Home \ Away | ASC | BIN | BNT | BRN | CHI | EAS | FIN | HOL | KID | PTG | RAL | SLO | THA |
|---|---|---|---|---|---|---|---|---|---|---|---|---|---|
| Ascot United Res. | | 2–2 | 2–0 | | 4–1 | | 2–2 | 1–1 | | | 6–2 | | |
| Binfield Res. | 3–1 | | 3–1 | 0–3 | 4–0 | 3–0 | | | 5–1 | | 2–0 | 4–3 | 3–1 |
| Bracknell Town Res. | 5–4 | 2–1 | | 0–3 | 3–2 | 3–0 | | 2–1 | 4–3 | 2–5 | 1–0 | 1–6 | 1–4 |
| Burnham Reserves | 4–0 | | | | | 2–0 | | 3–0 | 2–0 | 3–0 | 3–2 | 2–0 | 1–1 |
| Chinnor Res. | | 0–2 | 3–2 | 1–3 | | 1–1 | 0–0 | 1–6 | 2–1 | 0–0 | | 0–2 | |
| Easingston Sports Reserves | | 3–1 | | 0–2 | 2–1 | | | | 1–0 | 1–0 | 2–1 | | |
| Finchampstead Res. | 1–3 | | | | | 3–0 | | 0–1 | | 2–2 | 3–2 | 2–3 | 2–1 |
| Holyport Res. | 4–2 | 1–4 | | 0–4 | 1–3 | 4–1 | | | 2–2 | 5–0 | 2–2 | 2–4 | 0–4 |
| Kidlington Res. | 2–2 | 2–4 | | 0–2 | | 0–2 | | 1–4 | | 1–1 | | 0–11 | 0–2 |
| Penn & Tylers Green Res. | | 4–3 | | | 5–1 | | | 2–1 | | | 3–2 | | |
| Rayners Lane Res. | 1–3 | | 8–1 | | 4–2 | | 0–3 | 2–3 | 7–1 | 3–0 | | 2–1 | |
| Slough Town Reserves | | 3–3 | | | 3–0 | 3–4 | | 2–3 | | 2–1 | | | |
| Thame United Res. | | 3–2 | | 1–0 | 3–1 | 4–0 | 0–1 | | | | | | |

Updated to match(es) played on 5 March 2013. Source: Results
Legend: Blue = home team win; Yellow = draw; Red = away team win.

== Division Two West ==
Hellenic Football League Division Two West
- Season: 2012–13
- Champions: Shortwood United reserves
- Promoted: Shortwood United reserves
- Matches: 132
- Goals: 611 (4.63 per match)

Division Two West featured eleven clubs which competed in the division last season, along with three new clubs:

- Cirencester Town development, demoted from Division One West
- Letcombe reserves, transferred from Division Two East
- Shortwood United reserves

=== League table ===
| Pos | Team | Pld | W | D | L | GF | GA | GD | Pts | Promotion or relegation |
|---|---|---|---|---|---|---|---|---|---|---|
| 1 | Shortwood United reserves | 22 | 18 | 1 | 3 | 70 | 18 | +52 | 55 | Promoted to Division One West |
| 2 | Brimscombe & Thrupp reserves | 22 | 16 | 2 | 4 | 72 | 30 | +42 | 50 | |
| 3 | Cirencester Town development | 22 | 15 | 3 | 4 | 83 | 35 | +48 | 48 | |
| 4 | Highworth Town reserves | 22 | 13 | 2 | 7 | 62 | 45 | +17 | 41 | |
| 5 | Wootton Bassett Town reserves | 22 | 12 | 1 | 9 | 46 | 35 | +11 | 37 | |
| 6 | Cheltenham Saracens reserves | 22 | 10 | 0 | 12 | 66 | 47 | +19 | 30 | |
| 7 | Wantage Town reserves | 22 | 9 | 2 | 11 | 43 | 53 | −10 | 29 | |
| 8 | Fairford Town reserves | 22 | 8 | 2 | 12 | 45 | 60 | −15 | 26 | |
| 9 | Old Woodstock Town reserves | 22 | 7 | 1 | 14 | 34 | 66 | −32 | 22 | |
| 10 | Shrivenham reserves | 22 | 4 | 5 | 13 | 36 | 65 | −29 | 17 | |
| 11 | Hook Norton reserves | 22 | 5 | 2 | 15 | 31 | 62 | −31 | 17 | |
| 12 | Letcombe reserves | 22 | 4 | 1 | 17 | 23 | 95 | −72 | 13 | Resigned from the league |
| 13 | Cricklade Town reserves | 0 | 0 | 0 | 0 | 0 | 0 | 0 | 0 | Resigned, record expunged |
| 14 | Gloucester City development | 0 | 0 | 0 | 0 | 0 | 0 | 0 | 0 | Resigned, record expunged |

Source: fchd
Rules for classification: 1) points; 2) goal difference; 3) number of goals scored.

=== Results ===
| Home \ Away | BRT | CHS | CIT | CRI | FAI | GLC | HIW | HON | LET | OWT | SHU | SHR | WAN | WBT |
|---|---|---|---|---|---|---|---|---|---|---|---|---|---|---|
| Brimscombe & Thrupp Res. | | 5–1 | 1–2 | | 6–1 | | 7–1 | 9–2 | | 3–1 | | 3–1 | 5–0 | 5–0 |
| Cheltenham Saracens Res. | 2–3 | | 4–2 | | 8–4 | | 0–1 | 2–1 | 7–1 | 8–0 | 1–4 | 4–2 | 2–3 | 3–2 |
| Cirencester Town Development | 5–2 | 2–1 | | | 3–3 | | 7–4 | 4–0 | 8–0 | 10–0 | 1–2 | | 4–0 | 4–2 |
| Cricklade Town Reserves | | | | | | | | | | | | | | |
| Fairford Town Res. | 0–2 | 2–1 | 1–3 | | | | 0–1 | | 3–4 | 5–1 | 0–3 | 3–1 | 5–3 | 1–4 |
| Gloucester City 'Dev' | | | | | | | | | | | | | | |
| Highworth Town Res. | 0–2 | 3–1 | 1–1 | | 4–1 | | | 4–1 | 1–3 | 2–3 | 5–1 | 3–1 | 2–2 | 3–2 |
| Hook Norton Res. | 1–2 | 3–2 | | | 3–3 | | 0–3 | | 4–1 | 1–2 | 1–3 | 2–2 | 2–0 | 2–4 |
| Letcombe Reserves | 0–8 | 1–5 | 0–6 | | | | 2–6 | 2–0 | | 2–3 | 0–4 | 0–4 | 0–2 | 0–5 |
| Old Woodstock Town Res. | 1–4 | 0–6 | 0–0 | | 0–2 | | 2–3 | 7–1 | 3–0 | | 1–6 | 4–1 | 3–0 | 2–3 |
| Shortwood United Res. | 4–0 | | 4–2 | | 0–1 | | 1–0 | 2–0 | 11–0 | 3–1 | | 0–2 | | 1–0 |
| Shrivenham Res. | 1–1 | 4–5 | 1–2 | | 2–4 | | 2–10 | 1–0 | | 2–0 | 3–3 | | | 0–4 |
| Wantage Town reserves | 1–2 | 4–3 | 3–5 | | | | 4–1 | 0–2 | 5–2 | 3–0 | 0–3 | 5–1 | | 2–0 |
| Wootton Bassett Town Res. | 1–1 | | 2–0 | | 2–0 | | 2–4 | 0–2 | 5–0 | 1–0 | 0–5 | 3–0 | 4–0 | |

Updated to match(es) played on 25 April 2013. Source: Results
Legend: Blue = home team win; Yellow = draw; Red = away team win.
