= 2014–15 Hellenic Football League =

The 2014–15 Hellenic Football League season was the 62nd in the history of the Hellenic Football League, a football competition in England.

== Premier Division ==
Hellenic Football League Premier Division
- Season: 2014–15
- Champions: Flackwell Heath
- Relegated: Holyport; Reading Town; Shrivenham; Cheltenham Saracens
- Matches: 380
- Goals: 1,363 (3.59 per match)

Premier Division featured 18 clubs which competed in the division last season, along with two new clubs:

- Milton United, promoted from Division One East
- Thatcham Town, resigned from the Southern Football League

=== League table ===
Pos	Team	Pld	W	D	L	GF	GA	GD	Pts	Relegation
1	Flackwell Heath	38	31	6	1	133	33	+100	99	
2	Highmoor Ibis	38	27	6	5	93	35	+58	87	
3	Ascot United	38	26	5	7	80	40	+40	83	
4	Kidlington	38	21	9	8	81	46	+35	72	
5	Thame United	38	22	3	13	73	56	+17	69	
6	Binfield	38	20	8	10	88	47	+41	68	
7	Highworth Town	38	20	7	11	78	46	+32	67	
8	Ardley United	38	21	4	13	71	53	+18	67	
9	Bracknell Town	38	17	5	16	67	57	+10	56	
10	Brimscombe & Thrupp	38	16	6	16	71	73	−2	54	
11	Wootton Bassett Town	38	14	9	15	66	78	−12	51	
12	Thatcham Town	38	14	5	19	60	65	−5	47	
13	Oxford City Nomads	38	14	5	19	73	86	−13	47	
14	Milton United	38	11	9	18	47	78	−31	42	
15	Abingdon United	38	9	13	16	68	78	−10	40	
16	Holyport	38	10	8	20	46	81	−35	38	Relegated to Division One East
17	Reading Town	38	12	1	25	60	87	−27	37	Relegated to Division One East
18	Newbury	38	9	7	22	46	74	−28	34	Resigned to the Thames Valley League
19	Shrivenham	38	3	6	29	33	120	−87	15	Relegated to Division One West
20	Cheltenham Saracens	38	1	2	35	29	130	−101	5	Relegated to Division One West

Source: fchd
Rules for classification: 1) points; 2) goal difference; 3) number of goals scored.

=== Results ===
Home \ Away	ABI	ARD	ASC	BIN	BNT	BRT	CHS	FLH	HIG	HIW	HOL	KID	MIL	NEW	OCN	REA	SHR	THM	THT	WBT
Abingdon United		0–0	4–1	1–4	1–3	0–0	5–1	3–3	2–3	0–0	2–2	3–3	2–2	0–0	1–5	1–4	3–0	0–3	2–5	2–2
Ardley United	4–3		0–3	2–0	2–3	2–1	3–1	1–3	4–0	1–0	1–2	1–2	4–0	3–0	3–2	2–0	6–0	0–2	1–1	2–1
Ascot United	3–1	2–1		0–0	0–3	1–0	5–0	1–4	0–1	4–1	2–0	2–2	3–2	2–1	8–0	3–1	0–2	1–1	4–1	3–1
Binfield	2–0	1–2	0–0		3–1	3–3	6–1	0–2	3–3	1–0	4–2	0–2	8–0	2–1	2–3	6–0	4–2	1–2	1–1	6–1
Bracknell Town	0–2	0–1	1–2	2–0		2–3	5–2	0–3	2–0	0–0	3–0	1–2	2–2	3–1	3–2	1–0	3–0	1–2	4–3	2–2
Brimscombe & Thrupp	1–1	3–0	1–5	3–2	4–2		8–1	0–6	1–6	1–1	1–0	1–1	1–4	4–0	3–0	0–2	5–0	1–0	3–0	1–3
Cheltenham Saracens	0–1	0–2	0–1	0–7	0–2	2–3		0–6	0–5	0–5	0–0	0–1	2–3	2–1	1–4	0–3	1–2	0–2	0–1	2–3
Flackwell Heath	4–1	4–2	3–0	1–3	3–1	2–1	7–0		2–2	2–1	6–0	2–2	3–3	2–1	3–1	2–1	8–0	2–0	3–2	2–2
Highmoor Ibis	2–1	2–1	1–0	4–0	2–0	2–0	7–0	1–3		0–1	2–1	0–0	6–1	3–0	2–0	3–1	1–0	1–0	0–0	6–0
Highworth Town	2–2	0–1	1–1	0–1	2–0	2–1	3–2	1–4	1–5		5–0	2–0	2–2	3–0	4–2	3–1	4–0	3–0	4–1	1–5
Holyport	1–5	1–1	0–2	0–0	1–1	2–1	2–1	0–1	0–1	2–2		2–3	2–1	1–4	4–3	1–1	1–0	1–1	0–5	1–0
Kidlington	3–2	3–3	1–2	2–0	3–1	1–0	5–2	1–3	3–1	3–0	5–0		3–0	2–0	1–1	1–3	4–2	0–1	6–1	5–0
Milton United	0–1	0–4	0–1	0–1	1–0	1–3	3–2	0–6	0–4	0–2	1–2	0–0		0–0	1–1	0–1	0–0	1–3	2–1	2–1
Newbury	3–3	1–2	0–2	0–3	0–2	6–0	1–0	1–1	2–2	0–3	4–2	0–4	1–2		1–1	1–3	3–0	0–4	3–2	0–1
Oxford City Nomads	2–4	2–3	1–3	3–3	4–2	2–0	4–2	0–3	1–3	3–2	2–0	0–3	1–4	2–3		2–0	1–2	4–1	2–1	3–0
Reading Town	3–2	1–2	2–3	2–3	0–3	2–3	2–0	0–4	2–4	1–3	0–2	2–1	0–2	1–2	3–4		6–1	2–7	2–4	1–3
Shrivenham	0–3	2–4	1–2	0–3	1–1	3–3	0–0	0–11	2–3	0–6	1–7	1–2	2–2	0–2	1–4	1–2		1–2	1–3	1–2
Thame United	3–2	4–0	0–4	1–3	2–0	2–3	5–3	1–3	0–2	3–2	2–1	2–1	0–1	3–1	2–0	2–1	4–3		0–2	4–1
Thatcham Town	4–1	1–0	0–1	0–1	1–2	0–4	2–0	1–2	0–0	1–2	3–2	1–2	1–3	1–1	2–0	1–3	3–0	2–0		1–3
Wootton Bassett Town	1–1	2–0	2–3	1–1	0–5	4–1	5–1	0–5	1–3	0–1	4–1	1–1	2–1	3–1	2–2	4–1	1–1	2–2	0–2	

Updated to match(es) played on 23 April 2015. Source: Hellenic League
Legend: Blue = home team win; Yellow = draw; Red = away team win.

== Division One East ==
Hellenic Football League Division One East
- Season: 2014–15
- Champions: Wokingham & Emmbrook
- Promoted: Brackley Town development Wokingham & Emmbrook
- Matches: 182
- Goals: 727 (3.99 per match)

Division One East featured eleven clubs which competed in the division last season, along with three new clubs:

- Brackley Town development
- Easington Sports, transferred from Division One West
- Old Woodstock Town, transferred from Division One West

=== League table ===
Pos	Team	Pld	W	D	L	GF	GA	GD	Pts	Promotion
1	Wokingham & Emmbrook	26	19	4	3	74	21	+53	61	Promoted to the Premier Division
2	Brackley Town development	26	15	7	4	59	38	+21	52	Promoted to the Premier Division
3	Old Woodstock Town	26	16	2	8	62	33	+29	50	
4	Easington Sports	26	14	5	7	59	41	+18	47	Transferred to Division One West
5	Chinnor	26	12	4	10	61	46	+15	40	
6	Henley Town	26	11	7	8	64	52	+12	40	
7	Woodley Town	26	10	6	10	42	52	−10	36	
8	Rayners Lane	26	10	5	11	58	58	0	35	
9	Penn & Tylers Green	26	9	5	12	50	48	+2	32	
10	Finchampstead	26	9	6	11	44	54	−10	30 (Note: Finchampstead were deducted three points for fielding an ineligible player against Easington Sports on 9 August.)	
11	Headington Amateurs	26	7	6	13	42	50	−8	27	
12	Didcot Town reserves	26	7	4	15	40	54	−14	25	
13	Burnham reserves	26	6	3	17	38	70	−32	21	Resigned from the league
14	Chalfont Wasps	26	3	4	19	34	110	−76	13	

Source: fchd
Rules for classification: 1) points; 2) goal difference; 3) number of goals scored.

=== Results ===
Home \ Away	BRA	BUR	CHA	CHI	DID	EAS	FIN	HEA	HEN	OWT	PTG	RAL	WOE	WOO
Brackley Town development		2–1	2–2	1–0	4–1	2–4	1–0	3–0	1–1	1–5	3–1	2–0	2–1	4–1
Burnham	1–2		3–2	1–3	0–1	0–5	2–2	0–0	2–2	1–3	0–3	4–2	1–0	0–1
Chalfont Wasps	1–5	0–9		2–4	0–8	2–6	1–1	2–8	0–4	1–4	1–4	1–7	1–1	1–2
Chinnor	3–3	4–3	1–0		7–1	2–1	3–1	1–1	3–2	0–2	1–2	4–1	2–3	2–3
Didcot Town Reserves	1–2	1–0	1–1	3–5		1–2	0–2	0–1	4–4	1–2	0–3	2–3	1–2	1–1
Easington Sports	1–1	6–0	7–1	0–5	2–1		0–2	1–0	1–0	5–3	1–0	2–1	1–3	3–0
Finchampstead	1–1	3–0	2–3	1–5	3–2	5–2		0–0	2–0	1–0	3–3	3–3	1–2	2–1
Headington Amateurs	2–6	8–1	1–3	2–0	0–0	1–2	3–2		1–4	0–4	1–3	4–1	1–2	1–1
Henley Town	3–2	3–2	5–2	1–1	2–3	3–0	3–4	5–3		3–1	6–2	1–1	2–4	2–2
Old Woodstock Town	1–1	1–0	4–2	1–0	3–0	2–1	8–0	1–2	2–2		2–0	1–0	2–0	1–2
Penn & Tylers Green	2–3	2–3	1–2	2–1	3–4	1–1	2–1	1–1	0–2	3–0		1–3	2–3	3–4
Rayners Lane	5–4	0–2	7–1	3–2	1–2	3–3	2–0	2–0	2–4	4–3	1–1		0–3	3–0
Wokingham & Emmbrook	0–0	10–1	10–0	4–0	1–0	1–1	3–0	0–5	4–0	3–0	1–1	5–0		2–1
Woodley Town	0–1	4–1	3–2	2–2	0–1	1–1	4–2	3–1	3–0	2–0	0–4	3–3	0–4	

Updated to match(es) played on 18 April 2015. Source: Hellenic League
Legend: Blue = home team win; Yellow = draw; Red = away team win.

== Division One West ==
Hellenic Football League Division One West
- Season: 2014–15
- Champions: Longlevens
- Promoted: Longlevens; Lydney Town; Tuffley Rovers
- Matches: 210
- Goals: 862 (4.1 per match)

Division One West featured twelve clubs which competed in the division last season, along with three new clubs:

- Cirencester Town development, promoted from Division Two West
- Longlevens, promoted from the Gloucestershire County League
- Wantage Town reserves, promoted from Division Two West

=== League table ===
Pos	Team	Pld	W	D	L	GF	GA	GD	Pts	Promotion
1	Longlevens	28	22	2	4	96	38	+58	68	Promoted to the Premier Division
2	Tuffley Rovers	27	19	5	3	71	28	+43	62	Promoted to the Premier Division
3	Lydney Town	28	19	3	6	84	32	+52	60	Promoted to the Premier Division
4	Cirencester Town development	28	15	5	8	91	58	+33	50	
5	Hook Norton	28	14	6	8	56	49	+7	48	
6	Purton	28	13	4	11	43	48	−5	43	
7	North Leigh United	28	14	4	10	75	47	+28	42 (Note: North Leigh United were deducted three points for fielding an ineligible player against Wantage Town Reserves on 23 August, and a further point for the same offence against Cirencester Town Development on 6 September.)	
8	Shortwood United reserves	28	12	5	11	62	57	+5	41	
9	Clanfield	28	9	6	13	38	53	−15	33	
10	Carterton	27	7	6	14	55	73	−18	27	
11	Wantage Town reserves	28	7	4	17	44	85	−41	25	Transferred to Division One East
12	New College Swindon	28	7	3	18	38	66	−28	24	
13	Letcombe	28	6	6	16	28	57	−29	24	
14	Fairford Town	28	5	6	17	45	76	−31	21	
15	Tytherington Rocks	28	5	5	18	36	95	−59	20	

Source: fchd
Rules for classification: 1) points; 2) goal difference; 3) number of goals scored.

=== Results ===
Home \ Away	CAR	CIT	CLA	FAI	HON	LET	LLV	LYD	NCS	NLU	PUR	SHU	TUF	TYT	WAN
Carterton		4–2	1–2	3–3	2–4	0–1	2–6	1–2	2–1	1–5	5–1	1–1	1–6	9–1	5–4
Cirencester Town Development	6–2		4–2	2–1	4–0	4–0	2–2	4–3	4–0	2–2	5–0	2–3	1–1	7–2	4–2
Clanfield	1–5	2–1		3–2	0–0	1–0	0–4	0–1	2–1	0–0	0–2	0–0	2–2	1–3	6–0
Fairford Town	1–1	4–4	1–2		3–4	3–2	1–2	1–2	2–3	0–3	1–1	5–4	0–1	5–0	3–3
Hook Norton	1–1	3–2	4–0	4–1		2–2	1–3	1–7	0–3	5–1	1–0	4–1	3–1	5–1	4–0
Letcombe	0–0	2–1	1–1	0–2	0–1		1–2	1–1	1–3	2–3	3–2	3–1	0–4	2–0	1–1
Longlevens	3–1	2–1	3–1	8–0	4–1	4–0		3–3	4–2	4–3	2–0	5–2	1–2	7–0	6–1
Lydney Town	6–1	3–2	1–0	4–0	3–0	5–0	4–0		9–1	3–0	5–2	2–0	0–1	4–1	2–1
New College Swindon	3–2	1–2	0–2	0–2	0–1	0–0	0–4	1–0		0–4	0–4	6–1	0–2	2–2	5–0
North Leigh United	6–1	6–3	7–0	4–0	1–1	7–0	4–2	0–3	1–0		1–2	2–2	2–5	6–0	2–1
Purton	2–1	2–3	2–0	2–1	0–0	2–1	0–2	3–2	3–1	2–1		1–0	1–1	2–1	4–2
Shortwood United Res.	1–2	2–3	3–2	3–1	0–0	3–1	3–1	4–2	6–2	2–0	3–1		1–1	6–2	1–3
Tuffley Rovers	– (Note: Tuffley Rovers v Carterton not played (abandoned after 63 minutes).)	2–2	2–1	4–0	5–1	3–2	1–2	2–1	3–1	4–1	3–0	1–2		1–0	9–1
Tytherington Rocks	0–0	1–6	1–1	2–2	1–3	1–0	1–7	1–5	3–2	1–3	2–2	3–2	2–3		4–1
Wantage Town reserves	4–1	4–8	2–6	5–0	3–2	0–2	1–3	1–1	0–0	1–0	1–0	1–5	0–1	1–0	

Updated to match(es) played on 21 April 2015. Source: Hellenic League
Legend: Blue = home team win; Yellow = draw; Red = away team win.

== Division Two East ==
Hellenic Football League Division Two East
- Season: 2014–15
- Champions: Stokenchurch
- Matches: 110
- Goals: 428 (3.89 per match)

Division Two East featured eleven clubs which competed in the division last season, along with two new clubs:

- Flackwell Heath reserves
- Stokenchurch

=== League table ===
Pos	Team	Pld	W	D	L	GF	GA	GD	Pts	Qualification
1	Stokenchurch	20	13	4	3	60	29	+31	43	
2	Penn & Tylers Green reserves	20	13	2	5	52	29	+23	41	
3	Flackwell Heath reserves	20	13	2	5	45	34	+11	41	
4	Ascot United reserves	20	10	3	7	40	30	+10	33	
5	Chinnor reserves	20	9	3	8	33	42	−9	30	
6	Thame United reserves	20	8	5	7	31	32	−1	29	
7	Bracknell Town reserves	20	7	3	10	37	38	−1	24	
8	Rayners Lane reserves	20	5	4	11	30	36	−6	19	Resigned from the league
9	Holyport reserves	20	5	4	11	42	52	−10	18 (Note: Holyport Reserves were deducted one point for fielding an ineligible player against Chinnor Reserves on 6 September.)	
10	Finchampstead reserves	20	5	2	13	23	56	−33	17	Resigned from the league
11	Wokingham & Emmbrook reserves	20	4	4	12	35	50	−15	16	
12	Henley Town reserves	0	0	0	0	0	0	0	0 (Note: Henley Town Reserves resigned on 23 February 2015, and Chalfont Wasps Reserves resigned on 28 February 2015. Both clubs' results were expunged.)	Withdrew, records expunged
13	Chalfont Wasps reserves	0	0	0	0	0	0	0	0	Withdrew, records expunged

Source: fchd
Rules for classification: 1) points; 2) goal difference; 3) number of goals scored.

== Division Two West ==
Hellenic Football League Division Two West
- Season: 2014–15
- Champions: Oxford City Nomads development
- Matches: 131
- Goals: 632 (4.82 per match)

Division Two West featured nine clubs which competed in the division last season, along with four new clubs:

- Abingdon United reserves, joined from the North Berks League
- Clanfield reserves, joined from the North Berks League
- Kidlington reserves, joined from the Oxfordshire Senior League
- Letcombe reserves

=== League table ===
Pos	Team	Pld	W	D	L	GF	GA	GD	Pts	Qualification
1	Oxford City Nomads development	21	18	0	3	88	29	+59	54	
2	Kidlington reserves	22	16	1	5	70	42	+28	49	
3	Abingdon United reserves	22	15	0	7	84	47	+37	45	Resigned from the league
4	Old Woodstock Town reserves	21	13	2	6	49	39	+10	41	
5	Brimscombe & Thrupp reserves	22	12	2	8	64	49	+15	38	
6	Fairford Town reserves	22	10	5	7	45	37	+8	35	
7	Highworth Town reserves	22	10	4	8	51	42	+9	34	
8	Wootton Bassett Town reserves	22	7	6	9	71	56	+15	27	Resigned from the league
9	Clanfield reserves	22	5	2	15	26	68	−42	17	
10	Hook Norton reserves	22	3	7	12	28	51	−23	16	
11	Letcombe reserves	22	5	0	17	29	88	−59	15	
12	Shrivenham reserves	22	2	1	19	27	84	−57	7	
13	Cheltenham Saracens reserves	0	0	0	0	0	0	0	0 (Note: Cheltenham Saracens Reserves resigned on 28 February 2015. Their results were expunged.)	Withdrew, record expunged

Source: fchd
Rules for classification: 1) points; 2) goal difference; 3) number of goals scored.
Notes:
- Five games were not played: Old Woodstock Town Reserves v Oxford City Nomads Development (abandoned, no replay); Oxford City Nomads Development v Clanfield Reserves (home win awarded); Fairford Town Reserves v Hook Norton Reserves (home win awarded); Abingdon United Reserves v Fairford Town Reserves (away win awarded); Oxford City Nomads Development v Shrivenham Reserves (home win awarded).
