= Ben Gladwin =

English footballer

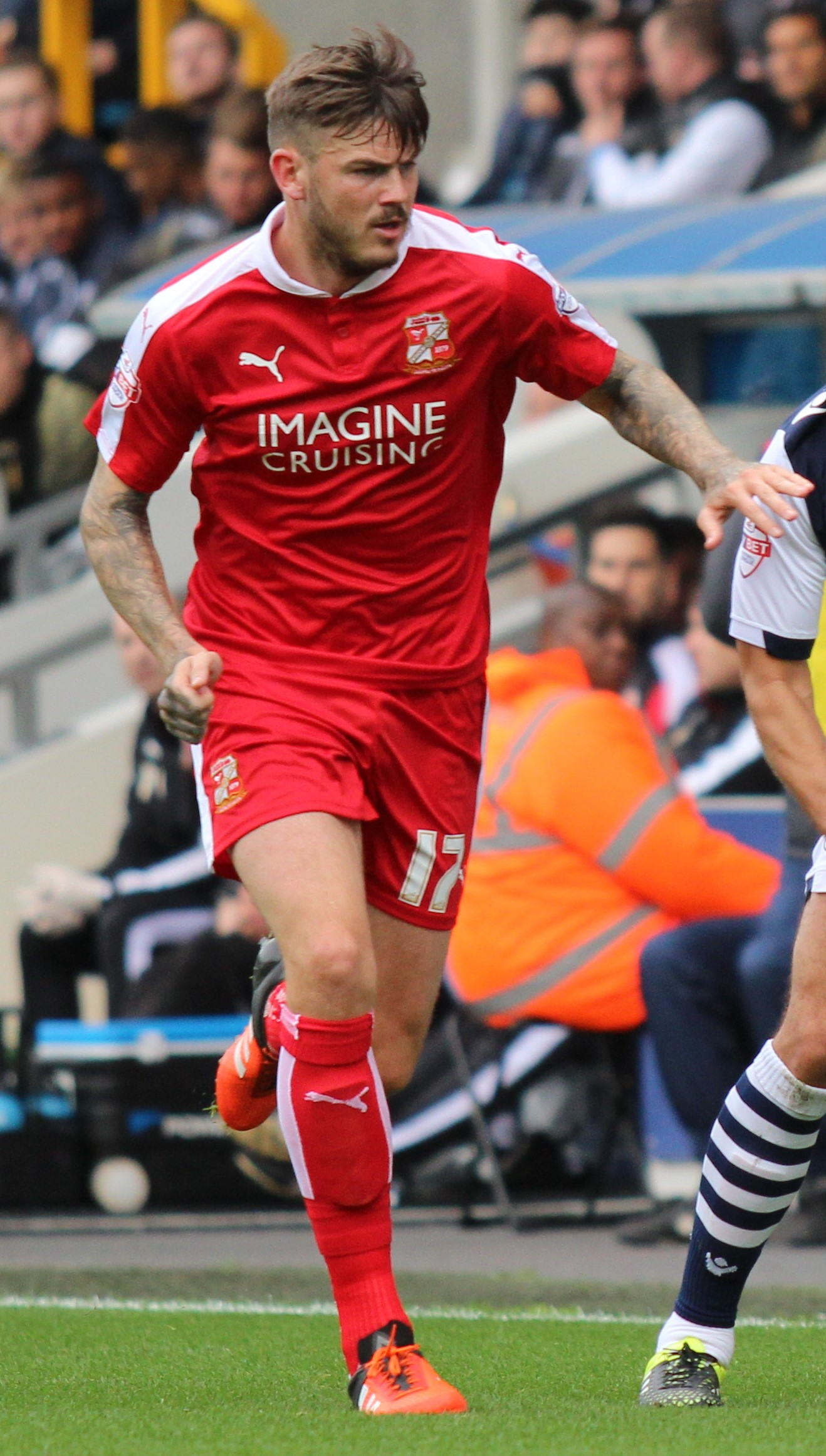
- Gladwin with Swindon Town in 2015

Personal information
- Full name: Benjamin Thomas Charles Gladwin
- Date of birth: 8 June 1992 (age 34)
- Place of birth: Reading, England
- Height: 1.90 m (6 ft 3 in)
- Position: Midfielder

Team information
- Current team: Al-Hital (assistant)

Youth career
- 2001–2005: Reading
- 2005–2006: Eldon Celtic
- 2006–2009: Aldershot Town

Senior career*
Years	Team	Apps	(Gls)
2009–2010	AFC Wallingford	22	(6)
2010	Salisbury City		
2010–2011	Windsor & Eton (Note: Gladwin made two appearances for Windsor & Eton in the 2010–2011 Southern League Premier Division; however these matches were expunged when the club folded before the end of the season)	0	(0)
2011	Burnham	16	(1)
2011–2012	Hayes & Yeading United	2	(0)
2012	Reading Town	14	(6)
2012–2013	Marlow	19	(8)
2013	Hayes & Yeading United	4	(0)
2013	Marlow	21	(11)
2013–2015	Swindon Town	47	(8)
2015–2017	Queens Park Rangers	14	(0)
2015–2016	→ Swindon Town (loan)	13	(2)
2016	→ Bristol City (loan)	1	(0)
2017	→ Swindon Town (loan)	18	(2)
2017–2020	Blackburn Rovers	5	(0)
2020–2021	Milton Keynes Dons	35	(3)
2021–2023	Swindon Town	59	(6)
2023–2024	Crawley Town	27	(3)
Total		317	(56)

Managerial career
- 2024: Crawley Town (caretaker)
- 2025: Milton Keynes Dons (caretaker)
- * Club domestic league appearances and goals

Benjamin Thomas Charles Gladwin (born 8 June 1992) is an English former footballer who played as a midfielder.

Gladwin has played for 12 clubs including Swindon Town (three previous spells), Queens Park Rangers, Blackburn Rovers, Milton Keynes Dons and Crawley Town.

== Career ==
=== Swindon Town ===
Gladwin began at Reading's academy, and after being released played youth football with Eldon Celtic and Aldershot Town. He began his senior career in North Berks League Division One with AFC Wallingford, winning their Player of the Season award in his first campaign aged just 17. He then spent time playing for various non-League football teams such as Salisbury City and Hayes & Yeading United, before moving into professional football when Swindon Town signed the midfielder from Marlow in November 2013.

Gladwin made his debut for Swindon on 10 December 2013, in a 1–1 draw at home to Stevenage in the EFL Trophy. His first goal for the club came the following season, in a 3–2 loss against Plymouth Argyle in the same competition. On 14 April 2015, Gladwin scored a first-half hat-trick in a 4–2 win away to Rochdale. On 11 May 2015, Gladwin scored twice in Swindon's 5–5 draw with Sheffield United in the Football League play-offs, but Swindon went on to lose in the final 4–0 against Preston North End.

=== Queens Park Rangers ===
On 28 May 2015, Gladwin and Swindon Town teammate Massimo Luongo, joined Queens Park Rangers, both players signing on a three-year deal for an undisclosed fee. On 11 August 2015, Gladwin made his competitive QPR debut in a 3–0 win against Yeovil Town in the first round of the 2015–16 Football League Cup. Gladwin would go on to make 17 appearances for the club in all competitions over two seasons, and had multiple spells out on loan during his time at the club.

He returned to Swindon Town on an initial 28-day loan on 9 October 2015, and returned to QPR on 7 January 2016. He scored twice in 13 games during this loan. On 19 January, he joined Bristol City on a 93-day loan, but made just one appearance for the club.

On 10 January 2017, Gladwin moved to Swindon Town for a second loan spell until the end of the season. He scored twice in 18 appearances during this loan.

=== Blackburn Rovers ===
On 28 June 2017, Gladwin joined League One side Blackburn Rovers on a two-year deal. In November 2017, Gladwin suffered an injury for which he required surgery that ruled him out of play until February 2018. On 2 January 2020 he was released by Blackburn. During his time at Blackburn, he made just 11 appearances and did not start a league game amidst persistent injury problems with his knee.

=== Milton Keynes Dons ===
Gladwin signed for Milton Keynes Dons on 10 January 2020 on a short-term deal. Despite several positive performances, he was initially one of nine players released by the club after the conclusion of the 2019–20 season. However, on 28 July 2020 the club announced Gladwin had returned and re-signed ahead of the 2020–21 campaign.

=== Swindon Town return ===
Gladwin returned to Swindon Town on 26 July 2021 on a free transfer signing a one-year contract. On 20 January 2022, Gladwin signed a new contract to keep him at the club beyond the end of the season.

=== Crawley Town ===
On 27 January 2023, Gladwin signed for Crawley Town for an undisclosed fee on an eighteen-month contract. After helping Crawley win promotion in the 2023-24 season, Gladwin retired from playing, citing his ongoing knee issues, and joined the club's coaching staff.

== Coaching career ==
On 26 September 2024, Gladwin was appointed Crawley Town caretaker manager, following the departure of Scott Lindsey.

On 4 October 2024, Gladwin followed Lindsey to another of his former clubs, joining Milton Keynes Dons as first-team coach. In March 2025, following the sacking of Lindsey, Gladwin was appointed interim manager.

In August 2025, he joined the academy coaching staff at Wycombe Wanderers.

== Career statistics ==
As of end of 2023–24 season

Appearances and goals by club, season and competition
Club	Season	League			FA Cup		League Cup		Other		Total	
Club	Season	Division	Apps	Goals	Apps	Goals	Apps	Goals	Apps	Goals	Apps	Goals
AFC Wallingford	2009–10	North Berks League Division One	17	5	—		—		7	1	24	6
AFC Wallingford	2010–11	North Berks League Division One	5	1	—		—		2 (Note: One appearance in North Berks Cup; one appearance in North Berks Charity Shield)	0	7	1
AFC Wallingford	Total		22	6	—		—		9	1	31	7
Windsor & Eton	2010–11	Southern League Premier Division	—		—		—		—		0	0
Burnham	2010–11	Southern League Division One Central	12	1	—		—		—		12	1
Burnham	2011–12	Southern League Division One Central	4	0	4	0	—		2 (Note: Appearance(s) in FA Trophy)	0	10	0
Burnham	Total		16	1	4	0	—		2	0	22	1
Hayes & Yeading United	2011–12	Conference Premier	2	0	—		—		0	0	2	0
Reading Town	2011–12	Hellenic League Premier Division	14	6	—		—		5 (Note: Four appearances three goals in Hellenic League Supplementary Cup; one appearance one goal in Berks & Bucks Senior Cup)	4	19	10
Hayes & Yeading United	2012–13	Conference South	4	0	—		—		1 (Note: Appearance(s) in Middlesex Senior Cup)	0	5	0
Marlow	2012–13 (Note: Gladwin played for Marlow in two separate spells during the 2012–13 season)	Hellenic League Premier Division	25	12	4	0	—		6 (Note: Two appearances in FA Vase; three appearances in Hellenic League Challenge Cup; one appearance in Berks & Bucks Senior Cup)	0	35	12
Marlow	2013–14	Southern League Division One Central	15	7	1	0	—		5 (Note: Three appearances four goals in FA Trophy; one appearance one goal in Southern League Cup; one appearance in Berks & Bucks Senior Cup)	5	21	12
Marlow	Total		40	19	5	0	—		11	5	56	24
Swindon Town	2013–14	League One	13	0	—		—		3 (Note: Appearance(s) in Football League Trophy)	0	16	0
Swindon Town	2014–15	League One	34	8	1	0	2	0	4 (Note: One appearance one goal in Football League Trophy; three appearances two goals in League One play-offs)	3	41	11
Swindon Town	Total		47	8	1	0	2	0	7	3	57	11
Queens Park Rangers	2015–16	Championship	7	0	1	0	1	0	—		9	0
Queens Park Rangers	2016–17	Championship	7	0	1	0	0	0	—		8	0
Queens Park Rangers	Total		14	0	2	0	1	0	—		17	0
Swindon Town (loan)	2015–16	League One	13	2	0	0	—		—		13	2
Bristol City (loan)	2015–16	Championship	1	0	—		—		—		1	0
Swindon Town (loan)	2016–17	League One	18	2	—		—		—		18	2
Blackburn Rovers	2017–18	League One	5	0	1	0	2	0	3	0	11	0
Blackburn Rovers	2018–19	Championship	0	0	0	0	0	0	—		0	0
Blackburn Rovers	2019–20	Championship	0	0	—		0	0	—		0	0
Blackburn Rovers	Total		5	0	1	0	2	0	3	0	11	0
Milton Keynes Dons	2019–20	League One	9	1	—		—		—		9	1
Milton Keynes Dons	2020–21	League One	26	2	2	0	0	0	2	0	30	2
Milton Keynes Dons	Total		35	3	2	0	0	0	2	0	39	3
Swindon Town	2021–22	League Two	36	5	3	0	0	0	2 (Note: Appearance(s) in League Two play-offs)	0	41	5
Swindon Town	2022–23	League Two	23	1	0	0	0	0	0	0	23	1
Swindon Town	Total		59	6	3	0	0	0	2	0	64	6
Crawley Town	2022–23	League Two	14	1	—		—		—		14	1
Crawley Town	2023–24	League Two	13	2	1	0	—		—		14	2
Crawley Town	Total		27	3	1	0	0	0	0	0	28	2
Career total			391	46	19	0	5	0	36	9	451	28

== Honours ==
Reading Town

- Hellenic League Supplementary Cup: 2011–12

Marlow

- Hellenic League Premier Division: 2012–13

Blackburn Rovers

- EFL League One second-place promotion: 2017–18

Individual

- AFC Wallingford Player of the Year: 2009–10
