= Royal Wootton Bassett Town F.C. =

English football club in Royal Wootton Bassett, Wiltshire

Coordinates: 51°32′43.48″N 1°53′46.44″W

Royal Wootton Bassett Town
- Full name: Royal Wootton Bassett Town Football Club
- Nickname: Bassett
- Founded: November 1882 (Re-founded in June 1930 after folding in 1908)
- Ground: New Gerard Buxton Sports Ground, Brinkworth Road, Royal Wootton Bassett, Swindon, Wiltshire, SN4 8DS
- Chairman: Paul Gerrish
- Manager: Jonny Aitkenhead
- League: Premier League (Eng)
- Website: https://rwbtfc.co.uk/
Home colours	Away colours

Royal Wootton Bassett Town Football Club are an English football club based in the town of Royal Wootton Bassett in Wiltshire.

The club has two senior men's, one ladies, two veterans, 20 youth and mini soccer and three girls teams, and is affiliated to the Wiltshire County Football Association. The record match attendance was 2,103 versus Swindon Town in July 1991. The club's men's first team are currently members of the Hellenic League Premier Division at level nine of the English football league system.

== History ==
Situated in the small market town six miles west of Swindon, Royal Wootton Bassett Town have been playing football since their establishment in November 1882, making the club one of the oldest in the county of Wiltshire. From 1930, when the club was reformed after a two decade hiatus, until 2013, Bassett played at the Gerard Buxton Sports Ground at Rylands Way. The ground was donated by local dignitary Major Gerard Buxton for sporting activities within the town and opened in May 1930. Since 2015 they have played at the New Gerard Buxton Sports Ground on the outskirts of the town.

After one season in the Vale of the White Horse League, Bassett entered the Swindon & District League in 1899. Progress made there culminated in the side entering the Wiltshire County League in 1903–04, a year after the club reached the finals of both the Advertiser Cup and the Wiltshire Senior Cup.

Bassett made the final of the Wiltshire Senior Cup again during its first year playing at county level, but lost to Swindon Town Reserves.

At the time, the County League featured clubs such as Melksham Town, Devizes Town and Chippenham Town as well as – from further afield – Bath City and Yeovil Casuals (now Yeovil Town). Bassett had mixed fortunes during its spell in this division, coming last in 1904/05 before finishing runners-up a year later. During this period, the club's home games took place at 'The Close', upon which Tanners Close now stands, whilst they were based at the Royal Oak public house.

Bassett resigned from the Wiltshire County League in the summer of 1908 after failing to comply with league regulations which insisted players must reside within a specific radius of the town – the majority of the Bassett side at the time lived in Swindon, while financial pressures meant the club would fold.

Years in the wilderness followed, thanks partly to the First World War – during which The Royal Oak was used as a barracks for German prisoners of war – and the presence of the 1920–21 FA Amateur Cup finalists Swindon Victoria, who for many years played in the town.

However, owing to the opening of the Gerard Buxton Sports Ground in May 1930 and the desire for it to have tenants alongside the town cricket club, the football club was revived. Starting in the Calne & District League, Bassett had much early success, finishing runners-up in 1930/31 before going on to win the league on three occasions. The division featured teams from numerous surrounding villages such as Clyffe Pypard, Bushton and Lyneham.

Re-election to the now expanded Wiltshire League followed, but Bassett struggled to compete with the likes of Westbury United, Devizes and Purton.

Fortunes began to change following the Second World War, and Bassett twice came close to reaching the first round proper of the FA Amateur Cup: in the 1946–47 season it was the last Wiltshire club standing, but was beaten 9–0 by Cornish side St Austell in the final qualifying round.

Bassett steadily rose up the Wiltshire League Division One table during the 1950s. After narrowly missing out on the title two seasons earlier, they were crowned as champions in 1958–59. A year later, now playing in the Wiltshire Premier Division, Bassett enjoyed another successful season, embarking on a nine-game FA Amateur Cup run that saw them again fall one game short of reaching the first round proper.

The club generally found the going tough in its new league surroundings. They were up against strong opposition, which included numerous clubs from outside the county, namely Somerset sides Paulton Rovers, Radstock Town, Frome Town, Clandown and Peasedown Athletic, as well as Stonehouse Town from Gloucestershire.

Restructuring of the County League came at the end of the 1960s. This saw Bassett enter the Wiltshire Combination and pitted them against more local sides. During the eight years of this competition, Bassett's best finish was fifth in 1969–70.

In 1976, the Wiltshire County Football League was established after another reorganisation of the game in the county. Bassett were placed in Division One but lasted two seasons before being relegated. They secured promotion a year later, but immediately went back down in 1979–80.

Steady progress eventually led to Bassett winning the Division Two title in 1984–85. In Division One, under the stewardship of Micky Woolford, Bassett won the league and promotion to the Hellenic League in 1987–88. That same year they again finished runners-up in the final of the Wiltshire Senior Cup, losing 1–0 to Purton.

Woolford remained manager until 1995, overseeing a spell in which Bassett established themselves in Hellenic League Division One. During this period Bassett reached the final of the Hellenic League Division One Cup three times, winning it twice, in 1989/90 and 1993/94.

Bassett won their first County Cup title in 1998–99, beating Pewsey Vale 3–2 after extra time in the final held at the County Ground. A year later they gained promotion to the Hellenic League Premier Division, having finished third in Division One.

In their first season in the Premier Division, Bassett secured a mid-table position, and also won the Wiltshire Senior Cup for a second time by defeating Shrewton United 2–0. A year later the club reached the first round of the FA Vase for the first time, losing at home to Cornish side St Blazey. However, in the league Bassett became involved in numerous relegation battles, eventually falling back to Division One West after finishing 21st in the 2004/05 season.

Bassett came close to securing an immediate return to the Hellenic Premier Division in 2005/06, following a three-month unbeaten spell from the end of January. However, a 1–0 defeat at Trowbridge Town in the penultimate game of the year saw Bassett finish fifth in Division One West, one point shy of third place and a promotion spot.

Underachievement followed during the next two years, although season 2007/08 saw Bassett advance to the first qualifying round of the FA Cup after wins over local rivals Highworth Town and Southern League side Bracknell Town.

A 15th-place finish in that season was Bassett's lowest ever in the Hellenic League, but a year later they were again battling for promotion and having cup success. Bassett went further than ever before in the FA Vase, reaching the second round proper, where they were defeated 4–0 at 1992 winners Wimborne Town. Throughout the year, Bassett were promotion candidates, but defeat at Trowbridge late in the season meant they finished fourth.

A return to the Hellenic Premier Division was finally achieved in 2009/10 as Bassett finished runners-up to Slimbridge on goal difference after losing three league games all season.

They enjoyed another FA Cup run in the 2010–11 season. Bradford Town were beaten 4–3 on penalties in a replay. In the preliminary round Bassett defeated Western League side Almondsbury UWE 1–0 to reach the first qualifying round for the second time in the club's history. They were knocked out at that stage, however, by Hamble ASSC in another replay.

In the league Bassett enjoyed a good start, defeating eventual champions Wantage Town in September. They soon became engaged in a battle against relegation though and wound up finishing 15th. The club were eventually demoted after Rylands Way was deemed not to have met ground grading criteria.

Back in Division One West for the 2011–12 season, Bassett hoped to challenge for promotion. Despite an up and down campaign this was still a possibility late in the season before they wound up fifth.

2012-13, Bassett's final season at Rylands Way, would see them secure a return to the Hellenic League Premier Division, as they came runners-up behind Brimscombe & Thrupp in Division One West. Manager Dave Turner, who stood down at the end of the campaign, also led the team to the second qualifying round of the FA Cup, where Bassett were defeated by Conference South side Dorchester Town.

The 2013–14 season, under the guidance of new manager Jeff Roberts, was the first of two seasons Bassett played at Cirencester Town's Corinium Stadium ground as part of a groundshare while work on its new ground took place. The following season, with Paul Braithwaite now first team manager, Bassett finished 11th in the Hellenic League Premier Division – the club's highest ever league placing.

On 1 July 2015 the club changed its name from Wootton Bassett Town, incorporating 'Royal' into its name to reflect the royal patronage granted to the town in 2011. This name change coincided with the team returning to play their first game at the New Gerard Buxton Sports Ground, Royal Wootton Bassett Sports Association's new facility on the edge of the town. In their first two seasons at their new ground, they finished 15th and 11th in the Hellenic League Premier Division.

Over the last decade and a half the club has expanded, with the establishment of a large Youth Section and a Ladies Section. The club now operates 24 teams from Under 8s upwards. This growth led to the club being awarded Charter Development Club status by the FA before this was upgraded to Community Club status. Bassett were the first club in Wiltshire to achieve this. International ties have also been established, with three youth section teams touring Holland annually. This has led to a relationship with amateur side FC 's-Gravenzande, who are based near The Hague.

== Ground ==
Since 2015, Royal Wootton Bassett Town play at the New Gerard Buxton Sports Ground, Brinkworth Road. The sports ground also has facilities for tennis, cricket and pétanque, as well as a bar and social area.

== Honours ==
=== League honours ===
- Hellenic Football League Division One West :
  - Runners-up (2): 2009–10, 2012–13
- Wiltshire Football League Division One :
  - Champions (1): 1987–88
- Wiltshire Football League Division Two :
  - Champions (1): 1984–85
  - Runners-up (1): 1978–79
- Wiltshire League Division One:
  - Champions (1): 1958–59
- Wiltshire County League:
  - Runners-up (1): 1905–06
- Calne & District League:
  - Champions (3): 1931–32, 1934–35, 1935–36
  - Runners-up (1): 1930–31
- Wiltshire Football League Division Four:
  - Runners-up (1): 1982–83

=== Cup honours ===
- Wiltshire County FA Senior Cup:
  - Winners (2): 1998–99, 2000–01
  - Runners-up (3): 1902–03, 1903–04, 1987–88
- Hellenic Football League Division One Cup :
  - Winners (2): 1989–90, 1993–94
  - Runners-up (1): 1994–95
- Wiltshire Football League Senior Cup:
  - Winners (1): 1983–84
- Wiltshire Football League Subsidiary Cup:
  - Winners (1): 1978–79
- Wiltshire Football League Junior Cup:
  - Runners-up (3): 1984–85, 1988–89, 2012–13
- Calne & District League Cup:
  - Winners (1): 1934–35
  - Runners-up (1): 1935–36
- Brotherhood Cup:
  - Winners (1): 1938–39
- Vale of the White Horse Cup:
  - Winners (2): 1933–34, 1953–54
  - Runners-up (1): 1951–52
- Advertiser Cup:
  - Runners-Up (2): 1902–03, 1904–05
- Gordon Perrett Memorial Cup:
  - Winners (1): 2016–17

== Records ==
- FA Cup Best performance – Second qualifying round 2012–13, 2020–21
- FA Vase Best performance – Third round 2021–22, 2022–23, 2023–24
- FA Amateur Cup Best performance – Third qualifying round 1946–47, 1959–60
- FA Youth Cup Best performance – Second qualifying round 2003–04, 2005–06
- FA Women's Cup Best performance - Third qualifying round 2022–23, 2023-24, 2024-25

== Hellenic League seasons ==
Year	Division	Position	P	W	D	L	F	A	Pts	Notes
1988–89	Division One	5/15	28	11	7	10	50	41	40	
1989–90	Division One	7/16	30	13	8	9	52	35	47	Hellenic League Division One Cup Winners
1990–91	Division One	8/16	30	11	8	11	32	36	41	
1991–92	Division One	12/17	32	10	8	14	45	59	38	
1992–93	Division One	12/16	30	8	6	16	40	53	30	
1993–94	Division One	9/18	34	15	8	11	65	57	53	Hellenic League Division One Cup Winners
1994–95	Division One	9/20	38	18	5	15	67	68	59	Hellenic League Division One Cup Runners-up
1995–96	Division One	10/18	34	12	9	13	50	64	45	
1996–97	Division One	11/17	32	9	8	15	37	50	35	
1997–98	Division One	10/17	32	12	6	14	67	58	42	
1998–99	Division One	5/17	32	17	7	8	64	43	58	Wiltshire Senior Cup Winners
1999-00	Division One	3/15	28	15	7	6	54	32	52	Promoted
2000–01	Premier Division	13/20	38	14	10	14	54	60	52	Wiltshire Senior Cup Winners
2001–02	Premier Division	19/22	42	11	9	22	39	75	42	
2002–03	Premier Division	15/21	40	10	10	20	36	70	40	
2003–04	Premier Division	16/22	42	11	5	26	38	73	38	
2004–05	Premier Division	21/22	42	6	9	27	30	85	27	Relegated
2005–06	Division One West	5/18	34	17	10	7	58	30	61	
2006–07	Division One West	11/18	34	14	5	15	64	62	47	
2007–08	Division One West	15/18	34	11	3	20	43	66	36	
2008–09	Division One West	4/17	32	17	9	6	61	30	60	
2009–10	Division One West	2/16	30	20	7	3	74	34	67	Promoted as Division One West Runners-up
2010–11	Premier Division	15/22	42	13	7	22	55	87	46	Relegated (Demoted)
2011–12	Division One West	5/17	32	15	7	10	69	47	52	
2012–13	Division One West	2/16	30	22	3	5	75	40	69	Promoted as Division One West Runners-up
2013–14	Premier Division	14/20	38	11	12	15	60	60	45	
2014-15	Premier Division	11/20	38	14	9	15	66	78	51	
2015-16	Premier Division	15/20	38	12	5	21	50	86	41	
2016-17	Premier Division	11/18	34	15	3	16	61	64	45*	3 points deducted
2017-18	Premier Division	15/20	38	11	6	21	44	85	39	
2018-19	Premier Division	10/19	36	14	7	15	66	71	49	
2019-20	Premier Division	16/19	27	8	4	15	50	65	28	Season curtailed
2020-21	Premier Division	15/18	8	1	4	3	8	12	7	Season curtailed
2021-22	Premier Division	12/20	38	16	6	16	58	66	54	
2022-23	Premier Division	5/20	38	19	8	11	67	50	65	
2023-24	Premier Division	4/20	38	23	4	11	65	50	73	Lost promotion playoff final
2024-25	Premier Division	7/20	38	19	7	12	78	58	64	
2025-26	Premier Division	16/20	38	10	9	19	51	77	39	
