= Reading Town F.C. =

Association football club in England

Reading Town
- Full name: Reading Town Football Club
- Nickname: The Town
- Founded: 1966; 60 years ago (as Lower Burghfield)
- Dissolved: 2016; 10 years ago
- Ground: Scours Lane, Reading, Berkshire
- Capacity: 2,000 (162 seated)
- Chairman: Natalie Newby
- Manager: Tranell Richardson
- 2014–15: Hellenic League; Premier Division, 17th
Home colours	Away colours	Third colours

Reading Town Football Club were a semi-professional English football club in the Hellenic League Division One East, based in Reading, Berkshire. It was affiliated to the Berks & Bucks Football Association.

The club previously played in the Combined Counties Football League, but with the agreement of the leagues involved, swapped places with Badshot Lea in time for the start of the 2008–09 season.

== History ==
The club was formed in 1966 as Lower Burghfield and started life in the Reading Combination League. In the early 1980s they were the Premier Division Champions on four occasions, with the 1983–84 season seeing them not just win the league, but three league cup competitions too. The next season saw them move to the Reading & District League where they finished as runners-up in the Premier Division and went on to win the Reading Senior Cup. The 1985–86 season saw them once again finish as runners-up in the Premier Division, but this time around they had to settle for runners-up in the Reading Senior Cup. During their time in the Reading leagues the club changed its name several times, being known as XL United, Vincents United and finally Reading Garage.

In 1989–90 they joined the Premier Division of the Chiltonian League, and changed their name from Reading Garage to I T S Reading. In 1993–94 they changed their name to Reading Town and relocated to their final home of Scours Lane. The 1994–95 season saw the team win the Premier Division Championship, and gain promotion to the Combined Counties Football League. Their first season in the Combined counties league the club finished midtable but went on to win the Berks & Bucks FA Senior Trophy, beating Lambourn Sports in the final. Floodlights were installed the following season and the team reached the final of the Berks & Bucks FA Senior Trophy again, but were beaten in final by Abingdon United. That season also saw the club enter the FA Vase for the first time, where they reached the 4th Round, before succumbing to beaten semi-finalists Banstead Athletic.

The 1997–98 campaign saw the club finish as runners-up in the league, losing out to Ashford Town. That season also saw them enter the FA Cup for the first time in their history, entering at the preliminary qualification round, where they were knocked out by Waterlooville. At the start of 2001–02 season Town appointed former Manchester United and England star Neil Webb as Manager. However Webb was unable to transfer his success as a player to the management role and after a poor start to the season he resigned in November.

Twenty-three-year-old Colin Millard was made the manager for the 2002–03 campaign Town, and stayed with the club until the end of the 2006–07 to become Assistant manager at Bracknell Town. The club then appointed Neil Goff and Glenn Goudie as joint managers of the club for the 2007–08 season. Goff was the former assistant manager of Reading Town when Millard was in charge; Goudie's previous role at the club was the goalkeeping and defensive coach, he was also the former manager of Royal Mail FC in the Reading Football League. In September 2007 Millard resigned as Assistant Manager at Bracknell Town and was re-appointed as Manager, with Goudie and Goff reverting to the position of Joint Assistant Managers.

In June 2008 Reading Town moved across leagues to join the Premier Division of the Hellenic Football League. The first season in the new league saw the club finish eighth, and win the Berks & Bucks Senior Trophy again, when they beat Newport Pagnell Town in the final 2–0. The next season saw the club become runners-up of the Hellenic League Floodlit Cup and the Berks & Bucks Senior Trophy, but gained some consolation by winning the Southern Combination Cup for the first time.

At the end of season Colin Millard resigned and was replaced by former Henley Town boss Roddy Slater. Roddy's stint in charge lasted only one season and he resigned at the end of 2010–11 to be succeeded by Mark Bartley. Under Mark Bartley the club went on to win the Hellenic League Supplementary cup, beating Highmoor Ibis 4–3 in the final. At the end of the season Bartley resigned due to not wanting to work on a smaller budget for the following season. Michael Butcher was appointed as Bartleys replacement but only lasted till January 2013 when he quit as manager and former manager Colin Millard took over. In June 2013 Millard's appointment was made permanent.

In February 2016, Reading Town were closed down by owners Battersea and Wandsworth TUC.

== Stadium ==
Scours Lane

Reading Town played their home games at Scours Lane Stadium, in the Tilehurst area of the town.

The stadium has a capacity of 2,000, of which 162 is covered seating. The record attendance for a Reading Town game is 1,067 against AFC Wimbledon at Scours Lane on 3 May 2003.

Scours Lane is the second-highest capacity football stadium in Reading, next to Madejski Stadium, home of EFL League One side Reading. The ground is now used by Reading City F.C.

== Honours ==
=== League honours ===
- Combined Counties Football League Premier Division :
  - Runners up (1): 1997–98
- Chiltonian League Premier Division :
  - Champions (1): 1994–95
- Reading & District League Premier Division :
  - Runners up (2): 1984–85, 1985–86
- Reading Combination League Premier Division :
  - Champions (4): 1980–81, 1981–82, 1982–83, 1983–84

=== Cup honours ===
- Berks & Bucks FA Senior Trophy:
  - Winners (2): 1995–96, 2008–09
  - Runners up (3): 1996–97, 2009–10, 2013–14
- Reading Senior Cup:
  - Winners (1): 1984–85
  - Runners up (1): 1985–86
- Hellenic Football League Floodlit Cup:
  - Runners-up (1): 2009–10
- Hellenic Football League Supplementary Cup:
  - Winners (1): 2011–12
- Southern Combination Cup:
  - Winners (1): 2009–10

== Records ==
- Highest League Position: 2nd in Combined Counties Football League Premier Division 1997–98
- FA Cup best performance: First qualifying round 1999–00, 2000–01
- FA Vase best performance: Fourth round 1996–97, 2011–12
- Highest Attendance: 1,067 Vs AFC Wimbledon 3 May 2003.

== Former players ==
1. Players that have played/managed in the football league or any foreign equivalent to this level (i.e. fully professional league).
2. Players with full international caps.
- (Northern Ireland) Pat McCoy
- (England) Stuart Beavon
- (Bulgaria) Asen Valchev
- (England) George Friel
- (England) Graham Lewis
- (England) Marcus Richardson
- (Sierra Leone) Sam Bangura
- (England) Ben Gladwin
- (England) Jamie Fairchild

== Former coaches ==
1. Managers/Coaches that have played/managed in the football league or any foreign equivalent to this level (i.e. fully professional league).
2. Managers/Coaches with full international caps.
- (England) Neil Webb
