= Cheltenham Saracens F.C. =

Association football club in England

Coordinates: 51°54′32.2056″N 2°5′43.5984″W

Cheltenham Saracens
- Full name: Cheltenham Saracens Football Club
- Nicknames: Saracens, Sarries
- Founded: 1964
- Ground: Petersfield Park, Cheltenham
- Chairman: Graham Roberts
- Manager: Ryan Betteridge
- League: Hellenic League Division One
- 2025–26: Hellenic League Division One, 6th of 18
Home colours	Away colours	Third colours

Cheltenham Saracens Football Club is a football club based in Cheltenham, England. Affiliated to the Gloucestershire County FA, they are currently members of the Hellenic League Division One and play at Petersfield Park.

== History ==
Cheltenham Saracens were established in 1964 as a multi-sports club, with the football team joining Division Five of the Cheltenham League. Following several promotions, the club joined Division One of the Hellenic League in 1986. After winning Division One in 1999–2000, they were promoted to the Premier Division. After finishing bottom of the Premier Division in 2001–02 the club were relegated to Division One West.

In 2010–11 Cheltenham finished third in Division One West, earning promotion to the Premier Division. However, they were relegated back to Division One West at the end of the 2014–15 season after finishing bottom of the Premier Division.

== Honours ==
- Hellenic League
  - Division One champions 1999–2000
- Gloucestershire Primary Challenge Cup
  - Winners 1971–72
- Gloucestershire Senior Amateur Cup
  - Winners 1991–92
- Cheltenham Minor Charities Cup
  - Winners 2009–10

== Records ==
- Highest league position: 11th in Hellenic League Premier Division, 2012–13
- Best FA Cup performance: First qualifying round, 2015–16
- Best FA Vase performance: First round, 2012–13, 2023–24, 2026–27
- Record attendance: 327 vs Harrow Hill, 31 August 2003
