= Fairford Town F.C. =

Association football club in England

Coordinates: 51°42′26.95″N 1°46′03.56″W

Fairford Town
- Full name: Fairford Town Football Club
- Nickname: Town
- Founded: 1891
- Ground: Cinder Lane, Fairford
- Capacity: 2,000
- Chairman: Stuart Pike
- Manager: Ryan Souter
- League: Hellenic League Premier Division
- 2025–26: Hellenic League Premier Division, 7th of 20
- Website: https://fairfordtownfc.co.uk/
Home colours	Away colours

Fairford Town Football Club is a football club based in Fairford, Gloucestershire, England. Affiliated to the Gloucestershire County Football Association, they are currently members of the Hellenic League Premier Division and play at Cinder Lane.

== History ==
The club was established in 1891 and prior to World War II they played in the Cirencester and District League. After the war they switched to the Swindon & District League, going on to win the Premier Division title and Advertiser Cup double in both 1964–65 and 1968–69. In 1970 the club moved up to Division One of the Hellenic League. In their first season in the league, the club finished third, missing out on promotion on goal average, also losing in the Division One Cup final. The following season they were placed in Division One A as league expansion led to there being two Division Ones. The club went on to win the title and the Division One Challenge Shield, earning promotion to the Premier Division.

At the end of the 1973–74 season Fairford were relegated to Division One. However, after finishing as Division One runners-up in 1975–76, they were promoted back to the Premier Division. They finished as runners-up in 1978–79, also winning the Premier Division Cup. They were runners-up again the following season, which also saw them win the Gloucestershire Challenge Trophy. The club finished as Premier Division runners-up for a third time in 1990–91 and won the Gloucestershire Challenge Trophy again in 1998–99. They remained in the Premier Division until finishing second-from-bottom of the division in 2011–12 season, after which they were relegated to Division One West. In 2016–17 the club won Division One West, earning promotion back to the Premier Division.

== Ground ==
The club's Cinder Lane ground is on the eastern edge of the town. It is also the home ground of Swindon Town Women.

== Honours ==
- Hellenic Football
  - Division One A champions 1971–72
  - Premier Division Cup winners 1978–79
  - Division One Challenge Shield winners 1971–72
  - Division One West champions 2016–17
  - Supplementary Cup winners 2015–16
- Swindon & District League
  - Premier Division champions 1964–65, 1968–69
  - Advertiser Cup winners 1964–65, 1968–69
- Gloucestershire Challenge Trophy
  - Winners 1979–80, 1998–99, 2024-25
- Gloucestershire Junior Cup
  - Winners 1962–63

== Records ==
- Best FA Cup performance: First qualifying round, 2004–05, 2005–06, 2006–07, 2008–09, 2020–21, 2025–26
- Best FA Vase performance: Second round, 1977–78, 1979–80, 1983–84, 1985–86, 1998–99, 2003–04, 2023–24
- Record attendance: 1,525 vs Coventry City, friendly match, July 2000
- Most goals: Pat Toomey

== See also ==
- Fairford Town F.C. players
- Fairford Town F.C. managers
