= Rayners Lane F.C. =

Association football club in England

Coordinates: 51°34′11″N 0°21′55″W

Rayners Lane
- Full name: Rayners Lane Football Club
- Nickname: The Lane
- Founded: 1933
- Ground: The Tithe Farm Social Club, Rayners Lane
- Capacity: 1900
- Chairman: Pete Singh
- Manager: Gary Pitt
- League: Combined Counties League Premier Division North
- 2025–26: Southern League Division One Central, 21st of 22 (relegated)
- Website: www.raynerslanefc.co.uk
Home colours	Away colours

Rayners Lane F.C. are a football club based in Rayners Lane in the London Borough of Harrow, England. They are members of the Combined Counties League Premier Division North.

== History ==
Rayners Lane Football Club was established in 1933. By the 1960s, the club had joined the Spartan League. The club left the league in 1970, but returned for two seasons between 1973 and 1975, during which time they reached the Second Round of the FA Vase. They joined the Hellenic Football League Division One in 1978, winning the league in 1981–82 and gaining promotion to the Premier Division. During the late 1980s and early 1990s, the club entered the FA Cup, reaching the Second Qualifying Round in 1992–93. The club remained in the Premier Division until being relegated in 1994 due to not having floodlights. After two seasons in Division One, Rayners Lane left the Hellenic League and joined the Middlesex League. In 1998, the club joined the Chiltonian League Premier Division, which after two seasons merged with the Hellenic League. Rayners Lane were placed in Division One East.

In the 2012-13 season, manager Dene Gardner guided Rayners Lane to the Hellenic Football League Division One East title, which would've seen the club promoted to the Hellenic Premier Division, however they were denied promotion due to ground grading issues. Gardner departed the club and was replaced by Mick Bradshaw. Rayners Lane remained in Division One East until the end of 2016-17, when they were transferred to the Spartan South Midlands Football League.

In June 2017, David Fox was appointed as the club's new manager. He guided the Lane to 13th and 12th-place finishes respectively in his first two seasons. The 2019-20 season saw Rayners Lane challenge for promotion, with the club sat in 4th place before the season was ended due to the COVID-19 pandemic.

The club transferred to the Combined Counties Football League for 2021–22. In October 2021, David Fox left his position as manager and was replaced by a management team of Ben Hanley and Warren Gaddy. Rayners Lane qualified for the playoffs, finishing the season in 4th place before losing to eventual winners Wallingford Town in the semi-final. Hanley and Gaddy subsequently departed the club and were replaced by Scott Patmore.

The 2022-23 season saw success for Rayners Lane in both the cup and the league. The club won their first ever Middlesex Premier Cup in April 2023, with Jake Tabor scoring both goals in a 2–0 final win against British Airways. The club would go on to finish in the playoffs, ending the season with another 4th-placed finish. A 3–2 win in the semi-final against London Samurai Rovers saw the Lane progress to the playoff final. On 8 May 2023, Rayners Lane beat Langley 2–0 in the final to secure promotion to Step 5 for the first time since 1994, with both goals again coming from Jake Tabor.

The following season 2023–24, saw further success for Rayners Lane in the league. The club was promoted from the Combined Counties League Premier Division North beating Bedfont Sports on penalties to secure promotion to Step 4 for the first time in the club's history

== Ground ==
Rayners Lane play their home games at Tithe Farm Sports and Social Club, 151 Rayners Lane, Harrow, Middlesex.

In April 2018, construction work began to install a new state of the art 3G pitch at the ground for the 2018/2019 season.

The New Tithe Farm Sports & Social Club House and Function Suite was operational from 3 June 2019 and was officially opened on the 5th Oct 2019 by Daniel P Gallagher at the Opening Gala Dinner

== Current squad ==
As of 01 August 2025

Note: Flags indicate national team as defined under FIFA eligibility rules; some limited exceptions apply. Players may hold more than one non-FIFA nationality.

No. / Pos. / Nation / Player	No. / Pos. / Nation / Player

== Current coaching staff ==
As of 29 April 2026

Position	Staff
Manager	Gary Pitt
Assistant Manager	Dave Roberts
Coach	Louis Blincko
Coach	Haitham Gabril

Source: https://www.pitchero.com/clubs/raynerslanefc/news/gary-pitt-appointed-as-rayners-lane-fc-first-team-manager-2976890.html

== Managerial history ==
- Don Durkin 1980-95
- Fergus Meaney- 1995-98
- Dennis Bainborough 1998-99
- Richard Hedge 1999-2003
- Danny Mills 2003-06
- Mick Turtle 2006-07
- Marvin Hall 2007-09
- Paul Leslie 2009-2010
- Dene Gardner 2010-13
- Mick Bradshaw 2013-2017
- Dave Fox-2017-Oct 2021
- Ben Hanley-Oct 2021-May 2022
- Scott Patmore May 2022-June 2023
- Gary Meakin June 2023-September 2024
- Justin Gardner Sept 2024-Dec 2024
- Mark Dacey Jan 2025-May 2025
- Scott Patmore May 2025-Dec 2025
- Omarr Lawson Dec 2025-April 2026
- Gary Pitt April 2026-

== Honours ==
- Hellenic Football League Division One East
  - Champions 2012–13
- Hellenic Football League Division One
  - Champions 1982–83
- Combined Counties Football League Premier Division One
  - Play-off winners 2022–23
- Combined Counties Football League Premier Division North
  - Play-off winners 2023–24
- Middlesex FA Premier Cup
  - Champions 2022–23
- Middlesex Senior Cup (2)
  - Champions 2023–24, 2024–25

== Records ==
- FA Cup
  - Second Qualifying Round 1992–93
- FA Trophy
  - First Qualifying Round 2025–26
- FA Vase
  - Second Round 1974–75
