= Flackwell Heath F.C. =

English football club

Coordinates: 51°36′15″N 0°42′44″W

Flackwell Heath
- Full name: Flackwell Heath Football Club
- Nickname: Heathens
- Founded: 1907
- Ground: Wilks Park, Flackwell Heath
- Capacity: 2,000 (150 seated)
- Chairman: Terry Glynn
- Manager: Mark Nisbet
- League: Southern League Division One Central
- 2025–26: Southern League Division One Central, 15th of 22
Home colours	Away colours

Flackwell Heath Football Club is a football club based in Flackwell Heath, near High Wycombe in Buckinghamshire, England. Affiliated to the Berks & Bucks Football Association, they are currently members of the Southern League Division One Central and play at Wilks Park.

== History ==
The club was established in 1907 and joined the High Wycombe and District League. They went on to win the league twelve times, as well as winning the High Wycombe Senior Challenge Cup twelve times. In 1950 the club moved up to Division Two of the Great Western Combination, which they won at the first attempt to earn promotion to Division One. This was renamed the Premier Division in 1954, and the club were runners-up in 1956–57 before winning the league in 1957–58. They were champions again in 1962–63. However, the league folded at the end of the 1963–64 season, resulting in the club returning to the High Wycombe and District League.

In 1974–75 Flackwell Heath won both the Reading Senior Cup and the Berks & Bucks Intermediate Cup. In 1976 they moved up to Division One of the Hellenic League and were runners-up in their first season in the division, earning promotion to the Premier Division. In 1982 they switched to the Athenian League, but it folded at the end of the 1983–84 season, with the club joining Division Two North of the Isthmian League instead. At the end of the 1984–85 season they were transferred to Division Two South, where they remained until league restructuring saw them placed in Division Three in 1991. The division was renamed Division Two in 2002, and when it was abolished in 2006, the club were initially due to be transferred to the Spartan South Midlands League, but East Ham United folding led to the club being restored to the Isthmian League and placed in Division One North.

The 2006–07 season saw Flackwell Heath finish bottom of Division One North, resulting in relegation to the Premier Division of the Hellenic League. They won the league in 2014–15 and were set to be promoted to Division One Central of the Southern League. However, after Clevedon Town were demoted, they were provisionally placed in Division One South & West and subsequently declined promotion due to increased travelling costs. In 2015–16 the club won the Berks & Bucks Senior Trophy, beating Newport Pagnell Town 2–0 in the final. At the end of the 2020–21 season they were transferred to the Premier Division of the Spartan South Midlands League. After a single season in the Spartan South Midlands League, they were transferred to the Premier Division North of the Combined Counties League. In 2023–24 the club were Premier Division North champions, earning promotion to Division One Central of the Southern League.

== Ground ==
Prior to World War II the club played at the Recreation Ground, but moved to Wilks Park after the war. A seated brick stand was built on one side of the pitch in 1984 when the club joined the Isthmian League. The extended roof changing rooms provides cover on the other side of the pitch, with covered standing areas behind both goals. Floodlights were installed during the club's first spell in the Hellenic League Premier Division in the late 1970s and early 1980s. It currently has a capacity of 2,000, of which 150 is seated.

== Honours ==
- Isthmian League
  - Associate Members' Cup winners 2004–05
- Hellenic League
  - Premier Division champions 2014–15
- Combined Counties Football League
- Premier Division North champions 2023–24
- Great Western Combination
  - Premier Division champions 1957–58, 1962–63
  - Division Two champions 1950–51
- Berks & Bucks Senior Trophy
  - Winners 2015–16
- Berks & Bucks intermediate Cup
  - Winners 1974–75
- Reading Senior Cup
  - Winners 1974–75
- High Wycombe Senior Challenge Cup
  - Winners 2003–04

== Records ==
- Best FA Cup performance: Fourth qualifying round, 2002–03, 2004–05, 2025–26
- Best FA Trophy performance: Third qualifying round, 2024–25
- Best FA Vase performance: Quarter–finals, 2020–21
- Record attendance: 1,500 vs Oxford United, charity match, 1965
- Most appearances: Lee Elliot
- Most goals: Tony Wood

== See also ==
- Flackwell Heath F.C. players
- Flackwell Heath F.C. managers
