= Reading City F.C. =

Association football club in England

Coordinates: 51.4657°N 1.0119°W

Reading City
- Full name: Reading City Football Club
- Nickname: The Citizens
- Founded: 2001 (as Highmoor Ibis)
- Ground: Rivermoor Stadium, Reading
- Chairman: Martin Law
- Manager: Simon Johnson
- League: Combined Counties League Premier Division North
- 2025–26: Combined Counties League Premier Division North, 6th of 20
Home colours

Reading City Football Club is a football club based in Reading, Berkshire, England. They are currently members of the Combined Counties League Premier Division North and play at the Rivermoor Stadium in the Tilehurst area of Reading.

== History ==
The club was established in 2001 as Highmoor Ibis by a merger of Highmoor and Ibis, both of which were playing in the Reading Senior League, Highmoor in the Senior Division and Ibis in the Premier Division. Ibis had also previously played in the Chiltonian League. The new club took Highmoor's place in the Senior Division and were league champions in 2003–04 without losing a match. They won the Reading Senior Cup in 2005–06, beating Woodley Town 4–1 in the final at the Madjeski Stadium.

After finishing as runners-up in 2006–07 and 2008–09, Highmoor were champions again in 2010–11, earning promotion to Division One East of the Hellenic League. In their first season in Division One East they finished as runners-up and were promoted to the Premier Division. They were Premier Division runners-up in 2014–15. In June 2018 the club were renamed Reading City. At the end of the 2020–21 season the club were transferred to the Premier Division North of the Combined Counties League. In 2023–24 they finished fourth in the Premier Division North, qualifying for the promotion play-offs. They subsequently lost 5–2 to Bedfont Sports in the semi-finals.

== Ground ==
The club played at the Ibis Club on Scours Lane until 2011 when they were forced to leave to take promotion to the Hellenic League as the ground did not have a stand or floodlights. Instead, the club moved to the Palmer Park Stadium, a general use stadium including a 780-seat stand and an athletics track around the pitch. However, in 2016 the club returned to Scours Lane, moving to the ground previously used by Reading Town. The ground was also renamed the Rivermoor Stadium.

== Honours ==
- Reading League
  - Senior Division champions 2003–04, 2010–11
- Reading Senior Cup
  - Winners 2006–07

== Records ==
- Best FA Cup performance: Second qualifying round, 2023–24
- Best FA Vase performance: Fourth round, 2025–26

== See also ==
- Reading City F.C. players
- Reading City F.C. managers
