= New College Swindon F.C. =

Association football club in England

Coordinates: 51.606°N 1.733°W

New College Swindon
- Full name: New College Swindon Football Club
- Nickname(s): The College
- Founded: 2002
- Dissolved: 2020
- Ground: Supermarine RFC, South Marston
- Chairman: Paul Bodin
- Manager: Mark Teasdale
- 2019–20: Hellenic League Division One West (season abandoned)
Home colours

New College Swindon Football Club was a football club based in Swindon, Wiltshire, England. Part of New College, Swindon, they played until the summer of 2020 in the Hellenic League at the Supermarine RFC ground in South Marston.

== History ==
The club was established in 2002 as New College Academy and joined Division One West of the Hellenic League. Although they finished in mid-table, the club left the league at the end of the season. Changing their name to Swindon New College, they dropped into Junior Division Two of the Wiltshire League. Despite only finishing fourth in 2003–04, the club moved up to the Premier Division for the 2004–05 season, becoming New College Swindon. They were champions in 2008–09, and retained the title the following season.

After finishing third in the Premier Division of the Wiltshire League in 2010–11 the club were promoted to Division One West of the Hellenic League.

== Present status ==
On 28 June 2020, it was confirmed that New College Swindon had resigned from the Hellenic Football League.

New College continue to run their football academy for students aged 16–18 of both sexes, usually alongside an academic course. They play in under-18 leagues including the Wiltshire Floodlit U18 league and the South West Counties Youth League.

== Honours ==
- Wiltshire League
  - Premier Division champions 2008–09, 2009–10

== Records ==
- Best FA Vase performance: Second qualifying round, 2013–14, 2014–15, 2016–17, 2018–19
