= Chalfont Wasps F.C. =

Association football club in England

Coordinates: 51.627285°N 0.57334095°W

Chalfont Wasps
- Full name: Chalfont Wasps Football Club
- Nickname: The Stingers
- Founded: 1922
- Ground: The Nest, Chalfont St Giles
- Chairman: Steve Waddington
- Manager: Ryan Swales
- League: Thames Valley Premier League
- 2025/2026: Thames Valley Premier League (Division One)
| Home colours | Away colours |

Chalfont Wasps Football Club is a football club based in Chalfont St Giles, near Amersham, England. They are currently members of the Thames Valley Premier League Division One and play at the Nest on Crossleys Road.

== History ==
The club was established in 1922, and joined the Wycombe Combination. They were Division One champions in 1930–31 and again in 1939–40. After World War II the club won the Chalfont & District Minor League in 1946–47 and Division Two of the Wycombe Combination in 1948–49. At this time the club president was A.E. Kirby, the first female president of a football club. They won Division One again in 1960–61 and were Premier Division champions in 1963–64.

In 1984 Chalfont were founder members of the Chiltonian League. When it gained a second division the following season, the club were placed in Division One, but were relegated to Division Two at the end of the season, having finished second-from-bottom. The division was renamed Division One in 1987, and Chalfont were promoted to the Premier Division after finishing third in 1988–89. The club were relegated to Division One at the end of the 1991–92 season, but returned to the Premier Division after finishing as Division One runners-up in 1993–94. However, after finishing bottom of the Premier Division in 1995–96, the club were relegated back to Division One.

Despite finishing fifth in 1998–99, Chalfont were promoted to the Premier Division again. At the end of the following season the Chiltonian League merged into the Hellenic League, with the club becoming members of Division One East. They were runners-up in 2006–07, and were promoted to the Premier Division after winning Division One East in 2007–08. Despite finishing seventh in their first season in the Premier Division, they were demoted back to Division One East as their ground failed to meet the ground grading criteria. At the end of the 2017–18 season the club were demoted to Division Two East due to the ground not meeting the requirements for their level.

== Ground ==
The club play at the Nest, located on council playing fields on Crossleys Road. The ground is unenclosed due to objections from the parish council.

== Honours ==
- Hellenic League
  - Division One East champions 2007–08
- Wycombe Combination
  - Premier Division champions 1963–64
  - Division One champions 1930–31, 1939–40, 1960–61
  - Division Two champions 1948–49
- Chalfont & District Minor League
  - Champions 1946–47
- Berks & Bucks Intermediate Cup
  - Winners 2005–06, 2006–07, 2007–08, 2010–11
- Wycombe Senior Cup
  - Winners 2007–08, 2009–10
- Wycombe Junior Cup
  - Winners 2002–03, 2007–08, 2008–09, 2010–11, 2011–12, 2013–14
- Chesham Challenge Cup
  - Winners 1930–31, 1939–40
- Chalfont & Gerrards Cross Cup
  - Winners 1939–40, 1959–60, 1963–64, 1971–72
- Chesham Charity Cup
  - Winners 1984–85, 1984–85, 1988–89, 1993–94
- Chesham Subsidiary Cup
  - Winners 1971–72

== Records ==
- Highest league position: 7th in the Hellenic League Premier Division, 2007–08
- Best FA Vase performance: Second qualifying round, 2008–09
