= Oxford City Nomads F.C. =

Coordinates: 51°46′26.09″N 1°13′39.91″W

Quarry Rovers Nomads (formerly Oxford City Nomads)
- Full name: Quarry Rovers Nomads FC
- Nickname: The Nomads
- Founded: 2025; 1 year ago
- Ground: Margaret Road Recreation Ground, Quarry, Oxford
Home colours	Away colours

Oxford City Nomads Football Club was a football club based in Oxford, England, but dissolved in 2018. It was refounded as the Quarry Rovers Nomads ahead of the 2025/26 season.

== History ==
The club was established in 1936 as Quarry Nomads, a youth team with pupils from the local Quarry School. The team became a men's team after the Second World War when they became part of the Oxford City Football Association. The club played in the Oxford leagues until the 1984–85 season, where having struggled for almost a decade the club stopped playing football for two years. They reformed in the 1987–88 season under the guidance of Keith Dolton, a former player who had been a member of the 1966 Oxfordshire Senior Cup winning side; that season the club entered the Oxford City F.A. Junior League. After winning the Oxfordshire Senior League Premier Division Championship in the 1993–94 season, the club was promoted to the Chiltonian League. After the 2000–01 season the club joined the Hellenic league. The club in 2005 changed its name to the Oxford Quarry Nomads, but one year later they changed their name again for the 2006–07 season to the Oxford City Nomads.

== Ground ==
After being renamed Oxford City Nomads, the club played at Oxford City's Court Place Farm ground. Previously the club played at Margaret Road, which is where the new club now plays. The 1990–91 season was an exception, when they moved to Risinghurst Cricket Club for the season.

== Honours ==
- Hellenic League
- Premier Division champions 2011–12
  - Division One East champions 2002–03
  - Challenge Cup winners 2012–13
- Oxfordshire Senior League
  - Premier Division champions 1962–63, 1993–94
- Oxfordshire Senior Cup
  - Winners 1965–66

== Records ==
- Best FA Vase performance: Second qualifying round 2017–18

== See also ==
- Oxford City Nomads F.C. players
