= Shrivenham F.C. =

Association football club in England

Coordinates: 51°36′00.27″N 1°39′28.53″W

Shrivenham
- Full name: Shrivenham Football Club
- Nickname: Shrivy
- Founded: 1900
- Ground: Barrington Park, Shrivenham
- Chairman: Matt Hirst
- Manager: Glenn Horsell
- League: Wiltshire League Premier Division
- 2024–25: Wiltshire League Premier Division, 6th of 18
Home colours

Shrivenham F.C. is a football club based in Shrivenham, an Oxfordshire village, near Swindon, England. They play in the Wiltshire League Premier Division.

The club also run a development side, Shrivenham Development, who compete in the Wiltshire League Division 1.

== History ==
They were established in 1900 and joined the Hellenic League Division One West in 2001 from the North Berks League, having won it for a second time in the 2000–01 season. They were Division One West Champions in 2004–05 and were promoted to the Hellenic League Premier Division. In the 2017-18 Hellenic League season they were promoted to the Hellenic Premier Division finishing 2nd after Easington Sports failed to beat Letcombe, losing 5–3. Despite a poor start in their return season, the club went on to record a 17-game unbeaten run post Christmas and eventually finished the campaign in a club record 5th place.

== Ground ==
Shrivenham play their home games at Barrington Park, Highworth Road, Shrivenham, Oxfordshire, SN6 8BJ.

== Club honours ==
- Hellenic League Division One West:
  - Winners: 2004–05
  - Runners Up 2017-18 (Promoted)
- North Berks League:
  - Winners: 1997–98 & 2000–01
- North Berks League Division Two:
  - Winners: 1994–95

== Club records ==
- Highest league position: 5th in Hellenic League Premier Division 2018–19
- FA Cup best performance: First qualifying round 2009–10
- FA Vase best performance: Fourth round 2007–08

== Former players ==
1. Players that have played/managed in the football league or any foreign equivalent to this level (i.e. fully professional league).
2. Players with full international caps.
3. Players that hold a club record.

- (England) Tom Jones (2003–2004)
