= Brimscombe & Thrupp F.C. =

Association football club in England

Coordinates: 51°43′18.898″N 2°11′45.233″W

Brimscombe & Thrupp
- Full name: Brimscombe & Thrupp Football Club
- Nickname: The Lilywhites
- Founded: 1886
- Ground: The Meadow, Brimscombe and Thrupp
- Chairman: Neil Long
- Manager: Tim Bond
- League: Hellenic League Division One
- 2024–25: Hellenic League Premier Division, 20th of 20 (relegated)
Home colours	Away colours

Brimscombe and Thrupp Football Club is a football club based in Brimscombe, Gloucestershire, England. Affiliated to the Gloucestershire County FA, they are currently members of the Hellenic League Division One and play at the Meadow.

== History ==
=== Brimscombe ===
Brimscombe Football Club was established in 1886. In 1894 they were founder members of the Mid-Gloucestershire League, and played the first match in the league's history on 29 September against Stroud. In 1902 they switched to the new Stroud & District League and were its inaugural champions. They finished as runners-up in 1903–04, 1904–05 and 1905–06 before winning it again in 1906–07 and 1907–08. After twice finishing third, Brimscombe were runners-up again in 1910–11 and 1911–12. They won a fourth league title in 1912–13.

After World War I Brimscombe competed in the North Gloucestershire League, finishing as runners-up in 1919–20. They were founder members of the Gloucestershire Northern Senior League in 1922, and its first champions. They won the league again in 1930–31, having finished second-bottom of the table the previous season. In 1946–47 they finished as runners-up, and were champions the following season. In 1968 the club switched to the Gloucestershire County League, finishing bottom of the table in their first season. After finishing bottom again in 1972–73, the club left the league.

=== Brimscombe & Thrupp ===
In the 1970s the club merged with Thrupp to form Brimscombe & Thrupp. They rejoined the Gloucestershire County League in 1985, but left after finishing bottom in 1988–89. The club returned to the Gloucestershire Northern Senior League, and after finishing as Division One runners-up in 2008–09, they moved up to the Gloucestershire County League for a third time. After winning the County League in 2010–11, the club were promoted to Division One West of the Hellenic League. They won the division in 2012–13, earning promotion to the Premier Division. The following season saw them win both the Supplementary and Floodlit Cups. In 2017–18 the club won the Gloucestershire Challenge Trophy, beating Bitton 3–1 in the final.

== Honours ==
- Hellenic League
  - Division One West champions 2012–13
  - Floodlit Cup winners 2013–14
  - Supplementary Cup winners 2013–14
- Gloucestershire County League
  - Champions 2010–11
- Gloucestershire Northern Senior League
  - Champions 1922–23, 1930–31, 1947–48
  - Division Two champions 2004–05
- Stroud & District League
  - Champions 1902–03, 1906–07, 1907–08, 1912–13
- Stroud Charity Cup
  - Winners 2013–14
- Gloucestershire Challenge Trophy
  - Winners 2017–18

== Records ==
- Best FA Cup performance: Third qualifying round, 2016–17
- Best FA Vase performance: Third round, 2015–16
