= 2012–13 Northern Premier League =

The 2012–13 season is the 45th season of the Northern Premier League Premier Division, and the sixth season of the Northern Premier League Division One North and South. The League sponsors for 2012–13 are Evo-Stik.

Due to Step Three leagues increasing their number of teams from 22 to 24 from the 2013–14 season onwards, only two teams will be relegated from the Premier Division, and only one team will be relegated from each of Division One North and South this season.

== Premier Division ==
Northern Premier League Premier Division
- Season: 2012–13
- Champions: North Ferriby United
- Promoted: North Ferriby United; Hednesford Town
- Relegated: Kendal Town; Eastwood Town
- Matches: 462
- Goals: 1,536 (3.32 per match)
- Top goalscorer: Ryan Kendall (36 goals)
- Biggest home win: Worksop Town 8–1 Stocksbridge Park Steels (31 October 2012); Buxton 7–0 Stocksbridge Park Steels (26 December 2012)
- Biggest away win: 5 goals: Matlock Town 0–5 Nantwich Town (18 August 2012); Eastwood Town 0–5 Ashton United (25 August 2012); Nantwich Town 0–5 Worksop Town (6 October 2012); Kendal Town 0–5 Stocksbridge Park Steels (10 November 2012); Eastwood Town 0–5 North Ferriby United (29 December 2012); Chorley 1–6 Rushall Olympic (9 February 2013); Blyth Spartans 0–5 AFC Fylde (2 March 2013)
- Highest scoring: Stocksbridge Park Steels 4–5 Chorley (17 August 2012); Worksop Town 8–1 Stocksbridge Park Steels (31 October 2012)
- Highest attendance: 2,761; F.C. United of Manchester 1–0 Worksop Town (20 April 2013)
- Lowest attendance: 79; Ashton United 2–0 Blyth Spartans (27 March 2013)

The Premier Division features six new teams:

- AFC Fylde, promoted as champions of NPL Division One North
- Blyth Spartans, relegated from Conference North
- Eastwood Town, relegated from Conference North
- Grantham Town, promoted as champions of NPL Division One South
- Ilkeston, promoted via play-offs of NPL Division One South
- Witton Albion, promoted via play-offs of NPL Division One North

=== League table ===
Pos	Team	Pld	W	D	L	GF	GA	GD	Pts	Promotion or relegation
1	North Ferriby United (C, P)	42	28	9	5	96	43	+53	93	Promotion to Conference North
2	Hednesford Town (P)	42	28	9	5	91	47	+44	93	Qualification for Playoffs
3	F.C. United of Manchester	42	25	8	9	86	48	+38	83	Qualification for Playoffs
4	Witton Albion	42	24	8	10	85	57	+28	80	Qualification for Playoffs
5	AFC Fylde	42	23	6	13	93	51	+42	75	Qualification for Playoffs
6	Rushall Olympic	42	20	10	12	69	55	+14	70	
7	Buxton	42	18	13	11	72	56	+16	67	
8	Chorley	42	20	7	15	63	52	+11	67	
9	Worksop Town	42	20	6	16	91	68	+23	66	
10	Ashton United	42	15	14	13	71	66	+5	59	
11	Ilkeston	42	15	13	14	67	55	+12	58	
12	Whitby Town	42	16	9	17	68	72	−4	57	
13	Marine	42	16	11	15	61	61	0	56 (Note: Marine were deducted 3 points for fielding an ineligible player)	
14	Nantwich Town	42	15	8	19	63	76	−13	53	
15	Stafford Rangers	42	12	15	15	54	60	−6	51	
16	Blyth Spartans	42	15	6	21	70	87	−17	51	
17	Matlock Town	42	12	9	21	54	80	−26	45	
18	Frickley Athletic	42	10	9	23	58	88	−30	39	
19	Grantham Town	42	9	9	24	56	75	−19	36	
20	Stocksbridge Park Steels	42	9	9	24	67	106	−39	36	
21	Kendal Town (R)	42	9	6	27	65	112	−47	33	Relegation to NPL Division One North
22	Eastwood Town (R)	42	3	6	33	36	121	−85	15	Relegation to NPL Division One South

Updated to match(es) played on 4 May 2013. Source:
Rules for classification: 1) points; 2) goal difference; 3) number of goals scored.
(C) Champions; (P) Promoted; (R) Relegated

=== Play-offs ===
Semifinals
2	Hednesford Town	3(3)
5	AFC Fylde	3(1)
3	F.C. United of Manchester	3
4	Witton Albion	1

Final
2	Hednesford Town	2
3	F.C. United of Manchester	1

==== Semi-finals ====
7 May 2013
19:45

Hednesford Town	3–3 (a.e.t.)	AFC Fylde
Durrell 56', 97' (pen.); MacPherson 71'	Hednesford Town Report; AFC Fylde Report; NPL Report	Blinkhorn 24'; Hinchliffe 90+'; Farrell 105'
Penalties
Durrell (penalty scored); Woolfe (penalty missed); Disney (penalty scored); Taylor (penalty scored)	3–1	(penalty missed) Farrell; (penalty scored) Denson; (penalty missed) Booth; (penalty missed) Sumner

Keys Park, Hednesford
Attendance: 1,360
7 May 2013
19:45

F.C. United of Manchester	3–1	Witton Albion
Wolfenden 9'; Mulholland 35'; Stott 74' (pen.)	Report	Hancock 53'

Gigg Lane, Bury
Attendance: 2,492

==== Finals ====
11 May 2013
15:00

Hednesford Town	2–1	F.C. United of Manchester
Harvey 2'; Osborne 32'	Report	Norton 56'

Keys Park, Hednesford
Attendance: 4,412

=== Results grid ===
Home \ Away	FYL	ASH	BLY	BUX	CHO	EAS	FCU	FRK	GRN	HED	ILK	KEN	MAR	MAT	NAN	NFU	RSO	STA	STO	WTB	WTN	WKS
AFC Fylde		1–2	1–0	5–0	0–1	5–1	4–2	3–2	5–3	1–2	2–3	4–0	2–0	3–0	3–2	1–0	1–3	0–1	4–0	4–3	1–2	2–2
Ashton United	2–2		2–0	0–1	3–2	6–0	1–2	0–0	1–1	2–2	0–3	4–1	2–4	2–0	2–1	0–2	2–3	0–0	2–3	2–2	1–3	5–3
Blyth Spartans	0–5	4–1		2–2	1–3	1–0	1–2	4–2	1–0	1–2	3–2	1–3	3–3	2–1	1–1	0–1	1–1	1–0	5–0	2–2	0–3	3–2
Buxton	1–0	6–1	2–0		1–1	6–2	0–3	1–0	1–1	0–2	0–0	1–2	1–4	1–0	3–1	2–0	2–0	2–1	7–0	2–1	2–2	0–3
Chorley	1–4	1–1	1–0	2–1		1–1	1–2	5–1	2–0	1–2	1–0	5–0	1–0	1–0	3–3	0–1	1–6	2–0	1–1	2–3	1–2	1–1
Eastwood Town	1–4	0–5	1–4	1–5	0–1		2–2	0–1	2–2	0–2	1–4	2–5	1–2	3–3	1–5	0–5	2–1	2–2	1–2	0–2	3–4	0–1
F.C. United of Manchester	2–1	3–0	2–1	1–2	1–3	4–1		3–0	1–0	1–1	1–0	6–0	0–1	4–0	1–2	1–1	0–4	3–0	4–0	3–2	0–1	1–0
Frickley Athletic	1–1	1–1	2–1	3–3	0–1	1–0	2–4		0–0	2–1	2–1	2–1	0–2	1–2	3–0	2–3	3–3	2–1	4–2	0–2	0–2	0–0
Grantham Town	1–2	0–2	2–2	0–0	0–1	4–0	2–4	2–1		2–3	1–1	3–4	1–0	3–3	1–4	2–3	2–1	2–2	1–2	2–3	1–3	3–0
Hednesford Town	2–0	1–2	3–0	3–2	3–1	2–0	1–0	3–2	3–0		2–0	2–1	2–0	2–2	3–0	2–3	3–4	2–2	4–1	4–0	2–1	0–4
Ilkeston	1–1	2–2	3–1	1–1	1–0	2–1	1–1	4–2	2–0	0–2		4–4	1–0	0–2	3–0	2–2	0–1	0–2	1–0	3–1	2–3	2–1
Kendal Town	2–2	2–2	1–3	1–0	1–4	6–0	1–5	0–2	1–0	1–3	3–2		2–3	4–1	0–1	2–4	0–2	2–2	0–5	2–4	1–2	3–4
Marine	0–4	0–0	5–1	2–0	2–0	2–0	0–3	2–2	1–0	0–0	1–1	2–2		1–3	2–1	1–3	1–1	3–1	2–1	2–5	3–0	2–3
Matlock Town	2–1	2–2	1–3	1–1	1–0	0–1	2–2	3–1	3–2	2–3	1–1	3–0	1–0		0–5	0–2	0–3	2–3	1–1	0–0	1–2	1–5
Nantwich Town	0–3	0–2	2–1	2–2	0–1	1–0	2–3	3–2	0–2	1–1	1–0	1–1	2–3	0–1		2–3	0–2	1–1	4–3	2–1	2–1	0–5
North Ferriby United	0–1	2–0	3–2	1–1	1–0	6–1	1–1	4–0	3–1	2–3	1–1	3–2	3–1	2–1	0–0		2–2	1–1	5–1	1–1	2–0	2–0
Rushall Olympic	2–0	0–0	5–2	0–1	0–0	2–0	0–1	1–0	3–1	2–2	2–1	1–0	2–0	0–4	2–3	0–3		1–1	1–1	1–1	0–4	0–1
Stafford Rangers	4–2	0–0	2–4	2–2	1–0	2–0	1–1	3–3	0–1	0–1	2–1	5–1	0–0	1–0	2–0	0–2	1–2		1–1	0–1	0–0	3–1
Stocksbridge Park Steels	0–2	0–3	2–3	0–2	4–5	1–1	1–3	4–3	0–3	3–3	1–1	5–3	2–2	2–3	5–2	0–4	3–0	2–0		1–4	3–3	1–2
Whitby Town	0–4	1–3	1–3	1–1	1–1	1–1	0–1	4–1	2–0	0–2	0–4	1–0	1–1	1–0	1–2	2–4	0–1	4–0	3–2		1–3	2–2
Witton Albion	0–2	0–2	2–1	2–4	1–3	3–0	1–1	5–0	0–2	1–1	2–2	3–0	2–0	3–0	2–2	2–4	2–0	3–1	1–0	4–2		4–3
Worksop Town	0–0	5–1	8–1	2–0	1–0	2–3	4–1	3–2	3–2	0–4	1–4	3–0	1–1	6–1	0–2	2–1	2–3	2–3	2–1	0–1	1–1	

Updated to match(es) played on 4 May 2013. Source: NPL Premier Division results grid
Legend: Blue = home team win; Yellow = draw; Red = away team win.

=== Stadia and locations ===
Locations of the 2012–13 Northern Premier League Premier Division teams

Team	Stadium	Capacity
F.C. United of Manchester	Gigg Lane (Bury ground share)	11,840
Grantham Town	South Kesteven Sports Stadium	7,500
Hednesford Town	Keys Park	6,500
Buxton	The Silverlands	5,200
Eastwood Town	Coronation Park	5,000
Witton Albion	Wincham Park	4,813
Ashton United	Hurst Cross	4,500
Blyth Spartans	Croft Park	4,435
Chorley	The Chorley Group Victory Park Stadium	4,100
Ilkeston	New Manor Ground	3,500
Nantwich Town	The Weaver Stadium	3,500
Stocksbridge Park Steels	Look Local Stadium	3,500
Whitby Town	Turnbull Ground	3,500
Worksop Town	Sandy Lane	3,200
Stafford Rangers	Marston Road	3,000
Marine	The Arriva Stadium	2,800
North Ferriby United	Grange Lane	2,700
Kendal Town	Lakeland Radio Stadium	2,400
Matlock Town	Causeway Lane	2,214
Frickley Athletic	Westfield Lane	2,087
AFC Fylde	Kellamergh Park	1,500
Rushall Olympic	Dales Lane	1,400

== Division One North ==
Northern Premier League Division One North
- Season: 2012–13
- Matches: 462
- Goals: 1,598 (3.46 per match)
- Biggest home win: Curzon Ashton 10–1 Wakefield (1 April 2013)
- Biggest away win: Ossett Albion 0–8 Trafford (18 August 2012)
- Highest scoring: 11 goals: New Mills 9–2 Garforth Town (19 November 2012); Curzon Ashton 10–1 Wakefield (1 April 2013)
- Highest attendance: 615 Curzon Ashton 1–1 Cammell Laird (12 January 2013)
- Lowest attendance: 29 Cammell Laird 3–2 Radcliffe Borough (12 March 2013)

Division One North features four new teams:

- Burscough, relegated from the NPL Premier Division
- New Mills and Goole, transferred from the NPL Division One South
- Ramsbottom United, promoted as champions from the North West Counties League Premier Division

=== League table ===
Pos	Team	Pld	W	D	L	GF	GA	GD	Pts	Promotion or relegation
1	Skelmersdale United (C, P)	42	32	6	4	110	41	+69	102	Promotion to NPL Premier Division
2	Cammell Laird	42	26	8	8	86	58	+28	86	Qualification for Playoffs
3	New Mills	42	26	7	9	107	69	+38	85	Qualification for Playoffs
4	Trafford (P)	42	24	8	10	93	44	+49	80	Qualification for Playoffs
5	Mossley	42	24	8	10	83	48	+35	80	Qualification for Playoffs
6	Ramsbottom United	42	24	7	11	97	49	+48	79	
7	Curzon Ashton	42	22	7	13	98	67	+31	73	
8	Clitheroe	42	21	10	11	66	63	+3	73	
9	Bamber Bridge	42	21	7	14	86	58	+28	70	
10	Warrington Town	42	19	12	11	76	54	+22	69	
11	Burscough	42	14	17	11	81	64	+17	59	
12	Ossett Town	42	14	13	15	67	65	+2	55	
13	Lancaster City	42	15	8	19	70	73	−3	50 (Note: Lancaster City deducted 3 points for fielding an ineligible player.)	
14	Farsley	42	13	10	19	72	80	−8	49	
15	Radcliffe Borough	42	11	15	16	68	69	−1	48	
16	Salford City	42	11	13	18	65	79	−14	46	
17	Prescot Cables	42	12	10	20	51	67	−16	46	
18	Harrogate Railway Athletic	42	11	8	23	47	89	−42	41	
19	Wakefield	42	6	9	27	38	119	−81	27	
20	Ossett Albion	42	6	7	29	49	96	−47	25	
21	Goole	42	5	8	29	44	89	−45	23	Transferred to the NPL Division One South
22	Garforth Town (R)	42	4	4	34	44	157	−113	16	Relegation to NCEFL Premier Division

Updated to match(es) played on 1 May 2013. Source:
Rules for classification: 1) points; 2) goal difference; 3) number of goals scored.
(C) Champions; (P) Promoted; (R) Relegated

=== Play-offs ===
Semifinals
2	Cammell Laird	1
5	Mossley	0
3	New Mills	0
4	Trafford (a.e.t.)	2

Final
2	Cammell Laird	0(2)
4	Trafford (p)	0(4)

==== Semifinals ====
6 May 2013
15:00

Cammell Laird	1–0	Mossley
Holt 90+3'

Kirklands Stadium, Birkenhead
Attendance: 338
6 May 2013
15:00

New Mills	0–2 (a.e.t.)	Trafford
		Ahern 97'; Oates 120'

Church Lane, New Mills
Attendance: 448

==== Final ====
10 May 2013
19:45

Cammell Laird	0–0	Trafford
	Report
Penalties
	2–4

Kirklands Stadium, Birkenhead
Attendance: 622

=== Results grid ===
Home \ Away	BAM	BUR	CAM	CLT	CZA	FAR	GAR	GOO	HRA	LNC	MOS	NEM	OSA	OST	PRC	RAD	RAM	SLC	SKU	TRA	WAK	WAR
Bamber Bridge		2–1	0–0	1–3	3–0	4–0	5–0	3–0	4–1	4–3	2–2	1–4	3–2	4–0	2–1	3–1	1–1	1–2	0–2	1–0	2–0	0–0
Burscough	1–0		2–2	0–0	0–0	5–1	5–0	3–1	0–1	1–4	0–0	0–3	2–1	1–1	1–2	4–2	0–2	2–2	4–1	1–3	1–1	1–1
Cammell Laird	3–2	4–2		3–2	1–2	2–4	2–0	1–0	0–1	1–0	1–2	0–0	3–2	4–2	5–2	3–2	3–1	3–2	3–2	1–1	2–1	2–1
Clitheroe	2–1	3–2	2–1		2–1	0–0	3–1	3–1	3–3	1–0	1–0	0–0	3–2	0–2	2–0	0–3	1–3	2–2	1–7	2–0	2–2	2–0
Curzon Ashton	4–2	2–5	1–1	1–1		3–2	6–0	3–2	3–0	4–1	3–0	4–3	3–2	0–1	2–2	0–2	1–0	3–1	1–6	0–0	10–1	4–2
Farsley	1–1	1–2	1–3	3–0	1–1		5–0	1–1	2–3	2–3	0–4	1–2	2–0	4–0	1–1	2–0	1–1	5–3	1–5	3–4	3–0	0–3
Garforth Town	0–3	1–5	0–4	0–2	1–6	1–3		0–0	1–2	3–4	0–6	3–4	2–4	0–6	1–4	2–2	0–5	0–2	0–3	2–4	1–1	2–5
Goole	0–2	2–2	0–2	1–2	0–2	0–3	6–2		1–0	1–3	0–4	2–3	3–1	2–0	0–1	1–2	0–2	0–0	0–0	1–2	1–2	1–2
Harrogate Railway Athletic	1–2	1–6	1–3	4–2	0–2	2–2	2–3	3–0		0–4	0–1	1–4	1–3	1–2	1–3	2–2	0–2	2–0	3–2	1–0	1–1	1–2
Lancaster City	4–2	2–2	1–2	2–2	3–2	1–1	4–1	2–2	2–1		0–0	1–2	1–0	2–3	3–1	2–2	0–5	0–1	1–3	0–0	0–1	1–1
Mossley	1–0	3–1	1–3	2–3	1–2	3–0	7–0	2–1	3–0	2–0		0–4	2–0	2–1	4–1	2–0	0–4	2–2	0–2	3–2	2–2	1–0
New Mills	1–5	1–2	1–1	1–2	2–1	3–0	9–2	3–1	4–0	3–1	2–2		5–1	2–1	2–1	1–4	1–0	2–1	1–1	1–2	6–0	1–6
Ossett Albion	0–1	1–1	1–2	0–1	2–0	2–0	0–1	3–2	0–2	0–3	3–3	1–4		0–2	0–0	1–2	1–6	2–0	1–4	0–8	2–3	0–2
Ossett Town	2–1	2–2	3–0	1–1	1–4	3–3	5–5	0–2	0–0	1–2	0–1	3–3	1–1		1–1	0–0	0–1	3–2	0–1	0–4	6–0	2–2
Prescot Cables	2–3	0–0	0–2	0–2	1–3	0–1	1–0	2–1	2–2	3–2	1–2	1–2	2–1	1–2		1–1	2–0	0–3	0–1	1–1	4–0	1–1
Radcliffe Borough	2–2	1–1	0–3	1–3	3–1	2–2	6–2	1–1	1–2	2–0	1–2	2–3	1–1	1–2	1–0		2–2	1–1	0–2	2–0	4–0	2–2
Ramsbottom United	2–2	3–1	3–3	3–0	3–4	1–2	6–0	2–1	4–0	2–0	1–2	2–3	4–3	1–1	3–0	3–2		5–1	0–2	2–1	2–1	0–0
Salford City	2–4	2–6	2–2	1–1	1–1	2–0	3–0	3–0	1–1	1–0	0–2	1–2	2–0	0–2	1–1	1–1	2–3		0–3	3–3	5–2	1–1
Skelmersdale United	2–1	3–3	6–1	3–0	3–2	4–0	3–1	2–2	4–0	3–1	2–1	3–3	4–1	2–1	3–1	2–1	2–1	3–2		1–2	2–0	1–1
Trafford	2–0	0–0	0–1	3–0	0–3	3–2	3–0	5–1	4–0	3–0	2–0	2–0	2–2	2–1	1–2	4–1	2–1	6–0	0–2		7–0	3–2
Wakefield	0–5	1–1	2–1	0–3	2–1	0–5	0–2	3–1	0–0	1–4	1–6	3–5	1–1	0–3	1–2	2–2	1–2	0–3	0–2	0–1		1–2
Warrington Town	3–1	1–2	0–2	2–1	2–3	2–1	1–4	7–2	4–0	1–3	0–0	4–1	2–1	0–0	2–0	1–0	0–3	2–1	0–1	1–1	4–1	

Updated to match(es) played on 4 May 2013. Source: NPL Division North results grid
Legend: Blue = home team win; Yellow = draw; Red = away team win.

=== Stadia and locations ===
Locations of the 2012–13 Northern Premier League Division One North teams

Team	Stadium	Capacity
Wakefield	Belle Vue (groundshare with Wakefield Trinity Wildcats)	11,000
Curzon Ashton	Tameside Stadium	4,000
Mossley	Seel Park	4,000
Farsley	Throstle Nest	3,900
Harrogate Railway Athletic	Station View	3,500
Lancaster City	Giant Axe	3,500
Radcliffe Borough	Stainton Park	3,500
Warrington Town	Cantilever Park	3,500
Prescot Cables	Valerie Park	3,200
Burscough	Queensgate	3,054
Garforth Town	Genix Healthcare Stadium	3,000
Goole	Victoria Pleasure Grounds	3,000
Ossett Albion	WareHouse Systems Stadium	3,000
Skelmersdale United	West Lancashire College Stadium	2,500
Trafford	Shawe View	2,500
Bamber Bridge	QED Stadium	2,264
Clitheroe	Shawbridge	2,000
Ossett Town	Stade France Stadium	2,000
Ramsbottom United	The Harry Williams Riverside	2,000
Cammell Laird	Kirklands Stadium	1,500
New Mills	Church Lane	1,400
Salford City	Moor Lane	1,400

== Division One South ==
Northern Premier League Division One South
- Season: 2012–13
- Champions: King's Lynn Town
- Promoted: King's Lynn Town; Stamford
- Relegated: Hucknall Town
- Biggest home win: Loughborough Dynamo 13–0 Hucknall Town (1 January 2013)
- Biggest away win: Hucknall Town 1–9 Coalville Town (20 October 2012)
- Highest scoring: Loughborough Dynamo 13–0 Hucknall Town (1 January 2013)
- Highest attendance: 1,958 King's Lynn Town 2–1 Sheffield (30 April 2013)
- Lowest attendance: 34 Hucknall Town 2–4 Market Drayton Town (19 March 2013)

Division One South features six new teams:

- Chasetown, relegated from the NPL Premier Division
- Gresley, promoted as champions from the Midland Alliance
- Halesowen Town, transferred from the Southern League Division One South & West
- Mickleover Sports, relegated from the NPL Premier Division
- Northwich Victoria, demoted from the NPL Premier Division
- King's Lynn Town, promoted as runners-up from the United Counties League Premier Division

=== League table ===
Pos	Team	Pld	W	D	L	GF	GA	GD	Pts	Promotion or relegation
1	King's Lynn Town (C, P)	42	28	8	6	86	46	+40	92	Promotion to NPL Premier Division
2	Coalville Town	42	25	11	6	108	44	+64	86	Qualification for Playoffs
3	Belper Town	42	23	13	6	95	42	+53	82	Qualification for Playoffs
4	Stamford (P)	42	23	7	12	97	58	+39	76	Qualification for Playoffs
5	Chasetown	42	21	11	10	83	51	+32	74	Qualification for Playoffs
6	Sutton Coldfield Town	42	22	8	12	81	61	+20	74	
7	Halesowen Town	42	23	5	14	79	65	+14	74	
8	Northwich Victoria	42	19	10	13	88	58	+30	67	Transferred to the NPL Division One North
9	Sheffield	42	18	9	15	85	82	+3	63	
10	Leek Town	42	15	14	13	72	60	+12	59	
11	Gresley	42	16	10	16	75	77	−2	58	
12	Carlton Town	42	16	8	18	67	68	−1	56	
13	Brigg Town	42	14	11	17	62	76	−14	53	
14	Rainworth Miners Welfare	42	14	9	19	59	75	−16	51	
15	Market Drayton Town	42	13	11	18	68	78	−10	50	
16	Loughborough Dynamo	42	13	10	19	75	75	0	49	
17	Newcastle Town	42	11	13	18	45	58	−13	46	
18	Kidsgrove Athletic	42	12	7	23	75	89	−14	43	
19	Romulus	42	11	9	22	52	78	−26	42	
20	Lincoln United	42	9	9	24	64	102	−38	36	
21	Mickleover Sports	42	7	13	22	51	92	−41	34	
22	Hucknall Town (R)	42	4	4	34	39	171	−132	16	Relegation to CMFL South Division

Updated to match(es) played on 4 May 2013. Source:
Rules for classification: 1) points; 2) goal difference; 3) number of goals scored.
(C) Champions; (P) Promoted; (R) Relegated

=== Play-offs ===
Semifinals
2	Coalville Town	1
5	Chasetown	2
3	Belper Town	2
4	Stamford (a.e.t.)	4

Final
4	Stamford	2
5	Chasetown	1

==== Semifinals ====
6 May 2013
15:00

Coalville Town	1–2	Chasetown
Murdock 45'		Robinson 21', 54'

Owen Street Sports Ground, Coalville
Attendance: 495
6 May 2013
15:00

Belper Town	2–4 (a.e.t.)	Stamford
Cotton 6'; Froggatt 13'		Miller 16'; Brooks 66'; Hall 105' (pen.); Richards 120'

Christchurch Meadow, Belper
Attendance: 620

==== Final ====
10 May 2013
19:45

Stamford	2–1	Chasetown
Brooks 4'; Miller 83'		Hay 15'

Kettering Road, Stamford
Attendance: 864

=== Results grid ===
Home \ Away	BLP	BRG	CAR	CHA	COA	GRE	HAL	HUC	KID	KLT	LEE	LIN	LOU	MAR	MIC	NEW	NOR	RAI	ROM	SHE	STM	SUT
Belper Town		1–1	1–1	3–0	1–1	1–1	4–1	2–0	5–1	0–3	1–1	3–0	3–1	5–0	2–0	1–1	3–1	1–2	9–0	2–2	4–0	1–0
Brigg Town	2–2		3–0	0–1	0–3	3–3	2–2	1–0	3–1	1–1	3–2	2–0	1–1	2–0	2–1	1–3	0–3	3–2	0–5	0–3	2–3	2–1
Carlton Town	0–1	5–2		2–2	3–2	0–1	1–2	1–0	4–2	2–2	3–2	1–1	1–2	2–3	0–1	1–0	1–2	0–0	2–0	2–2	2–3	2–3
Chasetown	1–1	2–0	5–0		1–4	3–4	3–0	4–0	6–1	0–1	0–0	3–1	3–0	0–1	1–1	2–0	0–1	3–0	3–2	5–1	3–1	2–2
Coalville Town	1–1	2–1	5–1	1–1		1–1	0–1	5–0	4–3	0–0	6–2	2–1	0–0	2–2	6–1	4–1	1–0	3–0	3–1	3–1	1–0	2–0
Gresley	1–0	2–4	0–2	1–4	1–2		3–2	5–2	2–1	1–2	1–1	0–0	3–2	2–0	1–1	1–3	2–1	3–0	0–1	2–3	1–3	1–2
Halesowen Town	1–3	2–1	2–1	1–1	1–5	4–2		2–1	4–3	1–0	2–2	5–0	3–0	1–0	1–3	0–0	3–1	1–3	5–0	2–3	1–1	2–1
Hucknall Town	0–5	1–6	0–3	3–2	1–9	1–3	0–4		0–5	1–3	1–6	1–1	1–7	2–4	0–2	0–1	1–2	1–8	1–3	0–5	2–2	2–3
Kidsgrove Athletic	2–2	3–1	1–2	0–1	1–1	5–3	1–0	4–0		1–2	3–3	2–1	3–2	2–2	1–1	4–1	0–1	3–0	0–0	1–4	1–3	0–2
King's Lynn Town	1–2	3–2	0–0	1–0	3–1	2–2	3–2	2–4	3–1		2–0	5–2	2–0	3–0	7–0	3–2	1–0	2–0	3–0	2–1	2–1	2–0
Leek Town	1–2	1–1	2–1	1–1	0–4	1–2	0–2	5–1	2–1	1–1		3–1	0–1	3–0	3–1	0–2	1–1	2–2	5–1	0–1	3–0	2–1
Lincoln United	2–4	1–0	2–4	2–2	2–1	5–2	1–2	0–1	1–4	2–3	1–2		1–3	2–1	1–3	1–2	1–2	3–1	0–3	2–6	1–1	3–2
Loughborough Dynamo	0–0	1–1	2–4	3–0	0–2	1–1	0–2	13–0	5–1	3–5	0–3	1–2		1–5	4–2	0–3	1–3	0–0	2–0	4–1	0–2	0–2
Market Drayton Town	3–2	1–1	1–4	0–1	2–5	0–1	2–3	2–4	2–0	0–1	1–1	3–3	4–1		3–3	3–1	2–3	3–1	1–0	6–3	0–1	1–0
Mickleover Sports	0–0	0–2	2–2	0–3	0–5	0–4	3–2	4–0	0–3	1–3	0–1	0–1	1–1	2–2		0–1	0–2	1–0	0–1	3–3	1–2	2–2
Newcastle Town	1–2	1–1	1–0	4–0	2–1	3–1	2–3	1–1	0–4	0–0	1–1	2–2	0–0	0–1	1–1		1–1	0–0	0–2	0–1	0–0	0–2
Northwich Victoria	1–2	2–0	2–3	0–1	3–0	2–2	3–0	10–0	1–1	0–1	4–3	3–3	4–4	1–1	4–1	3–1		2–0	3–1	2–2	3–4	0–1
Rainworth Miners Welfare	1–3	1–2	2–0	0–2	1–1	2–1	0–2	4–1	3–1	2–2	1–0	3–4	0–0	2–2	4–2	3–2	0–0		2–1	1–2	0–4	1–0
Romulus	0–3	1–1	0–2	1–3	0–1	0–2	0–1	7–2	1–0	1–2	1–1	3–1	2–4	1–1	2–2	1–1	2–2	2–3		2–1	0–2	1–1
Sheffield	1–5	1–2	2–0	2–2	3–3	1–2	0–3	3–3	3–0	2–0	0–2	2–2	1–2	3–1	2–2	1–0	2–1	3–1	2–0		2–1	2–3
Stamford	4–1	3–0	1–2	1–2	1–1	2–2	4–1	8–0	4–1	4–1	0–1	5–1	1–2	3–2	5–2	3–0	5–3	1–2	0–2	4–1		0–0
Sutton Coldfield Town	2–1	5–0	1–0	4–4	0–4	4–2	2–0	4–0	4–3	3–1	2–2	4–3	2–1	0–0	2–1	2–0	0–5	5–1	1–1	4–0	2–4	

Updated to match(es) played on 4 May 2013. Source: NPL Division South results grid
Legend: Blue = home team win; Yellow = draw; Red = away team win.

=== Stadia and locations ===
Locations of the 2012–13 Northern Premier League Division One South teams

Team	Stadium	Capacity
King's Lynn Town	The Walks	5,733
Halesowen Town	The Grove	5,000
Hucknall Town	Watnall Road	5,000
Brigg Town	The Hawthorns	4,000
Newcastle Town	Lyme Valley Stadium	4,000
Leek Town	Harrison Park	3,600
Northwich Victoria	Marston Road (groundshare with Stafford Rangers)	3,000
Belper Town	Christchurch Meadow	2,400
Gresley	The Moat Ground	2,400
Lincoln United	Ashby Avenue	2,200
Chasetown	The Scholars Ground	2,000
Coalville Town	Owen Street Sports Ground	2,000
Kidsgrove Athletic	The Seddon Stadium	2,000
Rainworth Miners Welfare	Welfare Ground	2,000
Romulus	The Central Ground (Sutton Coldfield Town ground share)	2,000
Sheffield	Coach and Horses Ground	2,000
Stamford	Kettering Road	2,000
Sutton Coldfield Town	The Central Ground	2,000
Carlton Town	Bill Stokeld Stadium	1,500
Loughborough Dynamo	Nanpantan Sports Ground	1,500
Mickleover Sports	Raygar Stadium	1,500
Market Drayton Town	Greenfields Sports Ground	1,000

== Challenge Cup ==
2012–13 Northern Premier League Challenge Cup
Tournament details
- Country: England
- Teams: 66

Final positions
- Champions: North Ferriby United
- Runners-up: Curzon Ashton

Tournament statistics
- Matches played: 65
- Goals scored: 266 (4.09 per match)

The 2012–13 Northern Premier League Challenge Cup (billed as the 2012–13 Doodson Sports Cup for sponsorship reasons) is the 43rd season of the Northern Premier League Challenge Cup, the cup competition of the Northern Premier League.

=== Calendar ===
Round	matches played	matches	Clubs
Preliminary round	5–13 November 2012	4	66 → 62
First round	20 November – 18 December 2012	20	62 → 42
Second round	18 December – 14 January 2013	10	42 → 32
Third round	7 January – 25 February 2013	16	32 → 16
Fourth round	29 January – 12 March 2013	8	16 → 8
Quarterfinals	12–19 March 2013	4	8 → 4
Semifinals	3–4 April 2013	2	4 → 2
Final	23 April 2013	1	2 → 1

=== Preliminary round ===
In the preliminary round, eight teams from the lower regional divisions have been drawn together.

Tie no	Home team	Score	Away team	Attendance
1	New Mills	0–4	Leek Town	80
2	Romulus	2–1	Gresley	52
3	Salford City	0–1	Curzon Ashton	49
4	Sheffield	5–3	Harrogate Railway Athletic	124

=== First round ===
The four clubs which make it through the preliminary round enter into the draw with the rest of the teams from the two Division One leagues which weren't drawn into the preliminary round.

Tie no	Home team	Score	Away team	Attendance
5	Bamber Bridge	1–2; AET	Cammell Laird	80
6	Burscough	2–1	Ramsbottom United	75
7	Coalville Town	4–6; AET	Rainworth Miners Welfare	62
8	Farsley	2–1	Ossett Albion	76
9	Garforth Town	1–2	Sheffield	56
10	Halesowen Town	1–3; AET	Carlton Town	84
11	Hucknall Town	0–4	Brigg Town	36
12	King's Lynn Town	1–2	Stamford	201
13	Lancaster City	0–1	Curzon Ashton	72
14	Lincoln United	1–4	Mickleover Sports	36

Tie no	Home team	Score	Away team	Attendance
15	Mossley	1–7	Warrington Town	95
16	Newcastle Town	1–2	Market Drayton Town	62
17	Northwich Victoria	2–0	Kidsgrove Athletic	65
18	Ossett Town	3–1; AET	Belper Town	63
19	Radcliffe Borough	4–5	Clitheroe	68
20	Romulus	0–2	Chasetown	71
21	Skelmersdale United	7–1	Prescot Cables	104
22	Sutton Coldfield Town	4–2	Loughborough Dynamo	49
23	Trafford	3–1	Leek Town	47
24	Wakefield	2–3	Goole	40

=== Second round ===
The 20 clubs which make it through the first round enter into the draw.

Tie no	Home team	Score	Away team	Attendance
25	Brigg Town	3–5; AET	Sheffield	76
26	Carlton Town	2–1	Ossett Town	54
27	Chasetown	1–5	Northwich Victoria	104
28	Curzon Ashton	2–0	Burscough	64
29	Farsley	4–1	Clitheroe	61

Tie no	Home team	Score	Away team	Attendance
30	Goole	0–4	Rainworth Miners Welfare	43
31	Market Drayton Town	1–0	Sutton Coldfield Town	33
32	Mickleover Sports	4–3; AET	Stamford	58
33	Skelmersdale United	2–2; AET	Cammell Laird	101
Cammell Laird 3–0 on penalties
34	Trafford	3–2	Warrington Town	126

=== Third round ===
Teams from the Northern Premier League Premier Division entered at this stage, along with the 10 winners from the second round. The draw for the third round was made on 19 December 2012.

8 January 2013 35	Witton Albion	3–1	AFC Fylde	Wincham Park, Northwich
19:45	Shaw 29'; Gardner 52' (pen.), 82' (pen.)	Witton Albion Report; AFC Fylde Report	Horne 70' (o.g.)	Attendance: 152; Referee: Mark Astley

30 January 2013 36	Ashton United	1–2	F.C. United of Manchester	Hurst Cross, Ashton-under-Lyne
19:45	Sherriff 51'	Ashton United Report; F.C. United Report	Norton 23'; Jones 49'	Attendance: 229

19 February 2013 37	North Ferriby United	6–3	Sheffield	Grange Lane, North Ferriby
19:45	Banks 5'; Bradshaw 47', 52', 78', 89'; Bolder 60'	North Ferriby Report; Sheffield Report	Forbes-Swindells 48'; Woolley 51'; Gray 67' (o.g.)	Attendance: 65

30 January 2013 38	Northwich Victoria	1–0	Market Drayton Town	Marston Road, Stafford
19:45	Harries 58'	Northwich Victoria Report; Market Drayton Town Report		Attendance: 48

29 January 2013 39	Chorley	2–3	Cammell Laird	Victory Park, Chorley
19:45	Atherton 18' (o.g.); Roscoe 63'	Chorley Report	Grogan 2'; Holt 80'; Dysar 90+'	Attendance: 117

25 February 2013 40	Curzon Ashton	3–0	Kendal Town	Tameside Stadium, Ashton-under-Lyne
19:45	Walker 20', 29'; McDonagh 58'	Curzon Ashton Report; Kendal Town Report		Attendance: 85

8 January 2013 41	Farsley	3–1	Whitby Town	Throstle Nest, Farsley
19:45	Harrison 30'; Stead 41'; Priestley 62'	Whitby Town Report	Snaith 32'	Attendance: 102

7 January 2013 42	Ilkeston	1–2	Eastwood Town	New Manor Ground, Ilkeston
19:45	Gardner 10'	Ilkeston Report; Eastwood Town Report	Green 34'; Elliott 68'	Attendance: 230

15 January 2013 43	Marine	3–0	Trafford	Arriva Stadium, Crosby
19:45	Noon 26', 51', 82'	Marine Report		Attendance: 119; Referee: Barry Cropp

12 February 2013 44	Matlock Town	2–1	Carlton Town	Causeway Lane, Matlock
19:45	Yates 12'; McDonald 76'	Matlock Town Report	Henry 17'	Attendance: 82

8 January 2013 45	Mickleover Sports	1–4	Grantham Town	The Raygar Stadium, Mickleover
19:45	Munn 40'	Grantham Town Report	Troke 2', 56'; Lewis 33'; Demidh 62'	Attendance: 67

8 January 2013 46	Rainworth Miners Welfare	2–0 (a.e.t.)	Buxton	Kirklington Road, Rainworth
19:45	Cooksey 99'; Goward 104'	Rainworth Miners Report; Buxton Report		Attendance: 78

8 January 2013 47	Rushall Olympic	1–0	Hednesford Town	Dales Lane, Rushall
19:45	Craddock 15'	Rushall Olympic Report; Hednesford Town Report		Attendance: 112

8 January 2013 48	Stafford Rangers	1–2	Nantwich Town	Marston Road, Stafford
19:45	Ashton 90'	Stafford Rangers Report; Nantwich Town Report	Wilson 29'; Cooke 86' (pen.)	Attendance: 210; Referee: Thomas Harty

8 January 2013 49	Stocksbridge Park Steels	3–5 (a.e.t.)	Blyth Spartans	Look Local Stadium, Stocksbridge
19:45	Turner 18'; Thewlis 75'; South 80'	Stocksbridge Park Report; Blyth Spartans Report	Buchanan 28'; McGorrigan 41'; Jennings 86'; Dale 104'; Maguire 117'	Attendance: 48

9 January 2013 50	Worksop Town	4–1	Frickley Athletic	Sandy Lane, Worksop
19:45	Hawes 19'; Jackson 21', 59'; Telling 26'	Worksop Town Report; Frickley Athletic Report	Hinsley 52'	Attendance: 196

=== Fourth round ===
The draw for the fourth round took place on 10 January 2013, with the 16 clubs that made it through the third round.

19 February 2013 51	Witton Albion	4–3	F.C. United of Manchester	Wincham Park, Northwich
19:45	Tuck 30', 54'; Powell 38'; Andrews 78'	F.C. United Report; Witton Albion Report	Stott 14', 90'; Giggs 71'	Attendance: 382; Referee: Peter Gooch

26 February 2013 52	Blyth Spartans	1–2	North Ferriby United	Croft Park, Blyth
19:45	Mason 80'	Blyth Spartans Report; North Ferriby Report	Bradshaw 66'; Wilson 89'	Attendance: 208

29 January 2013 53	Eastwood Town	2–0	Rainworth Miners Welfare	Coronation Park, Eastwood
19:45	Breach 18'; White 77'	Rainworth Report		Attendance: 91; Referee: Duncan Street

29 January 2013 54	Farsley	2–1	Worksop Town	Throstle Nest, Farsley
19:45	Tiani 40'; Priestley 66'	Worksop Town Report; Farsley Report	Burbeary 70'	Attendance: 97; Referee: Gary Chapman

26 February 2013 55	Grantham Town	1–2	Matlock Town	South Kesteven Sports Stadium, Grantham
19:45	Smith 15'	Grantham Town Report; Matlock Town Report	Grayson 35' (pen.); McDonald 44'	Attendance: 81

12 February 2013 56	Marine	1–2	Cammell Laird	Arriva Stadium, Crosby
19:45	Burton 48'	Marine Report; Cammell Laird Report	Henders 25'; Foley 90+'	Attendance: 104; Referee: Ian Gittins

14 March 2013 57	Nantwich Town	1–3	Curzon Ashton	Weaver Stadium, Nantwich
19:45	Moss 32'	Nantwich Town Report; Curzon Ashton Report	Kay 17'; Henderson 24'; Dell 84'	Attendance: 105

5 February 2013 58	Rushall Olympic	1–2	Northwich Victoria	Dales Lane, Rushall
19:45	Bragioli 28'	Rushall Olympic Report; Northwich Victoria Report	Wisdom 11'; Leadbetter 82'	Attendance: 48

=== Quarter-finals ===
The eight clubs to have made it through the fourth round were entered into the quarter-finals draw, which took place on 19 February 2013. Cammell Laird, Farsley, and Curzon Ashton from the NPL Division One North and Northwich Victoria from the NPL Division One South remain as the lowest-placed teams still in the Cup.

12 March 2013 59	Eastwood Town	0–5	North Ferriby United	Coronation Park, Eastwood
19:45		report	Robson 3'; Bradshaw 45', 75', 76'; Banks 72'	Attendance: 51

19 March 2013 60	Cammell Laird	3–1 (a.e.t.)	Northwich Victoria	Kirklands Stadium, Birkenhead
19:45	Holt 15'; Cairns 103'; Henders 111'	report	Wisdom 14'	Attendance: 59

19 March 2013 61	Matlock Town	3–1	Farsley	Causeway Lane, Matlock
19:45	Ashmore 12'; McMahon 19'; McDonald 58'	report	Grant 63'	Attendance: 126

20 March 2013 62	Curzon Ashton	0–4	Witton Albion	Tameside Stadium, Ashton-under-Lyne
19:45		report	Shaw 29'; Hancock 42' (pen.); Sheehan 59'; Andrews 90'	Attendance: 104

=== Semi-finals ===
The four clubs to have made it through the quarter-finals were entered into the semi-finals draw. The draw for the semi-finals took place on 21 March 2013, with Cammell Laird from the Northern Premier League Division One North remaining as the lowest-placed team still in the Cup. Witton Albion was removed from the semi-finals due to fielding an ineligible player on 19 February 2013 against F.C. United of Manchester since the player had already represented Curzon Ashton in a previous round on 27 November 2012. Curzon Ashton was reinstated to play Matlock Town in place of Witton Albion in the semi-finals.

3 April 2013 63	North Ferriby United	2–1	Cammell Laird	Grange Lane, North Ferriby
19:45	Gray 19'; Wilson 81'	Report	Dysart 45'	Attendance: 148

4 April 2013 64	Matlock Town	1–2	Curzon Ashton	Causeway Lane, Matlock
19:45	Leesley 64'	Report	Gaughan 7' (o.g.); Metcalfe 79'	Attendance: 144

=== Final ===
The Challenge Cup Final was played at the Throstle Nest, the home ground of Farsley F.C. This was the second consecutive Challenge Cup Final for North Ferriby United and Curzon Ashton's first Finals appearance. After a 1–1 draw, North Ferriby United went on to win the penalty shoot-out and secure their second Challenge Cup in a row while also being the third team ever to retain the Cup.

23 April 2013
19:45 BST

Curzon Ashton	1 – 1 (a.e.t.)	North Ferriby United
Dennis 3'	Report 1 Report 2	Bradshaw 20'
Penalties
Kay (penalty missed); Dennis (penalty missed); Walker (penalty missed); Metcalfe (penalty scored); McDonagh (penalty missed)	1 – 2	Stokes (penalty missed); King (penalty missed); Bruce (penalty missed); Williams (penalty scored); Ombeni (penalty scored)

Throstle Nest, Farsley
Attendance: 179

== Peter Swales Shield ==
2013 Peter Swales Shield
King's Lynn Town	Skelmersdale United
1	6
- Date: 6 May 2013
- Venue: The Walks, King's Lynn
- Referee: S. Meredith (Mansfield)
- Attendance: 321

For the 2013 edition of the Peter Swales Shield, the 2012–13 champions of the Northern Premier League First Division North, Skelmersdale United, played against the 2012–13 champions of the Northern Premier League First Division South, King's Lynn Town.

6 May 2013

King's Lynn Town (2012–13 NPL Division One South Winners)	1–6	Skelmersdale United (2012–13 NPL Division One North Winners)
Thomson 64' (pen.)	Report	Mark Jackson 21'; Hine 24', 75', 86', 87'; Morning 36'

The Walks, King's Lynn, Norfolk
Attendance: 321
Referee: S. Meredith (Mansfield)

== See also ==
- 2012–13 Isthmian League
- 2012–13 Southern League
