= East Riding County Football Association =

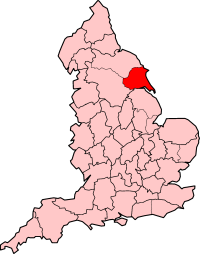
- Area shown in red
- Abbreviation: East Riding FA
- Formation: 1902
- Headquarters: Roy West Centre, Hull
- Location: East Riding of Yorkshire (historic)
- Coordinates: 53.4627°N 0.2203°W
- Chief Executive: Adam Lowthorpe
- Website: eastridingfa.com

The East Riding County Football Association is the governing body of football in the historic East Riding of Yorkshire (pre-1974), England. It runs a number of county cup competitions at different levels for its affiliated teams.

== History and organisation ==
Before the formation of the County, football in the area was under the jurisdiction of a Hull & District FA and the Scarborough & East Riding FA.

On 10 February 1902, the Football Association issued ‘the Recommendations of a Commission appointed to enquire into the position of the Yorkshire Associations’. The recommendations came into effect on 1 May 1902 forming the new East Riding of Yorkshire FA – “the area to be the East Riding of York. The present Hull and District Association to change its name and take control of the area.”

During the last 100 years, the County has administered football in the area with the stewardship in the hands of volunteers, with a steady increase in the number of clubs, but very few landmarks – the foremost possibly being the introduction of Sunday football in the early fifties.

However, the FA led expansion of football at all levels has seen dramatic changes in recent years. For the first time an office was set up with full-time paid staff – previously being administered from officers’ homes.

The Association became a Limited Company in 1999 and in 2001 a full-time Football Development Officer appointed.

The ECRFA are in the process of completing their new Headquarters built at Inglemire Lane.

== Affiliated leagues ==
=== Men's Saturday Leagues ===
- Humber Premier League
- East Riding Amateur League
- East Riding County League
- Driffield and District League

=== Men's Sunday Leagues ===
- Hull Sunday Men's League

=== Ladies and Girls Leagues ===
- East Riding Women's League
- East Riding Girls Football League

=== Youth Leagues ===
- East Yorkshire Junior League
- Hull Boys Sunday Football League

=== Other Leagues ===
- Hull and District Veterans League
- East Riding Pan Disability League

=== Small Sided Leagues ===
- Beverley Leisure Centre
- Beverley Soccer Sixes
- Bransholme Soccer Sixes (Champion Soccer)
- Bridlington 5-a-side (Football Mundial)
- Driffield Soccer Sixes (Champion Soccer)
- Hull Corporate 6 a side (Football Mundial)
  - Hull University
  - Kelvin Hall High School
- Hull City Fives
- Hull Grassroots
- North Ferriby Soccer Sixes (Champion Soccer)
- Warners

== Disbanded or amalgamated leagues ==
Leagues that were affiliated to the East Riding County FA but have disbanded or amalgamated with other leagues include:

- Driffield and District Minor League
- East Riding Church League
- South Holderness League

The East Riding County FA was founded in 1902, there was a ‘Scarborough and East Riding FA’ for 20 years before that.

THE EAST YORKSHIRE FOOTBALL ASSOCIATION WOLDS LEAGUE CUP 1902-03 WOLDS DISTRICT LEAGUE. A special meeting of the executive of the Wolds District (Association) League was held at Middleton, on

Saturday night, the Rev. F. Castallane in the chair. Mr. R. B. Soanes was elected hon. secretary, in the room of the Rev. J. Hare, who is leaving the district. Mr. Hugh Brooksbank, who has given a cup for competition, declined to have it named after him, and it was therefore decided to call it the Middleton and District Cup, The first round of the Cup-ties was to have been played on Saturday, but was postponed on account of the hard state of the ground.

== Affiliated member clubs ==
Among the notable clubs that are affiliated to the East Riding County FA are:

- Bridlington Town
- Goole
- Hall Road Rangers
- Hessle Rangers
- Hull City
- Hull United
- North Ferriby FC
- Westella & Willerby

== County Cup competitions ==
The East Riding County FA run the following Cup Competitions:

- Alf Bolder Memorial Youth U16 Cup
- David Whitton Memorial Trophy
- ERCFA Women's Cup
- Frank Varey/Dr Lilley U18s Cup
- Intermediate Country Cup
- Intermediate Cup
- Junior Country Cup
- President's Cup
- Qualifying Country Cup
- Qualifying Cup
- Senior Country Cup
- Senior Cup (Sponsored By Truckexport)
- Tesco Cup – Under 13s Boys
- Tesco Cup – Under 14s Girls
- Tesco Cup – Under 16s Girls
- Treasurer's Cup
- Vice President's Cup

== List of recent East Riding County Cup Winners ==
Season	Senior Cup	Senior Country Cup	Intermediate Cup	Intermediate Country Cup	Junior Country Cup	Qualifying Cup	Qualifying Country Cup
2005–06	Sculcoates Amateurs	Northfield Athletic		Elvington Harriers	Norton United		
2006–07	North Ferriby United	Dunnington	Smith & Nephew	Bridlington Sports Club	Long Riston Reserves		
2007–08	North Ferriby United	North Ferriby Athletic	St. Andrews Police Club	Wilberfoss	Dunnington Reserves	Sutton Park	Middleton Rovers
2008–09	North Ferriby United	Wilberfoss	Hall Road Rangers Reserves	Driffield Evening Institute	Dunnington Reserves	Park Athletic	Union Rovers (Norton)
2009–10	North Ferriby United	Riccall United	Kingburn Athletic	- -	- -	- -	- -
2010–11	North Ferriby United	FC Bridlington	Sculcoates Amateurs Reserves	- -	Dunnington Reserves	- -	- -
2011–12	Bridlington Town	Dunnington	Wawne United	- -	Malton & Norton	Stamford Bridge	- -
2012–13	North Ferriby United	Riccall United	Wawne United	- -	Hemingbrough United	Barmby Moor	- -
2013–14	North Ferriby United	Filey Town	AFC Rovers	- -	Dunnington Reserves	Cliffe	- -
2014–15	Bridlington Town	Dunnington	Park Athletic	- -	Hemingbrough United	FC Ridings	- -
2015-16	Bridlington Town	Hunmanby United	North Ferriby Athletic	- -	Malton & Norton	Withernsea AFC	- -

Source – The "Country" cups are only open to those clubs outside the boundaries of the city of Hull.

== Key officials ==
- Adam Lowthorpe (Chief Executive)
- Rachel Sullivan (Football Development Manager)
- Steve Lazenby (Designated Safeguarding Officer)
- Mark Brown (Referee Development Officer)
