= List of Scarborough Athletic F.C. seasons =

Scarborough Athletic Football Club is an association football club based in Scarborough, North Yorkshire, England. The club currently play in the National League North, the sixth tier of the English football league system. The club was formed on 25 June 2007 as a phoenix club following the winding up of Scarborough Football Club.

== Key ==
Top scorer and number of goals scored shown in bold when he was also top scorer for the division.

Key to league record

- Lvl = Level of the league in the current league system
- S = Numbers of seasons
- Pld = Games played
- W = Games won
- D = Games drawn
- L = Games lost
- GF = Goals for
- GA = Goals against
- GD = Goals difference
- Pts = Points
- Position = Position in the final league table
- Overall position = Overall club position in the English league system
- Average home attendance = for league games only

Key to cup records

- Res = Final reached round
- Rec = Final club record in the form of wins-draws-losses
- PR = Premilinary round
- QR1 = Qualifying round 1
- QR2 = Qualifying round 2
- QR3 = Qualifying round 3
- QR4 = Qualifying round 4
- R1 = Round 1
- R2 = Round 2
- R3 = Round 3
- R4 = Round 4
- R5 = Round 5
- R6 = Round 6
- QF = Quarter-finals
- SF = Semi-finals
- RU = Runners-up
- W = Winners

== Seasons ==
Year	League														Cup competitions					Manager
Year	Division	Lvl	Pld	W	D	L	GF	GA	GD	Pts	Position	Leading league scorer		Average attendance	FA Cup		FA Trophy		North Riding Senior Cup	Manager
Year	Division	Lvl	Pld	W	D	L	GF	GA	GD	Pts	Position	Name	Goals	Average attendance	Res	Rec	Res	Rec	North Riding Senior Cup	Manager
Club formed after Scarborough was liquidated at the end of the 2006–07 season.
2007–08	**Northern Counties East League**; **Division One**	10	32	18	7	7	80	45	+35	55 (Note: Six points deducted)	**5th of 17**	Scott Phillips; Ryan Blott	18	485	-		-		SF	Brian France
2008–09	**Northern Counties East League**; **Division One**	10	36	29	5	2	121	24	+97	92	**1st of 19**	Ryan Blott	34	493	-		FA Vase R4	5-0-0	R1	Brian France
2009–10	**Northern Counties East League**; **Premier Division**	9	38	22	4	12	100	57	+43	70	**5th of 20**	Scott Phillips	21	435	EPR	0-0-1	FA Vase QR2	0-0-1	QF	Brian France
2010–11	**Northern Counties East League**; **Premier Division**	9	38	15	9	14	69	61	+8	54	**10th of 22**	Ryan Blott	22	415	PR	1-0-1	FA Vase R3	4-2-1	R1	Brian France; Paul Olsson; Rudy Funk
2011–12	**Northern Counties East League**; **Premier Division**	9	38	23	5	10	96	50	+46	74	**3rd of 20**	Ryan Blott	34	419	QR1	2-1-1	FA Vase R1	1-0-1	R1	Rudy Funk
2012–13	**Northern Counties East League**; **Premier Division**	9	42	30	9	3	129	49	+80	99	**1st of 22**	Ryan Blott	37	447	EPR	0-0-1	FA Vase R1	0-0-1	R1	Rudy Funk
2013–14	**Northern Premier League**; **Division One South**	8	40	18	7	15	73	57	+16	61	**7th of 21**	Gary Bradshaw	21	384	QR2	2-2-0	QR3	3-1-1	QF	Rudy Funk
2014–15	**Northern Premier League**; **Division One North**	8	42	23	6	13	80	61	+19	75	**6th of 22**	Gary Bradshaw	18	402	QR2	1-3-1	QR1	0-0-1	SF	Rudy Funk; Paul Foot & Bryan Hughes
2015–16	**Northern Premier League**; **Division One North**	8	42	10	8	24	40	64	−24	38	**20th of 22**	Tom Corner	10	332	PR	0-0-1	PR	0-0-1	SF	Paul Foot & Bryan Hughes; Steve Kittrick
2016–17	**Northern Premier League**; **Division One North**	8	42	22	7	13	70	47	+23	73	**3rd of 22**	Benny Igiehon	14	395	PR	0-0-1	PR	0-0-1	QF	Steve Kittrick
2016–17	**Northern Premier League**; **Division One North**	8	Lost in the play-off semi-final.												PR	0-0-1	PR	0-0-1	QF	Steve Kittrick
2017–18	**Northern Premier League**; **Division One North**	8	42	30	5	7	101	42	+59	95	**2nd of 22**	**Michael Coulson**	**33**	1,106	QR4	4-2-1	PR	0-0-1	F	Steve Kittrick
2018–19	**Northern Premier League**; **Premier Division**	7	40	18	7	15	70	56	+14	61	**8th of 21**	**James Walshaw**	**25**	1,091	QR1	0-1-1	QR1	0-0-1	W	Steve Kittrick; John Deacey
2019–20	**Northern Premier League**; **Premier Division**	7	35	14	8	13	44	47	−3	50	8th of 22	James Walshaw	17	1,001	QR2	1-1-1	QR1	0-0-1	SF	John Deacey; Darren Kelly
2019–20	**Northern Premier League**; **Premier Division**	7	The season was declared null and void due to COVID-19												QR2	1-1-1	QR1	0-0-1	SF	John Deacey; Darren Kelly
2020–21	**Northern Premier League**; **Premier Division**	7	6	2	2	2	7	6	+1	8	11th of 22	Nathan Cartman	5	600	QR1	0-0-1	-		-	Darren Kelly
2020–21	**Northern Premier League**; **Premier Division**	7	The season was declared null and void due to COVID-19												QR1	0-0-1	-		-	Darren Kelly
2021–22	**Northern Premier League**; **Premier Division**	7	42	21	11	10	61	48	+13	74	**3rd of 22**	Luca Colville	11	1,145	QR1	0-0-1	QR3	0-0-1	W	Jonathan Greening
2021–22	**Northern Premier League**; **Premier Division**	7	Promoted after winning the play-offs.												QR1	0-0-1	QR3	0-0-1	W	Jonathan Greening
2022–23	**National League North**	6	46	18	14	14	74	69	+5	68	**8th of 24**	Michael Coulson	14	1,687	QR3	1-1-1	R2	0-0-1	W	Jonathan Greening
2023–24	**National League North**	6	46	18	10	18	53	55	-2	64	**13th of 24**	Harry Green	11	1,663	R1	3-3-2	R2	0-0-1	QF	Jonathan Greening
2024–25	**National League North**	6	46	16	13	17	64	58	+6	61	**13th of 24**	Dom Tear	11	1,399	R1	3-1-1	R2	0-0-1	W	Jonathan Greening
2025–26	**National League North**	6	37	15	12	10	51	44	+7	57	**6th of 24**	Stephen Walker	16	811 (Note: Home games being played at Bridlington Town due to work being undertaken at the home ground in Scarborough.)	QR2	0-0-1	R2	0-0-1	QF	Jonathan Greening

== Notes ==
- Source: Scarborough Athletic at the Football Club History Database
