= Jamie Barnwell-Edinboro =

English footballer (born 1975)

Personal information
- Date of birth: 26 December 1975 (age 50)
- Place of birth: Hull, England
- Position: Forward

Team information
- Current team: Hull United

Senior career*
Years	Team	Apps	(Gls)
1994–1996	Coventry City	1	(0)
1995	→ Swansea City (loan)	4	(0)
1996	→ Wigan Athletic (loan)	10	(1)
1996–1998	Cambridge United	63	(12)
1997	→ Rushden & Diamonds (loan)	5	(3)
1998–1999	Stevenage Borough		
1999	Doncaster Rovers	11	(1)
–	Goole		
–	Scarborough		
–	Hinckley United		
–	Brigg Town		
–	North Ferriby United		
–	Denaby United		
–	Hall Road Rangers		
2010	Scarborough Athletic		
2010–	Hall Road Rangers		
2014–	Hull United		
- * Club domestic league appearances and goals

Jamie Barnwell-Edinboro (born 26 December 1975), also known as Jamie Barnwell, is an English footballer who played in the Premier League for Coventry City and in the Football League for Swansea City, Wigan Athletic and Cambridge United. He played as a forward. He went on to play for a number of non-League football clubs, most recently for Hall Road Rangers whom he rejoined in October 2010. He now is one of the leading coaches at Bishop Burton College, mainly taking the Men's 1st Team while assisting Andy Norfolk (non-league legend) in the Men's Academy.
