= Hull United A.F.C. =

Association football club in England

Coordinates: 53.797892°N 0.366858°W

- Full name: Hull United Association Football Club
- Nickname: The Citizens
- Founded: 2005; 21 years ago (as St Andrew's Police Club)
- Ground: Haworth Park, Hull
- Capacity: 1,250
- Chairman: John Duffill
- Manager: Reon Potts
- League: Humber Premier League Premier Division
- 2025–26: Humber Premier League Premier Division, 13th of 15
- Website: https://hullutd.com/
Home colours	Away colours

Hull United Association Football Club is a football club in Hull, East Riding of Yorkshire, England. They were members of Division One of the Northern Counties East League after they were granted promotion from the Humber Premier League in the 2014–15 season, only to be demoted after just a single season. They are currently members of the Humber Premier League Premier Division. They play at Haworth Park having formerly played at Dene Park and KC Lightstream Stadium.

== History ==
=== Early years and successes ===
The club was formed in 1993 as St Andrews Police Club, and were founder members of Division One of the Humber Premier League. In 2007–08 the club won Division One, earning promotion to the Premier Division. In 2009 they changed their name to St Andrews, and then to Hull United in 2014, when the club was rebranded after Jamie Waltham and ex-pro Jamie Barnwell-Edinboro joined up with John Duffill and Kenny Sayers, adopting a new nickname ("the Citizens") and changing their kit colours to black and white, echoing Hull City's original kit, although this is widely seen as a common misconception.

Originally based at East Mount Recreation Centre, following their re-branding as Hull United the club moved to Dene Park, located in the village of Dunswell on the northern outskirts of Hull. The ground was originally the home of fellow Northern Counties East League side Hall Road Rangers F.C., who continued to share the ground with United before relocating to Haworth Park ahead of the 2015–16 season. On 15 August 2015 the club renamed the ground the "Breathe for Cameron Stadium" after local child, Cameron Good, who had died due to asthmatic complications during a football match he was involved in. In January 2015 the club appointed Curtis Woodhouse as manager, replacing chairman/first team manager Jamie Waltham, with fellow ex-Hull City teammate Ian Ashbee also joining as his assistant. One of the club's biggest matches came in March 2015 when they played Hull City Under-21s in the East Riding Senior Cup, beating them 3–2. Following this win, they progressed to the final where they met Bridlington Town at the KC Stadium with Bridlington eventually winning 4–2. After the club finished as Humber Premier Division runners-up at the end of the 2014–15 season, they were admitted to Division One of the Northern Counties East League. It was announced in June 2015 that assistant manager Ian Ashbee was taking over as club chairman, combining the two roles.

=== 2015–16 ===
Hull United opened their new campaign with a 1–0 win over Yorkshire Amateur A.F.C. on 8 August 2015. The next game resulted in a 1–0 defeat at Teversal F.C. in the League Cup. However, they returned to league action with a 3–0 win over Dronfield Town F.C. a few days later, their first home game of the season, which attracted a crowd of 617. They kept up their good league form for the rest of the month, recording wins against Penistone, Westella VIP and a 7–0 thrashing of Grimsby Borough, as well as a draw at Hemsworth. This good run of form continued into September as they beat A.F.C. Emley and lead Glasshoughton Welfare before the game was abandoned early in the second half due to floodlight failure. A few days later they travelled to Selby Town and won 3–1, which meant after 8 games United sat 3 points clear at the top of the league and remained unbeaten.

On 30 September 2015 it was revealed founder of the club and former chairman, Jamie Waltham would no longer be working with the club. Following this, their game against A.F.C. Mansfield was postponed due to being locked out of Dene Park by Jamie Waltham after he and the club were unable to agree on a lease to play there. This prompted the club to find another home. On 21 October the new ground was revealed to be the KC Lightstream Stadium, home of Hull Kingston Rovers. United started life at their new home with a 2–1 victory over Bottesford Town F.C. in the re-arranged fixture from earlier in the season. The game attracted a crowd of 431.

1 December saw the first competitive local derby against city rivals Hall Road Rangers, nicknamed the 'Hull Clasico'. The match ended 1–0 to United after a winning goal scored in the last seconds of the game. On 21 December it was announced that Gary Bradshaw had signed for the club from nearby Scarborough Athletic. His debut came in the second Hull derby against Hall Road on Boxing Day at Haworth Park; however, the game ended in defeat for United after another winner in the dying seconds of the game, this time for Hall Road as it ended 2–1. They started 2016 with a 2–1 win against Winterton at the KC Lightstream Stadium, with Gary Bradshaw also getting his first goal for the club. This was to be their last game here as on 13 January the club announced it would no longer be playing at the stadium due to being unable to afford the match-day running costs.

On 15 January former North Ferriby captain and Scarborough Athletic player/manager Paul Foot signed for the club, joining up with fellow ex-Ferriby legend Gary Bradshaw once more. It was revealed on 22 January that the club had made a request to groundshare with Brigg Town; however, this was rejected by the league, meaning United would have to play their remaining games away until the end of the season or until a suitable ground could be found. Following this they were deducted 3 points after fielding a suspended player against Hallam F.C. earlier in the season, a game they won 2–0. They played their first game in a month on 2 February, after four games in January were postponed, beating Grimsby Borough 2–1 away, with Paul Foot scoring on his debut.

The following game took place almost two weeks later on 13 February and saw them face North Ferriby in the East Riding Senior Cup for the first ever time. The game was played at South Hunsley School in Melton, just outside of Hull, and ended 2–1 to Ferriby, who fielded a reserve side, knocking United out of the cup. On 31 March manager Curtis Woodhouse left the club but was persuaded to re-join until the end of the season just a couple of days later, with Paul Foot taking charge of the game he missed. It was also confirmed on the club website that they had acquired a 10-year lease of the old Endeavour School sports centre, as part of their recently formed partnership with Hull College, starting from the 2016–17 season.

As United were hit hard by an 18-point deduction for three instances of player irregularities and an inability to obtain a ground/ground-share agreement for next season by 31 March deadline, on 21 April the Northern Counties East League decided to relegate them to a lower league designated by the FA as they have not "received a grading certificate by 31st March and not having an alternative proposal approved at the relevant Board Meeting" and as a consequence for this failure. Eight days later Craig Tock was introduced as the club's new chief executive officer, replacing John Duffill.

After a statement was released from the club, it was revealed they will be participating in the Humber Premier League Division one from the 2016–17 season, with Ian Ashbee leaving his role as chairman and Curtis Woodhouse resigning as first team manager. On 5 July 2016 Hull United appointed Ashley Moon as the new chairman and John Duffill as the Vice Chairman.

=== Humber Premier League ===
After leaving the NCEL they were placed in Division One of the Humber Premier League, two leagues below. 2016–17 proved to be a difficult season for United after starting again with virtually no players. John Duffill took on the role of first team head coach and managed to put a side together to start the season. They eventually finished second-from-bottom, one point above Hessle Sporting.

The 2017–18 season saw an upturn in the Citizens' fortunes, after acquiring a number of players and staff from Hanson Jewellers who played the previous season in the league above, as well as several players returning from previous successful seasons for United. Positive results which started off the season continued throughout the campaign, keeping them in promotion contention, and also saw a good cup run in which they reached the semi-final of the Humber Premier League Cup against Pocklington, which they lost 2–0. They achieved promotion after finishing 2nd place.

2018–19 saw the team competing in the Humber Premier League Premier Division once again, but it was a difficult start for them as they won only one of their opening 7 games, drawing one and losing 5. However, after a couple of experienced additions to the squad they managed to turn things around. They finished the season in 5th position; however, their main success came in the Humber Premier League cup, winning the final on penalties after holding Chalk Lane to a draw in normal time, with Chalk Lane hoping to win the league and cup double for a second season in a row. This was United's second cup win since their rebrand in 2014, after winning it in their first season in 2014–15. They also reached the quarter final of the East Riding Senior Cup once again playing Chalk Lane but lost 2–1.

The following season 2019–20 brought a rather mixed campaign in terms on league form, with lack of consistency being a big problem. Once again there were impressive cup runs though, in both the East Riding Senior Cup, with wins against East Hull and Hemingborough setting up a semi-final tie against North Ferriby F.C., and the Whitehead's Cup where they were unable to retain the trophy after a semi-final defeat against Pocklington. The season was declared null and void in March 2020, along with all other non-league football from step 7 down due to the COVID-19 pandemic.

The 2020–21 campaign saw changes to the ownership of the club, after successfully registering as a Community Benefit Society, memberships can be obtained on the club website with an option of 2020 Club Membership, costing an annual fee of £20.20, or club owner with an annual fee of £1, the minimum amount a club can charge for a membership with one of the club's objectives being affordable football for all. This was considered the best option to push forward the three main objectives while ensuring no one person can control the club, the club would benefit the community and all members would have limited liability. By December 2020, the club reached 100 owners with 30 being 2020 members, 72 club owner members and four junior members. On the pitch, however, the new season was still being affected by the COVID-19 pandemic with various restrictions and two separate lockdowns preventing a continuous run of games. After 4 months of no action the league resumed in April and Hull United returned with a 7–1 thrashing of Walkington, followed by a narrow 1–0 defeat by South Cave; however, they won their next 5 games before finishing the season with a 3–3 draw away to Pocklington, with a final position of 4th place after playing just 15 games.

After a positive finish to the previous season, the 2021–22 campaign went from bad to worse. With several of the main starting 11 moving on, United struggled to put out a strong team week after week, and with no permanent 1st choice keeper for much of the season, conceded a lot of goals. The first point of the season came after a 4–4 draw with Cherry Burton in December, with the first league win not coming until February when they beat Hessle Rangers 8–3. United finished bottom of the table with only 2 wins and 2 draws; however, they avoided relegation due to other teams folding and a major shortage of teams in the league.

The start of the 22–23 season had a more positive feel to it, with a changed club crest and investment in new playing shirts, training wear and equipment in a hope to attract new players, the club managed to bring in several new players as well as holding on to some of the more established players from the previous years. The club made appointments to the back-room staff too with the vastly experienced Richard Smales appointed to the board after a vote was put out to all club owners. Manager John Duffill opted to appoint a new 1st team captain, long serving player Tresor Kalilwa, in a bid to refresh the culture, mentality and morale following the disappointment of last season. After a good start to the season, which included a surprise 6–2 win over champions Hedon Rangers, United were drawn against Hull City U23s in the East Riding Senior Cup but were beaten 4–0 in a spirited display. The 2nd half of the season failed to live up to expectations with only 1 win in 15 games coming against St Mary's in January. The club continued its growth off the pitch though, after long negotiations and with news of Hall Road Rangers vacating Haworth Park and effectively folding at the end of the season, Hull United agreed to take on the lease and would call it their home from the 23–24 season.

A new era started with the addition of former player Ben Kinsley to the management team and several new signings made during the course of pre-season. It was a largely disappointing start to the season with the first 8 games only resulting in 2 wins and a Whiteheads Cup victory, though this was only through penalties. Kinsley left the club after 8 games. United were languishing near the bottom of the table for the majority of the campaign with a real threat of relegation. The first Haworth Park Derby vs fellow tenants LIV Supplies went the way of the latter as United slumped to a disappointing 3–1 defeat. However, with both clubs facing the prospect of finishing in the bottom 2, United's final game of the season was against LIV, this time beating them 2–1, and securing safety and an 11th-place finish.

The 24–25 season proved to be a real mixed bag in terms of results, with the first victory not coming until game 7 vs Hessle Rangers. The following 10 games would result in 5 victories for The Citizens, including perhaps one of the biggest East Riding Senior Cup shock results, as United travelled to Bridlington Town A.F.C., the current holders of the cup who also play three divisions above United. The game finished 2–2 after 90 minutes after twice coming back from behind with goals from Attila Filep & former Tottenham Hotspur & Kilmarnock striker Souleymane Coulibaly. Goalkeeper Harry Milner came off injured during the game and with no back-up keeper, defender David Brooke, who had effectively retired following the 22–23 season, made his comeback off the bench to go in between the sticks. As the game went to penalties, Brooke pulled off 2 saves and United won 5–4 on penalties, sparking huge celebrations from everyone involved with The Citizens. On 6 February manager John Duffill announced his intention to step down at the end of the season having been in the role for 9 years. Third of March saw the club announce his replacement in the form of long serving player Lewis Poucher, who in turn would be stepping down as Women's First Team Manager at the conclusion of the season. Some disappointing league results was to follow; however, victory against Hessle Sporting in the Senior Cup set up a semi-final against NCEL Premier Division side Beverley Town. History was to repeat itself as the huge underdogs in United managed to end the 90 minutes at 2–2, with goals from Jordan Spamer & Mike Rustill, to set up a penalty shoot out which The Citizens won 4–3 to claim another scalp and book their place in the final.

== Stadium ==
Hull United started at Dene Park, Dunswell, which was owned by co-founder Jamie Waltham, this was also home to Hall Road Rangers for many years before moving to their Haworth Park home. The club consistently brought in big attendances during their time here, usually being at least three figures. After some disagreements and the departure of Waltham, United were then unable to play their games at Dene Park and had to look elsewhere. United had a one-off home game at Roy West Centre, HQ of the East Riding FA where they beat Easington United 9–1 in a cup game.

Hull United announced a new home on 21 October 2015, Craven Park home of Super League side Hull Kingston Rovers in a huge move for the club. The first game was against Bottesford Town and attracted a crowd of 431 and the big derby against city rivals Hall Road Rangers drawing in 242. Attendances were not as high as first hoped, with just 67 turning out for a league match against Teversal F.C. and following the game against Winterton the club announced it would be leaving the stadium after just 2 months and 6 games played with the high match-day running costs being a big factor in this decision. A suitable ground could not be found within the city after this, and after a proposed groundshare with Brigg Town until the end of the season was turned down by the league, the club were then forced to play the rest of their home games at the grounds of their opposition, before being relegated out of the league after being unable to confirm a ground with the requited criteria before the deadline.

From 2016, the club played its games at Steve Prescott Centre, the former sports facility of the closed down Endeavour High School. The centre had been taken over by Hull College and had undergone refurbishment including a huge development of the floodlit 3G pitch, which is where the team plays its games after 3 seasons playing on the grass pitch.

The club revealed on 30 January 2023 that after long negotiations, with the final decision being made after a vote sent out to club owners, they would be moving to Haworth Park as of the 2023/24 season on a long-term lease. The ground has a capacity of 1,250 with a seated stand for roughly 200. It also has a floodlit main pitch, several back pitches, and a main building which houses changing rooms, physio rooms and a clubhouse upstairs.

On 3 May 2023 plans for upgrades to the playing surfaces at Haworth Park were revealed after the club secured a significant amount of funding through grants from The Football Foundation.

== Players ==
=== Current squad ===
Note: Flags indicate national team as defined under FIFA eligibility rules; some limited exceptions apply. Players may hold more than one non-FIFA nationality.

No.	Pos.	Nation	Player
—	GK	ENG	Ewan Phillips
—	DF	ENG	Joel Westoby
—	DF	ENG	Tom Gillingwater
—	DF	ENG	Jack Gannon
—	DF	POR	Silvo Assuncao
—	DF	COD	Tresor Ntombo Kalilwa
—	DF	ENG	Alfie Jackman
—	DF	ENG	Danny Buttle
—	DF	ENG	Seb Vaux
—	DF	CMR	Gabby Nzeke
—	MF	ENG	Alfie Sutcliffe
—	MF	ENG	Callum Vernon (Vice-Captain)

No.	Pos.	Nation	Player
—	MF	ENG	Jack Mcilwaine
—	MF	ENG	Tom Williams
—	MF	BRA	Kalil Juny
—	MF	ENG	Leo Berriman
—	MF	ENG	Callum Staves
—	MF	ENG	Tom Pindar
—	FW	ENG	Alex Owen (Captain)
—	FW	ENG	Jack Roulston
—	FW	GHA	Owusu Oteng Sarpong
—	FW	ENG	Kian Salter
—	FW	GHA	Cedric Prempeh

=== Notable players ===
Former professionals to have played for the club include:

- Danny Clarke
- Jamie Barnwell-Edinboro
- Ian Ashbee
- Lawrie Dudfield
- Mark Greaves
- Martin Foster
- Matty Plummer
- Gary Bradshaw
- Paul Foot
- Souleymane Coulibaly

== Non-playing staff ==
Chairman: John Duffill
Chief Executive Officer: Lewis Poucher
Staff: Mike Smith
Administration Director: Steve White
Media & Marketing Director: Mel Marsden
Director of Football: Callum Staves
Safeguarding and Welfare: Claire Woodward

Manager: Reon Potts
Assistant Manager: Mehmet Basarir
Coach: Richard Sutcliffe
Coach: Steve White
Men's Team Captain: Alex Owen

== Women's team ==
On 8 June 2020, Hull United's social media accounts announced that the team would be setting up a women's team at level 6 in the pyramid, meaning that they would be able to compete in the Women's FA Cup.

With their first season being disrupted and cut short due to the COVID-19 pandemic, their second season proved to be a successful one having been crowned champions of the North East Regional Women's Football League Division One South with two games left to spare. They also reached the third round qualifying in the Women's FA Cup for the first time, eventually losing by penalties to Wakefield. They finished the season unbeaten in the league before winning the Women's East Riding Cup in the first ever women's final to be held at the MKM Stadium in front of a crowd of over 800.

Now playing in a higher league United found it tough and would start the season poorly with a draw on the opening day and 3 points from a walkover. Despite not picking up results, performances were improving week on week with new signings settling in, injured players returning, and adjusting to the step up in quality. A good cup run also kept spirits up with a convincing 3–1 against County League champions A.F.C. Preston and a 7–0 thrashing of Grimsby Town in the Women's FA Cup. United's league form finally started to improve with a 5–3 win against Sunderland West End in February with the final 7 games resulting in 3 more wins and 2 draws, as they finished the campaign 8th place with a respectable 18 points. Another East Riding Women's Cup final capped the season off, with United lifting the Cup once again after a 2–1 over Hull City Ladies Reserves.

In 2024 they retained the East Riding Women's Cup for a 3rd year in a row with a victory over North Ferriby Women. A slight improvement in the league campaign saw them finish on 21 points.

2024–25 proved to be the most difficult and challenging season for the ladies' team with key players moving on, as well as being blighted by injuries. Only a single league win throughout the whole season came away at York R.I; they did, however, reach their 4th East Riding Women's Cup final in a row, seeing off Beverley Women, South Cave Ladies and Chanterlands Ladies. It was A.F.C. Preston though who brought an end to the 3-year reign in the cup beating The Citizens 2–0 in the final. The club were to be relegated back to Division One of the North East Regional Women's Football League. Following the announcement of manager Lewis Poucher taking over the men's team managers position, on 5 May the club's social media channels announced the new Women's team manager would be that season's captain Chloe Robinson.

== Honours ==
=== League ===
Men's

- Humber Premier League
  - Runners-up (1): 2014–15
- Humber Premier League Division One
  - Runners-up (1): 2017–18

Women's

- North East Regional Women's Football League Division One South
  - Winners (1): 2021–22

=== Cup ===
Men's

- Humber Premier League Cup
  - Winners (3): 2014–15, 2018–19, 2025–26
- East Riding Senior Cup
  - Runners-up (2): 2014–15, 2024–25

Women's

- Women's East Riding Cup
  - Winners (3): 2021–22, 2022–23, 2023–24
  - Runners-up (1):2024–25
