= East Riding Senior Cup =

- Organiser(s): East Riding County FA
- Founded: 1903; 123 years ago
- Region: (East Riding of Yorkshire) East Riding
- Current champions: Bridlington Town
- Most championships: Hull City
- Website: East Riding FA

East Riding Senior Cup is the foremost football cup competition for teams affiliated to the East Riding County Football Association. Teams affiliated with East Riding County Football Association can enter the competition. Entry is mandatory for affiliated clubs in Premier League, English Football League, Northern Premier League, Northern Counties East Football League, Humber Premier League (Premier Division only) and York Minster Engineering League (Premier Division only).

Established in 1903, Hessle won the inaugural tournament after defeating Hull Albany 4–1 in the finals.

== Finals ==
This section lists every final of the competition played since 1903–04, the winners, the runners-up, and the result.

=== Key ===
Match went to a replay
Match went to extra time
Match decided by a penalty shootout after extra time
Shared trophy

Season	Winners	Result	Runner-up	Venue	Referee	Notes
1903–04	Hessle	4–1	Hull Albany	The Boulevard		
1904–05	Filey Town	3–0	Hessle	Dairycoates		
1905–06	Beverley Town	3–0	Hull Botanic Swifts	Anlaby Road		
1906–07	Hull City	3–0	Beverley Old	Anlaby Road		
1907–08	Hull Day Street Old Boys	4–1	Filey	Dairycoates		
1908–09	Hull Day Street Old Boys	3–2	Beverley Old	Dairycoates		
1909–10	Hull Oriental	3–0	Beverley Old	Dairycoates		
1910–11	Hull City	3–1	Reckitts	Anlaby Road		
1911–12	1st Bn East Yorkshire Regiment	2–1	Beverley Town	Anlaby Road		Replay. First match 1–1.
1912–13	Beverley Town	3–0	1st Bn East Yorkshire Regiment	Anlaby Road		
1913–14	Tivoli	3–1	Sutton	Anlaby Road		Replay. First match 2–2.
1914–1919	No competition due to World War I.					
1982–83	Aaro Albion	3–1	North Ferriby United	Boothferry Park		Replay. First match 3–3.
1983–84	Schultz Youth Club	1–0	Hull City Juniors	Boothferry Park		
1984–85	Hull City reserves	3–2	North Ferriby United	Boothferry Park		
1985–86	Schultz Youth Club	2–1	Bridlington Town	Boothferry Park		
1986–87	Hull City reserves	3–1	Bridlington Town	Boothferry Park		
1987–88	Hull City reserves	2–0	Bridlington Town	Boothferry Park		
1988–89	Bridlington Town	1–0	Hull City reserves	Boothferry Park		
1989–90	Hull City reserves	7–1	Bridlington Town	Boothferry Park		
1990–91	North Ferriby United	0–0	Hull City reserves	Grange Lane		North Ferriby won replay by default.
1992–93	Bridlington Town	3–1	North Ferriby United			
1993–94	Hall Road Rangers	1–0	Sculcoates Amateurs	Boothferry Park		
1994–95	Sculcoates Amateurs	2–1	Hall Road Rangers	Boothferry Park		
1995–96	AFC Reckitts	2–1	Hall Road Rangers	Grange Lane		
1996–97	North Ferriby United	3–0	Filey Town	Boothferry Park		
1997–98	North Ferriby United	2–1	Hull City reserves	Boothferry Park		
1998–99	North Ferriby United	5–1	Filey Town	Boothferry Park		
1999–2000	North Ferriby United	2–1	Hall Road Rangers	Queensgate		
2001–02	North Ferriby United	2–0	Bridlington Town	Boothferry Park		
2002–03	North Ferriby United	3–1	Bridlington Town	KC Stadium		
2007–08	North Ferriby United	3–1	Hall Road Rangers	KC Stadium		
2008–09	North Ferriby United	3–1	Bridlington Town	KC Stadium		
2009–10	North Ferriby United	3–2	Bridlington Town	KC Stadium		After extra-time.
2010–11	North Ferriby United	3–1	Hall Road Rangers	KC Stadium		
2011–12	Bridlington Town	9–2	Hall Road Rangers reserves	KC Stadium		
2012–13	North Ferriby United	2–1	AFC Reckitts	KC Stadium		
2013–14	North Ferriby United	5–2	Bridlington Town	Roy West Centre		
2014–15	Bridlington Town	4–2	Hull United	KC Stadium		
2015–16	Bridlington Town	1–0	North Ferriby United	KC Stadium		
2016–17	Bridlington Town	4–2	Hull City	Haworth Park		
2017–18	Hull City	2–1	Bridlington Town	Roy West Centre		
2018–19	Bridlington Town	3–1	Hull City	Roy West Centre		
2019–20	Competition abandoned due to COVID-19 pandemic.					
2020–21	Competition abandoned due to COVID-19 pandemic.					
2021–22	L.I.V Supplies	3–1	Pocklington Town	MKM Stadium	Garry Fletcher-Tindall	
2022–23	Bridlington Town	3–2	Hedon Rangers	The Dransfield Stadium	Michael Robinson	
2023–24	Bridlington Town	2–1	North Ferriby	The Dransfield Stadium	Mathew Wright	
2024-25	Great Driffield	2-0	Hull United	Mounting Systems Stadium, Bridlington	Luke Tompkins	
2025-26	Bridlington Town	4-0	Great Driffield	Versa Sportswear Stadium	Kieran Kent	

== 2023-24 Current Participating teams ==
Club	Level	League
Beverley Town	10	Northern Counties East Football League Division One
Bridlington Town	8	Northern Premier League Division One East
Cherry Burton	11	Humber Premier League Premier Division
Dunnington	11	York Football League Premier Division
East Riding Rangers	11	Humber Premier League Premier Division
Hedon Rangers	11	Humber Premier League Premier Division
Hessle Rangers CIC	11	Humber Premier League Premier Division
Hessle Sporting Club	11	Humber Premier League Premier Division
Hornsea Town	11	Humber Premier League Premier Division
Hull City U21's	Academy	Professional Development League North
Hull United Seniors	11	Humber Premier League Premier Division
L.I.V Supplies	11	Humber Premier League Premier Division
North Ferriby	8	Northern Premier League Division One East
Pocklington Town	11	Humber Premier League Premier Division
Reckitts	11	Humber Premier League Premier Division
Sculcoates Amateurs	11	Humber Premier League Premier Division
South Cave United	11	Humber Premier League Premier Division
St Mary's	11	Humber Premier League Premier Division
