= 2014–15 FA Trophy =

FA Challenge Trophy

Tournament details
- Country: England; Guernsey; Wales
- Teams: 275

Final positions
- Champions: North Ferriby United
- Runners-up: Wrexham

The 2014–15 FA Trophy was the 45th season of the FA Trophy, the Football Association's cup competition for teams at levels 5–8 of the English football league system. A total of 275 clubs entered the competition, which was won by Conference North club North Ferriby United after beating Conference team Wrexham in the final on 29 March 2015. Competition ran one club shorter than usual after Conference South club Salisbury City was disbanded before the season started, thus one club were to get a bye in the third round qualifying.

== Calendar ==
Round	Main date	Number of fixtures	Clubs	New entries this round	Prize money
Preliminary round	18 October 2014	64	275 → 211	128	£2,500
First round qualifying	1 November 2014	72	211 → 139	80	£2,700
Second round qualifying	15 November 2014	36	139 → 103	none	£3,250
Third round qualifying	29 November 2014	40	103 → 64	43	£4,000
First round proper	13 December 2014	32	64 → 32	24	£5,000
Second round proper	10 January 2015	16	32 → 16	none	£6,000
Third round proper	24 January 2015	8	16 → 8	none	£7,000
Fourth round proper	7 February 2015	4	8 → 4	none	£8,000
Semi-finals	21 February; 28 February 2015	2	4 → 2	none	£16,000
Final	29 March 2015	1	2 → 1	none	Runner-up £25,000; Winner £50,000

== Preliminary round ==
A total of 128 clubs, from Level 8 of English football, entered preliminary round of the competition. Eight clubs from level 8 get a bye to the first round qualifying - Barkingside, Bishop's Cleeve, Carlton Town, Evesham United, Farsley, Merstham, Scarborough Athletic and Worthing. The matches were played on 18 October 2014.

Tie	Home team (tier)	Score	Away team (tier)	Att.
1	Salford City (8)	1–2	Prescot Cables (8)	252
2	Brigg Town (8)	0–0	Padiham (8)	
replay	Padiham (8)	4–2	Brigg Town (8)	116
3	Lancaster City (8)	1–1	Bamber Bridge (8)	203
replay	Bamber Bridge (8)	5–1	Lancaster City (8)	207
4	Harrogate Railway Athletic (8)	2–3	Spennymoor Town (8)	241
5	Clitheroe (8)	3–2	Droylsden (8)	220
6	Brighouse Town (8)	0–1	Ossett Town (8)	
7	Radcliffe Borough (8)	0–2	Darlington 1883 (8)	185
8	New Mills (8)	2–1	Ossett Albion (8)	
9	Stocksbridge Park Steels (8)	3–4	Sheffield (8)	158
10	Warrington Town (8)	1–2	Mossley (8)	131
11	Kendal Town (8)	1–2	Northwich Victoria (8)	152
12	Burscough (8)	0–1	Goole (8)	139
13	Kettering Town (8)	2–1	Lincoln United (8)	
14	Coalville Town (8)	1–4	Mickleover Sports (8)	119
15	Gresley (8)	2–0	Tividale (8)	262
16	Newcastle Town (8)	2–0	Sutton Coldfield Town (8)	102
17	Soham Town Rangers (8)	1–6	Spalding United (8)	117
18	Chasetown (8)	5–0	Norton United (8)	142
19	St Ives Town (8)	0–1	Stratford Town (8)	
20	Rugby Town (8)	0–1	Stafford Rangers (8)	263
21	Market Drayton Town (8)	2–2	Rainworth Miners Welfare (8)	
replay	Rainworth Miners Welfare (8)	0–3	Market Drayton Town (8)	
22	Romulus (8)	2–0	Daventry Town (8)	52
23	Leek Town (8)	5–2	Bedworth United (8)	
24	Loughborough Dynamo (8)	6–3	Kidsgrove Athletic (8)	93
25	Cray Wanderers (8)	2–0	Hastings United (8)	
26	Heybridge Swifts (8)	6–3	Herne Bay (8)	
27	Burgess Hill Town (8)	1–0	Aveley (8)	247
28	Whitstable Town (8)	1–3	AFC Sudbury (8)	
29	Horsham (8)	6–2	Sittingbourne (8)	
30	Three Bridges (8)	4–1	Carshalton Athletic (8)	123
31	North Greenford United (8)	0–1	Chatham Town (8)	63
32	Tooting & Mitcham United (8)	1–2	Aylesbury (8)	174
33	Cheshunt (8)	1–5	South Park (8)	85
34	Guernsey (8)	4–0	Barton Rovers (8)	608
35	Chalfont St Peter (8)	1–1	A.F.C. Hayes (8)	69
replay	A.F.C. Hayes (8)	0–1	Chalfont St Peter (8)	49

Tie	Home team (tier)	Score	Away team (tier)	Att.
36	Ware (8)	4–0	Great Wakering Rovers (8)	74
37	Thurrock (8)	4–3	Tilbury (8)	
38	Harlow Town (8)	5–2	Wroxham (8)	208
39	Walton Casuals (8)	0–0	East Grinstead Town (8)	70
replay	East Grinstead Town (8)	1–6	Walton Casuals (8)	52
40	Bedford Town (8)	4–3	Chipstead (8)	192
41	Northwood (8)	3–1	Waltham Abbey (8)	64
42	Romford (8)	1–1	Uxbridge (8)	88
replay	Uxbridge (8)	2–2 (4–3 p)	Romford (8)	75
43	Potters Bar Town (8)	2–2	Royston Town (8)	97
replay	Royston Town (8)	4–1	Potters Bar Town (8)	101
44	Leighton Town (8)	3–3	Corinthian-Casuals (8)	78
replay	Corinthian-Casuals (8)	1–3	Leighton Town (8)	70
45	Aylesbury United (8)	2–3	Thamesmead Town (8)	
46	Redbridge (8)	1–2	Whyteleafe (8)	
47	Ramsgate (8)	1–4	Folkestone Invicta (8)	257
48	Dereham Town (8)	2–1	Hanwell Town (8)	
49	Brentwood Town (8)	1–1	Redhill (8)	82
replay	Redhill (8)	1–2	Brentwood Town (8)	66
50	Beaconsfield Town (8)	0–4	Faversham Town (8)	70
51	Burnham Ramblers (8)	1–5	Brightlingsea Regent (8)	87
52	Hythe Town (8)	3–0	Maldon & Tiptree (8)	202
53	Needham Market (8)	1–3	Walton & Hersham (8)	
54	Wimborne Town (8)	3–2	Godalming Town (8)	
55	Tiverton Town (8)	2–0	Wantage Town (8)	201
56	Didcot Town (8)	3–1	Marlow (8)	100
57	Larkhall Athletic (8)	2–4	Shortwood United (8)	142
58	Cinderford Town (8)	1–1	AFC Totton (8)	
replay	AFC Totton (8)	3–1	Cinderford Town (8)	199
59	Egham Town (8)	2–1	Bridgwater Town (8)	72
60	Bashley (8)	0–1	Sholing (8)	
61	Swindon Supermarine (8)	1–2	Fleet Town (8)	70
62	Clevedon Town (8)	0–3	Mangotsfield United (8)	75
63	Yate Town (8)	1–2	North Leigh (8)	160
64	Taunton Town (8)	1–1	Merthyr Town (8)	
replay	Merthyr Town (8)	1–0	Taunton Town (8)	213

== First round qualifying ==
A total of 144 teams took part in this stage of the competition including 64 winners from the preliminary round, 72 teams from Level 7 of English football and eight teams from level 8, who get a bye in the previous round. The matches were played on 1 November 2014.

Tie	Home team (tier)	Score	Away team (tier)	Att.
1	Skelmersdale United (7)	0–2	Nantwich Town (7)	183
2	Sheffield (8)	0–1	Witton Albion (7)	153
3	New Mills (8)	3–2	Mossley (8)	152
4	Prescot Cables (8)	2–4	Goole (8)	134
5	Farsley (8)	0–2	Blyth Spartans (7)	183
6	Whitby Town (7)	1–2	Ramsbottom United (7)	233
7	F.C. United of Manchester (7)	2–0	Padiham (8)	624
8	Frickley Athletic (7)	0–2	Marine (7)	165
9	Scarborough Athletic (8)	0–4	Darlington 1883 (8)	715
10	Curzon Ashton (7)	0–0	Northwich Victoria (8)	158
replay	Northwich Victoria (8)	0–1	Curzon Ashton (7)	86
11	Buxton (7)	2–0	Ashton United (7)	272
12	Clitheroe (8)	0–2	Workington (7)	326
13	Ossett Town (8)	2–2	Trafford (7)	96
replay	Trafford (7)	3–0	Ossett Town (8)	91
14	Spennymoor Town (8)	3–1	Bamber Bridge (8)	396
15	St Neots Town (7)	2–1	Ilkeston (7)	330
16	Mickleover Sports (8)	3–2	Kettering Town (8)	364
17	Carlton Town (8)	1–1	Stourbridge (7)	106
replay	Stourbridge (7)	4–2	Carlton Town (8)	239
18	Corby Town (7)	0–1	Redditch United (7)	308
19	Loughborough Dynamo (8)	3–1	Grantham Town (7)	149
20	Belper Town (7)	2–3	Histon (7)	207
21	Halesowen Town (7)	1–1	Matlock Town (7)	293
replay	Matlock Town (7)	0–4	Halesowen Town (7)	173
22	Evesham United (8)	2–2	Banbury United (7)	268
replay	Banbury United (7)	1–0	Evesham United (8)	123
23	Gresley (8)	3–1	Romulus (8)	292
24	Stamford A.F.C. (7)	0–1	Barwell (7)	201
25	Chasetown (8)	2–1	Newcastle Town (8)	132
26	Rushall Olympic (7)	2–0	Cambridge City (7)	131
27	Market Drayton Town (8)	2–2	King's Lynn Town (7)	139
replay	King's Lynn Town (7)	5–1	Market Drayton Town (8)	387
28	Stratford Town (8)	1–0	Stafford Rangers (8)	347
29	Leek Town (8)	2–2	Spalding United (8)	
replay	Spalding United (8)	1–2	Leek Town (8)	
30	Aylesbury (8)	1–2	Merstham (8)	78
31	Walton Casuals (8)	2–4	Peacehaven & Telscombe (7)	72
32	Dulwich Hamlet (7)	3–0	Chalfont St Peter (8)	433
33	Thamesmead Town (8)	3–1	Three Bridges (8)	49
34	Metropolitan Police (7)	1–0	Billericay Town (7)	82
35	Whyteleafe (8)	3–1	Dunstable Town (7)	111
36	Maidstone United (7)	3–2	Walton & Hersham (8)	1,226
37	Bedford Town (8)	4–0	Brightlingsea Regent (8)	177

Tie	Home team (tier)	Score	Away team (tier)	Att.
38	Worthing (8)	1–1	Chatham Town (8)	232
replay	Chatham Town (8)	0–1	Worthing (8)	123
39	Horsham (8)	1–0	Ware (8)	172
40	Canvey Island (7)	1–1	Leatherhead (7)	248
replay	Leatherhead (7)	2–2 (6–5 p)	Canvey Island (7)	172
41	Folkestone Invicta (8)	3–2	Thurrock (8)	248
42	Margate (7)	0–2	Slough Town (7)	560
43	Arlesey Town (7)	2–1	Wingate & Finchley (7)	125
44	Uxbridge (8)	6–1	Hythe Town (8)	122
45	Brentwood Town (8)	1–1	Biggleswade Town (7)	130
replay	Biggleswade Town (7)	3–2	Brentwood Town (8)	70
46	Hampton & Richmond (7)	0–3	Grays Athletic (7)	269
47	Burgess Hill Town (8)	2–0	Chesham United (7)	258
48	Northwood (8)	2–2 (5–3 p)	Guernsey (8)	
49	Lewes (7)	1–0	Harlow Town (8)	358
50	Cray Wanderers (8)	3–0	Faversham Town (8)	131
51	VCD Athletic (7)	0–2	Tonbridge Angels (7)	156
52	Hungerford Town (7)	1–1	East Thurrock United (7)	152
replay	East Thurrock United (7)	4–2	Hungerford Town (7)	102
53	Dereham Town (8)	1–0	Enfield Town (7)	291
54	Bognor Regis Town (7)	2–2	AFC Sudbury (8)	325
replay	AFC Sudbury (8)	2–1	Bognor Regis Town (7)	149
55	Bury Town (7)	1–3	Hendon (7)	278
56	Royston Town (8)	1–2	Witham Town (7)	156
57	Burnham (7)	2–2	Hitchin Town (7)	
replay	Hitchin Town (7)	0–2	Burnham (7)	112
58	Barkingside (8)	3–1	Kingstonian (7)	214
59	South Park (8)	1–4	Heybridge Swifts (8)	112
60	Leiston (7)	2–2	Leighton Town (8)	166
replay	Leighton Town (8)	2–5	Leiston (7)	90
61	AFC Hornchurch (7)	2–0	Harrow Borough (7)	165
62	Mangotsfield United (8)	5–1	Bishop's Cleeve (8)	155
63	Sholing (8)	1–0	Tiverton Town (8)	139
64	AFC Totton (8)	1–2	Hereford United (7)	343
65	Truro City (7)	3–0	Egham Town (8)	
66	Poole Town (7)	3–1	North Leigh (8)	285
67	Paulton Rovers (7)	3–0	Fleet Town (8)	98
68	Chippenham Town (7)	3–1	Frome Town (7)	277
69	Merthyr Town (8)	2–0	Cirencester Town (7)	307
70	Weymouth (7)	1–0	Shortwood United (8)	420
71	Dorchester Town (7)	1–3	Wimborne Town (8)	315
72	Bideford (7)	3–3	Didcot Town (8)	
replay	Didcot Town (8)	2–1	Bideford (7)	134

== Second round qualifying ==
A total of 72 clubs took part in this stage of the competition, all winners from the first round qualifying. The matches were played on 15 November 2014.

Tie	Home team (tier)	Score	Away team (tier)	Att.
1	Chasetown (8)	4–1	Loughborough Dynamo (8)	129
2	Spennymoor Town (8)	3–3	Leek Town (8)	361
replay	Leek Town (8)	0–1	Spennymoor Town (8)	234
3	Rushall Olympic (7)	5–0	Stratford Town (8)	154
4	Blyth Spartans (7)	1–1	Halesowen Town (7)	489
replay	Halesowen Town (7)	2–0	Blyth Spartans (7)	470
5	St Neots Town (7)	3–1	Darlington 1883 (8)	715
6	Curzon Ashton (7)	1–2	Barwell (7)	148
7	Witton Albion (7)	3–3	Workington (7)	251
replay	Workington (7)	3–0	Witton Albion (7)	329
8	King's Lynn Town (7)	3–1	Stourbridge (7)	
9	Redditch United (7)	5–2	Trafford (7)	271
10	Gresley (8)	2–0	Goole (8)	349
11	F.C. United of Manchester (7)	2–0	Buxton (7)	1,002
12	Nantwich Town (7)	1–3	Ramsbottom United (7)	
13	Mickleover Sports (8)	A – A	New Mills (8)	
Tie abandoned after 68 mins due to fog, 1–1.
13	Mickleover Sports (8)	3–1	New Mills (8)	88
14	Banbury United (7)	3–2	Marine (7)	208
15	Hereford United (7)	2–0	Mangotsfield United (8)	
16	Witham Town (7)	0–1	Truro City (7)	
17	Dereham Town (8)	A – A	Sholing (8)	214
Tie abandoned after 73 mins due to fog, 1–1.
17	Dereham Town (8)	0–2	Sholing (8)	196

Tie	Home team (tier)	Score	Away team (tier)	Att.
18	Weymouth (7)	0–0	Burnham (7)	442
replay	Burnham (7)	0–0 (4–5 p)	Weymouth (7)	75
19	Maidstone United (7)	0–2	AFC Sudbury (8)	1,423
20	Metropolitan Police (7)	2–0 (a.e.t.)	Dulwich Hamlet (7)	150
21	Barkingside (8)	1–3	Horsham (8)	97
22	Peacehaven & Telscombe (7)	4–3	Thamesmead Town (8)	121
23	Lewes (7)	1–1	Heybridge Swifts (8)	258
replay	Heybridge Swifts (8)	2–3	Lewes (7)	119
24	Leiston (7)	3–2	Paulton Rovers (7)	185
25	Burgess Hill Town (8)	0–0	Folkestone Invicta (8)	334
replay	Folkestone Invicta (8)	0–1	Burgess Hill Town (8)	151
26	Slough Town (7)	1–1	Merthyr Town (8)	300
replay	Merthyr Town (8)	3–2	Slough Town (7)	310
27	Biggleswade Town (7)	1–2	Poole Town (7)	170
28	Uxbridge (8)	1–2	Didcot Town (8)	145
29	Bedford Town (8)	2–1	Chippenham Town (7)	203
30	Whyteleafe (8)	1–4	Leatherhead (7)	148
31	AFC Hornchurch (7)	4–2	Merstham (8)	154
32	Histon (7)	0–2	Cray Wanderers (8)	203
33	East Thurrock United (7)	4–4	Arlesey Town (7)	149
replay	Arlesey Town (7)	1–2	East Thurrock United (7)	89
34	Hendon (7)	4–0	Worthing (8)	173
35	Tonbridge Angels (7)	2–0	Grays Athletic (7)	343
36	Wimborne Town (8)	2–1	Northwood (8)	

== Third round qualifying ==
A total of 80 clubs took part in this stage of the competition, all winners from the second round qualifying and 43 clubs from Level 6 of English football. As Conference South club Salisbury City was disbanded before the season started, this stage was one team short. Leiston received a bye to the first round proper. The matches were played on 29 November 2014.

Tie	Home team (tier)	Score	Away team (tier)	Att.
1	Boston United (6)	2–1	Workington (7)	708
2	A.F.C. Fylde (6)	3–2	Hednesford Town (6)	251
3	Gainsborough Trinity (6)	2–1	Brackley Town (6)	264
4	Stockport County (6)	2–1	Colwyn Bay (6)	1,452
5	Bradford Park Avenue (6)	3–1	Leamington (6)	213
6	King's Lynn Town (7)	0–1	Harrogate Town (6)	719
7	Halesowen Town (7)	2–0	Gresley (8)	415
8	Worcester City (6)	3–0	Barrow (6)	568
9	Chorley (6)	2–2	Stalybridge Celtic (6)	717
replay	Stalybridge Celtic (6)	1–2	Chorley (6)	268
10	Tamworth (6)	3–4	Hyde (6)	482
11	North Ferriby United (6)	6–2	Mickleover Sports (8)	220
12	Spennymoor Town (8)	3–0	Chasetown (8)	440
13	Barwell (7)	1–1	F.C. United of Manchester (7)	420
replay	F.C. United of Manchester (7)	3–2	Barwell (7)	503
14	Solihull Moors (6)	2–1	Redditch United (7)	359
15	Guiseley (6)	0–0	Rushall Olympic (7)	342
replay	Rushall Olympic (7)	1–2	Guiseley (6)	139
16	Banbury United (7)	0–3	Ramsbottom United (7)	235
17	Sholing (8)	1–2	Farnborough (6)	224
18	Concord Rangers (6)	4–0	Boreham Wood (6)	202
19	Weymouth (7)	3–1	Cray Wanderers (8)	409
20	Merthyr Town (8)	3–3	Didcot Town (8)	348
replay	Didcot Town (8)	2–1	Merthyr Town (8)	176
21	Bedford Town (8)	0–0	Weston-super-Mare (6)	287
replay	Weston-super-Mare (6)	3–2 (a.e.t.)	Bedford Town (8)	155

Tie	Home team (tier)	Score	Away team (tier)	Att.
22	Hayes & Yeading United (6)	6–0	Horsham (8)	205
23	Oxford City (6)	6–1	Lewes (7)	162
24	Truro City (7)	1–2	Hemel Hempstead Town (6)	379
25	Tonbridge Angels (7)	0–0	Bromley (6)	547
replay	Bromley (6)	3–0	Tonbridge Angels (7)	408
26	Bishop's Stortford (6)	4–3	Chelmsford City (6)	522
27	Eastbourne Borough (6)	1–2	Lowestoft Town (6)	368
28	St Neots Town (7)	1–1	AFC Sudbury (8)	431
replay	AFC Sudbury (8)	1–0	St Neots Town (7)	229
29	Ebbsfleet United (6)	1–0	Hendon (7)	676
30	Maidenhead United (6)	2–1	Metropolitan Police (7)	252
31	Basingstoke Town (6)	2–0	Whitehawk (6)	268
32	Havant & Waterlooville (6)	2–1	East Thurrock United (7)	268
33	Peacehaven & Telscombe (7)	0–4	Gosport Borough (6)	188
34	Wimborne Town (8)	4–2	AFC Hornchurch (7)	
35	St Albans City (6)	1–1	Wealdstone (6)	457
replay	Wealdstone (6)	3–0	St Albans City (6)	324
36	Gloucester City (6)	0–0	Bath City (6)	425
replay	Bath City (6)	3–1 (a.e.t.)	Gloucester City (6)	291
37	Staines Town (6)	3–3	Poole Town (7)	261
replay	Poole Town (7)	1–1 (5–4 p)	Staines Town (6)	335
38	Burgess Hill Town (8)	3–2	Leatherhead (7)	301
39	Hereford United (7)	1–2	Sutton United (6)	494

== First round proper ==
A total of 64 clubs took part in this stage of the competition, all winners from the third round qualifying, one club that received a bye in the previous round and 24 teams from Level 5 of English football. The matches were played on 13 December 2014.

Tie	Home team (tier)	Score	Away team (tier)	Att.
1	Nuneaton Town (5)	0–2	Grimsby Town (5)	344
2	Hyde (6)	4–2	Spennymoor Town (8)	280
3	Altrincham (5)	1–0	Macclesfield Town (5)	1,276
4	A.F.C. Fylde (6)	3–0	Gainsborough Trinity (6)	215
5	Guiseley (6)	0–2	Chorley (6)	498
6	Lincoln City (5)	0–2	Alfreton Town (5)	1,243
7	North Ferriby United (6)	1–1	Boston United (6)	321
replay	Boston United (6)	0–2	North Ferriby United (6)	671
8	Gateshead (5)	2–0	Halesowen Town (7)	538
9	Worcester City (6)	0–1	FC Halifax Town (5)	760
10	Southport (5)	1–1	Wrexham (5)	654
replay	Wrexham (5)	2–0	Southport (5)	947
11	Ramsbottom United (7)	0–3	Stockport County (6)	907
12	Bradford Park Avenue (6)	1–4	Kidderminster Harriers (5)	159
13	AFC Telford United (5)	1–1	Chester (5)	776
replay	Chester (5)	1–1 3–4 p)	AFC Telford United (5)	898
14	F.C. United of Manchester (7)	4–0	Harrogate Town (6)	907
15	Aldershot Town (5)	0–1	Burgess Hill Town (8)	866
16	Weymouth (7)	1–1	Havant & Waterlooville (6)	512
replay	Havant & Waterlooville (6)	5–0	Weymouth (7)	208

Tie	Home team (tier)	Score	Away team (tier)	Att.
17	Bishop's Stortford (6)	0–5	Torquay United (5)	428
18	Lowestoft Town (6)	1–3	Dover Athletic (5)	575
19	Ebbsfleet United (6)	1–1	Welling United (5)	876
replay	Welling United (5)	2–3 (a.e.t.)	Ebbsfleet United (6)	616
20	Wealdstone (6)	1–0	Hayes & Yeading United (6)	
21	Wimborne Town (8)	0–3	Oxford City (6)	
22	Weston-super-Mare (6)	1–3	Farnborough (6)	
23	Dartford (5)	2–0	Solihull Moors (6)	513
24	Woking (5)	2–0	Eastleigh (5)	693
25	Hemel Hempstead Town (6)	1–0	Sutton United (6)	368
26	Basingstoke Town (6)	2–2	Gosport Borough (6)	290
replay	Gosport Borough (6)	2–1 (a.e.t.)	Basingstoke Town (6)	
27	Bromley (6)	2–0	Leiston (7)	413
28	Forest Green Rovers (5)	2–2	Didcot Town (8)	517
replay	Didcot Town (8)	0–3	Forest Green Rovers (5)	391
29	Bristol Rovers (5)	0–2	Bath City (6)	3,505
30	Maidenhead United (6)	2–1	Poole Town (7)	255
31	Braintree Town (5)	1–0	AFC Sudbury (8)	547
32	Concord Rangers (6)	0–0	Barnet (5)	318
replay	Barnet (5)	2–6	Concord Rangers (6)	354

== Second round proper ==
A total of 32 clubs took part in this stage of the competition, all winners from the first round. The matches were played on 10 January 2015.

Tie	Home team (tier)	Score	Away team (tier)	Att.
1	Chorley (6)	3–3	F.C. United of Manchester (7)	2,254
replay	F.C. United of Manchester (7)	1–0	Chorley (6)	1,393
2	Grimsby Town (5)	0–0	Gateshead (5)	1,185
replay	Gateshead (5)	3–2 (a.e.t.)	Grimsby Town (5)	608
3	Stockport County (6)	2–2	Wrexham (5)	2,416
replay	Wrexham (5)	6–1	Stockport County (6)	1,373
4	FC Halifax Town (5)	5–3	Alfreton Town (5)	949
5	North Ferriby United (6)	2–0	Hyde (6)	265
6	A.F.C. Fylde (6)	4–0	AFC Telford United (5)	307
7	Kidderminster Harriers (5)	0–1	Altrincham (5)	1,204
8	Wealdstone (6)	1–3	Bath City (6)	553

Tie	Home team (tier)	Score	Away team (tier)	Att.
9	Ebbsfleet United (6)	1–0	Forest Green Rovers (5)	1,018
10	Havant & Waterlooville (6)	0–1	Dover Athletic (5)	405
11	Maidenhead United (6)	2–2	Farnborough (6)	303
replay	Farnborough (6)	1–0	Maidenhead United (6)	178
12	Gosport Borough (6)	0–2	Braintree Town (5)	460
13	Oxford City (6)	2–2	Woking (5)	652
replay	Woking (5)	2–1	Oxford City (6)	555
14	Hemel Hempstead Town (6)	3–1	Concord Rangers (6)	529
15	Torquay United (5)	4–0	Bromley (6)	1,507
16	Burgess Hill Town (8)	1–2	Dartford (5)	1,010

== Third round proper ==
A total of 16 clubs took part in this stage of the competition, all winners from the second round. The matches were played on 24 January 2015.

Tie	Home team (tier)	Score	Away team (tier)	Att.
1	Wrexham (5)	1–1	Gateshead (5)	1,474
replay	Gateshead (5)	2–2 (3–5 p)	Wrexham (5)	952
2	Braintree Town (5)	1–1	Ebbsfleet United (6)	406
replay	Ebbsfleet United (6)	2–0	Braintree Town (5)	813
3	F.C. United of Manchester (7)	3–1	A.F.C. Fylde (6)	1,732
4	Dartford (5)	2–2	FC Halifax Town (5)	835
replay	FC Halifax Town (5)	3–1	Dartford (5)	451

Tie	Home team (tier)	Score	Away team (tier)	Att.
5	Farnborough (6)	0–2	North Ferriby United (6)	391
6	Hemel Hempstead Town (6)	0–2	Torquay United (5)	1,116
7	Bath City (6)	1–0	Altrincham (5)	863
8	Woking (5)	3–3	Dover Athletic (5)	1,167
replay	Dover Athletic (5)	1–0	Woking (5)	586

== Fourth round proper ==
A total of eight clubs took part in this stage of the competition, all winners from the third round. The matches were played on 7 February 2015.

Tie	Home team (tier)	Score	Away team (tier)	Att.
1	Dover Athletic (5)	3–3	Bath City (6)	985
replay	Bath City (6)	2–1	Dover Athletic (5)	893
2	FC Halifax Town (5)	0–1	Wrexham (5)	1,126

Tie	Home team (tier)	Score	Away team (tier)	Att.
3	Torquay United (5)	1–0	F.C. United of Manchester (7)	3,805
4	North Ferriby United (6)	1–0	Ebbsfleet United (6)	610

== Semi-finals ==
=== First leg ===
21 February 2015
15:00

Bath City (6)	2–2	North Ferriby United (6)
Pratt (pen.); McCootie	Report	Ball (o.g.); St Juste

Twerton Park, Bath
Attendance: 1,730

21 February 2015
15:00

Wrexham (5)	2–1	Torquay United (5)
Clarke; Moult	Report	Bowman

Racecourse Ground, Wrexham
Attendance: 2,866

=== Second leg ===
28 February 2015

North Ferriby United (6)	1–1 (a.e.t.)	Bath City (6)
King (pen.)	Report	McCootie
Penalties
	4–2

Grange Lane, North Ferriby
Attendance: 1,871

28 February 2015

Torquay United (5)	0–3	Wrexham (5)
	Report	Moult; Morris

Plainmoor, Torquay
Attendance: 3,255

== Final ==
29 March 2015
13:30

North Ferriby United (6)	3–3 (a.e.t.)	Wrexham (5)
King 76' (pen.); Kendall 86', 101'	Report	Moult 11', 118'; Harris 59'
Penalties
	5–4

Wembley Stadium, London
Attendance: 15,585
Referee: Michael Oliver
