= Gary Bradshaw =

English footballer

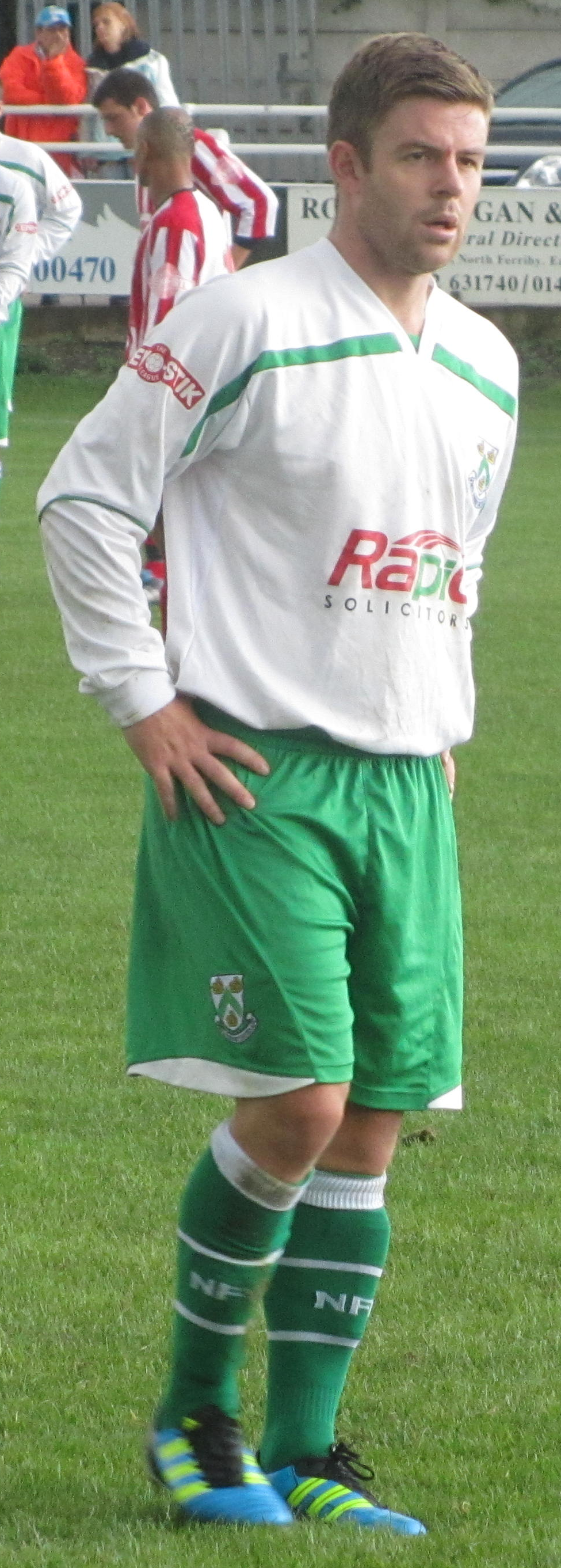
- Bradshaw playing for North Ferriby United in 2011

Personal information
- Full name: Gary Bradshaw
- Date of birth: 30 December 1982 (age 43)
- Place of birth: Beverley, England
- Height: 5 ft 6 in (1.68 m)
- Position: Striker

Youth career
- ?–2000: Hull City

Senior career*
Years	Team	Apps	(Gls)
2000–2003	Hull City	22	(1)
2003	→ Scarborough (loan)	2	(0)
2003	Harrogate Town	15	(4)
2003–2005	North Ferriby United	77	(56)
2005–2006	Cheltenham Town	3	(0)
2006	→ North Ferriby United (loan)	?	(?)
2006–2013	North Ferriby United	?	(?)
2013–2015	Scarborough Athletic	118	(51)
2015–2016	Hull United	14	(10)
2016–2017	AFC Mansfield		
2017–2019	Hall Road Rangers		
2019–2020	North Ferriby		
- * Club domestic league appearances and goals as of 20:57, 8 June 2011 (UTC)

Gary Bradshaw (born 30 December 1982) is an English former professional footballer who played as a striker.

He notably played in the Football League for Hull City and Cheltenham Town, but spent the bulk of his career in non-league football with four spells over ten seasons with North Ferriby United and their eventual phoenix club North Ferriby. He also played for Scarborough, Harrogate Town, Scarborough Athletic, Hull United, AFC Mansfield and Hall Road Rangers.

== Career ==
=== Hull City ===
Born in Beverley, Humberside, Bradshaw started his career with Hull City. He made his debut in a 3–0 defeat against Rotherham United on 7 March 2000 and finished the 1999–2000 season with 11 appearances. He scored his first goal for the side in a 4–1 victory over Mansfield Town on 5 March 2002. Scarborough signed him on loan in February 2003, where he made two appearances in the Conference National. He had his contract with Hull terminated by mutual consent shortly after this loan spell.

=== Non-league ===
He then moved onto Harrogate Town in the Northern Premier League Premier Division, where he made 15 appearances and scored four goals before joining North Ferriby United in the autumn of 2003. He finished the 2003–04 season with 17 goals in 27 appearances, and during his first full season with the club he was captain as they won the Northern Premier League First Division and scored 39 goals in 50 appearances.

=== Cheltenham Town ===
He played for League Two side Cheltenham Town's reserves in August 2005 and eventually signed for the club in September. After being sent off in his debut against Mansfield Town, and making two further appearances for Cheltenham, he rejoined North Ferriby on a month's loan in March 2006.

=== Return to Non-league ===
He resigned for the club in July 2006 and in August became the first player to sign a contract with them in their history. After helping Ferriby to promotion to the Conference North in the 2012–13 season, Bradshaw went on to sign for Scarborough Athletic. In December 2015 he dropped down 2 divisions to sign for Hull United A.F.C.

He later took in spells with AFC Mansfield, Hall Road Rangers and North Ferriby.
