= Steve Housham =

English former professional footballer

Personal information
- Full name: Steven James Housham
- Date of birth: 24 February 1976 (age 50)
- Place of birth: Gainsborough, Lincolnshire, England
- Position: Midfielder

Youth career
- 1990–1993: Scunthorpe United

Senior career*
Years	Team	Apps	(Gls)
1993–2000	Scunthorpe United	115	(4)
2000	→ Barrow (loan)		
2000–2001	Barrow		
2002–2007	Brigg Town		

Managerial career
- 2007–2011: Brigg Town
- 2011–2016: Gainsborough Trinity
- 2016–2017: North Ferriby United
- 2019–2020: Lincoln United
- * Club domestic league appearances and goals

Steven James Housham (born 24 February 1976) is an English football manager and former footballer.

Housham played as a midfielder from 1993 to 2007, notably in the Football League for Scunthorpe United where he was part of the club that triumphed in the 1998/1999 Division Three Play-offs. He moved on to Barrow before finishing his playing career with Brigg Town. He moved into management with Brigg in 2007, before spells with Gainsborough Trinity, North Ferriby United and Lincoln United.

== Career ==
=== Playing career ===
Housham was born in Gainsborough, Lincolnshire. He progressed through Scunthorpe United's youth system and was promoted to the first-team squad in 1993. While at United he was part of the side that earned promotion to the Second Division via the playoffs. The majority of his football at Glanford Park was under the stewardship of Brian Laws. It was Laws who loaned him out initially to Barrow during the 1999–2000 season. He later moved to the club permanently before joining Brigg Town a year later.

=== Managerial career ===
He was appointed Player/Manager of Brigg in 2007, and shortly afterwards retired from playing to tackle his new position in a non-playing capacity. In May 2011 he quit his post at Brigg and took up the role as youth team manager at his hometown club Gainsborough Trinity where he briefly worked under manager Brian Little until he replaced Little as caretaker manager in August 2011. Following five wins out of five in caretaker charge at The Northolme Housham was appointed as full-time manager on 12 September 2011.

In his first season in charge Housham led Trinity to the Conference North play-offs after finishing 4th. They defeated FC Halifax Town over two legs before, despite being favorites, they were beaten 1–0 by Nuneaton Town in the final. During the 2012–13 season Trinity reached the semi-final of the FA Trophy having defeated Barrow in the quarter finals. The Blues were drawn against Conference Premier promotion contenders Wrexham and despite drawing level they were beaten 3–1 away in the first leg. The following week Trinity came from behind to win 2–1 in the second leg, but despite applying a lot of pressure in the final stages they were unable to get a third goal to take the tie into extra time. Wrexham went on to play Grimsby Town in the final, with Trinity missing out on their first ever chance to play at Wembley Stadium. Housham left Gainsborough by mutual consent on 10 March 2016.

On 6 June 2016, Housham was appointed manager of newly promoted National League club North Ferriby United. He was sacked on 24 November 2017, after a run of poor performances and results that left North Ferriby at the bottom of the Conference North shortly after Jamie Waltham took over as the club's owner. He was appointed Lincoln United manager in 2019 with Nathan Jarman as his assistant. The two left the club in March 2020.

== Managerial statistics ==
As of 24 November 2017

Managerial record by team and tenure
Team	From	To	Record					Ref
Team	From	To	P	W	D	L	Win %	Ref
Gainsborough Trinity	22 August 2011	10 March 2016	229	95	40	94	41.5	
North Ferriby United	6 June 2016	24 November 2017	68	13	7	48	19.1	
Total			297	108	47	142	36.4	—

== Honours ==
Scunthorpe United

- Football League Third Division play-offs: 1999
