= Liam King (footballer) =

English footballer who plays in central midfield

Personal information
- Date of birth: 31 December 1987 (age 38)
- Place of birth: Rainworth, England
- Position: Midfielder

Team information
- Current team: Gainsborough Trinity (coach)

Senior career*
Years	Team	Apps	(Gls)
2005–2009	Rotherham United	7	(0)
2008	→ Altrincham (loan)	16	(0)
2009–2013	Matlock Town	198	(28)
2013–2016	North Ferriby United	205	(62)
2016–2017	FC Halifax Town	30	(7)
2017–2019	Gainsborough Trinity	1	(0)

Managerial career
- 2019: Gainsborough Trinity
- * Club domestic league appearances and goals

Liam King (born 31 December 1987) is an English football coach and former player who played in central midfield. He is a coach at Gainsborough Trinity.

== Career ==
On 1 January 2008 King joined Altrincham on a month-long loan, making his first team debut the same day in a 2–1 victory against Northwich Victoria. After several appearances, the loan was extended until April.

He was released by Rotherham United after the 2008–09 season, and subsequently signed for Matlock Town of the Northern Premier League Premier Division.

In 2013 he moved on to North Ferriby and built a strong working relationship with manager Billy Heath who ended up making King captain of the team. In his three years at Ferriby, King and his teammates achieved high success by winning the FA Trophy in 2015 at Wembley Stadium and also won the Conference North in the 2015/16 season. In his time at North Ferriby King made 205 appearances and scored 62 goals.

After going up with North Ferriby, he followed in the footsteps of his manager, Billy Heath, and joined FC Halifax town along with seven other teammates. King was also made captain again by Heath at Halifax.

In November 2017 it was announced that King had left Halifax and joined Gainsborough Trinity for an undisclosed fee. On 11 February 2019, he had his contract cancelled by mutual consent, following injury problems. Just three days later, he was appointed as the caretaker manager of the club following manager Lee Sinnott's departure. After three wins from his first three Northern Premier League games, he was placed in charge until the end of the season alongside Ross Hannah. Their appointment was made permanent at the end of the season. In October 2019 Curtis Woodhouse was appointed manager, with King remaining at the club as a coach.
