= Hall Road Rangers F.C. =

Association football club in England

Coordinates: 53.7812°N 0.3281°W

Hall Road Rangers
- Full name: Hall Road Rangers Football Club
- Nickname: Rangers
- Founded: 1959
- Ground: St Mary Queen of Martyrs, Kingston upon Hull; Dene Park, Kingston upon Hull
- Chairman: Paul Gibbin
- 2022–23: Humber Premier League Premier Division, 4th of 14
Home colours	Away colours

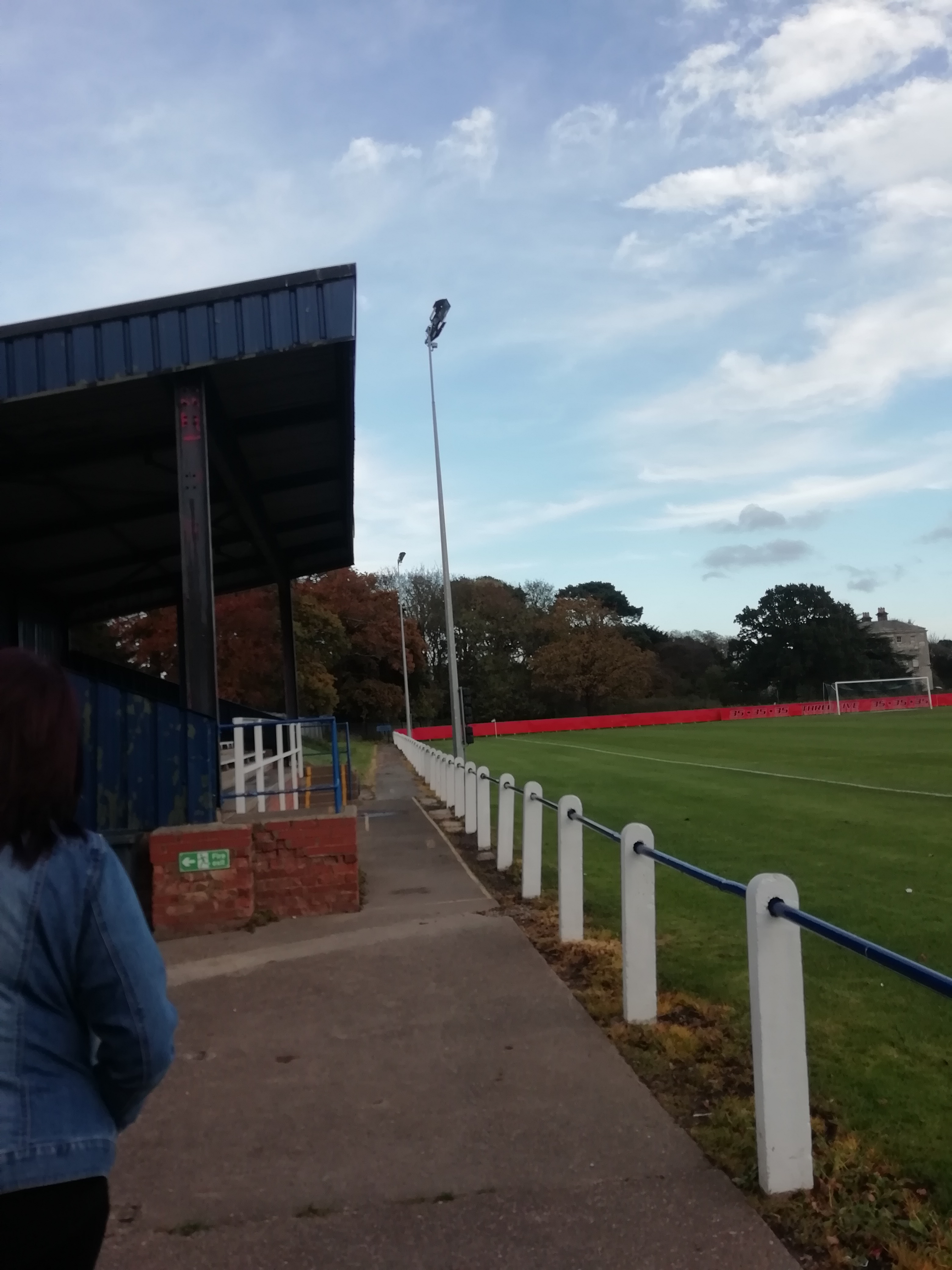
The seated stand at Haworth Park

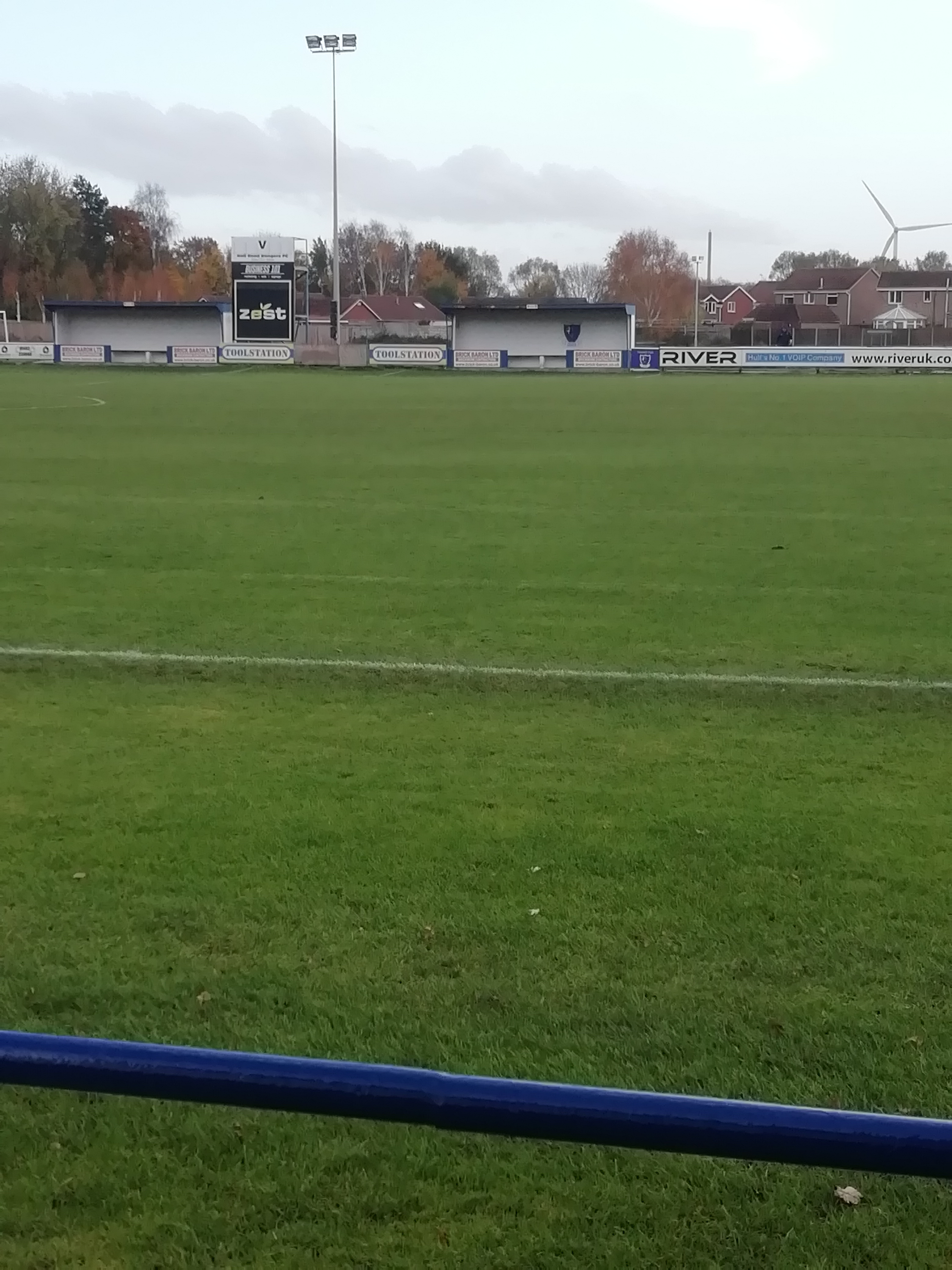
The dugouts at Haworth Park

Hall Road Rangers Football Club is a football club based in Kingston upon Hull, East Riding of Yorkshire, England.

== History ==
The club was formed in 1959 as a Sunday league team by Ted Richardson. They later switched to Saturday football, joining the East Riding County League, before moving up to Division Two of the Yorkshire League in 1968. League reorganisation saw the club demoted to the new Division Three in 1970. They went on to win the division in 1972–73, earning promotion back to Division Two; the season also saw them win the East Riding Senior Cup for the first time. They were relegated to Division Three at the end of the 1975–76 season, but won the division again in 1979–80 and were promoted back to Division Two.

In 1982 the Yorkshire League merged with the Midland League to form the Northern Counties East League. Hall Road Rangers were placed in Division One North, but finished bottom of the division in the league's first season, resulting in relegation to Division Two North. League restructuring saw them placed in Division One North for the 1984–85 season, and the following season they were placed in the new Division Three. However, Division Three was dissolved after a single season and the club moved into Division Two. In 1990–91 they won the Division Two title and were promoted to Division One. The 1993–94 season saw the club win the East Riding Senior Cup for the second time.

In 2003–04 Hall Road Rangers won the league's Wilkinson Sword Trophy, beating Garforth Town 5–4 on aggregate in the final. In 2007–08 they were Division One runners-up, earning promotion to the Premier Division, and also won the Wilkinson Sword Trophy for a second time with a 3–2 aggregate win over Teversal in the final. However, after finishing bottom of the Premier Division in 2012–13 they were relegated back to Division One. In 2016–17 they won the Division One title and were promoted to the Premier Division. The club finished bottom of the Premier Division in 2018–19 and were relegated back to Division One. At the end of the 2021–22 season they resigned from the Northern Counties East League and dropped into the Premier Division of the Humber Premier League. They withdrew from the Humber Premier League a year later and discontinued their men's adult team.

== Ground ==
The club played at Dene Park in Dunswell until losing their tenancy in 2014, after which they moved to Haworth Park in the Bransholme area of Hull, a former home ground of Hull RUFC. The ground had a capacity of 1,200, with a 250-seat stand and 750 covered. After moving to Haworth Park, the club installed floodlights and built new changing rooms.

After dissolving their men's adult team at the end of the 2022–23 season, the club relocated to the St Mary Queen of Martyrs school. At the start of the 2024–25 season the club also moved back to Dene Park as well as St Mary Queen of Martyrs.

== Honours ==
- Northern Counties East League
  - Division One champions 1990–91, 2016–17
  - League Trophy winners 2003–04, 2007–08
- Yorkshire League
  - Division Three champions 1972–73, 1979–80
- East Riding Senior Cup
  - Winners 1972–73, 1993–94, 1994–95

== Records ==
- Best FA Cup performance: First qualifying round, 2007–08
- Best FA Vase performance: Third round, 1999–2000
- Record attendance: 1,200 vs Manchester City, friendly match, August 1993
- Most appearances: G. James
- Most goals: G. James

== See also ==
- Hall Road Rangers F.C. players
