= North Ferriby United A.F.C. =

Association football club in England

- Full name: North Ferriby United Association Football Club
- Nickname: The Villagers
- Founded: 1934; 92 years ago
- Dissolved: 2019; 7 years ago
- Ground: Grange Lane
- Capacity: 2,700
Home colours	Away colours

North Ferriby United Association Football Club was a semi-professional football club in North Ferriby, East Riding of Yorkshire, England. At the time of their demise they were members of the Northern Premier League and played at Grange Lane.

Formed in 1934, North Ferriby reached the Northern Premier League in 2000, and were promoted to the league's Premier Division after winning Division One in the 2004–05 season. The club then won the Premier Division in 2012–13, thus earning promotion to the Conference North. In 2015, they beat Wrexham of the Conference Premier to win the 2014–15 FA Trophy. They were then promoted to the renamed National League after beating AFC Fylde in the 2015–16 National League North play-off final. However, two relegations in as many seasons saw them drop back into the Northern Premier League in 2018. The club was liquidated following a court order on 15 March 2019. On 20 April 2019 it was announced that a phoenix club had been formed, to be known as North Ferriby Football Club, and approval had been granted for them to participate in the Northern Counties East Football League commencing in the 2019–20 season.

== History ==
North Ferriby United formed in 1934 as a result of a meeting at which it was decided to form a local football team. They first took part in the local East Riding Church League and, in 1938, they won the Division One title.

The club re-formed after the Second World War and was admitted to the East Riding Amateur League. The immediate post war years proved to be very successful with the highlight being an appearance in the final qualifying round of the FA Amateur Cup during the 1949–50 season.

In 1969, North Ferriby improved their status when they joined Division Two of the Yorkshire League: the following season they captured the championship and also lifted the East Riding Senior Cup. The year 1975 saw them win the Yorkshire League Cup by defeating Lincoln United 2–0. Twelve months later they finished second to Emley in Division One.

The 1970s were a very positive period for the club and saw them win the East Riding Senior Cup three times. They reached the FA Cup third qualifying round in 1980–81, where they lost away to Boston United.

In 1982 they joined the newly formed Northern Counties East Football League, finishing as runners-up in Division One North. Promotion to the Premier Division was offered to them but had to be declined because the ground facilities were not up to the required standard.

The 1985–86 season saw them take the Division One title and this time they were promoted. They also reached the fourth round of the FA Vase and the following year went out in the fifth round to Farsley Celtic after losing 2–1.

Three seasons later national recognition came their way when they advanced to the semi-final of the FA Vase, losing to Tamworth, after just shading the first leg at Tamworth 2–1.

In 1991, North Ferriby won the inaugural President's Cup, defeating FA Vase champions Guiseley 8–5 on aggregate. They also lifted the East Riding Senior Cup for the first time in 12 years and in the League Cup Final they lost 1–0 to Guiseley. The 1996–97 season saw them appear in the FA Vase Final at Wembley Stadium. A 3–1 aggregate victory over Guisborough Town in the semi-final saw them through to the Final at Wembley Stadium on 10 May 1997, where they were defeated 3–0 by Whitby Town.

=== Northern Premier League ===
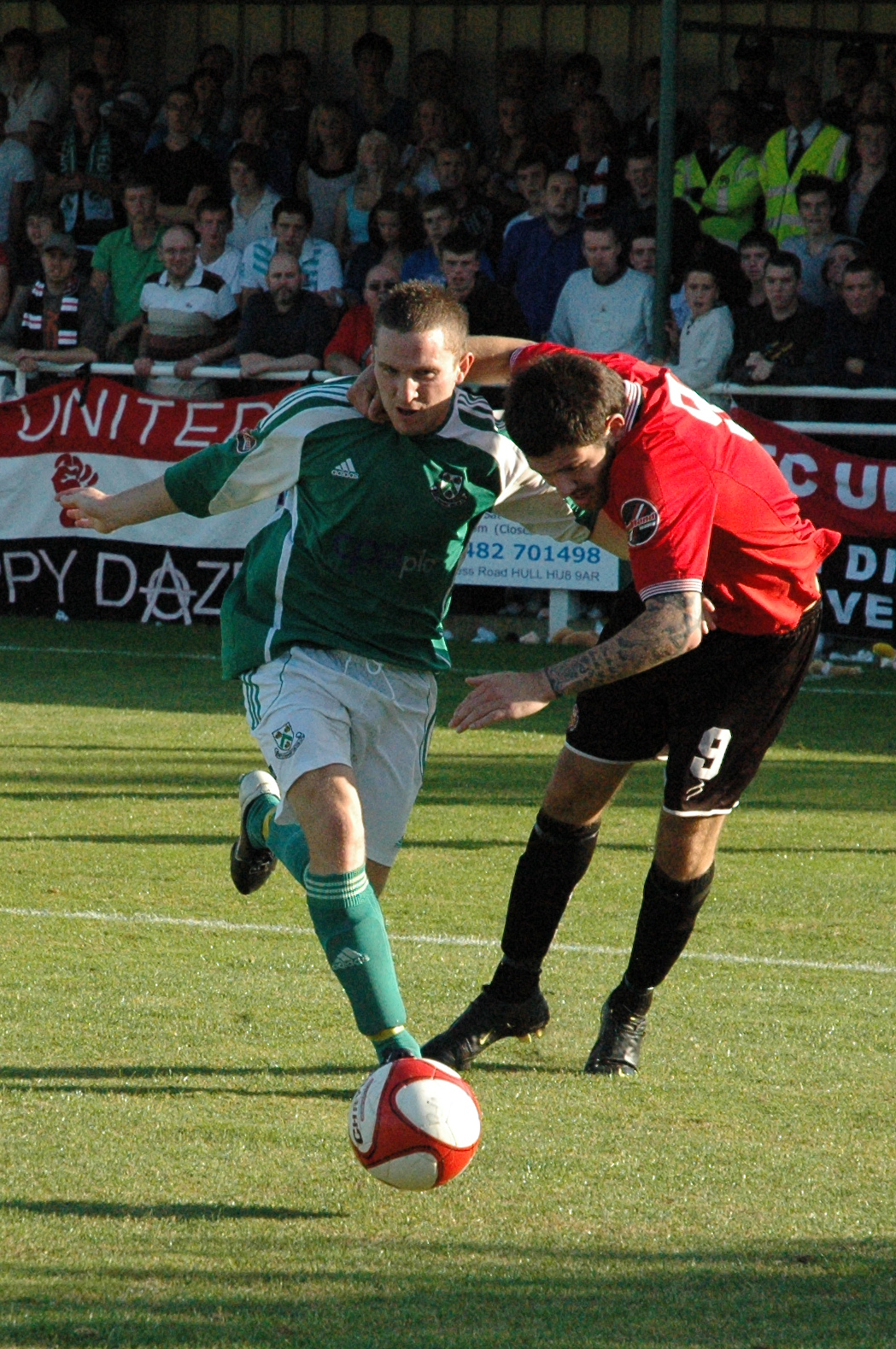
Russell Fry playing for North Ferriby United against F.C. United of Manchester in the 2009–10 FA Cup

The next two seasons saw them miss promotion to the Northern Premier League but in 1999–2000 they won the Northern Counties East Football League championship and, with all the necessary work having been carried out to the ground, they finally achieved their longtime goal of promotion to the higher level of non-League football.

The first season saw the club set a new post-war record by lifting the East Riding Senior Cup for a fifth successive season. The 2001–02 season was the club's second season in the Northern Premier League and the club's progression continued with a higher league placing. The campaign finished on another high as the club retained the East Riding Senior Cup for a sixth year in succession, thus equalling the all-time record held by Hull City in a period which straddled the Second World War. The following season the club gained a place in the play-offs via fourth place in the table. Although the promotion push floundered on a tense evening at Radcliffe Borough, that disappointment was assuaged by the club taking the outright record from Hull with a seventh successive East Riding Senior Cup triumph.

The 70th Anniversary season, 2004–05, proved to be one of the most rewarding in the club's history as the young team clinched the First Division championship on the final day of the season at Mossley. The team led the division from early October and, despite a minor slump in March, never relinquished their grip on top spot. The following season saw the club at the highest level in their history as they entered the Premier Division and led the table from the off until March. Despite missing out on automatic promotion, the club secured a place in the play-offs after a fifth-place finish in the table. They defeated third placed Frickley Athletic away from home on penalties before losing in the Final at Farsley Celtic after extra time.

On 4 May 2013 North Ferriby were crowned as Northern Premier League Premier Division champions after beating Ashton United 2–0 on the final day of the season. They were promoted into the National League North for 2013–14.

=== National League and F.A.Trophy - Success and Relegation ===
In their first ever National League North season, North Ferriby finished second, narrowly missing out on promotion. During 2014–15, the club won the FA Trophy Final at Wembley Stadium, defeating Wrexham 5–4 on penalties after a 3–3 draw. Goalkeeper Adam Nicklin saved three penalties during the shoot-out. North Ferriby United were losing 2–0 in normal time, only to score twice in the last 15 minutes to force extra time. Substitute Ryan Kendall scored his second goal of the match during extra time to put North Ferriby in the lead for the first time during the final, however Louis Moult equalised for Wrexham to take the match to penalties leading to Nicklin's shootout heroics, winning the 2014–15 FA Trophy for Billy Heath's Villagers.

North Ferriby earned promotion into the National League on 14 May 2016, beating AFC Fylde 2–1 after extra time at Grange Lane in the National League North play-off final.

On 24 May 2016 Billy Heath left the club to join FC Halifax Town. Heath proceeded to raid his former Ferriby squad and recruited several first team players, most notably captain Liam King.

On 6 June 2016 The Villagers appointed Steve Housham as Manager, Housham was tasked with keeping The Villagers in the National League.

On 12 June 2016 Housham added Darryn Stamp to his backroom team as assistant manager, having played under Housham at previous club Gainsborough Trinity.

North Ferriby failed to make a push for League football and spent much of the 2016–17 season near the bottom of the National League and were eventually relegated having spent just a year in the 5th tier.

On 22 November 2017 the ownership of the club was transferred from the Foster family to Jamie Waltham. The following day the incoming owner sacked Manager Steve Housham and assistant manager Darryn Stamp due to the previous relegation from the National League and the subsequent run of poor results that left The Villagers rock bottom of the National League North. Housham was replaced as Manager by former captain Chris Bolder.

On 21 March 2018 a second relegation in two seasons was confirmed after a 1–1 draw at home to visiting league leaders Salford City F.C., as Bolder failed to save The Villagers from dropping out of the National League North.

=== Liquidation ===
The club started the 2018–19 season playing in the Northern Premier League following their relegation the previous season.

In the 33 games played up until the winding-up order, the Villagers managed just two wins and four draws, accumulating 10 points and putting them at the foot of the table, 19 points behind second-bottom Workington.

North Ferriby's remaining fixtures were cancelled and the club was not permitted to finish the season.

The club was wound up on 15 March 2019 due to outstanding debts of £7,645.25.

== Records ==
- Best FA Cup performance: Fourth qualifying round, 1997–98, 2013–14, 2014–15, 2015–16 (replay)
- Best FA Trophy performance: Champions, 2014–15
- Best FA Vase performance: Runners-up, 1996–97

== Honours ==
=== League ===
- National League North
  - Play-off winners: 2015–16
- Northern Premier League Premier Division
  - Winners: 2012–13
  - Play-off finalists: 2005–06
  - Play-off semi-finalists: 2009–10, 2010–11
- Northern Premier League Division One
  - Winners: 2004–05
  - Play-off semi-finalists: 2002–03
- Northern Counties East Football League Premier Division
  - Winners: 1999–2000
  - Runners-up: 1997–98
  - Third-placed: 1986–87, 1992–93, 1995–96
- Northern Counties East Football League Division One
  - Winners: 1985–86
- Northern Counties East Football League Division One (North)
  - Runners-up: 1982–83
- Yorkshire Football League Division One
  - Runners-up: 1975–76
  - Third-placed: 1978–79, 1980–81
- Yorkshire Football League Division Two
  - Winners: 1970–71
  - Third-placed: 1969–70, 1973–74

=== Cup ===
- FA Trophy
  - Winners: 2014–15
- FA Vase
  - Runners-up: 1996–97
- Northern Premier League Challenge Cup
  - Winners: 2011–12, 2012–13
- Northern Counties East Football League Presidents Cup
  - Winners: 1990–91, 1998–99, 1999–2000
- East Riding Senior Cup
  - Winners: 1970–71, 1976–77, 1977–78, 1978–79, 1990–91, 1996–97, 1997–98, 1998–99, 1999–2000, 2000–01, 2001–02, 2002–03, 2006–07, 2007–08, 2008–09, 2009–10, 2010–11, 2012–13, 2013–14
