= 2012–13 Northern Counties East Football League =

The 2012–13 Northern Counties East Football League season was the 31st in the history of Northern Counties East Football League, a football competition in England.

== Premier Division ==
Northern Counties East Football League Premier Division
- Season: 2012–13
- Champions: Scarborough Athletic
- Promoted: Scarborough Athletic
- Relegated: Hall Road Rangers
- Matches: 462
- Goals: 1,717 (3.72 per match)
- Biggest home win: Bridlington Town 11–0 Nostell Miners Welfare
- Biggest away win: Lincoln Moorlands Railway 0–10 Scarborough Athletic

The Premier Division featured 19 clubs which competed in the previous season, along with three new clubs:

- Glasshoughton Welfare, promoted from Division One
- Heanor Town, promoted from the East Midlands Counties League
- Worksop Parramore, promoted from Division One
- From this league, seven teams - Bridlington Town, Brighouse Town, Long Eaton United, Scarborough Athletic, Staveley Miners Welfare, Tadcaster Albion and Worksop Parramore - applied for promotion.

=== League table ===
Pos	Team	Pld	W	D	L	GF	GA	GD	Pts	Promotion or relegation
1	Scarborough Athletic	42	30	9	3	129	49	+80	99	Promoted to the Northern Premier League Division One South
2	Brighouse Town	42	30	7	5	106	46	+60	97	
3	Bridlington Town	42	30	5	7	137	54	+83	95	
4	Retford United	42	24	6	12	78	52	+26	78	
5	Pickering Town	42	24	5	13	89	49	+40	77	
6	Tadcaster Albion	42	23	8	11	84	60	+24	77	
7	Worksop Parramore	42	21	9	12	98	78	+20	72	
8	Barton Town Old Boys	42	19	12	11	81	68	+13	69	
9	Parkgate	42	20	6	16	87	67	+20	66	
10	Thackley	42	17	11	14	77	66	+11	62	
11	Heanor Town	42	18	4	20	84	84	0	58	
12	Long Eaton United	42	16	9	17	80	84	−4	57	
13	Staveley Miners Welfare	42	15	9	18	71	84	−13	54	
14	Maltby Main	42	14	6	22	60	73	−13	48	
15	Liversedge	42	11	12	19	68	81	−13	45	
16	Glasshoughton Welfare	42	12	10	20	62	84	−22	45 (Note: Glasshoughton Welfare were deducted 1 point for fielding an ineligible player.)	
17	Nostell Miners Welfare	42	10	8	24	51	102	−51	38	
18	Winterton Rangers	42	9	7	26	48	82	−34	34	
19	Arnold Town	42	14	3	25	65	93	−28	32 (Note: Arnold Town were deducted 3 points for fielding an ineligible player. On 7 March 2013 Arnold Town were deducted a further 10 points under League Rule 14.A.2.1 Sporting Sanctions made active by an Insolvency event. At the end of the season they were demoted to the East Midlands Counties Football League)	Demoted to the East Midlands Counties League
20	Armthorpe Welfare	42	8	8	26	68	111	−43	32	
21	Lincoln Moorlands Railway	42	7	7	28	42	136	−94	28	
22	Hall Road Rangers	42	7	5	30	52	114	−62	26	Relegated to Division One

Source: fchd
Rules for classification: 1) points; 2) goal difference; 3) number of goals scored.

=== Results ===
Home \ Away	ARM	ARN	BAR	BRI	BRT	GLW	HRR	HEA	LIN	LIV	LOE	MAL	NMW	PAR	PIC	RET	SCA	SMW	TAD	THA	WIR	WOP
Armthorpe Welfare		4–0	2–3	0–3	2–5	2–1	0–4	1–7	3–3	2–1	1–2	1–2	1–1	0–2	2–2	3–2	2–3	3–3	3–3	0–2	0–0	0–3
Arnold Town	2–1		3–0	1–4	1–2	3–2	0–1	1–3	2–1	0–1	1–0	3–3	2–1	3–2	0–4	1–0	1–2	3–6	1–2	1–1	2–1	3–2
Barton Town Old Boys	6–1	2–1		3–2	3–3	3–1	3–1	2–0	1–2	1–1	2–2	2–0	3–0	1–1	1–0	2–2	1–1	2–2	1–4	2–2	3–0	1–2
Bridlington Town	3–2	5–2	3–1		2–1	1–1	4–1	4–3	9–2	1–0	2–0	1–0	11–0	4–1	4–1	4–2	3–3	3–2	1–2	4–1	5–1	3–4
Brighouse Town	3–1	2–1	3–1	2–1		2–1	3–1	3–0	8–1	2–0	3–0	2–1	3–0	2–1	1–0	1–2	0–2	1–0	5–1	2–2	3–0	2–2
Glasshoughton Welfare	3–2	2–2	0–3	0–1	1–1		4–2	4–1	0–3	2–2	2–1	1–1	2–0	2–1	0–2	2–2	2–1	0–3	2–3	2–2	0–0	1–2
Hall Road Rangers	4–2	1–3	1–4	0–7	1–3	1–1		0–2	6–0	2–3	4–3	2–3	0–3	3–2	0–4	1–2	1–2	0–2	0–3	1–4	0–0	4–4
Heanor Town	3–2	1–2	0–1	3–5	2–3	3–0	3–0		4–1	3–0	2–4	3–2	3–2	3–2	0–3	0–2	0–3	1–2	4–1	0–5	1–2	0–2
Lincoln Moorlands Railway	1–2	2–1	2–5	0–5	1–3	0–5	1–1	0–2		0–2	0–2	5–2	0–3	0–4	1–1	0–3	0–10	0–2	0–2	0–6	3–1	0–1
Liversedge	1–3	3–1	1–2	1–1	0–4	2–2	1–1	4–4	0–1		1–2	3–2	3–0	1–1	0–2	1–1	2–2	8–1	1–2	0–1	2–4	1–2
Long Eaton United	3–3	4–2	1–1	1–1	0–4	6–1	2–0	2–3	3–3	2–2		2–2	3–0	1–2	2–1	0–1	2–0	3–1	0–3	2–2	2–0	2–0
Maltby Main	2–1	2–0	0–1	1–1	1–2	1–2	2–1	2–1	3–0	4–1	0–4		3–0	3–1	0–1	0–2	2–2	3–1	2–3	2–0	1–0	1–2
Nostell Miners Welfare	1–2	3–2	1–1	1–5	1–1	2–0	2–1	0–0	2–2	2–3	2–3	0–2		0–3	1–1	1–1	3–4	3–0	2–1	1–3	3–1	2–1
Parkgate	2–1	3–2	1–3	1–3	5–2	2–4	2–0	3–2	2–1	4–2	3–1	4–0	6–1		2–0	0–2	2–4	2–3	4–2	0–2	3–0	1–5
Pickering Town	6–2	3–1	3–1	3–1	1–1	3–0	4–1	2–2	7–2	3–0	2–4	2–0	5–0	0–4		2–3	3–2	2–1	3–1	2–1	2–0	3–0
Retford United	3–2	2–1	1–2	0–2	1–0	2–1	4–0	3–0	1–1	1–3	3–1	3–1	2–1	1–2	1–0		2–3	2–0	4–1	2–1	3–1	1–2
Scarborough Athletic	2–2	3–1	2–1	2–1	3–3	3–1	7–0	4–0	5–0	3–3	7–1	4–0	5–0	1–0	2–1	2–0		2–1	2–0	4–1	3–0	6–0
Staveley Miners Welfare	5–4	1–0	3–0	1–5	0–2	0–2	3–0	1–1	2–2	1–2	1–1	3–1	4–0	0–4	2–1	2–2	1–2		2–2	1–4	3–0	2–1
Tadcaster Albion	1–0	4–1	5–1	1–0	3–4	3–1	6–1	0–2	0–1	2–2	5–2	1–0	2–0	0–0	0–2	1–0	1–1	4–0		1–1	2–0	2–1
Thackley	3–0	1–2	2–2	2–5	0–3	2–1	0–2	1–2	3–0	3–2	4–0	2–1	3–1	1–1	1–0	0–1	1–5	1–1	1–1		1–0	3–5
Winterton Rangers	1–3	1–2	4–1	1–4	0–3	1–3	2–0	1–6	7–0	0–1	3–1	2–1	3–4	0–0	2–0	1–4	0–1	3–0	1–1	1–1		1–2
Worksop Parramore	4–0	5–4	2–2	0–3	0–3	7–0	4–2	2–4	5–0	4–1	4–3	1–1	1–1	1–1	0–2	3–2	4–4	2–2	1–2	3–0	2–2	

Source: League Official
Legend: Blue = home team win; Yellow = draw; Red = away team win.

=== Locations ===
Location of the clubs in the 2012-13
NCEL Premier Division

== Division One ==
Northern Counties East Football League Division One
- Season: 2012–13
- Champions: Albion Sports
- Promoted: Albion Sports; Athersley Recreation
- Relegated: Askern Villa
- Matches: 462
- Goals: 1,740 (3.77 per match)
- Biggest home win: Louth Town 11–0 Askern Villa
- Biggest away win: Appleby Frodingham 0–8 Dinnington Town
- Highest scoring: Askern Villa 2–10 Pontefract Collieries

Division One featured 17 clubs which competed in the previous season, along with five new clubs:

- Athersley Recreation, promoted from the Sheffield and Hallamshire County Senior League
- Cleethorpes Town, promoted from the Lincolnshire League
- Clipstone Welfare, promoted from the Central Midlands League
- Knaresborough Town, promoted from the West Yorkshire League
- Selby Town, relegated from the Premier Division

=== League table ===
Pos	Team	Pld	W	D	L	GF	GA	GD	Pts	Promotion or relegation
1	Albion Sports	42	28	8	6	121	42	+79	92	Promoted to the Premier Division
2	Athersley Recreation	42	25	10	7	101	52	+49	85	Promoted to the Premier Division
3	Louth Town	42	24	8	10	91	62	+29	80	
4	Cleethorpes Town	42	23	10	9	108	63	+45	79	
5	Pontefract Collieries	42	24	6	12	88	50	+38	78	
6	Shirebrook Town	42	24	5	13	91	64	+27	77	
7	AFC Emley	42	23	6	13	111	56	+55	75	
8	Knaresborough Town	42	22	9	11	81	55	+26	75	
9	Worsbrough Bridge Athletic	42	21	9	12	89	61	+28	72	
10	Teversal	42	19	8	15	95	66	+29	65	
11	Clipstone	42	16	9	17	70	71	−1	57	
12	Hallam	42	15	11	16	76	72	+4	56	
13	Hemsworth Miners Welfare	42	17	5	20	69	81	−12	56	
14	Eccleshill United	42	15	10	17	79	67	+12	55	
15	Bottesford Town	42	14	9	19	77	88	−11	50 (Note: Bottesford Town had 1 point deducted.)	
16	Selby Town	42	14	4	24	66	91	−25	46	
17	Grimsby Borough	42	13	6	23	54	74	−20	45	
18	Rossington Main	42	11	6	25	57	105	−48	39	
19	Dinnington Town	42	10	7	25	58	102	−44	37	
20	Appleby Frodingham	42	9	7	26	56	125	−69	34	
21	Yorkshire Amateur	42	8	5	29	55	120	−65	29	
22	Askern Villa	42	7	2	33	47	173	−126	23	Relegated to the Central Midlands League

Source: fchd
Rules for classification: 1) points; 2) goal difference; 3) number of goals scored.

=== Results ===
Home \ Away	AFE	ALB	APF	ASK	ATR	BOT	CLE	CLW	DIN	ECC	GRB	HAL	HMW	KNA	LOU	POC	ROM	SEL	SHI	TEV	WBA	YOA
AFC Emley		1–3	5–1	4–0	1–2	8–0	2–3	2–1	3–0	1–1	1–2	2–1	1–2	1–2	2–2	3–1	7–1	7–0	1–2	2–2	2–1	6–0
Albion Sports	4–1		5–1	9–1	1–1	1–0	4–0	1–3	6–0	2–1	1–0	5–2	5–2	2–0	1–1	1–0	1–1	3–0	3–0	2–0	5–2	4–0
Appleby Frodingham	1–1	0–5		0–0	3–2	1–3	0–6	0–2	0–8	3–2	1–4	1–3	3–3	3–1	0–1	0–6	1–2	1–3	0–2	1–5	1–3	3–0
Askern Villa	2–5	0–4	2–4		3–1	2–3	0–6	3–7	0–1	1–5	0–2	1–7	0–4	1–4	3–1	2–10	1–3	0–4	3–1	3–5	2–0	1–2
Athersley Recreation	1–0	4–4	4–1	8–1		7–1	3–3	0–0	7–1	1–3	3–0	1–1	2–1	1–0	2–0	0–1	2–2	2–1	1–2	2–1	3–0	7–1
Bottesford Town	2–3	0–5	4–4	7–0	2–4		1–1	1–2	3–1	1–4	0–1	3–1	0–2	1–1	5–1	1–1	4–1	1–2	1–3	1–3	1–0	1–1
Cleethorpes Town	3–3	1–1	2–1	5–1	4–0	3–2		4–2	0–1	3–2	5–2	6–2	1–0	1–1	6–1	0–3	3–2	2–1	2–3	1–1	1–0	5–0
Clipstone	1–2	0–5	2–2	3–1	1–2	2–2	3–1		1–3	1–1	0–0	3–1	2–1	2–0	2–1	0–1	0–1	2–4	1–2	0–2	3–1	3–2
Dinnington Town	0–5	2–3	1–1	3–1	0–3	1–1	0–6	2–2		3–1	0–2	1–4	3–4	0–2	1–4	2–3	2–2	4–2	1–4	1–6	0–0	1–2
Eccleshill United	1–1	1–0	4–0	5–2	3–2	1–2	1–2	2–3	4–0		2–4	1–1	1–2	1–3	0–1	0–1	6–1	2–5	4–3	4–3	2–0	1–2
Grimsby Borough	1–2	2–3	0–2	4–0	1–1	3–0	0–2	1–1	3–2	0–0		1–0	1–3	0–2	1–2	1–1	3–4	1–2	0–4	1–0	0–2	3–2
Hallam	4–1	1–0	3–4	5–0	1–2	0–5	2–2	2–0	1–1	1–1	3–1		0–1	0–3	1–1	2–0	2–1	0–4	2–2	1–2	0–1	1–1
Hemsworth Miners Welfare	0–1	0–0	2–3	1–5	2–2	3–1	1–1	0–2	2–4	1–0	1–0	1–3		0–4	0–2	1–2	3–4	4–0	4–2	1–3	3–4	3–0
Knaresborough Town	2–1	1–0	3–1	0–1	2–2	3–0	2–2	2–0	1–0	1–1	4–1	1–3	1–1		3–2	1–3	2–1	2–1	1–4	5–2	2–4	3–3
Louth Town	1–2	2–1	3–1	11–0	1–2	3–3	2–1	2–1	2–0	0–0	4–3	2–2	5–1	1–0		4–2	1–0	3–1	0–3	2–0	1–0	5–1
Pontefract Collieries	0–2	1–3	4–0	9–0	0–3	1–2	2–1	2–1	2–0	2–1	0–0	1–2	0–1	1–1	3–1		4–0	2–2	4–1	2–1	1–0	0–1
Rossington Main	0–3	1–2	1–1	1–1	0–2	0–3	1–2	1–4	1–2	1–3	3–1	4–3	1–4	0–3	0–1	3–3		2–0	0–4	0–5	1–3	5–2
Selby Town	0–3	0–5	0–1	2–0	0–2	2–1	1–3	1–1	1–0	1–1	1–2	0–3	1–2	2–3	3–5	2–4	1–0		2–0	2–1	2–3	4–1
Shirebrook Town	3–1	0–4	4–1	5–0	1–3	3–1	3–2	2–2	2–1	1–1	1–0	1–0	2–0	0–1	2–3	1–2	0–1	4–2		2–2	3–2	2–1
Teversal	1–4	2–2	3–1	6–0	0–1	1–3	1–1	4–1	2–0	1–2	1–0	1–1	4–0	0–4	2–2	0–1	5–0	3–2	2–2		4–0	4–2
Worsbrough Bridge Athletic	1–0	2–2	7–2	6–0	1–1	2–2	3–2	3–0	2–2	4–0	5–1	2–2	4–0	2–2	1–1	3–0	3–1	3–0	2–1	3–2		2–1
Yorkshire Amateur	1–8	5–3	4–1	0–3	1–2	0–2	2–3	1–3	1–3	0–3	3–1	1–2	1–2	3–2	0–3	0–2	2–3	2–2	0–4	1–2	2–2	

Source: League Official
Legend: Blue = home team win; Yellow = draw; Red = away team win.
