= 2013–14 Northern Counties East Football League =

The 2013–14 Northern Counties East Football League season was the 32nd in the history of Northern Counties East Football League, a football competition in England.

Hucknall Town were originally due to play in the Premier Division but it was announced on 9 July 2013 that they had decided to withdraw due to financial reasons, instead deciding to join the Central Midlands Football League.

== Premier Division ==
Northern Counties East Football League Premier Division
- Season: 2013–14
- Champions: Brighouse Town
- Promoted: Brighouse Town
- Relegated: Lincoln Moorlands Railway; Winterton Rangers
- Matches: 506
- Goals: 1,988 (3.93 per match)
- Biggest home win: Pickering Town 11–0 Lincoln Moorlands Railway
- Biggest away win: Lincoln Moorlands Railway 0–9 Brighouse Town
- Highest scoring: Nostell Miners Welfare 4–9 Heanor Town (13 goals)

The Premier Division featured 19 clubs which competed in the previous season, along with four new clubs.

- Clubs promoted from Division One:
  - Albion Sports
  - Athersley Recreation
- Plus:
  - Basford United, promoted from the East Midlands Counties League
  - Garforth Town, relegated from the Northern Premier League
- From this league, seven teams - Basford United, Bridlington Town, Brighouse Town, Retford United, Tadcaster Albion, Thackley and Worksop Parramore - applied for promotion.

At the end of the season Worksop Parramore merged with Handsworth at the end of the season to form Handsworth Parramore

=== League table ===
Pos	Team	Pld	W	D	L	GF	GA	GD	Pts	Promotion or relegation
1	Brighouse Town	44	32	5	7	138	50	+88	101	Promoted to the Northern Premier League Division One North
2	Barton Town Old Boys	44	29	6	9	124	52	+72	93	
3	Tadcaster Albion	44	29	10	5	116	48	+68	93 (Note: Tadcaster Albion were deducted 4 points for fielding an ineligible player on two occasions (vs Worksop Parramore and Barton Town))	
4	Worksop Parramore	44	29	5	10	105	53	+52	92	
5	Basford United	44	26	6	12	97	57	+40	84	Transferred to the Midland League
6	Albion Sports	44	25	5	14	109	77	+32	80	
7	Pickering Town	44	25	4	15	126	78	+48	79	
8	Heanor Town	44	24	5	15	113	81	+32	77	
9	Retford United	44	22	10	12	95	52	+43	76	
10	Athersley Recreation	44	23	7	14	103	73	+30	76	
11	Long Eaton United	44	23	3	18	77	64	+13	72	Transferred to the Midland League
12	Bridlington Town	44	21	8	15	100	82	+18	71	
13	Thackley	44	22	4	18	92	83	+9	70	
14	Garforth Town	44	19	7	18	85	70	+15	64	
15	Maltby Main	44	19	3	22	88	87	+1	48 (Note: Maltby Main were deducted 12 points for fielding ineligible players on four occasions (vs Garforth Town, Parkgate, Winterton Rangers and Basford United))	
16	Glasshoughton Welfare	44	14	6	24	59	98	−39	48	
17	Staveley Miners Welfare	44	13	6	25	79	98	−19	44 (Note: Staveley Miners Welfare were deducted 1 point for fielding an ineligible player (vs Athersley Recreation))	
18	Armthorpe Welfare	44	11	7	26	59	97	−38	40	
19	Parkgate	44	10	9	25	57	86	−29	39	
20	Liversedge	44	10	6	28	58	115	−57	36	
21	Nostell Miners Welfare	44	6	4	34	46	134	−88	22	
22	Winterton Rangers	44	5	6	33	35	139	−104	21	Relegated to Division One
23	Lincoln Moorlands Railway	44	2	2	40	27	214	−187	8	Relegated to Division One

Source: fchd
Rules for classification: 1) points; 2) goal difference; 3) number of goals scored.

=== Results ===
Home \ Away	ALB	ARM	ATR	BAR	BAS	BRI	BRT	GAR	GLW	HEA	LIN	LIV	LOE	MAL	NMW	PAR	PIC	RET	SMW	TAD	THA	WIR	WOP
Albion Sports		8–1	5–2	1–1	1–3	3–3	2–5	3–2	1–1	3–2	6–1	3–2	2–3	2–3	4–1	2–0	3–2	0–3	6–2	1–1	1–5	4–0	0–2
Armthorpe Welfare	0–4		1–2	3–2	2–1	0–3	1–5	1–2	1–1	1–3	4–1	1–1	1–2	2–0	2–1	2–3	2–6	0–0	2–0	0–1	2–0	3–1	2–3
Athersley Recreation	1–0	2–0		1–3	0–4	3–3	2–3	0–1	5–2	3–2	8–1	2–2	4–1	4–6	6–2	1–0	1–1	0–2	0–0	0–1	2–4	2–1	1–2
Barton Town Old Boys	2–3	4–0	1–2		1–1	2–1	2–1	2–0	3–2	4–0	5–0	5–0	2–0	2–0	2–0	0–0	4–0	1–0	2–0	2–2	4–0	8–0	2–4
Basford United	2–1	3–1	3–1	0–2		3–1	1–0	2–1	0–1	5–1	7–0	0–0	2–0	0–5	3–2	4–2	1–1	2–2	4–1	5–3	4–1	1–0	1–0
Bridlington Town	0–4	2–0	3–2	2–1	0–7		2–6	3–0	3–2	5–0	10–0	3–3	1–2	2–0	7–2	0–0	0–1	1–2	4–0	0–4	2–1	1–1	0–2
Brighouse Town	3–4	4–1	2–2	1–1	2–1	0–1		4–1	3–1	0–0	4–0	3–0	3–1	2–0	2–0	4–0	3–2	2–0	2–2	8–1	4–2	9–1	5–2
Garforth Town	1–1	0–2	1–2	1–4	1–1	5–2	2–3		1–2	1–3	6–2	2–2	3–2	3–0	2–0	3–2	3–5	2–2	2–0	0–0	1–2	1–0	1–1
Glasshoughton Welfare	1–2	1–0	0–2	0–6	2–3	0–2	1–3	3–3		1–2	3–0	2–0	0–3	3–3	6–1	0–2	1–2	1–6	2–0	0–2	0–3	3–1	0–2
Heanor Town	2–1	3–1	2–2	4–0	0–3	2–1	1–0	2–1	1–3		6–0	5–0	4–3	1–1	4–2	2–0	5–2	1–1	1–2	1–3	4–3	5–0	0–3
Lincoln Moorlands Railway	0–4	0–4	0–4	1–6	0–2	2–4	0–9	0–5	1–1	1–8		0–2	0–2	1–3	1–2	0–4	0–6	0–6	0–8	1–8	1–6	0–2	2–1
Liversedge	4–5	3–2	0–4	3–1	0–1	0–3	1–5	0–4	1–3	1–4	4–3		0–4	1–4	1–1	2–1	1–3	0–3	3–5	0–4	1–2	2–0	1–7
Long Eaton United	3–1	1–0	0–2	1–3	2–3	1–1	0–4	0–2	7–0	1–1	6–0	3–1		1–3	2–1	2–0	2–1	0–1	1–0	0–1	3–2	2–0	0–1
Maltby Main	0–2	6–0	5–1	1–5	3–1	1–3	0–2	1–0	1–2	4–2	6–2	0–3	0–2		3–1	2–1	1–2	0–3	2–1	1–2	1–4	2–1	1–3
Nostell Miners Welfare	1–2	0–0	0–6	1–4	0–6	4–2	0–2	2–0	2–4	4–9	1–0	1–0	0–1	1–5		0–1	0–4	0–5	2–2	0–5	2–0	0–2	2–4
Parkgate	3–1	2–2	1–4	2–6	3–1	3–4	3–0	1–3	0–0	1–5	1–2	0–1	0–0	0–3	2–0		0–4	2–1	3–1	2–2	2–2	2–2	1–3
Pickering Town	0–3	3–0	3–2	2–6	2–2	1–2	1–3	0–2	6–0	3–0	11–0	0–4	0–3	6–1	3–0	2–1		2–1	6–2	0–4	7–2	7–1	3–1
Retford United	5–1	1–1	2–3	5–1	1–0	1–0	2–5	2–1	1–2	0–4	5–0	2–0	0–1	2–0	6–1	1–1	2–1		1–4	1–1	0–1	4–0	0–0
Staveley Miners Welfare	0–2	1–1	0–4	1–3	2–0	3–3	2–4	2–4	1–0	2–5	5–1	8–2	1–2	3–1	2–0	1–0	2–4	3–2		2–4	1–3	4–0	0–3
Tadcaster Albion	0–1	4–1	2–2	2–1	5–0	2–2	1–3	4–1	0–1	2–0	6–0	2–0	4–1	2–0	4–1	4–3	5–0	1–1	1–1		2–0	6–0	1–0
Thackley	1–2	3–2	0–2	2–3	2–1	1–2	1–1	0–1	1–0	2–1	8–1	2–1	5–2	3–2	3–1	4–2	1–1	2–5	1–0	2–2		2–0	0–3
Winterton Rangers	1–3	0–4	0–2	0–3	0–3	2–4	0–3	0–7	3–1	1–5	1–1	1–5	1–4	1–5	1–1	2–0	1–8	1–1	2–1	2–3	1–2		1–1
Worksop Parramore	2–1	4–3	1–2	2–2	2–0	3–2	2–1	0–2	8–0	4–0	4–1	1–0	3–0	2–2	4–3	1–0	0–2	3–4	3–1	1–2	3–1	4–0	

Source: League Official
Legend: Blue = home team win; Yellow = draw; Red = away team win.

=== Locations ===
Location of the clubs in the 2013-14
NCEL Premier Division

== Division One ==
Northern Counties East Football League Division One
- Season: 2013–14
- Champions: Cleethorpes Town
- Promoted: Cleethorpes Town; Shaw Lane Aquaforce
- Relegated: Appleby Frodingham
- Matches: 462
- Goals: 1,761 (3.81 per match)
- Biggest home win: Shaw Lane Aquaforce 13–0 Grimsby Borough
- Biggest away win: Louth Town 3–11 Teversal
- Highest scoring: Louth Town 3–11 Teversal (14 goals)

Division One featured 19 clubs which competed in the previous season, along with three new clubs:

- Dronfield Town, promoted from the Central Midlands League
- Hall Road Rangers, relegated from the Premier Division
- Shaw Lane Aquaforce, promoted from the Sheffield and Hallamshire County Senior Football League

=== League table ===
Pos	Team	Pld	W	D	L	GF	GA	GD	Pts	Promotion or relegation
1	Cleethorpes Town	42	28	7	7	104	50	+54	91	Promoted to the Premier Division
2	Shaw Lane Aquaforce	42	27	6	9	125	45	+80	87	Promoted to the Premier Division
3	Bottesford Town	42	24	12	6	101	43	+58	84	
4	Eccleshill United	42	24	9	9	94	51	+43	81	
5	Shirebrook Town	42	22	10	10	90	46	+44	76	
6	Knaresborough Town	42	23	7	12	92	52	+40	76	
7	Clipstone	42	22	10	10	88	63	+25	76	
8	AFC Emley	42	21	11	10	85	65	+20	74	
9	Pontefract Collieries	42	20	13	9	96	58	+38	73	
10	Worsbrough Bridge Athletic	42	20	13	9	94	62	+32	73	
11	Hall Road Rangers	42	17	7	18	94	89	+5	58	
12	Selby Town	42	19	3	20	77	86	−9	57 (Note: Selby Town were deducted 3 points for fielding an ineligible player (vs Bottesford Town))	
13	Rossington Main	42	18	3	21	65	89	−24	57	
14	Dronfield Town	42	13	12	17	71	85	−14	51	
15	Teversal	42	14	8	20	76	91	−15	50	
16	Grimsby Borough	42	15	4	23	73	98	−25	46 (Note: Grimsby Borough were deducted 3 points for fielding an ineligible player (vs Rossington Main))	
17	Hemsworth Miners Welfare	42	12	9	21	61	79	−18	45	
18	Dinnington Town	42	12	4	26	59	111	−52	40	Resigned to the Central Midlands Football League
19	Yorkshire Amateur	42	11	5	26	59	99	−40	38	
20	Hallam	42	6	11	25	58	99	−41	29	
21	Louth Town	42	6	2	34	49	136	−87	20	
22	Appleby Frodingham	42	3	4	35	50	164	−114	13	Relegated to the Central Midlands Football League

Source: fchd
Rules for classification: 1) points; 2) goal difference; 3) number of goals scored.

=== Results ===
Home \ Away	AFE	APF	BOT	CLE	CLW	DIN	DRO	ECC	GRB	HRR	HAL	HMW	KNA	LOU	POC	ROM	SEL	SAQ	SHI	TEV	WBA	YOA
AFC Emley		4–1	3–3	2–0	2–2	2–4	1–0	2–5	7–2	2–1	4–3	1–0	2–0	2–1	2–2	1–1	0–1	3–2	1–1	2–3	1–1	2–2
Appleby Frodingham	0–4		0–7	1–3	2–2	2–3	1–3	0–2	0–4	1–5	5–6	0–3	0–4	3–1	2–2	0–2	1–5	0–3	2–9	0–1	1–6	0–2
Bottesford Town	4–0	3–2		3–0	0–1	3–2	1–1	1–0	2–0	4–0	3–1	3–1	1–0	6–0	4–1	0–0	0–2	1–2	2–1	2–2	2–0	6–0
Cleethorpes Town	3–1	7–1	0–3		2–1	8–0	5–0	0–2	2–1	6–1	4–1	3–3	1–2	2–0	4–4	0–1	4–2	3–2	2–1	3–0	1–0	9–1
Clipstone	3–4	1–0	0–0	0–2		1–1	2–0	2–4	2–1	2–1	4–0	2–1	1–3	4–1	1–3	3–1	2–0	0–3	2–0	3–3	5–1	1–0
Dinnington Town	0–2	7–3	1–7	0–2	0–1		0–1	1–4	1–2	2–6	0–0	0–0	0–2	4–1	2–3	1–2	0–2	1–0	0–3	1–0	2–2	3–0
Dronfield Town	2–2	2–1	3–3	1–3	1–1	0–3		2–2	4–0	2–1	3–1	1–2	2–2	1–1	1–1	1–2	6–2	1–6	0–1	2–0	2–2	0–3
Eccleshill United	2–2	3–3	3–0	1–2	3–3	2–1	2–0		2–3	2–0	4–4	1–0	1–3	5–0	2–2	2–1	4–0	0–2	1–1	0–2	2–2	3–1
Grimsby Borough	1–2	1–2	3–0	1–1	3–2	2–3	1–3	0–2		1–3	0–2	3–2	2–1	3–2	2–4	5–1	4–2	0–4	1–1	3–0	1–2	1–0
Hall Road Rangers	0–3	2–2	2–2	1–3	3–5	5–2	2–3	0–1	3–1		8–3	5–2	1–1	2–0	3–2	6–1	4–2	1–3	1–4	1–1	3–1	2–3
Hallam	0–2	5–0	2–2	1–1	1–2	0–1	2–2	0–4	1–1	1–2		2–1	0–2	1–2	1–1	3–1	1–3	0–4	0–2	1–1	2–2	2–3
Hemsworth Miners Welfare	1–0	1–2	0–0	0–1	1–1	1–2	2–2	0–4	2–3	2–2	5–2		1–4	2–1	0–4	0–3	1–3	1–3	1–1	2–5	0–1	6–0
Knaresborough Town	2–1	9–1	0–2	2–2	1–4	4–0	4–1	0–0	2–1	4–0	2–1	1–2		3–1	1–3	0–2	3–1	0–1	1–2	4–0	1–2	0–0
Louth Town	0–1	2–0	1–2	1–3	1–3	4–3	1–3	0–4	0–5	0–3	2–1	0–1	2–5		2–7	4–1	3–1	1–3	0–6	3–11	0–4	1–1
Pontefract Collieries	1–3	5–1	1–1	4–0	2–1	5–0	1–1	0–2	3–1	3–0	1–0	0–1	0–1	2–1		6–1	1–1	0–1	3–0	2–0	2–1	3–1
Rossington Main	2–0	2–1	1–2	2–3	2–5	4–0	3–2	1–7	4–1	1–1	3–2	2–0	2–4	2–0	3–2		0–2	0–4	0–2	2–1	2–3	1–0
Selby Town	2–2	4–3	4–3	1–2	0–2	3–2	3–1	0–1	2–1	0–2	4–0	1–3	1–0	4–2	3–3	1–3		3–1	4–2	1–3	1–4	3–1
Shaw Lane Aquaforce	0–2	2–0	1–1	1–1	3–4	9–0	1–3	2–0	13–0	4–2	2–0	3–3	2–2	11–2	1–1	4–1	4–0		2–1	7–2	1–2	2–1
Shirebrook Town	2–1	12–0	0–4	1–2	1–1	2–1	4–1	2–1	1–1	3–0	2–0	4–1	2–2	3–2	0–0	2–0	2–0	1–2		3–1	1–2	2–0
Teversal	1–2	5–2	0–4	0–3	2–1	1–3	4–3	0–1	4–3	1–3	1–1	1–2	1–2	5–3	1–1	2–1	2–0	0–4	0–0		1–1	5–0
Worsbrough Bridge Athletic	1–1	4–0	2–2	0–0	3–3	7–2	1–2	4–0	4–1	0–3	3–3	2–2	2–3	2–0	1–0	4–1	3–2	1–0	1–1	4–1		1–3
Yorkshire Amateur	3–4	6–4	0–2	0–1	1–2	3–0	5–2	2–3	0–3	3–3	0–1	0–2	1–5	1–0	4–5	2–0	0–1	0–0	0–1	5–2	1–5	

Source: League Official
Legend: Blue = home team win; Yellow = draw; Red = away team win.

== League Cup ==
2013–14 Northern Counties East Football League League Cup
Tournament details
- Country: England
- Teams: 45

The 2013–14 Northern Counties East Football League League Cup is the 32nd season of the league cup competition of the Northern Counties East Football League.

=== Calendar ===
Round	Matches played	Matches	Clubs
Preliminary round	17–18 September 2013	6	45 → 39
First round	1 October-6 November 2013	8	39 → 31
Second round	5 November 2013 – 22 January 2014	15	31 → 16
Third round	19 February-12 March 2014	8	16 → 8
Quarterfinals	18–31 March 2014	4	8 → 4
Semifinals	16 and 22 April 2014	2	4 → 2
Final	3 May 2014	1	2 → 1

=== Preliminary round ===
In the preliminary round, 12 teams from the Division One have been drawn together.

Home team	Score	Away team	Attendance
Appleby Frodingham	2-3	Hemsworth Miners Welfare	26
Cleethorpes Town	3-1	Hallam	51
Pontefract Collieries	1-3	Shirebrook Town	79
Rossington Main	4-3	Louth Town	41
Selby Town	2-1	Clipstone	55
Teversal	4-1	Dinnington Town	32

=== First round ===
The six clubs which made it through the preliminary round enter into the draw with the remaining 10 teams from Division One.

Home team	Score	Away team	Attendance
A.F.C. Emley	3-2	Teversal F.C.	83
Hemsworth Miners Welfare	0-0 (aet)	Grimsby Borough	65
Hemsworth Miners Welfare advance 4–2 on penalties.
Bottesford Town	1-2	Hall Road Rangers	34
Dronfield Town	2-1	Shaw Lane Aquaforce	111
Eccleshill United	2-1	Cleethorpes Town	10
Rossington Main	0-6	Knaresborough Town	51
Shirebrook Town	1-2 (aet)	Worsbrough Bridge Athletic	55
Yorkshire Amateur	2-3 (aet)	Selby Town	48

=== Second round ===
The 16 winners from the first round are joined by 22 of the clubs from the Premier Division. Long Eaton United received a bye to the third round after Hucknall Town resigned from the league after the draw had been made.

Home team	Score	Away team	Attendance
A.F.C. Emley	1-2	Retford United	68
Albion Sports	1-3	Eccleshill United	30
Hemsworth Miners Welfare	1-2	Knaresborough Town	53
Armthorpe Welfare	0-2	Thackley	37
Basford United	1-3	Brighouse Town	71
Bridlington Town	2-0	Athersley Recreation	82
Garforth Town	4-2	Hall Road Rangers	58
Glasshoughton Welfare	2-4	Tadcaster Albion	56

Home team	Score	Away team	Attendance
Hucknall Town	W/O	Long Eaton United	
Hucknall Town withdraw from league
Liversedge	3-5	Dronfield Town	32
Lincoln Moorlands Railway	2-5	Winterton Rangers	20
Nostell Miners Welfare	4-0	Staveley Miners Welfare	30
Parkgate	0-8	Heanor Town	63
Pickering Town	1-0 (aet)	Worsbrough Bridge Athletic	74
Worksop Parramore	3-1	Barton Town Old Boys	54
Selby Town	2-2 (aet)	Maltby Main	107
Selby Town advance 4–2 on penalties.

=== Third round ===
Home team	Score	Away team	Attendance
Eccleshill United	2-1	Tadcaster Albion	40
Brighouse Town	2-2 (aet)	Long Eaton United	50
Long Eaton United advance 10–9 on penalties.
Bridlington Town	1-0	Worksop Parramore	67
Garforth Town	0-2	Knaresborough Town	81

Home team	Score	Away team	Attendance
Heanor Town	4-1	Thackley	101
Nostell Miners Welfare	2-1	Selby Town	39
Pickering Town	4-2	Dronfield Town	116
Winterton Rangers	0-4	Retford United	77

=== Fourth round ===
Home team	Score	Away team	Attendance
Pickering Town	1-2	Long Eaton United	129
Retford United	0-2	Heanor Town	94
Nostell Miners Welfare	0-1	Eccleshill United	37
Bridlington Town	0-1	Knaresborough Town	105

=== Semi-finals ===
Home team	Score	Away team	Attendance
Long Eaton United	0-1	Knaresborough Town	91
Heanor Town	3-4	Eccleshill United	164

== League Cup Final ==
Match played at Bradford City's ground.

Home team	Score	Away team	Attendance
Eccleshill United	2-2	Knaresborough Town	390
Knaresborough Town win 4–2 on penalties.
