= 2006–07 Northern Counties East Football League =

The 2006–07 Northern Counties East Football League season was the 25th in the history of Northern Counties East Football League, a football competition in England.

== Premier Division ==
Northern Counties East Football League Premier Division
- Season: 2006–07
- Champions: Retford United
- Promoted: Carlton Town; Garforth Town; Retford United; Sheffield
- Matches: 380
- Goals: 1,269 (3.34 per match)

The Premier Division featured 18 clubs which competed in the previous season, along with two new clubs, promoted from Division One:

- Carlton Town
- Retford United

Also, Brodsworth Miners Welfare changed name to Brodsworth Welfare.

=== League table ===
| Pos | Team | Pld | W | D | L | GF | GA | GD | Pts | Promotion or relegation |
|---|---|---|---|---|---|---|---|---|---|---|
| 1 | Retford United | 38 | 25 | 7 | 6 | 92 | 37 | +55 | 82 | Promoted to the Northern Premier League Division One South |
| 2 | Sheffield | 38 | 23 | 8 | 7 | 71 | 39 | +32 | 77 | Promoted to the Northern Premier League Division One South |
| 3 | Carlton Town | 38 | 23 | 4 | 11 | 83 | 41 | +42 | 73 | Promoted to the Northern Premier League Division One South |
| 4 | Garforth Town | 38 | 21 | 7 | 10 | 83 | 44 | +39 | 70 | Promoted to the Northern Premier League Division One North |
| 5 | Selby Town | 38 | 21 | 6 | 11 | 75 | 49 | +26 | 69 | |
| 6 | Glapwell | 38 | 20 | 6 | 12 | 71 | 48 | +23 | 66 | |
| 7 | Mickleover Sports | 38 | 18 | 9 | 11 | 70 | 62 | +8 | 63 | |
| 8 | Sutton Town | 38 | 16 | 11 | 11 | 60 | 42 | +18 | 56 (Note: Sutton Town were deducted 3 points.) | Club folded |
| 9 | Pickering Town | 38 | 16 | 8 | 14 | 61 | 54 | +7 | 56 | |
| 10 | Maltby Main | 38 | 14 | 10 | 14 | 56 | 58 | −2 | 52 | |
| 11 | Long Eaton United | 38 | 13 | 12 | 13 | 57 | 60 | −3 | 51 | |
| 12 | Liversedge | 38 | 13 | 10 | 15 | 58 | 60 | −2 | 49 | |
| 13 | Armthorpe Welfare | 38 | 15 | 3 | 20 | 62 | 63 | −1 | 48 | |
| 14 | Hallam | 38 | 14 | 6 | 18 | 57 | 63 | −6 | 48 | |
| 15 | Arnold Town | 38 | 12 | 9 | 17 | 66 | 77 | −11 | 45 | |
| 16 | Glasshoughton Welfare | 38 | 12 | 7 | 19 | 58 | 66 | −8 | 43 | |
| 17 | Eccleshill United | 38 | 10 | 9 | 19 | 63 | 105 | −42 | 39 | |
| 18 | Thackley | 38 | 8 | 8 | 22 | 52 | 89 | −37 | 31 (Note: Thackley were deducted 1 point.) | |
| 19 | Shirebrook Town | 38 | 7 | 9 | 22 | 44 | 79 | −35 | 30 | |
| 20 | Brodsworth Welfare | 38 | 2 | 5 | 31 | 30 | 133 | −103 | 10 (Note: Brodsworth Welfare were deducted 1 point.) | |

Source: fchd
Rules for classification: 1) points; 2) goal difference; 3) number of goals scored.

== Division One ==
Northern Counties East Football League Division One
- Season: 2006–07
- Champions: Parkgate
- Promoted: Lincoln Moorlands; Nostell Miners Welfare; Parkgate; South Normanton Athletic; Winterton Rangers
- Matches: 272
- Goals: 946 (3.48 per match)

Division One featured 14 clubs which competed in the previous season, along with three clubs.

- Clubs joined from the West Yorkshire League:
  - AFC Emley
  - Nostell Miners Welfare
- Plus:
  - Dinnington Town, joined from the Central Midlands League

Also, Worsbrough Bridge Miners Welfare changed name to Worsbrough Bridge Athletic.

=== League table ===
| Pos | Team | Pld | W | D | L | GF | GA | GD | Pts | Promotion or relegation |
|---|---|---|---|---|---|---|---|---|---|---|
| 1 | Parkgate | 32 | 26 | 4 | 2 | 120 | 38 | +82 | 82 | Promoted to the Premier Division |
| 2 | Winterton Rangers | 32 | 23 | 2 | 7 | 90 | 38 | +52 | 71 | Promoted to the Premier Division |
| 3 | South Normanton Athletic | 32 | 20 | 5 | 7 | 76 | 34 | +42 | 65 | Promoted to the Premier Division |
| 4 | Nostell Miners Welfare | 32 | 20 | 0 | 12 | 66 | 41 | +25 | 57 (Note: Nostell Miners Welfare were deducted 3 points.) | Promoted to the Premier Division |
| 5 | Lincoln Moorlands | 32 | 17 | 5 | 10 | 63 | 42 | +21 | 56 | Promoted to the Premier Division |
| 6 | Staveley Miners Welfare | 32 | 16 | 3 | 13 | 57 | 50 | +7 | 51 | |
| 7 | Tadcaster Albion | 32 | 14 | 7 | 11 | 60 | 54 | +6 | 49 | |
| 8 | Worsbrough Bridge Athletic | 32 | 13 | 9 | 10 | 53 | 42 | +11 | 48 | |
| 9 | Dinnington Town | 32 | 12 | 7 | 13 | 52 | 46 | +6 | 43 | |
| 10 | Hall Road Rangers | 32 | 12 | 7 | 13 | 48 | 51 | −3 | 43 | |
| 11 | Borrowash Victoria | 32 | 10 | 7 | 15 | 38 | 52 | −14 | 37 | |
| 12 | Pontefract Collieries | 32 | 10 | 7 | 15 | 35 | 61 | −26 | 37 | |
| 13 | AFC Emley | 32 | 10 | 4 | 18 | 48 | 70 | −22 | 34 | |
| 14 | Gedling Town | 32 | 9 | 4 | 19 | 45 | 63 | −18 | 31 | |
| 15 | Teversal | 32 | 9 | 4 | 19 | 35 | 69 | −34 | 31 | |
| 16 | Yorkshire Amateur | 32 | 7 | 1 | 24 | 33 | 106 | −73 | 22 | |
| 17 | Rossington Main | 32 | 4 | 4 | 24 | 27 | 89 | −62 | 16 | |

Source: fchd
Rules for classification: 1) points; 2) goal difference; 3) number of goals scored.
