= 2014–15 Northern Counties East Football League =

The 2014–15 Northern Counties East Football League season was the 33rd in the history of the Northern Counties East Football League, a football competition in England.

== Premier Division ==
Northern Counties East Football League Premier Division
- Season: 2014–15
- Champions: Shaw Lane Aquaforce
- Promoted: Shaw Lane Aquaforce
- Relegated: Glasshoughton Welfare
- Matches: 420
- Goals: 1,583 (3.77 per match)

The Premier Division featured 18 clubs which competed in the previous season, along with four new clubs.

- Clubs promoted from Division One:
  - Cleethorpes Town
  - Shaw Lane Aquaforce
- Plus:
  - Handsworth Parramore, new club formed as a merger of Worksop Parramore and Sheffield & Hallam County Senior League club Handsworth
  - Worksop Town, demoted from the Northern Premier League

From this league seven teams - Barton Town Old Boys, Cleethorpes Town, Heanor Town, Shaw Lane Aquaforce, Staveley Miners Welfare, Tadcaster Albion and Worksop Town have applied for promotion.

=== League table ===
Pos	Team	Pld	W	D	L	GF	GA	GD	Pts	Promotion or relegation
1	Shaw Lane	40	29	7	4	130	33	+97	94	Promoted to the Northern Premier League Division One South
2	Worksop Town	40	28	6	6	126	38	+88	90	
3	Tadcaster Albion	40	27	5	8	112	46	+66	86	
4	Cleethorpes Town	40	27	3	10	108	52	+56	84	
5	Barton Town Old Boys	40	24	4	12	94	59	+35	76	
6	Heanor Town	40	23	5	12	92	43	+49	74	Transferred to the Midland League
7	Handsworth Parramore	40	22	8	10	90	45	+45	74	
8	Bridlington Town	40	20	11	9	80	54	+26	71	
9	Staveley Miners Welfare	40	20	6	14	68	57	+11	66	
10	Albion Sports	40	19	2	19	93	69	+24	59	
11	Pickering Town	40	17	8	15	79	82	−3	59	
12	Thackley	40	14	7	19	61	80	−19	49	
13	Athersley Recreation	40	13	8	19	52	68	−16	47	
14	Garforth Town	40	11	11	18	59	68	−9	44	
15	Nostell Miners Welfare	40	11	5	24	60	90	−30	38	
16	Parkgate	40	10	8	22	47	80	−33	38	
17	Armthorpe Welfare	40	10	7	23	54	110	−56	37	
18	Liversedge	40	9	7	24	46	93	−47	34	
19	Maltby Main	40	11	3	26	65	119	−54	33	
20	Retford United	40	5	6	29	37	137	−100	21	
21	Glasshoughton Welfare	40	5	3	32	30	160	−130	18	Relegated to Division One

Source: fchd
Rules for classification: 1) points; 2) goal difference; 3) number of goals scored.

=== Results ===
Home \ Away	ALB	ARM	ATR	BAR	BRI	CLE	GAR	GLW	HPA	HEA	LIV	MAL	NMW	PAR	PIC	RET	SAQ	SMW	TAD	THA	WKS
Albion Sports		7–1	2–1	0–2	1–2	0–1	3–1	9–2	1–4	0–3	5–2	1–0	0–2	1–1	4–1	3–2	1–2	3–1	0–1	4–0	3–2
Armthorpe Welfare	0–3		2–1	3–2	1–1	2–5	2–2	3–2	1–0	0–3	0–1	0–2	2–0	3–1	4–5	0–3	1–3	1–1	0–10	0–4	2–3
Athersley Recreation	3–1	2–1		1–3	1–2	1–0	2–1	4–2	0–0	1–2	3–1	1–2	2–1	0–2	3–3	0–0	0–4	1–0	0–1	3–0	0–2
Barton Town Old Boys	4–0	3–1	3–2		4–1	0–3	1–1	8–1	0–3	5–2	0–1	2–1	2–1	3–1	2–0	2–0	0–0	0–1	3–2	1–3	1–5
Bridlington Town	2–2	3–1	3–2	1–1		3–0	2–1	0–2	1–0	1–2	3–1	3–0	2–0	3–1	1–1	11–0	1–3	1–1	2–3	2–1	1–2
Cleethorpes Town	0–1	6–0	0–1	4–3	1–1		4–1	3–0	1–3	1–0	3–1	5–1	5–3	6–1	2–4	6–0	3–1	2–3	3–2	1–1	1–1
Garforth Town	3–1	1–1	1–0	2–1	1–1	0–1		5–0	0–1	0–2	1–1	2–5	2–2	3–1	0–1	6–1	2–2	1–2	1–2	0–2	1–0
Glasshoughton Welfare	1–6	2–1	0–2	0–4	0–1	0–5	1–3		0–3	0–8	2–1	4–1	0–5	0–1	1–4	0–3	0–12	1–4	0–2	1–1	1–6
Handsworth Parramore	4–0	1–1	2–1	2–1	5–1	0–3	4–0	6–0		2–0	1–2	5–1	5–0	2–1	2–3	4–2	2–2	1–1	0–3	5–1	1–0
Heanor Town	3–2	2–1	7–0	1–2	5–1	6–0	0–1	5–0	2–1		3–1	1–0	1–1	3–0	2–1	4–0	0–3	2–1	1–2	3–2	1–1
Liversedge	2–0	2–3	3–3	0–3	0–2	2–6	0–2	1–1	1–4	0–3		4–2	4–4	1–2	3–1	0–2	0–3	0–2	0–7	1–2	0–4
Maltby Main	1–4	2–2	2–3	1–2	2–4	1–2	4–2	2–3	0–3	3–2	0–1		2–0	1–4	1–1	9–3	0–11	1–2	2–3	3–1	1–2
Nostell Miners Welfare	2–0	1–2	1–0	1–4	0–3	1–5	6–1	3–0	2–1	0–3	1–0	1–4		2–2	2–4	2–0	1–3	2–1	2–4	0–2	2–4
Parkgate	1–3	2–1	1–0	4–4	1–1	0–2	3–2	1–1	0–2	1–1	1–1	1–2	0–1		2–1	6–1	1–5	1–2	1–4	0–2	0–3
Pickering Town	2–3	1–1	1–1	1–4	4–3	2–6	1–1	1–0	4–2	1–0	4–0	7–0	3–2	3–0		4–1	1–3	0–2	1–1	1–3	1–4
Retford United	0–8	1–5	1–2	1–3	0–0	0–3	1–1	4–1	1–3	0–6	2–2	3–3	1–0	0–1	0–1		1–3	0–4	1–4	0–1	0–6
Shaw Lane Aquaforce	2–1	6–1	1–1	2–3	0–0	3–1	3–2	9–0	2–2	1–0	0–1	5–0	1–1	2–0	6–0	5–0		4–0	1–0	9–0	2–1
Staveley Miners Welfare	4–2	1–0	3–1	3–2	1–4	0–3	0–3	3–0	0–0	3–2	0–0	1–2	3–1	1–1	2–3	5–0	0–1		2–1	5–1	0–1
Tadcaster Albion	2–1	5–0	1–1	3–2	1–1	0–3	2–0	5–1	3–3	3–0	3–0	6–0	4–2	2–0	2–1	5–1	1–2	5–0		1–2	1–2
Thackley	0–6	2–3	5–1	0–2	1–3	0–1	1–1	5–0	1–1	1–1	0–2	4–1	2–1	1–0	1–1	1–1	1–3	1–2	2–3		2–4
Worksop Town	2–1	8–1	1–1	0–2	1–2	3–1	1–1	10–0	2–0	0–0	5–3	8–0	6–1	4–0	5–0	7–0	3–0	2–1	2–2	3–1	

Source: League Official
Legend: Blue = home team win; Yellow = draw; Red = away team win.

=== Locations ===
Location of the clubs in the 2014-15
NCEL Premier Division

Club	Stadium	Capacity
Albion Sports	Throstle Nest (Note: home of Farsley - groundshare)	3,500
Armthorpe Welfare	Welfare Ground	2,500
Athersley Recreation	Sheerien Park	2,000
Barton Town Old Boys	Euronics Ground	3,000
Bridlington Town	Queensgate	3,000
Cleethorpes Town	Bradley Football Development Centre	3,000
Garforth Town	Wheatley Park	3,000
Glasshoughton Welfare	Glasshoughton Centre	2,000
Handsworth Parramore	Sandy Lane	2,500
Heanor Town	Town Ground	2,700
Liversedge	Clayborn Ground	2,000
Maltby Main	Muglet Lane	2,000
Nostell Miners Welfare	The Welfare Ground	1,500
Parkgate	Roundwood Sports Complex	1,000
Pickering Town	Recreation Club	2,000
Retford United	Cannon Park	2,000
Shaw Lane Aquaforce	Shaw Lane	
Staveley Miners Welfare	Inkersall Road	5,000
Tadcaster Albion	Ings Lane	1,500
Thackley	Dennyfield	3,000
Worksop Town	Sandy Lane (Note: home of Handsworth Parramore - groundshare)	2,500

== Division One ==
Northern Counties East Football League Division One
- Champions: Clipstone
- Promoted: Clipstone; Pontefract Collieries
- Matches: 462
- Goals: 1,749 (3.79 per match)
- Biggest home win: Rossington Main 12–1 Lincoln Moorlands Railway
- Biggest away win: Dronfield Town 0–8 Pontefract Collieries
- Highest scoring: Pontefract Collieries 12–2 Lincoln Moorlands Railway (14 goals)

Division One featured 18 clubs which competed in the previous season, along with four new clubs:

- Clubs relegated from the Premier Division:
  - Lincoln Moorlands Railway
  - Winterton Rangers
- Plus:
  - AFC Mansfield, promoted from the Central Midlands League
  - Penistone Church, promoted from the Sheffield and Hallamshire County Senior League

=== League table ===
Pos	Team	Pld	W	D	L	GF	GA	GD	Pts	Promotion or relegation
1	Clipstone	42	30	3	9	89	34	+55	93	Promoted to the Premier Division
2	Pontefract Collieries	42	29	4	9	113	43	+70	91	Promoted to the Premier Division
3	Hemsworth Miners Welfare	42	26	10	6	104	56	+48	88	
4	Shirebrook Town	42	26	6	10	111	54	+57	84	
5	AFC Emley	42	26	6	10	100	46	+54	84	
6	Louth Town	42	26	5	11	113	67	+46	83	Resigned at end of season
7	AFC Mansfield	42	25	7	10	110	55	+55	82	
8	Bottesford Town	42	22	10	10	78	47	+31	76	
9	Penistone Church	42	20	7	15	79	68	+11	67	
10	Yorkshire Amateur	42	20	6	16	86	80	+6	66	
11	Selby Town	42	17	10	15	73	74	−1	61	
12	Knaresborough Town	42	16	7	19	72	65	+7	55	
13	Eccleshill United	42	16	5	21	76	67	+9	53	
14	Hallam	42	16	4	22	81	88	−7	52	
15	Rossington Main	42	12	9	21	75	80	−5	45	
16	Worsbrough Bridge Athletic	42	11	11	20	60	84	−24	44	
17	Hall Road Rangers	42	12	7	23	54	97	−43	43	
18	Winterton Rangers	42	9	9	24	48	96	−48	36	
19	Dronfield Town	42	9	8	25	58	96	−38	35	
20	Teversal	42	8	7	27	55	117	−62	31	
21	Lincoln Moorlands Railway	42	7	3	32	61	174	−113	24	
22	Grimsby Borough	42	4	6	32	53	161	−108	18	

Source: fchd
Rules for classification: 1) points; 2) goal difference; 3) number of goals scored.

=== Results ===
Home \ Away	AFE	AFCM	BOT	CLW	DRO	ECC	GRB	HRR	HAL	HMW	KNA	LIN	LOU	PCH	POC	ROM	SEL	SHI	TEV	WIR	WBA	YOA
AFC Emley		1–1	3–1	1–2	2–0	2–1	4–0	7–0	1–1	0–3	3–0	8–0	7–2	1–0	1–0	4–0	1–2	1–0	3–2	4–0	1–2	1–3
AFC Mansfield	3–1		1–2	1–2	2–0	2–0	5–0	5–3	3–1	1–1	4–1	4–1	2–2	2–0	3–1	3–0	0–1	3–3	4–1	3–0	2–1	3–0
Bottesford Town	2–2	1–1		1–1	6–0	2–1	8–0	3–1	4–1	0–0	0–0	0–2	1–0	0–1	1–1	1–0	2–2	0–5	4–1	1–0	2–1	0–0
Clipstone	2–0	2–1	2–0		3–0	1–0	4–2	5–1	1–2	1–2	2–0	2–0	4–2	0–1	0–2	3–0	2–1	0–2	5–0	4–0	2–1	1–0
Dronfield Town	0–1	0–5	0–3	0–0		4–1	0–1	1–1	1–2	2–4	1–1	4–5	2–3	0–1	0–8	1–0	2–1	3–1	3–1	0–1	1–5	2–4
Eccleshill United	0–1	2–1	1–3	0–0	1–2		4–0	2–0	6–0	1–2	1–3	9–0	0–6	1–2	2–3	2–1	4–1	4–0	4–3	1–1	2–1	2–1
Grimsby Borough	1–8	2–3	2–3	1–6	2–6	2–4		3–1	0–5	1–3	1–6	1–1	0–5	0–5	0–2	0–1	2–2	1–7	2–2	2–2	5–2	4–7
Hall Road Rangers	1–3	0–6	0–3	0–3	2–0	1–0	3–1		0–2	1–4	0–6	3–2	2–1	3–5	0–3	0–0	0–1	0–0	3–1	3–0	0–0	1–5
Hallam	0–1	3–2	0–1	3–2	4–1	2–1	7–2	1–3		3–1	0–5	0–3	1–3	0–2	3–0	4–2	0–3	2–3	2–2	3–0	0–0	0–2
Hemsworth Miners Welfare	0–2	2–1	0–0	1–3	4–2	2–1	6–0	3–1	3–3		0–3	7–2	0–4	4–4	1–2	8–1	1–1	1–0	1–1	2–1	2–2	5–2
Knaresborough Town	0–1	1–2	1–2	0–1	2–2	2–1	1–0	1–2	2–1	0–3		5–0	0–3	1–4	1–2	2–1	1–1	0–3	1–2	1–2	2–2	0–0
Lincoln Moorlands Railway	0–1	0–4	2–6	1–3	1–7	0–4	7–2	3–3	1–8	0–1	2–3		0–7	1–6	0–7	1–2	2–3	0–2	6–2	2–2	2–1	1–5
Louth Town	2–1	1–5	0–3	1–4	2–1	2–1	1–0	4–1	3–2	2–2	2–2	2–0		2–0	4–2	3–0	2–1	2–4	3–0	1–1	5–0	7–0
Penistone Church	2–3	4–3	2–2	1–0	0–0	0–2	2–4	0–2	3–1	0–0	3–1	1–2	3–0		0–7	3–2	3–3	2–0	2–3	3–0	1–0	1–0
Pontefract Collieries	0–0	2–4	2–0	2–1	3–0	1–0	5–2	2–0	2–0	1–3	1–0	12–2	1–3	2–1		3–1	3–1	3–1	4–0	3–0	0–2	2–0
Rossington Main	4–2	2–2	2–1	0–4	1–1	4–0	4–0	1–1	5–1	1–2	1–2	12–1	0–3	3–1	0–0		1–3	1–1	2–2	3–1	1–1	2–3
Selby Town	1–1	1–4	0–3	2–1	1–1	2–2	1–0	2–1	1–4	1–4	4–2	6–1	3–1	3–0	0–3	2–1		0–4	1–0	2–0	1–2	4–0
Shirebrook Town	1–1	2–3	3–1	1–3	3–0	3–1	5–0	2–2	4–1	1–4	3–2	6–2	2–1	2–0	1–1	4–2	3–1		0–1	3–0	4–2	2–1
Teversal	2–5	3–2	2–0	0–1	1–0	2–4	3–3	0–4	0–5	1–2	1–4	3–0	3–5	2–6	0–1	0–3	1–1	2–7		1–1	1–5	1–2
Winterton Rangers	0–5	1–1	1–3	0–1	2–1	1–1	2–2	3–0	3–1	0–2	1–2	2–1	2–4	3–1	2–6	1–6	4–3	0–3	3–1		1–2	1–1
Worsbrough Bridge Athletic	2–3	1–2	0–1	0–3	2–4	1–1	3–2	3–1	2–0	0–4	0–4	3–0	2–2	1–1	1–7	1–1	1–1	0–6	0–1	4–3		1–1
Yorkshire Amateur	3–2	3–1	3–1	1–2	3–3	0–1	5–0	0–3	4–2	3–4	0–1	5–4	2–5	2–2	2–1	2–1	4–2	0–4	3–0	3–0	1–0	

Source: League Official
Legend: Blue = home team win; Yellow = draw; Red = away team win.

=== Locations ===
Location of the clubs in the 2014-15
NCEL Division One

Club	Stadium	Capacity
A.F.C. Emley	The Welfare Ground	2,000
A.F.C. Mansfield	Forest Town Stadium	
Bottesford Town	Birch Park	1,000
Clipstone	Clipstone Road	500
Dronfield Town	Stonelow Ground	500
Eccleshill United	Kings Way	2,225
Grimsby Borough	Bradley Football Development Centre	1,000
Hall Road Rangers	Dene Park	1,200
Hallam	Sandygate Road	1,000
Hemsworth Miners Welfare	Fitzwilliam Stadium	2,000
Knaresborough Town	Manse Lane	1,000
Lincoln Moorlands Railway	Lincoln Moorlands Railway Club	
Louth Town	Park Avenue	1,500
Penistone Church	Church View Road	
Pontefract Collieries	Skinner Lane	1,200
Rossington Main	Welfare Ground	2,000
Selby Town	Richard Street	5,000
Shirebrook Town	Langwith Road	2,000
Teversal	Teversal Grange	2,000
Winterton Rangers	West Street	3,000
Worsbrough Bridge Athletic	Park Road	2,000
Yorkshire Amateur	Bracken Edge	1,550

== League Cup ==
2014–15 Northern Counties East Football League League Cup
Tournament details
- Country: England
- Teams: 43

The 2014–15 Northern Counties East Football League League Cup was the 33rd season of the league cup competition of the Northern Counties East Football League.

=== First round ===
Home team	Score	Away team	Attendance
Clipstone	4 – 2	Hemsworth Miners Welfare	39
Penistone Church	2 – 1	Teversal	105
Pontefract Collieries	3 – 2†	Dronfield Town	37

Home team	Score	Away team	Attendance
Selby Town	3 – 1	Louth Town	60
Winterton Rangers	1 – 2	Shirebrook Town	56
Yorkshire Amateur	4 – 0	Hall Road Rangers	41

- † = After Extra Time

=== Second round ===
Home team	Score	Away team	Attendance
A.F.C. Emley	3 – 5	Eccleshill United	102
Cleethorpes Town	3 – 2	Penistone Church	72
Grimsby Borough	1 – 5	Bottesford Town	30

Home team	Score	Away team	Attendance
Heanor Town	1 – 5	Garforth Town	148
Nostell Miners Welfare	2 – 5	Handsworth Parramore	51
Tadcaster Albion	2 – 0	Knaresborough Town	130

=== Third round ===
Home team	Score	Away team	Attendance
Albion Sports	4 – 1	Yorkshire Amateur	51
Armthorpe Welfare	0 – 5	Handsworth Parramore	56
Athersley Recreation	1 – 3†	Worksop Town	133
Bottesford Town	2 – 4	Staveley Miners Welfare	54
Clipstone	5 – 0	Liversedge	27
Eccleshill United	1 – 3	A.F.C. Mansfield	17
Glasshoughton Welfare	2 – 1	Bridlington Town	22
Parkgate	1 – 4	Cleethorpes Town	53

Home team	Score	Away team	Attendance
Pickering Town	6 – 0	Barton Town Old Boys	141
Pontefract Collieries	2 – 1	Maltby Main	34
Rossington Main	0 – 2	Lincoln Moorlands Railway	28
Selby Town	0 – 2	Garforth Town	80
Shirebrook Town	2 – 4	Retford United	116
Thackley	1 – 3	Shaw Lane Aquaforce	43
Worsbrough Bridge Athletic	0 – 4	Hallam	76

- † = After Extra Time

=== Fourth round ===
Home team	Score	Away team	Attendance
Albion Sports	2 – 3	Staveley Miners Welfare	17
Glasshoughton Welfare	0 – 2	A.F.C. Mansfield	42
Hallam	1 – 0	Garforth Town	48
Handsworth Parramore	3 – 1	Shaw Lane Aquaforce	83

Home team	Score	Away team	Attendance
Lincoln Moorlands Railway	2 – 1	Worksop Town	70
Pickering Town	2 – 3	Cleethorpes Town	123
Pontefract Collieries	0 – 2	Clipstone	52
Retford United	1 – 6	Tadcaster Albion	113

=== Fifth round ===
Home team	Score	Away team	Attendance
Staveley Miners Welfare	0 – 1	AFC Mansfield	254
Cleethorpes Town	3 – 0	Clipstone	

Home team	Score	Away team	Attendance
Handsworth Parramore	3 - 0	Hallam	65
Lincoln Moorlands Railway	1 – 4	Tadcaster Albion	26

=== Semi-finals ===
Home team	Score	Away team	Attendance
AFC Mansfield	1 – 2	Handsworth Parramore	

Home team	Score	Away team	Attendance
Tadcaster Albion	1 – 4	Cleethorpes Town	

=== Final ===
Match at Staveley Miners Welfare's ground.

Home team	Score	Away team	Attendance
Cleethorpes Town	3 - 4	Handsworth Parramore	376
