= Albion Sports A.F.C. =

Association football club in England

Coordinates: 53.799°N 1.728°W

Albion Sports
- Full name: Albion Sports Association Football Club
- Nickname: The Lions
- Founded: 1974
- Ground: Myra Shay, Bradford
- Chairman: Charanjit Singh Basi
- Manager: Neil Sibson
- League: Northern Counties East League Premier Division
- 2025–26: Northern Counties East League Premier Division, 19th of 20
Home colours	Away colours

Albion Sports Association Football Club is a football club located in Bradford, West Yorkshire, England. The club are currently members of the Premier Division of the Northern Counties East League and play at Myra Shay. The club's kit consists of yellow and royal blue shirts with royal blue shorts and socks.

== History ==
The club was founded in 1974 by Harjit Singh Panesar and Baljit Singh, and joined Division Four of the Bradford Amateur Sunday League, which they won in their first season. They won the Premier Division in 1995–96 and in 1999–2000, a season in which they also won the Bradford Sunday Senior Cup and the British Asian Championship, as well as reaching the final of the FA Sunday Cup, where they lost 1–0 to Hull-based Prestige Brighams. They won the Premier Division again in 2000–01, 2002–03, 2004–05 and 2005–06, as well as reaching the final of the FA Sunday Cup again in 2005, losing 3–2 to Gossoms End of London.

In 2007 the club switched to Saturday football, joining the Bradford League, before switching to the West Riding County Amateur League the following year. They finished second in Division One in 2008–09, earning promotion to the Premier Division. After finishing as runners-up in the Premier Division in 2009–10 and 2010–11, the club were promoted to Division One of the Northern Counties East League.

After missing out on promotion by one point in their first season in the division, in 2012–13 the club won Division One and were promoted to the Premier Division. They finished fifth in the Premier Division in 2023–24, qualifying for the promotion play-offs. After beating Campion 2–0 in the semi-finals, the club lost the final to Garforth Town on penalties.

=== Season-by-season record ===
Season	Division	Level	Position	FA Cup	FA Vase
2008–09	West Riding County Amateur League Division One	12	2/14	–	–
2009–10	West Riding County Amateur League Premier Division	11	2/16	–	–
2010–11	West Riding County Amateur League Premier Division	11	2/16	–	–
2011–12	Northern Counties East League Premier Division	10	11/20	–	–
2012–13	Northern Counties East League Division One	10	1/22	–	2QR
2013–14	Northern Counties East League Premier Division	9	6/23	1QR	2QR
2014–15	Northern Counties East League Premier Division	9	10/21	PR	2QR
2015–16	Northern Counties East League Premier Division	9	11/22	EPR	1QR
2016–17	Northern Counties East League Premier Division	9	8/22	EPR	1QR
2017–18	Northern Counties East League Premier Division	9	14/22	2QR	1QR
Season	Division	Level	Position	FA Cup	FA Vase
Source: Non-League Matters, Football Club History Database

== Ground ==
After joining the Northern Counties East League in 2011 the club started groundsharing at the Horsfall Stadium of Bradford (Park Avenue). In 2013 they relocated to the Throstle Nest ground of Farsley Celtic, where they played until returning to the Horsfall Stadium in 2023.

In 2025 the club relocated to the Myra Shay ground.

== Honours ==
- Northern Counties East League
  - Division One champions 2012–13
- Bradford Amateur Sunday League:
  - Premier Division champions 1995–96, 1999–2000, 2000–01, 2002–03, 2004–05, 2005–06
  - Division Four champions 1974–75
- British Asian Championship
  - Winners: 1999–2000, 2004–05
- Bradford Sunday Senior Cup
  - Winners: 1986–87, 1990–91, 1995–96, 1996–97, 1999–2000, 2002–03, 2004–05
- Bradford District Sunday Cup
  - Winners 1994–95, 1998–99

== Records ==
- Best FA Cup performance: Second qualifying round, 2017–18, 2023–24
- Best FA Vase performance: Fourth round, 2024–25

== See also ==
- Albion Sports A.F.C. players
