= Joseph Marsh (disambiguation) =

Joseph Marsh (1726–1811) was an American revolutionary.

Joseph or Joe Marsh may also refer to:

- Joseph Marsh (Adventist) (1802–1863), American Millerite Protestant preacher
- Joe Marsh (footballer), English footballer
- Joe Marsh (ice hockey) (born 1951), Canadian ice hockey coach
- Joe Marsh (bowls) (1928–2025), South African lawn bowler
- Joseph Marsh (priest) (1803–1838), Scottish Anglican priest and educationist
