= 2016–17 FA Trophy =

Football Association Trophy

Tournament details
- Country: England; Wales
- Teams: 276

Final positions
- Champions: York City
- Runners-up: Macclesfield Town

The 2016–17 FA Trophy was the 47th season of the FA Trophy, the Football Association's cup competition for teams at levels 5–8 of the English football league system. A total of 276 clubs entered the competition, which was won by York City after beating Macclesfield Town 3–2 in front of 38,224 spectators at Wembley in the final on 21 May 2017.

== Calendar ==
Round	Main date	Number of fixtures	Clubs	New entries this round	Prize money
Preliminary round	8 October 2016	64	276 → 212	128	£2,500
First round qualifying	29 October 2016	72	212 → 140	80	£2,700
Second round qualifying	12 November 2016	36	140 → 104	none	£3,250
Third round qualifying	26 November 2016	40	104 → 64	44	£4,000
First round proper	10 December 2016	32	64 → 32	24	£5,000
Second round proper	14 January 2017	16	32 → 16	none	£6,000
Third round proper	4 February 2017	8	16 → 8	none	£7,000
Fourth round proper	25 February 2017	4	8 → 4	none	£8,000
Semi-finals	11 March and 18 March 2017	2	4 → 2	none	£16,000
Final	21 May 2017	1	2 → 1	none	Runner-up £25,000; Winner £50,000

== Preliminary round ==
A total of 128 clubs, from Level 8 of English football, entered preliminary round of the competition. Eight clubs from level 8 get a bye to the first round qualifying - Beaconsfield SYCOB, Heybridge Swifts, Kidsgrove Athletic, Market Drayton Town, Phoenix Sports, Waltham Abbey, Walton Casuals and Ware.

Tie	Home team (tier)	Score	Away team (tier)	Att.
1	Witton Albion (8)	5–2	Brighouse Town (8)	235
2	Glossop North End (8)	2–0	Tadcaster Albion (8)	369
3	Prescot Cables (8)	1–1	Ossett Albion (8)	290
replay	Ossett Albion (8)	0–1	Prescot Cables (8)	87
4	Colne (8)	1–2	Trafford (8)	181
5	Burscough (8)	1–2	Kendal Town (8)	110
6	Clitheroe (8)	0–5	Stocksbridge Park Steels (8)	270
7	Colwyn Bay (8)	1–0	Hyde United (8)	268
8	Northwich Victoria (8)	1–1	Mossley (8)	132
replay	Mossley (8)	3–2	Northwich Victoria (8)	65
9	Shaw Lane (8)	2–0	Scarborough Athletic (8)	304
10	Belper Town (8)	1–2	Goole (8)	248
11	Radcliffe Borough (8)	1–3	Farsley Celtic (8)	119
12	Lancaster City (8)	1–1	Droylsden (8)	233
replay	Droylsden (8)	1–3	Lancaster City (8)	102
13	Ramsbottom United (8)	3–1	Sheffield (8)	253
14	Ossett Town (8)	0–1	Bamber Bridge (8)	141
15	Bedworth United (8)	3–3	Rugby Town (8)	223
replay	Rugby Town (8)	0–2	Bedworth United (8)	132
16	Stamford (8)	1–0	Basford United (8)	257
17	AFC Rushden & Diamonds (8)	1–1	Histon (8)	333
replay	Histon (8)	1–6	AFC Rushden & Diamonds (8)	151
18	Gresley (8)	4–1	Spalding United (8)	243
19	Carlton Town (8)	3–1	Chasetown (8)	108
20	Newcastle Town (8)	1–3	Soham Town Rangers (8)	127
21	Loughborough Dynamo (8)	1–2	Leek Town (8)	139
22	Lincoln United (8)	2–2	Romulus (8)	171
replay	Romulus (8)	1–3 (a.e.t.)	Lincoln United (8)	80
23	Aylesbury (8)	1–3	Ware (8)	56
24	Sittingbourne (8)	0–2	Bury Town (8)	150
25	Maldon & Tiptree (8)	3–1	Great Wakering Rovers (8)	115
26	East Grinstead Town (8)	4–0	Three Bridges (8)	141
27	Witham Town (8)	2–1	Aveley (8)	102
28	Cray Wanderers (8)	3–3	Carshalton Athletic (8)	187
Match replayed at Cray Wanderers after an FA Investigation found that Carshalton Athletic fielded an ineligible player in the original tie.
replay*	Cray Wanderers (8)	3–0	Carshalton Athletic (8)	91
29	Potters Bar Town (8)	0–2	Horsham (8)	131
30	Thurrock (8)	1–2	Bowers & Pitsea (8)	83
31	Chipstead (8)	3–3	Kempston Rovers (8)	65
replay	Kempston Rovers (8)	2–0	Chipstead (8)	88

Tie	Home team (tier)	Score	Away team (tier)	Att.
32	Aylesbury United (8)	4–1	Chatham Town (8)	99
33	Uxbridge (8)	4–0	AFC Dunstable (8)	64
34	Lewes (8)	1–1	Tilbury (8)	422
replay	Tilbury (8)	0–3	Lewes (8)	80
35	South Park (8)	2–0	Guernsey (8)	112
36	Whyteleafe (8)	1–3	Cheshunt (8)	141
37	Haringey Borough (8)	1–2	Hythe Town (8)	86
38	Dorking Wanderers (8)	3–6	Northwood (8)	130
39	Wroxham (8)	3–0	Godalming Town (8)	71
40	Norwich United (8)	0–2	Tooting & Mitcham United (8)	156
41	Ramsgate (8)	0–3	Hastings United (8)	192
42	AFC Hornchurch (8)	2–3	Ashford Town (Mx) (8)	162
43	Molesey (8)	1–3	Romford (8)	63
44	Brentwood Town (8)	1–2	Marlow (8)	92
45	Arlesey Town (8)	2–2	Chalfont St Peter (8)	72
replay	Chalfont St Peter (8)	6–0	Arlesey Town (8)	40
46	Corinthian Casuals (8)	2–1	Thamesmead Town (8)	121
47	Brightlingsea Regent (8)	2–1	Dereham Town (8)	102
48	VCD Athletic (8)	1–1	Greenwich Borough (8)	97
replay	Greenwich Borough (8)	1–2	VCD Athletic (8)	115
49	Royston Town (8)	3–0	Egham Town (8)	144
50	Hanwell Town (8)	4–0	Bedford Town (8)	123
51	Barton Rovers (8)	0–1	Herne Bay (8)	101
52	Slimbridge (8)	1–3	Swindon Supermarine (8)	60
53	Bridgwater Town (8)	2–2	North Leigh (8)	109
replay	North Leigh (8)	4–1	Bridgwater Town (8)	37
54	Winchester City (8)	1–1	Petersfield Town (8)	140
replay	Petersfield Town (8)	1–3 (a.e.t.)	Winchester City (8)	115
55	Wimborne Town (8)	2–2	AFC Totton (8)	264
replay	AFC Totton (8)	1–2	Wimborne Town (8)	184
56	Salisbury (8)	4–3	Hereford (8)	1,225
57	Paulton Rovers (8)	1–6	Tiverton Town (8)	112
58	Bishop's Cleeve (8)	1–0	Didcot Town (8)	80
59	Mangotsfield United (8)	0–2	Yate Town (8)	310
60	Farnborough (8)	1–5	Barnstaple Town (8)	172
61	Fleet Town (8)	2–1	Bideford (8)	83
62	Kidlington (8)	2–3	Wantage Town (8)	79
63	Taunton Town (8)	6–2	Larkhall Athletic (8)	362
64	Shortwood United (8)	0–1	Evesham United (8)	134

== First round qualifying ==
A total of 144 teams took part in this stage of the competition including 64 winners from the preliminary round, 72 teams from Level 7 of English football and eight teams from level 8, who get a bye in the previous round.

Tie	Home team (tier)	Score	Away team (tier)	Att.
1	Goole (8)	1–1	Blyth Spartans (7)	252
replay	Blyth Spartans (7)	7–1	Goole (8)	440
2	Spennymoor Town (7)	1–2	Matlock Town (7)	393
3	Warrington Town (7)	0–2	Nantwich Town (7)	274
4	Stocksbridge Park Steels (8)	2–1	Lancaster City (8)	128
5	Whitby Town (7)	4–3	Workington (7)	321
6	Skelmersdale United (7)	1–3	Kendal Town (8)	175
7	Colwyn Bay (8)	1–1	Witton Albion (8)	298
replay	Witton Albion (8)	3–1	Colwyn Bay (8)	257
8	Mossley (8)	1–3	Farsley Celtic (8)	124
9	Ramsbottom United (8)	2–1	Prescot Cables (8)	216
10	Bamber Bridge (8)	0–2	Trafford (8)	169
11	Buxton (7)	2–0	Glossop North End (8)	518
12	Ashton United (7)	0–4	Marine (7)	124
13	Shaw Lane (8)	6–2	Frickley Athletic (7)	256
14	Stratford Town (7)	2–2	Grantham Town (7)	204
replay	Grantham Town (7)	4–0	Stratford Town (7)	142
15	Leamington (7)	0–1	Mickleover Sports (7)	352
16	Kidsgrove Athletic (8)	5–3	Soham Town Rangers (8)	151
17	Rushall Olympic (7)	1–2	Halesowen Town (7)	189
18	Ilkeston (7)	0–2	Barwell (7)	262
19	Carlton Town (8)	1–4	St Ives Town (7)	93
20	Stourbridge (7)	1–2	King's Lynn Town (7)	465
21	Corby Town (7)	0–2	Stafford Rangers (7)	435
22	Kettering Town (7)	5–1	Market Drayton Town (8)	357
23	Redditch United (7)	3–1	Cambridge City (7)	242
24	Stamford (8)	1–4	Hednesford Town (7)	345
25	Leek Town (8)	2–1	Sutton Coldfield Town (7)	315
26	AFC Rushden & Diamonds (8)	1–0	Coalville Town (7)	448
27	Bedworth United (8)	2–3	St Neots Town (7)	122
28	Lincoln United (8)	4–2	Gresley (8)	202
29	Horsham (8)	1–3	Romford (8)	291
30	East Grinstead Town (8)	2–3	Phoenix Sports (8)	95
31	Kingstonian (7)	2–1	Lewes (8)	245
32	Hastings United (8)	4–0	Aylesbury United (8)	322
33	Hythe Town (8)	3–2	Walton Casuals (8)	179
34	Burgess Hill Town (7)	5–1	Beaconsfield SYCOB (8)	226
35	Leatherhead (7)	2–3	Chesham United (7)	255
36	Waltham Abbey (8)	0–5	Merstham (7)	72
37	Hanwell Town (8)	2–1	Bury Town (8)	116

Tie	Home team (tier)	Score	Away team (tier)	Att.
38	Metropolitan Police (7)	2–6	Brightlingsea Regent (8)	124
39	Needham Market (7)	2–0	Wroxham (8)	205
40	Slough Town (7)	4–1	Bognor Regis Town (7)	543
41	Grays Athletic (7)	1–1	Wingate & Finchley (7)	146
replay	Wingate & Finchley (7)	2–0	Grays Athletic (7)	96
42	Worthing (7)	3–1	Kempston Rovers (8)	418
43	AFC Sudbury (7)	4–0	Bowers & Pitsea (8)	196
44	Tonbridge Angels (7)	3–3	Ashford Town (Mx) (8)	381
replay	Ashford Town (Mx) (8)	1–4	Tonbridge Angels (7)	227
45	Kings Langley (7)	1–0	Heybridge Swifts (8)	61
46	Leiston (7)	5–0	Hendon (7)	173
47	VCD Athletic (8)	1–3	Ware (8)	68
48	Enfield Town (7)	3–2	Canvey Island (7)	273
49	Tooting & Mitcham United (8)	2–4	Dunstable Town (7)	185
50	Billericay Town (7)	2–0	Maldon & Tiptree (8)	337
51	Chalfont St Peter (8)	3–2	Corinthian Casuals (8)	69
52	Cray Wanderers (8)	4–0	Marlow (8)	75
53	Cheshunt (8)	1–3	Folkestone Invicta (7)	144
54	Royston Town (8)	2–2	Northwood (8)	155
replay	Northwood (8)	1–4	Royston Town (8)	95
55	Lowestoft Town (7)	1–2	Dulwich Hamlet (7)	428
56	Biggleswade Town (7)	1–0	Witham Town (8)	111
57	Faversham Town (8)	3–4	South Park (8)	175
58	Uxbridge (8)	0–1	Harlow Town (7)	115
59	Herne Bay (8)	2–2	Harrow Borough (7)	195
replay	Harrow Borough (7)	3–0	Herne Bay (8)	96
60	Hayes & Yeading United (7)	0–1	Hitchin Town (7)	127
61	Evesham United (8)	1–1	Frome Town (7)	235
replay	Frome Town (7)	1–0	Evesham United (8)	152
62	Yate Town (8)	1–6	North Leigh (8)	118
63	Salisbury (8)	2–3	Chippenham Town (7)	904
64	Taunton Town (8)	5–0	Swindon Supermarine (8)	493
65	Tiverton Town (8)	0–1	Wimborne Town (8)	191
66	Cirencester Town (7)	1–2	Havant & Waterlooville (7)	141
67	Merthyr Town (7)	6–1	Cinderford Town (7)	283
68	Banbury United (7)	0–1	Bishop's Cleeve (8)	220
69	Fleet Town (8)	1–2	Winchester City (8)	93
70	Weymouth (7)	4–0	Wantage Town (8)	402
71	Dorchester Town (7)	3–1	Barnstaple Town (8)	344
72	Staines Town (7)	1–4	Basingstoke Town (7)	291

== Second round qualifying ==
A total of 72 teams took part in this stage of the competition, all winners from the first qualifying round.

Tie	Home team (tier)	Score	Away team (tier)	Att.
1	Nantwich Town (7)	2–0	Kendal Town (8)	251
2	Blyth Spartans (7)	4–3	Halesowen Town (7)	565
3	Buxton (7)	1–3	King's Lynn Town (7)	302
4	Marine (7)	1–1	St Neots Town (7)	288
replay	St Neots Town (7)	2–4 (a.e.t.)	Marine (7)	178
5	Hednesford Town (7)	1–1	Stafford Rangers (7)	910
replay	Stafford Rangers (7)	2–1 (a.e.t.)	Hednesford Town (7)	1,005
6	St Ives Town (7)	2–1	Leek Town (8)	160
7	Shaw Lane (8)	3–0	Whitby Town (7)	320
8	Ramsbottom United (8)	4–1	Redditch United (7)	139
9	Kidsgrove Athletic (8)	3–5	Stocksbridge Park Steels (8)	165
10	Barwell (7)	2–3	Farsley Celtic (8)	159
11	Grantham Town (7)	0–2	Matlock Town (7)	259
12	Trafford (8)	0–1	Mickleover Sports (7)	206
13	AFC Rushden & Diamonds (8)	3–3	Lincoln United (8)	485
replay	Lincoln United (8)	2–0	AFC Rushden & Diamonds (8)	229
14	Witton Albion (8)	2–1	Kettering Town (7)	339
15	Kings Langley (7)	1–0	Enfield Town (7)	222
16	Bishop's Cleeve (8)	0–1	Taunton Town (8)	72
17	Dunstable Town (7)	1–4	Weymouth (7)	106
18	Dorchester Town (7)	0–3	Basingstoke Town (7)	306
19	Merthyr Town (7)	2–2	Slough Town (7)	370
replay	Slough Town (7)	2–0	Merthyr Town (7)	429
20	Havant & Waterlooville (7)	5–0	Billericay Town (7)	256

Tie	Home team (tier)	Score	Away team (tier)	Att.
21	Brightlingsea Regent (8)	A–A*	Harlow Town (7)	177
Match abandoned at half due to floodlight failure when the score was 0-0.
21	Brightlingsea Regent (8)	1–1	Harlow Town (7)	234
replay	Harlow Town (7)	2–1	Brightlingsea Regent (8)	228
22	Hanwell Town (8)	0–1	Frome Town (7)	104
23	Chippenham Town (7)	0–1	Leiston (7)	306
24	Dulwich Hamlet (7)	4–0	Chesham United (7)	716
25	Merstham (7)	0–3	Hythe Town (8)	105
26	Burgess Hill Town (7)	2–2	Chalfont St Peter (8)	185
replay	Chalfont St Peter (8)	1–1 (7–8 p)	Burgess Hill Town (7)	54
27	Biggleswade Town (7)	1–1	Hitchin Town (7)	325
replay	Hitchin Town (7)	3–2	Biggleswade Town (7)	201
28	Folkestone Invicta (7)	2–3	North Leigh (8)	291
29	Royston Town (8)	4–0	Wimborne Town (8)	180
30	Needham Market (7)	1–2	Harrow Borough (7)	203
31	Cray Wanderers (8)	1–2	Worthing (7)	164
32	Phoenix Sports (8)	1–3	Winchester City (8)	67
33	Hastings United (8)	1–1	South Park (8)	280
replay	South Park (8)	3–2 (a.e.t.)	Hastings United (8)	84
34	AFC Sudbury (7)	4–0	Romford (8)	219
35	Kingstonian (7)	1–1	Tonbridge Angels (7)	318
replay	Tonbridge Angels (7)	1–2	Kingstonian (7)	286
36	Ware (8)	0–2	Wingate & Finchley (7)	93

== Third round qualifying ==
A total of 80 teams took part in this stage of the competition, all winners from the second round qualifying and 44 clubs from Level 6 of English football.

Tie	Home team (tier)	Score	Away team (tier)	Att.
1	Stocksbridge Park Steels (8)	2–2	Stalybridge Celtic (6)	142
replay	Stalybridge Celtic (6)	2–3	Stocksbridge Park Steels (8)	140
2	Harrogate Town (6)	2–2	Salford City (6)	571
replay	Salford City (6)	0–3	Harrogate Town (6)	283
3	Witton Albion (8)	A–A	Boston United (6)	355
Match abandoned at half time due to fog when the score was 1–0.
3	Witton Albion (8)	4–2	Boston United (6)	194
4	Mickleover Sports (7)	1–1	Brackley Town (6)	150
replay	Brackley Town (6)	3–1	Mickleover Sports (7)	140
5	Gainsborough Trinity (6)	0–0	Alfreton Town (6)	308
replay	Alfreton Town (6)	4–1 (a.e.t.)	Gainsborough Trinity (6)	175
6	King's Lynn Town (7)	1–0	St Ives Town (7)	684
7	Shaw Lane (8)	3–1	Nantwich Town (7)	215
Match awarded to Nantwich Town as Shaw Lane fielded an ineligible player.
8	Altrincham (6)	2–2	Blyth Spartans (7)	276
replay	Blyth Spartans (7)	2–3	Altrincham (6)	523
9	Ramsbottom United (8)	0–2	AFC Telford United (6)	319
10	Matlock Town (7)	1–1	FC Halifax Town (6)	483
replay	FC Halifax Town (6)	2–3	Matlock Town (7)	479
11	Farsley Celtic (8)	2–2	Tamworth (6)	227
replay	Tamworth (6)	0–4	Farsley Celtic (8)	371
12	Chorley (6)	1–0	Stafford Rangers (7)	466
13	Kidderminster Harriers (6)	3–1	Lincoln United (8)	916
14	Curzon Ashton (6)	1–2	Worcester City (6)	193
15	FC United of Manchester (6)	1–5	Nuneaton Town (6)	736
16	Stockport County (6)	2–0	Bradford Park Avenue (6)	1,164
17	Gloucester City (6)	2–3	AFC Fylde (6)	240
18	Darlington 1883 (6)	2–2	Marine (7)	743
replay	Marine (7)	3–2	Darlington 1883 (6)	308

Tie	Home team (tier)	Score	Away team (tier)	Att.
19	Ebbsfleet United (6)	4–2	Harrow Borough (7)	613
20	Slough Town (7)	2–4	Wingate & Finchley (7)	352
21	Truro City (6)	6–1	Frome Town (7)	269
22	Hampton & Richmond Borough (6)	0–0	Royston Town (8)	272
replay	Royston Town (8)	2–1	Hampton & Richmond Borough (6)	198
23	Concord Rangers (6)	0–1	Welling United (6)	161
24	Kings Langley (7)	1–3	AFC Sudbury (7)	151
25	Weston-super-Mare (6)	2–4	Dartford (6)	240
26	Worthing (7)	1–1	Hemel Hempstead Town (6)	505
replay	Hemel Hempstead Town (6)	0–1	Worthing (7)	157
27	Hungerford Town (6)	0–1	Gosport Borough (6)	144
28	Oxford City (6)	1–2	South Park (8)	157
29	Bath City (6)	2–0	Basingstoke Town (7)	366
30	Chelmsford City (6)	1–0	Taunton Town (8)	507
31	Margate (6)	1–1	East Thurrock United (6)	185
replay	East Thurrock United (6)	2–0	Margate (6)	174
32	Leiston (7)	1–1	Eastbourne Borough (6)	212
replay	Eastbourne Borough (6)	2–2 (3-5 p)	Leiston (7)	262
33	Poole Town (6)	1–1	Weymouth (7)	755
replay	Weymouth (7)	2–0	Poole Town (6)	441
34	Havant & Waterlooville (7)	1–3	Harlow Town (7)	197
35	Winchester City (8)	0–1	Dulwich Hamlet (7)	319
36	Maidenhead United (6)	2–2	Wealdstone (6)	555
replay	Wealdstone (6)	2–1	Maidenhead United (6)	254
37	Burgess Hill Town (7)	0–3	Hitchin Town (7)	243
38	Whitehawk (6)	1–1	St Albans City (6)	326
replay	St Albans City (6)	0–1	Whitehawk (6)	219
39	North Leigh (8)	1–0	Kingstonian (7)	203
40	Hythe Town (8)	4–2	Bishop's Stortford (6)	234

== First round proper ==
A total of 64 teams took part in this stage of the competition, all winners from the third round qualifying and the clubs from Level 5 of English football.

Tie	Home team (tier)	Score	Away team (tier)	Att.
1	Gateshead (5)	2–0	King's Lynn Town (7)	227
2	Farsley Celtic (8)	0–4	Southport (5)	352
3	Solihull Moors (5)	1–2	Matlock Town (7)	336
4	Nantwich Town (7)	1–2	Lincoln City (5)	482
5	Alfreton Town (6)	1–0	North Ferriby United (5)	290
6	Kidderminster Harriers (6)	4–0	AFC Telford United (6)	1,096
7	Nuneaton Town (6)	3–1	Stocksbridge Park Steels (8)	356
8	Harrogate Town (6)	3–3	Barrow (5)	441
replay	Barrow (5)	4–2 (a.e.t.)	Harrogate Town (6)	819
9	AFC Fylde (6)	1–1	Brackley Town (6)	641
replay	Brackley Town (6)	4–0	AFC Fylde (6)	146
10	York City (5)	3–1	Worcester City (6)	1,033
11	Chorley (6)	0–1	Guiseley (5)	612
12	Witton Albion (8)	1–1	Chester (5)	883
replay	Chester (5)	2–1	Witton Albion (8)	921
13	Wrexham (5)	0–1	Tranmere Rovers (5)	2,159
14	Altrincham (6)	1–1	Macclesfield Town (5)	717
replay	Macclesfield Town (5)	2–1	Altrincham (6)	548
15	Stockport County (6)	3–2	Marine (7)	1,411
16	Ebbsfleet United (6)	1–1	Woking (5)	825
replay	Woking (5)	0–1	Ebbsfleet United (6)	613
17	Chelmsford City (6)	1–0	Hitchin Town (7)	469
18	Dagenham & Redbridge (5)	1–2	Worthing (7)	597

Tie	Home team (tier)	Score	Away team (tier)	Att.
19	Harlow Town (7)	2–0	Eastleigh (5)	482
20	Whitehawk (6)	2–2	Weymouth (7)	253
replay	Weymouth (7)	1–2	Whitehawk (6)	401
21	Braintree Town (5)	2–0	Torquay United (5)	301
22	East Thurrock United (6)	1–1	Aldershot Town (5)	321
replay	Aldershot Town (5)	3–4 (a.e.t.)	East Thurrock United (6)	566
23	Dulwich Hamlet (7)	2–2	Royston Town (8)	701
replay	Royston Town (8)	0–1	Dulwich Hamlet (7)	312
24	Welling United (6)	8–1	Hythe Town (8)	355
25	Wealdstone (6)	2–2	Wingate & Finchley (7)	364
replay	Wingate & Finchley (7)	1–2 (a.e.t.)	Wealdstone (6)	280
26	Dartford (6)	1–1	Dover Athletic (5)	813
replay	Dover Athletic (5)	1–2	Dartford (6)	389
27	South Park (8)	1–1	North Leigh (8)	148
replay	North Leigh (8)	1–3	South Park (8)	157
28	AFC Sudbury (7)	2–1	Gosport Borough (6)	641
29	Sutton United (5)	1–0	Bath City (6)	524
30	Forest Green Rovers (5)	1–1	Truro City (6)	626
replay	Truro City (6)	0–1 (a.e.t.)	Forest Green Rovers (5)	336
31	Boreham Wood (5)	0–0	Maidstone United (5)	201
replay	Maidstone United (5)	2–3	Boreham Wood (5)	538
32	Bromley (5)	1–1	Leiston (7)	411
replay	Leiston (7)	3–5	Bromley (5)	306

== Second round proper ==
Tie	Home team (tier)	Score	Away team (tier)	Att.
1	Worthing (7)	2–2	Sutton United (5)	1,398
replay	Sutton United (5)	3–2 (a.e.t.)	Worthing (7)	496
2	Tranmere Rovers (5)	4–1	South Park (8)	2,801
3	Bromley (5)	1–2	Welling United (6)	519
4	East Thurrock United (6)	2–5	Braintree Town (5)	313
5	Nuneaton Town (6)	6–1	Guiseley (5)	554
6	Boreham Wood (5)	2–1	Alfreton Town (6)	201
7	Barrow (5)	3–2	Matlock Town (7)	976
8	Southport (5)	1–2	Wealdstone (6)	744

Tie	Home team (tier)	Score	Away team (tier)	Att.
9	Gateshead (5)	1–3	Lincoln City (5)	578
10	Dartford (6)	0–1	Chelmsford City (6)	918
11	Kidderminster Harriers (6)	3–0	Ebbsfleet United (6)	1,078
12	Harlow Town (7)	1–2	York City (5)	816
13	AFC Sudbury (7)	1–3	Macclesfield Town (5)	505
14	Whitehawk (6)	1–4	Dulwich Hamlet (7)	530
15	Chester (5)	0–2	Forest Green Rovers (5)	1,250
16	Stockport County (6)	1–1	Brackley Town (6)	1,605
replay	Brackley Town (6)	2–0	Stockport County (6)	294

== Third round proper ==
Tie	Home team (tier)	Score	Away team (tier)	Att.
1	Welling United (6)	1–3	Lincoln City (5)	743
2	Braintree Town (5)	0–0	Dulwich Hamlet (7)	608
replay	Dulwich Hamlet (7)	5–2	Braintree Town (5)	860
3	Barrow (5)	1–0	Kidderminster Harriers (6)	1,173
4	Tranmere Rovers (5)	1–1	Chelmsford City (6)	2,473
replay	Chelmsford City (6)	1–4	Tranmere Rovers (5)	923

Tie	Home team (tier)	Score	Away team (tier)	Att.
5	Macclesfield Town (5)	1–0	Forest Green Rovers (5)	967
6	Wealdstone (6)	1–4	Brackley Town (6)	620
7	Nuneaton Town (6)	0–3	York City (5)	687
8	Sutton United (5)	0–0	Boreham Wood (5)	879
replay	Boreham Wood (5)	5–0	Sutton United (5)	269

== Fourth round proper ==
Tie	Home team (tier)	Score	Away team (tier)	Att.
1	Dulwich Hamlet (7)	2–2	Macclesfield Town (5)	2,834
replay	Macclesfield Town (5)	2–0	Dulwich Hamlet (7)	1,017
2	York City (5)	1–0	Brackley Town (6)	1,994

Tie	Home team (tier)	Score	Away team (tier)	Att.
3	Boreham Wood (5)	0–2	Lincoln City (5)	901
4	Tranmere Rovers (5)	5–1	Barrow (5)	3,487

== Semi-finals ==
Semi final fixtures were played on 11 March and 18 March 2017, with the second leg going to extra time and penalties if required.

=== First leg ===
11 March 2017

Macclesfield Town (5)	1–1	Tranmere Rovers (5)
Norburn 54'		Hughes 2' (pen.)

Moss Rose, Macclesfield
Attendance: 2,358

14 March 2017

York City (5)	2–1	Lincoln City (5)
Oliver 53'; Connolly 69'		Angol 14' (pen.)

Bootham Crescent, York
Attendance: 3,294

=== Second leg ===
18 March 2017

Tranmere Rovers (5)	0–1	Macclesfield Town (5)
		Norburn 68'

Prenton Park, Birkenhead
Attendance: 6,100

18 March 2017

Lincoln City (5)	1–1	York City (5)
Raggett 66'		Fenwick 105+1'

Sincil Bank, Lincoln
Attendance: 8,409

== Final ==
21 May 2017
16:15 BST

Macclesfield Town	2–3	York City
R. Browne 13'; O. Norburn 45+1'		J. Parkin 8'; V. Oliver 22'; A. Connolly 86'

Wembley Stadium, London
Attendance: 38,224
Referee: Paul Tierney (Lancashire)
