= Nostell Miners Welfare F.C. =

Association football club in England

Coordinates: 53°39′06.41″N 1°24′39.60″W

Nostell Miners Welfare FC
- Full name: Nostell Miners Welfare Football Club
- Nickname: The Welfare
- Founded: 1928
- Ground: Crofton Community Centre; Crofton, West Yorkshire
- Capacity: 1,000; 100 seats 100 covered standing
- Chairman: Scott Atkinson
- Manager: Mat Wright
- League: Sheffield & Hallamshire County Senior League Premier Division
- 2025–26: Northern Counties East League Division One, 21st of 22 (relegated)
Home colours	Away colours

Nostell Miners Welfare Football Club is an English football club based in New Crofton, West Yorkshire. The club are currently members of the Sheffield & Hallamshire County Senior League Premier Division, Yorkshire Amateur League (YAL) and Wakefield District Sunday League, with the Junior Section being members of Huddersfield and District Junior League.

== History ==
Prior to the current club, a team under the name of Nostell Colliery Football Club played in the village during the 1890s and early 1900s; the team won the Wakefield and District League during this period.

The current club Nostell Miners Welfare Football Club was founded in 1928, after the purchasing of a plot of land to play on for £400, the location which they remain at today. The club won the Wakefield and District League during the 1937–1938 season.

Play was halted for World War II, but when the club returned they were successful in several colliery football competitions. In the late 1950s, the club toured Belgium and won a trophy on their tour. In the late 1960s, Nostell Miners Welfare continued their success in the Wakefield area eventually been brought up to the West Yorkshire League. The 1966–67 season was a successful one for the club, as they won the West Yorkshire League and cup double.

By the early 1970s, they were once again playing in the Wakefield and District League. After a period of rebuilding of their squad, the club managed to regain the success of previous years and were promoted to the West Yorkshire League in 1982.

The club worked their way up to the West Yorkshire League Premier Division to begin a successful period in their history. Alan Colquhoun took over as manager in the late 1990s, helping the club gradually improve in the league, becoming champions in 2004–05. They also appeared in the cup finals three consecutive times.

They finished well during the 2005–06 season, and, as champions Leeds Metropolitan Carnegie were not eligible for promotion, Nostell Miners Welfare along with A.F.C. Emley were promoted to the Northern Counties East Football League Division One and won promotion to the Premier Division the following season. This is the highest the club has ever been in their history.

On 28 April 2009, Nostell won the Northern Counties East Football League Presidents Cup final against Scarborough Athletic, away at Bridlington, winning 3–2 on aggregate.

In October 2016 Nostell appointed Chris Ellerby as Manager who was previously with Halifax Irish FC in the West Riding County Amateur League. Ellerby has made a host of signings bringing players such as Jonathan Irving, Antony Brown, Matthew Thompson, Billy Grogan, Leon Hurles-Brook and Tim Wallace.

At the end for the 2025-26 season Nostell finished 21st in the table and were relegated from Northern Counties East Division 1.

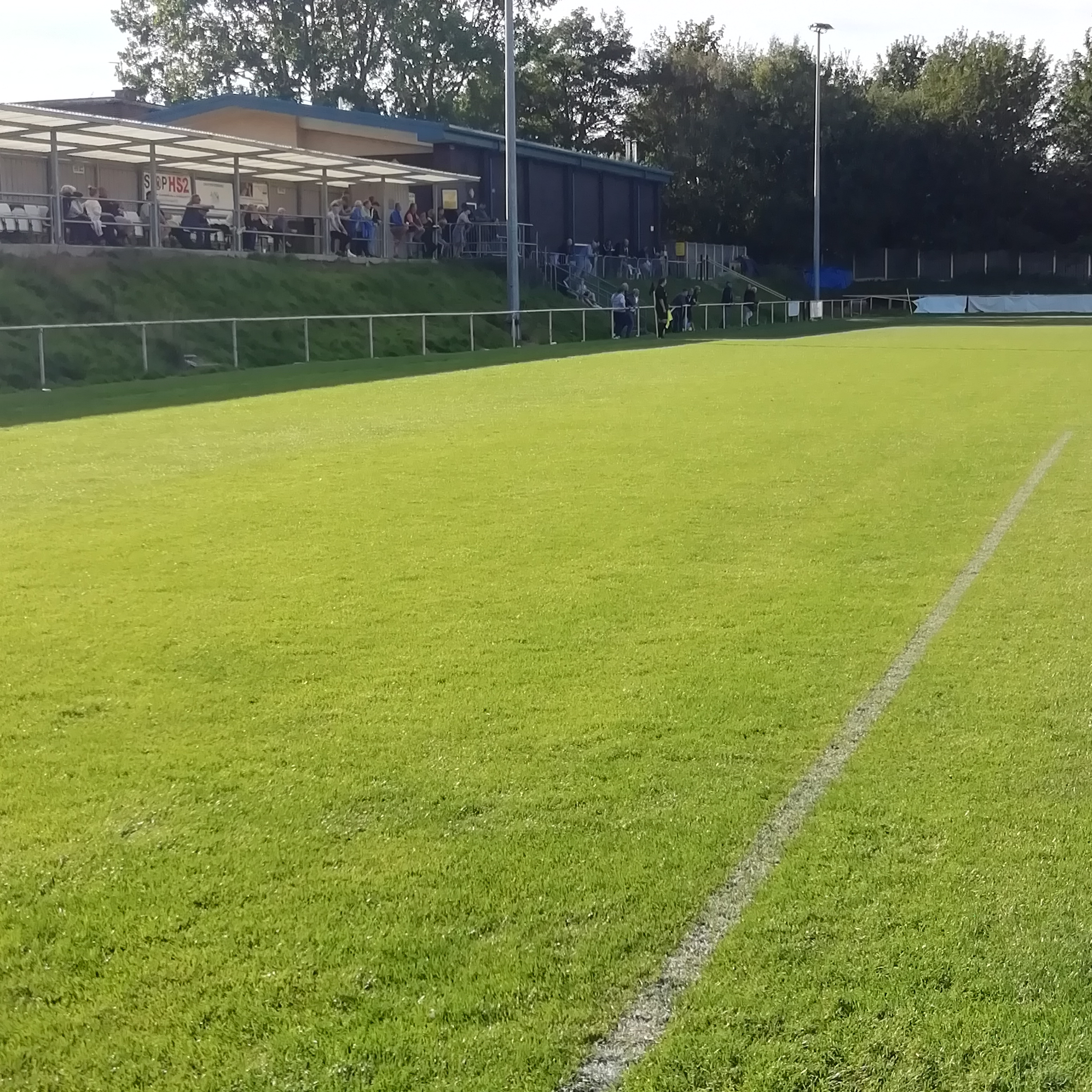

=== Season-by-season record ===
Season	Division	Level	Position	FA Cup	FA Vase	Notes
1997–98	West Yorkshire League Premier Division	-	11th/16	-	-	
1998–99	West Yorkshire League Premier Division	-	14th/15	-	-	
1999–00	West Yorkshire League Premier Division	-	3rd/15	-	-	
2000–01	West Yorkshire League Premier Division	-	7th/16	-	-	
2001–02	West Yorkshire League Premier Division	-	8th/16	-	-	
2002–03	West Yorkshire League Premier Division	-	3rd/15	-	-	
2003–04	West Yorkshire League Premier Division	-	5th/14	-	-	
2004–05	West Yorkshire League Premier Division	-	1st/16	-	-	League champions
2005–06	West Yorkshire League Premier Division	-	3rd/16	-	-	Promoted
2006–07	Northern Counties East League Division One	10	4th/17	-	-	Promoted
2007–08	Northern Counties East League Premier Division	9	5th/20	-	2QR	
2008–09	Northern Counties East League Premier Division	9	13th/20	PR	3R	
2009–10	Northern Counties East League Premier Division	9	18th/20	PR	2QR	
2010–11	Northern Counties East League Premier Division	9	9th/20	EPR	1QR	
2011–12	Northern Counties East League Premier Division	9	17th/20	EPR	2QR	
2012–13	Northern Counties East League Premier Division	9	17th/22	EPR	1R	
2013–14	Northern Counties East League Premier Division	9	21st/23	EPR	1QR	
2014–15	Northern Counties East League Premier Division	9	15th/21	EPR	2QR	
2015–16	Northern Counties East League Premier Division	9	22nd/22	EPR	1QR	Relegated
2016–17	Northern Counties East League Division One	10	22nd/22	EPR	2QR	
2017–18	Northern Counties East League Division One	10	17th/22	-	2QR	
2018–19	Northern Counties East League Division One	10	5th/20	-	1QR	
2019–20	Northern Counties East League Division One	10	–	EPR	2QR	League season abandoned due to COVID-19 pandemic
2020–21	Northern Counties East League Division One	10	–	–	2QR	League season abandoned due to COVID-19 pandemic
2021–22	Northern Counties East League Division One	10	14/21	–	1QR	
2022–23	Northern Counties East League Division One	10	12/20	–	1QR	
2023–24	Northern Counties East League Division One	10	17/23	–	1QR	
2024–25	Northern Counties East League Division One	10	19/22	–	1QR	
2025–26	Northern Counties East League Division One	10	21/22	–	1QR	Relegated
Season	Division	Level	Position	FA Cup	FA Vase	Notes
Source: Football Club History Database

== Honours ==
- West Yorkshire League Premier Division
  - Champions: 2004–05
- NCEL Presidents Cup
  - Winners: 2008–09

== Club records ==
- Highest attendance — 424 v. Wakefield AFC, NCEL Division one, 28 January 2025
