= Hemsworth Miners Welfare F.C. =

Association football club in England

Coordinates: 53°38′09.34″N 1°22′31.26″W

Hemsworth Miners Welfare
- Full name: Hemsworth Miners Welfare Football Club
- Nickname: The Wells
- Founded: 1981
- Ground: Just Football MDC Stadium; Fitzwilliam
- Capacity: 2,000 (100 seated)
- League: Sheffield & Hallamshire County Senior League Premier Division
- 2024–25: Sheffield & Hallamshire County Senior League Premier Division, 2nd of 14
Home colours	Away colours

Hemsworth Miners Welfare Football Club is a football club based in Hemsworth, West Yorkshire, England. They are currently members of the Sheffield & Hallamshire County Senior League Premier Division and play at the Just Football MDC Stadium in Fitzwilliam.

== History ==
The club was established in 1981 after Hemsworth Colliery folded the year before. The new club joined Division Three of the Doncaster & District Senior League. A third-place finish in 1985–86 saw the club promoted to Division Two, and another third-place finish the following season resulted in a second successive promotion to Division One. In 1987–88 they were Division One runners-up, securing a third straight promotion and entry to the Premier Division.

Hemsworth won the Premier Division Cup in 1994–95, after which they joined the West Riding County League. In 1996–97 they won the Division title and the Division One Cup and were promoted to the Premier Division. The following year they won the Premier Division Cup, a feat repeated in 2001–02. In 2007–08 a fourth-place finish in the Premier Division was enough to earn promotion to Division One of the Northern Counties East League. They were Division One champions in 2015–16, earning promotion to the Premier Division. At the end of the 2022–23 season the club were demoted to the Premier Division of the Sheffield & Hallamshire County Senior League after failing ground grading requirements. In their first season in the league, they won the League Cup final, beating Dodworth Miners Welfare 5–3 on penalties after a 2–2 draw.

In 2025–26 Hemsworth were champions of the Sheffield & Hallamshire League Premier Division, securing promotion to Division One of the Northern Counties East League.

=== Season-by-season record ===
Season	Division	Level	Position	FA Cup	FA Vase	Notes
1981–82	Bentley League	–		–	–	
1982–83	Doncaster & District Senior League Division Three	–	14/15	–	–	
1983–84	Doncaster & District Senior League Division Three	–		–	–	
1984–85	Doncaster & District Senior League Division Three	–	9/14	–	–	
1985–86	Doncaster & District Senior League Division Three	–	3/12	–	–	Promoted
1986–87	Doncaster & District Senior League Division Two	–	3/10	–	–	Promoted
1987–88	Doncaster & District Senior League Division One	–	2/12	–	–	Promoted
1988–89	Doncaster & District Senior League Premier Division	–	3/13	–	–	
1989–90	Doncaster & District Senior League Premier Division	–	5/13	–	–	
1990–91	Doncaster & District Senior League Premier Division	–	6/14	–	–	
1991–92	Doncaster & District Senior League Premier Division	–	4/13	–	–	
1992–93	Doncaster & District Senior League Premier Division	–	4/15	–	–	
1993–94	Doncaster & District Senior League Premier Division	–	2/14	–	–	
1994–95	Doncaster & District Senior League Premier Division	–	3/11	–	–	
1995–96	West Riding County League Division One	–	3/16	–	–	
1996–97	West Riding County League Division One	–	1/16	–	–	Promoted
1997–98	West Riding County League Premier Division	–	4/14	–	–	
1998–99	West Riding County League Premier Division	–	2/14	–	–	
1999–2000	West Riding County League Premier Division	–	2/14	–	–	
2000–01	West Riding County League Premier Division	10	4/14	–	–	
2001–02	West Riding County League Premier Division	10	5/14	–	–	
2002–03	West Riding County League Premier Division	10	5/13	–	–	
2003–04	West Riding County League Premier Division	10	6/14	–	–	
2004–05	West Riding County League Premier Division	11	8/14	–	–	
2005–06	West Riding County League Premier Division	11	11/14	–	–	
2006–07	West Riding County League Premier Division	11	8/14	–	–	
2007–08	West Riding County League Premier Division	11	4/14	–	–	Promoted
2008–09	Northern Counties East League Division One	10	10/19	–	–	
2009–10	Northern Counties East League Division One	10	7/18	–	1R	
2010–11	Northern Counties East League Division One	10	16/20	PR	1QR	
2011–12	Northern Counties East League Division One	10	8/20	EPR	2QR	
2012–13	Northern Counties East League Division One	10	13/22	PR	1QR	
2013–14	Northern Counties East League Division One	10	17/22	–	2QR	
2014–15	Northern Counties East League Division One	10	3/22	–	2QR	
2015–16	Northern Counties East League Division One	10	1/21	EPR	2R	Promoted
2016–17	Northern Counties East League Premier Division	9	9/22	PR	2R	
2017–18	Northern Counties East League Premier Division	9	6/22	EPR	2QR	
2018–19	Northern Counties East League Premier Division	9	4/20	EPR	2R	
2019–20	Northern Counties East League Premier Division	9	–	PR	1R	League season abandoned owing to COVID-19 pandemic
2020–21	Northern Counties East League Premier Division	9	–	EP	1R	League season abandoned owing to COVID-19 pandemic
2021–22	Northern Counties East League Premier Division	9	18/20	EPR	1QR	
2022–23	Northern Counties East League Premier Division	9	8/20			Demoted
2023–24	Sheffield & Hallamshire County Senior League Premier Division	11	8/14			
2024–25	Sheffield & Hallamshire County Senior League Premier Division	11	2/14			
2025–26	Sheffield & Hallamshire County Senior League Premier Division	11	1/14			Promoted (champions)
Source: Non-League Matters, FCHD

== Honours ==
- Northern Counties East League
  - Division One champions 2015–16
- Sheffield & Hallamshire County Senior League
  - Premier Division champions 2025–26
  - League Cup winners 2023–24
- West Riding County Amateur League
  - Division One champions 1996–97
  - Premier Division Cup winners 1997–98, 2001–02
  - Division One Cup winners 1996–97
- Doncaster Senior League
  - Premier Division Cup winners 1994–95
- Doncaster FA Challenge Cup
  - Winners 1995–96
- Sheffield Junior Cup
  - Winners 1997–98

== Records ==
- Best FA Cup performance: Preliminary round, 2010–11, 2012–13, 2016–17
- Best FA Vase performance: Second round, 2015–16, 2016–17
- Record attendance: 505 vs Kinsley Boys, 2007
- Biggest win: 19–0 v Highfields
- Heaviest defeat: 1–10 v Blue Bell
- Most appearances: Stuart Clark, 811
- Most goals: Stuart Clark, 377
- Most goals in a season: Paul Crapper, 52
- Most goals in a game: Damien Liddle, 10
