= 2012–13 East Midlands Counties Football League =

The 2012–13 East Midlands Counties Football League season was the 5th in the history of East Midlands Counties Football League, a football competition in England.

== League ==
East Midlands Counties Football League
- Season: 2012–13
- Champions: Basford United
- Promoted: Basford United
- Matches: 342
- Goals: 1,300 (3.8 per match)

The league featured 16 clubs from the previous season, along with three new clubs:

- Aylestone Park, promoted from the Leicestershire Senior League
- Basford United, promoted from the Central Midlands Football League
- Lutterworth Athletic, promoted from the Leicestershire Senior League

=== League table ===
Pos	Team	Pld	W	D	L	GF	GA	GD	Pts	Promotion or relegation
1	Basford United	36	31	2	3	97	29	+68	95	Promoted to the Northern Counties East League
2	Barrow Town	36	27	3	6	95	31	+64	84	
3	Thurnby Nirvana	36	25	3	8	94	35	+59	78	
4	Borrowash Victoria	36	21	5	10	92	50	+42	68	
5	Holwell Sports	36	20	4	12	81	55	+26	64	
6	Blaby & Whetstone Athletic	36	19	5	12	73	47	+26	62	
7	Aylestone Park	36	19	4	13	71	52	+19	58 (Note: Aylestone Park and Graham Street Prims were deducted 3 points.)	
8	Graham Street Prims	36	18	6	12	68	62	+6	57	
9	Holbrook Sports	36	16	5	15	68	66	+2	53	
10	Radcliffe Olympic	36	14	3	19	68	78	−10	45	
11	Bardon Hill	36	12	8	16	65	67	−2	44	
12	Lutterworth Athletic	36	10	7	19	60	71	−11	37	Transferred to the United Counties League
13	Gedling Miners Welfare	36	9	8	19	58	96	−38	35	
14	Anstey Nomads	36	9	7	20	41	92	−51	34	
15	Ellistown	36	8	9	19	56	101	−45	33	Merged into Ellistown & Ibstock United
16	St Andrews	36	9	5	22	56	95	−39	32	
17	Ibstock United	36	9	5	22	53	96	−43	32	Merged into Ellistown & Ibstock United
18	Greenwood Meadows	36	7	9	20	56	85	−29	30	
19	Radford	36	8	4	24	48	92	−44	28	

Source: fchd
Rules for classification: 1) points; 2) goal difference; 3) number of goals scored.
