= Jonathan Wafula =

Kenyan footballer (born 1994)

Personal information
- Full name: Jonathan Walukana Wafula
- Date of birth: 17 June 1994 (age 32)
- Place of birth: Kenya
- Height: 1.78 m (5 ft 10 in)
- Position: Forward

Team information
- Current team: Grantham Town

Senior career*
Years	Team	Apps	(Gls)
2012–2013	Chesterfield	1	(0)
2014–	Worksop Town		
2015–2017	Shaw Lane		
2017–2018	Gainsborough Trinity	13	(1)
2018–2020	Boston United	45	(4)
2020–2021	Guiseley	12	(1)
2021	Matlock Town	5	(0)
2021–	Grantham Town	26	(4)
- * Club domestic league appearances and goals as of 22:10, 27 April 2022 (UTC)

Jonathan Walukana Wafula (born 17 June 1994) is a Kenyan footballer who plays as a forward for Northern Premier League side Matlock Town

== Early life ==
Wafula was born in Kenya and at aged 10 moved to England. His family settled in Matlock, Derbyshire and then in Alfreton. When he first moved to England, he had no real interest in football and only started playing the game when he left school and attended college.

== Career ==
Wafula began his career with Chesterfield and made his professional debut on 12 January 2013 in a 3–0 victory against Northampton Town.

In 2014, he signed for Worksop Town.

He then signed for Shaw Lane.

In May 2017 he signed for Gainsborough Trinity.

In February 2018, Wafula signed for National League North club Boston United.

On 10 August 2020, Wafula signed for fellow National League North side Guiseley.

He signed for Northern Premier League Premier Division side Matlock Town on a free transfer in July 2021.

On 14 September 2021, Wafula signed for Grantham Town.
