= West Riding County Amateur Football League =

- Founded: 1922
- Folded: 2019
- Country: England
- Divisions: Premier Division
- Number of clubs: 11
- Level on pyramid: Level 11 (Premier Division)
- Feeder to: Northern Counties East League Division One
- Relegation to: Craven and District; Halifax and District; Huddersfield and District; Spen Valley and District; Wakefield and District
- Domestic cup(s): Premier Division Cup
- Last champions: Golcar United (Premier Division) (2018–19)

The West Riding County Amateur Football League was a football competition based in Yorkshire, England. Formed in 1922, it had one division when it closed in 2019 due to a lack of participating clubs.

The Premier Division sat at level 11 of the English football league system. Silsden, Brighouse Town, Hemsworth Miners Welfare, Campion and Steeton were the most recent teams to move up from the league. Silsden were promoted in 2004 after winning the Premier Division in successive seasons but chose to play their football in the North West Counties League, as did neighbouring Steeton in 2018, whereas Brighouse Town, Hemsworth Miners Welfare and Campion went up to the Northern Counties East League.

The league operated with only one division until the 1953–54 season, then gradually expanded to reach five divisions for a while.

== Final member clubs ==
The last constitution for the 2018–19 season was as follows. Clubs which are struck through withdrew before the end of the season.

=== Premier Division ===
- ~~AFC Bingley~~
- ~~Bradford Olympic~~
- ~~DRAM Community~~
- Golcar United
- Lepton Highlanders
- Littletown
- Lower Hopton
- Ovenden West Riding
- P.F.C. (ex West Horton)
- Route One Rovers
- Ryburn United
- Steeton Reserves
- Toller AFC
- TVR United
- ~~Wakefield City~~

== Recent divisional champions ==
Season	Premier Division	Division One	Division Two	Division Three
1986–87	Ovenden West Riding	Halifax Irish	V.A.W. Low Moor	Collingham Reserves
1987–88	Ovenden West Riding	V.A.W. Low Moor	Colton	Bradley Rangers Reserves
1988–89	V.A.W. Low Moor	Altofts	Steeton	Gatehouse
1989–90	V.A.W. Low Moor	Ferrybridge Amateurs	Campion Tyke	Tyersal
1990–91	Brighouse Town	Aberford Albion	Tyersal	Ferrybridge Amateurs Reserves
1991–92	Field	Tyersal	Otley Town	Field Reserves
1992–93	Aberford Albion	Campion	Brighouse Town Reserves	Phoenix
1993–94	Marsden	Otley Town	Phoenix	Heckmondwike Town
1994–95	Brighouse Town	Farnley W.M.C.	Greetland	Holmewood Athletic
1995–96	Brighouse Town	Storthes Hall	Overthorpe S.C.	Keighley Shamrocks
1996–97	Ovenden West Riding	Hemsworth Miners Welfare	Bay Athletic	Field Reserves
1997–98	Marsden	Phoenix	Hall Green United	Phoenix Reserves
1998–99	Storthes Hall	Bay Athletic	Lower Hopton	Trinity Athletic
1999–2000	Keighley Phoenix	Stump Cross	Silsden	Campion Reserves
2000–01	Brighouse Town	Silsden	Steeton	
2001–02	Brighouse Town	Tyersal	Wakefield City	
2002–03	Silsden	Hall Green United	Salts	
2003–04	Silsden	Ardsley Celtic	Halifax Irish Club	
2004–05	Golcar United	Eastmoor	South Bradford	
2005–06	Bay Athletic	Hall Green United	Meltham Athletic	
2006–07	Wibsey	Meltham Athletic	Bronte Wanderers	
2007–08	Bay Athletic	Kirkburton	Brighouse Town Reserves	
2008–09	Bay Athletic	Tyersal	Bronte Wanderers	
2009–10	Bay Athletic	Steeton	Bay Athletic Reserves	Huddersfield Y.M.C.A.
2010–11	Bay Athletic	Littletown	Lepton Highlanders	Albion Sports Reserves
2011–12	Ovenden West Riding	Lepton Highlanders	Campion Reserves	Littletown Reserves
2012–13	Bay Athletic	Huddersfield Y.M.C.A.	Bay Athletic Reserves	
2013–14	Ovenden West Riding	Hunsworth	Dudley Hill Rangers	
2014–15	Bay Athletic	Wakefield City	Honley	
2015–16	Huddersfield Y.M.C.A.	Newsome	Thornton United	
2016–17	Lower Hopton	Thornton United	T V R United	
2017–18	Golcar United	Ovenden West Riding		
2018–19	Golcar United			

== Recent divisional cup winners ==
Season	Premier Division Cup	Division One Cup	Division Two Cup	Division Three Cup
2009–10	Albion Sports	Ventus/Yeadon Celtic	AFC Emley Reserves	Huddersfield Y.M.C.A.
2010–11	Tyersal	Bay Athletic Reserves	Long Lee	Albion Sports Reserves
2011–12	Ovenden West Riding	Lepton Highlanders	Ovenden West Riding Reserves	
2012–13	Ovenden West Riding	Halifax Irish Club	Ovenden West Riding Reserves	
2013–14	Ovenden West Riding	Wakefield City	Golcar United Reserves	
2014–15	Ovenden West Riding	Lepton Highlanders	Bay Athletic Reserves	
2015–16	Huddersfield Y.M.C.A.	Newsome	Salts Reserves	
2016–17	Littletown	Route One Rovers	Lower Hopton Reserves	
2017–18	Steeton	West Horton		
2018–19	Route One Rovers			
