= Shaw Lane A.F.C. =

Shaw Lane
- Full name: Shaw Lane Association Football Club
- Nickname(s): The Ducks
- Founded: 1991
- Dissolved: 2018
- Ground: Shaw Lane, Barnsley (2012–2017); Sheerien Park, Barnsley (2017–2018)
Home colours

Shaw Lane Association Football Club was a football club based in Barnsley, South Yorkshire. They played in the Northern Premier League Premier Division, at level 7 of the English football league system.

== History ==
Although formed in 2012, the club traces its history to 1991. That year, an U11 team was formed at the Shaw Lane sports complex in Barnsley. The next decade saw the club gradually expand and in 2004 they became part of the Shaw Lane Community Sports Association. The senior team merged with Worsbrough Common F.C. in 2011 to form Aquaforce Barnsley F.C., taking Worsbrough's Sheffield & Hallamshire County Senior League Division One place and winning promotion to the Premier Division in 2012. Aquaforce Barnsley then merged with Barugh F.C., another ailing local team, to form Shaw Lane Aquaforce.

In their first season, the club won the Sheffield and Hallamshire County Senior League Premier Division, winning promotion to the Northern Counties East League (NCEL) Division One. A year later, their rise continued when they finished runners-up in the NCEL Division One, winning promotion to the Premier Division. This was followed by the club winning the Premier Division in the 2014–15 season and gaining promotion to the Northern Premier League (NPL) Division One South.

The club's first season in the NPL ended with a second-place finish, with the team missing out on promotion after losing in the end of season play-offs. In the middle of 2016, the club was renamed as simply Shaw Lane in order to comply with FA regulations which prohibit the use of sponsored names above a certain level. They went on to win the 2016/17 Division One South championship to clinch their fifth promotion in seven years, and completed a league and cup double by beating Frickley Athletic in the final of the Sheffield & Hallamshire Senior Cup to win competition for the first time.

In the 2017–18 season, they reached their 1st FA Cup proper with a 2–1 win over Barrow and lost 1–3 to Mansfield Town.

On 8 June 2018 the club's first team withdrew from football.

=== Season-by-season record ===
Promoted

Season	Division	Level	Position	FA Cup	FA Trophy	FA Vase
Formed as Shaw Lane Aquaforce (2012)
2012–13	Sheffield & Hallamshire County Senior League Premier Division	11	1st/15	-	-	-
2013–14	Northern Counties East League Division 1	10	2nd/22	-	-	-
2014–15	Northern Counties East League Premier Division	9	1st/21	-	-	QF
2015–16	Northern Premier League Division 1 South	8	2nd/22 (Note: League play-off semi-finalists)	PR	2QR	-
Changed name to Shaw Lane (2016)
2016–17	Northern Premier League Division 1 South	8	1st/22	PR	3QR	-
2017–18	Northern Premier League Premier Division	7	6th/24	R1	1QR	-
Source: Football Club History Database (1), Football Club History Database (2)

=== Notable former players ===
Players that have played in the Football League or at international level either before or after playing for Shaw Lane Aquaforce –

- (England) Luke O'Brien
- (Wales) Jason Price
- (England) Steven Istead
- (England) Matt Thornhill
- (England) Neil Austin
- (England) James Cotterill
- (England) Michael Potts
- (England) Rhys Meynell
- (Kenya) Jonathan Wafula
- (England) Jack Tuohy
- (England) David Norris
- (Nigeria) Godwin Abadaki
- (England) Jon Stewart
- (England) Aidan Chippendale
- (Nigeria) Chib Chilaka
- (England) Matty Templeton
- (England) Gavin Rothery
- (England) Nicky Walker
- (England) Billy Whitehouse
- (England) Paul Ennis
- (Gibraltar) Adam Priestley
- (England) Sam Osborne

== Honours ==
=== League ===
- Northern Premier League Division One South
  - Champions: 2016-17
- Northern Counties East League Premier Division
  - Champions: 2014–15
- Northern Counties East League Division One
  - Promoted: 2013–14
- Sheffield & Hallamshire County Senior League Premier Division
  - Champions: 2012–13

=== Cup ===
- Sheffield & Hallamshire Senior Cup
  - Winners 2016/17, 2017/18

== Records ==
- Best League performance: 6th in Northern Premier League Premier Division, 2017–18
- Best FA Cup performance: First round, 2017–18
- Best FA Trophy performance: Third round qualifying, 2016–17
- Best FA Vase performance: Quarter-final, 2014–15
- Record attendance : 1,576 vs. Mansfield Town 2017–18
