= Joe Marsh (footballer) =

English footballer

Personal information
- Place of birth: Hemsworth, England
- Height: 5 ft 7 1/2 in (1.71 m)
- Position: Forward

Senior career*
Years	Team	Apps	(Gls)
- Hemsworth Colliery
- Brierley
- South Kirkby Colliery
1919–1922	Bradford City	24	(4)
- Castleford Town
- * Club domestic league appearances and goals

Joseph Marsh was an English professional footballer who played as a forward.

== Career ==
Born in Hemsworth, Marsh spent his early career with Hemsworth Colliery, Brierley and South Kirkby Colliery. He joined Bradford City from South Kirkby Colliery in November 1919. He made 24 league appearances for the club, scoring 4 goals; he also scored once in 3 FA Cup matches. He left the club in August 1922 to join Castleford Town.

== Sources ==
- Frost, Terry (1988). Bradford City A Complete Record 1903-1988. Breedon Books Sport. ISBN 0-907969-38-0.
