= Hemsworth Colliery F.C. =

Association football club in England

Hemsworth Colliery
- Full name: Hemsworth Colliery Football Club
- Founded: 1925; 101 years ago as Hemsworth Association Football Club
- Dissolved: 1980
- Ground: Kinsley Recreation Ground, Kinsley, West Yorkshire

Hemsworth Colliery Football Club were a football club based in Hemsworth, West Yorkshire, England. The team played in the Sheffield and District Football League and Alliance.

== History ==
By the 1920s Hemsworth West End had risen to prominence as the senior football club in the town, reaching the FA Cup fourth qualifying round in the 1925–26 season. Yet in 1926, whilst the West End club were at their peak, a new colliery club was established. Hemsworth Main Colliery Club were formed in the 1925–26 season and in January 1926 the club agreed to step into the position of Harwood Main, who had withdrawn from the Doncaster Senior League.

In 1981, following the folding of the then existing colliery club in 1980, a new club known as Hemsworth Miners Welfare were formed.
