= Brighouse Town F.C. =

Association football club

Coordinates: 53°43′10.891″N 1°48′0.691″W

Brighouse Town
- Full name: Brighouse Town Football Club
- Nickname: Town
- Founded: 1963
- Ground: St Giles Road, Brighouse
- Capacity: 1,000 (100 seated)
- Chairman: Mark Booth
- Manager: Luke Haigh
- League: West Yorkshire League Division One
- 2025–26: Northern Premier League Division One East, 22nd of 22 (relegated)
| Home colours | Away colours |

Brighouse Town Football Club is a football club based in Brighouse, West Yorkshire, England. They are currently members of the West Yorkshire League Division One and play at St Giles Road.

== History ==
The club was established in 1963 as the works team of the Blakeborough Valve Company. They joined the Huddersfield Works League in the same year, going on to win the league title in 1966–67, 1968–69, 1973–74 and 1974–75, as well as winning the League Cup and Halifax District Cup in 1968–69. In 1975 they moved up to the West Riding County Amateur League.

In 1988 the club adopted its current name after the company closed down. They won Division One in 1988–89 and went on to win the Premier Division in 1990–91 and the West Riding County Challenge Cup in 1991–92, before winning back-to-back Premier Division titles in 1994–95 and 1995–96, also winning the League Cup and Bob Wedgeworth Memorial Trophy in the latter season. They went on to win the Premier Division again in 2000–01 and 2001–02. Despite only finishing eighth in 2007–08, the club were promoted to Division One of the Northern Counties East League. After finishing as Division One runners-up in 2009–10, they were promoted to the Premier Division.

Brighouse won the Premier Division in 2013–14, earning promotion to Division One North of the Northern Premier League. Prior to the 2018–19 season the club were transferred to Division One East as part of league reorganisation. They went on to finish third, qualifying for the promotion play-offs. After defeating Sheffield 3–1 in the semi-finals, they beat Pontefract Collieries 3–0 in the final. However, with only five of the seven play-offs winners being promoted based on their points-per-game ranking over the season, Brighouse were one of the two clubs to miss out.

In 2025–26 Brighouse finished bottom of Division One East and were voluntarily relegated four levels to Division One of the West Yorkshire League.

== Ground ==
The club initially played at Woodhouse Recreation Ground, before moving to Green Lane in Hove Edge. When Green Lane was used for housing, the club moved to St Giles Road. The ground currently has a capacity of 1,000, of which 100 is seated and 200 covered.

== Non-playing staff ==
- Chairman: Mark Booth
- Vice Chairman: Charlie Tolley
- Secretary: Julian Prior
- Matchday Secretary: Darrell Hadala
- Manager: Luke Haigh
- Physio:
- Kitman: Will Armitage
- Media Manager: Oliver Eaton

== Honours ==
- Northern Counties East League
  - Premier Division champions 2013–14
- West Riding County Amateur League
  - Premier Division champions 1990–91, 1994–95, 1995–96, 2000–01, 2001–02
  - Division One champions 1988–89
  - Premier Cup winners 1993–94, 1995–96, 1998–99, 2000–01
  - Bob Wedgeworth Memorial Trophy winners 1995–96
- West Riding County Challenge Cup
  - Winners 1991–92
- Halifax FA Cup
  - Winners 1998–99, 2001–02, 2002–03
- Huddersfield Works League
  - Champions 1966–67, 1968–69, 1973–74, 1974–75
  - League Cup winners 1968–69

== Records ==
- Best FA Cup performance: Second qualifying round, 2013–14
- Best FA Trophy performance: First qualifying round, 2015–16, 2025–26
- Best FA Vase performance: Fourth round, 2012–13
- Record attendance: 1,059 vs Scarborough Athletic, Northern Counties East League Premier Division, 13 April 2013

== See also ==
- Brighouse Town F.C. players
