= Staveley Miners Welfare F.C. =

Association football club in England

Coordinates: 53°15′49.56″N 1°21′16.05″W

Staveley Miners Welfare
- Full name: Staveley Miners Welfare Football Club
- Nickname: The Trojans
- Founded: 1962
- Ground: Inkersall Road
- Capacity: 5,000 (220 seats)
- Chairman: Terry Damms
- Manager: Pat Lindley
- League: United Counties League Division One
- 2024–25: United Counties League Division One, 6th of 19
Home colours	Away colours

Staveley Miners Welfare Football Club is an English football club based in Staveley, Derbyshire. They play in the Northern Counties East Football League Division One, at level 10 (non-league step 6) of the English football league system with the reserve side playing at step 7 in the Central Midlands Alliance Premier Division North.

== History ==
The club was established as a Sunday league team in 1962, and initially played at Barrow Hill under the name Nags Head. They played friendly matches for three years, before joining the Mansfield League. In 1968 they joined the Chesterfield League. In 1989 the club started playing Saturday football in the Chesterfield and District Amateur League. In 1991 they moved up to the Sheffield and Hallamshire County Senior League, winning Division Three in their first season, and Division Two in their second.

In 1993 they joined the Supreme Division of the Central Midlands League. After finishing third in 1996–97 they were accepted into Division One of the Northern Counties East League.

The club finished second in their first season in Division One, and were promoted to the Premier Division. After three seasons of struggling, they were relegated back to Division One in 2000–01, having finished bottom of the table. They finished bottom of Division One in 2002–03, but avoided relegation. In 2010–11 the club won Division One to return to the Premier Division.

=== Season-by-season record ===
Season	Division	Level	Position	FA Cup	FA Vase	Notes
1991–92	Sheffield & Hallamshire County Senior League Division 3	-	1st/11	-	-	Promoted
1992–93	Sheffield & Hallamshire County Senior League Division 2	-	1st/15	-	-	Transferred
1993–94	Central Midlands League Supreme Division	-	4th/17	-	-	
1994–95	Central Midlands League Supreme Division	-	12th/17	-	Preliminary Round	
1995–96	Central Midlands League Supreme Division	-	5th/17	-	2nd Qualifying Round	
1996–97	Central Midlands League Supreme Division	-	3rd/16	-	1st Qualifying Round	Transferred
1997–98	Northern Counties East League Division 1	-	2nd/15	1st Qualifying Round	2nd round	Promoted
1998–99	Northern Counties East League Premier Division	-	17th/20	1st Qualifying Round	3rd round	
1999–00	Northern Counties East League Premier Division	-	19th/20	1st Qualifying Round	1st round	
2000–01	Northern Counties East League Premier Division	-	20th/20	Preliminary Round	2nd Qualifying Round	Relegated
2001–02	Northern Counties East League Division 1	-	15th/16	1st Qualifying Round	1st round	
2002–03	Northern Counties East League Division 1	10	17th/17	Preliminary Round	1st Qualifying Round	
2003–04	Northern Counties East League Division 1	10	16th/18	Preliminary Round	2nd Qualifying Round	
2004–05	Northern Counties East League Division 1	10	9th/16	Extra Preliminary Round	1st round	
2005–06	Northern Counties East League Division 1	10	10th/16	2nd Qualifying Round	2nd Qualifying Round	
2006–07	Northern Counties East League Division 1	10	6th/17	Extra Preliminary Round	1st Qualifying Round	
2007–08	Northern Counties East League Division 1	10	8th/17	Preliminary Round	2nd Qualifying Round	
2008–09	Northern Counties East League Division 1	10	4th/19	Preliminary Round	1st round	
2009–10	Northern Counties East League Division 1	10	4th/18	Preliminary Round	1st Qualifying Round	
2010–11	Northern Counties East League Division 1	10	1st/20	Preliminary Round	4th round	Promoted
2011–12	Northern Counties East League Premier Division	9	5th/20	2nd Qualifying Round	Semi-finals	
2012–13	Northern Counties East League Premier Division	9	13th/22	Preliminary Round	2nd round	
2013–14	Northern Counties East League Premier Division	9	17th/23	Preliminary Round	3rd round	
2014–15	Northern Counties East League Premier Division	9	9th/21	1st Qualifying Round	1st Qualifying Round	
2015–16	Northern Counties East League Premier Division	9	8th/22	Extra Preliminary Round	1st Qualifying Round	
2016–17	Northern Counties East League Premier Division	9	6th/22	Extra Preliminary Round	3rd Round	
2017–18	Northern Counties East League Premier Division	9	16th/22	Preliminary Round	1st Round	
2018–19	Northern Counties East League Premier Division	9	7th/20	2nd Qualifying Round	1st Round	
2019–20	Northern Counties East League Premier Division	9	1st/20	1st Qualifying Round	1st Round	
2020–21	Northern Counties East League Premier Division	9	17th/20	Extra Preliminary Round	1st Round	
2021–22	Northern Counties East League Premier Division	9	10th/20	Extra Preliminary Round	2nd round	Voluntary relegation
2022–23	Northern Counties East League Division 1	10	5th/20	-	1st Round	
Source: FCHD

== Honours ==
- Northern Counties East League
  - Division One champions 2010–11
  - League Trophy winners 1997–98, 2008–09, 2009–10
- Sheffield and Hallamshire County Senior League
  - Division Three champions 1991–92
  - Division Two champions 1992–93
- Chesterfield and District Amateur League
  - Byron Cup winners 1989–90

== Records ==
- FA Cup
  - Second Qualifying Round 2005–06, 2011–12, 2018–19
- FA Vase
  - Semi-finals 2011–12
