= 2012–13 FA Vase =

Football Association Vase

Tournament details
- Country: England; Wales

Final positions
- Champions: Spennymoor Town (1st title)
- Runners-up: Tunbridge Wells

The 2012–13 FA Vase was the 39th season of the FA Vase, an annual football competition for teams in the lower reaches of the English football league system.

Spennymoor Town won the competition, beating Tunbridge Wells in the final.

== Semi-finals ==
Leg no	Home team (tier)	Score	Away team (tier)	Att.
1st	Guernsey (9)	1–3	Spennymoor Town (9)	4,290
2nd	Spennymoor Town (9)	1–0	Guernsey (9)	1,643

Spennymoor Town won 4–1 on aggregate.

Leg no	Home team (tier)	Score	Away team (tier)	Att.
1st	Tunbridge Wells (9)	2–0	Shildon (9)	1,754
2nd	Shildon (9)	3–2	Tunbridge Wells (9)	901

Tunbridge Wells won 4–3 on aggregate.

== Final ==
4 May 2013
15:00 BST

Spennymoor Town	2–1	Tunbridge Wells
Gavin Cogdon 18'; Keith Graydon 81'	Report	Josh Stanford 78'

Wembley Stadium, London
Attendance: 16,751
Referee: Michael Naylor (Sheffield & Hallamshire FA)
