= Retford United F.C. =

Association football club in England

Coordinates: 53°19′28.020″N 0°55′05.189″W

Retford United
- Full name: Retford United Football Club
- Nickname: The Badgers
- Founded: 1987
- Ground: Cannon Park, Retford
- Capacity: 2,000 (300 covered)
- Chairman: Nik Springthorpe
- Manager: Vacant
- League: Northern Counties East League Premier Division
- 2025–26: United Counties League Division One, 2nd of 23 (promoted via play-offs)
- Website: www.retfordunitedfc.co.uk
Home colours	Away colours

Retford United Football Club (also known as 'The Badgers') are an English football club based at Cannon Park in Retford, Nottinghamshire. They currently play in the Northern Counties East League Premier Division.

== History ==
The club was founded in 1987 by Retfordian Brian Jackson to give the town a senior club after Retford Town had gone out of business. They were going to be called Welham Wanderers due to the location of the ground but settled on Retford United due to the proximity to the town. The club's inaugural season was in the Gainsborough & District League which was successful so it applied to join the Notts Football Alliance the following season and competed in that league up until 2001, when local business man Dean Vivians financial support, built the club house, ground, floodlights, everything necessary to rise up the football pyramid and they joined the Central Midlands League. Promotion after promotion followed and Just three years passed before another milestone was reached and the club joined the Northern Counties East League.

The success continued, finishing as runners-up in the Northern Counties East League Division One in 2005–06, gaining promotion to the Premier Division, which they won at their first attempt. They were then promoted to the Northern Premier League Division One South, which they won two years running, gaining promotion to the Premier Division in 2009. In all, between 2000 and 2009, they won a total of six championships, of various leagues and divisions, in nine seasons.

However, at the end of the 2010–11 season they finished bottom and were relegated to the Northern Premier League Division One South. Due to financial constraints, the club opted to resign from the Northern Premier League and to compete in the Northern Counties East League Premier Division where they again won the title in the 2011–12 season but they rejected promotion opting instead to continue in NCEL.

Retford reached the fifth round (last 16) of the FA Vase in the 2006–07 season, while their best run in the FA Cup has consisted of one appearance in the fourth qualifying round, in the 2008–09 season, where they were defeated 3–1 by Alfreton Town. Their first season in the FA Trophy in 2007–08 took them to the first round where they were defeated 5–2 by Histon. Retford were relegated from the First Division of the NCEL to the Central Midlands North League at the end of season 2017–18.

On 27 June 2022 Ryan Hindley was appointed the new manager, in his first season he won the Central Midlands Alliance North Division after getting 77 points from 28 games, late in the season the Badgers played local rivals SJR Worksop where Mark West scored his 100th goal for the club, after winning the league the club was promoted back to the Northern Counties East League for the 2023-24 season.

== Origins and youth structure ==
When Retford United was formed in 1987 it consisted of a senior team in the Gainsborough & District League and an under 10 youth team. Looking forward the aim was to get the senior team climbing the football league pyramid, and at youth level add a new team at the youngest age group until the club was competing at every level up to the seniors. Also girls football was introduced in the later years and still continues. The first-ever youth games were played on the Jenkins Sports Ground on Thrumpton Lane.

The Junior Section of the club now operate independently at Oaklands as Retford United Junior F.C.

The first senior games were played on the council-owned Goosemoor for a short period before moving to Oaklands and eventually to Cannon Park on Leverton Road at the start of the new millennium.

== Honours ==
- Northern Premier League
  - Division One South Champions 2008–09 (Promoted to Premier Division)
  - Division One South Champions 2007–08 (Could not be promoted to Premier Division after failing a ground inspection)
  - Challenge Cup Runners-up 2009–10
  - Chairman's Cup Winners 2007–08
- Northern Counties East League
  - Premier Division Champions 2006–07, 2011–12
  - Division One Runners-up 2005–06
  - Wilkinson Sword Trophy Winners 2005–06
  - President's Cup Winners 2006–07
- Central Midlands Football League
  - Supreme Division Champions 2003–04
  - North Division Champions 2022–23
  - League Cup Winners 2003–04
  - Trophy Winners 2005–06
  - Floodlit Cup Winners 2003–04
- Nottinghamshire FA Senior Cup
  - Winners 2008–09

== Records ==
- FA Cup
  - Fourth Qualifying Round 2008–09
- FA Trophy
  - First Round 2007–08
- FA Vase
  - Fifth Round 2006–07
