= Lincoln Moorlands Railway A.F.C. =

Association football club in England

Coordinates: 53°12′09.67″N 0°33′53.36″W

Lincoln Moorlands Railway
- Full name: Lincoln Moorlands Railway Football Club
- Nickname: The Moors
- Founded: 1989
- Ground: The Moorlands Railway Sports & Social Club, Lincoln
- Capacity: 2,000
- Chairman: Joe Evans
- Manager: Jason “Humbug” Humberston
- League: Lincolnshire League Premier Division
- 2025–26: Lincolnshire League Premier Division, 3rd of 14
| Home colours | Away colours |

Lincoln Moorlands Railway A.F.C. is a football club based in Lincoln, England. They are currently members of the Lincolnshire League Premier Division and play at the Moorlands Sports & Social Club.

== History ==
The club's predecessors, Lincoln Moorlands F.C. were established in 1989 and joined the Central Midlands League in the same year. After three seasons the club joined the Lincolnshire League but five years later they were back in the CML, winning the Premier Division in their first season back. After two seasons in the Supreme Division they were promoted to the Northern Counties East League after finishing in second place in the 2000–01 season, losing the title on goal difference.

In 2003–04 the club reached the third round of the FA Vase and the following season the club won the Wilkinson Sword League Cup, the NCEL's cup competition for division one clubs.

In the 2006–07 season, Lincoln Moorlands finished in 5th place of the league table, amassing 56 points from their 32 matches. This fell way behind 1st position however, some 26 points back of eventual league winners Parkgate. The club then merged with Lincoln League side Lincoln Railway F.C. and the newly named Lincoln Moorlands Railway was offered the chance to be promoted to the Northern Counties East League Premier Division for the forthcoming 2007–08 season, which they duly accepted. Despite only finishing in 5th place, the promotion came about due to Sutton Town's resignation from the league due to severe financial problems.

The following season, 2007–08, saw the club also benefit from another club's misfortune. They finished in 19th place. They were not relegated due to South Normanton Athletic folding. The club also struggled for most of the 2008–09 season, but avoided a bottom two finish.

The 2010–11 season saw the club finish in their highest position yet, ending in 6th place. The club also reached the third qualifying round of the FA Cup under the management of Chris Moyses.

The following season was less successful and they finished second from bottom. They were only reprieved following Handsworth leaving the League and the league being increased in size to 22 clubs. The season also saw the club experiencing the worst defeat of their 23-year history, losing 9–0 at Bridlington Town.

In the 2013–14 season they lost 33 out of their last 34 games — including an 11–0 defeat by Pickering Town, a club record — which resulted in relegation to Division One of the Northern Counties East Football League.

Towards the end of the 2015–16 season they dropped out of the Northern Counties East League due to various off and on field issues.

The 2016–17 season saw the "Moors" rebuilding start as "Lincoln Moorlands Railway AFC" as they entered the Lincolnshire League, finishing 3rd, and the following season they re-joined the Central Midlands League North Division.

The 2018–19 season saw the Moors put back into the Lincolnshire League by Lincolnshire FA, in a 22-game season the Moors won the League with one game left having won 20 of the 21 games played

== Honours (all as Lincoln Moorlands F.C.) ==
=== League ===
- Lincolnshire League Premier Division (as Lincoln Moorlands Railway AFC)

Winners 2018–2019

Lincolnshire Supplementary Cup Winners 2018–19

- Central Midlands League Supreme Division
  - Winners (1): 1999–2000
  - Runners-Up (1): 2000–01
- Central Midlands League Premier Division
  - Winners (1): 1998–99

=== Cup ===
- NCEL Wilkinson Sword Trophy
  - Winners (1): 2004–05
- Lincolnshire Senior 'A' Cup
  - Winners (2): 2000–01, 2001–02
  - Runners-Up (1): 1999–2000
- Lincolnshire Senior 'B' Cup
  - Winners (3): 1989–90, 1996–97, 1997–98
  - Runners-Up (1): 1998–99

== Records ==
- FA Cup
  - Third Qualifying Round 2010–11
- FA Vase
  - Third Round 2003–04

Lincolnshire League Champions 2018–19

Lincolnshire Supplementary Cup Winners 2018–19
