= 2008–09 Northern Counties East Football League =

The 2008–09 Northern Counties East Football League season was the 27th in the history of Northern Counties East Football League, a football competition in England.

== Premier Division ==
Northern Counties East Football League Premier Division
- Season: 2008–09
- Champions: Mickleover Sports
- Promoted: Mickleover Sports
- Relegated: Eccleshill United
- Matches: 380
- Goals: 1,364 (3.59 per match)

The Premier Division featured 17 clubs which competed in the previous season, along with three new clubs.

- Clubs promoted from Division One:
  - Dinnington Town
  - Hall Road Rangers
- Plus:
  - Bridlington Town, relegated from the Northern Premier League

=== League table ===
Pos	Team	Pld	W	D	L	GF	GA	GD	Pts	Promotion or relegation
1	Mickleover Sports	38	28	4	6	108	47	+61	88	Promoted to the Northern Premier League Division One South
2	Long Eaton United	38	25	6	7	76	40	+36	81	
3	Selby Town	38	25	5	8	89	40	+49	80	
4	Bridlington Town	38	23	7	8	105	51	+54	76	
5	Winterton Rangers	38	19	7	12	74	49	+25	64	
6	Arnold Town	38	17	13	8	58	46	+12	64	
7	Thackley	38	20	2	16	87	62	+25	62	
8	Dinnington Town	38	19	5	14	73	60	+13	62	
9	Pickering Town	38	17	7	14	81	64	+17	58	
10	Hallam	38	17	5	16	78	69	+9	56	
11	Parkgate	38	15	6	17	67	79	−12	51	
12	Maltby Main	38	15	7	16	63	67	−4	49 (Note: Maltby Main were deducted 3 points.)	
13	Nostell Miners Welfare	38	12	13	13	45	51	−6	49	
14	Liversedge	38	14	7	17	60	64	−4	46 (Note: Liversedge were deducted 3 points.)	
15	Armthorpe Welfare	38	14	3	21	61	58	+3	45	
16	Hall Road Rangers	38	11	6	21	53	94	−41	39	
17	Shirebrook Town	38	9	4	25	47	85	−38	31	
18	Lincoln Moorlands Railway	38	9	3	26	45	93	−48	30	
19	Brodsworth Welfare	38	5	8	25	46	92	−46	23	
20	Eccleshill United	38	6	2	30	48	153	−105	20	Relegated to Division One

Source: fchd
Rules for classification: 1) points; 2) goal difference; 3) number of goals scored.

== Division One ==
Northern Counties East Football League Division One
- Season: 2008–09
- Champions: Scarborough Athletic
- Promoted: Rainworth Miners Welfare; Scarborough Athletic
- Matches: 342
- Goals: 1,203 (3.52 per match)

Division One featured 13 clubs which competed in the previous season, along with six clubs:

- Clubs joined from the Central Midlands League:
  - Appleby Frodingham
  - Askern Welfare, who also changed name to Askern Villa
  - Grimsby Borough
- Clubs joined from the West Riding County League:
  - Brighouse Town
  - Hemsworth Miners Welfare
- Plus:
  - Glasshoughton Welfare, relegated from the Premier Division

Also, Leeds Met Carnegie changed name to Leeds Carnegie.

=== League table ===
Pos	Team	Pld	W	D	L	GF	GA	GD	Pts	Promotion or relegation
1	Scarborough Athletic	36	29	5	2	121	24	+97	92	Promoted to the Premier Division
2	Rainworth Miners Welfare	36	23	9	4	90	42	+48	78	Promoted to the Premier Division
3	Askern Villa	36	21	9	6	65	34	+31	72	
4	Staveley Miners Welfare	36	20	8	8	77	43	+34	68	
5	Barton Town Old Boys	36	20	7	9	76	53	+23	67	
6	Bottesford Town	36	20	2	14	77	62	+15	62	
7	Leeds Carnegie	36	17	10	9	79	41	+38	61	
8	AFC Emley	36	17	9	10	59	48	+11	60	
9	Pontefract Collieries	36	16	5	15	62	56	+6	53	
10	Hemsworth Miners Welfare	36	13	11	12	57	52	+5	50	
11	Rossington Main	36	12	7	17	53	67	−14	43	
12	Appleby Frodingham	36	11	9	16	58	79	−21	42	
13	Grimsby Borough	36	11	7	18	52	68	−16	40	
14	Teversal	36	12	3	21	59	86	−27	39	
15	Brighouse Town	36	9	8	19	55	73	−18	35	
16	Worsbrough Bridge Athletic	36	9	5	22	45	86	−41	32	
17	Tadcaster Albion	36	9	4	23	47	94	−47	31	
18	Yorkshire Amateur	36	7	8	21	42	77	−35	29	
19	Glasshoughton Welfare	36	0	6	30	29	118	−89	6	

Source: fchd
Rules for classification: 1) points; 2) goal difference; 3) number of goals scored.
