= 2015–16 Northern Counties East Football League =

The 2015–16 Northern Counties East Football League season was the 34th in the history of the Northern Counties East Football League, a football competition in England.

For the first time, a series of Division 1 play-offs will decide a third promotion winner to the Premier Division.

== Premier Division ==
Northern Counties East Football League Premier Division
- Season: 2015–16
- Champions: Tadcaster Albion
- Promoted: Tadcaster Albion
- Relegated: Pontefract Collieries; Brigg Town; Nostell Miners Welfare
- Matches: 462
- Goals: 1,721 (3.73 per match)
- Top goalscorer: Jon Froggatt, Handsworth Parramore (31)
- Biggest home win: Worksop Town 8 – 1 Garforth Town, 27 January 2016
- Biggest away win: Retford United 0 – 8 Cleethorpes Town, 22 September 2015
- Highest scoring: Pontefract Collieries 4 – 6 Staveley Miners Welfare, 28 November 2015
- Highest attendance: 879 – Worksop Town 1 – 2 Tadcaster Albion, 21 October 2015
- Lowest attendance: 30 – Nostell Miners Welfare 0 – 4 Barton Town Old Boys, 5 December 2015
- Average attendance: 134

The Premier Division featured 18 clubs which competed in the previous season, along with four new clubs.

- Clubs promoted from Division One:
  - Clipstone
  - Pontefract Collieries
- Clubs relegated from the Northern Premier League:
  - Brigg Town
  - Rainworth Miners Welfare

=== League table ===
Pos	Team	Pld	W	D	L	GF	GA	GD	Pts	Promotion or relegation
1	Tadcaster Albion	42	31	5	6	119	50	+69	98	Promoted to the Northern Premier League Division One North
2	Handsworth Parramore	42	29	7	6	113	53	+60	94	
3	Cleethorpes Town	42	26	6	10	105	46	+59	84	
4	Worksop Town	42	26	5	11	118	60	+58	83	
5	Bridlington Town	42	25	4	13	83	54	+29	79	
6	Pickering Town	42	24	5	13	94	69	+25	77	
7	Maltby Main	42	20	8	14	85	77	+8	68	
8	Staveley Miners Welfare	42	20	6	16	86	72	+14	66	
9	Rainworth Miners Welfare	42	19	6	17	98	81	+17	63	
10	Barton Town Old Boys	42	18	8	16	75	60	+15	62	
11	Albion Sports	42	17	8	17	80	77	+3	59	
12	Thackley	42	17	8	17	80	84	−4	59	
13	Clipstone	42	15	10	17	85	70	+15	55	
14	Liversedge	42	13	9	20	61	93	−32	48	
15	Retford United	42	12	9	21	66	96	−30	45	
16	Garforth Town	42	12	7	23	64	89	−25	43	
17	Parkgate	42	12	6	24	55	90	−35	42	
18	Athersley Recreation	42	12	6	24	52	93	−41	42	
19	Armthorpe Welfare	42	10	10	22	55	92	−37	40	
20	Pontefract Collieries	42	11	6	25	60	110	−50	39	Relegated to Division One
21	Brigg Town	42	10	7	25	49	103	−54	37	Relegated to Division One
22	Nostell Miners Welfare	42	6	8	28	38	102	−64	26	Relegated to Division One

Source: fchd
Rules for classification: 1) points; 2) goal difference; 3) number of goals scored.

=== Results ===
Home \ Away	ALB	ARM	ATR	BAR	BRI	BRG	CLE	CLP	GAR	HPA	LIV	MAL	NMW	PAR	PIC	POC	RAI	RET	SMW	TAD	THA	WKS
Albion Sports		4–1	3–1	3–5	1–5	2–1	4–1	0–0	1–0	0–1	5–1	1–3	2–1	1–0	2–5	4–3	2–3	3–1	0–0	0–2	1–3	1–1
Armthorpe Welfare	2–2		0–1	1–5	0–2	1–0	1–1	1–6	3–1	0–2	5–1	2–5	2–1	2–3	2–3	3–0	2–2	1–1	0–4	2–2	2–0	0–4
Athersley Recreation	0–3	0–0		1–1	1–2	0–3	1–2	2–0	5–0	0–2	3–1	0–2	2–0	0–3	1–4	2–1	4–1	1–2	0–4	0–5	2–2	0–6
Barton Town Old Boys	0–1	1–1	0–1		2–0	1–0	0–3	0–2	4–0	0–1	2–4	2–2	3–0	3–0	1–1	2–0	0–0	2–1	1–1	4–3	3–1	2–2
Bridlington Town	2–1	1–0	4–0	0–1		7–1	2–1	2–1	1–2	1–0	1–1	4–2	1–3	0–3	0–1	2–1	0–1	5–2	2–0	0–1	2–2	1–3
Brigg Town	3–3	2–2	1–1	2–1	0–4		0–4	3–2	0–4	2–0	2–1	1–2	1–3	1–0	0–5	4–1	1–4	1–2	2–3	1–3	4–4	2–2
Cleethorpes Town	1–0	4–1	3–1	0–2	0–2	5–0		3–3	1–2	1–1	3–0	5–1	0–1	4–0	2–3	4–0	3–1	5–1	3–2	1–0	1–0	3–0
Clipstone	1–1	2–3	2–3	0–2	0–1	2–0	2–3		5–0	2–2	0–0	2–2	4–0	0–1	3–2	1–2	3–0	7–0	0–3	2–2	1–2	3–1
Garforth Town	0–2	2–2	2–0	0–2	3–3	2–0	0–1	2–2		0–2	2–1	2–2	2–0	2–3	2–4	6–1	3–2	1–4	2–0	0–1	3–4	0–1
Handsworth Parramore	6–3	5–0	7–1	4–3	2–4	2–0	1–1	6–0	1–1		0–0	1–0	5–0	4–3	3–0	2–1	2–1	3–1	2–4	1–4	3–3	5–0
Liversedge	2–1	4–0	2–0	4–3	1–4	1–2	1–0	4–1	1–6	1–1		1–4	3–1	4–0	0–1	3–1	3–1	0–0	1–5	0–4	2–1	1–4
Maltby Main	2–1	2–1	1–0	1–0	2–1	0–0	2–5	3–3	0–1	1–2	2–2		6–0	1–0	1–2	2–0	0–1	2–1	2–5	4–2	1–2	3–2
Nostell Miners Welfare	1–4	1–1	1–3	0–4	1–2	0–1	0–3	1–6	0–0	1–2	0–0	4–0		1–1	2–1	2–2	2–4	2–0	1–2	0–5	1–4	1–4
Parkgate	0–3	0–1	1–4	2–3	2–1	3–0	2–1	1–3	2–1	1–3	2–2	0–2	1–1		0–3	2–2	1–2	2–6	1–2	1–1	0–2	0–4
Pickering Town	1–0	2–0	1–1	2–1	2–3	4–1	0–3	3–2	5–1	2–3	2–1	3–3	5–2	3–2		1–2	4–2	2–2	3–1	1–3	1–1	2–3
Pontefract Collieries	2–2	1–3	3–0	1–3	3–1	2–2	0–6	1–0	4–3	1–6	2–1	2–5	1–1	1–3	1–2		3–1	2–5	4–6	0–1	2–5	1–7
Rainworth Miners Welfare	1–3	6–0	3–1	5–0	1–1	3–2	6–3	1–3	4–2	1–2	7–1	3–1	6–0	2–3	4–2	0–1		2–2	2–2	1–3	1–0	1–3
Retford United	0–1	0–6	3–3	1–0	1–3	6–0	0–8	2–0	1–1	0–1	1–2	1–5	0–0	3–2	1–0	1–3	2–2		2–1	0–1	1–2	2–2
Staveley Miners Welfare	3–1	3–0	0–1	2–2	0–2	0–2	0–3	2–2	2–1	2–6	3–1	2–2	2–1	4–0	0–1	0–1	0–2	2–1		2–1	3–0	1–4
Tadcaster Albion	4–4	2–1	4–3	2–1	4–1	5–0	0–0	1–2	1–0	5–2	4–1	6–3	4–0	3–4	4–1	2–0	4–3	5–0	2–0		4–0	4–1
Thackley	4–2	3–0	4–2	2–1	1–2	2–1	2–3	0–2	3–1	0–6	1–1	0–1	2–1	0–0	1–3	1–1	6–3	1–3	5–3	2–3		1–2
Worksop Town	3–2	1–0	4–0	3–2	0–1	4–0	1–1	2–3	8–1	2–3	6–0	4–0	1–0	4–0	2–1	3–0	1–2	4–3	3–4	1–2	5–1	

Source: League Official
Legend: Blue = home team win; Yellow = draw; Red = away team win.

=== Stadia and locations ===
Location of the clubs in the 2015–16
NCEL Premier Division on a map of
Yorkshire and the Humber

Club	Stadium
Albion Sports	Throstle Nest (Note: home of Farsley Celtic – groundshare)
Armthorpe Welfare	Welfare Ground
Athersley Recreation	Sheerien Park
Barton Town Old Boys	Euronics Ground
Bridlington Town	Queensgate
Brigg Town	The Hawthorns
Cleethorpes Town	Bradley Football Centre
Clipstone	Clipstone Road
Garforth Town	Wheatley Park
Handsworth Parramore	Sandy Lane
Liversedge	Clayborn Ground
Maltby Main	Muglet Lane
Nostell Miners Welfare	The Welfare Ground
Parkgate	Roundwood Sports Complex
Pickering Town	Recreation Club
Pontefract Collieries	Skinner Lane
Rainworth Miners Welfare	Welfare Ground
Retford United	Cannon Park
Staveley Miners Welfare	Inkersall Road
Tadcaster Albion	Ings Lane
Thackley	Dennyfield
Worksop Town	Sandy Lane (Note: home of Handsworth Parramore – groundshare)

== Division One ==
Northern Counties East Football League Division One
- Season: 2015–16
- Champions: Hemsworth Miners Welfare
- Promoted: Hemsworth Miners Welfare; AFC Mansfield; Bottesford Town
- Matches: 420
- Goals: 1,659 (3.95 per match)
- Top goalscorer: Ashley Flynn, AFC Emley (59)
- Biggest home win: AFC Emley 13 – 0 Grimsby Borough, 24 October 2015
- Biggest away win: Worsbrough Bridge Athletic 0 – 7 AFC Emley, 18 April 2016
- Highest scoring: AFC Emley 13 – 0 Grimsby Borough, 24 October 2015
- Highest attendance: 617 – Hull United 3 – 0 Dronfield Town, 15 August 2015
- Lowest attendance: 22 – Worsbrough Bridge Athletic 1 – 7 Westella & Willerby, 23 February 2016
- Average attendance: 93

Division One featured 19 clubs which competed in the previous season, along with three new clubs:

- Glasshoughton Welfare, relegated from the Premier Division
- Hull United, promoted from the Humber Premier League
- Westella & Willerby, promoted from the Central Midlands Football League

=== League table ===
Pos	Team	Pld	W	D	L	GF	GA	GD	Pts	Promotion or relegation
1	Hemsworth Miners Welfare	40	31	5	4	128	49	+79	98	Promoted to the Premier Division
2	AFC Mansfield	40	26	8	6	98	40	+58	86	Promoted to the Premier Division
3	Bottesford Town	40	26	4	10	93	49	+44	82	Qualified for the play-offs, then promoted to the Premier Division
4	AFC Emley	40	22	11	7	132	50	+82	77	Qualified for the play-offs
5	Penistone Church	40	21	12	7	89	49	+40	75	Qualified for the play-offs
6	Hallam	40	20	12	8	87	43	+44	72	Qualified for the play-offs
7	Shirebrook Town	40	20	9	11	83	53	+30	69	
8	Knaresborough Town	40	19	7	14	82	60	+22	64	
9	Hull United	40	23	7	10	78	47	+31	58 (Note: Hull United were deducted 18 points)	Resigned to the Humber Premier League
10	Selby Town	40	16	9	15	73	73	0	57	
11	Yorkshire Amateur	40	17	5	18	90	101	−11	56	
12	Westella & Willerby	40	16	5	19	90	83	+7	53	
13	Eccleshill United	40	13	9	18	86	90	−4	48	
14	Teversal	40	11	12	17	62	90	−28	45	
15	Dronfield Town	40	12	7	21	67	88	−21	43	
16	Glasshoughton Welfare	40	10	7	23	62	101	−39	37	
17	Hall Road Rangers	40	7	11	22	60	106	−46	32	
18	Winterton Rangers	40	8	8	24	58	116	−58	32	
19	Grimsby Borough	40	8	8	24	64	132	−68	32	
20	Rossington Main	40	6	8	26	45	105	−60	26	
21	Worsbrough Bridge Athletic	40	3	6	31	32	134	−102	15	
22	Lincoln Moorlands Railway	0	0	0	0	0	0	0	0	Club resigned, record expunged

Source: fchd
Rules for classification: 1) points; 2) goal difference; 3) number of goals scored.

==== Play-offs ====
Semi-finals
3	Bottesford Town	2
6	Hallam	0
4	AFC Emley	1
5	Penistone Church	0

Final
3	Bottesford Town	1(4)
4	AFC Emley	1(3)

Semi-finals

26 April 2016	AFC Emley	1–0	Penistone Church	Welfare Ground, Emley
	Ryan 87'			Attendance: 463

27 April 2016	Bottesford Town	2–0	Hallam	Birch Park, Bottesford
	Graves 72', 85'			Attendance: 275

Final

30 April 2016	Bottesford Town	1–1 (4–3 p)	AFC Emley	Birch Park, Bottesford
	Barwick 90'		Tunnacliffe 74'	Attendance: 280

=== Results ===
Home \ Away	AFE	AFCM	BOT	DRO	ECC	GLW	GRB	HRR	HAL	HMW	HLU	KNA	LIN	PCH	ROM	SEL	SHI	TEV	WAW	WIR	WBA	YOA
AFC Emley		3–5	2–3	4–0	1–1	5–0	13–0	4–1	1–1	3–0	2–2	2–0		2–0	5–0	3–3	2–2	4–0	6–3	10–0	5–0	4–0
AFC Mansfield	3–5		2–0	2–0	2–0	3–1	6–0	5–0	0–0	0–1	1–0	1–1		1–2	1–1	3–1	1–1	2–1	1–1	8–0	9–0	3–1
Bottesford Town	4–2	0–2		3–1	4–2	5–1	7–0	4–2	2–0	2–1	1–2	1–2		0–0	1–0	3–0	1–3	2–0	0–2	1–0	2–0	5–1
Dronfield Town	0–4	1–2	2–2		2–4	2–1	4–0	2–3	1–1	1–2	9–0	0–3		2–3	2–2	4–1	1–1	1–1	1–5	2–0	2–0	1–2
Eccleshill United	1–4	1–3	1–3	4–2		1–0	9–1	4–3	2–2	1–3	0–2	3–1		1–1	1–1	2–2	2–0	1–1	3–4	7–2	6–2	6–2
Glasshoughton Welfare	2–3	1–4	2–3	1–1	2–1		3–0	1–1	2–4	1–2	1–2	0–5		3–3	5–0	0–3	1–4	2–3	2–1	1–3	5–1	3–3
Grimsby Borough	1–1	0–1	2–1	3–1	3–3	2–2		6–3	0–5	2–3	1–2	1–3		2–3	2–2	1–3	2–4	5–3	2–2	5–0	3–1	1–4
Hall Road Rangers	1–4	1–1	1–6	1–2	5–5	1–2	4–0		0–1	0–3	2–1	1–1		0–3	0–3	0–0	2–6	1–2	2–5	1–1	6–0	0–0
Hallam	2–2	3–1	2–3	4–1	0–1	2–3	2–2	5–0		1–2	0–2	4–2		0–0	5–1	3–1	1–1	2–0	2–0	2–4	3–0	1–2
Hemsworth Miners Welfare	2–1	0–2	3–0	4–0	4–0	1–1	3–2	9–2	2–2		1–1	6–1		3–3	4–0	5–2	2–1	6–0	5–2	5–2	8–1	6–1
Hull United	2–1	1–3	2–1	3–0	1–1	4–0	7–0	1–0	0–1	1–3		0–0		1–2	3–0	0–3	2–0	2–2	4–2	2–1	5–0	4–1
Knaresborough Town	0–0	0–1	0–4	3–1	5–3	4–1	3–0	0–1	0–2	2–4	2–1			0–0	5–0	2–1	2–3	3–0	2–1	3–4	2–1	2–2
Lincoln Moorlands Railway																						
Penistone Church	1–1	2–3	2–0	5–1	3–0	2–2	4–1	2–2	1–1	4–1	0–2	3–0			3–0	4–5	1–2	5–1	4–2	1–0	6–1	2–0
Rossington Main	2–2	2–3	0–1	1–2	1–0	1–3	2–1	4–1	0–0	1–3	1–2	3–1		0–4		1–2	0–4	0–5	2–5	1–3	0–2	0–2
Selby Town	1–0	2–2	2–2	2–4	1–0	4–0	5–2	1–0	0–0	2–4	1–3	0–5		1–1	3–1		1–2	0–1	2–1	4–0	2–2	3–1
Shirebrook Town	1–2	0–0	0–1	3–0	0–2	5–1	0–2	4–1	1–2	2–2	2–0	1–1		3–0	6–3	3–1		0–3	1–2	5–2	1–0	4–1
Teversal	0–5	1–0	2–5	1–1	2–0	0–2	2–2	3–3	0–5	0–1	0–5	2–0		2–2	2–0	1–1	2–2		0–3	7–1	1–1	2–5
Westella & Willerby	4–3	0–3	0–1	1–3	5–2	4–0	4–0	2–3	1–4	1–2	1–1	0–3		1–2	1–1	3–0	0–2	3–3		1–0	1–2	1–4
Winterton Rangers	1–1	4–1	1–1	3–4	5–0	1–2	1–3	1–1	0–4	0–4	1–1	1–5		0–1	3–3	0–4	0–0	3–1	2–3		3–0	2–6
Worsbrough Bridge Athletic	0–7	0–3	1–6	0–2	2–3	2–1	1–1	1–1	1–5	0–4	0–3	1–2		0–3	1–2	0–2	1–2	2–3	1–7	1–1		2–2
Yorkshire Amateur	1–3	2–4	1–2	3–1	3–2	5–1	5–3	1–3	1–3	1–4	0–1	0–6		2–1	6–3	4–1	3–1	2–2	2–5	4–2	4–1	

Source: League Official
Legend: Blue = home team win; Yellow = draw; Red = away team win.

=== Stadia and locations ===
Location of the clubs in the 2015–16
NCEL Division One on a map of
Yorkshire and the Humber

Club	Stadium
Bottesford Town	Birch Park
Dronfield Town	Stonelow Ground
Eccleshill United	Kings Way
AFC Emley	The Welfare Ground
Glasshoughton Welfare	Glasshoughton Centre
Grimsby Borough	Bradley Football Centre
Hall Road Rangers	Howarth Park
Hallam	Sandygate Road
Hemsworth Miners Welfare	Fitzwilliam Stadium
Hull United	Craven Park
Knaresborough Town	Manse Lane
Lincoln Moorlands Railway	Lincoln Moorlands Club
AFC Mansfield	Forest Town Stadium
Penistone Church	Church View Road
Rossington Main	Welfare Ground
Selby Town	Richard Street
Shirebrook Town	Langwith Road
Teversal	Teversal Grange
Westella & Willerby	Euronics Ground (Note: home of Barton Town Old Boys – groundshare)
Winterton Rangers	West Street
Worsbrough Bridge Athletic	Park Road
Yorkshire Amateur	Bracken Edge

== League Cup ==
2015–16 Northern Counties East Football League League Cup
Tournament details
- Country: England
- Teams: 44

The 2015–16 Northern Counties East Football League League Cup is the 34th season of the league cup competition of the Northern Counties East Football League.

=== First round ===
Home team	Score	Away team	Attendance
Glasshoughton Welfare	4–3 (aet)	Lincoln Moorlands Railway	60
Hemsworth Miners Welfare	3–4	A.F.C. Emley	89
Shirebrook Town	1–0	Dronfield Town	113

Home team	Score	Away team	Attendance
Teversal	1–0	Hull United	59
Westella & Willerby	0–1	Selby Town	127
Yorkshire Amateur	5–4	Hall Road Rangers	53

=== Second round ===
Home team	Score	Away team	Attendance
A.F.C. Emley	3–3 (aet)	Liversedge	106
AFC Emley win 3–2 on penalties.
Albion Sports	5–0	Nostell Miners Welfare	40
Athersley Recreation	0–2	Penistone Church	113

Home team	Score	Away team	Attendance
Barton Town Old Boys	2–1	Rossington Main	86
Winterton Rangers	2–4	Pontefract Collieries	41
Worsbrough Bridge Athletic	0–1	Brigg Town	51

=== Third round ===
Home team	Score	Away team	Attendance
A.F.C. Mansfield	1–2	Knaresborough Town	58
Bottesford Town	2–3	A.F.C. Emley	46
Bridlington Town	4–0	Brigg Town	84
Clipstone	1–2	Grimsby Borough	44
Garforth Town	1–2	Staveley Miners Welfare	80
Glasshoughton Welfare	0–2	Pickering Town	66
Handsworth Parramore	5–1	Shirebrook Town	73
Hallam	1–2	Selby Town	81

Home team	Score	Away team	Attendance
Parkgate	1–3	Tadcaster Albion	107
Penistone Church	4–0	Maltby Main	78
Retford United	3–5	Armthorpe Welfare	56
Teversal	3–4	Albion Sports	53
Thackley	4–2 (aet)	Eccleshill United	113
Winterton Rangers	0–4	Cleethorpes Town	64
Worksop Town	0–2	Barton Town Old Boys	204
Yorkshire Amateur	2–3	Rainworth Miners Welfare	38

=== Fourth round ===
Home team	Score	Away team	Attendance
A.F.C. Emley	2–3	Knaresborough Town	129
Albion Sports	4–2	Barton Town Old Boys	21
Armthorpe Welfare	1–4	Rainworth Miners Welfare	58
Cleethorpes Town	4–3	Staveley Miners Welfare	70

Home team	Score	Away team	Attendance
Grimsby Borough	1–2	Tadcaster Albion	165
Penistone Church	0–2	Bridlington Town	77
Selby Town	1–2	Handsworth Parramore	88
Thackley	5–1	Glasshoughton Welfare	38

=== Fifth round ===
Home team	Score	Away team	Attendance
Handsworth Parramore	3–5 (aet)	Cleethorpes Town	99
Knaresborough Town	1–3	Tadcaster Albion	251

Home team	Score	Away team	Attendance
Rainworth Miners Welfare	0–5	Albion Sports	61
Thackley	2–3	Bridlington Town	44

=== Semi-finals ===
Home team	Score	Away team	Attendance
Bridlington Town	0-1	Cleethorpes Town	85

Home team	Score	Away team	Attendance
Tadcaster Albion	2-1	Albion Sports	201

=== Final ===
Played on 14 May 2016 at Garforth.

First team	Score	Second team	Attendance
Cleethorpes Town	3-2	Tadcaster Albion	423
