= 2009–10 Northern Counties East Football League =

The 2009–10 Northern Counties East Football League season was the 28th in the history of Northern Counties East Football League, a football competition in England.

== Premier Division ==
Northern Counties East Football League Premier Division
- Season: 2009–10
- Champions: Bridlington Town
- Promoted: Rainworth Miners Welfare
- Relegated: Brodsworth Welfare; Shirebrook Town
- Matches: 380
- Goals: 1,485 (3.91 per match)

The Premier Division featured 18 clubs which competed in the previous season, along with two new clubs, promoted from Division One:

- Rainworth Miners Welfare
- Scarborough Athletic

=== League table ===
Pos	Team	Pld	W	D	L	GF	GA	GD	Pts	Promotion or relegation
1	Bridlington Town	38	30	4	4	123	36	+87	94	
2	Rainworth Miners Welfare	38	26	5	7	98	46	+52	83	Promoted to the Northern Premier League Division One South
3	Armthorpe Welfare	38	24	7	7	102	48	+54	79	
4	Thackley	38	25	1	12	113	54	+59	76	
5	Scarborough Athletic	38	22	4	12	100	57	+43	70	
6	Winterton Rangers	38	22	3	13	70	43	+27	69	
7	Pickering Town	38	20	5	13	82	58	+24	65	
8	Arnold Town	38	18	7	13	84	69	+15	61	
9	Liversedge	38	17	5	16	89	83	+6	56	
10	Long Eaton United	38	15	8	15	58	52	+6	53	
11	Hall Road Rangers	38	15	6	17	72	80	−8	51	
12	Dinnington Town	38	14	7	17	62	83	−21	49	
13	Selby Town	38	14	6	18	60	84	−24	48	
14	Parkgate	38	13	6	19	83	87	−4	45	
15	Hallam	38	12	6	20	82	93	−11	42	
16	Maltby Main	38	11	9	18	47	70	−23	42	
17	Lincoln Moorlands Railway	38	10	8	20	57	85	−28	38	
18	Nostell Miners Welfare	38	9	8	21	51	80	−29	35	
19	Shirebrook Town	38	8	3	27	35	95	−60	27	Relegated to Division One
20	Brodsworth Welfare	38	0	2	36	17	182	−165	2	Relegated to Division One

Source: fchd
Rules for classification: 1) points; 2) goal difference; 3) number of goals scored.

== Division One ==
Northern Counties East Football League Division One
- Season: 2009–10
- Champions: Tadcaster Albion
- Promoted: Brighouse Town; Tadcaster Albion
- Matches: 306
- Goals: 1,109 (3.62 per match)

Division One featured 17 clubs which competed in the previous season, along with one new club, relegated from the Premier Division:

- Eccleshill United

=== League table ===
Pos	Team	Pld	W	D	L	GF	GA	GD	Pts	Promotion or relegation
1	Tadcaster Albion	34	22	8	4	80	37	+43	74	Promoted to the Premier Division
2	Brighouse Town	34	23	4	7	80	41	+39	73	Promoted to the Premier Division
3	Leeds Carnegie	34	23	6	5	101	37	+64	72 (Note: Leeds Carnegie were deducted 3 points.)	
4	Staveley Miners Welfare	34	21	5	8	87	46	+41	68	
5	Pontefract Collieries	34	17	8	9	59	49	+10	59	
6	Barton Town Old Boys	34	18	6	10	59	55	+4	57 (Note: Barton Town Old Boys were deducted 3 points.)	
7	Hemsworth Miners Welfare	34	17	4	13	81	68	+13	55	
8	AFC Emley	34	15	8	11	69	50	+19	53	
9	Bottesford Town	34	13	6	15	62	66	−4	45	
10	Rossington Main	34	11	9	14	52	66	−14	42	
11	Teversal	34	12	5	17	56	66	−10	41	
12	Askern Villa	34	14	4	16	63	65	−2	36 (Note: Askern Villa were deducted 10 points.)	
13	Glasshoughton Welfare	34	10	5	19	47	66	−19	35	
14	Yorkshire Amateur	34	10	4	20	48	70	−22	34	
15	Appleby Frodingham	34	10	4	20	48	75	−27	34	
16	Eccleshill United	34	8	4	22	45	96	−51	28	
17	Grimsby Borough	34	6	7	21	36	70	−34	25	
18	Worsbrough Bridge Athletic	34	5	5	24	36	86	−50	20	

Source: fchd
Rules for classification: 1) points; 2) goal difference; 3) number of goals scored.
