= 2016–17 Northern Counties East Football League =

The 2016–17 Northern Counties East Football League season was the 35th in the history of Northern Counties East Football League, a football competition in England.

Club allocations was approved 12 May 2016.

== Premier Division ==
Northern Counties East Football League Premier Division
- Season: 2016–17
- Champions: Cleethorpes Town
- Promoted: Cleethorpes Town
- Relegated: Armthorpe Welfare; Retford United
- Matches: 462
- Goals: 1,826 (3.95 per match)
- Top goalscorer: Aaron Moxam, Handsworth Parramore (40)
- Biggest home win: AFC Mansfield 13 – 0 Retford United
- Biggest away win: Retford United 0 – 7 Barton Town Old Boys; Harrogate Railway Athletic 0 – 7 Handsworth Parramore; Barton Town Old Boys 0 – 7 Pickering Town
- Highest scoring: AFC Mansfield 13 – 0 Retford United
- Highest attendance: 617 – Retford United 0 – 2 Worksop Town
- Lowest attendance: 32 – Maltby Main 4 – 1 Barton Town Old Boys
- Average attendance: 127

The Premier Division featured 18 clubs which competed in the previous season, along with four new clubs.

- Clubs promoted from Division One:
  - AFC Mansfield
  - Bottesford Town
  - Hemsworth Miners Welfare
- Plus:
  - Harrogate Railway Athletic, relegated from the Northern Premier League

=== League table ===
Pos	Team	Pld	W	D	L	GF	GA	GD	Pts	Promotion or relegation
1	Cleethorpes Town	42	35	3	4	144	45	+99	108	Promoted to the Northern Premier League Division One South
2	Pickering Town	42	30	7	5	111	39	+72	97	
3	Bridlington Town	42	28	4	10	112	59	+53	88	
4	Handsworth Parramore	42	26	5	11	127	52	+75	83	
5	Thackley	42	23	9	10	81	46	+35	78	
6	Staveley Miners Welfare	42	20	9	13	96	60	+36	69	
7	AFC Mansfield	42	20	6	16	79	55	+24	66	
8	Albion Sports	42	20	6	16	100	99	+1	66	
9	Hemsworth Miners Welfare	42	19	8	15	92	80	+12	65	
10	Athersley Recreation	42	17	11	14	76	84	−8	62	
11	Liversedge	42	17	8	17	99	73	+26	59	
12	Bottesford Town	42	17	5	20	86	87	−1	56	
13	Worksop Town	42	16	7	19	77	83	−6	55	
14	Maltby Main	42	14	12	16	76	92	−16	54	
15	Garforth Town	42	16	5	21	68	87	−19	53	
16	Clipstone	42	13	10	19	61	83	−22	49	
17	Parkgate	42	11	8	23	56	86	−30	41	
18	Rainworth Miners Welfare	42	11	5	26	71	107	−36	38	
19	Harrogate Railway Athletic	42	11	5	26	60	130	−70	38	
20	Barton Town Old Boys	42	9	7	26	57	132	−75	34	
21	Armthorpe Welfare	42	6	6	30	47	115	−68	24	Relegated to Division One
22	Retford United	42	7	6	29	50	132	−82	24 (Note: Retford United were deducted three points for fielding an ineligible player against Worksop Town on 3 September 2016.)	Relegated to Division One

Source: NCEFL Tables
Rules for classification: 1) Points; 2) Goal difference; 3) Number of goals scored; 4) Number of matches won; 5) Head-to-head results

=== Stadia and locations ===
Location of the clubs in the 2016–17
NCEL Premier Division on a map of
Yorkshire and the Humber

Club	Stadium
Albion Sports	Throstle Nest (Note: home of Farsley Celtic (groundshare))
Armthorpe Welfare	Welfare Ground
Athersley Recreation	Sheerien Park
Barton Town Old Boys	Euronics Ground
Bottesford Town	Birch Park
Bridlington Town	Queensgate
Cleethorpes Town	Bradley Football Centre
Clipstone	Clipstone Road
Garforth Town	Wheatley Park
Handsworth Parramore	Sandy Lane
Harrogate Railway Athletic	Station View
Hemsworth Miners Welfare	Fitzwilliam Stadium
Liversedge	Clayborn Ground
Maltby Main	Muglet Lane
AFC Mansfield	Forest Town Stadium
Parkgate	Roundwood Sports Complex
Pickering Town	Recreation Club
Rainworth Miners Welfare	Welfare Ground
Retford United	Cannon Park
Staveley Miners Welfare	Inkersall Road
Thackley	Dennyfield
Worksop Town	Sandy Lane (Note: home of Handsworth Parramore (groundshare))

== Division One ==
Northern Counties East Football League Division One
- Season: 2016–17
- Champions: Hall Road Rangers
- Promoted: Hall Road Rangers; Pontefract Collieries
- Relegated: Nostell Miners Welfare
- Matches: 462
- Goals: 1,686 (3.65 per match)
- Top goalscorer: Ashley Flynn, AFC Emley (46)
- Biggest home win: Pontefract Collieries 9 – 0 Ollerton Town
- Biggest away win: Worsbrough Bridge Athletic 1 – 9 Hallam
- Highest scoring: Penistone Church 9 – 5 Grimsby Borough
- Highest attendance: 427 – Knaresborough Town 1 – 5 Pontefract Collieries
- Lowest attendance: 10 – Worsbrough Bridge Athletic 1 – 7 Eccleshill United
- Average attendance: 94

Division One featured 17 clubs which competed in the previous season, along with five new clubs.

- Clubs relegated from the Premier Division:
  - Brigg Town
  - Nostell Miners Welfare
  - Pontefract Collieries
- Plus:
  - Campion – promoted from the West Riding County Amateur Football League
  - Ollerton Town – promoted from the Central Midlands League

=== League table ===
Pos	Team	Pld	W	D	L	GF	GA	GD	Pts	Promotion or qualification
1	Hall Road Rangers	42	30	6	6	107	45	+62	96	Promoted to the Premier Division
2	Pontefract Collieries	42	30	5	7	123	48	+75	95	Promoted to the Premier Division
3	AFC Emley	42	30	5	7	120	48	+72	95	Qualified for the play-offs (Note: Four teams play for one spot and promotion to the Premier Division.)
4	Grimsby Borough	42	27	8	7	102	56	+46	89	Qualified for the play-offs
5	Hallam	42	25	7	10	107	48	+59	82	Qualified for the play-offs
6	Penistone Church	42	24	10	8	89	51	+38	82	Qualified for the play-offs, then promoted to the Premier Division
7	Knaresborough Town	42	19	13	10	80	61	+19	70	
8	Campion	42	20	8	14	98	70	+28	68	
9	Eccleshill United	42	20	6	16	95	80	+15	66	
10	Selby Town	42	16	13	13	61	63	−2	61	
11	Glasshoughton Welfare	42	17	8	17	82	73	+9	59	
12	Winterton Rangers	42	18	5	19	77	69	+8	59	
13	Yorkshire Amateur	42	15	8	19	80	84	−4	53	
14	Brigg Town	42	15	4	23	60	102	−42	49	
15	Rossington Main	42	12	9	21	57	74	−17	45	
16	Teversal	42	13	6	23	59	86	−27	45	Transferred to the East Midlands Counties League
17	Ollerton Town	42	12	7	23	57	86	−29	43	
18	Shirebrook Town	42	11	6	25	48	95	−47	39	
19	Dronfield Town	42	10	5	27	54	98	−44	35	
20	Worsbrough Bridge Athletic	42	10	5	27	38	113	−75	35	
21	Westella & Willerby	42	7	6	29	45	104	−59	27	Relegated to the Humber Premier League
22	Nostell Miners Welfare	42	3	6	33	47	132	−85	15	Reprieved from relegation (Note: Westella & Willerby were offered a reprieve due to movement in the higher league, but declined it. Thus, Nostell Miners Welfare were reprieved.)

Source: NCEFL Tables
Rules for classification: 1) Points; 2) Goal difference; 3) Number of goals scored; 4) Number of matches won; 5) Head-to-head results

==== Play-offs ====
Semi-finals
4	Grimsby Borough	3
5	Hallam	2
3	AFC Emley	1
6	Penistone Church	3

Final
4	Grimsby Borough	2
6	Penistone Church	4

Semi-finals

26 April 2017	Grimsby Borough	3–2	Hallam	Grimsby
	Winfarrah 47'; Debnam 55'; Drury 72'	Report	Blythen 43', 45'	Stadium: The Bradley Football Development Centre; Attendance: 187

26 April 2017	AFC Emley	1–3	Penistone Church	Emley
	Flynn 77'	Report	Ring 3'; Schofield 35' (o.g.); Moore 64' (pen.)	Stadium: Welfare Ground; Attendance: 806

Final

29 April 2017	Grimsby Borough	2–4	Penistone Church	Grimsby
	Drury 35'; Debnam 75'	Report	Moore 28'; Ring 30', 60'; Barlow 44'	Stadium: The Bradley Football Development Centre; Attendance: 220

=== Stadia and locations ===
Location of the clubs in the 2015–16 NCEL
Division One on a map of
Yorkshire and the Humber

Club	Stadium
Brigg Town	The Hawthorns
Campion	Scotchman Road
Dronfield Town	Stonelow Ground
Eccleshill United	Kings Way
AFC Emley	The Welfare Ground
Glasshoughton Welfare	Glasshoughton Centre
Grimsby Borough	Bradley Football Centre
Hall Road Rangers	Howarth Park
Hallam	Sandygate Road
Knaresborough Town	Manse Lane
Nostell Miners Welfare	The Welfare Ground
Ollerton Town	Walesby Lane
Penistone Church	Church View Road
Pontefract Collieries	Skinner Lane
Rossington Main	Welfare Ground
Selby Town	Richard Street
Shirebrook Town	Langwith Road
Teversal	Teversal Grange
Westella & Willerby	Euronics Ground (Note: home of Barton Town Old Boys (groundshare))
Winterton Rangers	West Street
Worsbrough Bridge Athletic	Park Road
Yorkshire Amateur	Bracken Edge

== League Cup ==
2016–17 Northern Counties East Football League League Cup
Tournament details
- Country: England
- Teams: 44

Final positions
- Champions: Penistone Church
- Runners-up: Bridlington Town

The 2016–17 Northern Counties East Football League Cup was the 35th season of the league cup competition of the Northern Counties East Football League.

=== First round ===
16 August 2016	Shirebrook Town	1–4	Rossington Main
				Attendance: 65

10 August 2016	Eccleshill United	3–1	Westella & Willerby
				Attendance: 29

10 August 2016	Ollerton Town	2–1	Worsbrough Bridge Athletic
				Attendance: 95

10 August 2016	AFC Emley	2–2 (a.e.t.) (4–3 p)	Pontefract Collieries
				Attendance: 122

10 August 2016	Winterton Rangers	4–1	Yorkshire Amateur
				Attendance: 37

10 August 2016	Brigg Town	3–4 (a.e.t.)	Glasshoughton Welfare
				Attendance: 73

=== Second round ===
9 August 2016	Dronfield Town	0–4	Worksop Town
				Attendance: 83

9 August 2016	Garforth Town	2–0	Grimsby Borough
				Attendance: 64

17 August 2016	Eccleshill United	1–4	Hall Road Rangers
				Attendance: 18

9 August 2016	Teversal	2–2 (a.e.t.) (3–2 p)	Athersley Recreation
				Attendance: 52

16 August 2016	Harrogate Railway Athletic	3–2 (a.e.t.)	Ollerton Town
				Attendance: 51

9 August 2016	Handsworth Parramore	4–0	Cleethorpes Town
				Attendance: 84

=== Third round ===
14 December 2016	AFC Emley	1–0	Worksop Town
				Attendance: 157

18 October 2016	Barton Town Old Boys	2–3	Teversal
				Attendance: 34

18 October 2016	Hall Road Rangers	0–2	Pickering Town
				Attendance: 77

20 September 2016	Garforth Town	1–3	Handsworth Parramore
				Attendance: 66

13 September 2016	Glasshoughton Welfare	3–1	Nostell Miners Welfare
				Attendance: 60

2 November 2016	Hallam	10–0	Winterton Rangers	Sandygate Road
				Attendance: 82

1 November 2016	Harrogate Railway Athletic	5–2	Campion
				Attendance: 58

18 October 2016	Hemsworth Miners Welfare	1–0	Parkgate
				Attendance: 73

1 November 2016	Knaresborough Town	2–1	Armthorpe Welfare
				Attendance: 70

25 October 2016	Liversedge	2–4 (a.e.t.)	Clipstone
				Attendance: 98

19 October 2016	Maltby Main	1–5	Staveley Miners Welfare
				Attendance: 56

4 October 2016	Rainworth Miners Welfare	7–3	Bottesford Town
				Attendance: 64

18 October 2016	Retford United	1–2	Penistone Church
				Attendance: 88

18 October 2016	Selby Town	2–1	Albion Sports
				Attendance: 85

1 November 2016	Rossington Main	0–3	AFC Mansfield
				Attendance: 69

18 October 2016	Thackley	1–2	Bridlington Town
				Attendance: 42

=== Fourth round ===
25 January 2017	AFC Mansfield	3–0	Knaresborough Town
				Attendance: 53

24 January 2017	Bridlington Town	3–1	Pickering Town
				Attendance: 164

24 January 2017	Handsworth Parramore	1–2 (a.e.t.)	Hallam
				Attendance: 86

24 January 2017	Harrogate Railway Athletic	3–1	Glasshoughton Welfare
				Attendance: 39
Note: Harrogate Railway Athletic removed from competition for fielding ineligible player - Glasshoughton Welfare reinstated.

24 January 2017	Hemsworth Miners Welfare	0–2	Rainworth Miners Welfare
				Attendance: 76

25 January 2017	Penistone Church	3–2 (a.e.t.)	Clipstone
				Attendance: 111

24 January 2017	Selby Town	2–4	AFC Emley
				Attendance: 125

24 January 2017	Teversal	3–1 (a.e.t.)	Staveley Miners Welfare
				Attendance: 67

=== Quarter-finals ===
7 March 2017	Bridlington Town	3–1 (a.e.t.)	AFC Mansfield
				Attendance: 107

1 March 2017	Hallam	1–3	Glasshoughton Welfare
				Attendance: 105

1 March 2017	Penistone Church	5–1	Teversal
				Attendance: 86

28 February 2017	Rainworth Miners Welfare	0–3	AFC Emley
				Attendance: 81

=== Semi-finals ===
18 April 2017	Bridlington Town	1–0	AFC Emley
				Attendance: 238

18 April 2017	Penistone Church	3–2	Glasshoughton Welfare
				Attendance: 242

=== Final ===
17 May 2017	Penistone Church	4–1	Bridlington Town	Bramall Lane, Sheffield
				Attendance: 485
