= Adam Drury (footballer, born 1993) =

English footballer

Personal information
- Full name: Adam John Drury
- Date of birth: 9 September 1993 (age 33)
- Place of birth: Grimsby, England
- Height: 1.79 m (5 ft 10 1/2 in)
- Positions: Winger; right-back

Team information
- Current team: Grimsby Borough
- Number: 7

Youth career
- –2007: Grimsby Town
- 2007–2011: Manchester City

Senior career*
Years	Team	Apps	(Gls)
2011–2015	Manchester City	0	(0)
2013	→ Burton Albion (loan)	13	(0)
2014–2015	→ St Mirren (loan)	12	(3)
2015	Bristol Rovers	0	(0)
2015	Gainsborough Trinity	7	(0)
2016–2020	Grimsby Borough	77	(11)
2020–2021	Gainsborough Trinity		
2021–	Grimsby Borough		
- * Club domestic league appearances and goals as of 16:00, 29 April 2017 (UTC)

Adam John Drury (born 9 September 1993) is an English footballer who plays for Grimsby Borough. He plays as a winger but can also play as a right back. Drury has previously played for Manchester City, Burton Albion and St Mirren, Bristol Rovers, Gainsborough Trinity and Grimsby Borough.

== Career ==
Drury was born in Grimsby and raised in Humberston where he attended Humberston Academy. He started his career at hometown club Grimsby Town in their youth system until the age of 12.

=== Manchester City ===
He was signed from Grimsby by Manchester City in 2007 aged 12; progressing from the youth team, he found his way into the reserve side and signed a professional contract in 2011. Drury played in the Manchester City U21s Development squad under the guidance of former player and France international Patrick Vieira.

==== Burton Albion (loan) ====
In January 2013 he joined League Two side Burton Albion on loan for a month. Drury made his debut for Burton Albion in the FA Cup 3rd round playing 73 minutes in a 2–0 away defeat against Leicester City at King Power Stadium. He made his League Two debut playing 71 minutes in a 2–1 win against Torquay United at Pirelli Stadium. Drurys second appearance came in a 1–0 away defeat against Northampton Town, where he played the full 90 minutes in the match.

On 31 January, he had his loan extended until the end of the season. Drury helped the club to the League Two play-offs, by beating 3–2 League Two champions Gillingham. His final appearance came in the 2012–13 play-off semi-final first leg against Bradford City at Valley Parade. Drury played 14 times for the Brewers in all competitions.

==== St Mirren (loan) ====
Drury had been training with Peterborough United with a view to signing a year-long deal, however, on 19 August 2014, it was announced that he would spend the next season on loan with St Mirren in the Scottish Premiership. He made his debut for the club on 23 August 2014, starting and playing 70 minutes in a 1–0 home defeat to Dundee. Drury scored his first league goal of the campaign in the fourth game for St Mirren, an equaliser in the 2–1 away defeat against Kilmarnock on 23 September 2014, stabbing the ball home from close range. He came off the bench in the 63rd minute to net the winning goal in the 2–1 away victory against St Johnstone on 4 October 2014 with three minutes remaining, a fierce finish after a defense splitting pass saw Drury into the penalty box.

On 5 January St Mirren announced that Drury had left the club, cutting short his one-year loan period from Manchester City. Drury played 16 times for Saints, scoring three goals.

=== Bristol Rovers ===
Having left Manchester City in the summer of 2015, Drury went on to have trials with both Leeds United and Bradford City but was not successful in earning a contract with either club. He was given a trial at Blackpool in July 2015, but also proved unsuccessful. On 1 September 2015, Drury signed for Bristol Rovers on a non-contract basis. Drury left the club after only a week without playing for them. He cited "personal reasons" for leaving.

=== Gainsborough Trinity ===
Drury spent a few weeks at National League side Lincoln City in October 2015, the trial being unsuccessful. He then spent a few days on trial at Rotherham United before signing non-contractual (dual registration) terms for National League North side Gainsborough Trinity on 4 November 2015. He made his full home debut four days later, a 1–0 defeat in the FA Cup first round against Shrewsbury Town. On 30 December 2015, Drury left the club by mutual agreement.

=== Grimsby Borough ===
Drury signed for NCEL Division One side Grimsby Borough in February 2016 back in his home town. He started off playing in the team out of position as a striker, due to a lack of players in that position. He scored two goals on his debut for the club in a 5–3 away defeat at Yorkshire Amateur on 23 February 2016. On 22 March 2016, he scored an equalising goal on 60 minutes in a 1–2 home defeat over Tadcaster Albion in the Northern Counties East League Cup. Drury finished the 2015–16 campaign off moving from right-wing to right-back, his more natural position, making 5 appearances, scoring three goals and providing two assists, he was instrumental in the club's survival from relegation; he signed a new one-year contract with the club in July 2016.

Drury started the 2016–17 season at right-back, he provided two assists in the 3–2 home victory over Ollerton Town on 6 August 2016, his performance that day awarding him man of the match. He scored a brace in the following league match in a 3–2 defeat at Eccleshill United on 13 August 2016 with another man of the match awarding performance. He scored his first career hat-trick in a 5–2 home victory against Hall Road Rangers on 8 October 2016. Drury helped his team reach the promotion play-offs where he scored the winning goal against Hallam in the 3–2 home win of the NCEL Division One play-off semi-final on 26 April 2017. His final goal of the season came in the NCEL Division One play-off final against Penistone Church, the game finishing in a 4–2 defeat.

==== Gainsborough Trinity and return to Grimsby Borough ====
On 10 May 2020 it was confirmed, that Drury had returned to his former club, Gainsborough Trinity. However, it seemed that he returned to Grimsby Borough again ahead of the 2021–22 season.

== Style of play ==
Comfortable as either a winger or as a right back, Drury is described as a "pacey and intelligent dribbler".

== Career statistics ==
As of match played 29 April 2017.

Appearances and goals by club, season and competition
Club	Season	League			National Cup (Note: Cup competitions include the Scottish Cup and FA Cup)		League Cup (Note: League Cup competitions include the Scottish League Cup and Football League Cup)		Other		Total	
Club	Season	Division	Apps	Goals	Apps	Goals	Apps	Goals	Apps	Goals	Apps	Goals
Manchester City	2012–13	Premier League	0	0	0	0	0	0	0	0	0	0
Manchester City	2013–14	Premier League	0	0	0	0	0	0	0	0	0	0
Manchester City	2014–15	Premier League	0	0	0	0	0	0	0	0	0	0
Manchester City	Total		0	0	0	0	0	0	0	0	0	0
Burton Albion (loan)	2012–13	League Two	12	0	1	0	0	0	1 (Note: One appearance in League Two play-offs)	0	14	0
St Mirren (loan)	2014–15	Scottish Premier League	12	3	2	0	2	0	0	0	16	3
Bristol Rovers	2015–16	League Two	0	0	0	0	0	0	0	0	0	0
Gainsborough Trinity	2015–16	National League North	7	0	1	0	0	0	0	0	8	0
Grimsby Borough	2015–16	NCEL Division One	4	2	0	0	0	0	1 (Note: One appearance and one goal in Northern Counties East League Cup)	1	5	3
Grimsby Borough	2016–17	NCEL Division One	41	9	0	0	0	0	5 (Note: Two appearances in FA Vase, one appearance in Northern Counties East League Cup, two appearances and two goals in NCEL Division One play-offs)	2	46	11
Grimsby Borough	Total		45	11	0	0	0	0	6	3	51	14
Career total			76	14	4	0	2	0	7	3	89	17
