= 2018–19 Northern Premier League =

The 2018–19 season was the 51st season of the Northern Premier League. After eleven seasons, the two divisions of Division One were re-aligned from North and South to West and East. The League sponsors for the last time were Evo-Stik.

== Premier Division ==
Northern Premier League Premier Division
- Season: 2018–19
- Champions: Farsley Celtic
- Promoted: Farsley Celtic
- Relegated: Workington; Marine

=== Team changes ===
The following 9 clubs left the Premier Division before the season -

- Altrincham – promoted to National League North
- Ashton United – promoted to National League North
- Barwell – transferred to Southern League Premier Division Central
- Coalville Town – transferred to Southern League Premier Division Central
- Halesowen Town – transferred to Southern League Premier Division Central
- Rushall Olympic – transferred to Southern League Premier Division Central
- Stourbridge – transferred to Southern League Premier Division Central
- Sutton Coldfield Town – relegated to Southern League Division One Central
- Shaw Lane – folded during the off season

The following 7 clubs joined the Premier Division before the season -

- Bamber Bridge – promoted from NPL Division One North
- Basford United – promoted from NPL Division One South
- Gainsborough Trinity – relegated from National League North
- Hyde United – promoted from NPL Division One North
- North Ferriby United – relegated from National League North
- Scarborough Athletic – promoted from NPL Division One North
- South Shields – promoted from NPL Division One North

=== League table ===
Pos	Team	Pld	W	D	L	GF	GA	GD	Pts	Promotion, qualification or relegation
1	Farsley Celtic (C, P)	40	28	6	6	82	40	+42	90	Promoted to the National League North
2	South Shields	40	27	6	7	86	41	+45	87	Qualified for the play-offs (Note: Four teams played for one spot in the super playoff final against playoff winners from Southern Football League. Super playoff final winners were to be promoted to the National League North.)
3	Warrington Town (O)	40	25	9	6	69	33	+36	84	Qualified for the play-offs
4	Nantwich Town	40	19	12	9	70	59	+11	69	Qualified for the play-offs
5	Buxton	40	18	12	10	60	45	+15	66	Qualified for the play-offs
6	Gainsborough Trinity	40	19	8	13	53	41	+12	65	
7	Basford United	40	18	7	15	82	67	+15	61	
8	Scarborough Athletic	40	18	7	15	70	56	+14	61	
9	Witton Albion	40	16	10	14	45	41	+4	58	
10	Hyde United	40	15	8	17	58	53	+5	53	
11	Whitby Town	40	15	4	21	48	59	−11	49	
12	Lancaster City	40	12	13	15	42	61	−19	49	
13	Hednesford Town	40	13	9	18	51	63	−12	48	Transferred to the Southern League Premier Division Central
14	Stafford Rangers	40	11	14	15	62	70	−8	47	
15	Matlock Town	40	12	8	20	58	79	−21	44	
16	Bamber Bridge	40	10	12	18	62	67	−5	42	
17	Stalybridge Celtic	40	11	9	20	46	62	−16	42	
18	Grantham Town	40	12	6	22	39	72	−33	42	
19	Mickleover Sports	40	10	11	19	37	61	−24	41	
20	Marine (R)	40	10	10	20	39	54	−15	40	Relegated to NPL Division One North West
21	Workington (R)	40	8	5	27	38	73	−35	29	Relegated to NPL Division One North West
22	North Ferriby United	0	0	0	0	0	0	0	0	Club folded; record expunged. A new North Ferriby in NCEFL Division One

Updated to match(es) played on 27 April 2019. Source: NPL official site
Rules for classification: 1) Points; 2) Goal difference; 3) Number of goals scored; 4) Number of matches won; 5) Head-to-head results
(C) Champions; (O) Play-off winners; (P) Promoted; (R) Relegated

=== Top 10 goalscorers ===
Rank	Player	Club	Goals
1	(England) Alistair Waddecar	Bamber Bridge	25
1	(England) James Walshaw	Scarborough Athletic	25
3	(England) Jimmy Spencer	Farsley Celtic	20
4	(England) Nathan Watson	Basford United	19
5	(England) Michael Coulson	Scarborough Athletic	18
6	(England) Liam Hardy	Buxton	16
6	(England) Ashley Worsfold	Gainsborough Trinity	16
8	(England) Robert Briggs	South Shields	15
9	(England) Nathan Cartman	Farsley Celtic	13
9	(Republic of Ireland) Will Hayhurst	Farsley Celtic	13
9	(England) Lee Mason	South Shields	13

=== Results table ===
Home \ Away	BAM	BAS	BUX	FAR	GAI	GRN	HED	HYD	LNC	MAR	MAT	MIC	NAN	NFU	SCA	SSH	STA	STL	WAR	WTB	WTN	WRK
Bamber Bridge		0–4	2–2	0–3	1–2	3–1	1–1	5–2	2–2	1–2	4–2	1–2	2–2		2–4	0–2	6–1	3–0	0–0	1–3	2–0	3–2
Basford United	1–0		2–0	4–3	0–1	3–1	1–2	3–8	3–1	0–0	6–0	2–1	7–3		3–1	0–3	2–2	5–2	2–3	2–0	3–1	3–2
Buxton	0–1	1–0		1–2	1–0	1–0	1–2	1–0	1–2	0–3	2–2	5–0	2–1		1–0	2–0	4–1	1–1	2–2	2–0	0–5	3–2
Farsley Celtic	3–2	2–0	1–1		1–1	1–1	1–2	1–1	2–0	2–0	3–2	1–0	2–1		3–1	4–1	2–1	2–1	3–3	3–1	0–1	2–0
Gainsborough Trinity	2–1	3–2	1–2	0–5		2–3	0–0	1–0	3–1	0–1	4–2	2–0	0–0		0–1	0–1	1–1	1–0	1–4	4–1	1–1	4–1
Grantham Town	1–1	2–1	0–1	0–4	0–2		1–2	1–0	0–2	1–1	2–0	2–1	2–3		1–0	2–1	0–5	0–1	0–2	3–2	1–0	0–2
Hednesford Town	1–1	3–1	1–1	0–1	1–2	2–1		1–0	0–1	0–1	2–0	1–1	4–4		0–1	2–1	1–3	1–0	1–0	1–2	0–1	2–0
Hyde United	0–2	1–0	1–1	1–2	1–3	3–0	2–0		1–2	1–2	1–2	2–1	1–2		2–3	4–1	5–3	1–0	0–2	3–0	1–0	0–0
Lancaster City	1–1	1–1	1–3	2–0	0–1	1–1	2–2	2–1		0–1	1–0	2–2	0–2		0–6	1–1	0–0	1–0	1–3	2–1	1–0	0–2
Marine	0–2	1–4	1–1	1–2	1–1	0–2	3–1	0–0	3–1		1–3	3–0	0–1		1–2	1–3	1–0	1–1	0–2	0–0	2–3	0–2
Matlock Town	2–1	2–2	0–6	1–2	0–2	7–0	3–3	0–0	4–0	3–1		1–1	0–1		0–0	0–3	3–2	3–1	0–2	0–3	1–2	2–1
Mickleover Sports	2–2	0–1	1–3	1–2	0–1	1–3	1–0	0–2	1–1	1–0	0–0		0–0		1–1	1–3	3–2	2–1	1–4	0–1	0–0	1–0
Nantwich Town	2–0	3–2	0–0	2–1	1–0	1–1	2–1	1–1	5–2	3–2	1–4	2–3			1–1	0–0	0–1	4–2	2–1	4–1	0–1	0–0
North Ferriby United																						
Scarborough Athletic	0–0	3–1	4–0	1–3	0–2	2–0	5–3	0–2	1–1	2–0	2–2	0–2	2–3			1–3	4–1	1–2	1–0	1–1	2–0	5–1
South Shields	3–3	1–1	1–1	1–0	1–0	5–0	4–1	4–0	2–0	2–1	5–0	3–2	4–0		3–2		3–0	3–2	1–2	5–2	2–1	4–1
Stafford Rangers	1–0	3–1	0–1	1–3	1–1	1–1	4–1	1–3	1–1	0–0	4–1	1–1	1–4		1–3	1–1		2–0	1–1	3–3	3–1	1–1
Stalybridge Celtic	3–2	0–2	1–1	2–2	2–1	1–0	1–0	2–2	1–2	3–2	3–1	0–0	1–1		2–3	0–1	2–2		1–2	0–1	0–2	1–0
Warrington Town	2–0	1–1	2–1	0–2	2–1	3–0	3–1	2–1	1–1	1–0	0–1	1–0	0–1		2–0	3–0	2–3	0–0		1–0	0–0	2–0
Whitby Town	2–1	4–1	1–0	0–2	1–0	2–1	1–2	0–1	1–1	2–1	1–3	4–0	0–1		2–0	0–1	1–2	2–1	0–1		0–1	0–1
Witton Albion	2–2	2–2	0–3	2–3	0–0	1–0	1–1	1–1	1–0	0–0	1–0	1–2	2–0		2–1	0–1	1–1	1–3	1–2	2–0		2–0
Workington	2–1	0–3	1–1	0–1	0–2	1–4	4–2	1–2	0–2	1–1	3–1	0–1	2–4		2–3	0–2	1–0	1–2	0–2	1–2	0–2	

Legend: Blue = home team win; Yellow = draw; Red = away team win.

=== Play-offs ===
Semi-finals
2	South Shields	4
5	Buxton	2
3	Warrington Town	4
4	Nantwich Town	1

Final
2	South Shields	1
3	Warrington Town	2

Super final
3	Warrington Town	2
SFL	King's Lynn Town (a.e.t.)	3

==== Semi-finals ====
30 April	South Shields	4–2	Buxton	South Shields
	Shaw 46'; Finnigan 47', 71'; Gillies 89'		De Girolamo 29'; Young 65'	Stadium: Mariners Park; Attendance: 1,878

30 April	Warrington Town	4–1	Nantwich Town	Warrington
	Garrity 57', 80'; Allinson 89' (o.g.); Gray 90'		Saunders 28'	Stadium: Cantilever Park; Attendance: 1,424

==== Final ====
4 May	South Shields	1–2	Warrington Town	South Shields
	Gillies 30'		Vassallo 67'; Amis 87'	Stadium: Mariners Park; Attendance: 2,337

==== Super final ====
11 May	Warrington Town	2–3 (a.e.t.)	King's Lynn Town	Warrington
	Garrity 18', 60'		Richards 15'; Marriott 85' (pen.); Gash 115'	Stadium: Cantilever Park; Attendance: 2,200

=== Stadia and locations ===
Locations of the 2018–19 Premier Division clubs

Club	Ground	Capacity
Bamber Bridge	Irongate	2,264
Basford United	Greenwich Avenue	2,200
Buxton	The Silverlands	5,200
Farsley Celtic	Throstle Nest	3,900
Gainsborough Trinity	The Northolme	4,304
Grantham Town	South Kesteven Sports Stadium	7,500
Hednesford Town	Keys Park	6,039
Hyde United	Ewen Fields	4,250
Lancaster City	Giant Axe	3,500
Marine	Marine Travel Arena	3,185
Matlock Town	Causeway Lane	2,214
Mickleover Sports	Station Road	2,000
Nantwich Town	The Weaver Stadium	3,500
North Ferriby United	Grange Lane	2,200
Scarborough Athletic	Flamingo Land Stadium	2,070
South Shields	Mariners Park	3,500
Stafford Rangers	Marston Road	4,000
Stalybridge Celtic	Bower Fold	6,500
Warrington Town	Cantilever Park	3,500
Whitby Town	Turnbull Ground	3,500
Witton Albion	Wincham Park	4,813
Workington	Borough Park	3,101

== Division One West ==
Northern Premier League Division One West
- Season: 2018–19
- Champions: Atherton Collieries
- Promoted: Atherton Collieries
- Relegated: Skelmersdale United

=== Team changes ===
The following 9 clubs left Division One North before the season -

- Bamber Bridge – promoted to NPL Premier Division
- Brighouse Town – transferred to NPL Division One East
- Goole – relegated to Northern Counties East League Premier Division
- Hyde United – promoted to NPL Premier Division
- Ossett Albion – merged with Ossett Town into Ossett United and transferred to NPL Division One East
- Ossett Town – merged with Ossett Albion into Ossett United and transferred to NPL Division One East
- Scarborough Athletic – promoted to NPL Premier Division
- South Shields – promoted to NPL Premier Division
- Tadcaster Albion – transferred to NPL Division One East

The following 7 clubs joined Division One West before the season -

- Chasetown – transferred from NPL Division One South
- Kidsgrove Athletic – transferred from NPL Division One South
- Leek Town – transferred from NPL Division One South
- Market Drayton Town – transferred from NPL Division One South
- Newcastle Town – transferred from NPL Division One South
- Runcorn Linnets – promoted from North West Counties League Premier Division
- Widnes – promoted from North West Counties League Premier Division

=== League table ===
Pos	Team	Pld	W	D	L	GF	GA	GD	Pts	Promotion, qualification or relegation
1	Atherton Collieries (C, P)	38	26	4	8	89	34	+55	82	Promoted to the NPL Premier Division
2	Radcliffe (O, P)	38	23	6	9	73	34	+39	75	Qualified for the play-offs, then promoted to the NPL Premier Division
3	Leek Town	38	22	8	8	78	34	+44	74	Qualified for the play-offs, then transferred to the NPL Division One South East
4	Colne	38	22	7	9	71	44	+27	73	Qualified for the play-offs (Note: Four teams played for one spot and possible promotion to Level 7. Five of seven level 8 play-off winners highest by points were to be promoted.)
5	Ramsbottom United	38	21	9	8	78	41	+37	72	Qualified for the play-offs
6	Runcorn Linnets	38	22	6	10	69	50	+19	72	
7	Prescot Cables	38	21	6	11	84	54	+30	69	
8	Mossley	38	19	8	11	66	51	+15	65	
9	Trafford	38	17	10	11	53	44	+9	61	
10	Kidsgrove Athletic	38	15	13	10	58	40	+18	58	Transferred to the NPL Division One South East
11	Colwyn Bay	38	15	7	16	73	66	+7	52 (Note: Colwyn Bay resigned from the league at the end of the season and transferred to the Welsh football league system)	Transferred to (Wales) Cymru North
12	Widnes	38	15	6	17	60	61	−1	51	
13	Chasetown	38	12	10	16	61	63	−2	46	Transferred to the NPL Division One South East
14	Droylsden	38	12	7	19	61	72	−11	43	
15	Newcastle Town	38	10	10	18	52	74	−22	40	Transferred to the NPL Division One South East
16	Market Drayton Town	38	11	7	20	55	94	−39	40	Transferred to the NPL Division One South East
17	Glossop North End	38	7	10	21	41	74	−33	31	Transferred to the NPL Division One South East
18	Clitheroe	38	7	7	24	45	88	−43	28	
19	Kendal Town	38	5	4	29	32	94	−62	19 (Note: Colwyn Bay were transferred to the Welsh football league system. Because of this Kendal Town were reprieved from relegation.)	
20	Skelmersdale United (R)	38	2	7	29	24	111	−87	13	Relegated to the NWCFL Premier Division

Updated to match(es) played on 27 April 2019. Source: NPL official site
Rules for classification: 1) Points; 2) Goal difference; 3) Number of goals scored; 4) Number of matches won; 5) Head-to-head results
(C) Champions; (O) Play-off winners; (P) Promoted; (R) Relegated

=== Top 10 goalscorers ===
Rank	Player	Club	Goals
1	(England) Chris Almond	Prescot Cables	25
2	(England) Sefton Gonzales	Droylsden	22
2	(England) Jamie Rainford	Ramsbottom United	22
4	(England) Anthony Malbon	Kidsgrove Athletic	21
4	(Belgium) Tunde Owolabi	Radcliffe	21
6	(England) Tom Bentham	Atherton Collieries	19
6	(England) Alex Curran	Colne	19
6	(England) Max Leonard	Mossley	19
9	(England) Ben Wharton	Radcliffe	18
10	(England) Nic Evangelinos	Ramsbottom United	17

=== Results table ===
Home \ Away	ACO	CHA	CLT	CLN	COL	DRO	GNE	KEN	KID	LEE	MAR	MOS	NEW	PRC	RAD	RAM	RNL	SKU	TRA	WID
Atherton Collieries		2–0	4–0	2–4	0–2	2–0	2–1	8–0	2–1	2–1	1–2	6–2	4–1	4–1	0–1	1–3	3–2	9–1	0–0	0–1
Chasetown	0–1		1–1	1–1	1–1	1–0	2–2	5–0	2–2	1–1	0–2	1–3	5–0	1–4	2–0	2–2	1–2	2–2	0–2	3–1
Clitheroe	3–5	0–3		1–3	0–2	5–1	2–0	1–3	0–4	0–1	2–3	1–1	1–1	1–2	0–7	1–2	0–5	2–1	1–2	2–3
Colne	2–1	3–1	3–0		3–2	1–0	0–1	3–1	1–3	3–2	8–1	1–2	2–2	0–1	1–0	1–0	1–6	1–0	0–1	1–0
Colwyn Bay	1–2	4–2	1–1	2–5		1–2	2–1	1–0	1–2	0–1	4–1	1–5	3–3	2–2	1–2	0–1	0–1	9–0	2–1	2–4
Droylsden	0–0	2–4	1–0	1–1	1–2		1–1	2–1	0–3	2–3	0–2	0–3	3–1	2–3	0–2	2–3	4–2	3–1	1–2	6–2
Glossop North End	0–2	1–2	0–2	1–4	0–5	1–1		1–4	1–2	0–2	2–0	3–3	3–1	0–0	1–3	0–5	0–2	0–0	0–0	3–6
Kendal Town	0–4	0–1	2–2	1–4	1–3	1–4	1–3		1–2	2–3	3–2	0–1	0–1	0–3	0–4	2–2	1–2	1–0	0–2	1–5
Kidsgrove Athletic	0–1	1–1	3–0	0–1	0–2	3–3	1–1	0–0		2–1	2–2	4–0	1–0	0–4	0–1	0–2	5–0	4–0	1–0	1–1
Leek Town	0–1	1–1	1–2	0–0	2–2	1–1	3–1	3–0	1–2		4–0	3–1	4–1	4–0	2–1	4–0	1–1	6–0	1–3	4–1
Market Drayton Town	0–2	2–1	3–0	0–4	1–4	3–1	2–2	2–4	1–1	1–1		1–1	2–1	4–4	2–1	1–3	3–2	2–1	1–4	0–2
Mossley	0–2	3–1	2–0	0–0	3–2	1–0	1–3	2–0	0–0	0–2	5–1		1–0	2–1	1–1	1–1	1–2	1–0	1–0	2–1
Newcastle Town	0–2	3–1	2–1	1–2	3–4	1–3	1–0	5–0	1–1	0–1	6–2	1–0		2–3	1–1	0–6	1–2	1–1	3–3	2–1
Prescot Cables	1–1	6–1	4–1	3–1	1–2	4–2	3–1	1–1	2–1	0–1	3–0	2–1	4–0		1–1	0–4	2–1	5–0	2–0	2–1
Radcliffe	2–0	2–1	4–1	1–1	3–0	2–1	1–2	2–0	1–0	1–3	2–1	3–4	4–0	3–2		0–0	1–0	0–2	3–0	3–1
Ramsbottom United	0–3	2–2	3–3	1–3	1–0	4–0	2–0	1–0	2–2	1–1	2–1	2–1	1–2	2–0	2–1		2–3	6–0	0–1	0–1
Runcorn Linnets	0–3	2–1	2–1	2–0	4–0	0–4	2–2	3–0	2–1	1–0	4–1	2–2	1–1	2–1	0–0	1–2		2–1	2–1	0–2
Skelmersdale United	0–3	0–2	1–4	1–2	0–0	1–2	0–3	1–0	2–2	0–4	1–1	1–5	0–0	1–5	1–2	0–3	1–3		1–6	0–1
Trafford	1–1	3–0	1–1	0–0	0–0	3–4	2–0	2–0	0–0	0–3	3–2	1–0	0–2	2–1	0–5	0–4	0–0	5–1		1–1
Widnes	1–2	0–3	1–2	3–2	2–2	1–1	2–0	3–1	0–1	0–2	3–0	1–4	1–1	2–1	0–2	1–1	0–1	4–1	0–1	

Source: EvoStik Results Grid
Legend: Blue = home team win; Yellow = draw; Red = away team win.

=== Play-offs ===
Semifinals
2	Radcliffe	3
5	Ramsbottom United	0
3	Leek Town (a.e.t.)	2
4	Colne	1

Final
2	Radcliffe	2
3	Leek Town	1

Semi-finals

30 April	Radcliffe	3–0	Ramsbottom United	Radcliffe
	Metcalfe 40'; Owolabi 55'; Wharton 77'			Stadium: Stainton Park; Attendance: 736

1 May	Leek Town	2–1	Colne	Leek
	Stevenson 14'; Grice 119'		Webb-Foster 34'	Stadium: Harrison Park; Attendance: 1,047

Final

4 May	Radcliffe	2–1	Leek Town	Radcliffe
	Owolabi 46'; Wharton 63' (pen.)		Stevenson 37'	Stadium: Stainton Park; Attendance: 1,141

=== Stadia and locations ===
Locations of
Northern Premier
League 2018–19
Division One
West teams

Team	Stadium	Capacity
Atherton Collieries	Alder Street	2,500
Chasetown	The Scholars Ground	2,000
Clitheroe	Shawbridge	2,000
Colne	Holt House	1,800
Colwyn Bay	(Wales) Llanelian Road	2,500
Droylsden	Butcher's Arms Ground	3,000
Glossop North End	The Arthur Goldthorpe Stadium	1,350
Kendal Town	Parkside Road	2,400
Kidsgrove Athletic	The Seddon Stadium	2,000
Leek Town	Harrison Park	3,600
Market Drayton Town	Greenfields Sports Ground	1,000
Mossley	Seel Park	4,000
Newcastle Town	Lyme Valley Stadium	4,000
Prescot Cables	Valerie Park	3,200
Radcliffe	Stainton Park	3,500
Ramsbottom United	The Harry Williams Riverside	2,000
Runcorn Linnets	Millbank Linnets Stadium	1,600
Skelmersdale United	Valerie Park	3,200
Trafford	Shawe View	2,500
Widnes	Select Security Stadium	13,350

== Division One East ==
Northern Premier League Division One East
- Season: 2018–19
- Champions: Morpeth Town
- Promoted: Morpeth Town
- Relegated: Gresley

=== Team changes ===
The following 11 clubs left Division One South before the season -

- Alvechurch – promoted to Southern League Premier Division Central
- Basford United – promoted to NPL Premier Division
- Bedworth United – promoted to Southern League Premier Division Central
- Chasetown – transferred to NPL Division One West
- Corby Town – transferred to Southern League Division One Central
- Kidsgrove Athletic – transferred to NPL Division One West
- Leek Town – transferred to NPL Division One West
- Market Drayton Town – transferred to NPL Division One West
- Newcastle Town – transferred to NPL Division One West
- Peterborough Sports – transferred to Southern League Division One Central
- Romulus – relegated to Midland League Premier Division

The following 9 clubs joined Division One East before the season -

- AFC Mansfield – promoted from Northern Counties East League Premier Division
- Brighouse Town – transferred from NPL Division One North
- Marske United – promoted from Northern League Division One
- Morpeth Town – promoted from Northern League Division One
- Ossett United – new club, merger of Ossett Albion and Ossett Town; transferred from NPL Division One North
- Pickering Town – promoted from Northern Counties East League Premier Division
- Pontefract Collieries – promoted from Northern Counties East League Premier Division
- Tadcaster Albion – transferred from NPL Division One North
- Wisbech Town – promoted from United Counties League Premier Division

=== League table ===
Pos	Team	Pld	W	D	L	GF	GA	GD	Pts	Promotion, qualification or relegation
1	Morpeth Town (C, P)	38	28	4	6	90	33	+57	88	Promoted to the NPL Premier Division
2	Pontefract Collieries	38	23	7	8	91	54	+37	76	Qualified for the play-offs, then transferred to the NPL Division One North West
3	Brighouse Town (O)	38	21	8	9	74	43	+31	71	Qualified for the play-offs, then transferred to the NPL Division One North West
4	Sheffield	38	21	6	11	81	63	+18	69	Qualified for the play-offs (Note: Four teams played for one spot and possible promotion to Level 7. Five of seven level 8 play-off winners highest by points were to be promoted.)
5	Ossett United	38	18	13	7	65	37	+28	67	Qualified for the play-offs, then transferred to the NPL Division One North West
6	Tadcaster Albion	38	20	6	12	71	47	+24	66	Transferred to the NPL Division One North West
7	Cleethorpes Town	38	18	10	10	90	62	+28	64	
8	Loughborough Dynamo	38	19	5	14	82	67	+15	62	
9	Belper Town	38	16	11	11	66	60	+6	59	
10	Marske United	38	16	10	12	63	47	+16	58	Transferred to the NPL Division One North West
11	Stamford	38	13	11	14	55	57	−2	50	
12	Frickley Athletic	38	13	9	16	54	60	−6	48	
13	Stocksbridge Park Steels	38	12	7	19	41	70	−29	43	
14	Lincoln United	38	12	7	19	53	83	−30	43	
15	AFC Mansfield	38	11	9	18	55	73	−18	42 (Note: AFC Mansfield will be demoted from Step 4 after their ground failed grading regulations)	Demoted to the NCEFL Premier Division
16	Pickering Town	38	8	11	19	45	72	−27	35	Transferred to the NPL Division One North West
17	Wisbech Town	38	6	13	19	43	70	−27	31	
18	Spalding United	38	6	13	19	38	67	−29	31	
19	Carlton Town	38	7	6	25	46	84	−38	27 (Note: AFC Mansfield were demoted from Step 4. Because of this Carlton Town were reprieved from relegation.)	
20	Gresley (R)	38	7	4	27	37	91	−54	25	Relegated to the MFL Premier Division

Updated to match(es) played on 27 April 2019. Source: NPL official site
Rules for classification: 1) Points; 2) Goal difference; 3) Number of goals scored; 4) Number of matches won; 5) Head-to-head results
(C) Champions; (O) Play-off winners; (P) Promoted; (R) Relegated

=== Top 10 goalscorers ===
Rank	Player	Club	Goals
1	(England) Aaron Martin	Brighouse Town	25
2	(England) Eli Hey	Pontefract Collieries	22
3	(England) Marc Newsham	Sheffield	21
3	(Saint Kitts and Nevis) Ryan Robbins	Loughborough Dynamo	21
3	(England) Scott Vernon	Cleethorpes Town	21
6	(England) Karl Demidh	Loughborough Dynamo	20
6	(Saint Kitts and Nevis) Jacob Hazel	Frickley Athletic	20
6	(England) Joe Lumsden	Tadcaster Albion	20
6	(England) Jamie Owens	Marske United	20
10	(England) Ryan Blott	Pickering Town	15
10	(England) Mitchell Dunne	Sheffield	15
10	(England) Brody Robertson	Cleethorpes Town	15

=== Results table ===
Home \ Away	AFM	BLP	BRT	CAR	CLE	FRK	GRE	LIN	LOU	MAR	MOR	OSU	PIC	PON	SHE	SPA	STM	STO	TAD	WIS
A.F.C. Mansfield		2–3	0–1	4–3	0–3	2–1	2–1	1–4	3–0	0–0	3–1	1–1	2–1	0–1	2–3	1–2	0–4	1–2	0–0	2–2
Belper Town	2–0		1–3	2–1	1–5	1–1	2–3	2–2	2–1	2–2	1–0	3–2	1–2	3–2	1–1	0–0	1–1	4–1	1–3	1–1
Brighouse Town	3–0	2–0		4–0	2–2	1–0	2–0	4–1	3–1	1–0	2–3	2–2	3–3	0–1	1–2	3–1	3–3	1–0	3–0	0–0
Carlton Town	0–2	1–3	1–2		1–5	1–2	5–0	3–1	2–3	2–2	0–1	1–1	1–2	2–6	0–1	1–2	0–4	1–1	0–1	0–1
Cleethorpes Town	3–3	0–1	1–1	4–2		1–2	3–0	4–1	3–3	0–1	2–1	1–1	2–1	4–2	3–4	1–1	6–0	6–2	1–5	3–1
Frickley Athletic	2–3	0–2	0–3	6–0	1–1		1–1	1–1	3–2	2–1	0–2	1–3	1–1	2–3	2–3	2–1	4–1	2–0	1–3	1–1
Gresley	0–3	1–5	0–1	0–1	2–3	1–0		2–1	1–2	0–1	0–3	0–5	1–2	0–4	0–3	0–1	2–1	3–3	2–1	2–2
Lincoln United	1–3	5–2	0–4	1–1	1–4	1–0	1–0		2–2	3–2	0–4	0–1	1–2	2–1	1–1	2–1	2–2	2–1	0–2	4–1
Loughborough Dynamo	4–1	2–0	5–2	2–1	1–0	2–0	4–1	5–1		0–4	2–1	1–3	4–2	3–3	6–0	2–2	1–0	5–1	1–2	1–3
Marske United	3–1	2–2	0–3	4–0	3–1	0–1	4–1	5–0	1–2		1–4	0–0	2–0	1–1	4–0	1–1	2–1	1–0	2–1	2–1
Morpeth Town	8–3	1–1	2–1	4–0	2–4	1–2	5–1	1–0	4–1	3–1		1–0	4–1	3–1	2–0	3–0	1–0	2–1	1–0	5–2
Ossett United	1–1	3–3	4–0	1–1	4–0	4–3	1–0	0–1	1–1	4–0	0–1		2–2	1–1	1–0	1–1	1–0	3–0	2–1	4–0
Pickering Town	1–3	0–3	0–2	0–2	0–2	4–4	2–3	1–2	1–5	1–0	1–1	0–1		0–1	1–5	1–1	3–3	0–2	1–1	2–0
Pontefract Collieries	3–2	4–2	2–1	4–2	3–0	2–2	3–0	3–0	3–0	1–1	1–1	1–0	2–1		3–0	3–0	1–2	2–0	1–2	4–0
Sheffield	2–0	0–0	1–2	4–2	2–1	1–2	4–1	2–1	4–0	3–3	0–0	3–0	3–1	5–3		2–1	2–0	2–1	3–4	5–1
Spalding United	1–1	2–1	0–3	2–2	1–2	0–1	2–2	0–3	0–2	0–2	0–4	1–2	0–0	7–3	2–1		2–2	0–1	0–1	1–2
Stamford	2–0	1–2	3–2	0–2	4–4	0–0	2–1	2–0	1–0	0–3	1–2	0–2	0–0	1–1	2–2	4–0		1–0	2–0	0–0
Stocksbridge Park Steels	2–1	0–2	1–0	1–0	0–3	2–0	3–2	3–0	3–2	0–0	0–4	1–1	0–1	0–5	3–2	1–1	2–4		0–3	1–0
Tadcaster Albion	1–1	2–1	2–2	0–2	1–1	4–0	2–1	8–3	1–0	2–1	0–3	0–1	0–1	2–3	3–4	3–0	3–0	1–1		2–0
Wisbech Town	1–1	1–2	1–1	1–2	1–1	0–1	1–2	2–2	2–4	3–1	0–1	4–1	1–1	1–2	3–1	1–1	0–1	1–1	1–4	

Source: NPL First Division East results grid
Legend: Blue = home team win; Yellow = draw; Red = away team win.

=== Play-offs ===
Semifinals
2	Pontefract Collieries (a.e.t.)	3
5	Ossett United	1
3	Brighouse Town	3
4	Sheffield	1

Final
2	Pontefract Collieries	0
3	Brighouse Town	3

Semi-finals

30 April	Pontefract Collieries	3–1	Ossett United	Pontefract
	Redford 69' (pen.); Dunn 111'; J. Williams 116'		Greaves 22'	Stadium: Harratt Nissan Stadium; Attendance: 486

30 April	Brighouse Town	3–1	Sheffield	Brighouse
	T. Williams 31'; Martin 45'; Johnson 81'		Newsham 23'	Stadium: St Giles Road; Attendance: 489

Final

4 May	Pontefract Collieries	0–3	Brighouse Town	Pontefract
			Martin 32'; Heeley 46'; Johnson 56'	Stadium: Harratt Nissan Stadium; Attendance: 836

=== Stadia and locations ===
Locations of Northern Premier League 2018–19 Division One East teams

Team	Stadium	Capacity
AFC Mansfield	Forest Town Arena	1,500
Belper Town	Christchurch Meadow	2,650
Brighouse Town	St Giles Road	1,000
Carlton Town	Bill Stokeld Stadium	1,500
Cleethorpes Town	Bradley Football Centre	1,000
Frickley Athletic	Westfield Lane	2,087
Gresley	Moat Ground	2,400
Lincoln United	Ashby Avenue	2,200
Loughborough Dynamo	Nanpantan Sports Ground	1,500
Marske United	Mount Pleasant	2,500
Morpeth Town	Craik Park	1,500
Ossett United	Ingfield	1,950
Pickering Town	Mill Lane	2,000
Pontefract Collieries	Harratt Nissan Stadium	1,200
Sheffield	Coach and Horses Ground	2,089
Spalding United	Sir Halley Stewart Field	3,500
Stamford	Borderville Sports Centre	2,000
Stocksbridge Park Steels	Bracken Moor	3,500
Tadcaster Albion	Ings Lane	2,000
Wisbech Town	Fenland Stadium	1,118

== Step 4 play-off winners rating ==
Club	League	PPG	GD	Qualification
Bromsgrove Sporting	Southern Football League Division One Central	2.29	64	Promoted to Step 3
Horsham	Isthmian League South East Division	2.06	35	Promoted to Step 3
Cheshunt	Isthmian League South Central Division	2	36	Promoted to Step 3
Radcliffe	Northern Premier League Division One West	1.97	39	Promoted to Step 3
Yate Town	Southern Football League Division One South	1.97	23	Promoted to Step 3
Heybridge Swifts	Isthmian League North Division	1.95	19	Retented at Step 4
Brighouse Town	Northern Premier League Division One East	1.87	31	Retented at Step 4

== Challenge Cup ==
2018–19 Integro League Cup
Tournament details
- Country: England; Wales
- Teams: 62

Final positions
- Champions: Trafford
- Runners-up: Farsley Celtic

The 2018–19 Northern Premier League Challenge Cup, known as the 18–19 Integro Doodson League Cup for sponsorship reasons, is the 49th season of the Northern Premier League Challenge Cup, the main cup competition in the Northern Premier League. It is sponsored by Doodson Sport for a seventh consecutive season. 61 clubs from England and one from Wales will enter the competition, beginning with the First Round, and all ties will end after 90 minutes and conclude with penalties.

The defending champions, Atherton Collieries, were defeated in the first round by Droylsden.

=== First round ===
17 September 2018	Atherton Collieries	1–2	Droylsden	Atherton
19:45	Cover 2'		Daly 41'; Doyle 80'	Stadium: Alder House; Attendance: 181

17 September 2018	Brighouse Town	1–0	Ossett United	Brighouse
19:45	Robinson 90'			Stadium: St Giles Road; Attendance: 172

18 September 2018	Bamber Bridge	2–1	Mossley	Bamber Bridge
19:45				Stadium: Sir Tom Finney Stadium

18 September 2018	Buxton	1–0	Colwyn Bay	Buxton
19:45				Stadium: The Silverlands

18 September 2018	Colne	2–0	Kendal Town	Colne
19:45				Stadium: Holt House

18 September 2018	Farsley Celtic	4–0	Pontefract Collieries	Farsley
19:45				Stadium: Throstle Nest

18 September 2018	Frickley Athletic	5–4	Cleethorpes Town	South Elmsall
19:45				Stadium: Westfield Lane

18 September 2018	Grantham Town	0–6	Glossop North End	Grantham
19:45				Stadium: South Kesteven Sports Stadium

18 September 2018	Gresley	4–1	Gainsborough Trinity	Church Gresley
19:45				Stadium: Moat Ground

18 September 2018	Hyde United	4–2	Stalybridge Celtic	Hyde
19:45				Stadium: Ewen Fields

18 September 2018	Lancaster City	2–2 (4–3 p)	Radcliffe	Lancaster
19:45				Stadium: Giant Axe

18 September 2018	Loughborough Dynamo	1–3	Basford United	Loughborough
19:45				Stadium: Nanpantan Sports Ground

18 September 2018	Marske United	3–1	North Ferriby United	Marske-by-the-Sea
19:45				Stadium: Mount Pleasant

18 September 2018	Nantwich Town	1–1 (1–4 p)	Chasetown	Nantwich
19:45				Stadium: Weaver Stadium

18 September 2018	Pickering Town	1–2	Whitby Town	Pickering
19:45				Stadium: Mill Lane

18 September 2018	Runcorn Linnets	1–1 (5–4 p)	Warrington Town	Runcorn
19:45				Stadium: Millbank Linnets Stadium; Attendance: 228

18 September 2018	Scarborough Athletic	3–2	Tadcaster Albion	Scarborough
19:45				Stadium: Flamingo Land Stadium

18 September 2018	Sheffield	3–1	Stocksbridge Park Steels	Dronfield
19:45				Stadium: Coach and Horses Ground

18 September 2018	Skelmersdale United	3–3 (2–4 p)	Trafford	Prescot
19:45				Stadium: Valerie Park

18 September 2018	South Shields	1–4	Morpeth Town	South Shields
19:45				Stadium: Mariners Park

18 September 2018	Spalding United	1–1 (2–4 p)	Belper Town	Spalding
19:45				Stadium: Sir Halley Stewart Field

18 September 2018	Stafford Rangers	1–1 (5–3 p)	Market Drayton Town	Stafford
19:45				Stadium: Marston Road

18 September 2018	Stamford	0–3	Mickleover Sports	Stamford
19:45				Stadium: Borderville

18 September 2018	Wisbech Town	1–3	AFC Mansfield	Wisbech
19:45				Stadium: Fenland Stadium

18 September 2018	Witton Albion	2–1	Widnes	Wincham
19:45				Stadium: Wincham Park

18 September 2018	Workington	1–2	Prescot Cables	Workington
19:45				Stadium: Borough Park

19 September 2018	Kidsgrove Athletic	3–1	Hednesford Town	Kidsgrove
19:45				Stadium: Hollinwood Road

19 September 2018	Lincoln United	1–2	Carlton Town	Lincoln
19:45				Stadium: Ashby Avenue

19 September 2018	Ramsbottom United	1–1 (6–7 p)	Clitheroe	Ramsbottom
19:45				Stadium: Harry Williams Riverside Stadium

23 October 2018	Leek Town	5–3	Newcastle Town	Leek
				Stadium: Harrison Park; Attendance: 155

=== Second round ===
29 October 2018	Basford United	1–0	Matlock Town	Basford
19:45				Stadium: Greenwich Avenue; Attendance: 212

30 October 2018	Bamber Bridge	3–1	Colne	Bamber Bridge
19:45				Stadium: Sir Tom Finney Stadium; Attendance: 206

30 October 2018	Chasetown	1–2	Stafford Rangers	Chasetown
19:45				Stadium: The Scholars Ground; Attendance: 198

30 October 2018	Frickley Athletic	1–1 (4–5 p)	Farsley Celtic	South Elmsall
19:45				Stadium: Westfield Lane; Attendance: 119

30 October 2018	Marine	2–0	Lancaster City	Crosby
19:45	Danny Shaw (2)			Stadium: Rossett Park; Attendance: 143

30 October 2018	Morpeth Town	2–0	Brighouse Town	Morpeth
19:45				Stadium: Craik Park

30 October 2018	Prescot Cables	1–2	Hyde United	Prescot
19:45				Stadium: Valerie Park

30 October 2018	Scarborough Athletic	1–1 (4–1 p)	Whitby Town	Scarborough
19:45				Stadium: Flamingo Land Stadium

30 October 2018	Sheffield	1–3	Marske United	Dronfield
19:45				Stadium: Coach and Horses Ground

30 October 2018	Trafford	0–0 (5–4 p)	Clitheroe	Flixton
19:45				Stadium: Share View

30 October 2018	Witton Albion	1–2	Kidsgrove Athletic	Wincham
19:45				Stadium: Wincham Park

31 October 2018	Carlton Town	0–2	Gresley	Carlton
19:45				Stadium: Stokeld Stadium

20 November 2018	Belper Town	2–1	AFC Mansfield	Belper
19:45				Stadium: Christchurch Meadow; Attendance: 103

20 November 2018	Glossop North End	2–4	Droylsden	Glossop
19:45				Stadium: Arthur Goldthorpe Stadium; Attendance: 116

20 November 2018	Leek Town	1–4	Runcorn Linnets	Leek
19:45				Stadium: Harrison Park; Attendance: 151

20 November 2018	Mickleover Sports	0–3	Buxton	Mickleover
19:45				Stadium: Station Road; Attendance: 85

=== Third round ===
3 December 2018	Basford United	2–3	Buxton	Basford
19:45				Stadium: Greenwich Avenue; Attendance: 123

4 December 2018	Droylsden	2–2 (7–8 p)	Trafford	Droylsden
19:45				Stadium: Butcher's Arms Ground; Attendance: 89

4 December 2018	Farsley Celtic	2–1	Scarborough Athletic	Farsley
19:45				Stadium: Throstle Nest; Attendance: 183

4 December 2018	Hyde United	1–1 (1–4 p)	Runcorn Linnets	Hyde
19:45				Stadium: Ewen Fields; Attendance: 160

4 December 2018	Marske United	0–0 (4–3 p)	Morpeth Town	Marske-by-the-Sea
19:45				Stadium: Mount Pleasant; Attendance: 156

4 December 2018	Stafford Rangers	1–1 (4–2 p)	Marine	Stafford
19:45				Stadium: Marston Road; Attendance: 165

11 December 2018	Belper Town	2–0	Gresley	Belper
19:45				Stadium: Valerie Park

12 December 2018	Kidsgrove Athletic	1–3	Bamber Bridge	Kidsgrove
19:45				Stadium: Flamingo Land Stadium

=== Quarter-finals ===
29 January 2019	Bamber Bridge	2–3	Belper Town	Bamber Bridge
				Stadium: Sir Tom Finney Stadium

29 January 2019	Stafford Rangers	0–5	Farsley Celtic	Stafford
				Stadium: Marston Road

5 February 2019	Buxton	3–3 (4–2 p)	Marske United	Buxton
				Stadium: The Silverlands

5 February 2019	Runcorn Linnets	1–3	Trafford	Runcorn
				Stadium: Millbank Linnets Stadium; Attendance: 261

=== Semi-finals ===
12 March 2019	Farsley Celtic	3–1	Belper Town	Farsley
				Stadium: Throstle Nest

12 March 2019	Trafford	1–0	Buxton	Flixton
				Stadium: Share View

=== Final ===
16 April 2019	Farsley Celtic	1–2	Trafford	Moston
				Stadium: Broadhurst Park

== See also ==
- Northern Premier League
- 2018–19 Isthmian League
- 2018–19 Southern League
