= 2018–19 Northern Counties East Football League =

The 2018–19 Northern Counties East Football League season was the 37th in the history of Northern Counties East Football League, a football competition in England.

== Premier Division ==
Northern Counties East Football League Premier Division
- Season: 2018–19
- Champions: Worksop Town
- Promoted: Worksop Town
- Relegated: Hall Road Rangers; Harrogate Railway Athletic
- Matches: 380
- Goals: 1,362 (3.58 per match)
- Top goalscorer: Ashley Flynn, Yorkshire Amateur (38)
- Highest attendance: 1,628 – Worksop Town vs Penistone Church
- Lowest attendance: 25 – Yorkshire Amateur vs Albion Sports
- Average attendance: 137

The Premier Division featured 16 clubs which competed in the previous season, along with four new clubs.

- Clubs promoted from Division One:
  - Eccleshill United
  - Knaresborough Town
  - Yorkshire Amateur
- Plus:
  - Goole, relegated from the Northern Premier League

=== League table ===
Pos	Team	Pld	W	D	L	GF	GA	GD	Pts	Promotion or relegation
1	Worksop Town	38	28	6	4	95	40	+55	90	Promoted to the Northern Premier League Division One South East
2	Penistone Church	38	26	4	8	112	49	+63	82	
3	Bridlington Town	38	24	5	9	98	51	+47	77	
4	Hemsworth Miners Welfare	38	24	3	11	89	51	+38	75	
5	Yorkshire Amateur	38	23	4	11	83	62	+21	73	
6	Maltby Main	38	19	11	8	66	37	+29	68	
7	Staveley Miners Welfare	38	19	10	9	77	45	+32	67	
8	Handsworth Parramore	38	19	6	13	70	67	+3	63	
9	Knaresborough Town	38	18	6	14	70	57	+13	60	
10	Eccleshill United	38	15	8	15	69	75	−6	53	
11	Barton Town	38	15	7	16	56	53	+3	52	
12	Bottesford Town	38	14	10	14	61	65	−4	52	
13	Liversedge	38	15	3	20	56	80	−24	48	
14	Garforth Town	38	12	6	20	52	60	−8	42	
15	Thackley	38	10	10	18	66	76	−10	40	
16	Albion Sports	38	12	4	22	64	86	−22	40	
17	Athersley Recreation	38	9	4	25	43	88	−45	31	
18	Goole	38	7	2	29	41	102	−61	23	
19	Harrogate Railway Athletic	38	4	10	24	44	103	−59	22	Relegated to Division One
20	Hall Road Rangers	38	5	5	28	50	115	−65	20	Relegated to Division One

Source: NCE Tables
Rules for classification: 1) Points; 2) Goal difference; 3) Number of goals scored; 4) Number of matches won; 5) Head-to-head results

=== Stadia and locations ===
Location of the clubs in the 2018–19 NCEL Premier Division on a map of Yorkshire and the Humber

Club	Stadium	Capacity
Albion Sports	Throstle Nest (Note: home of Farsley Celtic (groundshare))	3,500
Athersley Recreation	Sheerien Park	2,000
Barton Town	Euronics Ground	3,000
Bottesford Town	Birch Park	1,000
Bridlington Town	Queensgate	3,000
Eccleshill United	Kings Way	2,225
Garforth Town	Wheatley Park	3,000
Goole	Victoria Pleasure Grounds	3,000
Hall Road Rangers	Haworth Park	1,200
Handsworth Parramore	Sandy Lane	2,500
Harrogate Railway Athletic	Station View	3,500
Hemsworth Miners Welfare	Fitzwilliam Stadium	2,000
Knaresborough Town	Manse Lane	1,000
Liversedge	Clayborn Ground	2,000
Maltby Main	Muglet Lane	2,000
Penistone Church	Church View Road	
Staveley Miners Welfare	Inkersall Road	5,000
Thackley	Dennyfield	3,000
Worksop Town	Sandy Lane (Note: home of Handsworth Parramore (groundshare))	2,500
Yorkshire Amateur	Bracken Edge	1,550

== Division One ==
Northern Counties East Football League Division One
- Season: 2018–19
- Champions: Grimsby Borough
- Promoted: Grimsby Borough
- Relegated: Harworth Colliery
- Matches: 380
- Goals: 1,328 (3.49 per match)

Division One featured 17 clubs which competed in the previous season, along with three new clubs:

- Harworth Colliery, promoted from the Central Midlands League
- Parkgate, relegated from the Premier Division
- Skegness Town, promoted from the Lincolnshire League

=== League table ===
Pos	Team	Pld	W	D	L	GF	GA	GD	Pts	Promotion or relegation
1	Grimsby Borough	38	26	6	6	108	44	+64	84	Promoted to the Premier Division
2	Campion	38	25	7	6	99	50	+49	82	
3	Hallam	38	22	10	6	84	39	+45	76	
4	Winterton Rangers	38	23	6	9	76	38	+38	75	
5	Nostell Miners Welfare	38	22	8	8	78	39	+39	74	
6	Dronfield Town	38	20	7	11	64	47	+17	67	
7	Worsbrough Bridge Athletic	38	19	5	14	76	77	−1	62	
8	Parkgate	38	19	4	15	64	56	+8	61	
9	Selby Town	38	18	3	17	82	76	+6	57	
10	Swallownest	38	15	7	16	57	62	−5	52	
11	Glasshoughton Welfare	38	15	5	18	47	62	−15	50	
12	AFC Emley	38	14	6	18	71	68	+3	48	Transferred to the North West Counties League
13	East Yorkshire Carnegie	38	13	5	20	73	79	−6	44	
14	Rossington Main	38	12	6	20	49	77	−28	42	
15	Skegness Town	38	12	4	22	43	72	−29	40	
16	Ollerton Town	38	10	7	21	48	73	−25	37	
17	Armthorpe Welfare	38	11	4	23	58	89	−31	37	
18	Shirebrook Town	38	9	7	22	55	83	−28	34	Transferred to the East Midlands Counties League
19	FC Bolsover	38	9	4	25	49	110	−61	31	Reprieved from relegation and transferred to the East Midlands Counties League
20	Harworth Colliery	38	8	5	25	47	87	−40	29	Relegated to the Central Midlands League

Source: NCE tables
Rules for classification: 1) Points; 2) Goal difference; 3) Number of goals scored; 4) Number of matches won; 5) Head-to-head results

=== Stadia & locations ===
Location of the clubs in the 2018–19 NCEL Division One on a map of Yorkshire and the Humber
Location of the clubs in the 2018–19 NCEL Division One on a map of the East Midlands

Club	Stadium	Capacity
Armthorpe Welfare	Welfare Ground	2,500
FC Bolsover	Langwith Road (Note: home of Shirebrook Town (groundshare))	
Campion	Scotchman Road	
Dronfield Town	Stonelow Ground	500
East Yorkshire Carnegie	Dene Park	2,000
AFC Emley	The Welfare Ground	2,000
Glasshoughton Welfare	Glasshoughton Centre	2,000
Grimsby Borough	Bradley Football Centre	1,000
Hallam	Sandygate Road	1,000
Harworth Colliery	Recreation Ground	
Nostell Miners Welfare	The Welfare Ground	1,500
Ollerton Town	Walesby Lane	
Parkgate	Roundwood Sports Complex	1,000
Rossington Main	Welfare Ground	2,000
Selby Town	Richard Street	5,000
Shirebrook Town	Langwith Road	2,000
Skegness Town	Vertigo Stadium	
Swallownest	Miners Welfare Ground	
Winterton Rangers	West Street	3,000
Worsbrough Bridge Athletic	Park Road	2,000

== League Cup ==
2018–19 Northern Counties East Football League League Cup
Tournament details
- Country: England

The 2018–19 Northern Counties East Football League League Cup was the 37th season of the league cup competition of the Northern Counties East Football League.

=== First round ===
Home team	Score	Away team
Shirebrook Town	3–0	Rossington Main
East Yorkshire Carnegie	1–2	Ollerton Town

Home team	Score	Away team
Parkgate	1–5	Campion
Harworth Colliery Institute	1–4	Winterton Rangers

=== Second round ===
Home team	Score	Away team
Penistone Church	6–0	Harrogate Railway Athletic
Yorkshire Amateur	1–2	Handsworth Parramore

Home team	Score	Away team
Maltby Main	3–2	Glasshoughton Welfare
Bridlington Town	1–3	Goole

=== Third round ===
Home team	Score	Away team
Dronfield Town	2–4	Staveley Miners Welfare
Garforth Town	2–1	Shirebrook Town
Liversedge	10–2	Armthorpe Welfare

Home team	Score	Away team
Hall Road Rangers	5–0	Grimsby Borough
Hallam	2–0	Knaresborough Town
