= Tom Coulbeck =

English footballer

Personal information
- Full name: Thomas Coulbeck
- Date of birth: 4 July 1885
- Place of birth: Caistor, England
- Date of death: 10 August 1955 (aged 70)
- Position: Inside forward

Senior career*
| Years | Team | Apps | (Gls) |
| 1906–1907 | Cleethorpes Town | | |
| 1907–1910 | Grimsby Town | 13 | (4) |
| 1910–1912 | Gainsborough Trinity | 56 | (9) |
| 1912–1913 | Cleethorpes Town | | |
| 1913–1914 | Gainsborough Trinity | | |
| 1914–1919 | Cleethorpes Town | | |
| 1919–19?? | Haycroft Rovers | | |
- * Club domestic league appearances and goals

Thomas Coulbeck (4 July 1885 – 10 August 1955) was an English professional footballer who played as an inside forward.
