= A.F.C. Mansfield =

Association football club in England

Coordinates: 53.1515°N 1.1614°W

AFC Mansfield
- Full name: Association Football Club Mansfield
- Nickname: The Bulls
- Founded: 2012
- Ground: Forest Town Arena, Forest Town
- Chairman: Mike Abbs
- Manager: Phil Buxton
- League: United Counties League Premier Division North
- 2025–26: United Counties League Premier Division North, 6th of 20
Home colours	Away colours

A.F.C. Mansfield is a football club based in Forest Town, a suburb of Mansfield, Nottinghamshire, England. Nicknamed 'The Bulls', they are members of the United Counties League Premier Division North and play at the Forest Town Arena.

== History ==
A.F.C. Mansfield was formed in June 2012 by three former directors of Mansfield Town following a series of management disputes. Their first fixture, under newly appointed manager, ex-Shirebrook boss Mickey Taylor, was a 2012 pre-season friendly away against local side Rainworth MW.

The new club were immediately given a place in the Central Midlands League, and were placed in the North Division. After finishing as runners-up in their first season, the club won the North Division in 2013–14, earning promotion to Division One of the Northern Counties East League. They also completed the double, winning the Central Midlands League Cup, beating Thorne Colliery 2–1 in the final.

AFC Mansfield finished seventh in Division One in 2014–15. The following season saw them finish as runners-up, earning promotion to the Premier Division. They also competed in the FA Cup for the first time, losing 2–1 at South Normanton Athletic in the extra-preliminary round. The club finished third in the Premier Division in 2017–18, missing out on promotion on goal difference. However, after Andover Town refused promotion, AFC Mansfield were promoted instead, moving up to Division One East of the Northern Premier League. Despite finishing outside the relegation zone, the club were demoted to the Northern Counties East League's Premier Division at the end of the 2018–19 season after their ground failed to meet the necessary criteria.

In 2022 AFC Mansfield were transferred to the Premier Division North of the United Counties League.

=== Season-by-season record ===
Season	Division	Level	Position	FA Cup	FA Trophy	FA Vase	Notes
2012–13	Central Midlands League North Division	11	2/17	–	–	–	
2013–14	Central Midlands League North Division	11	1/17	–	–	Second round	Promoted
2014–15	Northern Counties East League Division One	10	7/22	–	–	Fifth round	
2015–16	Northern Counties East League Division One	10	2/21	Extra-preliminary	–	Second round	Promoted
2016–17	Northern Counties East League Premier Division	9	7/22	Third qualifying round	–	Fourth round	
2017–18	Northern Counties East League Premier Division	9	3/22	Third qualifying round	–	Second round	Promoted
2018–19	Northern Premier League Division One East	8	15/20	Second qualifying round	Second qualifying round	–	Demoted
2019–20	Northern Counties East League Premier Division	9	–	First qualifying round	–	Third round	Season curtailed due to COVID-19 pandemic
2020–21	Northern Counties East League Premier Division	9	–	Second qualifying round	–	First round	Season curtailed due to COVID-19 pandemic

== Honours ==
- Central Midlands League
  - North Division champions 2013–14
  - League Challenge Cup winners 2013–14
- Nottinghamshire Intermediate Cup
  - Winners 2012–13
- Toolstation Charity Cup
  - Winners 2017–18

== Records ==
- Best FA Cup performance: Third qualifying round, 2016–17, 2017–18
- Best FA Trophy performance: Second qualifying round, 2018–19
- Best FA Vase performance: Fifth round, 2014–15
- Record attendance : 613 vs Boston United, FA Cup third qualifying round, 30 September 2017
- Record win: 16–0 Yorkshire Main, Central Midlands League North Division, 15 September 2012

== See also ==
- A.F.C. Mansfield players
- A.F.C. Mansfield managers
