= Emley A.F.C. =

Association football club in England

Coordinates: 53.612629°N 1.6319150°W

Emley
- Full name: Emley Association Football Club
- Nickname: The Pewits
- Founded: 2005
- Ground: Welfare Ground, Emley
- Capacity: 2,000 (305 seated)
- Chairman: Marcus Pound
- Manager: Richard Tracey
- League: Northern Premier League Premier Division
- 2025–26: Northern Premier League Division One East, 3rd of 22 (promoted via play-offs)
Home colours	Away colours	Third colours

Emley Association Football Club is a football club based in Emley, West Yorkshire, England. Known as AFC Emley from 2005 to 2019, they are currently members of Northern Premier League Premier Division and play at the Welfare Ground. They are nicknamed The Pewits.

== History ==
The original Emley club were founded in 1903 and were members of the Huddersfield District League, Yorkshire League and Northern Counties East League, before winning promotion to the Northern Premier League in 1989. In 2000 new ground grading regulations introduced by the Northern Premier League led to the club relocating to Belle Vue in Wakefield, although the reserve team continued to play at the Welfare Ground in Emley. In 2002 the club was renamed Wakefield & Emley, and when the reserve team (which still played in Emley) was disbanded in 2005, supporters of the original club decided to establish a new club based in Emley under the name A.F.C. Emley. The following year Wakefield & Emley was renamed Wakefield, and remained in the Northern Premier League until disbanding in 2014.

A new Emley club was established in 2005 and joined Division One of the West Yorkshire League for the 2005–06 season. After finishing third in their first season, they were promoted to Division One of the Northern Counties East League. In 2014 the club rejected a merger with the Wakefield club. In 2015–16 they finished fourth in Division One, qualifying for the promotion play-offs. After beating Penistone Church 1–0 in the semi-finals, they lost 4–3 on penalties to Bottesford Town in the final after a 1–1 draw. Striker Ashley Flynn finished the season with 73 goals, a league record. In 2016–17 the club finished third, missing out on automatic promotion on goal difference; they went on to lose 3–1 to Penistone Church in the play-off semi-finals.

In March 2019 it was announced that the club would be renamed Emley A.F.C. from the start of the 2019–20 season, five years after the original club was dissolved. The club were transferred to Division One North of the North West Counties League for the 2019–20 season. They were fourth in Division One North with games in hand on two clubs above them by mid-March 2020, but the season was the abandoned due to the COVID-19 pandemic. They were subsequently transferred back to Division One of the Northern Counties East League for the 2020–21 season and were top of the league when the season was abandoned in February 2021. In May 2021 the club were promoted to the Premier Division based on their results in the two abandoned seasons. In 2022–23 they won the Sheffield & Hallamshire Senior Cup, beating Maltby Main 2–0 in the final.

The 2023–24 season saw Emley win the NCEL Premier Division title, securing promotion to Division One East of the Northern Premier League. In the following season they finished fifth in Division One East, before losing 1–0 to Dunston in the play-off semi-finals. In 2025–26 the club finished fourth, going on to beat Dunston 1–0 and then winning the final against Bradford (Park Avenue) on penalties to earn promotion to the Premier Division.

=== Season-by-season record ===
Season	Division	Level	Position	FA Cup	FA Trophy	FA Vase	Notes
2005–06	West Yorkshire League Division One	12	3/15	–	–	-	Promoted
2006–07	Northern Counties East League Division One	10	13/17	–	-	2QR	
2007–08	Northern Counties East League Division One	10	11/17	PR	-	1R	
2008–09	Northern Counties East League Division One	10	8/19	EPR	-	2QR	
2009–10	Northern Counties East League Division One	10	8/18	EPR	-	2QR	
2010–11	Northern Counties East League Division One	10	8/20	PR	-	2R	
2011–12	Northern Counties East League Division One	10	10/20	EPR	-	1R	
2012–13	Northern Counties East League Division One	10	7/22	EPR	-	4R	
2013–14	Northern Counties East League Division One	10	8/22	PR	-	1R	
2014–15	Northern Counties East League Division One	10	5/22	PR	-	1R	
2015–16	Northern Counties East League Division One	10	4/21	PR	-	2QR	
2016–17	Northern Counties East League Division One	10	3/22	PR	-	2R	
2017–18	Northern Counties East League Division One	10	12/22	EPR	-	1R	
2018–19	Northern Counties East League Division One	10	12/20	–	-	1QR	Transferred to NWCFL
2019–20	North West Counties League Division One North	10	–	–	-	2QR	League season abandoned due to COVID-19 pandemic, transferred back to NCEL
2020–21	Northern Counties East League Division One	10	-		-	1QR	League season abandoned due to COVID-19 pandemic, promoted on PPG basis
2021–22	Northern Counties East League Premier Division	9	9/20	PR	-	2R	
2022–23	Northern Counties East League Premier Division	9	3/20	EP	-	2R	Sheffield & Hallamshire Senior Cup winners
2023–24	Northern Counties East League Premier Division	9	1/20	3QR	-	QF	Champions, promoted, League Cup runners-up
2024–25	Northern Premier League Division One East	8	5/22	1QR	2QR	-	Play-off semi-finalists
2025–26	Northern Premier League Division One East	8	3/22	PR	1QR	-	Play-off winners, promoted
Season	Division	Level	Position	FA Cup	FA Trophy	FA Vase	Notes
Source: FCHD

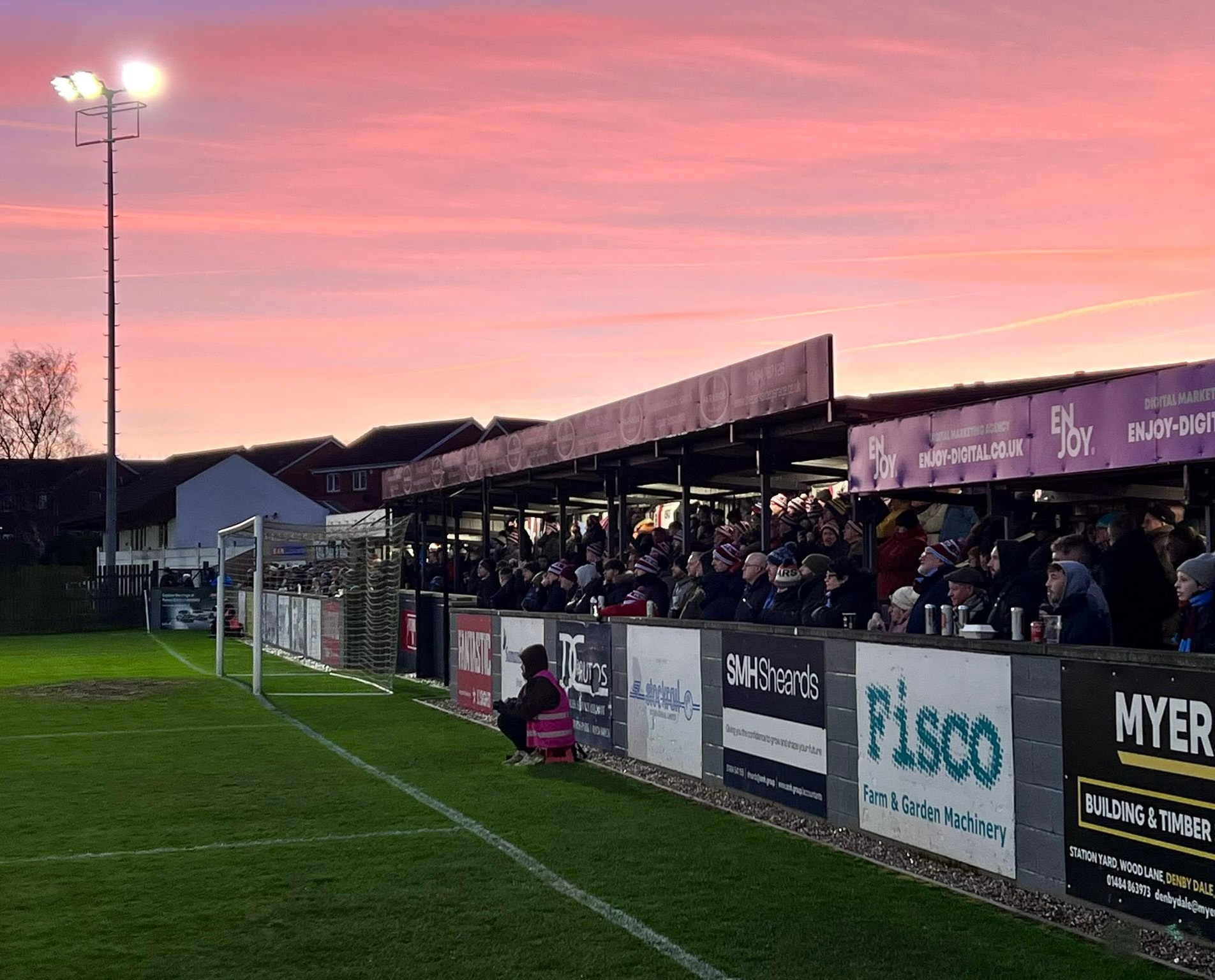
Emley fans packing the Shed, New Year's Day 2026

== Ground ==
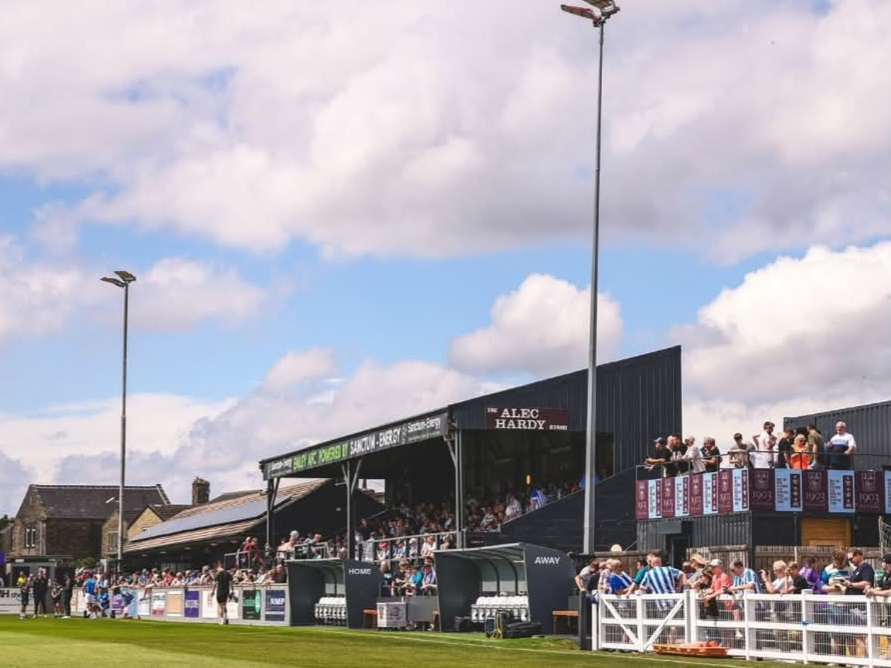
Main Stand at Emley following 2025 upgrade with hospitality box

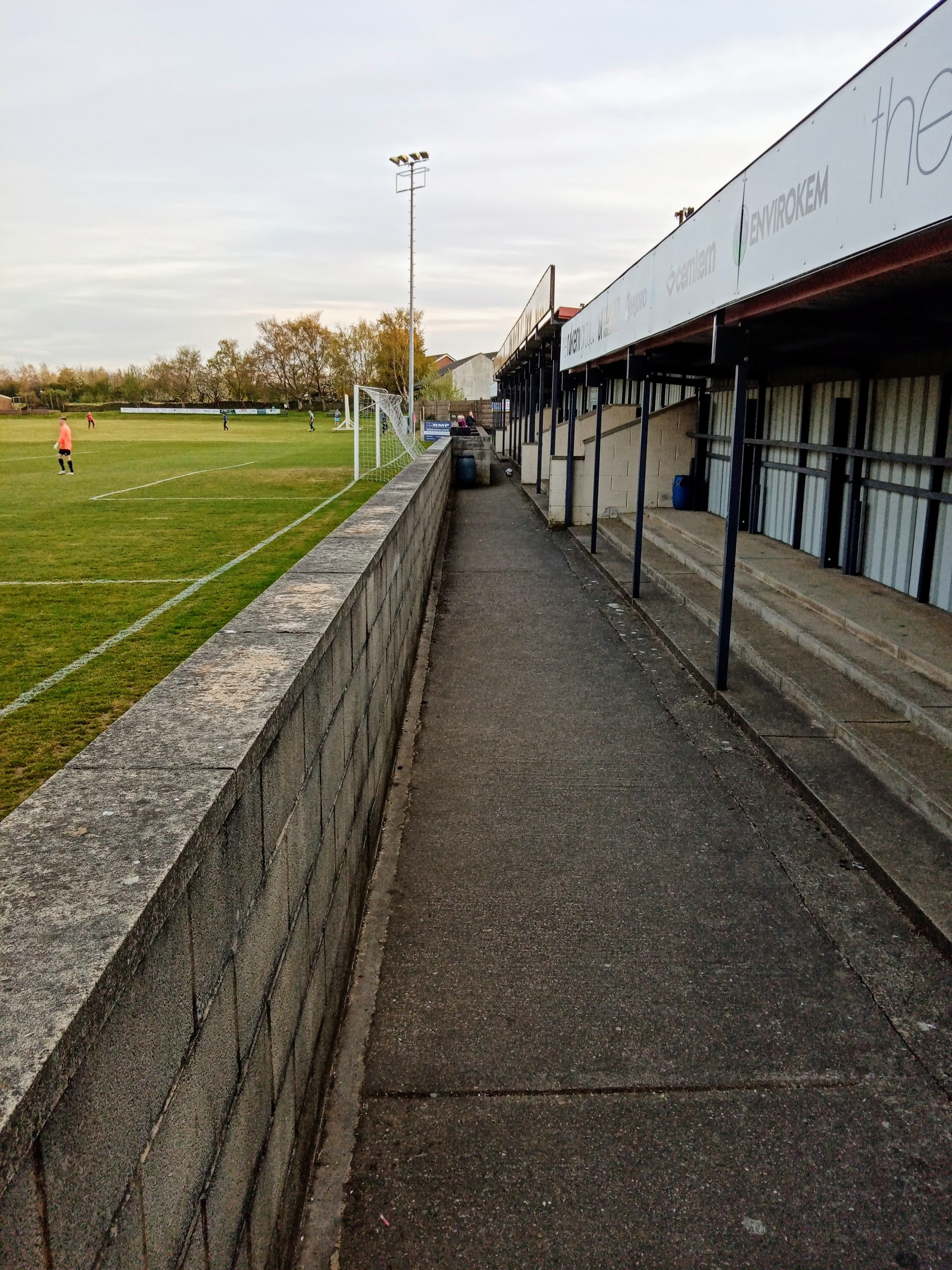
Inside the Richard Hirst stand (the shed)

The club plays at the Welfare Ground in Emley. It has a capacity of 2,000, of which 1,000 is covered and 305 seated. The ground is shared with the local cricket club is therefore three-sided; the Warburton End, which consists of a small terrace and uncovered hard standing behind one goal; the Main stand (Alec Hardy Stand) side which has a small terrace section below the seats, uncovered terracing and hard flat standing towards the Warburton end, small area of terrace steps at the other end housing the clubs offices, changing rooms and sports bar; and the Richard Hirst Stand (also known as The Shed), a low covered terrace behind the other goal which is home to Emley's vocal supporters and supporters' flags. During the football season, a fence is erected along the cricket field side. The main stand and dugouts were upgraded during summer 2023 with new seats being brought in from the Kirklees Stadium. An electronic scoreboard was installed at the Warburton end during the 2023–24 season and new LED floodlights were installed in the summer of 2024. Hospitality facilities were installed in the summer of 2025 at the Warburton end and also down the stand side.

== Rivals ==
Emley have a local rivalry with Golcar United in the 'Huddersfield derby'. as well a cross county rivalry with South Yorkshire-based Penistone Church. Ossett United, Brighouse Town and Liversedge are also local rivals.

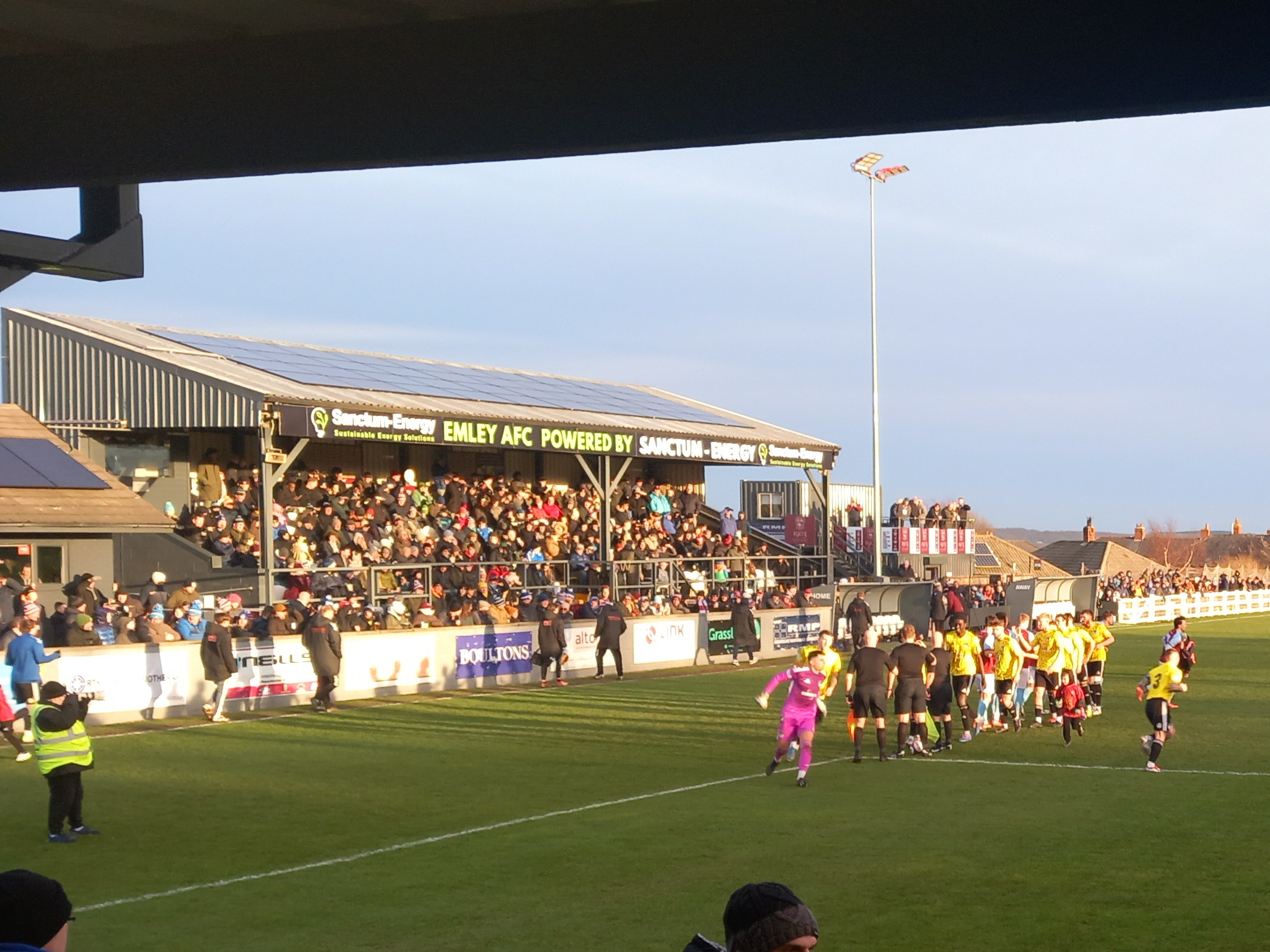
Emley's main stand on New Year's Day 2026

== Management hierarchy ==
Position	Name	Source
Manager	Richard Tracey	
Assistant Manager	Steve Nicholson	
Coaches	Ben Walker	
Coaches	Richard Batley	
Goalkeeping Coach	David Walsh	
Assistant goalkeeping coach	Chris Brown	
Physios	Richard Walker	
Physios	John Mason	
Academy manager	Steve Sennett	
Academy Coach	Conner Tuff	

== Honours ==
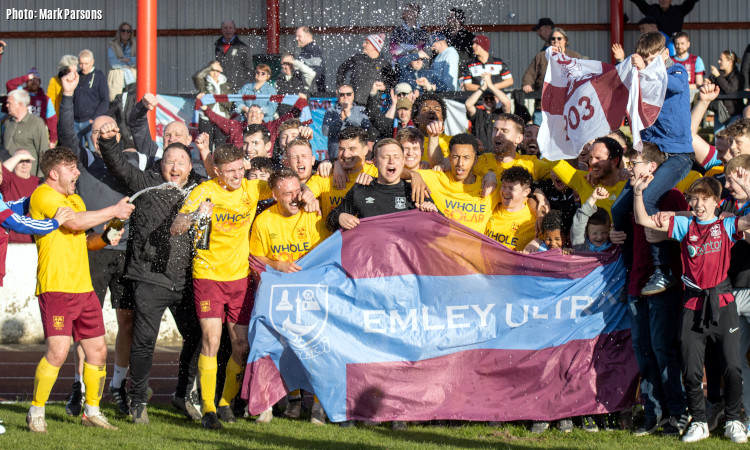
Emley celebrate winning the 2023–24 Northern Counties East League Premier Division

- Northern Counties East League
  - Premier Division champions 2023–24
- Sheffield & Hallamshire Senior Cup
  - Winners 2022–23

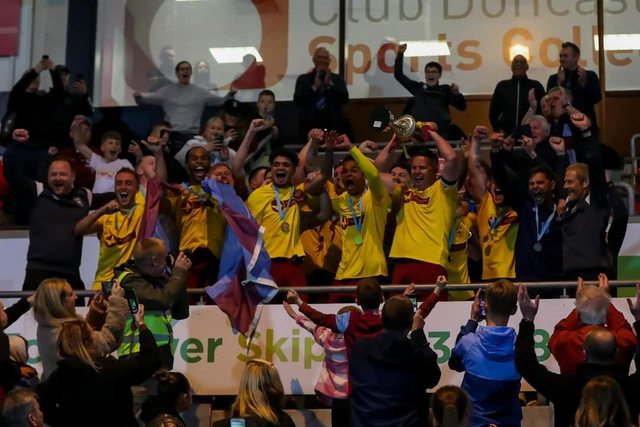
Emley win the Sheffield & Hallamshire Senior Cup in May 2023

== Records ==
- Best FA Cup performance: Third qualifying round, 2023–24
- Best FA Trophy performance: Second qualifying round, 2024–25
- Best FA Vase performance: Quarter-finals, 2023–24
- Record attendance: 1,771 vs Bradford (Park Avenue), Northern Premier League Division One East play-off final, 2 May 2026

== See also ==
- Emley A.F.C. players
- Emley A.F.C. managers
