= Cleethorpes Town F.C. =

Association football club in England

Coordinates: 53.555379°N 0.055572734°W

Cleethorpes Town
- Full name: Cleethorpes Town Football Club
- Nickname: The Owls
- Founded: 1998
- Ground: Linden Club, Grimsby
- Capacity: 2,200
- Chairman: Jason Ledden
- Manager: Craig Rouse
- League: Northern Premier League Premier Division
- 2025–26: Northern Premier League Premier Division, 9th of 21
- Website: cleethorpestownfc.co.uk
Home colours	Away colours

Cleethorpes Town Football Club is a football club based in Grimsby in North East Lincolnshire, England. The club are currently members of the Northern Premier League Premier Division and play at the Linden Club.

== History ==
The club was established by Tommy Watson in 1998 as the Lincolnshire Soccer School, with Watson playing for and managing the club. As LSS Lucarly's, they joined the Lincolnshire League in 2003, where they played for two seasons. In 2005 the club transferred to the Premier Division of the Central Midlands League in 2005. However, after one season they left to join Division One of the Humber Premier League. After finishing third in their first season in the division, they were promoted to the Premier Division. In 2008 the club adopted their current name.

Cleethorpes pulled out of the Humber Premier League during the 2009–10 season, but rejoined the Lincolnshire League for the 2010–11 season, which saw them win the Supplementary Cup. After winning the league and Challenge Cup in 2011–12, they were promoted to Division One of the Northern Counties East League. In 2013–14 they won Division One, earning promotion to the Premier Division. In 2015–16 they won the League Cup, beating Tadcaster Albion 3–2 in the final. The following season saw the club win the Premier Division, earning promotion to Division One South of the Northern Premier League. They also won the Lincolnshire County Senior Trophy with a 1–0 win over Deeping Rangers in the final, as well as reaching the final of the FA Vase at Wembley, where they lost 4–0 to South Shields.

In 2018–19 Cleethorpes won the Lincolnshire Senior Cup for the first time, defeating Stamford 5–3 on penalties after a 3–3 draw. In 2024–25 the club won the Division One East title, securing promotion to the Premier Division.

== Honours ==
- Northern Premier League
  - Division One East champions 2024–25
- Northern Counties East League
  - Premier Division champions 2016–17
  - Division One champions 2013–14
  - League Cup winners 2015–16
- Lincolnshire League
  - Champions 2011–12
  - Challenge Cup Winners 2011–12
  - Supplementary Cup winners 2010–11
- Lincolnshire Senior Cup
  - Winners 2018–19
- Lincolnshire County Senior Trophy
  - Winners 2016–17

== Records ==
- Best FA Cup performance: Third qualifying round, 2018–19, 2021–22
- Best FA Trophy performance: Third qualifying round, 2018–19, 2025–26
- Best FA Vase performance: Finalists, 2016–17

== See also ==
- Cleethorpes Town F.C. players
- Cleethorpes Town F.C. managers
