= Westella & Willerby F.C. =

Association football club in England

Coordinates: 53.797892°N 0.366858°W

Westella & Willerby AFC
- Full name: Westella & Willerby Football Club
- Founded: 1901
- Ground: Roy Waudby Arena, Hilltop, Willerby (Juniors & Open Age Teams)
- Chairman: Jeremy Alcock
- League: East Riding County League
Home colours

Westella & Willerby Football Club is a football club based in Willerby, East Riding of Yorkshire, England. They are currently members of the East Riding County League.

== History ==
Westella & Willerby was formed in 1901, although the club's website indicates that teams were playing under the banner of Westella & Willerby in around 1910–11. They played in the East Riding County League for many decades and in 2000–01 they were founder members of the Humber Premier League and spent eight seasons in that league, their most successful campaign seeing the club finish as runners-up in the 2006–07 season. In 2008 they joined the Central Midlands League and immediately gained promotion from the Premier Division to the Supreme Division following a second-place finish. In 2011, the League was reorganised and the club was placed in the North Division, winning the League in the 2011–12 season but ground grading issues prevented the club from being promoted to the Northern Counties East League. For the 2012–13 season the club changed its name to Westella Hanson and also made its debut in the FA Vase, changing its name again, in 2014, to Westella VIP due to a sponsorship deal. The following year, after seven seasons in the Central Midlands League, the club was promoted to the Northern Counties East League. The club name reverted to Westella & Willerby for the 2016/17 season. The club was relegated from the Northern Counties East League after the 2017/18 season and re-joined the Humber Premier League.

== Honours ==
- Central Midlands League
  - North Division champions 2011–12

== Records ==
- Best FA Vase performance: Second rualifying round, 2016–17
