= Grimsby Borough F.C. =

Association football club in England

Coordinates: 53.547613°N 0.12274325°W

Grimsby Borough
- Nickname: The Wilderness Boys
- Founded: 2003
- Ground: The Bradley Football Development Centre, Grimsby
- Capacity: 1,250 (250 seated)
- Chairman: Jason Flint
- Manager: Vacant
- League: Northern Premier League Division One East
- 2025–26: Northern Premier League Division One East, 15th of 22
Home colours	Away colours

Grimsby Borough Football Club is a football club based in Grimsby, Lincolnshire, England. They are currently members of the Northern Premier League Division One East and play at the Bradley Football Development Centre.

== History ==
A previous club named Grimsby Borough joined the Supreme Division of the Central Midlands League under the name Grimsby Ross in 1987. They finished bottom of the division in 1988–89, and were renamed Grimsby Borough at the end of the season. After finishing bottom of the table again the following season, the club dropped into the Lincolnshire League. In 1990–91 they were Lincolnshire League runners-up, but left the league after finishing fourth the following season.

A new Grimsby Borough club was established in 2003, joining the Lincolnshire League for the 2003–04 season. After finishing as runners-up in their first season, they joined the Premier Division of the Central Midlands League. Despite finishing second in their first season in the league, they were not promoted to the Supreme Division. However, after finishing as runners-up again in 2006–07, they were promoted. In 2007–08 the club finished twelfth in the Supreme Division and were admitted to Division One of the Northern Counties East League. In 2011–12 they won the league's Wilkinson Sword Trophy. Although they finished bottom of the division in 2014–15, conceding 161 goals, they were not relegated back to step seven. A fourth-place finish in 2016–17 saw them qualify or the promotion play-offs. After beating Hallam 3–2 in the semi-finals, they lost 4–2 to Penistone Church in the final.

In 2018–19 Grimsby were Division One champions, earning promotion to the Premier Division. They were Premier Division champions in 2021–22 and were promoted to Division One East of the Northern Premier League.

== Ground ==
The club initially played at the King George V ground, before moving to the Grimsby Institute of Further & Higher Education following their promotion to the Central Midlands League. They later began groundsharing at Brigg Town's Hawthorns ground in order to progress to the Supreme Division of the CML. During the early months of the 2010–11 season the club played at Barton Town while awaiting the completion of their new ground

In 2010 the club moved to the Bradley Football Development Centre. The first game was played at the new ground on 24 November, where a record crowd of 580 saw them lose 4–3 to Scarborough Athletic in a League Cup match. The ground currently has a capacity of 1,250, of which 250 is seated.

== Honours ==
- Northern Counties East League
  - Premier Division champions 2021–22
  - Division One champions 2018–19
  - League Trophy winners 2011–12
- Lincolnshire Junior Cup
  - Winners 2007–08
- Ashby Benefits Cup
  - Winners 2009–10

== Records ==
- Best FA Cup performance: Second qualifying round, 2025–26
- Best FA Trophy performance: First qualifying round, 2022–23, 2023–24, 2024–25, 2025–26
- Best FA Vase performance: Third round, 2019–20

== See also ==
- Grimsby Borough F.C. players
