= Teversal F.C. =

Association football club in England

Coordinates: 53°08′50.14″N 1°17′09.41″W

Teversal
- Full name: Teversal Football Club
- Nickname: Tevie Boys
- Founded: 1918
- Ground: Teversal Grange Sports and Social Centre; Teversal, Nottinghamshire
- Capacity: 2,000
- Chairman: Nick James
- Manager: Dave Turner
- League: Central Midlands Alliance Premier Division North
- 2024–25: Central Midlands Alliance Premier Division South, 16th of 18 (transferred)
Home colours	Away colours

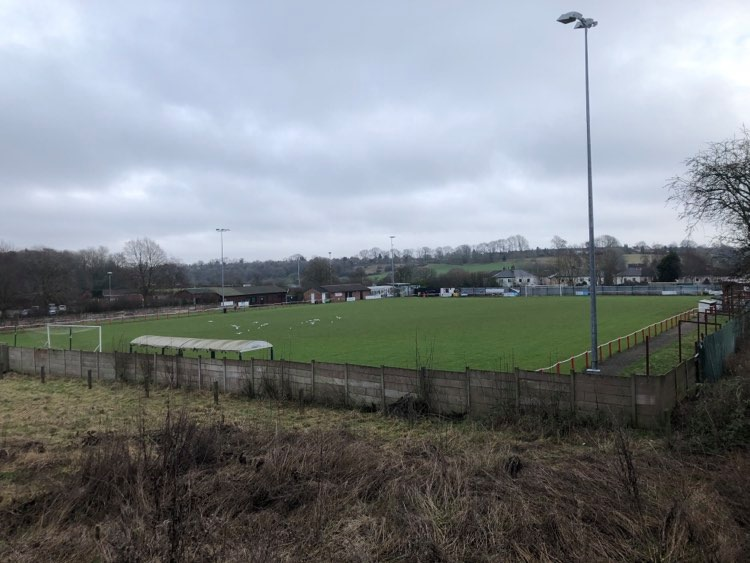
Teversal Grange and Social Centre viewed from nearby trail path

Teversal Football Club are a semi-professional football club based in Teversal, near Mansfield, Nottinghamshire, England. Teversal will rejoin the Central Midlands League for the 2022–23 season following relegation from the Northern Counties East League Division One.

== History ==
A previous club, Teversal Miners Welfare, had existed in the town since the 1918, playing at the same Carnarvon Street ground as is used today, but had long since dropped to playing youth football by the time the current senior set up re-established in 1986, under the name M W Teversal. The closure of the two local collieries (Teversal and Silverhill) lead to a period of uncertainty, but the local Ashfield District Council took over the trusteeship of the complex in 1989, with the name becoming the Teversal Grange Sports and Social Centre. The football club followed suit, changing the name to Teversal Grange. A further name-change took place in 2000 when they dropped the "Grange" to become simply Teversal F.C.

Upon formation, Miners Welfare Teversal joined the Central Midlands League, winning that league's second division in their inaugural season. but dropped down to the more local Nottinghamshire Alliance in 1991. After a spell of seven years in that company, but no league titles, they re-joined the Central Midlands in its lower Premier Division. The quality of the facilities available led to promotion to the Supreme Division in 2001, where they again consolidated for a period, this time four years, again without picking up the league title. Their third place in 2004–05 was enough however to merit a further promotion, and they commenced the 2006–07 campaign in the Northern Counties East Football League Division One. The club competed in the FA Vase for the first time in 2003–04 and two seasons later they made their debut appearance in the FA Cup. In 2017 they were transferred to the East Midlands Counties League

The club play at Teversal Grange Sports and Social Centre.

== Achievements ==
- FA Cup
  - Preliminary Round: 2005–06, 2007–08
- FA Vase
  - 1st Round Proper: 2008-09
