= Bottesford Town F.C. =

Association football club in England

Coordinates: 53.554564°N 0.67296356°W

Bottesford Town
- Full name: Bottesford Town Football Club
- Nickname: The Poachers
- Founded: 1974
- Ground: Barrett Steel Stadium
- Capacity: 1,000 (150 seated)
- Chairman: Howard Pirie
- Manager: Leigh Herrick, Paul Grimes
- League: Northern Counties East League Premier League
- 2025–26: Northern Counties East League Premier Division, 17th of 20
Home colours	Away colours

Bottesford Town Football Club is a football club based in Bottesford, Lincolnshire, England. They are currently members of the Northern Counties East League Premier Division and play at Birch Park in Scunthorpe.

== History ==
The club were established in 1974 and joined the Lincolnshire League. In 1977–78 they finished bottom of the Premier Division, but were not relegated as it was expanded from 14 to 16 clubs. However, after finishing second-from-bottom the following season, they were relegated to Division One. In 1987 the league was reduced to a single division, which the club became members of.

In 1986–87 they won the League Cup, a feat they repeated in 1988–89 and 1989–90. The latter season also saw them win the league for the first time, and they went on to retain the title for the next two seasons. They were runners-up in 1993–94, and in 2000 they joined the Premier Division of the Central Midlands League. After finishing third in their first season in the division, they were promoted to the Supreme Division. However, they were relegated back to the Premier Division at the end of the 2002–03 season after finishing bottom of the Supreme Division.

In 2005–06 Bottesford finished third in the Premier Division, earning promotion to the Supreme Division. The following season saw them crowned league champions, resulting in promotion to Division One of the Northern Counties East League. In 2015–16 they finished third, qualifying for the promotion playoffs. After beating Hallam 2–0 in the semi-finals, they won the final against AFC Emley 4–3 on penalties following a 1–1 draw to earn promotion to the Premier Division.

== Ground ==
The club initially played on pitches at the Frederick Gough School in Scunthorpe, before moving to Birch Park in 1983 when a lease on the site was granted by the local council. It currently has a capacity of 1,000, of which 90 is seated and 300 covered.

== Honours ==
- Central Midlands League
  - Supreme Division champions 2006–07
- Lincolnshire League
  - Champions 1989–90, 1990–91, 1991–92
  - League Cup winners 1986–87, 1988–89, 1989–90
  - Northern Counties East League
  - Division 1 Play Off Winners 2015-16

== Records ==
- Best FA Cup performance: Second qualifying round, 2024–25
- Best FA Vase performance: Third round, 2016–17, 2026–27
- Biggest Win 10-0 v Keighley Town 28/07/26
- Record Attendance 302 v Beverley Town NCEL 04/04/26
- Consecutive Wins 7, 23/11/13-08/03/14

== See also ==
- Bottesford Town F.C. players
