= Shirebrook Town F.C. =

Association football club in England

Coordinates: 53°12′25.47″N 1°12′22.65″W

Shirebrook Town
- Full name: Shirebrook Town Football Club
- Founded: 1985 (as Shirebrook Colliery)
- Ground: Langwith Road, Shirebrook
- Capacity: 2,000 (300 Seated)
- Chairman: Ryan Smith
- Manager: Stephan Bodle
- League: United Counties League Division One
- 2025–26: United Counties League Division One, 17th of 23
Home colours	Away colours

Shirebrook Town Football Club are a semi-professional football club based in Shirebrook, Derbyshire, England. They are currently members of United Counties League Division One and play at Langwith Road.

== History ==
The club was founded as Shirebrook Colliery, and joined the Central Midlands League. In 1985–86 they won the Senior Division, and were promoted to Division One. In their first season in Division One, they finished second, and were promoted to the Premier Division.

In 1993 the club changed its name to Shirebrook Town. They won the Supreme Division of the Central Midlands League in 2000–01, but were not promoted due to ground grading issues. The following season they won the league again, and this time were promoted to the First Division of the Northern Counties East League. After finishing as runners-up in their first season, they were not promoted due to ground issues. However, the following season (2003–04) they won Division One, and were promoted to the Premier Division, where they remained until 2010.

The club was relegated back to Division One at the end of the 2009–10 season.

After spending most of the 2010–11 and 2011–12 season in the middle part of the table former player Gary Castledine was appointed manager after former manager Micky Taylor left the club to take over at newly formed club AFC Mansfield. However Castledine's reign did not last long; and after 10 games resulting in three wins and seven losses, he was sacked by the club and replaced by formed Sheffield F.C. manager Mark Shaw, who managed to guide the club to a respectable 6th position however during the close season Mark left to take over at Northern Premier League side Worksop Town.

== Stadium ==
The club originally played at Warren Terrace, but later moved to Langwith Road. The record attendance of 2,200 was set in a friendly match against Mansfield Town, a match played as part of the sale of Gary Castledine to Mansfield.

== Honours ==
- Central Midlands Alliance League
  - First Division:
    - Runners-up: 1986–87
  - Senior Division:
    - Champions: 1985–86
  - Supreme Division:
    - Champions: 2000–01, 2001–02
    - Runners-up: 1999–2000
- Northern Counties East League
  - Division One Champions: 2003–04
  - League Cup runners-up: 2011–12
  - League Trophy runners-up 2011–12

== Records ==
- Best FA Cup performance: Third qualifying round, 2003–04
- Best FA Vase performance: Third round, 2002–03
- Attendance: 2,200 vs. Mansfield Town, 1991 (friendly)
- Record league victory: 12–0 vs Clipstone Welfare, 2014 - 12-0 Appleby Frodingham
