= 1955 IRFU college draft =

Third Interprovincial Rugby Football Union sports draft

The 1955 IRFU college draft was the third and final official sports draft held by the Interprovincial Rugby Football Union, a predecessor of the East Division of the Canadian Football League, in the spring of 1955. 41 players were chosen from among eligible players from five eastern universities, McGill University, Queen's University, University of Toronto, University of Western Ontario, and McMaster University. The Ottawa Rough Riders had the first selection, Gino Fracas, in the last draft to feature eastern teams exclusively.

== Round one ==
Pick #	CFL team	Player	Position	University
1	Ottawa Rough Riders	Gino Fracas	HB	Western Ontario
2	Toronto Argonauts	Alex Macklin	T	Toronto
3	Hamilton Tiger-Cats	Don Getty	QB	Western Ontario
4	Montreal Alouettes	Ernie Darragh	HB	McMaster

== Round two ==
Pick #	CFL team	Player	Position	University
5	Ottawa Rough Riders	Bob Pinkney	HB	Toronto
6	Toronto Argonauts	Bob Kimoff	FB	Toronto
7	Hamilton Tiger-Cats	Don Prowse	E	Western Ontario
8	Montreal Alouettes	Lionel Quinn	FB	McGill

== Round three ==
Pick #	CFL team	Player	Position	University
9	Ottawa Rough Riders	Pete Nicholson	T	Queen's
10	Toronto Argonauts	Baz Mackie	G	Toronto
11	Hamilton Tiger-Cats	Hank Zuzek	G	Queen's
12	Montreal Alouettes	Bill Stevenson	QB	Toronto

== Round four ==
Pick #	CFL team	Player	Position	University
13	Ottawa Rough Riders	George Stulac	REC	Toronto
14	Toronto Argonauts	Bill Horton	WB	Toronto
15	Hamilton Tiger-Cats	Jack Cook	REC	Queen's
16	Montreal Alouettes	Herb English	HB	McGill

== Round five ==
Pick #	CFL team	Player	Position	University
17	Ottawa Rough Riders	Murray Henderson	HB	Western Ontario
18	Toronto Argonauts	John Prendergast	OL	Toronto
19	Hamilton Tiger-Cats	Jack Pelech	HB	McMaster
20	Montreal Alouettes	Ed Olszewski	OL	McGill

== Round six ==
Pick #	CFL team	Player	Position	University
21	Ottawa Rough Riders	Bob Turner	REC	Western Ontario
22	Toronto Argonauts	John Sopinka	HB	Toronto
23	Hamilton Tiger-Cats	Bruce Day	OL	Toronto
24	Montreal Alouettes	Norm Dyson	QB	Queen's

== Round seven ==
Pick #	CFL team	Player	Position	University
25	Ottawa Rough Riders	Fred Palermo	OL	Toronto
26	Toronto Argonauts	Jack Strapp	OL	Toronto
27	Hamilton Tiger-Cats	Murray Howlett	FB	McMaster
28	Montreal Alouettes	Norm Levine	OL	Toronto

== Round eight ==
Pick #	CFL team	Player	Position	University
29	Ottawa Rough Riders	Joe O'Brien	OL	Queen's
30	Toronto Argonauts	Mike Yednoez	HB	McMaster
31	Hamilton Tiger-Cats	John Wismer	OL	Toronto
32	Montreal Alouettes	Ross Woods	HB	Toronto

== Round nine ==
Pick #	CFL team	Player	Position	University
33	Ottawa Rough Riders	Jack Rogers	HB	Toronto
34	Toronto Argonauts	Doug Johnson	DL	McMaster
35	Hamilton Tiger-Cats	Wally Mellor	QB	Queens

== Round ten ==
Pick #	CFL team	Player	Position	University
36	Ottawa Rough Riders	Don Marston	REC	Queen's
37	Toronto Argonauts	Hal Blewald	HB	McGill
38	Hamilton Tiger-Cats	Tony Miller	REC	McGill

== Round eleven ==
Pick #	CFL team	Player	Position	University
39	Ottawa Rough Riders	John Hiltz	OL	McGill
40	Toronto Argonauts	Roger Baikie	HB	McGill
41	Hamilton Tiger-Cats	Earl Merling	OL	McGill
