= Bill Stevenson =

Bill Stevenson may refer to:

- Bill Stevenson (businessman), American businessman, first husband of Jill Biden
- Bill Stevenson (American musician) (born 1963), American musician and record producer, associated with The Descendents and Black Flag
- Bill Stevenson (Canadian musician) (born 1947), Canadian blues and jazz pianist, vocalist and songwriter, originally associated with Earth Opera
- Bill Stevenson (offensive lineman) (1951–2007), Canadian football player
- Bill Stevenson (quarterback) (1933-2022), Canadian football player

== See also ==
- Bill Stephenson (1937–2010), Australian rules footballer
- William Stevenson (disambiguation)
- William Stephenson (disambiguation)
