= 2022–23 National League =

National League
- Season: 2022–23
- Dates: 6 August 2022 – 14 May 2023
- Champions: Wrexham
- Promoted: Wrexham; Notts County
- Relegated: AFC Telford United; Bradford (Park Avenue); Cheshunt; Concord Rangers; Dulwich Hamlet; Hungerford Town; Kettering Town; Leamington
- Matches: 1,656
- Goals: 4,480 (2.71 per match)
- Biggest home win: Worthing 7–0 Concord Rangers (7 April 2023)
- Biggest away win: Hampton & Richmond Borough 0–6 St Albans City (1 November 2022); Worthing 0–6 Ebbsfleet United (6 December 2022)
- Highest scoring: Wrexham 7–5 Barnet (8 October 2022)

The 2022–23 National League season, known as the Vanarama National League for sponsorship reasons, was the eighth season under English football's new title of the National League, the nineteenth season consisting of three divisions, and the forty-fourth season overall.

This season saw the expansion of North and South divisions to 24 teams each, a planned increase which was originally scheduled in 2019 to occur ahead of the 2021–22 season. However, after the curtailment and voidance of the 2020–21 season for both North and South, promotion and relegation were postponed. For those reasons, the implementation of expansion plans was delayed until 2022–23.

== National League ==
National League
- Season: 2022–23
- Dates: 6 August 2022 – 13 May 2023
- Champions: Wrexham
- Promoted: Wrexham; Notts County
- Relegated: Torquay United; Yeovil Town; Scunthorpe United; Maidstone United
- Matches: 552
- Goals: 1,540 (2.79 per match)
- Top goalscorer: (England) Macaulay Langstaff (42)
- Biggest home win: Wrexham 6–0 Torquay United (24 September 2022)
- Biggest away win: Barnet 0–5 York City (1 October 2022); Dagenham & Redbridge 0–5 Notts County (3 September 2022); Dorking Wanderers 0–5 Wrexham (3 September 2022); Wealdstone 1–6 Notts County (25 October 2022)
- Highest scoring: Wrexham 7–5 Barnet (8 October 2022)
- Longest unbeaten run: Wrexham (28)
- Highest attendance: Notts County 0-0 Yeovil Town (19 November 2022) (16,511)

=== Team changes ===
To National League

Promoted from 2021–22 National League North

- Gateshead
- York City

Promoted from 2021–22 National League South

- Maidstone United
- Dorking Wanderers

Relegated from 2021–22 League Two

- Scunthorpe United
- Oldham Athletic

From National League

Promoted to 2022–23 League Two

- Stockport County
- Grimsby Town

Relegated to 2022–23 National League North

- King's Lynn Town

Relegated to 2022–23 National League South

- Dover Athletic
- Weymouth

Oldham Athletic is the first former Premier League club to be relegated to the National League, and their matches against Notts County will be the third fixture to be played in all five top tiers of English football.

=== Stadia and locations ===
Locations of the 2022–23 National League clubs (Greater London shown in more detail below)
Locations of the 2022–23 National League clubs (Greater London)

Team	Location	Stadium	Capacity
Aldershot Town	Aldershot	Recreation Ground	7,200
Altrincham	Altrincham	Moss Lane	7,700
Barnet	London (Canons Park)	The Hive Stadium	6,418
Boreham Wood	Borehamwood	Meadow Park	4,502
Bromley	London (Bromley)	Hayes Lane	5,300
Chesterfield	Chesterfield	Technique Stadium	10,504
Dagenham & Redbridge	London (Dagenham)	Victoria Road	6,078
Dorking Wanderers	Dorking	Meadowbank	3,000
Eastleigh	Eastleigh	Ten Acres	5,250
FC Halifax Town	Halifax	The Shay	10,400
Gateshead	Gateshead	Gateshead International Stadium	11,800
Maidenhead United	Maidenhead	York Road	4,000
Maidstone United	Maidstone	Gallagher Stadium	4,200
Notts County	Nottingham	Meadow Lane	19,588
Oldham Athletic	Oldham	Boundary Park	13,513
Scunthorpe United	Scunthorpe	Glanford Park	9,088
Solihull Moors	Solihull	Damson Park	5,500
Southend United	Southend-on-Sea	Roots Hall	12,392
Torquay United	Torquay	Plainmoor	6,500
Wealdstone	London (Ruislip)	Grosvenor Vale	4,085
Woking	Woking	Kingfield Stadium	6,036
Wrexham	Wrexham	Racecourse Ground	10,771
Yeovil Town	Yeovil	Huish Park	9,566
York City	York	York Community Stadium	8,500

=== Personnel and sponsoring ===
Team	Manager	Captain	Kit manufacturer	Shirt sponsor
Aldershot Town	(England) Tommy Widdrington	(Wales) Joe Partington	(Italy) Erreà	Bridges Estate Agents
Altrincham	(England) Phil Parkinson	(England) Jordan Hulme	(Germany) Puma	J Davidson Ltd
Barnet	(Republic of Ireland) Dean Brennan	(Northern Ireland) Dale Gorman	(England) Stanno	TIC Health
Boreham Wood	(England) Luke Garrard	(England) Mark Ricketts	(Germany) Puma	Alan Swan - Wood Army
Bromley	(England) Andy Woodman	(England) Byron Webster	(Germany) Puma	LSP Renewables
Chesterfield	(England) Paul Cook	(England) Jamie Grimes	(Germany) Puma	Leengate Valves
Dagenham & Redbridge	(England) Ben Strevens	(Colombia) Ángelo Balanta	(United States) Nike	West & Coe
Dorking Wanderers	(England) Marc White	(England) Barry Fuller	(Italy) Macron	Stonegate Homes
Eastleigh	(England) Lee Bradbury	(England) Aaron Martin	(Italy) Kappa	Utilita
FC Halifax Town	(England) Chris Millington	(England) Tom Clarke	(Germany) Adidas	CORE Facility Services
Gateshead	(England) Mike Williamson	(England) Greg Olley	(Germany) Puma	Gateshead Central
Maidenhead United	(England) Alan Devonshire	(England) Alan Massey	(Germany) Uhlsport	G&L Scientific
Maidstone United	(Cameroon) George Elokobi	(Trinidad and Tobago) Gavin Hoyte	(Italy) Macron	Manchett
Notts County	(England) Luke Williams	(Scotland) Kyle Cameron	(Germany) Puma	Access Training
Oldham Athletic	(England) David Unsworth	(England) Liam Hogan	(Denmark) Hummel	Bartercard
Scunthorpe United	(England) Jimmy Dean	(England) Liam Feeney	(Italy) Macron	Marshall BMW
Solihull Moors	(England) Neal Ardley	(England) Kyle Storer	(Germany) Adidas	Taxbuddi
Southend United	(Republic of Ireland) Kevin Maher	(England) Nathan Ralph	(Italy) Macron	P G Site Services
Torquay United	(England) Gary Johnson	(England) Asa Hall	(Germany) Puma	(No front shirt sponsor, they have the year they were founded on the front '1899').
Wealdstone	(England) Stuart Maynard	(England) Jack Cook	(Spain) Kelme	GPF Lewis
Woking	(England) Darren Sarll	(England) Josh Casey	(Germany) Adidas	Boz's Fruit & Veg
Wrexham	(England) Phil Parkinson	(England) Luke Young	(Italy) Macron	TikTok
Yeovil Town	(England) Mark Cooper	(England) Josh Staunton	(Denmark) Hummel	Jurassic Fibre
York City	(England) Michael Morton (interim)	(England) Lenell John-Lewis	(Germany) Puma	JMP

=== Managerial changes ===
Team	Outgoing manager	Manner of departure	Date of vacancy	Position in table	Incoming manager	Date of appointment
Yeovil Town	(England) Josh Staunton	End of caretaker spell	15 May 2022	Pre-season	(England) Chris Hargreaves	18 May 2022
FC Halifax Town	(England) Pete Wild	Signed by Barrow	26 May 2022	Pre-season	(England) Chris Millington	28 May 2022
Notts County	(England) Ian Burchnall	Signed by Forest Green Rovers	27 May 2022	Pre-season	(England) Luke Williams	14 June 2022
Scunthorpe United	(England) Keith Hill	Sacked	30 August 2022	23rd	(England) Tony Daws (interim)	1 September 2022
Oldham Athletic	(Republic of Ireland) John Sheridan	Mutual agreement	17 September 2022	14th	(England) David Unsworth	20 September 2022
Aldershot Town	(England) Mark Molesley	Sacked	15 October 2022	22nd	(England) Ross McNeilly	6 December 2022
Yeovil Town	(England) Chris Hargreaves	Sacked	27 October 2022	21st	(England) Mark Cooper	28 October 2022
York City	(England) John Askey	Sacked	16 November 2022	12th	(England) David Webb	2 December 2022
Scunthorpe United	(England) Tony Daws (interim)	Stepped down to Academy Manager	1 December 2022	23rd	(England) Michael Nelson (interim)	1 December 2022
Maidstone United	(England) Hakan Hayrettin	Sacked	9 January 2023	23rd	(Cameroon) George Elokobi	9 January 2023
Scunthorpe United	(England) Michael Nelson (interim)	End of interim spell	29 January 2023	23rd	(England) Jimmy Dean	29 January 2023
York City	(England) David Webb	Sacked	8 February 2023	18th	(England) Michael Morton (interim)	8 February 2023
Dagenham & Redbridge	(Republic of Ireland) Daryl McMahon	Sacked	24 February 2023	10th	(England) Ben Strevens	10 March 2023
Aldershot Town	(England) Ross McNeilly	Sacked	2 April 2023	19th	(England) Tommy Widdrington	2 April 2023

=== National League table ===
Pos	Team	Pld	W	D	L	GF	GA	GD	Pts	Promotion, qualification or relegation
1	Wrexham (C, P)	46	34	9	3	116	43	+73	111	Promotion to EFL League Two
2	Notts County (O, P)	46	32	11	3	117	42	+75	107	Qualification for the National League play-off semi-finals
3	Chesterfield	46	25	9	12	81	52	+29	84	Qualification for the National League play-off semi-finals
4	Woking	46	24	10	12	71	48	+23	82	Qualification for the National League play-off quarter-finals
5	Barnet	46	21	11	14	75	67	+8	74	Qualification for the National League play-off quarter-finals
6	Boreham Wood	46	19	15	12	52	40	+12	72	Qualification for the National League play-off quarter-finals
7	Bromley	46	18	17	11	68	53	+15	71	Qualification for the National League play-off quarter-finals
8	Southend United	46	20	9	17	57	45	+12	69	
9	Eastleigh	46	19	10	17	56	57	−1	67	
10	Dagenham & Redbridge	46	18	9	19	61	72	−11	63	
11	FC Halifax Town	46	16	13	17	49	48	+1	61	
12	Oldham Athletic	46	16	13	17	63	64	−1	61	
13	Wealdstone	46	16	12	18	57	72	−15	60	
14	Gateshead	46	15	15	16	67	62	+5	59 (Note: Gateshead were deducted one point for playing an ineligible player.)	
15	Solihull Moors	46	15	13	18	62	66	−4	58	
16	Dorking Wanderers	46	16	9	21	67	91	−24	57	
17	Altrincham	46	14	14	18	68	82	−14	56	
18	Aldershot Town	46	14	11	21	64	76	−12	53	
19	York City	46	13	12	21	55	63	−8	51	
20	Maidenhead United	46	13	11	22	47	66	−19	50	
21	Torquay United (R)	46	12	12	22	58	80	−22	48	Relegation to National League South
22	Yeovil Town (R)	46	7	19	20	35	60	−25	40	Relegation to National League South
23	Scunthorpe United (R)	46	8	10	28	49	87	−38	34	Relegation to National League North
24	Maidstone United (R)	46	5	10	31	45	104	−59	25	Relegation to National League South

Rules for classification: 1) Points; 2) Goal difference; 3) Number of goals scored; 4) Number of matches won; 5) Head-to-head results
(C) Champions; (O) Play-off winners; (P) Promoted; (R) Relegated

=== Results table ===
Home \ Away	ALD	ALT	BAR	BOR	BRO	CHE	DAG	DOR	EAS	HAL	GAT	MDH	MDS	NOT	OLD	SCU	SOL	SOU	TOR	WEA	WOK	WRE	YEO	YOR
Aldershot Town	—	1–1	3–1	0–1	0–1	1–1	0–2	2–0	0–0	5–1	2–3	1–2	1–3	0–3	1–1	2–1	1–4	2–0	1–1	1–2	1–2	3–4	1–1	2–1
Altrincham	1–0	—	0–2	0–2	1–2	1–2	2–2	4–1	2–1	2–1	0–1	3–2	1–1	0–2	1–0	2–2	4–1	1–0	2–2	0–1	3–1	1–2	2–2	2–1
Barnet	4–1	2–4	—	2–1	1–1	3–0	0–2	0–1	3–1	2–0	1–1	2–1	4–3	1–1	1–3	1–1	1–0	0–3	1–0	2–0	2–0	0–0	2–1	0–5
Boreham Wood	1–2	1–1	1–1	—	0–2	1–0	0–1	1–0	0–0	1–1	0–2	1–0	3–1	2–2	2–1	2–0	1–1	1–0	0–1	1–0	0–1	1–1	1–0	1–1
Bromley	2–2	0–0	1–3	1–1	—	2–0	1–1	2–0	2–1	1–1	1–1	1–1	3–0	1–1	3–0	1–0	4–0	0–0	1–0	3–3	0–2	1–2	4–1	0–3
Chesterfield	1–0	1–0	3–1	2–0	3–2	—	2–3	3–1	3–2	2–0	2–1	1–2	4–0	1–2	0–1	4–1	2–0	3–2	5–1	1–1	1–3	2–0	1–1	1–3
Dagenham & Redbridge	2–1	4–1	5–4	1–1	4–1	0–1	—	0–2	0–1	0–0	2–2	1–0	1–0	0–5	1–1	2–1	2–1	1–1	0–1	4–1	1–2	0–4	0–2	2–1
Dorking Wanderers	0–3	3–2	2–1	1–4	2–3	2–2	5–1	—	1–1	0–0	2–1	3–1	3–2	3–1	1–5	2–1	0–3	1–0	3–2	3–1	1–2	0–5	1–1	1–0
Eastleigh	3–3	3–2	0–2	1–0	0–0	2–1	1–1	4–0	—	1–0	2–5	1–0	5–2	0–2	1–0	2–0	0–0	2–1	1–0	1–0	1–0	0–2	1–1	1–0
FC Halifax Town	2–0	2–2	1–3	1–0	1–1	1–0	2–0	3–1	1–1	—	2–0	0–1	3–0	1–4	2–1	0–1	1–1	0–0	0–1	5–0	0–4	3–1	1–1	1–0
Gateshead	0–2	1–3	2–2	1–1	0–3	1–2	3–0	0–0	1–1	0–0	—	4–0	4–1	1–1	2–1	2–0	1–1	3–1	1–1	0–1	1–3	0–3	4–0	2–2
Maidenhead United	1–1	2–0	1–1	0–1	1–0	0–0	2–1	1–1	2–1	1–1	0–1	—	2–1	3–4	1–1	3–2	0–2	1–2	1–3	0–0	1–0	2–2	2–0	0–1
Maidstone United	0–3	2–3	0–0	0–4	2–3	1–2	0–1	2–4	1–3	1–1	1–1	3–2	—	2–5	0–0	1–1	0–0	0–3	1–0	1–1	1–2	2–3	1–1	2–1
Notts County	2–0	3–1	4–1	1–1	1–1	2–2	1–2	3–1	3–1	1–0	2–0	3–0	3–0	—	4–1	4–0	1–0	4–0	4–0	3–0	3–0	1–0	0–0	1–1
Oldham Athletic	2–1	2–2	0–2	0–2	1–1	0–2	4–2	3–2	3–2	0–1	2–2	1–0	2–0	2–2	—	2–2	1–1	2–0	3–2	1–2	1–0	1–2	2–0	2–0
Scunthorpe United	3–3	2–0	1–3	0–2	1–1	1–2	3–2	3–2	0–1	0–2	3–1	3–0	0–2	1–4	0–2	—	3–4	1–3	0–1	4–1	0–2	1–3	2–1	1–1
Solihull Moors	1–2	5–1	1–1	2–0	2–2	0–0	0–3	3–0	3–0	0–1	0–2	1–1	2–0	1–2	2–1	3–1	—	1–1	3–2	2–1	0–1	1–2	2–2	1–1
Southend United	1–2	2–2	0–1	0–1	0–1	1–2	2–0	2–0	1–3	2–1	1–0	2–0	2–0	2–2	1–0	3–0	3–0	—	1–2	2–1	1–1	0–0	1–0	2–0
Torquay United	6–1	4–4	2–1	0–1	1–2	1–5	1–2	3–3	2–0	1–0	1–1	2–3	1–0	1–2	0–0	1–1	1–4	1–2	—	1–2	1–3	1–1	1–1	3–2
Wealdstone	0–1	4–0	0–2	1–2	3–2	0–4	1–0	2–2	3–1	1–0	1–2	3–2	2–1	1–6	2–2	3–1	3–0	0–1	1–1	—	1–1	0–0	0–0	3–1
Woking	4–1	1–1	1–1	2–2	2–1	0–1	2–0	3–3	1–0	0–1	2–1	2–0	3–1	2–3	3–0	2–0	2–0	1–1	1–1	1–1	—	2–3	1–0	0–2
Wrexham	2–0	4–0	7–5	3–1	2–1	2–1	4–1	3–1	2–1	3–1	3–1	1–0	5–0	3–2	5–1	2–0	5–0	1–0	6–0	3–1	2–2	—	3–0	3–0
Yeovil Town	0–2	1–1	1–2	1–1	0–1	2–2	1–0	0–1	1–0	1–0	3–1	0–0	2–2	1–4	0–3	0–0	1–0	0–2	2–0	0–0	0–1	1–1	—	0–1
York City	2–2	1–2	1–0	1–1	2–1	1–1	1–1	2–1	0–1	0–3	0–3	1–2	4–1	1–3	1–1	0–0	2–3	0–2	1–0	1–2	2–0	1–1	2–1	—

Source: National League Results Grid
Legend: Blue = home team win; Yellow = draw; Red = away team win.
For upcoming matches, an "a" indicates there is an article about the rivalry between the two participants.

=== Play-offs ===
Quarter-finals
5	Barnet	1
6	Boreham Wood	2
4	Woking	1
7	Bromley	2

Semi-finals
2	Notts County (a.e.t.)	3
6	Boreham Wood	2
3	Chesterfield (a.e.t.)	3
7	Bromley	2

Final
2	Notts County (p)	2 (4)
3	Chesterfield	2 (3)

==== Quarter-finals ====
2 May 2023	Barnet	1–2	Boreham Wood	Canons Park
19:45	Pritchard 52'	Report	Ndlovu 19', 45+2'; Marsh (yellow card) 62'; Kelly-Evans (yellow card) 66'	Stadium: The Hive Stadium; Attendance: 2,256; Referee: Daniel Middleton

3 May 2023	Woking	1–2	Bromley	Woking
19:45	Ince 13'	Report	Cheek 60' (pen.); Elerewe (yellow card) 68', (goal) 77'	Stadium: The Laithwaite Community Stadium; Attendance: 5,033; Referee: Lewis Smith

==== Semi-finals ====
7 May 2023	Notts County	3–2 (a.e.t.)	Boreham Wood	Nottingham
12:30	Baldwin 47', 90+7'; Jones 120', (yellow card) 120+2'	Report	Bush (yellow card) 21'; Ilesanmi 37', (yellow card) 109'; Ndlovu 45+3'; Rees (yellow card) 87'; Newton (yellow card) 120+3'	Stadium: Meadow Lane; Attendance: 15,617; Referee: Scott Tallis

7 May 2023	Chesterfield	3–2 (a.e.t.)	Bromley	Chesterfield
15:40	King (yellow card) 45+1'; Palmer (yellow card) 53'; Elerewe 58' (o.g.); Oldaker 80'; Mandeville 103'	Report	Marriott 45+8'; Fisher (yellow card) 65'; Elerewe (red card) 75'; Cheek (yellow card) 34', (goal) 90+9'; Forster (yellow card) 91'; Sowunmi (yellow card) 119'	Stadium: Technique Stadium; Attendance: 9,657; Referee: Scott Simpson

==== Final ====
13 May 2023
15:30 BST

Notts County	2–2 (a.e.t.)	Chesterfield
Bostock 87'; Rodrigues 108'	Report	Dallas 5' (pen.); Dobra 93'
Penalties
Langstaff (penalty scored); Rodrigues (penalty scored); Jones (penalty scored); Bostock (penalty missed); Scott (penalty scored)	4–3	(penalty scored) Banks; (penalty missed) Oldaker; (penalty scored) Maguire; (penalty missed) King; (penalty scored) Quigley

Wembley Stadium, London
Attendance: 38,138
Referee: Matthew Corlett

=== Top scorers ===
Rank	Player	Club	Goals
1	(England) Macaulay Langstaff	Notts County	42
2	(England) Paul Mullin	Wrexham	38
3	(England) Inih Effiong	Dagenham & Redbridge; Aldershot Town	23
4	(Antigua and Barbuda) Rhys Browne	Woking; Wealdstone	20
5	(Scotland) Andrew Dallas	Chesterfield; Solihull Moors	19
5	(England) Nicke Kabamba	Barnet	19
7	(Portugal) Rúben Rodrigues	Notts County	18
8	(England) James McShane	Dorking Wanderers	17

=== Hat-tricks ===
Player	For	Against	Result	Date
(England) Paul Mullin	Wrexham	Maidstone United	5–0	20 August 2022
(England) Alex Reid	Solihull Moors	Altrincham	5–1	3 September 2022
(England) Macaulay Langstaff	Notts County	Dag & Red	0–5	3 September 2022
(England) Ollie Palmer	Wrexham	Dorking Wanderers	0–5	3 September 2022
(England) James McShane	Dorking Wanderers	Notts County	3–1	17 September 2022
(England) Josh Walker	Dag & Red	Barnet	5–4	24 September 2022
(England) Aaron Jarvis	Torquay United	Aldershot Town	6–1	1 November 2022
(England) Paul Mullin	Wrexham	Solihull Moors	5–0	26 December 2022
(England) Shaq Forde	York City	Maidstone United	4–1	7 January 2023
(Cameroon) Mike Fondop	Oldham Athletic	Dorking Wanderers	1–5	7 January 2023
(Northern Ireland) Caolan Lavery	Scunthorpe United	Maidenhead United	3–0	7 January 2023
(England) Inih Effiong	Aldershot Town	Maidstone United	0–3	24 January 2023
(England) Nicke Kabamba	Barnet	Chesterfield	3–0	28 January 2023
(England) Macaulay Langstaff	Notts County	Yeovil Town	1–4	18 February 2023
(England) Paul Mullin	Wrexham	Oldham Athletic	5–1	1 April 2023
(England) Aaron Jarvis	Torquay United	York City	3–2	15 April 2023
(Scotland) Andrew Dallas	Chesterfield	Torquay United	5–1	18 April 2023
(Republic of Ireland) Jim O'Brien	Notts County	Maidstone United	2–5	22 April 2023

=== Monthly awards ===
Each month the Vanarama National League announces their official Player of the Month and Manager of the Month.

Month	Manager of the Month	Club	Player of the Month	Club
August 2022	(England) Paul Cook	Chesterfield	(England) Macaulay Langstaff	Notts County
September 2022	(England) Phil Parkinson	Wrexham	(England) Macaulay Langstaff	Notts County
October 2022	(England) Luke Williams	Notts County	(England) Shaun Hobson	Southend United
November 2022	(England) Darren Sarll	Woking	(England) Jack Cook	Wealdstone
December 2022	(Republic of Ireland) Dean Brennan	Barnet	(Scotland) Kyle Cameron	Notts County
January 2023	(England) Phil Parkinson	Wrexham	(England) Inih Effiong	Aldershot Town
February 2023	(Republic of Ireland) Kevin Maher	Southend United	(England) Charlie Carter	Eastleigh
March 2023	(England) Luke Williams	Notts County	(England) Macaulay Langstaff	Notts County

=== Annual awards ===
Award	Winner	Club
Player of the Season	(England) Macaulay Langstaff	Notts County
Manager of the Season	(England) Phil Parkinson	Wrexham

National League Team of the Season

Pos.	Player	Club	Ref.
GK	(England) Nathan Ashmore	Boreham Wood	
RB	(England) Jeff King	Chesterfield	
CB	(England) Ben Tozer	Wrexham	
CB	(Scotland) Kyle Cameron	Notts County	
LB	(Zimbabwe) Adam Chicksen	Notts County	
CM	(England) Elliot Lee	Wrexham	
CM	(England) Matty Palmer	Notts County	
CM	(Portugal) Rúben Rodrigues	Notts County	
CF	(England) Macaulay Langstaff	Notts County	
CF	(England) Paul Mullin	Wrexham	
CF	(England) Ryan Colclough	Chesterfield	
Manager	(England) Phil Parkinson	Wrexham	

== National League North ==
National League North
- Season: 2022–23
- Dates: 6 August 2022 – 14 May 2023
- Champions: AFC Fylde
- Promoted: AFC Fylde; Kidderminster Harriers
- Relegated: AFC Telford United; Bradford (Park Avenue); Kettering Town; Leamington
- Matches: 552
- Goals: 1,390 (2.52 per match)
- Biggest home win: AFC Fylde 5–0 Banbury United (7 January 2023); Blyth Spartans 5–0 Hereford (29 April 2023); Scarborough Athletic 5–0 Kettering Town (8 October 2022)
- Biggest away win: Gloucester City 2–6 Darlington (10 December 2022); AFC Telford United 0–4 Gloucester City (10 April 2023); AFC Telford United 0–4 King's Lynn Town (20 August 2022); Buxton 0–4 Banbury United (12 November 2022)
- Highest scoring: Boston United 3–5 Southport (6 August 2022); Gloucester City 2–6 Darlington (10 December 2022)

The National League North consisted of 24 teams for the first time.

=== Team changes ===
To National League North

Relegated from 2021–22 National League

- King's Lynn Town

Promoted from 2021–22 Northern Premier League

- Buxton
- Scarborough Athletic

Promoted from 2021–22 Southern Football League

- Banbury United
- Peterborough Sports

From National League North

Promoted to 2022–23 National League

- Gateshead
- York City

Relegated to 2022–23 Northern Premier League

- Guiseley

=== Stadia and locations ===
Locations of the National League North 2022–23 teams

Team	Location	Stadium	Capacity
AFC Fylde	Wesham	Mill Farm	6,000
AFC Telford United	Telford	New Bucks Head	6,300
Alfreton Town	Alfreton	North Street	3,600
Banbury United	Banbury	Spencer Stadium	2,000
Blyth Spartans	Blyth	Croft Park	4,435
Boston United	Boston	Boston Community Stadium	5,061
Brackley Town	Brackley	St. James Park	3,500
Bradford (Park Avenue)	Bradford	Horsfall Stadium	3,500
Buxton	Buxton	The Silverlands	5,200
Chester	Chester	Deva Stadium	6,500
Chorley	Chorley	Victory Park	4,100
Curzon Ashton	Ashton-under-Lyne	Tameside Stadium	4,000
Darlington	Darlington	Blackwell Meadows	3,300
Farsley Celtic	Farsley	The Citadel	3,900
Gloucester City	Gloucester	Meadow Park	3,600
Hereford	Hereford	Edgar Street	5,213
Kettering Town	Kettering	Latimer Park (groundshare with Burton Park Wanderers)	2,400
Kidderminster Harriers	Kidderminster	Aggborough	6,238
King's Lynn Town	King's Lynn	The Walks	8,200
Leamington	Leamington	New Windmill Ground	3,050
Peterborough Sports	Peterborough	Lincoln Road	2,300
Scarborough Athletic	Scarborough	Flamingo Land Stadium	2,833
Southport	Southport	Haig Avenue	6,008
Spennymoor Town	Spennymoor	The Brewery Field	4,300

=== Managerial changes ===
Team	Outgoing manager	Manner of departure	Date of vacancy	Position in table	Incoming manager	Date of appointment
Buxton	(England) Steve Cunningham	Resigned	28 April 2022	Pre-season	(England) Jamie Vermiglio	25 May 2022
Chester	(England) Steve Watson	End of contract	7 May 2022	Pre-season	(England) Calum McIntyre	12 May 2022
Kettering Town	(England) Ian Culverhouse	Mutual Consent	15 May 2022	Pre-season	(Scotland) Lee Glover	17 May 2022
Chorley	(England) Jamie Vermiglio	Resigned	23 May 2022	Pre-season	(England) Andy Preece	28 May 2022
Blyth Spartans	(England) Terry Mitchell	Sacked	9 August 2022	18th	(England) Graham Fenton	16 August 2022
Boston United	(England) Paul Cox	Sacked	6 September 2022	24th	(England) Ian Culverhouse	6 September 2022
Spennymoor Town	(England) Anthony Johnson and (England) Bernard Morley	Sacked	20 September 2022	13th	(England) Jason Ainsley	11 October 2022
Brackley Town	(England) Kevin Wilkin	Sacked	29 September 2022	8th	(England) Roger Johnson	29 September 2022
Gloucester City	(England) Lee Mansell	Sacked	29 September 2022	16th	(England) Steven King	30 September 2022
AFC Fylde	(England) James Rowe	Resigned	29 September 2022	4th	(England) Andy Taylor (interim)	29 September 2022
AFC Telford United	(England) Paul Carden	Sacked	9 October 2022	23rd	(England) Kevin Wilkin	10 October 2022
AFC Fylde	(England) Andy Taylor (interim)	End of interim spell	14 November 2022	8th	(England) Adam Murray	14 November 2022
Buxton	(England) Jamie Vermiglio	Resigned	3 December 2022	18th	(England) Craig Elliott	11 December 2022
Peterborough Sports	(England) Jimmy Dean	Resigned	28 January 2023	13th	(England) Michael Gash and (England) Luke Steele	28 January 2023
Hereford	(England) Josh Gowling	Mutual consent	5 February 2023	15th	(England) Yan Klukowski	28 February 2023
King's Lynn Town	(England) Tommy Widdrington	Resigned	1 April 2023	2nd	(Northern Ireland) Mark Hughes	1 April 2023
Brackley Town	(England) Roger Johnson	Mutual consent	8 April 2023	4th	(England) Gareth Dean (interim)	8 April 2023

=== National League North table ===
Pos	Team	Pld	W	D	L	GF	GA	GD	Pts	Promotion, qualification or relegation
1	AFC Fylde (C, P)	46	29	8	9	80	44	+36	95	Promotion to National League
2	King's Lynn Town	46	27	12	7	84	43	+41	93	Qualification for the National League North play-off semi-finals
3	Chester	46	22	18	6	72	41	+31	84	Qualification for the National League North play-off semi-finals
4	Brackley Town	46	18	15	13	57	47	+10	69	Qualification for the National League North play-off quarter-finals
5	Alfreton Town	46	17	18	11	54	44	+10	69	Qualification for the National League North play-off quarter-finals
6	Kidderminster Harriers (O, P)	46	19	12	15	49	42	+7	69	Qualification for the National League North play-off quarter-finals
7	Gloucester City	46	19	11	16	75	68	+7	68	Qualification for the National League North play-off quarter-finals
8	Scarborough Athletic	46	18	14	14	74	69	+5	68	
9	Spennymoor Town	46	18	14	14	68	67	+1	68	
10	Darlington	46	18	13	15	72	64	+8	67	
11	Buxton	46	18	13	15	55	54	+1	67	
12	Chorley	46	17	15	14	62	50	+12	66	
13	Curzon Ashton	46	18	11	17	58	55	+3	65	
14	Peterborough Sports	46	15	12	19	50	55	−5	57	
15	Boston United	46	15	11	20	68	66	+2	56	
16	Hereford	46	15	10	21	47	56	−9	55	
17	Banbury United	46	13	15	18	55	62	−7	54	
18	Southport	46	13	11	22	50	62	−12	50	
19	Blyth Spartans	46	12	14	20	49	62	−13	50	
20	Farsley Celtic	46	12	14	20	51	75	−24	50	
21	Kettering Town (R)	46	11	16	19	41	63	−22	49	Relegation to the Southern League Premier Division Central
22	Leamington (R)	46	10	18	18	41	60	−19	48	Relegation to the Southern League Premier Division Central
23	Bradford (Park Avenue) (R)	46	11	13	22	43	65	−22	46	Relegation to the Northern Premier League Premier Division
24	AFC Telford United (R)	46	6	14	26	35	76	−41	32	Relegation to the Southern League Premier Division Central

Source: National League official site
Rules for classification: 1) Points; 2) Goal difference; 3) Number of goals scored; 4) Number of matches won; 5) Head-to-head results
(C) Champions; (O) Play-off winners; (P) Promoted; (R) Relegated

=== Results table ===
Home \ Away	FYL	TEL	ALF	BAN	BLY	BOS	BRA	BPA	BUX	CHE	CHO	CUR	DAR	FAR	GLO	HER	KET	KID	KIN	LEA	PET	SCA	SOU	SPE
AFC Fylde	—	3–1	2–0	5–0	0–3	4–1	3–0	3–1	1–0	1–1	1–2	3–1	3–2	3–1	2–0	1–3	2–1	0–2	3–3	5–1	1–0	0–2	1–0	2–2
AFC Telford United	0–3	—	1–2	2–1	0–1	1–2	0–1	4–0	1–1	0–0	1–0	2–3	1–4	1–1	0–4	0–1	1–1	1–2	0–4	1–1	0–1	1–1	1–1	1–1
Alfreton Town	0–1	1–0	—	2–0	1–0	3–1	1–0	0–0	3–0	2–2	0–2	1–2	2–2	1–0	1–2	1–1	2–0	1–1	0–2	2–0	2–2	2–0	4–0	3–2
Banbury United	3–1	1–2	1–1	—	0–0	0–0	0–1	1–0	1–3	2–2	3–0	0–0	0–0	2–2	1–1	3–1	0–3	0–1	0–1	2–2	0–0	2–1	3–1	0–1
Blyth Spartans	0–0	3–0	2–2	1–1	—	1–4	1–1	0–1	0–3	0–2	1–2	2–2	0–0	1–1	2–0	5–0	1–0	0–1	0–0	2–2	1–1	1–2	1–0	1–3
Boston United	0–1	4–1	1–0	0–1	3–0	—	1–0	1–0	3–0	2–3	1–4	0–1	3–1	4–0	2–2	2–4	1–1	2–1	0–2	3–0	0–0	2–2	3–5	1–2
Brackley Town	1–1	1–2	1–1	1–1	1–1	1–0	—	4–1	2–0	1–1	1–1	1–0	3–0	0–3	4–0	2–1	3–0	2–0	1–1	1–2	2–0	2–0	1–0	2–1
Bradford (Park Avenue)	0–2	1–0	3–0	1–0	0–1	2–1	1–2	—	1–4	1–2	0–0	2–1	1–3	1–1	2–1	1–0	1–1	0–1	0–1	3–1	1–2	0–0	2–0	0–1
Buxton	2–2	0–2	0–0	0–4	1–2	1–0	3–1	2–3	—	0–0	2–2	1–0	2–1	2–0	2–1	0–1	2–2	1–1	1–0	1–1	3–0	0–1	1–0	2–1
Chester	0–1	1–1	1–1	4–2	1–0	1–0	2–0	1–0	4–0	—	0–0	2–2	0–1	2–2	1–1	0–1	4–0	2–0	3–3	1–1	0–1	2–2	1–0	1–2
Chorley	0–1	1–0	0–0	1–0	1–1	2–3	0–0	0–0	2–2	2–2	—	3–0	1–1	4–3	3–0	2–0	2–0	1–0	0–1	1–0	1–0	2–3	1–2	2–0
Curzon Ashton	0–2	3–0	0–1	1–2	0–2	2–2	3–1	0–0	2–1	1–2	2–1	—	0–2	5–2	4–3	1–3	1–0	0–1	1–1	0–0	3–0	2–0	1–1	1–0
Darlington	1–2	3–1	3–1	1–2	1–0	3–2	2–2	2–2	1–1	1–2	0–3	0–2	—	1–0	3–1	3–0	2–2	0–0	1–3	1–1	2–0	2–3	0–0	3–2
Farsley Celtic	1–2	0–0	0–0	3–1	0–2	0–2	2–1	2–2	2–1	0–2	0–0	1–1	3–1	—	2–1	1–0	2–0	0–1	2–0	1–1	1–1	2–4	0–3	2–2
Gloucester City	1–2	3–0	1–1	1–1	2–2	2–0	0–1	5–1	0–1	1–1	4–3	0–3	2–6	5–1	—	2–0	2–0	1–1	2–1	1–1	3–1	2–3	3–2	2–0
Hereford	2–1	0–0	0–0	2–3	3–0	1–1	2–2	0–0	2–0	1–2	1–1	0–2	1–2	2–0	1–3	—	1–0	0–1	0–1	0–0	0–1	2–0	2–0	3–3
Kettering Town	0–0	2–0	1–3	0–0	4–2	3–2	1–0	1–1	0–0	0–1	3–3	1–0	0–0	0–0	0–1	2–0	—	0–3	1–0	3–0	0–0	1–1	0–0	2–1
Kidderminster Harriers	0–0	3–0	0–0	0–2	3–1	0–0	1–2	1–1	1–0	0–2	1–0	1–2	1–2	0–2	0–1	1–1	3–0	—	1–1	0–0	2–0	0–1	0–2	4–1
King's Lynn Town	0–1	3–0	3–2	3–1	2–0	2–1	2–1	2–1	1–1	0–1	2–0	2–0	3–0	1–2	1–1	2–1	4–1	3–0	—	1–1	2–1	3–2	3–2	3–0
Leamington	2–1	2–2	1–2	1–0	0–1	0–2	0–0	1–0	0–1	0–0	1–2	4–1	2–1	4–0	1–1	2–0	1–0	0–0	0–3	—	0–2	1–1	2–1	0–1
Peterborough Sports	0–2	3–2	1–2	3–2	4–0	1–1	2–0	1–0	1–1	3–2	0–0	0–0	0–1	1–0	1–2	0–2	1–2	1–2	1–2	3–0	—	0–1	2–1	1–1
Scarborough Athletic	1–2	1–0	2–0	3–3	3–2	1–1	0–0	2–2	0–1	1–3	3–2	0–1	2–5	1–2	0–3	1–0	5–0	4–2	3–3	4–1	2–1	—	0–1	2–2
Southport	1–2	0–0	0–0	1–2	2–1	1–1	2–2	4–1	1–4	1–2	2–1	2–1	1–0	4–0	0–1	0–1	0–0	1–3	1–1	1–0	0–3	1–1	—	1–3
Spennymoor Town	2–1	1–1	0–0	2–1	2–1	3–2	1–1	3–2	0–1	0–3	2–1	0–0	1–1	2–1	3–0	1–0	4–2	1–2	2–2	1–0	3–3	2–2	0–1	—

Source: National League Results Grid
Legend: Blue = home team win; Yellow = draw; Red = away team win.
For upcoming matches, an "a" indicates there is an article about the rivalry between the two participants.

=== Play-offs ===
Quarter-finals
5	Alfreton Town	0
6	Kidderminster Harriers	1
4	Brackley Town	2 (5)
7	Gloucester City	2 (3)

Semi-finals
2	King's Lynn Town	1
6	Kidderminster Harriers	4
3	Chester	0
4	Brackley Town	1

Final
6	Kidderminster Harriers	2
4	Brackley Town	0

==== Quarter-finals ====
2 May 2023	Alfreton Town	0–1	Kidderminster Harriers	Alfreton
19:45		Report	Morgan-Smith 1'	Stadium: North Street; Attendance: 1,921; Referee: Benjamin Wyatt

3 May 2023	Brackley Town	2–2 (a.e.t.) (5–3 p)	Gloucester City	Brackley
19:45	Robinson 71'; Matwasa 80'		Phillips 51'; Spence 90+9'	Stadium: St. James Park; Attendance: 1,624; Referee: Richard Aspinall
	Penalties
	Stead (penalty scored); Rooney (penalty scored); Amantchi (penalty scored); Bates (penalty scored); Walker (penalty scored)		(penalty scored) Obadeyi; (penalty missed) Phillips; (penalty scored) Morgan; (penalty scored) Nugent

==== Semi-finals ====
7 May 2023	King's Lynn Town	1–4	Kidderminster Harriers	King's Lynn
12:30	Stephens 26'		Hemmings 23'; Morgan-Smith 54'; Byrne 61'; Brown 71'	Stadium: The Walks; Attendance: 3,002; Referee: Jamie O'Connor

7 May 2023	Chester	0–1	Brackley Town	Chester
15:30			Carline 79'	Stadium: Deva Stadium; Attendance: 4,479; Referee: Dale Baines

==== Final ====
14 May 2023
15:30

Brackley Town	0–2	Kidderminster Harriers
	Report	Hemmings 13', 60'

St. James Park, Brackley
Attendance: 3,015
Referee: John Mulligan

=== Top scorers ===
Rank	Player	Club	Goals
1	(England) Nick Haughton	AFC Fylde	26
2	(England) Glen Taylor	Spennymoor Town	23
3	(Switzerland) Gold Omotayo	King's Lynn Town	22
4	(England) Connor Hall	Chorley	20
4	(England) Kurt Willoughby	Chester	20
6	(Saint Kitts and Nevis) Jacob Hazel	Darlington	19
7	(England) Tom Peers	Curzon Ashton	17

=== Hat-tricks ===
Player	For	Against	Result	Date
(England) Jack Lambert	Darlington	AFC Telford United	1–4	1 November 2022
(England) Kieran Burton	Scarborough Athletic	Kidderminster Harriers	4–2	1 November 2022
(England) Scott Pollock	Boston United	Leamington	3–0	3 December 2022
(England) Jack Lambert	Darlington	Gloucester City	2–6	10 December 2022
(Saint Kitts and Nevis) Jacob Hazel	Darlington	AFC Telford United	3–1	4 February 2023
(England) Billy Chadwick	Boston United	Farsley Celtic	4–0	7 April 2023
(Wales) Sion Spence	Gloucester City	AFC Telford United	0–4	10 April 2023
(England) Glen Taylor^{4}	Spennymoor Town	Kettering Town	4–2	15 April 2023

=== Monthly awards ===
Each month the Vanarama National League announces their official Player of the Month and Manager of the Month.

Month	Manager of the Month	Club	Player of the Month	Club
August 2022	(England) Tommy Widdrington	King's Lynn Town	(Wales) Morgan Roberts	Banbury United
September 2022	(England) Alun Armstrong	Darlington	(England) Nick Haughton	AFC Fylde
October 2022	(England) Josh Gowling	Hereford	(England) Kieran Phillips	Gloucester City
November 2022	(England) Calum McIntyre	Chester	(England) Jack Lambert	Darlington
December 2022	(England) Jonathan Greening	Scarborough Athletic	(England) Connor Hall	Chorley
January 2023	(England) Adam Murray	AFC Fylde	(England) Dominic McHale	Gloucester City
February 2023	(England) Craig Elliott	Buxton	(The Gambia) Modou Faal	AFC Fylde
March 2023	(England) Michael Gash & (England) Luke Steele	Peterborough Sports	(England) Billy Chadwick	Boston United
April 2023	(England) Russell Penn	Kidderminster Harriers	(Switzerland) Gold Omotayo	King's Lynn Town

=== Annual awards ===
Award	Winner	Club
Player of the Season	(England) Nick Haughton	AFC Fylde
Manager of the Season	(England) Calum McIntyre	Chester

National League North Team of the Season

Pos.	Player	Club	Ref.
GK	(England) Harry Tyrer	Chester	
RB	(England) Aaron Jones	King's Lynn Town	
CB	(England) Alex Whitmore	AFC Fylde	
CB	(England) Josh Coulson	King's Lynn Town	
LB	(England) Danny Preston	Alfreton Town	
CM	(England) Michael Clunan	King's Lynn Town	
CM	(Wales) Declan Weeks	Chester	
CM	(England) Nick Haughton	AFC Fylde	
CF	(England) Kurt Willoughby	Chester	
CF	(England) Glen Taylor	Spennymoor Town	
CF	(Switzerland) Gold Omotayo	King's Lynn Town	
Manager	(England) Calum McIntyre	Chester	

== National League South ==
National League South
- Season: 2022–23
- Dates: 6 August 2022 – 14 May 2023
- Champions: Ebbsfleet United
- Promoted: Ebbsfleet United; Oxford City
- Relegated: Cheshunt; Concord Rangers; Dulwich Hamlet; Hungerford Town
- Matches: 552
- Goals: 1,550 (2.81 per match)
- Biggest home win: Worthing 7–0 Concord Rangers (7 April 2023)
- Biggest away win: Hampton & Richmond Borough 0–6 St Albans City (1 November 2022); Worthing 0–6 Ebbsfleet United (6 December 2022)
- Highest scoring: Ebbsfleet United 7–2 Worthing (7 March 2023); Worthing 4–5 St Albans City (11 February 2023)

The National League South also consisted of 24 teams for the first time.

=== Team changes ===
To National League South

Relegated from 2021–22 National League

- Dover Athletic
- Weymouth

Promoted from 2021–22 Isthmian League

- Worthing
- Cheshunt

Promoted from 2021–22 Southern Football League

- Taunton Town
- Farnborough

From National League South

Promoted to 2022–23 National League

- Maidstone United
- Dorking Wanderers

Relegated to 2022–23 Isthmian League

- Billericay Town

=== Stadia and locations ===
Locations of the National League South 2022–23 teams (Greater London shown in more detail below)
Locations of the National League South 2022–23 teams (Greater London clubs)

Team	Location	Stadium	Capacity
Bath City	Bath (Twerton)	Twerton Park	8,840
Braintree Town	Braintree	Cressing Road	4,085
Chelmsford City	Chelmsford	Melbourne Stadium	3,019
Cheshunt	Cheshunt	Theobalds Lane	3,000
Chippenham Town	Chippenham	Hardenhuish Park	3,000
Concord Rangers	Canvey Island	Thames Road	3,300
Dartford	Dartford	Princes Park	4,100
Dover Athletic	Dover	Crabble Athletic Ground	5,745
Dulwich Hamlet	London (East Dulwich)	Champion Hill	3,000
Eastbourne Borough	Eastbourne	Priory Lane	4,151
Ebbsfleet United	Northfleet	Stonebridge Road	4,800
Farnborough	Farnborough	Cherrywood Road	7,000
Hampton & Richmond	London (Hampton)	Beveree Stadium	3,500
Havant & Waterlooville	Havant	West Leigh Park	5,300
Hemel Hempstead Town	Hemel Hempstead	Vauxhall Road	3,152
Hungerford Town	Hungerford	Bulpit Lane	2,500
Oxford City	Oxford (Marston)	Court Place Farm	2,000
Slough Town	Slough	Arbour Park	2,000
St Albans City	St Albans	Clarence Park	4,500
Taunton Town	Taunton	Wordsworth Drive	2,500
Tonbridge Angels	Tonbridge	Longmead Stadium	3,000
Welling United	London (Welling)	Park View Road	4,000
Weymouth	Weymouth	Bob Lucas Stadium	6,600
Worthing	Worthing	Woodside Road	4,000

=== Managerial changes ===
Team	Outgoing manager	Manner of departure	Date of vacancy	Position in table	Incoming manager	Date of appointment
Tonbridge Angels	(England) Steve McKimm	Sacked	4 May 2022	Pre-season	(England) Jay Saunders	9 May 2022
Braintree Town	(Northern Ireland) Ryan Maxwell	Mutual consent	11 May 2022	Pre-season	(England) Angelo Harrop	22 May 2022
Dartford	(England) Steve King	Sacked	24 May 2022	Pre-season	(England) Alan Dowson	31 May 2022
Dulwich Hamlet	(England) Gavin Rose	Sacked	11 September 2022	21st	(England) Paul Barnes	21 October 2022
Weymouth	(England) David Oldfield	Mutual consent	14 September 2022	24th	(England) Bobby Wilkinson	15 September 2022
St Albans City	(England) Ian Allinson	Mutual consent	29 September 2022	15th	(England) David Noble (Note: Noble originally appointed interim head coach before being given the role permanently on 19 November 2022)	29 September 2022
Concord Rangers	(England) Chris Search	Mutual consent	16 October 2022	22nd	(England) Rob Small	18 October 2022
Slough Town	(England) Neil Baker and (England) Jon Underwood	Resigned	14 November 2022	18th	(Republic of Ireland) Scott Davies	23 November 2022
Hemel Hempstead Town	(England) Mark Jones	Mutual consent	30 December 2022	15th	(England) Bradley Quinton	30 December 2022
Hampton & Richmond Borough	(England) Gary McCann	Mutual consent	2 January 2023	19th	(England) Mel Gwinnett	13 January 2023
Dover Athletic	(England) Andy Hessenthaler	Mutual consent	5 January 2023	15th	(England) Mitch Brundle	16 January 2023
Dulwich Hamlet	(England) Paul Barnes	Mutual consent	1 March 2023	19th	(England) Hakan Hayrettin	2 March 2023
Havant & Waterlooville	(England) Paul Doswell	Move to Boardroom	10 March 2023	5th	(England) Jamie Collins	10 March 2023

=== National League South table ===
Pos	Team	Pld	W	D	L	GF	GA	GD	Pts	Promotion, qualification or relegation
1	Ebbsfleet United (C, P)	46	32	7	7	110	47	+63	103	Promotion to National League
2	Dartford	46	25	8	13	82	50	+32	83	Qualification for the National League South play-off semi-finals
3	Oxford City (O, P)	46	21	15	10	83	56	+27	78	Qualification for the National League South play-off semi-finals
4	Worthing	46	22	12	12	92	72	+20	78	Qualification for the National League South play-off quarter-finals
5	Chelmsford City	46	23	9	14	67	49	+18	78	Qualification for the National League South play-off quarter-finals
6	St Albans City	46	22	9	15	72	51	+21	75	Qualification for the National League South play-off quarter-finals
7	Braintree Town	46	20	14	12	66	55	+11	74	Qualification for the National League South play-off quarter-finals
8	Eastbourne Borough	46	22	5	19	74	66	+8	71	
9	Tonbridge Angels	46	20	10	16	68	69	−1	70	
10	Havant & Waterlooville	46	19	12	15	80	70	+10	69	
11	Bath City	46	19	10	17	64	57	+7	67	
12	Farnborough	46	19	9	18	59	52	+7	66	
13	Chippenham Town	46	15	17	14	57	66	−9	62	
14	Taunton Town	46	17	10	19	50	55	−5	61	
15	Hemel Hempstead Town	46	15	15	16	49	57	−8	60	
16	Welling United	46	15	14	17	57	63	−6	58 (Note: Welling United were deducted one point for playing an ineligible player.)	
17	Hampton & Richmond Borough	46	15	9	22	59	71	−12	54	
18	Slough Town	46	13	12	21	58	78	−20	51	
19	Weymouth	46	14	6	26	59	78	−19	48	
20	Dover Athletic	46	12	12	22	42	68	−26	48	
21	Dulwich Hamlet (R)	46	13	9	24	61	89	−28	48	Relegation to the Isthmian League Premier Division
22	Concord Rangers (R)	46	12	8	26	45	85	−40	44	Relegation to the Isthmian League Premier Division
23	Cheshunt (R)	46	11	10	25	48	74	−26	43	Relegation to the Isthmian League Premier Division
24	Hungerford Town (R)	46	10	10	26	48	72	−24	40	Relegation to the Southern League Premier Division South

Source: National League official site
Rules for classification: 1) Points; 2) Goal difference; 3) Number of goals scored; 4) Number of matches won; 5) Head-to-head results
(C) Champions; (O) Play-off winners; (P) Promoted; (R) Relegated

=== Results table ===
Home \ Away	BAT	BRA	CHE	CHS	CHI	CON	DAR	DOV	DUL	EAS	EBB	FAR	HAM	HAV	HEM	HUN	OXF	SLO	STA	TAU	TON	WEL	WEY	WOR
Bath City	—	3–1	0–1	1–0	1–3	4–0	0–2	0–1	2–1	2–0	1–3	0–1	1–1	2–0	1–0	2–3	2–1	5–1	1–3	0–2	0–1	1–1	2–1	2–2
Braintree Town	2–1	—	2–2	1–1	1–1	1–0	1–1	1–3	3–2	2–0	3–2	0–0	1–0	1–1	3–1	3–2	0–0	1–1	1–0	0–2	2–0	4–1	0–0	2–1
Chelmsford City	0–2	2–0	—	2–0	0–1	1–0	1–0	0–0	5–1	5–0	0–1	3–2	0–2	3–4	2–1	5–1	1–0	2–0	1–1	1–2	1–0	0–1	3–1	4–2
Cheshunt	2–1	0–5	1–2	—	3–2	4–2	1–3	2–0	0–3	1–0	1–0	0–1	3–2	2–3	0–0	0–1	1–2	1–1	1–2	0–0	3–4	1–1	1–0	0–2
Chippenham Town	0–0	1–2	0–0	4–4	—	2–2	2–1	3–1	2–1	1–1	0–0	2–1	2–1	0–3	0–1	1–0	1–0	0–1	1–1	3–1	2–2	3–2	3–2	1–1
Concord Rangers	0–2	1–3	1–2	1–1	3–1	—	3–2	1–0	1–1	2–4	1–2	0–1	2–0	3–4	2–1	1–0	1–2	0–2	1–2	1–0	1–0	1–1	0–5	1–1
Dartford	0–0	4–1	1–2	2–1	2–0	3–1	—	2–1	4–0	2–1	4–0	3–1	2–1	1–2	1–3	2–0	0–0	1–0	2–1	0–1	2–0	5–1	3–0	1–2
Dover Athletic	0–0	3–1	0–0	0–3	1–1	0–3	1–3	—	1–2	2–1	1–2	1–1	0–3	1–0	4–0	1–0	1–5	3–0	1–1	1–0	1–2	0–0	0–2	0–3
Dulwich Hamlet	1–2	2–1	2–1	1–0	0–1	0–0	1–2	1–1	—	1–3	1–3	1–4	3–2	2–1	1–3	2–1	2–2	1–2	1–0	2–0	1–2	1–2	2–0	0–1
Eastbourne Borough	3–4	1–2	2–2	3–0	2–1	2–1	2–1	3–1	2–1	—	2–3	2–0	0–1	1–3	3–0	3–1	1–1	2–0	1–0	0–3	1–2	0–1	5–1	0–2
Ebbsfleet United	3–1	4–0	2–0	3–0	3–0	4–1	1–4	3–0	4–2	0–2	—	4–2	6–2	2–0	0–0	5–0	3–0	2–0	3–1	5–0	1–2	1–1	4–1	7–2
Farnborough	0–1	0–1	0–1	3–0	0–1	2–1	3–1	3–0	1–1	0–0	2–2	—	2–2	2–2	1–2	2–1	2–1	4–1	1–2	1–0	1–2	0–0	3–1	0–1
Hampton & Richmond Borough	1–1	0–3	2–1	2–1	1–0	3–0	0–0	0–2	2–0	3–2	1–2	0–1	—	2–3	1–1	2–0	1–1	0–1	0–6	3–1	0–1	1–1	2–1	0–0
Havant & Waterlooville	2–2	3–1	3–0	1–1	1–1	2–0	1–3	4–2	5–1	1–2	0–1	1–0	1–1	—	2–0	4–1	0–1	3–1	1–2	3–2	1–1	0–3	2–2	1–5
Hemel Hempstead Town	1–0	1–1	0–0	0–1	1–1	3–0	0–2	0–0	1–1	1–2	1–1	1–0	2–0	2–0	—	3–2	0–3	1–1	1–3	1–1	1–0	2–3	2–1	1–1
Hungerford Town	1–2	2–1	1–1	1–2	1–1	0–1	1–1	1–0	1–1	2–0	0–1	1–1	0–1	1–1	3–0	—	1–3	2–1	3–0	0–1	0–1	0–0	1–1	0–0
Oxford City	3–3	2–2	3–1	1–0	5–3	5–0	1–1	3–1	2–2	1–3	1–1	1–2	2–0	1–1	2–2	2–0	—	1–3	2–1	2–1	4–0	3–0	3–1	3–0
Slough Town	0–3	1–1	0–2	3–1	6–1	0–0	1–2	1–1	4–3	1–5	0–1	2–0	2–1	1–3	0–2	4–0	2–2	—	1–3	1–0	1–1	0–3	2–3	1–1
St Albans City	3–0	0–2	3–0	1–1	1–1	1–0	1–1	1–0	1–2	2–3	1–2	2–0	2–1	2–0	2–1	0–0	0–1	1–2	—	0–0	2–3	3–0	3–2	0–1
Taunton Town	1–1	0–0	0–0	1–0	3–1	1–0	2–1	0–1	1–1	1–2	0–1	0–2	1–3	2–0	1–2	0–3	1–1	2–1	0–1	—	4–1	0–0	1–3	3–2
Tonbridge Angels	1–2	0–0	1–0	1–0	2–0	2–2	0–1	4–0	3–1	3–0	1–1	2–1	1–4	1–1	1–1	4–3	2–2	3–3	1–2	2–3	—	0–1	0–5	2–1
Welling United	1–0	0–2	1–2	2–1	1–1	0–1	2–2	1–1	2–4	1–0	3–2	1–2	3–0	2–2	0–1	1–0	5–0	0–0	0–3	0–1	2–1	—	1–2	2–4
Weymouth	1–0	1–0	1–2	0–0	0–1	1–2	3–1	0–2	2–1	0–1	2–3	0–1	2–1	0–2	0–0	2–5	0–2	2–0	0–0	1–3	1–3	2–1	—	0–3
Worthing	2–3	2–1	1–3	3–2	0–0	7–0	3–0	1–1	6–0	1–1	0–6	1–2	4–3	3–2	3–1	2–1	1–0	2–2	4–5	1–1	3–2	3–2	1–3	—

Source: National League Results Grid
Legend: Blue = home team win; Yellow = draw; Red = away team win.
For upcoming matches, an "a" indicates there is an article about the rivalry between the two participants.

=== Play-offs ===
Quarter-finals
5	Chelmsford City	0
6	St Albans City	1
4	Worthing	2
7	Braintree Town	1

Semi-finals
2	Dartford	1 (3)
6	St Albans City	1 (5)
3	Oxford City	2
4	Worthing	0

Final
6	St Albans City	0
3	Oxford City	4

==== Quarter-finals ====
2 May 2023	Chelmsford City	0–1 (a.e.t.)	St Albans City	Chelmsford
19:30			Jeffers 95'	Stadium: Melbourne Stadium; Attendance: 2,346; Referee: Farai Hallam

3 May 2023	Worthing	2–1	Braintree Town	Worthing
19:45	Rodari 2'; Sims 56' (o.g.)	Report	Reynolds 9'	Stadium: Woodside Road; Attendance: 2,678; Referee: Stephen Parkinson

==== Semi-finals ====
7 May 2023	Dartford	1–1 (a.e.t.) (3–5 p)	St Albans City	Dartford, Kent
12:30	Bradbury 12'		Francis-Clarke 41'	Stadium: Princes Park; Attendance: 3,234; Referee: Ruebyn Ricardo
	Penalties
	Carruthers (penalty missed); Coulson (penalty scored); Sheringham (penalty scored); Murtagh (penalty scored)		(penalty scored) Jeffers; (penalty scored) McConnell; (penalty scored) Banton; (penalty scored) Cooper; (penalty scored) Neal

7 May 2023	Oxford City	2–0	Worthing	Marston, Oxford
15:30	McEachran 25'; Potter 45'	Report		Stadium: Court Place Farm; Attendance: 2,017; Referee: Dean Watson

==== Final ====
14 May 2023	Oxford City	4–0	St Albans City	Marston, Oxford
12:30	Fleet 3'; McEachran 14'; Ashby 30'; Parker 45+1'	Report		Stadium: Court Place Farm; Attendance: 3,100; Referee: Ben Atkinson

=== Top scorers ===
Rank	Player	Club	Goals
1	(Saint Lucia) Dominic Poleon	Ebbsfleet United	36
2	(England) Shaun Jeffers	St Albans City	27
3	(England) Ollie Pearce	Worthing	24
4	(England) Muhammadu Faal	Havant & Waterlooville	21
5	(England) Bradley Ash	Weymouth	18
5	(England) Scott Wilson	Bath City	18
7	(England) Jordan Greenidge	Tonbridge Angels; Hemel Hempstead Town	17
8	(England) Rakish Bingham	Ebbsfleet United	16
8	(Greece) Klaidi Lolos	Oxford City	16
8	(Antigua and Barbuda) Josh Parker	Oxford City	16

=== Hat-tricks ===
Player	For	Against	Result	Date
(England) Cody Cooke	Bath City	Slough Town	5–1	29 August 2022
(England) Ade Azeez	Welling United	Oxford City	5–0	3 September 2022
(England) Ken Charles	Cheshunt	Chippenham Town	3–2	8 November 2022
(Australia) Callum Kealy	Worthing	Havant & Waterlooville	1–5	3 December 2022
(England) Bradley Ash	Weymouth	Tonbridge Angels	0–5	10 December 2022
(England) Shaun Jeffers	St Albans City	Chelmsford City	3–0	10 December 2022
(England) Joe Iaciofano	Oxford City	Chippenham Town	5–3	13 December 2022
(England) Liam Vincent	Hampton & Richmond Borough	Worthing	4–3	26 December 2022
(Saint Lucia) Dominic Poleon	Ebbsfleet United	Weymouth	4–1	7 January 2023
(England) George Alexander	Welling United	Slough Town	0–3	18 February 2023
(England) Joe Hanks	Chippenham Town	Cheshunt	4–4	18 February 2023
(Saint Lucia) Dominic Poleon	Ebbsfleet United	Hampton & Richmond Borough	6–2	18 February 2023
(Saint Lucia) Dominic Poleon^{4}	Ebbsfleet United	Dulwich Hamlet	4–2	18 March 2023
(England) Tommy Willard	Farnborough	Slough Town	4–1	21 March 2023
(England) George Alexander^{4}	Slough Town	Chippenham Town	6–1	7 April 2023
(Saint Lucia) Dominic Poleon	Ebbsfleet United	Oxford City	3–0	7 April 2023
(England) Stefan Payne	Welling United	Ebbsfleet United	3–2	22 April 2023
(England) Ross Stearn	Taunton Town	Worthing	3–2	22 April 2023
(England) Toby Edser	Ebbsfleet United	Hungerford Town	5–0	29 April 2023

=== Monthly awards ===
Each month the Vanarama National League announces their official Player of the Month and Manager of the Month.

Month	Manager of the Month	Club	Player of the Month	Club
August 2022	(Germany) Dennis Kutrieb	Ebbsfleet United	(England) Jake McCarthy	Havant & Waterlooville
September 2022	(England) Paul Doswell	Havant & Waterlooville	(England) Chris Solly	Ebbsfleet United
October 2022	(England) Alan Dowson	Dartford	(England) Charlie Ruff	Chelmsford City
November 2022	(England) Danny Bloor	Eastbourne Borough	(England) Tafari Moore	St Albans City
December 2022	(England) Craig Edwards	Cheshunt	(England) Jayden Clarke	Dulwich Hamlet
January 2023	(England) Adam Hinshelwood	Worthing	(Antigua and Barbuda) Josh Parker	Oxford City
February 2023	(Germany) Dennis Kutrieb	Ebbsfleet United	(Saint Lucia) Dominic Poleon	Ebbsfleet United
March 2023	(England) Gary Horgan	Chippenham Town	(England) Jake Gray	Hampton & Richmond Borough

=== Annual awards ===
Award	Winner	Club
Player of the Season	(Saint Lucia) Dominic Poleon	Ebbsfleet United
Manager of the Season	(Germany) Dennis Kutrieb	Ebbsfleet United

National League South Team of the Season

Pos.	Player	Club	Ref.
GK	(England) Jack Bycroft	Taunton Town	
RB	(England) Chris Solly	Ebbsfleet United	
CB	(England) Kevin Lokko	Farnborough	
CB	(Scotland) Tom Bonner	Dartford	
LB	(England) Tafari Moore	St Albans City	
CM	(Republic of Ireland) Samir Carruthers	Dartford	
CM	(England) Zac McEachran	Oxford City	
CM	(England) Christian N'Guessan	Ebbsfleet United	
CF	(England) Shaun Jeffers	St Albans City	
CF	(Saint Lucia) Dominic Poleon	Ebbsfleet United	
CF	(England) Muhammadu Faal	Havant & Waterlooville	
Manager	(Germany) Dennis Kutrieb	Ebbsfleet United	
