= William Stevenson =

William Stevenson may refer to:

== Arts and entertainment ==
- Sir William Stevenson (poet) (1530–1575), English poet
- William Grant Stevenson (1849–1919), Scottish sculptor and painter
- William Stevenson (songwriter) (born 1937), American songwriter and record producer

== Law and politics ==
- Sir William Stevenson (colonial administrator) (1805–1863), Jamaican-born governor of Mauritius
- William E. Stevenson (1820–1883), American politician, governor of West Virginia
- William Francis Stevenson (1861–1942), U.S. congressman from South Carolina
- William Stevenson (New Zealand politician, born 1864) (1864–1935), member of the New Zealand Legislative Council
- William Ernest Stevenson (born 1870s), Northern Irish senator
- William H. Stevenson (1891–1978), U.S. congressman from Wisconsin
- William Stevenson (New Zealand politician, born 1901) (1901–1983), New Zealand industrialist and philanthropist
- William Stevenson (judge) (1934–2021), Canadian Supreme Court justice
- William Stevenson (Canadian politician), Canadian member of parliament
- William D. Stevenson (1847–1914), American politician from New York

== Religion ==
- William Stevenson (Scottish writer) (1772–1829), Scottish nonconformist preacher and writer
- William Stevenson (minister) (1805–1873), Scottish minister and antiquarian
- William Stevenson (bishop) (1878–1945), Australian Anglican bishop

== Sports ==
- William Stevenson (athlete) (1900–1985), U.S. Olympic athlete, lawyer, and ambassador
- William Stevenson (canoeist) (1923–1992), Canadian canoeist
- Willie Stevenson (baseball) (fl. 1940s), American baseball player
- Willie Stevenson (1939–2025), Scottish football player and manager
- William Stevenson (goalkeeper) (c. 1906–?), Scottish footballer
- William Stevenson (rugby union) (1897–1972), Scottish rugby union player
- Bill Stevenson (quarterback) (William Griffith Stevenson, 1933–2022), Canadian football player

== Others ==
- William Stevenson (physician) (c. 1719–1783), Irish physician
- William Stevenson (publisher) (1741–1821), English publisher and author
- William Bennet Stevenson (c. 1787 – after 1830), British explorer of South America
- William Stevenson (Canadian writer) (1924–2013), British-born Canadian journalist
- Bill Stevenson (businessman) (William W. Stevenson III, born 1948), American businessman
- W. H. Stevenson (William Henry Stevenson, 1858–1924), English historian and philologist

== See also ==
- Bill Stevenson (disambiguation)
- William Stephenson (disambiguation)
