= Pelech =

Pelech is a surname. Notable people with the surname include:

- Adam Pelech (born 1994), Canadian ice hockey player
- Jack Pelech (1934–2008), Canadian lawyer
- Matt Pelech (born 1987), Canadian ice hockey player

Pelech may also refer to:

- Pelech (school), high school in Jerusalem
- Pelekh, kibbutz in northern Israel

== See also ==
- Pelechy
