= William Henry Stevenson =

William Henry Stevenson may refer to:

- William H. Stevenson (1891–1978), a member of the United States House of Representatives
- W. H. Stevenson (1858–1924), English historian and philologist

== See also ==
- William Stevenson (disambiguation)
