= National League North =

English football league

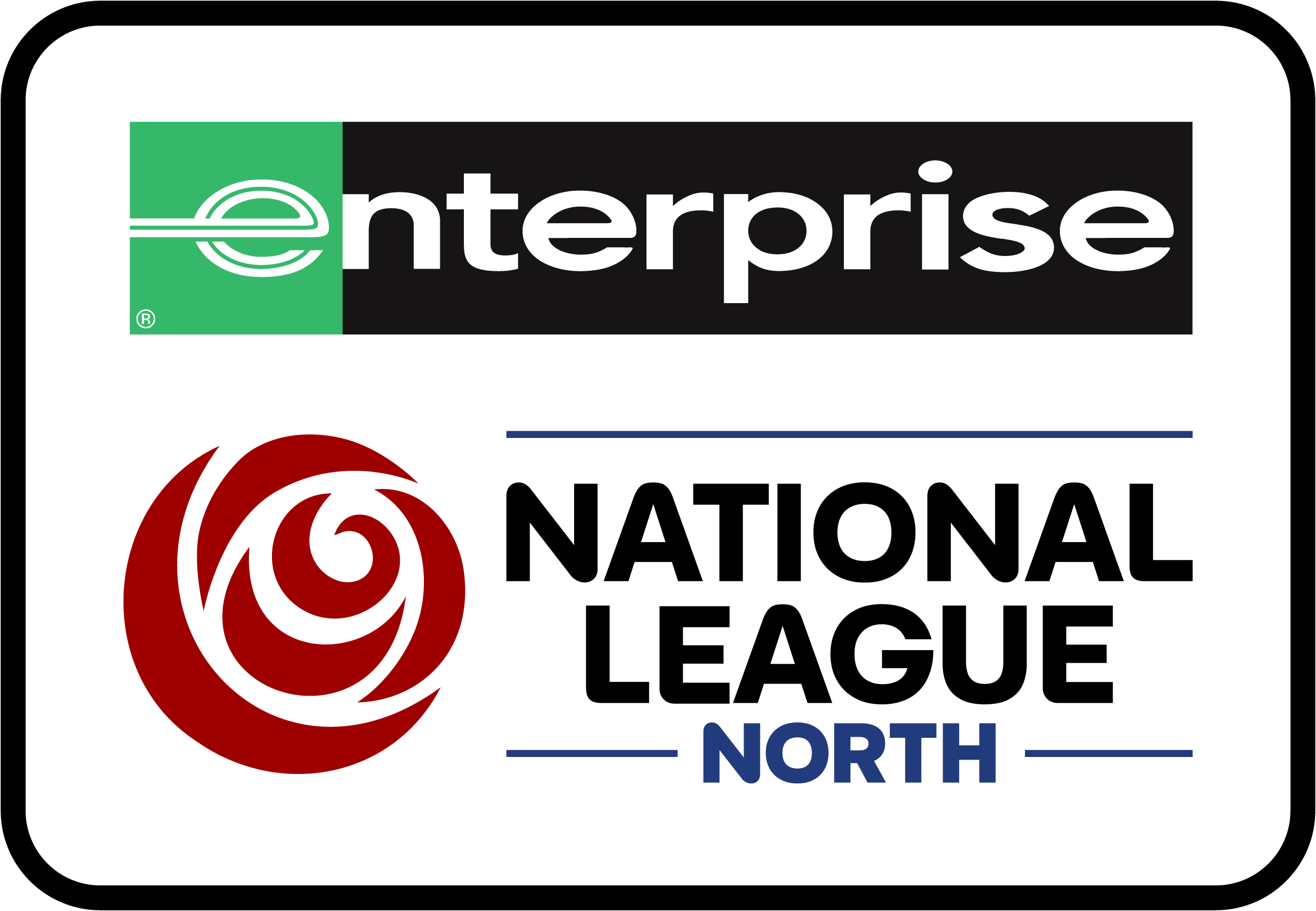
- Founded: 2004
- Country: England
- Other club from: Wales
- Number of clubs: 24
- Level on pyramid: 6 Step 2 (National League System)
- Promotion to: National League
- Relegation to: Northern Premier League Premier Division; Southern Football League Premier Division Central or South
- Domestic cup(s): FA Cup; FA Trophy
- International cup(s): UEFA Europa League (via FA Cup)
- Current champions: AFC Fylde (3rd title) (2025–26)
- Most championships: AFC Fylde; (3 titles)
- Website: National League
- Current: 2026–27 National League North

The National League North is a professional association football league in England. National League North is the second division of the National Leagues and step 2 of the NLS and sixth-highest tier overall in the English football league system, after the Premier League, the EFL leagues and the National League and is contested by 24 clubs.

National League North consists of teams mostly located in Northern England, the English Midlands and East Anglia. In addition, it can include a small number of teams from the northernmost parts of the South West England and South East England regions, as well as currently containing a team from Wales. Since the start of the 2015–16 season, the league has been known as the National League North.

== History ==
The Conference North was introduced in 2004 as part of a major restructuring of English non-League football. The champions are automatically promoted to the National League. A second promotion place goes to the winners of play-offs involving the teams finishing in second to seventh place (expanded from four to six teams in the 2017–18 season). The three bottom clubs are relegated to Step 3 leagues. Teams from this division, as well as from the National League South, enter the FA Cup at the Second Qualifying Round.

The National League North was scheduled to expand to 24 teams in 2021. Due to the COVID-19 pandemic in England, the 2020–21 National League North season was curtailed and voided after written resolutions were put to a vote. No teams were relegated. Expansion was implemented before the 2022–23 season, when the bottom club was relegated and four promoted from Step 3.

== Member clubs for 2026–27 ==
The member clubs for the 2026–27 season are as follows:

Division of Level 6 teams by English Counties (2022–23)

Club	Finishing position 2025–26
AFC Telford United	11th
Bedford Town	18th
Brackley Town	21st (National League)
Buxton	5th
Chester	7th
Chorley	15th
Darlington	9th
Harborough Town	1st (Southern League Central)
Hebburn Town	1st (Northern Premier League)
Hednesford Town	2nd (Northern Premier League)
Hereford	20th
King's Lynn Town	19th
Macclesfield	4th
Marine	12th
Merthyr Town	8th
Morecambe	22nd (National League)
Oxford City	17th
Radcliffe	13th
Scarborough Athletic	6th
Southport	14th
South Shields	2nd
Spalding United	2nd (Southern League Central)
Spennymoor Town	10th
Worksop Town	16th

== League champions ==
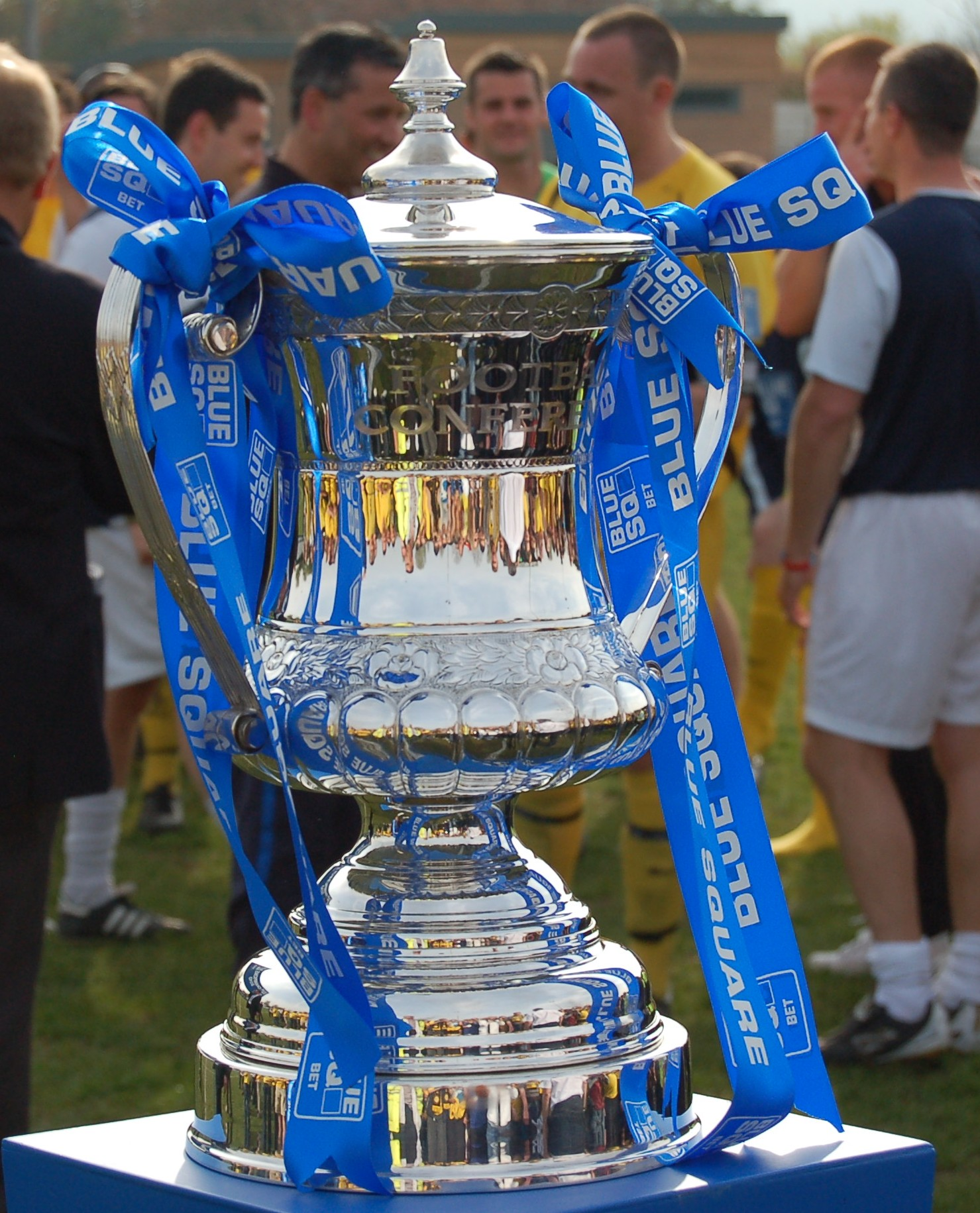
Conference North Trophy awarded to Southport, 2009–10 season.

The winners of the league title and the winners of the play-off final since the league's formation in 2004 are as follows:

Season	Winner	Play-off winner
2004–05	Southport	Altrincham
2005–06	Northwich Victoria	Stafford Rangers
2006–07	Droylsden	Farsley Celtic
2007–08	Kettering Town	Barrow
2008–09	Tamworth	Gateshead
2009–10	Southport (2)	Fleetwood Town
2010–11	Alfreton Town	AFC Telford United
2011–12	Hyde United	Nuneaton Town
2012–13	Chester	FC Halifax Town
2013–14	AFC Telford United	Altrincham
2014–15	Barrow	Guiseley
2015–16	Solihull Moors	North Ferriby United
2016–17	AFC Fylde	FC Halifax Town
2017–18	Salford City	Harrogate Town
2018–19	Stockport County	Chorley
2019–20	King's Lynn Town	Altrincham
2020–21	None, season curtailed and voided	
2021–22	Gateshead	York City
2022–23	AFC Fylde (2)	Kidderminster Harriers
2023–24	Tamworth (2)	Boston United
2024–25	Brackley Town	Scunthorpe United
2025–26	AFC Fylde (3)	Kidderminster Harriers

== League stadiums for 2026–27 ==
The home stadiums for all of the teams in the league for the 2026–27 season are listed below:

Locations of the National League North 2026–27 teams

Team	Location	Stadium	Capacity
AFC Telford United	Telford	New Bucks Head	6,300
Bedford Town	Bedford	The Eyrie	3,000
Brackley Town	Brackley	St. James Park	3,500
Buxton	Buxton	The Silverlands	5,200
Chester	Chester	Deva Stadium	5,400
Chorley	Chorley	Victory Park	4,100
Darlington	Darlington	Blackwell Meadows	3,300
Harborough Town	Market Harborough	Bowden Park	2,400
Hebburn Town	Hebburn	The Green Energy Sports Ground	3,000
Hednesford Town	Hednesford	Keys Park	6,039
Hereford	Hereford	MandM Edgar Street Stadium	5,250
King's Lynn Town	King's Lynn	The Walks	8,200
Macclesfield	Macclesfield	Leasing.com Stadium	5,300
Marine	Crosby	Rossett Park	3,000
Merthyr Town	Merthyr Tydfil	Penydarren Park	4,000
Morecambe	Morecambe	Halo Aerospace Stadium	6,476
Oxford City	Oxford (Marston)	Marsh Lane	3,500
Radcliffe	Radcliffe	Stainton Park	3,500
Scarborough Athletic	Scarborough	Scarborough Sports Village	3,251
South Shields	South Shields	Mariners Park	4,000
Southport	Southport	Haig Avenue	6,008
Spalding United	Spalding	Sir Halley Stewart Field	2,700
Spennymoor Town	Spennymoor	The Brewery Field	4,300
Worksop Town	Worksop	Sandy Lane	3,400

== League records ==
Record home win	Chorley 9-0 Gloucester City, 4 September 2021
Record away win	Redditch United 0–9 Boston United, 21 August 2010
Highest-scoring game	AFC Fylde 9–2 Boston United, 19 November 2016
Most points in a season	107 points – Chester (2012–13)
Most wins in a season	34 – Chester (2012–13)
Fewest defeats in a season	3 – Chester (2012–13)
Most goals scored in a season	112 – AFC Fylde (2025–26)
Largest positive goal difference	71 – Chester (2012–13)
Most league titles	3 – AFC Fylde (2016–17, 2022–23, 2025-26)
Most consecutive wins	15 games (21 February 2006 to 22 April 2006) – Northwich Victoria
Most consecutive clean sheets	10 games (30 August 2010 to 9 November 2010) – Boston United
Most clean sheets in a season	28 (2021/22) - Brackley Town
Longest unbeaten run	30 games (15 September 2012 to 6 April 2013) – Chester
Largest attendance	9,086 (18 May 2025) – Scunthorpe United (vs Chester)

== Sponsorship ==
In June 2025, the league was renamed to the Enterprise National League North after the sponsorship deal with Vanarama ended upon completion of the 2024–25 season.

== See also ==
- National League
- National League South
