= Bob Pinkney =

Canadian football player (1934–2017)

Profile
- Positions: FW, Halfback

Personal information
- Born: 1934
- Died: October 25, 2017 (aged 82–83); Toronto, Ontario, Canada
- Listed height: 6 ft 0 in (1.83 m)
- Listed weight: 178 lb (81 kg)

Career information
- High school: Humberside (Toronto)
- University: Toronto
- CFL draft: 1955: 2nd round, 5th overall pick

Career history
- 1955–1957: Ottawa Rough Riders

Robert Pinkney (c. 1934 – October 25, 2017) was a Canadian professional football player who played for the Ottawa Rough Riders. He played college football at the University of Toronto.
