= William Stephenson (disambiguation) =

William Stephenson (1897–1989) was a Canadian-born British spy, potential inspiration for the character James Bond.

William Stephenson may also refer to:

- William Stephani (died 1428/9), or Stephenson, medieval bishop in Scotland
- William Stephenson (senior) (1763–1836), English watchmaker, schoolteacher and songwriter
- William Stephenson (junior) (1797–1838), his son, English songwriter and printer
- William B. Stephenson (1802–1884), American politician and judge
- William Haswell Stephenson (1836-1918), English industrialist and philanthropist
- William Stephenson (footballer) (1888–?), English footballer
- William Stephenson (sailor) (1889–1953), English marine engine stoker
- William Stephenson (psychologist) (1902–1989), psychologist and physicist best known for developing Q methodology
- William Stephenson (architect) (1912–2007), American architect and dance instructor
- William Stephenson (biologist) (1916-1996), British/Australian marine biologist and academic
- Bill Stephenson (1937–2010), Australian rules footballer

== See also ==
- William Stevenson (disambiguation)
