= Scarborough Athletic F.C. =

Association football club in Scarborough, England

Scarborough Athletic
- Full name: Scarborough Athletic Football Club
- Nickname: The Seadogs
- Short name: Boro
- Founded: 25 June 2007; 19 years ago
- Ground: Flamingo Land Stadium
- Capacity: 3,252 (586 seated)
- Chairman: Trevor Bull
- Manager: Jonathan Greening
- League: National League North
- 2025–26: National League North, 6th of 24
- Website: scarboroughathletic.com
Home colours	Away colours

Scarborough Athletic Football Club is an association football club based in Scarborough, North Yorkshire, England. The club currently play in the National League North, the sixth level of the English football league system.

The club was formed on 25 June 2007 as a phoenix club following the winding up of Scarborough Football Club. After spending their first ten seasons groundsharing at Queensgate, Bridlington Town, the club moved into a new stadium, Flamingo Land Stadium in Scarborough in July 2017. In 2025, it was confirmed that the club would again be groundsharing with Bridlington Town after the 3G pitch at the Flamingo Land Stadium had serious structural issues and that the work needed was not going to be complete in time to start the new 2025–26 season. The agreement saw Scarborough Athletic play the full 2025–26 season away from Scarborough. In the summer of 2026, Scarborough Athletic moved back to Scarborough. On 16 October Trevor Bull announced that the stadium will be renamed to Moneyweb Stadium.

== Background ==
A covenant existed on the McCain Stadium that restricted its use only to sporting activities. Scarborough failed to convince the Scarborough Borough Council that its proposals to sell the McCain Stadium to a housing developer would raise enough money to pay off the debts and build a new ground. Scarborough were wound up in the High Court with debts of £2.5 million on 20 June 2007, ending its 128-year existence as a club. The Seadog Trust (a supporters' trust established in 2006) then formed Scarborough Athletic to carry forward the spirit of the former club.

== History ==
Chart of yearly table positions of Scarborough in the league.

=== Formation ===
Following the liquidation of Scarborough, Scarborough Athletic was founded as a continuation or rebirth of the previous club by a supporters' trust named The Seadog Trust. They took on the same red kit, nickname, motto and official club logo from the original club. The Trust successfully applied for membership of the North Riding County Football Association and the Northern Counties East League on 25 June 2007. Due to the unavailability of any suitable grounds in the town, a ground-sharing agreement was made with Bridlington Town. On 29 June the club appointed former North Ferriby United manager Brian France as their first manager, who brought with him many former Ferriby players.

==== The NCEL Division One years ====
For their debut season, the club entered the Northern Counties East League Division One (NCEL1). The club's first-ever game was a friendly against Edgehill FC on 15 July 2007. The game ended in a goalless draw and was played in Hunmanby, North Yorkshire. Three days later, 20-year-old Shaun Chadburn gained the distinction of scoring the first-ever goal for the new club in a 2–2 draw at Northallerton Town. Their first competitive game, a NCEL1 fixture, was away to Teversal on 11 August 2007. The game ended in a 2–1 defeat in front of 427 fans and saw David Thompson score Scarborough Athletic's first-ever league goal.

The new club had mixed results early in the season, but on 24 October it was announced the club was to face a 6-point deduction and a £300 fine for fielding ineligible players earlier in the season. This decision was later upheld by the FA and so despite a run of six wins in eight matches, the club found themselves lying in 10th place in early January 2008. A strong end to the season saw the club finish with an unbeaten 12 match league run, securing a 5th-place finish.

After a slow start to the following season, gaining just one point from the opening two league games, Scarborough Athletic then embarked upon a club record 27 match unbeaten league run which saw them surge to the top of the table. On 8 November 2008, Ryan Blott scored a club record five goals in a league match at Yorkshire Amateur. By the end of February 2009 the club had moved into a commanding lead at the top of the NCEL1 table and on 21 March 2009, following a 2–1 victory at Teversal, they were guaranteed promotion to the Northern Counties East League Premier Division (NCELP). Three days later the club were confirmed as champions after a 3–0 win at home to Brighouse Town.

The NCEL1 trophy was presented to the team after the final home game of the season, against Leeds Carnegie, on 18 April 2008. A game that ensured they remained unbeaten at home in the league throughout the entire season. The club also reached the 2008–09 Northern Counties East League Presidents Cup final but lost 3–2 on aggregate to Nostell Miners Welfare after drawing the away leg 1–1 and losing the home leg 2–1. The 2008–09 season also saw Scarborough Athletic enter the FA Vase for the first time. They reached the 4th round, the furthest they would ever reach in the competition, before losing at Bideford.

==== The NCEL Premier Division years ====
The club once again had a slow start to the season, but a long winning streak followed, which took them to the top of the table by the end of September. A series of inconsistent results then followed, mainly away from home, and the club eventually finished the season in fifth place. In November a 'landlords vs tenants' match at Queensgate between Bridlington Town and Scarborough Athletic attracted a division record of 1,082 fans and in April, Athletic hit 13 goals without reply against relegated Brodsworth Welfare – a record for the club and division. This season also saw Scarborough Athletic enter the FA Cup for the first time, although they fell at the first hurdle, losing 2–1 at home to Guisborough Town in the extra-preliminary round.

In preparation for the 2010–11 season, Scarborough Athletic played their first ever game in Scarborough, a friendly against local league side Eastfield St. James. On 24 July Athletic beat Merthyr Town 2–0 to win the inaugural Supporters Direct Shield at the New Bucks Head home of AFC Telford United. The club recorded their first ever victory in the FA Cup after beating Ryton 1–0 in the extra-preliminary round on 14 August 2010. On 21 September, first team coach Paul Olsson was appointed acting manager to cover for Brian France who underwent a lengthy period of hospitalisation following a brain injury. On 19 November Olsson's managerial position was made permanent after it was revealed France would be unlikely to return before the end of his contract. League results were very inconsistent during the season, and on 31 March 2011 it was announced that Olsson had left the club by mutual consent and was replaced by former Teversal, Rainworth Miners Welfare and Shirebrook Town manager, Rudy Funk. The club finished the season in 10th place.

On the first day of the 2011–12 season Scarborough Athletic beat Parkgate at home 4–2 to register the club's first-ever opening day victory, followed by a 1–0 victory at Tadcaster Albion. The club's September was largely successful, with the exception of a disappointing 3–0 FA Cup exit to Tadcaster Albion. October was also successful in the league, but the club exited the FA Vase. A tough November saw Athletic pick up their first league draws of the season and their third defeat, but by the end of November, they were top of the table – a position which could be attributed to 12 wins from their opening 17 league fixtures. December, however, was hugely disappointing with just 1 point from 4 games. Results improved in the new year but by the end of March, Athletic found themselves too far behind the two clubs at the top of the table and, thus, out of promotion contention. On 14 April 2012 Ryan Blott hit 5 goals in a game for the 2nd time, this time against Armthorpe Welfare. A strong finish saw the club finally end the season in, a club best, 3rd position.

The 2012–13 season was very successful for Scarborough Athletic which culminated with the club being crowned Champions of The Northern Counties East League Premier Division. Athletic made a good start to the season losing only one of their opening 14 league games. By the end of September, they were sitting in second place, a point behind the leaders in a tightly contested table. Athletic's fine form in the league continued to the end of the year and with the help of a 2–1 Boxing Day victory over their landlords Bridlington Town, they entered 2013 as league leaders. The consistently good run of results continued into the latter half of the season and Athletic eventually went on to record a 26-game unbeaten league run that consisted of 20 wins and six draws and on 30 March a Bridlington Town vs Scarborough Athletic meeting attracted a crowd of 1,569, a new club and divisional record, eclipsing the previous best set by the same fixture three seasons previously. Despite the great form, Athletic were still not sure of promotion until the penultimate week of the season due to the good form of second place Brighouse Town. On 13 April 2013 Athletic visited Brighouse Town for a first vs second place clash which they won 2–0, a result that put them 9 points clear at the top of the table with just two games remaining (Brighouse had four games left to play). The following week Athletic beat Retford United 2–0 at home whilst Brighouse Town could only draw their game and, amidst great scenes of celebration, the league title was Scarborough Athletic's.

==== The NPL Division One years ====
Following promotion from the NCELP Scarborough Athletic competed as members of the Northern Premier League with the club entered to play in the Northern Premier League Division One South for the 2013–14 season. The club also entered the FA Trophy for the first time winning through three ties to eventually go out at the 3rd round qualifying stage. Boro made a slow start to life in the NPL, with just one win from their first seven matches; however, they did reach the 2nd qualifying round of the FA Cup for the first time. However, from late September onwards results showed a dramatic improvement, and twelve wins from the next fifteen league fixtures lifted Boro into play-off contention by the start of the new year. Results were inconsistent from January onwards and by the end of March Boro were realistically out of the play-off chase & the season ended with the club in 7th place.

Prior to the start of the 2014–15 season, Scarborough Athletic were moved laterally from the Northern Premier League Division One South to compete in the Northern Premier League Division One North. The team got off to a good start and at the half-way stage of the season, Boro had won thirteen, drawn one and lost eight games which placed them just outside the play off zone. Once again they reached the 2nd qualifying round of the FA Cup after replay victories over North Shields (on penalties) and Ashington before bowing out of the competition having lost 1–0 at Curzon Ashton. Early in November Rudy Funk unexpectedly resigned his position as manager to be succeeded by his erstwhile assistants Paul Foot and Bryan Hughes who both took on the role as joint-managers. The team continued their good form into the second half of the season but, with the season coming to an end results dropped off and they eventually ended the campaign in 6th place just two points shy of the play-offs. It was however their highest placed finish since formation. On 6 April a league game against promotion-chasing Darlington attracted a crowd of 1,118, which at the time was a new record home attendance.

The 2015–16 season began in a positive fashion with the team winning their opening four games without conceding a goal. An unexpected drop in form followed and on 23 December both joint-managers left the club by mutual consent. Club captain Matty Bloor took on managerial responsibility for two games until Steve Kittrick was appointed permanent manager on 5 January 2016. Boro finished the season in a very disappointing 20th place (although 12 points clear of the team below them). The poor season and continued groundsharing at Bridlington also contributed to the club's record low league attendance of 211. The club were eliminated from the FA Cup and Trophy at the preliminary round stage of both, but the poor league season was partly compensated for by the club reaching the final of the Northern Premier League Challenge Cup.

The 2016–17 season had a slow start, and an inconsistent set of results in their first ten games left them in mid-table by the end of September. A strong run of form took the club to the top of the table in late November, but then form dried up, and in February the team was languishing well outside the play-off zone. However, the club finished the season with an eight-match winning run (with no goals conceded) which saw them finish 3rd in the table, their highest ever finish, and for the first time qualification for the play-offs, where they lost 3–1 to Ossett Town in the semi-final. This play-off semi-final defeat, watched by 1,004 supporters, would be the club's last home game played at Bridlington Town. For the second season in a row, the team exited the FA Cup and FA Trophy in the preliminary round.

=== Homecoming season ===
The 2017–18 season saw Boro returning to their hometown of Scarborough after ten years in exile. The opening pre-season friendly at the new stadium resulted in a 4–1 defeat against a young Sheffield United team, in front of an almost sell-out crowd of 2,038 supporters. The club played their first competitive match in the town on 12 August 2017, with a club-record 1,385 spectators witnessing a 0–0 draw against Hyde United. Scarborough also managed to reach the FA Cup fourth qualifying round, before losing to Hyde United in front of a club record attendance of 2,003. Boro's league form continued to be solid, and on Boxing Day, a nine-game winning streak began which placed Boro in second position by 20 February, with 20 victories from 27 league games. After a brief downturn in form, Boro recorded a run of nine wins and a draw in their final ten league games, ending the season as runners-up and promoted to the Northern Premier League Premier Division. A memorable season finished with an appearance at Middlesbrough FC's Riverside Stadium in the North Riding Senior Cup final.

==== The NPL Premier Division years ====
Scarborough Athletic got the 2018–19 season off to a good start with six wins, three draws and two losses in their opening eleven league games, and they topped the table for several weeks in the Autumn. However, a poor run of form either side of Christmas, where the club gained 17 points from a possible 45, saw Boro sitting in 6th position at the end of February, just outside the playoff places.

On 16 March after a disappointing home defeat to Stalybridge Celtic. which saw the club lose further ground in the play-off chase, manager Steve Kittrick was relieved of his duties with Steve Roberts taking over as manager on a caretaker basis. On 2 April former Bradford Park Avenue and Farsley Celtic chief John Deacey was appointed as the new manager, but eight league defeats since New Year's Day saw Boro's playoff hopes finally extinguished with one game to go. The club ended their first season at the new level with an 8th-place finish. Boro reached the North Riding Senior Cup final for the second successive year and beat Marske United on penalties at Middlesbrough's Riverside Stadium to win the club's first cup since forming in 2007.

During the summer of 2019, a new covered stand was erected at the Flamingo Land Stadium which increased the capacity from 2,070 to 2,833. It was officially opened prior to the opening home game of the 2019–20 season.

==== The Coronavirus (COVID-19) seasons ====
The 2019–20 season got off to a poor start for Boro, with two wins, six draws, and four defeats seeing the Seadogs languishing in 15th position after twelve matches with twelve points. Unusually, they drew their first seven competitive home matches of the season, before finally recording a home win on 15 October. An FA Cup 1st qualifying round replay win against Marske United (mirroring the 2017–18 season) set up an attractive 2nd qualifying round tie away at National League North club Southport. However, Boro's cup run ended there abruptly, with Southport running out 5–2 winners. The disappointing run of results continued and manager John Deacey eventually left the club by mutual consent on 24 November and was replaced by Darren Kelly, who made an immediate impact, winning his first three league games in charge. On 25 March 2020, due to the worldwide Coronavirus pandemic, and following a suspension of football, the Northern Premier League season was declared null and void, and all records were expunged.

The 2020–21 season began later than usual on 19 September. Due to the Borough of Scarborough declaring a higher than average rate of positive COVID-19 cases in September and October, Boro moved their first home league games of the season to the respective away grounds to avoid the financially consequences of playing behind closed doors. On 17 October, Boro welcomed fans to a home game for the first time since the March national lockdown, with a sold out capped attendance of 600 witnessing a 1–1 draw with Nantwich Town. In February 2021, it was confirmed that for the second consecutive season the league would not be completed due to the ongoing pandemic, with Boro having played just eight league games. Darren Kelly resigned as Scarborough manager on 18 May 2021 and was subsequently replaced by Jonathan Greening.

==== Promotion to the National League North ====
The 2021–22 season began against the backdrop of the ongoing pandemic, but with a highly vaccinated population alongside some remaining protective measures, fans were let back into stadiums without restrictions. A strong second half of the season saw Boro propel themselves into a play-off position, which was helped by a run of just one defeat in the last nineteen games of the season. Boro finished the season third; their highest position in the pyramid since reforming in 2007. This guaranteed them a home play-off semi-final against Matlock Town, which they won 2–1 in front of a new club record attendance of 2,676 to progress to the final against Warrington Town. Scarborough then beat Warrington Town 2–1 in the play-off final to secure a place in the 2022–23 National North, in front of a new record crowd of 2,805 meaning the club broke its record attendance twice in 6 days. The club subsequently won the final of the North Riding Senior Cup, two days later.

After an impressive start to the 2022–23 season, the club set its new attendance record for the third time in ten months, with 3,205 attending the local derby with Darlington on 2 January 2023. However, an inconsistent end to the season saw Scarborough miss out on the play-off places on the final day of the season on goal difference but managed to retain the North Riding Senior Cup.

In the 2023–24 FA Cup, Scarborough reached the first round of the tournament for the first time thanks to a win against Oxford City. Scarborough were eliminated in the first round by League Two club Forest Green Rovers, losing 5–2 in a replay after a 1–1 draw in the first game. The FA ordered the match to be replayed again after Forest Green had fielded an ineligible player, however, Scarborough lost this match 4–2 at home.

== Players ==
=== Current squad ===
As of 17 August 2026

Note: Flags indicate national team as defined under FIFA eligibility rules; some limited exceptions apply. Players may hold more than one non-FIFA nationality.

No.	Pos.	Nation	Player
1	GK	ENG	Ryan Whitley
2	DF	SCO	Kieran Weledji
3	DF	ENG	Michael Duckworth
4	MF	ENG	Lewis Maloney
5	DF	ENG	Will Thornton (captain)
7	FW	ENG	Rio Allen
8	MF	ENG	Alex Purver
9	MF	ENG	Luke Hall
10	FW	ENG	Harry Green

No.	Pos.	Nation	Player
11	MF	ENG	Luca Colville
12	MF	VGB	Luca Stuttard
14	MF	ENG	Alex Wiles
17	MF	ENG	Dom Tear
18	FW	GAM	Mo Fadera
21	DF	ENG	Alex Brown
22	DF	ENG	Jack Waldron
28	DF	ENG	Jake Hull

== Honours ==
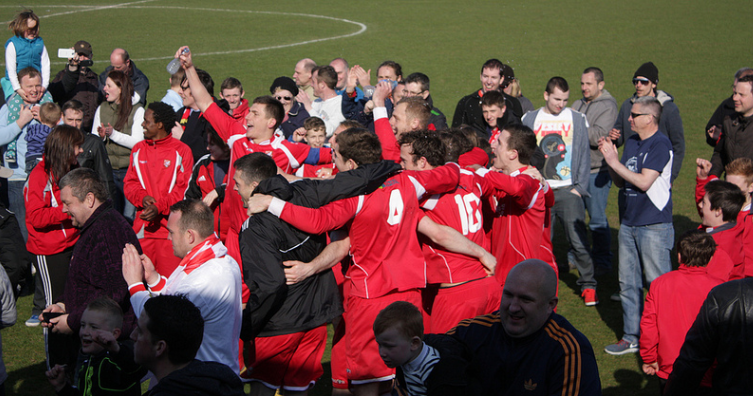
Scarborough Athletic players celebrate winning the Northern Counties East League 2012–13 Premier Division Title

League

- Northern Premier League Premier Division
  - Play-off winners: 2022
- Northern Premier League Division One North
  - Runners-up: 2017–18
- Northern Counties East League Premier Division
  - Champions: 2012–13
- Northern Counties East League Division One
  - Champions: 2008–09

Cup

- North Riding Senior Cup
  - Winners: 2018–19, 2021–22, 2022–23, 2024–25
  - Runners-up: 2017–18
- Northern Premier League Challenge Cup
  - Runners-up: 2015–16
- Northern Counties East League Presidents Cup
  - Runners-up: 2008–09
- Supporters Direct Shield
  - Winners: 2010–11

== Managers ==
As of 24 October 2026. Only competitive matches are counted. Please note that the league games in the 2019–20 season do not count, as the season was abandoned on 8 March and records expunged. The 2020–21 league season contained just eight matches for Scarborough Athletic, which have been added to Darren Kelly's record.

Name	Period	G	W	D	L	Win %	Ref
Brian France	29 June 2007 – 21 September 2010	143	86	21	36	60.13	
Paul Olsson	21 September 2010 – 31 March 2011	36	18	5	13	50.00	
Rudy Funk	31 March 2011 – 3 November 2014	179	94	35	50	52.51	
Paul Foot and Bryan Hughes	4 November 2014 – 23 December 2015	56	24	11	21	42.86	
Matty Bloor (caretaker)	23 December 2015 – 5 January 2016	2	0	0	2	00.00	
Steve Kittrick	5 January 2016 – 16 March 2019	177	90	29	58	50.85	
Steve Roberts (caretaker)	16 March 2019 – 2 April 2019	2	0	1	1	00.00	
John Deacey	2 April 2019 – 24 November 2019	10	4	2	4	40.00	
Darren Kelly	25 November 2019 – 17 May 2021	12	5	2	5	41.70	
Jonathan Greening	21 May 2021 – Present	283	119	76	88	42.05	

== Records ==
=== Club records ===
- Best FA Cup performance: First round, 2023–24, vs. Forest Green Rovers and 2024–25, vs. Burton Albion
- Highest league position: 6th in National League North (Tier 6/NLS Step 2), 2025–26
- Record victory: 13–0 vs. Brodsworth Welfare, 24 April 2010
- Record home victory: 13–0 vs. Brodsworth Welfare, 24 April 2010
- Record away victory: 10–0 vs. Lincoln Moorlands Railway, 15 September 2012
- Record defeat: 0–6 at Thackley, 16 April 2013; AFC Telford United, 16 November 2013, and FC United of Manchester, 28 September 2021.
- Record home defeat: 2–6 vs. Barton Town Old Boys, 25 August 2007; 1–5 vs. Guisborough Town, 22 November 2011; 0–4 vs. Darlington, 1 November 2014, and 1–5 vs. Dunston UTS, 19 November 2019
- Record away defeat: 0–6 at Thackley, 16 April 2013; AFC Telford United, 16 November 2013, and FC United of Manchester, 28 September 2021.
- Record attendance: 3,209 vs. Forest Green Rovers, FA Cup 1st Round, 4 November 2023
- Longest unbeaten run: (League) 27 games, 23 August 2008 to 14 March 2009
- Longest unbeaten home run: (League) 35 games, 9 February 2008 to 9 February 2010
- Longest unbeaten away run: (League) 13 games, 25 August 2008 to 11 March 2009 and 10 October 2012 to 13 April 2013
- Most games won in a row: (League) 15 games, 25 October 2008 to 7 March 2009
- Most games lost in a row: (League) 9 games, 14 November 2015 to 23 January 2016
- Longest time without conceding: 763 minutes, 4 March 2017 to 25 April 2017

=== Player records ===
- Record goalscorer: Ryan Blott, 231
- Most goals in a season (all competitions): 42, Ryan Blott, 2008–09 and Michael Coulson, 2017–18
- Most league goals in a season: 37, Ryan Blott, 2012–13.
- Most goals scored in a match by one player: 5, Ryan Blott vs. Yorkshire Amateur, 8 November 2008 & v Armthorpe Welfare, 14 April 2012
- Most appearances: Ryan Blott, 380 (341 starts and 39 as substitute), 20 October 2007 to 29 September 2020

=== International caps ===
- Most international caps whilst a Scarborough Athletic FC player: Jacob Hazel, 2 for Saint Kitts and Nevis

Player	Country	Caps while at club	Total caps
Jacob Hazel	Saint Kitts and Nevis	2	3
Kole Hall	Bermuda	1	1

== Media ==
Commentary on Scarborough Athletic games is broadcast on This is the Coast. Commentary was previously broadcast on the online platform of another local radio station, Yorkshire Coast Radio until this was absorbed into Greatest Hits Radio in September 2020.

Scarborough Athletic’s media team is supported by a group of volunteer photographers. For the 2024–25 season these include Chris Walker, John Westgarth, Zach Foster and Rhys O’Callaghan amongst others.

== Reserve team ==
A reserve team existed from June 2008 until October 2014 when lack of player availability lead to the reserves withdrawing from all competition early in the 2014–15 season. The reserves played in the Humber Premier League and were promoted from the First Division to the Premier Division (as runners up) in the 2012–13 season. Home games were played at Rotsea Lane, Hutton Cranswick, East Riding of Yorkshire, the home of Hutton Cranswick United FC from formation until the end of the 2009–10 season and then from the 2010–11 season onwards at the Community Sports Club complex in Filey, North Yorkshire. It was announced on social media on 3 July 2022, that the Reserves side would be reforming to assist manager Jono Greening in managing his squad for Scarborough's first season in the National League. The newly formed reserve team will be playing in division one of the Humber Premier League for the 2022–23 season and will be playing from Filey Community Sports Club.

== U19s team and Youth Development teams ==
Scarborough Athletic U19s side was formed during the 2010–11 season. The club affiliated the team to the North Riding FA in August 2010, but were unable to enter the side into a league in time to play competitive football for that season although some friendly fixtures were played.

From the 2011–12 season the U19s entered the Northern U19s Alliance League with home fixtures played at the Mill Lane home of Pickering Town. The current U19s manager is Ian Wilson. The 2011–12 season also saw the formation of the U16s and U12s teams, both of whom entered the Hull Boys Sunday League. The Under 16s achieved success in their debut season, winning their league and reaching two cup finals, one of which they won.

For the 2012–13 season, three further youth teams were formed at U18, U14 and U13 level, resulting in six age-group teams in total.

== Supporter activities ==
On 4 November 2009 the club launched the Back2Boro scheme which has two main objectives: to raise awareness of the club's lack of a permanent home, and to raise funds to help finance a return home to Scarborough. The club had its own online radio service called "Seadogslive", which provided live match commentaries on selected home fixtures and occasional away games. This service was discontinued in 2010. Scarborough Athletic had an occasionally published fanzine entitled Abandon Chip!, which had been continued from the original club. In 2019 a new fanzine was produced called Voice of Treason; another semi-regular publication called Boro Memories was also launched.

In April 2016, the club launched its first-ever 'frame' football team, for youngsters with cerebral palsy. Season one concluded in October 2016.

A fan group has recently arisen called the 'Warwickshire Weledjis', a Warwick based fan group of the club and its loyal player Keiran Weledji.

== See also ==
- List of fan-owned sports teams
