= Bob Kimoff =

Profile
- Positions: Halfback, Fullback

Personal information
- Born: c. 1932; Toronto, Ontario
- Died: September 9, 2003 (aged 70–71); Calgary, Alberta
- Listed height: 6 ft 0 in (1.83 m)
- Listed weight: 190 lb (86 kg)

Career information
- University: Toronto

Career history
- 1955–1958: Edmonton Eskimos

Awards and highlights
- Grey Cup champion (1955, 1956)

Robert Kimoff (c. 1932 – September 9, 2003) was a Canadian professional football player who played for the Edmonton Eskimos. He won the Grey Cup with the Eskimos in 1955 and 1956. He was an alumnus of the University of Toronto. In 2003, he died of cancer at Foothills Hospital in Calgary.
