= Blackwell Meadows =

Sports venue in Darlington, England

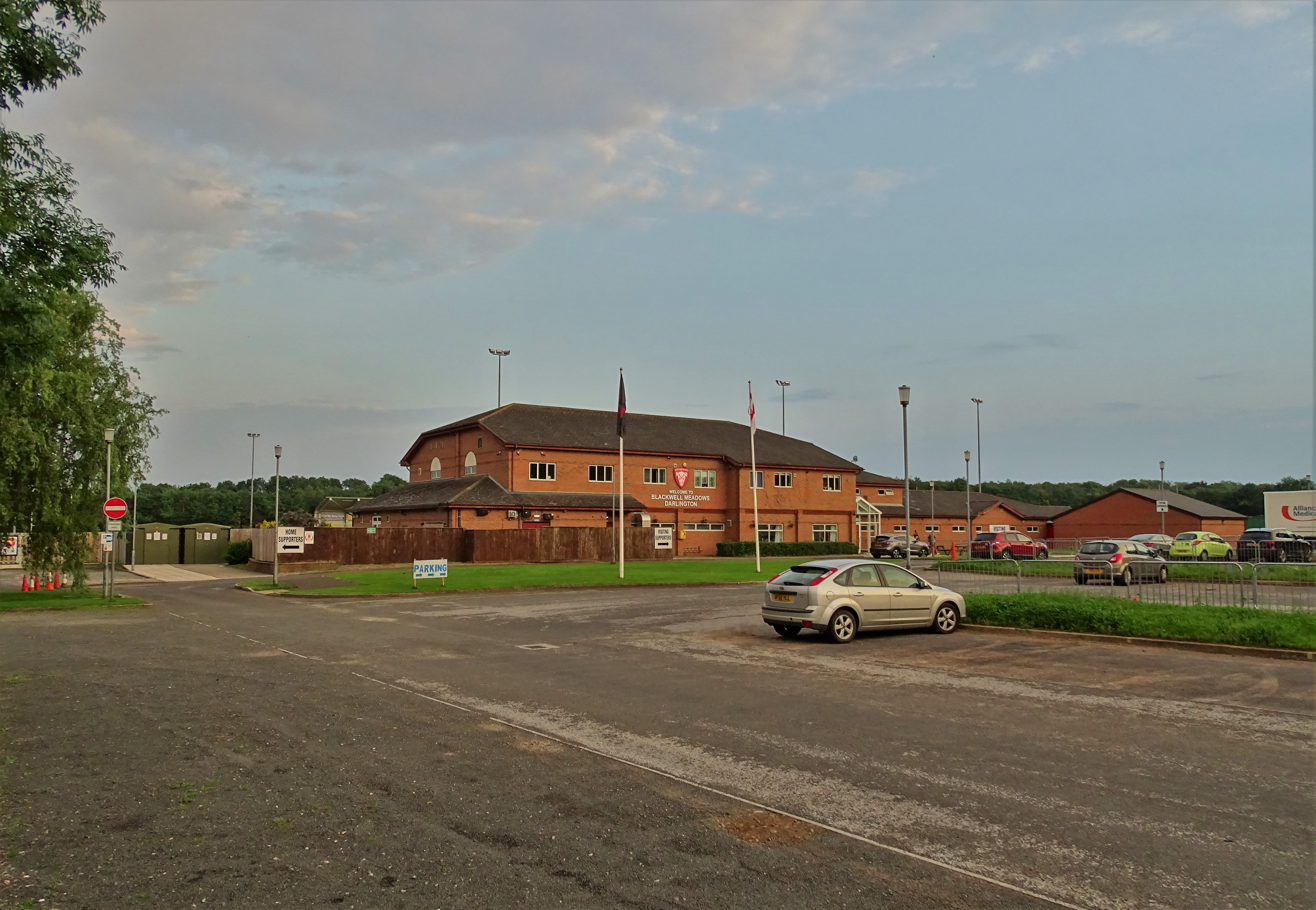
- Interactive map of Blackwell Meadows
- Full name: Blackwell Meadows
- Location: Grange Road; Darlington; DL1 5NR
- Coordinates: 54.5096°N 1.5638°W
- Capacity: 3,281 (588 seated)
- Events: Multi-purpose sports ground: Rugby union Association football
- Surface: Grass
- Record attendance: 3,106 (Darlington v Walsall, 20 November 2019)
- Field size: 120 x 80 yards (109 x 73 m)

Construction
- Opened: 1994; 32 years ago (as rugby ground); 2016; 10 years ago (as football ground)
- Cost: £1.7 million (1994 opening)

Tenants
- Rugby union: Darlington RFC (1994–present); Association football: Darlington 1883 (2016–2017); Darlington F.C. (2017–present)

Blackwell Meadows is a multi-purpose sports ground in Darlington, County Durham, England. It provides facilities for both rugby union and association football, which provides the homes of Darlington RFC and Darlington F.C., with a capacity of 3,281 including 588 seated.

Opened in 1994, it was initially constructed to host games for Darlington RFC, a grassroots rugby union team who were looking for a new premises after selling their McMullen Road location for retail development. The club committed £1.7 million to develop their new ground. The ground also hosted an international game in 2013.

In 2016, the ground was renovated in order to begin hosting matches for Darlington 1883, the new guise of the collapsed Darlington F.C.. This marked the club's return to their hometown for the first time since their departure from the nearby Darlington Arena in 2012. The club would go on to return to their traditional Darlington FC name the following year, and gradually began to develop the facilities overtime.

== History ==
Blackwell Meadows hosted their first international match on 3 March 2013, when the England under-18 rugby union team faced Scotland; England came out as 57–13 winners in front of 1,600 spectators.

In December 2013, it was announced that Darlington 1883, a football club who at that point were a continuation of Darlington F.C., would move to Blackwell Meadows, returning to the town of Darlington for the first time since they left The Darlington Arena in 2012, after a prolonged period of financial difficulty. Prior to their relocation to Blackwell Meadows, the club have agreed to ground-share with Bishop Auckland F.C. at their Heritage Park ground, where they played at for four years.

The club announced their intentions to finally make the move at the start of the 2016–17 season, with expansion plans in place to increase the capacity of Blackwell Meadows to 3,000 in order to meet requirements to play in the National League. They played their first game at the ground on 26 December 2016 against FC Halifax Town, which would be their record attendance as 3,000 spectators witnessed the club's return to their hometown.

Despite finishing in the play-off places during their first season at Blackwell Meadows, Darlington were disqualified from competing in the play-offs for a chance for promotion to the National League due to an inadequate quantity of seats. As a result, the club expanded their seated stand to 588 in 2018 to avoid the same events occurring again.

Having reverted to their traditional playing name of Darlington F.C. ahead of the 2017–18 season, the club announced during the summer of 2017 that work had begun on a new playing area and a new seated stadium following the addition of further fundraising. The club continues to explore further ways to improve Blackwell Meadows, including a stand at the currently empty west end of the ground.

== Attendances ==
Club	Season	League	League finish position	Average attendance	Capacity	% full
Darlington 1883	2016–17	National League North	5th	1,739	3,000	58.0
Darlington F.C.	2017–18	National League North	12th	1,456	3,000	48.5
Darlington F.C.	2018–19	National League North	16th	1,394	3,281	42.5
Darlington F.C.	2019–20	National League North	11th	1,471	3,281	44.8
Darlington F.C.	2020–21	National League North	19th	0	3,281	0
Darlington F.C.	2021–22	National League North	13th	1,492	3,281	45.5
Darlington F.C.	2022–23	National League North	10th	1,548	3,281	47.2
Darlington F.C.	2023–24	National League North	16th	1,475	3,281	44.9
Darlington F.C.	2024–25	National League North	11th	1,436	3,281	43.8
Darlington F.C.	2025–26	National League North	9th	1,413	3,281	43.1
Darlington F.C.	2026–27	National League North	19th	1,683	3,281	51.3

== International matches ==
Date	Sport	Result			Competition	Attendance
3 March 2013	Rugby union	England	57–13	Scotland	Under-18 rugby union international	1,600
