= Alex Macklin =

Canadian football player (born 1932)

Profile
- Positions: Guard, Tackle

Personal information
- Born: 1932; Winnipeg, Manitoba, Canada
- Listed height: 6 ft 3 in (1.91 m)
- Listed weight: 235 lb (107 kg)

Career information
- University: Toronto

Career history
- 1955–1956: Calgary Stampeders

Alex Macklin (born 1932) is a Canadian former professional football player who played for the Calgary Stampeders. He previously played at the University of Toronto. During his professional Canadian football career, Alex Macklin played the Guard/Tackle position. The Guard/Tackle position is on the offensive line. Alex's job was to protect the quarterback and block for the running backs. During his career Alex only played two years in the CFL from 1955–1956. This resulted him to only playing in 23 career games.
