= Pelechy =

- Municipality
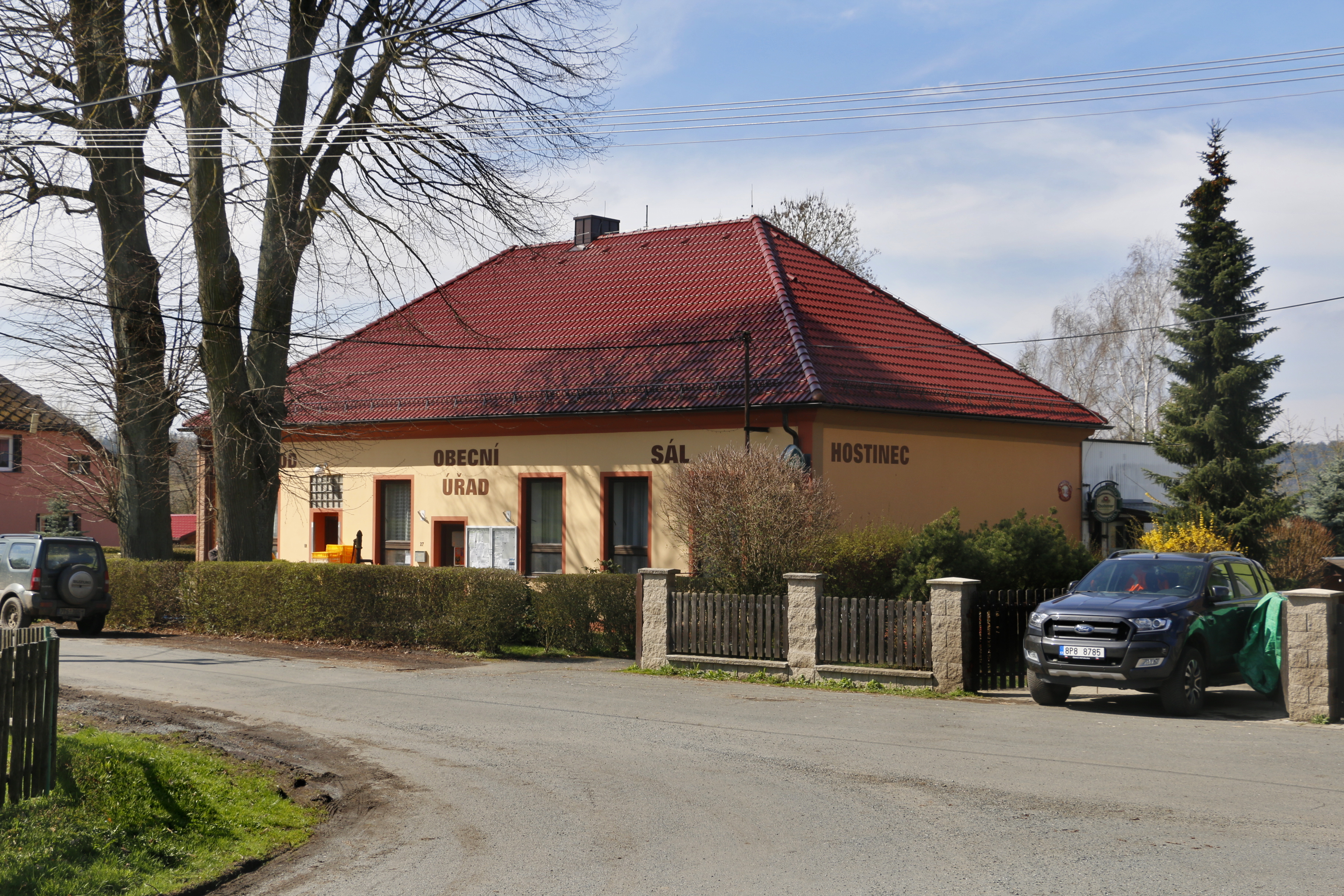
- Municipal office

- Location in the Czech Republic
- Coordinates: 49°23′21″N 12°54′50″E
- Country: Czech Republic
- Region: Plzeň
- District: Domažlice
- First mentioned: 1789

Area
  - Total: 1.68 km^{2} (0.65 sq mi)
- Elevation: 574 m (1,883 ft)

Population (2026-01-01)
  - Total: 89
  - Density: 53/km^{2} (140/sq mi)
- Time zone: UTC+1 (CET)
  - Summer (DST): UTC+2 (CEST)
- Postal code: 344 01
- Website: www.pelechy.cz

Pelechy is a municipality and village in Domažlice District in the Plzeň Region of the Czech Republic. It has about 90 inhabitants.

Pelechy lies approximately 7 kilometres (4 mi) south of Domažlice, 53 km (33 mi) south-west of Plzeň, and 134 km (83 mi) south-west of Prague.

== History ==
The first written mention of Pelechy is from 1789. The village was founded between 1768 and 1789.

== Demographics ==
Historical population
Year	Pop.	±%
1869	324	—
1880	312	−3.7%
1890	378	+21.2%
1900	327	−13.5%
1910	327	+0.0%
1921	311	−4.9%
1930	281	−9.6%
1950	115	−59.1%
1961	120	+4.3%
1970	96	−20.0%
1980	90	−6.2%
1991	71	−21.1%
2001	72	+1.4%
2011	67	−6.9%
2021	79	+17.9%
Source: Censuses
