= William Stevenson (physician) =

Irish physician

- Born: 1719?
- Died: 13 April 1783; Newark
- Occupation: Physician

William Stevenson (1719? – 13 April 1783) was an Irish physician.

== Biography ==
Stevenson was Irish by birth. He was born about 1719, was first cousin to Andrew Thomas Stewart, sixth baron Stewart of Stewart Castle, co. Tyrone. The Stewarts removed to Scotland in consequence of the troublous times in Ireland at the beginning of the eighteenth century, and it was probably for this reason that Stevenson received his medical education at the university of Edinburgh. Here he studied under Alexander Monro I and Alexander Monro II, John Rutherford, Robert Whytt, and William Cullen. He graduated M.D. with the inaugural thesis ‘De Diabete,’ and remained in the city two years longer, partly to study medicine further and partly for instruction in divinity. He was one of the earliest members of the Edinburgh Medical Society, founded in 1737, and he appears to have served for a time in the army, for he says that he ‘was formerly commander of one of his majesty's forts.’ He practised for some time at Coleraine in Ireland, and then moved to Wells in Somerset, where he was practising as a physician in 1779. He lived for a short time at Bath, but moved to Newark at the end of May 1781. Here he died suddenly on 13 April 1783.

A presbyterian in religion and a Jacobite in politics, Stevenson in his later years was constantly at variance with his surroundings. He hated the apothecaries, he despised the Royal College of Physicians, and he abhorred the therapeutic measures adopted by his contemporaries. His pen was venomous, and he spent his life lampooning and being lampooned. He appears to have been a shrewd physician, magnifying his calling, disbelieving in the efficacy of drugs or of bleeding, but with an abiding faith in the curative value of blisters and issues. His contemporaries regarded him as a malignant quack, who endeavoured to destroy their lucrative practice by explaining away the remedial action of the Bath waters in gout.

His works were:

- ‘A Successful Method of treating the Gout by Blistering, with an Introduction consisting of Miscellaneous Matter,’ Bath, 1779, 8vo.
- ‘Cases of Medicine interspersed with Strictures occasioned by some late Medical Transactions in the town of Newark,’ London, 1782, 8vo.
- ‘Dr. Stevenson's Reply to a Letter addressed to Dr. Stevenson of Newark by Ed. Harrison,’ Newark, 1782, 8vo.
- ‘Candid Animadversions on … a Singular Gouty Case, to which are prefixed Strictures on Royal Medical Colleges, likewise a summary Opinion of the late Disorder called the Influenza,’ Newark, 1782, 8vo.
- ‘Considerations on the Dangerous Effects of Promiscuous Blood-letting and the common Preposterous Administration of Drugs, with other Coincident Subjects, Medical and Moral,’ Newark, 1783, 8vo. This work is incomplete, and was published after Stevenson's death.
