= John Prendergast (Canadian football) =

Canadian football offensive lineman

Profile
- Positions: Center, End

Personal information
- Born: 1930/1931
- Died: September 4, 2016; Southlake Regional Health Centre, Newmarket, Ontario, Canada
- Listed height: 6 ft 1 in (1.85 m)
- Listed weight: 215 lb (98 kg)

Career history
- 1956–1957: Calgary Stampeders

John Robert Prendergast (born 1930/1931 - September 4, 2016) was a Canadian professional football player who played for the Calgary Stampeders.

He played three plus years with Calgary Stampeders followed by 40 years in the aviation industry including airborne geophysics, arctic exploration and heliskiing.
