= Jack Cook =

Canadian football player

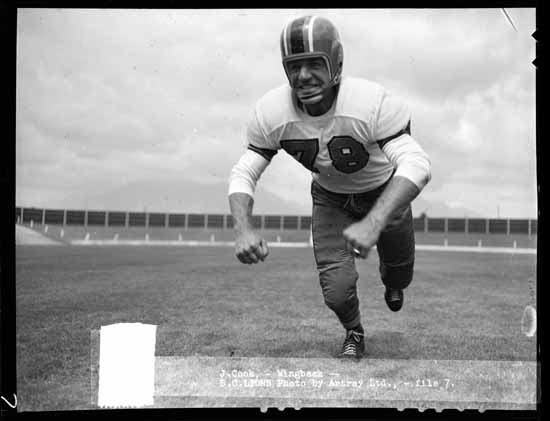
- Cook in 1955

Profile
- Positions: Wingback, Halfback

Personal information
- Born: c. 1930
- Listed height: 5 ft 10 in (1.78 m)
- Listed weight: 190 lb (86 kg)

Career information
- University: Queen's

Career history
- 1955: BC Lions

Jack Cook (born c. 1930) was a Canadian professional football player who played for the BC Lions. He played CIS football at Queen's University.
