= Bill Stevenson (quarterback) =

Canadian football player (1933–2022)

Profile
- Position: Quarterback

Personal information
- Born: March 11, 1933; Toronto, Ontario, Canada
- Died: March 3, 2022 (aged 88); Toronto, Ontario, Canada
- Listed height: 6 ft 0 in (1.83 m)
- Listed weight: 190 lb (86 kg)

Career information
- High school: North (Toronto)
- University: Toronto
- CFL draft: 1955: 3rd round, 12th overall pick

Career history
- 1955–1957: Calgary Stampeders

William Griffith Stevenson (March 11, 1933 – February 3, 2022) was a Canadian professional football player who played for the Calgary Stampeders. He played college football at the University of Toronto. He was selected by the Montreal Alouettes in the 1955 IFRU draft.
