= Bill Stevenson (businessman) =

American businessman, first husband of Jill Biden (born 1948)

- Born: 1948 (age 77–78); United States
- Education: University of Delaware
- Occupation: Businessman
- Known for: Charged with the murder of his second wife, Linda Stevenson
- Spouses: Jill Jacobs (m. 1970; div. 1975) Linda Stevenson (m. 1986; died 2025)

William W. Stevenson III (born 1948) is an American businessman. He previously owned the nationally-known Stone Balloon bar in Newark, Delaware, and was inducted into the Delaware Rock 'n Roll Hall of Fame.

He is the ex-husband of First Lady of the United States Jill Biden, to whom he was married from 1970 until finalizing their divorce in 1975. Stevenson became the subject of national attention in early 2026 after being charged with the murder of his second wife, Linda Stevenson, in Wilmington, Delaware.

== Early life, first marriage, and career ==
Stevenson reported attending the August 1969 Woodstock festival as a formative experience to his interest in the music industry. In this same period, he played football as a defensive back for Sussex Central High School, for which he was honored in December 1969. He attended the University of Delaware and played college football for the Delaware Fightin' Blue Hens football team.

In February 1970, Stevenson married Jill Jacobs, then 18 and a student at the University of Delaware, who took his surname.

In 1971, at the age of 23, Stevenson bought Merrill's Place bar with his brother George. They bought the land the establishment stood on the following year. In 1972, they turned the bar into the Stone Balloon, which became one of the leading rock clubs on the East Coast of the United States, and one of the most successful college bars in the nation. Stevenson and his then-wife worked together at the Stone Balloon during its early years. In addition to local bands, musical artists who performed at the Stone Balloon during this period included a 1974, pre-Born to Run-fame Bruce Springsteen as well as Chubby Checker and Tiny Tim. However the bulk of the Stone Balloon's prominence as a venue for up-and-coming major artists occurred after Stevenson's marriage with Jill ended. Jill and Stevenson drifted apart and separated in 1974. Their divorce was turbulent. Jill petitioned for a half-share in the Stone Balloon club, but the court case ended without its being awarded to her. A civil divorce was granted in May 1975.

In August 2020, Bill Stevenson told media outlets that the oft-told story about Joe and Jill Biden meeting on a blind date was made up. Stevenson asserted that he and Jill had known Joe Biden and his first wife Neilia going back to 1972, that he had asked County Councilman Biden for help with a liquor license and had held a fund-raiser for his 1972 Senate campaign, and that Joe and Jill had begun an affair in 1974 before he and Jill had separated. In response to Stevenson's statement, in September 2020 a spokesman for Jill Biden called the claims "fictitious, seemingly to sell and promote a book", describing the Biden's relationship as "well documented" in post-dating Jill's divorce from Stevenson.

== Business and legal issues, and second marriage ==
In a July 2021 interview, Stevenson claimed that he had an affair with Kathie Durst, the wife of (later-convicted) murderer Robert Durst, in December 1981 and January 1982. Kathie Durst had gone missing soon after this time period, with Robert Durst later suspected in her disappearance.

By 1982, the Stone Balloon was experiencing financial troubles. That year, Stevenson and his brother George were federally indicted on allegations of having failed to deposit the Social Security taxes withheld from the paychecks of the Stone Balloon's staff. At the time, Stevenson was the club's president, and his brother George was its vice president. George Stevenson pled guilty in a plea bargain to two federal tax charges, while the charges against Bill Stevenson were dropped. In December 1982, Stevenson made a deal with investors in which he bought his brother's share of the Stone Balloon to avoid having it put up in a sheriff's sale. In June 1983, Stevenson sold the Stone Balloon, and was retained for a time by the new owners as manager.

In February 1984, Stevenson was indicted for writing bad checks from an already-closed bank account, entering a Robinson plea (in which he did not admit guilt) to thirteen misdemeanors in August of that year. In October 1985, he was formally sentenced by Delaware Superior Court judge Richard S. Gebelein to four years in jail, suspended to six years probation. In 1986, he was again put on trial for allegedly claiming a car he did not own in order to secure a loan from Wilmington Trust. That June, he was found guilty, and sentenced by judge Murray Merle Schwartz of the United States District Court for the District of Delaware to two years in prison, suspended to four years' probation. Stevenson later blamed his legal issues on politics, asserting that his first federal indictment came in the midst of his dispute with Jill Biden over the settlement of property from their divorce.

Stevenson married Linda Stevenson in 1986, approximately a decade after his divorce from Jill Biden. In 1987, Stevenson was given a trial lease on the State Theater in Newark, Delaware, with plans to transform it into a rock concert venue. However, his attempts to hold concerts there were prevented when it was ordered closed due to safety code issues.

== Later life ==
In 2000, when Stevenson turned 50, he competed in shot put at the National Senior Games, setting a new record in the event for his age class. At some point, he founded a horticultural company and invented a plant support system later sold to Scotts Miracle-Gro.

In 2012, Delaware Today named him one of the "50 Most Influential Delawareans of the Past 50 Years", citing his operation of the Stone Balloon. In 2018, Stevenson was inducted into Delaware Rock 'n' Roll Hall of Fame for his role as a supporter of the Delaware rock scene as the owner of the Stone Balloon. He began to be involved in efforts to equip police patrol cars with defibrillators after suffering a heart attack while visiting New York City in August 2018.

Stevenson described himself as a liberal Republican, and claimed to have voted for Barack Obama and Joe Biden in the 2008 and 2012 elections, but in the 2020 United States presidential election, in which Joe Biden was the Democratic Party's presidential nominee, Stevenson supported Republican incumbent Donald Trump. The manuscript for Stevenson's autobiography, which he intended to publish prior to the November general elections, was reported to devote eighty pages to accusations against the Bidens, including a claim that Joe Biden had engaged in an extramarital affair with Jill prior to her divorce decree against Stevenson being issued.

== 2026 murder charge ==
In 2026, Stevenson was charged with the murder of his second wife, 64 year-old Linda Stevenson. On December 28, 2025, New Castle County, Delaware, police responded to a reported domestic dispute at the Stevensons' home on Idlewood Road in the Oak Hill neighborhood, near Elsmere, Delaware. Officers found Linda unresponsive on the living room floor and performed lifesaving measures, but she was pronounced dead shortly afterward.

On February 2, 2026, a New Castle County grand jury indicted Stevenson, then 77, on a charge of first-degree murder, alleging that he "did intentionally cause the death" of his wife. He was taken into custody at his home without incident. Stevenson was arraigned and held at the Howard R. Young Correctional Institution in Wilmington after failing to post $500,000 bail. Jill Biden reportedly declined to comment on the arrest.
