= Scarborough Sports Village =

Football ground in Scarborough, England

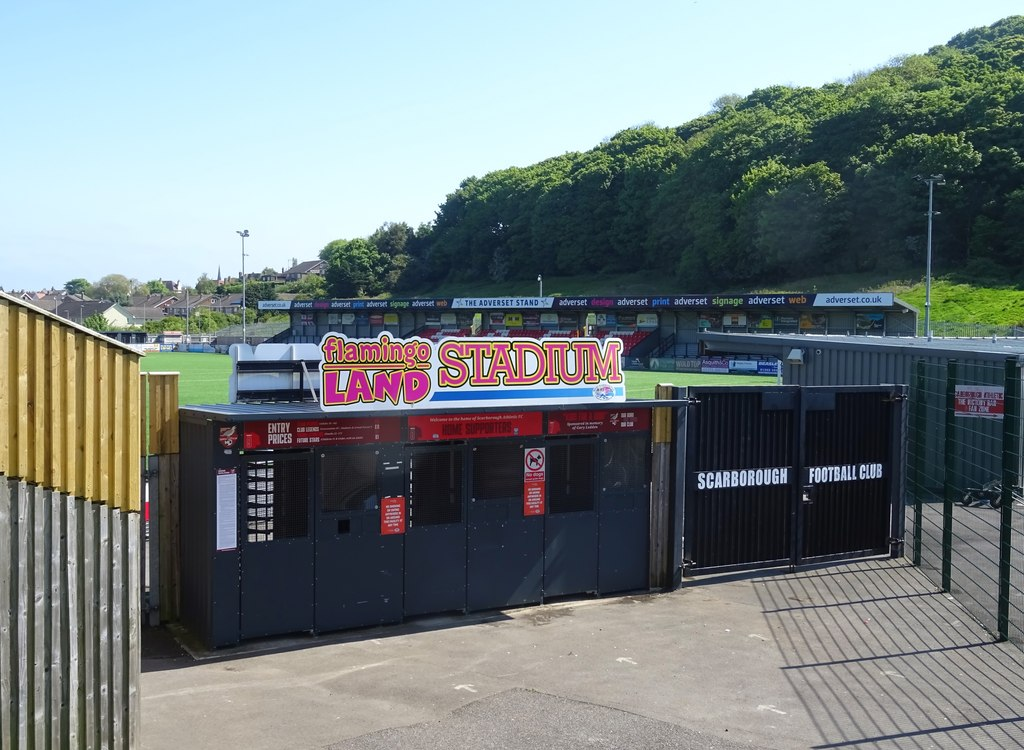
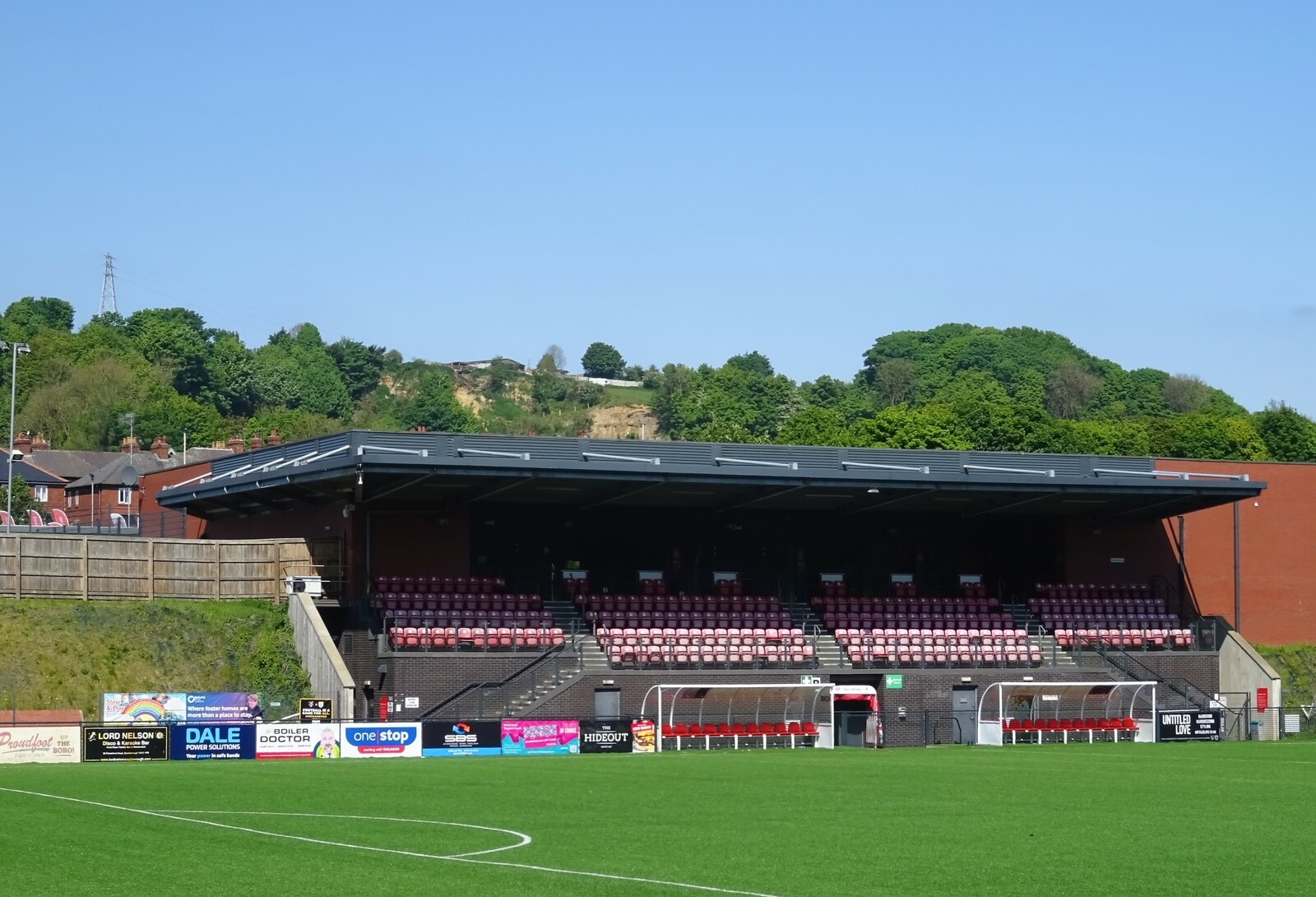
- Entrance to the Stadium The West Stand
- Interactive map of Scarborough Sports Village
- Location: Scarborough Sports Village, 5 Ashburn Road, Scarborough, North Yorkshire, YO11 2JW
- Coordinates: 54°16′11″N 0°24′49″W
- Owner: North Yorkshire Council
- Operator: Sports and Leisure Management Ltd
- Capacity: 3,252 (586 seated)
- Surface: Artificial turf

Construction
- Groundbreaking: 2015
- Built: 2016–2017
- Opened: 2017
- Main contractor: Willmott Dixon

Tenant
- Scarborough Athletic F.C. (2017–)

Scarborough Sports Village is a sports complex with a football stadium in Scarborough, North Yorkshire, England, it is the home ground of Scarborough Athletic F.C.

Construction of the stadium started in 2016 with the final opening coming in 2017. The main sponsor of the site, Flamingo Land, is off the A169 road between Malton and Pickering.

The first match to be played at the stadium was a friendly on 15 July 2017 versus a Sheffield United XI.

The stadium originally had a capacity 2,070 people, with 250 seats, but since the building of a new stand in summer 2019, the capacity had increased to 2,833 with 586 seats. After revaluation during the pre season of 2022-23 the ground capacity was further increased to 3,252, enough to satisfy National North stadium regulations. Further stadium developments are planned for the summer of 2023, including a covered stand, improved welfare facilities and seating in the away supporters, "swimming pool end". Also planned is a part fan funded Fanzone around the back of the Shed End stand. This will include the Victory Bar, office space and club shop.
