= Bill Stephenson =

Australian rules footballer

Personal information
- Full name: Bill Stephenson
- Born: 14 February 1937
- Died: 10 August 2010 (aged 73)
- Original team: Sale (LVFL)
- Height: 191 cm (6 ft 3 in)
- Weight: 86 kg (190 lb)
- Position: Forward / Ruckman

Playing career^{1}
Years	Club	Games (Goals)
1957–63	St Kilda	88 (139)
- ^{1} Playing statistics correct to the end of 1963.

Bill Stephenson (14 February 1937 – 10 August 2010) was a former Australian rules footballer who played with St Kilda in the Victorian Football League (VFL).

Stephenson, recruited to St Kilda from Sale, was a Victorian representative in 1960, against both South Australia and Western Australia. A ruckman and centre half-forward in his early years at St Kilda, Stephenson was used later on as a full-forward, in which position he started the 1962 VFL season strongly. Five first half goals against Essendon in round four had brought Stephenson's season tally to 20, before he sustained a knee injury later in the game which curtailed his career.
