= Jack Pelech =

John "Jack" Pelech OC (1934–2008) was a Canadian litigation and business lawyer.

He was an amateur sports volunteer organizer and the guiding force behind the Canada Games from 1969. He helped launch the Participaction fitness campaign. He chaired Hamilton's bids for the Pan-American Games and Commonwealth Games and helped organize the Road World Cycling Championships and World Judo Championships.

== Honours ==
- Hamilton Citizen of the Year, 1987
- McMaster Sports Hall of Fame Inductee, 1987
- Hamilton Gallery of Distinction Inductee, 2005
- Order of Canada, 2006
- The Jack Pelech Award named after him by Interprovincial Sport and Recreation Council to present to a provincial team best exemplifying performance and sportsmanship.
