= 2024–25 Hellenic Football League =

Football league season

The 2024–25 Hellenic Football League season is the 72nd in the history of the Hellenic Football League, a football competition in England. The league operates two divisions, the Premier Division at step 5 and Division One at step 6 of the National League System.

The allocations for steps 5 and 6 this season were announced by The Football Association on 17 May 2024.

== Premier Division ==
Hellenic Football League Premier Division
- Season: 2024–25
- Champions: Hartpury University
- Promoted: Hartpury University; Sporting Club Inkberrow
- Relegated: Malmesbury Victoria; Brimscombe & Thrupp

=== Team changes ===
To the Premier Division

Promoted from Division One

- Hartpury University
- Malmesbury Victoria
- Sporting Club Inkberrow

Resigned and demoted from Southern League Division One Central

- Cirencester Town

From the Premier Division

Promoted to Northern Premier League Division One Midlands

- Worcester City

Promoted to Southern League Division One South

- Cinderford Town

Relegated to Division One

- Wantage Town

Resigned from the league

- Hereford Lads Club

=== Premier Division table ===
| Pos | Team | Pld | W | D | L | GF | GA | GD | Pts | Promotion, qualification or relegation |
|---|---|---|---|---|---|---|---|---|---|---|
| 1 | Hartpury University (C, P) | 38 | 27 | 7 | 4 | 87 | 23 | +64 | 88 | Promotion to the Southern League South |
| 2 | Roman Glass St George | 38 | 26 | 5 | 7 | 106 | 50 | +56 | 83 | Qualification for the play-offs (Note: Four teams play for one spot and promotion to step 4) |
| 3 | Sporting Club Inkberrow (O, P) | 38 | 23 | 9 | 6 | 70 | 36 | +34 | 78 | Qualification for the play-offs |
| 4 | Mangotsfield United | 38 | 22 | 10 | 6 | 76 | 30 | +46 | 76 | Qualification for the play-offs |
| 5 | Highworth Town | 38 | 21 | 6 | 11 | 76 | 48 | +28 | 69 | Qualification for the play-offs |
| 6 | Worcester Raiders | 38 | 17 | 13 | 8 | 68 | 40 | +28 | 64 | |
| 7 | Royal Wootton Bassett Town | 38 | 19 | 7 | 12 | 78 | 58 | +20 | 64 | |
| 8 | Pershore Town | 38 | 19 | 6 | 13 | 86 | 58 | +28 | 63 | |
| 9 | Fairford Town | 38 | 16 | 10 | 12 | 66 | 50 | +16 | 58 | |
| 10 | Corsham Town | 38 | 15 | 6 | 17 | 62 | 72 | −10 | 51 | |
| 11 | Tuffley Rovers | 38 | 14 | 8 | 16 | 54 | 59 | −5 | 50 | |
| 12 | Thornbury Town | 38 | 14 | 3 | 21 | 58 | 78 | −20 | 45 | |
| 13 | Westfields | 38 | 12 | 8 | 18 | 68 | 54 | +14 | 44 | |
| 14 | Hereford Pegasus | 38 | 10 | 9 | 19 | 57 | 69 | −12 | 39 | |
| 15 | Cirencester Town | 38 | 11 | 6 | 21 | 51 | 72 | −21 | 39 | |
| 16 | Slimbridge | 38 | 11 | 6 | 21 | 61 | 92 | −31 | 39 | |
| 17 | Longlevens | 38 | 9 | 8 | 21 | 42 | 73 | −31 | 35 | |
| 18 | Lydney Town | 38 | 10 | 5 | 23 | 51 | 106 | −55 | 35 | |
| 19 | Malmesbury Victoria (R) | 38 | 8 | 4 | 26 | 44 | 105 | −61 | 27 (Note: Malmesbury Victoria were deducted one point for fielding an ineligible player.) | Relegation to Division One |
| 20 | Brimscombe & Thrupp (R) | 38 | 5 | 6 | 27 | 35 | 123 | −88 | 21 | Relegation to Division One |

Source: The FA
Rules for classification: 1) points; 2) goal difference; 3) number of goals scored; 4) number of matches won; 5) head-to-head results
(C) Champions; (O) Play-off winners; (P) Promoted; (R) Relegated

=== Results table ===
| Home \ Away | B&T | CIR | COR | FAI | HAR | HEP | HIG | LON | LYD | MAV | MAN | PER | RGG | RWB | SLI | SCI | THO | TUF | WES | WRA |
|---|---|---|---|---|---|---|---|---|---|---|---|---|---|---|---|---|---|---|---|---|
| Brimscombe & Thrupp | — | 3–1 | 1–4 | 1–2 | 0–3 | 3–2 | 0–5 | 1–1 | 1–0 | 0–8 | 1–2 | 2–3 | 0–2 | 2–4 | 2–2 | 2–3 | 1–4 | 0–2 | 0–11 | 0–3 |
| Cirencester Town | 5–0 | — | 2–6 | 0–3 | 0–3 | 2–0 | 1–2 | 1–4 | 3–1 | 0–1 | 0–3 | 0–2 | 3–4 | 1–2 | 0–2 | 0–0 | 2–2 | 0–3 | 1–0 | 3–3 |
| Corsham Town | 2–0 | 0–4 | — | 1–2 | 0–1 | 3–2 | 3–2 | 1–1 | 3–2 | 4–1 | 2–1 | 1–0 | 1–1 | 5–1 | 3–0 | 1–3 | 1–0 | 0–1 | 0–3 | 1–1 |
| Fairford Town | 3–0 | 2–2 | 2–0 | — | 1–3 | 2–1 | 1–3 | 1–0 | 4–0 | 6–1 | 1–1 | 0–5 | 0–1 | 1–2 | 1–1 | 1–2 | 3–1 | 3–0 | 1–1 | 1–2 |
| Hartpury University | 5–0 | 1–0 | 2–1 | 2–2 | — | 4–1 | 1–0 | 2–1 | 7–0 | 5–0 | 0–0 | 5–1 | 1–0 | 1–1 | 2–1 | 0–1 | 4–0 | 2–2 | 0–0 | 0–1 |
| Hereford Pegasus | 1–1 | 2–0 | 1–2 | 2–0 | 1–1 | — | 0–3 | 1–1 | 4–3 | 9–1 | 0–1 | 3–2 | 1–4 | 1–1 | 4–1 | 0–0 | 3–4 | 0–1 | 2–1 | 3–1 |
| Highworth Town | 6–0 | 2–0 | 3–1 | 1–1 | 3–2 | 2–0 | — | 2–2 | 1–3 | 2–1 | 1–1 | 1–2 | 1–3 | 0–2 | 5–0 | 0–3 | 3–0 | 3–3 | 1–0 | 1–0 |
| Longlevens | 1–0 | 0–3 | 1–1 | 1–1 | 0–5 | 1–3 | 0–1 | — | 0–2 | 3–1 | 0–2 | 2–4 | 0–2 | 0–2 | 1–3 | 1–3 | 2–3 | 1–0 | 2–0 | 1–1 |
| Lydney Town | 2–2 | 3–1 | 2–0 | 1–3 | 0–2 | 1–2 | 0–4 | 3–0 | — | 4–0 | 0–5 | 1–1 | 0–8 | 2–2 | 4–0 | 3–2 | 2–3 | 2–2 | 0–2 | 0–2 |
| Malmesbury Victoria | 1–1 | 0–1 | 1–1 | 0–2 | 0–1 | 4–2 | 2–1 | 0–2 | 0–2 | — | 1–3 | 0–5 | 1–7 | 3–0 | 2–1 | 0–4 | 3–6 | 3–1 | 2–0 | 0–1 |
| Mangotsfield United | 4–1 | 0–2 | 5–1 | 1–0 | 1–1 | 3–0 | 1–1 | 2–1 | 5–0 | 3–0 | — | 2–5 | 3–0 | 3–0 | 2–0 | 0–2 | 0–1 | 2–2 | 4–0 | 1–0 |
| Pershore Town | 3–0 | 1–1 | 3–1 | 2–3 | 1–4 | 2–0 | 2–2 | 5–1 | 7–0 | 7–1 | 1–4 | — | 3–2 | 1–2 | 3–1 | 1–1 | 2–0 | 0–2 | 2–0 | 0–1 |
| Roman Glass St George | 12–0 | 6–1 | 3–1 | 2–2 | 0–2 | 1–0 | 1–2 | 2–1 | 2–1 | 4–0 | 1–1 | 2–1 | — | 4–1 | 5–1 | 1–1 | 2–1 | 2–1 | 3–6 | 2–2 |
| Royal Wootton Bassett Town | 4–0 | 3–2 | 2–2 | 0–3 | 0–3 | 4–0 | 4–1 | 4–1 | 4–1 | 5–1 | 0–1 | 1–2 | 1–2 | — | 2–2 | 3–1 | 1–2 | 4–0 | 3–0 | 1–1 |
| Slimbridge | 0–4 | 1–0 | 5–2 | 0–3 | 1–0 | 1–1 | 0–3 | 2–3 | 10–1 | 3–1 | 1–3 | 3–3 | 2–4 | 3–6 | — | 2–4 | 0–2 | 2–1 | 1–0 | 3–3 |
| Sporting Club Inkberrow | 1–2 | 1–2 | 3–2 | 3–1 | 1–3 | 1–1 | 2–0 | 3–1 | 1–0 | 2–1 | 1–1 | 3–0 | 0–2 | 1–1 | 3–1 | — | 3–0 | 2–0 | 2–1 | 0–0 |
| Thornbury Town | 3–0 | 0–3 | 0–1 | 2–0 | 1–2 | 3–1 | 1–3 | 1–2 | 1–2 | 3–2 | 0–3 | 1–1 | 1–2 | 1–2 | 2–3 | 1–2 | — | 1–3 | 3–2 | 2–1 |
| Tuffley Rovers | 3–0 | 0–1 | 1–4 | 1–1 | 0–2 | 2–1 | 0–3 | 0–2 | 7–3 | 1–1 | 1–0 | 2–1 | 2–4 | 1–0 | 3–0 | 0–0 | 2–2 | — | 3–2 | 0–1 |
| Westfields | 2–2 | 4–1 | 3–0 | 2–2 | 0–2 | 2–2 | 5–1 | 1–1 | 5–0 | 3–0 | 0–0 | 2–0 | 0–2 | 1–2 | 1–2 | 0–1 | 4–0 | 2–1 | — | 0–3 |
| Worcester Raiders | 3–2 | 2–2 | 6–0 | 2–1 | 1–3 | 0–0 | 0–1 | 4–0 | 0–0 | 0–0 | 2–2 | 1–2 | 5–1 | 2–1 | 3–0 | 1–4 | 5–0 | 2–0 | 2–2 | — |

Source: The FA
Legend: Blue = home team win; Yellow = draw; Red = away team win.
For upcoming matches, an "a" indicates there is an article about the rivalry between the two participants.

=== Promotion playoffs ===
Semi-finals
3 | Sporting Club Inkberrow | 3
4 | Mangotsfield United | 0
2 | Roman Glass St George | 0
5 | Highworth Town | 1

Final
3 | Sporting Club Inkberrow | 1
5 | Highworth Town | 0

==== Semifinals ====
| 16 April | Roman Glass St George | 0–1 | Highworth Town | Almondsbury |
| 19:45 | | Report | Davis 90+2' | Stadium: Oaklands Park; Attendance: 210 |

| 16 April | Sporting Club Inkberrow | 3–0 | Mangotsfield United | Inkberrow |
| 19:45 | Guy; Skelton; McKenzie | Report | | Stadium: Recreation Ground; Attendance: 335 |

==== Final ====
| 23 April | Sporting Club Inkberrow | 1–0 | Highworth Town | Inkberrow |
| 19:45 | Tolley | Report | | Stadium: Recreation Ground; Attendance: 634 |

=== Stadia and locations ===
Location of 2024–25 Hellenic League Premier Division clubs
Location of 2024–25 Hellenic League Premier Division clubs (Gloucestershire)

| Team | Location | Stadium | Capacity |
|---|---|---|---|
| Brimscombe & Thrupp | Brimscombe | The Meadow | 1,000 |
| Cirencester Town | Cirencester | Corinium Stadium | 4,500 |
| Corsham Town | Corsham | Southbank | 1,200 |
| Fairford Town | Fairford | Cinder Lane | 2,000 |
| Hartpury University | Hartpury | Hartpury College | — |
| Hereford Pegasus | Hereford | Old School Lane | 2,000 |
| Highworth Town | Highworth | The Elms Recreation Ground | 2,000 |
| Longlevens | Gloucester | Saw Mills End | 500 |
| Lydney Town | Lydney | Lydney Recreation Ground | 700 |
| Malmesbury Victoria | Malmesbury | The Flying Monk Ground | 1,000 |
| Mangotsfield United | Mangotsfield | Cossham Street | 2,500 |
| Pershore Town | Pershore | Community Stadium | 4,000 |
| Roman Glass St George | Almondsbury | Oaklands Park | 2,000 |
| Royal Wootton Bassett Town | Royal Wootton Bassett | New Gerard Buxton Sports Ground | 2,000 |
| Slimbridge | Slimbridge | Thornhill Park | 1,500 |
| Sporting Club Inkberrow | Inkberrow | Recreation Ground | 500 |
| Thornbury Town | Thornbury | Mundy Playing Fields | 1,000 |
| Tuffley Rovers | Tuffley | Glevum Park | 1,000 |
| Westfields | Hereford | allpay.park | 2,000 |
| Worcester Raiders | Worcester | Sixways Stadium | 12,067 |

== Division One ==
Hellenic Football League Division One
- Season: 2024–25
- Champions: Droitwich Spa
- Promoted: Droitwich Spa; Abingdon United
- Relegated: Kidlington reserves

=== Team changes ===
To Division One

Promoted from the Herefordshire League Premier Division

- Wellington (Herefords)

Promoted from the Midland League Division Two

- Redditch Borough

Promoted from the Oxfordshire Senior League Premier Division

- Carterton

Promoted from the Shropshire County League Premier Division

- Ludlow

Relegated from the Premier Division

- Wantage Town

Relegated from the Midland League Premier Division

- Bewdley Town

Transferred from the Midland League Division One

- Droitwich Spa

From Division One

Promoted to the Premier Division

- Hartpury University
- Malmesbury Victoria
- Sporting Club Inkberrow

Transferred to the Western League First Division

- Calne Town
- Devizes Town

Folded or withdrew

- FC Bristol
- Long Crendon
- Moreton Rangers

=== Division One table ===
| Pos | Team | Pld | W | D | L | GF | GA | GD | Pts | Promotion, qualification or relegation |
|---|---|---|---|---|---|---|---|---|---|---|
| 1 | Droitwich Spa (C, P) | 32 | 25 | 4 | 3 | 107 | 33 | +74 | 79 | Promotion to the Premier Division |
| 2 | Redditch Borough | 32 | 22 | 2 | 8 | 72 | 37 | +35 | 68 | Qualification for the play-offs (Note: Four teams play for one spot and promotion to Step 5) |
| 3 | Clanfield 85 | 32 | 21 | 1 | 10 | 74 | 40 | +34 | 64 | Qualification for the play-offs |
| 4 | Abingdon United (O, P) | 32 | 20 | 4 | 8 | 73 | 41 | +32 | 64 | Qualification for the play-offs |
| 5 | Wantage Town | 32 | 19 | 6 | 7 | 80 | 47 | +33 | 63 | Qualification for the play-offs |
| 6 | FC Stratford | 32 | 19 | 6 | 7 | 71 | 46 | +25 | 63 | |
| 7 | Shortwood United | 32 | 16 | 4 | 12 | 51 | 44 | +7 | 52 | |
| 8 | Stonehouse Town | 32 | 14 | 9 | 9 | 63 | 50 | +13 | 51 | |
| 9 | Ludlow | 32 | 12 | 10 | 10 | 59 | 50 | +9 | 46 | |
| 10 | Bewdley Town | 32 | 10 | 6 | 16 | 60 | 62 | −2 | 36 | |
| 11 | Chipping Sodbury Town | 32 | 10 | 4 | 18 | 47 | 63 | −16 | 34 | |
| 12 | Tytherington Rocks (R) | 32 | 10 | 4 | 18 | 37 | 66 | −29 | 34 | Resigned from the league (Note: Tytherington Rocks resigned from the league on 11 June 2025 after the league allocations were announced for the following season to join the Gloucestershire County Football League.) |
| 13 | Kidlington reserves (R) | 32 | 9 | 5 | 18 | 31 | 64 | −33 | 32 | Relegation to a feeder league |
| 14 | Cheltenham Saracens | 32 | 7 | 5 | 20 | 29 | 56 | −27 | 26 | |
| 15 | Wellington (Herefords) | 32 | 7 | 2 | 23 | 48 | 92 | −44 | 23 | Reprieve from relegation |
| 16 | Newent Town | 32 | 6 | 4 | 22 | 30 | 82 | −52 | 22 | Reprieve from relegation |
| 17 | Carterton | 32 | 6 | 2 | 24 | 37 | 96 | −59 | 20 | Reprieve from relegation |
| 18 | Southam United | 0 | 0 | 0 | 0 | 0 | 0 | 0 | 0 | Resigned from the league (Note: Southam United resigned from the league on 15 February 2025 and their playing record of P24 W2 D1 L22 GF19 GA89 Pts7 was expunged.) |

Source: The FA
Rules for classification: 1) points; 2) goal difference; 3) number of goals scored; 4) number of matches won; 5) head-to-head results
(C) Champions; (O) Play-off winners; (P) Promoted; (R) Relegated

=== Results table ===
| Home \ Away | ABU | BEW | CAR | CHS | CST | CLA | DRS | STR | KID | LUD | NEW | REB | SWD | STO | TYR | WAN | WEL |
|---|---|---|---|---|---|---|---|---|---|---|---|---|---|---|---|---|---|
| Abingdon United | — | 2–1 | 5–1 | 0–1 | 3–1 | 4–1 | 1–1 | 2–2 | 2–1 | 3–1 | 7–0 | 0–3 | 0–1 | 2–4 | 1–0 | 2–3 | 7–3 |
| Bewdley Town | 1–2 | — | 5–2 | 2–0 | 4–1 | 1–2 | 1–3 | 1–4 | 4–0 | 2–0 | 2–1 | 1–2 | 2–3 | 2–2 | 2–2 | 2–2 | 3–2 |
| Carterton | 1–3 | 2–2 | — | 2–1 | 2–1 | 1–0 | 0–2 | 3–5 | 0–1 | 1–6 | 4–0 | 2–3 | 1–5 | 0–2 | 0–1 | 0–6 | 2–5 |
| Cheltenham Saracens | 0–3 | 3–2 | 1–0 | — | 1–1 | 0–3 | 1–3 | 3–2 | 3–0 | 0–1 | 2–1 | 1–3 | 0–1 | 1–3 | 0–1 | 0–1 | 2–1 |
| Chipping Sodbury Town | 2–3 | 2–0 | 2–0 | 4–1 | — | 4–2 | 1–6 | 0–1 | 2–3 | 0–3 | 1–0 | 0–3 | 0–1 | 2–3 | 0–2 | 2–2 | 0–3 |
| Clanfield 85 | 1–2 | 2–1 | 3–1 | 2–0 | 0–2 | — | 1–0 | 0–2 | 3–1 | 5–1 | 5–0 | 1–2 | 4–3 | 5–4 | 4–0 | 4–1 | 3–0 |
| Droitwich Spa | 1–2 | 6–2 | 8–0 | 1–1 | 3–1 | 1–0 | — | 1–0 | 4–0 | 3–0 | 5–2 | 3–0 | 3–1 | 1–3 | 5–0 | 4–1 | 4–1 |
| FC Stratford | 1–2 | 2–1 | 2–0 | 1–0 | 2–3 | 1–3 | 1–1 | — | 4–1 | 4–3 | 2–1 | 1–3 | 6–2 | 4–4 | 2–1 | 2–1 | 5–0 |
| Kidlington reserves | 1–0 | 1–1 | 0–2 | 1–1 | 1–0 | 1–0 | 1–5 | 1–2 | — | 1–1 | 3–1 | 1–1 | 0–2 | 0–1 | 2–1 | 1–1 | 4–1 |
| Ludlow | 2–0 | 2–1 | 5–1 | 2–2 | 0–0 | 2–2 | 1–1 | 1–1 | 5–1 | — | 2–0 | 1–2 | 3–1 | 3–1 | 0–1 | 2–3 | 3–1 |
| Newent Town | 0–2 | 3–4 | 2–1 | 1–0 | 0–3 | 0–5 | 2–6 | 2–3 | 1–0 | 1–1 | — | 1–0 | 3–1 | 0–0 | 1–4 | 1–6 | 2–0 |
| Redditch Borough | 0–2 | 2–1 | 6–0 | 2–1 | 3–1 | 1–3 | 5–6 | 0–2 | 4–0 | 2–1 | 4–0 | — | 1–0 | 0–0 | 4–0 | 1–2 | 4–0 |
| Shortwood United | 0–0 | 2–0 | 1–1 | 1–0 | 0–2 | 2–0 | 0–2 | 2–1 | 1–2 | 1–1 | 1–1 | 0–2 | — | 0–1 | 2–1 | 1–0 | 8–2 |
| Stonehouse Town | 3–0 | 0–0 | 6–1 | 2–2 | 4–4 | 0–2 | 0–4 | 1–2 | 4–0 | 2–2 | 2–0 | 1–2 | 0–2 | — | 3–2 | 2–1 | 3–1 |
| Tytherington Rocks | 2–4 | 1–3 | 1–0 | 2–1 | 1–5 | 1–5 | 0–3 | 1–1 | 2–1 | 0–2 | 2–2 | 1–2 | 0–1 | 2–1 | — | 0–1 | 1–0 |
| Wantage Town | 2–2 | 3–2 | 4–2 | 4–0 | 3–0 | 1–2 | 3–5 | 1–1 | 3–1 | 2–2 | 2–0 | 2–1 | 3–2 | 2–0 | 6–2 | — | 4–1 |
| Wellington (Herefords) | 0–5 | 1–4 | 2–4 | 3–0 | 3–0 | 0–1 | 1–6 | 1–2 | 2–0 | 5–0 | 2–1 | 2–4 | 2–3 | 1–1 | 2–2 | 0–4 | — |

Source: The FA
Legend: Blue = home team win; Yellow = draw; Red = away team win.
For upcoming matches, an "a" indicates there is an article about the rivalry between the two participants.

=== Promotion playoffs ===
Semi-finals
3 | Clanfield 85 | 0 (2)
4 | Abingdon United | 0 (4)
2 | Redditch Borough | 2
5 | Wantage Town | 3

Final
4 | Abingdon United | 2
5 | Wantage Town | 0

==== Semifinals ====
| 17 April | Clanfield 85 | 0–0 (a.e.t.) (2–3 p) | Abingdon United | Clanfield |
| 19:45 | | Report | | Stadium: Radcot Road; Attendance: 469 |

| 18 April | Redditch Borough | 2–3 | Wantage Town | Redditch |
| 19:00 | | Report | Crook 27', 66'; Robertson 55' | Stadium: The Cherry Tree Stadium |

==== Final ====
| 25 April | Abingdon United | 2–0 | Wantage Town | Abingdon-on-Thames |
| 19:45 | Haysham 55'; Odhiambo 68' | Report | | Stadium: The Northcourt; Attendance: 1,621 |

=== Stadiums and locations ===
Location of 2024–25 Hellenic League Division One clubs

| Team | Location | Stadium | Capacity |
|---|---|---|---|
| Abingdon United | Abingdon-on-Thames | The Northcourt | 2,000 |
| Bewdley Town | Bewdley | Ribbesford Meadows | 1,000 |
| Carterton | Carterton | Kilkenny Lane | 1,500 |
| Cheltenham Saracens | Cheltenham | Petersfield Park | 1,000 |
| Chipping Sodbury Town | Chipping Sodbury | The Ridings | 1,000 |
| Clanfield 85 | Clanfield | Radcot Road | 2,000 |
| Droitwich Spa | Droitwich Spa | King George V Ground | 2,000 (100 seated) |
| FC Stratford | Tiddington | Knights Lane | 3,000 |
| Kidlington reserves | Kidlington | Yarnton Road | 1,500 |
| Ludlow | Ludlow | Ludlow Football Stadium | 1,000 |
| Newent Town | Newent | Wildsmith Meadow | 1,000 |
| Redditch Borough | Redditch | The Cherry Tree Stadium | 3,000 |
| Shortwood United | Nailsworth | Meadowbank Ground | 2,000 |
| Southam United | Southam | Bobby Hancocks Park | 1,000 |
| Stonehouse Town | Stonehouse | Oldends Lane | 3,000 |
| Tytherington Rocks | Tytherington | Hardwicke Playing Field | 1,000 |
| Wantage Town | Wantage | Alfredian Park | 1,500 |
| Wellington (Herefords) | Wellington | Wellington Playing Fields | |
