= 2026–27 Hellenic Football League =

Football league season

The 2026–27 Hellenic Football League season is the 74th in the history of the Hellenic Football League, a football competition in England. The league operates two divisions, the Premier Division at step 5 and Division One at step 6 of the National League System.

The allocations for steps 5 and 6 this season were announced by The Football Association on 14 May 2026.

== Premier Division ==
Hellenic Football League Premier Division
- Season: 2026–27
- Matches: 380

=== Team changes ===
To the Premier Division

Promoted from Division One

- Malmesbury Victoria

Promoted from the Western League Division One

- Devizes Town

Transferred from the Midland League Premier Division

- Stourport Swifts

Transferred from the Western League Premier Division

- Bradford Town

From the Premier Division

Promoted to the Southern League Division One South

- Slimbridge
- Worcester Raiders

Relegated to Division One

- Lydney Town

=== Premier Division table ===
Pos	Team	Pld	W	D	L	GF	GA	GD	Pts	Promotion, qualification or relegation
1	Roman Glass St George	18	13	1	4	31	11	+20	40	Promoted to the Southern Football League
2	Hereford Pegasus	19	12	4	3	31	17	+14	40	Qualified for the play-offs
3	Highworth Town	19	11	3	5	41	22	+19	36	Qualified for the play-offs
4	Stourport Swifts	20	11	3	6	45	30	+15	36	Qualified for the play-offs
5	Pershore Town	18	11	2	5	36	25	+11	35	Qualified for the play-offs
6	Westfields	19	10	2	7	33	30	+3	32	
7	Cinderford Town	18	8	6	4	36	22	+14	30	
8	Devizes Town	16	9	2	5	24	15	+9	29	
9	Corsham Town	21	8	3	10	31	38	−7	27	
10	Longlevens	16	7	4	5	22	20	+2	25	
11	Thornbury Town	18	7	4	7	24	29	−5	25	
12	Fairford Town	19	6	6	7	22	27	−5	24	
13	Cirencester Town	15	6	5	4	31	23	+8	23	
14	Mangotsfield United	16	7	2	7	21	30	−9	23	
15	Hallen	19	6	4	9	25	30	−5	22	
16	Bradford Town	21	7	0	14	29	41	−12	21	
17	Droitwich Spa	20	5	4	11	34	37	−3	19	
18	Royal Wootton Bassett Town	20	4	6	10	17	31	−14	18	
19	Tuffley Rovers	19	5	2	12	28	43	−15	17	
20	Malmesbury Victoria	18	5	1	12	27	41	−14	16	Relegation to Division One
21	Cribbs	17	1	4	12	20	46	−26	7	Relegation to Division One

Updated to match(es) played on 21 November 2026. Source: The FA
Rules for classification: 1) points; 2) goal difference; 3) number of goals scored; 4) number of matches won; 5) head-to-head results

=== Results table ===
Home \ Away	BRA	CIN	CIR	COR	CRI	DEV	DRS	FAI	HAL	HEP	HIG	LON	MAL	MAN	PER	RGG	RWB	STS	THO	TUF	WES
Bradford Town	—																				
Cinderford Town		—																			
Cirencester Town			—																		
Corsham Town				—																	
Cribbs					—																
Devizes Town						—															
Droitwich Spa							—														
Fairford Town								—													
Hallen									—												
Hereford Pegasus										—											
Highworth Town											—										
Longlevens												—									
Malmesbury Victoria													—								
Mangotsfield United														—							
Pershore Town															—						
Roman Glass St George																—					
Royal Wootton Bassett Town																	—				
Stourport Swifts																		—			
Thornbury Town																			—		
Tuffley Rovers																				—	
Westfields																					—

Updated to match(es) played on unknown. Source: The FA
Legend: Blue = home team win; Yellow = draw; Red = away team win.
For upcoming matches, an "a" indicates there is an article about the rivalry between the two participants.

=== Stadia and locations ===
Location of 2026–27 Hellenic League Premier Division clubs
Location of 2026–27 Hellenic League Premier Division clubs (Gloucestershire)

Team	Location	Stadium	Capacity
Bradford Town	Bradford-on-Avon	Trowbridge Road	1,000
Cinderford Town	Cinderford	Causeway Ground	3,500
Cirencester Town	Cirencester	Corinium Stadium	4,500
Corsham Town	Corsham	Southbank	1,200
Cribbs	Cribbs Causeway	The Lawns	1,000
Devizes Town	Devizes	The Grist Environmental Stadium	2,500
Droitwich Spa	Droitwich Spa	King George V Ground	2,000 (100 seated)
Fairford Town	Fairford	Cinder Lane	2,000
Hallen	Hallen	Hallen Centre	2,000
Hereford Pegasus	Hereford	Old School Lane	2,000
Highworth Town	Highworth	The Elms Recreation Ground	2,000
Longlevens	Gloucester	Saw Mills End	500
Malmesbury Victoria	Malmesbury	The Flying Monk Ground	1,000
Mangotsfield United	Mangotsfield	Cossham Street	2,500
Pershore Town	Pershore	Community Stadium	4,000
Roman Glass St George	Almondsbury	Oaklands Park	2,000
Royal Wootton Bassett Town	Royal Wootton Bassett	New Gerard Buxton Sports Ground	2,000
Stourport Swifts	Stourport-on-Severn	Dunley Road	2,000
Thornbury Town	Thornbury	Mundy Playing Fields	1,000
Tuffley Rovers	Tuffley	Glevum Park	1,000
Westfields	Hereford	allpay.park	2,000

== Division One ==
Hellenic Football League Division One
- Season: 2026–27

=== Team changes ===
To Division One

Promoted from the Gloucestershire County League

- Sharpness

Promoted from the Herefordshire League Premier Division

- Bromyard Town

Promoted from the Wiltshire Senior League Premier Division

- Swindon Supermarine reserves

Relegated from the Premier Division

- Lydney Town

Relegated from the Midland League Premier Division

- Studley

From Division One

Promoted to the Premier Division

- Malmesbury Victoria

Promoted to the United Counties League Premier Division South

- FC Stratford

Transferred to the Spartan South Midlands Football League Division One

- Woodford United

Relegated to the Herefordshire League Premier Division

- Wellington (Herefords)

Relegated to the Oxfordshire Senior League Premier Division

- Thame United reserves

=== Division One table ===
Pos	Team	Pld	W	D	L	GF	GA	GD	Pts	Promotion, qualification or relegation
1	Alcester Town	19	12	3	4	31	15	+16	39	Promotion to the Premier Division
2	Wantage Town	14	11	2	1	38	13	+25	35	Qualification for the play-offs
3	Carterton	17	10	4	3	52	29	+23	34	Qualification for the play-offs
4	Bromyard Town	18	11	1	6	48	37	+11	34	Qualification for the play-offs
5	Sharpness	17	9	3	5	43	36	+7	30	Qualification for the play-offs
6	Cheltenham Saracens	18	8	4	6	44	32	+12	28	
7	Stonehouse Town	15	8	2	5	34	22	+12	26	
8	Clanfield 85	19	4	10	5	30	33	−3	22	
9	Bewdley Town	18	6	4	8	25	35	−10	22	
10	Studley	15	6	3	6	24	30	−6	21	
11	Lydney Town	15	5	4	6	20	23	−3	19	
12	Ludlow	15	5	4	6	21	26	−5	19	
13	Swindon Supermarine reserves	16	5	3	8	40	37	+3	18	
14	Redditch Borough	18	5	3	10	23	37	−14	18	
15	Brimscombe & Thrupp	18	4	5	9	25	39	−14	17	
16	Newent Town	19	2	10	7	29	39	−10	16	Possible relegation to a feeder league
17	Chipping Sodbury Town	19	4	4	11	27	44	−17	16	Possible relegation to a feeder league
18	Shortwood United	16	3	1	12	17	44	−27	10	Possible relegation to a feeder league

Updated to match(es) played on 21 November 2026. Source: The FA
Rules for classification: 1) points; 2) goal difference; 3) number of goals scored; 4) number of matches won; 5) head-to-head results

=== Results table ===
Home \ Away	ALC	BEW	B&T	BRO	CAR	CHS	CST	CLA	LUD	LYD	NEW	REB	SHA	SWD	STO	STU	SWS	WAN
Alcester Town	—																	
Bewdley Town		—																
Brimscombe & Thrupp			—															
Bromyard Town				—														
Carterton					—													
Cheltenham Saracens						—												
Chipping Sodbury Town							—											
Clanfield 85								—										
Ludlow									—									
Lydney Town										—								
Newent Town											—							
Redditch Borough												—						
Sharpness													—					
Shortwood United														—				
Stonehouse Town															—			
Studley																—		
Swindon Supermarine reserves																	—	
Wantage Town																		—

Updated to match(es) played on unknown. Source: The FA
Legend: Blue = home team win; Yellow = draw; Red = away team win.
For upcoming matches, an "a" indicates there is an article about the rivalry between the two participants.

=== Stadiums and locations ===
Location of 2026–27 Hellenic League Division One clubs
Location of 2026–27 Hellenic League Division One clubs (Gloucestershire)

Team	Location	Stadium	Capacity
Alcester Town	Alcester	Stratford Road	1,500
Bewdley Town	Bewdley	Ribbesford Meadows	1,000
Brimscombe & Thrupp	Brimscombe	The Meadow	1,000
Bromyard Town	Bromyard	Delahay Meadow	1,000
Carterton	Carterton	Kilkenny Lane	1,500
Cheltenham Saracens	Cheltenham	Petersfield Park	1,000
Chipping Sodbury Town	Chipping Sodbury	The Ridings	1,000
Clanfield 85	Clanfield	Radcot Road	2,000
Ludlow	Ludlow	Ludlow Football Stadium	1,000
Lydney Town	Lydney	Sansom Park	1,000
Newent Town	Newent	Wildsmith Meadow	1,000
Redditch Borough	Redditch	The Cherry Tree Stadium	3,000
Sharpness	Berkeley	Hamfields	1,000
Shortwood United	Nailsworth	Meadowbank Ground	2,000
Stonehouse Town	Stonehouse	Oldends Lane	3,000
Studley	Studley	Abbeyfields Drive	
Swindon Supermarine reserves	Swindon	Webbswood Stadium	2,600
Wantage Town	Wantage	Alfredian Park	1,500
