= Jennison Myrie-Williams =

English association football player

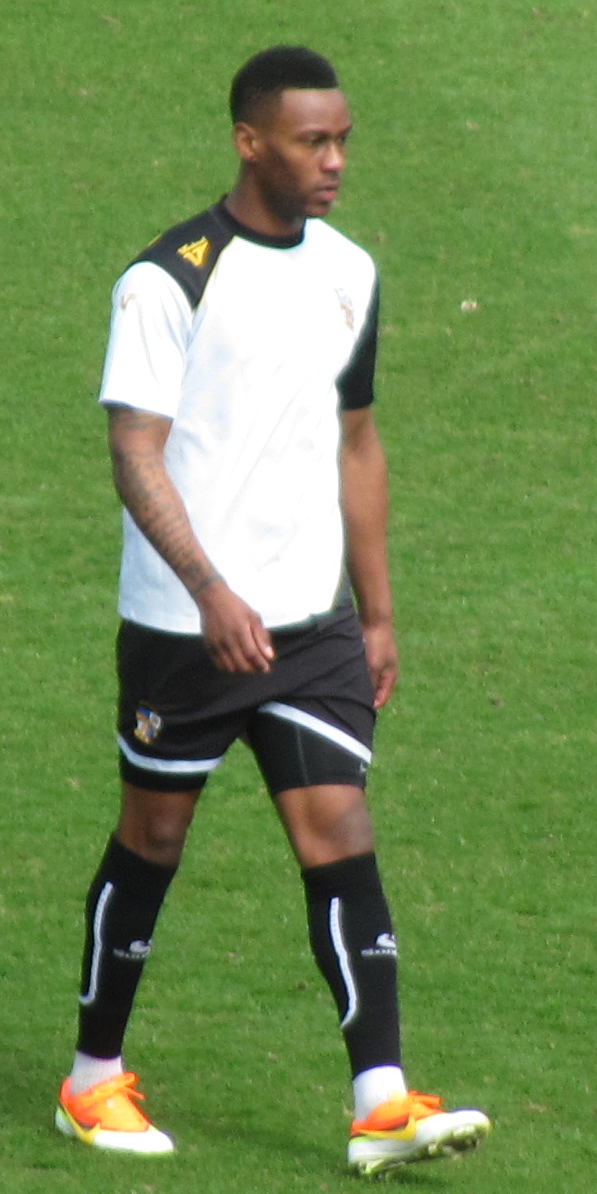
- Myrie-Williams warming up for Port Vale before the match against Northampton Town on 20 April 2013.

Personal information
- Full name: Jennison Machisti Myrie-Williams
- Date of birth: 17 May 1988 (age 38)
- Place of birth: Lambeth, England
- Height: 6 ft 0 in (1.83 m)
- Position: Winger

Team information
- Current team: Roman Glass St George

Youth career
- 2002–2006: Bristol City

Senior career*
| Years | Team | Apps | (Gls) |
| 2006–2009 | Bristol City | 26 | (2) |
| 2007 | → Cheltenham Town (loan) | 12 | (0) |
| 2007–2008 | → Tranmere Rovers (loan) | 25 | (3) |
| 2008 | → Cheltenham Town (loan) | 5 | (1) |
| 2008 | → Carlisle United (loan) | 8 | (0) |
| 2009 | → Hereford United (loan) | 15 | (2) |
| 2009–2010 | Dundee United | 25 | (2) |
| 2010–2011 | St Johnstone | 6 | (0) |
| 2011–2012 | Stevenage | 17 | (0) |
| 2011–2012 | → Port Vale (loan) | 6 | (1) |
| 2012–2014 | Port Vale | 82 | (16) |
| 2014–2015 | Scunthorpe United | 15 | (0) |
| 2015 | → Tranmere Rovers (loan) | 18 | (3) |
| 2015 | Sligo Rovers | 7 | (0) |
| 2016–2017 | Newport County | 23 | (1) |
| 2017–2018 | Torquay United | 10 | (0) |
| 2018 | Hereford | 19 | (7) |
| 2018–2019 | Weston-super-Mare | 18 | (2) |
| 2019–2020 | Gloucester City | 9 | (0) |
| 2020 | Weston-super-Mare | 0 | (0) |
| 2021 | Chippenham Town | 2 | (0) |
| 2024– | Roman Glass St George | 73 | (16) |

International career
- England U18
- * Club domestic league appearances and goals as of 17:15, 8 September 2026 (UTC)

Jennison Machisti Myrie-Williams (born 17 May 1988) is an English professional footballer who plays as a winger for Hellenic League Premier Division club Roman Glass St George.

Myrie-Williams began his career at Bristol City, progressing through the club's youth system and making his first-team debut in May 2006. He played regularly as the club won promotion to the Championship in the 2006–07 season and spent subsequent seasons on loan to Cheltenham Town, Tranmere Rovers, Carlisle United, and Hereford United to gain first-team experience. He was released by Bristol City in May 2009 and joined Scottish Premier League club Dundee United, later moving to St Johnstone in September 2010.

In July 2011, he signed for League One club Stevenage, spending time on loan at Port Vale before joining the club permanently in July 2012. He helped Port Vale secure promotion to League One in the 2012–13 season and was named in the PFA Team of the Year. Myrie-Williams later played for Scunthorpe United, Sligo Rovers, and Newport County, before a series of short-term spells with non-League clubs including Torquay United, Hereford, where he won the Southern League Premier Division title in 2017–18, Weston-super-Mare, Gloucester City, Chippenham Town, and Roman Glass St George, joining the latter in July 2024.

== Early life ==
Born in Lambeth, south London, Myrie-Williams aspired from an early age to play professional football and stated that he never considered an alternative career path. At the age of 14, he and his family relocated to Bristol to facilitate his involvement with Bristol City's academy.

== Club career ==
=== Bristol City ===
Having progressed through the youth system at Bristol City, Myrie-Williams made his first-team debut for the club on the final day of the 2005–06 season, coming on as a 61st-minute substitute in a 1–0 defeat at Southend United on 6 May 2006. He made three substitute appearances at the start of Bristol City's 2006–07 campaign, before making his first starting appearance in a 1–0 home victory against Brighton & Hove Albion on 2 September 2006. He scored his first professional goal in a 3–1 home victory against Chesterfield on 16 September 2006, scoring with a chipped shot to give Bristol City a two-goal advantage. Myrie-Williams made 35 appearances for the club during the 2006–07 season, scoring twice, as Bristol City secured automatic promotion to the Championship by finishing in second place.

==== Loan moves ====
Ahead of the 2007–08 season, Bristol City manager Gary Johnson stated his intention to send Myrie-Williams out on loan to gain first-team experience. Johnson believed that Myrie-Williams would benefit most from a loan move to a League One club, given that he had been playing in the third tier of English football prior to Bristol City's promotion to the Championship during the 2006–07 season. Two days before the start of the 2007–08 season, Myrie-Williams joined Cheltenham Town on a one-month loan. After making four first-team appearances for Cheltenham during the month, the loan was extended for a further month, running until 6 October 2007. Cheltenham manager John Ward stated: "I am really pleased that Jennison will be staying with us. In the last two or three games he has started to show his tremendous pace and ability on the ball". His loan was extended again in October 2007, taking him into a third month with Cheltenham. He scored his first goal for Cheltenham in a 3–1 away win at Swindon Town in the Football League Trophy on 9 October 2007. Myrie-Williams sustained a knee injury in training in October 2007, ruling him out of first-team action for two weeks. He made 13 appearances for Cheltenham during his three-month loan spell, scoring one goal, and returned to his parent club in early November 2007.

Following his loan spell at Cheltenham, Myrie-Williams joined Tranmere Rovers, also of League One, on a one-month loan agreement on 22 November 2007. The loan spell was extended for a further month on 19 December 2007, after Myrie-Williams had impressed manager Ronnie Moore during his initial four weeks with the club. Myrie-Williams scored his first goal for Tranmere on 26 January 2008, converting the winning goal from the penalty spot in a 2–1 victory against Yeovil Town at Prenton Park. Two days after scoring his first goal for the club, his loan spell was extended until the end of the 2007–08 season. Both managers were described as "delighted" with the progress Myrie-Williams was making at Tranmere, with Johnson adding: "Jennison's developing well at Tranmere and it would be criminal to bring him back now". He scored his second goal for Tranmere just five days later in a 2–0 away win at Leeds United; Myrie-Williams scored with an angled shot in the 61st minute to give Tranmere their fourth consecutive victory. He was substituted after 55 minutes in a 2–1 defeat at Walsall, a match in which he had scored the opening goal, due to an injury that ultimately ruled him out for the remainder of that season. He returned to Bristol City having scored three goals in 26 appearances for Tranmere.

At the start of the 2008–09 season, Myrie-Williams returned to Cheltenham Town, signing a one-month loan deal on 14 August 2008. On bringing Myrie-Williams back to the club, Cheltenham manager Keith Downing stated: "Jennison is an exciting young player who will give us some different options. We've perhaps been lacking a bit of pace and he will give us that as well". He made five appearances for Cheltenham during his one-month loan spell, scoring one goal, before returning to Bristol City on 15 September 2008. Shortly after his return, Myrie-Williams was loaned to another League One club, this time Carlisle United. He stated that the move appealed to him because of manager John Ward, under whom he had previously played at Cheltenham Town. He made his Carlisle debut on 20 September 2008, coming on as a 72nd-minute substitute in a 2–0 home defeat to Leeds United. The loan agreement was extended for a further month on 15 October 2008, making ten appearances in total during the loan agreement. Myrie-Williams was loaned out for a third time during the 2008–09 season, joining Hereford United on 23 January 2009. He scored his first goal for Hereford on 17 February 2009 in the club's 2–0 home victory over Leeds United, scoring with a low shot to give Hereford the lead just before half-time. He returned to Bristol City in February 2009, only to rejoin Hereford a month later, on a loan until the end of the season. He made 15 appearances across the two spells, scoring twice, as Hereford were relegated to League Two after finishing bottom of the table.

=== Dundee United ===
At the end of the 2008–09 season, Myrie-Williams was released by Bristol City. He joined Dundee United on a free transfer on 12 June 2009, signing a two-year contract with the Scottish Premier League club. Myrie-Williams made his Dundee United debut on 22 August 2009, coming on as an 88th-minute substitute in a 0–0 draw at St Mirren. He made his first league start on 17 October 2009, playing 84 minutes in a 1–1 home draw against Hamilton Academical, earning the Man of the Match award for his performance. He scored his first competitive goal for Dundee United in a 3–2 home win against St Mirren on 5 December 2009, scoring the club's third goal in the match. Myrie-Williams received the first red card of his career when he was sent off for two bookable offences in the club's 2–0 home defeat against Celtic on 25 April 2010. He played in the club's 2–0 victory over Raith Rovers in the Scottish Cup semi-final, but was not selected for the final at Hampden Park. He made 27 appearances in his first season at the club, scoring twice.

He remained at Dundee United ahead of the 2010–11 season and made his first appearance in a 1–1 draw with St Mirren on 14 August 2010, appearing as a substitute in the 74th minute. It proved to be Myrie-Williams' only appearance for the club at the start of the campaign, and four days later, on 18 August, Dundee United manager Peter Houston informed him that he was available for transfer in order to reduce the club's wage bill. Shortly before the summer transfer window closed, on 31 August 2010, Myrie-Williams departed the club by mutual consent.

=== St Johnstone ===
Myrie-Williams signed for another Scottish Premier League club, St Johnstone, on 14 September 2010, joining on a free transfer. He signed a short-term deal lasting until January 2011 made his debut in St Johnstone's 2–1 home victory over St Mirren on 18 September 2010. After two appearances in two home defeats in quick succession against Celtic in late October 2010, Myrie-Williams did not feature again for two months. His final appearance for the club came as an 89th-minute substitute in a 2–0 away defeat to Celtic at Celtic Park on 26 December 2010. Shortly after the game, he was informed by manager Derek McInnes that he was free to find a new club, with his contract set to expire at the end of January 2011. Myrie-Williams made eight appearances for St Johnstone during his three-month spell with the club.

Shortly after leaving St Johnstone, Myrie-Williams opted to return to England, signing for League Two club Oxford United on 27 January 2011 for the rest of the 2010–11 campaign. However, the transfer was voided as a result of Myrie-Williams having already played for two clubs during the 2010–11 season: one appearance for Dundee United and eight for St Johnstone. Under FIFA regulations, a player is not permitted to play for more than two permanent clubs in official competitions during a single season. The English Football Association was unable to register Myrie-Williams, as it is bound by FIFA regulations. Similarly, the English Football League could not register him to play for Oxford United, as his international clearance could not be granted.

=== Stevenage ===
Having not made any appearances during the first half of the year, Myrie-Williams signed for League One club Stevenage on a free transfer on 8 July 2011. He made his debut for Stevenage in a 3–1 away victory against AFC Bournemouth on 16 August 2011, coming on as a 74th-minute substitute and providing the assist for Stevenage's third goal.

After making just one starting appearance for Stevenage in the opening months of the 2011–12 season, Myrie-Williams joined League Two club Port Vale on loan on 24 November 2011, on an agreement until January 2012. A day later, he made his debut for Port Vale in a 0–0 home draw against Torquay United, playing the full match. During the game, he impressed manager Micky Adams, who praised Myrie-Williams for his positive attitude, character, and ability to excite the fans with his performance. In his next appearance for the club, he scored the equalising goal in a 2–1 win at Dagenham & Redbridge, with a shot from 25 yards. Myrie-Williams' effort was Vale's first goal in 502 minutes (more than five games) of football. He returned to Broadhall Way in January, having scored one goal in six matches for Port Vale, who were unable to extend the loan deal due to an acute lack of funds.

On his return to Stevenage, Myrie-Williams was made available for transfer by manager Graham Westley after being informed he did not feature in Westley's plans. Both Port Vale and Sheffield United were reportedly interested in signing the player on a permanent basis. League Two club Bradford City also held discussions with Stevenage regarding a potential transfer for Myrie-Williams, although negotiations were paused following Westley's departure, as new manager Gary Smith wished to evaluate the squad. No transfer materialised, and he came on as a late substitute in Stevenage's 2–0 defeat to Charlton Athletic on 25 February 2012, marking his first appearance for Stevenage in five months. Myrie-Williams made 19 appearances for Stevenage in all competitions during the season. Despite an increase in first-team involvement under Smith, he was released by Stevenage when his contract expired in May 2012.

=== Port Vale ===
"It's been my best season so far, and my most enjoyable season so far. I have to give many thanks to the gaffer, because he's stuck with me this season. I have tried to repay him and the club for the faith they've shown in me."

— Myrie-Williams speaking towards the end of the 2012–13 campaign.

Myrie-Williams joined Port Vale on a free transfer on 2 July 2012, signing a two-year contract having impressed during his brief loan spell at the club during the 2011–12 season. He scored both goals in a 2–0 victory over Tranmere Rovers in the Football League Trophy on 4 September 2012, converting a penalty and a 30-yard (27 m) free kick, which he described as "up there with the best goals I've scored". Myrie-Williams was named in the League Two Team of the Week following his goal and performance in a 3–1 win at Aldershot Town on 26 November 2012. Towards the latter stages of the 2012–13 season, League Two managers voted him the fifth-best Player of the Season at the annual Football League Awards. Port Vale secured promotion with a third-place finish at the end of the season, and Myrie-Williams finished with nine assists and 11 goals in 50 appearances. He was voted onto the PFA Team of the Year, alongside teammate Tom Pope.

He lost his first-team place in mid-October of the 2013–14 season after Adams changed the team's system, before he marked his return to the starting line-up with a brace against Shortwood United in the FA Cup. He ended the season with ten goals in 46 appearances, helping the club to secure a ninth-place finish in League One. Following a public vote conducted by The Sentinel in February 2020, Myrie-Williams was named as Port Vale's second-best winger of the 2010s, receiving 32% of the vote, behind David Worrall, who received 44%. Upon his departure, Adams thanked Myrie-Williams for his contributions, describing him as a player capable of brilliance but also inconsistency, and expressed disappointment with his decision to join Scunthorpe United, suggesting it was motivated by financial gain rather than career progression.

=== Scunthorpe United ===
Myrie-Williams rejected a contract extension with Port Vale to sign a two-year deal with newly promoted League One club Scunthorpe United on 11 June 2014. He made 20 appearances in all competitions during the first half of the 2014–15 season, before joining League Two club Tranmere Rovers on loan in January 2015, reuniting with former Port Vale manager, Micky Adams. Tranmere were relegated from the Football League at the end of the season, and Myrie-Williams became a free agent in the summer after his contract with Scunthorpe was terminated by mutual consent.

=== Sligo Rovers ===
He had trials with both Bristol Rovers and Yeovil Town in summer 2015. At the end of the month, he signed with League of Ireland Premier Division club Sligo Rovers, managed by Adams, who had also signed Myrie-Williams during his time as manager at Port Vale and Tranmere. He made eight appearances for Sligo before departing in January 2016.

=== Newport County ===
Without a club for six months, Myrie-Williams signed a one-year contract with Newport County of League Two on 16 June 2016. He made his debut for Newport on 6 August 2016 in a 3–2 defeat to Mansfield Town at Rodney Parade, and scored his first competitive goal for the club ten days later in a 2–1 defeat at Luton Town. He impressed manager Graham Westley in December 2016, when he deputised at left-back and was described as "concentrated and focused, determined and resilient in defence". Myrie-Williams made 30 appearances and scored two goals during the season, opting to leave Newport after rejecting the offer of a new contract in July 2017.

=== Non-League ===
Myrie-Williams joined National League club Torquay United on non-contract terms on 15 September 2017, arriving two days after the appointment of head coach Gary Owers. He made 10 league appearances for Torquay during the 2017–18 season, of which three were starts, before departing the club on 12 February 2018. He subsequently joined Southern League Premier Division club Hereford on 23 February 2018. He scored on his Hereford debut the following day, helping his new club to a 2–0 victory over Weymouth at Edgar Street. The goal was later named as the club's Goal of the Season. He scored a hat-trick during a 5–1 victory over Gosport Borough on 24 March 2018, and helped Hereford to win the league title at the end of the 2017–18 season. Myrie-Williams left the club on 5 October 2018 after making only six National League North appearances at the start of the 2018–19 season. He joined National League South club Weston-super-Mare on 16 November 2018, scoring two goals in 18 appearances as the club were relegated at the end of the 2018–19 season.

Myrie-Williams signed for National League North club Gloucester City on 11 June 2019, following former Weston-super-Mare teammate Marlon Jackson. Upon signing the duo, manager Mike Cook commented that "this has been a long drawn out process and we are delighted to secure their quality and experience". He was released by Gloucester in January after making nine league appearances. He rejoined Weston-super-Mare in March 2020. Due to the COVID-19 pandemic in England, the 2019–20 Southern Football League season was formally abandoned on 26 March 2020, with all results from the season expunged. He joined Chippenham Town of the National League South on 19 August 2021, making two brief substitute appearances during the 2021–22 season. Having not played competitive football for three years, Myrie-Williams joined Hellenic League Premier Division club Roman Glass St George in July 2024, scoring 13 goals in 42 appearances during the 2024–25 season as they were defeated in the play-off semi-finals by Highworth Town. He scored six goals in 36 games throughout the 2025–26 season, as Roman Glass St George reached the play-off semi-finals, where they were beaten 2–1 by Worcester Raiders.

== International career ==
Myrie-Williams represented England at under-18 level.

== Style of play ==
Predominantly deployed as a winger throughout his career, Myrie-Williams can play on either flank. He is predominantly left-footed. Myrie-Williams states that he is much more comfortable on the right wing, where he can cut inside and shoot. Described as possessing "searing pace and an impressive left foot", which consistently unsettles defenders, Myrie-Williams cites his greatest strengths as his willingness to take on defenders, confidence on the ball, and pace. He also highlights his vision for creating goalscoring opportunities and gets as much enjoyment assisting goals as he does scoring them. Myrie-Williams often takes set-pieces and has been described as a "dangerous crosser of the ball".

In June 2009, Steve Claridge described Myrie-Williams as a "priceless asset" for his ability to transition defence into attack and alleviate defensive pressure: "Whenever he was given time and space to run at the opposition he looked dangerous and comfortable with the ball at his feet. This appears to be a side to his game that comes naturally. As the match became stretched, he quickly turned defence into attack with lung-bursting 50 yards (46 m) runs". However, Claridge noted that Myrie-Williams tended to overcomplicate his play and needed to focus on "simplifying his game" to better "assess the situation". Myrie-Williams acknowledges that his heading ability is a weakness in his game. He also states that managers have frequently advised him to track back more and contribute further to defensive duties.

== Personal life ==
He has a daughter, born in 2011.

== Career statistics ==
As of match played 5 September 2026

Appearances and goals by club, season and competition
| Club | Season | League | | | National cup (Note: Includes FA Cup, FAI Cup, Scottish Cup) | | League cup (Note: Includes Football League Cup, League of Ireland Cup, Scottish League Cup) | | Other | | Total | |
| Club | Season | Division | Apps | Goals | Apps | Goals | Apps | Goals | Apps | Goals | Apps | Goals |
|---|---|---|---|---|---|---|---|---|---|---|---|---|
| Bristol City | 2005–06 | League One | 1 | 0 | 0 | 0 | 0 | 0 | 0 | 0 | 1 | 0 |
| Bristol City | 2006–07 | League One | 25 | 2 | 5 | 0 | 1 | 0 | 4 (Note: Appearance(s) in Football League Trophy) | 0 | 35 | 2 |
| Bristol City | 2007–08 | Championship | 0 | 0 | 0 | 0 | 0 | 0 | 0 | 0 | 0 | 0 |
| Bristol City | 2008–09 | Championship | 0 | 0 | 0 | 0 | 0 | 0 | 0 | 0 | 0 | 0 |
| Bristol City | Total | | 26 | 2 | 5 | 0 | 1 | 0 | 4 | 0 | 36 | 2 |
| Cheltenham Town (loan) | 2007–08 | League One | 12 | 0 | 0 | 0 | 0 | 0 | 1 | 1 | 13 | 1 |
| Tranmere Rovers (loan) | 2007–08 | League One | 25 | 3 | 1 | 0 | — | | — | | 26 | 3 |
| Cheltenham Town (loan) | 2008–09 | League One | 5 | 1 | 0 | 0 | 0 | 0 | 0 | 0 | 5 | 1 |
| Carlisle United (loan) | 2008–09 | League One | 8 | 0 | 1 | 0 | 0 | 0 | 1 | 0 | 10 | 0 |
| Hereford United (loan) | 2008–09 | League One | 15 | 2 | — | | — | | — | | 15 | 2 |
| Dundee United | 2009–10 | Scottish Premier League | 24 | 2 | 1 | 0 | 2 | 0 | — | | 27 | 2 |
| Dundee United | 2010–11 | Scottish Premier League | 1 | 0 | 0 | 0 | 0 | 0 | 0 | 0 | 1 | 0 |
| Dundee United | Total | | 25 | 2 | 1 | 0 | 2 | 0 | 0 | 0 | 28 | 2 |
| St Johnstone | 2010–11 | SPL | 6 | 0 | 0 | 0 | 2 | 0 | — | | 8 | 0 |
| Stevenage | 2011–12 | League One | 17 | 0 | 1 | 0 | 0 | 0 | 1 (Note: Appearance in 2012 League One play-offs) | 0 | 19 | 0 |
| Port Vale | 2011–12 | League Two | 6 | 1 | — | | — | | — | | 6 | 1 |
| Port Vale | 2012–13 | League Two | 44 | 9 | 2 | 0 | 1 | 0 | 3 | 2 | 50 | 11 |
| Port Vale | 2013–14 | League One | 38 | 7 | 5 | 3 | 1 | 0 | 2 | 0 | 46 | 10 |
| Port Vale | Total | | 88 | 17 | 7 | 3 | 2 | 0 | 5 | 2 | 102 | 22 |
| Scunthorpe United | 2014–15 | League One | 15 | 0 | 2 | 0 | 1 | 0 | 2 | 0 | 20 | 0 |
| Tranmere Rovers (loan) | 2014–15 | League Two | 18 | 3 | — | | — | | — | | 18 | 3 |
| Sligo Rovers | 2015 | League of Ireland Premier | 7 | 0 | 1 | 0 | 0 | 0 | 0 | 0 | 8 | 0 |
| Newport County | 2016–17 | League Two | 23 | 1 | 4 | 0 | 1 | 0 | 2 (Note: Appearances in EFL Trophy) | 1 | 30 | 2 |
| Torquay United | 2017–18 | National League | 10 | 0 | 1 | 0 | — | | 1 (Note: Appearance in FA Trophy) | 0 | 12 | 0 |
| Hereford | 2017–18 | Southern League Premier Division | 13 | 7 | — | | — | | 1 | 1 | 14 | 8 |
| Hereford | 2018–19 | National League North | 6 | 0 | 0 | 0 | — | | 3 | 0 | 9 | 0 |
| Hereford | Total | | 19 | 7 | 0 | 0 | 0 | 0 | 4 | 1 | 23 | 8 |
| Weston-super-Mare | 2018–19 | National League South | 18 | 2 | 0 | 0 | — | | 1 | 0 | 19 | 2 |
| Gloucester City | 2019–20 | National League North | 9 | 0 | 0 | 0 | — | | 0 | 0 | 9 | 0 |
| Chippenham Town | 2021–22 | National League South | 2 | 0 | 0 | 0 | — | | 0 | 0 | 2 | 0 |
| Roman Glass St George | 2024–25 | Hellenic League Premier Division | 34 | 11 | 0 | 0 | — | | 8 (Note: Two appearances in FA Vase; four appearances and two goals in UHL Floodlit Cup; one appearance in UHL Challenge Cup; one appearance in 2025 Hellenic League Premier Division play-offs) | 2 | 42 | 13 |
| Roman Glass St George | 2025–26 | Hellenic League Premier Division | 33 | 5 | 1 | 1 | — | | 2 (Note: Appearances in UHL Challenge Cup) | 0 | 36 | 6 |
| Roman Glass St George | 2026–27 | Hellenic League Premier Division | 6 | 0 | 1 | 0 | — | | 0 | 0 | 7 | 0 |
| Roman Glass St George | Total | | 73 | 16 | 2 | 1 | 0 | 0 | 10 | 2 | 85 | 19 |
| Career totals (Note: Statistics for Hereford in the 2017–18 season not known.) | | | 421 | 56 | 26 | 4 | 9 | 0 | 32 | 7 | 488 | 67 |

== Honours ==
Bristol City

- Football League One second-place promotion: 2006–07

Dundee United

- Scottish Cup: 2009–10

Port Vale

- Football League Two third-place promotion: 2012–13

Hereford

- Southern Football League Premier Division: 2017–18

Individual

- PFA Team of the Year: 2012–13 League Two
