= 2015–16 Southern Football League =

The 2015–16 season was the 113th in the history of the Southern League, which is an English football competition featuring semi-professional and amateur clubs from the South West, South Central and Midlands of England and South Wales. From the 2014–15 season onwards, the Southern League is known as Evo-Stik League Southern, following a sponsorship deal with Evo-Stik.

The league constitution was announced on 15 May 2015.

After the constitution was announced, Clevedon Town of Division One South & West were demoted because their floodlights were not to the required standard. As a result, Ware were transferred to Division One Central from Isthmian League Division One North, Fleet Town and Petersfield Town were transferred from Division One South & West to Division One Central, and Burnham, Marlow and newly promoted Flackwell Heath were transferred in the opposite direction.

Flackwell Heath subsequently decided to refuse their promotion and stay in the Hellenic League. Redhill, who had been relegated from Isthmian League Division One South, were offered Flackwell Heath's place, but they refused due to travelling and financial reasons. Their position was then offered to Wessex League runners-up Winchester City, who accepted.

== Premier Division ==
The Premier Division consisted of 24 clubs, including 18 clubs from the previous season and six new clubs:

- Two clubs promoted from Division One Central:
  - Bedworth United
  - Kettering Town
- Two clubs promoted from Division One South & West:
  - Merthyr Town
  - Stratford Town
- Plus:
  - King's Lynn Town, transferred from the Northern Premier League
  - Leamington, relegated from Conference North

=== League table ===
Southern Football League Premier Division
- Season: 2015–16
- Champions: Poole Town
- Promoted: Hungerford Town; Poole Town
- Relegated: Bedworth United; Bideford; Histon; Paulton Rovers
- Matches: 552
- Goals: 1,583 (2.87 per match)
- Top goalscorer: Andy Sandell
- Biggest home win: Redditch United 8 – 1 Bedworth United, 16 January 2016
- Biggest away win: Histon 0 – 7 Poole Town, 24 November 2015
- Highest scoring: Kettering Town 5 – 4 Histon, 17 October 2015
- Highest attendance: 1808 – Weymouth 2 – 2 Dorchester Town, 26 December 2015
- Lowest attendance: 54 – Cirencester Town 3 – 0 Paulton Rovers, 23 February 2016
- Total attendance: 149,290
- Average attendance: 300

Pos	Team	Pld	W	D	L	GF	GA	GD	Pts	Promotion or relegation
1	Poole Town	46	27	12	7	86	35	+51	93	Promoted to the National League South
2	Redditch United	46	24	15	7	82	37	+45	84 (Note: Redditch United were deducted three points for fielding ineligible players.)	Qualified for the play-offs
3	Hitchin Town	46	24	12	10	78	50	+28	84	Qualified for the play-offs
4	Hungerford Town	46	24	11	11	73	43	+30	83	Qualified for the play-offs, then promoted to the National League South
5	Leamington	46	23	12	11	59	38	+21	81	Qualified for the play-offs
6	Kettering Town	46	24	8	14	83	53	+30	80	
7	Weymouth	46	21	14	11	63	39	+24	77	
8	Chippenham Town	46	21	13	12	76	53	+23	76	
9	King's Lynn Town	46	21	7	18	58	54	+4	70	
10	Merthyr Town	46	19	9	18	69	58	+11	66	
11	Chesham United	46	18	10	18	72	70	+2	64	
12	Dunstable Town	46	17	11	18	68	68	0	62	
13	Dorchester Town	46	18	8	20	67	69	−2	62	
14	Biggleswade Town	46	17	9	20	76	82	−6	60	
15	Cirencester Town	46	18	6	22	67	76	−9	60	
16	Frome Town	46	14	16	16	51	73	−22	58	
17	Slough Town	46	16	9	21	67	77	−10	57	
18	Cambridge City	46	15	7	24	63	80	−17	52	
19	Stratford Town	46	13	11	22	59	68	−9	50	
20	St Neots Town	46	10	18	18	69	78	−9	48	
21	Bedworth United	46	12	8	26	58	107	−49	44	Relegated to Northern Premier League Division One South
22	Histon	46	11	7	28	63	98	−35	40	Relegated to Division One Central
23	Bideford	46	8	13	25	38	88	−50	37	Relegated to Division One South & West
24	Paulton Rovers	46	8	12	26	38	89	−51	36	Relegated to Division One South & West

Source: fchd.com
Rules for classification: 1) points; 2) goal difference; 3) number of goals scored.

==== Top scorers ====
As of 25 April 2016

Player	Club	Goals
Andy Sandell	Chippenham Town	22
Tom Meechan	St Neots Town	21
Charlie Griffin	Cirencester Town	21
Benjamin Whitehead	Chippenham Town	21
Nathaniel Jarvis	Hungerford Town	19
Jordan Archer	Bedworth Town	19
Ryan Prosser	Merthyr Town	18
Jonny McNamara	Hitchin Town	17
Sam Merson	Redditch United	17

==== Play-offs ====
Semifinals
2	Redditch United	1(1)
5	Leamington	1(3)
3	Hitchin Town	2
4	Hungerford Town	3

Final
4	Hungerford Town	2
5	Leamington	1

Semi-finals

27 April 2016	Hitchin Town	2–3	Hungerford Town	Top Field, Hitchin
	B Donelly 56' Burns 59'		Rees 64' Clark 75' Brown 84'	Attendance: 1,305

27 April 2016	Redditch United	1–1 (a.e.t.) (1-3 p)	Leamington	The Valley, Redditch
	Sammons 35'		Baker-Richardson 90+4'	Attendance: 1,303

Final

2 May 2016	Hungerford Town	2–1	Leamington	Bulpit Lane, Hungerford
	Brown 64'; Jones 84'		Baker-Richardson 20'	Attendance: 1,363

=== Results ===
Home \ Away	BWU	BID	BIG	CAM	CHE	CHI	CIR	DOR	DUN	FRO	HIS	HIT	HUN	KET	KLT	LEA	MER	PAU	POO	RED	SLO	STN	STR	WEY
Bedworth United		2–2	2–4	4–3	3–1	0–2	0–1	1–0	1–2	2–2	3–2	1–2	0–2	1–1	3–0	2–0	1–2	1–1	0–2	1–2	2–1	0–6	0–4	3–2
Bideford	2–1		0–0	1–1	0–0	0–1	1–1	2–3	0–0	2–0	0–5	0–0	1–2	2–0	0–5	1–1	0–1	0–1	1–2	0–5	2–1	4–4	1–1	0–2
Biggleswade Town	4–1	0–2		3–2	2–2	0–1	1–0	1–0	3–3	3–0	2–1	3–5	1–4	1–3	2–4	3–2	0–3	4–1	0–1	1–1	5–1	5–2	4–3	1–1
Cambridge City	4–2	2–0	2–2		1–0	0–3	1–2	0–3	1–1	2–1	1–2	0–1	3–1	0–4	1–3	1–2	1–0	2–0	1–2	0–2	4–2	1–4	2–0	1–0
Chesham United	4–2	3–1	1–1	1–3		1–0	1–3	3–4	5–1	5–1	2–0	1–1	2–2	0–3	2–0	3–0	0–1	2–1	3–1	3–0	1–1	3–1	2–0	1–0
Chippenham Town	5–0	2–0	3–2	1–3	2–2		0–1	3–1	4–1	1–1	3–0	1–1	1–1	0–2	4–1	4–3	1–0	3–0	0–1	0–3	3–3	1–1	2–1	1–1
Cirencester Town	2–3	3–4	2–1	1–1	3–0	1–4		4–3	1–5	1–1	1–2	0–0	2–3	1–0	0–1	1–2	1–0	3–0	3–0	0–2	1–3	2–5	3–0	0–3
Dorchester Town	3–2	1–2	0–1	3–0	2–1	1–1	1–1		0–0	0–0	3–0	0–1	0–1	1–4	2–0	0–1	1–1	6–0	1–5	1–5	1–2	1–0	3–1	1–0
Dunstable Town	1–2	5–0	2–1	3–1	1–1	1–2	0–2	1–0		3–2	4–2	0–0	1–0	4–0	0–2	0–2	2–1	1–2	1–1	1–2	1–3	3–0	3–1	2–1
Frome Town	2–1	3–0	2–1	0–4	1–1	1–0	3–2	0–3	4–3		2–2	0–4	0–2	1–2	1–0	0–0	1–1	1–0	0–0	1–1	2–1	3–2	2–0	1–1
Histon	4–1	3–2	1–2	2–3	3–1	0–0	3–3	0–1	3–1	1–3		5–1	0–3	3–1	1–2	0–3	0–2	1–1	0–7	0–0	1–2	0–0	0–2	1–4
Hitchin Town	3–1	0–0	3–0	4–2	5–1	1–1	2–0	3–2	4–1	1–2	3–2		2–1	2–1	2–0	2–2	2–0	2–0	0–0	1–2	3–1	2–0	2–3	1–0
Hungerford Town	5–1	2–0	1–0	2–0	3–1	1–0	1–2	2–3	2–3	4–0	1–0	1–1		2–1	2–1	1–2	1–0	3–1	0–0	0–0	1–0	3–3	0–0	0–1
Kettering Town	0–1	7–0	2–1	0–0	3–0	1–2	4–3	3–0	3–1	1–1	5–4	1–1	2–1		2–1	1–1	3–2	2–0	1–0	0–0	1–0	1–1	3–1	0–1
King's Lynn Town	3–0	0–1	2–1	1–0	2–0	2–0	2–0	1–2	1–1	1–0	4–2	1–0	0–1	0–3		0–1	2–3	0–0	3–2	1–0	2–1	1–1	2–1	0–0
Leamington	0–0	2–1	0–1	1–2	1–0	2–2	2–0	3–0	1–0	2–0	2–1	0–1	0–0	3–2	1–1		1–0	2–0	1–0	0–1	3–0	2–2	1–0	0–0
Merthyr Town	2–2	3–0	1–2	2–1	1–2	2–0	0–1	2–4	1–3	1–1	3–0	5–1	4–1	1–1	2–0	0–2		1–1	1–1	2–1	2–0	1–1	3–0	1–3
Paulton Rovers	0–0	0–0	3–2	2–1	2–0	0–1	1–4	1–1	1–2	2–1	0–2	2–1	0–0	0–1	1–3	1–1	1–2		0–4	0–5	3–3	2–5	2–1	1–1
Poole Town	5–0	3–0	2–2	2–1	3–0	1–3	3–0	0–0	3–0	5–0	3–0	1–0	0–0	1–0	1–1	1–0	2–2	2–1		2–1	3–3	3–0	1–2	2–0
Redditch United	8–1	4–1	2–2	0–0	1–0	6–2	0–1	2–0	0–0	1–1	1–0	3–2	2–2	2–1	2–0	0–0	3–1	1–1	0–0		1–0	1–1	3–2	1–1
Slough Town	1–2	2–1	2–0	3–1	0–1	1–0	1–0	1–2	1–0	0–0	7–1	1–0	0–2	1–3	2–0	1–3	3–1	2–1	1–3	0–2		2–2	2–4	0–0
St Neots Town	2–2	3–1	2–0	1–1	2–4	0–4	1–2	1–0	1–0	2–2	1–1	1–2	0–2	0–1	0–1	1–0	1–2	1–0	2–3	1–3	0–0		2–2	1–1
Stratford Town	2–0	0–0	3–0	5–2	1–1	1–1	2–1	1–2	0–0	0–1	1–2	1–1	0–2	2–1	1–1	0–1	0–3	4–0	0–1	1–0	1–1	2–1		1–1
Weymouth	1–0	1–0	0–1	1–0	1–4	1–1	3–1	2–2	0–0	2–0	1–0	0–2	2–1	3–2	2–0	1–0	3–0	4–1	0–1	2–0	6–1	1–1	2–1	

Updated to match(es) played on 26 April 2016. Source: SFL Premier Division results grid
Legend: Blue = home team win; Yellow = draw; Red = away team win.

=== Stadia and locations ===
Locations of the Premier Division clubs

Club	Stadium	Capacity
Bedworth United	The Oval Ground	3,000
Bideford	The Sports Ground	2,000
Biggleswade Town	The Carlsberg Stadium	3,000
Cambridge City	Westwood Road (groundshare with St Ives Town)	2,000
Chesham United	The Meadow	5,000
Chippenham Town	Hardenhuish Park	2,815
Cirencester Town	Corinium Stadium	4,500
Dorchester Town	The Avenue Stadium	5,009
Dunstable Town	Creasey Park	3,200
Frome Town	Badgers Hill	2,000
Histon	Bridge Road	4,300
Hitchin Town	Top Field	4,000
Hungerford Town	Bulpit Lane	2,500
Kettering Town	Latimer Park (groundshare with Burton Park Wanderers)	2,400
King's Lynn Town	The Walks	5,733
Leamington	New Windmill Ground	3,000
Merthyr Town	Penydarren Park	10,000
Paulton Rovers	Athletic Field	2,500
Poole Town	Tatnam Ground	2,500
Redditch United	The Valley	5,000
Slough Town	Holloways Park (groundshare with Beaconsfield SYCOB)	3,500
St Neots Town	New Rowley Park	3,500
Stratford Town	DCS Stadium	1,400
Weymouth	Bob Lucas Stadium	6,600

== Division One Central ==
Division One Central consisted of 22 clubs, including 16 clubs from previous season and six new clubs:

- AFC Rushden & Diamonds, promoted from the United Counties League
- Arlesey Town, relegated from the Premier Division
- Fleet Town, transferred from Division One South & West
- Kings Langley, promoted from the Spartan South Midlands League
- Petersfield Town, promoted from the Wessex League
- Ware, transferred from Isthmian League Division One North

=== League table ===
Southern Football League Division One Central
- Season: 2015–16
- Champions: Kings Langley
- Promoted: Kings Langley; St Ives Town
- Relegated: Leighton Town; North Greenford United
- Matches: 462
- Goals: 1,404 (3.04 per match)
- Biggest home win: AFC Rushden & Diamonds 8 – 1 North Greenford United, 16 January 2016
- Biggest away win: Barton Rovers 1 – 8 Fleet Town, 16 February 2016
- Highest scoring: AFC Rushden & Diamonds 8 – 1 North Greenford United, 16 January 2016; Barton Rovers 1 – 8 Fleet Town, 16 February 2016
- Highest attendance: 545 – AFC Rushden & Diamonds 2 – 0 Bedford Town, 31 August 2015
- Lowest attendance: 51 – Arlesey Town 2 – 5 Beaconsfield Town, 22 August 2015
- Total attendance: 13,069
- Average attendance: 145

Pos	Team	Pld	W	D	L	GF	GA	GD	Pts	Promotion or relegation
1	Kings Langley	42	27	6	9	83	44	+39	87	Promoted to the Premier Division
2	Royston Town	42	25	8	9	99	46	+53	83	Qualified for the play-offs
3	Egham Town	42	26	5	11	80	39	+41	83	Qualified for the play-offs
4	St Ives Town	42	22	12	8	72	38	+34	78	Qualified for the play-offs, then promoted to the Premier Division
5	AFC Rushden & Diamonds	42	23	8	11	81	44	+37	77	Qualified for the play-offs, then transferred to Northern Premier League Division One South
6	Chalfont St Peter	42	23	2	17	76	71	+5	71	
7	Northwood	42	20	9	13	62	49	+13	69	
8	Aylesbury	42	20	8	14	72	52	+20	68	
9	Beaconsfield SYCOB	42	19	10	13	77	54	+23	67	
10	Godalming Town	42	19	10	13	51	45	+6	67	Transferred to Isthmian League Division One South
11	Ware	42	19	6	17	67	69	−2	63	Transferred to Isthmian League Division One North
12	Potters Bar Town	42	16	10	16	62	64	−2	58	
13	Petersfield Town	42	16	7	19	71	80	−9	55	
14	Bedford Town	42	12	13	17	57	60	−3	49	
15	Uxbridge	42	13	9	20	59	71	−12	48	
16	Arlesey Town	42	14	5	23	48	87	−39	47	
17	Fleet Town	42	12	9	21	55	78	−23	45	
18	Barton Rovers	42	9	15	18	51	75	−24	42	
19	Aylesbury United	42	11	7	24	45	81	−36	40	
20	Hanwell Town	42	10	9	23	38	64	−26	39	
21	Leighton Town	42	9	8	25	47	86	−39	35	Relegated to the Spartan South Midlands League
22	North Greenford United	42	6	6	30	51	107	−56	24	Relegated to the Combined Counties League

Source: fchd.com
Rules for classification: 1) points; 2) goal difference; 3) number of goals scored.

==== Top scorers ====
As of 25 April 2016

Player	Club	Goals
Anthony Mendy	Chalfont St Peter	31
Mitchell Weiss	Kings Langley	29
Kieran Bishop	Ware	23
Brendan Matthew	Egham Town	23
Aaron Berry	Beaconsfield SYCOB	21

==== Play-offs ====
Semifinals
2	Royston Town	1
5	AFC Rushden & Diamonds	2
3	Egham Town	2(2)
4	St Ives Town	2(4)

Final
4	St Ives Town	2
5	AFC Rushden & Diamonds	1

Semi-finals

26 April 2016	Egham Town	2–2 (a.e.t.) (2-4 p)	St Ives Town	The Runnymede, Egham
	Pashaj 8' Moore 52'		York 29' (o.g.) Seymour-Shove 54'	Attendance: 258

26 April 2016	Royston Town	1–2	AFC Rushden & Diamonds	Garden Walk, Royston
	Scott-Bridges 90+2'		Bowen 29' Dolman 80' (pen.)	Attendance: 655

Final

2 May 2016	St Ives Town	2–1 (a.e.t.)	AFC Rushden & Diamonds	Westwood Road, St Ives
	Watson 88' Seymour-Shove 97'		Sandy 81'	Attendance: 1,523

=== Results ===
Home \ Away	RUS	ARL	AYB	AYL	BAR	BEA	BED	CHA	EGH	FLE	GOD	HAN	KIL	LEI	NGU	NOR	PET	POT	ROY	STI	UXB	WAR
AFC Rushden & Diamonds		6–1	1–0	2–1	4–0	1–1	2–0	3–1	0–1	5–2	2–0	1–0	0–1	7–1	8–1	0–0	1–1	3–2	1–4	2–0	1–2	3–0
Arlesey Town	2–1		0–2	0–0	1–0	2–5	1–1	3–2	0–7	4–1	1–1	1–3	0–3	0–2	3–1	0–1	1–0	0–2	1–3	0–1	1–1	1–3
Aylesbury	2–4	3–0		2–2	3–1	3–1	2–1	2–0	1–0	3–3	2–0	2–2	0–3	0–0	3–1	0–0	4–0	4–4	2–3	0–2	2–1	6–0
Aylesbury United	0–4	1–0	0–1		0–0	1–2	1–5	0–4	0–3	0–1	1–2	1–1	1–4	2–1	3–0	1–1	2–6	1–0	0–4	2–4	2–2	0–3
Barton Rovers	1–3	1–2	0–3	2–2		1–1	1–1	0–1	0–1	1–8	0–0	0–1	0–2	2–0	3–1	0–3	2–2	2–2	2–2	1–1	2–2	4–1
Beaconsfield Town	4–0	3–1	2–1	3–0	1–1		2–2	2–0	1–2	3–0	0–2	3–1	2–0	0–2	5–0	4–1	5–0	3–0	0–2	1–1	2–1	1–1
Bedford Town	1–2	1–0	1–0	3–0	1–0	3–2		4–0	4–3	2–2	0–3	1–1	1–3	2–1	1–1	1–2	2–2	1–1	0–0	0–0	0–1	3–2
Chalfont St Peter	2–0	3–0	4–3	3–2	3–0	5–1	1–1		0–1	1–2	4–1	3–0	2–3	4–2	3–2	0–3	2–1	1–0	0–2	1–4	1–3	3–2
Egham Town	2–0	2–1	1–0	2–1	0–2	1–1	1–4	1–0		2–2	0–1	3–0	1–0	1–2	3–1	1–1	4–1	4–0	3–1	0–1	2–2	3–2
Fleet Town	0–0	1–2	0–1	2–1	0–2	1–1	1–1	2–1	2–1		2–1	0–1	0–0	4–2	2–1	1–3	3–2	0–1	1–2	0–2	2–0	1–1
Godalming Town	1–0	0–2	1–0	1–0	1–2	2–0	2–1	0–3	1–3	2–0		1–0	0–1	2–2	3–1	2–1	4–1	0–1	1–0	1–1	2–2	0–1
Hanwell Town	1–2	0–3	1–2	0–1	1–3	1–4	2–1	0–1	0–4	0–0	1–2		2–1	2–1	3–2	0–1	2–2	2–2	0–1	0–1	1–0	0–1
Kings Langley	1–1	1–2	2–0	1–0	6–1	1–3	3–1	3–1	2–1	2–0	1–1	3–3		2–1	2–0	2–0	2–0	4–1	4–4	1–1	3–1	4–2
Leighton Town	0–1	1–3	1–2	1–2	4–3	1–0	1–1	0–1	0–1	1–0	0–0	1–1	0–2		3–2	0–3	2–2	0–2	1–2	1–4	1–1	1–2
North Greenford United	1–3	3–1	2–3	2–4	0–0	0–0	3–1	6–2	1–2	2–4	2–1	0–3	1–3	2–1		0–1	1–2	1–1	1–1	1–6	1–1	0–2
Northwood	2–2	5–0	1–1	1–3	2–2	2–1	1–2	0–1	0–2	2–1	2–2	2–0	2–0	2–4	1–0		2–1	2–1	0–4	1–1	3–1	1–2
Petersfield Town	0–1	1–2	3–2	0–2	2–2	1–2	2–1	7–0	1–0	3–1	1–1	2–0	9–1	4–3	1–0	1–0		4–1	0–4	2–0	2–1	2–3
Potters Bar Town	1–0	2–2	1–0	1–2	2–1	4–0	1–0	1–1	0–1	3–0	1–2	1–1	3–1	0–1	2–1	1–2	3–1		3–1	0–1	3–1	3–3
Royston Town	1–0	4–1	0–2	4–1	1–1	2–2	3–1	1–2	1–1	4–0	0–1	2–0	2–1	6–0	7–1	1–2	2–3	4–1		2–0	1–1	3–1
St Ives Town	2–2	6–0	0–0	0–1	2–3	3–1	1–0	2–4	0–1	2–0	1–1	1–0	2–0	5–0	2–1	1–0	3–0	1–1	0–3		1–1	1–0
Uxbridge	0–1	4–0	2–3	1–0	0–1	0–2	2–0	0–2	0–7	4–2	0–1	1–0	0–2	3–0	2–1	0–3	3–4	4–1	3–1	2–4		3–1
Ware	1–1	0–1	1–0	2–1	2–1	1–0	1–0	1–3	2–1	6–1	2–1	0–1	1–2	1–1	3–4	2–0	3–1	1–2	1–4	1–1	2–0	

Updated to match(es) played on 23 April 2016. Source: SFL Division One Central results grid
Legend: Blue = home team win; Yellow = draw; Red = away team win.

=== Stadia and locations ===
Locations of Division One Central clubs
Greater London Division One Central Clubs

Club	Stadium	Capacity
AFC Rushden & Diamonds	Dog & Duck	2,500
Arlesey Town	Hitchin Road	2,920
Aylesbury	Haywood Way	1,300
Aylesbury United	The ASM Stadium (groundshare with Thame United)	2,000
Barton Rovers	Sharpenhoe Road	4,000
Beaconsfield SYCOB	Holloways Park	3,500
Bedford Town	The Eyrie	3,000
Chalfont St Peter	Mill Meadow	1,500
Egham Town	The Runnymede Stadium	5,565
Fleet Town	Calthorpe Park	2,000
Godalming Town	Weycourt	3,000
Hanwell Town	Reynolds Field	3,000
Kings Langley	CRY Community Stadium	1,963
Leighton Town	Bell Close	2,800
North Greenford United	Berkeley Fields	2,000
Northwood	Northwood Park	3,075
Petersfield Town	The Love Lane Stadium	3,000
Potters Bar Town	Parkfield	2,000
Royston Town	Garden Walk	5,000
St Ives Town	Westwood Road	2,000
Uxbridge	Honeycroft	3,770
Ware	Wodson Park	3,300

== Division One South & West ==
Division One South & West consisted of 22 clubs, including 17 clubs from previous season and five new clubs:

- Banbury United, relegated from the Premier Division
- Burnham, relegated from the Premier Division
- Marlow, transferred from Division One Central
- Slimbridge, promoted from the Western League
- Winchester City, promoted from the Wessex League

Flackwell Heath were initially promoted from the Hellenic League, but refused promotion after being switched from Division One Central to Division One South & West. Their place eventually went to Winchester City.

=== League table ===
Southern Football League Division One South and West
- Season: 2015–16
- Champions: Cinderford Town
- Promoted: Cinderford Town; Banbury United
- Relegated: Bashley; Burnham
- Matches: 462
- Goals: 1,481 (3.21 per match)
- Biggest home win: Taunton Town 11 – 0 Bashley, 22 March 2016
- Biggest away win: Bashley 1 – 10 Cinderford Town, 28 November 2015
- Highest scoring: Wimborne Town 5 – 6 Winchester City, 11 August 2015; Taunton Town 11 – 0 Bashley, 22 March 2016
- Highest attendance: 510 – Bridgwater Town 1 – 2 Taunton Town, 11 August 2015
- Lowest attendance: 54 – Wantage Town 9 – 0 Bashley, 18 August 2015
- Total attendance: 15,046
- Average attendance: 157

Pos	Team	Pld	W	D	L	GF	GA	GD	Pts	Promotion or relegation
1	Cinderford Town	42	29	9	4	80	29	+51	96	Promoted to the Premier Division
2	Banbury United	42	28	10	4	97	38	+59	94	Qualified for the play-offs, then promoted to the Premier Division
3	Taunton Town	42	27	8	7	94	34	+60	89	Qualified for the play-offs
4	Swindon Supermarine	42	27	6	9	81	42	+39	87	Qualified for the play-offs
5	Winchester City	42	24	11	7	97	49	+48	83	Qualified for the play-offs
6	Evesham United	42	24	9	9	92	38	+54	81	
7	Shortwood United	42	24	6	12	88	59	+29	78	
8	Tiverton Town	42	20	13	9	76	44	+32	73	
9	North Leigh	42	21	5	16	79	53	+26	68	
10	Didcot Town	42	18	10	14	82	57	+25	64	
11	Larkhall Athletic	42	15	10	17	62	65	−3	55	
12	Bishop's Cleeve	42	14	13	15	55	66	−11	55	
13	Marlow	42	15	7	20	68	79	−11	52	Transferred to Division One Central
14	Mangotsfield United	42	12	12	18	59	65	−6	48	
15	AFC Totton	42	14	6	22	73	81	−8	48	
16	Yate Town	42	12	11	19	48	62	−14	47	
17	Wimborne Town	42	12	8	22	65	80	−15	44	
18	Slimbridge	42	10	12	20	46	57	−11	42	
19	Bridgwater Town	42	9	7	26	42	83	−41	34	
20	Wantage Town	42	8	5	29	45	100	−55	29	
21	Burnham	42	6	6	30	39	99	−60	24	Relegated to the Hellenic League
22	Bashley	42	0	2	40	13	201	−188	2	Relegated to the Wessex League

Source: fchd.com
Rules for classification: 1) points; 2) goal difference; 3) number of goals scored.

==== Top scorers ====
As of 25 April 2016

Player	Club	Goals
Warren Bentley	Winchester City	44
Lewis Powell	Taunton Town	35
Adam Mann	Evesham United	30
Ethan Moore	Cinderford Town	29
Ricky Johnson	Banbury United	26

==== Play-offs ====
Semifinals
2	Banbury United	1
5	Winchester City	0
3	Taunton Town	2
4	Swindon Supermarine	1

Final
2	Banbury United	2
3	Taunton Town	0

Semi-finals

26 April 2016	Banbury United	1–0	Winchester City	Spencer Stadium, Banbury
	Barcelos 86'			Attendance: 596

26 April 2016	Taunton Town	2–1	Swindon Supermarine	The Viridor, Taunton
	Trowbridge 61' Powell 85'		Parsons 4'	Attendance: 506

Final

2 May 2016	Banbury United	2–0	Taunton Town	Spencer Stadium, Banbury
	MacEachran 24' Gunn 79'			Attendance: 1,228

=== Results ===
Home \ Away	TOT	BAN	BAS	BIS	BRI	BUR	CIN	DID	EVE	LAR	MAN	MAR	NOR	SHT	SLI	SWI	TAU	TIV	WAN	WIM	WCC	YAT
AFC Totton		0–4	4–0	7–0	2–0	0–1	1–2	1–3	2–2	2–1	0–1	2–2	2–1	0–2	2–0	1–5	0–2	2–2	2–2	1–2	2–0	2–1
Banbury United	3–0		8–0	1–1	2–1	1–0	0–1	2–1	0–0	5–0	3–1	2–1	3–1	2–1	3–1	0–3	2–0	0–0	8–1	2–0	2–1	2–0
Bashley	0–4	0–5		1–2	0–4	0–2	1–10	0–3	1–4	1–5	0–0	2–5	0–8	0–1	0–0	0–4	0–5	0–2	1–3	1–4	0–3	1–2
Bishop's Cleeve	0–0	0–2	6–0		1–0	1–1	0–2	5–0	2–1	1–1	1–1	2–2	2–0	2–1	0–1	0–1	1–1	1–1	2–0	2–2	1–1	3–1
Bridgwater Town	0–5	1–4	5–1	0–1		4–1	0–1	0–1	1–5	1–1	0–1	1–0	2–1	1–2	2–2	0–3	1–2	0–0	1–1	1–0	2–4	0–2
Burnham	1–5	0–5	5–1	1–2	0–1		2–3	1–2	0–5	0–4	1–1	2–3	0–1	1–2	0–2	0–2	1–3	0–0	2–1	1–3	1–4	0–3
Cinderford Town	3–0	3–3	6–0	3–1	1–0	2–0		1–1	3–1	1–0	1–0	4–3	2–1	1–1	1–0	4–1	2–0	3–2	4–1	0–0	2–2	1–0
Didcot Town	1–4	0–1	7–0	5–1	3–0	5–0	0–1		1–1	5–1	1–0	5–3	2–3	2–2	3–1	0–1	0–2	1–2	2–0	0–2	1–2	1–1
Evesham United	6–0	2–2	7–0	2–0	5–0	4–0	3–0	0–1		5–2	3–0	1–1	1–0	0–0	1–1	0–1	0–3	3–2	2–1	3–1	1–0	0–1
Larkhall Athletic	2–0	2–2	5–0	1–0	1–1	3–0	0–0	1–3	3–0		2–0	1–2	0–2	0–3	2–0	1–1	1–2	1–0	4–0	0–2	1–4	1–0
Mangotsfield United	1–1	0–1	5–0	3–2	5–1	0–3	0–2	3–2	1–4	1–2		0–0	0–2	0–0	1–1	1–0	1–3	3–4	1–1	3–1	2–2	1–1
Marlow	2–1	1–1	5–0	2–0	3–1	1–2	0–2	0–5	0–3	3–0	3–1		3–2	2–3	2–1	0–1	0–1	3–1	0–1	3–3	0–3	2–0
North Leigh	5–0	1–1	4–1	1–3	3–1	1–0	0–0	3–1	1–2	3–0	0–4	5–4		1–3	4–2	1–2	1–0	2–0	1–0	3–1	1–2	1–1
Shortwood United	5–3	0–0	6–0	2–0	3–2	5–3	2–0	1–3	3–2	3–1	4–1	1–2	0–2		2–0	1–5	1–2	0–1	5–2	4–1	1–1	3–2
Slimbridge	3–0	1–3	6–0	0–2	3–0	2–0	0–2	0–0	0–0	1–1	1–1	2–0	1–1	1–3		0–1	2–3	1–1	1–2	0–1	1–1	0–4
Swindon Supermarine	2–0	2–2	5–0	1–2	3–1	2–0	0–2	0–0	0–2	2–1	3–2	3–1	2–1	2–0	1–2		1–1	2–2	3–1	2–0	2–1	2–0
Taunton Town	3–2	7–1	11–0	3–0	0–0	2–2	0–0	1–1	0–1	1–2	3–0	3–0	2–1	1–2	4–1	0–0		1–0	5–0	2–1	2–1	3–1
Tiverton Town	2–1	0–1	9–0	1–1	1–1	2–2	2–1	5–1	2–3	0–0	1–3	2–0	2–1	4–1	1–0	2–1	1–0		4–0	2–1	1–1	4–0
Wantage Town	0–4	0–2	9–0	7–1	0–1	3–2	0–2	0–0	0–5	2–3	0–3	1–0	0–2	3–1	0–1	1–4	1–2	0–4		0–0	0–3	0–4
Wimborne Town	2–5	0–2	6–1	2–2	1–2	2–0	1–0	1–1	0–1	3–3	0–3	2–3	0–4	1–4	0–3	1–2	2–2	2–3	3–0		5–6	2–0
Winchester City	3–1	4–0	4–0	4–1	7–2	6–1	0–0	1–5	2–1	1–1	2–1	6–1	0–0	2–1	2–1	3–1	0–3	0–0	3–0	2–1		3–0
Yate Town	4–2	0–4	2–0	0–0	1–0	0–0	0–1	3–3	0–0	2–1	3–3	0–0	1–3	0–3	0–0	5–2	0–3	0–1	2–1	1–3	0–0	

Updated to match(es) played on 23 April 2016. Source: SFL Division One South & West results grid
Legend: Blue = home team win; Yellow = draw; Red = away team win.

=== Stadia and locations ===
Locations of Division One South & West clubs

Club	Stadium	Capacity
AFC Totton	Testwood Stadium	3,000
Banbury United	Spencer Stadium	2,000
Bashley	Bashley Road	2,000
Bishops Cleeve	Kayte Lane	1,500
Bridgwater Town	Fairfax Park	2,500
Burnham	The Gore	2,500
Cinderford Town	Causeway Ground	3,500
Didcot Town	Draycott Engineering Loop Meadow Stadium	3,000
Evesham United	Spiers and Hartwell Jubilee Stadium	3,000
Larkhall Athletic	The Plain Ham Ground	1,000
Mangotsfield United	Cossham Street	2,500
Marlow	Alfred Davis Memorial Ground	3,000
North Leigh	Eynsham Hall Park Sports Ground	2,000
Shortwood United	Meadowbank Ground	2,000
Slimbridge	Thornhill Park	1,500
Swindon Supermarine	Hunts Copse Ground	3,000
Taunton Town	The Viridor Stadium	2,500
Tiverton Town	Ladysmead	3,500
Wantage Town	Alfredian Park	1,500
Wimborne Town	The Cuthbury	3,250
Winchester City	The City Ground	4,500
Yate Town	Lodge Road	2,000

== League Cup ==
2015–16 Southern League Cup
Tournament details
- Country: England; Wales
- Teams: 68

Final positions
- Champions: Merthyr Town
- Runners-up: Cambridge City

The Southern League Cup 2015–16 (billed as the RedInsure Cup 2015–16 for sponsorship reasons) is the 78th season of the Southern League Cup, the cup competition of the Southern Football League.

=== Preliminary round ===
9 September 2015	Frome Town	1–1 (5–6 p)	Larkhall Athletic	Blindmans Brewery Stadium, Frome
19:45 BST (UTC+01)	Jeffries 60'		Griffiths 64'	Attendance: 102

7 September 2015	Hitchin Town	1–0	Aylesbury	Top Field, Hitchin
19:45 BST (UTC+01)	Lench 46'			Attendance: 112; Referee: P Forrester

=== 1st round ===
13 October 2015	AFC Rushden & Diamonds	1–4	Histon	Dog & Duck, Wellingborough
19:45 BST (UTC+01)	Lawless 83 Pen		Ives 1'; Meacher 4'; Oyinsan 73'; Douydas 90'	Attendance: 179

20 October 2015	AFC Totton	7–2	Bashley	Testwood Stadium, Totton
19:45 BST (UTC+01)	Lee 27', 41', 51'; Edwards 47'; Watts 52', 56', 60'		Lambert 11'; Squibb 30'	Attendance: 161

13 October 2015	Barton Rovers	1–3	King's Lynn Town	Sharpenhoe Road, Barton-le-Clay[
19:45 BST (UTC+01)	Davis 66'		Friend 16', 86'; Stevenson 90+1'	Attendance: 60

13 October 2015	Bedworth United	2–1	Evesham United	The Oval Ground, Bedworth
19:45 BST (UTC+01)	Wint 36', 64'		Mann 73'	Attendance: 102

13 October 2015	Biggleswade Town	3–2	Royston Town	Carlsberg Stadium, Biggleswade
19:45 BST (UTC+01)	Hill 34' (pen.); Bailey 43'; King 69'		Ingrey 8' (pen.); Fehmi 87'	Attendance: 99

13 October 2015	Chippenham Town	4–1	Larkhall Athletic	Hardenhuish Park, Chippenham
19:45 BST (UTC+01)	Diouf 34'; Ballinger 51' (pen.); Taylor 82'; McCormack 85'		Camm 68'	Attendance: 182

14 October 2015	Cinderford Town	3–3 (4–5 p)	Merthyr Town	Causeway Ground, Cinderford
19:45 BST (UTC+01)	Parker 10'; Smith 15'; Turkey 83'		Wright 5'; Scotcher 62'; Bowen 85'

13 October 2015	Cirencester Town	0–1	Hungerford Town	Corinium Stadium, Cirencester
19:45 BST (UTC+01)			Berry-Hargreaves 16'	Attendance: 88

13 October 2015	Dorchester Town	1–3	Poole Town	The Avenue Stadium, Dorchester
19:45 BST (UTC+01)	Davis 82' (pen.)		Holmes 10'; Stone 32'; Leonard 90+1'	Attendance: 270

13 October 2015	Dunstable Town	1–3	Cambridge City	Creasey Park Stadium, Dunstable
19:45 BST (UTC+01)	Osobu 34'		Reynolds 39'; Midgeley 88'; Serrano 90+1'	Attendance: 60

13 October 2015	Godalming Town	6–0	Burnham	Weycourt Stadium, Gosalming
19:45 BST (UTC+01)	Mazzone 9', 14', 38'; Purdy 29', 57'; W Hutton 41'			Attendance: 68

26 October 2015	Hitchin Town	3–2	Bedford Town	Top Field, Hitchin
19:45 BST (UTC+01)	Rolfe 23' (pen.); B Donnelly 60'; Ann 90+1'		Gittings 6'; Lincoln 40'	Attendance: 129

12 September 2015	Kings Langley	0–0 (1–3 p)	Chalfont St. Peter	Gaywood Park, Kings Langley
19:45 BST (UTC+01)				Attendance: 24

13 October 2015	Leamington	2–0	Bishop's Cleeve	New Windmill Ground, Whitnash
19:45 BST (UTC+01)	Ogleby 19'; Hood 71'			Attendance: 143

13 October 2015	Leighton Town	0–2	Arlesey Town	Bell Close, Leighton Buzzard
19:45 BST (UTC+01)			Abraham 66'; Tavernier 90'	Attendance: 90

13 October 2015	Marlow	2–1	Hanwell Town	Alfred Davis Memorial Ground, Marlow
19:45 BST (UTC+01)	Couch 20'; Downes 88'		Hind 79'	Attendance: 70

13 October 2015	North Greenford United	1–5	Beaconsfield SYCOB	Berkeley Fields, Greenford
19:45 BST (UTC+01)	Humaid 65'		Berry 46', 57'; Read 67', 70'; Patrick 86'	Attendance: 50

14 October 2015	North Leigh	4–1	Swindon Supermarine	Eynsham Hall Park Sports Ground, North Leigh
19:45 BST (UTC+01)	Osborne-Ricketts 37', 41', 58'; McNish 47'		Davidge 79'	Attendance: 35

13 October 2015	Paulton Rovers	2–1	Banbury United	Athletic Field, Winterfield Road, Paulton
19:45 BST (UTC+01)	Tooze 58'; Ricketts 83'		Howards 58'

14 October 2015	Petersfield Town	2–4	Winchester City	The Love Lane Stadium, Petersfield
19:45 BST (UTC+01)	Neal 10'; Briggs 44'		Norgate 2' (og.); Bentley 45'; Bosma 48'; Roberts 78'	Attendance: 76

13 October 2015	Potters Bar Town	3–0	Fleet Town	Parkfield, Potters Bar
19:45 BST (UTC+01)	Nelson 67'; Maja 69'; Fowler 87'			Attendance: 60

26 September 2015	Redditch United	1–1 (3–4 p)	Aylesbury United	The Valley, Redditch
19:45 BST (UTC+01)	Shearer 43'		Bewley 61'	Attendance: 14

10 October 2015	Shortwood United	0–1	Bridgwater Town	Meadowbank Ground, Nailsworth
19:45 BST (UTC+01)			Palmer 38'	Attendance: 56

14 October 2015	Slimbridge	3–3 (1–4 p)	Yate Town	Wisloe Road, Cambridge
19:45 BST (UTC+01)	Mace 23', 33'; Fahy 46'		Edwards 9'; Ingram 37', 90'	Attendance: 59

13 October 2015	Slough Town	3–0	Chesham United	Holloways Park, Beaconsfield,
19:45 BST (UTC+01)	S Harris 24'; Gokmen 39'; Strutton 80'			Attendance: 113

13 October 2015	St Neots Town	2–1	St Ives Town	Rowley Park, St Neots
19:45 BST (UTC+01)	Clarke 85'; Hawkins 90+3'		Cunniff 18'	Attendance: 174

27 October 2015	Stratford Town	3–3 (5-4 p)	Kettering Town	The DCS Stadium, Stratford upon Avon
19:45 BST (UTC+01)	Gregory 19 Fagan 28 Francis 82		Sandy 1 Baker-Richardson 36 Kinniburgh 84	Attendance: 132

13 October 2015	Tiverton Town	0–0 (0–3 p)	Taunton Town	Ladysmead, Tiverton
19:45 BST (UTC+01)				Attendance: 270

13 October 2015	Uxbridge	0–1	Egham Town	Honeycroft, West Drayton
19:45 BST (UTC+01)			Bassett 24'	Attendance: 60

20 October 2015	Wantage Town	4–1	Didcot Town	Alfredian Park, Wantage
19:45 BST (UTC+01)	Vattell 55'; Whitehead 60'; Roberts 62', 88'		Noble 40'	Attendance: 88

13 October 2015	Ware	2–2 (3–4 p)	Northwood	Wodson Park Ware
19:45 BST (UTC+01)	Karagul 34'; Davidson 84'		Murray 71'; Lomas 89'	Attendance: 53

13 October 2015	Wimborne Town	1–1 (1–4 p)	Weymouth	The Cuthbury, Wimborne
19:45 BST (UTC+01)	Wilson 76'		Sills 24'	Attendance: 144

=== 2nd round ===
2 December 2015	Aylesbury United	4–0	Wantage Town	The ASM Stadium, Meadow View Park, Aylesbury
19:45 BST (UTC+01)	Jones 23 Wood 28 Crook 32 Osborne 61			Attendance: 62

10 November 2015	AFC Totton	2–5	Winchester City	Testwood Stadium, Totton
19:45 BST (UTC+01)	Edwards 55 Knight 79		Bentley 9 Baskar 25 47 Fay 81 Roberts 87	Attendance: 155

10 November 2015	Biggleswade Town	1–1 (6–5 p)	Arlesey Town	Carlsberg Stadium, Biggleswade
19:45 BST (UTC+01)	Effiong 37		Farrell 30

10 November 2015	Bridgwater Town	1–4	Chippenham Town	Fairfax Park, Bridgwater
19:45 BST (UTC+01)	Fitzsimmons 82		Campbell 9 Jones 19 Holgate 85 Sandell 90+2	Attendance: 81

1 December 2015	Egham Town	1–2	Godalming Town	The Runnymede Stadium, Egham
19:45 BST (UTC+01)	Debattista 19		Bassett 25 54	Attendance: 54

9 November 2015	Hitchin Town	2–2 (4–2 p)	Stratford Town	Top Field, Hitchin
19:45 BST (UTC+01)	Kirkpatrick 8 Burns 84		Gregory 22 Sheldon 42	Attendance: 90

9 November 2015	Hungerford Town	4–4 (4–1 p)	North Leigh	Bulpit Lane, Hungerford
19:45 BST (UTC+01)	Goodger 54 Passey 60 Stow 70 Lynch 78		Osborne-Ricketts 2 Westlake 20 Else 26 Hopkins 34	Attendance: 81

10 November 2015	King's Lynn Town	2–2 (4–5 p)	Histon	The Walks, King's Lynn
19:45 BST (UTC+01)	Edge 28 32		Rumens 63 McGeorge 71	Attendance: 289

10 November 2015	Leamington	3–0	Bedworth United	New Windmill Ground, Whitnash
19:45 BST (UTC+01)	Willis 10og Ogleby 20 69			Attendance: 161

10 November 2015	Marlow	3–6	Slough Town	Alfred Davis Memorial Ground, Marlow
19:45 BST (UTC+01)	Mealing 43 Y Romeo 49 Welch 90+2		Hope 50 77 Gokmen 56 S Harris 81 90 Putman 84	Attendance: 148

10 November 2015	Northwood	5–1	Chalfont St. Peter	Northwood Park, Chestnut Avenue, Northwood
19:45 BST (UTC+01)	Murray 13 Muir 16 51 B Brown 64 Kennedy 90+4		Paine 23	Attendance: 55

24 November 2015	Paulton Rovers	2–0	Taunton Town	Athletic Field, Winterfield Road, Paulton
19:45 BST (UTC+01)	O Irish 16og Harris 89			Attendance: 88

10 November 2015	St Neots Town	2–2 (2–3 p)	Cambridge City	Rowley Park, St Neots
19:45 BST (UTC+01)	Hawkins 39 Hall 49		Kelly 41 Dawkin 68

24 November 2015	Potters Bar Town	4–2	Beaconsfield SYCOB	Parkfield, Potters Bar
19:45 BST (UTC+01)	Maja 22 59 Togwell 60og Delgado 85		Read 23 Berry 63	Attendance: 35

10 November 2015	Weymouth	2–1	Poole Town	Bob Lucas Stadium
19:45 BST (UTC+01)	Kelly 12 Molesley 60		Salama 10	Attendance: 315

10 November 2015	Yate Town	1–3	Merthyr Town	Lodge Road
19:45 BST (UTC+01)	Harvey 12		Jenkins 15 McLaggon 18 Bowen 38	Attendance: 104

=== 3rd round ===
3 February 2016	Aylesbury United	1–0	Leamington	The ASM Stadium, Meadow View Park
19:45 BST (UTC+01)	Taylor 83			Attendance: 113

13 January 2016	Cambridge City	1–0	Histon	ProEdge Westwood Road
19:45 BST (UTC+01)	Fehmi 41			Attendance: 123

10 February 2016	Godalming Town	0–2	Northwood	Weycourt
19:45 BST (UTC+01)			Hastings 23; Muir 72	Attendance: 66

25 January 2016	Hitchin Town	2–0	Biggleswade Town	Top Field
19:45 BST (UTC+01)	D Smith 22 og Palmiero 90			Attendance: 166

25 January 2016	Hungerford Town	0–2	Winchester City	Bulpit Lane
19:45 BST (UTC+01)			Bentley 64; Barron 88	Attendance: 118

12 January 2016	Merthyr Town	3–1	Chippenham Town	Penydarren Park
19:45 BST (UTC+01)	Morgan 19, 35; Jenkins 25		Snith 87	Attendance: 128

26 January 2016	Potters Bar Town	2–2 (3–1 p)	Slough Town	Parkfield
19:45 BST (UTC+01)	Grace 38; George 84		Barney 2, 41	Attendance: 54

12 January 2016	Weymouth	0–1	Paulton Rovers	Bob Lucas Stadium
19:45 BST (UTC+01)			Ford 50	Attendance: 157

=== Quarter-finals ===
10 February 2016	Aylesbury United	0–3	Potters Bar Town	The ASM Stadium, Meadow View Park
19:45 BST (UTC+01)			Nathaniel-George 33; Adcock 83; Maja 90+1	Attendance: 84

3 February 2016	Cambridge City	1–0	Hitchin Town	ProEdge Westwood Road
19:45 BST (UTC+01)	Harradine 55			Attendance: 133

2 February 2016	Merthyr Town	0–0 (5–3 p)	Paulton Rovers	Penydarren Park
19:45 BST (UTC+01)				Attendance: 201

2 March 2016	Winchester City	0–1	Northwood	The City Ground
19:45 BST (UTC+01)			Nicholas 26	Attendance: 89

=== Semi-finals ===
8 March 2016	Northwood	0–0 (2–4 p)	Merthyr Town	Northwood Park, Chestnut Avenue, Northwood
19:45 BST (UTC+01)				Attendance: 73

1 March 2016	Potters Bar Town	0–1	Cambridge City	Parkfield
19:45 BST (UTC+01)			Hall 48	Attendance: 92

=== Final ===
==== First leg ====
22 March 2016	Merthyr Town	5–1	Cambridge City	Penydarren Park
19:45 BST (UTC+01)	Prosser 17', 59', 90+4'; Hugh 71'; Traylor 73'		Harradine 46'

==== Second leg ====
6 April 2016	Cambridge City	0–2	Merthyr Town	ProEdge Westwood Road
19:45 BST (UTC+01)			Prosser 75', 82'

== See also ==
- Southern Football League
- 2015–16 Isthmian League
- 2015–16 Northern Premier League
