= 2025–26 Hellenic Football League =

Football league season

The 2025–26 Hellenic Football League season is the 73rd in the history of the Hellenic Football League, a football competition in England. The league operates two divisions, the Premier Division at step 5 and Division One at step 6 of the National League System.

The allocations for steps 5 and 6 this season were announced by The Football Association on 15 May 2025.

== Premier Division ==
Hellenic Football League Premier Division
- Season: 2025–26
- Champions: Slimbridge
- Promoted: Slimbridge
- Relegated: Cribbs; Lydney Town
- Matches: 380
- Goals: 1,220 (3.21 per match)

=== Team changes ===
To the Premier Division

Promoted from Division One

- Droitwich Spa

Promoted from the Western League Division One

- Hallen

Relegated from the Southern League Division One South

- Cinderford Town
- Cribbs

From the Premier Division

Promoted to the Southern League Division One South

- Hartpury University
- Sporting Club Inkberrow

Relegated to Division One

- Brimscombe & Thrupp
- Malmesbury Victoria

=== Premier Division table ===
Pos	Team	Pld	W	D	L	GF	GA	GD	Pts	Promotion, qualification or relegation
1	Slimbridge (C, P)	38	26	3	9	94	51	+43	81	Promotion to the Southern League Division One South
2	Roman Glass St George	38	24	5	9	86	51	+35	77	Qualification for the play-offs
3	Droitwich Spa	38	23	7	8	85	57	+28	76	Qualification for the play-offs
4	Cirencester Town	38	21	7	10	83	49	+34	70	Qualification for the play-offs
5	Worcester Raiders (O, P)	38	21	7	10	73	47	+26	70	Qualification for the play-offs
6	Corsham Town	38	19	7	12	64	52	+12	64	
7	Fairford Town	38	18	9	11	57	40	+17	63	
8	Cinderford Town	38	18	8	12	71	54	+17	62	
9	Hereford Pegasus	38	15	6	17	72	79	−7	51	
10	Tuffley Rovers	38	15	6	17	62	69	−7	51	
11	Longlevens	38	14	8	16	61	51	+10	50	
12	Highworth Town	38	13	8	17	49	51	−2	47	
13	Mangotsfield United	38	12	11	15	50	58	−8	47	
14	Westfields	38	13	6	19	51	75	−24	45	
15	Hallen	38	10	11	17	51	61	−10	41	
16	Royal Wootton Bassett Town	38	10	9	19	51	77	−26	39	
17	Thornbury Town	38	8	13	17	43	66	−23	37	
18	Pershore Town	38	9	8	21	38	68	−30	35	
19	Cribbs	38	6	12	20	41	73	−32	30	Reprieved from relegation
20	Lydney Town (R)	38	6	7	25	38	91	−53	25	Relegation to Division One

Source: The FA
Rules for classification: 1) points; 2) goal difference; 3) number of goals scored; 4) number of matches won; 5) head-to-head results
(C) Champions; (O) Play-off winners; (P) Promoted; (R) Relegated

=== Play-offs ===
Semi-finals
2	Roman Glass St George	1
5	Worcester Raiders	2
3	Droitwich Spa	1
4	Cirencester Town	0

Final
3	Droitwich Spa	1
5	Worcester Raiders	4

==== Semifinals ====
21 April 2026	Droitwich Spa	1–0	Cirencester Town	Droitwich Spa
19:45	Hurdman 81'	Report		Stadium: Briar Mill; Attendance: 512

22 April 2026	Roman Glass St George	1–2	Worcester Raiders	Almondsbury
19:45	90+5' (pen.)	Report	Taylor 6'; Stoddart 84'	Stadium: Gloucester Road; Attendance: 177

==== Final ====
2 May 2026	Droitwich Spa	1–4	Worcester Raiders	Droitwich Spa
15:00	Taylor-Randle 75'	Report	Murphy 21', 37', 61'; Monteith 66'	Stadium: Briar Mill; Attendance: 1,051

=== Results table ===
Home \ Away	CIN	CIR	COR	CRI	DRS	FAI	HAL	HEP	HIG	LON	LYD	MAN	PER	RGG	RWB	SLI	THO	TUF	WES	WRA
Cinderford Town	—	1–4	1–3	4–1	0–0	1–2	2–2	4–4	2–0	2–2	4–0	0–0	3–1	1–1	2–0	1–4	2–0	6–0	2–1	1–3
Cirencester Town	3–2	—	3–1	3–1	5–1	2–4	1–1	4–4	1–2	2–1	6–0	2–0	0–2	1–2	1–2	2–0	3–0	3–0	5–1	1–2
Corsham Town	0–2	2–2	—	2–1	3–3	1–0	1–1	2–1	1–0	2–0	3–0	1–1	1–0	2–2	1–0	3–2	3–0	1–0	2–4	1–1
Cribbs	2–1	3–4	0–2	—	1–1	1–0	1–1	1–2	1–2	3–3	5–0	0–1	0–1	0–2	1–2	2–3	1–1	1–1	0–0	0–6
Droitwich Spa	0–4	3–0	3–0	4–0	—	2–1	3–0	3–5	1–0	2–1	2–2	4–0	4–1	4–1	2–1	0–6	3–0	1–1	5–0	4–2
Fairford Town	2–1	1–3	0–1	2–0	2–3	—	0–0	2–1	1–1	0–0	2–2	2–0	1–1	2–1	2–0	1–1	2–0	1–1	0–2	0–0
Hallen	3–2	0–1	2–1	1–2	0–1	1–1	—	3–0	2–2	1–5	1–3	1–1	2–2	0–1	6–3	4–0	1–0	3–0	3–0	0–2
Hereford Pegasus	1–2	0–4	0–2	4–0	5–4	2–4	4–1	—	2–1	3–2	4–1	2–3	1–3	0–2	2–2	3–2	1–3	0–0	0–1	0–3
Highworth Town	0–2	2–3	3–2	0–0	0–0	0–1	3–0	1–2	—	2–0	1–1	0–0	1–1	2–0	1–0	1–4	1–2	3–2	4–0	2–1
Longlevens	0–1	0–1	4–2	1–1	0–1	0–1	3–0	1–2	1–0	—	5–1	1–0	4–2	3–2	6–2	1–0	1–2	0–1	0–0	3–1
Lydney Town	1–2	1–1	2–0	0–3	1–2	2–0	0–2	1–2	1–2	2–2	—	2–2	2–0	2–4	3–0	0–1	0–2	1–4	2–1	0–2
Mangotsfield United	2–3	1–3	2–2	2–3	0–1	2–0	1–0	2–2	1–0	0–1	3–1	—	0–2	3–2	2–2	2–7	1–1	2–1	4–0	0–1
Pershore Town	0–0	1–0	0–4	1–1	0–2	0–1	0–3	3–1	0–3	1–1	4–0	0–3	—	1–3	1–1	2–3	3–1	0–3	0–1	1–2
Roman Glass St George	4–1	3–0	1–2	2–0	3–1	0–4	4–3	1–2	3–1	2–1	5–0	2–0	3–0	—	2–1	3–1	5–1	2–1	3–0	0–0
Royal Wootton Bassett Town	2–1	1–1	2–1	3–1	2–2	0–4	0–0	2–2	2–4	1–1	3–0	0–2	1–0	2–4	—	0–3	3–1	1–2	3–0	0–2
Slimbridge	2–0	3–2	3–2	6–0	3–0	3–7	2–1	3–1	3–1	2–1	0–0	2–1	5–0	2–2	2–1	—	1–0	3–0	3–4	0–1
Thornbury Town	0–2	1–1	0–2	2–2	2–3	2–0	1–1	0–1	2–2	0–2	1–0	2–2	0–0	2–2	2–0	0–2	—	3–3	1–1	3–3
Tuffley Rovers	2–2	0–2	3–2	2–1	3–2	3–1	2–0	2–0	2–1	1–2	3–0	1–3	1–2	2–3	2–3	2–3	1–2	—	1–0	4–0
Westfields	1–2	0–3	1–2	1–1	1–5	0–2	3–0	2–5	2–1	1–0	4–3	3–0	3–1	0–2	1–1	0–3	2–2	7–2	—	3–0
Worcester Raiders	3–0	0–0	0–3	1–1	1–3	0–1	3–1	2–1	3–0	4–2	3–1	1–1	3–1	3–2	7–2	0–1	3–1	2–3	2–0	—

Source: The FA
Legend: Blue = home team win; Yellow = draw; Red = away team win.
For upcoming matches, an "a" indicates there is an article about the rivalry between the two participants.

=== Stadia and locations ===
Location of 2025–26 Hellenic League Premier Division clubs
Location of 2025–26 Hellenic League Premier Division clubs (Gloucestershire)

Team	Location	Stadium	Capacity
Cinderford Town	Cinderford	Causeway Ground	3,500
Cirencester Town	Cirencester	Corinium Stadium	4,500
Cribbs	Cribbs Causeway	The Lawns	1,000
Corsham Town	Corsham	Southbank	1,200
Droitwich Spa	Droitwich Spa	King George V Ground	2,000 (100 seated)
Fairford Town	Fairford	Cinder Lane	2,000
Hallen	Hallen	Hallen Centre	2,000
Hereford Pegasus	Hereford	Old School Lane	2,000
Highworth Town	Highworth	The Elms Recreation Ground	2,000
Longlevens	Gloucester	Saw Mills End	500
Lydney Town	Lydney	Lydney Recreation Ground	700
Mangotsfield United	Mangotsfield	Cossham Street	2,500
Pershore Town	Pershore	Community Stadium	4,000
Roman Glass St George	Almondsbury	Oaklands Park	2,000
Royal Wootton Bassett Town	Royal Wootton Bassett	New Gerard Buxton Sports Ground	2,000
Slimbridge	Slimbridge	Thornhill Park	1,500
Thornbury Town	Thornbury	Mundy Playing Fields	1,000
Tuffley Rovers	Tuffley	Glevum Park	1,000
Westfields	Hereford	allpay.park	2,000
Worcester Raiders	Worcester	Claines Lane	1,000

== Division One ==
Hellenic Football League Division One
- Season: 2025–26
- Champions: FC Stratford
- Promoted: FC Stratford
- Matches: 306
- Goals: 1,077 (3.52 per match)

=== Team changes ===
To Division One

Promoted from the Herefordshire League Premier Division

- Alcester Town

Promoted from the Northamptonshire Combination Premier Division

- Woodford United

Promoted from the Oxfordshire Senior League Premier Division

- Thame United reserves

Relegated from the Premier Division

- Brimscombe & Thrupp
- Malmesbury Victoria

From Division One

Promoted to the Premier Division

- Droitwich Spa

Promoted to the Combined Counties League Premier Division North

- Abingdon United

Resigned to the Gloucestershire County League

- Tytherington Rocks

Folded or withdrew

- Kidlington reserves
- Southam United

=== Division One table ===
Pos	Team	Pld	W	D	L	GF	GA	GD	Pts	Promotion, qualification or relegation
1	FC Stratford (C, P)	34	26	3	5	79	27	+52	81	Promotion to the United Counties League Premier Division South
2	Wantage Town	34	21	9	4	104	53	+51	72	Qualification for the play-offs
3	Bewdley Town	34	21	5	8	67	39	+28	68	Qualification for the play-offs
4	Stonehouse Town	34	19	8	7	81	39	+42	65	Qualification for the play-offs
5	Malmesbury Victoria (O, P)	34	17	9	8	67	48	+19	60	Qualification for the play-offs
6	Cheltenham Saracens	34	17	7	10	64	48	+16	58	
7	Brimscombe & Thrupp	34	15	6	13	59	50	+9	51	
8	Alcester Town	34	14	6	14	49	39	+10	48	
9	Newent Town	34	14	4	16	62	66	−4	46	
10	Redditch Borough	34	14	3	17	63	64	−1	45	
11	Ludlow	34	11	10	13	55	69	−14	43	
12	Shortwood United	34	12	6	16	54	57	−3	42	
13	Chipping Sodbury Town	34	12	6	16	47	55	−8	42	
14	Carterton	34	12	6	16	56	78	−22	42	
15	Woodford United	34	9	8	17	48	82	−34	35	Transferred to the Spartan South Midlands League Division One
16	Clanfield 85	34	7	6	21	38	75	−37	27	Reprieved from relegation
17	Wellington (Herefords) (R)	34	7	3	24	51	103	−52	24	Relegation to the Herefordshire League Division One
18	Thame United reserves (R)	34	3	5	26	33	85	−52	14	Relegation to the Oxfordshire Senior League Premier Division

Source: The FA
Rules for classification: 1) points; 2) goal difference; 3) number of goals scored; 4) number of matches won; 5) head-to-head results
(C) Champions; (O) Play-off winners; (P) Promoted; (R) Relegated

=== Play-offs ===
Semi-finals
2	Wantage Town	2
5	Malmesbury Victoria	4
3	Bewdley Town	1
4	Stonehouse Town	3

Final
4	Stonehouse Town	0
5	Malmesbury Victoria	1

==== Semifinals ====
21 April 2026	Wantage Town	2–4	Malmesbury Victoria	Wantage
19:45	Crook 59'; Cheetham 74'	Report	Muhid 40'; McGhee-Parsons 53', 77'; Roper 61'	Stadium: Alfredian Park; Attendance: 378

21 April 2026	Bewdley Town	1–3	Stonehouse Town	Bewdley
19:45	Bangay 85'	Report	Beadle 26'; Dare 90+2'; Mann 90+5'	Stadium: Ribbesford Meadows; Attendance: 281

==== Final ====
1 May 2026	Stonehouse Town	0–1	Malmesbury Victoria	Stonehouse
19:45		Report	Hughes 89' (pen.)	Stadium: Oldends Lane; Attendance: 704

=== Results table ===
Home \ Away	ALC	BEW	B&T	CAR	CHS	CST	CLA	STR	LUD	MAV	NEW	REB	SWD	STO	THM	WAN	WEL	WOO
Alcester Town	—	0–1	4–3	0–1	2–1	1–0	3–1	1–3	1–0	0–1	1–1	0–1	2–0	2–0	1–0	1–2	2–0	6–0
Bewdley Town	2–0	—	1–0	1–1	2–1	2–0	3–0	0–1	0–0	2–2	1–2	2–1	3–1	1–1	4–1	4–1	4–1	3–4
Brimscombe & Thrupp	1–0	0–3	—	6–1	1–0	3–2	2–2	1–2	1–2	0–0	2–1	0–0	0–3	1–1	2–1	3–1	5–1	4–1
Carterton	0–5	2–2	0–2	—	1–2	1–0	5–0	1–0	3–1	5–2	2–2	0–7	2–1	2–4	2–2	1–1	2–1	0–1
Cheltenham Saracens	2–1	4–0	2–2	1–0	—	2–3	1–1	1–0	3–2	1–1	4–1	2–0	4–2	2–1	2–2	0–2	4–0	2–1
Chipping Sodbury Town	3–1	0–2	2–1	2–3	0–0	—	1–1	0–0	0–1	1–0	0–3	4–0	3–1	1–2	1–0	1–1	3–0	2–2
Clanfield 85	3–2	1–3	0–4	1–2	1–2	3–3	—	0–2	2–3	2–3	0–4	3–1	1–1	0–2	1–0	1–3	1–4	0–2
FC Stratford	1–0	2–0	3–4	3–0	4–0	3–1	2–0	—	1–1	2–0	2–1	4–0	0–1	2–2	4–0	3–2	4–2	7–1
Ludlow	1–2	1–3	1–1	2–1	0–0	1–3	1–2	0–2	—	0–4	1–1	3–1	3–1	1–4	3–2	2–2	4–1	3–2
Malmesbury Victoria	1–1	2–1	3–0	5–1	1–0	1–3	2–3	1–2	2–2	—	4–1	3–2	3–1	2–1	1–1	2–2	1–2	4–1
Newent Town	1–1	1–4	2–0	7–2	3–1	3–1	3–2	0–2	1–2	1–2	—	1–2	0–1	0–4	2–0	2–4	2–0	2–0
Redditch Borough	0–1	0–2	0–3	3–4	1–3	2–0	2–1	1–2	7–1	1–4	3–0	—	2–2	3–0	4–1	3–3	3–2	2–0
Shortwood United	1–1	1–2	3–0	4–2	2–1	1–2	1–1	3–4	7–1	0–0	1–4	0–1	—	1–1	H/W	2–5	1–0	2–3
Stonehouse Town	0–2	3–1	3–0	3–1	1–1	3–1	3–0	1–2	3–2	1–1	2–0	2–0	3–0	—	4–1	2–2	4–0	4–0
Thame United reserves	2–1	0–1	0–2	2–0	2–3	2–3	0–3	1–0	0–0	0–2	4–5	2–5	0–4	1–4	—	0–1	3–4	1–5
Wantage Town	3–1	1–0	2–1	3–2	5–4	3–0	3–0	1–2	2–2	6–0	7–1	5–2	4–3	3–2	7–0	—	5–1	8–1
Wellington (Herefords)	2–2	3–5	3–2	0–4	4–5	4–1	0–1	0–4	1–5	0–3	1–4	2–3	0–2	2–9	3–1	2–2	—	2–2
Woodford United	1–1	1–2	0–2	2–2	0–4	2–0	2–0	0–4	3–3	2–4	3–0	2–0	0–1	1–1	1–1	2–2	0–3	—

Source: The FA
Legend: Blue = home team win; Yellow = draw; Red = away team win.
For upcoming matches, an "a" indicates there is an article about the rivalry between the two participants.

=== Stadiums and locations ===
Location of 2025–26 Hellenic League Division One clubs
Location of 2025–26 Hellenic League Division One clubs (Gloucestershire)

Team	Location	Stadium	Capacity
Alcester Town	Alcester	Stratford Road	
Bewdley Town	Bewdley	Ribbesford Meadows	1,000
Brimscombe & Thrupp	Brimscombe	The Meadow	1,000
Carterton	Carterton	Kilkenny Lane	1,500
Cheltenham Saracens	Cheltenham	Petersfield Park	1,000
Chipping Sodbury Town	Chipping Sodbury	The Ridings	1,000
Clanfield 85	Clanfield	Radcot Road	2,000
FC Stratford	Tiddington	Knights Lane	3,000
Ludlow	Ludlow	Ludlow Football Stadium	1,000
Malmesbury Victoria	Malmesbury	The Flying Monk Ground	1,000
Newent Town	Newent	Wildsmith Meadow	1,000
Redditch Borough	Redditch	The Cherry Tree Stadium	3,000
Shortwood United	Nailsworth	Meadowbank Ground	2,000
Stonehouse Town	Stonehouse	Oldends Lane	3,000
Thame United reserves	Thame	Meadow View Park	2,000
Wantage Town	Wantage	Alfredian Park	1,500
Wellington (Herefords)	Wellington	Wellington Playing Fields	
Woodford United	Woodford Halse	Byfield Road	3,000
