= FC Stratford =

Association football club in England

Coordinates: 52°11′38.94″N 1°40′34.90″W

- Full name: FC Stratford
- Nickname: The Bears
- Founded: 2007; 19 years ago
- Ground: Arden Garages Stadium, Knights Lane, Tiddington
- 2025–26: Hellenic League Division One, 1st of 18 (promoted)
Home colours	Away colours

FC Stratford is a football club based in Stratford upon Avon, Warwickshire, England. They were most recently members of the United Counties League Premier Division South and played at Knights Lane, groundsharing with Stratford Town.

== History ==
The club was founded in 2007 as Stratford Town A, joining the Midland Football Combination in 2009. In 2011, the club changed name to FC Stratford. FC Stratford entered the FA Vase for the first time in 2018–19. In November 2026 they withdrew from the United Counties League.

== Ground ==
The club groundshared with Stratford Town at Knights Lane in Tiddington.

== Honours ==
=== Midland Football Combination ===
- Challenge Urn Winners: 2010-11

=== Midland Football League ===
- President's Cup Runners-Up: 2018-19

=== Birmingham County FA ===
- Midweek Floodlit Challenge Cup Winners: 2022-23, 2023-24

=== Hellenic League ===
- Division One Champions: 2025-26
- Supplementary Challenge Cup Winners: 2023-24

== Records ==
- Best FA Vase performance: First Round, 2024-25, 2025-26
