= Ludlow F.C. =

Association football club in England

Coordinates: 52°22′50.45″N 2°43′54.03″W

Ludlow
- Full name: Ludlow Football Club
- Founded: 2017; 9 years ago
- Ground: Ludlow Football Stadium, Ludlow
- Manager: Eggy, Whooshy and Tonky
- League: Hellenic League Division One
- 2025–26: Hellenic League Division One, 11th of 18
Home colours

Ludlow Football Club is a football club based in Ludlow, England. They are currently members of the Hellenic League Division One and play at Ludlow Football Stadium, Ludlow.

== History ==
Ludlow were formed in 2017, following the demise of AFC Ludlow the previous year, joining the West Midlands (Regional) League Division Two. Ludlow remained in the league for three seasons, before joining the Shropshire County League. In 2024, the club was admitted into the Hellenic League Division One, after winning the Shropshire County League.

== Ground ==
Ludlow currently play at the Ludlow Football Stadium, opened in 2002 as a home for Ludlow Town.

=== Records ===
- FA Vase
  - Second round 2026-27
