= Longlevens A.F.C. =

Association football club in England

Coordinates: 51°51′53.161″N 2°12′34.463″W

Longlevens AFC
- Full name: Longlevens Association Football Club
- Nickname: Levens
- Founded: 1954
- Ground: Saw Mills End, Gloucester
- Chairman: Mark Cornell
- Manager: Peter Davies & Pete Boyle
- League: Hellenic League Premier Division
- 2025–26: Hellenic League Premier Division, 11th of 20
Home colours	Away colours

Longlevens Association Football Club is a football club based in the Longlevens suburb of Gloucester, Gloucestershire, England. They are currently members of the Hellenic League Premier Division and play at Saw Mills End.

== History ==
The club was established in 1954 and joined Division Four of the North Gloucestershire League. In 1968 they moved up to the Gloucestershire Northern Senior League. The club were Division One champions in 2008–09, and after a third-place finish in 2010–11 they were promoted to the Gloucestershire County League.

Longlevens were Gloucestershire County League champions in 2012–13. The following season saw them win the League Cup and retain the league title, resulting in promotion to Division One West of the Hellenic League. They went on to win Division One West in 2014–15, earning promotion to the Premier Division. In 2025–26 they won the league's Floodlit Cup, beating Hungerford Town reserves 4–1 in the final.

In September 2026, Longlevens AFC made history by becoming one of the first football clubs to win £1 million on the National Lottery with the winning ticket bought by club president Bill Davis – the winning numbers were 1, 9, 15, 21, 32 and 51.

== Honours ==
- Hellenic League
  - Division One West champions 2014–15
  - Floodlit Cup winners 2025–26
- Gloucestershire County League
  - Champions 2012–13, 2013–14
  - League Cup winners 2013–14
- Gloucestershire Northern Senior League
  - Division One champions 2008–09
- North Gloucestershire League
  - Division Four champions 1954–55

== Records ==
- Best FA Cup performance: Second qualifying round, 2021–22
- Best FA Vase performance: Third round, 2026–27
