= Redditch Borough F.C. =

Association football club in England

Redditch Borough
- Full name: Redditch Borough Football Club
- Nickname: The Borough (UTB)
- Founded: May 2006
- Ground: The Cherry Tree Stadium, Cherry Tree Walk, Batchley, Redditch, Worcestershire, B97 6PB
- Capacity: 3,000
- Chairman: Kim Workman
- Team Manager: Tyrone Henderson & John Edwards
- League: Hellenic League Division One
- 2025–26: Hellenic League Division One, 10th of 18
Home colours	Away colours

Redditch Borough F.C. is an English semi professional football club based in Redditch, Worcestershire.

The club has both male and female first teams both currently at Tier 6.

They are currently members of the Hellenic League Division One and the West Midland Regional Women's League Division One.

The club is a FA Charter Standard Club affiliated to the Worcestershire County Football Association.

== History ==
Redditch Borough Football Club was formed in May 2006 originally starting out as a junior football club with only an under 10's team managed by current first team manager Julian Workman.

The club applied for the club to join the Midland Football League in 2014 and was accepted into Division 3. The club finished 4th in its first season in the league and achieved promotion the following season to Division 2 after finishing as runners up.

The 2016–17 season saw the club enter the FA Vase for the first time, but they were beaten 5–2 by premier side Rocester F.C. The same season, the club finished 1st place in Division Two but eventually this was taken away from them due to a 3-point deduction as the club was found guilty of fielding an illegible player against Paget Rangers, so finished in fourth place. The club currently remains in Division Two.

== Ground ==
Since 2017, the club has been based at their home Redditch Borough Community Sports & Social Club, Cherry Tree Walk, Batchley, Redditch, Worcestershire.

== Honours ==
- Midland Football League Midland Football League Division Two Champions 2023-2024
  - Les James Challenge Cup Winners (1) 2018–19
  - Les James Challenge Cup Runners-Up 2016–2017
  - Midland Football League Division Three Runners-Up 2015–2016
  - Midland Football League Challenge Vase Winners 2015–16
  - Evesham Hospital Senior Cup Winners 2015–16
  - Evesham Hospital Senior Cup Winners 2016–17
  - Evesham Hospital Senior Cup Winners 2017–18
  - Smedley Crook Cup Runners-Up 2015-2016
