= Malmesbury Victoria F.C. =

Association football club in England

Coordinates: 51°35′23″N 2°06′09″W

Malmesbury Victoria
- Full name: Malmesbury Victoria Football Club
- Nickname: The Vics
- Founded: 1898
- Ground: The Flying Monk Ground, Malmesbury
- Chairman: Anton Evatt
- Manager: Sam Collier and Alan Griffin
- League: Hellenic League Premier Division
- 2025–26: Hellenic League Division One, 5th of 18 (promoted via play-offs)
- Website: https://www.the-vics.co.uk/
Home colours

Malmesbury Victoria Football Club is a football club based in Malmesbury, Wiltshire, England. Affiliated to the Wiltshire Football Association, they are currently members of the Hellenic League Premier Division and play at the Flying Monk Ground.

== History ==
The club was established in 1898 as Malmesbury Town. Although they folded in 1936, the club was reformed in 1947 and were later renamed Malmesbury United in 1968. In 1975 they merged with Swindon Victoria and were renamed Malmesbury Victoria, taking Swindon Victoria's place in Division One of the Wiltshire Combination. In 1976 the club were founder members of the new Wiltshire County League and were placed in Division One; they went on to finish as runners-up, missing out on the title on goal difference. In 1981–82 they finished bottom of Division One. The club won the league's Junior Cup in 1982–83 and the Wiltshire Junior Cup in 1986–87.

After finishing as runners-up in Division Two in 1993–94, Malmesbury were promoted to Division One. They were Division One runners-up the following season, but were relegated to Division Two in 1995–96. A third-place finish in Division Two in 1996–97 saw the club promoted back to Division One. In 1998 Division One became the Premier Division, with Malmesbury winning the league title in 1999–2000. The club them moved up to Division One West of the Hellenic League. In 2001–02 they won the Wiltshire Senior Cup, beating Pewsey Vale in the final.

In 2008–09 Malmesbury were Division One West runners-up and were promoted to the Premier Division. However, they were relegated back to Division One at the end of the following season as their Flying Monk Ground had not been upgraded to meet league criteria. They left the Hellenic League at the end of the 2013–14 season due to financial problems, returning to the Premier Division of the Wiltshire League.

Malmesbury were Premier Division champions in 2014–15, and after finishing third in 2015–16, the club were promoted to Division One of the Western League. They were transferred to Division One West of the Hellenic League prior to the 2018–19 season.

In 2023-24 the club finish runners-up in Division One West and promotion back to the Premier Division, however the team were immediately relegated the following season.

Season 2025-26 saw a remarkable climax with the club being promoted once more to the Premier Division via the Division One West Play-off’s when defeating Stonehouse Town F.C. in the final.

== Ground ==
The club played at several different grounds before moving to the Flying Monk Ground, which had previously been owned by the Flying Monk pub. Floodlights were installed in 2004.

== Honours ==
- Hellenic League
  - Division One playoff winners 2023–24
- Wiltshire League
  - Premier Division champions 1999–2000, 2014–15
  - Junior Cup winners 1982–83
- Wiltshire Senior Cup
  - Winners 2001–02
- Wiltshire Junior Cup
  - Winners 1986–87

== Records ==
- Best FA Vase performance: Third round, 1976–77
- Record attendance: 310, August 2009

== See also ==
- Malmesbury Victoria F.C. players
- Malmesbury Victoria F.C. managers
