= Wantage Town F.C. =

Association football club in England

Coordinates: 51°34′55.7″N 1°25′48.8″W

THE FREDS
- Full name: Wantage Town Football Club
- Nickname: The Freds
- Founded: 1892
- Ground: Alfredian Park (3G pitch), Wantage
- Capacity: 1,500
- Chairman: Lesley Furnival
- Manager: Daniel Barry
- League: Hellenic League Division One
- 2025–26: Hellenic League Division One, 2nd of 18
- Website: www.pitchero.com/clubs/wantagetownfc
Home colours	Away colours

Wantage Town Football Club is a football club based in Wantage, Oxfordshire that currently play in the Hellenic League Division One. The club is affiliated to the Berks & Bucks Football Association.

== History ==
The club was formed in 1892. The club started playing in the Swindon & District League, winning the Swindon Advertiser Cup in the 1903–04 and 1907–08 seasons, as well as also winning the league in the 1907–08 campaign. In 1909 they became one of the founder members of the North Berks Football League. After the First World War in the 1919–20 season, the club became joint winners of the North Berkshire league, with Abingdon Town and Long Wittenham. Two seasons later the club would go on to win the league again, but this time without having to share the honour. After winning the league title the club moved leagues and played in the Reading and District Football league, but after no success they went back to competing in the Swindon & District League, where they won the title in the 1933–34 season. After the Second World War the club continued to compete in the Swindon & District League, winning the league two times in the 1952–53, 1955–56 seasons. After their second league win the club joined the premier division of the Hellenic Football League.

They remained in the Premier division until the end of the 1963–64 competition, when finishing bottom they were relegated to Division one. The club regained promotion back to the Premier Division, when they finished as runners up in Division One at the end of the 1969–70 campaign. In the 1974–75 season the club made their debut in the FA Vase reaching the third round before being knocked out by Clanfield. The club was again relegated at the end of the 1975–76 campaign, and it took the club until the 1980–81 season to regain their Premiership status, when they finished champions of Division one. From the 1981–82 to 1993–94 season they remained in the Premier Division except for the 1987–88 and 1991–92 campaigns where they were promoted back up at the first attempt as Runners-up.

Despite finishing fourth at the end of the 1993–94 campaign, the club was demoted to Division one as a result of their ground failing to have floodlights. The club two seasons later finished as runners-up in Division one and subsequently erected floodlights to allow them to be promoted back to the premier Division. The club then remained in the premiership until the end of the 2002–03 season when upon finishing bottom were relegated to Division one east. The 2002–03 season also saw the club enter the FA Cup for the first time, when they met Gosport Borough in the preliminary round, but lost 2–1. The following season the club bounced back up as Champions.

The 2010–11 season saw the club become Hellenic league Premier Division champions, under the management of Andy Wallbridge. However the club were denied promotion to the Southern Football League as their ground did not have a boundary fence in place, that effectively prevents people who haven't paid for entry from being able to watch matches. In the 2012–2013 season, the club achieved the Southern League Ground grading, but finished runners-up to a very strong Marlow side, and again missed out on promotion.

In 2013–2014, the Freds won the uhlsport Hellenic Premier title again, and this time with the appropriate ground grading in place, saw promotion to Division One (South and West) of the Southern League. The Freds remained in the Southern League for three years, before seeing relegation back to the Hellenic League at the end of the 2016–17 season. In 2018–19, the Freds won the uhlsport Hellenic Premier title for the third time and regained their place in the Southern League, this time in the Division 1 Central section. The Reading Senior Cup was won for a further two times, in 2017-18 and 2018–19.

The following two seasons at the higher level were not completed due to the COVID-19 pandemic, but they finished bottom at the end of 2021-22 and were relegated back to the Hellenic.

== Ground ==
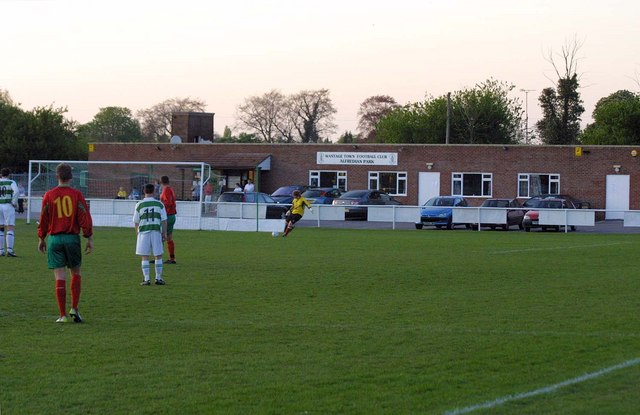
The Clubhouse at Alfredian Park

Wantage Town play their home games at Alfredian Park, Manor Road, Wantage. Floodlights were added in 1996.

Throughout the years the club has worked to upgrade the facilities at Alfredian Park. Purchased outright for the princely sum of £500 in 1922; floodlights were introduced in 1996 and new stands in 2012. The club merged with the junior section to become one entity in 2020, and re-introduced a Women's team in 2015, meaning football is now offered from U7s through to adults for players of both genders. The club has a long lease on St Mary's field behind the club, use of the adjacent school field, and another site at Tugwell to accommodate the growing number of teams. In the summer of 2025, development was completed for a 3G pitch, replacing the old grass pitch, along with new stands and dugouts.

== Honours ==
=== League honours ===
- Hellenic Football League Premier Division :
  - Winners (3): 2010–11, 2013–14, 2018–19
  - Runners-up (1): 2012–13
- Hellenic Football League Division One East:
  - Winners (1): 2003–04
- Hellenic Football League Division One:
  - Winners (1): 1980–81
  - Runners-up (4): 1969–70, 1987–88, 1991–92, 1995–96
- North Berks Football League Division One:
  - Winners (1): 1919–20, 1921–22
  - Runners-up (1): 1920–21
- Swindon and District League:
  - Winners (4): 1907–08, 1933–34, 1952–53, 1955–56

=== Cup honours ===
- Berks & Bucks FA Intermediate Cup:
  - Winners (1): 1954–55
- Hellenic Football League Division One Cup:
  - Winners (2): 1980–81, 1991–92
- Hellenic Football League Floodlit Cup:
  - Winners (1): 2006–07
  - Runners up (2): 2012–13, 2013–14
- North Berks Cup:
  - Winners (2): 1919–20, 1920–21
- Reading Senior Cup:
  - Winners (1): 1982–83
- Swindon Advertiser Cup:
  - Winners (2): 1903–04, 1907–08
- Hungerford Challenge Cup:
  - Winners (1): 1993–94
- Newbury Greystone Cup:
  - Winners (2): 1991–92, 1998–99
- Faringdon Thursday Cup:
  - Winners (1): 1958–59
- Faringdon Thursday Memorial Cup:
  - Winners (1): 1959–60
- Ian Humpries Memorial Cup:
  - Winners (3): 1991–92, 1992–93, 1993–94

== Records ==
- Highest League Position: 1st in Hellenic Premier Division 2010–11, 2013–14
- FA Cup best performance: Second qualifying round 2018–19
- FA Trophy best performance: First qualifying round 2016–17
- FA Vase best performance: Third round 1974–75, 1983–84, 1986–87, 2010–11, 2011–12
- Highest Attendance: 550 vs. Oxford United (August 2003)

== See also ==
- Wantage Town F.C. players
