= Slimbridge A.F.C. =

Association football club in England

Coordinates: 51°43′26″N 2°22′10″W

Slimbridge
- Full name: Slimbridge Association Football Club
- Nickname: Swans
- Founded: 1902
- Ground: Thornhill Park; Cambridge; Gloucestershire
- Capacity: 1,500
- Chairman: Barry Gay and Colin Gay
- Manager: Adam Coyle and Tom Deakin
- League: Southern League Division One South
- 2025–26: Hellenic League Premier Division, 1st of 20 (promoted)
Home colours	Away colours

Slimbridge Association Football Club is an English football club representing the village of Slimbridge, near Dursley, Gloucestershire (although its ground is in nearby Cambridge). The first team currently plays in the Southern League, the reserve team in the Hellenic League Division Two West, and the Under-18 Youth team in the Cheltenham Under-18 Floodlit Youth League. The club is affiliated to the Gloucestershire County FA.

== History ==
Slimbridge Football Club's history can be traced back to the 1899–1900 season when they played local football at various venues in and around the village, but as they do not appear to have played matches every season initially, the club officially dates its foundation to 1902.

In 1951 the club moved to their current ground at Wisloe Road (now Thornhill Park) after Evi Thornhill, a former player, bequeathed the land on which the ground stands to the club in his will. From then until the 1990s, the club mainly competed in the Stroud and District League, except for a spell in the Gloucestershire Northern Senior League in the 1960s. In the late 1980s, after a period of severe financial difficulties had been overcome, the club was finally able to upgrade its facilities and step up to the Gloucestershire County League, where they finished runners-up in their first season and were promoted to the Hellenic League Division One West.

The success continued with the Division One West title at the first attempt and with it promotion to the Premier Division, where three top-five finishes were achieved in the first three seasons, before the club clinched the championship in 2006–07. This earned promotion to the Southern League, but on 10 July 2007, the club made the following announcement on their website:

It is with the utmost regret that that Slimbridge AFC announce their resignation from the BGB Business Football League Division One – Midland Division, with immediate effect.
The decision was reached at a Club Committee Meeting yesterday evening (9th July 2007). In his statement the Club Chairman, Mr John Mack, cited a serious lack of loyalty, integrity and commitment from some members of the Club and he truly felt let down by that. This unfolding situation has cast severe doubts as to the ability of the Club to compete seriously at Step Four level. It is the reason behind the decision to withdraw.
It was confirmed that the Club will continue its membership of the Gloucestershire Northern Senior League.

As a result, the first team took the reserves' place in the Gloucestershire Northern Senior League. They won the league at the first attempt, and were promoted to the Gloucestershire County League where the club maintained back to back promotions by winning promotion back to the Hellenic League.

The club re-established itself in the Hellenic League Premier Division, and with Leon Sterling and assistant Fred Ward at the helm on the pitch, the club achieved sixth place (2010–11 season) and fifth place (2011–12 season) finishes upon their return to the top flight of the Hellenic League. In 2013 they transferred to the Western League Premier Division.

After the club secured a third-place finish in the Western League Premier Division at the end of the 2014-15 season, it was confirmed that they had earned promotion to the Southern League.

The 2025–26 season saw the club promoted back to the Southern League as Hellenic League Premier Division champions.The title was secured with a 3–2 comeback victory away to Tuffley Rovers on Easter Monday, with Slimbridge clinching the championship with two matches remaining. The result also secured the club's return to the Southern League after a three-year absence.

== Ground ==
The club's ground was formerly called Wisloe Road but changed its name on 26 July 2016 to Thornhill Park, in honours of former chairman Evi Thornhill, who gave the land to the club.

The record attendance at the ground is 886 for a game against Hereford in 2017. Average attendance is around 100.

The ground also plays host to the home games of Forest Green Rovers' women's team.

== Records ==
- Best FA Cup performance: Third qualifying round, 2006–07
- Best FA Trophy performance: Second qualifying round, 2020–21, 2021–22
- Best FA Vase performance: Fifth round, 2006–07

== Honours ==
- Hellenic League Premier Division
  - Champions 2006–07, 2025–26
- Gloucestershire Northern Senior League
  - Champions 2007–08
- Gloucestershire County League
  - Champions 2008–09
- Hellenic League West One
  - Champions 2002–03, 2009–10

== Sources ==
- Slimbridge at the Football Club History Database
- Slimbridge profile on the official Hellenic League website
