= Tiddington, Warwickshire =

Village in Warwickshire, England

Coordinates: 52.20°N 01.67°W

Tiddington
- Troilus, a row of cottages in School Lane, built about 1600

- Location within Warwickshire
- OS grid reference: SP2256
- Civil parish: Stratford-upon-Avon
- District: Stratford-on-Avon
- Shire county: Warwickshire
- Region: West Midlands
- Country: England
- Sovereign state: United Kingdom
- Post town: Stratford-upon-Avon
- Postcode district: CV37
- Police: Warwickshire
- Fire: Warwickshire
- Ambulance: West Midlands
- UK Parliament: Stratford-on-Avon

Tiddington is a village in Warwickshire, England, within the civil parish of Stratford-upon-Avon, about 1.5 miles (2 km) northeast of Stratford town centre. It is located south of the River Avon, and is connected to the historic town by Tiddington Road (B4086).

== History ==
There was a Roman settlement in a bend of the River Avon at Tiddington, almost 1 1/2 miles (2 km) north-east of the Roman road linking Salinae (Droitwich) and Alchester. Tiddington Road follows the main axis of the settlement. There were archaeological excavations in the area in 1923–27, 1937, 1939, 1981 and 1983.

== Amenities ==
Tiddington has a public house, the Crown. It has an Indian restaurant (Aladdins), a Chinese restaurant (Mr Chans) and a tapas/deli bar (Connollys). The Riverside Restaurant situated in the grounds of the caravan park is available for private function hire and public use. The Homeguard Club provides sporting activities. Stratford Town F.C. has its home ground in Knights Lane in the village, as do FC Stratford. It is also the home of Watford first team and England international goalkeeper Ben Foster.

Monroe Devis Maternity Home was a National Health Service hospital in Tiddington. It was opened in 1945 and closed in 1985. There was a geriatric psychiatric hospital in Tiddington until 2006, when the NHS merged it with the main hospital in Stratford-upon-Avon.

The X15 and X18 buses provide transport between Stratford and Coventry, whilst the nearest railway station is at also at Stratford.
