= Shortwood United F.C. =

Association football club in England

Coordinates: 51°41′31.89″N 2°14′22.02″W

Shortwood United
- Full name: Shortwood United Football Club
- Nickname: The Woods
- Founded: 1900
- Ground: Meadowbank Ground, Nailsworth
- Capacity: 2,000
- Chairman: Simon Grant
- Manager: Mike Finan
- League: Hellenic League Division One
- 2025–26: Hellenic League Division One, 12th of 18
| Home colours | Away colours |

Shortwood United Football Club is a football club based in Nailsworth, Gloucestershire, England. The club are currently members of the Hellenic League Division One and play at the Meadowbank Ground.

== History ==
Established in 1900, in Shortwood, Nailsworth. The club was promoted from the Stroud and District League to the Gloucestershire Northern Senior League in the early 1970s, before joining the Gloucestershire County League in 1975. After finishing as runners-up in 1979–80 and 1980–81, the club won the league in 1981–82 and were promoted to the Premier Division of the Hellenic League.

After finishing second bottom of the division in their first season in the league, the club were relegated to Division One. However, they returned to the Premier Division at the first attempt after finishing as Division One runners-up in the 1983–84 season. The club went on to win the Premier Division in their first season back in the division.

The club finished as runners-up the following season and again in 1989–90 before winning their second Premier Division title in 1991–92. Another second-place finish was achieved in 1993–94, but the club underwent several seasons of decline, finishing in the bottom half of the division every season but one between 1995 and 2006. However, finishing second in 2008–09, 2009–10 and 2011–12, the club were promoted to the Southern League in 2012.

The 2013–14 season saw the club reach the first round of the FA Cup for the first time in their history. After beating Football Conference club Aldershot Town away from home in the fourth qualifying round, Shortwood went on to play Port Vale in the first round in a game broadcast live on BT Sport. The 4–0 home defeat saw a new record attendance of 1,247 set. At the end of the 2017–18 season, the club resigned from the Southern League.

== Honours ==
- Hellenic League
  - Premier Division champions 1984–85, 1991–92
  - Division One Cup 1982–83
- Gloucestershire County League
  - Champions 1981–82
- Gloucestershire FA Trophy
  - Winners 1982–83, 1991–92, 2010–11

== Records ==
- Record attendance: 1,247 vs Port Vale, FA Cup first round, 11 November 2013
- FA Cup best performance: First round, 2013–14
- FA Vase best performance: Quarter-finals, 2011–12
