= 2007–08 Hellenic Football League =

The 2007–08 Hellenic Football League season was the 55th in the history of the Hellenic Football League, a football competition in England.

== Premier Division ==
Hellenic Football League Premier Division
- Season: 2007–08
- Champions: North Leigh
- Promoted: North Leigh
- Matches: 462
- Goals: 1,680 (3.64 per match)

Premier Division featured 18 clubs which competed in the division last season, along with four new clubs:

- Badshot Lea, promoted from Division One East
- Flackwell Heath, relegated from the Isthmian League
- Hook Norton, promoted from Division One West
- Lydney Town, promoted from Division One West

=== League table ===
Pos	Team	Pld	W	D	L	GF	GA	GD	Pts	Promotion or relegation
1	North Leigh	42	29	9	4	123	53	+70	96	Promoted to the Southern Football League
2	Almondsbury Town	42	29	9	4	98	30	+68	96	
3	Hungerford Town	42	28	8	6	118	47	+71	92	
4	Witney United	42	25	10	7	97	51	+46	85	
5	Shortwood United	42	23	8	11	93	50	+43	77	
6	Highworth Town	42	22	8	12	75	52	+23	74	
7	Milton United	42	19	10	13	75	67	+8	67	
8	Shrivenham	42	19	7	16	72	72	0	64	
9	Flackwell Heath	42	19	6	17	95	86	+9	63	
10	Lydney Town	42	19	6	17	71	71	0	63	Demoted to the Division One West
11	Badshot Lea	42	17	9	16	92	91	+1	60	Transferred to the Combined Counties League
12	Wantage Town	42	17	7	18	80	78	+2	58	
13	Ardley United	42	15	9	18	90	76	+14	54	
14	Hook Norton	42	14	12	16	55	74	−19	54	
15	Kidlington	42	14	11	17	86	73	+13	53	
16	Bicester Town	42	13	12	17	57	70	−13	51	
17	Pegasus Juniors	42	12	12	18	61	78	−17	45 (Note: Pegasus Juniors were deducted three points.)	
18	Carterton	42	11	9	22	59	93	−34	42	
19	Abingdon Town	42	11	8	23	65	87	−22	41	
20	Fairford Town	42	8	8	26	52	100	−48	32	
21	Harrow Hill	42	2	8	32	36	117	−81	14	
22	AFC Wallingford	42	2	2	38	30	164	−134	7 (Note: AFC Wallingford were deducted one point.)	Resigned to the North Berks League

Source: fchd
Rules for classification: 1) points; 2) goal difference; 3) number of goals scored.

== Division One East ==
Hellenic Football League Division One East
- Season: 2007–08
- Champions: Chalfont Wasps
- Promoted: Chalfont Wasps; Marlow United
- Matches: 272
- Goals: 949 (3.49 per match)

Division One East featured 15 clubs which competed in the division last season, along with two clubs:

- Ascot United, joined from the Reading Football League
- Thame United, relegated from the Premier Division

=== League table ===
Pos	Team	Pld	W	D	L	GF	GA	GD	Pts	Promotion or relegation
1	Chalfont Wasps	32	24	5	3	102	30	+72	77	Promoted to the Premier Division
2	Marlow United	32	21	7	4	65	29	+36	70	Promoted to the Premier Division
3	Englefield Green Rovers	32	19	4	9	61	39	+22	61	
4	Ascot United	32	18	4	10	73	46	+27	58	
5	Kintbury Rangers	32	18	3	11	71	48	+23	57	
6	Henley Town	32	17	6	9	57	39	+18	57	
7	Holyport	32	17	4	11	80	59	+21	55	
8	Bisley	32	17	4	11	75	55	+20	55	
9	Binfield	32	13	10	9	60	37	+23	48 (Note: Binfield were deducted one point.)	
10	Thame United	32	14	5	13	57	41	+16	47	
11	Penn & Tylers Green	32	12	7	13	40	40	0	43	
12	Wokingham & Emmbrook	32	12	4	16	43	58	−15	40	
13	Rayners Lane	32	9	8	15	45	69	−24	35	
14	Finchampstead	32	6	7	19	36	67	−31	25	
15	Chinnor	32	6	4	22	29	69	−40	22	
16	Prestwood	32	3	7	22	33	99	−66	16	
17	Eton Wick	32	0	3	29	22	124	−102	3	

Source: fchd
Rules for classification: 1) points; 2) goal difference; 3) number of goals scored.

== Division One West ==
Hellenic Football League Division One West
- Season: 2007–08
- Champions: Winterbourne United
- Promoted: Old Woodstock Town
- Matches: 306
- Goals: 1,085 (3.55 per match)

Division One West featured 15 clubs which competed in the division last season, along with three new clubs:

- Headington Amateurs, transferred from Division One East
- Launton Sports, joined from the Oxfordshire Senior League
- Oxford Quarry Nomads, transferred from Division One East and changed name to Oxford City Nomads

=== League table ===
Pos	Team	Pld	W	D	L	GF	GA	GD	Pts	Promotion or relegation
1	Winterbourne United	34	22	5	7	90	36	+54	71	
2	Old Woodstock Town	34	21	4	9	77	36	+41	67	Promoted to the Premier Division
3	Letcombe	34	20	5	9	83	41	+42	65	
4	Trowbridge Town	34	20	5	9	76	46	+30	65	
5	Cheltenham Saracens	34	18	9	7	89	33	+56	63	
6	Easington Sports	34	17	7	10	74	40	+34	58	
7	Pewsey Vale	34	17	7	10	51	36	+15	58	
8	Tytherington Rocks	34	15	11	8	70	38	+32	56	
9	Oxford City Nomads	34	16	6	12	66	49	+17	54	
10	Cricklade Town	34	16	6	12	63	56	+7	54	
11	Purton	34	14	2	18	55	78	−23	44	
12	Clanfield	34	12	5	17	66	79	−13	41	
13	Launton Sports	34	12	4	18	49	79	−30	40	Transferred to Division One East
14	Headington Amateurs	34	10	8	16	50	63	−13	38	
15	Wootton Bassett Town	34	11	3	20	43	66	−23	36	
16	Malmesbury Victoria	34	9	9	16	35	62	−27	36	
17	Banbury United reserves	34	4	3	27	32	119	−87	15	Resigned from the league
18	Cirencester United	34	2	1	31	16	128	−112	7	

Source: fchd
Rules for classification: 1) points; 2) goal difference; 3) number of goals scored.
