= 2006–07 Hellenic Football League =

The 2006–07 Hellenic Football League season was the 54th in the history of the Hellenic Football League, a football competition in England.

== Premier Division ==
Hellenic Football League Premier Division
- Season: 2006–07
- Champions: Slimbridge
- Promoted: Slimbridge
- Relegated: Thame United
- Matches: 380
- Goals: 1,222 (3.22 per match)

The Premier Division featured 17 clubs which had competed in the division's previous season, along with five new clubs:

- AFC Wallingford, promoted from the Combined Counties League Division One
- Bicester Town, promoted from Division One East
- Harrow Hill, promoted from Division One West
- Hounslow Borough, promoted from Division One East
- Thame United, relegated from the Southern Football League

=== League table ===
| Pos | Team | Pld | W | D | L | GF | GA | GD | Pts | Promotion or relegation |
|---|---|---|---|---|---|---|---|---|---|---|
| 1 | Slimbridge | 38 | 27 | 7 | 4 | 93 | 29 | +64 | 88 | Promoted to the Southern Football League |
| 2 | North Leigh | 38 | 25 | 10 | 3 | 77 | 33 | +44 | 85 | |
| 3 | Hungerford Town | 38 | 21 | 8 | 9 | 77 | 40 | +37 | 71 | |
| 4 | Ardley United | 38 | 19 | 10 | 9 | 78 | 54 | +24 | 67 | |
| 5 | Almondsbury Town | 38 | 19 | 9 | 10 | 73 | 44 | +29 | 66 | |
| 6 | Witney United | 38 | 16 | 13 | 9 | 67 | 49 | +18 | 61 | |
| 7 | Milton United | 38 | 18 | 6 | 14 | 73 | 70 | +3 | 60 | |
| 8 | Shortwood United | 38 | 15 | 9 | 14 | 76 | 72 | +4 | 54 | |
| 9 | Kidlington | 38 | 14 | 11 | 13 | 47 | 52 | −5 | 53 | |
| 10 | Shrivenham | 38 | 16 | 8 | 14 | 67 | 59 | +8 | 52 (Note: Shrivenham were deducted four points.) | |
| 11 | Wantage Town | 38 | 13 | 11 | 14 | 62 | 60 | +2 | 50 | |
| 12 | Carterton | 38 | 13 | 9 | 16 | 58 | 61 | −3 | 48 | |
| 13 | Fairford Town | 38 | 12 | 10 | 16 | 56 | 61 | −5 | 46 | |
| 14 | Bicester Town | 38 | 10 | 15 | 13 | 59 | 64 | −5 | 45 | |
| 15 | Highworth Town | 38 | 10 | 14 | 14 | 54 | 55 | −1 | 44 | |
| 16 | AFC Wallingford | 38 | 10 | 8 | 20 | 37 | 71 | −34 | 38 | |
| 17 | Pegasus Juniors | 38 | 9 | 7 | 22 | 45 | 85 | −40 | 34 | |
| 18 | Abingdon Town | 38 | 6 | 12 | 20 | 42 | 80 | −38 | 30 | |
| 19 | Harrow Hill | 38 | 5 | 9 | 24 | 36 | 82 | −46 | 24 | |
| 20 | Thame United | 38 | 6 | 6 | 26 | 45 | 101 | −56 | 24 | Relegated to the Division One East |
| 21 | Chipping Norton Town | 0 | 0 | 0 | 0 | 0 | 0 | 0 | 0 | Resigned from the league, record expunged |
| 22 | Hounslow Borough | 0 | 0 | 0 | 0 | 0 | 0 | 0 | 0 | Club folded, record expunged |

Source: fchd
Rules for classification: 1) points; 2) goal difference; 3) number of goals scored.

== Division One East ==
Hellenic Football League Division One East
- Season: 2006–07
- Champions: Bisley
- Promoted: Badshot Lea
- Matches: 306
- Goals: 1,150 (3.76 per match)

Division One East featured 15 clubs which competed in the division last season, along with three new clubs:

- Headington Amateurs, transferred from Division One West
- Henley Town, relegated from the Premier Division
- Marlow United, joined from the Reading Football League

=== League table ===
| Pos | Team | Pld | W | D | L | GF | GA | GD | Pts | Promotion or relegation |
|---|---|---|---|---|---|---|---|---|---|---|
| 1 | Bisley | 34 | 27 | 5 | 2 | 121 | 22 | +99 | 86 | |
| 2 | Chalfont Wasps | 34 | 25 | 2 | 7 | 96 | 37 | +59 | 77 | |
| 3 | Badshot Lea | 34 | 24 | 4 | 6 | 98 | 37 | +61 | 76 | Promoted to the Premier Division |
| 4 | Kintbury Rangers | 34 | 24 | 3 | 7 | 92 | 38 | +54 | 75 | |
| 5 | Rayners Lane | 34 | 19 | 8 | 7 | 86 | 46 | +40 | 65 | |
| 6 | Englefield Green Rovers | 34 | 16 | 6 | 12 | 53 | 52 | +1 | 54 | |
| 7 | Marlow United | 34 | 15 | 6 | 13 | 65 | 52 | +13 | 51 | |
| 8 | Wokingham & Emmbrook | 34 | 15 | 4 | 15 | 49 | 73 | −24 | 49 | |
| 9 | Holyport | 34 | 15 | 3 | 16 | 65 | 64 | +1 | 48 | |
| 10 | Headington Amateurs | 34 | 11 | 9 | 14 | 57 | 62 | −5 | 42 | Transferred to Division One West |
| 11 | Binfield | 34 | 12 | 5 | 17 | 52 | 57 | −5 | 41 | |
| 12 | Oxford Quarry Nomads | 34 | 13 | 2 | 19 | 64 | 79 | −15 | 41 | Transferred to Division One West |
| 13 | Penn & Tylers Green | 34 | 11 | 7 | 16 | 65 | 73 | −8 | 40 | |
| 14 | Finchampstead | 34 | 11 | 7 | 16 | 51 | 65 | −14 | 40 | |
| 15 | Chinnor | 34 | 9 | 9 | 16 | 45 | 58 | −13 | 36 | |
| 16 | Henley Town | 34 | 9 | 4 | 21 | 43 | 80 | −37 | 31 | |
| 17 | Prestwood | 34 | 5 | 3 | 26 | 25 | 87 | −62 | 18 | |
| 18 | Eton Wick | 34 | 1 | 1 | 32 | 23 | 168 | −145 | 4 | |

Source: fchd
Rules for classification: 1) points; 2) goal difference; 3) number of goals scored.

== Division One West ==
Hellenic Football League Division One West
- Season: 2006–07
- Champions: Lydney Town
- Promoted: Lydney Town; Hook Norton
- Matches: 306
- Goals: 1,040 (3.4 per match)

Division One West featured 16 clubs which competed in the division last season, along with two new clubs:

- Banbury United reserves, transferred from Division One East
- Lydney Town, joined from the Gloucestershire County League

=== League table ===
| Pos | Team | Pld | W | D | L | GF | GA | GD | Pts | Promotion or relegation |
|---|---|---|---|---|---|---|---|---|---|---|
| 1 | Lydney Town | 34 | 24 | 6 | 4 | 72 | 29 | +43 | 78 | Promoted to the Premier Division |
| 2 | Trowbridge Town | 34 | 21 | 7 | 6 | 76 | 31 | +45 | 70 | |
| 3 | Hook Norton | 34 | 20 | 6 | 8 | 62 | 42 | +20 | 66 | Promoted to the Premier Division |
| 4 | Malmesbury Victoria | 34 | 16 | 11 | 7 | 62 | 38 | +24 | 59 | |
| 5 | Tytherington Rocks | 34 | 15 | 10 | 9 | 71 | 48 | +23 | 55 | |
| 6 | Cheltenham Saracens | 34 | 14 | 10 | 10 | 57 | 45 | +12 | 52 | |
| 7 | Old Woodstock Town | 34 | 12 | 13 | 9 | 58 | 54 | +4 | 49 | |
| 8 | Cricklade Town | 34 | 15 | 4 | 15 | 51 | 56 | −5 | 49 | |
| 9 | Pewsey Vale | 34 | 12 | 12 | 10 | 47 | 46 | +1 | 48 | |
| 10 | Winterbourne United | 34 | 12 | 11 | 11 | 64 | 59 | +5 | 47 | |
| 11 | Wootton Bassett Town | 34 | 14 | 5 | 15 | 64 | 62 | +2 | 47 | |
| 12 | Cirencester United | 34 | 13 | 8 | 13 | 56 | 58 | −2 | 47 | |
| 13 | Easington Sports | 34 | 12 | 9 | 13 | 72 | 74 | −2 | 45 | |
| 14 | Banbury United reserves | 34 | 11 | 6 | 17 | 55 | 62 | −7 | 39 | |
| 15 | Letcombe | 34 | 11 | 6 | 17 | 54 | 63 | −9 | 39 | |
| 16 | Purton | 34 | 6 | 10 | 18 | 50 | 79 | −29 | 28 | |
| 17 | Clanfield | 34 | 4 | 7 | 23 | 32 | 70 | −38 | 19 | |
| 18 | Ross Town | 34 | 1 | 5 | 28 | 36 | 123 | −87 | 8 | Resigned to the Herefordshire Football League |

Source: fchd
Rules for classification: 1) points; 2) goal difference; 3) number of goals scored.
