= 2009–10 Hellenic Football League =

The 2009–10 Hellenic Football League season was the 57th in the history of the Hellenic Football League, a football competition in England.

== Premier Division ==
Hellenic Football League Premier Division
- Season: 2009–10
- Champions: Almondsbury Town
- Promoted: Almondsbury Town
- Relegated: Bicester Town; Hook Norton
- Matches: 462
- Goals: 1,673 (3.62 per match)

Premier Division featured 18 clubs which competed in the division last season, along with four new clubs:

- Ascot United, promoted from Division One East
- Binfield, promoted from Division One East
- Malmesbury Victoria, promoted from Division One West
- Oxford City Nomads, promoted from Division One West

=== League table ===
Pos	Team	Pld	W	D	L	GF	GA	GD	Pts	Promotion or relegation
1	Almondsbury Town	42	30	9	3	111	38	+73	99	Promoted to the Southern Football League
2	Shortwood United	42	30	5	7	107	46	+61	95	
3	Reading Town	42	27	9	6	95	27	+68	90	
4	Flackwell Heath	42	26	6	10	90	52	+38	84	
5	Wantage Town	42	24	11	7	92	52	+40	83	
6	Witney United	42	23	9	10	92	43	+49	78	
7	Ardley United	42	24	4	14	96	60	+36	76	
8	Binfield	42	22	7	13	88	70	+18	73	
9	Highworth Town	42	22	5	15	93	56	+37	71	
10	Oxford City Nomads	42	21	10	11	100	62	+38	70 (Note: Oxford City Nomads were deducted three points.)	
11	Kidlington	42	18	9	15	91	74	+17	63	
12	Abingdon Town	42	17	8	17	67	58	+9	59	
13	Old Woodstock Town	42	15	7	20	59	77	−18	51 (Note: Old Woodstock Town were deducted one point.)	
14	Pegasus Juniors	42	13	11	18	69	78	−9	50	
15	Ascot United	42	13	7	22	66	94	−28	46	
16	Shrivenham	42	9	11	22	53	86	−33	38	
17	Carterton	42	8	11	23	61	89	−28	35	
18	Marlow United	42	9	8	25	55	120	−65	35	Resigned to the Reading Football League
19	Malmesbury Victoria	42	8	9	25	48	108	−60	33	Demoted to the Division One West
20	Fairford Town	42	6	11	25	47	95	−48	29	
21	Bicester Town	42	5	5	32	56	134	−78	20	Relegated to Division One West
22	Hook Norton	42	3	6	33	37	154	−117	15	Relegated to Division One West

Source: fchd
Rules for classification: 1) points; 2) goal difference; 3) number of goals scored.

== Division One East ==
Hellenic Football League Division One East
- Season: 2009–10
- Champions: Thame United
- Promoted: Thame United; Wokingham & Emmbrook
- Matches: 272
- Goals: 943 (3.47 per match)

Division One East featured 14 clubs which competed in the division last season, along with four clubs:

- Chalfont Wasps, demoted from the Premier Division
- Didcot Town reserves
- Milton United, relegated from the Premier Division
- Woodley Town, joined from the Reading Football League

Also, Bisley changed name to Farnborough reserves.

=== League table ===
Pos	Team	Pld	W	D	L	GF	GA	GD	Pts	Promotion or relegation
1	Thame United	32	24	5	3	72	25	+47	77	Promoted to the Premier Division
2	Wokingham & Emmbrook	32	21	8	3	77	29	+48	71	Promoted to the Premier Division
3	Holyport	32	18	4	10	80	52	+28	58	
4	Woodley Town	32	16	9	7	74	41	+33	57	
5	Henley Town	32	16	8	8	58	33	+25	56	
6	South Kilburn	32	16	6	10	43	42	+1	54	
7	Milton United	32	14	7	11	54	54	0	49	
8	Finchampstead	32	11	11	10	50	51	−1	44	
9	Chalfont Wasps	32	12	6	14	61	76	−15	42	
10	Chinnor	32	10	9	13	49	62	−13	39	
11	Farnborough reserves	32	10	7	15	55	57	−2	37	
12	Rayners Lane	32	8	10	14	55	62	−7	34	
13	Kintbury Rangers	32	10	2	20	49	81	−32	32	Resigned to the North Berks League
14	Eton Wick	32	9	4	19	47	62	−15	31	Resigned to the East Berkshire League
15	Didcot Town reserves	32	9	4	19	48	73	−25	31	
16	Newbury	32	7	5	20	36	72	−36	26	
17	Penn & Tylers Green	32	4	9	19	35	71	−36	21	
18	Prestwood	0	0	0	0	0	0	0	0	Resigned to the Wycombe & District League, record expunged

Source: fchd
Rules for classification: 1) points; 2) goal difference; 3) number of goals scored.

== Division One West ==
Hellenic Football League Division One West
- Season: 2009–10
- Champions: Slimbridge
- Promoted: Slimbridge; Wootton Bassett Town
- Matches: 240
- Goals: 906 (3.78 per match)

Division One West featured 13 clubs which competed in the division last season, along with four new clubs:

- Harrow Hill, relegated from the Premier Division
- Launton Sports, transferred from Division One East
- North Leigh reserves
- Slimbridge, joined from the Gloucestershire County League

=== League table ===
Pos	Team	Pld	W	D	L	GF	GA	GD	Pts	Promotion or relegation
1	Slimbridge	30	20	7	3	75	20	+55	67	Promoted to the Premier Division
2	Wootton Bassett Town	30	20	7	3	74	34	+40	67	Promoted to the Premier Division
3	Headington Amateurs	30	20	4	6	78	42	+36	64	
4	Cheltenham Saracens	30	16	8	6	84	40	+44	56	
5	Purton	30	16	7	7	81	49	+32	55	
6	Easington Sports	30	18	0	12	50	43	+7	54	
7	Letcombe	30	15	5	10	63	48	+15	50	
8	Lydney Town	30	14	4	12	55	48	+7	46	
9	Cricklade Town	30	13	3	14	64	53	+11	42	
10	Clanfield	30	11	4	15	45	57	−12	37	
11	Tytherington Rocks	30	9	7	14	43	49	−6	34	
12	North Leigh reserves	30	9	7	14	42	59	−17	34	Resigned from the league
13	Winterbourne United	30	9	2	19	60	61	−1	29	
14	Trowbridge Town	30	6	8	16	43	62	−19	26	
15	Launton Sports	30	4	1	25	25	114	−89	13	
16	Cirencester United	30	1	4	25	24	127	−103	7	Club folded
17	Harrow Hill	0	0	0	0	0	0	0	0	Resigned to the Gloucestershire Northern Senior League, record expunged

Source: fchd
Rules for classification: 1) points; 2) goal difference; 3) number of goals scored.
