= 2010–11 Hellenic Football League =

The 2010–11 Hellenic Football League season was the 58th in the history of the Hellenic Football League, a football competition in England.

== Premier Division ==
Hellenic Football League Premier Division
- Season: 2010–11
- Champions: Wantage Town
- Relegated: Pegasus Juniors
- Matches: 462
- Goals: 1,747 (3.78 per match)

Premier Division featured 17 clubs which competed in the division last season, along with five new clubs:

- Bracknell Town, relegated from the Southern Football League
- Slimbridge, promoted from Division One West
- Thame United, promoted from Division One East
- Wokingham & Emmbrook, promoted from Division One East
- Wootton Bassett Town, promoted from Division One West

=== League table ===
Pos	Team	Pld	W	D	L	GF	GA	GD	Pts	Promotion or relegation
1	Wantage Town	42	29	5	8	109	51	+58	92	
2	Binfield	42	27	8	7	108	43	+65	89	
3	Ardley United	42	27	7	8	108	44	+64	88	
4	Highworth Town	42	28	4	10	108	52	+56	88	
5	Slimbridge	42	27	7	8	80	52	+28	88	
6	Shortwood United	42	25	7	10	111	53	+58	82	
7	Kidlington	42	26	4	12	93	57	+36	82	
8	Flackwell Heath	42	19	10	13	82	52	+30	64 (Note: Flackwell Heath were deducted three points.)	
9	Old Woodstock Town	42	20	7	15	86	78	+8	64 (Note: Old Woodstock Town were deducted three points.)	Demoted to Division One West
10	Thame United	42	17	10	15	66	61	+5	61	
11	Wokingham & Emmbrook	42	17	9	16	76	71	+5	60	
12	Ascot United	42	17	7	18	98	83	+15	58	
13	Reading Town	42	15	8	19	75	86	−11	52 (Note: Reading Town were deducted one point.)	
14	Abingdon Town	42	15	6	21	76	85	−9	51	
15	Wootton Bassett Town	42	13	7	22	55	87	−32	46	Demoted to Division One West
16	Bracknell Town	42	12	10	20	65	99	−34	46	
17	Oxford City Nomads	42	14	4	24	84	120	−36	46	
18	Witney United	42	11	9	22	67	93	−26	42	
19	Carterton	42	11	7	24	60	101	−41	37 (Note: Carterton were deducted three points.)	Demoted to Division One West
20	Shrivenham	42	7	8	27	56	99	−43	29	
21	Fairford Town	42	4	8	30	46	125	−79	20	
22	Pegasus Juniors	42	3	4	35	39	156	−117	13	Relegated to the West Midlands (Regional) League

Source: fchd
Rules for classification: 1) points; 2) goal difference; 3) number of goals scored.

== Division One East ==
Hellenic Football League Division One East
- Season: 2010–11
- Champions: Holyport
- Promoted: Henley Town; Holyport
- Matches: 182
- Goals: 632 (3.47 per match)

Division One East featured 13 clubs which competed in the division last season, along with one new club:

- Hungerford Town reserves, promoted from Reserve Division One

=== League table ===
Pos	Team	Pld	W	D	L	GF	GA	GD	Pts	Promotion or relegation
1	Holyport	26	18	4	4	62	29	+33	58	Promoted to the Premier Division
2	Henley Town	26	16	5	5	48	23	+25	53	Promoted to the Premier Division
3	Newbury	26	16	2	8	63	37	+26	50	
4	Milton United	26	14	5	7	57	50	+7	47	
5	Woodley Town	26	14	7	5	54	36	+18	46 (Note: Woodley Town were deducted three points.)	
6	Chalfont Wasps	26	14	4	8	51	40	+11	46	
7	Rayners Lane	26	14	1	11	38	29	+9	43	
8	Hungerford Town reserves	26	12	3	11	48	44	+4	39	
9	Farnborough reserves	26	9	5	12	43	46	−3	32	Resigned from the league
10	Penn & Tylers Green	26	7	6	13	37	47	−10	27	
11	Finchampstead	26	7	4	15	39	59	−20	25	
12	South Kilburn	26	5	4	17	34	58	−24	19	Transferred to the Combined Counties League
13	Chinnor	26	3	8	15	29	60	−31	17	
14	Didcot Town reserves	26	2	4	20	29	74	−45	10	

Source: fchd
Rules for classification: 1) points; 2) goal difference; 3) number of goals scored.

== Division One West ==
Hellenic Football League Division One West
- Season: 2010–11
- Champions: Headington Amateurs
- Promoted: Cheltenham Saracens
- Relegated: Launton Sports
- Matches: 210
- Goals: 797 (3.8 per match)

Division One West featured twelve clubs which competed in the division last season, along with three new clubs, relegated from the Premier Division:

- Bicester Town
- Hook Norton
- Malmesbury Victoria

=== League table ===
Pos	Team	Pld	W	D	L	GF	GA	GD	Pts	Promotion or relegation
1	Headington Amateurs	28	20	3	5	81	42	+39	63	
2	Bicester Town	28	18	4	6	61	30	+31	58	Promoted to the Premier Division
3	Cheltenham Saracens	28	17	6	5	80	41	+39	57	Promoted to the Premier Division
4	Clanfield	28	17	4	7	64	35	+29	55	
5	Lydney Town	28	14	6	8	64	42	+22	48	
6	Purton	28	14	5	9	62	51	+11	47	
7	Cricklade Town	28	13	7	8	74	46	+28	46	
8	Tytherington Rocks	28	9	8	11	48	47	+1	35	
9	Letcombe	28	9	7	12	43	59	−16	34	Transferred to Division One East
10	Winterbourne United	28	9	6	13	58	54	+4	33	
11	Easington Sports	28	9	5	14	33	46	−13	32	
12	Trowbridge Town	28	9	2	17	36	65	−29	29	
13	Malmesbury Victoria	28	8	3	17	40	79	−39	27	
14	Hook Norton	28	6	5	17	38	59	−21	23	
15	Launton Sports	28	1	3	24	15	101	−86	6	Resigned to the Oxfordshire Senior League

Source: fchd
Rules for classification: 1) points; 2) goal difference; 3) number of goals scored.
