= 2008–09 Hellenic Football League =

The 2008–09 Hellenic Football League season was the 56th in the history of the Hellenic Football League, a football competition in England.

== Premier Division ==
Hellenic Football League Premier Division
- Season: 2008–09
- Champions: Hungerford Town
- Promoted: Hungerford Town
- Relegated: Harrow Hill; Milton United
- Matches: 462
- Goals: 1,612 (3.49 per match)

Premier Division featured 18 clubs which competed in the division last season, along with four new clubs:

- Chalfont Wasps, promoted from Division One East
- Marlow United, promoted from Division One East
- Old Woodstock Town, promoted from Division One West
- Reading Town, transferred from the Combined Counties League

=== League table ===
Pos	Team	Pld	W	D	L	GF	GA	GD	Pts	Promotion or relegation
1	Hungerford Town	42	29	9	4	103	38	+65	96	Promoted to the Southern Football League
2	Shortwood United	42	29	9	4	99	45	+54	96	
3	Witney United	42	28	7	7	105	55	+50	91	
4	Almondsbury Town	42	28	7	7	106	41	+65	90 (Note: Almondsbury Town were deducted one point.)	
5	Ardley United	42	23	11	8	85	58	+27	80	
6	Highworth Town	42	24	5	13	88	60	+28	77	
7	Chalfont Wasps	42	22	4	16	77	70	+7	70	Demoted to the Division One East
8	Reading Town	42	19	10	13	88	49	+39	67	
9	Kidlington	42	17	9	16	70	65	+5	60	
10	Pegasus Juniors	42	17	4	21	73	82	−9	55	
11	Wantage Town	42	17	3	22	71	69	+2	54	
12	Carterton	42	15	8	19	70	79	−9	53	
13	Hook Norton	42	14	10	18	69	81	−12	52	
14	Fairford Town	42	13	12	17	62	67	−5	51	
15	Marlow United	42	16	3	23	69	98	−29	51	
16	Flackwell Heath	42	16	5	21	80	86	−6	50 (Note: Flackwell Heath were deducted three points.)	
17	Old Woodstock Town	42	13	10	19	59	70	−11	49	
18	Shrivenham	42	12	4	26	49	87	−38	40	
19	Abingdon Town	42	11	5	26	43	86	−43	38	
20	Bicester Town	42	10	6	26	48	114	−66	36	
21	Milton United	42	8	6	28	52	105	−53	30	Relegated to Division One East
22	Harrow Hill	42	4	7	31	46	107	−61	19	Relegated to Division One West

Source: fchd
Rules for classification: 1) points; 2) goal difference; 3) number of goals scored.

== Division One East ==
Hellenic Football League Division One East
- Season: 2008–09
- Champions: Binfield
- Promoted: Ascot United; Binfield
- Matches: 306
- Goals: 1,107 (3.62 per match)

Division One East featured 15 clubs which competed in the division last season, along with three clubs:

- Launton Sports, transferred from Division One West
- Newbury, joined from the Reading Football League
- South Kilburn, joined from the Middlesex County League

=== League table ===
Pos	Team	Pld	W	D	L	GF	GA	GD	Pts	Promotion or relegation
1	Binfield	34	29	3	2	89	18	+71	90	Promoted to the Premier Division
2	Ascot United	34	25	4	5	91	35	+56	79	Promoted to the Premier Division
3	Newbury	34	20	11	3	100	41	+59	71	
4	Wokingham & Emmbrook	34	20	6	8	86	44	+42	66	
5	Holyport	34	16	9	9	76	60	+16	57	
6	South Kilburn	34	15	8	11	68	62	+6	53	
7	Henley Town	34	13	13	8	65	43	+22	52	
8	Chinnor	34	14	9	11	51	48	+3	51	
9	Thame United	34	13	10	11	64	45	+19	49	
10	Kintbury Rangers	34	15	4	15	69	58	+11	49	
11	Finchampstead	34	12	12	10	64	43	+21	48	
12	Penn & Tylers Green	34	10	9	15	46	59	−13	39	
13	Englefield Green Rovers	34	9	9	16	52	73	−21	36	Club folded
14	Rayners Lane	34	8	7	19	45	63	−18	31	
15	Launton Sports	34	7	5	22	45	91	−46	26	Transferred to Division One West
16	Bisley	34	5	10	19	42	74	−32	25	Became Farnborough F.C. reserves
17	Prestwood	34	5	4	25	29	130	−101	19	
18	Eton Wick	34	1	5	28	25	120	−95	8	

Source: fchd
Rules for classification: 1) points; 2) goal difference; 3) number of goals scored.

== Division One West ==
Hellenic Football League Division One West
- Season: 2008–09
- Champions: Hardwicke
- Promoted: Malmesbury Victoria; Oxford City Nomads
- Matches: 272
- Goals: 1,043 (3.83 per match)

Division One West featured 15 clubs which competed in the division last season, along with two new clubs:

- Hardwicke, joined from the Gloucestershire County League
- Lydney Town, demoted from the Premier Division

=== League table ===
Pos	Team	Pld	W	D	L	GF	GA	GD	Pts	Promotion or relegation
1	Hardwicke	32	27	3	2	93	18	+75	84	Resigned to the Gloucestershire County League
2	Malmesbury Victoria	32	21	6	5	91	45	+46	69	Promoted to the Premier Division
3	Oxford City Nomads	32	20	4	8	80	51	+29	64	Promoted to the Premier Division
4	Wootton Bassett Town	32	17	9	6	61	30	+31	60	
5	Letcombe	32	17	6	9	88	52	+36	57	
6	Purton	32	17	6	9	85	59	+26	57	
7	Winterbourne United	32	15	5	12	77	54	+23	50	
8	Lydney Town	32	14	7	11	45	45	0	49	
9	Tytherington Rocks	32	13	8	11	48	40	+8	46 (Note: Tytherington Rocks were deducted one point.)	
10	Headington Amateurs	32	11	8	13	72	64	+8	41	
11	Clanfield	32	11	6	15	51	63	−12	39	
12	Cheltenham Saracens	32	10	7	15	52	63	−11	37	
13	Easington Sports	32	9	6	17	45	69	−24	33	
14	Trowbridge Town	32	10	2	20	40	67	−27	32	
15	Cricklade Town	32	7	3	22	50	97	−47	24	
16	Cirencester United	32	4	3	25	34	130	−96	15	
17	Pewsey Vale	32	3	3	26	31	96	−65	12	Resigned to the Wiltshire Football League

Source: fchd
Rules for classification: 1) points; 2) goal difference; 3) number of goals scored.
