= 2009–10 Southern Football League =

The 2009–10 season was the 107th in the history of the Southern League, which is an English football competition featuring semi-professional and amateur clubs from the South West, South Central and Midlands of England and South Wales.

At the end of the previous season Division One Midlands was renamed Division One Central.

== Premier Division ==
The Premier Division consisted of 22 clubs, including 17 clubs from the previous season and five new clubs:

- Two clubs promoted from Division One Midlands:
  - Leamington
  - Nuneaton Town
- Two clubs promoted from Division One South & West:
  - Didcot Town
  - Truro City
- Plus:
  - Hednesford Town, transferred from Northern Premier League

Farnborough won the Premier Division and were promoted to the Conference South, while play-off winners Nuneaton Town achieved the second promotion in two seasons after club reorganization to return in Conference.

Clevedon Town and Rugby Town were the only clubs relegated this season, while Merthyr Tydfil were expelled from the league after failing to meet a FA deadline to give assurances that they could trade effectively during 2010–11, liquidated and reborn under the name Merthyr Town three divisions below Southern League Premier Division. Tiverton Town and Hemel Hempstead Town were reprieved from relegation due to clubs higher up the pyramid folded and demoted.

=== League table ===
Southern Football League Premier Division
- Season: 2009–10
- Champions: Farnborough
- Promoted: Farnborough; Nuneaton Town
- Relegated: Clevedon Town; Rugby Town
- Matches: 462
- Goals: 1,439 (3.11 per match)
- Top goalscorer: Stefan Moore (Halesowen Town) - 35
- Biggest home win: Hednesford Town 6 – 0 Rugby Town, 5 April 2010; Stourbridge 6 – 0 Rugby Town, 17 April 2010
- Biggest away win: Swindon Supermarine 0 – 7 Farnborough, 28 November 2009
- Highest scoring: Stourbridge 7 – 0 Truro City, 5 December 2009
- Highest attendance: 1765 (Nuneaton Town 1 – 1 Farnborough, 10 April 2010)
- Lowest attendance: 80 (Clevedon Town 1 – 2 Oxford City, 20 April 2010)
- Average attendance: 348

Pos	Team	Pld	W	D	L	GF	GA	GD	Pts	Promotion or relegation
1	Farnborough	42	28	9	5	100	44	+56	93	Promoted to the Conference South
2	Nuneaton Town	42	26	10	6	90	37	+53	88	Qualified for the play-offs, then promoted to the Conference North
3	Chippenham Town	42	21	11	10	67	43	+24	74	Qualified for the play-offs
4	Hednesford Town	42	20	13	9	79	51	+28	73	Qualified for the play-offs
5	Brackley Town	42	21	9	12	83	61	+22	72	Qualified for the play-offs
6	Cambridge City	42	18	17	7	73	44	+29	71	
7	Bashley	42	20	11	11	79	61	+18	71	
8	Halesowen Town	42	21	17	4	84	53	+31	70 (Note: Merthyr Tydfil and Halesowen Town deducted 10 points for entering administration)	
9	Stourbridge	42	19	13	10	80	65	+15	70	
10	Leamington	42	19	8	15	84	75	+9	65	
11	Truro City	42	17	11	14	78	65	+13	62	
12	Banbury United	42	14	13	15	53	67	−14	55	
13	Oxford City	42	13	15	14	63	66	−3	54	
14	Swindon Supermarine	42	10	14	18	48	76	−28	44	
15	Didcot Town	42	10	11	21	56	70	−14	41	
16	Evesham United	42	9	14	19	35	52	−17	41	
17	Merthyr Tydfil	42	12	11	19	62	72	−10	37	Expelled after the end of the season, and folded
18	Bedford Town	42	9	10	23	50	88	−38	37	
19	Tiverton Town	42	8	12	22	35	61	−26	36	Reprieved from relegation
20	Hemel Hempstead Town	42	8	10	24	50	81	−31	34	Reprieved from relegation
21	Clevedon Town	42	6	11	25	48	92	−44	29	Relegated to Division One South & West
22	Rugby Town	42	4	8	30	41	114	−73	20	Relegated to Division One Central

Source: fchd.com
Rules for classification: 1) points; 2) goal difference; 3) number of goals scored.

=== Play-offs ===
Semifinals
2	Nuneaton Town	6
5	Brackley Town	0
3	Chippenham Town	2
4	Hednesford Town	0

Final
2	Nuneaton Town	2
3	Chippenham Town	1

=== Results ===
Home \ Away	BAN	BAS	BED	BRK	CAM	CHI	CLE	DID	EVE	FAR	HAL	HED	HEM	LEA	MER	NUN	OXC	RUG	STB	SWI	TIV	TRU
Banbury United		1–1	0–0	0–3	1–0	0–0	4–3	1–0	0–1	0–3	2–1	3–2	1–1	1–2	3–1	2–1	1–1	2–1	3–3	3–1	0–1	0–0
Bashley	1–0		1–2	5–2	0–2	0–1	3–2	3–2	2–1	0–4	1–2	0–4	3–0	1–1	3–2	2–1	3–2	4–0	4–4	3–0	0–1	2–0
Bedford Town	1–1	0–4		2–2	0–2	1–2	3–1	1–5	1–2	2–2	1–1	3–2	5–0	0–2	2–4	2–1	1–1	3–1	0–1	1–2	2–0	0–2
Brackley Town	5–1	2–3	3–0		0–0	0–1	2–1	2–2	3–1	1–3	2–1	0–1	2–0	1–0	1–0	0–0	1–2	3–1	3–2	1–2	2–0	4–3
Cambridge City	2–1	2–2	4–2	5–0		1–0	4–1	4–1	1–1	1–1	1–1	0–3	1–1	2–2	1–1	1–1	2–0	1–0	6–1	5–0	1–1	0–3
Chippenham Town	5–0	1–2	3–0	2–3	2–1		2–0	2–0	2–1	2–0	1–1	0–1	6–1	4–2	1–5	2–1	2–0	1–0	2–2	0–1	4–2	2–1
Clevedon Town	1–2	0–2	0–3	0–3	0–1	0–0		1–1	1–4	1–4	3–3	0–3	1–0	1–3	1–1	0–3	1–2	1–3	4–1	2–6	0–1	0–3
Didcot Town	0–0	1–1	2–2	0–1	0–3	0–2	0–1		0–2	1–2	1–2	0–1	2–1	4–2	3–0	1–1	4–4	3–1	0–1	0–2	1–1	1–1
Evesham United	3–2	0–0	0–0	1–3	3–1	0–0	0–0	0–1		1–2	0–0	0–0	0–2	0–1	1–1	1–2	0–0	1–0	1–1	0–1	2–2	0–2
Farnborough	3–0	1–1	6–1	3–0	3–3	3–1	2–1	1–0	3–1		4–1	2–1	3–0	3–1	3–1	0–2	2–1	4–1	1–2	2–0	2–1	3–1
Halesowen Town	0–2	3–2	4–1	1–1	1–1	2–0	2–2	3–1	1–0	1–1		2–2	1–0	3–0	1–1	3–2	3–3	5–1	2–1	2–0	1–1	3–2
Hednesford Town	0–0	1–0	2–1	1–4	2–2	1–1	0–0	1–2	2–1	4–0	2–2		4–3	4–2	1–1	0–3	4–2	6–0	1–1	0–0	2–1	2–3
Hemel Hempstead Town	2–3	0–1	5–1	1–1	2–3	0–1	1–1	1–2	2–0	1–1	3–5	2–2		0–2	3–1	1–3	2–1	1–0	2–2	3–1	0–2	0–2
Leamington	3–3	0–1	2–0	2–1	1–0	4–4	0–1	3–5	1–2	2–3	2–2	1–2	3–1		5–3	0–2	3–1	2–1	2–1	3–1	5–0	1–3
Merthyr Tydfil	3–2	2–1	0–0	2–1	0–1	2–1	2–3	4–2	2–1	0–0	0–2	1–2	1–2	2–3		1–3	2–3	1–1	2–1	1–0	1–1	1–2
Nuneaton Town	5–0	5–2	4–0	2–2	1–1	0–1	4–2	2–0	2–0	1–1	1–1	3–1	3–1	1–1	3–1		3–1	1–1	0–0	1–0	1–0	4–0
Oxford City	1–1	1–1	4–1	2–3	0–1	0–0	1–2	1–1	3–0	1–1	2–2	2–0	2–2	1–1	2–2	1–4		3–0	1–3	2–1	1–0	2–2
Rugby Town	0–2	2–3	1–4	1–4	0–3	0–0	4–4	4–3	0–0	0–4	0–3	1–6	2–2	1–4	1–4	0–3	4–0		1–2	0–0	3–2	1–1
Stourbridge	2–1	2–2	2–0	4–2	3–1	1–0	4–1	1–0	0–0	3–2	1–4	1–1	2–0	2–1	2–0	1–2	0–2	6–0		0–0	2–1	7–2
Swindon Supermarine	1–2	3–3	0–0	1–7	1–1	1–1	3–2	1–1	1–1	0–7	1–2	0–0	1–0	2–3	1–1	2–4	2–4	5–1	2–2		2–1	0–4
Tiverton Town	2–1	0–5	2–0	1–1	0–0	0–0	0–0	1–2	0–1	0–2	0–2	0–2	0–0	2–3	0–1	1–2	1–0	3–1	2–2	0–0		1–2
Truro City	1–1	1–1	5–1	1–1	1–1	3–5	2–2	2–1	1–2	2–3	1–2	1–2	3–1	2–2	3–1	0–2	0–1	4–1	4–1	0–0	2–0	

Source: Southern Football League
Legend: Blue = home team win; Yellow = draw; Red = away team win.

=== Stadia and locations ===
Locations of the Premier Division clubs

Club	Stadium	Capacity
Banbury United	Spencer Stadium	2,000
Bashley	Bashley Road	2,000
Bedford Town	The Eyrie	3,000
Brackley Town	St. James Park	3,500
Cambridge City	City Ground	2,300
Chippenham Town	Hardenhuish Park	2,815
Clevedon Town	Hand Stadium	3,500
Didcot Town	Draycott Engineering Loop Meadow Stadium	3,000
Evesham United	St George's Lane (groundshare with Worcester City)	3,000
Farnborough	Cherrywood Road	7,000
Halesowen Town	The Grove	5,000
Hednesford Town	Keys Park	6,039
Hemel Hempstead Town	Vauxhall Road	3,152
Leamington	New Windmill Ground	3,000
Merthyr Tydfil	Penydarren Park	4,500
Nuneaton Borough	Liberty Way	4,614
Oxford City	Court Place Farm	2,000
Rugby Town	Butlin Road	6,000
Stourbridge	War Memorial Athletic Ground	2,626
Swindon Supermarine	Hunts Copse Ground	3,000
Tiverton Town	Ladysmead	3,500
Truro City	Treyew Road	3,200

== Division One Central ==
The division was renamed at the end of the previous season and consisted of 22 clubs, including 17 clubs from previous season Midland division and five new clubs:

- Three clubs transferred from Division One South & West:
  - Beaconsfield SYCOB
  - Burnham
  - Slough Town
- Plus:
  - Biggleswade Town, promoted from the Spartan South Midlands League
  - Hitchin Town, relegated from the Premier Division

Bury Town won the division in their second season in the Southern League and returned to the Isthmian League to take a place in Premier Division, while play-off winners Chesham United went back to Southern League Premier Division after three seasons of absence. Aylesbury United finished bottom of the table and were relegated to the lower leagues along with Rothwell United who resigned from the league at the end of the season. Thus, Barton Rovers finished second bottom were reprieved from relegation.

=== League table ===
Southern Football League Division One Central
- Season: 2009–10
- Champions: Bury Town
- Promoted: Bury Town; Chesham United
- Relegated: Aylesbury United
- Matches: 462
- Goals: 1,462 (3.16 per match)
- Top goalscorer: Jamie Arlick (Hitchin Town) - 29
- Biggest home win: Sutton Coldfield Town 6 – 0 Soham Town Rangers, 5 December 2009 Bury Town 8 – 2 Barton Rovers, 8 December 2009; Romulus 7 – 1 Beaconsfield SYCOB, 13 February 2009 Bury Town 6 – 0 Bedworth United, 13 February 2009
- Biggest away win: Rothwell Town 0 – 7 Biggleswade Town, 13 April 2010
- Highest scoring: Leighton Town 6 – 4 AFC Sudbury, 26 September 2009; Bury Town 8 – 2 Barton Rovers, 8 December 2009
- Highest attendance: 1550 (Bury Town 3 – 0 Marlow, 24 April 2010)
- Lowest attendance: 40 (Woodford United 1 – 3 Burnham, 2 March 2010)
- Average attendance: 167

Pos	Team	Pld	W	D	L	GF	GA	GD	Pts	Promotion or relegation
1	Bury Town	42	32	6	4	115	40	+75	102	Promoted to IL Premier Division
2	Hitchin Town	42	31	7	4	91	36	+55	100	Qualified for play-offs
3	Burnham	42	26	9	7	67	43	+24	87	Qualified for play-offs
4	Chesham United	42	24	8	10	76	41	+35	80	Qualified for play-offs, then promoted to the Premier Division
5	Slough Town	42	23	8	11	87	54	+33	77	Qualified for play-offs
6	Sutton Coldfield Town	42	22	11	9	93	61	+32	77	Transferred to NPL Division One South
7	Woodford United	42	18	8	16	70	68	+2	62	
8	Romulus	42	16	13	13	66	48	+18	61	Transferred to NPL Division One South
9	Arlesey Town	42	17	10	15	58	48	+10	61	
10	Leighton Town	42	18	6	18	63	66	−3	60	
11	Soham Town Rangers	42	17	7	18	73	80	−7	58	
12	Biggleswade Town	42	14	13	15	56	63	−7	55	
13	Atherstone Town	42	15	9	18	65	82	−17	54	
14	AFC Sudbury	42	13	12	17	55	54	+1	51	Transferred to IL Division One North
15	Marlow	42	12	14	16	64	65	−1	50	
16	Bedworth United	42	12	11	19	59	72	−13	47	
17	Stourport Swifts	42	11	10	21	63	69	−6	43	Transferred to Division One South & West
18	Rothwell Town	42	11	8	23	53	80	−27	41	Resigned to the United Counties League
19	Beaconsfield SYCOB	42	8	8	26	46	96	−50	32	
20	Bromsgrove Rovers	42	8	15	19	45	68	−23	29 (Note: Bromsgrove Rovers deducted 10 points for entering administration)	Transferred to Division One South & West
21	Barton Rovers	42	6	9	27	49	95	−46	27	Reprieved from relegation
22	Aylesbury United	42	4	6	32	48	133	−85	18	Relegated to the Spartan South Midlands League

Source: fchd.com
Rules for classification: 1) points; 2) goal difference; 3) number of goals scored.

=== Play-offs ===
Semifinals
2	Hitchin Town	1
5	Slough Town	2
3	Burnham	0
4	Chesham United	1

Final
4	Chesham United	4
5	Slough Town	0

=== Results ===
Home \ Away	SUD	ARL	ATH	AYL	BAR	BEA	BWU	BIG	BRO	BRN	BRT	CHE	HIT	LEI	MAR	ROM	RTH	SLO	SOH	SPS	SUT	WFU
AFC Sudbury		2–0	1–1	5–2	0–1	0–2	0–0	0–1	3–0	1–2	0–2	4–1	0–2	0–0	2–3	1–1	0–0	1–2	2–2	2–1	1–2	1–1
Arlesey Town	1–1		2–0	4–1	5–0	3–0	0–0	1–0	0–0	0–1	1–0	1–3	1–2	2–0	0–2	2–0	4–0	1–2	3–1	1–0	1–4	1–1
Atherstone Town	0–2	2–4		2–2	2–1	1–2	1–0	1–1	2–0	1–3	3–6	3–3	1–2	0–1	0–3	1–5	4–2	2–0	3–2	3–2	2–0	0–1
Aylesbury United	0–4	2–1	3–4		0–1	3–3	1–2	1–3	1–0	1–2	0–4	0–1	3–4	1–3	2–2	1–2	2–5	2–5	0–4	1–1	0–4	0–4
Barton Rovers	2–0	1–1	2–3	1–1		1–2	5–2	2–2	2–2	0–1	1–3	0–2	3–6	2–1	1–1	0–2	1–2	3–3	1–2	0–4	2–5	1–2
Beaconsfield Town	0–0	1–2	4–0	1–2	2–5		4–0	0–2	2–2	1–4	1–2	1–4	1–1	2–0	1–0	1–4	0–2	1–4	0–4	0–6	0–2	0–2
Bedworth United	2–2	1–3	4–0	2–2	2–0	1–0		4–0	1–1	0–1	2–2	2–1	1–1	1–2	4–1	0–1	1–3	2–4	2–5	4–0	2–4	3–1
Biggleswade Town	0–0	3–2	1–0	3–1	2–1	1–1	1–0		1–1	2–1	0–3	1–1	0–3	1–0	2–3	0–1	0–4	1–0	1–0	2–2	3–3	3–1
Bromsgrove Rovers	2–3	1–2	1–1	5–0	1–0	3–1	1–1	1–1		2–2	0–4	0–0	0–1	0–4	2–0	2–2	1–0	1–1	0–2	2–1	0–1	1–2
Burnham	1–2	0–0	2–2	1–0	2–1	2–0	2–0	2–1	3–0		1–2	2–1	0–0	1–1	2–2	0–0	2–0	1–1	3–0	2–1	1–5	1–0
Bury Town	3–1	3–1	3–1	6–2	8–2	5–1	6–0	2–1	1–0	2–3		1–1	0–0	5–0	3–0	5–0	3–1	1–0	2–1	3–1	2–2	4–5
Chesham United	3–2	0–0	3–0	2–0	3–0	1–0	0–1	3–0	2–0	0–1	1–1		2–0	1–2	3–2	0–3	3–0	1–0	2–3	3–0	4–1	3–0
Hitchin Town	1–0	4–1	2–1	5–1	3–0	4–1	1–0	1–0	1–1	4–0	1–0	1–2		3–0	3–0	2–0	4–0	3–2	1–2	2–1	3–2	3–0
Leighton Town	6–4	2–1	1–1	2–1	3–0	1–1	2–0	3–1	1–2	3–0	0–2	2–1	2–2		1–2	1–0	2–1	0–1	4–4	2–1	1–2	2–4
Marlow	2–0	1–1	1–1	4–0	1–0	3–0	3–3	0–0	2–4	0–1	1–2	1–1	1–1	0–2		1–2	1–0	0–1	6–1	2–2	2–4	0–1
Romulus	0–1	0–0	1–2	5–0	0–0	7–1	2–0	1–1	2–1	0–1	1–2	0–1	2–3	4–0	0–0		1–1	1–4	1–0	0–0	2–3	0–0
Rothwell Town	1–0	1–0	2–3	5–0	2–2	2–2	0–1	0–7	2–0	1–2	0–0	1–2	0–1	0–1	3–3	1–3		1–3	4–2	0–3	0–3	0–0
Slough Town	0–1	1–2	3–3	5–1	5–1	3–1	2–0	4–2	3–2	0–2	0–1	1–3	0–1	3–1	1–1	2–2	4–1		2–0	3–2	2–2	1–0
Soham Town Rangers	0–1	2–0	1–3	5–1	3–2	2–3	2–2	3–2	0–0	1–1	0–3	1–4	3–2	2–1	2–1	0–0	4–2	0–2		1–0	0–1	4–4
Stourport Swifts	1–1	0–1	1–3	5–4	2–0	0–0	2–0	0–0	5–1	1–4	1–2	1–1	0–1	2–0	2–1	2–4	1–1	1–4	1–2		1–0	3–4
Sutton Coldfield Town	0–2	1–0	1–2	0–2	1–1	2–1	1–1	5–2	1–1	3–1	3–4	2–1	1–3	3–2	2–2	2–2	3–0	2–2	6–0	1–1		2–1
Woodford United	3–2	2–2	1–0	6–1	1–0	3–1	2–5	1–1	4–1	1–3	0–2	0–2	1–3	2–1	2–3	3–2	1–2	0–1	1–0	1–2	1–1	

Source: Southern Football League
Legend: Blue = home team win; Yellow = draw; Red = away team win.

=== Stadia and locations ===
Locations of Division One Central clubs

Club	Stadium	Capacity
AFC Sudbury	King's Marsh	3,800
Arlesey Town	Hitchin Road	2,920
Atherstone Town	Sheepy Road	3,500
Aylesbury United	Bell Close (groundshare with Leighton Town)	2,800
Barton Rovers	Sharpenhoe Road	4,000
Beaconsfield SYCOB	Holloways Park	3,500
Bedworth United	The Oval	3,000
Biggleswade Town	The Carlsberg Stadium	3,000
Bromsgrove Rovers	Victoria Ground	4,893
Burnham	The Gore	2,500
Bury Town	Ram Meadow	3,500
Chesham United	The Meadow	5,000
Hitchin Town	Top Field	4,000
Leighton Town	Bell Close	2,800
Marlow	Alfred Davis Memorial Ground	3,000
Romulus	The Central Ground (groundshare with Sutton Coldfield Town)	2,000
Rothwell Town	Cecil Street	3,500
Slough Town	Holloways Park (groundshare with Beaconsfield SYCOB)	3,500
Soham Town Rangers	Julius Martin Lane	2,000
Stourport Swifts	Walshes Meadow	2,000
Sutton Coldfield Town	The Central Ground	2,000
Woodford United	Byfield Road	3,000

== Division One South & West ==
Division One South & West consisted of 22 clubs, including 16 clubs from previous season and six new clubs:

- Bedfont Green, promoted from the Combined Counties League
- Frome Town, promoted from the Western League
- Hungerford Town, promoted from the Hellenic League
- Mangotsfield United, relegated from the Premier Division
- VT, promoted from the Wessex League
- Yate Town, relegated from the Premier Division

Windsor & Eton won the division and got a place in Premier Division along with play-off winners Cirencester Town, who returned there at the second push. A.F.C. Hayes finished second bottom but were reprieved from relegation due to higher league clubs problems. Thus, Bracknell Town, finished bottom of the table, were the only club relegated to the lower league this season.

=== League table ===
Southern Football League Division One South & West
- Season: 2009–10
- Champions: Windsor & Eton
- Promoted: Windsor & Eton; Cirencester Town
- Relegated: Bracknell Town
- Matches: 462
- Goals: 1,551 (3.36 per match)
- Top goalscorer: Justin Bennett (Gosport Borough) - 32
- Biggest home win: Cirencester Town 11 – 1 Bracknell Town, 17 April 2010
- Biggest away win: Bracknell Town 0 – 9 North Leigh, 23 March 2010
- Highest scoring: Cirencester Town 11 – 1 Bracknell Town, 17 April 2010
- Highest attendance: 1016 (Bridgwater Town 1 – 0 Taunton Town, 1 January 2010)
- Lowest attendance: 28 (Bedfont Green 0 – 2 North Leigh, 13 April 2010) (Bracknell Town 0 – 4 Bishops Cleeve, 22 April 2010)
- Average attendance: 138

Pos	Team	Pld	W	D	L	GF	GA	GD	Pts	Promotion or relegation
1	Windsor & Eton	42	31	8	3	84	20	+64	101	Promoted to the Premier Division
2	AFC Totton	42	32	4	6	105	36	+69	100	Qualified for the play-offs
3	Bridgwater Town	42	26	11	5	83	30	+53	89	Qualified for the play-offs
4	VT	42	25	7	10	90	52	+38	82	Qualified for the play-offs
5	Cirencester Town	42	23	9	10	91	46	+45	78	Qualified for the play-offs, then promoted to the Premier Division
6	Frome Town	42	20	15	7	68	44	+24	75	
7	Paulton Rovers	42	20	10	12	73	58	+15	70	
8	Gosport Borough	42	19	10	13	80	59	+21	66 (Note: Gosport Borough deducted 1 point for fielding ineligible players)	
9	Mangotsfield United	42	19	5	18	77	67	+10	62	
10	North Leigh	42	18	7	17	83	72	+11	61	
11	Bishop's Cleeve	42	15	13	14	64	64	0	58	
12	Thatcham Town	42	17	6	19	76	72	+4	57	
13	Yate Town	42	15	10	17	58	64	−6	55	
14	Abingdon United	42	15	7	20	65	84	−19	52	
15	Uxbridge	42	14	6	22	70	85	−15	48	Transferred to Division One Central
16	Cinderford Town	42	13	8	21	66	78	−12	47	
17	Bedfont Green	42	12	8	22	77	90	−13	44	Transferred to Division One Central
18	Taunton Town	42	11	7	24	50	85	−35	40	
19	Andover	42	9	11	22	54	85	−31	38	
20	Hungerford Town	42	13	6	23	53	68	−15	33 (Note: Hungerford Town deducted 12 points for fielding ineligible player)	
21	A.F.C. Hayes	42	7	4	31	55	105	−50	25	Reprieved from relegation, then transferred to Division One Central
22	Bracknell Town	42	2	0	40	29	187	−158	6	Relegated to the Hellenic League

Source: fchd.com
Rules for classification: 1) points; 2) goal difference; 3) number of goals scored.

=== Play-offs ===
Semifinals
2	AFC Totton	2
5	Cirencester Town	3
3	Bridgwater Town	3
4	VT	0

Final
3	Bridgwater Town	3
5	Cirencester Town	4*

* after extra time

=== Results ===
Home \ Away	ABI	HAY	TOT	AND	BFG	BIS	BNT	BRI	CIN	CIR	FRO	GOS	HUN	MAN	NOR	PAU	TAU	THA	UXB	VT	W&E	YAT
Abingdon United		2–1	0–4	4–1	2–0	1–1	4–0	0–0	1–1	1–1	0–5	0–1	1–4	3–2	3–1	0–1	3–0	2–0	7–4	1–0	0–2	1–2
A.F.C. Hayes	1–2		0–2	3–1	1–1	4–2	7–1	0–2	4–3	1–6	2–3	0–1	0–4	0–5	4–6	0–1	1–5	1–2	0–4	2–1	1–2	1–4
AFC Totton	2–1	5–0		2–0	2–1	4–0	9–0	0–0	4–0	2–1	1–0	4–1	3–1	2–1	3–1	0–1	8–1	5–1	2–1	1–3	0–0	3–0
Andover	1–2	3–2	1–0		2–1	1–1	5–3	0–1	0–0	0–0	2–2	0–2	0–4	1–2	0–1	2–2	3–0	0–5	2–1	0–3	0–2	1–0
Bedfont Green	5–3	2–1	1–2	3–3		1–2	8–0	0–4	0–0	2–2	1–4	1–5	3–2	3–1	0–2	1–2	1–3	4–5	2–3	3–4	0–2	2–3
Bishop's Cleeve	2–2	3–1	1–4	2–2	0–3		1–0	2–1	2–2	0–1	0–2	2–2	4–1	3–2	5–2	1–2	1–1	1–0	4–2	0–1	2–0	2–2
Bracknell Town	0–2	0–7	1–2	0–3	0–1	0–4		2–5	2–7	0–4	2–3	2–3	0–2	0–3	0–9	0–3	2–1	2–6	1–3	2–0	1–5	0–4
Bridgwater Town	1–1	3–0	1–3	3–0	0–1	2–0	5–0		2–0	2–3	2–2	2–1	1–0	2–1	1–1	3–1	1–0	2–1	1–0	1–1	2–1	1–0
Cinderford Town	2–5	1–1	2–0	2–1	0–1	3–0	4–1	0–8		2–1	1–1	2–2	2–4	3–1	2–1	1–3	0–1	2–0	5–0	2–3	0–1	4–0
Cirencester Town	3–2	3–1	0–1	3–2	5–2	1–2	11–1	0–0	3–1		1–0	3–3	3–1	2–2	2–1	1–1	5–0	0–0	1–2	3–2	1–2	2–0
Frome Town	3–1	3–1	1–1	1–1	3–1	2–1	4–0	1–3	1–0	3–2		1–1	2–1	2–0	2–1	0–0	2–1	1–3	3–1	2–2	1–1	0–0
Gosport Borough	4–2	2–1	0–2	4–0	2–2	1–1	6–0	0–2	4–2	2–0	0–0		3–0	4–0	1–2	4–1	2–2	3–0	2–1	0–1	0–0	2–0
Hungerford Town	2–2	0–1	0–1	4–2	0–3	0–0	2–1	0–0	1–0	1–3	0–0	1–1		1–2	0–1	1–5	2–1	1–2	2–1	0–1	0–3	4–1
Mangotsfield United	0–2	1–0	1–2	4–3	3–2	2–2	9–0	2–2	3–1	0–3	2–0	3–0	0–2		3–1	1–2	4–0	1–0	1–0	0–1	0–4	1–0
North Leigh	1–1	1–1	0–2	3–1	1–4	1–3	8–0	0–4	4–2	2–1	4–0	5–1	2–0	2–3		3–1	2–0	3–1	1–1	2–2	0–3	2–0
Paulton Rovers	3–1	3–1	2–3	2–0	1–2	0–0	5–1	1–1	3–1	0–2	0–1	2–4	1–0	2–2	0–1		2–0	4–6	1–3	3–0	0–0	1–1
Taunton Town	4–0	1–1	3–3	2–2	2–2	2–1	2–1	0–2	1–0	0–4	0–3	1–0	0–0	0–3	3–1	0–2		2–3	3–2	0–4	0–1	0–1
Thatcham Town	4–0	5–2	1–2	1–3	1–1	0–2	5–0	1–4	1–0	1–1	1–1	2–3	2–1	0–1	2–2	0–1	2–1		3–1	1–3	0–0	3–1
Uxbridge	5–1	2–0	3–4	2–0	4–3	0–1	3–1	2–3	0–3	2–1	0–3	3–0	0–1	2–1	1–1	2–2	2–4	0–2		4–4	0–1	2–2
VT F.C.	7–0	5–0	0–3	2–2	4–0	3–1	4–1	0–2	2–2	0–0	3–0	2–1	3–1	3–1	2–0	2–4	2–1	2–0	2–0		0–3	3–2
Windsor & Eton	2–0	1–0	1–0	3–2	1–0	2–1	6–0	1–1	5–0	0–1	0–0	2–1	5–1	1–1	3–1	4–0	2–1	2–1	5–0	1–0		2–1
Yate Town	1–0	1–0	3–2	1–1	3–3	1–1	2–1	1–0	0–1	0–1	0–0	2–3	2–1	4–2	4–0	2–2	2–1	4–2	1–1	0–3	0–2	

Source: Southern Football League
Legend: Blue = home team win; Yellow = draw; Red = away team win.

=== Stadia and locations ===
Locations of Division One South & West clubs
Greater London Division One South & West clubs

Club	Stadium	Capacity
A.F.C. Hayes	Farm Park	1,500
AFC Totton	Testwood Stadium	3,000
Abingdon United	Northcourt Road	2,000
Andover	Portway Stadium	3,000
Bedfont Green	The Orchard	2,100
Bishops Cleeve	Kayte Lane	1,500
Bracknell Town	Larges Lane	2,500
Bridgwater Town	Fairfax Park	2,500
Cinderford Town	Causeway Ground	3,500
Cirencester Town	Corinium Stadium	4,500
Frome Town	Badgers Hill	2,000
Gosport Borough	Privett Park	4,500
Hungerford Town	Bulpit Lane	2,500
Mangotsfield United	Cossham Street	2,500
North Leigh	Eynsham Hall Park Sports Ground	2,000
Paulton Rovers	Athletic Field	2,500
VT	Universal Stadium	1,000
Taunton Town	Wordsworth Drive	2,500
Thatcham Town	Waterside Park	1,500
Uxbridge	Honeycroft	3,770
Windsor & Eton	Stag Meadow	4,500
Yate Town	Lodge Road	2,000

== See also ==
- Southern Football League
- 2009–10 Isthmian League
- 2009–10 Northern Premier League
