= 2010–11 Southern Football League =

The 2010–11 season was the 108th in the history of the Southern League, which is an English football competition featuring semi-professional and amateur clubs from the South West, South Central and Midlands of England and South Wales.

== Premier Division ==
The Premier Division consisted of 22 clubs, including 17 clubs from the previous season and five new clubs:

- Chesham United, promoted from Division One Central
- Cirencester Town, promoted from Division One South & West
- Salisbury City, demoted from the Conference Premier
- Weymouth, relegated from the Conference South
- Windsor & Eton, promoted from Division One South & West

At the end of the previous season Salisbury City failed to come out of administration and thus were relegated two divisions down due to a breach of Conference rules. In the middle of the season Windsor & Eton folded due to financial problems, the club was expelled from the league, their record was expunged.

Truro City won the Premier Division to earn a fourth promotion in five seasons, and were promoted to the Conference South along with play-off winners Salisbury City.

Didcot Town, Halesowen Town and Tiverton Town were relegated this season. No clubs were reprieved from relegation from Premier Division for the first time since 2005–06 season.

=== League table ===
Southern Football League Premier Division
- Season: 2010–11
- Champions: Truro City
- Promoted: Truro City; Salisbury City
- Relegated: Didcot Town; Halesowen Town; Tiverton Town
- Matches: 420
- Goals: 1,212 (2.89 per match)
- Top goalscorer: Craig Hammond (Cambridge City) - 31
- Biggest home win: Hednesford Town 9 – 0 Weymouth, 23 October 2010
- Biggest away win: Halesowen Town 0 – 8 Evesham United, 5 February 2011
- Highest scoring: Hednesford Town 9 – 0 Weymouth, 23 October 2010 Stourbridge 7–2 Weymouth, 6 November 2010 Truro City 7–2 Swindon Supermarine, 2 April 2011
- Highest attendance: 1696 (Truro City 3 – 2 Weymouth, 25 April 2011)
- Lowest attendance: 47 (Cirencester Town 5 – 0 Halesowen Town, 15 February 2011)
- Average attendance: 323

| Pos | Team | Pld | W | D | L | GF | GA | GD | Pts | Promotion or relegation |
|---|---|---|---|---|---|---|---|---|---|---|
| 1 | Truro City | 40 | 27 | 6 | 7 | 91 | 35 | +56 | 87 | Promoted to the Conference South |
| 2 | Hednesford Town | 40 | 26 | 5 | 9 | 82 | 38 | +44 | 83 | Qualified for the play-offs, then transferred to the Northern Premier League |
| 3 | Salisbury City | 40 | 23 | 10 | 7 | 82 | 45 | +37 | 79 | Qualified for the play-offs, then promoted to the Conference South |
| 4 | Cambridge City | 40 | 24 | 7 | 9 | 74 | 40 | +34 | 79 | Qualified for the play-offs |
| 5 | Leamington | 40 | 24 | 6 | 10 | 68 | 39 | +29 | 78 | Qualified for the play-offs |
| 6 | Chesham United | 40 | 20 | 11 | 9 | 64 | 35 | +29 | 71 | |
| 7 | Chippenham Town | 40 | 18 | 14 | 8 | 54 | 41 | +13 | 68 | |
| 8 | Stourbridge | 40 | 18 | 8 | 14 | 72 | 61 | +11 | 62 | |
| 9 | Brackley Town | 40 | 16 | 10 | 14 | 67 | 47 | +20 | 58 | |
| 10 | Swindon Supermarine | 40 | 17 | 7 | 16 | 56 | 58 | −2 | 58 | |
| 11 | Bashley | 40 | 14 | 10 | 16 | 55 | 63 | −8 | 52 | |
| 12 | Evesham United | 40 | 14 | 9 | 17 | 54 | 49 | +5 | 51 | |
| 13 | Cirencester Town | 40 | 13 | 8 | 19 | 59 | 67 | −8 | 47 | |
| 14 | Oxford City | 40 | 11 | 12 | 17 | 48 | 54 | −6 | 45 | |
| 15 | Hemel Hempstead Town | 40 | 13 | 6 | 21 | 50 | 59 | −9 | 45 | |
| 16 | Banbury United | 40 | 11 | 8 | 21 | 44 | 67 | −23 | 40 (Note: Banbury United deducted 1 point for fielding an ineligible player.) | |
| 17 | Bedford Town | 40 | 10 | 7 | 23 | 41 | 76 | −35 | 37 | |
| 18 | Weymouth | 40 | 12 | 8 | 20 | 55 | 85 | −30 | 34 (Note: Weymouth deducted 10 points for being in administration.) | |
| 19 | Didcot Town | 40 | 7 | 11 | 22 | 39 | 69 | −30 | 32 | Relegated to Division One South & West |
| 20 | Tiverton Town | 40 | 7 | 8 | 25 | 33 | 77 | −44 | 29 | Relegated to Division One South & West |
| 21 | Halesowen Town | 40 | 5 | 9 | 26 | 24 | 107 | −83 | 24 | Relegated to Division One South & West |
| 22 | Windsor & Eton | 0 | 0 | 0 | 0 | 0 | 0 | 0 | 0 | Club folded, record expunged (Note: Windsor & Eton FC was wound up in the High Court on 2 February 2011, due to unpaid taxes. Their record of P26 W8 D12 L6 GF33 GA35 Pts36 was expunged on 8 February.) |

Source: fchd.com
Rules for classification: 1) points; 2) goal difference; 3) number of goals scored.

=== Play-offs ===
Semifinals
2 | Hednesford Town | 3
5 | Leamington | 1
3 | Salisbury City | 1
4 | Cambridge City | 0

Final
2 | Hednesford Town | 2 (2)
3 | Salisbury City (pens) | 2 (3)

=== Stadia and locations ===
Locations of the Premier Division clubs

| Club | Stadium | Capacity |
|---|---|---|
| Banbury United | Spencer Stadium | 2,000 |
| Bashley | Bashley Road | 2,000 |
| Bedford Town | The Eyrie | 3,000 |
| Brackley Town | St. James Park | 3,500 |
| Cambridge City | City Ground | 2,300 |
| Chesham United | The Meadow | 5,000 |
| Chippenham Town | Hardenhuish Park | 2,815 |
| Cirencester Town | Corinium Stadium | 4,500 |
| Didcot Town | Draycott Engineering Loop Meadow Stadium | 3,000 |
| Evesham United | St George's Lane (groundshare with Worcester City) | 3,000 |
| Halesowen Town | The Grove | 5,000 |
| Hednesford Town | Keys Park | 6,039 |
| Hemel Hempstead Town | Vauxhall Road | 3,152 |
| Leamington | New Windmill Ground | 3,000 |
| Oxford City | Court Place Farm | 2,000 |
| Salisbury City | Raymond McEnhill Stadium | 5,000 |
| Stourbridge | War Memorial Athletic Ground | 2,626 |
| Swindon Supermarine | Hunts Copse Ground | 3,000 |
| Tiverton Town | Ladysmead | 3,500 |
| Truro City | Treyew Road | 3,200 |
| Weymouth | Bob Lucas Stadium | 6,600 |
| Windsor & Eton | Stag Meadow | 4,500 |

== Division One Central ==
Division One Central consisted of 22 clubs, including 13 clubs from previous season Midland division and nine new clubs:

- Three clubs transferred from Division One South & West:
  - A.F.C. Hayes
  - Bedfont Green, also changed name to Bedfont Town
  - Uxbridge
- Plus:
  - Ashford Town (Middlesex), relegated from Isthmian League Premier Division
  - Aylesbury, promoted from the Spartan South Midlands League
  - Daventry Town, promoted from the United Counties League
  - North Greenford United, promoted from the Combined Counties League
  - Northwood, transferred from Isthmian League Division One North
  - Rugby Town, relegated from the Premier Division

Arlesey Town won the division and were promoted to the Premier Division along with play-off winners Hitchin Town. Beaconsfield SYCOB finished bottom of the table were reprieved after Premier Division club Windsor & Eton folded and Atherstone Town resigned from the league.

=== League table ===
Southern Football League Division One Central
- Season: 2010–11
- Champions: Arlesey Town
- Promoted: Arlesey Town; Hitchin Town
- Matches: 462
- Goals: 1,547 (3.35 per match)
- Top goalscorer: John Frendo (Hitchin Town) - 28
- Biggest home win: Arlesey Town 12 – 0 Atherstone Town, 19 February 2011
- Biggest away win: Northwood 0 – 7 Hitchin Town, 11 December 2010; Atherstone Town 0 – 7 Marlow, 12 April 2011
- Highest scoring: Arlesey Town 12 – 0 Atherstone Town, 19 February 2011
- Highest attendance: 1508 (Hitchin Town 0 – 1 Arlesey Town, 25 April 2011)
- Lowest attendance: 37 (North Greenford United 2 – 2 Barton Rovers, 8 January 2011)
- Average attendance: 133

| Pos | Team | Pld | W | D | L | GF | GA | GD | Pts | Promotion or relegation |
|---|---|---|---|---|---|---|---|---|---|---|
| 1 | Arlesey Town | 42 | 30 | 7 | 5 | 108 | 34 | +74 | 88 (Note: Arlesey Town deducted 9 points for fielding an ineligible player.) | Promoted to the Premier Division |
| 2 | Hitchin Town | 42 | 26 | 9 | 7 | 107 | 44 | +63 | 87 | Qualified for the play-offs, then promoted to the Premier Division |
| 3 | Daventry Town | 42 | 26 | 9 | 7 | 95 | 47 | +48 | 81 (Note: Daventry Town deducted 6 points for fielding an ineligible player.) | Qualified for the play-offs |
| 4 | Biggleswade Town | 42 | 24 | 9 | 9 | 89 | 51 | +38 | 81 | Qualified for the play-offs |
| 5 | Slough Town | 42 | 24 | 4 | 14 | 91 | 66 | +25 | 76 | Qualified for the play-offs |
| 6 | Rugby Town | 42 | 20 | 11 | 11 | 74 | 56 | +18 | 71 | |
| 7 | Leighton Town | 42 | 19 | 12 | 11 | 72 | 50 | +22 | 69 | |
| 8 | Aylesbury | 42 | 19 | 11 | 12 | 73 | 62 | +11 | 68 | |
| 9 | Woodford United | 42 | 18 | 9 | 15 | 61 | 59 | +2 | 63 | |
| 10 | Bedfont Town | 42 | 17 | 12 | 13 | 66 | 66 | 0 | 63 | |
| 11 | Marlow | 42 | 15 | 9 | 18 | 68 | 65 | +3 | 54 | |
| 12 | Barton Rovers | 42 | 14 | 9 | 19 | 59 | 64 | −5 | 51 | |
| 13 | Uxbridge | 42 | 14 | 8 | 20 | 76 | 87 | −11 | 50 | |
| 14 | Burnham | 42 | 14 | 7 | 21 | 61 | 87 | −26 | 49 | |
| 15 | Bedworth United | 42 | 12 | 12 | 18 | 49 | 62 | −13 | 48 | |
| 16 | Ashford Town (Middlesex) | 42 | 13 | 8 | 21 | 69 | 85 | −16 | 47 | |
| 17 | Soham Town Rangers | 42 | 10 | 10 | 22 | 55 | 81 | −26 | 40 | Transferred to IL Division One North |
| 18 | North Greenford United | 42 | 10 | 10 | 22 | 51 | 86 | −35 | 40 | |
| 19 | A.F.C. Hayes | 42 | 11 | 6 | 25 | 54 | 96 | −42 | 39 | |
| 20 | Northwood | 42 | 11 | 6 | 25 | 59 | 106 | −47 | 39 | |
| 21 | Atherstone Town | 42 | 10 | 6 | 26 | 61 | 118 | −57 | 36 | Resigned to the Midland Football Alliance (Note: On 18 December 2010 Atherstone Town announced that they would be resigning from the Southern League at the end of the 2010–11 season.) |
| 22 | Beaconsfield SYCOB | 42 | 7 | 12 | 23 | 49 | 75 | −26 | 33 | Reprieved from relegation |

Source: fchd.com
Rules for classification: 1) points; 2) goal difference; 3) number of goals scored.

=== Play-offs ===
Semifinals
2 | Hitchin Town | 4
5 | Slough Town | 1
3 | Daventry Town | 2
4 | Biggleswade Town | 0

Final
2 | Hitchin Town | 2
3 | Daventry Town | 0

=== Stadia and locations ===
Locations of Division One Central clubs
Greater London Division One Central Clubs

| Club | Stadium | Capacity |
|---|---|---|
| A.F.C. Hayes | Farm Park | 1,500 |
| Arlesey Town | Hitchin Road | 2,920 |
| Ashford Town | The Robert Parker Stadium | 2,550 |
| Atherstone Town | Sheepy Road | 3,500 |
| Aylesbury | Haywood Way | 1,300 |
| Barton Rovers | Sharpenhoe Road | 4,000 |
| Beaconsfield SYCOB | Holloways Park | 3,500 |
| Bedfont Town | The Orchard | 2,100 |
| Bedworth United | The Oval | 3,000 |
| Biggleswade Town | The Carlsberg Stadium | 3,000 |
| Burnham | The Gore | 2,500 |
| Daventry Town | Communications Park | 5,000 |
| Hitchin Town | Top Field | 4,000 |
| Leighton Town | Bell Close | 2,800 |
| Marlow | Alfred Davis Memorial Ground | 3,000 |
| North Greenford United | Berkeley Fields | 2,000 |
| Northwood | Northwood Park | 3,075 |
| Rugby Town | Butlin Road | 6,000 |
| Slough Town | Holloways Park (groundshare with Beaconsfield SYCOB) | 3,500 |
| Soham Town Rangers | Julius Martin Lane | 2,000 |
| Uxbridge | Honeycroft | 3,770 |
| Woodford United | Byfield Road | 3,000 |

== Division One South & West ==
Division One South & West consisted of 22 clubs, including 16 clubs from previous season and six new clubs:

- Almondsbury Town, promoted from the Hellenic League
- Bideford, promoted from the Western League
- Bromsgrove Rovers, transferred from Division One Central
- Clevedon Town, relegated from the Premier Division
- Stourport Swifts, transferred from Division One Central
- Wimborne Town, promoted from the Wessex League

Before the start of the season Bromsgrove Rovers were removed from the league due to ground problems. No club was promoted to take the place of Bromsgrove, and therefore the season was played with 21 clubs. VT F.C. were renamed Sholing.

A.F.C. Totton won the title and were promoted to the Premier Division along with play-off winners Frome Town. In April 2011 it was announced that Almondsbury Town would resign from the league at the end of the season due to ground problems, and so Andover, the only South & West club that finished in the relegation zone, were reprieved.

=== League table ===
Southern Football League Division One South & West
- Season: 2010–11
- Champions: AFC Totton
- Promoted: AFC Totton; Frome Town
- Relegated: Almondsbury Town
- Matches: 420
- Goals: 1,308 (3.11 per match)
- Top goalscorer: Michael Gosney (AFC Totton) - 36
- Biggest home win: AFC Totton 9 – 0 Andover, 5 April 2011
- Biggest away win: Paulton Rovers 1 – 6 Sholing, 24 January 2011 Stourport Swifts 0 – 5 AFC Totton, 12 February 2011; Andover 0 – 5 Bishops Cleeve, 12 February 2011 Bridgwater Town 0 – 5 Yate Town, 26 March 2011
- Highest scoring: Abingdon United 5 – 4 Cinderford Town, 21 August 2010 North Leigh 5 – 4 Almondsbury Town, 8 January 2011; North Leigh 5 – 4 Bideford, 12 February 2011; North Leigh 6 – 3 Bridgwater Town, 29 March 2011 AFC Totton 9 – 0 Andover, 5 April 2011
- Highest attendance: 744 (AFC Totton 5 – 1 Paulton Rovers, 19 February 2011)
- Lowest attendance: 32 (Bishops Cleeve 1 – 1 Clevedon Town, 17 November 2010)
- Average attendance: 147

| Pos | Team | Pld | W | D | L | GF | GA | GD | Pts | Promotion or relegation |
|---|---|---|---|---|---|---|---|---|---|---|
| 1 | AFC Totton | 40 | 31 | 4 | 5 | 121 | 35 | +86 | 97 | Promoted to the Premier Division |
| 2 | Sholing | 40 | 30 | 5 | 5 | 90 | 27 | +63 | 95 | Qualified for the play-offs |
| 3 | Mangotsfield United | 40 | 26 | 7 | 7 | 79 | 48 | +31 | 85 | Qualified for the play-offs |
| 4 | Frome Town | 40 | 24 | 7 | 9 | 77 | 31 | +46 | 79 | Qualified for the play-offs, then promoted to the Premier Division |
| 5 | Thatcham Town | 40 | 20 | 7 | 13 | 70 | 43 | +27 | 67 | Qualified for the play-offs |
| 6 | North Leigh | 40 | 19 | 8 | 13 | 81 | 81 | 0 | 65 | |
| 7 | Hungerford Town | 40 | 17 | 12 | 11 | 58 | 43 | +15 | 63 | |
| 8 | Almondsbury Town | 40 | 17 | 12 | 11 | 62 | 54 | +8 | 63 (Note: On 7 April 2011 it was announced that Almondsbury Town would resign from the league at the end of the season due to the loss of their playing facilities.) | Resigned at the end of the season |
| 9 | Taunton Town | 40 | 16 | 10 | 14 | 49 | 49 | 0 | 58 | |
| 10 | Bideford | 40 | 17 | 7 | 16 | 68 | 73 | −5 | 58 | |
| 11 | Paulton Rovers | 40 | 15 | 12 | 13 | 64 | 63 | +1 | 57 | |
| 12 | Cinderford Town | 40 | 16 | 8 | 16 | 63 | 61 | +2 | 56 | |
| 13 | Gosport Borough | 40 | 16 | 7 | 17 | 58 | 65 | −7 | 55 | |
| 14 | Yate Town | 40 | 12 | 8 | 20 | 43 | 48 | −5 | 44 | |
| 15 | Bishop's Cleeve | 40 | 10 | 12 | 18 | 47 | 59 | −12 | 42 | |
| 16 | Abingdon United | 40 | 11 | 7 | 22 | 56 | 85 | −29 | 40 | |
| 17 | Stourport Swifts | 40 | 10 | 10 | 20 | 52 | 81 | −29 | 40 | |
| 18 | Bridgwater Town | 40 | 9 | 11 | 20 | 47 | 86 | −39 | 38 | |
| 19 | Wimborne Town | 40 | 10 | 5 | 25 | 45 | 81 | −36 | 35 | |
| 20 | Clevedon Town | 40 | 6 | 8 | 26 | 46 | 86 | −40 | 26 | |
| 21 | Andover | 40 | 2 | 5 | 33 | 32 | 109 | −77 | 11 | Reprieved from relegation |
| 22 | Bromsgrove Rovers | 0 | 0 | 0 | 0 | 0 | 0 | 0 | 0 | Removed from the league, club later folded |

Source: fchd.com
Rules for classification: 1) points; 2) goal difference; 3) number of goals scored.

=== Play-offs ===
Semifinals
2 | Sholing | 2
5 | Thatcham Town | 0
3 | Mangotsfield United | 1
4 | Frome Town | 3

Final
2 | Sholing | 0
4 | Frome Town | 1

=== Stadia and locations ===
Locations of Division One South & West clubs

| Club | Stadium | Capacity |
|---|---|---|
| AFC Totton | Testwood Stadium | 3,000 |
| Abingdon United | Northcourt Road | 2,000 |
| Almondsbury Town | Oaklands Park | 3,500 |
| Andover | Portway Stadium | 3,000 |
| Bideford | The Sports Ground | 2,000 |
| Bishops Cleeve | Kayte Lane | 1,500 |
| Bridgwater Town | Fairfax Park | 2,500 |
| Cinderford Town | Causeway Ground | 3,500 |
| Clevedon Town | Hand Stadium | 3,500 |
| Frome Town | Badgers Hill | 2,000 |
| Gosport Borough | Privett Park | 4,500 |
| Hungerford Town | Bulpit Lane | 2,500 |
| Mangotsfield United | Cossham Street | 2,500 |
| North Leigh | Eynsham Hall Park Sports Ground | 2,000 |
| Paulton Rovers | Athletic Field | 2,500 |
| Sholing | Universal Stadium | 1,000 |
| Stourport Swifts | Walshes Meadow | 2,000 |
| Taunton Town | Wordsworth Drive | 2,500 |
| Thatcham Town | Waterside Park | 1,500 |
| Wimborne Town | The Cuthbury | 3,250 |
| Yate Town | Lodge Road | 2,000 |

== League Cup ==
2010–11 Southern League Cup
Tournament details
- Country: England
- Teams: 65

Final positions
- Champions: Hednesford Town
- Runners-up: Hemel Hempstead Town

The Southern League Cup 2010–11 (billed as the RedInsure Cup 2010–11 for sponsorship reasons) is the 73rd season of the Southern League Cup, the cup competition of the Southern Football League. 65 clubs took part. The competition commenced on 21 September 2010. The winners were Hednesford Town who beat Hemel Hempstead Town 5–1 on aggregate over two legs.

=== Calendar ===
| Round | Matches played on | Matches | Clubs |
|---|---|---|---|
| Preliminary Round | 21 September 2010 | 2 | 65 → 63 |
| First round | 25 October 2010 to 3 November 2010 | 31 | 63 → 32 |
| Second Round | 23 November 2010 to 30 December 2010 | 16 | 32 → 16 |
| Third Round | 11 January 2011 to 18 January 2011 | 8 | 16 → 8 |
| Quarterfinals | 8 February 2011 | 4 | 8 → 4 |
| Semifinals | 1 March 2011 | 2 | 4 → 2 |
| Final | 5 and 12 April 2011 | 1 | 2 → 1 |

=== Preliminary round ===
In the preliminary round, the four clubs played each other for a places in the first round.

| Tie | Home team (tier) | Score | Away team (tier) | Att. |
| 1 | Daventry Town (C) | 3–2; AET | Brackley Town (P) | 134 |
| 2 | Truro City (P) | 0–1 | Bideford (SW) | 63 |

=== First round ===
The two clubs to have made it through the preliminary round were entered into the draw with sixty Southern League club, making sixty-two clubs, while Hednesford Town received a bye to the next round.

| Tie | Home team (tier) | Score | Away team (tier) | Att. |
| 3 | Abingdon United (SW) | 2–3 | Banbury United (P) | 65 |
| 4 | AFC Hayes (C) | 3–2; AET | Bedfont Town (C) | 31 |
| 5 | AFC Totton (SW) | 1–2 | Sholing (SW) | 127 |
| 6 | Ashford Town (C) | 2–2 | Northwood (C) | 39 |
Ashford Town advance 4–3 on penalties
| 7 | Atherstone Town (C) | 0–1 | Cinderford Town (SW) | 86 |
| 8 | Barton Rovers (C) | 0–2 | Cambridge City (P) | 111 |
| 9 | Bashley (P) | 5–2 | Weymouth (P) | 133 |
| 10 | Beaconsfield SYCOB (C) | 3–2 | Marlow (C) | 75 |
| 11 | Bedworth United (C) | 3–1 | Stourport Swifts (SW) | 57 |
| 12 | Bideford (SW) | 1–2 | Tiverton Town (P) | 166 |
| 13 | Biggleswade Town (C) | 0–2 | Arlesey Town (C) | 51 |
| 14 | Bishops Cleeve (SW) | 0–2 | Stourbridge (P) | 72 |
| 15 | Burnham (C) | 1–1 | North Greenford United (C) | 47 |
North Greenford United advance 4–1 on penalties
| 16 | Cirencester Town (P) | 6–4; AET | North Leigh (SW) | 27 |
| 17 | Clevedon Town (SW) | 4–0 | Almondsbury Town (SW) | 92 |
| 18 | Daventry Town (C) | 4–1 | Woodford United (C) | 158 |

| Tie | Home team (tier) | Score | Away team (tier) | Att. |
| 19 | Didcot Town (P) | 1–2 | Chippenham Town (P) | 73 |
| 20 | Evesham United (P) | 0–0 | Leamington (P) | 112 |
Leamington advance 3–1 on penalties
| 21 | Frome Town (SW) | 1–1 | Paulton Rovers (SW) | 202 |
Paulton Rovers advance 5–4 on penalties
| 22 | Gosport Borough (SW) | 2–0 | Andover (SW) | 84 |
| 23 | Halesowen Town (P) | 1–3 | Rugby Town (C) | 91 |
| 24 | Hemel Hempstead Town (P) | 2–1 | Soham Town Rangers (C) | 82 |
| 25 | Hitchin Town (C) | 2–1 | Bedford Town (P) | 122 |
| 26 | Leighton Town (C) | 1–3 | Slough Town (C) | 69 |
| 27 | Mangotsfield United (SW) | 3–0 | Yate Town (SW) | 109 |
| 28 | Oxford City (P) | 2–1; AET | Thatcham Town (SW) | 102 |
| 29 | Swindon Supermarine (P) | 3–4 | Hungerford Town (SW) | 103 |
| 30 | Taunton Town (SW) | 3–0 | Bridgwater Town (SW) | 264 |
| 31 | Uxbridge (C) | 2–4 | Aylesbury (C) | 36 |
| 32 | Wimborne Town (SW) | 1–2 | Salisbury City (P) | 253 |
| 33 | Windsor & Eton (SW) | 3–2 | Chesham United (P) | 100 |

=== Second round ===
The thirty-two clubs to have made it through the first round were entered into the second round draw. Hednesford Town received a bye to this round.

| Tie | Home team (tier) | Score | Away team (tier) | Att. |
| 34 | AFC Hayes (C) | 1–5 | Windsor & Eton (SW) | 48 |
| 35 | Arlesey Town (C) | 0–3 | Cambridge City (P) | 124 |
| 36 | Ashford Town (C) | 2–1 | Aylesbury (C) | 33 |
| 37 | Bashley (P) | 0–3 | Salisbury City (P) | 166 |
| 38 | Bedworth United (C) | 0–1 | Daventry Town (C) | 54 |
| 39 | Chippenham Town (P) | 1–0 | Paulton Rovers (SW) | 180 |
| 40 | Cinderford Town (SW) | 0–3 | Stourbridge (P) | 49 |
| 41 | Cirencester Town (P) | 3–1 | Hungerford Town (SW) | 63 |
| 42 | Clevedon Town (SW) | 3–0 | Tiverton Town (P) | 88 |

| Tie | Home team (tier) | Score | Away team (tier) | Att. |
| 43 | Hednesford Town (P) | 2–0 | Banbury United (P) | 123 |
| 44 | Hitchin Town (C) | 1–2; AET | Hemel Hempstead Town (P) | 94 |
| 45 | Leamington (P) | 3–0 | Rugby Town (C) | 285 |
| 46 | North Greenford United (C) | 5–1 | Beaconsfield SYCOB (C) | 48 |
| 47 | Oxford City (P) | 0–2 | Slough Town (C) | 87 |
| 48 | Sholing (SW) | 5–2 | Gosport Borough (SW) | 88 |
| 49 | Taunton Town (SW) | 2–2 | Mangotsfield United (SW) | 97 |
Taunton Town advance 5–4 on penalties

=== Third round ===
The sixteen clubs to have made it through the second round were entered into the third round draw.

| Tie | Home team (tier) | Score | Away team (tier) | Att. |
| 50 | Ashford Town (C) | 1–2 | Slough Town (C) | 85 |
| 51 | Cambridge City (P) | 1–0 | North Greenford United (C) | 113 |
| 52 | Cirencester Town (P) | 1–4 | Sholing (SW) | 41 |
| 53 | Clevedon Town (SW) | 1–3 | Taunton Town (SW) | 94 |

| Tie | Home team (tier) | Score | Away team (tier) | Att. |
| 54 | Leamington (P) | 0–1 | Hednesford Town (P) | 181 |
| 55 | Salisbury City (P) | 2–3 | Chippenham Town (P) | 302 |
| 56 | Stourbridge (P) | 2–1 | Daventry Town (C) | 141 |
| 57 | Windsor & Eton (P) | 2–0 | Hemel Hempstead Town^{1} (P) | 69 |

^{1} Hemel Hempsted Town advanced as Windsor & Eton resigned from the Southern League and folded.

=== Quarterfinals ===
| 8 February 2011 58 | Cambridge City (P) | 3–2 | Slough Town (C) | City Ground, Cambridge, Cambridge |
| 19:45 | Kolodynski 31'; Hughes 36'; Hammond 42' | Report | Sweeney 6'; Martin 44' (pen.) | Attendance: 170 |

| 8 February 2011 59 | Hednesford Town (P) | 4–2 | Stourbridge (P) | Keys Park, Hednesford |
| 19:45 | Wellecomme 38'; Patterson 83'; Robinson 86', 90' | Report | Canavan 56'; Rock 65' | Attendance: 215 |

| 8 February 2011 60 | Hemel Hempstead Town (P) | 2–2 (4 – 2 p) | Sholing (SW) | Vauxhall Road, Hemel Hempstead |
| 19:45 | Williams 30', 32' | Report | Gibbens 23'; B. Mason 57' | Attendance: 79 |

| 8 February 2011 61 | Taunton Town (SW) | 0–2 | Chippenham Town (P) | Wordsworth Drive, Taunton |
| 19:45 | | Report | Lamb 22'; Griffin 38' | Attendance: 166; Referee: Tony Mason (Sidcup) |

=== Semifinals ===
| 1 March 2011 62 | Chippenham Town (P) | 0–1 | Hednesford Town (P) | Hardenhuish Park, Chippenham |
| 19:45 | | Report | Tindle 6' (o.g.) | Attendance: 152 |

| 1 March 2011 63 | Hemel Hempstead Town (P) | 2–1 | Cambridge City (P) | Vauxhall Road, Hemel Hempstead |
| 19:45 | Pearce 32', 42' | Report | Kolodynski 59' | Attendance: 141 |

=== Final ===
| 5 April 2011 64 | Hemel Hempstead Town (P) | 1–2 | Hednesford Town (P) | Vauxhall Road, Hemel Hempstead |
| 19:45 | Pearce 29' | | Campion 32'; Petterson 65' | Attendance: 182 |

| 12 April 2011 65 | Hednesford Town (P) | 3–0 | Hemel Hempstead Town (P) | Keys Park, Hednesford |
| 19:45 | Clements 40', 90'; Robinson 90+5' | | | Attendance: 611 |

== See also ==
- Southern Football League
- 2010–11 Isthmian League
- 2010–11 Northern Premier League
