= Duran Martin =

Antiguan international footballer (born 1996)

Personal information
- Date of birth: 11 March 1996 (age 30)
- Place of birth: Oxford, England
- Position: Midfielder

Team information
- Current team: Thame United

Youth career
- –2014: Oxford United

Senior career*
Years	Team	Apps	(Gls)
2014	Old Woodstock Town		
2014–2015	Banbury United	8	(0)
2015	Old Woodstock Town		
2015–2016	Banbury United	38	(6)
2016–2017	Corby Town		
2017	Gosport Borough	9	(0)
2017	Banbury United	3	(0)
2017–2018	Kidlington		
2018–	Thame United		

International career^{‡}
2016–	Antigua and Barbuda	6	(0)
- * Club domestic league appearances and goals ‡ National team caps and goals as of 08:28, 25 May 2018 (UTC)

Duran Martin (born 11 March 1996) is an Antiguan international footballer who plays club football for Thame United as a midfielder.

== Club career ==
=== Early career ===
Martin played as a youth footballer for Oxford United before two spells at both Old Woodstock Town and Banbury United.

=== Corby Town ===
In September 2016 he joined Corby Town.

=== Gosport Borough ===
In January 2017 he signed for Gosport Borough.

=== Banbury United (third spell) ===
In the summer of 2017 he re-joined Banbury United.

=== Thame United ===
In the summer of 2018 he signed for Thame United.

== International career ==
He made his international debut for Antigua and Barbuda in 2016 on 23 March in a Caribbean Cup Qualifying match against Aruba.
