= 2012–13 Midland Football Combination =

The 2012–13 Midland Football Combination season was the 76th in the history of Midland Football Combination, a football competition in England.

== Premier Division ==
Midland Football Combination Premier Division
- Season: 2012–13
- Champions: Walsall Wood
- Promoted: Walsall Wood
- Matches: 306
- Goals: 1,119 (3.66 per match)

The Premier Division featured 13 clubs which competed in the division last season, along with six new clubs.

- Clubs promoted from the Division One:
  - Blackwood
  - Bromsgrove Sporting
  - Lichfield City
  - Littleton
- Plus:
  - Atherstone Town, relegated from the Midland Football Alliance
  - Stafford Town, transferred from the West Midlands (Regional) League

=== League table ===
Pos	Team	Pld	W	D	L	GF	GA	GD	Pts	Promotion or relegation
1	Walsall Wood	34	25	5	4	75	31	+44	80	Promoted to the Midland Football Alliance
2	Littleton	34	19	8	7	75	39	+36	65	
3	Earlswood Town	34	18	9	7	86	47	+39	63	
4	Nuneaton Griff	34	19	4	11	71	53	+18	61	
5	Brocton	34	17	7	10	76	51	+25	58	
6	Bromsgrove Sporting	34	18	6	10	73	54	+19	57 (Note: Atherstone Town and Bromsgrove Sporting deducted 3 points.)	
7	Southam United	34	16	6	12	69	59	+10	54	
8	Bolehall Swifts	34	16	6	12	56	49	+7	54	
9	Atherstone Town	34	17	5	12	63	52	+11	53	
10	Lichfield City	34	16	5	13	68	62	+6	53	
11	Stafford Town	34	15	7	12	73	52	+21	52	
12	Coventry Copsewood	34	13	10	11	58	55	+3	49	
13	Pershore Town	34	9	12	13	56	69	−13	39	
14	Pelsall Villa	34	8	4	22	39	75	−36	28	
15	Blackwood	34	6	9	19	47	83	−36	27	
16	Pilkington XXX	34	6	5	23	46	102	−56	23	
17	Racing Club Warwick	34	5	4	25	42	92	−50	19	
18	Castle Vale JKS	34	4	6	24	46	94	−48	18	
19	Bloxwich United	0	0	0	0	0	0	0	0	Club folded, record expunged

Source: fchd
Rules for classification: 1) points; 2) goal difference; 3) number of goals scored.

=== Results ===
Home \ Away	ATH	BLA	BOS	BRO	BRS	CAV	COV	EAR	LIC	LIT	NUN	PEL	PER	PIL	RCW	SOU	STA	WAW
Atherstone Town		4–0	0–1	3–2	1–0	3–0	6–2	1–2	4–2	0–1	1–0	3–1	3–0	3–1	3–1	2–1	0–1	0–3
Blackwood	3–0		2–2	1–1	1–4	3–2	2–1	2–5	2–2	3–5	1–4	1–1	3–3	1–1	2–1	0–1	2–1	1–0
Bolehall Swifts	1–2	2–1		1–0	0–0	3–0	0–3	1–3	1–0	3–0	1–2	0–2	1–2	3–2	3–0	1–1	2–1	1–1
Brocton	1–4	5–0	4–3		2–3	5–3	4–3	1–0	2–1	0–2	0–1	1–0	1–1	4–1	5–0	2–1	1–1	2–2
Bromsgrove Sporting	2–2	4–3	1–1	3–2		5–1	2–0	3–3	4–1	1–3	0–4	3–0	0–2	5–0	5–2	2–1	1–0	0–4
Castle Vale JKS	1–1	3–2	0–1	2–5	0–2		2–2	0–2	0–2	1–3	3–5	2–1	2–2	2–2	3–0	1–2	1–2	1–5
Coventry Copsewood	1–1	4–2	3–1	1–3	3–3	2–2		1–1	2–1	1–1	0–3	3–1	2–1	5–0	4–2	1–1	0–4	0–2
Earlswood Town	6–1	4–0	1–3	1–1	1–0	1–0	2–2		1–3	1–1	2–2	5–1	4–1	4–0	2–1	3–0	3–1	4–0
Lichfield City	1–4	0–0	4–3	0–1	2–0	2–1	1–0	3–2		1–2	2–1	2–1	2–1	3–1	5–2	1–2	3–3	0–3
Littleton	1–1	1–1	2–0	1–1	0–3	5–1	3–1	2–2	4–2		3–0	5–0	1–1	2–2	5–1	3–0	1–0	2–3
Nuneaton Griff	1–2	3–1	3–1	1–4	3–1	6–1	1–1	4–3	4–1	1–0		3–1	2–0	1–2	1–0	1–4	1–5	0–1
Pelsall Villa	2–1	2–1	0–2	0–5	2–3	4–0	1–1	2–4	0–3	1–0	1–2		3–3	4–2	0–2	2–4	0–3	1–2
Pershore Town	3–1	4–2	0–5	3–1	2–2	1–0	1–2	1–3	1–1	0–1	2–2	2–0		4–0	2–2	3–3	0–0	1–2
Pilkington XXX	2–1	1–0	1–3	0–4	0–5	1–5	0–1	1–1	1–5	5–3	2–5	0–1	3–3		3–2	2–3	1–5	1–3
Racing Club Warwick	2–3	2–2	1–2	2–0	2–1	4–0	0–2	1–5	2–2	0–7	1–2	1–2	0–4	3–1		0–2	1–1	1–3
Southam United	4–0	3–2	1–2	2–2	4–1	5–2	0–2	1–1	4–3	0–3	2–1	3–1	5–1	1–3	3–2		2–3	1–1
Stafford Town	2–2	6–0	2–2	1–3	1–2	3–2	0–2	3–2	2–5	0–1	4–1	1–1	5–1	5–3	5–0	1–0		0–4
Walsall Wood	1–0	1–0	4–0	3–1	1–2	2–2	1–0	3–2	1–2	2–1	0–0	2–0	5–0	2–1	2–1	4–2	2–1	

Legend: Blue = home team win; Yellow = draw; Red = away team win.
