= 2011–12 West Midlands (Regional) League =

The 2011–12 West Midlands (Regional) League season was the 112th in the history of the West Midlands (Regional) League, an English association football competition for semi-professional and amateur teams based in the West Midlands county, Shropshire, Herefordshire, Worcestershire and southern Staffordshire. It has three divisions, the highest of which is the Premier Division, which sits at step 6 of the National League System, or the tenth level of the overall English football league system.

== Premier Division ==
West Midlands League Premier Division
- Season: 2011–12
- Champions: Gornal Athletic
- Promoted: Gornal Athletic
- Matches: 462
- Goals: 1,734 (3.75 per match)

The Premier Division featured 18 clubs which competed in the division last season, along with four new clubs:

- Black Country Rangers, promoted from Division One
- Malvern Town, relegated from the Midland Football Alliance
- Pegasus Juniors, relegated from the Hellenic Football League
- Sporting Khalsa, promoted from Division One

=== League table ===
Pos	Team	Pld	W	D	L	GF	GA	GD	Pts	Promotion or relegation
1	Gornal Athletic	42	33	6	3	149	47	+102	105	Promoted to the Midland Football Alliance
2	Black Country Rangers	42	32	6	4	158	62	+96	102	
3	Wolverhampton Casuals	42	25	10	7	100	47	+53	85	
4	Bewdley Town	42	26	6	10	88	53	+35	84	
5	AFC Wulfrunians	42	24	7	11	95	66	+29	79	
6	Wednesfield	42	23	8	11	91	64	+27	77	
7	Dudley Town	42	20	9	13	93	71	+22	69	
8	Cradley Town	42	19	8	15	98	74	+24	65	
9	Goodrich	42	17	11	14	73	68	+5	62	Club folded
10	Shawbury United	42	17	7	18	66	69	−3	58	
11	Wellington	42	17	7	18	79	83	−4	58	
12	Dudley Sports	42	17	7	18	60	82	−22	58	
13	Malvern Town	42	15	10	17	75	81	−6	55	
14	Sporting Khalsa	42	16	3	23	69	106	−37	51	
15	Lye Town	42	13	11	18	60	80	−20	50	
16	Shifnal Town	42	13	9	20	82	88	−6	48	
17	Pegasus Juniors	42	14	6	22	50	68	−18	48	
18	Stafford Town	42	12	10	20	80	101	−21	46	Transferred to the Midland Football Combination
19	Wolverhampton Sporting Community	42	10	12	20	43	63	−20	42	
20	Bustleholme	42	6	5	31	49	102	−53	23	
21	Bromyard Town	42	5	8	29	35	111	−76	23	
22	Darlaston Town	42	4	2	36	41	148	−107	14	

Source: fchd
Rules for classification: 1) points; 2) goal difference; 3) number of goals scored.
