= Hardwicke A.F.C. =

Association football club in England

Hardwicke
- Full name: Hardwicke Association Football Club
- Nickname: Wickey
- Founded: 1933
- Ground: Hardwicke Playing Field, Hardwicke
- Chairman: Dareth Daley
- League: Gloucestershire Northern Senior League Division Two
- 2024–25: Gloucestershire Northern Senior League Division One, 14th of 16 (relegated)

Hardwicke A.F.C. are an amateur football club from Hardwicke, near Gloucester, in Gloucestershire, England. The club was formed in 1933 and currently play in the Gloucestershire Northern Senior League Division Two. The club is affiliated to the Gloucestershire County FA.

== History ==
In the 1960s the first team played in the Northern Senior League, followed by a period in the Stroud & District League. Come the 1980s the club played at Hardwicke Playing Fields and when in 1983–84 the team won the First Division of the Stroud League new changing rooms were built on the end of the Village Hall. This allowed the club to be promoted to the Second Division of the Gloucestershire Northern Senior League.

After four seasons in 1988 the team were promoted to the First Division and consistently finished in the top half of the First Division. In 1998 they were promoted to the Gloucestershire County League. In the 2007–08 season Hardwicke earned promotion to the Hellenic League after winning the County League. Hardwicke made it back-to-back promotions the next season as they won the Hellenic League Western Division and earned promotion to the Premier Division as champions. However, because of ground regulations Hardwicke failed to move to the Premier Division and so decided to resign from the League altogether before the starting of the 2009–10 season.

== Reserve sides ==
The Reserves play in Stroud League Division 2. The 3rd team play in Stroud League Division 3.

== Honours ==
- Hellenic Football League Western Division
  - Champions 2008–09
- Gloucestershire County League
  - Champions 2007–08
- Stroud League
  - Champions 1983–84
