= Blackwood F.C. =

Coordinates: 52.422163°N 1.750276°W

Blackwood
- Full name: Blackwood Football Club
- Founded: 1964
- Dissolved: 2014
- Ground: The Coppice, Shirley, Solihull
- 2013–14: Midland Football Combination; Premier Division, 14th
Home colours

Blackwood F.C. was a football club based in Solihull, West Midlands.

== History ==
Blackwood Football Club was formed in 1964 and played Sunday league football until the club joined the Midland Football Combination Division Three in 2009–10. The club won the league in its first season and was promoted to Division Two. The following year, Blackwood again won the league and gained promotion to Division One. In 2011–12, the club secured its third successive title and was promoted to the Premier Division for 2012–13, the club's first season at level 10 of the English football league system. The club was initially allocated a place in the newly formed Midland Football League in 2014, but subsequently withdrew.

== Ground ==
Blackwood play at The Coppice, Tythe Barn Lane, Shirley, Solihull.

== Honours ==
- Midland Football Combination Division One
  - Champions 2011–12
- Midland Football Combination Division Two
  - Champions 2010–11
- Midland Football Combination Division Three
  - Champions 2009–10
  - Challenge Urn Winners 2009–10
- Festival League Premier Division One
  - Promoted 2008–09
- Festival League Division One
  - Promoted 2007–08
- Festival League Division Two
  - Promoted 2006–07

== Records ==
- FA Vase
  - Second Qualifying Round 2013–14
