= Ascot United F.C. =

Association football club in England

Coordinates: 51°24′54″N 0°39′46″W

Ascot United
- Full name: Ascot United Football Club
- Nickname: The Yellas
- Founded: 1965
- Ground: The Racecourse Ground, Ascot
- Capacity: 1,150
- Chairman: Daniel Birchmore
- Manager: Gavin Smith
- League: Isthmian League South Central Division
- 2025–26: Isthmian League South Central Division, 16th of 22
Home colours	Away colours

Ascot United Football Club is a football club based in Ascot, Berkshire, England. They are currently members of the Isthmian League South Central Division and play at the Racecourse Ground.

== History ==
The club was founded in 1965. In 2001 they joined the Senior Division of the Reading League, going on to win the league in 2006–07. As a result, the club were promoted to Division One East of the Hellenic League. After finishing fourth in their first season, they claimed the runners-up spot in 2008–09 season, earning promotion to the Premier Division. The club made its debut in the FA Vase in the 2010–11 season and the 2011–12 season saw them play in the FA Cup for the first time. Their first match was against Wembley, which was the first-ever FA Cup match streamed live on Facebook. The game also led to Ascot's then-record attendance of 1,149. In 2013–14 the club won the Hellenic League Challenge Cup, defeating Ardley United 2–1 in the final. They won the Hellenic League's Floodlit Cup in 2015–16 with a 2–0 win against Brimscombe & Thrupp in the final.

The 2018–19 season saw Ascot win the Challenge Cup for a second time with a 3–1 win against Windsor in the final. At the end of the season they were transferred to the Premier Division of the Combined Counties League. Following league reorganisation in 2021, the club were placed in the Premier Division North of the league. In 2022–23 they were Premier Division North champions, earning promotion to the South Central Division of the Isthmian League. The club also won the FA Vase, defeating holders Newport Pagnell Town 1–0 in the final at Wembley Stadium.

In 2024–25 Ascot finished fourth in the South Central Division, qualifying for the promotion play-offs, in which they lost 2–1 to Hanworth Villa in the semi-finals.

== Ground ==
The club originally played home matches at Sunninghill, but were given permission by the Ascot Racecourse trustees to build a ground on land to the north of a coach park at the racecourse. A clubhouse was built, which was replaced in 1990, and again in 1992. Floodlights were installed in 1994. The ground now has a capacity of 1,150.

== Honours ==
- FA Vase
  - Winners 2022–23
- Combined Counties League
  - Premier Division North champions 2022–23
- Hellenic League
  - Challenge Cup winners 2013–14, 2018–19
  - Floodlit Cup winners 2015–16
- Reading League
  - Senior Division champions 2006–07
- Reading Evening Post Cup
  - Winners 2005–06

== Records ==
- Best FA Cup performance: Second qualifying round, 2023–24
- Best FA Trophy performance: Third qualifying round, 2023–24, 2024–25
- Best FA Vase performance: Winners, 2022–23
- Record attendance: 1,267 vs Wycombe Wanderers, Berks & Bucks Senior Cup semi-final, 22 March 2022
- Most appearances: George Lock, 325

== See also ==
- Ascot United F.C. players
