= Hungerford Town F.C. =

Association football club in Hungerford, England

Coordinates: 51°24′32″N 1°30′49″W

Hungerford Town
- Full name: Hungerford Town Football Club
- Nickname: The Crusaders
- Founded: 1886
- Ground: Bulpit Lane, Hungerford
- Capacity: 2,500 (170 seated)
- Chairman: Cris Bowden
- Manager: Danny Robinson
- League: Southern League Division One South
- 2025–26: Southern League Premier Division South, 21st of 22 (relegated)
- Website: hungerfordtown.com
Home colours	Away colours

Hungerford Town Football Club is a semi-professional football club based in Hungerford, Berkshire, England. Affiliated to the Berks & Bucks Football Association, they are currently members of and play at Bulpit Lane.

== History ==
The club was established in 1886, initially playing friendlies as there were no local league or cup competitions. After two practice matches in October 1886, the first game against another club was played on 6 November, a 6–2 defeat to Earley. In 1904–05 they won their first honours, the Newbury Challenge Cup, by beating Newbury Union Jack 2–1 in the final. They won the trophy again in 1908–09 with a 2–1 win over Thatcham in the final. The club was now playing in the Hungerford League, but later joined the Newbury League. They won the Newbury League in 1912–13, retaining the title the following season. After World War I the club won the title again in 1919–20 and for a fourth time in 1921–22. They later joined the Swindon & District League.

In 1958 Hungerford moved up to the Premier Division of the Hellenic League. The club won the Hellenic League Benevolent Cup in 1960–61. They finished bottom of the division in 1964–65, resulting in relegation to Division One. In 1970–71 the club won the Division One Cup and the Division One title, earning promotion back to the Premier Division. In 1975–76 and 1976–77 they reached back-to-back finals of the Berks & Bucks Senior Cup, losing to Chesham United and Slough Town respectively. In 1977–78 they won the Hellenic League's Challenge Cup and reached the semi-finals of the FA Vase, eventually losing 3–1 to Barton Rovers in a replay after the original two-legged tie had ended 3–3 on aggregate. Their cup exploits and a third-place finish that season was enough to earn promotion to Division Two of the Isthmian League.

In their first season in the Isthmian League Hungerford reached their third Berks & Bucks Senior Cup final, losing to Wycombe Wanderers. In 1979–80 they reached the first round of the FA Cup for the first time, losing 3–1 to Slough Town in the first round proper. The club also reached the semi-finals of the FA Vase again, this time losing 5–3 to Guisborough Town. In 1981 they were one of four British clubs to compete in the Anglo-Italian Talbot Challenge Cup, which included a 1–0 defeat away to Modena in front of 20,000 fans who had stayed after an Italy under-21 match. The 1981–82 season saw them finally win the Berks & Bucks Senior Cup, beating Wycombe Wanderers 1–0 in the final. Between 1979–80 and 1981–82, they had finished third in the league for three consecutive seasons, missing out on promotion by one place. League restructuring in 1984 led to Hungerford being placed in Division Two South. They again just missed out on promotion in 1984–85, finishing fourth. Another FA Vase semi-final appearance in 1988–89 saw a record attendance of 1,684 in the first leg against Sudbury Town, which finished in a goalless draw. However, they lost 6–0 in the second leg at Sudbury. Further league reorganisation in 1991 saw them return to Division Two.

At the end of the 2002–03 season Hungerford finished fifth in Division Two of the Isthmian League, but dropped back into the Premier Division of the Hellenic League. The club won the Hellenic League's Supplementary Cup in 2004–05 and the Challenge Cup in 2006–07 and 2007–08. They were Premier Division champions in 2008–09, earning promotion to Division One South & West of the Southern League. A fifth-place finish in 2011–12 saw the club qualify for the promotion play-offs, losing 2–1 to Poole Town in the semi-finals. They were Division One South & West runners-up the following season, again qualifying for the play-offs; after beating Paulton Rovers 4–2 in the semi-finals, they defeated Merthyr Town 3–1 in the final to secure promotion to the Premier Division.

The 2014–15 season saw Hungerford finish fourth in the Premier Division. In the subsequent play-offs they lost 1–0 to Truro City in the semi-finals. However, after another fourth-place finish the following season, they defeated Hitchin Town 3–2 in the semi-finals before beating Leamington 2–1 in the final, earning promotion to the National League South. The club finished bottom of the National League South in 2022–23, resulting in relegation to the Premier Division South of the Southern League.

== Ground ==
The club initially played at Hungerford Marsh, before moving to Bulpit Lane after World War I. Floodlights were installed in 1975. The ground currently has a capacity of 2,500, of which 170 is seated.

== Current squad ==
As of 11 August 2026

Note: Flags indicate national team as defined under FIFA eligibility rules; some limited exceptions apply. Players may hold more than one non-FIFA nationality.

Pos.	Nation	Player
DF	ENG	Matthew Berry-Hargreaves
DF	ENG	Jordan Rose
DF	ENG	Ramarni Medford-Smith
MF	ENG	George Smith
FW	POR	Fábio Lopes
MF	ENG	Darnell-Joe Luke

No.	Pos.	Nation	Player
MF	ENG	Cameron Squires	
MF	ENG	Bradley Passey	
DF	ENG	Tyler Blackford	
DF	ENG	Harry Chard	
GK	ENG	Alexander Braidwood	

== Non-playing staff ==
As of 11 August 2026

Position	Staff
Director of Football	Jason Braidwood
First-Team Manager	Danny Robinson
Assistant Manager	Stuart Davis
First-Team Coach	Gareth Thomas
Goalkeeping Coach	Ian Hobbs
Sports Therapist	Emma Hopkinson
Physiotherapist	Georgina Bathe
Kit Manager	Steve Robinson

== Honours ==
- Hellenic League
  - Premier Division champions 2008–09
  - Division One champions 1970–71
  - Division One Cup winners 1970–71
  - Challenge Cup winners 1977–78, 2006–07, 2007–08
  - Supplementary Cup winners 2004–05
  - Benevolent Cup winners 1960–61
- Newbury League
  - Champions 1912–13, 1913–14, 1919–20, 1921–22
- Berks & Bucks Senior Cup
  - Winners 1981–82
- Basingstoke Senior Cup
  - Winners 2012–13, 2014–15
- Linaker Brokers Challenge Cup
  - Winners 2006–07, 2007–08
- Newbury Challenge Cup
  - Winners 1904–05, 1908–09
- Hungerford Cup
  - Winners 2003–04

== Records ==
- Best FA Cup performance: First round, 1979–80
- Best FA Trophy performance: Fifth round, 2022–23
- Best FA Vase performance: Semi-finals, 1977–78, 1979–80, 1988–89
- Record attendance: 1,684 vs Sudbury Town, FA Vase semi-final, 1988–89
- Most goals: Ian Farr, 268
- Record transfer fee paid: £4,000 to Yeovil Town for Joe Scott
- Record Transfer fee received: £3,800 from Barnstaple Town for Joe Scott

== See also ==
- Hungerford Town F.C. players
- Hungerford Town F.C. managers
