= Bicester Town F.C. =

Association football club in England

Coordinates: 51°53′1.1″N 1°11′52.08″W

Bicester Town
- Full name: Bicester Town Football Club
- Nickname: The Foxhunters
- Founded: 1873
- Ground: Bicester Sports Association
- League: Oxfordshire Senior League
Home colours	Away colours

Bicester Town Football Club is a football club based in Bicester, Oxfordshire, England.

== History ==
The club was established in 1873, a merger of Bicester Rovers and Bicester Harriers. They joined the Oxfordshire Senior League after winning the County Shield in 1903. They won the Oxfordshire Senior Cup in 1930 and again in 1939. In 1953 they were founder members of the Hellenic League, finishing as runners-up in its second season. They were placed in the Premier Division when the league gained a second division in 1956, and won the league title in 1960–61.

The club were relegated to Division One after finishing bottom of the Premier Division in 1975–76, but returned to the Premier Division after winning Division One in 1977–78. They went on to win the Premier Division in 1979–80. The 2004–05 season saw the club relegated to Division One East. However, they finished as runners-up the following season, earning promotion back to the Premier Division. They were relegated again at the end of the 2009–10, and despite finishing second in Division One West the following season, folded after a dispute with their landlords.

The club was reformed in 2015, and rejoined the Hellenic League Division One East for the 2015–16 season. They were Division One East runners-up in 2017–18, after which the club were transferred to Division One West. The club resigned from the league shortly after the start of the 2018–19 season. but reformed in 2020 when Bicester United changed their name to Bicester Town Colts and playing in the Oxfordshire Senior League.

== Ground ==
Until World War I the club played at several different grounds; starting at the Cricket Field in 1896 before moving to Banbury Road, then Station Road and London Road. Following the war the club returned to the Cricket Field, before moving to a new ground on Oxford Road that had formerly been used as a golf course. A stand was built in the early 1930s and later extended, with a clubhouse and changing rooms built in 1960s. By 2004 the ground had a capacity of 2,000, with 250 seated; the record attendance was 955, set for a game against Portsmouth in 1994.

A dispute with Bicester Sports Association, the ground's owners, forced the club to fold in 2011. When they reformed in 2015, the club started playing at Ardley United's Playing Fields ground.

== Honours ==
- Hellenic League
  - Premier Division champions 1960–61, 1979–80
  - Division One champions 1977–78
- Oxfordshire Senior Cup
  - Winners 1929–30, 1938–39
- Oxfordshire County Shield
  - Winners 1902–03

== Club records ==
- Best FA Cup performance: First qualifying round, 1950–51, 1952–53, 1954–55 and 1994–95
- Best FA Vase performance: Fourth round, 1978–79
- Record attendance: 955 vs Portsmouth, 1994

== See also ==
- Bicester Town F.C. players
- Bicester Town F.C. managers
