= Banbury United F.C. =

Association football club in Banbury, England

Coordinates: 52°3′24″N 1°19′33″W

Banbury United
- Full name: Banbury United Football Club
- Nickname: The Puritans
- Founded: 1931
- Ground: Spencer Stadium, Banbury
- Capacity: 3,116
- Chairman: Wayne Farrell
- Manager: Craig McKay (interim)
- League: Southern League Premier Division Central
- 2025–26: Southern League Premier Division Central, 12th of 22
- Website: banburyunitedfc.co.uk
Home colours	Away colours

Banbury United Football Club is a football club based in Banbury, Oxfordshire, England. They are currently members of the Southern League Premier Division Central and play at the Spencer Stadium.

== History ==
The club was established in 1931 as Spencer Sports Club, a works team of the Spencer Corsets factory. They initially played friendly matches, with their first match against St John's of the Oxfordshire Junior League played on 29 August 1931 and resulting in an 8–2 win for St John's. In 1933 they joined the Banbury division of the Oxfordshire Junior League, at which point they were renamed Spencer Villa. Later in the season they were renamed Banbury Spencer, and went on to win the league title in their first season. They then joined the Oxfordshire Senior League for the 1934–35 season. After winning the league at the first attempt, they were elected to the Birmingham Combination, also entering a team into the Central Amateur League for the 1935–36 season.

After World War II the club turned professional. The 1947–48 season saw them finish as runners-up in the Combination and reach the first round of the FA Cup for the first time, where they lost 2–1 at Colchester United. In 1954 the Combination folded, with its remaining clubs joining the Birmingham & District League; Banbury were placed in the Southern Division, and after finishing fourth in 1954–55, won a place in Division One for the 1955–56 season. The league was reduced to a single division in 1960, and became the West Midlands (Regional) League in 1962. The 1961–62 season had seen the club reach the FA Cup first round again, this time losing 7–1 at Shrewsbury Town.

In 1965 the club was renamed Banbury United after a change in ownership, and at the end of the 1965–66 season they transferred to Division One of the Southern League. When Division One was split into two divisions in 1971, the club was placed in Division One North. In 1972–73 they reached the first round of the FA Cup for a third time, this time losing 2–0 at home to Barnet. The following season saw them repeat the feat, this time losing 3–2 at Northampton Town in a replay after a 0–0 draw at home.

Banbury were placed in the Southern League's Midland Division in 1979 after league reorganisation, and remained in the division until being relegated to the Premier Division of the Hellenic League at the end of the 1989–90 season. After winning the Premier Division in 1999–2000, Banbury were promoted to Division One East of the Southern League. An eighth-place finish in 2003–04 was enough to be promoted to the Premier Division after the creation of the Conference North and South led to several clubs being moved up a division. The season also saw the club win the Oxfordshire Senior Cup for a fifth time.

In 2014–15 Banbury won the Oxfordshire Senior Cup for a sixth time, defeating North Leigh 4–3 on penalties in the final. However, they were also relegated to Division One South and West at the end of the season. In August 2015, a supporter-led Community Benefit Society took formal control of the club. Their first season in Division One South and West saw them finish as runners-up and qualify for the promotion play-offs. After beating Winchester City 1–0 in the semi-finals, they defeated Taunton Town 2–0 in the final to earn promotion back to the Premier Division. The club were placed in the Premier Central division at the end of the 2017–18 season as part of the restructuring of the non-League pyramid.

The 2020–21 season saw Banbury reach the first round of the FA Cup for the fifth time, going on to lose 2–1 at home to Canvey Island. They reached the first round again the following season, where they were beaten 4–0 at home by Barrow; the season also saw them win the Southern Premier Division Central title, earning promotion to the National League North. However, they were relegated back to the Premier Division Central of the Southern League at the end of the 2023–24 season after finishing third-from-bottom of the National League North.

== Ground ==
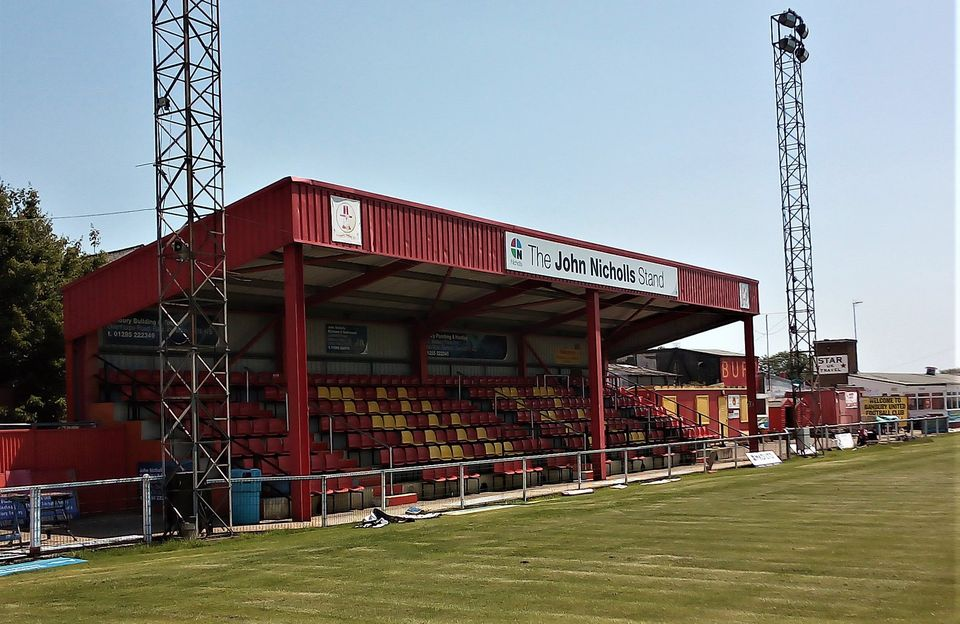
The main stand in 2020

The club has played at the Spencer Stadium on Station Approach since the start of the 1934–35 season, having originally played at Middleton Road. When the club joined the Southern League in 1966, floodlights were installed and a new clubhouse was built to replace the railway carriages that the club had used for changing rooms.

Financial problems led to the ground deteriorating, and the main stand was closed in 1985 before being demolished in 1990. A new stand was built on the north-eastern touchline in the summer of 2000, but towards one end of the pitch rather than near the half-way line. Both ends of the ground had uncovered terracing installed, with the other touchline having terracing along half its length. In April 2023 a new 226-seat stand was installed, taking capacity to 3,116. A new flood defence scheme was completed in 2012 to protect the stadium, the local railway station and nearby housing.

== Honours ==
- Southern League
  - Premier Division Central champions 2021–22
- Hellenic League
  - Premier Division champions 1999–2000
- Oxfordshire Senior League
  - Champions 1934–35
- Oxfordshire Junior League
  - Banbury Division champions 1933–34
- Oxfordshire Senior Cup
  - Winners 1978–79, 1987–88, 2003–04, 2005–06, 2006–07, 2014–15
- Buckingham Charity Cup
  - Winners 2001–02, 2011–12, 2012–13, 2013–14, 2015–16

== Records ==
- Best FA Cup performance: First round 1947–48, 1961–62, 1972–73, 1973–74, 2020–21, 2021–22
- Best FA Trophy performance: Fourth round, 2022–23
- Best FA Vase performance: Second round, 1999–2000
- Biggest win: 12–0 vs RNAS Culham, Oxfordshire Senior Cup, 1945–46
- Heaviest defeat: 11–2 vs West Bromwich Albion 'A', Birmingham Combination, 1938–39
- Record attendance: 7,160 vs Oxford City, FA Cup third qualifying round, 30 October 1948
- Most goals: Dick Pike, 222 (1935–48); Tony Jacques, 222 (1965–76)
- Most appearances: Jody McKay, 576
- Most goals scored in a season: Tony Jacques, 62 in 1967–68
- Record transfer fee paid: £2,000 to Oxford United for Phil Emsden
- Record transfer fee received: £20,000 from Derby County for Kevin Wilson, 1979

== See also ==
- Banbury United F.C. players
- Banbury United F.C. managers
