= Binfield F.C. =

Association football club in England

Coordinates: 51°26′25″N 0°46′32″W

Binfield
- Full name: Binfield Football Club
- Nickname: The Moles
- Founded: 1892
- Ground: Hill Farm Lane, Binfield
- Chairman: Andy Cotton
- Manager: Ross Weatherstone
- League: Isthmian League South Central Division
- 2024–25: Isthmian League South Central Division, 18th of 22
Home colours	Away colours

Binfield Football Club is a football club based in Binfield, near Bracknell, Berkshire, England. Affiliated to the Berks & Bucks Football Association, the club are currently members of the Isthmian League South Central Division and play at Hill Farm Lane. Their nickname is the Moles.

== History ==
The club was established in 1892 by employees at the local brickworks and farm labourers. They initially played in the Ascot & District League, before joining the Great Western Combination in 1946. They won the Combination at the first attempt and finished as runners-up the following season. However, they left the league at the end of the 1950–51 season, joining the Reading & District League.

In 1971–72 the club were promoted from Division One to the Premier Division, but were relegated at the end of the 1973–74 season. They won Division One in 1975–76 to earn promotion back to the Premier Division. However, by the mid-1980s they had been relegated to Division Two. Consecutive Division Two and Division One title-winning seasons in 1986–87 and 1987–88 saw them return to the Premier Division.

In 1989 Binfield transferred to Division One of the Chiltonian League, which they won in their first season, earning promotion to the Premier Division. They finished as Premier Division runners-up in 1991–92 and won the division in 1995–96.

In 2000 the league merged into the Hellenic League, with Binfield placed in Division One East. In 2001 they absorbed junior club Binfield Forest. In 2008–09 they won Division One East and were promoted to the Premier Division. Their second season in the division saw them finish as runners-up. In 2011–12 they won both the Hellenic League Floodlit Cup (beating Shortwood United 2–0 in the final) and the Berks & Bucks Senior Trophy (winning 9–8 on penalties against Abingdon Town after a 1–1 draw). The club won the Floodlit Cup again in 2017–18 with a 2–1 win over Thatcham Town in the final. In 2020–21 they reached the final of the FA Vase for the first time. They were also promoted to the South Central Division of the Isthmian League based on performances over the abandoned 2019–20 and 2020–21 seasons.

== Ground ==
The club played at the Forest Road ground during the mid-20th century, a ground which was shared with the local cricket club. In 1980 they moved to their current ground, Hill Farm Lane. Floodlights were installed in the 2000s.

== Honours ==
- Hellenic League
  - Division One East champions 2008–09
  - Floodlit Cup winners 2011–12, 2017–18
- Chiltonian League
  - Premier Division champions 1995–96
  - Division One champions 1989–90
- Reading & District League
  - Division One champions 1975–76, 1987–88
  - Division Two champions 1986–87
- Great Western Combination
  - Champions 1946–47
- Berks & Bucks Senior Trophy
  - Winners 2011–12
- Fielden Cup
  - Winners 1924

== Records ==
- Best FA Cup performance: Third qualifying round, 2022–23
- Best FA Trophy performance: Second round, 2021–22
- Best FA Vase performance: Runners-up, 2020–21

== See also ==
- Binfield F.C. players
- Binfield F.C. managers
