= Launton Sports F.C. =

Association football club in England

Launton Sports
- Full name: Launton Sports Football Club
- Founded: 1889 (as Launton)
- Ground: Bicester Road, Launton
- Chairman: Oliver Ward (interim)
- Manager: Ash Payne
- Coach: Dave Clark
- League: Oxfordshire Senior League Premier Division
- 2024–25: Oxfordshire Senior League Premier Division, 7th of 14
Home colours

Launton Sports Football Club is a football club based in Launton, near Bicester, England. They are currently members of the Oxfordshire Senior League Premier Division and play at Bicester Road.

== History ==
The club was formed in 1889 and was known as Launton, and played in the Lord Jersey League. The club managed in its first season to play in the Lord Jersey Cup final, though losing 7–0 in their first appearance, to King's Sutton. It was not until the 1912–13 season that the club would win the Lord Jersey Cup, and would go on to win it on several more occasions with the club having to share the Cup in Steeple Aston in the 1920–21 season as both the final and the replay ended 1–1.

Two seasons after sharing the Lord Jersey cup the club won the Oxfordshire Junior Shield in 1924. The club also had more success when 16 seasons later they won the Lord Jersey League in the 1939–40 season. after the war the club experienced two sets of relegation and ended up in the third division. They won the third division in 1952–53 but relegated immediately the following season, waiting until the 1963–64 season to be promoted again as champions.

In 1990 they joined the Oxfordshire Senior League and were division one champions in the 1992–93 season, gaining promotion to the premier division. They missed the 2001–02 season, but returned and in 2006–07 finished third in the Oxfordshire Senior League Premier Division, and were elected to the Hellenic Football League.

For the 2007–08 season, they were members of the Hellenic League Division One West – however, the club were transferred to Division One East for the 2008–09 season, but transferred back again a season later. The resigned from the Hellenic League at the end of the 2010–11 season and returned to the Oxfordshire Senior League.

== Ground ==
Launton Sports play their games at Launton Sports Club, Bicester Road, Launton, OX26 5DP.

== Honours ==
=== League honours ===
- Oxfordshire Senior League Division one :
  - Winners (2): 1992–93, 2001–02
- Lord Jersey League Division One:
  - Winners (1): 1939–40
- Lord Jersey League Division Three:
  - Winners (2): 1952–53, 1963–64

=== Cup honours ===
- Oxfordshire Junior Shield:
  - Winners (1): 1923–24
- Lord Jersey Cup:
  - Winners (6): 1912–13, 1919–20, 1920–21(shared), 1923–24, 1930–31, 1936–37
  - Runners-up(6): 1889–1900, 1910–11, 1921–22, 1926–27, 1927–28, 1935–36

== Club records ==
- Highest League Position: 13th in Hellenic League Division One West 2007–08
