= North Leigh F.C. =

Association football club in North Leigh, England

Coordinates: 51°48′43.49″N 1°25′41.08″W

North Leigh
- Full name: North Leigh Football Club
- Nickname: Millers
- Founded: 1908
- Ground: Eynsham Park, North Leigh
- Capacity: 2,000 (175 seated)
- Chairman: John McDonough
- Manager: Ben Reardon
- League: Combined Counties League Premier Division North
- 2025–26: Combined Counties League Premier Division North, 18th of 20
Home colours	Away colours

North Leigh Football Club is a football club based in North Leigh, Oxfordshire, England. They are currently members of the Combined Counties League Premier Division North and play at the Eynsham Hall Park Sports Ground.

== History ==
The club was established in 1908 and became members of the Witney & District League. They won the Division Two title, the Ted Young Senior Challenge Cup and the Watts Junior Challenge Cup in 1947–48, before winning the Fred Ford Memorial Cup the following season. In 1950–51 the club were champions of the Premier Division. They won the league again in 1952–53 and went on to win it in each of the next four seasons, also winning the Ted Young Senior Challenge Cup in 1951–52, 1953–54, 1954–55 and 1956–57 and the Oxfordshire Junior Shield in 1956–57. The club then moved up to the Oxfordshire Senior League. However, they later returned to the Witney & District League and were Division Two champions in 1968–69.

Another successful spell in the 1980s saw North Leigh win the Witney & District League Premier Division title and the Oxfordshire Junior Shield in 1983–84, before winning five consecutive Premier Division titles between 1985–86 and 1989–90. They then moved up to Division One of the Hellenic League in 1990. In 1992–93 the club were Division One runners-up, earning promotion to the Premier Division. They won the Premier Division title in 2001–02 and 2002–03, but were unable to take promotion as their ground did not meet Southern League requirements. However, after finishing as runners-up in the league 2006–07, the club won the Premier Division, the Hellenic League Shield and the Oxfordshire Senior Cup in 2007–08 and were promoted to Division One South & West of the Southern League.

North Leigh won the Oxfordshire Senior Cup again in 2011–12 and 2016–17. They were transferred to Division One Central of the Southern League at the end of the 2017–18 season. In 2021–22 the club finished sixth, one place outside the promotion play-offs. However, after Welwyn Garden City were disqualified, North Leigh took their place in the play-offs, going on to beat Berkhamsted 2–1 in the semi-finals and Ware 4–2 in the final to earn promotion to the Premier Division South. They finished third-from-bottom of the Premier Division South the following season and were relegated back to Division One Central.

In 2024–25 North Leigh finished bottom of Division One Central and were relegated to the Premier Division North of the Combined Counties League.

== Ground ==
The club play at Eynsham Park, set in the grounds of Eynsham Hall. The ground includes a 175-seat stand named for George Hazell and a covered standing area behind one goal. A record attendance of 426 was set during the 2004–05 season for an FA Cup third qualifying round match against Newport County. A new record of 525 was set for a friendly match against Oxford United in July 2022.

== Honours ==
- Hellenic League
  - Premier Division champions 2001–02, 2002–03, 2007–08
  - League Shield winners 2007–08
- Witney & District League
  - Premier Division champions 1950–51, 1952–53, 1953–54, 1954–55, 1955–56, 1956–57, 1983–84, 1985–86, 1986–87, 1987–88, 1988–89, 1989–90
  - Division Two champions 1947–48, 1968–69
  - Ted Young Senior Challenge Cup winners 1947–48, 1951–52, 1953–54, 1954–55, 1956–57, 1981–82, 1985–86, 1986–87, 1987–88, 1988–89
  - Fred Ford Memorial Cup winners 1948–49, 1949–50, 1950–51, 1954–55, 1955–56, 1956–57
  - George Dingle Memorial Cup winners 1972–73, 1986–87, 1987–88
  - Watts Junior Challenge Cup winners 1947–48
- Oxfordshire Senior Cup
  - Winners 2007–08, 2011–12, 2016–17
- Oxfordshire Charity Cup
  - Winners 1984–85, 1988–89
- Oxfordshire Junior Shield
  - Winners 1956–57 (shared), 1983–84

== Records ==
- Best FA Cup performance: Fourth qualifying round, 2016–17
- Best FA Trophy performance: First round, 2016–17, 2020–21
- Best FA Vase performance: Fourth round, 2003–04
- Record attendance: 525 vs Oxford United, friendly match, 9 July 2022
- Most appearances: P. King
- Most goals: P. Cole

== See also ==
- North Leigh F.C. players
- North Leigh F.C. managers
