= Oxfordshire Senior Football League =

Association football league in England

- Country: England
- Divisions: 5
- Number of clubs: 56
- Level on pyramid: Level 11 (Premier Division)
- Feeder to: Hellenic League
- Promotion to: Hellenic League Division One
- Relegation to: Banbury District and Lord Jersey FA; North Berks Football League; Witney and District League
- Current champions: Yarnton (Premier Division); Abingdon Utd Dev (Division One); Witney Town (Division Two); Longford Park FC Development (Division Three) (2024–25)

The Oxfordshire Senior Football League is an association football competition based in Oxfordshire, England. The league has three divisions; the Premier Division comprising clubs' first teams, whilst the other two divisions are reserve and development sides. The Premier Division is at step 7 of the National League System or level 11 of the overall English football league system. The top club is eligible for promotion to the Hellenic League Division One.

For the 2025–26 season there are 14 clubs competing in all 5 divisions, except for the third level which has only three.

== 2026–27 members ==
=== Premier Division ===
- Abingdon Town
- Chalgrove Cavaliers
- Chinnor
- Cholsey United
- Halse United
- Kennington Athletic
- Launton Sports
- Longford Park
- Milton United
- Shipston Excelsior
- Thame United Reserves
- Witney Town
- Yarnton

=== Division One ===
- Berinsfield
- Bicester Town Colts
- Bletchington
- Garsington
- Graven Hill
- Hanwell United
- Hardwick Sports
- Headington Amateurs
- Kidlington 'A'
- Oakley United
- Sporting Headington Academicals
- Summertown Stars
- Thame United 'A'
- Yarnton Reserves

=== Division Two ===
- Carterton 'A'
- Charlton United
- Chesterton (MBLS)
- Deddington Town
- Dorchester
- Hanney
- Hornton
- Kennington Athletic Reserves
- Kings Sutton
- Long Crendon
- Oxford Blackbirds
- Wallingford & Crowmarsh
- Watlington Town
- Woodstock Town

=== Division Three ===
- Bletchington Development
- Chinnor Reserves
- Drayton
- Glory Farm
- Greater Leys Youth
- Hagbourne
- Launton Sports Reserves
- Longford Park Reserves
- Oxford Irish Athletic
- Quarry Rovers Nomads
- Summertown Stars Reserves
- Thame United 'B'
- Wheatley
- Woodstock Town Reserves

=== Division Four ===
- Bicester Town Colts Development
- Charlton United Reserves
- Chesterton Reserves
- Compton
- Deddington Town Reserves
- Greater Leys Youth Reserves
- Grendon Rangers
- Kingston Colts
- Long Wittenham
- Steventon
- Sutton Courtenay
- Union Street
- Watlington Town Reserves
- Yarnton 'A'

=== Division Five ===
- Benson Lions
- Berinsfield Reserves
- Bicester Park
- Chalgrove Cavaliers Reserves
- Drayton Reserves
- Hagbourne Development
- Letcombe
- Marston Saints
- Oxford Phoenix
- Rose Hill
- Stanford In The Vale
- Steventon Reserves
- Witney Town Development

== Recent champions ==
Season	Premier Division	Division One	Division Two	Division Three
2003–04	Eynsham Association	Rover Cowley		
2004–05	Berinsfield Community Association	Bicester Civil Service Bardwell		
2005–06	Oxford University Press	Kennington United		
2006–07	Garsington	Stonesfield Sports		
2007–08	Rover Cowley	Garsington Reserves	Worcester College Old Boys & Bletchingdon Reserves	—
2008–09	Garsington	Garsington Reserves	Slade Farm United	Freeland Reserves
2009–10	Adderbury Park	AFC Hinksey	Bletchingdon Reserves	Oakley Reserves
2010–11	AFC Hinksey	Slade Farm United	Bletchingdon Reserves	—
2011–12	Oxford University Press	Riverside	Garsington Reserves	AFC Hinksey Reserves
2012–13	Riverside	Oakley United	Bletchingdon Reserves	Mansfield Road Reserves
2013–14	Oakley United	Kidlington Reserves	Middleton Cheney Reserves	Oakley United Reserves
2014–15	Oakley United	Garsington	Oxford University Press Reserves	—
2015–16	Oxford University Press	Blackbird Rovers	Adderbury Park Reserves	—
2016–17	Adderbury Park	Kennington Athletic	Oxford University Press Reserves	—
2017–18	Heyford United	Bicester United	Freeland Reserves	—
2018–19	Freeland	Chesterton	Marston Saints Reserves	—
2019–20	—	—	—	—
2020–21	—	—	—	—
2021–22	Bicester Hallions	Ashton Folly	Cropredy Development	—
2022–23	Adderbury Park	Chalgrove Cavaliers	Yarnton Reserves	—
2023–24	Carterton	Cholsey United	Graven Hill	Summertown Stars reserves
2024–25	Yarnton First	Abingdon Utd FC Development	Witney Town	Longford Park FC Development
