= Woodstock Town F.C. =

Association football club in England

Woodstock Town Football Club
- Full name: Woodstock Town Football Club
- Nickname: The Town
- Founded: 1998
- Stadium: New Road
- Chairman: Neil Roberts
- League: Oxfordshire Senior League
Home colours	Away colours

Woodstock Town Football Club is a football club based in Woodstock, Oxfordshire, England. They are currently members of the Oxford Senior Football League and play at New Road.

== History ==
They were formed in 1998 from a merger of Woodstock Town and Old Woodstock. Woodstock Town was playing in the Witney and District League during the 1911–12, with winning the competition in the same year. In 1950 they joined the Oxfordshire Senior Football League, winning the league eight times until their merger with Old Woodstock. Old woodstock were formed in 1920 and started playing for their first fifty years in the Witney & District league, winning it twice, before being promoted to the Oxfordshire Senior Football League in 1970.

In their first season as a merged club they won the Oxfordshire Senior Football League. This enabled them to join the Hellenic Football League Division One West for the 1999–2000 season. In the season 2007–08 they were runners up in Division One West and were promoted to the Hellenic League Premier Division for the 2008–09 season. The club remained in the Premier Division until the end of the 2010–11 season, when despite finishing 9th they were demoted back to Division One West due to their ground failing to have floodlights. The 2010–11 campaign was also the season that the club made their debut in the FA Cup, making it to the second qualifying round before being knocked out by GE Hamble.

In their first season back in Division One West they finished as Runners-up, but were denied promotion due to their ground still not meeting the required standard for the Hellenic premier league.

The 2012–13 season saw the club reach the third round of the FA Vase, however they never got to contest this game against Colliers Wood United, as the FA expelled them from the competition as their New Road ground did not meet the criteria for this competition, and the club were not allowed to play games in the FA Vase at their old groundshare with North Leigh.

In 2016 the club changed its name from Old Woodstock Town to the present name. In the 2016–17 season they finished bottom of the league with only thirteen points having only won 3 games. However; they were reprieved from relegation. After a better finish the following season, Woodstock Town were amongst the teams forced to take demotion to Division Two due to ground grading (more specifically not having floodlights).

As of the 2019–2020 season, Woodstock were playing in Hellenic League Division Two North where they were third prior to the season being voided.

At the start of the 2023–2024 season, Woodstock Town moved both senior sides playing into the Oxford Senior Football League and junior sides playing in the Oxfordshire Youth Football League.

== Honours ==
- Oxfordshire Senior League
  - Champions 1998–99

== Records ==
- Best FA Cup performance: Second qualifying round 2010–11
- Best FA Vase performance: Fourth round 2011–12
- Record attendance: 258 vs Kidlington 27 August 2001
