= Lydney Town A.F.C. =

Association football club in England

Coordinates: 51°43′22.32″N 2°31′43.52″W

Lydney Town
- Full name: Lydney Town Association Football Club
- Nickname: The Town
- Founded: 1911; 115 years ago
- Ground: Lydney Recreation Ground, Lydney
- Capacity: 700
- Chairman: Neil Hook
- Manager: Vacant
- League: Hellenic League Premier Division
- 2024–25: Hellenic League Premier Division, 18th of 20
- Website: https://web.archive.org/web/20160306052725/http://www.lydneytownafc.co.uk/
Home colours

Lydney Town A.F.C. are a football club based in Lydney, Gloucestershire, England. They are currently member of the Hellenic League Premier Division. The club is affiliated to the Gloucestershire County FA.

== History ==
The club was formed in 1911 and played in local leagues until 1952 when they joined the Gloucestershire Northern Senior League. The club played in this league until 1969, when due to a lack of a committee the club folded, but was reformed again two seasons later. The club won the Senior League Division One Championship in the 1979–80 season and moved to Division One of the Hellenic league for the 1980–81 season. Four seasons later they left the league and rejoined the Gloucestershire Northern Senior League.

In the 2005–06 season, they won the Gloucestershire County League title, earning promotion back into the Hellenic League Division One West for the 2006–07 season. They won Division one west at the first attempt and were promoted to the Premier Division, but were demoted back to Division one a season later due to not having their floodlights operational in time.

== Ground ==
Lydney Town AFC play their home games at:

Lydney Recreation Ground, Swan Road, Lydney, GL15 5RU.

== Honours ==
- Hellenic League Division One West
  - Champions (1): 2006–07
- Gloucestershire County League
  - Champions (1): 2005–06
- Gloucestershire Northern Senior League
  - Champions (1): 1979–80, 2004–05
  - Champions (1): 1977–78, 1978–79

== Current team 2024-2025 ==
Position	Name	Position	Name
GK	Richard Thomas	GK	Adam Cueto
DF	Toby Bendall	DF	Lee Hartshorn
DF	Amadou Lo	DF	Liam Sheppard
DF	Kian Skidmore	DF	Tristan Murphy
DF	Ben Prictor	DF	Shaun Warren
DF	Kevin Davies	MF	Dan Brain
MF	Simon Prangley	MF	Keelan Maguire-Hamblett
MF	Frankie Johnson	MF	Arron Jenkins
MF	Declan Morley-Lyne	MF	Jordan Sheen
MF	Shay Potts	MF	Thomas Rush
MF	Dave Jenkins	MF	Alex Long
MF	Billy Guest	CF	Lewis Thompson (C)
CF	Dillan Campbell	CF	..
