= 2022–23 FA Vase =

Football Association Vase

Tournament details
- Country: England; Wales; Jersey; Isle of Man
- Dates: Qualifying: 26 August 2022 – 24 September 2022; Competition Proper: 22 October 2022 – 21 May 2023
- Teams: Total: 586

Final positions
- Champions: Ascot United (1st title)
- Runners-up: Newport Pagnell Town

The 2022–23 FA Vase (known for sponsorship reasons as the Isuzu FA Vase) was the 49th season of the FA Vase, an annual football competition for teams playing in levels 9 and 10 (steps 5 & 6) of the English National League System.

The defending champions were Newport Pagnell Town, who reached their second consecutive final, but were beaten 1-0 by Ascot United.

== Calendar ==
Round	Main date	Number of fixtures	Clubs remaining	New entries this round	Prize money winners	Prize money losers
First round qualifying	Saturday 27 August 2022	176	586 → 410	352	£550	£160
Second round qualifying	Saturday 24 September 2022	179	410 → 231	182	£725	£225
First round proper	Saturday 22 October 2022	103	231 → 128	27	£825	£250
Second round proper	Saturday 12 November 2022	64	128 → 64	25	£900	£275
Third round proper	Saturday 3 December 2022	32	64 → 32	None	£1,125	£350
Fourth round proper	Saturday 14 January 2023	16	32 → 16	None	£1,875	£600
Fifth round proper	Saturday 11 February 2023	8	16 → 8	None	£2,250	£725
Quarter-finals	Saturday 11 March 2023	4	8 → 4	None	£4,125	£1,350
Semi-finals	Saturday 1 April 2023	2	4 → 2	None	£5,500	£1,725
Final	Sunday 21 May 2023	1	2 → 1	None	£30,000	£15,000

== First qualifying round ==
The draw for the first qualifying round was made on 8 July 2022.

Tie	Home team (tier)	Score	Away team (tier)	Att.
Friday 26 August 2022
12	Seaham Red Star (9)	4–1	Redcar Athletic (9)	202
25	Emley AFC (9)	2–2 (4–3 p)	Avro (9)	233
35	Northwich Victoria (9)	3–4	Cheadle Town (10)	219
46	Shifnal Town (9)	0–0 (3–2 p)	Market Drayton Town (9)	248
49	Hinckley (10)	3–1	Paget Rangers (10)	182
57	Selston (9)	1–3	Blidworth Welfare (10)	138
67	Histon (9)	6–2	Debenham LC (10)	156
75	Woodford Town (9)	5–0	Haverhill Borough (10)	272
84	Stansted (9)	4–1	Hoddesdon Town (9)	113
85	West Essex (9)	0–0 (5–3 p)	Harwich & Parkeston (10)	79
98	Langley (10)	6–1	Chalfont St Peter (9)	102
127	Lingfield (9)	2–3	Shoreham (10)	52
162	Fawley (10)	5–5 (3–1 p)	Wincanton Town (10)	109
163	Christchurch (9)	1–2	Bournemouth (9)	241
Saturday 27 August 2022
1	Blyth Town	0–1	Barnoldswick Town (9)	72
2	Northallerton Town (9)	2–1	Chester-le-Street Town (10)	129
3	Eccleshill United (9)	9–1	Willington (10)	57
4	Squires Gate (9)	2–1	Easington Colliery (10)	62
5	Jarrow (10)	0–4	Whickham (9)	117
6	Padiham (9)	1–0	Carlisle City (9)	91
7	Washington (10)	1–6	Guisborough Town (9)	126
8	Tow Law Town (9)	0–1	Bedlington Terriers (10)	89
9	Ashington (9)	4–6	Billingham Town (10)	324
10	Penrith (9)	1–3	Horden Community Welfare (10)	133
11	Birtley Town (10)	2–1	Ilkley Town (10)	258
13	Silsden (9)	5–0	Garstang (10)	105
14	Chester-le-Street United (10)	1–3	Newcastle University (10)	141
15	Thackley (9)	2–0	Boldon CA (10)	92
16	Newton Aycliffe (9)	1–0	Esh Winning (10)	162
17	Redcar Town (10)	1–2	Pickering Town (9)	112
18	Crook Town (9)	1–4	West Auckland Town (9)	272
19	Yorkshire Amateur (9)	1–6	Longridge Town (9)	64
20	Litherland REMYCA (9)	2–0	Staveley MW (9)	69
21	Chadderton (10)	2–4	Frickley Athletic (9)	139
22	Lower Breck (9)	3–3 (4–3 p)	Daisy Hill (10)	58
23	Hall Road Rangers	w/o	Glasshoughton Welfare (10)	NA
Walkover for Glasshoughton Welfare – Hall Road Rangers removed from the competition
24	Charnock Richard (9)	8–0	Bottesford Town (9)	112
26	FC St Helens (10)	1–1 (7–6 p)	North Ferriby (9)	116
27	Rossington Main (10)	6–0	Parkgate (10)	140
28	New Mills (10)	2–1	Atherton LR (10)	120
29	Brigg Town (10)	3–1	Runcorn Town (10)	279
30	West Didsbury & Chorlton (9)	3–1	Ashton Town (10)	476
31	Burscough (9)	3–3 (1–3 p)	Bacup Borough (10)	113
32	Wythenshawe Amateurs (10)	1–1 (3–4 p)	Cammell Laird 1907 (10)	160
33	Nostell Miners Welfare (10)	3–1	Dronfield Town (10)	77
34	Swallownest (10)	0–5	Vauxhall Motors (9)	72
37	Handsworth (9)	3–0	Goole (9)	163
38	Abbey Hulton United (10)	4–1	Khalsa Football Federation (10)	61
39	Lichfield City (9)	4–0	Bewdley Town (9)	106
40	Eccleshall (10)	2–1	Rugby Borough (10)	57
41	Coventry Copsewood (10)	0–2	Nuneaton Griff (10)	58
42	Lye Town (9)	2–2 (5–3 p)	Ellesmere Rangers (10)	67
43	Bilston Town (10)	0–1	Racing Club Warwick (9)	185
44	Brocton (10)	4–2	Coton Green (10)	90
45	Hereford Pegasus (9)	2–1	Chelmsley Town (9)	54
47	Pershore Town (10)	w/o	Littleton (10)	NA
Walkover for Pershore Town – Littleton withdrawn from the competition
48	Shawbury United (10)	0–1	Westfields (9)	32
50	FC Stratford (10)	0–3	Darlaston Town (1874) (9)	81
51	Haughmond (10)	1–1 (4–3 p)	Winsford United (9)	189
52	Ashby Ivanhoe (10)	1–0	Malvern Town (9)	153
53	Harrowby United (10)	1–3	Lutterworth Town (9)	85
54	Heanor Town (9)	1–1 (3–4 p)	Deeping Rangers (9)	77
55	Saffron Dynamo (10)	2–2	Ingles (10)	75
Tie replayed after the referee proceeded to play extra-time when they should have gone straight to penalties
56	Sherwood Colliery (9)	5–1	Barrow Town (10)	60
58	Bourne Town (10)	3–1	Clipstone (10)	124
59	Quorn (9)	5–2	Clifton All Whites (10)	144
60	Lutterworth Athletic (10)	1–2	Melton Town (9)	143
61	Pinchbeck United (9)	4–1	Holbeach United (10)	117
62	Rainworth MW (10)	1–2	Blackstones (10)	45
63	Skegness Town (9)	1–1 (4–2 p)	AFC Mansfield (9)	98
64	Radford (10)	0–0 (3–1 p)	Boston Town (9)	73
65	Kimberley MW (9)	3–0	Hucknall Town (10)	207
66	Swaffham Town (10)	1–3	Newmarket Town (9)	109
68	Godmanchester Rovers (9)	3–2	Thetford Town (9)	120
69	Framlingham Town (10)	0–5	Norwich United (9)	71
70	Downham Town (10)	3–2	Soham Town Rangers (9)	80
71	March Town United (9)	2–1	Huntingdon Town (10)	163
72	Whitton United (9)	1–1 (4–5 p)	Newbury Forest (10)	24
73	Holland (10)	0–1	Letchworth Garden City Eagles (10)	54
74	Sawbridgeworth Town (9)	1–1 (4–2 p)	St. Margaretsbury (10)	77
76	Romford (9)	1–0	Potton United (9)	80
77	Cornard United (10)	5–1	Haverhill Rovers (9)	58
78	Frenford (10)	1–4	FC Clacton (9)	63
79	Enfield (9)	2–0	Hadleigh United (9)	100
80	Takeley (9)	1–2	Stanway Rovers (9)	75
81	Biggleswade United (9)	3–2	Southend Manor (9)	88
82	Baldock Town (9)	4–3	Ipswich Wanderers (9)	78
83	Ilford (9)	0–0 (4–2 p)	Cockfosters (9)	85
87	Redbridge (9)	4–1	Enfield Borough (10)	46

Tie	Home team (tier)	Score	Away team (tier)	Att.
88	Brantham Athletic (9)	1–2	Basildon Town (10)	88
89	Leighton Town (9)	6–1	London Tigers (10)	281
90	Edgware & Kingsbury (9)	2–2 (5–4 p)	Leverstock Green (9)	41
91	Burnham (9)	4–6	London Samurai Rovers (10)	69
92	Milton Keynes Irish (9)	1–0	Arlesey Town (9)	89
93	Harefield United (9)	4–1	London Colney	40
94	Northampton ON Chenecks (10)	7–0	Buckingham Athletic (10)	31
96	Hilltop (9)	4–0	Amersham Town (10)	65
97	Wellingborough Town (9)	2–1	Bugbrooke St Michaels (9)	120
99	Aylesbury Vale Dynamos (9)	5–1	Rushden & Higham United (10)	79
100	Oxhey Jets (9)	3–0	Easington Sports (9)	53
101	Flackwell Heath (9)	2–2 (4–5 p)	Risborough Rangers (9)	154
102	Cogenhoe United (9)	3–2	Rothwell Corinthians (9)	45
104	Ardley United (9)	1–4	North Greenford United (9)	110
106	Broadfields United (9)	2–0	Desborough Town (9)	24
107	Milton United (10)	2–2 (4–1 p)	Longwell Green Sports (10)	79
108	Roman Glass St George (9)	1–1 (8–7 p)	Fairford Town (9)	40
109	Wantage Town (9)	1–0	Tytherington Rocks (10)	73
110	Brimscombe & Thrupp (9)	4–0	AFC Aldermaston (10)	70
111	Stonehouse Town (10)	0–1	Hallen (10)	88
112	Portishead Town (9)	0–0 (4–3 p)	Shrivenham (9)	47
113	Shortwood United (10)	0–2	Calne Town (10)	41
114	Longlevens (9)	2–4	Reading City (9)	35
115	Virginia Water (9)	0–2	Tadley Calleva (9)	52
116	Bitton (9)	4–1	Wokingham & Emmbrook (9)	103
118	Hartpury University (10)	3–2	Malmesbury Victoria (10)	46
119	Woodley United (10)	2–3	Cadbury Heath (9)	36
120	Ashton & Backwell United (9)	2–1	Knaphill	109
121	Clanfield (10)	3–1	Bristol Telephones (10)	76
122	Corsham Town (9)	3–1	Cove (10)	80
123	Long Crendon (10)	1–5	Ascot United (9)	35
124	Moreton Rangers (10)	1–3	Brislington (10)	43
125	Erith Town (9)	6–0	Loxwood (9)	52
126	Alfold (9)	1–3	Deal Town (9)	70
128	Clapton (9)	P–P	Punjab United (9)	NA
129	Fisher (9)	3–2	Oakwood (10)	112
130	AFC Varndeanians (9)	1–4	Jersey Bulls (9)	125
131	Staplehurst Monarchs (10)	2–2 (2–4 p)	Pagham (10)	87
132	Steyning Town (9)	0–1	Little Common (9)	103
133	Westside (10)	1–1 (4–3 p)	Whitstable Town (9)	52
134	East Preston (10)	0–9	Erith & Belvedere (9)	99
135	Selsey (10)	0–5	Eastbourne United (9)	152
136	Tooting Bec (10)	1–0	Sporting Club Thamesmead (10)	42
137	Banstead Athletic (9)	2–4	AFC Croydon Athletic (9)	21
138	Mile Oak (10)	1–3	Welling Town (9)	65
139	Saltdean United (9)	1–6	Kennington (9)	76
140	Wick (10)	1–3	AFC Whyteleafe (10)	99
141	Redhill (9)	2–1	Epsom & Ewell (9)	128
142	Hailsham Town (10)	0–0 (4–5 p)	Newhaven (9)	95
143	Midhurst & Easebourne (9)	1–1 (4–2 p)	Greenways (10)	48
144	Faversham Strike Force (10)	0–2	Horsham YMCA (9)	74
145	Lordswood (9)	0–2	Crowborough Athletic (9)	87
146	Cobham (9)	1–2	Lydd Town (10)	68
148	Kent Football United (10)	w/o	Sutton Athletic (9)	NA
Walkover for Sutton Athletic – Kent Football United withdrawn from the competition
149	Worthing United (10)	1–3	Forest Hill Park (10)	37
150	AFC Uckfield Town (9)	1–3	Peacehaven & Telscombe (9)	54
151	Sporting Bengal United (9)	2–0	Seaford Town (10)	40
152	FC Elmstead (10)	2–2 (3–0 p)	Barking (9)	51
153	Lewisham Borough (10)	1–3	Broadbridge Heath (9)	28
154	Godalming Town (10)	4–3	Alresford Town (9)	77
155	Horndean (9)	4–1	Alton (9)	115
156	Sherborne Town (9)	2–2 (2–3 p)	Andover New Street (10)	92
157	Ringwood Town (10)	2–2 (4–5 p)	Andover Town (10)	82
158	Downton (10)	0–3	Bemerton Heath Harlequins (9)	150
159	Newport (IOW) (10)	0–0 (4–3 p)	Warminster Town (10)	101
160	Folland Sports (10)	1–1 (2–4 p)	Shaftesbury (9)	54
161	Hythe & Dibden (9)	7–1	Hamble Club (9)	86
164	Badshot Lea (9)	2–1	Baffins Milton Rovers (9)	71
165	Ash United (10)	0–3	Petersfield Town (10)	60
166	Fareham Town (9)	5–0	Romsey Town (10)	191
167	Radstock Town (10)	2–4	Newton Abbot Spurs (10)	91
168	Elmore (10)	2–4	St Blazey (10)	154
169	Dobwalls (10)	1–5	Elburton Villa (10)	48
170	Bodmin Town (10)	0–1	Odd Down (10)	42
171	Bovey Tracey (10)	5–0	Newquay (10)	107
172	Cheddar (10)	2–4	Crediton United (10)	73
173	Wadebridge Town (10)	0–1	Cullompton Rangers (10)	101
174	Falmouth Town (9)	3–1	AFC St Austell (10)	260
175	Camelford (10)	3–2	Ilfracombe Town (9)	62
176	Godolphin Atlantic (10)	0–10	Barnstaple Town (9)	68
Sunday 28 August 2022
36	Hallam (9)	3–2	Ashton Athletic (9)	373
86	May & Baker (10)	2–2 (4–2 p)	Stotfold (9)	61
95	FC Deportivo Galicia (10)	3–1	Wellingborough Whitworth (10)	76
103	Burton Park Wanderers (10)	0–1	Penn & Tylers Green (10)	113
105	Dunstable Town (9)	2–0	Crawley Green (9)	260
117	Sandhurst Town (10)	1–2	Sheerwater (9)	113
147	Canterbury City (9)	1–2	Phoenix Sports (9)	96
Tuesday 6 September 2022
128	Clapton (9)	0–1	Punjab United (9)	80
Played at Elite Venue, Gravesend, Kent.
Thursday 8 September 2022
55	Saffron Dynamo (10)	0–3	Ingles (10)	89

== Second qualifying round ==
The draw for the second qualifying round was also made on 8 July 2022.

Tie	Home team (tier)	Score	Away team (tier)	Att.
Friday 23 September 2022
47	Hinckley (10)	1–0	Stafford Town (10)	158
56	Blidworth Welfare (10)	2–5	Ollerton Town (10)	121
75	May & Baker (10)	1–1 (4–2 p)	Colney Heath (9)	77
79	Stansted (9)	4–1	Langford (10)	126
88	Woodford Town (9)	2–2 (4–2 p)	Stanway Rovers (9)	111
97	London Samurai Rovers (10)	1–0	Wembley (9)	54
125	Cribbs (9)	4–0	Portishead Town (10)	316
Saturday 24 September 2022
1	Cleator Moor Celtic (10)	0–2	Eccleshill United (9)	127
2	Heaton Stannington (9)	0–2	Campion (10)	416
3	Brandon United (10)	3–1	Pickering Town (9)	94
4	Kendal Town (9)	3–1	Guisborough Town (9)	131
5	Sunderland RCA (9)	2–3	Bishop Auckland (9)	203
6	West Allotment Celtic (9)	2–2 (5–6 p)	Squires Gate (9)	105
7	Bedlington Terriers (10)	1–3	Newcastle University (10)	158
8	Harrogate Railway Athletic (10)	1–1 (5–3 p)	Silsden (9)	129
9	Horden Community Welfare (10)	3–3 (3–2 p)	Steeton (10)	150
10	Northallerton Town (9)	2–4	Longridge Town (9)	152
11	AFC Blackpool (10)	0–3	Barnoldswick Town (9)	107
12	Whitley Bay (9)	4–1	Ryton & Crawcrook Albion (10)	462
13	Thornaby (9)	2–0	Garforth Town (9)	129
14	Birtley Town (10)	1–1 (2–4 p)	Newton Aycliffe (9)	432
15	Billingham Town (10)	1–1 (5–4 p)	Sunderland West End (10)	170
17	Padiham (9)	0–1	Holker Old Boys (10)	222
18	Seaham Red Star (9)	1–1 (4–2 p)	West Auckland Town (9)	246
19	Knaresborough Town (9)	1–2	Thackley (9)	136
20	Cammell Laird 1907 (10)	1–1 (3–1 p)	Retford (10)	102
21	Vauxhall Motors (9)	1–1 (1–4 p)	Emley (9)	195
22	Cheadle Heath Nomads (10)	0–6	Winterton Rangers (9)	53
23	Bacup Borough (10)	1–0	Stockport Town (10)	207
24	South Liverpool (10)	1–2	Hallam (9)	110
25	Litherland REMYCA (9)	3–2	Charnock Richard (9)	84
Litherland REMYCA disqualified for fielding an ineligible player
26	Darwen FC (10)	2–0	Handsworth (9)	116
27	Barnton (10)	1–2	Golcar United (9)	286
28	Frickley Athletic (9)	2–1	Irlam (9)	195
29	Cheadle Town (10)	3–2	Maltby Main (9)	107
30	FC Isle of Man (9)	3–1	Lower Breck (9)	545
31	Athersley Recreation (9)	0–2	Armthorpe Welfare (10)	90
32	Selby Town (9)	2–1	Glasshoughton Welfare (10)	201
33	West Didsbury & Chorlton (9)	2–1	Nostell MW (10)	577
34	New Mills (10)	0–3	Brigg Town (10)	175
35	FC St Helens (10)	2–1	Rossington Main (10)	106
36	Maine Road (10)	1–1 (3–4 p)	Penistone Church (9)	127
37	Ashby Ivanhoe (10)	2–0	Rocester (10)	110
38	Tividale (9)	1–0	Abbey Hulton United (10)	101
39	Racing Club Warwick (9)	3–1	Alsager Town (10)	229
40	Cradley Town (10)	0–3	Brocton (10)	52
41	Darlaston Town (1874) (9)	1–4	Romulus (9)	141
43	Hereford Pegasus (9)	0–1	Stone Old Alleynians (9)	55
44	Hereford Lads Club (9)	3–3 (2–3 p)	Eccleshall (10)	113
45	Lye Town (9)	2–0	Haughmond (10)	68
46	Heather St John's (9)	1–3	Wolverhampton Casuals (9)	49
48	Pershore Town (10)	8–0	AFC Bridgnorth (10)	117
49	Studley (9)	0–0 (4–5 p)	Stapenhill (10)	61
50	Nuneaton Griff (10)	0–3	Shifnal Town (9)	69
51	Worcester City (9)	1–0	Lichfield City (9)	346
52	AFC Wulfrunians (9)	6–1	Heath Hayes (10)	135
53	Birstall United (10)	4–1	Holwell Sports (10)	80
54	Newark & Sherwood United (9)	0–0 (4–1 p)	Sleaford Town (9)	201
55	Ingles (10)	1–2	Dunkirk (10)	86
57	St Andrews (10)	0–4	Bourne Town (10)	45
58	Skegness Town (9)	1–5	Quorn (9)	103
59	Radford (10)	1–1 (5–4 p)	Aylestone Park (10)	105
60	Shirebrook Town (10)	3–0	Leicester Nirvana (9)	110
61	Pinchbeck United (9)	3–0	Deeping Rangers (9)	132
62	Sherwood Colliery (9)	2–2 (5–3 p)	Lutterworth Town (9)	64
63	Gedling MW (10)	1–1 (4–5 p)	Belper United (9)	67
64	Blackstones (10)	1–1 (6–5 p)	Kirby Muxloe (10)	160
65	Melton Town (9)	1–3	Kimberley Miners Welfare (9)	181
66	Mildenhall Town (9)	1–1 (2–4 p)	Ely City (9)	132
67	Kirkley & Pakefield (9)	1–1 (3–4 p)	Downham Town (10)	71
68	Godmanchester Rovers (9)	1–0	Walsham-le-Willows (9)	112
69	Wisbech Town (9)	1–1 (3–2 p)	Eynesbury Rovers (9)	140
70	Norwich United (9)	4–1	March Town United (9)	87
71	Diss Town (10)	2–2 (7–6 p)	Histon (9)	98
72	Newmarket Town (9)	3–2	Great Yarmouth Town (10)	70
73	FC Parson Drove (10)	2–7	Norwich CBS (10)	65
74	Mulbarton Wanderers (9)	2–2 (3–4 p)	Sheringham (9)	74
77	Cornard United (10)	0–3	Burnham Ramblers (10)	43
78	Basildon Town (10)	0–0 (4–2 p)	FC Clacton (9)	81
80	Long Melford (9)	1–3	Baldock Town (9)	80
81	Enfield (9)	3–0	Hackney Wick (10)	119
82	Halstead Town (9)	2–4	Sawbridgeworth Town (9)	152
83	Romford (9)	3–2	West Essex (9)	95
84	Little Oakley (9)	1–1 (4–2 p)	Park View (10)	68
85	Ilford (9)	0–0 (3–4 p)	Wormley Rovers (10)	91
86	Biggleswade United (9)	3–0	White Ensign (9)	71
89	St. Panteleimon (9)	4–0	Letchworth Garden City Eagles (10)	27
90	Redbridge (9)	5–1	Wivenhoe Town (10)	54
91	CB Hounslow United (10)	1–1 (3–4 p)	Holyport (9)	96
92	Windsor (9)	0–2	Harefield United (9)	154

Tie	Home team (tier)	Score	Away team (tier)	Att.
93	Long Buckby (9)	0–3	Bedfont (10)	43
94	Risborough Rangers (9)	2–3	Edgware & Kingsbury (9)	82
95	British Airways (10)	3–1	Ampthill Town (10)	52
96	Brook House (10)	2–0	Winslow United (10)	55
98	Dunstable Town (9)	4–0	Holmer Green (10)	266
99	Leighton Town (9)	5–0	Hilltop (9)	410
100	Oxhey Jets (9)	3–0	Penn & Tylers Green (10)	62
101	Broadfields United (9)	2–3	North Greenford United (9)	72
102	Chalfont St Peter (9)	2–4	Rayners Lane (10)	92
103	Aylesbury Vale Dynamos (9)	0–0 (5–4 p)	Milton Keynes Irish (9)	113
104	FC Deportivo Galicia (10)	0–4	Wellingborough Town (9)	37
105	Northampton Sileby Rangers (10)	3–1	Hillingdon Borough (10)	44
106	Cogenhoe United (9)	2–0	Raunds Town (10)	72
107	Harpenden Town (9)	1–0	Northampton ON Chenecks (10)	121
108	Rising Ballers Kensington (10)	2–0	Spelthorne Sports (9)	48
109	Oldland Abbotonians (10)	3–1	Almondsbury (10)	52
110	Cheltenham Saracens (10)	2–2 (4–3 p)	Hallen (10)	58
111	Hengrove Athletic (10)	1–5	Lydney Town (9)	52
112	Cadbury Heath (9)	1–1 (2–4 p)	Roman Glass St George (9)	72
113	Mangotsfield United (9)	2–0	Abingdon United (10)	119
114	Newent Town (10)	1–0	Chipping Sodbury Town (9)	125
115	Wantage Town (9)	0–1	Fleet Town (9)	119
116	Ascot United (9)	10–1	AEK Boco (10)	103
117	Milton United (10)	1–1 (4–3 p)	Reading City (9)	67
118	Hartpury University (10)	0–0 (4–2 p)	Clanfield (10)	79
119	Brislington (10)	2–2 (5–6 p)	Corsham Town (9)	129
120	Bitton (9)	1–2	Eversley & California (10)	63
121	Sheerwater (9)	1–1 (1–4 p)	Brimscombe & Thrupp (9)	71
122	Calne Town (10)	2–2 (4–5 p)	Tadley Calleva (9)	83
123	Bagshot (10)	2–3	Thornbury Town (9)	32
124	Ashton & Backwell United (9)	2–1	Camberley Town (9)	131
126	Tuffley Rovers (9)	1–1 (4–2 p)	Fleet Spurs (10)	74
127	Snodland Town (10)	1–1 (4–3 p)	Sutton Athletic (9)	215
129	Horley Town (9)	1–1 (5–4 p)	Holmesdale (9)	85
130	Shoreham (10)	0–1	Jersey Bulls (9)	304
131	Bearsted (9)	2–1	Arundel (10)	88
132	Erith Town (9)	4–0	Rochester United (10)	72
133	Roffey (9)	1–3	Montpelier Villa (10)	38
135	Little Common (9)	3–0	Molesey (10)	51
136	Bexhill United (9)	1–0	Horsham YMCA (9)	102
137	AFC Croydon Athletic (9)	2–2 (3–4 p)	AFC Whyteleafe (10)	110
138	FC Elmstead (10)	1–1 (3–4 p)	Deal Town (9)	41
139	Newhaven (9)	2–3	Eastbourne Town (9)	304
140	Balham (9)	0–0 (0–3 p)	Colliers Wood United (9)	89
141	K Sports (9)	2–2 (3–5 p)	Rusthall (9)	68
142	Bridon Ropes (10)	1–4	Phoenix Sports (9)	75
143	Tooting Bec (10)	5–0	Billingshurst (10)	35
144	Crowborough Athletic (9)	3–0	Midhurst & Easebourne (9)	120
145	Lydd Town (10)	2–1	Hollands & Blair (9)	97
146	Chessington & Hook United (10)	2–1	Hassocks (9)	113
147	Forest Hill Park (10)	0–2	Fisher (9)	85
148	Pagham (9)	2–0	Eastbourne United (9)	72
149	Croydon (10)	0–0 (2–4 p)	Redhill (9)	101
150	Broadbridge Heath (9)	3–1	Erith & Belvedere (9)	246
151	Sporting Bengal United (9)	4–0	Westside (10)	25
152	Peacehaven & Telscombe (9)	3–1	Welling Town (9)	169
153	Godalming Town (10)	1–2	Blackfield & Langley (9)	145
154	Laverstock & Ford (9)	4–2	Andover Town (10)	146
155	Cowes Sports (9)	2–1	Verwood Town (10)	146
156	Bridport (10)	2–0	Petersfield Town (10)	180
157	AFC Stoneham (9)	6–1	United Services Portsmouth (9)	15
158	Newport (IOW) (10)	4–0	Amesbury Town (10)	90
159	Andover New Street (10)	3–2	Fawley (10)	91
160	Badshot Lea (9)	1–1 (3–5 p)	Shaftesbury (9)	139
161	Bradford Town (9)	0–0 (4–2 p)	Fareham Town (9)	118
162	Bournemouth (9)	2–5	Horndean (9)	105
163	East Cowes Victoria Athletic (10)	1–8	AFC Portchester (9)	141
164	Portland United (9)	3–1	Hythe & Dibden (9)	115
165	Whitchurch United (10)	2–2 (4–3 p)	Moneyfields (9)	77
166	Fleetlands (10)	0–3	Bemerton Heath Harlequins (9)	134
167	Torpoint Athletic (9)	7–0	Wendron United (10)	147
168	Shepton Mallet (9)	1–5	Mousehole (9)	221
169	Elburton Villa (10)	2–0	Torrington (10)	46
170	Bovey Tracey (10)	1–0	Welton Rovers (10)	111
171	Sidmouth Town (10)	0–6	Crediton United (10)	67
172	Callington Town (10)	1–3	Cullompton Rangers (10)	62
173	Helston Athletic (9)	2–1	Saltash United (9)	147
174	Millbrook (9)	2–5	Ivybridge Town (10)	58
175	Camelford (10)	0–6	St Blazey (10)	85
176	Odd Down (10)	2–2 (5–4 p)	Newton Abbot Spurs (10)	50
177	Bishops Lydeard (10)	3–1	Liskeard Athletic (10)	65
178	Barnstaple Town (9)	4–0	Axminster Town (10)	147
179	Falmouth Town (9)	5–0	Launceston (10)	320
Sunday 25 September 2022
16	Albion Sports (9)	3–4	Whickham (9)	130
42	Worcester Raiders (9)	1–2	Westfields (9)	208
76	Benfleet (10)	3–1	Newbury Forest (10)	62
87	Barkingside (10)	0–0 (5–3 p)	Coggeshall United (10)	105
134	Kennington (9)	2–0	Punjab United (9)	165
Tuesday 27 September 2022
128	Larkfield & New Hythe Wanderers (10)	4–0	Meridian VP (10)	55

== First round proper ==
The draw for the first round proper was made on 26 September 2022.

Tie	Home team (tier)	Score	Away team (tier)	Att.
Friday 21 October 2022
54	Woodford Town (9)	3–3 (4–2 p)	Sawbridgeworth Town (9)	131
Saturday 22 October 2022
1	Whitley Bay (9)	4–2	Billingham Synthonia (10)	392
2	Newcastle Benfield (9)	4–0	Newton Aycliffe (9)	165
3	Seaham Red Star (9)	1–2	Eccleshill United (9)	85
5	Squires Gate (9)	2–1	Cammell Laird 1907 (10)	75
6	Barnoldswick Town (9)	5–4	Selby Town (10)	160
7	Billingham Town (10)	1–4	FC Isle of Man (9)	222
8	Barton Town (9)	2–4	Cheadle Town (10)	220
9	West Didsbury & Chorlton (9)	2–1	Golcar United (9)	720
10	Kendal Town (9)	3–4	Longridge Town (9)	224
11	Brandon United (10)	2–3	Thackley (9)	132
12	Brigg Town (10)	2–0	Harrogate Railway Athletic (10)	226
13	Newcastle University (10)	2–5	Hallam (9)	64
14	Frickley Athletic (9)	1–3	Emley (9)	256
15	Holker Old Boys (10)	3–1	Whickham (9)	80
16	FC St Helens (10)	2–1	Penistone Church (9)	172
17	Darwen FC (10)	3–2	Charnock Richard (9)	124
18	Campion (10)	1–3	Bacup Borough (10)	105
19	Horden Community Welfare (10)	3–0	Armthorpe Welfare (10)	158
20	Thornaby (9)	2–2 (5–4 p)	Pilkington (10)	134
21	Winterton Rangers (9)	1–2	Prestwich Heys (9)	146
22	Pershore Town (10)	1–2	Atherstone Town (9)	264
23	Stourport Swifts (9)	4–2	Shifnal Town (9)	111
24	Newark & Sherwood United (9)	3–0	Ashby Ivanhoe (10)	252
26	Westfields (9)	0–1	Ollerton Town (10)	137
27	Hinckley (10)	4–1	Cogenhoe United (9)	207
28	Worcester City (9)	0–1	Wellingborough Town (9)	331
29	Sandbach United (10)	2–0	Kimberley Miners Welfare (9)	87
30	Cheltenham Saracens (10)	3–5	Belper United (9)	30
31	Brocton (10)	1–1 (3–4 p)	Wolverhampton Casuals (9)	100
32	Racing Club Warwick (9)	1–2	Dunkirk (10)	90
33	Newent Town (10)	1–1 (3–5 p)	Eccleshall (10)	257
34	Stone Old Alleynians (9)	3–2	Shirebrook Town (10)	90
35	Blackstones (10)	1–1 (3–1 p)	Bourne Town (10)	288
36	Birstall United (10)	0–1	AFC Wulfrunians (9)	98
37	Hartpury University (10)	1–0	Tuffley Rovers (9)	67
38	Sherwood Colliery (9)	3–4	Pinchbeck United (9)	70
39	Tividale (9)	1–1 (3–1 p)	Radford (10)	83
40	Lye Town (9)	8–0	Northampton Sileby Rangers (10)	94
41	Stapenhill (10)	1–6	Walsall Wood (9)	72
42	Quorn (9)	1–3	Highgate United (9)	114
43	Buckhurst Hill (9)	2–2 (5–3 p)	Basildon Town (10)	163
44	Tring Athletic (9)	3–2	Aylesbury Vale Dynamos (9)	180
45	Downham Town (10)	2–3	Stansted (9)	82
46	Harpenden Town (9)	2–3	St. Panteleimon (9)	89
48	Norwich United (9)	3–1	Barkingside (10)	81
49	Biggleswade United (9)	2–0	Redbridge (9)	84
50	Baldock Town (9)	2–2 (4–3 p)	Benfleet (10)	69
51	Godmanchester Rovers (9)	1–2	Little Oakley (9)	138
52	Shefford Town & Campton (9)	1–1 (1–3 p)	Leighton Town (9)	187
53	Newmarket Town (9)	3–4	Romford (9)	123
55	Oxhey Jets (9)	3–1	Wisbech Town (9)	105
56	Dunstable Town (9)	2–1	Norwich CBS (10)	276

Tie	Home team (tier)	Score	Away team (tier)	Att.
57	Burnham Ramblers (10)	0–0 (4–2 p)	Ely City (9)	278
58	Whittlesey Athletic (10)	2–2 (4–3 p)	Diss Town (10)	149
59	Wormley Rovers (10)	1–1 (2–4 p)	Sheringham (9)	178
60	Erith Town (9)	1–0	Crawley Down Gatwick (9)	64
61	Eastbourne Town (9)	6–0	Brook House (10)	161
62	Crowborough Athletic (9)	4–1	Eversley & California (10)	151
63	Rising Ballers Kensington (10)	0–5	Harefield United (9)	62
64	Lydd Town (10)	0–0 (4–5 p)	Holyport (9)	111
65	Peacehaven & Telscombe (9)	4–0	Horley Town (9)	157
66	Fleet Town (9)	1–2	Colliers Wood United (9)	169
67	Chessington & Hook United (10)	4–1	Berks County (10)	126
68	Larkfield & New Hythe Wanderers (10)	3–1	Edgware & Kingsbury (9)	106
69	Rusthall (9)	2–2 (4–5 p)	Montpelier Villa (10)	165
70	Jersey Bulls (9)	3–1	Bearsted (9)	557
71	Bedfont (10)	1–0	Redhill (9)	66
72	Kennington (9)	3–1	Blackfield & Langley (9)	122
73	Rayners Lane (10)	1–2	Cowes Sports (9)	77
74	British Airways (10)	1–1 (2–4 p)	Abbey Rangers (9)	92
75	Whitchurch United (10)	0–5	Broadbridge Heath (9)	73
76	Horndean (9)	1–2	Bexhill United (9)	101
77	Tadley Calleva (9)	1–1 (2–4 p)	Guildford City (9)	693
78	AFC Stoneham (9)	2–2 (3–5 p)	Fisher (9)	32
Tie ordered to be replayed after a player sin-binned in the 88th minute for AFC Stoneham was prohibited from taking part in the penalty shoot-out
79	London Samurai Rovers (10)	3–4	Wallingford & Crowmarsh (9)	50
80	Newport (IOW) (10)	0–1	Ascot United (9)	152
81	Pagham (9)	0–1	Sporting Bengal United (9)	70
82	Deal Town (9)	7–0	Tooting Bec (10)	466
83	AFC Portchester (9)	2–3	Phoenix Sports (9)	310
84	Frimley Green (9)	0–7	North Greenford United (9)	72
86	Little Common (9)	3–1	Milton United (10)	97
87	Street (9)	1–5	Andover New Street (10)	120
88	Wellington (9)	2–0	Barnstaple Town (9)	120
89	Oldland Abbotonians (10)	0–0 (3–4 p)	Shaftesbury (9)	70
90	Falmouth Town (9)	2–1	Helston Athletic (9)	600
91	Cribbs (9)	4–2	Portland United (9)	86
92	Mangotsfield United (9)	2–0	Crediton United (10)	144
93	Bovey Tracey (10)	1–1 (4–3 p)	Ivybridge Town (10)	98
94	Bradford Town (9)	0–3	Laverstock & Ford (9)	149
95	Lydney Town (9)	1–3	Mousehole (9)	147
96	Brixham (10)	4–0	Odd Down (10)	86
97	Brimscombe & Thrupp (9)	1–1 (5–4 p)	Torpoint Athletic (9)	66
98	Cullompton Rangers (10)	2–0	Bemerton Heath Harlequins (9)	73
99	Bishops Lydeard (10)	1–2	Roman Glass St George (9)	54
100	St Blazey (10)	1–2	Thornbury Town (9)	242
101	Bridport (10)	3–5	Royal Wootton Bassett Town (9)	174
102	Keynsham Town (9)	0–4	Corsham Town (9)	88
103	Elburton Villa (10)	1–0	Ashton & Backwell United (9)	44
Sunday 23 October 2022
4	Bury AFC (9)	3–0	Bishop Auckland (9)	727
25	Coventry United (9)	3–3 (3–1 p)	Romulus (9)	149
47	May & Baker (10)	1–3	Enfield (9)	81
85	AFC Whyteleafe (10)	7–1	Snodland Town (10)	401
Saturday 29 October 2022
78	AFC Stoneham (9)	3–3 (1–3 p)	Fisher (9)	122

== Second round proper ==
The second round draw was made on 24 October 2022. The round contained the 103 winners from the previous round with an additional 25 teams who had received a bye until this stage of the competition.

Bold text

Tie	Home team (tier)	Score	Away team (tier)	Att.
Friday 11 November 2022
13	Pinchbeck United (9)	3–2	Dunkirk (10)	143
34	Dunstable Town (9)	1–0	Enfield (9)	322
Saturday 12 November 2022
2	Hallam (9)	1–1 (1–4 p)	Bury AFC (9)	660
3	Newcastle Benfield (9)	1–1 (1–3 p)	Longridge Town (9)	175
4	Wythenshawe Town (9)	2–2 (3–4 p)	Eccleshill United (9)	136
5	Brigg Town (10)	0–3	Cheadle Town (10)	384
6	AFC Darwen (9)	2–1	Thornaby (9)	187
7	Holker Old Boys (10)	3–1	FC Isle of Man (9)	145
8	Emley (9)	1–1 (2–4 p)	Squires Gate (9)	297
9	Thackley (9)	0–3	Abbey Hey (10)	152
10	Prestwich Heys * (9)	1–1 (8–7 p)	Whitley Bay (9)	252
Prestwich Heys disqualified for fielding an ineligible player
11	Barnoldswick Town (9)	1–2	Horden Community Welfare (10)	266
12	Bacup Borough (10)	2–2 (1–4 p)	West Didsbury & Chorlton (9)	307
14	Newark & Sherwood United (9)	2–1	Blackstones (10)	205
15	Atherstone Town (9)	A–A	Stone Old Alleynians (9)	322
16	Belper United (9)	4–1	Hinckley (10)	156
17	Eccleshall (10)	0–3	Coventry Sphinx (9)	128
18	Anstey Nomads (9)	3–0	Wellingborough Town (9)	187
19	Lye Town (9)	4–0	Ollerton Town (10)	145
20	Rugby Town (9)	1–2	AFC Wulfrunians (9)	226
21	Brocton (9)	1–0	Whitchurch Alport (9)	141
22	Stourport Swifts (9)	2–1	Loughborough Students (9)	152
23	Tividale (9)	0–3	Highgate United (9)	84
24	Congleton Town (9)	2–1	Coventry United (9)	263
25	Walsall Wood (9)	4–0	Sandbach United (10)	102
26	Biggleswade United (9)	3–0	London Lions (9)	129
27	Lakenheath (9)	3–2	Buckhurst Hill (9)	81
28	St. Panteleimon (9)	3–3 (3–2 p)	Sheringham (9)	36
29	Whittlesey Athletic (10)	1–0	Oxhey Jets (9)	111
31	Saffron Walden Town (9)	0–2	Leighton Town (9)	448
32	Woodford Town (9)	2–2 (3–4 p)	Fakenham Town (9)	124
33	Romford (9)	2–0	Little Oakley (9)	74

Tie	Home team (tier)	Score	Away team (tier)	Att.
35	Norwich United (9)	2–0	Stansted (9)	81
36	Tring Athletic (9)	1–1 (5–3 p)	Burnham Ramblers (10)	235
37	Stansfeld (9)	2–1	Crowborough Athletic (9)	121
38	Glebe (9)	3–6	Sporting Bengal United (9)	52
39	Phoenix Sports (9)	2–4	Deal Town (9)	176
40	Erith Town (9)	1–0	Guildford City (9)	103
41	Broadbridge Heath (9)	0–3	Ascot United (9)	237
42	Athletic Newham (9)	4–0	Kennington (9)	25
43	Fisher (9)	1–2	Jersey Bulls (9)	224
44	Bexhill United (9)	0–1	Eastbourne Town (9)	347
45	Chessington & Hook United (10)	0–3	Harefield United (9)	126
46	Wallingford & Crowmarsh (9)	1–4	Little Common (9)	122
47	Larkfield & New Hythe Wanderers (10)	2–0	Tunbridge Wells (9)	230
48	Egham Town (9)	2–1	Abbey Rangers (9)	97
49	Peacehaven & Telscombe (9)	3–1	Bedfont (10)	183
50	North Greenford United (9)	3–2	AFC Whyteleafe (10)	85
51	Montpelier Villa (10)	0–7	Holyport (9)	75
52	Colliers Wood United (9)	0–1	Raynes Park Vale (9)	101
53	Buckland Athletic (9)	5–1	Cullompton Rangers (10)	104
54	Mousehole (9)	1–2	Hartpury University (10)	172
55	Clevedon Town (9)	4–0	Mangotsfield United (9)	133
56	New Milton Town (10)	2–1	Cowes Sports (9)	153
57	Laverstock & Ford (9)	2–1	Falmouth Town (9)	280
58	Roman Glass St George (9)	1–3	Corsham Town (9)	90
59	Brimscombe & Thrupp (9)	3–3 (1–4 p)	Shaftesbury (9)	98
60	Brixham (10)	2–1	Andover New Street (9)	198
61	Bovey Tracey (10)	4–3	Brockenhurst (9)	161
62	Elburton Villa (10)	0–4	Bridgwater United (9)	60
63	Wellington (10)	2–2 (4–5 p)	Royal Wootton Bassett Town (9)	95
64	Thornbury Town (9)	1–2	Cribbs (9)	110
Sunday 13 November 2022
1	AFC Liverpool (9)	1–1 (4–3 p)	FC St Helens (10)	222
30	Baldock Town (9)	1–4	Newport Pagnell Town (9)	223
Saturday 19 November 2022
15	Atherstone Town (9)	2–0	Stone Old Alleynians (9)	232

== Third round proper ==
The third round draw was made on 14 November 2022, consisting of the 64 winners from the previous round.

Tie	Home team (tier)	Score	Away team (tier)	Att.
Friday 2 December 2022
32	Bridgwater United (9)	1–0	Cribbs (9)	289
Saturday 3 December 2022
1	Longridge Town (9)	1–1 (2–4 p)	Eccleshill United (9)	170
2	Holker Old Boys (10)	4–2	Squires Gate (9)	135
3	Bury AFC (9)	2–0	Abbey Hey (10)	743
4	AFC Liverpool (9)	2–1	Cheadle Town (10)	137
5	Horden Community Welfare (10)	2–0	AFC Darwen (10)	303
6	Whitley Bay (9)	1–1 (1–4 p)	West Didsbury & Chorlton (9)	440
7	Belper United (9)	0–6	Coventry Sphinx (9)	101
8	AFC Wulfrunians (9)	3–0	Brocton (10)	192
9	Atherstone Town (9)	1–1 (4–2 p)	Stourport Swifts (10)	258
10	Newark & Sherwood (9)	0–2	Anstey Nomads (9)	175
11	Congleton Town (9)	4–3	Lye Town (9)	301
12	Highgate United (9)	0–7	Walsall Wood (9)	73
13	Biggleswade United (9)	1–1 (3–1 p)	Lakenheath (9)	217
14	Leighton Town (9)	2–1	Fakenham Town (9)	413
15	Whittlesey Athletic (10)	1–3	Romford (9)	172

Tie	Home team (tier)	Score	Away team (tier)	Att.
16	Pinchbeck United (9)	1–0	St. Panteleimon (9)	77
17	Norwich United (9)	0–1	Newport Pagnell Town (9)	227
19	Stansfeld (9)	1–2	Erith Town (9)	76
20	Harefield United (9)	2–1	North Greenford United (9)	125
21	Jersey Bulls (9)	5–1	Athletic Newham (9)	474
22	Sporting Bengal United (10)	2–2 (4–5 p)	Deal Town (9)	97
23	Larkfield & New Hythe Wanderers (10)	1–2	Raynes Park Vale (9)	154
24	Eastbourne Town (9)	0–1	Egham Town (9)	244
25	Holyport (9)	0–0 (2–3 p)	Peacehaven & Telscombe (9)	152
26	Ascot United (9)	4–0	Little Common (9)	107
27	Clevedon Town (9)	1–1 (5–3 p)	New Milton Town (10)	154
28	Shaftesbury (9)	1–1 (4–5 p)	Brixham (10)	94
29	Hartpury University (10)	7–0	Bovey Tracey (10)	113
30	Buckland Athletic (9)	3–0	Laverstock & Ford (9)	180
31	Royal Wootton Bassett Town (9)	0–0 (3–4 p)	Corsham Town (9)	184
Sunday 4 December 2022
18	Dunstable Town (9)	2–3	Tring Athletic (9)	252

== Fourth round proper ==
The draw for the fourth round was made on 5 December 2022.

Tie	Home team (tier)	Score	Away team (tier)	Att.
Saturday 14 January 2023
3	West Didsbury & Chorlton (9)	2–0	Horden Community Welfare (10)	1,019
7	Congleton Town (9)	4–0	Pinchbeck United (9)	388
9	AFC Wulfrunians (9)	1–0	Anstey Nomads (9)	189
16	Jersey Bulls (9)	6–0	Romford (9)	621
Tuesday 17 January 2023
2	Bury AFC (9)	4–0	Holker Old Boys (10)	400
Match played at Darwen F.C.
Saturday 21 January 2023
12	Brixham (10)	2–0	Raynes Park Vale (9)	295
Saturday 28 January 2023
1	Eccleshill United (9)	0–0 (5–4 p)	AFC Liverpool (9)	153

Tie	Home team (tier)	Score	Away team (tier)	Att.
4	Atherstone Town (9)	2–0	Hartpury University (9)	483
5	Tring Athletic (9)	A–A	Walsall Wood (9)	270
Match was abandoned because of the floodlights going out. Match was tied 1–1 at the 80th minute.
6	Biggleswade United (9)	1—5	Coventry Sphinx (9)	326
8	Newport Pagnell Town (9)	1–1 (7–6 p)	Leighton Town (9)	1,435
10	Buckland Athletic (9)	1–3	Ascot United (9)	212
11	Clevedon Town (9)	2–2 (1–3 p)	Harefield United (9)	106
13	Egham Town (9)	0–2	Peacehaven & Telscombe (9)	230
14	Corsham Town (9)	1–0	Deal Town (9)	287
15	Bridgwater United (9)	0–0 (4–1 p)	Erith Town (9)	355
Saturday 4 February 2023
5	Tring Athletic (9)	2–1	Walsall Wood (9)	161

== Fifth round proper ==
The draw for the fifth round proper was made on 16 January 2023.

Tie	Home team (tier)	Score	Away team (tier)	Att.
Saturday 11 February 2023
1	Eccleshill United (9)	0–2	Atherstone Town (9)	343
2	AFC Wulfrunians (9)	0–1	Congleton Town (9)	453
3	Tring Athletic (9)	1–2	Bury AFC (9)	840
4	Coventry Sphinx (9)	1–1 (1–3 p)	West Didsbury & Chorlton (9)	388

Tie	Home team (tier)	Score	Away team (tier)	Att.
5	Newport Pagnell Town (9)	1–0	Jersey Bulls (9)	990
6	Harefield United (9)	0–0 (1–3 p)	Peacehaven & Telscombe (9)	460
7	Corsham Town (9)	1–1 (4–3 p)	Brixham (10)	344
8	Bridgwater United (9)	0–1	Ascot United (9)	429

== Quarter-finals ==
The draw for the quarter-finals was made on 13 February 2023.

Tie	Home team (tier)	Score	Away team (tier)	Att.
Saturday 11 March 2023
1	West Didsbury & Chorlton (9)	1–1 (3–4 p)	Ascot United (9)	1,320
2	Newport Pagnell Town (9)	2–2 (4–3 p)	Atherstone Town (9)	1,501
3	Peacehaven & Telscombe (9)	1–1 (2–3 p)	Corsham Town (9)	1,253
4	Congleton Town (9)	1–1 (5–4 p)	Bury AFC (9)	1,120

== Semi-finals ==
The four semi-finalists played one-leg semifinals to determine the finalists for the FA Vase. The draw was made on Monday, March 13, 2023.

1 April 2023
15:00

Congleton Town (9)	2–2	Newport Pagnell Town (9)
Duffy 35'; Hartshorn 66'	Report	Watkinson 45+1'; Ahmed 61'
Penalties
Penalty missed Penalty scored	2–3	(penalty scored) Watkinson; (penalty missed) Barnes; (penalty missed) Conway; (penalty scored) Shepherd; (penalty scored) Hall

Cleric Stadium, Congleton
Attendance: 1,436

1 April 2023
15:00

Corsham Town (9)	2–2	Ascot United (9)
Rusby 50'; Keet 68'	Report	Matthew 34'; Gerrard 78'
Penalties
Allen (penalty scored); Davies (penalty missed); Swann (penalty scored); Davis (penalty scored); Demkiv (penalty scored); Keet (penalty missed); Simpson (penalty missed)	4–5	(penalty scored) Grant; (penalty missed) Tucker; (penalty scored) Matthew; (penalty scored) Mealing; (penalty scored) Grant; (penalty missed) Gerrard; (penalty scored) McCormack

Southbank, Corsham
Attendance: 1,736

== Final ==
The final was played on Sunday, 21 May 2023 at Wembley Stadium. Newport Pagnell Town entered the game as defending champions, reaching the final for the second successive season. Ascot United appeared in their first final.

21 May 2023
12:15 BST

Ascot United (9)	1–0	Newport Pagnell Town (9)
Walters 79'

Wembley Stadium, London
Referee: Anthony Backhouse
