= 2015–16 Western Football League =

Western Football League
- Season: 2015–16

The 2015–16 Western Football League season (known as the 2015–16 Toolstation Western Football League for sponsorship reasons) is the 114th in the history of the Western Football League, a football competition in England. Teams are divided into two divisions; the Premier and the First. The league's constitution was announced on 11 June 2015.

== Premier Division ==
The Premier Division was increased from 19 clubs to 21, and features four new clubs after Slimbridge were promoted to Southern League Division One South & West, and Bishop Sutton were relegated to the First Division.

- Barnstaple Town, champions of the First Division.
- Clevedon Town, demoted from Southern League Division One South & West for ground grading reasons.
- Cribbs, third-placed club in the First Division.
- Welton Rovers, runners-up in the First Division.

Seven clubs applied for promotion to Step 4: Barnstaple Town, Brislington, Bristol Manor Farm, Buckland Athletic, Odd Down, Melksham Town and Street. Odd Down failed the ground grading requirements, and Melksham's new ground will not be ready in time for next season.

=== League table ===
Pos	Team	Pld	W	D	L	GF	GA	GD	Pts	Promotion or relegation
1	Odd Down (C)	38	28	4	6	98	45	+53	88	
2	Barnstaple Town (P)	38	27	4	7	78	33	+45	85	Promotion to Southern League Division One S&W
3	Bristol Manor Farm	38	25	5	8	109	44	+65	80	
4	Buckland Athletic	38	24	6	8	91	34	+57	78	
5	Melksham Town	38	22	7	9	65	38	+27	73	
6	Willand Rovers	38	21	7	10	72	52	+20	70	
7	Street	38	20	5	13	82	63	+19	65	
8	Bradford Town	38	19	5	14	91	58	+33	62	
9	Gillingham Town	38	16	8	14	75	65	+10	56	
10	Shepton Mallet	38	18	7	13	61	52	+9	52 (Note: Shepton Mallet were deducted 12 points for fielding an ineligible player.)	
11	Brislington	38	14	5	19	44	64	−20	47	
12	Cadbury Heath	38	11	10	17	66	77	−11	43	
13	Sherborne Town	38	10	10	18	50	70	−20	40	
14	Bitton	38	11	6	21	55	73	−18	39	
15	Cribbs	38	10	7	21	55	72	−17	37	
16	Bridport	38	10	6	22	51	90	−39	36	
17	Hallen	38	11	3	24	49	94	−45	36	
18	Longwell Green Sports	38	10	7	21	45	90	−45	36 (Note: Longwell Green Sports were deducted one point, and Shepton Mallet awarded three points (reason unknown).)	
19	Clevedon Town	38	6	6	26	33	100	−67	24	
20	Welton Rovers (R)	38	4	8	26	42	98	−56	20	Relegation to the First Division
21	Winterbourne United	0	0	0	0	0	0	0	0	Resigned from the league, record expunged (Note: Winterbourne United resigned in December 2015 and their record of P15 W3 D0 L12 GF21 GA39 ₧9 was expunged.)

Updated to match(es) played on 7 May 2016. Source:
Rules for classification: 1) points; 2) goal difference; 3) number of goals scored.
(C) Champions; (P) Promoted; (R) Relegated

== First Division ==
The First Division was reduced from 22 clubs to 21, and features two new clubs after the promotion of Barnstaple Town, Cribbs and Welton Rovers to the Premier Division:

- Bishop Sutton, relegated from the Premier Division.
- Chipping Sodbury Town, promoted from the Gloucestershire County League.

=== League table ===
Pos	Team	Pld	W	D	L	GF	GA	GD	Pts	Promotion
1	Chipping Sodbury Town (C, P)	40	23	7	10	84	52	+32	76	Promotion to the Premier Division
2	Wells City (P)	40	23	7	10	91	61	+30	76	Promotion to the Premier Division
3	Chard Town	40	22	8	10	70	49	+21	74	
4	Oldland Abbotonians	40	22	6	12	81	54	+27	72	
5	Cheddar	40	21	9	10	81	57	+24	72	
6	Portishead Town	40	20	10	10	83	52	+31	70	
7	Hengrove Athletic	40	21	7	12	57	37	+20	70	
8	Ashton & Backwell United	40	20	9	11	86	56	+30	66 (Note: Ashton & Backwell United were deducted three points.)	
9	Keynsham Town	40	20	6	14	84	65	+19	66	
10	Corsham Town	40	17	9	14	81	61	+20	60	
11	Almondsbury UWE	40	16	8	16	75	56	+19	56	
12	Wellington	40	15	10	15	71	56	+15	55	
13	Radstock Town	40	16	6	18	67	71	−4	54	
14	Chippenham Park	40	14	11	15	51	52	−1	53	
15	Calne Town	40	15	7	18	60	76	−16	52	
16	Wincanton Town	40	13	7	20	75	90	−15	46	
17	Warminster Town	40	13	7	20	52	75	−23	46	
18	Roman Glass St George	40	11	7	22	71	95	−24	40	
19	Devizes Town	40	11	5	24	55	107	−52	38	
20	Westbury United	40	8	6	26	50	98	−48	30	
21	Bishop Sutton	40	2	2	36	29	134	−105	8	

Updated to match(es) played on 7 May 2016. Source:
Rules for classification: 1) points; 2) goal difference; 3) number of goals scored.
(C) Champions; (P) Promoted
