= Bruce Grobbelaar =

Zimbabwean footballer and manager (born 1957)

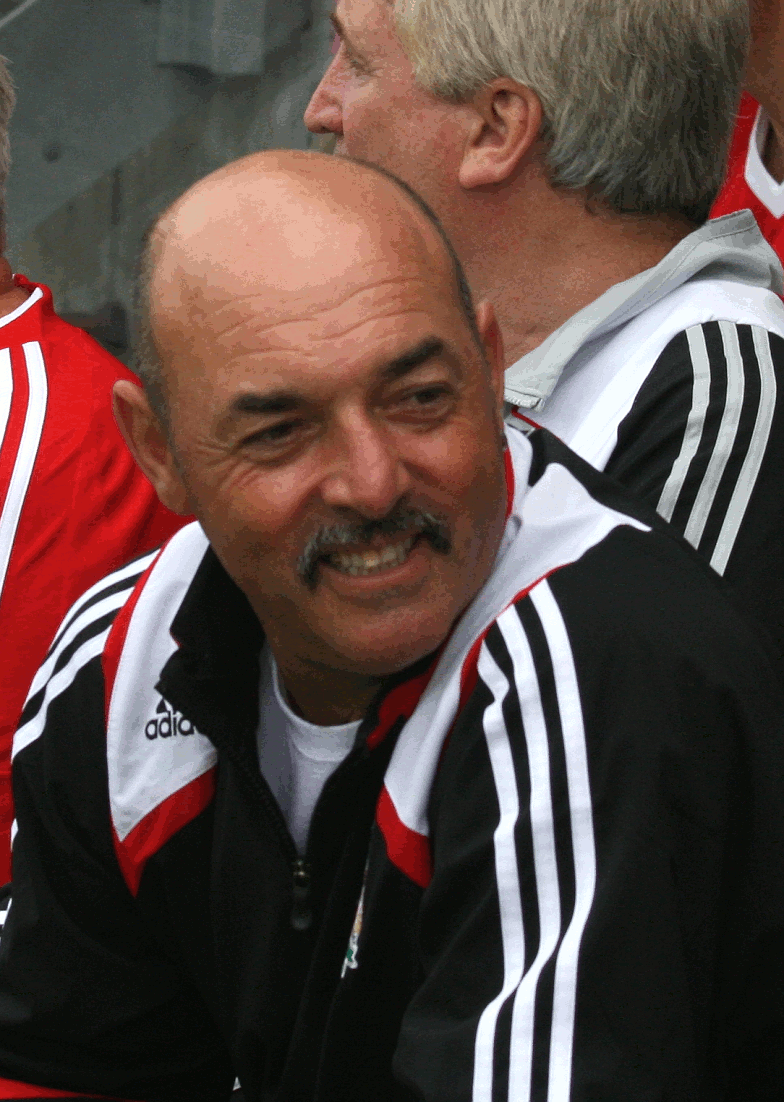
- Grobbelaar in 2008

Personal information
- Full name: Bruce David Grobbelaar
- Date of birth: 6 October 1957 (age 69)
- Place of birth: Durban, South Africa
- Height: 6 ft 1 in (1.85 m)
- Position: Goalkeeper

Senior career*
Years	Team	Apps	(Gls)
1973–1974	Highlanders	2	(0)
1975	Chibuku Shumba	13	(0)
1976	Highlands Park	0	(0)
1977–1978	Durban City	23	(0)
1979–1981	Vancouver Whitecaps	24	(0)
1979–1980	→ Crewe Alexandra (loan)	24	(1)
1981–1994	Liverpool	440	(0)
1993	→ Stoke City (loan)	4	(0)
1994–1996	Southampton	32	(0)
1996–1997	Plymouth Argyle	36	(0)
1997	Oxford United	0	(0)
1997	Sheffield Wednesday	0	(0)
1997–1998	Oldham Athletic	4	(0)
1998	Chesham United	4	(0)
1998	Bury	1	(0)
1998	Lincoln City	2	(0)
1999	Northwich Victoria	1	(0)
2002	Hellenic	1	(0)
2007	Glasshoughton Welfare	1	(0)
Total		574	(1)

International career
1977–1998	Zimbabwe	33	(0)
2018	Matabeleland	1	(0)

Managerial career
- 1997: Zimbabwe
- 1998: Zimbabwe
- 1999–2001: SuperSport United
- 2001–2002: Hellenic
- * Club domestic league appearances and goals

Bruce David Grobbelaar (born 6 October 1957) is a Zimbabwean former professional footballer who played as a goalkeeper, most prominently for English club Liverpool between 1981 and 1994, and for the Zimbabwean national team. Regarded as one of the best goalkeepers of his era, he is remembered for his gymnastic-like athletic ability, unflappable confidence, eccentric and flamboyant style of play, as well as his rushing ability, which has led pundits to compare him retrospectively to the sweeper-keepers of the modern era.

Born in South Africa, Grobbelaar grew up in neighbouring Rhodesia (today Zimbabwe), and served in the Rhodesian Army before he joined the Vancouver Whitecaps of the North American Soccer League in 1979. He gained Liverpool's attention during a loan spell at Crewe Alexandra during the 1979–80 season, and signed for the Merseyside club in 1981. Making 628 appearances for Liverpool over the next 13 years, including 440 in the League, he won the League championship with the club six times, as well as three FA Cups, three League Cups and the 1983–84 European Cup.

Grobbelaar left Liverpool for Southampton in 1994, transferred to Plymouth Argyle two years later, and thereafter played for an assortment of English lower-league teams, never for more than a few games. He was appointed as goalkeeper coach for Ottawa Fury FC of the North American Soccer League in 2014. In March 2018 he was announced as goalkeeper coach for the Matabeleland football team.

== Club career ==
=== Early years ===
In his teenage years, Grobbelaar was a talented cricketer and was offered a baseball scholarship in the United States, but a career in football was his main ambition. He attended David Livingstone Primary School in Harare before moving onto Hamilton High School in Bulawayo, Rhodesia's second biggest city. His footballing career started with a Bulawayo-based team, Highlanders. In his late teens, he was signed up by Durban City in South Africa, but left, claiming to have been sidelined owing to his colour in a predominantly black team — the team had played in an all-white league until the previous year. Immediately after leaving Highlands Park, he was conscripted into National Service, spending eleven months on active service in the Rhodesia Regiment during the Rhodesian Bush War.

=== Vancouver Whitecaps ===
In 1979, Grobbelaar was signed by the Vancouver Whitecaps of the NASL after he had attended their scouting camp in South Africa. At the Vancouver Whitecaps, Grobbelaar played under the management of former England and Blackpool goalkeeper, Tony Waiters, making his debut on 4 August 1979 against the Los Angeles Aztecs away. The Whitecaps lost 2–0, Johan Cruyff scoring one of the Aztecs' goals. Grobbelaar spent the rest of the season as second choice to former Wolverhampton Wanderers keeper Phil Parkes.

During 1979, he visited England to see family friends, and a chance phone call from Ron Atkinson, brought him an impromptu trial with West Bromwich Albion. Atkinson was keen to sign Grobbelaar but owing to difficulties over gaining a work permit, the deal fell through. In stepped Crewe Alexandra, signing Grobbelaar on loan on 18 December 1979. In an early League appearance for the Railwaymen in the Fourth Division, the unknown Grobbelaar was named on the team sheet in the York City matchday programme as "Bill Grobbelaar". During his time at Crewe, Grobbelaar played 24 League games and scored his only professional goal, a penalty, in his last game. By good fortune, on the evening when he gave his greatest performance for Crewe, he was spotted by Liverpool's head scout Tom Saunders.

At the end of the loan period, Grobbelaar returned to Vancouver for the 1980 NASL season.

=== Liverpool ===
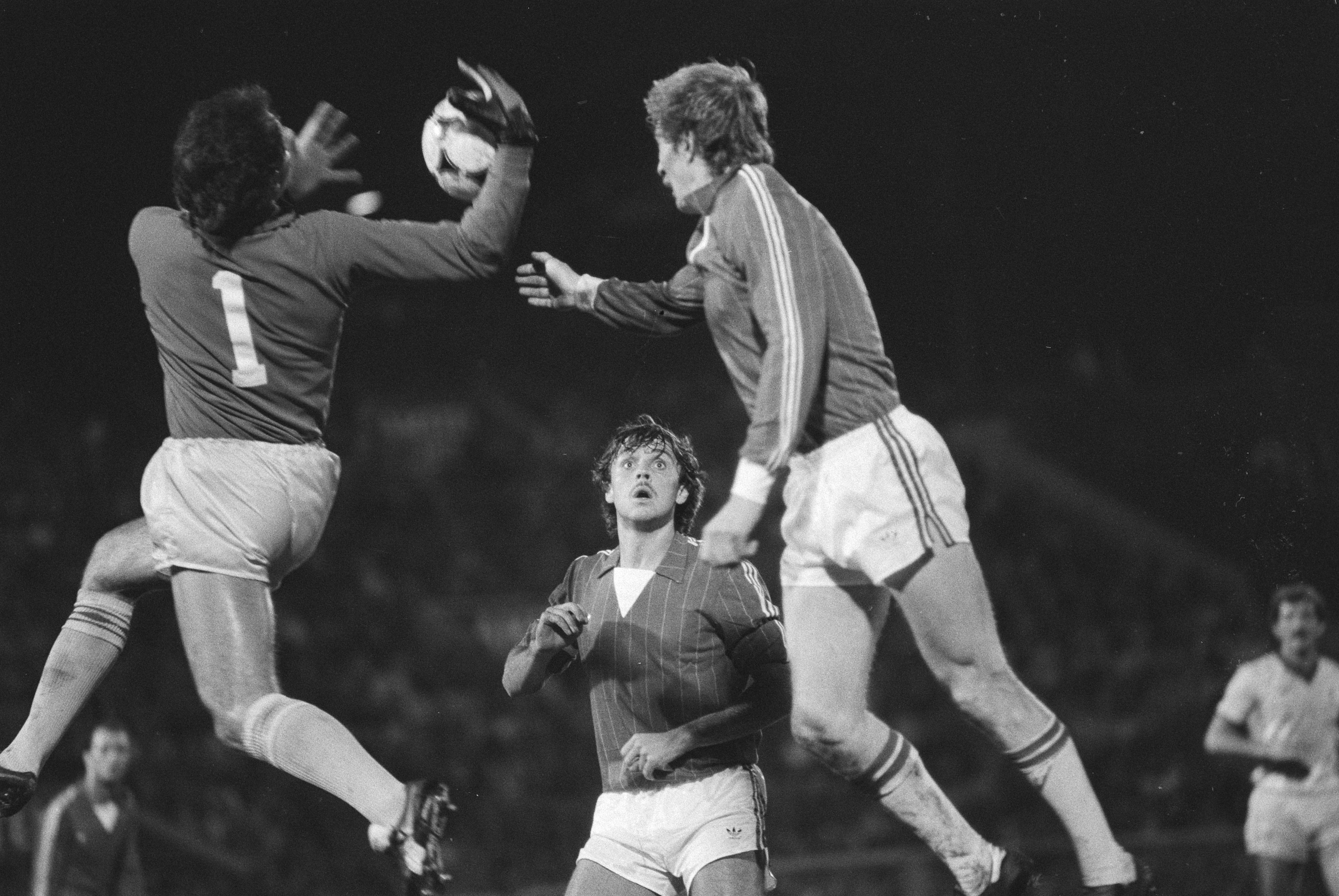
Grobbelaar in October 1981, scooping the ball away from AZ's Jos Jonker (right)

By the time Liverpool had completed their research on Grobbelaar, he had returned to Vancouver with his loan spell now over. Liverpool approached Tony Waiters with the idea of taking Grobbelaar to Anfield, and Waiters, who had a working relationship with Liverpool in the 1970s, paved the way for the move. Grobbelaar signed for Liverpool for £250,000 on 17 March 1981 as their reserve goalkeeper, but in mid-1981, regular goalkeeper Ray Clemence's departure to Tottenham Hotspur gave Grobbelaar his opportunity.

Grobbelaar made his debut on 28 August 1981 but failed to prevent Wolverhampton Wanderers winning the league fixture 1–0 at Molineux. Also making their debuts were defender Mark Lawrenson and midfielder Craig Johnston. His first clean sheet came a fortnight later at Anfield on 5 September, Arsenal were the visitors who were beaten by a 2–0 scoreline.

Grobbelaar's early days as No.1 were strewn with errors and the Reds struggled to obtain any sort of consistency, Grobbelaar taking a lot of the blame. By the end of the calendar year Liverpool were mid table in the league and looked to be out of the running for title honours, especially as they had just lost to Manchester City 3–1 at Anfield in the Boxing Day fixture – a defeat which put John Bond's team top of the league. The New Year brought a new momentum as Bob Paisley began to get the best out of his players; they began the year in South Wales visiting the Vetch Field to play Swansea City in the FA Cup, Liverpool were in fine form and beat the hosts 4–0. This set them on their way in the league, dropping just seven of the 50 available points, overhauling the points gap that Ipswich Town had opened on them.

Grobbelaar added the championship medal to the League Cup winners medal he had gained at Wembley on 13 March; the Reds won 3–1, beating Spurs who had Ray Clemence in goal.

During the period 1981–1994, Grobbelaar played 627 first team games for Liverpool, becoming known for his eccentric and flamboyant style. In the 1984 European Cup final between Liverpool and AS Roma, he became the first African player to feature in a European Cup final. The game finished 1–1 after extra time and went to a penalty shootout. As Roma's Bruno Conti prepared to take his kick, Grobbelaar walked towards the goal smiling confidently at the cameras lined-up behind, then proceeded to bite the back of the net, in imitation of eating spaghetti. Conti sent his spot kick over the bar. Grobbelaar then produced a similar performance before Francesco Graziani took his kick, wobbling his legs in mock terror. Graziani missed and Liverpool went on to win the shootout 4–2. Grobbelaar became the first African to win the European Cup/UEFA Champions League.

Grobbelaar was retained by three of Liverpool's greatest managers; Paisley, Fagan and Dalglish, over a period of 13 years. His strengths were his gymnastic-like agility, and an unflappable confidence. He was never afraid to be seen to berate his defenders if he thought they had given easy opportunities to the opposition, such as in his verbal assault on Jim Beglin in the first all Merseyside FA Cup final against Everton in 1986. Over the course of his Liverpool career he won more medals than any of his contemporaries.

In 1984–85, Grobbelaar brought down a spectator who had invaded the pitch during a game, allowing the police to handcuff the offender.

Although there were occasional challenges to his position as Liverpool's number 1, Grobbelaar was a virtual ever-present from Clemence's departure to the start of the 1990s which coincided with the end of the club's dominance. He was a mainstay in his first five league campaigns at Anfield, when Liverpool were champions four times and runners-up on the other occasion. However, in 1988–89, injuries and illness restricted his first team opportunities and he played 21 times in the league, with Mike Hooper taking his place on the other 17 occasions. However, he was fit to face Everton in the 3–2 FA Cup win on 20 May 1989, though six days later he conceded a last minute goal to Arsenal midfielder Michael Thomas on the final day of the league season as the league title was wrenched from Liverpool's grasp and headed to Highbury instead. A month earlier, he played in the FA Cup semi-final win over Nottingham Forest which was played at Old Trafford after the original match at Hillsborough was cancelled due to the tragedy that led to 97 fans dying on the terracing behind Grobbelaar's goal. Grobbelaar attended many of the victims' funerals.

The signing of David James from Watford in mid-1992 spelt the beginning of the end for Grobbelaar at Liverpool. Although James struggled to impress at first, Grobbelaar's insistence on playing for Zimbabwe gave James chances; Grobbelaar only played six times for Liverpool during 1992–93 and spent a short period on loan at Second Division side Stoke City where he made four appearances. James's uncertainty allowed Grobbelaar to regain his place in the first team at the start of the 1993–94 season, in which his performance, like the team's, started well but fell away badly. In a notorious incident in a Merseyside derby that year, Grobbelaar even physically assaulted young teammate Steve McManaman. He was a consistent starter until he was injured in the final minute of a 2–0 defeat at Leeds United on 19 February 1994, in what would be his final appearance for the club.

In 14 years at the club, he had won six league title medals, three FA Cup winner's medal, three Football League Cup winner's medals and a European Cup winner's medal.

=== Southampton ===
Grobbelaar left Liverpool in mid-1994, transferring on a free transfer to Southampton. He made his debut on 20 August 1994 in the 1–1 league draw with Blackburn Rovers at The Dell. He spent two seasons with the Saints competing with another goalkeeper with a reputation for eccentricity, Dave Beasant. Despite the fuss caused by the match-fixing allegations (see below), manager Alan Ball maintained faith in him, and he kept his place in the team for most of the 1994–95 season.

Allegations that Grobbelar had been match-fixing first appeared in November 1994. Nevertheless, in his next game, at home to Arsenal, he kept a clean sheet despite the media frenzy that surrounded the game. The Southern Daily Echo reported that Grobbelaar was "swept along on a tidal wave of emotion, to emerge triumphant from the toughest match of his life".

In the 1995–96 season, Grobbelaar only managed two games for the Saints, before moving on to Plymouth Argyle.

=== After Southampton ===
Grobbelaar spent the 1996–97 season with Plymouth, after which he spent short spells at Oxford United, Sheffield Wednesday, Oldham Athletic, Chesham United, Bury, Lincoln City and Northwich Victoria over the next two years before returning to his native country.

== International career ==
Grobbelaar was born in Durban, South Africa to ethnic Afrikaner parents. When he was two months old, he emigrated to Rhodesia with his mother and sister to join his father, who had got a job on the railways there.

Grobbelaar grew up and learnt his football in Rhodesia. He made his international debut for Rhodesia as a 19-year-old in a friendly versus South Africa in 1977. Grobbelaar played for Zimbabwe in both of their 1982 World Cup qualifying matches versus Cameroon. He also appeared for his country in a qualifying match for the 1986 World Cup versus Egypt.

In 1992, he returned to the national team after an absence of several years. With a team including Grobbelaar and Adam and Peter Ndlovu, Zimbabwe came just a victory short of qualification for the 1994 World Cup under the guidance of manager Reinhard Fabisch. Grobbelaar earned 32 caps for Zimbabwe between 1980 and 1998.

On 7 June 2018, Grobbelaar played a one-off game for Matabeleland in the ConIFA World Cup against the Chagos Islands, playing 30 minutes.

== Match-fixing allegations ==
On 10 November 1994, Grobbelaar was accused by the British tabloid newspaper The Sun of match fixing during his time at Liverpool to benefit a betting syndicate, after being caught on videotape discussing match-fixing. He was charged with conspiracy to corrupt, along with the Wimbledon goalkeeper Hans Segers and Aston Villa striker John Fashanu (only recently signed from Wimbledon), and a Malaysian businessman, Heng Suan Lim.

Despite these allegations, Grobbelaar and Segers were allowed to continue playing, while Fashanu retired from playing less than a year after being charged. Grobbelaar pleaded not guilty, claiming he was only gathering evidence with the intent of taking it to the police. After two successive trials, in both of which the jury could not agree on a verdict, he and his co-defendants were cleared in November 1997. Grobbelaar later sued The Sun for libel and was awarded £85,000. The Sun appealed, and the case was eventually taken to the House of Lords where it was found that, though the specific allegations had not been proved, there was adequate evidence of dishonesty. The Lords slashed his award to £1, the lowest libel damages possible under English law, and ordered him to pay The Sun's legal costs, estimated at £500,000. In his judgement, Lord Bingham of Cornhill observed:

The tort of defamation protects those whose reputations have been unlawfully injured. It affords little or no protection to those who have, or deserve to have, no reputation deserving of legal protection. Until 9 November 1994 when the newspaper published its first articles about him, the appellant's public reputation was unblemished. But he had in fact acted in a way in which no decent or honest footballer would act and in a way which could, if not exposed and stamped on, undermine the integrity of a game which earns the loyalty and support of millions.

Grobbelaar was unable to pay the costs and was declared bankrupt. He and Segers did not retire from playing until some time after being cleared of their involvement in the alleged match fixing.

== Retirement and coaching ==
Grobbelaar moved back to South Africa, his place of birth, where he coached a number of teams with various degrees of success. He managed Seven Stars in 1999 and took the team from the relegation zone to finish fourth in the final league table. In 2001, he took over struggling Hellenic. While at the club, he saved them from relegation, and played in their last match of the season, against Kaizer Chiefs, starting the game, and substituting himself after 20 minutes after cracking his ribs. He was the oldest player ever to have played in the South African league, at 44 years old, until his record was beaten in 2013 by fellow keeper Andre Arendse. He also spent time coaching Supersport United, Manning Rangers (2004) and Umtata Bush Bucks (2004), as well as in Zimbabwe, where he was twice briefly player-manager of Zimbabwe's national team in 1997 and 1998.

Grobbelaar briefly returned to the United Kingdom to help coach a number of clubs. Grobbelaar has previously stated that he "hopes to one day return to Anfield as the manager of Liverpool FC."

Grobbelaar returned to England in 2006 to play in a replay of the 1986 FA Cup final against Everton for the Marina Dalglish Appeal, a charity for Cancer research set up by former team-mate and manager Kenny Dalglish and his wife, Marina, a cancer survivor. Liverpool won the match 1–0.

Grobbelaar played in Sky One's The Match in 2004 and The Match 3 in 2006, keeping a clean sheet in both games.

Grobbelaar, also known as "Brucie", is still popular with Liverpool fans, and was voted as No.17 in a poll 100 Players Who Shook The Kop conducted in mid-2006 by the official Liverpool Football Club website. Over 110,000 worldwide voted for their best ten players in the Anfield club's history, with Grobbelaar finishing 2nd in the goalkeeping stakes.

In March 2007, Liverpool's official website announced that Grobbelaar would come out of retirement for a one-off game and play for non-league Castleford side Glasshoughton Welfare to help them in their fight for survival. He played against Maltby Main on 14 April 2007, helping Glasshoughton to a 2–1 win.

On a 16 April 2009 episode of ITV's Hell's Kitchen, Grobbelaar wore a black armband on his left arm in remembrance of the 20th anniversary of the Hillsborough disaster. On 22 April, he left the show citing a need to be reunited with his wife.

He was persuaded to play for Winterbourne United in their Gloucestershire FA Trophy game against Patchway Town on 5 December 2009 but in the end did not make an appearance. Winterbourne at that time were managed by Nicky Tanner, who was a teammate of Grobbelaar at Liverpool.

During the World Cup 2010 in South Africa, he appeared on Norwegian TV-channel TV 2.

As of 2012, Grobbelaar resided in Corner Brook, Newfoundland, Canada, where he was active in the local soccer scene, playing keeper for Corner Brook Men's Soccer League team West Side Monarchs, and occasionally lending his expertise to the Corner Brook Minor Soccer Association as a coach.

From July 2014 to January 2018, he was the goalkeeping coach for Ottawa Fury FC of the North American Soccer League and subsequently the United Soccer League.

In May 2018, he became goalkeeping coach for the Matabeleland football team, and on 1 June it was announced that he would join the playing roster for their remaining group games. It was subsequently announced by head coach Justin Walley that he would start in goal against Chagos Islands on 7 June 2018. He later became the goalkeeping coach with Norwegian club Øygarden FK.

== Personal life ==
From 1983 to 2008 Grobbelaar was married to Deborah. They have two daughters. He then married Karen Phillips. They have a daughter. He is now married to Janne Hamre Karlsen.

== Career statistics ==
Club	Season	League			FA Cup		League Cup		Europe		Other^{[A]}		Total	
Club	Season	Division	Apps	Goals	Apps	Goals	Apps	Goals	Apps	Goals	Apps	Goals	Apps	Goals
Vancouver Whitecaps	1979	NASL	1	0	―		―		―		―		1	0
Vancouver Whitecaps	1980	NASL	23	0	―		―		―		―		23	0
Vancouver Whitecaps	Total		24	0	―		―		―		―		24	0
Crewe Alexandra (loan)	1979–80	Fourth Division	24	1	0	0	0	0	0	0	0	0	24	1
Liverpool	1980–81	First Division	0	0	0	0	0	0	0	0	0	0	0	0
Liverpool	1981–82	First Division	42	0	3	0	10	0	6	0	1	0	62	0
Liverpool	1982–83	First Division	42	0	3	0	8	0	6	0	1	0	60	0
Liverpool	1983–84	First Division	42	0	2	0	13	0	9	0	1	0	67	0
Liverpool	1984–85	First Division	42	0	7	0	3	0	10	0	2	0	64	0
Liverpool	1985–86	First Division	42	0	8	0	7	0	―		6	0	63	0
Liverpool	1986–87	First Division	31	0	3	0	9	0	―		2	0	45	0
Liverpool	1987–88	First Division	38	0	5	0	3	0	―		―		46	0
Liverpool	1988–89	First Division	21	0	5	0	0	0	―		2	0	28	0
Liverpool	1989–90	First Division	38	0	8	0	3	0	―		1	0	50	0
Liverpool	1990–91	First Division	31	0	7	0	3	0	―		1	0	42	0
Liverpool	1991–92	First Division	37	0	9	0	4	0	5	0	―		55	0
Liverpool	1992–93	Premier League	5	0	0	0	2	0	1	0	1	0	10	0
Liverpool	1993–94	Premier League	29	0	2	0	5	0	―		―		36	0
Liverpool	Total		440	0	62	0	70	0	38	0	18	0	628	0
Stoke City (loan)	1992–93	Second Division	4	0	0	0	―		―		0	0	4	0
Southampton	1994–95	Premier League	30	0	5	0	3	0	―		0	0	38	0
Southampton	1995–96	Premier League	2	0	0	0	0	0	―		0	0	2	0
Southampton	Total		32	0	5	0	3	0	―		0	0	40	0
Plymouth Argyle	1996–97	Second Division	36	0	3	0	2	0	―		0	0	41	0
Oldham Athletic	1997–98	Second Division	4	0	0	0	0	0	―		0	0	4	0
Chesham United	1998–99	Isthmian League Premier Division	4	0	0	0	―		―		0	0	4	0
Bury	1998–99	First Division	1	0	0	0	0	0	―		0	0	1	0
Lincoln City	1998–99	Second Division	2	0	0	0	0	0	―		0	0	2	0
Northwich Victoria	1999–2000	Conference	1	0	0	0	―		―		0	0	1	0
Hellenic	2001–02	Premier Soccer League	1	0	―		―		―		0	0	1	0
Glasshoughton Welfare	2006–07	Northern Counties East League	1	0	0	0	―		―		0	0	1	0
Career Total			574	1	70	0	75	0	38	0	18	0	775	1

- A. The "Other" column constitutes appearances and goals in the Charity Shield, Screen Sport Super Cup, Intercontinental Cup, and Centenary Trophy.

== Honours ==
Liverpool

- Football League First Division: 1981–82, 1982–83, 1983–84, 1985–86, 1987–88, 1989–90
- FA Cup: 1985–86, 1988–89, 1991–92; runner-up: 1987–88
- Football League Cup: 1981–82, 1982–83, 1983–84; runner-up: 1986–87
- FA Charity Shield: 1982, 1986, 1988, 1989, 1990
- European Cup: 1983–84
- Football League Super Cup: 1986

== Appearances in popular culture ==
- Grobbelaar appears on the track "Anfield Rap", a song released by members of Liverpool F.C. before the 1988 FA Cup Final.
- Grobbelaar made a guest appearance as himself in an episode of Brookside, the Liverpool based TV soap opera on Channel 4 which was aired on 14 January 1994.

== Bibliography ==
- Bruce Grobbelaar, More than Somewhat: Autobiography, Collins Willow, 1986 ISBN 0-00-218188-6
- Bruce Grobbelaar and Ragnhild Lund Ansnes; Life in a Jungle: My Autobiography, deCoubertin Books, 2018 ISBN 9781909245570
