= Bristol and District Football League =

Association football league in England

- Founded: 1892; 134 years ago
- Country: England
- Divisions: 5
- Number of clubs: 61
- Feeder to: Bristol Premier Combination
- Promotion to: Bristol Premier Combination Division 1
- Current champions: Senior: Made For Ever; One: Bristol Boys; Two: Shirehampton A Three: Bristol Boys Reserves; Four: Hanham Athletic A League Cup: Made For Ever; League Trophy: Wick Res (2025-26)
- Website: Official Website – The FA.com

The Bristol and District Football League currently known as the uhlsport Bristol and District Football League is a football competition based in Bristol, England. The top division in this league, which is the Senior Division, is a feeder to the Bristol Premier Combination. The league has a total of five divisions and is affiliated to the Gloucestershire County FA.

The Bristol and Avon League feeds into the Bristol and District League.

== History ==
The Bristol and District League was originally formed in 1892 on the suggestion of Gloucester City player Percy Stout, although Gloucester did not join the league until the following season. The league became known as the Western Football League in 1895, but the name Bristol and District League has been a familiar title in Bristol football in subsequent years.

Among the clubs that have left the Bristol and District League to compete at a higher level are:

- Bitton
- Bristol St George (now known as Roman Glass St. George)
- Cadbury Heath
- Clevedon (now known as Clevedon Town)
- Keynsham Town
- Lawrence Weston Athletic (now known as Hallen)
- Longwell Green Sports
- Mangotsfield United
- Oldland (now known as Oldland Abbotonians)
- Winterbourne United
- Yate YMCA (now known as Yate Town)

== Member clubs 2024–25 ==
=== Senior Division ===
- AEK Boco 'A'
- AFC Mangotsfield District
- Bradley Stoke Town Reserves
- De Veys
- Hallen 'A'
- Hanham Athletic Reserves
- Iron Acton Reserves
- Longwell Green Sports Development
- Nicholas Wanderers Reserves
- Pucklechurch Sports
- Stockwood Wanderers Reserves
- Totterdown United Reserves
- Winterbourne United Reserves

=== Division One ===
- Chipping Sodbury Town Development
- DRG Frenchay Reserves
- Hambrook & Brimsham United Reserves
- Hanham Abbotonians
- Highridge United Reserves
- Lawrence Weston
- Longwell Green Sports 'B'
- Made For Ever
- Redfield Rovers
- Sea Mills Park
- Seymour United
- Shaftesbury Crusade Reserves
- Tormarton

=== Division Two ===
- Bedminster Down Reserves
- Bitton Reserves
- Bristol Boys
- FC Rangers
- Fry Club 'A'
- Greyfriars Athletic Reserves
- Iron Acton 'A'
- Olveston United Reserves
- Pucklechurch Sports Reserves
- Shirehampton 'A'
- Thornbury Town 'A'

=== Division Three ===
- Bradley Stoke Town 'A'
- Bristol Barcelona Reserves
- Bristol United
- De Veys Reserves
- FC United of Yate
- Hengrove 88
- Made For Ever Reserves
- Nicholas Wanderers 'A'
- Oldland Abbotonians Colts
- Real St George
- Saltford 'A'
- Wick 'A'

=== Division Four ===
- AFC Mangotsfield District Reserves
- Bristol Boys Reserves
- FC United of Yate Reserves
- Greyfriars Athletic 'A'
- Hanham Athletic 'A'
- Lion Reserves
- Real St George Reserves
- Redfield Rovers Reserves
- Seymour United Reserves
- Shaftesbury Crusade 'A'
- Stockwood Green Reserves
- Tormarton Reserves

== Recent Champions ==
Season	Senior Division	Division One	Division Two	Division Three	Division Four	Division Five	Division Six
2003–04	Fishponds Athletic	Talbot Knowle	Avonmouth Village	Chipping Sodbury Reserves	Soundwell Victoria	Longshore Reserves	Soundwell Victoria Reserves
2004–05	Patchway Town Reserves	Sea Mills Park Reserves	Hillfields Old Boys Reserves	Soundwell Victoria	Greyfriars Athletic Reserves	Frys 'B'	Eden Grove
2005–06	Talbot Knowle	Avonmouth Village	Lawrence Rovers	Greyfriars Athletic Reserves	Hallen 'B'	Eden Grove	Longwell Green Sports 'B'
2006–07	Avonmouth Village	Soundwell Victoria	Roman Glass St George 'A'	Old Sodbury	Brislington Cricketers	Shaftesbury Crusaders 'A'	Bradley Stoke Town
2007–08	Longwell Green Sports Reserves	Chipping Sodbury Town Reserves	Old Sodbury	Brislington Cricketers	Hanham Athletic 'A'	Impact Squad	Portville Warriors
2008–09	Lawrence Rovers	Old Sodbury	Seymour United Reserves	Eden Grove	Bradley Stoke Town	Henbury 'B'	Southmead Community Sports (Sat)
2009–10	Made For Ever	Brislington Cricketers	Eden Grove	DRG Stapleton Reserves	St. George Rangers	Soundwell Victoria	Patchway North End
2010–11	Old Sodbury	Eden Grove	DRG Stapleton Reserves	Portville Warriors	Soundwell Victoria	Real Thornbury	Sea Mills Park Reserves
2011–12	Brislington Cricketers	Warmley Saints	Portville Warriors	Lebeq Reserves	Real Thornbury	Sea Mills Park Reserves	Broadlands
2012–13	Sea Mills Park	AEK Boco Reserves	Totterdown United Reserves	Real Thornbury	South Bristol Central	Old Sodbury Reserves	Rangeworthy Reserves
2013–14	AEK Boco Reserves	Hambrook	Real Thornbury	Stapleton	Highridge United Reserves	Staple Hill Orient	Stapleton Reserves
2014–15	Talbot Knowle United	Bradley Stoke Town	Stapleton	Hillfields Old Boys	Staple Hill Orient	Stoke Lane	Yate Athletic Reserves
2015–16	Chipping Sodbury Reserves	Stapleton	Hillfields Old Boys	Stoke Lane	Rangeworthy Reserves	Winterbourne United 'A'	
2016–17	Stapleton	Hillfields Old Boys	Yate Athletic	Lawrence Rovers	De Veys Reserves	Hillfields Old Boys Reserves	
2017–18	Iron Acton	AEK Boco 'A'	Bendix	University of Bristol	Hillfields Old Boys Reserves	Stokeside FC	
2018–19	Nicholas Wanderers	Fry Club 'A'	Highridge United Reserves	Hillfields Old Boys Reserves	Fry Club 'B'	Winterbourne Reserves	
2019–20	abandoned due to Covid-19 pandemic						
2020–21	abandoned due to Covid-19 pandemic						
2021–22	AEK Boco 'A'	Bristol Barcelona	Pucklechurch Sports Reserves	AFC Mangotsfield District Reserves	Hallen 'A'	Redfield Rovers	
2022–23	Thornbury Town Reserves	Pucklechurch Sports	AFC Mangotsfield Reserves	Hallen 'A'	Real St George	FC Rangers	
2023–24	Bedminster Down	Hanham Athletic Res	Redfield Rovers	FC Rangers	Bristol Boys		
2024–25	AFC Mangotsfield District First	Shaftesbury Crusade Reserves	FC Rangers	FC United of Yate	Real St George		
2024–26	Made For Ever	Bristol Boys	Shirehampton A	Bristol Boys Res	Hanham Athletic A		
