= Bristol Premier Combination =

Association Football league in England

- Founded: 1957
- Country: England
- Divisions: 2
- Number of clubs: 27
- Feeder to: Gloucestershire County League
- Promotion to: Gloucestershire County League
- Relegation to: Bristol and District League Senior Division
- League cup: League:
- Current champions: Premier: Iron Acton; One: Old Sodbury; League Cup: Bristol Barcelona (2025–26)
- Website: Bristol Premier Combination Football League

The Bristol Premier Combination currently known as the uhlsport Bristol Premier Combination Football League is a football competition based in and around Bristol, England. The league is affiliated to the Gloucestershire County FA, and it has two divisions, the Premier Division and Premier One. The Premier Division is one of three feeders to the Gloucestershire County League. In turn, the Bristol Premier Combination is fed by the Bristol and District League.

== History ==
The league was formed in 1957 and at one stage was known as the County of Avon Premier Combination.

Among the clubs that have left the Bristol Premier Combination and now compete at a higher level are:

- Bitton
- Bristol St George (now known as Roman Glass St. George)
- Cadbury Heath
- Clevedon (now known as Clevedon Town)
- Keynsham Town
- Lawrence Weston Hallen (now known as Hallen)
- Longwell Green Sports
- Mangotsfield United
- Mendip United (now known as Mendip Broadwalk)
- Oldland (now known as Oldland Abbotonians)
- Yate YMCA (now known as Yate Town)

== 2025–26 Members ==
=== Premier ===
- ~~Bradley Stoke Town~~
- Bristol Barcelona
- DRG SV Frenchay
- Greyfriars Athletic
- Hallen Reserves
- Iron Acton
- Longwell Green Sports Reserves
- Nicholas Wanderers
- Olveston United
- Patchway Town
- Shaftesbury Crusade
- Shirehampton Reserves
- Thornbury Town Reserves
- Winterbourne United

=== Division One ===
- AEK Boco Reserves
- AFC Mangotsfield
- Bedminster Down
- Bendix
- Chipping Sodbury Town Reserves
- Cribbs 'A'
- Hambrook & Brimsham United
- Hillside
- Lion
- Old Sodbury
- Oldland Abbotonians Reserves
- Pucklechurch Sports
- Winterbourne United Reserves

== Recent champions ==
Season	Premier Division	Division One
2003–04	Sea Mills Park	Longshore
2004–05	Hallen Reserves	Brimsham Green
2005–06	Hanham Athletic	Chipping Sodbury Town
2006–07	Nicholas Wanderers	Winterbourne United Reserves
2007–08	Chipping Sodbury Town	Mendip United
2008–09	Mendip United	Longwell Green Sports Reserves
2009–10	Longwell Green Sports Reserves	Seymour United
2010–11	Mendip United	Totterdown United
2011–12	Mendip United	Shaftesbury Crusade
2012–13	Longwell Green Sports Reserves	Highridge United
2013–14	Mendip United	Edden Grove
2014–15	Mendip United	Bitton Reserves
2015–16	Mendip Broadwalk	Talbot Knowle United
2016-17	Cribbs Reserves	Shaftesbury Crusade
2017-18	Olveston United	Seymour United
2018-19	Cribbs Reserves	Winterbourne United First
2019-20	Cribbs Reserves	Bristol Manor Farm Reserves
2021-22	Cribbs Reserves	Bradley Stoke Town
2022–23	Hanham Athletic	Wick Reserves
2023–24	Totterdown United	Shirehampton Reserves
2024–25	Winterbourne United	Bristol Barcelona
2025–26	Iron Acton	Old Sodbury
