= Patchway Town F.C. =

Association football club in England

Patchway Town
- Full name: Patchway Town Football Club
- Nickname: The Patch
- Founded: 1958
- Ground: Scott Park, Coniston Road, Patchway
- Chairman: Andrew England
- Manager: Rich Lee
- League: Bristol Premier Combination Premier Division
- 2024–25: Bristol Premier Combination Premier Division, 12th of 13
Home colours	Away colours

Patchway Town Football Club is a football club based in Patchway, Gloucestershire, England. They played in the FA Vase during the 1980s and 1990s. They are currently members of the Bristol Premier Combination Premier Division. The club is a FA Charter Standard Club affiliated to the Gloucestershire County Football Association.

== History ==
The club was established in 1958 under the name of Old Patchwegians and started out in the Bristol & District League. In 1968 the Club became founding members of the Gloucestershire County League. In 1973 the club changed its name to Patchway. The end of the 1979–80 season saw the club finish bottom of the league, and leave the league. The club returned to the Gloucestershire County League at the start of the 1985–86 season, winning the league in their first season back. The next season saw the club enter the FA Vase for the first time, and getting knocked out in the preliminary qualifying round by Lymington.

In 1991 the club changed its name to Patchway Town, with the first season under this name saw them winning the Gloucestershire County League for the second time. The 2002–03 season saw the club win their third league title. The following four seasons saw the club win the League Cup three times.

== Ground ==
The clubs home ground is at Norman Scott Park in Patchway, Bristol.

== Honours ==
- Gloucestershire County League
  - champions (3) 1985–86, 1991–92, 2002–03
- Gloucestershire County League Cup
  - Winners (3) 2003–04, 2004–05, 2006–07
