= Winterbourne United F.C. =

Association football club in England

Coordinates: 51°31′28.03″N 2°30′16.10″W

Winterbourne United
- Full name: Winterbourne United Football Club
- Nickname: The Bourne
- Founded: 1911 (as Winterbourne Wasps)
- Ground: Oaklands Park, Almondsbury
- Chairman: Robyn Maggs
- League: Bristol Premier Combination Premier Division
- 2025–26: Bristol Premier Combination Premier Division, 4th of 13
Home colours	Away colours

Winterbourne United Football Club is a football club based in Winterbourne, near Bristol, England. Affiliated to the Gloucestershire County FA, they are the current double champions of the Bristol Premier Combination Premier Division and the BPC League Cup.

== History ==
Winterbourne United Football Club, formerly known as Winterbourne Wasps until the outbreak of the First World War, was formed in 1911, the first club secretary being Fred Tolley.

The Club entered the Bristol and Suburban League and enjoyed one of the most successful periods in their history. They finished as runners up in the league no less than four times during the 1930s and in the 1933–34 season reached the semi-finals of the G.F A Senior Amateur Cup, losing to Victoria Albion at the Douglas Ground, Kingswood. In the home quarter final against Dockland Settlement over 2000 paid to watch the game.

During the Second World War, the local Home Guard kept football going in the village until peacetime.

In 1950–51, the Club joined the Bristol & District League and were relegated in their first season. A period of rebuilding followed which took longer than anticipated as there were a limited number of players in the villages of Winterbourne, Watleys End and Frampton Cotterell. However the rebuilding both of the team and the changing rooms paid dividends and season 1967–68 saw the Club move into senior football as it won the Bristol & District League Division One Championship and the G.F.A Intermediate Cup, along with the Berkeley Hospital Senior Cup.

This success brought promotion to the Bristol Premier Combination and three years later, 1970–71, the Club won the Second Division Championship and the Cossham Hospital Premier Cup.

Winterbourne continued membership of the County of Avon Premier Combination until their most successful season, 1991–92, winning the Premier Combination Cup, and finished runners up to Hlghridge United in the Premier Division. As a result, the Club gained promotion to the Gloucestershire County League for the first time. During that season strength of the club was evident as the Reserves team won the Bristol & District League First Division title and also carried off both the Premier and Senior Berkeley Hospital Cups.

A poor season in 1995–96 saw the Club relegated from the Gloucestershire County League back to the Bristol Premier Combination despite reaching the G.F.A. Challenge Trophy semi-finals for the first time. The slump did not last long as just one year later the Club marched back into the County League by winning the 'double'. After beating Highridge United 2–1 in the final to win the G.F.A. Senior Amateur Cup, they clinched promotion by winning the Premier Combination championship by 7 clear points from their nearest rivals Hambrook.

In season 1998–99 the Reserves won the Bristol & District League Senior Division to gain promotion to the Premier Combination and two years later in 2000/2001 the first team finished as Champions of the Gloucestershire County League to gain promotion to the Hellenic League.

In season 2005–06 saw the club's most successful season when they won the Hellenic League Div1 West losing just 5 out of their 34 games and scoring 98 goals.

There is also another “A” team that Winterbourne plays in Division 3 of the Bristol and District League. The squad mainly comprises players from the youth academy or those who are young along with a few experienced players.

In November 2009, Nick Tanner was appointed manager. On 18 November 2009 it was confirmed that former Liverpool goalkeeper and colleague of Tanner, Bruce Grobbelaar had agreed to play in a one-off cup tie against local rivals Patchway in a Gloucestershire FA County Cup match on 5 December. Eventually Grobbelaar did not play the game although he attended at the club's Parkside Avenue ground. Grobbelaar took part in a half-time penalty shootout competition. Winterbourne lost the game to Patchway 1–0. In August 2011, Tanner resigned from his position as manager of the club.

For the 2012–13 season the club was transferred to the Western League Premier Division. However, they resigned from the league midway through the 2015–16 season, with the reserves in the Premier Division of the Bristol Premier Combination becoming the first team.

In the summer of 2024, manager, Tim Minihane, and assistant, James Betts, were appointed to guide the club into revitalising new chapter. The duo achieved instant success in their maiden 2024-25 season, winning the Bristol Premier Combination League Cup in early April, and securing the Bristol Premier Combination - Premier Division title just two weeks later, rendering the final game of the season versus rivals DRG Stapleton, a promotion party.

== Honours ==
- Hellenic Football League Division One West
  - Champions 2005–06, 2007–08
- Gloucestershire County League
  - Champions 2000–01
- Bristol Premier Combination - Premier Division
  - Champions 2024–25
- Bristol Premier Combination League - League Cup
  - Champions 2023–24
  - Champions 2024–25

== Records ==
- FA Vase
  - Second Round 2011–12
