= Cribbs F.C. =

Association football club in England

Coordinates: 51°30′58.482″N 2°37′39.421″W

Cribbs
- Full name: Cribbs Football Club
- Nickname: Cribbs
- Founded: 1958 (as Sun Life Assurance)
- Ground: The Lawns, South Gloucestershire
- Capacity: 1,000 (100 seated)
- Chairman: Nick Veale
- Manager: Ryan Crouch
- League: Hellenic League Premier Division
- 2025–26: Hellenic League Premier Division, 19th of 20
Home colours	Away colours

Cribbs Football Club is an English football club founded in 1958 and based at Cribbs Causeway, South Gloucestershire. They are currently members of Hellenic League Premier Division and are affiliated to the Gloucestershire County FA.

== History ==
Cribbs Football Club was founded in London in 1958 as Sun Life Assurance. The Bristol team was established in 1976 when Sun Life first relocated to Bristol. Initially, two teams were run, participating in the Bristol and Avon League, playing at Dundridge Farm. However, when the Cribbs Causeway ground was opened in 1978, the first team were promoted straight to the Avon Premier Combination League (later renamed Bristol Premier Combination) where they stayed for 20 years until they eventually won promotion to the County League in 1999–2000. In the summer of 2011, the club changed from AXA to its new name of Cribbs Friends Life FC ready for the 2011–12 season.

The 2011–12 season was Cribbs' most successful season to date as the club claimed its first Gloucestershire County League title on its way to an unprecedented League and Cup double, with the team later adding the Les James League Cup to the League Championship, in the process becoming the first and only side to achieve this feat. As well as winning the double, the club finally earned promotion to the Western League Division One for the 2012–13 season as a result of being crowned champions. The season turned out to be a successful one for the club in general as the Reserve and 'A' sides also gained promotion.

In 2013, Cribbs Friends Life F.C. changed their name to Cribbs F.C. after losing the backing of their sponsors. At the end of the 2020–21 season the club were transferred to the Premier Division of the Hellenic League Under the stewardship of Richard Luffman, Cribbs in his first season in charge recorded a best ever placed finish of Fourth in the Hellenic League, they also were winners of the League Cup defeating Hereford Pegasus 1-0 through a George Kellow goal.

Luffman's Cribbs gained Southern League status in 2023 after clinching promotion becoming champions of the Hellenic League after a 1–0 win over Wantage Town through a goal from David Duru, their highest promotion in club history.

== Other sides ==
Today the club runs three Saturday sides, spread across the Southern League, Western Football League and the Bristol Premier Combination, one veterans' side who play in the Bristol Casuals League and an U18 side that plays in the Bristol U18s' Combination League.

In season 2018/2019, the reserve side completed a unique treble by winning the Bristol Premier Combination League and Cup along with success in the Gloucestershire FA Senior Amateur Cup.

The 1st XI also won the Gloucestershire FA Challenge Trophy in 2018/2019 with success against Bishop's Cleeve FC.

== Ground ==
Cribbs play their home matches at The Lawns, Station Road, Henbury, Bristol, BS10 7TB.

The grounds consist of 3 full size grass football pitches and a 3G astro turf.

The 1st team pitch and surrounding area is fully compliant with FA ground grading requirements for the Hellenic League. Hard standing surrounds the pitch in addition to a perimeter barrier. The ground consists of a 50-seater stand with room for an additional 100 standing which was built in 2013 and a 50-seater stand built in 2018. During the 2021–22 season a new perimeter fence was constructed along with a turnstile.

Until April 2020 The Lawns was for a number of years the training base for Bristol Rovers.

== Club personnel ==
- First team manager: Jack Harding-Dancy
- Assistant manager: Ash Kendall
- First Team Coach: Liam O’Donoghue
- Captain: Matt Binding
- Vice Captain: Oscar Sullivan and Keiran Clayton

== Honours ==
- Hellenic League Premier Division:
  - Winners (1): 2022–23
- Hellenic League Cup:
  - Winners (1): 2021–22
- Gloucestershire County League GFA Challenge Trophy:
  - Winners (1): 2018–19

== Records ==
- Best FA Cup performance: Second qualifying round, 2023–24
- Best FA Vase performance: Fourth Round Proper, 2018–19
- Best FA Trophy performance: First round, 2023–24
- Highest Attendance - 837 v Bristol Manor Farm 23/24 Play-off
