= Gloucestershire County Football League =

Association football league in England

- Founded: 1968; 58 years ago
- Country: England
- Number of clubs: 17
- Level on pyramid: Level 11
- Promotion to: Hellenic League Division One; Western League Division One
- Relegation to: Bristol & Suburban League; Bristol Premier Combination; Gloucestershire Northern Senior League
- Current champions: Sharpness (2025–26)
- Website: Official website

The Gloucestershire County Football League is a football league in England, founded in 1968. The league is affiliated to the Gloucestershire County FA.

It sits at step 7 (or level 11) of the National League System and is a feeder to Divisions One of the Hellenic League and Western League. Clubs to move from the GCL to the Hellenic League in recent seasons are Brimscombe & Thrupp, Longlevens and Tuffley Rovers. The league has always consisted of a single division of clubs. In the 2023–24 season, 16 teams will compete in the league.

The Bristol & Suburban League, Bristol Premier Combination, and the Gloucestershire Northern Senior League feed the Gloucestershire County League.

== Administration ==
The League has a maximum size of 18 member clubs, who have to be affiliated to the Gloucestershire Football Association.

The club's ground or headquarters have to be located within the County of Gloucestershire or in those parts of the City of Bristol that were within the 1908 city boundaries.

The league is part of the National League system and clubs may apply for promotion to or from the League.

The Joint Liaison Committee, at the end of each season, confirms promotion and relegation of clubs between the leagues and is responsible for the boundary adjustments between the leagues where appropriate. The committee is drawn from the Western Football League, Gloucestershire County League, Somerset County League, South West Peninsula League and the Wiltshire League.

== History ==
The league was originally formed in 1968. Its first chairman was F.Dowling, who was ably assisted by the Hon. Secretary, L.V. James. Les James has the Leagues' Cup Competition named after him in recognition of his service to football and the league within Gloucestershire. Chairman, Mr F. Dowling, presented the championship trophy to Stonehouse, who were the first winners of the County League.

Among the clubs that left the Gloucestershire County League and which now compete, or have competed, at a higher level are:

- Almondsbury
- Bishop's Cleeve
- Brimscombe & Thrupp
- Bitton
- Bristol St George (now known as Roman Glass St. George)
- Bristol Telephones
- Cadbury Heath
- Cinderford Town
- Cirencester Town
- Fairford Town
- Cribbs Friends Life (now known as Cribbs)
- Forest Green Rovers
- Lawrence Weston Hallen (now known as Hallen)
- Longlevens
- Longwell Green Sports
- Lydney Town
- Newent Town
- Oldland (now known as Oldland Abbotonians)
- Slimbridge
- Shortwood United
- Thornbury Town
- Tuffley Rovers
- Tytherington Rocks
- Winterbourne United
- Yate Town

Former members of the County League that have dropped back into local football include:

- Harrow Hill joined the County League in 1982/83 and gained promotion to the Hellenic Football League in 1995/96 but have now returned to the Gloucestershire Northern Senior League.

== Member clubs for 2026–27 season ==
- AFC Mangotsfield
- Bishops Cleeve Development
- Broadwell Amateurs
- Bromley Heath United
- Chalford
- Filton Athletic
- Frampton United
- Henbury & Rockleaze
- Longlevens Reserves
- Quedgeley Wanderers
- Ruardean Hill Rangers
- Stoke Gifford SGS United
- Tewkesbury Town
- Totterdown United
- University of Bristol
- Wick

== List of champions ==
- 1968–69 – Stonehouse Town
- 1969–70 – Bristol St George
- 1970–71 – Cadbury Heath
- 1971–72 – Cadbury Heath
- 1972–73 – Cadbury Heath
- 1973–74 – Cadbury Heath
- 1974–75 – Matson Athletic
- 1975–76 – Matson Athletic
- 1976–77 – Almondsbury Greenway
- 1977–78 – Almondsbury Greenway
- 1978–79 – Almondsbury Greenway
- 1979–80 – Almondsbury Greenway
- 1980–81 – Almondsbury Greenway
- 1981–82 – Shortwood United
- 1982–83 – Old Georgians
- 1983–84 – Sharpness
- 1984–85 – Old Georgians
- 1985–86 – Patchway
- 1986–87 – Old Georgians
- 1987–88 – Old Georgians
- 1988–89 – Lawrence Weston Hallen
- 1989–90 – Ellwood
- 1990–91 – Tuffley Rovers
- 1991–92 – Patchway Town
- 1992–93 – Hallen
- 1993–94 – Cadbury Heath
- 1994–95 – Henbury Old Boys
- 1995–96 – DRG
- 1996–97 – Old Georgians
- 1997–98 – Cadbury Heath
- 1998–99 – Cadbury Heath
- 1999–00 – Highridge United
- 2000–01 – Winterbourne United
- 2001–02 – Roman Glass St. George
- 2002–03 – Patchway Town
- 2003–04 – Almondsbury
- 2004–05 – Highridge United
- 2005–06 – Lydney Town
- 2006–07 – Roman Glass St. George
- 2007–08 – Hardwicke
- 2008–09 – Slimbridge
- 2009–10 – Thornbury Town
- 2010–11 – Brimscombe & Thrupp
- 2011–12 – Cribbs Friends Life
- 2012–13 – Longlevens
- 2013–14 – Longlevens
- 2014–15 – Cheltenham Civil Service
- 2015–16 – AEK Boco
- 2016–17 – Bristol Telephones
- 2017–18 – Thornbury Town
- 2018–19 – Lebeq United
- 2019–20 – Not completed due to the COVID-19 pandemic
- 2020–21 – Not completed due to the COVID-19 pandemic
- 2021–22 – Wick
- 2022–23 – Cribbs Reserves
- 2023–24 – Avonmouth
- 2024–25 – Almondsbury
- 2025–26 – Sharpness
