= Thornbury Town F.C. =

Association football club in England

Coordinates: 51.605815°N 2.5307773°W

Thornbury Town
- Full name: Thornbury Town F.C.
- Founded: 1898
- Ground: Mundy Playing Fields, Thornbury
- Chairman: Jake Shutler
- Manager: Vacant
- League: Hellenic League Premier Division
- 2024–25: Hellenic League Premier Division, 12th of 20
Home colours	Away colours

Thornbury Town Football Club is a football club located in Thornbury, South Gloucestershire, England. They are currently members of the Hellenic League Premier Division and play at the Mundy Playing Fields.

The club is affiliated to the Gloucestershire County FA and is a FA Charter Standard Club.

As well as a first and reserve team, the club also operates youth teams from Under 6s to Under 18s. The youth teams were part of Thornbury Falcons until they merged in 2010 with the adults team and adopted the "Thornbury Town" name.

== History ==
The exact date of the formation of the club is uncertain, but there are records of football being played in the late 1800s, with the first mention of "Thornbury Town" in 1898. Before the outbreak of World War I, Thornbury played in the Dursley & Wotton League, with records of games against Chipping Sodbury Town, Wickwar and Westbury Park. During this time Dr. E. M. Grace, elder brother of W G Grace, played for the team.

After the war, the club re-formed and joined the Bristol and Suburban League. The club played in what is now the upper end of The Castle School Sixth Form Playing Field, on a pitch surrounded by an iron fence. They used changing rooms at a social club on the High Street which is now the Thornbury branch of HSBC.

In 1933, multiple clubs in the area merged to form Thornbury Sports, later becoming Thornbury A.F.C., and later, Thornbury Town A.F.C.

At the end of World War II, the club moved to its current home at the Mundy Playing Fields. After using various establishments for changing room facilities, a pavilion at the playing fields was built in 1964. After playing in the Bristol and District League, they became founding members of the Bristol Premier Combination, winning the league in the 1956–57 season.

In the 1968–69 season, the club became founding members of the Gloucestershire County League and in the following season recorded attendances in excess of 500 spectators. In 1971, the club was accepted into the Western Football League after finishing third in the County League. However, the Mundy Playing Fields didn't meet the requirements, therefore, the club remained in the county until their relegation to the Bristol Premier Combination in 1977.

The club returned to the Gloucestershire County League in 2002 after many steady, but unsuccessful, seasons in the Bristol Premier Combination, finally winning the title by 13 points. The club finally won their first County League title in 2009–10, but history repeated itself with the club unable to make the step up to a higher level due to lack of facilities at the Mundys. That summer, the local youth football team, Thornbury Falcons, merged with Thornbury Town in a bid to cement the long term tradition of developing local youth talent.

After the title winning season in 2009–10, Thornbury Town struggled to repeat the success and went through multiple changes of management in the following seasons. Under the stewardship of Andy Davies, the club won the Les James League Cup for the first time beating league winners, Cheltenham Civil Service 1–0. That season the club also finished in a respectable 4th place, which they repeated for the next two seasons.

In 2017–18, the club finally improved on their three consecutive fourth-place finishes, winning the league for a second time. The club also completed the double by winning the Les James League Cup for a second time, beating Frampton United 1–0. Work behind the scenes by committee members, meant the club were also in a position to apply for promotion to Step 6 of the Non-League System after receiving planning permission for a 50-seater stand, floodlights and perimeter fencing. The club's application was successful and they were placed in the Hellenic Football League Division One West for the 2018–19 season. The improvements to the Mundy Playing Fields were officially opened by the Mayor of Thornbury, Shirley Holloway on Tuesday 23 October 2018 before Thornbury Town's Hellenic League Subsidiary Cup game against local rivals Tytherington Rocks, which they won 6–0. After staying in the race for the top spot until the final weeks, the club finished in a respectable 3rd place behind Easington Sports and Cheltenham Saracens. Thornbury also finished the season winning the league's Supplementary Cup, beating Wallingford Town 2–1 at the ASM Stadium in Thame.

Ahead of the 2019–20 season, manager Andy Davies announced he was stepping aside as first team manager to take a break from football management, ending Thornbury Town's most successful era. Former player Jason Rees and ex-Gloucester City player Gary Kemp were announced as the new management team.

On 12 July 2019, it was announced that the club would take part in the FA Cup and FA Vase for the first time in the club's history, falling at the first hurdle against Leighton Town in the FA Cup, whilst reaching the second round in the FA Vase.

In Summer 2021, as part of a restructure of the Hellenic League, the club successfully applied for promotion to the Hellenic League Premier Division after finishing 2nd.

In June 2022, manager Jason Rees and assistant Gary Kemp stepped down from their positions. They were replaced by joint-managers Andy Parry and Richard Joyce. However, during the season Andy Parry stepped down leaving Joyce to remain as Manager, with former assistant manager Gary Kemp returning to the club. At the end of the 2024-25 season the club achieved its highest ever final standing in its history with a 12th place finish in the Hellenic Premier Division.

=== Season-by-season record ===
Season	Division	Position	Notes
1968-69	Gloucestershire County League	14th	
1969-70	Gloucestershire County League	14th	
1970-71	Gloucestershire County League	17th	
1971-72	Gloucestershire County League	17th	
1972-73	Gloucestershire County League	6th	
1973-74	Gloucestershire County League	14th	
1974-75	Gloucestershire County League	15th	
1975-76	Gloucestershire County League	8th	
1976-77	Gloucestershire County League	16th	Dropped out of the league
1977-2001	Bristol Premier Combination Premier Division	Records Unknown	
2001-02	Bristol Premier Combination Premier Division	1st	Champions, promoted
2002-03	Gloucestershire County League	7th	
2003-04	Gloucestershire County League	7th	
2004-05	Gloucestershire County League	6th	
2005-06	Gloucestershire County League	10th	
2006-07	Gloucestershire County League	17th	
2007-08	Gloucestershire County League	11th	
2008-09	Gloucestershire County League	9th	
2009-10	Gloucestershire County League	1st	Champions
2010-11	Gloucestershire County League	13th	
2011-12	Gloucestershire County League	16th	
2013-14	Gloucestershire County League	16th	
2014-15	Gloucestershire County League	4th	
2015-16	Gloucestershire County League	4th	
2016-17	Gloucestershire County League	4th	
2017-18	Gloucestershire County League	1st	Champions, promoted
2018-19	Hellenic League Division One West	3rd	
2019-20	Hellenic League Division One West	Results Expunged	
2020-21	Hellenic League Division One West	2nd	Promoted
2021-22	Hellenic League Premier Division	14th	
2022-23	Hellenic League Premier Division	16th	
2023-24	Hellenic League Premier Division	18th	
2024-25	Hellenic League Premier Division	12th	

== Current staff ==
Position	Name
President	Paul Wisbey
Chairman	Jake Shutler
Vice-chairman	Luke Jones
Secretaries	Mike Pengelly & Pam Howard
1st XI Managers	Richard Joyce
1st XI Assistant	Gary Kemp
2nd XI Manager	Jake Shutler
2nd XI Assistant	Simon Evans
3rd XI Manager	Joe Cobb
3rd XI Assistant	George Bush
3rd XI Linesman	Alex Evans
3rd XI Security Guard	Dom Ball
3rd XI Penalty Taker	Matt Chapman

== Honours ==
- Hellenic League
  - Supplementary Cup Winners 2018–19
- Gloucestershire County League
  - Champions 2009–10, 2017–18
  - Les James League Cup Winners 2014–15, 2017–18
- Bristol Premier Combination
  - Premier Division Champions 1956–57, 2001–02
  - Division Two Champions 1965–66
- Bristol & District League
  - Division Three Champions 1949–50
- Harry Greening Memorial Trophy
  - Winners 2003–04

== Records ==
- Highest League Position – 12th, Hellenic League Premier Division (2024–25)
- Record Attendance – 570 vs Worcester City F.C. (9 April 2024)
- Best FA Cup Performance – Extra Preliminary Round (2019–20, 2021–22, 2022–23, 2023–24, 2024–25, 2025-26)
- Best FA Vase Performance – Second Round Proper (2019–20), (2022-23), (2024–25)
