= Hallen A.F.C. =

Association football club in England

Coordinates: 51°31′01.72″N 2°39′09.16″W

Hallen
- Full name: Hallen Association Football Club
- Nickname: The Armadillos
- Founded: 1949
- Ground: The Hallen Centre, Hallen
- Capacity: 2,000 (200 seated)
- Chairman: Lee Fairman
- Manager: Karl Baggaley
- League: Hellenic League Premier Division
- 2024–25: Western League Division One, 1st of 22 (promoted)
Home colours	Away colours

Hallen Association Football Club is a non league football club based in Hallen, near Bristol, England. Affiliated to the Gloucestershire County FA, they are currently members of the Hellenic League Premier Division and play at the Hallen Centre.

== History ==
The club was established in Lawrence Weston in 1949 under the name Lawrence Weston Athletic. They joined the Bristol & District Football League, later moving up to the Avon Premier Combination, which became the Bristol Premier Combination. In 1979 the club relocated to Hallen in order to meet the league's ground grading requirement and were renamed Lawrence Weston Hallen.

In 1982 Lawrence Weston Hallen gained promotion to the Gloucestershire County League. They were runners-up in 1987–88 and won the league the following season. In 1989–90 the club won the Gloucestershire Challenge Trophy, and at the end of the season the club adopted their current name. After winning both the Gloucestershire County League and the Gloucestershire Challenge Trophy in 1992–93, they were promoted to Division One of the Hellenic League. The club were Division One runners-up in 1996–97, earning promotion to the Premier Division.

In 2000 Hallen transferred to the Western League, dropping down a level into its Division One. However, they were Division One champions in 2003–04 and were promoted to the Premier Division. In 2009–10 the club won the league's Les Phillips Cup. They won the Gloucestershire Challenge Trophy for a third time in 2013–14. At the end of the 2020–21 season the club were transferred to the Premier Division of the Hellenic League. In 2021–22 they finished bottom of the Hellenic League Premier Division and were relegated to Division One of the Western League.

The 2024–25 season saw Hallen win the Division One title, earning promotion to the Premier Division of the Hellenic League.

== Ground ==
The club initially played at Kingsweston House, a former army camp, with a disused Nissen hut turned into changing rooms. The ground was rented from Bristol City Council, who later installed changing rooms in the basement of the House. When the site was needed by Bristol College of Technology, the club were moved to St Bedes playing fields in Lawrence Weston.

The club moved to the Hallen Centre on Moorhouse Lane in 1979 in order to meet ground grading requirements. In the mid-1990s floodlights were erected and the 200-seat Frank Fairman Stand was built.

== Honours ==
- Hellenic League
  - Division One champions 1996–97
- Western League
  - Division One champions 2003–04, 2024–25
  - Les Phillips Cup winners 2009–10
- Gloucestershire County League
  - Champions 1988–89, 1992–93
- Gloucestershire Challenge Trophy
  - Winners 1989–90, 1992–93, 2013–14
- Gloucestershire Junior Cup
  - Winners 1968–69

== Records ==
- Best FA Cup performance: Fourth qualifying round, 2004–05
- Best FA Vase performance: Semi-finals, 2025–26
- Record attendance: 1,756 vs Bristol City XI, 6 July 2019

== See also ==
- Hallen A.F.C. players
