= Mangotsfield United F.C. =

Football club based in South Gloucestershire, England

Coordinates: 51°28′58.24″N 2°28′53.63″W

Mangotsfield United
- Full name: Mangotsfield United Football Club
- Nicknames: 'The Field', 'The Mangos'
- Founded: 1951
- Ground: Cossham Street, Mangotsfield
- Capacity: 2,500 (300 seated)
- Chairman: Steve Brown
- Manager: Ollie Price
- League: Hellenic League Premier Division
- 2024–25: Hellenic League Premier Division, 4th of 20
| Home colours | Away colours |

Mangotsfield United Football Club is a football club based in Mangotsfield, South Gloucestershire, England. They are currently members of the Hellenic League Premier Division and play at Cossham Street.

== History ==
The club was formed in 1951 after Mangotsfield Football Club closed down its reserve team. The new club joined Division Seven of the Bristol & District League, going on to win the division at the first attempt and earning promotion to Division Six. They won Division Six in 1952–53 and were promoted to Division Four. The club went on to win Division Four, Division Three and Division Two in successive seasons to earn five consecutive promotions. After finishing fourth in Division One in 1956–57, the club moved up to Division One of the Bristol Premier Combination. Although they were relegated to Division Two at the end of the 1960–61 season, they were promoted back to Division One the following season.

Mangotsfield were Division One runners-up in 1964–65 and went on to win the league in 1968–69. In 1972 they moved up to the Western League, going on to win the league's Challenge Cup in 1973–74. When the league gained a second division in 1976, the club became members of the Premier Division. They were relegated to Division One in 1981–82 but were Division One runners-up the following season, earning an immediate promotion back to the Premier Division. The club won the Somerset Premier Cup in 1987–88 The club were Premier Division champions in 1990–91. In 1995–96 the club reached the semi-finals of the FA Vase; although they beat Clitheroe 1–0 at home, the away game ended in a 2–0 defeat, sending Clitheroe to Wembley.

After finishing as runners-up in the Premier Division in 1999–2000, Mangotsfield were promoted to the Western Division of the Southern League. After winning the Gloucestershire Senior Cup in 2002–03, they won the Western Division the following season, earning promotion to the Premier Division. However, after finishing bottom of the Premier Division in 2008–09, they were relegated back to Division One South & West. A third-place finish in 2010–11 saw them qualify for the promotion play-offs, but they were beaten 3–1 by Frome Town in the semi-finals. The club won the Gloucestershire Senior Cup again in 2012–13 and retained the trophy the following season.

In 2021–22 Mangotsfield finished second-from-bottom of Division One South, resulting in relegation to the Premier Division of the Hellenic League. The following season saw them win the Hellenic League's Floodlit Cup, defeating Pershore Town 2–0 in the final. In 2024–25 the club finished fourth in the Premier Division before losing 3–0 to Sporting Club Inkberrow in the play-off semi-finals.

== Honours ==
- Southern League
  - Division One West champions 2004–05
- Hellenic League
  - Floodlit Cup winners 2022–23
- Western League
  - Premier Division champions 1990–91
  - Challenge Cup winners 1973–74
- Bristol Premier Combination
  - Division One champions 1968–69
- Bristol & District League
  - Division Two champions 1955–56
  - Division Three champions 1954–55
  - Division Four champions 1953–54
  - Division Six champions 1952–53
  - Division Seven champions 1951–52
- Somerset Premier Cup
  - Winners 1987–88
- Gloucestershire Senior Cup
  - Winners 2002–03, 2012–13, 2013–14
- Gloucestershire Challenge Trophy
  - Winners 1984–85, 1986–87, 1990–91, 1993–94, 1996–97, 1999–2000, 2023–24
- Gloucestershire FA (South) Senior Amateur Cup
  - Winners 1968–69, 1975–76

== Records ==
- Best FA Cup Performance: Fourth qualifying round, 2000–01, 2001–02, 2003–04, 2009–10
- Best FA Trophy Performance: Fourth round, 2001–02
- Best FA Vase Performance: Semi-finals, 1995–96
- Record attendance: 1,253 vs Bath City, FA Cup third qualifying round, 1974
- Biggest win: 17–1 vs Hanham Sports, Bristol & District League, 1953
- Heaviest defeat: 13–3 vs Bristol City United, Bristol & District League Division One
- Most appearances: John Hill, over 600
- Most goals: John Hill

== See also ==
- Mangotsfield United F.C. players
- Mangotsfield United F.C. managers
