= Gloucestershire County Football Association =

Governing body of association football in Gloucestershire

- Formation: 1886
- Purpose: Football association
- Headquarters: Oaklands Park; Gloucester Road
- Location(s): Almondsbury Bristol BS32 4AG
- Coordinates: 51.548606°N 2.570901°W
- Chief Executive: David Neale
- Website: gloucestershirefa.com

The Gloucestershire County Football Association, also simply known as the Gloucestershire FA or GFA, is the governing body of football in the county of Gloucestershire. It was formed in 1886.

== History ==
The Gloucestershire County Football Association has developed from small beginnings in 1886 into an Association of more than 2000 affiliated teams and 20 affiliated Leagues. Key dates in the history of the Association are provided below:

1886: At a meeting in the Full Moon Hotel, Stokes Croft, Bristol on 7 September, the Gloucestershire Football Association was formed to be administered by a management committee. Gloucestershire's first president was the cricketer Dr W.G. Grace who was also an active referee.

1889–90: 33 clubs had affiliated to the county, which enabled a delegate to be sent to the Football Association.

1892: The association was running two Cup Competitions and playing five or six county matches a season with the first League commencing operations.

1898: The association's Management Committee became the council with representatives from 15 clubs and a representative from each League affiliated to the Association.

1919–20: A major change in the structure of the Council occurred when Northern Council was formed from areas north of Thornbury. However all decisions still had to be sanctioned by the full Council.

1927: The County Minor (Youth) Association was formulated.

1933: The responsibilities of the County Minor Association were assumed by the Main Council.

1946: The County Youth Association was revived following its demise in 1933.

1967: Moves were made to form an entirely separate Council in the North. But at a meeting in December it was agreed that two separate Associations were impractical. The immediate result was that a joint annual meeting was introduced in addition to the A.G.M.

1976: The last independent North and South Council meetings took place and in 1977 the Council again became a unified body.

1995: Following the sudden death of the long serving Hon. Secretary E J Marsh, the County appointed Paul Britton as full- time Secretary and shortly afterwards purchased the property at Oaklands Park, Almondsbury as its first permanent Headquarters.

1999: The County took the significant step of becoming a Limited Company becoming known as Gloucestershire Football Association Ltd.

2000: The development of Oaklands Park that included the addition of a Floodlit All-Weather Pitch and new Dressing Rooms was completed. These facilities are now being extensively used for training groups from local junior clubs and disabled organisations.

2001: The development of the All-Weather Pitch and Dressing Rooms released capacity within the original building for the development of office space, a Board Room and Council Chamber.

2002: The County Youth Association ceased to be a semi- autonomous Association when it was incorporated into the main Association as the Youth Committee.

2006: David Neale was appointed Chief Executive following the death of Paul Britton in December 2005.

== Oaklands Park ==
Oaklands Park was purchased by the Gloucestershire Football Association (GFA) for their new headquarters in 1994 after the existing owners Almondsbury Town FC was regretfully placed in the hands of the liquidator following a period of financial difficulties. Almondsbury Town FC became tenants at Oaklands Park in 1995 until May 2010, and in addition to using the pitch, the club were able to rent half of the building as a bar and skittle alley.

By 2009 the GFA established that they needed to take over this area for our their own use in order to cater for the increasing number of people employed by the Association in developing grassroots football. In addition to accommodating their staff, the GFA also needed training facilities to assist the development of clubs, coaches and referees.

The situation has eventually led to the demise of Almondsbury Town FC who in April 2011 announced that they were withdrawing from Zamaretto League's 2011–12 season and disbanding the first team citing failure to find a ground share as the main cause. In response the GFA released a statement advising that it was Almondsbury Town's decision to leave Oaklands Park, originally in April 2010, that prompted them to find new tenants and that an agreement had been struck with Winterbourne United and Roman Glass St George in October of that same year.

The situation has resulted in damaging publicity for the GFA in the local press. The Association have reiterated that their "main purpose as an organisation is to drive increased participation in football. As a direct result of the Oaklands Park refurbishment programme, (they) were able to host a team of four FA Tesco Skills Coaches". The GFA expressed disappointment that the club were unsuccessful in their discussions with other parties.

== Affiliated Leagues ==
=== Men's Saturday Leagues ===
- Gloucestershire County League (1968)
- Bristol & Avon League (1910)
- Bristol & District League (1892)
- Bristol & Suburban League (1894)
- Bristol Churches League (1992)
- Bristol Downs League (1905)
- Bristol Premier Combination League (1957)
- Cheltenham League (1899)
- Cirencester & District League (1921)
- Cotswold Churches League (2007)
- Gloucestershire Northern Senior League (1922)
- North Gloucestershire League (1907)
- Stroud & District League (1902)
- West Dean Charity League (1966)

=== Men's Sunday Leagues ===
- Bristol & District Sunday League (1966)
- Bristol & Wessex Sunday League (1980)
- Bristol Regional League (Sunday) (1963)
- Cheltenham Sunday League (1968)
- Gloucester & District Sunday League (1965)

=== Ladies & Girls Leagues ===
- Gloucestershire County Women's League (1998)
- Gloucester County Girls League (2000)
- Bristol Girls League (2001)

=== Youth Leagues ===
- Gloucestershire County Youth League (1985)
- Avon Youth League (1981)
- Hanham Minor League (1978)
- Bristol (U18) Football Combination League (1995)
- Bristol Saturday Youth League (2008)
- Cheltenham Youth League (1998)
- Cotswold Youth League (2005)
- Gloucester Youth League (1946–2016)
- Mid Gloucester Mini-Soccer League (1996)
- Severn Valley Youth League (2016)
- Stroud & District Youth League (1947–2016)

=== Small Sided Leagues ===
- 'Active 5aside' – Adult Indoor Football
- League South Gloucestershire

- Bradley Stoke
- Kingswood
- Thornbury
- Yate

- Champion Soccer

- Cheltenham

- Clifton College Sports Club

Summer 8-a-side League

- Goals – Bristol North
- Goals – Bristol South
- Pitch Invasion 5-a-side

- Bristol
- Cheltenham
- Gloucester

- Stroud

- Prostar Leagues

- Bristol – Ashton Park
- Bristol – Horfield
- Bristol – St George
- Gloucester
- Stroud
- Tewkesbury

=== Futsal Leagues ===
- BristolFutsal.com League

- Hanham

- Onside & Aspire Adult Futsal League

- Gloucester

=== Other Leagues ===
- Bristol Casuals League (Veterans)
- Gloucestershire & Somerset FA Ability Counts County League (2009)

== Disbanded or Amalgamated Leagues ==
A number of leagues that were affiliated to the Gloucestershire FA have disbanded or amalgamated including:

- Bristol Avon League (not to be confused with Bristol & Avon League)
- Bristol Church of England League (now known as Bristol & Avon League)
- Bristol Regional League (Saturday Competition)
- Bristol Wednesday League
- Dursley and District League
- Dursley and Wotton League
- Gloucester and District League
- Iron Acton and District League
- Forest of Dean League
- Mid Gloucestershire League
- Wotton and District League

== Affiliated Member Clubs ==
Among the notable clubs that are affiliated to the Gloucestershire FA are:

- Almondsbury UWE
- Almondsbury Town
- Bishop's Cleeve
- Bitton
- Brimscombe & Thrupp
- Bristol City
- Bristol Manor Farm
- Bristol Rovers
- Cadbury Heath
- Cheltenham Saracens
- Cheltenham Town
- Cinderford Town
- Cirencester Town
- Fairford Town
- Fintan FC
- Forest Green Rovers
- Gloucester City
- Hardwicke
- Hallen
- Harrow Hill
- Longwell Green Sports
- Lydney Town
- Mangotsfield United
- Newent Town
- Oldland Abbotonians
- Prestbury Phantoms AFC
- Quedgeley Wanderers
- Roman Glass St George
- Shortwood United
- Slimbridge
- Stonehouse Town
- Tuffley Rovers
- Tytherington Rocks
- Winchcombe Town
- Winterbourne United
- Yate Town

== Lists of Gloucestershire FA cup and trophy winners ==
=== Gloucestershire Senior Professional Cup ===
The Senior Professional Cup, initially known as the Challenge Cup and later as the Senior Challenge Cup, was held 99 times between 1888 and 1996. Founded in 1887, it was originally a knockout tournament for all teams affiliated to the Gloucestershire County Football Association, but after a few years became dominated by Bristol City and Bristol Rovers to such an extent that the format of the competition was changed in 1907 to be an annual match between those two clubs. A list of the winners is shown in the table below.

Club	Wins	First win	Last win
Bristol City	54	1898	1996
Bristol Rovers	28	1889	1994
Warmley	4	1892	1897
Bedminster	2	1891	1900
St George	2	1894	1895
Clifton Association	2	1888	1890

=== Challenge Trophy ===
Season	Winners
1978–79	Almondsbury Greenway
1979–80	Fairford Town
1980–81	Moreton Town
1981–82	Moreton Town
1982–83	Old Georgians
1983–84	Shortwood United
1984–85	Mangotsfield United
1985–86	Moreton Town
1986–87	Mangotsfield United
1987–88	: Bristol Manor Farm

Season	Winners
1988–89	Yate Town
1989–90	Lawrence Weston Hallen
1990–91	Mangotsfield United
1991–92	Shortwood United
1992–93	Hallen
1993–94	Mangotsfield United
1994–95	Shortwood United
1995–96	Cirencester United
1996–97	Mangotsfield United
1998–99	Fairford Town

Season	Winners
1999–00	Mangotsfield United
2000–01	Yate Town
2001–02	Cirencester Academy
2002–03	Fairford Town
2003–04	Slimbridge
2004–05	Harrow Hill
2005–06	Slimbridge
2006–07	Slimbridge
2007–08	Bitton
2008–09	Bitton

Season	Winners
2009–10	Almondsbury Town
2010–11	Shortwood United
2011–12	Bristol Manor Farm
2012–13	Bristol Academy
2013–14	Hallen
2014–15	Bristol Manor Farm
2015–16	Bristol Manor Farm

=== Senior Amateur Challenge Cup (South) ===
Season	Winners
1907–08	Kingswood Rovers
1908–09	Dominicans
1909–10	Hanham
1910–11	Hanham
1911–12	Hanham
1912–13	St. Michael's
1913–14	Packers
1915–19	No competition due to World War I
1919–20	Douglas
1920–21	Hanham Athletic
1921–22	St Philip's Marsh Adult School
1922–23	Victoria Albion
1923–24	Hanham Athletic
1924–25	Kingswood
1925–26	Brecknell Mun.& Rgrs.
1926–27	Kingswood
1927–28	Victoria Albion
1928–29	Barton Hill Sports
1929–30	Victoria Albion
1930–31	St. Phillip's Athletic
1931–32	Bristol St. George
1932–33	Victoria Albion
1933–34
1934–35	Mount Hill Enterprise
1935–36	Dockland Settlement
1936–37	St. Pancras (Knowle)
1937–38	Bristol Aeroplane Co.

Season	Winners
1938–39	Bristol St. George
1939–40	B.C.E.D.
1940–41	No competition due to World War II
1941–42	R.A.F. Filton
1942–43	Bristol Aeroplane Co.
1943–44	Bristol City "A"
1944–45	R.E.M.E.
1945–46	Douglas (Kingswood)
1946–47	St. Andrew's
1947–48	Hambrook
1948–49	Soundwell
1949–50	Bishopsworth Utd.
1950–51	Bristol St. George
1951–52	Victoria Athletic
1952–53	Bristol St. George
1953–54	St Philip's Marsh Adult School
1954–55	St Philip's Marsh Adult School
1955–56	Exeter United
1956–57	Southmead Sports
1957–58	Pucklechurch
1958–59	Clifton St. Vincent's
1959–60	Bristol Rovers
1960–61	Bristol St. George
1961–62	Clifton St. Vincent's
1962–63	Hambrook
1963–64	Bristol St. George
1964–65	Cadbury Heath

Season	Winners
1965–66	Bristol St. George
1966–67	Bristol St. George
1967–68	Bristol St. George
1968–69	Mangotsfield United
1969–70	Greenway Sports
1970–71	Greenway Sports
1971–72	Old Georgians
1972–73	Cadbury Heath
1973–74	Cadbury Heath
1974–75	Cadbury Heath
1975–76	Mangotsfield United
1976–77	Oldland
1977–78	Yate Town
1978–79	Hillfields O.B.
1979–80	P & W United
1980–81	Avon St. Phillips Ath.
1981–82	Henbury Athletic
1982–83	Henbury Athletic
1983–84	Henbury O.Bs.
1984–85	Eden Grove
1985–86	RWP
1986–87	Stokeside Sports
1987–88	Almondsbury Picksons
1988–89	St Philip's Marsh Adult School
1989–90	Bristol Manor Farm
1990–91	Glenside Hospital S.C.
1991–92	Yate Town

Season	Winners
1992–93	Yate Town
1993–94	Pucklechurch
1994–95	Bitton
1995–96	St. Aldhelms
1996–97	Winterbourne United
1997–98	Ridings High
1998–99	Bristol 5 O.B.
1999–2000	Bitton Reserves
2000–01	Bristol Union F.C.
2001–02	Nicholas Wanderers
2002–03	Hanham Athletic
2003–04	Shirehampton
2004–05	Glenside Five OB
2005–06	Glenside Five OB
2006–07	Bitton Reserves
2007–08	B & W Avonside
2008–09	Hallen Reserves
2009–10	Southmead Athletic
2010–11	Mendip United
2011–12	Highridge United
2012–13	Highridge United
2013–14	AEC Boko
2014–15	Totterdown United
2015–16	Bitton Reserves

=== Senior Amateur Challenge Cup (North) ===
Season	Winners
1925–26	Broadwell Amateurs
1926–27	Forest Green Rovers
1927–28	Sharpness
1928–29	Sharpness
1929–30	Cheltenham Town
1930–31	Cheltenham Town
1931–32	Gloucester City
1932–33	Cheltenham Town
1933–34	Cheltenham Town
1934–35	Cheltenham Town
1935–36	Stonehouse
1936–37	Chalford
1937–38	Charlton Kings
1938–39	Dursley
1939–40	Brimscombe
1940–45	No competition due to World War II
1945–46	Forest Green Rovers
1946–47	Charlton Kings
1947–48	Charlton Kings
1948–49	Charlton Kings
1949–50	Cinderford Town
1950–51	Stonehouse

Season	Winners
1951–52	Hoffman's Athletic
1952–53	Lydbrook
1953–54	Hoffman's Athletic
1954–55	Cinderford Town
1955–56	Cinderford Town
1956–57	Lydbrook Athletic
1957–58	Sharpness
1958–59	Lydbrook Athletic
1959–60	Lydbrook Athletic
1960–61	Lydbrook Athletic
1961–62	Sharpness
1962–63	Newent Town
1963–64	Gloucester City
1964–65	Bishop's Cleeve
1965–66	Sharpness
1966–67	Sharpness
1967–68	Brimscombe
1968–69	Bishop's Cleeve
1969–70	Cinderford Town
1970–71	Cinderford Town
1971–72	Forest Green Rovers
1972–73	Stonehouse

Season	Winners
1973–74	Moreton Town
1974–75	Matson Athletic
1975–76	Forest Green Rovers
1976–77	Cinderford Town
1977–78	Forest Green Rovers
1978–79	Hilldene Athletic
1979–80	Tewkesbury Y.M.C.A.
1980–81	Cirencester Town
1981–82	Badminton Picksons
1982–83	Wotton Rovers
1983–84	Viney St. Swithins
1984–85	Campden Town
1985–86	Shortwood United
1986–87	Bishop's Cleeve
1987–88	Tuffley Rovers
1988–89	Tewkesbury Y.M.C.A.
1989–90	Cirencester Town
1990–91	Tewkesbury Y.M.C.A.
1991–92	Cheltenham Saracens
1992–93	Endsleigh
1993–94	Shortwood United
1994–95	Brockworth

Season	Winners
1995–96	Endsleigh
1996–97	Endsleigh
1997–98	Cirencester Academy
1998–99	Whitminster
1999–2000	Shortwood United Res.
2000–01	Longlevens
2001–02	Taverners
2002–03	Kings Stanley
2003–04	Warden Hill
2004–05	Lydney Town
2005–06	Dursley Town
2006–07	Tuffley Rovers
2007–08	Sharpness
2008–09	Broadwell Amateurs
2009–10	Sharpness
2010–11	Harrow Hill
2011–12	Brockworth Albion
2012–13	Minsterworth
2013–14	Cheltenham Civil Service
2014–15
2015–16	Stonehouse Town

=== Lower tier County Cup (South) ===
Season	Junior (South) Winners	Intermediate (South) Winners	Minor (South) Winners	Primary (South) Winners
2000–01	Totterdown United	Langton Court Rangers	Brimsham Green Res.	Mendip Gate
2001–02	Longshore	Longwell Green Sports Res.	Alveston Rangers	Winterbourne United 'A'
2002–03	Lawrence Rovers	Sea Mills Park Res.	Soundwell Victoria	Ridings High 'A'
2003–04	TC Sports	Cadbury Heath 'A'	Shaftesbury Crusade Res.	Lawrence Rovers Res.
2004–05	Patchway Town Res.	Soundwell Victoria	AXA 'A'	Eden Grove
2005–06	Talbot Knowle	Southmead Athletic	Shirehampton 'A'	Bristol Sanctuary
2006–07	Lawrence Rovers	AFC Bohemia	Brislington Cricketers	Inter The Bloomfield
2007–08	Wessex Wanderers	Winterbourne United 'A'	Bristol Sanctuary XI	Broad Walk FC Res.
2008–09	Lawrence Rovers	Hanham Athletic 'A'	Broadwalk Reserves	Southmead CS (Saturday)
2009–10	Ashley	Eden Grove	St Georges Rangers	Real Thornbury
2010–11	Brislington Cricketers	Bradley Stoke Town	St Philip & Jacob (Pip n Jay)	Carmel
2011–12	Crosscourt United	Portville Warriors	Real Thornbury	Broadlands
2012–13	Stockwood Wanderers	Real Thornbury	Old Cliftonians	Sartan United (Saturday)
2013–14	Real Thornbury	Bristol Bilbao	Thornbury Baptist Church	Stapleton Reserves
2014–15	Talbot Knowle United	North Bristol United	Woodlands Rangers	Winford PH Reserves
2015–16	Stapleton	Hillfields Old Boys	Thornbury Baptist Church	De Veys Reserves

=== Lower tier County Cup (North) ===
Season	Junior (North) Winners	Intermediate (North) Winners	Minor (North) Winners	Primary (North) Winners
2000–01	Tetbury Town	Cam Bulldogs	Phoenix United	Hillesley Utd.
2001–02	Charfield	Taverners Res.	Down Ampney	Aylburton Res.
2002–03	Berkeley Town	Patriots	Aylburton	Marshall Langston
2003–04	Longlevens	G.A.L.A. Wilton	Adlestrop D & O	Ramblers Res.
2004–05	G.A.L.A. Wilton	Moreton Town	Woodmancote	Worral Hill
2005–06	Ramblers	Lydbrook Athletic	Stratton Wanderers	AC Olympia
2006–07	Barnwood Utd	AFC Bohemia	Tewkesbury Dynamos	Newnham Utd
2007–08	FC Barometrics	Kingswood Res.	Tewkesbury Rovers	Didmarton
2008–09	Frampton United	Bibury	Charlton Rovers Res.	C & G
2009–10	Marshall Langston	FC Barometrics	C & G	Bush
2010–11	Minsterworth	Whitecroft	Whaddon Utd	F C Lakeside
2011–12	Bibury	Huntley	Upton St Leonards Reserves	Vinney St Swithins Reserves
2012–13	Avonvale United	FC Lakeside	Tuffley Rovers 'A'	The Village
2013–14	Southside	Charfield	Alkerton Rangers	Levkhampton Rovers Reserves
2014–15	Longlevens	Ellwood Reserves	Northway	Fintan Reserves
2015–16	Stroud Harriers	Chalford Reserves	Mushet & Coalway	South Cerney Reserves

=== Women's competitions ===
Season	GFA Women's Trophy		GFA Women's Challenge Cup	
Season	Winners	Runners-up	Winners	Runners-up
2018–19	Cheltenham Town	Frampton Rangers	Cirencester Town	Cheltenham Town Under-18s
2017-18	St Nicholas	Cheltenham Town	Cotswold Rangers	Mitcheldean
2016-17	Cheltenham Town	St Nicholas Reserves	Frampton Rangers	Stoke Lane Athletic
2015-16	Forest Green Rovers	Cheltenham Town	Abbeymead Rovers	Mangotsfield United
2014-15	Forest Green Rovers	Bristol Ladies Union	Bristol Ladies Union Development	Abbeymead Rovers
2013-14	Forest Green Rovers	Bristol Ladies Union	St Nicholas	Cheltenham Town Development
2012-13	Bristol Academy	Downend Flyers		
2011-12	Stroud & South Gloucestershire College Filton	Gloucester City		
2010-11	Stroud & South Gloucestershire College Filton	Downend Flyers		
2009-10	Stroud & South Gloucestershire College Filton	Forest Green Rovers		
2008-09	Forest Green Rovers	Cheltenham Town		
2007-08	Filton College Academy	Forest Green Rovers		

== Directors & Officials ==
=== Board of directors ===
- Roy Schafer (chairman)
- Graham Papworth (Finance Director)
- David Neale (Chief Executive)
- Sue Henson-Green
- Nigel Newport-Black
- Mohamed Patel
- Clive Rawlings
- Suzette Davenport
- Errol Thompson

=== Key Officials ===
- David Neale (Chief Executive)
- Matthew Boucher (Football Development Manager)
- Chris Lucker (Football Services Manager)
- Roger Vaughan (Referee Development and Equality Officer)
