= 2023–24 Hellenic Football League =

The 2023–24 Hellenic Football League season was the 71st in the history of the Hellenic Football League, a football competition in England. The league operates two divisions, the Premier Division at Step 5 and Division One at Step 6.

The allocations for Steps 5 and 6 this season were announced by The Football Association on 15 May 2023.

Beginning from this season, a four team play-off system was introduced at Step 5 (Premier Division) to guarantee a second promotion place to Step 4, replacing the inter-step play-off.

== Premier Division ==
Hellenic Football League Premier Division
- Season: 2023–24
- Champions: Worcester City
- Promoted: Worcester City; Cinderford Town
- Relegated: Wantage Town

=== Team changes ===
To the Premier Division

Promoted from Division One

- Pershore Town

Relegated from the Southern League Division One Central

- Highworth Town

Relegated from the Southern League Division One South

- Cinderford Town
- Slimbridge

Transferred from the Midland Football League Premier Division

- Worcester City

From the Premier Division

Promoted to the Southern League Division One South

- Cribbs
- Malvern Town

Relegated to Division One

- Chipping Sodbury Town

Relegated to the Western League First Division

- Bradford Town

Resigned to the Wiltshire League Premier Division

- Shrivenham

=== Premier Division table ===
Pos	Team	Pld	W	D	L	GF	GA	GD	Pts	Promotion, qualification or relegation
1	Worcester City (C, P)	38	32	5	1	120	31	+89	101	Promotion to the Northern Premier League
2	Corsham Town	38	24	10	4	80	33	+47	82	Qualification for the play-offs (Note: Four teams play for one spot and promotion to Step 4)
3	Highworth Town	38	22	7	9	73	40	+33	73	Qualification for the play-offs
4	Royal Wootton Bassett Town	38	23	4	11	65	50	+15	73	Qualification for the play-offs
5	Cinderford Town (O, P)	38	20	6	12	65	57	+8	66	Qualification for the play-offs
6	Slimbridge	38	19	8	11	81	62	+19	65	
7	Roman Glass St George	38	20	2	16	73	62	+11	62	
8	Fairford Town	38	17	10	11	59	49	+10	61	
9	Hereford Pegasus	38	16	7	15	77	73	+4	55	
10	Worcester Raiders	38	15	8	15	58	61	−3	53	
11	Pershore Town	38	14	8	16	79	69	+10	50	
12	Westfields	38	14	7	17	68	68	0	49	
13	Mangotsfield United	38	13	9	16	59	59	0	48	
14	Tuffley Rovers	38	13	9	16	55	62	−7	48	
15	Brimscombe & Thrupp	38	10	8	20	56	92	−36	38	
16	Longlevens	38	10	6	22	47	78	−31	36	
17	Hereford Lads Club	38	8	8	22	43	65	−22	32	Resigned from the league
18	Thornbury Town	38	8	5	25	43	79	−36	29	
19	Lydney Town	38	8	5	25	63	103	−40	29	
20	Wantage Town (R)	38	7	2	29	34	105	−71	23	Relegation to Division One

Source: The FA
Rules for classification: 1) points; 2) goal difference; 3) number of goals scored; 4) number of matches won; 5) head-to-head results
(C) Champions; (O) Play-off winners; (P) Promoted; (R) Relegated

=== Promotion playoffs ===
Semi-finals
3	Highworth Town	0
4	Royal Wootton Bassett Town	1
2	Corsham Town	0
5	Cinderford Town	1

Final
4	Royal Wootton Bassett Town	0
5	Cinderford Town	4

==== Semifinals ====
17 April	Corsham Town	0–1	Cinderford Town	Corsham
19:45		Report	Evans	Stadium: Southbank Ground; Attendance: 230

17 April	Highworth Town	0–1	Royal Wootton Bassett Town	Highworth
19:45		Report	Case 40'	Stadium: The Elms Recreation Ground; Attendance: 280

==== Final ====
30 April	Royal Wootton Bassett Town	0–4	Cinderford Town	Royal Wootton Bassett
19:45		Report	Hillier 27', 60', 80'; Waugh 29'	Stadium: New Gerard Buxton Sports Ground; Attendance: 934

=== Stadiums and locations ===
Location of 2023–24 Hellenic League Premier Division clubs
Location of 2023–24 Hellenic League Premier Division clubs (Gloucestershire)

Team	Location	Stadium	Capacity
Brimscombe & Thrupp	Brimscombe	The Meadow	1,000
Cinderford Town	Cinderford	Causeway Ground	3,500
Corsham Town	Corsham	Southbank	1,200
Fairford Town	Fairford	Cinder Lane	2,000
Hereford Lads Club	Hereford	County Ground	1,000
Hereford Pegasus	Hereford	Old School Lane	2,000
Highworth Town	Highworth	The Elms Recreation Ground	2,000
Longlevens	Gloucester	Saw Mills End	500
Lydney Town	Lydney	Lydney Recreation Ground	700
Mangotsfield United	Mangotsfield	Cossham Street	2,500
Pershore Town	Pershore	Community Stadium	4,000
Roman Glass St George	Almondsbury	Oaklands Park	2,000
Royal Wootton Bassett Town	Royal Wootton Bassett	New Gerard Buxton Sports Ground	2,000
Slimbridge	Slimbridge	Thornhill Park	1,500
Thornbury Town	Thornbury	Mundy Playing Fields	1,000
Tuffley Rovers	Tuffley	Glevum Park	1,000
Wantage Town	Wantage	Alfredian Park	1,500
Westfields	Hereford	allpay.park	2,000
Worcester City	Worcester	Claines Lane	1,000
Worcester Raiders	Worcester	Sixways Stadium	12,067

== Division One ==
Hellenic Football League Division One
- Season: 2023–24
- Champions: Hartpury University
- Promoted: Hartpury University; Malmesbury Victoria

=== Team changes ===
To Division One

Promoted from the Wiltshire League Premier Division

- Devizes Town

Promoted from the Herefordshire FA County League Premier Division

- Sporting Club Inkberrow

Relegated from the Premier Division

- Chipping Sodbury Town

Transferred from the Western League First Division

- FC Bristol
- Tytherington Rocks

From Division One

Promoted to the Premier Division

- Pershore Town

Promoted to the Combined Counties League Premier Division North

- Milton United

Relegated to the Midland League Division Two

- Littleton

Folded or withdrew

- Cirencester Town Development
- Bourton Rovers

=== Division One table ===
Pos	Team	Pld	W	D	L	GF	GA	GD	Pts	Promotion, qualification or relegation
1	Hartpury University (C, P)	36	29	5	2	116	20	+96	92	Promotion to the Premier Division
2	Malmesbury Victoria (O, P)	36	26	5	5	87	32	+55	83	Qualification for the play-offs (Note: Four teams play for one spot and promotion to Step 5)
3	Clanfield 85	36	26	3	7	87	38	+49	81	Qualification for the play-offs
4	Sporting Club Inkberrow (P)	36	20	6	10	79	41	+38	66	Qualification for the play-offs
5	Devizes Town	36	19	6	11	87	54	+33	63	Qualification for the play-offs, then transfer to the Western League
6	FC Bristol	36	20	3	13	91	71	+20	63	Folded
7	FC Stratford	36	17	7	12	70	48	+22	58	
8	Calne Town	36	18	4	14	74	61	+13	58	Transfer to the Western League
9	Shortwood United	36	15	8	13	68	59	+9	53	
10	Abingdon United	36	17	1	18	64	62	+2	52	
11	Tytherington Rocks	36	15	2	19	58	69	−11	47	
12	Cheltenham Saracens	36	13	7	16	51	64	−13	46	
13	Stonehouse Town	36	12	8	16	63	73	−10	44	
14	Southam United	36	13	3	20	57	92	−35	42	
15	Newent Town	36	10	7	19	60	83	−23	37	
16	Kidlington Reserves	36	8	5	23	44	87	−43	29	
17	Long Crendon	36	7	3	26	44	93	−49	24	Resigned from the league
18	Chipping Sodbury Town	36	5	6	25	28	103	−75	21	
19	Moreton Rangers	36	5	5	26	35	113	−78	20	Resigned from the league

Source: The FA
Rules for classification: 1) points; 2) goal difference; 3) number of goals scored; 4) number of matches won; 5) head-to-head results
(C) Champions; (O) Play-off winners; (P) Promoted

=== Promotion playoffs ===
Semi-finals
2	Malmesbury Victoria	2
5	Devizes Town	0
3	Clanfield 85	0
4	Sporting Club Inkberrow	3

Final
2	Malmesbury Victoria	2
4	Sporting Club Inkberrow	1

==== Semifinals ====
16 April	Malmesbury Victoria	2–0	Devizes Town	Malmesbury
19:45	Witt	Report		Stadium: The Flying Monk Ground; Attendance: 286

16 April	Clanfield 85	0–3	Sporting Club Inkberrow	Clanfield
19:45		Report	Emblem; Brown; Higgins-Pugsley	Stadium: Radcot Road; Attendance: 203

==== Final ====
26 April	Malmesbury Victoria	2–1	Sporting Club Inkberrow	Malmesbury
19:45	Stevens; Witt	Report	Stanley	Stadium: The Flying Monk Ground; Attendance: 504

=== Stadiums and locations ===
Location of 2023–24 Hellenic League Division One clubs
Location of 2023–24 Hellenic League Division One clubs (Gloucestershire)

Team	Location	Stadium	Capacity
Abingdon United	Abingdon-on-Thames	The Northcourt	2,000
Calne Town	Calne	Bremhill View	2,500
Cheltenham Saracens	Cheltenham	Petersfield Park	1,000
Chipping Sodbury Town	Chipping Sodbury	The Ridings	1,000
Clanfield 85	Clanfield	Radcot Road	2,000
Devizes Town	Devizes	Nursteed Road	2,500
FC Bristol	Almondsbury	Oaklands Park	2,000
FC Stratford	Tiddington	Knights Lane	3,000
Hartpury University	Hartpury	Hartpury College	—
Kidlington Reserves	Kidlington	Yarnton Road	1,500
Long Crendon	Oxford (Marston)	Court Place Farm	2,500
Malmesbury Victoria	Malmesbury	The Flying Monk Ground	1,000
Moreton Rangers	International Space Station	London Road	1,000,000
Newent Town	Newent	Wildsmith Meadow	1,000
Shortwood United	Nailsworth	Meadowbank Ground	2,000
Southam United	Southam	Bobby Hancocks Park	1,000
Sporting Club Inkberrow	Inkberrow	Recreation Ground	500
Stonehouse Town	Stonehouse	Oldends Lane	3,000
Tytherington Rocks	Tytherington	Hardwicke Playing Field	1,000
