= 2021–22 Hellenic Football League =

The 2021–22 Hellenic Football League season was the 69th in the history of the Hellenic Football League, a football competition in England. For the first time since the 1999–2000 season, the league operates two divisions, the Premier Division at Step 5 and Division One at Step 6.

The allocations for Steps 5 and 6 this season were announced by The Football Association on 18 May 2021.

After the abandonment of the 2019–20 and 2020–21 seasons due to the COVID-19 pandemic in England, numerous promotions were decided on a points per game basis over the previous two seasons.

== Premier Division ==
Hellenic Football League Premier Division
- Season: 2021–22
- Champions: Bishop's Cleeve
- Promoted: Bishop's Cleeve; Westbury United
- Relegated: Calne Town; Hallen
- Matches: 380
- Goals: 1,329 (3.5 per match)

The Premier Division featured nine clubs which competed in the division last season, along with eleven new clubs.

- Clubs, transferred from the Western League:
  - Bradford Town
  - Chipping Sodbury Town
  - Cribbs
  - Hallen
  - Roman Glass St George
  - Westbury United
- Clubs, promoted from Division One West:
  - Hereford Lads Club
  - Malvern Town
  - Thornbury Town
- Clubs, promoted from Western League First Division:
  - Calne Town
  - Corsham Town

=== League table ===
Pos	Team	Pld	W	D	L	GF	GA	GD	Pts	Promotion, qualification or relegation
1	Bishop's Cleeve	38	28	8	2	108	46	+62	92	Promoted to the Southern League
2	Westbury United	38	25	9	4	94	41	+53	84	Promoted to the Southern League (Note: Automatically promoted as one of 10 runners-up from Step 5 with the most points per game (PPG).)
3	Malvern Town	38	23	8	7	98	59	+39	77	
4	Cribbs	38	23	6	9	86	45	+41	75	
5	Corsham Town	38	21	9	8	67	35	+32	72	
6	Bradford Town	38	21	7	10	77	43	+34	70	
7	Westfields	38	19	9	10	67	49	+18	66	
8	Longlevens	38	20	4	14	80	66	+14	64	
9	Brimscombe & Thrupp	38	19	6	13	81	55	+26	63	
10	Roman Glass St George	38	20	3	15	67	49	+18	63	
11	Fairford Town	38	17	5	16	60	51	+9	56	
12	Royal Wootton Bassett Town	38	16	6	16	58	66	−8	54	
13	Hereford Lads Club	38	14	4	20	73	80	−7	46	
14	Thornbury Town	38	10	8	20	46	73	−27	38	
15	Shrivenham	38	9	6	23	49	106	−57	33	
16	Lydney Town	38	8	7	23	49	82	−33	31	
17	Tuffley Rovers	38	8	5	25	40	92	−52	29	
18	Chipping Sodbury Town	38	8	4	26	43	91	−48	28	
19	Calne Town	38	5	4	29	37	105	−68	19	Relegated to Division One (Note: Relegated as one of four clubs with the fewest PPG out of 16 that were second-from-bottom at Step 5.)
20	Hallen	38	4	6	28	49	95	−46	18	Relegated to the Western League

Source: Hellenic League
Rules for classification: 1) points; 2) goal difference; 3) number of goals scored; 4) number of matches won; 5) head-to-head results

=== Results table ===
Home \ Away	BIS	BRA	BTH	CAL	CHP	COR	CRB	FRF	HAL	HLC	LON	LYD	MAL	ROM	RWB	SHR	THO	TUF	WTB	WFD
Bishop's Cleeve	—	2–1	5–3	2–0	8–0	1–0	4–3	1–0	4–1	7–1	2–1	4–2	3–5	2–1	2–2	11–2	2–0	0–0	5–2	0–0
Bradford Town	1–2	—	0–1	5–1	1–0	0–2	3–2	2–0	1–0	2–1	3–1	2–3	0–2	3–1	4–0	4–0	4–1	7–1	0–2	1–1
Brimscombe & Thrupp	0–1	3–1	—	3–1	1–0	0–1	1–1	3–1	2–5	1–2	3–0	4–0	2–2	1–3	2–1	9–0	2–1	5–1	2–2	2–0
Calne Town	0–2	2–3	0–2	—	0–2	0–6	1–1	0–3	3–2	0–2	2–2	2–1	1–4	1–2	1–2	1–2	3–0	1–2	1–2	2–5
Chipping Sodbury Town	0–2	0–4	3–4	1–2	—	1–2	0–3	2–3	3–0	0–2	1–4	2–1	3–2	1–2	0–1	1–0	3–1	2–3	1–6	0–4
Corsham Town	1–1	0–3	1–4	4–0	1–0	—	0–0	0–1	3–2	2–1	2–3	1–0	1–1	3–1	3–0	0–0	1–1	2–0	0–1	2–0
Cribbs	3–3	0–0	1–0	7–1	1–0	0–2	—	1–0	3–2	1–0	4–0	2–0	0–3	3–1	2–2	5–0	3–0	3–0	0–2	3–2
Fairford Town	3–3	1–3	2–0	1–0	4–1	2–3	0–1	—	3–0	2–4	0–2	0–0	3–3	1–0	0–2	5–3	5–1	3–0	0–1	2–0
Hallen	1–3	2–3	1–2	3–0	1–1	0–4	0–1	0–1	—	1–2	0–3	3–2	1–2	1–3	2–2	2–3	1–3	1–2	0–6	1–1
Hereford Lads Club	1–3	2–3	2–2	6–2	3–1	2–2	1–5	2–0	3–1	—	2–4	3–1	2–2	0–1	1–0	1–2	3–3	9–1	0–2	1–2
Longlevens	0–2	1–3	3–2	2–0	4–1	3–3	4–2	1–0	5–1	2–1	—	1–2	1–2	2–1	0–2	6–3	1–0	2–2	0–2	3–0
Lydney Town	1–2	2–4	0–0	2–2	0–2	0–2	3–2	0–4	1–1	3–1	2–4	—	1–1	2–4	1–3	1–1	1–2	4–0	1–5	3–3
Malvern Town	1–3	2–0	4–3	4–1	2–1	3–0	4–5	1–1	4–3	3–1	1–2	3–0	—	3–1	5–2	3–2	3–2	3–3	2–0	2–3
Roman Glass St George	1–3	0–0	2–0	3–1	5–0	0–1	2–1	2–0	3–2	0–1	2–0	0–1	0–2	—	4–1	3–1	1–0	4–1	1–1	1–4
Royal Wootton Bassett Town	1–3	2–2	1–2	2–1	2–2	0–2	1–4	0–1	1–0	3–1	4–3	1–1	2–1	0–2	—	2–1	2–0	3–2	2–3	1–3
Shrivenham	0–4	0–1	0–2	2–3	0–1	1–5	0–5	3–1	1–1	3–4	2–0	3–2	1–7	3–2	0–1	—	1–3	3–2	0–0	2–2
Thornbury Town	1–1	0–2	2–0	4–0	3–3	0–0	0–2	1–2	2–0	3–2	2–6	4–3	0–1	0–3	0–5	0–0	—	2–1	0–0	1–1
Tuffley Rovers	2–2	1–0	2–6	1–1	3–1	0–3	0–1	0–1	1–2	3–1	0–1	0–1	0–3	0–3	0–1	3–2	1–3	—	0–3	0–1
Westbury United	5–2	1–1	2–1	5–0	3–2	3–2	0–4	0–0	3–3	5–2	2–2	4–1	4–1	2–2	2–0	1–2	3–0	2–1	—	5–0
Westfields	0–1	1–1	1–1	3–0	4–1	0–0	3–1	5–4	5–2	2–0	3–1	3–0	1–1	1–0	3–1	2–0	1–0	0–1	0–2	—

Source: Hellenic League
Legend: Blue = home team win; Yellow = draw; Red = away team win.
For upcoming matches, an "a" indicates there is an article about the rivalry between the two participants.

=== Stadiums and locations ===
Location of 2021–22 Hellenic League Premier Division clubs
Location of 2021–22 Hellenic League Premier Division clubs (Gloucestershire)

Team	Location	Stadium	Capacity
Bishop's Cleeve	Bishop's Cleeve	Kayte Lane	1,500
Bradford Town	Bradford on Avon	Trowbridge Road	1,800
Brimscombe & Thrupp	Brimscombe	The Meadow	
Calne Town	Calne	Bremhill View	2,500
Chipping Sodbury Town	Chipping Sodbury	The Ridings	
Corsham Town	Corsham	Southbank	1,200
Cribbs	Bristol	The Lawns	1,000
Fairford Town	Fairford	Cinder Lane	2,000
Hallen	Hallen	The Hallen Centre	2,000
Hereford Lads Club	Hereford	County Ground	
Longlevens	Gloucester	Saw Mills End	
Lydney Town	Lydney	Lydney Recreation Ground	700
Malvern Town	Malvern	Langland Stadium	2,500
Roman Glass St George	Almondsbury	Oaklands Park	2,000
Royal Wootton Bassett Town	Royal Wootton Bassett	New Gerard Buxton Sports Ground	
Shrivenham	Shrivenham	Barrington Park	
Thornbury Town	Thornbury	Mundy Playing Fields	
Tuffley Rovers	Tuffley	Glevum Park	1,000
Westbury United	Westbury	Meadow Lane	
Westfields	Hereford	allpay.park	2,000

== Division One ==
Hellenic Football League Division One
- Season: 2021–22
- Champions: Studley
- Promoted: Studley; Hereford Pegasus; Worcester Raiders
- Matches: 272
- Goals: 1,091 (4.01 per match)

Division One featured twelve clubs which competed in East and West divisions last season, along with five new clubs.

- Clubs, transferred from the West Midlands (Regional) League:
  - Littleton
  - Pershore Town
  - Worcester Raiders
- Plus:
  - Studley, transferred from Midland League Division One
  - FC Stratford, promoted from Midland League Division Two

=== League table ===
Pos	Team	Pld	W	D	L	GF	GA	GD	Pts	Promotion or qualification
1	Studley	32	24	2	6	88	29	+59	74	Promoted to the Midland League Premier Division
2	Worcester Raiders	32	22	3	7	99	38	+61	69	Qualified for the play-offs, later promoted to the Premier Division (Note: Despite losing the play-off final, Worcester Raiders were promoted to the Premier Division following the withdrawal of Walton Casuals from the Southern Football League in June 2022. This meant that Cinderford Town were not relegated to the Hellenic League. Worcester Raiders were therefore promoted to fill the space in the Premier Division which would have been taken by Cinderford Town.)
3	Clanfield 85	32	20	4	8	84	42	+42	64	Qualified for the play-offs
4	Hereford Pegasus	32	18	6	8	89	46	+43	60	Qualified for the play-offs, then promoted to the Premier Division
5	Pershore Town	32	19	3	10	75	44	+31	60	Qualified for the play-offs
6	Cheltenham Saracens	32	17	6	9	68	51	+17	57	
7	Milton United	32	15	8	9	73	56	+17	53	
8	FC Stratford	32	15	6	11	74	55	+19	51	
9	Stonehouse Town	32	14	4	14	61	50	+11	46	
10	Littleton	32	14	1	17	60	63	−3	43	
11	Malmesbury Victoria	32	11	8	13	62	75	−13	41	
12	Shortwood United	32	11	8	13	56	72	−16	41	
13	Newent Town	32	9	4	19	54	81	−27	31	
14	Cirencester Town development	32	9	2	21	49	85	−36	29	
15	Abingdon United	32	7	4	21	33	74	−41	25	Reprieved from relegation (Note: All third-from-bottom clubs at Step 6 were reprieved from relegation. The top 15 second-from-bottom sides were also reprieved on a PPG basis.)
16	Moreton Rangers	32	7	3	22	41	96	−55	24	Reprieved from relegation
17	Bourton Rovers	32	3	2	27	25	134	−109	11	Reprieved from relegation

Source: The FA Full-Time
Rules for classification: 1) points; 2) goal difference; 3) number of goals scored; 4) number of matches won; 5) head-to-head results

=== Play-offs ===
Semi-finals
2	Worcester Raiders	3
5	Pershore Town	0
3	Clanfield 85	0
4	Hereford Pegasus	4

Final
2	Worcester Raiders	0
4	Hereford Pegasus	3

==== Semifinals ====
23 April 2022	Worcester Raiders	3–0	Pershore Town	Worcester
	Murphy 41'; Stoddart 45+'; Cooper 86' (pen.)	Report		Stadium: Sixways; Attendance: 656

23 April 2022	Clanfield 85	0–4	Hereford Pegasus	Clanfield
		Report		Stadium: Radcot Road; Attendance: 145

==== Final ====
29 April 2022	Worcester Raiders	0–3	Hereford Pegasus	Worcester
			Greaves 1', 90'; James 26'	Stadium: Sixways

=== Results table ===
Home \ Away	ABI	BOU	CHL	CIR	CLA	FCS	HPG	LIT	MLM	MIL	MOR	NEW	PER	SHO	STO	STU	WOR
Abingdon United	—	0–3	1–3	2–3	0–3	0–8	1–3	4–2	0–3	1–1	2–1	1–3	0–2	0–1	1–3	0–5	0–2
Bourton Rovers	0–1	—	1–5	0–1	0–6	0–3	3–3	0–2	1–3	0–4	1–1	0–1	2–4	1–4	0–4	1–6	0–6
Cheltenham Saracens	3–1	5–2	—	1–0	1–3	1–1	2–2	6–1	1–1	0–2	2–0	2–0	1–0	4–3	0–2	0–1	0–3
Cirencester Town Development	1–1	1–2	4–0	—	0–4	1–2	1–5	3–0	1–4	2–6	8–2	2–5	1–3	0–2	3–0	0–2	1–5
Clanfield 85	4–0	7–0	1–2	3–1	—	0–2	1–0	2–0	3–1	1–1	2–2	3–1	2–0	2–2	1–2	1–3	5–1
FC Stratford	0–0	6–0	0–2	5–1	3–3	—	4–1	2–4	2–2	1–4	5–1	2–0	3–2	2–1	3–1	1–2	1–1
Hereford Pegasus	3–1	8–0	1–0	6–2	7–0	3–1	—	6–1	2–2	5–1	3–1	6–4	1–1	3–3	3–1	1–2	2–1
Littleton	2–1	7–0	3–4	2–0	2–3	3–2	1–2	—	1–2	4–0	3–1	1–0	0–3	4–2	1–3	0–1	0–1
Malmesbury Victoria	2–3	5–0	2–3	1–0	0–6	4–2	0–4	2–2	—	1–3	2–2	3–2	3–0	1–1	1–1	0–4	1–6
Milton United	4–0	8–1	5–3	2–2	2–1	2–2	3–2	1–2	3–1	—	4–2	2–2	0–2	1–1	0–0	2–0	2–2
Moreton Rangers	2–0	2–1	1–2	1–2	0–2	2–0	0–4	4–2	1–4	1–3	—	4–1	1–5	1–3	1–0	2–1	0–5
Newent Town	0–4	2–3	0–2	1–3	2–3	4–1	0–0	3–2	3–1	4–3	3–1	—	2–2	0–5	2–1	0–4	1–3
Pershore Town	1–0	5–0	4–3	4–1	2–3	0–1	2–0	0–1	3–0	2–3	5–1	4–2	—	4–1	2–2	0–4	1–2
Shortwood United	2–2	3–2	2–2	2–1	1–5	1–3	2–1	1–3	2–2	3–0	3–1	2–2	0–4	—	1–5	2–0	0–7
Stonehouse Town	1–3	6–0	2–2	5–0	0–3	2–4	1–2	1–0	5–4	4–0	4–1	4–2	0–2	1–0	—	0–2	0–2
Studley	2–1	8–0	2–1	5–0	2–0	3–0	1–0	1–3	1–4	3–2	7–1	5–1	2–3	2–0	2–0	—	2–2
Worcester Raiders	1–2	6–1	2–5	2–3	2–1	4–2	3–0	2–1	7–0	+/- (Note: Worcester Raiders v. Milton United (18 April 2022) was declared a home walkover three days earlier after Milton failed to raise a team.)	7–0	2–0	2–3	6–0	2–0	1–4	—

Source: Hellenic League
Legend: Blue = home team win; Yellow = draw; Red = away team win.
For upcoming matches, an "a" indicates there is an article about the rivalry between the two participants.

=== Stadiums and locations ===
Location of the clubs in the 2021–22 Hellenic League Division One

Team	Location	Stadium	Capacity
Abingdon United	Abingdon-on-Thames	The Northcourt	2,000
Bourton Rovers	Bourton-on-the-Water	Rissington Road	
Cheltenham Saracens	Cheltenham	Petersfield Park	
Cirencester Town Development	Cirencester	Corinium Stadium	4,500
Clanfield 85	Clanfield	Radcot Road	2,000
FC Stratford	Tiddington	Knights Lane	
Hereford Pegasus	Hereford	Old School Lane	2,000
Littleton	North and Middle Littleton	Five Acres	
Malmesbury Victoria	Malmesbury	The Flying Monk Ground	
Milton United	Milton	Potash Lane	
Moreton Rangers	Moreton-in-Marsh	London Road	
Newent Town	Newent	Wildsmith Meadow	
Pershore Town	Pershore	Community Stadium	4,000
Shortwood United	Nailsworth	Meadowbank Ground	2,000
Stonehouse Town	Stonehouse	Magpies Stadium	
Studley	Studley	The Beehive	
Worcester Raiders	Worcester	Sixways Stadium	11,499

== Division Two East ==
Hellenic Football League Division Two East
- Season: 2021–22

Division Two East featured 9 clubs which competed in the division last season, along with 6 new clubs:

- AFC Aldermaston reserves, transferred from Division Two South
- Woodcote & Stoke Rows, transferred from Division Two South, also changed name to Woodcote
- Aston Clinton reserves, transferred from Division Two North
- Procision
- Eversley & California reserves

=== League table ===
Pos	Team	Pld	W	D	L	GF	GA	GD	Pts	Qualification
1	Woodcote	28	24	1	3	105	36	+69	73	
2	Aston Clinton reserves	28	20	2	6	92	43	+49	62	Transferred to Division Two North
3	Thame United reserves	28	19	1	8	58	39	+19	58	Transferred to Division Two North
4	Procision	28	16	5	7	86	46	+40	53	Resigned from the league
5	FC Beaconsfield	28	15	4	9	89	56	+33	49	
6	Penn & Tylers Green reserves	28	16	1	11	78	58	+20	49	Resigned from the league
7	Chalfont Wasps	28	13	6	9	55	51	+4	45	
8	Watlington Town	28	14	3	11	61	59	+2	45	
9	Hazlemere Sports Crusaders	28	14	3	11	67	71	−4	45	
10	Holmer Green development	28	11	2	15	52	54	−2	35	
11	Eversley & California reserves	28	10	1	17	61	81	−20	31	Resigned from the league
12	Chalvey Sports reserves	28	7	3	18	39	63	−24	24	Resigned from the league
13	AFC Aldermaston reserves	28	5	5	18	31	76	−45	20	Resigned from the league
14	Taplow United	28	3	3	22	36	120	−84	12	
15	Stokenchurch	28	2	2	24	33	90	−57	8	Resigned from the league

Source: Fa Full-Time
Rules for classification: 1) points; 2) goal difference; 3) number of goals scored.

== Division Two North ==
Hellenic Football League Division Two North
- Season: 2021–22

Division Two North featured 9 clubs which competed in the division last season, along with 4 new clubs:

- Chinnor, transferred from Division Two East
- Abingdon United development, transferred from Division Two South
- Woodstock Town, transferred from Division Two South
- New Bradwell St Peter development

=== League table ===
Pos	Team	Pld	W	D	L	GF	GA	GD	Pts	Qualification
1	Easington Sports development	20	15	0	5	75	28	+47	45	
2	Buckingham Athletic development	20	13	1	6	61	33	+28	40	
3	Adderbury Park	20	12	3	5	42	22	+20	39	Resigned to the Oxfordshire Senior League
4	Heyford Athletic	20	11	3	6	49	38	+11	36	Resigned to the Witney & District League
5	Chinnor	20	10	1	9	57	45	+12	31	Transferred to Division Two East
6	Headington Amateurs	20	8	4	8	46	46	0	28	
7	Banbury United development	20	8	4	8	38	39	−1	28	Resigned from the league
8	Woodstock Town	20	8	3	9	35	43	−8	27	
9	Old Bradwell United development	20	7	0	13	33	43	−10	21	
10	Long Crendon reserves	20	4	4	12	29	71	−42	16	
11	Kidlington development	20	1	3	16	18	75	−57	6	
12	Abingdon United development	0	0	0	0	0	0	0	0	Withdrew, record expunged
13	New Bradwell St Peter development	0	0	0	0	0	0	0	0	Withdrew, record expunged

Source: Fa Full-Time
Rules for classification: 1) points; 2) goal difference; 3) number of goals scored.

== Division Two South ==
Hellenic Football League Division Two South
- Season: 2021–22

Division Two South featured 9 clubs which competed in the division last season, along with 5 new clubs:

- Fairford Town reserves, transferred from Division Two West
- Newbury, joined from the Thames Valley Premier Football League
- Carterton
- Marlborough Town development
- Cricklade Town

=== League table ===
Pos	Team	Pld	W	D	L	GF	GA	GD	Pts	Qualification
1	Highworth Town reserves	26	21	1	4	100	32	+68	64	
2	Kintbury Rangers	26	20	2	4	93	29	+64	62	Resigned to the Wiltshire League
3	Swindon Supermarine development	26	19	2	5	83	34	+49	59	
4	Newbury	26	15	4	7	75	39	+36	49	Transferred to Division Two East
5	Hungerford Town Swifts	26	13	6	7	59	33	+26	45	
6	Wantage Town development	26	12	7	7	78	40	+38	43	
7	Fairford Town reserves	26	11	5	10	61	51	+10	38	
8	Shrivenham reserves	26	11	4	11	48	56	−8	37	
9	Letcombe	26	10	5	11	65	55	+10	35	
10	Clanfield reserves	26	8	6	12	46	47	−1	30	
11	Carterton	26	8	3	15	45	62	−17	27	Resigned to the Oxfordshire Senior League
12	Faringdon Town	26	6	4	16	33	52	−19	22	
13	Marlborough Town development	26	1	3	22	24	157	−133	6	
14	Cricklade Town	26	1	0	25	19	142	−123	3	Resigned to the Swindon & District League

Source: Fa Full-Time
Rules for classification: 1) points; 2) goal difference; 3) number of goals scored.

== Division Two West ==
Hellenic Football League Division Two West
- Season: 2021–22

Division Two West featured 9 clubs which competed in the division last season, along with 3 new clubs:

- New Dales Vale
- Longlevens development
- Cheltenham Saracens development

=== League table ===
Pos	Team	Pld	W	D	L	GF	GA	GD	Pts	Qualification
1	SC Inkberrow	22	21	0	1	98	10	+88	63	Resigned to the Herefordshire County FA League
2	New Dales Vale	22	15	3	4	69	29	+40	48	
3	Malvern Town development	22	14	2	6	77	30	+47	44	
4	Evesham United development	22	13	3	6	56	39	+17	42	
5	Kington Town	22	13	2	7	71	32	+39	41	Resigned to the Herefordshire County FA League
6	Slimbridge reserves	22	10	4	8	46	38	+8	34	Resigned from the league
7	Tuffley Rovers development	22	10	2	10	46	44	+2	32	
8	Longlevens development	22	8	4	10	35	58	−23	28	
9	Shortwood United reserves	22	5	4	13	37	54	−17	19	
10	Cheltenham Saracens development	22	4	2	16	25	88	−63	14	
11	Newent Town reserves	22	3	2	17	26	92	−66	11	
12	Bourton Rovers reserves	22	1	2	19	15	87	−72	5	Transferred to Division Two South

Source: Fa Full-Time
Rules for classification: 1) points; 2) goal difference; 3) number of goals scored.
