= 2022–23 Hellenic Football League =

The 2022–23 Hellenic Football League season was the 70th in the history of the Hellenic Football League, a football competition in England. The league operates two divisions, the Premier Division at Step 5 and Division One at Step 6.

The allocations for Steps 5 and 6 this season were announced by The Football Association on 12 May 2022.

== Premier Division ==
Hellenic Football League Premier Division
- Season: 2022–23
- Dates: 2 August 2022 – 29 April 2023
- Champions: Cribbs
- Promoted: Cribbs; Malvern Town
- Relegated: Bradford Town; Chipping Sodbury Town
- Matches: 380
- Goals: 1,314 (3.46 per match)

=== Team changes ===
To the Premier Division

Promoted from Division One

- Hereford Pegasus
- Worcester Raiders

Relegated from the Southern League Division One Central

- Wantage Town

Relegated from the Southern League Division One South

- Mangotsfield United

From the Premier Division

Promoted to the Southern League Premier Division South

- Bishop's Cleeve
- Westbury United

Relegated to Division One

- Calne Town

Relegated to the Western League Division One

- Hallen

=== Premier Division table ===
Pos	Team	Pld	W	D	L	GF	GA	GD	Pts	Promotion, qualification or relegation
1	Cribbs (C, P)	38	32	4	2	94	15	+79	100	Promotion to the Southern League
2	Malvern Town (O, P)	38	29	5	4	110	45	+65	92	Qualification for an inter-step play-off
3	Corsham Town	38	28	7	3	97	31	+66	91	
4	Worcester Raiders	38	23	7	8	103	48	+55	76	
5	Royal Wootton Bassett Town	38	19	8	11	67	50	+17	65	
6	Roman Glass St George	38	19	7	12	76	47	+29	64	
7	Westfields	38	18	10	10	67	42	+25	64	
8	Hereford Pegasus	38	18	5	15	69	68	+1	59	
9	Brimscombe & Thrupp	38	14	10	14	75	62	+13	52	
10	Wantage Town	38	14	8	16	70	67	+3	50	
11	Mangotsfield United	38	15	4	19	58	70	−12	49	
12	Longlevens	38	12	6	20	54	63	−9	42	
13	Fairford Town	38	12	5	21	54	66	−12	41	
14	Shrivenham	38	11	5	22	42	94	−52	38	Resigned to the Wiltshire League
15	Lydney Town	38	10	7	21	47	91	−44	37	
16	Thornbury Town	38	10	5	23	49	76	−27	35	
17	Hereford Lads Club	38	10	4	24	47	83	−36	34	
18	Tuffley Rovers	38	9	6	23	48	84	−36	33	
19	Bradford Town (R)	38	7	6	25	45	93	−48	27	Relegation to the Western League
20	Chipping Sodbury Town (R)	38	6	9	23	42	119	−77	27	Relegation to Division One

Source: Hellenic League
Rules for classification: 1) points; 2) goal difference; 3) number of goals scored; 4) number of matches won; 5) head-to-head results
(C) Champions; (O) Play-off winners; (P) Promoted; (R) Relegated

=== Play-off ===
Inter-step play-off

29 April 2023	Highworth Town	1–4	Malvern Town	Highworth
15:00	Edenborough 28'	Report	Turner 32', 55' (pen.), 90+4'; Spurrier 79'	Stadium: The Elms Recreation Ground; Attendance: 474

=== Stadiums and locations ===
Location of 2022–23 Hellenic League Premier Division clubs
Location of 2022–23 Hellenic League Premier Division clubs (Gloucestershire)

Team	Location	Stadium	Capacity
Bradford Town	Bradford on Avon	Trowbridge Road	1,800
Brimscombe & Thrupp	Brimscombe	The Meadow	
Chipping Sodbury Town	Chipping Sodbury	The Ridings	
Corsham Town	Corsham	Southbank	1,200
Cribbs	Bristol	The Lawns	1,000
Fairford Town	Fairford	Cinder Lane	2,000
Hereford Lads Club	Hereford	County Ground	
Hereford Pegasus	Hereford	Old School Lane	2,000
Longlevens	Gloucester	Saw Mills End	
Lydney Town	Lydney	Lydney Recreation Ground	700
Malvern Town	Malvern	Langland Stadium	2,500
Mangotsfield United	Mangotsfield	Cossham Street	2,500
Roman Glass St George	Almondsbury	Oaklands Park	2,000
Royal Wootton Bassett Town	Royal Wootton Bassett	New Gerard Buxton Sports Ground	2,000
Shrivenham	Shrivenham	Barrington Park	
Thornbury Town	Thornbury	Mundy Playing Fields	
Tuffley Rovers	Tuffley	Glevum Park	1,000
Wantage Town	Wantage	Alfredian Park	1,500
Westfields	Hereford	allpay.park	2,000
Worcester Raiders	Worcester	Sixways Stadium	11,499

== Division One ==
Hellenic Football League Division One
- Season: 2022–23
- Dates: 6 August 2022 – 28 April 2023
- Champions: Pershore Town
- Promoted: Pershore Town; Milton United
- Relegated: Littleton
- Matches: 342
- Goals: 1,256 (3.67 per match)

=== Team changes ===
To Division One

Promoted from the Herefordshire FA County League

- Hartpury University

Promoted from the Oxfordshire Senior League

- Southam United

Relegated from the Premier Division

- Calne Town

Transferred from the Spartan South Midlands League Division One

- Kidlington Reserves
- Long Crendon

From Division One

Promoted to the Premier Division

- Hereford Pegasus
- Worcester Raiders

Promoted to the Midland League Premier Division

- Studley

=== Division One table ===
Pos	Team	Pld	W	D	L	GF	GA	GD	Pts	Promotion, qualification or relegation
1	Pershore Town (C, P)	36	30	2	4	126	26	+100	92	Promotion to the Premier Division
2	Hartpury University	36	25	7	4	100	22	+78	82	Qualification for the play-offs
3	Milton United (O, P)	36	25	5	6	94	39	+55	80	Promotion to the Combined Counties League
4	Clanfield	36	24	2	10	76	38	+38	74	Qualification for the play-offs
5	FC Stratford	36	19	7	10	80	53	+27	64	Qualification for the play-offs
6	Calne Town	36	19	5	12	64	46	+18	62	
7	Abingdon United	36	19	5	12	64	54	+10	62	
8	Malmesbury Victoria	36	18	5	13	70	58	+12	59	
9	Shortwood United	36	16	8	12	72	44	+28	56	
10	Long Crendon	36	15	7	14	61	70	−9	52	
11	Southam United	36	15	6	15	64	71	−7	51	
12	Stonehouse Town	36	16	2	18	60	58	+2	50	
13	Cheltenham Saracens	36	14	6	16	64	64	0	48	
14	Bourton Rovers	36	13	5	18	53	71	−18	41 (Note: Bourton Rovers were deducted 3 points.)	
15	Newent Town	36	9	6	21	51	101	−50	33	
16	Kidlington Reserves	36	8	3	25	57	95	−38	27	
17	Moreton Rangers	36	7	4	25	34	83	−49	25	
18	Littleton (R)	36	3	5	28	39	110	−71	14	Relegation to the Midland League
19	Cirencester Town Development	36	1	2	33	27	153	−126	5	Folded

Source: Hellenic League
Rules for classification: 1) points; 2) goal difference; 3) number of goals scored; 4) number of matches won; 5) head-to-head results
(C) Champions; (O) Play-off winners; (P) Promoted; (R) Relegated

=== Play-offs ===
Semifinals
2	Hartpury University	4
5	FC Stratford	0
3	Milton United	3 (3)
2	Clanfield 85	3 (2)

Final
2	Hartpury University	2 (1)
3	Milton United	2 (4)

==== Semifinals ====
25 April 2023	Hartpury University	4–0	FC Stratford	Hartpury
				Stadium: Hartpury University Stadium; Attendance: 103

25 April 2023	Milton United	3–3 (a.e.t.) (3–2 p)	Clanfield 85	Milton
				Stadium: Potash Lane

==== Final ====
28 April 2023	Hartpury University	2–2 (a.e.t.) (1–4 p)	Milton United	Hartpury
				Stadium: Hartpury University Stadium; Attendance: 103

=== Stadiums and locations ===
Location of the clubs in the 2022–23 Hellenic League Division One
Location of the clubs in the 2022–23 Hellenic League Division One (Gloucestershire)

Team	Location	Stadium	Capacity
Abingdon United	Abingdon-on-Thames	The Northcourt	2,000
Bourton Rovers	Bourton-on-the-Water	Rissington Road	
Calne Town	Calne	Bremhill View	2,500
Cheltenham Saracens	Cheltenham	Petersfield Park	
Cirencester Town development	Cirencester	Corinium Stadium	4,500
Clanfield 85	Clanfield	Radcot Road	2,000
FC Stratford	Tiddington	Knights Lane	
Hartpury University	Hartpury	Hartpury College	
Kidlington reserves	Kidlington	Yarnton Road	1,500
Littleton	North and Middle Littleton	Five Acres	
Long Crendon	Oxford (Marston)	Court Place Farm	2,000
Malmesbury Victoria	Malmesbury	The Flying Monk Ground	
Milton United	Milton	Potash Lane	
Moreton Rangers	Moreton-in-Marsh	London Road	
Newent Town	Newent	Wildsmith Meadow	
Pershore Town	Pershore	Community Stadium	4,000
Shortwood United	Nailsworth	Meadowbank Ground	2,000
Southam United	Southam	Bobby Hancocks Park	1,000
Stonehouse Town	Stonehouse	Magpies Stadium	
