= 2020–21 Western Football League =

Western Football League
- Season: 2020–21

The 2020–21 Western Football League season (known as the 2020–21 Toolstation Western Football League for sponsorship reasons) was the 119th in the history of the Western Football League, a football competition in England. Teams were divided into two divisions; the Premier and the First.

The constitution was announced on 21 July 2020.

After the abandonment of the previous season due to the COVID-19 pandemic, the league's constitution remained unchanged, with the planned structural changes being put back to this season.

This season, the Premier Division champions were to be promoted to Step 4. The runners-up in this division and ten other Step 5 divisions in other leagues would be ranked according to PPG (points per game), and the top four in that ranking would also be promoted. The remaining seven runners-up were to compete in "winner takes all" play-offs with seven clubs finishing bottom in Step 4 leagues, the winners being placed at Step 4 and the losers at Step 5 for 2021–22.

The bottom clubs in all 14 Step 5 divisions were to be ranked according to PPG, with the 12 lowest-ranked clubs relegated to Step 6.

In Division One, the top four clubs were to be promoted to Step 5, with the bottom two liable to relegation to Step 7.

== Suspension and curtailment ==
Fixtures were temporarily suspended on 30 December 2020, again due to the COVID-19 pandemic, but were suspended until further notice on 14 January 2021. The FA curtailed the season on 24 February, with no further league fixtures to be played.

== Premier Division ==
The Premier Division remained unchanged, with 21 clubs.

=== League table at time of curtailment ===
Pos	Team	Pld	W	D	L	GF	GA	GD	Pts	Promotion
1	Plymouth Parkway	13	11	2	0	50	10	+40	35	Promotion to the Southern League (Note: Plymouth Parkway promoted based on points per game calculations from 2019–20 and 2020–21 seasons combined.)
2	Tavistock	11	8	1	2	34	18	+16	25	
3	Exmouth Town	11	8	0	3	32	16	+16	24	
4	Clevedon Town	13	7	3	3	26	18	+8	24	
5	Cribbs	12	7	2	3	24	16	+8	23	Transfer to the Hellenic League
6	Westbury United	12	7	2	3	22	17	+5	23	Transfer to the Hellenic League
7	Street	13	7	1	5	33	26	+7	22	
8	Roman Glass St George	12	7	0	5	19	15	+4	21	Transfer to the Hellenic League
9	Buckland Athletic	15	6	3	6	23	22	+1	21	
10	Bitton	8	6	0	2	29	13	+16	18	
11	Bradford Town	14	5	3	6	28	29	−1	18	Transfer to the Hellenic League
12	Shepton Mallet	11	4	4	3	20	19	+1	16	
13	Bridgwater Town	11	5	1	5	18	20	−2	16	
14	Keynsham Town	13	4	3	6	18	21	−3	15	
15	Brislington	12	4	2	6	22	29	−7	14	
16	Cadbury Heath	10	4	0	6	18	23	−5	12	
17	Wellington	14	3	3	8	15	29	−14	12	
18	Odd Down	13	3	1	9	15	38	−23	10	Voluntary relegation to Division One
19	Hallen	14	2	3	9	25	37	−12	9	Transfer to the Hellenic League
20	Bridport	10	1	0	9	6	31	−25	3	
21	Chipping Sodbury Town	12	0	2	10	9	39	−30	2	Transfer to the Hellenic League

Source: Western League
Rules for classification: 1) points; 2) goal difference; 3) number of goals scored.

=== Stadia and locations ===
Club	Finishing position in 2018–19	Stadium
Bitton	3rd	Rapid Solicitors Stadium
Bradford Town	7th	Bradford on Avon Sports Club
Bridgwater Town	4th	Fairfax Park
Bridport	13th	St Mary's Field
Brislington	18th	Brislington Stadium
Buckland Athletic	9th	Kingskerswell Road
Cadbury Heath	14th	Springfield
Chipping Sodbury Town	10th	The Ridings
Clevedon Town	6th	The Hand Stadium
Cribbs	8th	The Lawns
Exmouth Town	2nd South West Peninsula League Premier Division (promotion)	King George V Ground
Hallen	12th	The Hallen Centre
Keynsham Town	1st Western League Division One (promotion)	Crown Fields
Odd Down	15th	Lew Hill Memorial Ground
Plymouth Parkway	2nd	Bolitho Park
Roman Glass St George	17th	Oaklands Park
Shepton Mallet	11th	Playing Fields (Shepton)
Street	8th Southern League Division One South (voluntary relegation)	The Tannery Ground
Tavistock	1st South West Peninsula League Premier Division (promotion)	Langsford Park
Wellington	16th	The Playing Field (Wellington)
Westbury United	5th	Meadow Lane

== First Division ==
The First Division also remained unchanged, with 20 clubs.

=== League table at time of curtailment ===
Pos	Team	Pld	W	D	L	GF	GA	GD	Pts	Promotion
1	Corsham Town	10	9	1	0	35	13	+22	28	Promotion and transfer to Hellenic League (Note: Promotions based on points per game calculations from 2019–20 and 2020–21 seasons combined.)
2	Welton Rovers	11	8	2	1	29	12	+17	26	
3	Calne Town	9	8	0	1	23	6	+17	24	Promotion and transfer to Hellenic League
4	Ashton & Backwell United	10	7	2	1	26	14	+12	23	Promotion to Premier Division
5	Wincanton Town	12	6	2	4	26	20	+6	20	
6	Warminster Town	11	6	1	4	27	16	+11	19	
7	Radstock Town	10	6	0	4	23	19	+4	18	
8	Wells City	10	5	1	4	19	17	+2	16	
9	Bishop Sutton	10	5	1	4	17	18	−1	16	
10	Almondsbury	11	5	1	5	18	24	−6	16	
11	Lebeq United	9	4	2	3	20	17	+3	14	
12	Portishead Town	10	4	2	4	16	14	+2	14	
13	Sherborne Town	11	4	1	6	17	19	−2	13	
14	Bristol Telephones	9	4	0	5	20	21	−1	12	
15	Hengrove Athletic	9	3	3	3	10	12	−2	12	
16	Cheddar	10	4	0	6	21	24	−3	12	
17	Bishops Lydeard	11	1	1	9	12	28	−16	4	
18	Oldland Abbotonians	9	1	0	8	8	23	−15	3	
19	Longwell Green Sports	10	0	1	9	11	34	−23	1	
20	Devizes Town	10	0	1	9	11	38	−27	1	

Source: Western League
Rules for classification: 1) points; 2) goal difference; 3) number of goals scored.

=== Stadia and locations ===
Club	Finishing position in 2018–19	Stadium
Almondsbury	6th Hellenic Football League Division One West (transferred)	Almondsbury Sports & Social Club
Ashton & Backwell United	4th	Lancer Scott Stadium
Bishop Sutton	17th	Lakeview
Bishops Lydeard	12th	Cothelstone Road
Bristol Telephones	20th	BTRA Sports Ground
Calne Town	8th	Bremhill Road
Cheddar	2nd	Bowdens Park
Corsham Town	3rd	Southbank Ground
Devizes Town	11th	Nursteed Road Ground
Hengrove Athletic	19th Western Football League Premier Division (relegated)	Paprika Park
Lebeq United	1st Gloucestershire County League (promoted)	Oaklands Park
Longwell Green Sports	5th	Longwell Green Community Centre
Oldland Abbotonians	18th	Aitchinson Playing Fields
Portishead Town	16th	Bristol Road
Radstock Town	15th	Southfields Recreation Ground
Sherborne Town	13th	Raleigh Grove
Warminster Town	6th	Weymouth Street
Wells City	10th	Athletic Ground (Wells)
Welton Rovers	9th	West Clewes
Wincanton Town	14th	Wincanton Sports Ground
