= 2022–23 Southern Football League =

The 2022–23 Southern Football League season was the 120th in the history of the Southern League since its establishment in 1894. The league has two Premier divisions (Central and South) at Step 3 of the National League System (NLS) and two Division One divisions (Central and South) at Step 4. These correspond to levels 7 and 8 of the English football league system.

The allocations for Step 4 this season were announced by The Football Association (FA) on 12 May 2022.

== Premier Division Central ==
Southern Football League Premier Division Central
- Season: 2022–23

Premier Division Central comprises 22 teams, one more than the set of 21 which competed in the previous season.

=== Team changes ===
To the Premier League Central

Promoted from the Division One Central

- Bedford Town

Promoted from the Northern Premier League Division One Midlands

- Ilkeston Town

Transferred from the Northern Premier League Premier Division

- Basford United
- Mickleover

Transferred from the Premier Division South

- Kings Langley

From the Premier Division Central

Promoted to the National League North

- Banbury United
- Peterborough Sports

Relegated to Division One Central

- Biggleswade Town

Relegated to the Isthmian League North Division

- Lowestoft Town

=== Premier Division Central table ===
Pos	Team	Pld	W	D	L	GF	GA	GD	Pts	Promotion, qualification or relegation
1	Tamworth (C, P)	42	27	8	7	93	40	+53	89	Promoted to the National League North
2	Coalville Town	42	27	8	7	92	42	+50	89	Qualified for the play-offs (Note: Four teams played for one spot and promotion to Step 2.)
3	Leiston	42	24	13	5	84	47	+37	85	Qualified for the play-offs
4	Nuneaton Borough	42	23	10	9	67	45	+22	79	Qualified for the play-offs
5	Rushall Olympic (O, P)	42	22	7	13	71	52	+19	73	Qualified for the play-offs
6	Mickleover	42	22	6	14	82	66	+16	72	
7	Ilkeston Town	42	16	13	13	79	66	+13	61	Transferred to the Northern Premier League Premier Division
8	Barwell	42	17	10	15	69	63	+6	61	
9	Redditch United	42	18	7	17	57	59	−2	61	
10	Stourbridge	42	15	14	13	69	56	+13	59	
11	Alvechurch	42	17	8	17	63	65	−2	59	
12	Hitchin Town	42	16	11	15	52	60	−8	59	
13	Royston Town	42	15	10	17	63	73	−10	55	
14	Stratford Town	42	13	13	16	58	70	−12	52	
15	Basford United	42	14	10	18	49	62	−13	52	Transferred to the Northern Premier League Premier Division
16	St Ives Town	42	14	8	20	64	72	−8	50	
17	Needham Market	42	13	9	20	46	54	−8	48	
18	Bromsgrove Sporting	42	13	9	20	58	78	−20	48	
19	Kings Langley (R)	42	10	9	23	45	69	−24	39	Relegated to Division One Central
20	Hednesford Town (R)	42	7	10	25	45	76	−31	31	Relegated to the Northern Premier League Division One West
21	AFC Rushden & Diamonds (R)	42	8	7	27	40	87	−47	31	Relegated to the Northern Premier League Division One Midlands
22	Bedford Town (R)	42	8	6	28	49	93	−44	30	Relegated to Division One Central

Source: Southern League, Non League Matters
Rules for classification: 1) points; 2) goal difference; 3) number of goals scored; 4) number of matches won; 5) head-to-head results
(C) Champions; (O) Play-off winners; (P) Promoted; (R) Relegated

=== Results ===
Home \ Away	RUD	ALV	BAR	BAS	BDT	BRO	COA	HED	HIT	ILK	KLL	LEI	MIC	NEE	NUN	RED	ROY	RUS	STI	STO	STR	TAM
AFC Rushden & Diamonds	—	0–2	0–1	2–0	4–0	1–1	0–7	0–1	1–2	1–1	4–2	0–0	1–4	0–0	2–1	0–2	1–1	1–3	2–1	1–3	0–2	1–3
Alvechurch	2–0	—	2–1	2–1	2–0	0–0	0–3	1–0	1–3	2–1	2–2	3–3	2–1	1–1	1–3	3–3	2–1	1–2	4–1	3–0	4–2	1–3
Barwell	1–2	1–1	—	2–2	1–2	1–1	3–1	5–1	1–2	2–1	0–0	2–3	2–5	2–0	3–1	1–0	2–1	1–2	3–1	1–1	2–1	0–2
Basford United	2–1	3–0	0–4	—	3–1	1–1	0–2	1–0	0–2	2–1	0–1	2–0	1–2	2–1	0–4	0–1	3–1	1–1	1–0	2–1	0–2	1–3
Bedford Town	6–1	0–3	3–2	0–2	—	3–4	2–1	1–3	3–0	2–2	2–0	3–4	0–3	0–1	0–2	0–1	0–2	0–2	1–3	2–4	0–3	1–8
Bromsgrove Sporting	1–1	3–1	2–0	1–1	2–2	—	0–4	3–1	2–1	2–3	2–0	1–7	1–3	2–0	3–0	0–1	2–1	0–1	1–2	3–4	0–1	0–1
Coalville Town	3–0	4–1	3–2	0–1	2–0	1–1	—	3–2	5–1	1–4	2–1	0–0	4–1	1–0	0–2	2–2	2–2	3–1	3–0	3–1	1–1	1–0
Hednesford Town	5–0	1–2	2–2	0–0	1–2	2–3	1–3	—	1–0	2–2	1–0	1–3	0–3	4–0	1–2	0–1	3–3	0–0	2–2	0–0	2–0	0–1
Hitchin Town	2–1	2–1	1–1	0–0	0–0	2–0	2–2	1–1	—	3–1	2–4	0–3	4–1	1–0	1–1	2–1	1–0	0–0	1–1	1–1	1–0	0–1
Ilkeston Town	3–1	3–0	2–0	1–1	3–2	3–1	1–2	4–1	3–1	—	3–0	2–2	2–3	3–3	2–3	1–1	3–3	1–1	2–3	0–2	2–1	0–2
Kings Langley	1–2	1–1	0–2	1–1	3–1	2–5	1–3	2–1	0–1	1–2	—	1–1	2–2	0–2	1–2	2–0	1–0	0–1	0–1	2–3	1–1	1–1
Leiston	5–1	1–1	2–0	6–2	3–0	3–2	1–0	1–0	0–0	2–1	1–2	—	3–1	2–1	3–2	2–1	3–0	2–1	1–0	1–1	1–1	2–1
Mickleover	2–0	1–0	2–3	2–1	2–0	4–1	2–4	1–1	1–2	1–1	2–0	2–2	—	2–0	3–1	2–1	1–0	2–0	3–2	1–1	4–3	2–3
Needham Market	2–0	0–3	1–2	3–2	0–0	0–1	0–0	1–0	3–0	1–3	1–2	0–1	2–0	—	1–1	1–0	5–0	0–2	4–2	3–1	0–1	3–2
Nuneaton Borough	2–1	3–1	3–1	1–0	2–1	4–0	0–1	2–1	1–1	2–0	1–1	2–1	4–2	1–1	—	1–0	3–1	0–0	3–0	0–0	1–0	1–1
Redditch United	1–0	1–0	1–3	2–1	3–0	2–0	0–1	1–1	2–1	1–4	2–3	3–1	2–1	3–1	1–2	—	4–2	2–3	2–0	0–3	2–2	0–3
Royston Town	2–1	1–0	2–4	3–1	3–2	4–0	1–1	2–0	4–2	1–2	1–0	1–1	1–1	1–0	1–0	0–0	—	2–1	1–3	3–3	4–2	0–2
Rushall Olympic	3–1	1–4	1–1	0–1	1–3	3–1	0–3	3–0	3–1	2–0	2–1	0–2	1–3	1–0	3–0	7–2	2–3	—	1–0	2–0	4–3	2–2
St Ives Town	3–1	3–1	1–1	2–2	2–0	1–2	1–3	2–0	3–2	2–2	2–0	1–2	2–0	1–1	1–2	1–2	0–2	0–2	—	1–5	5–0	2–0
Stourbridge	0–2	0–2	0–1	1–2	2–1	1–1	2–3	3–1	3–0	1–2	2–1	1–1	1–2	0–0	0–0	0–3	5–1	2–0	2–2	—	4–0	1–1
Stratford Town	2–0	2–0	1–1	2–2	1–1	4–2	1–0	1–0	1–2	1–1	1–2	1–1	2–1	4–2	1–1	2–0	1–1	0–5	3–3	1–1	—	0–4
Tamworth	2–2	3–0	4–1	2–1	2–2	1–0	1–4	9–1	2–1	1–1	3–0	3–1	3–1	0–1	3–0	0–0	3–0	3–1	2–1	0–3	2–0	—

Source: Southern League
Legend: Blue = home team win; Yellow = draw; Red = away team win.

=== Play-offs ===
Semifinals
2	Coalville Town	1 (3)
5	Rushall Olympic	1 (4)
3	Leiston	1
4	Nuneaton Borough	2

Final
5	Rushall Olympic	0 (4)
4	Nuneaton Borough	0 (3)

Semi-finals

26 April 2023	Coalville Town	1–1 (a.e.t.) (3–4 p)	Rushall Olympic	Coalville
19:45	McGlinchey 88'	Report	Landell 46'	Stadium: Owen Street Sports Ground; Attendance: 1,610; Referee: Richard Eley
	Penalties
	Putman (penalty scored); Thanoj (penalty scored); Shaw (penalty missed); Smith (penalty scored); Berridge (penalty missed)		Fletcher (penalty scored); Cook (penalty scored); Whittall (penalty scored); Shorrock (penalty scored); Batchelor (penalty missed)

26 April 2023	Leiston	1–2 (a.e.t.)	Nuneaton Borough	Leiston
19:45	Quantrell 75'	Report	Richards 49'; Waite 102'	Stadium: Victory Road; Attendance: 464

Final

1 May 2023	Nuneaton Borough	0–0 (a.e.t.) (3–4 p)	Rushall Olympic	Nuneaton
15:00		Report		Stadium: Liberty Way; Attendance: 3,563
	Penalties
	Beswick (penalty scored); Storer (penalty scored); Benbow (penalty scored); Rowe-Turner (penalty missed); Dinanga (penalty missed)		Whittall (penalty scored); Cook (penalty scored); Carvalho-Landell (penalty scored); Shorrock (penalty scored); Green (penalty missed)

=== Stadia and locations ===
Locations of the Premier Division Central clubs

Club	Location	Stadium	Capacity
AFC Rushden & Diamonds	Rushden	Hayden Road	2,000
Alvechurch	Alvechurch	Lye Meadow	3,000
Barwell	Barwell	Kirkby Road	2,500
Basford United	Nottingham (Basford)	Greenwich Avenue	2,200
Bedford Town	Bedford	The Eyrie	3,000
Bromsgrove Sporting	Bromsgrove	Victoria Ground	4,893
Coalville Town	Coalville	Owen Street Sports Ground	2,000
Hednesford Town	Hednesford	Keys Park	6,039
Hitchin Town	Hitchin	Top Field	4,554
Ilkeston Town	Ilkeston	New Manor Ground	3,029
Kings Langley	Kings Langley	Sadiku Stadium	1,963
Leiston	Leiston	Victory Road	2,250
Mickleover	Derby (Mickleover)	Station Road	1,500
Needham Market	Needham Market	Bloomfields	4,000
Nuneaton Borough	Nuneaton	Liberty Way	4,614
Redditch United	Redditch	The Valley	5,000
Royston Town	Royston	Garden Walk	5,000
Rushall Olympic	Walsall (Rushall)	Dales Lane	2,000
St Ives Town	St Ives	Westwood Road	2,000
Stourbridge	Stourbridge	War Memorial Athletic Ground	2,626
Stratford Town	Stratford-upon-Avon	Knights Lane	2,000
Tamworth	Tamworth	The Lamb Ground	4,565

== Premier Division South ==
Southern Football League Premier Division South
- Season: 2022–23

Premier Division South comprises 22 teams, 17 of which competed in the previous season.

=== Team changes ===
To the Premier Division South

Promoted from Division One Central

- North Leigh

Promoted from Division One South

- Plymouth Parkway
- Winchester City

Promoted from the Isthmian League South Central Division

- Bracknell Town
- Hanwell Town

From the Premier Division South

Promoted to the National League South

- Farnborough
- Taunton Town

Relegated to Division One South

- Wimborne Town

Club folded

- Walton Casuals

Transferred back to the Premier Division Central

- Kings Langley

=== Premier Division South table ===
Pos	Team	Pld	W	D	L	GF	GA	GD	Pts	Promotion, qualification or relegation
1	Weston-super-Mare (C, P)	42	28	9	5	89	32	+57	93	Promoted to the National League South
2	Bracknell Town	42	28	6	8	100	53	+47	90	Qualified for the play-offs (Note: Four teams played for one spot and promotion to Step 2)
3	Truro City (O, P)	42	27	8	7	88	41	+47	89	Qualified for the play-offs
4	Poole Town	42	23	11	8	86	51	+35	80	Qualified for the play-offs
5	Chesham United	42	23	10	9	88	57	+31	79	Qualified for the play-offs
6	Swindon Supermarine	42	23	8	11	88	66	+22	77	
7	Hayes & Yeading United	42	21	8	13	80	58	+22	71	
8	Metropolitan Police (R)	42	18	7	17	61	59	+2	61	Relegated to the Isthmian League South Central Division
9	Merthyr Town	42	18	6	18	73	64	+9	60	
10	Plymouth Parkway	42	16	10	16	63	62	+1	58	
11	Beaconsfield Town	42	15	12	15	75	73	+2	57	
12	Tiverton Town	42	15	10	17	62	77	−15	55	
13	Dorchester Town	42	16	6	20	57	79	−22	54	
14	Hanwell Town	42	14	8	20	55	65	−10	50	
15	Salisbury	42	14	7	21	55	71	−16	49	
16	Winchester City	42	12	12	18	56	72	−16	48	
17	Gosport Borough	42	14	5	23	58	78	−20	47	
18	Hendon	42	9	11	22	55	81	−26	38	
19	Harrow Borough	42	9	10	23	44	80	−36	37	
20	North Leigh (R)	42	9	7	26	50	86	−36	34	Relegated to Division One Central
21	Yate Town (R)	42	9	7	26	50	92	−42	34	Relegated to Division One South
22	Hartley Wintney (R)	42	8	8	26	40	76	−36	32	Relegated to the Isthmian League South Central Division

Source: Southern League, Non League Matters
Rules for classification: 1) points; 2) goal difference; 3) number of goals scored; 4) number of matches won; 5) head-to-head results
(C) Champions; (O) Play-off winners; (P) Promoted; (R) Relegated
Notes:

Metropolitan Police chose to relegate themselves.

=== Results ===
Home \ Away	BEA	BRA	CHE	DOR	GOS	HAN	HAB	HAR	HAY	HEN	MER	MET	NOR	PLY	POO	SAL	SWI	TIV	TRU	WSM	WIN	YAT
Beaconsfield Town	—	2–3	5–2	0–1	3–2	2–2	1–3	1–0	5–2	1–1	3–5	2–2	3–3	3–1	0–2	2–1	2–3	1–2	3–2	1–0	0–1	3–2
Bracknell Town	3–1	—	0–3	2–0	3–1	1–1	4–1	5–0	2–2	3–2	1–0	3–2	6–0	0–0	0–2	6–1	4–2	2–1	0–3	2–2	3–1	0–3
Chesham United	4–2	2–1	—	2–0	2–1	2–2	2–2	1–0	0–3	2–0	1–2	3–2	1–0	4–0	2–2	3–1	1–1	3–0	3–1	1–1	1–1	5–1
Dorchester Town	0–2	1–2	1–3	—	2–2	3–0	3–2	4–2	1–3	3–2	0–2	1–0	2–1	3–1	1–6	1–0	3–4	1–2	1–0	0–3	2–1	2–0
Gosport Borough	3–2	0–4	2–3	2–2	—	0–2	1–3	1–0	3–2	1–0	3–2	0–2	2–0	5–1	1–2	0–0	3–1	2–1	0–1	0–4	2–2	0–1
Hanwell Town	1–1	2–3	2–0	2–1	4–1	—	1–1	3–2	3–2	1–1	0–2	0–1	5–1	1–0	0–2	0–3	1–3	1–0	1–3	0–1	1–2	3–1
Harrow Borough	1–0	0–4	2–1	1–2	0–2	0–1	—	1–0	1–2	1–3	1–2	0–2	1–0	0–1	2–1	0–1	1–3	2–2	1–4	1–5	1–1	3–1
Hartley Wintney	0–3	1–2	1–5	2–4	3–1	2–1	1–0	—	0–0	2–3	1–2	1–1	1–0	4–4	1–1	1–3	0–3	1–2	0–1	0–0	1–1	3–0
Hayes & Yeading United	2–2	2–1	0–3	4–0	3–2	1–0	2–2	1–2	—	1–0	3–2	3–2	3–1	2–1	1–1	1–0	0–0	7–0	3–4	0–1	4–0	3–0
Hendon	1–1	3–4	0–0	0–0	2–0	1–0	3–0	1–0	1–2	—	1–1	2–3	0–2	3–1	0–4	1–4	2–2	2–2	2–2	2–3	0–2	0–1
Merthyr Town	3–2	1–3	0–1	1–3	2–3	3–1	2–2	4–1	1–3	1–2	—	1–2	0–3	0–1	1–2	5–0	2–1	2–0	2–1	2–3	5–2	1–2
Metropolitan Police	2–3	0–1	1–0	1–3	2–1	2–0	1–3	3–1	2–1	2–1	0–2	—	1–1	1–0	1–3	0–3	1–0	4–1	1–2	0–0	2–1	0–1
North Leigh	0–2	0–5	2–3	2–0	0–1	2–0	2–0	3–0	1–1	0–2	0–2	0–2	—	1–2	0–4	1–1	1–2	4–2	1–2	2–0	2–4	3–3
Plymouth Parkway	1–1	1–3	2–2	3–0	2–0	1–1	4–0	0–0	3–1	6–0	0–1	0–1	1–1	—	4–0	3–1	2–1	4–2	3–3	1–4	1–0	2–1
Poole Town	2–2	2–2	3–3	3–0	1–1	3–2	1–0	1–0	2–1	4–3	2–0	1–1	2–1	0–0	—	1–2	2–2	2–4	3–0	1–3	1–0	5–0
Salisbury	1–0	2–1	1–2	2–2	1–3	2–0	0–0	1–3	0–2	3–3	1–2	1–4	4–2	0–1	1–3	—	2–1	0–1	0–3	1–1	1–2	0–0
Swindon Supermarine	1–1	1–2	5–3	3–2	3–1	1–1	2–1	1–0	3–5	4–1	2–1	4–2	2–1	3–0	2–1	1–0	—	3–3	3–2	0–0	1–2	2–0
Tiverton Town	1–2	1–1	2–1	3–0	1–0	2–3	0–0	1–0	0–0	1–0	2–2	3–2	2–1	1–1	2–1	2–4	1–3	—	1–1	0–2	2–4	4–2
Truro City	1–1	1–0	3–1	4–0	1–0	1–0	2–1	1–1	1–0	4–1	0–0	2–0	6–0	1–3	1–1	4–0	4–0	3–2	—	0–0	3–0	4–0
Weston-super-Mare	2–2	1–3	1–3	3–1	3–0	3–0	7–0	4–0	1–0	4–1	1–0	1–1	3–0	1–0	2–0	3–1	3–1	2–1	0–1	—	3–1	3–2
Winchester City	4–0	2–3	1–1	1–1	0–1	0–3	0–0	2–1	3–0	1–1	2–2	1–1	2–2	2–1	0–3	0–1	1–6	1–2	1–3	0–1	—	1–0
Yate Town	0–2	0–2	0–3	0–0	5–4	2–3	3–3	0–1	1–2	2–1	2–2	2–1	1–3	4–0	2–3	0–4	1–2	0–0	1–2	0–4	3–3	—

Source: Southern League
Legend: Blue = home team win; Yellow = draw; Red = away team win.

=== Play-offs ===
Semifinals
2	Bracknell Town	1
5	Chesham United	0
3	Truro City	1 (4)
4	Poole Town	1 (1)

Final
2	Bracknell Town	2
3	Truro City	3

Semi-finals

26 April 2023	Bracknell Town	1–0 (a.e.t.)	Chesham United	Sandhurst
19:45	Abisogun 104'	Report		Stadium: SB Stadium; Attendance: 734; Referee: Charles Martland

26 April 2023	Truro City	1–1 (a.e.t.) (4–1 p)	Poole Town	Plymouth
19:45	Harvey 61'	Report	Lee 49'	Stadium: Bolitho Park; Attendance: 338; Referee: James Gould
	Penalties
	Harvey (penalty scored); Dean (penalty scored); Greenslade (penalty scored); Sullivan (penalty scored)		Hutchinson (penalty scored); Daws (penalty missed); Pardoe (penalty missed)

Final

1 May 2023	Bracknell Town	2–3	Truro City	Sandhurst
15:00	Sanders 53' pen.; Abisogun 62'	Report	Harvey 45'; Neal 58'; Riley-Lowe 90+4'	Stadium: SB Stadium; Attendance: 1,554

=== Stadium and locations ===
Locations of the Premier Division South clubs
Greater London and environ Premier Division South clubs

Club	Location	Stadium	Capacity
Beaconsfield Town	Beaconsfield	Holloways Park	3,500
Bracknell Town	Sandhurst	SB Stadium	1,950
Chesham United	Chesham	The Meadow	5,000
Dorchester Town	Dorchester	The Avenue Stadium	5,000
Gosport Borough	Gosport	Privett Park	4,500
Hanwell Town	Perivale	Powerday Stadium	3,000
Harrow Borough	Harrow	Earlsmead Stadium	3,000
Hartley Wintney	Hartley Wintney	The Memorial Playing Fields	2,000
Hayes & Yeading United	Hayes, Hillingdon	SkyEx Community Stadium	3,000
Hendon	Hendon	Silver Jubilee Park	2,000
Merthyr Town	Merthyr Tydfil	Penydarren Park	4,000
Metropolitan Police	East Molesey	Imber Court	3,000
North Leigh	North Leigh	Eynsham Hall Park Sports Ground	2,000
Plymouth Parkway	Plymouth	Bolitho Park	3,500
Poole Town	Poole	The BlackGold Stadium	2,500
Salisbury	Salisbury	Raymond McEnhill Stadium	5,000
Swindon Supermarine	Swindon (South Marston)	Hunts Copse Ground	3,000
Tiverton Town	Tiverton	Ladysmead	3,500
Truro City	Plymouth	Bolitho Park (groundshare with Plymouth Parkway)	3,500
Weston-super-Mare	Weston-super-Mare	Woodspring Stadium	3,500
Winchester City	Winchester	The City Ground	4,500
Yate Town	Yate	Lodge Road	2,000

== Division One Central ==
Southern Football League Division One Central
- Season: 2022–23

Division One Central comprises 20 teams, 15 of which competed in the previous season.

=== Team changes ===
To Division One Central

Promoted from the Essex Senior League

- Walthamstow

Promoted from the Spartan South Midlands League Premier Division

- Hadley

Relegated from the Premier Division Central

- Biggleswade Town

Transferred from Division One South

- Cirencester Town
- Highworth Town

From Division One Central

Promoted to the Premier Division Central

- Bedford Town

Promoted to the Premier Division South

- North Leigh

Relegated to the Hellenic League Premier Division

- Wantage Town

Relegated to the Spartan South Midlands League Premier Division

- Colney Heath

Transferred to the Northern Premier League Division One Midlands

- St Neots Town

=== Division One Central table ===
Pos	Team	Pld	W	D	L	GF	GA	GD	Pts	Promotion, qualification or relegation
1	Berkhamsted (C, P)	36	28	4	4	91	32	+59	88	Promoted to the Premier Division Central
2	Biggleswade	36	20	9	7	73	44	+29	69	Qualified for the play-offs (Note: Four teams played for one spot and possible promotion to Step 3.)
3	Didcot Town (O, P)	36	20	6	10	55	42	+13	66	Qualified for the play-offs
4	Walthamstow	36	19	6	11	58	49	+9	63	Qualified for the play-offs, then transferred to the Isthmian League North
5	Ware	36	19	5	12	76	60	+16	62	Qualified for the play-offs
6	Cirencester Town	36	17	7	12	67	39	+28	58	
7	Biggleswade Town	36	16	10	10	70	54	+16	58	
8	Welwyn Garden City	36	16	7	13	56	60	−4	55	
9	Hadley	36	15	8	13	64	55	+9	53	
10	Kidlington	36	15	8	13	47	48	−1	53	
11	Waltham Abbey	36	14	6	16	55	51	+4	48	
12	Thame United	36	13	8	15	60	54	+6	47	
13	AFC Dunstable	36	12	10	14	53	47	+6	46	
14	Hertford Town	36	11	8	17	70	70	0	41	
15	Aylesbury United	36	11	7	18	41	64	−23	40	
16	Kempston Rovers	36	9	7	20	51	69	−18	34	
17	Highworth Town (R)	36	6	10	20	51	93	−42	28	Qualified for the inter-step play-offs
18	Barton Rovers (O)	36	5	8	23	32	78	−46	23	Qualified for the inter-step play-offs
19	FC Romania (R)	36	6	6	24	36	97	−61	21 (Note: FC Romania were deducted three points for playing an ineligible player.)	Relegated to the Spartan South Midlands League
20	Harlow Town	0	0	0	0	0	0	0	0	Resigned from the league

Source: Southern League, Non League Matters
Rules for classification: 1) points; 2) goal difference; 3) number of goals scored; 4) number of matches won; 5) head-to-head results
(C) Champions; (O) Play-off winners; (P) Promoted; (R) Relegated

=== Results ===
Home \ Away	DUN	AYU	BAR	BER	BIG	BIT	CIR	DID	ROM	HAD	HER	HWT	KEM	KID	THM	WAA	WAL	WAR	WGC
AFC Dunstable	—	0–0	4–0	2–4	1–2	1–1	2–0	0–1	5–1	1–1	4–4	3–0	0–0	1–3	1–2	1–0	3–0	3–0	3–1
Aylesbury United	1–1	—	2–1	0–4	0–2	1–3	0–1	0–1	2–1	1–0	0–0	5–1	1–3	2–0	0–2	0–2	0–2	2–1	1–2
Barton Rovers	0–2	0–2	—	1–4	2–2	0–1	0–2	1–0	1–2	0–1	3–1	2–2	2–2	1–0	1–2	0–2	0–3	0–4	0–1
Berkhamsted	4–0	4–0	5–0	—	1–0	1–0	3–2	2–0	6–1	2–1	2–0	5–0	3–1	0–0	1–0	2–1	2–1	0–2	2–2
Biggleswade	3–1	0–2	4–3	2–2	—	0–1	3–1	2–0	8–0	2–3	4–1	0–2	2–2	4–1	2–0	2–1	0–0	3–3	1–0
Biggleswade Town	3–2	4–1	5–1	1–2	0–2	—	0–0	1–2	5–3	3–3	2–2	4–1	2–2	2–2	3–2	2–0	1–1	4–2	2–3
Cirencester Town	1–0	3–0	0–2	3–4	4–1	0–1	—	2–0	3–0	2–2	2–1	1–1	5–0	2–0	1–2	3–3	6–1	3–0	1–2
Didcot Town	3–2	1–1	0–0	0–4	1–0	1–0	1–0	—	4–1	0–1	2–1	2–2	1–0	0–0	2–2	3–2	1–0	0–3	0–1
FC Romania	0–1	4–1	1–1	2–1	0–1	0–0	1–2	2–5	—	4–1	2–1	4–1	0–2	0–1	0–0	0–1	0–0	1–3	0–4
Hadley	0–0	4–3	3–0	1–2	1–2	4–2	1–0	1–3	1–1	—	3–1	5–3	3–2	1–2	2–1	2–0	0–1	0–2	1–1
Hertford Town	0–0	4–4	2–1	3–1	2–2	1–3	1–0	3–5	5–0	1–1	—	2–2	1–2	2–1	4–2	2–3	4–1	1–2	0–2
Highworth Town	1–1	1–2	3–3	1–4	2–2	0–3	0–4	0–6	5–0	1–0	2–3	—	3–3	0–1	1–0	1–0	2–3	2–2	2–4
Kempston Rovers	0–3	1–2	1–2	0–1	1–2	2–0	0–3	1–2	2–1	1–4	3–2	1–1	—	0–1	3–0	0–2	2–3	1–2	5–0
Kidlington	1–1	2–2	0–0	0–4	0–4	0–1	2–0	1–2	3–0	3–2	0–4	5–1	1–1	—	1–0	1–2	0–1	4–1	5–2
Thame United	1–2	1–1	2–0	2–2	2–2	2–3	1–1	3–1	7–2	4–1	2–1	4–0	3–1	0–2	—	1–3	0–1	1–2	2–2
Waltham Abbey	2–1	0–1	5–1	0–2	0–1	3–3	1–1	1–3	2–2	2–0	2–1	3–1	1–2	1–1	1–3	—	2–3	0–1	1–1
Walthamstow	2–0	2–1	1–1	1–2	0–1	3–2	0–0	1–0	6–0	0–4	1–4	2–0	3–2	0–1	0–2	3–2	—	3–0	0–0
Ware	2–1	3–0	5–1	2–0	2–2	3–1	3–4	0–1	3–0	2–2	4–2	1–4	4–1	3–0	1–1	0–3	4–6	—	1–2
Welwyn Garden City	3–0	3–0	2–1	0–3	2–3	1–1	0–4	1–1	3–0	0–4	0–3	3–2	3–1	1–2	3–1	0–1	0–3	1–3	—

Source: Southern League
Legend: Blue = home team win; Yellow = draw; Red = away team win.

=== Play-offs ===
Semifinals
2	Biggleswade	1
5	Ware	4
3	Didcot Town	3
4	Walthamstow	1

Final
3	Didcot Town	1
5	Ware	0

Semi-finals

26 April 2023	Biggleswade	1–4	Ware	Biggleswade
19:45	Newton 34'	Report	Unknown 2'; Adams 44'; Rumens 69'; Ofori 85'	Stadium: The Eyrie; Attendance: 341; Referee: Luke Scott

26 April 2023	Didcot Town	3–1	Walthamstow	Didcot
19:45	McNeill 24'; Osbourne 32'; Smith 90+2'	Report	Anyadike 72'	Stadium: Loop Meadow; Attendance: 628; Referee: Ollie Scott

Final

May 2023	Didcot Town	1–0	Ware	Didcot
15:00	Smith 21' pen.	Report		Stadium: Loop Meadow; Attendance: 1,938

Inter-step play-offs

29 April 2023	Barton Rovers	2–0	Thetford Town	Barton-le-Clay
15:00	Grant 49'; Gauthier 75'	Report		Stadium: Sharpenhoe Road; Attendance: 312

29 April 2023	Highworth Town	1–4	Malvern Town	Highworth
15:00	Edenborough 28'	Report	Turner 32', 55' (pen.), 90+4'; Spurrier 79'	Stadium: The Elms Recreation Ground; Attendance: 474

=== Stadia and locations ===
Locations of Division One Central clubs
Locations of Northern Premier League 2022–23 Division One Central teams (Hertfordshire)

Club	Location	Stadium	Capacity
AFC Dunstable	Dunstable	Creasey Park	3,200
Aylesbury United	Aylesbury	The Meadow (groundshare with Chesham United)	5,000
Barton Rovers	Barton-le-Clay	Sharpenhoe Road	4,000
Berkhamsted	Berkhamsted	Broadwater	2,500
Biggleswade	Biggleswade	The Eyrie (groundshare with Bedford Town)	3,000
Biggleswade Town	Biggleswade	Langford Road	3,000
Cirencester Town	Cirencester	Corinium Stadium	4,500
Didcot Town	Didcot	Loop Meadow	3,000
FC Romania	Cheshunt	Cheshunt Stadium (groundshare with Cheshunt)	3,000
Hadley	London (Arkley)	Brickfield Lane	2,000
Harlow Town	Harlow	The Harlow Arena	3,500
Hertford Town	Hertford	Hertingfordbury Park	6,500
Highworth Town	Highworth	The Elms Recreation Ground	2,000
Kempston Rovers	Kempston	Hillgrounds Leisure	2,000
Kidlington	Kidlington	Yarnton Road	1,500
Thame United	Thame	Meadow View Park	2,000
Waltham Abbey	Waltham Abbey	Capershotts	3,500
Walthamstow	London (Walthamstow)	Wadham Lodge	3,500
Ware	Ware	Wodson Park	3,300
Welwyn Garden City	Welwyn Garden City	Herns Way	1,000

== Division One South ==
Southern Football League Division One South
- Season: 2022–23

Division One South comprises 20 teams, 12 of which competed in the previous season.

=== Team changes ===
To Division One South

Promoted from the Hellenic League Premier Division

- Bishop's Cleeve
- Westbury United

Promoted from the Wessex League Premier Division

- Bashley
- Hamworthy United

Promoted from the Western League Premier Division

- Exmouth Town
- Tavistock

Relegated from the Premier Division South

- Wimborne Town

From Division One South

Promoted to the Premier Division South

- Plymouth Parkway
- Winchester City

Relegated to the Hellenic League Premier Division

- Mangotsfield United

Relegated to the Western League Premier Division

- Barnstaple Town

Transferred to Division One Central

- Cirencester Town
- Highworth Town

=== Division One South table ===
Pos	Team	Pld	W	D	L	GF	GA	GD	Pts	Promotion, qualification or relegation
1	AFC Totton (C, P)	38	27	7	4	88	28	+60	88	Promoted to the Premier Division South
2	Sholing (O, P)	38	24	9	5	75	35	+40	81	Qualified for the play-offs (Note: Four teams played for one spot and possible promotion to Step 3.)
3	Hamworthy United	38	22	8	8	75	51	+24	74	Qualified for the play-offs
4	Evesham United	38	18	6	14	53	44	+9	60	Qualified for the play-offs
5	Wimborne Town	38	17	9	12	60	61	−1	60	Qualified for the play-offs
6	Tavistock	38	18	4	16	66	63	+3	58	
7	Bashley	38	15	10	13	49	37	+12	55	
8	Frome Town	38	15	9	14	62	50	+12	54	
9	Bishop's Cleeve	38	16	4	18	66	74	−8	52	
10	Westbury United	38	13	11	14	51	53	−2	50	
11	Larkhall Athletic	38	12	13	13	44	58	−14	49	
12	Melksham Town	38	13	9	16	64	68	−4	48	
13	Paulton Rovers	38	14	5	19	57	68	−11	47	
14	Exmouth Town	38	12	10	16	50	51	−1	46	
15	Willand Rovers	38	11	11	16	49	47	+2	44	
16	Lymington Town (R)	38	12	7	19	50	67	−17	43	Relegated to the Wessex League
17	Bideford	38	10	12	16	41	57	−16	42	
18	Bristol Manor Farm (O)	38	11	9	18	56	76	−20	42	Qualified for the inter-step play-off
19	Cinderford Town (R)	38	8	10	20	47	85	−38	34	Relegated to the Hellenic League
20	Slimbridge (R)	38	6	9	23	44	74	−30	27	Relegated to the Hellenic League

Source: Southern League website, Non League Matters
Rules for classification: 1) points; 2) goal difference; 3) number of goals scored; 4) number of matches won; 5) head-to-head results
(C) Champions; (O) Play-off winners; (P) Promoted; (R) Relegated

=== Results ===
Home \ Away	TOT	BAS	BID	BIS	BMF	CIN	EVE	EXM	FRO	HMW	LAR	LYM	MEL	PAU	SHO	SLI	TAV	WES	WIL	WIM
AFC Totton	—	1–0	8–1	2–1	4–1	3–0	2–1	1–0	1–1	0–0	1–1	3–1	3–0	7–0	0–1	3–0	6–1	5–3	1–0	1–1
Bashley	0–0	—	0–1	0–4	2–1	3–0	0–0	1–1	1–0	0–1	3–0	1–0	0–2	1–0	1–3	0–1	0–1	0–0	2–1	5–2
Bideford	1–1	0–1	—	1–2	1–0	0–1	0–1	1–1	2–0	1–2	1–0	1–2	1–1	0–2	2–1	2–2	1–1	3–4	1–3	0–1
Bishop's Cleeve	1–2	1–0	1–2	—	2–4	2–2	1–0	2–2	0–2	1–5	4–2	2–3	3–1	2–1	0–2	3–2	4–2	2–1	1–0	3–6
Bristol Manor Farm	2–4	0–3	0–0	1–3	—	3–2	1–3	2–0	1–1	2–1	1–1	1–2	1–5	4–3	1–1	0–3	1–2	1–0	2–1	0–0
Cinderford Town	1–6	1–2	1–1	2–1	1–3	—	3–1		1–3	5–0	1–1	0–2	0–4	0–4	2–2	2–1	0–4	3–2	0–2	1–2
Evesham United	3–2	1–1	2–1	3–0	3–2	0–0	—	2–0	1–0	1–2	5–0	2–1	2–1	2–1	0–2	1–0	0–1	0–2	2–0	1–2
Exmouth Town	1–3	3–2	1–1	1–2	1–1	2–1	4–1	—	5–0	0–1	0–3	0–1	2–0	2–0	2–3	2–2	1–0	0–0	3–3	1–0
Frome Town	0–1	0–1	0–0	2–0	0–0	5–1	1–0	1–0	—	2–0	2–2	1–1	2–1	2–0	2–3	4–1	0–4	3–0	3–3	3–0
Hamworthy United	2–1	1–0	5–1	2–1	5–2	1–1	2–1	3–1	3–2	—	5–0	3–2	2–2	1–1	1–1	1–1	6–2	3–2	0–0	2–1
Larkhall Athletic	0–3	1–1	1–1	3–2	2–1	2–2	2–1	0–1	0–4	0–1	—	0–0	2–2	2–1	2–0	3–1	0–1	2–1	2–1	1–3
Lymington Town	1–2	3–3	0–2	2–2	2–4	1–2	2–0	0–2	0–0	1–0	2–1	—	3–2	0–1	1–1	2–0	3–7	3–0	3–1	0–2
Melksham Town	0–1	0–3	1–0	0–1	3–3	1–1	2–2	1–3	3–2	3–5	1–1	3–2	—	2–3	1–3	3–2	1–2	3–2	3–0	3–1
Paulton Rovers	0–1	2–1	3–2	2–4	3–1	5–2	3–2	1–0	3–2	0–1	2–4	4–1	1–3	—	0–2	3–2	1–4	1–1	0–0	1–1
Sholing	1–0	1–1	1–1	4–1	3–2	2–0	0–2	4–0	3–2	2–0	1–1	1–0	5–1	2–0	—	1–0	4–1	1–1	2–0	0–0
Slimbridge	0–1	1–1	2–3	1–3	1–1	2–3	2–2	0–4	0–1	4–2	0–1	1–0	1–2	1–1	1–3	—	2–4	0–1	0–4	1–0
Tavistock	0–0	0–2	2–0	4–1	1–3	2–0	1–2	3–1	4–3	0–2	0–1	3–1	0–1	1–0	3–2	1–1	—	1–2	0–3	1–2
Westbury United	1–2	2–1	2–3	1–0	0–1	4–1	0–2	1–1	1–0	2–1	0–0	1–1	1–1	0–1	3–2	3–0	1–1	—	1–0	2–1
Willand Rovers	1–2	1–1	0–1	2–2	4–0	2–2	0–1	1–0	2–2	3–3	0–0	3–0	1–0	2–1	0–1	0–2	3–1	0–0	—	1–0
Wimborne Town	0–4	0–5	1–1	2–1	3–2	3–1	0–0	2–1	1–4	2–0	2–0	5–1	1–1	3–2	0–4	3–3	2–0	3–3	2–1	—

Source: Southern League
Legend: Blue = home team win; Yellow = draw; Red = away team win.

=== Play-offs ===
Semifinals
2	Sholing	2
5	Wimborne Town	1
3	Hamworthy United	3
4	Evesham United	0

Final
2	Sholing	2
3	Hamworthy United	0

Semi-finals

26 April 2023	Sholing	2–1	Wimborne Town	Sholing
19:45	Mason 64'; Mason 84'	Report	Bartlett 90+3'	Stadium: Universal Stadium; Attendance: 393; Referee: Will Briers

26 April 2023	Hamworthy United	3–0	Evesham United	Dorchester
19:45	Fletcher 20'; Griffin 35'; Rolls 58'	Report		Stadium: The Avenue Stadium; Attendance: 283; Referee: Harrison Blair

Final

1 May 2023	Sholing	2–0	Hamworthy United	Sholing
15:00	Wort 58'; Mason 61'	Report		Stadium: Universal Stadium; Attendance: 1,289

Inter-step play-off

29 April 2023	Bristol Manor Farm	2–0	Saltash United	Sea Mills
15:00	Robbins 34'; Nielsen 63'			Stadium: The Creek; Attendance: 361; Referee: James Towson

=== Stadia and locations ===
Locations of Division One South clubs

Club	Location	Stadium	Capacity
AFC Totton	Totton	Testwood Stadium	3,000
Bashley	Bashley	Bashley Road	4,250
Bideford	Bideford	The Sports Ground	2,000
Bishop's Cleeve	Bishop's Cleeve	Kayte Lane	1,500
Bristol Manor Farm	Bristol (Sea Mills)	The Creek	2,000
Cinderford Town	Cinderford	Causeway Ground	3,500
Evesham United	Evesham	Jubilee Stadium	3,000
Exmouth Town	Exmouth	Southern Road	n/a
Frome Town	Frome	Badgers Hill	2,000
Hamworthy United	Hamworthy	The Country Ground	2,000
Larkhall Athletic	Bath (Larkhall)	The Plain Ham Ground	1,000
Lymington Town	Lymington	The Sports Ground	n/a
Melksham Town	Melksham	Oakfield Stadium	2,500
Paulton Rovers	Paulton	Athletic Field	2,500
Sholing	Sholing	Universal Stadium	1,000
Slimbridge	Slimbridge	Thornhill Park	1,500
Tavistock	Tavistock	Langsford Park	2,000
Westbury United	Westbury	Meadow Lane	n/a
Willand Rovers	Willand	The Stan Robinson Stadium	1,000
Wimborne Town	Wimborne Minster	The Cuthbury	3,000

== See also ==
- Southern Football League
- 2022–23 Isthmian League
- 2022–23 Northern Premier League
