= Cirencester and District League =

Association football league in England

- Founded: 1921
- Folded: 2020
- Country: England
- Feeder to: Cheltenham Association League; Stroud and District League
- Promotion to: Cheltenham Association League; Stroud and District League
- League cup(s): Alexcars Cirencester Senior Charities Cup; CIA Arthur Shipway Memorial Cup; CIA Mills-Roberts Memorial Cup; Alexcars Cirencester Junior Charities Cup
- Last champions: Fratellos (2019–20)
- Website: Official Website – TheFA.com

The Cirencester and District League was a football competition based in Gloucestershire, England. It had one division until folding in 2020. It was a feeder to the Cheltenham League or the Stroud League with the champion club being able to progress at a level appropriate to its Gloucestershire County FA County Cup classification.
Under the terms of a sponsorship deal, the C&DFL is currently known as the M4 Karting Cirencester and District League.
The league is affiliated to the Gloucestershire County FA.

== Recent champions ==
Season	Division One	Division Two	Division Three
2006–07	Siddington	South Cerney Reserves	
2007–08	Beeches	Taverners III	
2008–09	South Cerney	Stratton United	
2009–10	Bibury	Bibury Reserves	
2010–11	Bibury	Down Ampney	South Cerney Reserves
2011–12	Down Ampney	Bibury Reserves	
2012–13	CHQ United	Corinium Sports	
2013–14	CHQ United	Kingshill Sports	
2014–15	South Cerney	Siddington Sports Vets	
2015–16	Intel FC	The Beeches	
2016–17	Intel FC	Blunsdon FC	
2017–18	Intel FC		
2018–19	Fratellos		
2019–20	Fratellos		

== Final member clubs ==
Division One

- Cricklade Town Development
- Fratellos
- Hatherop
- Intel FC
- Lechlade
- Minety
- Poulton
- Siddington
- South Cerney
- Stratton United
