= Cricklade Town F.C. =

Wiltshire FA

Cricklade Town F.C
- Full name: Cricklade Town Football Club
- Nickname: The Crick
- Founded: 1882
- Ground: Cricklade Leisure Centre, Cricklade
- League: Wiltshire League Premier Division
- 2024–25: Wiltshire League Division One, 1st of 15 (promoted)
Home colours

Cricklade Town Football Club is a football club based in Cricklade, Wiltshire, England. Affiliated to the Wiltshire Football Association, they are currently members of the Wiltshire League Premier Division and play at Cricklade Leisure Centre.

== History ==
They were established in 1882 and initially played in the local Sunday league and then the Cirencester and District League.

In the late 1980s the club then joined the Wiltshire Football League. Starting in Division four of the league, they gained promotion to Division three after the 1994–95 campaign when they finished third. They were promoted again after the 1996–97 season, when they finished as runners-up in Division two, and this was followed by another runners-up spot and promotion the season afterwards, to the newly formed Premier division.

At the end of their third season in the Premier division the club were crowned the 2000–01 champions. Despite this league win the club were denied promotion to the Hellenic Football League due to their ground not meeting the required standards of the league. The following season saw the club finish bottom of the division but they were spared relegation. Two seasons later at the end of the 2004–05 campaign the club finished third, and were promoted to the Hellenic Football League as their application to join the league was successful. The club were placed in Division One West and remained there until the end of their existence.

The club folded just before the start of the 2013–14 season. However it was announced in April 2016 that Cricklade Town had reformed for the 2016–17 season and would play in the Wiltshire League which they stayed in for 5 seasons, more recently moving to play in the Hellenic division 2 south for the 2021–22 season finishing bottom, 2022–23 season will see them play in the Swindon and district premier league.

== Ground ==
Cricklade Town play their home games at Cricklade Leisure Centre, Stones Lane, Cricklade, SN6 6JW.

== Honours ==
=== League honours ===
- Wiltshire Football League Premier Division :
  - Champions (1): 2000–01
- Wiltshire Football League Division Two:
  - runners-up (1): 1997–98
- Wiltshire Football League Division Three:
  - runners-up (1): 1996–97

=== Cup honours ===
- Wiltshire Football League Senior Cup:
  - Winners (2): 1999–00, 2000–01
  - Runners-up (2): 1997–98, 1998–99
- Wiltshire Football League Junior Cup:
  - Winners (1): 1996–97

== Records ==
- Highest League Position: 7th in Hellenic Division One West 2010–11
- Highest Attendance: 213 in August 2009

== Former players ==
A list of players that have played for the club at one stage and meet one of the following criteria:

1. Players that have played/managed in the football league or any foreign equivalent to this level (i.e. fully professional league).
2. Players with full international caps.
- (England) Will Evans
