= Sam Whittall =

English footballer

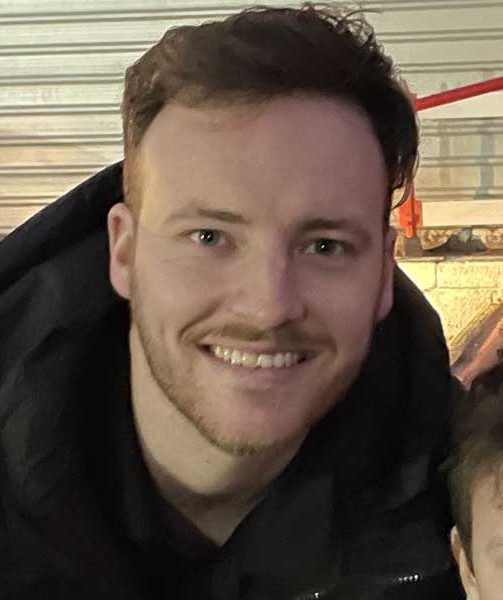
- Whittall in January 2022

Personal information
- Full name: Sam Whittall
- Date of birth: 29 April 1994 (age 32)
- Position: Midfielder

Team information
- Current team: Rushall Olympic

Youth career
- Wolverhampton Wanderers

Senior career*
Years	Team	Apps	(Gls)
2012–2014	Wolverhampton Wanderers	0	(0)
2014–2015	Cambridge United	2	(0)
2014	→ Brackley Town (loan)	34	(2)
2015–2016	Brackley Town	7	(1)
2016	Stourbridge		
2016–2023	Rushall Olympic	154 (Note: Statistics from 2018–19 season and beyond only)	(35)
2023–2025	AFC Telford United	44	(3)
2025–	Rushall Olympic	0	(0)
- * Club domestic league appearances and goals as of 15:45, 19 January 2025 (UTC)

Sam Whittall (born 29 April 1994) is an English footballer who plays for Rushall Olympic, where he plays as a midfielder.

== Playing career ==
=== Wolverhampton Wanderers ===
Whittall progressed through the academy of Wolverhampton Wanderers to sign professional contract in 2012. However, he never made a first team appearance for the club and was released at the end of the 2013–14 season.

=== Cambridge United ===
On 14 August 2014 he signed a six-month contract with League Two club Cambridge United. He made his senior debut on 19 August 2014, coming as a substitute in a 2–2 draw at York City.

=== Brackley Town ===
Whittall joined Brackley Town following his release by Cambridge United.

=== Stourbridge ===
In January 2016 Whittall signed for Stourbridge on a short-term deal until the end of the season.

=== Rushall Olympic ===
For the 2016–17 season, Whittall joined Rushall Olympic, then resigned with the club for the 2017–18 season, as well as 2018–19.

On 3 June 2022, Rushall Olympic confirmed that Whittall had re-signed with the club, and would see him make the 2022–23 season his seventh campaign with the club. He was part of the squad promoted to the National League North for the first time in the club's history following play-off success in May 2023.

=== AFC Telford United ===
In October 2023, Whittall returned to the Southern Football League Premier Division Central with AFC Telford United.

== Career statistics ==
As of match played 14 January 2025

Appearances and goals by club, season and competition
Club	Season	League			FA Cup		EFL Cup		Other		Total	
Club	Season	Division	Apps	Goals	Apps	Goals	Apps	Goals	Apps	Goals	Apps	Goals
Wolverhampton Wanderers	2012–13	Championship	0	0	0	0	0	0	0	0	0	0
Wolverhampton Wanderers	2013–14	League One	0	0	0	0	0	0	0	0	0	0
Cambridge United	2014–15	League Two	2	0	0	0	0	0	1 (Note: Appearances in EFL Trophy)	0	3	0
Brackley Town (loan)	2014–15	Conference North	34	2	0	0	–		0	0	34	2
Brackley Town	2015–16	National League North	7	1	4	1	–		1 (Note: Appearances in Northamptonshire Senior Cup)	1	12	3
Rushall Olympic	2018–19	SL Premier Division Central	31	5	1	0	–		1 (Note: Appearances in Birmingham Senior Cup)	0	33	5
Rushall Olympic	2019–20	SL Premier Division Central	30	13	3	0	–		6 (Note: 1 appearance in FA Trophy, 1 appearance in Southern League Cup, 1 appearance and 1 goal in Staffordshire Senior Cup, 3 appearances and 1 goal in Birmingham Senior Cup)	2	39	15
Rushall Olympic	2020–21	SL Premier Division Central	8	5	1	0	–		2 (Note: Appearances in FA Trophy)	0	11	6
Rushall Olympic	2021–22	SL Premier Division Central	35	4	3	0	–		11 (Note: 5 appearances in Southern League Cup, 3 appearances and 1 goal in Walsall Senior Cup, 2 appearances in FA Trophy, 1 appearance in Premier Division Central play-offs)	1	48	5
Rushall Olympic	2022–23	SL Premier Division Central	39	8	1	0	–		9 (Note: 3 appearances and 3 goals in Walsall Senior Cup, 3 appearances in Staffordshire Senior Cup, 2 appearances in Premier Division Central play-offs, 1 appearance in FA Trophy)	3	47	11
Rushall Olympic	2023–24	National League North	11	0	0	0	–		0	0	11	0
Rushall Olympic	Total		154	35	9	0	–		29	6	192	41
AFC Telford United	2023–24	SL Premier Division Central	25	1	0	0	–		2 (Note: Appearances in Premier Division Central play-offs)	0	27	1
AFC Telford United	2024–25	SL Premier Division Central	19	2	1	0	–		3	0	23	2
AFC Telford United	Total		44	3	1	0	–		5	0	50	3
Career total			241	41	14	1	0	0	35	7	290	49
