= Wiltshire Football Association =

- Formation: 1884
- Purpose: Football association
- Headquarters: Green Lane, Devizes SN10 5EP
- Coordinates: 51.3378°N 1.9842°W
- CEO: Simon Russell
- Website: www.wiltshirefa.com

The Wiltshire Football Association is the governing body of football in the English county of Wiltshire. Affiliated members pay a fee commensurate with the level of competition they play in, and benefit from access to support and guidance on such areas as health and safety, and access to finance or grants. The association is directly responsible for the governance of County Cup competitions.

The association's headquarters are at Green Lane, Devizes, where football pitches and facilities for youth clubs are provided.

== Membership ==
Clubs based within the Wiltshire county boundaries are eligible for affiliation to the association, including those participating at the higher levels of the Football League system. The council has representation from the six geographic areas of the county, namely North Swindon, South Swindon, South Wilts, East Wilts, West Wilts and North West Wilts.

Swindon Town are the highest-placed affiliated club in the county, playing in League Two (tier 4) of the Football League. Chippenham Town are the next highest ranked affiliate, playing in the National League South (tier 6), followed by Swindon Supermarine and Salisbury in the Southern League (tier 8).

The county is in the catchment area of the Wessex Leagues, Hellenic Leagues and the Western Leagues at tier 9 to 11. The Wiltshire Football League, founded in 1976, is also at tier 11, though this extends beyond the boundaries of the Association, with teams from places such as Frome (Somerset) and Kintbury (Berkshire).

== Leagues and competitions ==
The Wiltshire League is the county's Senior League and is wholly in the Association's control. Other leagues include Swindon & District League (1891), Salisbury & District League (1892), Trowbridge & District League (1896), Wiltshire County Women's League (2000), Nadder Valley League (1920) and the Inter Dept. Post Office League (1991).

The Wiltshire County Senior Cup, founded in 1886, is the senior knockout competition in the county and is competed by clubs at tier 9–11. The Wiltshire Premier Shield was founded in 1927 and was contested by those teams in higher leagues until recently, when only the top four were invited. There are two other Cup competitions designated as being Senior – the Wiltshire League Senior Cup and the Salisbury Hospital Cup.

There are 22 Junior Cup competitions and 4 League/6 Cup competitions at Youth status. There are 4 League and 19 Minor cup competitions for under-16s. In addition there are 3 Sunday Leagues and 9 Sunday Cup competitions, 2 Women's Leagues and 4 Women's Cup competitions.
