= Worcester Raiders F.C. =

English football club

Coordinates: 52.2241°N 2.2112°W

Worcester Raiders
- Full name: Worcester Raiders Football Club
- Founded: 2001
- Ground: Claines Lane, Worcester
- Chairman: Steve Harris
- Manager: Jordan Lewis
- League: Southern League Division One South
- 2025–26: Hellenic League Premier Division, 5th of 20 (promoted via play-offs)
Home colours

Worcester Raiders Football Club is a football club based in Worcester, Worcestershire, England. They are currently members of the Southern League Division One South and play at Claines Lane.

== History ==
The club were formed in 2001 as a youth club. In 2010 an adult team was formed and joined the Saturday division of the Worcester & District League. In their first season in the league they won the Nursing Cup, beating Malvern Town 2–1 in the final, and the Phipps Cup, beating Perrywood 5–1. In 2011–12 they won the league's Bayliss Cup, beating the University of Worcester 3–2 in the final. They retained the Bayliss Cup in 2012–13, and were league champions, resulting in promotion to Division Two of the West Midlands (Regional) League.

Worcester Raiders finished third in Division Two in their first season in the West Midlands (Regional) League, earning promotion to Division One. In 2018–19 they were Division One champions and were promoted to the Premier Division. At the end of the 2020–21 season the club were transferred to Division One of the Hellenic League. In the 2021–22 season, Worcester Raiders were runners-up in Division One, qualifying for the promotion play-offs. They defeated Pershore Town 3–0 in the semi-finals, but lost 3–0 to Hereford Pegasus in the final. However, the club were later promoted to the Premier Division after a vacancy was created by Walton Casuals folding.

== Ground ==
Worcester Raiders initially played at Claines Lane. In 2020 they started groundsharing at the Sixways Stadium of English Premiership rugby union club Worcester Warriors, with Worcester Warriors' co-owners Colin Goldring and Jason Whittingham becoming joint majority owners of Worcester Raiders in the process. In September 2022 the gates to the ground were locked as a result of Worcester Warriors' financial problems. However, Raiders reached an agreement with the Warriors' administrators to remain at Sixways. The club returned to Claines Lane in 2025.

== Honours ==
- West Midlands (Regional) League
  - Division One champions 2018–19
- Worcester & District League
  - Division One champions 2012–13
  - Bayliss Cup winners 2011–12, 2012–13
  - Nursing Cup winners 2010–11
  - Phipps Cup winners 2010–11

== Records ==
- Best FA Cup performance: First qualifying round, 2022–23, 2025–26
- Best FA Vase performance: Second qualifying round, 2021–22, 2022–23

== See also ==
- Worcester Raiders F.C. players
- Worcester Raiders F.C. managers
