= FC Bristol =

Association football club in England

Coordinates: 51°32′56.6″N 2°34′19.3″W

- Full name: FC Bristol
- Founded: 2008 (as Lebeq United)
- Dissolved: 2024
- Ground: Oaklands Park, Almondsbury
- 2023–24: Hellenic League Division One, 6th of 17
Home colours

FC Bristol was a football club based in Almondsbury, near Bristol, England. Affiliated to the Gloucestershire County FA, they were members of the Hellenic League Division One and play at Oaklands Park.

== History ==
Formed in 2008 as Lebeq United, the club joined the Bristol and Suburban League and worked their way up through the divisions before winning the Premier Division One title in 2015–16. They were subsequently promoted to the Gloucestershire County League, and were runners-up in their second season, before winning the title in 2018–19 despite having six points deducted.

They were promoted to Western League Division One for 2019–20, at Step 6 of the National League System.

In July 2022, Lebeq United changed their name to FC Bristol.

== Honours ==
- Gloucestershire County League
  - Champions 2018–19
- Bristol & Suburban League
  - Premier Division champions 2015–16
