= Chipping Sodbury Town F.C. =

Football club in Chipping Sodbury, England

Coordinates: 51°32′33.7344″N 2°23′41.2866″W

Chipping Sodbury Town
- Full name: Chipping Sodbury Town Football Club
- Nickname: The Sods
- Founded: 1885
- Ground: The Ridings, Chipping Sodbury
- Chairman: Richard Bisp
- Manager: James Mapstone
- League: Hellenic League Division One
- 2024–25: Hellenic League Division One, 11th of 17
Home colours

Chipping Sodbury Town Football Club is a football club based in Chipping Sodbury, South Gloucestershire, England. They are currently members of the Hellenic League Division One and play at the Ridings.

== History ==
Chipping Sodbury Football Club was established around 1885. They joined Division One of the North Bristol & District League in 1898, and finished bottom of the division in 1899–1900. The league was later renamed the Bristol & Suburban League, and after World War II the club were Division Two champions in 1948–49. They went on to win Division One the following season, and moved up to Division Two of the Western League in 1950. However, the club left after finishing bottom of the division in 1951–52. They subsequently returned to the Bristol & Suburban league, before folding in 1954.

The club was reformed in the late 1950s, joining the Dursley & Wotton League in 1959. They later moved up to the Bristol & District League. After finishing third in the league's Senior Division in 1990–91, the club were promoted to Division One of the Avon Premier Combination, which was renamed the Bristol Premier Combination in 1994. They were promoted to the Premier Division in the late 1990s, but relegated back to Division One in 2001–02. The club won Division One in 2005–06, earning promotion back to the Premier Division, and then adopted their current name. They went on to win the Premier Division in 2007–08, earning promotion to the Gloucestershire County League.

Despite finishing bottom of the Gloucestershire County League in their first season in the league, the club avoided relegation. Another last-place finish in 2011–12 also saw them avoid relegation and they went on to finish third in the league in 2014–15 and were promoted to Division One of the Western League. They won Division One at the first attempt, securing promotion to the Premier Division. At the end of the 2020–21 season the club were transferred to the Premier Division of the Hellenic League. They finished bottom of the Premier Division in 2022–23 and were relegated to Division One.

== Honours ==
- Western League
  - Division One champions 2015–16
- Bristol Premier Combination
  - Premier Division champions 2007–08
  - Division One champions 2005–06
  - Premier Cup winners 1992–93
- Bristol & Suburban League
  - Division One champions 1949–50
  - Division Two champions 1948–49

== Records ==
- Best FA Cup performance: First qualifying round, 2018–19
- Best FA Vase performance: First round, 2021–22, 2024–25
