= Sixways Stadium =

Sports venue in Worcester, England

- Sixways
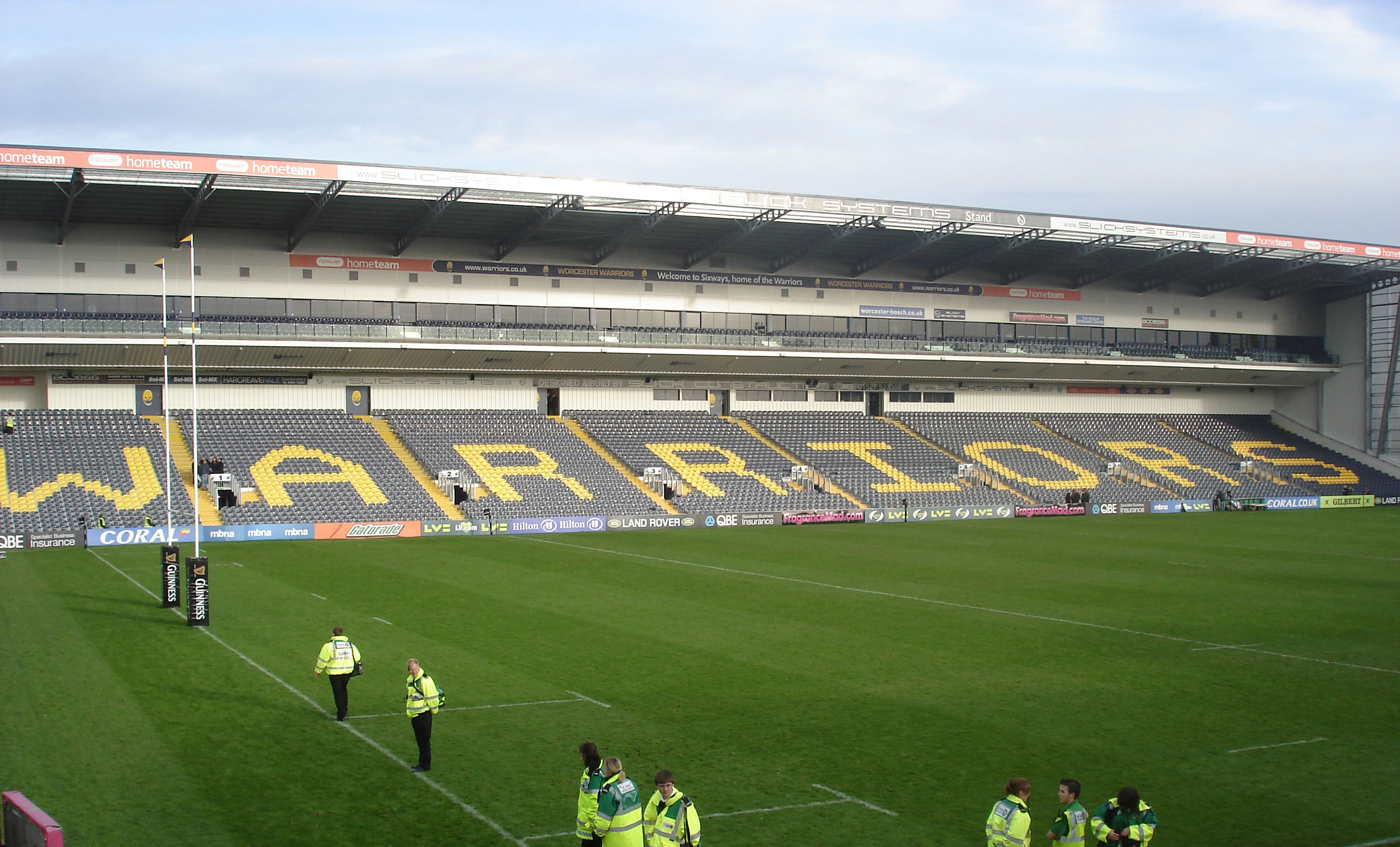
- The East Stand to the east of the stadium
- Interactive map of Sixways Stadium
- Location: Warriors Way, Worcester WR3 8ZE
- Coordinates: 52°12′56″N 2°09′45″W
- Capacity: 12,067
- Surface: Limonta Max S Turf

Construction
- Opened: 1998
- Renovated: 2008

Tenants
- Worcester Warriors (1998–2022 & 2025– ) Worcester Warriors Women (1993–2023); Worcester Raiders (2020–2025); Worcester City Women F.C (2023–); Worcester City (2025–)

Sixways Stadium is a stadium in Worcester, England. It is currently used for rugby union and association football matches and is the home stadium of Champ Rugby side Worcester Warriors and Southern League Premier Division Central football side Worcester City and West Midlands Regional Women’s Football League side Worcester City Women F.C. It was also previously home to Worcester Warriors Women.

Prior to their administration and suspension in 2022 Warriors competed in Premiership Rugby before reforming in Champ Rugby ahead of the 2025–26 season . The stadium is able to hold 12,067 with parking for 1,000 cars, Sixways has 60 modern meeting and event rooms . The ground opened in 1975 and is located off junction 6 of the M5 motorway, which splits into six directions, hence the name Sixways. The Stadium commenced building on the site of the old 3rd team pitch and club house after a lottery grant in 1998.

On 7 April 2016 it was announced that Sixways' pitch would be converted to the latest technology artificial grass ahead of the 2016–17 season. Sixways would become the third Premiership Rugby venue with an artificial pitch after Copthall stadium and Kingston Park but the first to feature organic infill rather than rubber crumb.

== The Cecil Duckworth Stand ==
The Cecil Duckworth Stand is the largest in the ground. The multimillion-pound development on the east side of the stadium complex includes The PitchView Restaurant, The Business Club, The Duckworth Suite, The Worcester Suite, The Hindlip Suite and many boxes which are utilised every day of the year. Below the stand is the Slick Systems Supporters bar area for fans as well as food outlets and programme booths. In 2025 the stand was renamed as ‘The Cecil Duckworth Stand’ after the previous owner of the Worcester Warriors.

The entrance to The Cecil Duckworth Stand is through the main glass fronted club reception which is also home to the Sixways Store and Warriors Ticket Office which are open throughout the week.

== West Stand ==
The West Stand is the most established stand at the home of the Warriors. The West Stand houses the Clubhouse Bar and a separate food counter serving hot snacks. In front of the bar is terracing from which the game came be watched.

The Sixways Premier Suites Upper and Lower are located to the south end of the stand and offer a bar area and dance floor with a live band after every game.

Above the Clubhouse Bar on the second floor is the International Bar which is full of rugby memorabilia past and present, with views onto the pitch. Opposite is the Hallmark Bar which hosts an exclusive bar and dining area open to West Stand Debenture holders.

The West Stand is also home to the indoor training centre, changing rooms and rugby department offices which become the main training area for the Warriors during the week.

== South Stand ==
Located behind the goalposts this stand hosts 30 hospitality boxes over two floors with spacious bar areas to the rear. The South Stand Terrace, in the middle of the stand, is a bar area that sells food and drink.

== North Stand ==
Plans have been approved to increase the North Stand at Sixways Stadium to make it the same size as the Slick Systems Stand in years to come.

== Finals ==
The stadium hosted the 2009–10 LV Cup final on 21 March 2010 between Northampton Saints and Gloucester. Northampton won 30–24.

Sixways hosted the 2011–12 LV Cup final on 18 March 2012 between Leicester Tigers and Northampton Saints. Leicester won 26–14.

The stadium also hosted the 2012–13 LV Cup final on 17 March 2013. Harlequins defeated Sale Sharks 32–14 in front of 8,100 spectators and gained a place in the 2013–14 Heineken Cup as a result.

The stadium has also hosted the Britbowl, the championship game of British American football twice, in 2010 and 2016. London Blitz played in both finals, beating Coventry Jets 34–20 in 2010 and losing to London Warriors 36–15 in 2016.
