= Corsham Town F.C. =

Association football club in England

Coordinates: 51°25′49.91″N 2°10′20.01″W

Corsham Town
- Full name: Corsham Town Football Club
- Nickname: Quarrymen
- Founded: 1884
- Ground: The SECURE Stadium, Corsham
- Capacity: 1,200 (112 seated)
- Chairman: Fran Harvey
- Manager: George Plank
- League: Hellenic League Premier Division
- 2025–26: Hellenic League Premier Division, 6th of 20
Home colours	Away colours

Corsham Town Football Club is a football club based in Corsham, Wiltshire, England. The first team plays in the Hellenic League Premier Division.

== History ==
Corsham Town was founded in 1884 and affiliated to the Football Association in 1893. The club were founder members of the Wiltshire League in 1894 and were its initial champions, taking the title on goal average after winning their final match 17–1 against Calne. They won the Wilts Junior Cup in the 1946–47 season. Four seasons later the club entered the FA Cup for the first time making it to the first qualifying round in its first attempt, they entered the competition for a further three seasons. In the 1960–61 season the club won its second honour winning the Wiltshire League Division two, fourteen years after their first honour.

In 1976 they became founding members of the Wiltshire Football League, when the Wiltshire Combination and Wiltshire Leagues were amalgamated, starting in Division 2. During their first Season in the new county league the club won the Wiltshire Senior Cup and were promoted to the top division in the league.

For many years afterwards, the club then spent time being relegated and promoted between the top two divisions, and not achieving anymore silverware, until Gary Lock became manager and began the road to success, winning the Addkey Senior Cup in 1995–96 . His was a short tenure, and Lock was followed by Peter Tripp who led the club to becoming champions for the first time in 1997–98, also winning the Addkey Senior Cup along with the Wilts Senior Cup. The club also entered the FA Vase competition in the 2001–02 season for the first time and, a season afterwards entered the FA Cup again after a gap of 49 years, since last playing in the competition in the 1950s.

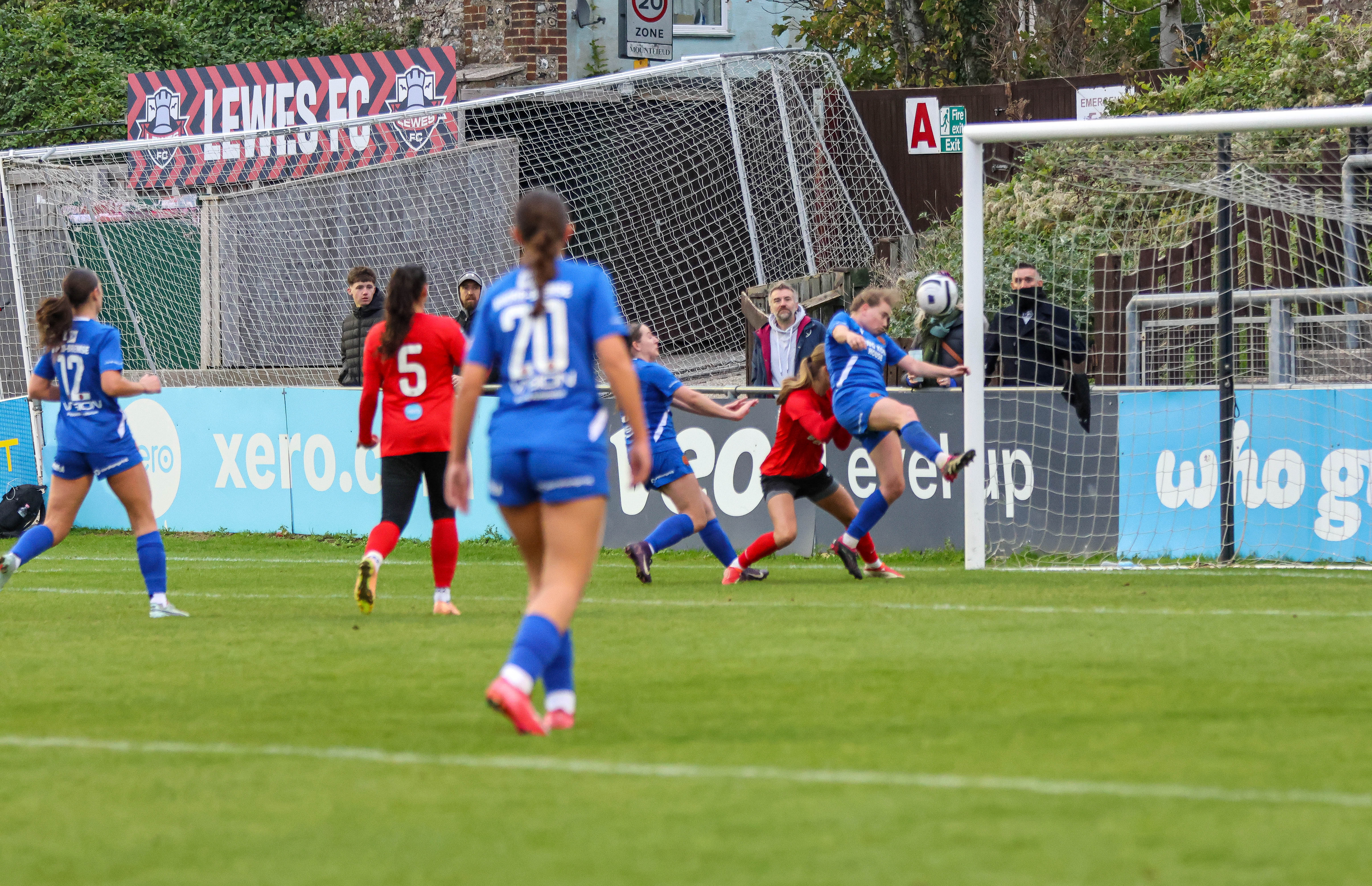
playing Lewes FC Women in 2025

After spending six years in Division One, they were promoted to the Premier Division in 2004 after finishing fifth in new manager Colin Bush's first season at the helm. That season also saw the ground improve under the chairmanship of Colin Hudd with floodlights being installed and a 112 spectator stand being built. They finished runners up to Bideford in their first two seasons in the Western League's top division and were crowned as champions for the 2006–07 season, winning the division by two points from Bridgwater Town. Bush decided to step down after four years at the helm, and former Wiltshire Under 18s manager Mel Gingell was appointed to the job of rebuilding the side, after many of the championship winning team decided to leave the Southbank for pastures new. In an impressive first season, Gingell's young charges finished fifth in the league, despite a lengthy touchline ban for the new manager. The club then remained in the Premier Division until the 2011–12 season where, upon finishing 18th, they were relegated back to Division One under new manager Trevor Rawlings. Rawlings led the club to a fourth-place finish in their first season back in the First Division, narrowly missing out on promotion back to the Premier Division at the first time of asking.

In 2021 Corsham was promoted to the Premier Division of the Hellenic League based on their results in the abandoned 2019–20 and 2020–21 seasons.

== Ground ==
Corsham Town play their home games at The SECURE Stadium, Lacock Road, Corsham, SN13 9HS.

== Honours ==
- Western League Premier Division :
  - Winners: 2006–07
  - Runners-Up: 2004–05, 2005–06
- Wiltshire County League Division 1 :
  - Winners: 1997–98
  - Runners-Up: 1996–97
- Wiltshire County League Division 2 :
  - Runners-Up: 1976–77, 1989–90, 1992–93
- Wiltshire League Division 2 :
  - Winners: 1960–61
- Wiltshire Senior Cup:
  - Winners: 1976–77, 1996–97, 2004–05, 2005–06, 2006–07
  - Runners-Up: 2003–04
- Western Football League Cup:
  - Winners (1): 2005–06
- Wiltshire Junior Cup:
  - Winners: 1946–47

== Records ==
- Highest League Position: First in Western League Premier Division 2006–07
- F.A Cup best Performance: Second qualifying round 2004–05, 2007–08
- F.A. Vase best performance: Semi-finals 2022–23
