= Wiltshire Football League =

Association football league in England

- Founded: 1976
- Number of clubs: 33
- Level on pyramid: Level 11 (Premier Division)
- Feeder to: Hellenic League; Wessex League; Western League
- Promotion to: Hellenic League Division One; Wessex League Division One; Western League Division One
- Relegation to: North Berks Football League; Swindon & District League; Trowbridge & District League
- Domestic cup: Fountain Trophies Senior KO Cup
- Current champions: Shrewton United (Premier); Fairford Town Reserves (Division one) (2025–26)
- Website: Official website

The Wiltshire Football League, also known as the Wiltshire League and the Wiltshire Senior League, is a football league in England which was formed by amalgamation in 1976. All clubs are affiliated to a County Football Association. The area covered by the competition is the county of Wiltshire and 15 miles beyond the county boundary. The league is at Level 11 (Step 7) of England's National League System pyramid, and operates a Premier Division, Division 1, two Ladies’ Divisions, an U18 Youth Floodlight Division and two Veterans (over 35's) divisions.

The league is sponsored by Corsham Print.

== History ==
The league was established in 1976 by the Wiltshire Football Association as a replacement for the Wiltshire Combination League and the amateur Wiltshire League.

Sponsorship by Corsham Print began in 2015–16. Starting in 2016–17, the Swindon & District League and the Trowbridge & District League became formal feeder leagues, with one club from each potentially promoted to the Wiltshire Senior League each season, and relegation in the other direction.

Wiltshire Senior Football League Limited, a private company limited by guarantee, was established in 2021.

== Member clubs 2026–27 ==
For the 2023–24 season, the league's Premier Division was increased from 16 to 18 clubs and Division One was expanded from seven clubs to 16.

Where a club is outside Wiltshire, their county is shown in brackets.

=== Premier Division ===
- Bemerton Heath Harlequins Reserves
- Bishops Cannings
- Bradford Town Reserves
- Devizes Town Reserves
- Down Ampney (Gloucestershire)
- Fairford Town Reserves
- Faringdon Town (Oxfordshire)
- Hungerford Town Development
- Larkhall Athletic Development (Somerset)
- Letcombe (Oxfordshire)
- Melksham Town Reserves
- Park United
- Pewsey Vale
- Purton Kingsdown
- Royal Wootton Bassett Town Development
- Shrewton United
- Trowbridge Town
- Wroughton

=== Division One ===
- Amesbury Town Development
- Calne Town Reserves
- East Hendred A.F.C.
- Faringdon Town Development
- Highworth Town Reserves
- Kintbury Rangers Development (Berkshire)
- Malmesbury Victoria Development
- Marlborough Town
- Old Town Athletic
- Pewsey Vale Development
- Purton Kingsdown Development
- Redhouse
- Shrivenham Development
- Stratton Juniors
- Wantage Town Reserves
- Westbury United Reserves

== History ==
The formation of the Wiltshire County Football League resulted from the amalgamation of the Wiltshire Combination and Wiltshire Leagues. The following Officers and Committee were elected at the inaugural meeting held in Devizes: J R Nunn (Chairman), W L Miles (Vice-chairman), E S M Ashman (Secretary), F E Jones (Assistant Secretary), C G Scott (Treasurer), P J Ackrill (Registration Secretary), and K J Mulraney (Referees' Appointments Secretary). There was a Management Committee of fourteen Vice-presidents.

The league was initially to consist of no more than 56 clubs.

=== 1976 league constitution ===
- Senior Division 1 – Amesbury, Malmesbury Victoria, Avon (Bradford), Park YC, Bemerton Athletic, Salisbury City Res, Bromham, Sanford, Calne Town, St Joseph's YC, Chippenham Town Res, Vickers (South Marston), Ferndale Athletic, Westbury Utd, Highworth Town, Wootton Bassett Town
- Senior Division 2 – Avebury, Pewsey Vale, Burbage Sports, Purton, Corsham Town, Rowde, Lawn (Swindon), Warminster Town, Ludgershall, West Lavington, Marlborough Town, Wroughton
- Junior Division (Section A) – Box Rovers, Sarsen Utd, Corsham Town Res, Sherston, Croft, Shrewton, Frogwell, Sutton and Seagry, Highworth Town Res, Trowbridge Youth, Laverstock and Ford, Walcot Boys Athletic, Park YC Res, West Lavington Res, Penhill YC, West Swindon
- Junior Division (Section B) – Amesbury Res, Malmesbury Victoria Res, Avon (Bradford) Res, Marlborough Town Res, Bemerton Athletic Res, Pewsey Vale Res, Bromham Res, Purton Res, Calne Town Res, Sanford Res, Devizes Town Res, St Joseph's YC Res, Ferndale Athletic Res, Vickers (South Marston) Res, Lawn (Swindon) Res, Wootton Bassett Town Res

=== 1990–91 season ===
The Cup Competitions had new sponsors and were renamed the Addkey Senior KO Cup and the Fountain Trophies Junior KO Cup.

=== 1991–92 season ===
The league extended its boundaries this season and changed its name to The Wiltshire Football League. This season saw the league enter into a Pyramid of Football Agreement with the Western and Hellenic Football Leagues.

=== 1994–95 season ===
A new logo was introduced, changing the design for the first time since the league was formed.

=== 1998–99 season ===
With the introduction of new Senior status standards by the Wiltshire County Football Association, an Intermediate status was introduced and the league amended its rules accordingly. Division 1 became the Premier Division, Division 2 the Intermediate Division, Division 3 became Junior Division 1 and Division 4 became Junior Division 2. The Intermediate Division was sponsored by Plaister Auto Services.

=== 2003–04 season ===
There were an insufficient number of clubs at Intermediate status this season, so the league reverted to two junior divisions. The league had new sponsors this season in Plaister Auto Services and changed their name accordingly.

=== 2014–15 season ===
There were an insufficient number of clubs at Intermediate status this season, so the league closed the Junior Division.

=== 2022–23 season ===
Division One was reintroduced, consisting of seven clubs.

== List of champions ==
Season	Division One	Division Two	Division Three	Division Four
1976–77	Park	Warminster Town	Walcot Boys Athletic	Devizes Town Reserves
1977–78	Park	Penhill YC	Shrewton	Melksham Town Reserves
1978–79	Park	Ferndale Athletic	Shrewton	Meadowcroft
1979–80	Amesbury	Calne Town	Sanford Reserves	Dorcan
1980–81	Park	St Joseph's	Shrewton	Durrington Sports
1981–82	Sutton United	Meadowcroft	Moredon EC	Calne Town Reserves
1982–83	Penhill	Purton	Avebury Reserves	Kington Langley
1983–84	Penhill	Willis	Penhill Reserves	Plessey Sports
1984–85	Park	Wootton Bassett Town	Plessey Sports	Corsham Town Reserves
1985–86	Purton	Ferndale Athletic	Calne Town Reserves	Walcot
1986–87	Bemerton Athletic	Oldacre	Purton Reserves	Old Manor Reserves
1987–88	Wootton Bassett Town	Marlborough Town	Aldebourne Park Reserves	Chiseldon
1988–89	Ferndale Athletic	Devizes Town Reserves	Walcot Athletic	Wroughton
1989–90	Pewsey Vale	Pinehurst	Walcot Athletic	Wootton Bassett Sports
1990–91	Amesbury Town	Wroughton	Sunray Badbury	Ramsbury
1991–92	Amesbury Town	Dorcan	Sunray Badbury	Plessey Semics
1992–93	Pewsey Vale	Marlborough Town	Salisbury Manor	Dorcan Reserves
1993–94	Melksham Town	Bradford Town	National Semi-Conductor	Ashton Keynes
1994–95	Aldbourne Ferndale	Melksham Town Reserves	Raychem Sports & Social	Shrewton United Reserves
1995–96	Pinehurst	Southbrook Walcot	Raychem Sports & Social	PRC Durrington
1996–97	Shrewton United	Raychem Sports & Social	Chisledon	Raychem Sports & Social Reserves
1997–98	Corsham Town	Melksham Town Reserves	Down Ampney	GPS Reserves
Season	Premier Division	Intermediate Division	Junior Division One	Junior Division Two
1998–99	Raychem Mowlem	Down Ampney	Cricklade Town Reserves	Westside United
1999–00	Malmesbury Victoria	Trowbridge Town	Malmesbury Victoria Reserves	Sherston
2000–01	Cricklade Town	Wanborough United	Ashton Keynes	Swindon Eagles
Season	Premier Division	Intermediate Division	Junior Division	
2001–02	Shrewton United	Stratton Crosslink Reserves	Wootton Bassett United	
2002–03	Shrewton United	Dunbar Westside	Cricklade Town Reserves	
Season	Premier Division	Junior Division One		
2003–04	Trowbridge Town	Trowbridge Town Reserves	Swindon Asians	
2004–05	Corsham Town	Down Ampney	Castle Combe	
2005–06	Corsham Town	Wroughton	Chiseldon Castrol	
2006–07	Corsham Town	AFC Castrol	Lower Stratton	
2007–08	Wroughton	Minety	KC	
2008–09	New College Swindon	Minety	Greenmeadow	
2009–10	New College Swindon	Minety	Wilton Town	

Season	Premier Division	Division One
2010–11	Corsham Town Reserves	FC Sanford
2011–12	FC Sanford	Box Rovers
2012–13	Wilts Calne Town	Madames
2013–14	Southbrook	Melksham Town Reserves
Season	Premier Division	
2014–15	Malmesbury Victoria	
2015–16	Trowbridge Town	
2016–17	Wroughton	
2017–18	Kintbury Rangers	
2018–19	Wroughton	
2019–20	Season abandoned, Corsham Town Reserves in the lead	
2020–21	Season abandoned, Pewsey Vale in the lead	
2021–22	Royal Wootton Bassett Town Development	
Season	Premier Division	Division One
2022–23	Trowbridge Town	Larkhall Athletic Development
2023–24	Amesbury Town	Park United
2024–25	Kintbury Rangers	Cricklade Town
Sources: Wiltshire League, Non-League Matters, FA Full Time
