= Pershore Town F.C. =

Association football club in England

Coordinates: 52°06′45.96″N 2°04′24.19″W

Pershore Town
- Full name: Pershore Town Football Club
- Nicknames: Town, The Plums
- Founded: 1988
- Ground: That Carpet Place Stadium; King George's Way; Pershore
- Capacity: 4,000
- Chairman: Jason Neville
- Manager: Adam Parker
- League: Hellenic League Premier Division
- 2025–26: Hellenic League Premier Division, 18th of 20
- Website: http://www.pershoretownfc.co.uk
Home colours	Away colours

Pershore Town Football Club (generally known simply as Pershore Town) are an English association football club based in Pershore, Worcestershire, England, and are members of the Hellenic League Premier Division.

== History ==
The club was established in 1988 by the merger of three clubs, Pershore United, Pershore Rec. Rovers and junior club Pershore Bullets. The new club joined the Midland Football Combination in 1989, initially in Division Two, where they were champions at the first attempt. The following season they were promoted again, this time to the Premier Division.

In the 1993–94 season, they were crowned Midland Combination Premier Division champions and also reached the final qualifying round for the FA Cup which saw them featured on the BBC before their 3–1 loss at home to Yeading.

After their title win, they were among the founder members of the newly formed Midland Football Alliance, where they spent six seasons before succumbing to relegation back to the Midland Combination Premier Division. In 1998, Pershore Town absorbed Worcester Athletico. For the 2019–20 season, the club applied to join the Hellenic Football League but were instead placed in the West Midlands (Regional) League. However, at the end of the 2020–21 season, they were transferred to Division One of the Hellenic League. The club were promoted to the Hellenic Premier Division as Champions in the 2022–23 season.

== Club records ==
- Best league performance: 1st in Hellenic Football League, 2022―23
- Best FA Cup performance: 4th qualifying round, 1993–94
- Best FA Vase performance: 3rd round proper, 1995–96
