= 2017–18 Southern Football League =

The 2017–18 season was the 115th in the history of the Southern League since its establishment in 1894. It was also the last to have a single Premier Division. From the 2014–15 season onwards, the Southern League is known as Evo-Stik League Southern, following a sponsorship deal with Evo-Stik.

The league constitution was announced in May 2017.

== Premier Division ==
Southern Football League Premier Division
- Season: 2017–18
- Champions: Hereford
- Promoted: Hereford; Slough Town
- Relegated: Dunstable Town
- Matches: 552
- Goals: 1,871 (3.39 per match)
- Top goalscorer: 38 goals - Brandon Goodship (Weymouth)
- Biggest home win: Chesham United 13 – 1 Merthyr Town, 18 November
- Biggest away win: Gosport Borough 0 – 8 Basingstoke Town, 28 August
- Highest scoring: Chesham United 13 – 1 Merthyr Town, 18 November
- Highest attendance: 4,556 – Hereford 4 – 1 Kettering Town, 21 April
- Lowest attendance: 67 – St Ives Town 2 – 6 Stratford Town, 17 April
- Total attendance: 256,331
- Average attendance: 464 (+35.6% to previous season)

At the end of the season a new division was to be created at step 3. Also, the number of clubs in step 3 divisions was reduced from 24 to 22. To make up the number of clubs at step 3 only one Premier Division club was to be relegated this season.

The Premier Division consisted of 24 clubs, including 18 clubs from the previous season, and six new clubs:

- Two clubs promoted from Division One Central:
  - Farnborough
  - Royston Town
- Two clubs promoted from Division One South & West:
  - Hereford
  - Tiverton Town
- Two clubs relegated from the National League South:
  - Bishop's Stortford
  - Gosport Borough

=== League table ===
Pos	Team	Pld	W	D	L	GF	GA	GD	Pts	Promotion, qualification or relegation
1	Hereford	46	36	5	5	111	33	+78	113	Promoted to the National League North
2	King's Lynn Town	46	30	10	6	99	39	+60	100	Qualified for the play-offs, then placed to Premier Division Central (Note: Four teams played for one spot and promotion to the National League North / South.)
3	Slough Town	46	30	9	7	111	49	+62	99	Qualified for the play-offs, then promoted to the National League South
4	Kettering Town	46	30	7	9	122	56	+66	97	Qualified for the play-offs, then placed to Premier Division Central
5	Weymouth	46	30	7	9	103	48	+55	97	Qualified for the play-offs, then placed to Premier Division South
6	Tiverton Town	46	24	6	16	78	69	+9	78	Placed to Premier Division South
7	Royston Town	46	24	5	17	84	65	+19	77	Placed to Premier Division Central
8	Chesham United	46	21	11	14	85	61	+24	74	Placed to Premier Division South
9	Banbury United	46	19	15	12	90	59	+31	72	Placed to Premier Division Central
10	Basingstoke Town	46	21	8	17	92	72	+20	71	Placed to Premier Division South
11	Hitchin Town	46	19	9	18	67	66	+1	66	Placed to Premier Division Central
12	St Neots Town	46	17	13	16	79	79	0	64	Placed to Premier Division Central
13	Frome Town	46	18	7	21	78	96	−18	61	Placed to Premier Division South
14	Redditch United	46	15	10	21	73	73	0	55	Placed to Premier Division Central
15	Stratford Town	46	15	10	21	68	81	−13	55	Placed to Premier Division Central
16	Biggleswade Town	46	14	11	21	52	63	−11	53	Placed to Premier Division Central
17	Merthyr Town	46	13	14	19	76	98	−22	53	Placed to Premier Division South
18	Bishop's Stortford	46	14	10	22	74	79	−5	52	Transferred to Isthmian League Premier Division
19	Dorchester Town	46	13	12	21	62	83	−21	51	Placed to Premier Division South
20	Farnborough	46	15	6	25	82	120	−38	51	Placed to Premier Division South
21	Kings Langley	46	8	14	24	63	98	−35	38	Placed to Premier Division South
22	St Ives Town	46	8	9	29	54	105	−51	33	Placed to Premier Division Central
23	Gosport Borough	46	5	5	36	41	142	−101	19 (Note: Gosport Borough were deducted one point for fielding an ineligible player in their draw against Biggleswade Town on 31 March.)	Placed to Premier Division South
24	Dunstable Town	46	4	5	37	27	137	−110	17	Relegated to Division One Central

Updated to match(es) played on 28 April 2018. Source: Southern League Website
Rules for classification: 1) Points; 2) Goal difference; 3) Number of goals scored; 4) Number of matches won; 5) Head-to-head results

=== Results table ===
Home \ Away	BAN	BAS	BIG	BST	CHE	DOR	DUN	FAR	FRO	GOS	HER	HIT	KET	KLT	KIL	MER	RED	ROY	SLO	STI	STN	STR	TIV	WEY
Banbury United		1–1	1–1	2–1	1–1	5–1	1–2	4–1	3–4	5–0	0–1	1–0	1–1	1–2	1–1	3–3	1–3	3–0	2–2	3–1	1–1	4–0	1–2	1–2
Basingstoke Town	3–1		2–0	3–2	5–0	1–1	2–0	4–3	1–3	3–0	3–1	1–0	3–2	1–2	4–3	2–0	3–0	0–0	1–4	3–2	1–0	2–1	6–2	3–3
Biggleswade Town	1–1	1–2		2–2	0–3	1–1	0–2	3–0	1–2	2–0	0–1	2–1	0–0	2–2	2–0	2–1	1–0	1–1	3–5	0–2	2–0	3–1	4–0	1–2
Bishop's Stortford	0–5	2–0	0–0		1–1	1–0	4–1	2–2	4–0	2–1	0–1	0–3	0–2	2–3	2–0	4–0	3–0	0–3	2–2	4–3	1–2	1–1	1–2	2–3
Chesham United	1–3	4–1	2–0	2–1		2–2	2–0	0–0	5–1	3–0	1–3	0–0	2–0	1–3	1–0	13–1	2–0	1–2	1–1	4–0	2–2	1–3	1–1	0–6
Dorchester Town	0–2	1–0	2–1	1–0	1–1		1–1	4–0	1–4	7–2	0–1	1–4	4–1	0–2	1–0	1–2	1–0	1–0	0–1	6–0	0–4	1–2	3–0	0–3
Dunstable Town	0–5	0–6	0–2	0–5	1–4	0–1		1–0	1–2	0–2	0–4	0–4	1–2	0–4	1–4	0–6	1–1	0–5	0–3	0–0	2–3	2–3	1–2	2–1
Farnborough	1–0	4–3	2–1	0–5	2–0	3–3	4–0		5–3	1–2	2–4	4–1	3–4	5–2	0–4	2–2	1–3	0–1	1–2	2–1	2–4	1–4	2–3	2–6
Frome Town	0–2	1–0	2–3	2–1	1–3	3–1	3–0	1–1		2–0	0–3	3–4	2–2	0–0	2–1	1–2	1–0	1–4	0–4	0–1	2–2	3–0	0–1	1–4
Gosport Borough	0–4	0–8	1–1	1–3	1–5	3–3	1–0	2–4	7–0		0–4	0–3	0–7	1–7	1–2	1–1	2–5	2–3	1–5	0–0	0–1	0–1	0–5	0–4
Hereford	3–0	4–1	1–0	2–0	3–0	4–1	2–0	0–1	1–0	5–1		5–0	4–1	0–2	3–0	1–1	5–2	2–0	0–1	4–0	1–0	5–2	1–0	2–0
Hitchin Town	0–3	2–1	0–1	1–0	0–0	0–0	1–0	1–3	5–1	2–1	0–3		0–0	0–4	6–0	2–0	1–0	1–0	0–1	2–2	2–2	4–0	1–2	3–1
Kettering Town	3–0	3–0	3–1	6–0	3–1	4–3	6–0	6–2	3–0	2–0	1–3	4–1		1–0	1–1	5–0	1–0	4–1	0–0	4–1	3–0	2–0	2–3	2–0
King's Lynn Town	1–1	2–1	3–0	2–1	0–1	3–0	5–0	3–1	0–0	2–0	3–2	2–0	2–1		3–2	0–0	3–1	4–0	1–0	1–1	1–1	4–1	2–0	1–1
Kings Langley	3–4	1–1	1–1	4–1	0–0	2–2	1–0	0–3	2–7	1–1	3–3	1–2	2–5	0–0		2–2	1–2	1–0	0–2	0–3	4–3	2–0	2–2	2–3
Merthyr Town	1–3	1–1	0–2	0–0	1–2	1–1	3–1	3–0	3–4	5–0	0–0	0–0	2–4	0–1	4–1		2–2	2–1	4–5	3–2	1–0	3–1	2–1	0–3
Redditch United	2–2	3–0	1–0	2–2	3–1	4–0	5–0	7–1	4–1	4–2	0–2	2–2	0–0	0–1	2–2	1–1		1–0	1–4	4–0	2–2	0–2	3–2	1–2
Royston Town	1–1	1–0	4–0	4–2	0–2	3–1	1–1	4–3	3–0	5–0	1–4	2–1	4–3	2–0	4–0	5–1	2–1		0–4	2–1	2–1	1–2	3–0	1–2
Slough Town	0–1	1–1	2–1	2–4	2–1	2–0	8–1	5–1	2–1	5–1	2–2	4–0	1–2	2–2	1–1	3–2	4–0	2–1		3–0	2–1	1–1	2–0	3–0
St Ives Town	2–2	2–2	1–2	0–1	0–2	1–2	2–1	2–4	2–2	1–0	0–2	1–3	3–4	1–3	1–1	2–3	1–0	1–3	1–4		1–1	2–6	1–2	1–2
St Neots Town	3–0	2–1	0–0	2–2	3–1	5–0	2–2	0–1	1–6	0–4	1–3	1–1	2–4	0–5	3–2	5–2	2–1	3–1	3–1	3–1		2–2	1–0	1–2
Stratford Town	2–3	0–1	1–0	3–1	1–3	2–0	5–1	2–2	1–2	2–0	1–2	1–2	0–4	1–5	3–1	2–2	0–0	1–1	0–1	3–0	1–1		1–2	0–0
Tiverton Town	0–0	3–2	3–1	2–1	1–2	0–0	7–1	2–0	2–2	2–0	2–2	3–1	0–3	1–0	3–2	3–1	1–0	1–2	3–0	2–3	1–2	2–1		2–1
Weymouth	1–1	3–2	2–0	1–1	1–0	2–2	2–0	6–0	0–2	5–0	0–2	3–0	3–1	3–1	2–0	3–2	5–0	3–0	1–0	0–1	3–1	1–1	2–0	

Updated to match(es) played on 28 April 2018. Source: The Evo-Stik Southern Football League
Legend: Blue = home team win; Yellow = draw; Red = away team win.

=== Play-offs ===
Semi-finals
2	King's Lynn Town	3
5	Weymouth	0
3	Slough Town	3
4	Kettering Town	1

Final
2	King's Lynn Town	1
3	Slough Town	2

Semi-finals

2 May 2018	King's Lynn Town	3–0	Weymouth	The Walks, King's Lynn
19:45 (UTC+01:00)	Norman 13'; Parker 15'; King 39'	Report		Attendance: 1,223

2 May 2018	Slough Town	3–1	Kettering Town	Arbour Park, Slough
19:45 (UTC+01:00)	Coles 13'; Dobson 52' (pen.); Dobson 71' (pen.)	Report	O'Connor 36'	Attendance: 1,246

Final

7 May 2018	King's Lynn Town	1–2	Slough Town	The Walks, King's Lynn
15:00 (UTC+01:00)	Hilliard 27'		Flood 44'; Williams 89'	Attendance: 2,842

=== Stadia and locations ===
Locations of the Premier Division clubs

Club	Stadium	Capacity
Banbury United	Spencer Stadium	2,000
Basingstoke Town	The Camrose	6,000
Biggleswade Town	Langford Road	3,000
Bishop's Stortford	Woodside Park	4,525
Chesham United	The Meadow	5,000
Dorchester Town	The Avenue Stadium	5,009
Dunstable Town	Creasey Park	3,200
Farnborough	Cherrywood Road	7,000
Frome Town	Badgers Hill	2,000
Gosport Borough	Privett Park	4,500
Hereford	Edgar Street	4,913
Hitchin Town	Top Field	4,000
Kettering Town	Latimer Park (groundshare with Burton Park Wanderers)	2,400
King's Lynn Town	The Walks	5,733
Kings Langley	Gaywood Park	1,000
Merthyr Town	Penydarren Park	10,000
Redditch United	The Valley	5,000
Royston Town	Garden Walk	5,000
Slough Town	Arbour Park	1,950
St Ives Town	Westwood Road	2,000
St Neots Town	New Rowley Park	3,500
Stratford Town	Knights Lane	1,400
Tiverton Town	Ladysmead	3,500
Weymouth	Bob Lucas Stadium	6,600

== Division One East ==
Southern Football League Division One East
- Season: 2017–18
- Champions: Beaconsfield Town
- Promoted: AFC Rushden & Diamonds; Beaconsfield Town; Hartley Wintney
- Relegated: Arlesey Town
- Matches: 462
- Goals: 1,492 (3.23 per match)
- Top goalscorer: 34 goals - Daniel West (Thame United)
- Biggest home win: Ashford Town 10 – 0 Fleet Town, 24 October
- Biggest away win: Arlesey Town 1 – 9 Hayes & Yeading United, 20 January
- Highest scoring: 10 goals (3 matches)

For this season, Division One Central was renamed Division One East.

At the end of the season a new division was to be created at step 3. To make up the number of clubs at step 3 two clubs from each step 4 division, one club with best points-per-game among the step 4 division clubs and six play-off winners were to be promoted this season. Also, a new division were to be added at step 4 within the Isthmian League, while the number of clubs in every step 4 division was decreased to 20. To make up the number of clubs only one club was to be relegated.

Division One East consisted of 22 clubs, including 16 clubs from the previous season Division One Central, and six new clubs:

- AFC Rushden & Diamonds, transferred from the Northern Premier League Division One South
- Cambridge City, relegated from the Premier Division
- Hartley Wintney, promoted from the Combined Counties League
- Hayes & Yeading United, relegated from the Premier Division
- Moneyfields, promoted from the Wessex League
- Thame United, promoted from the Hellenic League

For 2018–19, Division One East was renamed Division One Central.

=== League table ===
Pos	Team	Pld	W	D	L	GF	GA	GD	Pts	Promotion, qualification or relegation
1	Beaconsfield Town	42	29	5	8	99	46	+53	92	Promoted to Premier Division South
2	AFC Rushden & Diamonds	42	27	10	5	92	25	+67	91	Promoted to Premier Division Central
3	Hayes & Yeading United	42	26	5	11	103	49	+54	83	Qualified for the play-offs, then transferred to the Isthmian League South Central Division (Note: Four teams played for one spot and promotion to Level 7.)
4	Hartley Wintney	42	26	4	12	96	53	+43	82	Qualified for the play-offs, then promoted to Premier Division South
5	AFC Dunstable	42	23	10	9	80	37	+43	79	Qualified for the play-offs
6	Cambridge City	42	23	8	11	99	53	+46	77	Qualified for the play-offs
7	Kempston Rovers	42	21	10	11	80	68	+12	73	
8	Bedford Town	42	22	6	14	70	48	+22	72	
9	Chalfont St Peter	42	20	12	10	56	39	+17	72	Transferred to the Isthmian League South Central Division
10	Moneyfields	42	19	12	11	79	63	+16	69	Transferred to Division One South
11	Thame United	42	20	4	18	84	78	+6	64	
12	Ashford Town	42	16	8	18	81	68	+13	56	Transferred to the Isthmian League South Central Division
13	Aylesbury United	42	17	4	21	52	73	−21	52 (Note: Aylesbury United were deducted three points for fielding an ineligible player in their win over Ashford Town on 23 January.)	
14	Marlow	42	13	10	19	54	75	−21	49	Transferred to the Isthmian League South Central Division
15	Uxbridge	42	14	7	21	58	87	−29	49	Transferred to the Isthmian League South Central Division
16	Egham Town	42	13	9	20	54	88	−34	48	Transferred to the Isthmian League South Central Division
17	Northwood	42	10	11	21	54	71	−17	41	Transferred to the Isthmian League South Central Division
18	Hanwell Town	42	9	7	26	48	88	−40	34	Transferred to the Isthmian League South Central Division
19	Fleet Town	42	8	10	24	38	86	−48	34	Transferred to Division One South
20	Barton Rovers	42	8	9	25	39	86	−47	33	
21	Aylesbury	42	9	6	27	40	88	−48	33	
22	Arlesey Town	42	3	5	34	36	123	−87	14	Relegated to the Spartan South Midlands League

Updated to match(es) played on 1 May 2018. Source: Southern League Website
Rules for classification: 1) Points; 2) Goal difference; 3) Number of goals scored; 4) Number of matches won; 5) Head-to-head results

=== Results table ===
Home \ Away	AFD	RUS	ARL	ASH	AYB	AYL	BAR	BEA	BED	CAM	CHA	EGH	FLE	HAN	HAR	H&Y	KEM	MAR	MON	NOR	THA	UXB
AFC Dunstable		0–3	5–0	2–2	2–0	3–0	1–0	2–2	1–0	2–2	0–2	6–1	4–0	6–1	0–1	3–3	2–1	2–1	0–0	2–0	1–0	2–1
AFC Rushden & Diamonds	1–0		0–0	1–0	7–1	4–1	5–0	1–2	0–0	2–0	1–0	0–0	7–1	2–0	2–0	0–1	3–1	0–0	2–2	4–0	6–0	1–1
Arlesey Town	0–7	1–2		1–3	0–2	0–2	0–0	1–2	0–2	1–6	1–1	2–3	0–0	2–3	1–6	1–9	0–4	0–1	0–4	1–3	2–3	0–2
Ashford Town	1–3	0–2	3–2		2–0	0–1	1–0	0–2	2–2	1–2	1–1	2–3	10–0	1–4	0–1	4–0	7–1	4–2	2–1	2–2	1–1	4–1
Aylesbury	1–2	0–4	1–5	2–2		0–1	0–1	1–3	0–4	1–2	0–2	0–0	1–1	0–3	2–0	0–2	2–2	3–1	0–2	2–3	1–1	3–2
Aylesbury United	1–1	0–2	1–0	2–1	1–2		2–3	1–4	0–3	1–6	1–2	4–0	1–1	1–0	0–2	1–0	0–2	1–0	2–2	2–0	7–2	2–2
Barton Rovers	0–2	0–2	1–1	1–2	3–1	0–2		2–3	0–1	0–1	0–1	0–1	1–0	1–1	1–3	1–2	2–2	4–0	1–2	1–1	1–1	0–1
Beaconsfield Town	4–0	1–1	7–0	5–0	0–3	3–2	0–0		0–0	3–2	1–2	3–1	2–0	2–0	1–2	0–1	2–4	4–0	1–0	2–2	0–1	4–0
Bedford Town	0–2	0–1	2–0	1–0	4–1	3–1	6–0	0–1		1–4	2–0	2–1	2–0	1–0	1–1	0–3	5–1	3–2	3–1	0–0	1–0	0–2
Cambridge City	0–2	0–1	7–3	1–2	0–1	1–0	0–1	1–2	5–1		0–0	6–1	4–1	3–0	4–1	0–2	1–1	7–1	1–1	1–0	4–2	5–1
Chalfont St Peter	1–0	2–2	2–0	2–0	1–0	0–1	1–2	4–2	0–4	1–1		3–0	0–0	0–1	3–1	1–1	1–1	1–1	1–2	2–0	1–2	3–0
Egham Town	0–0	2–1	1–2	1–1	4–1	2–0	0–3	1–5	2–1	1–2	0–1		3–0	1–0	1–2	2–0	1–3	2–2	1–2	2–2	1–2	3–3
Fleet Town	2–2	0–4	0–2	1–2	2–0	0–1	1–0	0–2	0–1	1–2	1–1	3–0		0–0	0–3	0–4	2–2	2–0	1–4	1–0	4–2	6–0
Hanwell Town	0–2	0–1	2–1	2–1	2–3	1–3	4–1	1–5	0–5	2–2	2–3	0–1	2–0		2–4	1–4	1–2	0–0	3–3	1–3	0–2	0–2
Hartley Wintney	1–0	2–1	4–1	2–1	4–0	3–4	7–0	0–1	2–0	1–2	1–1	7–1	2–0	5–1		1–6	2–1	3–0	5–1	2–0	2–0	4–0
Hayes & Yeading United	0–2	1–0	2–1	1–2	1–1	4–0	5–0	0–2	4–0	3–1	1–2	6–1	3–0	2–2	3–1		3–0	3–0	2–2	4–2	4–2	4–0
Kempston Rovers	1–0	1–1	5–0	3–2	2–0	4–0	4–1	4–3	2–1	0–4	0–1	2–2	1–1	1–1	1–0	3–2		2–1	3–1	1–1	0–4	4–1
Marlow	1–0	2–4	1–0	1–1	1–0	0–1	2–2	0–1	2–2	3–3	1–1	4–2	1–2	3–1	3–0	3–1	1–2		3–0	1–0	3–1	1–1
Moneyfields	1–1	1–3	1–0	2–0	5–2	3–0	5–1	2–4	0–2	1–1	1–0	2–0	1–1	3–1	2–2	2–5	2–1	3–1		2–0	4–1	2–3
Northwood	2–2	1–1	3–1	1–7	0–1	3–0	1–1	2–3	1–2	2–3	0–2	0–1	2–1	2–0	3–1	2–0	3–0	1–2	1–1		1–3	0–1
Thame United	0–5	0–3	7–1	3–0	2–0	3–1	5–2	1–2	3–1	1–0	4–1	2–3	4–0	3–1	0–3	0–1	1–3	4–0	2–3	3–3		1–0
Uxbridge	0–1	1–4	3–2	2–4	2–1	1–0	6–1	1–3	3–1	1–2	0–2	1–1	3–2	1–2	2–2	3–0	0–2	1–2	0–0	2–1	1–5	

Updated to match(es) played on 1 May 2018. Source: The Evo-Stik Southern Football League
Legend: Blue = home team win; Yellow = draw; Red = away team win.

=== Play-offs ===
Semi-finals
3	Hayes & Yeading United	0
6	Cambridge City	1
4	Hartley Wintney	2
5	AFC Dunstable	0

Final
4	Hartley Wintney	1
6	Cambridge City	0

Semi-finals

2 May 2018	Hayes & Yeading United	0–1	Cambridge City	Beaconsfield Road, Hayes
19:45 (UTC+01:00)		Report		Attendance: 415

2 May 2018	Hartley Wintney	2–0	AFC Dunstable	The Memorial Playing Fields, Hartley Wintney
19:45 (UTC+01:00)		Report		Attendance: 310

Final

7 May 2018	Hartley Wintney	1–0	Cambridge City	The Memorial Playing Fields, Hartley Wintney
15:00 (UTC+01:00)		Report		Attendance: 710

=== Stadia and locations ===
Locations of Division One East clubs
Division One East clubs in Greater London and its environs

Club	Stadium	Capacity
AFC Dunstable	Creasey Park (groundshare with Dunstable Town)	3,500
AFC Kempston Rovers	Hillgrounds Leisure	2,000
AFC Rushden & Diamonds	Hayden Road	1,500
Arlesey Town	Hitchin Road	2,920
Ashford Town	Robert Parker Stadium	2,550
Aylesbury	Haywood Way	1,300
Aylesbury United	The Meadow	5,000
Barton Rovers	Sharpenhoe Road	4,000
Beaconsfield Town	Holloways Park	3,500
Bedford Town	The Eyrie	3,000
Cambridge City	Westwood Road (groundshare with St Ives Town)	2,000
Chalfont St Peter	Mill Meadow	1,500
Egham Town	The Runnymede Stadium	5,565
Fleet Town	Calthorpe Park	2,000
Hanwell Town	Reynolds Field	3,000
Hartley Wintney	The Memorial Playing Fields	2,000
Hayes & Yeading United	Beaconsfield Road	3,000
Marlow	Alfred Davis Memorial Ground	3,000
Moneyfields	Moneyfields Sports Ground	2,000
Northwood	Northwood Park	3,075
Thame United	Meadow View Park	2,000
Uxbridge	Honeycroft	3,770

== Division One West ==
Southern Football League Division One West
- Season: 2017–18
- Champions: Taunton Town
- Promoted: Salisbury; Swindon Supermarine; Taunton Town; Wimborne Town
- Relegated: Bishop's Cleeve; Shortwood United
- Matches: 462
- Goals: 1,635 (3.54 per match)
- Top goalscorer: 43 goals - Benjamin Whitehead (Cirencester Town) and Tobias Holmes (Wimborne Town)
- Biggest home win: Taunton Town 9 – 0 Slimbridge, 24 April and Cinderford Town 9 – 0 Slimbridge, 19 April
- Biggest away win: Shortwood United 0 – 8 Salisbury, 9 September
- Highest scoring: Salisbury 8 – 2 Cirencester Town, 19 September

For this season, Division One South & West was renamed Division One West.

At the end of the season a new division was to be created at step 3. To make up the number of clubs at step 3 two clubs from each step 4 division, one club with best points-per-game among the step 4 division clubs and six play-off winners were to be promoted this season. Also, a new division were to be added at step 4 within the Isthmian League, while the number of clubs in every step 4 division was decreased to 20. To make up the number of clubs only one club was to be relegated.

Division One West featured four new clubs:

- Bristol Manor Farm, promoted from the Western League
- Cinderford Town, relegated from the Premier Division
- Cirencester Town, relegated from the Premier Division
- Kidlington, transferred from Division One Central

For 2018–19, Division One West was renamed Division One South.

=== League table ===
Pos	Team	Pld	W	D	L	GF	GA	GD	Pts	Promotion, qualification or relegation
1	Taunton Town	42	31	10	1	107	41	+66	103	Promoted to Premier Division South
2	Salisbury	42	25	9	8	108	55	+53	84	Promoted to Premier Division South
3	Wimborne Town	42	23	8	11	104	57	+47	77 (Note: Wimborne Town were promoted after Shaw Lane from the Northern Premier League Premier Division folded.)	Qualified for the play-offs, then promoted to Premier Division South (Note: Four teams played for one spot and promotion to Level 7.)
4	Evesham United	42	23	7	12	73	53	+20	76	Qualified for the play-offs
5	Swindon Supermarine	42	21	11	10	86	54	+32	74	Qualified for the play-offs, then promoted to Premier Division South
6	Didcot Town	42	21	10	11	89	63	+26	73	Qualified for the play-offs, then transferred to Division One Central
7	Cirencester Town	42	22	7	13	93	74	+19	73	
8	Bideford	42	21	9	12	79	58	+21	72	
9	Bristol Manor Farm	42	20	9	13	83	61	+22	69	
10	AFC Totton	42	19	9	14	65	49	+16	66	
11	Winchester City	42	17	10	15	73	66	+7	61	
12	Kidlington	42	15	12	15	80	64	+16	57	Transferred to Division One Central
13	Cinderford Town	42	14	12	16	81	71	+10	54	
14	Yate Town	42	14	14	14	72	74	−2	53 (Note: Yate Town were deducted three points for fielding two ineligible players in their win over Taunton Town on 26 September.)	
15	Larkhall Athletic	42	13	6	23	66	78	−12	45	
16	Mangotsfield United	42	10	11	21	53	86	−33	41	
17	Shortwood United	42	10	10	22	63	124	−61	40	Resigned at the end of the season, then demoted to the Western League
18	North Leigh	42	10	8	24	53	84	−31	38	Transferred to Division One Central
19	Paulton Rovers	42	10	7	25	57	81	−24	37	
20	Slimbridge	42	9	8	25	54	130	−76	35	
21	Barnstaple Town	42	7	8	27	53	105	−52	29	
22	Bishop's Cleeve	42	8	3	31	43	107	−64	24 (Note: Bishop's Cleeve were deducted three points for fielding an ineligible player in their win over Kidlington on 24 March.)	Relegated to the Hellenic League

Updated to match(es) played on 2 May 2018. Source: Southern League Website
Rules for classification: 1) Points; 2) Goal difference; 3) Number of goals scored; 4) Number of matches won; 5) Head-to-head results

=== Results table ===
Home \ Away	TOT	BAR	BID	BIS	BMF	CIN	CIR	DID	EVE	KID	LAR	MAN	NOR	PAU	SAL	SHT	SLI	SWI	TAU	WIM	WCC	YAT
AFC Totton		3–1	2–3	6–0	3–1	1–1	2–1	2–1	1–1	1–3	2–0	4–0	2–1	0–3	1–3	1–2	1–2	3–1	0–4	1–1	1–0	5–0
Barnstaple Town	0–3		1–2	3–2	0–2	1–2	0–2	0–4	0–2	3–3	0–3	1–1	1–5	4–0	0–2	1–3	0–3	1–3	0–2	1–1	1–4	2–3
Bideford	2–1	1–1		1–0	3–1	2–2	3–0	1–0	1–3	0–4	4–1	3–3	2–0	2–1	2–2	2–2	3–1	0–1	0–1	1–2	2–0	1–2
Bishop's Cleeve	1–3	1–5	1–2		0–2	0–3	0–1	1–5	2–3	1–0	0–3	4–0	1–1	3–2	1–3	4–0	1–1	0–5	1–3	1–7	4–2	0–2
Bristol Manor Farm	2–3	5–1	1–0	6–0		4–2	2–2	3–3	1–5	1–0	2–1	3–1	1–0	3–1	2–3	3–3	3–0	1–1	1–1	4–1	4–1	1–1
Cinderford Town	1–0	1–3	3–4	4–0	2–0		2–3	7–1	1–3	0–2	3–1	4–3	1–1	3–4	1–1	3–4	9–0	1–1	2–3	1–1	2–2	0–0
Cirencester Town	3–0	3–1	2–1	3–1	1–1	5–4		1–2	0–1	3–2	1–2	5–1	3–1	2–1	2–3	6–1	4–0	4–2	0–2	1–2	1–0	4–4
Didcot Town	0–0	4–2	0–0	1–0	2–0	1–1	4–0		3–0	1–0	4–2	3–4	3–0	3–0	3–1	1–1	4–0	0–0	0–4	4–2	2–4	4–2
Evesham United	1–0	2–0	3–0	2–1	1–0	1–0	2–5	0–2		1–3	2–0	1–1	3–2	1–0	1–2	2–2	3–0	3–3	0–3	1–2	1–0	1–1
Kidlington	0–0	5–2	1–2	2–0	2–3	4–1	1–1	3–3	0–3		1–2	2–2	2–1	3–0	0–1	3–0	2–2	1–1	2–2	1–3	1–1	2–2
Larkhall Athletic	0–1	2–0	0–1	0–2	2–0	0–1	3–3	2–3	2–2	1–1		0–2	5–0	2–1	1–2	3–0	2–2	3–3	2–3	1–3	1–2	1–0
Mangotsfield United	1–1	0–3	1–1	2–0	2–1	1–1	1–1	2–0	0–2	2–5	3–1		1–3	1–0	0–5	3–2	1–2	0–3	0–1	1–2	1–1	1–3
North Leigh	0–1	5–0	4–3	3–1	2–5	0–3	1–2	0–2	0–2	0–5	1–1	1–0		5–3	2–1	1–2	1–1	0–3	1–1	1–1	1–2	1–4
Paulton Rovers	1–1	1–2	1–3	3–0	0–1	1–1	0–3	2–2	2–0	0–1	1–3	2–4	0–1		0–2	3–2	1–2	0–2	2–2	1–0	2–2	2–0
Salisbury	2–0	0–1	1–0	0–0	1–1	2–3	8–2	2–1	0–0	6–1	1–2	3–0	2–0	2–2		6–1	5–1	0–2	2–2	2–0	2–2	6–2
Shortwood United	1–3	3–3	0–6	2–3	2–2	2–1	0–3	3–3	0–4	0–5	1–0	1–0	2–1	2–3	0–8		2–2	3–1	1–2	0–5	2–4	1–1
Slimbridge	0–2	2–2	4–3	1–2	2–1	0–1	1–3	3–6	3–5	3–1	4–2	0–2	0–2	1–4	2–5	1–3		1–3	2–2	1–8	2–0	1–5
Swindon Supermarine	1–0	3–0	0–5	4–2	1–0	4–0	2–1	1–0	2–0	2–2	4–2	2–2	1–1	2–1	2–2	5–1	8–0		2–3	0–1	1–1	2–0
Taunton Town	2–1	3–0	1–1	4–0	2–1	1–0	2–1	3–1	1–0	3–2	5–2	2–1	1–0	3–0	4–1	3–3	9–0	1–0		3–3	4–1	1–4
Wimborne Town	1–1	5–2	2–2	3–1	1–3	0–1	5–1	0–1	3–4	1–0	1–3	3–1	5–0	4–1	4–2	5–2	5–0	3–0	1–1		3–0	4–2
Winchester City	1–1	1–1	2–3	2–1	1–2	2–0	1–2	2–0	2–0	0–1	3–1	3–0	2–0	1–1	4–5	5–1	3–0	3–2	0–5	1–0		4–1
Yate Town	0–1	3–3	0–1	2–0	1–3	2–2	2–2	2–2	2–1	3–1	3–1	1–1	3–3	0–4	0–1	3–0	1–1	2–0	0–2	2–0	1–1	

Updated to match(es) played on 2 May 2018. Source:
Legend: Blue = home team win; Yellow = draw; Red = away team win.

=== Play-offs ===
Semi-finals
3	Wimborne Town	2
6	Didcot Town	0
4	Evesham United	1 (4)
5	Swindon Supermarine	1 (5)

Final
3	Wimborne Town	0 (3)
5	Swindon Supermarine	0 (4)

Semi-finals

2 May 2018	Wimborne Town	2–0	Didcot Town	The Cuthbury, Wimborne
19:45 (UTC+01:00)		Report		Attendance: 618

2 May 2018	Evesham United	1–1 (a.e.t.) (4–5 p)	Swindon Supermarine	Jubilee Stadium, Evesham
19:45 (UTC+01:00)		Report		Attendance: 437

Final

7 May 2018	Wimborne Town	0–0 (a.e.t.) (3–4 p)	Swindon Supermarine	The Cuthbury, Wimborne
15:00 (UTC+01:00)		Report		Attendance: 1,272

=== Stadia and locations ===
Locations of Division One West clubs

Club	Stadium	Capacity
AFC Totton	Testwood Stadium	3,000
Barnstaple Town	Mill Road	5,000
Bideford	The Sports Ground	2,000
Bishops Cleeve	Kayte Lane	1,500
Bristol Manor Farm	The Creek	2,000
Cinderford Town	Causeway Ground	3,500
Cirencester Town	Corinium Stadium	4,500
Didcot Town	Loop Meadow	3,000
Evesham United	Jubilee Stadium	3,000
Kidlington	Yarnton Road	1,500
Larkhall Athletic	The Plain Ham Ground	1,000
Mangotsfield United	Cossham Street	2,500
North Leigh	Eynsham Hall Park Sports Ground	2,000
Paulton Rovers	Athletic Field	2,500
Salisbury	Raymond McEnhill Stadium	5,000
Shortwood United	Meadowbank Ground	2,000
Slimbridge	Thornhill Park	1,500
Swindon Supermarine	Hunts Copse Ground	3,000
Taunton Town	Wordsworth Drive	2,500
Wimborne Town	The Cuthbury	3,250
Winchester City	The City Ground	4,500
Yate Town	Lodge Road	2,000

== League Cup ==
2017–18 Southern League Cup
Tournament details
- Country: England; Wales
- Teams: 65

Final positions
- Champions: Hitchin Town
- Runners-up: Didcot Town

The 2017–18 Southern League Cup (billed as The BigFreeBet.com Challenge Cup) was the 80th edition of the Southern League Cup, the cup competition of the Southern Football League.

Hereford, Mangotsfield United, and North Leigh declined to participate. The defending champions, Hayes & Yeading United, were defeated in the semi-finals by Hitchin Town.

=== Preliminary round ===
Tie	Home team (tier)	Score	Away team (tier)	Att.
1	Northwood (E)	1–3	Egham Town (E)	

=== First round ===
Tie	Home team (tier)	Score	Away team (tier)	Att.
2	Kempston Rovers (E)	3–1	King's Lynn Town (P)	
3	Beaconsfield Town (E)	2–2	Slough Town (P)	
Slough Town advance 5–3 on penalties
4	Cambridge City (E)	6–2	St Ives Town (P)	
5	Dorchester Town (P)	1–2	Salisbury (W)	
6	Hitchin Town (P)	4–2	Bishop's Stortford (P)	
7	Paulton Rovers (W)	1–2	Frome Town (P)	
8	AFC Dunstable (E)	1–1	Dunstable Town (P)	
AFC Dunstable advance 3–1 on penalties
9	AFC Rushden & Diamonds (E)	1–0	St Neots Town (P)	
10	Arlesey Town (E)	0–1	Biggleswade Town (P)	
11	Barnstaple Town (W)	0–0	Tiverton Town (P)	
Barnstaple Town advance 3–2 on penalties
12	Barton Rovers (E)	0–3	Royston Town (P)	
13	Bedford Town (E)	2–4	Kettering Town (P)	
14	Bideford (W)	2–2	Taunton Town (W)	
Taunton Town advance 5–4 on penalties
15	Chalfont St Peter (E)	1–1	Egham Town (E)	
Egham Town advance 7–6 on penalties
16	Chesham United (P)	3–0	Aylesbury (E)	

Tie	Home team (tier)	Score	Away team (tier)	Att.
17	Cinderford Town (W)	3–2	Slimbridge (W)	
18	Cirencester Town (W)	1–2	Larkhall Athletic (W)	
19	Didcot Town (W)	2–2	Banbury United (P)	
Didcot Town advance 5–4 on penalties
20	Fleet Town (E)	2–6	Basingstoke Town (P)	
21	Gosport Borough (P)	2–2	Moneyfields (E)	
Moneyfields advance 4–3 on penalties
22	Hanwell Town (E)	2–1	Uxbridge (E)	
23	Hayes & Yeading United (E)	3–0	Ashford Town (E)	
24	Marlow (E)	4–2	Aylesbury United (E)	
25	Redditch United (P)	9–1	Bishop's Cleeve (W)	
26	Shortwood United (W)	7–2	Merthyr Town (P)	
27	Thame United (E)	0–4	Kings Langley (P)	
28	Weymouth (P)	3–0	Wimborne Town (W)	
29	Winchester City (W)	1–4	AFC Totton (W)	
30	Yate Town (W)	1–3	Bristol Manor Farm (W)	
31	Farnborough (P)	1–6	Hartley Wintney (E)	
32	Kidlington (W)	3–0	Swindon Supermarine (W)	
33	Evesham United (W)	4–7	Stratford Town (P)	

=== Second round ===
Tie	Home team (tier)	Score	Away team (tier)	Att.
34	Barnstaple Town (W)	2–4	Taunton Town (W)	
35	Biggleswade Town (P)	2–1	Cambridge City (E)	
36	Chesham United (P)	4–2	AFC Dunstable (E)	
37	Kings Langley (P)	2–4	Hitchin Town (P)	
38	Moneyfields (E)	1–4	Basingstoke Town (P)	
39	Redditch United (P)	3–0	Stratford Town (P)	
40	Royston Town (P)	6–1	Kempston Rovers (E)	
Royston Town expelled, Kempston Rovers reinstalled
41	Frome Town (P)	2–1	Bristol Manor Farm (W)	

Tie	Home team (tier)	Score	Away team (tier)	Att.
42	Kidlington (W)	1–1	Didcot Town (W)	
Didcot Town advance 3–2 on penalties
43	Hartley Wintney (E)	1–2	Marlow (E)	
44	AFC Rushden & Diamonds (E)	3–2	Kettering Town (P)	
45	Hanwell Town (E)	3–5	Egham Town (E)	
46	Hayes & Yeading United (E)	3–1	Slough Town (P)	
47	Shortwood United (W)	1–3	Cinderford Town (W)	
48	AFC Totton (W)	0–1	Weymouth (P)	
49	Larkhall Athletic (W)	4–3	Salisbury (W)	

=== Third round ===
Tie	Home team (tier)	Score	Away team (tier)	Att.
50	AFC Rushden & Diamonds (E)	0–0	Hitchin Town (P)	
Hitchin Town advance 4–3 on penalties
51	Basingstoke Town (P)	1–3	Marlow (E)	
52	Biggleswade Town (P)	0–2	Kempston Rovers (E)	
53	Cinderford Town (W)	1–4	Redditch United (P)	
54	Egham Town (E)	1–1	Hayes & Yeading United (E)	
Hayes & Yeading United advance 4–2 on penalties

Tie	Home team (tier)	Score	Away team (tier)	Att.
55	Weymouth (P)	0–1	Larkhall Athletic (W)	
56	Frome Town (P)	W.O.	Taunton Town (W)	
Taunton Town forfeited due to a lack of available team members
57	Didcot Town (W)	0–0	Chesham United (P)	
Didcot Town advance 5–4 on penalties

=== Quarter-finals ===
Tie	Home team (tier)	Score	Away team (tier)	Att.
58	Didcot Town (W)	3–0	Redditch United (P)	
59	Hitchin Town (P)	2–0	Kempston Rovers (E)	

Tie	Home team (tier)	Score	Away team (tier)	Att.
60	Hayes & Yeading United (E)	6–5	Marlow (E)	
61	Frome Town (P)	0–1	Larkhall Athletic (W)	

=== Semi-finals ===
Tie	Home team (tier)	Score	Away team (tier)	Att.
62	Hitchin Town (P)	1–1	Hayes & Yeading United (E)	
Hitchin Town advance 4–2 on penalties
63	Didcot Town (W)	0–0	Larkhall Athletic (W)	
Didcot Town advance 4–2 on penalties

=== Final ===
18 April	Hitchin Town (P)	1–0	Didcot Town (W)	Hitchin
	Vincent 10'			Stadium: Top Field; Attendance: 401

== See also ==
- Southern Football League
- 2017–18 Isthmian League
- 2017–18 Northern Premier League
