= 2016–17 Southern Football League =

The 2016–17 season was the 114th in the history of the Southern League, which is an English football competition featuring semi-professional and amateur clubs from the South West, South Central and Midlands of England and South Wales. From the 2014–15 season onwards, the Southern League is known as Evo-Stik League Southern, following a sponsorship deal with Evo-Stik.

The league constitution was announced on 12 May 2016.

== Premier Division ==
Southern Football League Premier Division
- Season: 2016–17
- Champions: Chippenham Town
- Promoted: Chippenham Town; Leamington
- Relegated: Cinderford Town; Hayes & Yeading United; Cirencester Town; Cambridge City
- Matches: 552
- Goals: 1,595 (2.89 per match)
- Top goalscorer: 27 goals - Andrew Sandell (Chippenham Town)
- Biggest home win: Frome Town 8 – 1 Redditch United, 14 January
- Biggest away win: St Ives Town 0 – 7 Kettering Town, 5 November
- Highest scoring: Frome Town 8 – 1 Redditch United, 14 January
- Highest attendance: 2,033 – Dorchester Town 1 – 1 Weymouth, 26 December
- Lowest attendance: 71 - Kings Langley 1 – 2 Redditch United, 27 August
- Total attendance: 188,596
- Average attendance: 342 (+13.9% to previous season)

On 12 May 2016 the league constitution was announced. Later, Cinderford Town, who were originally promoted to the Southern Football League Premier Division as champions of Division One South & West, initially declined promotion due to financial concerns. On 27 May it was confirmed that Cinderford Town would remain in Division One South & West. As a consequence, the team with the best record among those relegated at level 7 - Stamford - were reprieved from relegation. Corby Town, who were originally placed in the Premier Division, were transferred to the Southern Football League to take the vacated place.

On 14 June 2016, Evesham United, who had been transferred from the Southern League Division One South & West to the Northern Premier League First Division South due to Cinderford's refusal to accept promotion, had an appeal against the decision to transfer them leagues heard by the Football Association. On 15 June 2016, they were informed they were successful in their appeal, meaning they would stay in their original league. The knock on effect of this was Cinderford Town were forced to take promotion to the Southern Football League Premier Division. This meant that Corby Town were placed back in the Northern Premier League Premier Division for the 2016–17 season.

The Premier Division consisted of 24 clubs, including 18 clubs from the previous season and six new clubs:

- Two clubs promoted from Division One Central:
  - Kings Langley
  - St Ives Town
- Two clubs promoted from Division One South & West:
  - Banbury United
  - Cinderford Town
- Two clubs relegated from the National League South:
  - Basingstoke Town
  - Hayes & Yeading United

=== League table ===
Pos	Team	Pld	W	D	L	GF	GA	GD	Pts	Promotion, qualification or relegation
1	Chippenham Town	46	31	10	5	94	47	+47	103	Promoted to the National League South
2	Leamington	46	27	11	8	74	32	+42	92	Qualified for the play-offs, then promoted to the National League North
3	Merthyr Town	46	25	14	7	92	42	+50	89	Qualified for the play-offs (Note: Four teams play for one spot and promotion to the National League North / South)
4	Hitchin Town	46	24	14	8	79	45	+34	86	Qualified for the play-offs
5	Slough Town	46	26	7	13	84	56	+28	85	Qualified for the play-offs
6	Banbury United	46	24	8	14	67	40	+27	80	
7	Biggleswade Town	46	21	11	14	85	59	+26	74	
8	Frome Town	46	20	14	12	80	67	+13	74	
9	Kettering Town	46	21	10	15	84	66	+18	73	
10	Weymouth	46	16	18	12	79	58	+21	66	
11	Chesham United	46	18	10	18	67	62	+5	64	
12	Basingstoke Town	46	18	8	20	65	72	−7	62	
13	King's Lynn Town	46	14	18	14	60	69	−9	60	
14	Stratford Town	46	13	17	16	64	66	−2	56	
15	St Ives Town	46	15	11	20	49	70	−21	56	
16	Dunstable Town	46	16	6	24	46	65	−19	54	
17	Redditch United	46	13	11	22	54	75	−21	50	
18	Dorchester Town	46	12	12	22	52	80	−28	48	
19	St Neots Town	46	14	6	26	66	101	−35	48	
20	Kings Langley	46	11	14	21	57	72	−15	47	
21	Cambridge City	46	12	11	23	46	72	−26	47	Relegated to the Division One East
22	Cirencester Town	46	11	9	26	54	92	−38	42	Relegated to the Division One West
23	Hayes & Yeading United	46	10	11	25	48	81	−33	41	Relegated to the Division One East
24	Cinderford Town	46	8	3	35	49	106	−57	27	Relegated to the Division One West

Updated to match(es) played on 1 May 2017. Source: SFL official site
Rules for classification: 1) Points; 2) Goal difference; 3) Number of goals scored; 4) Number of matches won; 5) Head-to-head results

=== Play-offs ===
Semifinals
2	Leamington	1
5	Slough Town	0
3	Merthyr Town	1 (1)
4	Hitchin Town	1 (4)

Final
2	Leamington	2
4	Hitchin Town	1

Semi-finals

26 April 2017	Leamington	1–0	Slough Town	The New Windmill Ground
19:45 BST				Attendance: 1,032

26 April 2017	Merthyr Town	1–1 (a.e.t.) (1–4 p)	Hitchin Town	Penydarren Park
19:45 BST				Attendance: 1,453

Final

1 May 2017	Leamington	2–1 (a.e.t.)	Hitchin Town	The New Windmill Ground
15:00 BST				Attendance: 2,102

=== Results ===
Home \ Away	BAN	BAS	BIG	CAM	CHE	CHI	CIN	CIR	DOR	DUN	FRO	H&Y	HIT	KET	KLT	KIL	LEA	MER	RED	SLO	STI	STN	STR	WEY
Banbury United		0–1	1–1	2–0	1–0	2–1	4–0	2–1	1–2	0–1	1–2	5–0	1–1	1–2	4–0	3–0	1–0	1–1	0–1	1–0	1–0	2–1	2–1	1–1
Basingstoke Town	0–1		2–1	2–1	3–2	1–2	3–0	0–1	1–1	5–1	1–3	1–1	1–1	3–0	1–2	3–0	0–2	3–2	0–1	4–1	0–2	1–0	2–1	1–6
Biggleswade Town	2–1	0–0		2–1	2–2	2–2	5–0	6–0	3–0	2–2	4–1	6–0	1–3	2–2	2–0	0–4	2–0	2–5	2–0	3–0	3–1	2–0	1–2	1–3
Cambridge City	1–2	0–2	1–1		3–1	1–3	1–0	2–1	1–0	0–2	0–3	2–2	0–4	2–3	0–0	1–1	1–1	1–0	1–4	3–4	1–2	3–0	0–0	2–1
Chesham United	0–4	4–0	1–2	3–1		1–3	1–0	3–0	3–0	1–0	1–1	6–0	2–0	1–0	1–2	5–2	0–1	1–1	1–1	1–1	2–0	3–2	1–1	1–1
Chippenham Town	0–1	2–0	2–0	5–0	3–1		1–0	4–1	4–0	1–0	2–2	3–0	1–0	1–0	2–1	1–1	1–0	3–1	1–1	3–3	2–0	1–2	2–1	2–0
Cinderford Town	1–2	2–3	1–2	0–1	0–1	3–2		0–2	4–0	1–3	4–2	1–2	0–1	1–3	1–2	0–4	1–2	3–2	1–1	2–1	0–1	5–2	2–1	2–2
Cirencester Town	1–4	2–3	1–0	0–3	1–2	3–3	3–2		4–1	2–0	1–4	1–2	0–0	1–6	1–1	0–1	1–2	0–2	2–1	1–3	1–2	2–1	1–2	3–0
Dorchester Town	0–1	1–1	2–1	0–2	3–2	1–3	2–0	2–2		2–0	3–0	2–1	2–2	0–2	1–1	1–0	2–2	1–2	0–0	0–4	1–1	1–0	2–2	1–1
Dunstable Town	1–0	1–3	0–2	2–1	0–0	1–2	2–0	1–1	2–1		0–2	0–2	2–1	2–3	0–0	1–2	0–2	0–1	1–0	0–1	4–1	1–0	2–0	1–1
Frome Town	1–2	1–1	2–0	2–0	2–0	0–1	3–2	3–2	0–4	1–0		2–1	1–1	3–3	1–3	0–0	0–0	2–2	8–1	1–0	2–2	1–1	3–1	2–0
Hayes & Yeading United	0–1	2–3	0–0	0–0	1–0	1–2	5–0	1–1	1–2	0–1	1–3		2–0	1–2	0–1	0–0	0–1	1–6	2–1	2–3	1–0	2–0	1–2	0–0
Hitchin Town	3–1	1–0	1–1	1–0	1–1	1–3	4–3	2–1	0–1	2–0	2–2	3–0		0–0	5–0	2–0	0–0	1–1	4–2	2–3	4–1	4–1	1–0	1–1
Kettering Town	2–2	2–1	3–1	0–0	1–2	1–2	2–0	3–1	1–0	1–3	4–1	1–1	0–0		1–1	1–0	0–2	1–3	1–2	3–0	1–1	2–2	0–3	3–1
King's Lynn Town	1–0	2–1	1–2	1–1	3–1	4–0	3–0	1–1	3–3	0–1	1–1	2–2	1–2	1–2		1–1	0–0	1–1	2–1	5–2	2–1	1–2	2–0	1–6
Kings Langley	0–1	2–0	4–5	2–0	1–2	1–1	0–1	1–0	2–0	0–1	2–2	1–0	1–2	1–2	2–2		0–2	2–2	1–2	2–3	2–1	2–3	1–3	1–1
Leamington	1–0	3–1	1–1	1–0	2–0	1–1	6–0	3–1	5–0	5–0	0–1	2–0	1–2	3–0	3–0	0–0		1–0	2–1	0–6	2–0	2–0	1–1	1–1
Merthyr Town	1–0	4–0	1–0	5–0	1–0	2–2	2–0	3–0	2–0	4–3	1–2	4–0	2–2	2–0	1–1	5–0	1–1		2–0	1–1	2–0	3–0	1–1	2–2
Redditch United	0–0	2–2	0–2	1–2	3–1	0–2	2–2	4–1	4–2	1–0	2–1	2–1	1–2	1–3	1–1	0–0	0–2	0–1		0–4	0–2	1–4	1–1	2–1
Slough Town	2–0	3–2	3–0	1–0	1–2	0–1	4–1	0–2	2–1	1–0	1–2	2–1	0–1	3–2	3–0	2–2	2–0	1–0	1–1		3–0	2–0	0–0	3–0
St Ives Town	1–1	0–1	0–1	0–0	0–2	2–3	1–0	1–1	1–0	3–1	1–1	1–1	0–3	0–7	2–0	2–1	0–5	0–0	2–1	2–0		2–1	1–1	1–2
St Neots Town	1–4	2–1	0–5	0–3	4–1	3–3	3–1	1–1	3–2	2–0	3–2	1–5	1–2	1–5	5–2	5–2	0–1	2–3	1–0	1–1	0–4		1–1	0–4
Stratford Town	2–0	1–1	1–0	3–3	1–1	0–1	4–2	0–1	1–1	2–0	3–0	0–0	3–2	4–1	1–1	2–2	0–2	0–3	2–4	1–2	2–3	5–2		0–5
Weymouth	2–2	3–0	2–2	2–0	2–0	1–4	3–0	4–0	2–1	3–3	2–1	2–2	0–2	3–2	0–0	1–1	4–0	0–1	1–0	0–1	1–1	0–2	1–1	

Updated to match(es) played on 22 April 2017. Source:
Legend: Blue = home team win; Yellow = draw; Red = away team win.

=== Stadia and locations ===
Locations of the Premier Division teams

Team	Stadium	Capacity
Banbury United	Spencer Stadium	2,000
Basingstoke Town	The Camrose	6,000
Biggleswade Town	The Carlsberg Stadium	3,000
Chesham United	The Meadow	5,000
Chippenham Town	Hardenhuish Park	2,815
Cinderford Town	Causeway Ground	3,500
Cirencester Town	Corinium Stadium	4,500
Dorchester Town	The Avenue Stadium	5,009
Dunstable Town	Creasey Park	3,200
Frome Town	Badgers Hill	2,000
Hayes & Yeading United	Beaconsfield Road	
Hitchin Town	Top Field	4,000
Kettering Town	Latimer Park (groundshare with Burton Park Wanderers)	2,400
King's Lynn Town	The Walks	5,733
Kings Langley	CRY Community Stadium	1,963
Leamington	New Windmill Ground	3,000
Merthyr Town	Penydarren Park	10,000
Redditch United	The Valley	5,000
Slough Town	Arbour Park	1,950
St Ives Town	Westwood Road	2,000
St Neots Town	New Rowley Park	3,500
Stratford Town	DCS Stadium	1,400
Weymouth	Bob Lucas Stadium	6,600

== Division One Central ==
Southern Football League Division One Central
- Season: 2016–17
- Champions: Royston Town
- Promoted: Royston Town; Farnborough
- Relegated: Histon; Petersfield Town
- Matches: 462
- Goals: 1,552 (3.36 per match)
- Top goalscorer: 30 goals - Jermaine Hall (AFC Dunstable)
- Biggest home win: Barton Rovers 8 – 0 Petersfield Town, 25 March
- Biggest away win: Petersfield Town 0 – 7 AFC Dunstable, 1 April
- Highest scoring: Egham Town 6 – 4 Uxbridge, 11 February
- Highest attendance: 551 – Royston Town 5 – 2 Aylesbury United, 15 April
- Lowest attendance: 41 – AFC Dunstable 3 – 1 Petersfield Town, 10 December
- Total attendance: 54,740
- Average attendance: 118 (-18.6% to previous season)

On 12 May 2016 the league constitution was announced. Three Division One Central clubs were moved to the parallel divisions: AFC Rushden & Diamonds were transferred to Northern Premier League Division One South, Godalming Town to Isthmian League Division One South and Ware to Isthmian League Division One North.

Division One Central consisted of 22 clubs, including 15 clubs from previous season and seven new clubs:

- AFC Dunstable, promoted from the Spartan South Midlands League
- AFC Kempston Rovers, promoted from the United Counties League
- Ashford Town, promoted from the Combined Counties League
- Farnborough, demoted from the Isthmian League Premier Division
- Histon, relegated from the Premier Division
- Kidlington, promoted from the Hellenic League
- Marlow, transferred from Division One South & West

=== League table ===
Pos	Team	Pld	W	D	L	GF	GA	GD	Pts	Promotion, qualification or relegation
1	Royston Town	42	32	6	4	121	48	+73	102	Promoted to the Premier Division
2	Farnborough	42	28	6	8	96	51	+45	90	Qualified for play-offs, then promoted to the Premier Division (Note: Four teams play for one spot and promotion to the Premier Division.)
3	Barton Rovers	42	23	8	11	91	66	+25	77	Qualified for the play-offs
4	Marlow	42	23	8	11	65	43	+22	77	Qualified for the play-offs
5	Egham Town	42	20	14	8	79	51	+28	74	Qualified for the play-offs
6	AFC Kempston Rovers	42	21	10	11	82	61	+21	73	
7	AFC Dunstable	42	21	8	13	85	53	+32	71	
8	Bedford Town	42	18	13	11	76	58	+18	67	
9	Potters Bar Town	42	16	14	12	71	61	+10	62	Transferred to the Isthmian League North Division
10	Ashford Town	42	17	8	17	73	71	+2	59	
11	Hanwell Town	42	16	10	16	64	67	−3	57 (Note: Hanwell Town were deducted one point for fielding an ineligible player.)	
12	Kidlington	42	18	5	19	70	79	−9	56 (Note: Kidlington were deducted three points for fielding a suspended player.)	Transferred to the West Division
13	Aylesbury United	42	16	7	19	58	68	−10	55	
14	Fleet Town	42	13	11	18	72	81	−9	50	
15	Arlesey Town	42	14	8	20	55	69	−14	50	
16	Beaconsfield SYCOB	42	13	9	20	81	85	−4	48	
17	Uxbridge	42	13	8	21	67	80	−13	47	
18	Chalfont St Peter	42	14	5	23	49	77	−28	47	
19	Aylesbury	42	12	8	22	54	75	−21	44	
20	Northwood	42	9	12	21	57	88	−31	39	
21	Histon	42	9	7	26	54	93	−39	34	Relegated to the Eastern Counties League
22	Petersfield Town	42	2	3	37	32	127	−95	9	Relegated to the Wessex League

Source: SFL official site
Rules for classification: 1) Points; 2) Goal difference; 3) Number of goals scored; 4) Number of matches won; 5) Head-to-head results

=== Play-offs ===
Semifinals
2	Farnborough	4
5	Egham Town	0
3	Barton Rovers	2
4	Marlow	0

Final
Farnborough	2
Barton Rovers	0

Semi-finals

26 April 2017	Farnborough	4–0	Egham Town	Cherrywood Road
19:45 BST				Attendance: 523

26 April 2017	Barton Rovers	2–0	Marlow	Sharpenhoe Road
19:45 BST				Attendance: 319

Final

1 May 2017	Farnborough	2–0	Barton Rovers	Cherrywood Road
15:00 BST				Attendance: 1,084

=== Results ===
Home \ Away	AFD	KEM	ARL	ASH	AYB	AYL	BAR	BEA	BED	CHA	EGH	FAR	FLE	HAN	HIS	KID	MAR	NOR	PET	POT	ROY	UXB
AFC Dunstable		1–2	1–2	4–1	2–0	2–0	3–3	1–0	2–2	4–0	1–2	1–3	2–0	0–1	4–0	2–2	2–2	3–1	3–1	3–1	0–1	1–2
Kempston Rovers	2–1		1–1	2–0	2–1	2–3	0–2	0–2	1–2	1–0	2–1	0–0	3–1	3–2	4–1	2–1	1–2	2–2	4–0	1–1	1–2	2–1
Arlesey Town	1–0	1–2		0–3	0–2	3–3	1–2	2–0	0–2	0–1	1–1	0–1	1–0	1–2	2–1	0–1	0–4	3–0	6–1	1–1	5–4	0–3
Ashford Town	2–3	3–1	2–1		1–0	1–1	6–3	1–2	1–1	2–3	1–1	1–0	3–4	1–3	1–2	5–1	3–1	0–2	1–0	0–3	1–4	2–0
Aylesbury	2–2	0–3	2–3	2–2		0–1	1–4	3–2	0–1	1–3	1–0	3–2	5–0	0–1	2–1	0–1	1–0	1–1	1–2	0–0	0–6	2–2
Aylesbury United	0–5	0–2	0–0	1–2	3–0		0–1	1–3	2–1	2–3	1–0	0–2	3–1	0–3	1–0	2–1	0–2	2–1	1–1	1–3	0–1	3–1
Barton Rovers	1–1	3–2	1–0	1–1	3–3	3–2		3–1	1–1	2–1	1–1	0–1	1–2	4–0	2–6	4–2	2–1	5–1	8–0	1–1	0–4	4–0
Beaconsfield Town	0–1	1–1	3–0	1–2	1–4	1–2	2–1		1–5	5–1	1–2	0–4	4–4	3–0	2–2	6–0	2–2	0–0	3–2	3–4	4–6	1–2
Bedford Town	2–1	0–1	1–1	2–2	3–2	3–2	1–1	4–1		3–2	1–1	2–1	1–1	2–2	5–2	0–2	3–0	0–1	4–1	1–1	0–1	3–3
Chalfont St Peter	1–1	0–3	2–3	0–0	2–2	3–2	0–2	1–0	2–3		0–0	0–2	1–0	0–2	2–0	0–2	1–3	0–2	4–1	0–4	0–4	2–0
Egham Town	3–4	6–3	2–1	3–1	3–1	0–5	2–0	4–1	1–0	2–0		1–1	2–0	2–0	2–0	3–0	1–2	1–1	3–0	1–1	1–1	6–4
Farnborough	2–1	3–2	3–3	2–1	1–0	1–0	4–0	6–1	3–2	3–1	4–0		4–3	2–3	2–1	3–0	0–3	2–1	2–0	2–0	3–3	2–2
Fleet Town	1–4	0–3	1–1	3–0	2–3	2–1	0–1	2–1	1–1	3–2	2–2	1–2		1–0	1–1	6–1	0–1	7–0	2–0	4–4	1–1	0–3
Hanwell Town	2–4	1–1	3–0	2–2	2–1	0–2	3–5	1–1	3–2	3–5	0–0	1–4	3–2		1–1	2–1	1–3	2–0	4–1	1–1	4–1	1–2
Histon	2–1	1–2	0–2	1–4	1–1	1–2	1–2	2–3	1–2	0–0	0–2	0–5	4–5	0–0		1–4	1–2	2–2	2–1	1–2	1–2	3–2
Kidlington	3–0	1–0	2–0	1–2	2–3	3–4	3–1	0–5	1–1	1–2	2–2	0–3	3–1	0–3	1–2		3–0	2–1	3–1	1–2	2–1	4–2
Marlow	0–1	1–1	3–0	1–0	1–0	3–0	1–2	0–0	3–1	1–0	1–2	1–0	0–0	1–0	0–2	2–1		2–1	2–2	0–0	0–2	1–1
Northwood	1–1	4–4	0–3	1–3	0–2	1–1	2–0	3–3	3–2	0–1	2–2	2–4	1–1	1–1	6–0	2–4	0–2		4–0	3–2	0–4	1–2
Petersfield Town	0–7	0–3	2–3	0–2	0–1	0–1	0–3	0–6	2–3	0–2	0–5	3–2	2–2	0–1	3–4	2–4	0–2	1–2		1–2	0–1	0–1
Potters Bar Town	1–2	2–3	3–1	3–2	3–1	0–0	2–0	1–1	0–2	2–1	0–3	2–2	1–2	1–1	2–0	0–3	1–4	4–0	3–1		1–3	2–3
Royston Town	1–0	4–4	3–0	5–3	5–0	5–2	3–6	4–1	1–0	4–0	3–2	5–0	2–0	2–0	2–0	1–1	4–2	2–1	6–0	0–0		5–2
Uxbridge	1–2	3–3	0–2	0–2	1–0	1–1	0–2	1–3	0–1	2–0	1–1	1–3	2–3	3–0	2–3	0–0	1–2	5–0	4–1	1–4	0–2	

Updated to match(es) played on 22 April 2017. Source: SFL Division One Central results grid
Legend: Blue = home team win; Yellow = draw; Red = away team win.

=== Stadia and locations ===
Locations of Division One Central teams
Greater London Division One Central teams
Division One Central Buckinghamshire teams

Team	Stadium	Capacity
AFC Dunstable	Creasey Park (groundshare with Dunstable Town)	3,500
Arlesey Town	Hitchin Road	2,920
Ashford Town	Robert Parker Stadium	2,550
Aylesbury	Haywood Way	1,300
Aylesbury United	The ASM Stadium (groundshare with Thame United)	2,000
Barton Rovers	Sharpenhoe Road	4,000
Beaconsfield SYCOB	Holloways Park	3,500
Bedford Town	The Eyrie	3,000
Chalfont St Peter	Mill Meadow	1,500
Egham Town	The Runnymede Stadium	5,565
Farnborough	Cherrywood Road	7,000
Fleet Town	Calthorpe Park	2,000
Hanwell Town	Reynolds Field	3,000
Histon	Bridge Road	4,300
Kempston Rovers	Hillgrounds Leisure	2,000
Kidlington	Yarnton Road	1,500
Marlow	Alfred Davis Memorial Ground	3,000
Northwood	Northwood Park	3,075
Petersfield Town	The Love Lane Stadium	3,000
Potters Bar Town	Parkfield	2,000
Royston Town	Garden Walk	5,000
Uxbridge	Honeycroft	3,770

== Division One South & West ==
Southern Football League Division One South & West
- Season: 2016–17
- Champions: Hereford
- Promoted: Hereford; Tiverton Town
- Relegated: Bridgwater Town; Wantage Town
- Matches: 462
- Goals: 1,533 (3.32 per match)
- Top goalscorer: 39 goals - Thomas Wright (Salisbury)
- Biggest home win: Taunton Town 10 – 2 Larkhall Athletic, 17 January
- Biggest away win: Wantage Town 0 – 9 Taunton Town, 17 December
- Highest scoring: Taunton Town 10 – 2 Larkhall Athletic, 17 January
- Highest attendance: 4,406 – Hereford 2 – 1 Evesham United, 2 January
- Lowest attendance: 0 – Didcot Town 1 – 2 Hereford, 11 April
- Total attendance: 157,895
- Average attendance: 341 (+117.2% to previous season)

On 12 May 2016 the league constitution was announced. One Division One South & West club were moved to the parallel division: Marlow were transferred to Division One Central. Later, Cinderford Town, who were originally promoted to the Premier Division as champions of Division One South & West, declined promotion due to financial concerns. On 27 May it was confirmed that Cinderford Town would remain in Division One South & West. As a consequence, Evesham United were transferred to the Northern Premier League Division One South to create a place for Cinderford Town.

On 14 June 2016, Evesham United, who had been transferred from the Southern League Division One South & West to the Northern Premier League First Division South due to Cinderford's refusal to accept promotion, had an appeal against the decision to transfer them leagues heard by the Football Association. On 15 June 2016, they were informed they were successful in their appeal, meaning they would stay in their original league. The knock on effect of this was Cinderford Town were forced to take promotion to the Southern Football League Premier Division.

Thus, Division One South & West featured five new clubs:

- Barnstaple Town, promoted from the Western League
- Bideford, relegated from the Premier Division
- Hereford, promoted from the Midland League
- Paulton Rovers, relegated from the Premier Division
- Salisbury, promoted from the Wessex League

=== League table ===
Pos	Team	Pld	W	D	L	GF	GA	GD	Pts	Promotion, qualification or relegation
1	Hereford	42	33	8	1	108	32	+76	107	Promoted to the Premier Division
2	Salisbury	42	29	2	11	118	52	+66	89	Qualified for play-offs
3	Tiverton Town	42	27	7	8	92	50	+42	88	Qualified for play-offs then promoted to the Premier Division (Note: Four teams play for one spot and promotion to the Premier Division)
4	Taunton Town	42	27	7	8	114	42	+72	85 (Note: Taunton Town were deducted three points for fielding an ineligible player in their win over Shortwood United on 6 August 2016.)	Qualified for play-offs
5	Evesham United	42	24	8	10	88	50	+38	80	Qualified for play-offs
6	Swindon Supermarine	42	21	9	12	85	57	+28	72	
7	North Leigh	42	22	9	11	84	65	+19	71 (Note: North Leigh were deducted four points for fielding ineligible players)	
8	Mangotsfield United	42	21	7	14	73	69	+4	70	
9	Shortwood United	42	19	5	18	65	77	−12	62	
10	Bideford	42	15	12	15	61	58	+3	57	
11	Wimborne Town	42	17	6	19	67	68	−1	57	
12	Didcot Town	42	14	12	16	70	71	−1	54	
13	Larkhall Athletic	42	13	14	15	69	69	0	53	
14	Winchester City	42	16	5	21	62	70	−8	53	
15	Paulton Rovers	42	15	6	21	62	69	−7	51	
16	Bishop's Cleeve	42	14	8	20	66	86	−20	50	
17	Barnstaple Town	42	13	6	23	52	68	−16	45	
18	Yate Town	42	12	8	22	49	77	−28	44	
19	AFC Totton	42	10	9	23	49	86	−37	39	
20	Slimbridge	42	10	7	25	47	90	−43	37	
21	Wantage Town	42	4	9	29	29	110	−81	21	Relegated to the Hellenic League
22	Bridgwater Town	42	2	4	36	23	117	−94	10	Relegated to the Western League

Source: SFL official site
Rules for classification: 1) Points; 2) Goal difference; 3) Number of goals scored; 4) Number of matches won; 5) Head-to-head results

=== Play-offs ===
Semifinals
2	Salisbury	2
5	Evesham United	1
3	Tiverton Town	3
4	Taunton Town	1

Final
Salisbury	0
Tiverton Town	2

Semi-finals

26 April 2017	Salisbury	2-1 AET	Evesham United	Ray Mac
19:45 BST				Attendance: 1,395

26 April 2017	Tiverton Town	3–1	Taunton Town	Ladysmead
19:45 BST	Landricombe 49', 87'; Bath 80'		Rogers 90' (pen.)	Attendance: 934

Final

1 May 2017	Salisbury	0–2	Tiverton Town	Ray Mac
15:00 BST				Attendance: 2,247

=== Results ===
Home \ Away	TOT	BAR	BID	BIS	BRI	DID	EVE	HER	LAR	MAN	NOR	PAU	SAL	SHT	SLI	SWI	TAU	TIV	WAN	WIM	WCC	YAT
AFC Totton		1–1	3–3	4–0	2–1	2–1	2–4	1–2	1–6	0–1	0–3	1–0	0–4	2–0	3–1	1–2	1–3	1–3	2–2	1–6	1–3	1–1
Barnstaple Town	2–1		0–1	0–2	5–0	2–1	1–2	0–2	4–3	1–1	3–1	1–0	1–4	0–1	3–1	0–1	0–1	0–4	1–1	1–0	1–3	1–1
Bideford	0–0	2–1		2–1	2–0	2–2	1–1	0–0	1–1	0–1	0–2	1–1	0–1	1–3	1–0	4–0	2–4	0–3	3–1	2–0	1–2	2–0
Bishop's Cleeve	3–2	1–1	3–3		3–0	1–1	0–2	0–4	0–1	2–2	1–2	1–4	0–5	4–1	0–0	1–4	1–5	1–1	2–1	4–0	1–0	1–2
Bridgwater Town	0–2	0–3	1–4	1–3		1–2	0–5	0–4	0–4	1–3	0–1	0–5	1–3	1–2	0–0	0–5	1–5	1–0	2–3	2–2	0–1	1–2
Didcot Town	3–2	1–0	4–2	2–2	4–0		1–2	1–2	0–0	0–2	1–1	1–0	0–1	1–2	1–0	1–5	2–3	3–3	3–1	2–0	4–0	1–2
Evesham United	0–0	1–0	2–0	4–2	1–0	2–2		0–2	5–1	1–0	1–1	2–2	3–2	1–2	1–2	1–1	2–0	1–4	5–1	2–0	3–1	3–1
Hereford	5–0	2–2	2–1	4–0	6–0	2–2	2–1		2–1	3–2	4–1	2–1	3–1	2–0	3–0	2–0	1–2	2–1	3–2	2–2	4–0	4–1
Larkhall Athletic	0–0	0–1	0–1	0–4	2–2	0–1	1–2	2–2		3–0	3–1	3–2	1–5	0–2	2–0	3–1	3–0	0–1	1–1	1–0	1–2	1–1
Mangotsfield United	3–0	3–2	2–1	3–3	6–0	2–3	1–5	0–1	1–1		1–0	2–1	1–3	1–5	3–0	1–1	0–4	1–2	0–0	2–1	3–3	3–1
North Leigh	2–3	4–2	2–1	1–0	1–0	2–2	1–4	3–3	2–2	2–3		1–0	3–2	2–2	3–1	2–1	1–0	2–3	4–1	1–1	2–0	2–1
Paulton Rovers	2–2	4–3	2–1	2–0	1–0	2–0	0–3	1–3	2–2	0–2	0–3		0–3	3–1	1–3	0–0	2–1	2–5	5–1	0–1	2–0	1–1
Salisbury	2–0	5–0	4–4	4–1	7–0	3–2	1–0	0–4	5–0	2–1	1–2	3–1		1–0	3–0	2–2	5–2	1–2	7–0	5–2	3–1	4–0
Shortwood United	2–1	1–0	1–2	1–3	1–1	3–3	2–0	0–3	0–5	0–1	2–5	1–3	0–3		4–4	1–0	0–3	1–0	7–1	1–3	2–1	2–2
Slimbridge	2–0	0–1	2–0	0–1	1–2	2–3	1–5	0–3	1–5	0–3	0–2	2–0	2–1	1–2		1–1	0–7	5–2	2–2	1–1	5–3	3–1
Swindon Supermarine	1–0	4–2	4–1	2–4	3–1	1–3	1–3	0–3	0–0	5–0	3–3	0–1	1–6	4–0	2–0		2–1	2–2	5–0	1–0	0–2	3–1
Taunton Town	5–0	0–1	0–0	4–2	1–0	3–0	2–1	1–1	10–2	6–1	2–2	4–1	3–1	3–0	0–0	0–0		2–0	3–0	2–1	3–1	2–0
Tiverton Town	3–2	2–1	1–1	4–2	2–0	3–1	2–1	1–1	1–1	3–2	4–1	3–1	2–0	1–2	2–1	2–3	1–1		2–0	4–3	1–0	4–0
Wantage Town	0–0	2–1	0–2	0–2	1–0	1–1	1–1	0–1	1–4	1–2	0–4	0–3	0–1	0–2	2–0	0–5	0–9	0–3		0–1	0–1	0–2
Wimborne Town	3–0	3–0	0–4	4–1	2–0	1–1	1–3	2–3	2–1	1–2	3–2	3–1	0–1	1–2	3–1	1–5	2–1	1–0	4–1		2–2	0–3
Winchester City	0–1	0–3	0–0	1–2	4–1	3–1	4–1	0–2	0–0	0–2	1–2	3–2	4–2	4–3	7–0	0–2	1–1	0–4	3–0	0–1		1–0
Yate Town	1–3	1–0	1–2	2–1	3–2	3–2	1–1	0–2	2–2	1–3	3–2	0–1	3–1	0–1	1–2	1–4	1–5	0–1	1–1	0–3	1–0	

Updated to match(es) played on 22 April 2017. Source: SFL Division One South & West results grid
Legend: Blue = home team win; Yellow = draw; Red = away team win.

=== Stadia and locations ===
Locations of Division One South & West teams

Team	Stadium	Capacity
AFC Totton	Testwood Stadium	3,000
Barnstaple Town	Mill Road	5,000
Bideford	The Sports Ground	2,000
Bishops Cleeve	Kayte Lane	1,500
Bridgwater Town	Fairfax Park	2,500
Didcot Town	Draycott Engineering Loop Meadow Stadium	3,000
Evesham United	Spiers and Hartwell Jubilee Stadium	3,000
Hereford	Edgar Street	4,913
Larkhall Athletic	The Plain Ham Ground	1,000
Mangotsfield United	Cossham Street	2,500
North Leigh	Eynsham Hall Park Sports Ground	2,000
Paulton Rovers	Athletic Field	2,500
Salisbury	Raymond McEnhill Stadium	5,000
Shortwood United	Meadowbank Ground	2,000
Slimbridge	Thornhill Park	1,500
Swindon Supermarine	Hunts Copse Ground	3,000
Taunton Town	The Viridor Stadium	2,500
Tiverton Town	Ladysmead	3,500
Wantage Town	Alfredian Park	1,500
Wimborne Town	The Cuthbury	3,250
Winchester City	The City Ground	4,500
Yate Town	Lodge Road	2,000

== League Cup ==
2016–17 Southern League Cup
Tournament details
- Country: England; Wales
- Teams: 68

Final positions
- Champions: Hayes & Yeading United
- Runners-up: St Ives Town

The 2016–17 Southern League Cup (billed as The League Challenge Cup) was the 79th edition of the Southern League Cup, the cup competition of the Southern Football League.

=== 1st round ===
4 October 2016	AFC Dunstable	0–1	Aylesbury	Creasey Park, Dunstable
19:45 BST (UTC+01)			Montgomery 94'	Attendance: 50

4 October 2016	AFC Totton	2–3	Winchester City	Testwood Stadium, Totton
19:45 BST (UTC+01)	Watts 64'; Gosney 85'		Jenkinson 32', 57'; Wilson 88'	Attendance: 157

12 October 2016	Aylesbury United	0–0 (5–3 p)	Wantage Town	Meadow View Park, Thame
19:45 BST (UTC+01)				Attendance: 51

4 October 2016	Banbury United	1–1 (4–1 p)	Cirencester Town	Spencer Stadium, Banbury
19:45 BST (UTC+01)	Gunn 78'		Bennett 50'	Attendance: 177

4 October 2016	Barnstaple Town	1–1 (4–1 p)	Tiverton Town	Mill Road, Barnstaple
19:45 BST (UTC+01)	Pearse 71'		Landricombe 41'	Attendance: 187

4 October 2016	Barton Rovers	4–0	Dunstable Town	Sharpenhoe Road, Barton–le–Clay
19:45 BST (UTC+01)	Roache 45'; Draycott 89'; Draycott 89'; Draycott 89'			Attendance: 76

4 October 2016	Bedford Town	2–0	Kempston Rovers	The Eyrie, Cardington, Bedford
19:45 BST (UTC+01)	Roache 45'; Draycott 89'			Attendance: 167

3 October 2016	Bideford	4–0	Taunton Town	The Sports Ground, Bideford
19:45 BST (UTC+01)	Western 55'; Tucker 57', 62'; Barker 92'			Attendance: 145

4 October 2016	Biggleswade Town	3–2	Arlesey Town	Carlsberg Stadium, Biggleswade
19:45 BST (UTC+01)	Lucan 42'; Marsh 53' (pen.); Bailey 67'		Rhiney 76', 94'	Attendance: 82

4 October 2016	Bishop's Cleeve	1–0	Slimbridge	Kayte Lane, Bishop's Cleeve
19:45 BST (UTC+01)	Baldwin 67'			Attendance: 62

4 October 2016	Bridgwater Town	1–3	Paulton Rovers	Fairfax Park, Bridgwater
19:45 BST (UTC+01)	Horsey 56'		Gould 16'; Legge 45'; Gibbons 65'	Attendance: 119

3 October 2016	Cambridge City	1–1 (1–4 p)	Histon	ProEdge Westwood Road, St Ives
19:45 BST (UTC+01)	Adewunmi 80'		Watson 27'	Attendance: 145

4 October 2016	Fleet Town	3–0 (4–3 p)	Farnborough	Calthorpe Park, Fleet
19:45 BST (UTC+01)	Scott 1'; Watts 34'; Cox 90'			Attendance: 99

4 October 2016	Hayes & Yeading United	1–1 (4–3 p)	Hanwell Town	SkyEx Community Stadium, Hayes, Hillingdon
19:45 BST (UTC+01)	Kearney 61'		Chandiram 65' (pen.)	Attendance: 49

5 October 2016	Kidlington	3–1	Swindon Supermarine	The Plain Ham Ground, Larkhall, Bath
19:45 BST (UTC+01)	Coyle 5'; Jenkinson 64', 66'		Thompson 21'	Attendance: 78

4 October 2016	Kings Langley	1–2	Chalfont St Peter	Gaywood Park, Kings Langley
19:45 BST (UTC+01)	Toomey 33'		Kirby 18'; Tomkins 28'	Attendance: 40

5 October 2016	Larkhall Athletic	0–0 (5–6 p)	Frome Town	The Plain Ham Ground, Larkhall, Bath
19:45 BST (UTC+01)			Montgomery 94'	Attendance: 61

4 October 2016	Leamington	4–1	Evesham United	New Windmill Ground (The Phillips 66 Community Stadium),[2] Whitnash
19:45 BST (UTC+01)	George 16'; Rowe 47'; Baker–Richardson 56'; James 79'		Kennedy 19'	Attendance: 218

4 October 2016	Merthyr Town	0–0 (3–4 p)	Cinderford Town	Penydarren Park, Merthyr Tydfil
19:45 BST (UTC+01)				Attendance: 210

4 October 2016	North Leigh	3–3 (4–2 p)	Didcot Town	Eynsham Hall Park Sports Ground, North Leigh
19:45 BST (UTC+01)	Woodley 27'; Woodley 43'; Murphy 74'		Carnell 65'; Whitehead 86', 92'	Attendance: 58

4 October 2016	Northwood	2–2 (4–2 p)	Beaconsfield SYCOB	Northwood Park, Chestnut Avenue, Northwood
19:45 BST (UTC+01)	Burgess 27'; Ehui 55'		Dillon 54'; Campbell 56'	Attendance: 68

4 October 2016	Petersfield Town	2–3	Basingstoke Town	The Love Lane Stadium, Petersfield
19:45 BST (UTC+01)	Coker 5'; Simmonds 68' (pen.)		Hallahan 18'; Francis 54'; Brown 69'	Attendance: 107

11 October 2016	Potters Bar Town	2–3	Chesham United	Parkfield
19:45 BST (UTC+01)	Lyons 18'; Steele–Dadzie 55'		Chendlik 1', 33', 95'	Attendance: 71

4 October 2016	Redditch United	3–4	Stratford Town	The Valley, Redditch
19:45 BST (UTC+01)	Hales 35'; McDermott 45'; Thompson 46'		Brooks 26'; Angus 62'; Westwood 77'; Ellicott 88'	Attendance: 159

4 October 2016	Royston Town	1–0	Hitchin Town	The Crows, The Town
19:45 BST (UTC+01)	Castiglione 45'			Attendance: 141

4 October 2016	Salisbury	10–0	Dorchester Town	The Raymond McEnhill Stadium, Salisbury
19:45 BST (UTC+01)	Moone 19', 25'; Bennett 30', 45', 75', 78'; Mehew 34', 43' (pen.), 45'; Brockway 70'			Attendance: 437

4 October 2016	Shortwood United	3–1	Yate Town	Meadowbank Ground, Nailsworth
19:45 BST (UTC+01)	Humphreys 16'; Bennett 46', 55'		Harvey 77'	Attendance: 71

4 October 2016	Slough Town	9–2	Ashford Town	Arbour Park, Slough
19:45 BST (UTC+01)	Putnam 7', 20', 81'; Moone 8', 34'; Dunn 15'; Togwell 45'; Hollis 70'; Raju 72' (pen.)		Herbet 4'; English 61'	Attendance: 314

4 October 2016	St Ives Town	0–0 (6–5 p)	King's Lynn Town	ProEdge Westwood Road, St Ives
19:45 BST (UTC+01)				Attendance: 137

4 October 2016	St Neots Town	4–0	Kettering Town	Rowley Park, St Neots
19:45 BST (UTC+01)	Ward 22'; Rogers 27', 68' (pen.); Mulready 40'; Wood 71'; Hawkins 78'			Attendance: 123

11 October 2016	Uxbridge	0–2	Egham Town	Honeycroft, West Drayton
19:45 BST (UTC+01)			Chendlik 61', 82'	Attendance: 49

4 October 2016	Weymouth	4–0	Wimborne Town	Bob Lucas Stadium
19:45 BST (UTC+01)	Lowes 19'; Lowes 38', 86', 90'			Attendance: 141

=== 2nd round ===
13 December 2016	Aylesbury	3–2	St Neots Town	Haywood Way, Aylesbury
19:45 BST (UTC+01)	Deacon 45'; Stevens 54'; Bamford 56'		Hyem 10'; Rogers 45'	Attendance: 50

8 November 2016	Barton Rovers	2–2 (7–6 p)	Chesham United	Sharpenhoe Road, Barton-le-Clay
19:45 BST (UTC+01)	Carter 43' (pen.), 70'		Gorniak 27', 44'

8 November 2016	Basingstoke Town	4–1	Fleet Town	The Camrose, Basingstoke
19:45 BST (UTC+01)	Gater 4'; Whittingham 40' (pen.); Deadfield 63'; Jarvis 83'		Toye 60'	Attendance: 127

8 November 2016	Bideford	1–4	Barnstaple Town	The Sports Ground, Bideford
19:45 BST (UTC+01)	Stephens 48'		Turner 40'; Heeney 44'; Copp 50', 90'	Attendance: 320

8 November 2016	Biggleswade Town	3–2	Histon	Carlsberg Stadium, Biggleswade
19:45 BST (UTC+01)	Lucan 1'; Iwediuno 44'; Effiong 70'		Gardner 24' (pen.); Gwynne 84' (pen.)	Attendance: 80

8 November 2016	Bishop's Cleeve	4–1	Cinderford Town	Kayte Lane, Bishop's Cleeve
19:45 BST (UTC+01)	Stoddart 5'; Davidge 16'; Watts 19'; Crowe 59'		Hands 73'	Attendance: 72

22 November 2016	Hayes & Yeading United	3–0	Egham Town	SkyEx Community Stadium, Hayes, Hillingdon
19:45 BST (UTC+01)	Carter 33'; Weiss 45'; Hutchinson 53'			Attendance: 46

9 November 2016	Kidlington	1–2	Aylesbury United	Yarnton Road, Kidlington
19:45 BST (UTC+01)	Coyle 32' (pen.)		Cameron 10'; Collins 81'	Attendance: 55

8 November 2016	North Leigh	0–2	Banbury United	Eynsham Hall Park Sports Ground, North Leigh
19:45 BST (UTC+01)			Browne 35'; Jeacock 82'	Attendance: 65

23 November 2016	Northwood	1–0	Slough Town	Northwood Park, Chestnut Avenue, Northwood
19:45 BST (UTC+01)	Ehui 46'			Attendance: 76

15 November 2016	Paulton Rovers	1–1 (4–3 p)	Weymouth	Athletic Field, Winterfield Road, Paulton
19:45 BST (UTC+01)	Ehui 75'		Own Goal 91'

8 November 2016	Royston Town	1–2	Chalfont St Peter	Garden Walk, Royston
19:45 BST (UTC+01)	Ehui 69'		Hedley 59'; Lockhart-Adams 64'	Attendance: 79

8 November 2016	Salisbury	2–0	Winchester City	The Raymond McEnhill Stadium, Salisbury
19:45 BST (UTC+01)	Wright 71', 86'			Attendance: 348

15 November 2016	Shortwood United	2–2 (4–3 p)	Larkhall Athletic	Meadowbank Ground, Nailsworth
19:45 BST (UTC+01)	Ajijedidun 8', 73'		Knighton 59'; Allward 74'	Attendance: 45

8 November 2016	St Ives Town	3–0	Bedford Town	ProEdge Westwood Road, St Ives
19:45 BST (UTC+01)	Dawkin 50'; Ogbonna 58', 66'			Attendance: 102

8 November 2016	Stratford Town	4–0	Leamington	The DCS Stadium, Stratford upon Avon
19:45 BST (UTC+01)	Taylor 19'; Grocott 25', 27'; Gregory 48' (pen.)			Attendance: 232

=== 3rd round ===
10 January 2017	Aylesbury	2–3	Barton Rovers	Haywood Way, Aylesbury
19:45 BST (UTC+01)	Bateman 48'; Bamford 60'		Smith 3'; Malcolm 32'; Hutchings 62'	Attendance: 59

11 January 2017	Aylesbury United	3–2	Banbury United	Meadow View Park, Thame
19:45 BST (UTC+01)	Lobo De Brito 76', 93'; Coulter 93'		Bell 12'; Carnell 31'	Attendance: 112

10 January 2017	Barnstaple Town	2–1	Paulton Rovers	Haywood Way, Aylesbury
19:45 BST (UTC+01)	Blake 54'; Allan 86'		Gould 91'	Attendance: 108

10 January 2017	Bishop's Cleeve	1–1 (4–3 p)	Stratford Town	Kayte Lane, Bishop's Cleeve
19:45 BST (UTC+01)	Watts 78'		Ahenkorah 52' (pen.)	Attendance: 72

10 January 2017	Hayes & Yeading United	3–0	Basingstoke Town	SkyEx Community Stadium, Hayes, Hillingdon
19:45 BST (UTC+01)	Weiss 41', 53', 71'			Attendance: 62

10 January 2017	Northwood	0–1	Chalfont St Peter	Northwood Park, Chestnut Avenue, Northwood
19:45 BST (UTC+01)			Lockhart-Adams 43'	Attendance: 59

7 February 2017	Salisbury	4–3	Shortwood United	The Raymond McEnhill Stadium, Salisbury
19:45 BST (UTC+01)	O'Keefe 64', 94'; Allan 91', 95' (pen.)		Peare 38'; Allan 41', 53'	Attendance: 331

10 January 2017	St Ives Town	3–0	Biggleswade Town	ProEdge Westwood Road, St Ives
19:45 BST (UTC+01)	Cunniff 53'; Sinclair 70'; Dawkin 93'			Attendance: 105

=== Quarter-finals ===
14 February 2017	Barnstaple Town	1–2	Salisbury	Mill Road, Barnstaple
19:45 BST (UTC+01)	Turner 90'		Wright 37'; Roberts 69'	Attendance: 159

31 January 2017	Barton Rovers	2–3	St Ives Town	Sharpenhoe Road, Barton–le–Clay
19:45 BST (UTC+01)	Hall 81'; Hartley 90'		Dawkin 9', 85'; Cunniff 73'	Attendance: 80

21 February 2017	Bishop's Cleeve	0–2	Aylesbury United	Kayte Lane, Bishop's Cleeve
19:45 BST (UTC+01)			Baines 37'; Cameron 88'	Attendance: 57

31 January 2017	Hayes & Yeading United	4–2	Chalfont St Peter	SkyEx Community Stadium, Hayes, Hillingdon
19:45 BST (UTC+01)	Weiss 22', 36', 41', 56'		Pink 20'; Olorunfemi 90'	Attendance: 69

=== Semi-finals ===
28 February 2017	Hayes & Yeading United	4–0	Salisbury	Beaconsfield SYOB FC
19:45 BST (UTC+01)	Edgar 23'; Sambou 52'; Montgomery 55'; Flint 90' (o.g.)			Attendance: 139

14 March 2017	St Ives Town	2–0	Aylesbury United	ProEdge Westwood Road, St Ives
19:45 BST (UTC+01)	Dawkin 20', 39'			Attendance: 117

=== Final ===
29 April 2017	Hayes & Yeading United	1–1 (4–2 p)	St Ives Town	Westwood Road, St Ives
15:00 BST (UTC+01)				Attendance: 385

== See also ==
- Southern Football League
- 2016–17 Isthmian League
- 2016–17 Northern Premier League
