= 2015–16 Hellenic Football League =

The 2015–16 Hellenic Football League season was the 63rd in the history of the Hellenic Football League, a football competition in England.

== Premier Division ==
Hellenic Football League Premier Division
- Season: 2015–16
- Champions: Kidlington
- Promoted: Kidlington
- Relegated: Wokingham & Emmbrook; Abingdon United; Milton United; Tuffley Rovers
- Matches: 380
- Goals: 1,369 (3.6 per match)

Premier Division featured 15 clubs which competed in the division last season, along with five new clubs:

- Clubs promoted Division One East:
  - Brackley Town Saints
  - Wokingham & Emmbrook
- Clubs promoted Division One West:
  - Longlevens
  - Lydney Town
  - Tuffley Rovers

Also, Wootton Bassett Town changed name to Royal Wootton Bassett Town.

Three clubs have applied for promotion to Step 4: Flackwell Heath, Kidlington and Thatcham Town.

=== League table ===
Pos	Team	Pld	W	D	L	GF	GA	GD	Pts	Promotion or relegation
1	Kidlington	38	31	4	3	118	33	+85	97	Promoted to the Southern Football League
2	Thatcham Town	38	28	6	4	101	45	+56	90	
3	Flackwell Heath	38	26	4	8	98	50	+48	82	
4	Ascot United	38	23	7	8	75	42	+33	76	
5	Brimscombe & Thrupp	38	21	4	13	75	60	+15	67	
6	Thame United	38	19	7	12	58	46	+12	64	
7	Highworth Town	38	19	5	14	85	49	+36	62	
8	Binfield	38	19	5	14	79	63	+16	62	
9	Oxford City Nomads	38	18	5	15	65	64	+1	59	
10	Longlevens	38	18	2	18	64	70	−6	56	
11	Highmoor Ibis	38	16	5	17	57	60	−3	53	
12	Lydney Town	38	14	10	14	63	66	−3	52	
13	Ardley United	38	16	2	20	68	75	−7	50	
14	Bracknell Town	38	12	10	16	66	72	−6	46	
15	Royal Wootton Bassett Town	38	12	5	21	50	86	−36	41	
16	Brackley Town Saints	38	10	5	23	62	90	−28	35	
17	Tuffley Rovers	38	8	8	22	61	88	−27	32	
18	Milton United	38	6	9	23	45	95	−50	27	Relegated to Division One West
19	Abingdon United	38	6	3	29	42	109	−67	21	Relegated to Division One West
20	Wokingham & Emmbrook	38	3	4	31	37	106	−69	13	Relegated to Division One East

Source: fchd
Rules for classification: 1) points; 2) goal difference; 3) number of goals scored.

== Division One East ==
Hellenic Football League Division One East
- Season: 2015–16
- Champions: Penn & Tylers Green
- Promoted: Henley Town
- Matches: 156
- Goals: 572 (3.67 per match)

Division One East featured ten clubs which competed in the division last season, along with four new clubs:

- Bicester Town, reformed club
- Holyport, relegated from the Premier Division
- Reading Town, relegated from the Premier Division
- Wantage Town reserves, transferred from Division One West

Also, Woodley Town changed name to Woodley United.

=== League table ===
Pos	Team	Pld	W	D	L	GF	GA	GD	Pts	Promotion
1	Penn & Tylers Green	24	18	4	2	72	12	+60	58	
2	Bicester Town	24	18	3	3	67	31	+36	57	
3	Henley Town	24	14	4	6	63	37	+26	46	Promoted to the Premier Division
4	Headington Amateurs	24	13	3	8	51	29	+22	42	
5	Rayners Lane	24	10	8	6	47	30	+17	38	
6	Chinnor	24	11	5	8	47	35	+12	38	
7	Holyport	24	10	4	10	44	43	+1	34	
8	Finchampstead	24	8	8	8	41	31	+10	32	
9	Chalfont Wasps	24	5	7	12	38	64	−26	22	
10	Wantage Town reserves	24	6	4	14	30	58	−28	22	
11	Didcot Town reserves	24	6	2	16	31	75	−44	20	
12	Old Woodstock Town	24	5	2	17	21	62	−41	17	Transferred to Division One West
13	Woodley United	24	4	2	18	20	65	−45	14	
14	Reading Town	0	0	0	0	0	0	0	0	Club folded, record expunged

Source: fchd
Rules for classification: 1) points; 2) goal difference; 3) number of goals scored.

== Division One West ==
Hellenic Football League Division One West
- Season: 2015–16
- Champions: Carterton
- Promoted: Carterton
- Matches: 182
- Goals: 658 (3.62 per match)

Division One West featured eleven clubs which competed in the division last season, along with three new clubs:

- Cheltenham Saracens, relegated from Premier Division
- Easington Sports, transferred from Division One East
- Shrivenham, relegated from Premier Division

=== League table ===
Pos	Team	Pld	W	D	L	GF	GA	GD	Pts	Promotion
1	Carterton	26	21	3	2	74	23	+51	66	Promoted to the Premier Division
2	Cheltenham Saracens	26	20	4	2	65	26	+39	64	
3	Hook Norton	26	18	3	5	66	28	+38	57	
4	Fairford Town	26	18	3	5	60	27	+33	57	
5	Easington Sports	26	13	5	8	63	41	+22	44	
6	North Leigh United	26	10	2	14	52	62	−10	32	
7	Purton	26	7	9	10	43	44	−1	30	
8	Shrivenham	26	8	6	12	31	42	−11	30	
9	Letcombe	26	7	9	10	28	40	−12	30	
10	Shortwood United reserves	26	8	5	13	47	62	−15	28 (Note: Shortwood United reserves were deducted one point for a breach of league rules in their game against Letcombe on 26 September.)	
11	Cirencester Town development	26	7	6	13	48	53	−5	27	
12	Clanfield	26	5	7	14	34	58	−24	22	
13	New College Swindon	26	4	2	20	25	68	−43	14	
14	Tytherington Rocks	26	3	2	21	22	84	−62	11	

Source: fchd
Rules for classification: 1) points; 2) goal difference; 3) number of goals scored.

== Division Two East ==
Hellenic Football League Division Two East
- Season: 2015–16
- Champions: Penn & Tylers Green reserves

Division Two East featured 9 clubs which competed in the division last season, along with 2 new clubs:

- Milton United reserves
- Sandhurst Town reserves

=== League table ===
Pos	Team	Pld	W	D	L	GF	GA	GD	Pts	Qualification
1	Penn & Tylers Green reserves	18	13	4	1	65	15	+50	43	
2	Thame United reserves	18	11	4	3	34	19	+15	37	
3	Sandhurst Town reserves	18	9	4	5	53	37	+16	31	
4	Flackwell Heath reserves	18	9	4	5	49	40	+9	31	
5	Ascot United reserves	18	8	2	8	35	33	+2	26	Resigned from the league
6	Bracknell Town reserves	18	7	4	7	44	36	+8	25	Resigned from the league
7	Stokenchurch	18	5	3	10	35	49	−14	18	
8	Holyport reserves	18	4	5	9	22	37	−15	17	
9	Wokingham & Emmbrook reserves	18	4	4	10	35	61	−26	16	
10	Chinnor reserves	18	2	2	14	20	65	−45	8	Resigned from the league
11	Milton United reserves	0	0	0	0	0	0	0	0	Withdrew, records expunged

Source: fchd
Rules for classification: 1) points; 2) goal difference; 3) number of goals scored.

== Division Two West ==
Hellenic Football League Division Two West
- Season: 2015–16
- Champions: Oxford City Nomads development

Division Two West featured 10 clubs which competed in the division last season, along with 3 new clubs:

- Moreton Rangers, joined from the Gloucestershire Northern Senior League
- Purton reserves
- Cheltenham Saracens reserves, rejoined the League

=== League table ===
Pos	Team	Pld	W	D	L	GF	GA	GD	Pts	Qualification
1	Oxford City Nomads development	22	19	3	0	100	21	+79	60	
2	Kidlington reserves	22	14	2	6	70	35	+35	44	
3	Moreton Rangers	22	13	5	4	57	29	+28	44	
4	Brimscombe & Thrupp reserves	22	10	8	4	52	31	+21	38	
5	Old Woodstock Town reserves	22	10	6	6	56	41	+15	36	Resigned from the league
6	Fairford Town reserves	22	8	7	7	49	39	+10	31	
7	Highworth Town reserves	22	9	4	9	46	40	+6	31	
8	Purton reserves	22	8	5	9	58	63	−5	29	
9	Clanfield reserves	22	5	3	14	39	65	−26	18	
10	Cheltenham Saracens reserves	22	5	2	15	27	66	−39	17	Resigned from the league
11	Hook Norton reserves	22	4	1	17	23	93	−70	13	
12	Letcombe reserves	22	3	2	17	23	77	−54	11	Resigned from the league
13	Shrivenham reserves	0	0	0	0	0	0	0	0	Withdrew, record expunged

Source: fchd
Rules for classification: 1) points; 2) goal difference; 3) number of goals scored.
