= 2018–19 Southern Football League =

The 2018–19 season was the 116th in the history of the Southern League since its establishment in 1894. The league (known as Evo-Stik League Southern, following a sponsorship deal with Evo-Stik) has two Premier divisions (Central and South) at step 3 of the National League System (NLS) and two Division One divisions (Central and South) at step 4 of the NLS.

This was the first season to consist of four divisions in the league, following a shakeup of the Southern, Isthmian, and Northern Premier Leagues divisions by geographical region. The Southern League was chosen to create a new division at Step 3; the 21 clubs remaining from the Premier Division the previous season were split into two new Premier divisions; Central and South. The league constitution was announced in May 2018.

== Premier Division Central ==
Southern Football League Premier Division Central
- Season: 2018–19
- Champions: Kettering Town
- Promoted: Kettering Town; King's Lynn Town
- Relegated: Bedworth United; Halesowen Town; St Neots Town
- Matches: 462
- Goals: 1,272 (2.75 per match)
- Top goalscorer: 24 goals - Adam Marriott (King's Lynn Town)
- Total attendance: 165,929
- Average attendance: 359 (-22.6% to previous season)

At the end of the previous season a new division was created at step 3, while the number of clubs in step 3 divisions was reduced from 24 to 22. The Premier Division Central consisted of ten clubs from the previous season Premier Division, and twelve new clubs.

- Promoted from Division One East:
  - AFC Rushden & Diamonds
- Promoted from the Northern Premier League Division One South:
  - Alvechurch
  - Bedworth United
- Relegated from the National League North:
  - Tamworth
- Transferred from the Isthmian League Premier Division:
  - Leiston
  - Lowestoft Town
  - Needham Market
- Transferred from the Northern Premier League Premier Division:
  - Barwell
  - Coalville Town
  - Halesowen Town
  - Rushall Olympic
  - Stourbridge

=== League table ===
Pos	Team	Pld	W	D	L	GF	GA	GD	Pts	Promotion, qualification or relegation
1	Kettering Town	42	30	4	8	84	41	+43	94	Promoted to the National League North
2	King's Lynn Town	42	23	11	8	80	41	+39	80	Qualified for the play-offs, then promoted to the National League North (Note: Four teams played for one spot in the super playoff final against playoff winners from Northern Premier League. Super playoff final winners were to be promoted to the National League North.)
3	Stourbridge	42	22	12	8	79	40	+39	78	Qualified for the play-offs
4	Alvechurch	42	21	10	11	66	53	+13	73	Qualified for the play-offs
5	Stratford Town	42	21	9	12	55	49	+6	72	Qualified for the play-offs
6	Coalville Town	42	20	7	15	78	66	+12	67	
7	Biggleswade Town	42	18	12	12	67	54	+13	66	
8	Rushall Olympic	42	17	11	14	56	49	+7	62	
9	AFC Rushden & Diamonds	42	15	16	11	60	49	+11	61	
10	Royston Town	42	18	7	17	59	53	+6	60 (Note: Royston United were deducted one point for fielding an ineligible player.)	
11	Needham Market	42	17	9	16	68	65	+3	60	
12	Tamworth	42	15	13	14	64	46	+18	58	
13	St Ives Town	42	14	13	15	36	43	−7	55	
14	Lowestoft Town	42	14	9	19	55	60	−5	51	
15	Redditch United	42	14	8	20	63	79	−16	50	
16	Barwell	42	12	13	17	55	55	0	49	
17	Banbury United	42	13	14	15	53	55	−2	49 (Note: Banbury United were deducted four points for infringement of league rules.)	
18	Hitchin Town	42	14	6	22	50	71	−21	48	
19	Leiston	42	12	11	19	54	73	−19	47	
20	St Neots Town	42	9	9	24	32	73	−41	36	Relegated to Division One Central
21	Halesowen Town	42	6	14	22	26	66	−40	32	Relegated to Division One Central
22	Bedworth United	42	3	10	29	32	91	−59	19	Relegated to Division One Central

Source: SL official site
Rules for classification: 1) Points; 2) Goal difference; 3) Number of goals scored; 4) Number of matches won; 5) Head-to-head results

==== Play-offs ====
Semi-finals
2	King's Lynn Town	3
5	Stratford Town	1
3	Stourbridge	1
4	Alvechurch	2

Final
2	King's Lynn Town	3
4	Alvechurch	0

Super final
NPL	Warrington Town	2
2	King's Lynn Town (a.e.t.)	3

==== Semi-finals ====
4 May	King's Lynn Town	3–1	Stratford Town	The Walks, King's Lynn
	Hawkins 49'; Clunan 61'; McAuley 77'		Taylor 35'	Attendance: 1,253

4 May	Stourbridge	1–2	Alvechurch	War Memorial Ground, Amblecote
	Mills 45' (pen.)		Carvalho-Landell 55'; Roberts 60'	Attendance: 894

==== Final ====
6 May	King's Lynn Town	3–0	Alvechurch	The Walks, King's Lynn
	Marriott 11', 49' (pen.); Gash 87'			Attendance: 1,617

==== Super final ====
11 May	Warrington Town	2–3 (a.e.t.)	King's Lynn Town	Warrington
	Garrity 18', 60'		Richards 15'; Marriott 85' (pen.); Gash 115'	Stadium: Cantilever Park; Attendance: 2,200

=== Results table ===
Home \ Away	RUD	ALV	BAN	BAR	BED	BIG	COA	HAL	HIT	KET	KIN	LEI	LOW	NEE	RED	ROY	RUS	SIV	SNE	STO	STR	TAM
AFC Rushden & Diamonds		1–1	1–1	1–1	3–1	3–3	3–1	2–0	2–1	0–1	1–0	1–1	1–1	2–1	5–2	0–0	0–2	0–0	2–0	1–2	2–0	2–2
Alvechurch	0–0		1–1	1–5	3–0	2–1	5–0	1–0	3–1	1–3	0–3	2–1	4–2	3–0	3–0	0–0	1–0	2–1	3–2	0–0	2–2	0–3
Banbury United	1–0	3–1		6–1	1–1	1–2	4–2	2–1	1–2	4–1	2–0	1–0	0–0	2–1	1–1	0–1	2–1	1–2	1–3	0–0	1–1	0–0
Barwell	1–1	1–2	2–1		1–1	0–0	2–3	1–1	0–1	0–1	1–3	3–0	1–1	0–2	4–0	1–2	1–3	1–1	6–1	1–1	0–0	0–1
Bedworth United	1–3	0–2	1–3	0–1		1–4	0–1	0–1	2–2	1–2	0–3	2–2	1–1	0–4	0–2	1–2	1–3	0–2	1–0	0–3	0–2	1–4
Biggleswade Town	1–0	4–2	0–0	1–1	1–1		3–0	1–0	1–1	1–0	1–2	1–2	3–1	2–0	2–0	1–4	0–1	1–0	1–0	1–2	0–0	3–0
Coalville Town	2–2	2–0	1–1	1–0	1–0	2–0		3–0	4–1	2–2	3–3	2–2	1–0	1–2	1–2	2–3	2–2	0–1	1–1	6–4	1–2	1–2
Halesowen Town	0–1	1–1	2–0	0–2	1–3	1–1	1–3		0–0	0–1	2–2	0–0	1–0	1–1	1–0	1–0	2–0	1–1	1–1	0–3	0–2	0–1
Hitchin Town	3–4	1–1	0–1	2–0	4–1	0–2	1–0	5–1		0–1	3–0	2–2	1–3	1–2	1–0	0–2	0–1	1–0	0–2	2–1	2–0	1–0
Kettering Town	2–1	1–2	3–0	0–1	5–1	2–3	2–3	2–0	5–0		2–1	1–2	3–0	3–2	4–4	1–0	2–1	0–3	2–0	4–2	5–1	2–1
King’s Lynn Town	1–1	1–0	3–1	3–2	1–1	2–4	4–1	3–0	3–2	0–0		1–1	4–0	1–1	2–0	4–2	3–0	2–0	0–0	0–1	0–0	2–1
Leiston	1–4	2–0	0–0	0–1	1–1	3–0	2–0	4–0	1–2	0–1	1–5		0–4	2–1	4–3	1–1	0–1	0–2	2–0	0–3	1–2	2–2
Lowestoft Town	1–1	1–2	1–0	0–0	3–0	2–1	1–2	5–1	3–2	0–1	1–0	1–2		0–2	0–0	2–0	2–4	0–1	1–2	1–0	3–2	1–3
Needham Market	1–5	1–0	3–3	0–2	4–1	1–0	1–1	1–1	8–1	0–3	1–4	2–2	1–0		3–1	0–2	1–1	4–1	0–1	0–0	2–1	1–3
Redditch United	2–2	4–2	2–0	2–4	0–1	3–3	1–5	3–0	3–1	1–4	1–1	3–1	4–2	4–1		1–2	2–1	2–0	1–1	0–4	0–1	0–0
Royston Town	2–1	0–1	3–0	1–0	2–0	4–6	2–0	0–0	1–0	0–1	0–2	2–5	1–1	2–4	0–1		1–3	1–2	5–0	3–2	2–2	0–2
Rushall Olympic	2–1	1–2	1–1	1–1	0–0	2–2	0–2	0–0	1–2	0–1	2–1	2–0	3–1	0–1	1–3	0–3		4–1	3–2	0–0	2–2	1–1
St Ives Town	0–0	0–2	2–2	1–2	2–1	0–1	0–1	2–0	2–1	1–2	1–1	0–2	0–0	1–1	1–0	0–0	0–3		0–0	0–0	0–2	1–0
St Neots Town	0–1	0–3	0–3	1–0	2–1	2–2	1–4	1–1	0–0	0–3	0–5	2–0	1–3	0–3	3–1	1–0	0–1	0–1		1–2	1–2	0–0
Stourbridge	2–1	3–3	2–0	3–0	4–1	2–0	4–2	1–1	3–0	1–2	1–2	4–0	3–1	3–1	4–1	2–1	1–1	1–1	1–0		3–0	1–1
Stratford Town	1–0	0–1	2–1	2–1	3–1	3–2	0–2	2–1	2–0	1–3	0–2	3–2	1–3	3–1	2–0	2–0	0–1	0–0	1–0	0–0		2–1
Tamworth	1–1	1–1	4–0	3–3	2–2	1–1	1–3	4–1	2–0	0–0	0–1	5–0	0–2	1–2	1–3	1–2	2–0	1–2	5–0	1–0	0–1	

Source: SFL official site
Legend: Blue = home team win; Yellow = draw; Red = away team win.

=== Stadia and locations ===
Locations of the Premier Division Central clubs

Club	Stadium	Capacity
AFC Rushden & Diamonds	Hayden Road (groundshare with Rushden & Higham United)	2,000
Alvechurch	Lye Meadow	3,000
Banbury United	Spencer Stadium	2,000
Barwell	Kirkby Road	2,500
Bedworth United	The Oval	3,000
Biggleswade Town	Langford Road	3,000
Coalville Town	Owen Street Sports Ground	2,000
Halesowen Town	The Grove	3,150
Hitchin Town	Top Field	4,554
Kettering Town	Latimer Park (groundshare with Burton Park Wanderers)	2,400
King's Lynn Town	The Walks	5,733
Leiston	Victory Road	2,250
Lowestoft Town	Crown Meadow	3,000
Needham Market	Bloomfields	4,000
Redditch United	The Valley	5,000
Royston Town	Garden Walk	5,000
Rushall Olympic	Dales Lane	2,000
St Ives Town	Westwood Road	2,000
St Neots Town	New Rowley Park	3,500
Stourbridge	War Memorial Athletic Ground	2,626
Stratford Town	Knights Lane	2,000
Tamworth	The Lamb Ground	4,565

== Premier Division South ==
Southern Football League Premier Division South
- Season: 2018–19
- Champions: Weymouth
- Promoted: Weymouth
- Relegated: Staines Town; Frome Town; Basingstoke Town
- Matches: 462
- Goals: 1,596 (3.45 per match)
- Top goalscorer: 37 goals - Brandon Goodship (Weymouth)
- Total attendance: 155,931
- Average attendance: 338 (-27.2% to previous season)

At the end of the previous season a new division was created at step 3, while the number of clubs in step 3 divisions was reduced from 24 to 22. The Premier Division South consisted of ten clubs from the previous season Premier Division, and twelve new clubs.

- Promoted from Division One East:
  - Beaconsfield Town
  - Hartley Wintney
- Promoted from Division One West:
  - Taunton Town
  - Salisbury
  - Swindon Supermarine
  - Wimborne Town
- Promoted from the Isthmian League South Division:
  - Walton Casuals
- Relegated from the National League South:
  - Poole Town
- Transferred from the Isthmian League Premier Division:
  - Harrow Borough
  - Hendon
  - Metropolitan Police
  - Staines Town

=== League table ===
Pos	Team	Pld	W	D	L	GF	GA	GD	Pts	Promotion, qualification or relegation
1	Weymouth	42	25	11	6	96	51	+45	86	Promoted to the National League South
2	Taunton Town	42	26	7	9	89	56	+33	85	Qualified for the play-offs (Note: Four teams played for one spot in the super playoff final against playoff winners from the Isthmian League. Super playoff final winners were to be promoted to the National League South.)
3	Metropolitan Police	42	22	12	8	91	64	+27	78	Qualified for the play-offs
4	Salisbury	42	22	11	9	97	69	+28	77	Qualified for the play-offs
5	Poole Town	42	20	10	12	84	59	+25	70	Qualified for the play-offs
6	Kings Langley	42	21	6	15	65	61	+4	69	Transferred to Premier Division Central
7	Harrow Borough	42	18	9	15	97	77	+20	63	
8	Hartley Wintney	42	17	12	13	82	70	+12	63	
9	Farnborough	42	18	8	16	72	72	0	62	
10	Chesham United	42	15	14	13	54	55	−1	59	
11	Swindon Supermarine	42	16	10	16	70	59	+11	58	
12	Beaconsfield Town	42	15	13	14	65	65	0	58	
13	Merthyr Town	42	15	9	18	68	67	+1	54	
14	Wimborne Town	42	15	7	20	72	75	−3	52	
15	Dorchester Town	42	14	10	18	67	75	−8	52	
16	Hendon	42	14	10	18	64	74	−10	52	
17	Walton Casuals	42	14	9	19	69	78	−9	51	
18	Tiverton Town	42	13	12	17	65	75	−10	51	
19	Gosport Borough	42	15	5	22	63	70	−7	50	
20	Basingstoke Town	42	14	7	21	81	82	−1	49	Relegated to Division One South
21	Frome Town	42	11	4	27	45	74	−29	37	Relegated to Division One South
22	Staines Town	42	4	0	38	40	168	−128	12	Relegated to the Isthmian League South Central Division

Source: SL official site
Rules for classification: 1) Points; 2) Goal difference; 3) Number of goals scored; 4) Number of matches won; 5) Head-to-head results

==== Play-offs ====
Semi-finals
2	Taunton Town	1 (3)
5	Poole Town	1 (4)
3	Metropolitan Police	3
4	Salisbury	2

Final
3	Metropolitan Police	1
5	Poole Town	0

Super final
IL	Tonbridge Angels (a.e.t.)	3
3	Metropolitan Police	2

==== Semi-finals ====
1 May	Metropolitan Police	3–2	Salisbury	Imber Court, Molesey
	Mazzone 8', 44' (pen.); Blackmore 61'		Downing 13'; Benson 68'	Attendance: 448

1 May	Taunton Town	1–1 (3–4 p)	Poole Town	The Viridor Stadium, Taunton
	Brett 49'		Dickson 43'	Attendance: 1,053

==== Final ====
6 May	Metropolitan Police	1–0	Poole Town	East Molesey
	Mazzone 73'			Stadium: Imber Court; Attendance: 1,025

==== Super final ====
11 May	Metropolitan Police	2–3 (a.e.t.)	Tonbridge Angels	East Molesey
	Chislett 18'; Robinson 56'		Lee 52'; Theobalds 86'; Derry 97'	Stadium: Imber Court; Attendance: 1,260

=== Results table ===
Home \ Away	BAS	BEA	CHE	DOR	FAR	FRO	GOS	HAB	HAR	HEN	KIN	MER	MET	POO	SAL	STA	SWI	TAU	TIV	WAL	WEY	WIM
Basingstoke Town		2–1	2–3	1–2	1–1	4–1	2–1	2–2	1–3	2–1	3–0	0–3	2–2	1–2	0–2	10–3	2–0	1–2	3–3	2–1	1–2	3–2
Beaconsfield Town	3–2		7–0	2–2	2–6	2–2	4–3	4–1	3–3	0–0	4–2	1–1	0–1	1–1	2–2	3–2	1–0	1–2	0–2	1–1	1–0	2–0
Chesham United	2–1	0–0		0–0	0–1	2–1	1–0	0–4	2–2	2–2	3–0	0–3	1–1	5–1	1–4	7–0	0–0	0–1	1–1	0–2	0–5	1–1
Dorchester Town	4–1	1–3	0–5		0–6	0–1	0–0	3–2	2–1	0–3	2–2	0–0	0–1	0–2	1–4	6–1	0–3	1–2	6–0	1–1	0–1	1–1
Farnborough	2–1	2–0	0–1	2–2		3–2	2–1	4–1	1–1	3–0	0–1	0–1	0–0	1–2	0–3	1–0	2–1	1–4	3–2	1–0	4–3	3–1
Frome Town	1–4	0–1	0–2	0–1	2–3		2–0	1–3	0–1	1–1	1–0	2–3	0–3	1–1	0–0	2–0	1–2	2–0	1–3	3–0	0–2	1–0
Gosport Borough	3–2	2–3	0–0	1–4	0–2	3–1		0–1	1–0	3–1	3–2	0–3	6–3	3–2	1–4	2–1	2–1	1–2	0–1	0–0	0–2	1–0
Harrow Borough	2–1	2–1	0–2	4–1	5–0	1–2	0–1		2–2	3–1	3–4	3–0	4–3	4–0	1–1	9–1	1–3	1–0	2–2	1–1	2–3	0–2
Hartley Wintney	0–2	2–0	1–2	3–1	2–2	2–1	1–0	3–0		2–3	0–0	1–1	1–4	4–3	3–4	7–0	2–2	3–1	1–0	3–4	0–3	3–0
Hendon	1–0	2–2	0–1	0–0	2–1	0–1	0–4	2–4	0–2		1–2	3–0	1–3	1–0	2–2	5–1	1–0	2–3	2–2	3–0	2–3	3–2
Kings Langley	2–0	3–0	1–0	1–0	5–1	2–0	3–0	2–4	2–1	3–1		1–0	1–2	0–3	1–1	3–1	1–2	1–2	2–2	1–0	2–1	1–0
Merthyr Town	1–0	0–1	1–0	1–7	0–0	1–3	4–2	1–1	1–2	0–2	1–1		2–2	0–2	1–2	9–0	2–2	3–1	5–1	1–2	2–1	2–0
Metropolitan Police	4–4	3–1	1–0	2–1	4–3	2–1	2–2	1–0	5–1	3–0	1–0	2–0		1–2	2–2	2–0	0–2	4–1	3–2	2–2	4–4	4–2
Poole Town	3–2	2–1	0–0	0–1	6–0	3–0	1–1	3–3	1–3	0–2	3–0	3–1	2–2		2–2	0–2	2–5	1–0	3–0	3–1	1–1	2–5
Salisbury	2–1	2–1	1–1	3–0	3–2	1–0	0–2	0–6	4–2	3–1	1–2	2–0	1–1	1–2		3–2	2–2	3–2	3–1	4–2	3–4	4–3
Staines Town	0–3	0–1	3–1	1–6	0–3	1–0	0–5	1–5	3–5	2–5	0–2	2–6	0–5	0–7	1–7		2–1	1–3	2–4	1–4	1–4	2–4
Swindon Supermarine	5–2	4–0	0–0	2–0	4–2	0–4	2–1	1–2	1–1	0–1	3–4	3–0	1–0	1–1	2–2	3–0		0–1	0–1	2–1	1–1	3–2
Taunton Town	0–0	2–1	4–0	1–1	2–1	3–0	3–2	7–0	2–2	3–3	2–1	3–2	1–3	1–0	4–3	4–0	1–1		2–1	4–0	3–3	4–2
Tiverton Town	4–1	1–1	0–2	2–3	1–1	3–1	1–0	1–1	1–1	0–0	1–2	2–2	2–1	0–2	2–0	3–2	2–2	1–3		5–1	1–2	0–3
Walton Casuals	3–3	1–1	2–2	2–3	2–1	4–1	3–1	3–2	1–2	5–1	1–0	1–3	2–2	0–4	3–1	3–1	3–1	0–1	1–2		1–2	3–0
Weymouth	1–2	1–1	1–1	5–0	3–0	4–0	1–3	2–2	2–2	3–0	2–2	2–1	4–0	2–2	2–1	4–0	2–1	2–1	2–1	3–2		1–0
Wimborne Town	2–4	0–1	0–0	2–4	1–1	3–2	3–2	5–3	2–1	3–3	5–0	4–0	3–0	0–4	1–4	1–0	1–0	1–1	2–1	3–0	0–0	

Source: SFL official site
Legend: Blue = home team win; Yellow = draw; Red = away team win.

=== Stadia and locations ===
Locations of the Premier Division South clubs
Greater London and environ Premier Division South clubs

Club	Stadium	Capacity
Basingstoke Town	The Camrose	6,000
Beaconsfield Town	Holloways Park	3,500
Chesham United	The Meadow	5,000
Dorchester Town	The Avenue Stadium	5,000
Farnborough	Cherrywood Road	7,000
Frome Town	Badgers Hill	2,000
Gosport Borough	Privett Park	4,500
Harrow Borough	Earlsmead Stadium	3,000
Hartley Wintney	The Memorial Playing Fields	2,000
Hendon	Silver Jubilee Park	2,000
Kings Langley	Gaywood Park	2,000
Merthyr Town	Penydarren Park	4,000
Metropolitan Police	Imber Court	3,000
Poole Town	The BlackGold Stadium	2,500
Salisbury	Raymond McEnhill Stadium	5,000
Staines Town	Wheatsheaf Park	3,000
Swindon Supermarine	Hunts Copse Ground	3,000
Taunton Town	Wordsworth Drive	2,500
Tiverton Town	Ladysmead	3,500
Walton Casuals	Elmbridge Xcel Sports Hub	2,500
Weymouth	Bob Lucas Stadium	6,600
Wimborne Town	The Cuthbury	3,000

== Division One Central ==
Southern Football League Division One Central
- Season: 2018–19
- Champions: Peterborough Sports
- Promoted: Peterborough Sports; Bromsgrove Sporting
- Relegated: Aylesbury; Dunstable Town
- Matches: 380
- Goals: 1,335 (3.51 per match)
- Top goalscorer: 30 goals - Jason Cowley (Bromsgrove Sporting)
- Total attendance: 71,714
- Average attendance: 189

A new division was added at step 4 within the Isthmian League, while the number of clubs in every step 4 division was decreased to 20. Division One Central featured eight clubs from the previous season Division One West and twelve new clubs.

- Promoted from the Midland League:
  - Bromsgrove Sporting
  - Coleshill Town
- Promoted from the Spartan South Midlands League:
  - Welwyn Garden City
  - Berkhamsted
- Promoted from the United Counties League:
  - Yaxley
- Relegated from the Premier Division:
  - Dunstable Town
- Relegated from the Northern Premier League Premier Division:
  - Sutton Coldfield Town
- Transferred from Division One West:
  - Didcot Town
  - Kidlington
  - North Leigh
- Transferred from the Northern Premier League Division One South:
  - Corby Town
  - Peterborough Sports

=== League table ===
Pos	Team	Pld	W	D	L	GF	GA	GD	Pts	Promotion, qualification or relegation
1	Peterborough Sports	38	30	5	3	109	28	+81	95	Promoted to Premier Division Central
2	Bromsgrove Sporting	38	27	6	5	108	44	+64	87	Qualified for the play-offs, then promoted to the Premier Division Central (Note: Four teams played for one spot and possible promotion to Level 7. Five of seven level 8 play-off winners highest by points were to be promoted.)
3	Corby Town	38	24	5	9	106	60	+46	77	Qualified for play-offs
4	Bedford Town	38	21	2	15	84	52	+32	65	Qualified for play-offs
5	Sutton Coldfield Town	38	17	11	10	65	49	+16	62	Qualified for play-offs, then transferred to the Northern Premier League Division One South East
6	Berkhamsted	38	17	8	13	68	53	+15	59	
7	Didcot Town	38	16	10	12	69	61	+8	58	
8	Thame United	38	17	6	15	60	61	−1	57	
9	Coleshill Town	38	16	8	14	60	58	+2	56	
10	AFC Dunstable	38	16	7	15	58	71	−13	55	
11	Yaxley	38	15	4	19	72	92	−20	49	
12	Cambridge City	38	12	11	15	58	54	+4	47	Transferred to the Isthmian League North Division
13	Kempston Rovers	38	11	10	17	58	75	−17	43	
14	Welwyn Garden City	38	11	10	17	52	64	−12	42 (Note: Welwyn Garden City were deducted one point for fielding an ineligible player)	
15	Aylesbury United	38	12	6	20	62	86	−24	42	
16	Barton Rovers	38	10	11	17	45	68	−23	41	
17	North Leigh	38	9	7	22	67	106	−39	34	
18	Kidlington	38	9	7	22	43	82	−39	34	
19	Aylesbury	38	8	7	23	42	79	−37	31	Relegated to the Spartan South Midlands League
20	Dunstable Town	38	8	7	23	49	92	−43	31	Relegated to the Spartan South Midlands League

Source: Southern League Website
Rules for classification: 1) Points; 2) Goal difference; 3) Number of goals scored; 4) Number of matches won; 5) Head-to-head results

==== Play-offs ====
Semi-finals
2	Bromsgrove Sporting (a.e.t.)	3
5	Sutton Coldfield Town	2
3	Corby Town	5
4	Bedford Town	3

Final
2	Bromsgrove Sporting (a.e.t.)	4
3	Corby Town	3

==== Semi-finals ====
1 May	Bromsgrove Sporting	3–2 (a.e.t.)	Sutton Coldfield Town	Victoria Ground, Bromsgrove
	Gregory 32'; Cowley 40'; Hayward 102'		Gibson 52', 58'	Attendance: 1,849

1 May	Corby Town	5–3	Bedford Town	Steel Park, Corby
	Diggin 17'; Crawford 23'; Sandy 39', 53' (pen.); Carta 82'		Donnelly 61'; Hall 79'; Steele 88'	Attendance: 738

==== Final ====
6 May	Bromsgrove Sporting	4–3 (a.e.t.)	Corby Town	Victoria Ground, Bromsgrove
	Gregory 39'; Cowley 59', 61'; Westwood 104'		Sandy 33'; Diggin 64'; Crawford 84'	Attendance: 2,943

=== Results table ===
Home \ Away	DUN	AYL	AYU	BAR	BED	BER	BRO	CAM	COL	COR	DID	DUT	KEM	KID	NOR	PET	SUT	THA	WEL	YAX
AFC Dunstable		4–3	1–1	2–2	3–1	0–1	1–4	1–1	0–3	2–1	0–0	2–3	3–4	1–1	3–2	0–5	2–0	3–0	1–1	3–4
Aylesbury	0–2		3–1	2–2	1–0	0–3	0–0	3–0	1–1	1–4	2–4	3–2	1–2	0–1	0–3	1–0	0–2	0–3	0–0	0–1
Aylesbury United	1–2	2–0		2–2	1–4	2–4	0–3	1–1	3–4	1–2	1–4	3–0	3–1	2–1	1–4	0–4	1–2	0–1	3–1	2–1
Barton Rovers	0–2	1–1	1–1		0–8	1–2	0–3	3–1	2–4	5–2	1–2	1–1	0–3	2–3	2–1	1–1	1–3	2–4	1–0	0–0
Bedford Town	4–1	1–0	3–0	1–0		1–4	5–1	1–2	1–1	1–1	3–2	3–1	0–1	2–0	2–1	1–3	1–2	3–1	0–1	3–0
Berkhamsted	1–1	1–1	3–0	0–2	1–2		3–1	1–0	0–1	1–2	5–1	3–0	3–3	2–0	3–1	0–1	0–0	3–2	2–2	1–2
Bromsgrove Sporting	4–1	5–0	5–1	2–2	1–0	3–3		1–0	2–0	2–1	3–1	1–0	5–0	11–0	5–0	4–3	2–1	5–0	2–0	2–1
Cambridge City	0–1	2–3	3–4	0–0	3–2	0–2	1–1		2–0	1–1	2–0	3–3	1–0	0–0	6–1	1–3	0–2	1–1	4–1	6–2
Coleshill Town	1–2	2–0	0–1	1–1	2–3	2–2	3–0	0–2		0–2	2–1	3–1	1–2	2–0	0–4	2–3	2–1	2–2	2–1	1–1
Corby Town	2–1	5–2	3–2	3–0	4–1	3–1	6–0	4–1	3–0		3–2	1–2	5–1	3–1	5–2	1–3	1–0	1–3	1–4	3–2
Didcot Town	2–0	1–1	4–0	0–1	4–3	3–4	1–2	2–1	1–0	3–2		2–1	2–1	2–2	2–2	1–1	1–1	2–1	3–3	2–0
Dunstable Town	2–4	1–6	1–2	0–1	0–5	2–4	3–2	1–1	3–3	3–3	0–3		0–0	0–3	4–0	0–7	0–1	2–1	1–3	1–2
Kempston Rovers	1–2	3–0	2–2	1–3	1–3	3–0	0–4	1–1	2–5	1–3	1–1	1–3		3–2	1–1	1–2	1–1	1–1	2–3	2–2
Kidlington	0–0	3–2	2–4	1–2	0–5	1–0	0–4	2–0	0–1	1–2	1–2	1–5	0–3		3–3	0–2	0–4	0–1	0–0	6–1
North Leigh	1–2	3–1	4–2	1–0	2–3	1–1	1–5	2–4	1–2	1–8	2–0	3–1	3–1	0–3		3–3	2–5	1–2	3–3	3–3
Peterborough Sports	7–0	5–0	3–1	4–0	1–0	3–0	1–2	2–1	4–2	2–1	0–0	1–1	3–0	4–0	5–1		3–0	5–0	2–0	3–0
Sutton Coldfield Town	1–0	2–0	2–3	1–0	3–2	1–1	1–1	1–1	0–1	4–4	3–3	3–0	1–1	4–2	3–0	1–3		1–4	1–1	3–1
Thame United	3–1	4–1	2–1	0–2	2–1	2–1	1–1	1–0	0–2	1–1	0–1	5–0	1–3	0–0	3–2	0–1	0–3		4–2	2–1
Welwyn Garden City	0–1	2–0	0–0	1–0	0–3	0–1	0–3	0–1	2–2	2–5	2–1	0–1	1–2	2–1	3–0	1–3	1–1	3–1		3–2
Yaxley	4–2	1–3	3–7	4–1	1–2	2–1	3–6	0–4	2–0	0–4	4–3	2–0	3–2	1–2	6–2	1–3	3–0	2–1	4–3	

Source: SFL official site
Legend: Blue = home team win; Yellow = draw; Red = away team win.

=== Stadia and locations ===
Locations of Division One Central clubs

Club	Stadium	Capacity
AFC Dunstable	Creasey Park (groundshare with Dunstable Town)	3,200
Aylesbury	Haywood Way	1,300
Aylesbury United	The Meadow (groundshare with Chesham United)	5,000
Barton Rovers	Sharpenhoe Road	4,000
Bedford Town	The Eyrie	3,000
Berkhamsted	Broadwater	2,500
Bromsgrove Sporting	Victoria Ground	3,500
Cambridge City	Bridge Road (groundshare with Histon)	2,000
Coleshill Town	Pack Meadow	2,070
Corby Town	Steel Park	3,893
Didcot Town	Loop Meadow	3,000
Dunstable Town	Creasey Park (groundshare with AFC Dunstable)	3,200
Kempston Rovers	Hillgrounds Leisure	2,000
Kidlington	Yarnton Road	1,500
North Leigh	Eynsham Hall Park Sports Ground	2,000
Peterborough Sports	Lincoln Road	2,300
Sutton Coldfield Town	Central Ground	2,000
Thame United	Meadow View Park	2,000
Welwyn Garden City	Herns Way	1,000
Yaxley	Leading Drove	1,500

== Division One South ==
Southern Football League Division One South
- Season: 2018–19
- Champions: Blackfield & Langley
- Promoted: Blackfield & Langley; Yate Town
- Relegated: Fleet Town; Street
- Matches: 380
- Goals: 1,284 (3.38 per match)
- Top goalscorer: 31 goals - Benjamin Whitehead (Cirencester Town)
- Total attendance: 64,901
- Average attendance: 171

A new division was added at step 4 within the Isthmian League, while the number of clubs in every step 4 division was decreased to 20. Division One South featured 13 clubs from the previous season Division One East and seven new clubs.

- Promoted from the Hellenic League:
  - Thatcham Town
  - Highworth Town
- Promoted from the Wessex League:
  - Blackfield & Langley
- Promoted from the Western League:
  - Street
  - Melksham Town
- Transferred from Division One East:
  - Fleet Town
  - Moneyfields

=== League table ===
Pos	Team	Pld	W	D	L	GF	GA	GD	Pts	Promotion, qualification or relegation
1	Blackfield & Langley	38	26	4	8	75	34	+41	82	Promoted to Premier Division South
2	Cirencester Town	38	23	6	9	110	52	+58	75	Qualified for play-offs
3	Yate Town	38	23	6	9	74	51	+23	75	Qualified for the play-offs, then promoted to the Premier Division South (Note: Four teams played for one spot and possible promotion to Level 7. Five of seven level 8 play-off winners highest by points were to be promoted.)
4	Moneyfields	38	21	8	9	73	43	+30	71	Qualified for play-offs
5	Cinderford Town	38	21	8	9	64	39	+25	71	Qualified for play-offs
6	Winchester City	38	21	7	10	84	46	+38	70	
7	Evesham United	38	19	6	13	66	53	+13	63	
8	Street	38	17	10	11	58	51	+7	61	Resigned to the Western Football League
9	Bideford	38	18	4	16	66	68	−2	58	
10	AFC Totton	38	17	5	16	72	55	+17	56	
11	Thatcham Town	38	17	5	16	57	58	−1	56	
12	Melksham Town	38	17	5	16	59	70	−11	56	
13	Larkhall Athletic	38	16	7	15	52	51	+1	55	
14	Highworth Town	38	13	9	16	63	71	−8	48	
15	Bristol Manor Farm	38	13	7	18	65	77	−12	46	
16	Mangotsfield United	38	11	4	23	64	78	−14	37	
17	Paulton Rovers	38	10	3	25	49	79	−30	33	
18	Slimbridge	38	8	6	24	43	87	−44	30	
19	Barnstaple Town	38	6	5	27	42	100	−58	23	Reprieved from relegation (Note: Barnstaple Town were given a reprieve from relegation, after Street resigned from the division at the end of the season.)
20	Fleet Town	38	5	1	32	48	121	−73	16	Relegated to the Wessex League

Source: Southern League Website
Rules for classification: 1) Points; 2) Goal difference; 3) Number of goals scored; 4) Number of matches won; 5) Head-to-head results

==== Play-offs ====
Semi-finals
2	Cirencester Town	1
5	Cinderford Town	2
3	Yate Town	1 (5)
4	Moneyfields	1 (4)

Final
3	Yate Town	3
5	Cinderford Town	1

==== Semi-finals ====
1 May	Cirencester Town	1–2	Cinderford Town	Corinium Stadium, Cirencester
	Griffin 59'		Norman 61'; Hunt 85'	Attendance: 411

1 May	Yate Town	1–1 (5–4 p)	Moneyfields	Lodge Road, Yate
	Mehew 102'		Austin 104'	Attendance: 337

==== Final ====
6 May	Yate Town	3–1	Cinderford Town	Lodge Road, Yate
	Mehew 25', 40'; Price 78'		Rhodes 17'	Attendance: 1,091

=== Results table ===
Home \ Away	TOT	BAR	BID	BLA	BRI	CIN	CIR	EVE	FLE	HIG	LAR	MAN	MEL	MON	PAU	SLI	STR	THA	WIN	YAT
AFC Totton		5–0	4–0	0–1	2–1	1–2	0–2	1–3	5–3	3–1	1–2	2–1	5–0	1–0	5–2	2–1	2–0	0–3	1–1	1–1
Barnstaple Town	0–4		1–4	0–3	1–2	0–2	0–5	1–3	4–1	1–3	0–2	2–2	0–1	1–3	3–0	1–2	2–4	1–2	3–2	2–1
Bideford	3–2	1–0		0–1	3–1	0–1	4–0	3–1	2–1	1–0	1–1	0–0	1–1	1–3	3–2	2–0	0–1	0–1	1–0	3–1
Blackfield & Langley	1–1	3–1	4–1		3–0	1–0	2–0	4–0	4–1	3–0	4–1	3–0	3–2	1–2	0–0	1–0	2–1	3–0	0–4	1–2
Bristol Manor Farm	1–2	4–1	4–3	1–0		1–3	1–4	2–1	4–1	1–2	3–3	1–2	2–3	2–1	1–2	3–0	1–1	3–2	3–1	2–4
Cinderford Town	0–1	6–0	4–2	2–1	4–2		1–1	0–1	1–2	3–1	2–0	0–1	1–0	1–1	3–1	1–0	1–0	1–1	0–0	5–1
Cirencester Town	1–1	4–1	8–2	2–3	5–0	0–1		2–0	4–0	3–2	4–1	6–1	4–0	2–2	3–5	3–3	5–0	6–2	4–2	1–2
Evesham United	4–3	1–0	1–3	2–1	2–2	2–1	0–2		4–0	4–4	1–1	3–2	3–0	3–1	1–0	2–0	1–1	1–2	0–2	1–2
Fleet Town	2–5	4–3	3–2	0–2	2–2	0–2	1–4	1–4		3–4	1–2	1–2	0–3	1–5	2–3	0–3	1–3	1–2	1–2	2–1
Highworth Town	1–0	1–1	3–4	2–2	4–0	0–1	0–3	1–7	4–2		0–2	1–1	3–1	1–1	1–0	4–0	1–0	5–0	1–4	1–4
Larkhall Athletic	1–0	0–0	2–3	0–2	2–0	2–3	1–2	0–1	3–1	1–0		3–2	0–1	1–2	3–1	2–1	0–2	2–0	0–1	2–1
Mangotsfield United	3–0	4–0	0–2	1–2	0–2	5–0	1–5	0–0	5–3	0–1	3–1		1–2	0–4	4–1	2–3	1–2	1–2	1–2	1–3
Melksham Town	0–3	3–0	2–1	2–3	2–2	3–2	0–1	1–0	2–1	3–2	1–1	2–1		1–3	0–4	1–0	5–3	1–2	1–4	0–2
Moneyfields	2–0	3–1	2–1	0–1	1–0	1–0	2–1	1–0	4–1	2–1	0–1	3–1	3–3		5–1	1–0	2–2	0–0	0–2	1–2
Paulton Rovers	1–4	1–4	1–2	1–2	1–2	0–1	0–3	0–2	4–1	2–2	1–3	4–2	0–1	1–0		2–1	2–4	0–1	0–1	1–0
Slimbridge	4–3	2–2	3–2	0–4	3–3	1–3	2–2	0–1	1–3	0–0	1–1	1–8	1–3	2–4	1–0		1–2	1–0	1–3	1–4
Street	1–0	1–1	4–1	0–0	0–0	0–0	2–1	1–1	3–0	2–2	1–4	2–0	3–1	2–0	2–2	3–1		1–2	0–2	3–0
Thatcham Town	3–0	3–2	1–2	1–0	2–1	3–3	1–2	4–2	6–0	2–3	3–1	1–2	0–3	0–2	1–0	0–1	0–1		1–1	0–1
Winchester City	2–1	7–0	2–2	3–0	1–3	2–2	3–2	1–2	3–0	1–1	1–0	4–0	2–2	0–3	2–3	6–1	5–0	3–2		0–1
Yate Town	1–1	1–2	2–0	1–4	3–2	1–1	2–1	3–1	4–1	3–0	0–0	4–3	3–2	2–2	3–0	3–0	1–0	1–1	3–2	

Source: SFL official site
Legend: Blue = home team win; Yellow = draw; Red = away team win.

=== Stadia and locations ===
Locations of Division One South clubs

Club	Stadium	Capacity
AFC Totton	Testwood Stadium	3,000
Barnstaple Town	Mill Road	5,000
Bideford	The Sports Ground	2,000
Blackfield & Langley	Gang Warily Rec	1,500
Bristol Manor Farm	The Creek	2,000
Cinderford Town	Causeway Ground	3,500
Cirencester Town	Corinium Stadium	4,500
Evesham United	Jubilee Stadium	3,000
Fleet Town	Calthorpe Park	2,000
Highworth Town	The Elms Recreation Ground	2,000
Larkhall Athletic	The Plain Ham Ground	1,000
Mangotsfield United	Cossham Street	2,500
Melksham Town	Oakfield Stadium	2,500
Moneyfields	Moneyfields Sports Ground	2,000
Paulton Rovers	Athletic Field	2,500
Slimbridge	Thornhill Park	1,500
Street	The Tannery	1,000
Thatcham Town	Waterside Park	1,500
Winchester City	The City Ground	4,500
Yate Town	Lodge Road	2,000

== Step 4 play-off winners rating ==
Club	League	PPG	GD	Qualification
Bromsgrove Sporting	Southern Football League Division One Central	2.29	64	Promoted to Step 3
Horsham	Isthmian League South East Division	2.06	35	Promoted to Step 3
Cheshunt	Isthmian League South Central Division	2	36	Promoted to Step 3
Radcliffe	Northern Premier League Division One West	1.97	39	Promoted to Step 3
Yate Town	Southern Football League Division One South	1.97	23	Promoted to Step 3
Heybridge Swifts	Isthmian League North Division	1.95	19	Retained at Step 4
Brighouse Town	Northern Premier League Division One East	1.87	31	Retained at Step 4

== League Cup ==
2018–19 Southern League Cup
Tournament details
- Country: England; Wales
- Teams: 84

Final positions
- Champions: Stratford Town
- Runners-up: Cinderford Town

Tournament statistics
- Matches played: 83

The 2018–19 Southern League Cup was the 81st edition of the Southern League Cup, the cup competition of the Southern Football League.

=== Calendar ===
Round	Dates	Matches	Clubs
Preliminary round	3 September to 18 September	20	84 → 64
First round	2 October to 11 December	32	64 → 32
Second round	5 November to 22 January	16	32 → 16
Third round	4 December to 5 February	8	16 → 8
Quarterfinals	8 January to 2 April	4	8 → 4
Semifinals	9 April	2	4 → 2
Final	16 April	1	2 → 1

=== Preliminary round ===
Tie	Home team (tier)	Score	Away team (tier)	Att.
1	Coleshill Town (1C)	1–1	Sutton Coldfield Town (1C)	97
Coleshill Town advance 3–1 on penalties
2	Alvechurch (PC)	1–0	Bromsgrove Sporting (1C)	361
3	Fleet Town (1S)	1–3	Farnborough (PS)	143
4	Kings Langley (PS)	0–1	Welwyn Garden City (1C)	82
5	Leiston (PC)	1–0	Cambridge City (1C)	122
6	Mangotsfield United (1S)	1–2	Larkhall Athletic (1S)	73
7	North Leigh (1C)	1–5	Banbury United (PC)	105
8	Redditch United (PC)	4–3	Rushall Olympic (PC)	101
9	St Neots Town (PC)	2–2	Bedford Town (1C)	175
St Neots Town advance 4–1 on penalties
10	Tamworth (PC)	6–0	Coalville Town (PC)	332
11	Taunton Town (PS)	2–5	Street (1S)	264

Tie	Home team (tier)	Score	Away team (tier)	Att.
12	Walton Casuals (PS)	2–1	Beaconsfield Town (PS)	98
13	Winchester City (1S)	1–1	Gosport Borough (PS)	106
Gosport Borough advance 4–2 on penalties
14	Yaxley (1C)	2–2	St Ives Town (PC)	57
Yaxley advance 2–0 on penalties
15	Hitchin Town (PC)	2–2	Harrow Borough (PS)	119
Hitchin Town advance 4–2 on penalties
16	Chesham United (PS)	5–3	Dunstable Town (1C)	74
17	Didcot Town (1C)	5–3	Thame United (1C)	67
18	Corby Town (1C)	2–3	Peterborough Sports (1C)	203
19	Kempston Rovers (1C)	3–1	AFC Dunstable (1C)	57
20	Swindon Supermarine (PS)	4–1	Yate Town (1S)	137

=== First round ===
Tie	Home team (tier)	Score	Away team (tier)	Att.
21	AFC Totton (1S)	3–1	Moneyfields (1S)	127
22	Aylesbury (1C)	0–3	Berkhamsted (1C)	60
23	Aylesbury United (1C)	3–1	Chesham United (PS)	132
24	Banbury United (PC)	2–3	Kettering Town (PC)	185
25	Bedworth United (PC)	0–0	Barwell (PC)	83
Barwell advance 6–5 on penalties
26	Bristol Manor Farm (1S)	2–4	Cinderford Town (1S)	101
27	Didcot Town (1C)	1–0	Kidlington (1C)	77
28	Dorchester Town (PS)	1–1	Poole Town (PS)	227
Poole Town advance 4–2 on penalties
29	Frome Town (PS)	0–2	Paulton Rovers (1S)	107
30	Gosport Borough (PS)	3–4	Blackfield & Langley (1S)	89
31	Kempston Rovers (1C)	2–2	AFC Rushden & Diamonds (PC)	123
Kempston Rovers advance 3–1 on penalties
32	King's Lynn Town (PC)	4–1	Peterborough Sports (1C)	160
33	Leiston (PC)	1–1	Needham Market (PC)	108
Leiston advance 4–2 on penalties
34	Lowestoft Town (PC)	3–1	St Neots Town (PC)	58
35	Royston Town (PC)	4–3	Hitchin Town (PC)	96
36	Swindon Supermarine (PS)	1–3	Cirencester Town (1S)	102

Tie	Home team (tier)	Score	Away team (tier)	Att.
37	Tamworth (PC)	1–1	Coleshill Town (1C)	280
Coleshill Town advance 6–5 on penalties
38	Tiverton Town (PS)	2–1	Barnstaple Town (1S)	108
39	Walton Casuals (PS)	6–0	Staines Town (PS)	108
40	Welwyn Garden City (1C)	2–1	Barton Rovers (1C)	51
41	Wimborne Town (PS)	2–0	Weymouth (PS)	208
42	Yaxley (1C)	0–9	Biggleswade Town (PC)	65
43	Evesham United (1S)	2–3	Stourbridge (PC)	96
44	Highworth Town (1S)	0–0	Salisbury (PS)	136
Salisbury advance 5–4 on penalties
45	Larkhall Athletic (1S)	0–2	Melksham Town (1S)	85
46	Redditch United (PC)	2–1	Halesowen Town (PC)	135
47	Slimbridge (1S)	5–1	Merthyr Town (PS)	72
48	Alvechurch (PC)	2–4	Stratford Town (PC)	108
49	Metropolitan Police (PS)	1–0	Hendon (PS)	59
50	Street (1S)	1–2	Bideford (1S)	98
51	Thatcham Town (1S)	0–0	Hartley Wintney (PS)	138
Hartley Wintney advance 9–8 on penalties
52	Basingstoke Town (PS)	W.O.	Farnborough (PS)	

=== Second round ===
Tie	Home team (tier)	Score	Away team (tier)	Att.
53	Coleshill Town (1C)	0–0	Barwell (PC)	69
Barwell advance 4–3 on penalties
54	Stourbridge (PC)	2–3	Cinderford Town (1S)	197
55	Berkhamsted (1C)	2–0	Aylesbury United (1C)	101
56	Blackfield & Langley (1S)	4–0	AFC Totton (1S)	118
57	Didcot Town (1C)	3–0	Cirencester Town (1S)	85
58	Kettering Town (PC)	5–1	King's Lynn Town (PC)	158
59	Leiston (PC)	0–1	Lowestoft Town (PC)	173
60	Melksham Town (1S)	0–4	Slimbridge (1S)	125

Tie	Home team (tier)	Score	Away team (tier)	Att.
61	Salisbury (PS)	2–0	Paulton Rovers (1S)	300
62	Stratford Town (PC)	2–1	Redditch United (PC)	163
63	Tiverton Town (PS)	2–5	Bideford (1S)	102
64	Metropolitan Police (PS)	1–5	Hartley Wintney (PS)	47
65	Welwyn Garden City (1C)	8–0	Kempston Rovers (1C)	65
66	Wimborne Town (PS)	3–0	Poole Town (PS)	221
67	Basingstoke Town (PS)	2–1	Walton Casuals (PS)	141
68	Royston Town (PC)	4–1	Biggleswade Town (PC)	110

=== Third round ===
Tie	Home team (tier)	Score	Away team (tier)	Att.
69	Berkhamsted (1C)	0–0	Welwyn Garden City (1C)	68
Berkhamsted advance 4–2 on penalties
70	Cinderford Town (1S)	4–2	Slimbridge (1S)	64
71	Didcot Town (1C)	1–1	Stratford Town (PC)	98
Stratford Town advance 4–2 on penalties
72	Kettering Town (PC)	1–1	Barwell (PC)	111
Kettering Town advance 4–2 on penalties

Tie	Home team (tier)	Score	Away team (tier)	Att.
73	Wimborne Town (PS)	1–2	Bideford (1S)	127
74	Basingstoke Town (PS)	1–4	Hartley Wintney (PS)	178
75	Salisbury (PS)	1–3	Blackfield & Langley (1S)	227
76	Royston Town (PC)	4–4	Lowestoft Town (PC)	104
Royston Town won 3–1 on penalties, but later Royston expelled and Lowestoft reinstalled

=== Quarter-finals ===
Tie	Home team (tier)	Score	Away team (tier)	Att.
77	Cinderford Town (1S)	2–2	Bideford (1S)	75
Cinderford Town advance 4–3 on penalties
78	Stratford Town (PC)	3–3	Kettering Town (PC)	116
Stratford Town advance 4–1 on penalties

Tie	Home team (tier)	Score	Away team (tier)	Att.
79	Hartley Wintney (PS)	0–1	Blackfield & Langley (1S)	55
80	Lowestoft Town (PC)	1–0	Berkhamsted (1C)	184

=== Semi-finals ===
Tie	Home team (tier)	Score	Away team (tier)	Att.
81	Cinderford Town (1S)	3–2	Blackfield & Langley (1S)	91
82	Stratford Town (PC)	3–2	Lowestoft Town (PC)	143

=== Final ===
16 April	Stratford Town (PC)	1–0	Cinderford Town (1S)	Tiddington
19:45	Isaak 61'	Southern League report		Stadium: Knights Lane; Attendance: 349

== See also ==
- Southern Football League
- 2018–19 Isthmian League
- 2018–19 Northern Premier League
