= Kidlington F.C. =

Association football club in England

Coordinates: 51°49′01.46″N 1°17′23.96″W

Kidlington
- Full name: Kidlington Football Club
- Nickname: The Greens
- Founded: 1909
- Ground: Yarnton Road, Kidlington
- Capacity: 1,500
- Chairman: Alan Spence
- Manager: Michael Hopkins
- League: Combined Counties League Premier Division North
- 2025–26: Combined Counties League Premier Division North, 9th of 20
- Website: kidlingtonfootballclub.com
Home colours	Away colours

Kidlington Football Club is a football club based in Kidlington, Oxfordshire, England. They are currently members of the Combined Counties League Premier Division North and play at Yarnton Road.

== History ==
The club was established in 1909. They initially played in village leagues and won the Lord Jersey Cup in 1929, beating Fritwell 2–1 in the final. In 1945 the club joined the Oxford City Junior League, before progressing to the Oxfordshire Senior League in 1951. They were champions of the league in 1952–53 and moved up to the Hellenic League in 1954. When the league gained a second division in 1956, the club were placed in the Premier Division.

In 1961–62 Kidlington finishing second-from-bottom of the Premier Division and were relegated to Division One. They were Division One runners-up in 1963–64, earning promotion back to the Premier Division. However, they were relegated again two seasons later. League reorganisation saw them placed in Division One B in 1971–72, before it reverted to a single division the following season. The club won the Division One Cup in 1974–75, and after finishing as Division One runners-up in 1978–79, they were promoted back to the Premier Division. However, the club finished bottom of the Premier Division in 1981–82, resulting in relegation to Division One.

In 2000 Division One was split into regional sections, with Kidlington placed in Division One West. A third-place finish in 2004–05 saw them promoted to the Premier Division. They won the league's Floodlit Cup in 2007–08 and the Supplmentary Cup in 2010–11. After finishing the 2015–16 season as Premier Division champions, the club were promoted to Division One East of the Southern League. At the end of the following season they were transferred to Division One West. The club were transferred to the newly formed Division One Central for the 2018–19 season.

Kidlington finished second-from-bottom of Division One Central of the Southern League in 2024–25 and were relegated to the Premier Division North of the Combined Counties League. In 2025–26 they won the Oxfordshire Senior Cup for the first time, beating Oxford City 4–0 in the final.

== Honours ==
- Hellenic League
  - Premier Division champions 2015–16
  - Supplementary Cup winners 2010–11
  - Floodlit Cup winners 2007–08
  - Division One Cup winners 1974–75
- Oxfordshire Senior League
  - Champions 1952–53
- Oxfordshire Senior Cup
  - Winners 2025–26
- Oxfordshire Intermediate Cup
  - Winners 1952–53, 1969–70, 1984–85
- Lord Jersey Cup
  - Winners 1928–29

== Records ==
- Best FA Cup performance: Second qualifying round 2015–16, 2017–18, 2019–20, 2020–21
- Best FA Trophy performance: Third qualifying round, 2020–21
- Best FA Vase performance: Quarter-finals, 2015–16
- Record attendance: 2,000 vs Showbiz XI, friendly match, 1973

== See also ==
- Kidlington F.C. players
