= 2014–15 Northern Premier League =

The 2014–15 season was the 47th season of the Northern Premier League Premier Division, and the eighth season of the Northern Premier League Division One North and South. The league sponsors for 2014–15 were Evo-Stik.

== Premier Division ==
Northern Premier League Premier Division
- Season: 2014–15
- Champions: F.C. United of Manchester
- Promoted: Curzon Ashton; F.C. United of Manchester
- Relegated: Belper Town; Trafford; Witton Albion
- Top goalscorer: Aaron Williams (28 goals)
- Biggest home win: Ilkeston 6–0 Trafford (23 August 2014)
- Biggest away win: Grantham Town 1–7 Blyth Spartans (20 December 2014)
- Highest scoring: Stourbridge 5–3 Nantwich Town (2 September 2014); Grantham Town 1–7 Blyth Spartans (20 December 2014)
- Highest attendance: 3,588; F.C. United of Manchester 1–0 Stourbridge F.C. (21 April 2015)
- Lowest attendance: 101; Nantwich Town 2–0 Barwell (9 December 2014); Barwell 2–1 Marine (13 December 2014)

The Premier Division featured six new teams:

- Belper Town, promoted via play-offs from NPL Division One South
- Curzon Ashton, promoted as champions of NPL Division One North
- Halesowen Town, promoted as champions of NPL Division One South
- Ramsbottom United, promoted via play-offs from NPL Division One North
- Stourbridge, transferred from the Southern League Premier Division
- Workington, relegated from Conference North

=== League table ===
Pos	Team	Pld	W	D	L	GF	GA	GD	Pts	Qualification or relegation
1	F.C. United of Manchester (C, P)	46	26	14	6	78	37	+41	92	Promotion to National League North
2	Workington	46	27	9	10	63	39	+24	90	Qualification for the playoffs
3	Ashton United	46	24	12	10	75	54	+21	84	Qualification for the playoffs
4	Curzon Ashton (O, P)	46	23	14	9	79	46	+33	83	Qualification for the playoffs, then promoted to the National League North
5	Ilkeston	46	22	15	9	79	56	+23	81	Qualification for the playoffs
6	Blyth Spartans	46	21	16	9	84	54	+30	79	
7	Skelmersdale United	46	21	10	15	58	48	+10	73	
8	Barwell	46	21	10	15	69	63	+6	73	
9	Rushall Olympic	46	21	9	16	76	64	+12	72	
10	Buxton	46	18	17	11	70	57	+13	71	
11	Halesowen Town	46	13	20	13	56	48	+8	59	
12	Grantham Town	46	15	14	17	64	72	−8	59	
13	Whitby Town	46	14	16	16	56	63	−7	58	
14	Matlock Town	46	15	11	20	57	60	−3	56	
15	Nantwich Town	46	16	7	23	61	76	−15	55	
16	Stourbridge	46	14	11	21	59	72	−13	53	
17	Ramsbottom United	46	15	8	23	66	80	−14	53	
18	King's Lynn Town	46	14	10	22	60	81	−21	52	Transferred to the Southern League Premier Division
19	Frickley Athletic	46	12	14	20	60	73	−13	50	
20	Stamford	46	13	11	22	56	75	−19	50	
21	Marine	46	11	16	19	58	69	−11	49	Reprieved from relegation (Note: The level 6 was one team short after Salisbury City from Conference South demised. Marine reprieved from relegation, as the best of Level 7 teams finished in the relegation zone.)
22	Witton Albion (R)	46	14	7	25	58	86	−28	49	Relegation to NPL Division One North
23	Trafford (R)	46	6	15	25	58	93	−35	33	Relegation to NPL Division One North
24	Belper Town (R)	46	6	14	26	62	96	−34	32	Relegation to NPL Division One South

Updated to match(es) played on 25 April 2015. Source:
Rules for classification: 1) points; 2) goal difference; 3) number of goals scored.
(C) Champions; (O) Play-off winners; (P) Promoted; (R) Relegated

=== Play-offs ===
Semifinals
2	Workington	0
5	Ilkeston	1
3	Ashton United	1 (2)
4	Curzon Ashton	1 (4)

Final
4	Curzon Ashton	1
5	Ilkeston	0

==== Semi-finals ====
28 April 2015	Workington	0–1	Ilkeston	Borough Park, Workington
19:45			Richards 56'	Attendance: 1,391

28 April 2015	Ashton United	1–1 (a.e.t.) (2–4 p)	Curzon Ashton	Hurst Cross, Ashton-under-Lyne
19:45	Baguley 7'		Brooke 80'	Attendance: 1,049
	Penalties
	(penalty scored) Johnson; (penalty missed) Young; (penalty missed) Leadbitter; (penalty scored) Gee		(penalty scored) Thornton; (penalty missed) Hunt; (penalty scored) Walker; (penalty scored) Guest; (penalty scored) Stott

==== Final ====
2 May 2015	Curzon Ashton	1–0	Ilkeston	Tameside Stadium, Ashton-under-Lyne
15:00	Woodford 18'			Attendance: 1,212

=== Results ===
Home \ Away	ASH	BAR	BLP	BLY	BUX	CZA	FCU	FRK	GRN	HAL	ILK	KLT	MAR	MAT	NAN	RAM	RSO	SKU	STM	STB	TRA	WTB	WTN	WRK
Ashton United		3–1	4–3	3–0	1–1	2–2	0–2	2–2	2–0	1–0	0–2	3–1	2–2	2–0	3–1	1–0	1–2	1–0	0–1	3–0	1–1	1–0	2–1	3–2
Barwell	1–0		1–0	2–1	1–2	1–1	0–0	2–2	3–0	0–1	2–1	4–3	2–1	1–3	3–2	3–4	3–1	2–0	1–0	2–2	2–0	1–0	0–2	1–2
Belper Town	2–2	2–2		3–4	1–1	2–0	1–3	2–0	1–2	2–1	2–3	3–3	2–2	3–3	1–4	1–2	0–3	1–1	2–3	0–4	2–0	0–2	5–0	1–2
Blyth Spartans	1–1	1–1	2–0		0–1	2–1	0–1	1–1	2–1	2–1	0–1	3–2	1–2	0–0	2–1	4–0	3–3	1–1	4–1	2–0	1–0	2–2	2–1	1–0
Buxton	2–3	1–1	5–1	2–3		2–1	1–1	4–0	5–1	2–1	1–1	1–1	1–1	3–2	0–1	1–1	0–3	1–2	1–2	4–1	3–2	1–1	0–3	1–1
Curzon Ashton	3–2	4–1	2–2	1–1	0–0		0–4	3–0	2–4	4–1	4–0	4–0	1–0	3–0	0–1	1–0	2–3	2–0	3–1	3–0	2–1	3–0	2–1	0–0
F.C. United of Manchester	3–0	3–1	2–2	0–0	1–1	1–1		3–2	3–1	1–0	2–2	3–1	5–2	0–0	2–1	3–1	1–0	1–2	3–1	1–0	3–0	2–0	4–0	1–0
Frickley Athletic	1–3	1–3	2–0	2–1	1–1	1–1	4–1		2–4	1–1	0–2	1–1	1–0	1–0	0–1	4–2	1–1	0–1	0–2	1–0	4–0	1–1	2–3	1–2
Grantham Town	0–0	1–1	1–0	1–7	3–1	1–1	1–2	1–1		0–2	1–0	3–3	1–1	2–1	4–0	0–1	0–1	1–1	1–4	1–1	4–3	0–1	3–1	1–0
Halesowen Town	2–3	4–1	1–1	1–2	2–1	0–0	0–1	1–1	1–1		0–0	1–1	0–2	4–3	1–1	2–0	3–0	2–0	1–1	2–0	1–1	3–3	1–0	0–1
Ilkeston	0–0	2–1	1–0	1–1	0–0	1–1	3–1	1–0	1–1	2–2		3–3	1–0	1–0	2–1	2–4	2–1	2–0	1–2	3–4	6–0	1–1	1–1	0–3
King's Lynn Town	1–1	0–1	1–0	1–3	1–2	1–3	1–2	2–1	1–0	0–0	3–0		3–1	1–3	2–1	2–1	0–4	0–3	1–0	1–0	0–1	0–1	2–0	1–2
Marine	1–0	2–0	2–2	3–3	1–2	1–1	0–0	2–0	2–2	1–1	1–2	1–2		0–2	0–1	1–3	2–1	1–0	2–0	1–1	2–2	2–1	0–1	0–1
Matlock Town	0–1	3–1	3–1	1–1	0–0	0–3	0–0	3–0	0–2	0–4	0–0	3–1	3–2		2–1	1–1	1–2	1–1	1–2	4–1	2–4	0–1	3–0	0–1
Nantwich Town	1–3	2–0	2–1	1–1	1–1	1–2	1–2	3–2	0–3	1–0	1–1	2–1	2–1	3–0		3–2	0–1	0–1	0–3	2–3	0–0	2–1	3–0	2–3
Ramsbottom United	0–3	0–1	4–2	3–3	2–0	1–1	0–2	0–0	3–1	1–1	1–2	2–3	3–2	0–1	1–4		2–3	0–3	3–1	0–1	1–2	4–0	3–2	1–1
Rushall Olympic	1–2	0–3	2–1	1–2	3–0	2–1	1–1	1–3	0–0	1–1	1–3	3–1	1–1	1–0	2–1	2–4		0–0	0–0	3–0	6–1	1–5	2–1	3–0
Skelmersdale United	1–1	1–3	2–1	1–0	2–3	1–1	1–0	3–2	1–1	1–1	1–4	1–1	3–1	0–1	1–0	3–0	1–2		0–3	2–1	3–0	4–0	1–0	1–0
Stamford	0–2	0–2	0–1	1–1	1–3	0–1	1–1	1–3	1–1	1–2	0–4	2–1	0–1	0–1	2–2	1–1	3–0	1–3		2–3	3–3	1–1	3–2	2–1
Stourbridge	1–1	0–2	4–0	0–3	0–3	0–1	2–1	2–1	1–2	1–1	3–3	3–0	2–2	1–0	5–3	1–2	0–0	1–0	1–1		1–1	2–1	3–0	0–1
Trafford	1–2	1–1	2–2	1–4	0–1	0–1	1–1	2–3	3–1	0–2	2–4	1–3	2–3	0–0	4–0	0–1	0–3	0–1	2–2	2–2		3–3	1–1	2–3
Whitby Town	2–0	0–1	3–3	1–0	0–1	0–1	0–4	1–1	2–1	0–0	1–3	2–2	2–2	1–1	3–1	2–0	2–1	0–2	3–0	1–0	1–1		1–1	0–0
Witton Albion	5–2	2–2	0–0	1–5	1–1	1–3	0–0	1–2	1–3	2–0	1–4	0–1	3–1	1–3	3–0	2–1	3–2	2–0	3–0	2–1	0–5	0–3		1–2
Workington	1–2	2–1	3–0	1–1	1–2	3–2	1–0	1–1	2–1	0–0	2–0	2–0	0–0	2–1	0–0	1–0	3–2	2–1	2–0	1–0	1–0	3–0	1–2	

Updated to match(es) played on 25 April 2015. Source: NPL Premier Division results grid
Legend: Blue = home team win; Yellow = draw; Red = away team win.

=== Stadia and locations ===
Locations of the 2014–15 Northern Premier League Premier Division teams

Team	Stadium	Capacity
Grantham Town	South Kesteven Sports Stadium	7,500
F.C. United of Manchester	Bower Fold and Tameside Stadium (groundsharing)	4,000–6,500
King's Lynn Town	The Walks	5,733
Buxton	The Silverlands	5,200
Halesowen Town	The Grove	5,000
Witton Albion	Wincham Park	4,813
Ashton United	Hurst Cross	4,500
Blyth Spartans	Croft Park	4,435
Curzon Ashton	Tameside Stadium	4,000
Ilkeston	New Manor Ground	3,500
Nantwich Town	The Weaver Stadium	3,500
Whitby Town	Turnbull Ground	3,500
Workington	Borough Park	3,101
Marine	The Arriva Stadium	2,800
Barwell	Kirkby Road	2,500
Skelmersdale United	West Lancashire College Stadium	2,500
Trafford	Shawe View	2,500
Belper Town	Christchurch Meadow	2,400
Matlock Town	Causeway Lane	2,214
Frickley Athletic	Westfield Lane	2,087
Stourbridge	War Memorial Athletic Ground	2,014
Ramsbottom United	The Harry Williams Riverside	2,000
Stamford	Kettering Road	2,000
Rushall Olympic	Dales Lane	1,400

== Division One North ==
Northern Premier League Division One North
- Season: 2014–15
- Champions: Salford City
- Promoted: Darlington 1883; Salford City
- Relegated: Padiham
- Matches: 462
- Goals: 1,554 (3.36 per match)
- Top goalscorer: Nathan Cartman 35
- Biggest home win: Darlington 1883 7–0 Kendal Town (25 August 2014)
- Biggest away win: Bamber Bridge 1–7 Droylsden (16 August 2014); Padiham 0–6 Salford City (25 February 2015); Prescot Cables 0–6 Clitheroe (20 December 2014)
- Highest scoring: Spennymoor Town 8–3 Clitheroe (14 March 2014) (11 goals)
- Highest attendance: 1,882; Spennymoor Town 0-2 Darlington 1883 (19 August 2014)
- Lowest attendance: 58; Harrogate RA 1–0 Clitheroe (8 September 2014)

Division One North featured four new teams:

- Brighouse Town, promoted as champions from the Northern Counties East League Premier Division
- Spennymoor Town, promoted as champions from the Northern League Division One
- Droylsden, relegated from the NPL Premier Division
- Scarborough Athletic, transferred from the NPL Division One South

=== League table ===
Pos	Team	Pld	W	D	L	GF	GA	GD	Pts	Qualification or relegation
1	Salford City (C, P)	42	30	5	7	92	42	+50	95	Promotion to NPL Premier Division
2	Darlington 1883 (O, P)	42	28	7	7	99	37	+62	91	Qualification for Play-offs
3	Bamber Bridge	42	25	8	9	88	58	+30	83	Qualification for Play-offs
4	Northwich Victoria	42	25	7	10	75	39	+36	82	Qualification for Play-offs
5	Spennymoor Town	42	22	11	9	76	45	+31	77	Qualification for Play-offs
6	Scarborough Athletic	42	23	6	13	80	61	+19	75	
7	Mossley	42	23	6	13	79	63	+16	75	
8	Harrogate Railway Athletic	42	19	10	13	85	75	+10	67	
9	Warrington Town	42	19	8	15	65	55	+10	65	
10	Droylsden	42	20	3	19	98	84	+14	63	
11	Lancaster City	42	18	8	16	65	53	+12	62	
12	Farsley	42	18	7	17	73	64	+9	61	
13	Clitheroe	42	14	10	18	73	81	−8	52	
14	Brighouse Town	42	14	9	19	64	81	−17	51	
15	Burscough	42	12	12	18	62	73	−11	48	
16	Kendal Town	42	12	10	20	81	92	−11	46	
17	Ossett Albion	42	13	7	22	49	72	−23	43 (Note: Ossett Albion were deducted 3 points.)	
18	Ossett Town	42	12	6	24	48	83	−35	42	
19	Radcliffe Borough	42	8	11	23	49	91	−42	35	
20	Prescot Cables	42	7	12	23	47	86	−39	33	
21	New Mills	42	6	7	29	56	107	−51	25	Reprieved from relegation
22	Padiham (R)	42	6	6	30	50	112	−62	24	Relegation to NWCFL Premier Division

Updated to match(es) played on 25 April 2015. Source:
Rules for classification: 1) points; 2) goal difference; 3) number of goals scored.
(C) Champions; (O) Play-off winners; (P) Promoted; (R) Relegated

=== Play-offs ===
Semifinals
2	Darlington 1883	3
5	Spennymoor Town	2
3	Bamber Bridge (a.e.t.)	2
4	Northwich Victoria	1

Final
2	Darlington 1883	2
3	Bamber Bridge	0

==== Semi-finals ====
28 April 2015	Bamber Bridge	2–1 (a.e.t.)	Northwich Victoria	Sir Tom Finney Stadium, Bamber Bridge
19:45	Macken 43'; Linney 115'		Grayson 76'	Attendance: 550

29 April 2015	Darlington 1883	3–2	Spennymoor Town	Heritage Park, Bishop Auckland
19:45	Armstrong 43'; Hatch 79'; Dowson 89'		Tait 60'; Roberts 76'	Attendance: 1,987

==== Final ====
2 May 2015	Darlington 1883	2–0	Bamber Bridge	Heritage Park, Bishop Auckland
15:00	Cartman 52'; Armstrong 56'			Attendance: 1,876

=== Results ===
Home \ Away	BAM	BRT	BUR	CLT	DAR	DRO	FAR	HRA	KEN	LNC	MOS	NEM	NOR	OSA	OST	PAD	PRC	RAD	SLC	SCA	SPE	WAR
Bamber Bridge		4–2	2–1	3–1	1–2	1–7	3–1	1–2	3–2	3–3	1–0	2–1	2–0	3–1	4–1	3–1	2–0	1–1	1–2	0–0	2–1	3–1
Brighouse Town	2–3		0–1	2–4	1–3	1–3	1–0	1–4	3–1	1–3	3–2	4–3	2–2	1–1	2–1	3–1	6–3	2–1	3–1	0–4	1–4	0–0
Burscough	1–1	2–1		1–2	2–2	3–2	1–3	1–3	2–2	2–3	2–0	4–1	2–5	0–1	3–1	1–1	1–1	4–0	1–2	2–3	0–1	1–3
Clitheroe	1–2	2–2	1–1		2–1	3–2	0–0	2–1	6–4	0–1	0–1	2–2	3–1	1–1	3–2	1–4	3–3	1–1	2–1	0–1	0–2	2–1
Darlington 1883	2–1	2–0	3–0	1–1		5–2	1–1	7–1	7–0	3–0	3–1	3–1	0–1	2–0	5–0	1–0	4–2	2–2	0–1	3–0	1–0	2–0
Droylsden	4–3	0–0	1–2	2–0	2–1		0–2	6–1	4–1	2–0	2–4	0–1	0–2	5–3	4–1	5–1	4–1	4–2	3–2	1–2	0–0	3–1
Farsley	2–2	0–1	2–2	2–0	3–2	2–1		4–2	2–3	0–1	3–4	2–0	1–0	4–0	2–1	5–0	2–1	3–0	1–1	2–2	1–1	1–0
Harrogate Railway Athletic	1–1	1–1	4–0	1–0	1–5	4–3	2–4		0–0	3–0	5–5	3–0	2–1	2–1	4–0	2–0	1–2	0–1	1–0	3–0	1–1	1–2
Kendal Town	1–1	2–2	0–4	2–2	4–2	1–0	0–3	4–3		0–0	2–3	4–4	0–3	2–3	3–2	1–2	6–0	4–1	6–0	0–3	2–4	3–0
Lancaster City	1–0	2–0	4–1	1–3	0–0	4–0	3–0	0–1	2–3		4–1	4–0	0–1	1–0	0–2	3–3	3–0	3–1	0–2	1–2	1–4	1–1
Mossley	0–1	2–3	1–1	4–1	0–3	4–2	2–1	2–2	0–4	3–0		2–0	0–1	1–0	3–0	3–2	3–1	4–1	1–3	2–1	2–0	1–2
New Mills	1–4	1–4	1–2	3–3	1–5	2–3	2–1	1–2	2–0	1–4	1–3		1–2	1–2	1–2	3–2	0–2	2–2	0–3	3–3	2–3	0–3
Northwich Victoria	1–0	1–0	5–0	3–0	0–1	3–0	5–1	2–2	0–0	0–1	0–0	2–1		1–0	1–1	5–1	2–0	2–0	2–2	2–3	1–4	2–0
Ossett Albion	2–3	1–2	1–3	2–0	0–2	1–3	2–1	2–3	3–2	2–2	0–2	3–2	1–2		1–1	2–1	1–0	1–0	0–1	3–1	1–1	0–3
Ossett Town	0–2	3–2	2–2	2–1	0–2	2–0	1–2	3–1	2–2	2–1	0–1	5–0	0–2	0–3		1–0	1–0	0–1	0–3	3–1	1–3	0–2
Padiham	1–2	1–1	1–3	2–3	1–3	3–5	3–1	1–1	1–5	0–3	1–2	0–1	0–2	1–0	2–2		4–0	2–1	0–6	0–3	0–2	1–3
Prescot Cables	1–4	0–0	0–0	0–6	0–2	1–1	4–0	2–2	1–1	1–0	1–2	3–3	2–3	0–0	0–1	5–1		3–0	0–1	2–2	0–0	2–1
Radcliffe Borough	2–2	1–3	2–1	0–4	1–1	5–3	1–4	4–3	3–1	3–2	0–2	2–2	0–2	1–1	1–1	2–2	3–1		0–2	0–3	0–0	1–4
Salford City	3–0	2–0	1–0	2–1	2–0	2–1	3–2	1–4	2–1	0–2	2–2	2–0	2–1	4–0	5–0	5–1	6–1	2–1		4–1	2–0	2–2
Scarborough Athletic	1–2	4–0	2–0	2–1	1–2	1–2	3–1	3–2	2–1	0–0	2–1	3–2	1–2	2–0	2–0	6–1	2–1	2–0	1–3		1–0	2–4
Spennymoor Town	1–6	4–1	1–1	8–3	0–2	3–2	1–0	1–3	2–1	0–0	2–2	1–0	2–1	5–0	3–0	3–1	0–0	2–1	0–0	4–1		2–0
Warrington Town	0–3	1–0	1–1	4–2	1–1	3–4	2–1	0–0	3–0	2–1	0–1	1–3	1–1	0–3	3–1	3–0	2–0	3–0	0–2	1–1	1–0	

Updated to match(es) played on 25 April 2015. Source: NPL First Division North results grid
Legend: Blue = home team win; Yellow = draw; Red = away team win.

=== Stadia and locations ===
Locations of the 2013–14 Northern Premier League Division One North teams

Team	Stadium	Capacity
Mossley	Seel Park	4,000
Spennymoor Town	The Brewery Field	2,900
Farsley	Throstle Nest	3,900
Harrogate Railway Athletic	Station View	3,500
Lancaster City	Giant Axe	3,500
Radcliffe Borough	Stainton Park	3,500
Warrington Town	Cantilever Park	3,500
Prescot Cables	Valerie Park	3,200
Burscough	Victoria Park	3,054
Droylsden	Butcher's Arms Ground	3,000
Ossett Albion	WareHouse Systems Stadium	3,000
Scarborough Athletic	Queensgate	3,000
Kendal Town	Lakeland Radio Stadium	2,400
Bamber Bridge	QED Stadium	2,264
Clitheroe	Shawbridge	2,000
Northwich Victoria	Valley Road (former ground of Flixton)	2,000
Ossett Town	Ingfield	2,000
Darlington 1883	Heritage Park (groundshare with Bishop Auckland)	1,994
Padiham	Arbories Memorial Sports Ground	1,688
New Mills	Church Lane	1,400
Salford City	Moor Lane	1,400
Brighouse Town	St Giles' Road	1,000

== Division One South ==
Northern Premier League Division One South
- Season: 2014–15
- Champions: Mickleover Sports
- Promoted: Mickleover Sports; Sutton Coldfield Town
- Relegated: Rainworth Miners Welfare; Brigg Town
- Matches: 462
- Goals: 1,520 (3.29 per match)
- Top goalscorer: Jake Woolley 25
- Biggest home win: Gresley FC 10–0 Brigg Town
- Biggest away win: Loughborough Dynamo 0–6 Spalding United Loughborough Dynamo 1–7 Leek Town
- Highest scoring: Gresley FC 10–0 Brigg Town
- Highest attendance: Stafford Rangers 1-0 Gresley FC 807
- Lowest attendance: Romulus 1–2 Brigg Town 31

Division One South featured five new teams:

- Norton United, promoted as champions from the North West Counties League Premier Division
- Spalding United, promoted as champions from the United Counties League Premier Division
- Tividale, promoted as champions from the Midland Alliance
- Stafford Rangers, relegated from the NPL Premier Division
- Stocksbridge Park Steels, relegated from the NPL Premier Division

=== League table ===
Pos	Team	Pld	W	D	L	GF	GA	GD	Pts	Qualification or relegation
1	Mickleover Sports (C, P)	42	31	5	6	105	40	+65	98	Promotion to NPL Premier Division
2	Leek Town	42	28	5	9	91	38	+53	89	Qualification for Play-offs
3	Newcastle Town	42	27	6	9	92	46	+46	87	Qualification for Play-offs
4	Sutton Coldfield Town (O, P)	42	25	8	9	75	41	+34	83	Qualification for Play-offs
5	Gresley	42	25	6	11	96	51	+45	81	Qualification for Play-offs
6	Stafford Rangers	42	23	12	7	68	33	+35	81	
7	Spalding United	42	23	10	9	84	41	+43	79	
8	Tividale	42	20	11	11	65	43	+22	71	
9	Lincoln United	42	19	9	14	72	55	+17	66	
10	Coalville Town	42	19	4	19	76	71	+5	61	
11	Norton United	42	19	4	19	79	75	+4	61	Club resigned and folded
12	Romulus	42	18	7	17	69	65	+4	61	
13	Chasetown	42	14	9	19	60	64	−4	51	
14	Loughborough Dynamo	42	13	9	20	71	87	−16	48	
15	Sheffield	42	14	6	22	74	93	−19	48	
16	Goole	42	12	10	20	53	66	−13	46	
17	Stocksbridge Park Steels	42	10	11	21	53	84	−31	41	
18	Carlton Town	42	11	6	25	52	79	−27	39	
19	Market Drayton Town	42	11	4	27	66	109	−43	37	
20	Kidsgrove Athletic	42	9	9	24	48	96	−48	36	
21	Rainworth Miners Welfare	42	8	6	28	46	91	−45	30	Resigned to NCEFL Premier Division of the National League System
22	Brigg Town	42	3	3	36	26	153	−127	12	Resigned to NCEFL Premier Division of the National League System

Updated to match(es) played on 22 April 2015. Source:
Rules for classification: 1) points; 2) goal difference; 3) number of goals scored.
(C) Champions; (O) Play-off winners; (P) Promoted

=== Play-offs ===
Semifinals
2	Leek Town	1
5	Gresley	0
3	Newcastle Town	1
4	Sutton Coldfield Town	3

Final
2	Leek Town	0
4	Sutton Coldfield Town	2

==== Semi-finals ====
28 April 2015	Newcastle Town	1–3	Sutton Coldfield Town	Lyme Valley Stadium, Newcastle-under-Lyme
19:45	France 62'		Richards 18'; O'Callaghan 60'; Nadat 84'	Attendance: 384

29 April 2015	Leek Town	1–0	Gresley	Harrison Park, Leek
19:45	Johnson 7'			Attendance: 873

==== Final ====
2 May 2015	Leek Town	0–2	Sutton Coldfield Town	Harrison Park, Leek
15:00			Taylor 60'; O'Callaghan 76'	Attendance: 1,237

=== Results ===
Home \ Away	BRG	CAR	CHA	COA	GOO	GRE	KID	LEE	LIN	LOU	MAR	MIC	NEW	NOR	RAI	ROM	SHE	SPA	STA	STO	SUT	TIV
Brigg Town		0–0	0–0	3–0	0–2	0–7	2–2	0–3	0–3	1–3	0–6	0–5	1–3	1–7	1–4	1–3	0–2	1–6	0–1	1–0	0–3	0–2
Carlton Town	3–1		1–0	0–1	3–0	2–2	3–1	0–2	0–1	1–3	2–1	0–3	3–2	1–3	2–1	0–1	1–4	1–1	1–3	2–0	0–1	1–2
Chasetown	3–0	0–3		4–1	3–2	2–1	2–2	2–3	2–1	3–1	5–3	0–4	1–1	0–1	2–1	0–4	1–2	1–1	0–2	4–0	1–1	0–0
Coalville Town	7–0	3–0	2–0		4–2	2–3	3–1	0–1	2–1	3–2	2–0	0–2	0–1	5–2	2–1	2–1	2–2	1–2	1–2	4–2	1–0	2–2
Goole	4–0	2–1	2–1	1–2		4–2	1–3	0–2	1–1	0–0	2–2	0–3	1–2	3–0	2–2	2–4	3–1	0–0	0–1	2–0	1–2	1–0
Gresley	10–0	1–0	2–1	2–1	2–0		4–0	2–0	4–1	4–0	2–0	1–6	2–0	3–1	4–2	1–1	5–2	1–0	1–1	2–0	0–0	1–1
Kidsgrove Athletic	7–2	2–4	2–0	1–0	0–0	0–5		1–3	0–2	0–0	0–0	0–2	1–6	0–2	0–1	1–0	1–1	0–1	0–6	1–2	2–0	1–1
Leek Town	6–0	2–3	2–0	2–0	1–1	1–0	3–1		0–2	1–2	6–1	4–1	3–0	1–0	6–0	0–2	2–2	1–1	2–0	0–0	6–1	2–0
Lincoln United	2–0	2–2	0–0	4–1	0–1	1–3	6–0	0–0		2–4	1–3	2–3	1–1	4–1	2–1	3–1	2–1	1–1	2–0	5–0	1–2	1–3
Loughborough Dynamo	9–0	3–2	3–2	2–2	4–0	2–4	5–1	1–7	1–2		0–2	2–3	0–4	2–0	1–1	1–2	4–1	0–6	2–2	0–2	0–5	1–3
Market Drayton Town	2–1	3–2	1–2	5–3	1–2	1–2	2–4	1–2	0–2	2–5		1–6	2–5	2–1	2–0	3–1	1–6	0–4	1–2	2–3	1–1	2–2
Mickleover Sports	1–0	3–1	2–1	0–1	1–0	2–1	2–3	5–1	2–2	7–1	3–0		1–0	3–1	2–0	2–0	1–1	2–1	2–0	6–0	1–0	0–1
Newcastle Town	7–1	3–0	2–1	2–0	2–0	2–0	3–1	1–0	1–0	1–0	5–3	1–2		2–2	4–1	2–2	2–0	3–1	0–2	2–3	0–2	2–1
Norton United	7–4	3–1	1–3	5–1	2–1	4–1	2–1	0–1	2–3	1–0	4–2	0–1	0–5		0–1	4–2	3–2	2–2	0–0	2–1	1–2	0–1
Rainworth Miners Welfare	4–2	0–0	1–2	1–1	1–1	0–1	3–4	0–1	0–2	1–2	4–3	2–2	0–1	0–2		0–2	2–3	1–4	1–3	1–2	2–1	1–2
Romulus	1–2	4–0	1–0	2–1	0–0	1–4	2–2	0–4	1–2	1–1	1–2	2–0	2–2	2–3	1–2		4–2	3–0	1–0	3–2	1–2	2–1
Sheffield	1–0	3–2	2–6	2–6	0–2	3–1	2–1	1–2	2–3	3–2	1–0	2–3	0–3	1–2	5–0	2–3		4–3	0–3	3–2	2–3	0–3
Spalding United	4–1	3–0	0–2	2–1	4–1	2–1	5–0	4–1	3–0	2–1	2–0	2–2	1–2	2–1	2–0	1–0	2–0		4–0	1–1	1–0	0–2
Stafford Rangers	3–0	1–1	2–1	0–2	3–3	1–0	4–0	1–0	0–0	1–1	4–1	3–1	2–2	1–0	3–0	1–1	0–0	0–0		4–0	1–0	0–0
Stocksbridge Park Steels	4–0	3–2	0–0	1–1	2–1	1–1	1–1	1–4	2–0	0–0	5–0	1–4	1–3	2–2	0–2	1–2	2–2	0–2	1–4		0–2	1–1
Sutton Coldfield Town	6–0	2–1	2–2	2–0	1–0	2–0	2–0	0–1	2–2	2–0	4–1	1–1	1–0	2–1	5–2	2–1	3–0	2–0	1–0	3–3		1–3
Tividale	2–0	3–0	2–0	3–0	3–2	1–3	1–0	1–2	2–0	0–0	0–1	1–3	1–2	3–4	1–1	4–1	2–1	1–1	0–1	2–1	1–1	

Updated to match(es) played on 25 April 2015. Source: NPL First Division South results grid
Legend: Blue = home team win; Yellow = draw; Red = away team win.

=== Stadia and locations ===
Locations of the 2014–15 Northern Premier League Division One South teams

Team	Stadium	Capacity
Brigg Town	The Hawthorns	4,000
Newcastle Town	Lyme Valley Stadium	4,000
Stafford Rangers	Marston Road	4,000
Leek Town	Harrison Park	3,600
Spalding United	Sir Halley Stewart Field	3,500
Stocksbridge Park Steels	Look Local Stadium	3,500
Goole	Victoria Pleasure Grounds	3,000
Tividale	The Beaches	3,000
Gresley	The Moat Ground	2,400
Chasetown	The Scholars Ground	2,000
Coalville Town	Owen Street Sports Ground	2,000
Kidsgrove Athletic	The Seddon Stadium	2,000
Lincoln United	Ashby Avenue	2,200
Rainworth Miners Welfare	Welfare Ground	2,000
Romulus	The Central Ground (Sutton Coldfield Town ground share)	2,000
Sheffield	Coach and Horses Ground	2,000
Sutton Coldfield Town	The Central Ground	2,000
Carlton Town	Bill Stokeld Stadium	1,500
Loughborough Dynamo	Nanpantan Sports Ground	1,500
Mickleover Sports	Raygar Stadium	1,500
Norton United	Norton Cricket Club & Miners Welfare Institute	1,500
Market Drayton Town	Greenfields Sports Ground	1,000

== Challenge Cup ==
2014–15 Northern Premier League Challenge Cup
The Doodson Sport Cup

Tournament details
- Country: England
- Teams: 68

Final positions
- Champions: Warrington Town
- Runners-up: Farsley

The 2014–15 Northern Premier League Challenge Cup is the 45th season of the Northern Premier League Challenge Cup, the main cup competition in the Northern Premier League. It will be sponsored by Doodson Sport for a fourth consecutive season. 68 clubs from England will enter the competition, beginning with the preliminary round on 1 September, and all ties will end will end after 90 minutes and conclude with penalties.

The defending champions are AFC Fylde, who defeated Skelmersdale United 1–0 in the 2014 Final. Fylde will be unable to defend their title as they were promoted to the Conference North through the play–offs.

=== Calendar ===
Round	Clubs remaining	Clubs involved	Winners from previous round	New entries this round	Scheduled playing date
Preliminary round	68	8	0	8	1 September–11 November 2014
First round	64	64	4	60	10–25 November 2014
Second round	32	32	32	none	1 December 2014 – 6 January 2015
Third round	16	16	16	none	6–27 January 2015
Quarter-finals	8	8	8	none	10–25 February 2015
Semi-finals	4	4	4	none	24 March–8 April 2015
Final	2	2	2	none	30 April 2015

=== Preliminary round ===
Eight teams from the Northern Premier League Division One North or Northern Premier League Division One South have to compete in the Preliminary round to win a place in the competition proper. The draw for this round was made on 23 July 2014.

1 September 2014	New Mills	0–1	Northwich Victoria	New Mills, Derbyshire
19:45		New Mills report Northwich Victoria report	Amis 68'	Stadium: Church Lane; Attendance: 68

2 September 2014	Loughborough Dynamo	4–2	Rainworth Miners Welfare	Loughborough, Leicestershire
19:45	Wood 9'; Norris 22'; Watson 27', 54'	Loughborough Dynamo report Rainworth Miners Welfare report	Gill 28'; Hewitt 72'	Stadium: Nanpantan Sports Ground; Attendance: 49

11 November 2014	Norton United	1–1 (5–6 p)	Tividale	Smallthorne, Staffordshire
19:45	Baker 90'	Tividale report	Edwards 55'	Stadium: Norton Cricket Club & Miners Welfare Institute; Attendance: 54
	Penalties
	Cropper (penalty scored); Beaumont (penalty missed); Sheldon (penalty scored); Smith (penalty missed); Lennon (penalty scored); Green (penalty scored); Bradbury (penalty scored); Hawthorne (penalty missed)		(penalty scored) Foster; (penalty scored) Downing; (penalty missed) Ashton; (penalty scored) Penney; (penalty missed) Smith; (penalty scored) Paskin; (penalty scored) Bellis; (penalty scored) Winwood

14 October 2014	Scarborough Athletic	1–1 (3–1 p)	Brigg Town	Bridlington, East Riding of Yorkshire
19:45	Evans 90'	Brigg Town report	Lightowler 62'	Stadium: Queensgate; Attendance: 123

=== First round ===
Teams that were not in the preliminary round from Northern Premier League Division One North or Northern Premier League Division One South entered at this stage as well as teams from the Northern Premier League Premier Division, along with the winners from the preliminary round. The draw for this round was made on 23 July 2014.

11 November 2014	Ashton United	1–1 (4–5 p)	Salford City	Ashton-under-Lyne, Greater Manchester
19:45	Mukendi 79'		Seddon 17'	Stadium: Hurst Cross; Attendance: 111

11 November 2014	Belper Town	3–1	Grantham Town	Belper, Derbyshire
19:45	Holden 9'; Cotton 71'; Burbeary 75'		Meadows 25'	Stadium: Christchurch Meadow; Attendance: 116

11 November 2014	Blyth Spartans	0–2	Frickley Athletic	Blyth, Northumberland
19:45			Thompson 15'; South 23'	Stadium: Croft Park; Attendance: 248

11 November 2014	Brighouse Town	2–1	Stocksbridge Park Steels	Brighouse, West Yorkshire
19:45	Matthews 75' (pen.); Law 83'		Biggins 24'	Stadium: St Giles' Road; Attendance: 85

11 November 2014	Carlton Town	0–4	Barwell	Nottingham, Nottinghamshire
19:45			Towers 8'; Nisevic 46', 68'; Charley 90'	Stadium: Bill Stokeld Stadium; Attendance: 66

11 November 2014	Coalville Town	1–1 (4–3 p)	Stamford	Coalville, Leicestershire
19:45	Kay 78'		Bettles 54'	Stadium: Owen Street Sports Ground; Attendance: 85

12 November 2014	Darlington 1883	3–3 (1–3 p)	Whitby Town	Bishop Auckland, County Durham
19:45	Pennal 20'; Williams 28' (o.g.); Stephenson 32'		Robinson 40' (pen.); Hopson 60'; Gardner 72'	Stadium: Heritage Park; Attendance: 165

11 November 2014	Droylsden	6–0	Trafford	Droylsden, Greater Manchester
19:45	Kilheeney 28' (pen.); Deegan 36'; Morning 45'; Moke 53', 82'; Brown 77'			Stadium: Butcher's Arms Ground; Attendance: 114

10 November 2014	Curzon Ashton	0–0 (4–3 p)	F.C. United of Manchester	Ashton-under-Lyne, Greater Manchester
19:45				Stadium: Tameside Stadium; Attendance: 415

11 November 2014	Gresley	4–2	Loughborough Dynamo	Church Gresley, Derbyshire
19:45	Peel 43'; Harrison 49'; King 63'; Riddell 90'		Way 9'; Harrison 67' (o.g.)	Stadium: Moat Ground; Attendance: 155

24 November 2014	Harrogate Railway Athletic	2–1	Goole	Harrogate, North Yorkshire
19:45	Cartman 89', 90'		Law 50'	Stadium: Station View; Attendance: 57

25 November 2014	Kendal Town	0–2	Marine	Kendal, Cumbria
19:45			Codling 40'; Clair 85'	Stadium: The Northgate Vehicle Hire Stadium; Attendance: 100

11 November 2014	King's Lynn Town	0–3	Lincoln United	King's Lynn, Norfolk
19:45			Brooks 13'; Cotton 49'; Asplin 76'	Stadium: The Walks; Attendance: 186

18 November 2014	Lancaster City	5–0	Clitheroe	Lancaster, Lancashire
19:45	Marshall 16'; Pearce 31'; Dodgson 38'; Winder 63'; Taylor 66'			Stadium: Giant Axe; Attendance: 85

11 November 2014	Market Drayton Town	1–3	Leek Town	Market Drayton, Shropshire
19:45	Bramall 84'		Grice 8'; Shotton 38' (pen.); Shelley 44'	Stadium: Greenfields Sports Ground; Attendance: 65

18 November 2014	Matlock Town	0–1	Ilkeston	Matlock, Derbyshire
19:45			Williams 10'	Stadium: Causeway Lane; Attendance: 150

11 November 2014	Mossley	1–5	Northwich Victoria	Mossley, Greater Manchester
19:45	Matthews 89'		Burnett 21', 90'; Abadaki 24'; Dixon 68'; Sherratt 8' (pen.)	Stadium: Seel Park; Attendance: 73

11 November 2014	Nantwich Town	2–3	Stourbridge	Nantwich, Cheshire
19:45	Winslade 48'; Richards 49' (o.g.)		Bowerman 3', 80'; Ramsey-Dickson 9'	Stadium: The Weaver Stadium; Attendance: 122

11 November 2014	Newcastle Town	3–0	Halesowen Town	Newcastle-under-Lyme, Staffordshire
19:45	Gordon 5', 42'; Urwin 43'			Stadium: Lyme Valley Stadium; Attendance: 71

18 November 2014	Tividale	0–2	Stafford Rangers	Tividale, West Midlands
19:45			Dacres 47'; Cope 72'	Stadium: The Beeches; Attendance: 58

11 November 2014	Ossett Albion	0–3	Spennymoor Town	Ossett, West Yorkshire
19:45			Fisher 67'; Brown 88'; Sayer 90'	Stadium: Warehouse Systems Stadium; Attendance: 97

19 November 2014	Padiham	1–4	Bamber Bridge	Padiham, Lancashire
19:45	Byrom 4'		Marlow 2'; Pickup 51'; Waddecar 71'; Kay 84'	Stadium: Arbories Memorial Sports Ground; Attendance: 129

11 November 2014	Prescot Cables	1–2	Buxton	Prescot, Merseyside
19:45	Edgar 90'		Corner 31'; Williams 48'	Stadium: Valeria Park; Attendance: 86

18 November 2014	Radcliffe Borough	0–3	Warrington Town	Radcliffe, Greater Manchester
19:45			Metcalfe 19' (pen.); Mannix 32'; Foster 65'	Stadium: Stainton Park; Attendance: 69

25 November 2014	Ramsbottom United	5–1	Burscough	Ramsbottom, Greater Manchester
19:45	Piacentile 17'; Duff 27' (o.g.); Howson 45'; Hulme 67'; Spencer 80'		Joyce 8'	Stadium: The Harry Williams Riverside Stadium; Attendance: 140

11 November 2014	Romulus	0–3	Sutton Coldfield Town	Sutton Coldfield, West Midlands
19:45			Taylor 6'; Kalonji 26'; Marshall 31'	Stadium: The Central Ground; Attendance: 78

18 November 2014	Rushall Olympic	0–0 (3–2 p)	Chasetown	Rushall, West Midlands
19:45				Attendance: 114

11 November 2014	Scarborough Athletic	0–2	Farsley	Bridlington, East Riding of Yorkshire
19:45			Porritt 22'; Savory 29'	Stadium: Queensgate; Attendance: 133

11 November 2014	Sheffield	5–3	Ossett Town	Sheffield, South Yorkshire
19:45	Stirrup 6'; Gregory 32'; Whittaker 38'; Purkiss 70', 77'		Patterson 16'; Smith 58', 80'	Stadium: Coach and Horses Ground; Attendance: 77

11 November 2014	Spalding United	5–1	Mickleover Sports	Spalding, Lincolnshire
19:45	Waumsley 50', 75', 90', 90'; Oliver 56'		Demidh 36'	Stadium: Sir Halley Stewart Field; Attendance: 94

11 November 2014	Witton Albion	4–1	Kidsgrove Athletic	Northwich, Cheshire
19:45	Rainford 12'; Titchiner 69', 87'; Henders 83'		Booth 32'	Stadium: Wincham Park; Attendance: 124

11 November 2014	Workington	3–0	Skelmersdale United	Workington, Cumbria
19:45	Mwasile 9'; Tinnion 29'; Salmon 70'			Stadium: Borough Park; Attendance: 238

=== Second round ===
The 32 winners from the first round were entered into the second round draw on 19 November 2014. The ties are originally scheduled to be played between 2 and 3 December.

16 December 2014	Barwell	3–1	Gresley	Barwell, Leicestershire
19:45	Nisevic 37', 79'; Tomkinson 90'	Barwell report Gresley report	Smyth 70'	Stadium: Kirkby Road; Attendance: 79; Referee: Neil Pratt

2 December 2014	Belper Town	0–1	Ilkeston	Belper, Derbyshire
19:45		Belper Town report	Williams 71'	Stadium: Christchurch Meadow; Attendance: 171; Referee: Dave Plowright

2 December 2014	Brighouse Town	1–1 (4–5 p)	Spennymoor Town	Brighouse, West Yorkshire
19:45	Gay 89'	Brighouse Town report	Gibson 55'	Stadium: St Giles' Road; Attendance: 86
	Penalties
	Matthews (penalty scored); Scott (penalty missed); Hall (penalty scored); Boafo (penalty scored); Baldwin (penalty scored); Gay (penalty missed); Wilson (penalty missed)		(penalty scored) Dunlavey; (penalty scored) Brown; (penalty scored) Roberts; (penalty missed) Brown; (penalty scored) Ward; (penalty missed) Gibson; (penalty scored) Brown

2 December 2014	Droylsden	0–1	Marine	Droylsden, Greater Manchester
19:45		Droylsden report Marine report	Conchie 27'	Stadium: Butcher's Arms Ground; Attendance: 70; Referee: Christopher Hope

2 December 2014	Farsley	2–2 (4–3 p)	Curzon Ashton	Farsley, West Yorkshire
19:45	Hancock 74'; Priestley 82'	Farsley report Curzon Ashton report	Hunt 18'; Coley 60'	Stadium: Throstle Nest; Attendance: 74
	Penalties
	(penalty scored); Priestley (penalty missed) (penalty scored) (penalty scored); Harris (penalty scored)		(penalty scored) (penalty missed); (penalty missed) Thornton (penalty scored) (penalty scored)

1 December 2014	Harrogate Railway Athletic	7–1	Frickley Athletic	Harrogate, North Yorkshire
19:45	Ible 34' (o.g.); Baker 35'; Farquharson 43', 59', 63', 69'; Cartman 72'	Frickley Athletic report	Johnson 80'	Stadium: Station View; Attendance: 79

2 December 2014	Lancaster City	4–2	Witton Albion	Lancaster, Lancashire
19:45	Winder 48', 76' (pen.); Akrigg 82'; Taylor 89'	Lancaster City report	Read 13'; Henders 50' (pen.)	Stadium: Giant Axe; Attendance: 79

2 December 2014	Lincoln United	2–1	Buxton	Lincoln, Lincolnshire
19:45	Cotton 35', 43'	Lincoln United report Buxton report	Niven 34'	Stadium: Ashby Avenue; Attendance: 57

2 December 2014	Newcastle Town	1–1 (3–4 p)	Sutton Coldfield Town	Newcastle-under-Lyme, Staffordshire
19:45	Munoz 54'	Newcastle Town report	Boothe 75'	Stadium: Lyme Valley Stadium; Attendance: 57
	Penalties
	(penalty scored) (penalty scored); Askey (penalty missed) (penalty scored); Dickin (penalty missed)		(penalty missed) Nadat (penalty scored) (penalty scored) (penalty scored) (penalty scored)

2 December 2014	Northwich Victoria	2–1	Bamber Bridge	Flixton, Greater Manchester
19:45	Burnett 28'; Sherratt 36'		McKenna 76'	Stadium: Valley Road; Attendance: 75

2 December 2014	Salford City	1–3	Ramsbottom United	Salford, Greater Manchester
19:45	Webber 24'		Hulme 11'; Spencer 65', 90'	Stadium: Moor Lane; Attendance: 189

2 December 2014	Spalding United	5–1	Coalville Town	Spalding, Lincolnshire
19:45	Tidswell 2', 7'; Hempenstall 22'; Nuttell 40'; Waumsley 80'		Brooks 84'	Stadium: Sir Halley Stewart Field; Attendance: 90

6 January 2014	Stafford Rangers	2–2 (5–6 p)	Rushall Olympic	Stafford, Staffordshire
19:45	Curtis 71', 89'		Mugisha 34'; Heath 88'	Stadium: Marston Road; Attendance: 192

2 December 2014	Stourbridge	1–1 (2–4 p)	Leek Town	Stourbridge, West Midlands
19:45	Morgan-Parker 47'		Shotton 90'	Stadium: War Memorial Athletic Ground; Attendance: 146

2 December 2014	Workington	2–3	Warrington Town	Workington, Cumbria
19:45	Newby 41', 43'	Workington report Warrington Town report	Colbeck 4', 33'; Ruane 61'	Stadium: Borough Park; Attendance: 237

3 December 2014	Whitby Town	1–4	Sheffield	Whitby, North Yorkshire
19:45	Mason 73'	Whitby Town report Sheffield report	Longstaff 5', 20'; Walker 11'; Purkiss 90'	Stadium: Turnbull Ground; Attendance: 141

=== Third round ===
The 16 winners from the second round were entered into the third round draw on 4 December 2014. The ties are originally scheduled to be played between 12 and 20 January.

13 January 2015	Farsley	4–2	Sheffield	Farsley, West Yorkshire
19:45	Priestley 48', 90'; Grant 60'; Nightingale 62'	Farsley report Sheffield report	Walker 10'; Hadfield 33'	Stadium: Throstle Nest; Attendance: 83; Referee: Robert Sherwood

26 January 2015	Harrogate Railway Athletic	5–1	Spennymoor Town	Harrogate, North Yorkshire
19:45	Martin 6', 10', 18' (pen.); Youhill 41'; Hickey 83'	Spennymoor Town report	Brown 71'	Stadium: Station View; Attendance: 84

6 January 2015	Ilkeston	2–1	Lincoln United	Ilkeston, Derbyshire
19:45	Williams 69'; Morgan 87'	Ilkeston report Lincoln United report	Jacklin 70'	Stadium: New Manor Ground; Attendance: 109

13 January 2015	Lancaster City	2–1	Marine	Lancaster, Lancashire
19:45	Pearce 42'; Kilifin 59'	Lancaster City report Marine report	Wearing 44' (o.g.)	Stadium: Giant Axe; Attendance: 100; Referee: David Underwood

27 January 2015	Ramsbottom United	3–1	Northwich Victoria	Ramsbottom, Greater Manchester
19:45	Brooks 15'; Bennett 62'; Slaven 90'	Ramsbottom United report Northwich Victoria report	Abadaki 9'	Stadium: The Harry Williams Riverside Stadium; Attendance: 158

6 January 2015	Spalding United	4–1	Barwell	Spalding, Lincolnshire
19:45	Tidswell 17', 87'; Griffiths 24'; Webb 89'	Spalding United report Barwell report	Hadland 64'	Stadium: Sir Halley Stewart Field; Attendance: 64

13 January 2015	Rushall Olympic	0–3	Warrington Town	Rushall, West Midlands
19:45		Rushall Olympic report Warrington Town report	McCarten 17'; Duggan 30' (o.g.); Burke 55'	Stadium: Dales Lane; Attendance: 101

13 January 2015	Sutton Coldfield Town	0–3	Leek Town	Sutton Coldfield, West Midlands
19:45		Sutton Coldfield Town report Leek Town report	Shelley 20'; Shotton 75'; Johnson 77'	Stadium: The Central Ground; Attendance: 54

=== Quarter-finals ===
The 8 winners from the third round were entered into the Quarter-final draw on 20 January 2015. The ties are originally scheduled to be played between 17 and 25 February.

17 February 2015	Farsley	3–0	Lancaster City	Farsley, West Yorkshire
19:45	Porritt 47'; O'Brien 53'; Tonkinson 70'	Farsley report		Stadium: Throstle Nest; Attendance: 112

17 February 2015	Ilkeston	2–2 (5–4 p)	Spalding United	Ilkeston, Derbyshire
19:45	Reid 45'; Wright 63'	Spalding United report	Leary 16'; Griffiths 48'	Stadium: New Manor Ground; Attendance: 120
	Penalties
	(penalty scored) (penalty scored) (penalty scored) (penalty scored); Wright (penalty scored)		(penalty missed) J. Thurlbourne; (penalty scored) Leary; (penalty scored) Hall; (penalty scored) Hodge; (penalty scored) L. Thurlbourne

25 February 2015	Leek Town	0–1	Warrington Town	Leek, Staffordshire
19:45		Leek Town report Warrington Town report	Metcalfe 78'	Stadium: Harrison Park; Attendance: 111

10 February 2015	Ramsbottom United	3–1	Harrogate Railway Athletic	Ramsbottom, Greater Manchester
19:45	McDermott 29'; Pugh 35' (pen.); Hartley 90'	Ramsbottom United report	Yates 38'	Stadium: The Harry Williams Riverside Stadium; Attendance: 131

=== Semi-finals ===
The 4 winners from the Quarter-finals were entered into the Semi-final draw on 18 February 2015. The ties are originally scheduled to be played between 24 March and 8 April.

24 March 2015	Warrington Town	3–0	Ilkeston	Warrington, Cheshire
19:45	Metcalfe 17', 27'; Wharton 35'	Warrington Town report Ilkeston report		Stadium: Cantilever Park; Attendance: 356

8 April 2015	Ramsbottom United	1–2	Farsley	Ramsbottom, Greater Manchester
19:45	Abadaki 32'	Ramsbottom United report Farsley report	Grant 15'; O'Brien 52'	Stadium: The Harry Williams Riverside Stadium; Attendance: 189

=== Final ===
The Challenge Cup Final was played at Edgeley Park, the home ground of Stockport County. This was Farsley's first final appearance and the second final appearance for Warrington Town (they advanced to the final in 1993 but were defeated by Winsford United). This was the first final in which both teams were from lower divisions.

30 April 2015
19:45 BST

Farsley	0–0	Warrington Town
	Farsley report Warrington Town report
Penalties
Harris (penalty missed); Welsh (penalty missed); O'Brien (penalty scored); Priestley (penalty scored); Savory (penalty missed)	2–3	(penalty missed) Burke; (penalty scored) Wharton; (penalty scored) Metcalfe; (penalty scored) Gahgan

Edgeley Park, Stockport
Attendance: 731
Referee: Mark Astley

== See also ==
- Northern Premier League
- 2014–15 Isthmian League
- 2014–15 Southern League
