= 2013–14 Northern Premier League =

The 2013–14 season in English football is the 46th season of the Northern Premier League Premier Division, and the seventh season of the Northern Premier League Division One North and South. The League sponsors for 2013–14 are Evo-Stik.

It is the first season after restructuring of the Premier Division into a 24-team league.

== Premier Division ==
Northern Premier League Premier Division
- Season: 2013–14
- Champions: Chorley
- Promoted: Chorley; AFC Fylde
- Relegated: Droylsden; Stafford Rangers; Stocksbridge Park Steels
- Matches: 552
- Top goalscorer: Leon Mettam (45 goals)
- Biggest home win: Chorley 13–1 Droylsden (5 April 2014)
- Biggest away win: Droylsden 0–10 AFC Fylde (29 October 2013)
- Highest scoring: Chorley 13–1 Droylsden (5 April 2014)
- Highest attendance: 4,152; F.C. United of Manchester 2–2 Chorley (8 April 2014)
- Lowest attendance: 83; Droylsden 1–2 Barwell (8 April 2014)

The Premier Division featured six new teams:

- Barwell, transferred from the Southern League Premier Division
- Droylsden, relegated from Conference North
- Skelmersdale United, promoted as champions of NPL Division One North
- King's Lynn Town, promoted as champions of NPL Division One South
- Stamford, promoted via play-offs from NPL Division One South
- Trafford, promoted via play-offs from NPL Division One North

=== League table ===
Pos	Team	Pld	W	D	L	GF	GA	GD	Pts	Qualification or relegation
1	Chorley (C, P)	46	29	10	7	107	39	+68	97	Promotion to Conference North
2	F.C. United of Manchester	46	29	9	8	108	52	+56	96	Qualification for Playoffs
3	AFC Fylde (P)	46	28	9	9	97	41	+56	93	Qualification for Playoffs
4	Worksop Town	46	27	7	12	120	87	+33	88	Qualification for Playoffs and Demoted to NCEFL Premier Division
5	Ashton United	46	24	8	14	92	62	+30	80	Qualification for Playoffs
6	Skelmersdale United	46	24	5	17	92	79	+13	77	
7	Rushall Olympic	46	21	12	13	79	65	+14	75	
8	Blyth Spartans	46	20	12	14	79	78	+1	72	
9	Whitby Town	46	18	16	12	82	64	+18	70	
10	Trafford	46	20	8	18	77	73	+4	68	
11	King's Lynn Town	46	20	8	18	76	77	−1	68	
12	Matlock Town	46	18	13	15	61	53	+8	67	
13	Buxton	46	16	14	16	63	60	+3	62	
14	Barwell	46	17	11	18	62	67	−5	62	
15	Grantham Town	46	17	10	19	77	78	−1	61	
16	Witton Albion	46	17	9	20	77	80	−3	60	
17	Ilkeston	46	17	8	21	81	77	+4	59	
18	Stamford	46	17	7	22	75	85	−10	58	
19	Nantwich Town	46	14	14	18	77	71	+6	56	
20	Marine	46	13	14	19	68	76	−8	53	
21	Frickley Athletic	46	12	13	21	62	80	−18	49 (Note: Frickley Athletic finished 21st, in the final relegation place but were reprieved as Vauxhall Motors resigned from the Conference North and chose to play in a lower division than the Northern Premier League.)	
22	Stafford Rangers (R)	46	9	8	29	56	112	−56	35	Relegation to NPL Division One South
23	Stocksbridge Park Steels (R)	46	5	8	33	60	130	−70	23	Relegation to NPL Division One South
24	Droylsden (R)	46	2	3	41	40	182	−142	9	Relegation to NPL Division One North

Updated to match(es) played on 26 April 2014. Source:
Rules for classification: 1) points; 2) goal difference; 3) number of goals scored.
(C) Champions; (P) Promoted; (R) Relegated

=== Play-offs ===
Semifinals
2	F.C. United of Manchester	1
5	Ashton United (a.e.t.)	2
3	AFC Fylde	3
4	Worksop Town	1

Final
3	AFC Fylde	1(4)
5	Ashton United	1(3)

==== Semi-finals ====
29 April 2014
19:45

AFC Fylde	3–1	Worksop Town
Allen 19', 65', 90+5' (pen.)		Higginson 17'

Kellamergh Park, Warton, Fylde
Attendance: 576
29 April 2014
19:45

FC United of Manchester	1–2 (a.e.t.)	Ashton United
Wright 59' (pen.)		Johnson 90+2'; Higgins 120+2'

Gigg Lane, Bury
Attendance: 2,956

==== Final ====
3 May 2014
15:00

AFC Fylde	1–1	Ashton United
Penalties
	4–3

Kellamergh Park, Warton, Fylde
Attendance: 1,191

=== Results ===
Home \ Away	FYL	ASH	BAR	BLY	BUX	CHO	DRO	FCU	FRK	GRN	ILK	KLT	MAR	MAT	NAN	RSO	SKU	STA	STM	STO	TRA	WTB	WTN	WKS
AFC Fylde		1–0	1–0	5–1	2–2	0–1	5–0	0–2	2–0	1–2	1–2	1–0	0–0	2–0	1–2	2–1	2–3	2–1	2–0	5–0	2–1	3–1	3–0	3–2
Ashton United	1–1		0–1	3–3	2–0	2–1	4–1	2–1	2–2	2–1	1–3	5–1	4–1	0–0	1–0	2–0	4–1	4–0	2–1	3–2	2–0	3–4	1–4	2–3
Barwell	0–3	1–0		1–2	1–0	1–3	2–2	0–3	1–1	2–2	1–1	1–3	2–0	0–0	2–2	3–1	5–0	2–0	1–0	2–1	0–0	1–1	0–2	1–3
Blyth Spartans	1–1	2–1	2–1		0–1	3–1	3–0	0–1	2–0	2–1	3–2	1–3	2–2	1–2	2–2	3–2	2–1	6–2	2–1	3–0	2–1	0–7	4–2	3–3
Buxton	0–4	1–2	3–0	2–1		0–2	4–2	0–2	1–1	3–1	1–2	6–1	2–2	1–1	2–0	1–2	2–0	2–2	2–2	0–1	1–2	1–1	3–1	2–4
Chorley	3–1	3–3	1–2	3–0	0–0		13–1	0–1	2–0	3–1	2–1	1–0	4–0	3–1	5–1	0–1	4–1	3–0	3–0	3–1	6–2	0–0	1–0	1–0
Droylsden	0–10	0–9	1–2	0–0	1–1	0–5		1–4	2–3	0–3	1–5	1–2	0–4	1–4	1–6	1–5	0–3	2–3	0–3	2–3	0–6	0–2	4–3	3–4
F.C. United of Manchester	0–0	3–2	2–0	3–0	1–2	2–2	4–1		3–0	3–0	4–1	2–0	1–0	2–1	2–1	0–2	1–3	4–0	6–0	6–2	1–1	1–3	3–1	4–4
Frickley Athletic	0–2	0–2	2–1	0–1	0–1	0–0	2–0	1–2		3–2	0–1	2–2	1–1	1–3	2–0	4–2	4–3	2–0	1–1	2–2	2–1	1–1	0–0	2–2
Grantham Town	1–2	0–1	0–1	4–2	0–1	1–1	6–0	1–5	2–1		2–0	2–0	3–1	1–1	0–5	3–0	1–2	3–2	1–1	3–2	2–1	3–1	0–0	3–1
Ilkeston	0–1	1–2	4–2	0–1	0–2	2–3	5–1	3–3	1–0	0–2		3–4	1–2	1–3	3–1	0–1	2–1	0–0	3–0	6–1	1–1	0–2	1–1	0–0
King's Lynn Town	2–0	2–1	3–2	0–1	3–1	0–2	2–1	0–0	3–0	1–1	3–1		2–3	0–4	0–0	6–0	3–3	5–1	2–1	3–3	2–2	3–0	3–0	1–3
Marine	1–2	0–1	1–1	1–1	0–2	0–1	5–1	0–2	2–1	3–3	2–3	2–3		3–0	1–0	1–2	2–2	5–2	1–3	3–0	1–2	1–1	2–1	0–1
Matlock Town	1–1	0–0	2–1	1–1	1–1	1–2	2–0	1–1	0–0	4–1	1–0	2–0	0–0		2–1	1–1	2–1	0–2	2–0	3–0	3–2	2–0	0–1	1–0
Nantwich Town	1–1	2–2	2–0	1–1	1–1	0–1	4–0	1–1	2–1	1–1	2–2	2–0	1–2	1–1		3–2	2–2	4–1	3–1	2–1	0–1	4–3	0–2	2–3
Rushall Olympic	2–2	2–1	0–0	0–0	2–2	1–0	0–1	1–1	4–1	3–1	3–2	3–1	1–1	6–1	1–1		1–0	2–0	0–2	1–1	1–2	0–0	2–0	2–2
Skelmersdale United	0–5	1–1	1–0	4–3	2–0	1–0	7–3	1–3	3–2	1–2	2–0	3–0	4–1	1–0	2–1	1–0		3–2	0–1	6–0	3–1	4–2	1–3	2–1
Stafford Rangers	2–2	1–2	2–3	2–2	1–1	1–3	3–1	2–1	0–2	2–2	2–4	0–1	2–2	1–3	1–0	2–5	0–2		2–1	3–1	1–4	0–2	2–2	0–2
Stamford	1–3	2–1	0–2	3–4	1–0	1–1	4–0	2–3	6–4	1–2	0–2	3–0	2–4	1–0	2–2	3–4	2–0	2–0		4–3	2–2	1–2	3–1	2–2
Stocksbridge Park Steels	0–1	0–2	1–2	1–1	2–3	2–2	3–1	1–4	3–4	4–3	2–3	0–0	1–1	3–1	1–5	1–2	0–4	0–3	1–3		1–3	0–3	2–2	4–5
Trafford	2–0	4–1	2–4	2–1	0–0	0–5	1–0	2–3	4–1	2–1	2–5	1–2	1–0	2–1	0–1	3–1	2–0	1–2	0–2	1–0		0–3	3–3	0–2
Whitby Town	1–2	1–2	2–2	2–1	1–0	1–1	5–2	3–2	2–2	1–1	1–1	4–0	0–0	1–0	4–2	0–0	2–2	2–1	1–2	4–0	0–0		1–1	2–5
Witton Albion	0–1	1–2	1–2	0–1	0–1	2–2	5–1	2–5	2–1	2–1	2–1	1–0	2–3	1–0	3–2	2–4	2–3	5–0	2–1	4–1	0–4	3–1		2–2
Worksop Town	1–6	3–2	4–3	3–2	3–1	1–4	3–0	2–0	1–3	3–1	5–2	1–4	5–1	4–2	3–1	1–3	3–2	5–0	6–1	3–2	1–2	3–0	2–3	

Updated to match(es) played on 26 April 2014. Source: NPL Premier Division results grid
Legend: Blue = home team win; Yellow = draw; Red = away team win.

=== Stadia and locations ===
Locations of the 2013–14 Northern Premier League Premier Division teams

Team	Stadium	Capacity
F.C. United of Manchester	Gigg Lane (Bury ground share)	11,840
Grantham Town	South Kesteven Sports Stadium	7,500
King's Lynn Town	The Walks	5,733
Buxton	The Silverlands	5,200
Witton Albion	Wincham Park	4,813
Ashton United	Hurst Cross	4,500
Blyth Spartans	Croft Park	4,435
Chorley	The Chorley Group Victory Park Stadium	4,100
Ilkeston	New Manor Ground	3,500
Nantwich Town	The Weaver Stadium	3,500
Stocksbridge Park Steels	Look Local Stadium	3,500
Whitby Town	Turnbull Ground	3,500
Worksop Town	Sandy Lane	3,200
Droylsden	Butcher's Arms Ground	3,000
Stafford Rangers	Marston Road	3,000
Marine	The Arriva Stadium	2,800
Barwell	Kirkby Road	2,500
Skelmersdale United	West Lancashire College Stadium	2,500
Trafford	Shawe View	2,500
Matlock Town	Causeway Lane	2,214
Frickley Athletic	Westfield Lane	2,087
Stamford	Kettering Road	2,000
AFC Fylde	Kellamergh Park	1,500
Rushall Olympic	Dales Lane	1,400

== Division One North ==
Northern Premier League Division One North
- Season: 2013–14
- Champions: Curzon Ashton
- Promoted: Curzon Ashton; Ramsbottom United
- Relegated: Cammell Laird (resigned); Wakefield (folded)

Division One North will feature four new teams:

- Darlington 1883, promoted as champions of the Northern League Division One
- Kendal Town, relegated from the NPL Premier Division
- Northwich Victoria, transferred from the NPL Division One South
- Padiham, promoted as champions of the North West Counties League Premier Division

On 17 April 2014, the NPL announced that Cammell Laird and Wakefield had tendered their resignation from the league, and that they would take up the two relegation spots at the end of the season.

=== League table ===
Pos	Team	Pld	W	D	L	GF	GA	GD	Pts	Qualification or relegation
1	Curzon Ashton (C, P)	42	31	6	5	92	36	+56	99	Promotion to NPL Premier Division
2	Darlington 1883	42	28	6	8	101	37	+64	90	Qualification for Playoffs
3	Warrington Town	42	27	6	9	86	47	+39	87	Qualification for Playoffs
4	Bamber Bridge	42	26	5	11	81	45	+36	83	Qualification for Playoffs
5	Ramsbottom United (P, O)	42	25	8	9	112	57	+55	80 (Note: Ramsbottom United were deducted 3 points for fielding an ineligible player)	Qualification for Playoffs
6	Lancaster City	42	24	8	10	75	52	+23	80	
7	Farsley	42	21	12	9	76	51	+25	75	
8	Ossett Town	42	19	8	15	66	63	+3	65	
9	Northwich Victoria	42	16	15	11	73	52	+21	63	
10	Kendal Town	42	17	5	20	83	84	−1	56	
11	Cammell Laird	42	15	9	18	65	64	+1	54	Resigned to NWCFL Premier Division as new Cammell Laird 1907
12	Salford City	42	15	7	20	68	80	−12	52	
13	Harrogate Railway Athletic	42	14	6	22	52	66	−14	48	
14	Burscough	42	13	9	20	58	82	−24	48	
15	Mossley	42	13	8	21	73	90	−17	47	
16	New Mills	42	12	9	21	68	95	−27	45	
17	Clitheroe	42	12	7	23	55	81	−26	43	
18	Radcliffe Borough	42	12	7	23	57	93	−36	43	
19	Padiham	42	12	6	24	61	92	−31	42	
20	Prescot Cables	42	10	10	22	63	86	−23	40	
21	Ossett Albion	42	7	8	27	40	80	−40	29	
22	Wakefield	42	7	7	28	55	127	−72	28	Club folded at the end of the season

Updated to match(es) played on 21 April 2014. Source:
Rules for classification: 1) points; 2) goal difference; 3) number of goals scored.
(C) Champions; (O) Play-off winners; (P) Promoted

=== Play-offs ===
Semifinals
2	Darlington 1883	0
5	Ramsbottom United	2
3	Warrington Town	0
4	Bamber Bridge	1

Final
4	Bamber Bridge	2
5	Ramsbottom United	3

==== Semi-finals ====
29 April 2014
19:45

Warrington Town	0–1	Bamber Bridge
		Waddecar 48'

Cantilever Park, Warrington
Attendance: 477
30 April 2014
19:45

Darlington 1883	0–2	Ramsbottom United
		Priestley 23'; Hulme 32'

Heritage Park, Bishop Auckland
Attendance: 1,926

==== Final ====
3 May 2014
15:00

Bamber Bridge	2–3 (a.e.t.)	Ramsbottom United
Johnstone 22'; Alexander 90+6' (pen.)		Gaskell 6'; Howson 87'; Smalley 104'

Sir Tom Finney Stadium, Bamber Bridge
Attendance: 1,206

=== Results ===
Home \ Away	BAM	BUR	CAM	CLT	CZA	DAR	FAR	HRA	KEN	LNC	MOS	NEM	NOR	OSA	OST	PAD	PRC	RAD	RAM	SLC	WAK	WAR
Bamber Bridge		2–0	1–0	2–0	0–1	0–3	0–1	3–0	2–1	0–1	5–1	2–1	1–1	4–0	4–0	5–1	2–2	4–0	2–1	3–1	2–1	0–3
Burscough	1–4		2–3	2–3	0–1	0–7	0–0	2–1	4–0	0–1	0–3	3–2	1–2	0–0	1–2	3–4	2–2	1–3	1–1	2–0	1–0	0–0
Cammell Laird	0–1	2–1		1–0	0–1	0–2	2–3	2–4	2–3	2–3	1–1	5–0	0–0	0–1	1–2	2–0	2–1	2–1	2–1	2–2	4–2	0–0
Clitheroe	0–2	4–2	2–2		0–3	2–3	1–0	0–2	3–0	2–2	3–1	3–2	2–0	0–2	3–2	2–3	3–1	4–0	2–4	2–2	1–2	1–0
Curzon Ashton	3–2	1–1	2–0	1–0		1–0	1–2	1–0	3–1	1–0	2–1	2–2	0–0	2–0	0–2	2–2	6–0	3–1	2–2	4–0	5–0	2–3
Darlington 1883	1–0	1–2	3–1	6–0	0–4		3–0	0–0	3–1	0–2	4–0	2–0	0–1	7–0	4–1	3–0	2–2	3–0	0–1	2–2	5–1	2–0
Farsley	0–0	1–2	2–2	4–1	0–1	4–2		0–0	1–2	2–1	3–0	2–1	2–2	4–1	1–1	4–1	3–1	2–0	3–2	2–3	2–2	0–3
Harrogate Railway Athletic	1–2	1–0	4–1	3–2	0–1	0–2	1–1		3–1	1–3	0–2	5–0	2–1	2–3	0–1	4–0	2–1	2–2	0–4	0–1	2–0	0–2
Kendal Town	2–3	3–1	2–2	2–0	0–3	1–5	3–0	3–1		0–1	6–5	4–5	2–2	3–2	0–2	2–1	3–0	5–1	2–3	2–0	5–0	1–1
Lancaster City	0–2	1–1	1–0	1–1	1–0	0–0	2–2	2–1	2–2		2–1	0–1	1–0	1–0	2–1	1–1	2–0	4–1	1–3	2–1	5–2	3–1
Mossley	2–3	0–2	2–0	1–1	2–3	1–2	1–0	2–0	1–3	2–1		3–3	2–4	3–2	1–2	0–1	4–2	3–1	4–3	3–1	2–2	2–2
New Mills	0–2	4–2	3–0	2–1	1–3	0–3	0–4	4–1	0–4	2–1	2–1		2–2	2–2	2–0	2–3	0–0	0–3	2–3	0–2	8–2	2–3
Northwich Victoria	4–0	2–3	3–0	3–0	1–1	1–1	3–3	1–0	2–1	3–1	2–0	2–1		1–1	4–0	2–0	1–1	4–0	3–4	1–2	2–3	0–2
Ossett Albion	2–3	1–2	0–2	1–2	2–3	2–3	0–1	0–2	1–3	0–2	1–0	0–0	0–0		1–4	0–3	1–1	1–2	1–2	1–2	2–0	1–2
Ossett Town	1–0	3–3	1–1	2–0	2–1	1–2	0–1	1–1	1–0	0–3	3–3	3–3	1–0	0–1		3–1	2–1	0–1	2–0	0–3	2–3	0–1
Padiham	6–1	1–2	1–3	2–0	1–4	0–2	1–2	1–1	2–1	0–0	2–3	1–2	3–2	0–0	2–5		2–2	0–1	1–4	0–1	4–3	2–4
Prescot Cables	0–5	3–0	0–3	2–2	2–3	0–0	0–3	0–1	1–2	1–2	0–1	7–1	2–1	3–2	3–2	3–0		4–3	0–3	3–1	4–0	0–2
Radcliffe Borough	0–2	1–1	0–6	1–0	1–2	1–2	2–3	3–1	1–0	1–4	3–3	4–0	3–4	3–0	1–1	1–0	2–2		1–1	0–2	0–1	1–2
Ramsbottom United	0–0	7–1	0–2	4–1	1–3	3–0	1–1	5–0	3–0	6–0	3–1	1–1	2–2	2–0	2–2	1–2	5–3	8–0		5–2	3–1	3–2
Salford City	2–1	3–4	2–2	1–1	0–2	0–2	2–4	2–0	6–3	2–1	6–2	1–3	0–0	0–3	1–2	2–1	2–0	3–3	1–2		2–3	1–2
Wakefield	0–3	1–2	1–3	2–0	2–3	1–5	0–3	2–3	3–3	4–9	1–1	1–1	1–1	2–2	1–5	0–3	0–1	1–4	2–3	2–0		0–7
Warrington Town	1–1	1–0	3–0	3–0	1–5	1–4	0–0	2–0	2–1	2–3	3–2	2–1	1–3	2–0	0–1	7–2	3–2	2–0	1–0	3–1	4–0	

Updated to match(es) played on 21 April 2014. Source: NPL Division North results grid
Legend: Blue = home team win; Yellow = draw; Red = away team win.

=== Stadia and locations ===
Locations of the 2013–14 Northern Premier League Division One North teams

Team	Stadium	Capacity
Wakefield	Belle Vue (groundshare with Wakefield Trinity Wildcats)	11,000
Curzon Ashton	Tameside Stadium	4,000
Mossley	Seel Park	4,000
Farsley	Throstle Nest	3,900
Harrogate Railway Athletic	Station View	3,500
Lancaster City	Giant Axe	3,500
Radcliffe Borough	Stainton Park	3,500
Warrington Town	Cantilever Park	3,500
Prescot Cables	Valerie Park	3,200
Burscough	Queensgate	3,054
Ossett Albion	WareHouse Systems Stadium	3,000
Kendal Town	Lakeland Radio Stadium	2,400
Bamber Bridge	Sir Tom Finney Stadium	2,264
Clitheroe	Shawbridge	2,000
Northwich Victoria	Valley Road (former ground of Flixton)	2,000
Ossett Town	Ingfield	2,000
Ramsbottom United	The Harry Williams Riverside	2,000
Darlington 1883	Heritage Park (groundshare with Bishop Auckland)	1,994
Padiham	Arbories Memorial Sports Ground	1,688
Cammell Laird	Kirklands Stadium	1,500
New Mills	Church Lane	1,400
Salford City	Moor Lane	1,400

== Division One South ==
Northern Premier League Division One South
- Season: 2013–14
- Champions: Halesowen Town
- Promoted: Belper Town; Halesowen Town
- Relegated: Eastwood Town (resigned); Kidsgrove Athletic
- Biggest home win: Sutton Coldfield Town 6–0 Market Drayton Town
- Biggest away win: Loughborough Dynamo 0–8 Leek Town
- Highest scoring: Lincoln United 5–6 Loughborough Dynamo (11 goals)

Division One South will feature four new teams:

- Bedworth United, relegated from the Southern League Premier Division
- Eastwood Town, relegated from the NPL Premier Division
- Goole, transferred from the NPL Division One North
- Scarborough Athletic, promoted as champions from the Northern Counties East League Premier Division

=== League table ===
Pos	Team	Pld	W	D	L	GF	GA	GD	Pts	Qualification or relegation
1	Halesowen Town (C, P)	40	29	4	7	80	38	+42	91	Promotion to NPL Premier Division
2	Coalville Town	40	27	8	5	101	35	+66	89	Qualification for Playoffs
3	Leek Town	40	28	4	8	86	35	+51	88 (Note: Leek Town were deducted 3 points for fielding an ineligible player (vs Eastwood Town), but as Eastwood Town's record has been expunged this has no effect on their points total in the table.)	Qualification for Playoffs
4	Belper Town (P, O)	40	24	9	7	98	50	+48	81	Qualification for Playoffs
5	Mickleover Sports	40	22	7	11	82	62	+20	73	Qualification for Playoffs
6	Sutton Coldfield Town	40	19	7	14	74	53	+21	64	
7	Scarborough Athletic	40	18	7	15	73	57	+16	61	Transferred to the NPL Division One North
8	Newcastle Town	40	18	5	17	66	65	+1	59	
9	Gresley	40	17	5	18	66	67	−1	56	
10	Carlton Town	40	15	10	15	58	55	+3	55	
11	Romulus	40	16	7	17	66	64	+2	55	
12	Chasetown	40	14	10	16	52	59	−7	52	
13	Goole	40	15	6	19	60	75	−15	51	
14	Loughborough Dynamo	40	13	8	19	62	77	−15	47	
15	Rainworth Miners Welfare	40	12	10	18	52	72	−20	46	
16	Sheffield	40	12	8	20	69	80	−11	44	
17	Lincoln United	40	10	6	24	55	88	−33	36	
18	Brigg Town	40	9	8	23	49	94	−45	35	
19	Market Drayton Town	40	8	11	21	56	105	−49	35	
20	Bedworth United	40	9	7	24	48	83	−35	34	Transferred to the Southern League Division One Central
21	Kidsgrove Athletic	40	7	9	24	41	80	−39	30	
22	Eastwood Town	0	0	0	0	0	0	0	0 (Note: The Northern Premier League confirmed that Eastwood Town had resigned from competition on 9 March 2014 and as a result their playing record (PL:27, W:2, D:5, L:20) was expunged. A new Eastwood replaced in CMFL from 2014.)	Club resigned, record expunged. A new Eastwood replaced in CMFL from 2014.

Updated to match(es) played on 26 April 2014. Source:
Rules for classification: 1) points; 2) goal difference; 3) number of goals scored.
(C) Champions; (O) Play-off winners; (P) Promoted

=== Play-offs ===
Semifinals
2	Coalville Town	2
5	Mickleover Sports	3
3	Leek Town	0
4	Belper Town	2

Final
4	Belper Town	1
5	Mickleover Sports	0

==== Semi-finals ====
29 April 2014
19:45

Coalville Town	2–3	Mickleover Sports
De Girolamo 86' (o.g.); Saunders 90+2'		Oshoboke 20'; Kay 48' (o.g.); Webster 70'

Owen Street Sports Ground, Coalville
Attendance: 516
30 April 2014
19:45

Leek Town	0–2	Belper Town
		Cole 78'; Frogatt 86'

Harrison Park, Leek
Attendance: 814

==== Final ====
3 May 2014
15:00

Belper Town	1–0	Mickleover Sports
Watt 75'

Christchurch Meadow, Belper
Attendance: 1,021

=== Results ===
Home \ Away	BWU	BLP	BRG	CAR	CHA	COA	EAS	GOO	GRE	HAL	KID	LEE	LIN	LOU	MAR	MIC	NEW	RAI	ROM	SCA	SHE	SUT
Bedworth United		1–3	3–3	2–0	1–1	0–3		1–4	1–2	0–1	1–1	0–2	1–1	2–1	1–3	0–2	2–3	0–1	1–2	0–3	1–3	1–0
Belper Town	6–2		3–0	0–1	1–4	0–1		5–1	4–1	0–2	4–0	1–0	5–0	3–0	0–1	4–0	2–0	2–2	4–1	2–0	2–0	2–2
Brigg Town	0–2	2–6		0–2	1–1	0–2		3–1	2–1	2–2	2–1	0–4	0–3	2–1	2–2	1–2	1–2	1–3	1–0	0–3	2–1	2–3
Carlton Town	2–0	1–1	1–2		2–2	1–2		4–2	2–1	1–3	0–1	2–3	0–0	3–1	4–0	0–2	2–1	1–1	5–0	0–3	1–0	1–0
Chasetown	2–1	0–1	1–0	2–1		0–3		0–1	2–1	1–3	1–0	1–3	4–1	0–0	1–0	0–2	2–1	0–0	2–1	4–0	4–3	1–1
Coalville Town	6–1	4–2	5–1	5–0	3–1			1–0	0–2	0–1	2–0	0–0	2–1	4–0	4–1	1–3	4–0	4–1	1–2	2–0	1–1	1–1
Eastwood Town																						
Goole	3–1	2–6	2–1	1–3	3–1	0–3			1–3	0–0	3–2	0–3	2–1	1–1	4–1	1–2	1–0	3–2	1–1	1–3	0–3	0–1
Gresley	0–2	0–0	2–1	1–1	5–2	3–3		2–1		0–2	5–3	4–1	0–0	0–1	2–2	1–3	3–0	1–0	2–1	0–2	2–0	2–1
Halesowen Town	5–0	3–4	3–0	0–2	0–0	0–3		3–2	5–0		2–0	1–0	2–1	1–0	3–1	2–1	3–2	1–0	1–0	3–0	3–0	0–1
Kidsgrove Athletic	2–0	0–1	2–2	1–1	2–1	2–2		1–1	2–1	2–2		2–0	1–2	0–3	0–0	2–2	0–3	4–1	2–1	1–1	2–3	0–3
Leek Town	1–0	1–1	4–1	1–0	3–0	0–1		2–1	2–0	4–1	1–0		1–0	2–1	5–0	4–0	2–1	0–1	1–0	2–2	2–1	3–2
Lincoln United	1–3	4–1	4–2	0–3	1–2	1–4		1–0	2–1	1–3	2–1	1–5		5–6	2–2	0–2	2–3	1–2	2–1	3–3	0–1	1–4
Loughborough Dynamo	1–1	1–2	0–0	2–4	1–2	2–1		0–2	4–3	1–2	4–0	0–8	3–1		1–4	2–4	1–1	2–3	1–1	2–1	3–2	1–2
Market Drayton Town	2–2	2–2	2–4	2–2	2–1	1–7		2–2	1–2	0–3	2–1	1–2	3–1	2–3		1–4	0–4	1–4	3–2	2–4	3–2	1–1
Mickleover Sports	5–3	1–1	3–0	2–2	2–1	1–1		2–2	3–2	2–4	1–0	2–3	1–2	0–3	4–1		2–0	2–1	2–1	2–1	3–4	2–1
Newcastle Town	1–3	2–2	3–3	2–0	0–0	0–3		2–3	1–0	2–1	4–0	2–0	1–2	2–1	4–1	1–0		2–1	2–4	2–0	3–5	2–0
Rainworth Miners Welfare	1–0	1–4	1–3	1–1	3–1	0–1		0–3	3–2	0–2	2–1	0–5	2–2	0–0	3–3	1–1	1–2		0–0	1–2	3–1	0–0
Romulus	0–1	0–1	3–0	1–0	2–2	2–5		2–0	3–2	0–2	4–0	1–2	3–2	3–2	0–0	4–3	2–2	4–2		4–2	3–0	1–2
Scarborough Athletic	1–0	3–3	4–0	3–0	1–0	1–3		1–2	0–1	3–1	5–0	1–1	2–0	1–3	3–0	2–2	2–1	4–0	1–3		1–3	2–0
Sheffield	4–4	1–3	1–1	0–0	2–1	2–2		2–3	1–3	2–3	2–0	1–2	4–0	2–2	3–1	1–5	1–2	3–1	1–1	1–1		2–4
Sutton Coldfield Town	1–3	3–4	5–1	4–2	1–1	1–1		4–0	2–3	0–1	3–2	2–1	2–1	0–1	6–0	1–0	3–0	2–3	1–2	2–1	2–0	

Updated to match(es) played on 26 April 2014. Source: NPL Premier Division results grid
Legend: Blue = home team win; Yellow = draw; Red = away team win.

=== Stadia and locations ===
Locations of the 2013–14 Northern Premier League Division One South teams

Team	Stadium	Capacity
Halesowen Town	The Grove	5,000
Eastwood Town	Coronation Park	5,000
Brigg Town	The Hawthorns	4,000
Newcastle Town	Lyme Valley Stadium	4,000
Leek Town	Harrison Park	3,600
Bedworth United	The Oval Ground	3,000
Goole	Victoria Pleasure Grounds	3,000
Scarborough Athletic	Queensgate (groundshare with Bridlington Town)	3,000
Belper Town	Christchurch Meadow	2,400
Gresley	The Moat Ground	2,400
Lincoln United	Ashby Avenue	2,200
Chasetown	The Scholars Ground	2,000
Coalville Town	Owen Street Sports Ground	2,000
Kidsgrove Athletic	The Seddon Stadium	2,000
Rainworth Miners Welfare	Welfare Ground	2,000
Romulus	The Central Ground (Sutton Coldfield Town ground share)	2,000
Sheffield	Coach and Horses Ground	2,000
Sutton Coldfield Town	The Central Ground	2,000
Carlton Town	Bill Stokeld Stadium	1,500
Loughborough Dynamo	Nanpantan Sports Ground	1,500
Mickleover Sports	Raygar Stadium	1,500
Market Drayton Town	Greenfields Sports Ground	1,000

== Challenge Cup ==
2013–14 Northern Premier League Challenge Cup
The Doodson Sport Cup

Tournament details
- Country: England
- Teams: 68

Final positions
- Champions: AFC Fylde
- Runners-up: Skelmersdale United

Tournament statistics
- Matches played: 67
- Goals scored: 234 (3.49 per match)

The 2013–14 Northern Premier League Challenge Cup is the 44th season of the Northern Premier League Challenge Cup, the main cup competition in the Northern Premier League. It will be sponsored by Doodson Sport for a third consecutive season. 68 clubs from England will enter the competition, beginning with the preliminary round on 3 September.

The defending champions are North Ferriby United, who beat Curzon Ashton on penalties after a 1–1 result in regulation and extra time in the 2013 Final. North Ferriby United will be unable to defend their title as they were promoted to the Conference North after being the 2012–13 NPL Premier Division champions.

Changes from previous cups include the elimination of a round by having the Premier Division teams enter in the first round instead of the third round as in previous years and, instead of going into extra time, all ties in the preliminary through semi-final rounds will end after 90 minutes and conclude with penalties.

=== Calendar ===
Round	Clubs remaining	Clubs involved	Winners from previous round	New entries this round	Scheduled playing date
Preliminary round	68	8	0	8	3–17 September 2013
First round proper	64	64	4	60	11 November – 3 December 2013
Second round proper	32	32	32	none	27 November 2013 – 7 January 2014
Third round proper	16	16	16	none	14 January – 4 February 2014
Quarter-finals	8	8	8	none	8–26 February 2014
Semi-finals	4	4	4	none	11–12 March 2014
Final	2	2	2	none	13 April 2014

=== Preliminary round ===
Eight teams from the Northern Premier League Division One North or Northern Premier League Division One South had to compete in the preliminary round to win a place in the competition proper. The draw for the preliminary round took place on 9 August 2013.

3 September 2013	Lincoln United	2–0	Wakefield	Lincoln, Lincolnshire
19:45	Mowbray 45', 56'	Lincoln United Report		Stadium: Ashby Avenue; Attendance: 74

17 September 2013	Loughborough Dynamo	2–0	Rainworth Miners Welfare	Loughborough, Leicestershire
19:45	Betts 37'; Blair 53'	Loughborough Dynamo Report; Rainworth Miners Welfare Report		Stadium: Nanpantan Sports Ground; Attendance: 45

17 September 2013	Mossley	4–3	Padiham	Mossley, Greater Manchester
19:45	Broadbent 45', 73'; Nightingale 75'; Gardner 89'	Mossley Report	Allen 19'; Bradley 25'; Pickup 55'	Stadium: Seel Park; Attendance: 47

3 September 2013	Newcastle Town	1–0	Market Drayton Town	Newcastle-under-Lyme, Staffordshire
19:45	Nagington 8'	Newcastle Town Report		Stadium: Lyme Valley Stadium; Attendance: 58

=== First round ===
Teams that weren't in the preliminary round from Northern Premier League Division One North or Northern Premier League Division One South entered at this stage as well as teams from the Northern Premier League Premier Division, along with the winners from the preliminary round. The draw for this round was made on 9 August 2013 with the ties originally scheduled to be played 11 to 13 November 2013.

12 November 2013	Barwell	5–0	Coalville Town	Barwell, Leicestershire
19:45	Barlone 45'; Richards 62'; Quinn 72'; Julien 79'; Weale 82'	Barwell Report; Coalville Town Report		Stadium: Kirkby Road; Attendance: 136

12 November 2013	Belper Town	3–0	Ilkeston	Belper, Derbyshire
19:45	Wells 8', 37', 86'	Belper Town Report; Ilkeston Report		Stadium: Christchurch Meadow; Attendance: 150

12 November 2013	Burscough	3–0	Warrington Town	Burscough, Lancashire
19:45	Roberts 13', 66' (pen.); Caddick 72'	Warrington Town Report		Stadium: Victoria Park; Attendance: 124

13 November 2013	Carlton Town	1–1 (6–5 p)	Buxton	Carlton, Nottinghamshire
19:45	Troke 77'	Carlton Report; Buxton Report	Bradbury 67'	Stadium: Bill Stokeld Stadium; Attendance: 58

12 November 2013	Chasetown	2–0	Newcastle Town	Chasetown, Staffordshire
19:45	Brown 55' (pen.); Smith 80'	Chasetown Report; Newcastle Town Report		Stadium: The Scholars Ground; Attendance: 102

13 November 2013	Darlington 1883	5–1	Blyth Spartans	Bishop Auckland, County Durham
19:45	Dowson 51'; Purewal 59'; Kendrick 63' (o.g.); Fisher 82'; Turner 86'	Darlington 1883 Report; Blyth Spartans Report	Hubbard 75'	Stadium: Heritage Park; Attendance: 309; Referee: Michael McDonough

12 November 2013	Droylsden	2–3	Frickley Athletic	Droylsden, Greater Manchester
19:45	Rouse-Edmondson 39'; Freakes 78'	Droylsden Report; Frickley Athletic Report	Allott 27' (pen.), 86' (pen.); Kenny 76'	Stadium: Butcher's Arms Ground; Attendance: 59; Referee: Dominic McDonald

13 November 2013	Gresley	1–1 (4–2 p)	Eastwood Town	Church Gresley, Derbyshire
19:45	Nadat 33'	Gresley Report	Witton 89'	Stadium: Moat Ground; Attendance: 119; Referee: Michael Scriven

12 November 2013	Goole	0–4	Farsley	Goole, East Riding of Yorkshire
19:45		Farsley Report	O'Brien 9' (pen.), 36'; Priestley 17'; Dempsey 32'	Stadium: Victoria Pleasure Grounds; Attendance: 72; Referee: A. Marshall

12 November 2013	Grantham Town	5–0	Bedworth United	Grantham, Lincolnshire
19:45	McGhee 8'; Towey 10'; Graham 14'; Fairclough 24'; Jackson 38'	Grantham Town Report; Bedworth United Report		Stadium: South Kesteven Sports Stadium; Attendance: 84; Referee: M. Smith

11 November 2013	Harrogate Railway Athletic	3–0	Stocksbridge Park Steels	Harrogate, North Yorkshire
19:45	Cartman 16'; Metcalfe 32'; Morris 61'	Harrogate Railway Athletic Report		Stadium: Station View; Attendance: 37

12 November 2013	Kendal Town	1–3	Chorley	Kendal, Cumbria
19:45	McGahon 3'	Kendal Town Report	Teague 17'; Wiles 86'; Stephenson 90'	Stadium: The Northgate Vehicle Hire Stadium; Attendance: 162

12 November 2013	Kidsgrove Athletic	1–1 (5–4 p)	Halesowen Town	Kidsgrove, Staffordshire
19:45	Smith 57'	Halesowen Town Report	Hill 51'	Stadium: The Seddon Stadium; Attendance: 59

12 November 2013	Lancaster City	1–3	Bamber Bridge	Lancaster, Lancashire
19:45	Walker 18'	Lancaster City Report; Bamber Bridge Report	Thompson 27', 58'; Waddecar 36'	Stadium: Giant Axe; Attendance: 121

12 November 2013	Marine	0–0 (3–4 p)	Ashton United	Crosby, Merseyside
19:45		Marine Report; Ashton United Report		Stadium: Arriva Stadium; Attendance: 99; Referee: Patrick Mahon
	Penalties
	A. Fowler (penalty scored); J. Fowler (penalty scored); Rainford (penalty scored); Jones (penalty missed); Corrigan (penalty missed)		(penalty scored) Young; (penalty scored) Gee; (penalty missed) O’Neill; (penalty scored) Coppin; (penalty scored) Phillips

12 November 2013	Mickleover Sports	4–0	Matlock Town	Mickleover, Derbyshire
19:45	Demidh 47', 72'; Ritchie-Smith 65', 67'	Mickleover Sports Report; Matlock Town Report		Stadium: Arriva Stadium; Attendance: 111; Referee: A. Hull

12 November 2013	Mossley	0–2	AFC Fylde	Mossley, Greater Manchester
19:45		Mossley Report; AFC Fylde Report	Winslade 51'; Booth 70' (pen.)	Stadium: Seel Park; Attendance: 102; Referee: G. Mellor

19 November 2013	Nantwich Town	5–0	Leek Town	Nantwich, Cheshire
19:45	Deegan 16', 61'; White 34'; Clayton 75', 80'	Nantwich Town Report; Leek Town Report		Stadium: The Weaver Stadium; Attendance: 82

18 November 2013	New Mills	2–4	Rushall Olympic	New Mills, Derbyshire
19:45	Knight 24'; Hewitt 33' (o.g.)	New Mills Report; Rushall Olympic Report	Mugisha 11'; Kitching 47', 51'; Ellis 75'	Stadium: Church Lane; Attendance: 60

19 November 2013	Northwich Victoria	0–2	Trafford	Flixton, Greater Manchester
19:45		Northwich Victoria Report	Palmer 45'; Payne 57'	Stadium: Valley Road; Attendance: 86

12 November 2013	Ossett Albion	1–3	Scarborough Athletic	Ossett, West Yorkshire
19:45	Jones 39'	Ossett Albion Report; Scarborough Athletic Report	Blott 41'; Clough 90', 90'	Stadium: WareHouse Systems Stadium; Attendance: 126

12 November 2013	Prescot Cables	0–6	Skelmersdale United	Prescot, Merseyside
19:45		Skelmersdale United Report	Astbury 15', 26'; Tuck 45'; Ince 77'; Ahmadi 86'; Hughes 90'	Stadium: Valerie Park; Attendance: 134; Referee: A. Clayton

12 November 2013	Radcliffe Borough	3–0	Clitheroe	Radcliffe, Greater Manchester
19:45	Sherlock 4'; Robinson 11'; White 83'	Clitheroe Report		Stadium: Stainton Park; Attendance: 105

12 November 2013	Ramsbottom United	1–2	F.C. United of Manchester	Ramsbottom, Greater Manchester
19:45	Priestley 13'	Ramsbottom United Report; F.C. United Report	Mullholland 10'; Norton 65'	Stadium: The Harry Williams Riverside Stadium; Attendance: 464

11 November 2013	Romulus	2–2 (3–4 p)	Stafford Rangers	Sutton Coldfield, West Midlands
19:45	Johnson 14', 90'	Romulus Report; Stafford Rangers Report	Bullock 21'; Burke 45'	Stadium: The Central Ground; Attendance: 60

12 November 2013	Salford City	0–1	Cammell Laird	Salford, Greater Manchester
19:45		Salford City Report; Cammell Laird Report	Evans 48'	Stadium: Moor Lane; Attendance: 64

26 November 2013	Sheffield	2–3	Ossett Town	Sheffield, South Yorkshire
19:45	Thomas 4'; Gascoine 84'	Sheffield Report; Ossett Town Report	Wood 11'; Ward 19'; Moke 83'	Stadium: Coach and Horses Ground; Attendance: 102

12 November 2013	Stamford	6–0	Lincoln United	Stamford, Lincolnshire
19:45	Jones 6'; Robbins 14', 77'; Wesley 37', 45'; Arthur 86'	Stamford Report; Lincoln United Report		Stadium: Kettering Road; Attendance: 98

12 November 2013	Sutton Coldfield Town	2–4	Loughborough Dynamo	Sutton Coldfield, Lincolnshire
19:45	Danks 47', 60'	Sutton Coldfield Town Report; Loughborough Dynamo Report	Nurse 26', 61'; Smithson 66'; Kelly 74'	Stadium: Central Ground; Attendance: 36

13 November 2013	Whitby Town	0–0 (5–6 p)	Brigg Town	Whitby, North Yorkshire
19:45		Whitby Town Report		Stadium: Turnbull Ground; Attendance: 115

3 December 2013	Witton Albion	1–0	Curzon Ashton	Northwich, Cheshire
19:45	Andrews 31'	Curzon Ashton Report		Stadium: Wincham Park; Attendance: 115

13 November 2013	Worksop Town	3–3 (7–6 p)	King's Lynn Town	Worksop, Nottinghamshire
19:45	Davies 49'; Wall 53'; Lemon 90'	Worksop Town Report; King's Lynn Town Report	Hall 60' (pen.); Jones 70'; Goodfellow 84'	Stadium: Sandy Lane; Attendance: 217; Referee: R. West
	Penalties
	Barnett (penalty scored); Mullen (penalty scored); Lemon (penalty scored); Davies (penalty missed); Salt (penalty scored); Hague (penalty scored); Twell (penalty scored); Williams (penalty scored)		(penalty scored) Goodfellow; (penalty scored) Mills; (penalty missed) Hall; (penalty scored) Yong; (penalty scored) Thomson; (penalty scored) Stocker; (penalty scored) Mulready; (penalty missed) R. Clarke

=== Second round ===
The 32 winners from the first round were entered into the second round draw on 14 November 2013. The ties are originally scheduled to be played between 27 November and 4 December.

3 December 2013	AFC Fylde	3–1	Burscough	Fylde, Lancashire
19:45	Fleming 33', 68'; Mullen 88'	AFC Fylde Report	Roberts 84'	Stadium: Kellamergh Park; Attendance: 110

3 December 2013	Barwell	2–0	Rushall Olympic	Barwell, Leicestershire
19:45	Edwards 75'; Barlone 77'	Barwell Report; Rushall Olympic Report		Stadium: Kirkby Road; Attendance: 68

3 December 2013	Brigg Town	2–0	Scarborough Athletic	Brigg, Lincolnshire
19:45	Thewlis 34'; Dickens 36'	Brigg Town Report; Scarborough Athletic Report		Stadium: The Hawthorns; Attendance: 89

3 December 2013	Cammell Laird	2–3	Bamber Bridge	Birkenhead, Merseyside
19:45	Foy 61'; Cairns 70'	Cammell Laird Report; Bamber Bridge Report	Hollett 31' (o.g.); Buchan 53'; Waddecar 85'	Stadium: Kirklands Stadium

27 November 2013	Carlton Town	3–2	Mickleover Sports	Carlton, Nottinghamshire
19:45	MacVicar 81'; Vilums 82', 85'	Carlton Town Report	Oshoboke 37', 55'	Stadium: Bill Stokeld Stadium; Attendance: 64

7 January 2014	Chorley	1–4	Witton Albion	Chorley, Lancashire
19:45	Stephenson 63'	Chorley Report; Witton Albion Report	Hancock 24', 73'; Brown 27'; Simm 54'	Stadium: Victory Park; Attendance: 247

4 December 2013	Darlington 1883	1–3	Ossett Town	Bishop Auckland, County Durham
19:45	White 7'	Darlington 1883 Report; Ossett Town Report	Qualter 45'; Ward 64', 66'	Stadium: Heritage Park; Attendance: 183

4 December 2013	F.C. United of Manchester	2–0	Ashton United	Stalybridge, Greater Manchester
19:45	Brownhill 81'; Daniels 88'	F.C. United Report; Ashton United Report		Stadium: Bower Fold; Attendance: 282

3 December 2013	Frickley Athletic	1–0	Belper Town	South Elmsall, West Yorkshire
19:45	Allott 16'	Frickley Athletic Report; Belper Town Report		Stadium: Westfield Lane; Attendance: 116

3 December 2013	Grantham Town	0–2	Gresley	Grantham, Lincolnshire
19:45		Grantham Town Report; Gresley Report	Langston 71'; Piliero 88'	Stadium: South Kesteven Sports Stadium; Attendance: 95; Referee: M. Hutchinson

2 December 2013	Harrogate Railway Athletic	0–0 (2–4 p)	Farsley	Harrogate, North Yorkshire
19:45				Stadium: Station View; Attendance: 70

3 December 2013	Kidsgrove Athletic	2–3	Chasetown	Kidsgrove, Staffordshire
19:45	Espley 70'; Grocott 79'	Chasetown Report	Brown 24', 43' (pen.); Wellecomme 49'	Stadium: The Seddon Stadium; Attendance: 66

3 December 2013	Loughborough Dynamo	4–2	Stafford Rangers	Loughborough, Leicestershire
19:45	Betts 3'; Smithson 10', 56'; Nurse 70'	Loughborough Dynamo Report; Stafford Rangers Report	Bateman 48'; Cope 81'	Stadium: Nanpantan Sports Ground; Attendance: 61

3 December 2013	Trafford	0–4	Nantwich Town	Flixton, Greater Manchester
19:45		Nantwich Town Report	Bayunu 24' (o.g.); Foster 48', 80'; Deegan 90'	Stadium: Shawe View; Attendance: 104

3 December 2013	Radcliffe Borough	0–2	Skelmersdale United	Radcliffe, Greater Manchester
19:45		Skelmersdale United Report	Laird 25', 69'	Stadium: Stainton Park; Attendance: 127; Referee: Bob Roberts

3 December 2013	Stamford	3–1	Worksop Town	Stamford, Lincolnshire
19:45	Shariff 17'; Robbins 85'; Moyo 90'	Stamford Report; Worksop Town Report	Adams 24'	Stadium: Kettering Road; Attendance: 108; Referee: J. Thornhill

=== Third round ===
The 16 winners from the second round were entered into the third round draw on 6 December 2013. The ties are originally scheduled to be played 14 or 21 January. The Brigg Town and Frickley Athletic match was originally played 21 January but was abandoned with Frickley Athletic leading 1–0 after a player was injured.

14 January 2014	AFC Fylde	4–0	Nantwich Town	Fylde, Lancashire
19:45	Cooke 58', 79'; Chippendale 61'; Lloyd-McGoldrick 72'	AFC Fylde Report; Nantwich Town Report		Stadium: Kellamergh Park; Attendance: 93

28 January 2014	Brigg Town	2–5	Frickley Athletic	Brigg, Lincolnshire
19:45	Nichol 59'; Matthews 85'	Frickley Athletic Report	Allott 3', 46', 60' (pen.); Hinsley 17', 70'	Stadium: The Hawthorns; Attendance: 70

14 January 2014	Chasetown	3–1	Barwell	Chasetown, Staffordshire
19:45	Sullivan 48', 62', 65'	Chasetown Report	Barlone 33' (pen.)	Stadium: The Scholars Ground; Attendance: 84

4 February 2014	Witton Albion	0–4	Skelmersdale United	Northwich, Cheshire
19:45		Witton Albion Report; Skelmersdale United Report	Brown 41' (o.g.); Morning 45'; Astbury 88', 90'	Stadium: Wincham Park; Attendance: 143

14 January 2014	Farsley	1–0	Bamber Bridge	Farsley, West Yorkshire
19:45	Priestley 61'	Farsley Report		Stadium: Throstle Nest; Attendance: 60

14 January 2014	Loughborough Dynamo	3–2	Gresley	Loughborough, Leicestershire
19:45	Norris 21'; Betts 45'; Blakely 77'	Loughborough Dynamo Report; Gresley Report	Langston 27'; Steadman 29'	Stadium: Nanpantan Sports Ground; Attendance: 101

14 January 2014	Ossett Town	1–2	F.C. United of Manchester	Ossett, West Yorkshire
19:45	Hannity 4'	Ossett Town Report; F.C. United Report	Giggs 19'; Norton 66'	Stadium: Ingfield; Attendance: 275

21 January 2014	Stamford	1–3	Carlton Town	Stamford, Lincolnshire
19:45	Robbins 70'	Stamford Report; Carlton Town Report	Brothwell 26'; Wiggins-Thomas 61'; Hastings 72'	Stadium: Kettering Road; Attendance: 75

=== Quarter-finals ===
The 8 winners from the third round were entered into the Quarter-finals draw on 22 January 2014. The ties are originally scheduled to be played 8, 25 February, or 26.

8 February 2014	AFC Fylde	4–1	Chasetown	Fylde, Lancashire
15:00	Lloyd-McGoldrick 13'; Booth 20' (pen.); Allen 36', 50'	AFC Fylde Report; Chasetown Report	Brown 69' (pen.)	Stadium: Kellamergh Park; Attendance: 192

25 February 2014	Frickley Athletic	2–0	Loughborough Dynamo	South Elmsall, West Yorkshire
19:45	Wilcox 33'; Villermann 49'	Frickley Athletic Report; Loughborough Dynamo Report		Stadium: Westfield Lane; Attendance: 133; Referee: Alan Hull

26 February 2014	Carlton Town	2–1	F.C. United of Manchester	Carlton, Nottinghamshire
19:45	Troke 27'; Brindley 79'	F.C. United of Manchester Report	Greaves 12'	Stadium: Bill Stokeld Stadium; Attendance: 336

25 February 2014	Skelmersdale United	4–0	Farsley	Skelmersdale, West Lancashire
19:45	Miller 29', 51', 77'; Greene 59'	Skelmersdale United Report; Farsley Report		Stadium: West Lancashire College Stadium; Attendance: 103; Referee: Kelvin Sarsfield

=== Semi-finals ===
The 4 winners from the Quarter-finals were entered into the Semi-finals draw on 26 February 2014, with Carlton Town from the Northern Premier League Division One South remaining as the lowest-placed team still in the Cup. The ties are originally scheduled to be played 11 and 12 March.

12 March 2014	Carlton Town	2–4	Skelmersdale United	Carlton, Nottinghamshire
19:45	MacVicar 43', 72'	Skelmersdale United Report	Hardwick 13' (pen.); Astbury 25', 63'; Carden 57'	Stadium: Bill Stokeld Stadium; Attendance: 114

11 March 2014	Frickley Athletic	0–0 (3–4 p)	AFC Fylde	South Elmsall, West Yorkshire
19:45		Frickley Athletic Report; AFC Fylde Report		Stadium: Westfield Lane; Attendance: 106
	Penalties
	Jeffs (penalty missed); Ghiachem (penalty scored); Allott (penalty scored); Denton (penalty scored); Picton (penalty missed)		(penalty scored) Sumner; (penalty scored) Lloyd; (penalty scored) Denson; (penalty scored) Hinchliffe

=== Final ===
The Challenge Cup Final was played at Edgeley Park, the home ground of Stockport County. This was AFC Fylde's first Final appearance and the second Final appearance for Skelmersdale United (they advanced to the final in 2008 but were defeated by Eastwood Town). After a 35th-minute goal, AFC Fylde won their first Challenge Cup.

13 April 2014
15:07 BST

AFC Fylde	1–0	Skelmersdale United
Winter 35'	AFC Fylde Report; Skelmersdale United Report

Edgeley Park, Stockport
Attendance: 358
Referee: Thomas Bramall

== Peter Swales Shield ==
2014 Peter Swales Shield
Halesowen Town	Curzon Ashton
3	1
- Date: 3 May 2014
- Venue: The Grove, Halesowen
- Attendance: 440

For the 2014 edition of the Peter Swales Shield, the 2013–14 champions of the Northern Premier League First Division North, Curzon Ashton, played against the 2013–14 champions of the Northern Premier League First Division South, Halesowen Town.

3 May 2014

Halesowen Town (2013–14 NPL Division One South Winners)	3–1	Curzon Ashton (2013–14 NPL Division One North Winners)
Haseley 65'; Christie 70'; Hull 79'	Halesowen Town Report; Curzon Ashton Report	Hampson 90'

The Grove, Halesowen, West Midlands
Attendance: 440

== See also ==
- 2013–14 Isthmian League
- 2013–14 Southern League
