= Daryl Taylor =

English footballer

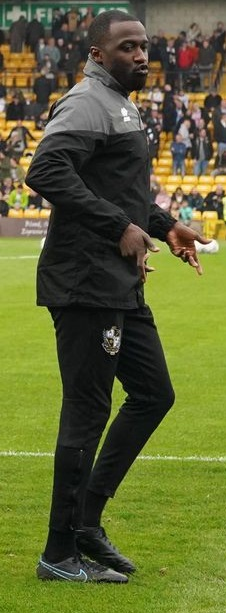
- Taylor at Vale Park in May 2022

Personal information
- Full name: Daryl Shea Taylor
- Date of birth: 14 November 1984 (age 41)
- Place of birth: Birmingham, England
- Height: 5 ft 10 in (1.78 m)
- Position: Winger

Youth career
- 1999–2004: Aston Villa

Senior career*
Years	Team	Apps	(Gls)
2004–2006	Walsall	30	(3)
2005	→ Hereford United (loan)	5	(0)
2006	→ Hereford United (loan)	10	(0)
2006	AFC Bournemouth	0	(0)
2006	→ Bury (loan)	4	(0)
2006–2007	Tamworth	23	(4)
2007–2008	Halifax Town	21	(1)
2008	Kettering Town	2	(0)
2008	Halesowen Town		
2008–2009	Hinckley United		
2009–2010	Halesowen Town	10	(1)
2010	Chippenham Town		
201?–2015	Sutton Coldfield Town		
Total		108	(9)
- * Club domestic league appearances and goals

Daryl Shea Taylor (born 14 November 1984) is an English former professional footballer who played as a winger who is now a fitness coach at EFL League Two club Shrewsbury Town.

A former Aston Villa trainee, he made his senior debut with Walsall in August 2004. He scored in each of his first three appearances. However, he suffered a serious knee ligament injury on loan at Hereford United towards the end of the 2004–05 season. He spent seven months in recovery and rejoined Hereford United on loan in January 2006 but was released by Walsall following the club's relegation from League One at the end of the 2005–06 season. He signed with AFC Bournemouth and was loaned out to Bury, before dropping out of the English Football League. He spent the 2006–07 season with Tamworth in the Conference and was then with Halifax Town for the following campaign. He spent the remainder of his career with Kettering Town, Halesowen Town, Hinckley United, Chippenham Town and Sutton Coldfield Town. He later became a fitness coach with Mansfield Town, Port Vale and Shrewsbury Town.

== Playing career ==
=== Walsall ===
Taylor made his first-team debut for Walsall on 7 August 2004, scoring a goal in a 3–2 win over Port Vale at the Bescot Stadium. He started the next game three days later and scored the opening goal as the "Saddlers" recorded a 2–2 draw at AFC Bournemouth. He also scored in his third appearance, a 5–3 defeat at Oldham Athletic. Despite this start, he never scored again in the English Football League. Manager Paul Merson gave him a one-year contract extension in September 2004. Taylor joined Conference National club Hereford United on a one-month loan on 24 March 2005, which was later extended into a three-month loan. However, his loan spell at Edgar Street was curtailed due to a knee ligament injury. The knee injury required two operations and left him sidelined for seven months.

He rejoined Hereford United on loan on 12 January 2006. He featured 11 times for Graham Turner's "Bulls", before returning to end the season with Walsall. He played 13 games for Walsall in the 2005–06 season, who were relegated out of League One. He was released by manager Richard Money in May 2006.

=== Later career ===
Taylor joined Bournemouth on a month-to-month deal on 6 June 2006. Assistant manager Richard O'Kelly had previously tried to sign Taylor whilst he was coaching at West Bromwich Albion. This time he succeeded in bringing in Taylor, who turned down an opportunity in New Zealand and offers from Conference and League Two clubs. He was loaned out to Bury and had a goal ruled out for offside on his debut in a 1–0 defeat to Torquay United at Gigg Lane on 9 September 2006. He started two games and made three substitute appearances for the "Shakers", but manager Chris Casper decided not to extend his loan deal.

Taylor signed with Conference side Tamworth after an unsuccessful trial with Burton Albion in October 2006. He scored four goals in 23 league games for Tamworth in the 2006–07 season. On 7 June 2007, it was reported that Taylor had moved on from the "Lambs" and joined Halifax Town, with manager Chris Wilder looking to add pace to his team. However, Tamworth confirmed that Taylor had in fact not signed for Halifax Town, who had been misinformed by an agent. However, the transfer would eventually go through and Taylor spent the 2007–08 season at The Shay, scoring one goal in 23 games for the "Shaymen".

He played nine games for Southern League Premier Division club Halesowen Town, but also received "seven-day approaches" from Hinckley United manager Dean Thomas and Hednesford Town in September 2008. Two months later he tore his hamstring playing in the Conference North for Hinckley United and was ruled out of action for three months. He returned to Halesowen Town in March 2009, with manager Morell Maison stating that "Daryl has fallen out of the pro game and that left him disillusioned but he is still only 23". He scored one goal in ten games for the "Yeltz" during the 2010–11 season. He made his debut for Chippenham Town in the FA Trophy on 16 October 2010.

== Style of play ==
Taylor was a pacey right-sided winger who struggled to fully recover from a knee injury sustained early in his career.

== Coaching career ==
Taylor was promoted to assistant manager at Sutton Coldfield Town by manager Neil Tooth following Ross Thorpe's departure in September 2013. He joined Mansfield Town as the club's new strength and conditioning coach in 2015, where he remained until a backroom reshuffle in September 2019. He joined Port Vale as a sports science and fitness coach in March 2021. He left the club following a backroom restructure under new manager Darren Moore in May 2024. In July 2024, he was appointed as the fitness coach at Shrewsbury Town.

== Personal life ==
His younger brother, Corey Blackett-Taylor, turned professional at Aston Villa in 2016.

== Career statistics ==
Appearances and goals by club, season and competition
Club	Season	League			FA Cup		EFL Cup		Other		Total	
Club	Season	Division	Apps	Goals	Apps	Goals	Apps	Goals	Apps	Goals	Apps	Goals
Walsall	2004–05	League One	19	3	1	0	0	0	2 (Note: Appearance(s) in the Football League Trophy.)	0	22	3
Walsall	2005–06	League One	11	0	1	0	0	0	1	0	13	0
Walsall	Total		30	3	2	0	0	0	3	0	35	3
Hereford United (loan)	2004–05	Conference National	5	0	0	0	—		0	0	5	0
Hereford United (loan)	2005–06	Conference National	10	0	0	0	—		1 (Note: Appearance(s) in the FA Trophy.)	0	11	0
Hereford United (loan)	Total		15	0	0	0	0	0	1	0	16	0
AFC Bournemouth	2006–07	League One	0	0	0	0	0	0	0	0	0	0
Bury (loan)	2006–07	League Two	4	0	0	0	1	0	0	0	5	0
Tamworth	2006–07	Conference National	23	4	3	0	—		0	0	26	4
Halifax Town	2007–08	Conference Premier	21	1	1	0	—		1 (Note: Appearance(s) in the Conference League Cup.)	0	23	1
Kettering Town	2008–09	Conference Premier	2	0	0	0	—		0	0	2	0
Halesowen Town	2010–11	Southern League; Premier Division	10	1	0	0	—		0	0	10	1
Career total			105	9	6	0	1	0	5	0	117	9
