= Mickleover F.C. =

Association football club in Derby, England

Coordinates: 52°55′25″N 1°32′24″W

- Full name: Mickleover Football Club
- Nickname: Sports
- Founded: 1948
- Ground: Station Road
- Capacity: 1,500 (280 seated)
- Chairman: Don Amott
- Manager: Gareth Holmes
- League: Northern Premier League Division One Midlands
- 2025–26: Northern Premier League Division One Midlands, 15th of 22
Home colours	Away colours

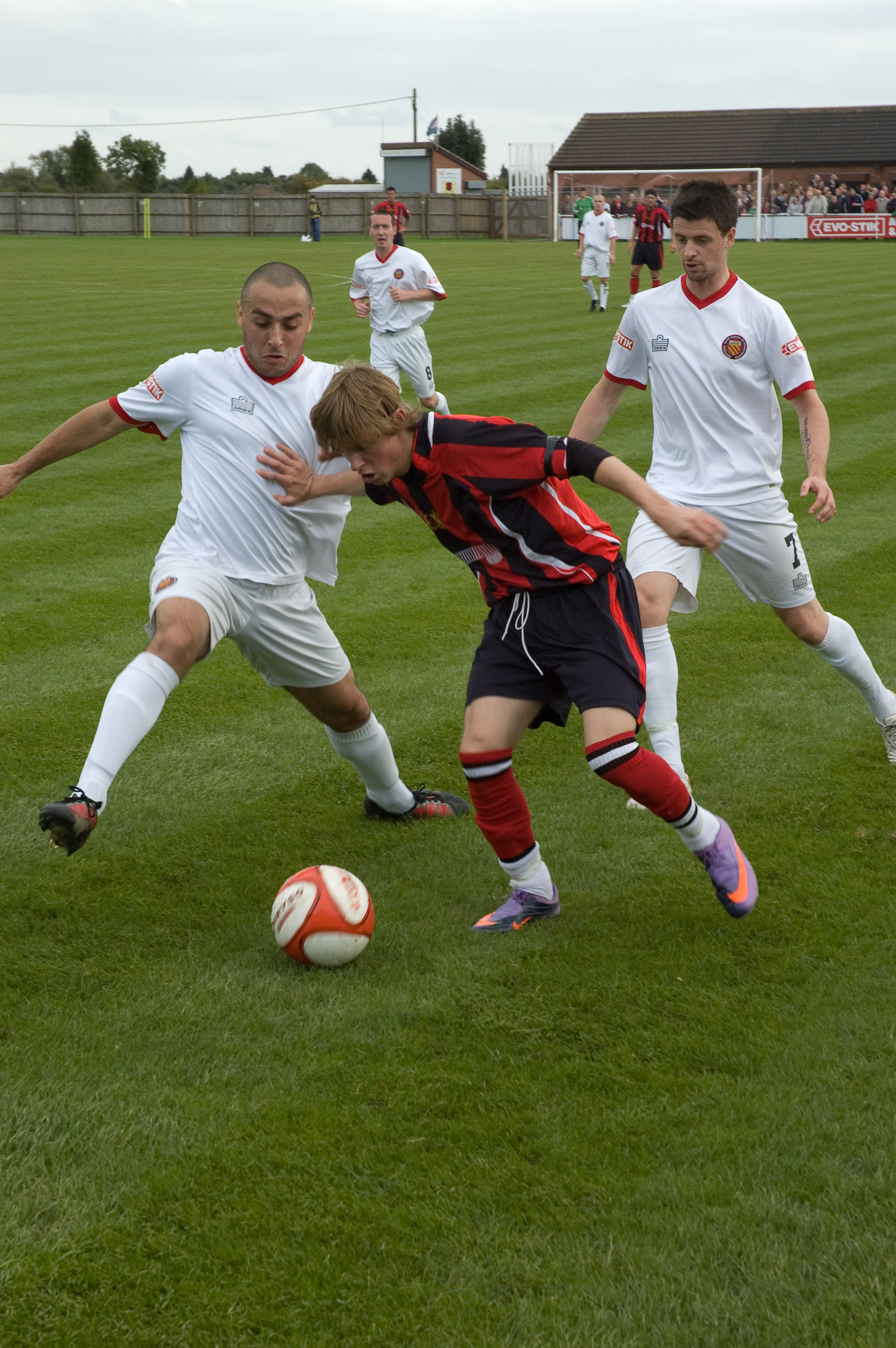
Mickleover (in red) playing FC United of Manchester

Mickleover Football Club is a football club based in the Mickleover suburb of Derby, Derbyshire, England. They are currently members of the Northern Premier League Division One Midlands and play at Station Road. The club were formed as Mickleover Old Boys in 1948, before becoming Mickleover Sports in the 1990s. In 2020 the club dropped "Sports" from its name.

== History ==
The club was established in 1948 as Mickleover Old Boys. They joined the Derby & District Senior League, where they played until moving up to the Premier Division of the Central Midlands League in 1993. The club was then renamed Mickleover Sports. A fourth-place finish in the Premier Division in 1994–95 saw them promoted to the Supreme Division. In 1998–99 they were Supreme Division champions, earning promotion to Division One of the Northern Counties East League. The club went on to win Division One and the league's Trophy in 2002–03 and were promoted to the Premier Division.

The 2006–07 season saw Mickleover win the League Cup, beating Garforth Town in the final on penalties. In 2008–09 they were Premier Division champions, earning promotion to Division One South of the Northern Premier League. The club went on to win Division One South the following season, securing a second successive promotion, this time to the Premier Division of the Northern Premier League. They also won the league's Chairman's Cup with a win over FC Halifax Town. However, the club were relegated back to Division One South at the end of the 2011–12 season. A fifth-place finish in 2013–14 saw them qualify for the promotion play-offs. After beating Coalville Town 3–2 in the semi-finals, they lost the final 1–0 to Belper Town.

Following their play-off final defeat, Mickleover went on to win Division One South the following season, earning promotion back to the Premier Division. On 1 June 2020 they were renamed Mickleover Football Club. In 2022 the club were transferred to the Premier Division Central of the Southern League. They finished fifth in the division in 2023–24, before losing 2–0 to AFC Telford United in the play-off semi-finals. At the end of the season they were transferred back to the Premier Division of the Northern Premier League. After finishing third from bottom of the Premier Division in 2024–25 the club were relegated to Division One Midlands.

== Ground ==
The club play at the Mickleover Sports Ground. Plans to develop the ground began in 1982, although work did not start until 1992. The new ground opened in 1993. An artificial pitch was installed in 2021.

The ground has capacity for 1,500 spectators, 280 of which are seated, and is also used by Derby County Women.

== Managerial history ==
Period	Manager
1993–1996	(England) Tony Shaw
1996–2003	(England) Mark Kelsey
2003–2007	(England) Martin Rowe
2007–2012	(England) Dick Pratley
2012–2013	(England) Charlie Palmer (caretaker)
2013–2016	(England) Glen Kirkwood (England) Craig Hopkins
2016–2024	(Republic of Ireland) John McGrath
2024–	(England) Gareth Holmes
Source: Mickleover FC

== Honours ==
- Northern Premier League
  - Division One South champions 2009–10, 2014–15
  - Chairman's Cup winners 2009–10
- Northern Counties East League
  - Premier Division champions 2008–09
  - Division One champions 2002–03
  - League Cup winners 2006–07
  - Trophy winners 2002–03
- Central Midlands League
  - Supreme Division champions 1998–99

== Records ==
- Best FA Cup performance: Third qualifying round, 2010–11, 2014–15, 2018–19, 2020–21, 2023–24
- Best FA Trophy performance: Third round, 2023–24
- Best FA Vase performance: Fourth round, 2000–01

== See also ==
- Mickleover F.C. players
- Mickleover F.C. managers
