= Ben Wharton =

English amateur footballer

Personal information
- Full name: Benjamin Wharton
- Date of birth: 17 June 1990 (age 36)
- Place of birth: Stockport, England
- Position: Striker

Youth career
- Stockport County
- Rochdale

Senior career*
Years	Team	Apps	(Gls)
2007–2008	Rochdale	1	(0)
2008	Mossley		
2008	Northwich Victoria		
2008	Buxton		
2008–2009	Atherton Collieries	16	(3)
2009–2013	Radcliffe Borough		
2013–2016	Warrington Town		
2016	Ashton United		
2016	Colne		
2016–2017	Bamber Bridge		
2017	Brighouse Town		
2017	Droylsden		
2017	Curzon Ashton		
2018–2020	Radcliffe		
2020	Runcorn Linnets		
2020–2021	Stalybridge Celtic	0	(0)
2021	Widnes	6	(1)
2021–2023	Bury AFC	33	(14)
2023-2024	Avro FC		
2024-	West Didsbury & Chorlton A.F.C		
- * Club domestic league appearances and goals

Ben Wharton is an English semi-professional footballer. He plays as striker.

== Early career and Football League appearance ==
He started out at Stockport County's youth academy and came through the ranks. After he was released at the age of 16 by Stockport he signed a YTS for Rochdale. He came off the bench against Accrington Stanley, in the 90th minute, to make his debut. Wharton didn't play another minute for the club that season and was released at the end of the 2007-08 season. He joined West Didsbury and Chorlton AFC for 2024/25.

== Non-league football career ==
=== Mossley ===
He then made two appearances for Mossley, both as substitute.

=== Northwich Victoria ===
He was signed by Northwich Victoria in October 2008.

=== Buxton ===
A move to Buxton followed in November 2008.

=== Atherton Collieries ===
Between September 2008 and February 2009, Ben represented Atherton Collieries, scoring 3 goals in 16 appearances.

=== Radcliffe Borough ===
He joined Radcliffe Borough in March 2009, but left in 2013.

=== Warrington Town ===
His next club was Warrington Town. His time at the club included being part of the FA Cup victory against Exeter City in November 2014. He left the club in January 2016.

=== Ashton United ===
In January 2016 he moved to Ashton United.

=== Colne ===
His next move was to Colne

=== Bamber Bridge ===
His next move was to Bamber Bridge

=== Brighouse Town ===
His next move was to Brighouse Town. He left the club in January 2017.

=== Droylsden ===
His next move in July 2017 took him to Droylsden.

=== Curzon Ashton ===
In August 2017 he moved to Curzon Ashton.

=== Radcliffe ===
He returned to his former club in 2018, remaining for two seasons. In his two spells with the club he made 263 appearances scoring 87 goals.

=== Runcorn Linnets ===
Wharton joined Runcorn Linnets in January 2020

=== Stalybridge Celtic ===
In December 2020 he signed for Stalybridge Celtic but never appeared for the club.

=== Widnes ===
In July 2021 he signed for Widnes.

=== Bury AFC ===
In September he moved to Bury AFC. He was awarded the North West Counties Football League First Division player of the month award for October. On 27 March 2022, Wharton scored the second goal for Bury AFC in a 4–0 victory over St Helens Town that saw Bury AFC crowned champions of the NWCFL Division 1 North.

During the 22/23 season Wharton scored 10 goals in 47 appearances for Bury AFC.

=== Avro ===
In September 2023 he signed for Avro FC

== Style of play ==
A lower league write up in 'When Saturday Comes' likened Wharton's appearance and playing style to Iain Dowie.

== Honours ==
Bury AFC

- NWCFL Division One North: 2021–22
