= Throstle Nest =

Football ground in West Yorkshire, England

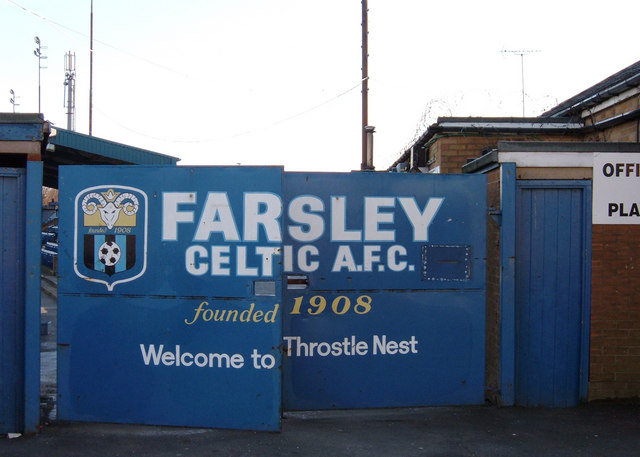
- Main gate, 2007
- Interactive map of Throstle Nest
- Full name: Throstle Nest
- Former names: The Citadel (2019–2025)
- Location: Newlands; Farsley; Leeds; West Yorkshire
- Coordinates: 53°48′35″N 1°39′51″W
- Owner: Leeds City Council
- Operator: FC Farsley
- Capacity: 3,900 (400 seated)
- Surface: Grass

Construction
- Opened: 1948

Tenants
- Farsley Celtic (1948–2025); Leeds United Women (1989–2013); Albion Sports A.F.C. (2012–2023); FC Farsley (2025–present)

Throstle Nest is a football ground situated in Farsley, in the Metropolitan District of the City of Leeds in England, and is the current home of Yorkshire Amateur Association Football League Supreme Division club FC Farsley. It has a capacity of 3,900, 400 of which are seated. For the 2007–08 season Farsley Celtic agreed to let Leeds Met Carnegie also play at the ground.

== History ==
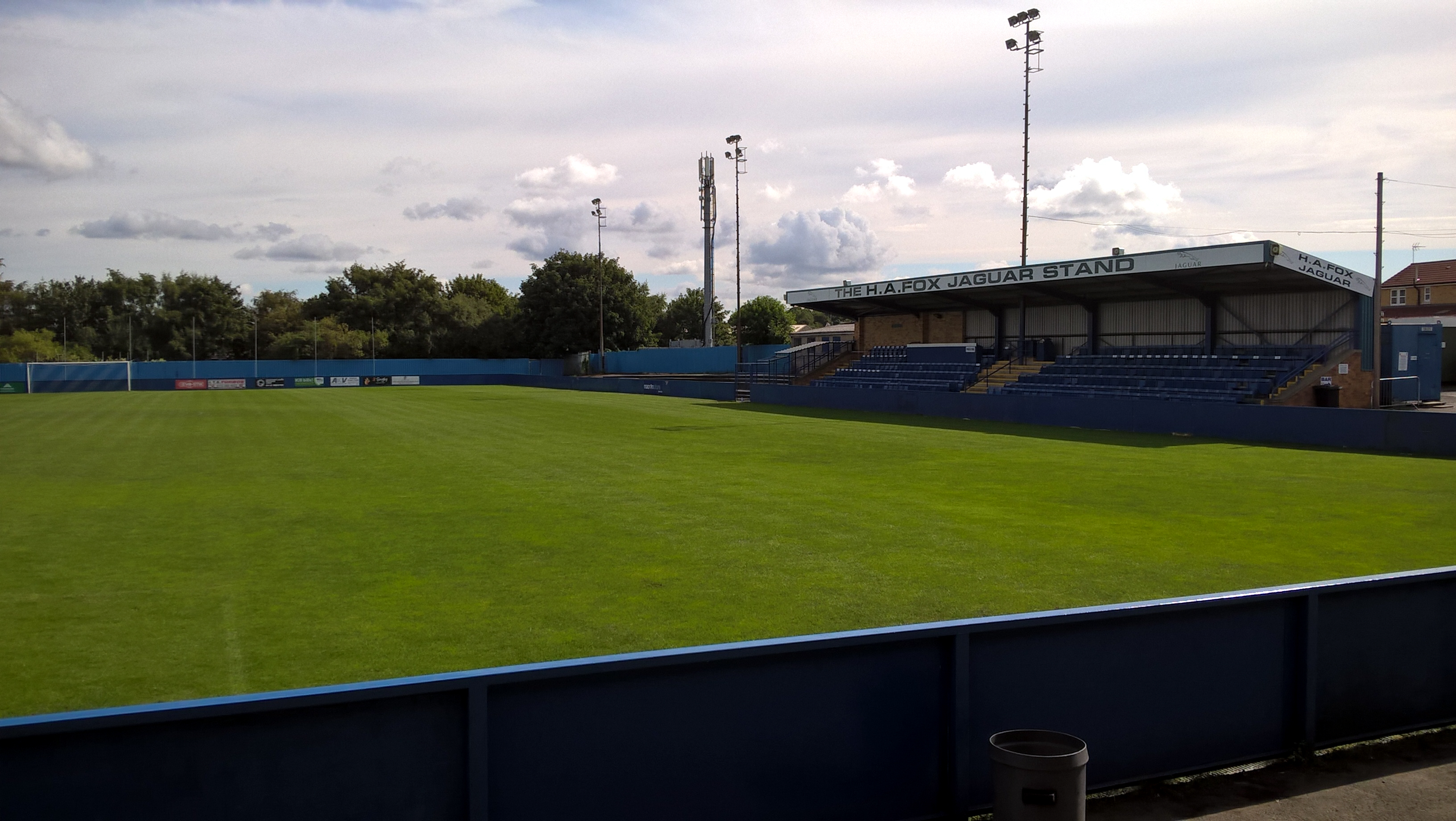
Main Stand, 2017

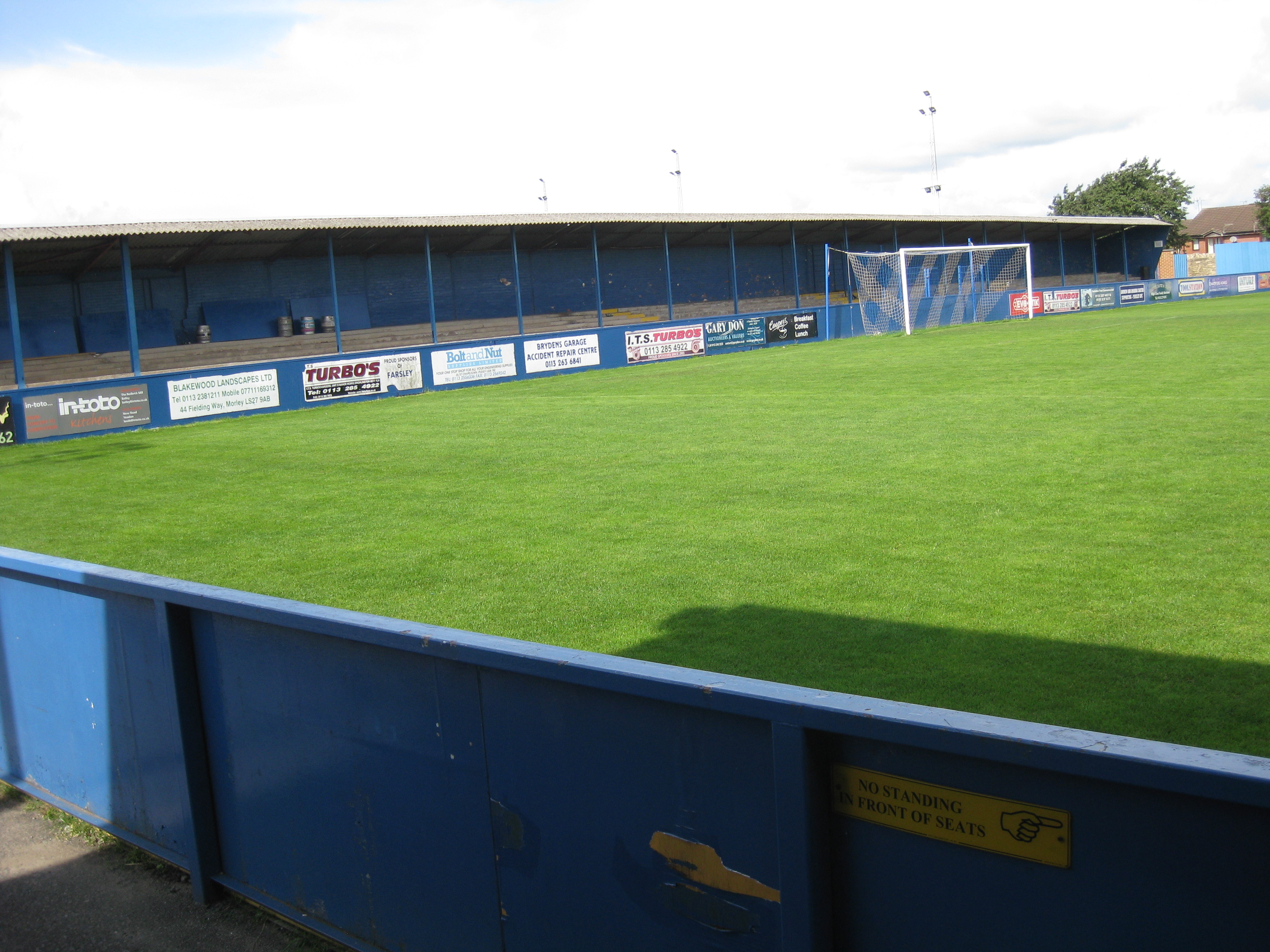
West Stand, 2017

Farsley played their first game at Throstle Nest against Frickley Colliery in 1948 after purchasing it from the local council soon after the war. The club had plans to upgrade the ground in line with their ambitions of achieving football league status, and attracting larger crowds from the wider Leeds area in the process. However, they were relegated after just one season in the Conference Premier (the highest division outside the Football League) and fell back into the Conference North. During the 2009–10 season, the club's debts mounted to £750,000. It was wound up on 12 March 2010 and expelled from the Conference North.

Subsequently, Leeds City Council agreed to purchase Throstle Nest, preserving it for football use in the community. A reformed Farsley club returned to the ground in the 2010–11 season.

Ahead of the 2024–25 season, the club announced plans to lay a new artificial pitch at the Citadel. Delays in the process led to the club failing to play a home match at the ground for the duration of the season. Following confirmation of their relegation, the club announced their intention to lay a new grass pitch, also planning to replace old floodlights.

In March 2025, the ground was protected as a community asset following a successful nomination made by the Farsley Celtic fanbase. FC Farsley kept the stadium when Farsley Celtic went into liquidation on 19 December 2025 and renamed it back to Throstle Nest on 31 December 2025.

== Layout ==
The ground has two stands. The Main Stand is situated on the south of the ground, and backs onto the club shop, changing rooms and the clubhouse. The West Stand, known by fans as the "Shed End" is the most popular for the loyalist Farsley supporters. Situated behind the goal, the opposition goalkeeper regularly endures banter from the home supporters. Both stands are covered and have very few obstructions. There are no stands at the North and East ends of the ground, however fans can stand in these areas unless restrictions or segregation are in force. The dugouts are located in the North end of Throstle Nest.

Outside the ground there is an indoor sports arena, consisting of a gym and indoor sports pitch. Adjacent to that is an outdoor pitch that is used regularly by minor local and junior teams.
