= Butcher's Arms Ground =

Stadium in Droylsden, England

Coordinates: 53°28′55″N 2°08′42″W

- "The Slaughterhouse" "Abattoir"
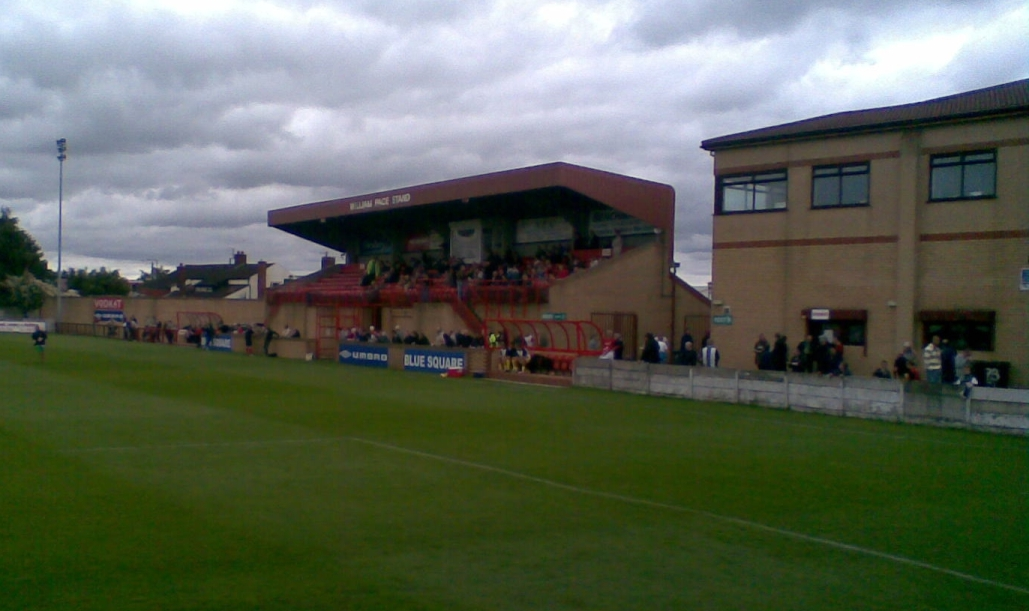
- The main stand at Butcher's Arms Ground
- Interactive map of Butcher's Arms Ground
- Location: Market Street; Droylsden; M43 7AW
- Capacity: 3,000 (500 seated)
- Surface: Grass
- Record attendance: 4,250 (vs. Grimsby Town, 1976)

Construction
- Built: 1892
- Renovated: 1952

Tenants
- Droylsden (1892–1945, 1952–present); Droylsden United (1945–1952); Stretford Paddock FC (2020–present)

Butcher's Arms Ground is a multi-use stadium in Droylsden, Tameside, Greater Manchester, England. It is currently used mostly for football matches and is the home ground of Droylsden F.C. of the North West Counties League Premier Division.The stadium has a capacity of 3,000 people both seated and standing and is nicknamed "The Slaughterhouse" or "Abattoir" by fans. The Butchers reference is celebrated at a designated home game once a year, when the stadium floor is sprinkled with saw dust and fans are invited to wear white overalls and hairnets. During Droylsden's 2010 FA Cup tie against Leyton Orient, broadcast live on ESPN, two fans invaded the pitch at the end of the match dressed as butchers. It has partial or full coverage on three sides of the pitch, terracing on four sides and seating along the centre of one side, plus a public house.

The ground is named after the Butcher's Arms public house, whose landlord in 1892 instigated the formation of Droylsden F.C. to play on land behind the pub, which became the ground. After the Second World War the lease of the Butchers Arms was sold to Belle Vue F.C., who renamed themselves Droylsden United. And that club took over playing at the ground, forcing Drolysden to move to the nearby Moorside Trotting Stadium. However, the town was not big enough to support two clubs, especially with bad feeling between them, and after the local council bought the ground, a merger was negotiated and Drolysden returned to the Butcher's Arms ground in 1952, after it had been renovated and the pitch had been rotated to its present position, finally eradicating a long-standing drainage problem.

The record attendance is 4,250 for an FA Cup first round match between Droylsden and Grimsby Town in 1976.
