= Sutton Coldfield Town F.C. =

Association football club in England

Sutton Coldfield Town
- Full name: Sutton Coldfield Town Football Club
- Nickname: The Royals
- Founded: 1879; 147 years ago
- Ground: Central Ground; Coles Lane; Sutton Coldfield
- Capacity: 2,000
- Coordinates: 52.5568°N 1.8187°W
- Chairman: Nick Thurston
- Manager: Jemiah Richards
- League: Northern Premier League Division One Midlands
- 2024–25: Northern Premier League Division One Midlands, 12th of 21
- Website: sctfc.com
Home colours	Away colours

Sutton Coldfield Town Football Club is an English association football club based in Sutton Coldfield. The club participates in the Northern Premier League Division One Midlands.

Despite being the largest team in a town with a population of over 105,000 people (more than that of the home towns of many full-time professional teams), their profile suffers due to their geographical proximity to Aston Villa, who draw considerable support from the town.

== History ==
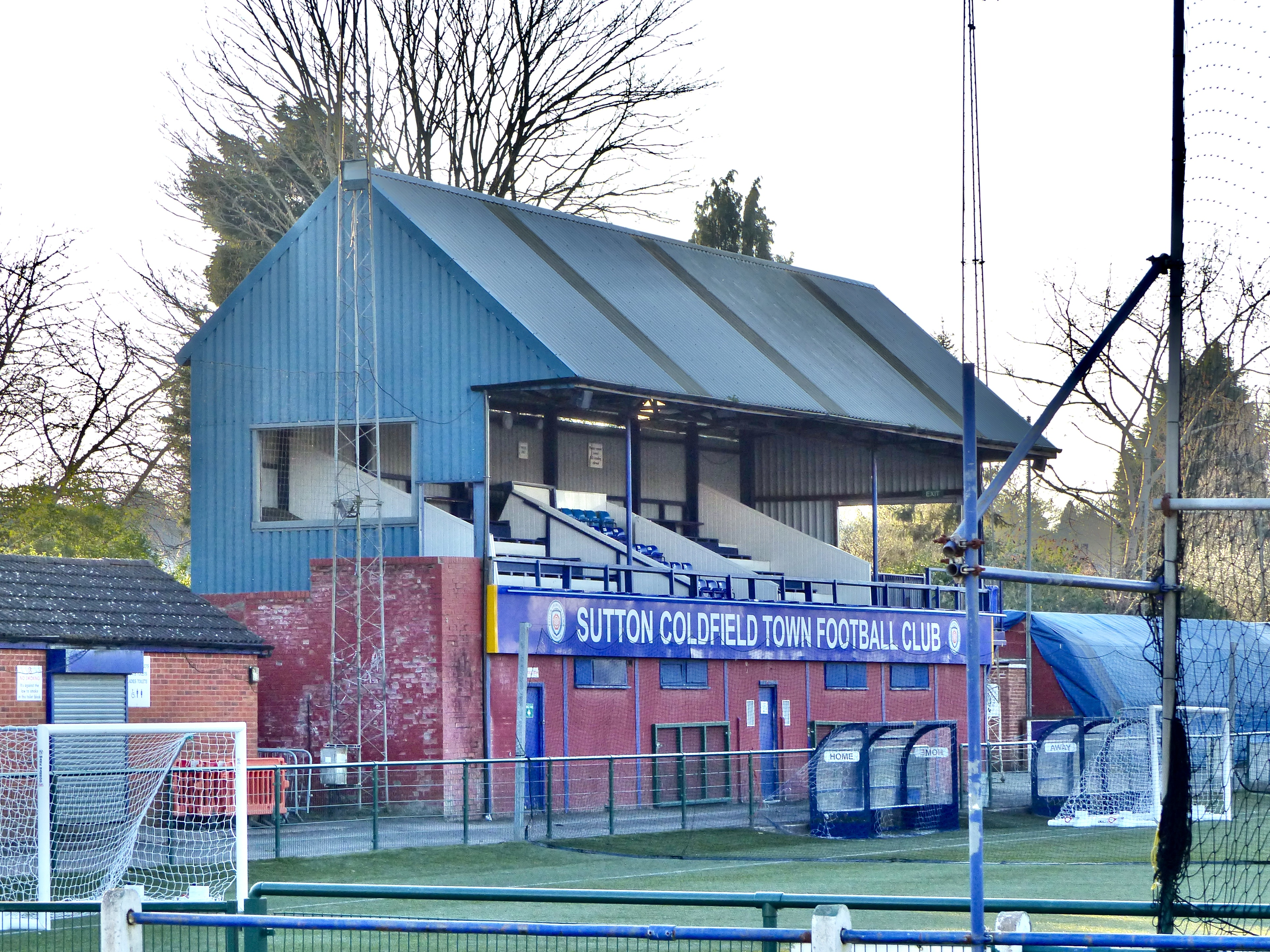
Coles Lane

The club was founded in 1879 and played its first match against the 2nd XI of Birmingham F.C. (no connection to the modern Birmingham City) on 1 February of that year. In their early years, they played in Sutton Park and competed in the Central Birmingham League, Aston and District League, Small Heath League, and Suburban League. In the 1930s, now playing at Coles Lane, they competed in the Birmingham Alliance and Birmingham Combination but met with little success.

After World War II, the club, at the time playing under the name Sutton Town (a name which lasted until 1964), played in the Walsall League and Birmingham Combination before joining the Birmingham & District League (soon to be renamed the West Midlands (Regional) League) in 1954. During the next decade, they struggled in the league with financial problems caused by a devastating fire at their ground forcing them to field only amateur players before switching leagues to the Worcestershire Combination (soon to be renamed the Midland Football Combination) in 1964. They were champions of this league on two occasions before rejoining the West Midlands (Regional) League in 1979, where they were champions at the first attempt. In 1982, after a second-place finish, they stepped up to the Southern League. At the first attempt, they were promoted to the Premier Division but were relegated straight back to the second tier where they remained until the end of the 2009–10 season, before being transferred to the Northern Premier League Division One South.

On 10 May 2011, Sutton Coldfield took part in their first ever Birmingham Senior Cup final, which they won with a 1–0 win over Nuneaton Town. During the summer of 2011, the club installed a new third generation (3G) football pitch. After 12 years at the helm, Chris Keogh resigned as manager in September 2012. His assistant, Neil Tooth, was promoted to the manager's role. In 2015, Sutton won promotion via the play-offs to the Premier Division. In the 2017–18 season, Sutton were relegated with three games remaining after a 2–1 away defeat to Barwell.

== Management and coaching staff ==
=== Current staff ===
Position	Name
Manager	Jemiah Richards
Assistant Manager	Dan Moses
Assistant Manager	James Wren
First Team Coach	Matt Whitehouse

== Managerial history ==
Period	Manager	Notes
2000–2012	Chris Keogh	(Note: "Keogh Steps Down at Sutton Coldfield". Non-League. 2012-09-15.)
2012–2016	Neil Tooth	(Note: "Neil Tooth "gutted" after being sacked by Sutton Coldfield Town". The Non-League Paper. 2016-11-08.)
2016–2018	Richard Sneekes	
2018–2021	Neil Tooth	
2021–2022	Ross Thorpe	
2022–2023	Dave Stringer	
2023-2024	Cameron Stuart	
2024-2025	Cameron Stuart	
2025-2026	Jemiah Richards	

See Sutton Coldfield Town F.C. Managers

== Honours ==
- Birmingham Senior Cup
  - Champions: 2010–2011
  - Runners-up: 2012–2013

== Records ==
- Best league performance: 17th in Southern League Premier Division, 1983–1984
- Best FA Cup performance: First Round Proper, 1980–1981, 1992–1993
- Best FA Trophy performance: Third Round Proper, 2004–2005

== See also ==
- Sutton Coldfield Town F.C. players
- Sutton Coldfield Town F.C. managers

== Sources ==
- Sutton Coldfield Town at the Football Club History Database
