= 2016–17 Northern Premier League =

The 2016–17 season was the 49th season of the Northern Premier League Premier Division, and the tenth season of the Northern Premier League Division One North and South. The League sponsors for 2016–17 were Evo-Stik.

The league constitution was announced on 12 May 2016.

== Premier Division ==
Northern Premier League Premier Division
- Season: 2016–17
- Champions: Blyth Spartans
- Promoted: Blyth Spartans; Spennymoor Town
- Relegated: Corby Town; Frickley Athletic; Ilkeston; Skelmersdale United
- Matches: 552
- Goals: 1,601 (2.9 per match)
- Top goalscorer: Luke Benbow, 32
- Biggest home win: Mickleover Sports 7–0 Ilkeston (26 December 2016); Spennymoor Town 7–0 Skelmersdale United (11 October 2016)
- Biggest away win: Skelmersdale United 1–10 Ashton United (21 March 2017)
- Highest scoring: Skelmersdale United 1–10 Ashton United (21 March 2017)
- Highest attendance: 2127; Halesowen Town 0–1 Stourbridge(7 March 2017)
- Lowest attendance: 78; Sutton Coldfield Town 1–1 Whitby Town(13 August 2016)

The Premier Division featured six new clubs:

- Coalville Town, promoted as playoff winners in NPL Division One South
- Corby Town, relegated from National League North
- Hednesford Town, relegated from National League North
- Stafford Rangers, promoted as champions of NPL Division One South
- Spennymoor Town, promoted as playoff winners in NPL Division One North
- Warrington Town, promoted as champions of NPL Division One North

=== League table ===
| Pos | Team | Pld | W | D | L | GF | GA | GD | Pts | Promotion, qualification or relegation |
|---|---|---|---|---|---|---|---|---|---|---|
| 1 | Blyth Spartans (C, P) | 46 | 31 | 8 | 7 | 114 | 44 | +70 | 101 | Promoted to National League North |
| 2 | Spennymoor Town (P) | 46 | 25 | 12 | 9 | 96 | 48 | +48 | 87 | Qualified for the play-offs, then promoted to National League North (Note: Four teams play for one spot and promotion to National League North / South) |
| 3 | Stourbridge | 46 | 25 | 10 | 11 | 84 | 51 | +33 | 85 | Qualified for the Premier Division play-offs |
| 4 | Workington | 46 | 26 | 5 | 15 | 73 | 56 | +17 | 83 | Qualified for the Premier Division play-offs |
| 5 | Nantwich Town | 46 | 23 | 12 | 11 | 86 | 59 | +27 | 81 | Qualified for the Premier Division play-offs |
| 6 | Whitby Town | 46 | 23 | 10 | 13 | 63 | 56 | +7 | 79 | |
| 7 | Buxton | 46 | 22 | 12 | 12 | 81 | 54 | +27 | 78 | |
| 8 | Grantham Town | 46 | 22 | 10 | 14 | 75 | 57 | +18 | 76 | |
| 9 | Matlock Town | 46 | 22 | 9 | 15 | 68 | 58 | +10 | 75 | |
| 10 | Warrington Town | 46 | 22 | 8 | 16 | 64 | 56 | +8 | 74 | |
| 11 | Ashton United | 46 | 19 | 11 | 16 | 85 | 78 | +7 | 68 | |
| 12 | Rushall Olympic | 46 | 18 | 10 | 18 | 60 | 60 | 0 | 64 | |
| 13 | Stafford Rangers | 46 | 16 | 15 | 15 | 63 | 60 | +3 | 63 | |
| 14 | Barwell | 46 | 16 | 14 | 16 | 58 | 53 | +5 | 62 | |
| 15 | Hednesford Town | 46 | 18 | 7 | 21 | 68 | 65 | +3 | 61 | |
| 16 | Mickleover Sports | 46 | 19 | 3 | 24 | 68 | 71 | −3 | 60 | |
| 17 | Coalville Town | 46 | 15 | 10 | 21 | 71 | 79 | −8 | 55 | |
| 18 | Marine | 46 | 14 | 13 | 19 | 62 | 74 | −12 | 55 | |
| 19 | Halesowen Town | 46 | 13 | 12 | 21 | 46 | 70 | −24 | 51 | |
| 20 | Sutton Coldfield Town | 46 | 12 | 11 | 23 | 49 | 79 | −30 | 47 | |
| 21 | Corby Town (R) | 46 | 12 | 10 | 24 | 49 | 72 | −23 | 46 | Relegated to NPL Division One South |
| 22 | Frickley Athletic (R) | 46 | 12 | 3 | 31 | 47 | 97 | −50 | 39 | Relegated to NPL Division One South |
| 23 | Ilkeston (R) | 46 | 7 | 6 | 33 | 31 | 86 | −55 | 27 | Relegated, then expelled from the league. A New Ilkeston Town Replaced in MFL Division One (Note: Ilkeston wound up due to debts after the end of the season. A New Ilkeston Town Replaced in Midland League Division One.) |
| 24 | Skelmersdale United (R) | 46 | 5 | 9 | 32 | 40 | 118 | −78 | 24 | Relegated to NPL Division One North |

Updated to match(es) played on 26 April 2017. Source: NPL official site
Rules for classification: 1) Points; 2) Goal difference; 3) Number of goals scored; 4) Number of matches won; 5) Head-to-head results
(C) Champions; (P) Promoted; (R) Relegated

=== Top scorers ===
| Rank | Player | Club | Goals |
|---|---|---|---|
| 1 | (England) Luke Benbow | Stourbridge | 32 |
| 2 | (England) Dan Maguire | Blyth Spartans | 30 |
| 3 | (England) Dale Hopson | Whitby Town | 26 |
| 4 | (England) Marcus Dinanga | Matlock Town | 24 |
| 5 | (England) Luke Armstrong | Blyth Spartans | 21 |

Updated to match(es) played on 22 April 2017

=== Results ===
| Home \ Away | ASH | BAR | BLY | BUX | COA | COR | FRK | GRN | HAL | HED | ILK | MAR | MAT | MIC | NAN | RSO | SKU | SPE | STA | STB | SUT | WAR | WTB | WRK |
|---|---|---|---|---|---|---|---|---|---|---|---|---|---|---|---|---|---|---|---|---|---|---|---|---|
| Ashton United | | 0–0 | 1–1 | 1–3 | 3–0 | 3–1 | 1–3 | 4–3 | 2–1 | 2–0 | 1–0 | 1–4 | 1–0 | 3–2 | 1–1 | 1–2 | 1–1 | 1–2 | 2–1 | 0–2 | 3–1 | 2–1 | 3–1 | 1–2 |
| Barwell | 4–1 | | 0–2 | 0–1 | 1–0 | 3–0 | 1–2 | 1–1 | 0–0 | 2–0 | 2–1 | 1–2 | 1–0 | 2–1 | 1–1 | 1–1 | 4–0 | 1–1 | 2–1 | 0–1 | 1–1 | 0–2 | 1–2 | 0–2 |
| Blyth Spartans | 3–3 | 2–0 | | 0–0 | 3–1 | 4–2 | 5–1 | 5–1 | 3–0 | 5–1 | 3–1 | 1–0 | 4–1 | 3–0 | 2–0 | 2–1 | 4–0 | 0–0 | 2–2 | 2–1 | 5–0 | 0–3 | 5–1 | 3–2 |
| Buxton | 1–2 | 0–0 | 2–2 | | 2–1 | 1–0 | 2–0 | 0–1 | 2–0 | 2–0 | 2–0 | 3–0 | 2–1 | 1–0 | 4–1 | 3–0 | 0–0 | 2–2 | 1–3 | 1–1 | 2–1 | 3–3 | 3–0 | 2–1 |
| Coalville Town | 1–3 | 1–2 | 0–1 | 2–1 | | 4–1 | 3–1 | 1–2 | 3–1 | 2–2 | 2–3 | 0–0 | 1–4 | 3–2 | 3–1 | 3–3 | 3–3 | 0–1 | 0–0 | 1–1 | 1–1 | 1–2 | 2–3 | 2–1 |
| Corby Town | 3–3 | 0–2 | 4–3 | 1–1 | 1–2 | | 2–0 | 3–0 | 0–0 | 3–2 | 1–2 | 0–0 | 0–0 | 1–0 | 0–2 | 1–4 | 3–0 | 3–1 | 0–0 | 1–2 | 5–1 | 0–0 | 0–2 | 1–3 |
| Frickley Athletic | 1–3 | 2–3 | 1–0 | 4–4 | 0–4 | 0–2 | | 0–2 | 0–1 | 0–1 | 4–0 | 2–0 | 1–0 | 0–4 | 1–4 | 1–0 | 3–2 | 0–2 | 2–1 | 0–2 | 2–0 | 0–3 | 0–1 | 2–2 |
| Grantham Town | 2–1 | 2–2 | 1–2 | 0–1 | 5–1 | 4–0 | 3–0 | | 2–3 | 4–1 | 1–1 | 3–0 | 0–0 | 1–0 | 0–4 | 2–1 | 1–1 | 3–3 | 2–1 | 2–1 | 2–1 | 1–2 | 2–0 | 2–2 |
| Halesowen Town | 2–2 | 1–1 | 0–5 | 2–4 | 1–0 | 1–1 | 1–2 | 1–1 | | 1–3 | 2–1 | 0–1 | 0–3 | 4–2 | 0–0 | 1–2 | 1–0 | 1–2 | 2–2 | 0–1 | 0–0 | 1–0 | 2–0 | 3–2 |
| Hednesford Town | 2–2 | 1–1 | 1–2 | 1–2 | 1–2 | 3–0 | 4–0 | 1–0 | 1–2 | | 3–1 | 1–1 | 0–2 | 1–0 | 1–2 | 2–1 | 5–0 | 3–1 | 0–2 | 1–1 | 4–1 | 1–0 | 1–1 | 0–2 |
| Ilkeston | 0–2 | 1–0 | 0–5 | 1–0 | 0–0 | 0–1 | 1–0 | 0–3 | 0–0 | 0–2 | | 1–2 | 0–1 | 0–1 | 2–3 | 0–2 | 3–0 | 2–3 | 1–2 | 1–2 | 1–0 | 0–2 | 0–0 | 0–2 |
| Marine | 3–1 | 0–0 | 1–0 | 5–5 | 4–2 | 3–2 | 3–3 | 1–0 | 4–0 | 3–0 | 2–2 | | 0–1 | 1–3 | 1–3 | 1–1 | 3–3 | 1–1 | 1–0 | 1–1 | 1–0 | 1–1 | 1–4 | 0–1 |
| Matlock Town | 3–0 | 2–1 | 0–0 | 3–1 | 0–0 | 1–2 | 1–0 | 2–1 | 2–1 | 2–0 | 0–0 | 2–1 | | 2–2 | 0–4 | 2–1 | 1–1 | 0–4 | 3–0 | 3–1 | 3–1 | 1–1 | 2–1 | 1–2 |
| Mickleover Sports | 4–1 | 4–1 | 1–7 | 0–3 | 1–2 | 2–0 | 3–0 | 2–1 | 0–1 | 0–1 | 7–0 | 2–1 | 2–0 | | 0–1 | 0–2 | 3–1 | 0–5 | 1–3 | 0–4 | 3–1 | 1–0 | 0–1 | 4–0 |
| Nantwich Town | 3–2 | 2–2 | 2–2 | 1–0 | 3–0 | 1–1 | 3–2 | 1–1 | 1–2 | 1–1 | 3–0 | 4–1 | 0–0 | 1–3 | | 1–0 | 4–0 | 1–0 | 0–1 | 2–3 | 1–0 | 4–1 | 0–2 | 0–1 |
| Rushall Olympic | 1–1 | 3–1 | 0–1 | 1–0 | 2–5 | 0–0 | 0–1 | 3–1 | 1–0 | 2–1 | 1–0 | 1–1 | 2–3 | 1–2 | 1–3 | | 1–0 | 1–5 | 1–0 | 0–2 | 3–1 | 2–2 | 1–0 | 1–2 |
| Skelmersdale United | 1–10 | 0–5 | 1–4 | 0–6 | 1–2 | 1–0 | 3–1 | 1–1 | 1–2 | 1–3 | 2–1 | 0–3 | 0–2 | 1–3 | 2–3 | 1–2 | | 0–2 | 1–1 | 0–4 | 1–3 | 4–0 | 0–1 | 0–1 |
| Spennymoor Town | 1–2 | 2–0 | 2–1 | 1–1 | 5–0 | 1–0 | 2–0 | 1–2 | 1–1 | 4–2 | 3–0 | 2–1 | 3–2 | 3–0 | 1–1 | 1–1 | 7–0 | | 1–0 | 2–2 | 3–0 | 4–1 | 0–1 | 4–1 |
| Stafford Rangers | 1–3 | 1–1 | 0–1 | 1–2 | 2–1 | 0–1 | 3–2 | 0–1 | 3–1 | 2–1 | 2–1 | 3–0 | 2–0 | 1–0 | 3–3 | 0–2 | 4–4 | 3–3 | | 0–0 | 0–0 | 2–2 | 0–0 | 3–2 |
| Stourbridge | 4–1 | 2–1 | 1–2 | 3–2 | 2–0 | 1–0 | 4–1 | 1–2 | 2–2 | 1–2 | 3–1 | 2–0 | 5–3 | 0–0 | 4–2 | 0–0 | 2–1 | 1–1 | 2–0 | | 0–1 | 0–1 | 2–1 | 5–0 |
| Sutton Coldfield Town | 2–2 | 2–1 | 3–2 | 1–1 | 0–3 | 5–1 | 3–1 | 0–2 | 1–0 | 0–5 | 1–0 | 3–2 | 2–3 | 0–1 | 1–1 | 0–4 | 2–0 | 1–0 | 1–1 | 4–1 | | 0–1 | 1–1 | 1–1 |
| Warrington Town | 1–1 | 1–2 | 0–2 | 1–0 | 2–1 | 2–1 | 2–1 | 0–1 | 1–0 | 1–0 | 4–1 | 1–0 | 5–3 | 1–0 | 2–3 | 2–0 | 2–0 | 0–2 | 1–2 | 2–0 | 2–1 | | 0–1 | 1–2 |
| Whitby Town | 2–1 | 1–2 | 2–1 | 4–2 | 1–1 | 1–0 | 4–0 | 0–2 | 4–1 | 1–0 | 2–1 | 3–1 | 1–0 | 1–1 | 1–3 | 1–1 | 1–0 | 2–1 | 2–2 | 1–3 | 2–0 | 2–2 | | 1–1 |
| Workington | 1–0 | 0–1 | 0–2 | 2–0 | 0–4 | 1–0 | 2–0 | 1–0 | 1–0 | 0–2 | 2–0 | 4–0 | 1–3 | 4–1 | 3–1 | 2–0 | 0–1 | 3–0 | 1–2 | 3–1 | 0–0 | 3–1 | 4–0 | |

Updated to match(es) played on 22 April 2017. Source: NPL Premier Division results grid
Legend: Blue = home team win; Yellow = draw; Red = away team win.

=== Play-offs ===
Semifinals
2 | Spennymoor Town | 2
5 | Nantwich Town | 0
3 | Stourbridge | 3
4 | Workington | 2

Final
2 | Spennymoor Town | 1
3 | Stourbridge | 0

Semi-finals

| 24 April 2017 | Stourbridge | 3–2 (a.e.t.) | Workington | War Memorial Athletic Ground |
| 19:45 | Stuart Pierpoint 33'; Luke Benbow 76'; Jordan Archer 97' | | David Symington 68'; Daniel Wordsworth 90' | Attendance: 1628 |

| 25 April 2017 | Spennymoor Town | 2–0 | Nantwich Town | The Brewery Field |
| 19:45 | Kallum Griffiths 68'; Andrew Johnson 80' | | | Attendance: 882 |

Final

| 29 April 2017 | Spennymoor Town | 1–0 | Stourbridge | The Brewery Field |
| 15:00 | Robert Ramshaw 30' | | | Attendance: 1699 |

=== Stadia and locations ===
Locations of the 2016–17 Premier Division clubs

| Team | Stadium | Capacity |
|---|---|---|
| Ashton United | Hurst Cross | 4,500 |
| Barwell | Kirkby Road | 2,500 |
| Blyth Spartans | Croft Park | 4,435 |
| Buxton | The Silverlands | 5,200 |
| Coalville Town | Owen Street Sports Ground | 2,000 |
| Corby Town | Steel Park | 3,893 |
| Frickley Athletic | Westfield Lane | 2,087 |
| Grantham Town | South Kesteven Sports Stadium | 7,500 |
| Halesowen Town | The Grove | 5,000 |
| Hednesford Town | Keys Park | 6,500 |
| Ilkeston | New Manor Ground | 3,500 |
| Marine | Marine Travel Arena | 3,185 |
| Matlock Town | Causeway Lane | 2,214 |
| Mickleover Sports | The Don Amott Stadium | 1,500 |
| Nantwich Town | The Weaver Stadium | 3,500 |
| Rushall Olympic | Dales Lane | 1,400 |
| Skelmersdale United | West Lancashire College Stadium | 2,500 |
| Spennymoor Town | The Brewery Field | 4,000 |
| Stafford Rangers | Marston Road | 2,900 |
| Stourbridge | War Memorial Athletic Ground | 2,014 |
| Sutton Coldfield Town | Central Ground | 2,000 |
| Warrington Town | Cantilever Park | 3,500 |
| Whitby Town | Turnbull Ground | 3,500 |
| Workington | Borough Park | 3,101 |

== Division One North ==
Northern Premier League Division One North
- Season: 2016–17
- Champions: Lancaster City
- Promoted: Farsley Celtic; Lancaster City
- Relegated: Burscough
- Matches: 462
- Goals: 1,438 (3.11 per match)
- Top goalscorer: James Walshaw, 32
- Biggest home win: Colne 8–0 Burscough (11 March 2017); Scarborough Athletic 8–0 Mossley (19 November 2016)
- Biggest away win: Ossett Albion 0–6 Trafford (19 November 2016)
- Highest scoring: Hyde United 4–5 Farsley Celtic (4 March 2017); Glossop North End 7–2 Prescot Cables(4 March 2017); Mossley 7–2 Prescot Cables (10 December 2016) (11 goals)
- Highest attendance: 741; Glossop North End 2–5 Lancaster City (22 April 2017)
- Lowest attendance: 50; Burscough 1–3 Kendal Town (25 March 2017)

Two Division One North clubs were moved to the parallel division: Northwich Victoria and Witton Albion were transferred to Division One South.

Thus, Division One North featured six new clubs:

- Colne, promoted from the North West Counties League Premier Division
- Colwyn Bay, relegated from the NPL Premier Division
- Goole, transferred from NPL Division One South
- Hyde United, relegated from the NPL Premier Division
- Ramsbottom United, relegated from the NPL Premier Division
- Tadcaster Albion, promoted from the Northern Counties East League Premier Division

=== League table ===
| Pos | Team | Pld | W | D | L | GF | GA | GD | Pts | Promotion, qualification or relegation |
|---|---|---|---|---|---|---|---|---|---|---|
| 1 | Lancaster City (C, P) | 42 | 27 | 4 | 11 | 73 | 41 | +32 | 85 | Promoted to the NPL Premier Division |
| 2 | Farsley Celtic (P) | 42 | 26 | 6 | 10 | 100 | 50 | +50 | 84 | Qualified for play-offs, then promoted to the NPL Premier Division (Note: Four teams play for one spot and promotion to the NPL Premier Division) |
| 3 | Scarborough Athletic | 42 | 22 | 7 | 13 | 70 | 47 | +23 | 73 | Qualified for Division One North play-offs |
| 4 | Ossett Town | 42 | 22 | 7 | 13 | 69 | 49 | +20 | 73 | Qualified for Division One North play-offs |
| 5 | Colne | 42 | 22 | 7 | 13 | 74 | 50 | +24 | 72 (Note: Colne were deducted one point for contravening league regulations) | Qualified for Division One North play-offs |
| 6 | Trafford | 42 | 18 | 16 | 8 | 80 | 46 | +34 | 70 | |
| 7 | Clitheroe | 42 | 20 | 10 | 12 | 74 | 54 | +20 | 70 | |
| 8 | Glossop North End | 42 | 21 | 6 | 15 | 72 | 70 | +2 | 69 | |
| 9 | Brighouse Town | 42 | 17 | 17 | 8 | 66 | 48 | +18 | 68 | |
| 10 | Hyde United | 42 | 16 | 14 | 12 | 78 | 58 | +20 | 61 (Note: Hyde United were deducted one point for using an illegible player in game against Ossett Town on 29 October 2016) | |
| 11 | Bamber Bridge | 42 | 16 | 7 | 19 | 59 | 58 | +1 | 54 (Note: Bamber Bridge were deducted one point for contravening league regulations) | |
| 12 | Kendal Town | 42 | 14 | 12 | 16 | 61 | 62 | −1 | 54 | |
| 13 | Droylsden | 42 | 14 | 12 | 16 | 71 | 77 | −6 | 54 | |
| 14 | Ramsbottom United | 42 | 16 | 9 | 17 | 64 | 81 | −17 | 53 (Note: Ramsbottom United were deducted four points for contravening league regulations) | |
| 15 | Colwyn Bay | 42 | 13 | 11 | 18 | 61 | 57 | +4 | 50 | |
| 16 | Prescot Cables | 42 | 13 | 11 | 18 | 71 | 81 | −10 | 47 (Note: Prescot Cables were deducted three points for contravening league regulations) | |
| 17 | Mossley | 42 | 14 | 4 | 24 | 67 | 87 | −20 | 46 | |
| 18 | Ossett Albion | 42 | 13 | 6 | 23 | 47 | 78 | −31 | 45 | |
| 19 | Tadcaster Albion | 42 | 11 | 11 | 20 | 57 | 70 | −13 | 44 | |
| 20 | Radcliffe Borough | 42 | 12 | 8 | 22 | 59 | 82 | −23 | 44 | |
| 21 | Goole | 42 | 9 | 9 | 24 | 39 | 83 | −44 | 36 | Reprieved from relegation (Note: Goole were reprieved after Ilkeston, who relegated from Northern Premier League Premier Division having been refused a licence to operate at Step 4.) |
| 22 | Burscough (R) | 42 | 6 | 6 | 30 | 26 | 109 | −83 | 24 | Relegated to the NWCFL Premier Division |

Source: NPL official site
Rules for classification: 1) Points; 2) Goal difference; 3) Number of goals scored; 4) Number of matches won; 5) Head-to-head results
(C) Champions; (P) Promoted; (R) Relegated

=== Top scorers ===
| Rank | Player | Club | Goals |
|---|---|---|---|
| 1 | (England) James Walshaw | Farsley Celtic | 32 |
| 2 | (England) Jordan Connerton | Lancaster City | 28 |
| 3 | (England) Aaron Burns | Trafford | 26 |
| 3 | (England) Michael Fish | Brighouse Town | 26 |
| 4 | (England) Jamie Rainford | Colwyn Bay | 21 |

Updated to match(es) played on 22 April 2017

=== Results ===
| Home \ Away | BAM | BRT | BUR | CLT | CLN | COL | DRO | FAR | GNE | GOO | HYD | KEN | LNC | MOS | OSA | OST | PRC | RAD | RAM | SCA | TAD | TRA |
|---|---|---|---|---|---|---|---|---|---|---|---|---|---|---|---|---|---|---|---|---|---|---|
| Bamber Bridge | | 1–1 | 3–0 | 1–4 | 1–2 | 0–2 | 0–1 | 2–0 | 2–0 | 4–0 | 2–1 | 2–1 | 1–0 | 4–1 | 3–1 | 4–0 | 1–5 | 2–0 | 0–1 | 0–3 | 0–0 | 0–4 |
| Brighouse Town | 2–0 | | 1–1 | 2–1 | 2–2 | 2–1 | 2–3 | 2–1 | 2–2 | 2–1 | 2–0 | 1–1 | 0–1 | 1–1 | 1–1 | 1–1 | 2–1 | 2–0 | 2–2 | 1–1 | 3–3 | 0–0 |
| Burscough | 1–3 | 2–1 | | 0–1 | 1–2 | 0–3 | 1–1 | 0–5 | 0–4 | 2–0 | 0–2 | 1–3 | 0–0 | 1–2 | 0–1 | 0–1 | 0–5 | 1–2 | 0–2 | 1–0 | 2–1 | 0–3 |
| Clitheroe | 3–1 | 3–1 | 0–0 | | 2–2 | 1–0 | 3–2 | 1–3 | 2–3 | 2–0 | 2–1 | 0–0 | 1–2 | 2–1 | 2–0 | 0–3 | 1–2 | 1–1 | 4–0 | 3–0 | 3–1 | 1–1 |
| Colne | 1–0 | 0–0 | 8–0 | 2–1 | | 2–1 | 0–0 | 2–3 | 0–2 | 4–0 | 1–2 | 3–2 | 0–2 | 2–1 | 1–2 | 2–1 | 5–1 | 2–2 | 0–1 | 1–0 | 4–1 | 1–3 |
| Colwyn Bay | 1–1 | 1–2 | 6–0 | 3–2 | 1–1 | | 4–0 | 2–2 | 1–2 | 2–2 | 3–1 | 1–2 | 2–0 | 0–4 | 1–1 | 0–2 | 2–1 | 2–2 | 1–2 | 0–1 | 0–0 | 1–1 |
| Droylsden | 0–1 | 1–2 | 4–1 | 1–2 | 2–1 | 2–4 | | 1–1 | 1–3 | 3–1 | 1–3 | 2–2 | 1–0 | 1–3 | 2–1 | 6–1 | 2–2 | 3–3 | 1–1 | 2–2 | 4–3 | 0–3 |
| Farsley Celtic | 5–3 | 3–2 | 3–1 | 2–4 | 2–1 | 1–0 | 1–1 | | 4–1 | 1–2 | 2–1 | 1–0 | 2–4 | 3–1 | 2–1 | 0–2 | 2–1 | 4–0 | 0–0 | 2–1 | 5–1 | 0–1 |
| Glossop North End | 1–1 | 2–0 | 2–3 | 1–0 | 1–0 | 2–1 | 2–2 | 0–2 | | 2–0 | 1–0 | 3–2 | 2–5 | 3–2 | 3–2 | 2–1 | 3–1 | 2–4 | 2–1 | 2–1 | 3–1 | 2–2 |
| Goole | 0–3 | 0–3 | 4–1 | 0–1 | 1–3 | 3–1 | 2–0 | 0–3 | 2–1 | | 0–0 | 1–2 | 1–1 | 1–1 | 1–1 | 0–3 | 1–2 | 0–1 | 4–2 | 1–1 | 0–0 | 1–3 |
| Hyde United | 2–2 | 0–0 | 3–2 | 4–4 | 2–2 | 2–2 | 2–0 | 4–5 | 2–1 | 4–0 | | 3–0 | 1–2 | 1–2 | 0–0 | 2–2 | 1–1 | 1–1 | 5–0 | 3–2 | 2–0 | 2–2 |
| Kendal Town | 2–0 | 1–2 | 4–0 | 0–3 | 0–1 | 1–2 | 5–0 | 0–5 | 2–2 | 1–1 | 1–1 | | 1–0 | 3–0 | 1–2 | 1–0 | 3–1 | 1–1 | 2–1 | 2–1 | 2–2 | 1–1 |
| Lancaster City | 3–2 | 2–3 | 3–1 | 0–0 | 1–2 | 1–1 | 1–3 | 3–2 | 3–0 | 1–0 | 1–0 | 3–0 | | 4–3 | 2–0 | 0–2 | 2–0 | 3–1 | 3–1 | 2–0 | 1–0 | 0–1 |
| Mossley | 2–0 | 0–4 | 4–0 | 2–1 | 0–1 | 0–3 | 3–4 | 0–2 | 2–1 | 0–1 | 1–4 | 2–2 | 0–1 | | 1–3 | 0–2 | 7–2 | 2–1 | 2–1 | 0–2 | 0–1 | 1–4 |
| Ossett Albion | 1–4 | 0–4 | 4–0 | 2–2 | 0–1 | 3–1 | 0–4 | 0–0 | 2–1 | 1–2 | 0–3 | 2–4 | 0–1 | 2–1 | | 1–0 | 3–0 | 2–0 | 0–4 | 0–1 | 2–5 | 0–6 |
| Ossett Town | 2–0 | 4–2 | 3–0 | 1–2 | 1–2 | 1–0 | 1–3 | 3–2 | 1–0 | 0–2 | 1–1 | 2–0 | 1–3 | 1–0 | 0–2 | | 3–1 | 1–1 | 1–1 | 4–2 | 3–1 | 1–1 |
| Prescot Cables | 1–1 | 0–0 | 4–0 | 2–2 | 3–2 | 0–1 | 0–0 | 0–3 | 7–2 | 2–2 | 0–4 | 1–1 | 2–0 | 0–5 | 5–0 | 2–0 | | 1–1 | 2–4 | 0–2 | 1–0 | 2–0 |
| Radcliffe Borough | 1–0 | 0–3 | 0–1 | 0–1 | 1–3 | 3–0 | 1–2 | 0–5 | 1–2 | 5–1 | 4–0 | 3–1 | 0–3 | 3–4 | 2–1 | 0–4 | 1–5 | | 2–1 | 2–3 | 2–3 | 2–0 |
| Ramsbottom United | 1–0 | 2–0 | 2–2 | 3–4 | 0–3 | 1–3 | 3–2 | 0–7 | 2–2 | 3–1 | 1–3 | 1–0 | 1–0 | 4–2 | 2–1 | 0–5 | 1–1 | 4–0 | | 0–4 | 3–3 | 0–2 |
| Scarborough Athletic | 0–0 | 0–1 | 5–0 | 1–0 | 1–0 | 1–0 | 3–1 | 1–4 | 1–0 | 2–0 | 3–2 | 1–0 | 1–3 | 8–0 | 2–1 | 0–0 | 4–1 | 1–3 | 3–2 | | 1–0 | 1–1 |
| Tadcaster Albion | 2–1 | 1–1 | 0–0 | 1–0 | 1–2 | 0–0 | 2–1 | 0–0 | 2–1 | 3–0 | 1–2 | 1–2 | 1–2 | 2–3 | 3–0 | 0–1 | 2–2 | 2–1 | 0–1 | 2–3 | | 4–3 |
| Trafford | 0–3 | 1–1 | 4–0 | 2–2 | 2–0 | 2–1 | 1–1 | 1–0 | 0–1 | 6–0 | 1–1 | 2–2 | 1–4 | 1–1 | 0–1 | 2–3 | 5–1 | 2–1 | 2–2 | 0–0 | 3–1 | |

Updated to match(es) played on 22 April 2017. Source: NPL First Division North results grid
Legend: Blue = home team win; Yellow = draw; Red = away team win.

=== Play-offs ===
Semifinals
2 | Farsley Celtic | 4
5 | Colne | 0
3 | Scarborough Athletic | 1
4 | Ossett Town | 3

Final
2 | Farsley Celtic | 4
4 | Ossett Town | 2

Semi-finals

| 25 April 2017 | Farsley Celtic | 4–0 | Colne | Throstle Nest |
| 19:45 | Aiden Savory 26'; James Walshaw 43'; Adam Clayton 45'; Lewis Nightingale 81' | | | Attendance: 405 |

| 25 April 2017 | Scarborough Athletic | 1–3 | Ossett Town | Queensgate |
| 19:45 | Adam Bolder 48' | | Jason Yates 35', 59'; Ashley Jackson 64' | Attendance: 1,004 |

Final

| 29 April 2017 | Farsley Celtic | 4–2 (a.e.t.) | Ossett Town | Throstle Nest |
| 15:00 | Christopher Howarth 47'; Richard Marshall 90'; Ryan Watson 110'; James Walshaw 112' | | Danny Frost 70', 87' | Attendance: 829 |

=== Stadia and locations ===
Locations of 2016–17 Northern Premier League Division One North teams
Locations of Northern Premier League 2016–17 Division One North teams (Greater Manchester)

| Team | Stadium | Capacity |
|---|---|---|
| Bamber Bridge | QED Stadium | 2,264 |
| Brighouse Town | St Giles' Road | 1,000 |
| Burscough | Victoria Park | 3,054 |
| Clitheroe | Shawbridge | 2,000 |
| Colne | XLCR Stadium | 1,800 |
| Colwyn Bay | (Wales) Llanelian Road | 2,500 |
| Droylsden | Butcher's Arms Ground | 3,000 |
| Glossop North End | The Arthur Goldthorpe Stadium | 1,350 |
| Goole | Victoria Pleasure Grounds | 3,000 |
| Hyde United | Ewen Fields | 4,250 |
| Farsley Celtic | Throstle Nest | 3,900 |
| Kendal Town | Lakeland Radio Stadium | 2,400 |
| Lancaster City | Giant Axe | 3,500 |
| Mossley | Seel Park | 4,000 |
| Ossett Albion | Our Physio Stadium | 3,000 |
| Ossett Town | 4G Voice & Data Stadium | 2,000 |
| Prescot Cables | Volair Park | 3,200 |
| Radcliffe Borough | Stainton Park | 3,500 |
| Ramsbottom United | The Harry Williams Riverside | 2,000 |
| Scarborough Athletic | Flamingo Land Stadium | 2,000 |
| Tadcaster Albion | Ings Lane | 1,500 |
| Trafford | Shawe View | 2,500 |

== Division One South ==
Northern Premier League Division One South
- Season: 2016–17
- Champions: Shaw Lane
- Promoted: Shaw Lane; Witton Albion
- Relegated: Northwich Victoria; Rugby Town
- Matches: 462
- Goals: 1,395 (3.02 per match)
- Top goalscorer: Gavin Allott, 25
- Biggest home win: Sheffield 9–0 Market Drayton Town(28 March 2017)
- Biggest away win: Lincoln United 0–6 Shaw Lane(10 January 2017)
- Highest scoring: Sheffield 9–0 Market Drayton Town(28 March 2017); Kidsgrove Athletic 7–2 Lincoln United(28 March 2017)
- Highest attendance: 689; AFC Rushden & Diamonds 2–2 Basford United(22 October 2017)
- Lowest attendance: 65; Carlton Town 1–0 Market Drayton Town(1 April 2017)

Division One South featured five new clubs:

- AFC Rushden & Diamonds, transferred from Southern League Division One Central
- Bedworth United, relegated from Southern League Premier Division
- Northwich Victoria, transferred from NPL Division One North
- Stamford, relegated from NPL Premier Division
- Witton Albion, transferred from NPL Division One North

=== League table ===
| Pos | Team | Pld | W | D | L | GF | GA | GD | Pts | Promotion, qualification or relegation |
|---|---|---|---|---|---|---|---|---|---|---|
| 1 | Shaw Lane (C, P) | 42 | 32 | 6 | 4 | 104 | 36 | +68 | 102 | Promoted to the NPL Premier Division |
| 2 | Witton Albion (O, P) | 42 | 31 | 6 | 5 | 100 | 41 | +59 | 96 (Note: Witton Albion were deducted three points for fielding an ineligible player against Stocksbridge Park Steels on 11 February (2–0)) | Qualified for play-offs, then promoted to the NPL Premier Division |
| 3 | Spalding United | 42 | 24 | 7 | 11 | 74 | 42 | +32 | 79 | Qualified for Division One South play-offs (Note: Four teams play for one spot and promotion to the NPL Premier Division) |
| 4 | Stocksbridge Park Steels | 42 | 22 | 7 | 13 | 67 | 50 | +17 | 73 | Qualified for Division One South play-offs |
| 5 | AFC Rushden & Diamonds | 42 | 20 | 11 | 11 | 73 | 52 | +21 | 71 | Qualified for play-offs, then transferred to Southern League Division One East |
| 6 | Basford United | 42 | 20 | 13 | 9 | 78 | 53 | +25 | 70 (Note: Basford United were deducted three points for fielding an ineligible player against Stocksbridge Park Steels on 10 September (3–2).) | |
| 7 | Newcastle Town | 42 | 21 | 4 | 17 | 59 | 59 | 0 | 67 | |
| 8 | Lincoln United | 42 | 19 | 8 | 15 | 67 | 61 | +6 | 65 | |
| 9 | Leek Town | 42 | 18 | 10 | 14 | 63 | 63 | 0 | 64 | |
| 10 | Belper Town | 42 | 15 | 13 | 14 | 55 | 55 | 0 | 58 | |
| 11 | Bedworth United | 42 | 15 | 12 | 15 | 73 | 72 | +1 | 57 | |
| 12 | Kidsgrove Athletic | 42 | 16 | 7 | 19 | 72 | 66 | +6 | 55 | |
| 13 | Romulus | 42 | 14 | 9 | 19 | 65 | 75 | −10 | 51 | |
| 14 | Market Drayton Town | 42 | 16 | 2 | 24 | 60 | 93 | −33 | 50 | |
| 15 | Sheffield | 42 | 13 | 9 | 20 | 62 | 60 | +2 | 48 | |
| 16 | Stamford | 42 | 13 | 9 | 20 | 62 | 80 | −18 | 48 | |
| 17 | Chasetown | 42 | 13 | 8 | 21 | 64 | 75 | −11 | 47 | |
| 18 | Gresley | 42 | 12 | 9 | 21 | 56 | 83 | −27 | 45 | |
| 19 | Carlton Town | 42 | 10 | 12 | 20 | 48 | 68 | −20 | 42 | |
| 20 | Loughborough Dynamo | 42 | 10 | 4 | 28 | 45 | 94 | −49 | 34 | |
| 21 | Rugby Town (R) | 42 | 8 | 6 | 28 | 44 | 77 | −33 | 30 | Relegated to the MFL Premier Division |
| 22 | Northwich Victoria (R) | 42 | 8 | 12 | 22 | 53 | 89 | −36 | 26 (Note: Northwich Victoria were deducted ten points for entering into administration on 10 January.) | Relegated to the NWCFL Premier Division |

Source: NPL official site
Rules for classification: 1) Points; 2) Goal difference; 3) Number of goals scored; 4) Number of matches won; 5) Head-to-head results
(C) Champions; (O) Play-off winners; (P) Promoted; (R) Relegated

=== Top scorers ===
| Rank | Player | Club | Goals |
|---|---|---|---|
| 1 | (England) Gavin Allott | Shaw Lane AFC | 26 |
| 2 | (England) Bradley Wells | Spalding United | 25 |
| 3 | (England) Anthony Malbon | Kidsgrove Athletic | 21 |
| 4 | (England) Daniel Creaney | Bedworth United | 20 |
| 4 | (England) Timothy Grice | Leek Town | 20 |
| 4 | (England) Bradley Bauress | Witton Albion | 20 |

Updated to match(es) played on 22 April 2017

=== Results ===
| Home \ Away | RUS | BAS | BWU | BLP | CAR | CHA | GRE | KID | LEE | LIN | LOU | MAR | NEW | NOR | ROM | RUG | SHL | SHE | SPA | STM | STO | WTN |
|---|---|---|---|---|---|---|---|---|---|---|---|---|---|---|---|---|---|---|---|---|---|---|
| AFC Rushden & Diamonds | | 2–2 | 2–0 | 0–0 | 5–1 | 1–3 | 3–3 | 2–5 | 2–1 | 1–1 | 4–0 | 1–1 | 1–0 | 6–1 | 0–0 | 3–0 | 1–1 | 2–1 | 1–2 | 1–1 | 0–2 | 0–2 |
| Basford United | 3–0 | | 3–3 | 7–1 | 2–1 | 1–2 | 1–0 | 2–0 | 4–2 | 1–1 | 2–1 | 1–0 | 6–0 | 2–2 | 1–0 | 4–0 | 1–0 | 1–1 | 1–0 | 3–2 | 3–2 | 1–2 |
| Bedworth United | 1–2 | 2–2 | | 0–2 | 1–0 | 1–3 | 1–0 | 3–0 | 2–1 | 1–4 | 5–1 | 2–0 | 1–5 | 2–2 | 4–2 | 1–1 | 0–1 | 4–0 | 2–2 | 2–3 | 2–2 | 0–4 |
| Belper Town | 1–4 | 1–1 | 2–3 | | 1–1 | 3–3 | 1–2 | 3–1 | 0–0 | 0–0 | 4–1 | 2–1 | 1–3 | 0–0 | 4–2 | 3–0 | 3–1 | 1–1 | 1–2 | 0–2 | 0–0 | 3–1 |
| Carlton Town | 1–3 | 0–0 | 0–0 | 0–1 | | 3–1 | 2–3 | 0–2 | 0–1 | 1–1 | 3–3 | 1–0 | 2–2 | 2–2 | 1–1 | 1–0 | 1–5 | 1–3 | 4–3 | 4–4 | 1–0 | 3–2 |
| Chasetown | 2–1 | 4–2 | 2–3 | 0–0 | 1–0 | | 5–2 | 1–1 | 0–3 | 1–3 | 5–0 | 5–1 | 1–2 | 1–1 | 0–3 | 1–0 | 1–3 | 0–0 | 1–1 | 1–2 | 1–2 | 1–4 |
| Gresley | 1–2 | 3–0 | 1–2 | 1–1 | 2–1 | 1–0 | | 2–1 | 1–1 | 1–3 | 0–1 | 3–2 | 0–1 | 0–2 | 2–1 | 2–2 | 0–3 | 1–1 | 0–2 | 2–3 | 1–0 | 0–2 |
| Kidsgrove Athletic | 0–1 | 2–1 | 3–4 | 1–3 | 0–2 | 5–0 | 5–1 | | 2–2 | 7–2 | 2–1 | 1–2 | 1–0 | 2–1 | 0–2 | 0–1 | 0–2 | 2–1 | 0–1 | 3–0 | 1–2 | 2–2 |
| Leek Town | 0–1 | 0–5 | 1–1 | 0–1 | 4–1 | 3–2 | 5–1 | 2–2 | | 2–2 | 2–1 | 3–2 | 2–0 | 1–0 | 2–2 | 2–0 | 1–2 | 1–0 | 0–4 | 3–1 | 1–1 | 1–2 |
| Lincoln United | 0–1 | 0–0 | 2–1 | 3–1 | 2–0 | 2–0 | 4–1 | 2–3 | 1–1 | | 3–0 | 2–0 | 2–1 | 2–3 | 1–2 | 1–0 | 0–6 | 2–1 | 0–2 | 1–0 | 0–2 | 1–2 |
| Loughborough Dynamo | 0–3 | 1–2 | 0–3 | 0–2 | 0–0 | 2–0 | 1–1 | 1–4 | 0–2 | 1–0 | | 4–1 | 1–2 | 3–2 | 1–1 | 3–2 | 0–3 | 1–0 | 0–3 | 0–1 | 2–3 | 0–4 |
| Market Drayton Town | 2–1 | 0–1 | 3–2 | 1–0 | 0–3 | 0–3 | 2–1 | 1–3 | 1–2 | 2–1 | 0–3 | | 3–2 | 4–2 | 3–1 | 2–3 | 1–1 | 0–5 | 2–3 | 4–2 | 3–1 | 3–2 |
| Newcastle Town | 1–0 | 3–1 | 2–2 | 1–1 | 2–1 | 3–1 | 3–0 | 2–1 | 1–0 | 0–2 | 1–0 | 2–0 | | 2–1 | 2–1 | 1–0 | 2–3 | 0–1 | 2–1 | 2–1 | 1–3 | 0–2 |
| Northwich Victoria | 1–4 | 2–2 | 2–0 | 1–1 | 1–0 | 2–3 | 2–2 | 3–1 | 0–0 | 1–3 | 1–5 | 0–1 | 1–2 | | 1–2 | 1–3 | 0–4 | 2–5 | 1–3 | 0–0 | 3–0 | 0–5 |
| Romulus | 3–2 | 2–2 | 1–4 | 2–1 | 1–1 | 0–1 | 2–2 | 3–1 | 1–2 | 4–1 | 5–1 | 2–4 | 2–1 | 3–0 | | 0–3 | 2–3 | 1–1 | 1–2 | 4–2 | 0–1 | 1–1 |
| Rugby Town | 1–1 | 1–1 | 3–1 | 0–1 | 0–1 | 2–2 | 1–2 | 1–3 | 1–0 | 1–2 | 0–1 | 0–3 | 2–0 | 0–2 | 1–2 | | 1–2 | 2–3 | 1–2 | 1–2 | 0–1 | 1–2 |
| Shaw Lane | 1–1 | 2–0 | 2–2 | 4–1 | 2–1 | 2–0 | 5–3 | 2–1 | 6–0 | 5–2 | 4–0 | 3–1 | 2–1 | 2–2 | 2–0 | 5–0 | | 2–0 | 3–1 | 3–1 | 1–0 | 1–0 |
| Sheffield | 1–2 | 3–0 | 2–2 | 0–1 | 0–1 | 2–1 | 3–2 | 1–1 | 2–1 | 3–2 | 2–1 | 9–0 | 1–2 | 1–2 | 0–1 | 4–2 | 0–1 | | 0–4 | 1–1 | 1–2 | 0–1 |
| Spalding United | 1–2 | 0–0 | 0–1 | 1–0 | 2–0 | 2–1 | 2–2 | 0–0 | 0–1 | 1–0 | 2–1 | 3–0 | 1–1 | 3–1 | 4–0 | 3–1 | 0–1 | 3–0 | | 2–1 | 2–3 | 0–1 |
| Stamford | 1–1 | 2–3 | 2–1 | 0–1 | 1–1 | 2–1 | 0–1 | 1–1 | 2–3 | 1–3 | 2–0 | 0–2 | 3–1 | 4–0 | 4–2 | 3–2 | 1–1 | 1–1 | 1–2 | | 0–5 | 1–3 |
| Stocksbridge Park Steels | 2–3 | 1–2 | 1–1 | 2–1 | 2–1 | 1–1 | 1–2 | 0–2 | 1–2 | 0–3 | 4–2 | 4–1 | 1–0 | 2–1 | 1–0 | 0–0 | 1–0 | 2–1 | 2–0 | 4–0 | | 3–4 |
| Witton Albion | 2–0 | 2–1 | 1–0 | 2–1 | 2–0 | 3–2 | 3–1 | 3–0 | 5–2 | 0–0 | 4–1 | 3–1 | 3–0 | 1–1 | 5–0 | 3–4 | 3–2 | 1–0 | 2–2 | 4–1 | 0–0 | |

Updated to match(es) played on 22 April 2017. Source: NPL First Division South results grid
Legend: Blue = home team win; Yellow = draw; Red = away team win.

=== Play-offs ===
Semifinals
2 | Witton Albion | 1
5 | Rushden & Diamonds | 0
3 | Spalding United | 3
4 | Stocksbridge Park Steels | 2

Final
2 | Witton Albion | 2
3 | Spalding United | 1

Semi-finals

| 25 April 2017 | Witton Albion | 1–0 | AFC Rushden & Diamonds | Wincham Park |
| 19:45 | Robert Hopley 54' | | | Attendance: 580 |

| 25 April 2017 | Spalding United | 3–2 (a.e.t.) | Stocksbridge Park Steels | Sir Halley Stewart Playing Field |
| 19:45 | Matthew Varley 43'; Lee Beeson 63'; Jonathan Lockie 103' | | Richard Stirrup 47'; Harrison Biggins 78' | Attendance: 448 |

Final

| 29 April 2017 | Witton Albion | 2–1 | Spalding United | Wincham Park |
| 15:00 | Brad Bauress 66'; Anthony Gardner 76' | | Leon Mettam 69' | Attendance: 811 |

=== Stadia and locations ===
Locations of Northern Premier League 2016–17 Division One South teams

| Team | Stadium | Capacity |
|---|---|---|
| AFC Rushden & Diamonds | Dog & Duck | 2,500 |
| Basford United | Greenwich Avenue | 1,000 |
| Bedworth United | The Oval Ground | 3,000 |
| Belper Town | Christchurch Meadow | 2,400 |
| Carlton Town | Bill Stokeld Stadium | 1,500 |
| Chasetown | The Scholars Ground | 2,000 |
| Gresley | The Moat Ground | 2,400 |
| Kidsgrove Athletic | The Seddon Stadium | 2,000 |
| Leek Town | Harrison Park | 3,600 |
| Lincoln United | Ashby Avenue | 2,200 |
| Loughborough Dynamo | Nanpantan Sports Ground | 1,500 |
| Market Drayton Town | Greenfields Sports Ground | 1,000 |
| Newcastle Town | Lyme Valley Stadium | 4,000 |
| Northwich Victoria | Wincham Park (groundshare with Witton Albion) | 4,813 |
| Romulus | The Central Ground (groundshare with Sutton Coldfield Town) | 2,000 |
| Rugby Town | Butlin Road | 6,000 |
| Shaw Lane | Shaw Lane | 2,000 |
| Sheffield | Coach and Horses Ground | 2,000 |
| Spalding United | Sir Halley Stewart Field | 3,500 |
| Stamford | Zeeco Stadium | 2,000 |
| Stocksbridge Park Steels | Look Local Stadium | 3,500 |
| Witton Albion | Wincham Park | 4,813 |

== Challenge Cup ==
2016–17 Northern Premier League Challenge Cup
The Integro League Cup

Tournament details
- Country: England; Wales
- Teams: 68

Final positions
- Champions: Bamber Bridge
- Runners-up: Grantham Town

Tournament statistics
- Matches played: 66

The 2016–17 Northern Premier League Challenge Cup, known as the 16–17 Integro Doodson League Cup for sponsorship reasons, was the 47th season of the Northern Premier League Challenge Cup, the main cup competition in the Northern Premier League. It was sponsored by Doodson Sport for a sixth consecutive season. 67 clubs from England and one from Wales entered the competition, beginning with the preliminary round, and all ties ended after 90 minutes and concluded with penalties.

The defending champions were Marine, who defeated Scarborough Athletic on penalties in the 2016 Final. They were eliminated in the first round.

=== Calendar ===
| Round | Clubs remaining | Clubs involved | Winners from previous round | New entries this round | Scheduled playing date |
|---|---|---|---|---|---|
| Preliminary round | 68 | 8 | 0 | 8 | 13 September 2016 |
| First round | 64 | 64 | 4 | 60 | 14 November – 13 December 2016 |
| Second round | 32 | 32 | 32 | none | 7 January – 1 February 2017 |
| Third round | 16 | 16 | 16 | none | 30 January – 14 February |
| Quarter-finals | 8 | 8 | 8 | none | 7–28 March |
| Semi-finals | 4 | 4 | 4 | none | 4–6 April |
| Final | 2 | 2 | 2 | none | 19 April |

=== Preliminary round ===
| 13 September 2016 | Hyde United | 0–0 (a.e.t.) (4–5 p) | Glossop North End |
| | | | | Attendance: 180 |
| | Penalties |
| | Chris Amadi (penalty scored); Ayrton Bevins (penalty scored); Jake Pollard (penalty missed); Matthew Dempsey (penalty scored); Sam Fitton (penalty scored) | | (penalty scored) Jamie Rainford; (penalty scored) Ben Richardson; (penalty scored) Astley Mulholland; (penalty scored) Sam Ilesanmi; (penalty scored) Sam Hare |

| 13 September 2016 | Market Drayton Town | 3–3 (a.e.t.) (2–3 p) | Romulus |
| | Paul McMullen 6'; Glynn Coney 23'; Joshua Green 65'pen | | 37'Liam Hailey; 39'Liam Hailey; 42'Andrew Westwood |
| | Penalties |
| | Penalty scored Penalty missed | | Penalty scored Penalty missed |

| 13 September 2016 | Prescot Cables | 1–2 | Kendal Town |
| | Jack Philipa 10' (pen.) | | 54'Oliver Wood; 67'Danny Forbes | Attendance: 120 |

| Brighouse Town | W/O (Note: Match originally abandoned after 60 minutes on 12 September with Shaw Lane leading 2–0 when Shaw Lane player Daniel Wilkinson collapsed and died. Brighouse Town subsequently conceded the tie rather than require a replay.) | Shaw Lane |

=== First round ===
| 15 November 2016 | Ashton United | 2–0 | Warrington |
| 19:45 | | | | Attendance: 83 |

| 15 November 2016 | Barwell | 2–1 | Coalville Town |
| 19:45 | | | | Attendance: 109 |

| 15 November 2016 | Bedworth United | 3–4 | Matlock Town |
| 19:45 | | | | Attendance: 62 |

| 15 November 2016 | Belper Town | 1–1 (5–3 p) | Mickleover Sports |
| 19:45 | | | | Attendance: 183 |

| 15 November 2016 | Burscough | 2–1 | Lancaster City |
| 19:45 | | | | Attendance: 50 |

| 15 November 2016 | Buxton | 6–2 | Radcliffe Borough |
| 19:45 | | | | Attendance: 108 |

| 15 November 2016 | Carlton Town | 2–5 | Spalding United |
| 19:45 | | | | Attendance: 54 |

| 15 November 2016 | Droylsden | 3–5 | Trafford |
| 19:45 | | | | Attendance: 75 |

| 15 November 2016 | Frickley Athletic | 0–2 | Tadcaster Albion |
| 19:45 | | | | Attendance: 149 |

| 15 November 2016 | Glossop North End | 6–0 | Witton Albion |
| 19:45 | Karl Jones 6'; Max Leonard 40'; Max Leonard 44'; Jamie Rainford 54'; Max Leonard 62' (pen.); Jamie Rainford 75' | | | Attendance: 221 |

| 15 November 2016 | Grantham Town | 3–2 | Gresley |
| 19:45 | | | | Attendance: 91 |

| 15 November 2016 | Halesowen Town | 1–1 (2–3 p) | Rushall Olympic |
| 19:45 | | | | Attendance: 145 |

| 15 November 2016 | Kendal Town | 0–2 | Clitheroe |
| 19:45 | | | | Attendance: 81 |

| 15 November 2016 | Loughborough Dynamo | 2–4 | Basford United |
| 19:45 | | | | Attendance: 58 |

| 15 November 2016 | Mossley | 1–2 | Nantwich Town |
| 19:45 | | | | Attendance: 72 |

| 15 November 2016 | Ossett Albion | 2–4 | Farsley Celtic |
| 19:45 | | | | Attendance: 70 |

| 15 November 2016 | Ossett Town | 0–1 | Scarborough Athletic |
| 19:45 | | | | Attendance: 100 |

| 15 November 2016 | Rugby Town | 0–0 (4–3 p) | Ilkeston |
| 19:45 | | | | Attendance: 74 |

| 15 November 2016 | Shaw Lane | 2–0 | Blyth Spartans |
| 19:45 | | | | Attendance: 150 |

| 15 November 2016 | Skelmersdale United | 1–3 | Colne |
| 19:45 | | | | Attendance: 120 |

| 15 November 2016 | Stocksbridge Park Steels | 0–2 | Spennymoor Town |
| 19:45 | | | | Attendance: 74 |

| 15 November 2016 | Whitby Town | 2–3 | Goole |
| 19:45 | | | | Attendance: 165 |

| 16 November 2016 | Kidsgrove Athletic | 1–5 | Chasetown |
| 19:45 | | | | Attendance: 94 |

| 16 November 2016 | Northwich Victoria | 2–2 (5–3 p) | Colwyn Bay |
| 19:45 | | | | Attendance: 73 |

| 21 November 2016 | Romulus | 0–2 | Sheffield |
| 19:45 | | | | Attendance: 40 |

| 22 November 2016 | Lincoln United | 1–0 | Stamford |
| 19:45 | | | | Attendance: 91 |

| 22 November 2016 | Newcastle Town | 3–1 | Stafford |
| 19:45 | | | | Attendance: 111 |

| 29 November 2016 | Workington | 2–2 (4–2 p) | Ramsbottom United |
| 19:45 | | | | Attendance: 181 |

| 6 December 2016 | AFC Rushden & Diamonds | 2–1 | Corby Town |
| 19:45 | | | | Attendance: 184 |

| 6 December 2016 | Sutton Coldfield Town | 3–3 (2–4 p) | Stourbridge |
| 19:45 | | | | Attendance: 84 |

| 13 December 2016 | Bamber Bridge | 4–1 | Marine |
| 19:45 | | | | Attendance: 150 |

| 13 December 2016 | Leek Town | 1–0 | Hednesford Town |
| 19:45 | | | | Attendance: 115 |

=== Second round ===
| 7 January 2017 | Lincoln United | 2–3 | Grantham Town |
| 15:00 | | | | Attendance: 199 |

| 10 January 2017 | Barwell | 0–2 | Stourbridge |
| 19:45 | | | | Attendance: 97 |

| 10 January 2017 | Belper Town | 2–4 | Chasetown |
| 19:45 | | | | Attendance: 112 |

| 10 January 2017 | Burscough | 0–2 | Bamber Bridge |
| 19:45 | | | | Attendance: 70 |

| 10 January 2017 | Colne | 1–1 (3–4 p) | Trafford |
| 19:45 | | | | Attendance: 102 |

| 10 January 2017 | Newcastle Town | 2–1 | Sheffield |
| 19:45 | | | | Attendance: 51 |

| 10 January 2017 | Rugby Town | 1–3 | AFC Rushden & Diamonds |
| 19:45 | | | | Attendance: 147 |

| 10 January 2017 | Rushall Olympic | 0–2 | Spalding United |
| 19:45 | | | | Attendance: 71 |

| 10 January 2017 | Scarborough Athletic | 3–1 | Spennymoor Town |
| 19:45 | | | | Attendance: 141 |

| 10 January 2017 | Workington | 0–2 | Clitheroe |
| 19:45 | | | | Attendance: 172 |

| 17 January 2017 | Ashton United | 1–0 | Northwich Victoria |
| 19:45 | | | | Attendance: 85 |

| 17 January 2017 | Tadcaster Albion | 2–1 | Shaw Lane |
| 19:45 | | | | Attendance: 195 |

| 24 January 2017 | Buxton | 4–3 | Nantwich Town |
| 19:45 | | | | Attendance: 91 |

| 24 January 2017 | Matlock Town | 2–2 (8–9 p) | Basford United |
| 19:45 | | | | Attendance: 185 |

| 31 January 2017 | Farsley Celtic | 5–2 | Goole |
| 19:45 | | | | Attendance: 61 |

| 31 January 2017 | Leek Town | 2–2 (2–4 p) | Glossop North End |
| 19:45 |

=== Third round ===
| 30 January 2017 | Basford United | 4–1 | Chasetown |
| 19:45 | | | | Attendance: 116 |

| 30 January 2017 | Stourbridge | 1–4 | Grantham Town |
| 19:45 | | | | Attendance: 291 |

| 31 January 2017 | AFC Rushden & Diamonds | 0–0 (5–4 p) | Spalding United |
| 19:45 | | | | Attendance: 183 |

| 31 January 2017 | Scarborough Athletic | 2–1 | Tadcaster Albion |
| 19:45 | | | | Attendance: 214 |

| 14 February 2017 | Ashton United | 3–2 | Farsley Celtic |
| 19:45 |

| 14 February 2017 | Bamber Bridge | 1–0 | Glossop North End |
| 19:45 |

| 14 February 2017 | Clitheroe | 3–2 | Trafford |
| 19:45 |

| 21 February 2017 | Buxton | 1–0 | Newcastle Town |
| 19:45 | | | | Attendance: 92 |

=== Quarterfinals ===
| 7 March 2017 | Grantham Town | 1–1 (5–3 p) | Basford United |
| 19:45 | | | | Attendance: 164 |

| 7 March 2017 | Clitheroe | 3–2 | Scarborough Athletic |
| 19:45 | | | | Attendance: 201 |

| 14 March 2017 | AFC Rushden & Diamonds | 2–3 | Buxton |
| 19:45 | | | | Attendance: 247 |

| 28 March 2017 | Bamber Bridge | 2–1 | Ashton United |
| 19:45 | | | | Attendance: 188 |

=== Semifinals ===
| 4 April 2017 | Grantham Town | 2–1 | Clitheroe |
| 19:45 | | | | Attendance: 234 |

| 6 April 2017 | Bamber Bridge | 0–0 (4–2 p) | Buxton |
| 19:45 | | | | Attendance: 291 |

=== Final ===
| 19 April 2017 | Grantham Town | 1–2 | Bamber Bridge | Harrison Park, Leek |
| 19:45 | Danny Meadows 63' | NPL report | Jaime Milligan 45'; Regan Linney 57' | Attendance: 474 |

== See also ==
- Northern Premier League
- 2016–17 Isthmian League
- 2016–17 Southern League
