= 2015–16 Northern Premier League =

The 2015–16 season is the 48th season of the Northern Premier League Premier Division, and the ninth season of the Northern Premier League Division One North and South.

The league sponsor for 2015–16 was Evo-Stik.

== Premier Division ==
Northern Premier League Premier Division
- Season: 2015–16
- Champions: Darlington 1883
- Promoted: Darlington 1883; Salford City
- Relegated: Colwyn Bay; Hyde United; Ramsbottom United; Stamford

The Premier Division featured six new teams:

- Colwyn Bay, relegated from Conference North
- Darlington 1883, promoted via play-offs from NPL Division One North
- Hyde United, relegated from Conference North and changed name from Hyde
- Mickleover Sports, promoted as champions of NPL Division One South
- Salford City, promoted as champions of NPL Division One North
- Sutton Coldfield Town, promoted via play-offs from NPL Division One South

=== League table ===
Pos	Team	Pld	W	D	L	GF	GA	GD	Pts	Qualification or relegation
1	Darlington 1883 (C, P)	46	33	5	8	106	42	+64	104	Promotion to National League North
2	Blyth Spartans	46	32	3	11	89	41	+48	99	Qualification for play-offs
3	Salford City (O, P)	46	27	9	10	94	48	+46	90	Qualification for play-offs
4	Ashton United	46	26	9	11	90	52	+38	87	Qualification for play-offs
5	Workington	46	25	11	10	78	50	+28	86	Qualification for play-offs
6	Stourbridge	46	25	9	12	90	63	+27	84	
7	Frickley Athletic	46	22	11	13	69	46	+23	77	
8	Nantwich Town	46	20	15	11	94	62	+32	75	
9	Barwell	46	23	4	19	82	66	+16	73	
10	Rushall Olympic	46	19	12	15	74	61	+13	69	
11	Buxton	46	21	4	21	71	74	−3	67	
12	Sutton Coldfield Town	46	17	11	18	59	66	−7	62	
13	Halesowen Town	46	17	11	18	53	63	−10	62	
14	Ilkeston	46	15	9	22	61	79	−18	54	
15	Marine	46	12	17	17	53	61	−8	53	
16	Skelmersdale United	46	14	11	21	66	82	−16	53	
17	Matlock Town	46	14	10	22	59	79	−20	52	
18	Grantham Town	46	13	12	21	51	85	−34	51	
19	Whitby Town	46	12	11	23	60	79	−19	47	
20	Mickleover Sports	46	11	13	22	50	74	−24	46	
21	Stamford (R)	46	12	9	25	71	97	−26	45	Relegated to NPL Division One South
22	Hyde United (R)	46	11	7	28	53	90	−37	40	Relegated to NPL Division One North
23	Colwyn Bay (R)	46	10	8	28	51	95	−44	38	Relegated to NPL Division One North
24	Ramsbottom United (R)	46	5	11	30	43	112	−69	26	Relegated to NPL Division One North

Updated to match(es) played on 23 April 2016. Source:
Rules for classification: 1) points; 2) goal difference; 3) number of goals scored.
(C) Champions; (O) Play-off winners; (P) Promoted; (R) Relegated

=== Play-offs ===
Semi-finals
2	Blyth Spartans	3
5	Workington	4
3	Salford City (a.e.t.)	3
4	Ashton United	1

Final
3	Salford City	3
5	Workington	2

==== Semi-finals ====
26 April 2016	Blyth Spartans	3–4	Workington	Croft Park, Blyth
19:45	Sean Reid 45'; Dillon Morse 74'; Daniel Maguire 85'	Report 1Report 2	Scott Allison 34', 56', 68'; Robert Wilson 90'	Attendance: 1,124

26 April 2016	Salford City	3–1 (a.e.t.)	Ashton United	Moor Lane, Salford
19:45	J Hulme 25'; G Seddon 93'; J Poole 113'	Report	Will Haining 69'	Attendance: 866

==== Final ====
30 April 2016	Salford City	3–2	Workington	Moor Lane, Salford
15:00	S O'Halloran (14'), B Priestley (79'), J Hulme (87')	Report		Attendance: 1,967

=== Results ===
Home \ Away	ASH	BAR	BLY	BUX	COL	DAR	FRK	GRN	HAL	HYD	ILK	MAR	MAT	MIC	NAN	RAM	RSO	SLC	SKU	STM	STB	SUT	WTB	WRK
Ashton United		2–0	0–2	3–1	1–2	1–2	2–0	2–0	3–0	3–0	2–1	3–2	4–4	0–0	4–2	6–0	2–3	0–3	5–0	1–0	2–3	3–0	2–0	0–1
Barwell	0–1		0–1	1–0	3–0	2–1	1–0	3–1	6–0	2–0	4–0	1–1	4–0	2–4	0–4	2–1	2–3	0–1	3–1	0–1	3–1	2–0	2–1	0–1
Blyth Spartans	1–1	4–0		1–0	3–0	0–1	2–3	1–0	0–1	3–0	1–0	1–2	1–0	4–0	1–1	5–0	3–0	2–1	1–2	4–3	4–3	1–2	3–2	3–0
Buxton	2–1	5–1	0–4		2–0	2–0	0–2	3–0	1–1	2–1	3–1	2–3	3–0	4–1	3–1	2–1	1–2	0–2	2–1	3–1	2–3	2–2	3–2	0–2
Colwyn Bay	0–2	0–4	1–3	3–2		2–4	0–2	0–1	1–1	2–0	0–2	0–3	1–4	1–2	1–1	4–1	1–2	2–3	1–4	2–1	0–2	3–0	1–4	0–2
Darlington 1883	1–1	3–1	2–1	3–1	3–0		3–0	2–0	2–1	2–3	3–1	0–1	3–0	2–1	2–1	2–1	1–0	3–2	3–0	2–1	1–1	2–0	2–2	4–0
Frickley Athletic	0–0	1–0	2–3	5–1	1–0	3–1		3–1	1–2	3–0	3–1	0–1	1–2	2–0	1–0	3–0	0–2	0–1	3–0	3–1	2–1	3–1	2–2	1–1
Grantham Town	3–3	0–5	2–3	0–3	0–0	0–2	1–0		2–0	2–0	1–2	0–0	2–1	2–0	0–3	0–4	2–2	2–0	2–2	3–1	2–2	2–1	1–0	0–1
Halesowen Town	1–2	1–1	0–1	1–1	1–0	0–3	1–1	3–0		1–1	2–0	1–0	3–2	1–1	1–1	2–1	1–3	0–1	2–1	1–3	2–0	2–2	0–0	2–0
Hyde United	0–4	1–0	0–4	2–1	3–2	1–3	1–1	2–2	0–1		1–3	0–2	2–2	0–1	0–4	5–0	2–2	1–2	1–1	7–1	0–2	1–2	2–1	0–4
Ilkeston	1–1	1–0	3–4	3–1	0–0	1–1	0–2	2–1	1–3	3–1		0–0	0–1	0–2	3–1	3–0	4–1	2–1	1–3	0–3	4–3	1–1	2–1	0–3
Marine	0–0	1–2	0–2	1–2	2–2	0–1	1–1	1–1	0–3	2–3	3–1		2–1	3–3	1–2	3–0	1–1	0–2	2–2	1–1	1–3	2–1	2–1	1–2
Matlock Town	1–0	1–3	0–2	1–2	1–1	0–5	3–0	3–1	0–3	2–1	1–0	0–0		2–0	1–1	2–0	1–0	1–2	1–2	0–1	1–1	2–2	1–0	0–1
Mickleover Sports	1–3	1–3	0–2	2–0	1–2	1–5	0–1	2–3	2–0	1–0	1–1	1–1	2–0		1–1	3–1	1–1	1–2	2–1	0–1	1–3	0–1	1–0	1–2
Nantwich Town	2–2	2–1	1–2	1–2	3–2	0–5	1–0	6–2	3–0	3–0	1–1	1–1	2–2	1–1		7–1	3–3	1–1	1–0	6–3	1–0	4–1	1–2	2–0
Ramsbottom United	0–2	1–3	0–0	0–1	2–2	0–3	0–2	2–2	0–2	1–4	4–0	1–1	0–3	1–1	1–4		2–1	0–4	0–3	1–1	1–2	0–1	4–1	1–1
Rushall Olympic	0–2	2–0	0–1	0–1	2–1	1–0	0–1	4–0	0–0	2–0	2–2	3–0	2–3	1–1	1–0	2–0		2–3	0–0	5–1	1–2	0–1	3–1	1–1
Salford City	3–1	7–0	0–1	2–0	2–2	3–4	2–2	5–0	3–1	0–1	2–0	0–0	2–2	1–1	1–1	4–0	1–3		4–0	1–0	0–1	2–0	0–0	5–3
Skelmersdale United	1–2	3–3	2–1	2–1	3–4	1–1	1–1	0–1	1–0	2–1	2–1	2–3	3–2	1–1	0–1	1–1	4–1	3–1		1–4	1–2	1–2	0–0	2–0
Stamford	3–4	1–2	0–1	2–4	2–3	1–4	1–0	1–3	1–2	2–1	1–1	0–0	2–0	2–0	0–4	3–3	2–3	1–1	5–2		2–2	3–3	2–2	1–2
Stourbridge	1–2	2–3	3–0	3–0	2–0	1–0	1–1	1–1	3–2	5–1	1–2	2–0	4–1	2–1	4–3	2–3	2–2	1–2	3–1	2–0		2–0	2–0	0–0
Sutton Coldfield Town	0–1	1–5	1–0	0–0	5–0	0–1	2–2	2–0	3–0	0–0	0–2	4–2	2–2	2–0	0–1	2–2	2–1	0–2	3–1	2–0	2–3		1–0	0–2
Whitby Town	0–2	2–1	0–2	1–0	2–0	1–7	1–1	1–1	2–1	0–3	4–2	1–0	2–1	4–1	3–3	1–1	1–3	2–3	1–1	3–5	4–0	0–1		1–0
Workington	5–2	1–1	2–0	5–0	1–2	2–1	1–3	1–1	3–0	2–0	3–2	1–0	4–1	2–2	1–1	4–0	1–1	1–4	2–1	2–0	1–1	1–1	3–1	

Updated to match(es) played on 23 April 2016. Source: NPL Premier Division results grid
Legend: Blue = home team win; Yellow = draw; Red = away team win.

=== Stadia and locations ===
Locations of the 2015–16 Northern Premier League Premier Division teams

Team	Stadium	Capacity
Grantham Town	South Kesteven Sports Stadium	7,500
Buxton	The Silverlands	5,200
Halesowen Town	The Grove	5,000
Ashton United	Hurst Cross	4,500
Blyth Spartans	Croft Park	4,435
Hyde United	Ewen Fields	4,250
Ilkeston	New Manor Ground	3,500
Nantwich Town	The Weaver Stadium	3,500
Whitby Town	Turnbull Ground	3,500
Marine	Marine Travel Arena	3,185
Workington	Borough Park	3,101
Barwell	Kirkby Road	2,500
Skelmersdale United	West Lancashire College Stadium	2,500
Colwyn Bay	Llanelian Road	2,500
Matlock Town	Causeway Lane	2,214
Frickley Athletic	Westfield Lane	2,087
Stourbridge	War Memorial Athletic Ground	2,014
Darlington 1883	Heritage Park (groundshare)	2,004
Ramsbottom United	The Harry Williams Riverside	2,000
Stamford	Zeeco Stadium	2,000
Sutton Coldfield Town	Central Ground	2,000
Mickleover Sports	The Raygar Stadium	1,500
Rushall Olympic	Dales Lane	1,400
Salford City	Moor Lane	1,400

== Division One North ==
Northern Premier League Division One North
- Season: 2015–16
- Champions: Warrington Town
- Promoted: Warrington Town; Spennymoor Town
- Relegated: New Mills; Harrogate Railway Athletic

Division One North featured three new teams:

- Glossop North End, promoted as champions from the North West Counties League Premier Division
- Trafford, relegated from the NPL Premier Division
- Witton Albion, relegated from the NPL Premier Division

=== League table ===
Pos	Team	Pld	W	D	L	GF	GA	GD	Pts	Qualification or relegation
1	Warrington Town (C, P)	42	34	4	4	121	36	+85	106	Promotion to NPL Premier Division
2	Spennymoor Town (O, P)	42	27	10	5	113	35	+78	91	Qualification for Play-offs
3	Northwich Victoria	42	29	5	8	102	41	+61	83 (Note: Northwich Victoria were deducted 9 points for fielding an ineligible player in four matches, three of which they had won.)	Qualification for Play-offs and transferred to NPL Division One South
4	Glossop North End	42	24	9	9	78	41	+37	81	Qualification for Play-offs
5	Burscough	42	25	5	12	81	50	+31	80	Qualification for Play-offs
6	Lancaster City	42	18	15	9	74	57	+17	69	
7	Clitheroe	42	22	3	17	90	86	+4	69	
8	Trafford	42	19	8	15	78	51	+27	65	
9	Farsley Celtic	42	18	9	15	82	50	+32	63	
10	Ossett Albion	42	20	3	19	56	63	−7	63	
11	Witton Albion	42	18	7	17	85	72	+13	61	Transferred to NPL Division One South
12	Bamber Bridge	42	16	12	14	73	55	+18	60	
13	Mossley	42	18	6	18	80	76	+4	60	
14	Brighouse Town	42	17	8	17	75	72	+3	59	
15	Kendal Town	42	14	10	18	62	80	−18	52	
16	Prescot Cables	42	13	7	22	66	99	−33	46	
17	Ossett Town	42	12	7	23	51	94	−43	43	
18	Radcliffe Borough	42	11	7	24	54	75	−21	40	
19	Droylsden	42	11	6	25	68	139	−71	39	
20	Scarborough Athletic	42	10	8	24	40	64	−24	38	
21	Harrogate Railway Athletic (R)	42	6	8	28	52	115	−63	26	Relegation to NCEFL Premier Division
22	New Mills (R)	42	0	3	39	26	156	−130	3	Relegation to NWCFL Premier Division

Updated to match(es) played on 23 April 2016. Source:
Rules for classification: 1) points; 2) goal difference; 3) number of goals scored.
(C) Champions; (O) Play-off winners; (P) Promoted; (R) Relegated

=== Play-offs ===
Semi-finals
2	Spennymoor Town	3
5	Burscough	1
3	Northwich Victoria	2
4	Glossop North End	1

Final
2	Spennymoor Town	2
3	Northwich Victoria	0

==== Semi-finals ====
26 April 2016	Spennymoor Town	3–1	Burscough	The Brewery Field, Spennymoor
19:45	Craig Gott 45'; Liam Henderson 48'; Gavin Cogdon 74'		Liam Caddick 2'	Attendance: 662

27 April 2016	Northwich Victoria	2–1	Glossop North End	Wincham Park, Northwich
19:45	Stuart Cook 3'(p); Richard Bennett 61'		Mark Reed 12'	Attendance: 376

==== Final ====
30 April 2016	Spennymoor Town	2–0	Northwich Victoria	The Brewery Field, Spennymoor
15:00	Gavin Cogdon 10'; Mark Anderson 66'			Attendance: 1129

=== Results ===
Home \ Away	BAM	BRT	BUR	CLT	DRO	FAR	GNE	HRA	KEN	LNC	MOS	NEM	NOR	OSA	OST	PRC	RAD	SCA	SPE	TRA	WAR	WTN
Bamber Bridge		3–0	3–5	0–1	5–1	1–1	2–3	5–0	1–1	2–2	4–1	3–0	1–0	2–0	0–1	1–1	1–3	0–0	2–2	1–0	2–2	1–4
Brighouse Town	0–1		1–0	3–4	8–0	2–1	0–0	3–1	4–2	2–2	3–1	6–1	1–2	1–3	1–2	5–3	1–0	2–1	0–4	1–1	0–2	1–5
Burscough	1–0	2–1		6–1	3–1	0–0	0–3	3–2	2–0	1–2	3–2	2–0	1–1	2–0	1–2	0–1	1–0	3–0	0–2	4–1	4–1	2–3
Clitheroe	1–4	3–4	0–2		6–1	2–5	3–0	3–0	0–0	4–2	2–0	5–1	2–0	1–3	1–2	3–1	2–1	4–2	0–1	2–4	2–5	2–0
Droylsden	4–0	4–3	2–4	1–5		0–4	2–1	2–3	3–4	1–1	1–1	4–1	1–6	1–2	1–3	4–3	3–3	4–2	1–3	1–3	0–9	1–4
Farsley Celtic	2–1	0–1	0–3	2–0	6–0		1–3	3–1	0–3	0–0	1–2	4–0	1–2	1–0	3–0	3–0	2–1	3–1	1–1	2–0	0–1	7–0
Glossop North End	2–2	2–0	0–1	4–1	6–0	2–1		5–1	2–0	3–1	5–1	2–0	0–2	2–3	2–1	2–1	2–1	0–0	1–1	2–1	0–1	1–0
Harrogate Railway Athletic	1–2	1–1	1–2	1–3	1–1	1–1	2–4		1–3	1–3	2–0	4–1	0–1	1–3	1–2	2–1	4–1	0–6	0–4	0–5	0–7	2–2
Kendal Town	1–2	1–3	2–1	1–3	0–1	1–1	0–3	3–1		2–2	3–1	3–0	0–5	1–3	2–0	5–5	3–2	1–0	0–0	0–2	0–3	1–1
Lancaster City	1–1	2–1	1–0	1–2	1–1	2–2	1–1	1–0	3–1		0–3	2–0	2–2	6–1	3–2	5–0	4–1	1–1	0–3	0–1	2–1	3–2
Mossley	2–1	1–2	2–3	3–0	5–1	3–3	1–0	5–3	3–2	2–0		3–0	2–3	0–0	2–1	0–1	4–1	1–0	1–3	0–0	2–3	4–0
New Mills	0–7	1–1	1–2	2–3	1–4	1–4	0–3	0–3	0–2	1–3	2–7		1–5	1–4	0–2	1–7	0–5	0–3	0–9	0–4	0–5	3–3
Northwich Victoria	2–0	1–0	4–0	0–0	8–2	0–5	0–1	1–1	3–0	2–1	5–1	2–0		2–0	5–0	5–2	4–0	0–1	3–0	1–2	3–2	2–1
Ossett Albion	0–1	1–2	1–1	6–1	1–0	1–0	0–0	2–1	1–3	1–3	4–3	2–0	0–3		1–0	0–1	0–2	1–0	0–4	2–1	0–3	4–0
Ossett Town	1–1	1–1	2–2	1–5	2–3	2–5	1–3	2–1	1–1	2–2	2–2	2–0	0–4	2–3		1–1	1–2	2–0	1–5	1–0	0–4	0–5
Prescot Cables	1–1	2–1	0–3	1–1	3–2	2–0	0–4	4–2	2–2	2–3	0–2	5–2	0–2	4–0	1–3		0–1	1–1	0–1	4–1	0–3	0–6
Radcliffe Borough	1–1	2–2	2–2	1–6	1–3	3–1	0–1	0–0	0–1	1–1	0–2	4–0	1–2	1–0	4–0	3–0		2–1	1–4	0–3	1–3	2–2
Scarborough Athletic	0–3	0–1	0–3	1–3	2–4	1–0	0–0	2–2	2–1	0–1	0–2	2–1	0–3	1–2	2–1	0–3	1–0		1–1	1–0	0–1	2–3
Spennymoor Town	1–0	1–3	3–1	5–0	5–0	0–4	2–2	1–1	6–1	1–1	4–1	9–0	2–0	3–0	5–0	3–0	1–0	2–2		2–2	2–3	3–0
Trafford	3–1	2–2	1–0	2–0	1–1	3–0	1–1	6–0	2–2	2–1	2–1	3–2	2–2	0–1	4–0	8–0	2–0	0–1	0–2		1–2	1–2
Warrington Town	1–0	2–0	1–3	5–0	5–1	1–1	3–0	6–3	3–0	1–1	5–0	1–0	4–2	1–0	2–1	6–1	2–0	1–0	1–0	4–1		4–2
Witton Albion	2–4	4–1	0–2	2–3	4–0	2–1	3–0	5–0	2–3	0–1	1–1	2–2	1–2	1–0	3–1	1–2	2–0	1–0	1–2	2–0	1–1	

Updated to match(es) played on 23 April 2016. Source: NPL First Division North results grid
Legend: Blue = home team win; Yellow = draw; Red = away team win.

=== Stadia and locations ===
Locations of the 2015–16 Northern Premier League Division One North teams

Team	Stadium	Capacity
Northwich Victoria	Wincham Park (Ground share with Witton Albion)	4,813
Witton Albion	Wincham Park	4,813
Mossley	Seel Park	4,000
Spennymoor Town	The Brewery Field	2,900
Farsley Celtic	Throstle Nest	3,900
Harrogate Railway Athletic	Station View	3,500
Lancaster City	Giant Axe	3,500
Radcliffe Borough	Stainton Park	3,500
Warrington Town	Cantilever Park	3,500
Prescot Cables	Valerie Park	3,200
Burscough	Victoria Park	3,054
Droylsden	Butcher's Arms Ground	3,000
Ossett Albion	Our Physio Stadium	3,000
Scarborough Athletic	Queensgate	3,000
Trafford	Shawe View	2,500
Kendal Town	Lakeland Radio Stadium	2,400
Bamber Bridge	QED Stadium	2,264
Clitheroe	Shawbridge	2,000
Ossett Town	4G Voice & Data Stadium	2,000
New Mills	Church Lane	1,400
Glossop North End	The Arthur Goldthorpe Stadium	1,350
Brighouse Town	St Giles' Road	1,000

== Division One South ==
Northern Premier League Division One South
- Season: 2015–16
- Champions: Stafford Rangers
- Promoted: Stafford Rangers; Coalville Town
- Relegated: Tividale
- Matches: 462
- Goals: 1,456 (3.15 per match)

Division One South will feature five new teams:

- Basford United, promoted as champions from the Midland League Premier Division
- Belper Town, relegated from the NPL Premier Division
- Daventry Town, transferred from the Southern League Division One Central
- Rugby Town, transferred from the Southern League Division One Central
- Shaw Lane Aquaforce, promoted as champions from the Northern Counties East League Premier Division

=== League table ===
Pos	Team	Pld	W	D	L	GF	GA	GD	Pts	Qualification or relegation
1	Stafford Rangers (C, P)	42	29	8	5	79	31	+48	95	Promotion to NPL Premier Division
2	Shaw Lane Aquaforce	42	28	10	4	95	40	+55	94	Qualification for play-offs. Changed name to Shaw Lane.
3	Coalville Town (O, P)	42	25	10	7	81	46	+35	85	Qualification for play-offs
4	Basford United	42	22	10	10	67	42	+25	76	Qualification for play-offs
5	Lincoln United	42	21	11	10	70	46	+24	74	Qualification for play-offs
6	Stocksbridge Park Steels	42	20	9	13	72	53	+19	69	
7	Chasetown	42	19	11	12	68	49	+19	68	
8	Leek Town	42	18	9	15	61	56	+5	63	
9	Rugby Town	42	17	9	16	73	68	+5	60	
10	Romulus	42	18	6	18	76	74	+2	60	
11	Market Drayton Town	42	16	10	16	65	65	0	58	
12	Spalding United	42	14	14	14	52	54	−2	56	
13	Belper Town	42	15	9	18	66	65	+1	54	
14	Newcastle Town	42	15	8	19	65	68	−3	53	
15	Kidsgrove Athletic	42	12	14	16	81	78	+3	50	
16	Gresley	42	16	2	24	58	75	−17	50	
17	Sheffield	42	13	8	21	61	71	−10	47	
18	Carlton Town	42	14	5	23	60	72	−12	47	
19	Goole	42	10	8	24	51	87	−36	38	Transferred to the NPL Division One North
20	Loughborough Dynamo	42	10	5	27	60	108	−48	35	
21	Daventry Town	42	10	3	29	43	113	−70	33	Resigned to the UCL Division One
22	Tividale (R)	42	5	11	26	52	95	−43	26	Relegation to MFL Premier Division

Rules for classification: 1) points; 2) goal difference; 3) number of goals scored.
(C) Champions; (O) Play-off winners; (P) Promoted; (R) Relegated

=== Play-offs ===
Semi-finals
2	Shaw Lane Aquaforce	3
5	Lincoln United	2
3	Coalville Town	5
4	Basford United	0

Final
2	Shaw Lane Aquaforce	1
3	Coalville Town	3

==== Semi-finals ====
26 April 2016	Coalville Town	5–0	Basford United	Owen Street Sports Ground, Coalville
19:45	Alexander Troke 3'; Callum Woodward 22'; Danny Jenno 24'; Alexander Troke 53' (p); Nathan Watson 69'

27 April 2016	Shaw Lane Aquaforce	3–2	Lincoln United	Shaw Lane, Barnsley
19:45				Attendance: 374

==== Final ====
30 April 2016	Shaw Lane Aquaforce	1–3	Coalville Town	Shaw Lane, Barnsley
19:45		Report		Attendance: 407

=== Results ===
Home \ Away	BAS	BLP	CAR	CHA	COA	DAV	GOO	GRE	KID	LEE	LIN	LOU	MAR	NEW	ROM	RUG	SAQ	SHE	SPA	STA	STO	TIV
Basford United		3–0	1–2	2–0	0–1	3–1	1–0	2–0	1–0	2–1	0–1	3–2	2–2	1–1	0–1	3–0	1–1	1–2	2–2	1–1	1–2	4–2
Belper Town	0–2		1–3	0–0	1–0	2–0	2–3	5–2	1–1	2–0	0–0	1–2	2–0	3–3	2–0	0–2	0–2	0–3	1–1	0–1	2–1	3–0
Carlton Town	0–1	1–2		2–3	1–1	5–2	0–0	0–1	1–4	1–3	2–3	1–0	3–2	1–3	0–2	1–3	0–3	2–0	0–0	0–2	3–2	5–2
Chasetown	0–1	1–3	2–0		1–3	2–1	1–1	2–1	1–1	2–2	2–2	9–1	0–1	3–0	1–1	3–1	1–2	1–3	3–1	1–0	0–1	2–1
Coalville Town	0–1	3–2	2–1	1–1		5–0	6–2	1–0	0–0	1–1	0–1	3–0	0–0	1–0	3–2	5–4	3–2	3–2	2–1	1–1	2–1	3–1
Daventry Town	0–2	0–6	1–0	1–0	1–4		2–3	0–7	0–5	0–4	0–5	1–0	1–3	1–3	3–0	0–4	0–1	1–4	0–1	1–2	1–3	1–1
Goole	2–1	3–3	0–1	0–1	0–0	2–0		0–2	3–3	0–0	0–1	2–1	0–4	0–5	2–3	3–4	0–3	3–2	0–1	0–1	1–2	2–2
Gresley	0–1	2–1	0–2	2–1	1–3	1–4	2–1		2–0	0–1	2–1	3–3	2–3	0–2	1–4	1–3	0–3	0–0	2–0	0–1	0–3	2–1
Kidsgrove Athletic	1–4	2–2	3–3	1–2	2–5	1–2	1–2	3–1		1–1	2–2	0–2	1–1	2–1	4–2	1–1	3–5	3–0	2–0	0–3	2–2	4–0
Leek Town	2–2	1–0	1–0	0–1	4–1	5–1	3–5	3–0	3–3		1–2	3–1	0–0	1–4	1–1	1–0	0–1	1–0	0–3	2–0	2–1	3–1
Lincoln United	1–0	2–2	1–1	0–0	0–1	2–2	2–1	1–3	4–0	1–2		3–1	0–0	4–0	0–2	3–1	3–2	2–1	1–0	0–1	0–0	4–0
Loughborough Dynamo	0–1	2–5	3–2	2–3	1–4	2–0	2–0	0–3	2–6	4–0	2–1		0–1	0–3	0–3	6–1	1–2	1–0	2–2	0–2	1–5	3–3
Market Drayton Town	1–4	1–0	1–2	0–3	2–2	4–0	2–1	3–0	0–3	1–2	4–3	2–3		4–1	2–0	2–1	0–3	1–0	1–1	2–3	4–1	3–0
Newcastle Town	1–1	0–2	2–1	1–2	2–1	2–3	3–2	2–0	2–0	2–1	1–3	0–0	1–1		2–3	2–2	3–2	2–3	0–1	0–0	2–0	2–0
Romulus	0–4	2–3	1–3	1–2	0–2	4–0	5–0	0–2	0–5	2–0	1–2	5–1	4–0	2–1		1–5	1–5	4–3	1–1	1–3	1–1	2–0
Rugby Town	1–0	0–0	2–1	2–3	2–0	3–1	2–0	2–1	3–3	1–0	1–1	4–1	3–1	2–1	0–2		1–2	2–0	1–1	0–1	1–2	1–1
Shaw Lane Aquaforce	5–0	1–0	1–0	1–1	0–0	3–3	3–3	4–2	2–2	3–1	0–2	4–1	3–0	0–0	3–0	3–2		1–1	5–0	2–0	1–0	3–2
Sheffield	1–2	1–3	1–2	0–4	1–3	0–1	2–1	3–1	4–0	0–2	3–1	2–2	3–1	2–1	0–4	1–1	1–1		2–2	0–2	2–3	3–3
Spalding United	2–3	2–1	5–3	1–1	1–0	1–2	4–0	0–3	2–1	1–1	0–0	2–0	1–0	5–0	1–0	1–1	0–3	0–0		1–2	0–2	2–1
Stafford Rangers	0–0	6–0	3–0	2–1	2–2	4–1	3–0	3–1	0–3	1–0	4–1	5–2	0–0	2–1	2–2	4–0	0–1	3–2	2–0		1–1	3–0
Stocksbridge Park Steels	2–2	2–1	2–1	2–0	0–1	3–2	1–2	2–3	3–1	3–0	0–1	5–0	3–2	1–0	4–4	1–0	1–1	0–1	2–1	1–2		1–1
Tividale	1–1	4–2	0–3	1–1	1–2	1–2	0–1	0–2	3–1	1–2	1–3	3–2	3–3	5–3	0–2	4–3	1–2	0–2	1–1	0–1	0–0	

Updated to match(es) played on 23 April 2016. Source: NPL First Division South results grid
Legend: Blue = home team win; Yellow = draw; Red = away team win.

=== Stadia and locations ===
Locations of the 2015–16 Northern Premier League Division One South teams

Team	Stadium	Capacity
Rugby Town	Butlin Road	6,000
Newcastle Town	Lyme Valley Stadium	4,000
Stafford Rangers	Marston Road	4,000
Leek Town	Harrison Park	3,600
Spalding United	Sir Halley Stewart Field	3,500
Stocksbridge Park Steels	Look Local Stadium	3,500
Daventry Town	Communications Park	3,000
Goole	Victoria Pleasure Grounds	3,000
Tividale	The Beaches	3,000
Gresley	The Moat Ground	2,400
Belper Town	Christchurch Meadow	2,400
Lincoln United	Ashby Avenue	2,200
Shaw Lane Aquaforce	Shaw Lane	2,000
Chasetown	The Scholars Ground	2,000
Coalville Town	Owen Street Sports Ground	2,000
Kidsgrove Athletic	The Seddon Stadium	2,000
Romulus	The Central Ground (Sutton Coldfield Town ground share)	2,000
Sheffield	Coach and Horses Ground	2,000
Carlton Town	Bill Stokeld Stadium	1,500
Loughborough Dynamo	Nanpantan Sports Ground	1,500
Market Drayton Town	Greenfields Sports Ground	1,000
Basford United	Greenwich Avenue	1,000

== Challenge Cup ==
2015–16 Northern Premier League Challenge Cup
Challenge Cup

Tournament details
- Country: England
- Teams: 68

Final positions
- Champions: Marine
- Runners-up: Scarborough Athletic

The 2015–16 Northern Premier League Challenge Cup, known as the 15–16 Integro Doodson League Cup for sponsorship reasons, is the 46th season of the Northern Premier League Challenge Cup, the main cup competition in the Northern Premier League. It was sponsored by Doodson Sport for a fifth consecutive season. 68 clubs from England entered the competition, beginning with the preliminary round. All ties would end after 90 minutes and conclude with penalties. Due to weather damage to pitches in late December, two ties were reversed.

The defending champions were Warrington Town, who defeated Farsley on penalties in the 2015 Final. Warrington Town were unable to defend their title as they were eliminated in the first round by Ramsbottom United.

=== Calendar ===
Round	Clubs remaining	Clubs involved	Winners from previous round	New entries this round	Scheduled playing date
Preliminary round	68	8	0	8	15 September 2015
First round	64	64	4	60	9 – 11 November 2015
Second round	32	32	32	none	30 November – 2 December 2015
Third round	16	16	16	none	
Quarter-finals	8	8	8	none	
Semi-finals	4	4	4	none	
Final	2	2	2	none	

=== Preliminary round ===
Eight teams from the Northern Premier League Division One North or Northern Premier League Division One South had to compete in the preliminary round to win a place in the competition proper. The draw for this round was made on 10 July 2015.

6 October 2015	Bamber Bridge	4–0	New Mills	The Sir Tom Finney Stadium
19:45	Booth 19', 50', 87'; Joel 47'			Attendance: 124

15 September 2015	Belper Town	3–4	Rugby Town	Christchurch Meadow
19:45	Stevenson 36', 82'; Williams 90'	Belper Town report Rugby Town report	Kolodynski 32', 59'; Powell 38', 54'	Attendance: 117

15 September 2015	Shaw Lane Aquaforce	4–1	Sheffield	Shaw Lane Sports Club
19:45	Hammond 11' (o.g.); Thornhill 32'; Morris 37', 52'	Sheffield report	Sabo 61' (o.g.)	Attendance: 112

15 September 2015	Tividale	2–2 (1–4 p)	Stafford Rangers	The Beeches
19:45	Ayettey 36'; Jackson 51'	Tividale report	Rooney 45'; Till 71'	Attendance: 62
	Penalties
	Sterling (penalty scored); Danks (penalty missed); Rabone (penalty missed)		(penalty scored) Till; (penalty scored) Kasiama; (penalty scored) Edmunds; (penalty scored) McNaught

=== First round ===
Teams that were not in the preliminary round from Northern Premier League Division One North or Northern Premier League Division One South entered at this stage as well as teams from the Northern Premier League Premier Division, along with the winners from the preliminary round. The draw for this round was made on 10 July 2015.

10 November 2015	Ashton United	0–3	Nantwich Town	Hurst Cross
19:45			Shotton 4', 39'; Osborne 63'	Attendance: 101

5 January 2016	Lancaster City	0–1	Bamber Bridge	Lancaster, Lancashire
19:45			Milligan 72'	Stadium: Giant Axe; Attendance: 167

10 November 2015	Barwell	2–2 (5–4 p)	Loughborough Dynamo	Kirkby Road Sports Ground
19:45	Lower 2'; Towers 82'	Barwell report Loughborough Dynamo report	Browne 24'; Sibson 86'	Attendance: 77
	Penalties
	Gaunt (penalty scored); Towers (penalty scored); Christie (penalty scored); Hickey (penalty scored); Tomkinson (penalty scored)		(penalty scored) (penalty scored) (penalty scored); (penalty missed) Meer (penalty scored)

10 November 2015	Blyth Spartans	1–2	Darlington 1883	Croft Park
19:45	Cartwright 78'		Kneeshaw 34'; Jordon 65'	Attendance: 627

10 November 2015	Buxton	2–0	Gresley	The Silverlands
19:45	Barraclough 44'; Swain 90'			Attendance: 113

11 November 2015	Carlton Town	2–1	Basford United	Nottingham, Nottinghamshire
19:45	Graham 15'; Lusamba 66'		Wiggins-Thomas 72'	Stadium: Bill Stokeld Stadium; Attendance: 111

17 November 2015	Clitheroe	6–0	Prescot Cables	Shawbridge
19:45	Hampson 6'; Mayers 11'; Heywood 17'; Gonzales 51'; Hession 90'; Harries 90'			Attendance: 142

10 November 2015	Coalville Town	0–1	Stamford	Owen Street Sports Ground
19:45			Phillips 66'	Attendance: 83

10 November 2015	Daventry Town	3–2	Newcastle Town	Communications Park
19:45	Shariff 29'; Piggon 50'; Prinzel 62'		Mills 17'; Gardner 75'	Attendance: 64

10 November 2015	Droylsden	2–3	Radcliffe Borough	Butcher's Arms Ground
19:45	Smith 67'; Hewitt 89'		Foster 17', 90'; Davies 35'	Attendance: 92

10 November 2015	Farsley Celtic	2–0	Shaw Lane Aquaforce	Farsley, West Yorkshire
19:45	Savory 26'; Howarth 36'			Stadium: Throstle Nest; Attendance: 106

10 November 2015	Goole	0–2	Ossett Town	Victoria Pleasure Grounds
19:45			Akeroyd 69', 90'	Attendance: 166

10 November 2015	Grantham Town	0–2	Frickley Athletic	South Kesteven Sports Stadium
19:45			Lucas 29'; Dockerty 57'	Attendance: 115

10 November 2015	Halesowen Town	2–1	Leek Town	Halesowen, West Midlands
19:45	Hales 2'; Bragoli 75'		Cropper 5'	Stadium: The Grove; Attendance: 132

9 November 2015	Harrogate Railway Athletic	2–3	Stocksbridge Park Steels	Station View
19:45	Stockdill 16'; Bromley 34'		Reay 68', 87'; Lumsden 78'	Attendance: 47

14 December 2015	Hyde United	1–1 (3–4 p)	Colwyn Bay	Ewen Fields
19:45	Bevins 23'	Colwyn Bay report	Holsgrove 62'	Attendance: 86
	Penalties
	(penalty scored) (penalty scored) (penalty scored); Spencer (penalty missed); Boyle (penalty missed)		(penalty scored) Marsden; (penalty scored) Matthews; (penalty scored) Tuck; (penalty scored) Denson

11 November 2015	Kidsgrove Athletic	2–1	Chasetown	The Novus Stadium
19:45	Kinsey 38'; Taylor 73'		Turton 26'	Attendance: 179

10 November 2015	Lincoln United	1–1 (5–4 p)	Mickleover Sports	Ashby Avenue
19:45	Fairclough 50'	Lincoln United report	Dawes 60'	Attendance: 78
	Penalties
	(penalty scored) (penalty scored) (penalty scored); Vince (penalty scored); Smith (penalty scored)		(penalty scored) (penalty scored); (penalty missed) O’Neil-Dwyer (penalty scored) (penalty scored)

10 November 2015	Marine	2–1	Glossop North End	Crosby, Merseyside
19:45	Codling 31'; Burton 81'		Brizell 90'	Stadium: Marine Travel Arena; Attendance: 248

10 November 2015	Market Drayton Town	1–1 (4–3 p)	Stourbridge	Greenfields Sports Ground
19:45	Ryan 73'	Market Drayton Town report Stourbridge report	Clarke 39'	Attendance: 131
	Penalties
	Ryan (penalty scored); McFarlane (penalty scored); Lowe (penalty scored); Green (penalty scored)		(penalty missed) Clifton; (penalty scored) Wright; (penalty scored) Billingham; (penalty scored) McPike; (penalty missed) Knight

10 November 2015	Ossett Albion	3–2	Mossley	Our Physio Stadium
19:45	Bower 8'; Brunt 28'; Matthews 70'		Short 43'; McGonigle 90'	Attendance: 81

1 December 2015	Ramsbottom United	2–0	Warrington Town	The Harry Williams Stadium
19:45	Smith 1', 35'			Attendance: 104

10 November 2015	Romulus	0–1	Sutton Coldfield Town	Central Ground
19:45			Melvin 5'	Attendance: 70

10 November 2015	Rugby Town	0–2	Ilkeston	Butlin Road
19:45		Rugby Town report	Burrows 25', 44'	Attendance: 142

10 November 2015	Salford City	1–2	Trafford	Moor Lane
19:45	Mwasile 67'		Tuanzebe 7'; Stott 32'	Attendance: 998

10 November 2015	Scarborough Athletic	2–2 (4–3 p)	Whitby Town	Queensgate
19:45	Blott 33', 75'	Scarborough Athletic report Whitby Town report	Roberts 60' (pen.); McTiernan 88'	Attendance: 312
	Penalties
	Mallory (penalty scored); Peterson (penalty missed); Blott (penalty scored); Bradshaw (penalty scored); Peat (penalty scored)		(penalty scored) Roberts; (penalty scored) Robinson; (penalty missed) Bullock; (penalty scored) Gardner; (penalty missed) Charmey

10 November 2015	Skelmersdale United	1–6	Northwich Victoria	The West Lancashire College Stadium
19:45	Kusaloka 70'		Cook 19'; Amis 29', 56'; Burnett 30', 57', 69'	Attendance: 123

10 November 2015	Spalding United	0–0 (3–4 p)	Matlock Town	Sir Halley Stewart Playing Field
19:45		Spalding United report Matlock Town report		Attendance: 124
	Penalties
	Moreman (penalty scored); Graham (penalty missed); Walker (penalty scored); Newman (penalty missed); Stainfield (penalty scored)		(penalty scored) Wilson; (penalty scored) Fallowfield; (penalty scored) Cribley; (penalty missed) Nelthorpe; (penalty scored) Purkiss

10 November 2015	Spennymoor Town	2–0	Brighhouse Town	The Brewery Field
19:45	Pollard 73' (o.g.); Morrow 89'			Attendance: 219

10 November 2015	Stafford Rangers	1–0	Rushall Olympic	Marston Road
19:45	White 37'	Stafford Rangers report		Attendance: 270

10 November 2015	Witton Albion	3–2	Burscough	Northwich, Cheshire
19:45	Andrews 9'; Menagh 59'; Salmon 79'		Monaghan 39'; Connolly 69'	Stadium: Wincham Park; Attendance: 101

10 November 2015	Workington	3–0	Kendal Town	Borough Park
19:45	Allison 46', 54', 69'			Attendance: 226

=== Second round ===
The 32 winners from the first round were entered into the second round draw on 12 November 2015. The ties were originally scheduled to be played between 30 November and 2 December.

2 December 2015	Carlton Town	3–2	Barwell	Nottingham, Nottinghamshire
19:45	Davie 7'; Law 19', 38'		Carney 72', 90'	Stadium: Bill Stokeld Stadium; Attendance: 66

1 December 2015	Farsley Celtic	6–0	Stocksbridge Park Steels	Farsley, West Yorkshire
19:45	Osborne 9', 39', 44'; Walker 23'; Savory 74'; Daly 75'			Stadium: Throstle Nest; Attendance: 77

1 December 2015	Frickley Athletic	2–3	Darlington 1883	South Elmsall, West Yorkshire
19:45	Thomas 8' (pen.); Davie 90'		Dowson 16', 36'; Brown 40'	Stadium: Westfield Lane; Attendance: 142

1 December 2015	Halesowen Town	0–2	Sutton Coldfield Town	Halesowen, West Midlands
19:45			McKenzie 6', 30'	Stadium: The Grove; Attendance: 143

4 January 2016	Ilkeston	5–1	Lincoln United	Ilkeston, Derbyshire
19:45	Walker 18'; Blake 20', 48', 51'; Wheatley 90'		Gibson 38'	Stadium: New Manor Ground; Attendance: 163

1 December 2015	Matlock Town	1–3	Daventry Town	Matlock, Derbyshire
19:45	Purkiss 45'		Piggon 33'; Curtis 62' (pen.); Shariff 69'	Stadium: Causeway Lane; Attendance: 145

1 December 2015	Nantwich Town	3–1	Market Drayton Town	Nantwich, Cheshire
19:45	Osborne 35' (pen.), 63' (pen.); Cooke 85'		McFarlane 32'	Stadium: The Weaver Stadium; Attendance: 191

2 February 2016	Radcliffe Borough	0–1	Colwyn Bay	Radcliffe, Greater Manchester
19:45			Lamb 15'	Stadium: Belvoir Stadium; Attendance: 49

19 January 2016	Marine	2–1	Ramsbottom United	Crosby, Merseyside
19:45	Mitchley 7'; Ellams 17'		Meaney 58'	Stadium: Marine Travel Arena; Attendance: 129

1 December 2015	Scarborough Athletic	2–0	Ossett Albion	Bridlington, East Riding of Yorkshire
19:45	Metcalfe 16'; Blott 43'			Stadium: Queensgate; Attendance: 141

19 January 2016	Spennymoor Town	0–1	Ossett Town	Spennymoor, County Durham
19:45			Brown 52'	Stadium: The Brewery Field; Attendance: 123

8 December 2015	Stafford Rangers	2–2 (3–5 p)	Kidsgrove Athletic	Stafford, Staffordshire
19:45	Adams 63'; Reid 78'	Stafford Rangers report	Malbon 29'; Sherratt 90'	Stadium: Marston Road; Attendance: 212
	Penalties
	(penalty scored) (penalty scored) (penalty scored); Adams (penalty missed)		(penalty scored) (penalty scored) (penalty scored) (penalty scored); (penalty scored) Malbon

26 January 2016	Stamford	4–1	Buxton	Stamford, Lincolnshire
19:45	Wightwick 12', 39'; Duffy 19'; Smith 36'		Wiles 17'	Stadium: Zeeco Stadium; Attendance: 105

1 December 2015	Trafford	2–0	Northwich Victoria	Flixton, Greater Manchester
19:45	Noar 64'; Gumbs 77'			Stadium: Shawe View; Attendance: 99

19 January 2016	Witton Albion	1–2	Bamber Bridge	Northwich, Cheshire
19:45	Hopley 44'		Marlow 25'; Linney 71'	Stadium: Wincham Park; Attendance: 104

19 January 2016	Workington	2–0	Clitheroe	Workington, Cumbria
19:45	Arnison 80', 88'			Stadium: Borough Park; Attendance: 268

=== Third round ===
The 16 winners from the second round were entered into the third round draw on 20 January 2016. The ties were originally scheduled to be played between 9 and 16 February.

16 February 2016	Colwyn Bay	1–1 (5–4 p)	Trafford	Old Colwyn, North Wales
19:45	Lamb 10'		Langford 90'	Stadium: Llanelian Road; Attendance: 81
	Penalties
	Denson (penalty scored); Gorman (penalty scored); Harper (penalty scored); Bauress (penalty scored); Kelleher (penalty scored)		(penalty scored) Palmer; (penalty scored) Jacobs; (penalty scored) Davies; (penalty scored) Correria; (penalty missed) Langford

16 February 2016	Farsley Celtic	1–1 (4–5 p)	Scarborough Athletic	Farsley, West Yorkshire
19:45	Nightingale 62'		Corner 2'	Stadium: Throstle Nest; Attendance: 129
	Penalties
	Miller (penalty scored); O'Brien (penalty scored); Nightingale (penalty missed); Savory (penalty missed); Howarth (penalty scored); Walker (penalty scored); Daly (penalty missed)		(penalty scored) (penalty scored) (penalty scored); (penalty missed) Forrester; (penalty missed) Blott (penalty scored); (penalty scored) Lamplough

29 February 2016	Ilkeston	3–0	Daventry Town	Ilkeston, Derbyshire
19:45	Williams 29'; Udoh 60'; Atkinson 71'			Stadium: New Manor Ground; Attendance: 174

16 February 2016	Marine	3–2	Workington	Crosby, Merseyside
19:45	Myler 31'; Mitchley 73'; Codling 90'		Calvert 4'; McGee 56'	Stadium: Marine Travel Arena; Attendance: 136

1 March 2016	Nantwich Town	5–1	Bamber Bridge	Nantwich, Cheshire
19:45	Cosgrove 30'; Osborne 55' (pen.); Shotton 67', 75'; Jones 90'		Linney 59'	Stadium: The Weaver Stadium; Attendance: 203

16 February 2016	Ossett Town	3–1	Darlington 1883	Ossett, West Yorkshire
19:45	Ojo 17'; Moore 45'; Lyn 74'		Walton 90'	Stadium: 4G Voice & Data Stadium; Attendance: 119

9 February 2016	Stamford	1–3	Carlton Town	Stamford, Lincolnshire
19:45	Malone 50'		Rae 29'; Fletcher 66'; Gordon 79'	Stadium: Zeeco Stadium; Attendance: 83

9 February 2016	Sutton Coldfield Town	2–2 (2–4 p)	Kidsgrove Athletic	Sutton Coldfield, West Midlands
19:45	Nadat 40'; Mannion 40'		Morris 64'; Bergin 71'	Stadium: Central Ground; Attendance: 66
	Penalties
	Penalty missed Penalty scored		(penalty scored) Woolley; (penalty scored) Bergin; (penalty scored) Donnelly; (penalty missed) Boast; (penalty scored) Malbon

=== Quarter-finals ===
The eight winners from the third round were entered into the quarter-final draw on 17 February 2016. The ties were originally scheduled to be played between 1 and 15 March.

16 March 2016	Kidsgrove Athletic	0–2	Ilkeston	Kidsgrove, Staffordshire
19:45			Rose 16'; Udoh 61'	Stadium: The Novus Stadium; Attendance: 150

8 March 2016	Marine	1–0	Ossett Town	Crosby, Merseyside
19:45	Mitchley 79' (pen.)			Stadium: Marine Travel Arena; Attendance: 172

8 March 2016	Nantwich Town	3–4	Colwyn Bay	Nantwich, Cheshire
19:45	Bennion 20'; Cooke 32'; Gordon 64'		Kelleher 38', 57'; Denson 49'; Harper 90'	Stadium: The Weaver Stadium; Attendance: 266

1 March 2016	Scarborough Athletic	4–0	Carlton Town	Bridlington, East Riding of Yorkshire
19:45	Birch 27'; Corner 42' (pen.); Blott 64', 66'			Stadium: Queensgate; Attendance: 197

=== Semi-finals ===
The four winners from the quarter-finals were entered into the Semi-final draw on 9 March 2016. The ties were originally scheduled to be played on 22 March and 26 April.

26 April 2016	Marine	4–1	Colwyn Bay	Crosby, Merseyside
19:45	Hessey 12'; Foley 33'; Owens 42'; Burton 54'		Kelleher 80'	Stadium: Marine Travel Arena; Attendance: 260

22 March 2016	Scarborough Athletic	1–1 (5–3 p)	Ilkeston	Bridlington, East Riding of Yorkshire
19:45	Blott 53'		Jones 35'	Stadium: Queensgate; Attendance: 302
	Penalties
	Peat (penalty scored); Robson (penalty scored); Birch (penalty scored); Forrester (penalty scored); Lamplough (penalty scored)		(penalty scored) Shaw; (penalty scored) Baker; (penalty scored) Williams; (penalty missed) Gordon

=== Final ===
The Challenge Cup Final was played at Throstle Nest, the home ground of Farsley Celtic. This was Scarborough Athletic's first final appearance (Scarborough won in 1977) and the sixth final appearance for Marine (their most recent appearance was in 2003 where they defeated Gateshead).

29 April 2016	Scarborough Athletic	1–2	Marine	Throstle Nest, Farsley
20:00 BST	C. Robinson 66'		Bellew 66'; Mitchley 90'	Attendance: 690

== See also ==
- 2015–16 Isthmian League
- 2015–16 Southern League
