= Brendon Phillips =

Jamaican footballer and manager (born 1954)

Personal information
- Full name: Brendon Ulysses Phillips
- Date of birth: 16 July 1954 (age 72)
- Place of birth: Saint Catherine Parish, Jamaica
- Position: Midfielder

Senior career*
Years	Team	Apps	(Gls)
1972–1973	Leicester City	0	(0)
1973–1974	Peterborough United	1	(0)
1974–1976	Burton Albion		
1976–1979	Nuneaton Borough		
1979	Kettering Town		
1979	Boston United		
1980–1981	Mansfield Town	17	(0)
1980–1982	Boston United		
1982	Nuneaton Borough		
1983	Scarborough		
1984	Nuneaton Borough		
1984	Scarborough		
1985	Shepshed Charterhouse		
1985	Corby Town		
1986–1990	Aylesbury United	106	(12)
1990–1992	Atherstone United		
1992	Bedworth United		
1992	Stafford Rangers		
Total		124	(0)

Managerial career
- 1994–1997: Bedworth United
- 1997–2000: Nuneaton Borough
- 2001–2004: Halesowen Town
- 2006–2007: Coalville Town
- 2009: Halesowen Town (Caretaker)
- * Club domestic league appearances and goals

Brendon Ulysses Phillips (born 16 July 1954) is a Jamaican former professional footballer who played in the Football League for Mansfield Town and Peterborough United.

== Management career ==
=== Halesowen Town ===
Phillips managed Halesowen Town between 2001 and 2004.

Phillips managed Coalville Town between 2006 and 2007.
