= Anthony Malbon =

English footballer

Personal information
- Full name: Anthony Jordan Malbon
- Date of birth: 14 October 1991 (age 35)
- Place of birth: Stoke-on-Trent, England
- Height: 1.73 m (5 ft 8 in)
- Position: Forward

Team information
- Current team: Eccleshall

Youth career
- Derby County
- 2008–2009: Port Vale

Senior career*
| Years | Team | Apps | (Gls) |
| 2009–2010 | Port Vale | 3 | (0) |
| 2010 | → Leek Town (loan) | 3 | (2) |
| 2010 | → Newcastle Town (loan) | 3 | (2) |
| 2010–2011 | Leek Town | 25 | (10) |
| 2011–2012 | Newcastle Town | 26 | (17) |
| 2012–2014 | Kidderminster Harriers | 96 | (33) |
| 2014 | Stalybridge Celtic | 4 | (1) |
| 2014–2022 | Kidsgrove Athletic | | |
| 2022 | Hanley Town | 4 | (1) |
| 2022 | Leek Town | 0 | (0) |
| 2022 | Eccleshall | 11 | (7) |
| 2023 | Wolstanton United | 0 | (0) |
| 2023 | Kidsgrove Athletic Reserves | 6 | (4) |
| 2023–2024 | Kidsgrove Athletic | 10 | (2) |
| 2025– | Eccleshall | 0 | (0) |

Managerial career
- 2022: Stafford Town
- 2024: Kidsgrove Athletic (interim)
- * Club domestic league appearances and goals

Anthony Jordan Malbon (born 14 October 1991) is an English former professional footballer who plays as a forward for North West Counties League Division One South club Eccleshall.

Malbon played for Port Vale between 2009 and 2010 before he signed with Leek Town in the summer of 2010. He moved on to Newcastle the following year. He also played on loan for both Leek and Newcastle during his time at Vale. In January 2012, he moved up three divisions to play for Conference side Kidderminster Harriers. He was called up to the England C squad in May 2012 but did not win a cap. He was named on the Conference Team of the Year for the 2012–13 season. He switched to Stalybridge Celtic in June 2014 and then joined Kidsgrove Athletic in December 2014. He became the highest goalscorer in the club's history with 159 goals in eight years. He joined Hanley Town in March 2022. He helped the club to win the Midland League Premier Division title at the end of the 2021–22 season before moving on to Eccleshall in July 2022. He returned to Kidsgrove Athletic in July 2023, initially featuring for their reserve team before breaking into the first team and becoming interim manager in March 2024. He rejoined Eccleshall in July 2025.

== Club career ==
=== Early career ===
Malbon joined Port Vale as a youngster from Derby County in February 2008. He made his Football League debut as a substitute in a 2–1 win over Barnet on 2 May 2009. This came after picking up the club's Youth Player of the Year award the previous week. During the 2008–09 season, he scored 23 goals in the Youth league, and he was voted Youth Player of the Year by the Port Vale management. In February 2010 Malbon Joined Leek Town of the Northern Premier League Division One South for three games on a work experience deal. He scored a brace on his debut. He was offered his first (one year) professional contract at Vale Park at the end of the season.

In the 2010–11 pre-season, manager Micky Adams was pleased with Malbon's development, having witnessed the youngster score in two successive friendlies. However, Malbon purposefully avoided a pre-season trip to Ireland by failing to produce a passport as he did not want to take part in the intense running sessions Adams had planned for the squad; this led to him being dropped form the squad by Adams. The "Valiants" denied Leek the opportunity to sign the youngster permanently. In October 2010, Malbon went on loan to Newcastle Town, and impressed enough to earn an extension to the loan. In November 2010, Malbon left Port Vale by mutual consent. He immediately signed with Leek Town, rather than Newcastle Town. His scoring record at Leek attracted attention from Conference clubs. However, a trial at Stockport County was ended after manager Ray Mathias was replaced by Dietmar Hamann. Malbon subsequently signed a one-year deal with Newcastle Town.

=== Kidderminster Harriers ===
Boasting a prolific scoring record with Newcastle in 2011–12, Malbon was signed by Conference National side Kidderminster Harriers on an 18-month contract in January 2012; Kidderminster paid Newcastle Town an initial £7,000 for his services. Manager Steve Burr thanked the "Castle" for allowing the deal, and stated that "he comes across as a lad who really wants the opportunity to come and succeed here, and who is hungry to do that." He made his debut from the bench on 21 January, netting the first goal of a 2–0 win at Alfreton Town. On 28 April, he had to be airlifted from the pitch at Aggborough after he "suffered a significant blow to his head and neck and was unconscious for a couple of minutes."

He signed a new two-year contract in March 2013, having hit a streak of 11 goals in 12 games to send Harriers to the top of the table. Malbon and strike partner Michael Gash finished the 2012–13 season as the division's joint-third highest scorers with 19 goals, helping Kidderminster to secure a play-off place with a second-place finish. At the end of the season he was voted onto the Conference Team of the Year, alongside teammates Lee Vaughan and Josh Gowling. He found goals more difficult to come by in the 2013–14 season as new manager Andy Thorn switched to a one striker system, leaving Malbon to sometimes feature from the bench or in midfield.

=== Stalybridge Celtic ===
Malbon signed with Conference North club Stalybridge Celtic after having his contract with Kidderminster Harriers mutually terminated in June 2014. He struggled with depression and only made five appearances, scoring once, before he was released and joined Kidsgrove Athletic in December 2014.

=== Kidsgrove Athletic ===
Kidsgrove Athletic finished 20th in the Northern Premier League Division One South in 2014–15, 15th in 2015–16, and 12th in 2016–17. He rejected a move up a division to join Nantwich Town in February 2016. He scored 25 goals for the "Grove" in the 2016–17 season. However, he missed large parts of the 2017–18 season due to injury, whilst also began to adapt his game to become more of a target-man forward. Kidsgrove finished tenth in the 2018–19 season, with Malbon scoring 32 goals. He agreed a new two-year deal with the club in March 2020, despite the ongoing coronavirus pandemic in England. At that stage he was on 147 goals for Kidsgrove, making him the highest goalscorer in the club's history. He scored a hat-trick against Chasetown on 6 October 2020 to reach 150 club goals. However, both the 2019–20 and 2020–21 seasons were abandoned due to the pandemic. Malbon agreed a new contract with Kidsgrove in May 2021. He scored a club record total of 159 goals during his eight-year stay.

=== Later career ===
Malbon joined Hanley Town of the Midland League Premier Division in March 2022. The club won the league title at the end of the 2021–22 season, though Malbon started just one match. Malbon very briefly reunited with Leek Town once again, making just one substitute appearance during a 4–1 loss to Runcorn Linnets in the Northern Premier League Division One West play-off semi-final. In July 2022, he joined North West Counties League Division One South club Eccleshall. He scored nine goals in 14 games in the first half of the 2022–23 season. He went on to register with Wolstanton United of the Staffordshire County Senior League Premier Division.

Malbon's re-signing for Kidsgrove Athletic was confirmed during a post-match interview, whereby Kidsgrove Athletic Reserves ran out 6–1 winners over Milton United. He played several games for the reserves in the Staffordshire County Senior League. After regaining fitness, Malbon returned to the first team as a 69th-minute substitute in a 2–1 defeat to Prescot Cables on 18 October 2023. He scored his 160th goal for the club against Trafford on 25 November. The club's record scorer was amongst the goals again in December, opening the scoring against Mossley. However, he collapsed after suffering a seizure during a match against Avro in February. He rejoined Eccleshall in July 2025.

== International career ==
He was called up to the England C squad for the game against Russia on 5 June 2012. He was again called up by Paul Fairclough for the England C game against Bermuda on 10 May 2013. However, he never won a cap as he pulled out of both trips to go on 'lad's holidays' to Magaluf and Benidorm; he made an excuse to miss the Russia game and e-mailed Fairclough to inform him he was retired from international duty for the trip to Bermuda.

== Managerial career ==
Malbon spent 27 days as manager of Stafford Town in October 2022, briefly stepping away from his playing duties with Eccleshall and returning afterwards. He won his debut managerial match 3–2 at home to Alsager Town. He was assigned as Kidsgrove Athletic's interim manager after the departure of Scott Dundas in March 2024.

== Career statistics ==
Appearances and goals by club, season and competition
| Club | Season | League | | | FA Cup | | League Cup | | Other | | Total | |
| Club | Season | Division | Apps | Goals | Apps | Goals | Apps | Goals | Apps | Goals | Apps | Goals |
|---|---|---|---|---|---|---|---|---|---|---|---|---|
| Port Vale | 2008–09 | League Two | 1 | 0 | 0 | 0 | 0 | 0 | 0 | 0 | 1 | 0 |
| Port Vale | 2009–10 | League Two | 0 | 0 | 0 | 0 | 0 | 0 | 0 | 0 | 0 | 0 |
| Port Vale | 2010–11 | League Two | 2 | 0 | 0 | 0 | 0 | 0 | 0 | 0 | 2 | 0 |
| Port Vale | Total | | 3 | 0 | 0 | 0 | 0 | 0 | 0 | 0 | 3 | 0 |
| Leek Town (loan) | 2009–10 | Northern Premier League; Division One South | 3 | 2 | 0 | 0 | — | | 0 | 0 | 3 | 2 |
| Leek Town | 2010–11 | Northern Premier League; Division One South | 25 | 10 | 0 | 0 | — | | 0 | 0 | 25 | 10 |
| Leek Town | Total | | 28 | 12 | 0 | 0 | 0 | 0 | 0 | 0 | 28 | 12 |
| Newcastle Town | 2010–11 | Northern Premier League; Division One South | 3 | 2 | 0 | 0 | — | | 0 | 0 | 3 | 2 |
| Newcastle Town | 2011–12 | Northern Premier League; Division One South | 26 | 17 | 3 | 7 | — | | 6 | 6 | 35 | 30 |
| Newcastle Town | Total | | 29 | 19 | 3 | 7 | 0 | 0 | 6 | 6 | 38 | 32 |
| Kidderminster Harriers | 2011–12 | Conference National | 17 | 8 | 0 | 0 | — | | 0 | 0 | 17 | 8 |
| Kidderminster Harriers | 2012–13 | Conference Premier | 46 | 19 | 2 | 1 | — | | 2 (Note: Appearance(s) in the FA Trophy.) | 0 | 50 | 20 |
| Kidderminster Harriers | 2013–14 | Conference Premier | 33 | 6 | 4 | 1 | — | | 1 | 0 | 38 | 7 |
| Kidderminster Harriers | Total | | 96 | 33 | 6 | 2 | 0 | 0 | 1 | 0 | 103 | 35 |
| Stalybridge Celtic | 2014–15 | Conference North | 4 | 1 | 1 | 0 | — | | 0 | 0 | 5 | 1 |
| Kidsgrove Athletic (Note: Statistics for Kidsgrove Athletic not recorded for the 2014–15, 2015–16, 2016–17 and 2017–18 seasons) | 2018–19 | Northern Premier League; Division One West | 24 | 14 | 0 | 0 | — | | 4 (Note: One appearance in Integro League Cup, three appearances in Staffordshire Senior Cup.) | 4 | 28 | 18 |
| Kidsgrove Athletic | 2019–20 | Northern Premier League; Division One South East | 20 | 10 | 5 | 2 | — | | 4 (Note: Three appearances in FA Trophy, one appearance in Integro League Cup) | 0 | 29 | 12 |
| Kidsgrove Athletic | 2020–21 | Northern Premier League; Division One South East | 6 | 4 | 1 | 0 | — | | 2 (Note: Two appearances in FA Trophy) | 0 | 7 | 4 |
| Kidsgrove Athletic | 2021–22 | Northern Premier League; Division One West | 15 | 4 | 1 | 0 | — | | 4 (Note: Two appearances in FA Trophy, two appearances in Staffordshire Senior Cup) | 2 | 20 | 6 |
| Kidsgrove Athletic | Total | | 65 | 32 | 7 | 2 | — | | 14 | 6 | 84 | 40 |
| Hanley Town | 2021–22 | Midland League; Premier Division | 4 | 1 | 0 | 0 | — | | — | | 4 | 1 |
| Leek Town | 2021–22 | Northern Premier League; Division One West | 0 | 0 | 0 | 0 | — | | 1 (Note: One appearance in play-offs) | 0 | 1 | 0 |
| Eccleshall | 2022–23 | North West Counties League; Division One South | 11 | 7 | 0 | 0 | — | | 3 (Note: One appearance in Edward Case Cup, two appearances in FA Vase) | 2 | 14 | 9 |
| Wolstanton United | 2022–23 | Staffordshire County Senior League; Premier Division | 0 | 0 | — | | — | | — | | 0 | 0 |
| Kidsgrove Athletic Reserves | 2023–24 | Staffordshire County Senior League; Premier Division | 6 | 4 | — | | — | | 1 (Note: One appearance in Staffordshire Senior Challenge Vase) | 0 | 7 | 4 |
| Kidsgrove Athletic | 2023–24 | Northern Premier League; Division One West | 10 | 2 | — | | — | | 0 | 0 | 10 | 2 |
| Eccleshall | 2025–26 | North West Counties League; Division One South | 0 | 0 | 0 | 0 | — | | 0 | 0 | 0 | 0 |

== Honours ==
Individual

- Conference Premier Team of the Year: 2012–13
