= Gary Setchell =

English footballer (born 1975)

Personal information
- Date of birth: 8 May 1975 (age 51)
- Place of birth: King's Lynn, England
- Position: Defender

Team information
- Current team: Basford United (manager)

Senior career*
Years	Team	Apps	(Gls)
199?–199?	King's Lynn		
199?–199?	Wisbech Town		
199?–1999	Fakenham Town		
1999–2000	Kettering Town	30	(2)
2000–2003	Rushden & Diamonds	51	(2)
2003	Tamworth	17	(2)
2003–2005	King's Lynn	42	(2)
2005–2006	A.F.C. Sudbury		
2006–2008	Swaffham Town		
2008–2010	Wisbech Town		

Managerial career
- 2008–2010: Wisbech Town
- 2010–2017: King's Lynn Town
- 2017–2019: Wisbech Town
- 2020–2022: Bedford Town
- 2023–2025: Corby Town
- 2026–: Basford United
- * Club domestic league appearances and goals

Gary Setchell (born 8 May 1975) is an English former professional footballer and manager. Setchell is currently manager at Basford United.

== Managerial Career ==
=== Kings Lynn Town (2010-2017) ===
In July 2015 Setchell was appointed full-time General Manager of King's Lynn Town to help build links between the club and local community.

In October 2015 he reached his 300th game as manager of King's Lynn Town.

Setchell was sacked as King's Lynn Town manager on 21 February 2017, having been in charge of the club for a total of 384 matches. During almost seven years as manager he had overseen two promotions, as well as taking King's Lynn to the FA Vase Semi Finals in 2010–11 and the last 16 of the FA Trophy in 2012–13.

=== Wisbech Town (2017-2019) ===
In September 2017, Setchell was named the new manager of Wisbech Town, returning to the club after seven years. He resigned from the role in May 2019.

=== Bedford Town (2020-2022) ===
On 25 September 2020, Setchell was appointed manager of Bedford Town. However, following a 4–3 home loss to Bromsgrove Sporting in November 2022, Setchell was relieved of his duties having won just one game from the previous seven.

=== Corby Town (2023-2025) ===
Setchell was appointed manager of Corby Town on 7 January 2023, following the departure of Lee Attenborough to Belper Town. He brought long-time assistant Darren Edey with him, taking charge of a side sitting sixth in the Northern Premier League Division One Midlands.

His first competitive victory came in his fifth match, a 3–2 away win against Loughborough Dynamo on 11 February 2023. A week later, Corby produced a notable upset by beating league leaders Halesowen Town 4–2. A run of five successive wins culminated in a 1–0 victory over Spalding United on 22 March, moving the club into the play-off positions. However, a subsequent three-match winless spell proved costly, and despite winning their final three fixtures and scoring 15 goals, Corby missed the play-offs by two points.

Setchell remained in charge for the 2023–24 season and rebuilt the squad, including several players from his title-winning Bedford Town side of 2021–22. Corby opened the campaign with a 3–2 win at Boldmere, but struggled at home and did not record their first home league victory until 1 January 2024, a 3–2 win over AFC Rushden & Diamonds. By that point the team had scored 46 league goals, only 14 of which had come at home. A strong finish to the season prompted speculation that Corby might have challenged for the title had their early home form been stronger; they remained unbeaten away against the eventual top three.

Setchell continued for the 2024–25 season, during which Corby were considered among the promotion favourites. An excellent start left the club unbeaten and six points clear by the end of September. The run ended with a 2–0 home defeat to Quorn on 9 October, but Corby responded with four consecutive victories, three against fellow play-off contenders. After defeating Shepshed Dynamo 3–2 in early November, the team endured a poor spell, losing four of their next six matches. Although form later improved, Quorn pulled clear at the top of the league.

Setchell led Corby to the Northamptonshire Senior Cup final at Sixfields, losing 2–0, and secured a home play-off semi-final. Corby defeated Long Eaton United 1–0 in front of a crowd of around 1,400, advancing to face Worcester City. A season-high attendance of approximately 2,700 watched Corby lose 2–1 in the final, bringing an end to what was regarded as a strong and largely successful campaign.

On 16 December 2025, Setchell resigned due to budget cuts.

=== Harborough Town (2026) ===
Setchell was announced as Harborough Town F.C.'s director of football on 15 February 2026.

=== Basford United (2026–) ===
On 10 August 2026, Setchell left his role as director of football at Harborough Town to become manager at Northern Premier League Division One Midlands side Basford United.

== Personal life ==
In June 2005 Setchell was sentenced to two months' imprisonment by King's Lynn magistrates, after being convicted of assaulting his wife following a dispute on New Year's Eve 2004.
