= Coalville Town F.C. =

English football club

Coordinates: 52°43′23″N 1°22′54″W

Coalville Town
- Full name: Coalville Town Football Club
- Nickname: The Ravens
- Founded: 1926
- Ground: Owen Street Sports Ground, Coalville
- Capacity: 2,500
- Chairman: Paul Tubb
- Manager: Carl Adams
- League: Midland League Division One
- 2025–26: United Counties League Division One, 3rd of 23 (transferred)
- Website: coalvilletownfc.co.uk
Home colours	Away colours

Coalville Town Football Club is a semi-professional football club based in Coalville, Leicestershire, England. They are currently members of the Midland League Division One and play at the Owen Street Sports Ground. Established in 1926 as Ravenstone Miners Athletic, the club adopted its current name in 1995. In 2003 they moved up from playing in county leagues to the Midland Alliance. After reaching the final of the FA Vase in 2009–10, the following season saw them promoted to the second tier of the Northern Premier League. Following another promotion in 2016, they were transferred to the Southern League and played in its Premier Division Central until 2024, when the club resigned and dropped three tiers into the United Counties League.

== History ==
The club was established as Ravenstone Miners Athletic in 1926, and were originally based in the village of Ravenstone. They joined the Coalville & District League and were Division Two champions in 1933–34. The club were renamed Ravenstone Swifts in 1947 and then Ravenstone Miners Athletic in 1951. They won the Division One title five times, including in 1952–53. In 1958 the club were renamed Ravenstone. They joined the Premier Division of the North Leicestershire League in 1974 and were runners-up in 1976–77. The club were relegated to Division One at the end of the 1978–79 season, but returned to the Premier Division after being promoted in 1980–81. After finishing as runners-up in 1985–86 and 1986–87, they went on to win the Premier Division in 1988–89 and 1989–90, and moved up to Division One of the Leicestershire Senior League in 1991.

In 1995 the club moved to nearby Coalville after being unable to upgrade their Ravenslea ground, and were renamed Coalville Football Club. In 1996–97 they finished second in Division One and were promoted to the Premier Division. The club adopted their current name in 1998, and won the Leicestershire and Rutland Senior Cup in 1999–2000. They were Premier Division champions in 2001–02 and 2002–03, after which they were promoted to the Midland Alliance. In 2004–05 the club entered the FA Cup for the first time, and reached the first round, eventually losing 1–0 at Second Division Wycombe Wanderers. They were league runners-up in 2009–10, and the following season saw them reach the final of the FA Vase, losing 3–2 to Whitley Bay at Wembley Stadium. They also won the Midland Alliance, scoring 153 goals in the process and earning promotion to Division One South of the Northern Premier League.

In 2012–13 Coalville won the Westerby Cup, beating Loughborough Dynamo 2–1 in the final at the King Power Stadium. They were also Division One South runners-up and qualified for the promotion play-offs. However, they lost 2–1 to Chasetown in the semi-finals. The following season saw them finish as runners-up again. However, they lost the play-off semi-final against Mickleover Sports. In 2015–16 they qualified for the play-offs again. After beating Basford United 5–0 in the semi-finals, they defeated Shaw Lane 3–1 to earn promotion to the Premier Division.

The 2017–18 season saw Coalville win the Leicestershire & Rutland Challenge Cup with a 7–6 victory on penalties against Loughborough Dynamo. At the end of the season they were transferred to the Premier Central division of the Southern League as part of the restructuring of the non-League pyramid. The club retained the Leicestershire & Rutland Challenge Cup the following season, beating Loughborough University 4–1 in the final. In 2022–23 they reached the first round of the FA Cup again, losing 4–1 at Charlton Athletic. They finished the league season in second place, missing out on the league title on goal difference. In the subsequent promotion play-offs, they lost 4–3 on penalties to Rushall Olympic in the semi-finals after a 1–1 draw.

At the end of the 2023–24 season Coalville withdrew from the Southern League and announced they were shutting down their men's first team. However, they subsequently joined Division One of the United Counties League, dropping three levels. In 2025–26 the club finished third in Division One, going on beat Stapleford Town 1–0 in the play-off semi-finals, before losing on penalties to Retford United in the final. The season also saw them win the Leicestershire & Rutland Senior Cup, defeating Lutterworth Athletic reserves on penalties.

== Ground ==
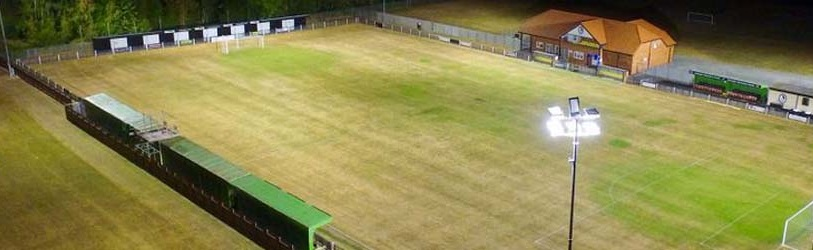
The Owen Street Sports Ground

When based in Ravenstone, the club played at Ravenslea. However, after the parish council refused the club permission to erect floodlights, they moved to the Owen Street Sports Ground in Coalville. Floodlights were installed at the new ground in 1996.

== Managerial history ==
Period	Name
2001–2006	Lee Harriman
2006–2007	Brendon Phillips
2007–2014	Adam Stevens
2014	Jimmy Gray
2014–2018	Tommy Brookbanks
2018–2024	Adam Stevens
2024	Ian King
2024–2025	Ash Brown
2025–	Carl Adams

== Honours ==
- Northern Premier League
  - Division One South Play-Off Winners 2015-16
- Midland Alliance
  - Champions 2010–11
- Leicestershire Senior League
  - Champions 2001–02, 2002–03
- North Leicestershire League
  - Premier Division champions 1988–89, 1989–90
  - Cobbin Trophy winners 1989–90
  - Junior Cup winners 1985–86
- Coalville & District League
  - Division One champions 1952–53
  - Division Two champions 1933–34
- Leicestershire and Rutland Senior Cup
  - Winners 1999–2000, 2025–26
- Leicestershire and Rutland Challenge Cup (aka. Westerby Cup)
  - Winners 2013-14, 2017–18, 2018–19
- Leicestershire & Rutland Junior Cup
  - Winners 1986–87
- Leicestershire County Junior Cup North
  - Winners 1948–49, 1949–50
- Coalville & District Charity Cup
  - Winners 1952–53, 1999-2000
- Coalville League Knockout Cup
  - Winners 1947-48
- County Medals - Coalville Section
  - Winners 1933-34

== Records ==
- Highest league finish: Second in the Southern League Premier Division Central, 2022–23.
- Best FA Cup performance: First round proper, 2004–05 and 2022–23.
- Best FA Trophy performance: Quarter-finals, 2023–24.
- Best FA Vase performance: Runners-up, 2010–11.
- Record competitive win: 24–0 against Nailstone All Saints, Coalville & District Amateur League Division Two, 24 March 1934, playing as Ravenstone Miners Athletic.
- Record competitive defeat: 0–13 against Coalville Old Edwardians, Coalville & District Amateur League Division One, 5 March 1966, playing as Ravenstone.
- Most league goals in a season: 153 in 44 matches, Midland Alliance, 2010–11.
- Most goals in a competitive season: 190 in 59 matches, 2010–11.
- Most competitive wins in a season: 42, 2010–11.
- Longest unbeaten run in all competitions: 24 matches, 2 November 2002 to 26 April 2003.
- Unbeaten league season: 2002–03, Leicestershire Senior League Premier Division, with 29 wins and five draws from 34 matches.
- Most appearances: Nigel Simms.

== See also ==
- Coalville Town F.C. players
- Coalville Town F.C. managers
