= Jack Kelleher =

English football player

Personal information
- Full name: Gino James T. J. Kelleher
- Date of birth: 22 February 1996 (age 30)
- Place of birth: Liverpool, England
- Height: 1.88 m (6 ft 2 in)
- Position: Forward

Youth career
- 2006–2012: Everton
- 2012–2014: Stoke City
- 2013–2015: Morecambe

Senior career*
Years	Team	Apps	(Gls)
2015–2016	Morecambe	3	(0)
2015	→ Kendal Town (loan)	28	(21)
2016-2017	Bradford Park Avenue	4	(5)
- * Club domestic league appearances and goals as of 14:33, 23 November 2015 (UTC)

Gino James T. J. "Jack" Kelleher (born 22 February 1996) is an English footballer.

== Career ==
Kelleher began his career playing in the youth teams at Everton and Stoke City before joining Morecambe in 2013. He gained experience out on loan at Kendal Town and made his professional debut on 24 October 2015 in a 1–0 defeat against Leyton Orient. He was released by Morecambe in May 2016.
