= Basford United F.C. =

English football club

Coordinates: 52°59′16″N 1°11′23″W

Basford United
- Full name: Basford United Football Club
- Nicknames: The Lions, The Ambers
- Founded: 1900
- Ground: Greenwich Avenue, Basford
- Capacity: 2,400
- Chairman: David Lilley
- Manager: Gary Setchell
- League: Northern Premier League Division One Midlands
- 2025–26: Northern Premier League Division One Midlands, 3rd of 22
Home colours	Away colours	Third colours

Basford United Football Club is a football club based in Basford, a suburb of Nottingham, England. They are currently members of the Northern Premier League Division One Midlands and play at Greenwich Avenue.

== History ==
Basford United was formed in 1900 at the Old Pear Tree Inn. They initially played in the Notts Combination, winning the league cup in 1903–04, before switching to the Notts Alliance in 1904. They won the league in their first season, and again in 1906–07 and 1919–20. The club were later relegated to Division Two, which they won in 1929–30.

During World War II the club played in the Notts Amateur Alliance, returning to the Notts Alliance after the war. The 1946–47 season saw them win the Notts Senior Cup. They were relegated to Division Two in 1970–71, although they soon returned to the Senior Division. After finishing bottom of the table in 1981–82 they were relegated again. The 1984–85 season saw them finish as runners-up in Division One, earning promotion back to the Senior Division. In 1987–88 they won the Notts Senior Cup again, beating Hucknall Town in the final.

After finishing second-from-bottom in 1991–92, Basford were relegated to Division One again. However, a second-place finish in 1993–94 saw them promoted again. They were relegated again in 1995–96, and despite winning Division One in 1997–98, they were relegated back to the division after finishing bottom of the Senior Division the following season. They withdrew from the league (now replaced by the Notts Senior League) during the 2005–06 season. However, they returned to the Senior Division the following season. After finishing as runners-up in 2009–10 and 2010–11, Basford switched to the South Division of the Central Midlands League.

Basford won the division at the first attempt (and the league's Floodlit Trophy), earning promotion to the East Midlands Counties League. After a second successive title in 2012–13 (also becoming the first club to win both the league and the league cup), they were promoted to the Premier Division of the Northern Counties East League. They finished fifth in 2013–14, and were transferred to the Premier Division of the new Midland League for the 2014–15 season. They went on to win the inaugural league title, earning promotion to Division One South of the Northern Premier League, as well as winning the Notts Senior Cup for a third time. A fourth-place finish in 2015–16 saw them qualify for the promotion play-offs, in which they lost 5–0 to Coalville Town in the semi-finals. The season also saw them retained the Notts Senior Cup.

In 2017–18 Basford were Division One South champions, earning promotion to the Premier Division. They also won the Notts Senior Cup, and retained it the following season. At the end of the 2021–22 season the club were transferred to the Premier Division Central of the Southern League. They were transferred back to the Northern Premier League's Premier Division a year later. In 2024–25 the club finished second-from-bottom of the Premier Division and were relegated to Division One Midlands. They finished third in Division One Midlands the following season, before losing on penalties to Belper Town in the play-off semi-finals.

== Ground ==
Shortly after their formation, the club began playing at the Dolly Tub pitch, which later became the Highbury housing estate. They moved to Catchems Corner in 1903, remaining there until moving to Vernon Avenue in 1930. They subsequently moved to Mill Street, before Greenwich Avenue became their home ground in 1991 after Mill Street was used for housing.

== Staff ==
=== Coaching staff ===
Role	Name	
Manager	Gary Setchell	
Assistant Manager	Darren Edey	
Academy Lead	Matt Carbon	
Player-Coach	Henri Wilder	Source: Northern Premier League

=== Club officials ===
Role	Name
Chairman	David Lilley
Source: Basford United

== Honours ==
- Northern Premier League
  - Division One South champions 2017–18
- Midland League
  - Premier Division champions 2014–15
- East Midlands Counties League
  - Champions 2012–13
  - League Cup winners 2012–13
- Central Midlands League
  - South Division champions 2011–12
  - Floodlit Trophy winners 2011–12
- Notts Amateur Alliance
  - Premier Division champions 2005–06
- Notts Alliance
  - Division One champions 1904–05, 1906–07, 1919–20
  - Division Two champions 1929–30
  - League Cup winners 1914–15, 1938–39
- Notts Combination
  - League Cup winners 1903–04
- Notts Senior Cup
  - Winners 1946–47, 1987–88, 2014–15, 2015–16, 2017–18, 2018–19
- Notts FA Intermediate Cup
  - Winners 2005–06

== Records ==
- Best FA Cup performance: Fourth qualifying round, 2022–23
- Best FA Trophy performance: Fourth round, 2024–25
- Best FA Vase performance: Second round, 2012–13
- Record attendance: 3,500 vs Grantham, 1937

== See also ==
- Basford United F.C. players
- Basford United F.C. managers
