= Loughborough Dynamo F.C. =

English football club

Coordinates: 52°45′7.088″N 1°14′3.070″W

Loughborough Dynamo
- Full name: Loughborough Dynamo Football Club
- Nickname: The Moes
- Founded: 1955
- Ground: Nanpantan Sports Ground, Loughborough
- Capacity: 1,500 (250 seated)
- Chairman: Darren Rodgers and Mario Smyth
- League: Leicestershire Senior League Division One
- 2024–25: Leicestershire Senior League Division One, 6th of 16
- Website: https://www.pitchero.com/clubs/loughboroughdynamo
Home colours	Away colours

Loughborough Dynamo Football Club is a community interest football club based in Loughborough, Leicestershire, England. They are currently members of the Leicestershire Senior League Division One and play at the Nanpantan Sports Ground.

== History ==
The club was established in 1955 by pupils from Loughborough Grammar School, taking its name from Dynamo Moscow, who had recently visited England to play Wolverhampton Wanderers, with the colours taken from Wolverhampton Wanderers. After playing friendly matches for two years, they entered Division Three of the Loughborough Alliance in 1957. The club won the Division Three title in 1959–60 and were promoted to Division Two. The following season saw them finish as runners-up in Division Two, earning promotion to Division One. They went on to finish as runners-up in Division One in 1962–63 and 1963–64 before winning the Division One title in 1964–65.

Loughborough Dynamo then moved up to Division Two of the Leicester & District League. They were promoted to Division One in their first season and then again to the Premier Division in 1966–67. Although the club were relegated at the end of the 1968–69 season, they won the Division One title in 1969–70 to secure an immediate promotion back to the Premier Division. In 1972 the club transferred to Division One of the East Midlands Regional League before moving to the Premier Division of the Central Alliance the following season. However, after finishing bottom of the division, the club dropped back into Division Two of the Leicester & District League.

The 1979–80 season saw Loughborough promoted to Division One. In 1980–81 they were Division One runners-up, earning promotion to the Premier Division. Although the club were relegated back to Division One at the end of the 1982–83 season, they were promoted to the Premier Division again in 1986–87 after finishing third in Division One. In 1989 the club moved up to Division One of the Leicestershire Senior League. They won the division in 2001–02 and were promoted to the Premier Division. The following season saw them win the Leicestershire and Rutland Senior Cup. In 2003–04 the club retained the Senior Cup and were Premier Division champions, resulting in promotion to the Midland Alliance.

In 2007–08 Loughborough were Midland Alliance runners-up and were promoted to Division One South of the Northern Premier League. Despite finishing sixth in Division One Midlands in 2023–24, the club opted to take voluntary relegation to Division One of the Leicestershire Senior League to focus on financial security.

== Honours ==
- Leicestershire Senior League
  - Premier Division champions 2003–04
  - Division One champions 2001–02
  - Beacon Bitter Cup winners 2003–04
- Leicester & District League
  - Division One champions 1969–70
  - 3 Sons Trophy winners 1980–81
- Loughborough Alliance
  - Division One champions 1964–65
  - Division Three champions 1959–60
  - Cobin Trophy winners 1962–63, 1963–64, 1964–65
- Leicestershire and Rutland Senior Cup
  - Winners 2002–03, 2003–04
- Loughborough Charity Cup
  - Winners 1987–88, 2003–04, 2010–11
- County FA President's Trophy
  - Winners 2003–04
- County FA Westerby Challenge Cup
  - Winners 2009–10, 2011–12

== Records ==
- Best FA Cup performance: Second qualifying round, 2010–11, 2011–12, 2019–20
- Best FA Trophy performance: Third qualifying round, 2020–21
- Best FA Vase performance: Second round, 2004–05
- Record attendance: 622 vs Shepshed Dynamo, Northern Premier League Division One Midlands, 3 January 2022

== See also ==
- Loughborough Dynamo F.C. players
- Loughborough Dynamo F.C. managers
