= 2016–17 Notts County F.C. season =

Notts County
2016–17 season
- Owner: Ray Trew (until 12 January); Alan Hardy
- Manager: John Sheridan (until 2 January); Kevin Nolan (from 12 January)
- Stadium: Meadow Lane
- League Two: 16th
- FA Cup: Second round (eliminated by Peterborough United)
- League Cup: First round> (eliminated by Scunthorpe United)
- League Trophy: Group stage
- Highest home attendance: 12,184
- Lowest home attendance: 2,736
- Average home league attendance: 5,957
Home colours	Away colours

The 2016–17 season was Notts County's 154th season in their history and their second consecutive season in League Two. Along with League Two, the club will also compete in the FA Cup, League Cup and League Trophy. The season covers the period from 1 July 2016 to 30 June 2017.

== First-Team Squad ==
No.	Name	Pos.	Nat.	Place of Birth	Age	Apps	Goals	Signed from	Date signed	Fee	Ends
Goalkeepers
1	Adam Collin	GK	(England)	Penrith	41	47	0	Rotherham United	1 July 2016	Free	2018
13	Scott Loach	GK	(England)	Nottingham	29	23	0	Rotherham United	15 July 2015	Free	2017
Defenders
2	Matt Tootle	RB	(England)	Knowsley	36	38	2	Shrewsbury Town	1 July 2016	Free	2018
3	Carl Dickinson	LB	(England)	Swadlincote	39	40	0	Port Vale	1 July 2016	Free	2018
5	Richard Duffy	CB	(Wales)	Swansea	41	47	4	Eastleigh	1 July 2016	Free	2017
6	Haydn Hollis	CB	(England)	Selston	34	133	7	Academy	1 July 2011	Trainee	2017
16	Marc Bola	LB	(England)	Greenwich	19	13	0	Arsenal	31 January 2017	Loan	2017
18	Elliott Hewitt	RB	(Wales)	Rhyl	32	74	2	Ipswich Town	4 August 2015	Free	2019
19	Jordan Richards	RB	(England)	Nottingham	29	16	0	Academy	1 July 2015	Trainee	Undisclosed
20	Wes Atkinson	RB	(England)	West Bromwich	22	20	0	West Bromwich Albion	20 July 2015	Free	2017
23	Josh Clackstone	RB	(England)	Beverley	20	8	0	Hull City	31 January 2017	Loan	2017
31	Thierry Audel	CB	(France)	Nice	30	53	3	Macclesfield Town	3 August 2015	Undisclosed	2017
37	Mike Edwards	CB	(England)	Hessle	46	352	30	Carlisle United	18 August 2014	Free	2017
Midfielders
4	Alan Smith	CM	(England)	Rothwell	46	81	0	Milton Keynes Dons	1 July 2014	Free	2017
8	Michael O'Connor	CM	(Northern Ireland)	Belfast	39	34	2	Port Vale	1 July 2016	Free	2018
10	Mark Yeates	LW	(Republic of Ireland)	Tallaght	41	12	0	Blackpool	30 January 2017	Free	2017
12	Robert Milsom	CM	(England)	Redhill	39	59	0	Rotherham United	1 July 2015	Free	2017
15	Curtis Thompson	RM	(England)	Nottingham	33	96	2	Academy	1 July 2011	Trainee	2017
17	Jorge Grant	CM	(England)	Banbury	22	17	6	Nottingham Forest	31 January 2017	Loan	2017
44	Kevin Nolan	AM	(England)	Liverpool	44	0	0	Free agent	30 January 2017	Free	Undisclosed
47	Alex Howes	MF	(England)		26	2	0	Academy		Trainee	Undisclosed
	Terry Hawkridge	RM	(England)	Nottingham	36	0	0	Lincoln City	1 July 2017	Free	2019
Forwards
9	Shola Ameobi	CF	(Nigeria)	Zaria	45	17	4	Fleetwood Town	3 February 2017	Free	2017
11	Jonathan Forte	LW	(Barbados)	Sheffield	40	70	23	Oldham Athletic	1 July 2016	Free	Undisclosed
21	Montel Gibson	CF	(England)	Nottingham	19	5	0	Academy	1 July 2016	Trainee	2017
24	Adam Campbell	CF	(England)	North Shields	22	85	12	Newcastle United	13 July 2015	Free	2017
28	Sam Osborne	CF	(England)	Nottingham		3	0	Dunkirk	1 July 2016	Free	Undisclosed
30	Jon Stead	CF	(England)	Huddersfield	43	89	28	Huddersfield Town	2 July 2015	Free	2017

== Statistics ==
As of 20 May 2017

No.	Pos	Nat	Player	Total		League Two		FA Cup		League Cup		League Trophy	
No.	Pos	Nat	Player	Apps	Goals	Apps	Goals	Apps	Goals	Apps	Goals	Apps	Goals
1	GK	(England) ENG	Adam Collin	47	0	43+0	0	3+0	0	1+0	0	0+0	0
2	DF	(England) ENG	Matt Tootle	37	2	32+1	2	3+0	0	1+0	0	0+0	0
3	DF	(England) ENG	Carl Dickinson	37	0	31+1	0	3+0	0	1+0	0	1+0	0
4	MF	(England) ENG	Alan Smith	22	0	7+12	0	1+1	0	1+0	0	0+0	0
5	DF	(Wales) WAL	Richard Duffy	45	4	41+0	4	3+0	0	1+0	0	0+0	0
6	DF	(England) ENG	Haydn Hollis	36	1	30+1	1	3+0	0	1+0	0	1+0	0
7	MF	(Netherlands) NED	Genaro Snijders	7	1	3+2	0	1+0	0	0+0	0	1+0	1
8	MF	(Northern Ireland) NIR	Michael O'Connor	34	2	30+2	2	2+0	0	0+0	0	0+0	0
9	FW	(Nigeria) NGR	Shola Ameobi	17	4	13+4	4	0+0	0	0+0	0	0+0	0
10	MF	(Republic of Ireland) IRL	Mark Yeates	14	0	11+3	0	0+0	0	0+0	0	0+0	0
11	FW	(Barbados) BRB	Jonathan Forte	39	9	28+7	8	3+1	1	0+0	0	0+0	0
12	MF	(England) ENG	Robert Milsom	42	0	35+2	0	4+0	0	0+0	0	0+1	0
13	GK	(England) ENG	Scott Loach	5	0	3+0	0	1+0	0	0+0	0	1+0	0
14	FW	(England) ENG	Tahvon Campbell	11	0	1+10	0	0+0	0	0+0	0	0+0	0
15	MF	(England) ENG	Curtis Thompson	14	0	11+2	0	1+0	0	0+0	0	0+0	0
16	DF	(England) ENG	Marc Bola	13	0	10+3	0	0+0	0	0+0	0	0+0	0
17	MF	(England) ENG	Jorge Grant	17	5	15+2	5	0+0	0	0+0	0	0+0	0
18	DF	(Wales) WAL	Elliott Hewitt	31	2	23+6	2	0+1	0	0+0	0	0+1	0
19	DF	(England) ENG	Jordan Richards	15	0	7+5	0	2+0	0	0+0	0	1+0	0
20	DF	(England) ENG	Wes Atkinson	2	0	0+0	0	0+0	0	0+1	0	0+1	0
21	FW	(England) ENG	Montel Gibson	1	0	0+1	0	0+0	0	0+0	0	0+0	0
23	DF	(England) ENG	Josh Clackstone	8	0	7+1	0	0+0	0	0+0	0	0+0	0
24	FW	(England) ENG	Adam Campbell	35	7	21+8	4	2+2	3	0+1	0	1+0	0
26	FW	(Republic of Ireland) IRL	Graham Burke	9	1	2+3	0	2+0	0	1+0	0	1+0	1
28	FW	(England) ENG	Sam Osborne	3	0	1+2	0	0+0	0	0+0	0	0+0	0
30	FW	(England) ENG	Jon Stead	41	14	37+1	14	1+1	0	1+0	0	0+0	0
31	DF	(France) FRA	Thierry Audel	19	1	12+4	1	1+0	0	1+0	0	1+0	0
37	DF	(England) ENG	Mike Edwards	2	0	2+0	0	0+0	0	0+0	0	0+0	0
47	MF	(England) ENG	Alex Howes	2	0	1+1	0	0+0	0	0+0	0	0+0	0
Player(s) who left the club:
23	MF	(England) ENG	Alex Rodman	19	1	15+1	1	1+0	0	1+0	0	1+0	0
33	MF	(Belgium) BEL	Stanley Aborah	10	0	6+2	0	1+0	0	0+0	0	1+0	0
Player(s) who returned to their parent club:
9	FW	(England) ENG	Vadaine Oliver	23	1	2+17	1	2+1	0	1+0	0	0+0	0
14	DF	(England) ENG	Louis Laing	25	2	19+2	1	3+0	1	0+0	0	1+0	0
39	FW	(Wales) WAL	Aaron Collins	22	3	3+15	2	1+3	1	0+0	0	0+0	0

=== Goals record ===
As of 7 May 2017

Rank	No.	Nat.	Po.	Name	League Two	FA Cup	League Cup	League Trophy	Total
1	30	(England)	CF	Jon Stead	14	0	0	0	14
2	11	(Barbados)	LW	Jonathan Forte	8	1	0	0	9
3	24	(England)	CF	Adam Campbell	4	3	0	0	7
4	17	(England)	CM	Jorge Grant	6	0	0	0	6
5	5	(Wales)	CB	Richard Duffy	4	0	0	0	4
5	9	(Nigeria)	CF	Shola Ameobi	4	0	0	0	4
7	39	(Wales)	CF	Aaron Collins	2	1	0	0	3
8	2	(England)	RB	Matt Tootle	2	0	0	0	2
8	8	(Northern Ireland)	CM	Michael O'Connor	2	0	0	0	2
8	~~14~~	(England)	CB	Louis Laing	1	1	0	0	2
8	18	(Wales)	RB	Elliott Hewitt	2	0	0	0	2
12	6	(England)	CB	Haydn Hollis	1	0	0	0	1
12	7	(Netherlands)	RW	Genaro Snijders	0	0	0	1	1
12	~~9~~	(England)	CF	Vadaine Oliver	1	0	0	0	1
12	~~23~~	(England)	RM	Alex Rodman	1	0	0	0	1
12	26	(Republic of Ireland)	SS	Graham Burke	0	0	0	1	1
12	31	(France)	CB	Thierry Audel	1	0	0	0	1
Own Goals					1	0	0	0	1
Total					53	6	0	2	61

=== Disciplinary record ===
As of 7 May 2017

Rank	No.	Nat.	Po.	Name	League Two			FA Cup			League Cup			League Trophy			Total		
Rank	No.	Nat.	Po.	Name	Yellow card	(yellow card) (yellow-red card)	Red card	Yellow card	(yellow card) (yellow-red card)	Red card	Yellow card	(yellow card) (yellow-red card)	Red card	Yellow card	(yellow card) (yellow-red card)	Red card	Yellow card	(yellow card) (yellow-red card)	Red card
1	8	(Northern Ireland)	CM	Michael O'Connor	11	0	1	1	0	0	0	0	0	0	0	0	12	0	1
2	3	(England)	LB	Carl Dickinson	10	0	0	1	0	0	0	0	0	0	0	0	11	0	0
3	12	(England)	CM	Robert Milsom	10	0	0	0	0	0	0	0	0	0	0	0	10	0	0
4	5	(Wales)	CB	Richard Duffy	9	0	0	0	0	0	0	0	0	0	0	0	9	0	0
5	~~9~~	(England)	CF	Vadaine Oliver	4	0	1	1	0	0	0	0	0	0	0	0	5	0	1
6	2	(England)	RB	Matt Tootle	4	0	0	1	0	0	0	0	0	0	0	0	5	0	0
6	~~14~~	(England)	CB	Louis Laing	1	1	0	2	0	0	0	0	0	0	0	0	3	1	0
8	4	(England)	CM	Alan Smith	3	0	0	0	0	0	0	0	0	1	0	0	4	0	0
8	9	(Nigeria)	CF	Shola Ameobi	4	0	0	0	0	0	0	0	0	0	0	0	4	0	0
8	15	(England)	RW	Curtis Thompson	1	1	0	0	0	0	0	0	0	0	0	0	1	1	0
11	6	(England)	CB	Haydn Hollis	3	0	0	0	0	0	0	0	0	0	0	0	3	0	0
11	11	(Barbados)	LW	Jonathan Forte	3	0	0	0	0	0	0	0	0	0	0	0	3	0	0
11	16	(England)	LB	Marc Bola	3	0	0	0	0	0	0	0	0	0	0	0	3	0	0
11	18	(Wales)	RB	Elliott Hewitt	3	0	0	0	0	0	0	0	0	0	0	0	3	0	0
11	33	(Belgium)	CM	Stanley Aborah	2	0	0	0	0	0	0	0	0	1	0	0	3	0	0
16	10	(Republic of Ireland)	LW	Mark Yeates	1	0	1	0	0	0	0	0	0	1	0	0	2	0	1
16	17	(England)	CM	Jorge Grant	2	0	0	0	0	0	0	0	0	0	0	0	2	0	0
16	23	(England)	RB	Josh Clackstone	2	0	0	0	0	0	0	0	0	0	0	0	2	0	0
16	24	(England)	CF	Adam Campbell	1	0	0	1	0	0	0	0	0	0	0	0	2	0	0
16	31	(France)	CB	Thierry Audel	2	0	0	0	0	0	0	0	0	0	0	0	2	0	0
16	39	(Wales)	CF	Aaron Collins	1	0	1	0	0	0	0	0	0	0	0	0	1	0	1
22	19	(England)	RB	Jordan Richards	1	0	0	0	0	0	0	0	0	0	0	0	1	0	0
22	20	(England)	RB	Wes Atkinson	0	0	0	0	0	0	0	0	0	0	0	1	0	0	1
Total					81	2	4	7	0	0	0	0	0	3	0	1	91	2	5

=== Contracts ===
Date	Position	Nationality	Name	Status	Contract Length	Expiry Date	Ref.
19 May 2017	RB	(Wales)	Elliott Hewitt	Signed	2 years	June 2019	

== Transfers ==
=== Transfers in ===
Date from	Position	Nationality	Name	From	Fee	Ref.
1 July 2016	GK	(England)	Adam Collin	Rotherham United	Free transfer	
1 July 2016	LB	(England)	Carl Dickinson	Port Vale	Free transfer	
1 July 2016	CB	(Wales)	Richard Duffy	Port Vale	Free transfer	
1 July 2016	LW	(Barbados)	Jonathan Forte	Oldham Athletic	Free transfer	
1 July 2016	CM	(Northern Ireland)	Michael O'Connor	Port Vale	Free transfer	
1 July 2016	LW	(England)	Alex Rodman	Newport County	Free transfer	
1 July 2016	RB	(England)	Matt Tootle	Shrewsbury Town	Free transfer	
30 January 2017	LW	(Republic of Ireland)	Mark Yeates	Blackpool	Undisclosed	
4 February 2017	CF	(Nigeria)	Shola Ameobi	Fleetwood Town	Free transfer	

=== Transfers out ===
Date from	Position	Nationality	Name	To	Fee	Ref.
1 July 2016	LB	(England)	Blair Adams	Cambridge United	Released	(Note: Following Adams' release, he joined Cambridge United.)
1 July 2016	CB	(England)	Jordan Aghatise	Free agent	Released	
1 July 2016	RB	(Togo)	Mawouna Amevor	Dordrecht	Mutual consent	(Note: Following Amevor's release, he joined Dordrecht.)
1 July 2016	LM	(England)	Jason Banton	Crawley Town	Released	(Note: Following Banton's release, he joined Crawley Town.)
1 July 2016	CB	(England)	Scot Bennett	Newport County	Mutual consent	(Note: Following Bennett's departure, he joined Newport County.)
1 July 2016	CF	(England)	Colby Bishop	Worcester City	Released	(Note: Following Bishop's release, he joined Worcester City.)
1 July 2016	GK	(Northern Ireland)	Roy Carroll	Linfield	Released	(Note: Following Carroll's release, he joined Linfield.)
1 July 2016	AM	(Republic of Ireland)	Will Hayhurst	Free agent	Released	
1 July 2016	CB	(England)	Taylor McKenzie	Chesham United	Released	(Note: Following McKenzie's release, he joined Chesham United.)
1 July 2016	CF	(Republic of Ireland)	Ronan Murray	Free agent	Released	
1 July 2016	CM	(England)	Liam Noble	Forest Green Rovers	Released	(Note: Following Noble's release, he joined Forest Green Rovers.)
1 July 2016	CM	(England)	Lartey Sarpong	Billericay Town	Released	(Note: Following Sarpong's release, he joined Billericay Town.)
1 July 2016	SS	(Slovenia)	Filip Valenčič	Kemi Kings	Released	(Note: Following Valenčič's release, he joined Kemi Kings.)
2 July 2016	LW	(England)	Kyle De Silva	Eindhoven	Free transfer	
25 August 2016	CF	(England)	Izale McLeod	Yeovil Town	Mutual consent	(Note: Following McLeod's mutual decision to leave, he joined Yeovil Town.)
5 January 2017	LW	(England)	Alex Rodman	Shrewsbury Town	Released	(Note: Following Rodman's release, he joined Shrewsbury Town.)
31 January 2017	CM	(Belgium)	Stanley Aborah	Portsmouth	Mutual consent	(Note: Following Stanley Aborah's departure, he joined Portsmouth.)

=== Loans in ===
Date from	Position	Nationality	Name	From	Date until	Ref.
2 August 2016	CF	(England)	Vadaine Oliver	York City	7 January 2017	
15 August 2016	CB	(England)	Louis Laing	Motherwell	14 January 2017	
31 August 2016	CF	(Wales)	Aaron Collins	Wolverhampton Wanderers	9 January 2017	
31 January 2017	LB	(England)	Marc Bola	Arsenal	End of Season	
31 January 2017	CF	(England)	Tahvon Campbell	West Bromwich Albion	End of Season	
31 January 2017	RB	(England)	Josh Clackstone	Hull City	End of Season	
31 January 2017	CM	(England)	Jorge Grant	Nottingham Forest	End of Season	

=== Loans out ===
Date from	Position	Nationality	Name	To	Date until	Ref.
19 August 2016	MF	(England)	Jack McMillan	Boston United	16 September 2016	
24 October 2016	RB	(England)	Wes Atkinson	Gateshead	21 November 2016	

== Competitions ==
=== Pre-season friendlies ===
12 July 2016 Friendly	Carlton Town	0–1	Notts County	Carlton
19:30		Report	Snijders 5'	Stadium: Bill Stokeld Stadium

19 July 2016 Friendly	Alfreton Town	0–0	Notts County	Alfreton
19:30				Stadium: North Street

23 July 2016 Friendly	Notts County	1–2	Nottingham Forest	Nottingham
15:00	Rodman 65'	Report	Osborn 57'; Paterson 77'	Stadium: Meadow Lane; Attendance: 9,007 (Away: 4,970)

26 July 2016 Friendly	Notts County	3–2	Walsall	Nottingham
19:45	Hollis 10'; Forte 11'; Stead 66'	Report	Bakayoko 71', 85'	Stadium: Meadow Lane; Attendance: 952 (135 away)

31 July 2016 Friendly	Notts County	1–0	Blackburn Rovers	Nottingham
15:00	Campbell 27'	Report		Stadium: Meadow Lane; Attendance: 1,411 (135 away)

=== League Two ===
==== League table ====
Pos	Team	Pld	W	D	L	GF	GA	GD	Pts
14	Grimsby Town	46	17	11	18	59	63	−4	62
15	Barnet	46	14	15	17	57	64	−7	57
16	Notts County	46	16	8	22	54	76	−22	56
17	Crewe Alexandra	46	14	13	19	58	67	−9	55
18	Morecambe	46	14	10	22	53	73	−20	52

Updated to match(es) played on 6 May 2017. Source: BBC Sport
Rules for classification: 1) Points; 2) Goal difference; 3) Number of goals scored

==== Results by matchday ====
Round	1	2	3	4	5	6	7	8	9	10	11	12	13	14	15	16	17	18	19	20	21	22	23	24	25	26	27	28	29	30	31	32	33	34	35	36	37	38	39	40	41	42	43	44	45	46
Ground	A	H	H	A	A	H	H	A	H	A	A	H	H	A	H	A	H	H	A	H	A	H	H	A	A	H	A	H	A	H	H	A	H	A	A	H	A	H	A	H	A	A	H	A	H	A
Result	L	D	L	W	W	D	L	W	W	W	L	L	D	W	D	L	L	L	L	L	L	L	L	L	L	D	L	W	L	W	D	W	D	W	L	W	L	W	W	W	W	D	L	L	W	L
Position	23	22	21	19	11	12	17	12	9	5	8	10	12	6	6	8	12	15	19	20	20	21	22	22	22	23	23	21	22	22	21	20	21	19	22	19	21	20	20	16	15	15	15	16	16	16

Updated to match(es) played on 6 May 2017. Source: Statto.com
A = Away; H = Home; W = Win; D = Draw; L = Loss

==== Matches ====
6 August 2016 1	Yeovil Town	2–0	Notts County	Yeovil
15:00 BST	Dawson 16'; Khan 23'	Report		Stadium: Huish Park; Attendance: 3,715; Referee: Ollie Yates

13 August 2016 2	Notts County	1–1	Stevenage	Nottingham
15:00 BST	Stead 18'; O'Connor (yellow card) 62'; Duffy (yellow card) 77'; Hollis (yellow card) 83'	Report	Kennedy 9'; Tonge (yellow card) 23'	Stadium: Meadow Lane; Attendance: 3,987; Referee: Rob Jones

16 August 2016 3	Notts County	1–2	Plymouth Argyle	Nottingham
19:45 BST	Dickinson (yellow card) 7'; Stead 17'; Aborah (yellow card) 41'	Report	Jervis 14'; Bulvītis 34'; Miller (yellow card) 37'; Smith (yellow card) 41'; Songo'o (yellow card) 84'; McCormick (yellow card) 88'; Sawyer (yellow card) 90+4'	Stadium: Meadow Lane; Attendance: 3,718; Referee: Mark Heywood

20 August 2016 4	Hartlepool United	1–2	Notts County	Hartlepool
15:00 BST	Nsiala 8'; Paynter (yellow card) 69'	Report	Laing 65'; Stead 76'	Stadium: Victoria Park; Attendance: 3,708; Referee: Michael Denton

27 August 2016 5	Crawley Town	1–3	Notts County	Crawley
15:00 BST	Collins (yellow card) 3'; Boldewijn 47'; McNerney (yellow card) 81'; Young (yellow card) 81'	Report	Collins 54' (o.g.); Campbell 61'; Dickinson (yellow card) 64'; Oliver (yellow card) 72'; Stead 87' (pen.)	Stadium: Broadfield Stadium; Attendance: 2,087; Referee: John Busby

3 September 2016 6	Notts County	2–2	Grimsby Town	Nottingham
15:00 BST	Forte 77'; Collins 89'	Report	Pearson 34'; Bogle 56'	Stadium: Meadow Lane; Attendance: 6,861; Referee: Nigel Miller

10 September 2016 7	Notts County	0–2	Accrington Stanley	Nottingham
15:00 BST	Audel (yellow card) 21'; Duffy (yellow card) 28'	Report	O'Sullivan 17'; Donacien (yellow card) 31'; Conneely (yellow card) 54'; Boco 67'	Stadium: Meadow Lane Stadium; Attendance: 3,988; Referee: Brett Huxtable

17 September 2016 8	Cheltenham Town	2–3	Notts County	Cheltenham
15:00 BST	Wright (yellow card) 14' (goal) 24'; Pell (yellow card) 20' (goal) 55'	Report	Forte 4' (yellow card) 67'; Dickinson (yellow card) 16'; Milsom (yellow card) 21'; Stead 41', 56'	Stadium: LCI Rail Stadium; Attendance: 3,067; Referee: John Brooks

24 September 2016 9	Notts County	3–1	Leyton Orient	Nottingham
15:00 BST	Duffy (yellow card) 45'; Forte 53'; Stead 55'; Laing (yellow card) 63' (yellow-red card) 69'; Milsom (yellow card) 72'; Collins 90+2'	Report	McCallum (yellow card) 78' (goal) 86'	Stadium: Meadow Lane Stadium; Attendance: 4,289; Referee: Brendan Malone

27 September 2016 10	Exeter City	0–2	Notts County	Exeter
19:45 BST		Report	Stead 3', 34'; Dickinson (yellow card) 56'; Duffy (yellow card) 75'; Collins (yellow card) 83'	Stadium: St. James' Park; Attendance: 3,081; Referee: Kevin Johnson

8 October 2016 11	Mansfield Town	3–1	Notts County	Mansfield
12:15 BST	McGuire (yellow card) 46'; Green 54', 90+1' (pen.); Bennett (yellow card) 82'; Gobern (yellow card) 90+4'; Henderson 90+4' (yellow card) 90+5'	Report	Oliver (yellow card) 71'; Rodman 82'	Stadium: One Call Stadium; Attendance: 5,763; Referee: Carl Boyeson

11 October 2016 12	Notts County	1–2	Morecambe	Nottingham
19:45 BST	Dickinson (yellow card) 33'; Forte (yellow card) 74'; Oliver 90+3'	Report	Barkhuizen 16', 55' (pen.); Edwards (yellow card) 85'	Stadium: Meadow Lane Stadium; Attendance: 3,507; Referee: Dean Whitestone

15 October 2016 13	Notts County	1–1	Crewe Alexandra	Nottingham
15:00 BST	Forte 80'	Report	Kiwomya 81'	Stadium: Meadow Lane Stadium; Attendance: 8,012; Referee: Lee Probert

22 October 2016 14	Portsmouth	1–2	Notts County	Portsmouth
15:00 BST	Chaplin 27'; Doyle (yellow card) 74'	Report	Campbell 21', 71'; Laing (yellow card) 48'; Collins (red card) 77'	Stadium: Fratton Park; Attendance: 17,269; Referee: Nigel Miller

29 October 2016 15	Notts County	0–0	Luton Town	Nottingham
15:00 BST	Duffy (yellow card) 57'; Hollis (yellow card) 58'; Oliver (penalty missed) 84'; Milsom (yellow card) 89'	Report	Rea (yellow card) 34'; Hylton (yellow card) 55'	Stadium: Meadow Lane Stadium; Attendance: 6,313; Referee: Michael Salisbury

12 November 2016 16	Blackpool	4–0	Notts County	Blackpool
15:00 GMT	Vassell 20', 87'; Daniel 48'; Matt 52'; Taylor (yellow card) 63'; Gnanduillet (yellow card) 80'	Report	Milsom (yellow card) 60'; Oliver (red card) 79'; Duffy (yellow card) 90+2'	Stadium: Bloomfield Road; Attendance: 3,443; Referee: Robert Jones

19 November 2016 17	Notts County	0–3	Newport County	Nottingham
15:00 GMT	Richards (yellow card) 74'; Smith (yellow card) 89'	Report	Rigg (penalty missed) 34' 34' (yellow card) 37'; Healey 38'; Sheehan 62'	Stadium: Meadow Lane Stadium; Attendance: 3,883; Referee: Andy Haines

22 November 2016 18	Notts County	0–1	Cambridge United	Nottingham
19:45 GMT	O'Connor (yellow card) 30'; Milsom (yellow card) 77'; Dickinson (yellow card) 88'	Report	Newton 26'; Norris (yellow card) 90+3'	Stadium: Meadow Lane Stadium; Attendance: 2,736; Referee: David Webb

26 November 2016 19	Barnet	3–2	Notts County	Canons Park, London
15:00 GMT	Dembélé 30'; Gambin 64', 74' (yellow card) 65'	Report	O'Connor 15' (yellow card) 58'; Tootle (yellow card) 67'; Forte 77'	Stadium: The Hive Stadium; Attendance: 1,958; Referee: Darren Handley

10 December 2016 20	Notts County	0–2	Wycombe Wanderers	Nottingham
15:00 GMT	O'Connor (red card) 45+4'; Duffy (yellow card) 48'; Dickinson (yellow card) 57'	Report	Akinfenwa 37' (yellow card) 49' (yellow-red card) 77'; Kashket 55'; Pierre (yellow card) 60'	Stadium: Meadow Lane Stadium; Attendance: 3,680; Referee: Eddie Ilderton

17 December 2016 21	Colchester United	2–1	Notts County	Colchester
15:00 GMT	Guthrie 24'; Slater (yellow card) 49'; Duffy 77' (o.g.)	Report	Hewitt 17'; Tootle (yellow card) 48'; Audel (yellow card) 75'; Dickinson (yellow card) 80'	Stadium: Weston Homes Community Stadium; Attendance: 3,385; Referee: Ross Joyce

26 December 2016 22	Notts County	0–1	Doncaster Rovers	Nottingham
15:00 GMT	Oliver (yellow card) 74'	Report	Williams 60' (yellow card) 86'; Mandeville (yellow card) 88'	Stadium: Meadow Lane Stadium; Attendance: 5,828; Referee: Darren Drysdale

31 December 2016 23	Notts County	2–3	Carlisle United	Nottingham
15:00 GMT	Stead 30'; Forte 39'	Report	Devitt (yellow card) 7'; Wyke 10'; Ibehre 45'; Joyce (yellow card) 56'; Kennedy 65'; Miller (yellow card) 90+3'	Stadium: Meadow Lane Stadium; Attendance: 3,825; Referee: Rob Jones

2 January 2017 24	Cambridge United	4–0	Notts County	Cambridge
15:00 GMT	Berry 18', 61'; Ikpeazu 57'; Mingoia (yellow card) 65' (goal) 69'	Report		Stadium: The R Costings Abbey Stadium; Attendance: 4,981; Referee: Brett Huxtable

7 January 2017 25	Morecambe	4–1	Notts County	Morecambe
15:00 GMT	Molyneux 2' (yellow card) 17'; Mullin 27'; Rose 31' (pen.); Fleming (red card) 45+1'; Wakefield (yellow card) 84'; Ellison 90+1'	Report	Hewitt (yellow card) 30'; Forte 80'; O'Connor (yellow card) 90+3'	Stadium: Globe Arena; Attendance: 1,315; Referee: Carl Boyeson

14 January 2017 26	Notts County	0–0	Mansfield Town	Nottingham
13:00 GMT	O'Connor (yellow card) 83'; Duffy (yellow card) 90+1'	Report		Stadium: Meadow Lane Stadium; Attendance: 11,328; Referee: Darren Bond

21 January 2017 27	Grimsby Town	2–0	Notts County	Cleethorpes
15:00 GMT	Bogle 27'; Clements (yellow card) 62'; Vernon 82'	Report	O'Connor (yellow card) 42'; Tootle (yellow card) 54'	Stadium: Blundell Park; Attendance: 5,421; Referee: Darren Handley

28 January 2017 28	Notts County	2–1	Crawley Town	Nottingham
15:00 GMT	Thompson (yellow card) 30' (yellow-red card) 72'; Audel 75'; Forte 90'	Report	Yorwerth (yellow card) 30'; Connolly (yellow card) 65'; Young (yellow card) 65'; Collins 86'	Stadium: Meadow Lane; Attendance: 5,023; Referee: Nick Kinseley

4 February 2017 29	Accrington Stanley	2–0	Notts County	Accrington
15:00 GMT	Rodgers 45'; Husin 80'	Report	Ameobi (yellow card) 71'	Stadium: Crown Ground; Attendance: Darren Drysdale; Referee: 1,731

11 February 2017 30	Notts County	2–1	Cheltenham Town	Nottingham
15:00 GMT	Yeates (yellow card) 15'; Stead 24'; Duffy 33'; O'Connor (yellow card) 61'	Report	Onariase 87' (yellow card) 90+5'	Stadium: Meadow Lane; Attendance: 7,910; Referee: Michael Salisbury

14 February 2017 31	Notts County	2–2	Exeter City	Nottingham
19:45 GMT	Milsom (yellow card) 12'; Smith (yellow card) 50'; Hewitt (yellow card) 54'; Grant (yellow card) 90+1' (goal) 90+3'; Duffy 90+2'	Report	Wheeler 33'; Moore-Taylor (yellow card) 75'; Taylor (yellow card) 77' (yellow-red card) 87'; Harley 88'; McAlinden (yellow card) 90+2'	Stadium: Meadow Lane; Attendance: 4,047; Referee: Seb Stockbridge

18 February 2017 32	Leyton Orient	2–3	Notts County	Leyton, London
15:00 GMT	Semedo (yellow card) 31'; McCallum 49'; Koroma (yellow card) 63'; Mézague 81'	Report	Grant 35'; Duffy (yellow card) 38'; Stead 48', 84'; Milsom (yellow card) 62'; O'Connor (yellow card) 75'; Thompson (yellow card) 90+1'	Stadium: Matchroom Stadium; Attendance: 5,585; Referee: Brett Huxtable

25 February 2017 33	Notts County	0–0	Yeovil Town	Nottingham
15:00 GMT	Clackstone (yellow card) 87'	Report	Dawson (yellow card) 45'	Stadium: Meadow Lane; Attendance: 7,141; Referee: Eddie Ilderton

28 February 2017 34	Plymouth Argyle	0–1	Notts County	Plymouth
19:45 GMT	Bradley (yellow card) 67'; Slew (yellow card) 89'	Report	Grant 21'; Forte (yellow card) 32'; O'Connor (yellow card) 68'; Milsom (yellow card) 90+2'	Stadium: Home Park; Attendance: 7,566; Referee: Gavin Ward

4 March 2017 35	Stevenage	3–0	Notts County	Stevenage
15:00 GMT	Godden 3', 62'; King 60'	Report	Clackstone (yellow card) 59'	Stadium: Broadhall Way; Attendance: 3,248; Referee: David Webb

11 March 2017 36	Notts County	2–1	Hartlepool United	Nottingham
15:00 GMT	Ameobi 47'; Grant 70'	Report	Hawkins (yellow card) 28'; Hollis 78' (o.g.); Harrison (yellow card) 81'	Stadium: Meadow Lane; Attendance: 8,653; Referee: Darren Deadman

14 March 2017 37	Doncaster Rovers	3–1	Notts County	Doncaster
GMT	Coppinger 43'; Baudry 47'; Lawlor (yellow card) 66'; May (yellow card) 78'; Williams 90+5'	Report	Duffy 20'; Bola (yellow card) 71'; Tootle (yellow card) 90+1'	Stadium: Keepmoat Stadium; Attendance: 5,760; Referee: Nigel Miller

19 March 2017 38	Notts County	1–0	Barnet	Nottingham
15:00 GMT	Yeates (red card) 11'; Tootle 49'; Ameobi (yellow card) 81'; Bola (yellow card) 90+3'	Report	Akinde (yellow card) 20'	Stadium: Meadow Lane; Attendance: 7,178; Referee: Keith Stroud

25 March 2017 39	Wycombe Wanderers	0–1	Notts County	High Wycombe
15:00 GMT	Weston (yellow card) 61'	Report	Ameobi 27'; O'Connor (yellow card) 53'; Dickinson (yellow card) 90+2'	Stadium: Adams Park; Attendance: 4,362; Referee: Ross Joyce

1 April 2017 40	Notts County	3–1	Colchester United	Nottingham
15:00 GMT	Hollis 8'; Milsom (yellow card) 33'; Ameobi 34', 73'	Report	Porter 21'; Elokobi (yellow card) 31'	Stadium: Meadow Lane; Attendance: 6,104; Referee: Darren Handley

8 April 2017 41	Carlisle United	1–2	Notts County	Carlisle
15:00 BST	Ibehre 57'	Report	Stead 85'; Tootle 89'	Stadium: Brunton Park; Attendance: 4,361; Referee: Seb Stockbridge

14 April 2017 42	Crewe Alexandra	2–2	Notts County	Crewe
15:00 BST	Dagnall 38'; Jones 66'	Report	Campbell 9'; O'Connor 51'; Hewitt (yellow card) 86'; Ameobi (yellow card) 90'	Stadium: Gresty Road; Attendance: 5,016; Referee: Gavin Ward

17 April 2017 43	Notts County	1–3	Portsmouth	Nottingham
15:00 BST	O'Connor (yellow card) 30'; Grant 51'; Bola (yellow card) 90+1'	Report	Evans 14' (pen.); Linganzi (yellow card) 60'; Lowe 77', 90'; Chaplin (yellow card) 78'; Naismith (yellow card) 90+3'	Stadium: Meadow Lane; Attendance: 12,184; Referee: Graham Salisbury

22 April 2017 44	Luton Town	2–1	Notts County	Luton
15:00 BST	Palmer 16'; Hylton (yellow card) 26' (yellow-red card) 90+1'; Ruddock Mpanzu 45+3' (yellow card) 90+5'	Report	Hewitt 6'; Dickinson (yellow card) 49'; Hollis (yellow card) 76'; Campbell (yellow card) 90'	Stadium: Kenilworth Road; Attendance: 7,791; Referee: David Webb

29 April 2017 45	Notts County	1–0	Blackpool	Nottingham
15:00 BST	Duffy 34'; Milsom (yellow card) 74'	Report		Stadium: Meadow Lane; Attendance: 7,108; Referee: Dean Whitestone

6 May 2017 46	Newport County	2–1	Notts County	Newport
17:30 BST	Demetriou 32' (pen.); Labadie (yellow card) 73'; O'Brien 89'	Report	Grant 62'; Smith (yellow card) 77'	Stadium: Rodney Parade; Referee: Nigel Miller

=== FA Cup ===
6 November 2016 First round	Boreham Wood	2–2	Notts County	Borehamwood
14:00 GMT	Ferrier 31'; Balanta 50' (yellow card) 51'; Ricketts (yellow card) 65'; Jeffrey (yellow card) 77'; Smith (yellow card) 90+1'	Report	Campbell 60', 83'; Laing (yellow card) 78'; Dickinson (yellow card) 86'; Tootle (yellow card) 90+4'	Stadium: Meadow Park; Attendance: 1,201; Referee: Mark Heywood

15 November 2016 First round replay	Notts County	2–0	Boreham Wood	Nottingham
19:45 GMT	Forte 24'; Collins 90+5'	Report		Stadium: Meadow Lane Stadium; Attendance: 1,762; Referee: Richard Clark

4 December 2016 Second round	Notts County	2–2	Peterborough United	Nottingham
14:00 GMT	O'Connor (yellow card) 16'; Oliver (yellow card) 41'; Campbell 42' (yellow card) 90+5'; Laing (yellow card) 88' (goal) 90+4'	Report	Lopes 3'; Edwards 15'; Angol (red card) 45+3'; McGee (yellow card) 64'	Stadium: Meadow Lane Stadium; Attendance: 3,940; Referee: Ben Toner

20 December 2016 Second round replay	Peterborough United	2–0	Notts County	Peterborough
19:45 GMT	Edwards 2'; Taylor 8'	Report	Stead (penalty missed) 37'	Stadium: London Road Stadium; Attendance: 7,796; Referee: Darren England

=== EFL Cup ===
9 August 2016 First round	Scunthorpe United	2–0 (a.e.t.)	Notts County	Scunthorpe
19:45 BST	van Veen 100', 115'	Report		Stadium: Glanford Park; Attendance: 2,158; Referee: Scott Duncan

=== EFL Trophy ===
Pos	Div	Team	Pld	W	PW	PL	L	GF	GA	GD	Pts	Qualification
1	L1	Rochdale	3	2	1	0	0	5	3	+2	8	Advance to Round 2
2	ACA	Sunderland U21	3	2	0	1	0	4	2	+2	7	Advance to Round 2
3	L2	Notts County	3	1	0	0	2	4	5	−1	3	
4	L2	Hartlepool United	3	0	0	0	3	2	5	−3	0	

Source: Sky Sports

31 August 2016 Group stage 1	Notts County	2–1	Hartlepool United	Meadow Lane, Nottingham
19:45	Snijders 20'; Burke 36' (pen.)	Report	Oates 29'	Attendance: 1,095; Referee: Darren England

4 October 2016 Group stage 2	Rochdale	2–1	Notts County	Rochdale
19:45 BST	Odelusi (yellow card) 60' (goal) 61'; Davies 69'	Report	Forte 25'; Aborah (yellow card) 58'	Stadium: Crown Oil Arena; Attendance: 1,147; Referee: Jeremy Simpson

9 November 2016 Group stage 3	Sunderland U23	2–1	Notts County	Sunderland
19:30 GMT	Maja 84'; Hollis 90' (o.g.)	Report	Campbell 49'; Smith (yellow card) 75'	Stadium: Stadium of Light; Referee: Ross Joyce
