= Adam Campbell (footballer, born 1995) =

English footballer (born 1995)

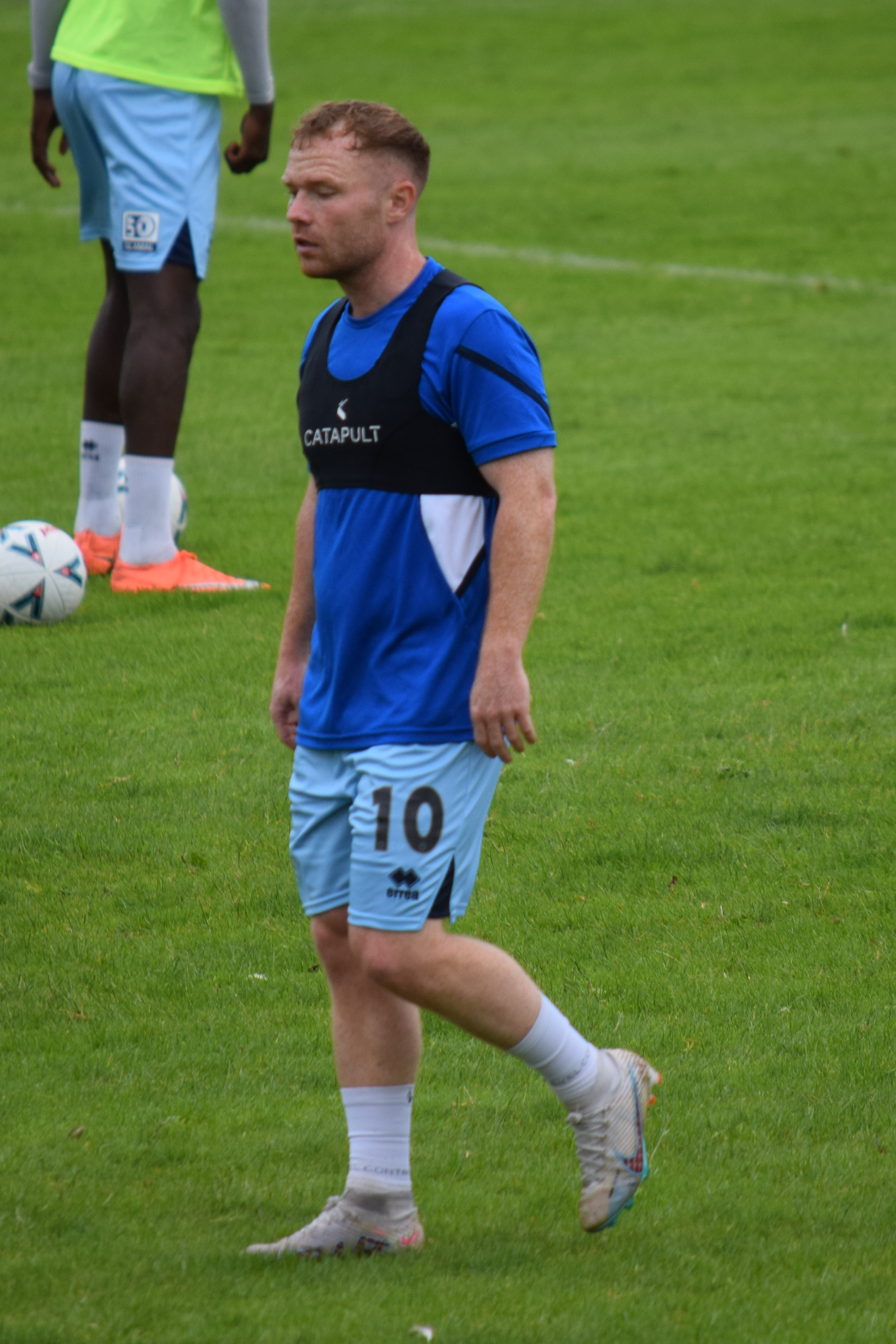
- Campbell warming up for Hartlepool United in 2024

Personal information
- Full name: Adam Campbell
- Date of birth: 1 January 1995 (age 31)
- Place of birth: North Shields, England
- Height: 5 ft 7 in (1.70 m)
- Positions: Striker; winger

Team information
- Current team: South Shields
- Number: 27

Youth career
- Wallsend Boys Club
- 2005–2012: Newcastle United

Senior career*
Years	Team	Apps	(Gls)
2012–2015	Newcastle United	3	(0)
2013	→ Carlisle United (loan)	1	(0)
2014	→ St Mirren (loan)	11	(2)
2014	→ Fleetwood Town (loan)	2	(0)
2014	→ Hartlepool United (loan)	2	(0)
2015	→ Gateshead (loan)	8	(3)
2015–2017	Notts County	73	(8)
2017–2019	Morecambe	25	(1)
2018–2019	→ Carlisle United (loan)	13	(0)
2019–2021	Darlington	43	(19)
2021–2023	Gateshead	83	(25)
2023–2024	Crawley Town	42	(7)
2024–2026	Hartlepool United	70	(7)
2026–	South Shields	15	(4)

International career
2011	England U16	1	(0)
2012	England U17	3	(1)
2013	England U19	5	(0)
- * Club domestic league appearances and goals as of 18:01, 7 November 2026 (UTC)

Adam Campbell (born 1 January 1995) is an English professional footballer who plays as a striker for National League North club South Shields.

He played in the Premier League for Newcastle United, in the Scottish Premiership for St Mirren, in the Football League for Carlisle United, Fleetwood Town, Hartlepool United, Notts County and Morecambe, and in the National League North for Darlington. He represented England at under-16, under-17 and under-19 levels.

== Club career ==
=== Newcastle United ===
Campbell was born in North Shields and attended St Bernadette's R.C Primary School in Wallsend as well as St Thomas More R.C High School in North Shields from 2006 to 2011. He is a product of Wallsend Boys Club.

Campbell won the Most Valuable Player award at the 2010 Nike Cup at Old Trafford. In addition, Campbell was named Premier Player of the Tournament at the 2012 Milk Cup.

He made his competitive debut against Atromitos in the UEFA Europa League on 23 August 2012, aged 17 years and 236 days, becoming the youngest player to play for Newcastle in European competition. Campbell made his Premier League debut for Newcastle United on 10 March 2013, taking up a position on the left wing. He came off the bench late in the second half in a 2–1 win against Stoke City, making a pass to Sylvain Marveaux who assisted Papiss Cissé for the winner.

==== Loan spells ====
Campbell scored both Newcastle goals in a 2–1 win in a pre-season friendly against Gateshead in August 2013. On 15 August, Campbell joined Carlisle United on a one-month loan. He made his debut two days later, coming on at half-time in a 4–0 loss to Coventry City. Later that month, he was recalled from his loan. Campbell joined Scottish Premiership club St Mirren on 1 January 2014 on loan until the end of the season. He scored on his debut the next day in a 2–1 defeat away to Kilmarnock, and ended his loan spell with 12 appearances and two goals. On 7 August 2014, Campbell joined League One club Fleetwood Town on a one-month loan. He failed to score in four appearances for the club. Campbell was loaned to League Two club Hartlepool United for a month on 21 November, and made two league appearances without scoring. On 16 January 2015, Campbell and Callum Roberts signed for Gateshead on a 28-day youth loan. Two days later, he scored both goals on his debut in a 2–0 win over Nuneaton Town.

=== Notts County ===
In July 2015 Campbell signed for Notts County.

=== Morecambe ===
In June 2017 Campbell signed for Morecambe. He scored his first goal for the club in a 2–1 loss at Barnet on 16 December 2017. On 3 August 2018, Campbell joined fellow League Two club Carlisle United on loan until January.

He was released by Morecambe at the end of the 2018–19 season.

=== Non-league football ===
Following his release from Morecambe, Campbell signed for National League North club Darlington on 3 July 2019, and finished his first season as top scorer with 16 goals (15 in league competition). He played and scored regularly in 2020–21 before the National League North was abandoned because of COVID-19 pandemic-related issues, and left the club at the end of that season.

Campbell rejoined Gateshead on 5 May 2021. Campbell was a member of the Gateshead side that won the National League North title in the 2021–22 scoring 12 goals in 40 league games. In the following season, Campbell played in the 2023 FA Trophy final defeat to FC Halifax Town at Wembley Stadium.

=== Crawley Town ===
On 5 August 2023, Campbell returned to the EFL, signing for League Two Crawley Town for an undisclosed fee. He was a member of Crawley's promotion-winning side, making an appearance in the play-off final win against Crewe Alexandra at Wembley.

Following promotion at the end of the 2023–24 season, Campbell was offered a new contract by the club. On 24 June 2024, the club confirmed that Campbell would depart the club upon the expiration of his existing deal.

=== Hartlepool United ===
On 24 June 2024, Campbell agreed to join National League side Hartlepool United. He made his first appearance in his second Hartlepool United spell in a 1–0 victory against Yeovil Town in the opening match of the 2024–25 season. On 12 October, he scored his first Hartlepool goal in his 12th match, a 1–1 draw with Brackley Town in an FA Cup fourth qualifying round match. Speaking after the match, Campbell said "I'd be lying if I said it hadn't been probably the most frustrating four months that I've had in seven or eight years of professional football" citing limited game time.

In the 2025–26 season, Campbell scored five times in 32 appearances and contributed four assists. On 6 May 2026 the club announced he was being released. Following his departure from the club, Campbell described his second spell with Hartlepool as probably "the toughest two years of my career".

=== South Shields ===
On 9 July 2026, Campbell signed for South Shields.

== International career ==
Campbell earned his only under-16 cap against Northern Ireland in the Victory Shield on 23 March 2011. In February 2012, he represented the under-17 team at the Algarve Tournament in Portugal, scoring once in three appearances. He made his under-19 debut as a 55th-minute substitute in a friendly match against Turkey on 21 March 2013.

== Career statistics ==
As of 7 November 2026

Appearances and goals by club, season and competition
Club	Season	League			National cup (Note: Includes FA Cup, Scottish Cup)		League cup (Note: Includes Football League Cup/EFL Cup, Scottish League Cup)		Other		Total	
Club	Season	Division	Apps	Goals	Apps	Goals	Apps	Goals	Apps	Goals	Apps	Goals
Newcastle United	2012–13	Premier League	3	0	0	0	0	0	2 (Note: Appearances in UEFA Europa League)	0	5	0
Newcastle United	2013–14	Premier League	0	0	0	0	0	0	0	0	0	0
Newcastle United	2014–15	Premier League	0	0	0	0	0	0	0	0	0	0
Newcastle United	Total		3	0	0	0	0	0	2	0	5	0
Carlisle United (loan)	2013–14	League One	1	0	0	0	0	0	—		1	0
St Mirren (loan)	2013–14	Scottish Premiership	11	2	1	0	0	0	—		12	2
Fleetwood Town (loan)	2014–15	League One	2	0	0	0	1	0	1 (Note: Appearance(s) in Football League Trophy)	0	4	0
Hartlepool United (loan)	2014–15	League Two	2	0	0	0	0	0	0	0	2	0
Gateshead (loan)	2014–15	Conference Premier	8	3	0	0	0	0	2 (Note: Appearance(s) in FA Trophy)	1	10	4
Notts County	2015–16	League Two	44	4	1	0	1	0	2	0	48	4
Notts County	2016–17	League Two	29	4	4	3	1	0	3 (Note: Appearance(s) in EFL Trophy)	1	37	8
Notts County	Total		73	8	5	3	2	0	5	1	85	12
Morecambe	2017–18	League Two	25	1	2	0	1	0	3	0	31	1
Morecambe	2018–19	League Two	0	0	—		—		—		0	0
Morecambe	Total		25	1	2	0	1	0	3	0	31	1
Carlisle United (loan)	2018–19	League Two	13	0	2	0	1	0	1	0	17	0
Darlington	2019–20	National League North	33	15	5	1	—		4	0	42	16
Darlington	2020–21	National League North	10	4	4	2	—		5	0	19	6
Darlington	Total		43	19	9	3	—		9	0	61	22
Gateshead	2021–22	National League North	40	12	7	2	—		1	0	48	14
Gateshead	2022–23	National League	43	13	3	2	—		6	1	52	16
Gateshead	Total		83	25	10	4	—		7	1	100	30
Crawley Town	2023–24	League Two	42	7	1	0	0	0	5 (Note: Two appearances in EFL Trophy, three appearances in EFL League Two play-offs)	0	48	7
Hartlepool United	2024–25	National League	38	2	2	1	0	0	0	0	40	3
Hartlepool United	2025–26	National League	32	5	1	0	0	0	1	0	34	5
Hartlepool United	Total		70	7	3	1	0	0	1	0	74	8
South Shields	2026–27	National League North	15	4	3	1	0	0	0	0	18	5
Career total			391	76	36	12	5	0	36	3	468	91

== Honours ==
Gateshead

- National League North: 2021–22
- FA Trophy runner-up: 2022–23

Crawley Town

- EFL League Two play-offs: 2024
