= Jordan Richards (footballer, born 1997) =

English footballer

Personal information
- Date of birth: 6 July 1997 (age 29)
- Place of birth: Nottingham, England
- Height: 1.60 m (5 ft 3 in)
- Positions: Midfielder; defender

Team information
- Current team: Scunthorpe United
- Number: 19

Senior career*
Years	Team	Apps	(Gls)
2015–2017	Notts County	12	(0)
2015	→ Boston United (loan)	19	(1)
2016	→ Sligo Rovers (loan)	15	(2)
2017–2018	Gainsborough Trinity	33	(0)
2018–2021	King's Lynn Town	56	(2)
2021–2023	Brackley Town	56	(1)
2023–2026	Boston United	128	(4)
2026–	Scunthorpe United	0	(0)
- * Club domestic league appearances and goals as of 10:40, 31 July 2026 (UTC)

Jordan Richards (born 6 July 1997) is an English footballer, who plays as a midfielder for side Scunthorpe United.

== Playing career ==
=== Notts County ===
Richards began his career with Notts County where his father, Pedro, played over 400 games. Richards gained experience out on loan at Boston United and Irish club Sligo Rovers. During the 2016–17 season, Richards become increasingly involved with the first team squad with County, making 16 appearances in all competitions by the end of the season.

=== Gainsborough Trinity ===
In July 2017, Richards signed for National League North side Gainsborough Trinity, despite receiving offers from football league clubs.

=== King's Lynn Town ===
On 3 August 2018, Richards signed for Southern League Premier Central side King's Lynn Town.

=== Boston United ===
On 14 June 2023 Richards re-signed for Boston United on a permanent deal.

== Personal life ==
Richards is the son of former Notts County player Pedro Richards. He is also the cousin of Premier League winner Wes Morgan.

== Career statistics ==
As of match played 28 April 2018

Appearances and goals by club, season and competition
Club	Season	League			FA Cup		League Cup		Other		Total	
Club	Season	Division	Apps	Goals	Apps	Goals	Apps	Goals	Apps	Goals	Apps	Goals
Boston (loan)	2015–16	National League North	19	1	0	0	—		0	0	19	1
Sligo (loan)	2016	League of Ireland	15	2	0	0	0	0	0	0	15	2
Notts County	2016–17	League Two	12	0	2	0	0	0	2 (Note: Appearances in EFL Trophy)	0	16	0
Gainsborough Trinity	2017–18	National League North	33	0	2	0	—		0	0	35	0
Career totals			79	3	4	0	0	0	2	0	85	3

== Honours ==
Boston United

- National League North play-offs: 2024
