= 2017–18 Northern Premier League =

The 2017–18 season was the 50th season of the Northern Premier League Premier Division, and the eleventh and last season of the Division One North and South. The league sponsors for 2017–18 were Evo-Stik.

== Premier Division ==
Northern Premier League Premier Division
- Season: 2017–18
- Champions: Altrincham
- Promoted: Altrincham; Ashton United
- Relegated: Sutton Coldfield Town

=== Team changes ===
The following 6 clubs left the Premier Division before the season -

- Blyth Spartans – promoted to National League North
- Corby Town – relegated to NPL Division One South
- Frickley Athletic – relegated to NPL Division One South
- Ilkeston – relegated to NPL Division One South, and were subsequently wound up in the high court. A New Ilkeston Town Replaced in Midland League Division One.
- Skelmersdale United – relegated to NPL Division One North
- Spennymoor Town – promoted to National League North

The following 6 clubs joined the Premier Division before the season -

- Altrincham – relegated from National League North
- Farsley Celtic – promoted from NPL Division One North
- Lancaster City – promoted from NPL Division One North
- Shaw Lane – promoted from NPL Division One South
- Stalybridge Celtic – relegated from National League North
- Witton Albion – promoted from NPL Division One South

=== League table ===
Pos	Team	Pld	W	D	L	GF	GA	GD	Pts	Promotion, qualification or relegation
1	Altrincham (C, P)	46	28	11	7	101	42	+59	95	Promoted to the National League North
2	Ashton United (O, P)	46	23	13	10	85	59	+26	82	Qualified for the Premier Division play-offs, then promoted to the National League North (Note: Four teams played for one spot and promotion to the National League North.)
3	Warrington Town	46	23	13	10	72	49	+23	82	Qualified for the Premier Division play-offs
4	Grantham Town	46	24	9	13	90	55	+35	81	Qualified for the Premier Division play-offs
5	Farsley Celtic	46	23	11	12	87	69	+18	80	Qualified for the Premier Division play-offs
6	Shaw Lane	46	25	7	14	79	62	+17	79 (Note: Shaw Lane were deducted three points for playing an ineligible player.)	Club folded at the end of the season
7	Witton Albion	46	19	13	14	83	63	+20	70	
8	Buxton	46	17	13	16	71	66	+5	64	
9	Barwell	46	17	13	16	65	67	−2	64	Transferred to the Southern League Premier Division Central
10	Stourbridge	46	16	14	16	67	56	+11	62	Transferred to the Southern League Premier Division Central
11	Workington	46	18	8	20	72	69	+3	62	
12	Mickleover Sports	46	16	13	17	68	60	+8	61	
13	Stafford Rangers	46	16	13	17	54	58	−4	61	
14	Matlock Town	46	18	6	22	69	75	−6	60	
15	Nantwich Town	46	16	9	21	62	72	−10	57	
16	Hednesford Town	46	15	12	19	60	79	−19	57	
17	Lancaster City	46	14	13	19	66	72	−6	55	
18	Rushall Olympic	46	19	9	18	73	79	−6	54 (Note: Rushall Olympic were deducted twelve points for playing an ineligible player.)	Transferred to the Southern League Premier Division Central
19	Marine	46	14	11	21	67	78	−11	53	
20	Coalville Town	46	15	7	24	70	92	−22	52	Transferred to the Southern League Premier Division Central
21	Whitby Town	46	12	14	20	60	82	−22	50	
22	Stalybridge Celtic	46	14	6	26	57	90	−33	48	
23	Halesowen Town	46	13	10	23	48	76	−28	45 (Note: Halesowen Town were deducted four points for playing an ineligible player.)	Transferred to the Southern League Premier Division Central
24	Sutton Coldfield Town (R)	46	10	6	30	52	108	−56	35 (Note: Sutton Coldfield Town were deducted one point for playing an ineligible player.)	Relegated to the Southern League Division One Central

Updated to match(es) played on 28 April 2018. Source: NPL official site
Rules for classification: 1) Points; 2) Goal difference; 3) Number of goals scored; 4) Number of matches won; 5) Head-to-head results
(C) Champions; (O) Play-off winners; (P) Promoted; (R) Relegated

=== Top scorers ===
Up to games played 28 April 2018.

Rank	Player	Club	Goals
1	(England) Liam Hardy	Buxton	34
2	(England) Lee Shaw	Grantham Town	29
3	(England) Jordan Hulme	Altrincham	26
4	(England) Steven Tames	Witton Albion	25
5	(England) Rob Hopley	Witton Albion	21
6	(England) James Walshaw	Farsley Celtic	20
7	(England) Andy Dales	Mickleover Sports	19
7	(England) Nathan Watson	Coalville Town	19
7	(England) Shaun Harrad	Matlock Town	19
10	(England) Joshua Hancock	Altrincham	18
10	(England) Matthew Stenson	Barwell	18
10	(England) Daniel Waldron	Rushall Olympic	18

=== Results ===
Home \ Away	ALT	ASH	BAR	BUX	COA	FAR	GRN	HAL	HED	LNC	MAR	MAT	MIC	NAN	RSO	SHL	STA	STL	STB	SUT	WAR	WTB	WTN	WRK
Altrincham		3–2	4–0	1–1	4–2	6–0	1–0	3–0	3–0	4–0	1–1	3–0	1–1	5–1	4–0	5–1	0–3	1–2	4–1	2–1	1–1	1–0	3–4	2–3
Ashton United	3–3		1–1	1–4	1–2	1–1	2–1	3–0	1–2	2–1	3–0	3–0	1–1	2–1	2–1	3–3	1–0	1–2	1–0	2–0	2–0	4–0	2–1	0–1
Barwell	1–3	1–1		2–1	2–1	3–4	1–1	1–1	1–1	1–0	0–4	2–1	2–1	0–2	4–4	1–0	1–2	1–0	1–1	2–1	0–1	1–0	0–1	1–0
Buxton	0–0	1–0	1–1		2–2	3–3	0–3	2–1	2–2	1–2	2–1	2–3	0–2	3–0	1–2	0–2	1–1	2–2	1–1	0–1	2–1	0–2	2–0	4–2
Coalville Town	0–3	1–2	0–3	1–5		2–3	1–3	1–0	5–2	1–4	2–3	2–1	2–0	0–3	2–5	1–3	0–0	4–0	0–1	4–2	0–3	0–1	2–1	3–0
Farsley Celtic	0–1	3–3	1–2	3–0	3–1		3–0	3–1	1–3	0–0	3–0	1–2	0–3	2–0	1–0	4–2	1–0	5–4	1–4	0–1	0–2	4–0	1–1	3–3
Grantham Town	0–2	1–1	4–1	0–1	0–1	2–2		1–2	1–1	3–2	5–0	2–1	0–3	0–0	7–1	3–1	1–2	0–0	4–2	6–1	0–0	2–0	1–1	3–2
Halesowen Town	0–2	1–1	1–0	1–3	2–3	1–2	1–3		2–1	4–3	1–1	3–2	0–0	0–1	2–0	0–0	2–0	1–1	1–0	0–2	1–1	3–1	1–3	1–5
Hednesford Town	0–3	1–1	2–3	1–2	1–1	2–1	1–3	2–0		1–1	3–2	2–0	1–3	1–0	1–1	1–3	2–1	2–1	1–1	3–0	0–2	0–0	1–0	1–1
Lancaster City	1–2	0–3	1–1	1–1	4–2	1–1	3–1	2–0	0–1		3–0	1–2	1–1	1–2	0–2	2–0	1–1	1–0	0–0	2–1	2–2	4–1	4–0	2–2
Marine	0–3	3–4	0–1	2–3	0–1	1–2	1–1	1–0	2–0	3–0		1–2	1–3	1–1	2–2	1–2	1–1	3–1	0–4	5–0	0–4	0–3	2–2	2–0
Matlock Town	1–0	1–2	0–2	3–3	3–1	1–2	2–3	2–0	3–2	4–3	2–2		1–0	0–3	2–1	0–1	2–0	2–0	0–0	5–0	1–3	1–2	2–3	2–0
Mickleover Sports	1–2	2–5	3–3	2–2	2–2	2–2	1–0	0–0	5–0	0–1	1–2	2–0		1–2	1–1	1–3	0–2	1–0	1–2	2–0	1–3	2–1	1–1	1–0
Nantwich Town	1–1	2–3	2–2	1–3	1–3	1–1	3–1	1–3	1–5	3–0	1–1	0–2	1–2		1–2	2–3	0–3	2–3	2–0	0–0	2–1	1–0	3–2	2–0
Rushall Olympic	2–0	4–2	1–1	2–0	1–1	1–1	0–2	3–1	1–2	3–0	0–2	1–0	1–0	1–4		1–3	1–2	1–0	1–2	5–1	1–2	3–3	0–0	1–0
Shaw Lane	1–2	0–0	3–2	2–0	2–0	1–0	0–2	3–2	3–1	0–0	1–3	2–1	1–2	0–2	2–0		5–2	2–0	3–1	3–1	5–0	0–0	1–1	3–2
Stafford Rangers	0–2	1–0	1–0	1–4	4–1	0–2	1–2	0–0	0–1	2–2	1–4	2–0	1–1	3–0	0–4	1–2		2–0	1–0	4–1	0–0	2–2	0–4	1–2
Stalybridge Celtic	0–0	2–2	4–2	0–1	0–3	1–4	1–3	1–0	2–2	5–2	0–2	4–1	0–5	1–0	1–2	0–1	2–0		3–1	1–1	2–0	3–1	0–5	1–3
Stourbridge	1–1	2–3	2–1	2–1	2–1	1–2	0–2	1–2	2–0	0–0	0–2	1–1	1–1	1–1	5–0	1–1	0–0	4–1		2–1	2–1	1–1	0–0	2–3
Sutton Coldfield Town	0–4	0–2	0–6	2–1	1–1	0–1	1–2	0–1	4–1	0–2	3–1	3–3	2–1	1–3	3–4	3–1	2–3	2–0	0–4		0–2	1–1	2–6	4–1
Warrington Town	0–0	0–1	2–0	1–0	1–3	4–2	2–1	1–1	4–1	5–1	0–0	2–0	3–1	0–0	2–0	2–1	1–0	0–1	1–5	2–1		2–1	2–2	1–1
Whitby Town	1–1	3–2	1–0	1–1	2–2	0–2	1–5	5–0	2–2	0–5	3–2	0–3	3–2	2–1	2–3	0–3	0–0	4–1	1–3	2–2	2–2		1–2	1–1
Witton Albion	0–2	1–1	2–2	1–0	5–2	1–4	2–3	2–3	3–0	2–0	1–1	3–3	0–2	4–1	1–2	4–0	1–2	4–1	1–0	1–0	1–2	1–0		1–0
Workington	5–2	1–2	0–2	1–2	1–0	1–2	0–2	3–1	1–0	2–0	2–1	0–1	3–0	2–1	4–1	2–0	0–0	3–4	2–1	4–0	1–1	1–3	1–1	

Updated to match(es) played on 28 April 2018. Source:
Legend: Blue = home team win; Yellow = draw; Red = away team win.

=== Play-offs ===
Semi-finals
2	Ashton United	2
5	Farsley Celtic	1
3	Warrington Town	0
4	Grantham Town	3

Final
2	Ashton United	2
4	Grantham Town	0

Semi-finals

1 May 2018	Ashton United	2–1	Farsley Celtic	Hurst Cross, Ashton-under-Lyne
19:45 (UTC+01:00)		Report		Attendance: 604

1 May 2018	Warrington Town	0–3	Grantham Town	Cantilever Park, Warrington
19:45 (UTC+01:00)		Report		Attendance: 737

Final

5 May 2018	Ashton United	2–0	Grantham Town	Hurst Cross, Ashton-under-Lyne
15:00 (UTC+01:00)		Report		Attendance: 931

=== Stadia and locations ===
Locations of the 2017–18 Premier Division clubs
Locations of Northern Premier League 2017–18 Premier Division teams in Greater Manchester

Club	Ground	Capacity
Altrincham	Moss Lane	6,085
Ashton United	Hurst Cross	4,500
Barwell	Kirkby Road	2,500
Buxton	The Silverlands	5,200
Coalville Town	Owen Street Sports Ground	2,000
Farsley Celtic	Throstle Nest	3,900
Grantham Town	South Kesteven Sports Stadium	7,500
Halesowen Town	The Grove	5,000
Hednesford Town	Keys Park	6,500
Lancaster City	Giant Axe	3,500
Marine	Rossett Park	3,185
Matlock Town	Causeway Lane	2,214
Mickleover Sports	Station Road	1,500
Nantwich Town	The Weaver Stadium	3,500
Rushall Olympic	Dales Lane	1,400
Shaw Lane	Sheerien Park	2,000
Stafford Rangers	Marston Road	4,000
Stalybridge Celtic	Bower Fold	6,500
Stourbridge	War Memorial Athletic Ground	2,014
Sutton Coldfield Town	Central Ground	2,000
Warrington Town	Cantilever Park	3,500
Whitby Town	Turnbull Ground	3,500
Witton Albion	Wincham Park	4,813
Workington	Borough Park	3,101

== Division One North ==
Northern Premier League Division One North
- Season: 2017–18
- Champions: South Shields
- Promoted: South Shields; Scarborough Athletic; Hyde United; Bamber Bridge
- Relegated: Goole
- Matches: 462
- Goals: 1,489 (3.22 per match)
- Top goalscorer: Michael Coulson, 33
- Biggest home win: Scarborough Athletic 7–0 Kendal Town (13 January 2018)
- Biggest away win: Radcliffe Borough 0-7 Droylsden (23 December 2017)
- Highest scoring: Mossley 5-4 Kendal Town (23 December 2017); Ossett Town 7-2 Goole (28 April 2018)
- Highest attendance: 2,022; Scarborough Athletic 2-0 Ossett Albion (28 April 2018)
- Lowest attendance: 78; Kendal Town 4-2 (Trafford (12 September 2017)

=== Team changes ===
The following 3 clubs left Division One North before the season -

- Burscough – relegated to North West Counties League Premier Division
- Farsley Celtic – promoted to NPL Premier Division
- Lancaster City – promoted to NPL Premier Division

The following 3 clubs joined Division One North before the season -

- Atherton Collieries – promoted from North West Counties League Premier Division
- Skelmersdale United – relegated from NPL Premier Division
- South Shields – promoted from Northern League Division One

=== League table ===
Pos	Team	Pld	W	D	L	GF	GA	GD	Pts	Promotion, qualification or relegation
1	South Shields (C, P)	42	32	7	3	112	37	+75	103	Promoted to the NPL Premier Division
2	Scarborough Athletic (P)	42	30	5	7	101	42	+59	95	Promoted to the NPL Premier Division
3	Hyde United (P)	42	27	11	4	90	35	+55	92 (Note: Hyde United were promoted as the 3rd placed team with the highest PPG at Level 8.)	Promoted to the NPL Premier Division
4	Bamber Bridge (O, P)	42	20	14	8	81	54	+27	74	Qualified for the NPL Division One North play-offs, then promoted to the NPL Premier Division (Note: Four teams played for one spot and promotion to Level 7.)
5	Prescot Cables	42	22	6	14	78	55	+23	72	Qualified for the NPL Division One North play-offs
6	Trafford	42	17	15	10	61	50	+11	66	Qualified for the NPL Division One North play-offs
7	Tadcaster Albion	42	17	11	14	67	46	+21	62	Qualified for the NPL Division One North play-offs, then transferred to NPL Division One East
8	Colne	42	18	8	16	68	61	+7	62	
9	Colwyn Bay	42	17	10	15	77	58	+19	61	
10	Atherton Collieries	42	15	13	14	50	55	−5	58	
11	Glossop North End	42	15	8	19	66	72	−6	53	
12	Clitheroe	42	15	6	21	69	79	−10	51	
13	Droylsden	42	13	11	18	67	77	−10	50	
14	Ramsbottom United	42	14	6	22	61	70	−9	48	
15	Ossett Albion	42	12	11	19	56	76	−20	47	Merged into Ossett United, then transferred to NPL Division One East
16	Ossett Town	42	14	5	23	55	77	−22	47	Merged into Ossett United, then transferred to NPL Division One East
17	Brighouse Town	42	14	4	24	59	93	−34	46	Transferred to NPL Division One East
18	Kendal Town	42	13	6	23	61	89	−28	45	
19	Mossley	42	11	11	20	57	81	−24	44	
20	Radcliffe Borough	42	12	8	22	51	89	−38	44	Changed Name to Radcliffe
21	Skelmersdale United	42	8	13	21	53	84	−31	37	
22	Goole (R)	42	8	7	27	49	109	−60	31	Relegated to the NCEFL Premier Division

Updated to match(es) played on 11 May 2018. Source: NPL official site
Rules for classification: 1) Points; 2) Goal difference; 3) Number of goals scored; 4) Number of matches won; 5) Head-to-head results
(C) Champions; (O) Play-off winners; (P) Promoted; (R) Relegated

=== Top scorers ===
Up to games played 28 April 2018.

Rank	Player	Club	Goals
1	(England) Michael Coulson	Scarborough Athletic	33
2	(England) Kurt Willoughby	Clitheroe	26
3	(England) Alex Curran	Colne	21
4	(England) Liam Caddick	Droylsden	19
4	(England) James Walshaw	Scarborough Athletic	19
6	(England) Aaron Martin	Brighouse Town	18
7	(England) Astley Mulholland	Colwyn Bay	17
7	(England) Christopher Almond	Prescot Cables	17
7	(England) Alex Newby	Clitheroe	17
10	(England) Thomas Corner	Tadcaster Albion	16
10	(England) Carl Finnigan	South Shields	16
12	(England) Brad Carsley	Bamber Bridge	15

=== Results ===
Home \ Away	ACO	BAM	BRT	CLT	CLN	COL	DRO	GNE	GOO	HYD	KEN	MOS	OSA	OST	PRC	RAD	RAM	SCA	SKU	SSH	TAD	TRA
Atherton Collieries		1–1	4–0	2–5	0–2	3–1	0–5	1–1	3–2	1–1	0–0	3–1	2–0	0–2	1–0	1–1	3–2	2–1	1–1	0–2	0–0	0–1
Bamber Bridge	1–1		3–2	2–1	1–1	2–2	2–2	1–1	6–1	1–1	4–0	2–2	1–0	3–2	1–0	3–0	2–3	0–0	0–0	3–2	3–1	5–0
Brighouse Town	0–3	3–3		2–0	2–1	2–2	2–3	0–2	2–3	1–1	2–3	1–0	4–2	1–3	2–1	0–1	3–2	0–1	1–0	1–5	2–3	0–2
Clitheroe	1–0	0–3	3–2		1–3	1–3	2–0	4–1	1–2	2–0	3–0	1–1	4–1	2–2	1–3	0–2	4–3	0–4	2–2	0–1	0–1	1–1
Colne	0–2	0–3	3–1	0–6		4–0	3–1	5–0	4–0	2–2	2–1	1–1	1–0	1–2	2–1	3–3	1–0	1–3	2–1	1–2	0–0	1–1
Colwyn Bay	1–2	2–2	4–0	5–1	0–0		1–2	5–1	5–0	0–3	2–1	5–0	1–1	1–0	3–0	3–0	2–2	1–2	1–1	4–2	1–1	1–1
Droylsden	1–1	1–1	0–3	0–3	1–2	3–1		2–3	1–1	1–3	0–1	2–0	2–0	2–1	1–3	3–1	1–0	1–3	2–0	1–2	2–2	1–1
Glossop North End	1–2	0–1	5–2	2–0	3–1	1–0	1–1		3–1	0–0	2–1	1–0	2–3	3–3	2–3	2–2	1–3	2–1	5–0	1–3	0–1	1–1
Goole	1–1	1–4	0–3	1–2	2–3	0–1	2–2	0–3		1–4	0–4	5–1	2–2	0–3	1–4	1–1	1–0	1–3	3–3	1–3	2–0	1–0
Hyde United	4–0	2–1	5–1	4–0	1–0	4–3	2–1	2–0	5–0		3–1	5–1	1–0	1–1	2–1	4–1	1–1	3–1	0–0	1–1	4–1	6–1
Kendal Town	0–1	3–2	1–2	1–1	1–2	2–1	3–3	1–0	1–3	0–2		2–5	5–1	1–0	1–3	2–3	2–1	2–2	2–3	1–1	0–1	4–2
Mossley	2–0	1–3	2–1	1–3	1–1	2–0	0–0	0–0	4–2	1–2	5–4		1–4	3–2	2–0	0–0	2–0	1–3	4–4	2–3	0–0	1–1
Ossett Albion	3–1	4–0	0–0	3–0	2–1	0–3	3–3	1–2	1–1	2–0	2–2	1–0		1–2	0–0	2–1	0–2	2–5	3–1	2–2	2–2	1–4
Ossett Town	2–3	1–0	3–4	2–2	3–1	0–2	1–3	2–1	7–2	0–2	0–1	1–0	0–1		0–6	0–1	1–1	1–2	2–0	0–2	0–2	0–3
Prescot Cables	3–1	2–1	1–0	3–2	0–2	3–1	3–1	1–2	2–1	2–2	2–0	2–2	1–1	1–2		0–1	2–1	3–1	2–2	0–0	2–1	2–1
Radcliffe Borough	0–2	1–2	2–3	1–2	3–4	2–1	0–7	0–6	2–0	0–2	1–3	0–1	1–2	3–0	0–4		3–1	1–3	4–1	0–4	3–2	0–0
Ramsbottom United	1–0	0–1	2–1	1–0	0–4	1–2	3–1	4–2	3–0	1–2	3–1	2–4	0–0	0–2	1–0	3–0		1–3	1–1	2–3	2–1	3–1
Scarborough Athletic	1–0	2–3	4–0	4–1	2–0	0–2	2–0	2–1	4–1	0–0	7–0	4–1	2–0	3–1	3–0	5–1	2–1		2–1	1–3	3–0	1–1
Skelmersdale United	0–0	1–3	0–1	1–4	2–0	0–2	2–3	2–0	1–2	0–2	0–2	2–1	3–1	3–0	1–6	3–3	3–2	1–4		0–1	1–3	1–1
South Shields	3–1	1–0	5–0	4–1	2–1	4–1	6–1	3–0	2–0	3–0	5–0	5–1	3–1	5–0	5–2	0–0	4–0	1–3	3–1		0–0	2–2
Tadcaster Albion	0–0	5–0	5–0	2–1	3–2	2–1	4–0	4–0	3–0	0–1	3–1	2–0	7–1	0–1	1–2	1–2	1–1	0–0	1–2	0–2		1–1
Trafford	1–1	1–1	0–2	3–1	1–0	0–0	3–0	3–2	2–1	1–0	4–0	1–0	1–0	4–0	0–2	3–0	2–1	1–2	2–2	1–2	1–0	

Updated to match(es) played on 28 April 2018. Source: EvoStik Results Grid
Legend: Blue = home team win; Yellow = draw; Red = away team win.

=== Play-offs ===
Semi-finals
4	Bamber Bridge	2
7	Tadcaster Albion	1
5	Prescot Cables	3
6	Trafford	0

Final
4	Bamber Bridge	1
5	Prescot Cables	0

Semi-finals

1 May 2018	Bamber Bridge	2–1	Tadcaster Albion	Irongate, Bamber Bridge
19:45		Report		Attendance: 613

1 May 2018	Prescot Cables	3–0	Trafford	Valerie Park, Prescot
19:45		Report		Attendance: 695

Final

5 May 2018	Bamber Bridge	1–0	Prescot Cables	Irongate, Bamber Bridge
15:00 (UTC+01:00)		Report		Attendance: 1,628

=== Stadia and locations ===
Locations of Northern Premier League 2017–18 Division One North teams
Locations of Northern Premier League 2017–18 Division One North teams (Greater Manchester)

Team	Stadium	Capacity
Atherton Collieries	Alder Street	2,500
Bamber Bridge	Irongate	2,264
Brighouse Town	St Giles' Road	1,000
Clitheroe	Shawbridge	2,000
Colne	Holt House	1,800
Colwyn Bay	(Wales) Llanelian Road	2,500
Droylsden	Butcher's Arms Ground	3,000
Glossop North End	The Arthur Goldthorpe Stadium	1,350
Goole	Victoria Pleasure Grounds	3,000
Hyde United	Ewen Fields	4,250
Kendal Town	Parkside Road	2,400
Mossley	Seel Park	4,000
Ossett Albion	Queen's Terrace	3,000
Ossett Town	Ingfield	2,000
Prescot Cables	Valerie Park	3,200
Radcliffe Borough	Stainton Park	3,500
Ramsbottom United	The Harry Williams Riverside	2,000
Scarborough Athletic	Flamingo Land Stadium	2,070
Skelmersdale United	Valerie Park	3,200
South Shields	Mariners Park	3,500
Tadcaster Albion	Ings Lane	1,500
Trafford	Shawe View	2,500

== Division One South ==
Northern Premier League Division One South
- Season: 2017–18
- Champions: Basford United
- Promoted: Basford United; Alvechurch; Bedworth United
- Relegated: Romulus

=== Team changes ===
The following 5 clubs left Division One South before the season -

- Northwich Victoria – relegated to North West Counties League Premier Division
- Rugby Town – relegated to Midland League Premier Division
- Shaw Lane – promoted to NPL Premier Division
- Witton Albion – promoted to NPL Premier Division
- AFC Rushden & Diamonds – transferred to Southern League Division One Central

The following 5 clubs joined Division One South before the season -

- Alvechurch – promoted from the Midland League Premier Division
- Cleethorpes Town – promoted from the Northern Counties East League Premier Division
- Corby Town – relegated from NPL Premier Division
- Frickley Athletic – relegated from NPL Premier Division
- Peterborough Sports – promoted from United Counties League Premier Division

=== League table ===
Pos	Team	Pld	W	D	L	GF	GA	GD	Pts	Promotion, qualification or relegation
1	Basford United (C, P)	42	31	7	4	101	42	+59	100	Promoted to the NPL Premier Division
2	Alvechurch (P)	42	25	10	7	78	49	+29	85	Promoted to Southern League Premier Division Central
3	Frickley Athletic	42	26	7	9	117	61	+56	82 (Note: Frickley Athletic were deducted three points for playing an ineligible player.)	Qualified for the NPL Division One South play-offs (Note: Four teams played for one spot and promotion to Level 7.)
4	Bedworth United (O, P)	42	22	8	12	73	58	+15	74	Qualified for the NPL Division One South play-offs, then promoted to Southern League Premier Division Central
5	Chasetown	42	22	7	13	83	64	+19	73	Qualified for the NPL Division One South play-offs, then transferred to NPL Division One West
6	Stamford	42	19	14	9	66	34	+32	71	Qualified for the NPL Division One South play-offs
7	Leek Town	42	20	8	14	80	50	+30	68	Transferred to NPL Division One West
8	Lincoln United	42	21	5	16	85	81	+4	68	
9	Corby Town	42	18	6	18	74	75	−1	60	Transferred to Southern League Division One Central
10	Cleethorpes Town	42	18	13	11	82	57	+25	55 (Note: Cleethorpes Town were deducted twelve points for playing an ineligible player.)	
11	Stocksbridge Park Steels	42	13	14	15	75	66	+9	53	
12	Peterborough Sports	42	15	6	21	70	78	−8	51	Transferred to Southern League Division One Central
13	Spalding United	42	14	8	20	52	62	−10	50	
14	Loughborough Dynamo	42	13	10	19	61	78	−17	49	
15	Sheffield	42	10	15	17	66	85	−19	45	
16	Belper Town	42	12	9	21	46	90	−44	45	
17	Gresley	42	11	10	21	49	91	−42	43	
18	Kidsgrove Athletic	42	11	9	22	70	90	−20	42	Transferred to NPL Division One West
19	Carlton Town	42	10	11	21	66	76	−10	41	
20	Newcastle Town	42	10	9	23	49	73	−24	39	Transferred to NPL Division One West
21	Market Drayton Town	42	10	9	23	51	97	−46	39	Transferred to NPL Division One West
22	Romulus (R)	42	8	11	23	57	94	−37	35	Relegated to the MFL Premier Division

Updated to match(es) played on 28 April 2018. Source: NPL official site
Rules for classification: 1) Points; 2) Goal difference; 3) Number of goals scored; 4) Number of matches won; 5) Head-to-head results
(C) Champions; (O) Play-off winners; (P) Promoted; (R) Relegated

=== Top scorers ===
Up to games played 28 April 2018.

Rank	Player	Club	Goals
1	(England) Liam Hearn	Basford United	39
2	(Saint Kitts and Nevis) Jacob Hazel	Frickley Athletic	35
3	(England) Joe Lumsden	Stocksbridge Park Steels	28
4	(England) Gavin Allott	Frickley Athletic	25
5	(England) Anthony Malbon	Kidsgrove Athletic	22
5	(England) Timothy Grice	Leek Town	22
7	(British Virgin Islands) Jordan Johnson	Leek Town	17
7	(England) Matthew Melbourne	Gresley	17
7	(England) Jack Langston	Chasetown	17
10	(England) Luke Keen	Bedworth United	16

=== Results ===
Home \ Away	ALV	BAS	BWU	BLP	CAR	CHA	CLE	COR	FRK	GRE	KID	LEE	LIN	LOU	MAR	NEW	PSP	ROM	SHE	SPA	STM	STO
Alvechurch		1–2	0–0	2–4	3–2	2–1	1–0	1–0	2–0	2–1	4–2	3–1	3–2	2–3	2–1	0–0	4–0	2–1	3–2	1–2	1–5	1–0
Basford United	1–1		2–0	1–0	6–2	1–1	2–2	4–0	3–2	1–1	5–0	3–2	3–2	1–0	4–1	5–1	3–0	3–0	4–0	2–1	2–1	3–1
Bedworth United	0–0	1–1		0–2	3–1	2–0	2–1	2–0	3–2	2–0	3–2	2–1	3–0	1–1	2–1	0–0	3–2	3–2	2–0	2–3	1–2	3–1
Belper Town	0–2	0–1	1–1		2–1	1–2	0–7	1–0	0–6	0–2	1–3	1–2	1–1	1–2	1–2	2–1	1–0	2–2	1–2	2–1	0–0	0–3
Carlton Town	1–3	2–3	2–1	4–1		2–4	1–1	1–1	2–2	1–2	0–1	0–1	1–2	0–2	3–0	3–1	1–1	3–1	3–0	0–0	1–1	1–1
Chasetown	0–1	5–0	3–1	5–1	3–0		1–1	2–1	3–4	4–0	4–0	1–0	1–3	0–0	3–1	1–1	5–4	2–0	4–3	2–0	0–2	3–1
Cleethorpes Town	1–0	2–3	3–1	4–4	2–2	1–1		1–4	0–1	4–1	2–1	1–1	1–3	3–1	2–0	5–1	1–2	6–0	0–4	2–1	1–0	1–1
Corby Town	3–1	1–4	0–1	5–0	2–1	2–1	1–1		1–2	0–2	3–1	2–1	2–3	2–0	4–4	0–1	2–2	5–1	1–1	3–1	1–1	2–1
Frickley Athletic	1–2	2–2	2–4	5–1	4–0	5–0	1–2	3–0		3–0	4–4	3–2	5–3	1–0	8–0	2–0	4–2	3–3	1–0	1–0	2–0	2–1
Gresley	1–1	1–0	1–2	1–2	3–2	0–4	2–2	1–4	1–6		0–3	1–3	3–4	2–0	2–1	1–1	1–0	2–2	0–1	1–8	1–2	3–3
Kidsgrove Athletic	1–2	0–2	1–2	0–3	3–3	1–1	0–1	1–2	3–2	2–2		1–1	2–2	3–2	4–0	2–3	2–5	1–1	2–2	0–1	0–1	2–1
Leek Town	3–3	0–1	3–0	0–0	4–3	1–2	0–0	6–1	2–2	0–1	0–1		3–1	1–0	2–1	4–2	0–3	3–1	3–0	0–0	1–0	2–0
Lincoln United	0–1	1–0	1–3	8–1	1–1	3–1	4–5	5–2	2–1	2–0	2–1	0–9		5–2	0–1	3–1	0–0	2–1	4–1	1–0	0–1	1–5
Loughborough Dynamo	0–3	1–3	3–2	1–3	0–3	1–2	0–2	4–3	2–2	2–2	3–3	0–3	0–2		3–1	0–0	2–1	4–1	1–1	2–0	3–1	1–2
Market Drayton Town	0–3	0–5	1–5	1–1	1–3	1–3	3–2	1–2	0–6	5–0	4–3	3–2	1–3	2–2		5–2	1–2	0–2	1–1	1–0	0–0	0–2
Newcastle Town	1–1	1–2	2–3	2–0	1–0	0–3	1–0	2–4	0–1	2–1	0–2	1–2	1–2	1–2	0–0		0–3	3–0	2–0	6–1	0–1	2–2
Peterborough Sports	1–3	1–2	2–0	4–0	1–4	2–3	1–4	2–0	3–2	1–1	3–0	1–2	2–3	1–2	0–1	1–0		5–1	3–1	0–2	2–0	1–9
Romulus	2–6	0–5	1–2	1–2	2–2	2–1	2–3	0–1	1–2	1–0	2–4	0–0	3–0	4–0	0–0	3–1	1–1		2–2	1–2	3–1	3–2
Sheffield	2–2	1–2	1–1	0–1	2–1	1–1	1–1	2–3	3–4	0–2	3–2	0–4	3–2	2–2	4–4	4–3	3–2	2–2		5–1	0–0	2–2
Spalding United	0–1	1–3	2–1	1–1	1–2	2–0	0–3	2–1	1–3	1–2	1–3	1–3	2–1	1–3	0–0	2–0	2–0	1–1	3–0		0–0	1–1
Stamford	0–0	3–1	1–1	3–0	1–0	6–0	1–0	2–0	2–4	6–0	4–1	1–0	3–0	1–1	4–0	1–1	1–1	3–0	2–2	1–1		1–1
Stocksbridge Park Steels	2–2	0–0	4–2	1–1	2–1	4–0	1–1	2–3	1–1	1–1	3–2	4–3	1–1	4–3	0–1	0–2	1–2	2–1	1–2	0–2	1–0	

Updated to match(es) played on 28 April 2018. Source: NPL First Division South results grid
Legend: Blue = home team win; Yellow = draw; Red = away team win.

=== Play-offs ===
Semi-finals
3	Frickley Athletic	1
6	Stamford	2
4	Bedworth United	2
5	Chasetown	1

Final
4	Bedworth United	2
6	Stamford	1

Semi-finals

1 May 2018	Frickley Athletic	1–2	Stamford	Westfield Lane, South Elmsall
19:45		Report		Attendance: 536

1 May 2018	Bedworth United	2–1	Chasetown	The Oval, Bedworth
19:45		Report		Attendance: 517

Final

5 May 2018	Bedworth United	2–1 (a.e.t.)	Stamford	The Oval, Bedworth
15:00 (UTC+01:00)		Report		Attendance: 598

=== Stadia and locations ===
Locations of Northern Premier League 2017–18 Division One South teams

Team	Stadium	Capacity
Alvechurch	Lye Meadow	3,000
Basford United	Greenwich Avenue	1,000
Bedworth United	The Oval Ground	3,000
Belper Town	Christchurch Meadow	2,400
Carlton Town	Bill Stokeld Stadium	1,500
Chasetown	The Scholars Ground	2,000
Cleethorpes Town	Bradley Football Centre	3,000
Corby Town	Steel Park	3,893
Gresley	The Moat Ground	2,400
Frickley Athletic	Westfield Lane	2,087
Kidsgrove Athletic	The Seddon Stadium	2,000
Leek Town	Harrison Park	3,600
Lincoln United	Ashby Avenue	2,200
Loughborough Dynamo	Nanpantan Sports Ground	1,500
Market Drayton Town	Greenfields Sports Ground	1,000
Newcastle Town	Lyme Valley Stadium	4,000
Peterborough Sports	Lincoln Road	Unknown
Romulus	The Central Ground (groundshare with Sutton Coldfield Town)	2,000
Sheffield	Coach and Horses Ground	2,000
Spalding United	Sir Halley Stewart Field	3,500
Stamford	Borderville Sports Centre	2,000
Stocksbridge Park Steels	Bracken Moor	3,500

== Challenge Cup ==
2017–18 Northern Premier League Challenge Cup
The Integro League Cup

Tournament details
- Country: England; Wales
- Teams: 68

Final positions
- Champions: Atherton Collieries
- Runners-up: Coalville Town

Tournament statistics
- Matches played: 64

The 2017–18 Northern Premier League Challenge Cup, known as the 17–18 Integro Doodson League Cup for sponsorship reasons, was the 48th season of the Northern Premier League Challenge Cup, the main cup competition in the Northern Premier League. It was sponsored by Doodson Sport for a seventh consecutive season. 67 clubs from England and one from Wales entered the competition, beginning with the preliminary round, and all ties ended after 90 minutes and concluded with penalties.

The defending champions were Bamber Bridge, who defeated Grantham Town in the 2017 final and who lost to the eventual champions Atherton Collieries in the second round.

=== Calendar ===
Round	Clubs remaining	Clubs involved	Winners from previous round	New entries this round	Scheduled playing date
Preliminary round	68	8	0	8	5 to 6 September 2017
First round	64	64	4	60	15 to 18 October 2017
Second round	32	32	32	none	28 to 29 November 2017
Third round	16	16	16	none	29 to 30 January 2018
Quarter-finals	8	8	8	none	22 to 29 March 2018
Semi-finals	4	4	4	none	12 April 2018
Final	2	2	2	none	2 May 2018

=== Preliminary round ===
Tuesday 5 September 2017	Chasetown	0–3	Market Drayton Town	The Scholars Ground
19:45			Craig Ryan 2'; Joe Cuff 77'; Andre James 85'	Attendance: 141

Tuesday 5 September 2017	Colne	2–0	Clitheroe	Holt House
19:45	Daniel Wilkins 68'; Mark Ayres 89' (pen.)			Attendance: 130

Tuesday 5 September 2017	Scarborough Athletic	5–0	Sheffield FC	Flamingo Land Stadium
19:45	Daniel Stimpson 16'; 44' Emile Sinclair 55', 7', 88' (pen.); Billy Logan 76'			Attendance: 504

Wednesday 6 September 2017	Lincoln United	4–4 (6–5 p)	Corby Town	Ashby Avenue
19:45	Daniel Brooks 7', 45' (pen.); Sean Cann 40'; Matthew Cotton 90'		Steven Leslie 31', 42', 72' (pen.); Jordan Crawford 53'	Attendance: 104

=== First round ===
Monday 16 October 2017	Belper Town	5–5 (4–5 p)	Basford United	Christchurch Meadow
19:45	Kyle Clarke 24'; Leandro Browns 38'; Haydn Goddard 54' (pen.); Samuel Birks 63'; Joshua Barr-Rostron 74'		Harry Wakefield 5'; Aidan Austin 13'; Joe Harrison 52'; Robert Duffy 72', 76' (pen.)	Attendance: 95

Tuesday 17 October 2017	Altrincham	3–3 (4–3 p)	Ashton United	Moss Lane
19:45	Max Harrop 2'; Thomas Peers 24'; Mason Walsh 79'		Matthew Chadwick 3'; Liam Tomsett 44'; Thomas Eckersley 76'	Attendance: 246

Tuesday 17 October 2017	Bedworth United	2–0	Barwell	The Oval
19:45	Yusupha Ceesay 21'; Janabi Amour 90'			Attendance: 110

Tuesday 17 October 2017	Colne	1–2	Workington	Holt House
19:45	Adam Morning 68'		Robert Wilson 36'; Samuel Joel 61'	Attendance: 89

Tuesday 17 October 2017	Colwyn Bay	2–3	Warrington Town	Llanelian Road
19:45	Jack Kelleher 4'; Jamie Rainford 90'		Aboubacar Sanogo 47' (pen.), 64'; Connor Hughes 59'	Attendance: 133

Tuesday 17 October 2017	Frickley Athletic	3–3 (6–7 p)	Stocksbridge Park Steels	Westfield Lane
19:45	Marcus Birkelund 8'; Daniel Palmer 58'; Teddy Bloor 59'		Brodie Litchfield 33', 41', 81'	Attendance: 120

Tuesday 17 October 2017	Glossop North End	1–1 (3–4 p)	Mossley	Arthur Goldthorpe Stadium
19:45	Gary Gee 62' (pen.)		Jack Tuohy 21'	Attendance: 190

Tuesday 17 October 2017	Grantham Town	3–2	Lincoln United	South Kesteven Sports Stadium
19:45	Curtis Burrows 22'; Jordan Hempenstall 32', 58'		Jack McGovern 17'; Andrew Toyne 71'	Attendance: 159

Tuesday 17 October 2017	Halesowen Town	1–1 (3–4 p)	Romulus	The Grove
19:45	John McAtee 30'		Harry Harris 64'	Attendance: 131

Tuesday 17 October 2017	Hednesford Town	2–0	Rushall Olympic	Keys Park
19:45	Jordan Graham 19', 72'			Attendance: 233

Tuesday 17 October 2017	Hyde United	0–0 (4–5 p)	Trafford	Ewen Fields
19:45				Attendance: 167

Tuesday 17 October 2017	Kendal Town	0–2	Lancaster City	Parkside Road
19:45			Craig Carney 23'; Paul Dugdale 47'	Attendance: 168

Tuesday 17 October 2017	Marine	4–1	Brighouse Town	Crosby, Merseyside
19:45	Danny Mitchley 13', 27' (pen.); Michael Brewster 59'; Liam Tongue 60'		Daniel Grimshaw 25' (pen.)	Stadium: Rossett Park; Attendance: 169

Tuesday 17 October 2017	Mickleover Sports	3–1	Loughborough Dynamo	Station Road
19:45	Andrew Dales 48'; Pablo Mills 55'; Tevahn Tyrell 66'		Daniel Quinn 64'	Attendance: 101

Tuesday 17 October 2017	Newcastle Town	3–1	Market Drayton Town	Lyme Valley Stadium
19:45	Matthew Thomas 42', 50'; Jordan Cole 45'		George Bowerman 25'	Attendance: 78

Tuesday 17 October 2017	Prescot Cables	1–4	Bamber Bridge	Valerie Park
19:45	Joshua Klein-Davies 52'		Jamie Milligan 32' (pen.); Adam Dodd 33'; Brad Carsley 70'; James Boyd 88'	Attendance: 165

Tuesday 17 October 2017	Shaw Lane	3–5	Cleethorpes Town	Sheerien Park
19:45	Chib Chilaka 15'; Niah Payne 44'; Lee Bennett 70'		Daniel North 15', 75'; Alex Flett 48', 61'; Jack Richardson 73'	Attendance: 100

Tuesday 17 October 2017	Skelmersdale United	0–3	Atherton Collieries	West Lancashire College Stadium
19:45			Iain Howard 35', 43'; Kristian Holt 80'	Attendance: 101

Tuesday 17 October 2017	South Shields	2–2 (5–3 p)	Farsley Celtic	Mariners Park
19:45	Michael Richardson 53'; Jon Shaw 55'		James Pollard 89'; Luke Parkin 90' (pen.)	Attendance: 1056

Tuesday 17 October 2017	Spalding United	1–1 (4–3 p)	Gresley FC	Sir Halley Stewart Field
19:45	Lewis Millington 27'		Ryan Robbins 90'	Attendance: 109

Tuesday 17 October 2017	Stamford	1–0	Peterborough Sports	Borderville
19:45	Pearson Mwanyongo 85'			Attendance: 216

Tuesday 17 October 2017	Sutton Coldfield Town	1–1 (5–6 p)	Stafford Rangers	Central Ground
19:45	Jak Barnes 53'		Jack Langston 77'	Attendance: 77

Tuesday 17 October 2017	Whitby Town	1–2	Scarborough Athletic	Turnbull Ground
19:45	Niall McGoldrick 21'		Charlie Binns 68'; Nathan Valentine 87'	Attendance: 643

Tuesday 17 October 2017	Witton Albion	3–0	Radcliffe Borough	Wincham Park
19:45	Nicholas Ryan 18'; Paul Williams 56'; Thomas Owens 84'			Attendance: 114

Wednesday 18 October 2017	Carlton Town	1–1 (1–4 p)	Matlock Town	Stokeld Stadium
19:45	Jordan Wilson 23'		Adam Yates 59'	Attendance: 125

Wednesday 18 October 2017	Kidsgrove Athletic	2–1	Leek Town	Hollinwood Road
19:45	Arron Johns 52'; Anthony Malbon 90'		Niall Maguire 29'	Attendance: 169

Saturday 28 October 2017	Tadcaster Albion	2–1	Ossett Albion	Ings Lane
15:00	Joshua Greening 14'; Conor Sellars 73'		Tommy Wood 71'	Attendance: 175

Monday 6 November 2017	Stourbridge	2–4	Alvechurch	War Memorial Athletic Ground
19:45	Luke Benbow 56', 63' (pen.)		Thomas Turton 2' (pen.); Andrew Parsons 16'; Nathaniel Waite 23'; Mitch Botfield 33'	Attendance: 431

Tuesday 7 November 2017	Ramsbottom United	3–0	Stalybridge Celtic	Harry Williams Riverside Stadium
19:45	Edward Moran 7'; Benjamin Richardson 37'; Jerome Wright 70'			Attendance: 182

Tuesday 14 November 2017	Buxton	3–5	Coalville Town	The Silverlands
19:45	Sam Smith 9' (pen.); Andrew Ramwell 15', 79'		Blair Anderson 10'; Stephen Towers 12'; Nathan Watson 49', 59'; Arron Jameson 50' (o.g.)	Attendance: 87

Tuesday 14 November 2017	Nantwich Town	3–1	Droylsden	Weaver Stadium
19:45	David Forbes 27' (pen.); Stephen Jones 36'; Joe Mwasile 76'		Liam Caddick 76'	Attendance: 135

Tuesday 14 November 2017	Ossett Town	2–0	Goole AFC	Ingfield
19:45	Emile Sinclair 54'; Danny South 73'			Attendance: 96

=== Second round ===
Tuesday 28 November 2017	Gresley	2–4	Basford United	Moat Ground
19:45	Daniel Quinn 9'; Louis Danquah 33'		Gideon Boateng 43'; Kieran Wells 60'; Harry Wakefield 65'; Anthony Graham 76'	Attendance: 79

Tuesday 28 November 2017	Hednesford Town	1–0	Newcastle Town	Keys Park
19:45	Jordan Graham 81'			Attendance: 192

Tuesday 28 November 2017	Matlock Town	3–2	Grantham Town	Causeway Lane
19:45	Michael Williams 18' (pen.); Adam Yates 65'; Dwayne Wiley 82'		Jordan Hempenstall 26'; Jack McMenemy 53'	Attendance: 132

Tuesday 28 November 2017	Mickleover Sports	3–0	Bedworth United	Station Road
19:45	Bradley Grayson 26'; Oliver Mulders 54'; Lewis Belgrave 84'			Attendance: 71

Tuesday 28 November 2017	Mossley	3–3 (5–4 p)	Altrincham	Seel Park
19:45	Liam Ellis 10'; Adam Latham 36', 90'		Joshua Hancock 12', 15', 84'	Attendance: 109

Tuesday 28 November 2017	Nantwich Town	2–3	Witton Albion	Weaver Stadium
19:45	Jamie Morgan 27'; Stephen Jones 39'		Micah Evans 21'; Steven Tames 73', 85'	Attendance: 138

Tuesday 28 November 2017	Ramsbottom United	0–0 (4–3 p)	Hyde United	Harry Williams Riverside Stadium
19:45				Attendance: 156

Tuesday 28 November 2017	Romulus	0–1	Kidsgrove Athletic	The Central Ground
19:45			Joshua Graham 90'	Attendance: 26

Tuesday 28 November 2017	Scarborough Athletic	2–1	Ossett Town	Flamingo Land Stadium
19:45	Sam Hewitt 38'; James Beadle 73'		Emile Sinclair 44'	Attendance: 441

Tuesday 28 November 2017	South Shields	2–1	Stocksbridge Park Steels	Mariners Park
19:45	Michael Richardson 54'; Luke Sullivan 89' (pen.)		Oliver Warren 90'	Attendance: 605

Tuesday 28 November 2017	Stafford Rangers	1–1 (4–2 p)	Alvechurch	Marston Road
19:45	Levi Reid 10'		Jamie Willets 62'	Attendance: 163

Tuesday 5 December 2017	Coalville Town	5–1	Stamford	Owen Street Sports Ground
19:45	Alex Howes 40'; Daniel Creaney 61', 74' (pen.), 80'; Kyle Dixon 86'		Bradley Fortnam-Tomlinson 38'	Attendance: 69

Wednesday 17 January 2018	Cleethorpes Town	3-2	Tadcaster Albion	Bradley Football Development Centre
19.45	Brody Robertson 78'; Oliver Donald 86'; Daniel North 90'		Joseph Pugh 35'; Jack Reynolds 42'	Attendance: 106

Tuesday 20 February 2018	Warrington Town	0–2	Lancaster City	Cantilever Park
19.45			Ryan Winder 67' (pen.); Richard Mercer 75'	Attendance: 108

Tuesday 20 February 2018	Workington	2–1	Marine	Borough Park
	Nathan Waterson 10', 80'		Dominic Reid 73'	Attendance: 163

Monday 5 March 2018	Atherton Colleries	2–2 (4–2 p)	Bamber Bridge	Alder House
19:45	Iain Howard 69'; Marcus Cusani 90'		Alistair Waddecar 45'; Jamie Milligan 90'	Attendance: 143

=== Third round ===
Monday 29 January 2018	Basford United	3–0	Kidsgrove Athletic	Greenwich Avenue
19:45	James Reid 28' (pen.); Kieren Fenton 74'; Liam Hearn 77'			Attendance: 114

Tuesday 30 January 2018	Matlock Town	1–3	Hednesford Town	Causeway Lane
19:45	Shaun Harrad 23'		Reece King; Danny Glover; Jan Yeomans (o.g.)	Attendance: 223

Tuesday 30 January 2018	Mossley	0–3	Ramsbottom United	Seel Park
19:45			Edward Moran 25'; Chris Rushworth 84'; Jerome Wright 88'	Attendance: 100

Tuesday 20 February 2018	Mickleover Sports	3–3 (4–3 p)	Witton Albion	Station Road
19:45	Pablo Mills 54', 86'; Louis Briscoe 81'		James Foley 35'; Steven Tames 79', 84'	Attendance: 119

Tuesday 6 March 2018	Lancaster City	0–0 (4–5 p)	Workington	Giant Axe
19:45				Attendance: 114

Tuesday 6 March 2018	Stafford Rangers	2–3	Coalville Town	Marston Road
19:45	Robert Thompson-Brown 12'; Kyle Perry 37'		Thomas McGlinchey 41'; Daniel Creaney 52'; Jake Woolley 89'	Attendance: 145

Thursday 15 March 2018	Cleethorpes Town	0–2	South Shields	Bradley Football Development Centre
19:45			Carl Finnigan 13'; Daniel Lowther 60'	Attendance: 152

Thursday 22 March 2018	Atherton Colleries	2–0	Scarborough Athletic	Alder House
19:45	Glenn Matthews 37'; David Sherlock 59'			Attendance: 141

=== Quarter-finals ===
Thursday 22 March 2018	Coalville Town	3–0	Mickleover Sports	Owen Street Sports Ground
19:45	Kyle Dixon 24'; Daniel Creaney 68'; Nathan Watson 71'			Attendance: 52

Tuesday 27 March 2018	Hednesford Town	5–0	Basford United	Keys Park
19:45	Danny Glover 3', 22'; Jordan Graham 42'; Kieran Fenton 46' (o.g.); Charlie Gatter 85'			Attendance: 188

Thursday 29 March 2018	Workington	1–5	South Shields	Borough Park
19:45	Max Brown 24'		Lee Mason 16'; Barrie Smith 56' (pen.); Luke Sullivan 58'; Graeme Armstrong 77'; Daniel Lowther 80'	Attendance: 229

Thursday 29 March 2018	Atherton Collieries	2–0	Ramsbottom United	Alder House
19:45	Adam Farrell 13'; Ben Hardcastle 87'			Attendance: 162

=== Semi-finals ===
Thursday 12 April 2018	Hednesford Town	1–4	Atherton Collieries	Keys Park
19:45	Danny Glover 72' (pen.)		Jordan Cover 49', 70'; Bradley Cooke 53'; Ben Hardcastle 90'	Attendance: 211

Thursday 12 April 2018	South Shields	2–3	Coalville Town	Mariners Park
19:45	Michael Richardson 19', 74'		Daniel Creaney 2'; Nathan Watson 49', 66'	Attendance: 908

=== Final ===
Wednesday 2 May 2018	Coalville Town	1–2	Atherton Collieries	Alfreton
19:45	Nathan Watson 74'		Joshua Messer 8'; Jordan Cover 65'	Stadium: North Street; Attendance: 374

== Level 6 & 7 Summary ==
=== Level 6 Summary 2017-18 ===
League	Champion	Promoted via Play-off	Defeated in Play-off	Relegated
Southern Premier Division	Hereford	Slough Town	Weymouth Kettering Town	Dunstable Town
Northern Premier Division	Altrincham	Ashton United	Warrington Town Grantham Town Farsley Celtic	Sutton Coldfield Town
Isthmian Premier Division	Billericay Town	Dulwich Hamlet	Folkestone Invicta Leiston	Thurrock Tooting & Mitcham United.

=== Level 7 Summary 2017-18 ===
League	Champion	Promoted	Promoted via Play-off	Defeated in Play-off	Relegated
Southern Division One East	Beaconsfield Town F.C.	AFC Rushden & Diamonds	Hartley Wintney F.C.	AFC Dunstable Hayes & Yeading United F.C.	Arlesey Town F.C.
Southern Division One West	Taunton Town F.C.	Salisbury City F.C.	Swindon Supermarine F.C.	Evesham United F.C. Didcot Town F.C.	Shortwood United F.C. Bishop's Cleeve F.C.
Northern Division One North	South Shields F.C.	Scarborough Athletic F.C. Hyde United F.C.	Bamber Bridge F.C.	Prescot Cables F.C. Trafford F.C. Tadcaster Albion A.F.C.	Goole A.F.C.
Northern Division One South	Basford United F.C.	Alvechurch F.C.	Bedworth United F.C.	Stamford A.F.C. Chasetown F.C. Frickley Athletic F.C.	Romulus F.C.
Isthmian Division One North	A.F.C. Hornchurch	Potters Bar Town F.C.	Haringey Borough F.C.	Bowers & Pitsea F.C. Heybridge Swifts F.C.	Norwich United F.C.
Isthmian Division One South	Carshalton Athletic F.C.	Lewes F.C.	Walton Casuals F.C. Corinthian-Casuals F.C.	Greenwich Borough F.C. Cray Wanderers F.C.	Shoreham F.C.

Note: Corinthian-Casuals were promoted as the Level 8 play-off final loser with the highest PPG, after Thurrock's resignation from the Isthmian Premier Division.

== See also ==
- Northern Premier League
- 2017–18 Isthmian League
- 2017–18 Southern League
