= Pedro Richards =

English footballer

Personal information
- Full name: Peter Richards
- Date of birth: 11 November 1956
- Place of birth: Edmonton, London, England
- Date of death: 23 December 2001 (aged 45)
- Place of death: Nottingham, England
- Height: 5 ft 8 in (1.73 m)
- Position: Defender

Senior career*
Years	Team	Apps	(Gls)
1974–1986	Notts County	399	(5)
1986–1987	Boston United	17	(0)
1991–1992	Arnold Town	10	(0)
- Oakham United
- Corby Town
Total		426	(5)
- * Club domestic league appearances and goals

Peter "Pedro" Richards (11 November 1956 – 23 December 2001) was an English footballer who played in defence for Notts County.

The son of a Black British father and a Spanish mother, Richards was taken by his mother at an early age to Laguardia, Álava and lived there until the age of 11 when they moved to Nottingham. Richards was taken on as an apprentice at County and signed professional for them in November 1974. He made 399 league appearances for County, his sole Football League club. He was a home crowd favorite particularly because of his sure tackling and consistency.

Richards left County at the age of 29 and continued playing semi-professional football for Boston United, Oakham United, Corby Town and Arnold Town. He died in 2001 from a rare strain of pneumonia.

== Personal life ==
His son Jordan is also a footballer.
