= Alex Howes (footballer) =

English footballer

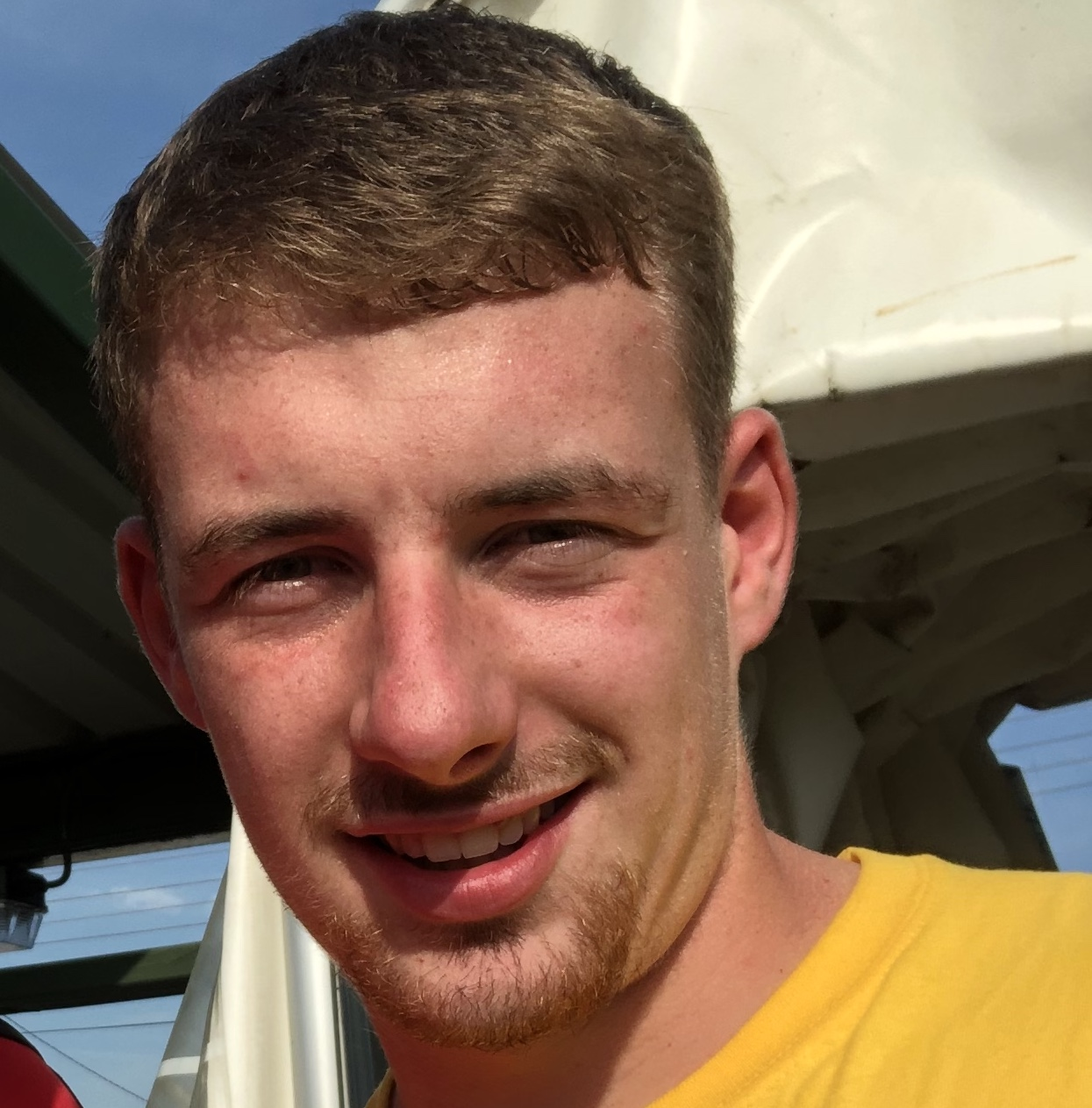
- Howes in August 2019

Personal information
- Full name: Alex Jacob Howes
- Date of birth: 6 January 2000 (age 26)
- Place of birth: Nottingham, England
- Position: Midfielder

Team information
- Current team: Basford United

Youth career
- –2017: Notts County

Senior career*
Years	Team	Apps	(Gls)
2017–2020	Notts County	5	(0)
2017–2018	→ Coalville Town (loan)	26	(9)
2019	→ Tamworth (loan)	4	(0)
2020–	Basford United	23	(2)
- * Club domestic league appearances and goals as of 23:43, 29 April 2022 (UTC)

Alex Jacob Howes (born 6 January 2000) is an English footballer who plays for Basford United, where he plays as a midfielder. Howes started his young career at Notts County at age 9, working his way through the youth set up, until he was released at the age of 20, after making 5 senior appearances for the club.

== Playing career ==
=== Notts County ===
Howes was first called up to the Notts County senior squad in March 2017, being selected for the bench against Hartlepool United by player-manager Kevin Nolan. He made his professional debut in a 3–1 victory over Colchester United on 1 April 2017, coming on as a substitute for Jon Stead. He made his first start for Notts County on 6 May 2017, the final day of the 2016-17 season, in a 2–1 away loss at Newport County, where he played 58 minutes before being replaced by Alan Smith.

=== Coalville Town (loan) ===
In November, 2017, Howes was loaned to Northern Premier League side Coalville Town. He scored his first goal for the club against Stamford in a 5–1 cup victory. Howes made a total of 26 appearances, scoring 9 goals in a successful loan spell with the club.

=== Tamworth (loan) ===
Howes joined Southern League Premier Division Central side Tamworth on a one-month loan deal on 16 August 2019. He made his debut for the following day, in a home Southern League Premier Division Central match against Peterborough Sports, coming on as a 69th-minute substitute for James Fry. He went onto make 3 more appearances for the club in a month loan spell.

=== Basford United ===
On 9 August 2020 Howe joined Northern Premier League side Basford United following his release from Notts County.

== Career statistics ==
As of match played 4 September 2019.

Appearances and goals by club, season and competition
Club	Season	League			FA Cup		League Cup		Under 23s		Total	
Club	Season	Division	Apps	Goals	Apps	Goals	Apps	Goals	Apps	Goals	Apps	Goals
Notts County	2016–17	League Two	5	0	0	0	0	0	36	12	41	12
Coalville Town (loan)	2017–18	Northern Premier League	26	9	0	0	0 (Note: Appearances in The Integro League Cup.)	0	0 (Note: Appearances in the Leicestershire Challenge Cup.)	0	26	9
Tamworth (loan)	2019–20	Southern League Premier Central	4	0	0	0	—		0	0	4	0
Career total			35	9	0	0	0	0	36	12	71	12
