= Wes Atkinson =

English footballer

Personal information
- Full name: Wesley Atkinson
- Date of birth: 13 October 1994 (age 32)
- Place of birth: West Bromwich, England
- Height: 6 ft 0 in (1.83 m)
- Position: Right back

Youth career
- West Bromwich Albion

Senior career*
Years	Team	Apps	(Gls)
2011–2015	West Bromwich Albion	0	(0)
2014–2015	→ Cambridge United (loan)	2	(0)
2015–2017	Notts County	19	(0)
2015	→ Eastleigh (loan)	2	(0)
2016	→ Gateshead (loan)	7	(0)
2017	→ Alfreton Town (loan)	12	(1)
2017	Rushall Olympic	12	(1)
2017	Solihull Moors	3	(1)
2018	Boston United	6	(0)
2018	Rushall Olympic	6	(0)
2018	Gloucester City	1	(0)
2020–2022	Hednesford Town	26	(1)
- * Club domestic league appearances and goals as of 19:48, 13 July 2021 (UTC) 2024/2025 West Midlands Fire Service FC. English Fire Service Cup Winners 2025.

Wesley Atkinson (born 13 October 1994) is an English former professional footballer who played as a right back.

== Career ==
=== West Bromwich Albion ===
Atkinson was born in West Bromwich on 13 October 1994 and played for West Bromwich Albion's youth team. On 7 June 2013, West Bromwich Albion F.C. (WBA) gave him a third-year scholarship deal; a year later, he signed his first professional deal with the team and played with them until 2015. That November, he was loaned to Cambridge United until January 2015 despite being featured regularly in the club's under-21 side. On 13 December, Atkinson made his professional debut, replacing Tom Naylor in the 77th minute of a 0–0 home draw against Shrewsbury Town for the League Two championship.

At the end of the 2014–15 season, the club released Atkinson.

=== Notts County ===
Shortly after leaving WBA, Atkinson signed a one-year contract with Notts County. He was loaned briefly to Eastleigh F.C. in 2015. His contract with Notts County extended in June 2016 and he was loaned to Gateshead from November 2016 to January 2017. In March 2017, he was loaned to Alfreton Town F.C., where he finished out the season.

=== Rushall ===
Following a summer of training, Atkinson signed with Rushall Olympic F.C. in September 2017. He played with them for only two months before signing with Moors. Within a month, he signed with Boston and played for them from January to May 2018 before returning to Rushall in August. Two months later, he was approached by former Eastleigh manager Chris Todd and subsequently signed with Gloucester City A.F.C.

=== Gloucester ===
Atkinson played only one game with Gloucester; while competing in the Gloucestershire Senior Cup against Cirencester, he suffered an Anterior Cruciate Ligament injury that required surgery and prevented him from finishing out the 2018-2019 season or participating at all in 2019-2020.

=== Hednesford ===
He trialled for Hednesford Town F.C. during the summer of 2020 and was offered a non-contract deal for the 2020-2021 season. During a pre-season game, however, he Tore his Achilles Tendon and could not play for the rest of the season. During the summer of 2021, Hednesford reiterated their interest in him and Atkinson is currently expected to be in their 2021-2022 lineup.

== Career statistics ==
As of 13 July 2021

Club	Season	League			FA Cup		League Cup		Other		Total	
Club	Season	Division	Apps	Goals	Apps	Goals	Apps	Goals	Apps	Goals	Apps	Goals
Cambridge Utd. (loan)	2014–15	League Two	2	0	0	0	0	0	0	0	2	0
Eastleigh (loan)	2015–16	National League	3	0	0	0	0	0	0	0	2	0
Gateshead (loan)	2016–17	National League	7	0	0	0	0	0	0	0	7	0
Alfreton (loan)	2016–17	National League North	8	1	0	0	0	0	0	0	8	1
Notts County	2015–16	League Two	19	0	0	0	0	0	1	0	20	0
Notts County	2016–17	League Two	0	0	0	0	1	0	1	0	2	0
Solihull Moors	2017–18	National League North	3	1	0	0	0	0	0	0	3	1
Boston United	2017–18	National League North	2	0	0	0	0	0	0	0	2	0
Gloucester City	2018–19	National League North	1	0	0	0	0	0	0	0	1	0
Total			45	2	0	0	0	0	0	0	47	0
Career total			45	2	0	0	1	0	2	0	47	2
